= Alec Stockton =

Filipino basketball player (born 1998)

No. 12 – Converge FiberXers
- Position: Shooting guard
- League: PBA

Personal information
- Born: June 24, 1998 (age 28) Los Angeles, California, U.S.
- Listed height: 6 ft 1 in (1.85 m)
- Listed weight: 170 lb (77 kg)

Career information
- High school: Pacific High School
- College: Far Eastern University (2017–2019)
- PBA draft: 2020: 2nd round, 21st overall pick
- Drafted by: Alaska Aces
- Playing career: 2022–present

Career history
- 2021–2022: Alaska Aces
- 2022–present: Converge FiberXers

Career highlights
- PBA All-Star (2026)

Alec June Delma Stockton (born June 24, 1998) is a Filipino-American professional basketball player for the Converge FiberXers of the Philippine Basketball Association (PBA). He played college basketball for the FEU Tamaraws. He was selected 21st overall by the Alaska Aces in the 2020 PBA draft.

== Early life and high school career ==
Stockton was born in Los Angeles but grew up in splitting time in the Philippines with his grandmother and older brother, and in New York City with his mother, Mariles, and his sister, Marie. He also lived in Paris with his father and younger brother.

In his senior season, Stockton led all New York public school players in assists with slightly over 10 per game. He was offered scholarships by Philippine universities San Beda and FEU. He committed to FEU, choosing them for their history developing guards. It was his sister that convinced their mother to let him play in the Philippines.

== College career ==
With the FEU Tamaraws, Stockton developed from a playmaker into a defender. In his rookie season, Season 80, they made it to the Final Four, where they won Game 1 and nearly pulled off an upset win over the Ateneo Blue Eagles in Game 2. In his sophomore season, they faced Ateneo again in the playoffs. During their matchup, he almost landed a punch on Thirdy Ravena, which led to his ejection from the game.

For Season 82, Stockton averaged five points, two assists and 1.7 rebounds in 16 minutes as they reached the first round of the Final Four. He then skipped his final two years of eligibility to apply for the PBA draft.

== Professional career ==
=== Alaska Aces (2021–2022) ===
Stockton was selected 21st overall by the Alaska Aces in the 2020 PBA draft. In his rookie season, he didn't make the Aces' lineup for the 2021 Philippine Cup, as they had multiple guards and teams were also limited to only five Fil-foreigners on each roster. He was able to play in the Governors' Cup.

=== Converge FiberXers (2022–present) ===
==== 2022–23 ====
Stockton was one of the holdovers from the sale of the Aces to Converge ICT as he signed a two-year deal, making him part of the new Converge FiberXers. During the 2022–23 Commissioner's Cup, he broke out with 15 points with eight rebounds off the bench in a win over the Blackwater Bossing. During the 2023 Governors' Cup, he had 18 points in a win over the Magnolia Chicken Timplados Hotshots. He then had 14 points, five rebounds, and four assists in a win over the San Miguel Beermen. That conference, they lost in the first round of the playoffs to the Beermen. Also during that season, he was named as an injury-replacement for Isaac Go for the Rookies-Sophomores-Juniors game during All-Star Weekend.

==== 2023–24 ====
During the offseason, Stockton was fined ₱50,000 for participating in a "ligang labas" game without permission. For the 2023–24 season, he was voted into the Rookies-Sophomores-Juniors game for that season's All-Star Weekend. On March 16, 2024, Stockton signed a maximum three-year deal with the team. However, from the 2023–24 Commissioner's Cup to the 2024 Philippine Cup, the team lost 12 straight games. This included a loss to the Beermen in which he had 31 points alongside Justin Arana's 32 points, becoming the first two locals in franchise history to score 30+ points in the same game. The following game, they broke their losing streak against the Meralco Bolts, in which he scored 20 points. He then had a season-high 32 points in a loss to Barangay Ginebra.

==== 2024–25 ====
Stockton began the 2024–25 season leading all locals in scoring in their season opener against the Terrafirma Dyip with 21 points (13 of which he scored in the third quarter). After going on a three-game losing streak, he scored 21 points to lead Converge to a win over the NorthPort Batang Pier. Against Meralco, he scored 12 of his 27 points in the fourth quarter, including seven of the team's last nine points, for Converge to win its third straight. Converge finished on a four-game winning streak to get into the playoffs. In their quarterfinals series against the Beermen, they started the series down 0–2. During Game 3, he was given a flagrant foul two for elbowing Kris Rosales in the face. This would have led to his ejection, but the referees reviewed the call and downgraded it to a flagrant foul one, allowing him to keep playing. He then went on to score 20 points, eight assists, and seven rebounds in 32 minutes and hit the game-winning buzzer-beater to extend the series. In Game 4, he contributed 16 points, five rebounds, and eight assists to force a do-or-die match. However, despite leading with 22 points and eight assists, the Beermen were able to win the series. For the 2024 Governors' Cup, he averaged 21.2 points, 4.8 rebounds, and 3.7 assists.

Converge continued its momentum during the 2024–25 Commissioner's Cup. Down by 20 against Magnolia, he and Arana led a comeback, with him making a game-tying three-pointer before he made the assist to Arana for the game-winning layup. He finished with a double-double of 18 markers and 10 assists to go with seven rebounds. He then followed it up with 14 points, eight rebounds, and five assists in their win versus the Phoenix Super LPG Fuel Masters. Against Barangay Ginebra, they found themselves down by 17 at halftime. He then scored 14 straight points in the third quarter to finish with 17 points and a three-point lead heading into the fourth. He finished the game with 22 points, eight assists, six rebounds, and the win. After a loss to the TNT Tropang Giga in which he only had nine points, he bounced back with 21 points (with 17 scored in the fourth quarter) in a win over the Rain or Shine Elasto Painters. He closed out the conference with a career-high 36 points in a loss to the Beermen. In the quarterfinals, they were a win away from making the semifinals, but Rain or Shine won the next two games to win the series 2–1. In the Philippine Cup, he scored a conference-high 34 points in a win over the Batang Pier.

==== 2025–26 ====
During the 2025–26 season, Converge added multiple guards to its roster by drafting Juan Gómez de Liaño, re-signing Schonny Winston, and later on signing Mikey Williams. With a backcourt of Gómez de Liaño, Winston, and Stockton, Converge had a 7–4 record during the Philippine Cup. However, his play was inconsistent, as despite averaging 14.9 points, 3.4 rebounds and 2.1 assists, he struggled in Converge's last three games of the elimination round. In the do-or-die Game 2 of the quarterfinals against Barangay Ginebra, Converge was leading by three in the final seconds of the game when Stockton fouled Jeremiah Gray as he was taking a three-pointer. Gray then made all of his three free throws to send the game into overtime. Barangay Ginebra won in overtime, once again denying Converge a trip to the semifinals.

That season, Stockton was selected to his first All-Star appearance. In the All-Star Game, he led the South team with 29 points.

== Personal life ==
Stockton is married with two sons.

== Career statistics ==
=== Season-by-season averages ===
Year	Team	GP	MPG	FG%	3P%	FT%	RPG	APG	SPG	BPG	PPG
2021	Alaska	17	7.4	.457	.429	1.000	.8	.5	.2	.1	2.3
2022–23	Converge	37	19.6	.459	.294	.650	2.7	2.2	.6	.2	6.5
2023–24	Converge	21	27.0	.496	.413	.802	3.8	2.8	.7	.3	15.7
Career		75	18.9	.477	.361	.745	2.6	2.0	.6	.2	8.1
