= 2023–24 Magnolia Chicken Timplados Hotshots season =

- Head coach: Chito Victolero
- General Manager: Alvin Patrimonio
- Owner(s): San Miguel Food and Beverage (a San Miguel Corporation subsidiary)

Commissioner's Cup results
- Record: 9–2 (81.8%)
- Place: 1st
- Playoff finish: Runner-up (lost to San Miguel, 2–4)

Philippine Cup results
- Record: 6–5 (54.5%)
- Place: 7th
- Playoff finish: Quarterfinalist (lost to Barangay Ginebra with twice-to-win disadvantage)

Magnolia Chicken Timplados Hotshots seasons

The 2023–24 Magnolia Chicken Timplados Hotshots season was the 35th season of the franchise in the Philippine Basketball Association (PBA).

== Key dates ==
- September 17: The PBA season 48 draft was held at the Market! Market! in Taguig.

== Draft picks ==
Round	Pick	Player	Position	Place of birth	College
3	33	Patrick Maagdenberg	C/F	New Zealand	Ateneo
4	44	Rey Anthony Peralta	G	Philippines	Perpetual
5	55	Warren Bonifacio	F	Philippines	Mapúa
6	63	Christian Buñag	C	Philippines	Mapúa

== Roster ==
2023–24 Magnolia Chicken Timplados Hotshots roster
Players
Coaches

Pos.	#	POB	Name	Height	Weight	DOB (YYYY–MM–DD)	From
F	1	(Philippines)	Jackson Corpuz	6 ft 4 in (1.93 m)	195 lb (88 kg)	1989–02–08	Philippine Christian
G	2	(United States)	Jerrick Ahanmisi	6 ft 1 in (1.85 m)	185 lb (84 kg)	1997–10–16	Adamson
G	3	(Philippines)	Paul Lee	6 ft 0 in (1.83 m)	200 lb (91 kg)	1989–02–14	UE
C	4	(United States)	Rafi Reavis (C)	6 ft 8 in (2.03 m)	210 lb (95 kg)	1977–07–26	Coppin State
F/C	5	(Philippines)	Abu Tratter	6 ft 5 in (1.96 m)	215 lb (98 kg)	1993–01–09	De La Salle
G	6	(Philippines)	Jio Jalalon	5 ft 9 in (1.75 m)	150 lb (68 kg)	1992–08–02	Arellano
F/C	10	(Philippines)	Ian Sangalang	6 ft 7 in (2.01 m)	212 lb (96 kg)	1991–12–20	San Sebastian
F	13	(Philippines)	Calvin Abueva	6 ft 3 in (1.91 m)	209 lb (95 kg)	1988–02–04	San Sebastian
G	14	(Philippines)	Mark Barroca	5 ft 10 in (1.78 m)	170 lb (77 kg)	1986–04–25	Far Eastern
F	19	(United States)	Rome dela Rosa	6 ft 3 in (1.91 m)	185 lb (84 kg)	1990–12–11	San Beda
F	23	(British Hong Kong)	Joseph Eriobu	6 ft 4 in (1.93 m)	198 lb (90 kg)	1992–02–12	Mapúa
C	42	(Australia)	James Laput	6 ft 10 in (2.08 m)	245 lb (111 kg)	1996–08–26	De La Salle
F	57	(Philippines)	Aris Dionisio	6 ft 4 in (1.93 m)		1995–07–21	St. Clare
G	65	(Philippines)	Jed Mendoza	5 ft 10 in (1.78 m)	160 lb (73 kg)	1996–06–21	UE
G	77	(Philippines)	Jerrick Balanza	6 ft 1 in (1.85 m)	190 lb (86 kg)	1996–09–06	Letran
F/C	88	(Philippines)	Russel Escoto	6 ft 6 in (1.98 m)	200 lb (91 kg)	1992–12–04	Far Eastern

Head coach

- (Philippines) Chito Victolero

Assistant coach(es)

- (Philippines) Jason Webb (1st assistant)
- (Philippines) Johnny Abarrientos
- (Philippines) Angelito Esguerra
- (Philippines) Antonio Espinosa
- (Philippines) Mon Jose
- (Philippines) Juno Sauler
- (Philippines) Paul Sorongon

Team manager

- (Philippines) Alvin Patrimonio

Legend

- (C) Team captain
- (CI) Commissioner's Cup Import
- (GI) Governors' Cup Import
- (EI) EASL Import
- (DP) Unsigned draft pick
- (FA) Free agent
- (IN) Inactive
- (S) Suspended
- (R) Rookie
- Injured

Roster

== Preseason ==
=== PBA on Tour ===
==== Game log ====
2023 PBA on Tour game log
Total: 11–0
May: 2–0

Game	Date	Opponent	Score	High points	High rebounds	High assists	Location Attendance	Record
1	May 28	Blackwater	W 117–83	Ahanmisi, Barroca, Tratter (14)	James Laput (12)	Mark Barroca (6)	Ynares Sports Arena	1–0
2	May 31	Converge	W 99–95	Paul Lee (21)	James Laput (10)	Mark Barroca (7)	Ynares Sports Arena	2–0

June: 4–0

Game	Date	Opponent	Score	High points	High rebounds	High assists	Location Attendance	Record
3	June 3	NLEX	W 103–97	Jackson Corpuz (19)	James Laput (13)	Barroca, Lee (5)	Baliwag Star Arena	3–0
4	June 11	Barangay Ginebra	W 91–80	Mark Barroca (20)	James Laput (12)	Mark Barroca (5)	Ynares Center	4–0
5	June 16	TNT	W 96–63	Rome dela Rosa (19)	James Laput (13)	Jio Jalalon (7)	Ynares Sports Arena	5–0
6	June 23	NorthPort	W 125–89	Jerrick Ahanmisi (23)	Jackson Corpuz (9)	Mark Barroca (8)	Ynares Sports Arena	6–0

July: 5–0

Game	Date	Opponent	Score	High points	High rebounds	High assists	Location Attendance	Record
7	July 2	Meralco	W 121–101	Paul Lee (28)	James Laput (10)	Barroca, Jalalon (6)	Filoil EcoOil Centre	7–0
8	July 9	San Miguel	W 94–65	James Laput (21)	Calvin Abueva (16)	Jalalon, Lee, Mendoza (5)	Ynares Sports Arena	8–0
9	July 15	Rain or Shine	W 103–88	Jio Jalalon (24)	Abu Tratter (14)	Mark Barroca (8)	Lamberto Macias Sports and Cultural Center	9–0
10	July 23	Phoenix Super LPG	W 111–91	Jio Jalalon (22)	Dionisio, Tratter (8)	Jio Jalalon (9)	Filoil EcoOil Centre	10–0
11	July 26	Terrafirma	W 106–92	James Laput (16)	James Laput (11)	Jio Jalalon (12)	Filoil EcoOil Centre	11–0

== Commissioner's Cup ==
=== Eliminations ===
==== Standings ====
Pos	Team	W	L	PCT	GB	Qualification
1	Magnolia Chicken Timplados Hotshots	9	2	.818	—	Twice-to-beat in quarterfinals
2	San Miguel Beermen	8	3	.727 (Note: Head-to-head quotient: San Miguel 1.17, Barangay Ginebra 0.99, Phoenix Super LPG 0.98, Meralco 0.89)	1	Twice-to-beat in quarterfinals
3	Barangay Ginebra San Miguel	8	3	.727	1	Twice-to-beat in quarterfinals
4	Phoenix Super LPG Fuel Masters	8	3	.727	1	Twice-to-beat in quarterfinals
5	Meralco Bolts	8	3	.727	1	Twice-to-win in quarterfinals
6	NorthPort Batang Pier	6	5	.545 (Note: Head-to-head record: NorthPort 1–0 Rain or Shine)	3	Twice-to-win in quarterfinals
7	Rain or Shine Elasto Painters	6	5	.545	3	Twice-to-win in quarterfinals
8	TNT Tropang Giga	5	6	.455	4	Twice-to-win in quarterfinals
9	NLEX Road Warriors	4	7	.364	5	
10	Terrafirma Dyip	2	9	.182	7	
11	Blackwater Bossing	1	10	.091 (Note: Head-to-head record: Blackwater 1–0 Converge)	8	
12	Converge FiberXers	1	10	.091	8	

Source: PBA.ph
Rules for classification: 1) winning percentage; 2) if two teams are tied, head-to-head record; if three or more teams are tied, head-to-head goal average (quotient); if tied for 8th, one-game playoff; 3) overall quotient; 4) coin toss

==== Game log ====
2023–24 PBA Commissioner's Cup game log
Total: 9–2
November: 4–0

Game	Date	Opponent	Score	High points	High rebounds	High assists	Location Attendance	Record
1	November 5	TNT	W 110–102	Tyler Bey (31)	Tyler Bey (20)	Jio Jalalon (6)	Smart Araneta Coliseum	1–0
2	November 12	Phoenix Super LPG	W 107–92	Tyler Bey (32)	Tyler Bey (16)	Mark Barroca (8)	Ynares Center	2–0
3	November 17	NorthPort	W 112–74	Tyler Bey (25)	Tyler Bey (8)	Bey, Lee (6)	Smart Araneta Coliseum	3–0
4	November 19	Barangay Ginebra	W 93–91	Tyler Bey (31)	Tyler Bey (10)	Paul Lee (7)	Smart Araneta Coliseum	4–0

December: 5–1

Game	Date	Opponent	Score	High points	High rebounds	High assists	Location Attendance	Record
5	December 1	NLEX	W 99–72	Tyler Bey (23)	Abu Tratter (9)	Mark Barroca (9)	PhilSports Arena	5–0
6	December 6	Blackwater	W 105–84	Tyler Bey (26)	Tyler Bey (22)	Mark Barroca (8)	PhilSports Arena	6–0
7	December 10	San Miguel	W 94–90	Tyler Bey (31)	Tyler Bey (21)	Jio Jalalon (11)	PhilSports Arena	7–0
8	December 16	Rain or Shine	L 110–113	Tyler Bey (30)	Tyler Bey (11)	Mark Barroca (7)	Aquilino Q. Pimentel Jr. International Convention Center	7–1
9	December 20	Terrafirma	W 104–91	Tyler Bey (25)	Tyler Bey (12)	Bey, Lee (7)	Smart Araneta Coliseum	8–1
10	December 23	Converge	W 88–80	Tyler Bey (27)	Tyler Bey (13)	Barroca, Jalalon (5)	Smart Araneta Coliseum	9–1

January: 0–1

Game	Date	Opponent	Score	High points	High rebounds	High assists	Location Attendance	Record
11	January 6	Meralco	L 80–85	Tyler Bey (23)	Tyler Bey (16)	Paul Lee (4)	University of San Agustin Gym	9–2

=== Playoffs ===
==== Bracket ====
Quarterfinals (Top 4 twice-to-beat)
1	Magnolia	109
8	TNT	94
4	Phoenix Super LPG	107	88
5	Meralco	116***	84
2	San Miguel	127
7	Rain or Shine	122
3	Barangay Ginebra	106
6	NorthPort	93

Semifinals (Best-of-5)
1	Magnolia	3
4	Phoenix Super LPG	1
2	San Miguel	3
3	Barangay Ginebra	0

Finals (Best-of-7)
1	Magnolia	2
2	San Miguel	4

***Game went into triple overtime

==== Game log ====
2023–24 PBA Commissioner's Cup playoffs game log
Total: 6–5
Quarterfinals: 1–0

Game	Date	Opponent	Score	High points	High rebounds	High assists	Location Attendance	Series
1	January 17	TNT	W 109–94	Tyler Bey (41)	Tyler Bey (13)	Jio Jalalon (5)	PhilSports Arena	1–0

Semifinals: 3–1

Game	Date	Opponent	Score	High points	High rebounds	High assists	Location Attendance	Series
1	January 24	Phoenix Super LPG	W 82–79	Tyler Bey (23)	Tyler Bey (10)	Jio Jalalon (7)	Smart Araneta Coliseum	1–0
2	January 26	Phoenix Super LPG	W 82–78	Tyler Bey (25)	Tyler Bey (12)	Mark Barroca (5)	SM Mall of Asia Arena	2–0
3	January 28	Phoenix Super LPG	L 85–103	Tyler Bey (18)	Tyler Bey (12)	Jio Jalalon (9)	SM Mall of Asia Arena	2–1
4	January 31	Phoenix Super LPG	W 89–79	Mark Barroca (21)	Tyler Bey (20)	Paul Lee (6)	SM Mall of Asia Arena	3–1

Finals: 2–4

Game	Date	Opponent	Score	High points	High rebounds	High assists	Location Attendance	Series
1	February 2	San Miguel	L 95–103	Tyler Bey (26)	Tyler Bey (15)	Jio Jalalon (12)	SM Mall of Asia Arena	0–1
2	February 4	San Miguel	L 85–109	Tyler Bey (22)	Tyler Bey (16)	Paul Lee (5)	SM Mall of Asia Arena	0–2
3	February 7	San Miguel	W 88–80	Mark Barroca (20)	Abueva, Jalalon (7)	Mark Barroca (6)	Smart Araneta Coliseum	1–2
4	February 9	San Miguel	W 96–85	Tyler Bey (26)	Tyler Bey (12)	Mark Barroca (6)	Smart Araneta Coliseum	2–2
5	February 11	San Miguel	L 98–108	Tyler Bey (34)	Bey, Sangalang (8)	Mark Barroca (7)	Smart Araneta Coliseum	2–3
6	February 14	San Miguel	L 102–104	Paul Lee (25)	Abueva, Bey (8)	Jio Jalalon (9)	Smart Araneta Coliseum	2–4

== Philippine Cup ==
=== Eliminations ===
==== Standings ====
Pos	Team	W	L	PCT	GB	Qualification
1	San Miguel Beermen	10	1	.909	—	Twice-to-beat in the quarterfinals
2	Barangay Ginebra San Miguel	7	4	.636	3	Twice-to-beat in the quarterfinals
3	Meralco Bolts	6	5	.545 (Note: Head-to-head quotient: Meralco 1.06, TNT 1.03, Rain or Shine 1.01, NLEX 0.99, Magnolia 0.90)	4	Best-of-three quarterfinals
4	TNT Tropang Giga	6	5	.545	4	Best-of-three quarterfinals
5	Rain or Shine Elasto Painters	6	5	.545	4	Best-of-three quarterfinals
6	NLEX Road Warriors	6	5	.545	4	Best-of-three quarterfinals
7	Magnolia Chicken Timplados Hotshots	6	5	.545	4	Twice-to-win in the quarterfinals
8	Terrafirma Dyip	5	6	.455 (Note: Eighth seed playoff: Terrafirma 104–96 NorthPort)	5	Twice-to-win in the quarterfinals
9	NorthPort Batang Pier	5	6	.455	5	
10	Blackwater Bossing	4	7	.364	6	
11	Phoenix Fuel Masters	3	8	.273	7	
12	Converge FiberXers	2	9	.182	8	

Source: PBA.ph
Rules for classification: 1) winning percentage; 2) if two teams are tied, head-to-head record; if three or more teams are tied, head-to-head goal average (quotient); if tied for 8th, one-game playoff; 3) overall quotient; 4) coin toss

==== Game log ====
2024 PBA Philippine Cup game log
Total: 6–5
March: 1–1

Game	Date	Opponent	Score	High points	High rebounds	High assists	Location Attendance	Record
1	March 16	Converge	W 106–75	Ian Sangalang (17)	Calvin Abueva (8)	Jio Jalalon (7)	Rizal Memorial Coliseum	1–0
All-Star Break
2	March 31	Barangay Ginebra	L 77–87	Ian Sangalang (17)	Jio Jalalon (10)	Barroca, Lee (4)	Smart Araneta Coliseum	1–1

April: 4–3

Game	Date	Opponent	Score	High points	High rebounds	High assists	Location Attendance	Record
3	April 6	NLEX	L 74–87	Escoto, Sangalang (13)	Ian Sangalang (10)	Barroca, Jalalon, Lee (4)	Ninoy Aquino Stadium	1–2
4	April 10	NorthPort	W 104–97	Ian Sangalang (32)	Ian Sangalang (13)	Mark Barroca (10)	Ninoy Aquino Stadium	2–2
5	April 14	Phoenix	W 107–93	Mark Barroca (27)	Calvin Abueva (11)	Ian Sangalang (5)	Ninoy Aquino Stadium	3–2
6	April 17	Blackwater	W 81–77	Mark Barroca (19)	Calvin Abueva (13)	Paul Lee (4)	Ninoy Aquino Stadium	4–2
7	April 20	Rain or Shine	W 108–102	Ian Sangalang (25)	Abueva, Sangalang (12)	Mark Barroca (9)	Tiaong Convention Center	5–2
8	April 26	San Miguel	L 91–98	Paul Lee (23)	Aris Dionisio (10)	Mark Barroca (9)	Smart Araneta Coliseum	5–3
9	April 28	Meralco	L 51–74	Ian Sangalang (8)	Ian Sangalang (10)	dela Rosa, Sangalang (2)	PhilSports Arena	5–4

May: 1–1

Game	Date	Opponent	Score	High points	High rebounds	High assists	Location Attendance	Record
10	May 3	Terrafirma	W 108–100	Ian Sangalang (23)	Rafi Reavis (13)	Paul Lee (7)	PhilSports Arena	6–4
11	May 5	TNT	L 93–98	Mark Barroca (22)	Dionisio, Sangalang (7)	Paul Lee (5)	Ninoy Aquino Stadium	6–5

=== Playoffs ===
==== Bracket ====
Quarterfinals
(#1 twice-to-beat)
1	San Miguel	95	110
8	Terrafirma	106	91
(Best-of-3)
4	TNT	1
5	Rain or Shine	2
(#2 twice-to-beat)
2	Barangay Ginebra	99
7	Magnolia	77
(Best-of-3)
3	Meralco	2
6	NLEX	0

Semifinals (Best-of-7)
1	San Miguel	4
5	Rain or Shine	0
2	Barangay Ginebra	3
3	Meralco	4

Finals (Best-of-7)
1	San Miguel	2
3	Meralco	4

==== Game log ====
2024 PBA Philippine Cup playoffs game log
Total: 0–1
Quarterfinals: 0–1

Game	Date	Opponent	Score	High points	High rebounds	High assists	Location Attendance	Series
1	May 11	Barangay Ginebra	L 77–99	Mark Barroca (19)	Calvin Abueva (9)	Mark Barroca (8)	Rizal Memorial Coliseum	0–1

== Transactions ==
=== Free agency ===
==== Signings ====
Player	Date signed	Contract amount	Contract length	Former team
Jerrick Ahanmisi	May 30, 2023	Not disclosed	2 years	Re-signed
Joseph Eriobu	August 22, 2023	Not disclosed	1 year	Purefoods TJ Titans (PBA 3x3)
Calvin Abueva	December 20, 2023	Not disclosed	3 years	Re-signed
Russel Escoto	February 4, 2024	Not disclosed	1 year	Re-signed
Aris Dionisio	March 12, 2024	Not disclosed	3 years	Re-signed

==== Subtractions ====
Player	Number	Position	Reason	New team
Keith Zaldivar	25	Center	End of contract	Converge FiberXers
David Murrell	11	Small forward	Free agent	Barangay Ginebra San Miguel

=== Trades ===
==== Pre-season ====
April
April 14, 2023	To Magnolia David Murrell; Abu Tratter	To Converge Adrian Wong 2023 Magnolia first-round pick (No. 10)

==== Philippine Cup ====
April
April 11, 2024	To Magnolia Jerrick Balanza	To Converge 2024 Magnolia second-round pick

=== Recruited imports ===
Tournament	Name	Debuted	Last game	Record
Commissioner's Cup	Tyler Bey	November 5, 2023 (vs. TNT)	February 14, 2024 (vs. San Miguel)	15–7
