= RK Ilagan =

Filipino basketball player (born 1997)

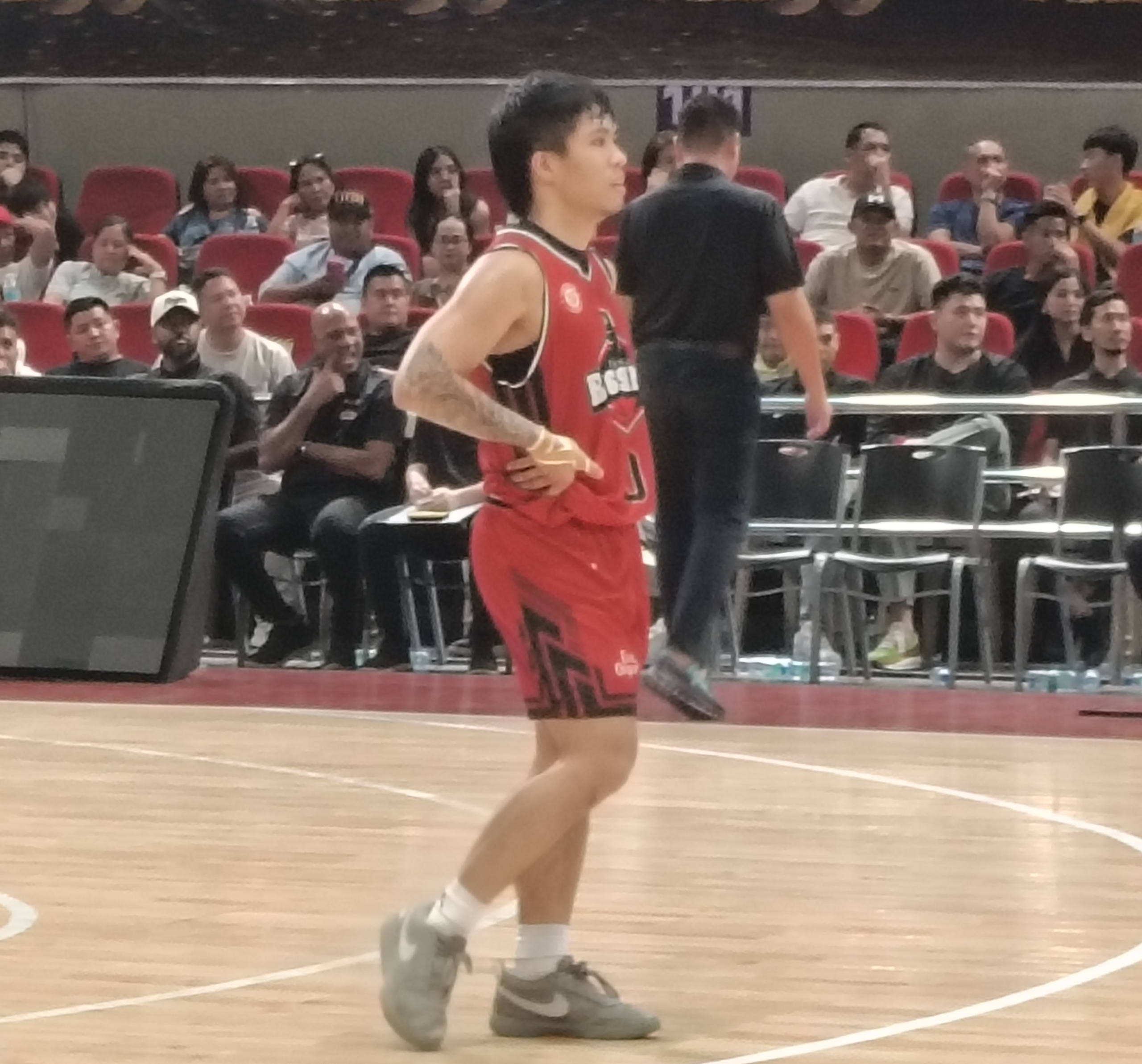
- Ilagan in 2025

No. 0 – Blackwater Bossing
- Position: Point guard
- League: PBA

Personal information
- Born: April 3, 1997 (age 29) Tondo, Manila, Philippines
- Listed height: 5 ft 7 in (1.70 m)
- Listed weight: 150 lb (68 kg)

Career information
- High school: San Sebastian (Manila)
- College: San Sebastian
- PBA draft: 2020: 3rd round31st overall (Note: The 2021 draft was composed of two drafts: the Gilas special round, which consists of 4 players reserved for the Gilas Pilipinas program, and the regular draft. Ilagan was selected as the thirty-first pick of the regular draft.)
- Drafted by: Alaska Aces
- Playing career: 2021–present

Career history
- 2021–2022: Alaska Aces
- 2022: Converge FiberXers
- 2023–present: Blackwater Bossing

Regille Kent Ilagan (born April 3, 1997) is a Filipino professional basketball player for the Blackwater Bossing of the Philippine Basketball Association (PBA). He played college basketball for the San Sebastian Stags, where he gained a reputation as one of the best amateur shooters in the country. In the PBA, he is known as a clutch scorer.

== Early life ==
Ilagan was born in Manila, and raised in Bulacan until Grade 5, when he went back to Manila when his parents gave in to his desire to play varsity basketball.

Ilagan first tried out for the high school team of San Sebastian. After failing to crack that lineup, he tried out for the NU Bullpups, but that didn't work out either. After participating in the Junior NBA program did he finally get to play for the San Sebastian Staglets.

In Season 90, Ilagan had 22 points against the San Beda Red Cubs. He stayed with the Staglets for two years before moving up to the Stags' Team B.

== College career ==
Ilagan first played for the San Sebastian Stags in NCAA Season 92. In both of their matchups against the Arellano Chiefs, he helped the Stags rally but fell short both times as Arellano won their matchups. In the 3-Point Shootout during All-Star festivities, he made it to the final round before losing to San Beda's AC Soberano. After the break, the Stags went on a four-game winning streak, with him hitting seven three pointers for 25 points against the Lyceum Pirates in their fourth straight win. Their streak was broken in a loss to the Letran Knights, in which he only scored one point. San Sebastian finished with a record of 8–10, not making it to the Final Four.

In Season 93, after their opening loss to San Beda, Ilagan contributed nine points and seven rebounds in a win over Arellano. He lost once again in the 3-Point Shootout, this time to Mapua's Almel Olquina. With a shot for a Final Four spot on the line, he had 23 points and five rebounds in a blowout win over the Perpetual Altas. His performance trended on Twitter. His teammates Michael Calisaan and Ryan Costelo then scored big in the fourth-seed playoff against Letran to officially make the Final Four for the first time since Season 89. In the first round, they faced the JRU Heavy Bombers. He then unloaded 21 points with five three-pointers against them to move on to the next round. There, their season ended in a loss to the San Beda Red Lions.

In Season 94, Ilagan became one of the veterans of the team, and expectations were that they would contend for the championship that season. He had 18 points and four assists against Lyceum, but he fouled out with a technical foul, costing San Sebastian the win. He then got injured in a loss against Arellano with a cut over his right eye, but was still able to finish the game. With his team already struggling, he was then investigated for playing in a "ligang labas". As a result, San Sebastian College suspended him for the rest of the first elimination round. The NCAA also forfeited the Stags' two wins in the first round in which he played in, which sank them to the bottom of the standings. He apologized to his team, and returned with 13 points in a loss to Lyceum. The Stags got a win in a match against the EAC Generals, with him leading the team with 13 points. He then got a career-high 26 points on 10-of-15 shooting with six triples in a blowout win over the Mapúa Cardinals. The Stags then ended their season with a big win over Arellano.

Once again, the Stags were heavy favorites for Season 95. They opened the season with a 31-point blowout victory over JRU, with him leading the team with 25 points built on five treys, to go with five assists, three rebounds, and two steals. Against Mapúa, they scored 30 points in the 2nd quarter for their second straight victory. He scored 20 points, eight assists and four rebounds in that win. However, he was shut down by Lyceum's defense as he was held to 0 points, the first time in his college career. He then scored 22 points and made seven assists in a close win over Letran. Against Arellano he scored eight of his 20 points in the fourth quarter as his team went on to get the win. The Stags qualified for the semis once again, where they faced Letran. In that game, he had cramps for majority of the second half, but he fought through it and led a rally from 17 points down to just a one-point deficit. His efforts weren't good enough, as Letran beat them and moved on to the next round. At the end of the game, he had finished with a career-high 36 points (with 13 of them in the fourth quarter) on 7-of-13 shooting from three while also collecting six rebounds and three assists. He finished his season with averages of nearly 16 points a game on 32 percent shooting from the three-point area, four rebounds and four assists per game. He also got to play in that year's All-Star Game.

Before the start of Season 96, Ilagan was set to lead San Sebastian once again. However, those plans were derailed when he decided to forgo his final year in the NCAA.

== Professional career ==
=== Alaska Aces (2021–2022) ===
Ilagan then confirmed that he would be entering the PBA season 46 draft. He came in as one of the shortest players in that year's draft. Before the draft, he worked out with Rain or Shine and Alaska. He was projected to be a second-round pick. However, he found himself slipping to the third round until the Alaska Aces drafted him. Alaska drafted him as the "pure point guard" of the team. He was signed to a one-year contract.

Ilagan made his PBA debut against the Blackwater Bossing, in which he had eight points on a perfect 3-of-3 from the field including two threes in just under two minutes. Days later, he pulled his hamstring, causing him to be out. He returned in a loss to the NLEX Road Warriors. In the Governors' Cup, he earned more of Coach Jeffrey Cariaso's trust. He scored a PBA career-high 11 points in a win against the Meralco Bolts with his last points being a game-winning buzzer-beating mid-range shot. He led the team with a PBA career-high 14 points in a loss to the Magnolia Hotshots.

=== Converge FiberXers (2022) ===
Before the start of the 2022–23 PBA season, Ilagan re-signed with the Converge FiberXers, the franchise that had acquired Alaska, on another one-year deal. Against Magnolia, he made a triple that sent the game into overtime and capped a comeback from 20 points down. Converge was able to get its first win in overtime, and he finished the game with 14 points, four rebounds, and two steals. The next game, against the TNT Tropang Giga, he didn't make any shots until the final 22 seconds of the game, which gave his side an 83–82 lead. On his team's next possession, he had the chance to make it a three-point lead with two free throws, but he missed both shots. TNT guard Jayson Castro was able to win the game for his side on a layup over Ilagan, and Converge sealed their fate by turning it over. Afterwards, Castro consoled him and told him not to lose confidence. In a win against NLEX, he had a career-high 10 assists. He then led Converge to its 2nd straight win a new PBA career-high of 20 points against the NorthPort Batang Pier. They qualified for the Philippine Cup playoffs, where they were eliminated by TNT in the first round. He broke his PBA career-high once again with 22 points in a win over the Phoenix Super LPG Fuel Masters during the PBA Commissioner's Cup.

=== Blackwater Bossing (2023–present) ===
On January 3, 2023, Ilagan, along with Michael DiGregorio and Tyrus Hill, was traded to the Blackwater Bossing for Barkley Eboña and a 2022 first-round pick. During the 2023 PBA All-Star Weekend, he competed in both the Three-Point Shootout and in the Team Greats vs. Team Stalwarts game.

In a 2024 Philippine Cup win over TNT, Ilagan stepped up for an injured Rey Nambatac and had a near triple-double with 15 points, eight assists and seven rebounds off the bench. He then had 12 points in a win over his former team Converge. With the win, Blackwater started 3–0 and on top of the standings for a brief while. The team then lost five straight and failed to make the playoffs.

In a 2024 Governors' Cup win over Phoenix, Ilagan had 14 points, five rebounds, and five assists. In a game against TNT during the Commissioner's Cup, he went down with a knee injury. He missed three games during that conference. In a win over NorthPort during the 2025 Philippine Cup, he scored 11 of his 17 points in the fourth quarter. He then had 24 points in a loss to Ginebra. Once again, they did not make the playoffs.

== PBA career statistics ==
Legend
GP	Games played	MPG	Minutes per game	FG%	Field-goal percentage
3FG%	3-point field-goal percentage	4P%	4-point field-goal percentage	FT%	Free-throw percentage
RPG	Rebounds per game	APG	Assists per game	SPG	Steals per game
BPG	Blocks per game	PPG	Points per game	127	Career high

As of the end of 2025–26 season

=== Season-by-season averages ===
Year	Team	GP	MPG	FG%	3P%	4P%	FT%	RPG	APG	SPG	BPG	PPG
2021	Alaska	14	12.7	.327	.172	—	.882	2.4	1.9	.5	—	3.9
2022–23	Converge	37	17.4	.379	.357	—	.867	2.3	3.2	.7	—	8.5
2022–23	Blackwater	37	17.4	.379	.357	—	.867	2.3	3.2	.7	—	8.5
2023–24	Blackwater	20	19.1	.419	.322	—	.875	3.1	3.1	.9	.2	8.7
2024–25	Blackwater	26	21.0	.466	.469	.258	.911	2.5	3.4	.6	.0	9.7
2025–26	Blackwater	17	26.4	.469	.414	.320	.900	3.5	2.8	1.9	.1	14.2
Career		114	19.3	.420	.362	.286	.889	2.7	3.0	.9	.0	9.1
