= List of Converge FiberXers seasons =

The Converge FiberXers joined the Philippine Basketball Association (PBA) in 2022 following the acquisition of the Alaska Aces franchise of Alaska Milk Corporation by Converge ICT. The team began play in the 2022–23 PBA season.

== Records per conference ==
Note: Statistics are correct as of the end of the 2025 PBA Philippine Cup.

Conference champions	Conference runners-up	Conference semifinalists	Playoff berth

Season	Conference	Elimination round						Playoffs	
Season	Conference	Finish	Played	Wins	Losses	Win %	GB	Round	Results
Converge FiberXers
2022–23 (team)	Philippine	7th	11	5	6	.455	4	Quarterfinals	lost vs. TNT, 95–116 (Note: Opposing team had a twice-to-beat advantage.)
2022–23 (team)	Commissioner's	4th	12	8	4	.667	2	Quarterfinals	lost vs. San Miguel, 0–2
2022–23 (team)	Governors'	7th	11	6	5	.545	4	Quarterfinals	lost vs. San Miguel, 105–121
2023–24 (team)	Commissioner's	12th	11	1	10	.091	8	Did not qualify	
2023–24 (team)	Philippine	12th	11	2	9	.182	8	Did not qualify	
2024–25 (team)	Governors'	3rd (Group A)	10	6	4	.600	2	Quarterfinals	lost vs. San Miguel, 2–3
2024–25 (team)	Commissioner's	3rd	12	8	4	.667	1	Quarterfinals	lost vs. Rain or Shine, 1–2
2024–25 (team)	Philippine	5th	11	7	4	.636	1	Quarterfinals	lost vs. Barangay Ginebra, 80–88
Elimination round record			89	43	46	.483		6 playoff appearances	
Playoff record			13	3	10	.231		0 finals appearances	
Cumulative record			102	46	56	.451		0 championships	

== Records per season ==
Note: Statistics are correct as of the end of the 2025 PBA Philippine Cup.

Season	Stage	Played	Wins	Losses	Win %	Best finish
2022–23 (team)	Elimination round	34	19	15	.559	Quarterfinals
2022–23 (team)	Playoffs	4	0	4	.000	Quarterfinals
2022–23 (team)	Overall	38	19	19	.500	Quarterfinals
2023–24 (team)	Elimination round	22	3	19	.136	Elimination round (12th place)
2023–24 (team)	Playoffs	Did not qualify				Elimination round (12th place)
2023–24 (team)	Overall	22	3	19	.136	Elimination round (12th place)
2024–25 (team)	Elimination round	33	21	12	.636	Quarterfinals
2024–25 (team)	Playoffs	9	3	6	.333	Quarterfinals
2024–25 (team)	Overall	42	24	18	.571	Quarterfinals
