= 2023–24 Converge FiberXers season =

- Head coach: Aldin Ayo
- General Manager: Jacob Lao; CK Kanapi-Daniolco (assistant)
- Owner(s): Converge ICT

Commissioner's Cup results
- Record: 1–10 (9.1%)
- Place: 12th
- Playoff finish: Did not qualify

Philippine Cup results
- Record: 2–9 (18.2%)
- Place: 12th
- Playoff finish: Did not qualify

Converge FiberXers seasons

The 2023–24 Converge FiberXers season was the 2nd season of the franchise in the Philippine Basketball Association (PBA).

== Key dates ==
- September 17: The PBA season 48 draft was held at the Market! Market! in Taguig.

== Draft picks ==
Round	Pick	Player	Position	Place of birth	College
1	9	Schonny Winston	G	USA	De La Salle
1	10	BJ Andrade	G/F	Hong Kong	Ateneo
2	14	Bryan Santos	F	Philippines	UST
2	19	JL delos Santos	G	Philippines	JRU
3	31	Inand Fornilo	F	Thailand	Ateneo
4	42	King Caralipio	F	Philippines	Letran
5	53	Rhinwil Yambing	G/F	Philippines	San Sebastian
6	61	Kamron Vigan-Fleming	G/F	USA	Bethesda
7	68	Raymond Binuya	G	Philippines	San Sebastian
8	72	Jeffrey Garcia	G	Philippines	Systems Plus
9	75	Andre Flores	F	Philippines	Ateneo
10	78	Jonathan del Rosario	G	Philippines	Amando Cope

== Roster ==
2023–24 Converge FiberXers roster
Players
Coaches

Pos.	#	POB	Name	Height	Weight	DOB (YYYY–MM–DD)	From
F	0	(Thailand)	Inand Fornilos (R)	6 ft 2 in (1.88 m)	195 lb (88 kg)		Ateneo
F	1	(United States)	Kamron Vigan-Fleming (R)	6 ft 5 in (1.96 m)	183 lb (83 kg)	1998–12–23	Bethesda
G/F	2	(Hong Kong)	BJ Andrade (R)	6 ft 1 in (1.85 m)	180 lb (82 kg)	1996–07–26	Ateneo
F/C	4	(New Zealand)	Patrick Maagdenberg (R)	6 ft 5 in (1.96 m)	242 lb (110 kg)	1997–04–25	Ateneo
G/F	8	(United States)	Schonny Winston (R)	6 ft 4 in (1.93 m)	190 lb (86 kg)	1998–07–22	De La Salle
F	9	(Philippines)	Andre Flores (R)	6 ft 5 in (1.96 m)	212 lb (96 kg)	1999–07–17	Ateneo
G	11	(Philippines)	Aljun Melecio	5 ft 8 in (1.73 m)	160 lb (73 kg)	1998–07–25	De La Salle
G	12	(United States)	Alec Stockton	6 ft 2 in (1.88 m)	170 lb (77 kg)	1998–06–24	Far Eastern
C	15	(Philippines)	Justin Arana	6 ft 7 in (2.01 m)	231 lb (105 kg)	1999–03–21	Arellano
F	16	(Philippines)	Kevin Racal (FA)	6 ft 3 in (1.91 m)	175 lb (79 kg)	1991–05–16	Letran
F	17	(Philippines)	Mike Nieto	6 ft 2 in (1.88 m)	200 lb (91 kg)	1997–05–31	Ateneo
F/C	18	(Philippines)	Jeo Ambohot	6 ft 7 in (2.01 m)	193 lb (88 kg)	1996–11–18	Letran
G	24	(Philippines)	JL delos Santos (R)	5 ft 11 in (1.80 m)	176 lb (80 kg)	1999–09–12	José Rizal
C	25	(Philippines)	Keith Zaldivar	6 ft 6 in (1.98 m)		1996–05–25	Adamson
F	26	(Philippines)	Bryan Santos (R)	6 ft 5 in (1.96 m)	209 lb (95 kg)	1997–05–26	UST
F	27	(Philippines)	King Caralipio (R)	6 ft 2 in (1.88 m)	176 lb (80 kg)	1997–12–04	Letran

Head coach

- (Philippines) Aldin Ayo

Assistant coach(es)

- (Philippines) McJour Luib (1st assistant)
- (Philippines) Franco Atienza
- (Philippines) Danny Ildefonso
- (Philippines) Willie Miller
- (Philippines) Karl Santos
- (Serbia) Rajko Toroman (consultant)

Team manager

- (Philippines) Jacob Lao
- (Philippines) CK Kanapi-Daniolco (assistant)

Legend

- (C) Team captain
- (CI) Commissioner's Cup Import
- (GI) Governors' Cup Import
- (EI) EASL Import
- (DP) Unsigned draft pick
- (FA) Free agent
- (IN) Inactive
- (S) Suspended
- (R) Rookie
- Injured

Roster

== Preseason ==
=== PBA on Tour ===
==== Game log ====
2023 PBA on Tour game log
Total: 6–5
May: 1–1

Game	Date	Opponent	Score	High points	High rebounds	High assists	Location Attendance	Record
1	May 26	Terrafirma	W 119–82	Arana, Balanza (24)	Arana, Nieto (12)	Alec Stockton (8)	Ynares Sports Arena	1–0
2	May 31	Magnolia	L 95–99	Kevin Racal (22)	Jeo Ambohot (5)	Alec Stockton (5)	Ynares Sports Arena	1–1

June: 2–3

Game	Date	Opponent	Score	High points	High rebounds	High assists	Location Attendance	Record
3	June 4	Meralco	L 88–96	Jeron Teng (21)	Justin Arana (15)	Alec Stockton (7)	Ynares Center	1–2
4	June 14	Blackwater	L 97–102	Justin Arana (32)	Justin Arana (17)	Alec Stockton (5)	Ynares Sports Arena	1–3
5	June 18	San Miguel	W 113–111 (OT)	Alec Stockton (23)	Kevin Racal (10)	Alec Stockton (9)	Ynares Sports Arena	2–3
6	June 21	TNT	W 109–84	Jeo Ambohot (31)	Justin Arana (14)	Justin Arana (6)	Ynares Sports Arena	3–3
7	June 30	Rain or Shine	L 110–127	Justin Arana (25)	Justin Arana (18)	Alec Stockton (12)	Ynares Sports Arena	3–4

July: 3–1

Game	Date	Opponent	Score	High points	High rebounds	High assists	Location Attendance	Record
8	July 7	Phoenix Super LPG	W 104–90	Jolo Mendoza (26)	Alec Stockton (10)	Alec Stockton (15)	Ynares Sports Arena	4–4
9	July 16	Barangay Ginebra	W 123–95	Justin Arana (30)	Justin Arana (15)	Alec Stockton (7)	Filoil EcoOil Centre	5–4
10	July 21	NLEX	L 104–112	Jolo Mendoza (23)	Kevin Racal (12)	Alec Stockton (11)	Ynares Sports Arena	5–5
11	July 28	NorthPort	W 113–84	Adrian Wong (23)	Mike Nieto (13)	McJour Luib (10)	Ynares Sports Arena	6–5

=== Converge Pocket Tournament ===
==== Game log ====
2023 PBA Converge Pocket Tournament game log
Total: 3–0
October: 3–0

Game	Date	Opponent	Score	High points	High rebounds	High assists	Location Attendance	Record
1	October 13	Blackwater	W 87–75	Alec Stockton (13)	Tom Vodanovich (12)	Alec Stockton (6)	Gatorade Hoops Center	1–0
2	October 15	Rain or Shine	W 120–111	Tom Vodanovich (27)	Tom Vodanovich (13)	Alec Stockton (5)	Gatorade Hoops Center	2–0
3	October 17	Phoenix Super LPG	W 97–93	Balanza, Vodanovich (18)	Tom Vodanovich (17)	Alec Stockton (5)	Gatorade Hoops Center	3–0

== Commissioner's Cup ==
=== Eliminations ===
==== Standings ====
Pos	Team	W	L	PCT	GB	Qualification
1	Magnolia Chicken Timplados Hotshots	9	2	.818	—	Twice-to-beat in quarterfinals
2	San Miguel Beermen	8	3	.727 (Note: Head-to-head quotient: San Miguel 1.17, Barangay Ginebra 0.99, Phoenix Super LPG 0.98, Meralco 0.89)	1	Twice-to-beat in quarterfinals
3	Barangay Ginebra San Miguel	8	3	.727	1	Twice-to-beat in quarterfinals
4	Phoenix Super LPG Fuel Masters	8	3	.727	1	Twice-to-beat in quarterfinals
5	Meralco Bolts	8	3	.727	1	Twice-to-win in quarterfinals
6	NorthPort Batang Pier	6	5	.545 (Note: Head-to-head record: NorthPort 1–0 Rain or Shine)	3	Twice-to-win in quarterfinals
7	Rain or Shine Elasto Painters	6	5	.545	3	Twice-to-win in quarterfinals
8	TNT Tropang Giga	5	6	.455	4	Twice-to-win in quarterfinals
9	NLEX Road Warriors	4	7	.364	5	
10	Terrafirma Dyip	2	9	.182	7	
11	Blackwater Bossing	1	10	.091 (Note: Head-to-head record: Blackwater 1–0 Converge)	8	
12	Converge FiberXers	1	10	.091	8	

Source: PBA.ph
Rules for classification: 1) winning percentage; 2) if two teams are tied, head-to-head record; if three or more teams are tied, head-to-head goal average (quotient); if tied for 8th, one-game playoff; 3) overall quotient; 4) coin toss

==== Game log ====
2023–24 PBA Commissioner's Cup game log
Total: 1–10
November: 0–4

Game	Date	Opponent	Score	High points	High rebounds	High assists	Location Attendance	Record
1	November 8	Blackwater	L 84–103	Tom Vodanovich (20)	Tom Vodanovich (18)	Racal, Stockton, Vodanovich, Winston (3)	PhilSports Arena	0–1
2	November 11	TNT	L 98–101 (OT)	Tom Vodanovich (25)	Tom Vodanovich (9)	Tom Vodanovich (7)	Ynares Center	0–2
3	November 17	Barangay Ginebra	L 86–100	Justin Arana (20)	Justin Arana (8)	Stockton, Vodanovich (4)	Smart Araneta Coliseum	0–3
4	November 25	San Miguel	L 96–105	Aljun Melecio (17)	Tom Vodanovich (20)	Aljun Melecio (5)	Tiaong Convention Center	0–4

December: 1–4

Game	Date	Opponent	Score	High points	High rebounds	High assists	Location Attendance	Record
5	December 2	Phoenix Super LPG	L 98–99	Tom Vodanovich (35)	Santos, Vodanovich (9)	Aljun Melecio (9)	PhilSports Arena	0–5
6	December 6	NorthPort	L 95–111	Jamil Wilson (30)	Jamil Wilson (13)	Jerrick Balanza (5)	PhilSports Arena	0–6
7	December 13	Terrafirma	W 103–94 (OT)	Jamil Wilson (32)	Jamil Wilson (10)	Jamil Wilson (5)	PhilSports Arena	1–6
8	December 17	Meralco	L 99–105	Justin Arana (25)	Arana, Wilson (11)	Jamil Wilson (6)	Ynares Center	1–7
9	December 23	Magnolia	L 80–88	Jamil Wilson (19)	Jamil Wilson (10)	Jerrick Balanza (6)	Smart Araneta Coliseum	1–8

January: 0–2

Game	Date	Opponent	Score	High points	High rebounds	High assists	Location Attendance	Record
10	January 10	NLEX	L 103–107	Jamil Wilson (50)	Jamil Wilson (14)	Stockton, Wilson (4)	Smart Araneta Coliseum	1–9
11	January 14	Rain or Shine	L 111–112	Jamil Wilson (26)	Jamil Wilson (13)	Jamil Wilson (9)	PhilSports Arena	1–10

== Philippine Cup ==
=== Eliminations ===
==== Standings ====
Pos	Team	W	L	PCT	GB	Qualification
1	San Miguel Beermen	10	1	.909	—	Twice-to-beat in the quarterfinals
2	Barangay Ginebra San Miguel	7	4	.636	3	Twice-to-beat in the quarterfinals
3	Meralco Bolts	6	5	.545 (Note: Head-to-head quotient: Meralco 1.06, TNT 1.03, Rain or Shine 1.01, NLEX 0.99, Magnolia 0.90)	4	Best-of-three quarterfinals
4	TNT Tropang Giga	6	5	.545	4	Best-of-three quarterfinals
5	Rain or Shine Elasto Painters	6	5	.545	4	Best-of-three quarterfinals
6	NLEX Road Warriors	6	5	.545	4	Best-of-three quarterfinals
7	Magnolia Chicken Timplados Hotshots	6	5	.545	4	Twice-to-win in the quarterfinals
8	Terrafirma Dyip	5	6	.455 (Note: Eighth seed playoff: Terrafirma 104–96 NorthPort)	5	Twice-to-win in the quarterfinals
9	NorthPort Batang Pier	5	6	.455	5	
10	Blackwater Bossing	4	7	.364	6	
11	Phoenix Fuel Masters	3	8	.273	7	
12	Converge FiberXers	2	9	.182	8	

Source: PBA.ph
Rules for classification: 1) winning percentage; 2) if two teams are tied, head-to-head record; if three or more teams are tied, head-to-head goal average (quotient); if tied for 8th, one-game playoff; 3) overall quotient; 4) coin toss

==== Game log ====
2024 PBA Philippine Cup game log
Total: 2–9
March: 0–5

Game	Date	Opponent	Score	High points	High rebounds	High assists	Location Attendance	Record
1	March 1	Terrafirma	L 99–107	Arana, Stockton (18)	Arana, Fornilos, Maagdenberg (6)	Inand Fornilos (4)	Smart Araneta Coliseum	0–1
2	March 3	NorthPort	L 104–112 (OT)	Alec Stockton (27)	Justin Arana (13)	Arana, Caralipio, delos Santos, Fornilos (3)	Smart Araneta Coliseum	0–2
3	March 6	Blackwater	L 78–90	Alec Stockton (24)	Inand Fornilos (9)	Alec Stockton (4)	Smart Araneta Coliseum	0–3
4	March 9	NLEX	L 93–115	Justin Arana (20)	King Caralipio (6)	Arana, delos Santos (4)	Smart Araneta Coliseum	0–4
5	March 16	Magnolia	L 75–106	Justin Arana (17)	delos Santos, Fornilos (7)	Santos, Stockton (3)	Rizal Memorial Coliseum	0–5
All-Star Break

April: 1–4

Game	Date	Opponent	Score	High points	High rebounds	High assists	Location Attendance	Record
6	April 3	Rain or Shine	L 90–110	Justin Arana (20)	Justin Arana (9)	delos Santos, Stockton (4)	Smart Araneta Coliseum	0–6
7	April 12	Phoenix	L 107–113	Justin Arana (32)	Justin Arana (16)	JL delos Santos (9)	PhilSports Arena	0–7
8	April 19	San Miguel	L 103–112	Alec Stockton (36)	King Caralipio (9)	Schonny Winston (6)	PhilSports Arena	0–8
9	April 21	Meralco	W 104–99	Bryan Santos (22)	Arana, Winston (7)	Justin Arana (7)	PhilSports Arena	1–8
10	April 27	Barangay Ginebra	L 93–105	Alec Stockton (32)	King Caralipio (10)	Alec Stockton (6)	Aquilino Q. Pimentel Jr. International Convention Center	1–9

May: 1–0

Game	Date	Opponent	Score	High points	High rebounds	High assists	Location Attendance	Record
11	May 1	TNT	W 107–103	Aljun Melecio (17)	Justin Arana (8)	Alec Stockton (6)	PhilSports Arena	2–9

== Transactions ==
=== Free agency ===
==== Signings ====
Player	Date signed	Contract amount	Contract length	Former team
Kevin Racal	April 18, 2023	Not disclosed	2 years	Re-signed
Jerrick Balanza	May 30, 2023	Not disclosed	2 years	Re-signed
Aljun Melecio	June 2, 2023	Not disclosed	Not disclosed	Re-signed
Keith Zaldivar	June 10, 2023	Not disclosed	Not disclosed	Magnolia Hotshots
Mike Nieto	June 28, 2023	Not disclosed	2 years	Re-signed
Mac Tallo	October 21, 2023	Not disclosed	Not disclosed	Chooks-to-Go 3x3
Justin Arana	March 16, 2024	₱420,000 per month (max. contract)	3 years	Re-signed
Alec Stockton	March 16, 2024	₱420,000 per month (max. contract)	3 years	Re-signed

==== Subtractions ====
Player	Number	Position	Reason	New team
Maverick Ahanmisi	13	Point guard / Shooting guard	End of contract	Barangay Ginebra San Miguel
Jeron Teng	21	Small forward / Shooting guard	End of contract	San Miguel Beermen
Mac Tallo	13	Point guard / Shooting guard	Contract termination	Abra Weavers (MPBL)
Barkley Eboña	4, 8	Power forward / Center	Free agent	TNT Tropang Giga

=== Trades ===
==== Pre-season ====
April
April 14, 2023	To Converge Adrian Wong 2023 Magnolia first-round pick	To Magnolia David Murrell; Abu Tratter
May
May 8, 2023	To Converge Mike Nieto	To Rain or Shine 2024 Converge second-round pick 2025 Converge second-round pick

==== Philippine Cup ====
April
April 11, 2024	To Converge 2024 Magnolia second-round pick	To Magnolia Jerrick Balanza

=== Recruited imports ===
Tournament	Name	Debuted	Last game	Record
Commissioner's Cup	Tom Vodanovich	November 8, 2023 (vs. Blackwater)	December 2, 2023 (vs. Phoenix Super LPG)	0–5
Commissioner's Cup	Jamil Wilson	December 6, 2023 (vs. NorthPort)	January 14, 2024 (vs. Rain or Shine)	1–5
