= 2023–24 Blackwater Bossing season =

- Head coach: Jeffrey Cariaso
- General Manager: Johnson Martinez; Rhona Tibor (assistant)
- Owner(s): Ever Bilena Cosmetics, Inc.

Commissioner's Cup results
- Record: 1–10 (9.1%)
- Place: 11th
- Playoff finish: Did not qualify

Philippine Cup results
- Record: 4–7 (36.4%)
- Place: 10th
- Playoff finish: Did not qualify

Blackwater Bossing seasons

The 2023–24 Blackwater Bossing season was the 9th season of the franchise in the Philippine Basketball Association (PBA).

== Key dates ==
- September 17: The PBA season 48 draft was held at the Market! Market! in Taguig.

== Draft picks ==
Round	Pick	Player	Position	Place of birth	College
1	2	Christian David	F	Canada	Butler
2	20	James Kwekuteye	G	Canada	San Beda
3	26	Clifford Jopia	C	Philippines	San Beda
4	37	Archie Concepcion	G	Philippines	Arellano
5	48	Dariel Bayla	F	Philippines	Arellano

== Roster ==
2023–24 Blackwater Bossing roster
Players
Coaches

Pos.	#	POB	Name	Height	Weight	DOB (YYYY–MM–DD)	From
G	0	(Philippines)	RK Ilagan	5 ft 7 in (1.70 m)	150 lb (68 kg)	1997–04–03	San Sebastian
G	1	(United States)	Michael DiGregorio (FA)	6 ft 1 in (1.85 m)	185 lb (84 kg)	1991–12–12	McKendree
G/F	2	(Philippines)	Archie Concepcion (R / FA)	6 ft 2 in (1.88 m)	189 lb (86 kg)		Arellano
G/F	4	(Philippines)	Rey Suerte	6 ft 3 in (1.91 m)	175 lb (79 kg)	1994–10–04	UE
G/F	5	(Philippines)	Jaydee Tungcab	6 ft 3 in (1.91 m)	196 lb (89 kg)	1997–05–05	Philippines
G	6	(Philippines)	JVee Casio (C)	5 ft 10 in (1.78 m)	175 lb (79 kg)	1986–09–01	De La Salle
G	7	(Canada)	James Kwekuteye (R)	6 ft 2 in (1.88 m)	182 lb (83 kg)	1998–08–15	San Beda
F/C	8	(Philippines)	Bradwyn Guinto	6 ft 6 in (1.98 m)	220 lb (100 kg)	1991–10–20	San Sebastian
C	9	(Philippines)	Justin Chua	6 ft 6 in (1.98 m)	232 lb (105 kg)	1989–07–13	Ateneo
C	13	(Philippines)	Clifford Jopia (R)	6 ft 8 in (2.03 m)	220 lb (100 kg)	1998–05–11	San Beda
G/F	15	(Philippines)	James Yap	6 ft 2 in (1.88 m)	192 lb (87 kg)	1982–02–15	UE
F	18	(Philippines)	Troy Rosario	6 ft 7 in (2.01 m)	198 lb (90 kg)	1992–01–20	National-U
F	23	(Philippines)	Richard Escoto	6 ft 3 in (1.91 m)	204 lb (93 kg)	1997–03–21	Far Eastern
F	25	(Canada)	Christian David (R)	6 ft 6 in (1.98 m)	215 lb (98 kg)	1998–06–19	Butler
G	27	(Philippines)	Rey Nambatac	5 ft 11 in (1.80 m)		1994–01–27	Letran
G	28	(Philippines)	Mike Ayonayon (IN)	6 ft 0 in (1.83 m)	170 lb (77 kg)	1992–12–08	Philippine Christian
F	31	(Philippines)	James Sena	6 ft 5 in (1.96 m)	225 lb (102 kg)	1988–08–31	José Rizal
F	33	(United States)	Tyrus Hill	6 ft 5 in (1.96 m)	185 lb (84 kg)	1996–03–20	De La Salle

Head coach

- (United States) Jeffrey Cariaso

Assistant coach(es)

- (Philippines) Joe Silva (1st assistant)
- (Philippines) Junjie Ablan
- (Philippines) Mike Cortez
- (Philippines) Aries Dimaunahan

Team manager

- (Philippines) Johnson Martinez
- (Philippines) Rhona Tibor (assistant)

Legend

- (C) Team captain
- (CI) Commissioner's Cup Import
- (GI) Governors' Cup Import
- (EI) EASL Import
- (DP) Unsigned draft pick
- (FA) Free agent
- (IN) Inactive
- (S) Suspended
- (R) Rookie
- Injured

Roster

== Preseason ==
=== PBA on Tour ===
==== Game log ====
2023 PBA on Tour game log
Total: 7–4
May: 2–1

Game	Date	Opponent	Score	High points	High rebounds	High assists	Location Attendance	Record
1	May 21	NLEX	W 93–88	Mike Ayonayon (16)	RK Ilagan (8)	Ilagan, McCarthy (4)	Caloocan Sports Complex	1–0
2	May 28	Magnolia	L 83–117	James Sena (11)	Sena, Ular (5)	RK Ilagan (5)	Ynares Sports Arena	1–1
3	May 31	Terrafirma	W 100–94	Troy Rosario (20)	Ato Ular (8)	Rashawn McCarthy (7)	Ynares Sports Arena	2–1

June: 2–2

Game	Date	Opponent	Score	High points	High rebounds	High assists	Location Attendance	Record
4	June 9	NorthPort	L 95–112	Troy Rosario (17)	Hill, Ular (7)	Rashawn McCarthy (4)	Ynares Sports Arena	2–2
5	June 14	Converge	W 102–97	Rashawn McCarthy (30)	Hill, McCarthy, Taha, Ular (5)	Baser Amer (5)	Ynares Sports Arena	3–2
6	June 21	Barangay Ginebra	L 80–81 (OT)	James Sena (18)	Troy Rosario (11)	Rashawn McCarthy (6)	Ynares Sports Arena	3–3
7	June 25	Phoenix Super LPG	W 92–90	Troy Rosario (24)	Troy Rosario (8)	Baser Amer (7)	Ynares Sports Arena	4–3

July: 3–1

Game	Date	Opponent	Score	High points	High rebounds	High assists	Location Attendance	Record
8	July 2	San Miguel	W 103–101	Troy Rosario (19)	Ato Ular (6)	Rosario, Sena, Suerte, Ular (4)	Filoil EcoOil Centre	5–3
9	July 14	Meralco	W 89–82	Troy Rosario (21)	Ato Ular (14)	Amer, Ayonayon, Banal (3)	Ynares Sports Arena	6–3
10	July 23	Rain or Shine	L 108–131	RK Ilagan (18)	Ato Ular (11)	Rey Suerte (5)	Filoil EcoOil Centre	6–4
11	July 30	TNT	W 101–78	JVee Casio (18)	Rey Suerte (10)	Rashawn McCarthy (5)	Ynares Sports Arena	7–4

=== Converge Pocket Tournament ===
==== Game log ====
2023 PBA Converge Pocket Tournament game log
Total: 2–1
October: 2–1

Game	Date	Opponent	Score	High points	High rebounds	High assists	Location Attendance	Record
1	October 13	Converge	L 75–87	Chris Ortiz (22)	Chris Ortiz (8)	Banal, Ilagan, McCarthy (3)	Gatorade Hoops Center	0–1
2	October 15	Phoenix Super LPG	W 103–96	Chris Ortiz (28)	Chris Ortiz (14)	JVee Casio (7)	Gatorade Hoops Center	1–1
3	October 17	Rain or Shine	W 102–87	Chris Ortiz (21)	Chris Ortiz (8)	Gab Banal (6)	Gatorade Hoops Center	2–1

== Commissioner's Cup ==
=== Eliminations ===
==== Standings ====
Pos	Team	W	L	PCT	GB	Qualification
1	Magnolia Chicken Timplados Hotshots	9	2	.818	—	Twice-to-beat in quarterfinals
2	San Miguel Beermen	8	3	.727 (Note: Head-to-head quotient: San Miguel 1.17, Barangay Ginebra 0.99, Phoenix Super LPG 0.98, Meralco 0.89)	1	Twice-to-beat in quarterfinals
3	Barangay Ginebra San Miguel	8	3	.727	1	Twice-to-beat in quarterfinals
4	Phoenix Super LPG Fuel Masters	8	3	.727	1	Twice-to-beat in quarterfinals
5	Meralco Bolts	8	3	.727	1	Twice-to-win in quarterfinals
6	NorthPort Batang Pier	6	5	.545 (Note: Head-to-head record: NorthPort 1–0 Rain or Shine)	3	Twice-to-win in quarterfinals
7	Rain or Shine Elasto Painters	6	5	.545	3	Twice-to-win in quarterfinals
8	TNT Tropang Giga	5	6	.455	4	Twice-to-win in quarterfinals
9	NLEX Road Warriors	4	7	.364	5	
10	Terrafirma Dyip	2	9	.182	7	
11	Blackwater Bossing	1	10	.091 (Note: Head-to-head record: Blackwater 1–0 Converge)	8	
12	Converge FiberXers	1	10	.091	8	

Source: PBA.ph
Rules for classification: 1) winning percentage; 2) if two teams are tied, head-to-head record; if three or more teams are tied, head-to-head goal average (quotient); if tied for 8th, one-game playoff; 3) overall quotient; 4) coin toss

==== Game log ====
2023–24 PBA Commissioner's Cup game log
Total: 1–10
November: 1–4

Game	Date	Opponent	Score	High points	High rebounds	High assists	Location Attendance	Record
1	November 8	Converge	W 103–84	Chris Ortiz (21)	Chris Ortiz (11)	Chris Ortiz (6)	PhilSports Arena	1–0
2	November 11	Meralco	L 84–91	Chris Ortiz (29)	Troy Rosario (8)	JVee Casio (5)	Ynares Center	1–1
3	November 15	Terrafirma	L 87–97	Mike Ayonayon (16)	Chris Ortiz (11)	Chris Ortiz (6)	Ynares Center	1–2
4	November 24	Phoenix Super LPG	L 106–111	Chris Ortiz (35)	Chris Ortiz (13)	Chris Ortiz (7)	Smart Araneta Coliseum	1–3
5	November 26	Barangay Ginebra	L 87–90	Chris Ortiz (20)	Chris Ortiz (10)	Troy Rosario (7)	PhilSports Arena	1–4

December: 0–4

Game	Date	Opponent	Score	High points	High rebounds	High assists	Location Attendance	Record
6	December 2	Rain or Shine	L 110–115	Chris Ortiz (46)	Chris Ortiz (9)	Mike Ayonayon (6)	PhilSports Arena	1–5
7	December 6	Magnolia	L 84–105	Ayonayon, David (15)	Hill, Ilagan (6)	Chris Ortiz (8)	PhilSports Arena	1–6
8	December 15	TNT	L 96–105	Chris Ortiz (25)	Chris Ortiz (20)	Ortiz, Rosario (4)	Smart Araneta Coliseum	1–7
9	December 22	NLEX	L 97–104	Chris Ortiz (27)	Troy Rosario (8)	Chris Ortiz (7)	Smart Araneta Coliseum	1–8

January: 0–2

Game	Date	Opponent	Score	High points	High rebounds	High assists	Location Attendance	Record
10	January 5	NorthPort	L 89–106	Rey Suerte (20)	Chris Ortiz (13)	Banal, Ilagan, Kwekuteye (3)	Smart Araneta Coliseum	1–9
11	January 12	San Miguel	L 117–125	Chris Ortiz (43)	Chris Ortiz (15)	Kwekuteye, Ortiz, Suerte (5)	Smart Araneta Coliseum	1–10

== Philippine Cup ==
=== Eliminations ===
==== Standings ====
Pos	Team	W	L	PCT	GB	Qualification
1	San Miguel Beermen	10	1	.909	—	Twice-to-beat in the quarterfinals
2	Barangay Ginebra San Miguel	7	4	.636	3	Twice-to-beat in the quarterfinals
3	Meralco Bolts	6	5	.545 (Note: Head-to-head quotient: Meralco 1.06, TNT 1.03, Rain or Shine 1.01, NLEX 0.99, Magnolia 0.90)	4	Best-of-three quarterfinals
4	TNT Tropang Giga	6	5	.545	4	Best-of-three quarterfinals
5	Rain or Shine Elasto Painters	6	5	.545	4	Best-of-three quarterfinals
6	NLEX Road Warriors	6	5	.545	4	Best-of-three quarterfinals
7	Magnolia Chicken Timplados Hotshots	6	5	.545	4	Twice-to-win in the quarterfinals
8	Terrafirma Dyip	5	6	.455 (Note: Eighth seed playoff: Terrafirma 104–96 NorthPort)	5	Twice-to-win in the quarterfinals
9	NorthPort Batang Pier	5	6	.455	5	
10	Blackwater Bossing	4	7	.364	6	
11	Phoenix Fuel Masters	3	8	.273	7	
12	Converge FiberXers	2	9	.182	8	

Source: PBA.ph
Rules for classification: 1) winning percentage; 2) if two teams are tied, head-to-head record; if three or more teams are tied, head-to-head goal average (quotient); if tied for 8th, one-game playoff; 3) overall quotient; 4) coin toss

==== Game log ====
2024 PBA Philippine Cup game log
Total: 4–7
February: 1–0

Game	Date	Opponent	Score	High points	High rebounds	High assists	Location Attendance	Record
1	February 28	Meralco	W 96–93	Rey Nambatac (27)	Guinto, Jopia (6)	Rey Nambatac (10)	Ynares Center	1–0

March: 2–2

Game	Date	Opponent	Score	High points	High rebounds	High assists	Location Attendance	Record
2	March 2	TNT	W 87–76	Troy Rosario (20)	RK Ilagan (7)	RK Ilagan (8)	Smart Araneta Coliseum	2–0
3	March 6	Converge	W 90–78	Christian David (16)	Troy Rosario (8)	Rey Nambatac (8)	Smart Araneta Coliseum	3–0
4	March 13	NLEX	L 97–103	Rey Suerte (21)	Bradwyn Guinto (9)	Rey Suerte (4)	PhilSports Arena	3–1
5	March 16	Terrafirma	L 91–92	Troy Rosario (23)	Troy Rosario (8)	Ilagan, Suerte (5)	Rizal Memorial Coliseum	3–2
All-Star Break

April: 0–4

Game	Date	Opponent	Score	High points	High rebounds	High assists	Location Attendance	Record
6	April 6	Rain or Shine	L 103–110	Rey Suerte (20)	Troy Rosario (8)	Guinto, Ilagan, Tungcab (3)	Ninoy Aquino Stadium	3–3
7	April 12	Barangay Ginebra	L 86–105	James Kwekuteye (20)	Justin Chua (10)	RK Ilagan (5)	PhilSports Arena	3–4
8	April 17	Magnolia	L 77–81	James Kwekuteye (23)	RK Ilagan (6)	Troy Rosario (6)	Ninoy Aquino Stadium	3–5
9	April 27	NorthPort	L 113–115	Troy Rosario (33)	Christian David (15)	Rey Nambatac (7)	Caloocan Sports Complex	3–6

May: 1–1

Game	Date	Opponent	Score	High points	High rebounds	High assists	Location Attendance	Record
10	May 1	San Miguel	L 109–124	Kwekuteye, Rosario, Tungcab (15)	Christian David (13)	Rey Nambatac (5)	Ninoy Aquino Stadium	3–7
11	May 4	Phoenix	W 102–83	Jaydee Tungcab (19)	Troy Rosario (14)	Rey Suerte (6)	Ynares Sports Arena	4–7

== Transactions ==
=== Free agency ===
==== Signings ====
Player	Date signed	Contract amount	Contract length	Former team
Bradwyn Guinto	November 4, 2023	Not disclosed	1 conference	Converge FiberXers
Baser Amer	December 31, 2023	Not disclosed	Rest of the conference	Re-signed
Rey Suerte	January 25, 2024	Not disclosed	2 years	Re-signed
James Yap	February 9, 2024	Not disclosed	1 year	Rain or Shine Elasto Painters
Richard Escoto	February 27, 2024	Not disclosed	1 year	Re-signed

==== Subtractions ====
Player	Number	Position	Reason	New team
Joshua Torralba	33	Shooting guard / Small forward	End of contract	Goyang Sono Skygunners (KBL)
Rashawn McCarthy	2, 10	Shooting guard	End of contract	
Baser Amer	14, 1, 9	Point guard	Released	NLEX Road Warriors
Gab Banal	77	Small forward	Released	Quezon Huskers (MPBL)

=== Trades ===
==== Mid-season ====
February
February 14, 2024	To Blackwater Rey Nambatac	To Rain or Shine 2023 TNT first-round pick 2024 TNT second-round pick
February 26, 2024
February 26, 2024	To Blackwater Justin Chua; Jaydee Tungcab; 2025 TNT first-round pick	To NLEX Yousef Taha; Ato Ular; 2025 Blackwater first-round pick	To TNT Brandon Ganuelas-Rosser

=== Recruited imports ===
Tournament	Name	Debuted	Last game	Record
Commissioner's Cup	Chris Ortiz	November 8, 2023 (vs. Converge)	January 12, 2024 (vs. San Miguel)	1–10
