= 2023–24 NLEX Road Warriors season =

- Head coach: Frankie Lim
- General Manager: Larry Fonacier; Magnum Membrere (assistant)
- Owner(s): Metro Pacific Investments Corporation (an MVP Group subsidiary)

Commissioner's Cup results
- Record: 4–7 (36.4%)
- Place: 9th
- Playoff finish: Did not qualify

Philippine Cup results
- Record: 6–5 (54.5%)
- Place: 6th
- Playoff finish: Quarterfinalist (lost to Meralco, 0–2)

NLEX Road Warriors seasons

The 2023–24 NLEX Road Warriors season was the 9th season of the franchise in the Philippine Basketball Association (PBA).

== Key dates ==
- September 17: The PBA season 48 draft was held at the Market! Market! in Taguig.
- March 13, 2024: Lead assistant Jong Uichico was assigned to be the stand-in head coach, when Frankie Lim suffered hand injury. But later Lim returned on next game to coach.
- June 7: After the team's being eliminated by sister team Meralco Bolts, Uichico became full-time head coach.

== Draft picks ==
| Round | Pick | Player | Position | Place of birth | College |
|---|---|---|---|---|---|
| 1 | 7 | Richie Rodger | G | New Zealand | UE |
| 2 | 18 | Enoch Valdez | F | Philippines | Lyceum |
| 2 | 21 | Jhan Nermal | F | Philippines | West Negros |
| 3 | 30 | Dominick Fajardo | F | Philippines | Bulacan State |
| 4 | 41 | Francis Giussani | G/F | Qatar | Enderun |
| 5 | 52 | Lorenzo Navarro | G | Philippines | Lyceum |

== Roster ==
2023–24 NLEX Road Warriors roster
Players
Coaches

| Pos. | # | POB | Name | Height | Weight | DOB (YYYY–MM–DD) | From |
|---|---|---|---|---|---|---|---|
| G | 0 | (Philippines) | Edgar Charcos (R / FA) | 5 ft 8 in (1.73 m) | | | UPHSD |
| G/F | 1 | (New Zealand) | Richie Rodger (R) | 6 ft 2 in (1.88 m) | 211 lb (96 kg) | 1997–01–27 | UE |
| C | 2 | (Philippines) | Michael Miranda | 6 ft 6 in (1.98 m) | 210 lb (95 kg) | 1990–12–12 | San Sebastian |
| F | 5 | (Philippines) | Ato Ular | 6 ft 4 in (1.93 m) | 196 lb (89 kg) | 1995–05–04 | Letran |
| G | 7 | (Philippines) | Kevin Alas (injured) (C) | 6 ft 0 in (1.83 m) | 175 lb (79 kg) | 1991–11–13 | Letran |
| G | 8 | (Philippines) | Robert Bolick | 6 ft 1 in (1.85 m) | 178 lb (81 kg) | 1993–09–13 | San Beda |
| F | 9 | (Philippines) | Dominick Fajardo (R) | 6 ft 0 in (1.83 m) | 220 lb (100 kg) | 1993–10–25 | Bulacan State |
| F | 10 | (Canada) | Sean Anthony | 6 ft 4 in (1.93 m) | 200 lb (91 kg) | 1986–01–26 | McGill |
| G/F | 11 | (United States) | Robbie Herndon | 6 ft 3 in (1.91 m) | 180 lb (82 kg) | 1993–07–16 | San Francisco State |
| G | 12 | (Philippines) | Matt Nieto | 6 ft 1 in (1.85 m) | 160 lb (73 kg) | 1997–05–31 | Ateneo |
| G | 14 | (Philippines) | Baser Amer | 6 ft 0 in (1.83 m) | 170 lb (77 kg) | 1992–09–29 | San Beda |
| F | 15 | (Philippines) | Jorey Napoles (FA) | 6 ft 4 in (1.93 m) | | 1993–11–27 | TIP |
| C | 20 | (Philippines) | Dave Marcelo | 6 ft 5 in (1.96 m) | 223 lb (101 kg) | 1989–02–22 | San Beda |
| F | 22 | (Philippines) | Jake Pascual | 6 ft 4 in (1.93 m) | 200 lb (91 kg) | 1988–11–11 | San Beda |
| F | 24 | (Philippines) | Enoch Valdez (R) | 6 ft 2 in (1.88 m) | 178 lb (81 kg) | 2000–05–26 | Lyceum |
| F | 29 | (Philippines) | Jhan Nermal (R) | 6 ft 3 in (1.91 m) | 172 lb (78 kg) | 1993–05–19 | STI WNU |
| F | 33 | (Australia) | Anthony Semerad | 6 ft 4 in (1.93 m) | 220 lb (100 kg) | 1991–04–25 | San Beda |
| C | 55 | (Kuwait) | Yousef Taha | 6 ft 8 in (2.03 m) | 231 lb (105 kg) | 1988–07–08 | Mapúa |

Head coach

- (Philippines) Frankie Lim

Assistant coach(es)

- (Philippines) Jong Uichico (1st assistant)
- (Philippines) Borgie Hermida
- (Philippines) Melo Lim
- (Philippines) Emman Monfort
- (Philippines) JB Sison
- (Philippines) Adonis Tierra

Team manager

- (Philippines) Larry Fonacier
- (Philippines) Magnum Membrere (assistant)

Legend

- (C) Team captain
- (CI) Commissioner's Cup Import
- (GI) Governors' Cup Import
- (EI) EASL Import
- (DP) Unsigned draft pick
- (FA) Free agent
- (IN) Inactive
- (S) Suspended
- (R) Rookie
- Injured

Roster

== Preseason ==
=== PBA on Tour ===
==== Game log ====
2023 PBA on Tour game log
Total: 5–6
May: 0–2

| Game | Date | Opponent | Score | High points | High rebounds | High assists | Location Attendance | Record |
|---|---|---|---|---|---|---|---|---|
| 1 | May 21 | Blackwater | L 88–93 | Sean Anthony (18) | Don Trollano (10) | Kris Rosales (4) | Caloocan Sports Complex | 0–1 |
| 2 | May 26 | Rain or Shine | L 93–117 | Bong Galanza (22) | Pascual, Trollano (11) | Hesed Gabo (4) | Ynares Sports Arena | 0–2 |

June: 2–2

| Game | Date | Opponent | Score | High points | High rebounds | High assists | Location Attendance | Record |
|---|---|---|---|---|---|---|---|---|
| 3 | June 3 | Magnolia | L 97–103 | Ben Adamos (18) | Dominick Fajardo (9) | Kris Rosales (8) | Baliwag Star Arena | 0–3 |
| 4 | June 9 | Phoenix Super LPG | W 112–95 | Ben Adamos (27) | Sean Anthony (16) | Sean Anthony (11) | Ynares Sports Arena | 1–3 |
| 5 | June 16 | Terrafirma | L 96–110 | Don Trollano (20) | Sean Anthony (11) | Fajardo, Nieto, Pascual (4) | Ynares Sports Arena | 1–4 |
| 6 | June 28 | San Miguel | W 102–94 | Dominick Fajardo (20) | Jake Pascual (8) | Matt Nieto (8) | Ynares Sports Arena | 2–4 |

July: 3–2

| Game | Date | Opponent | Score | High points | High rebounds | High assists | Location Attendance | Record |
|---|---|---|---|---|---|---|---|---|
| 7 | July 5 | NorthPort | W 95–87 | Sean Anthony (25) | Ben Adamos (9) | Don Trollano (7) | Quadricentennial Pavilion | 3–4 |
| 8 | July 12 | Meralco | L 83–96 | Don Trollano (17) | Sean Anthony (11) | Matt Nieto (9) | Ynares Sports Arena | 3–5 |
| 9 | July 21 | Converge | W 112–104 | Don Trollano (26) | Jake Pascual (13) | Anthony, Nieto (6) | Ynares Sports Arena | 4–5 |
| 10 | July 26 | TNT | W 97–84 | Anthony Semerad (23) | Jake Pascual (18) | Matt Nieto (14) | Filoil EcoOil Centre | 5–5 |
| 11 | July 30 | Barangay Ginebra | L 85–91 | Sean Anthony (26) | Jake Pascual (10) | Matt Nieto (6) | Ynares Sports Arena | 5–6 |

== Commissioner's Cup ==
=== Eliminations ===
==== Standings ====
| Pos | Team | W | L | PCT | GB | Qualification |
|---|---|---|---|---|---|---|
| 1 | Magnolia Chicken Timplados Hotshots | 9 | 2 | .818 | — | Twice-to-beat in quarterfinals |
| 2 | San Miguel Beermen | 8 | 3 | .727 (Note: Head-to-head quotient: San Miguel 1.17, Barangay Ginebra 0.99, Phoenix Super LPG 0.98, Meralco 0.89) | 1 | Twice-to-beat in quarterfinals |
| 3 | Barangay Ginebra San Miguel | 8 | 3 | .727 | 1 | Twice-to-beat in quarterfinals |
| 4 | Phoenix Super LPG Fuel Masters | 8 | 3 | .727 | 1 | Twice-to-beat in quarterfinals |
| 5 | Meralco Bolts | 8 | 3 | .727 | 1 | Twice-to-win in quarterfinals |
| 6 | NorthPort Batang Pier | 6 | 5 | .545 (Note: Head-to-head record: NorthPort 1–0 Rain or Shine) | 3 | Twice-to-win in quarterfinals |
| 7 | Rain or Shine Elasto Painters | 6 | 5 | .545 | 3 | Twice-to-win in quarterfinals |
| 8 | TNT Tropang Giga | 5 | 6 | .455 | 4 | Twice-to-win in quarterfinals |
| 9 | NLEX Road Warriors | 4 | 7 | .364 | 5 | |
| 10 | Terrafirma Dyip | 2 | 9 | .182 | 7 | |
| 11 | Blackwater Bossing | 1 | 10 | .091 (Note: Head-to-head record: Blackwater 1–0 Converge) | 8 | |
| 12 | Converge FiberXers | 1 | 10 | .091 | 8 | |

Source: PBA.ph
Rules for classification: 1) winning percentage; 2) if two teams are tied, head-to-head record; if three or more teams are tied, head-to-head goal average (quotient); if tied for 8th, one-game playoff; 3) overall quotient; 4) coin toss

==== Game log ====
2023–24 PBA Commissioner's Cup game log
Total: 4–7
November: 2–2

| Game | Date | Opponent | Score | High points | High rebounds | High assists | Location Attendance | Record |
|---|---|---|---|---|---|---|---|---|
| 1 | November 10 | Phoenix Super LPG | L 101–113 | Thomas Robinson (26) | Sean Anthony (9) | Matt Nieto (8) | Smart Araneta Coliseum | 0–1 |
| 2 | November 15 | San Miguel | W 117–113 (OT) | Thomas Robinson (42) | Thomas Robinson (20) | Thomas Robinson (5) | Ynares Center | 1–1 |
| 3 | November 18 | Terrafirma | L 112–113 | Thomas Robinson (40) | Thomas Robinson (9) | Robinson, Rosales (4) | Ynares Center | 1–2 |
| 4 | November 22 | NorthPort | W 112–104 | Thomas Robinson (30) | Thomas Robinson (18) | Kris Rosales (9) | Smart Araneta Coliseum | 2–2 |

December: 1–3

| Game | Date | Opponent | Score | High points | High rebounds | High assists | Location Attendance | Record |
|---|---|---|---|---|---|---|---|---|
| 5 | December 1 | Magnolia | L 72–99 | Stokley Chaffee Jr. (23) | Stokley Chaffee Jr. (19) | Matt Nieto (3) | PhilSports Arena | 2–3 |
| 6 | December 3 | Meralco | L 94–97 | Chaffee, Trollano (24) | Stokley Chaffee Jr. (8) | Sean Anthony (7) | PhilSports Arena | 2–4 |
| 7 | December 8 | Rain or Shine | L 101–113 | Stokley Chaffee Jr. (32) | Anthony, Chaffee (8) | Robbie Herndon (5) | PhilSports Arena | 2–5 |
| 8 | December 13 | TNT | L 97–113 | Robbie Herndon (25) | Stokley Chaffee Jr. (17) | Herndon, Nieto (5) | PhilSports Arena | 2–6 |
| 9 | December 22 | Blackwater | W 104–97 | Robert Bolick (30) | Stokley Chaffee Jr. (13) | Robert Bolick (15) | Smart Araneta Coliseum | 3–6 |

January: 1–1

| Game | Date | Opponent | Score | High points | High rebounds | High assists | Location Attendance | Record |
|---|---|---|---|---|---|---|---|---|
| 10 | January 10 | Converge | W 107–103 | DeAndre Williams-Baldwin (22) | DeAndre Williams-Baldwin (15) | Robert Bolick (11) | Smart Araneta Coliseum | 4–6 |
| 11 | January 13 | Barangay Ginebra | L 99–103 | DeAndre Williams-Baldwin (27) | DeAndre Williams-Baldwin (14) | Robert Bolick (11) | Ibalong Centrum for Recreation | 4–7 |

== Philippine Cup ==
=== Eliminations ===
==== Standings ====
| Pos | Team | W | L | PCT | GB | Qualification |
|---|---|---|---|---|---|---|
| 1 | San Miguel Beermen | 10 | 1 | .909 | — | Twice-to-beat in the quarterfinals |
| 2 | Barangay Ginebra San Miguel | 7 | 4 | .636 | 3 | Twice-to-beat in the quarterfinals |
| 3 | Meralco Bolts | 6 | 5 | .545 (Note: Head-to-head quotient: Meralco 1.06, TNT 1.03, Rain or Shine 1.01, NLEX 0.99, Magnolia 0.90) | 4 | Best-of-three quarterfinals |
| 4 | TNT Tropang Giga | 6 | 5 | .545 | 4 | Best-of-three quarterfinals |
| 5 | Rain or Shine Elasto Painters | 6 | 5 | .545 | 4 | Best-of-three quarterfinals |
| 6 | NLEX Road Warriors | 6 | 5 | .545 | 4 | Best-of-three quarterfinals |
| 7 | Magnolia Chicken Timplados Hotshots | 6 | 5 | .545 | 4 | Twice-to-win in the quarterfinals |
| 8 | Terrafirma Dyip | 5 | 6 | .455 (Note: Eighth seed playoff: Terrafirma 104–96 NorthPort) | 5 | Twice-to-win in the quarterfinals |
| 9 | NorthPort Batang Pier | 5 | 6 | .455 | 5 | |
| 10 | Blackwater Bossing | 4 | 7 | .364 | 6 | |
| 11 | Phoenix Fuel Masters | 3 | 8 | .273 | 7 | |
| 12 | Converge FiberXers | 2 | 9 | .182 | 8 | |

Source: PBA.ph
Rules for classification: 1) winning percentage; 2) if two teams are tied, head-to-head record; if three or more teams are tied, head-to-head goal average (quotient); if tied for 8th, one-game playoff; 3) overall quotient; 4) coin toss

==== Game log ====
2024 PBA Philippine Cup game log
Total: 6–5
March: 4–1

| Game | Date | Opponent | Score | High points | High rebounds | High assists | Location Attendance | Record |
|---|---|---|---|---|---|---|---|---|
| 1 | March 1 | NorthPort | W 107–100 (OT) | Robert Bolick (31) | Anthony, Valdez (9) | Matt Nieto (6) | Smart Araneta Coliseum | 1–0 |
| 2 | March 3 | Terrafirma | L 95–99 | Robert Bolick (29) | Anthony, Miranda, Valdez (6) | Robert Bolick (8) | Smart Araneta Coliseum | 1–1 |
| 3 | March 6 | Meralco | W 99–96 | Robert Bolick (26) | Robert Bolick (8) | Robert Bolick (4) | Smart Araneta Coliseum | 2–1 |
| 4 | March 9 | Converge | W 115–93 | Robert Bolick (46) | Bolick, Herndon (5) | Robert Bolick (8) | Smart Araneta Coliseum | 3–1 |
| 5 | March 13 | Blackwater | W 103–97 | Robert Bolick (21) | Robbie Herndon (10) | Robert Bolick (9) | PhilSports Arena | 4–1 |
All-Star Break

April: 1–3

| Game | Date | Opponent | Score | High points | High rebounds | High assists | Location Attendance | Record |
|---|---|---|---|---|---|---|---|---|
| 6 | April 6 | Magnolia | W 87–74 | Robert Bolick (26) | Anthony Semerad (10) | Robert Bolick (9) | Ninoy Aquino Stadium | 5–1 |
| 7 | April 13 | TNT | L 101–104 | Robbie Herndon (25) | Bolick, Nieto, Semerad (5) | Robert Bolick (7) | Candon City Sports Complex | 5–2 |
| 8 | April 20 | Phoenix | L 77–112 | Enoch Valdez (16) | Enoch Valdez (9) | Robert Bolick (7) | Ynares Sports Arena | 5–3 |
| 9 | April 28 | San Miguel | L 103–120 | Enoch Valdez (18) | Enoch Valdez (8) | Matt Nieto (7) | PhilSports Arena | 5–4 |

May: 1–1

| Game | Date | Opponent | Score | High points | High rebounds | High assists | Location Attendance | Record |
|---|---|---|---|---|---|---|---|---|
| 10 | May 3 | Rain or Shine | L 104–120 | Robert Bolick (38) | Anthony, Valdez (6) | Robert Bolick (5) | PhilSports Arena | 5–5 |
| 11 | May 5 | Barangay Ginebra | W 76–72 | Robert Bolick (25) | Dave Marcelo (9) | Robert Bolick (8) | Ninoy Aquino Stadium | 6–5 |

=== Playoffs ===
==== Bracket ====
Quarterfinals
(#1 twice-to-beat)
1 | San Miguel | 95 | 110
8 | Terrafirma | 106 | 91
(Best-of-3)
4 | TNT | 1
5 | Rain or Shine | 2
(#2 twice-to-beat)
2 | Barangay Ginebra | 99
7 | Magnolia | 77
(Best-of-3)
3 | Meralco | 2
6 | NLEX | 0

Semifinals (Best-of-7)
1 | San Miguel | 4
5 | Rain or Shine | 0
2 | Barangay Ginebra | 3
3 | Meralco | 4

Finals (Best-of-7)
1 | San Miguel | 2
3 | Meralco | 4

==== Game log ====
2024 PBA Philippine Cup playoffs game log
Total: 0–2
Quarterfinals: 0–2

| Game | Date | Opponent | Score | High points | High rebounds | High assists | Location Attendance | Series |
|---|---|---|---|---|---|---|---|---|
| 1 | May 8 | Meralco | L 93–97 | Robert Bolick (48) | Marcelo, Rodger, Semerad (5) | Robert Bolick (5) | Smart Araneta Coliseum | 0–1 |
| 2 | May 10 | Meralco | L 81–100 | Robert Bolick (18) | Fajardo, Miranda (6) | Richie Rodger (7) | Rizal Memorial Coliseum | 0–2 |

== Transactions ==
=== Free agency ===
==== Signings ====
| Player | Date signed | Contract amount | Contract length | Former team |
|---|---|---|---|---|
| Robbie Herndon | July 12, 2023 | Not disclosed | 2 years | San Miguel Beermen |
| Kevin Alas | September 14, 2023 | Not disclosed | 3 years | Re-signed |
| Dave Marcelo | October 11, 2023 | Not disclosed | Not disclosed | Rain or Shine Elasto Painters |
| Robert Bolick | December 13, 2023 | Not disclosed | 2 years | Fukushima Firebonds (B2 League) |
| Dave Marcelo | January 4, 2024 | Not disclosed | 1 year | Re-signed |
| Baser Amer | February 13, 2024 | Not disclosed | Not disclosed | Blackwater Bossing |
| Jorey Napoles | April 13, 2024 | Not disclosed | Not disclosed | Cavitex Braves (PBA 3x3) |

=== Trades ===
==== Pre-season ====
May
| May 30, 2023 | To NLEX Ben Adamos | To Phoenix Reden Celda Tzaddy Rangel |

==== Commissioner's Cup ====
December
December 11, 2023
| December 11, 2023 | To NLEX Robert Bolick; Kent Salado | To NorthPort Ben Adamos; Allyn Bulanadi; Jeepy Faundo; Kris Rosales; 2023 Blackwater second-round pick (from NLEX); 2025 San Miguel second-round pick | To San Miguel Don Trollano |

==== Mid-season ====
February
February 26, 2024
| February 26, 2024 | To NLEX Yousef Taha; Ato Ular; 2025 Blackwater first-round pick | To Blackwater Justin Chua; Jaydee Tungcab; 2025 TNT first-round pick | To TNT Brandon Ganuelas-Rosser |

=== Recruited imports ===
| Tournament | Name | Debuted | Last game | Record |
|---|---|---|---|---|
| Commissioner's Cup | Thomas Robinson | November 10, 2023 (vs. Phoenix Super LPG) | November 22, 2023 (vs. NorthPort) | 2–2 |
| Commissioner's Cup | Stokley Chaffee Jr. | December 1, 2023 (vs. Magnolia) | December 22, 2023 (vs. Blackwater) | 1–4 |
| Commissioner's Cup | DeAndre Williams-Baldwin | January 10, 2024 (vs. Converge) | January 13, 2024 (vs. Barangay Ginebra) | 1–1 |
