= 2023–24 NorthPort Batang Pier season =

- Head coach: Bonnie Tan
- General Manager: Pido Jarencio
- Owner(s): Sultan 900 Capital, Inc.

Commissioner's Cup results
- Record: 6–5 (54.5%)
- Place: 6th
- Playoff finish: Quarterfinalist (lost to Barangay Ginebra with twice-to-win disadvantage)

Philippine Cup results
- Record: 5–6 (45.5%)
- Place: 9th
- Playoff finish: Did not qualify

NorthPort Batang Pier seasons

The 2023–24 NorthPort Batang Pier season was the 11th season of the franchise in the Philippine Basketball Association (PBA).

== Key dates ==
- September 17: The PBA season 48 draft was held at the Market! Market! in Taguig.

== Draft picks ==
Round	Pick	Player	Position	Place of birth	College
1	5	Zavier Lucero	F	USA	UP
1	11	Cade Flores	F	Australia	Arellano
3	29	Brent Paraiso	G	Philippines	Letran
4	40	Fran Yu	G	Philippines	Letran
5	51	John Amores	G	Philippines	JRU
6	60	Jan Sobrevega	G	Philippines	UE
7	67	Ian Herrera	C	Philippines	UST
8	71	Johnnel Bauzon	C/F	Philippines	Diliman
9	74	Joemari Lacastesantos	G	Philippines	Lyceum
10	77	Nikko Paranada	G	USA	UE
11	79	Regie Boy Basibas	F	Philippines	UST

== Roster ==
2023–24 NorthPort Batang Pier roster
Players
Coaches

Pos.	#	POB	Name	Height	Weight	DOB (YYYY–MM–DD)	From
G/F	0	(Philippines)	Paolo Taha	6 ft 0 in (1.83 m)	180 lb (82 kg)	1990–12–05	St. Benilde
C	2	(Philippines)	JM Calma	6 ft 6 in (1.98 m)	193 lb (88 kg)	1997–12–02	San Sebastian
G	3	(Philippines)	Fran Yu (R)	5 ft 9 in (1.75 m)	154 lb (70 kg)	1998–06–16	Letran
F	7	(United States)	Zavier Lucero (R)	6 ft 6 in (1.98 m)	205 lb (93 kg)	1999–04–05	Philippines
G	8	(Philippines)	Paul Zamar	5 ft 10 in (1.78 m)	179 lb (81 kg)	1987–10–20	UE
F	10	(Philippines)	Arvin Tolentino	6 ft 5 in (1.96 m)	210 lb (95 kg)	1995–11–05	Far Eastern
G	11	(United States)	Kris Rosales	6 ft 0 in (1.83 m)	165 lb (75 kg)	1990–12–20	Hope International
G	13	(Philippines)	Allyn Bulanadi	6 ft 0 in (1.83 m)		1997–04–28	San Sebastian
G/F	16	(Philippines)	Jeff Chan	6 ft 2 in (1.88 m)	185 lb (84 kg)	1983–02–11	Far Eastern
G	19	(Philippines)	John Amores (R)	6 ft 2 in (1.88 m)	178 lb (81 kg)	1999–06–13	José Rizal
F	22	(Australia)	Cade Flores (R)	6 ft 5 in (1.96 m)	214 lb (97 kg)		Arellano
F	23	(Greece)	William Navarro	6 ft 6 in (1.98 m)	185 lb (84 kg)	1997–02–03	Ateneo
G/F	24	(United States)	Joshua Munzon	6 ft 4 in (1.93 m)	200 lb (91 kg)	1995–01–15	Cal State LA
F/C	37	(Philippines)	Damie Cuntapay (R)	6 ft 5 in (1.96 m)		1998–10–22	San Beda
G	38	(Philippines)	Brent Paraiso (R)	6 ft 1 in (1.85 m)	190 lb (86 kg)		Letran
F/C	88	(Philippines)	Ben Adamos	6 ft 7 in (2.01 m)	200 lb (91 kg)	1995–12–30	UPHSD

Head coach

- (Philippines) Bonnie Tan

Assistant coach(es)

- (Philippines) Rensy Bajar (1st assistant)
- (Philippines) Alfredo Jarencio II
- (Philippines) Jeff Napa
- (Philippines) Michael Oliver

Team manager

- (Philippines) Pido Jarencio
- (Philippines) Waiyip Chong (assistant)

Legend

- (C) Team captain
- (CI) Commissioner's Cup Import
- (GI) Governors' Cup Import
- (EI) EASL Import
- (DP) Unsigned draft pick
- (FA) Free agent
- (IN) Inactive
- (S) Suspended
- (R) Rookie
- Injured

Roster

== Preseason ==
=== PBA on Tour ===
==== Game log ====
2023 PBA on Tour game log
Total: 5–6
May: 0–2

Game	Date	Opponent	Score	High points	High rebounds	High assists	Location Attendance	Record
1	May 24	Meralco	L 89–97	Jeff Chan (20)	JM Calma (11)	Joshua Munzon (4)	Ynares Sports Arena	0–1
2	May 27	San Miguel	L 75–87	Paul Zamar (20)	JM Calma (13)	Jeff Chan (7)	Caloocan Sports Complex	0–2

June: 3–1

Game	Date	Opponent	Score	High points	High rebounds	High assists	Location Attendance	Record
3	June 2	TNT	W 99–90	Joshua Munzon (16)	Arwind Santos (9)	Fran Yu (4)	Ynares Center	1–2
4	June 9	Blackwater	W 112–95	Arvin Tolentino (22)	Arwind Santos (9)	Munzon, Salado (4)	Ynares Sports Arena	2–2
5	June 17	Barangay Ginebra	W 101–95	Fran Yu (21)	Munzon, Tolentino (9)	Joshua Munzon (10)	Batangas City Coliseum	3–2
6	June 23	Magnolia	L 89–125	Arvin Tolentino (19)	JM Calma (10)	Munzon, Salado (6)	Ynares Sports Arena	3–3

July: 2–3

Game	Date	Opponent	Score	High points	High rebounds	High assists	Location Attendance	Record
7	July 5	NLEX	L 87–95	Paul Zamar (22)	Munzon, Zamar (9)	Joshua Munzon (8)	Quadricentennial Pavilion	3–4
8	July 9	Terrafirma	W 104–100	Arvin Tolentino (28)	Calma, Tolentino (9)	Kent Salado (6)	Ynares Sports Arena	4–4
9	July 14	Phoenix Super LPG	W 105–86	Arvin Tolentino (41)	JM Calma (8)	Joshua Munzon (5)	Ynares Sports Arena	5–4
10	July 19	Rain or Shine	L 112–118	JM Calma (22)	JM Calma (16)	Kent Salado (7)	Ynares Sports Arena	5–5
11	July 28	Converge	L 84–113	MJ Ayaay (19)	JM Calma (10)	Paul Zamar (5)	Ynares Sports Arena	5–6

== Commissioner's Cup ==
=== Eliminations ===
==== Standings ====
Pos	Team	W	L	PCT	GB	Qualification
1	Magnolia Chicken Timplados Hotshots	9	2	.818	—	Twice-to-beat in quarterfinals
2	San Miguel Beermen	8	3	.727 (Note: Head-to-head quotient: San Miguel 1.17, Barangay Ginebra 0.99, Phoenix Super LPG 0.98, Meralco 0.89)	1	Twice-to-beat in quarterfinals
3	Barangay Ginebra San Miguel	8	3	.727	1	Twice-to-beat in quarterfinals
4	Phoenix Super LPG Fuel Masters	8	3	.727	1	Twice-to-beat in quarterfinals
5	Meralco Bolts	8	3	.727	1	Twice-to-win in quarterfinals
6	NorthPort Batang Pier	6	5	.545 (Note: Head-to-head record: NorthPort 1–0 Rain or Shine)	3	Twice-to-win in quarterfinals
7	Rain or Shine Elasto Painters	6	5	.545	3	Twice-to-win in quarterfinals
8	TNT Tropang Giga	5	6	.455	4	Twice-to-win in quarterfinals
9	NLEX Road Warriors	4	7	.364	5	
10	Terrafirma Dyip	2	9	.182	7	
11	Blackwater Bossing	1	10	.091 (Note: Head-to-head record: Blackwater 1–0 Converge)	8	
12	Converge FiberXers	1	10	.091	8	

Source: PBA.ph
Rules for classification: 1) winning percentage; 2) if two teams are tied, head-to-head record; if three or more teams are tied, head-to-head goal average (quotient); if tied for 8th, one-game playoff; 3) overall quotient; 4) coin toss

==== Game log ====
2023–24 PBA Commissioner's Cup game log
Total: 6–5
November: 2–2

Game	Date	Opponent	Score	High points	High rebounds	High assists	Location Attendance	Record
1	November 10	Terrafirma	W 108–103	Venky Jois (43)	Cade Flores (12)	Brent Paraiso (7)	Smart Araneta Coliseum	1–0
2	November 12	Rain or Shine	W 113–103	Arvin Tolentino (35)	Venky Jois (21)	Venky Jois (7)	Ynares Center	2–0
3	November 17	Magnolia	L 74–112	Arvin Tolentino (22)	Venky Jois (8)	Venky Jois (3)	Smart Araneta Coliseum	2–1
4	November 22	NLEX	L 104–112	Joshua Munzon (22)	Venky Jois (19)	Kent Salado (6)	Smart Araneta Coliseum	2–2

December: 3–2

Game	Date	Opponent	Score	High points	High rebounds	High assists	Location Attendance	Record
5	December 1	TNT	W 128–123 (OT)	Arvin Tolentino (27)	Venky Jois (12)	Venky Jois (7)	PhilSports Arena	3–2
6	December 6	Converge	W 111–95	Venky Jois (39)	Venky Jois (21)	Venky Jois (6)	PhilSports Arena	4–2
7	December 8	San Miguel	W 115–101	Arvin Tolentino (28)	JM Calma (8)	Flores, Yu (5)	PhilSports Arena	5–2
8	December 10	Meralco	L 99–125	Fran Yu (31)	Calma, Jois (9)	Tolentino, Jois (5)	PhilSports Arena	5–3
9	December 20	Phoenix Super LPG	L 104–113	Venky Jois (27)	Venky Jois (15)	Venky Jois (5)	Smart Araneta Coliseum	5–4

January: 1–1

Game	Date	Opponent	Score	High points	High rebounds	High assists	Location Attendance	Record
10	January 5	Blackwater	W 106–89	Joshua Munzon (20)	Venky Jois (20)	Venky Jois (7)	Smart Araneta Coliseum	6–4
11	January 7	Barangay Ginebra	L 93–103	Arvin Tolentino (27)	Venky Jois (17)	Munzon, Yu (5)	Smart Araneta Coliseum	6–5

=== Playoffs ===
==== Bracket ====
Quarterfinals (Top 4 twice-to-beat)
1	Magnolia	109
8	TNT	94
4	Phoenix Super LPG	107	88
5	Meralco	116***	84
2	San Miguel	127
7	Rain or Shine	122
3	Barangay Ginebra	106
6	NorthPort	93

Semifinals (Best-of-5)
1	Magnolia	3
4	Phoenix Super LPG	1
2	San Miguel	3
3	Barangay Ginebra	0

Finals (Best-of-7)
1	Magnolia	2
2	San Miguel	4

***Game went into triple overtime

==== Game log ====
2023–24 PBA Commissioner's Cup playoffs game log
Total: 0–1
Quarterfinals: 0–1

Game	Date	Opponent	Score	High points	High rebounds	High assists	Location Attendance	Series
1	January 19	Barangay Ginebra	L 93–106	Calma, Munzon (19)	Venky Jois (14)	Venky Jois (12)	PhilSports Arena	0–1

== Philippine Cup ==
=== Eliminations ===
==== Standings ====
Pos	Team	W	L	PCT	GB	Qualification
1	San Miguel Beermen	10	1	.909	—	Twice-to-beat in the quarterfinals
2	Barangay Ginebra San Miguel	7	4	.636	3	Twice-to-beat in the quarterfinals
3	Meralco Bolts	6	5	.545 (Note: Head-to-head quotient: Meralco 1.06, TNT 1.03, Rain or Shine 1.01, NLEX 0.99, Magnolia 0.90)	4	Best-of-three quarterfinals
4	TNT Tropang Giga	6	5	.545	4	Best-of-three quarterfinals
5	Rain or Shine Elasto Painters	6	5	.545	4	Best-of-three quarterfinals
6	NLEX Road Warriors	6	5	.545	4	Best-of-three quarterfinals
7	Magnolia Chicken Timplados Hotshots	6	5	.545	4	Twice-to-win in the quarterfinals
8	Terrafirma Dyip	5	6	.455 (Note: Eighth seed playoff: Terrafirma 104–96 NorthPort)	5	Twice-to-win in the quarterfinals
9	NorthPort Batang Pier	5	6	.455	5	
10	Blackwater Bossing	4	7	.364	6	
11	Phoenix Fuel Masters	3	8	.273	7	
12	Converge FiberXers	2	9	.182	8	

Source: PBA.ph
Rules for classification: 1) winning percentage; 2) if two teams are tied, head-to-head record; if three or more teams are tied, head-to-head goal average (quotient); if tied for 8th, one-game playoff; 3) overall quotient; 4) coin toss

==== Game log ====
2024 PBA Philippine Cup game log
Total: 5–6
March: 3–1

Game	Date	Opponent	Score	High points	High rebounds	High assists	Location Attendance	Record
1	March 1	NLEX	L 100–107 (OT)	Arvin Tolentino (29)	William Navarro (13)	Paul Zamar (3)	Smart Araneta Coliseum	0–1
2	March 3	Converge	W 112–104 (OT)	Arvin Tolentino (31)	Cade Flores (14)	Arvin Tolentino (11)	Smart Araneta Coliseum	1–1
3	March 8	Phoenix	W 124–120	Cade Flores (21)	Cade Flores (12)	Fran Yu (6)	Smart Araneta Coliseum	2–1
4	March 10	Meralco	W 90–85	Calma, Tolentino (16)	JM Calma (8)	Fran Yu (6)	Smart Araneta Coliseum	3–1
All-Star Break

April: 2–5

Game	Date	Opponent	Score	High points	High rebounds	High assists	Location Attendance	Record
5	April 5	TNT	W 112–96	Arvin Tolentino (29)	JM Calma (13)	Arvin Tolentino (5)	Smart Araneta Coliseum	4–1
6	April 10	Magnolia	L 97–104	Zavier Lucero (18)	Lucero, Navarro (7)	Joshua Munzon (8)	Ninoy Aquino Stadium	4–2
7	April 14	Barangay Ginebra	L 88–95	Arvin Tolentino (19)	Arvin Tolentino (9)	Flores, Lucero, Munzon, Navarro, Tolentino, Yu (2)	Ninoy Aquino Stadium	4–3
8	April 17	Rain or Shine	L 105–115	Zavier Lucero (29)	Cade Flores (12)	Fran Yu (4)	Ninoy Aquino Stadium	4–4
9	April 21	San Miguel	L 100–120	Arvin Tolentino (26)	Arvin Tolentino (9)	Munzon, Yu (5)	PhilSports Arena	4–5
10	April 24	Terrafirma	L 108–110	Arvin Tolentino (25)	Arvin Tolentino (7)	Paul Zamar (4)	Ninoy Aquino Stadium	4–6
11	April 27	Blackwater	W 115–113	Arvin Tolentino (27)	Arvin Tolentino (11)	Arvin Tolentino (7)	Caloocan Sports Complex	5–6

=== Playoffs ===
==== Bracket ====
Quarterfinals
(#1 twice-to-beat)
1	San Miguel	95	110
8	Terrafirma	106	91
(Best-of-3)
4	TNT	1
5	Rain or Shine	2
(#2 twice-to-beat)
2	Barangay Ginebra	99
7	Magnolia	77
(Best-of-3)
3	Meralco	2
6	NLEX	0

Semifinals (Best-of-7)
1	San Miguel	4
5	Rain or Shine	0
2	Barangay Ginebra	3
3	Meralco	4

Finals (Best-of-7)
1	San Miguel	2
3	Meralco	4

==== Game log ====
2024 PBA Philippine Cup playoffs game log
Total: 0–1
8th seed playoff: 0–1

Game	Date	Opponent	Score	High points	High rebounds	High assists	Location Attendance	Series
1	May 8	Terrafirma	L 96–104	Zavier Lucero (17)	Arvin Tolentino (8)	Munzon, Tolentino (4)	Ninoy Aquino Stadium	0–1

== Transactions ==
=== Free agency ===
==== Signings ====
Player	Date signed	Contract amount	Contract length	Former team
William Navarro	July 6, 2023	Not disclosed	2 years	Re-signed

==== Subtractions ====
Player	Number	Position	Reason	New team
Robert Bolick	8	Point guard / Shooting guard	End of contract	Fukushima Firebonds (B.League)
Roi Sumang	6	Point guard	End of contract	Nueva Ecija Rice Vanguards (MPBL)
Arwind Santos	29	Power forward	End of contract	Pampanga Giant Lanterns (MPBL)

=== Trades ===
==== Commissioner's Cup ====
December
December 11, 2023
December 11, 2023	To NorthPort Ben Adamos; Allyn Bulanadi; Jeepy Faundo; Kris Rosales; 2023 Blackwater second-round pick (from NLEX); 2025 San Miguel second-round pick	To NLEX Robert Bolick; Kent Salado	To San Miguel Don Trollano

=== Recruited imports ===
Tournament	Name	Debuted	Last game	Record
Commissioner's Cup	Venky Jois	November 10, 2023 (vs. Terrafirma)	January 19, 2024 (vs. Barangay Ginebra)	5–6

== Awards ==
Recipient	Honors	Date awarded
Arvin Tolentino	2023–24 PBA Mythical First Team	August 18, 2024
Joshua Munzon	2023–24 PBA All-Defensive Team	August 18, 2024
Paul Zamar	2023–24 PBA Sportsmanship award	August 18, 2024
