= 2023–24 Barangay Ginebra San Miguel season =

- Head coach: Tim Cone
- General Manager: Alfrancis Chua; Raymond Rodriguez (assistant)
- Owner(s): Ginebra San Miguel, Inc. (a San Miguel Corporation subsidiary)

Commissioner's Cup results
- Record: 8–3 (72.7%)
- Place: 3rd
- Playoff finish: Semifinalist (lost to San Miguel, 0–3)

Philippine Cup results
- Record: 7–4 (63.6%)
- Place: 2nd
- Playoff finish: Semifinalist (lost to Meralco, 3–4)

Barangay Ginebra San Miguel seasons

The 2023–24 Barangay Ginebra San Miguel season was the 44th season of the franchise in the Philippine Basketball Association (PBA).

== Key dates ==
- September 17: The PBA season 48 draft was held at the Market! Market! in Taguig.

== Draft picks ==
Round	Pick	Player	Position	Place of birth	College
2	23	Ralph Cu	F	Philippines	De La Salle
3	34	Kim Aurin	G/F	Philippines	Perpetual
4	45	Franz Abuda	F	Philippines	San Beda
5	56	Brandrey Bienes	C/F	Philippines	FEU

== Roster ==
2023–24 Barangay Ginebra San Miguel roster
Players
Coaches

Pos.	#	POB	Name	Height	Weight	DOB (YYYY–MM–DD)	From
G/F	0	(United States)	Jeremiah Gray (injured)	6 ft 5 in (1.96 m)	205 lb (93 kg)	1996–08–16	Dominican (CA)
G	00	(United States)	Maverick Ahanmisi	6 ft 2 in (1.88 m)	190 lb (86 kg)	1991–07–17	Minnesota
F	2	(United States)	Jared Dillinger	6 ft 4 in (1.93 m)	220 lb (100 kg)	1984–01–06	Hawaiʻi
F	3	(United States)	Jamie Malonzo (injured)	6 ft 6 in (1.98 m)	210 lb (95 kg)	1996–07–31	De La Salle
F	4	(United States)	David Murrell	6 ft 4 in (1.93 m)	195 lb (88 kg)	1996–11–08	UP Diliman
G	5	(Philippines)	LA Tenorio (C)	5 ft 9 in (1.75 m)	151 lb (68 kg)	1984–07–09	Ateneo
G	9	(Philippines)	Scottie Thompson	6 ft 1 in (1.85 m)	180 lb (82 kg)	1993–07–12	UPHSD
G	10	(Philippines)	John Pinto	5 ft 11 in (1.80 m)	170 lb (77 kg)	1990–10–15	Arellano
G	11	(United States)	Stanley Pringle	6 ft 1 in (1.85 m)	190 lb (86 kg)	1987–03–05	Penn State
F	18	(Philippines)	Ralph Cu (R)	6 ft 4 in (1.93 m)	210 lb (95 kg)	1997–03–08	De La Salle
G/F	19	(Philippines)	Von Pessumal	6 ft 2 in (1.88 m)	185 lb (84 kg)	1993–02–12	Ateneo
G	20	(Philippines)	Donald Gumaru (R)	5 ft 11 in (1.80 m)	160 lb (73 kg)	1992–09–20	Arellano
F/C	23	(Philippines)	Raymond Aguilar	6 ft 4 in (1.93 m)	200 lb (91 kg)	1985–07–27	National-U
G/F	24	(Philippines)	Jayson David	6 ft 3 in (1.91 m)	191 lb (87 kg)	1996–11–08	Lyceum
C	25	(Philippines)	Japeth Aguilar	6 ft 9 in (2.06 m)	235 lb (107 kg)	1987–01–25	Western Kentucky
F	27	(Philippines)	Sidney Onwubere	6 ft 4 in (1.93 m)		1993–08–01	Emilio Aguinaldo
F	31	(Philippines)	Aljon Mariano (injured)	6 ft 3 in (1.91 m)	175 lb (79 kg)	1992–08–03	UST
F/C	34	(Germany)	Christian Standhardinger	6 ft 8 in (2.03 m)	220 lb (100 kg)	1989–07–04	Hawaiʻi
F	21	(United States)	Tony Bishop (CI)	6 ft 8 in (2.03 m)	220 lb (100 kg)	1989–07–16	Texas State

Head coach

- (United States) Tim Cone

Assistant coach(es)

- (Philippines) Richard del Rosario (1st assistant)
- (United States) Kirk Collier
- (Philippines) Jamil Lipae
- (Philippines) Patrick Partosa
- (Philippines) Olsen Racela

Team manager

- (Philippines) Alfrancis Chua^{[a]}
- (Philippines) Raymond Rodriguez (assistant)

Legend

- (C) Team captain
- (CI) Commissioner's Cup Import
- (GI) Governors' Cup Import
- (EI) EASL Import
- (DP) Unsigned draft pick
- (FA) Free agent
- (IN) Inactive
- (S) Suspended
- (R) Rookie
- Injured

Roster

- ^{a} Also serves as Barangay Ginebra's board governor.

== Preseason ==
=== PBA on Tour ===
==== Game log ====
2023 PBA on Tour game log
Total: 6–5
June: 4–3

Game	Date	Opponent	Score	High points	High rebounds	High assists	Location Attendance	Record
1	June 4	San Miguel	L 78–90	Kim Aurin (18)	Raymond Aguilar (9)	John Pinto (8)	Ynares Center	0–1
2	June 11	Magnolia	L 80–91	Raymond Aguilar (22)	Jeremiah Gray (8)	John Pinto (5)	Ynares Center	0–2
3	June 14	Phoenix Super LPG	W 95–89	John Pinto (22)	Aljon Mariano (10)	John Pinto (7)	Ynares Sports Arena	1–2
4	June 17	NorthPort	L 95–101	Jeremiah Gray (26)	Jeremiah Gray (11)	Jayson David (5)	Batangas City Coliseum	1–3
5	June 21	Blackwater	W 81–80 (OT)	Sidney Onwubere (25)	Sidney Onwubere (11)	Gray, Pinto (5)	Ynares Sports Arena	2–3
6	June 25	Rain or Shine	W 108–107	Von Pessumal (29)	Jeremiah Gray (13)	Gray, Pinto (8)	Ynares Sports Arena	3–3
7	June 30	Terrafirma	W 114–106	Aljon Mariano (25)	Aljon Mariano (11)	Jeremiah Gray (6)	Ynares Sports Arena	4–3

July: 2–2

Game	Date	Opponent	Score	High points	High rebounds	High assists	Location Attendance	Record
8	July 5	Meralco	L 93–106	Von Pessumal (26)	Jeremiah Gray (10)	Jeremiah Gray (5)	Quadricentennial Pavilion	4–4
9	July 16	Converge	L 95–123	Onwubere, Pinto (19)	Jayson David (9)	David, Gray (7)	Filoil EcoOil Centre	4–5
10	July 21	TNT	W 81–67	Sidney Onwubere (21)	Sidney Onwubere (16)	Jayson David (5)	Ynares Sports Arena	5–5
11	July 30	NLEX	W 91–85	Von Pessumal (23)	Jayson David (13)	Ralph Cu (9)	Ynares Sports Arena	6–5

== Commissioner's Cup ==
=== Eliminations ===
==== Standings ====
Pos	Team	W	L	PCT	GB	Qualification
1	Magnolia Chicken Timplados Hotshots	9	2	.818	—	Twice-to-beat in quarterfinals
2	San Miguel Beermen	8	3	.727 (Note: Head-to-head quotient: San Miguel 1.17, Barangay Ginebra 0.99, Phoenix Super LPG 0.98, Meralco 0.89)	1	Twice-to-beat in quarterfinals
3	Barangay Ginebra San Miguel	8	3	.727	1	Twice-to-beat in quarterfinals
4	Phoenix Super LPG Fuel Masters	8	3	.727	1	Twice-to-beat in quarterfinals
5	Meralco Bolts	8	3	.727	1	Twice-to-win in quarterfinals
6	NorthPort Batang Pier	6	5	.545 (Note: Head-to-head record: NorthPort 1–0 Rain or Shine)	3	Twice-to-win in quarterfinals
7	Rain or Shine Elasto Painters	6	5	.545	3	Twice-to-win in quarterfinals
8	TNT Tropang Giga	5	6	.455	4	Twice-to-win in quarterfinals
9	NLEX Road Warriors	4	7	.364	5	
10	Terrafirma Dyip	2	9	.182	7	
11	Blackwater Bossing	1	10	.091 (Note: Head-to-head record: Blackwater 1–0 Converge)	8	
12	Converge FiberXers	1	10	.091	8	

Source: PBA.ph
Rules for classification: 1) winning percentage; 2) if two teams are tied, head-to-head record; if three or more teams are tied, head-to-head goal average (quotient); if tied for 8th, one-game playoff; 3) overall quotient; 4) coin toss

==== Game log ====
2023–24 PBA Commissioner's Cup game log
Total: 8–3
November: 3–1

Game	Date	Opponent	Score	High points	High rebounds	High assists	Location Attendance	Record
1	November 17	Converge	W 100–86	Tony Bishop (34)	Christian Standhardinger (16)	Scottie Thompson (6)	Smart Araneta Coliseum	1–0
2	November 19	Magnolia	L 91–93	Ahanmisi, Bishop (21)	Maverick Ahanmisi (13)	Scottie Thompson (9)	Smart Araneta Coliseum	1–1
3	November 24	Rain or Shine	W 107–102	Tony Bishop (25)	Ahanmisi, Bishop (12)	Maverick Ahanmisi (9)	Smart Araneta Coliseum	2–1
4	November 26	Blackwater	W 90–87	Tony Bishop (25)	Christian Standhardinger (12)	Standhardinger, Thompson (6)	PhilSports Arena	3–1

December: 3–2

Game	Date	Opponent	Score	High points	High rebounds	High assists	Location Attendance	Record
5	December 3	Terrafirma	W 110–99	Tony Bishop (26)	Tony Bishop (11)	Ahanmisi, Bishop, Malonzo, Standhardinger (4)	PhilSports Arena	4–1
6	December 9	Phoenix Super LPG	L 77–82	Tony Bishop (21)	Tony Bishop (15)	Tony Bishop (6)	FPJ Arena	4–2
7	December 15	San Miguel	L 82–95	Tony Bishop (20)	Tony Bishop (9)	Stanley Pringle (5)	Smart Araneta Coliseum	4–3
8	December 22	Meralco	W 110–96	Maverick Ahanmisi (25)	Tony Bishop (13)	Standhardinger, Thompson (7)	Smart Araneta Coliseum	5–3
9	December 25	TNT	W 86–78	Christian Standhardinger (22)	Tony Bishop (12)	Scottie Thompson (7)	Smart Araneta Coliseum	6–3

January: 2–0

Game	Date	Opponent	Score	High points	High rebounds	High assists	Location Attendance	Record
10	January 7	NorthPort	W 103–93	Tony Bishop (26)	Tony Bishop (16)	Scottie Thompson (10)	Smart Araneta Coliseum	7–3
11	January 13	NLEX	W 103–99	Tony Bishop (27)	Tony Bishop (13)	Scottie Thompson (8)	Ibalong Centrum for Recreation	8–3

=== Playoffs ===
==== Bracket ====
Quarterfinals (Top 4 twice-to-beat)
1	Magnolia	109
8	TNT	94
4	Phoenix Super LPG	107	88
5	Meralco	116***	84
2	San Miguel	127
7	Rain or Shine	122
3	Barangay Ginebra	106
6	NorthPort	93

Semifinals (Best-of-5)
1	Magnolia	3
4	Phoenix Super LPG	1
2	San Miguel	3
3	Barangay Ginebra	0

Finals (Best-of-7)
1	Magnolia	2
2	San Miguel	4

***Game went into triple overtime

==== Game log ====
2023–24 PBA Commissioner's Cup playoffs game log
Total: 1–3
Quarterfinals: 1–0

Game	Date	Opponent	Score	High points	High rebounds	High assists	Location Attendance	Series
1	January 19	NorthPort	W 106–93	Tony Bishop (31)	Tony Bishop (15)	Scottie Thompson (10)	PhilSports Arena	1–0

Semifinals: 0–3

Game	Date	Opponent	Score	High points	High rebounds	High assists	Location Attendance	Series
1	January 24	San Miguel	L 90–92	Christian Standhardinger (21)	Bishop, Standhardinger (11)	Scottie Thompson (8)	Smart Araneta Coliseum	0–1
2	January 26	San Miguel	L 96–106	Jamie Malonzo (27)	Christian Standhardinger (14)	Jamie Malonzo (4)	SM Mall of Asia Arena	0–2
3	January 28	San Miguel	L 91–94	Tony Bishop (25)	Scottie Thompson (9)	Scottie Thompson (5)	SM Mall of Asia Arena; 15,126	0–3

== Philippine Cup ==
=== Eliminations ===
==== Standings ====
Pos	Team	W	L	PCT	GB	Qualification
1	San Miguel Beermen	10	1	.909	—	Twice-to-beat in the quarterfinals
2	Barangay Ginebra San Miguel	7	4	.636	3	Twice-to-beat in the quarterfinals
3	Meralco Bolts	6	5	.545 (Note: Head-to-head quotient: Meralco 1.06, TNT 1.03, Rain or Shine 1.01, NLEX 0.99, Magnolia 0.90)	4	Best-of-three quarterfinals
4	TNT Tropang Giga	6	5	.545	4	Best-of-three quarterfinals
5	Rain or Shine Elasto Painters	6	5	.545	4	Best-of-three quarterfinals
6	NLEX Road Warriors	6	5	.545	4	Best-of-three quarterfinals
7	Magnolia Chicken Timplados Hotshots	6	5	.545	4	Twice-to-win in the quarterfinals
8	Terrafirma Dyip	5	6	.455 (Note: Eighth seed playoff: Terrafirma 104–96 NorthPort)	5	Twice-to-win in the quarterfinals
9	NorthPort Batang Pier	5	6	.455	5	
10	Blackwater Bossing	4	7	.364	6	
11	Phoenix Fuel Masters	3	8	.273	7	
12	Converge FiberXers	2	9	.182	8	

Source: PBA.ph
Rules for classification: 1) winning percentage; 2) if two teams are tied, head-to-head record; if three or more teams are tied, head-to-head goal average (quotient); if tied for 8th, one-game playoff; 3) overall quotient; 4) coin toss

==== Game log ====
2024 PBA Philippine Cup game log
Total: 7–4
March: 3–1

Game	Date	Opponent	Score	High points	High rebounds	High assists	Location Attendance	Record
1	March 8	Rain or Shine	W 113–107	Jamie Malonzo (32)	Christian Standhardinger (13)	Maverick Ahanmisi (9)	Smart Araneta Coliseum	1–0
2	March 10	Phoenix	W 102–92	Jamie Malonzo (17)	Maverick Ahanmisi (11)	Maverick Ahanmisi (8)	Smart Araneta Coliseum	2–0
3	March 15	Meralco	L 73–91	Maverick Ahanmisi (14)	Jamie Malonzo (8)	Ahanmisi, David, Malonzo, Tenorio (2)	Smart Araneta Coliseum	2–1
All-Star Break
4	March 31	Magnolia	W 87–77	Stanley Pringle (17)	Christian Standhardinger (14)	Christian Standhardinger (7)	Smart Araneta Coliseum	3–1

April: 4–2

Game	Date	Opponent	Score	High points	High rebounds	High assists	Location Attendance	Record
5	April 5	San Miguel	L 92–95	Japeth Aguilar (17)	Christian Standhardinger (17)	Christian Standhardinger (6)	Smart Araneta Coliseum	3–2
6	April 7	Terrafirma	L 85–91	Christian Standhardinger (21)	Sidney Onwubere (12)	Ahanmisi, Tenorio (5)	Ninoy Aquino Stadium	3–3
7	April 12	Blackwater	W 105–86	Christian Standhardinger (33)	Japeth Aguilar (9)	Scottie Thompson (8)	PhilSports Arena	4–3
8	April 14	NorthPort	W 95–88	Christian Standhardinger (25)	Christian Standhardinger (17)	Ralph Cu (9)	Ninoy Aquino Stadium	5–3
9	April 19	TNT	W 87–83	Aguilar, Standhardinger (20)	Christian Standhardinger (15)	Scottie Thompson (6)	PhilSports Arena	6–3
10	April 27	Converge	W 105–93	Christian Standhardinger (33)	Christian Standhardinger (12)	Christian Standhardinger (9)	Aquilino Q. Pimentel Jr. International Convention Center	7–3

May: 0–1

Game	Date	Opponent	Score	High points	High rebounds	High assists	Location Attendance	Record
11	May 5	NLEX	L 72–76	Christian Standhardinger (19)	Christian Standhardinger (10)	Christian Standhardinger (7)	Ninoy Aquino Stadium	7–4

=== Playoffs ===
==== Bracket ====
Quarterfinals
(#1 twice-to-beat)
1	San Miguel	95	110
8	Terrafirma	106	91
(Best-of-3)
4	TNT	1
5	Rain or Shine	2
(#2 twice-to-beat)
2	Barangay Ginebra	99
7	Magnolia	77
(Best-of-3)
3	Meralco	2
6	NLEX	0

Semifinals (Best-of-7)
1	San Miguel	4
5	Rain or Shine	0
2	Barangay Ginebra	3
3	Meralco	4

Finals (Best-of-7)
1	San Miguel	2
3	Meralco	4

==== Game log ====
2024 PBA Philippine Cup playoffs game log
Total: 4–4
Quarterfinals: 1–0

Game	Date	Opponent	Score	High points	High rebounds	High assists	Location Attendance	Series
1	May 11	Magnolia	W 99–77	Christian Standhardinger (36)	Christian Standhardinger (11)	Scottie Thompson (10)	Rizal Memorial Coliseum	1–0

Semifinals: 3–4

Game	Date	Opponent	Score	High points	High rebounds	High assists	Location Attendance	Series
1	May 17	Meralco	W 92–88	Stanley Pringle (22)	J. Aguilar, Thompson (8)	Christian Standhardinger (7)	Mall of Asia Arena	1–0
2	May 19	Meralco	L 91–103	Christian Standhardinger (41)	Christian Standhardinger (11)	Christian Standhardinger (4)	Mall of Asia Arena	1–1
3	May 22	Meralco	L 80–87	Japeth Aguilar (15)	Christian Standhardinger (10)	Tenorio, Thompson (4)	Dasmariñas Arena	1–2
4	May 24	Meralco	W 90–71	Japeth Aguilar (21)	Christian Standhardinger (11)	Christian Standhardinger (8)	Mall of Asia Arena	2–2
5	May 26	Meralco	W 89–84	Christian Standhardinger (34)	Japeth Aguilar (12)	Christian Standhardinger (5)	Mall of Asia Arena	3–2
6	May 29	Meralco	L 81–86	Aguilar, Standhardinger (19)	Scottie Thompson (12)	Scottie Thompson (4)	Smart Araneta Coliseum	3–3
7	May 31	Meralco	L 69–78	Scottie Thompson (20)	Aguilar, Thompson (10)	Scottie Thompson (6)	FPJ Arena	3–4

== Transactions ==
=== Free agency ===
==== Signings ====
Player	Date signed	Contract amount	Contract length	Former team
Jayson David	May 12, 2023	Not disclosed	1 year	Re-signed
Maverick Ahanmisi	September 18, 2023	₱420,000 per month (max. contract)	3 years	Converge FiberXers
Jamie Malonzo	October 9, 2023	Not disclosed	2 years	Re-signed
Donald Gumaru	October 15, 2023	Not disclosed	Not disclosed	Barangay Ginebra San Miguel (PBA 3x3)
David Murrell	April 25, 2024	Not disclosed	Not disclosed	Magnolia Chicken Timplados Hotshots

=== Recruited imports ===
Tournament	Name	Debuted	Last game	Record
Commissioner's Cup	Tony Bishop	November 17, 2023 (vs. Converge)	January 28, 2024 (vs. San Miguel)	9–6

== Awards ==
Recipient	Honors	Date awarded
Christian Standhardinger	2023–24 PBA Mythical First Team	August 18, 2024
