= Justin Arana =

Filipino basketball player (born 1999)

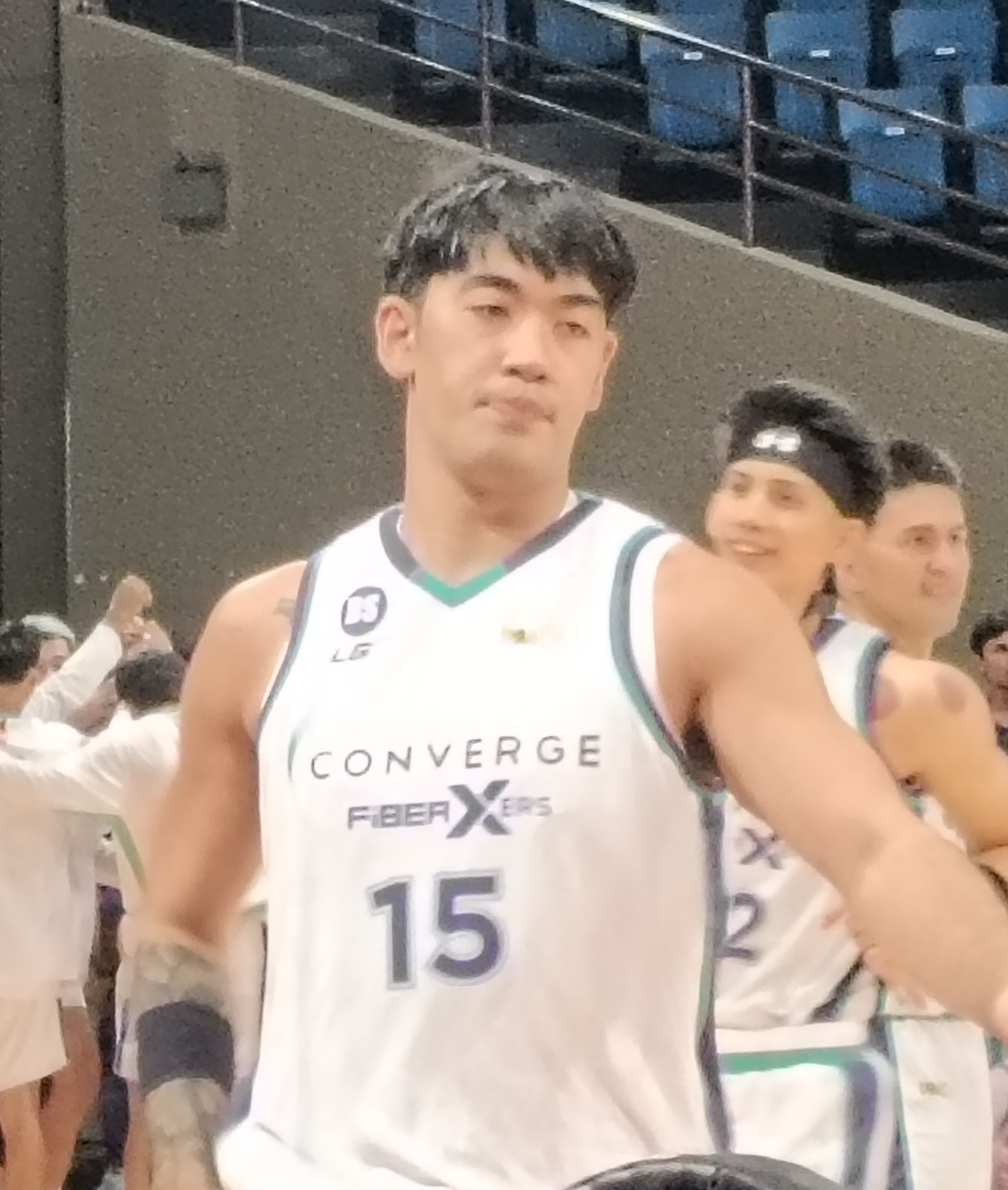
- Arana in 2025

No. 15 – Converge FiberXers
- Position: Center
- League: PBA

Personal information
- Born: March 21, 1999 (age 27) Daet, Camarines Norte, Philippines
- Listed height: 6 ft 7 in (2.01 m)
- Listed weight: 231 lb (105 kg)

Career information
- High school: Basud National (Basud, Camarines Norte)
- College: UST (2015–2017); Arellano (2019–2022)
- PBA draft: 2022: 1st round, 4th overall pick
- Drafted by: Converge FiberXers
- Playing career: 2022–present

Career history
- 2022–present: Converge FiberXers

Career highlights
- PBA All-Star (2026); PBA Mythical Second Team (2025); PBA Rookie of the Year (2023); PBA Greats vs. Stalwarts Game MVP (2024); NCAA Mythical Team (2021); NCAA Defensive Player of the year (2021); 2× NCAA All-Defensive Team (2019, 2021); NCAA Rookie of the Year (2019)

Justin Arana (born March 21, 1999) is a Filipino professional basketball player for the Converge FiberXers of the Philippine Basketball Association (PBA). After overcoming a heart condition while with the UST Growling Tigers, he went on to become a dominant college basketball player with the Arellano Chiefs.

== Early life and high school career ==
Arana started playing basketball at a young age, learning to shoot with a ring attached to a mango tree built by his father. He then started playing in inter-barangay leagues.

By the time Arana was a first year high school student at Basud National High School, he was already 6'2". He was recruited to join his high school varsity basketball team in his third year, and by that time had grown two more inches. A year later in 2015, he played in Bicol's Regional Meet and in the Palarong Pambansa, which helped him get noticed by big colleges and universities.

== College career ==
=== UST Growling Tigers ===
Arana then joined the UST Growling Tigers. He made the team right away, but in his first two years, played few minutes. In his junior season, he was diagnosed with mitral valve prolapse after he collapsed in an offseason tuneup game. As a result, he was limited to just five games that season. He left the team before the start of the UAAP Season 81 due to conflict with a team manager. He thought that his basketball career in the major college leagues was over and considered going back home to his province.

=== Arellano Chiefs ===
After Arana had left UST, he was recruited by one of his former assistant coaches at UST to join him and the Arellano Chiefs. He used his entire residency year to continue his recovery, undergoing weekly 2D echo tests and drinking maintenance medicine – all expenses the university shouldered.

==== NCAA Season 95: NCAA Rookie of the Year ====
Arellano started Season 95 with a record of 1–5, including a loss to the UPHSD Altas in which he had 20 points, 10 rebounds, and seven blocks. The following game, he had a career-high 25 points on 9-of-12 shooting, but they still lost to the Benilde Blazers. He was able to lead Arellano to an upset win over the Lyceum Pirates with 24 points on 9-of-14 shooting, with 11 rebounds and three blocks. As a result, he was awarded Player of the Week. In a loss to the San Beda Red Lions, he led the team with 23 points, 15 rebounds, and four blocks. Arellano then got a win over the Altas, in which he contributed 17 points, seven rebounds, and two blocks. They got their fourth win of the season over Benilde, in which he had 13 points, 10 rebounds, and five blocks before fouling out. That would be their last win, as they finished with a record of 4–14 in last place. He was awarded as the NCAA's Rookie of the Year along with an All-Defensive Team selection with averages of 13.4 points, 7.8 rebounds, 2.8 blocks, and 1.4 assists. He also played in the NCAA's All-Star Game, leading the losing team with 22 points and seven rebounds.

==== NCAA Season 97: Final season ====
Arana was set to return for one more year for Season 96, turning down the opportunity to join the PBA Draft. However, basketball was not part of Season 96's calendar due to COVID-19 protocols and his eligibility was transferred to the next season. He received interest from B.League teams during this time.

In Arellano's first game of Season 97, Arana had 16 points, 15 rebounds, and four blocks, but couldn't finish the game due to an injury. He was initially diagnosed with a partial ACL tear and ruled out for the season. However, after getting another diagnosis, his ligament was revealed to still be intact, allowing him to return to playing. He made his return in a loss to Benilde, putting up 14 points, 11 rebounds, two assists, and three blocks in limited minutes. In a loss to UPHSD, he had 14 points, 12 rebounds, a steal, and two blocks. Arellano finally ended its losing streak with him leading the way with 17 points, 15 rebounds, three assists, and three blocks. Halfway through the eliminations, he averaged 15.3 points, 13.3 rebounds (tied for first in the league), and a league-leading 3.8 blocks per game, making a case as the league's MVP.

In a loss to Lyceum, Arana had a double-double performance of 17 points and 24 rebounds, adding to four blocks, an assist, and a steal, in a losing effort. In a crucial win over the EAC Generals, he put up 21 points and 18 rebounds to go along with three assists and three blocks. He then collected a career-high 29 rebounds alongside 18 points and two blocks while playing all 40 minutes and made two clutch free throws in a win over the JRU Heavy Bombers that secured them a spot in the play-in game. His 29 rebounds were just one short of the record for most rebounds grabbed in a single NCAA game, which was set in 2015 by Allwell Oraeme. In the play-in game, the Chiefs were defeated by the Altas and their hopes for making the Final Four were ended. With their early exit, he was no longer in contention for MVP, as they were only awarded to those who led their team to the Final Four. He was still able to win Defensive Player of the Year, and claimed spots on the NCAA's Mythical and All-Defensive Teams. In his final season, he averaged 14.8 points, 17.1 rebounds, and 2.8 blocks in nine games. He then declared for the 2022 PBA draft, ending speculations that he would join a B.League team.

== Professional career ==
=== Converge FiberXers (2022–present) ===
==== 2022–23 season: Rookie season ====
Arana was selected 4th overall pick by the Converge FiberXers in the 2022 PBA draft. In his PBA debut during the Philippine Cup, he had six points, nine rebounds, three blocks, a steal, and an assist in 27 minutes of a loss to the Rain or Shine Elasto Painters. He then got a double-double of 10 points and 12 rebounds in a win over the Terrafirma Dyip. In a game against the Blackwater Bossing, he was underperforming as he just had four points on 1-of-5 shooting by the end of the third quarter. Still, he played in the fourth quarter and made clutch baskets and a crucial block on Jvee Casio to give Converge the win, finishing with 13 points and five rebounds.

In Converge's first game of the Commissioner's Cup, Arana contributed 13 points and seven rebounds to give their new head coach Aldin Ayo his first win in the PBA. He then put up 14 points along with nine boards, three handouts and a steal in a loss to the Magnolia Hotshots. In a win over the TNT Tropang Giga, he had a double-double of 14 points and 10 rebounds. That conference, Converge won seven straight games to get into the playoffs, with their last win coming from against Rain or Shine in which he had 16 points, seven rebounds, and the game-winning shot. However, they lost their last two games to drop to 5th place in the standings, although he was able to put up a PBA career-high 23 points in their last game of the Commissioner's Cup. In the playoffs, they were eliminated by the San Miguel Beermen.

In another win over Terrafirma during the Governors' Cup, Arana finished with 15 points and six rebounds. They won their first four games of the conference, including a win over Rain or Shine in which he had 21 points and eight rebounds. Their win streak was ended by the Tropang Giga. Against the Beermen, although he only had nine points and eight rebounds, he limited the Beermen's June Mar Fajardo to just seven points and 10 rebounds as Converge gave them their first loss of the conference. He was then one of the first picks for the Rookie/Sophomore/Juniors game of that year's All-Star Weekend. In that game, he contributed 23 points for the winning team. Although Converge made the playoffs once again, they were eliminated once again by San Miguel.

== National team career ==
Arana had been considered for the Philippine men's national team since 2022, when he was named to the rookie pool before he was drafted into the PBA. In 2026, during the fourth window of qualifying for the FIBA World Cup Asian Qualifiers, he was one of the final cuts from the roster. After Carl Tamayo went down with an ankle injury, he was brought in as Tamayo's replacement. Although he didn't play in that window, he was then added to the Philippines' roster for the 2026 Asian Games.

== Career statistics ==
Legend
GP	Games played	MPG	Minutes per game	FG%	Field-goal percentage
3FG%	3-point field-goal percentage	4P%	4-point field-goal percentage	FT%	Free-throw percentage
RPG	Rebounds per game	APG	Assists per game	SPG	Steals per game
BPG	Blocks per game	PPG	Points per game	127	Career high

As of the end of 2024–25 season

=== PBA season-by-season averages ===
Year	Team	GP	MPG	FG%	3P%	4P%	FT%	RPG	APG	SPG	BPG	PPG
2022–23	Converge	37	24.6	.535	—	—	.644	7.5	1.1	.4	1.2	9.9
2023–24	Converge	22	28.8	.595	—	—	.643	7.0	1.7	.2	.8	17.0
2024–25	Converge	40	27.5	.525	.000	.000	.623	7.9	2.1	.4	.5	14.2
Career		99	26.7	.546	.000	.000	.634	7.3	1.4	.4	.8	13.2

=== UAAP ===
Year	Team	GP	MPG	FG%	3P%	FT%	RPG	APG	SPG	BPG	PPG
2015–16	UST	2	1.2	.000	.000	.000	.0	.0	.0	.0	.0
2016–17	UST	8	7.1	.308	.000	.500	1.3	.3	.1	.0	1.5
2017–18	UST	6	8.6	.389	.000	.571	3.5	.3	.2	.2	3.7
Career		16	6.9	.355	.000	.545	1.9	.3	.1	.1	2.1
