= Ligang labas =

Philippine sports terminology

In Philippine sports, mostly in basketball, ligang labas (lit. 'outside league') is a Tagalog-language term for playing in a sports league other than where a player's team is primarily playing. It is also a description used by former Philippine Basketball Association (PBA) players for the leagues that they've played in after leaving the PBA.

Although playing in ligang labas allows players to continue pursuing their careers, they may also be subject to penalties if the player is still under contract with another team, including a ban from playing in the PBA.

== Benefits ==
Pay in ligang labas is lucrative for ex-professionals. Players such as Val Acuña and Lester Alvarez pursued careers via ligang labas after being cut from the PBA rosters. Other players in ligang labas include Mark Andaya, former PBA Best Import Jamelle Cornley, two-time Finals MVP Marc Pingris, and nine-time champion Arwind Santos.

Several ligang labas legends found their way in the rosters of the Maharlika Pilipinas Basketball League (MPBL), which itself became professional in 2022 and had a restriction on the number of ex-PBA players per roster until the league abolished the limit in 2024.

== Penalties ==
Being caught playing in ligang labas while actually in an active roster of another team is almost always severely dealt with. Players sign exclusive contracts to play for their team, and playing elsewhere is a violation of that contract. Players have been suspended, and won games have been forfeited upon proving that a player played in a ligang labas game. Examples of suspended players are Vic Manuel and Ping Exciminiano of the Alaska Aces, Jeff Viernes of the Phoenix Fuel Masters, Ben Mbala of the De La Salle Green Archers, Eloy Poligrates of the Southwestern University Cobras and RK Ilagan of the San Sebastian Stags. Ilagan's case even involved the National Collegiate Athletic Association docking the Stags' two wins in the 2018 tournament.

Alaska's Calvin Abueva and Gabby Espinas escaped suspension when caught in a ligang labas game in 2013.

On April 23, 2023, during the 2023 PBA offseason, J.R. Quiñahan, along with Beau Belga, Jio Jalalon and Robert Bolick, participated in an exhibition match in Cebu. In the fourth quarter, a foreign player swung at Quiñahan, and he punched back, starting a brawl. Quiñahan's involvement in the brawl shocked NLEX's management, as he had been recovering from Achilles tendon surgery and hadn't been practicing with the team for a long while, other than shooting drills, some weight training, and strengthening during practices. Belga was then suspended for six working days without pay for his involvement by Rain or Shine. Belga's teammate Rey Nambatac was also revealed to be playing in ligang labas and was fined for two days' worth of salary. Magnolia then fined Jalalon for 15 days without pay, as he had been a repeat offender. The players involved in the Cebu brawl were then fined by the PBA itself, along with Nambatac, Arwind Santos, Barkley Eboña, Jhonard Clarito, Vic Manuel and Allyn Bulanadi, as they also participated in different ligang labas games. Bolick, who also played in the Cebu exhibition game, was not penalized by the league, as his PBA contract had expired. On May 6, 2023, NLEX terminated Quiñahan's contract, making him a free agent.

In February 2024, Converge FiberXers terminated the contract of Mac Tallo after he participated in a Cebu tournament without the consent of his team and the PBA. Indefinite bans from the PBA were also given by the league to Kyt Jimenez and Larry Muyang for similar reasons, though both players were given the option to appeal the ban.

== Tolerance ==
By 2024, the UAAP notably allows its players to play in ligang labas as long as players keep their amateur status by not joining a professional league such as the PBA and the Premier Volleyball League. This comes after the revelation that La Salle basketball player Kevin Quiambao played in ligang labas in Alabang while the UAAP season was ongoing; Quiambao denied being paid as much as 200,000 pesos (US$3,400) to play in ligang labas games and that La Salle approved of his participation.
