= Keith Zaldivar =

Filipino basketball player

No. 5 – Terrafirma Dyip
- Position: Center
- League: PBA

Personal information
- Born: June 25, 1996 (age 30) Philippines
- Listed height: 6 ft 6 in (1.98 m)

Career information
- High school: Adamson (Manila)
- College: Adamson
- PBA draft: 2022: 1st round, 12th overall pick
- Drafted by: Magnolia Chicken Timplados Hotshots
- Playing career: 2022–present

Career history
- 2022–2023: Magnolia Chicken Timplados Hotshots
- 2023–2024: Converge FiberXers
- 2024–present: Terrafirma Dyip

Keith Howell "Pong" D. Zaldivar (born June 25, 1996) is a Filipino professional basketball player for the Terrafirma Dyip of the Philippine Basketball Association (PBA). He played college basketball for the Adamson Soaring Falcons

Zaldivar played high school basketball for the Adamson Baby Falcons. He was a center of the Adamson Soaring Falcons of the University Athletic Association of the Philippines (UAAP), with Jerom Lastimosa playing the point.

In May 2022, the Magnolia Hotshots drafted Zaldivar 12th overall. They would later let go of him, leading to his signing of a new contract with the Converge FiberXers on his sophomore year in the professional league PBA.

On February 7, 2024, Zaldivar got the most votes from fans for the PBA All-Star RSJ game.

On November 12, 2024, Zaldivar was traded to the Terrafirma Dyip along with Aljun Melecio and the 2025 Converge first-round pick for the draft rights of Jordan Heading.

== PBA career statistics ==
Legend
GP	Games played	MPG	Minutes per game	FG%	Field-goal percentage
3FG%	3-point field-goal percentage	4P%	4-point field-goal percentage	FT%	Free-throw percentage
RPG	Rebounds per game	APG	Assists per game	SPG	Steals per game
BPG	Blocks per game	PPG	Points per game	127	Career high

As of the end of 2025–26 season

=== Season-by-season averages ===
Year	Team	GP	MPG	FG%	3P%	4P%	FT%	RPG	APG	SPG	BPG	PPG
2022–23	Magnolia	14	4.6	.500	.000	—	.000	.5	.1	—	—	1.3
2023–24	Converge	10	10.8	.270	.250	—	—	1.2	.5	.1	.3	2.8
2024–25	Converge	18	13.0	.306	.295	.000	.818	1.5	.3	.3	.1	3.3
2024–25	Terrafirma	18	13.0	.306	.295	.000	.818	1.5	.3	.3	.1	3.3
2025–26	Terrafirma	30	10.6	.422	.250	—	.500	1.4	.4	.2	.2	2.7
Career		72	9.7	.365	.256	.000	.647	1.2	.3	.2	.2	2.6
