= 2024 PBA Philippine Cup =

Second conference of the 2023–24 PBA season

- Duration: February 28 – June 16, 2024
- TV partner(s): Local: RPTV; PBA Rush (HD); International: Pilipinas Live; Online: Pilipinas Live

Finals
- Champions: Meralco Bolts
- Runners-up: San Miguel Beermen

Awards
- Best Player: June Mar Fajardo (San Miguel Beermen)
- Finals MVP: Chris Newsome (Meralco Bolts)

PBA Philippine Cup chronology
- < 2022 2025 >

PBA conference chronology
- < 2023–24 Commissioner's 2024 Governors' >

The 2024 PBA Philippine Cup, also known as the 2024 Honda PBA Philippine Cup for sponsorship reasons, was the second and final conference of the 2023–24 PBA season of the Philippine Basketball Association (PBA). The 45th PBA Philippine Cup started on February 28 and ended on June 16, 2024. The tournament does not allow teams to hire foreign players or imports.

The opening was originally scheduled on March 3, but was moved earlier to February 28 to give way for the Philippines men's national basketball team's participation in the FIBA Men's Olympic Qualifying Tournament to be held on July 2–7, 2024.

== Format ==
- All participating teams play in a single round-robin elimination, with each team playing 11 games throughout the duration of the conference.
- Teams are ranked by win-loss records with the top eight teams advancing to the playoffs. Any ties are broken using tiebreaker criteria.
  - If there is a tie for 8th place, a one-game playoff is instead used to determine which team gets the final playoff spot.
- The playoff formats are as follows:
  - Quarterfinals:
    - Twice-to-beat matches: 1st vs. 8th, 2nd vs. 7th
    - Best-of-three matches: 3rd vs. 6th, 4th vs. 5th
  - Semifinals (best-of-seven series):
    - Matches: 1st/8th vs. 4th/5th; 2nd/7th vs. 3rd/6th
  - Finals (best-of-seven series)

== Elimination round ==
=== Team standings ===
Pos	Team	W	L	PCT	GB	Qualification
1	San Miguel Beermen	10	1	.909	—	Twice-to-beat in the quarterfinals
2	Barangay Ginebra San Miguel	7	4	.636	3	Twice-to-beat in the quarterfinals
3	Meralco Bolts	6	5	.545 (Note: Head-to-head quotient: Meralco 1.06, TNT 1.03, Rain or Shine 1.01, NLEX 0.99, Magnolia 0.90)	4	Best-of-three quarterfinals
4	TNT Tropang Giga	6	5	.545	4	Best-of-three quarterfinals
5	Rain or Shine Elasto Painters	6	5	.545	4	Best-of-three quarterfinals
6	NLEX Road Warriors	6	5	.545	4	Best-of-three quarterfinals
7	Magnolia Chicken Timplados Hotshots	6	5	.545	4	Twice-to-win in the quarterfinals
8	Terrafirma Dyip	5	6	.455 (Note: Eighth seed playoff: Terrafirma 104–96 NorthPort)	5	Twice-to-win in the quarterfinals
9	NorthPort Batang Pier	5	6	.455	5	
10	Blackwater Bossing	4	7	.364	6	
11	Phoenix Fuel Masters	3	8	.273	7	
12	Converge FiberXers	2	9	.182	8	

Source: PBA.ph
Rules for classification: 1) winning percentage; 2) if two teams are tied, head-to-head record; if three or more teams are tied, head-to-head goal average (quotient); if tied for 8th, one-game playoff; 3) overall quotient; 4) coin toss

=== Results table ===
Team	Game										
Team	1	2	3	4	5	6	7	8	9	10	11
Barangay Ginebra (BGSM)	ROS; 113–107	PHX; 102–92	MER; 73–91	MAG; 87–77	SMB; 92–95	TER; 85–91	BWB; 105–86	NP; 95–88	TNT; 87–83	CON; 105–93	NLEX; 72–76
Blackwater (BWB)	MER; 96–93	TNT; 87–78	CON; 90–78	NLEX; 97–103	TER; 91–92	ROS; 103–110	BGSM; 86–105	MAG; 77–81	NP; 113–115	SMB; 109–124	PHX; 102–83
Converge (CON)	TER; 99–107	NP; 104–112*	BWB; 78–90	NLEX; 93–115	MAG; 75–106	ROS; 90–110	PHX; 107–113	SMB; 103–112	MER; 104–99	BGSM; 93–105	TNT; 107–103
Magnolia (MAG)	CON; 106–75	BGSM; 77–87	NLEX; 74–87	NP; 104–97	PHX; 107–93	BWB; 81–77	ROS; 108–102	SMB; 91–98	MER; 51–74	TER; 108–100	TNT; 93–98
Meralco (MER)	BWB; 93–96	ROS; 121–117*	NLEX; 96–99	NP; 85–90	BGSM; 91–73	TER; 86–83	TNT; 90–92	CON; 99–104	PHX; 82–76	MAG; 74–51	SMB; 95–92
NLEX	NP; 107–100*	TER; 95–99	MER; 99–96	CON; 115–93	BWB; 103–97	MAG; 87–74	TNT; 101–104	PHX; 77–112	SMB; 103–120	ROS; 104–120	BGSM; 76–72
NorthPort (NP)	NLEX; 100–107*	CON; 112–104*	PHX; 124–120	MER; 90–85	TNT; 112–96	MAG; 97–104	BGSM; 88–95	ROS; 105–115	SMB; 100–120	TER; 108–110	BWB; 115–113
Phoenix (PHX)	NP; 120–124	BGSM; 92–102	TER; 94–76	ROS; 85–100	SMB; 102–116	CON; 113–107	MAG; 93–107	NLEX; 112–77	TNT; 101–108	MER; 76–82	SMB; 83–102
Rain or Shine (ROS)	TNT; 107–108	MER; 117–121*	BBSM; 107–113	SMB; 97–109	PHX; 100–85	CON; 110–90	BWB; 110–103	TER; 116–104	NP; 115–105	MAG; 102–108	NLEX; 120–104
San Miguel (SMB)	ROS; 109–97	TNT; 91–89	PHX; 116–102	BGSM; 95–92	TER; 113–110	CON; 112–103	NP; 120–100	MAG; 98–91	NLEX; 120–103	BWB; 124–109	MER; 92–95
Terrafirma (TER)	CON; 107–99	NLEX; 99–95	TNT; 97–100	PHX; 78–94	BWB; 92–91	MER; 83–86	BGSM; 91–85	SMB; 110–113	ROS; 104–116	NP; 110–108	MAG; 100–108
TNT	ROS; 108–107	BWB; 76–87	TER; 100–97	SMB; 89–91	NP; 96–112	MER; 92–90	NLEX; 104–101	BGSM; 83–87	PHX; 108–101	CON; 103–107	MAG; 98–93

Updated to match(es) played on unknown. Source: PBA.ph
Legend: Blue = win; Red = loss; Matches with lighter background shading were decided after overtime. (*) Number of asterisks denotes number of overtime periods

== Eighth seed playoff ==
RPTV

May 8
7:30 pm

Box score

NorthPort Batang Pier 96, Terrafirma Dyip 104
Scoring by quarter: 33–27, 21–28, 27–27, 15–22
Pts: Lucero 17; Rebs: Tolentino 8 Asts: Munzon, Tolentino 4	Pts: Tiongson 30; Rebs: Go, Holt 8 Asts: Holt 9

Ninoy Aquino Stadium, Manila
Referees: Jimmy Mariano, Sherwin Pineda, Rey Yante, James Paez

== Bracket ==
Quarterfinals
(#1 twice-to-beat)
1	San Miguel	95	110
8	Terrafirma	106	91
(Best-of-3)
4	TNT	1
5	Rain or Shine	2
(#2 twice-to-beat)
2	Barangay Ginebra	99
7	Magnolia	77
(Best-of-3)
3	Meralco	2
6	NLEX	0

Semifinals (Best-of-7)
1	San Miguel	4
5	Rain or Shine	0
2	Barangay Ginebra	3
3	Meralco	4

Finals (Best-of-7)
1	San Miguel	2
3	Meralco	4

== Quarterfinals ==
=== (1) San Miguel vs. (8) Terrafirma ===
San Miguel has the twice-to-beat advantage; they have to be beaten twice, while their opponents just once, to advance.

RPTV

May 11
3:00 pm

Box score

San Miguel Beermen 95, Terrafirma Dyip 106
Scoring by quarter: 26–27, 27–23, 24–28, 22–24
Pts: Fajardo 21; Rebs: Fajardo 16; Asts: Ross 4	Pts: Tiongson 29; Rebs: Gómez de Liaño 10; Asts: Gómez de Liaño 8

Rizal Memorial Coliseum, Manila
Referees: Peter Balao, Jerry Narandan, Niño Cortez, Charlie Amparado

RPTV

May 15
4:30 pm

Box score

San Miguel Beermen 110, Terrafirma Dyip 91
Scoring by quarter: 20–25, 25–19, 34–22, 31–25
Pts: Fajardo 25; Rebs: Fajardo 22; Asts: Perez 8	Pts: Gómez de Liaño 23; Rebs: Go 12; Asts: Holt 5
San Miguel wins series in two games

Ninoy Aquino Stadium, Manila
Referees: Nol Quilinguen, Albert Nubla, Jeffrey Tantay, Irewin Traballo

=== (2) Barangay Ginebra vs. (7) Magnolia ===
Barangay Ginebra has the twice-to-beat advantage; they have to be beaten twice, while their opponents just once, to advance.

RPTV

May 11
6:15 pm

Box score

Barangay Ginebra San Miguel 99, Magnolia Chicken Timplados Hotshots 77
Scoring by quarter: 28–17, 24–19, 28–22, 19–19
Pts: Standhardinger 36; Rebs: Standhardinger 11; Asts: Thompson 10	Pts: Barroca 19; Rebs: Abueva 9 Asts: Barroca 8
Barangay Ginebra wins series in one game

Rizal Memorial Coliseum, Manila
Referees: Nol Quilinguen, Bing Oliva, Mardy Montoya, Kenny Hallig

=== (3) Meralco vs. (6) NLEX ===
This is a best-of-three playoff.

RPTV

May 10
4:30 pm

Box score

Meralco Bolts 97, NLEX Road Warriors 93
Scoring by quarter: 23–28, 21–26, 29–21, 24–18
Pts: Maliksi 22; Rebs: Hodge, Newsome 7 Asts: Newsome 6	Pts: Bolick 48; Rebs: three players 5 Asts: Bolick 5

Araneta Coliseum, Quezon City
Referees: Nol Quilinguen, Mike Flordeliza, Albert Nubla, Irewin Traballo

RPTV

May 12
6:15 pm

Box score

Meralco Bolts 100, NLEX Road Warriors 81
Scoring by quarter: 27–26, 25–23, 24–21, 24–11
Pts: Banchero 23; Rebs: Newsome 9 Asts: Banchero 6	Pts: Bolick 18; Rebs: Fajardo, Miranda 6 Asts: Rodger 7
Meralco wins series, 2–0

Rizal Memorial Coliseum, Manila
Referees: Peter Balao, Sherwin Pineda, Mardy Montoya, Kenny Hallig

=== (4) TNT vs. (5) Rain or Shine ===
This is a best-of-three playoff.

RPTV

May 10
7:30 pm

Box score

TNT Tropang Giga 116, Rain or Shine Elasto Painters 99
Scoring by quarter: 26–24, 27–28, 32–27, 31–20
Pts: Oftana 32; Rebs: Williams 10; Asts: Castro, Pogoy 5	Pts: Santillan 23; Rebs: Borboran 5 Asts: Caracut 4

Araneta Coliseum, Quezon City
Referees: Sherwin Pineda, Bing Oliva, Jeffrey Tantay, Niño Cortez

RPTV

May 12
3:00 pm

Box score

TNT Tropang Giga 113, Rain or Shine Elasto Painters 121
Scoring by quarter: 31–25, 33–37, 31–33, 18–26
Pts: Pogoy 28; Rebs: Khobuntin 9 Asts: Castro 8	Pts: Clarito 29; Rebs: Clarito 7 Asts: Belga 5

Rizal Memorial Coliseum, Manila
Referees: Jimmy Mariano, Rey Yante, Jerry Narandan, Karlo Vergara

RPTV

May 15
7:30 pm

Box score

TNT Tropang Giga 109, Rain or Shine Elasto Painters 110
Scoring by quarter: 22–39, 23–20, 27–30, 37–21
Pts: Williams 32; Rebs: Williams 14; Asts: three players 4	Pts: Mamuyac 25; Rebs: Clarito 9 Asts: five players 3
Rain or Shine wins series, 2–1

Ninoy Aquino Stadium, Manila
Referees: Peter Balao, Sherwin Pineda, Bing Oliva, Mardy Montoya

== Semifinals ==
=== (1) San Miguel vs. (5) Rain or Shine ===
RPTV

May 17
4:30 pm

Box score

San Miguel Beermen 101, Rain or Shine Elasto Painters 98
Scoring by quarter: 31–24, 18–20, 33–33, 19–21
Pts: Fajardo 23; Rebs: Fajardo, Tautuaa 11; Asts: Fajardo 5	Pts: Mamuyac 20; Rebs: Santillan 8 Asts: Clarito 4

SM Mall of Asia Arena, Pasay
Referees: Jimmy Mariano, Bing Oliva, Albert Nubla, Jeffrey Tantay

RPTV

May 19
6:15 pm

Box score

San Miguel Beermen 106, Rain or Shine Elasto Painters 89
Scoring by quarter: 23–21, 30–24, 35–26, 18–18
Pts: Fajardo 22; Rebs: Perez 11; Asts: Romeo 5	Pts: Asistio 20; Rebs: Nocum 9 Asts: Nocum 4

SM Mall of Asia Arena, Pasay
Referees: Sherwin Pineda, Rommel Gruta, Jerry Narandan, Irewin Traballo

RPTV

May 22
4:30 pm

Box score

San Miguel Beermen 117, Rain or Shine Elasto Painters 107
Scoring by quarter: 25–24, 26–23, 40–38, 26–22
Pts: Perez 23; Rebs: Perez 14; Asts: Perez 5	Pts: Belga 19; Rebs: Santillan 11; Asts: Caracut 6

Dasmariñas Arena, Dasmariñas, Cavite
Referees: Jimmy Mariano, Sherwin Pineda, Mardy Montoya, Albert Nubla

RPTV

May 24
7:30 pm

Box score

San Miguel Beermen 107, Rain or Shine Elasto Painters 100
Scoring by quarter: 25–27, 16–28, 34–32, 30–13
Pts: Perez 26; Rebs: Fajardo 23; Asts: Fajardo 6	Pts: Mamuyac 30; Rebs: Belga, Demusis 8 Asts: Belga, Norwood 7
San Miguel wins series, 4–0

SM Mall of Asia Arena, Pasay
Referees: Nol Quilinguen, Rey Yante, Mike Flordeliza, Rommel Gruta

=== (2) Barangay Ginebra vs. (3) Meralco ===
RPTV

May 17
7:30 pm

Box score

Barangay Ginebra San Miguel 92, Meralco Bolts 88
Scoring by quarter: 22–22, 18–19, 33–20, 19–27
Pts: Pringle 22; Rebs: J. Aguilar, Thompson 8 Asts: Standhardinger 7	Pts: Newsome 21; Rebs: Newsome 13; Asts: Banchero 8

SM Mall of Asia Arena, Pasay
Referees: Peter Balao, Rommel Gruta, Rey Yante, Irewin Traballo

RPTV

May 19
3:00 pm

Box score

Barangay Ginebra San Miguel 91, Meralco Bolts 103
Scoring by quarter: 27–32, 15–23, 32–18, 17–30
Pts: Standhardinger 41; Rebs: Standhardinger 11; Asts: Standhardinger 4	Pts: Maliksi 25; Rebs: Hodge 10; Asts: three players 3

SM Mall of Asia Arena, Pasay
Referees: Nol Quilinguen, Bing Oliva, Mardy Montoya, Niño Cortez

RPTV

May 22
7:30 pm

Box score

Barangay Ginebra San Miguel 80, Meralco Bolts 87
Scoring by quarter: 18–31, 16–17, 25–24, 21–15
Pts: J. Aguilar 15; Rebs: Standhardinger 10; Asts: Tenorio, Thompson 4	Pts: Maliksi 16; Rebs: Almazan, Bates 9 Asts: Newsome 6

Dasmariñas Arena, Dasmariñas, Cavite
Referees: Nol Quilinguen, Mike Flordeliza, Jerry Narandan, Niño Cortez

RPTV

May 24
4:30 pm

Box score

Barangay Ginebra San Miguel 90, Meralco Bolts 71
Scoring by quarter: 31–15, 16–17, 26–17, 17–22
Pts: J. Aguilar 21; Rebs: Standhardinger 11; Asts: Standhardinger 8	Pts: Banchero, Maliksi 14; Rebs: Maliksi 6 Asts: Banchero 3

SM Mall of Asia Arena, Pasay
Referees: Peter Balao, Sherwin Pineda, Albert Nubla, Jeffrey Tantay

RPTV

May 26
6:15 pm

Box score

Barangay Ginebra San Miguel 89, Meralco Bolts 84
Scoring by quarter: 22–19, 18–25, 27–25, 22–15
Pts: Standhardinger 34; Rebs: J. Aguilar 12; Asts: Standhardinger 5	Pts: Banchero 18; Rebs: Hodge 8 Asts: Banchero 6

SM Mall of Asia Arena, Pasay
Referees: Rommel Gruta, Bing Oliva, Jerry Narandan, Jeffrey Tantay

RPTV

May 29
7:30 pm

Box score

Barangay Ginebra San Miguel 81, Meralco Bolts 86
Scoring by quarter: 18–19, 19–19, 16–16, 28–32
Pts: J. Aguilar, Standhardinger 19; Rebs: Thompson 12; Asts: Thompson 4	Pts: Quinto 23; Rebs: Almazan 11; Asts: Banchero 8

Araneta Coliseum, Quezon City
Referees: Rommel Gruta, Bing Oliva, Jerry Narandan, Niño Cortez

RPTV

May 31
7:30 pm

Box score

Barangay Ginebra San Miguel 69, Meralco Bolts 78
Scoring by quarter: 20–15, 11–21, 20–26, 18–16
Pts: Thompson 20; Rebs: J. Aguilar, Thompson 10; Asts: Thompson 6	Pts: Banchero 24; Rebs: Bates 13; Asts: Newsome 6
Meralco wins series, 4–3

FPJ Arena, San Jose, Batangas
Referees: Rommel Gruta, Bing Oliva, Mike Flordeliza, Jerry Narandan

== Finals ==
RPTV

June 5
7:30 pm

Box score

San Miguel Beermen 86, Meralco Bolts 93

Araneta Coliseum, Quezon City

RPTV

June 7
7:30 pm

Box score

San Miguel Beermen 95, Meralco Bolts 94

Araneta Coliseum, Quezon City

RPTV

June 9
6:15 pm

Box score

San Miguel Beermen 89, Meralco Bolts 93

Araneta Coliseum, Quezon City

RPTV

June 12
7:30 pm

Box score

San Miguel Beermen 111, Meralco Bolts 101

Araneta Coliseum, Quezon City

RPTV

June 14
7:30 pm

Box score

San Miguel Beermen 88, Meralco Bolts 92

Araneta Coliseum, Quezon City

RPTV

June 16
6:15 pm

Box score

San Miguel Beermen 78, Meralco Bolts 80
Meralco wins series, 4–2

Araneta Coliseum, Quezon City

== Awards ==
=== Players of the Week ===
Week	Player	Ref.
February 28 – March 3	Stephen Holt (Terrafirma Dyip)	
March 6–10	Robert Bolick (NLEX Road Warriors)	
March 13–17	Allein Maliksi (Meralco Bolts)	
March 31 – April 7	Beau Belga (Rain or Shine Elasto Painters)	
April 10–14	Ian Sangalang (Magnolia Chicken Timplados Hotshots)	
April 17–21	Marcio Lassiter (San Miguel Beermen)	
April 24–28	CJ Perez (San Miguel Beermen)	
May 1–5	Cliff Hodge (Meralco Bolts)	
May 8–12	Juami Tiongson (Terrafirma Dyip)	
May 15–19	June Mar Fajardo (San Miguel Beermen)	
May 22–26	Don Trollano (San Miguel Beermen)	
May 29–31	Chris Banchero (Meralco Bolts)	

== Statistics ==
=== Individual statistical leaders ===
Category	Player	Team	Statistic
Points per game	Robert Bolick	NLEX Road Warriors	27.4
Rebounds per game	June Mar Fajardo	San Miguel Beermen	14.1
Assists per game	Robert Bolick	NLEX Road Warriors	7.0
Steals per game	Joshua Munzon	NorthPort Batang Pier	2.7
Blocks per game	Kemark Cariño	Terrafirma Dyip	2.2
Turnovers per game	Justin Arana	Converge FiberXers	3.9
Fouls per game	Beau Belga	Rain or Shine Elasto Painters	3.8
Fouls per game	Isaac Go	Terrafirma Dyip	3.8
Minutes per game	Stephen Holt	Terrafirma Dyip	40.4
FG%	Brandon Bates	Meralco Bolts	85.7%
FT%	Jio Jalalon	Magnolia Chicken Timplados Hotshots	90.0%
3FG%	Andreas Cahilig	Terrafirma Dyip	57.1%
Double-doubles	June Mar Fajardo	San Miguel Beermen	21
Triple-doubles	Beau Belga	Rain or Shine Elasto Painters	1

=== Individual game highs ===
Category	Player	Team	Statistic
Points	Robert Bolick	NLEX Road Warriors	48
Rebounds	June Mar Fajardo	San Miguel Beermen	23
Assists	Andrei Caracut	Rain or Shine Elasto Painters	13
Assists	Stephen Holt	Terrafirma Dyip	13
Steals	Scottie Thompson	Barangay Ginebra San Miguel	7
Blocks	Brandon Bates	Meralco Bolts	6
Three point field goals	three players		7

=== Team statistical leaders ===
Category	Team	Statistic
Points per game	Rain or Shine Elasto Painters	109.1
Rebounds per game	Barangay Ginebra San Miguel	49.5
Assists per game	Rain or Shine Elasto Painters	26.3
Steals per game	NorthPort Batang Pier	11.6
Blocks per game	Terrafirma Dyip	5.1
Turnovers per game	Phoenix Fuel Masters	16.7
Fouls per game	Meralco Bolts	26.7
FG%	San Miguel Beermen	46.9%
FT%	Terrafirma Dyip	77.3%
3FG%	San Miguel Beermen	38.7%

== Final rankings ==
Pos	Team	Pld	W	L	Best finish
1	Meralco Bolts (C)	26	16	10	Champion
2	San Miguel Beermen	23	17	6	Runner-up
3	Barangay Ginebra San Miguel	19	11	8	Semifinalist
4	Rain or Shine Elasto Painters	18	8	10	Semifinalist
5	TNT Tropang Giga	14	7	7	Quarterfinalist
6	NLEX Road Warriors	13	6	7	Quarterfinalist
7	Magnolia Chicken Timplados Hotshots	12	6	6	Quarterfinalist
8	Terrafirma Dyip	14	7	7	Quarterfinalist
9	NorthPort Batang Pier	12	5	7	Elimination round
10	Blackwater Bossing	11	4	7	Elimination round
11	Phoenix Fuel Masters	11	3	8	Elimination round
12	Converge FiberXers	11	2	9	Elimination round

Rules for classification: 1) finals result, 2) elimination round seed of semifinalists, 3) elimination round seed of quarterfinalists, 4) elimination round finish
(C) Champions
