= Ralph Cu =

Filipino basketball player (born 1997)

No. 18 – Barangay Ginebra San Miguel
- Position: Power forward / small forward
- League: PBA

Personal information
- Born: March 8, 1997 (age 29)
- Listed height: 6 ft 4 in (1.93 m)
- Listed weight: 210 lb (95 kg)

Career information
- High school: Xavier School (San Juan)
- College: De La Salle
- PBA draft: 2023: 2nd round, 23rd overall pick
- Drafted by: Barangay Ginebra San Miguel
- Playing career: 2023–present

Career history
- 2023–present: Barangay Ginebra San Miguel

Career highlights
- PBA champion (2026 Commissioner's)

Louis Raphael Valeza Cu (born March 8, 1997) is a Filipino professional basketball player for the Barangay Ginebra San Miguel of the Philippine Basketball Association (PBA).

== High school career ==
In 2014, Cu teamed up with Tyler Tio to get Xavier into the finals of the Philippine Secondary Schools Basketball Championship (PSSBC). In the finals, they lost to San Beda College. He did not receive any offers coming out of high school.

== College career ==
Cu first played for DLSU's Team B. He got to represent DLSU in the UAAP's three-point shootout during Season 80. He was one of the last cuts of DLSU for Season 81.

Cu finally was called up to the main roster of the DLSU Green Archers in Season 82. He struggled with his shooting coming off the bench that season. In Season 84, he played in only three games, and averaged less than two points per game. He also played 3x3 basketball for DLSU that season, where they finished with a silver medal. However, for Season 85, his senior year, he was cut from the team.

== Professional career ==
After being cut from DLSU, Cu played professional 3x3 basketball for Barangay Ginebra. During this time, he also played for Ginebra in the pre-season series "PBA on Tour" as a rookie draft prospect.

=== Barangay Ginebra (2023–present) ===
Cu was drafted by Barangay Ginebra in the second round of the Season 48 draft with the 23rd overall pick. He was signed to a one-year deal with Ginebra.

In his first four games with Ginebra during the 2023–24 Commissioner's Cup, he did not score a point. Although he only played in eight games that conference, he impressed Coach Tim Cone with his passing and decision-making. He was selected to be part of Team Greats for the Greats vs. Stalwarts game during the 2024 PBA All-Star Weekend.

Before the start of the 2024 Philippine Cup, Cone had him train with Gilas Pilipinas as a practice player. In a win over the Phoenix Fuel Masters, he had 12 points, making four three-pointers. He then followed it up with 14 points with four three pointers once again in a win over the Blackwater Bossing. The following game, against the NorthPort Batang Pier, he led the team to the win with season-highs of 24 points on 6-of-11 shooting from three, 10 rebounds, and nine assists. He almost became the first rookie since teammate Scottie Thompson in 2016 to have a triple-double. In the playoffs, they beat the Magnolia Hotshots to enter the semifinals. In Game 1 of the semifinals, he stepped up with 18 points on six three pointers as Ginebra took the opening win. The series lasted seven games, with Meralco eventually eliminating them and moving on to the finals.

Ginebra made the finals in his second season, during the 2024 Governors' Cup against the TNT Tropang Giga. In his first finals appearance, Cu had 13 points, five rebounds, and six assists, and helped keep the game close before TNT pulled away. TNT went on to win the finals in six games. They also made the finals in the 2024–25 Commissioner's Cup.

== Personal life ==
Cu's father, Louie Cu, is a former UST Glowing Goldie who now runs a forwarding business. His girlfriend is volleyball player Jolina dela Cruz.
