= 2023–24 Terrafirma Dyip season =

- Head coach: Johnedel Cardel
- General Manager: Ronald Tubid
- Owner(s): Terrafirma Realty Development Corporation

Commissioner's Cup results
- Record: 2–9 (18.2%)
- Place: 10th
- Playoff finish: Did not qualify

Philippine Cup results
- Record: 5–6 (45.5%)
- Place: 8th
- Playoff finish: Quarterfinalist (lost to San Miguel with twice-to-win disadvantage)

Terrafirma Dyip seasons

The 2023–24 Terrafirma Dyip season was the 9th season of the franchise in the Philippine Basketball Association (PBA).

== Key dates ==
- September 17: The PBA season 48 draft was held at the Market! Market! in Taguig.

== Draft picks ==
Round	Pick	Player	Position	Place of birth	College
1	1	Stephen Holt	G	USA	Saint Mary's
1	12	Taylor Miller	G	USA	Westminster
2	13	Kemark Cariño	C/F	Philippines	San Beda
2	22	Louie Sangalang	F	Philippines	Letran
3	23	JB Bahio	F	Philippines	San Beda
4	36	Tommy Olivario	G	Philippines	Letran
5	47	Damie Cuntapay	C/F	Philippines	San Beda
6	58	Kenneth Villapando	F	Philippines	San Sebastian
7	65	Jeric Pido	G	Philippines	Mapúa
8	70	Enrique Caunan	F	Philippines	UST

== Roster ==
2023–24 Terrafirma Dyip roster
Players
Coaches

Pos.	#	POB	Name	Height	Weight	DOB (YYYY–MM–DD)	From
G/F	2	(United States)	Stephen Holt (R)	6 ft 4 in (1.93 m)	195 lb (88 kg)	1991–12–06	Saint Mary's
G	3	(Philippines)	Juami Tiongson	5 ft 10 in (1.78 m)	175 lb (79 kg)	1991–02–05	Ateneo
G	4	(Philippines)	Gelo Alolino	6 ft 0 in (1.83 m)	185 lb (84 kg)	1994–01–04	National-U
G	6	(Philippines)	Tommy Olivario (R)	5 ft 9 in (1.75 m)	190 lb (86 kg)		Letran
F	7	(Philippines)	Kevin Ferrer (injured)	6 ft 5 in (1.96 m)	188 lb (85 kg)	1993–03–26	UST
G	8	(Philippines)	JP Calvo	5 ft 7 in (1.70 m)		1997–09–29	Letran
F	10	(Sweden)	Andreas Cahilig	6 ft 5 in (1.96 m)		1991–01–22	EARIST
F/C	11	(Philippines)	Isaac Go	6 ft 7 in (2.01 m)		1996–06–07	Ateneo
F	13	(Philippines)	Eric Camson	6 ft 4 in (1.93 m)	228 lb (103 kg)	1990–05–12	Adamson
F/C	17	(Philippines)	Aldrech Ramos	6 ft 6 in (1.98 m)	190 lb (86 kg)	1988–04–03	Far Eastern
F	22	(Philippines)	Javi Gómez de Liaño	6 ft 3 in (1.91 m)	193 lb (88 kg)	1998–06–27	UP Diliman
G/F	29	(Philippines)	Allen Mina	6 ft 3 in (1.91 m)	185 lb (84 kg)	1996–09–22	Letran
F/C	33	(Philippines)	Kemark Cariño (R)	6 ft 9 in (2.06 m)	203 lb (92 kg)	1998–02–01	San Beda
F	66	(Philippines)	Louie Sangalang (R)	6 ft 4 in (1.93 m)	198 lb (90 kg)		Letran

Head coach

- (Philippines) Johnedel Cardel

Assistant coach(es)

- (Philippines) Raymond Tiongco (1st assistant)
- (Philippines) Raymond Gavieres
- (Philippines) Joe Lipa (consultant)

Team manager

- (Philippines) Ronald Tubid

Legend

- (C) Team captain
- (CI) Commissioner's Cup Import
- (GI) Governors' Cup Import
- (EI) EASL Import
- (DP) Unsigned draft pick
- (FA) Free agent
- (IN) Inactive
- (S) Suspended
- (R) Rookie
- Injured

Roster

== Preseason ==
=== PBA on Tour ===
==== Game log ====
2023 PBA on Tour game log
Total: 4–7
May: 0–2

Game	Date	Opponent	Score	High points	High rebounds	High assists	Location Attendance	Record
1	May 26	Converge	L 82–119	Juami Tiongson (17)	Kevin Ferrer (5)	JP Calvo (3)	Ynares Sports Arena	0–1
2	May 31	Blackwater	L 94–100	Juami Tiongson (22)	Andreas Cahilig (13)	Alolino, Tiongson (7)	Ynares Sports Arena	0–2

June: 3–3

Game	Date	Opponent	Score	High points	High rebounds	High assists	Location Attendance	Record
3	June 7	TNT	W 104–92	Juami Tiongson (21)	Andreas Cahilig (9)	Daquioag, Mina, Tiongson (3)	Ynares Sports Arena	1–2
4	June 11	Rain or Shine	L 95–121	Juami Tiongson (25)	Camson, Go (9)	Cahilig, Camson (3)	Ynares Center	1–3
5	June 16	NLEX	W 110–96	Juami Tiongson (37)	Andreas Cahilig (14)	Juami Tiongson (6)	Ynares Sports Arena	2–3
6	June 18	Meralco	W 107–102	Eric Camson (30)	Eric Camson (9)	Juami Tiongson (6)	Ynares Sports Arena	3–3
7	June 23	Phoenix Super LPG	L 92–104	Javi Gómez de Liaño (23)	Eric Camson (9)	Gelo Alolino (7)	Ynares Sports Arena	3–4
8	June 30	Barangay Ginebra	L 106–114	Javi Gómez de Liaño (23)	Javi Gómez de Liaño (11)	Gelo Alolino (6)	Ynares Sports Arena	3–5

July: 1–2

Game	Date	Opponent	Score	High points	High rebounds	High assists	Location Attendance	Record
9	July 9	NorthPort	L 100–104	Juami Tiongson (25)	Javi Gómez de Liaño (8)	Aldrech Ramos (6)	Ynares Sports Arena	3–6
10	July 16	San Miguel	W 85–72	Juami Tiongson (15)	Isaac Go (14)	Juami Tiongson (6)	Filoil EcoOil Centre	4–6
11	July 26	Magnolia	L 92–106	Cahilig, Gómez de Liaño (14)	Andreas Cahilig (9)	Alolino, Gómez de Liaño (4)	Filoil EcoOil Centre	4–7

== Commissioner's Cup ==
=== Eliminations ===
==== Standings ====
Pos	Team	W	L	PCT	GB	Qualification
1	Magnolia Chicken Timplados Hotshots	9	2	.818	—	Twice-to-beat in quarterfinals
2	San Miguel Beermen	8	3	.727 (Note: Head-to-head quotient: San Miguel 1.17, Barangay Ginebra 0.99, Phoenix Super LPG 0.98, Meralco 0.89)	1	Twice-to-beat in quarterfinals
3	Barangay Ginebra San Miguel	8	3	.727	1	Twice-to-beat in quarterfinals
4	Phoenix Super LPG Fuel Masters	8	3	.727	1	Twice-to-beat in quarterfinals
5	Meralco Bolts	8	3	.727	1	Twice-to-win in quarterfinals
6	NorthPort Batang Pier	6	5	.545 (Note: Head-to-head record: NorthPort 1–0 Rain or Shine)	3	Twice-to-win in quarterfinals
7	Rain or Shine Elasto Painters	6	5	.545	3	Twice-to-win in quarterfinals
8	TNT Tropang Giga	5	6	.455	4	Twice-to-win in quarterfinals
9	NLEX Road Warriors	4	7	.364	5	
10	Terrafirma Dyip	2	9	.182	7	
11	Blackwater Bossing	1	10	.091 (Note: Head-to-head record: Blackwater 1–0 Converge)	8	
12	Converge FiberXers	1	10	.091	8	

Source: PBA.ph
Rules for classification: 1) winning percentage; 2) if two teams are tied, head-to-head record; if three or more teams are tied, head-to-head goal average (quotient); if tied for 8th, one-game playoff; 3) overall quotient; 4) coin toss

==== Game log ====
2023–24 PBA Commissioner's Cup game log
Total: 2–9
November: 2–3

Game	Date	Opponent	Score	High points	High rebounds	High assists	Location Attendance	Record
1	November 10	NorthPort	L 103–108	Juami Tiongson (21)	Kemark Cariño (9)	Juami Tiongson (7)	Smart Araneta Coliseum	0–1
2	November 15	Blackwater	W 97–87	Juami Tiongson (25)	Thomas De Thaey (12)	Juami Tiongson (8)	Ynares Center	1–1
3	November 18	NLEX	W 113–112	Javi Gómez de Liaño (31)	Thomas De Thaey (16)	Holt, Tiongson (6)	Ynares Center	2–1
4	November 22	TNT	L 93–133	Javi Gómez de Liaño (16)	Isaac Go (11)	Stephen Holt (5)	Smart Araneta Coliseum	2–2
5	November 29	Phoenix Super LPG	L 84–103	Thomas De Thaey (18)	Thomas De Thaey (14)	Stephen Holt (5)	Smart Araneta Coliseum	2–3

December: 0–4

Game	Date	Opponent	Score	High points	High rebounds	High assists	Location Attendance	Record
6	December 3	Barangay Ginebra	L 99–110	Javi Gómez de Liaño (22)	Thomas De Thaey (14)	Javi Gómez de Liaño (7)	PhilSports Arena	2–4
7	December 13	Converge	L 94–103 (OT)	Juami Tiongson (28)	Thomas De Thaey (19)	Stephen Holt (3)	PhilSports Arena	2–5
8	December 20	Magnolia	L 91–104	Juami Tiongson (17)	Thomas De Thaey (13)	Stephen Holt (7)	Smart Araneta Coliseum	2–6
9	December 23	Rain or Shine	L 105–116	Thomas De Thaey (31)	Thomas De Thaey (14)	Gómez de Liaño, Tiongson (6)	Smart Araneta Coliseum	2–7

January: 0–2

Game	Date	Opponent	Score	High points	High rebounds	High assists	Location Attendance	Record
10	January 7	San Miguel	L 110–132	Javi Gómez de Liaño (26)	Thomas De Thaey (17)	Gelo Alolino (6)	Smart Araneta Coliseum	2–8
11	January 12	Meralco	L 102–109	Stephen Holt (26)	De Thaey, Holt, Tiongson (5)	Juami Tiongson (5)	Smart Araneta Coliseum	2–9

== Philippine Cup ==
=== Eliminations ===
==== Standings ====
Pos	Team	W	L	PCT	GB	Qualification
1	San Miguel Beermen	10	1	.909	—	Twice-to-beat in the quarterfinals
2	Barangay Ginebra San Miguel	7	4	.636	3	Twice-to-beat in the quarterfinals
3	Meralco Bolts	6	5	.545 (Note: Head-to-head quotient: Meralco 1.06, TNT 1.03, Rain or Shine 1.01, NLEX 0.99, Magnolia 0.90)	4	Best-of-three quarterfinals
4	TNT Tropang Giga	6	5	.545	4	Best-of-three quarterfinals
5	Rain or Shine Elasto Painters	6	5	.545	4	Best-of-three quarterfinals
6	NLEX Road Warriors	6	5	.545	4	Best-of-three quarterfinals
7	Magnolia Chicken Timplados Hotshots	6	5	.545	4	Twice-to-win in the quarterfinals
8	Terrafirma Dyip	5	6	.455 (Note: Eighth seed playoff: Terrafirma 104–96 NorthPort)	5	Twice-to-win in the quarterfinals
9	NorthPort Batang Pier	5	6	.455	5	
10	Blackwater Bossing	4	7	.364	6	
11	Phoenix Fuel Masters	3	8	.273	7	
12	Converge FiberXers	2	9	.182	8	

Source: PBA.ph
Rules for classification: 1) winning percentage; 2) if two teams are tied, head-to-head record; if three or more teams are tied, head-to-head goal average (quotient); if tied for 8th, one-game playoff; 3) overall quotient; 4) coin toss

==== Game log ====
2024 PBA Philippine Cup game log
Total: 5–6
March: 3–2

Game	Date	Opponent	Score	High points	High rebounds	High assists	Location Attendance	Record
1	March 1	Converge	W 107–99	Juami Tiongson (30)	Stephen Holt (10)	JP Calvo (6)	Smart Araneta Coliseum	1–0
2	March 3	NLEX	W 99–95	Juami Tiongson (21)	Isaac Go (12)	Gelo Alolino (6)	Smart Araneta Coliseum	2–0
3	March 9	TNT	L 97–100	Stephen Holt (24)	Stephen Holt (8)	Stephen Holt (7)	Smart Araneta Coliseum	2–1
4	March 13	Phoenix	L 78–94	Javi Gómez de Liaño (19)	Isaac Go (6)	Juami Tiongson (6)	PhilSports Arena	2–2
5	March 16	Blackwater	W 92–91	Stephen Holt (21)	Stephen Holt (13)	Javi Gómez de Liaño (4)	Rizal Memorial Coliseum	3–2
All-Star Break

April: 2–3

Game	Date	Opponent	Score	High points	High rebounds	High assists	Location Attendance	Record
6	April 3	Meralco	L 83–86	Holt, Tiongson (20)	Juami Tiongson (10)	Juami Tiongson (6)	Smart Araneta Coliseum	3–3
7	April 7	Barangay Ginebra	W 91–85	Juami Tiongson (25)	Stephen Holt (11)	Stephen Holt (6)	Ninoy Aquino Stadium	4–3
8	April 10	San Miguel	L 110–113	Juami Tiongson (24)	Cahilig, Go, Gómez de Liaño, Holt (7)	Stephen Holt (10)	Ninoy Aquino Stadium	4–4
9	April 13	Rain or Shine	L 104–116	Holt, Tiongson (20)	Javi Gómez de Liaño (10)	Stephen Holt (13)	Caloocan Sports Complex	4–5
10	April 24	NorthPort	W 110–108	Stephen Holt (22)	Stephen Holt (12)	Juami Tiongson (6)	Ninoy Aquino Stadium	5–5

May: 0–1

Game	Date	Opponent	Score	High points	High rebounds	High assists	Location Attendance	Record
11	May 3	Magnolia	L 100–108	Stephen Holt (32)	Isaac Go (10)	Stephen Holt (8)	PhilSports Arena	5–6

=== Playoffs ===
==== Bracket ====
Quarterfinals
(#1 twice-to-beat)
1	San Miguel	95	110
8	Terrafirma	106	91
(Best-of-3)
4	TNT	1
5	Rain or Shine	2
(#2 twice-to-beat)
2	Barangay Ginebra	99
7	Magnolia	77
(Best-of-3)
3	Meralco	2
6	NLEX	0

Semifinals (Best-of-7)
1	San Miguel	4
5	Rain or Shine	0
2	Barangay Ginebra	3
3	Meralco	4

Finals (Best-of-7)
1	San Miguel	2
3	Meralco	4

==== Game log ====
2024 PBA Philippine Cup playoffs game log
Total: 2–1
8th seed playoff: 1–0

Game	Date	Opponent	Score	High points	High rebounds	High assists	Location Attendance	Series
1	May 8	NorthPort	W 104–96	Juami Tiongson (30)	Go, Holt (8)	Stephen Holt (9)	Ninoy Aquino Stadium	1–0

Quarterfinals: 1–1

Game	Date	Opponent	Score	High points	High rebounds	High assists	Location Attendance	Series
1	May 11	San Miguel	W 106–95	Juami Tiongson (29)	Javi Gómez de Liaño (10)	Javi Gómez de Liaño (8)	Rizal Memorial Coliseum	1–0
2	May 15	San Miguel	W 91–110	Javi Gómez de Liaño (23)	Isaac Go (12)	Stephen Holt (5)	Ninoy Aquino Stadium	1–1

== Transactions ==
=== Free agency ===
==== Signings ====
Player	Date signed	Contract amount	Contract length	Former team
Allen Mina	May 12, 2023	Not disclosed	1 year	Re-signed
Kevin Ferrer	February 1, 2024	Not disclosed	1 year	Re-signed
Isaac Go	February 7, 2024	Not disclosed	1 year	Re-signed
Andreas Cahilig	February 7, 2024	Not disclosed	2 years	Re-signed

==== Subtractions ====
Player	Number	Position	Reason	New team
Joseph Gabayni	18	Center	End of contract; did not agree to term extension	Bulacan Kuyas (MPBL)
Alex Cabagnot	5	Point guard / Shooting guard	Free agent	Goyang Sono Skygunners (KBL)

=== Recruited imports ===
Tournament	Name	Debuted	Last game	Record
Commissioner's Cup	Thomas De Thaey	November 10, 2023 (vs. NorthPort)	January 12, 2024 (vs. Meralco)	2–8

== Awards ==
Recipient	Award	Date awarded
Stephen Holt	2023–24 PBA Rookie of the Year	August 18, 2024
Honors
Stephen Holt	2023–24 PBA Mythical Second Team	August 18, 2024
Juami Tiongson	2023–24 PBA Mythical Second Team	August 18, 2024
Kemark Cariño	2023–24 PBA All-Defensive Team	August 18, 2024
