= 2023–24 PBA Commissioner's Cup =

First conference of the 2023–24 PBA season

- Duration: November 5, 2023 – February 14, 2024
- TV partner(s): Local: RPTV; A2Z (until Finals Game 5); PBA Rush (HD); International: Pilipinas Live; Online: Pilipinas Live

Finals
- Champions: San Miguel Beermen
- Runners-up: Magnolia Chicken Timplados Hotshots

Awards
- Best Player: CJ Perez (San Miguel Beermen)
- Best Import: Johnathan Williams (Phoenix Super LPG Fuel Masters)
- Finals MVP: CJ Perez (San Miguel Beermen)

PBA Commissioner's Cup chronology
- < 2022–23 2024–25 >

PBA conference chronology
- < 2023 Governors' 2024 Philippine >

The 2023–24 PBA Commissioner's Cup, also known as the 2023–24 Honda PBA Commissioner's Cup for sponsorship reasons, was the first conference of the 2023–24 PBA season of the Philippine Basketball Association (PBA). The 21st edition of the Commissioner's Cup started on November 5, 2023, and ended on February 14, 2024. The tournament allowed teams to hire foreign players or imports with a height limit of 6 feet 9 inches (2.06 m).

The opening was originally scheduled on October 15, but was moved three weeks past the original date to give players that participated in the 2023 FIBA Basketball World Cup and the 2022 Asian Games time to rest.

Guest team and previous Commissioner's Cup runner-up Bay Area Dragons were supposed to compete during the conference, but the team was disbanded by their owners, the East Asia Super League, prior to the start of the conference.

== Format ==
- All participating teams played in a single round-robin elimination, with each team playing 11 games throughout the duration of the conference.
- Teams were ranked by win-loss records with the top eight teams advancing to the playoffs. Any ties were broken using tiebreaker criteria.
  - If there is a tie for 8th place, a one-game playoff is instead used to determine which team gets the final playoff spot.
- The playoff formats were as follows:
  - Quarterfinals (twice-to-beat for top four):
    - Matches: 1st vs. 8th, 2nd vs. 7th, 3rd vs. 6th, 4th vs. 5th
  - Semifinals (best-of-five series):
    - Matches: 1st/8th vs. 4th/5th; 2nd/7th vs. 3rd/6th
  - Finals (best-of-seven series)

== Elimination round ==
=== Team standings ===
Pos	Team	W	L	PCT	GB	Qualification
1	Magnolia Chicken Timplados Hotshots	9	2	.818	—	Twice-to-beat in quarterfinals
2	San Miguel Beermen	8	3	.727 (Note: Head-to-head quotient: San Miguel 1.17, Barangay Ginebra 0.99, Phoenix Super LPG 0.98, Meralco 0.89)	1	Twice-to-beat in quarterfinals
3	Barangay Ginebra San Miguel	8	3	.727	1	Twice-to-beat in quarterfinals
4	Phoenix Super LPG Fuel Masters	8	3	.727	1	Twice-to-beat in quarterfinals
5	Meralco Bolts	8	3	.727	1	Twice-to-win in quarterfinals
6	NorthPort Batang Pier	6	5	.545 (Note: Head-to-head record: NorthPort 1–0 Rain or Shine)	3	Twice-to-win in quarterfinals
7	Rain or Shine Elasto Painters	6	5	.545	3	Twice-to-win in quarterfinals
8	TNT Tropang Giga	5	6	.455	4	Twice-to-win in quarterfinals
9	NLEX Road Warriors	4	7	.364	5	
10	Terrafirma Dyip	2	9	.182	7	
11	Blackwater Bossing	1	10	.091 (Note: Head-to-head record: Blackwater 1–0 Converge)	8	
12	Converge FiberXers	1	10	.091	8	

Source: PBA.ph
Rules for classification: 1) winning percentage; 2) if two teams are tied, head-to-head record; if three or more teams are tied, head-to-head goal average (quotient); if tied for 8th, one-game playoff; 3) overall quotient; 4) coin toss

=== Results table ===
Team	Game										
Team	1	2	3	4	5	6	7	8	9	10	11
Barangay Ginebra (BGSM)	CON; 100–86	MAG; 91–93	ROS; 107–102	BWB; 90–87	TER; 110–99	PHX; 77–82	SMB; 82–95	MER; 110–96	TNT; 86–78	NP; 103–93	NLEX; 103–99
Blackwater (BWB)	CON; 103–84	MER; 84–91	TER; 87–97	PHX; 106–111	BGSM; 87–90	ROS; 110–115	MAG; 84–105	TNT; 96–105	NLEX; 97–104	NP; 89–106	SMB; 117–125
Converge (CON)	BWB; 84–103	TNT; 98–101*	BGSM; 86–100	SMB; 96–105	PHX; 98–99	NP; 95–111	TER; 103–94*	MER; 99–105	MAG; 80–88	NLEX; 103–107	ROS; 111–112
Magnolia (MAG)	TNT; 110–102	PHX; 107–92	NP; 112–74	BGSM; 93–91	NLEX; 99–72	BWB; 105–84	SMB; 94–90	ROS; 110–113	TER; 104–91	CON; 88–80	MER; 80–85
Meralco (MER)	ROS; 107–102	BWB; 91–84	SMB; 83–93	TNT; 109–95	NLEX; 96–94	NP; 125–99	CON; 105–99	BGSM; 96–110	MAG; 85–80	PHX; 83–93	TER; 109–102
NLEX	PHX; 101–113	SMB; 117–113*	TER; 112–113	NP; 112–104	MAG; 72–99	MER; 94–96	ROS; 101–113	TNT; 97–113	BWB; 104–97	CON; 107–103	BGSM; 99–103
NorthPort (NP)	TER; 108–103	ROS; 113–103	MAG; 74–112	NLEX; 104–112	TNT; 128–123*	CON; 111–95	SMB; 115–101	MER; 99–125	PHX; 104–113	BWB; 106–89	BGSM; 93–103
Phoenix Super LPG (PHX)	NLEX; 113–101	MAG; 92–107	ROS; 99–98	BWB; 111–106	TER; 103–84	CON; 99–98	BGSM; 82–77	NP; 113–104	SMB; 96–117	MER; 93–83	TNT; 96–116
Rain or Shine (ROS)	MER; 102–107	NP; 103–113	PHX; 98–99	BGSM; 102–107	SMB; 110–115	BWB; 115–110	NLEX; 113–101	MAG; 113–110	TER; 116–105	TNT; 119–112	CON; 112–111
San Miguel (SMB)	NLEX; 113–117*	MER; 93–83	CON; 105–96	ROS; 115–110	NP; 101–115	MAG; 90–94	BGSM; 95–82	TNT; 98–93	PHX; 117–96	TER; 132–110	BWB; 125–117
Terrafirma (TER)	NP; 103–108	BWB; 97–87	NLEX; 113–112	TNT; 93–133	PHX; 84–103	BGSM; 99–110	CON; 94–103*	MAG; 91–104	ROS; 105–116	SMB; 110–132	MER; 102–109
TNT	MAG; 102–110	CON; 101–98*	TER; 133–93	MER; 95–109	NP; 123–128*	NLEX; 113–97	BWB; 105–96	SMB; 93–98	BGSM; 78–86	ROS; 112–119	PHX; 116–96

Updated to match(es) played on unknown. Source: PBA.ph results
Legend: Blue = win; Red = loss; Matches with lighter background shading were decided after overtime. (*) Number of asterisks denotes number of overtime periods

== Bracket ==
Quarterfinals (Top 4 twice-to-beat)
1	Magnolia	109
8	TNT	94
4	Phoenix Super LPG	107	88
5	Meralco	116***	84
2	San Miguel	127
7	Rain or Shine	122
3	Barangay Ginebra	106
6	NorthPort	93

Semifinals (Best-of-5)
1	Magnolia	3
4	Phoenix Super LPG	1
2	San Miguel	3
3	Barangay Ginebra	0

Finals (Best-of-7)
1	Magnolia	2
2	San Miguel	4

***Game went into triple overtime

== Quarterfinals ==
All match-ups have the higher-seeded team having the twice-to-beat advantage, where they have to be beaten twice, and their opponents just once, to advance.

=== (1) Magnolia vs. (8) TNT ===
A2Z

January 17
8:00 pm

Box score

Magnolia Chicken Timplados Hotshots 109, TNT Tropang Giga 94
Scoring by quarter: 21–23, 29–21, 27–25, 32–25
Pts: Bey 41; Rebs: Bey 13; Asts: Jalalon 5	Pts: Hollis-Jefferson 27; Rebs: Hollis-Jefferson 9 Asts: Hollis-Jefferson 11
Magnolia wins series in one game

PhilSports Arena, Pasig
Referees: Nol Quilinguen, Rommel Gruta, Albert Nubla, Irewin Traballo

=== (2) San Miguel vs. (7) Rain or Shine ===
A2Z

January 19
4:00 pm

Box score

San Miguel Beermen 127, Rain or Shine Elasto Painters 122
Scoring by quarter: 36–32, 31–35, 42–22, 18–33
Pts: Boatwright 41; Rebs: Fajardo 13; Asts: Perez 7	Pts: Treadwell 22; Rebs: Treadwell 10; Asts: Treadwell 8
San Miguel wins series in one game

PhilSports Arena, Pasig
Referees: Peter Balao, Rommel Gruta, Jeffrey Tantay, Albert Nubla

=== (3) Barangay Ginebra vs. (6) NorthPort ===
A2Z

January 19
8:00 pm

Box score

Barangay Ginebra San Miguel 106, NorthPort Batang Pier 93
Scoring by quarter: 25–22, 30–13, 21–28, 30–30
Pts: Bishop 31; Rebs: Bishop 15; Asts: Thompson 10	Pts: Calma, Munzon 19; Rebs: Jois 14; Asts: Jois 12
Barangay Ginebra wins series in one game

PhilSports Arena, Pasig
Referees: Nol Quilinguen, Sherwin Pineda, Mike Flordeliza, Jerry Narandan

=== (4) Phoenix Super LPG vs. (5) Meralco ===
A2Z

January 17
4:00 pm

Box score

Phoenix Super LPG Fuel Masters 107, Meralco Bolts 116 (3OT)
Scoring by quarter: 21–13, 26–26, 15–14, 22–31, Overtime: 11–11, 8–8, 4–13
Pts: Williams 24; Rebs: Williams 24; Asts: Williams 6	Pts: Hodge 20; Rebs: Miller 20; Asts: Newsome, Quinto 4

PhilSports Arena, Pasig
Referees: Sherwin Pineda, Peter Balao, Bing Oliva, Julius Medillo

A2Z, CNN Philippines

January 21
6:30 pm

Box score

Phoenix Super LPG Fuel Masters 88, Meralco Bolts 84
Scoring by quarter: 30–22, 25–21, 22–19, 11–22
Pts: Williams 21; Rebs: Williams 16; Asts: Mocon 4	Pts: three players 15; Rebs: Miller 12; Asts: Miller, Newsome 6
Phoenix Super LPG wins series in two games

SM Mall of Asia Arena, Pasay
Referees: Nol Quilinguen, Rommel Gruta, Jerry Narandan, Jeffrey Tantay

== Semifinals ==
All match-ups are best-of-five playoffs.

=== (1) Magnolia vs. (4) Phoenix Super LPG ===
A2Z

January 24
4:00 pm

Box score

Magnolia Chicken Timplados Hotshots 82, Phoenix Super LPG Fuel Masters 79
Scoring by quarter: 18–16, 20–25, 23–19, 21–19
Pts: Bey 23; Rebs: Bey 10; Asts: Jalalon 7	Pts: Perkins 25; Rebs: Williams 18; Asts: Williams 7

Smart Araneta Coliseum, Quezon City
Referees: Peter Balao, Sherwin Pineda, Bing Oliva, Irewin Traballo

A2Z

January 26
8:00 pm

Box score

Magnolia Chicken Timplados Hotshots 82, Phoenix Super LPG Fuel Masters 78
Scoring by quarter: 30–14, 13–20, 19–26, 20–18
Pts: Bey 25; Rebs: Bey 12; Asts: Barroca 5	Pts: Williams 27; Rebs: Williams 16; Asts: Williams 5

SM Mall of Asia Arena, Pasay
Referees: Nol Quilinguen, Rommel Gruta, Albert Nubla, James Paez

A2Z, CNN Philippines

January 28
3:00 pm

Box score

Magnolia Chicken Timplados Hotshots 85, Phoenix Super LPG Fuel Masters 103
Scoring by quarter: 31–17, 20–21, 16–33, 18–32
Pts: Bey 18; Rebs: Bey 12; Asts: Jalalon 9	Pts: Williams 19; Rebs: Williams 15; Asts: Williams 4

SM Mall of Asia Arena, Pasay
Attendance: 15,126
Referees: Peter Balao, Rommel Gruta, Mike Flordeliza, Jeffrey Tantay

A2Z

January 31
8:00 pm

Box score

Magnolia Chicken Timplados Hotshots 89, Phoenix Super LPG Fuel Masters 79
Scoring by quarter: 29–16, 20–22, 21–15, 19–26
Pts: Barroca 21; Rebs: Bey 20; Asts: Lee 6	Pts: Williams 17; Rebs: Williams 17; Asts: Williams 5
Magnolia wins series, 3–1

SM Mall of Asia Arena, Pasay
Referees: Nol Quilinguen, Sherwin Pineda, Albert Nubla, Julius Medillo

=== (2) San Miguel vs. (3) Barangay Ginebra ===
A2Z

January 24
8:00 pm

Box score

San Miguel Beermen 92, Barangay Ginebra San Miguel 90
Scoring by quarter: 28–20, 19–27, 26–26, 19–17
Pts: Perez 26; Rebs: Boatwright 12; Asts: Ross 6	Pts: Standhardinger 21; Rebs: Bishop, Standhardinger 11; Asts: Thompson 8

Smart Araneta Coliseum, Quezon City
Referees: Nol Quilinguen, Rommel Gruta, Mike Flordeliza, Kenny Hallig

A2Z

January 26
4:00 pm

Box score

San Miguel Beermen 106, Barangay Ginebra San Miguel 96
Scoring by quarter: 23–21, 20–25, 33–28, 30–22
Pts: Boatwright 38; Rebs: Fajardo 14; Asts: Ross 5	Pts: Malonzo 27; Rebs: Standhardinger 14; Asts: Malonzo 4

SM Mall of Asia Arena, Pasay
Referees: Peter Balao, Sherwin Pineda, Jerry Narandan, Joel Baldago

A2Z, CNN Philippines

January 28
6:30 pm

Box score

San Miguel Beermen 94, Barangay Ginebra San Miguel 91
Scoring by quarter: 21–18, 22–24, 32–27, 19–22
Pts: Boatwright 26; Rebs: Boatwright 13; Asts: Perez 4	Pts: Bishop 25; Rebs: Thompson 9 Asts: Thompson 5
San Miguel wins series, 3–0

SM Mall of Asia Arena, Pasay
Attendance: 15,126
Referees: Nol Quilinguen, Sherwin Pineda, Mardy Montoya, Niño Cortez

== Finals ==
RPTV

February 2
7:30 pm

Box score

Magnolia Chicken Timplados Hotshots 95, San Miguel Beermen 103

SM Mall of Asia Arena, Pasay

RPTV

February 4
6:15 pm

Box score

Magnolia Chicken Timplados Hotshots 85, San Miguel Beermen 109

SM Mall of Asia Arena, Pasay

RPTV

February 7
7:30 pm

Box score

Magnolia Chicken Timplados Hotshots 88, San Miguel Beermen 80

Araneta Coliseum, Quezon City

RPTV

February 9
7:30 pm

Box score

Magnolia Chicken Timplados Hotshots 96, San Miguel Beermen 85

Araneta Coliseum, Quezon City

RPTV

February 11
6:15 pm

Box score

Magnolia Chicken Timplados Hotshots 98, San Miguel Beermen 108

Araneta Coliseum, Quezon City

RPTV

February 14
7:30 pm

Box score

Magnolia Chicken Timplados Hotshots 102, San Miguel Beermen 104
San Miguel wins series, 4–2

Araneta Coliseum, Quezon City

== Imports ==
The following is the list of imports, which had played for their respective teams at least once, with the returning imports in italics. Highlighted are the imports who stayed with their respective teams for the whole conference.

Team	Name	Debuted	Last game	Record
Barangay Ginebra San Miguel	(Panama) Tony Bishop	November 17, 2023 (vs. Converge)	January 28, 2024 (vs. San Miguel)	9–6
Blackwater Bossing	(Puerto Rico) Chris Ortiz	November 8, 2023 (vs. Converge)	January 12, 2024 (vs. San Miguel)	1–10
Converge FiberXers	(New Zealand) Tom Vodanovich	November 8, 2023 (vs. Blackwater)	December 2, 2023 (vs. Phoenix Super LPG)	0–5
Converge FiberXers	(United States) Jamil Wilson	December 6, 2023 (vs. NorthPort)	January 14, 2024 (vs. Rain or Shine)	1–5
Magnolia Chicken Timplados Hotshots	(United States) Tyler Bey	November 5, 2023 (vs. TNT)	February 14, 2024 (vs. San Miguel)	15–7
Meralco Bolts	(Nigeria) Suleiman Braimoh	November 8, 2023 (vs. Rain or Shine)	December 3, 2023 (vs. NLEX)	4–1
Meralco Bolts	(United States) Zach Lofton	December 10, 2023 (vs. NorthPort)	December 22, 2023 (vs. Barangay Ginebra)	2–1
Meralco Bolts	(United States) Shonn Miller	January 6, 2024 (vs. Magnolia)	January 21, 2024 (vs. Phoenix Super LPG)	3–2
NLEX Road Warriors	(United States) Thomas Robinson	November 10, 2023 (vs. Phoenix Super LPG)	November 22, 2023 (vs. NorthPort)	2–2
NLEX Road Warriors	(United States) Stokley Chaffee Jr.	December 1, 2023 (vs. Magnolia)	December 22, 2023 (vs. Blackwater)	1–4
NLEX Road Warriors	(United States) DeAndre Williams-Baldwin	January 10, 2024 (vs. Converge)	January 13, 2024 (vs. Barangay Ginebra)	1–1
NorthPort Batang Pier	(Australia) Venky Jois	November 10, 2023 (vs. Terrafirma)	January 19, 2024 (vs. Barangay Ginebra)	5–6
NorthPort Batang Pier	No import	December 8, 2023 (vs. San Miguel)		1–0
Phoenix Super LPG Fuel Masters	(United States) Johnathan Williams	November 10, 2023 (vs. NLEX)	January 31, 2024 (vs. Magnolia)	10–7
Rain or Shine Elasto Painters	(United States) DaJuan Summers	November 8, 2023 (vs. Meralco)	November 24, 2023 (vs. Barangay Ginebra)	0–4
Rain or Shine Elasto Painters	(United States) Demetrius Treadwell	November 29, 2023 (vs. San Miguel)	January 19, 2024 (vs. San Miguel)	6–2
San Miguel Beermen	(United States Virgin Islands) Ivan Aska	November 15, 2023 (vs. NLEX)	December 17, 2023 (vs. TNT)	5–3
San Miguel Beermen	(United States) Bennie Boatwright	December 25, 2023 (vs. Phoenix Super LPG)	February 14, 2024 (vs. Magnolia)	11–2
Terrafirma Dyip	(Belgium) Thomas De Thaey	November 10, 2023 (vs. NorthPort)	January 12, 2024 (vs. Meralco)	2–8
Terrafirma Dyip	No import	November 22, 2023 (vs. TNT)		0–1
TNT Tropang Giga	(United States) Quincy Miller	November 5, 2023 (vs. Magnolia)		0–1
TNT Tropang Giga	(Jordan) Rondae Hollis-Jefferson	November 11, 2023 (vs. Converge)	December 17, 2023 (vs. San Miguel)	4–3
TNT Tropang Giga	No import	December 25, 2023 (vs. Barangay Ginebra)		0–1
TNT Tropang Giga	(United States) Rahlir Hollis-Jefferson	January 5, 2024 (vs. Rain or Shine)	January 17, 2024 (vs. Magnolia)	1–2

== Awards ==
=== Players of the Week ===
Week	Player	Ref.
November 8–12	Arvin Tolentino (NorthPort Batang Pier)	
November 15–19	Javi Gómez de Liaño (Terrafirma Dyip)	
November 22–26	Maverick Ahanmisi (Barangay Ginebra San Miguel)	
November 29 – December 3	Jason Perkins (Phoenix Super LPG Fuel Masters)	
December 6–10	Arvin Tolentino (NorthPort Batang Pier)	
December 13–17	Chris Ross (San Miguel Beermen)	
December 20–25	Scottie Thompson (Barangay Ginebra San Miguel)	
January 5–7	Andrei Caracut (Rain or Shine Elasto Painters)	
January 10–14	Kim Aurin (TNT Tropang Giga)	
January 17–21	Jason Perkins (Phoenix Super LPG Fuel Masters)	
January 24–28	June Mar Fajardo (San Miguel Beermen)	

== Statistics ==
=== Individual statistical leaders ===
==== Local players ====
Category	Player	Team	Statistic
Points per game	Arvin Tolentino	NorthPort Batang Pier	22.4
Rebounds per game	June Mar Fajardo	San Miguel Beermen	11.2
Assists per game	Robert Bolick	NLEX Road Warriors	10.3
Steals per game	JL delos Santos	Converge FiberXers	2.6
Blocks per game	June Mar Fajardo	San Miguel Beermen	2.6
Turnovers per game	Robert Bolick	NLEX Road Warriors	3.5
Fouls per game	Brandon Ganuelas-Rosser	NLEX Road Warriors	4.6
Minutes per game	Christian Standhardinger	Barangay Ginebra San Miguel	38.5
FG%	Jewel Ponferada	TNT Tropang Giga	68.8%
FT%	Rey Nambatac	Rain or Shine Elasto Painters	96.2%
3FG%	Kemark Cariño	Terrafirma Dyip	58.8%
Double-doubles	June Mar Fajardo	San Miguel Beermen	11

==== Import players ====
Category	Player	Team	Statistic
Points per game	Bennie Boatwright	San Miguel Beermen	40.3
Rebounds per game	Demetrius Treadwell	Rain or Shine Elasto Painters	18.1
Assists per game	Demetrius Treadwell	Rain or Shine Elasto Painters	5.9
Steals per game	Tony Bishop	Barangay Ginebra San Miguel	2.5
Blocks per game	Venky Jois	NorthPort Batang Pier	2.1
Turnovers per game	Venky Jois	NorthPort Batang Pier	4.2
Fouls per game	Tony Bishop	Barangay Ginebra San Miguel	3.2
Minutes per game	Jamil Wilson	Converge FiberXers	45.8
FG%	Johnathan Williams	Phoenix Super LPG Fuel Masters	61.1%
FT%	Jamil Wilson	Converge FiberXers	88.2%
3FG%	Bennie Boatwright	San Miguel Beermen	42.9%
Double-doubles	Johnathan Williams	Phoenix Super LPG Fuel Masters	17
Double-doubles	Tyler Bey	Magnolia Chicken Timplados Hotshots	17
Triple-doubles	Venky Jois	NorthPort Batang Pier	1

=== Individual game highs ===
==== Local players ====
Category	Player	Team	Statistic
Points	Calvin Oftana	TNT Tropang Giga	37
Rebounds	Christian Standhardinger	Barangay Ginebra San Miguel	16
Rebounds	June Mar Fajardo	San Miguel Beermen	16
Assists	Robert Bolick	NLEX Road Warriors	15
Steals	Jio Jalalon	Magnolia Chicken Timplados Hotshots	6
Blocks	June Mar Fajardo	San Miguel Beermen	6
Three point field goals	Jericho Cruz	San Miguel Beermen	8

==== Import players ====
Category	Player	Team	Statistic
Points	Zach Lofton	Meralco Bolts	54
Rebounds	Demetrius Treadwell	Rain or Shine Elasto Painters	24
Rebounds	Johnathan Williams	Phoenix Super LPG Fuel Masters	24
Assists	Venky Jois	NorthPort Batang Pier	12
Steals	Tony Bishop	Barangay Ginebra San Miguel	8
Blocks	Venky Jois (thrice)	NorthPort Batang Pier	4
Three point field goals	Zach Lofton	Meralco Bolts	9

=== Team statistical leaders ===
Category	Team	Statistic
Points per game	Rain or Shine Elasto Painters	109.4
Rebounds per game	Magnolia Chicken Timplados Hotshots	48.7
Assists per game	Barangay Ginebra San Miguel	25.6
Steals per game	NorthPort Batang Pier	10.3
Blocks per game	TNT Tropang Giga	3.7
Turnovers per game	Phoenix Super LPG Fuel Masters	16.9
Fouls per game	Meralco Bolts	25.5
FG%	San Miguel Beermen	47.6%
FT%	Terrafirma Dyip	76.3%
3FG%	TNT Tropang Giga	36.1%

== Final rankings ==
Pos	Team	Pld	W	L	Best finish
1	San Miguel Beermen (C)	21	16	5	Champion
2	Magnolia Chicken Timplados Hotshots	22	15	7	Runner-up
3	Barangay Ginebra San Miguel	15	9	6	Semifinalist
4	Phoenix Fuel Masters	17	10	7	Semifinalist
5	Meralco Bolts	13	9	4	Quarterfinalist
6	NorthPort Batang Pier	12	6	6	Quarterfinalist
7	Rain or Shine Elasto Painters	12	6	6	Quarterfinalist
8	TNT Tropang Giga	12	5	7	Quarterfinalist
9	NLEX Road Warriors	11	4	7	Elimination round
10	Terrafirma Dyip	11	2	9	Elimination round
11	Blackwater Bossing	11	1	10	Elimination round
12	Converge FiberXers	11	1	10	Elimination round

Rules for classification: 1) finals result, 2) elimination round seed of semifinalists, 3) elimination round seed of quarterfinalists, 4) elimination round finish
(C) Champions
