= Javi Gómez de Liaño =

Filipino basketball player (born 1998)

No. 2 – Magnolia Chicken Timplados Hotshots
- Position: Small forward / shooting guard
- League: PBA

Personal information
- Born: July 27, 1998 (age 28) Mandaluyong, Philippines
- Listed height: 6 ft 3 in (1.91 m)
- Listed weight: 193 lb (88 kg)

Career information
- High school: UPIS (Quezon City)
- College: UP (2016–2019)
- PBA draft: 2022: 1st round, 8th overall pick
- Drafted by: Barangay Ginebra San Miguel
- Playing career: 2021–present

Career history
- 2021–2022: Ibaraki Robots
- 2022–2024: Terrafirma Dyip
- 2024–2025: Anyang Jung Kwan Jang Red Boosters
- 2025–present: Magnolia Chicken Timplados Hotshots

Javier Joaquin Sison Gómez de Liaño (born July 27, 1998), also known as Javi GDL, is a Filipino professional basketball player for the Magnolia Chicken Timplados Hotshots of the Philippine Basketball Association (PBA). Gómez de Liaño played for the University of the Philippines Fighting Maroons of the UAAP during his collegiate career. He then professionally played in Japan before returning to the Philippines to play in the PBA. He plays the small forward position.

== Early life and high school career ==
Gómez de Liaño is the second of six siblings. He has an older brother, Joe. He and his brothers grew up together playing basketball in their village court. Their father encouraged them to become swimmers, but soon learned that they wanted to become basketball players.

Gómez de Liaño and his younger brother Juan both attended Ateneo's grade school. They first tried out for Ateneo's high school varsity, but were both cut. They then transferred to PAREF Northfield, a school not known for its basketball program. When he was 14 years old, Javi was noticed by UPIS head coach Allan Gregorio as a shy 6'1" kid with no experience, but lots of potential. Gregorio then brought him and his brothers to UPIS, where they got scholarships.

In his first year with UPIS, Gómez de Liaño finished in the top seven in the Mythical Five race. In his final season with UPIS, he made the Mythical Five. He also put up a career-high 37 points on a 17-of-25 clip from the field, in addition to 11 rebounds, four assists and two blocks in his final game with the Junior Maroons. However, UPIS never made it to the semifinals.

== College career ==
Gómez de Liaño initially wanted to play for the UST Growling Tigers. He ultimately decided to commit to the UP Fighting Maroons. In his first game against the Tigers, he had 12 points in 15 minutes, but the Tigers gave them their third loss in three games to start the season. In the second round, against the Adamson Falcons, he put up 13 points (including a clutch three-pointer) on perfect 5-of-5 shooting, six rebounds, and two steals as UP won its second straight game. Their streak was snapped by the De La Salle Green Archers despite his 11 points. UP finished with a 5–9 record, their best in a long while.

In the offseason, Gómez de Liaño's brother Juan also committed to UP. In a win over the Green Archers, the brothers combined for 14 first half points, with both finishing with a combined 20 points. In a loss to the NU Bulldogs, he had ten points, eight rebounds, and six assists. He then had a double-double of 17 points and 11 rebounds in a loss to the UE Red Warriors. In the final game of the season, he combined his 17 points with Juan's 22 points for 39 points as UP routed the Bulldogs. Unfortunately, the FEU Tamaraws eliminated the Maroons when they won over Adamson. He did get to play in UP's first 3x3 team along with his brother Juan, Jun Manzo, and Gelo Vito during Season 80.

Against FEU, Gómez de Liaño recorded 15 points, three rebounds, and a block in 24 minutes in the win. This was their first win after losing their first two games. He then had 19 points (which was his career-high in college at the time) to go with eight rebounds and four rebounds in a win over the Bulldogs. He ended the first round of eliminations with 12 points in a loss to UST. In a loss to the Ateneo Blue Eagles, he was ejected for committing two technical fouls. As a result, he was suspended the next game. Against the Green Archers, he had 19 points on 7-of-11 shooting while providing key three pointers that allowed UP to pull away from DLSU and claim the third seed in the Final Four. This was UP's first appearance in the Final Four in 21 years. The Maroons went all the way to the Finals, where they lost to the Blue Eagles. He played in the 3x3 event once again this time with Juan, Kobe Paras, and Ricci Rivero.

During the offseason, Gómez de Liaño worked on his physical conditioning. The improved conditioning showed in UP's Season 82 debut, as he had a team and college career-high 22 points on an efficient 10-of-16 shooting clip to go along with six rebounds and three steals in a win over FEU. He then recorded 15 points and eight rebounds in a loss to UST. In a close game against Adamson, he made a triple off a pass from Paras to send the game into overtime, where UP eventually prevailed. Against NU, he had 17 points on five out of seven threes. He matched that point total again in another rematch with NU and got another win. In a loss to Ateneo, he recorded 14 points. The Maroons were swept that season in the semifinals by the Tigers. He finished the season as one of UP's leading scorers, averaging 10.5 points per game on 47.11% shooting from the field, and 35-percent from downtown.

In 2020, Gómez de Liaño announced that he would skip Season 83. He initially planned to postpone his final playing year in the UAAP to play in the MPBL for the Nueva Ecija Rice Vanguards, after which he would stay with UP for Season 84. The COVID-19 pandemic however derailed those plans. In 2021, he graduated with a degree in Physical Education. After graduating, he would go on to play in the B.League, forgoing his final year with UP. The year after he left, UP went on to win its first championship in 36 years.

== Amateur career ==
In 2018, Gómez de Liaño played for Marinerong Pilipino in the PBA D-League. He scored 27 points to go with five rebounds in a win over the AMA Online Education Titans during that year's PBA D-League Foundation Cup. He played for them again in 2020, this time with his brother Juan. In a 36-point rout of the CEU Scorpions, he scored 18 points and five rebounds while Juan scored 21 points, seven rebounds, and four assists.

In 2019, it was announced that both Javi and Juan Gómez de Liaño joined the Mighty Sports team for the 31st Dubai International Basketball Tournament. Mighty Sports became the first team not from the Middle East to win the tournament.

== Professional career ==
=== Ibaraki Robots (2021–2022) ===
On July 5, 2021, Gómez de Liaño signed with the Ibaraki Robots of the Japanese B.League on a one-year contract under the "Asian Quota" rule. He missed the first nine games of the season as he had to wait for clearance to play in Japan. Once there however, he had little playing time with the Robots, averaging just under 10 minutes and was not even used in some of their 53 games. His season high was 17 points to go with five rebounds and three assists against Levanga Hokkaido. He is the first Filipino player to be invited for the 2021 Asia All Stars 3-point competition.

=== Terrafirma Dyip (2022–2024) ===
==== 2022–23 season ====
On May 7, 2022, Gómez de Liaño applied for the Season 47 draft. He was drafted eighth overall by Barangay Ginebra, his favorite team growing up. Two days later, he, along with guard Brian Enriquez, was then traded to the Terrafirma Dyip for the 2nd overall pick Jeremiah Gray. There, he would get to play with his former UP assistant coach Alex Cabagnot and former Gilas teammate Isaac Go while helping Terrafirma develop a winning culture. He signed a two-year deal with the team shortly after the trade.

In his first conference with Terrafirma, Gómez de Liaño struggled. In his debut, he only had four points, but did contribute nine rebounds and five assists in a loss to the NLEX Road Warriors. Despite his struggles, he was able to produce 19 points in a loss to the San Miguel Beermen. In the 2022–23 Commissioner's Cup, he contributed 11 points and six rebounds as he stepped up for the injured Andreas Cahilig in a loss to the Meralco Bolts. Against the Beermen, he had 17 points. During the 2023 PBA All-Star Weekend, he competed in the Team Greats vs. Team Stalwarts game, where he led Team Greats to victory with his 30 points.

==== 2023–24 season ====
Gómez de Liaño helped Terrafirma get its first win of the season with 17 points in 31 minutes off the bench against the Blackwater Bossing. He then scored a career-high 31 points on 10-of-15 shooting from the field in a win over the NLEX Road Warriors. For his performance, he was awarded Player of the Week. In a loss to Ginebra, he led the team with 22 points. He and his rookie teammate Stephen Holt got to play against each other in the Greats vs. Stalwarts game during the 2024 All-Star Weekend.

In a 2024 Philippine Cup upset win over Ginebra, Gómez de Liaño scored 22 points to go with his six rebounds. He then scored 21 points in a loss to San Miguel. Against the Rain or Shine Elasto Painters, he had a double-double of 18 points and 10 rebounds. In a do-or-die game for the last playoff spot against NorthPort, he scored 10 of his 21 points in the fourth quarter as he helped Terrafirma get into the playoffs for the first time since the 2016 Governors' Cup. In the quarterfinals, Terrafirma forced a winner-take-all game as he put up a near triple-double of 15 points, 10 rebounds, and eight assists. The Beermen bounced back the following game and won 110–91 to end Terrafirma's season.

=== Anyang Jung Kwan Jang Red Boosters (2024–2025) ===
On June 7, 2024, Gómez de Liaño announced that he would be leaving the PBA and Terrafirma to play for the Anyang Jung Kwan Jang Red Boosters in the Korean Basketball League. There he would get to play against his brother Juan.

In July 2025, he joined the Philippine contingent competing in the 2025 William Jones Cup in Taiwan with Strong Group. They became the champions of that tournament.

=== Magnolia Chicken Timplados Hotshots (2025–present) ===
On August 22, 2025, Gómez de Liaño's playing rights in the PBA was traded to the Magnolia Hotshots Pambansang Manok for Jerrick Ahanmisi and a draft pick. On August 30, he signed a three-year contract with Magnolia, making his return in the PBA official.

== Professional career statistics ==
=== B.League ===
Legend
GP	Games played	MPG	Minutes per game
FG%	Field-goal percentage	3P%	3-point field-goal percentage	FT%	Free-throw percentage
RPG	Rebounds per game	APG	Assists per game	SPG	Steals per game
BPG	Blocks per game	PPG	Points per game	**Bold**	Career high

==== Season-by-season averages ====
Year	Team	GP	MPG	FG%	3P%	FT%	RPG	APG	SPG	BPG	PPG
2021–22	Ibaraki	35	9.4	.383	.362	.636	1.1	.4	.2	.1	3.1
Career		35	9.4	.383	.362	.636	1.1	.4	.2	.1	3.1

=== PBA ===
Legend
GP	Games played	MPG	Minutes per game	FG%	Field-goal percentage
3FG%	3-point field-goal percentage	4P%	4-point field-goal percentage	FT%	Free-throw percentage
RPG	Rebounds per game	APG	Assists per game	SPG	Steals per game
BPG	Blocks per game	PPG	Points per game	**127**	Career high

As of the end of 2025–26 season

==== Season-by-season averages ====
Year	Team	GP	MPG	FG%	3P%	4P%	FT%	RPG	APG	SPG	BPG	PPG
2022–23	Terrafirma	33	16.3	.458	.297	—	**.765**	2.9	1.2	.4	.2	6.0
2023–24	Terrafirma	25	**30.6**	**.524**	**.385**	—	.753	**5.7**	**2.2**	**1.3**	**.6**	**16.4**
2025–26	Magnolia	**36**	16.4	.361	.325	.244	.720	2.5	1.0	.3	.3	6.5
Career		94	22.5	.456	.343	.244	.750	3.5	1.4	.6	.3	8.9

== National team career ==
Gómez de Liaño tried out for the national U-16 team, but was cut. He and his brother Juan also tried out for the national U-18 team, but both were cut. In 2020, he almost made the Gilas roster for the first window of the 2021 FIBA Asia Cup qualifiers, but didn't make the cut because the coaches told him "he was overweight and wouldn't fit the system". During the lockdowns, he used those comments as motivation to lose 40 pounds, and improve his diet. He finally made it unto a Gilas roster for the second window of the 2021 FIBA Asia Cup qualifiers. In his debut, he had nine points in a win over Thailand. In their rematch, he scored 19 points while making all four of his threes in another win.

In 2021, Gómez de Liaño made the roster for a FIBA Asia Cup qualifying game against South Korea, but he didn't play in that game. He then replaced Will Navarro in the lineup against Indonesia and got to play in that game. He was then cut from the training pool for the 2020 Olympic Qualifying Tournament in Belgrade, Serbia due to a strained quad.

== Personal life ==
Gómez de Liaño, along with his brother Juan, was a product endorser for Milo, McDonald's Philippines, and Smart Communications. In 2020, during the COVID-19 pandemic, he launched his own business, Cole's Sporting Business. He named it after his girlfriend and business partner Einica Nicole Buhain. Together, they sold gym equipment, supplements and apparel.

His older brother, Joe, played for the Marikina Shoemasters of Maharlika Pilipinas Basketball League and was drafted 59th overall by the Phoenix Super LPG Fuel Masters during the PBA season 48 draft.
