= 2024 PBA All-Star Weekend =

32nd PBA All-Star Weekend

| Team Japeth | Team Mark |
|---|---|
| 140 | 140 |
| | 1 | 2 | 3 | 4 | Total |
|---|---|---|---|---|---|
| Team Japeth | 46 | 33 | 32 | 29 | 140 |
| Team Mark | 20 | 48 | 36 | 36 | 140 |
- Date: March 23–24, 2024
- Venue: La Salle Coliseum, Bacolod, Negros Occidental
- MVP: Japeth Aguilar and Robert Bolick
- Network: RPTV, PBA Rush, Pilipinas Live, SMART Livestream and Radyo Pilipinas 2 918khz

The 2024 PBA All-Star Weekend was the annual all-star weekend of the Philippine Basketball Association (PBA)'s 2023–24 season. Highlighting the weekend was the All-Star Game between Team Mark and Team Japeth.

== Saturday events ==
=== Obstacle Challenge ===
This edition was exclusive for big men (power forwards and centers).

Contestants
| Pos. | Player | Team | Height | Weight |
|---|---|---|---|---|
| F | Ralph Cu^{REP1} | Barangay Ginebra San Miguel | 6–4 | 210 |
| C | Clifford Jopia | Blackwater Bossing | 6–8 | 220 |
| C | Justin Arana | Converge FiberXers | 6–7 | 231 |
| C | James Laput | Magnolia Chicken Timplados Hotshots | 6–10 | 245 |
| C/F | Raymond Almazan | Meralco Bolts | 6–8 | 194 |
| C/F | Dave Marcelo | NLEX Road Warriors | 6–5 | 223 |
| C | JM Calma | NorthPort Batang Pier | 6–6 | 193 |
| F | Jason Perkins | Phoenix Fuel Masters | 6–4 | 235 |
| F | Leonard Santillan^{REP2} | Rain or Shine Elasto Painters | 6–4 | 210 |
| C/F | Moala Tautuaa | San Miguel Beermen | 6–8 | 245 |
| C | Isaac Go | Terrafirma Dyip | 6–7 | 230 |
| C/F | Brandon Ganuelas-Rosser | TNT Tropang Giga | 6–6 | 220 |
| C/F | Christian Standhardinger^{WD1} | Barangay Ginebra San Miguel | 6–8 | 220 |
| C | Keith Datu^{INJ2} | Rain or Shine Elasto Painters | 6–8 | 220 |

Notes

- Gold represent current champion.

^WD1 Christian Standhardinger was unable to participate due to vomiting.
^REP1 Ralph Cu was selected as Christian Standhardinger's replacement.
^INJ2 Keith Datu was unable to participate due to a medial collateral ligament sprain.
^REP2 Leonard Santillan was selected as Keith Datu's replacement.

First Round
Isaac Go (Terrafirma) | W
Jason Perkins (Phoenix) | L
James Laput (Magnolia) | W
Clifford Jopia (Blackwater) | L

Semifinals
Isaac Go (Terrafirma) | L
James Laput (Magnolia) | W

First Round
Dave Marcelo (NLEX) | L
Ralph Cu (Barangay Ginebra) | W
JM Calma (NorthPort) | W
Moala Tautuaa (San Miguel) | L

Semifinals
Ralph Cu (Barangay Ginebra) | L
JM Calma (NorthPort) | W

First Round
Leonard Santillan (Rain or Shine) | W
Raymond Almazan (Meralco) | L
Brandon Ganuelas-Rosser (TNT) | L
Justin Arana (Converge) | W

Semifinals
Leonard Santillan (Rain or Shine) | W
Justin Arana (Converge) | L

Final round
| Pos. | Player | Team | Time |
|---|---|---|---|
| C | JM Calma | NorthPort Batang Pier | 26.00s |
| F | Leonard Santillan | Rain or Shine Elasto Painters | 29.00s |
| C | James Laput | Magnolia Chicken Timplados Hotshots | 30.00s |

=== Three-point Shootout ===
Due to the cancellation of Slam Dunk Contest, the league featured two three-point shootouts, one for guards and one for forwards and centers.

==== Guards edition ====
Contestants
| Pos. | Player | Team | Height | Weight | First round | Final round |
|---|---|---|---|---|---|---|
| F | Calvin Oftana | TNT Tropang Giga | 6–5 | 186 | 22 | 25 |
| G | Paul Lee | Magnolia Chicken Timplados Hotshots | 6–0 | 200 | 26 | 20 |
| G | Chris Newsome | Meralco Bolts | 6–2 | 190 | 28 | 15 |
| F | Ken Tuffin^{REP3} | Phoenix Fuel Masters | 6–4 | | 20 | DNQ |
| F | Arvin Tolentino | NorthPort Batang Pier | 6–5 | 210 | 19 | DNQ |
| F | Javi Gómez de Liaño | Terrafirma Dyip | 6–3 | 193 | 19 | DNQ |
| G | Maverick Ahanmisi | Barangay Ginebra San Miguel | 6–2 | 190 | 18 | DNQ |
| G | Alec Stockton | Converge FiberXers | 6–2 | 170 | 18 | DNQ |
| G/F | James Yap | Blackwater Bossing | 6–2 | 192 | 17 | DNQ |
| G/F | Robbie Herndon | NLEX Road Warriors | 6–3 | 180 | 17 | DNQ |
| G | Andrei Caracut | Rain or Shine Elasto Painters | 5–8 | 180 | 17 | DNQ |
| G/F | Marcio Lassiter | San Miguel Beermen | 6–2 | 185 | 17 | DNQ |
| G | Tyler Tio^{INJ3} | Phoenix Fuel Masters | 6–0 | 170 | DNP | |

Notes

^INJ3 Tyler Tio was unable to participate due to a sprained ankle.
^REP3 Ken Tuffin was selected as Tyler Tio's replacement.

==== Big men edition ====
Contestants
| Pos. | Player | Team | Height | Weight | First round | Final round |
|---|---|---|---|---|---|---|
| C/F | Raymond Almazan | Meralco Bolts | 6–8 | 194 | 17 | 19 |
| F | Dave Marcelo | NLEX Road Warriors | 6–5 | 223 | 17 | 16 |
| F | Christian David | Blackwater Bossing | 6–6 | 215 | 20 | 15 |
| C | Isaac Go | Terrafirma Dyip | 6–7 | 230 | 20 | 13 |
| F | Keith Zaldivar | Converge FiberXers | 6–6 | | 16 | DNQ |
| C | JM Calma | NorthPort Batang Pier | 6–6 | 193 | 16 | DNQ |
| F | Ralph Cu | Barangay Ginebra San Miguel | 6–4 | 210 | 15 | DNQ |
| C | June Mar Fajardo^{REP6} | San Miguel Beermen | 6–11 | 245 | 15 | DNQ |
| F | Jason Perkins | Phoenix Fuel Masters | 6–4 | 235 | 14 | DNQ |
| F | Leonard Santillan^{REP5} | Rain or Shine Elasto Painters | 6–4 | 210 | 12 | DNQ |
| C/F | Brandon Ganuelas-Rosser | TNT Tropang Giga | 6–6 | 220 | 9 | DNQ |
| C | James Laput^{REP4} | Magnolia Chicken Timplados Hotshots | 6–10 | 245 | 5 | DNQ |
| F | Aris Dionisio^{WD4} | Magnolia Chicken Timplados Hotshots | 6–4 | | DNP | |
| C | Keith Datu^{INJ5} | Rain or Shine Elasto Painters | 6–8 | 220 | DNP | |
| C/F | Moala Tautuaa^{WD6} | San Miguel Beermen | 6–8 | 245 | DNP | |

Notes

^WD4 Aris Dionisio was selected as a replacement to the All-Star Game.
^REP4 James Laput was selected as Aris Dionisio's replacement.
^INJ5 Keith Datu was unable to participate due to a medial collateral ligament sprain.
^REP5 Leonard Santillan was selected as Keith Datu's replacement.
^WD6 Moala Tautuaa was unable to participate for undisclosed reasons.
^REP6 June Mar Fajardo was selected as Moala Tautuaa's replacement.

=== Greats vs. Stalwarts ===
The Greats vs. Stalwarts format of the Blitz Game commenced for the second time since it returned in 2023. Both teams were only composed of rookies, sophomores, and junior (third year) players. The game also included a four-point line and a three-point dunk.

==== Draft ====
2024 Blitz Game Draft
| Pick | Player | Team |
|---|---|---|
| 1 | Brandon Ganuelas-Rosser | Greats |
| 2 | Kyt Jimenez | Stalwarts |
| 3 | Javi Gómez de Liaño | Greats |
| 4 | John Amores | Stalwarts |
| 5 | Ken Tuffin | Greats |
| 6 | Stephen Holt | Stalwarts |
| 7 | Jerrick Ahanmisi | Greats |
| 8 | Keith Datu | Stalwarts |
| 9 | Justin Arana | Greats |
| 10 | Fran Yu | Stalwarts |
| 11 | Ralph Cu | Greats |
| 12 | Adrian Nocum | Stalwarts |
| 13 | Andrei Caracut | Greats |
| 14 | Kim Aurin | Stalwarts |
| 15 | RK Ilagan | Greats |
| 16 | JM Calma | Stalwarts |
| 17 | Alec Stockton | Greats |
| 18 | Joshua Munzon | Stalwarts |
| 19 | Gian Mamuyac | Greats |
| 20 | Anton Asistio | Stalwarts |
| 21 | James Laput | Greats |
| 22 | Santi Santillan | Stalwarts |
| 23 | Shaun Ildefonso | Greats |
| 24 | Keith Zaldivar | Stalwarts |

==== Lineups ====
Greats
| Pos | Player | Team | R/S/J |
Starters
| G | Andrei Caracut | Rain or Shine Elasto Painters | Junior |
| G | Alec Stockton | Converge FiberXers | Junior |
| F | Ken Tuffin | Phoenix Fuel Masters | Rookie |
| C/F | Brandon Ganuelas-Rosser | TNT Tropang Giga | Sophomore |
| C | Justin Arana | Converge FiberXers | Sophomore |
Reserves
| G | Jerrick Ahanmisi | Magnolia Chicken Timplados Hotshots | Junior |
| F | Javi Gómez de Liaño | Terrafirma Dyip | Sophomore |
| F | Ralph Cu | Barangay Ginebra San Miguel | Rookie |
| G | RK Ilagan | Blackwater Bossing | Junior |
| G | Gian Mamuyac | Rain or Shine Elasto Painters | Sophomore |
| C | James Laput | Magnolia Chicken Timplados Hotshots | Junior |
| F | Shaun Ildefonso | Rain or Shine Elasto Painters | Sophomore |
Head coach: Patrick Partosa (Barangay Ginebra San Miguel)

Stalwarts
| Pos | Player | Team | R/S/J |
Starters
| G/F | Joshua Munzon | NorthPort Batang Pier | Junior |
| C | Keith Zaldivar | Converge FiberXers | Sophomore |
| F | Leonard Santillan | Rain or Shine Elasto Painters | Junior |
| G | Stephen Holt | Terrafirma Dyip | Rookie |
| G | Kim Aurin | TNT Tropang Giga | Rookie |
Reserves
| G | John Amores | NorthPort Batang Pier | Rookie |
| F | Fran Yu | NorthPort Batang Pier | Rookie |
| G | Adrian Nocum | Rain or Shine Elasto Painters | Rookie |
| C | JM Calma | NorthPort Batang Pier | Sophomore |
| G | Anton Asistio | Rain or Shine Elasto Painters | Junior |
| C | Keith Datu^{INJ7} | Rain or Shine Elasto Painters | Rookie |
| G | Kyt Jimenez^{INJ8} | San Miguel Beermen | Rookie |
| F | Christian David^{REP7} | Blackwater Bossing | Rookie |
Head coach: Peter Martin (San Miguel Beermen)

Notes

^INJ7 Keith Datu was unable to play due to a medial collateral ligament sprain.
^REP7 Christian David was selected as Keith Datu's replacement.
^INJ8 Kyt Jimenez was unable to play due to arm laceration.

==== Game ====
RPTV and PBA Rush

March 23
6:15 pm

Box score

Greats 142, Stalwarts 133
Scoring by quarter: 39–45, 39–28, 31–33, 33–27
| Pts: Arana 36 | Pts: Aurin 23 |

La Salle Coliseum, Bacolod, Negros Occidental

- Game MVP: Justin Arana (Greats)

== Sunday events ==
=== Shooting Stars ===
The Shooting Stars commenced for the second consecutive year. There was one PBA courtside reporter, one government official, one sportswriter and a lucky fan. Team Yellow led by Tiebreaker Times sportswriter Justine Bacnis won the Shooting Stars.

=== All-Star Game ===
The format of the all-star game was patterned after the NBA's version, wherein fans voted up to 24 players and two coaches. The two players with the highest number of votes became the team captains and selected their teammates via draft. The game also included a four-point line and a three-point dunk, similar to the earlier Blitz Game.

==== Rosters ====
The voting started on December 3 and ended on February 7. The final results were announced on February 21, with Mark Barroca of Magnolia Chicken Timplados Hotshots and Japeth Aguilar of Barangay Ginebra San Miguel emerging as the top vote-getters and thus are the two opposing captains during the All-Star Game.

2024 PBA All-Stars
| Pos | Player | Team | No. of selections |
Players
| G | Mark Barroca | Magnolia Chicken Timplados Hotshots | 9 |
| C/F | Japeth Aguilar | Barangay Ginebra San Miguel | 9 |
| G | Scottie Thompson | Barangay Ginebra San Miguel | 6 |
| C | June Mar Fajardo | San Miguel Beermen | 9 |
| F | Calvin Abueva | Magnolia Chicken Timplados Hotshots | 9 |
| C/F | Christian Standhardinger | Barangay Ginebra San Miguel | 2 |
| F | Jamie Malonzo | Barangay Ginebra San Miguel | 2 |
| G | Paul Lee | Magnolia Chicken Timplados Hotshots | 10 |
| G | CJ Perez | San Miguel Beermen | 2 |
| G | Maverick Ahanmisi | Barangay Ginebra San Miguel | 1 |
| F | Calvin Oftana | TNT Tropang Giga | 2 |
| G | Stanley Pringle | Barangay Ginebra San Miguel | 7 |
| G | Chris Newsome | Meralco Bolts | 2 |
| G | Terrence Romeo | San Miguel Beermen | 7 |
| F | Arvin Tolentino | NorthPort Batang Pier | 2 |
| G | Jayson Castro | TNT Tropang Giga | 9 |
| G | Jio Jalalon | Magnolia Chicken Timplados Hotshots | 5 |
| G/F | Marcio Lassiter | San Miguel Beermen | 8 |
| C/F | Ian Sangalang | Magnolia Chicken Timplados Hotshots | 2 |
| G | Robert Bolick | NLEX Road Warriors | 2 |
| G | John Pinto | Barangay Ginebra San Miguel | 2 |
| G/F | Ricci Rivero | Phoenix Fuel Masters | 1 |
| G | Juami Tiongson | Terrafirma Dyip | 1 |
| G/F | Gabe Norwood | Rain or Shine Elasto Painters | 11 |
| F | Cliff Hodge | Meralco Bolts | 1 |
| F | Jason Perkins | Phoenix Fuel Masters | 2 |
| G | Tyler Tio | Phoenix Fuel Masters | 1 |
| G/F | Don Trollano | San Miguel Beermen | 1 |
| G/F | James Yap | Blackwater Bossing | 18 |
Coaches
| | Tim Cone | Barangay Ginebra San Miguel | 10 |
| | Jorge Gallent | San Miguel Beermen | 1 |

Note: Hodge, Perkins, Tio and Trollano were selected by the coaches and media, while Yap was chosen by the City of Bacolod.

All-Star reserve
| Pos | Player | Team | No. of selections (Note: If they actually played the All-Star Game) |
|---|---|---|---|
| G/F | Roger Pogoy | TNT Tropang Giga | 5 |
| F | Aris Dionisio | Magnolia Chicken Timplados Hotshots | 1 |

==== Draft ====
The PBA-All Star draft was held on February 26. A coin toss was first used to determine the head coaches for the teams, with Tim Cone going to Team Japeth and Jorge Gallent to Team Mark. In another coin toss, Team Japeth won the flip and earned the right to draft first.

2024 All-Star Draft
| Pick | Player | Team |
|---|---|---|
| 1 | Christian Standhardinger | Japeth |
| 2 | June Mar Fajardo | Mark |
| 3 | Scottie Thompson | Japeth |
| 4 | Jason Perkins | Mark |
| 5 | Paul Lee | Japeth |
| 6 | CJ Perez | Mark |
| 7 | Calvin Oftana | Japeth |
| 8 | Robert Bolick | Mark |
| 9 | Jamie Malonzo | Japeth |
| 10 | Jio Jalalon | Mark |
| 11 | Chris Newsome | Japeth |
| 12 | Ian Sangalang | Mark |
| 13 | Don Trollano | Japeth |
| 14 | James Yap | Mark |
| 15 | Marcio Lassiter | Japeth |
| 16 | Calvin Abueva | Mark |
| 17 | Arvin Tolentino | Japeth |
| 18 | Jayson Castro | Mark |
| 19 | Maverick Ahanmisi | Japeth |
| 20 | Gabe Norwood | Mark |
| 21 | Tyler Tio | Japeth |
| 22 | Ricci Rivero | Mark |
| 23 | Stanley Pringle | Japeth |
| 24 | Cliff Hodge | Mark |
| 25 | Terrence Romeo | Japeth |
| 26 | Juami Tiongson | Mark |
| 27 | John Pinto | Mark |

==== Lineups ====
All of the reserve players, played the game as replacements to injured All-Stars, namely Tyler Tio and Scottie Thompson.

Christian Standhardinger was unable to play the game due to vomiting. However, the league didn't assign a replacement player for him.

Team Japeth
| Pos | Player | Team |
Starters
| G | Paul Lee | Magnolia Chicken Timplados Hotshots |
| G | Chris Newsome | Meralco Bolts |
| C/F | Japeth Aguilar | Barangay Ginebra San Miguel |
| F | Calvin Oftana | TNT Tropang Giga |
| F | Jamie Malonzo | Barangay Ginebra San Miguel |
Reserves
| G/F | Don Trollano | San Miguel Beermen |
| G/F | Marcio Lassiter | San Miguel Beermen |
| F | Arvin Tolentino | NorthPort Batang Pier |
| G | Maverick Ahanmisi | Barangay Ginebra San Miguel |
| F | Aris Dionisio | Magnolia Chicken Timplados Hotshots |
| G/F | Roger Pogoy | TNT Tropang Giga |
| G | Stanley Pringle | Barangay Ginebra San Miguel |
| G | Terrence Romeo | San Miguel Beermen |
Head coach: Tim Cone (Barangay Ginebra San Miguel)

Team Mark
| Pos | Player | Team |
Starters
| G | Mark Barroca | Magnolia Chicken Timplados Hotshots |
| F | Cliff Hodge | Meralco Bolts |
| C | June Mar Fajardo | San Miguel Beermen |
| G/F | James Yap | Blackwater Bossing |
| G/F | CJ Perez | San Miguel Beermen |
Reserves
| F | Jason Perkins | Phoenix Fuel Masters |
| G | Robert Bolick | NLEX Road Warriors |
| G | Jio Jalalon | Magnolia Chicken Timplados Hotshots |
| C/F | Ian Sangalang | Magnolia Chicken Timplados Hotshots |
| F | Calvin Abueva | Magnolia Chicken Timplados Hotshots |
| G | Jayson Castro | TNT Tropang Giga |
| G/F | Gabe Norwood | Rain or Shine Elasto Painters |
| G/F | Ricci Rivero | Phoenix Fuel Masters |
| G | Juami Tiongson | Terrafirma Dyip |
| G | John Pinto | Barangay Ginebra San Miguel |
Head coach: Jorge Gallent (San Miguel Beermen)

==== Game ====
RPTV and PBA Rush

March 24
6:30 pm

Box score

Team Japeth 140, Team Mark 140
Scoring by quarter: 46–20, 33–48, 32–36, 29–36
| Pts: Pogoy 25 | Pts: Perez 39 |

La Salle Coliseum, Bacolod, Negros Occidental

Team Japeth was leading most of the time, but Team Mark was able to come back because of their amazing perimeter shooting, in the last minute of the fourth quarter, Robert Bolick made back-to-back four-point shots, one to cut the lead to 5 then made another while being fouled which makes it a potential 5-point play, then he makes the free throw which ties the game. The game ends in a tie 140-140 which happens for the first time in PBA All-Star history.

- All-Star Game MVP: Japeth Aguilar (Team Japeth) and Robert Bolick (Team Mark)
