= CJ Perez =

Filipino basketball player (born 1993)

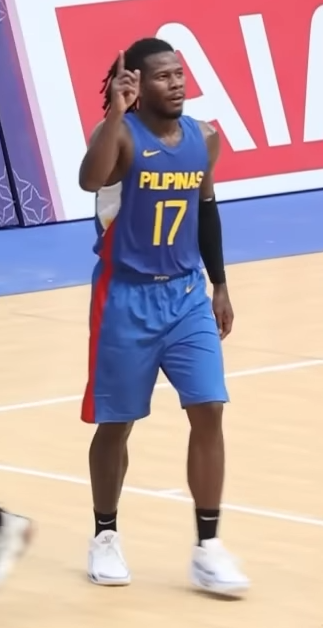
- Perez in 2023

No. 77 – San Miguel Beermen
- Position: Shooting guard / small forward
- League: PBA

Personal information
- Born: November 17, 1993 (age 32) Kowloon, British Hong Kong
- Listed height: 6 ft 2 in (1.88 m)
- Listed weight: 187 lb (85 kg)

Career information
- College: San Sebastian (2012–2014); Lyceum (2017–2018)
- PBA draft: 2018: 1st round1st overall
- Drafted by: Columbian Dyip
- Playing career: 2019–present
- Coaching career: 2025–present

Career history

Playing
- 2019–2020: Columbian / Terrafirma Dyip
- 2021–present: San Miguel Beermen

Coaching
- 2025: PSP Gymers (assistant)

Career highlights
- 4× PBA champion (2022 Philippine, 2023–24 Commissioner's, 2025 Philippine, 2025–26 Philippine)); PBA Finals MVP (2023–24 Commissioner's); PBA Best Player of the Conference (2023–24 Commissioner's); 3× PBA All-Star (2023, 2024, 2026); 4× PBA Mythical First Team (2019, 2023–2025); PBA Mythical Second Team (2021); PBA All-Defensive Team (2019); PBA Rookie of the Year (2019); PBA All-Rookie Team (2019); 3× PBA Scoring Champion (2019, 2020, 2023); PBA D-League champion (2018 Aspirant's Cup); PBA D-League Aspirants’ Cup Most Valuable Player (2018); PCCL champion (2017); PCCL Mythical 5 (2017); NCAA Philippines Most Valuable Player (2017); NCAA Philippines Mythical Team (2017); Filoil Flying V Preseason Cup Mythical 5 (2017)
Medals
Men's basketball
Representing Philippines
Asian Games
Gold medal – first place	2022 Hangzhou	Team
SEA Games
Gold medal – first place	2023 Phnom Penh	Team
Men's 3x3 basketball
Representing Philippines
SEA Games
Gold medal – first place	2019 Philippines	Team

Christian Jaymar Perez (born November 17, 1993) is a Filipino professional basketball player for the San Miguel Beermen of the Philippine Basketball Association (PBA). He was selected 1st overall in the 2018 PBA draft by Columbian Dyip.

In 2025, he made his coaching debut as an assistant coach for the PSP Gymers of the Women's Maharlika Pilipinas Basketball League (WMPBL).

== Early life and college career ==
Perez was born in Kowloon, British Hong Kong, to a Nigerian father and Filipino mother. He grew up in Bautista, Pangasinan, Philippines.

Perez played for San Sebastian College – Recoletos Stags, Ateneo De Manila University Blue Eagles and Lyceum of the Philippines University Pirates.

In his final college season in Lyceum, he averaged a league-best 19.3 points per game, while grabbing 6.5 rebounds and 3.6 assists while leading the Pirates to an 18-game sweep of the eliminations, where they were eventually beaten by San Beda in the Finals. He also could have been on the NCAA Mythical Team that year if not for a suspension.

== Professional career ==
=== PBA D-League ===
Perez played for Zark's Burger-Lyceum, which was composed of the core of the Pirates that won 18 straight games in the NCAA Season 93 tournament before losing in the Finals to the San Beda Red Lions. He led Zark's Burger-Lyceum to the Finals averaging 17.5 points, 6.5 rebounds, 3.9 assists, and 1.9 steals to the championship round. He was named as the 2018 PBA D-League Aspirants’ Cup Conference Most Valuable Player.

=== Columbian / Terrafirma Dyip (2018–2020) ===
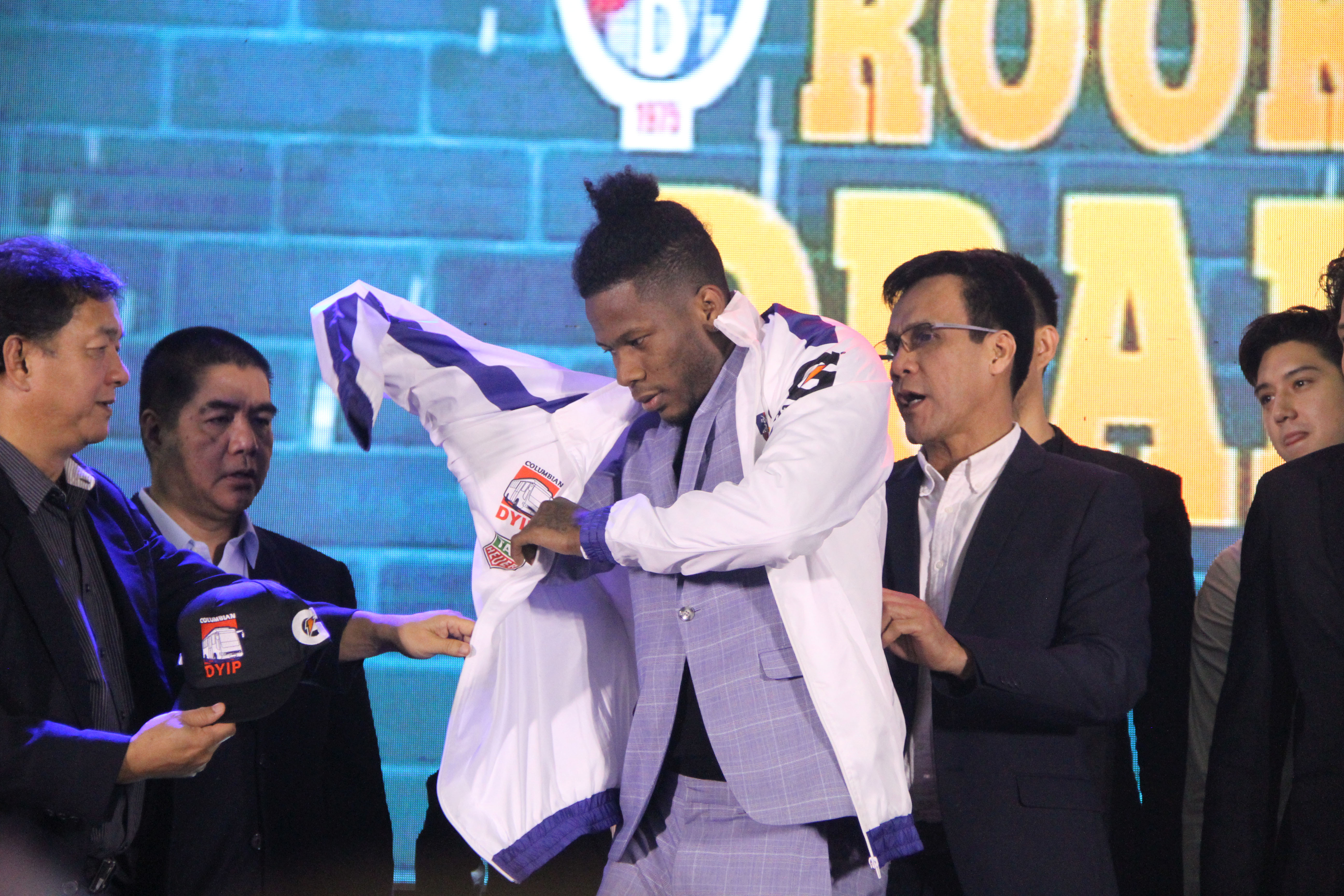
Perez after being drafted by the Columbian Dyip during the 2018 PBA draft

On December 16, 2018, Perez was selected first overall by the Columbian Dyip in the 2018 PBA draft. In his first career game, he scored 26 points in a win against the San Miguel Beermen. Three games later, he was unanimously awarded the first-ever PBA Press Corps Rookie of the Month for January. For the month of February, Perez was second in voting for Rookie of the Month, losing the award to Javee Mocon. During All-Star Weekend, he participated in the Rookies/Sophomores vs. Juniors game (winning MVP), the slam dunk contest, and the All-Star 3x3. His team did not qualify for the playoffs for the Philippine Cup, finishing with a 4–7 record. In the Commissioner's Cup, Perez exploded for a career-high 39 points in a 120–105 win against the NLEX Road Warriors. He ended the 2019 season with the Rookie of the Year award, a First Mythical Team selection (the first rookie since Calvin Abueva in 2013), and was on the All-Defensive Team (the first rookie since Ryan Reyes in 2008.) He also led the league in scoring with 20.8 points, the first rookie since Eric Menk to do so, back in 1999. His 20.8 points a game is also the third-highest among the highest scoring averages for a rookie in the PBA.

In his final season with Terrafirma, he averaged 24.4 points a game, leading the league in scoring.

=== San Miguel Beermen (2021–present) ===
On February 2, 2021, Perez was traded to the San Miguel Beermen for Matt Ganuelas-Rosser, Russel Escoto, Gelo Alolino, and two future first-round picks. Perez won his first championship with the Beermen in the 2022 Philippine Cup. In Game 7, he scored 25 points, including 7 during the Beermen's 4th quarter rally.

== PBA career statistics ==
Legend
GP	Games played	MPG	Minutes per game	FG%	Field-goal percentage
3FG%	3-point field-goal percentage	4P%	4-point field-goal percentage	FT%	Free-throw percentage
RPG	Rebounds per game	APG	Assists per game	SPG	Steals per game
BPG	Blocks per game	PPG	Points per game	127	Career high

As of the end of 2025–26 season

Led the league

=== Season-by-season averages ===
Year	Team	GP	MPG	FG%	3P%	4P%	FT%	RPG	APG	SPG	BPG	PPG
2019	Columbian	33	37.8	.447	.325	—	.639	7.4	3.4	1.9	.4	20.8
2020	Terrafirma	11	37.2	.436	.269	—	.623	6.8	4.3	2.0	.6	24.4
2021	San Miguel	32	29.5	.433	.308	—	.688	5.8	1.8	1.3	.5	14.8
2022–23	San Miguel	59	33.0	.448	.285	—	.684	6.1	4.2	1.9	.5	18.7
2023–24	San Miguel	44	31.1	.442	.291	—	.687	6.3	3.7	1.9	.2	18.9
2024–25	San Miguel	58	30.2	.433	.297	.290	.644	5.0	4.5	1.4	.5	17.8
2025–26	San Miguel	50	28.8	.433	.314	.284	.621	3.9	3.4	1.4	.1	18.2
Career		287	31.7	.440	.300	.287	.658	5.7	3.7	1.7	.4	18.5

== National team career ==
Perez first started playing for the Philippines in the 2016 FIBA Asia Challenge. He was also a member of the Team Manila roster for the 2016 FIBA 3x3 All Stars in Doha, Qatar. He played with Rey Guevarra, Sidney Onwubere and Bright Akhuetie in this competition. The team finished 7th out of 8th competitors.

In 2019, Perez was one of the youngest members of the Gilas team that played in the 2019 FIBA Basketball World Cup. His averages of 12.6 points, 3.2 rebounds, and 2.6 assists and fearless brand of basketball was a silver lining in a campaign that saw the Philippines finish dead last in the World Cup. He was named to the Gilas 3x3 team for the SEA Games, along with Chris Newsome, Jason Perkins, and Moala Tautuaa. That team went on to sweep their competition in eight games, winning the gold medal

In 2020, Perez was among the 12 chosen for the Asia Cup qualifiers against Indonesia. He had 11 points, 7 rebounds, 3 assists and 4 steals in that game that they won, 100–70. Perez was also named to the FIBA 3x3 OQT lineup, along with SEA Games teammate Moala Tautuaa, Joshua Munzon, and Alvin Pasaol. They finished in last place in that tournament.

Perez was included in the 21-man pool for the 2023 FIBA World Cup, where he was eventually included in the final 12-man lineup.

== Player profile ==
Perez's game has been primarily influenced by Calvin Abueva, to the point where he notes Abueva as his favorite player at the game. His rebounding and aggressiveness has been compared positively to Calvin Abueva's college years at San Sebastian College – Recoletos.
