= 2018 PBA D-League Aspirants' Cup =

2018 PBA D-League Aspirant's Cup
- The 7th PBA Aspirant's Cup
- Duration: January 18 – May 1, 2018
- Number of teams: 13
- TV partner(s): AksyonTV (ESPN 5)

Finals
- Champions: Zark's Burger - LPU
- Runners-up: Che'Lu Bar & Grill

PBA D-League Aspirant's Cup chronology
- < 2017 2019 >

The 2018 PBA D-League Aspirants Cup was the first conference of the 2017-18 PBA Developmental League season. It was opened on January 18, 2018, at the Ynares Sports Arena and competed by 13 teams and it was finished on May 1, 2018, where the Zark's Burger - LPU defeated the Che'Lu Bar & Grill in the best-of-three championship series, 2–1, and clinching their first ever title in their franchise.

== Tournament Format ==
- Ten teams will play in a single round-robin elimination phase.
- Only the top six teams will only make it to the playoffs after the elimination round.
- The top two seeds will head straight to the semifinals, while 3rd through 6th seeds will undergo in the quarterfinals.
- The semifinals and finals are both a best-of-three series.

== Standings ==
These are the final team standings at the end of elimination round:

Pos	Team	Pld	W	L	PCT	GB	Qualification
1	Akari - Adamson Soaring Falcons	11	9	2	.818	—	Outright semifinals
2	Marinerong Pilipino Skippers	11	9	2	.818	—	Outright semifinals
3	CEU Scorpions	11	8	3	.727	1	Twice-to-beat in the quarterfinals
4	Che'lu Bar & Grill Revellers	11	7	4	.636	2	Twice-to-beat in the quarterfinals
5	Gamboa Coffee Mixers	11	7	4	.636	2	Twice-to-win in the quarterfinals
6	Zark's Jawbreakers	11	7	4	.636	2	Twice-to-win in the quarterfinals
7	Wang's Basketball Couriers	11	6	5	.545	3	Eliminated
8	Go for Gold Scratchers	11	5	6	.455	4	Eliminated
9	Perpetual Altas	11	3	8	.273	6	Eliminated
10	EAC Generals - Batangas	11	2	9	.182	7	Eliminated
11	JRU Heavy Bombers	11	2	9	.182	7	Eliminated
12	AMA Online Education Titans	11	1	10	.091	8	Eliminated
13	~~Mila's Lechon Mighty Roasters~~ (Note: Team withdrew from the league after playing four games due to internal problems.)	4	0	4	.000	5.5	Withdrew

Source: Philsports.ph

Rules for classification: 1) Points; 2) Goal difference; 3) Number of goals scored;

=== Results ===
Teams	AKA	MPS	CEU	CHE	GAM	ZRK	WNG	GFG	UPHSD	EAC	JRU	AMA	MLS
Akari - Adamson		80–75	57–76	84–75	92–85	76–83	90–71	98–92	101–83	89–79	71–64	100–89	
Marinerong Pilipino			93–104	82–67	99–83	94–92	96–84	86–80	78–66	92–78	84–62	109–93	
CEU Scorpions				105–88	83–100	91–85	79–75	89–91*	90–85	87–89	77–75	118–83	
Che'lu Bar & Grill					79–73	97–88	82–83	87–65	83–70	99–60	74–67	83–79	
Gamboa Coffee						107–106*	87–76	68–75	78–73	104–81	93–76	136–90	70–58
Zark's-LPU							95–93	108–94	108–106*	112–75	91–81	109–85	102–55
Wang's Basketball								91–88	88–83	94–92	73–55	93–75	
Go for Gold									81–69	–	–	122–82	
Perpetual Altas										–	–	89–81	65–48
EAC Generals													
JRU Heavy Bombers													96–67
AMA Titans													
Mila's Lechon													

Source: Philsports.ph
Legend: Blue = left column team win; Red = top row team win.
Matches with lighter background shading were decided after overtime.

Table included the results of Mila's Lechon prior to their withdrawal to the league. Number of asterisks after each score denotes number of overtimes played.

== Playoffs ==
Quarterfinals (Higher seeds have twice-to-beat)
4	Che'lu Bar & Grill	80
5	Gamboa Coffee	72
3	CEU Scorpions	95	77
6	Zark's Jawbreakers-LPU	104	82

Semifinals (Best-of-3 series)
1	Akari-Adamson	0
4	Che'lu Bar & Grill	2
2	Marinerong Pilipino Skippers	0
6	Zark's Jawbreakers-LPU	2

Finals (Best-of-3 series)
4	Che'lu Bar & Grill	1
6	Zark's Jawbreakers-LPU	2

=== Quarterfinals ===
Higher-seeded teams need only win once to advance to the semifinals, lower-seeded teams need to win twice to advance to the next round.

==== (#3) CEU Scorpions vs. (#6) Zark's Jawbreakers ====
ESPN 5

April 10, 2018

CEU Scorpions	95–104	Zark's Jawbreakers-LPU

Pasig City Sports Center, Pasig

ESPN 5

April 12, 2018

CEU Scorpions	77–82	Zark's Jawbreakers-LPU
Zark's-LPU wins series in two games

Ynares Sports Arena, Pasig

==== (#4) Che'lu Bar & Grill Revellers vs. (#5) Gamboa Coffee Mixers ====
ESPN 5

April 10, 2018
2:00 pm

Chelu Bar & Grill Revellers	80–72	Gamboa Coffee Mixers
Scoring by quarter: 16–27, 21–13, 15–16, 28–16

Pasig City Sports Center, Pasig

=== Semifinals ===
==== (#1) Akari-Adamson Falcons vs. (#4) Che'lu Bar & Grill Revellers ====
ESPN 5

April 17, 2018

Watch

Akari-Adamson Falcons	60–70	Che'lu Bar & Grill Revellers
Scoring by quarter: 16–24, 19–11, 21–26, 4–9

Pasig City Sports Center, Pasig

ESPN 5

April 19, 2018

Watch

Akari-Adamson Falcons	90–93	Che'lu Bar & Grill Revellers
Scoring by quarter: 31–18, 25–32, 17–23, 17–20
Che'lu wins series, 2–0

Ynares Sports Arena, Pasig

==== (#2) Marinerong Pilipino Skippers vs. (#6) Zark's Jawbreakers ====
ESPN 5

April 17, 2018

Watch

Marinerong Pilipino Skippers	87–90 (OT)	Zark's Jawbreakers-LPU
Scoring by quarter: 20–23, 23–12, 22–24, 16–22, Overtime: 6–9

Pasig City Sports Center, Pasig

ESPN 5

April 19, 2018

Watch

Marinerong Pilipino Skippers	89–102	Zark's Jawbreakers-LPU
Scoring by quarter: 21–23, 24–22, 19–31, 25–26
Zark's-LPU wins series, 2–0

Ynares Sports Arena, Pasig

=== Finals ===
The finals is a best-of-three series.

ESPN 5

April 24, 2018
4:00 pm

Che'lu Bar & Grill Revellers	107–103	Zark's Jawbreakers-LPU
Scoring by quarter: 34–26, 21–31, 21–19, 31–27

Pasig City Sports Center, Pasig

ESPN 5

April 26, 2018
4:00 pm

Che'lu Bar & Grill Revellers	90–98	Zark's Jawbreakers-LPU
Scoring by quarter: 16–27, 18–27, 22–21, 34–23

Ynares Sports Arena, Pasig

ESPN 5

May 1, 2018
4:00 pm

Che'lu Bar & Grill Revellers	82–92	Zark's Jawbreakers-LPU
Scoring by quarter: 18–21, 24–16, 28–27, 12–28
Zark's-LPU wins series, 2–1

Ynares Sports Arena, Pasig

== Awards ==
2018 PBA D-League Aspirant's Cup Champions
Zark's Burgers Jawbreakers
First title

- Conference MVP: CJ Perez (Zark's Burgers)
