= Juami Tiongson =

Filipino basketball player (born 1991)

No. 3 – Terrafirma Dyip
- Position: Point guard
- League: PBA

Personal information
- Born: February 5, 1991 (age 35) Mandaluyong, Philippines
- Listed height: 5 ft 10 in (1.78 m)
- Listed weight: 175 lb (79 kg)

Career information
- High school: Ateneo (Quezon City)
- College: Ateneo
- PBA draft: 2014: 1st round, 12th overall pick
- Drafted by: Blackwater Elite
- Playing career: 2014–present

Career history
- 2014–2016: Blackwater Elite
- 2017–2019: NLEX Road Warriors
- 2019–2024: Columbian/Terrafirma Dyip
- 2024–2026: San Miguel Beermen
- 2026–present: Terrafirma Dyip

Career highlights
- 2× PBA champion (2025 Philippine, 2025–26 Philippine); PBA All-Star (2024); PBA Most Improved Player (2021); PBA Second Mythical Team (2024); 4× UAAP champion (2009–2012)

Juan Miguel B. "Juami" Tiongson (born February 5, 1991) is a Filipino professional basketball player for the Terrafirma Dyip of the Philippine Basketball Association (PBA). Tiongson was drafted by the Blackwater Elite twelfth overall in the 2014 PBA draft. He played college basketball at Ateneo de Manila University.

== Professional career ==
=== Blackwater Elite (2014–2016) ===
On August 24, 2014, Tiongson was drafted by the Blackwater Elite with its 12th overall pick in the 2014 PBA Rookie Draft. He played with them for 2 years, then was bought out.

=== NLEX Road Warriors (2017–2019) ===
Later on, the NLEX Road Warriors gave him a new contract to play for them. He earned his first PBA Player of the Week with that team. On September 7, 2017, he was re-signed to a 2-year contract extension.

=== Columbian/Terrafirma Dyip (2019–2024) ===
On August 20, 2019, he was traded to the Northport Batang Pier for Michael Miranda. The next day, he was traded to the Columbian Dyip for Jerramy King. He started the Governor's Cup strong, scoring 11 points, 4 rebounds and 4 assists in his debut win against the Alaska Aces, then finished with 10 points, 4 rebounds, and 2 assists in a loss to the Rain or Shine Elastopainters. The team failed to make the playoffs, going 4–7.

The next season, which was the 2020 Philippine Cup, the Terrafirma Dyip had a worse record, only winning one game. For this season, he averaged career highs in every statistic and played major minutes in all the elimination games.

In the 2021 Philippine Cup, the Dyip started off with a 0–4 record. Then in their 5th game against the San Miguel Beermen, Tiongson had a career-high 28 points in their 110–104 overtime win. He broke that career-high in the next game with 31 points on 9 of 15 threes in a 95–90 win against the Barangay Ginebra. For his efforts, he was given a Player of the Week Award. Despite this, the team failed to make the playoffs again, finishing 4–7 in 9th place. In the Governors' Cup, he had 27 points against Ginebra, but missed two free throws that could have given them the win. He missed the last game of their season due to an ankle sprain he had during practice. The Dyip did not make the playoffs for that conference either.

Before the start of the 2022–23 PBA season, during the Leo Awards, Tiongson was awarded as the Most Improved Player. He dedicated the award to his mother. He became an unrestricted free agent on January 1, 2023, but he immediately signed a new two-year contract with the team on January 4.

=== San Miguel Beermen (2024–2026) ===
On November 25, 2024, Tiongson was traded to the San Miguel Beermen along with Andreas Cahilig for Vic Manuel and Terrence Romeo.

=== Terrafirma Dyip (2026–present) ===
On June 3, 2026, Tiongson was traded back to Terrafirma along with Chris Miller and 2028 San Miguel's second-round pick in exchange for Jerrick Ahanmisi and Paolo Hernandez.

== PBA career statistics ==
Legend
GP	Games played	MPG	Minutes per game	FG%	Field-goal percentage
3FG%	3-point field-goal percentage	4P%	4-point field-goal percentage	FT%	Free-throw percentage
RPG	Rebounds per game	APG	Assists per game	SPG	Steals per game
BPG	Blocks per game	PPG	Points per game	127	Career high

As of the end of 2025–26 season

=== Season-by-season averages ===
Year	Team	GP	MPG	FG%	3P%	4P%	FT%	RPG	APG	SPG	BPG	PPG
2014–15	Blackwater	10	12.3	.400	.286	—	.857	1.5	.7	.2	—	4.4
2015–16	Blackwater	10	8.2	.348	.300	—	.600	.5	1.2	.3	—	2.2
2016–17	NLEX	23	15.6	.383	.324	—	.810	1.6	1.3	.6	.2	6.7
2017–18	NLEX	41	16.5	.368	.326	—	.741	1.7	2.2	.5	.0	5.5
2019	NLEX	32	18.5	.403	.343	—	.878	2.2	3.0	.8	.1	8.1
2019	Columbian	32	18.5	.403	.343	—	.878	2.2	3.0	.8	.1	8.1
2020	Terrafirma	11	27.7	.433	.396	—	.889	2.4	3.1	1.5	—	13.4
2021	Terrafirma	21	33.1	.406	.379	—	.778	2.9	3.3	.9	.0	16.4
2022–23	Terrafirma	31	33.9	.438	.383	—	.828	3.4	3.0	.9	.1	18.1
2023–24	Terrafirma	24	37.5	.416	.327	—	.903	4.0	4.0	1.0	—	20.6
2024–25	Terrafirma	39	23.6	.387	.409	.240	.889	1.7	2.1	.3	—	9.2
2024–25	San Miguel	39	23.6	.387	.409	.240	.889	1.7	2.1	.3	—	9.2
2025–26	San Miguel	46	20.3	.396	.387	.182	.857	1.5	2.2	.5	.0	8.1
2025–26	Terrafirma	46	20.3	.396	.387	.182	.857	1.5	2.2	.5	.0	8.1
Career		288	23.6	.405	.364	.222	.844	2.1	2.5	.6	.0	10.4
