= Gelo Alolino =

Filipino basketball player

Free agent
- Position: Point guard

Personal information
- Born: January 4, 1994 (age 32) Bacoor, Cavite, Philippines
- Listed height: 6 ft 0 in (1.83 m)
- Listed weight: 185 lb (84 kg)

Career information
- High school: Perpetual (Las Piñas)
- College: NU (2011–2015)
- PBA draft: 2016: 2nd round, 2nd overall pick
- Drafted by: Phoenix Fuel Masters
- Playing career: 2016–present

Career history
- 2016–2018: Phoenix Fuel Masters
- 2019: Blackwater Elite
- 2020: San Miguel Beermen
- 2021–2024: Terrafirma Dyip

Career highlights
- UAAP champion (2014)

Joshua Angelo Alolino is a Filipino basketball player who last played for the Terrafirma Dyip of the Philippine Basketball Association (PBA). He was selected in the second round of the 2016 PBA draft by the Phoenix Fuel Masters with the 14th overall pick.

== PBA career statistics ==
Legend
GP	Games played	MPG	Minutes per game
FG%	Field-goal percentage	3P%	3-point field-goal percentage	FT%	Free-throw percentage
RPG	Rebounds per game	APG	Assists per game	SPG	Steals per game
BPG	Blocks per game	PPG	Points per game	**Bold**	Career high

As of the end of 2023–24 season

=== Season-by-season averages ===
Year	Team	GP	MPG	FG%	3P%	FT%	RPG	APG	SPG	BPG	PPG
2016–17	Phoenix	**35**	14.1	.397	.273	.702	1.6	1.1	.6	.0	6.0
2017–18	Phoenix	19	13.8	.402	**.441**	.667	**1.7**	1.3	**.7**	**.2**	**6.1**
2019	Blackwater	22	9.0	.261	.200	.700	1.0	.9	.4	—	2.1
2020	San Miguel	7	7.0	**.444**	.333	**1.000**	.3	.7	.4	—	2.7
2021	Terrafirma	1	**15.4**	.000	.000	.667	—	**3.0**	—	—	2.0
2022–23	Terrafirma	21	13.2	.309	.256	.727	1.7	1.3	.3	.0	3.7
2023–24	Terrafirma	25	12.9	.439	.360	.667	1.3	1.7	.6	.1	5.3
Career		130	12.4	.375	.301	.694	1.4	1.3	.5	.1	4.6
