= Kemark Cariño =

Filipino basketball player (born 1998)

No. 33 – Barangay Ginebra San Miguel
- Position: Center / power forward
- League: PBA

Personal information
- Born: February 1, 1998 (age 28)
- Listed height: 6 ft 8 in (2.03 m)

Career information
- College: San Beda
- PBA draft: 2023: 2nd round, 13th overall pick
- Drafted by: Terrafirma Dyip
- Playing career: 2021–present

Career history
- 2021–2022: Aomori Wat's
- 2022: Pegasus Brunei
- 2023: Zamboanga Valientes
- 2023: Muntinlupa Cagers
- 2023: Nueva Ecija Rice Vanguards
- 2023–2025: Terrafirma Dyip
- 2026–present: Barangay Ginebra San Miguel

Career highlights
- PBA champion (2026 Commissioner's); PBA All-Defensive Team (2024); PBA All-Rookie Team (2024); 2× NCAA Philippines champion (2017, 2018)

Kemark Devera Cariño (born February 1, 1998) is a Filipino professional basketball player for the Barangay Ginebra San Miguel of the Philippine Basketball Association (PBA) and listed at 6 ft 8 in.

He played for the San Beda Red Lions in college and had stints in the PBA D-League. In 2021, he turned professional with the Aomori Wat's in the second division of Japan's B.League. In 2023, he moved to the Zamboanga Valientes for the ABL Invitational before joining the Maharlika Pilipinas Basketball League (MPBL) with the Muntinlupa Cagers. Mid-season, he moved to the Nueva Ecija Rice Vanguards.

During the PBA season 48 draft, Cariño was selected with the 13th overall pick by Terrafirma. In his first season in the PBA, he was selected to the PBA All-Defensive Team. He also won two NCAA Philippines championships with San Beda.

== College career ==
In college, Kemark played for the San Beda Red Lions where he won two championships in 2017 and 2018.

== Professional career ==
=== Aomori Wat's (2021–2022) ===
On July 21, 2021, Kemark signed with the Aomori Wat's, competing in the second division of Japan's B.League. Although he had two years of eligibility left with San Beda, he stated that family was the main reason for signing with Aomori in a statement to Tiebreaker Times.

=== Post B-League and pre-PBA stints (2022–2023) ===
Cariño then returned to domestic basketball in the PBA D-League, playing for the Marinerong Pilipino Skippers. Kemark also had a brief stint with Pegasus Brunei before joining the Zamboanga Valientes for the 2023 ABL Invitational.

After the ABL Invitational, Kemark entered the Maharlika Pilipinas Basketball League, playing for the Muntinlupa Cagers. Mid-season, however, he moved to the Nueva Ecija Rice Vanguards. In sixteen games in the MPBL, he averaged 7.3 points and 8 rebounds alongside 1.6 blocks per game.

=== Terrafirma Dyip (2023–2025) ===
At 6′8½, Cariño was selected 13th overall by the Terrafirma Dyip during the PBA season 48 draft. He was selected to the PBA All-Defensive Team after averaging 6.7 points, 4.8 rebounds, and 1.8 blocks in his first season in the PBA.

=== Barangay Ginebra San Miguel (2026–present) ===
On February 27, 2026, Cariño was traded to Barangay Ginebra San Miguel in exchange for Ben Adamos.

== Career statistics ==
=== PBA ===
Legend
GP	Games played	MPG	Minutes per game	FG%	Field-goal percentage
3FG%	3-point field-goal percentage	4P%	4-point field-goal percentage	FT%	Free-throw percentage
RPG	Rebounds per game	APG	Assists per game	SPG	Steals per game
BPG	Blocks per game	PPG	Points per game	**127**	Career high

As of the end of 2024–25 season

==== Season-by-season averages ====
Year	Team	GP	MPG	FG%	3P%	4P%	FT%	RPG	APG	SPG	BPG	PPG
2023–24	Terrafirma	**21**	**19.4**	.451	**.333**	—	**.684**	**4.8**	**.5**	.4	**1.8**	**6.7**
2024–25	Terrafirma	14	18.6	**.462**	.314	.000	.600	4.0	.4	.4	1.0	5.3
Career		35	19.1	.455	.326	.000	.667	4.5	.4	.4	1.5	6.1

=== MPBL ===
Legend
GP	Games played	MPG	Minutes per game
FG%	Field-goal percentage	3P%	3-point field-goal percentage	FT%	Free-throw percentage
RPG	Rebounds per game	APG	Assists per game	SPG	Steals per game
BPG	Blocks per game	PPG	Points per game	**Bold**	Career high

As of the end of 2023 season

==== Season-by-season averages ====
Year	Team	GP	GS	MPG	FG%	3P%	FT%	RPG	APG	SPG	BPG	PPG
2023	Muntinlupa	**11**	**9**	**23.1**	.354	.226	.565	**8.2**	**.9**	.1	**1.8**	**7.6**
2023	Nueva Ecija	5	2	13.9	**.375**	**.286**	**.778**	7.6	.2	**.4**	1.0	6.6
Career		16	11	20.2	.367	.237	.625	8.0	.7	.2	1.6	7.3
