= Stephen Holt (basketball) =

Filipino-American basketball player (born 1991)

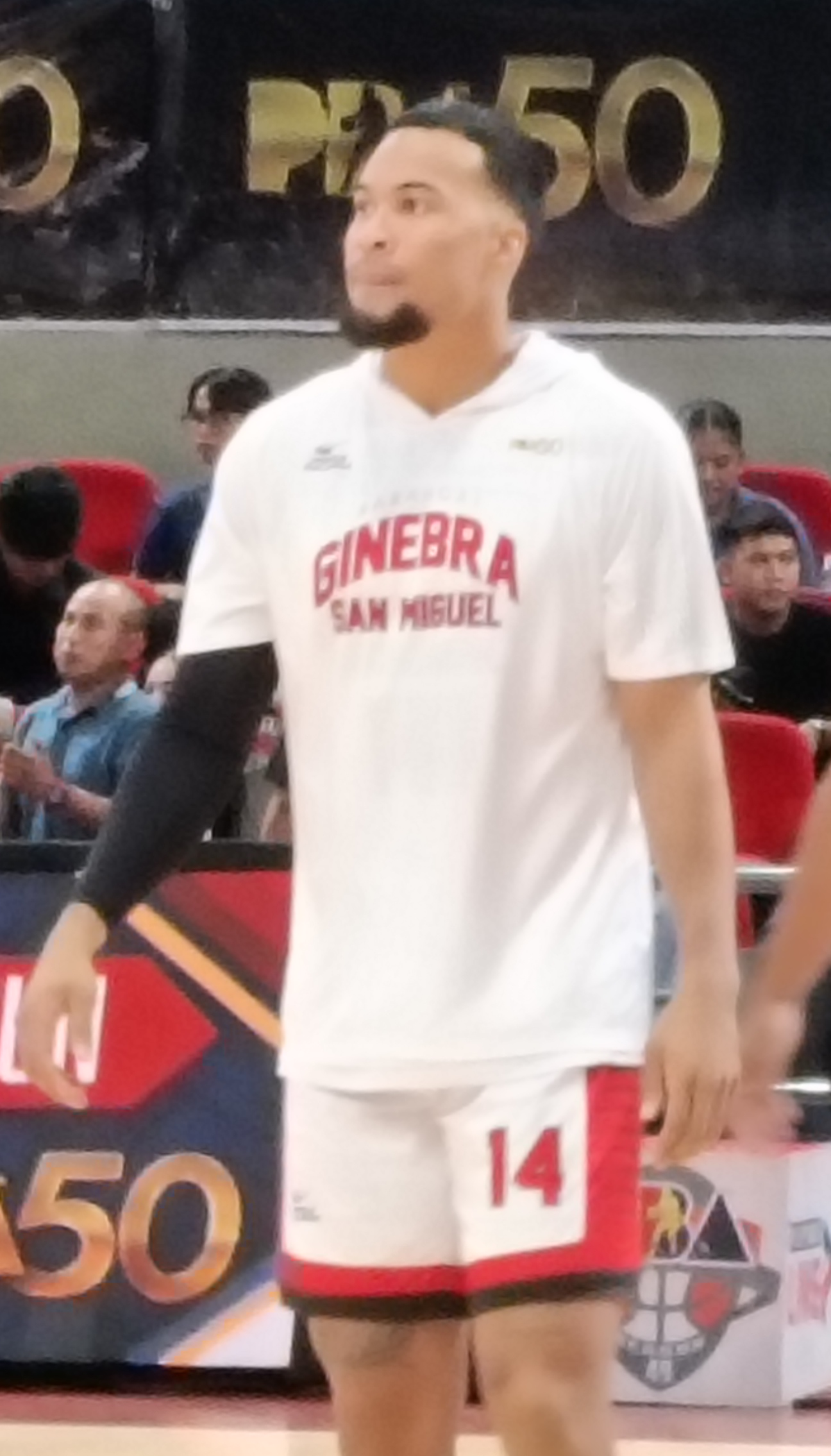
- Holt with Barangay Ginebra San Miguel in 2025

No. 14 – Barangay Ginebra San Miguel
- Position: Shooting guard / small forward
- League: PBA

Personal information
- Born: December 6, 1991 (age 34) Portland, Oregon, U.S.
- Listed height: 6 ft 4 in (1.93 m)
- Listed weight: 195 lb (88 kg)

Career information
- High school: Jesuit (Beaverton, Oregon)
- College: Saint Mary's (2010–2014)
- NBA draft: 2014: undrafted
- PBA draft: 2023: 1st round, 1st overall pick
- Drafted by: Terrafirma Dyip
- Playing career: 2014–present

Career history
- 2014–2015: Canton Charge
- 2015–2016: Melbourne United
- 2016: Andorra
- 2016–2017: Tecnyconta Zaragoza
- 2017: ČEZ Nymburk
- 2017–2018: Brisbane Bullets
- 2018: Stal Ostrów Wielkopolski
- 2018–2019: Astana
- 2019: Koper Primorska
- 2019–2020: Astana
- 2020–2023: CSM U Oradea
- 2023–2024: Terrafirma Dyip
- 2024–present: Barangay Ginebra San Miguel

Career highlights
- PBA champion (2026 Commissioner's); PBA All-Star (2026); 2× PBA Second Mythical Team (2024, 2025); PBA All-Defensive Team (2025); PBA Rookie of the Year (2024); PBA All-Rookie Team (2024); Czech League champion (2017); All-NBL Second Team (2016); First-team All-WCC (2014); WCC All-Freshman Team (2011)
- Stats at Basketball Reference

Stephen Jeffrey Carino Holt (born December 6, 1991) is an American-Filipino professional basketball player for the Barangay Ginebra San Miguel of the Philippine Basketball Association (PBA). The 6'4" guard played college basketball for Saint Mary's College of California before playing professionally in the NBA Development League, Australia, Spain, Poland, Kazakhstan, Slovenia, and Romania.

== High school career ==
Holt attended Jesuit High School in Beaverton, Oregon, where he was a two-time Oregon Division 6A State Player of the Year. As a junior in 2008–09, he averaged 8.1 points, 3.4 rebounds and 2.8 assists per game, while helping his team post a 25–3 overall record and an Oregon 6A State championship. He was subsequently named first-team All-State and first-team All-Metro League.

As a senior in 2009–10, Holt averaged 12.7 points, six rebounds and six assists per game to lead Jesuit to its second straight Oregon Division 6A state title after guiding his team to a 25–2 overall record during the season.

== College career ==
As a freshman at Saint Mary's in 2010–11, Holt was the West Coast Conference (WCC) leader in steals with 1.8 per game and registered the second-highest single-season total in SMC history with 61. He was in the starting line-up for his first career game, and set a Saint Mary's school record with nine steals, while also recording nine points and four assists. He started a further six games during the season, and in 34 total games, he averaged 6.2 points, 3.1 rebounds and 1.0 assists per game. He subsequently earned WCC All-Freshman Team honors.

As a sophomore in 2011–12, Holt started 27 of 28 appearances on the season and averaged 10.1 points, 4.7 rebounds, 3.2 assists and 1.8 steals per game. He was an honorable mention all-WCC selection by league coaches and he entered the top-10 in career steals at SMC with 110 in his first two seasons. After sustaining a knee injury on February 15 against Loyola Marymount, Holt missed five games in a row, games that included the final three of the regular season and the team's two WCC Tournament match-ups. He returned to face Purdue in the NCAA Tournament on March 16.

As a junior in 2012–13, Holt earned All-West Coast Conference honorable mention selection for the second-straight year. He started 27 of 31 appearances during the season, was second on the team in scoring with 11.6 points per game, third on the team in rebounding with 5.4 per game, registered 37 steals (1.2 per game), and was second on the team in minutes played with 32.4 per game.

As a senior in 2013–14, Holt started all 34 appearances for the Gaels, earned first-team all-WCC and NABC Division I all-District 9 selection, and was named SMC's Male Athlete of the Year. He averaged 15.2 points, 3.8 rebounds and 3.9 assists per game, and set a school record for minutes played in a season with 1,275. On February 22, he scored a career-high 35 points in a 76–54 win over Santa Clara. Holt finished tenth in career scoring at SMC with 1,370 points, and fell just one shy of the school record for career steals with 173 to finish second. He lettered four consecutive seasons at Saint Mary's and filled the role of team captain as a senior.

=== College statistics ===
Year	Team	GP	GS	MPG	FG%	3P%	FT%	RPG	APG	SPG	BPG	PPG
2010–11	Saint Mary's	34	7	22.9	.430	.342	.829	3.1	1.0	1.8	.1	6.2
2011–12	Saint Mary's	28	27	32.4	.497	.375	.767	4.7	3.2	1.8	.0	10.1
2012–13	Saint Mary's	31	27	32.4	.404	.342	.797	5.4	1.5	1.2	.0	11.6
2013–14	Saint Mary's	34	34	37.5	.451	.443	.831	3.8	3.9	.8	.0	15.2
Career		127	95	31.2	.443	.381	.808	4.2	2.4	1.4	.0	10.8

== Professional career ==
=== 2014–15 season ===
After going undrafted in the 2014 NBA draft, Holt joined the Atlanta Hawks for the 2014 NBA Summer League, where he averaged 8.6 points, 2.6 rebounds, 2.0 assists and 1.2 steals in five games. On August 1, he signed with MHP Riesen Ludwigsburg of Germany for the 2014–15 season. However, he rescinded his committed to the club in mid-September after receiving a training camp offer from the Cleveland Cavaliers. On October 1, he signed with the Cavaliers, only to be waived by the team on October 19 after appearing in two preseason games.

On November 2, 2014, Holt was acquired by the Canton Charge of the NBA Development League as an affiliate player of the Cavaliers. In his rookie season, Holt helped the Charge record a franchise-best 31 wins. He went on to help his team win their first round playoff match-up against the Sioux Falls Skyforce 2–1, making it through to the semi-finals where they lost to the Fort Wayne Mad Ants 2–0. In 54 games for the Charge in 2014–15, Holt averaged 11.1 points, 3.1 rebounds, 3.2 assists and 1.3 steals per game.

=== 2015–16 season ===
In July 2015, Holt re-joined the Atlanta Hawks for the 2015 NBA Summer League. In six games for the Hawks, he averaged 7.8 points, 1.8 rebounds, 1.0 assists and 1.5 steals per game.

On August 10, 2015, Holt signed with Melbourne United for the 2015–16 NBL season. After being named co-MVP of the NBL's preseason tournament, Holt made his debut for United in their opener on October 9, scoring 10 of his 17 points in the first quarter of the 99–84 win over the Townsville Crocodiles. On November 5, he scored a then season-high 23 points, all of which were scored in the first half, helping United defeat the Sydney Kings 105–94. Three days later, he helped United claim a 9–0 start to the season in a win over the New Zealand Breakers. He scored 21 points and made a game-winning foul shot to snatch an 87–86 victory. On January 29, 2016, he scored a season-high 33 points on 11-of-21 from the field and 7-of-11 from three-point range in a 91–85 overtime win over the Perth Wildcats. Holt helped United win the minor premiership with a first-place finish and an 18–10 record. However, in their semi-final series against the fourth-seeded New Zealand Breakers, United were swept 2–0 to bow out of the playoffs. Holt appeared in all 30 games for United in 2015–16, averaging 15.5 points, 3.6 rebounds and 3.6 assists per game. He subsequently earned selection to the All-NBL Second Team.

On February 23, 2016, Holt signed with MoraBanc Andorra for the rest of the 2015–16 ACB season. In 14 games for Andorra, he averaged 8.4 points, 1.4 rebounds and 1.1 assists per game.

=== 2016–17 season ===
On July 28, 2016, Holt signed with Tecnyconta Zaragoza for the 2016–17 ACB season. On January 31, 2017, he left Zaragoza after appearing in 17 games and signed with ČEZ Nymburk of the Czech NBL for the rest of the season. Nymburk finished the 2016–17 season as the first seed in the NBL with a 21–1 record and went on to lose just one game during their playoff run to clinch the NBL Championship. In 19 games for Nymburk, Holt averaged 6.1 points, 2.2 rebounds and 1.0 assists per game.

=== 2017–18 season ===
On June 6, 2017, Holt signed with the Brisbane Bullets for the 2017–18 NBL season, returning to Australia for a second stint. He appeared in all 28 games for the Bullets, averaging 9.8 points, 3.1 rebounds and 1.3 assists per game. While he was a genuine star for Melbourne United in the 2015–16 season, Holt was used more as a defensive stopper and a shooter and slasher from the wing for the Bullets in 2017–18.

On March 28, 2018, Holt signed with Stal Ostrów Wielkopolski of the Polish Basketball League. In 18 games, he averaged 9.3 points, 2.2 rebounds and 1.7 assists per game.

=== 2018–19 season ===
On May 23, 2018, Holt re-signed with the Brisbane Bullets for the 2018–19 NBL season. On December 4, 2018, he was released by the Bullets. In 11 games, he averaged 7.1 points, 1.4 rebounds and 1.3 assists per game.

On December 6, 2018, Holt signed with Kazakhstani club Astana for the rest of the season. In 21 games in the VTB United League, he averaged 11.3 points, 3.0 rebounds, 2.2 assists and 1.2 steals per game.

=== 2019–20 season ===
On June 26, 2019, Holt signed a two-year contract with Sixt Primorska of the Slovenian League. He appeared in 11 games in both the Slovenian League and ABA League, averaging 10 points per game in both.

In December 2019, Holt left Primorska and returned to Kazakhstani club Astana for the rest of the season.

=== 2020–21 season ===
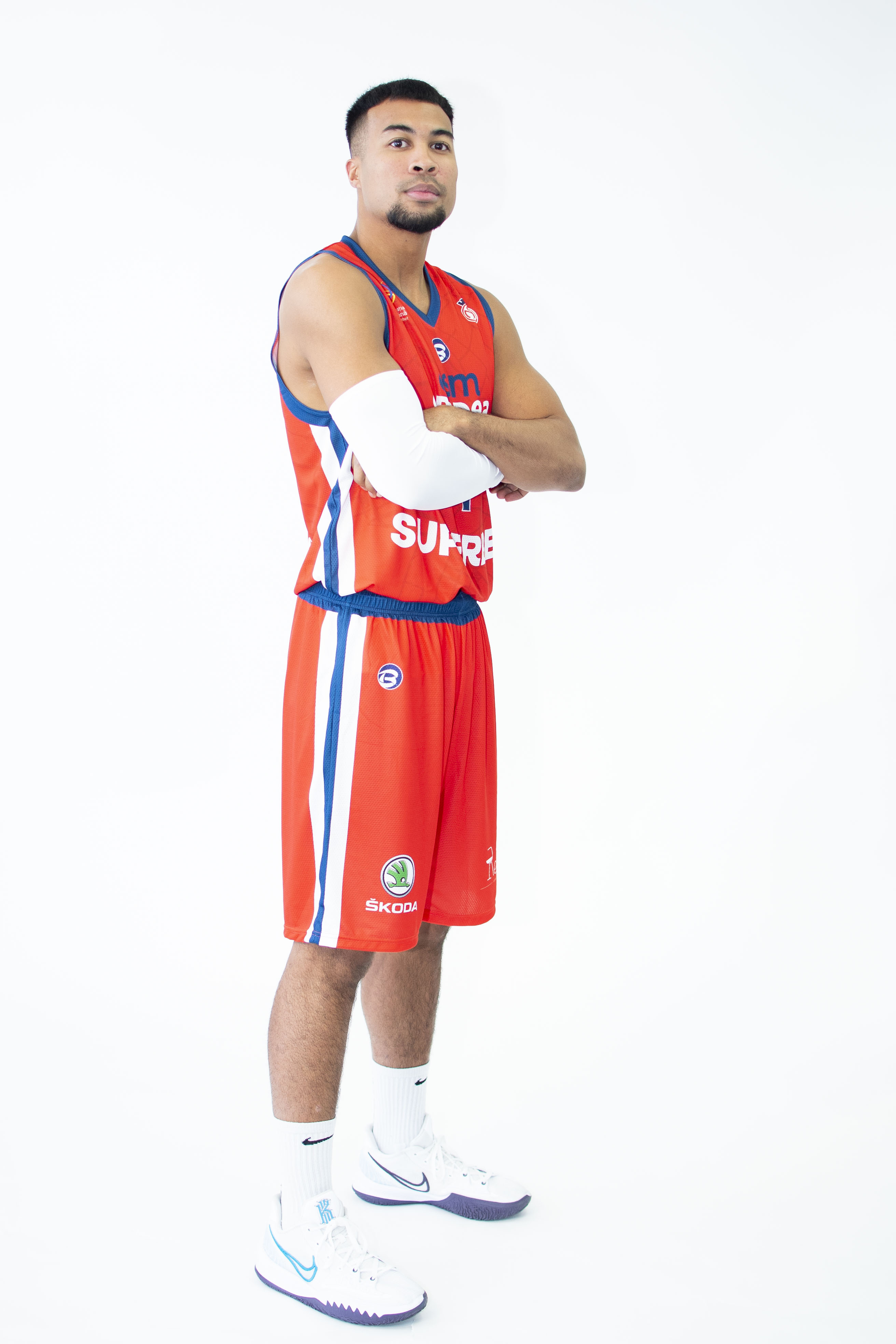
Holt in 2021

On August 18, 2020, Holt signed with CSM U Oradea of the Liga Națională in Romania. He helped Oradea win the bronze medal in the Europe Cup.

=== 2021–22 season ===
In July 2021, Holt re-signed with CSM U Oradea for the 2021–22 season.

=== 2022–23 season ===
In July 2022, Holt re-signed with CSM U Oradea for the 2022–23 season.

=== 2023–24 season ===
In September 2023, Holt applied for the PBA season 48 draft, where he was selected first overall by the Terrafirma Dyip. On October 4, 2023, he signed a two-year rookie contract with the team.

=== 2024–25 season ===
On July 13, 2024, Holt, along with Isaac Go and a 2023 first-round pick, was traded to the Barangay Ginebra San Miguel for Stanley Pringle, Christian Standhardinger, and a 2023 first-round pick.

On October 4, 2025, Holt signed a three-year contract extension with Barangay Ginebra.

== PBA career statistics ==
Legend
GP	Games played	MPG	Minutes per game	FG%	Field-goal percentage
3FG%	3-point field-goal percentage	4P%	4-point field-goal percentage	FT%	Free-throw percentage
RPG	Rebounds per game	APG	Assists per game	SPG	Steals per game
BPG	Blocks per game	PPG	Points per game	127	Career high

As of the end of 2024–25 season

=== Season-by-season averages ===
Year	Team	GP	MPG	FG%	3P%	4P%	FT%	RPG	APG	SPG	BPG	PPG
2023–24	Terrafirma	24	39.9	.451	.338	—	.811	6.9	5.5	1.9	—	17.0
2024–25	Barangay Ginebra	70	35.6	.400	.348	.091	.853	5.1	3.0	1.0	.0	11.6
Career		94	36.7	.417	.345	.091	.840	5.6	3.6	1.2	.0	13.0

== Personal life ==
Holt has a wife and a child. His father, Greg, is American, while his mother, Jackie, is Filipino. His father played college basketball for the University of Portland, while his sister played college soccer for Saint Mary's.

Holt acquired a Philippine passport in June 2023, which made him eligible to play in the Philippine Basketball Association as a local player.
