= 2025–26 Rain or Shine Elasto Painters season =

- Head coach: Yeng Guiao
- General manager: Mamerto Mondragon; Jireh Ibañes (assistant)
- Governors: Mamerto Mondragon; Edison Oribiana (alternate)
- Owner: Asian Coatings Philippines, Inc.

Philippine Cup results
- Record: 8–3 (72.7%)
- Place: 2nd
- Playoff finish: Quarterfinalist (lost to Meralco with twice-to-beat advantage)

Commissioner's Cup results
- Record: 9–3 (75%)
- Place: 3rd
- Playoff finish: Semifinalist (lost to Barangay Ginebra, 2–4)

Governors' Cup results
- Record: 6–4 (60%)
- Place: 2nd in group B
- Playoff finish: Quarterfinalist (lost to Converge, 1–3)

Rain or Shine Elasto Painters seasons

The 2025–26 Rain or Shine Elasto Painters season was the 19th season of the franchise in the Philippine Basketball Association (PBA).

== Key dates ==
- September 7, 2025: The PBA season 50 draft was held at the SM Mall of Asia Music Hall in Pasay.
- October 9, 2025: Gabe Norwood announced that he would retire after the 2025–26 PBA Philippine Cup.
- December 29, 2025: Gabe Norwood officially retired after the Rain or Shine was eliminated by the Meralco Bolts in a do-or-die game of the quarterfinal round.
- April 10, 2026: Gabe Norwood's jersey number (#5) was retired by the team during the halftime of their game against the Converge FiberXers.

== Draft picks ==
Round	Pick	Player	Position	Place of birth	College
1	10	Christian Manaytay	PF/C	Philippines	UST
1	12	Jun Roque	SF	Philippines	Letran
2	20	Mark Omega	C	Philippines	Letran
2	22	Deo Cuajao	SG	Philippines	Letran
2	24	Joshua David	PG	Philippines	De La Salle
3	34	Cole Micek	PG	United States	St. Francis
4	45	Kyle Tolentino	SG/SF	United States	Letran
5	55	MJ dela Virgen	PG	Philippines	JRU

== Roster ==
Rain or Shine Elasto Painters roster
Players
Coaches

Pos.	#	POB	Name	Height	Weight	DOB (YYYY–MM–DD)	From
F	0	(United States)	Caelan Tiongson	6 ft 5 in (1.96 m)	205 lb (93 kg)	1992–05–07	Biola
G	1	(Philippines)	Adrian Nocum	6 ft 0 in (1.83 m)	167 lb (76 kg)	1999−08−10	Mapúa
G	2	(Sweden)	Felix Pangilinan-Lemetti	6 ft 1 in (1.85 m)	190 lb (86 kg)	1999–02–10	Salt Lake CC
F/C	3	(United States)	Aaron Fuller (GI)	6 ft 6 in (1.98 m)	235 lb (107 kg)	1989−12−03	USC
F	4	(Philippines)	Mike Malonzo	6 ft 2 in (1.88 m)		1999−10−23	National-U
G	8	(Philippines)	Anton Asistio	5 ft 10 in (1.78 m)	175 lb (79 kg)	1995–06–02	Ateneo
G	9	(Philippines)	Joshua David (R)	6 ft 0 in (1.83 m)	180 lb (82 kg)	2000–01–06	De La Salle
G	11	(United States)	Stanley Pringle	6 ft 1 in (1.85 m)	185 lb (84 kg)	1987–03–05	Penn State
F	12	(Philippines)	Jun Roque (injured) (R)	6 ft 4 in (1.93 m)		2001−10−17	Letran
G	14	(Philippines)	Andrei Caracut	5 ft 10 in (1.78 m)	180 lb (82 kg)	1996–01–30	De La Salle
C	21	(United States)	Keith Datu (injured)	6 ft 8 in (2.03 m)	220 lb (100 kg)	1996–03–19	Chico State
F	22	(Philippines)	Jhonard Clarito	6 ft 2 in (1.88 m)	187 lb (85 kg)	1996–04–03	De Ocampo
C	24	(United States)	Luis Villegas	6 ft 7 in (2.01 m)	215 lb (98 kg)	1997−09−05	UE
F/C	25	(Philippines)	Leonard Santillan	6 ft 4 in (1.93 m)	210 lb (95 kg)	1996–03–05	De La Salle
C	28	(Philippines)	Beau Belga	6 ft 5 in (1.96 m)	245 lb (111 kg)	1986–11–30	Philippine Christian
G	29	(Philippines)	Deo Cuajao (R)	6 ft 1 in (1.85 m)		2001−01−30	Letran
F/C	44	(Philippines)	Christian Manaytay (R)	6 ft 5 in (1.96 m)		1999−11−02	UST

Head coach

- (Philippines) Yeng Guiao

Assistant coach(es)

- (Philippines) Caloy Garcia (1st assistant)
- (Philippines) Mike Buendia
- (Philippines) Ricky Umayam

Team manager

- (Philippines) Mamerto Mondragon^{[a]}
- (Philippines) Jireh Ibañes (assistant)

Legend

- (C) Team captain
- (CI) Commissioner's Cup Import
- (GI) Governors' Cup Import
- (EI) EASL Import
- (DP) Unsigned draft pick
- (FA) Free agent
- (IN) Inactive
- (S) Suspended
- (R) Rookie
- Injured

Roster

- ^{a} also serves as Rain or Shine's board governor.

== Philippine Cup ==
=== Eliminations ===
==== Standings ====
Pos	Team	W	L	PCT	GB	Qualification
1	San Miguel Beermen	9	2	.818	—	Twice-to-beat in the quarterfinals
2	Rain or Shine Elasto Painters	8	3	.727 (Note: Head-to-head record: Rain or Shine 1–0 TNT)	1	Twice-to-beat in the quarterfinals
3	TNT Tropang 5G	8	3	.727	1	Twice-to-beat in the quarterfinals
4	Converge FiberXers	7	4	.636 (Note: Head-to-head record: Converge 1–0 Barangay Ginebra)	2	Twice-to-beat in the quarterfinals
5	Barangay Ginebra San Miguel	7	4	.636	2	Twice-to-win in the quarterfinals
6	Magnolia Chicken Timplados Hotshots	6	5	.545 (Note: Head-to-head quotient: Magnolia 1.09, Meralco 0.99, NLEX 0.93)	3	Twice-to-win in the quarterfinals
7	Meralco Bolts	6	5	.545	3	Twice-to-win in the quarterfinals
8	NLEX Road Warriors	6	5	.545	3	Twice-to-win in the quarterfinals
9	Titan Ultra Giant Risers	4	7	.364	5	
10	Phoenix Fuel Masters	3	8	.273	6	
11	Blackwater Bossing	1	10	.091 (Note: Head-to-head record: Blackwater 1–0 Terrafirma)	8	
12	Terrafirma Dyip	1	10	.091	8	

Source: PBA.ph
Rules for classification: 1) winning percentage; 2) head-to-head goal average (quotient); 3) head-to-head record; 4) overall quotient; 5) coin toss

==== Game log ====
2025–26 PBA Philippine Cup game log
Total: 8–3
October: 4–1

Game	Date	Opponent	Score	High points	High rebounds	High assists	Location Attendance	Record
1	October 11, 2025	Meralco	W 96–95 (OT)	Caelan Tiongson (23)	Caelan Tiongson (10)	Adrian Nocum (4)	Ynares Center Montalban	1–0
2	October 19, 2025	San Miguel	L 93–111	Adrian Nocum (17)	Caelan Tiongson (13)	Porter, Pringle (4)	Ynares Center Montalban	1–1
3	October 24, 2025	Blackwater	W 110–100	Keith Datu (20)	Keith Datu (8)	Gian Mamuyac (5)	Ynares Center Antipolo	2–1
4	October 26, 2025	Titan Ultra	W 112–111	Adrian Nocum (24)	Gabe Norwood (12)	Gabe Norwood (7)	Ynares Center Antipolo	3–1
5	October 31, 2025	Terrafirma	W 106–91	Leonard Santillan (26)	Gabe Norwood (10)	Felix Pangilinan-Lemetti (6)	Ynares Center Antipolo	4–1

November: 2–1

Game	Date	Opponent	Score	High points	High rebounds	High assists	Location Attendance	Record
6	November 5, 2025	Phoenix	W 91–80	Gian Mamuyac (22)	Leonard Santillan (7)	Felix Pangilinan-Lemetti (6)	Ninoy Aquino Stadium	5–1
7	November 8, 2025	NLEX	L 91–105	Jhonard Clarito (26)	Mike Malonzo (12)	Jhonard Clarito (6)	Ynares Center Antipolo	5–2
8	November 15, 2025	TNT	W 91–89	Gabe Norwood (16)	Norwood, Santillan (9)	Gabe Norwood (5)	Aquilino Q. Pimentel Jr. International Convention Center	6–2

December: 2–1

Game	Date	Opponent	Score	High points	High rebounds	High assists	Location Attendance	Record
9	December 7, 2025	Converge	W 90–84	Leonard Santillan (16)	Mike Malonzo (10)	Adrian Nocum (4)	Ynares Center Montalban	7–2
10	December 15, 2025	Magnolia	W 101–92	Jhonard Clarito (21)	Jhonard Clarito (11)	Gian Mamuyac (5)	Khalifa Sports City Arena	8–2
11	December 17, 2025	Barangay Ginebra	L 100–102	Felix Pangilinan-Lemetti (14)	Jhonard Clarito (10)	Felix Pangilinan-Lemetti (5)	Khalifa Sports City Arena	8–3

=== Playoffs ===
==== Bracket ====
Quarterfinals (Top 4 twice-to-beat)
1	San Miguel	101
8	NLEX	94
4	Converge	85	98
5	Barangay Ginebra	105	99*
2	Rain or Shine	79	89
7	Meralco	96	98
3	TNT	118
6	Magnolia	109

Semifinals (Best-of-7)
1	San Miguel	4
5	Barangay Ginebra	2
7	Meralco	1
3	TNT	4

Finals (Best-of-7)
1	San Miguel	4
3	TNT	2

*Game went into overtime

==== Game log ====
2025–26 PBA Philippine Cup playoffs game log
Total: 0–2
Quarterfinals: 0–2

Game	Date	Opponent	Score	High points	High rebounds	High assists	Location Attendance	Series
1	December 27, 2025	Meralco	L 79–96	Adrian Nocum (17)	Gabe Norwood (9)	Caelan Tiongson (3)	Smart Araneta Coliseum	0–1
2	December 29, 2025	Meralco	L 89–98	Adrian Nocum (29)	Caelan Tiongson (13)	Andrei Caracut (4)	Smart Araneta Coliseum	0–2

== Commissioner's Cup ==
=== Eliminations ===
==== Standings ====
Pos	Team	W	L	PCT	GB	Qualification
1	NLEX Road Warriors	10	2	.833	—	Twice-to-beat in the quarterfinals
2	Barangay Ginebra San Miguel	9	3	.750 (Note: Head-to-head record: Barangay Ginebra 1–0 Rain or Shine)	1	Twice-to-beat in the quarterfinals
3	Rain or Shine Elasto Painters	9	3	.750	1	Twice-to-beat in the quarterfinals
4	Meralco Bolts	8	4	.667	2	Twice-to-beat in the quarterfinals
5	Magnolia Chicken Timplados Hotshots	7	5	.583 (Note: Head-to-head record: Magnolia 1–0 San Miguel)	3	Twice-to-win in the quarterfinals
6	San Miguel Beermen	7	5	.583	3	Twice-to-win in the quarterfinals
7	Phoenix Super LPG Fuel Masters	6	6	.500 (Note: Head-to-head record: Phoenix Super LPG 1–0 TNT)	4	Twice-to-win in the quarterfinals
8	TNT Tropang 5G	6	6	.500	4	Twice-to-win in the quarterfinals
9	Converge FiberXers	5	7	.417	5	
10	Terrafirma Dyip	4	8	.333	6	
11	Macau Black Knights (G)	3	9	.250	7	
12	Titan Ultra Giant Risers	2	10	.167 (Note: Head-to-head record: Titan Ultra 1–0 Blackwater)	8	
13	Blackwater Bossing	2	10	.167	8	

Source: PBA.ph
Rules for classification: 1) winning percentage; 2) head-to-head goal average (quotient); 3) head-to-head record; 4) overall quotient; 5) coin toss
(G) Guests

==== Game log ====
2026 PBA Commissioner's Cup game log
Total: 9–3
March: 4–0

Game	Date	Opponent	Score	High points	High rebounds	High assists	Location Attendance	Record
1	March 14, 2026	Macau	W 116–109	Jaylen Johnson (29)	Jaylen Johnson (24)	Caelan Tiongson (9)	Ynares Center Montalban	1–0
2	March 20, 2026	TNT	W 112–109	Jaylen Johnson (33)	Clarito, Nocum (11)	Felix Lemetti (4)	Smart Araneta Coliseum	2–0
3	March 27, 2026	Meralco	W 109–102	Felix Lemetti (23)	Jhonard Clarito (9)	Gian Mamuyac (6)	Smart Araneta Coliseum	3–0
4	March 31, 2026	Blackwater	W 151–95	Andrei Caracut (22)	Leonard Santillan (10)	Clarito, Johnson, Mamuyac, Nocum (4)	Ninoy Aquino Stadium	4–0

April: 4–2

Game	Date	Opponent	Score	High points	High rebounds	High assists	Location Attendance	Record
5	April 8, 2026	San Miguel	W 116–112	Jaylen Johnson (24)	Leonard Santillan (12)	Andrei Caracut (7)	Ninoy Aquino Stadium	5–0
6	April 10, 2026	Converge	W 120–111	Jaylen Johnson (35)	Jaylen Johnson (21)	Adrian Nocum (4)	SM Mall of Asia Arena	6–0
7	April 15, 2026	Terrafirma	W 124–117	Asistio, Johnson (18)	Jaylen Johnson (12)	Jaylen Johnson (10)	Ynares Center Antipolo	7–0
8	April 21, 2026	Phoenix Super LPG	L 83–87	Adrian Nocum (20)	Jaylen Johnson (19)	Jaylen Johnson (7)	Ninoy Aquino Stadium	7–1
9	April 25, 2026	Magnolia	W 91–82	Johnson, Mamuyac (25)	Jaylen Johnson (14)	Gian Mamuyac (5)	Ninoy Aquino Stadium	8–1
10	April 29, 2026	NLEX	L 90–92	Jaylen Johnson (17)	Jaylen Johnson (15)	Jaylen Johnson (8)	Ninoy Aquino Stadium	8–2

May: 1–1

Game	Date	Opponent	Score	High points	High rebounds	High assists	Location Attendance	Record
11	May 3, 2026	Barangay Ginebra	L 90–114	Jaylen Johnson (16)	Jaylen Johnson (15)	Jaylen Johnson (6)	Smart Araneta Coliseum	8–3
12	May 8, 2026	Titan Ultra	W 142–131	Jaylen Johnson (31)	Leonard Santillan (12)	David, Johnson (7)	Ninoy Aquino Stadium	9–3

=== Playoffs ===
==== Bracket ====
Quarterfinals (Top 4 twice-to-beat)
1	NLEX	93	112
8	TNT	96	118
4	Meralco	89	105
5	Magnolia	95	102*
2	Barangay Ginebra	112
7	Phoenix Super LPG	81
3	Rain or Shine	113
6	San Miguel	104

Semifinals (Best-of-7)
8	TNT	4
4	Meralco	2
2	Barangay Ginebra	4
3	Rain or Shine	2

Finals (Best-of-7)
8	TNT	3
2	Barangay Ginebra	4

*Game went into overtime

==== Game log ====
2026 PBA Commissioner's Cup playoffs game log
Total: 3–4
Quarterfinals: 1–0

Game	Date	Opponent	Score	High points	High rebounds	High assists	Location Attendance	Series
1	May 15, 2026	San Miguel	W 113–104	Andrei Caracut (29)	Jaylen Johnson (12)	Caelan Tiongson (7)	Ynares Center Antipolo	1–0

Semifinals: 2–4

Game	Date	Opponent	Score	High points	High rebounds	High assists	Location Attendance	Series
1	May 20, 2026	Barangay Ginebra	W 115–111	Jaylen Johnson (40)	Jaylen Johnson (19)	Gian Mamuyac (5)	Ynares Center Antipolo; 10,412	1–0
2	May 22, 2026	Barangay Ginebra	L 101–109	Adrian Nocum (20)	Jaylen Johnson (19)	Jaylen Johnson (7)	SM Mall of Asia Arena; 11,522	1–1
3	May 24, 2026	Barangay Ginebra	L 98–103	Johnson, Tiongson (23)	Jaylen Johnson (21)	Jaylen Johnson (8)	SM Mall of Asia Arena; 13,524	1–2
4	May 27, 2026	Barangay Ginebra	W 97–85	Jaylen Johnson (13)	Jaylen Johnson (12)	Johnson, Mamuyac (4)	Smart Araneta Coliseum; 14,615	2–2
5	May 29, 2026	Barangay Ginebra	L 104–111	Adrian Nocum (25)	Jaylen Johnson (14)	Caelan Tiongson (6)	Smart Araneta Coliseum; 11,779	2–3
6	May 31, 2026	Barangay Ginebra	L 107–118	Jaylen Johnson (27)	Jaylen Johnson (14)	Adrian Nocum (7)	Ynares Center Antipolo; 11,321	2–4

== Governors' Cup ==
=== Eliminations ===
==== Standings ====
Pos	Team	W	L	PCT	GB	Qualification
1	Magnolia Chicken Timplados Hotshots	7	3	.700	—	Quarterfinals
2	Rain or Shine Elasto Painters	6	4	.600	1	Quarterfinals
3	Barangay Ginebra San Miguel	5	5	.500 (Note: Head-to-head quotient: Barangay Ginebra 1.08, Phoenix Super LPG 0.92)	2	Quarterfinals
4	Phoenix Super LPG Fuel Masters	5	5	.500	2	Quarterfinals
5	Meralco Bolts	4	6	.400	3	
6	Blackwater Bossing	3	7	.300	4	

Source: PBA.ph
Rules for classification: 1) winning percentage; 2) head-to-head quotient (goal average); 3) head-to-head record; 4) coin toss

==== Game log ====
2026 PBA Governors' Cup game log
Total: 6–4
July: 3–2

Game	Date	Opponent	Score	High points	High rebounds	High assists	Location Attendance	Record
1	July 11, 2026	Blackwater	L 108–131	Aaron Fuller (38)	Aaron Fuller (15)	Mamuyac, Nocum (6)	Ynares Center Montalban	0–1
2	July 18, 2026	Meralco	L 114–122	Aaron Fuller (28)	Aaron Fuller (10)	Adrian Nocum (7)	Ynares Center Antipolo	0–2
3	July 21, 2026	Phoenix Super LPG	W 105–98	Aaron Fuller (28)	Aaron Fuller (16)	Adrian Nocum (8)	Ynares Center Antipolo	1–2
4	July 26, 2026	Barangay Ginebra	W 110–99	Aaron Fuller (37)	Aaron Fuller (12)	Adrian Nocum (10)	Smart Araneta Coliseum	2–2
5	July 31, 2026	Magnolia	W 98–97	Adrian Nocum (31)	Aaron Fuller (12)	Clarito, Nocum (4)	SM Mall of Asia Arena	3–2

August: 1–0

Game	Date	Opponent	Score	High points	High rebounds	High assists	Location Attendance	Record
6	August 2, 2026	Meralco	W 85–83	Aaron Fuller (25)	Aaron Fuller (13)	Adrian Nocum (8)	Smart Araneta Coliseum	4–2

October: 2–2

Game	Date	Opponent	Score	High points	High rebounds	High assists	Location Attendance	Record
7	October 9, 2026	Barangay Ginebra	L 111–129	Aaron Fuller (23)	Aaron Fuller (13)	Caracut, Fuller (4)	Ninoy Aquino Stadium	4–3
8	October 17, 2026	Blackwater	W 125–123	Aaron Fuller (24)	Aaron Fuller (19)	Caracut, Fuller, Pangilinan-Lemetti, Tiongson (3)	Ynares Center Antipolo	5–3
9	October 21, 2026	Magnolia	L 103–107	Adrian Nocum (25)	Leonard Santillan (8)	Belga, Clarito (4)	Ynares Center Antipolo	5–4
10	October 23, 2026	Phoenix Super LPG	W 133–103	Clarito, Fuller (18)	Jhonard Clarito (11)	Luis Villegas (7)	Ynares Center Antipolo	6–4

=== Playoffs ===
==== Bracket ====
Quarterfinals (Best-of-5)
A1	NLEX	3
B4	Phoenix Super LPG	0
B2	Rain or Shine	1
A3	Converge	3
B1	Magnolia	0
A4	TNT	3
A2	San Miguel	2
B3	Barangay Ginebra	2

Semifinals (Best-of-5)
A1	NLEX	0
A3	Converge	0
A4	TNT	0

Finals (Best-of-7)

==== Game log ====
2026 PBA Governors' Cup playoffs game log
Total: 1–3
Quarterfinals: 1–3

Game	Date	Opponent	Score	High points	High rebounds	High assists	Location Attendance	Series
1	October 27, 2026	Converge	W 124–120	Aaron Fuller (33)	Aaron Fuller (14)	Adrian Nocum (9)	Smart Araneta Coliseum	1–0
2	October 30, 2026	Converge	L 125–130	Aaron Fuller (26)	Aaron Fuller (15)	Adrian Nocum (18)	Ninoy Aquino Stadium	1–1
3	November 3, 2026	Converge	L 89–105	Felix Pangilinan-Lemetti (18)	Aaron Fuller (13)	Adrian Nocum (11)	Dasmariñas Arena	1–2
4	November 6, 2026	Converge	L 109–120	Aaron Fuller (23)	Aaron Fuller (10)	Adrian Nocum (10)	Smart Araneta Coliseum	1–3

== Transactions ==
=== Free agency ===
==== Signings ====
Player	Date signed	Contract amount	Contract length	Former team	Ref.
Stanley Pringle	July 15, 2025	Not disclosed	2 years	Terrafirma Dyip	
Beau Belga	January 19, 2026	Not disclosed	1 year	Re-signed	
Jun Roque	June 23, 2026	Not disclosed	1 year	Re-signed	
Anton Asistio	June 23, 2026	Not disclosed	1 year	Re-signed	
Jhonard Clarito	June 26, 2026	Not disclosed	3 years	Re-signed	
Luis Villegas	September 28, 2026	Not disclosed	2 years	Re-signed	
Caelan Tiongson	October 5, 2026	Not disclosed	2 years	Re-signed	
Deo Cuajao	October 14, 2026	Not disclosed	2 years	Re-signed	

==== Subtractions ====
Player	Number	Position	Reason	New team	Ref.
Francis Escandor	7	Small forward / Shooting guard	Released	Phoenix Fuel Masters	
Gabe Norwood	10, 5	Small forward / Power forward	Retiring		
Kris Porter	41	Center	Going to other league	GenSan Warriors (MPBL)	
Shaun Ildefonso	10	Small forward / Shooting guard	Contract not renewed	Abra Weavers (MPBL)	

=== Trades ===
==== Pre-season ====
October 2025
October 2, 2025	To Rain or Shine 2028 (S52) Converge second-round pick	To Converge Rights of Mark Omega

==== Governors' Cup ====
July 2026
July 16, 2026	To Rain or Shine 2029 (S53) Phoenix Super LPG first-round pick	To Phoenix Super LPG Gian Mamuyac; 2029 (S53) Rain or Shine second-round pick

=== Recruited imports ===
Tournament	Name	Debuted	Last game	Record	Ref.
Commissioner's Cup	Jaylen Johnson	March 14, 2026 (vs. Macau)	May 31, 2026 (vs. Barangay Ginebra)	11–7	
Governors' Cup	Aaron Fuller	July 11, 2026 (vs. Blackwater)	November 6, 2026 (vs. Converge)	7–7	
