= 2024–25 Rain or Shine Elasto Painters season =

- Head coach: Yeng Guiao
- General manager: Mamerto Mondragon; Jireh Ibañes (assistant)
- Owner: Asian Coatings Philippines, Inc.

Governors' Cup results
- Record: 7–3 (70%)
- Place: 1st in group B
- Playoff finish: Semifinalist (lost to TNT, 1–4)

Commissioner's Cup results
- Record: 7–5 (58.3%)
- Place: 6th
- Playoff finish: Semifinalist (lost to TNT, 1–4)

Philippine Cup results
- Record: 6–5 (54.5%)
- Place: 7th
- Playoff finish: Semifinalist (lost to TNT, 2–4)

Rain or Shine Elasto Painters seasons

The 2024–25 Rain or Shine Elasto Painters season was the 18th season of the franchise in the Philippine Basketball Association (PBA).

== Key dates ==
- July 14: The PBA season 49 draft was held at the Glorietta Activity Center in Makati.

== Draft picks ==
Round	Pick	Player	Position	Place of birth	College
1	7	Caelan Tiongson	F	USA	Biola
1	8	Felix Pangilinan-Lemetti	G	Sweden	Salt Lake CC
2	13	Francis Escandor	F	Philippines	De La Salle
2	16	Mike Malonzo	F	Philippines	NU
2	20	Miguel Corteza	F	Philippines	Benilde
3	32	Darwish Bederi	C/F	Philippines	UP

== Roster ==
2024–25 Rain or Shine Elasto Painters roster
Players
Coaches

Pos.	#	POB	Name	Height	Weight	DOB (YYYY–MM–DD)	From
F	0	(United States)	Caelan Tiongson (R)	6 ft 5 in (1.96 m)	205 lb (93 kg)	1992–05–07	Biola
G	1	(Philippines)	Adrian Nocum	6 ft 0 in (1.83 m)	167 lb (76 kg)	1999−08−10	Mapúa
G	2	(Sweden)	Felix Pangilinan-Lemetti (injured) (R)	6 ft 1 in (1.85 m)		1999–02–10	Salt Lake CC
G	3	(Philippines)	Gian Mamuyac	6 ft 2 in (1.88 m)	165 lb (75 kg)	1999–03–05	Ateneo
F	4	(Philippines)	Mike Malonzo (R)	6 ft 2 in (1.88 m)		1999−10−23	National-U
F	5	(United States)	Gabe Norwood	6 ft 6 in (1.98 m)	190 lb (86 kg)	1985–02–09	George Mason
G/F	7	(Philippines)	Francis Escandor (R)	6 ft 3 in (1.91 m)		1999–03–18	De La Salle
G	8	(Philippines)	Anton Asistio	5 ft 10 in (1.78 m)	175 lb (79 kg)	1995–06–02	Ateneo
G/F	10	(Philippines)	Shaun Ildefonso	6 ft 2 in (1.88 m)	198 lb (90 kg)	1997–09–30	National-U
G	14	(Philippines)	Andrei Caracut	5 ft 10 in (1.78 m)	180 lb (82 kg)	1996–01–30	De La Salle
F	16	(Philippines)	Mark Borboran	6 ft 4 in (1.93 m)	185 lb (84 kg)	1984–11–01	UE
C	21	(United States)	Keith Datu	6 ft 8 in (2.03 m)	220 lb (100 kg)	1996–03–19	Chico State
F	22	(Philippines)	Jhonard Clarito	6 ft 2 in (1.88 m)	187 lb (85 kg)	1996–04–03	De Ocampo
C	24	(United States)	Luis Villegas (injured)	6 ft 7 in (2.01 m)	215 lb (98 kg)	1997−09−05	UE
F/C	25	(Philippines)	Leonard Santillan	6 ft 4 in (1.93 m)	210 lb (95 kg)	1996–03–05	De La Salle
C	28	(Philippines)	Beau Belga (C / FA)	6 ft 5 in (1.96 m)	245 lb (111 kg)	1986–11–30	Philippine Christian
C	41	(Philippines)	Kris Porter	6 ft 5 in (1.96 m)	195 lb (88 kg)	1994–09–02	Ateneo

Head coach

- (Philippines) Yeng Guiao

Assistant coach(es)

- (Philippines) Caloy Garcia (1st assistant)
- (Philippines) Mike Buendia
- (United States) Gabe Norwood
- (Philippines) Ricky Umayam

Team manager

- (Philippines) Mamerto Mondragon^{[a]}
- (Philippines) Jireh Ibañes (assistant)

Legend

- (C) Team captain
- (CI) Commissioner's Cup Import
- (GI) Governors' Cup Import
- (EI) EASL Import
- (DP) Unsigned draft pick
- (FA) Free agent
- (IN) Inactive
- (S) Suspended
- (R) Rookie
- Injured

Roster

- ^{a} also serves as Rain or Shine's board governor.

== Governors' Cup ==
=== Eliminations ===
==== Group B Standings ====
Pos	Team	W	L	PCT	GB	Qualification
1	Rain or Shine Elasto Painters	7	3	.700	—	Quarterfinals
2	San Miguel Beermen	6	4	.600 (Note: Head-to-head record: San Miguel 1–1 Barangay Ginebra (San Miguel 1.23, Barangay Ginebra 0.82))	1	Quarterfinals
3	Barangay Ginebra San Miguel	6	4	.600	1	Quarterfinals
4	NLEX Road Warriors	5	5	.500 (Note: Head-to-head record: NLEX 1–1 Blackwater (NLEX 1.03, Blackwater 0.97))	2	Quarterfinals
5	Blackwater Bossing	5	5	.500	2	
6	Phoenix Fuel Masters	1	9	.100	6	

Source: PBA.ph
Rules for classification: 1) winning percentage; 2) if two teams are tied, head-to-head record, if three or more teams are tied, head-to-head goal average (quotient); 3) overall quotient; 4) coin toss

==== Game log ====
2024 PBA Governors' Cup game log
Total: 7–3
August: 4–0

Game	Date	Opponent	Score	High points	High rebounds	High assists	Location Attendance	Record
1	August 20	Blackwater	W 110–97	Aaron Fuller (24)	Aaron Fuller (19)	Andrei Caracut (6)	Smart Araneta Coliseum	1–0
2	August 24	Barangay Ginebra	W 73–64	Aaron Fuller (16)	Aaron Fuller (23)	Jhonard Clarito (4)	Candon City Arena	2–0
3	August 28	NLEX	W 124–105	Jhonard Clarito (24)	Aaron Fuller (20)	Andrei Caracut (7)	Ninoy Aquino Stadium	3–0
4	August 30	Phoenix	W 116–99	Aaron Fuller (28)	Aaron Fuller (22)	Caracut, Tiongson (4)	Ninoy Aquino Stadium	4–0

September: 3–3

Game	Date	Opponent	Score	High points	High rebounds	High assists	Location Attendance	Record
5	September 5	San Miguel	L 112–113	Felix Pangilinan-Lemetti (28)	Aaron Fuller (19)	Gian Mamuyac (5)	Ninoy Aquino Stadium	4–1
6	September 10	Phoenix	W 122–107	Fuller, Nocum (16)	Aaron Fuller (11)	Caracut, Nocum (5)	Ninoy Aquino Stadium	5–1
7	September 13	Barangay Ginebra	L 102–124	Aaron Fuller (28)	Aaron Fuller (11)	Andrei Caracut (4)	Smart Araneta Coliseum	5–2
8	September 17	NLEX	W 123–114 (OT)	Anton Asistio (25)	Aaron Fuller (25)	Caelan Tiongson (4)	Smart Araneta Coliseum	6–2
9	September 19	San Miguel	W 122–112	Andrei Caracut (20)	Fuller, Norwood (11)	Andrei Caracut (8)	Ninoy Aquino Stadium	7–2
10	September 23	Blackwater	L 118–139	Jhonard Clarito (18)	Aaron Fuller (9)	Andrei Caracut (5)	Ninoy Aquino Stadium	7–3

=== Playoffs ===
==== Bracket ====
Quarterfinals (Best-of-5)
A1	TNT	3
B4	NLEX	1
B1	Rain or Shine	3
A4	Magnolia	2
B2	San Miguel	3
A3	Converge	2
A2	Meralco	0
B3	Barangay Ginebra	3

Semifinals (Best-of-7)
A1	TNT	4
B1	Rain or Shine	1
B2	San Miguel	2
B3	Barangay Ginebra	4

Finals (Best-of-7)
A1	TNT	4
B3	Barangay Ginebra	2

==== Game log ====
2024 PBA Governors' Cup playoffs game log
Total: 4–6
Quarterfinals: 3–2

Game	Date	Opponent	Score	High points	High rebounds	High assists	Location Attendance	Series
1	September 25	Magnolia	W 109–105	Aaron Fuller (24)	Aaron Fuller (20)	Fuller, Santillan (4)	Ninoy Aquino Stadium	1–0
2	September 27	Magnolia	L 69–121	Adrian Nocum (13)	Caelan Tiongson (6)	Gian Mamuyac (3)	Santa Rosa Sports Complex	1–1
3	September 29	Magnolia	W 111–106 (OT)	Aaron Fuller (29)	Leonard Santillan (13)	Aaron Fuller (6)	Ynares Center	2–1
4	October 1	Magnolia	L 100–129	Aaron Fuller (22)	Aaron Fuller (10)	Belga, Caracut, Clarito, Mamuyac, Nocum, Norwood, Pangilinan-Lemetti (2)	Ninoy Aquino Stadium	2–2
5	October 5	Magnolia	W 113–103	Aaron Fuller (26)	Jhonard Clarito (10)	Felix Pangilinan-Lemetti (6)	Ynares Center	3–2

Semifinals: 1–4

Game	Date	Opponent	Score	High points	High rebounds	High assists	Location Attendance	Series
1	October 9	TNT	L 81–90	Aaron Fuller (18)	Aaron Fuller (21)	Caracut, Mamuyac (4)	PhilSports Arena	0–1
2	October 11	TNT	L 91–108	Jhonard Clarito (18)	Jhonard Clarito (7)	Caracut, Fuller (3)	Smart Araneta Coliseum	0–2
3	October 13	TNT	W 110–109	Aaron Fuller (26)	Aaron Fuller (16)	Gian Mamuyac (5)	Dasmariñas Arena	1–2
4	October 16	TNT	L 79–81	Aaron Fuller (22)	Aaron Fuller (18)	Mamuyac, Nocum, Pangilinan-Lemetti (4)	Smart Araneta Coliseum	1–3
5	October 18	TNT	L 95–113	Aaron Fuller (14)	Aaron Fuller (6)	Felix Pangilinan-Lemetti (4)	Ynares Center; 10,039	1–4

== Commissioner's Cup ==
=== Eliminations ===
==== Standings ====
Pos	Team	W	L	PCT	GB	Qualification
1	NorthPort Batang Pier	9	3	.750	—	Twice-to-beat in the quarterfinals
2	TNT Tropang Giga	8	4	.667 (Note: Head-to-head quotient: TNT 1.04, Converge 1.03, Barangay Ginebra 0.94)	1	Twice-to-beat in the quarterfinals
3	Converge FiberXers	8	4	.667	1	Best-of-three quarterfinals
4	Barangay Ginebra San Miguel	8	4	.667	1	Best-of-three quarterfinals
5	Meralco Bolts	7	5	.583 (Note: Head-to-head quotient: Meralco 1.08, Rain or Shine 1.04, Eastern 0.88)	2	Best-of-three quarterfinals
6	Rain or Shine Elasto Painters	7	5	.583	2	Best-of-three quarterfinals
7	Eastern (G)	7	5	.583	2	Twice-to-win in the quarterfinals
8	Magnolia Chicken Timplados Hotshots	6	6	.500 (Note: Eighth seed playoff: Magnolia 112–81 NLEX)	3	Twice-to-win in the quarterfinals
9	NLEX Road Warriors	6	6	.500	3	
10	San Miguel Beermen	5	7	.417	4	
11	Blackwater Bossing	3	9	.250 (Note: Head-to-head record: Blackwater 1–0 Phoenix)	6	
12	Phoenix Fuel Masters	3	9	.250	6	
13	Terrafirma Dyip	1	11	.083	8	

Source: PBA.ph
Rules for classification: 1) winning percentage; 2) if two teams are tied, head-to-head record; if three or more teams are tied, head-to-head goal average (quotient); if tied for 8th, one-game playoff; 3) overall quotient; 4) coin toss
(G) Guests

==== Game log ====
2024–25 PBA Commissioner's Cup game log
Total: 7–5
December: 4–1

Game	Date	Opponent	Score	High points	High rebounds	High assists	Location Attendance	Record
1	December 1, 2024	Meralco	L 111–121	Keith Datu (17)	Jhonard Clarito (11)	Andrei Caracut (8)	Ynares Center	0–1
2	December 4, 2024	Eastern	W 99–81	Deon Thompson (21)	Deon Thompson (15)	Felix Pangilinan-Lemetti (4)	Ninoy Aquino Stadium	1–1
3	December 10, 2024	San Miguel	W 107–93	Deon Thompson (18)	Jhonard Clarito (11)	Caracut, Nocum, Pangilinan-Lemetti (5)	Filoil EcoOil Centre	2–1
4	December 18, 2024	Magnolia	W 102–100	Deon Thompson (18)	Deon Thompson (15)	Felix Pangilinan-Lemetti (4)	Ninoy Aquino Stadium	3–1
5	December 22, 2024	Terrafirma	W 124–112	Deon Thompson (23)	Deon Thompson (17)	Pangilinan-Lemetti, Thompson (4)	PhilSports Arena	4–1

January: 3–4

Game	Date	Opponent	Score	High points	High rebounds	High assists	Location Attendance	Record
6	January 8, 2025	Blackwater	W 122–106	Deon Thompson (25)	Deon Thompson (16)	Anton Asistio (7)	PhilSports Arena	5–1
7	January 11, 2025	Phoenix	L 91–93	Deon Thompson (22)	Deon Thompson (13)	Deon Thompson (6)	Ninoy Aquino Stadium	5–2
8	January 14, 2025	Converge	L 96–103	Jhonard Clarito (24)	Deon Thompson (22)	Andrei Caracut (5)	Ninoy Aquino Stadium	5–3
9	January 16, 2025	NorthPort	W 127–107	Deon Thompson (27)	Deon Thompson (11)	Adrian Nocum (7)	PhilSports Arena	6–3
10	January 22, 2025	Barangay Ginebra	L 92–120	Deon Thompson (23)	Deon Thompson (15)	Caelan Tiongson (5)	Ynares Center	6–4
11	January 25, 2025	NLEX	L 110–122	Deon Thompson (26)	Deon Thompson (11)	Nocum, Thompson (5)	Ynares Center	6–5
12	January 31, 2025	TNT	W 106–96	Deon Thompson (22)	Deon Thompson (16)	Andrei Caracut (6)	PhilSports Arena	7–5

=== Playoffs ===
==== Bracket ====
Quarterfinals
(#1 twice-to-beat)
1	NorthPort	113
8	Magnolia	110
(Best-of-3)
4	Barangay Ginebra	2
5	Meralco	1
(#2 twice-to-beat)
2	TNT	109
7	Eastern	93
(Best-of-3)
3	Converge	1
6	Rain or Shine	2

Semifinals (Best-of-7)
1	NorthPort	1
4	Barangay Ginebra	4
2	TNT	4
6	Rain or Shine	1

Finals (Best-of-7)
4	Barangay Ginebra	3
2	TNT	4

==== Game log ====
2024–25 PBA Commissioner's Cup playoffs game log
Total: 3–5
Quarterfinals: 2–1

Game	Date	Opponent	Score	High points	High rebounds	High assists	Location Attendance	Series
1	February 5, 2025	Converge	L 118–130	Caelan Tiongson (23)	Deon Thompson (6)	Anton Asistio (5)	Smart Araneta Coliseum	0–1
2	February 7, 2025	Converge	W 114–104	Nocum, Thompson (28)	Deon Thompson (18)	Deon Thompson (7)	Ninoy Aquino Stadium	1–1
3	February 9, 2025	Converge	W 112–103	Deon Thompson (34)	Deon Thompson (12)	Deon Thompson (7)	Ynares Center	2–1

Semifinals: 1–4

Game	Date	Opponent	Score	High points	High rebounds	High assists	Location Attendance	Series
1	February 26, 2025	TNT	L 84–88	Deon Thompson (29)	Deon Thompson (16)	Andrei Caracut (4)	Smart Araneta Coliseum	0–1
2	February 28, 2025	TNT	L 91–93	Deon Thompson (22)	Deon Thompson (14)	Deon Thompson (5)	PhilSports Arena	0–2
3	March 2, 2025	TNT	W 103–98	Deon Thompson (19)	Deon Thompson (15)	Caracut, Clarito, Nocum, Thompson, Tiongson (4)	Smart Araneta Coliseum	1–2
4	March 5, 2025	TNT	L 85–93	Deon Thompson (44)	Deon Thompson (13)	Adrian Nocum (5)	Smart Araneta Coliseum	1–3
5	March 7, 2025	TNT	L 92–97	Deon Thompson (34)	Leonard Santillan (7)	Adrian Nocum (7)	Smart Araneta Coliseum	1–4

== Philippine Cup ==
=== Eliminations ===
==== Standings ====
Pos	Team	W	L	PCT	GB	Qualification
1	San Miguel Beermen	8	3	.727 (Note: Head-to-head quotient: San Miguel 1.06, NLEX 1.01, Magnolia 0.97, Barangay Ginebra 0.96)	—	Twice-to-beat in the quarterfinals
2	NLEX Road Warriors	8	3	.727	—	Twice-to-beat in the quarterfinals
3	Magnolia Chicken Timplados Hotshots	8	3	.727	—	Twice-to-beat in the quarterfinals
4	Barangay Ginebra San Miguel	8	3	.727	—	Twice-to-beat in the quarterfinals
5	Converge FiberXers	7	4	.636	1	Twice-to-win in the quarterfinals
6	TNT Tropang 5G	6	5	.545 (Note: Head-to-head quotient: TNT 1.13, Rain or Shine 1.02, Meralco 0.87)	2	Twice-to-win in the quarterfinals
7	Rain or Shine Elasto Painters	6	5	.545	2	Twice-to-win in the quarterfinals
8	Meralco Bolts	6	5	.545	2	Twice-to-win in the quarterfinals
9	Phoenix Fuel Masters	4	7	.364	4	
10	Blackwater Bossing	2	9	.182 (Note: Head-to-head record: Blackwater 1–0 NorthPort)	6	
11	NorthPort Batang Pier	2	9	.182	6	
12	Terrafirma Dyip	1	10	.091	7	

Source: PBA.ph
Rules for classification: 1) winning percentage; 2) if two teams are tied, head-to-head record; if three or more teams are tied, head-to-head goal average (quotient); if tied for 8th, one-game playoff; 3) overall quotient; 4) coin toss

==== Game log ====
2025 PBA Philippine Cup game log
Total: 6–5
April: 2–2

Game	Date	Opponent	Score	High points	High rebounds	High assists	Location Attendance	Record
1	April 12	NLEX	L 95–109	Caelan Tiongson (24)	Clarito, Nocum, Tiongson (7)	Adrian Nocum (6)	Ninoy Aquino Stadium	0–1
2	April 16	NorthPort	W 113–96	Gian Mamuyac (22)	Norwood, Santillan (10)	Andrei Caracut (5)	Smart Araneta Coliseum	1–1
3	April 27	Meralco	W 128–116	Leonard Santillan (27)	Leonard Santillan (7)	Andrei Caracut (7)	Ynares Center	2–1
4	April 30	Converge	L 97–107	Leonard Santillan (26)	Keith Datu (10)	Felix Pangilinan-Lemetti (5)	PhilSports Arena	2–2

May: 3–1

Game	Date	Opponent	Score	High points	High rebounds	High assists	Location Attendance	Record
5	May 7	Blackwater	W 120–106	Keith Datu (27)	Leonard Santillan (9)	Felix Pangilinan-Lemetti (5)	Ninoy Aquino Stadium	3–2
6	May 18	Magnolia	W 119–105	Adrian Nocum (20)	Leonard Santillan (13)	Adrian Nocum (7)	Ynares Center II; 8,175	4–2
7	May 21	TNT	L 103–111	Andrei Caracut (20)	Leonard Santillan (10)	Gian Mamuyac (7)	Ynares Center	4–3
8	May 28	Phoenix	W 109–99	Adrian Nocum (30)	Jhonard Clarito (10)	Mamuyac, Tiongson (4)	PhilSports Arena	5–3

June: 1–2

Game	Date	Opponent	Score	High points	High rebounds	High assists	Location Attendance	Record
9	June 4	Terrafirma	W 94–85	Jhonard Clarito (12)	Leonard Santillan (9)	Adrian Nocum (6)	PhilSports Arena	6–3
10	June 7	San Miguel	L 111–120	Andrei Caracut (24)	Clarito, Santillan (6)	Andrei Caracut (7)	Aquilino Q. Pimentel Jr. International Convention Center	6–4
11	June 15	Barangay Ginebra	L 80–98	Nocum, Santillan (13)	Leonard Santillan (10)	Andrei Caracut (3)	Ynares Center	6–5

=== Playoffs ===
==== Bracket ====
Quarterfinals (Top 4 twice-to-beat)
1	San Miguel	108
8	Meralco	97
4	Barangay Ginebra	88
5	Converge	80
2	NLEX	89	92
7	Rain or Shine	92	103
3	Magnolia	88	79
6	TNT	89	80

Semifinals (Best-of-7)
1	San Miguel	4
4	Barangay Ginebra	3
7	Rain or Shine	2
6	TNT	4

Finals (Best-of-7)
1	San Miguel	4
6	TNT	2

==== Game log ====
2025 PBA Philippine Cup playoffs game log
Total: 4–4
Quarterfinals: 2–0

Game	Date	Opponent	Score	High points	High rebounds	High assists	Location Attendance	Series
1	June 18	NLEX	W 92–89	Clarito, Nocum (20)	Jhonard Clarito (21)	Gabe Norwood (3)	PhilSports Arena	1–0
2	June 21	NLEX	W 103–92	Leonard Santillan (24)	Jhonard Clarito (16)	Adrian Nocum (6)	Ninoy Aquino Stadium	2–0

Semifinals: 2–4

Game	Date	Opponent	Score	High points	High rebounds	High assists	Location Attendance	Series
1	June 25	TNT	L 91–98	Andrei Caracut (16)	Caelan Tiongson (8)	Nocum, Tiongson (3)	SM Mall of Asia Arena	0–1
2	June 27	TNT	L 105–113 (OT)	Adrian Nocum (27)	Jhonard Clarito (8)	Gian Mamuyac (5)	Ninoy Aquino Stadium	0–2
3	June 29	TNT	W 107–86	Anton Asistio (24)	Keith Datu (10)	Anton Asistio (6)	Smart Araneta Coliseum	1–2
4	July 2	TNT	L 92–108	Gabe Norwood (18)	Gabe Norwood (9)	Andrei Caracut (7)	SM Mall of Asia Arena	1–3
5	July 4	TNT	W 113–97	Gian Mamuyac (22)	Clarito, Norwood (7)	Clarito, Nocum (5)	Smart Araneta Coliseum	2–3
6	July 6	TNT	L 89–97	Caelan Tiongson (30)	Leonard Santillan (8)	Caracut, Mamuyac, Nocum (3)	Smart Araneta Coliseum	2–4

== Transactions ==
=== Free agency ===
==== Signings ====
Player	Date signed	Contract amount	Contract length	Former team	Ref.
Beau Belga	September 11, 2024	Not disclosed	1 year	Re-signed	
Mike Malonzo	April 14, 2025	Not disclosed	3 years	Re-signed	
Kris Porter	May 28, 2025	Not disclosed	Not disclosed	Batangas City Tanduay Rum Masters (MPBL)	
Adrian Nocum	July 1, 2025	₱420,000 per month (max. contract)	3 years	Re-signed	

==== Subtractions ====
Player	Number	Position	Reason	New team	Ref.
Sherwin Concepcion	23	Small forward	End of contract	Abra Weavers (MPBL)	
Mac Belo	12	Power forward	Released	Zamboanga Valientes (The Asian Tournament)	
Nick Demusis	31	Small forward / Power forward	Contract not renewed	Nueva Ecija Rice Vanguards (MPBL)	

=== Trades ===
==== Pre-season ====
July
July 17, 2024	To Rain or Shine 2026 Blackwater second-round pick (from TNT)	To Blackwater Miguel Corteza

=== Recruited imports ===
Tournament	Name	Debuted	Last game	Record	Ref.
Governors' Cup	Aaron Fuller	August 20, 2024 (vs. Blackwater)	October 18, 2024 (vs. TNT)	11–9	
Commissioner's Cup	Deon Thompson	December 4, 2024 (vs. Eastern)	March 7, 2025 (vs. TNT)	10–9	

== Awards ==
Recipient	Award	Date awarded	Reference
Gian Mamuyac	2024–25 PBA Sportsmanship award	October 5, 2025	
Recipient	Honors	Date awarded	Reference
Caelan Tiongson	2024–25 PBA All-Rookie Team	October 13, 2025	
