= Anton Asistio =

Filipino basketball player

No. 8 – Rain or Shine Elasto Painters
- Position: Point guard
- League: PBA

Personal information
- Born: June 2, 1995 (age 31) Caloocan, Philippines
- Listed height: 5 ft 11 in (1.80 m)
- Listed weight: 175 lb (79 kg)

Career information
- High school: Ateneo (Quezon City)
- College: Ateneo
- PBA draft: 2020: 2nd round, 22nd overall pick
- Drafted by: Rain or Shine Elasto Painters
- Playing career: 2019–present

Career history
- 2019: Bataan Risers
- 2019–2020: Zamboanga Family's Brand Sardines
- 2021–present: Rain or Shine Elasto Painters

Career highlights
- 2× UAAP champion (2017, 2018)

Anton Rafael Asistio (born June 2, 1995) is a Filipino professional basketball player for the Rain or Shine Elasto Painters of the Philippine Basketball Association (PBA). He suited up for the Ateneo de Manila Blue Eagles, and won two UAAP championships. He has also played in the MPBL.

== Early life ==
Asistio was born into a family of pro and national team golfers. His father, Nio Asistio, was a former basketball player for Ateneo in high school who became a tennis player, and was a big influence on Anton choosing to pursue basketball instead of golf. They practiced together, shooting 300 to 500 jump shots a day. He also played in the Milo BEST Center's Small Basketeers of the Philippines tournament, leading Ateneo's junior team to the national title for 2007–08, at 13 years old. He played for Ateneo from grade school up to college.

== Collegiate career ==
Asistio then suited up for Ateneo de Manila Blue Eagles. In his first two seasons, Seasons 76 and 77, he seldom played, scoring a total of six points. In his rookie year, he was almost cut from the team, but was added onto the final roster to round it out. For Season 78, he was sent down to Team B. With the help of coach Yuri Escueta, he developed his skills further and regained his confidence. He also played in Division II of Father Martin Cup in 2015, leading Ateneo's Team B to the title with 45 points in the championship game.

Beginning in Season 79, Tab Baldwin became the coach of the Blue Eagles. Initially, he wasn't impressed by Asistio due to his weaknesses, such as his athleticism and ball-handling. After their run at the Filoil Flying V Cup, in which he experimented on playing point guard, the coaches then put the team on an intense eight-week weight training regime to get into shape. After seeing his work ethic, he added Asistio to the main roster as a shooting guard.

In his first game back in the UAAP, Asistio only had six points, but he had already matched his total output from his first two seasons. He then had four games where he scored in double-digits in the first round of eliminations, including a career-high 21 points in a win over the UE Red Warriors. He then had the opportunity to start games when Aaron Black went down with an injury.

In Season 80, Ateneo swept the first round of eliminations. From there, they went on to win the title. For Season 81, his senior year, Asistio was the captain of the team. During the elimination rounds, he shot 45.2% from three. They became back to back champions that season. In his final season, he averaged 7.3 points and shot 30% from three overall.

== Professional career ==
=== Bataan Risers (2019) ===
Asistio first played for the Bataan Risers in 2019 in the Chooks-to-Go Pilipinas 3x3 league. He then played for them in the MPBL.

=== Zamboanga Valientes (2019–2020) ===
On September 22, 2019, Asistio and Santi Santillan were traded to the Zamboanga Valientes for four players. He competed in the MPBL's Three-Point Shootout. His shooting helped Zamboanga advance to the semifinals with a win over the Batangas City Athletics. They were eliminated in the playoffs by the Davao Occidental Tigers.

=== Rain or Shine Elasto Painters (2021–present) ===
On December 7, 2020, Asistio declared for the PBA draft. He was selected by the Rain or Shine Elasto Painters in 2021 with the 22nd overall pick and signed to a one-year deal. In the PBA, he was converted into a point guard.

In his first conference, the 2021 Philippine Cup, Asistio and Rain or Shine's other rookies were given enough playing time to make a positive impact on the team. Although he only started two games that conference, he averaged 5.7 points, 1.6 rebounds, 1.8 assists in 18.4 minutes. With his play and Rain or Shine making the quarterfinals that conference, he was given a two-year contract extension.

Asistio got to play in the Rookies-Sophomores-Juniors game during the 2023 and 2024 All-Star weekends. He was given a two-year contract extension at the end of the 2023–24 season.

During the 2024–25 season, in a game against the NLEX Road Warriors, Asistio scored 25 points. In a win over the TNT Tropang Giga, he made a PBA career-best six triples for 21 points as Rain or Shine made the quarterfinals.

== PBA career statistics ==
Legend
GP	Games played	MPG	Minutes per game	FG%	Field-goal percentage
3FG%	3-point field-goal percentage	4P%	4-point field-goal percentage	FT%	Free-throw percentage
RPG	Rebounds per game	APG	Assists per game	SPG	Steals per game
BPG	Blocks per game	PPG	Points per game	127	Career high

As of the end of 2025–26 season

=== Season-by-season averages ===
Year	Team	GP	MPG	FG%	3P%	4P%	FT%	RPG	APG	SPG	BPG	PPG
2021	Rain or Shine	19	14.6	.350	.323	—	.929	1.4	1.2	.2	—	4.7
2022–23	Rain or Shine	34	18.9	.397	.367	—	.852	1.4	1.8	.3	—	7.8
2023–24	Rain or Shine	25	11.4	.333	.293	—	.722	1.0	1.3	.5	—	4.9
2024–25	Rain or Shine	53	13.6	.456	.428	.385	.800	1.4	1.6	.2	.0	6.7
2025–26	Rain or Shine	38	12.4	.359	.347	.263	.917	1.1	1.2	.2	—	5.2
Career		169	14.2	.394	.363	.333	.843	1.3	1.5	.3	.0	6.1

== Personal life ==
In 2021, Asistio became the first Filipino Anta brand ambassador. When he was younger, he co-hosted "Sports Kidz" on Studio 23 alongside Sara Castañeda, Javi Benitez and ice skater Katrice delos Reyes.
