= Caelan Tiongson =

Filipino-American basketball player

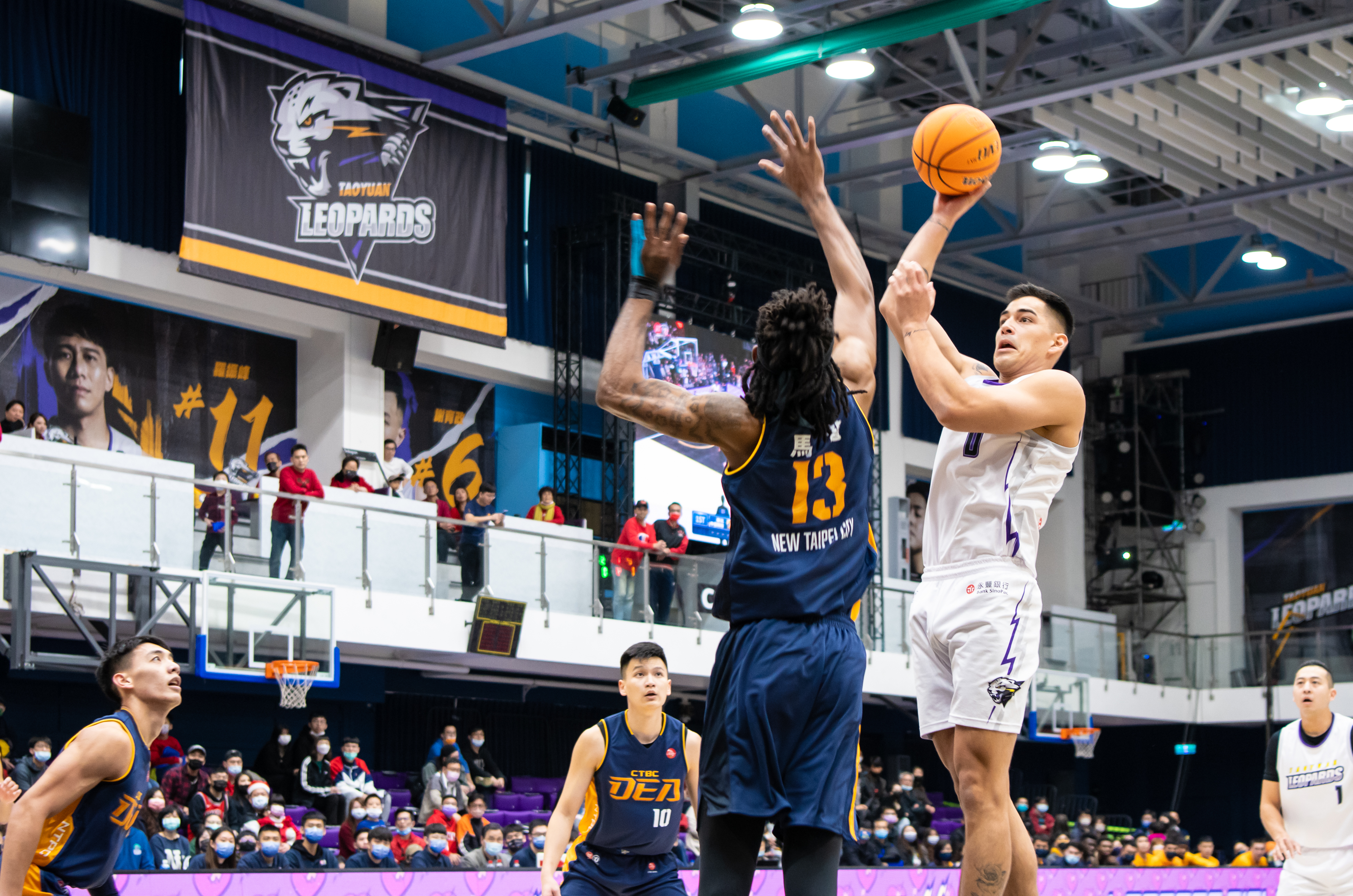

No. 0 – Rain or Shine Elasto Painters
- Position: Power forward / small forward
- League: PBA

Personal information
- Born: May 7, 1992 (age 34) Pomona, California, United States
- Listed height: 6 ft 4 in (1.93 m)
- Listed weight: 205 lb (93 kg)

Career information
- High school: Bonita (La Verne, California)
- College: La Verne; Biola
- PBA draft: 2024: 1st round, 7th overall pick
- Drafted by: Rain or Shine Elasto Painters
- Playing career: 2017–present

Career history
- 2017–2018: Nanhai/Chong Son Kung Fu
- 2018: Alab Pilipinas
- 2021–2022: Taoyuan Leopards
- 2024–present: Rain or Shine Elasto Painters

Career highlights
- PBA All-Star (2026); PBA All-Rookie Team (2025)

Caelan Todd Tiongson (born May 7, 1992) is a Filipino-American professional basketball player for the Rain or Shine Elasto Painters of the Philippine Basketball Association (PBA).

A native of Pomona, California, Tiongson played at Bonita High School in high school before playing for the University of La Verne Leopards in NCAA Division III to start his college career. His last college stint saw him play for Biola University's Eagles. In 2017, he made his pro debut with the ASEAN Basketball League team now known as the Macau Giant Pandas. In 2018, he moved to Alab Pilipinas before announcing his initial retirement from basketball in 2019.

He returned in 2021 to play for the T1 League's Taoyuan Leopards. In 2024, he was drafted seventh overall by the Rain or Shine Elasto Painters in the PBA season 49 draft. He made the PBA All-Rookie Team and was selected as an all-star in his sophomore season.

== Professional career ==
=== Nanhai/Chong Son Kung Fu (2017–2018) ===
Coming off a stint with the Biola Eagles of NCAA Division II, Tiongson began his pro career with the Nanhai Kung Fu (later renamed to Chong Son Kung Fu; known today as the Macau Black Knights) in the ASEAN Basketball League. He averaged 11.7 points, 8.2 rebounds, and 3.3 assists in his first season in the ABL.

=== Alab Pilipinas (2018) ===
On July 4, 2018, Tiongson moved to Alab Pilipinas, taking his talents to the Philippines for the first time. He averaged 6.9 points, 4.6 rebounds, and 2.3 assists with Alab.

=== Taoyuan Leopards (2021–2022) ===
After initially retiring from basketball in 2019, Tiongson would return to the court in 2021 with the Taoyuan Leopards of the newly established T1 League in Taiwan.

=== Rain or Shine Elasto Painters (2024–present) ===
On June 28, 2024, at the age of 32, Tiongson would finally declare for the PBA draft, signing up for season 49. He was selected by the Rain or Shine Elasto Painters with the seventh overall selection. He later signed a three-year deal with the team on July 28. After being selected to the PBA All-Rookie Team in 2025, Tiongson became an all-star for the 2026 PBA All-Star Weekend.

== PBA career statistics ==
Legend
GP	Games played	MPG	Minutes per game	FG%	Field-goal percentage
3FG%	3-point field-goal percentage	4P%	4-point field-goal percentage	FT%	Free-throw percentage
RPG	Rebounds per game	APG	Assists per game	SPG	Steals per game
BPG	Blocks per game	PPG	Points per game	127	Career high

As of the end of 2025–26 season

=== Season-by-season averages ===
Year	Team	GP	MPG	FG%	3P%	4P%	FT%	RPG	APG	SPG	BPG	PPG
2024–25	Rain or Shine	47	25.4	.433	.316	.125	.586	4.1	2.2	.3	.3	10.0
2025–26	Rain or Shine	37	27.1	.389	.364	.250	.673	4.7	2.6	.5	.2	11.4
Career		84	26.2	.412	.342	.208	.618	4.4	2.4	.4	.3	10.6

== Personal life ==
While in Biola University, Tiongson had a relationship with eventual The Bachelor season 23 winner Cassie Randolph. Their relationship was explored in the second season of the Young Once docuseries. His father hails from Cebu.
