= Felix Lemetti =

Filipino-Swedish basketball player

No. 2 – Rain or Shine Elasto Painters
- Position: Point guard
- League: PBA

Personal information
- Born: February 10, 1999 (age 27) Enskede-Årsta, Stockholm, Sweden
- Listed height: 6 ft 1 in (1.85 m)
- Listed weight: 190 lb (86 kg)

Career information
- College: Fairfield; Salt Lake CC; Omaha; Southern Utah
- PBA draft: 2024: 1st round, 8th overall pick
- Drafted by: Rain or Shine Elasto Painters
- Playing career: 2023–present

Career history
- 2023–2024: Fryshuset
- 2024–present: Rain or Shine Elasto Painters

Felix Alexander Pangilinan Lemetti (born February 10, 1999) is a Filipino-Swedish professional basketball player for the Rain or Shine Elasto Painters of the Philippine Basketball Association (PBA). He was born in the Stockholm borough of Enskede-Årsta.

Lemetti first began his college career for the Fairfield Stags before going on stints with Salt Lake CC, Omaha, and Southern Utah. After college, he made his professional debut for Fryshuset of Superettan, Sweden's second-tier basketball league. He then moved to the PBA in 2024 after he was selected eighth overall by Rain or Shine in the PBA season 49 draft.

He also represented Sweden in international competitions, playing for the men's under-18 and under-20 basketball teams.

== College career ==
Lemetti played for four different schools throughout his college career, having one-year stints in each. He first played for the Fairfield Stags in his freshman year, the SLCC Bruins in his sophomore year, the Omaha Mavericks in his junior year, and culminating with the Southern Utah Thunderbirds in his senior year.

== Professional career ==
=== Fryshuset (2023–2024) ===
Following his college career, Lemetti made his professional debut playing for Fryshuset, a team in the second-tier league of Swedish basketball, Superettan.

=== Rain or Shine Elasto Painters (2024–present) ===
On July 14, 2024, during the PBA season 49 draft, Lemetti was selected by the Rain or Shine Elasto Painters with the eighth pick. At the time of the draft, he was considered as a "surprise first round pick", with Felix himself admitting that he "wasn't sure if they're going to look for me for No. 8. I was looking at a couple of mock drafts and I didn't think they were going to pick me." He did a workout with Rain or Shine ahead of the draft, with its head coach Yeng Guiao stating that the team is taking a gamble on Lemetti, and that his credentials in college are part of the reason to pick him in the first round. Lemetti went on to sign a three-year deal with Rain or Shine on July 19. In January 2025, Lemetti suffered a left ankle injury after having an inflammation in his Achilles.

== PBA career statistics ==
Legend
GP	Games played	MPG	Minutes per game	FG%	Field-goal percentage
3FG%	3-point field-goal percentage	4P%	4-point field-goal percentage	FT%	Free-throw percentage
RPG	Rebounds per game	APG	Assists per game	SPG	Steals per game
BPG	Blocks per game	PPG	Points per game	127	Career high

As of the end of 2025–26 season

=== Season-by-season averages ===
Year	Team	GP	MPG	FG%	3P%	4P%	FT%	RPG	APG	SPG	BPG	PPG
2024–25	Rain or Shine	42	16.0	.372	.377	.100	.843	1.8	2.6	.2	.0	6.7
2025–26	Rain or Shine	26	18.5	.392	.284	.000	.685	2.2	2.8	.8	.2	8.5
Career		68	17.0	.381	.342	.091	.756	1.9	2.7	.4	.1	7.4

== Personal life ==
Lemetti was born and raised in the Swedish borough of Enskede-Årsta in Stockholm (now a part of Enskede-Årsta-Vantör) to a Swedish father and a Filipina mother. His mother comes from Mindoro.
