= 2023–24 Rain or Shine Elasto Painters season =

- Head coach: Yeng Guiao
- General Manager: Mamberto Mondragon; Jireh Ibañes (assistant)
- Owner(s): Asian Coatings Philippines, Inc.

Commissioner's Cup results
- Record: 6–5 (54.5%)
- Place: 7th
- Playoff finish: Quarterfinalist (lost to San Miguel with twice-to-win disadvantage)

Philippine Cup results
- Record: 6–5 (54.5%)
- Place: 5th
- Playoff finish: Semifinalist (lost to San Miguel, 0–4)

Rain or Shine Elasto Painters seasons

The 2023–24 Rain or Shine Elasto Painters season was the 17th season of the franchise in the Philippine Basketball Association (PBA).

== Key dates ==
- September 17: The PBA season 48 draft was held at the Market! Market! in Taguig.

== Draft picks ==
Round	Pick	Player	Position	Place of birth	College
1	3	Luis Villegas	C	USA	UE
1	4	Keith Datu	C	USA	Chico State
2	15	Henry Galinato	C/F	USA	UP Diliman
2	24	Adrian Nocum	G	Philippines	Mapúa
3	27	Sherwin Concepcion	F	Philippines	UST
4	38	JC Cullar	G	Italy	Benilde
5	49	Larry Arpia	G	Northern Mariana Islands	San Sebastian

== Roster ==
2023–24 Rain or Shine Elasto Painters roster
Players
Coaches

Pos.	#	POB	Name	Height	Weight	DOB (YYYY–MM–DD)	From
G	1	(Philippines)	Adrian Nocum (R)	6 ft 0 in (1.83 m)	167 lb (76 kg)	1999−08−10	Mapúa
G	3	(Philippines)	Gian Mamuyac	6 ft 2 in (1.88 m)	165 lb (75 kg)	1999–03–05	Ateneo
F	5	(United States)	Gabe Norwood (C)	6 ft 6 in (1.98 m)	190 lb (86 kg)	1985–02–09	George Mason
G	8	(Philippines)	Anton Asistio	5 ft 10 in (1.78 m)	175 lb (79 kg)	1995–06–02	Ateneo
G/F	10	(Philippines)	Shaun Ildefonso	6 ft 2 in (1.88 m)	198 lb (90 kg)	1997–09–30	National-U
F	12	(Philippines)	Mac Belo	6 ft 4 in (1.93 m)	185 lb (84 kg)	1993–02–12	Far Eastern
G	14	(Philippines)	Andrei Caracut	5 ft 10 in (1.78 m)	180 lb (82 kg)	1996–01–30	De La Salle
F	16	(Philippines)	Mark Borboran	6 ft 4 in (1.93 m)	185 lb (84 kg)	1984–11–01	UE
C	21	(United States)	Keith Datu (R)	6 ft 8 in (2.03 m)	220 lb (100 kg)	1996–03–19	Chico State
F	22	(Philippines)	Jhonard Clarito	6 ft 2 in (1.88 m)	187 lb (85 kg)	1996–04–03	De Ocampo
F	23	(Philippines)	Sherwin Concepcion (R)	6 ft 3 in (1.91 m)	202 lb (92 kg)	1997–01–23	UST
C	24	(United States)	Luis Villegas (R)	6 ft 7 in (2.01 m)	215 lb (98 kg)	1997−09−05	UE
F	25	(Philippines)	Leonard Santillan	6 ft 4 in (1.93 m)	210 lb (95 kg)	1996–03–05	De La Salle
F/C	26	(Philippines)	Philip Paredes	6 ft 5 in (1.96 m)	200 lb (91 kg)	1992–01–12	De La Salle
C	28	(Philippines)	Beau Belga	6 ft 5 in (1.96 m)	245 lb (111 kg)	1986–11–30	Philippine Christian
F	31	(Philippines)	Nick Demusis	6 ft 4 in (1.93 m)	205 lb (93 kg)	1991–05–09	Whittier

Head coach

- (Philippines) Yeng Guiao

Assistant coach(es)

- (Philippines) Caloy Garcia (1st assistant)
- (Philippines) Mike Buendia
- (United States) Gabe Norwood
- (Philippines) Ricky Umayam

Team manager

- (Philippines) Mamerto Mondragon^{[a]}
- (Philippines) Jireh Ibañes (assistant)

Legend

- (C) Team captain
- (CI) Commissioner's Cup Import
- (GI) Governors' Cup Import
- (EI) EASL Import
- (DP) Unsigned draft pick
- (FA) Free agent
- (IN) Inactive
- (S) Suspended
- (R) Rookie
- Injured

Roster

- ^{a} also serves as Rain or Shine's board governor.

== Preseason ==
=== PBA on Tour ===
==== Game log ====
2023 PBA on Tour game log
Total: 8–3
May: 1–0

Game	Date	Opponent	Score	High points	High rebounds	High assists	Location Attendance	Record
1	May 26	NLEX	W 117–93	Asistio, Nambatac (22)	Leonard Santillan (10)	Jhonard Clarito (4)	Ynares Sports Arena	1–0

June: 4–1

Game	Date	Opponent	Score	High points	High rebounds	High assists	Location Attendance	Record
2	June 2	Phoenix Super LPG	W 113–104	Caracut, Demusis (15)	Leonard Santillan (11)	Demusis, Mamuyac, Nambatac (4)	Ynares Center	2–0
3	June 7	San Miguel	W 100–98	Jhonard Clarito (17)	Leonard Santillan (10)	Beau Belga (8)	Ynares Sports Arena	3–0
4	June 11	Terrafirma	W 121–95	Rey Nambatac (21)	Nick Demusis (7)	Andrei Caracut (5)	Ynares Center	4–0
5	June 25	Barangay Ginebra	L 107–108	Demusis, Mamuyac (16)	Mark Borboran (10)	Rey Nambatac (7)	Ynares Sports Arena	4–1
6	June 30	Converge	W 127–110	Anton Asistio (20)	Nick Demusis (8)	Leonard Santillan (5)	Ynares Sports Arena	5–1

July: 3–2

Game	Date	Opponent	Score	High points	High rebounds	High assists	Location Attendance	Record
7	July 12	TNT	W 106–100	Gian Mamuyac (21)	Gian Mamuyac (10)	Caracut, Mamuyac (5)	Ynares Sports Arena	6–1
8	July 15	Magnolia	L 88–103	Jhonard Clarito (17)	Jhonard Clarito (9)	Jhonard Clarito (5)	Lamberto Macias Sports and Cultural Center	6–2
9	July 19	NorthPort	W 118–112	Leonard Santillan (20)	Beau Belga (8)	Beau Belga (7)	Ynares Sports Arena	7–2
10	July 23	Blackwater	W 131–108	Leonard Santillan (24)	Beau Belga (8)	Beau Belga (10)	Filoil EcoOil Centre	8–2
11	July 28	Meralco	L 95–103	Mac Belo (22)	Nick Demusis (10)	Jhonard Clarito (6)	Ynares Sports Arena	8–3

=== Converge Pocket Tournament ===
==== Game log ====
2023 PBA Converge Pocket Tournament game log
Total: 1–2
October: 1–2

Game	Date	Opponent	Score	High points	High rebounds	High assists	Location Attendance	Record
1	October 13	Phoenix Super LPG	W 109–105	DaJuan Summers (20)	Sherwin Concepcion (7)	Gabe Norwood (4)	Gatorade Hoops Center	1–0
2	October 15	Converge	L 111–120	DaJuan Summers (21)	Andrei Caracut (5)	Andrei Caracut (6)	Gatorade Hoops Center	1–1
3	October 17	Blackwater	L 87–102	Clarito, Santillan (17)	Belga, Clarito, Ildefonso (7)	Caracut, Mamuyac (4)	Gatorade Hoops Center	1–2

=== MassKara Festival exhibition ===
==== Game log ====
2023 PBA MassKara Festival exhibition game log
Total: 1–0
October: 1–0

Game	Date	Opponent	Score	High points	High rebounds	High assists	Location Attendance	Record
1	October 19	Meralco	W 94–81	Leonard Santillan (16)	Leonard Santillan (12)	Anton Asistio (4)	La Salle Coliseum	1–0

== Commissioner's Cup ==
=== Eliminations ===
==== Standings ====
Pos	Team	W	L	PCT	GB	Qualification
1	Magnolia Chicken Timplados Hotshots	9	2	.818	—	Twice-to-beat in quarterfinals
2	San Miguel Beermen	8	3	.727 (Note: Head-to-head quotient: San Miguel 1.17, Barangay Ginebra 0.99, Phoenix Super LPG 0.98, Meralco 0.89)	1	Twice-to-beat in quarterfinals
3	Barangay Ginebra San Miguel	8	3	.727	1	Twice-to-beat in quarterfinals
4	Phoenix Super LPG Fuel Masters	8	3	.727	1	Twice-to-beat in quarterfinals
5	Meralco Bolts	8	3	.727	1	Twice-to-win in quarterfinals
6	NorthPort Batang Pier	6	5	.545 (Note: Head-to-head record: NorthPort 1–0 Rain or Shine)	3	Twice-to-win in quarterfinals
7	Rain or Shine Elasto Painters	6	5	.545	3	Twice-to-win in quarterfinals
8	TNT Tropang Giga	5	6	.455	4	Twice-to-win in quarterfinals
9	NLEX Road Warriors	4	7	.364	5	
10	Terrafirma Dyip	2	9	.182	7	
11	Blackwater Bossing	1	10	.091 (Note: Head-to-head record: Blackwater 1–0 Converge)	8	
12	Converge FiberXers	1	10	.091	8	

Source: PBA.ph
Rules for classification: 1) winning percentage; 2) if two teams are tied, head-to-head record; if three or more teams are tied, head-to-head goal average (quotient); if tied for 8th, one-game playoff; 3) overall quotient; 4) coin toss

==== Game log ====
2023–24 PBA Commissioner's Cup game log
Total: 6–5
November: 0–5

Game	Date	Opponent	Score	High points	High rebounds	High assists	Location Attendance	Record
1	November 8	Meralco	L 102–107	DaJuan Summers (27)	DaJuan Summers (9)	Andrei Caracut (6)	PhilSports Arena	0–1
2	November 12	NorthPort	L 103–113	DaJuan Summers (32)	DaJuan Summers (9)	Andrei Caracut (5)	Ynares Center	0–2
3	November 18	Phoenix Super LPG	L 98–99	Leonard Santillan (19)	DaJuan Summers (7)	Andrei Caracut (5)	Ynares Center	0–3
4	November 24	Barangay Ginebra	L 102–107	Andrei Caracut (32)	DaJuan Summers (12)	Andrei Caracut (5)	Smart Araneta Coliseum	0–4
5	November 29	San Miguel	L 110–115	Gian Mamuyac (33)	Demetrius Treadwell (15)	Andrei Caracut (6)	Smart Araneta Coliseum	0–5

December: 4–0

Game	Date	Opponent	Score	High points	High rebounds	High assists	Location Attendance	Record
6	December 2	Blackwater	W 115–110	Andrei Caracut (17)	Demetrius Treadwell (18)	Demetrius Treadwell (7)	PhilSports Arena	1–5
7	December 8	NLEX	W 113–101	Demetrius Treadwell (23)	Demetrius Treadwell (18)	Andrei Caracut (6)	PhilSports Arena	2–5
8	December 16	Magnolia	W 113–110	Demetrius Treadwell (30)	Demetrius Treadwell (16)	Demetrius Treadwell (9)	Aquilino Q. Pimentel Jr. International Convention Center	3–5
9	December 23	Terrafirma	W 116–105	Beau Belga (18)	Demetrius Treadwell (19)	Caracut, Nocum, Treadwell (4)	Smart Araneta Coliseum	4–5

January: 2–0

Game	Date	Opponent	Score	High points	High rebounds	High assists	Location Attendance	Record
10	January 5	TNT	W 119–112	Demetrius Treadwell (25)	Demetrius Treadwell (24)	Caracut, Nambatac, Treadwell (4)	Smart Araneta Coliseum	5–5
11	January 14	Converge	W 112–111	Demetrius Treadwell (21)	Demetrius Treadwell (17)	Demetrius Treadwell (8)	PhilSports Arena	6–5

=== Playoffs ===
==== Bracket ====
Quarterfinals (Top 4 twice-to-beat)
1	Magnolia	109
8	TNT	94
4	Phoenix Super LPG	107	88
5	Meralco	116***	84
2	San Miguel	127
7	Rain or Shine	122
3	Barangay Ginebra	106
6	NorthPort	93

Semifinals (Best-of-5)
1	Magnolia	3
4	Phoenix Super LPG	1
2	San Miguel	3
3	Barangay Ginebra	0

Finals (Best-of-7)
1	Magnolia	2
2	San Miguel	4

***Game went into triple overtime

==== Game log ====
2023–24 PBA Commissioner's Cup playoffs game log
Total: 0–1
Quarterfinals: 0–1

Game	Date	Opponent	Score	High points	High rebounds	High assists	Location Attendance	Series
1	January 19	San Miguel	L 122–127	Demetrius Treadwell (22)	Demetrius Treadwell (10)	Demetrius Treadwell (8)	PhilSports Arena	0–1

== Philippine Cup ==
=== Eliminations ===
==== Standings ====
Pos	Team	W	L	PCT	GB	Qualification
1	San Miguel Beermen	10	1	.909	—	Twice-to-beat in the quarterfinals
2	Barangay Ginebra San Miguel	7	4	.636	3	Twice-to-beat in the quarterfinals
3	Meralco Bolts	6	5	.545 (Note: Head-to-head quotient: Meralco 1.06, TNT 1.03, Rain or Shine 1.01, NLEX 0.99, Magnolia 0.90)	4	Best-of-three quarterfinals
4	TNT Tropang Giga	6	5	.545	4	Best-of-three quarterfinals
5	Rain or Shine Elasto Painters	6	5	.545	4	Best-of-three quarterfinals
6	NLEX Road Warriors	6	5	.545	4	Best-of-three quarterfinals
7	Magnolia Chicken Timplados Hotshots	6	5	.545	4	Twice-to-win in the quarterfinals
8	Terrafirma Dyip	5	6	.455 (Note: Eighth seed playoff: Terrafirma 104–96 NorthPort)	5	Twice-to-win in the quarterfinals
9	NorthPort Batang Pier	5	6	.455	5	
10	Blackwater Bossing	4	7	.364	6	
11	Phoenix Fuel Masters	3	8	.273	7	
12	Converge FiberXers	2	9	.182	8	

Source: PBA.ph
Rules for classification: 1) winning percentage; 2) if two teams are tied, head-to-head record; if three or more teams are tied, head-to-head goal average (quotient); if tied for 8th, one-game playoff; 3) overall quotient; 4) coin toss

==== Game log ====
2024 PBA Philippine Cup game log
Total: 6–5
February: 0–1

Game	Date	Opponent	Score	High points	High rebounds	High assists	Location Attendance	Record
1	February 28	TNT	L 107–108	Nocum, Santillan (20)	Leonard Santillan (11)	Beau Belga (6)	Ynares Center	0–1

March: 1–3

Game	Date	Opponent	Score	High points	High rebounds	High assists	Location Attendance	Record
2	March 2	Meralco	L 117–121 (OT)	Adrian Nocum (29)	Beau Belga (9)	Caracut, Norwood, Santillan (4)	Smart Araneta Coliseum	0–2
3	March 8	Barangay Ginebra	L 107–113	Anton Asistio (21)	Beau Belga (11)	Adrian Nocum (6)	Smart Araneta Coliseum	0–3
4	March 15	San Miguel	L 97–109	Leonard Santillan (31)	Leonard Santillan (14)	Gian Mamuyac (7)	Smart Araneta Coliseum	0–4
5	March 17	Phoenix	W 100–85	Adrian Nocum (28)	Beau Belga (11)	Caracut, Nocum (6)	Ynares Center	1–4
All-Star Break

April: 4–1

Game	Date	Opponent	Score	High points	High rebounds	High assists	Location Attendance	Record
6	April 3	Converge	W 110–90	Beau Belga (25)	Beau Belga (12)	Andrei Caracut (13)	Smart Araneta Coliseum	2–4
7	April 6	Blackwater	W 110–103	Leonard Santillan (28)	Belga, Santillan (7)	Gian Mamuyac (8)	Ninoy Aquino Stadium	3–4
8	April 13	Terrafirma	W 116–104	Beau Belga (19)	Leonard Santillan (9)	Andrei Caracut (10)	Caloocan Sports Complex	4–4
9	April 17	NorthPort	W 115–105	Beau Belga (28)	Beau Belga (13)	Beau Belga (7)	Ninoy Aquino Stadium	5–4
10	April 20	Magnolia	L 102–108	Adrian Nocum (19)	Beau Belga (8)	Beau Belga (6)	Tiaong Convention Center	5–5

May: 1–0

Game	Date	Opponent	Score	High points	High rebounds	High assists	Location Attendance	Record
11	May 3	NLEX	W 120–104	Beau Belga (18)	Leonard Santillan (9)	Andrei Caracut (6)	PhilSports Arena	6–5

=== Playoffs ===
==== Bracket ====
Quarterfinals
(#1 twice-to-beat)
1	San Miguel	95	110
8	Terrafirma	106	91
(Best-of-3)
4	TNT	1
5	Rain or Shine	2
(#2 twice-to-beat)
2	Barangay Ginebra	99
7	Magnolia	77
(Best-of-3)
3	Meralco	2
6	NLEX	0

Semifinals (Best-of-7)
1	San Miguel	4
5	Rain or Shine	0
2	Barangay Ginebra	3
3	Meralco	4

Finals (Best-of-7)
1	San Miguel	2
3	Meralco	4

==== Game log ====
2024 PBA Philippine Cup playoffs game log
Total: 2–5
Quarterfinals: 2–1

Game	Date	Opponent	Score	High points	High rebounds	High assists	Location Attendance	Series
1	May 8	TNT	L 99–116	Leonard Santillan (23)	Mark Borboran (5)	Andrei Caracut (4)	Smart Araneta Coliseum	0–1
2	May 10	TNT	W 121–113	Jhonard Clarito (29)	Jhonard Clarito (7)	Beau Belga (5)	Rizal Memorial Coliseum	1–1
3	May 13	TNT	W 110–109	Gian Mamuyac (25)	Jhonard Clarito (9)	Asistio, Belga, Caracut, Nocum, Santillan (3)	Ninoy Aquino Stadium	2–1

Semifinals: 0–4

Game	Date	Opponent	Score	High points	High rebounds	High assists	Location Attendance	Series
1	May 17	San Miguel	L 98–101	Gian Mamuyac (20)	Leonard Santillan (8)	Jhonard Clarito (4)	Mall of Asia Arena	0–1
2	May 19	San Miguel	L 89–106	Anton Asistio (20)	Adrian Nocum (9)	Adrian Nocum (4)	Mall of Asia Arena	0–2
3	May 22	San Miguel	L 107–117	Beau Belga (19)	Leonard Santillan (11)	Andrei Caracut (6)	Dasmariñas Arena	0–3
4	May 24	San Miguel	L 100–107	Gian Mamuyac (30)	Belga, Demusis (8)	Belga, Norwood (7)	Mall of Asia Arena	0–4

== Transactions ==
=== Free agency ===
==== Signings ====
Player	Date signed	Contract amount	Contract length	Former team
Nick Demusis	April 28, 2023	Not disclosed	2 years	Re-signed
Mark Borboran	April 28, 2023	Not disclosed	2 years	Re-signed
Mac Belo	May 31, 2023	₱300,000 per month	1 year	Re-signed
Rey Nambatac	June 27, 2023	₱420,000 per month (max. contract)	2 years	Re-signed
Andrei Caracut	August 29, 2023	Not disclosed	2 years	Re-signed
James Yap	September 26, 2023	Not disclosed	1 conference	Re-signed
Beau Belga	December 14, 2023	Not disclosed	1 year	Re-signed
Leonard Santillan	January 24, 2024	Not disclosed	3 years	Re-signed
Anton Asistio	January 24, 2024	Not disclosed	2 years	Re-signed
Philip Paredes	March 21, 2024	Not disclosed	1 conference	NLEX Road Warriors
Shaun Ildefonso	April 29, 2024	Not disclosed	2 years	Re-signed
Jhonard Clarito	April 29, 2024	Not disclosed	2 years	Re-signed
Gabe Norwood	May 30, 2024	Not disclosed	1 year	Re-signed

==== Subtractions ====
Player	Number	Position	Reason	New team
Dave Marcelo		Center	Waived	NLEX Road Warriors
James Yap	18	Small forward / Shooting guard	Request for release	Blackwater Bossing

=== Trades ===
==== Pre-season ====
May
May 8, 2023	To Rain or Shine 2024 Converge second-round pick 2025 Converge second-round pick	To Converge Mike Nieto
May 18, 2023	To Rain or Shine Mac Belo	To Meralco Norbert Torres
September
September 21, 2023	To Rain or Shine Dave Marcelo 2024 TNT first-round pick	To TNT Henry Galinato Jewel Ponferada

==== Philippine Cup ====
February
February 14, 2024	To Rain or Shine 2023 TNT first-round pick 2024 TNT second-round pick	To Blackwater Rey Nambatac

=== Recruited imports ===
Tournament	Name	Debuted	Last game	Record
Commissioner's Cup	DaJuan Summers	November 8, 2023 (vs. Meralco)	November 24, 2023 (vs. Barangay Ginebra)	0–4
Commissioner's Cup	Demetrius Treadwell	November 29, 2023 (vs. San Miguel)	January 19, 2024 (vs. San Miguel)	6–2

== Awards ==
Recipient	Award	Date awarded
Jhonard Clarito	2023–24 PBA Most Improved Player	August 18, 2024
