= Jhonard Clarito =

Filipino basketball player

No. 22 – Rain or Shine Elasto Painters
- Position: Small forward
- League: PBA

Personal information
- Born: April 3, 1996 (age 30)
- Listed height: 6 ft 2 in (1.88 m)
- Listed weight: 187 lb (85 kg)

Career information
- College: De Ocampo
- PBA draft: 2022: 2nd round, 17th overall pick
- Drafted by: Rain or Shine Elasto Painters
- Playing career: 2018–present

Career history
- 2018–2021: San Juan Knights
- 2021: JPS Zamboanga City
- 2021–2022: San Juan Knights
- 2022–present: Rain or Shine Elasto Painters

Career highlights
- PBA Most Improved Player (2024); MPBL champion (2019)

Jhonard Clarito (born April 3, 1996) is a Filipino professional basketball player for the Rain or Shine Elasto Painters of the Philippine Basketball Association (PBA).

== Amateur career ==
=== San Juan Knights (2018–2021) ===
Coming off a college career with De Ocampo Memorial College, Clarito joined the expansion San Juan Knights of the Maharlika Pilipinas Basketball League (MPBL). Averaging 4.2 points and 4.1 rebounds in the 2018–19 MPBL season, he played an important role in the winner-take-all game 5 of the 2019 MPBL finals. In the last minute of the fourth quarter, Clarito made two crucial shots that gave San Juan the lead and eventually clinched them their first MPBL championship. Coincidentally, San Juan's Finals opponent was Clarito's hometown team, the Davao Occidental Tigers, with the game being held at Davao City.

Clarito stayed with San Juan for the 2019–20 MPBL season, improving to averaging a near double-double with 11.7 points and 8.8 rebounds alongside 2 assists, helping the team clinch back-to-back national finals appearances. He also was part of San Juan's finals run in the 2021 FilBasket Subic Championship.

== Professional career ==
=== JPS Zamboanga City (2021) ===
Clarito would get his first professional stint after signing with JPS Zamboanga City of the Pilipinas VisMin Super Cup.

=== Return to San Juan (2021–2022) ===
After his VisMin stint, Clarito made his return to San Juan for the 2021 MPBL Invitational and 2022 FilBasket Summer Championship.

=== Rain or Shine Elasto Painters (2022–present) ===
In the PBA season 47 draft, Clarito was selected by the Rain or Shine Elasto Painters with the 17th overall pick. After his first season where he only averaged 1.3 points per game on 23.1% shooting, Clarito broke out in the following 2023–24 PBA season with a bigger role, averaging 10.8 points per game on 46.6% shooting with 4.3 rebounds to add. He signed a new two-year deal with Rain or Shine and later won PBA's Most Improved Player for the season.

== Career statistics ==
=== PBA ===
Legend
GP	Games played	MPG	Minutes per game	FG%	Field-goal percentage
3FG%	3-point field-goal percentage	4P%	4-point field-goal percentage	FT%	Free-throw percentage
RPG	Rebounds per game	APG	Assists per game	SPG	Steals per game
BPG	Blocks per game	PPG	Points per game	**127**	Career high

As of the end of 205–26 season

==== Season-by-season averages ====
Year	Team	GP	MPG	FG%	3P%	4P%	FT%	RPG	APG	SPG	BPG	PPG
2022–23	Rain or Shine	19	5.8	.231	.150	—	.750	.8	.3	.3	—	1.3
2023–24	Rain or Shine	30	21.6	.466	.330	—	.745	4.3	1.7	.7	.3	10.8
2024–25	Rain or Shine	**59**	25.7	**.487**	.331	—	.727	5.5	1.8	1.0	**.4**	**11.2**
2025–26	Rain or Shine	46	**26.6**	.464	**.354**	.000	**.782**	**6.4**	**2.2**	**1.2**	.2	10.9
Career		154	22.7	.466	.327	.000	.751	4.9	1.7	.9	.3	9.8

=== MPBL ===
Legend
GP	Games played	GS	Games started	MPG	Minutes per game
FG%	Field-goal percentage	3P%	3-point field-goal percentage	FT%	Free-throw percentage
RPG	Rebounds per game	APG	Assists per game	SPG	Steals per game
BPG	Blocks per game	PPG	Points per game	**Bold**	Career high

==== Season-by-season averages ====
Year	Team	GP	GS	MPG	FG%	3P%	FT%	RPG	APG	SPG	BPG	PPG
2018–19	San Juan	32	**5**	13.3	.397	.222	.534	4.1	.9	1.0	.5	4.2
2019–20	San Juan	**40**	3	**23.0**	**.427**	**.286**	**.712**	**8.8**	**2.0**	**1.8**	**1.0**	**11.7**
