= 2023–24 San Miguel Beermen season =

- Head coach: Jorge Gallent
- General Manager: Gee Abanilla; Daniel Henares (assistant)
- Owner(s): San Miguel Brewery, Inc. (a San Miguel Corporation subsidiary)

Commissioner's Cup results
- Record: 8–3 (72.7%)
- Place: 2nd
- Playoff finish: Champions (Defeated Magnolia, 4–2)

Philippine Cup results
- Record: 10–1 (90.9%)
- Place: 1st
- Playoff finish: Runner-up (lost to Meralco, 2–4)

San Miguel Beermen seasons

The 2023–24 San Miguel Beermen season was the 48th season of the franchise in the Philippine Basketball Association (PBA).

== Key dates ==
- September 17: The PBA season 48 draft was held at the Market! Market! in Taguig.

== Draft picks ==
| Round | Pick | Player | Position | Place of birth | College |
|---|---|---|---|---|---|
| 3 | 35 | Troy Mallillin | F | Philippines | Ateneo |
| 4 | 46 | Jayson Apolonio | F | Philippines | Letran |
| 5 | 57 | Ichie Altamirano | G | Philippines | San Sebastian |
| 6 | 64 | John Gob | C/F | Philippines | UP Diliman |
| 7 | 69 | Jayvee dela Cruz | G | Philippines | UC |
| 8 | 73 | Jamel Ramos | G | USA | Reed HS |
| 9 | 76 | Kyt Jimenez | G | Saudi Arabia | Perpetual |

== Roster ==
2023–24 San Miguel Beermen roster
Players
Coaches

| Pos. | # | POB | Name | Height | Weight | DOB (YYYY–MM–DD) | From |
|---|---|---|---|---|---|---|---|
| G | 0 | (United States) | Simon Enciso | 5 ft 11 in (1.80 m) | 185 lb (84 kg) | 1991–02–12 | Notre Dame de Namur |
| F | 2 | (Philippines) | Don Trollano | 6 ft 3 in (1.91 m) | 182 lb (83 kg) | 1992–01–07 | Adamson |
| F/C | 3 | (United States) | Moala Tautuaa | 6 ft 8 in (2.03 m) | 245 lb (111 kg) | 1989–04–30 | Chadron State |
| F | 4 | (Philippines) | Troy Mallillin (R) | 6 ft 4 in (1.93 m) | 190 lb (86 kg) | 1999–01–04 | Ateneo |
| G | 6 | (United States) | Chris Ross (C) | 6 ft 1 in (1.85 m) | 180 lb (82 kg) | 1985–03–09 | Marshall |
| G | 7 | (Philippines) | Terrence Romeo | 5 ft 11 in (1.80 m) | 178 lb (81 kg) | 1992–03–16 | Far Eastern |
| G/F | 13 | (United States) | Marcio Lassiter | 6 ft 2 in (1.88 m) | 185 lb (84 kg) | 1987–05–16 | Cal State Fullerton |
| C | 15 | (Philippines) | June Mar Fajardo | 6 ft 10 in (2.08 m) | 268 lb (122 kg) | 1989–11–17 | Cebu |
| G/F | 21 | (Philippines) | Jeron Teng | 6 ft 2 in (1.88 m) | 185 lb (84 kg) | 1994–03–21 | De La Salle |
| G | 39 | (Philippines) | Jericho Cruz | 6 ft 1 in (1.85 m) | 190 lb (86 kg) | 1990–10–11 | Adamson |
| G | 76 | (Saudi Arabia) | Kyt Jimenez (R) | 5 ft 11 in (1.80 m) | 165 lb (75 kg) | 1997–03–21 | UPHSD |
| G/F | 77 | (Hong Kong) | CJ Perez | 6 ft 2 in (1.88 m) | 185 lb (84 kg) | 1993–11–17 | Lyceum |
| F | 87 | (Philippines) | Vic Manuel | 6 ft 4 in (1.93 m) | 201 lb (91 kg) | 1987–06–18 | PSBA |
| F | 91 | (Philippines) | Rodney Brondial | 6 ft 5 in (1.96 m) | 210 lb (95 kg) | 1990–11–20 | Adamson |

Head coach

- (Philippines) Jorge Gallent

Assistant coach(es)

- (Philippines) Peter Martin (1st assistant)
- (Philippines) Ato Agustin
- (Philippines) Dayong Mendoza
- (Philippines) Biboy Ravanes
- (United States) Chris Ross
- (Philippines) Boyzie Zamar
- (Philippines) Leo Austria (consultant)

Team manager

- (Philippines) Gee Abanilla
- (Philippines) Daniel Henares (assistant)

Legend

- (C) Team captain
- (CI) Commissioner's Cup Import
- (GI) Governors' Cup Import
- (EI) EASL Import
- (DP) Unsigned draft pick
- (FA) Free agent
- (IN) Inactive
- (S) Suspended
- (R) Rookie
- Injured

Roster

== Preseason ==
=== PBA on Tour ===
==== Game log ====
2023 PBA on Tour game log
Total: 3–8
May: 1–1

| Game | Date | Opponent | Score | High points | High rebounds | High assists | Location Attendance | Record |
|---|---|---|---|---|---|---|---|---|
| 1 | May 24 | Phoenix Super LPG | L 101–106 | Terrence Romeo (27) | Robbie Herndon (11) | Terrence Romeo (7) | Ynares Sports Arena | 0–1 |
| 2 | May 27 | NorthPort | W 87–75 | Jericho Cruz (22) | Rodney Brondial (21) | Jericho Cruz (4) | Caloocan Sports Complex | 1–1 |

June: 1–4

| Game | Date | Opponent | Score | High points | High rebounds | High assists | Location Attendance | Record |
|---|---|---|---|---|---|---|---|---|
| 3 | June 4 | Barangay Ginebra | W 90–78 | Terrence Romeo (21) | Rodney Brondial (16) | CJ Perez (4) | Ynares Center | 2–1 |
| 4 | June 7 | Rain or Shine | L 98–100 | Allyn Bulanadi (31) | Rodney Brondial (18) | Allyn Bulanadi (5) | Ynares Sports Arena | 2–2 |
| 5 | June 10 | Meralco | L 89–92 | Jericho Cruz (19) | Rodney Brondial (9) | Moala Tautuaa (7) | Tiaong Convention Center | 2–3 |
| 6 | June 18 | Converge | L 111–113 (OT) | Jericho Cruz (41) | Brondial, Tautuaa (14) | Moala Tautuaa (5) | Ynares Sports Arena | 2–4 |
| 7 | June 28 | NLEX | L 94–102 | Allyn Bulanadi (26) | Rodney Brondial (24) | Jayvee dela Cruz (5) | Ynares Sports Arena | 2–5 |

July: 1–3

| Game | Date | Opponent | Score | High points | High rebounds | High assists | Location Attendance | Record |
|---|---|---|---|---|---|---|---|---|
| 8 | July 2 | Blackwater | L 101–103 | Allyn Bulanadi (26) | Rodney Brondial (12) | Apacible, Baclao, Cruz, Lee (4) | Filoil EcoOil Centre | 2–6 |
| 9 | July 7 | TNT | W 111–74 | Marvin Lee (22) | Rodney Brondial (13) | Allyn Bulanadi (4) | Ynares Sports Arena | 3–6 |
| 10 | July 9 | Magnolia | L 65–94 | Jericho Cruz (15) | Rodney Brondial (11) | Nonoy Baclao (5) | Ynares Sports Arena | 3–7 |
| 11 | July 16 | Terrafirma | L 72–85 | Brondial, Cruz (19) | Rodney Brondial (17) | Paolo Javelona (4) | Filoil EcoOil Centre | 3–8 |

== Commissioner's Cup ==
=== Eliminations ===
==== Standings ====
| Pos | Team | W | L | PCT | GB | Qualification |
|---|---|---|---|---|---|---|
| 1 | Magnolia Chicken Timplados Hotshots | 9 | 2 | .818 | — | Twice-to-beat in quarterfinals |
| 2 | San Miguel Beermen | 8 | 3 | .727 (Note: Head-to-head quotient: San Miguel 1.17, Barangay Ginebra 0.99, Phoenix Super LPG 0.98, Meralco 0.89) | 1 | Twice-to-beat in quarterfinals |
| 3 | Barangay Ginebra San Miguel | 8 | 3 | .727 | 1 | Twice-to-beat in quarterfinals |
| 4 | Phoenix Super LPG Fuel Masters | 8 | 3 | .727 | 1 | Twice-to-beat in quarterfinals |
| 5 | Meralco Bolts | 8 | 3 | .727 | 1 | Twice-to-win in quarterfinals |
| 6 | NorthPort Batang Pier | 6 | 5 | .545 (Note: Head-to-head record: NorthPort 1–0 Rain or Shine) | 3 | Twice-to-win in quarterfinals |
| 7 | Rain or Shine Elasto Painters | 6 | 5 | .545 | 3 | Twice-to-win in quarterfinals |
| 8 | TNT Tropang Giga | 5 | 6 | .455 | 4 | Twice-to-win in quarterfinals |
| 9 | NLEX Road Warriors | 4 | 7 | .364 | 5 | |
| 10 | Terrafirma Dyip | 2 | 9 | .182 | 7 | |
| 11 | Blackwater Bossing | 1 | 10 | .091 (Note: Head-to-head record: Blackwater 1–0 Converge) | 8 | |
| 12 | Converge FiberXers | 1 | 10 | .091 | 8 | |

Source: PBA.ph
Rules for classification: 1) winning percentage; 2) if two teams are tied, head-to-head record; if three or more teams are tied, head-to-head goal average (quotient); if tied for 8th, one-game playoff; 3) overall quotient; 4) coin toss

==== Game log ====
2023–24 PBA Commissioner's Cup game log
Total: 8–3
November: 3–1

| Game | Date | Opponent | Score | High points | High rebounds | High assists | Location Attendance | Record |
|---|---|---|---|---|---|---|---|---|
| 1 | November 15 | NLEX | L 113–117 (OT) | Terrence Romeo (28) | June Mar Fajardo (16) | Terrence Romeo (6) | Ynares Center | 0–1 |
| 2 | November 19 | Meralco | W 93–83 | Ivan Aska (27) | June Mar Fajardo (15) | Chris Ross (6) | Smart Araneta Coliseum | 1–1 |
| 3 | November 25 | Converge | W 105–96 | Ivan Aska (27) | Aska, Perez (11) | CJ Perez (5) | Tiaong Convention Center | 2–1 |
| 4 | November 29 | Rain or Shine | W 115–110 | Ivan Aska (28) | Aska, Perez (12) | CJ Perez (5) | Smart Araneta Coliseum | 3–1 |

December: 3–2

| Game | Date | Opponent | Score | High points | High rebounds | High assists | Location Attendance | Record |
|---|---|---|---|---|---|---|---|---|
| 5 | December 8 | NorthPort | L 101–115 | Ivan Aska (26) | Ivan Aska (8) | Chris Ross (6) | PhilSports Arena | 3–2 |
| 6 | December 10 | Magnolia | L 90–94 | Ivan Aska (29) | Aska, Lassiter (6) | Perez, Ross (6) | PhilSports Arena | 3–3 |
| 7 | December 15 | Barangay Ginebra | W 95–82 | Chris Ross (22) | Ivan Aska (8) | Chris Ross (6) | Smart Araneta Coliseum | 4–3 |
| 8 | December 17 | TNT | W 98–93 | Ivan Aska (25) | Ivan Aska (9) | Ivan Aska (4) | Ynares Center | 5–3 |
| 9 | December 25 | Phoenix Super LPG | W 117–96 | Bennie Boatwright (26) | Bennie Boatwright (16) | Terrence Romeo (8) | Smart Araneta Coliseum | 6–3 |

January: 2–0

| Game | Date | Opponent | Score | High points | High rebounds | High assists | Location Attendance | Record |
|---|---|---|---|---|---|---|---|---|
| 10 | January 7 | Terrafirma | W 132–110 | Bennie Boatwright (51) | Bennie Boatwright (12) | Chris Ross (10) | Smart Araneta Coliseum | 7–3 |
| 11 | January 12 | Blackwater | W 125–117 | Bennie Boatwright (44) | Bennie Boatwright (12) | Fajardo, Romeo (6) | Smart Araneta Coliseum | 8–3 |

=== Playoffs ===
==== Bracket ====
Quarterfinals (Top 4 twice-to-beat)
1 | Magnolia | 109
8 | TNT | 94
4 | Phoenix Super LPG | 107 | 88
5 | Meralco | 116*** | 84
2 | San Miguel | 127
7 | Rain or Shine | 122
3 | Barangay Ginebra | 106
6 | NorthPort | 93

Semifinals (Best-of-5)
1 | Magnolia | 3
4 | Phoenix Super LPG | 1
2 | San Miguel | 3
3 | Barangay Ginebra | 0

Finals (Best-of-7)
1 | Magnolia | 2
2 | San Miguel | 4

***Game went into triple overtime

==== Game log ====
2023–24 PBA Commissioner's Cup playoffs game log
Total: 8–2
Quarterfinals: 1–0

| Game | Date | Opponent | Score | High points | High rebounds | High assists | Location Attendance | Series |
|---|---|---|---|---|---|---|---|---|
| 1 | January 19 | Rain or Shine | W 127–122 | Bennie Boatwright (41) | June Mar Fajardo (13) | CJ Perez (7) | PhilSports Arena | 1–0 |

Semifinals: 3–0

| Game | Date | Opponent | Score | High points | High rebounds | High assists | Location Attendance | Series |
|---|---|---|---|---|---|---|---|---|
| 1 | January 24 | Barangay Ginebra | W 92–90 | CJ Perez (26) | Bennie Boatwright (12) | Chris Ross (6) | Smart Araneta Coliseum | 1–0 |
| 2 | January 26 | Barangay Ginebra | W 106–96 | Bennie Boatwright (38) | June Mar Fajardo (14) | Chris Ross (5) | SM Mall of Asia Arena | 2–0 |
| 3 | January 28 | Barangay Ginebra | W 94–91 | Bennie Boatwright (26) | Bennie Boatwright (13) | CJ Perez (4) | SM Mall of Asia Arena; 15,126 | 3–0 |

Finals: 4–2

| Game | Date | Opponent | Score | High points | High rebounds | High assists | Location Attendance | Series |
|---|---|---|---|---|---|---|---|---|
| 1 | February 2 | Magnolia | W 103–95 | Bennie Boatwright (28) | Bennie Boatwright (16) | Chris Ross (7) | SM Mall of Asia Arena | 1–0 |
| 2 | February 4 | Magnolia | W 109–85 | Bennie Boatwright (34) | June Mar Fajardo (14) | Boatwright, Ross (5) | SM Mall of Asia Arena | 2–0 |
| 3 | February 7 | Magnolia | L 80–88 | Bennie Boatwright (27) | Boatwright, Fajardo (13) | Ross, Teng 3 | Smart Araneta Coliseum | 2–1 |
| 4 | February 9 | Magnolia | L 85–96 | June Mar Fajardo (18) | Bennie Boatwright (14) | Jericho Cruz (7) | Smart Araneta Coliseum | 2–2 |
| 5 | February 11 | Magnolia | W 108–98 | Jericho Cruz (30) | June Mar Fajardo (15) | CJ Perez (5) | Smart Araneta Coliseum | 3–2 |
| 6 | February 14 | Magnolia | W 104–102 | CJ Perez (28) | Bennie Boatwright (13) | Bennie Boatwright (8) | Smart Araneta Coliseum | 4–2 |

== Philippine Cup ==
=== Eliminations ===
==== Standings ====
| Pos | Team | W | L | PCT | GB | Qualification |
|---|---|---|---|---|---|---|
| 1 | San Miguel Beermen | 10 | 1 | .909 | — | Twice-to-beat in the quarterfinals |
| 2 | Barangay Ginebra San Miguel | 7 | 4 | .636 | 3 | Twice-to-beat in the quarterfinals |
| 3 | Meralco Bolts | 6 | 5 | .545 (Note: Head-to-head quotient: Meralco 1.06, TNT 1.03, Rain or Shine 1.01, NLEX 0.99, Magnolia 0.90) | 4 | Best-of-three quarterfinals |
| 4 | TNT Tropang Giga | 6 | 5 | .545 | 4 | Best-of-three quarterfinals |
| 5 | Rain or Shine Elasto Painters | 6 | 5 | .545 | 4 | Best-of-three quarterfinals |
| 6 | NLEX Road Warriors | 6 | 5 | .545 | 4 | Best-of-three quarterfinals |
| 7 | Magnolia Chicken Timplados Hotshots | 6 | 5 | .545 | 4 | Twice-to-win in the quarterfinals |
| 8 | Terrafirma Dyip | 5 | 6 | .455 (Note: Eighth seed playoff: Terrafirma 104–96 NorthPort) | 5 | Twice-to-win in the quarterfinals |
| 9 | NorthPort Batang Pier | 5 | 6 | .455 | 5 | |
| 10 | Blackwater Bossing | 4 | 7 | .364 | 6 | |
| 11 | Phoenix Fuel Masters | 3 | 8 | .273 | 7 | |
| 12 | Converge FiberXers | 2 | 9 | .182 | 8 | |

Source: PBA.ph
Rules for classification: 1) winning percentage; 2) if two teams are tied, head-to-head record; if three or more teams are tied, head-to-head goal average (quotient); if tied for 8th, one-game playoff; 3) overall quotient; 4) coin toss

==== Game log ====
2024 PBA Philippine Cup game log
Total: 10–1
March: 3–0

| Game | Date | Opponent | Score | High points | High rebounds | High assists | Location Attendance | Record |
|---|---|---|---|---|---|---|---|---|
| 1 | March 15 | Rain or Shine | W 109–97 | Jericho Cruz (20) | Rodney Brondial (11) | Terrence Romeo (6) | Smart Araneta Coliseum | 1–0 |
| 2 | March 17 | TNT | W 91–89 | June Mar Fajardo (15) | June Mar Fajardo (17) | Terrence Romeo (4) | Ynares Center | 2–0 |
All-Star Break
| 3 | March 31 | Phoenix | W 116–102 | CJ Perez (32) | June Mar Fajardo (12) | Marcio Lassiter (8) | Smart Araneta Coliseum | 3–0 |

April: 6–0

| Game | Date | Opponent | Score | High points | High rebounds | High assists | Location Attendance | Record |
|---|---|---|---|---|---|---|---|---|
| 4 | April 5 | Barangay Ginebra | W 95–92 | CJ Perez (18) | June Mar Fajardo (10) | CJ Perez (10) | Smart Araneta Coliseum | 4–0 |
| 5 | April 10 | Terrafirma | W 113–110 | CJ Perez (25) | June Mar Fajardo (17) | June Mar Fajardo (6) | Ninoy Aquino Stadium | 5–0 |
| 6 | April 19 | Converge | W 112–103 | CJ Perez (25) | June Mar Fajardo (17) | Chris Ross (4) | PhilSports Arena | 6–0 |
| 7 | April 21 | NorthPort | W 120–100 | CJ Perez (29) | Fajardo, Perez (9) | Terrence Romeo (7) | PhilSports Arena | 7–0 |
| 8 | April 26 | Magnolia | W 98–91 | CJ Perez (25) | Fajardo, Tautuaa (7) | June Mar Fajardo (7) | Smart Araneta Coliseum | 8–0 |
| 9 | April 28 | NLEX | W 120–103 | CJ Perez (30) | June Mar Fajardo (21) | Chris Ross (4) | PhilSports Arena | 9–0 |

May: 1–1

| Game | Date | Opponent | Score | High points | High rebounds | High assists | Location Attendance | Record |
|---|---|---|---|---|---|---|---|---|
| 10 | May 1 | Blackwater | W 124–109 | CJ Perez (26) | June Mar Fajardo (16) | CJ Perez (5) | PhilSports Arena | 10–0 |
| 11 | May 4 | Meralco | L 92–95 | June Mar Fajardo (23) | June Mar Fajardo (19) | June Mar Fajardo (4) | Batangas City Sports Center | 10–1 |

=== Playoffs ===
==== Bracket ====
Quarterfinals
(#1 twice-to-beat)
1 | San Miguel | 95 | 110
8 | Terrafirma | 106 | 91
(Best-of-3)
4 | TNT | 1
5 | Rain or Shine | 2
(#2 twice-to-beat)
2 | Barangay Ginebra | 99
7 | Magnolia | 77
(Best-of-3)
3 | Meralco | 2
6 | NLEX | 0

Semifinals (Best-of-7)
1 | San Miguel | 4
5 | Rain or Shine | 0
2 | Barangay Ginebra | 3
3 | Meralco | 4

Finals (Best-of-7)
1 | San Miguel | 2
3 | Meralco | 4

==== Game log ====
2024 PBA Philippine Cup playoffs game log
Total: 7–5
Quarterfinals: 1–1

| Game | Date | Opponent | Score | High points | High rebounds | High assists | Location Attendance | Series |
|---|---|---|---|---|---|---|---|---|
| 1 | May 11 | Terrafirma | L 95–106 | June Mar Fajardo (21) | June Mar Fajardo (16) | Chris Ross (4) | Rizal Memorial Coliseum | 0–1 |
| 2 | May 15 | Terrafirma | W 110–91 | June Mar Fajardo (25) | June Mar Fajardo (22) | CJ Perez (8) | Ninoy Aquino Stadium | 1–1 |

Semifinals: 4–0

| Game | Date | Opponent | Score | High points | High rebounds | High assists | Location Attendance | Series |
|---|---|---|---|---|---|---|---|---|
| 1 | May 17 | Rain or Shine | W 101–98 | June Mar Fajardo (23) | Fajardo, Tautuaa (11) | June Mar Fajardo (5) | Mall of Asia Arena | 1–0 |
| 2 | May 19 | Rain or Shine | W 106–89 | June Mar Fajardo (22) | CJ Perez (11) | Terrence Romeo (5) | Mall of Asia Arena | 2–0 |
| 3 | May 22 | Rain or Shine | W 117–107 | CJ Perez (23) | CJ Perez (14) | CJ Perez (5) | Dasmariñas Arena | 3–0 |
| 4 | May 24 | Rain or Shine | W 107–100 | CJ Perez (26) | June Mar Fajardo (23) | June Mar Fajardo (6) | Mall of Asia Arena | 4–0 |

Finals: 2–4

| Game | Date | Opponent | Score | High points | High rebounds | High assists | Location Attendance | Series |
|---|---|---|---|---|---|---|---|---|
| 1 | June 5 | Meralco | L 86–93 | June Mar Fajardo (23) | June Mar Fajardo (10) | Chris Ross (6) | Smart Araneta Coliseum | 0–1 |
| 2 | June 7 | Meralco | W 95–94 | CJ Perez (34) | June Mar Fajardo (13) | Chris Ross (6) | Smart Araneta Coliseum | 1–1 |
| 3 | June 9 | Meralco | L 89–93 | Moala Tautuaa (19) | June Mar Fajardo (15) | Chris Ross (4) | Smart Araneta Coliseum | 1–2 |
| 4 | June 12 | Meralco | W 111–101 | June Mar Fajardo (28) | June Mar Fajardo (13) | Perez, Ross (6) | Smart Araneta Coliseum | 2–2 |
| 5 | June 14 | Meralco | L 88–92 | June Mar Fajardo (38) | June Mar Fajardo (18) | Moala Tautuaa (4) | Smart Araneta Coliseum | 2–3 |
| 6 | June 16 | Meralco | L 78–80 | June Mar Fajardo (21) | June Mar Fajardo (12) | June Mar Fajardo (5) | Smart Araneta Coliseum | 2–4 |

== Transactions ==
=== Free agency ===
==== Signings ====
| Player | Date signed | Contract amount | Contract length | Former team |
|---|---|---|---|---|
| Nonoy Baclao | July 17, 2023 | Not disclosed | Not disclosed | Meralco Bolts |
| Terrence Romeo | September 20, 2023 | Not disclosed | 2 years | Re-signed |
| Jeron Teng | October 18, 2023 | Not disclosed | 2 years | Converge FiberXers |

==== Subtractions ====
| Player | Number | Position | Reason | New team |
|---|---|---|---|---|
| Robbie Herndon | 11 | Small forward / Shooting guard | End of contract | NLEX Road Warriors |

=== Trades ===
==== Commissioner's Cup ====
December
December 11, 2023
| December 11, 2023 | To San Miguel Don Trollano | To NLEX Robert Bolick; Kent Salado | To NorthPort Ben Adamos; Allyn Bulanadi; Jeepy Faundo; Kris Rosales; 2023 Blackwater second-round pick (from NLEX); 2025 San Miguel second-round pick |

=== Recruited imports ===
| Tournament | Name | Debuted | Last game | Record |
|---|---|---|---|---|
| Commissioner's Cup | Ivan Aska | November 15, 2023 (vs. NLEX) | December 17, 2023 (vs. TNT) | 5–3 |
| Commissioner's Cup | Bennie Boatwright | December 25, 2023 (vs. Phoenix Super LPG) | February 14, 2024 (vs. Magnolia) | 11–2 |

== Awards ==
| Recipient | Award | Date awarded |
|---|---|---|
| CJ Perez | 2023–24 PBA Commissioner's Cup Best Player of the Conference | February 9, 2024 |
| CJ Perez | 2023–24 PBA Commissioner's Cup Finals Most Valuable Player | February 14, 2024 |
| June Mar Fajardo | 2024 PBA Philippine Cup Best Player of the Conference | June 12, 2024 |
| June Mar Fajardo | 2023–24 PBA Most Valuable Player | August 18, 2024 |
Honors
| CJ Perez | 2023–24 PBA Mythical First Team | August 18, 2024 |
| June Mar Fajardo | 2023–24 PBA Mythical First Team | August 18, 2024 |
| June Mar Fajardo | 2023–24 PBA All-Defensive Team | August 18, 2024 |
