= Adrian Nocum =

Filipino basketball player

No. 1 – Rain or Shine Elasto Painters
- Position: Shooting guard / point guard
- League: PBA

Personal information
- Born: August 10, 1999 (age 27)
- Listed height: 6 ft 0 in (1.83 m)

Career information
- College: Mapúa
- PBA draft: 2023: 2nd round, 24th overall pick
- Drafted by: Rain or Shine Elasto Painters
- Playing career: 2023–present

Career history
- 2021, 2023: San Juan Knights
- 2023–present: Rain or Shine Elasto Painters

Career highlights
- PBA All-Star (2026); PBA All-Rookie Team (2024); MPBL All-Star (2023); MPBL Rookie of the Year (2023); PSL All-Star (2023)

Adrian Clarence Go Nocum (born August 10, 1999) is a Filipino professional basketball player for the Rain or Shine Elasto Painters of the Philippine Basketball Association (PBA).

Nocum played for the Mapúa Cardinals during his college career. He started his professional career with the San Juan Knights of the Maharlika Pilipinas Basketball League (MPBL) during the 2021 MPBL Invitational, and returned with the team in 2023, forgoing the remainder of his time with Mapúa. In his lone season in the MPBL, Nocum won Rookie of the Year as well as an all-star nod.

During the PBA season 48 draft in 2023, he was selected 24th overall by the Rain or Shine Elasto Painters.

== College career ==
Adrian Nocum played his college career with the Mapúa Cardinals. He last played for the Cardinals in 2022 during NCAA Season 98.

== Professional career ==
=== San Juan Knights (2021, 2023) ===
Nocum's first professional gig was with the San Juan Knights of the Maharlika Pilipinas Basketball League. He was part of the team's 2021 MPBL Invitational roster where he averaged 6.8 points and four rebounds in the four games he played in.

In 2023, Nocum returned to San Juan for the 2023 MPBL season, originally as a Special Guest License player, but ultimately stayed with the team full-time. Nocum was a key player in San Juan's division finals run that season, averaging 11.8 points, 6 rebounds, 2.9 assists, 1.6 steals, and 0.6 blocks, earning an all-star nod and the MPBL Rookie of the Year award for the season.

=== Rain or Shine Elasto Painters (2023–present) ===
On September 17, 2023, Nocum was selected 24th overall by the Rain or Shine Elasto Painters of the Philippine Basketball Association during the season 48 draft. Following San Juan's elimination from the 2023 MPBL playoffs, Nocum signed a two-year deal with Rain or Shine on November 27, 2023.

== Career statistics ==
=== PBA ===
Legend
GP	Games played	MPG	Minutes per game	FG%	Field-goal percentage
3FG%	3-point field-goal percentage	4P%	4-point field-goal percentage	FT%	Free-throw percentage
RPG	Rebounds per game	APG	Assists per game	SPG	Steals per game
BPG	Blocks per game	PPG	Points per game	127	Career high

As of the end of 2025–26 season

=== Season-by-season averages ===
Year	Team	GP	MPG	FG%	3P%	4P%	FT%	RPG	APG	SPG	BPG	PPG
2023–24	Rain or Shine	24	21.1	.466	.316	—	.625	3.4	2.8	.9	.2	11.7
2024–25	Rain or Shine	59	26.4	.471	.330	.188	.667	3.7	2.9	1.1	.3	13.7
2024–25	Rain or Shine	46	27.7	.439	.324	.130	.657	3.7	4.0	1.5	.4	16.1
Career		129	25.9	.446	.325	.154	.656	3.7	3.3	1.2	.3	14.2

=== MPBL ===
Year	Team	GP	GS	MPG	FG%	3P%	FT%	RPG	APG	SPG	BPG	PPG
2023	San Juan	33	27	23.6	.500	.324	.640	6.0	2.9	1.6	.6	11.8
