= Kris Porter (basketball) =

Filipino basketball player

No. 14 – GenSan Warriors
- Position: Center
- League: MPBL

Personal information
- Born: September 2, 1994 (age 32)
- Listed height: 6 ft 5 in (1.96 m)
- Listed weight: 195 lb (88 kg)

Career information
- High school: Ateneo de Cebu (Mandaue)
- College: Ateneo (2012; 2014; 2016–2017)
- PBA draft: 2018: 2nd round, 16th overall pick
- Drafted by: NLEX Road Warriors
- Playing career: 2018–present

Career history
- 2018: Navotas Clutch
- 2019–2022: NLEX Road Warriors
- 2022: Phoenix Super LPG Fuel Masters
- 2024–2025: Batangas City Tanduay Rum Masters
- 2025–2026: Rain or Shine Elasto Painters
- 2026–present: GenSan Warriors

Career highlights
- 2× UAAP champion (2012, 2017)

Kristoffer James Porter (born September 2, 1994) is a Filipino professional basketball player for the GenSan Warriors of the Maharlika Pilipinas Basketball League (MPBL). He was selected 16th overall in the 2018 PBA draft.

== PBA career statistics ==
Legend
GP	Games played	MPG	Minutes per game	FG%	Field-goal percentage
3FG%	3-point field-goal percentage	4P%	4-point field-goal percentage	FT%	Free-throw percentage
RPG	Rebounds per game	APG	Assists per game	SPG	Steals per game
BPG	Blocks per game	PPG	Points per game	127	Career high

As of the end of 2024–25 season

=== Season-by-season averages ===
Year	Team	GP	MPG	FG%	3P%	4P%	FT%	RPG	APG	SPG	BPG	PPG
2019	NLEX	9	15.9	.341	.227	—	.667	3.6	1.8	.3	.1	4.8
2020	NLEX	8	21.4	.386	.444	—	.800	3.6	.3	.8	—	6.3
2021	NLEX	17	15.7	.375	.067	—	.786	1.6	.5	.1	.1	3.5
2021	Phoenix Super LPG	17	15.7	.375	.067	—	.786	1.6	.5	.1	.1	3.5
2022–23	Phoenix Super LPG	9	7.7	.353	.500	—	.750	.4	.3	.2	—	1.8
2024–25	Rain or Shine	7	11.7	.333	.182	—	.800	1.3	.6	.1	—	3.4
Career		50	14.7	.362	.250	—	.756	2.0	.7	.3	.1	3.9
