= Leonard Santillan =

Filipino basketball player

No. 25 – Rain or Shine Elasto Painters
- Position: Power forward / center
- League: PBA

Personal information
- Born: March 5, 1996 (age 30) Lapu-Lapu City, Philippines
- Listed height: 6 ft 4 in (1.93 m)
- Listed weight: 210 lb (95 kg)

Career information
- College: UV (2014–2015); De La Salle (2017–2018)
- PBA draft: 2020: 1st round, 5th overall pick
- Drafted by: Rain or Shine Elasto Painters
- Playing career: 2019–present

Career history
- 2019: Bataan Risers
- 2019–2020: Zamboanga Family's Brand Sardines
- 2021–present: Rain or Shine Elasto Painters

Career highlights
- PBA All-Star (2026); PBA All-Rookie Team (2021)

Leonard "Santi" A. Santillan (born March 5, 1996) is a Filipino professional basketball player for the Rain or Shine Elasto Painters of the Philippine Basketball Association (PBA).

== Professional career ==
On January 24, 2024, Santillan signed a three-year contract extension with the Elasto Painters.

== PBA career statistics ==
Legend
GP	Games played	MPG	Minutes per game	FG%	Field-goal percentage
3FG%	3-point field-goal percentage	4P%	4-point field-goal percentage	FT%	Free-throw percentage
RPG	Rebounds per game	APG	Assists per game	SPG	Steals per game
BPG	Blocks per game	PPG	Points per game	127	Career high

As of the end of 2025–26 season

=== Season-by-season averages ===
Year	Team	GP	MPG	FG%	3P%	4P%	FT%	RPG	APG	SPG	BPG	PPG
2021	Rain or Shine	23	14.5	.424	.333	—	.684	4.2	.5	.2	.3	5.9
2022–23	Rain or Shine	34	23.9	.399	.266	—	.667	6.0	.9	.4	.4	10.5
2023–24	Rain or Shine	30	29.8	.449	.309	—	.669	6.6	2.1	.5	.3	15.0
2024–25	Rain or Shine	59	24.6	.412	.286	.000	.533	5.4	1.4	.2	.3	10.4
2025–26	Rain or Shine	36	19.4	.370	.298	.000	.467	4.9	.8	.4	.1	6.5
Career		182	23.0	.412	.292	.000	.611	5.5	1.2	.3	.3	9.8
