= List of Rain or Shine Elasto Painters seasons =

The Rain or Shine Elasto Painters joined the Philippine Basketball Association (PBA) in 2006 following the acquisition of the Shell Turbo Chargers franchise of Pilipinas Shell Petroleum Corporation by Welcoat. The team began play as the Welcoat Dragons in the 2006–07 PBA season.

== Records per conference ==
Conference champions	Conference runners-up	Conference semifinalists

=== Two-conference era (2006–2010) ===
Season	Conference	Team name	Elimination/classification round						Playoffs	
Season	Conference	Team name	Finish	GP	W	L	PCT	GB	Stage	Results
2006-07	Philippine	Welcoat Dragons	10th	18	3	15	.167	10	Did not qualify	
2006-07	Fiesta	Welcoat Dragons	10th	18	4	14	.222	9	Did not qualify	
2007-08	Philippine	Welcoat Dragons	10th/10	18	3	15	.167	9	Did not qualify	
2007-08	Fiesta	Welcoat Dragons	10th/10	18	4	14	.222	8	Did not qualify	
2008-09	Philippine	Rain or Shine Elasto Painters	4th/10	18	10	8	.556	2	Quarterfinals	Sta. Lucia 2, Rain or Shine 0
2008-09	Fiesta	Rain or Shine Elasto Painters	3rd/10	14	8	6	.571	3	2nd-seed playoff Wildcard phase Quarterfinals; Semifinals; 3rd-place playoff	Barangay Ginebra 114, Rain or Shine 71*; Rain or Shine** 96, Barako Bull 88; Rain or Shine 2, Purefoods 1 Barangay Ginebra 4, Rain or Shine 2 Burger King 132, Rain or Shine 118*
2009-10	Philippine	Rain or Shine Elasto Painters	9th/10	18	4	14	.222	9	1st wildcard round 2nd wildcard round Quarterfinals	Rain or Shine 90, Sta. Lucia 86*; Rain or Shine 99, Coca-Cola 84*; Purefoods 3, Rain or Shine 2
2009-10	Fiesta	Rain or Shine Elasto Painters	6th/10	18	9	9	.500	6	5th-seed playoff 1st wildcard round 2nd wildcard round Quarterfinals	Barangay Ginebra 115, Rain or Shine 88*; Rain or Shine 92, Air21 88*; Rain or Shine 98, Coca-Cola 93*; B-Meg Derby Ace 3, Rain or Shine 2
Elimination/classification round				140	45	95	.321	—	4 post-wildcard appearances	
Playoffs				28	13	15	.464	—	0 Finals appearances	
Cumulative totals				168	58	110	.345	—	0 championships	

*one-game playoffs
**team had twice-to-beat advantage

=== Three-conference era (2010–present) ===
Season	Conference	Team name	Elimination round						Playoffs	
Season	Conference	Team name	Finish	GP	W	L	PCT	GB	Stage	Results
2010-11	Philippine	Rain or Shine Elasto Painters	8th/10	14	5	9	.357	6	Quarterfinals	Talk 'N Text** 107, Rain or Shine 92
2010-11	Commissioner's	Rain or Shine Elasto Painters	6th/10	9	4	5	.444	4	Quarterfinals	Barangay Ginebra 2, Rain or Shine 1
2010-11	Governors'	Rain or Shine Elasto Painters	5th/9	8	4	4	.500	2	Semifinals	5th overall (6–7), 2–3 in semifinals
2011-12	Philippine	Rain or Shine Elasto Painters	5th/10	14	9	5	.643	1	Quarterfinals; Semifinals	Rain or Shine 2, Barangay Ginebra 0 Powerade 4, Rain or Shine 3
2011-12	Commissioner's	Rain or Shine Elasto Painters	8th/10	9	3	6	.333	4	Did not qualify	
2011-12	Governors'	Rain or Shine Elasto Painters	1st/10	9	8	1	.889	--	Semifinals; Finals	1st overall (10–4), 2–3 in semifinals Rain or Shine 4, B-Meg 3
2012-13	Philippine	Rain or Shine Elasto Painters	3rd/10	14	9	5	.643	2	Quarterfinals; Semifinals; Finals	Rain or Shine 2, Barangay Ginebra 1 Rain or Shine 4, San Mig Coffee 2 Talk 'N Text 4, Rain or Shine 0
2012-13	Commissioner's	Rain or Shine Elasto Painters	2nd/10	14	9	5	.643	2	Quarterfinals	Barangay Ginebra def. Rain or Shine** in 2 games
2012-13	Governors'	Rain or Shine Elasto Painters	3rd/10	9	5	4	.556	3	Quarterfinals; Semifinals	Rain or Shine** 108, GlobalPort 106; Petron 3, Rain or Shine 1
2013-14	Philippine	Rain or Shine Elasto Painters	2nd/10	14	11	3	.786	--	Quarterfinals; Semifinals; Finals	Rain or Shine** 106, GlobalPort 96; Rain or Shine 4, Petron 1 San Mig Super Coffee 4, Rain or Shine 2
2013-14	Commissioner's	Rain or Shine Elasto Painters	4th/10	9	5	4	.556	4	Quarterfinals; Semifinals	Rain or Shine 2, Meralco 1 Talk 'N Text 3, Rain or Shine 0
2013-14	Governors'	Rain or Shine Elasto Painters	2nd/10	9	6	3	.667	1	Quarterfinals; Semifinals; Finals	Rain or Shine** 111, Air21 90; Rain or Shine 3, Alaska 2 San Mig Super Coffee 3, Rain or Shine 2
2014-15	Philippine	Rain or Shine Elasto Painters	2nd/12	11	9	2	.818	--	Semifinals	Alaska 4, Rain or Shine 2
2014-15	Commissioner's	Rain or Shine Elasto Painters	1st/12	11	8	3	.727	--	Quarterfinals; Semifinals; Finals	Rain or Shine** 92, Barangay Ginebra 91; Rain or Shine 3, Meralco 0 Talk 'N Text 4, Rain or Shine 3
2014-15	Governors'	Rain or Shine Elasto Painters	3rd/12	11	7	4	.636	1	Quarterfinals; Semifinals	Rain or Shine** 134, Barako Bull 132 (2OT); San Miguel 3, Rain or Shine 1
2015-16	Philippine	Rain or Shine Elasto Painters	3rd/12	11	8	3	.727	1	Quarterfinals (Phase 1); Quarterfinals (Phase 2); Semifinals	Rain or Shine** 95, Blackwater 90; Rain or Shine 104, TNT 89*; San Miguel 4, Rain or Shine 2
2015-16	Commissioner's	Rain or Shine Elasto Painters	5th/12	11	7	4	.636	1	Quarterfinals; Semifinals; Finals	Rain or Shine 2, Barangay Ginebra 0 Rain or Shine 3, San Miguel 1 Rain or Shine 4, Alaska 2
2015-16	Governors'	Rain or Shine Elasto Painters	8th/12	11	5	6	.455	5	8th seed playoffs	Phoenix 105, Rain or Shine 94*
2016-17	Philippine	Rain or Shine Elasto Painters	8th/12	11	5	6	.455	5	8th seed playoffs Quarterfinals	Rain or Shine 103, Blackwater 80*; San Miguel** 98, Rain or Shine 91
2016-17	Commissioner's	Rain or Shine Elasto Painters	6th/12	11	5	6	.455	4	Quarterfinals	Star 2, Rain or Shine 0
2016-17	Governors'	Rain or Shine Elasto Painters	7th/12	11	7	4	.636	2	Quarterfinals	TNT** def. Rain or Shine in 2 games
2017-18	Philippine	Rain or Shine Elasto Painters	5th/12	11	6	5	.545	2	Quarterfinals	Barangay Ginebra 2, Rain or Shine 0
2017-18	Commissioner's	Rain or Shine Elasto Painters	1st/12	11	9	2	.818	--	Quarterfinals; Semifinals	Rain or Shine** def. GlobalPort in 2 games Barangay Ginebra 3, Rain or Shine 1
2017-18	Governors'	Rain or Shine Elasto Painters	10th/12	11	3	8	.273	6	Did not qualify	
2019	Philippine	Rain or Shine Elasto Painters	2nd/12	11	8	3	.727	1	Quarterfinals; Semifinals	Rain or Shine** 91, NorthPort 85; Magnolia 4, Rain or Shine 3
2019	Commissioner's	Rain or Shine Elasto Painters	6th/12	11	5	6	.455	5	Quarterfinals; Semifinals	Rain or Shine 2, Blackwater 1 San Miguel 3, Rain or Shine 1
2019	Governors'	Rain or Shine Elasto Painters	9th/12	11	4	7	.364	4	Did not qualify	
2020	Philippine	Rain or Shine Elasto Painters	8th/12	11	6	5	.545	2	Quarterfinals	Barangay Ginebra** 81, Rain or Shine 73
2021	Philippine	Rain or Shine Elasto Painters	6th/12	11	6	5	.545	4	Quarterfinals	Magnolia 2, Rain or Shine 0
2021	Governors'	Rain or Shine Elasto Painters	10th/12	11	3	8	.273	6	Did not qualify	
2022–23	Philippine	Rain or Shine Elasto Painters	9th/12	11	4	7	.364	5	Did not qualify	
2022–23	Commissioner's	Rain or Shine Elasto Painters	8th/13	12	5	7	.417	5	8th-seed playoff Quarterfinals	Rain or Shine 110, NLEX 100*; Bay Area** 126, Rain or Shine 96
2022–23	Governors'	Rain or Shine Elasto Painters	10th/12	11	2	9	.182	9	Did not qualify	
2023–24	Commissioner's	Rain or Shine Elasto Painters	7th/12	11	6	5	.545	3	Quarterfinals	San Miguel** 127, Rain or Shine 122
2023–24	Philippine	Rain or Shine Elasto Painters	5th/12	11	6	5	.545	4	Quarterfinals; Semifinals	Rain or Shine 2, TNT 1 San Miguel 4, Rain or Shine 0
2024–25	Governors'	Rain or Shine Elasto Painters	1st in Group B	10	7	3	.700	--	Quarterfinals; Semifinals	Rain or Shine 3, Magnolia 2 TNT 4, Rain or Shine 1
2024–25	Commissioner's	Rain or Shine Elasto Painters	6th/13	12	7	5	.583	2	Quarterfinals; Semifinals	Rain or Shine 2, Converge 1 TNT 4, Rain or Shine 1
2024–25	Philippine	Rain or Shine Elasto Painters	7th/12	11	6	5	.545	2	Quarterfinals; Semifinals	Rain or Shine def. NLEX** in 2 games TNT 4, Rain or Shine 2
Elimination round				419	232	187	.554	—	20 semifinals appearances	
Playoffs				190	86	104	.453	—	6 Finals appearance	
Cumulative records				609	318	291	.522	—	2 championships	

*one-game playoffs
**team had the twice-to-beat advantage

== Records per season ==
League season	Team season	GP	W	L	PCT	Best finish
2006–07	2006–07	36	7	29	.194	10th place
2007–08	2007–08	36	7	29	.194	10th place
2008–09	2008–09	45	23	22	.511	4th place (Fiesta)
2009–10	2009–10	51	21	30	.412	Quarterfinals (Philippine & Fiesta)
2010–11	2010–11	40	16	24	.400	Semifinals (Governors')
2011–12	2011–12	53	31	22	.585	Champions (Governors')
2012–13	2012–13	57	31	26	.544	Runner-up (Philippine)
2013–14	2013–14	61	37	24	.607	Runner-up (Philippine & Governors')
2014–15	2014–15	55	35	20	.636	Runner-up (Commissioner's)
2015–16	2015–16	54	33	21	.611	Champions (Commissioner's)
2016–17	2016–17	39	19	20	.487	Quarterfinals (Philippine, Commissioner's & Governors')
2017–18	2017–18	41	20	21	.488	Semifinals (Commissioner's)
2019	2019	48	24	24	.500	Semifinals (Philippine & Commissioner's)
2020	2020	12	6	6	.500	Quarterfinals (Philippine)
2021	2021	24	9	15	.375	Quarterfinals (Philippine)
2022–23	2022–23	36	12	24	.333	Quarterfinals (Commissioner's)
2023–24	2023–24	30	14	16	.467	Semifinals (Philippine)
2024–25	2024–25	59	31	28	.525	Semifinals (Governors', Commissioner's & Philippine)

== Cumulative records ==
Era	GP	W	L	PCT
Two-conference era (2006–2010)	168	58	110	.345
Three-conference era (2010–present)	609	318	291	.522
Total	777	376	401	.484
