= Aaron Fuller (basketball) =

American basketball player (born 1989)

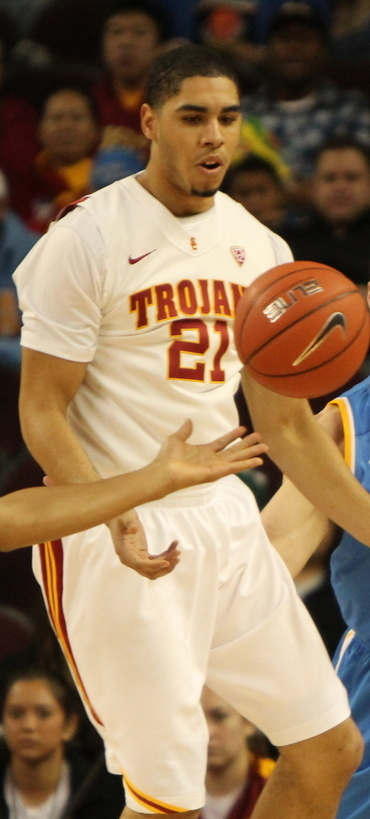
- Fuller with USC in 2012

Free agent
- Position: Power forward / small forward

Personal information
- Born: December 3, 1989 (age 36) Mesa, Arizona, U.S.
- Listed height: 6 ft 6 in (1.98 m)
- Listed weight: 235 lb (107 kg)

Career information
- High school: Mesa (Mesa, Arizona)
- College: Iowa (2008–2010); USC (2011–2013)
- NBA draft: 2013: undrafted
- Playing career: 2013–present

Career history
- 2013–2014: U.D. Oliveirense
- 2015: Taranaki Mountainairs
- 2015–2017: Fuerza Regia de Monterrey
- 2017: NLEX Road Warriors
- 2018: Racing
- 2018: NLEX Road Warriors
- 2018–2019: Hapoel Galil Elyon
- 2019: Soles de Mexicali
- 2019: Fuerza Regia de Monterrey
- 2019: Blackwater Elite
- 2019–2020: Fuerza Regia de Monterrey
- 2021: Club Malvín
- 2021: Fuerza Regia de Monterrey
- 2021–2022: TNT Tropang Giga
- 2022: Fuerza Regia de Monterrey
- 2023: Urunday Universitario
- 2023: Gigantes de Guayana
- 2023: Fuerza Regia de Monterrey
- 2024: Asociación de Básquetbol Ancud
- 2024: Rain or Shine Elasto Painters
- 2025–2026: RANS Simba Bogor
- 2025: Panteras de Aguascalientes
- 2026: Rain or Shine Elasto Painters

Career highlights
- All-IBL Second Team (2025); 2× Mexican League champion (2017, 2019); NBL All-Star Five (2015); NBL scoring champion (2015)

Aaron Craig Fuller (born December 3, 1989) is an American-Mexican professional basketball player who last played for the Rain or Shine Elasto Painters of the Philippine Basketball Association (PBA). He played college basketball for the University of Iowa and the University of Southern California before playing professionally in Portugal, New Zealand, Mexico, the Philippines, Luxembourg, Israel, Uruguay, Venezuela, and Chile.

== High school career ==
Fuller attended Mesa High School in Mesa, Arizona, where he earned all-state and all-conference honors as a junior and senior. As a senior in 2007–08, he averaged 24.5 points, 10.8 rebounds and 2.1 blocked shots per game, as he led Mesa to a 17–11 record and an East Valley Region championship. He was named East Valley Region Player of the Year and East Valley Tribune Player of the Year, and was named Player of the Year for Class 4A-5A in Arizona by the Arizona Republic.

== College career ==
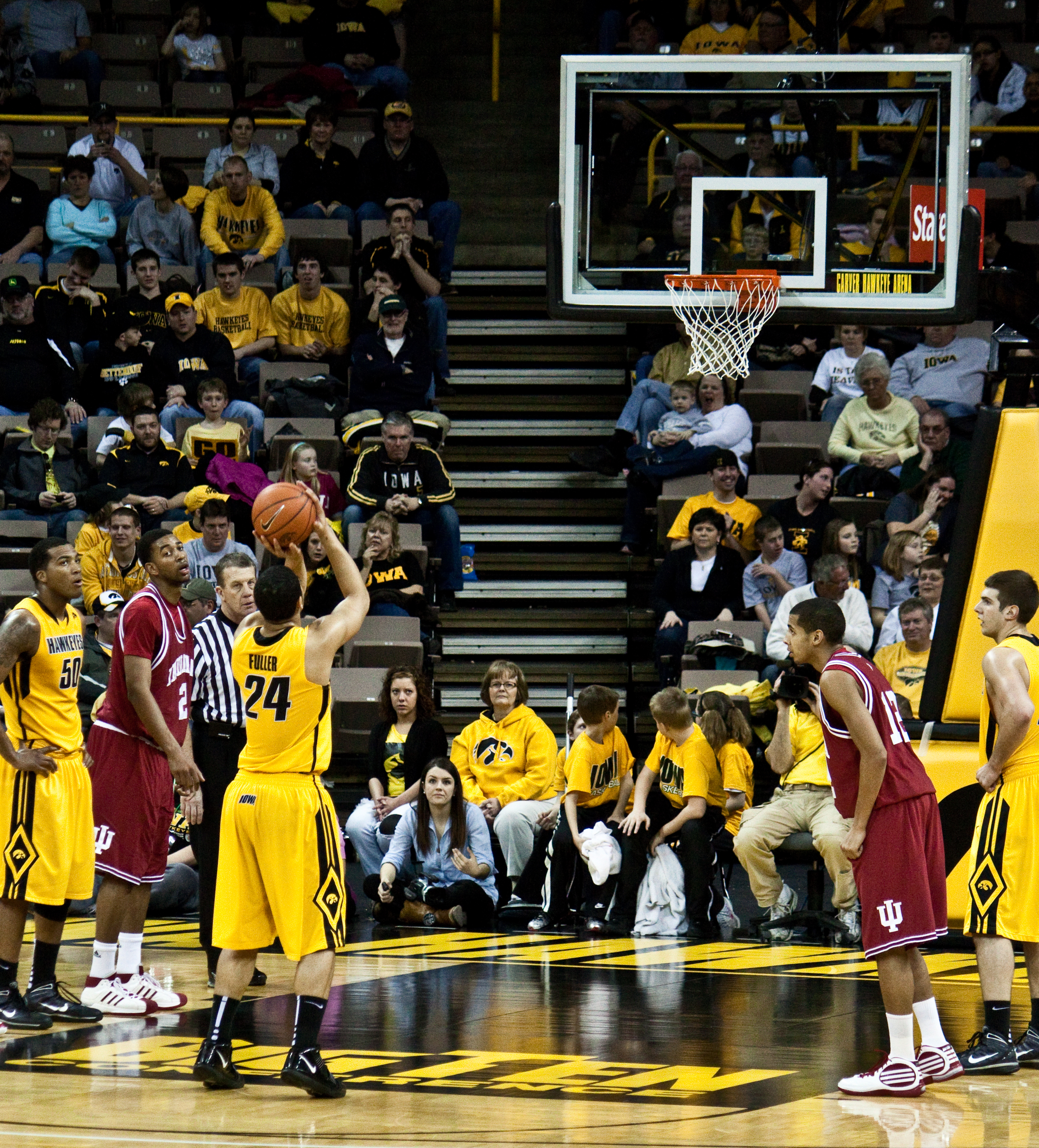
Fuller (shooting) with Iowa in February 2010

As a freshman for Iowa in 2008–09, Fuller appeared in 32 games with 19 starts, while averaging 4.0 points and 2.7 points per game. He scored a season-high 16 points against Penn State on January 24.

As a sophomore in 2009–10, Fuller earned All-Big Ten Honorable Mention honors after averaging 9.7 points and a team-leading 6.2 rebounds in 30 games (22 starts). He posted a team-best six double-doubles and led Iowa in rebounding a team-best 14 times, including 12 of the last 16 games. On February 16, he recorded career-highs of 30 points and 13 rebounds against Michigan.

On April 9, 2010, Fuller announced his decision to leave the Hawkeyes basketball program in order to move closer to home and his family. Less than a month later, on May 4, he signed with USC and subsequently redshirted the 2010–11 season due to NCAA transfer regulations.

As a redshirted junior in 2011–12, Fuller suffered a labral tear in his left (shooting) shoulder in October, and in December he suffered one in his right shoulder. He was later ruled out for the rest of the season in January due to the injuries, opting to have season-ending surgery to deal with the labrum tear in his left shoulder. Shooting with his non-preferred right hand for most of the season, he was second on the Trojans team in scoring (10.6) and first in rebounding (5.9).

As a senior in 2012–13, Fuller's role was dramatically reduced as he started just six games and averaged 14.7 minutes per game. He scored a season-high 15 points against UCLA and finished the season with averages of 4.1 points and 3.6 rebounds in 32 games. At the Trojans' annual awards banquet on April 9, he received the John Rudometkin Award for giving 110% effort throughout the season.

=== College statistics ===
Year	Team	GP	GS	MPG	FG%	3P%	FT%	RPG	APG	SPG	BPG	PPG
2008–09	Iowa	32	19	17.2	.364	.297	.440	2.7	.4	.4	.3	4.0
2009–10	Iowa	30	22	24.4	.477	.200	.676	6.2	.7	.4	.3	9.7
2011–12	USC	18	18	29.2	.515	.000	.631	5.9	.4	.9	.4	10.6
2012–13	USC	32	6	14.7	.505	.000	.667	3.6	.2	.4	.3	4.1
Career		112	65	20.3	.465	.269	.636	4.4	.4	.5	.3	6.6

== Professional career ==
=== U.D. Oliveirense (2013–2014) ===
On September 20, 2013, Fuller signed with U.D. Oliveirense of Portugal for the 2013–14 LPB season. He appeared in all 20 games for Oliveirense in 2013–14, averaging 18.2 points, 9.7 rebounds, 1.1 assists and 1.3 steals per game.

=== Taranaki Mountainairs (2015) ===
In January 2015, Fuller signed with the Taranaki Mountainairs for the 2015 New Zealand NBL season. On April 14, he was named co-Player of the Week for Round 2 alongside Southland Sharks forward Tai Wesley. In the Mountainairs' final game of the season on June 28 against the Super City Rangers, Fuller set an NBL record for points scored in a game with 54 on 25-of-34 shooting. He also recorded a season-high 19 rebounds in a two-point loss to the Rangers, and subsequently earned Round 13 Player of the Week honors. In 18 games for Taranaki, he averaged a league-leading 28.4 points, 9.5 rebounds and 1.3 steals per game, and earned All-Star Five honors. Despite his great season, the Mountainairs failed to win a game in what was just the fourth winless season for an NBL team in league history.

=== Fuerza Regia (2015–2017) ===
On September 22, 2015, Fuller signed with Fuerza Regia of Mexico for the 2015–16 LNBP season. On November 26, he had a season-best game with 22 points and 7 rebounds in a loss to Soles de Mexicali. He later scored 19 points against Abejas de Guanajuato on January 17, and had an 18-point game on February 11 against Panteras de Aguascalientes. In 35 games for Fuerza, he averaged 6.0 points and 3.0 rebounds per game.

In August 2016, Fuller re-signed with Fuerza Regia for the 2016–17 season. In 25 games, he averaged 3.6 points and 2.2 rebounds per game.

=== NLEX Road Warriors (2017) ===
On May 19, 2017, Fuller signed with the NLEX Road Warriors as an import for the 2017 PBA Governors' Cup. In 11 games for the Road Warriors, he averaged 22.6 points, 17.7 rebounds, 1.5 assists, 1.6 steals and 1.5 blocks per game.

=== Racing (2018) ===
In January 2018, Fuller joined Luxembourgian club Racing of the Total League. In 10 games, he averaged 30.0 points, 14.4 rebounds, 1.3 assists, 1.0 steals and 1.2 blocks per game.

=== Return to NLEX Road Warriors (2018) ===
In August 2018, Fuller re-joined the NLEX Road Warriors for the 2018 PBA Governors' Cup as an injury replacement for Olu Ashaolu.

=== Hapoel Galil Elyon (2018–2019) ===
On November 29, 2018, Fuller signed with the Israeli team Hapoel Galil Elyon of the Liga Leumit, replacing Stephen Maxwell. In 8 games played for Galil Elyon, he averaged 13.9 points, 5.3 rebounds and 1.5 steals per game.

=== Soles de Mexicali (2019) ===
On January 22, 2019, Fuller signed with Mexican team Soles de Mexicali for the Liga Americas. In three games, he averaged 6.7 points, 4.0 rebounds and 1.0 assists per game.

=== Return to Fuerza Regia (2019) ===
In February 2019, Fuller re-joined Fuerza Regia for the rest of the LNBP season. In 18 games, he averaged 6.7 points, 3.8 rebounds and 1.2 assists per game.

=== Blackwater Elite (2019) ===
In August 2019, Fuller joined Blackwater Elite of the Philippine Basketball Association for the East Asia Super League Terrific 12 and the PBA Governors' Cup. He was replaced by Marqus Blakely for the Terrific 12 tournament due to an ankle injury. He made his debut for the team in the Governors' Cup, but was later replaced again by Blakely due to not being 100%.

=== Fuerza Regia and Malvín (2019–2021) ===
Between November 2019 and November 2020, Fuller played for Fuerza Regia in the LNBP.

In March 2021, Fuller joined Malvín of the Liga Uruguaya de Básquetbol.

Between September and November 2021, Fuller once again played for Fuerza Regia.

=== TNT Tropang Giga (2021–2022) ===
On December 25, 2021, Fuller joined the TNT Tropang Giga for the 2021 PBA Governors' Cup as a replacement for the injured McKenzie Moore. He was released in March 2022 after sustaining a calf injury. He averaged 17.4 points, 16.4 rebounds, 2.2 assists, and 2.6 blocks per contest.

=== Seventh season with Fuerza Regia (2022) ===
In July 2022, Fuller re-joined Fuerza Regia for a seventh season.

=== Urunday Universitario and Gigantes de Guayana (2023) ===
In February 2023, Fuller joined Urunday Universitario of the Liga Uruguaya de Básquetbol (LUB).

In March 2023, Fuller joined Gigantes de Guayana of the Venezuelan SuperLiga.

=== Eighth season with Fuerza Regia (2023) ===
In August 2023, Fuller re-joined Fuerza Regia for an eighth season. He averaged 5.5 points and 3.1 rebounds in 38 games between August 19 and December 12.

=== Ancud (2024) ===
Between May 31 and June 23, 2024, Fuller played seven games for Asociación de Básquetbol Ancud of the Liga Nacional de Básquetbol de Chile.

=== Rain or Shine Elasto Painters (2024) ===
In July 2024, Fuller returned to the Philippines for the fifth time, this time playing as an import for the Rain or Shine Elasto Painters in the 2024 PBA Governors' Cup. In game two of the quarterfinals against Magnolia Hotshots, he sustained a corneal tear after being poked in the eye by Ian Sangalang. Fuller played through the series with the eye injury.

=== RANS Simba Bogor and Panteras de Aguascalientes (2025–2026) ===
In December 2024, Fuller signed with the RANS Simba Bogor of the Indonesian Basketball League (IBL) for the 2025 season. He was named to the All-IBL Second Team. In 31 games, he averaged 19.7 points, 9.1 rebounds and 1.5 assists per game.

In August 2025, Fuller had a two-game stint with Panteras de Aguascalientes of the LNBP.

Fuller re-joined the RANS Simba Bogor for the 2026 IBL season.

=== Return to Rain or Shine Elasto Painters (2026–present) ===
In June 2026, Fuller re-joined Rain or Shine Elasto Painters for the 2026 PBA Governors' Cup as part of the extended 2025–26 PBA season.

== Personal life ==
Fuller holds dual nationality with the United States and Mexico.
