= 2025–26 Phoenix Super LPG Fuel Masters season =

- Head coach: Willy Wilson (Philippine Cup); Charles Tiu
- General manager: Paolo Bugia; Sheila Briones (assistant)
- Governor: Raymond Zorrilla
- Owner: Phoenix Petroleum Philippines, Inc.

Philippine Cup results
- Record: 3–8 (27.3%)
- Place: 10th
- Playoff finish: Did not qualify

Commissioner's Cup results
- Record: 6–6 (50%)
- Place: 7th
- Playoff finish: Quarterfinalist (lost to Barangay Ginebra with twice-to-win disadvantage)

Governors' Cup results
- Record: 5–5 (50%)
- Place: 4th in group B
- Playoff finish: Quarterfinalist (lost to NLEX, 0–3)

Phoenix Super LPG Fuel Masters seasons

The 2025–26 Phoenix Super LPG Fuel Masters season was the 10th season of the franchise in the Philippine Basketball Association (PBA). Known as Phoenix Fuel Masters in the Philippine Cup.

== Key dates ==
- September 7, 2025: The PBA season 50 draft was held at the SM Mall of Asia Music Hall in Pasay.

== Draft picks ==
Round	Pick	Player	Position	Place of birth	College
1	8	Will Gozum	PF	Philippines	Benilde
2	14	Dave Ando	C	Philippines	UST
3	26	Harvey Pagsanjan	SG/PG	Philippines	EAC
4	37	Aldave Canoy	SG/SF	Philippines	CSAV
5	48	King Gurtiza	SG	Philippines	EAC

== Roster ==
Phoenix Super LPG Fuel Masters roster
Players
Coaches

Pos.	#	POB	Name	Height	Weight	DOB (YYYY–MM–DD)	From
F	0	(Philippines)	Will Gozum (R)	6 ft 6 in (1.98 m)	205 lb (93 kg)	1999–04–08	St. Benilde
F/C	1	(United States)	Kai Ballungay	6 ft 7 in (2.01 m)	215 lb (98 kg)	2001–11–16	Ateneo
F	3	(United States)	Jason Perkins	6 ft 4 in (1.93 m)	235 lb (107 kg)	1992–09–20	De La Salle
C	4	(United States)	Rafi Reavis	6 ft 8 in (2.03 m)	210 lb (95 kg)	1977–07–26	Coppin State
G	5	(Philippines)	Gian Mamuyac	6 ft 2 in (1.88 m)	165 lb (75 kg)	1999–03–05	Ateneo
F	7	(Philippines)	Sidney Onwubere (IN)	6 ft 4 in (1.93 m)		1993–08–01	Emilio Aguinaldo
C	9	(Philippines)	Justin Chua	6 ft 6 in (1.98 m)	245 lb (111 kg)	1989–07–13	Ateneo
F/C	10	(United States)	Marcellus Earlington (GI)	6 ft 6 in (1.98 m)	240 lb (109 kg)	2000–04–24	San Diego
G	13	(Italy)	JC Cullar	5 ft 10 in (1.78 m)		1997–01–26	St. Benilde
G/F	18	(Philippines)	Francis Escandor	6 ft 3 in (1.91 m)		1999–03–18	De La Salle
G	19	(Philippines)	Tyler Tio	6 ft 0 in (1.83 m)	170 lb (77 kg)	1998–04–05	Ateneo
G/F	20	(New Zealand)	Kenneth Tuffin	6 ft 4 in (1.93 m)		1997–05–05	Far Eastern
C	24	(Philippines)	Dave Ando (R)	6 ft 7 in (2.01 m)		1999–10–25	UST
G	25	(Philippines)	Ricci Rivero	6 ft 1 in (1.85 m)	146 lb (66 kg)	1998–05–25	Philippines
F	26	(Philippines)	Bryan Santos	6 ft 5 in (1.96 m)	209 lb (95 kg)	1997–05–26	UST
G	27	(Philippines)	JL delos Santos	5 ft 11 in (1.80 m)	176 lb (80 kg)	1999–09–12	José Rizal
G	39	(Philippines)	Tony Ynot (R)	6 ft 1 in (1.85 m)		2000–06–13	St. Benilde

Head coach

- (Philippines) Charles Tiu

Assistant coach(es)

- (Philippines) Jon Jacinto (1st assistant)
- (Philippines) Paolo Dizon
- (Philippines) Paolo Layug
- (Philippines) Ram Noriega
- (Philippines) TY Tang

Team manager

- (Philippines) Paolo Bugia
- (Philippines) Sheila Briones (assistant)

Legend

- (C) Team captain
- (CI) Commissioner's Cup Import
- (GI) Governors' Cup Import
- (EI) EASL Import
- (DP) Unsigned draft pick
- (FA) Free agent
- (IN) Inactive
- (S) Suspended
- (R) Rookie
- Injured

Roster

== Philippine Cup ==
=== Eliminations ===
==== Standings ====
Pos	Team	W	L	PCT	GB	Qualification
1	San Miguel Beermen	9	2	.818	—	Twice-to-beat in the quarterfinals
2	Rain or Shine Elasto Painters	8	3	.727 (Note: Head-to-head record: Rain or Shine 1–0 TNT)	1	Twice-to-beat in the quarterfinals
3	TNT Tropang 5G	8	3	.727	1	Twice-to-beat in the quarterfinals
4	Converge FiberXers	7	4	.636 (Note: Head-to-head record: Converge 1–0 Barangay Ginebra)	2	Twice-to-beat in the quarterfinals
5	Barangay Ginebra San Miguel	7	4	.636	2	Twice-to-win in the quarterfinals
6	Magnolia Chicken Timplados Hotshots	6	5	.545 (Note: Head-to-head quotient: Magnolia 1.09, Meralco 0.99, NLEX 0.93)	3	Twice-to-win in the quarterfinals
7	Meralco Bolts	6	5	.545	3	Twice-to-win in the quarterfinals
8	NLEX Road Warriors	6	5	.545	3	Twice-to-win in the quarterfinals
9	Titan Ultra Giant Risers	4	7	.364	5	
10	Phoenix Fuel Masters	3	8	.273	6	
11	Blackwater Bossing	1	10	.091 (Note: Head-to-head record: Blackwater 1–0 Terrafirma)	8	
12	Terrafirma Dyip	1	10	.091	8	

Source: PBA.ph
Rules for classification: 1) winning percentage; 2) head-to-head goal average (quotient); 3) head-to-head record; 4) overall quotient; 5) coin toss

==== Game log ====
2025–26 PBA Philippine Cup game log
Total: 3–8
October: 1–4

Game	Date	Opponent	Score	High points	High rebounds	High assists	Location Attendance	Record
1	October 10, 2025	TNT	L 78–93	Perkins, Tio (12)	Jason Perkins (8)	Evan Nelle (4)	Ynares Center Montalban	0–1
2	October 12, 2025	San Miguel	W 109–103	Ricci Rivero (16)	Kai Ballungay (8)	Evan Nelle (10)	Ynares Center Antipolo	1–1
3	October 22, 2025	NLEX	L 81–87	Ricci Rivero (22)	Kai Ballungay (11)	Tyler Tio (7)	Ninoy Aquino Stadium	1–2
4	October 25, 2025	Converge	L 114–128	Jason Perkins (27)	Kai Ballungay (8)	Evan Nelle (9)	Ynares Center Antipolo	1–3
5	October 31, 2025	Magnolia	L 80–83	Jason Perkins (19)	Bryan Santos (6)	Evan Nelle (6)	Ynares Center Antipolo	1–4

November: 1–2

Game	Date	Opponent	Score	High points	High rebounds	High assists	Location Attendance	Record
6	November 5, 2025	Rain or Shine	L 80–91	Jason Perkins (17)	Bryan Santos (11)	Tyler Tio (5)	Ninoy Aquino Stadium	1–5
7	November 12, 2025	Terrafirma	W 107–76	Kai Ballungay (19)	Kai Ballungay (12)	Tyler Tio (6)	Ynares Center Montalban	2–5
8	November 16, 2025	Barangay Ginebra	L 93–102	Ricci Rivero (28)	Jason Perkins (11)	Ricci Rivero (4)	Quadricentennial Pavilion	2–6

December: 1–2

Game	Date	Opponent	Score	High points	High rebounds	High assists	Location Attendance	Record
9	December 6, 2025	Blackwater	W 106–98	Jason Perkins (33)	Kenneth Tuffin (10)	Evan Nelle (5)	Ynares Center Antipolo	3–6
10	December 12, 2025	Meralco	L 78–88	Perkins, Rivero (13)	Garcia, Rivero, Santos, Tuffin (6)	Evan Nelle (3)	Ninoy Aquino Stadium	3–7
11	December 14, 2025	Titan Ultra	L 119–127	Jason Perkins (24)	Kenneth Tuffin (10)	Tyler Tio (10)	Ynares Center Antipolo	3–8

== Commissioner's Cup ==
=== Eliminations ===
==== Standings ====
Pos	Team	W	L	PCT	GB	Qualification
1	NLEX Road Warriors	10	2	.833	—	Twice-to-beat in the quarterfinals
2	Barangay Ginebra San Miguel	9	3	.750 (Note: Head-to-head record: Barangay Ginebra 1–0 Rain or Shine)	1	Twice-to-beat in the quarterfinals
3	Rain or Shine Elasto Painters	9	3	.750	1	Twice-to-beat in the quarterfinals
4	Meralco Bolts	8	4	.667	2	Twice-to-beat in the quarterfinals
5	Magnolia Chicken Timplados Hotshots	7	5	.583 (Note: Head-to-head record: Magnolia 1–0 San Miguel)	3	Twice-to-win in the quarterfinals
6	San Miguel Beermen	7	5	.583	3	Twice-to-win in the quarterfinals
7	Phoenix Super LPG Fuel Masters	6	6	.500 (Note: Head-to-head record: Phoenix Super LPG 1–0 TNT)	4	Twice-to-win in the quarterfinals
8	TNT Tropang 5G	6	6	.500	4	Twice-to-win in the quarterfinals
9	Converge FiberXers	5	7	.417	5	
10	Terrafirma Dyip	4	8	.333	6	
11	Macau Black Knights (G)	3	9	.250	7	
12	Titan Ultra Giant Risers	2	10	.167 (Note: Head-to-head record: Titan Ultra 1–0 Blackwater)	8	
13	Blackwater Bossing	2	10	.167	8	

Source: PBA.ph
Rules for classification: 1) winning percentage; 2) head-to-head goal average (quotient); 3) head-to-head record; 4) overall quotient; 5) coin toss
(G) Guests

==== Game log ====
2026 PBA Commissioner's Cup game log
Total: 6–6
March: 3–1

Game	Date	Opponent	Score	High points	High rebounds	High assists	Location Attendance	Record
1	March 13, 2026	Magnolia	W 101–98	James Dickey III (20)	James Dickey III (26)	James Dickey III (5)	Ninoy Aquino Stadium	1–0
2	March 15, 2026	Titan Ultra	W 109–76	Ricci Rivero (18)	James Dickey III (17)	Evan Nelle (8)	Ynares Center Montalban	2–0
3	March 21, 2026	Meralco	L 86–93	James Dickey III (28)	James Dickey III (21)	Evan Nelle (6)	Ynares Center Antipolo	2–1
4	March 25, 2026	Terrafirma	W 133–105	Ricci Rivero (40)	James Dickey III (13)	Ricci Rivero (8)	Ynares Center Antipolo	3–1

April: 2–3

Game	Date	Opponent	Score	High points	High rebounds	High assists	Location Attendance	Record
5	April 5, 2026	NLEX	L 102–120	Ricci Rivero (20)	James Dickey III (14)	Dickey III, Nelle, Tio (4)	Smart Araneta Coliseum	3–2
6	April 12, 2026	Barangay Ginebra	L 96–109	James Dickey III (21)	James Dickey III (21)	James Dickey III (9)	Smart Araneta Coliseum	3–3
7	April 17, 2026	Blackwater	W 125–108	James Dickey III (27)	James Dickey III (26)	Ricci Rivero (7)	Ynares Center Montalban	4–3
8	April 21, 2026	Rain or Shine	W 87–83	Jason Perkins (20)	James Dickey III (19)	Evan Nelle (8)	Ninoy Aquino Stadium	5–3
9	April 26, 2026	Converge	L 103–130	Ricci Rivero (26)	Ricci Rivero (6)	Evan Nelle (7)	Smart Araneta Coliseum	5–4

May: 1–2

Game	Date	Opponent	Score	High points	High rebounds	High assists	Location Attendance	Record
10	May 1, 2026	TNT	W 100–97 (OT)	Ricci Rivero (31)	Johnathan Williams (15)	Johnathan Williams (6)	Smart Araneta Coliseum; 12,711	6–4
11	May 6, 2026	Macau	L 98–105	Kenneth Tuffin (27)	Johnathan Williams (22)	Nelle, Williams (8)	Ninoy Aquino Stadium	6–5
12	May 9, 2026	San Miguel	L 104–116	Johnathan Williams (26)	Johnathan Williams (13)	JL delos Santos (5)	Ynares Center Antipolo	6–6

=== Playoffs ===
==== Bracket ====
Quarterfinals (Top 4 twice-to-beat)
1	NLEX	93	112
8	TNT	96	118
4	Meralco	89	105
5	Magnolia	95	102*
2	Barangay Ginebra	112
7	Phoenix Super LPG	81
3	Rain or Shine	113
6	San Miguel	104

Semifinals (Best-of-7)
8	TNT	4
4	Meralco	2
2	Barangay Ginebra	4
3	Rain or Shine	2

Finals (Best-of-7)
8	TNT	3
2	Barangay Ginebra	4

*Game went into overtime

==== Game log ====
2026 PBA Commissioner's Cup playoffs game log
Total: 0–1
Quarterfinals: 0–1

Game	Date	Opponent	Score	High points	High rebounds	High assists	Location Attendance	Series
1	May 15, 2026	Barangay Ginebra	L 81–112	Ricci Rivero (15)	Johnathan Williams (11)	Johnathan Williams (3)	Ynares Center Antipolo	0–1

== Governors' Cup ==
=== Eliminations ===
==== Standings ====
Pos	Team	W	L	PCT	GB	Qualification
1	Magnolia Chicken Timplados Hotshots	7	3	.700	—	Quarterfinals
2	Rain or Shine Elasto Painters	6	4	.600	1	Quarterfinals
3	Barangay Ginebra San Miguel	5	5	.500 (Note: Head-to-head quotient: Barangay Ginebra 1.08, Phoenix Super LPG 0.92)	2	Quarterfinals
4	Phoenix Super LPG Fuel Masters	5	5	.500	2	Quarterfinals
5	Meralco Bolts	4	6	.400	3	
6	Blackwater Bossing	3	7	.300	4	

Source: PBA.ph
Rules for classification: 1) winning percentage; 2) head-to-head quotient (goal average); 3) head-to-head record; 4) coin toss

==== Game log ====
2026 PBA Governors' Cup game log
Total: 5–5
July: 4–1

Game	Date	Opponent	Score	High points	High rebounds	High assists	Location Attendance	Record
1	July 11, 2026	Magnolia	W 98–86	B. J. Johnson (34)	B. J. Johnson (13)	delos Santos, Tio (5)	Ynares Center Montalban	1–0
2	July 15, 2026	Meralco	W 98–97	B. J. Johnson (26)	Ballungay, Tuffin (7)	Tyler Tio (8)	Smart Araneta Coliseum	2–0
3	July 19, 2026	Barangay Ginebra	W 81–78	B. J. Johnson (23)	B. J. Johnson (11)	Tyler Tio (4)	Smart Araneta Coliseum	3–0
4	July 21, 2026	Rain or Shine	L 98–105	B. J. Johnson (27)	B. J. Johnson (11)	delos Santos, Rivero (3)	Ynares Center Antipolo	3–1
5	July 28, 2026	Blackwater	W 102–93	Jason Perkins (25)	B. J. Johnson (12)	Ricci Rivero (9)	Ninoy Aquino Stadium	4–1

August: 0–2

Game	Date	Opponent	Score	High points	High rebounds	High assists	Location Attendance	Record
6	August 5, 2026	Blackwater	L 100–106	B. J. Johnson (45)	Kai Ballungay (9)	Ricci Rivero (8)	Smart Araneta Coliseum	4–2
7	August 12, 2026	Magnolia	L 101–115	B. J. Johnson (37)	Kai Ballungay (9)	Tyler Tio (4)	Ynares Center Antipolo	4–3

October: 1–2

Game	Date	Opponent	Score	High points	High rebounds	High assists	Location Attendance	Record
8	October 16, 2026	Meralco	W 105–101	Ricci Rivero (26)	Marcellus Earlington (14)	Ricci Rivero (7)	Ynares Center Antipolo	5–3
9	October 18, 2026	Barangay Ginebra	L 89–106	Marcellus Earlington (22)	Marcellus Earlington (9)	Gian Mamuyac (6)	Ynares Center Antipolo	5–4
10	October 23, 2026	Rain or Shine	L 103–133	Marcellus Earlington (20)	Bryan Santos (7)	Chua, delos Santos, Mamuyac, Tio (3)	Ynares Center Antipolo	5–5

=== Playoffs ===
==== Bracket ====
Quarterfinals (Best-of-5)
A1	NLEX	3
B4	Phoenix Super LPG	0
B2	Rain or Shine	1
A3	Converge	1
B1	Magnolia	0
A4	TNT	2
A2	San Miguel	0
B3	Barangay Ginebra	2

Semifinals (Best-of-5)
NLEX

Finals (Best-of-7)

==== Game log ====
2026 PBA Governors' Cup playoffs game log
Total: 0–3
Quarterfinals: 0–3

Game	Date	Opponent	Score	High points	High rebounds	High assists	Location Attendance	Series
1	October 25, 2026	NLEX	L 92–97	Ricci Rivero (24)	Marcellus Earlington (13)	Rivero, Tio (5)	Ynares Center Antipolo	0–1
2	October 28, 2026	NLEX	L 117–124	Marcellus Earlington (22)	Ballungay, Earlington (9)	Gian Mamuyac (8)	Ynares Center Antipolo	0–2
3	October 31, 2026	NLEX	L 89–137	Marcellus Earlington (19)	Marcellus Earlington (7)	Rivero, Tuffin (3)	Ninoy Aquino Stadium	0–3

== Transactions ==
=== Free agency ===
==== Signings ====
Player	Date signed	Contract amount	Contract length	Former team	Ref.
Francis Escandor	August 5, 2025	Not disclosed	2 years	Rain or Shine Elasto Painters	
Ricci Rivero	September 11, 2025	Not disclosed	Not disclosed	Re-signed	
Prince Caperal	September 19, 2025	Not disclosed	Not disclosed	Blackwater Bossing	
Yousef Taha	September 19, 2025	Not disclosed	Not disclosed	Abra Solid North Weavers (MPBL)	
RR Garcia	September 19, 2025	Not disclosed	1 year	Re-signed	
RJ Jazul	September 19, 2025	Not disclosed	1 year	Re-signed	
JL delos Santos	March 14, 2026	Not disclosed	Not disclosed	Converge FiberXers	
Justin Chua	June 27, 2026	Not disclosed	Rest of the season	TNT Tropang 5G	
Tyler Tio	July 9, 2026	Not disclosed	3 years	Re-signed	
Rafi Reavis	July 9, 2026	Not disclosed	Rest of the season	Converge FiberXers (Note: Rafi Reavis was signed last September 27, 2025 by Converge but he did not play any single game with the team.)	

==== Subtractions ====
Player	Number	Position	Reason	New team	Ref.
Simon Camacho	20, 24, 15	Power forward	Going to other leagues	Abra Solid North Weavers (MPBL)	
JC Cullar	26	Point guard	Released	San Juan Knights (MPBL)	
Raul Soyud	4	Center	Going to other leagues	San Juan Knights (MPBL)	
Raffy Verano	22	Small forward / Power forward	Free agent	Magnolia Chicken Timplados Hotshots	
RR Garcia	12, 8	Point guard	Released	Titan Ultra Giant Risers	
RJ Jazul	31, 13	Point guard / Shooting guard	Released		
Sean Manganti	2	Small forward	Released		
Yousef Taha	55	Center	Released		
Prince Caperal	23	Center / Power forward	Personal reasons		
Matthew Daves	12	Power forward / Center	Personal reasons		

=== Trades ===
==== Pre-season ====
September 2025
September 4, 2025	To Phoenix Evan Nelle (from NorthPort)	To Converge Larry Muyang (from Phoenix)	To NorthPort Jeo Ambohot (from Converge)
September 5, 2025	To Phoenix Bryan Santos; 2025 Converge first-round pick (No. 8)	To Converge 2025 Phoenix first-round pick (No. 2); 2027 (S51) Phoenix second-round pick
October 2025
October 1, 2025	To Phoenix James Kwekuteye	To Titan Ultra Ato Ular

==== Mid-season ====
February 2026
February 24, 2026	To Phoenix Super LPG Rights of Tony Ynot	To Converge James Kwekuteye
July 2026
July 6, 2026	To Phoenix Super LPG Sidney Onwubere	To NLEX Evan Nelle

==== Governors' Cup ====
July 2026
July 16, 2026	To Phoenix Super LPG Gian Mamuyac; 2029 (S53) Rain or Shine second-round pick	To Rain or Shine 2029 (S53) Phoenix Super LPG first-round pick

=== Recruited imports ===
Tournament	Name	Debuted	Last game	Record	Ref.
Commissioner's Cup	James Dickey III	March 13, 2026 (vs. Magnolia)	April 21, 2026 (vs. Rain or Shine)	5–3	
Commissioner's Cup	Johnathan Williams	May 1, 2026 (vs. TNT)	May 15, 2026 (vs. Barangay Ginebra)	1–3	
Governors' Cup	B. J. Johnson	July 11, 2026 (vs. Magnolia)	August 12, 2026 (vs. Magnolia)	4–3	
Governors' Cup	Marcellus Earlington	October 16, 2026 (vs. Meralco)	October 31, 2026 (vs. NLEX)	1–5	
