= 2023 PBA All-Star Weekend =

Team Scottie	Team Japeth
136	140
	1	2	3	4	Total
Team Scottie	28	37	39	32	136
Team Japeth	37	37	26	40	140
- Date: March 10–12, 2023
- Venue: City of Passi Arena, Passi, Iloilo
- MVP: Paul Lee
- Network: TV5, One Sports, PBA Rush, SMART Livestream and Radyo Pilipinas 2 918khz

The 2023 PBA All-Star Weekend was the annual all-star weekend of the Philippine Basketball Association (PBA)'s 2022–23 season. This was the first PBA All-Star weekend since 2019 as the event has not been held since due to the effects of the COVID-19 pandemic. Highlighting the weekend was the All-Star Game between Team Japeth and Team Scottie.

== Friday events ==
=== Obstacle Challenge ===
This edition was exclusive for big men (power forwards and centers).

Contestants
Pos.	Player	Team	Height	Weight
C/F	Christian Standhardinger	Barangay Ginebra San Miguel	6–8	220
F	Ato Ular	Blackwater Bossing	6–4	196
C	Justin Arana	Converge FiberXers	6–7	231
C	James Laput	Magnolia Chicken Timplados Hotshots	6–10	245
C	Raymond Almazan	Meralco Bolts	6–8	194
C/F	Brandon Ganuelas-Rosser	NLEX Road Warriors	6–6	220
C	JM Calma	NorthPort Batang Pier	6–6	193
C	Larry Muyang	Phoenix Super LPG Fuel Masters	6–6	220
C	Beau Belga	Rain or Shine Elasto Painters	6–6	235
C/F	Jeepy Faundo^{REP1}	San Miguel Beermen	6–6	
C	Joseph Gabayni	Terrafirma Dyip	6–5	
C/F	Dave Marcelo	TNT Tropang Giga	6–5	223
C	June Mar Fajardo^{INJ1}	San Miguel Beermen	6–10	268

Notes

- Gold represent current champion.

^INJ1 June Mar Fajardo was unable to participate due to a knee injury.
^REP1 Jeepy Faundo was selected as June Mar Fajardo's replacement.

First Round
Raymond Almazan (Meralco)	W
Larry Muyang (Phoenix)	L
Joseph Gabayni (Terrafirma)	L
Beau Belga (Rain or Shine)	W

Semifinals
Raymond Almazan (Meralco)	L
Beau Belga (Rain or Shine)	W

First Round
Christian Standhardinger (Barangay Ginebra)	W
Ato Ular (Blackwater)	L
Justin Arana (Converge)	L
Brandon Ganuelas-Rosser (NLEX)	W

Semifinals
Christian Standhardinger (Barangay Ginebra)	W
Brandon Ganuelas-Rosser (NLEX)	L

First Round
Jeepy Faundo (San Miguel)	W
James Laput (Magnolia)	L
JM Calma (NorthPort)	L
Dave Marcelo (TNT)	W

Semifinals
Jeepy Faundo (San Miguel)	L
Dave Marcelo (TNT)	W

Final round
Pos.	Player	Team	Time
C/F	Dave Marcelo	TNT Tropang Giga	25.38s
C/F	Christian Standhardinger	Barangay Ginebra San Miguel	27.47s
C	Beau Belga	Rain or Shine Elasto Painters	29.80s

=== Three-point Shootout ===
Contestants
Pos.	Player	Team	Height	Weight	First round	Final round
G	Paul Lee	Magnolia Chicken Timplados Hotshots	6–0	200	22	28
G/F	Marcio Lassiter	San Miguel Beermen	6–2	185	28	21
G	Juami Tiongson	Terrafirma Dyip	5–10	175	26	18
F	Arvin Tolentino	NorthPort Batang Pier	6–5	210	21	DNQ
G/F	Roger Pogoy	TNT Tropang Giga	6–2	180	21	DNQ
G/F	Jeremiah Gray^{REP2}	Barangay Ginebra San Miguel	6–5	205	18	DNQ
G	Aaron Black	Meralco Bolts	6–1	180	17	DNQ
G	Tyler Tio	Phoenix Super LPG Fuel Masters	6–0	170	17	DNQ
G	RK Ilagan^{REP3}	Blackwater Bossing	5–7	150	16	DNQ
G	Kevin Alas	NLEX Road Warriors	6–0	170	15	DNQ
G	Gian Mamuyac	Rain or Shine Elasto Painters	6–2	165	15	DNQ
G	Jerrick Balanza	Converge FiberXers	6–1	190	11	DNQ
G	LA Tenorio^{INJ2}	Barangay Ginebra San Miguel	5–9	151	DNP	
G	Baser Amer^{WD3}	Blackwater Bossing	6–0	170	DNP	

Notes

^INJ2 LA Tenorio was unable to participate after undergoing surgery for a sports hernia.
^REP2 Jeremiah Gray was selected as LA Tenorio's replacement.
^WD3 Baser Amer was unable to participate for undisclosed reasons.
^REP3 RK Ilagan was selected as Baser Amer's replacement.

=== Slam Dunk Competition ===
Contestants
Pos.	Player	Team	Height	Weight	First round	Final round
F	David Murrell	Converge FiberXers	6–4	195	92 (48+44)	92 (46+46)
F	Tyrus Hill	Blackwater Bossing	6–5	185	92 (42+50)	91 (41+50)
C/F	Brandon Ganuelas-Rosser	NLEX Road Warriors	6–6	220	89 (45+44)	DNQ
C/F	Chris Lalata	Phoenix Super LPG Fuel Masters	6–5	198	80 (43+37)	DNQ
G	Encho Serrano^{REP4}	Phoenix Super LPG Fuel Masters	6–0	176	DNP	
F	Jamie Malonzo^{INJ4}	Barangay Ginebra San Miguel	6–6	210	DNP	

^INJ4 Jamie Malonzo was unable to participate due to a shoulder injury.
^REP4 Encho Serrano was selected as Jamie Malonzo's replacement. However, Serrano was also unable to participate due to a sprained ankle.

=== Greats vs. Stalwarts ===
The Greats vs. Stalwarts format of the Blitz Game returned for the first time since 2016. Both teams were only composed of rookies, sophomores, and junior (third year) players. The game also introduced a four-point line and a three-point dunk.

==== Draft ====
2023 Blitz Game Draft
Pick	Player	Team
1	Brandon Ganuelas-Rosser	Stalwarts
2	Justin Arana	Greats
3	Calvin Oftana	Stalwarts
4	Ato Ular	Greats
5	Joshua Munzon	Stalwarts
6	Aaron Black	Greats
7	Encho Serrano	Stalwarts
8	Allyn Bulanadi	Greats
9	Anton Asistio	Stalwarts
10	Jerrick Ahanmisi	Greats
11	Tyler Tio	Stalwarts
12	Adrian Wong	Greats
13	Shaun Ildefonso	Stalwarts
14	Jerrick Balanza	Greats
15	Mike Nieto	Stalwarts
16	RK Ilagan	Greats
17	Matt Nieto	Stalwarts
18	Javi Gómez de Liaño	Greats
19	Aris Dionisio	Stalwarts
20	Isaac Go	Greats

==== Lineups ====
Stalwarts
Pos	Player	Team	R/S/J
Starters
G/F	Joshua Munzon	NorthPort Batang Pier	Sophomore
F	Shaun Ildefonso	Rain or Shine Elasto Painters	Rookie
C/F	Brandon Ganuelas-Rosser	NLEX Road Warriors	Rookie
G	Tyler Tio	Phoenix Super LPG Fuel Masters	Rookie
G	Encho Serrano	Phoenix Super LPG Fuel Masters	Rookie
Reserves
G	Anton Asistio	Rain or Shine Elasto Painters	Sophomore
F	Mike Nieto	Rain or Shine Elasto Painters	Sophomore
G	Matt Nieto	NLEX Road Warriors	Sophomore
F	Aris Dionisio	Magnolia Chicken Timplados Hotshots	Junior
F	Calvin Oftana^{WD5}	TNT Tropang Giga	Sophomore
G	Andrei Caracut^{REP5}	Rain or Shine Elasto Painters	Sophomore
Head coach: Caloy Garcia (Rain or Shine Elasto Painters)

Greats
Pos	Player	Team	R/S/J
Starters
G/F	Adrian Wong	Magnolia Chicken Timplados Hotshots	Junior
F	Javi Gómez de Liaño	Terrafirma Dyip	Rookie
C	Justin Arana	Converge FiberXers	Rookie
G	Aaron Black	Meralco Bolts	Junior
G	Jerrick Ahanmisi	Magnolia Chicken Timplados Hotshots	Sophomore
Reserves
F	Ato Ular	Blackwater Bossing	Rookie
G	Allyn Bulanadi	San Miguel Beermen	Sophomore
G	Jerrick Balanza	Converge FiberXers	Junior
G	RK Ilagan	Blackwater Bossing	Sophomore
C/F	Isaac Go^{INJ6}	Terrafirma Dyip	Sophomore
G	Alec Stockton^{REP6}	Converge FiberXers	Sophomore
G	Kent Salado^{REP7}	NorthPort Batang Pier	Junior
Head coach: Richard del Rosario (Barangay Ginebra San Miguel)

Notes

^WD5 Calvin Oftana was selected as a replacement to the All-Star Game and was subsequently removed from the Blitz Game.
^REP5 Andrei Caracut was selected as Calvin Oftana's replacement.
^INJ6 Isaac Go was unable to play due to a knee injury.
^REP6 Alec Stockton was selected as Isaac Go's replacement. However, Stockton was also unable to play due to a fractured nose.
^REP7 Kent Salado was selected as Alec Stockton's replacement.

==== Game ====
TV5 and PBA Rush

March 10
5:45 pm

Report

Stalwarts 138, Greats 158
Scoring by quarter: 39–32, 24–33, 34–39, 41–54
Pts: Serrano 40	Pts: Gómez de Liaño 30

City of Passi Arena, Passi, Iloilo

- Game MVP: Adrian Wong (Greats)

== Sunday events ==
=== Shooting Stars ===
The Shooting Stars returned for the first time since 2019 with a different format. There was one PBA courtside reporter, one government official, one sportswriter and a lucky fan. Team Red led by courtside reporter Apple David won the Shooting Stars.

=== All-Star Game ===
The format of the all-star game was patterned after the NBA's version, wherein fans voted up to 24 players and two coaches. The two players with the highest number of votes became the team captains and selected their teammates via draft. The game also introduced a four-point line and a three-point dunk, similar to the earlier Blitz Game.

==== Rosters ====
The voting started on January 25 and ended on February 15. The final results were announced on February 17, with Barangay Ginebra San Miguel teammates Japeth Aguilar and Scottie Thompson emerging as the top vote-getters and thus are the two opposing captains during the All-Star Game.

2023 PBA All-Stars
Pos	Player	Team	No. of selections
Players
C/F	Japeth Aguilar	Barangay Ginebra San Miguel	8
G	Scottie Thompson	Barangay Ginebra San Miguel	5
C	June Mar Fajardo	San Miguel Beermen	8
F	Jamie Malonzo	Barangay Ginebra San Miguel	1
C/F	Christian Standhardinger	Barangay Ginebra San Miguel	1
G/F	James Yap	Rain or Shine Elasto Painters	17
G	LA Tenorio	Barangay Ginebra San Miguel	10
F	Calvin Abueva	Magnolia Chicken Timplados Hotshots	8
G	Mark Barroca	Magnolia Chicken Timplados Hotshots	8
G	Stanley Pringle	Barangay Ginebra San Miguel	6
G/F	CJ Perez	San Miguel Beermen	1
G	Paul Lee	Magnolia Chicken Timplados Hotshots	9
G	Jayson Castro	TNT Tropang Giga	8
G	Gian Mamuyac	Rain or Shine Elasto Painters	1
G/F	Jeremiah Gray	Barangay Ginebra San Miguel	1
G	Terrence Romeo	San Miguel Beermen	6
G	Robert Bolick	NorthPort Batang Pier	1
G/F	Marcio Lassiter	San Miguel Beermen	7
F	Arvin Tolentino	NorthPort Batang Pier	1
G/F	Roger Pogoy	TNT Tropang Giga	4
G	Kevin Alas	NLEX Road Warriors	1
G	Chris Newsome	Meralco Bolts	1
G	John Pinto	Barangay Ginebra San Miguel	1
G	Mikey Williams	TNT Tropang Giga	1
Coaches
	Tim Cone	Barangay Ginebra San Miguel	9
	Yeng Guiao	Rain or Shine Elasto Painters	6

All-Star reserve
Pos	Player	Team	No. of selections (Note: If they actually played the All-Star Game)
G/F	Gabe Norwood	Rain or Shine Elasto Painters	11
G/F	Jeff Chan	NorthPort Batang Pier	7
F	Calvin Oftana	TNT Tropang Giga	1
G	Jio Jalalon	Magnolia Chicken Timplados Hotshots	4

The 25th up to the 28th-ranked vote-getters are named as the all-star reserve. They will replace the top 24 players in case a player misses the game due to injury. They are not officially All-Stars unless they actually play the game.

==== Draft ====
The PBA-All Star draft was held on February 20. A coin toss was first used to determine the head coaches for the teams, with Tim Cone going to Team Japeth and Yeng Guiao to Team Scottie. In another coin toss, Team Scottie won the flip and earned the right to draft first.

2023 All-Star Draft
Pick	Player	Team
1	Christian Standhardinger	Scottie
2	June Mar Fajardo	Japeth
3	CJ Perez	Scottie
4	Jamie Malonzo	Japeth
5	Calvin Abueva	Scottie
6	Chris Newsome	Japeth
7	Robert Bolick	Scottie
8	Roger Pogoy	Japeth
9	Arvin Tolentino	Scottie
10	LA Tenorio	Japeth
11	Kevin Alas	Scottie
12	Mikey Williams	Japeth
13	Jayson Castro	Scottie
14	Paul Lee	Japeth
15	Stanley Pringle	Scottie
16	Jeremiah Gray	Japeth
17	Marcio Lassiter	Scottie
18	Gian Mamuyac	Japeth
19	Mark Barroca	Scottie
20	John Pinto	Japeth
21	James Yap	Scottie
22	Terrence Romeo	Japeth

==== Lineups ====
All of the reserve players, except Jeff Chan, eventually played during the game as replacements to injured All-Stars, namely team captain Japeth Aguilar, LA Tenorio, Terrence Romeo, and Mikey Williams. Jeff Chan, despite being in the reserve team, begged off from the game and was replaced by Alex Cabagnot. This was Cabagnot's eighth All-Star appearance.

June Mar Fajardo was unable to play the game due to injury and was replaced by Raymond Almazan. This was Almazan's third All-Star appearance.

Reserve Gabe Norwood was also unable to play the game due to injury and was replaced by Arwind Santos. This was Santos's twelfth All-Star appearance.

Team Scottie
Pos	Player	Team
Starters
F	Calvin Abueva	Magnolia Chicken Timplados Hotshots
G/F	James Yap	Rain or Shine Elasto Painters
C/F	Christian Standhardinger	Barangay Ginebra San Miguel
G	Scottie Thompson	Barangay Ginebra San Miguel
G	Robert Bolick	NorthPort Batang Pier
Reserves
G/F	CJ Perez	San Miguel Beermen
F	Arvin Tolentino	NorthPort Batang Pier
G	Kevin Alas	NLEX Road Warriors
G	Jayson Castro	TNT Tropang Giga
G	Stanley Pringle	Barangay Ginebra San Miguel
G/F	Marcio Lassiter	San Miguel Beermen
G	Mark Barroca	Magnolia Chicken Timplados Hotshots
Head coach: Yeng Guiao (Rain or Shine Elasto Painters)

Team Japeth
Pos	Player	Team
Starters
F	Jamie Malonzo	Barangay Ginebra San Miguel
G/F	Roger Pogoy	TNT Tropang Giga
C	Raymond Almazan	Meralco Bolts
G	Paul Lee	Magnolia Chicken Timplados Hotshots
G	Chris Newsome	Meralco Bolts
Reserves
F	Calvin Oftana	TNT Tropang Giga
G	Jio Jalalon	Magnolia Chicken Timplados Hotshots
G/F	Jeremiah Gray	Barangay Ginebra San Miguel
G	Gian Mamuyac	Rain or Shine Elasto Painters
G	John Pinto	Barangay Ginebra San Miguel
G	Alex Cabagnot	Terrafirma Dyip
F	Arwind Santos	NorthPort Batang Pier
Head coach: Tim Cone (Barangay Ginebra San Miguel)

==== Game ====
Prior to the game, Team Japeth won the traditional dance-off.

TV5 and PBA Rush

March 12
6:00 pm

Team Scottie 136, Team Japeth 140
Scoring by quarter: 28–37, 37–37, 39–26, 32–40
Pts: Alas 35	Pts: Lee 32

City of Passi Arena, Passi, Iloilo

- PBA All-Star Game Most Valuable Player Award: Paul Lee (Team Japeth)
