= 2023–24 Phoenix Fuel Masters season =

- Head coach: Jamike Jarin
- General Manager: Paolo Bugia
- Owner(s): Phoenix Petroleum Philippines, Inc.

Commissioner's Cup results
- Record: 8–3 (72.7%)
- Place: 4th
- Playoff finish: Semifinalist (lost to Magnolia, 1–3)

Philippine Cup results
- Record: 3–8 (27.3%)
- Place: 11th
- Playoff finish: Did not qualify

Phoenix Fuel Masters seasons

The 2023–24 Phoenix Fuel Masters season was the 8th season of the franchise in the Philippine Basketball Association (PBA). Formerly known as Phoenix Super LPG Fuel Masters in the Commissioner's Cup, the team revert to their former name Phoenix Fuel Masters starting the Philippine Cup.

== Key dates ==
- September 17: The PBA season 48 draft was held at the Market! Market! in Taguig.

== Draft picks ==
| Round | Pick | Player | Position | Place of birth | College |
|---|---|---|---|---|---|
| 1 | 6 | Kenneth Tuffin | F | New Zealand | FEU |
| 2 | 16 | Raffy Verano | F | USA | Ateneo |
| 2 | 17 | Ricci Rivero | G | Philippines | UP |
| 3 | 28 | Matthew Daves | F | Canada | Ateneo |
| 4 | 39 | John Lloyd Clemente | G | Philippines | NU |
| 5 | 50 | Daniel Atienza | G | Philippines | CEU |
| 6 | 59 | Joe Gómez de Liaño | G | Philippines | UP |
| 7 | 66 | Theo Flores | G/F | Philippines | NU |

== Roster ==
2023–24 Phoenix Fuel Masters roster
Players
Coaches

| Pos. | # | POB | Name | Height | Weight | DOB (YYYY–MM–DD) | From |
|---|---|---|---|---|---|---|---|
| C | 1 | (Philippines) | Larry Muyang | 6 ft 6 in (1.98 m) | 220 lb (100 kg) | 1995–06–04 | Letran |
| F | 2 | (United States) | Sean Manganti | 6 ft 5 in (1.96 m) | | 1994–04–18 | Adamson |
| F | 3 | (United States) | Jason Perkins | 6 ft 4 in (1.93 m) | 235 lb (107 kg) | 1992–09–20 | De La Salle |
| C | 4 | (Philippines) | Raul Soyud | 6 ft 6 in (1.98 m) | 222 lb (101 kg) | 1991–01–14 | Philippines |
| F | 6 | (Philippines) | Chris Lalata | 6 ft 5 in (1.96 m) | 198 lb (90 kg) | 1995–01–09 | Olivarez |
| F | 7 | (Philippines) | Javee Mocon | 6 ft 3 in (1.91 m) | 189 lb (86 kg) | 1995–04–07 | San Beda |
| G | 8 | (Philippines) | RR Garcia | 5 ft 11 in (1.80 m) | 165 lb (75 kg) | 1990–01–12 | Far Eastern |
| G | 9 | (Philippines) | Jjay Alejandro | 6 ft 0 in (1.83 m) | 165 lb (75 kg) | 1995–04–13 | National-U |
| F/C | 12 | (Canada) | Matthew Daves (R) | 6 ft 4 in (1.93 m) | 235 lb (107 kg) | 1999–02–12 | Ateneo |
| G | 13 | (Philippines) | RJ Jazul (C) | 5 ft 11 in (1.80 m) | 170 lb (77 kg) | 1986–04–11 | Letran |
| G | 16 | (Philippines) | Kent Salado | 5 ft 9 in (1.75 m) | | 1994–11–10 | Arellano |
| G | 19 | (Philippines) | Tyler Tio | 6 ft 0 in (1.83 m) | 170 lb (77 kg) | 1998–04–05 | Ateneo |
| G/F | 20 | (New Zealand) | Kenneth Tuffin (R) | 6 ft 4 in (1.93 m) | | 1997–05–05 | Far Eastern |
| F | 22 | (United States) | Raffy Verano (R) | 6 ft 3 in (1.91 m) | 200 lb (91 kg) | 1997–11–16 | Ateneo |
| F | 24 | (Philippines) | Simon Camacho | 6 ft 5 in (1.96 m) | | | Adamson |
| G | 25 | (Philippines) | Ricci Rivero (R) | 6 ft 1 in (1.85 m) | 146 lb (66 kg) | 1998–05–25 | Philippines |

Head coach

- (Philippines) Jamike Jarin

Assistant coach(es)

- (Philippines) Jon Jacinto (1st assistant)
- (Philippines) Christien dela Cruz
- (Philippines) Paolo Dizon
- (Philippines) Ian Anthony Sangco
- (Philippines) Willy Wilson

Team manager

- (Philippines) Paolo Bugia

Legend

- (C) Team captain
- (CI) Commissioner's Cup Import
- (GI) Governors' Cup Import
- (EI) EASL Import
- (DP) Unsigned draft pick
- (FA) Free agent
- (IN) Inactive
- (S) Suspended
- (R) Rookie
- Injured

Roster

== Preseason ==
=== PBA on Tour ===
==== Game log ====
2023 PBA on Tour game log
Total: 3–8
May: 2–0

| Game | Date | Opponent | Score | High points | High rebounds | High assists | Location Attendance | Record |
|---|---|---|---|---|---|---|---|---|
| 1 | May 24 | San Miguel | W 106–101 | Simon Camacho (15) | Larry Muyang (12) | Jjay Alejandro (9) | Ynares Sports Arena | 1–0 |
| 2 | May 28 | Meralco | W 100–93 | Raul Soyud (25) | Raul Soyud (13) | Tyler Tio (6) | Ynares Sports Arena | 2–0 |

June: 1–4

| Game | Date | Opponent | Score | High points | High rebounds | High assists | Location Attendance | Record |
|---|---|---|---|---|---|---|---|---|
| 3 | June 2 | Rain or Shine | L 104–113 | Raul Soyud (24) | Raul Soyud (13) | RJ Jazul (9) | Ynares Center | 2–1 |
| 4 | June 9 | NLEX | L 95–112 | Larry Muyang (21) | Larry Muyang (12) | Jjay Alejandro (7) | Ynares Sports Arena | 2–2 |
| 5 | June 14 | Barangay Ginebra | L 89–95 | RJ Jazul (18) | Javee Mocon (9) | RJ Jazul (6) | Ynares Sports Arena | 2–3 |
| 6 | June 23 | Terrafirma | W 104–92 | Reden Celda (19) | Lalata, Muyang (8) | Jjay Alejandro (8) | Ynares Sports Arena | 3–3 |
| 7 | June 25 | Blackwater | L 90–92 | Sean Manganti (18) | Larry Muyang (8) | Reden Celda (6) | Ynares Sports Arena | 3–4 |

July: 0–4

| Game | Date | Opponent | Score | High points | High rebounds | High assists | Location Attendance | Record |
|---|---|---|---|---|---|---|---|---|
| 8 | July 7 | Converge | L 90–104 | Sean Manganti (15) | Sean Manganti (8) | Tyler Tio (6) | Ynares Sports Arena | 3–5 |
| 9 | July 14 | NorthPort | L 86–105 | Raul Soyud (16) | Larry Muyang (12) | RR Garcia (6) | Ynares Sports Arena | 3–6 |
| 10 | July 19 | TNT | L 88–96 | Sean Manganti (18) | Camacho, Lalata (13) | Javee Mocon (5) | Ynares Sports Arena | 3–7 |
| 11 | July 23 | Magnolia | L 91–111 | Jjay Alejandro (24) | Larry Muyang (10) | Garcia, Mocon (6) | FilOil EcoOil Centre | 3–8 |

=== Converge Pocket Tournament ===
==== Game log ====
2023 PBA Converge Pocket Tournament game log
Total: 0–3
October: 0–3

| Game | Date | Opponent | Score | High points | High rebounds | High assists | Location Attendance | Record |
|---|---|---|---|---|---|---|---|---|
| 1 | October 13 | Rain or Shine | L 105–109 | Johnathan Williams (25) | Johnathan Williams (11) | Tyler Tio (9) | Gatorade Hoops Center | 0–1 |
| 2 | October 15 | Blackwater | L 96–103 | Ricci Rivero (28) | Johnathan Williams (14) | Ken Tuffin (4) | Gatorade Hoops Center | 0–2 |
| 3 | October 17 | Converge | L 93–97 | Javee Mocon (13) | Johnathan Williams (8) | Alejandro, Mocon, Williams (4) | Gatorade Hoops Center | 0–3 |

== Commissioner's Cup ==
=== Eliminations ===
==== Standings ====
| Pos | Team | W | L | PCT | GB | Qualification |
|---|---|---|---|---|---|---|
| 1 | Magnolia Chicken Timplados Hotshots | 9 | 2 | .818 | — | Twice-to-beat in quarterfinals |
| 2 | San Miguel Beermen | 8 | 3 | .727 (Note: Head-to-head quotient: San Miguel 1.17, Barangay Ginebra 0.99, Phoenix Super LPG 0.98, Meralco 0.89) | 1 | Twice-to-beat in quarterfinals |
| 3 | Barangay Ginebra San Miguel | 8 | 3 | .727 | 1 | Twice-to-beat in quarterfinals |
| 4 | Phoenix Super LPG Fuel Masters | 8 | 3 | .727 | 1 | Twice-to-beat in quarterfinals |
| 5 | Meralco Bolts | 8 | 3 | .727 | 1 | Twice-to-win in quarterfinals |
| 6 | NorthPort Batang Pier | 6 | 5 | .545 (Note: Head-to-head record: NorthPort 1–0 Rain or Shine) | 3 | Twice-to-win in quarterfinals |
| 7 | Rain or Shine Elasto Painters | 6 | 5 | .545 | 3 | Twice-to-win in quarterfinals |
| 8 | TNT Tropang Giga | 5 | 6 | .455 | 4 | Twice-to-win in quarterfinals |
| 9 | NLEX Road Warriors | 4 | 7 | .364 | 5 | |
| 10 | Terrafirma Dyip | 2 | 9 | .182 | 7 | |
| 11 | Blackwater Bossing | 1 | 10 | .091 (Note: Head-to-head record: Blackwater 1–0 Converge) | 8 | |
| 12 | Converge FiberXers | 1 | 10 | .091 | 8 | |

Source: PBA.ph
Rules for classification: 1) winning percentage; 2) if two teams are tied, head-to-head record; if three or more teams are tied, head-to-head goal average (quotient); if tied for 8th, one-game playoff; 3) overall quotient; 4) coin toss

==== Game log ====
2023–24 PBA Commissioner's Cup game log
Total: 8–3
November: 4–1

| Game | Date | Opponent | Score | High points | High rebounds | High assists | Location Attendance | Record |
|---|---|---|---|---|---|---|---|---|
| 1 | November 10 | NLEX | W 113–101 | Johnathan Williams (26) | Johnathan Williams (13) | Tyler Tio (8) | Smart Araneta Coliseum | 1–0 |
| 2 | November 12 | Magnolia | L 92–107 | Johnathan Williams (26) | Johnathan Williams (13) | Johnathan Williams (5) | Ynares Center | 1–1 |
| 3 | November 18 | Rain or Shine | W 99–98 | Johnathan Williams (29) | Johnathan Williams (18) | Johnathan Williams (7) | Ynares Center | 2–1 |
| 4 | November 24 | Blackwater | W 111–106 | Jason Perkins (23) | Johnathan Williams (12) | Johnathan Williams (8) | Smart Araneta Coliseum | 3–1 |
| 5 | November 29 | Terrafirma | W 103–84 | Johnathan Williams (29) | Johnathan Williams (13) | Johnathan Williams (4) | Smart Araneta Coliseum | 4–1 |

December: 3–1

| Game | Date | Opponent | Score | High points | High rebounds | High assists | Location Attendance | Record |
|---|---|---|---|---|---|---|---|---|
| 6 | December 2 | Converge | W 99–98 | Johnathan Williams (27) | Johnathan Williams (16) | Johnathan Williams (6) | PhilSports Arena | 5–1 |
| 7 | December 9 | Barangay Ginebra | W 82–77 | Johnathan Williams (24) | Johnathan Williams (23) | Tyler Tio (7) | FPJ Arena | 6–1 |
| 8 | December 20 | NorthPort | W 113–104 | Johnathan Williams (38) | Johnathan Williams (19) | Johnathan Williams (9) | Smart Araneta Coliseum | 7–1 |
| 9 | December 25 | San Miguel | L 96–117 | Johnathan Williams (37) | Johnathan Williams (16) | Tyler Tio (4) | Smart Araneta Coliseum | 7–2 |

January: 1–1

| Game | Date | Opponent | Score | High points | High rebounds | High assists | Location Attendance | Record |
|---|---|---|---|---|---|---|---|---|
| 10 | January 10 | Meralco | W 93–83 | Jason Perkins (22) | Johnathan Williams (15) | Johnathan Williams (5) | Smart Araneta Coliseum | 8–2 |
| 11 | January 14 | TNT | L 96–116 | Johnathan Williams (21) | Johnathan Williams (14) | Johnathan Williams (6) | PhilSports Arena | 8–3 |

=== Playoffs ===
==== Bracket ====
Quarterfinals (Top 4 twice-to-beat)
1 | Magnolia | 109
8 | TNT | 94
4 | Phoenix Super LPG | 107 | 88
5 | Meralco | 116*** | 84
2 | San Miguel | 127
7 | Rain or Shine | 122
3 | Barangay Ginebra | 106
6 | NorthPort | 93

Semifinals (Best-of-5)
1 | Magnolia | 3
4 | Phoenix Super LPG | 1
2 | San Miguel | 3
3 | Barangay Ginebra | 0

Finals (Best-of-7)
1 | Magnolia | 2
2 | San Miguel | 4

***Game went into triple overtime

==== Game log ====
2023–24 PBA Commissioner's Cup playoffs game log
Total: 2–4
Quarterfinals: 1–1

| Game | Date | Opponent | Score | High points | High rebounds | High assists | Location Attendance | Series |
|---|---|---|---|---|---|---|---|---|
| 1 | January 17 | Meralco | L 107–116 (3OT) | Johnathan Williams (24) | Johnathan Williams (24) | Johnathan Williams (6) | PhilSports Arena | 0–1 |
| 2 | January 21 | Meralco | W 88–84 | Johnathan Williams (21) | Johnathan Williams (16) | Javee Mocon (4) | SM Mall of Asia Arena | 1–1 |

Semifinals: 1–3

| Game | Date | Opponent | Score | High points | High rebounds | High assists | Location Attendance | Series |
|---|---|---|---|---|---|---|---|---|
| 1 | January 24 | Magnolia | L 79–82 | Jason Perkins (25) | Johnathan Williams (18) | Johnathan Williams (7) | Smart Araneta Coliseum | 0–1 |
| 2 | January 26 | Magnolia | L 78–82 | Johnathan Williams (27) | Johnathan Williams (16) | Johnathan Williams (5) | SM Mall of Asia Arena | 0–2 |
| 3 | January 28 | Magnolia | W 103–85 | Johnathan Williams (19) | Johnathan Williams (15) | Johnathan Williams (4) | SM Mall of Asia Arena | 1–2 |
| 4 | January 31 | Magnolia | L 79–89 | Johnathan Williams (17) | Johnathan Williams (17) | Johnathan Williams (5) | SM Mall of Asia Arena | 1–3 |

== Philippine Cup ==
=== Eliminations ===
==== Standings ====
| Pos | Team | W | L | PCT | GB | Qualification |
|---|---|---|---|---|---|---|
| 1 | San Miguel Beermen | 10 | 1 | .909 | — | Twice-to-beat in the quarterfinals |
| 2 | Barangay Ginebra San Miguel | 7 | 4 | .636 | 3 | Twice-to-beat in the quarterfinals |
| 3 | Meralco Bolts | 6 | 5 | .545 (Note: Head-to-head quotient: Meralco 1.06, TNT 1.03, Rain or Shine 1.01, NLEX 0.99, Magnolia 0.90) | 4 | Best-of-three quarterfinals |
| 4 | TNT Tropang Giga | 6 | 5 | .545 | 4 | Best-of-three quarterfinals |
| 5 | Rain or Shine Elasto Painters | 6 | 5 | .545 | 4 | Best-of-three quarterfinals |
| 6 | NLEX Road Warriors | 6 | 5 | .545 | 4 | Best-of-three quarterfinals |
| 7 | Magnolia Chicken Timplados Hotshots | 6 | 5 | .545 | 4 | Twice-to-win in the quarterfinals |
| 8 | Terrafirma Dyip | 5 | 6 | .455 (Note: Eighth seed playoff: Terrafirma 104–96 NorthPort) | 5 | Twice-to-win in the quarterfinals |
| 9 | NorthPort Batang Pier | 5 | 6 | .455 | 5 | |
| 10 | Blackwater Bossing | 4 | 7 | .364 | 6 | |
| 11 | Phoenix Fuel Masters | 3 | 8 | .273 | 7 | |
| 12 | Converge FiberXers | 2 | 9 | .182 | 8 | |

Source: PBA.ph
Rules for classification: 1) winning percentage; 2) if two teams are tied, head-to-head record; if three or more teams are tied, head-to-head goal average (quotient); if tied for 8th, one-game playoff; 3) overall quotient; 4) coin toss

==== Game log ====
2024 PBA Philippine Cup game log
Total: 3–8
March: 1–4

| Game | Date | Opponent | Score | High points | High rebounds | High assists | Location Attendance | Record |
|---|---|---|---|---|---|---|---|---|
| 1 | March 8 | NorthPort | L 120–124 | Jason Perkins (28) | Jason Perkins (7) | Rivero, Tio, Tuffin (4) | Smart Araneta Coliseum | 0–1 |
| 2 | March 10 | Barangay Ginebra | L 92–102 | Jason Perkins (14) | Javee Mocon (9) | Garcia, Manganti, Mocon (4) | Smart Araneta Coliseum | 0–2 |
| 3 | March 13 | Terrafirma | W 94–78 | RR Garcia (20) | Kenneth Tuffin (9) | RR Garcia (10) | PhilSports Arena | 1–2 |
| 4 | March 17 | Rain or Shine | L 85–100 | Ricci Rivero (16) | Javee Mocon (12) | Garcia, Rivero (4) | Ynares Center | 1–3 |
All-Star Break
| 5 | March 31 | San Miguel | L 102–116 | Alejandro, Daves (13) | Jason Perkins (11) | Jjay Alejandro (6) | Smart Araneta Coliseum | 1–4 |

April: 2–3

| Game | Date | Opponent | Score | High points | High rebounds | High assists | Location Attendance | Record |
|---|---|---|---|---|---|---|---|---|
| 6 | April 12 | Converge | W 113–107 | Jason Perkins (26) | Jason Perkins (13) | Jjay Alejandro (8) | PhilSports Arena | 2–4 |
| 7 | April 14 | Magnolia | L 93–107 | RJ Jazul (21) | Jason Perkins (5) | Kent Salado (6) | Ninoy Aquino Stadium | 2–5 |
| 8 | April 20 | NLEX | W 112–77 | RJ Jazul (19) | Jason Perkins (8) | Kent Salado (8) | Ynares Sports Arena | 3–5 |
| 9 | April 24 | TNT | L 101–108 | Jason Perkins (26) | Jason Perkins (10) | Kent Salado (7) | Ninoy Aquino Stadium | 3–6 |
| 10 | April 26 | Meralco | L 76–82 | Kenneth Tuffin (14) | Mocon, Salado (8) | Jason Perkins (4) | Smart Araneta Coliseum | 3–7 |

May: 0–1

| Game | Date | Opponent | Score | High points | High rebounds | High assists | Location Attendance | Record |
|---|---|---|---|---|---|---|---|---|
| 11 | May 4 | Blackwater | L 83–102 | Jason Perkins (22) | Kenneth Tuffin (10) | Jjay Alejandro (5) | Ynares Sports Arena | 3–8 |

== Transactions ==
=== Free agency ===
==== Signings ====
| Player | Date signed | Contract amount | Contract length | Former team |
|---|---|---|---|---|
| RR Garcia | April 5, 2023 | Not disclosed | 1 year | Re-signed |
| Larry Muyang | April 5, 2023 | Not disclosed | 2 years | Re-signed |
| Chris Lalata | May 23, 2023 | Not disclosed | 1 year | Re-signed |
| Tyler Tio | July 3, 2023 | Not disclosed | 3 years | Re-signed |
| Jjay Alejandro | December 16, 2023 | Not disclosed | 2 years | Re-signed |
| Jason Perkins | December 19, 2023 | ₱420,000 per month (max. contract) | 3 years | Re-signed |
| RR Garcia | March 5, 2024 | Not disclosed | 1 year | Re-signed |
| RJ Jazul | March 6, 2024 | Not disclosed | 1 year | Re-signed |
| Kent Salado | March 16, 2024 | Not disclosed | Not disclosed | NLEX Road Warriors |

==== Subtractions ====
| Player | Number | Position | Reason | New team |
|---|---|---|---|---|
| Encho Serrano | 18 | Point guard / Shooting guard | End of contract; did not agree to term extension | Pampanga Giant Lanterns (MPBL) |
| Kurt Lojera | 3 | Shooting guard | End of contract; did not agree to term extension | Siomai King (PSL) |

=== Trades ===
==== Pre-season ====
May
| May 30, 2023 | To Phoenix Reden Celda Tzaddy Rangel | To NLEX Ben Adamos |

=== Recruited imports ===
| Tournament | Name | Debuted | Last game | Record |
|---|---|---|---|---|
| Commissioner's Cup | Johnathan Williams | November 10, 2023 (vs. NLEX) | January 31, 2024 (vs. Magnolia) | 10–7 |

== Awards ==
| Recipient | Award | Date awarded |
|---|---|---|
| Johnathan Williams | 2023–24 PBA Commissioner's Cup Best Import of the Conference | February 9, 2024 |
Honors
| Jason Perkins | 2023–24 PBA Mythical Second Team | August 18, 2024 |
