= Tyler Tio =

Filipino basketball player (born 1998)

No. 19 – Phoenix Super LPG Fuel Masters
- Position: Point guard
- League: PBA

Personal information
- Born: April 5, 1998 (age 28) San Fernando, La Union, Philippines
- Listed height: 6 ft 0 in (1.83 m)
- Listed weight: 170 lb (77 kg)

Career information
- High school: Xavier School (San Juan)
- College: Ateneo
- PBA draft: 2022: 2nd round, 14th overall pick
- Drafted by: Phoenix Super LPG Fuel Masters
- Playing career: 2022–present

Career history
- 2022–present: Phoenix Fuel Masters / Phoenix Super LPG Fuel Masters

Career highlights
- PBA All-Star (2024); PBA All-Rookie Team (2023); 3× UAAP champion (2017–2019)

Christian Tyler Chan Tio (born April 5, 1998) is a Filipino-Canadian professional basketball player for the Phoenix Super LPG Fuel Masters of the Philippine Basketball Association (PBA).

== Early life and high school career ==
Tio was born the youngest of three siblings. His parents were former Filipino citizens before acquiring Canadian citizenship. His father was in the poultry business before retiring while his mother owns a travel agency. His first sport was swimming before focusing on basketball as his father and older brother Tristan influenced him to take up the sport.

Tio played for Xavier School's basketball varsity team from grade school all the way to high school. In 2013, Tio was one of the 10 players who stood out during the Jr. NBA Philippines camp. He also participated in the 2015 and 2016 editions of the SLAM Rising Stars Classic. In 2016, he was selected to play in the NBTC All-Star Game.

Tio earned college offers from University of the Philippines, De La Salle, San Beda, and Ateneo. He committed to Ateneo on March 1, 2016. He chose Ateneo as they offered his preferred course, Management Economics, and his siblings had also studied in Ateneo.

== College career ==
Before making his UAAP debut, Tio had to switch citizenships, as he was a Canadian citizen at the time, and Ateneo already had a foreign student-athlete in Chibueze Ikeh using up the one allotted spot for foreign student-athletes. He could not get a Filipino passport in time and as a result, he was not included on Ateneo's roster for Season 79. He was still able to play for Ateneo during this time during the 2016 and 2017 Filoil Flying V Preseason tournaments. On May 30, 2017, he was granted Filipino citizenship, allowing him to finally suit up for Ateneo.

Tio made his Ateneo debut during Season 80 against the UP Fighting Maroons. After missing Ateneo's first game of the season due to a left ankle sprain, he scored 14 points in his debut on a perfect 6-of-6 shooting clip in just merely 11 minutes of action off the bench. He was able to win a UAAP championship in his rookie year.

In Season 81, Tio stepped into a starting role against UP as Matt Nieto had the flu and a finger injury. In that game, he had 12 points and five assists. He then led Ateneo to three straight wins, with the highlight being his 16 points against the UE Red Warriors. Ateneo beat UP in that year's Finals. The following season, he went back to a bench role, and was supplanted in the rotation by SJ Belangel. Still, they had no losses that season, as Ateneo went on to win its third straight title.

In a Season 84 win over the FEU Tamaraws, Tio scored all 17 of his points in the third quarter, and added four rebounds and two assists. He then notched his college career-high of 20 points to go with three assists in a win over the UST Growling Tigers. In a rematch with FEU, he had 14 points, four rebounds, three assists, and one steal as Ateneo won its 40th straight game. Before the start of the UAAP Finals, he declared for the 2022 PBA draft. In the Finals, after a scoreless Game 1, he bounced back the following game with 14 points. In what would be his final game for Ateneo, he only had two points, as UP defeated Ateneo and won its first title in 36 years. His averages in his final season were 7.9 points, 1.9 rebounds, and 1.4 assists. In his four UAAP seasons, he only started six games.

== Professional career ==
=== Phoenix Super LPG Fuel Masters / Phoenix Fuel Masters (2022–present) ===
Tio was selected 14th overall pick by the Phoenix Super LPG Fuel Masters in 2022 PBA draft. In his PBA debut, he started against Chris Ross and the San Miguel Beermen, and even though Phoenix lost that game, he still had an impressive stat line of 17 points on five of five shots from three, two rebounds, and an assist. In an overtime loss to the NLEX Road Warriors, he had 18 points and went 3-of-5 from three. He also had to use his teammate Sean Anthony's shoes in that game, as his broke in the fourth quarter. In a loss to the NorthPort Batang Pier, he 15 points, three boards, and an assist of his own. They were eliminated from Philippine Cup playoff contention with a loss to Barangay Ginebra.

At the end of the Philippine Cup, he led the league in three-point percentage at 49.1 percent after making 27 of his 55 attempts. He was also second among rookies behind Ato Ular in scoring at 11.7 points per game. In a Commissioner's Cup game against the Bay Area Dragons, he had 21 points and made five triples. Phoenix finally got its first Commissioner's Cup win against NLEX, in which he had a career-high 26 points and seven assists. For this performance, he was awarded Player of the Week honors.

He then scored 17 points on 8-of-11 shooting with seven assists in an upset win over Ginebra. They got their third straight win that conference against the Meralco Bolts in which he had 14 points. Phoenix was able to extend the streak to five wins before they lost to the Converge FiberXers. Against the Magnolia Hotshots in a playoff game for a semis spot, he had 18 points, but Magnolia eliminated them.

In a Governors' Cup win over Converge, he contributed 16 points. During All-Star Weekend, he participated in the Three-Point Shootout and in the Rookies-Sophomores-Juniors game. In the Governors' Cup playoffs, they were eliminated by the TNT Tropang Giga.

On July 3, 2023, Tio signed a new three-year contract with the team.

== PBA career statistics ==
Legend
GP	Games played	MPG	Minutes per game	FG%	Field-goal percentage
3FG%	3-point field-goal percentage	4P%	4-point field-goal percentage	FT%	Free-throw percentage
RPG	Rebounds per game	APG	Assists per game	SPG	Steals per game
BPG	Blocks per game	PPG	Points per game	127	Career high

As of the end of 2025–26 season

=== Season-by-season averages ===
Year	Team	GP	MPG	FG%	3P%	4P%	FT%	RPG	APG	SPG	BPG	PPG
2022–23	Phoenix Super LPG	36	29.7	.422	.371	—	.743	2.3	2.8	.7	.0	11.7
2023–24	Phoenix Super LPG / Phoenix	18	26.2	.431	.400	—	.828	1.9	2.3	.5	.1	9.9
2024–25	Phoenix	33	26.6	.432	.320	.333	.839	2.2	3.9	.5	.1	10.1
2025–26	Phoenix / Phoenix Super LPG	35	24.2	.414	.321	.000	.620	1.4	3.6	.3	.0	9.2
Career		122	26.8	.424	.353	.111	.753	2.0	3.3	.5	.1	10.3

== National team career ==
Due to Tio's Canadian citizenship, he was not able to be a member of Batang Gilas. In non-FIBA tournaments, he participated in the 2018 Jones Cup as a member of Ateneo. Ateneo finished 4th in that tournament.

== Personal life ==
Tio has a girlfriend, Andrea Lim. Ever since he was still in college, he has owned a small stake in Amare La Cucina, an Italian restaurant in Kapitolyo, Pasig, which his brother, cousins, and agent PJ Pilares own. He also endorses Adidas Philippines sportswear.
