= 2024–25 Phoenix Fuel Masters season =

- Head coach: Jamike Jarin
- General manager: Paolo Bugia; Sheila Briones (assistant)
- Owner: Phoenix Petroleum Philippines, Inc.

Governors' Cup results
- Record: 1–9 (10%)
- Place: 6th in Group B
- Playoff finish: Did not qualify

Commissioner's Cup results
- Record: 3–9 (25%)
- Place: 12th
- Playoff finish: Did not qualify

Philippine Cup results
- Record: 4–7 (36.4%)
- Place: 9th
- Playoff finish: Did not qualify

Phoenix Fuel Masters seasons

The 2024–25 Phoenix Fuel Masters season was the 9th season of the franchise in the Philippine Basketball Association (PBA).

== Key dates ==
- July 14: The PBA season 49 draft was held at the Glorietta Activity Center in Makati.

== Draft picks ==
Round	Pick	Player	Position	Place of birth	College
1	4	Kai Ballungay	C/F	USA	Ateneo
3	28	CJ Payawal	F	USA	UE
4	38	Chino Mosqueda	G	Philippines	NU
5	45	Patrick Feliciano	G	Philippines	Diliman

== Roster ==
2024–25 Phoenix Fuel Masters roster
Players
Coaches

Pos.	#	POB	Name	Height	Weight	DOB (YYYY–MM–DD)	From
F	2	(United States)	Sean Manganti	6 ft 5 in (1.96 m)		1994–04–18	Adamson
F	3	(United States)	Jason Perkins	6 ft 4 in (1.93 m)	235 lb (107 kg)	1992–09–20	De La Salle
C	4	(Philippines)	Raul Soyud	6 ft 6 in (1.98 m)	222 lb (101 kg)	1991–01–14	Philippines
F	5	(Philippines)	Ato Ular	6 ft 4 in (1.93 m)	196 lb (89 kg)	1995–05–04	Letran
G	8	(Philippines)	RR Garcia	5 ft 11 in (1.80 m)	165 lb (75 kg)	1990–01–12	Far Eastern
G	9	(Philippines)	Jjay Alejandro	6 ft 0 in (1.83 m)	165 lb (75 kg)	1995–04–13	National-U
F/C	10	(United States)	Kai Ballungay (R)	6 ft 7 in (2.01 m)	215 lb (98 kg)	2001–11–16	Ateneo
F/C	12	(Canada)	Matthew Daves	6 ft 4 in (1.93 m)	235 lb (107 kg)	1999–02–12	Ateneo
G	13	(Philippines)	RJ Jazul (C)	5 ft 11 in (1.80 m)	170 lb (77 kg)	1986–04–11	Letran
F	15	(Philippines)	Simon Camacho	6 ft 5 in (1.96 m)			Adamson
G	18	(Philippines)	Kent Salado	5 ft 9 in (1.75 m)		1994–11–10	Arellano
G	19	(Philippines)	Tyler Tio	6 ft 0 in (1.83 m)	170 lb (77 kg)	1998–04–05	Ateneo
G/F	20	(New Zealand)	Kenneth Tuffin	6 ft 4 in (1.93 m)		1997–05–05	Far Eastern
F	22	(United States)	Raffy Verano	6 ft 3 in (1.91 m)	200 lb (91 kg)	1997–11–16	Ateneo
G	25	(Philippines)	Ricci Rivero	6 ft 1 in (1.85 m)	146 lb (66 kg)	1998–05–25	Philippines
G	26	(Italy)	JC Cullar (R)	5 ft 10 in (1.78 m)		1997–01–26	St. Benilde

Head coach

- (Philippines) Jamike Jarin

Assistant coach(es)

- (Philippines) Jon Jacinto (1st assistant)
- (Philippines) Christien dela Cruz
- (Philippines) Paolo Dizon
- (Philippines) Ian Anthony Sangco
- (Philippines) Willy Wilson

Team manager

- (Philippines) Paolo Bugia
- (Philippines) Sheila Briones (assistant)

Legend

- (C) Team captain
- (CI) Commissioner's Cup Import
- (GI) Governors' Cup Import
- (EI) EASL Import
- (DP) Unsigned draft pick
- (FA) Free agent
- (IN) Inactive
- (S) Suspended
- (R) Rookie
- Injured

Roster

== Governors' Cup ==
=== Eliminations ===
==== Group B Standings ====
Pos	Team	W	L	PCT	GB	Qualification
1	Rain or Shine Elasto Painters	7	3	.700	—	Quarterfinals
2	San Miguel Beermen	6	4	.600 (Note: Head-to-head record: San Miguel 1–1 Barangay Ginebra (San Miguel 1.23, Barangay Ginebra 0.82))	1	Quarterfinals
3	Barangay Ginebra San Miguel	6	4	.600	1	Quarterfinals
4	NLEX Road Warriors	5	5	.500 (Note: Head-to-head record: NLEX 1–1 Blackwater (NLEX 1.03, Blackwater 0.97))	2	Quarterfinals
5	Blackwater Bossing	5	5	.500	2	
6	Phoenix Fuel Masters	1	9	.100	6	

Source: PBA.ph
Rules for classification: 1) winning percentage; 2) if two teams are tied, head-to-head record, if three or more teams are tied, head-to-head goal average (quotient); 3) overall quotient; 4) coin toss

==== Game log ====
2024 PBA Governors' Cup game log
Total: 1–9
August: 0–3

Game	Date	Opponent	Score	High points	High rebounds	High assists	Location Attendance	Record
1	August 21	San Miguel	L 107–111	Jason Perkins (18)	Jayveous McKinnis (15)	Rivero, Tio (3)	Smart Araneta Coliseum	0–1
2	August 25	NLEX	L 95–100	RR Garcia (18)	Jayveous McKinnis (14)	Jason Perkins (5)	Smart Araneta Coliseum	0–2
3	August 30	Rain or Shine	L 99–116	Alejandro, Jazul (12)	Javee Mocon (9)	Tyler Tio (7)	Ninoy Aquino Stadium	0–3

September: 1–6

Game	Date	Opponent	Score	High points	High rebounds	High assists	Location Attendance	Record
4	September 3	Blackwater	L 111–123	Brandone Francis (45)	Javee Mocon (12)	Brandone Francis (8)	Smart Araneta Coliseum	0–4
5	September 6	Barangay Ginebra	L 101–110	Brandone Francis (33)	Javee Mocon (9)	Francis, Mocon, Tio (4)	Ninoy Aquino Stadium	0–5
6	September 10	Rain or Shine	L 107–122	Brandone Francis (31)	Jason Perkins (10)	Jason Perkins (3)	Ninoy Aquino Stadium	0–6
7	September 13	San Miguel	L 127–139	Brandone Francis (48)	Jason Perkins (7)	Tyler Tio (6)	Smart Araneta Coliseum	0–7
8	September 15	Blackwater	W 119–114	Brandone Francis (23)	Brandone Francis (10)	Brandone Francis (9)	Smart Araneta Coliseum	1–7
9	September 18	Barangay Ginebra	L 96–112	Manganti, Perkins (18)	Ballungay, Francis (6)	Tyler Tio (8)	Ninoy Aquino Stadium	1–8
10	September 20	NLEX	L 79–104	Sean Manganti (13)	Jason Perkins (7)	Ricci Rivero (3)	Ninoy Aquino Stadium	1–9

== Commissioner's Cup ==
=== Eliminations ===
==== Standings ====
Pos	Team	W	L	PCT	GB	Qualification
1	NorthPort Batang Pier	9	3	.750	—	Twice-to-beat in the quarterfinals
2	TNT Tropang Giga	8	4	.667 (Note: Head-to-head quotient: TNT 1.04, Converge 1.03, Barangay Ginebra 0.94)	1	Twice-to-beat in the quarterfinals
3	Converge FiberXers	8	4	.667	1	Best-of-three quarterfinals
4	Barangay Ginebra San Miguel	8	4	.667	1	Best-of-three quarterfinals
5	Meralco Bolts	7	5	.583 (Note: Head-to-head quotient: Meralco 1.08, Rain or Shine 1.04, Eastern 0.88)	2	Best-of-three quarterfinals
6	Rain or Shine Elasto Painters	7	5	.583	2	Best-of-three quarterfinals
7	Eastern (G)	7	5	.583	2	Twice-to-win in the quarterfinals
8	Magnolia Chicken Timplados Hotshots	6	6	.500 (Note: Eighth seed playoff: Magnolia 112–81 NLEX)	3	Twice-to-win in the quarterfinals
9	NLEX Road Warriors	6	6	.500	3	
10	San Miguel Beermen	5	7	.417	4	
11	Blackwater Bossing	3	9	.250 (Note: Head-to-head record: Blackwater 1–0 Phoenix)	6	
12	Phoenix Fuel Masters	3	9	.250	6	
13	Terrafirma Dyip	1	11	.083	8	

Source: PBA.ph
Rules for classification: 1) winning percentage; 2) if two teams are tied, head-to-head record; if three or more teams are tied, head-to-head goal average (quotient); if tied for 8th, one-game playoff; 3) overall quotient; 4) coin toss
(G) Guests

==== Game log ====
2024–25 PBA Commissioner's Cup game log
Total: 3–9
November: 0–2

Game	Date	Opponent	Score	High points	High rebounds	High assists	Location Attendance	Record
1	November 27, 2024	Eastern	L 87–102	Donovan Smith (33)	Donovan Smith (11)	Perkins, Rivero (4)	PhilSports Arena	0–1
2	November 29, 2024	Meralco	L 109–111	Donovan Smith (33)	Donovan Smith (9)	Tyler Tio (8)	Ninoy Aquino Stadium	0–2

December: 1–3

Game	Date	Opponent	Score	High points	High rebounds	High assists	Location Attendance	Record
3	December 3, 2024	San Miguel	L 104–107	Donovan Smith (37)	Donovan Smith (15)	Tyler Tio (6)	Ninoy Aquino Stadium	0–3
4	December 13, 2024	Barangay Ginebra	L 72–94	Donovan Smith (20)	Donovan Smith (15)	Ricci Rivero (4)	Ninoy Aquino Stadium	0–4
5	December 17, 2024	NorthPort	W 115–109	Donovan Smith (32)	Donovan Smith (14)	Tyler Tio (9)	Ninoy Aquino Stadium	1–4
6	December 19, 2024	Converge	L 105–116	Donovan Smith (30)	Donovan Smith (18)	Tyler Tio (5)	Ninoy Aquino Stadium	1–5

January: 2–4

Game	Date	Opponent	Score	High points	High rebounds	High assists	Location Attendance	Record
7	January 7, 2025	Terrafirma	W 122–108	Donovan Smith (37)	Kenneth Tuffin (9)	Jazul, Rivero (5)	PhilSports Arena	2–5
8	January 11, 2025	Rain or Shine	W 93–91	Donovan Smith (22)	RR Garcia (11)	Tyler Tio (4)	Ninoy Aquino Stadium	3–5
9	January 16, 2025	Magnolia	L 104–110	Donovan Smith (40)	Donovan Smith (6)	Tyler Tio (5)	PhilSports Arena	3–6
10	January 19, 2025	NLEX	L 94–108	Donovan Smith (36)	Donovan Smith (14)	Donovan Smith (3)	Ynares Center	3–7
11	January 21, 2025	Blackwater	L 92–100	Donovan Smith (32)	Donovan Smith (9)	Donovan Smith (5)	Ynares Center	3–8
12	January 24, 2025	TNT	L 70–106	Tyler Tio (14)	Donovan Smith (15)	RJ Jazul (4)	Ynares Center	3–9

== Philippine Cup ==
=== Eliminations ===
==== Standings ====
Pos	Team	W	L	PCT	GB	Qualification
1	San Miguel Beermen	8	3	.727 (Note: Head-to-head quotient: San Miguel 1.06, NLEX 1.01, Magnolia 0.97, Barangay Ginebra 0.96)	—	Twice-to-beat in the quarterfinals
2	NLEX Road Warriors	8	3	.727	—	Twice-to-beat in the quarterfinals
3	Magnolia Chicken Timplados Hotshots	8	3	.727	—	Twice-to-beat in the quarterfinals
4	Barangay Ginebra San Miguel	8	3	.727	—	Twice-to-beat in the quarterfinals
5	Converge FiberXers	7	4	.636	1	Twice-to-win in the quarterfinals
6	TNT Tropang 5G	6	5	.545 (Note: Head-to-head quotient: TNT 1.13, Rain or Shine 1.02, Meralco 0.87)	2	Twice-to-win in the quarterfinals
7	Rain or Shine Elasto Painters	6	5	.545	2	Twice-to-win in the quarterfinals
8	Meralco Bolts	6	5	.545	2	Twice-to-win in the quarterfinals
9	Phoenix Fuel Masters	4	7	.364	4	
10	Blackwater Bossing	2	9	.182 (Note: Head-to-head record: Blackwater 1–0 NorthPort)	6	
11	NorthPort Batang Pier	2	9	.182	6	
12	Terrafirma Dyip	1	10	.091	7	

Source: PBA.ph
Rules for classification: 1) winning percentage; 2) if two teams are tied, head-to-head record; if three or more teams are tied, head-to-head goal average (quotient); if tied for 8th, one-game playoff; 3) overall quotient; 4) coin toss

==== Game log ====
2025 PBA Philippine Cup game log
Total: 4–7
April: 1–3

Game	Date	Opponent	Score	High points	High rebounds	High assists	Location Attendance	Record
1	April 4	Terrafirma	L 87–95	Kai Ballungay (30)	Kai Ballungay (15)	Ricci Rivero (6)	Ninoy Aquino Stadium	0–1
2	April 6	Converge	L 83–92	Kai Ballungay (15)	Kai Ballungay (12)	Tyler Tio (3)	Ninoy Aquino Stadium	0–2
3	April 13	Meralco	W 109–97	Tyler Tio (22)	Kai Ballungay (8)	Tyler Tio (6)	Ninoy Aquino Stadium	1–2
4	April 26	Magnolia	L 99–118	Kai Ballungay (25)	Kai Ballungay (15)	Garcia, Perkins (5)	Zamboanga City Coliseum	1–3

May: 1–3

Game	Date	Opponent	Score	High points	High rebounds	High assists	Location Attendance	Record
5	May 2	TNT	W 95–81	Jason Perkins (27)	Simon Camacho (7)	Tyler Tio (4)	Ynares Center II	2–3
6	May 11	San Miguel	L 92–111	Kai Ballungay (23)	Jason Perkins (9)	Tyler Tio (7)	Ninoy Aquino Stadium	2–4
7	May 16	Barangay Ginebra	L 112–119	Jason Perkins (28)	Kai Ballungay (7)	Jason Perkins (5)	PhilSports Arena	2–5
8	May 28	Rain or Shine	L 99–109	Kenneth Tuffin (15)	Kai Ballungay (11)	Garcia, Perkins, Tio (4)	PhilSports Arena	2–6

June: 2–1

Game	Date	Opponent	Score	High points	High rebounds	High assists	Location Attendance	Record
9	June 1	NLEX	L 95–105	Jason Perkins (28)	Kai Ballungay (10)	Perkins, Tuffin (3)	Smart Araneta Coliseum	2–7
10	June 4	NorthPort	W 118–107	Jason Perkins (26)	Kai Ballungay (9)	Tio, Tuffin (5)	PhilSports Arena	3–7
11	June 13	Blackwater	W 124–109	Jason Perkins (39)	Balunggay, Tuffin (14)	Tyler Tio (9)	Ninoy Aquino Stadium	4–7

== Transactions ==
=== Free agency ===
==== Signings ====
Player	Date signed	Contract amount	Contract length	Former team	Ref.
JC Cullar	May 1, 2025	Not disclosed	Not disclosed	Nueva Ecija Rice Vanguards (MPBL)	

=== Trades ===
==== Governors' Cup ====
September
September 11, 2024	To Phoenix Ato Ular 2026 NLEX second-round pick	To NLEX Javee Mocon

=== Recruited imports ===
Tournament	Name	Debuted	Last game	Record	Ref.
Governors' Cup	Jayveous McKinnis	August 21, 2024 (vs. San Miguel)	August 25, 2024 (vs. NLEX)	0–2	
Governors' Cup	Brandone Francis	September 3, 2024 (vs. Blackwater)	September 20, 2024 (vs. NLEX)	1–6	
Commissioner's Cup	Donovan Smith	November 27, 2024 (vs. NLEX)	January 24, 2025 (vs. TNT)	3–9	

== Awards ==
Recipient	Honors	Date awarded	Reference
Kai Ballungay	2024–25 PBA All-Rookie Team	October 13, 2025	
