= 2015–16 Phoenix Fuel Masters season =

- Head coach: Koy Banal (Commissioner's Cup); Ariel Vanguardia (Governors' Cup)
- Owner(s): Phoenix Petroleum Philippines, Inc.

Commissioner's Cup results
- Record: 3–8 (27.3%)
- Place: 11th
- Playoff finish: Did not qualify

Governors' Cup results
- Record: 5–6 (45.5%)
- Place: 8th
- Playoff finish: Quarterfinalists (lost to TNT in one game)

Phoenix Fuel Masters seasons

The 2015–16 Phoenix Fuel Masters season was the 1st season of the franchise in the Philippine Basketball Association (PBA).

== Key Dates ==
- January 28: The PBA Board of Governors unanimously approved the sale of Barako Bull to Phoenix Petroleum in a special meeting Wednesday at the league's headquarters in Libis, Quezon City.

== Roster ==
2015–16 Phoenix Fuel Masters roster
Players
Coaches

Pos.	#	POB	Name	Height	Weight	DOB (YYYY–MM–DD)	From
G	0	(United States)	Simon Enciso	5 ft 11 in (1.80 m)	185 lb (84 kg)	1991–02–12	Notre Dame de Namur
G	1	(Philippines)	Ronjay Buenafe	6 ft 1 in (1.85 m)	190 lb (86 kg)	1983–05–27	Emilio Aguinaldo
G	2	(United States)	Josh Urbiztondo	6 ft 0 in (1.83 m)	185 lb (84 kg)	1983–02–27	Fresno Pacific
G/F	3	(Philippines)	Cyrus Baguio	6 ft 2 in (1.88 m)	180 lb (82 kg)	1980–08–19	UST
F/C	6	(Canada)	Norbert Torres	6 ft 6 in (1.98 m)	250 lb (113 kg)	1990–01–12	De La Salle
F	7	(Philippines)	JC Intal	6 ft 4 in (1.93 m)	185 lb (84 kg)	1983–11–18	Ateneo
G/F	8	(Philippines)	John Wilson	6 ft 2 in (1.88 m)	185 lb (84 kg)	1987–01–18	José Rizal
G	9	(Philippines)	Mark Cruz	5 ft 6 in (1.68 m)	120 lb (54 kg)	1992–07–27	Letran
F	10	(Philippines)	Marvin Hayes	6 ft 2 in (1.88 m)	190 lb (86 kg)	1986–05–13	José Rizal
F/C	12	(Philippines)	Prince Caperal (IN)	6 ft 7 in (2.01 m)	230 lb (104 kg)	1993–06–12	Arellano
F	16	(Philippines)	Mark Borboran	6 ft 4 in (1.93 m)	185 lb (84 kg)	1984–11–20	UE
G	26	(Philippines)	Chico Lañete	6 ft 0 in (1.83 m)	180 lb (82 kg)	1979–08–01	Lyceum
F	28	(United States)	Willy Wilson (C)	6 ft 3 in (1.91 m)	215 lb (98 kg)	1980–01–30	De La Salle
F/C	34	(Philippines)	Michael Miranda	6 ft 6 in (1.98 m)	210 lb (95 kg)	1990–12–12	San Sebastian
C	88	(Australia)	Mick Pennisi	6 ft 9 in (2.06 m)	235 lb (107 kg)	1975–03–13	Eastern Michigan

Head coach

- (Philippines) Ariel Vanguardia

Assistant coach(es)

- (Philippines) Justino Pinat (1st Assistant)
- (United States) Nic Belasco
- (Philippines) Caesar Polhen

Team manager

- (Philippines) Paolo Bugia

Legend

- (C) Team captain
- (CI) Commissioner's Cup Import
- (GI) Governors' Cup Import
- (EI) EASL Import
- (DP) Unsigned draft pick
- (FA) Free agent
- (IN) Inactive
- (S) Suspended
- (R) Rookie
- Injured

Roster

== Commissioner's Cup ==
=== Eliminations ===
==== Standings ====
Pos	Team	W	L	PCT	GB	Qualification
1	San Miguel Beermen	8	3	.727 (Note: Head-to-head record: San Miguel 1–0 Meralco)	—	Twice-to-beat in the quarterfinals
2	Meralco Bolts	8	3	.727	—	Twice-to-beat in the quarterfinals
3	Alaska Aces	7	4	.636 (Note: Head-to-head quotient: Alaska 1.18, Barangay Ginebra 1.03, Rain or Shine 0.84)	1	Best-of-three quarterfinals
4	Barangay Ginebra San Miguel	7	4	.636	1	Best-of-three quarterfinals
5	Rain or Shine Elasto Painters	7	4	.636	1	Best-of-three quarterfinals
6	Tropang TNT	6	5	.545	2	Best-of-three quarterfinals
7	NLEX Road Warriors	5	6	.455 (Note: Head-to-head record: NLEX 1–0 Star)	3	Twice-to-win in the quarterfinals
8	Star Hotshots	5	6	.455	3	Twice-to-win in the quarterfinals
9	Mahindra Enforcer	4	7	.364	4	
10	Blackwater Elite	3	8	.273 (Note: Head-to-head quotient: Blackwater 1.04, Phoenix 0.99, GlobalPort 0.98)	5	
11	Phoenix Fuel Masters	3	8	.273	5	
12	GlobalPort Batang Pier	3	8	.273	5	

Source: PBA.ph

== Governors' Cup ==
=== Eliminations ===
==== Standings ====
Pos	Team	W	L	PCT	GB	Qualification
1	TNT KaTropa	10	1	.909	—	Twice-to-beat in the quarterfinals
2	San Miguel Beermen	8	3	.727 (Note: Head-to-head record: San Miguel 1–0 Barangay Ginebra)	2	Twice-to-beat in the quarterfinals
3	Barangay Ginebra San Miguel	8	3	.727	2	Twice-to-beat in the quarterfinals
4	Meralco Bolts	6	5	.545 (Note: Head-to-head quotient: Meralco 1.039, Mahindra 1.017, Alaska 0.950; fourth seed playoff: Meralco 104–99 Mahindra)	4	Twice-to-beat in the quarterfinals
5	Mahindra Enforcer	6	5	.545	4	Twice-to-win in the quarterfinals
6	Alaska Aces	6	5	.545	4	Twice-to-win in the quarterfinals
7	NLEX Road Warriors	5	6	.455 (Note: Head-to-head quotient: NLEX 1.04, Rain or Shine 1.03, Phoenix 0.93; eighth seed playoff: Phoenix 105–94 Rain or Shine)	5	Twice-to-win in the quarterfinals
8	Phoenix Fuel Masters	5	6	.455	5	Twice-to-win in the quarterfinals
9	Rain or Shine Elasto Painters	5	6	.455	5	
10	GlobalPort Batang Pier	4	7	.364	6	
11	Star Hotshots	2	9	.182	8	
12	Blackwater Elite	1	10	.091	9	

Source: PBA.ph

== Transactions ==
=== Trades ===
==== Commissioner's Cup ====
March 11, 2016	To Phoenix Doug Kramer	To GlobalPort Mick Pennisi

May 4, 2016	To Phoenix Simon Enciso; Mark Borboran	To NLEX Emman Monfort; Marnel Baracael; 2018 second-round pick

May 11, 2016	To Phoenix Mark Cruz (from Star); Norbert Torres (from Star); Jonathan Uyloan (from Star via GlobalPort)	To Star RR Garcia (from Phoenix); Rodney Brondial(from Phoenix); Keith Jensen (from GlobalPort)	To GlobalPort Yousef Taha (from Star); Ronald Pascual (from Star)

May 31, 2016	To NLEX James Forrester	To Phoenix John Wilson

==== Governors' Cup ====
July 12, 2016	To Phoenix Ronjay Buenafe	To Meralco Jonathan Uyloan

July 13, 2016	To Phoenix Cyrus Baguio	To Alaska 2017 2nd Round Pick; 2018 second-round pick

July 13, 2016	To Phoenix John Wilson	To NLEX James Forrester

=== Recruited imports ===
Tournament	Name	Debuted	Last game	Record
Commissioner's Cup	Kenny Adeleke	February 17 (vs. NLEX)	February 21 (vs. Meralco)	1–1
Commissioner's Cup	Kevinn Pinkney	February 27 (vs. TNT)	April 10 (vs. San Miguel)	2–7
Governors' Cup	(United States) Marcus Simmons	July 15 (vs. Meralco)	July 23 (vs. Rain or Shine)	0–3
Governors' Cup	(United States) Eugene Phelps	July 31 (vs. GlobalPort)	September 24 (vs. TNT)	6–4
Governors' Cup	(South Korea) Lee Gwan-hee*	July 15 (vs. Meralco)	September 24 (vs. TNT)	6–7
