= Javee Mocon =

Filipino basketball player

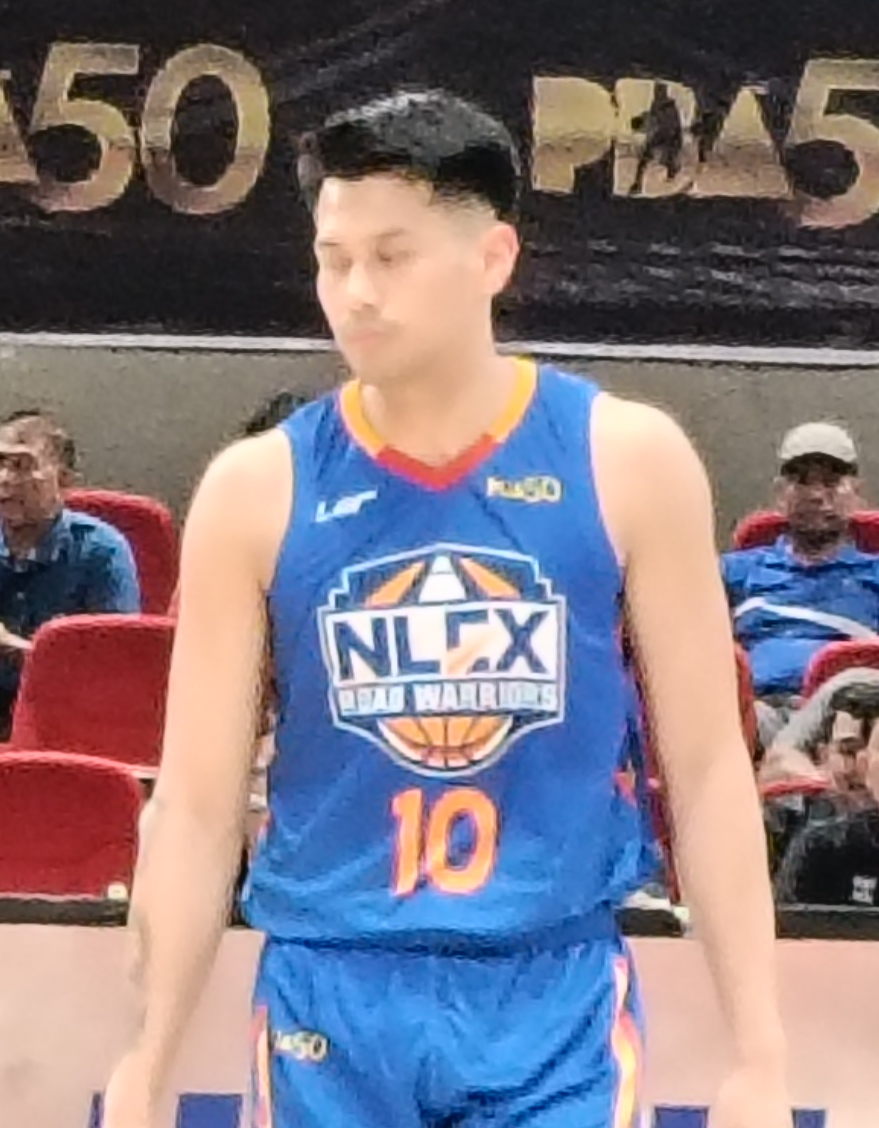
- Mocon with the NLEX Road Warriors in 2025

No. 10 – Meralco Bolts
- Position: Small forward
- League: PBA

Personal information
- Born: April 7, 1995 (age 31) Guagua, Pampanga, Philippines
- Listed height: 6 ft 3 in (1.91 m)
- Listed weight: 189 lb (86 kg)

Career information
- High school: San Beda-Rizal (Taytay, Rizal)
- College: San Beda (2014–2018)
- PBA draft: 2018: 1st round, 6th overall pick
- Drafted by: Rain or Shine Elasto Painters
- Playing career: 2019–present

Career history
- 2019–2022: Rain or Shine Elasto Painters
- 2022–2024: Phoenix Super LPG Fuel Masters / Phoenix Fuel Masters
- 2024–2025: NLEX Road Warriors
- 2026–present: Meralco Bolts

Career highlights
- PBA All-Rookie Team (2019); 4× NCAA Philippines champion (2014, 2016–2018); NCAA Philippines Finals Most Valuable Player (2018); 2x NCAA Philippines All-Star (2017, 2018); 2x NCAA Philippines Mythical Team (2017–2018); PBA D-League Aspirant's Cup champion (2017); 2× PCCL champion (2014, 2015 (Note: San Beda is co-champions with FEU.)); 2× Filoil Flying V Cup champion (2015, 2017); CBA Collegiate Mythical Five (2017)

Javee Dimalanta Mocon (born April 7, 1995) is a Filipino professional basketball player for the Meralco Bolts of the Philippine Basketball Association (PBA).

He played college basketball for the San Beda Red Lions in the NCAA, where they won four championships: Season 90 (2014) and three consecutive championships from Season 92 (2016) through 94 (2018). In his last season in the NCAA, he was named the Finals Most Valuable Player (Finals MVP). In each of his last two collegiate seasons, Mocon was an NCAA All-Star and a member of the NCAA Mythical Five.

Mocon was selected by the Rain or Shine Elasto Painters with the sixth overall pick in the 2018 PBA draft and was named to the PBA All-Rookie Team in the 2019 season. He has since played for Phoenix and NLEX before joining Meralco.

== High school career ==
Mocon, coached by the renowned Edmundo "Ato" Badolato, started playing for the San Beda's team in the boys' leagues. On his junior year, he joined and played for the San Beda Red Cubs in the NCAA from 2011 up to 2013. In all of those years, Mocon has won the juniors' basketball championship, with two out of the three seasons (87, 89), the Red Cubs swept all 18 elimination round games to qualify outright to the finals with the thrice to beat advantage. In season 88, the Red Cubs lost only one game to the Malayan Red Robins (60–64), ending the elimination round with a 17–1 record.

== College career ==
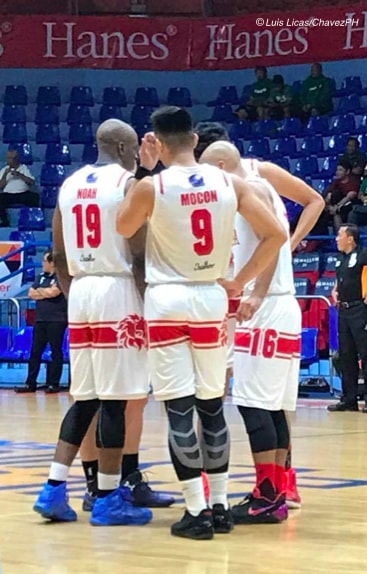
Mocon (center) with the San Beda Red Lions in 2017

Mocon, stayed with his alma mater and suited up for the Red Lions in 2014. He was part of the San Beda Red Lions team who won the title, San Beda's 5th consecutive, its eighth title in the past nine years and 19th overall men's basketball crown.

According to a Slam Philippines article during his rookie season, "he’s a legit 6’4” forward with low post footwork, he is a mean slasher off the triple-threat stance, and he has a respectable 15 foot jumper especially from the elbows. His rebounding and inside defense have been superb in the juniors, and that's what he expects to contribute right away to the defending 4-peat NCAA champs."

In his second year with the Red Lions, under new head coach Jamike Jarin, they fell short of securing a rare six-peat championship crown, ending as the runners-up in 2015. In an interview with Fox Sports, he stated, “I don’t want to remember that feeling and ‘yun ang motivation ko, sobrang sakit talaga nung matalo kami sa Letran, archrival pa namin."

== Professional career ==
In the 2018 PBA Draft, the Rain or Shine Elasto Painters drafted him with the 6th pick. In his PBA debut back on January 18, 2019, Mocon helped Rain or Shine on an 96–87 win over the NLEX Road Warriors. He finished the game with 13 points and 5 rebounds. On February 1, he grabbed a career-high 17 rebounds in a win against the San Miguel Beermen. For the month of February, he beat CJ Perez for Rookie of the Month, leading his team to a perfect record for that month. He also played in that season's Rookies vs. Sophomores game, scoring the game-winning tip-in basket. He won another Rookie of the Month award, this time for July. He ended the year as a member of the All-Rookie Team.

In Mocon's second season, he scored a career high 25 points on 7-of-9 shooting in a win also against the Beermen.

In March 2022, he became a restricted free agent. On June 7, his rights were traded to the Phoenix Super LPG Fuel Masters for Nick Demusis and two future draft picks. Hours later, Mocon officially signed a three-year deal with Phoenix Super LPG.

In September 2024, Mocon was traded to the NLEX Road Warriors for Ato Ular and a 2025 second-round pick.

On February 24, 2026, Mocon was traded by NLEX to the Meralco Bolts in a three-team trade with the Converge FiberXers.

== PBA career statistics ==
Legend
GP	Games played	MPG	Minutes per game	FG%	Field-goal percentage
3FG%	3-point field-goal percentage	4P%	4-point field-goal percentage	FT%	Free-throw percentage
RPG	Rebounds per game	APG	Assists per game	SPG	Steals per game
BPG	Blocks per game	PPG	Points per game	127	Career high

As of the end of 2025–26 season

=== Season-by-season averages ===
Year	Team	GP	MPG	FG%	3P%	4P%	FT%	RPG	APG	SPG	BPG	PPG
2019	Rain or Shine	48	27.1	.369	.278	—	.775	6.7	2.6	.6	.5	10.1
2020	Rain or Shine	12	34.4	.348	.283	—	.795	7.0	2.7	1.2	1.2	12.0
2021	Rain or Shine	24	32.7	.350	.320	—	.691	7.5	3.4	1.2	.4	11.8
2022–23	Phoenix Super LPG	29	30.8	.416	.344	—	.695	6.5	2.7	1.1	.4	11.6
2023–24	Phoenix Super LPG / Phoenix	27	29.1	.391	.287	—	.616	5.8	1.9	1.3	.5	8.0
2024–25	Phoenix	36	23.3	.443	.233	.000	.728	5.7	1.6	.7	.3	7.3
2024–25	NLEX	36	23.3	.443	.233	.000	.728	5.7	1.6	.7	.3	7.3
2025–26	NLEX	39	17.4	.477	.373	.000	.727	4.1	.9	.4	.4	6.7
2025–26	Meralco	39	17.4	.477	.373	.000	.727	4.1	.9	.4	.4	6.7
Career		215	26.5	.396	.303	.000	.721	6.0	2.1	.8	.5	9.3

== Personal life ==
Mocon married fashion model Maica Palo on April 26, 2023. They have one daughter together.
