= Ricci Rivero =

Filipino basketball player (born 1998)

No. 25 – Phoenix Super LPG Fuel Masters
- Position: Shooting guard
- League: PBA

Personal information
- Born: May 25, 1998 (age 28) Ilagan, Isabela, Philippines
- Listed height: 6 ft 1 in (1.85 m)
- Listed weight: 146 lb (66 kg)

Career information
- High school: La Salle Green Hills (Mandaluyong)
- College: De La Salle (2016–2018); UP (2019–2022)
- PBA draft: 2023: 2nd round, 17th overall pick
- Drafted by: Phoenix Super LPG Fuel Masters
- Playing career: 2023–present

Career history
- 2023–present: Phoenix Fuel Masters / Phoenix Super LPG Fuel Masters

Career highlights
- PBA All-Star (2024); 2× UAAP champion (2016, 2021); UAAP Mythical Team (2017); UAAP Most Improved Player (2017)
Medals
Men's basketball
Representing Philippines
SEABA U16 Championship
Gold medal – first place	2013 Yogyakarta	Team

Ricci Paolo Uy Rivero (/ˈriːtʃi/ REE-chee; born May 25, 1998) is a Filipino professional basketball player for the Phoenix Super LPG Fuel Masters of the Philippine Basketball Association (PBA). Rivero played for the De La Salle Green Archers in his first two years in collegiate basketball. His breakout performance in the UAAP Season 80 men's basketball tournament earned him a spot in the Mythical Five and the Most Improved Player award.

In April 2018, Rivero announced that he had left the De La Salle Green Archers to focus on Gilas Pilipinas. In May 2018, it was revealed that Rivero had transferred to be part of the University of the Philippines (UP) Fighting Maroons. Rivero suited up in UP starting season 82 of the UAAP.

He is also an actor who first featured in the MMFF film Otlum.

== Early life ==
Rivero was born and raised in Ilagan, Isabela to Ruzcko Rivero and Abigail Uy-Rivero. He is of Chinese descent through his mother.

He moved to Manila to complete his secondary education at La Salle Green Hills in Mandaluyong. In 2015, his final year of high school, he averaged 25.4 points, 8.8 rebounds, 2.8 assists, 2.4 steals, and 1.9 blocks in the elimination round for the Greenies, but lost to the Arellano Braves in the first round of the playoffs. In 2016, Rivero joined the De La Salle Green Archers.

== College career ==
=== De La Salle Green Archers ===
In 2016, his rookie season, the Archers won the championship.

In 2017, his sophomore season, Rivero averaged 14.1 points, 5.4 rebounds, 1.9 assists, and 1.7 steals. He led the Archers to the Finals, and earned Mythical Team Honors. He also won the Most Improved Player award. However, in January 2018, he was cut from the squad along with older brother Prince and reserve Brent Paraiso. The school said his suspension from the team was due to his endorsement deals, which are in conflict with a team rule. Later, in April, he announced on Twitter that he would exit the team.

=== UP Fighting Maroons ===
In May 2018, Rivero announced on Twitter that he would be joining the UP Fighting Maroons. He redshirted Season 81 (2018) due to UAAP's eligibility rules.

In Season 82, the Maroons made it to the semifinals where they lost to the UST Growling Tigers.

He played for UP in Season 84, despite getting offers to play overseas in Japan. They won the championship that season.

== Professional career ==
On June 24, 2022, Rivero signed with the Taoyuan Pilots of the P. League+. However, he was released before the season started due to an ankle injury.

On February 15, 2023, Rivero signed a short-term deal with the Blackwater Bossing Red President of the PBA 3x3.

In September 2023, Rivero made a bid to enter the Philippine Basketball Association by applying for the PBA season 48 draft, where he was selected with the 17th overall pick by the Phoenix Super LPG Fuel Masters. On October 2, he signed a two-year rookie contract with the team.

== PBA career statistics ==
Legend
GP	Games played	MPG	Minutes per game	FG%	Field-goal percentage
3FG%	3-point field-goal percentage	4P%	4-point field-goal percentage	FT%	Free-throw percentage
RPG	Rebounds per game	APG	Assists per game	SPG	Steals per game
BPG	Blocks per game	PPG	Points per game	127	Career high

As of the end of 2025–26 season

=== Season-by-season averages ===
Year	Team	GP	MPG	FG%	3P%	4P%	FT%	RPG	APG	SPG	BPG	PPG
2023–24	Phoenix Super LPG / Phoenix	28	14.4	.395	.200	—	.655	1.8	1.1	.5	.3	7.6
2024–25	Phoenix	31	18.7	.367	.270	.000	.700	2.2	2.1	.5	.3	7.0
2025–26	Phoenix / Phoenix Super LPG	35	28.7	.425	.295	.154	.686	5.7	3.3	.9	.4	16.5
Career		94	21.2	.406	.269	.111	.682	3.4	2.3	.7	.3	10.7

== National team career ==
Rivero first played for the Philippine national team in 2013, when the U16 team swept the SEABA Championships. He was considered for the "23 for 23" pool, a pool of Gilas Cadets for the 2023 FIBA World Cup. However, La Salle requested coach Chot Reyes to not include him in the lineup. He also practiced with the senior team during the 2019 FIBA World Cup qualifiers.

Rivero played in the 2015 U18 3x3 World Championship and in the 2018 U23 3x3 World Cup. He also joined the Philippines team for the 2019 3x3 Asia Cup, but hurt his ankle in their opener against Thailand.

== Off the court ==
=== Film and TV ===
In 2016, he participated in the finale of Nike Rise Philippines, a reality documentary basketball development program aired on TV5. He went up against Nike's final team along with other UAAP, NCAA and Perlas Pilipinas players.

In 2018, he starred in his first film, Otlum.

In 2020, Rivero became a permanent host of Brightlight Productions' Sunday Noontime Live!, which was aired on TV5 via a blocktime agreement. When that show closed, he announced that he would take a break from acting to focus on his studies and basketball.

=== Endorsements ===
Rivero is a very popular athlete, as he was named the "Most Tweeted and Most Talked-About Filipino Athlete" by Twitter Philippines. He is an endorser for numerous companies such as Honda, Globe, Gatorade, Nike, and many more.

In 2021, he appeared in a Pepsi ad that was shown in Times Square, N.Y.C.

== Filmography ==
=== Television ===
Year	Title	Role	Notes	Ref.
2021	Gen Z	Migo	Main Lead	

=== Film ===
Year	Title	Role	Notes	Ref.
2018	Otlum	Dindo	Main Cast	
2021	Happy Times	Kim	Main Lead	
2021	Rabid	Reggie	Main Cast	
2022	Day Zero	Paolo	Main Cast	

== Personal life ==
On April 9, 2022, Rivero confirmed that he was officially in a relationship with actress Andrea Brillantes. Their relationship lasted a little over a year before he announced on Twitter that they had split. On October 22, 2023, Rivero confirmed that he is in a relationship with beauty queen and politician Leren Bautista.

Before the start of UAAP Season 84, he pledged ₱250 to the UP Ikot Drivers Association who had been hit hard by the pandemic, for every point he scored. He was able to raise ₱154,200, and other supporters rounded out the donations to a total of ₱200,000.
