= Simon Camacho =

Filipino basketball player

No. 22 – Cebu Greats
- Position: Power forward
- League: MPBL

Personal information
- Born: 1995 or 1996 (age 30–31) Maragondon, Cavite, Philippines
- Listed height: 6 ft 5 in (1.96 m)

Career information
- College: Adamson
- PBA draft: 2019: 3rd round, 34th overall pick
- Drafted by: TNT KaTropa
- Playing career: 2019–present
- Number: 20, 24, 15

Career history
- 2019–2020: Bacolod Master Sardines
- 2021–2025: Phoenix Super LPG Fuel Masters / Phoenix Fuel Masters
- 2025: Abra Solid North Weavers
- 2026–present: Cebu Greats

Career highlights
- MPBL All-Star (2026)

Simon David R. Camacho (born 1995/1996) is a Filipino professional basketball player for the Cebu Greats of the Maharlika Pilipinas Basketball League (MPBL). He played college basketball for the Adamson Soaring Falcons of the University Athletic Association of the Philippines (UAAP). He plays at the power forward position.

== College career ==
A UAAP 82 team captain, Camacho was a known shot blocker for Adamson Soaring Falcons especially in his three straight Final Four appearances under coach Franz Pumaren from 2016 to 2018. He would later graduate from Adamson University with an information technology (IT) degree.

== Professional career ==
Camacho played for the Bacolod Master Sardines of the Maharlika Pilipinas Basketball League (MPBL) from 2019 to 2020.

He played for Medical Depot of the amateur Filbasket and won Most Valuable Player. After his stint with Medical Depot, on November 26, 2021, he signed with the Phoenix Super LPG Fuel Masters of the Philippine Basketball Association (PBA), reuniting with college teammate Sean Manganti.

On June 21, 2025, Camacho signed with the Abra Solid North Weavers.

== PBA career statistics ==
Legend
GP	Games played	MPG	Minutes per game	FG%	Field-goal percentage
3FG%	3-point field-goal percentage	4P%	4-point field-goal percentage	FT%	Free-throw percentage
RPG	Rebounds per game	APG	Assists per game	SPG	Steals per game
BPG	Blocks per game	PPG	Points per game	127	Career high

As of the end of 2024–25 season

=== Season-by-season averages ===
Year	Team	GP	MPG	FG%	3P%	4P%	FT%	RPG	APG	SPG	BPG	PPG
2021	Phoenix Super LPG	8	6.8	.615	—	—	.500	1.8	.4	.3	.4	2.1
2022–23	Phoenix Super LPG	24	10.9	.520	.250	—	.330	3.0	.5	.4	.3	2.4
2023–24	Phoenix Super LPG / Phoenix	25	5.4	.440	.000	—	.750	1.1	.1	.1	.4	1.0
2024–25	Phoenix	20	8.9	.654	.000	—	.727	2.8	.3	.2	.5	2.1
Career		77	8.1	.544	.143	—	.552	2.2	.3	.2	.4	1.8
