= Kenneth Tuffin =

Filipino-New Zealand basketball player

No. 20 – Phoenix Super LPG Fuel Masters
- Position: Small forward / shooting guard
- League: PBA

Personal information
- Born: 5 May 1997 (age 29) Wellington, New Zealand
- Listed height: 194 cm (6 ft 4 in)

Career information
- High school: St Patrick's College (Silverstream, New Zealand)
- College: FEU (2016–2019)
- PBA draft: 2023: 1st round, 6th overall pick
- Drafted by: Phoenix Super LPG Fuel Masters
- Playing career: 2020–present

Career history
- 2020: Taranaki Mountainairs
- 2021–2023: Wellington Saints
- 2023–present: Phoenix Fuel Masters / Phoenix Super LPG Fuel Masters

Career highlights
- PBA All-Rookie Team (2024); NZNBL champion (2021)

Kenneth James Diocares Tuffin (born 5 May 1997) is a Filipino-New Zealand basketball player for the Phoenix Super LPG Fuel Masters of the Philippine Basketball Association (PBA).

== Early life and education ==
Tuffin was born on 5 May 1997 in New Zealand, spending his childhood in Wellington. As a child, Tuffin had watched games of the New Zealand National Basketball League and his father used to take him to basketball games.

For his high school studies, Tuffin attended St. Patrick's College in Upper Hutt. He was widely involved in his high school's academic program, playing for St Patrick's basketball, cricket, and rugby teams.

He moved to the Philippines at age 18 to pursue collegiate studies at the Far Eastern University in Manila.

== Collegiate career ==
Tuffin played for the FEU Tamaraws basketball team which played at the University Athletic Association of the Philippines (UAAP). FEU did not finish outside the Final Four, in all seasons that Tuffin played (Season 79 to 82; 2016–2019). In Season 82, Tuffin was made captain of the Tamaraws.

== Professional career ==
=== New Zealand ===
==== Taranaki Mountaineers (2020) ====
Tuffin was the 44th overall selection in New Zealand NBL for the 2020 season. He was selected by the Taranaki Mountainairs. Prior to the draft, Tuffin secured consent from FEU to play in the NBL and joined the league as an amateur player.

He planned to play professionally after he graduated from FEU to potentially play in the Philippine Basketball Association. However, in December 2020, he decided to forego his final year of eligibility to play for FEU after UAAP Season 83's cancellation and decided to turn professional.

==== Wellington Saints (2021–2023) ====
After suiting up for the Taranaki Mountaineers, Tuffin moved to the Wellington Saints for the 2021 season. Tuffin was acquired by Wellington after the team decided to skip the 2020 season. He continued on with the Saints in 2022 and 2023.

=== Philippines ===
==== Phoenix Fuel Masters (2023–present) ====
In 2023, he returned to the Philippines and applied for the PBA season 48 draft, where he was selected sixth overall by the Phoenix Super LPG Fuel Masters. On October 2, 2023, he signed a three-year rookie contract with the team.

== Career statistics ==
=== PBA ===
Legend
GP	Games played	MPG	Minutes per game	FG%	Field-goal percentage
3FG%	3-point field-goal percentage	4P%	4-point field-goal percentage	FT%	Free-throw percentage
RPG	Rebounds per game	APG	Assists per game	SPG	Steals per game
BPG	Blocks per game	PPG	Points per game	**127**	Career high

As of the end of 2024–25 season

==== Season-by-season averages ====
Year	Team	GP	MPG	FG%	3P%	4P%	FT%	RPG	APG	SPG	BPG	PPG
2023–24	Phoenix Super LPG / Phoenix	28	**30.7**	.425	.352	—	.647	5.0	**1.8**	**.6**	.1	10.7
2024–25	Phoenix	33	22.6	**.509**	**.421**	—	**.813**	4.3	.9	.5	.1	7.9
2025–26	Phoenix / Phoenix Super LPG	**36**	27.8	.437	.399	.200	.692	**5.7**	1.5	**.6**	.1	**11.3**
Career		97	26.9	.450	.388	.200	.714	5.0	1.4	.6	.1	10.0

=== NZNBL ===
Legend
GP	Games played	MPG	Minutes per game
FG%	Field-goal percentage	3P%	3-point field-goal percentage	FT%	Free-throw percentage
RPG	Rebounds per game	APG	Assists per game	SPG	Steals per game
BPG	Blocks per game	PPG	Points per game	**Bold**	Career high

==== Season-by-season averages ====
Year	Team	GP	MPG	FG%	3P%	FT%	RPG	APG	SPG	BPG	PPG
2020	Taranaki	15	**23.6**	.450	.431	**.938**	**4.3**	.9	.7	**.2**	**9.2**
2021	Wellington	**20**	22.8	**.496**	**.493**	.737	3.3	.8	**1.2**	.1	8.4
2022	Wellington	19	22.9	.403	.378	.750	2.7	**1.0**	.8	.1	8.2
2023	Wellington	19	14.0	.379	.324	.900	2.0	.6	.7	.1	3.7
Career		73	20.7	.437	.417	.808	3.0	.8	.9	.1	7.3

== National team career ==
Tuffin is eligible to play for the national teams of the Philippines and New Zealand. He is among the 23 youths included in the Philippines' #23for23 pool of players for the 2023 FIBA World Cup. He was also included in New Zealand's pool for the 2020 Summer Olympics and the 2022 Commonwealth Games.

== Personal life ==
Tuffin's mother was born in Rosario, La Union, and has relatives living in the provinces of Pampanga and Pangasinan.
