= Raul Soyud =

Filipino basketball player

No. 8 – San Juan Knights
- Position: Center
- League: MPBL

Personal information
- Born: January 14, 1991 (age 35) Bago, Negros Occidental, Philippines
- Listed height: 6 ft 6 in (1.98 m)
- Listed weight: 222 lb (101 kg)

Career information
- High school: WNU (Bacolod)
- College: UP
- PBA draft: 2014: 3rd round, 31st overall pick
- Drafted by: Blackwater Elite
- Playing career: 2015–present

Career history
- 2015–2022: NLEX Road Warriors
- 2022: TNT Tropang Giga
- 2023–2025: Phoenix Super LPG Fuel Masters / Phoenix Fuel Masters
- 2025–present: San Juan Knights

Raul Soyud (born January 14, 1991) is a Filipino professional basketball player for the San Juan Knights of the Maharlika Pilipinas Basketball League (MPBL). He played college basketball for the UP Fighting Maroons of the University Athletic Association of the Philippines (UAAP).

== Professional career ==
He was drafted 31st overall by the Blackwater Elite during the 2014 PBA draft but never played for the team.

He joined the NLEX Road Warriors in 2015, initially playing in limited games. He became a regular in the rotation of the team when Yeng Guiao became the team's head coach.

On September 19, 2022, Soyud was traded to the TNT Tropang Giga in a three-team trade involving TNT, NLEX, and Blackwater Bossing.

On January 18, 2023, Soyud was traded to the Phoenix Super LPG Fuel Masters in a three-team trade involving Phoenix, TNT, and NLEX Road Warriors.

== PBA career statistics ==
Legend
GP	Games played	MPG	Minutes per game	FG%	Field-goal percentage
3FG%	3-point field-goal percentage	4P%	4-point field-goal percentage	FT%	Free-throw percentage
RPG	Rebounds per game	APG	Assists per game	SPG	Steals per game
BPG	Blocks per game	PPG	Points per game	127	Career high

As of the end of 2024–25 season

=== Season-by-season averages ===
Year	Team	GP	MPG	FG%	3P%	4P%	FT%	RPG	APG	SPG	BPG	PPG
2014–15	NLEX	2	3.1	.000	—	—	—	.5	—	—	—	—
2015–16	NLEX	4	5.5	.333	.000	—	1.000	.8	—	—	—	1.5
2016–17	NLEX	31	12.1	.472	.341	—	.656	3.9	.4	.2	.5	4.9
2017–18	NLEX	32	12.4	.569	.385	—	.610	3.7	.3	.1	.3	5.0
2019	NLEX	32	10.3	.545	.346	—	.679	3.4	.5	.2	.2	4.3
2020	NLEX	11	18.5	.738	.364	—	.615	6.8	1.1	.1	.1	10.0
2021	NLEX	22	17.7	.596	.333	—	.625	6.0	.5	.4	.4	6.0
2022–23	NLEX	23	10.9	.542	.154	—	.500	2.9	.6	.1	.1	3.1
2022–23	TNT	23	10.9	.542	.154	—	.500	2.9	.6	.1	.1	3.1
2022–23	Phoenix Super LPG	23	10.9	.542	.154	—	.500	2.9	.6	.1	.1	3.1
2023–24	Phoenix Super LPG / Phoenix	18	6.7	.387	.111	—	1.000	2.1	.3	.2	.2	1.7
2024–25	Phoenix	21	9.9	.694	.556	—	.542	2.9	.3	.3	.2	4.1
Career		196	11.8	.561	.331	—	.629	3.7	.4	.2	.3	4.5
