= List of Phoenix Fuel Masters seasons =

The Phoenix Fuel Masters joined the Philippine Basketball Association (PBA) in 2016 following the acquisition of the Barako Bull Energy franchise of the Lina Group by Phoenix Petroleum Philippines, Inc. The team began play in the 2016 PBA Commissioner's Cup, the second conference of the 2015–16 PBA season.

== Records per conference ==
Note: Statistics are correct as of the end of the 2025 PBA Philippine Cup.

Conference champions	Conference runners-up	Conference semifinalists	Playoff berth	Eighth seed playoff

Season	Conference	Elimination round						Playoffs	
Season	Conference	Finish	Played	Wins	Losses	Win %	GB	Round	Results
Phoenix Fuel Masters
2015–16 (team)	Commissioner's	11th	11	3	8	.273	5	Did not qualify	
2015–16 (team)	Governors'	8th	11	5	6	.455	5	Eighth seed playoff Quarterfinals	won vs. Rain or Shine, 105–94 lost vs. TNT, 124–136 (Note: Opposing team had a twice-to-beat advantage.)
2016–17 (team)	Philippine	6th	11	6	5	.545	4	Quarterfinals	lost vs. Star, 0–2
2016–17 (team)	Commissioner's	7th	11	4	7	.364	5	Quarterfinals	lost vs. San Miguel, 96–115
2016–17 (team)	Governors'	11th	11	2	9	.182	7	Did not qualify	
2017–18 (team)	Philippine	9th	11	5	6	.455	3	Eighth seed playoff	lost vs. TNT, 97–118
2017–18 (team)	Commissioner's	10th	11	4	7	.364	5	Did not qualify	
2017–18 (team)	Governors'	2nd	11	8	3	.727	1	Quarterfinals	lost vs. Meralco in two games (Note: Team had a twice-to-beat advantage.)
Phoenix Pulse Fuel Masters
2019 (team)	Philippine	1st	11	9	2	.818	—	Quarterfinals; Semifinals	won vs. Alaska, 91–76 lost vs. San Miguel, 1–4
2019 (team)	Commissioner's	10th	11	4	7	.364	6	Did not qualify	
2019 (team)	Governors'	11th	11	3	8	.273	5	Did not qualify	
Phoenix Super LPG Fuel Masters
2020 (team)	Philippine	2nd	11	8	3	.727	—	Quarterfinals; Semifinals	won vs. Magnolia, 89–88 lost vs. TNT, 2–3
2021 (team)	Philippine	9th	11	4	7	.364	6	Eighth seed playoff	lost vs. Barangay Ginebra, 85–95
2021 (team)	Governors'	8th	11	5	6	.455	4	Eighth seed playoff Quarterfinals	won vs. NorthPort, 101–98 lost vs. Magnolia, 88–127
2022–23 (team)	Philippine	11th	11	3	8	.273	6	Did not qualify	
2022–23 (team)	Commissioner's	7th	12	6	6	.500	4	Quarterfinals	lost vs. Magnolia, 95–102
2022–23 (team)	Governors'	8th	11	4	7	.364	6	Quarterfinals	lost vs. TNT, 105–132
2023–24 (team)	Commissioner's	4th	11	8	3	.727	1	Quarterfinals; Semifinals	won vs. Meralco in two games lost vs. Magnolia, 1–3
Phoenix Fuel Masters
2023–24 (team)	Philippine	11th	11	3	8	.273	7	Did not qualify	
2024–25 (team)	Governors'	6th (Group B)	10	1	9	.100	6	Did not qualify	
2024–25 (team)	Commissioner's	12th	12	3	9	.250	6	Did not qualify	
2024–25 (team)	Philippine	9th	11	4	7	.364	4	Did not qualify	
Elimination round record			243	102	141	.420		12 playoff appearances	
Playoff record			31	9	22	.290		0 finals appearances	
Cumulative record			274	111	163	.405		0 championships	

== Records per season ==
Note: Statistics are correct as of the end of the 2025 PBA Philippine Cup.

Season	Stage	Played	Wins	Losses	Win %	Best finish
2015–16 (team)	Elimination round	22	8	14	.364	Quarterfinals
2015–16 (team)	Playoffs	2	1	1	.500	Quarterfinals
2015–16 (team)	Overall	24	9	15	.375	Quarterfinals
2016–17 (team)	Elimination round	33	12	21	.364	Quarterfinals
2016–17 (team)	Playoffs	3	0	3	.000	Quarterfinals
2016–17 (team)	Overall	36	12	24	.333	Quarterfinals
2017–18 (team)	Elimination round	33	17	16	.515	Quarterfinals
2017–18 (team)	Playoffs	3	0	3	.000	Quarterfinals
2017–18 (team)	Overall	36	17	19	.472	Quarterfinals
2019 (team)	Elimination round	33	16	17	.485	Semifinals
2019 (team)	Playoffs	6	2	4	.333	Semifinals
2019 (team)	Overall	39	18	21	.462	Semifinals
2020 (team)	Elimination round	11	8	3	.727	Semifinals
2020 (team)	Playoffs	6	3	3	.500	Semifinals
2020 (team)	Overall	17	11	6	.647	Semifinals
2021 (team)	Elimination round	22	9	13	.409	Quarterfinals
2021 (team)	Playoffs	3	1	2	.333	Quarterfinals
2021 (team)	Overall	25	10	15	.400	Quarterfinals
2022–23 (team)	Elimination round	34	13	21	.382	Quarterfinals
2022–23 (team)	Playoffs	2	0	2	.000	Quarterfinals
2022–23 (team)	Overall	36	13	23	.361	Quarterfinals
2023–24 (team)	Elimination round	22	11	11	.500	Semifinals
2023–24 (team)	Playoffs	6	2	4	.333	Semifinals
2023–24 (team)	Overall	28	13	15	.464	Semifinals
2024–25 (team)	Elimination round	33	8	25	.242	Elimination round
2024–25 (team)	Playoffs	Did not qualify				Elimination round
2024–25 (team)	Overall	33	8	25	.242	Elimination round
