= Sean Manganti =

Filipino-American basketball player (born 1994)

Free agent
- Position: Small forward

Personal information
- Born: April 18, 1994 (age 32) San Diego, California, U.S.
- Listed height: 6 ft 5 in (1.96 m)

Career information
- High school: Chaparral (Temecula, California)
- College: UMPI (2013–2014); Adamson (2016–2018)
- PBA draft: 2019: 1st round8th overall (Note: The 2019 draft was composed of two drafts: the Gilas special draft, which consists of 5 players reserved for the Gilas Pilipinas program, and the regular draft. Manganti was selected as the eighth pick of the regular draft.)
- Drafted by: NorthPort Batang Pier
- Playing career: 2019–present

Career history
- 2019: Bataan Risers
- 2020: NorthPort Batang Pier
- 2021–2025: Phoenix Super LPG Fuel Masters / Phoenix Fuel Masters

Sean Paul Dabu Manganti (born April 18, 1994) is a Filipino-American professional basketball player who last played for the Phoenix Fuel Masters of the Philippine Basketball Association (PBA). He played college basketball for the Adamson Soaring Falcons of the University Athletic Association of the Philippines (UAAP). He plays at the small forward position.

== College career ==
=== Adamson Soaring Falcons ===
Manganti led Adamson to three straight Final Four appearances under coach Franz Pumaren from 2016 to 2018.

== Professional career ==
Manganti was picked eighth in the first round of the 2019 PBA Draft by NorthPort Batang Pier.

On November 5, 2021, Manganti, along with Sean Anthony and a 2021 second-round draft pick, was traded to Phoenix Super LPG Fuel Masters for Michael Calisaan and Vic Manuel.

== PBA career statistics ==
Legend
GP	Games played	MPG	Minutes per game	FG%	Field-goal percentage
3FG%	3-point field-goal percentage	4P%	4-point field-goal percentage	FT%	Free-throw percentage
RPG	Rebounds per game	APG	Assists per game	SPG	Steals per game
BPG	Blocks per game	PPG	Points per game	127	Career high

As of the end of 2025–26 season

=== Season-by-season averages ===
Year	Team	GP	MPG	FG%	3P%	4P%	FT%	RPG	APG	SPG	BPG	PPG
2020	NorthPort	11	18.5	.268	.226	—	.619	2.9	1.5	.4	.4	4.5
2021	Phoenix Super LPG	13	19.4	.346	.300	—	.643	2.8	.7	.5	.3	6.0
2022–23	Phoenix Super LPG	25	14.9	.460	.339	—	.826	2.2	.6	.3	.1	5.7
2023–24	Phoenix Super LPG / Phoenix	23	13.3	.387	.339	—	.679	1.5	1.0	.3	.3	4.8
2024–25	Phoenix	30	10.7	.344	.360	.333	.829	1.5	.6	.3	.1	3.8
2025–26	Phoenix	10	11.0	.414	.368	—	.714	1.2	.7	.3	.1	4.1
Career		112	14.0	.377	.325	.333	.733	1.9	.8	.3	.2	4.8
