= Larry Muyang =

Filipino basketball player

No. 20 – Converge FiberXers
- Position: Center
- League: PBA

Personal information
- Born: June 4, 1995 (age 31) Santa Ana, Pampanga, Philippines
- Listed height: 6 ft 6 in (1.98 m)
- Listed weight: 220 lb (100 kg)

Career information
- College: De La Salle; Letran
- PBA draft: 2020: 1st round, 7th overall pick
- Drafted by: Phoenix Super LPG Fuel Masters
- Playing career: 2018–present

Career history
- 2018–2019: San Juan Knights
- 2020: Pampanga Giant Lanterns
- 2021–2025: Phoenix Super LPG Fuel Masters / Phoenix Fuel Masters
- 2025: Pampanga Giant Lanterns
- 2025–present: Converge FiberXers

Career highlights
- MPBL champion (2019); All-MPBL Second Team (2025); MPBL All-Star (2025); NCAA Philippines champion (2019); NCAA Philippines Rookie of the Year (2018)

Larry Lopez Muyang (born June 4, 1995) is a Filipino professional basketball player for the Converge FiberXers of the Philippine Basketball Association (PBA).

== College career ==
Muyang first played for the De La Salle Green Archers to begin his college career. In 2017, he moved to the Letran Knights. In his first season with Letran during NCAA Season 94, he won NCAA Philippines' Rookie of the Year award. In 2019, he won a championship with Letran in NCAA Season 95.

== Amateur career ==
=== San Juan Knights (2018–2019) ===
In 2018, Muyang joined the expansion San Juan Knights of the Maharlika Pilipinas Basketball League (MPBL), where he won a championship in 2019.

=== Pampanga Giant Lanterns (2019–2020) ===
Muyang didn't return to San Juan for the following season, and in 2020, moved to his hometown team, the Pampanga Giant Lanterns.

== Professional career ==
=== Phoenix Fuel Masters (2021–2025) ===
On November 28, 2020, Muyang announced that he would enter the upcoming PBA season 46 draft. In said draft, he was selected with the seventh pick of the first round by the Phoenix Super LPG Fuel Masters.

=== Return to Pampanga (2025) ===
In 2025, Muyang returned to the MPBL, once again playing for Pampanga despite being still under contract by Phoenix. Paolo Bugia, Fuel Masters team manager, said that the team penalized Muyang after he was caught playing in an unsanctioned game in March. After which, Muyang "made a decision to go [to the MPBL]", but Phoenix "just wanted to move forward". The Fuel Masters have since submitted a letter to the PBA about the situation. On April 13, Muyang was formally handed an indefinite ban from the PBA, with the option to appeal to the board of governors.

=== Converge FiberXers (2025–present) ===
On September 4, his PBA playing rights were handed to the Converge FiberXers as part of a larger three-team trade with Phoenix and the NorthPort Batang Pier. It was eventually confirmed by new Converge head coach Dennis Pineda that Muyang's ban from the PBA was lifted and that he would join after the 2025 MPBL season.

On October 21, after his stint with the Pampanga in the MPBL, Muyang signed with the Converge, making his return in the PBA.

== Career statistics ==
=== PBA ===
Legend
| GP | Games played | MPG | Minutes per game | FG% | Field-goal percentage |
| 3FG% | 3-point field-goal percentage | 4P% | 4-point field-goal percentage | FT% | Free-throw percentage |
| RPG | Rebounds per game | APG | Assists per game | SPG | Steals per game |
| BPG | Blocks per game | PPG | Points per game | **127** | Career high |

As of the end of 2024–25 season

=== Season-by-season averages ===
| Year | Team | GP | MPG | FG% | 3P% | 4P% | FT% | RPG | APG | SPG | BPG | PPG |
|---|---|---|---|---|---|---|---|---|---|---|---|---|
| 2021 | Phoenix Super LPG | 15 | 7.9 | .469 | **.400** | — | **.900** | 1.9 | .1 | — | **.2** | 2.7 |
| 2022–23 | Phoenix Super LPG | **31** | **10.5** | **.578** | **.400** | — | .685 | **2.9** | **.3** | .2 | **.2** | **5.0** |
| 2023–24 | Phoenix Super LPG / Phoenix | 21 | 9.9 | .368 | .222 | — | .727 | 2.4 | **.3** | — | .1 | 3.5 |
| 2024–25 | Phoenix | 18 | 9.5 | .383 | .325 | .000 | .571 | 2.0 | **.3** | — | .1 | 3.5 |
| Career | | 85 | 9.7 | .466 | .311 | .000 | .714 | 2.4 | .3 | .1 | .1 | 3.0 |

=== MPBL ===
Legend
| GP | Games played | GS | Games started | MPG | Minutes per game |
| FG% | Field-goal percentage | 3P% | 3-point field-goal percentage | FT% | Free-throw percentage |
| RPG | Rebounds per game | APG | Assists per game | SPG | Steals per game |
| BPG | Blocks per game | PPG | Points per game | **Bold** | Career high |

As of the end of 2025 season

==== Season-by-season averages ====
| Year | Team | GP | GS | MPG | FG% | 3P% | FT% | RPG | APG | SPG | BPG | PPG |
|---|---|---|---|---|---|---|---|---|---|---|---|---|
| 2018–19 | San Juan | 23 | 11 | 17.9 | .528 | — | .719 | 6.9 | .8 | .5 | .9 | 6.9 |
| 2019–20 | Pampanga | 9 | 1 | 19.0 | **.667** | — | **.828** | 7.3 | .6 | **.6** | .6 | 7.6 |
| 2025 | Pampanga | **27** | **19** | **25.4** | .583 | **.314** | .662 | **10.8** | **1.7** | .5 | **1.0** | **14.4** |
