= Ato Ular =

Filipino basketball player

No. 5 – Titan Ultra Giant Risers
- Position: Power forward
- League: PBA

Personal information
- Born: May 4, 1995 (age 31) Tarlac City, Tarlac, Philippines
- Listed height: 6 ft 4 in (1.93 m)
- Listed weight: 196 lb (89 kg)

Career information
- High school: Padapada National (Santa Ignacia, Tarlac)
- College: Tarlac State; Letran
- PBA draft: 2022: 2nd round, 13th overall pick
- Drafted by: Blackwater Bossing
- Playing career: 2021–present

Career history
- 2021–2022: Marikina Shoemasters
- 2022–2024: Blackwater Bossing
- 2024: NLEX Road Warriors
- 2024–2025: Phoenix Fuel Masters
- 2025–present: Titan Ultra Giant Risers

Career highlights
- PBA All-Rookie Team (2023); MPBL All-Star (2020); NCAA Philippines champion (2019)

Renato Ular (born May 4, 1995) is a Filipino professional basketball player for the Titan Ultra Giant Risers of the Philippine Basketball Association (PBA). He played college basketball for the Letran Knights

== College career ==
Ular first played for Tarlac State University, and led them to a SCUAA (State Colleges and Universities Athletic Association) championship. He was then recruited to join the Arellano Chiefs in the NCAA, where he played on their Team B.

Ular was then recruited by Coach Aldin Ayo to play for the Letran Knights. Ayo however, left Letran in his rookie season, and he had limited minutes under Coach Jeff Napa. He did get to compete in the NCAA's Slam Dunk Contest. After his rookie season, he was cut from Team A.

Ular would still be on Letran's reserve pool, representing Letran in another dunk contest. He would spend the next two years as an amateur player for the Marikina Shoemasters. He returned to Letran's main lineup for Season 95 after new head coach Bonnie Tan saw him in a tuneup game between Letran and Marikina.

Ular started the season with averages of 11.7 points and seven rebounds a game, with him getting a double-double of 19 points and 13 rebounds in a win over the Perpetual Altas. He then had 19 points, nine rebounds and a clutch block in a win over the EAC Generals. In a win over the JRU Heavy Bombers, he had 17 points, seven rebounds, and two steals. Letran then lost to the Mapúa Cardinals, in which he had 19 points and 23 rebounds. In a crucial win over the Benilde Blazers, he had 20 points on a 75% shooting clip to go along with eight rebounds. He helped Letran get into the Final Four with a double-double of 17 points and 16 rebounds in a rematch against Perpetual. From there, Letran won the Season 95 championship against the San Beda Red Lions.

Ular was set for one more year at Letran. However, due to the COVID-19 pandemic, he wasn't able to play out his final year.

== Professional career ==
=== Marikina Shoemasters (2021–2022) ===
Ular returned to the Shoemasters in the 2021 MPBL Invitational preseason tournament this time as a professional player. He helped Marikina get its first win in the tournament with a double-double of 16 points and 12 rebounds. Marikina then lost its next game despite him posting 16 points and 19 rebounds. In a loss to the Basilan Jumbo Plastic, he had 25 points, 16 rebounds, four assists, a block, and a steal. He was later awarded as the tournament's Defensive Player of the Year as he led the league in rebounds with 16 a game.

=== Blackwater Bossing (2022–2024) ===
==== 2022–23: Rookie season ====
Ular was selected 13th overall pick by the Blackwater Bossing in 2022 PBA draft. He was one of five Letran Knights taken in that year's draft. He was given a two-year contract.

In his PBA debut during the 2022 Philippine Cup, Ular scored 10 points in a win over TNT Tropang Giga. In a win over the NorthPort Batang Pier, he led with 17 points and five rebounds. He then scored 16 points in a win over the Terrafirma Dyip to lead Blackwater to a 3–1 record, their best start to a Philippine Cup campaign. In a win over the Meralco Bolts, he had a double-double of 19 points and 15 rebounds, including a clutch offensive rebound and putback. In Blackwater's first five games, he averaged 14.4 points and 7.2 rebounds. For his performance, he was awarded Player of the Week, the first rookie to be awarded that season and the first Blackwater player since Bobby Ray Parks Jr. in the 2019 Commissioner's Cup. He then dropped a career-high 34 points along with 10 rebounds as Blackwater won their fourth straight game. His 34 points are the most by any second-round draftee since Jeff Chan scored 34 points as well for the Rain or Shine Elasto Painters in December 2013. Their win streak was ended by the San Miguel Beermen, who limited him to just eight points and eight rebounds. They then lost to Rain or Shine despite his 13 points and nine rebounds. Despite slipping in the standings, Blackwater still managed to get into the conference's playoffs, where they lost to the Beermen.

Blackwater started the 2022–23 Commissioner's Cup with a 46-point loss to the Bay Area Dragons in which he had 13 points and 14 rebounds (with nine of those rebounds on the offensive end). In a win over Terrafirma, he grabbed 12 rebounds. Blackwater kept losing that conference, despite his efforts, falling to 11th place in the standings. In an overtime loss to Meralco, he had a double-double of 15 points and 13 rebounds. He then had 20 points and six rebounds in a loss to Barangay Ginebra. Blackwater ended its campaign with six straight losses, failing to make the playoffs.

Blackwater continued to lose in the Governors' Cup, starting with a loss to the NLEX Road Warriors in which he had a double-double of 14 points and 11 rebounds. They finally stopped their losing streak with a win over the Phoenix Super LPG Fuel Masters in which he had 14 points and 11 rebounds once again. Blackwater then lost to Terrafirma in which he had 10 points and 12 rebounds. In a loss to Ginebra, he had 12 points and 12 rebounds. Blackwater finished that conference 1–10. He did get to compete in the Obstacle Challenge during that year's PBA All-Star Week. He also played in the RSJ Game, contributing 23 points and 11 rebounds for the winning team.

=== NLEX Road Warriors (2024) ===
On February 26, 2024, Ular was traded to the NLEX Road Warriors in a three-team trade involving NLEX, Blackwater, and TNT Tropang Giga.

=== Phoenix Fuel Masters (2024–2025) ===
On September 11, 2024, Ular, along with a 2025 second-round pick, was traded to the Phoenix Fuel Masters for Javee Mocon.

=== Titan Ultra Giant Risers (2025–present) ===
On October 2, 2025, Ular was traded to the Titan Ultra Giant Risers in exchange for James Kwekuteye.

== PBA career statistics ==
Legend
GP	Games played	MPG	Minutes per game	FG%	Field-goal percentage
3FG%	3-point field-goal percentage	4P%	4-point field-goal percentage	FT%	Free-throw percentage
RPG	Rebounds per game	APG	Assists per game	SPG	Steals per game
BPG	Blocks per game	PPG	Points per game	127	Career high

As of the end of 2025–26 season

=== Season-by-season averages ===
Year	Team	GP	MPG	FG%	3P%	4P%	FT%	RPG	APG	SPG	BPG	PPG
2022–23	Blackwater	34	27.8	.491	.217	—	.800	9.1	.9	.4	.3	11.2
2023–24	Blackwater	11	12.7	.613	.000	—	.692	3.3	.2	.5	.3	4.3
2023–24	NLEX	11	12.7	.613	.000	—	.692	3.3	.2	.5	.3	4.3
2024–25	Phoenix	25	5.8	.212	.167	—	1.000	1.6	.2	.2	.1	.8
2025–26	Titan Ultra	35	14.6	.440	.182	—	.533	3.4	.5	.2	.2	5.4
Career		105	16.6	.465	.198	—	.750	4.8	.5	.3	.2	6.1
