= Jjay Alejandro =

Filipino basketball player (born 1995)

Lyceum Pirates
- Title: Assistant coach
- League: National Collegiate Athletic Association

Personal information
- Born: April 13, 1995 (age 31) Caloocan, Philippines
- Listed height: 6 ft 0 in (1.83 m)
- Listed weight: 165 lb (75 kg)

Career information
- High school: Malayan (Manila)
- College: NU (2013–2017)
- PBA draft: 2018: 1st round, 8th overall pick
- Drafted by: Rain or Shine Elasto Painters
- Playing career: 2019–2025
- Position: Shooting guard
- Coaching career: 2026–present

Career history

Playing
- 2019: Rain or Shine Elasto Painters
- 2020–2023: TNT Tropang Giga
- 2023–2025: Phoenix Fuel Masters

Coaching
- 2026–present: Lyceum (assistant)

Career highlights
- PBA champion (2021 Philippine); UAAP champion (2014); UAAP Mythical Team (2017)

Rodolfo "Jjay" Alejandro III (born April 13, 1995) is a Filipino basketball player who last played for the Phoenix Fuel Masters of the Philippine Basketball Association (PBA) and is currently an assistant coach for the Lyceum Pirates. He was selected in the first round of the 2018 PBA draft by the Rain or Shine Elasto Painters with the eighth overall pick. In college, he played for the NU Bulldogs, winning a UAAP championship with them in 2014 and making the Mythical Team in 2017.

== Early life and high school career ==
Alejandro grew up in a basketball family. His father, Rodolfo "J-Are" Alejandro Jr., was a former amateur and semi-pro player who gave him the nickname "Junior Junior" which would later be shortened to "Jjay". His godfathers include former PBA player Mar Morelos, Rodolfo Jr.’s college teammate Jojo Castillo and La Salle-Araneta coach Jun Bosque. He didn't like basketball at first, but he eventually found his talent as a scorer.

Alejandro played for his home city Caloocan in the Jr. PBA tournament in 2007. Despite this, he was not recruited entering high school, so he tried out for the Mapúa Red Robins, which played in the juniors division of the NCAA. He made the team as a freshman. When he first joined the Red Robins, their team was often overwhelmed by stronger squads, with teams blowing them out by as much as 125 points. Keith Agovida of the JRU Light Bombers once scored 82 points on their team. They were unable to win any games in his freshman season, going 0–12.

Alejandro then became a starter in his sophomore season and they started to win more games. Although he had offers to transfer to stronger high school programs such as La Salle Green Hills, he chose to stay with Mapúa. By his senior season, he led the league in scoring with 25.4 points and was in the top 10 in assists with 4.4 assists. He also scored a career-high 46 points against Agovida's team. His senior season would also be the closest they got to the Final Four, as they just missed out to the EAC Brigadiers.

== College career ==
On February 19, 2012, Alejandro committed to the NU Bulldogs in the UAAP. He was on the roster beginning in Season 76, but saw limited action with only 2.1 points in 6.6 minutes of play.

In Season 77, Alejandro scored 20 points off the bench in a semifinal game against the Ateneo Blue Eagles that forced a do-or-die game. NU went on to win the following game, and make it to the finals to face the FEU Tamaraws. In Game 3, he scored 10 points and made key plays on offense and defense during the second quarter and third quarters to give NU its first championship in 60 years.

In Season 78, Alejandro continued to grow as an off-the-bench scorer. He scored 25 points in a win over the DLSU Green Archers. As the defending champions, the Bulldogs were able to make it to the Final Four, where they were eliminated by the UST Growling Tigers.

During the offseason, the Bulldogs played in the 2016 PBA D-League Aspirants' Cup. They made it to the quarterfinals, where they lost to FEU. At the start of Season 79, NU started with a 4–2 record. In a game against FEU, Alejandro scored a college career-high 31 points along with nine rebounds, but they lost to close out the first round eliminations with a 4–3 record. From there, they lost five more games for a losing streak of six straight, failing to make the Final Four with a 5–9 record.

In his final season, Season 80, Alejandro had a new coach, Jamike Jarin. Jarin made him the Bulldogs' team captain alongside Matt Salem. In the opening game, he contributed 11 points, five rebounds, seven assists, and five steals to give Jarin his first win with NU. In a win over UST, he had 12 points, but had 10 rebounds and eight assists. Throughout the first three games of the season, he struggled with his shooting, but contributed in other areas with 6.6 rebounds and 6.6 assists. He then scored 25 points against the Adamson Soaring Falcons, but they lost as he was the only one in double figures. He followed it up with 24 points against Ateneo, but they lost once again. In a loss to the UE Red Warriors, he had 16 points, eight rebounds, and 10 assists, then followed it up with 22 points, seven rebounds, five assists, and three steals in another loss to Ateneo. A loss to DLSU then sent NU into the brink of elimination. In a must-win game against FEU, with NU down by 15 in the fourth quarter, he led their comeback and made the go-ahead win to keep their season alive. However, a loss to the UP Fighting Maroons officially ended their season with a record of 5–9, similar to the previous season. He made the Mythical Team with averages of 16.6 points, 6.4 rebounds, 6.7 assists, and 1.7 steals.

== Professional career ==
=== Rain or Shine Elasto Painters ===
Alejandro was drafted by the Rain or Shine Elasto Painters with the eighth overall pick of the 2018 PBA draft. He signed with Rain or Shine for three years.

Against the TNT Katropa during the 2019 Philippine Cup, Alejandro made his first start and scored his first 11 points of his PBA career. In his one season with Rain or Shine, he only played 16 games, averaging 2.6 points on 35% shooting from threes. Rain or Shine then made him a free agent after that season with two seasons remaining in his contract.

=== TNT Tropang Giga ===
Shortly after Rain or Shine let him go, the TNT Tropang Giga picked up his contract. In his first conference with them, TNT made it to the 2020 Philippine Cup finals, where they lost to Barangay Ginebra. The following conference, the 2021 Philippine Cup, he contributed solid play in TNT's backcourt as they won the championship. He stepped up as a reserve during the 2022 Philippine Cup as TNT had several injuries during that conference. These included double-digit scoring performances in wins over the NorthPort Batang Pier and the Terrafirma Dyip as they won five straight games. In a win over Terrafirma during the 2022–23 Commissioner's Cup, he scored 17 points, making his first seven shots before missing his last shot in the final seconds of the blowout.

=== Phoenix Fuel Masters ===
On January 17, 2023, Alejandro was sent to the Phoenix Super LPG Fuel Masters in a three-team trade. The trade reunited him with Coach Jarin. In his first conference with Phoenix, he averaged 3.5 points in around 10 minutes.

In a win over NLEX during the 2023–24 Commissioner's Cup, Alejandro scored a PBA career-high 18 points, with 15 coming in the fourth quarter. He then followed it up with 15 points in a loss to the Magnolia Chicken Timplados Hotshots. Still Phoenix had a 6–1 record at this point of the conference. During the conference, he re-signed with Phoenix for two more seasons. Phoenix finished with the conference a record of 8–3 and a twice-to-beat advantage for the playoffs. They went on to make it to the semifinals, where they lost to Magnolia. However, in the following conference, the 2024 Philippine Cup, they were unable to replicate that success as they had a record of 3–8. That extended to the 2024–25 season, where they failed to make the playoffs in all three conferences and led to the replacement of Coach Jarin.

In December of 2025, Alejandro's contract expired and was not renewed. He then tried out for MPBL teams but did not make any opening day rosters. This led to him reuniting with Jarin, joining the Lyceum Pirates as an assistant coach under his former mentor.

== National team career ==
In 2011, Alejandro was the team captain of the Philippine under-16 team that finished fourth in the 2011 FIBA Asia U-16 Championship. One of his highlights of the tournament was when he scored 34 points with 10 rebounds and four assists in a win over Japan. He then led them to a sweep of the 2012 SEABA U-18 Championship and into the quarterfinals of the 2012 FIBA Asia U-18 Championship.

Alejandro was named to the "23-for-2023" pool, which was composed of young players for the 2023 FIBA World Cup. As part of the pool, he played for the Gilas Cadets during the 2018 Filoil Flying V Preseason Premier Cup. He was also part of the pool for the February 2022 window of the 2023 FIBA World Cup Asian Qualifiers.

== Personal life ==
Alejandro is married to Ella Pascua, who he dated for eight years and is also his business partner. They have a son. He and two of his former high school teammates own a branch of a sandwich shop. He once served as the Sangguniang Kabataan (SK) chairman of his barangay in Bagong Barrio, Caloocan City.

== Career statistics ==
=== College ===
==== Elimination rounds ====
Year	Team	GP	MPG	FG%	3P%	FT%	RPG	APG	SPG	BPG	PPG
2013–14	NU	14	6.6	.367	.333	.400	.8	.1	.4	.0	2.1
2014–15	NU	13	13.8	.326	.310	.500	1.6	1.1	.1	.0	3.0
2015–16	NU	14	17.2	.356	.250	.800	1.8	.4	.3	.0	7.2
2016–17	NU	14	27.8	.364	.224	.776	4.2	3.0	.9	.1	12.6
2017–18	NU	11	32.7	.391	.275	.780	6.4	6.7	1.3	.0	16.6
Career		66	19.1	.368	.265	.764	2.8	2.1	.5	.0	8.0

==== Playoffs ====
Year	Team	GP	MPG	FG%	3P%	FT%	RPG	APG	SPG	BPG	PPG
2013–14	NU	2	4.5	.000	.000	1.000	.0	.0	.0	.0	1.0
2014–15	NU	6	13.9	.560	.429	.750	1.3	1.2	.0	.3	6.7
2015–16	NU	1	22.8	.231	.000	1.000	5.0	2.0	.0	1.0	8.0
Career		9	12.8	.405	.261	.833	1.4	1.0	.0	.3	5.6
