= 2021 Phoenix Super LPG Fuel Masters season =

- Head coach: Topex Robinson
- Owner(s): Phoenix Petroleum Philippines, Inc.

Philippine Cup results
- Record: 4–7 (36.4%)
- Place: 9th
- Playoff finish: Did not qualify

Governors' Cup results
- Record: 5–6 (45.5%)
- Place: 8th
- Playoff finish: Quarterfinalist (lost to Magnolia with twice-to-win disadvantage)

Phoenix Super LPG Fuel Masters seasons

The 2021 Phoenix Super LPG Fuel Masters season was the 6th season of the franchise in the Philippine Basketball Association (PBA).

== Key dates ==
- March 14: The PBA season 46 draft was held at the TV5 Media Center in Mandaluyong.

== Draft picks ==
Round	Pick	Player	Position	Place of birth	College
1	7	Larry Muyang	Center	Philippines	La Salle
2	18	Nick Demusis	Forward	USA	Whittier
2	19	Aljun Melecio	Guard	Philippines	La Salle
3	34	Reymar Caduyac	Guard	Philippines	Lyceum
4	44	Max Hentschel	Forward	Philippines	UvA
5	52	Jerie Pingoy	Guard	Philippines	Adamson

== Roster ==
2021 Phoenix Super LPG Fuel Masters roster
Players
Coaches

Pos.	#	POB	Name	Height	Weight	DOB (YYYY–MM–DD)	From
C	1	(Philippines)	Larry Muyang (R)	6 ft 6 in (1.98 m)	220 lb (100 kg)	1995–06–04	Letran
F	2	(United States)	Sean Manganti	6 ft 5 in (1.96 m)		1994–04–18	Adamson
F	3	(United States)	Jason Perkins	6 ft 4 in (1.93 m)	235 lb (107 kg)	1992–09–20	De La Salle
G/F	7	(Canada)	Matthew Wright (C)	6 ft 4 in (1.93 m)	200 lb (91 kg)	1992–02–07	St. Bonaventure
G	8	(Philippines)	RR Garcia	5 ft 11 in (1.80 m)	165 lb (75 kg)	1990–01–12	Far Eastern
F	9	(Philippines)	Jake Pascual	6 ft 4 in (1.93 m)	200 lb (91 kg)	1988–11–11	San Beda
F	10	(Canada)	Sean Anthony	6 ft 4 in (1.93 m)	200 lb (91 kg)	1986–01–26	McGill
G	11	(Philippines)	Aljun Melecio (R)	5 ft 8 in (1.73 m)	160 lb (73 kg)	1998–07–25	De La Salle
G	13	(Philippines)	RJ Jazul	5 ft 11 in (1.80 m)	170 lb (77 kg)	1986–04–11	Letran
F	14	(Philippines)	Nick Demusis (R)	6 ft 4 in (1.93 m)	205 lb (93 kg)	1991–05–09	Whittier
F	20	(Philippines)	Simon Camacho	6 ft 5 in (1.96 m)			Adamson
F	24	(Philippines)	Nico Salva	6 ft 3 in (1.91 m)	194 lb (88 kg)	1990–03–08	Ateneo
G	25	(Philippines)	Alfrancis Tamsi	6 ft 1 in (1.85 m)	158 lb (72 kg)	1992–03–25	Far Eastern
F	28	(Philippines)	Jansen Rios	6 ft 3 in (1.91 m)	185 lb (84 kg)	1991–10–28	Adamson
G	30	(Philippines)	Billy Robles	6 ft 0 in (1.83 m)		1992–05–30	NISU
F/C	41	(Philippines)	Kris Porter	6 ft 5 in (1.96 m)	195 lb (88 kg)	1994–09–02	Ateneo

Head coach

- (Philippines) Topex Robinson

Assistant coach(es)

- (Philippines) Jamike Jarin (1st assistant)
- (Philippines) Jon Jacinto
- (Philippines) Kristofer Reyes
- (Philippines) Willy Wilson

Team manager

- (Philippines) Paolo Bugia

Legend

- (C) Team captain
- (CI) Commissioner's Cup Import
- (GI) Governors' Cup Import
- (EI) EASL Import
- (DP) Unsigned draft pick
- (FA) Free agent
- (IN) Inactive
- (S) Suspended
- (R) Rookie
- Injured

Roster

== Philippine Cup ==
=== Eliminations ===
==== Standings ====
Pos	Team	W	L	PCT	GB	Qualification
1	TNT Tropang Giga	10	1	.909	—	Twice-to-beat in the quarterfinals
2	Meralco Bolts	9	2	.818	1	Twice-to-beat in the quarterfinals
3	Magnolia Pambansang Manok Hotshots	8	3	.727	2	Best-of-three quarterfinals
4	San Miguel Beermen	7	4	.636	3	Best-of-three quarterfinals
5	NorthPort Batang Pier	6	5	.545 (Note: Head-to-head record: NorthPort 1–0 Rain or Shine)	4	Best-of-three quarterfinals
6	Rain or Shine Elasto Painters	6	5	.545	4	Best-of-three quarterfinals
7	NLEX Road Warriors	5	6	.455	5	Twice-to-win in the quarterfinals
8	Barangay Ginebra San Miguel	4	7	.364 (Note: Head-to-head quotient: Phoenix 1.03, Barangay Ginebra 1.01, Terrafirma 0.96; eighth seed playoff: Barangay Ginebra 95–85 Phoenix)	6	Twice-to-win in the quarterfinals
9	Phoenix Super LPG Fuel Masters	4	7	.364	6	
10	Terrafirma Dyip	4	7	.364	6	
11	Alaska Aces	3	8	.273	7	
12	Blackwater Bossing	0	11	.000	10	

Source: PBA.ph
Rules for classification: 1) winning percentage; 2) if two teams are tied, head-to-head record; if three or more teams are tied, head-to-head goal average (quotient), if tied for 8th, one-game playoff; 3) overall quotient 4) coin toss

==== Game log ====
2021 PBA Philippine Cup game log
Total: 4–7
July: 1–3

Game	Date	Opponent	Score	High points	High rebounds	High assists	Location Attendance	Record
1	July 17	Magnolia	L 73–80	Matthew Wright (20)	Jason Perkins (13)	Matthew Wright (8)	Ynares Sports Arena	0–1
2	July 21	NorthPort	L 79–115	Vic Manuel (26)	Chua, Perkins, Wright (7)	Aljun Melecio (4)	Ynares Sports Arena	0–2
3	July 24	Alaska	W 101–93	Vic Manuel (26)	Vic Manuel (12)	RR Garcia (5)	Ynares Sports Arena	1–2
4	July 28	Meralco	L 80–91	Matthew Wright (29)	Nick Demusis (6)	Jason Perkins (4)	Ynares Sports Arena	1–3

August : 0–1

Game	Date	Opponent	Score	High points	High rebounds	High assists	Location Attendance	Record
5	August 1	TNT	L 80–84	Matthew Wright (15)	Vic Manuel (9)	Chris Banchero (5)	Ynares Sports Arena	1–4

September : 3–3

Game	Date	Opponent	Score	High points	High rebounds	High assists	Location Attendance	Record
6	September 2	Rain or Shine	W 78–77	Garcia, Perkins (18)	Perkins, Wright (12)	Perkins, Wright (5)	DHVSU Gym	2–4
7	September 4	NLEX	L 76–94	Vic Manuel (13)	Jason Perkins (12)	Banchero, Wright (6)	DHVSU Gym	2–5
8	September 9	Terrafirma	W 96–84	Jason Perkins (28)	Nick Demusis (9)	RR Garcia (7)	DHVSU Gym	3–5
9	September 11	Blackwater	W 114–92	Chua, Perkins (17)	Justin Chua (9)	Garcia, Wright (6)	DHVSU Gym	4–5
10	September 15	Barangay Ginebra	L 87–94	Jason Perkins (30)	Chua, Perkins (8)	Chris Banchero (7)	DHVSU Gym	4–6
11	September 17	San Miguel	L 80–110	Jason Perkins (18)	Jason Perkins (9)	Matthew Wright (10)	DHVSU Gym	4–7

=== Playoffs ===
==== Bracket ====
Quarterfinals
(#1 twice-to-beat)
1	TNT	84
8	Barangay Ginebra	71
(Best-of-3)
4	San Miguel	2
5	NorthPort	0
(#2 twice-to-beat)
2	Meralco	80	97
7	NLEX	81	86
(Best-of-3)
3	Magnolia	2
6	Rain or Shine	0

Semifinals (Best-of-7)
1	TNT	4
4	San Miguel	3
2	Meralco	2
3	Magnolia	4

Finals (Best-of-7)
1	TNT	4
3	Magnolia	1

==== Game log ====
2021 PBA Philippine Cup playoffs game log
Total: 0–1
8th seed playoff: 0–1

Game	Date	Opponent	Score	High points	High rebounds	High assists	Location Attendance	Series
1	September 25	Barangay Ginebra	L 85–95	Jason Perkins (15)	Jake Pascual (11)	Matthew Wright (8)	DHVSU Gym	0–1

== Governors' Cup ==
=== Eliminations ===
==== Standings ====
Pos	Team	W	L	PCT	GB	Qualification
1	Magnolia Pambansang Manok Hotshots	9	2	.818	—	Twice-to-beat in quarterfinals
2	NLEX Road Warriors	8	3	.727	1	Twice-to-beat in quarterfinals
3	TNT Tropang Giga	7	4	.636 (Note: Head-to-head quotient: TNT 1.07, Meralco 0.99, San Miguel 0.95)	2	Twice-to-beat in quarterfinals
4	Meralco Bolts	7	4	.636	2	Twice-to-beat in quarterfinals
5	San Miguel Beermen	7	4	.636	2	Twice-to-win in quarterfinals
6	Barangay Ginebra San Miguel	6	5	.545 (Note: Head-to-head record: Barangay Ginebra 1–0 Alaska)	3	Twice-to-win in quarterfinals
7	Alaska Aces	6	5	.545	3	Twice-to-win in quarterfinals
8	Phoenix Super LPG Fuel Masters	5	6	.455 (Note: Eighth seed playoff: Phoenix 101–98 NorthPort)	4	Twice-to-win in quarterfinals
9	NorthPort Batang Pier	5	6	.455	4	
10	Rain or Shine Elasto Painters	3	8	.273	6	
11	Terrafirma Dyip	2	9	.182	7	
12	Blackwater Bossing	1	10	.091	8	

Source: PBA.ph
Rules for classification: 1) winning percentage; 2) if two teams are tied, head-to-head record; if three or more teams are tied, head-to-head goal average (quotient), if tied for 8th, one-game playoff; 3) overall quotient 4) coin toss

==== Game log ====
2021 PBA Governors' Cup game log
Total: 5–6
December: 3–2

Game	Date	Opponent	Score	High points	High rebounds	High assists	Location Attendance	Record
1	December 9	Terrafirma	W 103–100	Paul Harris (24)	Paul Harris (15)	Matthew Wright (10)	Ynares Sports Arena	1–0
2	December 11	Blackwater	W 110–99	Chris Banchero (23)	Paul Harris (16)	Matthew Wright (9)	Ynares Sports Arena	2–0
3	December 16	Rain or Shine	L 88–90	Paul Harris (17)	Paul Harris (20)	Paul Harris (6)	Smart Araneta Coliseum	2–1
4	December 19	Barangay Ginebra	L 121–125 (OT)	Paul Harris (26)	Nick Demusis (9)	Matthew Wright (8)	Smart Araneta Coliseum	2–2
5	December 25	NLEX	W 102–93	Matthew Wright (23)	Matthew Wright (9)	Jazul, Perkins, Wright (4)	Smart Araneta Coliseum; 4,843	3–2

February : 1–3

Game	Date	Opponent	Score	High points	High rebounds	High assists	Location Attendance	Record
6	February 13, 2022	TNT	W 93–92	Matthew Wright (27)	Dominique Sutton (10)	Matthew Wright (10)	Smart Araneta Coliseum	4–2
7	February 19, 2022	Magnolia	L 83–103	Matthew Wright (18)	Sean Manganti (9)	Matthew Wright (6)	Smart Araneta Coliseum	4–3
8	February 23, 2022	San Miguel	L 99–104	Matthew Wright (24)	Jake Pascual (11)	Matthew Wright (7)	Ynares Center	4–4
9	February 26, 2022	NorthPort	L 93–101	Dominique Sutton (23)	Dominique Sutton (12)	Matthew Wright (6)	Ynares Center	4–5

March : 1–1

Game	Date	Opponent	Score	High points	High rebounds	High assists	Location Attendance	Record
10	March 3, 2022	Alaska	W 104–99	Matthew Wright (26)	Du'Vaughn Maxwell (21)	Matthew Wright (11)	Smart Araneta Coliseum	5–5
11	March 11, 2022	Meralco	L 90–109	Du'Vaughn Maxwell (26)	Du'Vaughn Maxwell (12)	Matthew Wright (10)	Smart Araneta Coliseum	5–6

=== Playoffs ===
==== Bracket ====
Quarterfinals (Top 4 twice-to-beat)
1	Magnolia	127
8	Phoenix Super LPG	88
4	Meralco	100
5	San Miguel	85
2	NLEX	79	96
7	Alaska	93	80
3	TNT	92	95
6	Barangay Ginebra	104	115

Semifinals (Best-of-5)
1	Magnolia	2
4	Meralco	3
2	NLEX	1
6	Barangay Ginebra	3

Finals (Best-of-7)
4	Meralco	2
6	Barangay Ginebra	4

==== Game log ====
2021 PBA Governors' Cup playoffs game log
Total: 1–0
8th seed playoff: 1–0

Game	Date	Opponent	Score	High points	High rebounds	High assists	Location Attendance	Series
1	March 13, 2022	NorthPort	W 101–98	Du'Vaughn Maxwell (31)	Du'Vaughn Maxwell (13)	Maxwell, Wright (5)	Smart Araneta Coliseum	1–0

Quarterfinals: 0–1

Game	Date	Opponent	Score	High points	High rebounds	High assists	Location Attendance	Series
1	March 18, 2022	Magnolia	L 88–127	Du'Vaughn Maxwell (32)	Maxwell, Perkins (9)	Matthew Wright (8)	Smart Araneta Coliseum	0–1

== Transactions ==
=== Free agency ===
==== Signings ====
Player	Date signed	Contract amount	Contract length	Former team
Michael Calisaan	July 15, 2021	Not disclosed	One-year	Magnolia Pambansang Manok Hotshots
Bryan Faundo	July 15, 2021	Not disclosed	Not disclosed	Meralco Bolts
Alfrancis Tamsi	July 20, 2021	Not disclosed	Not disclosed	KCS Computer Specialist (VisMin)
Nico Salva	November 12, 2021	Not disclosed	One-conference	Meralco Bolts
Simon Camacho	November 26, 2021	Not disclosed	Not disclosed	Bacolod Masters (MPBL)
Billy Robles	February 9, 2022	Not disclosed	Not disclosed	Davao Occidental Tigers (MPBL)

=== Trades ===
==== Pre-season ====
February
February 17, 2021	To Phoenix Super LPG Chris Banchero; 2020 Magnolia first-round pick (No. 6); 2020 Magnolia second-round pick (No. 18)	To Magnolia Calvin Abueva; 2020 Phoenix first-round pick (No. 10)
February 23, 2021	To Phoenix Super LPG Vic Manuel; 2020 Alaska first-round pick (No. 7); 2020 Alaska second-round pick (No. 19)	To Alaska Brian Heruela; 2020 Magnolia first-round pick (No. 6); 2020 NLEX second-round pick (No. 16); 2021 Phoenix first-round pick

==== Mid-season ====
November
November 5, 2021	To Phoenix Super LPG Sean Anthony; Sean Manganti; 2021 TNT second-round pick	To NorthPort Michael Calisaan; Vic Manuel

==== Governors' Cup ====
February
February 24, 2022	To Phoenix Super LPG Kris Porter; Season 47 2nd round pick Season 48 1st round pick	To NLEX Justin Chua

=== Recruited imports ===
Tournament	Name	Debuted	Last game	Record
Governors' Cup	Paul Harris	December 9, 2021 (vs. Terrafirma)	December 25, 2021 (vs. NLEX)	3–2
Governors' Cup	Dominique Sutton	February 13, 2022 (vs. TNT)	February 26, 2022 (vs. NorthPort)	1–3
Governors' Cup	Du'Vaughn Maxwell	March 3, 2022 (vs. Alaska)	March 18, 2022 (vs. Magnolia)	2–2
