= 2021 Alaska Aces season =

- Head coach: Jeffrey Cariaso
- General Manager: Dickie Bachmann
- Owner(s): Alaska Milk Corporation

Philippine Cup results
- Record: 3–8 (27.3%)
- Place: 11th
- Playoff finish: Did not qualify

Governors' Cup results
- Record: 6–5 (54.5%)
- Place: 7th
- Playoff finish: Quarterfinalist (lost to NLEX with twice-to-win disadvantage)

Alaska Aces seasons

The 2021 Alaska Aces season was the 35th season of the franchise in the Philippine Basketball Association (PBA). It was also the team's final season in the league, as they announced on February 16, 2022, that they would leave the league after the 2021 Governor's Cup.

== Key dates ==
- March 14: The PBA season 46 draft was held at the TV5 Media Center in Mandaluyong.

== Draft picks ==
Round	Pick	Player	Position	Place of birth	College
1	6	Ben Adamos	C/F	Philippines	Perpetual
2	16	Taylor Browne	G/F	Canada	UBC
2	21	Alec Stockton	G	USA	FEU
3	31	RK Ilagan	G	Philippines	San Sebastian

== Roster ==
2021 Alaska Aces roster
Players
Coaches

Pos.	#	POB	Name	Height	Weight	DOB (YYYY–MM–DD)	From
G	0	(Philippines)	RK Ilagan (R)	5 ft 7 in (1.70 m)	150 lb (68 kg)	1997–04–03	San Sebastian
G/F	1	(United States)	Robbie Herndon	6 ft 3 in (1.91 m)	180 lb (82 kg)	1993–07–16	San Francisco State
F/C	2	(Philippines)	Abu Tratter	6 ft 5 in (1.96 m)	215 lb (98 kg)	1993–01–09	De La Salle
G	3	(United States)	Michael DiGregorio	6 ft 1 in (1.85 m)	185 lb (84 kg)	1991–12–12	McKendree
G/F	5	(Canada)	Taylor Browne (R)	6 ft 3 in (1.91 m)	185 lb (84 kg)	1997–01–30	UBC
G	12	(United States)	Alec Stockton (R)	6 ft 2 in (1.88 m)	170 lb (77 kg)	1998–06–24	Far Eastern
G	13	(United States)	Maverick Ahanmisi	6 ft 2 in (1.88 m)	185 lb (84 kg)	1991–07–17	Minnesota
F/C	18	(Philippines)	Ben Adamos (R)	6 ft 7 in (2.01 m)	200 lb (91 kg)	1995–12–30	UPHSD
G	19	(Philippines)	Jaycee Marcelino	5 ft 9 in (1.75 m)		1995–10–19	Lyceum
G/F	21	(Philippines)	Jeron Teng (C)	6 ft 2 in (1.88 m)	185 lb (84 kg)	1994–03–21	De La Salle
G	24	(Philippines)	Mike Tolomia	5 ft 11 in (1.80 m)	170 lb (77 kg)	1993–01–06	Far Eastern
G	28	(Philippines)	Allyn Bulanadi (R)	6 ft 0 in (1.83 m)		1997–04–28	San Sebastian
F	31	(Philippines)	Rey Publico	6 ft 4 in (1.93 m)		1992–11–29	Letran
C	55	(Palestine)	Yousef Taha	6 ft 8 in (2.03 m)	231 lb (105 kg)	1988–07–08	Mapúa
F	61	(Philippines)	Kevin Racal	6 ft 3 in (1.91 m)	175 lb (79 kg)	1991–05–16	Letran
F/C	96	(Philippines)	Bryan Faundo	6 ft 6 in (1.98 m)	225 lb (102 kg)	1984–02–18	Letran

Head coach

- (United States) Jeffrey Cariaso

Assistant coach(es)

- (Philippines) Joe Silva (1st assistant)
- (Philippines) Danny Ildefonso
- (Philippines) Franco Atienza
- (Philippines) Monch Gavieres

Team manager

- (Philippines) Richard Bachmann^{[a]}

Legend

- (C) Team captain
- (CI) Commissioner's Cup Import
- (GI) Governors' Cup Import
- (EI) EASL Import
- (DP) Unsigned draft pick
- (FA) Free agent
- (IN) Inactive
- (S) Suspended
- (R) Rookie
- Injured

Roster

- ^{a} also served as Alaska's board governor.

== Philippine Cup ==
=== Eliminations ===
==== Standings ====
Pos	Team	W	L	PCT	GB	Qualification
1	TNT Tropang Giga	10	1	.909	—	Twice-to-beat in the quarterfinals
2	Meralco Bolts	9	2	.818	1	Twice-to-beat in the quarterfinals
3	Magnolia Pambansang Manok Hotshots	8	3	.727	2	Best-of-three quarterfinals
4	San Miguel Beermen	7	4	.636	3	Best-of-three quarterfinals
5	NorthPort Batang Pier	6	5	.545 (Note: Head-to-head record: NorthPort 1–0 Rain or Shine)	4	Best-of-three quarterfinals
6	Rain or Shine Elasto Painters	6	5	.545	4	Best-of-three quarterfinals
7	NLEX Road Warriors	5	6	.455	5	Twice-to-win in the quarterfinals
8	Barangay Ginebra San Miguel	4	7	.364 (Note: Head-to-head quotient: Phoenix 1.03, Barangay Ginebra 1.01, Terrafirma 0.96; eighth seed playoff: Barangay Ginebra 95–85 Phoenix)	6	Twice-to-win in the quarterfinals
9	Phoenix Super LPG Fuel Masters	4	7	.364	6	
10	Terrafirma Dyip	4	7	.364	6	
11	Alaska Aces	3	8	.273	7	
12	Blackwater Bossing	0	11	.000	10	

Source: PBA.ph
Rules for classification: 1) winning percentage; 2) if two teams are tied, head-to-head record; if three or more teams are tied, head-to-head goal average (quotient), if tied for 8th, one-game playoff; 3) overall quotient 4) coin toss

==== Game log ====
2021 PBA Philippine Cup game log
Total: 3–8
July: 2–3

Game	Date	Opponent	Score	High points	High rebounds	High assists	Location Attendance	Record
1	July 16	Blackwater	W 103–77	Michael DiGregorio (20)	Rodney Brondial (10)	JVee Casio (7)	Ynares Sports Arena	1–0
2	July 21	Magnolia	L 82–84	Yousef Taha (20)	Jeron Teng (12)	Ahanmisi, DiGregorio, Teng (3)	Ynares Sports Arena	1–1
3	July 24	Phoenix Super LPG	L 93–101	Gab Banal (17)	Yousef Taha (12)	Michael DiGregorio (4)	Ynares Sports Arena	1–2
4	July 28	Rain or Shine	W 74–48	Rodney Brondial (13)	Abu Tratter (13)	Maverick Ahanmisi (4)	Ynares Sports Arena	2–2
5	July 31	Meralco	L 80–89	Gab Banal (20)	Yousef Taha (9)	Jeron Teng (5)	Ynares Sports Arena	2–3

September: 1–5

Game	Date	Opponent	Score	High points	High rebounds	High assists	Location Attendance	Record
6	September 2	NLEX	L 74–84	Maverick Ahanmisi (17)	Rodney Brondial (10)	Jeron Teng (3)	DHVSU Gym	2–4
7	September 17	Barangay Ginebra	W 89–75	Abu Tratter (13)	Rodney Brondial (10)	Ahamnisi, Marcelino (3)	DHVSU Gym	3–4
8	September 18	TNT	L 85–103	Abu Tratter (12)	Brondial, Tratter (9)	Alec Stockton (4)	DHVSU Gym	3–5
9	September 19	Terrafirma	L 89–105	Abu Tratter (18)	Rodney Brondial (14)	JVee Casio (6)	DHVSU Gym	3–6
10	September 22	San Miguel	L 100–101	Abu Tratter (24)	Rodney Brondial (12)	JVee Casio (4)	DHVSU Gym	3–7
11	September 23	NorthPort	L 94–122	Jeron Teng (18)	Brondial, Tratter (8)	Adamos, Casio (3)	DHVSU Gym	3–8

== Governors' Cup ==
=== Eliminations ===
==== Standings ====
Pos	Team	W	L	PCT	GB	Qualification
1	Magnolia Pambansang Manok Hotshots	9	2	.818	—	Twice-to-beat in quarterfinals
2	NLEX Road Warriors	8	3	.727	1	Twice-to-beat in quarterfinals
3	TNT Tropang Giga	7	4	.636 (Note: Head-to-head quotient: TNT 1.07, Meralco 0.99, San Miguel 0.95)	2	Twice-to-beat in quarterfinals
4	Meralco Bolts	7	4	.636	2	Twice-to-beat in quarterfinals
5	San Miguel Beermen	7	4	.636	2	Twice-to-win in quarterfinals
6	Barangay Ginebra San Miguel	6	5	.545 (Note: Head-to-head record: Barangay Ginebra 1–0 Alaska)	3	Twice-to-win in quarterfinals
7	Alaska Aces	6	5	.545	3	Twice-to-win in quarterfinals
8	Phoenix Super LPG Fuel Masters	5	6	.455 (Note: Eighth seed playoff: Phoenix 101–98 NorthPort)	4	Twice-to-win in quarterfinals
9	NorthPort Batang Pier	5	6	.455	4	
10	Rain or Shine Elasto Painters	3	8	.273	6	
11	Terrafirma Dyip	2	9	.182	7	
12	Blackwater Bossing	1	10	.091	8	

Source: PBA.ph
Rules for classification: 1) winning percentage; 2) if two teams are tied, head-to-head record; if three or more teams are tied, head-to-head goal average (quotient), if tied for 8th, one-game playoff; 3) overall quotient 4) coin toss

==== Game log ====
2021 PBA Governors' Cup game log
Total: 6–5
December: 3–2

Game	Date	Opponent	Score	High points	High rebounds	High assists	Location Attendance	Record
1	December 8	NorthPort	W 87–85	Olu Ashaolu (20)	Olu Ashaolu (14)	Maverick Ahanmisi (5)	Ynares Sports Arena	1–0
2	December 10	San Miguel	W 99–94	Olu Ashaolu (23)	Olu Ashaolu (13)	Maverick Ahanmisi (6)	Ynares Sports Arena	2–0
3	December 12	Barangay Ginebra	L 77–80	Olu Ashaolu (17)	Olu Ashaolu (18)	Jeron Teng (4)	Ynares Sports Arena	2–1
4	December 17	TNT	L 77–81	Olu Ashaolu (29)	Olu Ashaolu (18)	Jeron Teng (4)	Smart Araneta Coliseum	2–2
5	December 22	Blackwater	W 98–75	Maverick Ahanmisi (17)	Abu Tratter (11)	Robbie Herndon (4)	Smart Araneta Coliseum	3–2

February: 3–1

Game	Date	Opponent	Score	High points	High rebounds	High assists	Location Attendance	Record
6	February 17, 2022	Rain or Shine	W 80–74	Olu Ashaolu (23)	Olu Ashaolu (17)	Olu Ashaolu (4)	Smart Araneta Coliseum	4–2
7	February 19, 2022	Terrafirma	W 102–97	Jeron Teng (30)	Olu Ashaolu (19)	Olu Ashaolu (6)	Smart Araneta Coliseum	5–2
8	February 23, 2022	NLEX	L 89–106	Abu Tratter (17)	Maverick Ahanmisi (12)	Olu Ashaolu (6)	Ynares Center	5–3
9	February 26, 2022	Meralco	W 94–93	Ashaolu, DiGregorio (21)	Olu Ashaolu (9)	Maverick Ahanmisi (10)	Ynares Center	6–3

March: 0–2

Game	Date	Opponent	Score	High points	High rebounds	High assists	Location Attendance	Record
10	March 3, 2022	Phoenix Super LPG	L 99–104	Olu Ashaolu (24)	Olu Ashaolu (10)	Olu Ashaolu (6)	Smart Araneta Coliseum	6–4
11	March 6, 2022	Magnolia	L 91–118	RK Ilagan (14)	Olu Ashaolu (10)	Abu Tratter (5)	Smart Araneta Coliseum; 6,502	6–5

=== Playoffs ===
==== Bracket ====
Quarterfinals (Top 4 twice-to-beat)
1	Magnolia	127
8	Phoenix Super LPG	88
4	Meralco	100
5	San Miguel	85
2	NLEX	79	96
7	Alaska	93	80
3	TNT	92	95
6	Barangay Ginebra	104	115

Semifinals (Best-of-5)
1	Magnolia	2
4	Meralco	3
2	NLEX	1
6	Barangay Ginebra	3

Finals (Best-of-7)
4	Meralco	2
6	Barangay Ginebra	4

==== Game log ====
2021 PBA Governors' Cup playoffs game log
Total: 1–1
Quarterfinals: 1–1

Game	Date	Opponent	Score	High points	High rebounds	High assists	Location Attendance	Series
1	March 16, 2022	NLEX	W 93–79	Mark St. Fort (17)	Mark St. Fort (14)	Ahanmisi, Ilagan, Teng (3)	Smart Araneta Coliseum; 7,091	1–0
2	March 19, 2022	NLEX	L 80–96	Mark St. Fort (14)	Mark St. Fort (7)	Ahanmisi, Ilagan, St. Fort (3)	Smart Araneta Coliseum; 10,486	1–1

== Transactions ==
=== Free agency ===
==== Subtraction ====
Player	Number	Position	Reason	New team
Gab Banal	77	Forward	End of contract; did not agree to term extension	TNT Tropang Giga
Rodney Brondial	91	Forward / center	End of contract; did not agree to term extension	San Miguel Beermen

=== Trades ===
==== Pre-season ====
February
February 23, 2021	To Alaska Brian Heruela; 2020 Magnolia first-round pick (No. 6); 2020 NLEX second-round pick (No. 16); 2021 Phoenix first-round pick	To Phoenix Vic Manuel; 2020 Alaska first-round pick (No. 7); 2020 Alaska second-round pick (No. 19)

==== Philippine Cup ====
October
October 12, 2021	To Alaska Mike Tolomia; 2022 Blackwater second-round pick	To Blackwater JVee Casio; Barkley Eboña

=== Recruited imports ===
Tournament	Name	Debuted	Last game	Record
Governors' Cup	Olu Ashaolu	December 8, 2021 (vs. NorthPort)	March 6, 2022 (vs. Magnolia)	6–5
Governors' Cup	Mark St. Fort	March 16, 2022 (vs. NLEX)	March 19, 2022 (vs. NLEX)	1–1
