= 2021 Barangay Ginebra San Miguel season =

- Head coach: Tim Cone
- Owner(s): Ginebra San Miguel, Inc. (a San Miguel Corporation subsidiary)

Philippine Cup results
- Record: 4–7 (36.4%)
- Place: 8th
- Playoff finish: Quarterfinalist (lost to TNT with twice-to-win disadvantage)

Governors' Cup results
- Record: 6–5 (54.5%)
- Place: 6th
- Playoff finish: Champions (Defeated Meralco, 4–2)

Barangay Ginebra San Miguel seasons

The 2021 Barangay Ginebra San Miguel season was the 42nd season of the franchise in the Philippine Basketball Association (PBA).

== Key dates ==
- March 14: The PBA season 46 draft was held at the TV5 Media Center in Mandaluyong.

== Draft picks ==
Round	Pick	Player	Position	Place of birth	College
1	12	Ken Holmqvist	C	Philippines	FEU
2	13	Brian Enriquez	G/F	USA	William Woods

== Roster ==
2021 Barangay Ginebra San Miguel roster
Players
Coaches

Pos.	#	POB	Name	Height	Weight	DOB (YYYY–MM–DD)	From
F	2	(United States)	Jared Dillinger (injured)	6 ft 4 in (1.93 m)	220 lb (100 kg)	1984–01–06	Hawaiʻi
G	3	(Philippines)	Kent Salado	5 ft 9 in (1.75 m)		1994–11–10	Arellano
G	5	(Philippines)	LA Tenorio	5 ft 8 in (1.73 m)	151 lb (68 kg)	1984–07–09	Ateneo
G	6	(Philippines)	Scottie Thompson	6 ft 1 in (1.85 m)	180 lb (82 kg)	1993–07–12	UPHSD
F	10	(Philippines)	Arvin Tolentino	6 ft 5 in (1.96 m)	210 lb (95 kg)	1995–11–05	Far Eastern
G	11	(United States)	Stanley Pringle (injured)	6 ft 1 in (1.85 m)	190 lb (86 kg)	1987–03–05	Penn State
F/C	12	(Philippines)	Prince Caperal	6 ft 7 in (2.01 m)	230 lb (104 kg)	1993–06–12	Arellano
G/F	14	(United States)	Brian Enriquez (R)	6 ft 3 in (1.91 m)	200 lb (91 kg)	1995–10–19	William Woods
G/F	16	(Philippines)	Jeff Chan	6 ft 2 in (1.88 m)	185 lb (84 kg)	1983–02–11	Far Eastern
G	17	(Philippines)	John Pinto	5 ft 11 in (1.80 m)	170 lb (77 kg)	1990–10–15	Arellano
F/C	23	(Philippines)	Raymond Aguilar	6 ft 4 in (1.93 m)	200 lb (91 kg)	1985–07–27	National-U
C	25	(Philippines)	Japeth Aguilar	6 ft 9 in (2.06 m)	235 lb (107 kg)	1987–01–25	Western Kentucky
F	27	(Philippines)	Sidney Onwubere	6 ft 4 in (1.93 m)		1993–08–01	Emilio Aguinaldo
F	31	(Philippines)	Aljon Mariano	6 ft 3 in (1.91 m)	175 lb (79 kg)	1992–08–03	UST
F/C	34	(Germany)	Christian Standhardinger	6 ft 8 in (2.03 m)	220 lb (100 kg)	1989–07–04	Hawaiʻi
F	38	(United States)	Joe Devance	6 ft 7 in (2.01 m)	225 lb (102 kg)	1982–02–19	UTEP
G	47	(Philippines)	Mark Caguioa (injured)	6 ft 2 in (1.88 m)	185 lb (84 kg)	1979–11–19	Glendale CC (CA)
G/F	50	(Philippines)	MJ Ayaay	6 ft 1 in (1.85 m)		1993–08–03	Lyceum
F	32	(United States)	Justin Brownlee (GI)	6 ft 6 in (1.98 m)	220 lb (100 kg)	1988–04–23	St. John's

Head coach

- (United States) Tim Cone

Assistant coach(es)

- (Philippines) Richard del Rosario (1st assistant)
- (Philippines) Freddie Abuda
- (United States) Kirk Collier
- (Philippines) Olsen Racela

Team manager

- (Philippines) Alfrancis Chua^{[a]}
- (Philippines) Raymond Rodriguez (Assistant)

Legend

- (C) Team captain
- (CI) Commissioner's Cup Import
- (GI) Governors' Cup Import
- (EI) EASL Import
- (DP) Unsigned draft pick
- (FA) Free agent
- (IN) Inactive
- (S) Suspended
- (R) Rookie
- Injured

Roster

- ^{a} Also serves as Barangay Ginebra's board governor.

== Philippine Cup ==
=== Eliminations ===
==== Standings ====
Pos	Team	W	L	PCT	GB	Qualification
1	TNT Tropang Giga	10	1	.909	—	Twice-to-beat in the quarterfinals
2	Meralco Bolts	9	2	.818	1	Twice-to-beat in the quarterfinals
3	Magnolia Pambansang Manok Hotshots	8	3	.727	2	Best-of-three quarterfinals
4	San Miguel Beermen	7	4	.636	3	Best-of-three quarterfinals
5	NorthPort Batang Pier	6	5	.545 (Note: Head-to-head record: NorthPort 1–0 Rain or Shine)	4	Best-of-three quarterfinals
6	Rain or Shine Elasto Painters	6	5	.545	4	Best-of-three quarterfinals
7	NLEX Road Warriors	5	6	.455	5	Twice-to-win in the quarterfinals
8	Barangay Ginebra San Miguel	4	7	.364 (Note: Head-to-head quotient: Phoenix 1.03, Barangay Ginebra 1.01, Terrafirma 0.96; eighth seed playoff: Barangay Ginebra 95–85 Phoenix)	6	Twice-to-win in the quarterfinals
9	Phoenix Super LPG Fuel Masters	4	7	.364	6	
10	Terrafirma Dyip	4	7	.364	6	
11	Alaska Aces	3	8	.273	7	
12	Blackwater Bossing	0	11	.000	10	

Source: PBA.ph
Rules for classification: 1) winning percentage; 2) if two teams are tied, head-to-head record; if three or more teams are tied, head-to-head goal average (quotient), if tied for 8th, one-game playoff; 3) overall quotient 4) coin toss

==== Game log ====
2021 PBA Philippine Cup game log
Total: 4–7
July: 2–2

Game	Date	Opponent	Score	High points	High rebounds	High assists	Location Attendance	Record
1	July 18	NLEX	L 75–94	Japeth Aguilar (15)	Scottie Thompson (12)	Scottie Thompson (9)	Ynares Sports Arena	0–1
2	July 23	Blackwater	W 96–81	Stanley Pringle (19)	Christian Standhardinger (19)	LA Tenorio (7)	Ynares Sports Arena	1–1
3	July 25	Magnolia	L 79–89	Stanley Pringle (22)	Scottie Thompson (12)	Stanley Pringle (6)	Ynares Sports Arena	1–2
4	July 30	NorthPort	W 87–85	Stanley Pringle (24)	Christian Standhardinger (12)	LA Tenorio (7)	Ynares Sports Arena	2–2

September: 2–5

Game	Date	Opponent	Score	High points	High rebounds	High assists	Location Attendance	Record
5	September 3	Terrafirma	L 90–95	Christian Standhardinger (17)	Mariano, Standhardinger (8)	Scottie Thompson (6)	DHVSU Gym	2–3
6	September 8	Rain or Shine	W 83–77	Christian Standhardinger (16)	Japeth Aguilar (11)	Scottie Thompson (6)	DHVSU Gym	3–3
7	September 10	San Miguel	L 102–111	LA Tenorio (19)	Aguilar, Thompson (8)	LA Tenorio (11)	DHVSU Gym	3–4
8	September 12	TNT	L 67–88	Japeth Aguilar (18)	Christian Standhardinger (9)	Pringle, Tenorio (5)	DHVSU Gym	3–5
9	September 15	Phoenix Super LPG	W 94–87	Stanley Pringle (31)	Christian Standhardinger (12)	LA Tenorio (5)	DHVSU Gym	4–5
10	September 17	Alaska	L 75–89	Stanley Pringle (20)	Scottie Thompson (12)	Mariano, Pringle (4)	DHVSU Gym	4–6
11	September 23	Meralco	L 66–79	Stanley Pringle (19)	Christian Standhardinger (14)	Christian Standhardinger (4)	DHVSU Gym	4–7

=== Playoffs ===
==== Bracket ====
Quarterfinals
(#1 twice-to-beat)
1	TNT	84
8	Barangay Ginebra	71
(Best-of-3)
4	San Miguel	2
5	NorthPort	0
(#2 twice-to-beat)
2	Meralco	80	97
7	NLEX	81	86
(Best-of-3)
3	Magnolia	2
6	Rain or Shine	0

Semifinals (Best-of-7)
1	TNT	4
4	San Miguel	3
2	Meralco	2
3	Magnolia	4

Finals (Best-of-7)
1	TNT	4
3	Magnolia	1

==== Game log ====
2021 PBA Philippine Cup playoffs game log
Total: 1–1
8th seed playoff: 1–0

Game	Date	Opponent	Score	High points	High rebounds	High assists	Location Attendance	Series
1	September 25	Phoenix Super LPG	W 95–85	Prince Caperal (19)	Christian Standhardinger (12)	Pringle, Tenorio (4)	DHVSU Gym	1–0

Quarterfinals: 0–1

Game	Date	Opponent	Score	High points	High rebounds	High assists	Location Attendance	Series
1	September 29	TNT	L 71–84	Christian Standhardinger (17)	Christian Standhardinger (19)	Caperal, Pringle, Tenorio (3)	DHVSU Gym	0–1

== Governors' Cup ==
=== Eliminations ===
==== Standings ====
Pos	Team	W	L	PCT	GB	Qualification
1	Magnolia Pambansang Manok Hotshots	9	2	.818	—	Twice-to-beat in quarterfinals
2	NLEX Road Warriors	8	3	.727	1	Twice-to-beat in quarterfinals
3	TNT Tropang Giga	7	4	.636 (Note: Head-to-head quotient: TNT 1.07, Meralco 0.99, San Miguel 0.95)	2	Twice-to-beat in quarterfinals
4	Meralco Bolts	7	4	.636	2	Twice-to-beat in quarterfinals
5	San Miguel Beermen	7	4	.636	2	Twice-to-win in quarterfinals
6	Barangay Ginebra San Miguel	6	5	.545 (Note: Head-to-head record: Barangay Ginebra 1–0 Alaska)	3	Twice-to-win in quarterfinals
7	Alaska Aces	6	5	.545	3	Twice-to-win in quarterfinals
8	Phoenix Super LPG Fuel Masters	5	6	.455 (Note: Eighth seed playoff: Phoenix 101–98 NorthPort)	4	Twice-to-win in quarterfinals
9	NorthPort Batang Pier	5	6	.455	4	
10	Rain or Shine Elasto Painters	3	8	.273	6	
11	Terrafirma Dyip	2	9	.182	7	
12	Blackwater Bossing	1	10	.091	8	

Source: PBA.ph
Rules for classification: 1) winning percentage; 2) if two teams are tied, head-to-head record; if three or more teams are tied, head-to-head goal average (quotient), if tied for 8th, one-game playoff; 3) overall quotient 4) coin toss

==== Game log ====
2021 PBA Governors' Cup game log
Total: 6–5
December: 3–1

Game	Date	Opponent	Score	High points	High rebounds	High assists	Location Attendance	Record
1	December 12	Alaska	W 80–77	Justin Brownlee (28)	Justin Brownlee (10)	Brownlee, Standhardinger (4)	Ynares Sports Arena	1–0
2	December 17	NorthPort	W 108–82	Justin Brownlee (28)	Justin Brownlee (9)	Standhardinger, Thompson (8)	Smart Araneta Coliseum	2–0
3	December 19	Phoenix Super LPG	W 125–121 (OT)	Justin Brownlee (31)	Japeth Aguilar (11)	LA Tenorio (9)	Smart Araneta Coliseum	3–0
4	December 25	Magnolia	L 94–117	Justin Brownlee (21)	Justin Brownlee (12)	Tenorio, Thompson (5)	Smart Araneta Coliseum; 4,843	3–1

February: 2–3

Game	Date	Opponent	Score	High points	High rebounds	High assists	Location Attendance	Record
5	February 13, 2022	Meralco	L 95–101	Justin Brownlee (27)	Justin Brownlee (14)	John Pinto (9)	Smart Araneta Coliseum	3–2
6	February 18, 2022	TNT	L 92–119	Justin Brownlee (25)	Justin Brownlee (9)	Scottie Thompson (7)	Smart Araneta Coliseum	3–3
7	February 20, 2022	San Miguel	L 102–110	Justin Brownlee (40)	Christian Standhardinger (17)	Christian Standhardinger (8)	Smart Araneta Coliseum; 3,347	3–4
8	February 25, 2022	Blackwater	W 109–100	Justin Brownlee (25)	Scottie Thompson (9)	LA Tenorio (9)	Ynares Center	4–4
9	February 27, 2022	Terrafirma	W 112–107	Justin Brownlee (29)	Justin Brownlee (15)	Scottie Thompson (11)	Ynares Center; 3,561	5–4

March: 1–1

Game	Date	Opponent	Score	High points	High rebounds	High assists	Location Attendance	Record
10	March 4, 2022	NLEX	L 103–115	Justin Brownlee (36)	Scottie Thompson (17)	Justin Brownlee (11)	Smart Araneta Coliseum	5–5
11	March 6, 2022	Rain or Shine	W 104–93	Justin Brownlee (25)	Scottie Thompson (12)	LA Tenorio (8)	Smart Araneta Coliseum; 6,502	6–5

=== Playoffs ===
==== Bracket ====
Quarterfinals (Top 4 twice-to-beat)
1	Magnolia	127
8	Phoenix Super LPG	88
4	Meralco	100
5	San Miguel	85
2	NLEX	79	96
7	Alaska	93	80
3	TNT	92	95
6	Barangay Ginebra	104	115

Semifinals (Best-of-5)
1	Magnolia	2
4	Meralco	3
2	NLEX	1
6	Barangay Ginebra	3

Finals (Best-of-7)
4	Meralco	2
6	Barangay Ginebra	4

==== Game log ====
2021 PBA Governors' playoffs game log
Total: 9–3
Quarterfinals: 2–0

Game	Date	Opponent	Score	High points	High rebounds	High assists	Location Attendance	Series
1	March 16, 2022	TNT	W 104–92	Justin Brownlee (38)	Scottie Thompson (15)	Scottie Thompson (8)	Smart Araneta Coliseum; 7,091	1–0
2	March 19, 2022	TNT	W 115–95	Justin Brownlee (29)	Justin Brownlee (18)	Scottie Thompson (9)	Smart Araneta Coliseum; 10,486	2–0

Semifinals: 3–1

Game	Date	Opponent	Score	High points	High rebounds	High assists	Location Attendance	Series
1	March 23, 2022	NLEX	W 95–86	Justin Brownlee (27)	Justin Brownlee (14)	Brownlee, Tenorio (6)	SM Mall of Asia Arena	1–0
2	March 25, 2022	NLEX	W 104–94	Justin Brownlee (32)	Scottie Thompson (12)	LA Tenorio (7)	SM Mall of Asia Arena	2–0
3	March 27, 2022	NLEX	L 85–86	Justin Brownlee (27)	Christian Standhardinger (16)	LA Tenorio (9)	SM Mall of Asia Arena; 13,272	2–1
4	March 30, 2022	NLEX	W 112–93	Justin Brownlee (47)	Christian Standhardinger (11)	Christian Standhardinger (7)	Smart Araneta Coliseum; 10,353	3–1

Finals: 4–2

Game	Date	Opponent	Score	High points	High rebounds	High assists	Location Attendance	Series
1	April 6, 2022	Meralco	L 91–104	Justin Brownlee (27)	Christian Standhardinger (14)	Scottie Thompson (10)	Smart Araneta Coliseum; 12,457	0–1
2	April 8, 2022	Meralco	W 99–93	Justin Brownlee (36)	Justin Brownlee (13)	Justin Brownlee (9)	SM Mall of Asia Arena; 12,248	1–1
3	April 10, 2022	Meralco	L 74–83	Justin Brownlee (19)	Justin Brownlee (15)	Justin Brownlee (7)	SM Mall of Asia Arena; 16,104	1–2
4	April 13, 2022	Meralco	W 95–84	Brownlee, Thompson (27)	Justin Brownlee (18)	Justin Brownlee (7)	Smart Araneta Coliseum; 17,298	2–2
5	April 17, 2022	Meralco	W 115–110	Justin Brownlee (40)	Justin Brownlee (11)	Scottie Thompson (11)	Smart Araneta Coliseum; 18,251	3–2
6	April 22, 2022	Meralco	W 103–92	LA Tenorio (30)	Justin Brownlee (16)	Justin Brownlee (6)	SM Mall of Asia Arena; 20,224	4–2

== Transactions ==
=== Free agency ===
==== Signings ====
Player	Date signed	Contract amount	Contract length	Former team
Greg Slaughter	February 4, 2021	Not disclosed	Not disclosed	Re-signed
Jesper Ayaay	February 8, 2021	Not disclosed	Not disclosed	Alaska
Scottie Thompson	March 12, 2021	Not disclosed	3 years	Re-signed
Aljon Mariano	March 13, 2021	Not disclosed	Not disclosed	Re-signed
Stanley Pringle	November 23, 2021	Not disclosed	3 years	Re-signed
Christian Standhardinger	January 5, 2022	Not disclosed	3 years	Re-signed
Japeth Aguilar	January 6, 2022	Not disclosed	3 years	Re-signed
John Pinto	January 7, 2022	Not disclosed	3 years	Meralco
Prince Caperal	February 2, 2022	Not disclosed	2 years	Re-signed
Maurice Shaw	February 8, 2022	Not disclosed	Not disclosed	Blackwater

=== Rookie signings ===
Player	Signed	PBA D-League team
Ken Holmqvist	Not disclosed	FEU
Brian Enriquez	Not disclosed	William Woods

=== Trades ===
==== Pre-season ====
March
March 5, 2021	To Barangay Ginebra Christian Standhardinger	To NorthPort Greg Slaughter
March 12, 2021	To Barangay Ginebra 2020 Terrafirma second-round pick	To NorthPort Jerrick Balanza; 2020 Barangay Ginebra second-round pick

==== Mid-season ====
November
November 9, 2021	To Barangay Ginebra Sidney Onwubere	To NorthPort Arthur dela Cruz

=== Recruited imports ===
Tournament	Name	Debuted	Last game	Record
Governors' Cup	Justin Brownlee	December 12, 2021 (vs. Alaska)	April 22, 2022 (vs. Meralco)	15–8

== Awards ==
Recipient	Award	Date awarded
Justin Brownlee	2021 PBA Governors' Cup Best Import of the Conference	April 13, 2022
Scottie Thompson	2021 PBA Governors' Cup Best Player of the Conference	April 13, 2022
Scottie Thompson	2021 PBA Governors' Cup Finals Most Valuable Player	April 23, 2022
Scottie Thompson	2021 PBA Most Valuable Player	June 5, 2022
Honors
Scottie Thompson	2021 PBA Mythical First Team	June 5, 2022
Christian Standhardinger	2021 PBA Mythical Second Team	June 5, 2022
