= 2021 NLEX Road Warriors season =

- Head coach: Yeng Guiao
- Owner(s): Metro Pacific Investments Corporation (an MVP Group subsidiary)

Philippine Cup results
- Record: 5–6 (45.5%)
- Place: 7th
- Playoff finish: Quarterfinalist (lost to Meralco with twice-to-win disadvantage)

Governors' Cup results
- Record: 8–3 (72.7%)
- Place: 2nd
- Playoff finish: Semifinalist (lost to Barangay Ginebra, 1–3)

NLEX Road Warriors seasons

The 2021 NLEX Road Warriors season was the 7th season of the franchise in the Philippine Basketball Association (PBA).

== Key dates ==
- March 14: The PBA season 46 draft was held at the TV5 Media Center in Mandaluyong.

== Draft picks ==
=== Special draft ===
Pick	Player	Position	Place of birth	College
3	Tzaddy Rangel	Center	Philippines	NU

=== Regular draft ===
Round	Pick	Player	Position	Place of birth	College
1	3	Calvin Oftana	Forward	Philippines	San Beda
2	20	David Murrell	Forward	USA	UP
3	28	Antonio Bonsubre	Forward	Philippines	San Beda
4	39	Jose Presbitero	Guard	Philippines	San Beda
5	49	Joseph Alcantara	Guard	Philippines	La Consolacion
6	57	Alberto Torres	Guard	Philippines	Canottieri Milano

== Roster ==
2021 NLEX Road Warriors roster
Players
Coaches

Pos.	#	POB	Name	Height	Weight	DOB (YYYY–MM–DD)	From
C	0	(Philippines)	Justin Chua	6 ft 6 in (1.98 m)	232 lb (105 kg)	1989–07–13	Ateneo
F	1	(United States)	David Murrell (R)	6 ft 4 in (1.93 m)	195 lb (88 kg)	1996–11–08	UP Diliman
F/C	2	(Philippines)	Michael Miranda	6 ft 6 in (1.98 m)	210 lb (95 kg)	1990–12–12	San Sebastian
C	4	(Philippines)	Raul Soyud	6 ft 6 in (1.98 m)	222 lb (101 kg)	1991–01–14	UP Diliman
G	5	(United States)	Kris Rosales	6 ft 0 in (1.83 m)	165 lb (75 kg)	1990–12–20	Hope International
G	7	(Philippines)	Kevin Alas	6 ft 0 in (1.83 m)	175 lb (79 kg)	1991–11–13	Letran
F	8	(Philippines)	Don Trollano	6 ft 3 in (1.91 m)	182 lb (83 kg)	1992–01–07	Adamson
G	9	(Philippines)	Philip Paniamogan	6 ft 0 in (1.83 m)	180 lb (82 kg)	1991–05–30	José Rizal
F	10	(United States)	Paul Varilla	6 ft 3 in (1.91 m)	185 lb (84 kg)	1993–08–10	UE
F	17	(Philippines)	Kenneth Ighalo	6 ft 2 in (1.88 m)	175 lb (79 kg)	1989–01–11	Mapúa
F	18	(Philippines)	Calvin Oftana (R)	6 ft 5 in (1.96 m)	196 lb (89 kg)	1996–01–03	San Beda
F/C	22	(Philippines)	Marion Magat	6 ft 7 in (2.01 m)	180 lb (82 kg)	1989–10–22	National-U
G	27	(Philippines)	Bong Galanza	6 ft 2 in (1.88 m)	185 lb (84 kg)	1992–12–21	UE
G	31	(Philippines)	Matt Nieto (R)	6 ft 1 in (1.85 m)	160 lb (73 kg)	1997–05–31	Ateneo
F	33	(Australia)	Anthony Semerad	6 ft 4 in (1.93 m)	220 lb (100 kg)	1991–04–25	San Beda
F/C	37	(Philippines)	J. R. Quiñahan (C)	6 ft 6 in (1.98 m)	235 lb (107 kg)	1984–05–08	Visayas

Head coach

- (Philippines) Yeng Guiao

Assistant coach(es)

- (Philippines) Adonis Tierra (1st assistant)
- (Philippines) Jojo Lastimosa
- (Philippines) Ford Arao
- (Philippines) Jonas Mendoza
- (Philippines) Borgie Hermida
- (Philippines) Emman Monfort

Team manager

- (Philippines) Ronald Dulatre
- (Philippines) Raymond Celis (Assistant)

Legend

- (C) Team captain
- (CI) Commissioner's Cup Import
- (GI) Governors' Cup Import
- (EI) EASL Import
- (DP) Unsigned draft pick
- (FA) Free agent
- (IN) Inactive
- (S) Suspended
- (R) Rookie
- Injured

Roster

== Philippine Cup ==
=== Eliminations ===
==== Standings ====
Pos	Team	W	L	PCT	GB	Qualification
1	TNT Tropang Giga	10	1	.909	—	Twice-to-beat in the quarterfinals
2	Meralco Bolts	9	2	.818	1	Twice-to-beat in the quarterfinals
3	Magnolia Pambansang Manok Hotshots	8	3	.727	2	Best-of-three quarterfinals
4	San Miguel Beermen	7	4	.636	3	Best-of-three quarterfinals
5	NorthPort Batang Pier	6	5	.545 (Note: Head-to-head record: NorthPort 1–0 Rain or Shine)	4	Best-of-three quarterfinals
6	Rain or Shine Elasto Painters	6	5	.545	4	Best-of-three quarterfinals
7	NLEX Road Warriors	5	6	.455	5	Twice-to-win in the quarterfinals
8	Barangay Ginebra San Miguel	4	7	.364 (Note: Head-to-head quotient: Phoenix 1.03, Barangay Ginebra 1.01, Terrafirma 0.96; eighth seed playoff: Barangay Ginebra 95–85 Phoenix)	6	Twice-to-win in the quarterfinals
9	Phoenix Super LPG Fuel Masters	4	7	.364	6	
10	Terrafirma Dyip	4	7	.364	6	
11	Alaska Aces	3	8	.273	7	
12	Blackwater Bossing	0	11	.000	10	

Source: PBA.ph
Rules for classification: 1) winning percentage; 2) if two teams are tied, head-to-head record; if three or more teams are tied, head-to-head goal average (quotient), if tied for 8th, one-game playoff; 3) overall quotient 4) coin toss

==== Game log ====
2021 PBA Philippine Cup game log
Total: 5–6
July: 2–2

Game	Date	Opponent	Score	High points	High rebounds	High assists	Location Attendance	Record
1	July 16	Rain or Shine	L 82–83	Kiefer Ravena (23)	Michael Miranda (8)	Kiefer Ravena (7)	Ynares Sports Arena	0–1
2	July 18	Barangay Ginebra	W 94–75	Kevin Alas (20)	J. R. Quiñahan (10)	Kiefer Ravena (5)	Ynares Sports Arena	1–1
3	July 23	San Miguel	L 93–110	Kevin Alas (20)	Raul Soyud (7)	Kiefer Ravena (7)	Ynares Sports Arena	1–2
4	July 25	Terrafirma	W 108–94	Kevin Alas (21)	Raul Soyud (12)	Kiefer Ravena (7)	Ynares Sports Arena	2–2

September: 3–4

Game	Date	Opponent	Score	High points	High rebounds	High assists	Location Attendance	Record
5	September 2	Alaska	W 84–74	J. R. Quiñahan (18)	Kevin Alas (7)	Kevin Alas (3)	DHVSU Gym	3–2
6	September 4	Phoenix Super LPG	W 94–76	Jericho Cruz (19)	Calvin Oftana (8)	Jericho Cruz (8)	DHVSU Gym	4–2
7	September 8	Magnolia	L 105–112 (2OT)	Jericho Cruz (21)	Raul Soyud (16)	Jericho Cruz (8)	DHVSU Gym	4–3
8	September 10	TNT	L 85–100	Kevin Alas (16)	Miranda, Soyud, Trollano (7)	J. R. Quiñahan (5)	DHVSU Gym	4–4
9	September 12	NorthPort	L 94–96	Don Trollano (19)	Jericho Cruz (10)	Alas, Cruz (6)	DHVSU Gym	4–5
10	September 16	Blackwater	W 90–73	J. R. Quiñahan (16)	Raul Soyud (11)	Jericho Cruz (5)	DHVSU Gym	5–5
11	September 22	Meralco	L 101–104	Calvin Oftana (34)	Raul Soyud (12)	Kevin Alas (5)	DHVSU Gym	5–6

=== Playoffs ===
==== Bracket ====
Quarterfinals
(#1 twice-to-beat)
1	TNT	84
8	Barangay Ginebra	71
(Best-of-3)
4	San Miguel	2
5	NorthPort	0
(#2 twice-to-beat)
2	Meralco	80	97
7	NLEX	81	86
(Best-of-3)
3	Magnolia	2
6	Rain or Shine	0

Semifinals (Best-of-7)
1	TNT	4
4	San Miguel	3
2	Meralco	2
3	Magnolia	4

Finals (Best-of-7)
1	TNT	4
3	Magnolia	1

==== Game log ====
2021 PBA Philippine Cup playoffs game log
Total: 1–1
Quarterfinals: 1–1

Game	Date	Opponent	Score	High points	High rebounds	High assists	Location Attendance	Series
1	September 29	Meralco	W 81–80	Anthony Semerad (23)	Calvin Oftana (9)	Calvin Oftana (5)	DHVSU Gym	1–0
2	October 1	Meralco	L 86–97	Don Trollano (19)	Calvin Oftana (11)	Kevin Alas (4)	DHVSU Gym	1–1

== Governors' Cup ==
=== Eliminations ===
==== Standings ====
Pos	Team	W	L	PCT	GB	Qualification
1	Magnolia Pambansang Manok Hotshots	9	2	.818	—	Twice-to-beat in quarterfinals
2	NLEX Road Warriors	8	3	.727	1	Twice-to-beat in quarterfinals
3	TNT Tropang Giga	7	4	.636 (Note: Head-to-head quotient: TNT 1.07, Meralco 0.99, San Miguel 0.95)	2	Twice-to-beat in quarterfinals
4	Meralco Bolts	7	4	.636	2	Twice-to-beat in quarterfinals
5	San Miguel Beermen	7	4	.636	2	Twice-to-win in quarterfinals
6	Barangay Ginebra San Miguel	6	5	.545 (Note: Head-to-head record: Barangay Ginebra 1–0 Alaska)	3	Twice-to-win in quarterfinals
7	Alaska Aces	6	5	.545	3	Twice-to-win in quarterfinals
8	Phoenix Super LPG Fuel Masters	5	6	.455 (Note: Eighth seed playoff: Phoenix 101–98 NorthPort)	4	Twice-to-win in quarterfinals
9	NorthPort Batang Pier	5	6	.455	4	
10	Rain or Shine Elasto Painters	3	8	.273	6	
11	Terrafirma Dyip	2	9	.182	7	
12	Blackwater Bossing	1	10	.091	8	

Source: PBA.ph
Rules for classification: 1) winning percentage; 2) if two teams are tied, head-to-head record; if three or more teams are tied, head-to-head goal average (quotient), if tied for 8th, one-game playoff; 3) overall quotient 4) coin toss

==== Game log ====
2021 PBA Governors' Cup game log
Total: 8–3
December: 4–1

Game	Date	Opponent	Score	High points	High rebounds	High assists	Location Attendance	Record
1	December 8	San Miguel	W 114–102	K. J. McDaniels (27)	K. J. McDaniels (11)	Kevin Alas (8)	Ynares Sports Arena	1–0
2	December 10	NorthPort	W 120–115 (OT)	K. J. McDaniels (40)	K. J. McDaniels (15)	K. J. McDaniels (6)	Ynares Sports Arena	2–0
3	December 15	TNT	W 102–100	K. J. McDaniels (33)	K. J. McDaniels (8)	Alas, Cruz (4)	Smart Araneta Coliseum	3–0
4	December 18	Terrafirma	W 116–86	K. J. McDaniels (34)	K. J. McDaniels (13)	Paniamogan, Quiñahan (5)	Smart Araneta Coliseum	4–0
5	December 25	Phoenix Super LPG	L 93–102	Calvin Oftana (18)	Calvin Oftana (11)	Kevin Alas (7)	Smart Araneta Coliseum; 4,843	4–1

February: 3–2

Game	Date	Opponent	Score	High points	High rebounds	High assists	Location Attendance	Record
6	February 11, 2022	Meralco	L 100–110	K. J. McDaniels (41)	K. J. McDaniels (12)	J. R. Quiñahan (5)	Smart Araneta Coliseum	4–2
7	February 16, 2022	Magnolia	L 109–112	K. J. McDaniels (35)	K. J. McDaniels (13)	McDaniels, Trollano (3)	Smart Araneta Coliseum	4–3
8	February 18, 2022	Blackwater	W 117–97	K. J. McDaniels (24)	K. J. McDaniels (11)	Don Trollano (6)	Smart Araneta Coliseum	5–3
9	February 23, 2022	Alaska	W 106–89	K. J. McDaniels (27)	K. J. McDaniels (11)	Alas, Nieto (4)	Ynares Center	6–3
10	February 25, 2022	Rain or Shine	W 109–100 (OT)	K. J. McDaniels (35)	K. J. McDaniels (12)	Kevin Alas (7)	Ynares Center	7–3

March: 1–0

Game	Date	Opponent	Score	High points	High rebounds	High assists	Location Attendance	Record
11	March 4, 2022	Barangay Ginebra	W 115–103	K. J. McDaniels (26)	Alas, McDaniels (10)	Kevin Alas (8)	Smart Araneta Coliseum	8–3

=== Playoffs ===
==== Bracket ====
Quarterfinals (Top 4 twice-to-beat)
1	Magnolia	127
8	Phoenix Super LPG	88
4	Meralco	100
5	San Miguel	85
2	NLEX	79	96
7	Alaska	93	80
3	TNT	92	95
6	Barangay Ginebra	104	115

Semifinals (Best-of-5)
1	Magnolia	2
4	Meralco	3
2	NLEX	1
6	Barangay Ginebra	3

Finals (Best-of-7)
4	Meralco	2
6	Barangay Ginebra	4

==== Game log ====
2021 PBA Governors' Cup playoffs game log
Total: 2–4
Quarterfinals: 1–1

Game	Date	Opponent	Score	High points	High rebounds	High assists	Location Attendance	Series
1	March 16, 2022	Alaska	L 79–93	Cameron Clark (25)	Cameron Clark (16)	Kevin Alas (4)	Smart Araneta Coliseum; 7,091	0–1
2	March 19, 2022	Alaska	W 96–80	Cameron Clark (24)	Raul Soyud (9)	Kevin Alas (4)	Smart Araneta Coliseum; 10,486	1–1

Semifinals: 1–3

Game	Date	Opponent	Score	High points	High rebounds	High assists	Location Attendance	Series
1	March 23, 2022	Barangay Ginebra	L 86–95	Cameron Clark (30)	Cameron Clark (13)	Kevin Alas (5)	SM Mall of Asia Arena	0–1
2	March 25, 2022	Barangay Ginebra	L 94–104	Matt Nieto (19)	Don Trollano (6)	Kevin Alas (5)	SM Mall of Asia Arena	0–2
3	March 27, 2022	Barangay Ginebra	W 86–85	Cameron Clark (21)	Cameron Clark (17)	Alas, Clark (4)	SM Mall of Asia Arena; 13,272	1–2
4	March 30, 2022	Barangay Ginebra	L 94–104	Cameron Clark (34)	Cameron Clark (12)	Kevin Alas (6)	Smart Araneta Coliseum; 10,353	1–3

== Transactions ==
=== Free agency ===
==== Signings ====
Player	Date signed	Contract amount	Contract length	Former team
Kris Rosales	November 16, 2021	Not disclosed	One-season	Rain or Shine Elasto Painters

=== Trades ===
==== Pre-season ====
March
March 11, 2021	To NLEX Maurice Shaw; Roi Sumang; Don Trollano; 2022 Blackwater second-round pick	To Blackwater 2020 NLEX first-round pick (No. 4)

==== Mid-season ====
November
November 16, 2021	To NLEX Marion Magat; 2023 Blackwater second-round pick	To Blackwater Mike Ayonayon; Will McAloney

=== Recruited imports ===
Tournament	Name	Debuted	Last game	Record
Governors' Cup	K. J. McDaniels	December 8, 2021 (vs. San Miguel)	March 4, 2022 (vs. Barangay Ginebra)	8–3
Governors' Cup	Cameron Clark	March 16, 2022 (vs. Alaska)	March 30, 2022 (vs. Barangay Ginebra)	2–4
