= 2021 TNT Tropang Giga season =

- Head coach: Chot Reyes
- General Manager: Gabby Cui; Miguel Fernandez (assistant)
- Owner(s): Smart Communications (an MVP Group subsidiary)

Philippine Cup results
- Record: 10–1 (90.9%)
- Place: 1st
- Playoff finish: Champions (Defeated Magnolia, 4–1)

Governors' Cup results
- Record: 7–4 (63.6%)
- Place: 3rd
- Playoff finish: Quarterfinalist (lost to Barangay Ginebra with twice-to-beat advantage)

TNT Tropang Giga seasons

The 2021 TNT Tropang Giga season was the 31st season of the franchise in the Philippine Basketball Association (PBA).

== Key dates ==
- March 14: The PBA season 46 draft was held at the TV5 Media Center in Mandaluyong.

== Draft picks ==
=== Special draft ===
| Pick | Player | Position | Place of birth | College |
|---|---|---|---|---|
| 4 | Jaydee Tungcab | Guard | Philippines | UP Diliman |

=== Regular draft ===
| Round | Pick | Player | Position | Place of birth | College |
|---|---|---|---|---|---|
| 1 | 4 | Mikey Williams | Guard | USA | Cal State Fullerton |
| 3 | 35 | Michael Simmonds | Guard/Forward | USA | Baruch |
| 4 | 45 | Joel Lee Yu | Guard | Philippines | FEU |
| 5 | 53 | Martin Gozum | Forward | Philippines | OLFU |

== Roster ==
2021 TNT Tropang Giga roster
Players
Coaches

| Pos. | # | POB | Name | Height | Weight | DOB (YYYY–MM–DD) | From |
|---|---|---|---|---|---|---|---|
| F | 2 | (Philippines) | Carl Bryan Cruz | 6 ft 4 in (1.93 m) | 200 lb (91 kg) | 1991–08–21 | Far Eastern |
| G | 5 | (United States) | Mikey Williams (R) | 6 ft 2 in (1.88 m) | 190 lb (86 kg) | 1991–10–27 | Cal State Fullerton |
| C | 7 | (Philippines) | Poy Erram | 6 ft 8 in (2.03 m) | 227 lb (103 kg) | 1989–07–07 | Ateneo |
| G | 8 | (Philippines) | Chris Exciminiano | 6 ft 0 in (1.83 m) | 185 lb (84 kg) | 1988–11–17 | Far Eastern |
| G | 10 | (Philippines) | Ryan Reyes (C) | 6 ft 2 in (1.88 m) | 190 lb (86 kg) | 1983–08–10 | Cal State Fullerton |
| F | 12 | (Philippines) | Glenn Khobuntin | 6 ft 4 in (1.93 m) | 195 lb (88 kg) | 1991–09–07 | National-U |
| G | 13 | (Philippines) | Brian Heruela | 5 ft 10 in (1.78 m) | 195 lb (88 kg) | 1989–04–13 | Cebu |
| G | 15 | (Philippines) | Kib Montalbo | 6 ft 0 in (1.83 m) | 155 lb (70 kg) | 1996–04–02 | De La Salle |
| G/F | 16 | (Philippines) | Roger Pogoy | 6 ft 2 in (1.88 m) | 180 lb (82 kg) | 1992–06–16 | Far Eastern |
| G | 17 | (Philippines) | Jayson Castro | 5 ft 10 in (1.78 m) | 185 lb (84 kg) | 1986–06–30 | Philippine Christian |
| F | 18 | (Philippines) | Troy Rosario | 6 ft 7 in (2.01 m) | 198 lb (90 kg) | 1992–01–20 | National-U |
| G | 20 | (Philippines) | Jjay Alejandro | 6 ft 0 in (1.83 m) | 165 lb (75 kg) | 1995–04–13 | National-U |
| F/C | 21 | (Philippines) | Kelly Williams | 6 ft 6 in (1.98 m) | 215 lb (98 kg) | 1982–02–07 | Oakland |
| F/C | 22 | (Philippines) | Dave Marcelo | 6 ft 5 in (1.96 m) | 223 lb (101 kg) | 1989–02–22 | San Beda |
| G/F | 24 | (Philippines) | Matt Ganuelas-Rosser | 6 ft 4 in (1.93 m) | 186 lb (84 kg) | 1990–06–13 | Cal Poly Pomona |
| G/F | 29 | (Philippines) | Gryann Mendoza | 6 ft 1 in (1.85 m) | 180 lb (82 kg) | 1990–09–09 | Far Eastern |
| F | 77 | (Philippines) | Gab Banal | 6 ft 3 in (1.91 m) | 200 lb (91 kg) | 1990–09–09 | Mapúa |

Head coach

- (Philippines) Chot Reyes

Assistant coach(es)

- (Philippines) Josh Reyes (1st assistant)
- (Philippines) Bong Ravena
- (Philippines) Sandy Arespacochaga
- (Philippines) Ranidel de Ocampo
- (United States) Alton Lister
- (Philippines) Yuri Escueta
- (Philippines) Mau Belen

Team manager

- (Philippines) Gabby Cui
- (Philippines) Miguel Fernandez (assistant)

Legend

- (C) Team captain
- (CI) Commissioner's Cup Import
- (GI) Governors' Cup Import
- (EI) EASL Import
- (DP) Unsigned draft pick
- (FA) Free agent
- (IN) Inactive
- (S) Suspended
- (R) Rookie
- Injured

Roster

== Philippine Cup ==
=== Eliminations ===
==== Standings ====
| Pos | Team | W | L | PCT | GB | Qualification |
|---|---|---|---|---|---|---|
| 1 | TNT Tropang Giga | 10 | 1 | .909 | — | Twice-to-beat in the quarterfinals |
| 2 | Meralco Bolts | 9 | 2 | .818 | 1 | Twice-to-beat in the quarterfinals |
| 3 | Magnolia Pambansang Manok Hotshots | 8 | 3 | .727 | 2 | Best-of-three quarterfinals |
| 4 | San Miguel Beermen | 7 | 4 | .636 | 3 | Best-of-three quarterfinals |
| 5 | NorthPort Batang Pier | 6 | 5 | .545 (Note: Head-to-head record: NorthPort 1–0 Rain or Shine) | 4 | Best-of-three quarterfinals |
| 6 | Rain or Shine Elasto Painters | 6 | 5 | .545 | 4 | Best-of-three quarterfinals |
| 7 | NLEX Road Warriors | 5 | 6 | .455 | 5 | Twice-to-win in the quarterfinals |
| 8 | Barangay Ginebra San Miguel | 4 | 7 | .364 (Note: Head-to-head quotient: Phoenix 1.03, Barangay Ginebra 1.01, Terrafirma 0.96; eighth seed playoff: Barangay Ginebra 95–85 Phoenix) | 6 | Twice-to-win in the quarterfinals |
| 9 | Phoenix Super LPG Fuel Masters | 4 | 7 | .364 | 6 | |
| 10 | Terrafirma Dyip | 4 | 7 | .364 | 6 | |
| 11 | Alaska Aces | 3 | 8 | .273 | 7 | |
| 12 | Blackwater Bossing | 0 | 11 | .000 | 10 | |

Source: PBA.ph
Rules for classification: 1) winning percentage; 2) if two teams are tied, head-to-head record; if three or more teams are tied, head-to-head goal average (quotient), if tied for 8th, one-game playoff; 3) overall quotient 4) coin toss

==== Game log ====
2021 PBA Philippine Cup game log
Total: 10–1
July: 2–0

| Game | Date | Opponent | Score | High points | High rebounds | High assists | Location Attendance | Record |
|---|---|---|---|---|---|---|---|---|
| 1 | July 17 | Terrafirma | W 86–79 | Jayson Castro (17) | John Paul Erram (11) | Pogoy, Reyes (5) | Ynares Sports Arena | 1–0 |
| 2 | July 30 | Rain or Shine | W 79–69 | Pogoy, Rosario (13) | Troy Rosario (14) | Jayson Castro (7) | Ynares Sports Arena | 2–0 |

August: 1–0

| Game | Date | Opponent | Score | High points | High rebounds | High assists | Location Attendance | Record |
|---|---|---|---|---|---|---|---|---|
| 3 | August 1 | Phoenix Super LPG | W 84–80 | Troy Rosario (15) | Mikey Williams (9) | Jayson Castro (9) | Ynares Sports Arena | 3–0 |

September: 7–1

| Game | Date | Opponent | Score | High points | High rebounds | High assists | Location Attendance | Record |
|---|---|---|---|---|---|---|---|---|
| 4 | September 1 | Blackwater | W 96–76 | Mikey Williams (16) | Troy Rosario (11) | Roger Pogoy (4) | DHVSU Gym | 4–0 |
| 5 | September 3 | Meralco | W 91–76 | Mikey Williams (27) | Erram, Rosario (9) | Castro, Rosario, K. Williams, M. Williams (2) | DHVSU Gym | 5–0 |
| 6 | September 5 | Magnolia | W 83–76 | Jayson Castro (17) | Kelly Williams (15) | Mikey Williams (5) | DHVSU Gym | 6–0 |
| 7 | September 8 | San Miguel | L 67–83 | Kib Montalbo (13) | Troy Rosario (7) | Montalbo, M. Williams (4) | DHVSU Gym | 6–1 |
| 8 | September 10 | NLEX | W 100–85 | Mikey Williams (36) | Kelly Williams (9) | Kelly Williams (4) | DHVSU Gym | 7–1 |
| 9 | September 12 | Barangay Ginebra | W 88–67 | Mikey Williams (27) | Roger Pogoy (8) | Jayson Castro (5) | DHVSU Gym | 8–1 |
| 10 | September 15 | NorthPort | W 102–92 | Mikey Williams (29) | Ryan Reyes (9) | Mikey Williams (5) | DHVSU Gym | 9–1 |
| 11 | September 18 | Alaska | W 103–85 | Roger Pogoy (18) | John Paul Erram (8) | Mikey Williams (7) | DHVSU Gym | 10–1 |

=== Playoffs ===
==== Bracket ====
Quarterfinals
(#1 twice-to-beat)
1 | TNT | 84
8 | Barangay Ginebra | 71
(Best-of-3)
4 | San Miguel | 2
5 | NorthPort | 0
(#2 twice-to-beat)
2 | Meralco | 80 | 97
7 | NLEX | 81 | 86
(Best-of-3)
3 | Magnolia | 2
6 | Rain or Shine | 0

Semifinals (Best-of-7)
1 | TNT | 4
4 | San Miguel | 3
2 | Meralco | 2
3 | Magnolia | 4

Finals (Best-of-7)
1 | TNT | 4
3 | Magnolia | 1

==== Game log ====
2021 PBA Philippine Cup playoffs game log
Total: 9–4
Quarterfinals: 1–0

| Game | Date | Opponent | Score | High points | High rebounds | High assists | Location Attendance | Series |
|---|---|---|---|---|---|---|---|---|
| 1 | September 29 | Barangay Ginebra | W 84–71 | Roger Pogoy (16) | K. Williams, M. Williams (7) | Reyes, M. Williams (5) | DHVSU Gym | 1–0 |

Semifinals: 4–3

| Game | Date | Opponent | Score | High points | High rebounds | High assists | Location Attendance | Series |
|---|---|---|---|---|---|---|---|---|
| 1 | October 3 | San Miguel | W 89–88 | Roger Pogoy (23) | Mikey Williams (8) | Castro, M. Williams (6) | DHVSU Gym | 1–0 |
| 2 | October 6 | San Miguel | L 96–98 | Roger Pogoy (21) | Erram, Marcelo (10) | Mikey Williams (7) | DHVSU Gym | 1–1 |
| 3 | October 8 | San Miguel | W 115–98 | Roger Pogoy (26) | John Paul Erram (13) | Mikey Williams (5) | DHVSU Gym | 2–1 |
| 4 | October 10 | San Miguel | L 90–116 | Jayson Castro (15) | Dave Marcelo (14) | Castro, Heruela, M. Williams (4) | DHVSU Gym | 2–2 |
| 5 | October 13 | San Miguel | W 110–90 | Jayson Castro (19) | Troy Rosario (8) | Jayson Castro (8) | DHVSU Gym | 3–2 |
| 6 | October 15 | San Miguel | L 90–103 | Castro, Reyes (16) | Troy Rosario (10) | Mikey Williams (5) | DHVSU Gym | 3–3 |
| 7 | October 17 | San Miguel | W 97–79 | Roger Pogoy (27) | Troy Rosario (12) | Mikey Williams (6) | DHVSU Gym | 4–3 |

Finals: 4–1

| Game | Date | Opponent | Score | High points | High rebounds | High assists | Location Attendance | Series |
|---|---|---|---|---|---|---|---|---|
| 1 | October 20 | Magnolia | W 88–70 | Mikey Williams (21) | Mikey Williams (10) | Mikey Williams (5) | DHVSU Gym | 1–0 |
| 2 | October 22 | Magnolia | W 105–93 | Mikey Williams (28) | John Paul Erram (12) | Mikey Williams (6) | DHVSU Gym | 2–0 |
| 3 | October 24 | Magnolia | L 98–106 | Mikey Williams (39) | John Paul Erram (11) | Brian Heruela (5) | DHVSU Gym | 2–1 |
| 4 | October 27 | Magnolia | W 106–89 | Mikey Williams (26) | Kelly Williams (7) | Mikey Williams (7) | DHVSU Gym | 3–1 |
| 5 | October 29 | Magnolia | W 94–79 | Mikey Williams (24) | John Paul Erram (10) | Mikey Williams (4) | DHVSU Gym | 4–1 |

== Governors' Cup ==
=== Eliminations ===
==== Standings ====
| Pos | Team | W | L | PCT | GB | Qualification |
|---|---|---|---|---|---|---|
| 1 | Magnolia Pambansang Manok Hotshots | 9 | 2 | .818 | — | Twice-to-beat in quarterfinals |
| 2 | NLEX Road Warriors | 8 | 3 | .727 | 1 | Twice-to-beat in quarterfinals |
| 3 | TNT Tropang Giga | 7 | 4 | .636 (Note: Head-to-head quotient: TNT 1.07, Meralco 0.99, San Miguel 0.95) | 2 | Twice-to-beat in quarterfinals |
| 4 | Meralco Bolts | 7 | 4 | .636 | 2 | Twice-to-beat in quarterfinals |
| 5 | San Miguel Beermen | 7 | 4 | .636 | 2 | Twice-to-win in quarterfinals |
| 6 | Barangay Ginebra San Miguel | 6 | 5 | .545 (Note: Head-to-head record: Barangay Ginebra 1–0 Alaska) | 3 | Twice-to-win in quarterfinals |
| 7 | Alaska Aces | 6 | 5 | .545 | 3 | Twice-to-win in quarterfinals |
| 8 | Phoenix Super LPG Fuel Masters | 5 | 6 | .455 (Note: Eighth seed playoff: Phoenix 101–98 NorthPort) | 4 | Twice-to-win in quarterfinals |
| 9 | NorthPort Batang Pier | 5 | 6 | .455 | 4 | |
| 10 | Rain or Shine Elasto Painters | 3 | 8 | .273 | 6 | |
| 11 | Terrafirma Dyip | 2 | 9 | .182 | 7 | |
| 12 | Blackwater Bossing | 1 | 10 | .091 | 8 | |

Source: PBA.ph
Rules for classification: 1) winning percentage; 2) if two teams are tied, head-to-head record; if three or more teams are tied, head-to-head goal average (quotient), if tied for 8th, one-game playoff; 3) overall quotient 4) coin toss

==== Game log ====
2021 PBA Governors' Cup game log
Total: 7–4
December: 2–2

| Game | Date | Opponent | Score | High points | High rebounds | High assists | Location Attendance | Record |
|---|---|---|---|---|---|---|---|---|
| 1 | December 15 | NLEX | L 100–102 | Kelly Williams (16) | McKenzie Moore (14) | McKenzie Moore (9) | Smart Araneta Coliseum | 0–1 |
| 2 | December 17 | Alaska | W 81–77 | Jayson Castro (20) | Poy Erram (9) | Jayson Castro (6) | Smart Araneta Coliseum | 1–1 |
| 3 | December 22 | Meralco | L 80–83 | Roger Pogoy (25) | Poy Erram (13) | Mikey Williams (4) | Smart Araneta Coliseum | 1–2 |
| 4 | December 26 | Rain or Shine | W 95–92 | Mikey Williams (25) | Aaron Fuller (10) | Mikey Williams (6) | Smart Araneta Coliseum | 2–2 |

February: 2–2

| Game | Date | Opponent | Score | High points | High rebounds | High assists | Location Attendance | Record |
|---|---|---|---|---|---|---|---|---|
| 5 | February 11, 2022 | Magnolia | L 93–96 | Aaron Fuller (21) | Aaron Fuller (11) | Jayson Castro (8) | Smart Araneta Coliseum | 2–3 |
| 6 | February 13, 2022 | Phoenix Super LPG | L 92–93 | Mikey Williams (22) | Aaron Fuller (23) | Jayson Castro (7) | Smart Araneta Coliseum | 2–4 |
| 7 | February 16, 2022 | San Miguel | W 96–81 | Mikey Williams (30) | Aaron Fuller (26) | Kib Montalbo (5) | Smart Araneta Coliseum | 3–4 |
| 8 | February 18, 2022 | Barangay Ginebra | W 119–92 | Mikey Williams (26) | Aaron Fuller (14) | Mikey Williams (5) | Smart Araneta Coliseum | 4–4 |

March: 3–0

| Game | Date | Opponent | Score | High points | High rebounds | High assists | Location Attendance | Record |
|---|---|---|---|---|---|---|---|---|
| 9 | March 4, 2022 | Blackwater | W 106–93 | Mikey Williams (23) | Aaron Fuller (22) | Jayson Castro (5) | Smart Araneta Coliseum | 5–4 |
| 10 | March 9, 2022 | Terrafirma | W 127–107 | Aaron Fuller (24) | Aaron Fuller (12) | Castro, M. Williams (6) | Smart Araneta Coliseum | 6–4 |
| 11 | March 11, 2022 | NorthPort | W 106–101 (OT) | Mikey Williams (28) | Aaron Fuller (20) | Mikey Williams (7) | Smart Araneta Coliseum | 7–4 |

=== Playoffs ===
==== Bracket ====
Quarterfinals (Top 4 twice-to-beat)
1 | Magnolia | 127
8 | Phoenix Super LPG | 88
4 | Meralco | 100
5 | San Miguel | 85
2 | NLEX | 79 | 96
7 | Alaska | 93 | 80
3 | TNT | 92 | 95
6 | Barangay Ginebra | 104 | 115

Semifinals (Best-of-5)
1 | Magnolia | 2
4 | Meralco | 3
2 | NLEX | 1
6 | Barangay Ginebra | 3

Finals (Best-of-7)
4 | Meralco | 2
6 | Barangay Ginebra | 4

==== Game log ====
2021 PBA Governors' Cup playoffs game log
Total: 0–2
Quarterfinals: 0–2

| Game | Date | Opponent | Score | High points | High rebounds | High assists | Location Attendance | Series |
|---|---|---|---|---|---|---|---|---|
| 1 | March 16, 2022 | Barangay Ginebra | L 92–104 | Aaron Fuller (22) | Aaron Fuller (19) | Jayson Castro (5) | Smart Araneta Coliseum; 7,091 | 0–1 |
| 2 | March 19, 2022 | Barangay Ginebra | L 95–115 | Mikey Williams (17) | Pogoy, Rosario (5) | Mikey Williams (6) | Smart Araneta Coliseum; 10,486 | 0–2 |

== Transactions ==
=== Trades ===
==== Pre-season ====
February
| March 11, 2021 | To TNT 2020 NLEX first-round pick (No. 4) | To Blackwater Simon Enciso; David Semerad; 2023 TNT first-round pick 2024 TNT second-round pick |

==== Mid-season ====
December
| December 3, 2021 | To TNT Carl Bryan Cruz | To Blackwater Jay Washington; 2022 NorthPort second-round pick 2025 TNT second-round pick |

=== Recruited imports ===
| Tournament | Name | Debuted | Last game | Record |
|---|---|---|---|---|
| Governors' Cup | McKenzie Moore | December 15 (vs. NLEX) | December 22 (vs. Meralco) | 1–2 |
| Governors' Cup | Aaron Fuller | December 26 (vs. Rain or Shine) | March 16 (vs. Barangay Ginebra) | 6–3 |
| Governors' Cup | Leon Gilmore III | March 19 (vs. Barangay Ginebra) | | 0–1 |
