= 2021 Rain or Shine Elasto Painters season =

- Head coach: Chris Gavina
- Owner(s): Asian Coatings Philippines, Inc.

Philippine Cup results
- Record: 6–5 (54.5%)
- Place: 6th
- Playoff finish: Quarterfinalist (lost to Magnolia, 0–2)

Governors' Cup results
- Record: 3–8 (27.3%)
- Place: 10th
- Playoff finish: Did not qualify

Rain or Shine Elasto Painters seasons

The 2021 Rain or Shine Elasto Painters season was the 15th season of the franchise in the Philippine Basketball Association (PBA).

== Key dates ==
- March 14: The PBA season 46 draft was held at the TV5 Media Center in Mandaluyong.

== Draft picks ==
Round	Pick	Player	Position	Place of birth	College
1	5	Leonard Santillan	Forward	Philippines	La Salle
2	17	Franky Johnson	Guard	USA	Warner Pacific
2	22	Anton Asistio	Guard	Philippines	Ateneo
2	23	Andrei Caracut	Guard	Philippines	La Salle
3	29	Kenneth Mocon	Guard	Philippines	San Beda
4	40	RJ Argamino	Guard	Philippines	Benilde
5	50	Philip Manalang	Guard	Philippines	UE

== Roster ==
2021 Rain or Shine Elasto Painters roster
Players
Coaches

Pos.	#	POB	Name	Height	Weight	DOB (YYYY–MM–DD)	From
G	1	(United States)	Trevis Jackson	5 ft 11 in (1.80 m)	171 lb (78 kg)	1995–09–14	Sacramento State
F/C	2	(Philippines)	Bradwyn Guinto	6 ft 6 in (1.98 m)	220 lb (100 kg)	1991–10–20	San Sebastian
F	5	(United States)	Gabe Norwood	6 ft 6 in (1.98 m)	190 lb (86 kg)	1985–02–09	George Mason
G	6	(Philippines)	Rey Nambatac	5 ft 11 in (1.80 m)		1994–01–27	Letran
F	7	(Philippines)	Javee Mocon	6 ft 3 in (1.91 m)	189 lb (86 kg)	1995–04–07	San Beda
G	8	(Philippines)	Anton Asistio (R)	5 ft 10 in (1.78 m)	175 lb (79 kg)	1995–06–02	Ateneo
F	9	(Philippines)	Prince Rivero	6 ft 4 in (1.93 m)	225 lb (102 kg)	1995–02–19	De La Salle
F	12	(Philippines)	Vince Tolentino	6 ft 3 in (1.91 m)	190 lb (86 kg)	1993–08–27	Ateneo
G	14	(Philippines)	Andrei Caracut (R)	5 ft 10 in (1.78 m)	180 lb (82 kg)	1996–01–30	De La Salle
F/C	15	(Philippines)	Jewel Ponferada	6 ft 5 in (1.96 m)	211 lb (96 kg)	1988–07–08	National-U
F	16	(Philippines)	Mark Borboran	6 ft 4 in (1.93 m)	185 lb (84 kg)	1984–11–01	UE
F	17	(Philippines)	Mike Nieto (R)	6 ft 2 in (1.88 m)	200 lb (91 kg)	1997–05–31	Ateneo
G/F	18	(Philippines)	James Yap	6 ft 2 in (1.88 m)	205 lb (93 kg)	1982–02–15	UE
F	25	(Philippines)	Leonard Santillan (R)	6 ft 4 in (1.93 m)	210 lb (95 kg)	1996–03–05	De La Salle
F/C	29	(Canada)	Norbert Torres	6 ft 7 in (2.01 m)	250 lb (113 kg)	1990–01–12	De La Salle
F/C	30	(Philippines)	Beau Belga (C)	6 ft 5 in (1.96 m)	245 lb (111 kg)	1986–11–30	Philippine Christian

Head coach

- (Philippines) Chris Gavina

Assistant coach(es)

- (Philippines) Mike Buendia (1st assistant)
- (Japan) Rich Alvarez
- (Philippines) Ricky Umayam
- (Philippines) Juven Formacil

Team manager

- (Philippines) Mamerto Mondragon^{[a]}
- (Philippines) Jireh Ibañes (assistant)

Legend

- (C) Team captain
- (CI) Commissioner's Cup Import
- (GI) Governors' Cup Import
- (EI) EASL Import
- (DP) Unsigned draft pick
- (FA) Free agent
- (IN) Inactive
- (S) Suspended
- (R) Rookie
- Injured

Roster

- ^{a} also serves as Rain or Shine's board governor.

== Philippine Cup ==
=== Eliminations ===
==== Standings ====
Pos	Team	W	L	PCT	GB	Qualification
1	TNT Tropang Giga	10	1	.909	—	Twice-to-beat in the quarterfinals
2	Meralco Bolts	9	2	.818	1	Twice-to-beat in the quarterfinals
3	Magnolia Pambansang Manok Hotshots	8	3	.727	2	Best-of-three quarterfinals
4	San Miguel Beermen	7	4	.636	3	Best-of-three quarterfinals
5	NorthPort Batang Pier	6	5	.545 (Note: Head-to-head record: NorthPort 1–0 Rain or Shine)	4	Best-of-three quarterfinals
6	Rain or Shine Elasto Painters	6	5	.545	4	Best-of-three quarterfinals
7	NLEX Road Warriors	5	6	.455	5	Twice-to-win in the quarterfinals
8	Barangay Ginebra San Miguel	4	7	.364 (Note: Head-to-head quotient: Phoenix 1.03, Barangay Ginebra 1.01, Terrafirma 0.96; eighth seed playoff: Barangay Ginebra 95–85 Phoenix)	6	Twice-to-win in the quarterfinals
9	Phoenix Super LPG Fuel Masters	4	7	.364	6	
10	Terrafirma Dyip	4	7	.364	6	
11	Alaska Aces	3	8	.273	7	
12	Blackwater Bossing	0	11	.000	10	

Source: PBA.ph
Rules for classification: 1) winning percentage; 2) if two teams are tied, head-to-head record; if three or more teams are tied, head-to-head goal average (quotient), if tied for 8th, one-game playoff; 3) overall quotient 4) coin toss

==== Game log ====
2021 PBA Philippine Cup game log
Total: 6–5
July: 3–2

Game	Date	Opponent	Score	High points	High rebounds	High assists	Location Attendance	Record
1	July 16	NLEX	W 83–82	Rey Nambatac (19)	Rey Nambatac (8)	Beau Belga (5)	Ynares Sports Arena	1–0
2	July 18	Blackwater	W 71–62	Rey Nambatac (21)	Mocon, Nambatac (12)	Mocon, Norwood (3)	Ynares Sports Arena	2–0
3	July 24	Meralco	W 85–72	Javee Mocon (18)	Beau Belga (10)	Javee Mocon (6)	Ynares Sports Arena	3–0
4	July 28	Alaska	L 48–74	Adrian Wong (9)	Javee Mocon (10)	Mocon, Nambatac, Ponferada (2)	Ynares Sports Arena	3–1
5	July 30	TNT	L 69–79	Javee Mocon (22)	Norbert Torres (11)	Javee Mocon (3)	Ynares Sports Arena	3–2

August: 1–0

Game	Date	Opponent	Score	High points	High rebounds	High assists	Location Attendance	Record
6	August 1	Terrafirma	W 83–77	Rey Nambatac (17)	Javee Mocon (9)	Beau Belga (5)	Ynares Sports Arena	4–2

September: 2–3

Game	Date	Opponent	Score	High points	High rebounds	High assists	Location Attendance	Record
7	September 2	Phoenix Super LPG	L 77–78	Belga, Mocon (17)	Javee Mocon (12)	Gabe Norwood (5)	DHVSU Gym	4–3
8	September 8	Barangay Ginebra	L 77–83	Rey Nambatac (18)	Mark Borboran (7)	Javee Mocon (5)	DHVSU Gym	4–4
9	September 10	Magnolia	W 75–72	Javee Mocon (19)	Javee Mocon (8)	Beau Belga (3)	DHVSU Gym	5–4
10	September 12	San Miguel	W 95–93	Leonard Santillan (21)	Javee Mocon (12)	Anton Asistio (7)	DHVSU Gym	6–4
11	September 19	NorthPort	L 88–91 (OT)	Jewel Ponferada (17)	Javee Mocon (11)	Javee Mocon (6)	DHVSU Gym	6–5

=== Playoffs ===
==== Bracket ====
Quarterfinals
(#1 twice-to-beat)
1	TNT	84
8	Barangay Ginebra	71
(Best-of-3)
4	San Miguel	2
5	NorthPort	0
(#2 twice-to-beat)
2	Meralco	80	97
7	NLEX	81	86
(Best-of-3)
3	Magnolia	2
6	Rain or Shine	0

Semifinals (Best-of-7)
1	TNT	4
4	San Miguel	3
2	Meralco	2
3	Magnolia	4

Finals (Best-of-7)
1	TNT	4
3	Magnolia	1

==== Game log ====
2021 PBA Philippine Cup playoffs game log
Total: 0–2
Quarterfinals: 0–2

Game	Date	Opponent	Score	High points	High rebounds	High assists	Location Attendance	Series
1	September 26	Magnolia	L 70–81	Leonard Santillan (17)	Leonard Santillan (12)	Beau Belga (6)	DHVSU Gym	0–1
2	September 30	Magnolia	L 86–96	James Yap (16)	Belga, Santillan (6)	Beau Belga (5)	DHVSU Gym	0–2

== Governors' Cup ==
=== Eliminations ===
==== Standings ====
Pos	Team	W	L	PCT	GB	Qualification
1	Magnolia Pambansang Manok Hotshots	9	2	.818	—	Twice-to-beat in quarterfinals
2	NLEX Road Warriors	8	3	.727	1	Twice-to-beat in quarterfinals
3	TNT Tropang Giga	7	4	.636 (Note: Head-to-head quotient: TNT 1.07, Meralco 0.99, San Miguel 0.95)	2	Twice-to-beat in quarterfinals
4	Meralco Bolts	7	4	.636	2	Twice-to-beat in quarterfinals
5	San Miguel Beermen	7	4	.636	2	Twice-to-win in quarterfinals
6	Barangay Ginebra San Miguel	6	5	.545 (Note: Head-to-head record: Barangay Ginebra 1–0 Alaska)	3	Twice-to-win in quarterfinals
7	Alaska Aces	6	5	.545	3	Twice-to-win in quarterfinals
8	Phoenix Super LPG Fuel Masters	5	6	.455 (Note: Eighth seed playoff: Phoenix 101–98 NorthPort)	4	Twice-to-win in quarterfinals
9	NorthPort Batang Pier	5	6	.455	4	
10	Rain or Shine Elasto Painters	3	8	.273	6	
11	Terrafirma Dyip	2	9	.182	7	
12	Blackwater Bossing	1	10	.091	8	

Source: PBA.ph
Rules for classification: 1) winning percentage; 2) if two teams are tied, head-to-head record; if three or more teams are tied, head-to-head goal average (quotient), if tied for 8th, one-game playoff; 3) overall quotient 4) coin toss

==== Game log ====
2021 PBA Governors' Cup game log
Total: 3–8
December: 2–3

Game	Date	Opponent	Score	High points	High rebounds	High assists	Location Attendance	Record
1	December 9	Blackwater	W 92–79	Henry Walker (20)	Javee Mocon (9)	Belga, Mocon (4)	Ynares Sports Arena	1–0
2	December 11	Terrafirma	L 106–112 (OT)	Nambatac, Walker (25)	Henry Walker (12)	Gabe Norwood (9)	Ynares Sports Arena	1–1
3	December 16	Phoenix Super LPG	W 90–88	Rey Nambatac (17)	Leonard Santillan (10)	Beau Belga (6)	Smart Araneta Coliseum	2–1
4	December 19	Magnolia	L 98–109	Nambatac, Walker (23)	Henry Walker (6)	Belga, Mocon, Nambatac (6)	Smart Araneta Coliseum	2–2
5	December 26	TNT	L 92–95	Henry Walker (32)	Henry Walker (9)	Caracut, Nambatac (4)	Smart Araneta Coliseum	2–3

February: 1–3

Game	Date	Opponent	Score	High points	High rebounds	High assists	Location Attendance	Record
6	February 12, 2022	NorthPort	W 104–90	Mike Nieto (21)	Henry Walker (11)	Henry Walker (10)	Smart Araneta Coliseum	3–3
7	February 17, 2022	Alaska	L 74–80	Henry Walker (25)	Henry Walker (13)	Gabe Norwood (5)	Smart Araneta Coliseum	3–4
8	February 20, 2022	Meralco	L 88–93	Henry Walker (24)	Borboran, Mocon, Walker (10)	Javee Mocon (6)	Smart Araneta Coliseum; 3,347	3–5
9	February 25, 2022	NLEX	L 100–109 (OT)	Henry Walker (28)	Henry Walker (13)	Gabe Norwood (5)	Ynares Center	3–6

March: 0–2

Game	Date	Opponent	Score	High points	High rebounds	High assists	Location Attendance	Record
10	March 3, 2022	San Miguel	L 100–104	Henry Walker (23)	Henry Walker (10)	Nambatac, Walker (5)	Smart Araneta Coliseum	3–7
11	March 6, 2022	Barangay Ginebra	L 93–104	Henry Walker (34)	Henry Walker (8)	Andrei Caracut (4)	Smart Araneta Coliseum; 6,502	3–8

== Transactions ==
=== Free agency ===
==== Signings ====
Player	Date signed	Contract amount	Contract length	Former team
Rey Nambatac	November 3, 2021	₱420,000 per month (max. contract)	3 years	Re-signed
Anton Asistio	November 24, 2021	Not disclosed	2 years	Re-signed
Norbert Torres	November 24, 2021	Not disclosed	2 years	Re-signed
Beau Belga	November 26, 2021	Not disclosed	2 years	Re-signed

=== Trades ===
==== Pre-season ====
January
January 20, 2021	To Rain or Shine Bradwyn Guinto	To NorthPort Clint Doliguez; Sidney Onwubere

==== Mid-season ====
December
December 4, 2021	To Rain or Shine Trevis Jackson	To Meralco Franky Johnson

=== Recruited imports ===
Tournament	Name	Debuted	Last game	Record
Governors' Cup	Henry Walker	December 9 (vs. Blackwater)	March 6 (vs. Barangay Ginebra)	3–8
