= 2021 Terrafirma Dyip season =

- Head coach: Johnedel Cardel
- Owner(s): Terrafirma Realty Development Corporation

Philippine Cup results
- Record: 4–7 (36.4%)
- Place: 10th
- Playoff finish: Did not qualify

Governors' Cup results
- Record: 2–9 (18.2%)
- Place: 11th
- Playoff finish: Did not qualify

Terrafirma Dyip seasons

The 2021 Terrafirma Dyip season was the 7th season of the franchise in the Philippine Basketball Association (PBA).

== Key dates ==
- March 14: The PBA season 46 draft was held at the TV5 Media Center in Mandaluyong.

== Draft picks ==
=== Special draft ===
| Pick | Player | Position | Place of birth | College |
|---|---|---|---|---|
| 1 | Jordan Heading | Guard | Australia | California Baptist |

=== Regular draft ===
| Round | Pick | Player | Position | Place of birth | College |
|---|---|---|---|---|---|
| 1 | 1 | Joshua Munzon | Guard/Forward | USA | Cal State Los Angeles |
| 1 | 8 | James Laput | Center | Australia | La Salle |
| 3 | 25 | Dhon Reverente | Forward | Philippines | PMI |
| 4 | 36 | Michael Javelosa | Forward | Philippines | Ateneo |
| 5 | 46 | Immanuel Custodio | Forward | Philippines | Ateneo de Naga |
| 6 | 54 | Terrence Tumalip | Guard | Philippines | TIP |

== Roster ==
2021 Terrafirma Dyip roster
Players
Coaches

| Pos. | # | POB | Name | Height | Weight | DOB (YYYY–MM–DD) | From |
|---|---|---|---|---|---|---|---|
| G | 3 | (Philippines) | Juami Tiongson | 5 ft 10 in (1.78 m) | 175 lb (79 kg) | 1991–02–05 | Ateneo |
| G | 4 | (Philippines) | Gelo Alolino | 6 ft 0 in (1.83 m) | 185 lb (84 kg) | 1994–01–04 | National-U |
| G | 5 | (Philippines) | Alex Cabagnot | 6 ft 0 in (1.83 m) | 185 lb (84 kg) | 1982–12–08 | Hawaiʻi–Hilo |
| G | 6 | (Philippines) | Ed Daquioag | 6 ft 1 in (1.85 m) | 170 lb (77 kg) | 1991–08–18 | UST |
| G | 8 | (Philippines) | JP Calvo | 5 ft 7 in (1.70 m) | | 1997–09–29 | Letran |
| F | 10 | (Sweden) | Andreas Cahilig | 6 ft 5 in (1.96 m) | | 1991–01–22 | EARIST |
| F/C | 11 | (Philippines) | Isaac Go (R) | 6 ft 7 in (2.01 m) | | 1996–06–07 | Ateneo |
| F | 13 | (Philippines) | Eric Camson | 6 ft 4 in (1.93 m) | 228 lb (103 kg) | 1990–05–12 | Adamson |
| F/C | 15 | (United States) | Kyle Pascual | 6 ft 6 in (1.98 m) | 210 lb (95 kg) | 1990–04–13 | San Beda |
| F/C | 17 | (Philippines) | Aldrech Ramos | 6 ft 6 in (1.98 m) | 190 lb (86 kg) | 1988–04–03 | Far Eastern |
| C | 18 | (Philippines) | Joseph Gabayni | 6 ft 5 in (1.96 m) | | 1994–09–28 | Lyceum |
| G | 23 | (Philippines) | Bonbon Batiller | 6 ft 0 in (1.83 m) | | 1994–04–23 | Letran |
| G/F | 24 | (United States) | Joshua Munzon (R) | 6 ft 4 in (1.93 m) | 200 lb (91 kg) | 1995–01–15 | Cal State LA |
| C | 30 | (Philippines) | Christian Balagasay | 6 ft 5 in (1.96 m) | 215 lb (98 kg) | 1996–10–28 | Letran |
| G | 31 | (Philippines) | Reden Celda | 6 ft 0 in (1.83 m) | 165 lb (75 kg) | 1992–03–01 | National-U |

Head coach

- (Philippines) Johnedel Cardel

Assistant coach(es)

- (Philippines) Gian Nazario (1st assistant)
- (Philippines) Raymond Tiongco
- (Philippines) James Tolentino

Team manager

- (Philippines) Ronald Tubid

Legend

- (C) Team captain
- (CI) Commissioner's Cup Import
- (GI) Governors' Cup Import
- (EI) EASL Import
- (DP) Unsigned draft pick
- (FA) Free agent
- (IN) Inactive
- (S) Suspended
- (R) Rookie
- Injured

Roster

== Philippine Cup ==
=== Eliminations ===
==== Standings ====
| Pos | Team | W | L | PCT | GB | Qualification |
|---|---|---|---|---|---|---|
| 1 | TNT Tropang Giga | 10 | 1 | .909 | — | Twice-to-beat in the quarterfinals |
| 2 | Meralco Bolts | 9 | 2 | .818 | 1 | Twice-to-beat in the quarterfinals |
| 3 | Magnolia Pambansang Manok Hotshots | 8 | 3 | .727 | 2 | Best-of-three quarterfinals |
| 4 | San Miguel Beermen | 7 | 4 | .636 | 3 | Best-of-three quarterfinals |
| 5 | NorthPort Batang Pier | 6 | 5 | .545 (Note: Head-to-head record: NorthPort 1–0 Rain or Shine) | 4 | Best-of-three quarterfinals |
| 6 | Rain or Shine Elasto Painters | 6 | 5 | .545 | 4 | Best-of-three quarterfinals |
| 7 | NLEX Road Warriors | 5 | 6 | .455 | 5 | Twice-to-win in the quarterfinals |
| 8 | Barangay Ginebra San Miguel | 4 | 7 | .364 (Note: Head-to-head quotient: Phoenix 1.03, Barangay Ginebra 1.01, Terrafirma 0.96; eighth seed playoff: Barangay Ginebra 95–85 Phoenix) | 6 | Twice-to-win in the quarterfinals |
| 9 | Phoenix Super LPG Fuel Masters | 4 | 7 | .364 | 6 | |
| 10 | Terrafirma Dyip | 4 | 7 | .364 | 6 | |
| 11 | Alaska Aces | 3 | 8 | .273 | 7 | |
| 12 | Blackwater Bossing | 0 | 11 | .000 | 10 | |

Source: PBA.ph
Rules for classification: 1) winning percentage; 2) if two teams are tied, head-to-head record; if three or more teams are tied, head-to-head goal average (quotient), if tied for 8th, one-game playoff; 3) overall quotient 4) coin toss

==== Game log ====
2021 PBA Philippine Cup game log
Total: 4–7
July: 0–3

| Game | Date | Opponent | Score | High points | High rebounds | High assists | Location Attendance | Record |
|---|---|---|---|---|---|---|---|---|
| 1 | July 17 | TNT | L 79–86 | Aldrech Ramos (17) | Adams, Laput (9) | Ganuelas-Rosser, Tiongson (6) | Ynares Sports Arena | 0–1 |
| 2 | July 25 | NLEX | L 94–108 | Joshua Munzon (24) | Roosevelt Adams (11) | Matt Ganuelas-Rosser (7) | Ynares Sports Arena | 0–2 |
| 3 | July 30 | Magnolia | L 83–105 | Roosevelt Adams (25) | Roosevelt Adams (11) | Andreas Cahilig (3) | Ynares Sports Arena | 0–3 |

August: 0–1

| Game | Date | Opponent | Score | High points | High rebounds | High assists | Location Attendance | Record |
|---|---|---|---|---|---|---|---|---|
| 4 | August 1 | Rain or Shine | L 77–83 | Juami Tiongson (20) | Roosevelt Adams (16) | Juami Tiongson (7) | Ynares Sports Arena | 0–4 |

September: 4–3

| Game | Date | Opponent | Score | High points | High rebounds | High assists | Location Attendance | Record |
|---|---|---|---|---|---|---|---|---|
| 5 | September 1 | San Miguel | W 110–104 (OT) | Juami Tiongson (28) | Joseph Gabayni (15) | Juami Tiongson (7) | DHVSU Gym | 1–4 |
| 6 | September 3 | Barangay Ginebra | W 95–90 | Juami Tiongson (31) | Eric Camson (13) | Juami Tiongson (6) | DHVSU Gym | 2–4 |
| 7 | September 5 | Blackwater | W 96–84 | Aldrech Ramos (17) | Andreas Cahilig (11) | Celda, Ganuelas-Rosser, McCarthy (4) | DHVSU Gym | 3–4 |
| 8 | September 9 | Phoenix Super LPG | L 84–96 | Aldrech Ramos (13) | Joseph Gabayni (8) | Matt Ganuelas-Rosser (5) | DHVSU Gym | 3–5 |
| 9 | September 11 | NorthPort | L 84–104 | Adams, Ramos (14) | Aldrech Ramos (8) | Juami Tiongson (3) | DHVSU Gym | 3–6 |
| 10 | September 16 | Meralco | L 83–95 | Aldrech Ramos (15) | Joseph Gabayni (10) | Batiller, Ganuelas-Rosser (4) | DHVSU Gym | 3–7 |
| 11 | September 19 | Alaska | W 105–89 | Rashawn McCarthy (19) | Joseph Gabayni (9) | Reden Celda (7) | DHVSU Gym | 4–7 |

== Governors' Cup ==
=== Eliminations ===
==== Standings ====
| Pos | Team | W | L | PCT | GB | Qualification |
|---|---|---|---|---|---|---|
| 1 | Magnolia Pambansang Manok Hotshots | 9 | 2 | .818 | — | Twice-to-beat in quarterfinals |
| 2 | NLEX Road Warriors | 8 | 3 | .727 | 1 | Twice-to-beat in quarterfinals |
| 3 | TNT Tropang Giga | 7 | 4 | .636 (Note: Head-to-head quotient: TNT 1.07, Meralco 0.99, San Miguel 0.95) | 2 | Twice-to-beat in quarterfinals |
| 4 | Meralco Bolts | 7 | 4 | .636 | 2 | Twice-to-beat in quarterfinals |
| 5 | San Miguel Beermen | 7 | 4 | .636 | 2 | Twice-to-win in quarterfinals |
| 6 | Barangay Ginebra San Miguel | 6 | 5 | .545 (Note: Head-to-head record: Barangay Ginebra 1–0 Alaska) | 3 | Twice-to-win in quarterfinals |
| 7 | Alaska Aces | 6 | 5 | .545 | 3 | Twice-to-win in quarterfinals |
| 8 | Phoenix Super LPG Fuel Masters | 5 | 6 | .455 (Note: Eighth seed playoff: Phoenix 101–98 NorthPort) | 4 | Twice-to-win in quarterfinals |
| 9 | NorthPort Batang Pier | 5 | 6 | .455 | 4 | |
| 10 | Rain or Shine Elasto Painters | 3 | 8 | .273 | 6 | |
| 11 | Terrafirma Dyip | 2 | 9 | .182 | 7 | |
| 12 | Blackwater Bossing | 1 | 10 | .091 | 8 | |

Source: PBA.ph
Rules for classification: 1) winning percentage; 2) if two teams are tied, head-to-head record; if three or more teams are tied, head-to-head goal average (quotient), if tied for 8th, one-game playoff; 3) overall quotient 4) coin toss

==== Game log ====
2021 PBA Governors' Cup game log
Total: 2–9
December: 1–4

| Game | Date | Opponent | Score | High points | High rebounds | High assists | Location Attendance | Record |
|---|---|---|---|---|---|---|---|---|
| 1 | December 9 | Phoenix Super LPG | L 100–103 | Antonio Hester (28) | Antonio Hester (16) | Alex Cabagnot (5) | Ynares Sports Arena | 0–1 |
| 2 | December 11 | Rain or Shine | W 112–106 (OT) | Antonio Hester (40) | Antonio Hester (11) | Alex Cabagnot (11) | Ynares Sports Arena | 1–1 |
| 3 | December 15 | Magnolia | L 87–114 | Antonio Hester (21) | Antonio Hester (8) | Alex Cabagnot (9) | Smart Araneta Coliseum | 1–2 |
| 4 | December 18 | NLEX | L 86–116 | Antonio Hester (27) | Antonio Hester (11) | Alex Cabagnot (5) | Smart Araneta Coliseum | 1–3 |
| 5 | December 26 | San Miguel | L 88–100 | Juami Tiongson (21) | Joseph Gabayni (8) | JP Calvo (6) | Smart Araneta Coliseum | 1–4 |

February: 1–3

| Game | Date | Opponent | Score | High points | High rebounds | High assists | Location Attendance | Record |
|---|---|---|---|---|---|---|---|---|
| 6 | February 12, 2022 | Blackwater | W 109–103 | Antonio Hester (41) | Antonio Hester (13) | JP Calvo (5) | Smart Araneta Coliseum | 2–4 |
| 7 | February 19, 2022 | Alaska | L 97–102 | Antonio Hester (24) | Antonio Hester (14) | Antonio Hester (11) | Smart Araneta Coliseum | 2–5 |
| 8 | February 24, 2022 | Meralco | L 95–107 | Antonio Hester (23) | Antonio Hester (17) | Ed Daquioag (3) | Ynares Center | 2–6 |
| 9 | February 27, 2022 | Barangay Ginebra | L 107–112 | Juami Tiongson (27) | Antonio Hester (11) | Calvo, Munzon (7) | Ynares Center; 3,561 | 2–7 |

March: 0–2

| Game | Date | Opponent | Score | High points | High rebounds | High assists | Location Attendance | Record |
|---|---|---|---|---|---|---|---|---|
| 10 | March 5, 2022 | NorthPort | L 117–124 | Antonio Hester (40) | Antonio Hester (18) | Batiller, Calvo, Munzon, Ramos (2) | Smart Araneta Coliseum | 2–8 |
| 11 | March 9, 2022 | TNT | L 107–127 | Antonio Hester (30) | Antonio Hester (13) | Joshua Munzon (6) | Smart Araneta Coliseum | 2–9 |

== Transactions ==
=== Trades ===
==== Pre-season ====
February
| February 2, 2021 | To Terrafirma Gelo Alolino; Russel Escoto; Matt Ganuelas-Rosser; 2020 San Miguel first-round pick (No. 8); 2022 San Miguel first-round pick | To San Miguel CJ Perez |

==== Philippine Cup ====
July
| July 16, 2021 | To Terrafirma 2022 second-round pick | To Magnolia Russel Escoto |
September
| September 28, 2021 | To Terrafirma Simon Enciso | To Blackwater Rashawn McCarthy |

==== Mid-season ====
November
| November 13, 2021 | To Terrafirma Alex Cabagnot | To San Miguel Simon Enciso |
| November 25, 2021 | To Terrafirma Justin Melton; Kyle Pascual | To Magnolia James Laput |

==== Governors' Cup ====
December
| December 24, 2021 | To Terrafirma Ed Daquioag | To Blackwater Justin Melton |

=== Recruited imports ===
| Tournament | Name | Debuted | Last game | Record |
|---|---|---|---|---|
| Governors' Cup | Antonio Hester | December 9 (vs. Phoenix Super LPG) | March 9 (vs. TNT) | 2–9 |
