= 2021 Magnolia Pambansang Manok Hotshots season =

- Head coach: Chito Victolero
- Owner(s): San Miguel-Pure Foods Co., Inc. (a San Miguel Corporation subsidiary)

Philippine Cup results
- Record: 8–3 (72.7%)
- Place: 3rd
- Playoff finish: Runner-up (lost to TNT, 1–4)

Governors' Cup results
- Record: 9–2 (81.8%)
- Place: 1st
- Playoff finish: Semifinalist (lost to Meralco, 2–3)

Magnolia Pambansang Manok Hotshots seasons

The 2021 Magnolia Pambansang Manok Hotshots season was the 33rd season of the franchise in the Philippine Basketball Association (PBA).

== Key dates ==
- March 14: The PBA season 46 draft was held at the TV5 Media Center in Mandaluyong.

== Draft picks ==
Round	Pick	Player	Position	Place of birth	College
1	10	Jerrick Ahanmisi	G	USA	Adamson
3	30	Ronnie de Leon	F	Philippines	UE
4	41	Andrew Estrella	G	Philippines	Mapúa

== Roster ==
2021 Magnolia Pambansang Manok Hotshots roster
Players
Coaches

Pos.	#	POB	Name	Height	Weight	DOB (YYYY–MM–DD)	From
G	00	(United States)	Loren Brill (R)	6 ft 0 in (1.83 m)		1997–01–14	Old Dominion
F	1	(Philippines)	Jackson Corpuz	6 ft 4 in (1.93 m)	195 lb (88 kg)	1989–02–08	Philippine Christian
G	3	(Philippines)	Paul Lee	6 ft 0 in (1.83 m)	200 lb (91 kg)	1989–02–14	UE
C	4	(United States)	Rafi Reavis (C)	6 ft 8 in (2.03 m)	210 lb (95 kg)	1977–07–26	Coppin State
G	5	(United States)	Jerrick Ahanmisi (R)	6 ft 1 in (1.85 m)	185 lb (84 kg)	1997–10–16	Adamson
G	6	(Philippines)	Jio Jalalon	5 ft 9 in (1.75 m)	150 lb (68 kg)	1992–08–02	Arellano
F/C	10	(Philippines)	Ian Sangalang	6 ft 7 in (2.01 m)	212 lb (96 kg)	1991–12–20	San Sebastian
F	11	(Philippines)	Ronnie de Leon (R)	6 ft 6 in (1.98 m)	210 lb (95 kg)	1994–02–24	UE
F	13	(Philippines)	Calvin Abueva	6 ft 3 in (1.91 m)	209 lb (95 kg)	1988–02–04	San Sebastian
G	14	(Philippines)	Mark Barroca	5 ft 10 in (1.78 m)	170 lb (77 kg)	1986–04–25	Far Eastern
G/F	17	(Philippines)	Alvin Capobres	6 ft 2 in (1.88 m)		1994–08–19	San Sebastian
F	19	(United States)	Rome dela Rosa	6 ft 3 in (1.91 m)	185 lb (84 kg)	1990–12–11	San Beda
G/F	21	(United States)	Adrian Wong	6 ft 0 in (1.83 m)	175 lb (79 kg)	1996–02–10	Ateneo
C	42	(Australia)	James Laput (R)	6 ft 10 in (2.08 m)	245 lb (111 kg)	1996–08–26	De La Salle
F	57	(Philippines)	Aris Dionisio	6 ft 5 in (1.96 m)		1995–07–21	St. Clare
F/C	88	(Philippines)	Russel Escoto	6 ft 6 in (1.98 m)	200 lb (91 kg)	1992–12–04	Far Eastern

Head coach

- (Philippines) Chito Victolero

Assistant coach(es)

- (Philippines) Jason Webb (1st Assistant)
- (Philippines) Johnny Abarrientos
- (Philippines) Antonio Espinosa
- (Philippines) Mon Jose
- (Philippines) Juno Sauler
- (Philippines) Angelito Esguerra
- (Philippines) Paul Sorongon

Team manager

- (Philippines) Alvin Patrimonio

Legend

- (C) Team captain
- (CI) Commissioner's Cup Import
- (GI) Governors' Cup Import
- (EI) EASL Import
- (DP) Unsigned draft pick
- (FA) Free agent
- (IN) Inactive
- (S) Suspended
- (R) Rookie
- Injured

Roster

== Philippine Cup ==
=== Eliminations ===
==== Standings ====
Pos	Team	W	L	PCT	GB	Qualification
1	TNT Tropang Giga	10	1	.909	—	Twice-to-beat in the quarterfinals
2	Meralco Bolts	9	2	.818	1	Twice-to-beat in the quarterfinals
3	Magnolia Pambansang Manok Hotshots	8	3	.727	2	Best-of-three quarterfinals
4	San Miguel Beermen	7	4	.636	3	Best-of-three quarterfinals
5	NorthPort Batang Pier	6	5	.545 (Note: Head-to-head record: NorthPort 1–0 Rain or Shine)	4	Best-of-three quarterfinals
6	Rain or Shine Elasto Painters	6	5	.545	4	Best-of-three quarterfinals
7	NLEX Road Warriors	5	6	.455	5	Twice-to-win in the quarterfinals
8	Barangay Ginebra San Miguel	4	7	.364 (Note: Head-to-head quotient: Phoenix 1.03, Barangay Ginebra 1.01, Terrafirma 0.96; eighth seed playoff: Barangay Ginebra 95–85 Phoenix)	6	Twice-to-win in the quarterfinals
9	Phoenix Super LPG Fuel Masters	4	7	.364	6	
10	Terrafirma Dyip	4	7	.364	6	
11	Alaska Aces	3	8	.273	7	
12	Blackwater Bossing	0	11	.000	10	

Source: PBA.ph
Rules for classification: 1) winning percentage; 2) if two teams are tied, head-to-head record; if three or more teams are tied, head-to-head goal average (quotient), if tied for 8th, one-game playoff; 3) overall quotient 4) coin toss

==== Game log ====
2021 PBA Philippine Cup game log
Total: 8–3
July: 4–0

Game	Date	Opponent	Score	High points	High rebounds	High assists	Location Attendance	Record
1	July 17	Phoenix Super LPG	W 80–73	Calvin Abueva (26)	Calvin Abueva (10)	Jio Jalalon (6)	Ynares Sports Arena	1–0
2	July 21	Alaska	W 84–82	Ian Sangalang (26)	Calvin Abueva (10)	Mark Barroca (6)	Ynares Sports Arena	2–0
3	July 25	Barangay Ginebra	W 89–79	Paul Lee (22)	Corpuz, Reavis (12)	Mark Barroca (6)	Ynares Sports Arena	3–0
4	July 30	Terrafirma	W 105–83	Ian Sangalang (18)	Calvin Abueva (8)	Jio Jalalon (9)	Ynares Sports Arena	4–0

September: 4–3

Game	Date	Opponent	Score	High points	High rebounds	High assists	Location Attendance	Record
5	September 1	Meralco	L 94–95	Paul Lee (21)	Calvin Abueva (14)	Mark Barroca (4)	DHVSU Gym	4–1
6	September 3	Blackwater	W 94–78	Barroca, Sangalang (16)	Calvin Abueva (10)	Mark Barroca (7)	DHVSU Gym	5–1
7	September 5	TNT	L 76–83	Calvin Abueva (23)	Ian Sangalang (10)	Jio Jalalon (4)	DHVSU Gym	5–2
8	September 8	NLEX	W 112–105 (2OT)	Calvin Abueva (23)	Calvin Abueva (12)	Jio Jalalon (9)	DHVSU Gym	6–2
9	September 10	Rain or Shine	L 72–75	Ian Sangalang (21)	Calvin Abueva (13)	Paul Lee (5)	DHVSU Gym	6–3
10	September 17	NorthPort	W 90–89	Ian Sangalang (26)	Ian Sangalang (10)	Mark Barroca (8)	DHVSU Gym	7–3
11	September 19	San Miguel	W 100–90	Paul Lee (32)	Ian Sangalang (12)	Paul Lee (5)	DHVSU Gym	8–3

=== Playoffs ===
==== Bracket ====
Quarterfinals
(#1 twice-to-beat)
1	TNT	84
8	Barangay Ginebra	71
(Best-of-3)
4	San Miguel	2
5	NorthPort	0
(#2 twice-to-beat)
2	Meralco	80	97
7	NLEX	81	86
(Best-of-3)
3	Magnolia	2
6	Rain or Shine	0

Semifinals (Best-of-7)
1	TNT	4
4	San Miguel	3
2	Meralco	2
3	Magnolia	4

Finals (Best-of-7)
1	TNT	4
3	Magnolia	1

==== Game log ====
2021 PBA Philippine Cup playoffs game log
Total: 7–6
Quarterfinals: 2–0

Game	Date	Opponent	Score	High points	High rebounds	High assists	Location Attendance	Series
1	September 26	Rain or Shine	W 81–70	Paul Lee (20)	Abueva, Sangalang (13)	Mark Barroca (5)	DHVSU Gym	1–0
2	September 30	Rain or Shine	W 96–86	Paul Lee (24)	Calvin Abueva (19)	Jio Jalalon (6)	DHVSU Gym	2–0

Semifinals: 4–2

Game	Date	Opponent	Score	High points	High rebounds	High assists	Location Attendance	Series
1	October 3	Meralco	W 88–79	Ian Sangalang (18)	Rafi Reavis (10)	Mark Barroca (6)	DHVSU Gym	1–0
2	October 6	Meralco	W 92–78	Paul Lee (28)	Calvin Abueva (11)	Mark Barroca (6)	DHVSU Gym	2–0
3	October 8	Meralco	L 86–91	Paul Lee (18)	Abueva, Sangalang (7)	Jio Jalalon (9)	DHVSU Gym	2–1
4	October 10	Meralco	W 81–69	Abueva, Barroca, Sangalang (17)	Calvin Abueva (12)	Mark Barroca (6)	DHVSU Gym	3–1
5	October 13	Meralco	L 98–102	Mark Barroca (25)	Ian Sangalang (14)	Calvin Abueva (6)	DHVSU Gym	3–2
6	October 15	Meralco	W 93–85	Ian Sangalang (19)	Ian Sangalang (14)	Ian Sangalang (6)	DHVSU Gym	4–2

Finals: 1–4

Game	Date	Opponent	Score	High points	High rebounds	High assists	Location Attendance	Series
1	October 20	TNT	L 70–88	Corpuz, Lee (12)	Abueva, Corpuz (11)	Jio Jalalon (3)	DHVSU Gym	0–1
2	October 22	TNT	L 93–105	Ian Sangalang (25)	Calvin Abueva (11)	Jio Jalalon (8)	DHVSU Gym	0–2
3	October 24	TNT	W 106–98	Paul Lee (21)	Rafi Reavis (9)	Ian Sangalang (5)	DHVSU Gym	1–2
4	October 27	TNT	L 89–106	Calvin Abueva (28)	Ian Sangalang (10)	Jio Jalalon (8)	DHVSU Gym	1–3
5	October 29	TNT	L 79–94	Ian Sangalang (18)	Rafi Reavis (10)	Mark Barroca (6)	DHVSU Gym	1–4

== Governors' Cup ==
=== Eliminations ===
==== Standings ====
Pos	Team	W	L	PCT	GB	Qualification
1	Magnolia Pambansang Manok Hotshots	9	2	.818	—	Twice-to-beat in quarterfinals
2	NLEX Road Warriors	8	3	.727	1	Twice-to-beat in quarterfinals
3	TNT Tropang Giga	7	4	.636 (Note: Head-to-head quotient: TNT 1.07, Meralco 0.99, San Miguel 0.95)	2	Twice-to-beat in quarterfinals
4	Meralco Bolts	7	4	.636	2	Twice-to-beat in quarterfinals
5	San Miguel Beermen	7	4	.636	2	Twice-to-win in quarterfinals
6	Barangay Ginebra San Miguel	6	5	.545 (Note: Head-to-head record: Barangay Ginebra 1–0 Alaska)	3	Twice-to-win in quarterfinals
7	Alaska Aces	6	5	.545	3	Twice-to-win in quarterfinals
8	Phoenix Super LPG Fuel Masters	5	6	.455 (Note: Eighth seed playoff: Phoenix 101–98 NorthPort)	4	Twice-to-win in quarterfinals
9	NorthPort Batang Pier	5	6	.455	4	
10	Rain or Shine Elasto Painters	3	8	.273	6	
11	Terrafirma Dyip	2	9	.182	7	
12	Blackwater Bossing	1	10	.091	8	

Source: PBA.ph
Rules for classification: 1) winning percentage; 2) if two teams are tied, head-to-head record; if three or more teams are tied, head-to-head goal average (quotient), if tied for 8th, one-game playoff; 3) overall quotient 4) coin toss

==== Game log ====
2021 PBA Governors' Cup game log
Total: 9–2
December: 3–0

Game	Date	Opponent	Score	High points	High rebounds	High assists	Location Attendance	Record
1	December 15	Terrafirma	W 114–87	Mike Harris (30)	Mike Harris (15)	Mark Barroca (7)	Smart Araneta Coliseum	1–0
2	December 19	Rain or Shine	W 109–98	Mike Harris (26)	Calvin Abueva (9)	Jio Jalalon (10)	Smart Araneta Coliseum	2–0
3	December 25	Barangay Ginebra	W 117–94	Mike Harris (29)	Mike Harris (15)	Jio Jalalon (9)	Smart Araneta Coliseum; 4,843	3–0

February: 4–1

Game	Date	Opponent	Score	High points	High rebounds	High assists	Location Attendance	Record
4	February 11, 2022	TNT	W 96–93	Mike Harris (41)	Mike Harris (18)	Mark Barroca (7)	Smart Araneta Coliseum	4–0
5	February 16, 2022	NLEX	W 112–109	Mike Harris (31)	Mike Harris (10)	Jio Jalalon (11)	Smart Araneta Coliseum	5–0
6	February 19, 2022	Phoenix Super LPG	W 103–83	Mike Harris (20)	Mike Harris (13)	Barroca, Jalalon (7)	Smart Araneta Coliseum	6–0
7	February 24, 2022	NorthPort	L 101–103	Mike Harris (34)	Mike Harris (12)	Mark Barroca (8)	Ynares Center	6–1
8	February 27, 2022	San Miguel	W 104–87	Harris, Lee (26)	Mike Harris (13)	Mark Barroca (9)	Ynares Center; 3,561	7–1

March: 2–1

Game	Date	Opponent	Score	High points	High rebounds	High assists	Location Attendance	Record
9	March 2, 2022	Meralco	W 88–85	Mike Harris (30)	Mike Harris (22)	Jio Jalalon (7)	Smart Araneta Coliseum	8–1
10	March 6, 2022	Alaska	W 118–91	Mike Harris (38)	Mike Harris (10)	Jio Jalalon (11)	Smart Araneta Coliseum; 6,502	9–1
11	March 9, 2022	Blackwater	L 100–101	Mark Barroca (27)	Mike Harris (17)	Barroca, Lee (4)	Smart Araneta Coliseum	9–2

=== Playoffs ===
==== Bracket ====
Quarterfinals (Top 4 twice-to-beat)
1	Magnolia	127
8	Phoenix Super LPG	88
4	Meralco	100
5	San Miguel	85
2	NLEX	79	96
7	Alaska	93	80
3	TNT	92	95
6	Barangay Ginebra	104	115

Semifinals (Best-of-5)
1	Magnolia	2
4	Meralco	3
2	NLEX	1
6	Barangay Ginebra	3

Finals (Best-of-7)
4	Meralco	2
6	Barangay Ginebra	4

==== Game log ====
2021 PBA Governors' playoffs game log
Total: 3–3
Quarterfinals: 1–0

Game	Date	Opponent	Score	High points	High rebounds	High assists	Location Attendance	Series
1	March 18, 2022	Phoenix Super LPG	W 127–88	Paul Lee (25)	Calvin Abueva (9)	Mark Barroca (7)	Smart Araneta Coliseum	1–0

Semifinals: 2–3

Game	Date	Opponent	Score	High points	High rebounds	High assists	Location Attendance	Series
1	March 23, 2022	Meralco	W 94–80	Mike Harris (26)	Mike Harris (16)	Jio Jalalon (6)	SM Mall of Asia Arena	1–0
2	March 25, 2022	Meralco	L 75–81	Mike Harris (25)	Mike Harris (17)	Jio Jalalon (6)	SM Mall of Asia Arena	1–1
3	March 27, 2022	Meralco	L 95–101	Mike Harris (24)	Mike Harris (17)	Mark Barroca (6)	SM Mall of Asia Arena; 13,272	1–2
4	March 30, 2022	Meralco	W 94–73	Mike Harris (34)	Mike Harris (18)	Jio Jalalon (7)	Smart Araneta Coliseum; 10,353	2–2
5	April 1, 2022	Meralco	L 81–94	Calvin Abueva (21)	Mike Harris (11)	Jio Jalalon (6)	Smart Araneta Coliseum	2–3

== Transactions ==
=== Free agency ===
==== Signings ====
Player	Date signed	Contract amount	Contract length	Former team
Mark Barroca	January 14, 2021	Not disclosed	3 years	Re-signed
Rome dela Rosa	November 27, 2021	Not disclosed	3 years	Re-signed
Russel Escoto	November 30, 2021	Not disclosed	1 year	Re-signed

=== Trades ===
==== Pre-season ====
February
February 17, 2021	To Magnolia Calvin Abueva; 2020 Phoenix first-round pick (No. 10)	To Phoenix Chris Banchero; 2020 Magnolia first-round pick (No. 6); 2020 Magnolia second-round pick (No. 18)

==== Philippine Cup ====
July
July 16, 2021	To Magnolia Russel Escoto	To Terrafirma 2022 second-round pick

==== Mid-season ====
November
November 25, 2021	To Magnolia James Laput	To Terrafirma Justin Melton; Kyle Pascual

=== Recruited imports ===
Tournament	Name	Debuted	Last game	Record
Governors' Cup	Mike Harris	December 15, 2021 (vs. Terrafirma)	April 1, 2022 (vs. Meralco)	12–5
