= Nick Demusis =

Filipino-American basketball player

No. 7 – Blackwater Bossing
- Position: Small forward / power forward
- League: PBA

Personal information
- Born: May 9, 1991 (age 35) Leyte, Philippines
- Listed height: 6 ft 4 in (1.93 m)
- Listed weight: 205 lb (93 kg)

Career information
- College: Whittier
- PBA draft: 2020: 2nd round, 18th overall pick
- Drafted by: Phoenix Super LPG Fuel Masters
- Playing career: 2019–present

Career history
- 2019–2020: Bacoor City Strikers
- 2021–2022: Phoenix Super LPG Fuel Masters
- 2022–2025: Rain or Shine Elasto Painters
- 2025: Nueva Ecija Rice Vanguards
- 2026–present: Blackwater Bossing

Nick Demusis (born May 9, 1991) is a Filipino-American professional basketball player for the Blackwater Bossing of the Philippine Basketball Association (PBA).

Born in Leyte and later residing in Hawaii, he played his collegiate career in the United States. In 2019, he made his way to the Philippine domestic basketball scene, first in the Maharlika Pilipinas Basketball League (MPBL) before getting drafted to the PBA in 2021.

== College and amateur career ==
Before making his way to Philippine domestic basketball, Demusis played for Whittier College, a Division III school. In 2019, he began playing in his lone season in the then-amateur Maharlika Pilipinas Basketball League (MPBL). Playing for the Bacoor City Strikers, he scored 8.3 points per game on an average of 17.4 minutes per game.

== Professional career ==
=== Phoenix Super LPG Fuel Masters (2021–2022) ===
On January 8, 2021, Demusis submitted his application for the PBA season 46 draft, where he would be selected with the 18th overall pick by the Phoenix Super LPG Fuel Masters.

=== Rain or Shine Elasto Painters (2022–2025) ===
Ahead of the 2022 PBA Philippine Cup, Phoenix traded Demusis and two future second-round draft picks to the Rain or Shine Elasto Painters in exchange for Javee Mocon.

On May 31, 2025, Demusis was let go by Rain or Shine after his contract was not renewed.

=== Nueva Ecija Rice Vanguards (2025) ===
On June 17, 2025, Demusis signed with the Nueva Ecija Rice Vanguards.

After his stint with Nueva Ecija, he would join the Zamboanga Valientes for the Dubai International Basketball Invitational. During the tournament, he was attacked by Ismael Romero during a game against Al Ahli Tripoli. The Valientes have since filed a police complaint against Romero for the attack.

== Career statistics ==
=== PBA ===
Legend
GP	Games played	MPG	Minutes per game	FG%	Field-goal percentage
3FG%	3-point field-goal percentage	4P%	4-point field-goal percentage	FT%	Free-throw percentage
RPG	Rebounds per game	APG	Assists per game	SPG	Steals per game
BPG	Blocks per game	PPG	Points per game	**127**	Career high

As of the end of 2025–26 season

==== Season-by-season averages ====
Year	Team	GP	MPG	FG%	3P%	4P%	FT%	RPG	APG	SPG	BPG	PPG
2021	Phoenix Super LPG	23	10.0	**.509**	.125	—	.625	2.9	.3	.3	.1	2.9
2022–23	Rain or Shine	**31**	14.5	.470	.238	—	.762	**4.3**	**1.2**	**.4**	.1	**5.4**
2023–24	Rain or Shine	27	11.7	.420	.258	—	.565	2.0	.6	**.4**	.1	3.3
2024–25	Rain or Shine	7	8.7	.357	**.375**	.000	**1.000**	1.1	.1	.3	**.3**	2.4
2025–26	Blackwater	9	**17.4**	.324	.000	—	.875	3.3	.8	.1	**.3**	3.2
Career		97	12.5	.443	.222	.000	.710	3.0	.7	.3	.1	3.8

=== MPBL ===
Legend
GP	Games played	GS	Games started	MPG	Minutes per game
FG%	Field-goal percentage	3P%	3-point field-goal percentage	FT%	Free-throw percentage
RPG	Rebounds per game	APG	Assists per game	SPG	Steals per game
BPG	Blocks per game	PPG	Points per game	**Bold**	Career high

As of the end of 2019–20 season

==== Season-by-season averages ====
Year	Team	GP	GS	MPG	FG%	3P%	FT%	RPG	APG	SPG	BPG	PPG
2019–20	Bacoor City	19	14	17.4	.469	.406	.667	3.1	1.1	.5	.3	8.3
