= 2021 NorthPort Batang Pier season =

- Head coach: Bonnie Tan (3 games); Pido Jarencio
- Owner(s): Sultan 900 Capital, Inc.

Philippine Cup results
- Record: 6–5 (54.5%)
- Place: 5th
- Playoff finish: Quarterfinalist (lost to San Miguel, 0–2)

Governors' Cup results
- Record: 5–6 (45.5%)
- Place: 9th
- Playoff finish: Did not qualify

NorthPort Batang Pier seasons

The 2021 NorthPort Batang Pier season was the 9th season of the franchise in the Philippine Basketball Association (PBA).

== Key dates ==
- March 14: The PBA season 46 draft was held at the TV5 Media Center in Mandaluyong.

== Draft picks ==
=== Special draft ===
Pick	Player	Position	Place of birth	College
2	William Navarro	Forward	Greece	Ateneo

=== Regular draft ===
Round	Pick	Player	Position	Place of birth	School
1	2	Jamie Malonzo	Forward	USA	La Salle
1	11	Troy Rike	Center/Forward	USA	NU
2	24	Mark Olayon	Forward	Philippines	UE
3	26	Loren Brill	Guard	USA	Old Dominion
4	37	Marvin Moraga	Guard	Philippines	St. Xavier
5	47	Carl Bryan Ravanes	Guard	Philippines	Southville
6	55	Seraj Elmejrab	Center	Libya	Lyceum
7	59	Jonico Rosales	Guard	Philippines	AMA
8	61	Jed Mendoza	Guard	Philippines	UE

== Roster ==
2021 NorthPort Batang Pier roster
Players
Coaches

Pos.	#	POB	Name	Height	Weight	DOB (YYYY–MM–DD)	From
G/F	0	(Philippines)	Paolo Taha	6 ft 0 in (1.83 m)	180 lb (82 kg)	1990–12–05	St. Benilde
G	2	(Philippines)	Alvin Abundo	5 ft 8 in (1.73 m)	150 lb (68 kg)	1992–10–29	Centro Escolar
F	3	(United States)	Jamie Malonzo (R)	6 ft 6 in (1.98 m)	210 lb (95 kg)	1996–07–31	De La Salle
G	5	(Philippines)	Renzo Subido	5 ft 9 in (1.75 m)	135 lb (61 kg)	1996–02–17	UST
G	6	(Philippines)	Roi Sumang	5 ft 8 in (1.73 m)	160 lb (73 kg)	1990–12–12	UE
G	7	(Philippines)	Jerrick Balanza	6 ft 1 in (1.85 m)	190 lb (86 kg)	1996–09–06	Letran
G	8	(Philippines)	Robert Bolick	6 ft 1 in (1.85 m)	178 lb (81 kg)	1995–09–13	San Beda
G	11	(Philippines)	Clint Doliguez	6 ft 1 in (1.85 m)	188 lb (85 kg)	1994-05-27	San Beda
G/F	14	(Philippines)	Jonathan Grey	6 ft 3 in (1.91 m)	190 lb (86 kg)	1992–01–13	St. Benilde
F	18	(Philippines)	Arthur dela Cruz	6 ft 4 in (1.93 m)	210 lb (95 kg)	1992–05–09	San Beda
F/C	19	(Philippines)	Cris Dumapig (R)	6 ft 4 in (1.93 m)		1989–12–25	Southwestern-U
F	20	(Philippines)	Jervy Cruz	6 ft 4 in (1.93 m)	220 lb (100 kg)	1986–09–09	UST
C	21	(United States)	Troy Rike (R)	6 ft 8 in (2.03 m)	225 lb (102 kg)	1995–10–05	National-U
F	29	(Philippines)	Arwind Santos	6 ft 4 in (1.93 m)	175 lb (79 kg)	1981–06–10	Far Eastern
F	77	(Philippines)	Kevin Ferrer	6 ft 5 in (1.96 m)	188 lb (85 kg)	1993–03–26	UST

Head coach

- (Philippines) Pido Jarencio

Assistant coach(es)

- (Philippines) Rensy Bajar (1st assistant)
- (Philippines) Jeff Napa
- (Philippines) Alfredo Jarencio II

Team manager

- (Philippines) Bonnie Tan
- (Philippines) Waiyip Chong (assistant)

Legend

- (C) Team captain
- (CI) Commissioner's Cup Import
- (GI) Governors' Cup Import
- (EI) EASL Import
- (DP) Unsigned draft pick
- (FA) Free agent
- (IN) Inactive
- (S) Suspended
- (R) Rookie
- Injured

Roster

== Philippine Cup ==
=== Eliminations ===
==== Standings ====
Pos	Team	W	L	PCT	GB	Qualification
1	TNT Tropang Giga	10	1	.909	—	Twice-to-beat in the quarterfinals
2	Meralco Bolts	9	2	.818	1	Twice-to-beat in the quarterfinals
3	Magnolia Pambansang Manok Hotshots	8	3	.727	2	Best-of-three quarterfinals
4	San Miguel Beermen	7	4	.636	3	Best-of-three quarterfinals
5	NorthPort Batang Pier	6	5	.545 (Note: Head-to-head record: NorthPort 1–0 Rain or Shine)	4	Best-of-three quarterfinals
6	Rain or Shine Elasto Painters	6	5	.545	4	Best-of-three quarterfinals
7	NLEX Road Warriors	5	6	.455	5	Twice-to-win in the quarterfinals
8	Barangay Ginebra San Miguel	4	7	.364 (Note: Head-to-head quotient: Phoenix 1.03, Barangay Ginebra 1.01, Terrafirma 0.96; eighth seed playoff: Barangay Ginebra 95–85 Phoenix)	6	Twice-to-win in the quarterfinals
9	Phoenix Super LPG Fuel Masters	4	7	.364	6	
10	Terrafirma Dyip	4	7	.364	6	
11	Alaska Aces	3	8	.273	7	
12	Blackwater Bossing	0	11	.000	10	

Source: PBA.ph
Rules for classification: 1) winning percentage; 2) if two teams are tied, head-to-head record; if three or more teams are tied, head-to-head goal average (quotient), if tied for 8th, one-game playoff; 3) overall quotient 4) coin toss

==== Game log ====
2021 PBA Philippine Cup game log
Total: 6–5
July: 1–3

Game	Date	Opponent	Score	High points	High rebounds	High assists	Location Attendance	Record
1	July 16	Meralco	L 63–85	Sidney Onwubere (13)	Bolick, Malonzo (9)	Bolick, Ferrer (3)	Ynares Sports Arena	0–1
2	July 21	Phoenix Super LPG	W 115–79	Bolick, Ferrer, Rike (20)	Ferrer, Onwubere (9)	Robert Bolick (11)	Ynares Sports Arena	1–1
3	July 25	San Miguel	L 86–88	Greg Slaughter (23)	Greg Slaughter (17)	Robert Bolick (6)	Ynares Sports Arena	1–2
4	July 30	Barangay Ginebra	L 85–87	Robert Bolick (23)	Greg Slaughter (14)	Robert Bolick (4)	Ynares Sports Arena	1–3

September: 5–2

Game	Date	Opponent	Score	High points	High rebounds	High assists	Location Attendance	Record
5	September 9	Blackwater	W 98–73	Bolick, Malonzo (17)	Jamie Malonzo (12)	Robert Bolick (7)	DHVSU Gym	2–3
6	September 11	Terrafirma	W 104–84	Garvo Lanete (18)	Sidney Onwubere (9)	Robert Bolick (8)	DHVSU Gym	3–3
7	September 12	NLEX	W 96–94	Robert Bolick (26)	Jamie Malonzo (14)	Bolick, Malonzo (5)	DHVSU Gym	4–3
8	September 15	TNT	L 92–102	Paolo Taha (20)	Ferrer, Malonzo, Rike (6)	Robert Bolick (11)	DHVSU Gym	4–4
9	September 17	Magnolia	L 89–90	Greg Slaughter (21)	Paolo Taha (9)	Jamie Malonzo (7)	DHVSU Gym	4–5
10	September 19	Rain or Shine	W 91–88 (OT)	Greg Slaughter (25)	Jamie Malonzo (14)	Robert Bolick (7)	DHVSU Gym	5–5
11	September 23	Alaska	W 122–94	Robert Bolick (22)	Robert Bolick (13)	Robert Bolick (13)	DHVSU Gym	6–5

=== Playoffs ===
==== Bracket ====
Quarterfinals
(#1 twice-to-beat)
1	TNT	84
8	Barangay Ginebra	71
(Best-of-3)
4	San Miguel	2
5	NorthPort	0
(#2 twice-to-beat)
2	Meralco	80	97
7	NLEX	81	86
(Best-of-3)
3	Magnolia	2
6	Rain or Shine	0

Semifinals (Best-of-7)
1	TNT	4
4	San Miguel	3
2	Meralco	2
3	Magnolia	4

Finals (Best-of-7)
1	TNT	4
3	Magnolia	1

==== Game log ====
2021 PBA Philippine Cup playoffs game log
Total: 0–2
Quarterfinals: 0–2

Game	Date	Opponent	Score	High points	High rebounds	High assists	Location Attendance	Series
1	September 26	San Miguel	L 87–88	Sean Anthony (17)	Greg Slaughter (10)	Robert Bolick (7)	DHVSU Gym	0–1
2	September 30	San Miguel	L 95–100	Greg Slaughter (27)	Greg Slaughter (12)	Robert Bolick (14)	DHVSU Gym	0–2

== Governors' Cup ==
=== Eliminations ===
==== Standings ====
Pos	Team	W	L	PCT	GB	Qualification
1	Magnolia Pambansang Manok Hotshots	9	2	.818	—	Twice-to-beat in quarterfinals
2	NLEX Road Warriors	8	3	.727	1	Twice-to-beat in quarterfinals
3	TNT Tropang Giga	7	4	.636 (Note: Head-to-head quotient: TNT 1.07, Meralco 0.99, San Miguel 0.95)	2	Twice-to-beat in quarterfinals
4	Meralco Bolts	7	4	.636	2	Twice-to-beat in quarterfinals
5	San Miguel Beermen	7	4	.636	2	Twice-to-win in quarterfinals
6	Barangay Ginebra San Miguel	6	5	.545 (Note: Head-to-head record: Barangay Ginebra 1–0 Alaska)	3	Twice-to-win in quarterfinals
7	Alaska Aces	6	5	.545	3	Twice-to-win in quarterfinals
8	Phoenix Super LPG Fuel Masters	5	6	.455 (Note: Eighth seed playoff: Phoenix 101–98 NorthPort)	4	Twice-to-win in quarterfinals
9	NorthPort Batang Pier	5	6	.455	4	
10	Rain or Shine Elasto Painters	3	8	.273	6	
11	Terrafirma Dyip	2	9	.182	7	
12	Blackwater Bossing	1	10	.091	8	

Source: PBA.ph
Rules for classification: 1) winning percentage; 2) if two teams are tied, head-to-head record; if three or more teams are tied, head-to-head goal average (quotient), if tied for 8th, one-game playoff; 3) overall quotient 4) coin toss

==== Game log ====
2021 PBA Governors' Cup game log
Total: 5–6
December: 0–4

Game	Date	Opponent	Score	High points	High rebounds	High assists	Location Attendance	Record
1	December 8	Alaska	L 85–87	Arwind Santos (23)	Cameron Forte (15)	Robert Bolick (9)	Ynares Sports Arena	0–1
2	December 10	NLEX	L 115–120 (OT)	Greg Slaughter (22)	Cameron Forte (23)	Robert Bolick (14)	Ynares Sports Arena	0–2
3	December 12	San Miguel	L 88–91	Robert Bolick (24)	Jamie Malonzo (13)	Robert Bolick (8)	Ynares Sports Arena	0–3
4	December 17	Barangay Ginebra	L 82–108	Robert Bolick (32)	Greg Slaughter (15)	Robert Bolick (6)	Smart Araneta Coliseum	0–4

February: 3–1

Game	Date	Opponent	Score	High points	High rebounds	High assists	Location Attendance	Record
5	February 12, 2022	Rain or Shine	L 90–104	Artis, Ferrer (23)	Arwind Santos (13)	Roi Sumang (6)	Smart Araneta Coliseum	0–5
6	February 17, 2022	Meralco	W 109–98	Jamel Artis (26)	Arwind Santos (10)	Bolick, Sumang (6)	Smart Araneta Coliseum	1–5
7	February 24, 2022	Magnolia	W 103–101	Jamel Artis (42)	Jamel Artis (9)	Jamel Artis (8)	Ynares Center	2–5
8	February 26, 2022	Phoenix Super LPG	W 101–93	Jamel Artis (29)	Jamie Malonzo (16)	Jerrick Balanza (6)	Ynares Center	3–5

March: 2–1

Game	Date	Opponent	Score	High points	High rebounds	High assists	Location Attendance	Record
9	March 2, 2022	Blackwater	W 116–103	Robert Bolick (30)	Arwind Santos (13)	Jamel Artis (9)	Smart Araneta Coliseum	4–5
10	March 5, 2022	Terrafirma	W 124–117	Jamel Artis (31)	Jamie Malonzo (12)	Robert Bolick (17)	Smart Araneta Coliseum	5–5
11	March 11, 2022	TNT	L 101–106 (OT)	Jamel Artis (39)	Jamie Malonzo (15)	Robert Bolick (6)	Smart Araneta Coliseum	5–6

=== Playoffs ===
==== Bracket ====
Quarterfinals (Top 4 twice-to-beat)
1	Magnolia	127
8	Phoenix Super LPG	88
4	Meralco	100
5	San Miguel	85
2	NLEX	79	96
7	Alaska	93	80
3	TNT	92	95
6	Barangay Ginebra	104	115

Semifinals (Best-of-5)
1	Magnolia	2
4	Meralco	3
2	NLEX	1
6	Barangay Ginebra	3

Finals (Best-of-7)
4	Meralco	2
6	Barangay Ginebra	4

==== Game log ====
2021 PBA Governors' Cup playoffs game log
Total: 0–1
8th seed playoff: 0–1

Game	Date	Opponent	Score	High points	High rebounds	High assists	Location Attendance	Series
1	March 13, 2022	Phoenix Super LPG	L 98–101	Jamel Artis (21)	Jamel Artis (12)	Robert Bolick (7)	Smart Araneta Coliseum	0–1

== Transactions ==
=== Trades ===
==== Pre-season ====
January
January 20, 2021	To NorthPort Clint Doliguez; Sidney Onwubere	To Rain or Shine Bradwyn Guinto
March
March 5, 2021	To NorthPort Greg Slaughter	To Barangay Ginebra Christian Standhardinger
March 12, 2021	To NorthPort Jerrick Balanza; 2020 Barangay Ginebra second-round pick	To Barangay Ginebra 2020 Terrafirma second-round pick

==== Mid-season ====
November
November 5, 2021	To NorthPort Michael Calisaan; Vic Manuel	To Phoenix Sean Anthony; Sean Manganti; 2021 TNT second-round pick
November 8, 2021	To NorthPort Arwind Santos	To San Miguel Vic Manuel
November 9, 2021	To NorthPort Arthur dela Cruz	To Barangay Ginebra Sidney Onwubere

=== Recruited imports ===
Tournament	Name	Debuted	Last game	Record
Governors' Cup	Cameron Forte	December 8 (vs. Alaska)	December 10 (vs. NLEX)	0–2
Governors' Cup	Jamel Artis	February 12, 2022 (vs. Rain or Shine)	March 13, 2022 (vs. Phoenix Super LPG)	5–3
