= 2022 PBA Philippine Cup finals =

2022 edition of the PBA Philippine Cup finals

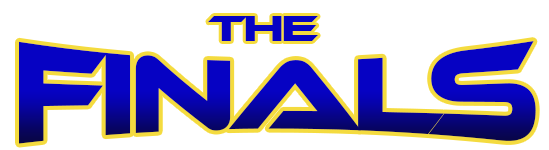
Team	Coach	Wins
(1) San Miguel Beermen	Leo Austria	4
(2) TNT Tropang Giga	Chot Reyes	3
- Dates: August 21 – September 4, 2022
- MVP: June Mar Fajardo (San Miguel Beermen)
- Television: Local: One Sports; TV5; PBA Rush (HD); International: AksyonTV International iWantTFC (Note: Live on iWantTFC worldwide excluding Philippines and United States)
- Announcers: see Broadcast notes
- Radio network: Radyo5 (DWFM)
- Announcers: see Broadcast notes

Referees
- Game 1: Nol Quilinguen, Sherwin Pineda, Jerry Narandan, Joel Baldago
- Game 2: Nol Quilinguen, Sherwin Pineda, Bing Oliva, Dacx Dacanay
- Game 3: Sherwin Pineda, Rommel Gruta, Jerry Narandan, Joel Baldago
- Game 4: Peter Balao, Rommel Gruta, Mike Flordeliza, Jeffrey Tantay
- Game 5: Nol Quilinguen, Sherwin Pineda, Jerry Narandan, Albert Nubla
- Game 6: Sherwin Pineda, Jerry Narandan, Mike Flordeliza, Joel Baldago
- Game 7: Nol Quilinguen, Mike Flordeliza, Janine Nicandro, Albert Nubla

PBA Philippine Cup finals chronology
- < 2021 2024 >

PBA finals chronology
- < 2021 Governors' 2022–23 Commissioner's >

The 2022 Philippine Basketball Association (PBA) Philippine Cup finals was a best-of-7 championship series of the 2022 PBA Philippine Cup, and the conclusion of the conference's playoffs. The San Miguel Beermen and the TNT Tropang Giga competed for the 44th Philippine Cup championship and the 131st overall championship contested by the league.

A rematch of the 2019 Commissioner's Cup finals, where the 7-seeded Beermen upset the top-seeded TNT Tropang Giga (then known as TNT KaTropa), San Miguel defeated TNT in seven hard-fought games to win their 28th title in franchise history. Having previously defeated the Magnolia Hotshots last year, TNT entered the series as the defending Philippine Cup champions. June Mar Fajardo was named the finals MVP for this series.

== Background ==
=== Road to the finals ===
San Miguel Beermen		TNT Tropang Giga
Finished 9–2 (.818) in 1st place	Elimination round	Finished 8–3 (.727) in 2nd place with Magnolia and Barangay Ginebra
—	Tiebreaker	Head-to-head quotient: TNT 1.12, Magnolia 0.99, Barangay Ginebra 0.90 (2nd place)
Def. Blackwater in one game (twice-to-beat advantage)	Quarterfinals	Def. Converge in one game (twice-to-beat advantage)
Def. Meralco, 4–3	Semifinals	Def. Magnolia, 4–2

=== Head-to-head matchup ===
One Sports

July 7
7:15 pm

Box score

San Miguel Beermen 115, TNT Tropang Giga 99
Scoring by quarter: 26–22, 27–25, 30–24, 32–28
Pts: Fajardo 30; Rebs: Brondial 18; Asts: Perez 10	Pts: K. Williams 20; Rebs: K. Williams 10; Asts: Ganuelas-Rosser 4

Smart Araneta Coliseum, Quezon City
Referees: Peter Balao, Rommel Gruta, Dacx Dacanay, Janine Nicandro

== Series summary ==
Game	Date	Venue	Winner	Result
Game 1	August 21	Smart Araneta Coliseum	TNT	86–84
Game 2	August 24	Smart Araneta Coliseum	San Miguel	109–100
Game 3	August 26	SM Mall of Asia Arena	San Miguel	108–100
Game 4	August 28	Smart Araneta Coliseum	TNT	100–87
Game 5	August 31	Smart Araneta Coliseum	TNT	102–93
Game 6	September 2	Smart Araneta Coliseum	San Miguel	114–96
Game 7	September 4	Smart Araneta Coliseum	San Miguel	119–97

== Game summaries ==
=== Game 1 ===
One Sports

August 21
6:00 pm

Box score

San Miguel Beermen 84, TNT Tropang Giga 86
Scoring by quarter: 21–16, 28–21, 15–33, 20–16
Pts: Fajardo 24; Rebs: Fajardo 16; Asts: Enciso 4	Pts: Pogoy 26; Rebs: K. Williams 9 Asts: Rosario, K. Williams 3
TNT leads series, 1–0

Smart Araneta Coliseum, Quezon City
Attendance: 8,548
Referees: Nol Quilinguen, Sherwin Pineda, Jerry Narandan, Joel Baldago

Jayson Castro hits a jumper with no time left to win the game 86–84. The shot was counted by officials and TNT took a 1–0 series lead.

=== Game 2 ===
One Sports

August 24
5:45 pm

Box score

San Miguel Beermen 109, TNT Tropang Giga 100
Scoring by quarter: 30–28, 21–23, 31–28, 27–21
Pts: Perez 23; Rebs: Fajardo 8 Asts: Ross 10	Pts: Pogoy 28; Rebs: K. Williams 9 Asts: Erram 5
Series tied, 1–1

Smart Araneta Coliseum, Quezon City
Referees: Nol Quilinguen, Sherwin Pineda, Bing Oliva, Dacx Dacanay

=== Game 3 ===
One Sports

August 26
5:45 pm

Box score

San Miguel Beermen 108, TNT Tropang Giga 100 (OT)
Scoring by quarter: 27–19, 22–27, 25–30, 20–18, Overtime: 14–6
Pts: Fajardo 27; Rebs: Fajardo 27; Asts: Ross 5	Pts: Pogoy 25; Rebs: Erram 15; Asts: M. Williams 5
San Miguel leads series, 2–1

SM Mall of Asia Arena, Pasay
Referees: Sherwin Pineda, Rommel Gruta, Jerry Narandan, Joel Baldago

=== Game 4 ===
Prior to the game, San Miguel's June Mar Fajardo was awarded his ninth Best Player of the Conference award, extending his record for most BPC awards in a career.

One Sports

August 28
6:03 pm

Box score

San Miguel Beermen 87, TNT Tropang Giga 100
Scoring by quarter: 9–18, 27–25, 27–29, 24–28
Pts: Fajardo 20; Rebs: Fajardo 19; Asts: Enciso, Perez 4	Pts: Castro 26; Rebs: Erram 8 Asts: M. Williams 6
Series tied, 2–2

Smart Araneta Coliseum, Quezon City
Attendance: 10,569
Referees: Peter Balao, Rommel Gruta, Mike Flordeliza, Jeffrey Tantay

=== Game 5 ===
One Sports

August 31
5:45 pm

Box score

San Miguel Beermen 93, TNT Tropang Giga 102
Scoring by quarter: 28–24, 22–29, 25–31, 18–18
Pts: Fajardo 20; Rebs: Fajardo 16; Asts: Perez 7	Pts: M. Williams 23; Rebs: K. Williams 9 Asts: M. Williams 5
TNT leads series, 3–2

Smart Araneta Coliseum, Quezon City
Referees: Nol Quilinguen, Sherwin Pineda, Jerry Narandan, Albert Nubla

=== Game 6 ===
One Sports

September 2
5:45 pm

Box score

San Miguel Beermen 114, TNT Tropang Giga 96
Scoring by quarter: 40–24, 23–26, 29–18, 22–28
Pts: Lassiter 22; Rebs: Fajardo 12; Asts: Fajardo 5	Pts: Pogoy 31; Rebs: Erram 8 Asts: Montalbo 5
Series tied, 3–3

Smart Araneta Coliseum, Quezon City
Referees: Sherwin Pineda, Mike Flordeliza, Jerry Narandan, Joel Baldago

=== Game 7 ===
One Sports

September 4
6:00 pm

Box score

San Miguel Beermen 119, TNT Tropang Giga 97
Scoring by quarter: 29–31, 37–24, 18–34, 35–8
Pts: Perez 25; Rebs: Fajardo 18; Asts: Perez 7	Pts: Castro 32; Rebs: Castro 10; Asts: Castro 8
San Miguel wins series, 4–3

Smart Araneta Coliseum, Quezon City
Attendance: 15,195
Referees: Nol Quilinguen, Mike Flordeliza, Janine Nicandro, Albert Nubla

The TNT entered the game without Chot Reyes, who was out due to health and safety protocols. Starting center Poy Erram was ejected with 55 seconds left in the second quarter after hitting Mo Tautuaa's head during a foul.

After trailing 84–89 by the end of the 3rd quarter, San Miguel used a 17–0 run at the start of the 4th quarter to clinch their 28th title overall, and 9th title under coach Leo Austria. This fourth quarter rally is led by CJ Perez's 25 points in the game. San Miguel won their 6th Philippine Cup title in the past 8 years. They previously have won five straight Philippine Cup titles from 2015 to 2019.

== Rosters ==
San Miguel Beermen roster
Players
Coaches

Pos.	#	POB	Name	Height	Weight	DOB (YYYY–MM–DD)	From
G	0	(United States)	Simon Enciso	5 ft 11 in (1.80 m)	185 lb (84 kg)	1991–02–12	Notre Dame de Namur
F	2	(Philippines)	Michael Cañete	6 ft 4 in (1.93 m)		1993–08–14	Arellano
G/F	3	(Philippines)	Von Pessumal	6 ft 2 in (1.88 m)	185 lb (84 kg)	1993–02–12	Ateneo
G	6	(United States)	Chris Ross (C)	6 ft 1 in (1.85 m)	180 lb (82 kg)	1985–03–09	Marshall
G/F	11	(United States)	Robbie Herndon	6 ft 3 in (1.91 m)	180 lb (82 kg)	1993–07–16	San Francisco
G	12	(Philippines)	Paul Zamar	5 ft 10 in (1.78 m)	179 lb (81 kg)	1987–10–20	UE
G/F	13	(United States)	Marcio Lassiter	6 ft 2 in (1.88 m)	185 lb (84 kg)	1987–05–16	Cal State Fullerton
C	15	(Philippines)	June Mar Fajardo	6 ft 10 in (2.08 m)	268 lb (122 kg)	1989–11–17	Cebu
F/C	33	(United States)	Moala Tautuaa	6 ft 8 in (2.03 m)	245 lb (111 kg)	1989–04–30	Chadron State
G	39	(Philippines)	Jericho Cruz	6 ft 1 in (1.85 m)	190 lb (86 kg)	1990–10–11	Adamson
F/C	55	(Philippines)	Jeepy Faundo	6 ft 6 in (1.98 m)		1995–09–21	UST
G/F	77	(Hong Kong)	CJ Perez	6 ft 2 in (1.88 m)	185 lb (84 kg)	1993–11–17	Lyceum
F	87	(Philippines)	Vic Manuel	6 ft 4 in (1.93 m)	201 lb (91 kg)	1987–06–18	PSBA
F/C	91	(Philippines)	Rodney Brondial	6 ft 5 in (1.96 m)	210 lb (95 kg)	1990–11–20	Adamson

Head coach

- (Philippines) Leo Austria

Assistant coach(es)

- (Philippines) Peter Martin (1st assistant)
- (Philippines) Ato Agustin
- (Philippines) Dayong Mendoza
- (Philippines) Jorge Gallent
- (Philippines) Boyzie Zamar
- (Philippines) Biboy Ravanes

Team manager

- (Philippines) Gee Abanilla
- (Philippines) Daniel Henares (assistant)

Legend

- (C) Team captain
- (CI) Commissioner's Cup Import
- (GI) Governors' Cup Import
- (EI) EASL Import
- (DP) Unsigned draft pick
- (FA) Free agent
- (IN) Inactive
- (S) Suspended
- (R) Rookie
- Injured

Roster

TNT Tropang Giga roster
Players
Coaches

Pos.	#	POB	Name	Height	Weight	DOB (YYYY–MM–DD)	From
F	2	(Philippines)	Carl Bryan Cruz	6 ft 4 in (1.93 m)	200 lb (91 kg)	1991–08–21	Far Eastern
G	5	(United States)	Mikey Williams	6 ft 2 in (1.88 m)	190 lb (86 kg)	1991–10–27	Cal State Fullerton
C	7	(Philippines)	Poy Erram	6 ft 8 in (2.03 m)	227 lb (103 kg)	1989–07–07	Ateneo
G	10	(Philippines)	Ryan Reyes	6 ft 2 in (1.88 m)	190 lb (86 kg)	1983–08–10	Cal State Fullerton
G	11	(Philippines)	Jaydee Tungcab (R)	6 ft 3 in (1.91 m)	196 lb (89 kg)	1997–05–05	Philippines
F	12	(Philippines)	Glenn Khobuntin	6 ft 4 in (1.93 m)	195 lb (88 kg)	1991–09–07	National-U
G	13	(Philippines)	Brian Heruela	5 ft 10 in (1.78 m)	195 lb (88 kg)	1989–04–13	Cebu
G	15	(Philippines)	Kib Montalbo	6 ft 0 in (1.83 m)	155 lb (70 kg)	1996–04–02	De La Salle
G/F	16	(Philippines)	Roger Pogoy	6 ft 2 in (1.88 m)	180 lb (82 kg)	1992–06–16	Far Eastern
G	17	(Philippines)	Jayson Castro	5 ft 10 in (1.78 m)	185 lb (84 kg)	1986–06–30	Philippine Christian
F	18	(Philippines)	Troy Rosario	6 ft 7 in (2.01 m)	198 lb (90 kg)	1992–01–20	National-U
G	20	(Philippines)	Jjay Alejandro	6 ft 0 in (1.83 m)	165 lb (75 kg)	1995–04–13	National-U
F/C	21	(United States)	Kelly Williams (C)	6 ft 6 in (1.98 m)	215 lb (98 kg)	1982–02–07	Oakland
F/C	22	(Philippines)	Dave Marcelo	6 ft 5 in (1.96 m)	223 lb (101 kg)	1989–02–22	San Beda
G/F	24	(Philippines)	Matt Ganuelas-Rosser	6 ft 4 in (1.93 m)	186 lb (84 kg)	1990–06–13	Cal Poly Pomona
F	77	(Philippines)	Gab Banal	6 ft 3 in (1.91 m)	200 lb (91 kg)	1990–09–09	Mapúa

Head coach

- (Philippines) Chot Reyes

Assistant coach(es)

- (Philippines) Joshua Reyes (1st assistant)
- (Philippines) Bong Ravena
- (Philippines) Sandy Arespacochaga
- (Philippines) Ranidel de Ocampo
- (United States) Alton Lister
- (Philippines) Yuri Escueta
- (Philippines) Mau Belen

Team manager

- (Philippines) Jojo Lastimosa
- (Philippines) Miguel Fernandez (assistant)

Legend

- (C) Team captain
- (CI) Commissioner's Cup Import
- (GI) Governors' Cup Import
- (EI) EASL Import
- (DP) Unsigned draft pick
- (FA) Free agent
- (IN) Inactive
- (S) Suspended
- (R) Rookie
- Injured

Roster

== Broadcast notes ==
The Philippine Cup finals was aired on TV5 & One Sports with simulcast on PBA Rush SMART Sports Facebook Livestream & Smart GigaPlay App (both in standard and high definition).

The PBA Rush broadcast provided English language coverage of the finals.

The SMART Sports broadcast provided English-Filipino language coverage of the finals.

Game	TV5 & One Sports			SMART Sports, Facebook Livestream		
Game	Play-by-play	Analyst(s)	Courtside reporters	Play-by-play	Analyst(s)	Courtside reporters
Game 1	Charlie Cuna	Joaquin Henson and Norman Black	Denise Tan	Jinno Rufino	Eric Altamirano	Denise Tan
Game 2	Sev Sarmenta	Andy Jao and Topex Robinson	Apple David	Jutt Sulit	Borgie Hermida	Apple David
Game 3	Magoo Marjon	Joaquin Henson and Ronnie Magsanoc	Denise Tan	Andre Co	Mark Molina	Denise Tan
Game 4	Jutt Sulit	Dominic Uy and Kevin Alas	Apple David	Mikee Reyes	Dylan Ababou	Apple David
Game 5	Sev Sarmenta	Andy Jao and Topex Robinson	Bea Escudero	Chiqui Reyes	Jolly Escobar	Bea Escudero
Game 6	Charlie Cuna	Dominic Uy and Norman Black	Apple David	Carlo Pamintuan	Allan Gregorio	Apple David
Game 7	Magoo Marjon	Joaquin Henson and Tim Cone	Denise Tan	Mikee Reyes	Mark Molina	Denise Tan

- Additional Game 7 crew:
  - Trophy presentation: Jutt Sulit & Bea Escudero
  - Celebration interviewer: Denise Tan
