= 2021 PBA Philippine Cup finals =

2021 edition of the PBA Philippine Cup finals

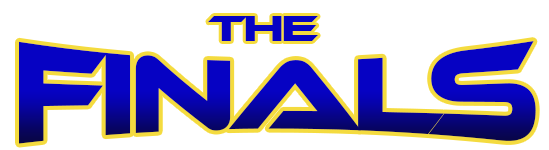
Team	Coach	Wins
(1) TNT Tropang Giga	Chot Reyes	4
(3) Magnolia Pambansang Manok Hotshots	Chito Victolero	1
- Dates: October 20–29, 2021
- MVP: Mikey Williams (TNT Tropang Giga)
- Television: Local: One Sports; TV5; PBA Rush (HD); International: AksyonTV International
- Announcers: see Broadcast notes
- Radio network: Radyo5 (DWFM)

Referees
- Game 1: J. Mariano, M. Flordeliza, A. Nubla, J. Tantay
- Game 2: N. Quilingen, R. Gruta, J. Baldago, B. Peclaro
- Game 3: P. Balao, S. Pineda, J. Nicandro, K. Hallig
- Game 4: N. Quiliguen, R. Gruta, A. Nubla, J. Baldago
- Game 5: J. Mariano, S. Pineda, R. Gruta, M. Flordeliza

PBA Philippine Cup finals chronology
- < 2020 2022 >

PBA finals chronology
- < 2020 Philippine 2021 Governors' >

The 2021 Philippine Basketball Association (PBA) Philippine Cup finals was a best-of-7 championship series of the 2021 PBA Philippine Cup, and the conclusion of the conference's playoffs. The TNT Tropang Giga and the Magnolia Pambansang Manok Hotshots competed for the 43rd Philippine Cup championship and the 129th overall championship contested by the league.

This was the first time that the two teams meet in the finals since the 2014 Commissioner's Cup, where Magnolia (named as San Mig Super Coffee Mixers during that time) won the championship against TNT (named as Talk 'N Text Tropang Texters during that time), three games to one.

TNT defeated Magnolia, four games to one, to win the franchise's sixth Philippine Cup (8 years after their last Philippine Cup championship in 2013) and their 8th title overall. This was the first PBA title by a franchise not owned by the San Miguel Corporation since the 2016 PBA Commissioner's Cup. Mikey Williams was named the finals' MVP.

== Background ==
=== Road to the finals ===
TNT Tropang Giga		Magnolia Pambansang Manok Hotshots
Finished 10–1 (.909) in 1st place	Elimination round	Finished 8–3 (.727) in 3rd place
Def. Barangay Ginebra in one game (twice-to-beat advantage)	Quarterfinals	Def. Rain or Shine, 2–0 (best-of-three)
Def. San Miguel, 4–3	Semifinals	Def. Meralco, 4–2

=== Head-to-head matchup ===
One Sports

September 5
4:35 pm

Box score

TNT Tropang Giga 83, Magnolia Pambansang Manok Hotshots 76
Scoring by quarter: 15–15, 20–17, 24–20, 24–24
Pts: Castro 17; Rebs: K. Williams 15; Asts: M. Williams 5	Pts: Abueva 23; Rebs: Sangalang 10; Asts: Jalalon 4

DHSVU Gym, Bacolor, Pampanga
Referees: Nol Quilinguen, Janine Nicandro, Joel Baldago

== Series summary ==
Game	Date	Venue	Winner	Result
Game 1	October 20	DHSVU Gym	TNT	88–70
Game 2	October 22	DHSVU Gym	TNT	105–93
Game 3	October 24	DHSVU Gym	Magnolia	106–98
Game 4	October 27	DHSVU Gym	TNT	106–89
Game 5	October 29	DHSVU Gym	TNT	94–79

== Game summaries ==
=== Game 1 ===
One Sports

October 20
6:00 pm

Box score

TNT Tropang Giga 88, Magnolia Pambansang Manok Hotshots 70
Scoring by quarter: 24–14, 29–20, 21–14, 14–22
Pts: M. Williams 21; Rebs: M. Williams 10; Asts: M. Williams 5	Pts: Corpuz, Lee 12; Rebs: Abueva, Corpuz 11; Asts: Jalalon 3
TNT leads series, 1–0

DHSVU Gym, Bacolor, Pampanga
Referees: Jimmy Mariano, Mike Flordeliza, Albert Nubla, Jeffrey Tantay

=== Game 2 ===
One Sports

October 22
6:00 pm

Box score

TNT Tropang Giga 105, Magnolia Pambansang Manok Hotshots 93
Scoring by quarter: 40–27, 26–23, 20–29, 19–14
Pts: M. Williams 28; Rebs: Erram 12; Asts: M. Williams 6	Pts: Sangalang 25; Rebs: Abueva 11; Asts: Jalalon 8
TNT leads series, 2–0

DHSVU Gym, Bacolor, Pampanga
Referees: Nol Quilingen, Rommel Gruta, Joel Baldago, Brian Peclaro

=== Game 3 ===
One Sports

October 24
4:35 pm

Box score

TNT Tropang Giga 98, Magnolia Pambansang Manok Hotshots 106
Scoring by quarter: 20–26, 26–26, 31–30, 21–24
Pts: M. Williams 39; Rebs: Erram 11; Asts: Heruela 5	Pts: Lee 21; Rebs: Reavis 9 Asts: Sangalang 5
TNT leads series, 2–1

DHSVU Gym, Bacolor, Pampanga
Referees: Peter Balao, Sherwin Pineda, Janine Nicandro, Kenny Hallig

=== Game 4 ===
One Sports

October 27
6:00 pm

Box score

TNT Tropang Giga 106, Magnolia Pambansang Manok Hotshots 89
Scoring by quarter: 24–24, 33–15, 25–28, 24–22
Pts: M. Williams 26; Rebs: K. Williams 7 Asts: M. Williams 7	Pts: Abueva 28; Rebs: Sangalang 10; Asts: Jalalon 8
TNT leads series, 3–1

DHSVU Gym, Bacolor, Pampanga
Referees: Nol Quiliguen, Rommel Gruta, Albert Nubla, Joel Baldago

Prior to the game, Magnolia's Calvin Abueva was awarded his second Best Player of the Conference award, beating TNT's Mikey Williams and Abueva's teammate, Ian Sangalang, to the award.

=== Game 5 ===
One Sports

October 29
6:00 pm

Box score

TNT Tropang Giga 94, Magnolia Pambansang Manok Hotshots 79
Scoring by quarter: 21–14, 26–19, 25–20, 22–26
Pts: M. Williams 24; Rebs: Erram 10; Asts: M. Williams 4	Pts: Sangalang 18; Rebs: Reavis 10; Asts: Barroca 6
TNT wins series, 4–1

DHSVU Gym, Bacolor, Pampanga
Referees: Jimmy Mariano, Sherwin Pineda, Rommel Gruta, Mike Flordeliza

== Rosters ==
TNT Tropang Giga roster
Players
Coaches

Pos.	#	POB	Name	Height	Weight	DOB (YYYY–MM–DD)	From
G	5	(United States)	Mikey Williams (R)	6 ft 2 in (1.88 m)	190 lb (86 kg)	1991–10–27	Cal State Fullerton
C	7	(Philippines)	John Paul Erram	6 ft 8 in (2.03 m)	227 lb (103 kg)	1989–07–07	Ateneo
G	8	(Philippines)	Chris Exciminiano	6 ft 0 in (1.83 m)	185 lb (84 kg)	1988–11–17	Far Eastern
G	10	(Philippines)	Ryan Reyes (C)	6 ft 2 in (1.88 m)	190 lb (86 kg)	1983–08–10	Cal State Fullerton
F	12	(Philippines)	Glenn Khobuntin	6 ft 4 in (1.93 m)	195 lb (88 kg)	1991–09–07	National-U
G	13	(Philippines)	Brian Heruela	5 ft 10 in (1.78 m)	195 lb (88 kg)	1989–04–13	Cebu
G	15	(Philippines)	Kib Montalbo	6 ft 0 in (1.83 m)	155 lb (70 kg)	1995–04–02	De La Salle
G/F	16	(Philippines)	Roger Pogoy	6 ft 2 in (1.88 m)	180 lb (82 kg)	1992–06–16	Far Eastern
G	17	(Philippines)	Jayson Castro	5 ft 10 in (1.78 m)	185 lb (84 kg)	1986–06–30	Philippine Christian
F	18	(Philippines)	Troy Rosario	6 ft 7 in (2.01 m)	198 lb (90 kg)	1992–01–20	National-U
G	20	(Philippines)	Jjay Alejandro	6 ft 0 in (1.83 m)	165 lb (75 kg)	1995–04–13	National-U
F/C	21	(United States)	Kelly Williams	6 ft 6 in (1.98 m)	215 lb (98 kg)	1982–02–07	Oakland
F/C	22	(Philippines)	Dave Marcelo	6 ft 5 in (1.96 m)	223 lb (101 kg)	1989–02–22	San Beda
F/C	23	(Philippines)	Jay Washington (IN)	6 ft 7 in (2.01 m)	210 lb (95 kg)	1981–10–10	Eckerd
F/C	28	(Philippines)	Chris Javier	6 ft 4 in (1.93 m)	200 lb (91 kg)	1992–12–06	UE
G	29	(Philippines)	Gryann Mendoza	6 ft 1 in (1.85 m)	180 lb (82 kg)	1990–09–09	Far Eastern

Head coach

- (Philippines) Chot Reyes

Assistant coach(es)

- (Philippines) Bong Ravena (1st assistant)
- (Philippines) Joshua Reyes
- (Philippines) Ranidel de Ocampo
- (Philippines) Yuri Escueta
- (Philippines) Mau Belen
- (United States) Alton Lister

Team manager

- (Philippines) Gabby Cui
- (Philippines) Miguel Fernandez (assistant)

Legend

- (C) Team captain
- (CI) Commissioner's Cup Import
- (GI) Governors' Cup Import
- (EI) EASL Import
- (DP) Unsigned draft pick
- (FA) Free agent
- (IN) Inactive
- (S) Suspended
- (R) Rookie
- Injured

Roster

Magnolia Pambansang Manok Hotshots roster
Players
Coaches

Pos.	#	POB	Name	Height	Weight	DOB (YYYY–MM–DD)	From
G	0	(United States)	Loren Brill (R)	6 ft 0 in (1.83 m)		1997–01–14	Old Dominion
F	1	(Philippines)	Jackson Corpuz	6 ft 4 in (1.93 m)	195 lb (88 kg)	1989–02–08	Philippine Christian
G	2	(Philippines)	Justin Melton	5 ft 9 in (1.75 m)	163 lb (74 kg)	1987–04–07	Mount Olive
G	3	(Philippines)	Paul Lee	6 ft 0 in (1.83 m)	200 lb (91 kg)	1989–02–14	UE
C	4	(United States)	Rafi Reavis (C)	6 ft 8 in (2.03 m)	210 lb (95 kg)	1977–07–26	Coppin State
G	5	(United States)	Jerrick Ahanmisi (R)	6 ft 1 in (1.85 m)	185 lb (84 kg)	1997–10–16	Adamson
G	6	(Philippines)	Jio Jalalon	5 ft 9 in (1.75 m)	150 lb (68 kg)	1992–08–02	Arellano
C	10	(Philippines)	Ian Sangalang	6 ft 7 in (2.01 m)	212 lb (96 kg)	1991–12–20	San Sebastian
F	11	(Philippines)	Ronnie de Leon (R)	6 ft 6 in (1.98 m)	210 lb (95 kg)	1994–02–24	UE
F	13	(Philippines)	Calvin Abueva	6 ft 3 in (1.91 m)	209 lb (95 kg)	1988–02–04	San Sebastian
G	14	(Philippines)	Mark Barroca	5 ft 10 in (1.78 m)	170 lb (77 kg)	1986–04–25	Far Eastern
G/F	17	(Philippines)	Alvin Capobres	6 ft 2 in (1.88 m)		1994–08–19	San Sebastian
G/F	19	(United States)	Rome dela Rosa	6 ft 3 in (1.91 m)	185 lb (84 kg)	1990–12–11	San Beda
F/C	32	(United States)	Kyle Pascual	6 ft 6 in (1.98 m)	210 lb (95 kg)	1990–04–13	San Beda
F	57	(Philippines)	Aris Dionisio	6 ft 5 in (1.96 m)		1995–07–21	St. Clare

Head coach

- (Philippines) Chito Victolero

Assistant coach(es)

- (Philippines) Jason Webb (1st Assistant)
- (Philippines) Johnny Abarrientos
- (Philippines) Mon Jose
- (Philippines) Juno Sauler
- (Philippines) Angelito Esguerra

Team manager

- (Philippines) Alvin Patrimonio

Legend

- (C) Team captain
- (CI) Commissioner's Cup Import
- (GI) Governors' Cup Import
- (EI) EASL Import
- (DP) Unsigned draft pick
- (FA) Free agent
- (IN) Inactive
- (S) Suspended
- (R) Rookie
- Injured

Roster

== Broadcast notes ==
The Philippine Cup finals were aired on TV5 with simulcasts on One Sports and PBA Rush (both in standard and high definition). TV5's radio arm, Radyo5 provided the radio play-by-play coverage.

One Sports provided online livestreaming via the PusoPilipinas and Smart Sports Facebook pages using the TV5 and PBA Rush feeds respectively.

The PBA Rush broadcast provided English-language coverage of the finals.

Due to COVID-19 restrictions, the TV and radio panel commentaries except for the courtside reporter were conducted offsite from the TV5 Media Center in Mandaluyong.

Game	TV5		PBA Rush (English)		Courtside reporters
Game	Play-by-play	Analyst(s)	Play-by-play	Analyst(s)	Courtside reporters
Game 1	Charlie Cuna	Richard del Rosario	Paolo del Rosario	Ryan Gregorio	Carlo Pamintuan
Game 2	Magoo Marjon	Ryan Gregorio	Anthony Suntay	Ali Peek	Carlo Pamintuan
Game 3	Charlie Cuna	Dominic Uy	Paolo del Rosario	Richard del Rosario	Carlo Pamintuan
Game 4	Magoo Marjon	Eric Reyes	Jutt Sulit	Tony dela Cruz	Carlo Pamintuan
Game 5	Charlie Cuna	Richard del Rosario	Paolo del Rosario	Ryan Gregorio	Carlo Pamintuan

- Additional Game 5 crew:
  - Trophy presentation: Carlo Pamintuan
  - Celebration interviewers: Carlo Pamintuan
