= Roger Pogoy =

Filipino basketball player (born 1992)

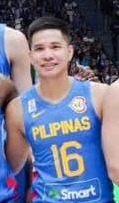
- Pogoy in 2023

No. 16 – TNT Tropang 5G
- Position: Shooting guard / small forward
- League: PBA

Personal information
- Born: June 16, 1992 (age 34) Minglanilla, Cebu, Philippines
- Listed height: 6 ft 2 in (1.88 m)
- Listed weight: 180 lb (82 kg)

Career information
- High school: UC (Cebu City)
- College: FEU
- PBA draft: 2016: Special draft
- Drafted by: TNT KaTropa
- Playing career: 2016–present

Career history
- 2016–present: TNT KaTropa / TNT Tropang Giga / TNT Tropang 5G

Career highlights
- 4× PBA champion (2021 Philippine, 2023 Governors', 2024 Governors', 2024–25 Commissioner's); 6× PBA All-Star (2017–2019, 2023, 2024, 2026); 2x PBA Mythical Second Team (2019, 2025); PBA Rookie of the Year (2017); PBA All-Rookie Team (2017); UAAP champion (2015)

Roger Ray Bacusma Pogoy (born June 16, 1992) is a Filipino professional basketball player for the TNT Tropang 5G of the Philippine Basketball Association (PBA). He won a championship in high school then played for Far Eastern University, where he won a championship in his final year there.

Pogoy was then drafted by TNT in the 2016 PBA draft from the national team training pool. He was named Rookie of the Year in 2017. He became a five-time PBA All-Star, a Mythical Team member in 2019, and a four-time PBA champion.

He has also represented the Philippines national team in international competitions. He first played for the national team in the SEABA Stankovic Cup in 2016. Since then, he has played in two FIBA World Cups (2019 and 2023) and other tournaments at the Asian and Southeast Asian levels. At the 2021 Southeast Asian Games, he won a silver medal.

== Early life and college career ==
Pogoy grew up in Talisay, Cebu, as the youngest of two brothers and two sisters and was taught basketball by his father, who was a former basketball player in Mindanao turned seaman. Although he didn't play basketball in grade school, he played it at summer camps and at local courts.

Pogoy started getting recognition for his basketball skills at the Salazar Institute of Technology but dropped out of the school. In his first year of high school, he got a scholarship from the University of Visayas, where he trained as a Team B player by waking up at 4 am for 5 am practices and was mentored by Rudy Enterina, a former PBA player. During this time, he frequently played computer games such as Counter-Strike, which affected his grades and caused him to skip practices. After a talk with his father made him acknowledge that his grades were suffering and that he needed to improve his discipline, he transferred to the University of Cebu (UC).

At UC, Pogoy first played for their Under-16 team in the inaugural season of the CYBL in 2008. He eventually became a star for the UC Junior Webmasters that year, leading them to a CESAFI juniors title and claiming the Finals MVP award. He then joined the Tamaraws after his father read about the FEU tryouts in Cebu in the local newspaper and encouraged him to try out.

== College career ==
Pogoy first played for the FEU Tamaraws in UAAP Season 74 in 2011. The Tamaraws made it to the finals that year but lost to the Ateneo Blue Eagles in two games. In Season 75 (2012), Pogoy had a game where he scored 17 points and 13 rebounds. The team finished fifth, with a win–loss record of 9–5. Pogoy returned for Season 76 (2013). They lost in the Final Four to the De La Salle Green Archers. In the season 77 finals in 2014, Pogoy scored 10 of his 14 points in the third quarter to help the Tamaraws win Game 1. They eventually lost in three games to the NU Bulldogs.

In his first four years at FEU, Pogoy often spent more time on the bench as players like Terrence Romeo, RR Garcia and JR Cawaling received more playing time. He got frustrated and told his parents and high school coach that he wanted to go home. His parents convinced him to stay, so he kept working. Coach Nash Racela then made him dormmates with teammate Mac Belo, who influenced him to be even more disciplined.

In Season 78 (2015), Pogoy had an expanded role; heading into the season, Rick Olivares of The Philippine Star characterized him as the team's "X-factor". He led all scorers in the semifinal game that brought them back to the finals, scoring 16 points with 10 coming in the second half. Their opponent in the finals were the UST Growling Tigers. In Game 1, Pogoy had 15 points (12 in the first quarter) to lead a balanced attack to get the win. In Game 2, Pogoy had 12 points but missed the latter part of the fourth quarter due to cramps. The Tamaraws lost that game, 62–56. In Game 3, Pogoy scored 14 points to put UST away, winning FEU its first title since 2005. He graduated after that season.

== Amateur career ==
Pogoy played for Café France in the D-League Aspirants' Cup in 2012. In 2014, he and several of his Tamaraw teammates played for the MJM Builders. In 2015, he played for the Phoenix Petroleum.

== Professional career ==
=== TNT KaTropa / TNT Tropang Giga / TNT Tropang 5G (2016–present) ===
==== 2016–17 season: Rookie of the Year ====
Pogoy was drafted in 2016 from the national team training pool by the TNT KaTropa and signed for ₱9,000,000. He debuted with nine points and three rebounds. In the next game, against Barangay Ginebra San Miguel, he scored 15 points, played good defense on L.A. Tenorio, and grabbed a crucial offensive rebound. He had 16 points to go along with four assists and four steals in a 104–92 win against the Mahindra Floodbusters. In a win that qualified the Katropa for the All-Filipino playoffs, he scored 20 points and had four rebounds. In the quarterfinals, the team ousted the Globalport Batang Pier, setting them up for a semifinals series against the San Miguel Beermen. In Game 3, he had a then career-high 22 points with seven rebounds and six triples (with three made in the final quarter) to lead the series 2–1. The KaTropa eventually lost the series in 7 games.

Halfway through the Commissioner's Cup, Pogoy made the All-Star Games as a member of Gilas Pilipinas. The KaTropa finished with a record of 8–3, good for 4th place. They beat the Meralco Bolts in the first round, and Ginebra in the second round. Prior to the finals, he averaged 12 points, three rebounds, and two threes made. For the finals, they matched up against the Beermen. In Game 1, he set a season-high of 27 points with five threes, five rebounds, and three steals. That and Joshua Smith's lay-up with 1.6 seconds left won the game for the KaTropa. In Game 2, he was fined ₱30,000 for deliberately hitting Arwind Santos in the groin. TNT eventually lost 88–102. They lost Game 3 but won Game 4. San Miguel then closed out the series to win the Commissioner's Cup.

After his stint with the national team, Pogoy and Gilas teammates Jayson Castro and Troy Rosario returned to the KaTropa for the Governor's Cup. The team clinched a twice-to-beat advantage and beat Rain or Shine in the quarterfinals. They also faced Ginebra in the semis. TNT lost in four games. He finished the season winning Rookie of the Year and was on the All-Rookie Team.

==== 2017–18 and 2018–19 seasons: Mythical Team selections ====
In his first game of his second season, Pogoy scored 16 points on 7-of-18 shooting. He had a game-high 24 points along with eight rebounds, three assists, and two steals against his former FEU teammates Mac Belo and Raymar Jose. The KaTropa made it to the playoffs but failed to advance to the semis. He was second in voting among Visayas players for the All-Star Games. In the Commissioner's Cup, they lost to the Beermen again. Pogoy was injured with a sprained ankle in the Governor's Cup, but he was able to play in their next games as the KaTropa did not make the playoffs.

In the opening game for the 2019 Philippine Cup, Pogoy grabbed a career-high 16 rebounds in a loss to Ginebra. He had 30 points (17 coming in the fourth quarter and a three to send the game into overtime) and 12 boards in a 84–93 loss to the Phoenix Fuel Masters. In a game against the Magnolia Hotshots, he scored 26 points, scoring five of the team's eight points in overtime, including a turnaround jumper from the post over Jio Jalalon that sealed the win. After being unable to play versus Rain or Shine due to the flu, he returned and led the KaTropa to a rout of the Blackwater Elite. In that game, he finished with 28 points on 13-of-17 shooting, with 12 of those points coming in the fourth quarter, where he scored 10 straight in less than two minutes while also collecting six rebounds and four assists. The KaTropa won two more games before losing to the Batang Pier, giving them a record of 7–4. Before the playoffs, he was part of the All-Star Three-Point Shootout, the Rookie-Sophomores vs. Juniors Game, and the North vs. South Game in the 2019 All-Star Weekend. In the playoffs, the KaTropa lost in the quarterfinals to the Beermen in 3 games. Despite the early exit, he was a finalist for Best Player of the Conference.

In the 2019 Commissioner's Cup, Pogoy had 31 points on 10 of 21 shooting in a physical 114–88 match against Phoenix. In a win against Ginebra, he made a season-high 38 points on 10 made threes, becoming only the fourth local player in PBA history to make that many threes in a game. With Terrence Jones as their import, they clinched the first seed. They beat Alaska in the quarterfinals and Ginebra in the semifinals. They matched up with the Beermen once again, winning game 1 of the finals. San Miguel then evened the series in Game 2. In Game 3, Pogoy scored 29 points with five threes and eight rebounds to take a 2–1 lead. The Beermen eventually won the series in six games, 4–2.

In the 2019 Governor's Cup, they started off 7–0 before losing to the NLEX Road Warriors. They clinched the 3rd seed, but Pogoy suffered a back injury, later revealed to be a nerve root irritation caused by a bulging disc. He played through it in the semifinals after missing a SEA Games stint. TNT lost in 5 games to Meralco. He ended the season as a member of the Mythical Second Team.

==== 2020 and 2021 seasons: Bubble season and first championship ====
After the onset of the COVID-19 pandemic in the Philippines, the PBA did not resume play until October 11, 2020, in a specially created "bubble" isolation zone in Angeles City. In their first game of the bubble, Pogoy erupted for a career-high 45 points (21 in the first half) with 10 threes (which tied his career-high and the franchise record for most threes made by a local) to get their first win 100–95. In the next game, his teammate Bobby Ray Parks Jr. scored 40 points against the Terrafirma Dyip, making him and Pogoy the first teammates in 30 years to score 40 points one after the other. He injured his left ankle in the third game, but showed no signs of injury in the next game as he scored 30 points, five rebounds, two assists, and a block. He earned the first PBA Bubble Player of the Week. TNT was able to win five straight games before losing their first game against NLEX. They eventually made the playoffs as a third seed. He scored 34 points in a quarterfinals win against the Alaska Aces. In the semis, they were able to eliminate Phoenix in five games, making it to the finals. In the finals, Pogoy scored 19 points and 38 in the first two losses to Ginebra. In Game 3, he top-scored for his team with 18 points to get their first win in the Finals. In Game 4, he scored 34 points in a losing effort as Ginebra took a 3–1 lead. In the last game, he scored 23 points as Ginebra won the championship. Pogoy was nominated for Best Player of the Conference but lost to Stanley Pringle.

In the 2021 Philippine Cup, Pogoy scored 13 points in their first game. They won six straight games but had their first loss against San Miguel. They then won their next four games, closing out as the 1st seed. Pogoy scored 16 points to lead TNT to eliminate Ginebra in the first round. In Game 1 of the semis against the Beermen, he scored 23 points and prevented Marcio Lassiter from taking a shot to win 89–88. Lassiter beat the buzzer in Game 2 to even the series, but TNT eventually won in seven games, setting themselves up for a showdown against Magnolia. This was actually Pogoy's first playoff series win against the Beermen ever since he came into the league. In Game 5 of the finals he scored 19 points, three rebounds, three steals and two assists as he finally won his first PBA championship.

In a Governors' Cup loss to Meralco, Pogoy scored 25 points but didn't finish the game due to severe cramps. He then scored 18 points as TNT scored its first win of the conference. Several months later, he had to sit out a game due to a calf injury he suffered in a scrimmage. In the quarterfinals, they lost to Ginebra.

==== 2022–2024: Second championship and myocarditis diagnosis ====
In their second game of the 2022–23 season against Blackwater, he scored 32 points (with 17 coming in the fourth quarter to bring them back from a 13-point deficit). However, his performance was offset by Jvee Casio, who scored 12 of his 22 points in the fourth quarter, and TNT lost that game. On his 30th birthday, he scored 30 points against NLEX but lost that game, their second loss in four contests. He scored 20 points for the third time in the Philippine Cup in a win over Phoenix. In a win over the Batang Pier, he contributed 22 points, five rebounds, four assists, and two steals. TNT finished the elimination round with an 8–3 record, with their last win coming against Ginebra in which he led with 30 points, eight rebounds, and three steals. In Game 1 of the semis against Magnolia, he scored 23 points with five assists as they got the opening win. They got past Magnolia in five games and returned to the finals. There, they lost to San Miguel in seven games. At the end of the conference, he led all scorers with 18.9 points.

Pogoy started the Commissioner's Cup with a 23-point performance in a loss to the Hotshots. He then led TNT to its first win of the conference by making his first 10 shots of their game against the Batang Pier and finished with 32 points in 28 minutes. Against the Fuel Masters, he scored 22 points with eight rebounds but missed what could have been the game-winning basket. TNT did not make the playoffs that conference, missing the playoffs after 24 straight appearances.

In the Governors' Cup, he scored 21 points on 9-of-11 shooting with six rebounds in a win over Phoenix. He then scored 22 points (with 14 points in the third quarter) in a come from behind win over Rain or Shine. In a win over Magnolia, he scored 20 points for the fourth straight game. Against Blackwater, he scored a season-high 40 points on seven three-pointers alongside nine rebounds as he and import Rondae Hollis-Jefferson combined for 77 points and 22 rebounds to lead TNT to the blowout win. That season, he was voted in as an All-Star for the 2023 All-Star Game. He also participated in the Three-Point Shootout. TNT entered the playoffs with a 10–1 record and the first seed. In the quarterfinals, he led with 25 points on 11-of-18 shooting, alongside 11 rebounds, seven assists, four steals, and a block against Phoenix as they returned to the semis. There, they defeated Meralco 3–1, getting into the finals against Ginebra. In game 1 of the finals, he struggled as he only had six points and shot 20% from the field in the loss. After promising to bounce back, he scored 17 points with three triples while also grabbing seven rebounds and three assists as they won Game 2. In Game 3, he fractured his pinky and was out for the rest of the finals. Despite his absence, TNT was able to win the championship.

On June 26, 2023, Pogoy signed a three-year contract extension with the team. However, it was announced before the start of the 2023–24 Commissioner's Cup that he would not be playing for at least six months after being diagnosed with myocarditis, a rare heart disease. Eventually, he was able to return within three months, scoring 11 points in a 116–96 win against the Phoenix Super LPG Fuel Masters on January 14, 2024. He got his fifth All-Star appearance that season as a replacement for the injured Tyler Tio. During the Philippine Cup, he, Castro, Calvin Oftana, and Kim Aurin combined to score 36 points in the third quarter to turn a 42–62 halftime deficit into an 84–81 lead. TNT eventually won the game and he finished with 23 points and eight rebounds. In Game 1 of the quarterfinals, he scored 26 points as they took the first win. In Game 3, he had 22 points, but cramped up in the last 2:19. TNT eventually lost by one point and they failed to make the semis.

==== 2024–present: Chasing the Grand Slam ====
Pogoy played a vital role in TNT's 2024 Governors' Cup Finals campaign against Ginebra. Although his scoring fell off from 13.7 points before the Finals to 10.5 points in the first two games of the series, he was critical in guarding Justin Brownlee. In Game 4, he scored 16 points on three triples and a four-pointer to help TNT take a 3–2 lead. In Game 6, he hit a clutch triple with less than a minute left that sealed the win for TNT and gave him his third PBA championship.

In the 2024–25 Commissioner's Cup finals against Ginebra, Pogoy stepped up with Castro out due to a knee injury. In their Game 1 win, he scored 15 points on five triples. However, his shooting fell off for the rest of the series, as he missed eight of his 12 shots in Game 2, and went 3-of-10 in Game 5 as Ginebra took a 3–2 lead. In Game 7, he cramped up during the fourth quarter, but his teammates Hollis-Jefferson, Oftana, Rey Nambatac, and Glenn Khobuntin stepped up to win the game for TNT and win their second championship of the season. The win also gave TNT the chance to compete for a grand slam.

TNT started the 2025 Philippine Cup with three straight losses. In their game against San Miguel, Pogoy made a game-sealing three-pointer that gave them their first win of the conference. In a win over Meralco, he had a season-high 32 points. He then reset it the following game to 35 points in a win over Rain or Shine. During their quarterfinal series against Magnolia, he reached the 5,000 points scored milestone. He scored 30 points in Game 1 and closed out the series with 18 points in Game 2. In Game 1 of their semifinal series against Rain or Shine, he led them to the opening win with 28 points. In Game 2, he went down with a left hamstring injury in the first half, but TNT was still able to take a 2–0 series lead. He missed the rest of the series, but TNT still made it to the finals against San Miguel. He returned for Game 1, where he contributed 23 points in the opening win. TNT took the series to six games before the Beermen eventually won the championship.

== Career statistics ==
=== PBA ===
Legend
GP	Games played	MPG	Minutes per game	FG%	Field-goal percentage
3FG%	3-point field-goal percentage	4P%	4-point field-goal percentage	FT%	Free-throw percentage
RPG	Rebounds per game	APG	Assists per game	SPG	Steals per game
BPG	Blocks per game	PPG	Points per game	127	Career high

As of the end of 2024–25 season

==== Season-by-season averages ====
Year	Team	GP	MPG	FG%	3P%	4P%	FT%	RPG	APG	SPG	BPG	PPG
2016–17	TNT	58	27.9	.418	.326	—	.559	4.1	1.2	.8	.4	11.1
2017–18	TNT	37	26.4	.423	.230	—	.671	5.0	1.8	1.3	.4	12.7
2019	TNT	53	36.9	.444	.350	—	.631	5.6	1.6	1.8	.3	16.6
2020	TNT	22	36.4	.412	.318	—	.831	5.7	2.5	2.0	.2	20.0
2021	TNT	33	30.8	.380	.232	—	.700	3.9	1.8	1.5	.5	13.5
2022–23	TNT	55	33.9	.450	.413	—	.660	4.0	2.0	1.3	.5	18.3
2023–24	TNT	15	33.3	.452	.400	—	.790	4.1	2.1	.7	.3	19.5
2024–25	TNT	69	33.2	.440	.363	.250	.730	3.1	1.9	1.1	.2	13.8
Career		342	32.2	.430	.340	.250	.684	4.3	1.8	1.3	.3	15.0

=== College ===
==== Elimination rounds ====
Year	Team	GP	MPG	FG%	3P%	FT%	RPG	APG	SPG	BPG	PPG
2011-12	FEU	11	4.7	.556	.000	.571	1.8	.4	.2	.1	2.2
2012-13	FEU	14	20.7	.474	.143	.765	5.5	1.5	.5	.6	6.2
2013-14	FEU	14	21.2	.415	.320	.778	6.0	1.4	.5	.6	6.4
2014-15	FEU	14	24.1	.442	.379	.432	5.9	2.0	.9	.5	8.5
2015-16	FEU	14	20.1	.394	.342	.636	3.7	1.5	.5	.9	10.8
Career		67	18.8	.431	.324	.604	4.7	1.4	.5	.6	7.0

==== Playoffs ====
Year	Team	GP	MPG	FG%	3P%	FT%	RPG	APG	SPG	BPG	PPG
2013-14	FEU	2	21.5	.308	.333	-	7.0	1.0	1.0	-	5.0
2014-15	FEU	6	24.7	.302	.300	.429	6.3	1.5	.7	1.2	5.8
2015-16	FEU	4	25.4	.333	.323	.750	4.0	1.0	.8	.8	14.3
Career		12	24.4	.319	.319	.577	5.7	1.3	.8	.8	8.5

== National team career ==
Pogoy first played for the national team in the SEABA Stankovic Cup in 2016. He was also on the 24-man list for the 2016 Olympic Qualifying Tournament (OQT) in Manila. He also joined the team for the 2016 FIBA Asia Challenge. He averaged 6.8 points, 4.2 rebounds and 1.6 assists in the tournament.

Pogoy was named to the 2017 SEABA Championship lineup and the 2017 William Jones Cup lineup. His team also finished 7th in the 2017 FIBA Asia Cup. He also participated in the November 2017 window and February 2018 window for the 2019 FIBA Asia World Cup Qualifiers.

In 2018, Pogoy was on the Gilas 3x3 team for the 2018 FIBA 3x3 World Cup. He scored 4 points in his debut against Brazil. They lost their next games against Mongolia and Canada but finished their campaign with a win against Russia to finish 3rd in Pool D.

=== Role in Philippines–Australia brawl ===
In a game against Australia in the July 2018 window, Pogoy hit Australian player Chris Goulding with two hard fouls, one away from the play. Daniel Kickert, Goulding's teammate, retaliated by giving him a similar hard foul with his elbow and forearm. Kickert's response caused Andray Blatche and Jayson Castro to rush him to retaliate. Other Filipino players from the bench rushed onto the court to join the brawl. He apologized for his actions and was suspended for 5 games.

=== Return and subsequent competitions ===
Pogoy made his return after his suspension in a game against Kazakhstan. He was also on the 2019 FIBA World Cup lineup. Pogoy only shot 42% from the field and 25% on threes for the tournament. He was also selected to join the Gilas squad for the 2019 Southeast Asian Games but was unable to play due to a nerve root irritation caused by a bulging disc.

Before the pandemic, he played against Indonesia in the FIBA Asia Cup 2021 Qualifiers.

In 2022, he played in the February qualifiers for the 2023 FIBA World Cup. He also got a silver medal in the 31st SEA Games.

Pogoy was included in the 21-man pool for the 2023 FIBA World Cup, where he was eventually included in the final 12-man lineup. He was set to play in the Asian Games, but due to health problems, he had to withdraw.

== Personal life ==
A few weeks after winning his first championship in 2021, Pogoy married his longtime girlfriend Love Portes. They have a daughter, Louvie, and a son, Roger Raynn.
