= Josh Reyes =

Filipino basketball coach

TNT Tropang 5G
- Position: Assistant coach
- League: PBA

Career information
- College: FEU
- Coaching career: 2011–present

Career history

Coaching
- 2011–present: TNT Tropang 5G (assistant)
- 2013–2018: Philippines (assistant)
- 2013–2017: FEU (assistant)
- 2018, 2022–2024: Philippines U18
- 2022–2024: Philippines U17
- 2022–present: Philippines (assistant)

Career highlights
- As assistant coach: 7× PBA champion (2011–12 Philippine, 2012–13 Philippine, 2015 Commissioner's, 2021 Philippine, 2023 Governors', 2024 Governors', 2024–25 Commissioner's); PCCL champion (2015); UAAP champions (2015)
Medals
Men's basketball
Assistant coach for Philippines
FIBA Asia Cup
Silver medal – second place	2013 Manila	Team
Silver medal – second place	2015 Changsha–Hunan	Team
FIBA Asia Cup
Bronze medal – third place	2014 Wuhan	Team
Southeast Asian Games
Silver medal – second place	2021 Hanoi	Team
Gold medal – first place	2023 Phnom Penh	Team
Asian Games
Gold medal – first place	2022 Hangzhou	Team

Joshua Vincent Reyes is a Filipino professional basketball coach who currently serves as an assistant coach for the TNT Tropang 5G of Philippine Basketball Association (PBA).

== Career ==
Reyes has been an assistant coach for the Far Eastern University, TNT Tropang Giga, and the Philippine national team.

=== TNT Tropang Giga ===
At the 2022 Philippine Cup finals, Reyes was able to lead the coaching of the team in game 7 after his father, the head coach of the team by that time was rendered unavailable due to COVID-19 pandemic protocols.

=== Philippines youth ===
He became part of the Philippine national youth program when he was made part of the staff of head coach Mike Oliver of the team which took part in the 2017 FIBA Under-16 Asian Championship and the 2018 FIBA U17 Basketball World Cup.

Reyes was elevated as head coach and made to lead the Philippine U18 youth team which took part in the 2018 FIBA Under-18 Asian Championship. The team finished fourth, clinching the country a place in the 2019 FIBA Under-19 Basketball World Cup in Greece.

However he was removed from his position, following a "reshuffling" in the whole Philippine national team program in response to the Philippines–Australia brawl in July 2018, which involved his father Chot.

Reyes returned to the youth program, coaching the U17 team. He helped them qualify for the 2024 FIBA Under-17 Basketball World Cup after reaching the semifinals of the 2023 FIBA U16 Asian Championship in Qatar. He resigned from his position on September 20, 2024.

=== Philippine national team ===
In September 2023, Reyes was tapped as one of the assistant coach of the national team for the 2023 Asian Games.

=== Other involvement ===
Reyes was an analyst for the ASEAN Basketball League.

== Personal life ==
Reyes is the son of Chot Reyes, who has been the head coach of the Philippines men's national basketball team and various teams in the Philippine Basketball Association. His mother is Cherry Reyes, who is a businesswoman.

He is married to Maybel Natividad, daughter of film director Toto Natividad.
