= Mikey Williams (basketball, born 1991) =

Filipino-American basketball player

No. 10 – Converge FiberXers
- Position: Shooting guard / point guard
- League: PBA

Personal information
- Born: October 27, 1991 (age 35) Los Angeles, California, U.S.
- Listed height: 6 ft 2 in (1.88 m)
- Listed weight: 190 lb (86 kg)

Career information
- High school: William Howard Taft (Woodland Hills, California)
- College: San Francisco (2009–2012); Cal State Fullerton (2013–2014)
- NBA draft: 2014: undrafted
- PBA draft: 2020: 1st round4th overall (Note: The 2021 draft was composed of two drafts: the Gilas special round, which consists of 4 players reserved for the Gilas Pilipinas program, and the regular draft. Williams was selected as the fourth pick of the regular draft.)
- Drafted by: TNT Tropang Giga
- Playing career: 2014–present

Career history
- 2014–2015: Sioux Falls Skyforce
- 2016–2017: Canton Charge
- 2017–2018: Saigon Heat
- 2019–2020: GenSan Warriors
- 2021–2023: TNT Tropang Giga
- 2026–present: Converge FiberXers

Career highlights
- 2× PBA champion (2021 Philippine, 2023 Governors'); 2× PBA Finals MVP (2021 Philippine, 2023 Governors'); PBA All-Star (2023); PBA First Mythical Team (2021); PBA Second Mythical Team (2023); PBA Rookie of the Year (2021); PBA All-Rookie Team (2021); PBA scoring champion (2021); PBA Co-Order of Merit (2021); First-team All-WCC (2011); Second-team All-Big West (2014); Big West Newcomer of the Year (2014)

Michael Kurtiz Baldo Williams (born October 27, 1991) is a Filipino American professional basketball player for the Converge FiberXers of the Philippine Basketball Association (PBA).

== Collegiate career ==
In his senior year at Cal State Fullerton, he scored a collegiate high of 29 points to go along with 6 rebounds in a losing effort to UCSB Gauchos.

== Professional career ==
After he became undrafted in 2014 NBA draft, Williams played for Sioux Falls Skyforce in NBA G League from 2014 to 2016, and in Canton Charge from 2016 to 2017.

He also played as a heritage import for Saigon Heat in ASEAN Basketball League from 2017 to 2018. He then played for the GenSan Warriors of Maharlika Pilipinas Basketball League from 2018 to 2019, wherein he averaged 15.9 points, 6.6 assists, 5.1 rebounds, and 1.1 steals per game.

=== TNT Tropang Giga (2021–2023) ===
Williams made a PBA finals record 10 three-pointers in a 98–106 loss to the Magnolia Hotshots in Game 3 of the 2021 PBA Philippine Cup finals.

Williams would miss almost half of the 2022 Philippine Cup amidst months-long negotiations regarding his contract. Williams would later sign a three-year extension with TNT.

However, Williams stopped showing up for games since the 2023 Governors' Cup. In November 2023, TNT terminated its contract with Williams although retaining his rights, meaning he cannot transfer to another PBA team without TNT releasing him.

=== Converge FiberXers (2026–present) ===
On June 2, 2025, Williams' rights were acquired by the Converge FiberXers from the TNT in exchange for Jordan Heading. On March 4, 2026, Williams officially signed a one-year contract with the team, ending his three-year hiatus from the PBA.

== PBA career statistics ==
Legend
GP	Games played	MPG	Minutes per game
FG%	Field-goal percentage	3P%	3-point field-goal percentage	FT%	Free-throw percentage
RPG	Rebounds per game	APG	Assists per game	SPG	Steals per game
BPG	Blocks per game	PPG	Points per game	**Bold**	Career high

As of the end of 2022–23 season

Led the league

=== Season-by-season averages ===
Year	Team	GP	MPG	FG%	3P%	FT%	RPG	APG	SPG	BPG	PPG
2021	TNT	36	**36.3**	**.410**	**.376**	**.730**	**4.4**	**4.4**	**.9**	.1	**19.5**
2022–23	TNT	**51**	35.5	.397	.367	.642	3.9	4.1	.7	.1	18.4
Career		87	35.8	.403	.371	.677	4.1	4.2	.8	.1	18.9
