= 2021 PBA season =

46th PBA season

- Duration: July 16 – August 3, 2021 (before first suspension); September 1, 2021 – December 26, 2021 (first resumption, second suspension); February 11, 2022 – April 22, 2022 (second resumption)
- Teams: 12
- TV partner(s): Local: One Sports; TV5; One Sports; PBA Rush (HD); International: AksyonTV International; Online: Cignal Play

PBA season 46
- Top draft pick: Joshua Munzon
- Picked by: Terrafirma Dyip
- Season MVP: Scottie Thompson (Barangay Ginebra San Miguel)
- Top scorer: Mikey Williams (TNT Tropang Giga)
- Philippine Cup champions: TNT Tropang Giga
- Philippine Cup runners-up: Magnolia Pambansang Manok Hotshots
- Governors' Cup champions: Barangay Ginebra San Miguel
- Governors' Cup runners-up: Meralco Bolts

Seasons
- ← 2020 2022–23 (S47) →

The 2021 PBA season was the 46th season of the Philippine Basketball Association. Due to the COVID-19 pandemic, the season's start, originally scheduled on April 11, 2021, has been delayed until July 16, 2021. The league's Board of Governors announced that the season had two conferences: the Philippine Cup and the Governors' Cup.

The first activity of the season was the PBA season 46 draft held on March 14, 2021.

== Executive board ==
- Commissioner: Willie Marcial
- Chairman: Ricky Vargas (Representing TNT Tropang Giga)
- Vice-Chairman: Demosthenes Rosales (Representing Terrafirma Dyip)
- Treasurer: Richard Bachmann (Representing Alaska Aces)

== Teams ==
Team	Company	Governor	Coach	Captain
Alaska Aces	Alaska Milk Corporation	Richard Bachmann	Jeffrey Cariaso	Jeron Teng
Barangay Ginebra San Miguel	Ginebra San Miguel, Inc.	Alfrancis Chua	Tim Cone	LA Tenorio
Blackwater Bossing	Ever Bilena Cosmetics, Inc.	Silliman Sy	Ariel Vanguardia (interim)	KG Canaleta
Magnolia Pambansang Manok Hotshots	San Miguel Pure Foods Company, Inc.	Rene Pardo	Chito Victolero	Rafi Reavis
Meralco Bolts	Manila Electric Company	Al Panlilio	Norman Black	Cliff Hodge
NLEX Road Warriors	Metro Pacific Investments Corporation	Rodrigo Franco	Yeng Guiao	Kevin Alas
NorthPort Batang Pier	Sultan 900 Capital, Inc.	Eric Arejola	Pido Jarencio	Kevin Ferrer
Phoenix Super LPG Fuel Masters	Phoenix Petroleum Philippines, Inc.	Raymond Zorrilla	Topex Robinson	Matthew Wright
Rain or Shine Elasto Painters	Asian Coatings Philippines, Inc.	Mamerto Mondragon	Chris Gavina	Gabe Norwood
San Miguel Beermen	San Miguel Brewery, Inc.	Robert Non	Leo Austria	Chris Ross
Terrafirma Dyip	Terrafirma Realty Development Corporation	Demosthenes Rosales	Johnedel Cardel	Eric Camson
TNT Tropang Giga	Smart Communications	Ricky Vargas	Chot Reyes	Jayson Castro

== Player quotas ==
=== Filipino-foreigners ===
The PBA allows for each team to have up to five players classified as "Filipino-foreigners" in their roster. Filipino-foreigners are natural-born Filipinos who are born outside the Philippines. Natural-born Filipinos born inside the Philippines are not classified as such, and a team can as many of them as roster size permits. (Note: Nationality indicates the player's place of birth, and may not necessarily hold the associated foreign citizenship. All players have Filipino citizenship.)

Team	Player 1	Player 2	Player 3	Player 4	Player 5	Replaced
Alaska Aces	(Palestine) Yousef Taha	(United States) Maverick Ahanmisi	(United States) Michael DiGregorio	(United States) Robbie Herndon	(United States) Alec Stockton	(Canada) Taylor Browne
Barangay Ginebra San Miguel	(Germany) Christian Standhardinger	(United States) Joe Devance	(United States) Jared Dillinger	(United States) Brian Enriquez	(United States) Stanley Pringle	
Blackwater Bossing	(Australia) David Semerad	(United States) Simon Enciso	(United States) Kelly Nabong	(United States) Andre Paras	(United States) Joshua Torralba	
Magnolia Pambansang Manok Hotshots	(United States) Jerrick Ahanmisi	(United States) Loren Brill	(United States) Rome dela Rosa	(Australia) James Laput	(United States) Rafi Reavis	
Meralco Bolts	(United States) Cliff Hodge	(United States) Trevis Jackson	(United States) Chris Newsome			
NLEX Road Warriors	(Australia) Anthony Semerad	(Tonga) Asi Taulava				
NorthPort Batang Pier	(United States) Jamie Malonzo	(United States) Troy Rike	(United States) Greg Slaughter			
Phoenix Super LPG Fuel Masters	(Canada) Matthew Wright	(United States) Chris Banchero	(United States) Jason Perkins	(United States) Sean Manganti	(Canada) Sean Anthony	
Rain or Shine Elasto Painters	(Canada) Norbert Torres	(United States) Franky Johnson	(United States) Gabe Norwood	(United States) Adrian Wong		
San Miguel Beermen	(Hong Kong) CJ Perez	(United States) Marcio Lassiter	(United States) Chris Ross	(United States) Moala Tautuaa		
Terrafirma Dyip	(United States) Kyle Pascual	(Sweden) Andreas Cahilig	(United States) Roosevelt Adams	(United States) Rashawn McCarthy	(United States) Joshua Munzon	
TNT Tropang Giga	(United States) Kelly Williams	(United States) Mikey Williams				

=== Imports ===
Naturalized Filipinos and foreigners can play as imports. They can only play in import-laced conferences, and usually a team is mandated to have at least one for the duration of the tournament.

A list of imports was provided on those conferences' articles.

== Arenas ==
Due to the COVID-19 pandemic in Metro Manila, the season started to be played at Ynares Sports Arena in Pasig, in a closed-circuit format, with no spectators allowed for the meantime. On August 6, Metro Manila (of which Pasig is included) was placed under enhanced community quarantine, the highest level of quarantine; the league originally planned to continue at Lipa, Batangas. The Inter-Agency Task Force for the Management of Emerging Infectious Diseases (IATF-EID) allowed the PBA to resume in places which were under either modified general community quarantine (MGCQ) or regular general community quarantine (GCQ); with the placement of Batangas under GCQ with heightened restrictions, this removed it from the places the league can play at. The PBA settled in their choice to play in Pampanga for the meantime, as they don't see the quarantine classification in Metro Manila from going to regular GCQ. The PBA then got permission to play in the Don Honorio Ventura State University gym in Bacolor.

For the first two weeks of the 2021 PBA Governors' Cup, the league returned to the Ynares Sports Arena. Quezon City then gave the permission for sports events to be held there with spectators; the PBA was expected to play at the Araneta Coliseum for the rest of the year starting December 15. At the start of 2022, the PBA was also expected to return at the Mall of Asia Arena. However, with the rise of COVID-19 cases in Metro Manila, the IATF-EID placed Metro Manila under alert level 3, causing the league to postpone the games for the week starting January 3.

When the Governors' Cup resumed on February 11, the league announced that the games would be played at the Ynares Center in Antipolo for the duration of the 2023 FIBA Basketball World Cup qualification round to be played from February 24 to 28 at the Smart Araneta Coliseum.

The league began playing at Mall of Asia Arena on March 23 during the Governors' Cup semifinals.

Arena	City
Don Honorio Ventura State University gym	Bacolor, Pampanga
SM Mall of Asia Arena	Pasay
Smart Araneta Coliseum	Quezon City
Ynares Center	Antipolo, Rizal
Ynares Sports Arena	Pasig

== Transactions ==
=== Retirement ===
- On January 24, Cyrus Baguio announced his retirement. Baguio played for 6 franchises in his 17 seasons in the association.
- On February 1, Harvey Carey announced his retirement. Carey played for TNT Tropang Giga for 17 seasons.
- On March 21, JC Intal announced his retirement. Intal played for 4 franchises in his 13 seasons in the association.
- On May 15, Jay-R Reyes announced his retirement. Reyes played for 8 franchises in his 14 seasons in the association.
- On May 25, Marc Pingris announced his retirement. Pingris played for 3 franchises in his 15 seasons in the association.
- On December 29, Garvo Lanete announced his retirement. Lanete played for 3 franchises in his 6 seasons in the association.

=== Coaching changes ===
Coaching changes
Team	Occurrence	Previous coach	New coach	Ref.
TNT Tropang Giga	Off-season	Bong Ravena	Chot Reyes	
Rain or Shine Elasto Painters	Off-season	Caloy Garcia	Chris Gavina	
Blackwater Bossing	In season	Nash Racela	Ariel Vanguardia	

== Notable events ==
=== Pre-season ===
- The PBA Board of Governors approved a two-conference format this season. One All-Filipino tournament (Philippine Cup) to be held for four months and one import-laced tournament (Governors' Cup) to be held for six months.
- On March 12, Ricky Vargas of TNT KaTropa was re-elected for a fourth consecutive term as the Chairman of the PBA Board of Governors. Bobby Rosales of Terrafirma Dyip was re-elected as Vice Chairman, while Richard "Dickie" Bachmann of the Alaska Aces was elected as treasurer. Bachmann was also appointed as the chairman of the PBA 3×3 tournament. Vargas became the longest-serving head of the PBA Board of Governors since the presidency of Ginebra San Miguel's Carlos "Honeyboy" Palanca III (1983 to 1986) and the chairmanship of Formula Shell's Reynaldo Marquez (1987 to 1990).
- July 9: The Inter-Agency Task Force for the Management of Emerging Infectious Diseases (IATF-EID) have approved the proposal from the league to open its 46th season on July 16. The announcement came from the monthly Games and Amusements Board press conference.

=== Philippine Cup ===
- July 18: Barangay Ginebra San Miguel started wearing their "Bagong Tapang" jerseys. The jerseys replace their light uniforms. The said jerseys were launched in April and were made available to fans beginning on May 1.
- July 21: Four games involving the TNT Tropang Giga and the Terrafirma Dyip were postponed due to TNT players' inconclusive COVID-19 test results.
- August 3: The league suspended their games beginning August 4 after the government declared that Metro Manila was under Enhanced Community Quarantine from August 6 to 20. The league have appealed to the Inter-Agency Task Force for the Management of Emerging Infectious Diseases (IATF-EID) if they can continue their tournament in Batangas, which was under a more relaxed quarantine restrictions.
- August 23: The league announced that they got the approval of Pampanga governor Dennis Pineda to resume their games at the Don Honorio Ventura State University in Bacolor starting September 1.

=== Midseason break ===
- The league announced that the inaugural 3x3 season would start on November 20.
- November 9: The PBA board of governors have approved to revise the league's policy for Fil-foreigner to be eligible for the PBA draft. Fil-foreigners are only required to submit a Philippine passport upon application to the draft. The board also increased the number of Fil-foreigner players per team from five to seven.

=== Governors' Cup ===
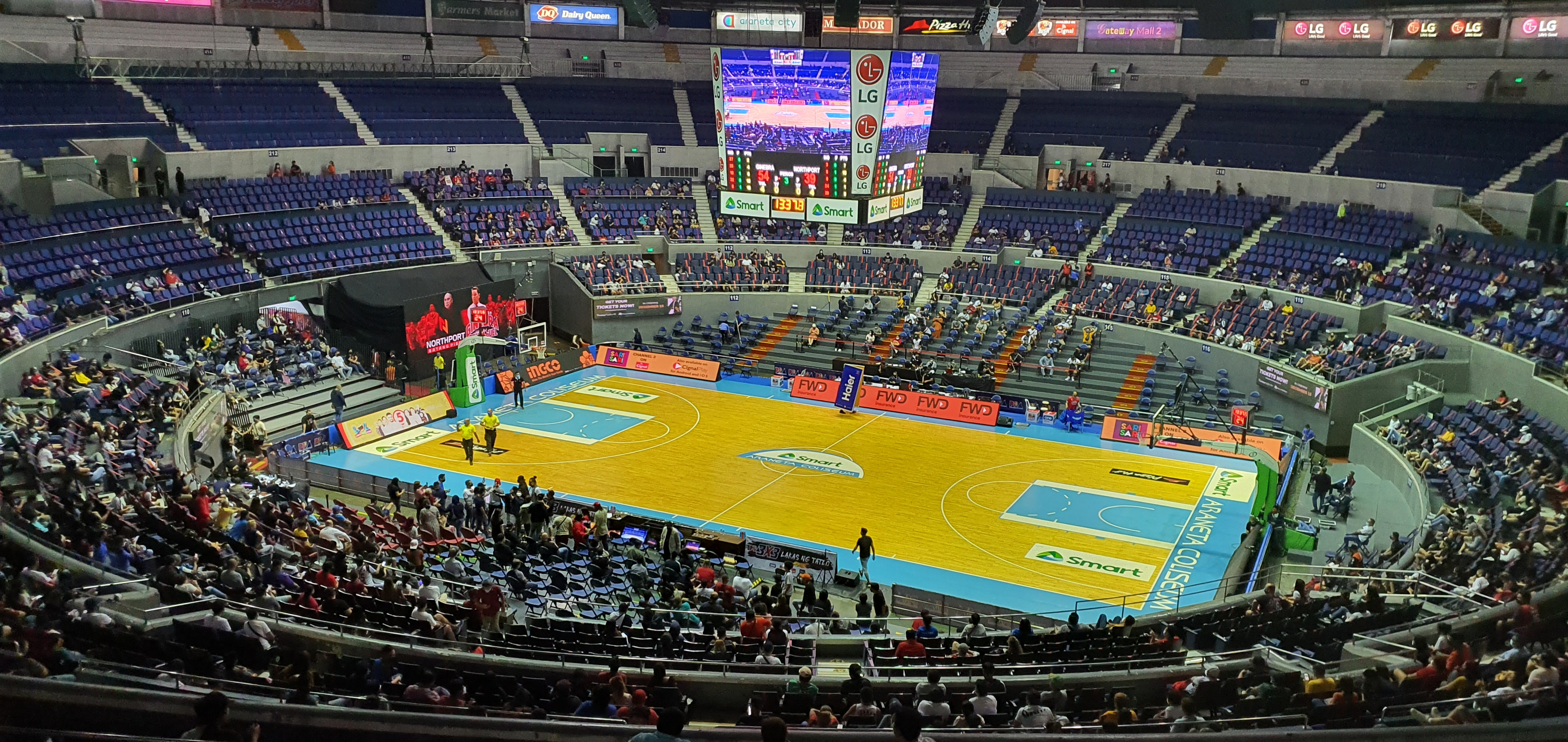
A view of the Smart Araneta Coliseum during the halftime break of the game between the Barangay Ginebra San Miguel and NorthPort Batang Pier.

- December 10: The Quezon City government approved the PBA's request to play their games with spectators. The games were played at the Smart Araneta Coliseum with half capacity allowed starting December 15.
- December 25: The Magnolia Pambansang Manok Hotshots retired the jersey numbers of PJ Simon (#8) and Marc Pingris (#15), during halftime of their game against Barangay Ginebra San Miguel.
- January 3, 2022: The league postpones its scheduled games for the first week of January after Metro Manila was put on Alert Level 3 due to the rising COVID-19 cases.
- January 6: The league postpones the Governors' Cup indefinitely. Team scrimmages are also suspended.
- January 30: The league announced that the Governors' Cup would resume on February 11. Subsequently, the league announced on February 12 that spectators were allowed to watch the games inside the playing venues beginning February 16.
- February 16: Alaska Aces team owner Wilfred Uytengsu announced that the franchise was leaving the PBA at the end of the 2021 season.
- February 18: The PBA announced that the Hong Kong-based Bay Area Chun Yu Phoenixes from EASL would enter the league as a guest team during the Governors' Cup of season 47. Their participation was formally announced on March 21. It was also announced that the team would compete under the name Bay Area Dragons, so as not to confuse their nickname with current PBA team Phoenix Super LPG.
- February 28: After the IATF-EID announced that Metro Manila would be under Alert Level 1 from March 1 to 15, the league announced that the Smart Araneta Coliseum would be back to full capacity starting on March 2.
- March 6: The Alaska Aces retired the jersey number of Sonny Thoss (#7), during halftime of their game against Magnolia Pambansang Manok Hotshots.
- March 19: The Alaska Aces played its final PBA game after being eliminated by the NLEX Road Warriors in their do-or-die quarterfinal game, 96–80. At the end of the game, the league held a short tribute to the Alaska franchise then Commissioner Willie Marcial sounded the ceremonial "final buzzer" at center court.
- March 23: The PBA Board of Governors unanimously approved the sale of the Alaska franchise to Converge ICT Solutions Inc. Former PBA commissioner Chito Salud became its team governor.
- April 20: A fire broke out at the construction area beside the Smart Araneta Coliseum at around 11:00 am while the games of the 2021 PBA 3x3 second conference grand finals was underway. The 3x3 games were postponed and subsequently, Game 6 of the Governors' Cup finals between Barangay Ginebra and Meralco were rescheduled to April 22.

== Opening ceremonies ==
The opening ceremony for this season was held at the Ynares Sports Arena in Pasig on July 16, 2021. Due to COVID-19 related restrictions, the traditional parade of teams with muses was not done and a “simple” opening ceremonies were held instead.

The first game of the Philippine Cup between the Alaska Aces and the Blackwater Bossing was played after the opening ceremonies.

== Philippine Cup ==
The Philippine Cup started on July 16, was suspended on August 3, restarted on September 1, and ended on October 29, 2021.

=== Elimination round ===
Pos	Team	W	L	PCT	GB	Qualification
1	TNT Tropang Giga	10	1	.909	—	Twice-to-beat in the quarterfinals
2	Meralco Bolts	9	2	.818	1	Twice-to-beat in the quarterfinals
3	Magnolia Pambansang Manok Hotshots	8	3	.727	2	Best-of-three quarterfinals
4	San Miguel Beermen	7	4	.636	3	Best-of-three quarterfinals
5	NorthPort Batang Pier	6	5	.545 (Note: Head-to-head record: NorthPort 1–0 Rain or Shine)	4	Best-of-three quarterfinals
6	Rain or Shine Elasto Painters	6	5	.545	4	Best-of-three quarterfinals
7	NLEX Road Warriors	5	6	.455	5	Twice-to-win in the quarterfinals
8	Barangay Ginebra San Miguel	4	7	.364 (Note: Head-to-head quotient: Phoenix 1.03, Barangay Ginebra 1.01, Terrafirma 0.96; eighth seed playoff: Barangay Ginebra 95–85 Phoenix)	6	Twice-to-win in the quarterfinals
9	Phoenix Super LPG Fuel Masters	4	7	.364	6	
10	Terrafirma Dyip	4	7	.364	6	
11	Alaska Aces	3	8	.273	7	
12	Blackwater Bossing	0	11	.000	10	

Source: PBA.ph
Rules for classification: 1) winning percentage; 2) if two teams are tied, head-to-head record; if three or more teams are tied, head-to-head goal average (quotient), if tied for 8th, one-game playoff; 3) overall quotient 4) coin toss

=== Playoffs ===
Quarterfinals
(#1 twice-to-beat)
1	TNT	84
8	Barangay Ginebra	71
(Best-of-3)
4	San Miguel	2
5	NorthPort	0
(#2 twice-to-beat)
2	Meralco	80	97
7	NLEX	81	86
(Best-of-3)
3	Magnolia	2
6	Rain or Shine	0

Semifinals (Best-of-7)
1	TNT	4
4	San Miguel	3
2	Meralco	2
3	Magnolia	4

Finals (Best-of-7)
1	TNT	4
3	Magnolia	1

==== Quarterfinals ====
Team 1	Series	Team 2	Game 1	Game 2
(1) TNT Tropang Giga*	1–0	(8) Barangay Ginebra San Miguel	84–71	—
(2) Meralco Bolts*	1–1	(7) NLEX Road Warriors	80–81	97–86

Team 1	Series	Team 2	Game 1	Game 2	Game 3
(3) Magnolia Pambansang Manok Hotshots	2–0	(6) Rain or Shine Elasto Painters	81–70	96–86	—
(4) San Miguel Beermen	2–0	(5) NorthPort Batang Pier	88–87	100–95	—

*Team has twice-to-beat advantage. Team 1 only has to win once, while Team 2 has to win twice.

==== Semifinals ====
Team 1	Series	Team 2	Game 1	Game 2	Game 3	Game 4	Game 5	Game 6	Game 7
(1) TNT Tropang Giga	4–3	(4) San Miguel Beermen	89–88	96–98	115–98	90–116	110–90	90–103	97–79
(2) Meralco Bolts	2–4	(3) Magnolia Pambansang Manok Hotshots	79–88	78–92	91–86	69–81	102–98	85–93	—

==== Finals ====
Team 1	Series	Team 2	Game 1	Game 2	Game 3	Game 4	Game 5	Game 6	Game 7
(1) TNT Tropang Giga	4–1	(3) Magnolia Pambansang Manok Hotshots	88–70	105–93	98–106	106–89	94–79	—	—

- Finals MVP: Mikey Williams (TNT Tropang Giga)
- Best Player of the Conference: Calvin Abueva (Magnolia Pambansang Manok Hotshots)

== Governors' Cup ==
The Governors' Cup started on December 6, 2021, was suspended on January 5, 2022, restarted on February 11, and ended on April 22.

=== Elimination round ===
Pos	Team	W	L	PCT	GB	Qualification
1	Magnolia Pambansang Manok Hotshots	9	2	.818	—	Twice-to-beat in quarterfinals
2	NLEX Road Warriors	8	3	.727	1	Twice-to-beat in quarterfinals
3	TNT Tropang Giga	7	4	.636 (Note: Head-to-head quotient: TNT 1.07, Meralco 0.99, San Miguel 0.95)	2	Twice-to-beat in quarterfinals
4	Meralco Bolts	7	4	.636	2	Twice-to-beat in quarterfinals
5	San Miguel Beermen	7	4	.636	2	Twice-to-win in quarterfinals
6	Barangay Ginebra San Miguel	6	5	.545 (Note: Head-to-head record: Barangay Ginebra 1–0 Alaska)	3	Twice-to-win in quarterfinals
7	Alaska Aces	6	5	.545	3	Twice-to-win in quarterfinals
8	Phoenix Super LPG Fuel Masters	5	6	.455 (Note: Eighth seed playoff: Phoenix 101–98 NorthPort)	4	Twice-to-win in quarterfinals
9	NorthPort Batang Pier	5	6	.455	4	
10	Rain or Shine Elasto Painters	3	8	.273	6	
11	Terrafirma Dyip	2	9	.182	7	
12	Blackwater Bossing	1	10	.091	8	

Source: PBA.ph
Rules for classification: 1) winning percentage; 2) if two teams are tied, head-to-head record; if three or more teams are tied, head-to-head goal average (quotient), if tied for 8th, one-game playoff; 3) overall quotient 4) coin toss

=== Playoffs ===
Quarterfinals (Top 4 twice-to-beat)
1	Magnolia	127
8	Phoenix Super LPG	88
4	Meralco	100
5	San Miguel	85
2	NLEX	79	96
7	Alaska	93	80
3	TNT	92	95
6	Barangay Ginebra	104	115

Semifinals (Best-of-5)
1	Magnolia	2
4	Meralco	3
2	NLEX	1
6	Barangay Ginebra	3

Finals (Best-of-7)
4	Meralco	2
6	Barangay Ginebra	4

==== Quarterfinals ====
Team 1	Series	Team 2	Game 1	Game 2
(1) Magnolia Pambansang Manok Hotshots*	1–0	(8) Phoenix Super LPG Fuel Masters	127–88	—
(2) NLEX Road Warriors*	1–1	(7) Alaska Aces	79–93	96–80
(3) TNT Tropang Giga*	0–2	(6) Barangay Ginebra San Miguel	92–104	95–115
(4) Meralco Bolts*	1–0	(5) San Miguel Beermen	100–85	—

*Team has twice-to-beat advantage. Team 1 only has to win once, while Team 2 has to win twice.

==== Semifinals ====
Team 1	Series	Team 2	Game 1	Game 2	Game 3	Game 4	Game 5
(1) Magnolia Pambansang Manok Hotshots	2–3	(4) Meralco Bolts	94–80	75–81	95–101	94–73	81–94
(2) NLEX Road Warriors	1–3	(6) Barangay Ginebra San Miguel	86–95	94–104	86–85	93–112	—

==== Finals ====
Team 1	Series	Team 2	Game 1	Game 2	Game 3	Game 4	Game 5	Game 6	Game 7
(4) Meralco Bolts	2–4	(6) Barangay Ginebra San Miguel	104–91	93–99	83–74	84–95	110–115	92–103	–

- Finals MVP: Scottie Thompson (Barangay Ginebra San Miguel)
- Best Player of the Conference: Scottie Thompson (Barangay Ginebra San Miguel)
- Bobby Parks Best Import of the Conference: Justin Brownlee (Barangay Ginebra San Miguel)

== Awards ==
=== Leo Awards ===
- Most Valuable Player: Scottie Thompson (Barangay Ginebra)
- Rookie of the Year: Mikey Williams (TNT)
- Most Improved Player: Juami Tiongson (Terrafirma)
- First Mythical Team:
  - Mikey Williams (TNT)
  - Scottie Thompson (Barangay Ginebra)
  - June Mar Fajardo (San Miguel)
  - Calvin Abueva (Magnolia)
  - Arwind Santos (NorthPort)
- Second Mythical Team:
  - Robert Bolick (NorthPort)
  - CJ Perez (San Miguel)
  - Ian Sangalang (Magnolia)
  - Christian Standhardinger (Barangay Ginebra)
  - Matthew Wright (Phoenix)
- All-Defensive Team:
  - Jio Jalalon (Magnolia)
  - Chris Ross (San Miguel)
  - Kelly Williams (TNT)
  - Cliff Hodge (Meralco)
  - Arwind Santos (NorthPort)
- Samboy Lim Sportsmanship Award: Kevin Alas (NLEX)

=== PBA Press Corps Annual Awards ===
- Defensive Player of the Year: Arwind Santos (NorthPort)
- Scoring Champion: Mikey Williams (TNT)
- Baby Dalupan Coach of the Year: Chot Reyes (TNT)
- Mr. Quality Minutes: Allein Maliksi (Meralco)
- Danny Floro Executive of the Year: Alfrancis Chua (Barangay Ginebra)
- Order of Merit:
  - Mikey Williams (TNT)
  - Robert Bolick (NorthPort)
  - Ian Sangalang (Magnolia)
  - Matthew Wright (Phoenix)
- All-Rookie Team
  - Mikey Williams (TNT)
  - Joshua Munzon (Terrafrima)
  - Leonard Santillan (Rain or Shine)
  - Calvin Oftana (NLEX)
  - Jamie Malonzo (NorthPort)
- Game of the Season: San Miguel vs. NorthPort (December 12, 2021, Governors' Cup eliminations)

== Cumulative standings ==
Pos	Team	Pld	W	L	PCT	Best finish
1	TNT Tropang Giga	37	26	11	.703	Champions
2	Magnolia Pambansang Manok Hotshots	41	27	14	.659	Finalist
3	Meralco Bolts	42	25	17	.595	Finalist
4	San Miguel Beermen	32	19	13	.594	Semifinalist
5	Barangay Ginebra San Miguel	36	20	16	.556	Champions
6	NLEX Road Warriors	30	16	14	.533	Semifinalist
7	NorthPort Batang Pier	25	11	14	.440	Quarterfinalist
8	Alaska Aces	24	10	14	.417	Quarterfinalist
9	Phoenix Super LPG Fuel Masters	25	10	15	.400	Quarterfinalist
10	Rain or Shine Elasto Painters	24	9	15	.375	Quarterfinalist
11	Terrafirma Dyip	22	6	16	.273	Elimination round
12	Blackwater Bossing	22	1	21	.045	Elimination round

=== Elimination round ===
Pos	Team	Pld	W	L	PCT
1	TNT Tropang Giga	22	17	5	.773 (Note: Elimination round head-to-head record: TNT 1–1 (GAvg 1.02–0.98) Magnolia)
2	Magnolia Pambansang Manok Hotshots	22	17	5	.773
3	Meralco Bolts	22	16	6	.727
4	San Miguel Beermen	22	14	8	.636
5	NLEX Road Warriors	22	13	9	.591
6	NorthPort Batang Pier	22	11	11	.500
7	Barangay Ginebra San Miguel	22	10	12	.455
8	Alaska Aces	22	9	13	.409 (Note: Elimination round head-to-head quotient: Alaska 1.06, Phoenix 1.04, Rain or Shine 0.90)
9	Phoenix Super LPG Fuel Masters	22	9	13	.409
10	Rain or Shine Elasto Painters	22	9	13	.409
11	Terrafirma Dyip	22	6	16	.273
12	Blackwater Bossing	22	1	21	.045

=== Playoffs ===
This includes one-game playoffs to determine the last playoff participant.

Pos	Team	Pld	W	L
1	Barangay Ginebra San Miguel	14	10	4
2	Magnolia Pambansang Manok Hotshots	19	10	9
3	TNT Tropang Giga	15	9	6
4	Meralco Bolts	20	9	11
5	San Miguel Beermen	10	5	5
6	NLEX Road Warriors	8	3	5
7	Alaska Aces	2	1	1
8	Phoenix Super LPG Fuel Masters	3	1	2
9	Rain or Shine Elasto Painters	2	0	2
10	NorthPort Batang Pier	3	0	3
11	Terrafirma Dyip	0	0	0
12	Blackwater Bossing	0	0	0

== 3x3 ==
The 3x3 season started on November 20, 2021, and ended on July 3, 2022. The final legs of the third conference were held in concurrence with the Philippine Cup of the succeeding PBA season.
