= TNT Tropang 5G =

Philippine professional basketball team

- 2025–26 TNT Tropang 5G season
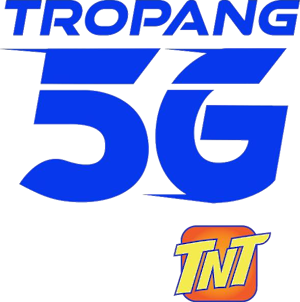
- Founded: 1990
- History: Pepsi Hotshots (1990–1992); 7–Up Uncolas (1992–1993); Pepsi Mega Bottlers (1993–1996); Mobiline Cellulars (1996–1997); Mobiline Phone Pals (1997–2001); Talk 'N Text Phone Pals (2001–2008); Talk 'N Text Tropang Texters (2008–2015); TNT Tropang Texters (2015); Tropang TNT (2016); TNT KaTropa (2016–2020); TNT Tropang Giga (2020–2025); TNT Tropang 5G (2025–present)
- Team colors: Blue, black, yellow, white
- Company: Smart Communications
- Board governor: Ricky Vargas; Jude Turcuato (alternate)
- Team manager: Jojo Lastimosa; Yvette Ruiz (assistant)
- Head coach: Chot Reyes
- Team captain: Calvin Oftana
- Ownership: Manny Pangilinan
- Championships: 11 championships 1998 Centennial*; 2003 All-Filipino; 2008–09 Philippine; 2010–11 Philippine; 2011 Commissioner's; 2011–12 Philippine; 2012–13 Philippine; 2015 Commissioner's; 2021 Philippine; 2023 Governors'; 2024 Governors'; 2024–25 Commissioner's (*) special championship 27 Finals appearances
- Retired numbers: 3 (3, 4, 33)

The TNT Tropang 5G is a professional basketball team currently owned by Smart Communications, a subsidiary of the Philippine Long Distance Telephone Company (PLDT), playing in the Philippine Basketball Association (PBA) since 1990.

The franchise began in 1990 when Pepsi-Cola Products Philippines, Inc. (PCPPI) acquired a PBA franchise. Under PCPPI, the franchise played under the names Pepsi and 7 Up. In 1996, the franchise came under the control of Pilipino Telephone Corporation (Piltel) and played under the name Mobiline. In 2001, the franchise was renamed Talk 'N Text after the operations of Piltel was absorbed by Smart Communications.

Under the MVP Group umbrella, TNT has two sister teams in the Meralco Bolts and NLEX Road Warriors. To date, the franchise has won eleven championships and one special conference championship (1998 PBA Centennial Cup). In 2013, they won their third straight Philippine Cup title, and in doing so, became the first of two teams to have permanent possession of the Jun Bernardino Trophy, the other being the San Miguel Beermen in 2017.

== History ==
=== 1990–1996: The Pepsi / 7-Up era ===
Pepsi-Cola Products Philippines, Inc. joined the PBA in 1990 as the Pepsi Hotshots, alongside rival Pop Cola. Led by coach Ed Ocampo, the team won its inaugural game with import Derek Hamilton scoring 77 points, but subsequently suffered a 15-game losing streak. Derrick Pumaren replaced Ocampo mid-season, though the team finished the year without a win in the third conference.

In 1991, Pepsi acquired Manny Victorino and famously offered a P25 million contract to Alvin Patrimonio, which Purefoods matched. Despite this, the team reached the semifinals of the third conference, finishing fourth. In 1992, the team traded for Eugene Quilban, who set a PBA record with 28 assists in a single game. Following the Pepsi "349" controversy, the team was rebranded as the 7 Up Uncolas.

The 7 Up Uncolas achieved their best finish as runners-up in the 1992 Reinforced Conference, where they were swept in the finals by the Swift Mighty Meaties. In 1993, the team reverted to Pepsi as the Pepsi Mega Bottlers and drafted Victor Pablo, finishing fourth in the Governors' Cup.

In 1994, Pepsi and Sunkist performed a rare coaching trade, sending Pumaren to RFM for Yeng Guiao. Under Guiao, the team placed third in the 1994 Governors' Cup with import Ronnie Coleman. By 1995, despite attempts to sign Jun Limpot to a P28.8 million contract and acquiring veterans Alvin Teng and Dindo Pumaren, the franchise struggled to find consistent success, eventually leading to its transition to the Mobiline era.

=== 1996–2001: The Mobiline era ===
==== 1996–1998: The telecom transition ====
Before the 1996 PBA season, the franchise faced potential disbandment due to shifting marketing priorities at Pepsi-Cola Products Philippines, Inc. A proposed sale to Duty Free Philippines was rejected by the Board of Governors on January 5, 1996. Following a last-place finish in the All-Filipino Cup, ownership was transferred to Lapanday Holdings Corporation. The team was subsequently rebranded as the Mobiline Cellulars through a partnership with Pilipino Telephone Corporation (Piltel).

In 1997, Mobiline acquired the first overall pick and drafted Andy Seigle. The team also signed Tony Boy Espinosa and Patrick Fran, hired coach Norman Black, and acquired 1995 Rookie of the Year Jeffrey Cariaso from Alaska via a record offer sheet. The Cellulars reached the semifinals of the All-Filipino Conference but struggled in the Commissioner's Cup with import Isaiah Morris. For the Governors' Cup, the team hired head coach Derrick Pumaren and consultant Tommy Manotoc, parading import Artemus McClary. Despite an improved performance, they failed to reach the semifinals. Midway through the 1997 season, the team would change its moniker again, this time to Mobiline Phone Pals.

Under Tommy Manotoc, the team struggled with consistency during the 1998 All-Filipino Cup, finishing 7th with a 4–7 record. Despite a standout 27-point performance by Al Solis in a victory over San Miguel on March 8, the team was eliminated before the playoffs. This led to the hiring of Altamirano for the succeeding conferences. Mobiline then appointed Eric Altamirano as their head coach for the following Commissioner's Cup, the team replaced Alex Fraser with 6'8" powerhouse Terquin Mott, who scored 50 points in his debut on May 29. Mobiline finished the eliminations as the 6th seed (5–6) but was eliminated in the quarterfinals by the San Miguel Beermen, 89–95. For the Centennial Cup, Mobiline recruited imports Silas Mills and Artemus "Tee" McClary, finishing the eliminations with a 5–3 record to secure the 2nd seed. On October 4, 1998, the Phone Pals defeated Pop Cola 800s, 74–71, in a knockout semifinal to reach their first championship round. In the one-game final on October 6, Mobiline defeated the Formula Shell Zoom Masters, 67–66, in overtime to capture the first championship in franchise history. For the season-ending Governors' Cup, the Mobiline Phone Pals retained the championship-winning import duo of Silas Mills and Artemus McClary. Coming off their Centennial Cup victory, the team sustained their momentum, finishing the elimination round with a 9–6 record to secure the 3rd seed. In the quarterfinals, Mobiline faced the 6th-seeded Purefoods TJ Hotdogs. The Phone Pals utilized their twice-to-beat advantage, defeating Purefoods 88–77 on November 13, 1998, to advance to their first-ever major best-of-seven semifinal series. The Semifinals vs. Formula Shell Zoom Masters, In a rematch of the Centennial Cup Finals, the two teams engaged in a grueling series. The Phone Pals fell behind 1–3 but rallied to win two straight games to force a deciding Game 7. However, on December 1, 1998, Mobiline lost the final game, 74–87, missing out on a Governors' Cup Finals berth. They settled for fourth place after losing the third-place playoff to San Miguel. Despite the exit, Silas Mills was honored as the Best Import of the Conference.

==== 1999–2001: Asi Taulava's arrival ====
Ahead the 1999 season, franchise signed Fil-Tongan center Asi Taulava as a direct hire. In his debut on February 7, 1999, Taulava recorded 32 points and 20 rebounds in a 90–64 win over the Tanduay Rhum Masters. Led by Taulava and Jeffrey Cariaso, Mobiline won the first seven games of the 1999 All-Filipino Cup and secured the top seed in the All-Filipino Cup with an 11–5 record. In the quarterfinals, the #1 seeded Phone Pals held a twice-to-beat advantage against the #8 Barangay Ginebra Kings. After losing the first game, Mobiline was eliminated in Game 2 on May 12, 1999, when Ginebra's Bal David hit a game-winning jumper at the buzzer for an 81–82 result. This marked the first time in PBA history a #1 seed was eliminated by a #8 seed. The team then brought back Silas Mills for the Commissioner's Cup, but the team finished the eliminations at 3–5. They were eliminated in the quarterfinals by the Alaska Milkmen. During the midseason, the team traded Andy Seigle to Purefoods for veteran Jerry Codiñera. With import Larry Robinson, Mobiline finished as the 7th seed in the Governors' Cup. In the quarterfinals, they forced a do-or-die game against the 2nd-seeded Tanduay Rhum Masters by winning Game 1, 93–78, but ultimately lost the deciding Game 2, 75–84.

In the 2000 All-Filipino Cup, Mobiline finished the elimination round as the 7th seed (5–9) and was eliminated in the quarterfinals by the San Miguel Beermen. Following the exit, head coach Eric Altamirano was replaced by Louie Alas. The conference was further impacted by the deportation of Asi Taulava amid a Department of Justice investigation into "Fil-Shams." To bolster the roster, the team acquired Victor Pablo in a three-team trade involving Jeffrey Cariaso and Mark Telan. Under Coach Alas, the Phone Pals finished the eliminations of the Commissioner's Cup with a 4–5 record. The team initially paraded Carlos Strong before replacing him with J.R. Henderson for the postseason. Seeded 6th, Mobiline faced a "twice-to-win" disadvantage in the quarterfinals against the Tanduay Rhum Masters. On August 20, 2000, Tanduay defeated Mobiline 77–66, ending the Phone Pals' campaign. Mobiline then signed Todd Bernard as the team's import for the 2000 Governors' Cup, where he would lead the team in topping the elimination round with a 7–2 record. They defeated Barangay Ginebra in the quarterfinals to reach the semifinals for the first time in franchise history. Their run ended in the semifinals with a 3–1 series loss to the Purefoods TJ Hotdogs.

The 2001 season was a landmark year as the franchise transitioned from the Mobiline Phone Pals to the Talk 'N Text Phone Pals during the Governors' Cup, following Smart Communications' absorption of Pilipino Telephone Corporation. During the off-season, Mobiline attempted to sign free agent Kenneth Duremdes, but the Alaska Aces matched the offer sheet to retain him. The team drafted Gilbert Demape and Norman Gonzales, and re-signed defensive specialist Patrick Fran, who later earned a spot on the PBA All-Defensive Team. Asi Taulava was cleared to return on June 22, 2001, after being sidelined by citizenship investigations. Entering the 2001 All-Filipino Cup playoffs as the 8th seed (6–8), Mobiline faced the top-seeded Shell Turbo Chargers. Despite forcing a do-or-die game with a 76–72 upset in Game 1, Mobiline lost the deciding Game 2, 80–69, ending their quarterfinal run. The team for the Commissioner's Cup featured import Jerod Ward, who scored 61 points in his debut. Although Taulava returned to the lineup following DOJ approval, the team was eliminated in the quarterfinals by the San Miguel Beermen.

=== 2001–2002: The start of the Talk 'N Text era ===
During the 2001 PBA Governors' Cup, the franchise was renamed the Talk 'N Text Phone Pals after Smart Communications absorbed the operations of Pilipino Telephone Corporation. Under the new moniker, the team finished the elimination round as the 5th seed with a 7–6 record, led by import Brandon Williams. In the quarterfinals, the Phone Pals faced the 4th-seeded San Miguel Beermen, who held a twice-to-beat advantage. On November 16, 2001, San Miguel defeated Talk 'N Text, 77–63, resulting in the team's elimination from the tournament.

For the 2002 PBA season, the team initially hired former UNLV coach Bill Bayno to replace Louie Alas, but his tenure was hindered by legal challenges regarding foreign coaches. Frankie Lim and Paul Woolpert served as bench tacticians during the season. The roster moved toward a younger core, trading veteran Jerry Codiñera and acquiring Mark Telan, Alex Crisano, and Elmer Lago. Asi Taulava and Patrick Fran missed much of the year due to national team duties. Despite Taulava's absence, the Phone Pals secured the #1 seed of the 2002 Governors' Cup with a 9–2 record behind imports Richie Frahm and Jerald Honeycutt. However, they were upset in the quarterfinals by the 8th-seeded San Miguel Beermen, who overcame TNT's twice-to-beat advantage. In the 2002 Commissioner's Cup Phone Pals reached their first Finals in franchise history led by Honeycutt and Pete Mickeal. In a best-of-seven series against Red Bull Thunder, Talk 'N Text held a 3–2 lead but eventually lost the series in seven games. Following Bayno's departure, Paul Woolpert took over as head coach for the All-Filipino Cup. Though Taulava returned, the team was eliminated in the quarterfinals by the Alaska Aces.

=== 2003–2015: The Jimmy Alapag era ===
==== 2003–2008: Title aspirations and Asi Taulava's later years ====
The 2003 PBA season served as a historic turning point for the Talk 'N Text Phone Pals, resulting in the franchise's first PBA championship and a sweep of major individual honors. The team underwent a strategic reconstruction, eventually elevating Joel Banal to head coach to replace Paul Woolpert. Banal implemented a system focused on disciplined guard play and frontcourt dominance. In the draft, TNT secured Harvey Carey (4th overall) and Jimmy Alapag (10th overall). Alapag, whose draft stock had fallen due to injury, quickly established himself as the team's primary floor general. In the 2003 All-Filipino Cup, Talk 'N Text finished the eliminations with a 10–8 record and advanced to the Finals after defeating the Alaska Aces in a five-game semifinal series. Facing the defending champion Coca-Cola Tigers, the Phone Pals overcame an 0–2 series deficit by winning four consecutive games. On July 13, 2003, they secured a 78–76 victory in Game 6 to claim the franchise's first PBA title. Asi Taulava recorded 25 points in the clincher. During an Invitational Cup game against Batang Red Bull Thunder on August 13, 2003, the team became embroiled in controversy when acting coach Ariel Vanguardia instructed players to score on their own basket to force overtime, seeking a higher quotient for qualification. The PBA fined the team P250,000 and suspended Vanguardia for five games for "making a mockery of the game." Led by import Damian Cantrell, the team reached the semifinals of the Reinforced Conference but was swept by Coca-Cola. They finished in third place after defeating the Sta. Lucia Realtors, 123–106, concluding the season with a franchise-record 32 total wins. At the end of the year, Asi Taulava was named the Most Valuable Player, while Jimmy Alapag earned Rookie of the Year honors.

The season marked the league's transition to a two-conference format. Under head coach Joel Banal, the Phone Pals built a "super-team" around their 2003 championship core of Jimmy Alapag, Asi Taulava, and Harvey Carey. On January 9, 2004, the team acquired Willie Miller from Red Bull Thunder in exchange for two players and a 2005 first-round pick. Miller subsequently signed an P11.4 million contract. The roster was further bolstered by the acquisition of Yancy de Ocampo from FedEx Express, alongside rookie Allan Salangsang and veteran Don Camaso. The season was also overshadowed by a Department of Justice (DOJ) investigation into the citizenship documents of several Filipino-foreign players. Consequently, the PBA placed Asi Taulava under indefinite suspension, forcing the team to play the majority of the Philippine Cup classification round without him.

For the 2004–05 PBA Philippine Cup, Asi Taulava was suspended indefinitely due to citizenship documentation issues. Despite his absence, Talk 'N Text finished the classification round with a 12–6 record and swept the Shell Turbo Chargers, 3–0, in the semifinals. In Game 1 of the Finals against Barangay Ginebra Kings, the team fielded Taulava after securing a court injunction. Although the Phone Pals won the game, Commissioner Noli Eala upheld a protest by Ginebra, resulting in a forfeit—the only time a PBA Finals game result has been reversed. Talk 'N Text eventually lost the series, 2–4. Led by import Jerald Honeycutt, the Phone Pals finished as the #1 seed in the 2005 Fiesta Conference (12–6). They reached their second straight Finals by defeating Shell, 3–1, in the semifinals. Facing the San Miguel Beermen in the Finals, the league officially cleared Taulava to play. However, Talk 'N Text lost the series, 1–4. Despite the defeat, they became the first team under the new format to reach the Finals in both conferences of a single season, and Willie Miller was named Best Player of the Conference.

The 2005–06 PBA season was marked by significant roster turnover, high-profile rookie acquisitions, and a coaching transition from Joel Banal to Derrick Pumaren. In the 2005–06 PBA Fiesta Conference, Talk 'N Text finished the eliminations with a 9–7 record. After winning a seeding playoff against Air21 Express, they secured a direct quarterfinals berth. In the quarterfinals, the Phone Pals replaced import Damien Cantrell with NBA champion Darvin Ham for Game 3. However, they were ultimately eliminated by Air21 in a deciding Game 5, losing 110–117 in overtime. Following the Fiesta Conference, Joel Banal resigned and was replaced by Derrick Pumaren. Ahead of the 2006 Philippine Cup team bolstered its roster by acquiring rookies Mark Cardona and Jay Washington. On May 8, a series of blockbuster trades brought in Ren-Ren Ritualo from Air21 and Don Allado from Alaska, in exchange for Willie Miller, Leo Avenido, and John Ferriols. Despite the star-studded lineup, the team struggled with chemistry, finishing the classification round with a 6–10 record. In the wildcard phase, the Phone Pals failed to win a single game, losing to Ginebra, Air21, and Sta. Lucia Realtors, resulting in their elimination from the tournament.

Prior to the 2006–07 PBA season, the team released Poch Juinio and opted not to renew the contracts of Vergel Meneses and Chris Cantonjos. The Phone Pals participated in the 2006 NBA Summer Pro League and selected Mark Andaya as their lone pick in the 2006 PBA Draft. The campaign served as a turning point for the franchise, with Mark Cardona emerging as a dominant force. Talk 'N Text finished the elimination round of the 2006–07 PBA Philippine Cup with a 10–8 record. In the quarterfinals, they dethroned defending champion Purefoods, 3–1. They advanced to the semifinals to face Barangay Ginebra, taking an early 2–1 series lead. However, the Kings rallied to win the series 4–2. The Phone Pals ultimately finished in third place after defeating Red Bull Barako. In the 2007 PBA Fiesta Conference, the Phone Pals reached the Finals despite the absence of Asi Taulava, Jimmy Alapag, and Renren Ritualo, who were loaned to the national team. To get there, they overcame the Air21 Express in the quarterfinals and upset the top-seeded Red Bull Barako. In the Finals against the Alaska Aces, the series reached a deciding seventh game. Despite strong performances from Best Player of the Conference Mark Cardona, the Aces, led by Willie Miller, won Game 7. A critical late-game steal by Miller off Cardona sealed the victory, resulting in Talk 'N Text's third consecutive Finals defeat.

Despite a star-studded lineup following the 2007 Fiesta Conference, the franchise decided to move in a different direction due to the declining offensive production of Asi Taulava. On November 26, 2007, Taulava was traded to the Coca-Cola Tigers in exchange for Ali Peek and a 2008 first-round draft pick, marking the end of his era with the team. In a pivotal final elimination game, Taulava and the Tigers defeated the Phone Pals to deny them a direct quarterfinal berth. The two teams subsequently met in the first wildcard round, where the Tigers eliminated the 6th-seeded Talk 'N Text. Following the early exit, rumors surfaced regarding the potential dismissal of head coach Derrick Pumaren. However, team management opted to defer any coaching changes until after the 2008 PBA Fiesta Conference.

On January 28, 2008, former San Miguel Beermen head coach Chot Reyes was appointed to lead the franchise, replacing Derrick Pumaren.

==== 2008–2010: The start of the Alapag–Castro–RDO trio ====
Rebranding as the Talk 'N Text Tropang Texters, the team bolstered its roster by drafting Jared Dillinger, Jayson Castro, and Robert Reyes. Led by Mark Cardona, the Texters finished the eliminations of the 2008–09 Philippine Cup in second place with an 11–7 record. They advanced to the Finals after defeating the San Miguel Beermen in six games. In the Finals, Talk 'N Text defeated the Alaska Aces in a seven-game series to claim the championship, with key contributions from Cardona, Jimmy Alapag, and Ranidel de Ocampo. In the following 2009 Fiesta Conference, the team finished the elimination round with a 9–9 record. After defeating Purefoods in the first wildcard phase, the Phone Pals were eliminated in the second wildcard round by the Sta. Lucia Realtors, failing to qualify for the quarterfinals.

The Tropang Texters overhauled their roster during the off-season, acquiring top rookie Japeth Aguilar from the Burger King Whoppers in exchange for four future first-round picks (2010, 2012, 2013, 2014) and cash. Aguilar was subsequently loaned to the Smart Gilas national program. Talk 'N Text failed to defend their title in the 2009–10 Philippine Cup after a controversial quarterfinal series against Barangay Ginebra. In Game 4, the Texters staged a walkout to protest officiating, resulting in a forfeiture and a fine. They ultimately lost the series in a deciding Game 5. The team would then execute a mid-conference blockbuster trade, sending Ali Peek, Nic Belasco, and Pong Escobal to the Sta. Lucia Realtors for Kelly Williams, Ryan Reyes, and Charles Waters. In the 2010 Fiesta Conference. The Texters finished the elimination round in first place with a 15–3 record. However, they were eliminated in the semifinals by the Alaska Aces in a seven-game series.

==== 2010–2013: The Philippine Cup three-peat ====
The early 2010s were defined by the dominance of the Talk 'N Text Tropang Texters, who nearly achieved a Grand Slam during the 2010–11 PBA season. The team secured titles in the 2010–11 PBA Philippine Cup and the 2011 PBA Commissioner's Cup, but ultimately finished as the runner-up in the Governors' Cup.

TNT captured the 2010–11 Philippine Cup championship on February 4, 2011, defeating the San Miguel Beermen in Game 6, 95–82. Jayson Castro and Jimmy Alapag were named co-Finals MVPs for their performances throughout the series. They then continued the momentum by winning the 2011 Commissioner's Cup championship on May 8, 2011, defeating the Barangay Ginebra Kings in a best-of-seven series. The title was secured via a 99–96 overtime victory in Game 6. Jayson Castro and Jimmy Alapag were jointly named Finals MVP. This marked the franchise's fourth championship and the third under head coach Chot Reyes. Aiming for a rare Grand Slam, TNT topped the elimination round of the 2011 Governors' Cup with a 6–2 record and secured a Finals berth after the semifinal round. They faced the Petron Blaze Boosters in a seven-game series. After trailing 3–2, the Texters forced a Game 7 but ultimately fell to Petron, 85–73, ending their Grand Slam bid.

During the 2011–12 PBA season, the Tropang Texters continued their dominance in the All-Filipino conference. Under head coach Chot Reyes, the team maintained a deep, balanced roster as they pursued further championships and established a modern-day dynasty in the league. Talk 'N Text finished the elimination round of the 2011–12 PBA Philippine Cup with a 10–4 record, securing the #2 seed. In the quarterfinals, they utilized their twice-to-beat advantage to eliminate Barako Bull Energy. Following a seven-game semifinal series victory over the Petron Blaze Boosters, the Texters defeated the Powerade Tigers, 4–1, in the Finals. This made them the first team in 27 years to retain the All-Filipino crown. Larry Fonacier was named Finals MVP. Led by import Donnell Harvey, TNT finished the eliminations of the 2012 Commissioner's Cup as the #1 seed (7–2) and advanced to the Finals after defeating Barako Bull in the semifinals. In a seven-game series against the B-Meg Llamados, the Texters lost the deciding Game 7 in overtime, 84–90. In the following Governors' Cup, with the return of import Paul Harris, the team finished the eliminations at 5–4. However, after struggling in the semifinal round-robin, the Texters finished 4th and missed the Finals.

During the 2012–13 PBA season, the franchise became the first in 30 years to win the Philippine Cup for three consecutive seasons. This season also marked a coaching transition, as Norman Black replaced Chot Reyes, who departed to coach the national team. In the 2012–13 PBA Philippine Cup, Talk 'N Text finished the elimination round with a league-best 12–2 record, securing the top seed. In the playoffs, they eliminated the Air21 Express in the quarterfinals and defeated the Alaska Aces, 4–2, in the semifinals. The Texters achieved a historic milestone by sweeping the Rain or Shine Elasto Painters, 4–0, in the Finals to win their third consecutive Philippine Cup. This feat granted the franchise permanent possession of the Jun Bernardino Trophy, making them the first to do so in league history. Ranidel de Ocampo was named Finals MVP, while Jayson Castro earned the Best Player of the Conference award.

==== 2013–2015: Jimmy Alapag's later years and departure ====
Reinforced by imports Jerome Jordan and later Tony Mitchell, the Texters finished the eliminations of the 2013 Commissioner's Cup with a 7–7 record. In the semifinals, they faced Barangay Ginebra San Miguel. Despite Mitchell scoring 45 points in Game 4 to force a decider, the Texters lost the series, 2–3, after a 101–111 defeat in Game 5. Hampered by the exhaustion of core Gilas Pilipinas players following the 2013 FIBA Asia Championship, TNT finished the eliminations of the Governors' Cup with a 3–6 record under import Courtney Fells. The team fell into a tie for the final playoff spot but was eliminated by Barangay Ginebra, 102–110, in a knockout playoff, marking their first missed quarterfinals in years.

In the 2013–14 Philippine Cup, the Tropang Texters qualified for the playoffs with an 8–6 record but were eliminated by the San Mig Coffee Mixers in the quarterfinals. Prior to the postseason, TNT acquired Niño Canaleta from Air21 in exchange for Sean Anthony, rookie Eliud Poligrates, and a 2016 first-round pick. In the following 2014 Commissioner's Cup, TNT finished the elimination round undefeated (9–0) and extended their streak to 13–0 after defeating Barangay Ginebra San Miguel in the quarterfinals and sweeping Rain or Shine Elasto Painters in the semifinals. This made them the first team in 34 years to enter the Finals undefeated. Import Richard Howell recorded a career-high 30 rebounds during the conference. In the Finals, TNT faced the San Mig Super Coffee Mixers, losing the series 3–1. Howell was named Best Import, while Jayson Castro earned the Best Player award. In the season-ending 2014 Governors' Cup, the Texters topped the elimination round with a 7–2 record and advanced to the semifinals after defeating Barako Bull Energy in the quarterfinals. Facing the San Mig Super Coffee Mixers in a best-of-five series, TNT recovered from a 0–2 deficit to force a Game 5 but ultimately lost the series, 3–2. Despite the exit, import Paul Harris was lauded for his performance.

On September 18, 2014, the Texters began reloading their roster by acquiring Robert Labagala from Barako Bull Energy, reuniting him with coach Jong Uichico. On September 22, the franchise executed a series of multi-team trades to acquire Jay Washington, rookie Matt Ganuelas, and Kevin Alas. To facilitate these moves, TNT traded Nonoy Baclao to GlobalPort Batang Pier, Harold Arboleda to NLEX Road Warriors, and KG Canaleta to NLEX, while also dealing future first and second-round draft picks. TNT opened the 2014–15 PBA Philippine Cup on October 19, 2014, with an 81–101 loss to Barangay Ginebra San Miguel. The Texters recovered to finish the elimination round with an 8–3 record, securing a twice-to-beat advantage after defeating the San Miguel Beermen, 107–101, in their final game. In the quarterfinals, TNT advanced by defeating Barako Bull Energy (105–76) and Barangay Ginebra (83–67) in a knockout match. However, the team was swept 4–0 in the best-of-seven semifinals by the San Miguel Beermen, who capitalized on TNT's lack of a legitimate center.

On January 9, 2015, long-time team captain Jimmy Alapag officially announced his retirement prior to Game 2 of the Philippine Cup Finals. He immediately transitioned into a new role as the franchise's team manager.

=== 2015–2020: The post-Alapag era ===
==== 2015–2017: Ranidel de Ocampo's later years and a series of rebrands ====
As the new team manager, Jimmy Alapag brought back Richard Howell for the 2015 PBA Commissioner's Cup. The team also signed veteran Willie Miller, who returned to the franchise on January 25, 2015. Mid-conference, Howell was replaced by former Atlanta Hawk Ivan Johnson. TNT finished the elimination round with an 8–3 record, earning a twice-to-beat advantage. In the playoffs, the Texters eliminated Barako Bull Energy in the quarterfinals and dethroned the Purefoods Star Hotshots, 3–1, in the semifinals. In the Finals, TNT defeated the Rain or Shine Elasto Painters in a seven-game series, clinching the title with a 121–118 double-overtime victory in Game 7. Jayson Castro was named Best Player of the Conference, while Ranidel de Ocampo earned Finals MVP honors. For the final conference of the season, the Governors' Cup, TNT signed Steffphon Pettigrew and Asian import Sam Daghles. However, the Texters failed to reach the playoffs, finishing tenth with a 5–6 record.

The 2015–16 season saw the team use three different names, one for each conference: TNT Tropang Texters for the Philippine Cup, Tropang TNT (logo shown) for the Commissioner's Cup, and TNT KaTropa for the Governors' Cup. The KaTropa name would end up sticking for the rest of the 2010s.

The 2015–16 PBA season was a period of transition for the franchise, marked by a significant infusion of youth and multiple identity changes to align with the rebranding of Smart Communications. On August 23, 2015, TNT selected Moala Tautuaa as the 1st overall pick and acquired Troy Rosario as the 2nd overall pick through a three-team trade. To facilitate this youth movement, the team traded franchise icon Jimmy Alapag to Meralco in a three-team deal prior to the draft. In the 2015–16 Philippine Cup, the team officially competed as the TNT Tropang Texters. They finished the elimination round as the sixth seed with a 6–5 record, hampered by the loss of Ranidel de Ocampo, who was sidelined by a severe herniated disc. In the playoffs, TNT eliminated the NLEX Road Warriors in the first phase of the quarterfinals. However, they were eliminated in Phase 2 by the Rain or Shine Elasto Painters, 104–89. For the 2016 Commissioner's Cup, the team rebranded as Tropang TNT and brought back import Ivan Johnson. The conference was overshadowed by a controversy on February 13, 2016, when Johnson was ejected and directed profanities at PBA Commissioner Chito Narvasa. This resulted in an initial lifetime ban, which was later downgraded to a season-long suspension and a ₱150,000 fine following an apology. TNT signed David Simon as a replacement and reached the playoffs. However, they were eliminated in the quarterfinals by the Alaska Aces in a deciding Game 3, losing 85–81. The franchise adopted the name TNT KaTropa starting in the 2016 Governors' Cup, a moniker it maintained until the 2019 Governors' Cup. Led by Jayson Castro, TNT dominated the elimination round with a league-best 10–1 record. However, the team was eliminated in the semifinals by the Meralco Bolts. In Game 4, Meralco secured a 94–88 victory to oust the top-seeded KaTropa. The series was notable for former TNT legend Jimmy Alapag leading Meralco to its first-ever PBA Finals appearance at the expense of his former franchise.

The 2016–17 PBA season marked a pivotal coaching transition for TNT KaTropa. On October 22, 2016, Nash Racela was appointed head coach, replacing Jong Uichico. Racela implemented a modern, guard-oriented offensive system similar to his successful tenure with the FEU Tamaraws. TNT bolstered its roster by selecting Roger Pogoy via the Gilas Pilipinas special draft. The KaTropa finished the elimination round with a 6–5 record to secure the 4th seed of the 2016–17 Philippine Cup. After sweeping the GlobalPort Batang Pier in the quarterfinals, TNT pushed the San Miguel Beermen to seven games in the semifinals. Despite a strong performance from Jayson Castro, the team fell in Game 7, 96–83, as the Beermen's size advantage proved decisive. Ahead of the 2017 Commissioner's Cup, TNT recruited 6'10" center Joshua Smith and acquired guard RR Garcia from San Miguel in exchange for Matt Ganuelas-Rosser. The team finished the elimination round with an 8–3 record, subsequently defeating Meralco in the quarterfinals and Barangay Ginebra in the semifinals to reach the Finals. In the Finals against San Miguel Beermen, TNT won Game 1 behind a 27-point performance from rookie Roger Pogoy. However, a foot injury to Smith hindered the team in the later stages of the series. The Beermen eventually captured the title in six games, concluding with a 115–91 victory in Game 6. TNT finished the elimination round of the season-ending 2017 Governors' Cup as the 2nd seed with an 8–3 record, led by import Glen Rice Jr. Rice provided elite scoring but struggled with disciplinary issues throughout the conference. The KaTropa were eliminated in the semifinals by Barangay Ginebra. The physical series concluded in Game 4 with a 115–105 loss, during which Rice was ejected for an altercation with Kevin Ferrer. Despite the exit, Roger Pogoy was named the 2016–17 PBA Rookie of the Year, establishing himself as a cornerstone of the franchise.

==== 2017–2020: A period of transition ====
The 2017–18 PBA season was a transitional period for TNT KaTropa, characterized by youth recruitment and strategic veteran acquisitions to bolster the roster under head coach Nash Racela. TNT engaged in multiple trades to overhaul its wing and interior rotations. On February 15, 2018, the team acquired Jericho Cruz from the Rain or Shine Elasto Painters in exchange for Sidney Onwubere, Kris Rosales, and a 2018 first-round pick. Shortly after, TNT added wing Don Trollano from Rain or Shine in exchange for big man Norbert Torres, reuniting former Adamson University teammates Cruz and Trollano. TNT struggled throughout the elimination round of the 2017–18 Philippine Cup, finishing with a 5–6 record. This necessitated a knockout 8th-seed playoff against the Phoenix Fuelmasters, which TNT won, 118–97, on March 4, 2018, to secure a postseason berth. In the quarterfinals, TNT faced the top-seeded San Miguel Beermen with a twice-to-beat disadvantage and was eliminated following a 106–93 loss on March 6, 2018. On April 3, 2018, TNT executed a major trade to acquire three-time scoring champion Terrence Romeo and Yousef Taha from the GlobalPort Batang Pier. In exchange, TNT sent 2015 top pick Moala Tautuaa, a 2020 first-round pick, and a 2021 second-round pick to GlobalPort. Despite the addition of Romeo, TNT's promising 8–3 elimination record in the 2018 PBA Commissioner's Cup did not translate to postseason success. The team was swept, 0–2, in the quarterfinals by the San Miguel Beermen, ending the first conference of the Romeo-Castro backcourt pairing early. Following a 1–4 start in the 2018 Governors' Cup, head coach Nash Racela was replaced by Bong Ravena, with Mark Dickel appointed as an active consultant. Despite recruiting import Marqus Blakely, TNT finished with a 4–7 record and missed the playoffs for the first time in several years. In December 2018, the franchise traded Terrence Romeo to San Miguel to address internal chemistry issues.

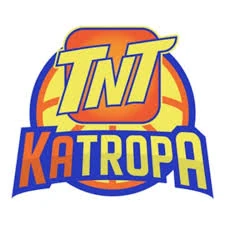
TNT KaTropa logo used from 2019–2020

The 2019 PBA season was a transitional year for TNT KaTropa, characterized by a shift toward a high-octane offense. Under head coach Bong Ravena and consultant Mark Dickel, the team returned to championship contention and executed a major roster overhaul via the acquisition of rookie star Bobby Ray Parks Jr. In the 2019 PBA Draft, TNT selected defensive guard Kib Montalbo in the first round (11th overall) and Simon Camacho in the third round. On November 3, 2019, TNT acquired Bobby Ray Parks Jr. from Blackwater Elite in exchange for Don Trollano, Anthony Semerad, and a 2021 first-round pick. Other notable acquisitions included sharpshooter Michael DiGregorio for Brian Heruela and the signing of free agent Almond Vosotros. TNT finished the elimination round of the 2019 Philippine Cup with a 7–4 record but was eliminated in the quarterfinals by the San Miguel Beermen, losing the best-of-three series 1–2. Behind the dominance of former NBA forward Terrence Jones, TNT topped the eliminations of the Commissioner's Cup with a 10–1 record. They swept the Alaska Aces in the quarterfinals and defeated Barangay Ginebra (3–1) in the semifinals. In the Finals, TNT fell to San Miguel, 2–4, despite holding an early series lead. Jayson Castro and Jones were named Best Player and Best Import of the conference, respectively. For the Governors' Cup TNT signed KJ McDaniels as their import, leading the team to an 8–3 record and the third seed. On November 3, 2019, TNT acquired rookie Ray Parks Jr. from Blackwater in exchange for Don Trollano and Anthony Semerad. In the playoffs, TNT utilized their twice-to-beat advantage to eliminate Magnolia in the quarterfinals. However, they were eliminated in the semifinals by the Meralco Bolts, losing the best-of-five series, 3–2, after a 89–78 defeat in Game 5.

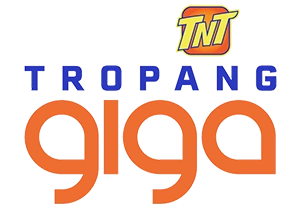
TNT Tropang GIGA logo used from 2020–2022

For the 2020 PBA season, the team rebranded to TNT Tropang Giga. To strengthen their frontcourt, TNT acquired 6-foot-8 center Poy Erram through a three-team trade involving NLEX and Blackwater, sending Anthony Semerad and two future first-round picks in exchange. The team also signed free agent Lervyn Flores to bolster interior depth. In the lone conference of the season, the 2020 Philippine Cup, TNT finished the elimination round with a 7–4 record, securing the third seed. In the quarterfinals, they eliminated the Alaska Aces, 104–83. They advanced to the Finals after overcoming a 1–2 deficit against the Phoenix Super LPG Fuel Masters in the semifinals, winning the series 3–2. In the Finals, TNT faced Barangay Ginebra San Miguel. Hampered by injuries to Ray Parks Jr. (calf) and Jayson Castro (knee), the Tropang Giga fell in five games, 1–4.

=== 2021–present: New talents emerge ===
==== 2021–2023: The Mikey Williams era and the arrival of Calvin Oftana ====
Ahead of the 2021 PBA season, the franchise underwent a major leadership change by rehiring Chot Reyes as head coach for the first time since 2012. To bolster the roster, TNT participated in a three-team trade with the NLEX Road Warriors and Blackwater Elite to acquire the 4th overall pick, which they used to select Fil-Am guard Mikey Williams. Additionally, veteran Kelly Williams returned from a brief retirement to provide frontcourt leadership. TNT dominated the 2021 PBA Philippine Cup, finishing the elimination round as the top seed with a 10–1 record. In the quarterfinals, the team utilized its twice-to-beat advantage to eliminate defending champion Barangay Ginebra San Miguel, 84–71. TNT advanced to the Finals after a grueling seven-game semifinal series against the San Miguel Beermen, winning the deciding Game 7, 97–79. In the Finals, TNT defeated the Magnolia Pambansang Manok Hotshots, 4–1, in Bacolor, Pampanga. The series was highlighted by a record-breaking Game 2 performance and a 39-point outburst from Mikey Williams in Game 3. Williams was named Finals MVP, becoming the first rookie since 2003 to earn the honor. TNT finished the elimination round of the 2021 Governors' Cup as the 3rd seed with a 7–4 record, parading imports McKenzie Moore and later Aaron Fuller. Despite holding a twice-to-beat advantage in the quarterfinals, TNT was upset by Barangay Ginebra in back-to-back games, resulting in an early exit.

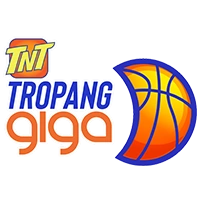
TNT Tropang Giga logo used from 2022–2025

TNT entered the 2022 PBA Philippine Cup as the defending Philippine Cup champion, finishing the elimination round as the second seed with an 8–3 record. The team advanced through the playoffs by defeating the Converge FiberXers in the quarterfinals and the Magnolia Chicken Timplados Hotshots (4–2) in the semifinals. In the Finals, TNT faced the San Miguel Beermen in a seven-game series. Despite a Game 1 buzzer-beater by Jayson Castro and holding a 3–2 series lead, TNT suffered a late-game collapse in Game 7, losing 119–97 and failing to secure back-to-back titles. On September 19, 2022, TNT engaged in a blockbuster three-team trade to revitalize the roster. The team acquired rising star Calvin Oftana and Raul Soyud from the NLEX Road Warriors. In exchange, TNT sent veteran mainstay Troy Rosario and Gab Banal to Blackwater Bossing, ending Rosario's seven-year tenure with the franchise. For the 2022–23 Commissioner's Cup, TNT signed Cameron Oliver as the team's import. TNT struggled with consistency and injuries, finishing with a 4–8 record. For the first time in several seasons, the franchise failed to qualify for the playoffs. The 2023 Governors' Cup featured a coaching shift as Jojo Lastimosa took over as interim head coach while Chot Reyes focused on national team duties. A pivotal mid-conference move saw TNT replace Jalen Hudson with Rondae Hollis-Jefferson, a change that transformed the team's defensive identity. TNT finished the elimination round as the top seed with a 10–1 record. In the quarterfinals, TNT utilized its twice-to-beat advantage to eliminate the Phoenix Super LPG Fuel Masters, 132–105. Hollis-Jefferson recorded a triple-double, and the team set a franchise playoff record with 21 three-pointers. TNT then advanced to the Finals by defeating the Meralco Bolts, 3–1, in a physical semifinal series highlighted by a 40-point Game 3 performance from Hollis-Jefferson. In the Finals, TNT faced defending champion Barangay Ginebra San Miguel. TNT secured the title, 4–2, following a 97–93 victory in Game 6 behind Mikey Williams' 38 points. Williams was named Finals MVP, while Hollis-Jefferson earned the Best Import award. This series is often cited as the starting point of the TNT-Barangay Ginebra rivalry.

==== 2023–present: The Calvin Oftana era ====
During the 2023–24 PBA season, TNT represented the PBA in the first regular season of the East Asia Super League (EASL) alongside the Meralco Bolts. The team opened its campaign on October 11, 2023, with a 93–75 loss to the Chiba Jets in Japan. TNT played the tournament without several key players, including Mikey Williams, Roger Pogoy, and Poy Erram, and ultimately failed to advance to the EASL Final Four.

With Chot Reyes on leave following his national team stint, Jojo Lastimosa served as head coach for the 2023–24 PBA Commissioner's Cup. The team initially paraded Rondae Hollis-Jefferson, but a neck injury led the team to sign his brother, Rahlir Hollis-Jefferson, as a replacement. TNT finished the elimination round as the 8th seed with a 5–6 record, securing the final playoff spot after a crucial win against the Phoenix Fuelmasters. In the quarterfinals, TNT faced the top-seeded Magnolia Chicken Timplados Hotshots with a twice-to-win disadvantage and was eliminated in a single game, 109–94, on January 17, 2024. On January 20, 2024, the franchise announced the return of Chot Reyes as head coach for the 2024 Philippine Cup, while Jojo Lastimosa transitioned back to team manager. The team finished the elimination round with a 6–5 record, securing the 4th seed. In the quarterfinals, TNT faced the Rain or Shine Elasto Painters in a best-of-three series. Despite winning the opening game, TNT lost the following two matches, resulting in a 1–2 series defeat and a rare early playoff exit.

The 2024–25 PBA season was a historic campaign where the franchise reached the Finals in all three conferences. The team established a defensive identity under head coach Chot Reyes and returning import Rondae Hollis-Jefferson. In the 2024 Governors' Cup, TNT topped Group A with an 8–2 record during the elimination round. They advanced through the playoffs by defeating the NLEX Road Warriors (3–1) in the quarterfinals and the Rain or Shine Elasto Painters (4–1) in the semifinals. In the Finals, TNT defeated Barangay Ginebra, 4–2, to retain their title. Jayson Castro was named Finals MVP, while Hollis-Jefferson earned the Best Import award. TNT secured the second seed of the 2024–25 Commissioner's Cup with a 9–2 record in the elimination round, with Rondae Hollis-Jefferson returning as import. In the quarterfinals, TNT utilized its twice-to-beat advantage to eliminate the NorthPort Batang Pier, 105–92, behind a strong performance from Rey Nambatac. The team then advanced to the Finals after defeating the Rain or Shine Elasto Painters, 4–1, in the semifinals, highlighted by the perimeter shooting of Calvin Oftana. The Finals featured a seven-game rematch against Barangay Ginebra. TNT claimed the championship with an 87–83 overtime victory in Game 7. Rey Nambatac was named Finals MVP, while Rondae Hollis-Jefferson received his third Best Import of the Conference award. On April 3, 2025, ahead of the 2025 Philippine Cup, the franchise officially rebranded as TNT Tropang 5G. To strengthen the roster, TNT acquired Jordan Heading from the Converge FiberXers on June 2, 2025, in exchange for the rights to Mikey Williams, resolving a long-standing contract dispute. The team finished the elimination round with a 6–5 record (6th place). In the playoffs, TNT defeated the NLEX Road Warriors, 2–1, in the quarterfinals and overcame Rain or Shine, 4–2, in the semifinals. This victory marked a historic milestone as TNT became the first team to eliminate the same opponent in the semifinals of all three conferences in a single season. In the Finals, a shorthanded TNT squad—hampered by injuries and the absence of Rey Nambatac—lost to the San Miguel Beermen, 2–4, ending their bid for a rare Grand Slam on July 25, 2025.

Coming off a year of three Finals appearances, TNT Tropang 5G reinforced their roster for the 2025–26 season by signing free agents Kevin Ferrer, Tyrus Hill, and Jio Jalalon to provide veteran depth and defensive versatility. Before the season began, TNT participated in the 2025 Abu Dhabi International Basketball Championship from September 29 to October 5, 2025, as an "all-Filipino" squad. The team finished the group stage with a 1–2 record, securing a win against Al Dhafra (98–76) but falling to Al Sharjah and eventual champion Al Riyadi (94–53). Upon their return, the PBA sanctioned the franchise for participating without formal league clearance. In the 2025–26 Philippine Cup, TNT finished the elimination round as the 3rd seed with an 8–3 record, led by the playmaking of Jordan Heading and Calvin Oftana. A key highlight included Kelly Williams hitting a career-high eight triples in an overtime victory against Terrafirma. In the quarterfinals, TNT utilized its twice-to-beat advantage to eliminate the Magnolia Chicken Timplados Hotshots in a single game, 118–109. The team advanced to its fourth consecutive Finals after defeating the Meralco Bolts, 4–1, in the semifinals. The series concluded with a 99–96 Game 5 victory, sealed by a crucial four-pointer from Rey Nambatac and a go-ahead layup by Heading. In the Finals, TNT faced the San Miguel Beermen in a rematch. Despite winning Game 1 and rebounding to take Game 4, TNT lost the series 2–4 as San Miguel successfully defended the All-Filipino title.

TNT's plans for the 2026 Commissioner's Cup were altered following the Achilles injury to Rondae Hollis-Jefferson during his stint in the EASL. In April 2025, Rondae Hollis-Jefferson signed 1-year "exclusive" contract with TNT. Just to give the 3-time Best Import awardee a long well-deserved rest. TNT allowed Hollis-Jefferson to play for Meralco Bolts for the EASL season. On February 8, 2026, It was reported that Bol Bol was expected to sign with the team within two days which will be his first game outside the NBA. On February 19, 2026, Bol arrived in Manila to play for the upcoming 2026 PBA Commissioners Cup making him officially part of the team.

== Current roster ==
TNT Tropang 5G roster
Players
Coaches

Pos.	#	POB	Name	Height	Weight	DOB (YYYY–MM–DD)	From
G	0	(United States)	Simon Enciso	5 ft 11 in (1.80 m)	185 lb (84 kg)	1991–02–12	Notre Dame de Namur
F	2	(United States)	Tyrus Hill	6 ft 5 in (1.96 m)	185 lb (84 kg)	1996–03–20	De La Salle
F	5	(Philippines)	Joe Celzo (R)	6 ft 4 in (1.93 m)		2000–04–25	San Beda
G	6	(Philippines)	Rey Nambatac	5 ft 11 in (1.80 m)		1994–01–27	Letran
C	7	(Philippines)	Poy Erram	6 ft 8 in (2.03 m)	227 lb (103 kg)	1989–07–07	Ateneo
F	8	(Philippines)	Calvin Oftana (injured)	6 ft 5 in (1.96 m)	196 lb (89 kg)	1996–01–03	San Beda
F	9	(United States)	Paul Varilla	6 ft 3 in (1.91 m)		1993–08–10	UE
F	12	(Philippines)	Glenn Khobuntin	6 ft 4 in (1.93 m)	195 lb (88 kg)	1991–09–07	National-U
F	14	(Philippines)	Mike Nieto (FA)	6 ft 2 in (1.88 m)	200 lb (91 kg)	1997–05–31	Ateneo
G	15	(Australia)	Jordan Heading	6 ft 2 in (1.88 m)	189 lb (86 kg)	1996–01–30	Cal Baptist
G/F	16	(Philippines)	Roger Pogoy (C)	6 ft 2 in (1.88 m)	180 lb (82 kg)	1992–06–16	Far Eastern
G	17	(Philippines)	Jayson Castro (injured) (FA)	5 ft 10 in (1.78 m)	185 lb (84 kg)	1986–06–30	Philippine Christian
F/C	21	(United States)	Kelly Williams (FA)	6 ft 7 in (2.01 m)	215 lb (98 kg)	1982–02–07	Oakland
F	24	(United States)	Rondae Hollis-Jefferson (GI)	6 ft 6 in (1.98 m)	217 lb (98 kg)	1995–01–03	Arizona
G	27	(Canada)	Avan Nava (FA)	6 ft 2 in (1.88 m)	180 lb (82 kg)	2000–04–04	St. Francis Xavier
G	28	(Philippines)	Jio Jalalon	5 ft 9 in (1.75 m)	150 lb (68 kg)	1992–08–02	Arellano
G	30	(Philippines)	Sean Quitevis (R)	6 ft 1 in (1.85 m)		1999–09–30	Ateneo
F/C	32	(United States)	Henry Galinato	6 ft 6 in (1.98 m)	245 lb (111 kg)	1997–09–09	Philippines
G/F	35	(Philippines)	Kim Aurin	6 ft 1 in (1.85 m)	190 lb (86 kg)	1997–02–05	UPHSD
F/C	45	(United States)	Brandon Ganuelas-Rosser	6 ft 6 in (1.98 m)	220 lb (100 kg)	1994–06–29	UC Riverside
F/C	60	(Philippines)	Jeo Ambohot	6 ft 7 in (2.01 m)	193 lb (88 kg)	1996–11–18	Letran
F	77	(Philippines)	Kevin Ferrer	6 ft 5 in (1.96 m)	188 lb (85 kg)	1993–03–26	UST

Head coach

- (Philippines) Chot Reyes

Assistant coach(es)

- (Philippines) Josh Reyes (1st assistant)
- (Philippines) Sandy Arespacochaga
- (Philippines) Ranidel de Ocampo
- (Philippines) Yuri Escueta
- (Philippines) Ryan Reyes
- (Philippines) Bong Ravena

Team manager

- (Philippines) Jojo Lastimosa
- (Philippines) Yvette Ruiz (assistant)

Legend

- (C) Team captain
- (CI) Commissioner's Cup Import
- (GI) Governors' Cup Import
- (EI) EASL Import
- (DP) Unsigned draft pick
- (FA) Free agent
- (IN) Inactive
- (S) Suspended
- (R) Rookie
- Injured

Roster

== Season-by-season records ==
List of the last five conferences completed by the TNT franchise. For the full-season history, see List of TNT Tropang 5G seasons.

Note: GP = Games played, W = Wins, L = Losses, W–L% = Winning percentage

Season	Conference	GP	W	L	W–L%	Finish	Playoffs
2024–25	Governors'	10	8	2	.800	1st (Group A)	PBA champions, won vs. Barangay Ginebra, 4–2
2024–25	Commissioner's	12	8	4	.667	2nd	PBA champions, won vs. Barangay Ginebra, 4–3
2024–25	Philippine	11	6	5	.545	6th	Lost in finals vs. San Miguel, 2–4
2025–26	Philippine	11	8	3	.727	3rd	Lost in finals vs. San Miguel, 2–4
2025–26	Commissioner's	12	6	6	.500	8th	Lost in finals vs. Barangay Ginebra, 3–4
An asterisk (*) indicates one-game playoff; two asterisks (**) indicates team with twice-to-beat advantage

== Awards ==
=== Individual awards ===
PBA Most Valuable Player	Finals MVP	PBA Best Player of the Conference
Asi Taulava – 2003; Jimmy Alapag – 2010–11	Asi Taulava – 2003 All-Filipino; Mark Cardona – 2008–09 Philippine; Jimmy Alapag – 2010–11 Philippine, 2010–11 Commissioner's; Jayson Castro – 2010–11 Philippine, 2010–11 Commissioner's, 2024 Governors'; Larry Fonacier – 2011–12 Philippine; Ranidel de Ocampo – 2012–13 Philippine, 2014–15 Commissioner's; Mikey Williams – 2021 Philippine, 2023 Governors'; Rey Nambatac – 2024–25 Commissioner's	Asi Taulava – 2003 All-Filipino; Willie Miller – 2004–05 Fiesta; Mark Cardona – 2006–07 Fiesta; Jimmy Alapag – 2010–11 Commissioner's; Jayson Castro – 2012–13 Philippine, 2013–14 Commissioner's, 2014–15 Commissioner's, 2015–16 Governors', 2019 Commissioner's; Ranidel de Ocampo – 2013–14 Governors'
PBA Rookie of the Year Award	PBA All-Defensive Team	PBA Mythical First Team
Andy Seigle – 1997; Jimmy Alapag – 2003; Roger Pogoy – 2016–17; Mikey Williams – 2021	Glenn Capacio – 1998; Patrick Fran – 1998, 2001, 2003; Asi Taulava – 2003; Harvey Carey – 2006–07; Ryan Reyes – 2009–12; Kelly Williams – 2021; Glenn Khobuntin – 2024–25	Jeffrey Cariaso – 1999; Victor Pablo – 2002; Jimmy Alapag – 2003, 2004–05, 2010–11; Asi Taulava – 2003; Willie Miller – 2004–05; Jay Washington – 2006–07; Mark Cardona – 2008–09; Kelly Williams – 2010–11; Ranidel de Ocampo – 2011–14; Jayson Castro – 2012–16, 2019; Poy Erram – 2020; Mikey Williams – 2021; Calvin Oftana – 2024–25
PBA Mythical Second Team	PBA Most Improved Player	PBA Sportsmanship Award
Asi Taulava – 2002; Gilbert Demape – 2002; Harvey Carey – 2003; Mark Telan – 2004–05; Mark Cardona – 2006–07, 2009–10; Yancy de Ocampo – 2006–07; Kelly Williams – 2009–10, 2011–12, 2016–17; Jayson Castro – 2010–12, 2016–17; Ali Peek – 2010–11; Ranidel de Ocampo – 2014–15; Roger Pogoy – 2019, 2024–25; Troy Rosario – 2019; Mikey Williams – 2022–23; Calvin Oftana – 2022–24	Patrick Fran – 1998; Jayson Castro – 2010–11	Patrick Fran – 2003; Ali Peek – 2007–08
PBA Best Import		
Ronnie Coleman – 1994 Governors'; Silas Mills – 1998 Governors'; Jerald Honeycutt – 2002 Commissioner's, 2004–05 Fiesta; Richard Howell – 2013–14 Commissioner's; Terrence Jones – 2019 Commissioner's; Rondae Hollis-Jefferson – 2023 Governors', 2024 Governors', 2024–25 Commissioner's		

=== PBA Press Corps Individual Awards ===
Executive of the Year	Baby Dalupan Coach of the Year	Defensive Player of the Year
Manny Pangilinan – 2003, 2010–11, 2024–25; Ricky Vargas – 2006–07, 2019; Patrick Gregorio – 2014–15; Jojo Lastimosa – 2022–23	Chot Reyes – 2008–09, 2010–11, 2021, 2024–25	
Bogs Adornado Comeback Player of the Year	Mr. Quality Minutes	All-Rookie Team
Glenn Capacio – 1998; Kelly Williams – 2009–10, 2016–17; Brandon Ganuelas-Rosser – 2024–25	Jayson Castro – 2008–09, 2010–11; Larry Fonacier – 2011–12	Jared Dillinger – 2008–09; Matt Ganuelas-Rosser – 2014–15; Troy Rosario – 2015–16; Roger Pogoy – 2016–17; Bobby Ray Parks Jr. – 2019; Mikey Williams – 2021; Jordan Heading – 2024–25

=== All-Star Weekend ===
All Star MVP	Obstacle Challenge	Three-point Shootout
Asi Taulava & Jimmy Alapag – 2004; Asi Taulava – 2006; Troy Rosario – 2017 Mindanao; Terrence Romeo – 2018 Luzon	Tonyboy Espinosa – 1997–1998; Willie Miller – 2006; Dave Marcelo – 2023	Jimmy Alapag – 2003, 2005; Renren Ritualo – 2008; Calvin Oftana – 2024
Slam Dunk Contest	All Star Selection	
Victor Pablo – 1994; Don Camaso – 2000; Kelly Williams – 2011	1991: Manny Victorino; 1992: Abet Guidaben; Manny Victorino; 1993: Abet Guidaben; Victor Pablo; 1994: Boy Cabahug; Victor Pablo; Dindo Pumaren; 1995: Dwight Lago; Dindo Pumaren; Alvin Teng; 1997: Jeffrey Cariaso; Andy Seigle; 1999: Jeffrey Cariaso; Jerry Codiñera; Patrick Fran; Asi Taulava; 2000: Gherome Ejercito; 2001: Gherome Ejercito; Asi Taulava; 2003: Jimmy Alapag; Asi Taulava; 2004: Jimmy Alapag; Willie Miller; Asi Taulava; 2005: Jimmy Alapag; Asi Taulava; 2006: Jimmy Alapag; Asi Taulava; 2007: Jimmy Alapag; Asi Taulava; Mark Cardona; 2008: Jimmy Alapag; Mark Cardona; 2009: Jimmy Alapag; Mark Cardona; Ranidel de Ocampo; Jared Dillinger; Tiras Wade (import); 2010: Jimmy Alapag; Mark Cardona; Ranidel de Ocampo; Ryan Reyes; Kelly Williams; 2011: Jimmy Alapag; Harvey Carey; Ranidel de Ocampo; Kelly Williams; 2013: Jimmy Alapag – did not play; Jayson Castro; Ranidel de Ocampo; Larry Fonacier; 2014: Jimmy Alapag; Jayson Castro; KG Canaleta; Ranidel de Ocampo; Larry Fonacier; 2015: Jimmy Alapag; Jayson Castro; Ranidel de Ocampo; 2016: Jayson Castro; Ranidel de Ocampo; Troy Rosario; 2017: Jayson Castro; Ranidel de Ocampo; RR Pogoy; Troy Rosario; Moala Tautuaa; 2018: Jayson Castro; Jericho Cruz; RR Garcia; RR Pogoy; Terrence Romeo; Troy Rosario; 2019: Jayson Castro; RR Pogoy; Troy Rosario; 2023: Jayson Castro; Calvin Oftana; RR Pogoy; Mikey Williams; 2024: Jayson Castro; Calvin Oftana; RR Pogoy; 2026: Rey Nambatac; Calvin Oftana; RR Pogoy	

== Notable players ==
=== Members of the PBA's 40 greatest players ===
- Jerry Codiñera – played for Mobiline from 1999 to 2001
- Alberto Guidaben – played for Pepsi/7-Up from 1990 to 1993
- Vergel Meneses – played for Talk 'N Text on 2006
- Willie Miller – played for Talk 'N Text from 2004 to 2006 season and then return at 2015 Commissioners Cup
- Asi Taulava – played for Talk 'N Text Phone Pals from 1999 to 2007
- Kelly Williams – played for Talk 'N Text from 2010 to present
- Jimmy Alapag – played for Talk 'N Text from 2003 to 2015
- Jayson Castro – played for Talk 'N Text from 2008 to present

=== Retired numbers ===
TNT Tropang 5G retired number
N°	Player	Position	Tenure
3	Jimmy Alapag	PG	2003–2015^{[a]}
4	Harvey Carey	PF/SF	2003–2020^{[b]}
33	Ranidel de Ocampo	PF/SF	2008–2017^{[c]}

- ^{a} – The Talk 'N Text Tropang Texters retired the jersey number of Jimmy Alapag during the 2015 PBA All-Star Weekend, where he was added as the 13th man of the South All-Stars.
- ^{b} – The TNT Tropang Giga retired the jersey number of Harvey Carey on June 28, 2023, during a preseason "PBA on Tour" game.
- ^{c} –The TNT Tropang 5G retired the jersey number of Ranidel de Ocampo on January 9, 2026, during the Game 3 of the semifinals of 2025–26 PBA Philippine Cup.

== Head coaches ==
Name	Start	End	Seasons	Overall record				Best finish
Name	Start	End	Seasons	W	L	PCT	G	Best finish
Ed Ocampo	1990	1991	2	9	43	.173	52	Eliminations
Derrick Pumaren	1991	1993	3	47	50	.484	97	Finals
Yeng Guiao	1995	1996	2	14	51	.215	65	Semifinals
Tommy Manotoc	1997	1998	2	16	22	.421	38	Semifinals
Eric Altamirano	1998	2000	3	50	51	.495	101	Champions
Louie Alas	2000	2001	2	27	30	.473	57	Semifinals
Bill Bayno	2002	2002	1	22	15	.594	37	Finals
Paul Woolpert	2002	2002	1	5	5	.500	10	Quarterfinals
Joel Banal	2003	2005	3	80	54	.597	134	Champions
Derrick Pumaren	1993	1994	2	31	36	.462	67	Semifinals
Derrick Pumaren	1997	1997	1	4	6	.400	10	Eliminations
Derrick Pumaren	2005	2008	4	73	70	.510	143	Finals
Chot Reyes	2008	2012	5	145	77	.653	222	Champions
Norman Black	1997	1997	1	9	13	.409	22	Semifinals
Norman Black	2012	2014	2	68	37	.648	105	Champions
Jong Uichico	2014	2016	2	61	41	.598	102	Champions
Nash Racela	2016	2018	2	51	41	.554	92	Finals
Eric Gonzales	2018	2018	1	1	0	1.000	1	Eliminations
Bong Ravena	2018	2020	3	49	32	.605	81	Finals
Chot Reyes	2021	Incumbent						

Awards and achievements
Preceded by (first)	PBA Centennial Cup Champions; 1998	Succeeded by (last)
Preceded by Coca-Cola Tigers; Sta. Lucia Realtors; Purefoods Tender Juicy (same) (same); Barangay Ginebra San Miguel	PBA All-Filipino/Philippine Cup Champions; 2003; 2008–09; 2010–11; 2011–12; 2012–13; 2021	Succeeded by Barangay Ginebra Kings; Purefoods Tender Juicy (same) (same); San Mig Super Coffee Mixers; San Miguel Beermen
Preceded by Red Bull Thunder; San Mig Super Coffee Mixers; San Miguel Beermen	PBA Commissioner's Cup Champions; 2011; 2015; 2024–25	Succeeded by B-Meg Llamados; Rain or Shine Elasto Painters (last)
Preceded by Barangay Ginebra San Miguel (same)	PBA Governors' Cup Champions; 2023; 2024	Succeeded by (same) (last)
