= 2019 PBA Philippine Cup finals =

Basketball tournament

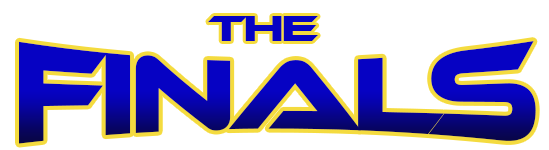
Team	Coach	Wins
(5) San Miguel Beermen	Leo Austria	4
(6) Magnolia Hotshots Pambansang Manok	Chito Victolero	3
- Dates: May 1 – 15, 2019
- MVP: June Mar Fajardo (San Miguel Beermen)
- Television: Local: ESPN5; The 5 Network; PBA Rush (HD); International: AksyonTV International
- Announcers: see Broadcast notes
- Radio network: Radyo5 (DWFM)
- Announcers: see Broadcast notes

Referees
- Game 1: J. Mariano, M. Montoya, M. Flordeliza, M. Orioste
- Game 2: P. Balao, J. Mariano, J. Narandan, M. Flordeliza
- Game 3: N. Quilinguen, R. Gruta, R. Yante, M. Montoya
- Game 4: P. Balao, R. Yante, R. Gruta, J. Narandan
- Game 5: N. Quilinguen, P. Balao, M. Montoya, M. Flordeliza
- Game 6: P. Balao, S. Pineda, M. Montoya, M. Flordeliza
- Game 7: P. Balao, S. Pineda, J. Narandan, M. Orioste

PBA Philippine Cup finals chronology
- < 2017–18 2020 >

PBA finals chronology
- < 2018 Governors' 2019 Commissioner's >

The 2019 Philippine Basketball Association (PBA) Philippine Cup finals was the best-of-7 championship series of the 2019 PBA Philippine Cup, and the conclusion of the conference's playoffs. The San Miguel Beermen and the Magnolia Hotshots Pambansang Manok competed for the 41st Philippine Cup championship and the 125th overall championship contested by the league. It was the rematch of the previous year's finals where San Miguel beat Magnolia in 5 games.

== Background ==
=== Road to the finals ===
San Miguel Beermen		Magnolia Hotshots Pambansang Manok
Finished 7–4 (.636): Tied with Barangay Ginebra and TNT in 3rd place	Elimination round	Finished 6–5 (.545) in 6th place
Head-to-head quotient: Barangay Ginebra 1.02, TNT 1.00, San Miguel 0.98 (5th place)	Tiebreaker	—N/a
Def. TNT, 2–1 (best-of-three)	Quarterfinals	Def. Barangay Ginebra, 2–1 (best-of-three)
Def. Phoenix Pulse, 4–1	Semifinals	Def. Rain or Shine, 4–3

=== Head-to-head matchup ===
February 10

Box score

San Miguel Beermen 113, Magnolia Hotshots Pambansang Manok 92
Scoring by quarter: 28–12, 23–30, 31–27, 31–23
Pts: Santos 29; Rebs: Fajardo 8 Asts: Cabagnot, Lassiter 4	Pts: Sangalang 19; Rebs: Reavis 6 Asts: Barroca 4

Smart Araneta Coliseum, Quezon City

== Series summary ==
Game	Date	Venue	Winner	Result
Game 1	May 1	Smart Araneta Coliseum	Magnolia	99–94
Game 2	May 3	Smart Araneta Coliseum	San Miguel	108–101
Game 3	May 5	Smart Araneta Coliseum	Magnolia	86–82
Game 4	May 8	Smart Araneta Coliseum	San Miguel	114–98
Game 5	May 10	Smart Araneta Coliseum	Magnolia	88–86
Game 6	May 12	Smart Araneta Coliseum	San Miguel	98–86
Game 7	May 15	Smart Araneta Coliseum	San Miguel	72–71

== Game summaries ==
=== Game 1 ===
ESPN 5

May 1
7:00pm

Box score

San Miguel Beermen 94, Magnolia Hotshots Pambansang Manok 99
Scoring by quarter: 30–34, 25–18, 18–28, 21–19
Pts: Fajardo 35; Rebs: Fajardo 21; Asts: Ross, Santos 5	Pts: Lee 18; Rebs: Sangalang 12; Asts: Lee 5
Magnolia leads series, 1–0

Smart Araneta Coliseum, Quezon City
Referees: J. Mariano, M. Montoya, M. Flordeliza, M. Orioste

=== Game 2 ===
ESPN 5

May 3
7:00pm

Box score

San Miguel Beermen 108, Magnolia Hotshots Pambansang Manok 101
Scoring by quarter: 23–22, 28–19, 32–25, 25–35
Pts: Cabagnot, Fajardo 16; Rebs: Fajardo 14; Asts: Cabagnot 6	Pts: Sangalang 18; Rebs: Lee 10; Asts: Jalalon 8
Series tied, 1–1

Smart Araneta Coliseum, Quezon City
Referees: P. Balao, J. Mariano, J. Narandan, M. Flordeliza

=== Game 3 ===
ESPN 5

May 5
6:30pm

Box score

San Miguel Beermen 82, Magnolia Hotshots Pambansang Manok 86
Scoring by quarter: 24–21, 12–24, 22–21, 24–20
Pts: Santos 19; Rebs: Fajardo 14; Asts: Ross 7	Pts: Barroca 22; Rebs: Reavis, Sangalang 15; Asts: Jalalon 5
Magnolia leads series, 2–1

Smart Araneta Coliseum, Quezon City
Referees: N. Quilinguen, R. Gruta, R. Yante, M. Montoya

=== Game 4 ===
ESPN 5

May 8
7:00pm

Box score

San Miguel Beermen 114, Magnolia Hotshots Pambansang Manok 98
Scoring by quarter: 25–27, 29–20, 33–30, 27–21
Pts: Fajardo 31; Rebs: Fajardo, Standhardinger 14; Asts: Santos 6	Pts: Barroca, Jalalon 22; Rebs: Sangalang 11; Asts: Jalalon 5
Series tied, 2–2

Smart Araneta Coliseum, Quezon City
Referees: P. Balao, R. Yante, R. Gruta, J. Narandan

=== Game 5 ===
ESPN 5

May 10
7:00pm

Box score

San Miguel Beermen 86, Magnolia Hotshots Pambansang Manok 88
Scoring by quarter: 18–27, 18–22, 27–20, 23–19
Pts: Fajardo 21; Rebs: Fajardo 22; Asts: Fajardo, Ross 4	Pts: Barroca 22; Rebs: Sangalang 14; Asts: Jalalon 9
Magnolia leads series, 3–2

Smart Araneta Coliseum, Quezon City
Referees: N. Quilinguen, P. Balao, M. Montoya, M. Flordeliza

In Game 5, Mark Barroca hits the game-winning buzzer beater.

==== Streaking incident ====
A man dressed in a Spider-Man costume was brought to jail after streaking during the fourth quarter. The man identified as Paolo Felizarta stormed the court holding a placard with "Vote! Love!" written on it with three minutes left in the game and accidentally hit San Miguel star center June Mar Fajardo on his right jaw. Fajardo fell down on the floor in pain as Felizarta was apprehended by security personnel at the venue. Felizarta was brought and detained at the Station 7 of the Quezon City Police District. There were two other men who were caught in the scene, namely Rayahn Paredes and Flenn John Lola. Lola was assumed to be Felizarta's accomplice while Paredes, who was sitting on the stands behind the basket, was caught punching Lola as he was ushered out of the court. Police said Lola and Paredes settled their dispute at a nearby barangay hall.

=== Game 6 ===
ESPN 5

May 12
6:30pm

Box score

San Miguel Beermen 98, Magnolia Hotshots Pambansang Manok 86
Scoring by quarter: 25–12, 25–24, 18–26, 30–24
Pts: Fajardo 23; Rebs: Fajardo 18; Asts: Romeo, Ross 6	Pts: Jalalon 17; Rebs: Lee 7 Asts: Jalalon 8
Series tied, 3–3

Smart Araneta Coliseum, Quezon City
Referees: P. Balao, S. Pineda, M. Montoya, M. Flordeliza

=== Game 7 ===
ESPN 5

May 15
7:00pm

Box score

San Miguel Beermen 72, Magnolia Hotshots Pambansang Manok 71
Scoring by quarter: 20–24, 5–14, 25–20, 22–13
Pts: Cabagnot 18; Rebs: Fajardo 31; Asts: three players 3 each	Pts: Sangalang 18; Rebs: Reavis 8 Asts: Jalalon, Lee 6
San Miguel wins series, 4–3

Smart Araneta Coliseum, Quezon City
Attendance: 12,871
Referees: P. Balao, S. Pineda, J. Narandan, M. Orioste

== Rosters ==
San Miguel Beermen roster
Players
Coaches

Pos.	#	POB	Name	Height	Weight	DOB (YYYY–MM–DD)	From
F/C	2	(Philippines)	Billy Mamaril	6 ft 6 in (1.98 m)	225 lb (102 kg)	1980–06–25	Bakersfield
G/F	3	(Philippines)	Von Pessumal	6 ft 2 in (1.88 m)	185 lb (84 kg)	1993–02–12	Ateneo
G	5	(Philippines)	Alex Cabagnot	6 ft 0 in (1.83 m)	185 lb (84 kg)	1982–12–08	Hawaiʻi–Hilo
G	6	(United States)	Chris Ross	6 ft 2 in (1.88 m)	180 lb (82 kg)	1985–03–09	Marshall
G	7	(Philippines)	Terrence Romeo	5 ft 11 in (1.80 m)	178 lb (81 kg)	1992–03–16	Far Eastern
G	12	(Philippines)	Paul Zamar	5 ft 10 in (1.78 m)	179 lb (81 kg)	1987–10–20	UE
G/F	13	(United States)	Marcio Lassiter	6 ft 2 in (1.88 m)	185 lb (84 kg)	1987–05–16	Cal State Fullerton
C	15	(Philippines)	June Mar Fajardo	6 ft 11 in (2.11 m)	268 lb (122 kg)	1989–11–17	Cebu
G/F	18	(Philippines)	Louie Vigil	6 ft 3 in (1.91 m)		1991–09–26	UST
G/F	22	(Philippines)	Matt Ganuelas-Rosser	6 ft 5 in (1.96 m)	186 lb (84 kg)	1990–06–13	Cal Poly Pomona
G	26	(Philippines)	Chico Lanete (IN)	6 ft 0 in (1.83 m)	180 lb (82 kg)	1979–08–01	Lyceum
F	29	(Philippines)	Arwind Santos (C)	6 ft 4 in (1.93 m)	175 lb (79 kg)	1981–06–10	Far Eastern
F/C	30	(United States)	Kelly Nabong	6 ft 6 in (1.98 m)	227 lb (103 kg)	1988–11–17	SRJC
F/C	34	(Germany)	Christian Standhardinger	6 ft 8 in (2.03 m)	220 lb (100 kg)	1989–07–04	Hawaiʻi
G/F	71	(Philippines)	Ronald Tubid	6 ft 1 in (1.85 m)	185 lb (84 kg)	1981–10–15	UE
C	95	(Philippines)	Yancy de Ocampo	6 ft 9 in (2.06 m)	245 lb (111 kg)	1980–03–11	Saint Francis of Assisi

Head coach

- (Philippines) Leo Austria

Assistant coach(es)

- (Philippines) Peter Martin (1st Assistant)
- (Philippines) Ato Agustin
- (United States) Jimmy Alapag
- (Philippines) Jorge Gallent
- (Philippines) Dayong Mendoza
- (Philippines) Biboy Ravanes
- (Philippines) Boyzie Zamar

Team manager

- (Philippines) Gelacio Abanilla
- (Philippines) Daniel Henares (Assistant)

Legend

- (C) Team captain
- (CI) Commissioner's Cup Import
- (GI) Governors' Cup Import
- (EI) EASL Import
- (DP) Unsigned draft pick
- (FA) Free agent
- (IN) Inactive
- (S) Suspended
- (R) Rookie
- Injured

Roster

Magnolia Hotshots Pambansang Manok roster
Players
Coaches

Pos.	#	POB	Name	Height	Weight	DOB (YYYY–MM–DD)	From
G	2	(Philippines)	Justin Melton	5 ft 11 in (1.80 m)	163 lb (74 kg)	1987–04–07	Mount Olive
G	3	(Philippines)	Paul Lee	6 ft 0 in (1.83 m)	200 lb (91 kg)	1989–02–14	UE
F/C	4	(United States)	Rafi Reavis (C)	6 ft 8 in (2.03 m)	210 lb (95 kg)	1977–07–26	Coppin State
G	6	(Philippines)	Jio Jalalon	5 ft 9 in (1.75 m)	150 lb (68 kg)	1992–08–02	Arellano
G	8	(Philippines)	Peter June Simon	6 ft 0 in (1.83 m)	180 lb (82 kg)	1980–06–01	Mindanao
G/F	9	(United States)	Robbie Herndon	6 ft 3 in (1.91 m)	180 lb (82 kg)	1993–07–16	San Francisco State
F/C	10	(Philippines)	Ian Sangalang	6 ft 7 in (2.01 m)	212 lb (96 kg)	1991–12–20	San Sebastian
F	11	(Philippines)	Michael Calisaan (R)	6 ft 4 in (1.93 m)		1995–02–27	San Sebastian
G/F	12	(Philippines)	Riego Gamalinda	6 ft 3 in (1.91 m)	184 lb (83 kg)	1986–05–25	San Beda
G	14	(Philippines)	Mark Barroca	5 ft 10 in (1.78 m)	170 lb (77 kg)	1986–04–25	Far Eastern
F	15	(Philippines)	Marc Pingris (injured)	6 ft 4 in (1.93 m)	210 lb (95 kg)	1981–10–16	PSBA
F	17	(Philippines)	Aldrech Ramos	6 ft 6 in (1.98 m)	190 lb (86 kg)	1988–04–03	Far Eastern
G/F	19	(United States)	Rome dela Rosa	6 ft 3 in (1.91 m)	185 lb (84 kg)	1990–12–11	San Beda
G	29	(Philippines)	Alvin Abundo	5 ft 8 in (1.73 m)	150 lb (68 kg)	1992–10–29	Centro Escolar
F/C	32	(United States)	Kyle Pascual	6 ft 6 in (1.98 m)	210 lb (95 kg)	1990–04–13	San Beda
F/C	91	(Philippines)	Rodney Brondial	6 ft 5 in (1.96 m)	210 lb (95 kg)	1990–11–20	Adamson

Head coach

- (Philippines) Chito Victolero

Assistant coach(es)

- (Philippines) Jason Webb (1st Assistant)
- (Philippines) Johnny Abarrientos
- (Philippines) Mon Jose
- (Philippines) Angelito Esguerra
- (Philippines) Tony Boy Espinosa
- (Philippines) Juno Sauler
- (Philippines) Paul Sorongon

Team manager

- (Philippines) Alvin Patrimonio

Legend

- (C) Team captain
- (CI) Commissioner's Cup Import
- (GI) Governors' Cup Import
- (EI) EASL Import
- (DP) Unsigned draft pick
- (FA) Free agent
- (IN) Inactive
- (S) Suspended
- (R) Rookie
- Injured

Roster

== Broadcast notes ==
The Philippine Cup finals were aired on TV5 with simulcasts on PBA Rush (both in standard and high definition). 5's radio arm, Radyo5 provided the radio play-by-play coverage.

ESPN5 provided online livestreaming via their official YouTube account using the TV5 feed.

The PBA Rush broadcast provided English-language coverage of the finals.

Game	ESPN5			PBA Rush (English)		
Game	Play-by-play	Analyst(s)	Courtside reporters	Play-by-play	Analyst(s)	Courtside reporters
Game 1	Magoo Marjon	Andy Jao and Ryan Gregorio	Apple David	Carlo Pamintuan	Tim Cone	
Game 2	Charlie Cuna	Dominic Uy and Tim Cone	Denise Tan		Ali Peek	Rizza Diaz
Game 3	Sev Sarmenta	Juan Banal and Tim Cone	Carla Lizardo	Carlo Pamintuan	Norman Black	
Game 4	Chuck Araneta	Quinito Henson and Norman Black	Rizza Diaz	Paolo del Rosario	Richard del Rosario	Bea Escudero
Game 5	Magoo Marjon	Richard del Rosario and Ryan Gregorio		Paolo del Rosario	Dominic Uy	Rizza Diaz
Game 6	Charlie Cuna	Andy Jao and Tim Cone	Selena Dagdag	Carlo Pamintuan	Norman Black	Rizza Diaz
Game 7	Sev Sarmenta	Dominic Uy and Richard del Rosario	Apple David	Carlo Pamintuan	Tim Cone	Rizza Diaz

- Additional Game 7 crew:
  - Trophy Presentation: James Velasquez
  - Dugout Celebration Interviewer: Lyn Olivario
