= 2017–18 PBA Philippine Cup finals =

Basketball cup finals

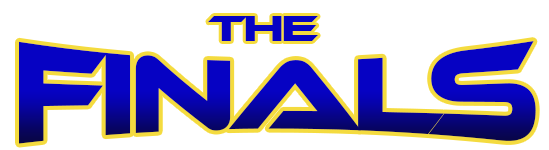
Team	Coach	Wins
(1) San Miguel Beermen	Leo Austria	4
(2) Magnolia Hotshots Pambansang Manok	Chito Victolero	1
- Dates: March 23 – April 6, 2018
- MVP: June Mar Fajardo (San Miguel Beermen)
- Television: Local: ESPN5; TV5; PBA Rush (HD); International: AksyonTV International
- Announcers: see Broadcast notes
- Radio network: Radyo5 (DWFM)
- Announcers: see Broadcast notes

Referees
- Game 1: P. Balao, S. Pineda, R. Yante, M. Montoya
- Game 2: N. Quilinguen, E. Tangkion, R. Gruta, M. Flordeliza
- Game 3: P. Balao, S. Pineda, R. Gruta, E. Tangkion
- Game 4: J. Mariano, S. Pineda, R. Yante, M. Flordeliza
- Game 5: N. Quilinguen, P. Balao, E. Tangkion, J. Narandan

PBA Philippine Cup finals chronology
- < 2016–17 2019 >

PBA finals chronology
- < 2017 Governors' 2018 Commissioner's >

The 2017–18 Philippine Basketball Association (PBA) Philippine Cup finals was the best-of-7 championship series of the 2017–18 PBA Philippine Cup and the conclusion of the conference's playoffs. The San Miguel Beermen and the Magnolia Hotshots Pambansang Manok competed for the 40th Philippine Cup championship and the 122nd overall championship contested by the league. San Miguel won the series in 5 games to be the first team in history to win four straight Philippine Cup titles.

== Background ==
=== Road to the finals ===
San Miguel Beermen		Magnolia Hotshots Pambansang Manok
Finished 8–3 (.727): Tied with Magnolia in 1st place	Elimination round	Finished 8–3 (.727): Tied with San Miguel in 1st place
1.02 (1st place)	Tiebreaker*	0.99 (2nd place)
Def. TNT in one game (twice-to-beat advantage)	Quarterfinals	Def. GlobalPort in one game (twice-to-beat advantage)
Def. Barangay Ginebra, 4–1	Semifinals	Def. NLEX, 4–2

=== Head-to-head matchup ===
February 4

Box score

San Miguel Beermen 77, Magnolia Hotshots Pambansang Manok 76
Scoring by quarter: 21–20, 13–24, 18–16, 25–16
Pts: Fajardo 19; Rebs: Fajardo 21; Asts: Lassiter 5	Pts: Barroca 21; Rebs: Pingris 14; Asts: three players 4

Ynares Center, Antipolo
Referees: P. Balao, R. Yante, M. Orioste, N. Ranido

== Series summary ==
Game	Date	Venue	Winner	Result
Game 1	Friday, March 23	Smart Araneta Coliseum	Magnolia	105–103
Game 2	Sunday, March 25	Mall of Asia Arena	San Miguel	92–77
Game 3	Sunday, April 1	Smart Araneta Coliseum	San Miguel	111–87
Game 4	Wednesday, April 4	Smart Araneta Coliseum	San Miguel	84–80
Game 5	Friday, April 6	Mall of Asia Arena	San Miguel	108–99 (2OT)

== Game summaries ==
=== Game 1 ===
March 23
7:00pm

Box score

San Miguel Beermen 103, Magnolia Hotshots Pambansang Manok 105
Scoring by quarter: 33–25, 30–22, 26–28, 14–30
Pts: Fajardo 31; Rebs: Fajardo 18; Asts: Cabagnot 9	Pts: Sangalang 29; Rebs: Reavis, Sangalang 9 Asts: Barroca, Lee 5
Magnolia leads series, 1–0

Smart Araneta Coliseum, Quezon City
Referees: P. Balao, S. Pineda, R. Yante, M. Montoya

=== Game 2 ===
March 25
6:30pm

Box score

San Miguel Beermen 92, Magnolia Hotshots Pambansang Manok 77
Scoring by quarter: 19–17, 29–18, 27–22, 17–20
Pts: Santos 24; Rebs: Fajardo 13; Asts: Ross 10	Pts: Barroca 18; Rebs: dela Rosa, Reavis 6 Asts: three players 3
Series tied, 1–1

Mall of Asia Arena, Pasay
Referees: N. Quilinguen, E. Tangkion, R. Gruta, M. Flordeliza

=== Game 3 ===
April 1
6:30pm

Box score

San Miguel Beermen 111, Magnolia Hotshots Pambansang Manok 87
Scoring by quarter: 29–22, 21–27, 25–19, 36–19
Pts: Lassiter 24; Rebs: Fajardo 17; Asts: Cabagnot 8	Pts: Barroca 22; Rebs: Reavis 14; Asts: Lee 7
San Miguel leads series, 2–1

Smart Araneta Coliseum, Quezon City
Referees: P. Balao, S. Pineda, R. Gruta, E. Tangkion

=== Game 4 ===
April 4
7:00pm

Box score

San Miguel Beermen 84, Magnolia Hotshots Pambansang Manok 80
Scoring by quarter: 14–20, 31–26, 24–18, 15–16
Pts: Cabagnot 27; Rebs: Fajardo 13; Asts: Ross 7	Pts: Sangalang 22; Rebs: Sangalang 11; Asts: Lee 6
San Miguel leads series, 3–1

Smart Araneta Coliseum, Quezon City
Referees: J. Mariano, S. Pineda, R. Yante, M. Flordeliza

=== Game 5 ===
April 6
7:00pm

Box score

San Miguel Beermen 108, Magnolia Hotshots Pambansang Manok 99 (2OT)
Scoring by quarter: 19–21, 18–32, 23–21, 26–12, Overtime: 8–8, 14–5
Pts: Fajardo 42; Rebs: Fajardo 20; Asts: Ross 11	Pts: Lee 21; Rebs: Reavis 12; Asts: Barroca 8
San Miguel wins series, 4–1

Mall of Asia Arena, Pasay
Attendance: 10,054
Referees: N. Quilinguen, P. Balao, E. Tangkion, J. Narandan

== Rosters ==
San Miguel Beermen roster
Players
Coaches

Pos.	#	POB	Name	Height	Weight	DOB (YYYY–MM–DD)	From
G	1	(Philippines)	Brian Heruela	5 ft 10 in (1.78 m)	195 lb (88 kg)	1989–04–13	Cebu
F/C	2	(Philippines)	Billy Mamaril	6 ft 6 in (1.98 m)	225 lb (102 kg)	1980–06–25	Bakersfield
G/F	3	(Philippines)	Von Pessumal	6 ft 2 in (1.88 m)	185 lb (84 kg)	1993–02–12	Ateneo
G	5	(Philippines)	Alex Cabagnot	6 ft 0 in (1.83 m)	185 lb (84 kg)	1982–12–08	Hawaiʻi–Hilo
G	6	(United States)	Chris Ross	6 ft 2 in (1.88 m)	180 lb (82 kg)	1985–03–09	Marshall
G/F	13	(United States)	Marcio Lassiter	6 ft 2 in (1.88 m)	185 lb (84 kg)	1987–05–16	Cal State Fullerton
C	15	(Philippines)	June Mar Fajardo	6 ft 11 in (2.11 m)	268 lb (122 kg)	1989–11–17	Cebu
G/F	18	(Philippines)	Louie Vigil (R)	6 ft 3 in (1.91 m)		1991–09–26	UST
G/F	22	(Philippines)	Matt Ganuelas-Rosser	6 ft 5 in (1.96 m)	186 lb (84 kg)	1990–06–13	Cal Poly Pomona
G/F	23	(Philippines)	Keith Agovida	6 ft 2 in (1.88 m)	170 lb (77 kg)	1990–02–14	Arellano
G	26	(Philippines)	Chico Lanete	6 ft 0 in (1.83 m)	180 lb (82 kg)	1979–08–01	Lyceum
F	27	(Philippines)	Gabby Espinas	6 ft 4 in (1.93 m)	208 lb (94 kg)	1982–01–03	Philippine Christian
F	29	(Philippines)	Arwind Santos (C)	6 ft 4 in (1.93 m)	175 lb (79 kg)	1981–06–10	Far Eastern
F	33	(Australia)	David Semerad (injured)	6 ft 4 in (1.93 m)	220 lb (100 kg)	1991–04–25	San Beda
C	95	(Philippines)	Yancy de Ocampo	6 ft 9 in (2.06 m)	245 lb (111 kg)	1980–03–11	Saint Francis of Assisi

Head coach

- (Philippines) Leo Austria

Assistant coach(es)

- (Philippines) Peter Martin (1st Assistant)
- (Philippines) Biboy Ravanes
- (Philippines) Dayong Mendoza
- (Philippines) Boyzie Zamar
- (Philippines) Ato Agustin
- (Philippines) Jorge Gallent

Team manager

- (Philippines) Gelacio Abanilla
- (Philippines) Daniel Henares (Assistant)

Legend

- (C) Team captain
- (CI) Commissioner's Cup Import
- (GI) Governors' Cup Import
- (EI) EASL Import
- (DP) Unsigned draft pick
- (FA) Free agent
- (IN) Inactive
- (S) Suspended
- (R) Rookie
- Injured

Roster

Magnolia Hotshots Pambansang Manok roster
Players
Coaches

Pos.	#	POB	Name	Height	Weight	DOB (YYYY–MM–DD)	From
G	2	(Philippines)	Justin Melton	5 ft 11 in (1.80 m)	163 lb (74 kg)	1987–04–07	Mount Olive
G	3	(Philippines)	Paul Lee	6 ft 0 in (1.83 m)	200 lb (91 kg)	1989–02–14	UE
F/C	4	(United States)	Rafi Reavis (C)	6 ft 8 in (2.03 m)	210 lb (95 kg)	1977–07–26	Coppin State
G	6	(Philippines)	Jio Jalalon	5 ft 9 in (1.75 m)	150 lb (68 kg)	1992–08–02	Arellano
G	8	(Philippines)	Peter June Simon	6 ft 0 in (1.83 m)	180 lb (82 kg)	1980–06–01	Mindanao
G/F	9	(United States)	Robbie Herndon (R)	6 ft 3 in (1.91 m)	180 lb (82 kg)	1993–07–16	San Francisco State
F/C	10	(Philippines)	Ian Sangalang	6 ft 7 in (2.01 m)	212 lb (96 kg)	1991–12–20	San Sebastian
G/F	12	(Philippines)	Riego Gamalinda	6 ft 3 in (1.91 m)	184 lb (83 kg)	1986–05–25	San Beda
G/F	13	(Philippines)	Gryann Mendoza	6 ft 1 in (1.85 m)	180 lb (82 kg)	1990–09–09	Far Eastern
G	14	(Philippines)	Mark Barroca	5 ft 10 in (1.78 m)	170 lb (77 kg)	1986–04–25	Far Eastern
F	15	(Philippines)	Marc Pingris (injured) (C)	6 ft 4 in (1.93 m)	210 lb (95 kg)	1981–10–16	PSBA
F	17	(Philippines)	Aldrech Ramos	6 ft 6 in (1.98 m)	190 lb (86 kg)	1988–04–03	Far Eastern
G/F	19	(United States)	Rome dela Rosa	6 ft 3 in (1.91 m)	185 lb (84 kg)	1990–12–11	San Beda
F/C	32	(United States)	Kyle Pascual	6 ft 6 in (1.98 m)	210 lb (95 kg)	1990–04–13	San Beda
F/C	91	(Philippines)	Rodney Brondial	6 ft 5 in (1.96 m)	210 lb (95 kg)	1990–11–20	Adamson

Head coach

- (Philippines) Chito Victolero

Assistant coach(es)

- (Philippines) Jason Webb (1st Assistant)
- (Philippines) Johnny Abarrientos
- (Philippines) Mon Jose
- (Philippines) Angelito Esguerra
- (Philippines) Tony Boy Espinosa
- (Philippines) Juno Sauler
- (Philippines) Paul Sorongon

Team manager

- (Philippines) Alvin Patrimonio

Legend

- (C) Team captain
- (CI) Commissioner's Cup Import
- (GI) Governors' Cup Import
- (EI) EASL Import
- (DP) Unsigned draft pick
- (FA) Free agent
- (IN) Inactive
- (S) Suspended
- (R) Rookie
- Injured

Roster

== Broadcast notes ==
The Philippine Cup finals was aired on TV5 with simulcasts on PBA Rush (both in standard and high definition). TV5's radio arm, Radyo5 provided the radio play-by-play coverage.

ESPN5 also provided online livestreaming via their official YouTube account using the 5 Network feed.

The PBA Rush broadcast provided English-language coverage of the finals.

Game	ESPN5			PBA Rush (English)		
Game	Play-by-play	Analyst(s)	Courtside reporters	Play-by-play	Analyst(s)	Courtside reporters
Game 1	Magoo Marjon	Andy Jao and Ryan Gregorio	Apple David	James Velasquez	Eric Reyes	Rizza Diaz
Game 2	Sev Sarmenta	Norman Black and Quinito Henson	Selina Dagdag	Carlo Pamintuan	Ali Peek	Rizza Diaz
Game 3	Charlie Cuna	Alex Compton and Ryan Gregorio	Carla Lizardo	Chiqui Reyes	Charles Tiu	Apple David
Game 4	Magoo Marjon	Andy Jao and Tim Cone	Rizza Diaz	Jutt Sulit	Jong Uichico	Carla Lizardo
Game 5	Sev Sarmenta	Richard del Rosario and Quinito Henson	Selina Dagdag	James Velasquez	Tony dela Cruz	Chino Lui Pio

- Additional Game 5 crew:
  - Trophy presentation: Magoo Marjon
  - Dugout celebration interviewer: Apple David
