= 2018 PBA Governors' Cup finals =

Basketball tournament in the Philippines

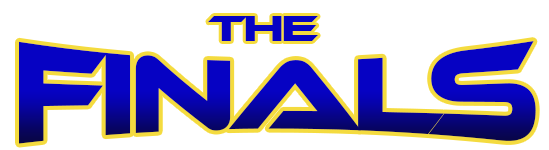
Team	Coach	Wins
(4) Magnolia Hotshots Pambansang Manok	Chito Victolero	4
(3) Alaska Aces	Alex Compton	2
- Dates: December 5–19, 2018
- MVP: Mark Barroca (Magnolia Hotshots Pambansang Manok)
- Television: Local: ESPN5; The 5 Network; PBA Rush (HD); International: AksyonTV International
- Announcers: see Broadcast notes
- Radio network: Radyo5 (DWFM)
- Announcers: see Broadcast notes

Referees
- Game 1: N. Guevarra, S. Pineda, M. Orioste, N. Cortes
- Game 2: P. Balao, M. Montoya, J. Narandan, A. Nubla
- Game 3: P. Balao, R. Yante, J. Narandan, A. Nubla
- Game 4: N. Quilinguen, S. Pineda, R. Dacanay, M. Orioste
- Game 5: P. Balao, N. Guevarra, M. Montoya, J. Narandan
- Game 6: P. Balao, S. Pineda, E. Tangkion, M. Orioste

PBA Governors' Cup finals chronology
- < 2017 2019 >

PBA finals chronology
- < 2018 Commissioner's 2019 Philippine >

The 2018 Philippine Basketball Association (PBA) Governors' Cup finals was the best-of-7 championship series of the 2018 PBA Governors' Cup, and the conclusion of the conference's playoffs. The Alaska Aces and the Magnolia Hotshots Pambansang Manok competed for the 18th Governors' Cup championship and the 124th overall championship contested by the league.

Due to the preparations of the Philippines men's national basketball team for the fifth window of the 2019 FIBA World Cup Qualifiers, the start of this finals series started on December 5, 2018; two weeks after the semifinal round finished. This also marked Alaska's last finals appearance before their departure from the PBA in 2022.

== Background ==
=== Road to the finals ===
Magnolia Hotshots Pambansang Manok		Alaska Aces
Finished 8–3 (.727): Tied with Phoenix and Alaska in 2nd place	Elimination round	Finished 8–3 (.727): Tied with Phoenix and Magnolia in 2nd place
Phoenix (2nd): 1.011; Alaska (3rd): 1.006; Magnolia (4th): 0.982	Tiebreaker*	Phoenix (2nd): 1.011; Alaska (3rd): 1.006; Magnolia (4th): 0.982
Def. Blackwater in one game (twice-to-beat advantage)	Quarterfinals	Def. San Miguel in one game (twice-to-beat advantage)
Def. Barangay Ginebra, 3–1	Semifinals	Def. Meralco, 3–1

=== Head-to-head matchup ===
October 14

Box score

Magnolia Hotshots Pambansang Manok 83, Alaska Aces 73
Scoring by quarter: 11–15, 34–16, 20–25, 18–17
Pts: Travis 19; Rebs: Travis 17; Asts: Jalalon 5	Pts: Harris 24; Rebs: Harris 25; Asts: Banchero 7

Smart Araneta Coliseum, Quezon City
Referees: J. Mariano, N. Guevarra, R. Yante, B. Oliva

== Series summary ==
Game	Date	Venue	Winner	Result
Game 1	December 5	Mall of Asia Arena	Magnolia	100–84
Game 2	December 7	Smart Araneta Coliseum	Magnolia	77–71
Game 3	December 9	Ynares Center	Alaska	100–71
Game 4	December 12	Smart Araneta Coliseum	Alaska	90–76
Game 5	December 14	Smart Araneta Coliseum	Magnolia	79–78
Game 6	December 19	Ynares Center	Magnolia	102–86

=== Game 1 ===
ESPN 5

December 5
7:00 pm

Box score

Magnolia Hotshots Pambansang Manok 100, Alaska Aces 84
Scoring by quarter: 24–14, 28–26, 25–18, 23–26
Pts: Travis 29; Rebs: Travis 13; Asts: Jalalon 9	Pts: Harris 20; Rebs: Harris 15; Asts: Banchero 6
Magnolia leads series, 1–0

Mall of Asia Arena, Pasay
Referees: N. Guevarra, S. Pineda, M. Orioste, N. Cortes

Starters:			Pts	Reb	Ast
PG	6	Jio Jalalon	7	12	9
PG	14	Mark Barroca	16	2	3
SF	9	Robbie Herndon	9	3	0
PF	24	Romeo Travis	29	13	5
C	4	Rafi Reavis	4	6	1
Reserves:					
G	2	Justin Melton	7	2	2
G	3	Paul Lee	14	3	2
G	8	Peter June Simon	8	0	0
F/C	10	Ian Sangalang	10	3	0
G/F	13	Gryann Mendoza	0	0	0
F	19	Rome dela Rosa	0	1	0
F/C	32	Kyle Pascual	0	0	0
F/C	91	Rodney Brondial	0	2	0
G/F	12	Riego Gamalinda	DNP		
F	15	Marc Pingris (injured)	DNP		
F	17	Aldrech Ramos	DNP		
G	29	Alvin Abundo	DNP		
Head coach:
Chito Victolero

Hotshots	Statistics	Aces
40/85 (47.1%)	Field goals	29/71 (40.8%)
8/18 (44.4%)	3-pt field goals	7/28 (25.0%)
12/15 (80.0%)	Free throws	19/32 (59.4%)
17	Offensive rebounds	15
33	Defensive rebounds	28
50	Total rebounds	43
22	Assists	20
21	Turnovers	25
13	Steals	14
2	Blocks	5
25	Fouls	20

Starters:			Pts	Reb	Ast
PG	4	Chris Banchero	12	3	6
SG	0	Simon Enciso	9	2	2
SF	61	Kevin Racal	6	3	1
PF	52	Mike Harris	20	15	2
C	9	Nonoy Baclao	0	1	0
Reserves:					
C	7	Sonny Thoss	3	1	0
F	11	Jake Pascual	5	4	1
F	12	Jeron Teng	10	4	4
G	17	Chris Exciminiano	0	3	0
F	21	Carl Bryan Cruz	3	0	0
G	23	Abel Galliguez	3	0	0
F/C	32	Yutien Andrada	0	0	0
G	42	JVee Casio	7	2	3
F	87	Vic Manuel	6	0	1
C	10	Marion Magat	DNP		
G	26	Davon Potts	DNP		
Head coach:
Alex Compton

=== Game 2 ===
ESPN 5

December 7
7:00 pm

Box score

Magnolia Hotshots Pambansang Manok 77, Alaska Aces 71
Scoring by quarter: 20–22, 16–19, 25–24, 16–6
Pts: Travis 24; Rebs: Travis 9 Asts: Jalalon 7	Pts: Harris 22; Rebs: Harris 13; Asts: Enciso 7
Magnolia leads series, 2–0

Smart Araneta Coliseum, Quezon City
Referees: P. Balao, M. Montoya, J. Narandan, A. Nubla

Starters:			Pts	Reb	Ast
PG	6	Jio Jalalon	7	7	7
PG	14	Mark Barroca	2	2	4
SF	9	Robbie Herndon	0	1	0
PF	24	Romeo Travis	24	9	3
C	4	Rafi Reavis	6	3	1
Reserves:					
G	2	Justin Melton	5	4	1
G	3	Paul Lee	8	4	3
G	8	Peter June Simon	4	0	0
F/C	10	Ian Sangalang	11	5	0
F	19	Rome dela Rosa	7	2	0
F/C	32	Kyle Pascual	0	1	0
F/C	91	Rodney Brondial	3	2	0
G/F	12	Riego Gamalinda	DNP		
G/F	13	Gryann Mendoza	DNP		
F	15	Marc Pingris (injured)	DNP		
F	17	Aldrech Ramos	DNP		
G	29	Alvin Abundo	DNP		
Head coach:
Chito Victolero

Hotshots	Statistics	Aces
32/71 (45.1%)	Field goals	29/78 (37.2%)
4/11 (36.4%)	3-pt field goals	5/22 (22.7%)
9/18 (50.0%)	Free throws	8/11 (72.7%)
10	Offensive rebounds	17
31	Defensive rebounds	32
41	Total rebounds	49
19	Assists	17
22	Turnovers	26
20	Steals	13
3	Blocks	4
18	Fouls	21

Starters:			Pts	Reb	Ast
PG	4	Chris Banchero	9	9	1
SG	0	Simon Enciso	6	1	7
SF	61	Kevin Racal	7	3	1
PF	52	Mike Harris	22	13	1
C	9	Nonoy Baclao	0	4	0
Reserves:					
C	7	Sonny Thoss	2	1	0
F	11	Jake Pascual	0	2	0
F	12	Jeron Teng	4	4	2
G	17	Chris Exciminiano	4	0	0
F	21	Carl Bryan Cruz	2	1	0
G	23	Abel Galliguez	0	1	0
G	42	JVee Casio	5	0	4
F	87	Vic Manuel	10	5	1
C	10	Marion Magat	DNP		
G	26	Davon Potts	DNP		
F/C	32	Yutien Andrada	DNP		
Head coach:
Alex Compton

=== Game 3 ===
ESPN 5

December 9
6:30 pm

Box score

Magnolia Hotshots Pambansang Manok 71, Alaska Aces 100
Scoring by quarter: 22–16, 14–34, 14–33, 21–17
Pts: Travis 18; Rebs: Jalalon 6 Asts: Barroca, Travis 3	Pts: Harris 36; Rebs: Harris 18; Asts: Banchero 11
Magnolia leads series, 2–1

Ynares Center, Antipolo
Referees: P. Balao, R. Yante, J. Narandan, A. Nubla

Starters:			Pts	Reb	Ast
PG	6	Jio Jalalon	2	6	1
PG	14	Mark Barroca	13	3	3
SF	9	Robbie Herndon	7	5	0
PF	24	Romeo Travis	18	3	3
C	4	Rafi Reavis	3	3	1
Reserves:					
G	2	Justin Melton	2	2	0
G	3	Paul Lee	2	4	1
G	8	Peter June Simon	0	0	0
F/C	10	Ian Sangalang	7	4	0
G/F	12	Riego Gamalinda	0	2	0
G/F	13	Gryann Mendoza	6	2	1
F	17	Aldrech Ramos	2	2	0
F	19	Rome dela Rosa	5	3	0
G	29	Alvin Abundo	4	2	1
F/C	32	Kyle Pascual	0	4	0
F/C	91	Rodney Brondial	0	2	0
F	15	Marc Pingris (injured)	DNP		
Head coach:
Chito Victolero

Hotshots	Statistics	Aces
26/77 (33.8%)	Field goals	38/78 (48.7%)
6/17 (35.3%)	3-pt field goals	11/29 (37.9%)
13/21 (61.9%)	Free throws	13/16 (81.3%)
19	Offensive rebounds	11
30	Defensive rebounds	35
49	Total rebounds	46
11	Assists	25
20	Turnovers	15
11	Steals	4
4	Blocks	4
27	Fouls	24

Starters:			Pts	Reb	Ast
PG	4	Chris Banchero	6	3	11
SG	0	Simon Enciso	12	0	2
SF	61	Kevin Racal	2	4	1
PF	11	Jake Pascual	4	5	1
PF	52	Mike Harris	36	18	1
Reserves:					
F/C	9	Nonoy Baclao	2	0	0
C	10	Marion Magat	0	2	0
F	12	Jeron Teng	4	3	4
G	17	Chris Exciminiano	0	1	0
F	21	Carl Bryan Cruz	10	1	1
G	23	Abel Galliguez	4	2	2
G	26	Davon Potts	0	2	0
F/C	32	Yutien Andrada	2	0	0
G	42	JVee Casio	4	2	2
F	87	Vic Manuel	14	2	0
C	7	Sonny Thoss	DNP		
Head coach:
Alex Compton

=== Game 4 ===
ESPN 5

December 12
7:00 pm

Box score

Magnolia Hotshots Pambansang Manok 76, Alaska Aces 90
Scoring by quarter: 22–19, 10–23, 18–21, 26–27
Pts: Travis 29; Rebs: Travis 13; Asts: Jalalon 6	Pts: Harris 34; Rebs: Harris 22; Asts: Banchero, Enciso 5
Series tied, 2–2

Smart Araneta Coliseum, Quezon City
Referees: N. Quilinguen, S. Pineda, R. Dacanay, M. Orioste

Starters:			Pts	Reb	Ast
PG	6	Jio Jalalon	7	7	6
PG	14	Mark Barroca	8	4	2
SG	3	Paul Lee	14	8	2
PF	24	Romeo Travis	29	13	4
C	4	Rafi Reavis	4	0	2
Reserves:					
G	2	Justin Melton	1	2	1
F	9	Robbie Herndon	0	0	0
F/C	10	Ian Sangalang	11	7	0
F	19	Rome dela Rosa	0	2	0
F/C	91	Rodney Brondial	2	2	0
G	8	Peter June Simon	DNP		
G/F	12	Riego Gamalinda	DNP		
G/F	13	Gryann Mendoza	DNP		
F	15	Marc Pingris (injured)	DNP		
F	17	Aldrech Ramos	DNP		
G	29	Alvin Abundo	DNP		
F/C	32	Kyle Pascual	DNP		
Head coach:
Chito Victolero

Hotshots	Statistics	Aces
27/80 (33.8%)	Field goals	31/78 (39.7%)
9/32 (28.1%)	3-pt field goals	6/27 (22.2%)
13/20 (65.0%)	Free throws	22/30 (73.3%)
14	Offensive rebounds	18
34	Defensive rebounds	42
48	Total rebounds	60
17	Assists	21
13	Turnovers	16
7	Steals	5
3	Blocks	6
32	Fouls	24

Starters:			Pts	Reb	Ast
PG	4	Chris Banchero	17	6	5
SG	0	Simon Enciso	0	1	5
SF	61	Kevin Racal	8	6	2
PF	11	Jake Pascual	9	5	2
PF	52	Mike Harris	34	22	3
Reserves:					
F/C	9	Nonoy Baclao	3	2	0
F	12	Jeron Teng	7	6	1
G	17	Chris Exciminiano	0	1	0
F	21	Carl Bryan Cruz	3	1	1
G	23	Abel Galliguez	5	2	0
G	42	JVee Casio	0	1	2
F	87	Vic Manuel	4	2	0
C	7	Sonny Thoss	DNP		
C	10	Marion Magat	DNP		
G	26	Davon Potts	DNP		
F/C	32	Yutien Andrada	DNP		
Head coach:
Alex Compton

=== Game 5 ===
ESPN 5

December 14
7:00 pm

Box score

Magnolia Hotshots Pambansang Manok 79, Alaska Aces 78
Scoring by quarter: 29–28, 24–12, 12–22, 14–16
Pts: Sangalang 20; Rebs: Travis 17; Asts: Travis 6	Pts: Harris 28; Rebs: Harris 20; Asts: Banchero 8
Magnolia leads series, 3–2

Smart Araneta Coliseum, Quezon City
Referees: P. Balao, N. Guevarra, M. Montoya, J. Narandan

Starters:			Pts	Reb	Ast
PG	14	Mark Barroca	14	3	3
SG	3	Paul Lee	11	10	2
SF	19	Rome dela Rosa	4	3	1
PF	24	Romeo Travis	10	17	6
C	10	Ian Sangalang	20	6	2
Reserves:					
G	2	Justin Melton	0	2	0
C	4	Rafi Reavis	1	2	2
G	6	Jio Jalalon	13	5	1
G	8	Peter June Simon	0	0	0
F	9	Robbie Herndon	6	1	0
F/C	91	Rodney Brondial	0	3	1
G/F	12	Riego Gamalinda	DNP		
G/F	13	Gryann Mendoza	DNP		
F	15	Marc Pingris (injured)	DNP		
F	17	Aldrech Ramos	DNP		
G	29	Alvin Abundo	DNP		
F/C	32	Kyle Pascual	DNP		
Head coach:
Chito Victolero

Hotshots	Statistics	Aces
28/79 (35.4%)	Field goals	29/75 (38.7%)
6/26 (23.1%)	3-pt field goals	8/27 (29.6%)
17/24 (70.8%)	Free throws	12/13 (92.3%)
21	Offensive rebounds	10
36	Defensive rebounds	31
57	Total rebounds	41
18	Assists	22
13	Turnovers	13
5	Steals	7
1	Blocks	4
23	Fouls	30

Starters:			Pts	Reb	Ast
PG	4	Chris Banchero	3	6	8
SG	0	Simon Enciso	13	2	3
SF	61	Kevin Racal	13	1	3
PF	11	Jake Pascual	6	5	2
PF	52	Mike Harris	28	20	5
Reserves:					
F/C	9	Nonoy Baclao	0	3	1
F	12	Jeron Teng	2	1	0
G	17	Chris Exciminiano	5	0	0
F	21	Carl Bryan Cruz	4	2	0
G	23	Abel Galliguez	0	0	0
G	42	JVee Casio	2	0	0
F	87	Vic Manuel	2	0	0
C	7	Sonny Thoss	DNP		
C	10	Marion Magat	DNP		
G	26	Davon Potts	DNP		
F/C	32	Yutien Andrada	DNP		
Head coach:
Alex Compton

=== Game 6 ===
ESPN 5

December 19
7:00 pm

Box score

Magnolia Hotshots Pambansang Manok 102, Alaska Aces 86
Scoring by quarter: 32–18, 28–24, 20–21, 22–23
Pts: Travis 32; Rebs: Travis 17; Asts: Travis 6	Pts: Harris 26; Rebs: Harris 24; Asts: Enciso 7
Magnolia wins series, 4–2

Ynares Center, Antipolo
Referees: P. Balao, S. Pineda, E. Tangkion, M. Orioste

Starters:			Pts	Reb	Ast
PG	14	Mark Barroca	13	5	4
SG	3	Paul Lee	16	4	2
SF	19	Rome dela Rosa	7	2	2
PF	24	Romeo Travis	32	17	6
C	10	Ian Sangalang	16	2	0
Reserves:					
G	2	Justin Melton	0	2	1
C	4	Rafi Reavis	0	5	1
G	6	Jio Jalalon	11	4	5
F	9	Robbie Herndon	5	1	0
F/C	91	Rodney Brondial	2	2	0
G	8	Peter June Simon	DNP		
G/F	12	Riego Gamalinda	DNP		
G/F	13	Gryann Mendoza	DNP		
F	15	Marc Pingris (injured)	DNP		
F	17	Aldrech Ramos	DNP		
G	29	Alvin Abundo	DNP		
F/C	32	Kyle Pascual	DNP		
Head coach:
Chito Victolero

Hotshots	Statistics	Aces
38/80 (47.5%)	Field goals	30/83 (36.1%)
10/30 (33.3%)	3-pt field goals	8/35 (22.9%)
16/20 (80.0%)	Free throws	18/29 (62.1%)
12	Offensive rebounds	21
35	Defensive rebounds	32
47	Total rebounds	53
21	Assists	18
10	Turnovers	12
8	Steals	5
2	Blocks	2
26	Fouls	24

Starters:			Pts	Reb	Ast
PG	4	Chris Banchero	20	3	4
SG	0	Simon Enciso	9	6	7
SF	61	Kevin Racal	5	3	0
PF	11	Jake Pascual	0	0	0
PF	52	Mike Harris	26	24	4
Reserves:					
C	7	Sonny Thoss	2	2	1
F/C	9	Nonoy Baclao	4	3	0
C	10	Marion Magat	0	0	0
F	12	Jeron Teng	14	3	0
F	21	Carl Bryan Cruz	6	3	0
G	23	Abel Galliguez	0	3	0
G	42	JVee Casio	0	1	2
G	17	Chris Exciminiano	DNP		
G	26	Davon Potts	DNP		
F/C	32	Yutien Andrada	DNP		
F	87	Vic Manuel	DNP		
Head coach:
Alex Compton

== Rosters ==
Magnolia Hotshots Pambansang Manok roster
Players
Coaches

Pos.	#	POB	Name	Height	Weight	DOB (YYYY–MM–DD)	From
G	2	(Philippines)	Justin Melton	5 ft 11 in (1.80 m)	163 lb (74 kg)	1987–04–07	Mount Olive
G	3	(Philippines)	Paul Lee	6 ft 0 in (1.83 m)	200 lb (91 kg)	1989–02–14	UE
F/C	4	(United States)	Rafi Reavis (C)	6 ft 8 in (2.03 m)	210 lb (95 kg)	1977–07–26	Coppin State
G	6	(Philippines)	Jio Jalalon	5 ft 9 in (1.75 m)	150 lb (68 kg)	1992–08–02	Arellano
G	8	(Philippines)	Peter June Simon	6 ft 0 in (1.83 m)	180 lb (82 kg)	1980–06–01	Mindanao
G/F	9	(United States)	Robbie Herndon (R)	6 ft 3 in (1.91 m)	180 lb (82 kg)	1993–07–16	San Francisco State
F/C	10	(Philippines)	Ian Sangalang	6 ft 7 in (2.01 m)	212 lb (96 kg)	1991–12–20	San Sebastian
G/F	12	(Philippines)	Riego Gamalinda	6 ft 3 in (1.91 m)	184 lb (83 kg)	1986–05–25	San Beda
G/F	13	(Philippines)	Gryann Mendoza	6 ft 1 in (1.85 m)	180 lb (82 kg)	1990–09–09	Far Eastern
G	14	(Philippines)	Mark Barroca	5 ft 10 in (1.78 m)	170 lb (77 kg)	1986–04–25	Far Eastern
F	15	(Philippines)	Marc Pingris (injured)	6 ft 4 in (1.93 m)	210 lb (95 kg)	1981–10–16	PSBA
F	17	(Philippines)	Aldrech Ramos	6 ft 6 in (1.98 m)	190 lb (86 kg)	1988–04–03	Far Eastern
G/F	19	(United States)	Rome dela Rosa	6 ft 3 in (1.91 m)	185 lb (84 kg)	1990–12–11	San Beda
F	24	(United States)	Romeo Travis (I)	6 ft 5 in (1.96 m)	220 lb (100 kg)	1984–12–10	Akron
G	29	(Philippines)	Alvin Abundo	5 ft 8 in (1.73 m)	150 lb (68 kg)	1992–10–29	Centro Escolar
F/C	32	(United States)	Kyle Pascual	6 ft 6 in (1.98 m)	210 lb (95 kg)	1990–04–13	San Beda
F/C	91	(Philippines)	Rodney Brondial	6 ft 5 in (1.96 m)	210 lb (95 kg)	1990–11–20	Adamson

Head coach

- (Philippines) Chito Victolero

Assistant coach(es)

- (Philippines) Jason Webb (1st Assistant)
- (Philippines) Johnny Abarrientos
- (Philippines) Mon Jose
- (Philippines) Angelito Esguerra
- (Philippines) Tony Boy Espinosa
- (Philippines) Juno Sauler
- (Philippines) Paul Sorongon

Team manager

- (Philippines) Alvin Patrimonio

Legend

- (C) Team captain
- (CI) Commissioner's Cup Import
- (GI) Governors' Cup Import
- (EI) EASL Import
- (DP) Unsigned draft pick
- (FA) Free agent
- (IN) Inactive
- (S) Suspended
- (R) Rookie
- Injured

Roster

Alaska Aces roster
Players
Coaches

Pos.	#	POB	Name	Height	Weight	DOB (YYYY–MM–DD)	From
G	0	(United States)	Simon Enciso	5 ft 11 in (1.80 m)	185 lb (84 kg)	1991–02–12	Notre Dame de Namur
G	4	(United States)	Chris Banchero	6 ft 1 in (1.85 m)	175 lb (79 kg)	1989–01–24	Seattle Pacific
C	7	(Papua New Guinea)	Sonny Thoss	6 ft 7 in (2.01 m)	205 lb (93 kg)	1981–12–07	James Cook
F/C	9	(Philippines)	Nonoy Baclao	6 ft 5 in (1.96 m)	190 lb (86 kg)	1987–06–15	Ateneo
F/C	10	(Philippines)	Marion Magat	6 ft 7 in (2.01 m)	180 lb (82 kg)	1989–10–22	National-U
F	11	(Philippines)	Jake Pascual	6 ft 4 in (1.93 m)	200 lb (91 kg)	1988–11–11	San Beda
G/F	12	(Philippines)	Jeron Teng (R)	6 ft 3 in (1.91 m)	185 lb (84 kg)	1994–03–21	De La Salle
G/F	13	(Philippines)	Ronald Pascual (IN)	6 ft 3 in (1.91 m)	190 lb (86 kg)	1988–06–23	San Sebastian
G	17	(Philippines)	Chris Exciminiano	6 ft 0 in (1.83 m)	185 lb (84 kg)	1988–11–17	Far Eastern
F	21	(Philippines)	Carl Bryan Cruz	6 ft 3 in (1.91 m)	179 lb (81 kg)	1991–08–21	Far Eastern
G	23	(United States)	Abel Galliguez	5 ft 9 in (1.75 m)	175 lb (79 kg)	1990–04–14	John Brown
G	26	(United States)	Davon Potts (R)	6 ft 2 in (1.88 m)	166 lb (75 kg)	1992–12–27	San Beda
F/C	32	(Philippines)	Yutien Andrada	6 ft 5 in (1.96 m)	203 lb (92 kg)	1990–11–18	De La Salle
G	42	(Philippines)	JVee Casio (C)	5 ft 10 in (1.78 m)	175 lb (79 kg)	1986–09–01	De La Salle
F	52	(United States)	Mike Harris (I)	6 ft 6 in (1.98 m)	235 lb (107 kg)	1983–06–15	Rice
G/F	61	(Philippines)	Kevin Racal	6 ft 3 in (1.91 m)	175 lb (79 kg)	1991–05–16	Letran
F	87	(Philippines)	Vic Manuel	6 ft 4 in (1.93 m)	201 lb (91 kg)	1987–06–18	PSBA

Head coach

- (Philippines) Alex Compton

Assistant coach(es)

- (United States) Jeffrey Cariaso (1st Assistant)
- (Philippines) Eric Altamirano
- (Philippines) Franco Atienza
- (United States) Tony dela Cruz
- (Philippines) Monch Gavieres
- (Philippines) Danny Ildefonso
- (United States) Sean Chambers (Consultant)

Team manager

- (Philippines) Dickie Bachmann^{[a]}

Legend

- (C) Team captain
- (CI) Commissioner's Cup Import
- (GI) Governors' Cup Import
- (EI) EASL Import
- (DP) Unsigned draft pick
- (FA) Free agent
- (IN) Inactive
- (S) Suspended
- (R) Rookie
- Injured

Roster

- ^{a} also serves as Alaska's board governor.

== Broadcast notes ==
The Governors' Finals is aired on The 5 Network (TV5) with simulcasts on PBA Rush (both in standard and high definition). TV5's radio arm, Radyo5 provides the radio play-by-play coverage.

Sports5 also provide online livestreaming via their official YouTube and Facebook accounts using the TV5 feed.

The PBA Rush broadcast will provide English-language coverage of the Finals.

Game	Sports5			PBA Rush (English)		
Game	Play-by-play	Analyst(s)	Courtside reporters	Play-by-play	Analyst(s)	Courtside reporters
Game 1	Magoo Marjon	Ryan Gregorio and Andy Jao	Carla Lizardo	Carlo Pamintuan	Ali Peek	Denise Tan
Game 2	Sev Sarmenta	Quinito Henson and Norman Black	Apple David	Carlo Pamintuan	Dominic Uy	Denise Tan
Game 3	Chuck Araneta	Ryan Gregorio and Andy Jao	Selina Dagdag	Carlo Paminuan	Norman Black	Denise Tan
Game 4	Magoo Marjon	Quinito Henson and Dominic Uy	Denise Tan	Chiqui Reyes	Jong Uichico	Paolo de Rosario
Game 5	Charlie Cuna	Dominic Uy and Richard del Rosario	Carla Lizardo	Carlo Pamintuan	Jong Uichico	Denise Tan
Game 6	Charlie Cuna	Dominic Uy and Ryan Gregorio	Apple David	Jutt Sulit	Josh Reyes	Bea Escurdero

- Additional Game 6 crew:
  - Trophy presentation: Chuck Araneta
  - Dugout celebration interviewer: Denise Tan
