= Robbie Herndon =

Filipino-American basketball player

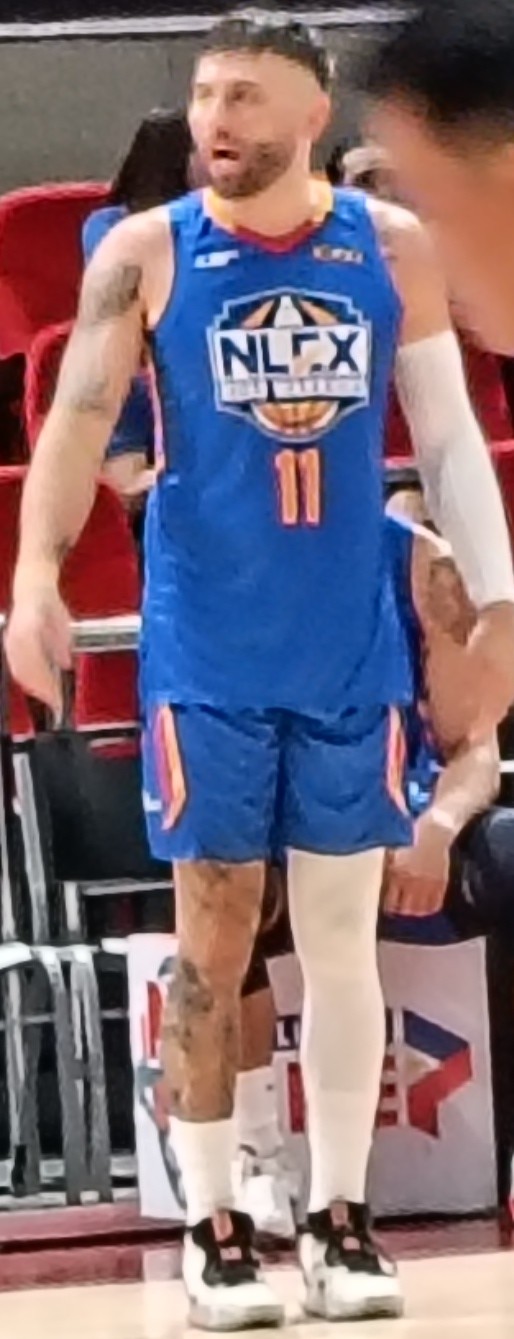
- Herndon in 2025

No. 11 – NLEX Road Warriors
- Position: Small forward / shooting guard
- League: PBA

Personal information
- Born: July 16, 1993 (age 33) Vallejo, California, U.S.
- Listed height: 6 ft 3 in (1.91 m)
- Listed weight: 180 lb (82 kg)

Career information
- High school: St. Patrick-St. Vincent (Vallejo, California)
- College: San Francisco State (2011–2013)
- PBA draft: 2017: 1st round, 6th overall pick
- Drafted by: GlobalPort Batang Pier
- Playing career: 2017–present

Career history
- 2017–2019: Magnolia Hotshots
- 2019–2022: Alaska Aces
- 2022–2023: San Miguel Beermen
- 2023–present: NLEX Road Warriors

Career highlights
- 2× PBA champion (2018 Governors', 2022 Philippine); PBA All-Rookie Team (2018)

Robert Conrad Dixon Herndon Jr. (born July 16, 1993) is a Filipino-American professional basketball player for the NLEX Road Warriors of the Philippine Basketball Association (PBA). The GlobalPort Batang Pier selected him as the sixth overall pick in the 2017 PBA draft.

== High school career ==
Herndon was a three-year varsity player. In his senior year, he scored 17 points in the third quarter to lead his team to a win over Arcata. He then had a game-winning layup against Sacred Heart Prep. He averaged 20.2 points,11.2 rebounds, and 1.8 steals that year. His head coach, Derek Walker called him "the best basketball player to come through St. Patrick's".

Herndon chose to play for the San Francisco State Gators, as it would allow his mother to watch his games. He was also recruited by San Beda, a Filipino university, and Utah, an NCAA Division I Pac-12 university.

Aside from basketball, Herndon was also a high school football athlete. He had 10 touchdowns and nearly 800 receiving yards in his senior season.

== College career ==
Herndon only played two years with San Francisco State. He got his season high of 17 points to go with a team-high five rebounds, two assists, and two steals in a win over Cal State Dominguez Hills.

In his final year with SF State, Herndon tied his college career-high of 21 points to go with six rebounds in 46 minutes as they lost in triple overtime to Dominican. Later that season, he had 14 points, four rebounds, and two steals in a win over Cal State Monterey Bay. He helped them reach the CCAA semifinals where they lost to Cal Poly Pomona. After that season, he stopped playing basketball and focused on his studies. He graduated as a criminal justice major.

=== College statistics ===
Legend
GP	Games played	MPG	Minutes per game
FG%	Field-goal percentage	3P%	3-point field-goal percentage	FT%	Free-throw percentage
RPG	Rebounds per game	APG	Assists per game	SPG	Steals per game
BPG	Blocks per game	PPG	Points per game	**Bold**	Career high

Year	Team	GP	MPG	FG%	3P%	FT%	RPG	APG	SPG	BPG	PPG
2011–12	SFSU	**26**	17.3	**.410**	**.413**	**.740**	**3.0**	.9	**.8**	**.2**	5.8
2012–13	SFSU	22	**21.8**	.344	.203	.719	2.8	.9	.5	.0	**6.5**
Career		48	19.4	.372	.291	.732	2.9	.9	.7	.1	6.2

== Amateur career ==
When Herndon stopped playing basketball, he considered becoming a fireman. After getting his degree, he decided to try basketball once again and moved from California to Manila. In 2016, he won first place in the Manila Red Bull King of the Rock qualifier, beating out retired former PBA MVP Willie Miller. However, he opted to focus on pursuing a basketball career in the PBA, and Miller took his place in the tournament.

Herndon then entered the PBA D-League, where he joined Victoria's Sports – MLQU for the 2017 Aspirants' Cup. In his first game, he had 19 points and 10 rebounds in a loss to the Wang's Basketball Couriers. He then scored 27 points and 11 rebounds in a loss to the Batangas EAC Generals. He led the team with 27 points on 24 shot attempts, 11 rebounds, and six assists as they started the season 0–4. They got their first win of the season against the JRU Heavy Bombers, with him leading with 22 points. Victoria's Sports ended the conference with a win over the Blustar Detergent Dragons Malaysia, in which he had a double-double of 19 points and 13 rebounds. That conference, he averaged 18.6 points, 8.6 rebounds, 3.8 assists and 1.8 steals.

For the 2017 Foundation Cup, Herndon joined the Wang's Basketball Couriers. In a game against Batangas, he had 27 points, 14 rebounds, and a clutch three-pointer that could have sent the game into overtime. However, Batangas' Cedric de Joya converted the game-winning floater. Against the Gamboa Coffee Lovers, he scored 27 points once again as Wang's evened its record to 2–2. He then had a double-double of 17 points and 13 boards as the Couriers continued their franchise-best start. Despite the franchise-best start, Wang's failed to make it to the playoffs, and he was released from Wang's and signed by the Marinerong Pilipino Skippers. In his debut for the Skippers, he had 16 points and 10 rebounds as they forced a do-or-die Game 2 in the quarterfinals. In that Game 2, he had two clutch offensive rebounds to bring his total to 13 boards to go along with his 13 points and two steals as the Skippers moved on the semifinals. In the semifinals, they lost to the Cignal HD Hawkeyes via sweep.

== Professional career ==
=== Magnolia Hotshots (2017–2019) ===
Herndon was then drafted sixth overall in the first round of the 2017 PBA draft by the GlobalPort Batang Pier. On November 3, 2017, before playing a game with the team, Herndon was traded along with fellow rookie Gian Abrigo to the Magnolia Hotshots for Lervin Flores, Joseph Gabayni, and Julian Sargent, who are also all rookies. He was signed to a two-year contract.

Days before the start of the 2017–18 season, Herndon got injured with back spasms and was doubtful to play in the season opener. His father surprised him and flew to Manila to watch him play, motivating him to debut in a win over Alaska with nine points and seven rebounds. He then had 14 points in a 47-point win over the Kia Picanto. In Game 1 of the 2017–18 Philippine Cup Finals, he had two clutch triples that helped Magnolia get the early series lead. Magnolia went on to lose in the Philippine Cup Finals to SMB, but they won the 2018 Governors' Cup, giving him his first PBA championship. He was also selected to the All-Rookie Team that season.

To begin the 2019 season, Herndon scored a career-high 16 points as he stepped up for the injured Paul Lee, but his efforts were not enough as they lost to the TNT Katropa. He got to play in the Rookies/Sophomores vs. Juniors game during the 2019 All-Star Weekend, contributing 16 points, five rebounds, and two assists to the winning side. In Game 2 of their playoff series against Barangay Ginebra, he scored 14 of his 18 points in the second half and collected five rebounds throughout the game as they routed Ginebra to set up a deciding Game 3. Magnolia was able to get past Ginebra, but they lost to SMB in the Finals in seven games.

=== Alaska Aces (2019–2022) ===
On November 3, 2019, Herndon, along with Rodney Brondial, was traded to the Alaska Aces for Chris Banchero.

In Alaska's opening game of the 2020 PBA Season, Herndon contributed 16 points in a loss to TNT. He then had 21 points in a 38-point blowout of the Blackwater Elite. He contributed 13 points, four assists, and two steals as Alaska qualified for the playoffs. In Alaska's final game of the elimination round, he produced 14 points and seven rebounds against the NLEX Road Warriors as they finished with a record of 7–4. They lost to TNT in the quarterfinals.

After starting the 2021 Philippine Cup 0–2, the Aces got their first win of the season against the Phoenix Super LPG Fuel Masters, with him contributing 13 points. He then had 15 in a loss to Terrafirma. The Aces did not qualify for the playoffs that conference. Alaska then started the Governors' Cup with a win over the NorthPort Batang Pier as he scored 13 points and the go-ahead jumper with 30.1 seconds remaining. A day after it was announced that this season would be Alaska's last, he had nine points and a PBA career-high 14 rebounds in a win over the Rain or Shine Elasto Painters. Later that season, he contributed 17 points on five triples in a loss to Phoenix. Alaska ended its final season in a quarterfinal loss to NLEX.

=== San Miguel Beermen (2022–2023) ===
On June 6, 2022, Herndon signed a one-year deal with the Converge FiberXers, the new team that took over the defunct Alaska Aces franchise. Shortly thereafter, he was traded to the San Miguel Beermen for the team's 2023 and 2024 second-round draft picks. He tied his PBA career-high of 21 points with five triples in a win over the Batang Pier. He missed two games due to health protocols. After not playing in the first two games of the 2022 Philippine Cup Finals against TNT, he got the chance to play in the fourth quarter of Game 3, as Beermen stars CJ Perez and Marcio Lassiter had fouled out of the game. He had a clutch triple, but a costly technical from him allowed TNT to send the game into overtime. He then scored the first five points of the OT period that allowed San Miguel to gain control of the series. SMB won the Finals in Game 7. In the Commissioner's Cup, he had 11 points and six rebounds in 30 minutes as he stepped up for the injured Chris Ross in a win over the Batang Pier.

=== NLEX Road Warriors (2023–present) ===
On July 11, 2023, Herndon signed a two-year contract with the NLEX Road Warriors.

== PBA career statistics ==
Legend
GP	Games played	MPG	Minutes per game	FG%	Field-goal percentage
3FG%	3-point field-goal percentage	4P%	4-point field-goal percentage	FT%	Free-throw percentage
RPG	Rebounds per game	APG	Assists per game	SPG	Steals per game
BPG	Blocks per game	PPG	Points per game	127	Career high

As of the end of 2024–25 season

=== Season-by-season averages ===
Year	Team	GP	MPG	FG%	3P%	4P%	FT%	RPG	APG	SPG	BPG	PPG
2017–18	Magnolia	50	10.1	.466	.368	—	.696	2.4	.4	.5	.1	3.5
2019	Magnolia	46	12.6	.420	.324	—	.471	2.9	.4	.5	—	4.3
2019	Alaska	46	12.6	.420	.324	—	.471	2.9	.4	.5	—	4.3
2020	Alaska	12	26.7	.450	.373	—	.667	5.0	2.3	1.1	.1	12.5
2021	Alaska	19	21.7	.381	.333	—	.618	4.3	1.1	.6	.1	9.1
2022–23	San Miguel	33	10.0	.412	.329	—	.545	1.8	.4	.2	.1	3.7
2023–24	NLEX	22	21.3	.405	.406	—	.517	4.0	1.7	.4	—	8.6
2024–25	NLEX	33	16.3	.404	.437	.074	.714	2.9	.5	.5	.0	6.8
Career		215	14.7	.418	.372	.074	.608	3.0	.7	.5	.0	5.7

== Personal life ==
Herndon's father Robert Sr. is three-fourths Filipino who traces his roots to Mactan, Cebu. His father is a police officer in Vallejo, California, and member of the SWAT team, while his mother is a real estate agent. His grandfather is half-Filipino and his grandmother is Filipina.

Herndon is friends with former PBA import Marqus Blakely. He has also played pick-up basketball games with boxer and former senator Manny Pacquiao. Pacquiao was the one who convinced Herndon's agent that he could play in the PBA. He is also friends with Fil-Am PBA player Mikey Williams. Herndon defended Williams after he was seen at SMB's championship party as William's team TNT had just lost to SMB.

Herndon has cited Kobe Bryant as his influence growing up.
