= Rome dela Rosa =

Filipino basketball player (born 1990)

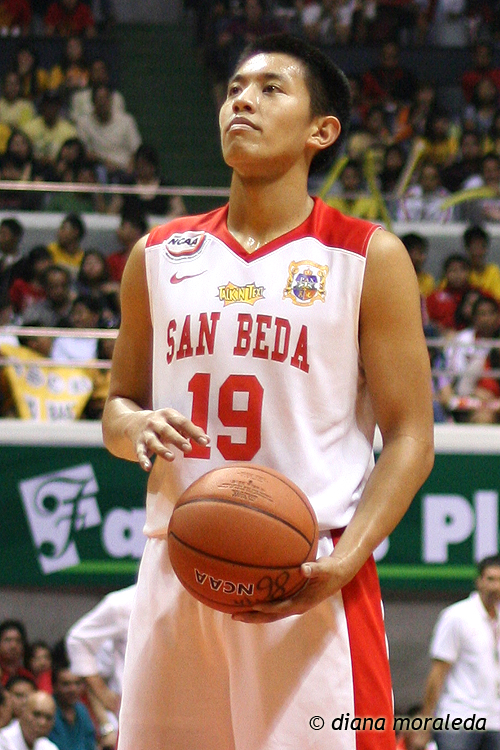
- Dela Rosa with the San Beda Red Lions in 2010

No. 19 – Magnolia Chicken Timplados Hotshots
- Position: Small forward
- League: PBA

Personal information
- Born: December 11, 1990 (age 35) San Diego, California, U.S.
- Listed height: 6 ft 3 in (1.91 m)
- Listed weight: 185 lb (84 kg)

Career information
- High school: Samuel Morse (San Diego, California)
- College: San Beda
- PBA draft: 2014: 2nd round, 13th overall pick
- Drafted by: Alaska Aces
- Playing career: 2014–present

Career history
- 2014–2016: Alaska Aces
- 2016–present: Magnolia Chicken Timplados Hotshots

Career highlights
- PBA champion (2018 Governors'); PBA All-Defensive Team (2018); 4× NCAA Philippines champion (2010–2013)

Rome Adler de Leon dela Rosa (born December 11, 1990) is a Filipino-American professional basketball player for the Magnolia Chicken Timplados Hotshots of the Philippine Basketball Association (PBA).

== Early life ==
Dela Rosa grew up in San Diego, California and his favorite sport was originally baseball, where he played as third-baseman and at times catcher. But after years of regularly watching his father play, basketball eventually became his sport of choice. The skills he learned with baseball helped him become a solid defender.

== College and amateur career ==
Dela Rosa played collegiate basketball at San Beda College, where he was a vital cog to four straight NCAA titles for the Red Lions. While in the amateur ranks, he also suited up for the PC Gilmore Wizards and the NLEX Road Warriors in the PBA D-League.

== Professional career ==
=== Alaska Aces (2014–2016) ===
After he played out his college eligibility in 2013, Dela Rosa was drafted in the second round, 13th overall by the Alaska Aces in the 2014 PBA draft. He spent the first two conferences mostly on the bench, acting as a third-stringer to skipper Tony dela Cruz and Calvin Abueva. In the third conference, he was thrust into the starting lineup due to injuries to some players. He started in all 9 games in the Governors’ Cup while seeing a big increase in his minutes (17.7/game). He also doubled his rebounding average to 2.5 RPG and almost tripled his scoring to 4.5 PPG, from less than 1.4 PPG in the first two conferences. On July 5, 2015, in Alaska's series-clinching 82–77 win over the Star Hotshots, he played the best game of his young career, as he scored 11 points on 4-for-5 shooting in 31:45 minutes of action.

For the 2015–16 season, the Aces made back-to-back finals appearances, but lost each time. Dela Rosa stayed for one more conference with Alaska, the 2016–17 Philippine Cup, but wasn't able to play due to a quadriceps injury before being traded.

=== Star Hotshots (2016–present) ===
On December 9, 2016, Dela Rosa was traded by the Alaska Aces to the Star Hotshots in exchange for Jake Pascual. He made his debut in a win over Rain or Shine.

==== 2017–18 season ====
In a 2017–18 Philippine Cup win over the NLEX Road Warriors, Dela Rosa had what was then his career-high 14 points with crucial baskets in the fourth quarter. He then scored 17 points on 9-of-10 free throw shooting in a win over the Phoenix Fuel Masters. Against the Rain or Shine Elasto Painters, he scored 15 points. He set a new career-high once again in a win over the Globalport Batang Pier with 18 points on on 8-of-11 shooting, along with four rebounds, two steals and an assist. That conference, they made the finals against the San Miguel Beermen. In a Game 1 win, he contributed 11 points with two three-pointers. He then had 15 points and nine rebounds in a Game 4 loss. In Game 5, he scored a career-high 19 points and seven rebounds, but Magnolia lost in double overtime. In that finals series, he averaged 11.9 points per game.

In a win over the Batang Pier during the Commissioner's Cup, Dela Rosa scored 14 points on 6-of-8 shooting from the field. He then scored 19 points by making all six of his shots from the field along with four rebounds, but went 3-of-7 from the free throw line as they lost to Rain or Shine. That conference, they lost to Alaska in the quarterfinals.

Magnolia started the 2018 Governors' Cup with two straight wins, with Dela Rosa providing 17 points in a win over the Batang Pier. During the playoffs, in which they defeated the Blackwater Elite in the first round, he signed a three-year deal to stay with Magnolia. Magnolia made it all the way to the finals, where they won in six games over his former team Alaska. He became the third in his family to win a PBA championship, with his father winning in 1990 and his uncle winning in 1997. That season, he also made the All-Defensive team.

==== 2019 season ====
In a win over the Columbian Dyip during the 2019 Philippine Cup, Dela Rosa contributed 12 points and seven rebounds. He then led the team with a conference-high 17 points in a win over Blackwater. In their semis against Rain or Shine, he hit a crucial three-pointer in the last 3:30 of the game that helped Magnolia seize momentum and win Game 7. With the win, they rematched against San Miguel in the finals. Once again, San Miguel won the Philippine Cup in seven games.

In a "Manila Clasico" against Barangay Ginebra, Dela Rosa led the team with 18 points but they still lost their third straight, slipping to 3–4 in the Governors' Cup. They stopped their losing streak against the Dyip, with him contributing 16 points. In that conference, they lost to the TNT Katropa in the first round of the playoffs.

==== 2020 season ====
During the 2020 season, Magnolia and Dela Rosa won a Manila Clasico, with him contributing 13 points in the win. They won three straight games during that season. However, they lost in the first round once again, this time to Phoenix.

==== 2021 season ====
Dela Rosa got to display his two-way play in a win over Alaska during the Philippine Cup, scoring 12 points on four three-pointers, and making a crucial steal in the final 20.6 seconds of the game that to Ian Sangalang's game-winning basket. In Game 6 of their semis against the Meralco Bolts, he scored 16 points and made five three-pointers, sending Magnolia back to the finals. Although they lost in five game to TNT in that series, he was still rewarded with a new three-year deal.

At the start of the Governors' Cup, Dela Rosa missed its first two weeks due to a hamstring injury. Although he was able to return during the playoffs, the injury limited his production, and Magnolia lost to Meralco in five games.

==== 2022–23 season ====
Magnolia started the 2022 Philippine Cup with losses to the Converge FiberXers and TNT. In their third game, against the Batang Pier, Dela Rosa struggled as he couldn't make a single field goal in seven attempts. With 10 seconds left and the game tied 77-all, he scored his first and only three-pointer of the game, getting Magnolia its first win of the season. Against Ginebra, he made a clutch three-pointer that gave Ginebra its first loss of the season. He then dislocated one of his right fingers before getting hit in the head and requiring several stitches. He also suffered an elbow injury that made him sit out a game. During the playoffs, he returned and helped Magnolia get to the semis by beating NLEX.

During the Commissioner's Cup, Dela Rosa missed two games due to typhoid fever. In a Governors' Cup win over the Batang Pier, he scored a season-high 19 points with three triples. He then scored 14 points in a win over Blackwater.

==== 2023–24 season ====
In Game 6 of the 2024 Commissioner's Cup finals, Dela Rosa committed a five-second violation in the fourth quarter that led to San Miguel beating Magnolia once again. During the Philippine Cup, he missed six games due to an ankle injury.

== Career statistics ==
Legend
GP	Games played	MPG	Minutes per game	FG%	Field-goal percentage
3FG%	3-point field-goal percentage	4P%	4-point field-goal percentage	FT%	Free-throw percentage
RPG	Rebounds per game	APG	Assists per game	SPG	Steals per game
BPG	Blocks per game	PPG	Points per game	127	Career high

=== PBA ===
As of the end of 2025–26 season

==== Season-by-season averages ====
Year	Team	GP	MPG	FG%	3P%	4P%	FT%	RPG	APG	SPG	BPG	PPG
2014–15	Alaska	41	12.0	.526	.250	—	.667	1.6	.5	.4	.0	2.9
2015–16	Alaska	49	10.2	.452	.353	—	.750	1.4	.6	.3	.0	2.5
2016–17	Star	38	11.6	.414	.217	—	.583	1.3	.3	.3	—	2.9
2017–18	Magnolia	57	25.6	.495	.426	—	.720	3.4	1.0	.7	.1	7.4
2019	Magnolia	53	23.8	.468	.346	—	.750	3.0	1.1	.7	.1	6.2
2020	Magnolia	11	22.2	.471	.414	—	.909	2.6	1.0	.8	.1	8.0
2021	Magnolia	35	25.6	.451	.423	—	.763	3.3	.8	.7	—	6.2
2022–23	Magnolia	45	24.0	.376	.310	—	.765	2.4	.7	.5	.1	4.9
2023–24	Magnolia	28	20.9	.400	.275	—	.667	2.2	.9	.7	—	4.1
2024–25	Magnolia	41	21.7	.417	.333	.500	.846	2.4	1.1	.3	.0	5.3
2025–26	Magnolia	38	24.1	.450	.349	—	.825	2.8	1.0	.5	.1	6.3
Career		436	16.8	.448	.352	.500	.750	2.4	.8	.5	.0	5.1

=== College ===
Year	Team	GP	MPG	FG%	3P%	FT%	RPG	APG	SPG	BPG	PPG
2009–10	San Beda	21	19.3	.449	.181	.726	2.6	2.0	.3	.0	8.1
2010–11	San Beda	17	27.3	.525	.000	.747	3.7	2.2	.5	.2	11.4
2011–12	San Beda	17	22.1	.509	.357	.870	2.0	2.0	.7	.0	9.2
2012–13	San Beda	21	28.1	.504	.350	.714	3.7	1.1	.4	.1	7.7
2013–14	San Beda	13	28.6	.546	.000	.618	2.4	1.8	.6	.1	9.2
Career		89	24.8	.503	.222	.740	2.9	1.4	.4	.1	9.0

== Personal life ==
Dela Rosa is the son of former PBA player Romy dela Rosa, who played in ten seasons with Shell, Sta. Lucia, and the Negros Slashers in the defunct MBA. He is also the nephew of Ruben dela Rosa, also a PBA and MBA player, who was a teammate of former Alaska coach Alex Compton during his time with the Manila Metrostars. His younger brother Ry was drafted by Magnolia during the Season 49 draft.
