= Romeo Travis =

American basketball player (born 1984)

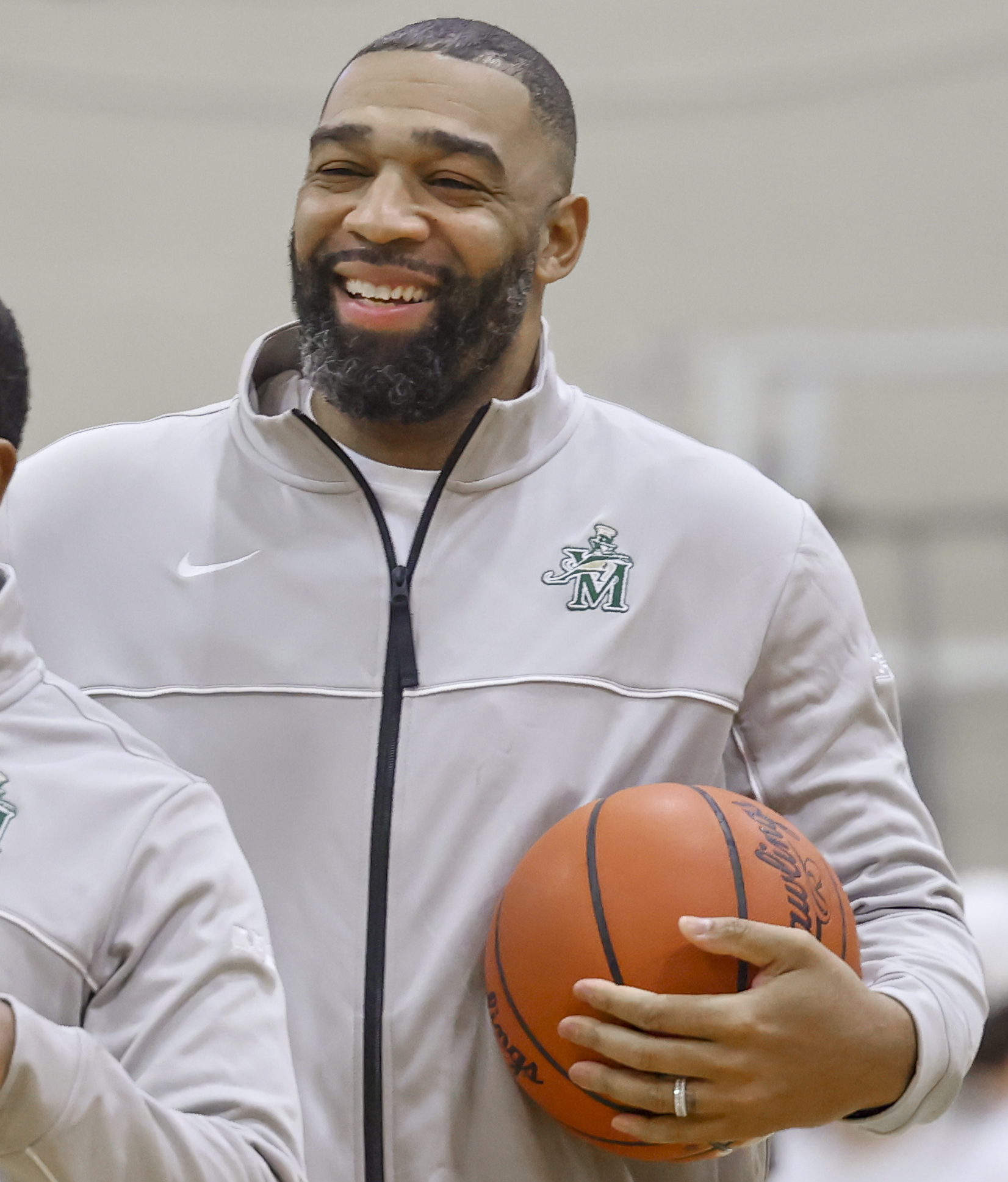
- Travis as a coach with St. Vincent–St. Mary High School in 2022

Personal information
- Born: December 10, 1984 (age 41) Akron, Ohio, U.S.
- Listed height: 6 ft 7 in (2.01 m)
- Listed weight: 233 lb (106 kg)

Career information
- High school: St. Vincent–St. Mary (Akron, Ohio)
- College: Akron (2003–2007)
- NBA draft: 2007: undrafted
- Playing career: 2007–2021
- Position: Small forward / power forward
- Number: 24, 9, 19

Career history
- 2007: Cantabria Lobos
- 2007–2008: Ciudad de Huelva
- 2008–2009: ratiopharm Ulm
- 2009–2010: Tigers Tübingen
- 2010–2011: Barak Netanya
- 2011–2012: Hapoel Gilboa Galil
- 2012–2013: Zadar
- 2013–2014: Khimik
- 2014–2015: Krasny Oktyabr
- 2015: Alaska Aces
- 2015: SIG Strasbourg
- 2016: Le Mans
- 2016: Cantù
- 2016–2017: SIG Strasbourg
- 2017–2018: Le Mans
- 2018: Magnolia Hotshots
- 2019: Mono Vampire
- 2019: Magnolia Hotshots
- 2020–2021: Limoges CSP

Career highlights
- PBA champion (2018 Governors'); PBA Best Import of the Conference (2015 Governors'); Pro A champion (2018); Pro A Finals MVP (2018); All-French Pro A First Team (2018); All-French Pro A Second Team (2017); All-French Pro A Third Team (2016); All-French Pro A Imports Team (2018); French Cup winner (2016); All-Croatian League First Team (2013); All-Croatian League Imports Team (2013); Balkan League champion (2012); All-Balkan League First Team (2012); All-Balkan League Forward of the Year (2012); All-Balkan League Imports Team (2012); All-Israeli League Second Team (2011); MAC Player of the Year (2007); 2× First-team All-MAC (2006, 2007)

Romeo Travis (born December 10, 1984) is an American born naturalized Macedonian former professional basketball player. He played college basketball for the University of Akron.

== High school career ==
Travis was born in Akron, Ohio. As a high school standout at Akron's St. Vincent–St. Mary High School, Travis played alongside LeBron James. Travis averaged 17 points and 11 rebounds during his prep career, spanning his sophomore, junior, and senior years. The Irish were OHSAA Division III state champions in his sophomore year, and in his senior year they won the Division II state championship.

== College career ==
After graduation, he stayed in his hometown and went on to become the University of Akron's all-time blocked shots leader (161); he also finished ranked seventh on the career scoring chart (1,491) and ninth in career rebounds (783). In 2006–07, as a senior, he was named an Associated Press All-American and was honored as the Mid-American Conference Player of the Year.

== Professional career ==
On June 30, 2009, Travis signed with German club Walter Tigers Tübingen for the 2009–10 season.

While playing for Hapoel Gilboa Galil Travis was named All-Israeli League Player of the Year, All-Israeli League Forward of the Year, All-Israeli League 1st Team, Israeli League All-Imports Team, All-Balkan League Forward of the Year, All-Balkan League First Team and All-Balkans League All-Imports Team by Eurobasket.com for the 2012 season. Travis was also a member of Israeli Premier League Regular Season Runner-Up and Israeli Premier League All-Star Game for the 2012 season.

In August 2012 Travis signed with KK Zadar of Croatia for the 2012–13 season. While playing for Zadar during the 2012–13 Adriatic league season he was named MVP of the week four times.

In July 2013, Travis signed with Khimik of the Ukrainian Basketball SuperLeague for the 2013–14 season.

On July 25, 2014, he signed with BC Krasny Oktyabr of Russia for the 2014–15 season. On April 13, 2015, he left the Russian club and signed with Alaska Aces of the Philippine Basketball Association (PBA). On July 13, 2015, he was awarded as the Bobby Parks PBA Best Import of the Conference, topping three other candidate imports.

On October 13, 2015, he signed a short-term deal with Strasbourg IG of the French Pro A and EuroLeague. On November 29, 2015, he left Strasbourg after appearing in six league games and six Euroleague games. On December 28, 2015, he signed with Le Mans Sarthe Basket for the rest of the season.

On August 18, 2016, Travis signed with Italian club Pallacanestro Cantù for the 2016–17 season. On November 8, 2016, he parted ways with Cantù after appearing in six games. On the same day he signed with his former club SIG Strasbourg for the rest of the season.

On July 7, 2017, Travis signed with his former team Le Mans Sarthe Basket for the 2017–18 season.

On 2018, Travis signed with Magnolia Hotshots for the 2018 and 2019 PBA Governors' Cup. On November 6, 2018, he recorded a triple-double of 18 points, 20 rebounds, and 12 assists in a 103-99 win over the Blackwater Elite. He scored a career-high 50 points for the Hotshots as they defeat the Barangay Ginebra San Miguel in Game 4 of the 2018 Governors' Cup.

On December 28, 2020, he has signed with Limoges CSP of the LNB Pro A. In his first game with Limoges, he contributed 6 points and 6 rebounds in 20 minutes off the bench. However, they were defeated 68-91 by Le Mans.

=== The Basketball Tournament ===
In 2017, Travis participated in The Basketball Tournament for Ram Nation. The team made it to the Elite 8 before being eliminated by eventual tournament champions Overseas Elite. The Basketball Tournament is an annual $2 million winner-take-all tournament broadcast on ESPN.

== National team ==
Travis was naturalized by the Macedonian Basketball Federation on July 28, 2016 in order to play for the Macedonian national basketball team in the EuroBasket 2017 qualification.
