= Tonyboy Espinosa =

Filipino basketball player and coach

Magnolia Chicken Timplados Hotshots
- Title: Assistant coach
- League: PBA

Personal information
- Born: April 25, 1974 (age 52)
- Listed height: 5 ft 8 in (1.73 m)
- Listed weight: 66 kg (146 lb)

Career information
- College: De La Salle
- PBA draft: 1997: 3rd round, 24th overall pick
- Drafted by: Mobiline Phone Pals
- Playing career: 1997–2006
- Position: Point guard
- Number: 3
- Coaching career: 2015–present

Career history

Playing
- 1997–1999: Mobiline Phone Pals
- 2000–2002: Batangas Blades
- 2004–2005: Purefoods TJ Hotdogs
- 2005–2006: Coca-Cola Tigers

Coaching
- 2015–present: Magnolia Chicken Timplados Hotshots (assistant)
- 2021–2024: Purefoods TJ Titans

Career highlights
- As assistant coach: PBA champion (2018 Governors'); As player: MBA champion (2001); 2x PBA All-Star Buzzer-Beater Contest champion (1997, 1998)

Antonio "Tonyboy" Espinosa (sometimes spelled as Tony Boy) is a Filipino former basketball player and basketball coach who serving as one of the assistant coaches under Chito Victolero of the Magnolia Chicken Timplados Hotshots in the PBA.

== Playing career ==
=== La Salle ===
Espinosa played for De La Salle Green Archers from 1991 to 1995 under Derrick Pumaren, and later with Virgil Villavicencio, and played with future colleague Jason Webb. In the 1991 UAAP Finals, he played against FEU Tamaraws led by another future colleague Johnny Abarrientos. With the Green Archers leading, 76–71, Espinosa was called for his fifth foul on Johnny Abarrientos. But the referees failed to send the La Salle guard out of the game, letting some seconds run down before Adi Papa was sent in as his replacement. La Salle won the game, but the FEU coach Arturo Valenzona protested and eventually claimed the title, because La Salle did not appear on the rematch game after the protest.

=== Professional ===
Espinosa was drafted by Mobiline Cellulars in 1997, and played on the team until 1999. He played with Batangas Blades. He was free agent until 2004, when he was signed by then James Yap-led Purefoods TJ Hotdogs. He also played on Coca-Cola Tigers from 2005 until 2006.

== Coaching career ==
Espinosa was hired in 2015 when Jason Webb was appointed as an assistant coach in Star Hotshots. That time, another former Green Juno Sauler joined the staff. When Webb was demoted, he was retained.

He was assigned as head coach of Purefoods TJ Titans of the PBA 3x3.
