= Alvin Abundo =

Filipino basketball player

No. 29 – Quezon Huskers
- Position: Point guard
- League: MPBL

Personal information
- Born: October 29, 1992 (age 34) Parañaque, Philippines
- Listed height: 5 ft 8 in (1.73 m)
- Listed weight: 150 lb (68 kg)

Career information
- College: CEU
- PBA draft: 2015: 7th round, 51st overall pick
- Drafted by: Blackwater Elite
- Playing career: 2016–present

Career history
- 2016–2020: Star / Magnolia Hotshots
- 2021: San Juan Knights
- 2022: NorthPort Batang Pier
- 2022: San Juan Kings
- 2022–2023: Davao Occidental Tigers
- 2023–present: Quezon Huskers

Career highlights
- PBA champion (2018 Governors'); 3× NAASCU champion (2013, 2014, 2015)

Mon Alvin T. Abundo (born October 29, 1992) is a Filipino professional basketball player for Quezon Huskers of the Maharlika Pilipinas Basketball League (MPBL). He was Blackwater’s seventh-round pick (51st overall) in the 2015 PBA draft, making him one of the lowest-drafted players ever to make it to the PBA.

== College career ==
In 2011, Abundo transferred from Philippine Women's University to Centro Escolar University. In 2012, he was a part of the CEU Scorpions team that went to the NAASCU Finals, where they lost to the St. Clare College-Caloocan Saints. The following year, they joined the National Collegiate Basketball League (NCBL), and won the Founders' Cup tournament. It led up to their performance the following NAASCU season, in which they swept the elimination rounds to go straight to the finals. In a finals rematch against St. Clare, they lost Game 1, but they bounced back in Games 2 and 3 to win CEU its first ever NAASCU men's basketball title. They were able to defend their title the following two seasons.

== Professional career ==
=== Star / Magnolia Hotshots ===
In the 2015 PBA Draft, Abundo was picked by the Blackwater Elite in the seventh round. However, he never got to play for them, as he was cut by the team. He played for the Cafe France Bakers in the PBA D-League.

Abundo then got his chance to play in the PBA when he received an invite to try out for the Star Hotshots in 2016. For three days, he would take bus rides to Manila after playing in ligang labas games in Lucena. His efforts paid off as he was signed by the Hotshots.

At Star, Abundo became a fan-favorite and an important practice player. He participated in the Obstacle Challenge during the 2017 PBA All-Star Week. He scored 14 points in a playoff win over the Meralco Bolts. In 2018, he suffered a partial MCL tear. He was part of the team that won the 2018 Governors' Cup.

In 2021, Abundo was re-signed by the team. Later that year, he was released from the team.

=== San Juan Knights ===
Soon after his release from Magnolia, Abundo joined the San Juan Knights in the inaugural Filbasket season and in the 2021 MPBL Invitational.

=== NorthPort Batang Pier ===
Abundo then made a brief return to the PBA when he signed with the NorthPort Batang Pier.

=== Return to San Juan ===
Abundo played for San Juan during the 2022 MPBL season. 11 games into the season, he was released by the team.

=== Davao Occidental Tigers ===
In 2023, Abundo played for the Davao Occidental Tigers in the Pilipinas Super League.

=== Quezon Huskers ===
Abundo returned to the MPBL by joining the Quezon Huskers during the 2023 season. In a game against the Imus SV Squad, he had 15 points to go with nine assists, five rebounds and two steals. They were eliminated by the Zamboanga Family's Brand Sardines in the playoffs.

== PBA career statistics ==
Legend
GP	Games played	MPG	Minutes per game
FG%	Field-goal percentage	3P%	3-point field-goal percentage	FT%	Free-throw percentage
RPG	Rebounds per game	APG	Assists per game	SPG	Steals per game
BPG	Blocks per game	PPG	Points per game	**Bold**	Career high

As of the end of 2021 season

=== Season-by-season averages ===
Year	Team	GP	MPG	FG%	3P%	FT%	RPG	APG	SPG	BPG	PPG
2016–17	Star / Magnolia	**19**	**5.3**	**.468**	**.423**	.333	.8	.5	**.2**	.0	**3.0**
2017–18	Star / Magnolia	8	4.5	.350	.222	—	**1.0**	.4	.1	.0	2.0
2019	Star / Magnolia	16	4.1	.308	.222	**.500**	.9	.7	.1	.0	1.3
2020	Star / Magnolia	4	4.4	.167	.250	—	.8	**1.0**	.0	.0	.8
2021	NorthPort	3	1.9	—	—	**.500**	**1.0**	.0	.0	.0	.3
Career		50	4.5	.384	.316	.400	.9	.6	.1	.0	2.0

== National team career ==
Abundo was part of the 24-man pool for the 2016 FIBA Asia Challenge.
