= Gryann Mendoza =

Filipino basketball player

Free agent
- Position: Shooting guard

Personal information
- Born: September 9, 1990 (age 36) Davao City, Philippines
- Listed height: 6 ft 1 in (1.85 m)
- Listed weight: 180 lb (82 kg)

Career information
- College: FEU
- PBA draft: 2016: Undrafted
- Playing career: 2016–present

Career history
- 2016–2018: Star / Magnolia Hotshots
- 2020–2023: TNT Tropang Giga
- 2021: KCS Computer Specialist–Mandaue
- 2021–2023: TNT Tropang Giga 3x3
- 2025: Cebu Classic

Career highlights
- 2× PBA champion (2018 Governors', 2021 Philippine); Pilipinas VisMin Super Cup Visayas Leg champion (2021)

Gryann Mendoza (born September 9, 1990) is a Filipino professional basketball player. He last played for the Cebu Classic of the Maharlika Pilipinas Basketball League (MPBL).

== PBA career statistics ==
Legend
GP	Games played	MPG	Minutes per game
FG%	Field-goal percentage	3P%	3-point field-goal percentage	FT%	Free-throw percentage
RPG	Rebounds per game	APG	Assists per game	SPG	Steals per game
BPG	Blocks per game	PPG	Points per game	**Bold**	Career high

As of the end of 2021 season

=== Season-by-season averages ===
Year	Team	GP	MPG	FG%	3P%	FT%	RPG	APG	SPG	BPG	PPG
2016–17	Star	11	**4.6**	**.455**	**.667**	.400	.5	**.4**	.0	.0	2.2
2017–18	Magnolia	**15**	4.1	.395	.267	**.429**	**.7**	**.4**	.0	**.1**	**2.5**
2021	TNT	12	3.7	.364	.222	.250	.3	.3	**.1**	.0	1.6
Career		38	4.1	.402	.296	.375	.5	.4	.0	.0	2.1
