= Jake Pascual =

Filipino basketball player (born 1988)

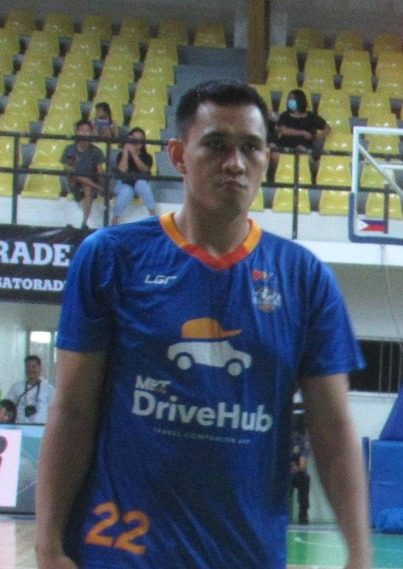
- Pascual in 2023

Free agent
- Position: Power forward

Personal information
- Born: November 11, 1988 (age 38) Ramos, Tarlac, Philippines
- Listed height: 6 ft 4 in (1.93 m)
- Listed weight: 205 lb (93 kg)

Career information
- High school: St. Rose Catholic (Newtown, Connecticut; PCU (Manila)
- College: San Beda
- PBA draft: 2014: 1st round, 8th overall pick
- Drafted by: Barako Bull Energy
- Playing career: 2014–present

Career history
- 2014–2015: Barako Bull Energy
- 2015–2016: Star Hotshots
- 2016–2019: Alaska Aces
- 2020–2022: Phoenix Super LPG Fuel Masters
- 2023–2025: NLEX Road Warriors

Career highlights
- PBA All-Rookie Team (2015); PBA D-League Best Player of the Conference (2013 Foundation); 4× NCAA Philippines champion (2008, 2010–2012); NCAA Philippines Mythical Five (2012); NCAA Philippines Most Improved Player (2009)

Elvin Jake Javier Pascual (born November 11, 1988) is a Filipino professional basketball player who last played for the NLEX Road Warriors of the Philippine Basketball Association (PBA). He was taken 8th overall by Barako Bull in the 2014 PBA draft.

He made history as the first NCAA Juniors player to sweep MVP, Rookie of the Year, Mythical Five, and Most Defensive Player awards in a single season. NCAA Season 82.

== Amateur career ==
Pascual initially attended his high school education at St. Rose Catholic School in Paniqui, Tarlac until 2004, when his brother brought him to Manila and encouraged him to apply for a basketball scholarship with Philippine Christian University. On his own will, he personally came to PCU with the intent to join its seniors basketball team, as he was, at that time, a graduating high school student. Yet, he was advised by Bong Sales, then head coach of the PCU Baby Dolphins, to repeat his third year of high school to gain experience and be familiar with Manila basketball. Furthermore, he was then instructed to officially drop out from his fourth year high school studies in St. Rose Catholic School in Tarlac, and to bring with him his second year high school report card to officially enroll as a third year high school student at PCU. Mr. Sales facilitated his enrolment in PCU High School, enabling him to serve a one-year residency and play for a year with the Baby Dolphins.

In his only playing year at PCU, he was awarded both NCAA Juniors Rookie of the Year and Most Valuable Player of the NCAA Season 82, He made history as the first Juniors player to sweep MVP, Rookie of the Year, Mythical Five, and Most Defensive Player awards in a single season.

After he graduated at PCU, he transferred to San Beda College where he was supposed to play out his rookie season for the Red Lions in 2008, but the NCAA Management Committee (ManCom) decided to ban him due to the same eligibility issue he was involved in two years before. A week after, he was cleared to play for NCAA Season 84 by the league after an appeal by then-San Beda president Fr. Mateo De Jesus to the NCAA Policy Board, saying he did not knowingly violate league rules on misrepresentation.

At San Beda, he became a member of multiple Red Lions championship teams of 2008, 2010, 2011 and 2012. He was also awarded as Most Improved Player in 2009.

He was also a Gilas Cadet, and was invited to the Sinag Pilipinas national team pool that competed in the 2013 SEA Games.

While in the amateur ranks, he was awarded Best Player Of The Conference in the year 2013 as he played for the NLEX until its last season in the PBA Developmental League.

== Professional career ==
On November 16, 2014, Pascual posted a career-high 22 points as he led Barako Bull to its first win against Kia in the 2014–15 PBA Philippine Cup.

On September 28, 2015, he was traded to the Star Hotshots in a six-player, four-team trade.

On December 9, 2016, Pascual was traded to the Alaska Aces in exchange for Rome dela Rosa.

On December 10, 2019, Pascual was traded to the Phoenix Pulse Fuel Masters in exchange for a 2020 second-round draft pick. On February 11, 2022, he signed a two-year contract extension with Phoenix Super LPG (formerly Phoenix Pulse).

On January 18, 2023, Pascual was traded to the NLEX Road Warriors in a three-team trade involving NLEX, Phoenix, and TNT Tropang Giga. He was reunited with NLEX head coach Frankie Lim, who was his college coach at San Beda. On March 1, Pascual signed a two-year extension with the team.

== Career statistics ==
Legend
GP	Games played	MPG	Minutes per game	FG%	Field-goal percentage
3FG%	3-point field-goal percentage	4P%	4-point field-goal percentage	FT%	Free-throw percentage
RPG	Rebounds per game	APG	Assists per game	SPG	Steals per game
BPG	Blocks per game	PPG	Points per game	127	Career high

As of the end of 2024–25 season

=== PBA season-by-season averages ===
Year	Team	GP	MPG	FG%	3P%	4P%	FT%	RPG	APG	SPG	BPG	PPG
2014–15	Barako Bull	36	23.6	.392	—	—	.566	5.2	1.3	.8	.3	6.3
2015–16	Star	27	9.9	.536	—	—	.458	3.3	.4	.2	.2	3.1
2016–17	Star	30	10.3	.488	—	—	.553	2.8	.6	.4	.2	3.3
2016–17	Alaska	30	10.3	.488	—	—	.553	2.8	.6	.4	.2	3.3
2017–18	Alaska	29	9.9	.456	.333	—	.323	3.2	.7	.5	.7	3.2
2019	Alaska	33	14.0	.407	.000	—	.326	3.9	.7	.6	.4	3.9
2021	Phoenix Super LPG	20	12.7	.481	.286	—	.455	3.4	.8	.3	.6	3.1
2022–23	Phoenix Super LPG	30	11.2	.509	.000	—	.667	2.5	.6	.3	.3	1.9
2022–23	NLEX	30	11.2	.509	.000	—	.667	2.5	.6	.3	.3	1.9
2023–24	NLEX	13	8.7	.440	.000	—	.667	2.4	.5	.2	.2	1.8
2024–25	NLEX	2	4.0	—	—	—	—	2.0	—	—	—	—
Career		220	13.2	.442	.208	—	.459	3.5	.7	.4	.3	3.5

=== NCAA ===
Year	Team	GP	MPG	FG%	3P%	FT%	RPG	APG	SPG	BPG	PPG
2008-09	San Beda	18	18.8	.464	.500	.550	5.7	1.0	.7	1.1	5.6
2009-10	San Beda	21	21.8	.402	.000	.724	8.0	2.0	.4	.7	9.1
2010-11	San Beda	17	19.4	.409	.353	.578	6.4	2.6	.4	.9	7.4
2011-12	San Beda	21	22.6	.427	.000	.490	8.2	3.1	.6	1.9	7.2
2012-13	San Beda	21	24.5	.407	.500	.609	8.2	1.1	1.1	1.2	9.5
Career		98	21.6	.417	.273	.601	8.5	2.0	.6	1.2	7.8

== Personal life ==
Pascual was born and raised in Ramos, Tarlac.
