= Jio Jalalon =

Filipino basketball player

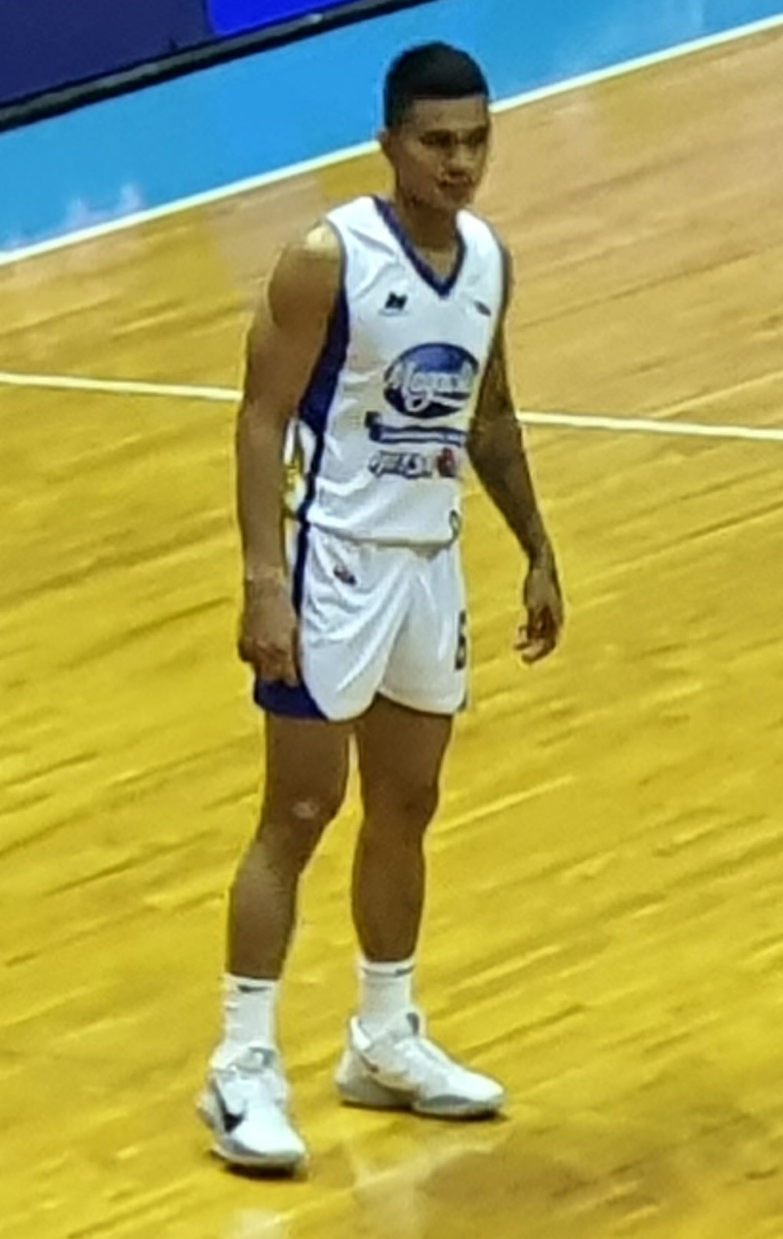
- Jalalon with the Magnolia Hotshots in 2021

No. 28 – TNT Tropang 5G
- Position: Point guard
- League: PBA

Personal information
- Born: August 2, 1992 (age 34) Cagayan de Oro, Philippines
- Listed height: 5 ft 9 in (1.75 m)
- Listed weight: 150 lb (68 kg)

Career information
- High school: Sacred Heart of Jesus Montessori School (Cagayan de Oro)
- College: Arellano (2013–2016)
- PBA draft: 2016: Special draft
- Drafted by: Star Hotshots
- Playing career: 2016–present

Career history
- 2016–2024: Star Hotshots/Magnolia Hotshots Pambansang Manok/Magnolia Pambansang Manok Hotshots/Magnolia Chicken Timplados Hotshots
- 2024–2025: NorthPort Batang Pier
- 2025–present: TNT Tropang 5G

Career highlights
- PBA champion (2018 Governors'); 5× PBA All-Star (2017–2019, 2023, 2024); PBA Defensive Player of the Year (2023); 3× PBA All-Defensive Team (2017, 2021, 2023); PBA All-Rookie Team (2017); PBA Mr. Quality Minutes (2017); NCAA Philippines Most Improved Player (2014); 3× NCAA Philippines Mythical Team (2014–2016)

Jiovani Nacawili Jalalon (born August 2, 1992) is a Filipino professional basketball player for the TNT Tropang 5G of the Philippine Basketball Association (PBA).

== Early life ==
The third of the six children of Vicente Jalalon and Jocelyn Nacawili, Jiovani was born on August 2, 1992, to a poor family in Cagayan de Oro.

His inspiration in playing basketball is the unrealized dreams of his father, whose lack of a proper education and opportunities denied him of a chance of becoming a basketball player himself. Jiovani has a younger brother, Jericho, who also plays basketball.

Jalalon attended the Sacred Heart of Jesus Montessori School in Cagayan de Oro before he went to Manila to pursue a spot in a college varsity team.

== College career ==
Jalalon first played college basketball for Informatics College in the National Athletic Association of Schools, Colleges and Universities (NAASCU), but later transferred to Arellano University to join the Chiefs in the National Collegiate Athletic Association (NCAA).

During his rookie year, he served as the chief backup to the Chiefs' main playmaker John Pinto. Though he was coming off the bench, Jalalon was the Chiefs’ fourth-leading scorer in the Filoil Flying V Premier Cup.

By his sophomore season, he averaged 12.8 points, 5.4 rebounds, 5.8 assists, and 2.8 steals, earning him the Most Improved Player Award and a spot in the NCAA Season 90 Mythical Five. Arellano made its first-ever NCAA Finals appearance, but eventually lost to five-peat champions San Beda Red Lions in two games.

Jalalon improved even more in his third year, making the Mythical Team once again. The Chiefs, however, failed to advance to the Final Four when they lost to the Mapua Cardinals in the playoff game for fourth spot despite Jalalon's 37 points, 7 rebounds, 5 assists, and 5 steals.

In the succeeding season, Arellano made a return to the NCAA Finals but lost once again to San Beda.

Jalalon played extremely well the entire season to clinch his third Mythical Team inclusion. He was the only non-center – and the only local player – to be part of the elite list. Mapua's Allwell Oraeme was named the league's Most Valuable Player (MVP), after accumulating 65.12 points in player all-around value (PAV) to beat Jalalon, who had 57.50 PAV.

The situation prompted the NCAA management to review the way individual awards are to be determined in the future, as many felt that there should have been a separate award for best import, so as to award the MVP to the best local player.

Even before he wrapped up his collegiate career, Jalalon had earned the reputation as the best point guard in Philippine college basketball. His style of play had also drawn comparison to that of PBA veteran, national player, and superstar point guard Jayson Castro.

== Amateur career ==
Jalalon also played in the PBA Developmental League (PBA D-League) during the NCAA offseason. In the league's 2015 Foundation Cup, Jalalon suited up for KeraMix. He joined the Caida Tile Masters during the 2016 PBA D-League Aspirants' Cup.

== Professional career ==
On October 30, 2016, Jalalon was picked by the Star Hotshots in the 2016 PBA draft.

He had an impressive PBA debut, putting up 11 points, five boards, one assist, and one steal in almost 22 minutes off the bench in the Hotshots’ 88–96 loss to San Miguel Beermen. The next game, Jalalon also puts up an impressive statline of numbers as he recorded 13 points, 6 rebounds, 5 assists and 1 steal in 27 minutes of playing time in a loss to the GlobalPort Batang Pier. In his third game, Jalalon have another impressive statline as he recorded 17 points, 5 rebounds and 5 steals in at least 24 minutes of playing time in a 99–75 win over the NLEX Road Warriors.

On October 4, 2025, Jalalon signed with the TNT Tropang 5G.

== PBA career statistics ==
Legend
GP	Games played	MPG	Minutes per game	FG%	Field-goal percentage
3FG%	3-point field-goal percentage	4P%	4-point field-goal percentage	FT%	Free-throw percentage
RPG	Rebounds per game	APG	Assists per game	SPG	Steals per game
BPG	Blocks per game	PPG	Points per game	127	Career high

As of the end of 2024–25 season

=== Season-by-season averages ===
Year	Team	GP	MPG	FG%	3P%	4P%	FT%	RPG	APG	SPG	BPG	PPG
2016–17	Star	48	22.2	.425	.327	—	.721	4.3	3.1	1.2	.0	9.2
2017–18	Magnolia	54	23.8	.380	.234	—	.641	4.7	5.0	1.7	.0	8.4
2019	Magnolia	52	25.3	.377	.281	—	.732	4.9	4.4	1.7	.1	9.9
2020	Magnolia	12	23.2	.417	.286	—	.765	4.2	3.3	1.4	.1	8.6
2021	Magnolia	40	23.3	.423	.286	—	.691	3.9	5.2	1.2	—	8.4
2022–23	Magnolia	49	27.6	.419	.326	—	.755	5.3	5.8	2.1	—	11.1
2023–24	Magnolia	32	25.0	.412	.246	—	.684	5.0	5.1	1.7	.0	9.7
2024–25	NorthPort	20	21.6	.401	.326	.000	.833	3.6	4.7	1.4	—	7.7
Career		307	24.3	.404	.285	.000	.715	4.6	4.7	1.6	.0	9.3

== See also ==
- Philippines–Australia basketball brawl
