= Ian Sangalang =

Filipino basketball player (born 1991)

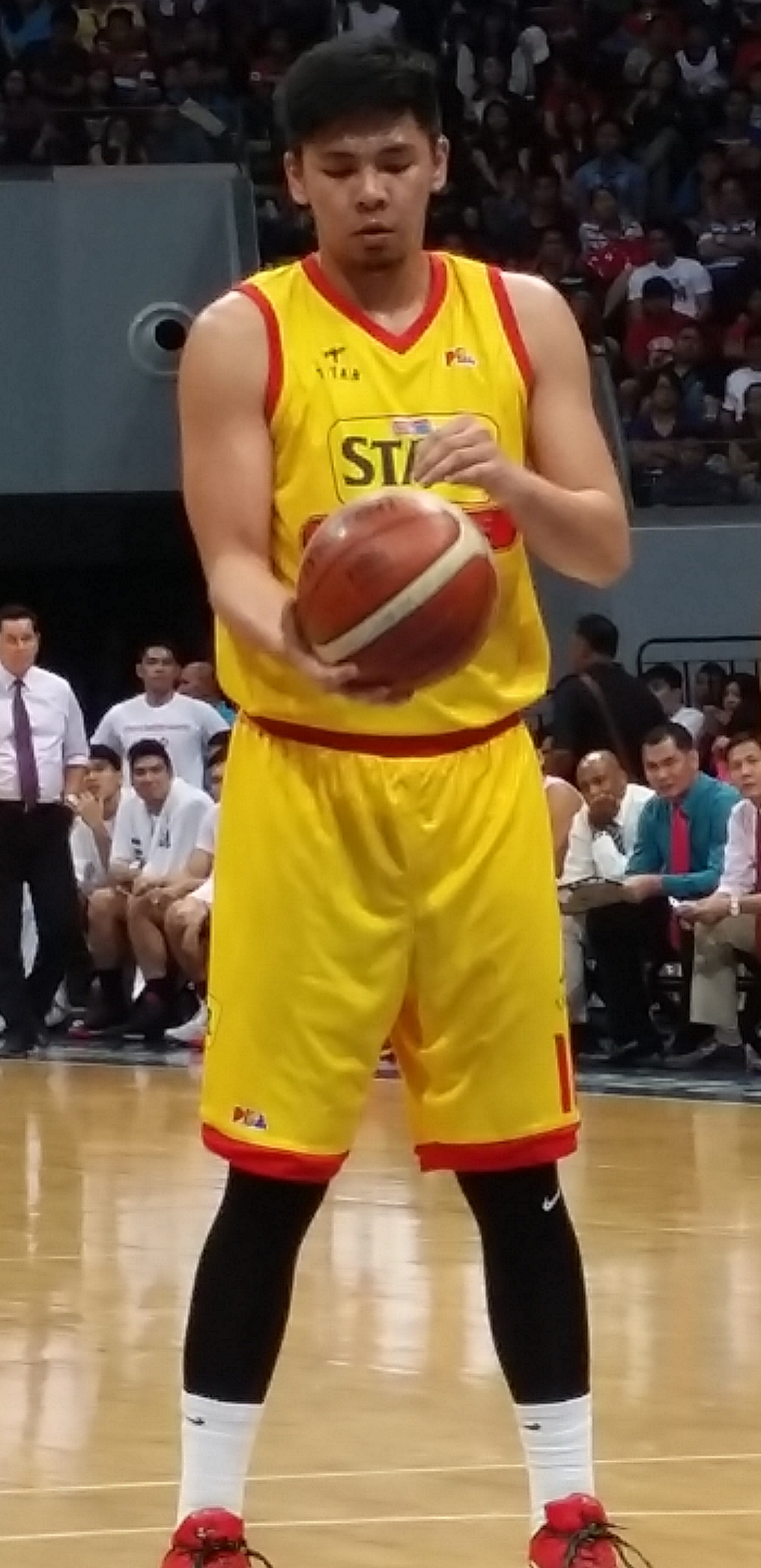
- Sangalang with the Magnolia Hotshots in 2015

No. 10 – Magnolia Chicken Timplados Hotshots
- Position: Center
- League: PBA

Personal information
- Born: December 20, 1991 (age 34) Lubao, Pampanga, Philippines
- Listed height: 6 ft 7 in (2.01 m)
- Listed weight: 212 lb (96 kg)

Career information
- High school: Lubao Institute (Lubao, Pampanga)
- College: San Sebastian
- PBA draft: 2013: 1st round, 2nd overall pick
- Drafted by: San Mig Coffee Mixers
- Playing career: 2013–present

Career history
- 2013–present: Magnolia Chicken Timplados Hotshots

Career highlights
- 4× PBA champion (2013–14 Philippine, 2014 Commissioner's, 2014 Governors', 2018 Governors'); 2× PBA All-Star (2018, 2024); 2× PBA Mythical Second Team (2019, 2021); PBA All-Rookie Team (2014); PBA Comeback Player of the Year (2024); PBA Co-Order of Merit (2021); PBA D-League Best Player of the Conference (2012–13 Aspirant's); PBA D-League champion (2011 Foundation); PCCL Finals MVP (2011); NCAA Philippines champion (2009); NCAA Philippines Most Valuable Player (2012); 2× NCAA Philippines Mythical Five (2011, 2012); NCAA Philippines Defensive Player of the Year (2011); PBL Mythical First Team (2010 PG Flex-Erase Placenta)

Ian Paul Mendoza Sangalang (born December 20, 1991) is a Filipino professional basketball player for the Magnolia Chicken Timplados Hotshots of the Philippine Basketball Association (PBA). He was drafted 2nd overall by the Mixers in the 2013 PBA draft.

== Amateur career ==
=== High school ===
Sangalang came from the Holy Rosary Academy in Lubao, Pampanga but transferred to Lubao Institute (LI). In his fourth year in high school along with fellow PBA player Dexter Maiquez. The LI basketball varsity team won the West Central Zone Championship against Guagua National Colleges (97–45 Final Score) and Provincial Championship for Lubao Institute. LI holds the best record in the basketball tournament Zonal (10–0) Provincial (10–0) . He also won the MVP of the league in the basketball event "In The Zone". Sangalang along with Arwind Santos, Dexter Maiquez and Billy Bansil of Pampanga Dragons are Lubao Institute pride in basketball. Sangalang average 25pts per game 20 rebounds per game.

=== College career ===
He played his college basketball at San Sebastian College - Recoletos de Manila where he teamed up with Calvin Abueva and Ronald Pascual. They were known as the "Pinatubo Trio". They led the Stags to win the NCAA Season 85 men's basketball championship.

He also took his talents in the PBA D-League, suiting up for the NLEX Road Warriors, which featured the same Pinatubo Trio of himself, Abueva and Pascual. Together, they won the 2011 PBA D-League Foundation Cup. He also played for the EA Regen Med Regens in the D-League.

He decided to skip his final year with the Stags in the NCAA. He also cut short his last PBA D-League season after winning the MVP trophy.

== Professional career ==
He signed a two-year, Php 4.5 million rookie contract to play for the Mixers. While playing for San Mig, he provided quality minutes off-the-bench, and was the key contributor in their bid to win the 2013–14 PBA Philippine Cup championship.

After a decent performance during his rookie season and winning the grandslam for San Mig (now re-christened as Purefoods Star) many expected him to play more minutes for his team. However, during their season opening game against Alaska on October 22, 2014, he suffered an ACL tear, his first major injury in his career, after he landed badly while fighting for the rebound. An MRI scan confirmed that he has sustained a partial tear on the anterior cruciate ligament and meniscus on his right knee that sidelined him for up to five to eight months. Despite being sidelined by injury for the entire 2014–15 season, he signed a three-year Php 15 Million new contract with Star during the offseason. He has since returned to action for the Hotshots.

=== Controversies ===
The Philippine Basketball Association Commissioner's office imposed a P20,000 fine on Sangalang for poking Aaron Fuller's left eye causing corneal abrasion in Game 2 of the Governors' Cup quarterfinals. Sangalang however denied Yeng Guiao's accusations as psychological tactics.

== PBA career statistics ==
Legend
GP	Games played	MPG	Minutes per game	FG%	Field-goal percentage
3FG%	3-point field-goal percentage	4P%	4-point field-goal percentage	FT%	Free-throw percentage
RPG	Rebounds per game	APG	Assists per game	SPG	Steals per game
BPG	Blocks per game	PPG	Points per game	127	Career high

As of the end of 2025–26 season

=== Season-by-season averages ===
Year	Team	GP	MPG	FG%	3P%	4P%	FT%	RPG	APG	SPG	BPG	PPG
2013–14	San Mig Super Coffee	71	19.5	.473	.000	—	.558	4.8	.6	.3	.5	7.5
2014–15	Purefoods / Star	1	4.0	.000	—	—	.250	2.0	—	—	—	1.0
2015–16	Star	34	17.1	.494	—	—	.628	3.7	.6	.3	.1	6.0
2016–17	Star	52	20.2	.497	—	—	.702	4.9	.8	.4	.2	9.1
2017–18	Magnolia	52	26.6	.505	.000	—	.637	6.7	1.2	.6	.6	13.4
2019	Magnolia	53	31.0	.462	.500	—	.654	8.5	1.5	.7	1.1	15.1
2020	Magnolia	11	28.5	.469	—	—	.560	8.6	.8	.4	.4	14.7
2021	Magnolia	40	29.3	.451	.000	—	.650	6.9	1.1	.6	.6	13.7
2022–23	Magnolia	36	29.8	.455	.000	—	.652	6.7	1.1	.6	.5	12.9
2023–24	Magnolia	34	25.8	.522	.000	—	.689	5.9	1.3	.4	.4	12.0
2024–25	Magnolia	42	24.2	.539	.500	—	.615	5.2	1.3	.5	.3	11.2
2025–26	Magnolia	39	22.1	.595	.400	—	.655	4.7	1.3	.4	.4	9.9
Career		465	24.4	.491	.316	—	.638	5.9	1.0	.5	.5	11.1

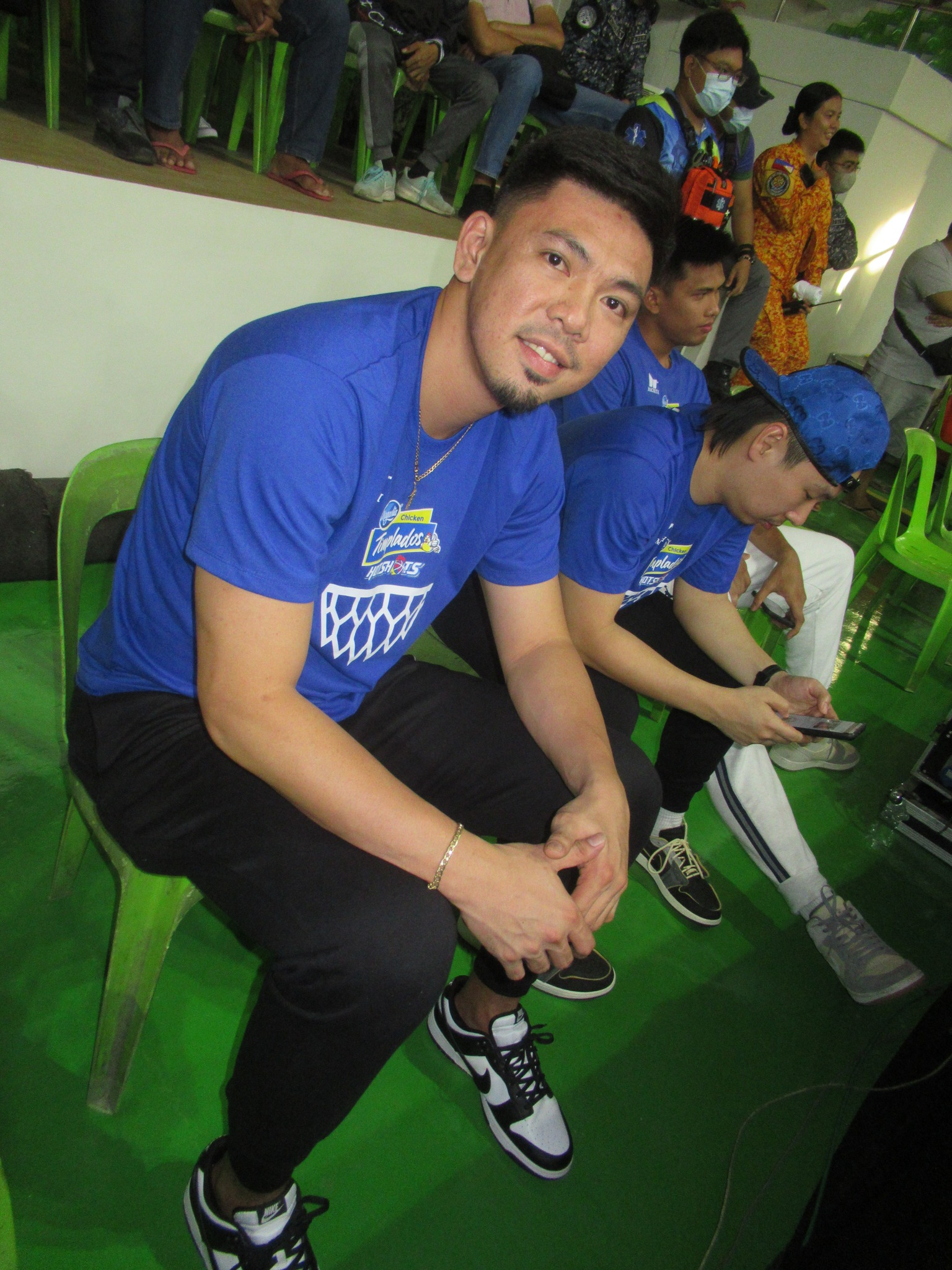
Sangalang in 2023
