= Rodney Brondial =

Filipino basketball player

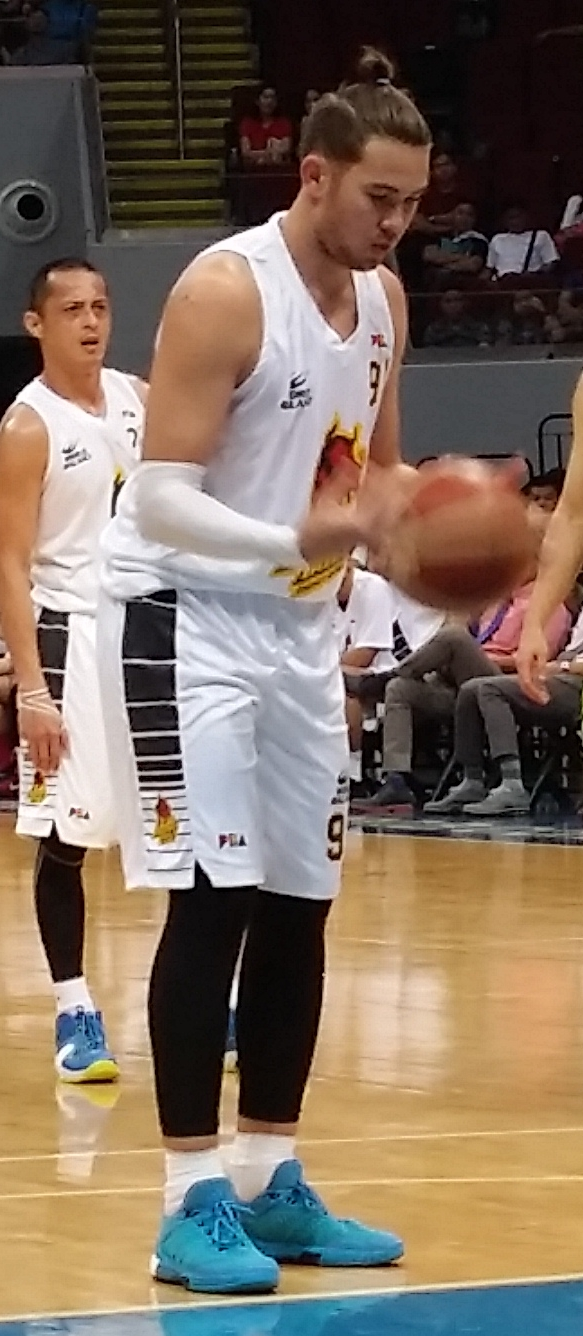
- Brondial with Barako Bull Energy in 2015

No. 91 – San Miguel Beermen
- Position: Power forward
- League: PBA

Personal information
- Born: November 20, 1990 (age 35) Quezon City, Philippines
- Listed height: 6 ft 5 in (1.96 m)
- Listed weight: 210 lb (95 kg)

Career information
- High school: Quezon City Academy (Quezon City)
- College: Adamson
- PBA draft: 2014: 1st round, 6th overall pick
- Drafted by: Barangay Ginebra San Miguel
- Playing career: 2014–present

Career history
- 2014–2015: Barangay Ginebra San Miguel
- 2015–2016: Barako Bull Energy
- 2016: Phoenix Fuel Masters
- 2016–2019: Star/Magnolia Hotshots
- 2019–2021: Alaska Aces
- 2022–present: San Miguel Beermen

Career highlights
- 5× PBA champion (2018 Governors', 2022 Philippine, 2023–24 Commissioner's, 2025 Philippine, 2025–26 Philippine)

John Rodney Sanao Brondial (born November 20, 1990) is a Filipino professional basketball player for the San Miguel Beermen of the Philippine Basketball Association (PBA). He played college basketball for Adamson University in the UAAP. He was drafted 6th overall by Barangay Ginebra in the 2014 PBA draft.

== Amateur career ==
Brondial was discovered by then Adamson coach Leo Austria while playing in an inter-barangay league at Philam Homes in West Avenue, Quezon City where Austria, who happened to be in the neighborhood visiting a relative, spotted him playing in a championship game.

== Professional career ==
After finishing his studies at Adamson, Brondial applied for the 2014 PBA draft. He was picked by Ginebra with their 6th overall pick.

On November 16, 2015, Brondial and a 2018 second-round pick were traded to Barako Bull in exchange for Jervy Cruz.

On May 11, 2016, Brondial was traded to the Magnolia/Star Hotshots along with RR Garcia for two rookies Mark Cruz along with Norbert Torres and veteran guard Jonathan Uyloan. In his second year with the team, Brondial won his first PBA championship against the Alaska Aces in Game 6 of the 2018 Governors' Cup finals series, 4–2.

Brondial was part of the trade that sent Alaska guard Chris Banchero to the Star Hotshots in the latter part of 2019. Brondial was seen as "super reliable" by his new coach, Jeffrey Cariaso, as he flourishes as one of the big men of the Aces, who beat the NorthPorth Batang Pier at the resumption of the "PBA bubble" on November 6, 2020, when he scored 16 points and grabbed 10 rebounds.

On January 6, 2022, Brondial became an unrestricted free agent. He was offered a two-year contract extension but declined. Later that day, he signed a three-year contract with the San Miguel Beermen.

With the PBA Philippine Cup finals series tied at 2-2, Brondial scored 17 points and 15 rebounds in the Beermen's pivotal Game 5 win over the TNT Tropang 5G on January 30, 2026.

== PBA career statistics ==
Legend
GP	Games played	MPG	Minutes per game	FG%	Field-goal percentage
3FG%	3-point field-goal percentage	4P%	4-point field-goal percentage	FT%	Free-throw percentage
RPG	Rebounds per game	APG	Assists per game	SPG	Steals per game
BPG	Blocks per game	PPG	Points per game	127	Career high

As of the end of 2025–26 season

=== Season-by-season averages ===
Year	Team	GP	MPG	FG%	3P%	4P%	FT%	RPG	APG	SPG	BPG	PPG
2014–15	Barangay Ginebra	26	11.4	.509	.000	—	.545	3.5	.4	.2	.2	2.5
2015–16	Barangay Ginebra	29	12.6	.465	.556	—	.536	4.6	.4	.2	.3	3.9
2015–16	Barako Bull	29	12.6	.465	.556	—	.536	4.6	.4	.2	.3	3.9
2015–16	Phoenix	29	12.6	.465	.556	—	.536	4.6	.4	.2	.3	3.9
2015–16	Star	29	12.6	.465	.556	—	.536	4.6	.4	.2	.3	3.9
2016–17	Star	36	8.0	.452	.172	—	.500	2.8	.3	.3	.1	2.5
2017–18	Magnolia	54	8.2	.462	.259	—	.600	2.4	.3	.2	.1	2.4
2019	Magnolia	46	14.5	.421	.180	—	.621	5.2	.5	.2	.2	4.8
2019	Alaska	46	14.5	.421	.180	—	.621	5.2	.5	.2	.2	4.8
2020	Alaska	12	19.9	.604	.538	—	.647	6.0	.7	.3	.6	6.8
2021	Alaska	23	17.5	.467	.333	—	.632	5.6	1.0	.4	.6	5.2
2021	San Miguel	23	17.5	.467	.333	—	.632	5.6	1.0	.4	.6	5.2
2022–23	San Miguel	53	14.2	.565	.200	—	.560	4.5	.7	.2	.2	4.0
2023–24	San Miguel	37	12.4	.612	.333	—	.300	3.8	.9	.2	.2	3.6
2024–25	San Miguel	45	16.1	.539	.500	.000	.600	5.5	.9	.4	.2	3.4
2025–26	San Miguel	50	18.0	.635	.231	—	.613	6.1	.9	.6	.4	5.0
Career		411	13.5	.519	.268	.000	.569	4.4	.6	.3	.2	3.8
