= Chito Victolero =

Filipino basketball player and coach (born 1975)

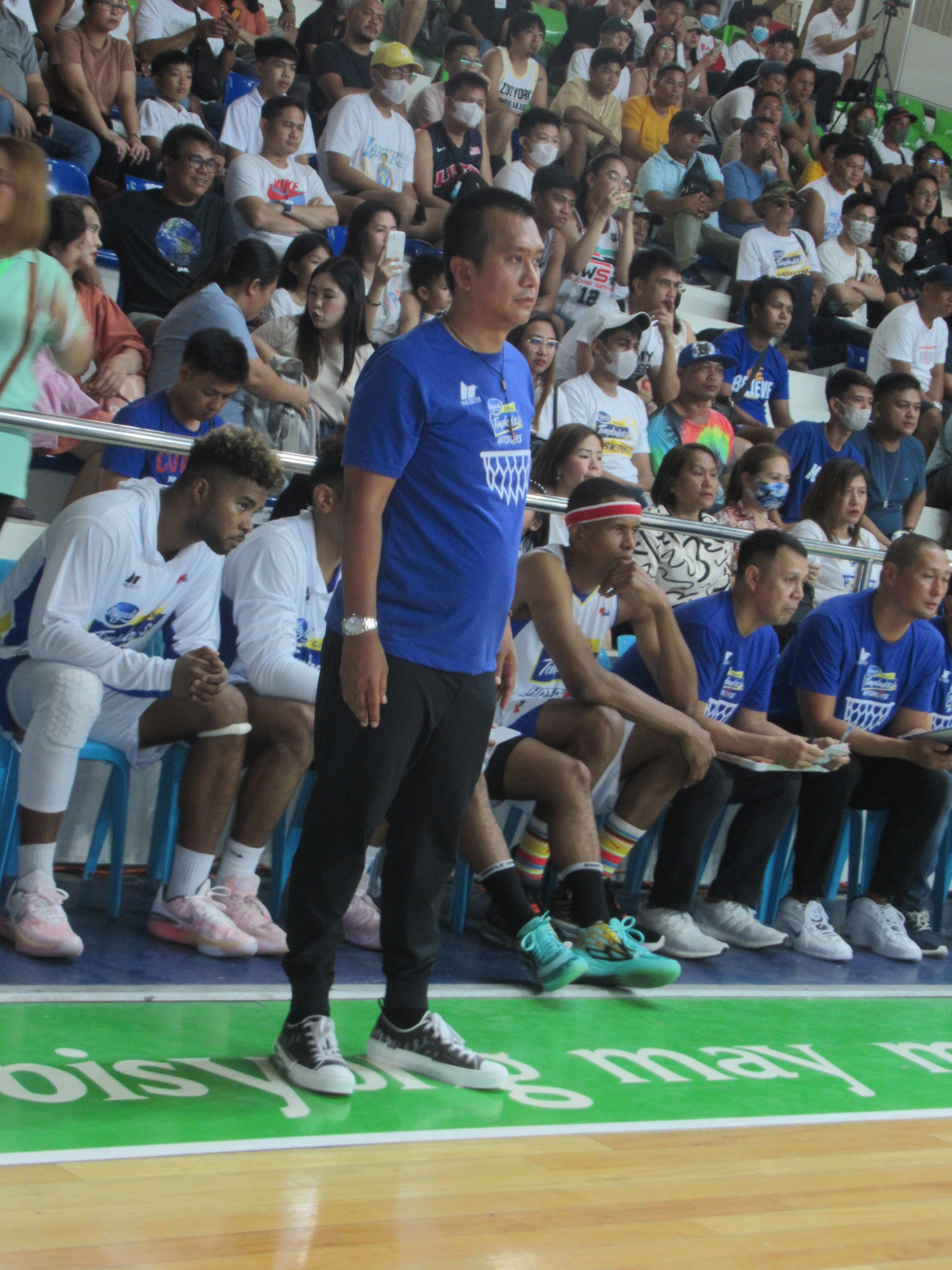
- Victolero with the Magnolia Chicken Timplados Hotshots in 2023

Mapúa Cardinals
- Title: Head coach
- League: NCAA Philippines

Personal information
- Born: November 29, 1975 (age 50) Santa Maria, Bulacan, Philippines
- Listed height: 5 ft 10 in (1.78 m)
- Listed weight: 153 lb (69 kg)

Career information
- College: Mapúa
- PBA draft: 2002: 2nd round, 13th overall pick
- Drafted by: Sta. Lucia Realtors
- Playing career: 1998–2005
- Position: Point guard
- Coaching career: 2009–present

Career history

Playing
- 1995–1996: Stag Pale Pilseners
- 1998: Manila Metrostars
- 1999–2001: San Juan Knights
- 2002–2005: Sta. Lucia Realtors
- 2005: FedEx Express

Coaching
- 2009–2012: Mapúa
- 2014–2016: Kia Carnival / Kia Sorento / Mahindra Enforcer (assistant)
- 2016–2025: Magnolia Chicken Timplados Hotshots
- 2026–present: Mapúa

Career highlights
- As player: SEABA & South East Asian Games Goldmedalist (2001); 3x Metropolitan Basketball Association Champion, (Crossover Cup 2000, Intracon Challenge 2000, MBA National Champions 2000); 4× PBL champion (1995–96 Reinforced, 1995–96 All-Filipino, 1995–96 Danny Floro, 1996 Danny Floro); As head coach: PBA champion (2018 Governors'); PBA Baby Dalupan Coach of the Year (2018)

Ercito "Chito" Victolero (born November 29, 1975) is a Filipino professional basketball coach and former player who serves as the head coach for the Mapúa Cardinals of NCAA Philippines.

His playing career began in 1995 with the Stag Pale Pilseners of the Philippine Basketball League (PBL). In 1998, he turned pro upon joining the Manila Metrostars of the Metropolitan Basketball Association before moving to the first incarnation of the San Juan Knights in 1999. He played in the PBA for the Sta. Lucia Realtors where he was drafted by the Realtors in the second round of the 2002 PBA draft as the 13th overall pick and played there until 2005 when he had a short stint with the FedEx Express.

In 2009, Victolero began his coaching career with the Mapúa Cardinals where he coached the team until 2012. In 2014, he returned to the PBA where he coached the Kia / Mahindra franchise before a move to the Magnolia Hotshots in 2016, leading the team to a PBA title in the 2018 PBA Governors' Cup. He would go on to run the playbook for the Hotshots until his replacement in 2025. In 2026, he returned to Mapúa.

== Early years ==
Victolero first played high school ball for the Sacred Heart Academy in Bulacan and later became a member of the Region III squad in the PRISAA. From there, he made it to the varsity squad and joined the Mapua Cardinals under coach Joel Banal in 1992, a year after MIT had completed back-to-back title conquests in the senior division of the NCAA.

He played in his first commercial ballclub in 1995 with the Stag Pale Pilsen in the Philippine Basketball League under coach Alfrancis Chua and was a member of the Pilseners that won the historic grandslam in the PBL.

== Professional career ==
After playing college basketball for Mapúa, by 1998 he played for MBA Manila Metrostars, and in 1999 he is transfer in the expansion team San Juan Knights until 2001. Victorelo applied for the 2002 PBA draft where he was drafted thirteenth overall by the Sta. Lucia Realtors.

Before the 2005 Fiesta Conference, Victolero was signed by the FedEx Express where he played for one conference.

== Coaching career ==
In April 2009, Victolero was hired by his alma mater, Mapúa, to be the head coach of the university's team, the Mapúa Cardinals. However, Victorelo resigned from his post as head coach. According to a source, the Mapúa school administration was on the verge of firing Victolero because of the team's poor performances in the NCAA. The school administration also elected not to renew Victorelo's expiring contract, but Victolero left his post before the school administration could inform him in a scheduled meeting.

Before the 2014–15 PBA season, Victolero was hired by the Kia Sorento to be one of the team's assistant coaches. Kia Head coach Manny Pacquiao credited Victolero as one of the reasons for Kia's inspiring run for the franchise's first season.

Before the 2016–17 PBA season, Victolero was hired by Star Hotshots to be their head coach. In 2025, Victolero was replaced by retiring player LA Tenorio.

On February 25, 2026, Victolero was named head coach of the Mapúa Cardinals, returning to his coaching roots since his initial departure in 2012.

== Coaching record ==
=== Collegiate record ===
Season	Team	Elimination round					Playoffs				
Season	Team	GP	W	L	PCT	Finish	GP	W	L	PCT	Results
2009	MIT	18	6	12	.333	6th	–	–	–	–	Eliminated
2010	MIT	16	9	7	.562	4th	1	0	1	.000	Stepladder round 1
2011	MIT	18	7	11	.389	5th	–	–	–	–	Eliminated
2012	MIT	18	8	10	.444	6th	–	–	–	–	Eliminated
Totals		70	30	40	.428		1	0	1	.000	0 championships

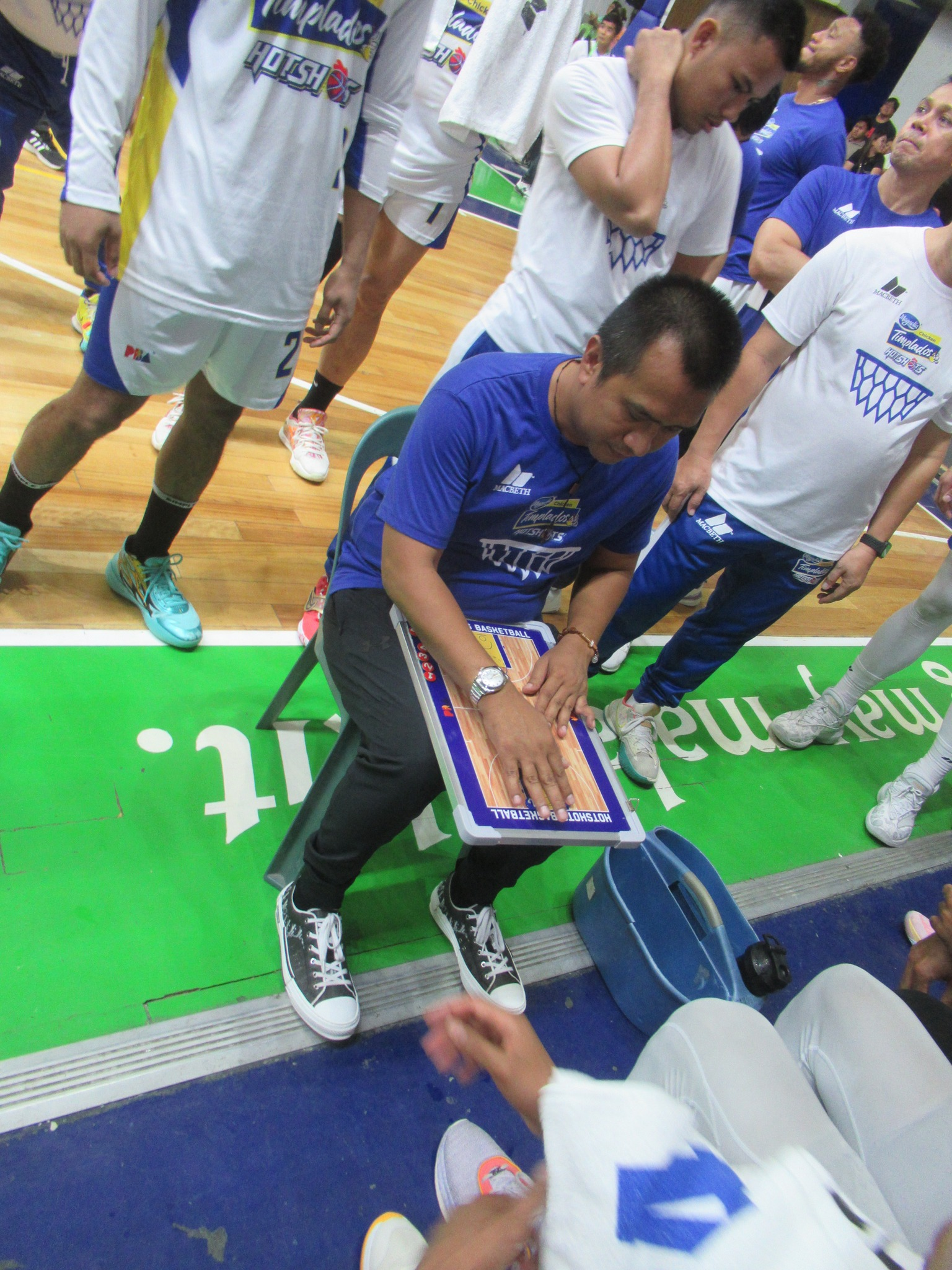
Victolero coaching Magnolia Hotshots

=== Professional record ===
Season	Team	Eliminations				Playoffs				
Season	Team	W	L	PCT	Finish	PG	W	L	PCT	Results
2016–17	Star	23	10	.697	3rd	19	9	10	.474	Semifinals
2017–18	Magnolia	22	11	.667	2nd	24	14	10	.583	Champions
2019	Magnolia	17	16	.515	6th	20	9	11	.450	Finals
2020	Magnolia	7	4	.636	7th	1	0	1	.000	Quarterfinals
2021	Magnolia	17	5	.773	2nd	19	10	9	.526	Finals
2022–23	Magnolia	25	9	.735	2nd	15	6	9	.400	Semifinals
Totals		111	55	.668		98	48	50	.489	1 championship
