= 2021 Blackwater Bossing season =

- Head coach: Ariel Vanguardia (interim)
- Owner(s): Ever Bilena Cosmetics, Inc.

Philippine Cup results
- Record: 0–11 (0%)
- Place: 12th
- Playoff finish: Did not qualify

Governors' Cup results
- Record: 1–10 (9.1%)
- Place: 12th
- Playoff finish: Did not qualify

Blackwater Bossing seasons

The 2021 Blackwater Bossing season was the 7th season of the franchise in the Philippine Basketball Association (PBA).

== Key dates ==
- March 14: The PBA season 46 draft was held at the TV5 Media Center in Mandaluyong.

== Draft picks ==
| Round | Pick | Player | Position | Place of birth | College |
|---|---|---|---|---|---|
| 2 | 14 | Rey Mark Acuno | C | Philippines | UE |
| 2 | 15 | Joshua Torralba | G/F | USA | La Salle |
| 3 | 27 | Andre Paras | C/F | USA | UP |
| 4 | 38 | Jun Manzo | G | Philippines | UP |
| 5 | 48 | Kim Bayquin | G | Philippines | FEU |
| 6 | 56 | Jeson Delfinado | G | Philippines | FEU |

== Roster ==
2021 Blackwater Bossing roster
Players
Coaches

| Pos. | # | POB | Name | Height | Weight | DOB (YYYY–MM–DD) | From |
|---|---|---|---|---|---|---|---|
| F | 00 | (Philippines) | Jay Washington | 6 ft 7 in (2.01 m) | 210 lb (95 kg) | 1981–10–10 | Eckerd |
| G | 1 | (Philippines) | Baser Amer | 6 ft 0 in (1.83 m) | 170 lb (77 kg) | 1992–09–29 | San Beda |
| G | 2 | (United States) | Rashawn McCarthy | 6 ft 0 in (1.83 m) | 175 lb (79 kg) | 1989–09–10 | SUNY–Old Westbury |
| G/F | 4 | (Philippines) | Rey Suerte (R) | 6 ft 3 in (1.91 m) | 175 lb (79 kg) | 1994–10–04 | UE |
| G | 5 | (Peru) | Val Chauca | 5 ft 10 in (1.78 m) | | 1994–10–11 | Adamson |
| F/C | 6 | (Philippines) | Jonjon Gabriel | 6 ft 6 in (1.98 m) | | 1993–01–06 | San Lorenzo |
| F | 14 | (United States) | Andre Paras (R) | 6 ft 4 in (1.93 m) | 217 lb (98 kg) | 1995–11–01 | UP Diliman |
| G/F | 15 | (United States) | Joshua Torralba (injured) (R) | 6 ft 2 in (1.88 m) | 204 lb (93 kg) | 1993–09–09 | De La Salle |
| F/C | 16 | (Philippines) | Barkley Eboña | 6 ft 6 in (1.98 m) | 194 lb (88 kg) | 1996–11–29 | Far Eastern |
| G | 18 | (Philippines) | Paul Desiderio | 5 ft 10 in (1.78 m) | 150 lb (68 kg) | 1997–02–02 | UP Diliman |
| C | 20 | (Philippines) | John Ambulodto (R) | 6 ft 5 in (1.96 m) | 195 lb (88 kg) | 1990–09–25 | St. Clare |
| G | 21 | (Philippines) | Justin Melton | 5 ft 9 in (1.75 m) | 163 lb (74 kg) | 1987–04–07 | Mount Olive |
| F | 23 | (Philippines) | Richard Escoto | 6 ft 3 in (1.91 m) | 204 lb (93 kg) | 1997–03–21 | Far Eastern |
| G | 28 | (Philippines) | Mike Ayonayon | 6 ft 0 in (1.83 m) | | 1992–12–08 | Philippine Christian |
| F/C | 33 | (United States) | Kelly Nabong | 6 ft 6 in (1.98 m) | 227 lb (103 kg) | 1988–11–17 | SRJC |
| G | 42 | (Philippines) | JVee Casio | 5 ft 10 in (1.78 m) | 175 lb (79 kg) | 1986–09–01 | De La Salle |
| G | 45 | (Philippines) | Juneric Baloria | 5 ft 11 in (1.80 m) | 180 lb (82 kg) | 1990–06–03 | UPHSD |

Head coach

- (Philippines) Ariel Vanguardia (interim)

Assistant coach(es)

- (Philippines) Justino Pinat (1st assistant)
- (Philippines) Patrick Aquino
- (Philippines) Junjie Ablan
- (Philippines) Aries Dimaunahan
- (Philippines) Da Olan

Team manager

- (Philippines) Johnson Martinez
- (Philippines) Jacob Nunez (assistant)

Legend

- (C) Team captain
- (CI) Commissioner's Cup Import
- (GI) Governors' Cup Import
- (EI) EASL Import
- (DP) Unsigned draft pick
- (FA) Free agent
- (IN) Inactive
- (S) Suspended
- (R) Rookie
- Injured

Roster

== Philippine Cup ==
=== Eliminations ===
==== Standings ====
| Pos | Team | W | L | PCT | GB | Qualification |
|---|---|---|---|---|---|---|
| 1 | TNT Tropang Giga | 10 | 1 | .909 | — | Twice-to-beat in the quarterfinals |
| 2 | Meralco Bolts | 9 | 2 | .818 | 1 | Twice-to-beat in the quarterfinals |
| 3 | Magnolia Pambansang Manok Hotshots | 8 | 3 | .727 | 2 | Best-of-three quarterfinals |
| 4 | San Miguel Beermen | 7 | 4 | .636 | 3 | Best-of-three quarterfinals |
| 5 | NorthPort Batang Pier | 6 | 5 | .545 (Note: Head-to-head record: NorthPort 1–0 Rain or Shine) | 4 | Best-of-three quarterfinals |
| 6 | Rain or Shine Elasto Painters | 6 | 5 | .545 | 4 | Best-of-three quarterfinals |
| 7 | NLEX Road Warriors | 5 | 6 | .455 | 5 | Twice-to-win in the quarterfinals |
| 8 | Barangay Ginebra San Miguel | 4 | 7 | .364 (Note: Head-to-head quotient: Phoenix 1.03, Barangay Ginebra 1.01, Terrafirma 0.96; eighth seed playoff: Barangay Ginebra 95–85 Phoenix) | 6 | Twice-to-win in the quarterfinals |
| 9 | Phoenix Super LPG Fuel Masters | 4 | 7 | .364 | 6 | |
| 10 | Terrafirma Dyip | 4 | 7 | .364 | 6 | |
| 11 | Alaska Aces | 3 | 8 | .273 | 7 | |
| 12 | Blackwater Bossing | 0 | 11 | .000 | 10 | |

Source: PBA.ph
Rules for classification: 1) winning percentage; 2) if two teams are tied, head-to-head record; if three or more teams are tied, head-to-head goal average (quotient), if tied for 8th, one-game playoff; 3) overall quotient 4) coin toss

==== Game log ====
2021 PBA Philippine Cup game log
Total: 0–11
July: 0–4

| Game | Date | Opponent | Score | High points | High rebounds | High assists | Location Attendance | Record |
|---|---|---|---|---|---|---|---|---|
| 1 | July 16 | Alaska | L 77–103 | Simon Enciso (23) | Kelly Nabong (9) | Amer, Enciso, Magat (3) | Ynares Sports Arena | 0–1 |
| 2 | July 18 | Rain or Shine | L 62–71 | Kelly Nabong (18) | Marion Magat (10) | Simon Enciso (3) | Ynares Sports Arena | 0–2 |
| 3 | July 23 | Barangay Ginebra | L 81–96 | Mike Tolomia (22) | Kelly Nabong (7) | Simon Enciso (5) | Ynares Sports Arena | 0–3 |
| 4 | July 28 | San Miguel | L 80–99 | Simon Enciso (25) | David Semerad (8) | Mike Tolomia (6) | Ynares Sports Arena | 0–4 |

September : 0–7

| Game | Date | Opponent | Score | High points | High rebounds | High assists | Location Attendance | Record |
|---|---|---|---|---|---|---|---|---|
| 5 | September 1 | TNT | L 76–96 | Simon Enciso (14) | Kelly Nabong (12) | Mike Tolomia (6) | DHVSU Gym | 0–5 |
| 6 | September 3 | Magnolia | L 78–94 | Kelly Nabong (19) | Kelly Nabong (14) | Simon Enciso (5) | DHVSU Gym | 0–6 |
| 7 | September 5 | Terrafirma | L 84–96 | Mike Tolomia (14) | Kelly Nabong (8) | Mike Tolomia (5) | DHVSU Gym | 0–7 |
| 8 | September 9 | NorthPort | L 73–98 | Frank Golla (14) | Frank Golla (7) | Simon Enciso (7) | DHVSU Gym | 0–8 |
| 9 | September 11 | Phoenix Super LPG | L 92–114 | Mike Tolomia (23) | Ed Daquioag (7) | Ed Daquioag (5) | DHVSU Gym | 0–9 |
| 10 | September 16 | NLEX | L 73–90 | Simon Enciso (17) | Marion Magat (7) | Simon Enciso (7) | DHVSU Gym | 0–10 |
| 11 | September 18 | Meralco | L 97–104 | Canaleta, Escoto, Tolomia (15) | Mike Tolomia (8) | Enciso, Tolomia (4) | DHVSU Gym | 0–11 |

== Governors' Cup ==
=== Eliminations ===
==== Standings ====
| Pos | Team | W | L | PCT | GB | Qualification |
|---|---|---|---|---|---|---|
| 1 | Magnolia Pambansang Manok Hotshots | 9 | 2 | .818 | — | Twice-to-beat in quarterfinals |
| 2 | NLEX Road Warriors | 8 | 3 | .727 | 1 | Twice-to-beat in quarterfinals |
| 3 | TNT Tropang Giga | 7 | 4 | .636 (Note: Head-to-head quotient: TNT 1.07, Meralco 0.99, San Miguel 0.95) | 2 | Twice-to-beat in quarterfinals |
| 4 | Meralco Bolts | 7 | 4 | .636 | 2 | Twice-to-beat in quarterfinals |
| 5 | San Miguel Beermen | 7 | 4 | .636 | 2 | Twice-to-win in quarterfinals |
| 6 | Barangay Ginebra San Miguel | 6 | 5 | .545 (Note: Head-to-head record: Barangay Ginebra 1–0 Alaska) | 3 | Twice-to-win in quarterfinals |
| 7 | Alaska Aces | 6 | 5 | .545 | 3 | Twice-to-win in quarterfinals |
| 8 | Phoenix Super LPG Fuel Masters | 5 | 6 | .455 (Note: Eighth seed playoff: Phoenix 101–98 NorthPort) | 4 | Twice-to-win in quarterfinals |
| 9 | NorthPort Batang Pier | 5 | 6 | .455 | 4 | |
| 10 | Rain or Shine Elasto Painters | 3 | 8 | .273 | 6 | |
| 11 | Terrafirma Dyip | 2 | 9 | .182 | 7 | |
| 12 | Blackwater Bossing | 1 | 10 | .091 | 8 | |

Source: PBA.ph
Rules for classification: 1) winning percentage; 2) if two teams are tied, head-to-head record; if three or more teams are tied, head-to-head goal average (quotient), if tied for 8th, one-game playoff; 3) overall quotient 4) coin toss

==== Game log ====
2021 PBA Governors' Cup game log
Total: 1–10
December: 0–5

| Game | Date | Opponent | Score | High points | High rebounds | High assists | Location Attendance | Record |
|---|---|---|---|---|---|---|---|---|
| 1 | December 9 | Rain or Shine | L 79–92 | Rashawn McCarthy (15) | Bond, Eboña (11) | Baser Amer (7) | Ynares Sports Arena | 0–1 |
| 2 | December 11 | Phoenix Super LPG | L 99–110 | Jaylen Bond (18) | Jaylen Bond (15) | Rashawn McCarthy (7) | Ynares Sports Arena | 0–2 |
| 3 | December 16 | Meralco | L 77–98 | Rashawn McCarthy (19) | Jaylen Bond (15) | Rashawn McCarthy (3) | Smart Araneta Coliseum | 0–3 |
| 4 | December 18 | San Miguel | L 88–107 | Paul Desiderio (16) | Jaylen Bond (17) | Ed Daquioag (6) | Smart Araneta Coliseum | 0–4 |
| 5 | December 22 | Alaska | L 75–98 | Rashawn McCarthy (16) | Richard Escoto (7) | Baser Amer (6) | Smart Araneta Coliseum | 0–5 |

February : 0–3

| Game | Date | Opponent | Score | High points | High rebounds | High assists | Location Attendance | Record |
|---|---|---|---|---|---|---|---|---|
| 6 | February 12, 2022 | Terrafirma | L 103–109 | Shawn Glover (35) | Shawn Glover (17) | JVee Casio (5) | Smart Araneta Coliseum | 0–6 |
| 7 | February 18, 2022 | NLEX | L 97–117 | Shawn Glover (39) | Shawn Glover (15) | Ayonayon, Casio (5) | Smart Araneta Coliseum | 0–7 |
| 8 | February 25, 2022 | Barangay Ginebra | L 100–109 | Shawn Glover (29) | Shawn Glover (6) | JVee Casio (6) | Ynares Center | 0–8 |

March : 1–2

| Game | Date | Opponent | Score | High points | High rebounds | High assists | Location Attendance | Record |
|---|---|---|---|---|---|---|---|---|
| 9 | March 2, 2022 | NorthPort | L 103–116 | Shawn Glover (47) | Shawn Glover (12) | JVee Casio (8) | Smart Araneta Coliseum | 0–9 |
| 10 | March 4, 2022 | TNT | L 93–106 | Shawn Glover (26) | Shawn Glover (15) | Shawn Glover (9) | Smart Araneta Coliseum | 0–10 |
| 11 | March 9, 2022 | Magnolia | W 101–100 | Shawn Glover (33) | Shawn Glover (9) | Shawn Glover (7) | Smart Araneta Coliseum | 1–10 |

== Transactions ==
=== Free agency ===
==== Signings ====
| Player | Date signed | Contract amount | Contract length | Former team |
|---|---|---|---|---|
| Kelly Nabong | March 25, 2021 | Not disclosed | Six months | NorthPort Batang Pier |
| Val Chauca | September 30, 2021 | Not disclosed | Not disclosed | N/A |
| Juneric Baloria | October 15, 2021 | Not disclosed | One-conference | Basilan Peace Riders (Pilipinas VisMin Super Cup) |
| John Ambulodto | December 30, 2021 | Not disclosed | Not disclosed | Manila Stars (MPBL) |

=== Trades ===
==== Pre-season ====
February
| February 4, 2021 | To Blackwater Baser Amer; Bryan Faundo | To Meralco Mac Belo |
March
| March 11, 2021 | To Blackwater 2020 NLEX first-round pick (No. 4) | To NLEX Maurice Shaw; Roi Sumang; Don Trollano; 2022 Blackwater second-round pick |
| March 11, 2021 | To Blackwater Simon Enciso; David Semerad; 2023 TNT first-round pick 2024 TNT second-round pick | To TNT 2020 NLEX first-round pick (No. 4) |

==== Philippine Cup ====
September
| September 28, 2021 | To Blackwater Rashawn McCarthy | To Terrafirma Simon Enciso |
October
| October 12, 2021 | To Blackwater JVee Casio; Barkley Eboña | To Alaska Mike Tolomia; 2022 Blackwater second-round pick |

==== Mid-season ====
November
| November 16, 2021 | To Blackwater Mike Ayonayon; Will McAloney | To NLEX Marion Magat; 2023 Blackwater second-round pick |
December
| December 3, 2021 | To Blackwater Jay Washington; 2022 NorthPort second-round pick 2025 TNT second-round pick | To TNT Carl Bryan Cruz |

==== Governors' Cup ====
December
| December 24, 2021 | To Blackwater Justin Melton | To Terrafirma Ed Daquioag |

=== Recruited imports ===
| Tournament | Name | Debuted | Last game | Record |
|---|---|---|---|---|
| Governors' Cup | Jaylen Bond | December 9, 2021 (vs. Rain or Shine) | December 22, 2021 (vs. Alaska) | 0–5 |
| Governors' Cup | Shawn Glover | February 12, 2022 (vs. Terrafirma) | March 9, 2022 (vs. Magnolia) | 1–5 |
