= 2021 PBA Philippine Cup =

First conference of the 2021 PBA season

- Duration: July 16 – August 3, 2021 (before suspension); September 1 – October 29, 2021 (resumption)
- TV partner(s): Local: One Sports; TV5; PBA Rush (HD); International: AksyonTV International

Finals
- Champions: TNT Tropang Giga
- Runners-up: Magnolia Pambansang Manok Hotshots

Awards
- Best Player: Calvin Abueva (Magnolia Pambansang Manok Hotshots)
- Finals MVP: Mikey Williams (TNT Tropang Giga)

PBA Philippine Cup chronology
- < 2020 2022 >

PBA conference chronology
- < 2020 Philippine 2021 Governors' >

The 2021 Philippine Cup, also known as the 2021 Honda PBA Philippine Cup for sponsorship reasons, was the first conference of the 2021 PBA season of the Philippine Basketball Association (PBA). The 43rd PBA Philippine Cup started on July 16, 2021, and ended on October 29, 2021. The tournament did not allow teams to hire foreign players or imports.

On August 3, the league announced that it will be suspending their games beginning August 4 after the government declared that Metro Manila will be under Enhanced Community Quarantine from August 6 to 20. The league have appealed to the Inter-Agency Task Force for the Management of Emerging Infectious Diseases (IATF-EID) if they can continue their tournament in Batangas, which is under a more relaxed quarantine restrictions.

On August 31, the tournament resumed and the games were played Don Honorio Ventura State University Gymnasium in Bacolor, Pampanga.

== Format ==
The following format will be observed for the duration of the conference:

- Single-round robin eliminations; 11 games per team; Teams are then seeded by basis on win–loss records.
- Top eight teams will advance to the quarterfinals. In case of tie, playoff games will be held only for the #8 seed.
- Quarterfinals:
  - QF1: #1 vs #8 (#1 twice-to-beat)
  - QF2: #2 vs #7 (#2 twice-to-beat)
  - QF3: #3 vs #6 (best-of-3 series)
  - QF4: #4 vs #5 (best-of-3 series)
- Semifinals (best-of-7 series):
  - SF1: QF1 Winner vs. QF4 Winner
  - SF2: QF2 Winner vs. QF3 Winner
- Finals (best-of-7 series)
  - F1: SF1 Winner vs SF2 Winner

== Elimination round ==
=== Team standings ===
Pos	Team	W	L	PCT	GB	Qualification
1	TNT Tropang Giga	10	1	.909	—	Twice-to-beat in the quarterfinals
2	Meralco Bolts	9	2	.818	1	Twice-to-beat in the quarterfinals
3	Magnolia Pambansang Manok Hotshots	8	3	.727	2	Best-of-three quarterfinals
4	San Miguel Beermen	7	4	.636	3	Best-of-three quarterfinals
5	NorthPort Batang Pier	6	5	.545 (Note: Head-to-head record: NorthPort 1–0 Rain or Shine)	4	Best-of-three quarterfinals
6	Rain or Shine Elasto Painters	6	5	.545	4	Best-of-three quarterfinals
7	NLEX Road Warriors	5	6	.455	5	Twice-to-win in the quarterfinals
8	Barangay Ginebra San Miguel	4	7	.364 (Note: Head-to-head quotient: Phoenix 1.03, Barangay Ginebra 1.01, Terrafirma 0.96; eighth seed playoff: Barangay Ginebra 95–85 Phoenix)	6	Twice-to-win in the quarterfinals
9	Phoenix Super LPG Fuel Masters	4	7	.364	6	
10	Terrafirma Dyip	4	7	.364	6	
11	Alaska Aces	3	8	.273	7	
12	Blackwater Bossing	0	11	.000	10	

Source: PBA.ph
Rules for classification: 1) winning percentage; 2) if two teams are tied, head-to-head record; if three or more teams are tied, head-to-head goal average (quotient), if tied for 8th, one-game playoff; 3) overall quotient 4) coin toss

=== Schedule ===
Team ╲ Game	1	2	3	4	5	6	7	8	9	10	11
Alaska Aces	BWB	MAG	PHX	ROS	MER	NLEX	BGSM	TNT	TER	SMB	NP
Barangay Ginebra San Miguel	NLEX	BWB	MAG	NP	TER	ROS	SMB	TNT	PHX	ALA	MER
Blackwater Bossing	ALA	ROS	BGSM	SMB	TNT	MAG	TER	NP	PHX	NLEX	MER
Magnolia Pambansang Manok Hotshots	PHX	ALA	BGSM	TER	MER	BWB	TNT	NLEX	ROS	NP	SMB
Meralco Bolts	NP	SMB	ROS	PHX	ALA	MAG	TNT	TER	BWB	NLEX	BGSM
NLEX Road Warriors	ROS	BGSM	SMB	TER	ALA	PHX	MAG	TNT	NP	BWB	MER
NorthPort Batang Pier	MER	PHX	SMB	BGSM	BWB	TER	NLEX	TNT	MAG	ROS	ALA
Phoenix Super LPG Fuel Masters	MAG	NP	ALA	MER	TNT	ROS	NLEX	TER	BWB	BGSM	SMB
Rain or Shine Elasto Painters	NLEX	BWB	MER	ALA	TNT	TER	PHX	BGSM	MAG	SMB	NP
San Miguel Beermen	MER	NLEX	NP	BWB	TER	TNT	BGSM	ROS	PHX	MAG	ALA
Terrafirma Dyip	TNT	NLEX	MAG	ROS	SMB	BGSM	BWB	PHX	NP	MER	ALA
TNT Tropang Giga	TER	ROS	PHX	BWB	MER	MAG	SMB	NLEX	BGSM	NP	ALA

Source: PBA.ph
= Win; = OT win; = Loss; = OT loss

=== Results ===
Teams	ALA	BGSM	BWB	MAG	MER	NLEX	NP	PHX	ROS	SMB	TER	TNT
Alaska Aces	—	89–75	103–77	82–84	80–89	74–84	94–122	93–101	74–48	100–101	89–105	85–103
Barangay Ginebra San Miguel		—	96–81	79–89	66–79	75–94	87–85	94–87	83–77	102–111	90–95	67–88
Blackwater Bossing			—	78–94	97–104	73–90	73–98	92–114	62–71	80–99	84–96	76–96
Magnolia Pambansang Manok Hotshots				—	94–95	112–105**	90–89	80–73	72–75	100–90	105–83	76–83
Meralco Bolts					—	104–101	85–63	91–80	72–85	93–87	95–83	76–91
NLEX Road Warriors						—	94–96	94–76	82–83	93–110	108–94	85–100
NorthPort Batang Pier							—	115–79	91–88*	86–88	104–84	92–102
Phoenix Super LPG Fuel Masters								—	78–77	80–110	96–84	80–84
Rain or Shine Elasto Painters									—	95–93	83–77	69–79
San Miguel Beermen										—	104–110*	83–67
Terrafirma Dyip											—	79–86
TNT Tropang Giga												—

Source: PBA.ph results, PBA.ph schedule
Legend: Blue = left column team win; Red = top row team win.
Matches with lighter background shading were decided after overtime.

=== Postponed games due to COVID-19 ===
- July 21: Terrafirma vs. Alaska and TNT vs. Magnolia
- July 23: Rain or Shine vs. Terrafirma
- July 24: Meralco vs. TNT
- July 31: Blackwater vs. Phoenix
- August 1: San Miguel vs. Barangay Ginebra
- September 4: Alaska vs. San Miguel
- September 5: Meralco vs. Barangay Ginebra

== Eighth seed playoff ==
One Sports

September 25
4:35 pm

Box score

Barangay Ginebra San Miguel 95, Phoenix Super LPG Fuel Masters 85
Scoring by quarter: 22–20, 27–18, 30–28, 16–19
Pts: Caperal 19; Rebs: Standhardinger 12; Asts: Pringle, Tenorio 4	Pts: Perkins 15; Rebs: Pascual 11; Asts: Wright 8

DHSVU Gym, Bacolor, Pampanga
Referees: Jimmy Mariano, Albert Nubla, Jeffrey Tantay, Bryan Peclaro

== Bracket ==
Quarterfinals
(#1 twice-to-beat)
1	TNT	84
8	Barangay Ginebra	71
(best-of-3)
4	San Miguel	2
5	NorthPort	0
(#2 twice-to-beat)
2	Meralco	80	97
7	NLEX	81	86
(best-of-3)
3	Magnolia	2
6	Rain or Shine	0

Semifinals (best-of-7)
1	TNT	4
4	San Miguel	3
2	Meralco	2
3	Magnolia	4

Finals (best-of-7)
1	TNT	4
3	Magnolia	1

== Quarterfinals ==
=== (1) TNT vs. (8) Barangay Ginebra ===
TNT has the twice-to-beat advantage; they have to be beaten twice, while their opponents just once, to advance.

One Sports

September 29
6:00 pm

Box score

TNT Tropang Giga 84, Barangay Ginebra San Miguel 71
Scoring by quarter: 17–21, 22–12, 27–16, 18–22
Pts: Pogoy 16; Rebs: K. Williams, M. Williams 7 Asts: Reyes, M. Williams 5	Pts: Standhardinger 17; Rebs: Standhardinger 19; Asts: three players 3
TNT wins series in one game

DHSVU Gym, Bacolor, Pampanga
Referees: Jimmy Mariano, Albert Nubla, Jeffrey Tantay, Bryan Peclaro

=== (2) Meralco vs (7) NLEX ===
Meralco has the twice-to-beat advantage; they have to be beaten twice, while their opponents just once, to advance.

One Sports

September 29
3:00 pm

Box score

Meralco Bolts 80, NLEX Road Warriors 81
Scoring by quarter: 26–20, 16–24, 22–19, 16–18
Pts: Maliksi 16; Rebs: Hodge 11; Asts: Newsome, Quinto 4	Pts: Semerad 23; Rebs: Oftana 9 Asts: Oftana 5

DHSVU Gym, Bacolor, Pampanga
Referees: Peter Balao, Rommel Gruta, Jerry Narandan, Kenny Hallig

One Sports

October 1
6:00 pm

Box score

Meralco Bolts 97, NLEX Road Warriors 86
Scoring by quarter: 22–21, 24–14, 22–25, 29–26
Pts: Newsome 23; Rebs: Hodge, Newsome 9 Asts: Caram, Newsome 6	Pts: Trollano 19; Rebs: Oftana 11; Asts: Alas 4
Meralco wins series in two games

DHSVU Gym, Bacolor, Pampanga
Referees: Jimmy Mariano, Sherwin Pineda, Mike Flordeliza, Bryan Peclaro

=== (3) Magnolia vs (6) Rain or Shine ===
This is a best-of-three playoff.

One Sports

September 26
2:00 pm

Box score

Magnolia Pambansang Manok Hotshots 81, Rain or Shine Elasto Painters 70
Scoring by quarter: 21–16, 16–26, 23–8, 21–20
Pts: Lee 20; Rebs: Abueva, Sangalang 13; Asts: Barroca 5	Pts: Santillan 17; Rebs: Santillan 12; Asts: Belga 6

DHSVU Gym, Bacolor, Pampanga
Referees: Nol Quilinguen, Janine Nicandro, Joel Baldago, Niño Barcenas

One Sports

September 30
4:35 pm

Box score

Magnolia Pambansang Manok Hotshots 96, Rain or Shine Elasto Painters 86
Scoring by quarter: 28–17, 21–24, 22–28, 25–17
Pts: Lee 24; Rebs: Abueva 19; Asts: Jalalon 6	Pts: Yap 16; Rebs: Belga, Santillan 6 Asts: Belga 5
Magnolia wins series, 2–0

DHSVU Gym, Bacolor, Pampanga
Referees: Peter Balao, Rommel Gruta, Jerry Narandan, Kenny Hallig

=== (4) San Miguel vs (5) NorthPort ===
This is a best-of-three playoff.

One Sports

September 26
4:35 pm

Box score

San Miguel Beermen 88, NorthPort Batang Pier 87
Scoring by quarter: 21–19, 23–24, 21–17, 23–27
Pts: Cabagnot 20; Rebs: Fajardo, Santos 11; Asts: Lassiter 9	Pts: Anthony 16; Rebs: Slaughter 10; Asts: Bolick 7

DHSVU Gym, Bacolor, Pampanga
Referees: Sherwin Pineda, Mike Flordeliza, Mao Orioste, Francis Bello

One Sports

September 30
2:00 pm

Box score

San Miguel Beermen 100, NorthPort Batang Pier 95
Scoring by quarter: 17–19, 29–20, 28–27, 26–29
Pts: Perez 21; Rebs: Santos 13; Asts: Ross 6	Pts: Slaughter 27; Rebs: Slaughter 12; Asts: Bolick 14
San Miguel wins series, 2–0

DHSVU Gym, Bacolor, Pampanga
Referees: Nol Quilinguen, Janine Nicandro, Joel Baldago, Niño Barcenas

== Semifinals ==
All match-ups are best-of-seven playoffs.

=== (1) TNT vs. (4) San Miguel ===
One Sports

October 3
4:35 pm

Box score

TNT Tropang Giga 89, San Miguel Beermen 88
Scoring by quarter: 19–17, 23–24, 29–19, 18–28
Pts: Pogoy 23; Rebs: M. Williams 8 Asts: Castro, M. Williams 6	Pts: Perez 23; Rebs: Fajardo 11; Asts: Fajardo, Ross 4

DHSVU Gym, Bacolor, Pampanga
Referees: Jimmy Mariano, Mike Flordeliza, Albert Nubla, Kenny Hallig

One Sports

October 6
3:00 pm

Box score

TNT Tropang Giga 96, San Miguel Beermen 98
Scoring by quarter: 31–23, 22–23, 29–21, 14–31
Pts: Pogoy 21; Rebs: Erram, Marcelo 10; Asts: M. Williams 7	Pts: Romeo 26; Rebs: Fajardo 10; Asts: Ross 5

DHSVU Gym, Bacolor, Pampanga
Referees: Sherwin Pineda, Rommel Gruta, Janine Nicandro, Bryan Peclaro

One Sports

October 8
6:00 pm

Box score

TNT Tropang Giga 115, San Miguel Beermen 98
Scoring by quarter: 29–20, 25–22, 31–26, 30–30
Pts: Pogoy 26; Rebs: Erram 13; Asts: M. Williams 5	Pts: Romeo 22; Rebs: Fajardo 10; Asts: Fajardo 4

DHSVU Gym, Bacolor, Pampanga
Referees: Jimmy Mariano, Mike Flordeliza, Albert Nubla, Jeffrey Tantay

One Sports

October 10
2:00 pm

Box score

TNT Tropang Giga 90, San Miguel Beermen 116
Scoring by quarter: 14–26, 18–31, 29–34, 29–25
Pts: Castro 15; Rebs: Marcelo 14; Asts: three players 4	Pts: Tautuaa 25; Rebs: Fajardo 15; Asts: Ross 9

DHSVU Gym, Bacolor, Pampanga
Referees: Jimmy Mariano, Mike Flordeliza, Albert Nubla, Jeffrey Tantay

One Sports

October 13
6:00 pm

Box score

TNT Tropang Giga 110, San Miguel Beermen 90
Scoring by quarter: 32–17, 29–18, 20–26, 29–29
Pts: Castro 19; Rebs: Rosario 8 Asts: Castro 8	Pts: Fajardo 23; Rebs: Fajardo 12; Asts: Ross 3

DHSVU Gym, Bacolor, Pampanga
Referees: Jimmy Mariano, Rommel Gruta, Mike Flordeliza, Kenny Hallig

One Sports

October 15
3:00 pm

Box score

TNT Tropang Giga 90, San Miguel Beermen 103
Scoring by quarter: 21–27, 17–26, 24–33, 28–17
Pts: Castro, Reyes 16; Rebs: Rosario 10; Asts: M. Williams 5	Pts: Tautuaa 24; Rebs: Fajardo 14; Asts: Romeo 6

DHSVU Gym, Bacolor, Pampanga
Referees: Nol Quilinguen, Rommel Gruta, Janine Nicandro, Bryan Peclaro

One Sports

October 17
4:35 pm

Box score

TNT Tropang Giga 97, San Miguel Beermen 79
Scoring by quarter: 15–23, 30–13, 22–19, 30–24
Pts: Pogoy 27; Rebs: Rosario 12; Asts: M. Williams 6	Pts: Fajardo 22; Rebs: Fajardo 16; Asts: Fajardo, Ross 3
TNT wins series, 4–3

DHSVU Gym, Bacolor, Pampanga
Referees: Jimmy Mariano, Sherwin Pineda, Mike Flordeliza, Albert Nubla

=== (2) Meralco vs. (3) Magnolia ===
One Sports

October 3
2:00 pm

Box score

Meralco Bolts 79, Magnolia Pambansang Manok Hotshots 88
Scoring by quarter: 17–22, 23–25, 24–14, 15–27
Pts: Quinto 14; Rebs: Hodge 8 Asts: Quinto 10	Pts: Sangalang 18; Rebs: Reavis 10; Asts: Barroca 6

DHSVU Gym, Bacolor, Pampanga
Referees: Nol Quilinguen, Joel Baldago, Janine Nicandro, Niño Barcenas

One Sports

October 6
6:00 pm

Box score

Meralco Bolts 78, Magnolia Pambansang Manok Hotshots 92
Scoring by quarter: 13–13, 23–25, 22–26, 20–28
Pts: Newsome 18; Rebs: Belo, Hugnatan 7 Asts: Newsome 7	Pts: Lee 28; Rebs: Abueva 11; Asts: Barroca 6

DHSVU Gym, Bacolor, Pampanga
Referees: Nol Quilinguen, Peter Balao, Joel Baldago, Kenny Hallig

One Sports

October 8
3:00 pm

Box score

Meralco Bolts 91, Magnolia Pambansang Manok Hotshots 86
Scoring by quarter: 24–14, 23–23, 26–17, 18–32
Pts: Newsome 17; Rebs: Hodge 12; Asts: Newsome, Quinto 4	Pts: Lee 18; Rebs: Abueva, Sangalang 7 Asts: Jalalon 9

DHSVU Gym, Bacolor, Pampanga
Referees: Sherwin Pineda, Rommel Gruta, Janine Nicandro, Bryan Peclaro

One Sports

October 10
4:35 pm

Box score

Meralco Bolts 69, Magnolia Pambansang Manok Hotshots 81
Scoring by quarter: 18–23, 17–23, 15–22, 19–13
Pts: Hugnatan 21; Rebs: Hugnatan 9 Asts: Newsome 8	Pts: three players 17; Rebs: Abueva 12; Asts: Barroca 6

DHSVU Gym, Bacolor, Pampanga
Referees: Nol Quilinguen, Peter Balao, Joel Baldago, Kenny Hallig

One Sports

October 13
3:00 pm

Box score

Meralco Bolts 102, Magnolia Pambansang Manok Hotshots 98
Scoring by quarter: 23–33, 22–14, 24–24, 33–27
Pts: Maliksi 29; Rebs: Almazan 10; Asts: Newsome 6	Pts: Barroca 25; Rebs: Sangalang 14; Asts: Abueva 6

DHSVU Gym, Bacolor, Pampanga
Referees: Nol Quilinguen, Sherwin Pineda, Jeffrey Tantay, Bryan Peclaro

One Sports

October 15
6:00 pm

Box score

Meralco Bolts 85, Magnolia Pambansang Manok Hotshots 93
Scoring by quarter: 27–20, 13–24, 28–28, 17–21
Pts: Almazan 16; Rebs: Almazan 12; Asts: Hodge, Newsome 6	Pts: Sangalang 19; Rebs: Sangalang 14; Asts: Sangalang 6
Magnolia wins series, 4–2

DHSVU Gym, Bacolor, Pampanga
Referees: Jimmy Mariano, Sherwin Pineda, Mike Flordeliza, Albert Nubla

== Finals ==
The Finals is a best-of-seven playoff.

One Sports

October 20
6:00 pm

Box score

TNT Tropang Giga 88, Magnolia Pambansang Manok Hotshots 70

DHSVU Gym, Bacolor, Pampanga

One Sports

October 22
6:00 pm

Box score

TNT Tropang Giga 105, Magnolia Pambansang Manok Hotshots 93

DHSVU Gym, Bacolor, Pampanga

One Sports

October 24
4:35 pm

Box score

TNT Tropang Giga 98, Magnolia Pambansang Manok Hotshots 106

DHSVU Gym, Bacolor, Pampanga

One Sports

October 27
6:00 pm

Box score

TNT Tropang Giga 106, Magnolia Pambansang Manok Hotshots 89

DHSVU Gym, Bacolor, Pampanga

One Sports

October 29
6:00 pm

Box score

TNT Tropang Giga 94, Magnolia Pambansang Manok Hotshots 79
TNT wins series, 4–1

DHSVU Gym, Bacolor, Pampanga

== Awards ==
=== Players of the Week ===
Week	Player	Ref.
July 16–18	Rey Nambatac (Rain or Shine Elasto Painters)	
July 19–25	Ian Sangalang (Magnolia Pambansang Manok Hotshots)	
July 26 – August 1	Troy Rosario (TNT Tropang Giga)	
September 1–5	Juami Tiongson (Terrafirma Dyip)	
September 8–12	Robert Bolick (NorthPort Batang Pier)	
September 15–19	Paul Lee (Magnolia Hotshots)	
September 22–26	CJ Perez (San Miguel Beermen)	
September 29 – October 3	Calvin Abueva (Magnolia Pambansang Manok Hotshots)	
October 4–11	Ian Sangalang (Magnolia Pambansang Manok Hotshots)	
October 13–17	Mikey Williams (TNT Tropang Giga)	

== Statistics ==
=== Individual statistical leaders ===
Category	Player	Team	Statistic
Points per game	Terrence Romeo	San Miguel Beermen	19.0
Rebounds per game	Christian Standhardinger	Barangay Ginebra San Miguel	10.8
Assists per game	Robert Bolick	NorthPort Batang Pier	7.3
Steals per game	Chris Ross	San Miguel Beermen	2.3
Blocks per game	Greg Slaughter	NorthPort Batang Pier	2.3
Turnovers per game	Matthew Wright	Phoenix Super LPG Fuel Masters	3.6
Fouls per game	Calvin Abueva	Magnolia Pambansang Manok Hotshots	4.6
Minutes per game	Robert Bolick	NorthPort Batang Pier	38.9
FG%	Raul Soyud	NLEX Road Warriors	57.6%
FT%	Marcio Lassiter	San Miguel Beermen	93.8%
3FG%	Troy Rike	NorthPort Batang Pier	55.6%
Double-doubles	June Mar Fajardo	San Miguel Beermen	15
Triple-doubles	Robert Bolick	NorthPort Batang Pier	1

=== Individual game highs ===
Category	Player	Team	Statistic
Points	Mikey Williams	TNT Tropang Giga	39
Rebounds	Christian Standhardinger (twice)	Barangay Ginebra San Miguel	19
Rebounds	Calvin Abueva	Magnolia Pambansang Manok Hotshots	19
Assists	Robert Bolick	NorthPort Batang Pier	14
Steals	Chris Newsome	Meralco Bolts	6
Steals	Chris Ross	San Miguel Beermen	6
Blocks	Greg Slaughter	NorthPort Batang Pier	6
Three point field goals	Mikey Williams	TNT Tropang Giga	10

=== Team statistical leaders ===
Category	Team	Statistic
Points per game	San Miguel Beermen	96.8
Rebounds per game	NorthPort Batang Pier	49.1
Assists per game	Phoenix Super LPG Fuel Masters	19.9
Steals per game	TNT Tropang Giga	8.7
Blocks per game	NorthPort Batang Pier	5.3
Turnovers per game	Meralco Bolts	17.2
Fouls per game	Magnolia Pambansang Manok Hotshots	25.3
FG%	San Miguel Beermen	44.0%
FT%	NLEX Road Warriors	73.9%
3FG%	Alaska Aces	33.0%
