= 2021 PBA Governors' Cup =

Second conference of the 2021 PBA season

- Duration: December 8–26, 2021 (before suspension); February 11 – April 22, 2022 (resumption)
- TV partner(s): Local: One Sports; TV5; PBA Rush (HD); International: AksyonTV International

Finals
- Champions: Barangay Ginebra San Miguel
- Runners-up: Meralco Bolts

Awards
- Best Player: Scottie Thompson (Barangay Ginebra San Miguel)
- Best Import: Justin Brownlee (Barangay Ginebra San Miguel)
- Finals MVP: Scottie Thompson (Barangay Ginebra San Miguel)

PBA Governors' Cup chronology
- < 2019 2023 >

PBA conference chronology
- < 2021 Philippine 2022 Philippine >

The 2021 PBA Governors' Cup, also known as the 2021 Honda PBA Governors' Cup for sponsorship reasons, was the second and last conference of the 2021 PBA season of the Philippine Basketball Association (PBA). The 20th edition of the Governors' Cup began on December 8, 2021, after the Inter-Agency Task Force for the Management of Emerging Infectious Diseases (IATF-EID) approved the league's request, and ended on April 22, 2022. The tournament allows teams to hire foreign players or imports with a height limit of 6 feet 6 inches (1.98 m).

This was the first import-laced tournament held by the league since the 2019 PBA Governors' Cup.

For the first two weeks of the tournament, the league returned to the Ynares Sports Arena with no audience in the venue. Quezon City then gave the permission for sports events to be held there with spectators; the PBA is expected to play at the Araneta Coliseum for the rest of the tournament starting December 15.

On January 3, 2022, the league postponed its scheduled games from January 5 to 9 after Metro Manila was put on Alert Level 3 due to the rising COVID-19 cases. The tournament was subsequently postponed indefinitely on January 6. The tournament resumed on February 11 after the alert level in Metro Manila was downgraded to Alert Level 2. The games were temporarily moved to the Ynares Center from February 23 to 27 as the Araneta Coliseum was used for the February window of the 2023 FIBA Basketball World Cup qualification.

== Format ==
The following format will be observed for the duration of the conference:

- Single round-robin eliminations; 11 games per team; Teams are then seeded by basis on win–loss records.
- Top eight teams will advance to the quarterfinals. In case of tie, playoff games will be held only for the #8 seed.
- Quarterfinals:
  - QF1: #1 vs #8 (#1 twice-to-beat)
  - QF2: #2 vs #7 (#2 twice-to-beat)
  - QF3: #3 vs #6 (#3 twice-to-beat)
  - QF4: #4 vs #5 (#4 twice-to-beat)
- Semifinals (best-of-5 series):
  - SF1: QF1 Winner vs. QF4 Winner
  - SF2: QF2 Winner vs. QF3 Winner
- Finals (best-of-7 series)
  - F1: SF1 Winner vs SF2 Winner

== Elimination round ==
=== Team standings ===
Pos	Team	W	L	PCT	GB	Qualification
1	Magnolia Pambansang Manok Hotshots	9	2	.818	—	Twice-to-beat in quarterfinals
2	NLEX Road Warriors	8	3	.727	1	Twice-to-beat in quarterfinals
3	TNT Tropang Giga	7	4	.636 (Note: Head-to-head quotient: TNT 1.07, Meralco 0.99, San Miguel 0.95)	2	Twice-to-beat in quarterfinals
4	Meralco Bolts	7	4	.636	2	Twice-to-beat in quarterfinals
5	San Miguel Beermen	7	4	.636	2	Twice-to-win in quarterfinals
6	Barangay Ginebra San Miguel	6	5	.545 (Note: Head-to-head record: Barangay Ginebra 1–0 Alaska)	3	Twice-to-win in quarterfinals
7	Alaska Aces	6	5	.545	3	Twice-to-win in quarterfinals
8	Phoenix Super LPG Fuel Masters	5	6	.455 (Note: Eighth seed playoff: Phoenix 101–98 NorthPort)	4	Twice-to-win in quarterfinals
9	NorthPort Batang Pier	5	6	.455	4	
10	Rain or Shine Elasto Painters	3	8	.273	6	
11	Terrafirma Dyip	2	9	.182	7	
12	Blackwater Bossing	1	10	.091	8	

Source: PBA.ph
Rules for classification: 1) winning percentage; 2) if two teams are tied, head-to-head record; if three or more teams are tied, head-to-head goal average (quotient), if tied for 8th, one-game playoff; 3) overall quotient 4) coin toss

=== Schedule ===
Team ╲ Game	1	2	3	4	5	6	7	8	9	10	11
Alaska Aces	NP	SMB	BGSM	TNT	BWB	ROS	TER	NLEX	MER	PHX	MAG
Barangay Ginebra San Miguel	ALA	NP	PHX	MAG	MER	TNT	SMB	BWB	TER	NLEX	ROS
Blackwater Bossing	ROS	PHX	MER	SMB	ALA	TER	NLEX	BGSM	NP	TNT	MAG
Magnolia Pambansang Manok Hotshots	TER	ROS	BGSM	TNT	NLEX	PHX	NP	SMB	MER	ALA	BWB
Meralco Bolts	BWB	TNT	NLEX	BGSM	NP	ROS	TER	ALA	MAG	SMB	PHX
NLEX Road Warriors	SMB	NP	TNT	TER	PHX	MER	MAG	BWB	ALA	ROS	BGSM
NorthPort Batang Pier	ALA	NLEX	SMB	BGSM	ROS	MER	MAG	PHX	BWB	TER	TNT
Phoenix Super LPG Fuel Masters	TER	BWB	ROS	BGSM	NLEX	TNT	MAG	SMB	NP	ALA	MER
Rain or Shine Elasto Painters	BWB	TER	PHX	MAG	TNT	NP	ALA	MER	NLEX	SMB	BGSM
San Miguel Beermen	NLEX	ALA	NP	BWB	TER	TNT	BGSM	PHX	MAG	ROS	MER
Terrafirma Dyip	PHX	ROS	MAG	NLEX	SMB	BWB	ALA	MER	BGSM	NP	TNT
TNT Tropang Giga	NLEX	ALA	MER	ROS	MAG	PHX	SMB	BGSM	BWB	TER	NP

Source: PBA.ph
= Win; = OT win; = Loss; = OT loss

=== Results ===
Teams	ALA	BGSM	BWB	MAG	MER	NLEX	NP	PHX	ROS	SMB	TER	TNT
Alaska	—	77–80	98–75	91–118	94–93	89–106	87–85	99–104	80–74	99–94	102–97	77–81
Barangay Ginebra		—	109–100	94–117	95–101	103–115	108–82	125–121*	104–93	102–110	112–107	92–119
Blackwater			—	101–100	77–98	97–117	103–116	99–110	79–92	88–107	103–109	93–106
Magnolia				—	88–85	112–109	101–103	103–83	109–98	104–87	114–87	96–93
Meralco					—	110–100	98–109	109–90	93–88	110–115	107–95	83–80
NLEX						—	120–115*	93–102	109–100*	114–102	116–86	102–100
NorthPort							—	101–93	90–104	88–91	124–117	101–106*
Phoenix								—	88–90	99–104	103–100	93–92
Rain or Shine									—	100–104	106–112*	92–95
San Miguel										—	100–88	81–96
Terrafirma											—	107–127
TNT												—

Source: PBA.ph results, PBA.ph schedule
Legend: Blue = left column team win; Red = top row team win.
Matches with lighter background shading were decided after overtime.

== Eighth seed playoff ==
One Sports

March 13, 2022
6:30 pm

Box score

Phoenix Super LPG Fuel Masters 101, NorthPort Batang Pier 98
Scoring by quarter: 18–31, 28–24, 30–24, 25–19
Pts: Maxwell 31; Rebs: Maxwell 13; Asts: Maxwell, Wright 5	Pts: Artis 21; Rebs: Artis 12; Asts: Bolick 7

Araneta Coliseum
Referees: Peter Balao, Bing Oliva, Albert Nubla, Gomer Obina

== Bracket ==
Quarterfinals (Top 4 twice-to-beat)
1	Magnolia	127
8	Phoenix Super LPG	88
4	Meralco	100
5	San Miguel	85
2	NLEX	79	96
7	Alaska	93	80
3	TNT	92	95
6	Barangay Ginebra	104	115

Semifinals (Best-of-5)
1	Magnolia	2
4	Meralco	3
2	NLEX	1
6	Barangay Ginebra	3

Finals (Best-of-7)
4	Meralco	2
6	Barangay Ginebra	4

== Quarterfinals ==
All match-ups have the higher-seeded team having the twice-to-beat advantage, where they have to be beaten twice, and their opponents just once, to advance.

=== (1) Magnolia vs. (8) Phoenix Super LPG ===
One Sports

March 18, 2022
6:00 pm

Box score

Magnolia Pambansang Manok Hotshots 127, Phoenix Super LPG Fuel Masters 88
Scoring by quarter: 34–20, 32–26, 36–21, 25–21
Pts: Lee 25; Rebs: Abueva 9 Asts: Barroca 7	Pts: Maxwell 32; Rebs: Maxwell, Perkins 9 Asts: Wright 8
Magnolia wins series in one game

Araneta Coliseum, Quezon City
Referees: Peter Balao, Rey Yante, Bing Oliva, Tom Mendoza

=== (2) NLEX vs (7) Alaska ===
One Sports

March 16, 2022
3:00 pm

Box score

NLEX Road Warriors 79, Alaska Aces 93
Scoring by quarter: 26–12, 12–28, 17–24, 24–29
Pts: Clark 25; Rebs: Clark 16; Asts: Alas 4	Pts: St. Fort 17; Rebs: St. Fort 14; Asts: three players 3

Araneta Coliseum, Quezon City
Attendance: 7,091
Referees: Nol Quilingen, Mike Flordeliza, Albert Nubla, Niño Cortez

One Sports

March 19, 2022
6:30 pm

Box score

NLEX Road Warriors 96, Alaska Aces 80
Scoring by quarter: 21–20, 25–11, 25–21, 25–28
Pts: Clark 24; Rebs: Soyud 9 Asts: Alas 4	Pts: St. Fort 14; Rebs: St. Fort 7 Asts: three players 3
NLEX wins series in two games

Araneta Coliseum, Quezon City
Attendance: 10,486
Referees: Jimmy Mariano, Rommel Gruta, Janine Nicandro, Tom Mendoza

=== (3) TNT vs (6) Barangay Ginebra ===
One Sports

March 16, 2022
6:00 pm

Box score

TNT Tropang Giga 92, Barangay Ginebra San Miguel 104
Scoring by quarter: 14–28, 31–22, 25–21, 22–33
Pts: Fuller 22; Rebs: Fuller 19; Asts: Castro 5	Pts: Brownlee 38; Rebs: Thompson 15; Asts: Thompson 8

Araneta Coliseum, Quezon City
Attendance: 7,091
Referees: Jimmy Mariano, Mardy Montoya, Joel Baldago, Bryan Peclaro

One Sports

March 19, 2022
4:00 pm

Box score

TNT Tropang Giga 95, Barangay Ginebra San Miguel 115
Scoring by quarter: 29–25, 19–34, 26–37, 21–19
Pts: M. Williams 17; Rebs: Pogoy, Rosario 5 Asts: M. Williams 6	Pts: Brownlee 29; Rebs: Brownlee 18; Asts: Thompson 9
Barangay Ginebra wins series in two games

Araneta Coliseum, Quezon City
Attendance: 10,486
Referees: Nol Quilingen, Sherwin Pineda, Mike Flordeliza, Albert Nubla

=== (4) Meralco vs (5) San Miguel ===
One Sports

March 18, 2022
3:00 pm

Box score

Meralco Bolts 100, San Miguel Beermen 85
Scoring by quarter: 26–26, 22–14, 31–21, 21–24
Pts: Bishop 32; Rebs: Bishop 16; Asts: Quinto 5	Pts: Muhammad 24; Rebs: Muhammad 15; Asts: Ross 7
Meralco wins series in one game

Araneta Coliseum, Quezon City
Referees: Sherwin Pineda, Rommel Gruta, Joel Baldago, Niño Cortez

== Semifinals ==
All match-ups are best-of-five playoffs.

=== (1) Magnolia vs. (4) Meralco ===
One Sports

March 23, 2022
3:00 pm

Box score

Magnolia Pambansang Manok Hotshots 94, Meralco Bolts 80
Scoring by quarter: 12–22, 23–21, 29–13, 30–24
Pts: Harris 26; Rebs: Harris 16; Asts: Jalalon 6	Pts: Banchero 16; Rebs: Bishop 12; Asts: Quinto 4

SM Mall of Asia Arena, Pasay
Referees: Nol Quilinguen, Rommel Gruta, Janine Nicandro, Tom Mendoza

One Sports

March 25, 2022
6:00 pm

Box score

Magnolia Pambansang Manok Hotshots 75, Meralco Bolts 81
Scoring by quarter: 15–20, 22–22, 24–24, 14–15
Pts: Harris 25; Rebs: Harris 17; Asts: Jalalon 6	Pts: Bishop 22; Rebs: Bishop 14; Asts: Black 4

SM Mall of Asia Arena, Pasay
Referees: Jimmy Mariano, Bing Oliva, Albert Nubla, Joel Baldago

One Sports

March 27, 2022
4:00 pm

Box score

Magnolia Pambansang Manok Hotshots 95, Meralco Bolts 101
Scoring by quarter: 19–24, 31–22, 22–30, 23–25
Pts: Harris 24; Rebs: Harris 17; Asts: Barroca 6	Pts: Bishop 27; Rebs: Bishop 10; Asts: Banchero, Newsome 5

SM Mall of Asia Arena, Pasay
Attendance: 13,272
Referees: Peter Balao, Rey Yante, Mardy Montoya, Mike Flordeliza

One Sports

March 30, 2022
6:00 pm

Box score

Magnolia Pambansang Manok Hotshots 94, Meralco Bolts 73
Scoring by quarter: 20–19, 22–11, 20–22, 32–21
Pts: Harris 34; Rebs: Harris 18; Asts: Jalalon 7	Pts: Bishop 22; Rebs: Bishop 16; Asts: Newsome 5

Araneta Coliseum, Quezon City
Attendance: 10,353
Referees: Peter Balao, Sherwin Pineda, Janine Nicandro, Albert Nubla

One Sports

April 1, 2022
6:00 pm

Box score

Magnolia Pambansang Manok Hotshots 81, Meralco Bolts 94
Scoring by quarter: 29–23, 17–18, 19–21, 16–32
Pts: Abueva 21; Rebs: Harris 11; Asts: Jalalon 6	Pts: Maliksi 24; Rebs: Bishop, Newsome 8 Asts: Newsome 12
Meralco wins series, 3–2

Araneta Coliseum, Quezon City
Referees: Nol Quilingen, Sherwin Pineda, Mardy Montoya, Albert Nubla

=== (2) NLEX vs. (6) Barangay Ginebra ===
One Sports

March 23, 2022
6:00 pm

Box score

NLEX Road Warriors 86, Barangay Ginebra San Miguel 95
Scoring by quarter: 29–23, 16–20, 19–27, 22–25
Pts: Clark 30; Rebs: Clark 13; Asts: Alas 5	Pts: Brownlee 27; Rebs: Brownlee 14; Asts: Brownlee, Tenorio 6

SM Mall of Asia Arena, Pasay
Referees: Jimmy Mariano, Rey Yante, Bing Oliva, Mardy Montoya

One Sports

March 25, 2022
3:00 pm

Box score

NLEX Road Warriors 94, Barangay Ginebra San Miguel 104
Scoring by quarter: 27–24, 22–31, 17–27, 28–22
Pts: Nieto 19; Rebs: Trollano 6 Asts: Alas 5	Pts: Brownlee 32; Rebs: Thompson 12; Asts: Tenorio 7

SM Mall of Asia Arena, Pasay
Referees: Peter Balao, Sherwin Pineda, Mike Flordeliza, Niño Cortez

One Sports

March 27, 2022
6:30 pm

Box score

NLEX Road Warriors 86, Barangay Ginebra San Miguel 85
Scoring by quarter: 16–19, 20–25, 23–18, 27–23
Pts: Clark 21; Rebs: Clark 17; Asts: Alas, Clark 4	Pts: Brownlee 27; Rebs: Standhardinger 16; Asts: Tenorio 9

SM Mall of Asia Arena, Pasay
Attendance: 13,272
Referees: Nol Quilingen, Sherwin Pineda, Rommel Gruta, Tom Mendoza

One Sports

March 30, 2022
3:00 pm

Box score

NLEX Road Warriors 93, Barangay Ginebra San Miguel 112
Scoring by quarter: 22–22, 28–31, 21–31, 22–28
Pts: Clark 34; Rebs: Clark 12; Asts: Alas 6	Pts: Brownlee 47; Rebs: Standhardinger 11; Asts: Standhardinger 7
Barangay Ginebra wins series, 3–1

Araneta Coliseum, Quezon City
Attendance: 10,353
Referees: Nol Quilingen, Rey Yante, Mike Flordeliza, Tom Mendoza

== Finals ==
The Finals is a best-of-seven playoff.

One Sports

April 6, 2022
6:00 pm

Box score

Meralco Bolts 104, Barangay Ginebra San Miguel 91

Araneta Coliseum, Quezon City

One Sports

April 8, 2022
6:00 pm

Box score

Meralco Bolts 93, Barangay Ginebra San Miguel 99

SM Mall of Asia Arena, Pasay

One Sports

April 10, 2022
6:30 pm

Box score

Meralco Bolts 83, Barangay Ginebra San Miguel 74

SM Mall of Asia Arena, Pasay

One Sports

April 13, 2022
6:00 pm

Box score

Meralco Bolts 84, Barangay Ginebra San Miguel 95

Araneta Coliseum, Quezon City

One Sports

April 17, 2022
6:30 pm

Box score

Meralco Bolts 110, Barangay Ginebra San Miguel 115

Araneta Coliseum, Quezon City

One Sports

April 22, 2022
6:00 pm

Box score

Meralco Bolts 92, Barangay Ginebra San Miguel 103
Barangay Ginebra wins series, 4–2

SM Mall of Asia Arena, Pasay

== Imports ==
The following is the list of imports, which had played for their respective teams at least once, with the returning imports in italics. Highlighted are the imports who stayed with their respective teams for the whole conference.

Team	Name	Debuted	Last game	Record
Alaska Aces	(Nigeria) Olu Ashaolu	December 8 (vs. NorthPort)	March 6 (vs. Magnolia)	6–5
Alaska Aces	(The Bahamas) Mark St. Fort	March 16 (vs. NLEX)	March 19 (vs. NLEX)	1–1
Barangay Ginebra San Miguel	(United States) Justin Brownlee	December 12 (vs. Alaska)	April 22 (vs. Meralco)	15–8
Blackwater Bossing	(United States) Jaylen Bond	December 9 (vs. Rain or Shine)	December 22 (vs. Alaska)	0–5
Blackwater Bossing	(United States) Shawn Glover	February 12 (vs. Terrafirma)	March 9 (vs. Magnolia)	1–5
Magnolia Pambansang Manok Hotshots	(United States) Mike Harris	December 15 (vs. Terrafirma)	April 1 (vs. Meralco)	12–5
Meralco Bolts	(Panama) Tony Bishop	December 16 (vs. Blackwater)	April 22 (vs. Barangay Ginebra)	13–10
NLEX Road Warriors	(United States) K. J. McDaniels	December 8 (vs. San Miguel)	March 4 (vs. Barangay Ginebra)	8–3
NLEX Road Warriors	(United States) Cameron Clark	March 16 (vs. Alaska)	March 30 (vs. Barangay Ginebra)	2–4
NorthPort Batang Pier	(United States) Cameron Forte	December 8 (vs. Alaska)	December 10 (vs. NLEX)	0–2
NorthPort Batang Pier	No import	December 12 (vs. San Miguel), December 15 (vs. Barangay Ginebra)		0–2
NorthPort Batang Pier	(United States) Jamel Artis	February 12 (vs. Rain or Shine)	March 13 (vs. Phoenix)	5–3
Phoenix Super LPG Fuel Masters	(United States) Paul Harris	December 9 (vs. Terrafirma)	December 25 (vs. NLEX)	3–2
Phoenix Super LPG Fuel Masters	(United States) Dominique Sutton	February 13 (vs. TNT)	February 26 (vs. NorthPort)	1–3
Phoenix Super LPG Fuel Masters	(United States) Du'Vaughn Maxwell	March 3 (vs. Alaska)	March 18 (vs. Magnolia)	2–2
Rain or Shine Elasto Painters	(United States) Henry Walker	December 9 (vs. Blackwater)	March 6 (vs. Barangay Ginebra)	3–8
San Miguel Beermen	(United States) Brandon Brown	December 8 (vs. NLEX)	December 26 (vs. Terrafirma)	3–2
San Miguel Beermen	(United States) Orlando Johnson	February 16 (vs. TNT)	February 23 (vs. Phoenix)	2–1
San Miguel Beermen	(United States) Shabazz Muhammad	February 27 (vs. Magnolia)	March 18 (vs. Meralco)	2–2
Terrafirma Dyip	(United States) Antonio Hester	December 9 (vs. Phoenix)	March 9 (vs. TNT)	2–9
TNT Tropang Giga	(United States) McKenzie Moore	December 15 (vs. NLEX)	December 22 (vs. Meralco)	1–2
TNT Tropang Giga	(United States) Aaron Fuller	December 26 (vs. Rain or Shine)	March 16 (vs. Barangay Ginebra)	6–3
TNT Tropang Giga	(United States) Leon Gilmore III	March 19 (vs. Barangay Ginebra)		0–1

== Awards ==
=== Players of the Week ===
Week	Player	Ref.
December 8–12	Kevin Alas (NLEX Road Warriors)	
December 15–19	Arvin Tolentino (Barangay Ginebra San Miguel)	
December 22–26	Matthew Wright (Phoenix Super LPG Fuel Masters)	
February 11–13, 2022	Matthew Wright (Phoenix Super LPG Fuel Masters)	
February 16–20, 2022	Jeron Teng (Alaska Aces)	
February 23–27, 2022	Jamie Malonzo (NorthPort Batang Pier)	
March 2–6, 2022	Robert Bolick (NorthPort Batang Pier)	
March 9–13, 2022	Mikey Williams (TNT Tropang Giga)	
March 16–19, 2022	Scottie Thompson (Barangay Ginebra San Miguel)	
March 23–27, 2022	Christian Standhardinger (Barangay Ginebra San Miguel)	
March 30–April 1, 2022	Chris Newsome (Meralco Bolts)	

== Statistics ==
=== Individual statistical leaders ===
==== Local players ====
Category	Player	Team	Statistic
Points per game	Robert Bolick	NorthPort Batang Pier	22.1
Rebounds per game	June Mar Fajardo	San Miguel Beermen	11.2
Assists per game	Robert Bolick	NorthPort Batang Pier	8.8
Steals per game	Robert Bolick	NorthPort Batang Pier	2.2
Blocks per game	Arwind Santos	NorthPort Batang Pier	1.8
Turnovers per game	Robert Bolick	NorthPort Batang Pier	3.4
Fouls per game	Beau Belga	Rain or Shine Elasto Painters	4.1
Minutes per game	Robert Bolick	NorthPort Batang Pier	43.7
FG%	Jackson Corpuz	Magnolia Pambansang Manok Hotshots	62.5%
FT%	RK Ilagan	Alaska Aces	100.0%
3FG%	Adrian Wong	Magnolia Pambansang Manok Hotshots	56.5%
Double-doubles	Scottie Thompson	Barangay Ginebra San Miguel	11
Triple-doubles	Scottie Thompson	Barangay Ginebra San Miguel	2

==== Import players ====
Category	Player	Team	Statistic
Points per game	Shabazz Muhammad	San Miguel Beermen	39.0
Rebounds per game	Shabazz Muhammad	San Miguel Beermen	19.0
Assists per game	Justin Brownlee	Barangay Ginebra San Miguel	5.9
Steals per game	K. J. McDaniels	NLEX Road Warriors	1.5
Steals per game	Antonio Hester	Terrafirma Dyip	1.5
Blocks per game	K. J. McDaniels	NLEX Road Warriors	2.8
Turnovers per game	K. J. McDaniels	NLEX Road Warriors	3.8
Fouls per game	Henry Walker	Rain or Shine Elasto Painters	3.5
Minutes per game	Jamel Artis	NorthPort Batang Pier	47.3
FG%	Olu Ashaolu	Alaska Aces	55.8%
FT%	Justin Brownlee	Barangay Ginebra San Miguel	88.5%
3FG%	Tony Bishop	Meralco Bolts	45.9%
Double-doubles	Tony Bishop	Meralco Bolts	14
Triple-doubles	three players		1

=== Individual game highs ===
==== Local players ====
Category	Player	Team	Statistic
Points	Robert Bolick	NorthPort Batang Pier	32
Points	Allein Maliksi	Meralco Bolts	32
Rebounds	Christian Standhardinger	Barangay Ginebra San Miguel	17
Rebounds	Scottie Thompson	Barangay Ginebra San Miguel	17
Assists	Robert Bolick	NorthPort Batang Pier	17
Steals	Matthew Wright	Phoenix Super LPG Fuel Masters	6
Blocks	three players		4
Three point field goals	Ryan Reyes	TNT Tropang Giga	8
Three point field goals	JVee Casio	Blackwater Bossing	8

==== Import players ====
Category	Player	Team	Statistic
Points	Shabazz Muhammad	San Miguel Beermen	57
Rebounds	Aaron Fuller	TNT Tropang Giga	26
Assists	Antonio Hester	Terrafirma Dyip	11
Assists	Justin Brownlee	Barangay Ginebra San Miguel	11
Steals	Cameron Clark	NLEX Road Warriors	5
Steals	Justin Brownlee	Barangay Ginebra San Miguel	5
Blocks	three players		6
Three point field goals	four players		6

=== Team statistical leaders ===
Category	Team	Statistic
Points per game	NLEX Road Warriors	109.2
Rebounds per game	Alaska Aces	48.9
Assists per game	Barangay Ginebra San Miguel	25.7
Steals per game	Magnolia Pambansang Manok Hotshots	8.9
Blocks per game	NLEX Road Warriors	5.0
Turnovers per game	Alaska Aces	16.8
Fouls per game	Blackwater Bossing	24.9
FG%	Magnolia Pambansang Manok Hotshots	48.1%
FT%	Magnolia Pambansang Manok Hotshots	78.1%
3FG%	Magnolia Pambansang Manok Hotshots	35.9%

== Final rankings ==
Pos	Team	Pld	W	L	Best finish
1	Barangay Ginebra San Miguel (C)	23	15	8	Champion
2	Meralco Bolts	23	13	10	Runner-up
3	Magnolia Pambansang Manok Hotshots	17	12	5	Semifinalist
4	NLEX Road Warriors	17	10	7	Semifinalist
5	TNT Tropang Giga	13	7	6	Quarterfinalist
6	San Miguel Beermen	12	7	5	Quarterfinalist
7	Alaska Aces	13	7	6	Quarterfinalist
8	Phoenix Super LPG Fuel Masters	13	6	7	Quarterfinalist
9	NorthPort Batang Pier	12	5	7	Elimination round
10	Rain or Shine Elasto Painters	11	3	8	Elimination round
11	Terrafirma Dyip	11	2	9	Elimination round
12	Blackwater Bossing	11	1	10	Elimination round

Rules for classification: 1) finals result, 2) elimination round seed of semifinalists, 3) elimination round seed of quarterfinalists, 4) elimination round finish
(C) Champions
