= 2021 San Miguel Beermen season =

- Head coach: Leo Austria
- Owner(s): San Miguel Brewery, Inc. (a San Miguel Corporation subsidiary)

Philippine Cup results
- Record: 7–4 (63.6%)
- Place: 4th
- Playoff finish: Semifinalist (lost to TNT, 3–4)

Governors' Cup results
- Record: 7–4 (63.6%)
- Place: 5th
- Playoff finish: Quarterfinalist (lost to Meralco with twice-to-win disadvantage)

San Miguel Beermen seasons

The 2021 San Miguel Beermen season was the 46th season of the franchise in the Philippine Basketball Association (PBA).

== Key dates ==
- March 14: The PBA season 46 draft was held at the TV5 Media Center in Mandaluyong.

== Draft picks ==
Round	Pick	Player	Position	Place of birth	College
3	32	Allen Enriquez	Forward	Philippines	Arellano
4	42	Mohammad Salim	Forward	Philippines	NU
5	51	Greg Flor	Forward	Philippines	PMMA
6	58	Jeffrey Manday	Forward	Philippines	CSAV
7	60	Luis Abaca	Guard	Philippines	Benilde

== Roster ==
2021 San Miguel Beermen roster
Players
Coaches

Pos.	#	POB	Name	Height	Weight	DOB (YYYY–MM–DD)	From
G	0	(United States)	Simon Enciso	5 ft 11 in (1.80 m)	185 lb (84 kg)	1991–02–12	Notre Dame de Namur
G/F	3	(Philippines)	Von Pessumal	6 ft 2 in (1.88 m)	185 lb (84 kg)	1993–02–12	Ateneo
G	6	(United States)	Chris Ross	6 ft 1 in (1.85 m)	180 lb (82 kg)	1985–03–09	Marshall
G	7	(Philippines)	Terrence Romeo	5 ft 11 in (1.80 m)	178 lb (81 kg)	1992–03–16	Far Eastern
G	12	(Philippines)	Paul Zamar	5 ft 10 in (1.78 m)	179 lb (81 kg)	1987–10–20	UE
G/F	13	(United States)	Marcio Lassiter	6 ft 2 in (1.88 m)	185 lb (84 kg)	1987–05–16	Cal State Fullerton
C	15	(Philippines)	June Mar Fajardo	6 ft 10 in (2.08 m)	268 lb (122 kg)	1989–11–17	Cebu
F/C	16	(Philippines)	Alfonzo Gotladera	6 ft 5 in (1.96 m)	240 lb (109 kg)	1992–02–16	Ateneo
F	27	(Philippines)	Riego Gamalinda	6 ft 3 in (1.91 m)	184 lb (83 kg)	1986–05–25	San Beda
F/C	33	(United States)	Moala Tautuaa	6 ft 8 in (2.03 m)	245 lb (111 kg)	1989–04–30	Chadron State
G	39	(Philippines)	Jericho Cruz	6 ft 1 in (1.85 m)	190 lb (86 kg)	1990–10–11	Adamson
G/F	77	(Hong Kong)	CJ Perez	6 ft 2 in (1.88 m)	185 lb (84 kg)	1993–11–17	Lyceum
F	87	(Philippines)	Vic Manuel	6 ft 4 in (1.93 m)	201 lb (91 kg)	1987–06–18	PSBA
F	91	(Philippines)	Rodney Brondial	6 ft 5 in (1.96 m)	210 lb (95 kg)	1990–11–20	Adamson

Head coach

- (Philippines) Leo Austria

Assistant coach(es)

- (Philippines) Peter Martin (1st assistant)
- (Philippines) Ato Agustin
- (Philippines) Dayong Mendoza
- (Philippines) Jorge Gallent
- (Philippines) Boyzie Zamar
- (Philippines) Biboy Ravanes

Team manager

- (Philippines) Gee Abanilla
- (Philippines) Daniel Henares (assistant)

Legend

- (C) Team captain
- (CI) Commissioner's Cup Import
- (GI) Governors' Cup Import
- (EI) EASL Import
- (DP) Unsigned draft pick
- (FA) Free agent
- (IN) Inactive
- (S) Suspended
- (R) Rookie
- Injured

Roster

== Philippine Cup ==
=== Eliminations ===
==== Standings ====
Pos	Team	W	L	PCT	GB	Qualification
1	TNT Tropang Giga	10	1	.909	—	Twice-to-beat in the quarterfinals
2	Meralco Bolts	9	2	.818	1	Twice-to-beat in the quarterfinals
3	Magnolia Pambansang Manok Hotshots	8	3	.727	2	Best-of-three quarterfinals
4	San Miguel Beermen	7	4	.636	3	Best-of-three quarterfinals
5	NorthPort Batang Pier	6	5	.545 (Note: Head-to-head record: NorthPort 1–0 Rain or Shine)	4	Best-of-three quarterfinals
6	Rain or Shine Elasto Painters	6	5	.545	4	Best-of-three quarterfinals
7	NLEX Road Warriors	5	6	.455	5	Twice-to-win in the quarterfinals
8	Barangay Ginebra San Miguel	4	7	.364 (Note: Head-to-head quotient: Phoenix 1.03, Barangay Ginebra 1.01, Terrafirma 0.96; eighth seed playoff: Barangay Ginebra 95–85 Phoenix)	6	Twice-to-win in the quarterfinals
9	Phoenix Super LPG Fuel Masters	4	7	.364	6	
10	Terrafirma Dyip	4	7	.364	6	
11	Alaska Aces	3	8	.273	7	
12	Blackwater Bossing	0	11	.000	10	

Source: PBA.ph
Rules for classification: 1) winning percentage; 2) if two teams are tied, head-to-head record; if three or more teams are tied, head-to-head goal average (quotient), if tied for 8th, one-game playoff; 3) overall quotient 4) coin toss

==== Game log ====
2021 PBA Philippine Cup game log
Total: 7–4
July: 3–1

Game	Date	Opponent	Score	High points	High rebounds	High assists	Location Attendance	Record
1	July 18	Meralco	L 87–93	Terrence Romeo (18)	Moala Tautuaa (10)	Chris Ross (6)	Ynares Sports Arena	0–1
2	July 23	NLEX	W 110–93	CJ Perez (21)	Arwind Santos (12)	Chris Ross (6)	Ynares Sports Arena	1–1
3	July 25	NorthPort	W 88–86	CJ Perez (18)	CJ Perez (8)	Alex Cabagnot (7)	Ynares Sports Arena	2–1
4	July 28	Blackwater	W 99–80	June Mar Fajardo (16)	Arwind Santos (12)	Arwind Santos (5)	Ynares Sports Arena	3–1

September: 4–3

Game	Date	Opponent	Score	High points	High rebounds	High assists	Location Attendance	Record
5	September 1	Terrafirma	L 104–110 (OT)	Terrence Romeo (28)	June Mar Fajardo (12)	Chris Ross (9)	DHVSU Gym	3–2
6	September 8	TNT	W 83–67	Marcio Lassiter (19)	June Mar Fajardo (17)	Romeo, Ross (4)	DHVSU Gym	4–2
7	September 10	Barangay Ginebra	W 111–102	Terrence Romeo (29)	June Mar Fajardo (10)	Terrence Romeo (6)	DHVSU Gym	5–2
8	September 12	Rain or Shine	L 93–95	Terrence Romeo (20)	Arwind Santos (12)	Romeo, Ross (6)	DHVSU Gym	5–3
9	September 17	Phoenix Super LPG	W 110–80	CJ Perez (24)	June Mar Fajardo (11)	Chris Ross (8)	DHVSU Gym	6–3
10	September 19	Magnolia	L 90–100	CJ Perez (20)	Fajardo, Perez, Santos (7)	Chris Ross (5)	DHVSU Gym	6–4
11	September 22	Alaska	W 101–100	CJ Perez (20)	June Mar Fajardo (10)	June Mar Fajardo (6)	DHVSU Gym	7–4

=== Playoffs ===
==== Bracket ====
Quarterfinals
(#1 twice-to-beat)
1	TNT	84
8	Barangay Ginebra	71
(Best-of-3)
4	San Miguel	2
5	NorthPort	0
(#2 twice-to-beat)
2	Meralco	80	97
7	NLEX	81	86
(Best-of-3)
3	Magnolia	2
6	Rain or Shine	0

Semifinals (Best-of-7)
1	TNT	4
4	San Miguel	3
2	Meralco	2
3	Magnolia	4

Finals (Best-of-7)
1	TNT	4
3	Magnolia	1

==== Game log ====
2021 PBA Philippine Cup playoffs game log
Total: 5–4
Quarterfinals: 2–0

Game	Date	Opponent	Score	High points	High rebounds	High assists	Location Attendance	Series
1	September 26	NorthPort	W 88–87	Alex Cabagnot (20)	Fajardo, Santos (11)	Marcio Lassiter (9)	DHVSU Gym	1–0
2	September 30	NorthPort	W 100–95	CJ Perez (21)	Arwind Santos (13)	Chris Ross (6)	DHVSU Gym	2–0

Semifinals: 3–4

Game	Date	Opponent	Score	High points	High rebounds	High assists	Location Attendance	Series
1	October 3	TNT	L 88–89	CJ Perez (23)	June Mar Fajardo (11)	Fajardo, Ross (4)	DHVSU Gym	0–1
2	October 6	TNT	W 98–96	Terrence Romeo (26)	June Mar Fajardo (10)	Chris Ross (5)	DHVSU Gym	1–1
3	October 8	TNT	L 98–115	Terrence Romeo (22)	June Mar Fajardo (10)	June Mar Fajardo (4)	DHVSU Gym	1–2
4	October 10	TNT	W 116–90	Moala Tautuaa (25)	June Mar Fajardo (12)	Chris Ross (9)	DHVSU Gym	2–2
5	October 13	TNT	L 90–110	June Mar Fajardo (23)	June Mar Fajardo (12)	Chris Ross (3)	DHVSU Gym	2–3
6	October 15	TNT	W 103–90	Moala Tautuaa (24)	June Mar Fajardo (14)	Terrence Romeo (6)	DHVSU Gym	3–3
7	October 17	TNT	L 79–97	June Mar Fajardo (22)	June Mar Fajardo (16)	Fajardo, Ross (3)	DHVSU Gym	3–4

== Governors' Cup ==
=== Eliminations ===
==== Standings ====
Pos	Team	W	L	PCT	GB	Qualification
1	Magnolia Pambansang Manok Hotshots	9	2	.818	—	Twice-to-beat in quarterfinals
2	NLEX Road Warriors	8	3	.727	1	Twice-to-beat in quarterfinals
3	TNT Tropang Giga	7	4	.636 (Note: Head-to-head quotient: TNT 1.07, Meralco 0.99, San Miguel 0.95)	2	Twice-to-beat in quarterfinals
4	Meralco Bolts	7	4	.636	2	Twice-to-beat in quarterfinals
5	San Miguel Beermen	7	4	.636	2	Twice-to-win in quarterfinals
6	Barangay Ginebra San Miguel	6	5	.545 (Note: Head-to-head record: Barangay Ginebra 1–0 Alaska)	3	Twice-to-win in quarterfinals
7	Alaska Aces	6	5	.545	3	Twice-to-win in quarterfinals
8	Phoenix Super LPG Fuel Masters	5	6	.455 (Note: Eighth seed playoff: Phoenix 101–98 NorthPort)	4	Twice-to-win in quarterfinals
9	NorthPort Batang Pier	5	6	.455	4	
10	Rain or Shine Elasto Painters	3	8	.273	6	
11	Terrafirma Dyip	2	9	.182	7	
12	Blackwater Bossing	1	10	.091	8	

Source: PBA.ph
Rules for classification: 1) winning percentage; 2) if two teams are tied, head-to-head record; if three or more teams are tied, head-to-head goal average (quotient), if tied for 8th, one-game playoff; 3) overall quotient 4) coin toss

=== Game log ===
2021 PBA Governors' Cup game log
Total: 7–4
December: 3–2

Game	Date	Opponent	Score	High points	High rebounds	High assists	Location Attendance	Record
1	December 8	NLEX	L 102–114	Brandon Brown (36)	Brandon Brown (13)	Brown, Romeo (3)	Ynares Sports Arena	0–1
2	December 10	Alaska	L 94–99	June Mar Fajardo (23)	June Mar Fajardo (15)	Terrence Romeo (6)	Ynares Sports Arena	0–2
3	December 12	NorthPort	W 91–88	Brandon Brown (24)	Brandon Brown (12)	Brown, Romeo (7)	Ynares Sports Arena	1–2
4	December 18	Blackwater	W 107–88	CJ Perez (21)	Brandon Brown (14)	Brandon Brown (5)	Smart Araneta Coliseum	2–2
5	December 26	Terrafirma	W 100–88	Brown, Romeo (23)	Brandon Brown (10)	Brown, Perez (5)	Smart Araneta Coliseum	3–2

February: 2–2

Game	Date	Opponent	Score	High points	High rebounds	High assists	Location Attendance	Record
6	February 16, 2022	TNT	L 81–96	June Mar Fajardo (22)	June Mar Fajardo (14)	Chris Ross (4)	Smart Araneta Coliseum	3–3
7	February 20, 2022	Barangay Ginebra	W 110–102	Orlando Johnson (31)	Fajardo, Johnson (10)	Orlando Johnson (8)	Smart Araneta Coliseum; 3,347	4–3
8	February 23, 2022	Phoenix Super LPG	W 104–99	Orlando Johnson (23)	June Mar Fajardo (15)	Orlando Johnson (5)	Ynares Center	5–3
9	February 27, 2022	Magnolia	L 87–104	Shabazz Muhammad (27)	Shabazz Muhammad (17)	Chris Ross (6)	Ynares Center; 3,561	5–4

March: 2–0

Game	Date	Opponent	Score	High points	High rebounds	High assists	Location Attendance	Record
10	March 3, 2022	Rain or Shine	W 104–100	Shabazz Muhammad (33)	Shabazz Muhammad (21)	Muhammad, Romeo, Ross (6)	Smart Araneta Coliseum	6–4
11	March 5, 2022	Meralco	W 115–110	Shabazz Muhammad (57)	Shabazz Muhammad (19)	Chris Ross (6)	Smart Araneta Coliseum	7–4

=== Playoffs ===
==== Bracket ====
Quarterfinals (Top 4 twice-to-beat)
1	Magnolia	127
8	Phoenix Super LPG	88
4	Meralco	100
5	San Miguel	85
2	NLEX	79	96
7	Alaska	93	80
3	TNT	92	95
6	Barangay Ginebra	104	115

Semifinals (Best-of-5)
1	Magnolia	2
4	Meralco	3
2	NLEX	1
6	Barangay Ginebra	3

Finals (Best-of-7)
4	Meralco	2
6	Barangay Ginebra	4

==== Game log ====
2021 PBA Governors' Cup playoffs game log
Total: 0–1
Quarterfinals: 0–1

Game	Date	Opponent	Score	High points	High rebounds	High assists	Location Attendance	Series
1	March 18, 2022	Meralco	L 85–100	Shabazz Muhammad (24)	Shabazz Muhammad (15)	Chris Ross (7)	Smart Araneta Coliseum	0–1

== Transactions ==
=== Free agency ===
==== Signings ====
Player	Date signed	Contract amount	Contract length	Former team
Alfonzo Gotladera	June 23, 2021	Not disclosed	1 year	Pasig Sta. Lucia Realtors (MPBL)
James Sena	June 23, 2021	Not disclosed	1 year	Blackwater Elite
Rodney Brondial	January 6, 2022	Not disclosed	3 years	Alaska Aces

=== Trades ===
==== Pre-season ====
February
February 2, 2021	To San Miguel CJ Perez	To Terrafirma Gelo Alolino; Russel Escoto; Matt Ganuelas-Rosser; 2020 San Miguel first-round pick (No. 8); 2022 San Miguel first-round pick

==== Mid-season ====
November
November 8, 2021	To San Miguel Vic Manuel	To NorthPort Arwind Santos
November 13, 2021	To San Miguel Simon Enciso	To Terrafirma Alex Cabagnot

=== Recruited imports ===
Tournament	Name	Debuted	Last game	Record
Governors' Cup	Brandon Brown	December 8, 2021 (vs. NLEX)	December 26, 2021 (vs. Terrafirma)	3–2
Governors' Cup	Orlando Johnson	February 16, 2022 (vs. TNT)	February 23, 2022 (vs. Phoenix)	2–1
Governors' Cup	Shabazz Muhammad	February 27, 2022 (vs. Magnolia)	March 18, 2022 (vs. Meralco)	2–2
