= 2021 Meralco Bolts season =

- Head coach: Norman Black
- Owner(s): Manila Electric Company (an MVP Group subsidiary)

Philippine Cup results
- Record: 9–2 (81.8%)
- Place: 2nd
- Playoff finish: Semifinalist (lost to Magnolia, 2–4)

Governors' Cup results
- Record: 7–4 (63.6%)
- Place: 4th
- Playoff finish: Runner-up (lost to Barangay Ginebra, 2–4)

Meralco Bolts seasons

The 2021 Meralco Bolts season was the 11th season of the franchise in the Philippine Basketball Association (PBA).

== Key dates ==
- March 14: The PBA season 46 draft was held at the TV5 Media Center in Mandaluyong.

== Draft picks ==
Round	Pick	Player	Position	Place of birth	College
1	9	Alvin Pasaol	Guard/Forward	Philippines	UE
3	33	John Yasa	Center/Forward	Philippines	PCU
4	43	Luis Brill	Guard	USA	Wheeling

== Roster ==
2021 Meralco Bolts roster
Players
Coaches

Pos.	#	POB	Name	Height	Weight	DOB (YYYY–MM–DD)	From
G	1	(Philippines)	Aaron Black	6 ft 1 in (1.85 m)	180 lb (82 kg)	1996–12–03	Ateneo
G	5	(United States)	Chris Banchero	6 ft 1 in (1.85 m)	175 lb (79 kg)	1989–01–24	Seattle Pacific
F	6	(Philippines)	Raymar Jose	6 ft 4 in (1.93 m)	210 lb (95 kg)	1992–08–06	Far Eastern
F	7	(United States)	Cliff Hodge (C)	6 ft 4 in (1.93 m)	195 lb (88 kg)	1988–02–03	Reedley
G/F	11	(United States)	Chris Newsome	6 ft 2 in (1.88 m)	190 lb (86 kg)	1990–07–25	Ateneo
F	12	(Philippines)	Mac Belo	6 ft 4 in (1.93 m)	185 lb (84 kg)	1993–02–12	Far Eastern
F	14	(Philippines)	Michael Cañete	6 ft 4 in (1.93 m)		1993–08–14	Arellano
G	15	(United States)	Franky Johnson	6 ft 2 in (1.88 m)	185 lb (84 kg)	1993–08–15	Warner Pacific
G	17	(Philippines)	Anjo Caram	5 ft 7 in (1.70 m)	159 lb (72 kg)	1991–01–14	San Beda
F	19	(Philippines)	Bong Quinto	6 ft 2 in (1.88 m)		1994–12–15	Letran
C	20	(Philippines)	Raymond Almazan	6 ft 8 in (2.03 m)	194 lb (88 kg)	1989–08–02	Letran
F	21	(Philippines)	Reynel Hugnatan	6 ft 4 in (1.93 m)	210 lb (95 kg)	1978–11–03	Manila
F	22	(Philippines)	Allein Maliksi	6 ft 4 in (1.93 m)	180 lb (82 kg)	1987–09–18	UST
F	23	(Philippines)	Alvin Pasaol	6 ft 2 in (1.88 m)	200 lb (91 kg)	1995–05–06	UE
F/C	50	(Philippines)	Nonoy Baclao	6 ft 5 in (1.96 m)	190 lb (86 kg)	1987–06–15	Ateneo
F	81	(Philippines)	Jammer Jamito	6 ft 5 in (1.96 m)	190 lb (86 kg)	1990–09–01	St. Clare

Head coach

- (United States) Norman Black

Assistant coach(es)

- (Philippines) Ronnie Magsanoc (1st assistant)
- (Philippines) Luigi Trillo
- (Philippines) Gene Afable
- (Philippines) Patrick Fran
- (Philippines) Charles Tiu

Team manager

- (Philippines) Paolo Trillo

Legend

- (C) Team captain
- (CI) Commissioner's Cup Import
- (GI) Governors' Cup Import
- (EI) EASL Import
- (DP) Unsigned draft pick
- (FA) Free agent
- (IN) Inactive
- (S) Suspended
- (R) Rookie
- Injured

Roster

== Philippine Cup ==
=== Eliminations ===
==== Standings ====
Pos	Team	W	L	PCT	GB	Qualification
1	TNT Tropang Giga	10	1	.909	—	Twice-to-beat in the quarterfinals
2	Meralco Bolts	9	2	.818	1	Twice-to-beat in the quarterfinals
3	Magnolia Pambansang Manok Hotshots	8	3	.727	2	Best-of-three quarterfinals
4	San Miguel Beermen	7	4	.636	3	Best-of-three quarterfinals
5	NorthPort Batang Pier	6	5	.545 (Note: Head-to-head record: NorthPort 1–0 Rain or Shine)	4	Best-of-three quarterfinals
6	Rain or Shine Elasto Painters	6	5	.545	4	Best-of-three quarterfinals
7	NLEX Road Warriors	5	6	.455	5	Twice-to-win in the quarterfinals
8	Barangay Ginebra San Miguel	4	7	.364 (Note: Head-to-head quotient: Phoenix 1.03, Barangay Ginebra 1.01, Terrafirma 0.96; eighth seed playoff: Barangay Ginebra 95–85 Phoenix)	6	Twice-to-win in the quarterfinals
9	Phoenix Super LPG Fuel Masters	4	7	.364	6	
10	Terrafirma Dyip	4	7	.364	6	
11	Alaska Aces	3	8	.273	7	
12	Blackwater Bossing	0	11	.000	10	

Source: PBA.ph
Rules for classification: 1) winning percentage; 2) if two teams are tied, head-to-head record; if three or more teams are tied, head-to-head goal average (quotient), if tied for 8th, one-game playoff; 3) overall quotient 4) coin toss

==== Game log ====
2021 PBA Philippine Cup game log
Total: 9–2
July: 4–1

Game	Date	Opponent	Score	High points	High rebounds	High assists	Location Attendance	Record
1	July 16	NorthPort	W 85–63	Mac Belo (27)	Mac Belo (9)	Almazan, Quinto (5)	Ynares Sports Arena	1–0
2	July 18	San Miguel	W 93–87	Chris Newsome (17)	Bong Quinto (7)	Newsome, Quinto (6)	Ynares Sports Arena	2–0
3	July 24	Rain or Shine	L 72–85	Chris Newsome (13)	Cliff Hodge (12)	Chris Newsome (6)	Ynares Sports Arena	2–1
4	July 28	Phoenix Super LPG	W 91–80	Allein Maliksi (24)	Belo, Hodge, Maliksi (7)	Chris Newsome (7)	Ynares Sports Arena	3–1
5	July 31	Alaska	W 89–80	John Pinto (16)	Chris Newsome (11)	Chris Newsome (6)	Ynares Sports Arena	4–1

September: 5–1

Game	Date	Opponent	Score	High points	High rebounds	High assists	Location Attendance	Record
6	September 1	Magnolia	W 95–94	Mac Belo (22)	Cliff Hodge (11)	Chris Newsome (4)	DHVSU Gym	5–1
7	September 3	TNT	L 76–91	John Pinto (16)	Reynel Hugnatan (11)	Bong Quinto (5)	DHVSU Gym	5–2
8	September 1	Terrafirma	W 95–83	Bong Quinto (17)	Almazan, Pasaol, Quinto (8)	John Pinto (7)	DHVSU Gym	6–2
9	September 18	Blackwater	W 104–97	Allein Maliksi (21)	Raymond Almazan (17)	Bong Quinto (6)	DHVSU Gym	7–2
10	September 22	NLEX	W 104–101	Allein Maliksi (22)	Raymond Almazan (11)	Bong Quinto (8)	DHVSU Gym	8–2
11	September 23	Barangay Ginebra	W 79–66	Belo, Pasaol (15)	Raymond Almazan (10)	Bong Quinto (8)	DHVSU Gym	9–2

=== Playoffs ===
==== Bracket ====
Quarterfinals
(#1 twice-to-beat)
1	TNT	84
8	Barangay Ginebra	71
(Best-of-3)
4	San Miguel	2
5	NorthPort	0
(#2 twice-to-beat)
2	Meralco	80	97
7	NLEX	81	86
(Best-of-3)
3	Magnolia	2
6	Rain or Shine	0

Semifinals (Best-of-7)
1	TNT	4
4	San Miguel	3
2	Meralco	2
3	Magnolia	4

Finals (Best-of-7)
1	TNT	4
3	Magnolia	1

==== Game log ====
2021 PBA Philippine Cup playoffs game log
Total: 3–5
Quarterfinals: 1–1

Game	Date	Opponent	Score	High points	High rebounds	High assists	Location Attendance	Series
1	September 29	NLEX	L 80–81	Allein Maliksi (16)	Cliff Hodge (11)	Newsome, Quinto (4)	DHVSU Gym	0–1
2	October 1	NLEX	W 97–86	Chris Newsome (23)	Hodge, Newsome (9)	Caram, Newsome (6)	DHVSU Gym	1–1

Semifinals: 2–4

Game	Date	Opponent	Score	High points	High rebounds	High assists	Location Attendance	Series
1	October 3	Magnolia	L 79–88	Bong Quinto (14)	Cliff Hodge (8)	Bong Quinto (10)	DHVSU Gym	0–1
2	October 6	Magnolia	L 78–92	Chris Newsome (18)	Belo, Hugnatan (7)	Chris Newsome (7)	DHVSU Gym	0–2
3	October 8	Magnolia	W 91–86	Chris Newsome (17)	Cliff Hodge (12)	Newsome, Quinto (4)	DHVSU Gym	1–2
4	October 10	Magnolia	L 69–81	Reynel Hugnatan (21)	Reynel Hugnatan (9)	Chris Newsome (8)	DHVSU Gym	1–3
5	October 13	Magnolia	W 102–98	Allein Maliksi (29)	Raymond Almazan (10)	Chris Newsome (6)	DHVSU Gym	2–3
6	October 15	Magnolia	L 85–93	Raymond Almazan (16)	Raymond Almazan (12)	Hodge, Newsome (6)	DHVSU Gym	2–4

== Governors' Cup ==
=== Eliminations ===
==== Standings ====
Pos	Team	W	L	PCT	GB	Qualification
1	Magnolia Pambansang Manok Hotshots	9	2	.818	—	Twice-to-beat in quarterfinals
2	NLEX Road Warriors	8	3	.727	1	Twice-to-beat in quarterfinals
3	TNT Tropang Giga	7	4	.636 (Note: Head-to-head quotient: TNT 1.07, Meralco 0.99, San Miguel 0.95)	2	Twice-to-beat in quarterfinals
4	Meralco Bolts	7	4	.636	2	Twice-to-beat in quarterfinals
5	San Miguel Beermen	7	4	.636	2	Twice-to-win in quarterfinals
6	Barangay Ginebra San Miguel	6	5	.545 (Note: Head-to-head record: Barangay Ginebra 1–0 Alaska)	3	Twice-to-win in quarterfinals
7	Alaska Aces	6	5	.545	3	Twice-to-win in quarterfinals
8	Phoenix Super LPG Fuel Masters	5	6	.455 (Note: Eighth seed playoff: Phoenix 101–98 NorthPort)	4	Twice-to-win in quarterfinals
9	NorthPort Batang Pier	5	6	.455	4	
10	Rain or Shine Elasto Painters	3	8	.273	6	
11	Terrafirma Dyip	2	9	.182	7	
12	Blackwater Bossing	1	10	.091	8	

Source: PBA.ph
Rules for classification: 1) winning percentage; 2) if two teams are tied, head-to-head record; if three or more teams are tied, head-to-head goal average (quotient), if tied for 8th, one-game playoff; 3) overall quotient 4) coin toss

==== Game log ====
2021 PBA Governors' Cup game log
Total: 7–4
December: 2–0

Game	Date	Opponent	Score	High points	High rebounds	High assists	Location Attendance	Record
1	December 16	Blackwater	W 98–77	Tony Bishop (28)	Tony Bishop (13)	John Pinto (7)	Smart Araneta Coliseum	1–0
2	December 22	TNT	W 83–80	Tony Bishop (36)	Tony Bishop (17)	Newsome, Pinto (4)	Smart Araneta Coliseum	2–0

February: 4–2

Game	Date	Opponent	Score	High points	High rebounds	High assists	Location Attendance	Record
3	February 11, 2022	NLEX	W 110–100	Tony Bishop (32)	Tony Bishop (13)	Tony Bishop (8)	Smart Araneta Coliseum	3–0
4	February 13, 2022	Barangay Ginebra	W 101–95	Tony Bishop (30)	Tony Bishop (13)	Bishop, Newsome (7)	Smart Araneta Coliseum	4–0
5	February 17, 2022	NorthPort	L 98–109	Tony Bishop (34)	Tony Bishop (16)	Chris Newsome (8)	Smart Araneta Coliseum	4–1
6	February 20, 2022	Rain or Shine	W 93–88	Tony Bishop (26)	Tony Bishop (14)	Chris Banchero (5)	Smart Araneta Coliseum; 3,347	5–1
7	February 24, 2022	Terrafirma	W 107–95	Tony Bishop (26)	Tony Bishop (11)	Allein Maliksi (6)	Ynares Center	6–1
8	February 26, 2022	Alaska	L 93–94	Allein Maliksi (32)	Tony Bishop (13)	Tony Bishop (5)	Ynares Center	6–2

March: 1–2

Game	Date	Opponent	Score	High points	High rebounds	High assists	Location Attendance	Record
9	March 2, 2022	Magnolia	L 85–88	Tony Bishop (19)	Tony Bishop (14)	Chris Newsome (5)	Smart Araneta Coliseum	6–3
10	March 5, 2022	San Miguel	L 110–115	Tony Bishop (29)	Tony Bishop (14)	Chris Newsome (7)	Smart Araneta Coliseum	6–4
11	March 11, 2022	Phoenix Super LPG	W 109–90	Tony Bishop (35)	Tony Bishop (13)	Tony Bishop (5)	Smart Araneta Coliseum	7–4

=== Playoffs ===
==== Bracket ====
Quarterfinals (Top 4 twice-to-beat)
1	Magnolia	127
8	Phoenix Super LPG	88
4	Meralco	100
5	San Miguel	85
2	NLEX	79	96
7	Alaska	93	80
3	TNT	92	95
6	Barangay Ginebra	104	115

Semifinals (Best-of-5)
1	Magnolia	2
4	Meralco	3
2	NLEX	1
6	Barangay Ginebra	3

Finals (Best-of-7)
4	Meralco	2
6	Barangay Ginebra	4

==== Game log ====
2021 PBA Governors' game log
Total: 6–6
Quarterfinals: 1–0

Game	Date	Opponent	Score	High points	High rebounds	High assists	Location Attendance	Series
1	March 18, 2022	San Miguel	W 100–85	Tony Bishop (32)	Tony Bishop (16)	Bong Quinto (5)	Smart Araneta Coliseum	1–0

Semifinals: 3–2

Game	Date	Opponent	Score	High points	High rebounds	High assists	Location Attendance	Series
1	March 23, 2022	Magnolia	L 80–94	Chris Banchero (16)	Tony Bishop (12)	Bong Quinto (4)	SM Mall of Asia Arena	0–1
2	March 25, 2022	Magnolia	W 81–75	Tony Bishop (22)	Tony Bishop (14)	Aaron Black (4)	SM Mall of Asia Arena	1–1
3	March 27, 2022	Magnolia	W 101–95	Tony Bishop (27)	Tony Bishop (10)	Banchero, Newsome (5)	SM Mall of Asia Arena; 13,272	2–1
4	March 30, 2022	Magnolia	L 73–94	Tony Bishop (22)	Tony Bishop (16)	Chris Newsome (5)	Smart Araneta Coliseum; 10,353	2–2
5	April 1, 2022	Magnolia	W 94–81	Allein Maliksi (24)	Bishop, Newsome (8)	Chris Newsome (12)	Smart Araneta Coliseum	3–2

Finals: 2–4

Game	Date	Opponent	Score	High points	High rebounds	High assists	Location Attendance	Series
1	April 6, 2022	Barangay Ginebra	W 104–91	Allein Maliksi (22)	Tony Bishop (12)	Chris Newsome (7)	Smart Araneta Coliseum; 12,457	1–0
2	April 8, 2022	Barangay Ginebra	L 93–99	Tony Bishop (31)	Tony Bishop (13)	Aaron Black (6)	SM Mall of Asia Arena; 12,248	1–1
3	April 10, 2022	Barangay Ginebra	W 83–74	Tony Bishop (30)	Tony Bishop (16)	Chris Newsome (6)	SM Mall of Asia Arena; 16,104	2–1
4	April 13, 2022	Barangay Ginebra	L 84–95	Tony Bishop (25)	Almazan, Black (9)	Chris Newsome (5)	Smart Araneta Coliseum; 17,298	2–2
5	April 17, 2022	Barangay Ginebra	L 110–115	Tony Bishop (30)	Tony Bishop (15)	Black, Newsome (5)	Smart Araneta Coliseum; 18,251	2–3
6	April 22, 2022	Barangay Ginebra	L 92–103	Tony Bishop (21)	Tony Bishop (16)	Chris Newsome (6)	SM Mall of Asia Arena; 20,224	2–4

== Transactions ==
=== Trades ===
==== Pre-season ====
February
February 4, 2021	To Meralco Mac Belo	To Blackwater Baser Amer; Bryan Faundo

==== Mid-season ====
December
December 4, 2021	To Meralco Franky Johnson	To Rain or Shine Trevis Jackson

=== Recruited imports ===
Tournament	Name	Debuted	Last game	Record
Governors' Cup	Tony Bishop	December 16, 2021 (vs. Blackwater)	April 22, 2022 (vs. Barangay Ginebra)	13–10
