= Raymond Almazan =

Filipino basketball player (born 1989)

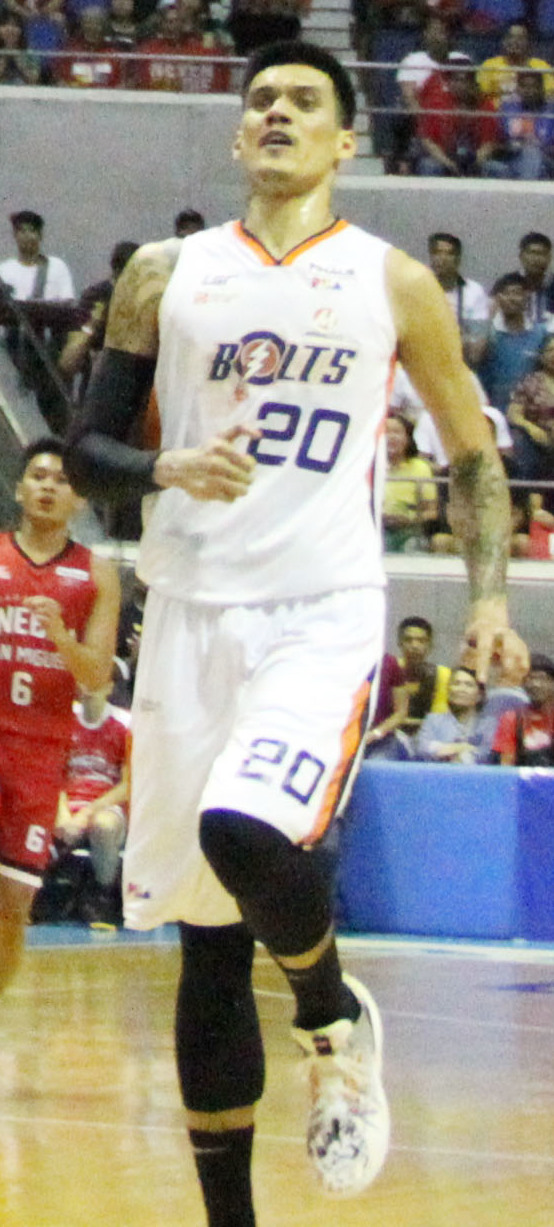
- Almazan with the Meralco Bolts in 2020

No. 20 – Meralco Bolts
- Position: Center / power forward
- League: PBA

Personal information
- Born: August 2, 1989 (age 37) Orion, Bataan, Philippines
- Listed height: 6 ft 8 in (2.03 m)
- Listed weight: 194 lb (88 kg)

Career information
- High school: Orion National (Orion, Bataan)
- College: Letran
- PBA draft: 2013: 1st round, 3rd overall pick
- Drafted by: Rain or Shine Elasto Painters
- Playing career: 2013–present

Career history
- 2013–2019: Rain or Shine Elasto Painters
- 2019–present: Meralco Bolts

Career highlights
- 2× PBA champion (2016 Commissioner's, 2024 Philippine); 3× PBA All-Star (2017, 2018, 2023); PBA Greats vs. Stalwarts Game MVP (2016); PBA 3-Point Shootout–Big Man edition champion (2024); PBA All-Rookie Team (2013); NCAA Philippines Most Valuable Player (2013); 2× NCAA Philippines Mythical Five (2011, 2013); 2× NCAA Philippines Defensive Player of the Year (2012, 2013); NCAA Philippines Most Improved Player (2011)

Raymond Canaria Almazan (born August 2, 1989) is a Filipino professional basketball player for the Meralco Bolts of the Philippine Basketball Association (PBA). He is nicknamed Rock N' Roll.

== College career ==
He played for the Letran Knights in the NCAA where he established himself as a defensive player, rebounder and shot-blocker. He was both awarded as the Most Valuable Player and Defensive Player of the Year for the NCAA Season 89 and led the Knights to the men's basketball championship match against the San Beda Red Lions for two straight seasons, by which they were beaten on both occasions. He finished his college career without a championship.

While in college, he also played for the Cagayan Rising Suns and several other teams in the PBA D-League.

== Professional career ==
=== Rain or Shine ===
Almazan was drafted 3rd overall by the Rain or Shine Elasto Painters in the 2013 PBA Draft. He played alongside the celebrated Extra Rice Inc. frontline of Beau Belga and JR Quiñahan and was a key role player off-the-bench.

==== 2013–2014 ====
On December 29, 2013, he played his first breakout game as a pro, finishing with 17 points, 11 rebounds, and two blocks in just 24 minutes in the Elasto Painters’ 101–77 victory over the San Mig Super Coffee Mixers. In his first conference, Rain or Shine beat the Globalport Batang Pier in the quarterfinals, and the Petron Blaze Boosters in the semifinals. But they lost to the San Mig Coffee Mixers in six games. In Game 6, he and the entire team participated in a partial walkout in the 2nd quarter and delayed the game for 10 minutes. They were then fined P2 million for their actions. His team made the semis in the Commissioner's Cup, where they lost to the Talk N'Text Tropang Texters. In a win against the Meralco Bolts in the 2014 Governor's Cup, he had 12 points, 15 rebounds, and 4 blocks. His team made it to the finals, but lost once again to the Coffee Mixers, giving the Mixers a Grand Slam. He finished the season as a member of the All-Rookie Team.

==== 2014–2015 ====
In a game against the Blackwater Elite in the 2014–15 Philippine Cup, Almazan had 17 points and 9 rebounds. His team made it all the way to the semis against the Alaska Aces. In a Game 5 loss, he had 16 points and 9 rebounds. He ended that conference with 11 points and 8 boards as Rain or Shine lost the series in Game 6. He also took part in the 2014 Rookies vs Sophomores game in the 2015 All-Star Weekend. After a game against the Barangay Ginebra San Miguel in the Commissioner's Cup, he was fined 40,000 pesos for “taunting, provoking, and scoffing at the fans with the use of a dirty finger and other offensive verbal physical gestures.” His team clinched the first seed that conference. They beat Ginebra in the quarterfinals, with Almazan providing 17 points (12 in the fourth), 5 rebounds and the triple that tied the game 84-all. They also swept Meralco in the semis. In Game 6 of the finals against TNT, he had 18 points (11 in the first) on 8-of-10 shooting, and 10 boards as Rain or Sine won. But in Game 7, they lost in double overtime, 121–119, and the Tropang Texters won the championship. In the Governor's Cup, his team started 1–4, but finished the elimination round on a 6-game win streak, good for the 3rd seed. They made it all the way to the semis, where the San Miguel Beermen eliminated them in four games in a best-of-five format.

==== 2015–2016 ====
In the 2015–16 Philippine Cup, he posted career-highs of 21 points and 17 rebounds in a win over Meralco. They made it to the semis against the Beermen, where before Game 3, he stepped on Jewel Ponferada's foot, spraining his right ankle. Without him, Rain or Shine lost in 6 games. In the 2016 Commissioner's Cup, he won his first championship, as his team won the finals in 6 games. He was on the Stalwarts team that won vs the Greats during the PBA All-Star Weekend that year. Unfortunately, Rain or Shine couldn't keep that momentum going in the Governor's Cup, as they failed to make at least the quarterfinals.

==== 2016–2017 ====
In the offseason, Almazan secured a contract extension. He had 14 points and 16 rebounds in a win against Blackwater in the Philippine Cup. He missed games in January and February due to a calf injury. His team made the playoffs as the 8th seed, but lost to the Beermen in the first round. In his first game back during the Commissioner's Cup, he had 18 points off the bench. He played in the 2017 All-Star games as a member of Gilas Pilipinas. He also missed some games in May due to his commitments to Gilas. Rain or Shine was swept by the Star Hotshots in the first round, failing to defend their Commissioner's Cup title. In the Governor's Cup, he hit clutch free throws along with his 15 points and 10 rebounds off the bench against Globalport to secure the win, 98–96. He had to miss some games due to the FIBA Asia Cup. In his first game after his Gilas duties, he had 13 points, 14 rebounds, and 3 assists as Rain or Shine won against the Hotshots, 92–88. After that game, he had to be taken to the hospital due to dehydration. He had 25 points, 11 rebounds, and 2 blocks against the Phoenix Fuel Masters. They finished the eliminations with 7 wins in 11 games., and were knocked out of title contention by the TNT Katropa.

==== 2017–2018 ====
During the Philippine Cup, Almazan was benched against Phoenix for a subpar showing in their previous game against Globalport. He got into an elbow match against Eric Camson of the Kia Picanto, and was ejected from the game. He was then fined P20K and suspended for one game. He bounced back with 23 points on 9-of-11 shooting against the Magnolia Hotshots. They made the playoffs, but he injured his hands in their last game of the eliminations. They were swept by Ginebra in the quarterfinals. In the Commissioner's Cup, he tied his career-high of 25 points and also had 14 rebounds all off the bench. In a game against Globalport, he hit import Malcolm White in the face, and then shouted at him in the dugouts after the game. He played for the Luzon All-Stars during All-Star Week. Rain or Shine made it all the way to the semis, being eliminated by Ginebra. In the Governor's Cup, he was absent in most of their games for unknown reasons. His team did not make the playoffs.

==== 2019 ====
Almazan missed Rain or Shine's debut in the 2019 Philippine Cup with a right ankle sprain. He returned in a game against Blackwater. After that conference, he was traded to Meralco.

=== Meralco Bolts (2019–present) ===
The Meralco Bolts traded for Almazan with their 2019 and 2021 first-round draft picks. He had a quiet debut of three points, one rebound, one assist, and one steal in the Commissioner's Cup. However, they did not make the playoffs that conference. In the Governor's Cup, he played better, starting with 19 points and 13 rebounds against Magnolia. He had 17 points and 17 rebounds, but didn't get the win against NLEX because he got called for goaltending with 37.3 seconds remaining. He was just two points shy of a 20–20 outing as he produced 18 markers and a career-high 24 boards against the Columbian Dyip. He finished with 18 points and 19 rebounds as Meralco finished with an 8–3 record. His team beat Alaska in the quarterfinals, and TNT in five semifinal games. In the finals, they went up against Ginebra. In Game 1, he had 20 points and 13 rebounds, but Ginebra took the win. They won Game 2 and he had 15 points and 9 rebounds. In Game 3, he got hurt after landing on LA Tenorio as he went for a drive. He was ruled out of the match and Meralco lost. The injury was later revealed to be a meniscal tear in his left knee. He attempted to play in Game 4, but didn't play in Game 5 as Ginebra won the championship.

Almazan was able to recover during the lockdowns. He was able to play in the 2020 Philippine Cup. He returned to action in a win against the Aces. They finished the season 7–4. He injured his left knee again in the quarterfinals, but his team moved on to the semis. In Game Four of that series, he had the game-saving block on Stanley Pringle. They lost Game 5, with Scottie Thompson's three pointer preventing Meralco from advancing to the finals.

In the 2021 Philippine Cup, he had a conference-high 17 rebounds to go with his 15 points as Meralco gave the Elite their 19th consecutive defeat. They ended the elimination round at 9–2. In Game 2 of their quarterfinals series against the Hotshots, he exited the game with a sprained ankle. He returned in Game 5, but they were eliminated the next game.

On March 23, 2024, Almazan won the PBA All-Star Big Man 3-point shooting at La Salle Coliseum. With 7-year-old son Rayl Jacob, he received a P30,000 cash prize from Willie Marcial and chairman Ricky Vargas.

== PBA career statistics ==
Legend
GP	Games played	MPG	Minutes per game	FG%	Field-goal percentage
3FG%	3-point field-goal percentage	4P%	4-point field-goal percentage	FT%	Free-throw percentage
RPG	Rebounds per game	APG	Assists per game	SPG	Steals per game
BPG	Blocks per game	PPG	Points per game	127	Career high

As of the end of 2025–26 season

=== Season-by-season averages ===
Year	Team	GP	MPG	FG%	3P%	4P%	FT%	RPG	APG	SPG	BPG	PPG
2013–14	Rain or Shine	60	15.3	.556	.176	—	.578	5.6	.6	.3	1.0	5.9
2014–15	Rain or Shine	55	18.9	.557	.167	—	.642	5.6	.6	.3	.7	7.6
2015–16	Rain or Shine	50	16.3	.504	.241	—	.724	6.0	.7	.2	.8	7.4
2016–17	Rain or Shine	27	19.5	.564	.341	—	.608	6.9	.8	.1	.9	10.1
2017–18	Rain or Shine	30	21.8	.464	.308	—	.646	7.2	1.1	.4	1.2	11.4
2019	Rain or Shine	35	26.0	.456	.228	—	.645	8.0	.9	.3	1.3	9.9
2019	Meralco	35	26.0	.456	.228	—	.645	8.0	.9	.3	1.3	9.9
2020	Meralco	17	19.4	.528	.222	—	.500	6.2	.9	.5	.9	8.2
2021	Meralco	40	20.5	.562	.118	—	.679	6.0	.9	.4	1.3	7.7
2022–23	Meralco	45	21.7	.469	.423	—	.711	6.7	.8	.2	.9	8.2
2023–24	Meralco	36	19.2	.452	.429	—	.722	6.3	.6	.2	.5	7.0
2024–25	Meralco	30	14.3	.531	.286	—	.673	5.1	.4	.1	.9	6.4
2025–26	Meralco	28	14.8	.598	.273	—	.750	3.9	.6	.2	.8	6.3
Career		453	18.8	.512	.281	—	.655	6.1	.7	.3	.9	7.8

== National team career ==
Almazan was first invited to the Philippines' national team for the 2016 FIBA Olympic Qualifying Tournament, but he was not released by Rain or Shine. He first played for Gilas in the 2017 SEABA Championship. He was also a member of the Gilas team in the SEA Games that year, and the FIBA Asia Cup.

In 2018, he was included in the roster for the 2018 Asian Games, along with most of his Rain or Shine teammates. He was also in the roster for the 4th window of the Asian Qualifiers for the 2019 FIBA Basketball World Cup.

In 2019, he played for Gilas in the 2019 FIBA Basketball World Cup.

In 2022, he was in the pool for the fourth window of the 2023 FIBA World Cup Asian Qualifiers, but had to beg off due to family issues regarding his son's health.

== Personal life ==
Almazan is the father of 7-year-old son Rayl Jacob.

On April 15, 2024, Almazan was accused of attempted bribery of Jayson Montemayo, a Philippine Coast Guard officer who issued a traffic ticket after the Special Action and Intelligence Committee for Transportation (DOTr-SAICT) traffic police flagged him down for using the EDSA Busway in an unauthorized SUV-Disregarding Traffic Sign-driving without the certificate of registration and vehicle official receipt.
