= Shawn Glover =

American basketball player

Free agent
- Position: Power forward / small forward

Personal information
- Born: September 25, 1990 (age 36) Dallas, Texas, U.S.
- Listed height: 6 ft 7 in (2.01 m)
- Listed weight: 215 lb (98 kg)

Career information
- High school: Cedar Hill (Cedar Hill, Texas)
- College: Utah (2009–2011); Oral Roberts (2012–2014)
- NBA draft: 2014: undrafted
- Playing career: 2014–present

Career history
- 2014–2015: Palma Air Europa
- 2015: TLI-Alba Fehérvár
- 2015–2016: Bakken Bears
- 2016: Ironi Kiryat Ata
- 2017–2018: Welcome
- 2018–2019: Club Malvín
- 2020–2021: Tindastóll
- 2021: KR
- 2022–2023: Blackwater Bossing
- 2023: Las Ánimas de Valdivia

Career highlights
- Danish Cup winner (2016); Danish Cup MVP (2016); Úrvalsdeild scoring leader (2021); First-team All-Southland (2014); Second-team All-Southland (2013); Southland All-Defensive Team (2014)

Shawn Glover (born September 25, 1990) is an American professional basketball player. He competed with the Oral Roberts Golden Eagles men's basketball team in his final years of college, initially playing for the Utah Utes men's basketball program. Glover was named First Team All-Southland in 2014 after being one of the top scorers in the NCAA and making school history.

== High school career ==
Glover, attending Cedar Hill High School in Cedar Hill, Texas, was named the Longhorns' team MVP twice. Under head coach David Milson, he was named all-district, all-regional, and ultimately all-state. Averaging 15 points, 4 rebounds, and 3 assists in his senior year at Cedar Hill, Glover's third season as the team's captain, he eventually graduated with a grade-point average above 3.0. The peak of Glover's high school basketball career is considered to be in the 2009 UIL state tournament, in which he averaged 16.5 points, 10.0 rebounds, and 4.0 blocks. He led his team to the 5A title game, where he shot 6-for-11 in a loss to DeSoto High School.

== College career ==
After receiving offers from various schools around the nation, the most notable being Oklahoma State, Marquette, and Colorado, Shawn Glover committed to Utah on September 11, 2008. He was then listed as a power forward with outstanding handles and developing strength by Rivals.com.

In his freshman year with the Utah Utes, Shawn Glover made 13 starts in the 29 games he played in. He scored a season-high 10 points against Wyoming on February 27, 2010. He recorded seven rebounds at UNLV, which soon became a season-high as well. By the end of the season, Glover had been averaging 3.4 points, 2.0 rebounds, and 0.5 assists, ranking 7th on the team scoring-wise. Also made a game winning buzzer beater against top 25 Illinois University fighting Illini.

As a sophomore, Glover saw the three top scorers on the freshman team leave, On February 5, 2011, in a loss to Air Force, Glover recorded a season-high 15 points despite the fact that he was not a starter.

Shortly after his second year at Utah, Shawn Glover sought permission to transfer following a coaching change to the Ute Program, to a school outside of the Pac-12 Conference. He ended up with Oral Roberts, whom he had previously declined an offer from.

Throughout his first year at Oral Roberts, Glover strengthened a frontcourt that had previously been single-handedly led by top scorer Warren Niles. By the end of the season, the transfer became the team's third leading scorer, behind Niles and Damen Bell-Holter.

As both leading scorers on the 2012–13 Oral Roberts team left in an attempt to play professionally, a breakout season for Shawn Glover ensued. He finished the regular season averaging 21.3 points, helping him be the eighth member of the school's 1,000-point club (fastest all-time). He was named First Team All-Southland and was also known to be one of the conference's most elite defenders. Although Glover was tied for being the 11th highest scorer in the 2013-14 NCAA Division I men's basketball season, the prestigious Southland Conference Men's Basketball Player of the Year award went to Stephen F. Austin's Jacob Parker.

== Professional career ==
On August 16, 2014, Glover signed a deal to play with Palma Air Europa for the 2014–15 season.

For the 2015–16 season, Glover initially signed with Alba Fehérvár of the Hungarian Hungarian National Championship. He left the team in December 2015, as he was announced by Bakken Bears of the Danish Basketligaen. In January 2016, he won the Danish Basketball Cup with the Bears and he was named the Danish Cup MVP after a 24 points performance in the Final.

In July 2020, Glover signed with Tindastóll of the Icelandic Úrvalsdeild karla. He left the team in March 2021 after falling out with head coach Baldur Þór Ragnarsson. In 11 games for Tindastóll, Glover averaged a team leading 26.2 points and 7.4 rebounds.

In September 2021, Glover signed with Úrvalsdeild club KR. In his Úrvalsdeild debut for KR, he scored a season high 40 points in an overtime win against Breiðablik. On November 12, 2021, he scored 33 points and recorded 15 rebounds in a 98–90 win over Stjarnan. In 10 games, he averaged 21.8 points and 7.9 rebounds in the Úrvalsdeild.

In December 2021, Glover joined the Blackwater Bossing for the 2021 PBA Governors' Cup as a replacement for the injured Jaylen Bond. In December 2022, he returned with the team as their import for the 2023 PBA Governors' Cup.
