= Bong Quinto =

Filipino basketball player

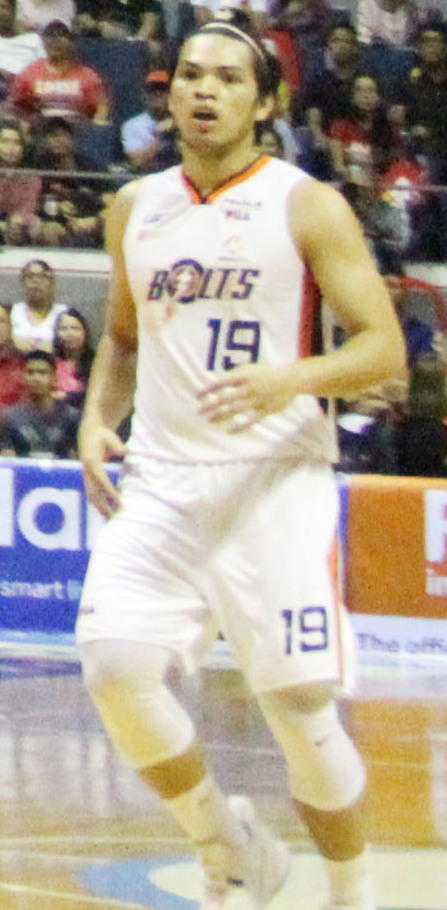
- Quinto with the Meralco Bolts in 2020

No. 19 – Meralco Bolts
- Position: Small forward
- League: PBA

Personal information
- Born: December 15, 1994 (age 31) Quezon City, Philippines
- Listed height: 6 ft 2 in (1.88 m)

Career information
- High school: Letran (Manila)
- College: Letran
- PBA draft: 2018: 2nd round, 14th overall pick
- Drafted by: Meralco Bolts
- Playing career: 2018–present

Career history
- 2018: Batangas City Athletics
- 2019–present: Meralco Bolts

Career highlights
- PBA champion (2024 Philippine); PBA Mr. Quality Minutes (2024); MPBL champion (2018); NCAA Philippines Champion (2015); NCAA Philippines Mythical Team (2018)

Kier John "Bong" R. Quinto (born December 15, 1994) is a Filipino professional basketball player for the Meralco Bolts of the Philippine Basketball Association (PBA).

== College and amateur career ==
Quinto played his college career with the Letran Knights, where we won a championship in 2015 during NCAA Season 91. He was also selected to Mythical Team in 2018 during NCAA Season 94.

In between Season 93 and 94, Quinto was part of the Batangas City Athletics team that won the Maharlika Pilipinas Basketball League's inaugural championship in 2018.

== Professional career ==
In the 2018 PBA draft, Quinto was selected by the Meralco Bolts with the 14th overall pick and signed with the team on January 3, 2019. He became a role player for the Meralco, helping the team claim their first PBA championship in the 2024 PBA Philippine Cup finals.

== Personal life ==
Bong Quinto is the son of Danilo R. Quinto (b. August 1, 1958), who died in 2021. On January 3, 2021, Quinto got engaged to his longtime girlfriend of eight years and eight months, Joyce Pestaño.

In May 2021, Quinto earned his college degree in marketing management at Letran under the Class of 2020 after multiple delays brought by the COVID-19 pandemic.

== Career statistics ==
=== PBA ===
Legend
GP	Games played	MPG	Minutes per game	FG%	Field-goal percentage
3FG%	3-point field-goal percentage	4P%	4-point field-goal percentage	FT%	Free-throw percentage
RPG	Rebounds per game	APG	Assists per game	SPG	Steals per game
BPG	Blocks per game	PPG	Points per game	**127**	Career high

As of the end of 2025–26 season

==== Season-by-season averages ====
Year	Team	GP	MPG	FG%	3P%	4P%	FT%	RPG	APG	SPG	BPG	PPG
2019	Meralco	43	19.6	.430	.403	—	.574	2.5	1.5	.5	.0	5.2
2020	Meralco	18	26.8	.399	.275	—	.655	**4.6**	2.7	.5	**.2**	8.4
2021	Meralco	42	23.5	.366	.225	—	.775	3.4	3.1	.5	.1	6.8
2022–23	Meralco	**49**	25.1	**.448**	.347	—	**.835**	3.4	2.4	**.7**	.0	9.4
2023–24	Meralco	39	25.9	.426	.383	—	.744	3.4	2.5	.5	.1	10.1
2024–25	Meralco	40	**29.5**	.405	**.417**	**.300**	.748	4.1	**3.4**	.6	.0	**12.3**
2025–26	Meralco	47	25.8	.409	.302	.290	.680	4.2	2.4	**.7**	.0	9.1
Career		278	25.0	.413	.345	.295	.730	3.6	2.5	.6	.1	8.8

=== MPBL ===
Legend
GP	Games played	MPG	Minutes per game
FG%	Field-goal percentage	3P%	3-point field-goal percentage	FT%	Free-throw percentage
RPG	Rebounds per game	APG	Assists per game	SPG	Steals per game
BPG	Blocks per game	PPG	Points per game	**Bold**	Career high

As of the end of 2018–19 season

==== Season-by-season averages ====
Year	Team	GP	GS	MPG	FG%	3P%	FT%	RPG	APG	SPG	BPG	PPG
2018	Batangas City	**16**	**1**	19.3	**.467**	**.350**	**.714**	**4.7**	2.3	**1.1**	**.1**	**10.0**
2018–19	Batangas City	5	0	**22.8**	.389	.250	.652	3.8	**2.6**	.6	—	8.8
