= Jaylen Bond =

American basketball player (born 1993)

East Carolina Pirates
- Title: Assistant Coach
- League: The American

Personal information
- Born: April 11, 1993 (age 33) Norristown, Pennsylvania, U.S.
- Listed height: 6 ft 8 in (2.03 m)
- Listed weight: 240 lb (109 kg)

Career information
- High school: Plymouth-Whitemarsh (Plymouth Meeting, Pennsylvania)
- College: Texas (2011–2013); Temple (2014–2016)
- NBA draft: 2016: undrafted
- Playing career: 2016–2021
- Position: Power forward
- Coaching career: 2022–present

Career history

Playing
- 2016–2017: Westchester Knicks
- 2017–2018: Pistoia Basket 2000
- 2018–2020: Al Nasr
- 2020–2021: Al-Muharraq
- 2021: Blackwater Bossing

Coaching
- 2022–2024: Temple (GA)
- 2024–2025: Albany (assistant)
- 2025-present: East Carolina (assistant)

Jaylen Bond (born April 11, 1993) is an American basketball coach and former player player who is currently an assistant coach at East Carolina University. He played college basketball for Texas and Temple.

== High school career ==
Bond attended Plymouth-Whitemarsh High School. He was named Associated Press Class AAAA player of the year as a senior. He averaged 19.0 points and 11.2 rebounds per game and led the team to a 25–6 record and the Pennsylvania Class 4A state semifinals. In his career, he scored 1,608 points.

== College career ==
=== Texas (2011-2013) ===
Bond averaged 3.4 points and 4.6 rebounds per game as a freshman at Texas. His scoring and rebounding dropped to 2.8 points and 3.2 rebounds per game as a sophomore as he battled ankle and foot injuries.

=== Temple (2014-2016) ===
Bond transferred from Texas to Temple in May 2013. He had two points and five rebounds in his first game as an Owl, a loss to Duke on November 21, 2014. Bond posted 7.6 points, 7.9 rebounds and 1.4 steals per game as a junior.

He was named to the American Athletic Conference all-tournament team as a senior after posting 17 points and 10 rebounds in the semifinal loss to UConn. Bond tallied 11 double-doubles as a senior. He contributed 14 points and 15 rebounds in his final game, a 72–70 overtime loss to Iowa in the NCAA Tournament. As a senior at Temple, Bond averaged 10.3 points and 8.5 rebounds per game.

== Professional career ==
After graduation, Bond joined the Westchester Knicks of the NBA D-League. In his rookie season, he averaged 7.5 points, 6.3 rebounds and 1.3 assists per game.

In September 2017, he signed a one-year contract with the Italian team Pistoia Basket 2000. He averaged 6.6 points and 6.6 rebounds per game. In 2018, Bond signed with Al Nasr in the United Arab Emirates, helping the team win the regular season. He re-signed with the team in 2019.

On August 1, 2020, Bond signed with Al-Muharraq in Bahrain.

In November 2021, Bond signed with Blackwater Bossing of the Philippine Basketball Association.

== Coaching career ==
After the conclusion of his playing career, Bond returned to Temple as a graduate assistant in 2022. Bond then served as an assistant coach at Albany and East Carolina.
