= Pampanga State University =

Public university in Pampanga, Philippines

- Pambansang Pamantasan ng Pampanga (Filipino)
- Escuela de Artes y Oficios de Bacolor
- Former names: List: Don Honorio Ventura State University; Don Honorio Ventura Technological State University; Don Honorio Ventura College of Arts and Trades; Don Honorio Ventura Memorial School of Arts and Trades; Pampanga School of Arts and Trades; Bacolor Trade School; Escuela de Artes y Oficios de Bacolor
- Motto: Education Beyond Borders
- Hymn: Pampanga State University Hymn
- Type: State University
- Established: November 4, 1861 (165 years and 12 days)
- Founder: Fr. Juan P. Zita
- Academic affiliations: PASUC, AACCUP, CAASUC
- Chairman: Dr. Michelle Aguilar-Ong (Commissioner, Commission on Higher Education)
- President: Enrique G. Baking, Ed.D.
- Vice-president: Reden M. Hernandez, RCE, MM (Executive VP, concurrent VP for Academic Affairs, and VP for Administration and Finance); Ranie B. Canlas, DIT (VP for Research, Innovation, Training, and Extension); Dolores T. Quiambao, Ed.D. (VP for Student Affairs and Services)
- Principal: Jerame N. Gamboa, Ed.D., Ph.D. (Laboratory High School)
- Dean: Atty. Jord Jharoah B. Valenton, LL.M. (School of Law); Dolores T. Quiambao, Ed.D. (Graduate School); Adonis A. David, Ph.D. (College of Arts and Sciences); Luisito B. Reyes, DBA (College of Business Studies); Joel D. Canlas, MIT, MBA (College of Computing Studies); Riza B. Lintag, Ed.D. (College of Education); Jun P. Flores, PECE, Ph.D. (College of Engineering and Architecture); Kathleen Joyce M. Coronel, LPT, MBA (College of Hospitality and Tourism Management); Nilo Q. Manuntag, PECE, MEP-ECE (OIC-College of Industrial Technology); Reynaldo S. Alipio, MD, MHA, RN, MAN (OIC-College of Nursing and Allied Health Sciences); Nelly N. Pilao, Ph.D. (College of Social Sciences and Philosophy)
- Students: 42,336 (as of 1st semester, A.Y. 2025-2026)
- Location: Barangay Cabambangan, Bacolor, Pampanga (Main Campus); 14°59′52″N 120°39′17″E
- Campus: Main Campus Bacolor Regular Campuses Apalit Candaba Lubao Mexico Porac Santo Tomas City of San Fernando Floridablanca
- Newspaper: The Industrialist
- Colors: Maroon and Gold
- Sporting affiliations: SCUAA, UCAAP, UCLAA
- Mascot: Wildcats
- Website: www.pampangastateu.edu.ph
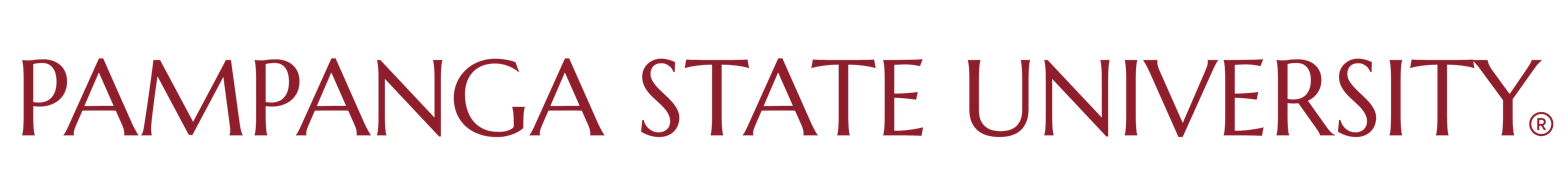

- Location in Luzon Location in the Philippines

Pampanga State University (Pampanga State U), formerly and still commonly referred to as Don Honorio Ventura State University (DHVSU) is a state university in Bacolor, Pampanga, Philippines. It was founded by Augustinian friar, Fr. Juan P. Zita as “Escuela de Artes y Oficios de Bacolor” on November 4, 1861 upon the approval of Governor-General José Lémery e Ibarrola. The university has eight regular campuses in Apalit, Candaba, Porac, Mexico, Santo Tomas, Lubao, City of San Fernando, and Floridablanca in the province of Pampanga. It is the oldest state university in the Philippines that remains in operation and is recognized as the oldest vocational school in Far East Asia.

== History ==
The beginnings of Pampanga State University can be traced to a vision shared by Fr. Juan P. Zita, an Augustinian friar who wished to uplift the youth of Bacolor through skills training. With the support of civic leader Don Felino Gil, this vision took formal shape when Governor-General José Lémery e Ibarrola approved the creation of the “Escuela de Artes y Oficios de Bacolor” on November 4, 1861. The school was established on land donated by the Suarez sisters, laying the foundation for what would become the oldest state university in the Philippines, the second-oldest public educational institution in the country after the Philippine Merchant Marine Academy, which was established in 1820, and the oldest vocational institution in the Far East Asia.

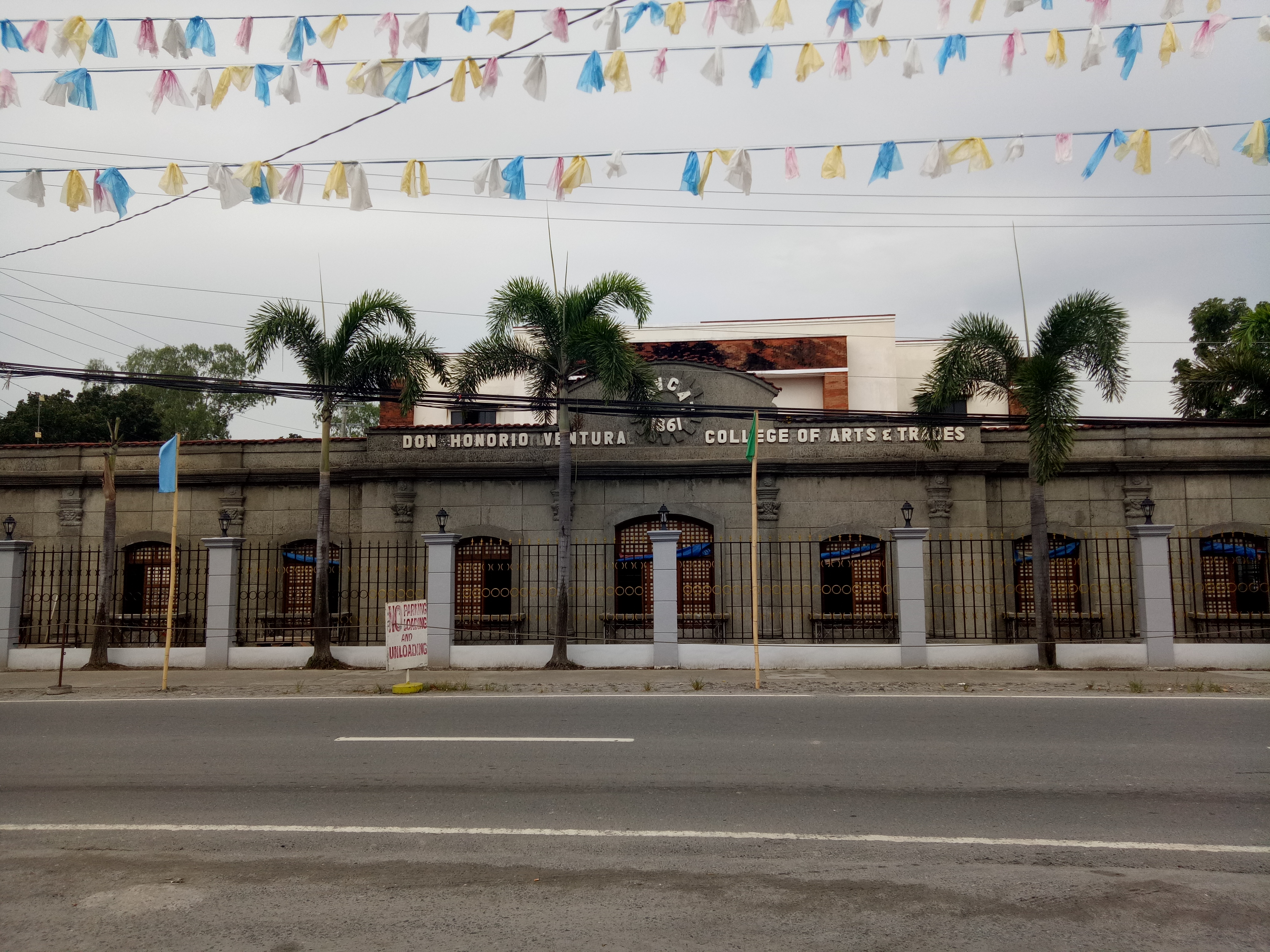
Pampanga State University Facade in 2019

Over the years, the school faced numerous setbacks, having been burned down five times, from an unexplained fire in 1869 to later incidents linked to its use as military quarters, an ammunition facility, and finally during the Japanese retreat in 1944, with the last major fire occurring in 1958. Despite these repeated losses, the institution was consistently rebuilt. The school also figured prominently in early Philippine governance. It hosted sessions of the Taft Commission, which on February 13, 1901 proclaimed Bacolor native Ceferino Joven as the first civil governor of Pampanga and the Philippines. It likewise served as the Provincial Capitol from 1901 to 1903 before briefly becoming the municipal building of Bacolor.

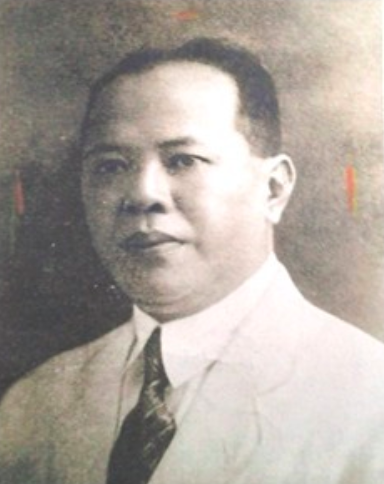
Don Honorio Ventura y Tizón

Through the decades, the institution evolved through several name changes, Bacolor Trade School in 1905, Pampanga Trade School in 1909, and later the Pampanga School of Arts and Trades under Republic Act 1388, which expanded its technical programs. In 1964, it was renamed Don Honorio Ventura Memorial School of Arts and Trades to honor former Pampanga Governor and philanthropist Don Honorio Ventura.

The school continued to grow academically, introducing the BS Industrial Education program in 1966 and graduating its first class in 1969. With the support of former Solicitor-General and Pampanga Governor Estelito P. Mendoza, the institution was elevated to state college status on May 5, 1978 through Presidential Decree No. 1373, adopting the name Don Honorio Ventura College of Arts and Trades (DHVCAT). This transition marked a new direction, as leaders envisioned the college as a major academic hub in Central Luzon, one that would offer accessible education, produce skilled professionals, and contribute to the region’s economic progress.

The 1991 Mount Pinatubo Eruption and the devastating lahar flows that continued into 1995, which buried much of Bacolor and left the main campus unusable. Almost all facilities, equipment, and instructional resources were lost, yet the administration remained steadfast in its commitment to continue operations. During this period, classes were temporarily moved to the Bulaon Resettlement Area in the City of San Fernando, while non-teaching staff held offices in Plaza Garcia, also in San Fernando.

Despite dire predictions that Bacolor might disappear entirely due to volcanic activity, the leadership under President Ernesto T. Nicdao sought long-term solutions. This led to the development of satellite campuses, beginning with the acquisition of a 2.47-hectare property in San Juan, Mexico, Pampanga in 1996, where new buildings were constructed to serve students from nearby municipalities. Additional tech-voc, engineering, and education courses were offered in this campus. Through the efforts of Congresswoman Zenaida Ducut, another facility was established in San Roque Dau, Lubao, which hosted basic engineering programs from 1997 to 2000.

In 2006, DHVCAT entered a period of renewed growth. With the support of local leaders and the initiative of College President Dr. Enrique G. Baking, the institution expanded its infrastructure and secured significant funding through the Republic Act No. 9506 (Bacolor Rehabilitation Act) to further develop its facilities. A strengthened faculty development program also enabled instructors and staff to pursue graduate studies aligned with their specializations.

On December 9, 2009, when President Gloria Macapagal-Arroyo signed Republic Act 9832 at the University Gymnasium, officially elevating the Don Honorio Ventura College of Arts and Trades to Don Honorio Ventura Technological State University (DHVTSU). The transition marked a new chapter, enabling the institution to pursue its mission with wider scope and greater impact.

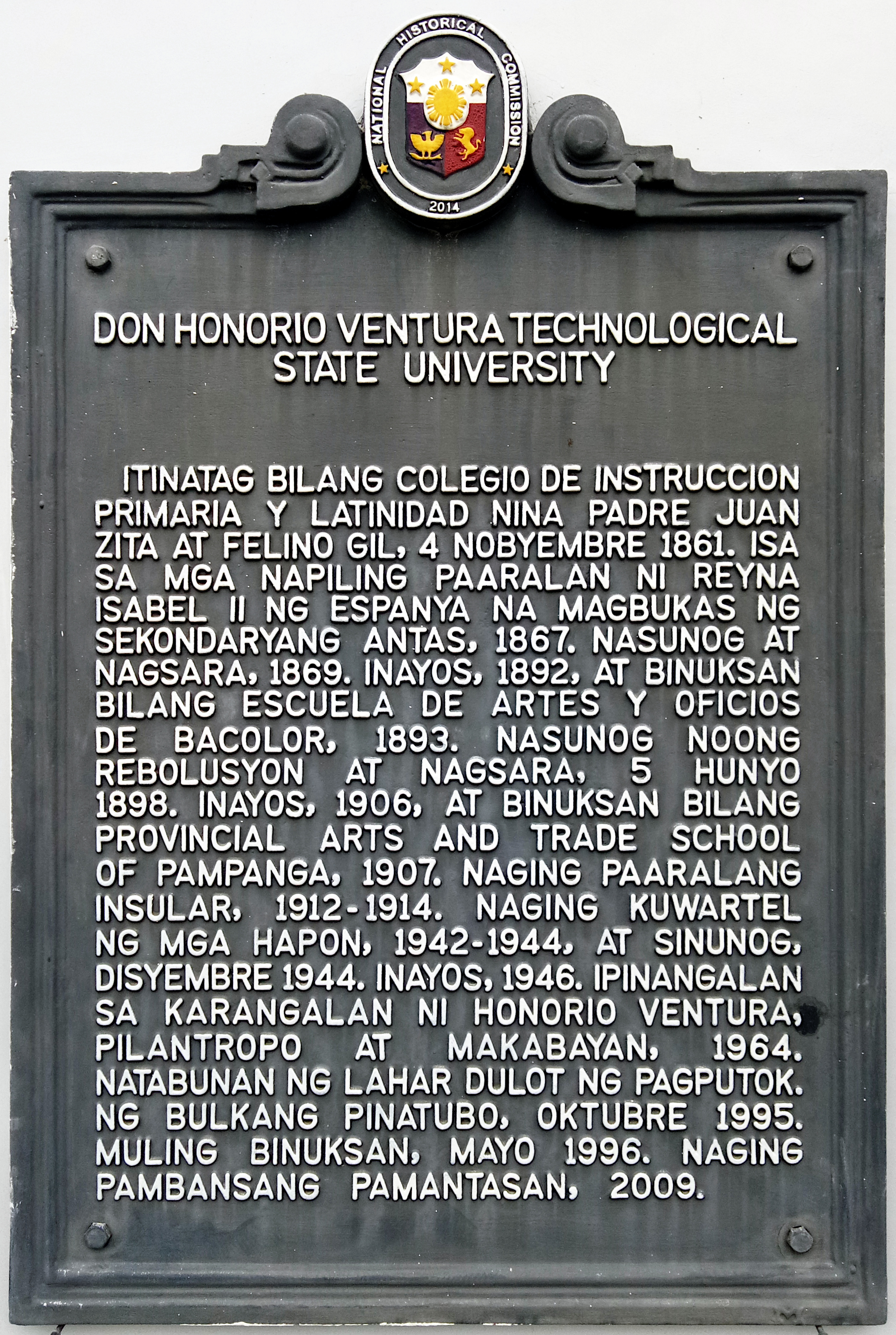
National historical marker installed in 2014

DHVTSU continued to evolve, strengthening its presence in Pampanga and the broader region. Through the combined initiatives of university leaders and the steady backing of government officials, the institution was renamed Don Honorio Ventura State University (DHVSU). This change was made possible by Republic Act No. 11169, authored by Congressman Aurelio “Dong” D. Gonzales Jr. and signed into law on January 3, 2019, allowing the university to broaden its academic reach beyond technological fields.

Demonstrating its ongoing commitment to accessible and relevant education, DHVSU achieved another milestone when its extension campuses were converted into regular campuses under Republic Act No. 11781, signed on May 29, 2022. This included campuses in Sto. Tomas, Porac, Lubao, Candaba, Apalit, and Mexico further expanding DHVSU’s presence throughout Pampanga.

The Republic Act No. 12148, signed by President Ferdinand R. Marcos Jr. on April 21, 2025, further expanded the university’s mandate and renamed it Pampanga State University. The law allows Pampanga State University to offer a wide array of undergraduate, graduate, and professional programs across its existing and future campuses. This development positions the university to better serve students, foster innovation, and contribute to the sustainable development of Pampanga and the Central Luzon region. The inauguration was held on June 27, 2025 at Dr. Ernesto T. Nicdao Sports Center.

== Academic Programs ==
Pampanga State University offers a wide range of high-quality academic programs from law and graduate studies to health and sciences, business, computing, engineering, education, and industrial technology, providing the Kapampangans with diverse pathways to develop their skills and prepare for professional success.

=== School of Law ===
- Juris Doctor

=== Graduate School ===
- Doctor of Education
  - Major in Educational Management
- Doctor of Public Administration
- Master of Arts in Education
  - Major in Educational Management
  - Major in Filipino
  - Major in Mathematics
  - Major in English
  - Major in Physical Education
  - Major in Technology and Livelihood Education
  - Major in Social Studies
  - Major in General Science
- Master of Science in Social Work
- Master in Public Administration
  - Major in Regulatory Management System
- Master in Business Administration
- Master of Engineering Management
- Master of Arts in Guidance And Counseling
- Master in Information Technology

=== College of Arts and Sciences ===
- Bachelor of Science in Biology
- Bachelor of Science in Environmental Science
- Bachelor of Science in Mathematics
- Bachelor of Science in Statistics

=== College of Business Studies ===
- Bachelor of Science in Business Administration
  - Major in Marketing Management
  - Major in Business Economics
- Bachelor of Science in Entrepreneurship
- Bachelor of Science in Accountancy
- Bachelor of Science in Accounting Information System
- Bachelor of Public Administration
- Bachelor of Science in Legal Management
- Bachelor of Science in Logistics and Supply Chain Management
- Bachelor of Science in Real Estate Management

=== College of Computing Studies ===
- Associate in Computer Technology
- Bachelor of Science in Information Technology
- Bachelor of Science in Information Systems
- Bachelor of Science in Computer Science

=== College of Education ===
- Bachelor of Early Childhood Education
- Bachelor of Elementary Education
- Bachelor of Secondary Education
  - Major in English
  - Major in Filipino
  - Major in Mathematics
  - Major in General Science
  - Major in Social Studies
- Bachelor of Technology and Livelihood Education
  - Major in Home Economics
  - Major in Industrial Arts
- Bachelor of Technical Vocational Teacher Education
  - Major in Food and Service Management
  - Major in Garments, Fashion and Technology
- Bachelor of Physical Education
- Bachelor of Science in Exercise and Sports Science
  - Major in Fitness and Sports Coaching
  - Major in Fitness and Sports Management
- Bachelor of Culture and Arts Education

=== College of Engineering and Architecture ===
- Bachelor of Science in Architecture
- Bachelor of Science in Civil Engineering
- Bachelor of Science in Electrical Engineering
- Bachelor of Science in Mechanical Engineering
- Bachelor of Science in Industrial Engineering
- Bachelor of Science in Electronics Engineering
- Bachelor of Science in Computer Engineering
- Bachelor of Science in Manufacturing Engineering

=== College of Hospitality and Tourism Management ===
- Bachelor of Science in Hospitality Management
- Bachelor of Science in Tourism Management
- Bachelor of Science in Tourism Management with Specialization in Events Management

=== College of Industrial Technology ===
- Bachelor of Science in Industrial Technology with Specialization in:
  - Automotive Technology
  - Beauty Care and Wellness
  - Electrical Technology
  - Electronics Technology
  - Food And Service Management
  - Garments And Fashion Design
  - Graphics Technology
  - Instrumentation and Control Technology
  - Mechanical Technology
  - Mechatronics Technology
  - Welding Technology
  - Woodworking Technology

=== College of Nursing and Allied Health Sciences ===
- Bachelor in Science in Nursing

=== College of Social Sciences and Philosophy ===
- Bachelor in Human Services
- Bachelor of Science in Psychology
- Bachelor of Science in Social Work
- Bachelor of Arts in Sociology

=== Laboratory High School ===
- Junior High School

=== Expanded Tertiary Equivalency and Accreditation Program (ETEEAP) ===
- Bachelor in Public Administration

== University Campuses ==
The Pampanga State University has nine campuses across the province, with the Bacolor Campus (Don Honorio Ventura Campus) serving as its main campus.

Pampanga State University Campuses
Campus	Year Founded	Address
Don Honorio Ventura Campus (Bacolor Campus)	1861	Barangay Cabambangan, Bacolor, Pampanga
Mexico Campus	1996	Barangay San Juan, Mexico, Pampanga
Porac Campus	2012	Barangay Pio, Porac, Pampanga
Santo Tomas Campus	2013	Barangay San Nicolas, Santo Tomas, Pampanga
Lubao Campus	2018	Barangay Santa Catalina, Lubao, Pampanga
Candaba Campus	2020	Barangay Pasig, Candaba, Pampanga
Apalit Campus	2020	Barangay Sampaloc, Apalit, Pampanga
City of San Fernando Campus	2024	Barangay Malino, City of San Fernando, Pampanga
Floridablanca Campus	2026	Barangay Santa Monica, Floridablanca, Pampanga

== Notable alumni ==
- Eddie Panlilio - former Roman Catholic priest and Governor of the province of Pampanga.
- Jayson Castro - Filipino professional basketball player of the Philippine Basketball Association.
