= 2021 PBA Governors' Cup finals =

2021 edition of the PBA Governors' Cup finals

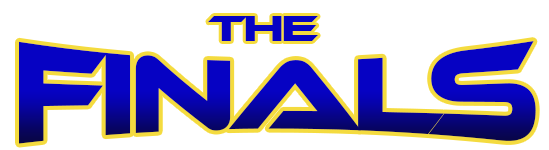
Team	Coach	Wins
(6) Barangay Ginebra San Miguel	Tim Cone	4
(4) Meralco Bolts	Norman Black	2
- Dates: April 6–22, 2022
- MVP: Scottie Thompson (Barangay Ginebra San Miguel)
- Television: Local: One Sports; TV5; PBA Rush (HD); International: AksyonTV International
- Announcers: see Broadcast notes
- Radio network: Radyo5 (DWFM)
- Announcers: see Broadcast notes

Referees
- Game 1: Rommel Gruta, Bing Oliva, Mike Flordeliza, Gomer Obina
- Game 2: Nol Quilingen, Mardy Montoya, Mike Flordeliza, Janine Nicandro
- Game 3: Peter Balao, Sherwin Pineda, Rommel Gruta, Albert Nubla
- Game 4: Peter Balao, Mardy Montoya, Mike Flordeliza, Niño Cortez
- Game 5: Nol Quilingen, Rommel Gruta, Mike Flordeliza, Albert Nubla
- Game 6: Peter Balao, Sherwin Pineda, Mardy Montoya, Niño Cortez

PBA Governors' Cup finals chronology
- < 2019 2023 >

PBA finals chronology
- < 2021 Philippine 2022 Philippine >

The 2021 Philippine Basketball Association (PBA) Governors' Cup finals (or PBA Season 46 Governors' Cup finals) was the best-of-7 championship series of the 2021 PBA Governors' Cup, and the conclusion of the conference's playoffs. The playoffs were delayed into 2022 due to the COVID-19 pandemic.

The Barangay Ginebra San Miguel and the Meralco Bolts competed for the 20th Governors' Cup championship and the 130th overall championship contested by the league. This was the fourth time that Barangay Ginebra and Meralco competed for the Governors' Cup championship in the span of six seasons. Barangay Ginebra won the three previous championships against Meralco in 2016, 2017, and 2019. Barangay Ginebra defeated Meralco in six games to win their fourth Governors' Cup title in five seasons. They are the lowest-seeded team since the San Miguel Beermen in the 2019 Commissioner's Cup to win a PBA title. Scottie Thompson was named the finals' MVP.

== Background ==
=== Road to the finals ===
Barangay Ginebra San Miguel		Meralco Bolts
Finished 6–5 (.636) in 6th place	Elimination round	Finished 7–4 (.636) in 4th place
win over the other against Alaska	Tiebreaker	—N/a
Def. TNT in two games (twice-to-win disadvantage)	Quarterfinals	Def. San Miguel in one game (twice-to-beat advantage)
Def. NLEX, 3–1	Semifinals	Def. Magnolia, 3–2

=== Head-to-head matchup ===
One Sports

February 13, 2022
6:45 pm

Box score

Barangay Ginebra San Miguel 95, Meralco Bolts 101
Scoring by quarter: 22–29, 24–16, 30–34, 19–22
Pts: Brownlee 27; Rebs: Brownlee 14; Asts: Pinto 9	Pts: Bishop 30; Rebs: Bishop 13; Asts: Bishop, Newsome 7

Smart Araneta Coliseum, Quezon City
Referees: Rommel Gruta, Bing Oliva, Mike Flordeliza, Gomer Obina

== Series summary ==
Game	Date	Venue	Winner	Result
Game 1	April 6, 2022	Smart Araneta Coliseum	Meralco	104–91
Game 2	April 8, 2022	SM Mall of Asia Arena	Barangay Ginebra	99–93
Game 3	April 10, 2022	SM Mall of Asia Arena	Meralco	83–74
Game 4	April 13, 2022	Smart Araneta Coliseum	Barangay Ginebra	95–84
Game 5	April 17, 2022	Smart Araneta Coliseum	Barangay Ginebra	115–110
Game 6	April 22, 2022	SM Mall of Asia Arena	Barangay Ginebra	103–92

== Game summaries ==
=== Game 1 ===
One Sports

April 6, 2022
6:00 pm

Box score

Barangay Ginebra San Miguel 91, Meralco Bolts 104
Scoring by quarter: 23–25, 19–28, 18–25, 31–26
Pts: Brownlee 27; Rebs: Standhardinger 14; Asts: Thompson 10	Pts: Maliksi 22; Rebs: Bishop 12; Asts: Newsome 7
Meralco leads series, 1–0

Smart Araneta Coliseum, Quezon City
Attendance: 12,457
Referees: Jimmy Mariano, Sherwin Pineda, Albert Nubla, Joel Baldago

=== Game 2 ===
One Sports

April 8, 2022
6:00 pm

Box score

Barangay Ginebra San Miguel 99, Meralco Bolts 93
Scoring by quarter: 20–23, 40–19, 22–29, 17–22
Pts: Brownlee 36; Rebs: Brownlee 13; Asts: Brownlee 9	Pts: Bishop 31; Rebs: Bishop 13; Asts: Black 6
Series tied, 1–1

SM Mall of Asia Arena, Pasay
Attendance: 12,248
Referees: Nol Quilingen, Mardy Montoya, Mike Flordeliza, Janine Nicandro

=== Game 3 ===
One Sports

April 10, 2022
6:30 pm

Box score

Barangay Ginebra San Miguel 74, Meralco Bolts 83
Scoring by quarter: 27–22, 21–18, 13–22, 13–21
Pts: Brownlee 19; Rebs: Brownlee 15; Asts: Brownlee 7	Pts: Bishop 30; Rebs: Bishop 16; Asts: Newsome 6
Meralco leads series, 2–1

SM Mall of Asia Arena, Pasay
Attendance: 16,104
Referees: Peter Balao, Sherwin Pineda, Rommel Gruta, Albert Nubla

=== Game 4 ===
Prior to the game, Barangay Ginebra's Scottie Thompson was awarded his first Best Player of the Conference award, and Barangay Ginebra import and Thompson's teammate Justin Brownlee was awarded the Best Import of the Conference award for the second time.

One Sports

April 13, 2022
6:00 pm

Box score

Barangay Ginebra San Miguel 95, Meralco Bolts 84
Scoring by quarter: 24–21, 17–20, 27–13, 27–30
Pts: Brownlee, Thompson 27; Rebs: Brownlee 18; Asts: Brownlee 7	Pts: Bishop 25; Rebs: Almazan, Black 9 Asts: Newsome 5
Series tied, 2–2

Smart Araneta Coliseum, Quezon City
Attendance: 17,298
Referees: Peter Balao, Mardy Montoya, Mike Flordeliza, Niño Cortez

=== Game 5 ===
One Sports

April 17, 2022
6:30 pm

Box score

Barangay Ginebra San Miguel 115, Meralco Bolts 110
Scoring by quarter: 25–22, 29–21, 28–30, 33 –37
Pts: Brownlee 40; Rebs: Brownlee 11; Asts: Thompson 11	Pts: Bishop 30; Rebs: Bishop 15; Asts: Black, Newsome 5
Barangay Ginebra leads series, 3–2

Smart Araneta Coliseum, Quezon City
Attendance: 18,251
Referees: Nol Quilingen, Rommel Gruta, Mike Flordeliza, Albert Nubla

=== Game 6 ===
The game was initially scheduled on April 20, 2022, at Smart Araneta Coliseum, but was later postponed to April 22 as fire broke out in one area of the arena during the preliminary round of the 2021 PBA 3x3 season – Second conference Grand Finals earlier in the day.

One Sports

April 22, 2022
6:00 pm

Box score

Barangay Ginebra San Miguel 103, Meralco Bolts 92
Scoring by quarter: 19–24, 28–23, 31–26, 25–19
Pts: Tenorio 30; Rebs: Brownlee 16; Asts: Brownlee 6	Pts: Bishop 21; Rebs: Bishop 16; Asts: Newsome 6
Barangay Ginebra wins series, 4–2

SM Mall of Asia Arena, Pasay
Attendance: 20,224
Referees: Peter Balao, Sherwin Pineda, Mardy Montoya, Niño Cortez

== Rosters ==
Barangay Ginebra San Miguel roster
Players
Coaches

Pos.	#	POB	Name	Height	Weight	DOB (YYYY–MM–DD)	From
G/F	2	(United States)	Jared Dillinger (injured)	6 ft 4 in (1.93 m)	220 lb (100 kg)	1984–01–06	Hawaiʻi
G	3	(Philippines)	Kent Salado	5 ft 9 in (1.75 m)		1994–11–10	Arellano
G	5	(Philippines)	LA Tenorio (C)	5 ft 9 in (1.75 m)	151 lb (68 kg)	1984–07–09	Ateneo
G	6	(Philippines)	Scottie Thompson	6 ft 1 in (1.85 m)	180 lb (82 kg)	1993–07–12	UPHSD
F	10	(Philippines)	Arvin Tolentino	6 ft 5 in (1.96 m)	210 lb (95 kg)	1995–11–05	Far Eastern
G	11	(United States)	Stanley Pringle (injured)	6 ft 1 in (1.85 m)	190 lb (86 kg)	1987–03–05	Penn State
F/C	12	(Philippines)	Prince Caperal	6 ft 7 in (2.01 m)	230 lb (104 kg)	1993–06–12	Arellano
G/F	14	(United States)	Brian Enriquez (R)	6 ft 3 in (1.91 m)	200 lb (91 kg)	1995–10–19	William Woods
G/F	16	(Philippines)	Jeff Chan	6 ft 2 in (1.88 m)	185 lb (84 kg)	1983–02–11	Far Eastern
G	17	(Philippines)	John Pinto	5 ft 11 in (1.80 m)	170 lb (77 kg)	1990–10–15	Arellano
F	23	(Philippines)	Raymond Aguilar	6 ft 4 in (1.93 m)	200 lb (91 kg)	1985–07–27	National-U
F/C	25	(Philippines)	Japeth Aguilar	6 ft 9 in (2.06 m)	235 lb (107 kg)	1987–01–25	Western Kentucky
F	27	(Philippines)	Sidney Onwubere	6 ft 4 in (1.93 m)		1993–08–01	Emilio Aguinaldo
F	31	(Philippines)	Aljon Mariano	6 ft 3 in (1.91 m)	175 lb (79 kg)	1992–08–03	UST
F	32	(United States)	Justin Brownlee (I)	6 ft 6 in (1.98 m)	220 lb (100 kg)	1988–04–23	St. John's
F/C	34	(Germany)	Christian Standhardinger	6 ft 8 in (2.03 m)	220 lb (100 kg)	1989–07–04	Hawaiʻi
F	38	(United States)	Joe Devance	6 ft 7 in (2.01 m)	225 lb (102 kg)	1982–02–19	UTEP
G	50	(Philippines)	MJ Ayaay	6 ft 1 in (1.85 m)		1993–08–03	Lyceum

Head coach

- (United States) Tim Cone

Assistant coach(es)

- (Philippines) Richard del Rosario (1st assistant)
- (Philippines) Olsen Racela
- (Philippines) Freddie Abuda
- (United States) Kirk Collier

Team manager

- (Philippines) Alfrancis Chua^{[a]}
- (Philippines) Raymond Rodriguez (assistant)

Legend

- (C) Team captain
- (CI) Commissioner's Cup Import
- (GI) Governors' Cup Import
- (EI) EASL Import
- (DP) Unsigned draft pick
- (FA) Free agent
- (IN) Inactive
- (S) Suspended
- (R) Rookie
- Injured

Roster

- ^{a} Also serves as Barangay Ginebra's board governor.

Meralco Bolts roster
Players
Coaches

Pos.	#	POB	Name	Height	Weight	DOB (YYYY–MM–DD)	From
G	1	(Philippines)	Aaron Black	6 ft 1 in (1.85 m)	180 lb (82 kg)	1996–12–03	Ateneo
F	3	(United States)	Tony Bishop (I)	6 ft 7 in (2.01 m)	220 lb (100 kg)	1989–07–16	Texas State
G	5	(United States)	Chris Banchero	6 ft 1 in (1.85 m)	175 lb (79 kg)	1989–01–24	Seattle Pacific
F	6	(Philippines)	Raymar Jose	6 ft 4 in (1.93 m)	210 lb (95 kg)	1992–08–06	Far Eastern
F	7	(United States)	Cliff Hodge (C)	6 ft 4 in (1.93 m)	195 lb (88 kg)	1988–02–03	Reedley
G/F	11	(United States)	Chris Newsome	6 ft 2 in (1.88 m)	190 lb (86 kg)	1990–07–25	Ateneo
F	12	(Philippines)	Mac Belo	6 ft 4 in (1.93 m)	185 lb (84 kg)	1993–02–12	Far Eastern
F	14	(Philippines)	Michael Cañete	6 ft 4 in (1.93 m)		1993–08–14	Arellano
G	17	(Philippines)	Anjo Caram	5 ft 7 in (1.70 m)	159 lb (72 kg)	1991–01–14	San Beda
G/F	19	(Philippines)	Bong Quinto	6 ft 2 in (1.88 m)		1994–12–15	Letran
C	20	(Philippines)	Raymond Almazan	6 ft 8 in (2.03 m)	194 lb (88 kg)	1989–08–02	Letran
F/C	21	(Philippines)	Reynel Hugnatan	6 ft 5 in (1.96 m)	210 lb (95 kg)	1978–11–03	Manila
G/F	22	(Philippines)	Allein Maliksi	6 ft 3 in (1.91 m)	180 lb (82 kg)	1987–09–18	UST
G/F	23	(Philippines)	Alvin Pasaol (R)	6 ft 2 in (1.88 m)	200 lb (91 kg)	1995–05–06	UE
F/C	50	(Philippines)	Nonoy Baclao	6 ft 5 in (1.96 m)	190 lb (86 kg)	1987–06–15	Ateneo
F	81	(Philippines)	Jammer Jamito	6 ft 5 in (1.96 m)	190 lb (86 kg)	1990–09–01	St. Clare

Head coach

- (United States) Norman Black

Assistant coach(es)

- (Philippines) Ronnie Magsanoc (1st assistant)
- (Philippines) Luigi Trillo
- (Philippines) Gene Afable
- (Philippines) Patrick Fran
- (Philippines) Charles Tiu

Team manager

- (Philippines) Paolo Trillo

Legend

- (C) Team captain
- (CI) Commissioner's Cup Import
- (GI) Governors' Cup Import
- (EI) EASL Import
- (DP) Unsigned draft pick
- (FA) Free agent
- (IN) Inactive
- (S) Suspended
- (R) Rookie
- Injured

Roster

== Broadcast notes ==
The Governors' Cup Finals was aired on TV5 with simulcast on PBA Rush (both in standard and high definition). TV5's radio arm, Radyo5 provided the radio play-by-play coverage. The One Sports network did not air games 1 and 2 as it aired the 2022 PVL Open Conference Finals, which happened on the same time as the PBA finals.

One Sports provided online livestreaming via the PusoPilipinas and Smart Sports Facebook pages using the TV5 and PBA Rush feeds respectively.

The PBA Rush broadcast provided English-language coverage of the Finals.

Game	TV5 and One Sports			SMART Sports (English & Filipino)	
Game	Play-by-play	Analyst(s)	Courtside reporters	Play-by-play	Analyst(s)
Game 1	Charlie Cuna	Dominic Uy	Denise Tan and Ysa Chong	Jutt Sulit	Vince Hizon
Game 2	Jutt Sulit	Joaquin Henson	Denise Tan and Eileen Shi	Carlo Pamintuan	Mark Molina
Game 3	Magoo Marjon	Andy Jao	Denise Tan and Ysa Chong	Jinno Rufino	Jolly Escobar
Game 4	Charlie Cuna	Andy Jao	Denise Tan and Ira Pablo-Neypes	Anthony Suntay	Vince Hizon
Game 5	Sev Sarmenta	Dominic Uy	Denise Tan and Ysa Chong	Andre Co	Jolly Escobar
Game 6	Magoo Marjon	Joaquin Henson	Denise Tan and Ira Pablo-Neypes	Jinno Rufino	Mark Molina

- Additional Game 6 crew:
  - Trophy presentation: Jutt Sulit
  - Celebration interviewer: Denise Tan
