= 2023–24 Meralco Bolts season =

- Head coach: Luigi Trillo
- General Manager: Paolo Trillo
- Owner(s): Manila Electric Company (an MVP Group subsidiary)

Commissioner's Cup results
- Record: 8–3 (72.7%)
- Place: 5th
- Playoff finish: Quarterfinalist (lost to Phoenix Super LPG with twice-to-win disadvantage)

Philippine Cup results
- Record: 6–5 (54.5%)
- Place: 3rd
- Playoff finish: Champions (Defeated San Miguel, 4–2)

Meralco Bolts seasons

The 2023–24 Meralco Bolts season was the 13th season of the franchise in the Philippine Basketball Association (PBA).

== Key dates ==
- September 17: The PBA season 48 draft was held at the Market! Market! in Taguig.

== Draft picks ==
Round	Pick	Player	Position	Place of birth	College
1	8	Brandon Bates	C	Australia	De La Salle
3	32	Jolo Mendoza	G	Philippines	Ateneo
4	43	Zach Huang	F	Philippines	UST
5	54	Jessie Sumoda	C	Philippines	San Sebastian
6	62	Shean Jackson	G	USA	Cheyenne HS

== Roster ==
2023–24 Meralco Bolts roster
Players
Coaches

Pos.	#	POB	Name	Height	Weight	DOB (YYYY–MM–DD)	From
G	1	(Philippines)	Aaron Black	6 ft 1 in (1.85 m)	180 lb (82 kg)	1996–12–03	Ateneo
G	4	(Philippines)	Diego Dario	5 ft 8 in (1.73 m)	145 lb (66 kg)	1997–01–06	UP Diliman
G	6	(United States)	Chris Banchero	6 ft 1 in (1.85 m)	175 lb (79 kg)	1989–01–24	Seattle Pacific
F	7	(United States)	Cliff Hodge	6 ft 4 in (1.93 m)	195 lb (88 kg)	1988–02–03	Hawaii Pacific
G	10	(Philippines)	Jolo Mendoza (R)	5 ft 10 in (1.78 m)		1998–01–31	Ateneo
G/F	11	(United States)	Chris Newsome	6 ft 2 in (1.88 m)	190 lb (86 kg)	1990–07–25	Ateneo
G	17	(Philippines)	Anjo Caram	5 ft 7 in (1.70 m)	159 lb (72 kg)	1991–01–14	San Beda
F	19	(Philippines)	Bong Quinto	6 ft 2 in (1.88 m)		1994–12–15	Letran
C	20	(Philippines)	Raymond Almazan (C)	6 ft 8 in (2.03 m)	194 lb (88 kg)	1989–08–02	Letran
F	22	(Philippines)	Allein Maliksi	6 ft 4 in (1.93 m)	180 lb (82 kg)	1987–09–18	UST
F	23	(Philippines)	Alvin Pasaol	6 ft 2 in (1.88 m)	200 lb (91 kg)	1995–05–06	UE
F	24	(Philippines)	Raymar Jose	6 ft 4 in (1.93 m)	210 lb (95 kg)	1992–08–06	Far Eastern
F	27	(Philippines)	Jansen Rios	6 ft 3 in (1.91 m)	185 lb (84 kg)	1991–10–28	Adamson
F/C	29	(Canada)	Norbert Torres	6 ft 7 in (2.01 m)	250 lb (113 kg)	1990–01–12	De La Salle
F/C	32	(United States)	Kyle Pascual	6 ft 6 in (1.98 m)	210 lb (95 kg)	1990–04–13	San Beda
C	33	(Australia)	Brandon Bates (R)	6 ft 9 in (2.06 m)	231 lb (105 kg)	1997–08–12	De La Salle

Head coach

- (Philippines) Luigi Trillo

Assistant coach(es)

- (Philippines) Gene Afable (1st assistant)
- (Philippines) Reynel Hugnatan
- (Philippines) Sandro Soriano
- (Serbia) Nenad Vučinić (active consultant)
- (United States) Norman Black (consultant)

Team manager

- (Philippines) Paolo Trillo

Legend

- (C) Team captain
- (CI) Commissioner's Cup Import
- (GI) Governors' Cup Import
- (EI) EASL Import
- (DP) Unsigned draft pick
- (FA) Free agent
- (IN) Inactive
- (S) Suspended
- (R) Rookie
- Injured

Roster

== Preseason ==
=== PBA on Tour ===
==== Game log ====
2023 PBA on Tour game log
Total: 7–4
May: 1–1

Game	Date	Opponent	Score	High points	High rebounds	High assists	Location Attendance	Record
1	May 24	NorthPort	W 97–89	Allein Maliksi (21)	Raymar Jose (12)	Alvin Pasaol (7)	Ynares Sports Arena	1–0
2	May 28	Phoenix Super LPG	L 93–100	Anjo Caram (24)	Jose, Torres (9)	Bong Quinto (11)	Ynares Sports Arena	1–1

June: 3–1

Game	Date	Opponent	Score	High points	High rebounds	High assists	Location Attendance	Record
3	June 4	Converge	W 96–88	Allein Maliksi (16)	Raymond Almazan (14)	Bong Quinto (5)	Ynares Center	2–1
4	June 10	San Miguel	W 92–89	Allein Maliksi (21)	Raymond Almazan (14)	Anjo Caram (7)	Tiaong Convention Center	3–1
5	June 18	Terrafirma	L 102–107	Allein Maliksi (33)	Cliff Hodge (15)	Bong Quinto (10)	Ynares Sports Arena	3–2
6	June 28	TNT	W 108–90	Allein Maliksi (28)	Cliff Hodge (13)	Bong Quinto (7)	Ynares Sports Arena	4–2

July: 3–2

Game	Date	Opponent	Score	High points	High rebounds	High assists	Location Attendance	Record
7	July 2	Magnolia	L 101–121	Diego Dario (22)	Bong Quinto (9)	Allein Maliksi (7)	Filoil EcoOil Centre	4–3
8	July 5	Barangay Ginebra	W 106–93	Allein Maliksi (23)	Raymond Almazan (12)	Cliff Hodge (6)	Quadricentennial Pavilion	5–3
9	July 12	NLEX	W 96–83	Alvin Pasaol (25)	Raymond Almazan (8)	Aaron Black (9)	Ynares Sports Arena	6–3
10	July 14	Blackwater	L 82–89	Almazan, Quinto (18)	Raymond Almazan (14)	Diego Dario (4)	Ynares Sports Arena	6–4
11	July 28	Rain or Shine	W 103–95	Raymar Jose (22)	Raymar Jose (18)	Aaron Black (10)	Ynares Sports Arena	7–4

=== MassKara Festival exhibition ===
==== Game log ====
2023 PBA MassKara Festival exhibition game log
Total: 0–1
October: 0–1

Game	Date	Opponent	Score	High points	High rebounds	High assists	Location Attendance	Record
1	October 19	Rain or Shine	L 81–94	Diego Dario (20)	Raymar Jose (11)	Black, Dario, Pasaol (3)	La Salle Coliseum	0–1

== Commissioner's Cup ==
=== Eliminations ===
==== Standings ====
Pos	Team	W	L	PCT	GB	Qualification
1	Magnolia Chicken Timplados Hotshots	9	2	.818	—	Twice-to-beat in quarterfinals
2	San Miguel Beermen	8	3	.727 (Note: Head-to-head quotient: San Miguel 1.17, Barangay Ginebra 0.99, Phoenix Super LPG 0.98, Meralco 0.89)	1	Twice-to-beat in quarterfinals
3	Barangay Ginebra San Miguel	8	3	.727	1	Twice-to-beat in quarterfinals
4	Phoenix Super LPG Fuel Masters	8	3	.727	1	Twice-to-beat in quarterfinals
5	Meralco Bolts	8	3	.727	1	Twice-to-win in quarterfinals
6	NorthPort Batang Pier	6	5	.545 (Note: Head-to-head record: NorthPort 1–0 Rain or Shine)	3	Twice-to-win in quarterfinals
7	Rain or Shine Elasto Painters	6	5	.545	3	Twice-to-win in quarterfinals
8	TNT Tropang Giga	5	6	.455	4	Twice-to-win in quarterfinals
9	NLEX Road Warriors	4	7	.364	5	
10	Terrafirma Dyip	2	9	.182	7	
11	Blackwater Bossing	1	10	.091 (Note: Head-to-head record: Blackwater 1–0 Converge)	8	
12	Converge FiberXers	1	10	.091	8	

Source: PBA.ph
Rules for classification: 1) winning percentage; 2) if two teams are tied, head-to-head record; if three or more teams are tied, head-to-head goal average (quotient); if tied for 8th, one-game playoff; 3) overall quotient; 4) coin toss

==== Game log ====
2023–24 PBA Commissioner's Cup game log
Total: 8–3
November: 3–1

Game	Date	Opponent	Score	High points	High rebounds	High assists	Location Attendance	Record
1	November 8	Rain or Shine	W 107–102	Suleiman Braimoh (34)	Suleiman Braimoh (14)	Aaron Black (4)	PhilSports Arena	1–0
2	November 11	Blackwater	W 91–84	Suleiman Braimoh (40)	Suleiman Braimoh (16)	Chris Newsome (6)	Ynares Center	2–0
3	November 19	San Miguel	L 83–93	Chris Newsome (22)	Suleiman Braimoh (12)	Chris Newsome (6)	Smart Araneta Coliseum	2–1
4	November 26	TNT	W 109–95	Suleiman Braimoh (37)	Raymond Almazan (11)	Chris Newsome (5)	PhilSports Arena	3–1

December: 3–1

Game	Date	Opponent	Score	High points	High rebounds	High assists	Location Attendance	Record
5	December 3	NLEX	W 97–94	Suleiman Braimoh (38)	Almazan, Braimoh (8)	Braimoh, Quinto (4)	PhilSports Arena	4–1
6	December 10	NorthPort	W 125–99	Zach Lofton (54)	Raymond Almazan (15)	Diego Dario (6)	PhilSports Arena	5–1
7	December 17	Converge	W 105–99	Zach Lofton (30)	Chris Newsome (10)	Cliff Hodge (7)	Ynares Center	6–1
8	December 22	Barangay Ginebra	L 96–110	Zach Lofton (23)	Cliff Hodge (8)	Zach Lofton (7)	Smart Araneta Coliseum	6–2

January: 2–1

Game	Date	Opponent	Score	High points	High rebounds	High assists	Location Attendance	Record
9	January 6	Magnolia	W 85–80	Shonn Miller (33)	Shonn Miller (22)	Banchero, Newsome (4)	University of San Agustin Gym	7–2
10	January 10	Phoenix Super LPG	L 83–93	Shonn Miller (19)	Shonn Miller (9)	Chris Newsome (7)	Smart Araneta Coliseum	7–3
11	January 12	Terrafirma	W 109–102	Shonn Miller (29)	Shonn Miller (21)	Bong Quinto (9)	Smart Araneta Coliseum	8–3

=== Playoffs ===
==== Bracket ====
Quarterfinals (Top 4 twice-to-beat)
1	Magnolia	109
8	TNT	94
4	Phoenix Super LPG	107	88
5	Meralco	116***	84
2	San Miguel	127
7	Rain or Shine	122
3	Barangay Ginebra	106
6	NorthPort	93

Semifinals (Best-of-5)
1	Magnolia	3
4	Phoenix Super LPG	1
2	San Miguel	3
3	Barangay Ginebra	0

Finals (Best-of-7)
1	Magnolia	2
2	San Miguel	4

***Game went into triple overtime

==== Game log ====
2023–24 PBA Commissioner's Cup playoffs game log
Total: 1–1
Quarterfinals: 1–1

Game	Date	Opponent	Score	High points	High rebounds	High assists	Location Attendance	Series
1	January 17	Phoenix Super LPG	W 116–107 (3OT)	Cliff Hodge (20)	Shonn Miller (20)	Newsome, Quinto (4)	PhilSports Arena	1–0
2	January 21	Phoenix Super LPG	L 84–88	Hodge, Maliksi, Newsome (15)	Shonn Miller (12)	Miller, Newsome (6)	SM Mall of Asia Arena	1–1

== Philippine Cup ==
=== Eliminations ===
==== Standings ====
Pos	Team	W	L	PCT	GB	Qualification
1	San Miguel Beermen	10	1	.909	—	Twice-to-beat in the quarterfinals
2	Barangay Ginebra San Miguel	7	4	.636	3	Twice-to-beat in the quarterfinals
3	Meralco Bolts	6	5	.545 (Note: Head-to-head quotient: Meralco 1.06, TNT 1.03, Rain or Shine 1.01, NLEX 0.99, Magnolia 0.90)	4	Best-of-three quarterfinals
4	TNT Tropang Giga	6	5	.545	4	Best-of-three quarterfinals
5	Rain or Shine Elasto Painters	6	5	.545	4	Best-of-three quarterfinals
6	NLEX Road Warriors	6	5	.545	4	Best-of-three quarterfinals
7	Magnolia Chicken Timplados Hotshots	6	5	.545	4	Twice-to-win in the quarterfinals
8	Terrafirma Dyip	5	6	.455 (Note: Eighth seed playoff: Terrafirma 104–96 NorthPort)	5	Twice-to-win in the quarterfinals
9	NorthPort Batang Pier	5	6	.455	5	
10	Blackwater Bossing	4	7	.364	6	
11	Phoenix Fuel Masters	3	8	.273	7	
12	Converge FiberXers	2	9	.182	8	

Source: PBA.ph
Rules for classification: 1) winning percentage; 2) if two teams are tied, head-to-head record; if three or more teams are tied, head-to-head goal average (quotient); if tied for 8th, one-game playoff; 3) overall quotient; 4) coin toss

==== Game log ====
2024 PBA Philippine Cup game log
Total: 6–5
February: 0–1

Game	Date	Opponent	Score	High points	High rebounds	High assists	Location Attendance	Record
1	February 28	Blackwater	L 93–96	Allein Maliksi (27)	Chris Newsome (7)	Banchero, Newsome (6)	Ynares Center	0–1

March: 2–2

Game	Date	Opponent	Score	High points	High rebounds	High assists	Location Attendance	Record
2	March 2	Rain or Shine	W 121–117 (OT)	Allein Maliksi (26)	Chris Newsome (11)	Bong Quinto (6)	Smart Araneta Coliseum	1–1
3	March 6	NLEX	L 96–99	Chris Newsome (22)	Chris Newsome (8)	Chris Newsome (4)	Smart Araneta Coliseum	1–2
4	March 10	NorthPort	L 85–90	Aaron Black (18)	Cliff Hodge (11)	Chris Banchero (5)	Smart Araneta Coliseum	1–3
5	March 15	Barangay Ginebra	W 91–73	Allein Maliksi (25)	Almazan, Black, Hodge (7)	Chris Newsome (4)	Smart Araneta Coliseum	2–3
All-Star Break

April: 3–2

Game	Date	Opponent	Score	High points	High rebounds	High assists	Location Attendance	Record
6	April 3	Terrafirma	W 86–83	Bong Quinto (18)	Chris Newsome (8)	Chris Newsome (8)	Smart Araneta Coliseum	3–3
7	April 7	TNT	L 90–92	Black, Hodge (16)	Aaron Black (8)	Chris Newsome (5)	Ninoy Aquino Stadium	3–4
8	April 21	Converge	L 99–104	Chris Newsome (25)	Cliff Hodge (9)	Aaron Black (6)	PhilSports Arena	3–5
9	April 26	Phoenix	W 82–76	Aaron Black (18)	Bates, Hodge (12)	Black, Quinto (4)	Smart Araneta Coliseum	4–5
10	April 28	Magnolia	W 74–51	Almazan, Newsome (12)	Raymond Almazan (11)	Chris Newsome (7)	PhilSports Arena	5–5

May: 1–0

Game	Date	Opponent	Score	High points	High rebounds	High assists	Location Attendance	Record
11	May 4	San Miguel	W 95–92	Cliff Hodge (20)	Cliff Hodge (13)	Chris Newsome (6)	Batangas City Sports Center	6–5

=== Playoffs ===
==== Bracket ====
Quarterfinals
(#1 twice-to-beat)
1	San Miguel	95	110
8	Terrafirma	106	91
(Best-of-3)
4	TNT	1
5	Rain or Shine	2
(#2 twice-to-beat)
2	Barangay Ginebra	99
7	Magnolia	77
(Best-of-3)
3	Meralco	2
6	NLEX	0

Semifinals (Best-of-7)
1	San Miguel	4
5	Rain or Shine	0
2	Barangay Ginebra	3
3	Meralco	4

Finals (Best-of-7)
1	San Miguel	2
3	Meralco	4

==== Game log ====
2024 PBA Philippine Cup playoffs game log
Total: 10–5
Quarterfinals: 2–0

Game	Date	Opponent	Score	High points	High rebounds	High assists	Location Attendance	Series
1	May 8	NLEX	W 97–93	Allein Maliksi (22)	Hodge, Newsome (7)	Chris Newsome (6)	Smart Araneta Coliseum	1–0
2	May 10	NLEX	W 100–81	Chris Banchero (23)	Chris Newsome (9)	Chris Banchero (6)	Rizal Memorial Coliseum	2–0

Semifinals: 4–3

Game	Date	Opponent	Score	High points	High rebounds	High assists	Location Attendance	Series
1	May 17	Barangay Ginebra	L 88–92	Chris Newsome (21)	Chris Newsome (13)	Chris Banchero (8)	Mall of Asia Arena	0–1
2	May 19	Barangay Ginebra	W 103–91	Allein Maliksi (25)	Cliff Hodge (10)	Caram, Hodge, Newsome (3)	Mall of Asia Arena	1–1
3	May 22	Barangay Ginebra	W 87–80	Allein Maliksi (16)	Almazan, Bates (9)	Chris Newsome (6)	Dasmariñas Arena	2–1
4	May 24	Barangay Ginebra	L 71–90	Banchero, Maliksi (14)	Allein Maliksi (6)	Chris Banchero (3)	Mall of Asia Arena	2–2
5	May 26	Barangay Ginebra	L 84–89	Chris Banchero (18)	Cliff Hodge (8)	Chris Banchero (6)	Mall of Asia Arena	2–3
6	May 29	Barangay Ginebra	W 86–81	Bong Quinto (23)	Raymond Almazan (11)	Chris Banchero (8)	Smart Araneta Coliseum	3–3
7	May 31	Barangay Ginebra	W 78–69	Chris Banchero (24)	Brandon Bates (13)	Chris Newsome (6)	FPJ Arena	4–3

Finals: 4–2

Game	Date	Opponent	Score	High points	High rebounds	High assists	Location Attendance	Series
1	June 5	San Miguel	W 93–86	Banchero, Newsome (18)	Cliff Hodge (15)	Banchero, Newsome (5)	Smart Araneta Coliseum	1–0
2	June 7	San Miguel	L 94–95	Cliff Hodge (25)	Bates, Hodge (9)	Chris Newsome (5)	Smart Araneta Coliseum	1–1
3	June 9	San Miguel	W 93–89	Chris Newsome (26)	Almazan, Hodge (13)	Chris Banchero (6)	Smart Araneta Coliseum	2–1
4	June 12	San Miguel	L 101–111	Chris Newsome (40)	Cliff Hodge (10)	Chris Newsome (4)	Smart Araneta Coliseum	2–2
5	June 14	San Miguel	W 92–88	Maliksi, Newsome (22)	Cliff Hodge (9)	Chris Newsome (5)	Smart Araneta Coliseum	3–2
6	June 16	San Miguel	W 80–78	Chris Newsome (15)	Raymond Almazan (10)	Chris Banchero (8)	Smart Araneta Coliseum	4–2

== East Asia Super League ==
=== Group stage ===
==== Standings ====
Pos	Team	Pld	W	L	PF	PA	PD	Qualification
1	(South Korea) Seoul SK Knights	6	4 (Note: Seoul SK Knights 161–147 New Taipei Kings)	2	475	438	+37	Semifinals
2	(Chinese Taipei) New Taipei Kings	6	4	2	467	483	−16	Semifinals
3	(Japan) Ryukyu Golden Kings	6	3	3	479	453	+26	
4	(Philippines) Meralco Bolts	6	1	5	469	516	−47	

Source: EASL

==== Game log ====
15 November 2023	Ryukyu Golden Kings (Japan)	89–61	(Philippines) Meralco Bolts	Okinawa
19:00 (JST)	Scoring by quarter: 17–21, 31–13, 21–13, 20–14
	Pts: Imamura 19; Rebs: Durham 9 Asts: Durham 6	Boxscore	Pts: Newsome 11; Rebs: Ibeh 9 Asts: Caram 4	Arena: Okinawa Arena; Attendance: 6,120

29 November 2023	New Taipei Kings (Chinese Taipei)	97–92	(Philippines) Meralco Bolts	New Taipei City
19:00 (TST)	Scoring by quarter: 25–30, 20–18, 20–18, 32–26
	Pts: Je. Lin 25; Rebs: Anigwe 14; Asts: Je. Lin 7	Boxscore	Pts: Lofton 35; Rebs: Ibeh, Newsome 6 Asts: Newsome 4	Arena: Xinzhuang Gymnasium

13 December 2023	Meralco Bolts (Philippines)	97–88(OT)	(Japan) Ryukyu Golden Kings	Macau, China
19:00 (CST)	Scoring by quarter: 17–21, 21–16, 19–20, 23–23, Overtime: 17–8
	Pts: Lofton 35; Rebs: Ibeh 12; Asts: three players 3	Boxscore	Pts: Law 27; Rebs: Cooley 13; Asts: Law 6	Arena: Studio City Event Center

27 December 2023	Meralco Bolts (Philippines)	80–81	(South Korea) Seoul SK Knights	Pasig
19:00 (PST)	Scoring by quarter: 20–20, 13–25, 23–19, 24–17
	Pts: Lofton 32; Rebs: Ibeh 11; Asts: Newsome 6	Boxscore	Pts: Warney 31; Rebs: Williams 8 Asts: Warney 6	Arena: PhilSports Arena

3 January 2024	Meralco Bolts (Philippines)	77–89	(Chinese Taipei) New Taipei Kings	Pasig
19:00 (PST)	Scoring by quarter: 21–21, 26–21, 11–24, 77–89
	Pts: Lofton 20; Rebs: Ibeh 7 Asts: Lofton 4	Boxscore	Pts: Je. Lin 23; Rebs: Anigwe, Je. Lin 10; Asts: Je. Lin, Manigault 4	Arena: PhilSports Arena

7 February 2024	Seoul SK Knights (South Korea)	72–62	(Philippines) Meralco Bolts	Seoul
19:00 (KST)	Scoring by quarter: 14–13, 18–17, 17–18, 23–14
	Pts: Williams 25; Rebs: Williams 19; Asts: Choi W. 14	Boxscore	Pts: Miller 23; Rebs: Tew 21; Asts: three players 3	Arena: Jamsil Students' Gymnasium

== Transactions ==
=== Subtractions ===
Player	Number	Position	Reason	New team
Nonoy Baclao	50, 97	Center / Power forward	End of contract	San Miguel Beermen

=== Trades ===
==== Pre-season ====
May
May 18, 2023	To Meralco Norbert Torres	To Rain or Shine Mac Belo

=== Recruited imports ===
Tournament	Name	Debuted	Last game	Record
Commissioner's Cup	Suleiman Braimoh	November 8, 2023 (vs. Rain or Shine)	December 3, 2023 (vs. NLEX)	4–1
Commissioner's Cup	Zach Lofton	December 10, 2023 (vs. NorthPort)	December 22, 2023 (vs. Barangay Ginebra)	2–1
Commissioner's Cup	Shonn Miller	January 6, 2024 (vs. Magnolia)	January 21, 2024 (vs. Phoenix Super LPG)	3–2

== Awards ==
Recipient	Award	Date awarded
Chris Newsome	2024 PBA Philippine Cup Finals Most Valuable Player	June 16, 2024
Honors
Chris Newsome	2023–24 PBA Mythical First Team	August 18, 2024
Chris Newsome	2023–24 PBA All-Defensive Team	August 18, 2024
Cliff Hodge	2023–24 PBA Mythical Second Team	August 18, 2024
Cliff Hodge	2023–24 PBA All-Defensive Team	August 18, 2024
