= Aaron Black (basketball) =

Filipino-American basketball player (born 1996)

No. 1 – Meralco Bolts
- Position: Point guard / shooting guard
- League: PBA

Personal information
- Born: December 3, 1996 (age 29) Philippines
- Listed height: 6 ft 1 in (1.85 m)
- Listed weight: 180 lb (82 kg)

Career information
- High school: Ateneo (Quezon City)
- College: Ateneo
- PBA draft: 2019: 2nd round18th overall (Note: The 2019 draft was composed of two drafts: the Gilas special draft, which consists of 5 players reserved for the Gilas Pilipinas program, and the regular draft. Black was selected as the eighteenth pick of the regular draft.)
- Drafted by: Meralco Bolts
- Playing career: 2019–present

Career history
- 2019: Quezon City Capitals
- 2019–2020: Zamboanga Family's Brand Sardines
- 2020–present: Meralco Bolts

Career highlights
- PBA champion (2024 Philippine); PBA Outstanding Rookie (2020); PBA All-Rookie Team (2020); 2× UAAP champion (2017, 2018)

Norman Aaron Black (born December 3, 1996) is a Filipino-American professional basketball player for the Meralco Bolts of the Philippine Basketball Association (PBA). He won the PBA Outstanding Rookie award in 2021. He is the son of former PBA Best Import Norman Black, who is also the former head coach of Meralco.

== College career ==
After playing in high school for the Ateneo Blue Eaglets, Black committed to the senior team of Ateneo. He didn't play that season as he was a team captain for the Philippine team in the 2014 FIBA Asia U-18 Championship.

He made his college debut the next season, scoring 11 points in a win over the Adamson Soaring Falcons. He scored 13 points in 13 minutes to extend Ateneo's win streak to five against the De La Salle Green Archers. His team lost in the semis that season to the FEU Tamaraws.

With Season 78 MVP Kiefer Ravena graduating, Black transitioned from role player to one of the Eagles' top players. In their first game of Season 79, he had a game-high 23 points and a win against the UST Growling Tigers. In a game against FEU, he injured his left foot, causing him to sit out for three weeks. He returned in a win against the UE Red Warriors. He scored 16 points to help Ateneo prevent La Salle from sweeping the elimination round. For that performance, he was named Player of the Week. They lost in the Finals to La Salle.

In Seasons 80 and 81, Black saw his stats dip under Coach Tab Baldwin, but was still a reliable contributor as Ateneo won back-to-back titles. He forwent his final playing year.

== Professional career ==
=== Quezon City Capitals (2019) ===
After playing for Ateneo, he next played for the Quezon City Capitals in the Maharlika Pilipinas Basketball League. He tallied 17 points, 11 rebounds, and 10 assists for a triple-double in a win against the Binan City Laguna Heroes. Black averaged 11.8 points, 7.4 rebounds, and 5.4 assists in the 14 games that he played for Quezon City.

=== AMA Online Education Titans (2019) ===
In 2019, Black played for the AMA Online Education Titans in the semi-professional PBA D-League Foundation Cup. He had 25 points, 15 rebounds, and 11 assists in his debut. In their first win, he registered 26 points, 16 rebounds, and 14 assists, becoming only the third player in that league's history to rack up multiple triple-doubles after Mike Tolomia (twice) and Jeron Teng (thrice). He cooled down slightly as AMA lost to Marinerong Pilipino, with only 12 points, 10 rebounds, and 6 assists. He had another triple-double with 45 points, 18 assists, and 12 rebounds as AMA qualified for the quarterfinals. He closed his D-League stint with 22 points as Marinerong Pilipino eliminated them.

=== Zamboanga Family's Brand Sardines (2019–2020) ===
Black was traded to the Zamboanga Family's Brand Sardines where he became teammates with future Meralco teammate Alvin Pasaol.

=== Meralco Bolts (2020–present) ===
==== 2020 season: Rookie season ====
In the 2019 PBA Draft, Black was drafted 18th overall by the Meralco Bolts, who are coached by his father, Norman Black. He became only the third PBA player to be coached by his father as a head coach after Dodot Jaworski with Robert Jaworski and Marc Agustin with Ato Agustin. In the Bolts' first win, he produced 8 points, 2 rebounds and 2 assists, which was better than his losing debut of 6 points, 3 assists, and 2 turnovers. He contributed 16 points on 6-of-10 shooting, 4 rebounds, 4 assists, and a steal in an overtime win against the Magnolia Hotshots. He copped a Rookie of the Week honor as Meralco started the year 3–1. They finished 7–4, qualifying for the playoffs as a 5th seed and playing against the San Miguel Beermen. In Game 1, he dropped 11 of his 14 points in the fourth quarter as Meralco defeated San Miguel, 78–71, and forced a rubber match for a semis seat. This performance gave him another Rookie of the Week award. They clinched a spot in the semifinals with a dominating 90–68 win. In the semis, they lost in 5 games to the Barangay Ginebra San Miguel, with Scottie Thompson preventing Meralco from going to the Finals. He finished the season by winning the Rookie of the Year Award, becoming the lowest draft pick to do so. He was also named to the All-Rookie Team.

==== 2021 season: First Finals appearance ====
In a 2021 Philippine Cup win against the Beermen, Black scored 14 points. He injured his hand during a game against the Terrafirma Dyip. He was cleared to return nearly a month later during the playoffs. Meralco got to the semifinals in that conference, where they were eliminated by Magnolia. In a 2021 Governors' Cup win over the NLEX Road Warriors, he scored 19 points. They faced Magnolia once again in the semis where in Game 1, he had 14 points, six rebounds, and four assists to contribute in the win. In Game 5, he stepped up for the injured Chris Banchero with 16 points as they got past Magnolia and reached the Finals against Ginebra. In his Finals debut, he scored 12 points as Meralco won first. He then followed it up with 24 points, but Ginebra took the win to even the series 1–1. In Game 5, he got a season-high 25 points, but Ginebra won that game and the next, making them the Governors' Cup champions.

==== 2022–23 season ====
On May 24, 2022, Black signed a two-year extension with the team. To start the 2022–23 season, he scored 19 points in a win over the Phoenix Super LPG Fuel Masters. He then followed it up by tying his career-high of 25 points in a win over the Converge FiberXers. He missed the next game due to a wrist sprain. Against the NorthPort Batang Pier, he made his return and put up 20 points, five rebounds, and seven assists to lead Meralco to the win. In a win over the Rain or Shine Elasto Painters, he scored 20 points including a clutch triple with 35.6 seconds left. They ended the 2022 Philippine Cup with a record of 7–4, good for the fifth seed. In Game 1 of their quarterfinals series against Ginebra, he led the way with 25 points as they won. With a win the following game, Meralco was finally able to get past Ginebra in a series. In Game 4 of their semis against the Beermen, he led with 21 points, seven rebounds, and seven assists to tie the series. Then in Game 6, he scored 11 of his 17 points in the fourth quarter and also grabbed five rebounds and six assists to force a do-or-die game. However, they lost Game 7, and were eliminated from title contention.

Meralco then started the Commissioner's Cup with back-to-back losses, but finally got their first win of the conference against Terrafirma in which he had 17 points. In a game against Rain or Shine, Black was accidentally elbowed in the nose by Rey Nambatac and had to be taken to the hospital. In a win over the TNT Tropang Giga, he had a double-double of 17 points and 11 rebounds, along with six assists, a steal, and a block. Meralco didn't qualify for the playoffs that conference.

Black missed some games during the Governors' Cup due to a knee injury. In a win over the Blackwater Bossing, he contributed 19 points, three rebounds, and seven assists. He then had 21 points and eight rebounds in a loss to TNT. In a win over Converge, he had 26 points alongside eight boards and five assists. During the PBA All-Star Week, he participated in the Three-Point shootout and the Greats vs Stalwarts game. In the quarterfinals against Magnolia, he scored 16 points, and made a buzzer-beating shot that sent the game into overtime, where Meralco was able to pull out the 113–107 win. In Game 2 of their semis against TNT, he led Meralco to the win with career-highs of 28 points and 10 assists. TNT eventually eliminated Meralco in that series.

== PBA career statistics ==
Legend
GP	Games played	MPG	Minutes per game	FG%	Field-goal percentage
3FG%	3-point field-goal percentage	4P%	4-point field-goal percentage	FT%	Free-throw percentage
RPG	Rebounds per game	APG	Assists per game	SPG	Steals per game
BPG	Blocks per game	PPG	Points per game	127	Career high

As of the end of 2025–26 season

=== Season-by-season averages ===
Year	Team	GP	MPG	FG%	3P%	4P%	FT%	RPG	APG	SPG	BPG	PPG
2020	Meralco	18	17.8	.389	.347	—	.692	3.7	1.7	.3	—	6.6
2021	Meralco	31	23.7	.398	.271	—	.641	3.5	2.1	.4	.2	8.5
2022–23	Meralco	47	33.3	.430	.369	—	.660	5.7	4.4	.4	.2	14.6
2023–24	Meralco	19	26.4	.360	.397	—	.667	5.3	3.2	.8	.2	9.6
2024–25	Meralco	27	22.7	.433	.293	.000	.468	4.3	3.1	.2	.2	8.1
2025–26	Meralco	46	17.8	.389	.292	.000	.608	3.1	2.3	.3	—	6.2
Career		188	24.2	.408	.332	.000	.626	4.3	2.9	.4	.1	9.3

== National team career ==
Black was a team captain for the Philippine team in the 2014 FIBA Asia U-18 Championship. He also played for Mighty Sports in the 2019 William Jones Cup. In 2023, he was part of the training pool for that year's SEA Games.

== Personal life ==
Black's father Norman is also a former coach of the Ateneo Blue Eagles. His older sister Dominique is a lawyer who works for a Canadian company in London. He has a girlfriend, Alexandrea Enciso.
