= 2024–25 Meralco Bolts season =

- Head coach: Luigi Trillo
- General manager: Paolo Trillo
- Owners: Manila Electric Company (an MVP Group subsidiary)

Governors' Cup results
- Record: 7–3 (70%)
- Place: 2nd in Group A
- Playoff finish: Quarterfinalist (lost to Barangay Ginebra, 0–3)

Commissioner's Cup results
- Record: 7–5 (58.3%)
- Place: 5th
- Playoff finish: Quarterfinalist (lost to Barangay Ginebra, 1–2)

Philippine Cup results
- Record: 6–5 (54.5%)
- Place: 8th
- Playoff finish: Quarterfinalist (lost to San Miguel with twice-to-win disadvantage)

Meralco Bolts seasons

The 2024–25 Meralco Bolts season was the 14th season of the franchise in the Philippine Basketball Association (PBA).

== Key dates ==
- July 14: The PBA season 49 draft was held at the Glorietta Activity Center in Makati.

== Draft picks ==
Round	Pick	Player	Position	Place of birth	College
1	11	CJ Cansino	G	Philippines	UP
2	23	Kurt Reyson	G	Philippines	Letran
3	35	JP Maguliano	F	Philippines	EAC
4	43	Jordan Bartlett	G	USA	De La Salle

== Roster ==
2024–25 Meralco Bolts roster
Players
Coaches

Pos.	#	POB	Name	Height	Weight	DOB (YYYY–MM–DD)	From
G	1	(Philippines)	Aaron Black	6 ft 1 in (1.85 m)	180 lb (82 kg)	1996–12–03	Ateneo
G	6	(United States)	Chris Banchero	6 ft 1 in (1.85 m)	175 lb (79 kg)	1989–01–24	Seattle Pacific
F	7	(United States)	Cliff Hodge	6 ft 4 in (1.93 m)	195 lb (88 kg)	1988–02–03	Hawaii Pacific
G	8	(Philippines)	Kurt Reyson (injured) (R)	5 ft 10 in (1.78 m)		1998–09–08	Letran
G	10	(Philippines)	Jolo Mendoza	5 ft 10 in (1.78 m)		1998–01–31	Ateneo
G/F	11	(United States)	Chris Newsome (C)	6 ft 2 in (1.88 m)	190 lb (86 kg)	1990–07–25	Ateneo
F	12	(Philippines)	JP Maguliano (R / FA)	6 ft 4 in (1.93 m)			Emilio Aguinaldo
G	17	(Philippines)	Anjo Caram	5 ft 7 in (1.70 m)	159 lb (72 kg)	1991–01–14	San Beda
F	19	(Philippines)	Bong Quinto	6 ft 2 in (1.88 m)		1994–12–15	Letran
C	20	(Philippines)	Raymond Almazan	6 ft 8 in (2.03 m)	194 lb (88 kg)	1989–08–02	Letran
F	22	(Philippines)	Allein Maliksi (injured)	6 ft 4 in (1.93 m)	180 lb (82 kg)	1987–09–18	UST
F	23	(Philippines)	Alvin Pasaol	6 ft 2 in (1.88 m)	200 lb (91 kg)	1995–05–06	UE
F	24	(Philippines)	Raymar Jose	6 ft 4 in (1.93 m)	210 lb (95 kg)	1992–08–06	Far Eastern
F	27	(Philippines)	Jansen Rios	6 ft 3 in (1.91 m)	185 lb (84 kg)	1991–10–28	Adamson
F/C	29	(Canada)	Norbert Torres	6 ft 6 in (1.98 m)	250 lb (113 kg)	1990–01–12	De La Salle
F/C	32	(United States)	Kyle Pascual	6 ft 6 in (1.98 m)	210 lb (95 kg)	1990–04–13	San Beda
C	33	(Australia)	Brandon Bates	6 ft 8 in (2.03 m)	231 lb (105 kg)	1997–08–12	De La Salle
G	71	(Philippines)	CJ Cansino (R)	6 ft 2 in (1.88 m)		1999–10–27	Philippines

Head coach

- (Philippines) Luigi Trillo

Assistant coach(es)

- (Philippines) Gene Afable (1st assistant)
- (Philippines) Reynel Hugnatan
- (Philippines) Sandro Soriano
- (Serbia) Nenad Vučinić (active consultant)
- (United States) Norman Black (consultant)

Team manager

- (Philippines) Paolo Trillo

Legend

- (C) Team captain
- (CI) Commissioner's Cup Import
- (GI) Governors' Cup Import
- (EI) EASL Import
- (DP) Unsigned draft pick
- (FA) Free agent
- (IN) Inactive
- (S) Suspended
- (R) Rookie
- Injured

Roster

== Governors' Cup ==
=== Eliminations ===
==== Group A Standings ====
Pos	Team	W	L	PCT	GB	Qualification
1	TNT Tropang Giga	8	2	.800	—	Quarterfinals
2	Meralco Bolts	7	3	.700	1	Quarterfinals
3	Converge FiberXers	6	4	.600	2	Quarterfinals
4	Magnolia Chicken Timplados Hotshots	5	5	.500	3	Quarterfinals
5	NorthPort Batang Pier	3	7	.300	5	
6	Terrafirma Dyip	1	9	.100	7	

Source: PBA.ph
Rules for classification: 1) winning percentage; 2) if two teams are tied, head-to-head record, if three or more teams are tied, head-to-head goal average (quotient); 3) overall quotient; 4) coin toss

==== Game log ====
2024 PBA Governors' Cup game log
Total: 7–3
August: 2–1

Game	Date	Opponent	Score	High points	High rebounds	High assists	Location Attendance	Record
1	August 18	Magnolia	W 99–94	Allen Durham (20)	Allen Durham (16)	Cliff Hodge (5)	Smart Araneta Coliseum	1–0
2	August 22	TNT	L 73–93	Chris Banchero (18)	Allen Durham (10)	Banchero, Quinto (4)	Smart Araneta Coliseum	1–1
3	August 28	Terrafirma	W 107–91	Allen Durham (23)	Allen Durham (12)	Cliff Hodge (7)	Ninoy Aquino Stadium	2–1

September: 5–2

Game	Date	Opponent	Score	High points	High rebounds	High assists	Location Attendance	Record
4	September 1	NorthPort	W 109–99	Allen Durham (34)	Allen Durham (16)	Allen Durham (9)	Ninoy Aquino Stadium	3–1
5	September 4	Converge	W 116–88	Allen Durham (27)	Allen Durham (14)	Allen Durham (6)	Smart Araneta Coliseum	4–1
6	September 7	Magnolia	W 82–74	Chris Newsome (21)	Allen Durham (14)	Chris Banchero (6)	Panabo City Multi-Purpose Tourism Cultural and Sports Center	5–1
7	September 12	TNT	L 99–108	Allen Durham (26)	Allen Durham (11)	Allen Durham (6)	Ninoy Aquino Stadium	5–2
8	September 14	NorthPort	W 114–104	Allen Durham (23)	Allen Durham (13)	Bong Quinto (6)	Ninoy Aquino Stadium	6–2
9	September 18	Converge	L 97–105	Allen Durham (25)	Chris Newsome (11)	Bong Quinto (8)	Ninoy Aquino Stadium	6–3
10	September 21	Terrafirma	W 124–82	Alvin Pasaol (21)	Hodge, Pasaol (8)	Jolo Mendoza (5)	Ninoy Aquino Stadium	7–3

=== Playoffs ===
==== Bracket ====
Quarterfinals (Best-of-5)
A1	TNT	3
B4	NLEX	1
B1	Rain or Shine	3
A4	Magnolia	2
B2	San Miguel	3
A3	Converge	2
A2	Meralco	0
B3	Barangay Ginebra	3

Semifinals (Best-of-7)
A1	TNT	4
B1	Rain or Shine	1
B2	San Miguel	2
B3	Barangay Ginebra	4

Finals (Best-of-7)
A1	TNT	4
B3	Barangay Ginebra	2

==== Game log ====
2024 PBA Governors' Cup playoffs game log
Total: 0–3
Quarterfinals: 0–3

Game	Date	Opponent	Score	High points	High rebounds	High assists	Location Attendance	Series
1	September 26	Barangay Ginebra	L 92–99	Cliff Hodge (23)	Allen Durham (13)	Chris Newsome (6)	Ninoy Aquino Stadium	0–1
2	September 28	Barangay Ginebra	L 103–104	Allen Durham (39)	Allen Durham (14)	Banchero, Hodge (7)	Smart Araneta Coliseum	0–2
3	September 30	Barangay Ginebra	L 106–113	Allen Durham (38)	Allen Durham (13)	Chris Banchero (8)	Ninoy Aquino Stadium	0–3

== Commissioner's Cup ==
=== Eliminations ===
==== Standings ====
Pos	Team	W	L	PCT	GB	Qualification
1	NorthPort Batang Pier	9	3	.750	—	Twice-to-beat in the quarterfinals
2	TNT Tropang Giga	8	4	.667 (Note: Head-to-head quotient: TNT 1.04, Converge 1.03, Barangay Ginebra 0.94)	1	Twice-to-beat in the quarterfinals
3	Converge FiberXers	8	4	.667	1	Best-of-three quarterfinals
4	Barangay Ginebra San Miguel	8	4	.667	1	Best-of-three quarterfinals
5	Meralco Bolts	7	5	.583 (Note: Head-to-head quotient: Meralco 1.08, Rain or Shine 1.04, Eastern 0.88)	2	Best-of-three quarterfinals
6	Rain or Shine Elasto Painters	7	5	.583	2	Best-of-three quarterfinals
7	Eastern (G)	7	5	.583	2	Twice-to-win in the quarterfinals
8	Magnolia Chicken Timplados Hotshots	6	6	.500 (Note: Eighth seed playoff: Magnolia 112–81 NLEX)	3	Twice-to-win in the quarterfinals
9	NLEX Road Warriors	6	6	.500	3	
10	San Miguel Beermen	5	7	.417	4	
11	Blackwater Bossing	3	9	.250 (Note: Head-to-head record: Blackwater 1–0 Phoenix)	6	
12	Phoenix Fuel Masters	3	9	.250	6	
13	Terrafirma Dyip	1	11	.083	8	

Source: PBA.ph
Rules for classification: 1) winning percentage; 2) if two teams are tied, head-to-head record; if three or more teams are tied, head-to-head goal average (quotient); if tied for 8th, one-game playoff; 3) overall quotient; 4) coin toss
(G) Guests

==== Game log ====
2024–25 PBA Commissioner's Cup game log
Total: 7–5
November: 1–0

Game	Date	Opponent	Score	High points	High rebounds	High assists	Location Attendance	Record
1	November 29, 2024	Phoenix	W 111–109	Akil Mitchell (27)	Akil Mitchell (13)	Chris Newsome (6)	Ninoy Aquino Stadium	1–0

December: 2–2

Game	Date	Opponent	Score	High points	High rebounds	High assists	Location Attendance	Record
2	December 1, 2024	Rain or Shine	W 121–111	Chris Newsome (25)	Raymond Almazan (16)	Black, Quinto (4)	Ynares Center	2–0
3	December 6, 2024	Terrafirma	W 96–91	D. J. Kennedy (32)	Raymond Almazan (12)	Chris Newsome (8)	Ninoy Aquino Stadium	3–0
4	December 12, 2024	Blackwater	L 98–114	Chris Newsome (22)	Cliff Hodge (10)	Aaron Black (6)	Ninoy Aquino Stadium	3–1
5	December 25, 2024	Converge	L 94–110	Akil Mitchell (29)	Akil Mitchell (18)	Bong Quinto (4)	Smart Araneta Coliseum; 12,198	3–2

January: 4–3

Game	Date	Opponent	Score	High points	High rebounds	High assists	Location Attendance	Record
6	January 5, 2025	Eastern	W 88–83	Akil Mitchell (31)	Akil Mitchell (14)	Akil Mitchell (5)	Smart Araneta Coliseum	4–2
7	January 7, 2025	TNT	L 99–101	Akil Mitchell (24)	Akil Mitchell (18)	Chris Newsome (8)	PhilSports Arena	4–3
8	January 10, 2025	NLEX	W 105–91	Akil Mitchell (24)	Akil Mitchell (12)	Mitchell, Quinto (6)	Ninoy Aquino Stadium	5–3
9	January 14, 2025	NorthPort	W 111–94	Akil Mitchell (30)	Akil Mitchell (13)	Chris Banchero (6)	Ninoy Aquino Stadium	6–3
10	January 18, 2025	San Miguel	W 100–93	Akil Mitchell (26)	Akil Mitchell (16)	Bong Quinto (8)	Candon City Arena	7–3
11	January 29, 2025	Barangay Ginebra	L 87–91	CJ Cansino (15)	Raymond Almazan (13)	Banchero, Black, Hodge (4)	Smart Araneta Coliseum	7–4
12	January 31, 2025	Magnolia	L 92–129	Raymond Almazan (23)	Brandon Bates (5)	Chris Banchero (8)	PhilSports Arena	7–5

=== Playoffs ===
==== Bracket ====
Quarterfinals
(#1 twice-to-beat)
1	NorthPort	113
8	Magnolia	110
(Best-of-3)
4	Barangay Ginebra	2
5	Meralco	1
(#2 twice-to-beat)
2	TNT	109
7	Eastern	93
(Best-of-3)
3	Converge	1
6	Rain or Shine	2

Semifinals (Best-of-7)
1	NorthPort	1
4	Barangay Ginebra	4
2	TNT	4
6	Rain or Shine	1

Finals (Best-of-7)
4	Barangay Ginebra	3
2	TNT	4

==== Game log ====
2024–25 PBA Commissioner's Cup playoffs game log
Total: 1–2
Quarterfinals: 1–2

Game	Date	Opponent	Score	High points	High rebounds	High assists	Location Attendance	Series
1	February 5, 2025	Barangay Ginebra	L 92–100	Chris Newsome (20)	Akil Mitchell (14)	Akil Mitchell (6)	Smart Araneta Coliseum	0–1
2	February 7, 2025	Barangay Ginebra	W 108–104	Chris Newsome (24)	Akil Mitchell (17)	Akil Mitchell (10)	Ninoy Aquino Stadium	1–1
3	February 9, 2025	Barangay Ginebra	L 87–94	Chris Newsome (22)	Akil Mitchell (12)	Banchero, Mitchell, Quinto (3)	Ynares Center	1–2

== Philippine Cup ==
=== Eliminations ===
==== Standings ====
Pos	Team	W	L	PCT	GB	Qualification
1	San Miguel Beermen	8	3	.727 (Note: Head-to-head quotient: San Miguel 1.06, NLEX 1.01, Magnolia 0.97, Barangay Ginebra 0.96)	—	Twice-to-beat in the quarterfinals
2	NLEX Road Warriors	8	3	.727	—	Twice-to-beat in the quarterfinals
3	Magnolia Chicken Timplados Hotshots	8	3	.727	—	Twice-to-beat in the quarterfinals
4	Barangay Ginebra San Miguel	8	3	.727	—	Twice-to-beat in the quarterfinals
5	Converge FiberXers	7	4	.636	1	Twice-to-win in the quarterfinals
6	TNT Tropang 5G	6	5	.545 (Note: Head-to-head quotient: TNT 1.13, Rain or Shine 1.02, Meralco 0.87)	2	Twice-to-win in the quarterfinals
7	Rain or Shine Elasto Painters	6	5	.545	2	Twice-to-win in the quarterfinals
8	Meralco Bolts	6	5	.545	2	Twice-to-win in the quarterfinals
9	Phoenix Fuel Masters	4	7	.364	4	
10	Blackwater Bossing	2	9	.182 (Note: Head-to-head record: Blackwater 1–0 NorthPort)	6	
11	NorthPort Batang Pier	2	9	.182	6	
12	Terrafirma Dyip	1	10	.091	7	

Source: PBA.ph
Rules for classification: 1) winning percentage; 2) if two teams are tied, head-to-head record; if three or more teams are tied, head-to-head goal average (quotient); if tied for 8th, one-game playoff; 3) overall quotient; 4) coin toss

==== Game log ====
2025 PBA Philippine Cup game log
Total: 6–5
April: 2–3

Game	Date	Opponent	Score	High points	High rebounds	High assists	Location Attendance	Record
1	April 4	Converge	W 91–89	Chris Newsome (15)	Raymond Almazan (12)	Black, Newsome (4)	Ninoy Aquino Stadium	1–0
2	April 6	Terrafirma	W 118–80	CJ Cansino (19)	Brandon Bates (8)	Bong Quinto (5)	Ninoy Aquino Stadium	2–0
3	April 9	San Miguel	L 98–110	Chris Newsome (27)	Black, Hodge (7)	Chris Newsome (7)	Rizal Memorial Coliseum	2–1
4	April 13	Phoenix	L 97–109	Chris Newsome (18)	Raymar Jose (17)	Aaron Black (9)	Ninoy Aquino Stadium	2–2
5	April 27	Rain or Shine	L 116–128	Bong Quinto (23)	Bates, Cansino, Hodge, Jose (6)	Chris Newsome (7)	Ynares Center	2–3

May: 4–2

Game	Date	Opponent	Score	High points	High rebounds	High assists	Location Attendance	Record
6	May 9	NorthPort	W 105–104	Chris Newsome (24)	Cliff Hodge (14)	Cliff Hodge (5)	PhilSports Arena	3–3
7	May 11	TNT	L 84–101	Cliff Hodge (23)	Raymond Almazan (8)	Newsome, Quinto (3)	Ninoy Aquino Stadium	3–4
8	May 14	Magnolia	L 92–117	Chris Banchero (20)	Brandon Bates (6)	Chris Newsome (4)	Ninoy Aquino Stadium	3–5
9	May 21	Blackwater	W 103–85	Chris Newsome (19)	Alvin Pasaol (8)	Aaron Black (6)	Ynares Center	4–5
10	May 25	NLEX	W 108–92	Chris Newsome (21)	Brandon Bates (8)	Chris Banchero (6)	PhilSports Arena	5–5
11	May 30	Barangay Ginebra	W 82–73	Chris Newsome (15)	Brandon Bates (9)	Banchero, Quinto (3)	Smart Araneta Coliseum	6–5

=== Playoffs ===
==== Bracket ====
Quarterfinals (Top 4 twice-to-beat)
1	San Miguel	108
8	Meralco	97
4	Barangay Ginebra	88
5	Converge	80
2	NLEX	89	92
7	Rain or Shine	92	103
3	Magnolia	88	79
6	TNT	89	80

Semifinals (Best-of-7)
1	San Miguel	4
4	Barangay Ginebra	3
7	Rain or Shine	2
6	TNT	4

Finals (Best-of-7)
1	San Miguel	4
6	TNT	2

==== Game log ====
2025 PBA Philippine Cup playoffs game log
Total: 0–1
Quarterfinals: 0–1

Game	Date	Opponent	Score	High points	High rebounds	High assists	Location Attendance	Series
1	June 20	San Miguel	L 97–108	Chris Banchero (32)	Chris Newsome (11)	Chris Newsome (6)	Ninoy Aquino Stadium	0–1

== East Asia Super League ==
=== Group stage ===
==== Standings ====
Pos	Team	Pld	W	L	PF	PA	PD	PCT	Qualification
1	(Japan) Ryukyu Golden Kings	6	5	1	498	493	+5	.833	Advance to semifinals
2	(Chinese Taipei) New Taipei Kings	6	4	2	594	532	+62	.667	Advance to semifinals
3	Macau Black Bears	6	3	3	582	579	+3	.500	
4	(Philippines) Meralco Bolts	6	2	4	487	509	−22	.333	
5	(South Korea) Busan KCC Egis	6	1	5	496	544	−48	.167	

Source: EASL

==== Game log ====
2 October 2024	Meralco Bolts (Philippines)	97–85	Macau Black Bears	Pasay
20:10 (PST)	Scoring by quarter: 24–17, 19–22, 30–25, 24–21
	Pts: Newsome 18; Rebs: Durham 11; Asts: Kennedy 7	Boxscore	Pts: Artino, Cylla 23; Rebs: Artino 14; Asts: Chong Qui 4	Arena: Mall of Asia Arena

16 October 2024	Ryukyu Golden Kings (Japan)	77–74	(Philippines) Meralco Bolts	Okinawa
19:40 (JST)	Scoring by quarter: 23–18, 28–17, 15–22, 11–17
	Pts: Cooley, Law 18; Rebs: Law 12; Asts: Kishimoto, Law 5	Boxscore	Pts: Kennedy 30; Rebs: Kennedy 12; Asts: Durham 5	Arena: Okinawa Arena; Attendance: 7,347

13 November 2024	Meralco Bolts (Philippines)	81–80	(South Korea) Busan KCC Egis	Pasig
20:10 (PST)	Scoring by quarter: 20–26, 22–27, 21–15, 18–12
	Pts: Mitchell 33; Rebs: Mitchell 22; Asts: Kennedy 5	Boxscore	Pts: Burton 26; Rebs: Williams 13; Asts: Burton 5	Arena: PhilSports Arena

18 December 2024	Busan KCC Egis (South Korea)	72–68	(Philippines) Meralco Bolts	Busan
19:10 (KST)	Scoring by quarter: 13–12, 18–19, 20–19, 21–18
	Pts: Heo 31; Rebs: Burton 14; Asts: Burton 5	Boxscore	Pts: Kennedy 23; Rebs: Mitchell 18; Asts: Newsome 4	Arena: Busan Sajik Gymnasium; Attendance: 1,644

22 January 2025	Meralco Bolts (Philippines)	71–89	(Japan) Ryukyu Golden Kings	Pasig
20:10 (PST)	Scoring by quarter: 22–23, 19–27, 15–25, 15–14
	Pts: Hodge, Kouame 13; Rebs: Hodge 7 Asts: Quinto 6	Boxscore	Pts: Law 20; Rebs: Law, Kirk 8 Asts: Law 5	Arena: PhilSports Arena

12 February 2025	New Taipei Kings (Chinese Taipei)	106–96(2OT)	(Philippines) Meralco Bolts	Taipei
19:10 (TST)	Scoring by quarter: 24–25, 18–19, 15–23, 21–11, Overtime: 13–13, 15–5
	Pts: Sakakini 31; Rebs: Manigault 14; Asts: Jo. Lin 7	Boxscore	Pts: Kennedy 21; Rebs: Mitchell 9 Asts: Mitchell 8	Arena: University of Taipei, Tian-Mu Campus Gymnasium

== Basketball Champions League Asia ==
=== Group stage ===
==== Standings ====
Pos	Team	Pld	W	L	PF	PA	PD	Pts	Qualification
1	(United Arab Emirates) Shabab Al Ahli	2	1	1	200	192	+8	3	Advance to Final phase
2	(Philippines) Meralco Bolts	2	1	1	184	187	−3	3	Advance to Final phase
3	(Japan) Utsunomiya Brex	2	1	1	191	196	−5	3	Advance to Final phase

Source: FIBA
Rules for classification: 1) Tournament points; 2) Head-to-head results; 3) Head-to-head points difference; 4) Head-to-head points scored; 5) Overall points difference 6) Overall points scored; 7) Random draw

==== Game log ====
7 June
18:00

Boxscore

Shabab Al Ahli (United Arab Emirates)	101–87	(Philippines) Meralco Bolts
Scoring by quarter: 35–27, 18–29, 26–18, 22–13
Pts: Washington 40; Rebs: Hawley 8 Asts: Washington 6		Pts: Watson, Varnado 19; Rebs: Egbunu 11; Asts: Banchero 4

Sheikh Saeed Bin Maktoum Sports Hall, Dubai
Attendance: 278
Referees: Yevgeniy Mikheyev (KAZ), Chan Owe Shiong (MAZ), Taha Al-Hashedi (YEM)

8 June
18:00

Boxscore

Meralco Bolts (Philippines)	97–86	(Japan) Utsunomiya Brex
Scoring by quarter: 20–18, 30–20, 27–27, 20–21
Pts: three players 17; Rebs: Egbunu 13; Asts: Varnado 6		Pts: Fotu 20; Rebs: Takeuchi 9 Asts: Newbill 8

Sheikh Saeed Bin Maktoum Sports Hall, Dubai
Attendance: 148
Referees: Wissam Zein (SYR), Taha Al-Hashedi (YEM), Ahmad Suleiman Alyousef (JOR)

=== Final phase ===
Quarterfinals
11 June
(Iran) Tabiat (2OT)	93
(Japan) Utsunomiya Brex	94
11 June
(Philippines) Meralco Bolts	78
(Mongolia) Ulaanbaatar Xac Broncos	83
11 June
(United Arab Emirates) Shabab Al Ahli	92
(Chinese Taipei) Taoyuan Pauian Pilots	88
11 June
(China) Zhejiang Lions	66
(Lebanon) Al Riyadi	102

Semifinals
12 June
(Japan) Utsunomiya Brex	93
(Mongolia) Ulaanbaatar Xac Broncos	71
12 June
(United Arab Emirates) Shabab Al Ahli	78
(Lebanon) Al Riyadi	100

Final
13 June
(Japan) Utsunomiya Brex	94
(Lebanon) Al Riyadi	93
Third place game
13 June
(Mongolia) Ulaanbaatar Xac Broncos	84
(United Arab Emirates) Shabab Al Ahli	79

==== Quarter-finals ====
11 June
15:00

Boxscore

Meralco Bolts (Philippines)	78–83	(Mongolia) Ulaanbaatar Xac Broncos
Scoring by quarter: 27–20, 15–20, 15–21, 21–22
Pts: Varnado 23; Rebs: Varnado 14; Asts: Watson 7		Pts: Miller 32; Rebs: Tshimanga 9 Asts: Miller 6

Coca-Cola Arena, Dubai
Referees: Wissam Zein (SYR), Mohammad Taha (JOR), Ahmad Suleiman Alyousef (JOR)

== Transactions ==
=== Free agency ===
==== Subtractions ====
Player	Number	Position	Reason	New team	Ref.
Diego Dario	4	Point guard	Moving to MPBL	Quezon Huskers (MPBL)	

=== Recruited imports ===
Tournament	Name	Debuted	Last game	Record	Ref.
Governors' Cup	Allen Durham	August 18, 2024 (vs. Magnolia)	September 30, 2024 (vs. Barangay Ginebra)	7–6	
Commissioner's Cup	Akil Mitchell	November 29, 2024 (vs. Phoenix)	February 9, 2025 (vs. Barangay Ginebra)	7–4	
Commissioner's Cup	D. J. Kennedy	December 6, 2024 (vs. Terrafirma)		1–0	
