= Cliff Hodge =

Filipino-American basketball player (born 1988)

No. 7 – Meralco Bolts
- Position: Power forward
- League: PBA

Personal information
- Born: February 3, 1988 (age 38) Pensacola, Florida, U.S.
- Listed height: 6 ft 4 in (1.93 m)
- Listed weight: 195 lb (88 kg)

Career information
- College: Reedley College (2006–2008); Hawaii Pacific (2008–2009)
- PBA draft: 2012: 1st round, 4th overall pick
- Drafted by: Meralco Bolts
- Playing career: 2012–present

Career history
- 2012–present: Meralco Bolts

Career highlights
- PBA champion (2024 Philippine); PBA All-Star (2024); 2× PBA Mythical Second Team (2017, 2024); PBA Defensive Player of the Year (2024); 3× PBA All-Defensive Team (2021, 2023, 2024)

Clifford Marion "Cliff" Hodge (born February 3, 1988) is a Filipino-American basketball player for the Meralco Bolts of the Philippine Basketball Association (PBA). He was selected 4th overall by the Meralco Bolts in the 2012 PBA draft.

== Semi-professional career ==
After his college career ended, Hodge met Geremy Robinson, a former PBA import who played for the Air21 Express. After Robinson found out he was half-Filipino, Robinson encouraged him to play in the Philippines.

In 2011, Hodge joined the NLEX Road Warriors in the PBA D-League. They won the inaugural league championship. NLEX then won the 2011 Aspirants' Cup. The following conference, he was named the Best Player of the 2012 Foundation Cup and made the Mythical Team. He and NLEX then went on to win its third straight championship that conference.

== Professional career ==
Hodge applied for the 2012 PBA Draft, where he was taken by the Meralco Bolts. In his debut against the Talk N' Text Tropang Texters, he had 19 points, 8 rebounds, 3 assists and 1 steal in 44 minutes. His first win came against the Alaska Aces, in which he scored 12 of his 20 points in the 3rd quarter. In their next game, he had 13 points, six rebounds, four assists, four blocks, and two steals as the Bolts claimed the win over Barangay Ginebra San Miguel. For those performances, he was named Player of the Week. He had 9 rebounds to go with 13 points in their rematch with the Aces. He finished the Philippine Cup with averages of 10.6 points, 7.4 rebounds and 1.1 blocks in 30 minutes of play. That season, he competed in the Slam Dunk Contest during the 2013 All-Star Weekend, losing to Chris Ellis. In the Governors' Cup, he had a then career-high 24 points and 13 rebounds against Air21 Express. He was also in the running for Rookie of the Year, but lost to Calvin Abueva.

In 2014, Hodge competed in that year's Slam Dunk Contest, but had the lowest score among all contestants. At the end of Game Two of their Commissioner's Cup quarterfinal series against the Rain or Shine Elasto Painters, Hodge committed a close-fisted foul against Raymond Almazan. For that foul, opposing coach Yeng Guiao used a racial slur on him. The league fined Guiao P100,000 and Hodge P20,000 for their actions. The Bolts lost Game 3 and were eliminated. In the Governors' Cup, he had one of his best conferences as he averaged 18.2 points, 9.6 rebounds, 1.2 steals and 1.3 blocks while attaining six double-doubles. However, Meralco failed to qualify for the playoffs for that conference.

In the 2016 Commissioner's Cup, Hodge had 25 points and 11 rebounds to prevent the Mahindra Enforcers from getting the win. In Game 4 of the Bolts' semifinals against TnT in the Governors' Cup, he had a career-high 32 points in 46 minutes, shooting 12-of-19 from the field. Along with his 4 rebounds, he also hit a three that guaranteed Meralco its first trip to the Finals. In the Finals, they lost to Ginebra in six games.

During the 2016–17 Philippine Cup, Hodge was penalized P20,000 after the flagrant foul he committed against Alex Cabagnot in the Bolts' match against the Beermen. He had 16 boards and 17 points against Rain or Shine to keep Meralco's playoff hopes alive. The Bolts missed out on the playoffs, winning only three times the entire conference. He was sidelined for three games during the Commissioner's Cup with a calf injury. In the Governors' Cup, he was injured with a severe ankle sprain, forcing him to miss several games. In his second game following the injury, he had 15 points on 6-of-9 shooting and 7 boards in almost 34 minutes of play against the Star Hotshots. They lost once again in the Finals to Ginebra.

Hodge missed some games during the 2017–18 Philippine Cup due to bone spurs, but returned in a win against the Kia Picanto despite needing two more weeks of rest. He left their game against the Phoenix Fuel Masters due to a knee injury. The injury was later revealed to be a MCL sprain, forcing him to miss the rest of the conference. In the Governors' Cup, he suffered a herniated disc.

Hodge returned fully healthy for the 2019 Philippine Cup. In a win over the Blackwater Elite, he had 12 points and 10 rebounds. He then had 14 points, nine rebounds, and six assists in a loss to the Columbian Dyip. After several more losses, he had 23 points and 10 rebounds in 54 minutes against the NorthPort Batang Pier to break their losing streak, even suffering cramps when he dove for the ball. They didn't make the playoffs for that conference. In the Governors' Cup, he missed the team's first six games to remove bone spurs in his ankle. Still, they made the Finals, where they lost once again to Ginebra.

In a 2020 Philippine Cup win over the Magnolia Hotshots, Hodge had 12 points, including two clutch free throws. That conference, Meralco finally got to its first Philippine cup semifinals by defeating the San Miguel Beermen. In Game 2 of the semis against Ginebra, he had 12 points and 11 rebounds to tie the series. After Ginebra won Game 3, he then stepped up with 16 points, six rebounds, three steals, and three assists to force a do-or-die Game 5. His last assist was to Chris Newsome, who sealed the win with a fastbreak layup. In Game 5, he had 14 points, but Ginebra won over them once again.

During the 2021 Philippine Cup, Hodge, along with Newsome, was placed into the league's health and safety protocols, forcing them to miss two games. In the quarterfinals, he had 16 points against the NLEX Road Warriors to bring Meralco to the semis. In the Governors' Cup, Meralco started strong by winning its first four games. They secured their spot in the conference's playoffs with a win over the Dyip in which he had 16 points and six boards. In a win over Phoenix, he had 14 points and eight assists. They got to the Finals where they faced Ginebra once again. In Game 1, he contributed 17 points on an efficient eight-of-nine shooting clip in the win. Despite his efforts in the following games, especially on defense, they lost to Ginebra once again in seven games. He was named to the All-Defensive Team for that season.

In the 2022 Philippine Cup quarterfinals, Hodge was finally able to lead Meralco past Ginebra, as he averaged 19 points, 10 rebounds, and 3.5 assists in the last two games of the series. In the semis, they faced the Beermen where they lost in seven games. Meralco then missed the playoffs of the Commissioner's Cup due to injuries to key players. In a Governors' Cup game against NorthPort, he was hit with an inadvertent elbow from NorthPort import Marcus Weathers, resulting to a cut on his upper lip. He kept playing and finished the game with 15 points and nine rebounds as Meralco won the game. That season, he got to the 1,000 offensive rebounds milestone while playing his 10th season with Meralco.

== National team career ==
In 2011, Hodge joined Sinag Pilipinas for the 26th Southeast Asian Games. One of his best games that tournament came in a win against Thailand, in which he had 15 points on six-of-seven shooting from the field along with three rebounds and two assists. They went on to win the tournament.

== Personal life ==
Hodge was born and raised Pensacola, Florida. His father is American while his mother is Filipino. He is married to Beatrice Yao.

Hodge is an animal lover. Together with his family, they own Bark Central, an indoor dog park and cafe.

== PBA career statistics ==
Legend
GP	Games played	MPG	Minutes per game	FG%	Field-goal percentage
3FG%	3-point field-goal percentage	4P%	4-point field-goal percentage	FT%	Free-throw percentage
RPG	Rebounds per game	APG	Assists per game	SPG	Steals per game
BPG	Blocks per game	PPG	Points per game	127	Career high

As of the end of 2025–26 season

=== Season-by-season averages ===
Year	Team	GP	MPG	FG%	3P%	4P%	FT%	RPG	APG	SPG	BPG	PPG
2012–13	Meralco	47	26.8	.403	.243	—	.552	6.4	1.0	.8	.8	9.7
2013–14	Meralco	30	31.3	.401	.294	—	.627	7.3	1.4	.9	.9	10.7
2014–15	Meralco	40	34.0	.425	.211	—	.492	8.1	1.9	.9	1.4	9.4
2015–16	Meralco	51	33.9	.414	.311	—	.582	7.6	2.0	.6	.8	11.5
2016–17	Meralco	43	30.6	.443	.281	—	.518	6.5	2.2	.7	.8	8.4
2017–18	Meralco	31	27.3	.500	.208	—	.510	5.4	1.8	.7	.5	6.8
2019	Meralco	39	25.4	.402	.100	—	.553	5.7	1.8	.7	.4	5.3
2020	Meralco	18	33.1	.605	.000	—	.571	6.2	2.2	.7	.8	9.8
2021	Meralco	40	28.1	.526	.286	—	.537	6.2	1.7	.9	.8	6.3
2022–23	Meralco	48	31.2	.534	.222	—	.561	7.2	2.1	1.0	.9	8.5
2023–24	Meralco	39	33.2	.528	.250	—	.622	7.7	2.3	.9	.9	9.5
2024–25	Meralco	36	28.4	.506	.500	.500	.566	6.2	2.3	.7	.8	8.6
2025–26	Meralco	48	28.9	.520	.000	—	.628	6.5	1.4	.7	.7	8.6
Career		510	30.1	.464	.258	.500	.565	6.7	1.8	.8	.8	8.7
