= 2022 PBA Philippine Cup =

First conference of the 2022–23 PBA season

- Duration: June 5 – September 4, 2022
- TV partner(s): Local: One Sports; TV5; PBA Rush (HD); International: AksyonTV International iWantTFC (Note: Live on iWantTFC worldwide excluding Philippines and United States)

Finals
- Champions: San Miguel Beermen
- Runners-up: TNT Tropang Giga

Awards
- Best Player: June Mar Fajardo (San Miguel Beermen)
- Finals MVP: June Mar Fajardo (San Miguel Beermen)

PBA Philippine Cup chronology
- < 2021 2024 >

PBA conference chronology
- < 2021 Governors' 2022–23 Commissioner's >

The 2022 PBA Philippine Cup, also known as the 2022 Honda PBA Philippine Cup for sponsorship reasons, was the first conference of the 2022–23 PBA season of the Philippine Basketball Association (PBA). The 44th PBA Philippine Cup started on June 5 and ended on September 4, 2022. The tournament did not allow teams to hire foreign players or imports. The conference also served as a qualification to the 2022–23 East Asia Super League, wherein the conference finalists will be the Philippines' representatives to the international club league.

== Format ==
The following format will be observed for the duration of the conference:

- Single-round robin eliminations; 11 games per team; Teams are then seeded by basis on win-loss records.
- Top eight teams will advance to the quarterfinals. In case of tie, playoff games will be held only for the #8 seed.
- Quarterfinals:
  - QF1: #1 vs #8 (#1 twice-to-beat)
  - QF2: #2 vs #7 (#2 twice-to-beat)
  - QF3: #3 vs #6 (best-of-3 series)
  - QF4: #4 vs #5 (best-of-3 series)
- Semifinals (best-of-7 series):
  - SF1: QF1 Winner vs. QF4 Winner
  - SF2: QF2 Winner vs. QF3 Winner
- Finals (best-of-7 series)
  - F1: SF1 Winner vs SF2 Winner

== Elimination round ==
=== Team standings ===
Pos	Team	W	L	PCT	GB	Qualification
1	San Miguel Beermen	9	2	.818	—	Twice-to-beat in the quarterfinals
2	TNT Tropang Giga	8	3	.727 (Note: Head-to-head quotient:TNT 1.12, Magnolia 0.99, Barangay Ginebra 0.90)	1	Twice-to-beat in the quarterfinals
3	Magnolia Chicken Timplados Hotshots	8	3	.727	1	Best-of-three quarterfinals
4	Barangay Ginebra San Miguel	8	3	.727	1	Best-of-three quarterfinals
5	Meralco Bolts	7	4	.636	2	Best-of-three quarterfinals
6	NLEX Road Warriors	6	5	.545	3	Best-of-three quarterfinals
7	Converge FiberXers	5	6	.455 (Note: Head-to-head record: Converge 1–0 Blackwater)	4	Twice-to-win in the quarterfinals
8	Blackwater Bossing	5	6	.455	4	Twice-to-win in the quarterfinals
9	Rain or Shine Elasto Painters	4	7	.364	5	
10	NorthPort Batang Pier	3	8	.273 (Note: Head-to-head record: NorthPort 1–0 Phoenix)	6	
11	Phoenix Super LPG Fuel Masters	3	8	.273	6	
12	Terrafirma Dyip	0	11	.000	9	

Source: PBA.ph
Rules for classification: 1) winning percentage; 2) if two teams are tied, head-to-head record; if three or more teams are tied, head-to-head goal average (quotient); if tied for 8th, one-game playoff; 3) overall quotient; 4) coin toss

=== Schedule ===
Team ╲ Game	1	2	3	4	5	6	7	8	9	10	11
Barangay Ginebra	BWB	ROS	MAG	NLEX	SMB	CON	TER	TNT	MER	NP	PHX
Blackwater	TNT	BGSM	NP	TER	MER	PHX	SMB	ROS	NLEX	CON	MAG
Converge	ROS	MAG	TNT	MER	TER	SMB	BGSM	NLEX	NP	PHX	BWB
Magnolia	TNT	CON	NP	SMB	BGSM	PHX	NLEX	TER	MER	ROS	BWB
Meralco	PHX	CON	TNT	NP	NLEX	BWB	ROS	BGSM	MAG	SMB	TER
NLEX	TER	SMB	TNT	BGSM	MER	PHX	MAG	CON	ROS	BWB	NP
NorthPort	ROS	TER	MAG	BWB	MER	TNT	SMB	CON	PHX	BGSM	NLEX
Phoenix Super LPG	SMB	MER	TER	ROS	MAG	TNT	NLEX	BWB	NP	CON	BGSM
Rain or Shine	CON	NP	BGSM	PHX	TNT	SMB	MER	NLEX	BWB	TER	MAG
San Miguel	PHX	NLEX	MAG	BGSM	CON	ROS	NP	TNT	BWB	TER	MER
Terrafirma	NLEX	NP	PHX	CON	BWB	TNT	BGSM	MAG	SMB	ROS	MER
TNT	MAG	BWB	CON	NLEX	MER	ROS	PHX	NP	TER	SMB	BGSM

Source: PBA.ph
= Win; = OT win; = Loss; = OT loss

=== Results ===
Teams	BGSM	BWB	CON	MAG	MER	NLEX	NP	PHX	ROS	SMB	TER	TNT
Barangay Ginebra	—	85–82	105–89	84–89	73–90	83–75	100–93	100–93	90–85	75–72	106–82	92–106
Blackwater		—	90–92	66–75	90–89	68–98	97–90	91–89	90–107	107–110*	107–70	85–78
Converge			—	89–82*	74–90	112–108	104–98	66–89	77–79	92–111	97–84	83–86
Magnolia				—	97–88*	87–73	80–77	95–77	118–87	81–87	104–83	72–78
Meralco					—	75–90	97–87	109–98	77–73	89–86	105–89	71–78
NLEX						—	109–95	114–108*	86–96	92–100	105–102	90–89
NorthPort							—	95–92	94–81	106–122	100–86	112–117
Phoenix Super LPG								—	106–102	100–108	97–74	72–87
Rain or Shine									—	93–99	97–82	85–89*
San Miguel										—	109–108*	115–99
Terrafirma											—	86–114
TNT												—

Source: PBA.ph results, PBA.ph schedule
Legend: Blue = left column team win; Red = top row team win.
Matches with lighter background shading were decided after overtime.

== Bracket ==
Quarterfinals
(#1 twice-to-beat)
1	San Miguel	123
8	Blackwater	93
(Best-of-3)
4	Barangay Ginebra	1
5	Meralco	2
(#2 twice-to-beat)
2	TNT	116
7	Converge	95
(Best-of-3)
3	Magnolia	2
6	NLEX	1

Semifinals (Best-of-7)
1	San Miguel	4
5	Meralco	3
2	TNT	4
3	Magnolia	2

Finals (Best-of-7)
1	San Miguel	4
2	TNT	3

== Quarterfinals ==
=== (1) San Miguel vs. (8) Blackwater ===
San Miguel has the twice-to-beat advantage; they have to be beaten twice, while their opponents just once, to advance.

One Sports

July 27
6:00 pm

Box score

San Miguel Beermen 123, Blackwater Bossing 93
Scoring by quarter: 32–13, 31–26, 31–24, 29–30
Pts: Lassiter, Perez 18; Rebs: Brondial 15; Asts: Ross 12	Pts: Ular 15; Rebs: Ular 11; Asts: Amer 5
San Miguel wins series in one game

Araneta Coliseum, Quezon City
Referees: Nol Quilinguen, Rommel Gruta, Janine Nicandro, Kenny Hallig

=== (2) TNT vs. (7) Converge ===
TNT has the twice-to-beat advantage; they have to be beaten twice, while their opponents just once, to advance.

One Sports

July 27
3:00 pm

Box score

TNT Tropang Giga 116, Converge FiberXers 95
Scoring by quarter: 30–20, 40–22, 27–25, 19–28
Pts: M. Williams 26; Rebs: Rosario 7 Asts: M. Williams 4	Pts: Hill 18; Rebs: Tratter 11; Asts: Ilagan, Murrell 4
TNT wins series in one game

Araneta Coliseum, Quezon City
Referees: Peter Balao, Rey Yante, Niño Cortez, Tom Mendoza

=== (3) Magnolia vs. (6) NLEX ===
This is a best-of-three playoff.

One Sports

July 24
4:30 pm

Box score

Magnolia Chicken Timplados Hotshots 98, NLEX Road Warriors 89
Scoring by quarter: 24–26, 40–21, 17–23, 17–19
Pts: Barroca 24; Rebs: Abueva 8 Asts: Jalalon, Lee 5	Pts: Semerad 19; Rebs: Semerad 6 Asts: four players 4

Araneta Coliseum, Quezon City
Referees: Nol Quilingen, Rommel Gruta, Jeff Tantay, Bryan Peclaro

One Sports

July 29
6:00 pm

Box score

Magnolia Chicken Timplados Hotshots 77, NLEX Road Warriors 90
Scoring by quarter: 18–25, 14–30, 27–18, 18–17
Pts: Abueva 20; Rebs: Abueva 7 Asts: Barroca, Jalalon 5	Pts: Alas 30; Rebs: Trollano 12; Asts: Alas, Trollano 4

Filoil EcoOil Centre, San Juan
Referees: Peter Balao, Rommel Gruta, Bing Oliva, Dacx Dacanay

One Sports

July 31
4:30 pm

Box score

Magnolia Chicken Timplados Hotshots 112, NLEX Road Warriors 106 (OT)
Scoring by quarter: 26–30, 25–24, 28–24, 18–19, Overtime: 15–9
Pts: Sangalang 24; Rebs: Sangalang 11; Asts: Abueva, Jalalon 6	Pts: Oftana 32; Rebs: Alas 11; Asts: Alas, Trollano 5
Magnolia wins series, 2–1

SM Mall of Asia Arena, Pasay
Referees: Nol Quilinguen, Rommel Gruta, Albert Nubla, Jeffrey Tantay

=== (4) Barangay Ginebra vs. (5) Meralco ===
This is a best-of-three playoff.

One Sports

July 24
6:30 pm

Box score

Barangay Ginebra San Miguel 82, Meralco Bolts 93
Scoring by quarter: 25–32, 18–21, 19–27, 20–13
Pts: Thompson 29; Rebs: Thompson 10; Asts: Tenorio 4	Pts: Black 25; Rebs: Newsome, Pascual 9 Asts: Newsome 6

Araneta Coliseum, Quezon City
Referees: Jimmy Mariano, Bing Oliva, Dacx Dacanay, Mike Flordeliza

One Sports

July 29
3:00 pm

Box score

Barangay Ginebra San Miguel 94, Meralco Bolts 87
Scoring by quarter: 25–25, 31–20, 13–26, 25–16
Pts: Aguilar 25; Rebs: Standhardinger 12; Asts: Thompson 9	Pts: Hodge 25; Rebs: Almazan 10; Asts: Newsome 6

Filoil EcoOil Centre, San Juan
Referees: Nol Quilinguen, Mike Flordeliza, Janine Nicandro, Gomer Obina

One Sports

July 31
6:30 pm

Box score

Barangay Ginebra San Miguel 104, Meralco Bolts 106
Scoring by quarter: 18–24, 24–31, 34–30, 28–21
Pts: Thompson 26; Rebs: Standhardinger 10; Asts: Pringle, Tenorio 6	Pts: Newsome 21; Rebs: Hodge 18; Asts: Newsome 12
Meralco wins series, 2–1

SM Mall of Asia Arena, Pasay
Referees: Peter Balao, Rey Yante, Mike Flordeliza, Jerry Narandan

== Semifinals ==
All match-ups are best-of-seven playoffs.

=== (1) San Miguel vs. (5) Meralco ===
One Sports

August 3
6:00 pm

Box score

San Miguel Beermen 121, Meralco Bolts 97
Scoring by quarter: 33–17, 27–24, 25–23, 36–33
Pts: Perez 25; Rebs: Brondial 11; Asts: Cruz, Fajardo 5	Pts: Banchero 17; Rebs: four players 6 Asts: Banchero 5

Araneta Coliseum, Quezon City
Referees: Nol Quilinguen, Sherwin Pineda, Janine Nicandro, Tom Mendoza

One Sports

August 5
3:00 pm

Box score

San Miguel Beermen 88, Meralco Bolts 99
Scoring by quarter: 20–34, 28–17, 24–25, 16–23
Pts: Fajardo 22; Rebs: Fajardo 17; Asts: Cruz 5	Pts: Hodge 17; Rebs: Hodge 14; Asts: Newsome 5

Araneta Coliseum, Quezon City
Referees: Jimmy Mariano, Rey Yante, Albert Nubla, Joel Baldago

One Sports

August 7
6:30 pm

Box score

San Miguel Beermen 96, Meralco Bolts 91
Scoring by quarter: 25–24, 21–18, 25–24, 25–25
Pts: Perez 26; Rebs: Fajardo 16; Asts: Ross, Tautuaa 5	Pts: Newsome 16; Rebs: Hodge 13; Asts: Newsome 6

Araneta Coliseum, Quezon City
Referees: Nol Quilinguen, Sherwin Pineda, Mike Flordeliza, Albert Nubla

One Sports

August 10
3:00 pm

Box score

San Miguel Beermen 97, Meralco Bolts 111
Scoring by quarter: 23–36, 30–22, 18–30, 26–23
Pts: Perez 24; Rebs: Fajardo 13; Asts: Cruz, Perez 4	Pts: Black 21; Rebs: Black, Hodge 7 Asts: Black 7

Araneta Coliseum, Quezon City
Referees: Jimmy Mariano, Rey Yante, Janine Nicandro, Tom Mendoza

One Sports

August 12
6:00 pm

Box score

San Miguel Beermen 89, Meralco Bolts 78
Scoring by quarter: 25–22, 16–22, 26–12, 22–22
Pts: Perez 25; Rebs: Fajardo 15; Asts: Perez 5	Pts: Newsome 24; Rebs: Black 11; Asts: Black, Newsome 4

Araneta Coliseum, Quezon City
Referees: Nol Quilinguen, Sherwin Pineda, Bing Oliva, Jeffrey Tantay

One Sports

August 14
4:30 pm

Box score

San Miguel Beermen 92, Meralco Bolts 96
Scoring by quarter: 33–22, 23–23, 18–26, 18–25
Pts: Fajardo 23; Rebs: Fajardo 13; Asts: Cruz, Tautuaa 3	Pts: Newsome 19; Rebs: Hodge 12; Asts: Black 6

Araneta Coliseum, Quezon City
Attendance: 9,439
Referees: Peter Balao, Dacx Dacanay, Mike Flordeliza, Joel Baldago

One Sports

August 17
6:00 pm

Box score

San Miguel Beermen 100, Meralco Bolts 89
Scoring by quarter: 26–12, 19–19, 28–23, 27–35
Pts: Fajardo 29; Rebs: Fajardo 14; Asts: Perez 9	Pts: Hodge 23; Rebs: Hodge 8 Asts: three players 4
San Miguel wins series, 4–3

Araneta Coliseum, Quezon City
Referees: Nol Quilinguen, Bing Oliva, Mike Flordeliza, Joel Baldago

=== (2) TNT vs. (3) Magnolia ===
One Sports

August 3
3:00 pm

Box score

TNT Tropang Giga 108, Magnolia Chicken Timplados Hotshots 96
Scoring by quarter: 28–19, 26–18, 32–29, 22–30
Pts: M. Williams 26; Rebs: Erram 8 Asts: Castro, Pogoy 5	Pts: Abueva 18; Rebs: Dionisio 13; Asts: Jalalon 8

Araneta Coliseum, Quezon City
Referees: Jimmy Mariano, Rommel Gruta, Mardy Montoya, Jerry Narandan

One Sports

August 5
6:00 pm

Box score

TNT Tropang Giga 88, Magnolia Chicken Timplados Hotshots 92
Scoring by quarter: 12–18, 17–21, 29–30, 30–23
Pts: M. Williams 28; Rebs: Castro 8 Asts: Ganuelas-Rosser 7	Pts: Barroca 22; Rebs: Abueva, Sangalang 8 Asts: Abueva 5

Araneta Coliseum, Quezon City
Referees: Peter Balao, Sherwin Pineda, Dacx Dacanay, Mike Flordeliza

One Sports

August 7
4:30 pm

Box score

TNT Tropang Giga 93, Magnolia Chicken Timplados Hotshots 92
Scoring by quarter: 18–24, 29–17, 19–32, 27–19
Pts: Erram 22; Rebs: Khobuntin 9 Asts: M. Williams 10	Pts: Abueva 18; Rebs: Sangalang 9 Asts: Jalalon 7

Araneta Coliseum, Quezon City
Referees: Peter Balao, Rommel Gruta, Joel Baldago, Jeffrey Tantay

One Sports

August 10
6:00 pm

Box score

TNT Tropang Giga 102, Magnolia Chicken Timplados Hotshots 84
Scoring by quarter: 18–15, 24–23, 28–16, 32–30
Pts: Erram 19; Rebs: Erram 13; Asts: M. Williams 7	Pts: Sangalang 19; Rebs: three players 6 Asts: Abueva 6

Araneta Coliseum, Quezon City
Referees: Nol Quilinguen, Bing Oliva, Mardy Montoya, Jerry Narandan

One Sports

August 12
3:00 pm

Box score

TNT Tropang Giga 97, Magnolia Chicken Timplados Hotshots 105
Scoring by quarter: 26–28, 19–31, 28–22, 24–24
Pts: Castro 18; Rebs: K. Williams 10; Asts: M. Williams 6	Pts: Barroca 25; Rebs: Abueva 10; Asts: Abueva 5

Araneta Coliseum, Quezon City
Referees: Peter Balao, Rommel Gruta, Albert Nubla, Joel Baldago

One Sports

August 14
6:30 pm

Box score

TNT Tropang Giga 87, Magnolia Chicken Timplados Hotshots 74
Scoring by quarter: 21–17, 21–17, 18–21, 27–19
Pts: Castro 26; Rebs: K. Williams 13; Asts: M. Williams 5	Pts: Abueva, Sangalang 16; Rebs: Sangalang 12; Asts: Barroca 9
TNT wins series, 4–2

Araneta Coliseum, Quezon City
Attendance: 9,439
Referees: Sherwin Pineda, Rommel Gruta, Bing Oliva, Janine Nicandro

== Finals ==
This is a best-of-seven playoff. The two finalists also qualify to the 2022–23 East Asia Super League season.

One Sports

August 21
6:00 pm

Box score

San Miguel Beermen 84, TNT Tropang Giga 86

Araneta Coliseum, Quezon City

One Sports

August 24
5:45 pm

Box score

San Miguel Beermen 109, TNT Tropang Giga 100

Araneta Coliseum, Quezon City

One Sports

August 26
5:45 pm

Box score

San Miguel Beermen 108, TNT Tropang Giga 100 (OT)

SM Mall of Asia Arena, Pasay

One Sports

August 28
6:03 pm

Box score

San Miguel Beermen 87, TNT Tropang Giga 100

Araneta Coliseum, Quezon City

One Sports

August 31
5:45 pm

Box score

San Miguel Beermen 93, TNT Tropang Giga 102

Araneta Coliseum, Quezon City

One Sports

September 2
5:45 pm

Box score

San Miguel Beermen 114, TNT Tropang Giga 96

Araneta Coliseum, Quezon City

One Sports

September 4
6:00 pm

Box score

San Miguel Beermen 119, TNT Tropang Giga 97
San Miguel wins series, 4–3

Araneta Coliseum, Quezon City

== Awards ==
=== Players of the Week ===
Week	Player	Ref.
June 5–12	Jamie Malonzo (NorthPort Batang Pier)	
June 15–19	Ian Sangalang (Magnolia Chicken Timplados Hotshots)	
June 22–26	Japeth Aguilar (Barangay Ginebra San Miguel)	
June 29 – July 2	Ato Ular (Blackwater Bossing)	
July 6–10	Jericho Cruz (San Miguel Beermen)	
July 13–17	Chris Newsome (Meralco Bolts)	
July 20–24	Mark Barroca (Magnolia Chicken Timplados Hotshots)	
July 27–31	Cliff Hodge (Meralco Bolts)	
August 3–7	Jayson Castro (TNT Tropang Giga)	
August 10–14	Jayson Castro (TNT Tropang Giga)	

== Statistics ==
=== Individual statistical leaders ===
Category	Player	Team	Statistic
Points per game	Roger Pogoy	TNT Tropang Giga	18.9
Rebounds per game	June Mar Fajardo	San Miguel Beermen	14.2
Assists per game	Roi Sumang	NorthPort Batang Pier	6.5
Steals per game	CJ Perez	San Miguel Beermen	2.5
Blocks per game	Japeth Aguilar	Barangay Ginebra San Miguel	2.6
Turnovers per game	Matthew Wright	Phoenix Super LPG Fuel Masters	4.3
Fouls per game	Calvin Abueva	Magnolia Chicken Timplados Hotshots	4.2
Minutes per game	Scottie Thompson	Barangay Ginebra San Miguel	39.8
FG%	Larry Muyang	Phoenix Super LPG Fuel Masters	64.9%
FT%	Paul Lee	Magnolia Chicken Timplados Hotshots	88.9%
3FG%	Tyler Tio	Phoenix Super LPG Fuel Masters	49.1%
Double-doubles	June Mar Fajardo	San Miguel Beermen	20
Triple-doubles	three players		1

=== Individual game highs ===
Category	Player	Team	Statistic
Points	Ato Ular	Blackwater Bossing	34
Rebounds	June Mar Fajardo	San Miguel Beermen	27
Assists	four players		12
Steals	Jio Jalalon	Magnolia Chicken Timplados Hotshots	6
Steals	CJ Perez	San Miguel Beermen	6
Blocks	Japeth Aguilar	Barangay Ginebra San Miguel	7
Three point field goals	Robert Bolick	NorthPort Batang Pier	8

=== Team statistical leaders ===
Category	Team	Statistic
Points per game	San Miguel Beermen	101.5
Rebounds per game	San Miguel Beermen	45.8
Assists per game	Barangay Ginebra San Miguel	23.9
Steals per game	Magnolia Chicken Timplados Hotshots	8.8
Blocks per game	TNT Tropang Giga	5.0
Turnovers per game	Blackwater Bossing	16.3
Fouls per game	Meralco Bolts	25.6
FG%	San Miguel Beermen	47.3%
FT%	NorthPort Batang Pier	72.8%
3FG%	Meralco Bolts	35.5%

== Final rankings ==
Pos	Team	Pld	W	L	Best finish
1	San Miguel Beermen (C)	26	18	8	Champion
2	TNT Tropang Giga	25	16	9	Runner-up
3	Magnolia Chicken Timplados Hotshots	20	12	8	Semifinalist
4	Meralco Bolts	21	12	9	Semifinalist
5	Barangay Ginebra San Miguel	14	9	5	Quarterfinalist
6	NLEX Road Warriors	14	7	7	Quarterfinalist
7	Converge FiberXers	12	5	7	Quarterfinalist
8	Blackwater Bossing	12	5	7	Quarterfinalist
9	Rain or Shine Elasto Painters	11	4	7	Elimination round
10	NorthPort Batang Pier	11	3	8	Elimination round
11	Phoenix Super LPG Fuel Masters	11	3	8	Elimination round
12	Terrafirma Dyip	11	0	11	Elimination round

Rules for classification: 1) finals result, 2) elimination round seed of semifinalists, 3) elimination round seed of quarterfinalists, 4) elimination round finish
(C) Champions
