= Jolo Mendoza =

Filipino basketball player

No. 4 – Rizal Golden Coolers
- Position: Shooting guard
- League: MPBL

Personal information
- Born: January 31, 1998 (age 28)
- Listed height: 5 ft 10 in (1.78 m)

Career information
- High school: Ateneo (Quezon City)
- College: Ateneo
- PBA draft: 2023: 3rd round, 32nd overall pick
- Drafted by: Meralco Bolts
- Playing career: 2022–present

Career history
- 2022: Rizal Golden Coolers
- 2022–2023: Pampanga Royce
- 2023–2025: Meralco Bolts
- 2025: Abra Solid North Weavers
- 2026–present: Rizal Golden Coolers

Career highlights
- PBA champion (2024 Philippine); 2× UAAP champion (2017, 2018)

Jose Lorenzo Bernal Mendoza (born January 31, 1998) is a Filipino professional basketball player for the Rizal Golden Coolers of the Maharlika Pilipinas Basketball League (MPBL).

Mendoza played his entire high school and collegiate career with the Ateneo Blue Eagles, winning a juniors championship in 2015 and two seniors championships in 2017 and 2018. In 2022, he turned pro, joining the Rizal Golden Coolers of the Maharlika Pilipinas Basketball League (MPBL) followed by the Pampanga Royce of the Pilipinas Super League (PSL). In 2023, he was selected by the Meralco Bolts with the 32nd pick of the PBA season 48 draft. He then won a championship with the team in the 2024 PBA Philippine Cup finals.

== High school and college career ==
Throughout his high school and college career, Mendoza played for the Ateneo de Manila University Blue Eagles of the University Athletic Association of the Philippines (UAAP). In 2015, he led the Blue Eagles to winning the UAAP Season 77 juniors' basketball tournament, earning a Finals MVP nod. On February 19, 2016, he committed to remain in Ateneo going into college, where he would go on to win back-to-back championships in Season 80 (2017) and Season 81 (2018). He played his final year with the Blue Eagles in UAAP Season 84 (2021–22).

== Professional career ==
=== Rizal Golden Coolers (2022) ===
In 2022, Mendoza forwent his final playing year with Ateneo, choosing to go professional by joining the Rizal Golden Coolers of the Maharlika Pilipinas Basketball League. He led the team's scoring after averaging 13.6 points, 2.9 rebounds, and 1.7 assists.

=== Pampanga Royce (2022–2023) ===
After his single season with Rizal, he then moved to the Pampanga Royce of the Pilipinas Super League, where he also led the team in scoring. Mendoza then joined the Converge FiberXers for the preseason PBA on Tour, as both the Royce and FiberXers shared the same management team.

=== Meralco Bolts (2023–2025) ===
In the PBA season 48 draft, Mendoza was selected by the Meralco Bolts in the third round with the 32nd pick, and in his rookie season, became part of the team's first title run.

== National team career ==
Mendoza also represented the Philippines at the youth level, with him playing at the 2013 FIBA Asia Under-16 Championship, 2014 FIBA Under-17 World Championship, and 2016 FIBA Asia Under-18 Championship.

== Career statistics ==
=== MPBL ===
Legend
| GP | Games played | GS | Games started | MPG | Minutes per game |
| FG% | Field-goal percentage | 3P% | 3-point field-goal percentage | FT% | Free-throw percentage |
| RPG | Rebounds per game | APG | Assists per game | SPG | Steals per game |
| BPG | Blocks per game | PPG | Points per game | **Bold** | Career high |

==== Season-by-season averages ====
| Year | Team | GP | GS | MPG | FG% | 3P% | FT% | RPG | APG | SPG | BPG | PPG |
|---|---|---|---|---|---|---|---|---|---|---|---|---|
| 2022 | Rizal | 18 | 7 | 22.5 | .421 | .402 | .833 | 2.9 | 1.7 | .7 | .0 | 13.6 |

=== PBA ===
Legend
| GP | Games played | MPG | Minutes per game | FG% | Field-goal percentage |
| 3FG% | 3-point field-goal percentage | 4P% | 4-point field-goal percentage | FT% | Free-throw percentage |
| RPG | Rebounds per game | APG | Assists per game | SPG | Steals per game |
| BPG | Blocks per game | PPG | Points per game | **127** | Career high |

As of the end of 2024–25 season

=== Season-by-season averages ===
| Year | Team | GP | MPG | FG% | 3P% | 4P% | FT% | RPG | APG | SPG | BPG | PPG |
|---|---|---|---|---|---|---|---|---|---|---|---|---|
| 2023–24 | Meralco | 12 | 9.2 | **.432** | .393 | — | .625 | .5 | **.8** | **.2** | — | 4.0 |
| 2024–25 | Meralco | **18** | **9.7** | .429 | **.419** | .600 | **.714** | **.8** | .7 | .1 | — | **4.3** |
| Career | | 30 | 9.5 | .430 | .407 | .600 | .667 | .7 | .8 | .1 | — | 4.2 |
