= 2024 PBA Philippine Cup finals =

2024 edition of the PBA Philippine Cup finals

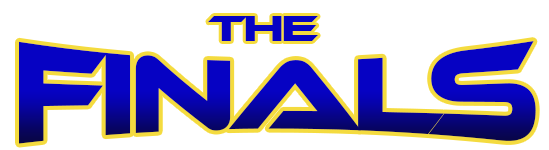
Team	Coach	Wins
(3) Meralco Bolts	Luigi Trillo	4
(1) San Miguel Beermen	Jorge Gallent	2
- Dates: June 5–16, 2024
- MVP: Chris Newsome (Meralco Bolts)
- Television: Local: RPTV; PBA Rush (HD); International: Pilipinas Live; Online: Pilipinas Live
- Announcers: see Broadcast notes
- Radio network: DZSR
- Announcers: see Broadcast notes

Referees
- Game 1: Nol Quilinguen, Rey Yante, Niño Cortez, Joel Baldago
- Game 2: Nol Quilinguen, Bing Oliva, Mike Flordeliza, Irewin Traballo
- Game 3: Jimmy Mariano, Rommel Gruta, Jerry Narandan, Jeffrey Tantay
- Game 4: Jimmy Mariano, Jerry Narandan, Mardy Montoya, James Paez
- Game 5: Nol Quilinguen, Rey Yante, Bing Oliva, Don-Al De Dios
- Game 6: Nol Quilinguen, Jeffrey Tantay, Joel Baldago, Mike Flordeliza

PBA Philippine Cup finals chronology
- < 2022 2025 >

PBA finals chronology
- < 2023–24 Commissioner's 2024 Governors' >

The 2024 Philippine Basketball Association (PBA) Philippine Cup finals was a best-of-7 championship series of the 2024 PBA Philippine Cup. It marked the end of the conference's playoffs and 2023–24 PBA season.

The Meralco Bolts and the San Miguel Beermen competed for the 45th Philippine Cup championship and the 135th overall championship contested by the league. This is the first time that Meralco and San Miguel ever faced in the finals.

Meralco defeated San Miguel in six games to claim their first championship in franchise history. In May 2025, they were awarded the Philippines' slot in the 2025 Basketball Champions League Asia.

== Background ==
=== Road to the finals ===
Meralco Bolts		San Miguel Beermen
Finished 6–5 (.545) in 3rd place	Elimination round	Finished 10–1 (.909) in 1st place
Def. NLEX, 2–0	Quarterfinals	Def. Terrafirma in two games (twice-to-beat advantage)
Def. Barangay Ginebra, 4–3	Semifinals	Def. Rain or Shine, 4–0

=== Head-to-head matchup ===
RPTV

May 4
6:15 pm

Box score

Meralco Bolts 95, San Miguel Beermen 92
Scoring by quarter: 27–20, 25–24, 30–22, 13–26
Pts: Hodge 20; Rebs: Hodge 13; Asts: Newsome 6	Pts: Fajardo 23; Rebs: Fajardo 19; Asts: Fajardo 4

Batangas City Sports Center, Batangas City
Referees: Bing Oliva, Mardy Montoya, Jerry Narandan, Niño Cortez

== Series summary ==
Game	Date	Venue	Winner	Result
Game 1	June 5	Smart Araneta Coliseum	Meralco	93–86
Game 2	June 7	Smart Araneta Coliseum	San Miguel	95–94
Game 3	June 9	Smart Araneta Coliseum	Meralco	93–89
Game 4	June 12	Smart Araneta Coliseum	San Miguel	111–101
Game 5	June 14	Smart Araneta Coliseum	Meralco	92–88
Game 6	June 16	Smart Araneta Coliseum	Meralco	80–78

== Game summaries ==
=== Game 1 ===
RPTV

June 5
7:30 pm

Box score

Meralco Bolts 93, San Miguel Beermen 86
Scoring by quarter: 19–20, 25–31, 26–21, 23–14
Pts: Banchero, Newsome 18; Rebs: Hodge 15; Asts: Banchero, Newsome 5	Pts: Fajardo 23; Rebs: Fajardo 10; Asts: Ross 6
Meralco leads series, 1–0

Smart Araneta Coliseum, Quezon City
Referees: Nol Quilinguen, Rey Yante, Niño Cortez, Joel Baldago

=== Game 2 ===
RPTV

June 7
7:30 pm

Box score

Meralco Bolts 94, San Miguel Beermen 95
Scoring by quarter: 22–21, 26–28, 25–20, 21–26
Pts: Hodge 25; Rebs: Bates, Hodge 9 Asts: Newsome 5	Pts: Perez 34; Rebs: Fajardo 13; Asts: Ross 6
Series tied, 1–1

Smart Araneta Coliseum, Quezon City
Referees: Nol Quilinguen, Bing Oliva, Mike Flordeliza, Irewin Traballo

=== Game 3 ===
RPTV

June 9
6:15 pm

Box score

Meralco Bolts 93, San Miguel Beermen 89
Scoring by quarter: 28–24, 20–22, 23–24, 22–19
Pts: Newsome 26; Rebs: Almazan, Hodge 13; Asts: Banchero 6	Pts: Tautuaa 19; Rebs: Fajardo 15; Asts: Ross 4
Meralco leads series, 2–1

Smart Araneta Coliseum, Quezon City
Referees: Jimmy Mariano, Rommel Gruta, Jerry Narandan, Jeffrey Tantay

=== Game 4 ===
RPTV

June 12
7:30 pm

Box score

Meralco Bolts 101, San Miguel Beermen 111
Scoring by quarter: 22–29, 18–22, 34–31, 27–29
Pts: Newsome 40; Rebs: Hodge 10; Asts: Newsome 4	Pts: Fajardo 28; Rebs: Fajardo 13; Asts: Perez, Ross 6
Series tied, 2–2

Smart Araneta Coliseum, Quezon City
Referees: Jimmy Mariano, Jerry Narandan, Mardy Montoya, James Paez

Prior to the game, San Miguel's June Mar Fajardo was awarded his tenth Best Player of the Conference award, extending his record for most career BPC awards.

=== Game 5 ===
RPTV

June 14
7:30 pm

Box score

Meralco Bolts 92, San Miguel Beermen 88
Scoring by quarter: 24–25, 23–21, 22–24, 23–18
Pts: Maliksi, Newsome 22; Rebs: Hodge 9 Asts: Newsome 5	Pts: Fajardo 38; Rebs: Fajardo 18; Asts: Tautuaa 4
Meralco leads series, 3–2

Smart Araneta Coliseum, Quezon City
Referees: Nol Quilinguen, Rey Yante, Bing Oliva, Don-Al De Dios

=== Game 6 ===
RPTV

June 16
6:15 pm

Box score

Meralco Bolts 80, San Miguel Beermen 78
Scoring by quarter: 29–18, 18–22, 16–18, 17–20
Pts: Newsome 15; Rebs: Almazan 10; Asts: Banchero 8	Pts: Fajardo 21; Rebs: Fajardo 12; Asts: Fajardo 5
Meralco wins series, 4–2

Smart Araneta Coliseum, Quezon City
Referees: Nol Quilinguen, Jeffrey Tantay, Joel Baldago, Mike Flordeliza

Before Meralco even won the championship, June Mar Fajardo makes an off-balance game tying three which was unexpected and keeps San Miguel team hopes alive for an OT or for a possible Game 7, but not until Chris Newsome hits the game-winner to seal the championship of the 2024 PBA Philippine Cup finals. Chris Newsome wins Finals MVP.

== Rosters ==
Meralco Bolts roster
Players
Coaches

Pos.	#	POB	Name	Height	Weight	DOB (YYYY–MM–DD)	From
G	1	(Philippines)	Aaron Black (injured)	6 ft 1 in (1.85 m)	180 lb (82 kg)	1996–12–03	Ateneo
G	4	(Philippines)	Diego Dario	5 ft 8 in (1.73 m)	145 lb (66 kg)	1997–01–06	UP Diliman
G	6	(United States)	Chris Banchero	6 ft 1 in (1.85 m)	175 lb (79 kg)	1989–01–24	Seattle Pacific
F	7	(United States)	Cliff Hodge	6 ft 4 in (1.93 m)	195 lb (88 kg)	1988–02–03	Hawaii Pacific
G	10	(Philippines)	Jolo Mendoza (R)	5 ft 10 in (1.78 m)		1998–01–31	Ateneo
G/F	11	(United States)	Chris Newsome	6 ft 2 in (1.88 m)	190 lb (86 kg)	1990–07–25	Ateneo
G	17	(Philippines)	Anjo Caram	5 ft 7 in (1.70 m)	159 lb (72 kg)	1991–01–14	San Beda
G/F	19	(Philippines)	Bong Quinto	6 ft 2 in (1.88 m)		1994–12–15	Letran
C	20	(Philippines)	Raymond Almazan (C)	6 ft 8 in (2.03 m)	194 lb (88 kg)	1989–08–02	Letran
G/F	22	(Philippines)	Allein Maliksi	6 ft 3 in (1.91 m)	180 lb (82 kg)	1987–09–18	UST
G/F	23	(Philippines)	Alvin Pasaol	6 ft 2 in (1.88 m)	200 lb (91 kg)	1995–05–06	UE
F	24	(Philippines)	Raymar Jose	6 ft 4 in (1.93 m)	210 lb (95 kg)	1992–08–06	Far Eastern
G/F	27	(Philippines)	Jansen Rios	6 ft 3 in (1.91 m)	185 lb (84 kg)	1991–10–28	Adamson
F/C	29	(Canada)	Norbert Torres	6 ft 7 in (2.01 m)	250 lb (113 kg)	1990–01–12	De La Salle
F/C	32	(United States)	Kyle Pascual	6 ft 6 in (1.98 m)	210 lb (95 kg)	1990–04–13	San Beda
C	33	(Australia)	Brandon Bates (R)	6 ft 8 in (2.03 m)	231 lb (105 kg)		De La Salle

Head coach

- (Philippines) Luigi Trillo

Assistant coach(es)

- (Philippines) Gene Afable (1st assistant)
- (Philippines) Reynel Hugnatan
- (Philippines) Sandro Soriano
- (Serbia) Nenad Vučinić (active consultant)
- (United States) Norman Black (consultant)

Team manager

- (Philippines) Paolo Trillo

Legend

- (C) Team captain
- (CI) Commissioner's Cup Import
- (GI) Governors' Cup Import
- (EI) EASL Import
- (DP) Unsigned draft pick
- (FA) Free agent
- (IN) Inactive
- (S) Suspended
- (R) Rookie
- Injured

Roster

San Miguel Beermen roster
Players
Coaches

Pos.	#	POB	Name	Height	Weight	DOB (YYYY–MM–DD)	From
G	0	(United States)	Simon Enciso	5 ft 11 in (1.80 m)	185 lb (84 kg)	1991–02–12	Notre Dame de Namur
F	2	(Philippines)	Don Trollano	6 ft 3 in (1.91 m)	182 lb (83 kg)	1992–01–07	Adamson
F/C	3	(United States)	Moala Tautuaa	6 ft 8 in (2.03 m)	245 lb (111 kg)	1989–04–30	Chadron State
F	4	(Philippines)	Troy Mallillin (R)	6 ft 4 in (1.93 m)	190 lb (86 kg)		Ateneo
G	6	(United States)	Chris Ross (C)	6 ft 1 in (1.85 m)	180 lb (82 kg)	1985–03–09	Marshall
G	7	(Philippines)	Terrence Romeo	5 ft 11 in (1.80 m)	178 lb (81 kg)	1992–03–16	Far Eastern
G/F	13	(United States)	Marcio Lassiter	6 ft 2 in (1.88 m)	185 lb (84 kg)	1987–05–16	Cal State Fullerton
C	15	(Philippines)	June Mar Fajardo	6 ft 10 in (2.08 m)	268 lb (122 kg)	1989–11–17	Cebu
G/F	21	(Philippines)	Jeron Teng	6 ft 2 in (1.88 m)	185 lb (84 kg)	1994–03–21	De La Salle
G	39	(Philippines)	Jericho Cruz	6 ft 1 in (1.85 m)	190 lb (86 kg)	1990–10–11	Adamson
G	76	(Saudi Arabia)	Kyt Jimenez (R)	5 ft 11 in (1.80 m)	165 lb (75 kg)		UPHSD
G/F	77	(Hong Kong)	CJ Perez	6 ft 2 in (1.88 m)	185 lb (84 kg)	1993–11–17	Lyceum
F	87	(Philippines)	Vic Manuel	6 ft 4 in (1.93 m)	201 lb (91 kg)	1987–06–18	PSBA
F/C	91	(Philippines)	Rodney Brondial	6 ft 5 in (1.96 m)	210 lb (95 kg)	1990–11–20	Adamson

Head coach

- (Philippines) Jorge Gallent

Assistant coach(es)

- (Philippines) Peter Martin (1st assistant)
- (Philippines) Ato Agustin
- (Philippines) Dayong Mendoza
- (Philippines) Biboy Ravanes
- (United States) Chris Ross
- (Philippines) Boyzie Zamar
- (Philippines) Leo Austria (consultant)

Team manager

- (Philippines) Gee Abanilla
- (Philippines) Daniel Henares (assistant)

Legend

- (C) Team captain
- (CI) Commissioner's Cup Import
- (GI) Governors' Cup Import
- (EI) EASL Import
- (DP) Unsigned draft pick
- (FA) Free agent
- (IN) Inactive
- (S) Suspended
- (R) Rookie
- Injured

Roster

== Broadcast notes ==
The Philippine Cup Finals was aired live on RPTV with simulcast on PBA Rush and Pilipinas Live (both in standard and high definition).

The PBA Rush broadcast provided English language coverage of the Finals.

The Pilipinas Live broadcast provided English-Filipino language coverage of the Finals.

Game	RPTV			PBA Rush			Pilipinas Live	
Game	Play-by-play	Analyst(s)	Courtside Reporters	Play-by-play	Analyst	Courtside Reporters	Streaming Hosts	Hosts
Game 1	Charlie Cuna	Andy Jao and Richard del Rosario	Belle Gregorio	Carlo Pamintuan	Mark Molina	Bea Escudero	Jutt Sulit, Denise Tan and Vince Hizon	Ryan Gregorio
Game 2	Sev Sarmenta	Quinito Henson and Andy Jao	Apple David	Andre Co	Eric Reyes	Doreen Suaybaguio	Carlo Pamintuan, Bea Escudero and Aaron Black	Nico Salva
Game 3	Magoo Marjon	Andy Jao and Yeng Guiao	Belle Gregorio	Carlo Pamintuan	Vince Hizon	Pauline Verzosa	Baileys Acot, Rizza Diaz and Gary David	Nico Salva
Game 4	Charlie Cuna	Dominic Uy and Richard del Rosario	Belle Gregorio	Paolo del Rosario	Mark Molina	Doreen Suaybaguio	Carlo Pamintuan and Bea Escudero	Nico Salva
Game 5	Jutt Sulit	Quinito Henson and Yeng Guiao	Apple David	Carlo Pamintuan	Dominic Uy	Bea Escudero		Nico Salva
Game 6	Magoo Marjon	Andy Jao and Dominic Uy	Belle Gregorio	Paolo del Rosario	Mark Molina	Pauline Verzosa		Jolly Escobar

- Additional game 6 crew:
  - Trophy presentation: Jutt Sulit and Bea Escudero
