= Luigi Trillo =

Filipino basketball coach (born 1975)

Meralco Bolts
- Position: Head coach
- League: PBA

Personal information
- Born: July 13, 1975 (age 51) Manila, Philippines

Career information
- College: De La Salle
- Coaching career: 1997–present

Career history

Coaching
- 1999–2004: Adamson
- 1999: Cebu Gems (assistant)
- 2000–2011: Alaska Aces (assistant)
- 2006–2012: Cebuana Lhuillier Gems
- 2007: Philippines (men's 3x3)
- 2011–2014: Alaska Aces
- 2014–2023: Meralco Bolts (assistant)
- 2023–present: Meralco Bolts

Career highlights
- As head coach: 2× PBA champion (2013 Commissioner's, 2024 Philippine); 2× PBA Baby Dalupan Coach of the Year (2013, 2024); As assistant coach: 4× PBA champion (2000 All-Filipino, 2003 Invitational, 2007 Fiesta, 2010 Fiesta)

Luis Antonio Crisostomo Trillo, (born July 13, 1975) better known as Luigi Trillo, is the head coach of Meralco Bolts in the Philippine Basketball Association (PBA).

He was the former head coach of the Alaska Aces, and Cebuana Lhuillier Gems in the PBA D-League.

== Coaching career ==
=== Early years ===
After suiting up for La Salle from 1993 to 1997, Trillo did not play professionally. He first got the offer to coach for a private school for boys called Southridge in 1997.

After Southridge, he became a co-coach with Jorge Gallent in the junior Philippine Basketball League. He then got an offer as an assistant coach for the Cebu Gems in the now-defunct Metropolitan Basketball Association, where he went straight to the finals in his first year.

=== Adamson ===
In 1999, he joined the Adamson Falcons and, at 23 years old, became the youngest head coach in the UAAP at the time. His inexperience showed as the Soaring Falcons did not win a game in his first two seasons with the team at 0-28.Those first two years were really trying times for me because, remember, you're inheriting a team that's in last place and then we had to recruit,", he said as he explained the early parts of his 4 1/2 years with Adamson.

=== Alaska (Cone's assistant) ===
While at Adamson, he was also offered by coach Tim Cone, who was then his neighbor, to be his assistant coach at Alaska, which he accepted. He juggled learning about coaching through the UAAP and with the Alaska franchise. He helped his team to steer 4 championships for the team.

=== Cebuana Lhullier ===
After his stint with Adamson, he became head coach of the Cebuana Lhuillier Gems of the PBL in 2006, and of the PBA D-League in 2011.

=== Alaska ===
In 2012, he left Cebuana and took over the coaching duties of Alaska, replacing Joel Banal. The Elasto Painters spoiled his debut in a score of 107–100 but the Aces recovered and won 104–84 on their game vs. Barako Bull Energy.

During the 2012–13 season (Trillo's first full season), he quite made an impression around the league by battling the eventual champions Talk N' Text Tropang Texters to six games during the 2012–13 PBA Philippine Cup semis. In the 2013 PBA Commissioner's Cup, he helped the Aces win its 14th and final championship in franchise history, the first in the post-Tim Cone era. His team also came within a game of ousting the eventual champion San Mig Coffee Mixers in the quarterfinals of the 2013 PBA Governors Cup. Because of his achievements, he was awarded as the 2012–13 PBA Coach of the Year by the PBA Press Corps.

But two games into the 2014 PBA Governors' Cup, he stepped down as head coach of Alaska.

=== Sabbatical ===
After resigning with Alaska, Trillo was offered by its main rival San Miguel Beermen to be their head coach to replace Biboy Ravanes. But that time the Beermen offered him, Trillo was already talking with the Meralco Bolts.

=== Meralco ===
==== Norman Black's assistant ====
He was hired as an assistant to Norman Black at Meralco.

On July 6, 2022, he was appointed as interim coach while Norman Black was taking a leave. Trillo guided the team into a win against Rain or Shine. On July 31, 2022, he led the Bolts to defeat Barangay Ginebra in Game 3 of the best of three quarterfinals series. This is the first time that the team defeated Ginebra in a playoff series. He coached the team until August 3, 2022, when Black returned from overseas.

==== As head coach ====
On May 8, 2023, he was appointed as head coach while Norman Black was relegated as the team's consultant. In the 2024 PBA Philippine Cup he led the Meralco Bolts to their first ever championship in its franchise history after beating the San Miguel Beermen 4 games to 2.

== Coaching record ==
=== Collegiate record ===
| Season | Team | Elimination round | | | | | Playoffs | | | | |
| Season | Team | GP | W | L | PCT | Finish | GP | W | L | PCT | Results |
|---|---|---|---|---|---|---|---|---|---|---|---|
| 2000 | AdU | 14 | 0 | 14 | .000 | 8th | — | — | — | — | Eliminated |
| 2001 | AdU | 14 | 0 | 14 | .000 | 8th | — | — | — | — | Eliminated |
| 2002 | AdU | 14 | 3 | 11 | .214 | 7th | — | — | — | — | Eliminated |
| 2003 | AdU | 14 | 5 | 9 | .429 | 5th | — | — | — | — | Eliminated |
| 2004 | AdU | 14 | 5 | 9 | .429 | 6th | — | — | — | — | Eliminated |
| Totals | | 70 | 13 | 57 | .185 | | 0 | 0 | 0 | — | 0 championships |

=== PBA record ===
| Season | Conference | Team | Elimination round | | | | | Playoffs | | | | |
| Season | Conference | Team | GP | W | L | PCT | Finish | GP | W | L | PCT | Result |
|---|---|---|---|---|---|---|---|---|---|---|---|---|
| 2011–12 | Governors' Cup | Alaska | 9 | 2 | 7 | .222 | 9th | — | — | — | — | Eliminated |
| 2012–13 | Philippine Cup | Alaska | 14 | 8 | 6 | .571 | 5th | 4 | 2 | 2 | .500 | Semifinals |
| 2012–13 | Commissioner's Cup | Alaska | 13 | 10 | 3 | .786 | 1st | 8 | 7 | 1 | .875 | Champions |
| 2012–13 | Governor's Cup | Alaska | 9 | 4 | 5 | .444 | 7th | 2 | 1 | 1 | .500 | Quarterfinals |
| 2013–14 | Philippine Cup | Alaska | 14 | 5 | 9 | .357 | 8th | 2 | 1 | 1 | .500 | Quarterfinals |
| 2013–14 | Commissioner's Cup | Alaska | 9 | 6 | 3 | .667 | 3rd | 3 | 1 | 2 | .333 | Quarterfinals |
| 2013–14 | Governor's Cup | Alaska | 2 | 1 | 1 | .500 | (resigned) | — | — | — | — | — |
| 2022–23 | Philippine Cup | Meralco | 5 | 4 | 1 | .800 | 5th | 4 | 2 | 2 | .500 | (interim) |
| 2023–24 | Commissioner's | Meralco | 11 | 8 | 3 | .727 | 5th | 2 | 1 | 1 | .500 | Quarterfinals |
| 2023–24 | Philippine | Meralco | 11 | 6 | 5 | .545 | 3rd | 15 | 10 | 5 | .667 | Champions |
| 2024–25 | Governor's Cup | Meralco | 10 | 7 | 3 | .700 | 2nd (G-A) | 3 | 0 | 3 | .000 | Quarterfinals |
| 2024–25 | Commissioner's | Meralco | 12 | 7 | 5 | .583 | 5th | 3 | 1 | 2 | .333 | Quarterfinals |
| 2024–25 | Philippine Cup | Meralco | 11 | 6 | 5 | .545 | 8th | 1 | 0 | 1 | .000 | Quarterfinals |
| 2025–26 | Philippine Cup | Meralco | | | | | | | | | | |
| Career total | | | 130 | 74 | 56 | .569 | Playoff total | 47 | 26 | 21 | .553 | 2 championships |

== Broadcasting ==
Trillo served as an occasional courtside reporter on UAAP broadcast by PTV 4's Silverstar Sports. He also served as a color commentator on PBA games after his resignation on Alaska.

== Personal life ==
Trillo is the son of former Alaska team manager/governor Joaqui Trillo. He is married to TV host and former courtside reporter, Ria Tanjuatco-Trillo. They have four children.
