= Anjo Caram =

Filipino basketball player

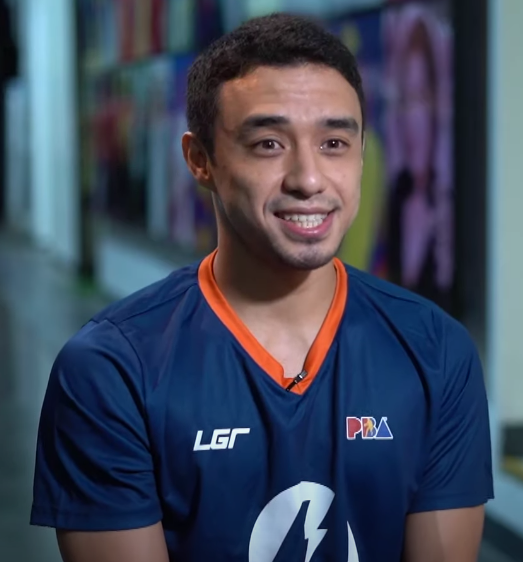
- Caram in 2022

No. 17 – Meralco Bolts
- Position: Point guard
- League: PBA

Personal information
- Born: January 14, 1991 (age 35) Iloilo City, Philippines
- Listed height: 5 ft 7 in (1.70 m)
- Listed weight: 159 lb (72 kg)

Career information
- High school: St. Joseph's (Iloilo City)
- College: San Beda
- PBA draft: 2013: 3rd round, 26th overall pick
- Drafted by: Meralco Bolts
- Playing career: 2013–present

Career history
- 2013–present: Meralco Bolts

Career highlights
- PBA champion (2024 Philippine); 3× NCAA Philippines champion (2010–2012)

Antonio Jose Hechanova Caram (born January 14, 1991) is a Filipino professional basketball player for the Meralco Bolts of the Philippine Basketball Association (PBA). He was drafted in the third round (26th overall) in the 2013 PBA draft by the Bolts.

== College career ==
Caram played college basketball for San Beda Red Lions where he helped the team to win the NCAA Philippines Basketball Championship for four out of his five years in college.

== Professional career ==
=== Meralco Bolts (2013–present) ===
In 2013, Caram was drafted by Meralco Bolts of the Philippine Basketball Association (PBA). In the 2013–14 Philippine Cup, he finished with seven points, three rebounds and three assists, plus a late three-pointer in the fourth that iced the win for Meralco against the Alaska Aces.

In the 2017–18 Philippine Cup, Caram had 16 points in their first game against Barangay Ginebra since their Finals series, where Meralco lost.

In the 2019 Governors' Cup, he became the shortest player to score 30 points in a game, with 16 of those points coming in the fourth quarter. For that performance, he was named Player of the Week. Following that conference, he was signed to a two-year extension.

During the 2023 Governors' Cup, Caram had a season-high 18 points in a win over the Terrafirma Dyip.

== PBA career statistics ==
Legend
GP	Games played	MPG	Minutes per game	FG%	Field-goal percentage
3FG%	3-point field-goal percentage	4P%	4-point field-goal percentage	FT%	Free-throw percentage
RPG	Rebounds per game	APG	Assists per game	SPG	Steals per game
BPG	Blocks per game	PPG	Points per game	127	Career high

As of the end of 2025–26 season

=== Season-by-season averages ===
Year	Team	GP	MPG	FG%	3P%	4P%	FT%	RPG	APG	SPG	BPG	PPG
2013–14	Meralco	22	13.6	.308	.267	—	.708	.9	1.5	.3	—	2.8
2014–15	Meralco	23	12.6	.358	.160	—	.875	1.3	1.0	.4	.1	3.0
2015–16	Meralco	35	12.6	.449	.250	—	.550	.9	1.3	.6	.0	3.4
2016–17	Meralco	44	11.5	.414	.500	—	.667	1.0	1.0	.3	—	3.3
2017–18	Meralco	41	18.6	.476	.170	—	.813	1.3	1.4	.5	.1	6.3
2019	Meralco	40	13.5	.428	.297	—	.762	1.0	1.3	.4	.1	4.1
2020	Meralco	10	5.0	.500	.000	—	—	.3	.2	—	—	1.2
2021	Meralco	34	14.1	.424	.321	—	.667	.9	1.4	.3	.0	4.0
2022–23	Meralco	38	10.2	.451	.474	—	.909	.7	1.0	.1	.0	3.7
2023–24	Meralco	32	13.7	.410	.406	—	.733	.6	1.1	.2	.1	4.2
2024–25	Meralco	31	12.8	.422	.426	.333	.571	1.0	.8	.2	.1	4.7
2025–26	Meralco	10	8.1	.387	.333	.000	—	.3	.4	.2	—	2.9
Career		360	13.0	.426	.343	.308	.726	.9	1.1	.3	.0	3.9

== Player profile ==
Although Caram is mostly a bench player for the Bolts and averages around 4 points a game, he has established himself as one of the team's top perimeter defenders and was hailed by teammate and Philippine national team legend Jimmy Alapag as "one of the best on-ball defenders" in the league. With his decision-making and passing, he can start games whenever a teammate is injured.
