= Paolo Trillo =

Filipino basketball executive and sports announcer

Meralco Bolts
- Position: General manager
- League: PBA

Personal information
- Born: September 8, 1977 (age 49) Manila, Philippines

Career information
- College: Ateneo de Manila University

Career highlights
- As executive: PBA champion (2024 Philippine); 5× UAAP champion (2008–2012); Filoil Flying V Cup champion (2011); 3× PCCL champion (2007, 2009, 2010)

Paolo Crisostomo Trillo, (born September 8, 1977) is a Filipino basketball commentator and executive who is currently the manager of Meralco Bolts.

== Career ==
After graduating in Ateneo, Trillo started working as courtside reporter on PBA on Vintage Sports. Sometimes assigned as a play-by-play, analyst and halftime host. He continued the work until 2004, when he was hired as the general manager of Ateneo basketball team.

After his stint in Ateneo, he was hired to be the manager of Talk 'N Text Tropang Texters. When coaching reshuffling in MVP teams happened, he was assigned with Norman Black in Meralco Bolts.

== Personal life ==
He is the son of former Alaska Aces executive Joaqui Trillo, and brother of Meralco Bolts head coach Luigi Trillo.
