= Chris Banchero =

Filipino-American basketball player

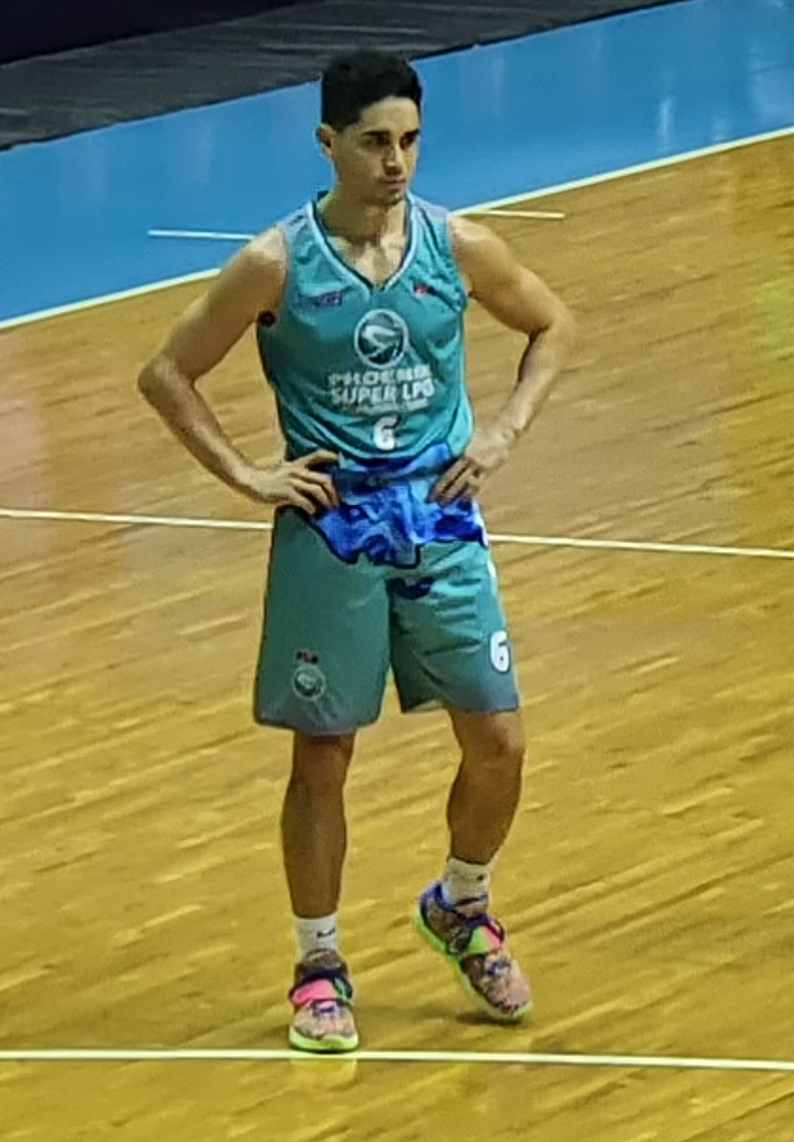
- Chris Banchero playing for the Phoenix Super LPG Fuel Masters in 2021

No. 6 – Meralco Bolts
- Position: Point guard / shooting guard
- League: PBA

Personal information
- Born: January 24, 1989 (age 37) Seattle, Washington, U.S.
- Listed height: 6 ft 1 in (1.85 m)
- Listed weight: 175 lb (79 kg)

Career information
- High school: O'Dea (Seattle, Washington)
- College: Seattle Pacific (2007–2011)
- PBA draft: 2014: 1st round, 5th overall pick
- Drafted by: Alaska Aces
- Playing career: 2012–present

Career history
- 2012–2013: San Miguel Beermen (ABL)
- 2013–2014: Boracay Rum Waves
- 2014–2019: Alaska Aces
- 2019–2020: Magnolia Hotshots
- 2021: Phoenix Super LPG Fuel Masters
- 2022–present: Meralco Bolts

Career highlights
- PBA champion (2024 Philippine); PBA All-Star (2019); PBA All-Rookie Team (2015); ABL champion (2013); ABL Finals MVP (2013); NCAA Division II All-American

Christopher Clark Guerrero Banchero (born January 24, 1989) is a Filipino–American professional basketball player for the Meralco Bolts of the Philippine Basketball Association (PBA). He was drafted fifth overall by Alaska in the 2014 PBA draft.

== High school and college career ==
Banchero was a key player for state 3A champion O'Dea High School, where he averaged 15.1 points for the Fighting Irish, who went 25–5. After his senior year in high school, he committed to play for Seattle Pacific University men's basketball program under coach Ryan Looney.

In his junior year at Seattle Pacific, he was named a Division II All-American, after he led the Falcons with a 19.6-point scoring average that was the second-highest figure in the Great Northwest Athletic Conference. He also led the team to a GNAC Championship and a spot in the NCAA Division II tournament in 2010, after posting a 13–3 GNAC record to capture its first outright league championship since 2006. During his senior year, he posted phenomenal scoring performances of 42, 38, 34, 33, 31, and 30. He was well on his way to being named the D-II National Player of the Year when his senior season was cut short by an ACL injury in January 2011.

He ended his college career as the No. 8 all-time scorer in SPU history. He graduated with a degree of International Communications in Business.

== Professional career ==
=== San Miguel Beermen (ABL) (2011–2013) ===
Banchero was recruited by San Miguel Beermen in the ASEAN Basketball League after graduating in college. The Philippine team already noticed him while playing for SPU's varsity team and for the Italian team in the professional division. At that time, he was gunning for a career in the NBA, trying out his luck in several teams. On May 6, 2012, Banchero recorded 18 points and 15 assists in a 111–104 OT win over the Kuala Lumpur Dragons.

While playing two seasons for the Beermen, he teamed up with Asi Taulava, Eric Menk, June Mar Fajardo, JR Cawaling, and other ex-PBA stars and led the team to the 2013 ABL championship, defeating the Indonesia Warriors. He was also awarded as the Finals MVP.

=== Boracay Rum Waves (PBA D-League) ===
After the ABL season ended in 2013, he set his sights in playing in the PBA. However, PBA rules required Fil-foreign players aged 25 years old or below to play in at least two conferences in the PBA D-League before becoming eligible for the draft. He initially signed a contract with PBA D-League team Blackwater Sports, however, due to a league provision that incoming players must apply through the draft, he ended up being picked top overall and signed to a contract by Boracay Rum Waves. In his D-League debut, he posted an impressive stat line of 15 points, six rebounds, and four assists. His contract with the Tanduay franchise lasted until after the end of the 2014 PBA D-League Foundation Cup.

=== Alaska Aces (2014–2019) ===
After his stint in the D-League, he became eligible for the PBA Draft. During the 2014 PBA draft, he was earlier tipped to go as high as No. 2 in the draft, but some strange twists saw him land at No. 5 overall. He was drafted by Alaska.

On September 9, 2014, he signed a 1-year contract with the Aces. After consecutive finals appearances, Banchero extended his contract for another year in September 2015 in a reported 2.7 million peso deal.

On September 16, 2016, Banchero, again, extended his tenure with the Aces. This time, to a longer three-year deal. Terms were not disclosed. The Fil-Italian cager stated that it was an "easy decision" stating "he is very happy with Alaska." He credited the coaching staff and his teammates as the main reason he stayed with the team and hopes he will finish his career with Alaska.

=== Magnolia Hotshots (2019–2020) ===
On November 3, 2019, the Aces traded Banchero to the Magnolia Hotshots for Rodney Brondial and Robert Herndon.

=== Phoenix Super LPG Fuel Masters (2021) ===
On February 17, 2021, Banchero, along with 2021 first-round pick and 2021 second-round pick, was traded to the Phoenix Super LPG Fuel Masters for Calvin Abueva and 2021 first-round pick. On February 1, 2022, Banchero became an unrestricted free agent.

=== Meralco Bolts (2022–present) ===
On February 2, 2022, Banchero signed a three-year contract with the Meralco Bolts. He first rejected a new three-year contract extension with former team Phoenix before signing with Meralco.

On August 18, 2024, Banchero became the first PBA player to make a four-point shot in an official PBA game during a win over Magnolia.

== Career statistics ==
=== ABL ===
Legend
GP	Games played	MPG	Minutes per game	FG%	Field-goal percentage
3FG%	3-point field-goal percentage	4P%	4-point field-goal percentage	FT%	Free-throw percentage
RPG	Rebounds per game	APG	Assists per game	SPG	Steals per game
BPG	Blocks per game	PPG	Points per game	127	Career high

Year	Team	GP	MPG	FG%	3P%	FT%	RPG	APG	SPG	BPG	PPG
2011–12	San Miguel	11	27.6	.509	.182	.619	2.3	6.6	3.1	.0	12.7
2012–13	San Miguel	23	28.7	.417	.292	.691	2.8	3.9	2.1	.0	14.9

=== PBA ===
As of the end of 2025–26 season

==== Season-by-season averages ====
Year	Team	GP	MPG	FG%	3P%	4P%	FT%	RPG	APG	SPG	BPG	PPG
2014–15	Alaska	58	20.2	.406	.150	—	.657	3.3	2.2	.8	—	7.0
2015–16	Alaska	60	22.7	.459	.364	—	.687	3.5	2.6	.9	—	9.6
2016–17	Alaska	25	25.5	.406	.270	—	.672	3.2	4.1	.8	.2	9.1
2017–18	Alaska	44	30.3	.448	.327	—	.677	4.2	5.9	1.2	.1	12.1
2019	Alaska	38	30.8	.400	.313	—	.683	4.3	4.9	.8	.0	13.3
2019	Magnolia	38	30.8	.400	.313	—	.683	4.3	4.9	.8	.0	13.3
2020	Magnolia	12	26.4	.403	.233	—	.587	2.9	3.5	.8	.1	10.8
2021	Phoenix	33	27.4	.431	.270	—	.636	3.2	3.5	.9	—	10.7
2021	Meralco	33	27.4	.431	.270	—	.636	3.2	3.5	.9	—	10.7
2022–23	Meralco	45	23.8	.392	.314	—	.636	2.4	3.2	.7	.0	7.5
2023–24	Meralco	36	27.7	.422	.319	—	.676	3.7	3.4	.6	—	11.6
2024–25	Meralco	32	29.1	.476	.283	.313	.600	3.1	3.4	.4	—	13.8
2025–26	Meralco	47	22.0	.396	.200	.274	.560	2.2	2.7	.4	—	8.0
Career		430	25.4	.424	.296	.287	.651	3.3	3.5	.8	.0	10.0

== Personal life ==
Banchero was born in Seattle, Washington to a Filipino mother, Jacqueline Guerrero, and a father of Italian descent. His paternal cousin, Paolo Banchero, was the first overall pick of the 2022 NBA draft and plays for the Orlando Magic. They both won championships at O'Dea High School.
