= 2024–25 Barangay Ginebra San Miguel season =

- Head coach: Tim Cone
- General manager: Alfrancis Chua; Raymond Rodriguez (assistant)
- Owners: Ginebra San Miguel, Inc. (a San Miguel Corporation subsidiary)

Governors' Cup results
- Record: 6–4 (60%)
- Place: 3rd in group B
- Playoff finish: Runner-up (lost to TNT, 2–4)

Commissioner's Cup results
- Record: 8–4 (66.7%)
- Place: 4th
- Playoff finish: Runner-up (lost to TNT, 3–4)

Philippine Cup results
- Record: 8–3 (72.7%)
- Place: 4th
- Playoff finish: Semifinalist (lost to San Miguel, 3–4)

Barangay Ginebra San Miguel seasons

The 2024–25 Barangay Ginebra San Miguel season was the 45th season of the franchise in the Philippine Basketball Association (PBA).

== Key dates ==
- July 14: The PBA season 49 draft was held at the Glorietta Activity Center in Makati.

== Draft picks ==
Round	Pick	Player	Position	Place of birth	College
1	3	RJ Abarrientos	G	Philippines	FEU
2	17	Didat Hanapi	G	Philippines	Adamson
2	22	Paolo Hernandez	G	Philippines	Mapúa
3	34	Paul Garcia	G	USA	Ateneo

== Roster ==
2024–25 Barangay Ginebra San Miguel roster
Players
Coaches

Pos.	#	POB	Name	Height	Weight	DOB (YYYY–MM–DD)	From
G	00	(United States)	Maverick Ahanmisi	6 ft 2 in (1.88 m)	190 lb (86 kg)	1991–07–17	Minnesota
F/C	1	(Philippines)	Troy Rosario	6 ft 7 in (2.01 m)	218 lb (99 kg)	1992–01–20	National-U
F	2	(United States)	Jeremiah Gray	6 ft 5 in (1.96 m)	205 lb (93 kg)	1996–08–16	Dominican (CA)
F	3	(United States)	Jamie Malonzo	6 ft 6 in (1.98 m)	210 lb (95 kg)	1996–07–31	De La Salle
G	4	(Philippines)	RJ Abarrientos (R)	5 ft 11 in (1.80 m)	174 lb (79 kg)	1999–09–14	Far Eastern
G	5	(Philippines)	LA Tenorio	5 ft 9 in (1.75 m)	151 lb (68 kg)	1984–07–09	Ateneo
G	6	(United States)	Paul Garcia (R / FA)	5 ft 11 in (1.80 m)	170 lb (77 kg)	1999–06–04	Ateneo
G	9	(Philippines)	Scottie Thompson	6 ft 1 in (1.85 m)	180 lb (82 kg)	1993–07–12	UPHSD
G	10	(Philippines)	John Pinto	5 ft 11 in (1.80 m)	170 lb (77 kg)	1990–10–15	Arellano
F/C	11	(Philippines)	Isaac Go (injured)	6 ft 7 in (2.01 m)	230 lb (104 kg)	1996–06–07	Ateneo
G/F	14	(United States)	Stephen Holt	6 ft 4 in (1.93 m)	195 lb (88 kg)	1991–12–06	Saint Mary's
F	18	(Philippines)	Ralph Cu	6 ft 4 in (1.93 m)	210 lb (95 kg)	1997–03–08	De La Salle
G/F	19	(Philippines)	Von Pessumal (FA)	6 ft 2 in (1.88 m)	185 lb (84 kg)	1993–02–12	Ateneo
F	22	(United States)	Jared Dillinger (IN)	6 ft 4 in (1.93 m)	220 lb (100 kg)	1984–01–06	Hawaiʻi
F/C	23	(Philippines)	Raymond Aguilar	6 ft 4 in (1.93 m)	200 lb (91 kg)	1985–07–27	National-U
G/F	24	(Philippines)	Jayson David	6 ft 3 in (1.91 m)	191 lb (87 kg)	1996–11–08	Lyceum
C	25	(Philippines)	Japeth Aguilar (C)	6 ft 9 in (2.06 m)	235 lb (107 kg)	1987–01–25	Western Kentucky
F	31	(Philippines)	Aljon Mariano	6 ft 3 in (1.91 m)	175 lb (79 kg)	1992–08–03	UST
F	32	(United States)	Justin Brownlee (CI / GI)	6 ft 6 in (1.98 m)	220 lb (100 kg)	1988–04–23	St. John's
C	88	(Philippines)	Ben Adamos	6 ft 7 in (2.01 m)	200 lb (91 kg)	1995–12–30	UPHSD

Head coach

- (United States) Tim Cone

Assistant coach(es)

- (Philippines) Richard del Rosario (1st assistant)
- (United States) Kirk Collier
- (Philippines) Patrick Partosa
- (Philippines) Olsen Racela
- (Philippines) LA Tenorio

Team manager

- (Philippines) Alfrancis Chua^{[a]}
- (Philippines) Raymond Rodriguez (assistant)

Legend

- (C) Team captain
- (CI) Commissioner's Cup Import
- (GI) Governors' Cup Import
- (EI) EASL Import
- (DP) Unsigned draft pick
- (FA) Free agent
- (IN) Inactive
- (S) Suspended
- (R) Rookie
- Injured

Roster

- ^{a} Also serves as Barangay Ginebra's board governor.

== Governors' Cup ==
=== Eliminations ===
==== Group B Standings ====
Pos	Team	W	L	PCT	GB	Qualification
1	Rain or Shine Elasto Painters	7	3	.700	—	Quarterfinals
2	San Miguel Beermen	6	4	.600 (Note: Head-to-head record: San Miguel 1–1 Barangay Ginebra (San Miguel 1.23, Barangay Ginebra 0.82))	1	Quarterfinals
3	Barangay Ginebra San Miguel	6	4	.600	1	Quarterfinals
4	NLEX Road Warriors	5	5	.500 (Note: Head-to-head record: NLEX 1–1 Blackwater (NLEX 1.03, Blackwater 0.97))	2	Quarterfinals
5	Blackwater Bossing	5	5	.500	2	
6	Phoenix Fuel Masters	1	9	.100	6	

Source: PBA.ph
Rules for classification: 1) winning percentage; 2) if two teams are tied, head-to-head record, if three or more teams are tied, head-to-head goal average (quotient); 3) overall quotient; 4) coin toss

==== Game log ====
2024 PBA Governors' Cup game log
Total: 6–4
August: 1–2

Game	Date	Opponent	Score	High points	High rebounds	High assists	Location Attendance	Record
1	August 24	Rain or Shine	L 64–73	Japeth Aguilar (20)	Scottie Thompson (15)	Scottie Thompson (5)	Candon City Arena	0–1
2	August 27	San Miguel	W 108–102	Justin Brownlee (51)	Justin Brownlee (13)	Stephen Holt (8)	Smart Araneta Coliseum	1–1
3	August 30	Blackwater	L 88–95	Justin Brownlee (37)	Japeth Aguilar (11)	Scottie Thompson (7)	Ninoy Aquino Stadium	1–2

September: 5–2

Game	Date	Opponent	Score	High points	High rebounds	High assists	Location Attendance	Record
4	September 3	NLEX	W 119–91	Stephen Holt (26)	Stephen Holt (11)	Justin Brownlee (9)	Smart Araneta Coliseum	2–2
5	September 6	Phoenix	W 110–101	Japeth Aguilar (31)	Justin Brownlee (12)	Justin Brownlee (10)	Ninoy Aquino Stadium	3–2
6	September 10	Blackwater	W 112–98	Scottie Thompson (21)	Scottie Thompson (10)	Scottie Thompson (11)	Ninoy Aquino Stadium	4–2
7	September 13	Rain or Shine	W 124–102	Justin Brownlee (40)	Justin Brownlee (10)	Scottie Thompson (8)	Smart Araneta Coliseum	5–2
8	September 15	San Miguel	L 82–131	RJ Abarrientos (19)	Justin Brownlee (11)	Justin Brownlee (6)	Smart Araneta Coliseum	5–3
9	September 18	Phoenix	W 112–96	RJ Abarrientos (24)	Japeth Aguilar (8)	Justin Brownlee (9)	Ninoy Aquino Stadium	6–3
10	September 22	NLEX	L 99–103 (OT)	Justin Brownlee (26)	Justin Brownlee (12)	Stephen Holt (8)	Smart Araneta Coliseum	6–4

=== Playoffs ===
==== Bracket ====
Quarterfinals (Best-of-5)
A1	TNT	3
B4	NLEX	1
B1	Rain or Shine	3
A4	Magnolia	2
B2	San Miguel	3
A3	Converge	2
A2	Meralco	0
B3	Barangay Ginebra	3

Semifinals (Best-of-7)
A1	TNT	4
B1	Rain or Shine	1
B2	San Miguel	2
B3	Barangay Ginebra	4

Finals (Best-of-7)
A1	TNT	4
B3	Barangay Ginebra	2

==== Game log ====
2024 PBA Governors' Cup playoffs game log
Total: 9–6
Quarterfinals: 3–0

Game	Date	Opponent	Score	High points	High rebounds	High assists	Location Attendance	Series
1	September 26	Meralco	W 99–92	Justin Brownlee (29)	Justin Brownlee (13)	Justin Brownlee (7)	Ninoy Aquino Stadium	1–0
2	September 28	Meralco	W 104–103	Justin Brownlee (39)	Justin Brownlee (7)	Justin Brownlee (5)	Smart Araneta Coliseum	2–0
3	September 30	Meralco	W 113–106	Justin Brownlee (23)	Japeth Aguilar (8)	RJ Abarrientos (6)	Ninoy Aquino Stadium	3–0

Semifinals: 4–2

Game	Date	Opponent	Score	High points	High rebounds	High assists	Location Attendance	Series
1	October 9	San Miguel	W 122–105	Justin Brownlee (33)	Brownlee, Holt (8)	Scottie Thompson (10)	PhilSports Arena	1–0
2	October 11	San Miguel	L 125–131 (OT)	Justin Brownlee (39)	Justin Brownlee (15)	Scottie Thompson (10)	Smart Araneta Coliseum	1–1
3	October 13	San Miguel	W 99–94	Justin Brownlee (30)	Maverick Ahanmisi (11)	Stephen Holt (7)	Dasmariñas Arena	2–1
4	October 16	San Miguel	L 121–131	Justin Brownlee (49)	Justin Brownlee (9)	Scottie Thompson (8)	Smart Araneta Coliseum	2–2
5	October 18	San Miguel	W 121–92	RJ Abarrientos (28)	Justin Brownlee (9)	Brownlee, Cu (7)	Ynares Center; 10,039	3–2
6	October 20	San Miguel	W 102–99	Maverick Ahanmisi (25)	Scottie Thompson (14)	Justin Brownlee (7)	Smart Araneta Coliseum	4–2

Finals: 2–4

Game	Date	Opponent	Score	High points	High rebounds	High assists	Location Attendance	Series
1	October 27	TNT	L 88–104	Justin Brownlee (23)	Stephen Holt 8	Brownlee, Cu, Thompson (6)	Ynares Center; 11,021	0–1
2	October 30	TNT	L 84–96	Justin Brownlee (19)	Brownlee, Thompson (9)	RJ Abarrientos (5)	Smart Araneta Coliseum	0–2
3	November 1	TNT	W 85–73	Justin Brownlee (18)	Justin Brownlee (13)	Aguilar, Brownlee, Thompson (4)	Smart Araneta Coliseum; 11,320	1–2
4	November 3	TNT	W 106–92	Justin Brownlee (34)	Maverick Ahanmisi (8)	Brownlee, Thompson (4)	Smart Araneta Coliseum; 16,783	2–2
5	November 6	TNT	L 72–99	Tenorio, Thompson (13)	Justin Brownlee (10)	Justin Brownlee (3)	Smart Araneta Coliseum; 12,727	2–3
6	November 8	TNT	L 85–95	RJ Abarrientos (31)	Scottie Thompson (10)	Scottie Thompson (5)	Smart Araneta Coliseum; 14,668	2–4

== Commissioner's Cup ==
=== Eliminations ===
==== Standings ====
Pos	Team	W	L	PCT	GB	Qualification
1	NorthPort Batang Pier	9	3	.750	—	Twice-to-beat in the quarterfinals
2	TNT Tropang Giga	8	4	.667 (Note: Head-to-head quotient: TNT 1.04, Converge 1.03, Barangay Ginebra 0.94)	1	Twice-to-beat in the quarterfinals
3	Converge FiberXers	8	4	.667	1	Best-of-three quarterfinals
4	Barangay Ginebra San Miguel	8	4	.667	1	Best-of-three quarterfinals
5	Meralco Bolts	7	5	.583 (Note: Head-to-head quotient: Meralco 1.08, Rain or Shine 1.04, Eastern 0.88)	2	Best-of-three quarterfinals
6	Rain or Shine Elasto Painters	7	5	.583	2	Best-of-three quarterfinals
7	Eastern (G)	7	5	.583	2	Twice-to-win in the quarterfinals
8	Magnolia Chicken Timplados Hotshots	6	6	.500 (Note: Eighth seed playoff: Magnolia 112–81 NLEX)	3	Twice-to-win in the quarterfinals
9	NLEX Road Warriors	6	6	.500	3	
10	San Miguel Beermen	5	7	.417	4	
11	Blackwater Bossing	3	9	.250 (Note: Head-to-head record: Blackwater 1–0 Phoenix)	6	
12	Phoenix Fuel Masters	3	9	.250	6	
13	Terrafirma Dyip	1	11	.083	8	

Source: PBA.ph
Rules for classification: 1) winning percentage; 2) if two teams are tied, head-to-head record; if three or more teams are tied, head-to-head goal average (quotient); if tied for 8th, one-game playoff; 3) overall quotient; 4) coin toss
(G) Guests

==== Game log ====
2024–25 PBA Commissioner's Cup game log
Total: 8–4
December: 4–2

Game	Date	Opponent	Score	High points	High rebounds	High assists	Location Attendance	Record
1	December 11, 2024	NLEX	W 109–100	Stephen Holt (26)	Justin Brownlee (12)	Scottie Thompson (13)	Ninoy Aquino Stadium	1–0
2	December 13, 2024	Phoenix	W 94–72	Scottie Thompson (17)	Brownlee, Holt (7)	Justin Brownlee (7)	Ninoy Aquino Stadium	2–0
3	December 15, 2024	Eastern	L 90–93	Japeth Aguilar (26)	Justin Brownlee (12)	Scottie Thompson (10)	Ynares Center	2–1
4	December 18, 2024	Terrafirma	W 114–98	Justin Brownlee (49)	Justin Brownlee (12)	Scottie Thompson (8)	Ninoy Aquino Stadium	3–1
5	December 21, 2024	Converge	L 91–98	Justin Brownlee (39)	Justin Brownlee (10)	Scottie Thompson (6)	Batangas City Sports Center	3–2
6	December 25, 2024	Magnolia	W 95–92	Justin Brownlee (28)	Troy Rosario (8)	Scottie Thompson (6)	Smart Araneta Coliseum; 12,198	4–2

January: 4–2

Game	Date	Opponent	Score	High points	High rebounds	High assists	Location Attendance	Record
7	January 5, 2025	San Miguel	W 93–81	Troy Rosario (22)	Scottie Thompson (12)	Scottie Thompson (11)	Smart Araneta Coliseum	5–2
8	January 8, 2025	NorthPort	L 116–119	Justin Brownlee (23)	Justin Brownlee (12)	Ahanmisi, Holt (5)	PhilSports Arena	5–3
9	January 12, 2025	Blackwater	W 86–63	Justin Brownlee (18)	Aguilar, Brownlee, Rosario (7)	Scottie Thompson (6)	Ynares Center	6–3
10	January 17, 2025	TNT	L 86–91	Justin Brownlee (20)	Justin Brownlee (16)	Scottie Thompson (7)	PhilSports Arena	6–4
11	January 22, 2025	Rain or Shine	W 120–92	Justin Brownlee (29)	Justin Brownlee (13)	Scottie Thompson (8)	Ynares Center	7–4
12	January 29, 2025	Meralco	W 91–87	RJ Abarrientos (17)	Troy Rosario (6)	Justin Brownlee (5)	Smart Araneta Coliseum	8–4

=== Playoffs ===
==== Bracket ====
Quarterfinals
(#1 twice-to-beat)
1	NorthPort	113
8	Magnolia	110
(Best-of-3)
4	Barangay Ginebra	2
5	Meralco	1
(#2 twice-to-beat)
2	TNT	109
7	Eastern	93
(Best-of-3)
3	Converge	1
6	Rain or Shine	2

Semifinals (Best-of-7)
1	NorthPort	1
4	Barangay Ginebra	4
2	TNT	4
6	Rain or Shine	1

Finals (Best-of-7)
4	Barangay Ginebra	3
2	TNT	4

==== Game log ====
2024–25 PBA Commissioner's Cup playoffs game log
Total: 9–6
Quarterfinals: 2–1

Game	Date	Opponent	Score	High points	High rebounds	High assists	Location Attendance	Series
1	February 5, 2025	Meralco	W 100–92	Brownlee, Thompson (23)	Aguilar, Brownlee (9)	Abarrientos, Thompson (6)	Smart Araneta Coliseum	1–0
2	February 7, 2025	Meralco	L 104–108	Justin Brownlee (36)	Rosario, Thompson (9)	Justin Brownlee (4)	Ninoy Aquino Stadium	1–1
3	February 9, 2025	Meralco	W 94–87	Justin Brownlee (25)	Justin Brownlee (10)	Justin Brownlee (7)	Ynares Center	2–1

Semifinals: 4–1

Game	Date	Opponent	Score	High points	High rebounds	High assists	Location Attendance	Series
1	February 26, 2025	NorthPort	W 115–93	Justin Brownlee (19)	Troy Rosario (8)	RJ Abarrientos (7)	Smart Araneta Coliseum	1–0
2	February 28, 2025	NorthPort	W 119–106	Japeth Aguilar (31)	Stephen Holt (10)	Justin Brownlee (11)	PhilSports Arena	2–0
3	March 2, 2025	NorthPort	W 127–100	Jamie Malonzo (25)	Brownlee, Malonzo (8)	RJ Abarrientos (10)	Smart Araneta Coliseum	3–0
4	March 5, 2025	NorthPort	L 103–108	Abarrientos, Brownlee (18)	Troy Rosario (13)	Scottie Thompson (8)	Smart Araneta Coliseum	3–1
5	March 7, 2025	NorthPort	W 126–99	Justin Brownlee (21)	Justin Brownlee (11)	RJ Abarrientos (10)	Smart Araneta Coliseum	4–1

Finals: 3–4

Game	Date	Opponent	Score	High points	High rebounds	High assists	Location Attendance	Series
1	March 14	TNT	L 89–95	Justin Brownlee (28)	Justin Brownlee (15)	Scottie Thompson (7)	SM Mall of Asia Arena; 11,802	0–1
2	March 16	TNT	W 71–70	Justin Brownlee (35)	Scottie Thompson (12)	Scottie Thompson (7)	SM Mall of Asia Arena; 12,925	1–1
3	March 19	TNT	L 85–87	Justin Brownlee (19)	Scottie Thompson (8)	Justin Brownlee (6)	PhilSports Arena	1–2
4	March 21	TNT	W 95–78	Jamie Malonzo (24)	Justin Brownlee (12)	Justin Brownlee (5)	Ynares Center	2–2
5	March 23	TNT	W 73–66	Justin Brownlee (18)	Justin Brownlee (14)	Brownlee, Thompson (5)	Smart Araneta Coliseum; 12,447	3–2
6	March 26	TNT	L 83–87	Justin Brownlee (22)	Brownlee, Malonzo (7)	Jamie Malonzo (5)	Smart Araneta Coliseum; 17,654	3–3
7	March 28	TNT	L 83–87 (OT)	Justin Brownlee (28)	Japeth Aguilar (11)	Scottie Thompson (8)	Smart Araneta Coliseum; 21,274	3–4

== Philippine Cup ==
=== Eliminations ===
==== Standings ====
Pos	Team	W	L	PCT	GB	Qualification
1	San Miguel Beermen	8	3	.727 (Note: Head-to-head quotient: San Miguel 1.06, NLEX 1.01, Magnolia 0.97, Barangay Ginebra 0.96)	—	Twice-to-beat in the quarterfinals
2	NLEX Road Warriors	8	3	.727	—	Twice-to-beat in the quarterfinals
3	Magnolia Chicken Timplados Hotshots	8	3	.727	—	Twice-to-beat in the quarterfinals
4	Barangay Ginebra San Miguel	8	3	.727	—	Twice-to-beat in the quarterfinals
5	Converge FiberXers	7	4	.636	1	Twice-to-win in the quarterfinals
6	TNT Tropang 5G	6	5	.545 (Note: Head-to-head quotient: TNT 1.13, Rain or Shine 1.02, Meralco 0.87)	2	Twice-to-win in the quarterfinals
7	Rain or Shine Elasto Painters	6	5	.545	2	Twice-to-win in the quarterfinals
8	Meralco Bolts	6	5	.545	2	Twice-to-win in the quarterfinals
9	Phoenix Fuel Masters	4	7	.364	4	
10	Blackwater Bossing	2	9	.182 (Note: Head-to-head record: Blackwater 1–0 NorthPort)	6	
11	NorthPort Batang Pier	2	9	.182	6	
12	Terrafirma Dyip	1	10	.091	7	

Source: PBA.ph
Rules for classification: 1) winning percentage; 2) if two teams are tied, head-to-head record; if three or more teams are tied, head-to-head goal average (quotient); if tied for 8th, one-game playoff; 3) overall quotient; 4) coin toss

==== Game log ====
2025 PBA Philippine Cup game log
Total: 8–3
April: 2–1

Game	Date	Opponent	Score	High points	High rebounds	High assists	Location Attendance	Record
1	April 23	Terrafirma	W 101–80	Japeth Aguilar (30)	Scottie Thompson (13)	Abarrientos, Thompson (7)	Smart Araneta Coliseum	1–0
2	April 25	San Miguel	L 93–104	Troy Rosario (24)	Troy Rosario (8)	Scottie Thompson (6)	Smart Araneta Coliseum	1–1
3	April 30	NorthPort	W 131–106	RJ Abarrientos (27)	Jamie Malonzo (12)	RJ Abarrientos (8)	PhilSports Arena	2–1

May: 3–2

Game	Date	Opponent	Score	High points	High rebounds	High assists	Location Attendance	Record
4	May 7	NLEX	L 86–89	Stephen Holt (21)	Japeth Aguilar (9)	Scottie Thompson (4)	Ninoy Aquino Stadium	2–2
5	May 10	Converge	W 85–66	Japeth Aguilar (23)	Aguilar, Malonzo (10)	Holt, Malonzo (5)	Bren Z. Guiao Convention Center	3–2
6	May 16	Phoenix	W 119–112	RJ Abarrientos (25)	Japeth Aguilar (7)	Scottie Thompson (13)	PhilSports Arena	4–2
7	May 23	Blackwater	W 101–99	Japeth Aguilar (22)	Jamie Malonzo (14)	Scottie Thompson (10)	PhilSports Arena	5–2
8	May 30	Meralco	L 73–82	Malonzo, Thompson (16)	Troy Rosario (10)	Scottie Thompson (3)	Smart Araneta Coliseum	5–3

June: 3–0

Game	Date	Opponent	Score	High points	High rebounds	High assists	Location Attendance	Record
9	June 1	Magnolia	W 85–81	Japeth Aguilar (17)	Aguilar, Thompson (11)	RJ Abarrientos (6)	Smart Araneta Coliseum	6–3
10	June 8	TNT	W 97–78	RJ Abarrientos (23)	Japeth Aguilar (14)	Scottie Thompson (10)	Ninoy Aquino Stadium	7–3
11	June 15	Rain or Shine	W 98–80	Stephen Holt (27)	Stephen Holt (12)	Malonzo, Thompson (5)	Ynares Center	8–3

=== Playoffs ===
==== Bracket ====
Quarterfinals (Top 4 twice-to-beat)
1	San Miguel	108
8	Meralco	97
4	Barangay Ginebra	88
5	Converge	80
2	NLEX	89	92
7	Rain or Shine	92	103
3	Magnolia	88	79
6	TNT	89	80

Semifinals (Best-of-7)
1	San Miguel	4
4	Barangay Ginebra	3
7	Rain or Shine	2
6	TNT	4

Finals (Best-of-7)
1	San Miguel	4
6	TNT	2

==== Game log ====
2025 PBA Philippine Cup playoffs game log
Total: 4–4
Quarterfinals: 1–0

Game	Date	Opponent	Score	High points	High rebounds	High assists	Location Attendance	Series
1	June 20	Converge	W 88–80	RJ Abarrientos (21)	Japeth Aguilar (13)	RJ Abarrientos (4)	Ninoy Aquino Stadium	1–0

Semifinals: 3–4

Game	Date	Opponent	Score	High points	High rebounds	High assists	Location Attendance	Series
1	June 25	San Miguel	W 73–71	Japeth Aguilar (18)	Aguilar, Rosario (9)	RJ Abarrientos (7)	SM Mall of Asia Arena	1–0
2	June 27	San Miguel	L 83–100	Stephen Holt (17)	Scottie Thompson (6)	Abarrientos, Aguilar (6)	Ninoy Aquino Stadium	1–1
3	June 29	San Miguel	W 100–90	RJ Abarrientos (24)	RJ Abarrientos (9)	RJ Abarrientos (8)	Smart Araneta Coliseum	2–1
4	July 2	San Miguel	L 82–107	Troy Rosario (14)	Aguilar, Rosario (7)	Scottie Thompson (4)	SM Mall of Asia Arena	2–2
5	July 4	San Miguel	L 92–103	Maverick Ahanmisi (19)	Troy Rosario (16)	Abarrientos, Malonzo (4)	Smart Araneta Coliseum	2–3
6	July 6	San Miguel	W 88–87	Scottie Thompson (17)	Scottie Thompson (16)	Scottie Thompson (8)	Smart Araneta Coliseum	3–3
7	July 9	San Miguel	L 93–100	Jamie Malonzo (22)	Aguilar, Thompson (7)	Scottie Thompson (8)	Smart Araneta Coliseum; 12,279	3–4

== Transactions ==
=== Free agency ===
==== Signings ====
Player	Date signed	Contract amount	Contract length	Former team	Ref.
Joe Devance	September 24, 2024	Not disclosed	Not disclosed	Retired (Note: Last played for the Barangay Ginebra San Miguel in 2022)	
Troy Rosario	November 25, 2024	Not disclosed	3 years	Blackwater Bossing	
Aljon Mariano	January 10, 2025	Not disclosed	2 years	Re-signed	

==== Subtractions ====
Player	Number	Position	Reason	New team	Ref.
Donald Gumaru	20	Point guard	Released	Pampanga Giant Lanterns (MPBL)	
David Murrell	4	Small forward	Released		
Joe Devance	38	Power forward / Center	Retiring		

=== Trades ===
==== Pre-season ====
July
July 13, 2024	To Barangay Ginebra Isaac Go; Stephen Holt; 2024 Terrafirma first-round pick	To Terrafirma Stanley Pringle; Christian Standhardinger; 2024 Barangay Ginebra first-round pick
July 15, 2024	To Barangay Ginebra Ben Adamos	To NorthPort Sidney Onwubere
July 17, 2024	To Barangay Ginebra 2025 Terrafirma second-round pick	To Terrafirma Didat Hanapi; Paolo Hernandez

=== Recruited imports ===
Tournament	Name	Debuted	Last game	Record	Ref.
Governors' Cup	Justin Brownlee	August 24, 2024 (vs. Rain or Shine)	November 8, 2024 (vs. TNT)	15–10	
Commissioner's Cup	Justin Brownlee	December 11, 2024 (vs. NLEX)	March 28, 2025 (vs. TNT)	17–10	

== Awards ==
Recipient	Award	Date awarded	Reference
RJ Abarrientos	2024–25 PBA Rookie of the Year	October 5, 2025	
Recipient	Honors	Date awarded	Reference
Japeth Aguilar	2024–25 PBA Mythical Second Team	October 5, 2025	
Scottie Thompson	2024–25 PBA Mythical Second Team	October 5, 2025	
Stephen Holt	2024–25 PBA All-Defensive Team	October 5, 2025	
RJ Abarrientos	2024–25 PBA All-Rookie Team	October 13, 2025	
