= 2024–25 Blackwater Bossing season =

- Head coach: Jeffrey Cariaso
- General manager: Johnson Martinez; Rhona Tibor (assistant)
- Owner: Ever Bilena Cosmetics, Inc.

Governors' Cup results
- Record: 5–5 (50%)
- Place: 5th in group B
- Playoff finish: Did not qualify

Commissioner's Cup results
- Record: 3–9 (25%)
- Place: 11th
- Playoff finish: Did not qualify

Philippine Cup results
- Record: 2–9 (18.2%)
- Place: 10th
- Playoff finish: Did not qualify

Blackwater Bossing seasons

The 2024–25 Blackwater Bossing season was the 10th season of the franchise in the Philippine Basketball Association (PBA).

== Key dates ==
- July 14: The PBA season 49 draft was held at the Glorietta Activity Center in Makati.

== Draft picks ==
Round	Pick	Player	Position	Place of birth	College
1	2	Sedrick Barefield	G	USA	Utah
3	26	DJ Mitchell	G	USA	Hartford
4	37	Keith Pido	G	Philippines	Perpetual

== Roster ==
2024–25 Blackwater Bossing roster
Players
Coaches

Pos.	#	POB	Name	Height	Weight	DOB (YYYY–MM–DD)	From
G	0	(Philippines)	RK Ilagan	5 ft 7 in (1.70 m)	150 lb (68 kg)	1997–04–03	San Sebastian
F/C	1	(Philippines)	Abu Tratter	6 ft 5 in (1.96 m)	215 lb (98 kg)	1993–01–09	De La Salle
G	2	(United States)	Sedrick Barefield (R)	6 ft 2 in (1.88 m)	190 lb (86 kg)	1996–11–18	Utah
F/C	4	(Philippines)	Prince Caperal	6 ft 7 in (2.01 m)	230 lb (104 kg)	1993–06–12	Arellano
G/F	5	(Philippines)	Jaydee Tungcab (injured)	6 ft 3 in (1.91 m)	196 lb (89 kg)	1997–05–05	Philippines
G	6	(Philippines)	JVee Casio	5 ft 10 in (1.78 m)	175 lb (79 kg)	1986–09–01	De La Salle
F/C	8	(Philippines)	Bradwyn Guinto	6 ft 6 in (1.98 m)	220 lb (100 kg)	1991–10–20	San Sebastian
G/F	10	(Hong Kong)	BJ Andrade	6 ft 1 in (1.85 m)	180 lb (82 kg)	1996–07–26	Ateneo
F	12	(Philippines)	Miguel Corteza (R)	6 ft 4 in (1.93 m)		1998–02–23	St. Benilde
C	13	(Philippines)	Clifford Jopia	6 ft 8 in (2.03 m)	220 lb (100 kg)	1998–05–11	San Beda
F	14	(Philippines)	Troy Mallillin	6 ft 4 in (1.93 m)	190 lb (86 kg)	1999–01–04	Ateneo
G	15	(Philippines)	Kib Montalbo	6 ft 0 in (1.83 m)	155 lb (70 kg)	1996–04–02	De La Salle
C	18	(Philippines)	Justin Chua	6 ft 6 in (1.98 m)	232 lb (105 kg)	1989–07–13	Ateneo
G	22	(United States)	DJ Mitchell (R)	6 ft 0 in (1.83 m)	160 lb (73 kg)	1999–09–29	Hartford
F	23	(Philippines)	Richard Escoto	6 ft 3 in (1.91 m)	204 lb (93 kg)	1997–03–21	Far Eastern
F	25	(Canada)	Christian David	6 ft 6 in (1.98 m)	215 lb (98 kg)	1998–06–19	Butler
F/C	27	(Philippines)	Jewel Ponferada (injured)	6 ft 5 in (1.96 m)	211 lb (96 kg)	1988–07–08	National-U
G	28	(Philippines)	Mike Ayonayon	6 ft 0 in (1.83 m)	170 lb (77 kg)	1992–12–08	Philippine Christian
F	33	(United States)	Tyrus Hill	6 ft 5 in (1.96 m)	185 lb (84 kg)	1996–03–20	De La Salle

Head coach

- (United States) Jeffrey Cariaso

Assistant coach(es)

- (Philippines) Joe Silva (1st assistant)
- (Philippines) Junjie Ablan
- (Philippines) Ryan Alba
- (Philippines) Patrick Aquino
- (United States) Mike Cortez
- (Philippines) Aries Dimaunahan
- (Philippines) Daniel Olan

Team manager

- (Philippines) Johnson Martinez
- (Philippines) Rhona Tibor (assistant)

Legend

- (C) Team captain
- (CI) Commissioner's Cup Import
- (GI) Governors' Cup Import
- (EI) EASL Import
- (DP) Unsigned draft pick
- (FA) Free agent
- (IN) Inactive
- (S) Suspended
- (R) Rookie
- Injured

Roster

== Governors' Cup ==
=== Eliminations ===
==== Group B Standings ====
Pos	Team	W	L	PCT	GB	Qualification
1	Rain or Shine Elasto Painters	7	3	.700	—	Quarterfinals
2	San Miguel Beermen	6	4	.600 (Note: Head-to-head record: San Miguel 1–1 Barangay Ginebra (San Miguel 1.23, Barangay Ginebra 0.82))	1	Quarterfinals
3	Barangay Ginebra San Miguel	6	4	.600	1	Quarterfinals
4	NLEX Road Warriors	5	5	.500 (Note: Head-to-head record: NLEX 1–1 Blackwater (NLEX 1.03, Blackwater 0.97))	2	Quarterfinals
5	Blackwater Bossing	5	5	.500	2	
6	Phoenix Fuel Masters	1	9	.100	6	

Source: PBA.ph
Rules for classification: 1) winning percentage; 2) if two teams are tied, head-to-head record, if three or more teams are tied, head-to-head goal average (quotient); 3) overall quotient; 4) coin toss

==== Game log ====
2024 PBA Governors' Cup game log
Total: 5–5
August: 1–3

Game	Date	Opponent	Score	High points	High rebounds	High assists	Location Attendance	Record
1	August 20	Rain or Shine	L 97–110	Sedrick Barefield (18)	Ricky Ledo (8)	Jaydee Tungcab (5)	Smart Araneta Coliseum	0–1
2	August 22	NLEX	L 87–104	David, Rosario (17)	Christian David (10)	Sedrick Barefield (5)	Smart Araneta Coliseum	0–2
3	August 25	San Miguel	L 108–128	Troy Rosario (25)	Christian David (8)	James Kwekuteye (6)	Smart Araneta Coliseum	0–3
4	August 30	Barangay Ginebra	W 95–88	George King (33)	George King (19)	Casio, Ilagan, King (4)	Ninoy Aquino Stadium	1–3

September: 4–2

Game	Date	Opponent	Score	High points	High rebounds	High assists	Location Attendance	Record
5	September 3	Phoenix	W 123–111	George King (44)	George King (13)	Barefield, Ilagan (5)	Smart Araneta Coliseum	2–3
6	September 6	NLEX	W 110–99	George King (39)	George King (15)	Barefield, King (5)	Ninoy Aquino Stadium	3–3
7	September 10	Barangay Ginebra	L 98–112	George King (21)	George King (11)	George King (8)	Ninoy Aquino Stadium	3–4
8	September 15	Phoenix	L 114–119	George King (32)	George King (10)	George King (6)	Smart Araneta Coliseum	3–5
9	September 21	San Miguel	W 111–94	George King (49)	George King (11)	RK Ilagan (7)	Ninoy Aquino Stadium	4–5
10	September 23	Rain or Shine	W 139–118	George King (64)	George King (13)	Sedrick Barefield (4)	Ninoy Aquino Stadium	5–5

== Commissioner's Cup ==
=== Eliminations ===
==== Standings ====
Pos	Team	W	L	PCT	GB	Qualification
1	NorthPort Batang Pier	9	3	.750	—	Twice-to-beat in the quarterfinals
2	TNT Tropang Giga	8	4	.667 (Note: Head-to-head quotient: TNT 1.04, Converge 1.03, Barangay Ginebra 0.94)	1	Twice-to-beat in the quarterfinals
3	Converge FiberXers	8	4	.667	1	Best-of-three quarterfinals
4	Barangay Ginebra San Miguel	8	4	.667	1	Best-of-three quarterfinals
5	Meralco Bolts	7	5	.583 (Note: Head-to-head quotient: Meralco 1.08, Rain or Shine 1.04, Eastern 0.88)	2	Best-of-three quarterfinals
6	Rain or Shine Elasto Painters	7	5	.583	2	Best-of-three quarterfinals
7	Eastern (G)	7	5	.583	2	Twice-to-win in the quarterfinals
8	Magnolia Chicken Timplados Hotshots	6	6	.500 (Note: Eighth seed playoff: Magnolia 112–81 NLEX)	3	Twice-to-win in the quarterfinals
9	NLEX Road Warriors	6	6	.500	3	
10	San Miguel Beermen	5	7	.417	4	
11	Blackwater Bossing	3	9	.250 (Note: Head-to-head record: Blackwater 1–0 Phoenix)	6	
12	Phoenix Fuel Masters	3	9	.250	6	
13	Terrafirma Dyip	1	11	.083	8	

Source: PBA.ph
Rules for classification: 1) winning percentage; 2) if two teams are tied, head-to-head record; if three or more teams are tied, head-to-head goal average (quotient); if tied for 8th, one-game playoff; 3) overall quotient; 4) coin toss
(G) Guests

==== Game log ====
2024–25 PBA Commissioner's Cup game log
Total: 3–9
November: 0–2

Game	Date	Opponent	Score	High points	High rebounds	High assists	Location Attendance	Record
1	November 28, 2024	Magnolia	L 100–118	George King (42)	George King (12)	Barefield, Kwekuteye (3)	Ninoy Aquino Stadium	0–1
2	November 30, 2024	NLEX	L 95–107	George King (40)	King, Tungcab (8)	RK Ilagan (5)	Ynares Center	0–2

December: 1–3

Game	Date	Opponent	Score	High points	High rebounds	High assists	Location Attendance	Record
3	December 10, 2024	Eastern	L 75–84	George King (41)	George King (12)	Justin Chua (4)	Filoil EcoOil Centre	0–3
4	December 12, 2024	Meralco	W 114–98	Sedrick Barefield (33)	George King (14)	Sedrick Barefield (9)	Ninoy Aquino Stadium	1–3
5	December 15, 2024	San Miguel	L 102–115	George King (40)	Christian David (8)	RK Ilagan (7)	Ynares Center	1–4
6	December 19, 2024	TNT	L 93–109	George King (28)	George King (9)	RK Ilagan (5)	Ninoy Aquino Stadium	1–5

January: 2–4

Game	Date	Opponent	Score	High points	High rebounds	High assists	Location Attendance	Record
7	January 8, 2025	Rain or Shine	L 106–122	George King (35)	George King (12)	George King (4)	PhilSports Arena	1–6
8	January 12, 2025	Barangay Ginebra	L 63–86	George King (27)	David, Jopia (9)	Ayonayon, Ponferada (3)	Ynares Center	1–7
9	January 15, 2025	Terrafirma	W 96–86	George King (26)	Chua, King (12)	Jaydee Tungcab (5)	Ninoy Aquino Stadium	2–7
10	January 19, 2025	Converge	L 109–127	George King (34)	George King (13)	George King (6)	Ynares Center	2–8
11	January 21, 2025	Phoenix	W 100–92	Justin Chua (22)	Christian David (12)	JVee Casio (5)	Ynares Center	3–8
12	January 25, 2025	NorthPort	L 93–120	Justin Chua (15)	Justin Chua (8)	Chua, Tungcab (3)	Ynares Center	3–9

== Philippine Cup ==
=== Eliminations ===
==== Standings ====
Pos	Team	W	L	PCT	GB	Qualification
1	San Miguel Beermen	8	3	.727 (Note: Head-to-head quotient: San Miguel 1.06, NLEX 1.01, Magnolia 0.97, Barangay Ginebra 0.96)	—	Twice-to-beat in the quarterfinals
2	NLEX Road Warriors	8	3	.727	—	Twice-to-beat in the quarterfinals
3	Magnolia Chicken Timplados Hotshots	8	3	.727	—	Twice-to-beat in the quarterfinals
4	Barangay Ginebra San Miguel	8	3	.727	—	Twice-to-beat in the quarterfinals
5	Converge FiberXers	7	4	.636	1	Twice-to-win in the quarterfinals
6	TNT Tropang 5G	6	5	.545 (Note: Head-to-head quotient: TNT 1.13, Rain or Shine 1.02, Meralco 0.87)	2	Twice-to-win in the quarterfinals
7	Rain or Shine Elasto Painters	6	5	.545	2	Twice-to-win in the quarterfinals
8	Meralco Bolts	6	5	.545	2	Twice-to-win in the quarterfinals
9	Phoenix Fuel Masters	4	7	.364	4	
10	Blackwater Bossing	2	9	.182 (Note: Head-to-head record: Blackwater 1–0 NorthPort)	6	
11	NorthPort Batang Pier	2	9	.182	6	
12	Terrafirma Dyip	1	10	.091	7	

Source: PBA.ph
Rules for classification: 1) winning percentage; 2) if two teams are tied, head-to-head record; if three or more teams are tied, head-to-head goal average (quotient); if tied for 8th, one-game playoff; 3) overall quotient; 4) coin toss

==== Game log ====
2025 PBA Philippine Cup game log
Total: 2–9
April: 1–2

Game	Date	Opponent	Score	High points	High rebounds	High assists	Location Attendance	Record
1	April 5	Magnolia	L 84–106	Christian David (31)	Christian David (5)	Sedrick Barefield (7)	Ninoy Aquino Stadium	0–1
2	April 13	Converge	L 80–111	RK Ilagan (19)	Bradwyn Guinto (10)	Jaydee Tungcab (3)	Ninoy Aquino Stadium	0–2
3	April 25	NorthPort	W 120–98	Sedrick Barefield (20)	David, Escoto (6)	RK Ilagan (8)	Smart Araneta Coliseum	1–2

May: 0–5

Game	Date	Opponent	Score	High points	High rebounds	High assists	Location Attendance	Record
4	May 2	NLEX	L 72–80	BJ Andrade (15)	Richard Escoto (7)	JVee Casio (3)	Ynares Center II	1–3
5	May 7	Rain or Shine	L 106–120	Christian David (28)	David, Mallillin (8)	Bradwyn Guinto (4)	Ninoy Aquino Stadium	1–4
6	May 21	Meralco	L 85–103	Christian David (24)	Christian David (10)	Bradwyn Guinto (5)	Ynares Center	1–5
7	May 23	Barangay Ginebra	L 99–101	Sedrick Barefield (32)	Christian David (8)	Sedrick Barefield (6)	PhilSports Arena	1–6
8	May 25	San Miguel	L 78–115	Christian David (15)	Jopia, Mallillin (7)	David, Ilagan (5)	PhilSports Arena	1–7

June: 1–2

Game	Date	Opponent	Score	High points	High rebounds	High assists	Location Attendance	Record
9	June 6	TNT	L 82–108	Barefield, David (13)	Christian David (13)	Abu Tratter (3)	Ninoy Aquino Stadium	1–8
10	June 8	Terrafirma	W 97–82	Richard Escoto (21)	Christian David (12)	Sedrick Barefield (8)	Ninoy Aquino Stadium	2–8
11	June 13	Phoenix	L 109–124	Richard Escoto (20)	Bradwyn Guinto (5)	RK Ilagan (9)	Ninoy Aquino Stadium	2–9

== Transactions ==
=== Free agency ===
==== Signings ====
Player	Date signed	Contract amount	Contract length	Former team	Ref.
Bradwyn Guinto	June 8, 2024	Not disclosed	2 years	Re-signed	
Jaydee Tungcab	June 8, 2024	Not disclosed	2 years	Re-signed	
Troy Mallillin	February 24, 2025	Not disclosed	Not disclosed	San Miguel Beermen	
Prince Caperal	March 18, 2025	Not disclosed	Not disclosed	Zamboanga Valientes (Dubai International Basketball Championship)	

==== Subtractions ====
Player	Number	Position	Reason	New team	Ref.
Troy Rosario	18	Power forward	End of contract; did not agree to term extension	Barangay Ginebra San Miguel	
Mike DiGregorio	1	Shooting guard	Moving to MPBL	Pangasinan Heatwaves (MPBL)	

=== Trades ===
==== Pre-season ====
July
July 2, 2024	To Blackwater Kib Montalbo; Jewel Ponferada; 2028 TNT second-round pick	To TNT Rey Nambatac
July 17, 2024	To Blackwater Miguel Corteza	To Rain or Shine 2026 Blackwater second-round pick (from TNT)

==== Mid-season ====
February
February 17, 2025	To Blackwater BJ Andrade	To Converge Rey Suerte

==== Philippine Cup ====
April
April 23, 2025	To Blackwater Abu Tratter	To NorthPort James Kwekuteye

=== Recruited imports ===
Tournament	Name	Debuted	Last game	Record	Ref.
Governors' Cup	Ricky Ledo	August 20, 2024 (vs. Rain or Shine)	August 22, 2024 (vs. NLEX)	0–2	
Governors' Cup	George King	August 30, 2024 (vs. Barangay Ginebra)	September 23, 2024 (vs. Rain or Shine)	5–2	
Commissioner's Cup	George King	November 28, 2024 (vs. Magnolia)	January 19, 2025 (vs. Converge)	2–8	

== Awards ==
Recipient	Honors	Date awarded	Reference
Sedrick Barefield	2024–25 PBA All-Rookie Team	October 13, 2025	
