= 2024–25 Converge FiberXers season =

- Head coach: Franco Atienza (interim)
- General manager: Jacob Lao; Dennis Pineda (assistant)
- Owner: Converge ICT Solutions, Inc.

Governors' Cup results
- Record: 6–4 (60%)
- Place: 3rd in group A
- Playoff finish: Quarterfinalist (lost to San Miguel, 2–3)

Commissioner's Cup results
- Record: 8–4 (66.7%)
- Place: 3rd
- Playoff finish: Quarterfinalist (lost to Rain or Shine, 1–2)

Philippine Cup results
- Record: 7–4 (63.6%)
- Place: 5th
- Playoff finish: Quarterfinalist (lost to Barangay Ginebra with twice-to-win disadvantage)

Converge FiberXers seasons

The 2024–25 Converge FiberXers season was the 3rd season of the franchise in the Philippine Basketball Association (PBA).

== Key dates ==
- July 14: The PBA season 49 draft was held at the Glorietta Activity Center in Makati.

== Draft picks ==
Round	Pick	Player	Position	Place of birth	College
1	1	Justine Baltazar	C/F	Philippines	De La Salle
2	19	Paolo Javillonar	C/F	Philippines	Letran
2	21	Ben Phillips	F	USA	De La Salle
2	24	Jason Credo	F	Philippines	Ateneo
3	25	Ronan Santos	C	Philippines	Arellano

== Roster ==
2024–25 Converge FiberXers roster
Players
Coaches

Pos.	#	POB	Name	Height	Weight	DOB (YYYY–MM–DD)	From
F	0	(Thailand)	Inand Fornilos	6 ft 2 in (1.88 m)	195 lb (88 kg)		Ateneo
F	1	(Philippines)	Jackson Corpuz	6 ft 4 in (1.93 m)	195 lb (88 kg)	1989–02–08	Philippine Christian
G/F	4	(Philippines)	Rey Suerte	6 ft 3 in (1.91 m)	175 lb (79 kg)	1994–10–04	UE
G/F	8	(United States)	Schonny Winston	6 ft 4 in (1.93 m)	190 lb (86 kg)	1998–07–22	De La Salle
F/C	9	(Philippines)	Paolo Javillonar (R)	6 ft 6 in (1.98 m)		2000–05–13	Letran
G	11	(Philippines)	MJ Garcia (R)	6 ft 0 in (1.83 m)		1998–11–25	SPCF
G	12	(United States)	Alec Stockton	6 ft 2 in (1.88 m)	170 lb (77 kg)	1998–06–24	Far Eastern
C	15	(Philippines)	Justin Arana	6 ft 7 in (2.01 m)	231 lb (105 kg)	1999–03–21	Arellano
F	16	(Philippines)	Kevin Racal (C)	6 ft 3 in (1.91 m)	175 lb (79 kg)	1991–05–16	Letran
F/C	18	(Philippines)	Jeo Ambohot	6 ft 7 in (2.01 m)	193 lb (88 kg)	1996–11–18	Letran
F/C	19	(Philippines)	Justine Baltazar (R)	6 ft 9 in (2.06 m)	250 lb (113 kg)	1997–02–19	De La Salle
F	21	(United States)	Kamron Vigan-Fleming (FA)	6 ft 5 in (1.96 m)	183 lb (83 kg)	1998–12–23	Bethesda
G	23	(Philippines)	JL delos Santos	5 ft 11 in (1.80 m)	176 lb (80 kg)	1999–09–12	José Rizal
C	24	(Philippines)	Ronan Santos (R)	6 ft 7 in (2.01 m)		1997–03–24	Arellano
F	26	(Philippines)	Bryan Santos	6 ft 5 in (1.96 m)	209 lb (95 kg)	1997–05–26	UST
F	27	(Philippines)	King Caralipio	6 ft 2 in (1.88 m)	176 lb (80 kg)	1997–12–04	Letran
F	29	(Philippines)	Jhan Nermal	6 ft 3 in (1.91 m)	172 lb (78 kg)	1993–05–19	STI WNU
G	–	(Philippines)	Gelo Alolino	6 ft 0 in (1.83 m)	185 lb (84 kg)	1994–01–04	National-U
F/C	–	(New Zealand)	Patrick Maagdenberg (injured)	6 ft 5 in (1.96 m)	242 lb (110 kg)	1997–04–25	Ateneo

Head coach

- (Philippines) Franco Atienza (interim)

Assistant coach(es)

- (Philippines) Dennis Pineda (1st assistant)
- (Philippines) Manny Dandan
- (Philippines) Danny Ildefonso
- (Philippines) Chico Manabat
- (Philippines) Willie Miller
- (Philippines) Karl Santos
- (Serbia) Rajko Toroman (active consultant)

Team manager

- (Philippines) Jacob Lao

Legend

- (C) Team captain
- (CI) Commissioner's Cup Import
- (GI) Governors' Cup Import
- (EI) EASL Import
- (DP) Unsigned draft pick
- (FA) Free agent
- (IN) Inactive
- (S) Suspended
- (R) Rookie
- Injured

Roster

== Governors' Cup ==
=== Eliminations ===
==== Group A Standings ====
Pos	Team	W	L	PCT	GB	Qualification
1	TNT Tropang Giga	8	2	.800	—	Quarterfinals
2	Meralco Bolts	7	3	.700	1	Quarterfinals
3	Converge FiberXers	6	4	.600	2	Quarterfinals
4	Magnolia Chicken Timplados Hotshots	5	5	.500	3	Quarterfinals
5	NorthPort Batang Pier	3	7	.300	5	
6	Terrafirma Dyip	1	9	.100	7	

Source: PBA.ph
Rules for classification: 1) winning percentage; 2) if two teams are tied, head-to-head record, if three or more teams are tied, head-to-head goal average (quotient); 3) overall quotient; 4) coin toss

==== Game log ====
2024 PBA Governors' Cup game log
Total: 6–4
August: 2–2

Game	Date	Opponent	Score	High points	High rebounds	High assists	Location Attendance	Record
1	August 21	Terrafirma	W 127–95	Scotty Hopson (46)	Scotty Hopson (8)	JL delos Santos (6)	Smart Araneta Coliseum	1–0
2	August 23	Magnolia	L 93–105	Scotty Hopson (26)	Scotty Hopson (8)	Hopson, Stockton (5)	Smart Araneta Coliseum	1–1
3	August 27	TNT	W 96–95	Scotty Hopson (32)	Hopson, Stockton (10)	Arana, Hopson (4)	Smart Araneta Coliseum	2–1
4	August 29	NorthPort	L 109–135	Scotty Hopson (24)	Scotty Hopson (10)	Scotty Hopson (7)	Ninoy Aquino Stadium	2–2

September: 4–2

Game	Date	Opponent	Score	High points	High rebounds	High assists	Location Attendance	Record
5	September 4	Meralco	L 88–116	Scotty Hopson (33)	Bryan Santos (8)	Hopson, Santos (6)	Smart Araneta Coliseum	2–3
6	September 8	TNT	L 91–98	Justin Arana (16)	Schonny Winston (13)	Scotty Hopson (5)	Ninoy Aquino Stadium	2–4
7	September 11	NorthPort	W 107–99	Alec Stockton (21)	Scotty Hopson (14)	Scotty Hopson (6)	Ninoy Aquino Stadium	3–4
8	September 14	Terrafirma	W 100–99	Schonny Winston (19)	Scotty Hopson (9)	JL delos Santos (6)	Ninoy Aquino Stadium	4–4
9	September 18	Meralco	W 105–97	Jalen Jones (32)	Alec Stockton (11)	Alec Stockton (5)	Ninoy Aquino Stadium	5–4
10	September 23	Magnolia	W 89–82	Jalen Jones (27)	Arana, Jones (12)	Jalen Jones (4)	Ninoy Aquino Stadium	6–4

=== Playoffs ===
==== Bracket ====
Quarterfinals (Best-of-5)
A1	TNT	3
B4	NLEX	1
B1	Rain or Shine	3
A4	Magnolia	2
B2	San Miguel	3
A3	Converge	2
A2	Meralco	0
B3	Barangay Ginebra	3

Semifinals (Best-of-7)
A1	TNT	4
B1	Rain or Shine	1
B2	San Miguel	2
B3	Barangay Ginebra	4

Finals (Best-of-7)
A1	TNT	4
B3	Barangay Ginebra	2

==== Game log ====
2024 PBA Governors' Cup playoffs game log
Total: 2–3
Quarterfinals: 2–3

Game	Date	Opponent	Score	High points	High rebounds	High assists	Location Attendance	Series
1	September 26	San Miguel	L 95–102	Jalen Jones (22)	Jalen Jones (12)	Jalen Jones (4)	Ninoy Aquino Stadium	0–1
2	September 28	San Miguel	L 100–107	Jalen Jones (36)	Jalen Jones (12)	Alex Cabagnot (5)	Smart Araneta Coliseum	0–2
3	September 30	San Miguel	W 114–112	Justin Arana (23)	Jalen Jones (14)	Alec Stockton (8)	Ninoy Aquino Stadium	1–2
4	October 4	San Miguel	W 114–100	Schonny Winston (26)	Justin Arana (8)	Alec Stockton (8)	Ninoy Aquino Stadium	2–2
5	October 6	San Miguel	L 105–109	Jalen Jones (29)	Jalen Jones (17)	Schonny Winston (10)	Ynares Center	2–3

== Commissioner's Cup ==
=== Eliminations ===
==== Standings ====
Pos	Team	W	L	PCT	GB	Qualification
1	NorthPort Batang Pier	9	3	.750	—	Twice-to-beat in the quarterfinals
2	TNT Tropang Giga	8	4	.667 (Note: Head-to-head quotient: TNT 1.04, Converge 1.03, Barangay Ginebra 0.94)	1	Twice-to-beat in the quarterfinals
3	Converge FiberXers	8	4	.667	1	Best-of-three quarterfinals
4	Barangay Ginebra San Miguel	8	4	.667	1	Best-of-three quarterfinals
5	Meralco Bolts	7	5	.583 (Note: Head-to-head quotient: Meralco 1.08, Rain or Shine 1.04, Eastern 0.88)	2	Best-of-three quarterfinals
6	Rain or Shine Elasto Painters	7	5	.583	2	Best-of-three quarterfinals
7	Eastern (G)	7	5	.583	2	Twice-to-win in the quarterfinals
8	Magnolia Chicken Timplados Hotshots	6	6	.500 (Note: Eighth seed playoff: Magnolia 112–81 NLEX)	3	Twice-to-win in the quarterfinals
9	NLEX Road Warriors	6	6	.500	3	
10	San Miguel Beermen	5	7	.417	4	
11	Blackwater Bossing	3	9	.250 (Note: Head-to-head record: Blackwater 1–0 Phoenix)	6	
12	Phoenix Fuel Masters	3	9	.250	6	
13	Terrafirma Dyip	1	11	.083	8	

Source: PBA.ph
Rules for classification: 1) winning percentage; 2) if two teams are tied, head-to-head record; if three or more teams are tied, head-to-head goal average (quotient); if tied for 8th, one-game playoff; 3) overall quotient; 4) coin toss
(G) Guests

==== Game log ====
2024–25 PBA Commissioner's Cup game log
Total: 8–4
November: 1–1

Game	Date	Opponent	Score	High points	High rebounds	High assists	Location Attendance	Record
1	November 27, 2024	Terrafirma	W 116–87	Cheick Diallo (25)	Cheick Diallo (16)	Heading, Winston (6)	PhilSports Arena	1–0
2	November 29, 2024	Eastern	L 106–117	Cheick Diallo (43)	Cheick Diallo (9)	Alec Stockton (8)	Ninoy Aquino Stadium	1–1

December: 5–1

Game	Date	Opponent	Score	High points	High rebounds	High assists	Location Attendance	Record
3	December 1, 2024	Magnolia	W 93–91	Justin Arana (24)	Cheick Diallo (16)	Alec Stockton (10)	Ynares Center	2–1
4	December 12, 2024	NorthPort	L 101–108	Jordan Heading (30)	Cheick Diallo (9)	Jordan Heading (6)	Ninoy Aquino Stadium	2–2
5	December 17, 2024	NLEX	W 102–91	Cheick Diallo (37)	Cheick Diallo (18)	Jordan Heading (11)	Ninoy Aquino Stadium	3–2
6	December 19, 2024	Phoenix	W 116–105	Diallo, Heading (21)	Cheick Diallo (16)	Jordan Heading (6)	Ninoy Aquino Stadium	4–2
7	December 21, 2024	Barangay Ginebra	W 98–91	Alec Stockton (22)	Cheick Diallo (18)	Alec Stockton (8)	Batangas City Sports Center	5–2
8	December 25, 2024	Meralco	W 110–94	Jordan Heading (30)	Cheick Diallo (19)	Jordan Heading (8)	Smart Araneta Coliseum; 12,198	6–2

January: 2–2

Game	Date	Opponent	Score	High points	High rebounds	High assists	Location Attendance	Record
9	January 11, 2025	TNT	L 96–98	Cheick Diallo (37)	Cheick Diallo (15)	Alec Stockton (5)	Ninoy Aquino Stadium	6–3
10	January 14, 2025	Rain or Shine	W 103–96	Alec Stockton (21)	Cheick Diallo (13)	Alec Stockton (5)	Ninoy Aquino Stadium	7–3
11	January 19, 2025	Blackwater	W 127–109	Jordan Heading (22)	Cheick Diallo (18)	Alec Stockton (7)	Ynares Center	8–3
12	January 24, 2025	San Miguel	L 113–116	Cheick Diallo (28)	Justine Baltazar (12)	Alec Stockton (10)	Ynares Center	8–4

=== Playoffs ===
==== Bracket ====
Quarterfinals
(#1 twice-to-beat)
1	NorthPort	113
8	Magnolia	110
(Best-of-3)
4	Barangay Ginebra	2
5	Meralco	1
(#2 twice-to-beat)
2	TNT	109
7	Eastern	93
(Best-of-3)
3	Converge	1
6	Rain or Shine	2

Semifinals (Best-of-7)
1	NorthPort	1
4	Barangay Ginebra	4
2	TNT	4
6	Rain or Shine	1

Finals (Best-of-7)
4	Barangay Ginebra	3
2	TNT	4

==== Game log ====
2024–25 PBA Commissioner's Cup playoffs game log
Total: 1–2
Quarterfinals: 1–2

Game	Date	Opponent	Score	High points	High rebounds	High assists	Location Attendance	Series
1	February 5, 2025	Rain or Shine	W 130–118	Cheick Diallo (35)	Cheick Diallo (17)	Alec Stockton (10)	Smart Araneta Coliseum	1–0
2	February 7, 2025	Rain or Shine	L 104–114	Jordan Heading (29)	Cheick Diallo (15)	Heading, Winston (6)	Ninoy Aquino Stadium	1–1
3	February 9, 2025	Rain or Shine	L 103–112	Alec Stockton (26)	Cheick Diallo (13)	Alec Stockton (6)	Ynares Center	1–2

== Philippine Cup ==
=== Eliminations ===
==== Standings ====
Pos	Team	W	L	PCT	GB	Qualification
1	San Miguel Beermen	8	3	.727 (Note: Head-to-head quotient: San Miguel 1.06, NLEX 1.01, Magnolia 0.97, Barangay Ginebra 0.96)	—	Twice-to-beat in the quarterfinals
2	NLEX Road Warriors	8	3	.727	—	Twice-to-beat in the quarterfinals
3	Magnolia Chicken Timplados Hotshots	8	3	.727	—	Twice-to-beat in the quarterfinals
4	Barangay Ginebra San Miguel	8	3	.727	—	Twice-to-beat in the quarterfinals
5	Converge FiberXers	7	4	.636	1	Twice-to-win in the quarterfinals
6	TNT Tropang 5G	6	5	.545 (Note: Head-to-head quotient: TNT 1.13, Rain or Shine 1.02, Meralco 0.87)	2	Twice-to-win in the quarterfinals
7	Rain or Shine Elasto Painters	6	5	.545	2	Twice-to-win in the quarterfinals
8	Meralco Bolts	6	5	.545	2	Twice-to-win in the quarterfinals
9	Phoenix Fuel Masters	4	7	.364	4	
10	Blackwater Bossing	2	9	.182 (Note: Head-to-head record: Blackwater 1–0 NorthPort)	6	
11	NorthPort Batang Pier	2	9	.182	6	
12	Terrafirma Dyip	1	10	.091	7	

Source: PBA.ph
Rules for classification: 1) winning percentage; 2) if two teams are tied, head-to-head record; if three or more teams are tied, head-to-head goal average (quotient); if tied for 8th, one-game playoff; 3) overall quotient; 4) coin toss

==== Game log ====
2025 PBA Philippine Cup game log
Total: 7–4
April: 4–2

Game	Date	Opponent	Score	High points	High rebounds	High assists	Location Attendance	Record
1	April 4	Meralco	L 89–91	Justin Arana (23)	Justine Baltazar (10)	JL delos Santos (8)	Ninoy Aquino Stadium	0–1
2	April 6	Phoenix	W 92–83	Alec Stockton (18)	Justine Baltazar (16)	Justine Baltazar (6)	Ninoy Aquino Stadium	1–1
3	April 9	Magnolia	L 71–83	Arana, Winston (14)	Justin Arana (14)	Arana, Winston (3)	Rizal Memorial Coliseum	1–2
4	April 13	Blackwater	W 111–80	Justin Arana (19)	Justin Arana (11)	JL delos Santos (8)	Ninoy Aquino Stadium	2–2
5	April 27	TNT	W 100–94	Justin Arana (22)	Justine Baltazar (12)	Justin Arana (5)	Ynares Center	3–2
6	April 30	Rain or Shine	W 107–97	Stockton, Winston (24)	Justine Baltazar (22)	Justin Arana (6)	PhilSports Arena	4–2

May: 2–2

Game	Date	Opponent	Score	High points	High rebounds	High assists	Location Attendance	Record
7	May 10	Barangay Ginebra	L 66–85	Justine Baltazar (13)	Justin Arana (11)	Alec Stockton (4)	Bren Z. Guiao Convention Center	4–3
8	May 16	NorthPort	W 111–92	Alec Stockton (33)	Justin Arana (14)	MJ Garcia (6)	PhilSports Arena	5–3
9	May 23	NLEX	L 83–88	Justine Baltazar (21)	Justin Arana (12)	JL delos Santos (4)	PhilSports Arena	5–4
10	May 28	Terrafirma	W 117–103	King Caralipio (18)	Justin Arana (13)	Baltazar, Stockton (5)	PhilSports Arena	6–4

June: 1–0

Game	Date	Opponent	Score	High points	High rebounds	High assists	Location Attendance	Record
11	June 11	San Miguel	W 100–97	Schonny Winston (25)	Justine Baltazar (12)	Alec Stockton (5)	Ninoy Aquino Stadium	7–4

=== Playoffs ===
==== Bracket ====
Quarterfinals (Top 4 twice-to-beat)
1	San Miguel	108
8	Meralco	97
4	Barangay Ginebra	88
5	Converge	80
2	NLEX	89	92
7	Rain or Shine	92	103
3	Magnolia	88	79
6	TNT	89	80

Semifinals (Best-of-7)
1	San Miguel	4
4	Barangay Ginebra	3
7	Rain or Shine	2
6	TNT	4

Finals (Best-of-7)
1	San Miguel	4
6	TNT	2

==== Game log ====
2025 PBA Philippine Cup playoffs game log
Total: 0–1
Quarterfinals: 0–1

Game	Date	Opponent	Score	High points	High rebounds	High assists	Location Attendance	Series
1	June 20	Barangay Ginebra	L 80–88	Justin Arana (15)	Justine Baltazar (8)	Baltazar, delos Santos, Garcia, Winston (3)	Ninoy Aquino Stadium	0–1

== Transactions ==
=== Free agency ===
==== Signings ====
Player	Date signed	Contract amount	Contract length	Former team	Ref.
Alex Cabagnot	August 5, 2024	Not disclosed	Not disclosed	Taiwan Mustangs (The Asian Tournament)	
Jordan Heading	November 18, 2024	₱200,000 per month	2 years	West Adelaide Bearcats (NBL1 Central)	
MJ Garcia	January 18, 2025	Not disclosed	Not disclosed	Pampanga Giant Lanterns (MPBL)	
Jackson Corpuz	March 14, 2025	Not disclosed	Not disclosed	Magnolia Chicken Timplados Hotshots	
Jhan Nermal	April 2, 2025	Not disclosed	Not disclosed	NLEX Road Warriors	
Kevin Racal	May 5, 2025	Not disclosed	1 year	Re-signed	
Gelo Alolino	June 16, 2025	Not disclosed	1 conference	Terrafirma Dyip	

==== Subtractions ====
Player	Number	Position	Reason	New team	Ref.
Alex Cabagnot	5	Point guard	Retiring / Moving to MPBL	Basilan Viva Portmasters (MPBL)	
Mike Nieto	17, 7	Small forward	Free agent	TNT Tropang 5G	

=== Trades ===
==== Mid-season ====
November
November 12, 2024	To Converge Jordan Heading	To Terrafirma Aljun Melecio; Keith Zaldivar; 2025 Converge first-round pick
February
February 18, 2025	To Converge Rey Suerte	To Blackwater BJ Andrade

==== Philippine Cup ====
June
June 2, 2025	To Converge Mikey Williams	To TNT Jordan Heading

=== Recruited imports ===
Tournament	Name	Debuted	Last game	Record	Ref.
Governors' Cup	Scotty Hopson	August 21, 2024 (vs. Terrafirma)	September 14, 2024 (vs. Terrafirma)	4–4	
Governors' Cup	Jalen Jones	September 18, 2024 (vs. Meralco)	October 6, 2024 (vs. San Miguel)	4–3	
Commissioner's Cup	Cheick Diallo	November 27, 2024 (vs. Terrafirma)	February 9, 2025 (vs. Rain or Shine)	9–6	

== Awards ==
Recipient	Honors	Date awarded	Reference
Justin Arana	2024–25 PBA Mythical Second Team	October 5, 2025	
Justine Baltazar	2024–25 PBA All-Rookie Team	October 13, 2025	
