= 2024–25 NLEX Road Warriors season =

- Head coach: Jong Uichico
- General manager: Virgil Villavicencio
- Owners: Metro Pacific Investments Corporation (an MVP Group subsidiary)

Governors' Cup results
- Record: 5–5 (50%)
- Place: 4th in group B
- Playoff finish: Quarterfinalist (lost to TNT, 1–3)

Commissioner's Cup results
- Record: 6–6 (50%)
- Place: 9th
- Playoff finish: Did not qualify

Philippine Cup results
- Record: 8–3 (72.7%)
- Place: 2nd
- Playoff finish: Quarterfinalist (lost to Rain or Shine with twice-to-beat advantage)

NLEX Road Warriors seasons

The 2024–25 NLEX Road Warriors season was the 10th season of the franchise in the Philippine Basketball Association (PBA).

== Key dates ==
- July 14: The PBA season 49 draft was held at the Glorietta Activity Center in Makati.

== Draft picks ==
Round	Pick	Player	Position	Place of birth	College
1	6	Jonnel Policarpio	F	Philippines	De La Salle
2	18	Brandon Ramirez	F	Canada	York
3	30	Xyrus Torres	G	Philippines	FEU
4	40	Denzel Wong	G	Philippines	Asia Pacific
5	47	Adrian Partosa	F	Philippines	Benilde

== Roster ==
2024–25 NLEX Road Warriors roster
Players
Coaches

Pos.	#	POB	Name	Height	Weight	DOB (YYYY–MM–DD)	From
G/F	1	(New Zealand)	Richie Rodger	6 ft 2 in (1.88 m)	211 lb (96 kg)	1997–01–27	UE
C	2	(Philippines)	Michael Miranda	6 ft 7 in (2.01 m)	210 lb (95 kg)	1990–12–12	San Sebastian
F	4	(Philippines)	Enoch Valdez	6 ft 2 in (1.88 m)	178 lb (81 kg)	2000–05–26	Lyceum
G	7	(Philippines)	Kevin Alas	6 ft 0 in (1.83 m)	175 lb (79 kg)	1991–11–13	Letran
G	8	(Philippines)	Robert Bolick (C)	6 ft 1 in (1.85 m)	178 lb (81 kg)	1995–09–13	San Beda
F	9	(Philippines)	Dominick Fajardo	6 ft 0 in (1.83 m)	220 lb (100 kg)	1993–10–25	Bulacan State
F	10	(Philippines)	Javee Mocon	6 ft 4 in (1.93 m)	189 lb (86 kg)	1995–04–07	San Beda
G/F	11	(United States)	Robbie Herndon	6 ft 3 in (1.91 m)	180 lb (82 kg)	1993–07–16	San Francisco State
G	12	(Philippines)	Matt Nieto	6 ft 1 in (1.85 m)	160 lb (73 kg)	1997–05–31	Ateneo
G	14	(Philippines)	Baser Amer	6 ft 0 in (1.83 m)	170 lb (77 kg)	1992–09–29	San Beda
F/C	15	(Canada)	Brandon Ramirez (R)	6 ft 5 in (1.96 m)			York
F	16	(Philippines)	Jonnel Policarpio (R)	6 ft 5 in (1.96 m)			De La Salle
F/C	18	(Philippines)	JB Bahio (R)	6 ft 5 in (1.96 m)			San Beda
C	20	(Philippines)	Dave Marcelo (IN)	6 ft 5 in (1.96 m)	223 lb (101 kg)	1989–02–22	San Beda
F	22	(Philippines)	Jake Pascual (FA)	6 ft 4 in (1.93 m)	200 lb (91 kg)	1988–11–11	San Beda
F	33	(Australia)	Anthony Semerad	6 ft 4 in (1.93 m)	230 lb (104 kg)	1991–04–25	San Beda
G	77	(Philippines)	Xyrus Torres (R)	6 ft 0 in (1.83 m)		2000–09–23	Far Eastern
F	–	(Canada)	Sean Anthony (IN)	6 ft 4 in (1.93 m)	200 lb (91 kg)	1986–01–26	McGill

Head coach

- (Philippines) Jong Uichico

Assistant coach(es)

- (Philippines) Borgie Hermida (1st assistant)
- (Philippines) Anton Escolin
- (Philippines) Melo Lim
- (Philippines) Emman Monfort
- (Philippines) JB Sison
- (Philippines) Siot Tanquingcen
- (Philippines) Adonis Tierra

Team manager

- (Philippines) Virgil Villavicencio

Legend

- (C) Team captain
- (CI) Commissioner's Cup Import
- (GI) Governors' Cup Import
- (EI) EASL Import
- (DP) Unsigned draft pick
- (FA) Free agent
- (IN) Inactive
- (S) Suspended
- (R) Rookie
- Injured

Roster

== Governors' Cup ==
=== Eliminations ===
==== Group B Standings ====
Pos	Team	W	L	PCT	GB	Qualification
1	Rain or Shine Elasto Painters	7	3	.700	—	Quarterfinals
2	San Miguel Beermen	6	4	.600 (Note: Head-to-head record: San Miguel 1–1 Barangay Ginebra (San Miguel 1.23, Barangay Ginebra 0.82))	1	Quarterfinals
3	Barangay Ginebra San Miguel	6	4	.600	1	Quarterfinals
4	NLEX Road Warriors	5	5	.500 (Note: Head-to-head record: NLEX 1–1 Blackwater (NLEX 1.03, Blackwater 0.97))	2	Quarterfinals
5	Blackwater Bossing	5	5	.500	2	
6	Phoenix Fuel Masters	1	9	.100	6	

Source: PBA.ph
Rules for classification: 1) winning percentage; 2) if two teams are tied, head-to-head record, if three or more teams are tied, head-to-head goal average (quotient); 3) overall quotient; 4) coin toss

==== Game log ====
2024 PBA Governors' Cup game log
Total: 5–5
August: 3–1

Game	Date	Opponent	Score	High points	High rebounds	High assists	Location Attendance	Record
1	August 22	Blackwater	W 104–87	Myke Henry (31)	Myke Henry (10)	Robert Bolick (11)	Smart Araneta Coliseum	1–0
2	August 25	Phoenix	W 100–95	Myke Henry (37)	Myke Henry (9)	Robert Bolick (9)	Smart Araneta Coliseum	2–0
3	August 28	Rain or Shine	L 105–124	Robert Bolick (22)	Fajardo, Henry, Policarpio (6)	Robert Bolick (7)	Ninoy Aquino Stadium	2–1
4	August 31	San Miguel	W 112–108 (OT)	Myke Henry (33)	Robert Bolick (9)	Henry, Rodger (4)	Aquilino Q. Pimentel Jr. International Convention Center	3–1

September: 2–4

Game	Date	Opponent	Score	High points	High rebounds	High assists	Location Attendance	Record
5	September 3	Barangay Ginebra	L 91–119	Robert Bolick (19)	Myke Henry (8)	Myke Henry (7)	Smart Araneta Coliseum	3–2
6	September 6	Blackwater	L 99–110	Myke Henry (26)	Myke Henry (12)	Robert Bolick (9)	Ninoy Aquino Stadium	3–3
7	September 11	San Miguel	L 114–119	Robert Bolick (24)	Robbie Herndon (7)	Robert Bolick (15)	Ninoy Aquino Stadium	3–4
8	September 17	Rain or Shine	L 114–123 (OT)	DeQuan Jones (49)	Bolick, Jones (11)	Robert Bolick (9)	Ninoy Aquino Stadium	3–5
9	September 20	Phoenix	W 104–79	DeQuan Jones (27)	Jonnel Policarpio (10)	Robert Bolick (9)	Ninoy Aquino Stadium	4–5
10	September 22	Barangay Ginebra	W 103–99 (OT)	DeQuan Jones (44)	Jones, Mocon (10)	Robert Bolick (11)	Smart Araneta Coliseum	5–5

=== Playoffs ===
==== Bracket ====
Quarterfinals (Best-of-5)
A1	TNT	3
B4	NLEX	1
B1	Rain or Shine	3
A4	Magnolia	2
B2	San Miguel	3
A3	Converge	2
A2	Meralco	0
B3	Barangay Ginebra	3

Semifinals (Best-of-7)
A1	TNT	4
B1	Rain or Shine	1
B2	San Miguel	2
B3	Barangay Ginebra	4

Finals (Best-of-7)
A1	TNT	4
B3	Barangay Ginebra	2

==== Game log ====
2024 PBA Governors' Cup playoffs game log
Total: 1–3
Quarterfinals: 1–3

Game	Date	Opponent	Score	High points	High rebounds	High assists	Location Attendance	Series
1	September 25	TNT	L 102–107	DeQuan Jones (38)	DeQuan Jones (12)	Robert Bolick (7)	Ninoy Aquino Stadium	0–1
2	September 27	TNT	W 93–90	DeQuan Jones (38)	DeQuan Jones (12)	Robert Bolick (5)	Santa Rosa Sports Complex	1–1
3	September 29	TNT	L 91–109	Robbie Herndon (17)	DeQuan Jones (10)	Robert Bolick (10)	Ynares Center	1–2
4	October 1	TNT	L 96–125	Robert Bolick (25)	Jonnel Policarpio (6)	Robert Bolick (7)	Ninoy Aquino Stadium	1–3

== Commissioner's Cup ==
=== Eliminations ===
==== Standings ====
Pos	Team	W	L	PCT	GB	Qualification
1	NorthPort Batang Pier	9	3	.750	—	Twice-to-beat in the quarterfinals
2	TNT Tropang Giga	8	4	.667 (Note: Head-to-head quotient: TNT 1.04, Converge 1.03, Barangay Ginebra 0.94)	1	Twice-to-beat in the quarterfinals
3	Converge FiberXers	8	4	.667	1	Best-of-three quarterfinals
4	Barangay Ginebra San Miguel	8	4	.667	1	Best-of-three quarterfinals
5	Meralco Bolts	7	5	.583 (Note: Head-to-head quotient: Meralco 1.08, Rain or Shine 1.04, Eastern 0.88)	2	Best-of-three quarterfinals
6	Rain or Shine Elasto Painters	7	5	.583	2	Best-of-three quarterfinals
7	Eastern (G)	7	5	.583	2	Twice-to-win in the quarterfinals
8	Magnolia Chicken Timplados Hotshots	6	6	.500 (Note: Eighth seed playoff: Magnolia 112–81 NLEX)	3	Twice-to-win in the quarterfinals
9	NLEX Road Warriors	6	6	.500	3	
10	San Miguel Beermen	5	7	.417	4	
11	Blackwater Bossing	3	9	.250 (Note: Head-to-head record: Blackwater 1–0 Phoenix)	6	
12	Phoenix Fuel Masters	3	9	.250	6	
13	Terrafirma Dyip	1	11	.083	8	

Source: PBA.ph
Rules for classification: 1) winning percentage; 2) if two teams are tied, head-to-head record; if three or more teams are tied, head-to-head goal average (quotient); if tied for 8th, one-game playoff; 3) overall quotient; 4) coin toss
(G) Guests

==== Game log ====
2024–25 PBA Commissioner's Cup game log
Total: 6–6
November: 1–1

Game	Date	Opponent	Score	High points	High rebounds	High assists	Location Attendance	Record
1	November 28, 2024	NorthPort	L 87–114	Mike Watkins (29)	Mike Watkins (19)	Robert Bolick (9)	Ninoy Aquino Stadium	0–1
2	November 30, 2024	Blackwater	W 107–95	Mike Watkins (26)	Mike Watkins (25)	Robert Bolick (10)	Ynares Center	1–1

December: 2–3

Game	Date	Opponent	Score	High points	High rebounds	High assists	Location Attendance	Record
3	December 3, 2024	Terrafirma	W 104–85	Robert Bolick (32)	Mike Watkins (30)	Robert Bolick (5)	Ninoy Aquino Stadium	2–1
4	December 8, 2024	San Miguel	W 104–99	Robert Bolick (39)	Mike Watkins (28)	Robert Bolick (9)	Ynares Center	3–1
5	December 11, 2024	Barangay Ginebra	L 100–109	Mike Watkins (27)	Mike Watkins (21)	Robert Bolick (7)	Ninoy Aquino Stadium	3–2
6	December 17, 2024	Converge	L 91–102	Mike Watkins (36)	Mike Watkins (23)	Robert Bolick (6)	Ninoy Aquino Stadium	3–3
7	December 20, 2024	Magnolia	L 95–99 (OT)	Robert Bolick (28)	Mike Watkins (23)	Robert Bolick (9)	PhilSports Arena	3–4

January: 3–2

Game	Date	Opponent	Score	High points	High rebounds	High assists	Location Attendance	Record
8	January 10, 2025	Meralco	L 91–105	Mike Watkins (38)	Mike Watkins (21)	Robert Bolick (10)	Ninoy Aquino Stadium	3–5
9	January 15, 2025	TNT	L 87–94	Mike Watkins (33)	Mike Watkins (20)	Bolick, Policarpio (4)	Ninoy Aquino Stadium	3–6
10	January 19, 2025	Phoenix	W 108–94	Robert Bolick (26)	Mike Watkins (18)	Robert Bolick (9)	Ynares Center	4–6
11	January 25, 2025	Rain or Shine	W 122–110	Robert Bolick (40)	Mike Watkins (14)	Robert Bolick (10)	Ynares Center	5–6
12	January 29, 2025	Eastern	W 94–76	Mike Watkins (41)	Mike Watkins (14)	Robert Bolick (8)	Smart Araneta Coliseum	6–6

=== Playoffs ===
==== Bracket ====
Quarterfinals
(#1 twice-to-beat)
1	NorthPort	113
8	Magnolia	110
(Best-of-3)
4	Barangay Ginebra	2
5	Meralco	1
(#2 twice-to-beat)
2	TNT	109
7	Eastern	93
(Best-of-3)
3	Converge	1
6	Rain or Shine	2

Semifinals (Best-of-7)
1	NorthPort	1
4	Barangay Ginebra	4
2	TNT	4
6	Rain or Shine	1

Finals (Best-of-7)
4	Barangay Ginebra	3
2	TNT	4

==== Game log ====
2024–25 PBA Commissioner's Cup playoffs game log
Total: 0–1
8th seed playoff: 0–1

Game	Date	Opponent	Score	High points	High rebounds	High assists	Location Attendance	Series
1	February 2, 2025	Magnolia	L 81–112	Robert Bolick (27)	Mike Watkins (14)	Robert Bolick (6)	Ynares Center	0–1

== Philippine Cup ==
=== Eliminations ===
==== Standings ====
Pos	Team	W	L	PCT	GB	Qualification
1	San Miguel Beermen	8	3	.727 (Note: Head-to-head quotient: San Miguel 1.06, NLEX 1.01, Magnolia 0.97, Barangay Ginebra 0.96)	—	Twice-to-beat in the quarterfinals
2	NLEX Road Warriors	8	3	.727	—	Twice-to-beat in the quarterfinals
3	Magnolia Chicken Timplados Hotshots	8	3	.727	—	Twice-to-beat in the quarterfinals
4	Barangay Ginebra San Miguel	8	3	.727	—	Twice-to-beat in the quarterfinals
5	Converge FiberXers	7	4	.636	1	Twice-to-win in the quarterfinals
6	TNT Tropang 5G	6	5	.545 (Note: Head-to-head quotient: TNT 1.13, Rain or Shine 1.02, Meralco 0.87)	2	Twice-to-win in the quarterfinals
7	Rain or Shine Elasto Painters	6	5	.545	2	Twice-to-win in the quarterfinals
8	Meralco Bolts	6	5	.545	2	Twice-to-win in the quarterfinals
9	Phoenix Fuel Masters	4	7	.364	4	
10	Blackwater Bossing	2	9	.182 (Note: Head-to-head record: Blackwater 1–0 NorthPort)	6	
11	NorthPort Batang Pier	2	9	.182	6	
12	Terrafirma Dyip	1	10	.091	7	

Source: PBA.ph
Rules for classification: 1) winning percentage; 2) if two teams are tied, head-to-head record; if three or more teams are tied, head-to-head goal average (quotient); if tied for 8th, one-game playoff; 3) overall quotient; 4) coin toss

==== Game log ====
2025 PBA Philippine Cup game log
Total: 8–3
April: 2–1

Game	Date	Opponent	Score	High points	High rebounds	High assists	Location Attendance	Record
1	April 5	San Miguel	L 89–98	Michael Miranda (15)	JB Bahio (9)	Robert Bolick (8)	Ninoy Aquino Stadium	0–1
2	April 12	Rain or Shine	W 109–95	Xyrus Torres (28)	Javee Mocon (10)	Robert Bolick (12)	Ninoy Aquino Stadium	1–1
3	April 23	TNT	W 91–74	Bahio, Bolick, Torres (13)	JB Bahio (12)	Robert Bolick (6)	Smart Araneta Coliseum	2–1

May: 4–1

Game	Date	Opponent	Score	High points	High rebounds	High assists	Location Attendance	Record
4	May 2	Blackwater	W 80–72	Robert Bolick (20)	JB Bahio (8)	Robert Bolick (6)	Ynares Center II	3–1
5	May 7	Barangay Ginebra	W 89–86	Robert Bolick (28)	Robert Bolick (7)	JB Bahio (5)	Ninoy Aquino Stadium	4–1
6	May 14	Terrafirma	W 117–87	Brandon Ramirez (21)	Javee Mocon (12)	Robert Bolick (10)	Ninoy Aquino Stadium	5–1
7	May 23	Converge	W 88–83	Robert Bolick (18)	JB Bahio (9)	Robert Bolick (10)	PhilSports Arena	6–1
8	May 25	Meralco	L 92–108	Robert Bolick (22)	Javee Mocon (7)	Robert Bolick (6)	PhilSports Arena	6–2

June: 2–1

Game	Date	Opponent	Score	High points	High rebounds	High assists	Location Attendance	Record
9	June 1	Phoenix	W 105–95	Javee Mocon (23)	Javee Mocon (9)	Robert Bolick (7)	Smart Araneta Coliseum	7–2
10	June 6	Magnolia	W 107–95	Robert Bolick (25)	Bolick, Ramirez (9)	Robert Bolick (5)	Ninoy Aquino Stadium	8–2
11	June 11	NorthPort	L 108–113	Robbie Herndon (21)	JB Bahio (11)	Kevin Alas (6)	Ninoy Aquino Stadium	8–3

=== Playoffs ===
==== Bracket ====
Quarterfinals (Top 4 twice-to-beat)
1	San Miguel	108
8	Meralco	97
4	Barangay Ginebra	88
5	Converge	80
2	NLEX	89	92
7	Rain or Shine	92	103
3	Magnolia	88	79
6	TNT	89	80

Semifinals (Best-of-7)
1	San Miguel	4
4	Barangay Ginebra	3
7	Rain or Shine	2
6	TNT	4

Finals (Best-of-7)
1	San Miguel	4
6	TNT	2

==== Game log ====
2025 PBA Philippine Cup playoffs game log
Total: 0–2
Quarterfinals: 0–2

Game	Date	Opponent	Score	High points	High rebounds	High assists	Location Attendance	Series
1	June 18	Rain or Shine	L 89–92	Xyrus Torres (20)	JB Bahio (14)	Bahio, Bolick, Mocon (3)	PhilSports Arena	0–1
2	June 21	Rain or Shine	L 92–103	Robert Bolick (34)	Mocon, Ramirez (8)	Bolick, Nieto (4)	Ninoy Aquino Stadium	0–2

== Transactions ==
=== Free agency ===
==== Signings ====
Player	Date signed	Contract amount	Contract length	Former team	Ref.
Matt Nieto	May 16, 2024	Not disclosed	2 years	Re-signed	
JB Bahio	November 29, 2024	Not disclosed	Not disclosed	Nueva Ecija Rice Vanguards (MPBL)	
Javee Mocon	May 23, 2025	Not disclosed	1 year	Re-signed	
JB Bahio	June 18, 2025	Not disclosed	2 years	Re-signed	

==== Subtractions ====
Player	Number	Position	Reason	New team	Ref.
Yousef Taha	55	Center	Contract not renewed	Abra Solid North Weavers (MPBL)	
Jhan Nermal	29	Small forward	Free agent	Converge FiberXers	

=== Trades ===
==== Governors' Cup ====
September
September 11, 2024	To NLEX Javee Mocon	To Phoenix Ato Ular 2026 NLEX second-round pick

=== Recruited imports ===
Tournament	Name	Debuted	Last game	Record	Ref.
Governors' Cup	Myke Henry	August 22, 2024 (vs. Blackwater)	September 11, 2024 (vs. San Miguel)	3–4	
Governors' Cup	DeQuan Jones	September 17, 2024 (vs. Rain or Shine)	October 1, 2024 (vs. TNT)	3–4	
Commissioner's Cup	Mike Watkins	November 28, 2024 (vs. NorthPort)	February 2, 2025 (vs. Magnolia)	6–7	

== Awards ==
Recipient	Honors	Date awarded	Reference
Robert Bolick	2024–25 PBA Mythical First Team	October 5, 2025	
