= Jamie Malonzo =

Filipino-American basketball player

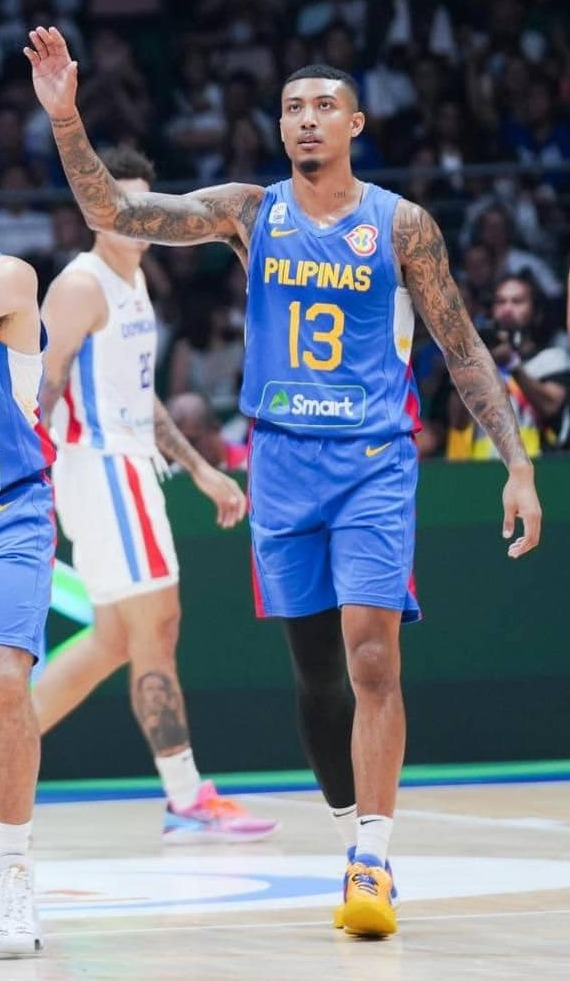
- Malonzo in 2023

No. 13 – Earthfriends Tokyo Z
- Position: Small forward / power forward
- League: B.League

Personal information
- Born: July 31, 1996 (age 30) Seattle, Washington, U.S.
- Listed height: 6 ft 7 in (2.01 m)
- Listed weight: 210 lb (95 kg)

Career information
- High school: O'Dea (Seattle, Washington)
- College: Highline CC (2015–2017); Portland State (2017–2019); De La Salle (2019)
- PBA draft: 2020: 1st round2nd overall (Note: The 2021 draft was composed of two drafts: the Gilas special round, which consists of 4 players reserved for the Gilas Pilipinas program, and the regular draft. Malonzo was selected as the 2nd pick of the regular draft.)
- Drafted by: NorthPort Batang Pier
- Playing career: 2021–present

Career history
- 2021–2022: NorthPort Batang Pier
- 2022–2025: Barangay Ginebra San Miguel
- 2025: Kyoto Hannaryz
- 2026–present: Earthfriends Tokyo Z

Career highlights
- PBA champion (2022–23 Commissioner's); 2× PBA All-Star (2023, 2024); PBA Mythical First Team (2023); PBA All-Rookie Team (2021); UAAP Mythical Team (2019)

Jamie James Malonzo Orme (born July 31, 1996) is a Filipino-American professional basketball player for Earthfriends Tokyo Z of the Japanese B.League. He spent three seasons with the Barangay Ginebra San Miguel of the Philippine Basketball Association (PBA) before signing with the Hannaryz.

== Professional career ==
=== NorthPort Batang Pier (2021–2022) ===
Malonzo was selected second overall by the NorthPort Batang Pier during the PBA season 46 draft.

=== Barangay Ginebra San Miguel (2022–2025) ===
On September 20, 2022, Malonzo was traded to the Barangay Ginebra San Miguel for Prince Caperal, Arvin Tolentino, and a 2022 first-round pick.

On March 10, 2024, Malonzo tore his calf muscle during the 2024 PBA Philippine Cup quarterfinals at the Rizal Memorial Coliseum. He successfully underwent calf-achilles surgery but the recuperation period is from six to eight weeks.

=== Kyoto Hannaryz (2025) ===
In July 2025, Malonzo signed with the Kyoto Hannaryz of the Japanese B.League. On October 17, his contract with the team was terminated.

== National team career ==
Malonzo is eligible to play for the Philippines national team as a local under FIBA eligibility rules since he acquired his Philippine passport at the age of eight.

He was included in the 21-man pool for the 2023 FIBA World Cup, where he was eventually included in the final 12-man lineup.

== PBA career statistics ==
Legend
GP	Games played	MPG	Minutes per game	FG%	Field-goal percentage
3FG%	3-point field-goal percentage	4P%	4-point field-goal percentage	FT%	Free-throw percentage
RPG	Rebounds per game	APG	Assists per game	SPG	Steals per game
BPG	Blocks per game	PPG	Points per game	127	Career high

As of the end of 2024–25 season

=== Season-by-season averages ===
Year	Team	GP	MPG	FG%	3P%	4P%	FT%	RPG	APG	SPG	BPG	PPG
2021	NorthPort	25	34.8	.442	.298	—	.596	8.7	2.4	1.4	1.3	14.1
2022–23	NorthPort	56	33.8	.455	.359	—	.636	7.5	2.4	1.4	.9	15.1
2022–23	Barangay Ginebra	56	33.8	.455	.359	—	.636	7.5	2.4	1.4	.9	15.1
2023–24	Barangay Ginebra	20	31.9	.414	.347	—	.709	6.1	3.2	.7	.7	14.8
2024–25	Barangay Ginebra	37	26.2	.404	.315	.111	.675	5.2	1.8	.8	.6	11.4
Career		138	31.7	.434	.337	.111	.644	6.9	2.3	1.1	.9	13.9

== Personal life ==
Malonzo is of Filipino descent through his mother, Maria Teresa Malonzo, an immigrant from Pampanga, and African American descent through his father. He used his mother's maiden name, Malonzo, on his jerseys throughout his UAAP and PBA career to represent his Filipino roots.
