= 2024–25 NorthPort Batang Pier season =

- Head coach: Bonnie Tan
- General Manager: Pido Jarencio; Waiyip Chong (assistant)
- Owner(s): Sultan 900 Capital, Inc.

Governors' Cup results
- Record: 3–7 (30%)
- Place: 5th in group A
- Playoff finish: Did not qualify

Commissioner's Cup results
- Record: 9–3 (75%)
- Place: 1st
- Playoff finish: Semifinalist (lost to Barangay Ginebra 1–4)

Philippine Cup results
- Record: 2–9 (18.2%)
- Place: 11th
- Playoff finish: Did not qualify

NorthPort Batang Pier seasons

The 2024–25 NorthPort Batang Pier season was the 12th and last season of the franchise in the Philippine Basketball Association (PBA).

== Key dates ==
- July 14: The PBA season 49 draft was held at the Glorietta Activity Center in Makati.

== Draft picks ==
Round	Pick	Player	Position	Place of birth	College
1	5	Dave Ildefonso	G/F	Philippines	Ateneo
2	14	Evan Nelle	G	Philippines	De La Salle
3	29	Agem Miranda	G	Philippines	JRU
4	39	John Uduba	F	Philippines	Olivarez
5	46	Germy Mahinay	C	Philippines	NU
6	48	Robbi Darang	G	Philippines	Diliman

== Roster ==
2024–25 NorthPort Batang Pier roster
Players
Coaches

Pos.	#	POB	Name	Height	Weight	DOB (YYYY–MM–DD)	From
G/F	0	(Philippines)	Paolo Taha	6 ft 0 in (1.83 m)	180 lb (82 kg)	1990–12–05	St. Benilde
F	1	(Philippines)	Sidney Onwubere	6 ft 4 in (1.93 m)		1993–08–01	Emilio Aguinaldo
G	3	(Philippines)	Fran Yu	5 ft 9 in (1.75 m)	154 lb (70 kg)	1998–06–16	Letran
G	5	(Philippines)	Allyn Bulanadi	6 ft 0 in (1.83 m)		1997–04–28	San Sebastian
G	7	(Philippines)	Jerrick Balanza	6 ft 1 in (1.85 m)	190 lb (86 kg)	1996–09–06	Letran
G	15	(Canada)	James Kwekuteye	6 ft 2 in (1.88 m)	182 lb (83 kg)	1998–08–15	San Beda
F	17	(Philippines)	Calvin Abueva	6 ft 3 in (1.91 m)	209 lb (95 kg)	1988–02–04	San Sebastian
G	20	(Philippines)	Evan Nelle (R)	5 ft 11 in (1.80 m)		1998–06–08	De La Salle
F/C	22	(Australia)	Cade Flores	6 ft 5 in (1.96 m)	214 lb (97 kg)		Arellano
G/F	24	(United States)	Joshua Munzon (C)	6 ft 4 in (1.93 m)	200 lb (91 kg)	1995–01–15	Cal State LA
G	27	(Canada)	Avan Nava (R)	6 ft 2 in (1.88 m)	180 lb (82 kg)	2000–04–04	St. Francis Xavier
G	28	(Philippines)	Jio Jalalon	5 ft 9 in (1.75 m)	150 lb (68 kg)	1992–08–02	Arellano
C	37	(Philippines)	Damie Cuntapay	6 ft 5 in (1.96 m)		1998–10–22	San Beda

Head coach

- (Philippines) Bonnie Tan

Assistant coach(es)

- (Philippines) Jeff Napa (1st assistant)
- (Philippines) Rensy Bajar
- (Philippines) Alfredo Jarencio II
- (Philippines) Michael Oliver

Team manager

- (Philippines) Pido Jarencio
- (Philippines) Waiyip Chong (assistant)

Legend

- (C) Team captain
- (CI) Commissioner's Cup Import
- (GI) Governors' Cup Import
- (EI) EASL Import
- (DP) Unsigned draft pick
- (FA) Free agent
- (IN) Inactive
- (S) Suspended
- (R) Rookie
- Injured

Roster

== Governors' Cup ==
=== Eliminations ===
==== Group A Standings ====
Pos	Team	W	L	PCT	GB	Qualification
1	TNT Tropang Giga	8	2	.800	—	Quarterfinals
2	Meralco Bolts	7	3	.700	1	Quarterfinals
3	Converge FiberXers	6	4	.600	2	Quarterfinals
4	Magnolia Chicken Timplados Hotshots	5	5	.500	3	Quarterfinals
5	NorthPort Batang Pier	3	7	.300	5	
6	Terrafirma Dyip	1	9	.100	7	

Source: PBA.ph
Rules for classification: 1) winning percentage; 2) if two teams are tied, head-to-head record, if three or more teams are tied, head-to-head goal average (quotient); 3) overall quotient; 4) coin toss

==== Game log ====
2024 PBA Governors' Cup game log
Total: 3–7
August: 2–1

Game	Date	Opponent	Score	High points	High rebounds	High assists	Location Attendance	Record
1	August 20	TNT	L 95–101	Taylor Johns (36)	Taylor Johns (16)	Taylor Johns (9)	Smart Araneta Coliseum	0–1
2	August 23	Terrafirma	W 112–93	William Navarro (31)	Venky Jois (15)	Arvin Tolentino (9)	Smart Araneta Coliseum	1–1
3	August 29	Converge	W 135–109	Arvin Tolentino (51)	Venky Jois (10)	Jalalon, Navarro, Yu (5)	Ninoy Aquino Stadium	2–1

September: 1–6

Game	Date	Opponent	Score	High points	High rebounds	High assists	Location Attendance	Record
4	September 1	Meralco	L 99–109	Arvin Tolentino (21)	William Navarro (11)	Jalalon, Nelle (4)	Ninoy Aquino Stadium	2–2
5	September 4	Magnolia	L 94–105	Cade Flores (23)	Arvin Tolentino (12)	Arvin Tolentino (6)	Smart Araneta Coliseum	2–3
6	September 8	Terrafirma	W 133–107	Venky Jois (26)	Venky Jois (15)	Arvin Tolentino (10)	Ninoy Aquino Stadium	3–3
7	September 11	Converge	L 99–107	Venky Jois (24)	Venky Jois (14)	Jio Jalalon (8)	Ninoy Aquino Stadium	3–4
8	September 14	Meralco	L 104–114	Arvin Tolentino (28)	Arvin Tolentino (7)	Tolentino, Yu (5)	Ninoy Aquino Stadium	3–5
9	September 20	Magnolia	L 94–110	Arvin Tolentino (25)	Cade Flores (8)	Jalalon, Tolentino (5)	Ninoy Aquino Stadium	3–6
10	September 22	TNT	L 79–99	Arvin Tolentino (24)	Sidney Onwubere (12)	Jio Jalalon (5)	Smart Araneta Coliseum	3–7

== Commissioner's Cup ==
=== Eliminations ===
==== Standings ====
Pos	Team	W	L	PCT	GB	Qualification
1	NorthPort Batang Pier	9	3	.750	—	Twice-to-beat in the quarterfinals
2	TNT Tropang Giga	8	4	.667 (Note: Head-to-head quotient: TNT 1.04, Converge 1.03, Barangay Ginebra 0.94)	1	Twice-to-beat in the quarterfinals
3	Converge FiberXers	8	4	.667	1	Best-of-three quarterfinals
4	Barangay Ginebra San Miguel	8	4	.667	1	Best-of-three quarterfinals
5	Meralco Bolts	7	5	.583 (Note: Head-to-head quotient: Meralco 1.08, Rain or Shine 1.04, Eastern 0.88)	2	Best-of-three quarterfinals
6	Rain or Shine Elasto Painters	7	5	.583	2	Best-of-three quarterfinals
7	Eastern (G)	7	5	.583	2	Twice-to-win in the quarterfinals
8	Magnolia Chicken Timplados Hotshots	6	6	.500 (Note: Eighth seed playoff: Magnolia 112–81 NLEX)	3	Twice-to-win in the quarterfinals
9	NLEX Road Warriors	6	6	.500	3	
10	San Miguel Beermen	5	7	.417	4	
11	Blackwater Bossing	3	9	.250 (Note: Head-to-head record: Blackwater 1–0 Phoenix)	6	
12	Phoenix Fuel Masters	3	9	.250	6	
13	Terrafirma Dyip	1	11	.083	8	

Source: PBA.ph
Rules for classification: 1) winning percentage; 2) if two teams are tied, head-to-head record; if three or more teams are tied, head-to-head goal average (quotient); if tied for 8th, one-game playoff; 3) overall quotient; 4) coin toss
(G) Guests

==== Game log ====
2024–25 PBA Commissioner's Cup game log
Total: 9–3
November: 2–0

Game	Date	Opponent	Score	High points	High rebounds	High assists	Location Attendance	Record
1	November 28, 2024	NLEX	W 114–87	Arvin Tolentino (29)	Evan Nelle (7)	Evan Nelle (8)	Ninoy Aquino Stadium	1–0
2	November 30, 2024	Terrafirma	W 113–101	Kadeem Jack (32)	Kadeem Jack (15)	Tolentino, Yu (10)	Ynares Center	2–0

December: 4–1

Game	Date	Opponent	Score	High points	High rebounds	High assists	Location Attendance	Record
3	December 4, 2024	Magnolia	W 107–103	Kadeem Jack (30)	Kadeem Jack (11)	Fran Yu (10)	Ninoy Aquino Stadium	3–0
4	December 8, 2024	TNT	W 100–95	Kadeem Jack (27)	Jack, Tolentino (11)	Evan Nelle (8)	Ynares Center	4–0
5	December 12, 2024	Converge	W 108–101	Kadeem Jack (32)	Kadeem Jack (15)	Evan Nelle (5)	Ninoy Aquino Stadium	5–0
6	December 17, 2024	Phoenix	L 109–115	Kadeem Jack (28)	Kadeem Jack (16)	Evan Nelle (6)	Ninoy Aquino Stadium	5–1
7	December 20, 2024	Eastern	W 120–113	Kadeem Jack (38)	Kadeem Jack (9)	Fran Yu (9)	PhilSports Arena	6–1

January: 3–2

Game	Date	Opponent	Score	High points	High rebounds	High assists	Location Attendance	Record
8	January 8, 2025	Barangay Ginebra	W 119–116	Kadeem Jack (32)	Kadeem Jack (16)	Joshua Munzon (6)	PhilSports Arena	7–1
9	January 14, 2025	Meralco	L 94–111	Kadeem Jack (29)	Kadeem Jack (14)	Joshua Munzon (6)	Ninoy Aquino Stadium	7–2
10	January 16, 2025	Rain or Shine	L 107–127	Kadeem Jack (39)	Kadeem Jack (11)	Fran Yu (8)	PhilSports Arena	7–3
11	January 21, 2025	San Miguel	W 105–104	Kadeem Jack (38)	Arvin Tolentino (8)	Munzon, Nelle (5)	Ynares Center	8–3
12	January 25, 2025	Blackwater	W 120–93	Kadeem Jack (30)	Arvin Tolentino (10)	Arvin Tolentino (11)	Ynares Center	9–3

=== Playoffs ===
==== Bracket ====
Quarterfinals
(#1 twice-to-beat)
1	NorthPort	113
8	Magnolia	110
(Best-of-3)
4	Barangay Ginebra	2
5	Meralco	1
(#2 twice-to-beat)
2	TNT	109
7	Eastern	93
(Best-of-3)
3	Converge	1
6	Rain or Shine	2

Semifinals (Best-of-7)
1	NorthPort	1
4	Barangay Ginebra	4
2	TNT	4
6	Rain or Shine	1

Finals (Best-of-7)
4	Barangay Ginebra	3
2	TNT	4

==== Game log ====
2024–25 PBA Commissioner's Cup playoffs game log
Total: 2–4
Quarterfinals: 1–0

Game	Date	Opponent	Score	High points	High rebounds	High assists	Location Attendance	Series
1	February 6, 2025	Magnolia	W 113–110	Kadeem Jack (30)	Kadeem Jack (10)	Joshua Munzon (5)	Ninoy Aquino Stadium	1–0

Semifinals: 1–4

Game	Date	Opponent	Score	High points	High rebounds	High assists	Location Attendance	Series
1	February 26, 2025	Barangay Ginebra	L 93–115	Kadeem Jack (33)	Kadeem Jack (12)	Joshua Munzon (3)	Smart Araneta Coliseum	0–1
2	February 28, 2025	Barangay Ginebra	L 106–119	Kadeem Jack (27)	William Navarro (12)	Fran Yu (6)	PhilSports Arena	0–2
3	March 2, 2025	Barangay Ginebra	L 100–127	Kadeem Jack (32)	Flores, Tolentino (5)	Jack, Yu (4)	Smart Araneta Coliseum	0–3
4	March 5, 2025	Barangay Ginebra	W 108–103	Kadeem Jack (39)	Kadeem Jack (15)	Arvin Tolentino (11)	Smart Araneta Coliseum	1–3
5	March 7, 2025	Barangay Ginebra	L 99–126	Kadeem Jack (31)	Arvin Tolentino (13)	Joshua Munzon (11)	Smart Araneta Coliseum	1–4

== Philippine Cup ==
=== Eliminations ===
==== Standings ====
Pos	Team	W	L	PCT	GB	Qualification
1	San Miguel Beermen	8	3	.727 (Note: Head-to-head quotient: San Miguel 1.06, NLEX 1.01, Magnolia 0.97, Barangay Ginebra 0.96)	—	Twice-to-beat in the quarterfinals
2	NLEX Road Warriors	8	3	.727	—	Twice-to-beat in the quarterfinals
3	Magnolia Chicken Timplados Hotshots	8	3	.727	—	Twice-to-beat in the quarterfinals
4	Barangay Ginebra San Miguel	8	3	.727	—	Twice-to-beat in the quarterfinals
5	Converge FiberXers	7	4	.636	1	Twice-to-win in the quarterfinals
6	TNT Tropang 5G	6	5	.545 (Note: Head-to-head quotient: TNT 1.13, Rain or Shine 1.02, Meralco 0.87)	2	Twice-to-win in the quarterfinals
7	Rain or Shine Elasto Painters	6	5	.545	2	Twice-to-win in the quarterfinals
8	Meralco Bolts	6	5	.545	2	Twice-to-win in the quarterfinals
9	Phoenix Fuel Masters	4	7	.364	4	
10	Blackwater Bossing	2	9	.182 (Note: Head-to-head record: Blackwater 1–0 NorthPort)	6	
11	NorthPort Batang Pier	2	9	.182	6	
12	Terrafirma Dyip	1	10	.091	7	

Source: PBA.ph
Rules for classification: 1) winning percentage; 2) if two teams are tied, head-to-head record; if three or more teams are tied, head-to-head goal average (quotient); if tied for 8th, one-game playoff; 3) overall quotient; 4) coin toss

==== Game log ====
2025 PBA Philippine Cup game log
Total: 2–9
April: 1–3

Game	Date	Opponent	Score	High points	High rebounds	High assists	Location Attendance	Record
1	April 12	Terrafirma	W 97–75	Arvin Tolentino (19)	William Navarro (10)	Arvin Tolentino (12)	Ninoy Aquino Stadium	1–0
2	April 16	Rain or Shine	L 96–113	William Navarro (22)	Navarro, Onwubere (12)	Joshua Munzon (7)	Smart Araneta Coliseum	1–1
3	April 25	Blackwater	L 98–120	Joshua Munzon (27)	William Navarro (11)	Jio Jalalon (6)	Smart Araneta Coliseum	1–2
4	April 30	Barangay Ginebra	L 106–131	William Navarro (19)	Munzon, Navarro (7)	Jio Jalalon (9)	PhilSports Arena	1–3

May: 0–4

Game	Date	Opponent	Score	High points	High rebounds	High assists	Location Attendance	Record
5	May 9	Meralco	L 104–105	Joshua Munzon (36)	William Navarro (12)	Evan Nelle (5)	PhilSports Arena	1–4
6	May 16	Converge	L 92–111	Joshua Munzon (23)	William Navarro (9)	Joshua Munzon (6)	PhilSports Arena	1–5
7	May 24	Magnolia	L 97–106	William Navarro (27)	William Navarro (13)	Bulanadi, Munzon (4)	Candon City Arena	1–6
8	May 30	TNT	L 70–94	Joshua Munzon (20)	Cade Flores (12)	Joshua Munzon (3)	Smart Araneta Coliseum	1–7

June: 1–2

Game	Date	Opponent	Score	High points	High rebounds	High assists	Location Attendance	Record
9	June 4	Phoenix	L 107–118	Joshua Munzon (32)	Abueva, Munzon (7)	Jio Jalalon (6)	PhilSports Arena	1–8
10	June 11	NLEX	W 113–108	Cade Flores (26)	Cade Flores (15)	Joshua Munzon (12)	Ninoy Aquino Stadium	2–8
11	June 15	San Miguel	L 91–126	Joshua Munzon (19)	Cade Flores (12)	Munzon, Yu (4)	Ynares Center	2–9

== Transactions ==
=== Free agency ===
==== Signings ====
Player	Date signed	Contract amount	Contract length	Former team	Ref.
Ben Adamos	June 7, 2024	Not disclosed	1 year	Re-signed	
Kris Rosales	June 7, 2024	Not disclosed	1 year	Re-signed	
Paul Zamar	June 7, 2024	Not disclosed	1 year	Re-signed	
John Amores	June 9, 2024	Not disclosed	2 years	Re-signed	
JM Calma	June 9, 2024	Not disclosed	2 years	Re-signed	
Joshua Munzon	June 21, 2024	Not disclosed	2 years	Re-signed	
Allyn Bulanadi	July 25, 2024	Not disclosed	1 year	Re-signed	

==== Subtractions ====
Player	Number	Position	Reason	New team	Ref.
Jeff Chan	16	Small forward / Shooting guard	End of contract	Biñan Tatak Gel (MPBL)	
Kris Rosales	11	Point guard	Released	San Miguel Beermen	
John Amores	19, 13	Shooting guard	License revoked		
Arvin Tolentino	10	Small forward / Power forward	Going abroad	Seoul SK Knights (KBL)	
Paul Zamar	8	Shooting guard / Point guard	Released		
Agem Miranda	4	Point guard / Shooting guard	Released		

=== Trades ===
==== Pre-season ====
July
July 15, 2024	To NorthPort Jio Jalalon; Abu Tratter	To Magnolia Zavier Lucero
July 15, 2024	To NorthPort Sidney Onwubere	To Barangay Ginebra Ben Adamos
July 17, 2024	To NorthPort 2026 Terrafirma second-round pick	To Terrafirma Brent Paraiso

==== Mid-season ====
April
April 2, 2025	To NorthPort Avan Nava; 2025 San Miguel second-round pick	To San Miguel JM Calma

==== Philippine Cup ====
April
April 23, 2025	To NorthPort James Kwekuteye	To Blackwater Abu Tratter
May
May 27, 2025	To NorthPort Calvin Abueva; Jerrick Balanza; 2026 Magnolia second-round pick	To Magnolia William Navarro

=== Recruited imports ===
Tournament	Name	Debuted	Last game	Record	Ref.
Governors' Cup	Taylor Johns	August 20, 2024 (vs. TNT)		0–1	
Governors' Cup	Venky Jois	August 23, 2024 (vs. Terrafirma)	September 14, 2024 (vs. Meralco)	3–3	
Commissioner's Cup	Kadeem Jack	November 28, 2024 (vs. NLEX)	March 7, 2025 (vs. Barangay Ginebra)	11–7	

== Awards ==
Recipient	Award	Date awarded	Reference
Arvin Tolentino	2024–25 PBA Commissioner's Cup Best Player of the Conference	March 21, 2025	
Arvin Tolentino	2024–25 PBA Scoring Champion	October 13, 2025	
Joshua Munzon	2024–25 PBA Most Improved Player	October 5, 2025	
Recipient	Honors	Date awarded	Reference
Arvin Tolentino	2024–25 PBA Mythical First Team	October 5, 2025	
Joshua Munzon	2024–25 PBA All-Defensive Team	October 5, 2025	
