= 2024–25 Terrafirma Dyip season =

- Head coach: Johnedel Cardel (Governors' Cup); Raymond Tiongco (interim)
- General manager: Ronald Tubid (Governors' Cup); AC Valdemor
- Owner: Terrafirma Realty Development Corporation

Governors' Cup results
- Record: 1–9 (10%)
- Place: 6th in group A
- Playoff finish: Did not qualify

Commissioner's Cup results
- Record: 1–11 (8.3%)
- Place: 13th
- Playoff finish: Did not qualify

Philippine Cup results
- Record: 1–10 (9.1%)
- Place: 12th
- Playoff finish: Did not qualify

Terrafirma Dyip seasons

The 2024–25 Terrafirma Dyip season was the 10th season of the franchise in the Philippine Basketball Association (PBA).

== Key dates ==
- July 14: The PBA season 49 draft was held at the Glorietta Activity Center in Makati.

== Draft picks ==
Round	Pick	Player	Position	Place of birth	College
1	10	Mark Nonoy	G	Philippines	De La Salle
2	15	CJ Catapusan	F	Philippines	UP
3	27	Peter Alfaro	G	Philippines	San Beda

== Roster ==
2024–25 Terrafirma Dyip roster
Players
Coaches

Pos.	#	POB	Name	Height	Weight	DOB (YYYY–MM–DD)	From
G	1	(Philippines)	Mark Nonoy (R)	5 ft 9 in (1.75 m)		2000–07–24	De La Salle
C	5	(Philippines)	Keith Zaldivar	6 ft 6 in (1.98 m)		1996–05–25	Adamson
F	6	(Philippines)	Louie Sangalang	6 ft 4 in (1.93 m)	198 lb (90 kg)		Letran
G	7	(Philippines)	Terrence Romeo	5 ft 11 in (1.80 m)	178 lb (81 kg)	1992–03–16	Far Eastern
G	8	(Philippines)	Tommy Olivario	5 ft 9 in (1.75 m)	190 lb (86 kg)		Letran
F	9	(Philippines)	CJ Catapusan (R)	6 ft 3 in (1.91 m)			Philippines
G	11	(United States)	Stanley Pringle	6 ft 1 in (1.85 m)	190 lb (86 kg)	1987–03–05	Penn State
F	13	(Philippines)	Kevin Ferrer	6 ft 5 in (1.96 m)	188 lb (85 kg)	1993–03–26	UST
G	15	(Philippines)	Aljun Melecio	5 ft 8 in (1.73 m)	160 lb (73 kg)	1998–07–25	De La Salle
F/C	17	(Philippines)	Aldrech Ramos	6 ft 6 in (1.98 m)	190 lb (86 kg)	1988–04–03	Far Eastern
G	19	(Philippines)	Paolo Hernandez (R)	6 ft 0 in (1.83 m)			Mapúa
G	28	(Philippines)	Didat Hanapi (R)	6 ft 2 in (1.88 m)		2001–07–31	Adamson
F/C	33	(Philippines)	Kemark Cariño	6 ft 9 in (2.06 m)	203 lb (92 kg)	1998–02–01	San Beda
G	38	(Philippines)	Brent Paraiso	6 ft 1 in (1.85 m)	190 lb (86 kg)		Letran

Head coach

- (Philippines) Raymond Tiongco (interim)

Assistant coach(es)

- (Philippines) Raymond Gavieres
- (Philippines) Ronald Tubid
- (Philippines) Joe Lipa (consultant)
- (Philippines) AC Valdemor (consultant)

Team manager

- (Philippines) Ronald Tubid

Legend

- (C) Team captain
- (CI) Commissioner's Cup Import
- (GI) Governors' Cup Import
- (EI) EASL Import
- (DP) Unsigned draft pick
- (FA) Free agent
- (IN) Inactive
- (S) Suspended
- (R) Rookie
- Injured

Roster

== Governors' Cup ==
=== Eliminations ===
==== Group A Standings ====
Pos	Team	W	L	PCT	GB	Qualification
1	TNT Tropang Giga	8	2	.800	—	Quarterfinals
2	Meralco Bolts	7	3	.700	1	Quarterfinals
3	Converge FiberXers	6	4	.600	2	Quarterfinals
4	Magnolia Chicken Timplados Hotshots	5	5	.500	3	Quarterfinals
5	NorthPort Batang Pier	3	7	.300	5	
6	Terrafirma Dyip	1	9	.100	7	

Source: PBA.ph
Rules for classification: 1) winning percentage; 2) if two teams are tied, head-to-head record, if three or more teams are tied, head-to-head goal average (quotient); 3) overall quotient; 4) coin toss

==== Game log ====
2024 PBA Governors' Cup game log
Total: 1–9
August: 0–3

Game	Date	Opponent	Score	High points	High rebounds	High assists	Location Attendance	Record
1	August 21	Converge	L 95–127	Stanley Pringle (19)	Antonio Hester (10)	Stanley Pringle (7)	Smart Araneta Coliseum	0–1
2	August 23	NorthPort	L 93–112	Juami Tiongson (19)	Antonio Hester (11)	Stanley Pringle (7)	Smart Araneta Coliseum	0–2
3	August 28	Meralco	L 91–107	Stanley Pringle (19)	Antonio Hester (8)	Stanley Pringle (6)	Ninoy Aquino Stadium	0–3

September: 1–6

Game	Date	Opponent	Score	High points	High rebounds	High assists	Location Attendance	Record
4	September 1	Magnolia	L 103–124	Stanley Pringle (23)	Christian Standhardinger (12)	Hernandez, Pringle, Standhardinger (5)	Ninoy Aquino Stadium	0–4
5	September 5	TNT	L 89–107	Antonio Hester (23)	Antonio Hester (18)	Pringle, Standhardinger (4)	Ninoy Aquino Stadium	0–5
6	September 8	NorthPort	L 107–133	Christian Standhardinger (22)	Christian Standhardinger (10)	Tommy Olivario (8)	Ninoy Aquino Stadium	0–6
7	September 12	Magnolia	L 98–99	Antonio Hester (39)	Antonio Hester (16)	Hester, Olivario (5)	Ninoy Aquino Stadium	0–7
8	September 14	Converge	L 99–100	Antonio Hester (28)	Antonio Hester (11)	Hester, Pringle (7)	Ninoy Aquino Stadium	0–8
9	September 19	TNT	W 84–72	Antonio Hester (22)	Antonio Hester (10)	Paolo Hernandez (6)	Ninoy Aquino Stadium	1–8
10	September 21	Meralco	L 82–124	Antonio Hester (18)	Antonio Hester (11)	Hernandez, Hester, Olivario, Sangalang (3)	Ninoy Aquino Stadium	1–9

== Commissioner's Cup ==
=== Eliminations ===
==== Standings ====
Pos	Team	W	L	PCT	GB	Qualification
1	NorthPort Batang Pier	9	3	.750	—	Twice-to-beat in the quarterfinals
2	TNT Tropang Giga	8	4	.667 (Note: Head-to-head quotient: TNT 1.04, Converge 1.03, Barangay Ginebra 0.94)	1	Twice-to-beat in the quarterfinals
3	Converge FiberXers	8	4	.667	1	Best-of-three quarterfinals
4	Barangay Ginebra San Miguel	8	4	.667	1	Best-of-three quarterfinals
5	Meralco Bolts	7	5	.583 (Note: Head-to-head quotient: Meralco 1.08, Rain or Shine 1.04, Eastern 0.88)	2	Best-of-three quarterfinals
6	Rain or Shine Elasto Painters	7	5	.583	2	Best-of-three quarterfinals
7	Eastern (G)	7	5	.583	2	Twice-to-win in the quarterfinals
8	Magnolia Chicken Timplados Hotshots	6	6	.500 (Note: Eighth seed playoff: Magnolia 112–81 NLEX)	3	Twice-to-win in the quarterfinals
9	NLEX Road Warriors	6	6	.500	3	
10	San Miguel Beermen	5	7	.417	4	
11	Blackwater Bossing	3	9	.250 (Note: Head-to-head record: Blackwater 1–0 Phoenix)	6	
12	Phoenix Fuel Masters	3	9	.250	6	
13	Terrafirma Dyip	1	11	.083	8	

Source: PBA.ph
Rules for classification: 1) winning percentage; 2) if two teams are tied, head-to-head record; if three or more teams are tied, head-to-head goal average (quotient); if tied for 8th, one-game playoff; 3) overall quotient; 4) coin toss
(G) Guests

==== Game log ====
2024–25 PBA Commissioner's Cup game log
Total: 1–11
November: 0–2

Game	Date	Opponent	Score	High points	High rebounds	High assists	Location Attendance	Record
1	November 27, 2024	Converge	L 87–116	CJ Catapusan (13)	Ryan Richards (10)	Hernandez, Sangalang (3)	PhilSports Arena	0–1
2	November 30, 2024	NorthPort	L 101–113	Vic Manuel (23)	Aldrech Ramos (7)	Stanley Pringle (4)	Ynares Center	0–2

December: 0–5

Game	Date	Opponent	Score	High points	High rebounds	High assists	Location Attendance	Record
3	December 3, 2024	NLEX	L 85–104	Vic Manuel (22)	Ryan Richards (7)	Louie Sangalang (6)	Ninoy Aquino Stadium	0–3
4	December 6, 2024	Meralco	L 91–96	Brandon Edwards (21)	Brandon Edwards (13)	Melecio, Paraiso (3)	Ninoy Aquino Stadium	0–4
5	December 13, 2024	San Miguel	L 88–106	Brandon Edwards (18)	Brandon Edwards (18)	Melecio, Paraiso (3)	Ninoy Aquino Stadium	0–5
6	December 18, 2024	Barangay Ginebra	L 98–114	Brandon Edwards (27)	Brandon Edwards (12)	Stanley Pringle (9)	Ninoy Aquino Stadium	0–6
7	December 22, 2024	Rain or Shine	L 112–124	Brandon Edwards (26)	Brandon Edwards (10)	Manuel, Melecio (4)	PhilSports Arena	0–7

January: 1–4

Game	Date	Opponent	Score	High points	High rebounds	High assists	Location Attendance	Record
8	January 7, 2025	Phoenix	L 108–122	Brandon Edwards (25)	Brandon Edwards (10)	Brent Paraiso (5)	PhilSports Arena	0–8
9	January 10, 2025	Magnolia	L 84–89	Stanley Pringle (22)	Brandon Edwards (8)	Manuel, Paraiso (4)	Ninoy Aquino Stadium	0–9
10	January 15, 2025	Blackwater	L 86–96	Brandon Edwards (29)	Brandon Edwards (16)	Ferrer, Hernandez (4)	Ninoy Aquino Stadium	0–10
11	January 17, 2025	Eastern	L 133–110	Brandon Edwards (26)	Brandon Edwards (17)	Stanley Pringle (8)	PhilSports Arena	0–11
12	January 22, 2025	TNT	W 117–108	Mark Nonoy (33)	Brandon Edwards (12)	Brandon Edwards (6)	Ynares Center	1–11

== Philippine Cup ==
=== Eliminations ===
==== Standings ====
Pos	Team	W	L	PCT	GB	Qualification
1	San Miguel Beermen	8	3	.727 (Note: Head-to-head quotient: San Miguel 1.06, NLEX 1.01, Magnolia 0.97, Barangay Ginebra 0.96)	—	Twice-to-beat in the quarterfinals
2	NLEX Road Warriors	8	3	.727	—	Twice-to-beat in the quarterfinals
3	Magnolia Chicken Timplados Hotshots	8	3	.727	—	Twice-to-beat in the quarterfinals
4	Barangay Ginebra San Miguel	8	3	.727	—	Twice-to-beat in the quarterfinals
5	Converge FiberXers	7	4	.636	1	Twice-to-win in the quarterfinals
6	TNT Tropang 5G	6	5	.545 (Note: Head-to-head quotient: TNT 1.13, Rain or Shine 1.02, Meralco 0.87)	2	Twice-to-win in the quarterfinals
7	Rain or Shine Elasto Painters	6	5	.545	2	Twice-to-win in the quarterfinals
8	Meralco Bolts	6	5	.545	2	Twice-to-win in the quarterfinals
9	Phoenix Fuel Masters	4	7	.364	4	
10	Blackwater Bossing	2	9	.182 (Note: Head-to-head record: Blackwater 1–0 NorthPort)	6	
11	NorthPort Batang Pier	2	9	.182	6	
12	Terrafirma Dyip	1	10	.091	7	

Source: PBA.ph
Rules for classification: 1) winning percentage; 2) if two teams are tied, head-to-head record; if three or more teams are tied, head-to-head goal average (quotient); if tied for 8th, one-game playoff; 3) overall quotient; 4) coin toss

==== Game log ====
2025 PBA Philippine Cup game log
Total: 1–10
April: 1–3

Game	Date	Opponent	Score	High points	High rebounds	High assists	Location Attendance	Record
1	April 4	Phoenix	W 95–87	Louie Sangalang (21)	Catapusan, Sangalang (8)	Aljun Melecio (5)	Ninoy Aquino Stadium	1–0
2	April 6	Meralco	L 80–118	Louie Sangalang (23)	Ramos, Sangalang (7)	Aljun Melecio (5)	Ninoy Aquino Stadium	1–1
3	April 12	NorthPort	L 75–97	CJ Catapusan (16)	Catapusan, Ferrer (5)	Louie Sangalang (4)	Ninoy Aquino Stadium	1–2
4	April 23	Barangay Ginebra	L 80–101	CJ Catapusan (14)	Louie Sangalang (6)	Ferrer, Melecio (4)	Smart Araneta Coliseum	1–3

May: 0–5

Game	Date	Opponent	Score	High points	High rebounds	High assists	Location Attendance	Record
5	May 4	Magnolia	L 94–127	Louie Sangalang (19)	Louie Sangalang (12)	Louie Sangalang (7)	Ynares Center	1–4
6	May 9	TNT	L 74–110	Nonoy, Sangalang (16)	Louie Sangalang (16)	Stanley Pringle (4)	PhilSports Arena	1–5
7	May 14	NLEX	L 87–117	Kevin Ferrer (23)	Louie Sangalang (11)	Pringle, Sangalang (4)	Ninoy Aquino Stadium	1–6
8	May 18	San Miguel	L 89–128	Mark Nonoy (24)	Louie Sangalang (14)	Louie Sangalang (6)	Ynares Center II; 8,175	1–7
9	May 28	Converge	L 103–117	Stanley Pringle (23)	Aldrech Ramos (9)	Mark Nonoy (6)	PhilSports Arena	1–8

June: 0–2

Game	Date	Opponent	Score	High points	High rebounds	High assists	Location Attendance	Record
10	June 4	Rain or Shine	L 85–94	Louie Sangalang (22)	Stanley Pringle (11)	Stanley Pringle (6)	PhilSports Arena	1–9
11	June 8	Blackwater	L 82–97	Louie Sangalang (24)	Aldrech Ramos (9)	Paraiso, Sangalang (3)	Ninoy Aquino Stadium	1–10

== Transactions ==
=== Free agency ===
==== Signings ====
Player	Date signed	Contract amount	Contract length	Former team	Ref.
John Grospe	August 15, 2024	Not disclosed	Not disclosed		

==== Subtractions ====
Player	Number	Position	Reason	New team	Ref.
Allen Mina	29	Small forward / Shooting guard	Released	Pangasinan Heatwaves (MPBL)	
Javi Gómez de Liaño	22	Small forward	Going abroad	Anyang Jung Kwan Jang Red Boosters (KBL)	
JP Calvo	8	Point guard	Released	South Cotabato Warriors (MPBL)	
Eric Camson	13	Power forward	Released	Rizal Golden Coolers (MPBL)	
Gelo Alolino	4	Point guard	Released	Converge FiberXers	
Vic Manuel	4	Power forward	Did not renew the contract	Pangasinan Heatwaves (MPBL)	

=== Trades ===
==== Pre-season ====
July
July 13, 2024	To Terrafirma Stanley Pringle; Christian Standhardinger; 2024 Barangay Ginebra first-round pick	To Barangay Ginebra Isaac Go; Stephen Holt; 2024 Terrafirma first-round pick
July 16, 2024	To Terrafirma Didat Hanapi; Paolo Hernandez	To Barangay Ginebra 2025 Terrafirma second-round pick
July 17, 2024	To Terrafirma Brent Paraiso	To NorthPort 2026 Terrafirma second-round pick

==== Mid-season ====
November
November 12, 2024	To Terrafirma Aljun Melecio; Keith Zaldivar; 2025 Converge first-round pick	To Converge Jordan Heading
November 25, 2024	To Terrafirma Vic Manuel; Terrence Romeo	To San Miguel Andreas Cahilig; Juami Tiongson

=== Recruited imports ===
Tournament	Name	Debuted	Last game	Record	Ref.
Governors' Cup	Antonio Hester	August 21, 2024 (vs. Converge)	September 21, 2024 (vs. Meralco)	1–9	
Commissioner's Cup	Ryan Richards	November 27, 2024 (vs. Converge)	December 3, 2024 (vs. NLEX)	0–3	
Commissioner's Cup	Brandon Edwards	December 6, 2024 (vs. Meralco)	January 22, 2025 (vs. TNT)	1–8	
