= Cade Flores =

Filipino basketball player (born 1998)

No. 22 – Titan Ultra Giant Risers
- Position: Power forward
- League: PBA

Personal information
- Born: September 29, 1998 (age 28)
- Listed height: 6 ft 5 in (1.96 m)
- Listed weight: 214 lb (97 kg)

Career information
- College: FEU; Arellano
- PBA draft: 2023: 1st round, 11th overall pick
- Drafted by: NorthPort Batang Pier
- Playing career: 2023–present

Career history
- 2023–2025: NorthPort Batang Pier
- 2025–present: Titan Ultra Giant Risers

Career highlights
- PBA All-Rookie Team (2024)

Cade Flores is a Filipino-Australian professional basketball player for the Titan Ultra Giant Risers of the Philippine Basketball Association (PBA).

Initially from Far Eastern University, Flores moved to Arellano University in 2022 to play for the Chiefs before leaving the team after just one season. In 2023, he was selected by the NorthPort Batang Pier with the 11th pick of the PBA season 48 draft.

== College career ==
Originating from Australia, Flores was originally a member of the FEU Tamaraws, having joined the team in 2018. After four years of being in the Tamaraws' second team, he sought a new opportunity with the Arellano Chiefs in 2022. In NCAA Season 98, he was awarded both Defensive Player of the Year and Rookie of the Year. However, he would no longer play for the team afterwards.

== Professional career ==
=== NorthPort Batang Pier (2023–2025) ===
Following his lone season in Arellano, Flores entered the PBA season 48 draft, where he was selected 11th overall by the NorthPort Batang Pier. On September 26, 2023, he signed a two-year deal with the team. After his first season in the pro leagues, he made the PBA All-Rookie Team.

=== Titan Ultra Giant Risers (2025–present) ===
On September 18, 2025, Flores signed a two-year renewal with NorthPort, two weeks before the team's sale to Pureblends, becoming the Titan Ultra Giant Risers.

== PBA career statistics ==
Legend
GP	Games played	MPG	Minutes per game	FG%	Field-goal percentage
3FG%	3-point field-goal percentage	4P%	4-point field-goal percentage	FT%	Free-throw percentage
RPG	Rebounds per game	APG	Assists per game	SPG	Steals per game
BPG	Blocks per game	PPG	Points per game	127	Career high

As of the end of 2025–26 season

=== Season-by-season averages ===
Year	Team	GP	MPG	FG%	3P%	4P%	FT%	RPG	APG	SPG	BPG	PPG
2023–24	NorthPort	24	26.3	.632	.250	—	.650	7.2	2.1	1.3	.2	9.3
2024–25	NorthPort	38	17.4	.518	.133	—	.707	4.9	.7	.9	.2	6.5
2025–26	Titan Ultra	19	18.0	.544	.333	—	.730	5.1	1.4	.9	.4	6.7
Career		81	20.2	.563	.219	—	.696	5.6	1.3	1.0	.2	7.4
