= Abu Tratter =

Filipino-American basketball player

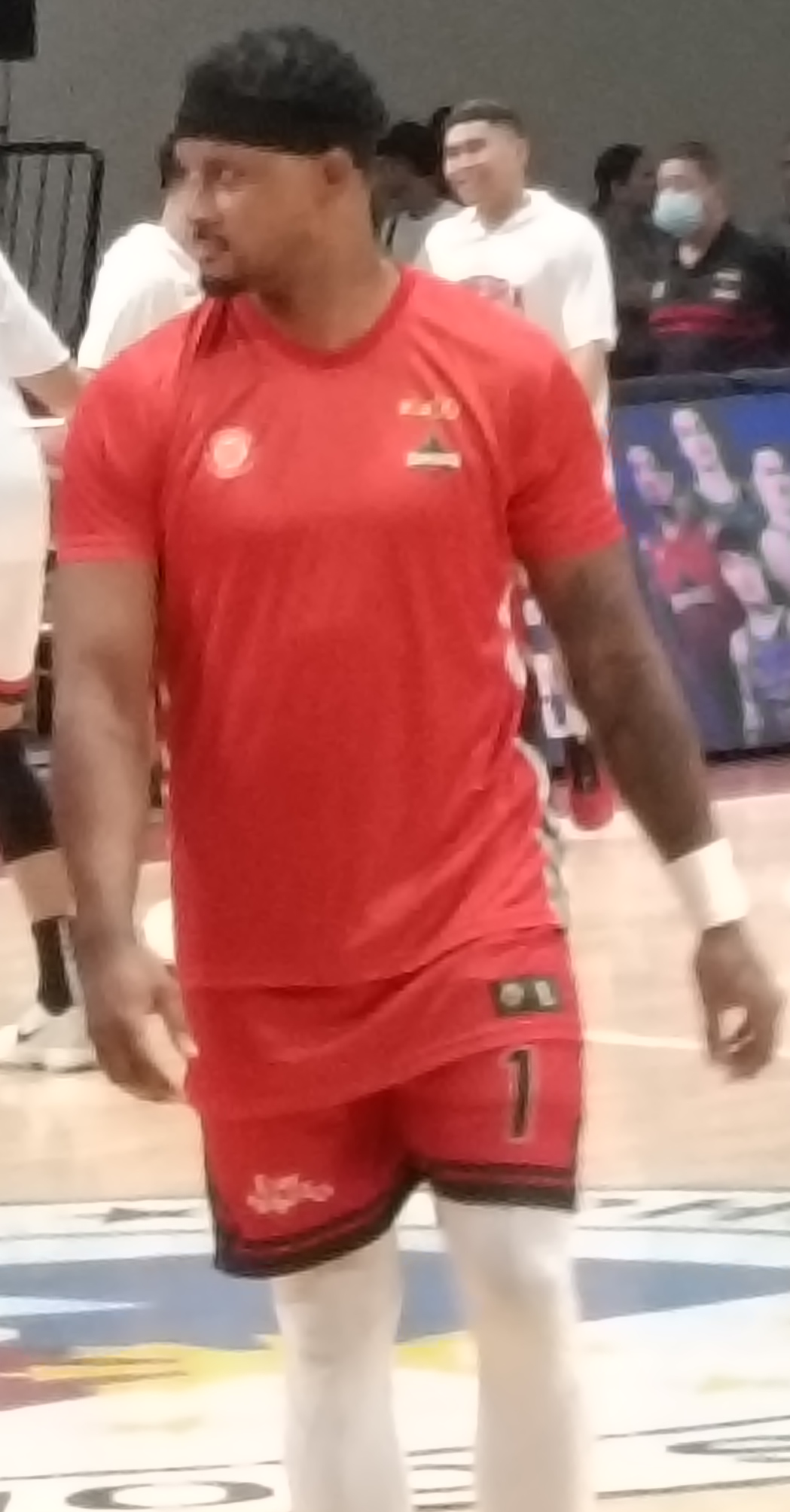
- Tratter in 2025

No. 1 – Blackwater Bossing
- Position: Power forward / center
- League: PBA

Personal information
- Born: January 9, 1993 (age 33) Siniloan, Laguna, Philippines
- Listed height: 6 ft 5 in (1.96 m)
- Listed weight: 231 lb (105 kg)

Career information
- High school: St. Francis High School (Mountain View, California)
- College: DeAnza College (2013); De La Salle (2014–2017)
- PBA draft: 2018: 1st round, 7th overall pick
- Drafted by: NLEX Road Warriors
- Playing career: 2019–present

Career history
- 2019: Blackwater Elite
- 2019–2022: Alaska Aces
- 2022–2023: Converge FiberXers
- 2023–2024: Magnolia Chicken Timplados Hotshots
- 2024–2025: NorthPort Batang Pier
- 2025–present: Blackwater Bossing

Career highlights
- PBA All-Rookie Team (2019); UAAP champion (2016); 2× Filoil Flying V Preseason Cup champion (2014, 2016); Filoil Flying V Preseason Cup Mythical 5 (2016)

Abu Jahal Tratter (born January 9, 1993) is a Filipino-American professional basketball player for the Blackwater Bossing of the Philippine Basketball Association (PBA). He played college basketball for the De La Salle University.

== Professional career ==
Tratter was selected seventh overall during the 2018 PBA draft by the NLEX Road Warriors.

On September 6, 2019, he was traded to the Alaska Aces for Carl Bryan Cruz.

On June 15, 2022, he signed a contract with the Converge FiberXers, the new team that took over the defunct Alaska Aces franchise.

On April 14, 2023, Tratter, along with David Murrell, was traded to the Magnolia Chicken Timplados Hotshots for Adrian Wong and a 2022 first-round pick.

On April 23, 2025, NorthPort traded Tratter to the Blackwater Bossing in exchange for James Kwekuteye, reuniting with the team he first played for.

== PBA career statistics ==
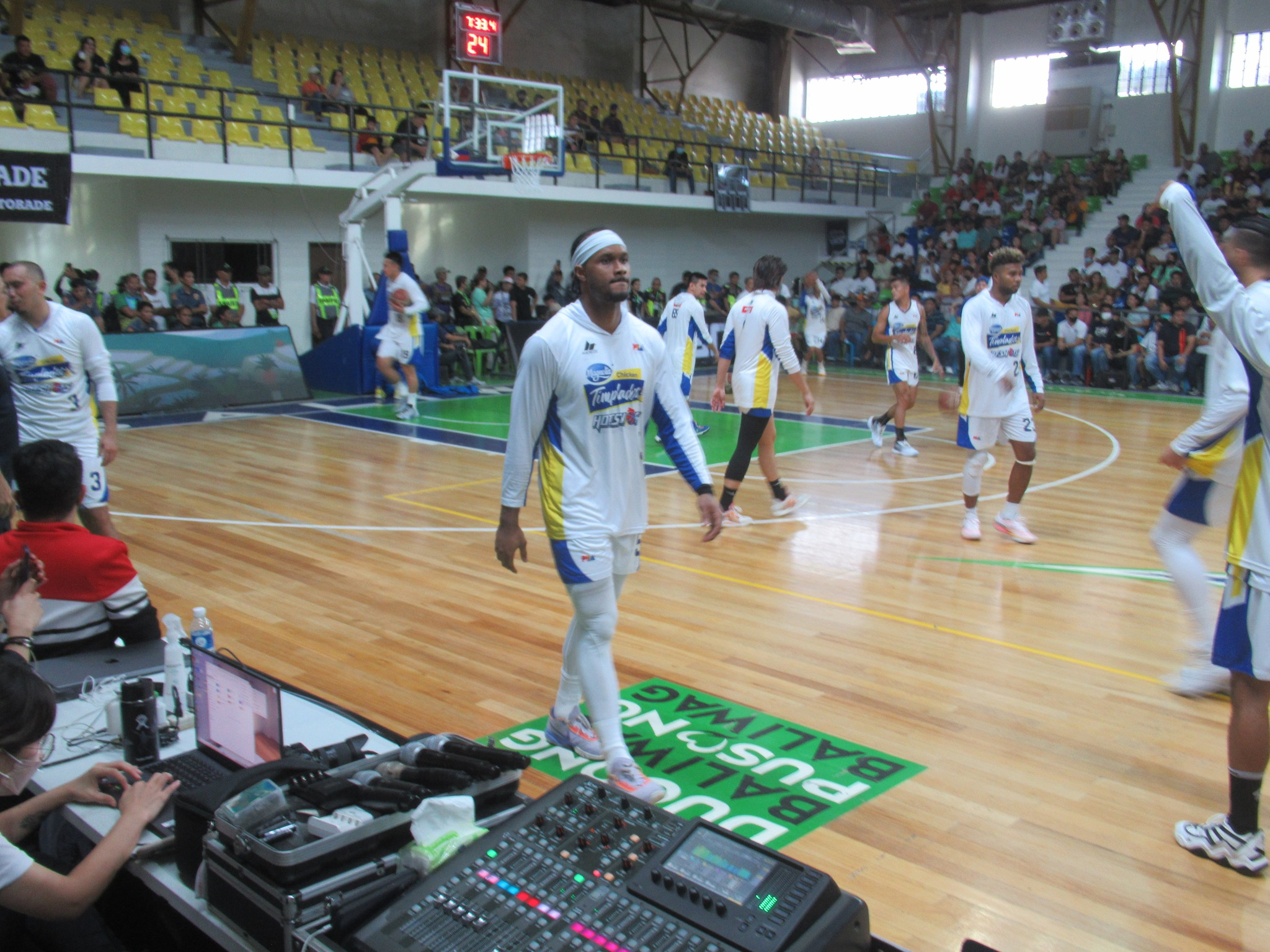
Tratter in 2023

Legend
GP	Games played	MPG	Minutes per game	FG%	Field-goal percentage
3FG%	3-point field-goal percentage	4P%	4-point field-goal percentage	FT%	Free-throw percentage
RPG	Rebounds per game	APG	Assists per game	SPG	Steals per game
BPG	Blocks per game	PPG	Points per game	127	Career high

As of the end of 2025–26 season

=== Season-by-season averages ===
Year	Team	GP	MPG	FG%	3P%	4P%	FT%	RPG	APG	SPG	BPG	PPG
2019	Blackwater	32	21.1	.476	.000	—	.535	5.2	.6	.8	.2	8.7
2019	Alaska	32	21.1	.476	.000	—	.535	5.2	.6	.8	.2	8.7
2020	Alaska	12	27.5	.544	—	—	.630	6.5	.4	.7	.2	10.6
2021	Alaska	24	29.0	.431	.000	—	.685	6.7	1.4	.5	.4	10.9
2022–23	Converge	33	21.7	.440	.281	—	.678	5.0	.7	.6	.4	7.6
2023–24	Magnolia	32	11.7	.513	—	—	.357	2.5	.3	.2	.0	2.8
2024–25	NorthPort	31	8.5	.426	.000	—	.667	2.0	.4	.1	.1	1.9
2024–25	Blackwater	31	8.5	.426	.000	—	.667	2.0	.4	.1	.1	1.9
2025–26	Blackwater	31	22.4	.517	.083	—	.631	5.0	.7	.4	.1	7.2
Career		194	19.2	.471	.179	—	.610	4.5	.6	.4	.2	6.6
