= PBA All-Rookie Team =

Annual Philippine Basketball Association (PBA) honor given since 2004-05 PBA season

The Philippine Basketball Association (PBA) All-Rookie Team is an annual Philippine Basketball Association (PBA) honor given since the 2004–05 PBA season, to the top rookie(s) of the season. Each All-Rookie Team consists of two backcourt (guards) and frontcourt (forwards or centers or both) players.

Unlike the traditional player awards, which is given by the league, this citation is awarded by the PBA Press Corps.

== Selections ==
^	Denotes players who are still active in the PBA
*	Denotes players inducted to the PBA Hall of Fame
**Player** (in bold text)	Indicates the player who won the Rookie of the Year award
Player (in italic text)	Indicates the player who was drafted first overall

Season	Position	Players	Teams	Ref.
2004–05	Guard	Paul Artadi	Purefoods Tender Juicy Hotdogs	
2004–05	Guard	James Yap	Purefoods Tender Juicy Hotdogs	
2004–05	Center	Sonny Thoss	Alaska Aces	
2004–05	Forward	**Rich Alvarez**	Shell Turbo Chargers	
2004–05	Forward	Ranidel de Ocampo	FedEx Express	
2005–06	Guard	Denok Miranda	Coca-Cola Tigers	
2005–06	Guard	**Larry Fonacier**	Red Bull Barako	
2005–06	Center	Paolo Bugia	Red Bull Barako	
2005–06	Forward	Leo Najorda	Red Bull Barako	
2005–06	Forward	KG Canaleta	Air21 Express	
2006–07	Guard	LA Tenorio^	San Miguel Beermen	
2006–07	Guard	Jireh Ibañes	Welcoat Dragons	
2006–07	Center	Jay-R Reyes	Welcoat Dragons	
2006–07	Forward	**Kelly Williams**^	Sta. Lucia Realtors	
2006–07	Forward	Arwind Santos	Air21 Express	
2007–08	Guard	**Ryan Reyes**	Sta. Lucia	
2007–08	Guard	Chico Lañete	Purefoods Tender Juicy Giants	
2007–08	Guard	Ronjay Buenafe	Coca-Cola Tigers	
2007–08	Forward	Joe Devance	Welcoat Dragons	
2007–08	Forward	Doug Kramer	Air21 Express	
2008–09	Guard	Sol Mercado	Rain or Shine Elasto Painters	
2008–09	Guard	Bonbon Custodio	San Miguel Beermen	
2008–09	Forward	Larry Rodriguez	Barako Bull Energy Boosters	
2008–09	Forward	**Gabe Norwood**	Rain or Shine Elasto Painters	
2008–09	Forward	Jared Dillinger	Talk 'N Text Tropang Texters	
2009–10	Guard	Josh Urbiztondo	Sta. Lucia Realtors	
2009–10	Guard	Rogemar Menor	Barako Bull Energy Boosters	
2009–10	Forward	Jervy Cruz	Rain or Shine Elasto Painters	
2009–10	Forward	**Rico Maierhofer**	Purefoods TJ Giants	
2009–10	Forward	Ronnie Matias	Rain or Shine Elasto Painters	
2010–11	Guard	Rob Labagala	Barangay Ginebra Kings	
2010–11	Guard	John Wilson	Barangay Ginebra Kings	
2010–11	Center	**Rabeh Al-Hussaini**	Petron Blaze Boosters	
2010–11	Forward	Nonoy Baclao	Petron Blaze Boosters	
2010–11	Forward	Sean Anthony	Powerade Tigers	
2011–12	Guard	**Paul Lee**^	Rain or Shine Elasto Painters	
2011–12	Guard	JVee Casio	Powerade Tigers	
2011–12	Forward	James Sena	Air21 Express	
2011–12	Forward	Marcio Lassiter^	Petron Blaze Boosters	
2011–12	Forward	Dylan Ababou	Barangay Ginebra Kings	
2012–13	Guard	Chris Tiu	Rain or Shine Elasto Painters	
2012–13	Guard	Alex Mallari	San Mig Coffee Mixers	
2012–13	Center	June Mar Fajardo^	Petron Blaze Boosters	
2012–13	Forward	**Calvin Abueva**^	Alaska Aces	
2012–13	Forward	Cliff Hodge^	Meralco Bolts	
2013–14	Guard	Terrence Romeo	GlobalPort Batang Pier	
2013–14	Guard	Justin Melton	San Mig Super Coffee Mixers	
2013–14	Center	**Greg Slaughter**	Barangay Ginebra San Miguel	
2013–14	Forward	Raymond Almazan^	Rain or Shine Elasto Painters	
2013–14	Forward	Ian Sangalang^	San Mig Super Coffee Mixers	
2014–15	Guard	**Stanley Pringle**^	GlobalPort Batang Pier	
2014–15	Guard	Chris Banchero^	Alaska Aces	
2014–15	Center	Jake Pascual	Barako Bull Energy	
2014–15	Forward	Jericho Cruz^	Rain or Shine Elasto Painters	
2014–15	Forward	Matt Ganuelas-Rosser	TNT Tropang Texters	
2015–16	Guard	**Chris Newsome**^	Meralco Bolts	
2015–16	Guard	Scottie Thompson^	Barangay Ginebra San Miguel	
2015–16	Guard	Maverick Ahanmisi^	Rain or Shine Elasto Painters	
2015–16	Forward	Troy Rosario^	TNT KaTropa	
2015–16	Forward	Arthur dela Cruz	Blackwater Elite	
2016–17	Guard	Jio Jalalon^	Star Hotshots	
2016–17	Guard	Reden Celda	Kia Picanto	
2016–17	Forward	Kevin Ferrer^	Barangay Ginebra San Miguel	
2016–17	Forward	**Roger Pogoy**^	TNT KaTropa	
2016–17	Forward	Matthew Wright	Phoenix Fuel Masters	
2017–18	Guard	Paul Zamar^	Blackwater Elite	
2017–18	Guard	Jeron Teng^	Alaska Aces	
2017–18	Center	Christian Standhardinger	San Miguel Beermen	
2017–18	Forward	**Jason Perkins**^	Phoenix Fuel Masters	
2017–18	Forward	Robbie Herndon^	Magnolia Hotshots	
2019	Guard	**CJ Perez**^	Columbian Dyip	
2019	Guard	Robert Bolick^	NorthPort Batang Pier	
2019	Center	Abu Tratter^	Alaska Aces	
2019	Forward	Bobby Ray Parks Jr.	TNT KaTropa	
2019	Forward	Javee Mocon^	Rain or Shine Elasto Painters	
2020	Guard	**Aaron Black**^	Meralco Bolts	
2020	Guard	Renzo Subido	NorthPort Batang Pier	
2020	Center	Barkley Eboña	Alaska Aces	
2020	Forward	Roosevelt Adams	Terrafirma Dyip	
2020	Forward	Arvin Tolentino	Barangay Ginebra San Miguel	
2021	Guard	**Mikey Williams**^	TNT Tropang Giga	
2021	Guard	Joshua Munzon^	Terrafirma Dyip	
2021	Forward	Leonard Santillan^	Rain or Shine Elasto Painters	
2021	Forward	Calvin Oftana^	NLEX Road Warriors	
2021	Forward	Jamie Malonzo	NorthPort Batang Pier	
2022–23	Guard	Encho Serrano	Phoenix Super LPG Fuel Masters	
2022–23	Guard	Tyler Tio^	Phoenix Super LPG Fuel Masters	
2022–23	Center	**Justin Arana**^	Converge FiberXers	
2022–23	Forward	Brandon Ganuelas-Rosser^	NLEX Road Warriors	
2022–23	Forward	Ato Ular^	Blackwater Bossing	
2023–24	Guard	**Stephen Holt**^	Terrafirma Dyip	
2023–24	Guard	Adrian Nocum^	Rain or Shine Elasto Painters	
2023–24	Center	Kemark Cariño^	Terrafirma Dyip	
2023–24	Forward	Cade Flores^	NorthPort Batang Pier	
2023–24	Forward	Kenneth Tuffin^	Phoenix Fuel Masters	
2024–25	Guard	**RJ Abarrientos**^	Barangay Ginebra San Miguel	
2024–25	Guard	Sedrick Barefield^	Blackwater Bossing	
2024–25	Guard	Jordan Heading^	TNT Tropang 5G	
2024–25	Center	Justine Baltazar^	Converge FiberXers	
2024–25	Forward	Caelan Tiongson^	Rain or Shine Elasto Painters	
2024–25	Forward	Kai Ballungay^	Phoenix Fuel Masters	
