= 2021 Chooks-to-Go Pilipinas 3x3 season =

- League: Chooks-to-Go Pilipinas 3x3
- Sport: 3x3 basketball
- Number of teams: 12

Invitational
- Champions: Manila
- Runners-up: Pasig

Seasons
- ← 2020–21

The 2021 Chooks-to-Go Pilipinas 3x3 season is the third season of the Chooks-to-Go Pilipinas 3x3 basketball league. The season only consist of a one-day invitational tournament. The tournament was won by Manila HeiHei.

== Venue ==
The invitational tournament was held at the Laus Events Center in San Fernando, Pampanga.

== Teams ==
The following teams took part in the invitational tournament.

- Manila HeiHei
- Pacquiao Coffee Bacolod
- BRT Sumisip Basilan
- Homegrown Grains Bocaue
- AMACOR Mandaluyong
- RBR Cabiao Nueva Ecija
- Pasig Kingpins
- Adam Esli Pasay
- MNL Kingpin Quezon City
- Essen Immunoboost Sarangani
- Zamboanga Valientes
- ARQ Builders Cebu

Manila HeiHei is the same team as Manila Chooks which takes part in the FIBA 3x3 Men's Pro Circuit.

== Tournament ==
The invitational tournament was held on October 20, 2021. The 3×3 World Tour format was adopted with the participating teams allocated to groups of three in the first round. The top two teams in each group advanced to the knockout playoffs. Teams are permitted to have foreign players in their rosters. Manila HeiHei won 21–6 over the Pasig Kingpins in the final. Essen Immunoboost Sarangani finished third.

Date	Final			Winning players
Date	Champions	Score	Runner-up	Winning players
October 20	Manila	21–6	Pasig	Chico Lanete; Ryan Monteclaro; Mike Nzeusseu; Nikki Monteclaro; Mac Tallo

== Imports ==
Foreign players or imports are allowed to take part in the tournament. Imports were permitted to play to accommodate foreign student-athletes who had been inactive and/or stranded in the country due to the COVID-19 pandemic.

Team	Name
BRT Sumisip Basilan	(Cameroon) Hamadou Laminou
ARQ Builders Cebu	(Cameroon) Frederick Elombi
ARQ Builders Cebu	(Cameroon) Landry Sanjo
Manila HeiHei	(Nigeria) Henry Iloka
RBR Cabiao Nueva Ecija	(Cameroon) Hamadou Laminou
Pasig Kingpins	(Nigeria) Eugene Toba
Essen Immunoboost Sarangani	(Cameroon) Chibueze Ikeh
