= List of 2022–23 PBA season transactions =

This is a list of transactions that have taken place during the off-season and the 2022–23 PBA season.

== Retirement ==
Date	Name	Team(s) played (years)	Age	Notes	Ref.
June 1	Joe Devance	Welcoat Dragons (2007–2008); Alaska Aces (2008–2011); B-Meg Llamados / San Mig Coffee Mixers / San Mig Super Coffee Mixers / Purefoods Star Hotshots / Star Hotshots (2011–2015); Barangay Ginebra San Miguel (2015–2022)	40		
June 7	Andre Paras	Blackwater Bossing (2021)	26		
September 19	Paul Desiderio	Blackwater Elite/Bossing (2019–2022)	25		
January 7	Larry Fonacier	Red Bull Barako (2005–2007); Magnolia Beverage Masters (2007–2008); Alaska Aces (2008–2010); Talk 'N Text Tropang Texters / TNT Tropang Texters / Tropang TNT / TNT KaTropa (2010–2017); NLEX Road Warriors (2017–2022)	40	Fonacier became the team manager of the NLEX Road Warriors.	

== Coaching changes ==
=== In-season ===
Departure date	Team	Outgoing head coach	Reason for departure	Hire date	Incoming head coach	Last coaching position	Ref.
August 9	Converge FiberXers	Jeffrey Cariaso	Released	August 10	Aldin Ayo	Chooks-to-Go 3x3 pro circuit teams head coach (2020–2022)	
September 2	NLEX Road Warriors	Yeng Guiao	End of contract	September 9	Adonis Tierra (interim)	NLEX assistant coach (2014–2022)	
September 5	Rain or Shine Elasto Painters	Chris Gavina	Demoted to assistant coach	September 5	Yeng Guiao	NLEX head coach (2016–2022)	
September 21	NLEX Road Warriors	Adonis Tierra (interim)	Demoted to assistant coach	September 21	Frankie Lim	Perpetual Altas head coach (2018–2020)	
December 31	Phoenix Super LPG Fuel Masters	Topex Robinson	End of contract	January 12	Jamike Jarin (interim)	Phoenix assistant coach (2020–2022)	
January 2	TNT Tropang Giga	Chot Reyes	Focusing on the Philippines national team	January 2	Jojo Lastimosa	Bataan Risers head coach (2018–2019)	
January 13	NorthPort Batang Pier	Pido Jarencio	Assigned as NorthPort's team manager	January 13	Bonnie Tan (interim)	Letran Knights head coach (2019–present)	
January 21	San Miguel Beermen	Leo Austria	Taking a sabbatical	January 21	Jorge Gallent	San Miguel assistant coach (2011–2022)	

== Player movements ==
=== Trades ===
May
May 17	To Converge FiberXers: Tyrus Hill; David Murrell	To NLEX Road Warriors: 2023 (S48) Converge first-round pick
May 17	To Barangay Ginebra San Miguel: Jeremiah Gray	To Terrafirma Dyip: Brian Enriquez; Javi Gómez de Liaño
May 21	To Blackwater Bossing: Yousef Taha	To Converge FiberXers: Kurt Lojera
June
June 3	To Barangay Ginebra San Miguel: 2023 (S48) NorthPort second-round pick	To NorthPort Batang Pier: MJ Ayaay
June 6	To Converge FiberXers: 2024 (S49) San Miguel second-round pick; 2025 (S50) San Miguel second-round pick	To San Miguel Beermen: Robbie Herndon
June 7	To Phoenix Super LPG Fuel Masters: Javee Mocon	To Rain or Shine Elasto Painters: Nick Demusis; 2023 (S48) Phoenix first-round pick; 2024 (S49) Phoenix second-round pick
September
September 9	To Converge FiberXers: Aljun Melecio; Kris Porter	To Phoenix Super LPG Fuel Masters: Ben Adamos; Kurt Lojera
September 19	Three-team trade	
September 19	To Blackwater Bossing: Gab Banal (from TNT); Troy Rosario (from TNT)	To NLEX Road Warriors: Brandon Ganuelas-Rosser (from Blackwater); 2023 (S48) NorthPort second-round pick (from Blackwater); 2027 (S51) Blackwater second-round pick
September 19	To TNT Tropang Giga: Calvin Oftana (from NLEX); Raul Soyud (from NLEX)	
September 20	To Barangay Ginebra San Miguel: Jamie Malonzo	To NorthPort Batang Pier: Prince Caperal; Arvin Tolentino; 2023 (S48) Barangay Ginebra first-round pick
September 20	Three-team trade	
September 20	To Barangay Ginebra San Miguel: Von Pessumal (from San Miguel)	To NorthPort Batang Pier: Jeff Chan (from Barangay Ginebra); Kent Salado (from Barangay Ginebra)
September 20	To San Miguel Beermen: 2025 (S50) NorthPort second-round pick; 2027 (S51) NorthPort second-round pick	
January
January 3	To Blackwater Bossing: Michael DiGregorio; Tyrus Hill; RK Ilagan	To Converge FiberXers: Barkley Eboña; 2023 (S48) TNT first-round pick
January 4	To Converge FiberXers: Jerrick Balanza	To NorthPort Batang Pier: Allyn Bulanadi
January 5	To NorthPort Batang Pier: Paul Zamar; 2027 (S51) San Miguel second-round pick	To San Miguel Beermen: Allyn Bulanadi
January 12	To NorthPort Batang Pier: Joshua Munzon	To Terrafirma Dyip: Kevin Ferrer
January 18	Three-team trade	
January 18	To NLEX Road Warriors: Sean Anthony (from Phoenix); Jake Pascual (from Phoenix)	To Phoenix Super LPG Fuel Masters: Jjay Alejandro (from TNT); Raul Soyud (from TNT); 2023 (S48) NLEX highest second-round pick (Note: NLEX's highest pick is acquired from a previous trade with Blackwater.); 2028 (S52) TNT second-round pick
January 18	To TNT Tropang Giga: Justin Chua (from NLEX); Paul Varilla (from NLEX)	

=== Free agency ===
==== Signings ====
Player	Date signed	Contract amount	Contract length	New team	Former team	Ref
Allyn Bulanadi	April 27	Not disclosed	2 years	Converge FiberXers	Alaska Aces	
Kevin Racal	April 27	Not disclosed	1 year	Converge FiberXers	Alaska Aces	
Alec Stockton	May 2	Not disclosed	2 years	Converge FiberXers	Alaska Aces	
RK Ilagan	May 2	Not disclosed	1 year	Converge FiberXers	Alaska Aces	
Michael DiGregorio	May 12	Not disclosed	2 years	Converge FiberXers	Alaska Aces	
Mike Tolomia	May 12	Not disclosed	Not disclosed	Converge FiberXers	Alaska Aces	
Jerrick Balanza	May 14	Not disclosed	2 years	NorthPort Batang Pier	NorthPort Batang Pier	
Arwind Santos	May 19	Not disclosed	1 year	NorthPort Batang Pier	NorthPort Batang Pier	
Renzo Subido	May 19	Not disclosed	Not disclosed	NorthPort Batang Pier	NorthPort Batang Pier	
Louie Vigil	May 19	Not disclosed	1 year	NorthPort Batang Pier	San Miguel Beermen (PBA 3x3)	
Nick Demusis	May 20	Not disclosed	1 year	Phoenix Super LPG Fuel Masters		
Yousef Taha	May 23	Not disclosed	1 year	Blackwater Bossing	Blackwater Bossing	
Rey Publico	May 23	Not disclosed	1 year	Blackwater Bossing	Alaska Aces	
Aaron Black	May 24	Not disclosed	2 years	Meralco Bolts	Meralco Bolts	
Kyle Pascual	May 26	Not disclosed	2 years	Meralco Bolts	Terrafirma Dyip	
Jeff Chan	May 27	Not disclosed	1 year	Barangay Ginebra San Miguel		
Roi Sumang	May 28	Not disclosed	1 year	NorthPort Batang Pier		
Renzo Subido	May 28	Not disclosed	1 year	NorthPort Batang Pier		
Loren Brill	May 29	Not disclosed	1 year	Magnolia Chicken Timplados Hotshots		
Ronnie de Leon	May 29	Not disclosed	1 year	Magnolia Chicken Timplados Hotshots		
Jamie Malonzo	May 30	Not disclosed	1 year	NorthPort Batang Pier		
Michael Cañete	May 31	Not disclosed	1 year	San Miguel Beermen	Meralco Bolts	
Jeepy Faundo	May 31	Not disclosed	1 year	San Miguel Beermen	NorthPort Batang Pier (PBA 3x3)	
Chris Javier	June 3	Not disclosed	Not disclosed	NorthPort Batang Pier	TNT Tropang Giga (PBA 3x3)	
Robbie Herndon	June 6	Not disclosed	1 year	Converge FiberXers	Alaska Aces	
Maverick Ahanmisi	June 6	Not disclosed	1 year	Converge FiberXers	Alaska Aces	
Javee Mocon	June 7	Not disclosed	3 years	Phoenix Super LPG Fuel Masters		
Abu Tratter	June 15	Not disclosed	Not disclosed	Converge FiberXers	Alaska Aces	
Paolo Javelona	July 15	Not disclosed	1 year	Terrafirma Dyip	Purefoods TJ Titans (PBA 3x3)	
Mikey Williams	July 26	Not disclosed	3 years	TNT Tropang Giga		
David Murrell	September 20	Not disclosed	2 years	Converge FiberXers		
Trevis Jackson	September 20	Not disclosed	Not disclosed	Blackwater Bossing	Rain or Shine Elasto Painters	
Calvin Oftana	October 4	Not disclosed	3 years	TNT Tropang Giga		
Reden Celda	October 6	Not disclosed	1 conference	NLEX Road Warriors	Zamboanga Family's Brand Sardines (MPBL)	
Jewel Ponferada	October 8	Not disclosed	2 years	Rain or Shine Elasto Painters		
Jayson Castro	October 13	₱420,000 per month (max. contract)	3 years	TNT Tropang Giga		
William Navarro	October 24	Not disclosed	2 conferences	NorthPort Batang Pier	—	
Don Trollano	December 26	Not disclosed	2 years	NLEX Road Warriors		
Michael Miranda	December 26	Not disclosed	1 year	NLEX Road Warriors		
Baser Amer	December 29	Not disclosed	1 year	Blackwater Bossing		
Juami Tiongson	January 4	Not disclosed	2 years	Terrafirma Dyip		
James Yap	January 6	Not disclosed	1 conference	Rain or Shine Elasto Painters		
Ed Daquioag	January 13	Not disclosed	1 year	Terrafirma Dyip		
JP Calvo	January 13	Not disclosed	1 conference	Terrafirma Dyip		
Hesed Gabo	January 16	Not disclosed	1 year	NLEX Road Warriors	Nueva Ecija Rice Vanguards (MPBL)	
Clint Doliguez	January 16	Not disclosed	Not disclosed	NLEX Road Warriors	Pioneer ElastoSeal Katibays (PBA 3x3)	
Paul Zamar	January 17	Not disclosed	1 year	NorthPort Batang Pier	NorthPort Batang Pier	
Christian Balagasay	January 17	Not disclosed	Not disclosed	NorthPort Batang Pier	Terrafirma Dyip	
Jansen Rios	January 19	Not disclosed	1 year	Meralco Bolts	Phoenix Super LPG Fuel Masters	
Diego Dario	January 24	Not disclosed	1 conference	Meralco Bolts	Davao Occidental Tigers (PSL)	
Jollo Go	January 24	Not disclosed	Not disclosed	Phoenix Super LPG Fuel Masters	Blackwater Bossing	
Bradwyn Guinto	January 27	Not disclosed	2 conferences	Converge FiberXers	Rain or Shine Elasto Painters	
Robert Bolick	February 8	Not disclosed	1 conference	NorthPort Batang Pier		
Jared Dillinger	February 24	Not disclosed	Not disclosed	Barangay Ginebra San Miguel		
Jake Pascual	March 1	Not disclosed	2 years	NLEX Road Warriors		
Danny Ildefonso	March 2	Not disclosed	Rest of the season	Converge FiberXers	Retired (last played for the Meralco Bolts in 2015)	
Paul Varilla	March 15	Not disclosed	2 years	TNT Tropang Giga		
Player	Date signed	Contract amount	Contract length	New team	Former team	Ref

=== 3x3 ===
Player	Date	Movement	Mother team	3x3 team	Ref
Larry Fonacier	May 19	Promoted to mother team	NLEX Road Warriors	Cavitex Braves	
Bong Galanza	May 19	Assigned to 3x3 team	NLEX Road Warriors	Cavitex Braves	
Tzaddy Rangel	May 19	Assigned to 3x3 team	NLEX Road Warriors	Cavitex Braves	
Chris Exciminiano	May 19	Assigned to 3x3 team	TNT Tropang Giga	TNT Tropang Giga	
Gryann Mendoza	May 19	Assigned to 3x3 team	TNT Tropang Giga	TNT Tropang Giga	
Riego Gamalinda	May 19	Assigned to 3x3 team	San Miguel Beermen	San Miguel Beermen	
Wendell Comboy	May 19	Assigned to 3x3 team	San Miguel Beermen	San Miguel Beermen	
Nico Salva	May 19	Assigned to 3x3 team	Phoenix Super LPG Fuel Masters	Limitless Appmasters	
Marion Magat	January 18	Assigned to 3x3 team	NLEX Road Warriors	Cavitex Braves	

== 2022 PBA draft ==
The PBA season 47 draft was held on May 15, 2022, at Robinsons Place Manila in Manila. A total of 52 amateur players were selected in six rounds of draft.

Round	Pick	Player	Date signed	Contract length	Team (Note: Team denotes the team that holds the players' draft rights at the time of contract signing. Teams in parentheses denotes the teams that drafted the players before any trade or free agent signing occurred)	Ref
1	1	Brandon Ganuelas-Rosser	May 26	3 years	Blackwater Bossing	
1	3	Jeo Ambohot	May 27	3 years	Converge FiberXers	
1	4	Justin Arana	May 25	2 years	Converge FiberXers	
1	5	Gian Mamuyac	May 23	2 years	Rain or Shine Elasto Painters	
1	6	JM Calma	May 19	2 years	NorthPort Batang Pier	
1	7	Tyrus Hill	June 2	2 years	Converge FiberXers (rights acquired from NLEX)	
1	8	Javi Gómez de Liaño	May 25	2 years	Terrafirma Dyip (rights acquired from Barangay Ginebra)	
1	9	Kurt Lojera	May 25	1 year	Converge FiberXers (rights acquired from Blackwater)	
1	10	Shaun Ildefonso	May 23	2 years	Rain or Shine Elasto Painters	
1	11	Mark Dyke	May 23	1 year	Blackwater Bossing	
2	13	Ato Ular	May 23	2 years	Blackwater Bossing	
2	14	Tyler Tio	May 25	2 years	Phoenix Super LPG Fuel Masters	
2	16	Chris Lalata	May 25	1 year	Phoenix Super LPG Fuel Masters	
2	17	Jhonard Clarito	May 23	2 years	Rain or Shine Elasto Painters	
2	19	Encho Serrano	May 25	1 year	Phoenix Super LPG Fuel Masters	
3	27	Jollo Go	July 21	Rest of the year	Blackwater Bossing (drafted by Converge but left unsigned)	
3	30	John Apacible	May 28	1 year	NorthPort Batang Pier	
