= 2019 Chooks-to-Go Pilipinas 3x3 season =

- League: Chooks-to-Go Pilipinas 3x3
- Sport: 3x3 basketball
- Teams: 12–13

President's Cup
- Champions: Pasig (1st title)
- Runners-up: Bataan

Patriot's Cup
- Champions: Basilan (1st title)
- Runners-up: Balanga

Magiting Cup
- Champions: Balanga (1st title)
- Runners-up: Pasig

Seasons
- 2020–21 →

The 2019 Chooks-to-Go Pilipinas 3x3 season is the inaugural season of the Chooks-to-Go Pilipinas 3x3 basketball league.

== Teams ==
12 teams, many of which are from the Maharlika Pilipinas Basketball League (MPBL), participated in the inaugural conference.

For the Patriot's Cup, the second conference two foreign teams were invited to participate, VetHealth-Delhi 3BL from India and Moscow Inanomo from Russia. However Moscow will start playing in the second leg of the conference. The Thunder Pateros Hunters played in lieu of the Marikina Shoemasters in the first leg as a guest team.

Teams can name up to six players in their rosters for each conference but can opt not to fill up all six slots right away. However they cannot replace any player.

Team	President's	Patriot's	Magiting
Bacoor Strikers	Yes		
Phenom-Basilan Steel		Yes	
1Bataan Risers / Wilkins Balanga Pure	Yes	Yes	
Bicol Volcanoes			Yes
Bulacan Kuyas	Yes		
Inoza-Gulf Supreme Bulacan Boosters		Yes	
Cebu-Max 4 Birada	Yes	Yes	
VetHealth-Delhi 3BL (India)		Yes	
Marikina Shoemasters	Yes	Yes (except 1st leg)	
Mindoro Tamaraws		Yes	Yes
Moscow Inanomo (Russia)		Yes (except 1st leg)	
Pasig Grindhouse Kings / Gold's Gym-Pasig King	Yes	Yes	
Pasay Voyagers	Yes		
Southwestern University Cobras		Yes	
Thunder Pateros Hunters		Yes (1st leg guest team)	
Quezon City-Zark's Jawbreakers	Yes		
Tycoon-Quezon City Ballers		Yes	
San Juan-Go for Gold Knights	Yes		
Valenzuela Classic	Yes		
Vigan Wolves / MiGuard-Vigan Wolves	Yes	Yes	
Zamboanga Valientes / Zamboanga Valientes MLV	Yes	Yes	Yes

== Pre-season events ==
=== Manok ng Bayan-SBP 3X3 ===
The Manok ng Bayan-SBP 3X3, a basketball youth tournament for boys and girls was held in Cebu as the official kickoff event of the 2019 Chooks-to-Go Pilipinas 3x3 season. The event was an attempt to break the record for the biggest FIBA-sanctioned youth tournament by participants, as well as to accumulate FIBA Federation Ranking points for the Philippines in order for the country to gain enough points to qualify to send a team to the 3x3 event at 2020 Summer Olympics.

== 2019 President's Cup ==
The President's Cup is the first conference of the Chooks-to-Go Pilipinas 3x3 season. The conference is exclusive to Filipinos and imports or foreigners are ineligible. However players of foreign descent who can prove their Filipino heritage are eligible to play. The conference consisted of five legs each considered as a separate tournament. A sixth leg, the Grand Finals, was planned but later scrapped.

The top placing team in the grand final qualifies for the FIBA 3x3 World Tour while the next top two teams gain a berth each at the inaugural Asia-Pacific Super Quest.

=== Leg venues and winners ===
Leg		Date	Venue	Final			Winning players
Leg		Date	Venue	Champions	Score	Runner-up	Winning players
1	1st Tour	February 16	SM Megamall (Mandaluyong)	Bataan	19–18	Pasig	Alvin Pasaol; Santi Santillan; Sean Manganti; Anton Asistio
2	2nd Tour	February 24	SM Megamall (Mandaluyong)	Pasig	21–18	Bataan	Dylan Ababou; Joshua Munzon; Troy Rike; Taylor Statham
3	3rd Tour	March 1	SM Fairview (Quezon City)	Bataan	21–19	Pasig	Alvin Pasaol; Santi Santillan; Chito Jaime; Anton Asistio
4	4th Tour	March 9	SM Megamall (Mandaluyong)	Pasig	14–12	Pasay	Taylor Statham; Troy Rike; Joshua Munzon; Dylan Ababou (Note: Ababou, who is part of Pasig's roster for the 4th Tour, didn't play for Pasig in the tour final after being injured in the middle of the tournament rendering him unavailable for the semifinals and onwards.)
5	5th Tour	March 31	SM Fairview (Quezon City)	Pasig	14–12	Bataan	Taylor Statham; Troy Rike; Joshua Munzon

== 2019 Patriot's Cup ==
The Patriot's Cup (also known as 2019 Chooks-to-Go Pilipinas 3x3 Patriot's Cup presented by Coca-Cola for sponsorship reasons) is the second conference of the Chooks-to-Go Pilipinas 3x3 league. Unlike the President's Cup, the tournament as a reinforced conference allows each of the participating teams to field a single foreign import. The conference will feature at least five legs with a Super Quest tournament possibly to be held as the sixth leg. The conference is set to commence on June 16, 2019 with the first leg scheduled be held in Cebu.

All of the twelve teams which played in the first conference will play in the Patriot's Cup with four or eight teams being considered to be allowed to make their debut in this conference. This includes two foreign teams each from Indonesia and Japan.

=== Leg venues and winners ===
Leg		Date	Venue	Final			Winning players
Leg		Date	Venue	Champions	Score	Runner-up	Winning players
1	1st Tour	June 16	SM Seaside City Cebu (Cebu)	Gold's Gym-Pasig Kings (Pasig)	21–15	Phenom Basilan CTC Construction (Basilan)	(Philippines) Dylan Ababou; (Philippines) (United States) Joshua Munzon; (Serbia) Nikola Pavlović; (Philippines) (United States) Taylor Statham
2	2nd Tour	June 23	SM Fairview (Quezon City)	VetHealth Delhi 3BL (India)	21–20	Phenom Basilan CTC Construction (Basilan)	(India) Inderbir Sing Gill; (India) Bikramjil Gill; (India) Kiram Shastri; (India) Amjyot Singh Gil
3	3rd Tour	July 6	SM Muntinlupa	Phenom Basilan CTC Construction (Basilan)	21–16	Wilkins Balanga Pure (Balanga)	(Philippines) (United States) Franky Johnson; (Philippines) (United States) Troy Rike; (Philippines) Gab Dagangon; (United States) Marcus Hammonds II
4	4th Tour	July 13	SM Megamall	Wilkins Balanga Pure (Balanga)	21–17	Gold's Gym-Pasig Kings (Pasig)	(Philippines) Alvin Pasaol; (Philippines) Leonard Santillan; (Philippines) (United States) Karl Dehesa; (Nigeria) Prince Orizu
5	5th Tour	July 27	SM Megamall	Phenom Basilan CTC Construction (Basilan)	21–20	Wilkins Balanga Pure (Balanga)	(Philippines) (United States) Franky Johnson; (Philippines) (United States) Troy Rike; (Philippines) (United States) Roosevelt Adams; (United States) Marcus Hammonds II

== 2019 Magiting Cup ==
The Magiting Cup (also known as 2019 Chooks-to-Go Pilipinas 3x3 Magiting Cup presented by Coca-Cola for sponsorship reasons) is the third conference of the Chooks-to-Go Pilipinas 3x3 league.

=== Leg venues and winners ===
Leg		Date	Venue	Final			Winning players
Leg		Date	Venue	Champions	Score	Runner-up	Winning players
1	1st Tour	September 1	SM City Clark (Angeles, Pampanga)	Wilkins Balanga Pure (Balanga)	21–20	Phenom Basilan CTC Construction (Basilan)	Chris de Chavez; Karl Dehesa; Alvin Pasaol; Leonard Santillan
2	2nd Tour	September 6	SM Fairview (Quezon City)	Fyr Fyter Bacolod (Bacolod)	21–19	Mindoro Tamaraws 7A (Mindoro)	Adrian Celada; Mark dela Cruz; Louie Medalla; Mark Yee
3	3rd Tour	September 10	SM BF Parañaque (Parañaque)	Wilkins Balanga Pure (Balanga)	21–20	Equalivet Pasig (Pasig)	Chris de Chavez; Karl Dehesa; Alvin Pasaol; Leonard Santillan
4	4th Tour	September 15	SM BF Parañaque (Parañaque)	Equalivet Pasig (Pasig)	21–18	Wilkins Balanga Pure (Balanga)	Dylan Ababou; JR Alabanza; Leo De Vera; Joshua Munzon
5	5th Tour	September 20	SM Megamall (Mandaluyong)	Wilkins Balanga Pure (Balanga)	21–19	Equalivet Pasig (Pasig)	Chris de Chavez; Karl Dehesa; Alvin Pasaol; Leonard Santillan

== MelMac Cup ==
In addition to the three regular conference, Chooks-to-Go Pilipinas also organized the MelMac Cup. The MelMac Cup had two tournaments or "seasons", each with multiple legs. Wilkins Balanga Pure is the winner of Season 2 which ended on 31 October 2019. Pasig was the winner of the first season which concluded on 22 October 2019. The first season also featured a women's tournament which had Ever Bilena as winners.
