= Alvin Pasaol =

Filipino basketball player (born 1995)

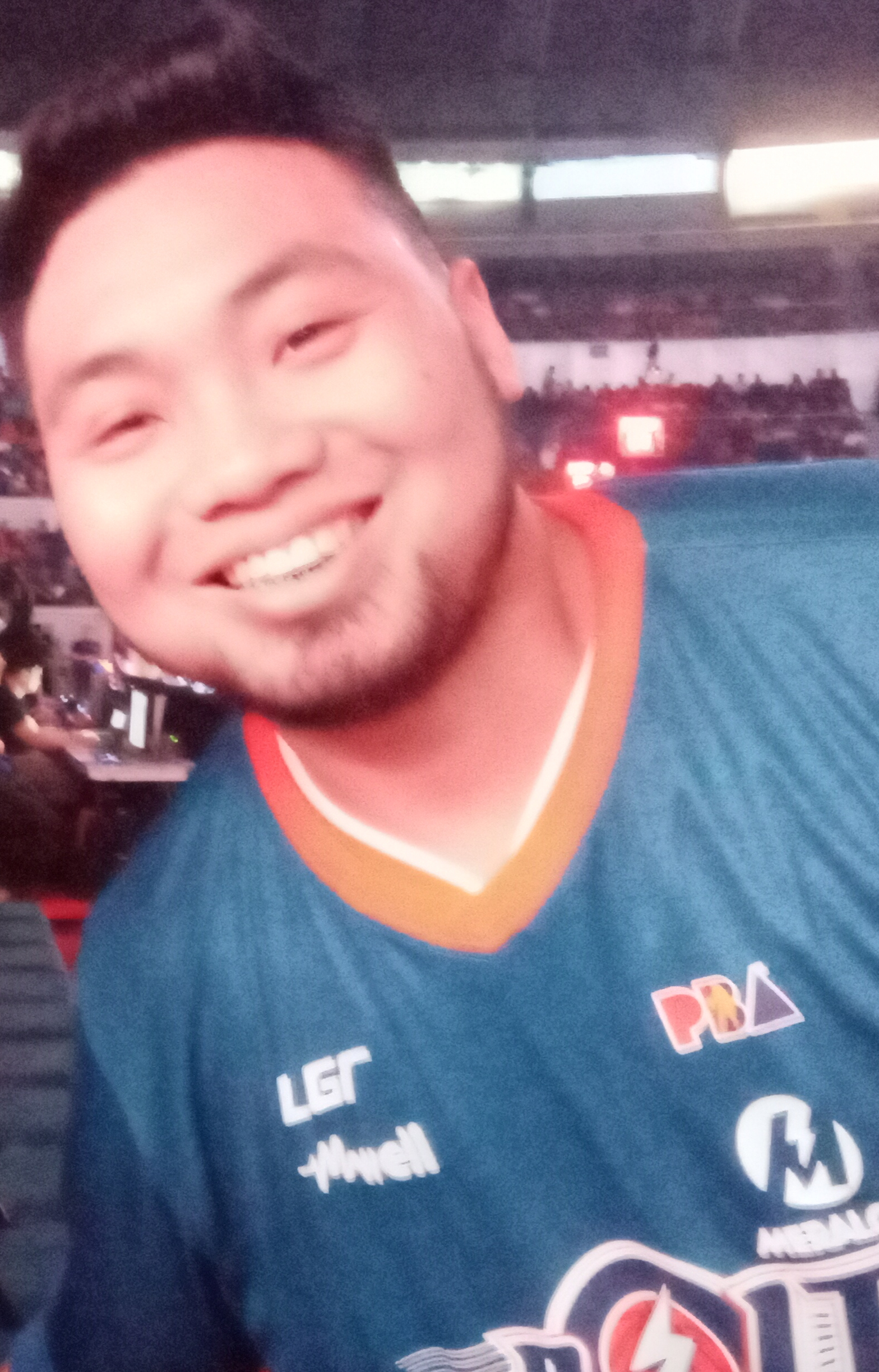
- Pasaol in 2024

No. 8 – Marikina Shoemasters
- Position: Small forward / power forward
- League: MPBL

Personal information
- Born: May 6, 1995 (age 31) Davao City, Philippines
- Listed height: 6 ft 2 in (1.88 m)
- Listed weight: 200 lb (91 kg)

Career information
- High school: Assumption College of Davao (Davao City)
- College: Holy Cross of Davao College; UE (2016–2018)
- PBA draft: 2020: 1st round9th overall (Note: The 2021 draft was composed of two drafts: the Gilas special round, which consists of 4 players reserved for the Gilas Pilipinas program, and the regular draft. Pasaol was selected as the 9th pick of the regular draft.)
- Drafted by: Meralco Bolts
- Playing career: 2019–present

Career history
- 2019: Bataan Risers
- 2019–2020: Zamboanga Family's Brand Sardines
- 2021–2025: Meralco Bolts
- 2026: Parañaque Patriots
- 2026–present: Marikina Shoemasters

Career highlights
- PBA champion (2024 Philippine); MPBL All-Star (2020); 2× UAAP Mythical Team (2017, 2018)

Alvin Pasaol (born May 6, 1995) is a Filipino professional basketball player for the Marikina Shoemasters of the Maharlika Pilipinas Basketball League (MPBL).

== Early life ==
Pasaol's father is a former city hall employee and his mother, a housewife, in Davao. He has a younger brother, John Rey, who is currently playing for the FEU Tamaraws. He played for Assumption College in his high school years.

== College career ==
=== Holy Cross of Davao College ===
Pasaol was highly recruited out of high school. He first played for the Holy Cross of Davao College Crusaders in the Davao City Collegiate League.

=== University of the East ===
Pasaol chose to play for the UE Red Warriors after their coach, Derrick Pumaren, visited him and his family in Davao. Coach Pumaren was impressed by his scoring ability and rebounding. After serving a one-year residency, he had an impressive stint in the Filoil Flying V Preseason Cup. He made his UAAP debut against the NU Bulldogs with 10 points, but on 2 out of 14 shooting. After struggling in his first few games, he scored 22 points in a loss to the Ateneo Blue Eagles. In his rookie season, he averaged 11 points, 5.4 rebounds, and 1.6 assists per game.

Before his second season, he was invited to join the La Salle Green Archers, but he declined. In Season 80, Pasaol scored a career-high 49 points against the Archers. This was the highest individual score in the league since Jeff Napa of NU scored 43 points in 2002. This was also the most scored by a UE player, beating Allan Caidic's 46 points. He achieved this feat despite an injured right ankle while also grabbing eight rebounds and four steals. The Red Warriors got their first win that season against the UST Growling Tigers, in which he scored 32 points. For those performances, he won Player of the Week. He got another Player of the Week award for scoring 32 against the UP Fighting Maroons. Unfortunately, the Red Warriors failed to make the Final Four. He did however, make it to the UAAP's Mythical Five, becoming the first Davaoeño to make it. His averages for that season were 20.6 points, 7.1 boards, 1.6 dimes, and 1.7 steals. He won the Breakout Player award during the 2018 Collegiate Basketball Awards.

In the offseason, Pasaol played in the PBA D-League. He also reaffirmed his commitment to UE despite Coach Pumaren resigning. He also played in the UAAP Season 80 3x3 basketball tournament, with his team finishing second. The Red Warriors then hired Joe Silva to be their head coach. Under Coach Silva, he transitioned to being more of a leader. He scored 36 points, grabbed 11 boards, added two assists and a block, but the Red Warriors still lost to the Adamson Falcons. They finally got their first win in a match against the FEU Tamaraws, in which he came off the bench for 25 points, 13 rebounds, and five steals. The following game, he had 32 points and 15 rebounds, but they lost again. He averaged 24.4 points, 11.0 rebounds, and 1.9 steals, enough to merit him another recognition in the UAAP 81 Mythical Five.

Initially, Pasaol planned on returning for Season 82, as he skipped the 2018 PBA Draft. On April 27, 2019, however, he announced that he wouldn't be returning.

== 3x3 career ==
=== Chooks-to-Go Pilipinas 3x3 (2019–20) ===
As an amateur, Pasaol played for the 1Bataan Risers, beginning in the inaugural leg of Chooks-to-Go Pilipinas 3x3. The Risers lost the President's Cup to the Pasig Grindhouse Kings. They also won silver during the Chooks-to-Go Asia Pacific Super Quest. For the Patriot's Cup, they lost 21–20 in the Finals to Phenom-Basilan Steel. Still, they qualified for the 2019 Xiongan Challenger. His side was able to win the Magiting Cup thanks to his game-winning shot over Pasig in the Finals. After he was named Tournament MVP for that cup, he announced that he had skipped the 2019 PBA Draft to focus on bringing the Philippines to the 2020 Tokyo Olympics via 3x3 basketball. They ended the season by winning the MelMac Cup.

The following season, Chooks-to-Go Pilipinas 3x3 became a professional league, making Pasaol a professional 3x3 player. He joined other national 3x3 players with the Zamboanga Family's Brand Sardines. The team won four of the five legs to win the President's Cup. Because of their title, they earned the right to play in the 2020 Fiba 3x3 World Tour Doha Masters. They lost their games in the Doha Masters, failing to qualify for the Jeddah Masters. He finished his 3x3 career as the 2nd-ranked 3x3 player in the country.

== Professional career ==
=== MPBL (2019–2020) ===
While playing 3x3 basketball for Bataan, he also played 5x5 for them in the Maharlika Pilipinas Basketball League (MPBL). He was then traded to the Zamboanga Family's Brand Sardines for Reed Juntilla. He had 21 points and six rebounds in a win over the Imus Bandera-Luxxe Slim, which was their fourth straight win. He then had 23 points on five triples in a win over Muntinlupa Angelis Resort. During All-Star Weekend, he led Team Pacquiao to the win during the Chooks-to-Go 3x3 Celebrity Game. He then contributed 19 points to the South All-Stars' overtime win over the North in the All-Star Game. In the playoffs, his team lost to the Davao Occidental Tigers in the Southern division semifinals.

=== PBA ===
Pasaol had previously skipped two straight drafts and faced a ban from the league. In 2021, he formalized his entry into the PBA season 46 draft. He was compared to Nelson Asaytono, Noli Locsin and Willie Miller leading up to the draft. He also did workouts with Barangay Ginebra, the Phoenix Fuel Masters, Rain or Shine Elasto Painters and Meralco.

==== Meralco Bolts (2021–2025) ====
Pasaol was drafted 9th overall by the Meralco Bolts. He signed a two-year rookie deal with the Bolts. After his commitment to the national 3x3 team, he was able to join the team. In the 2021 Philippine Cup, he scored 13 points in the fourth quarter and made all three of his triples to lead Meralco to a comeback win over the Alaska Aces. In a win against the NLEX Road Warriors, he had a PBA career-high 17 points. He then scored 15 points and seven rebounds in 16 minutes against Ginebra.

During the 2022 Philippine Cup playoffs, Pasaol made key contributions in their quarterfinal round series against Ginebra, who were Meralco's rivals. He scored 14 points in a Game 2 loss. In Game 3, he scored 11 points to help Meralco beat their rivals. He was also flagrantly fouled by Ginebra's Prince Caperal.

== Career statistics ==
=== PBA ===
Legend
GP	Games played	MPG	Minutes per game	FG%	Field-goal percentage
3FG%	3-point field-goal percentage	4P%	4-point field-goal percentage	FT%	Free-throw percentage
RPG	Rebounds per game	APG	Assists per game	SPG	Steals per game
BPG	Blocks per game	PPG	Points per game	127	Career high

As of the end of 2024–25 season

==== Season-by-season averages ====
Year	Team	GP	MPG	FG%	3P%	4P%	FT%	RPG	APG	SPG	BPG	PPG
2021	Meralco	25	9.7	.389	.346	—	.261	2.3	.6	.2	.1	3.9
2022–23	Meralco	37	7.8	.364	.340	—	.733	1.1	.3	.0	.1	2.5
2023–24	Meralco	19	7.3	.219	.050	—	.250	1.4	.3	.3	.2	.9
2024–25	Meralco	22	8.8	.462	.368	—	.316	2.0	.6	.0	.0	3.6
Career		103	8.4	.379	.313	—	.377	1.6	.4	.1	.1	2.8

=== MPBL ===
Year	Team	GP	MPG	FG%	3P%	FT%	RPG	APG	SPG	BPG	PPG
2019–20	Bataan	26	24	.390	.255	.618	5.0	2.0	0.8	0.7	15.0
2019–20	Zamboanga	26	24	.390	.255	.618	5.0	2.0	0.8	0.7	15.0
Career		26	24	.390	.255	.618	5.0	2.0	0.8	0.7	15.0

== National team career ==
Pasaol as a member of Balanga Chooks, represented the Philippines in the 2019 Fiba 3x3 World Tour Doha Masters. After winning their first game, he hit the game-winning two pointer over world no. 15 Moscow Inanomo to finish 2–0 in group play. They were defeated by Liman in the quarterfinals. Still, the Philippines rose in the 3x3 rankings after their performance. In the 2019 Tinkoff Moscow Challenger, they lost to Moscow. They also lost to Russia's Sosnovy Bor during that year's 3x3 Haining Challenger. He wasn't able to play for Balanga in the Bucharest Challenger due to his visa application being denied. In the Manila Masters, they were eliminated after losing both of their games. They were winless again in the Jeju Masters. After losing two games in the Jeddah Masters, they were out of the running for a spot in the 2019 3x3 World Tour Final. He, along with Joshua Munzon, was considered to be a top-two 3x3 player in the country.

In the Jakarta 3x3 International Invitational Challenge 2019, Pasaol, along with Munzon, Leonard Santillan and Troy Rike, swept the competition and won the tournament as preparation for the OQT.

Pasaol was also named to the FIBA 3x3 OQT lineup in 2020, along with Moala Tautuaa, Munzon, and CJ Perez. The tournament was moved to 2021 due to the COVID-19 pandemic. They had to train in a "bubble" in Calamba, Laguna to prepare for the OQT. He missed their one-week training camp due to quarantine protocols. Because he wasn't fit enough, he was replaced in the lineup by Santi Santillan. They finished in last place in that tournament.

== Personal life ==
Pasaol has a girlfriend, Gem Dy. Pasaol likes to eat rice before and after games.
