= 2020–21 Chooks-to-Go Pilipinas 3x3 season =

- League: Chooks-to-Go Pilipinas 3x3
- Sport: 3x3 basketball
- Teams: 12

President's Cup
- Champions: Zamboanga City
- Runners-up: Nueva Ecija

Patriot's Cup
- Champions: Not held

Magiting Cup
- Champions: Not held

Seasons
- ← 2019

The 2020–21 Chooks-to-Go Pilipinas 3x3 season is the second season of the Chooks-to-Go Pilipinas 3x3 basketball league. It is also its first season as a professional league.

Originally set to start in January 2020, the season was postponed due to the COVID-19 pandemic and was tentatively set to run from September and until in February 2021. Three conferences are planned with 12 teams participating in each tournament. However only one conference – the President's Cup in October 2020 was held.

== Venue ==
The Inspire Sports Academy in Calamba, Laguna serve as the sole venue of the league for the 2020-21 season. Players and staff will be confined in a bubble or isolation zone in Calamba for the duration of at least the President's Cup.

As early as August 2020, participating teams has been practicing at the University of the Philippines Epsilon Chi Gym in Quezon City.

== Teams ==
The following teams has confirmed their participation for this season.

- Bacolod Master Sardines
- Bicol Paxful SMDC
- Butuan City Uling Roasters
- Nueva Ecija Rice Vanguards
- Palayan City Capitals
- Pagadian City–Rocky Sports
- Pasig–Sta. Lucia Realtors
- Petra Cement–Roxas City ZN Rockies
- Big Boss Cement–Porac MSC Green Gorillas
- Sarangani Marlins
- Family's Brand Sardines-Zamboanga City
- Zamboanga Peninsula Valientes MLV

== Preseason tournament ==
A preseason tournament was held on October 19, 2020, at the Inspire Sports Academy. The preseason was won by Family's Brand Sardines-Zamboanga City which won 21–17 over Bacolod–Masters Sardines in the finals. The Nueva Ecija Rice Vanguards placed third.

== 2020 President's Cup ==
The 2020 President's Cup ran from October 21 to 30, 2020 and consisted of five legs. For the President's Cup, a financial incentive was given to teams that faced face Family's Brand Sardines-Zamboanga City Chooks, which consist of players of the Philippine national team, in the finals of each leg as preparation of the national team for the 2020 Summer Olympics qualifiers, although Zamboanga City had to have to earn a place in finals in all legs.

Zamboanga City won the 2020 President's Cup by winning four of five legs including the grand finals.

=== Leg winners ===
Leg		Date	Final			Winning players
Leg		Date	Champions	Score	Runner-up	Winning players
1	1st Tour	October 21	Zamboanga City	21–17	Butuan	Joshua Munzon; Alvin Pasaol; Troy Rike; Santi Santillan
2	2nd Tour	October 23	Zamboanga City	21–11	Nueva Ecija	Joshua Munzon; Alvin Pasaol; Troy Rike; Santi Santillan
3	3rd Tour	October 25	Butuan	21–20	Pasig	JR Alabanza; Chris de Chavez; Franky Johnson; Chico Lanete
4	4th Tour	October 27	Zamboanga City	21–20	Butuan	Joshua Munzon; Alvin Pasaol; Troy Rike; Santi Santillan
5	Grand Finals	October 30	Zamboanga City	22–19	Nueva Ecija	Joshua Munzon; Alvin Pasaol; Troy Rike; Santi Santillan
