= Mayor Vitaliano D. Agan Coliseum =

Indoor arena in Zamboanga City, Philippines

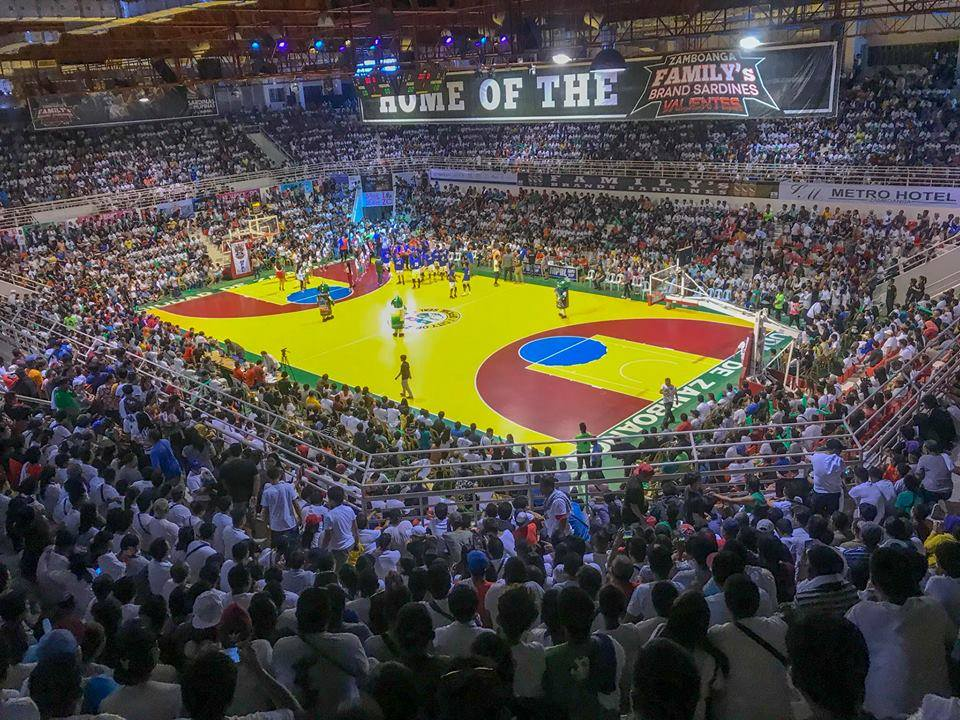
- The arena during a 2018 MPBL game.
- Former names: Zamboanga City Coliseum
- Location: Zamboanga City, Philippines
- Capacity: 10,000

Construction
- Opened: 2002; 24 years ago

Tenants
- Philippine Basketball Association (out-of-town games); Pilipinas VisMin Super Cup; The Asian Tournament; Zamboanga Valientes; Zamboanga Sikat (MPBL) (2018–present)

Mayor Vitaliano D. Agan Coliseum, also known by its former name, Zamboanga City Coliseum, is an indoor arena located in Zamboanga City, Philippines. The arena, which opened in 2002, is currently home to the Zamboanga Valientes, who have competed in multiple leagues, and the Zamboanga Sikat of the Maharlika Pilipinas Basketball League (MPBL). It has also hosted games of the Philippine Basketball Association (PBA), Pilipinas VisMin Super Cup, and The Asian Tournament (TAT).

The arena is given its current name in 2009 under Ordinance No. 352, following the passing of Vitaliano Agan, who was the mayor of Zamboanga City from 1987 to 1998.

== Notable events ==
In the Maharlika Pilipinas Basketball League, it serves as the home venue of the Zamboanga Sikat. Their first home game happened on October 27, 2018, when the team, then under the Zamboanga Valientes banner, faced against the Manila Stars. The venue also hosted games 3 and 4 of the 2022 MPBL finals, when Zamboanga faced the Nueva Ecija Rice Vanguards. In the latter game, Zamboanga would lose the series to Nueva Ecija on home soil. On September 7, 2024, it hosted the 2024 MPBL All-Star Game, the first time the event took place outside of Luzon.

The Philippine Basketball Association has used the Mayor Vitaliano D. Agan Coliseum as one of its out-of-town venues. The league's most recent game at the venue was a 2025 Philippine Cup game between the Magnolia Chicken Timplados Hotshots and Phoenix Fuel Masters.

In other leagues, the Pilipinas VisMin Super Cup has used the venue beginning with the 2022 Import-laden Conference. The Asian Tournament held its final leg at the venue, which saw the hometown Zamboanga Valientes win the overall championship.

Events and tenants
Preceded by first venue	Home of the Zamboanga Sikat; 2019–present	Succeeded by current
Preceded by Bataan People's Center	Host of the MPBL All-Star Game; 2024	Succeeded by Alonte Sports Arena
