= Zamboanga Sikat =

Professional basketball team in Zamboanga Peninsula in the Philippines

- 2026 Zamboanga Sikat season
- League: MPBL (2019–present); FilBasket (2022)
- Founded: 2019; 7 years ago
- History: Zamboanga Valientes; 2018; Zamboanga Family's Brand Sardines; 2019–2023; Zamboanga Master Sardines; 2024; Zamboanga Sikat; 2025–present
- Arena: Mayor Vitaliano D. Agan Coliseum
- Location: Zamboanga City
- Team colors
- Main sponsor: Universal Canning Inc. Sikat Sports
- Head coach: JR Carlos
- Conference titles: MPBL: 1 (2022)

The Zamboanga Sikat Family's Brand Sardines (stylized as Zamboanga SiKAT), alternatively known as Sikat Zamboanga, is a Filipino professional basketball team based in Zamboanga City. The team currently competes in the Maharlika Pilipinas Basketball League (MPBL) as a member of the league's South Division. The team plays its home games at Mayor Vitaliano D. Agan Coliseum.

The team was established in 2019 after splitting from the Zamboanga Valientes due to undisclosed management issues. The new team was then named the Zamboanga Family's Brand Sardines, and later renamed to Zamboanga Master Sardines in 2024. Universal Canning Inc. served as the team's title sponsor from 2019 to 2024.

The Zamboanga franchise is one of five teams based in Mindanao and the only one from the Zamboanga Peninsula region. They have also played in Filbasket and in the Chooks-to-Go Pilipinas 3x3.

== History ==
=== Maharlika Pilipinas Basketball League ===
==== 2018–2020: The Arboleda era ====
Led by Harold Arboleda and Reed Juntilla, the Zamboanga franchise would finish the 2018–19 season as the sixth seed in the South Division. The team would upset the third-seeded Muntinlupa Cagers in three games in the division quarterfinals. Despite winning game 1 of the division semifinals, Zamboanga would lose to the defending champion Batangas City Athletics in the next two games. In the succeeding 2019–20 season, with the addition of Alvin Pasaol, Zamboanga improved from their 12–13 record to move up 18–12. In the playoffs, as the fifth seed, Zamboanga would get their revenge on Batangas City by beating them in three games in the division quarterfinals. In the division semifinals, however, they would lose to the eventual champion Davao Occidental Tigers.

Zamboanga initially announced that it would not participate in the succeeding season and decided their status in the MPBL on 2022.

==== 2022–2024: The Twin Turbo era and first division championship ====
The team opted out of the 2021 Invitational, but did eventually compete in the 2022 season, changing the team's prior decision. That season saw the arrival of the Marcelino twins, Jaycee and Jayvee. The "Twin Turbo" would help lead Zamboanga to their best regular season record to date, as the top seed in the South with an 18–3 record. Zamboanga then booked its first MPBL finals appearance after beating the Batangas City Embassy Chill in the South Division finals. In the 2022 MPBL finals, Zamboanga lost to the Nueva Ecija Rice Vanguards in four games. They would lose to the Nueva Ecija Rice Vanguards in four games in the national finals series.

Zamboanga then took part in the 2023 Preseason Invitational, which they would end up winning after their finals victory against Nueva Ecija. They would then record their winningest season to date, 20–8, although they would fall down to the fourth seed. After beating the expansion Quezon Huskers in three games, they division title defense came to an end after getting swept by the Bacoor City Strikers. For the 2024 season, the team changed their team name to Zamboanga Master Sardines. Despite matching their previous record from last season and making the playoffs for a fifth consecutive season, the team suffered its first division quarterfinals exit after losing to the Parañaque Patriots in three games. After this season, the Marcelino twins would leave Zamboanga for Nueva Ecija.

=== Chooks-to-Go Pilipinas 3x3 ===
Family's Brand Sardines joined the Chooks-to-Go Pilipinas 3x3, debuting in the 2020-21 season. For the President's Cup, they fielded a roster filled with national 3x3 players; Joshua Munzon, Alvin Pasaol, Troy Rike, Santi Santillan. The decision was made as part of the preparation of the Philippine national team for their participation in the Olympic Qualifying Tournament (OQT) for the 2020 Summer Olympics. The team won the President's Cup title, winning four of five legs including the grand final, which granted the team of a spot at the Doha Masters of the 2020 FIBA 3x3 World Tour.

== Team identity ==
The team's former logos from 2019 to 2024 under the title sponsorship of Universal Canning, Inc.

=== 2019–2024 ===
When the franchise split from the Valientes, the logo carried over to the new ZFAMS team, which shared elements with the Valientes' logo. The former moniker had a double meaning, not only referring to the products of Universal Canning Inc., which owns both the Family's Brand Sardines and Master Sardines brands, but also as a reference to Zamboanga City being referred to as the "Sardines Capital of the Philippines".

In 2024, alongside the announcement of the name change to Master Sardines, a logo-making contest was also announced to create the new identity. The new logo was later shown on February 22, 2024. Created by Ritche Faustorilla Ocampo, it featured a sardine holding a basketball with a gold outline.

=== 2025–present ===
In 2025, the team had its biggest change in branding, as the team gained the backing of Sikat Sports, a group led by Kat Chua.

== Home venues ==
The Zamboanga franchise has played all of its home games at Mayor Vitaliano D. Agan Coliseum. With a capacity of 12,000, it is tied with Cuneta Astrodome for the highest-capacity venue in the MPBL. It hosted the MPBL All-Star Game in 2024.

Venue	Location	Capacity	2018–19	2019–20	2022	2023	2024	2025
Mayor Vitaliano D. Agan Coliseum	Zamboanga City	12,000	✓	✓	✓	✓	✓	✓

== Rivalries ==
=== Batangas City Tanduay Rum Masters ===
Zamboanga and Batangas City have faced each other in the playoffs in three consecutive occasions from 2019 to 2022, all of which went the full three games. Zamboanga won the series in both 2020 and in 2022. As of 2023, the two teams have met a total of thirteen times in the MPBL.

== Current roster ==
Zamboanga Sikat roster
Players

Pos.	No.	Name	Height	Weight	DOB	From
G	0	Michael Are	5 ft 9 in (1.75 m)			San Sebastian
F/C	1	Dave Bernabe	6 ft 5 in (1.96 m)		2000-03-20	Centro Escolar
G	4	Rafael Are	5 ft 9 in (1.75 m)			San Sebastian
F	5	Sherwin Concepcion	6 ft 3 in (1.91 m)		1997–01–23	UST
G	6	Robin Roño	5 ft 11 in (1.80 m)		1997–04–27	National-U
F	8	Jan Carl Luciano (HG)	6 ft 2 in (1.88 m)			Emilio Aguinaldo
C	10	Joseph Gabayni	6 ft 5 in (1.96 m)		1994–09–28	Lyceum
G	11	Forthsky Padrigao (HG)	6 ft 0 in (1.83 m)		2002-03-11	UST
G	12	Levi Hernandez	6 ft 1 in (1.85 m)	190 lb (86 kg)	1990–03–09	Arellano
C	13	Paul Turco	6 ft 6 in (1.98 m)			St. Benilde
G	15	Reggz Gabat	6 ft 0 in (1.83 m)			San Sebastian
F	16	Joshua Lazaro	6 ft 5 in (1.96 m)		2002-06-11	Ateneo
F	17	Mohammad Salim (HG)	6 ft 4 in (1.93 m)			National-U
F	18	Inand Fornilos	6 ft 2 in (1.88 m)	195 lb (88 kg)	1999–02–03	Ateneo
F	19	John Edcel Rojas	6 ft 4 in (1.93 m)			St. Clare of Caloocan
G	20	Omar Chua (HG)	5 ft 7 in (1.70 m)
G/F	22	Jhon Arthur Calisay	6 ft 2 in (1.88 m)			Adamson
G/F	23	Brandon Ray Wilson (FF)	6 ft 6 in (1.98 m)	220 lb (100 kg)		Oklahoma City
F	24	Jayson Puray	6 ft 2 in (1.88 m)			Centro Escolar
F/C	51	Christian Buñag	6 ft 7 in (2.01 m)			Mapúa
G	88	Paul Garcia	5 ft 11 in (1.80 m)	170 lb (77 kg)	1999–06–04	Ateneo
G	99	John Mahari (HG)	6 ft 2 in (1.88 m)

Coaches

Head coach

- JR Carlos

Assistant coach(es)

- Drake Santos
- Raymond Tiongco
- Joe Ferabia

Team manager

- Martin Go
- Rham Iraham

Legend

- (HG) Homegrown
- (FF) Filipino-foreigner
- (EA) EASL player
- (RS) Reserve player
- (S) Suspended
- Injured

- Roster – via Genius Sports
Updated as of: June 22, 2026

=== Head coaches ===
Zamboanga Sikat head coaches
#	Name	Start	End	Achievements	Ref.
1	Ednie Morones	2018	2019	—	
2	Raymund Valenzona	2019	2020	—	
3	Bai Cristobal	2020	2020	—	
4	Britt Reroma	2020	2021	—	
5	Vic Ycasiano	2022	2023	Division champion (2022)	
6	Louie Alas	2023	2024	—	
7	Bong Ramos	2025	2025	—	
8	John Sia	2026	2026	—	
9	JR Carlos	2026	current	—	

== Notable players ==
=== Individual award winners ===
MPBL Most Valuable Player

- Jaycee Marcelino – 2022

All-MPBL First Team

- Jaycee Marcelino – 2022, 2023

All-MPBL Second Team

- Harold Arboleda – 2019

=== MPBL All-Star Day ===
All-Star selections

- Reed Juntilla – 2019
- Alvin Pasaol – 2020
- Jaycee Marcelino – 2022–2024
- Joseph Gabayni – 2023
- Choi Ignacio – 2024

=== PBA players ===
Ex-PBA players

- Harold Arboleda
- Reden Celda (returned to PBA)
- Carl Bryan Cruz
- Bong Galanza
- Chito Jaime
- Reed Juntilla
- Jaycee Marcelino
- Rey Publico
- Raphy Reyes
- Renzo Subido
- Hans Thiele
- Eric Rodriguez
- Roi Sumang

Drafted to PBA

- Aaron Black – 18th overall, 2019
- Leonard Santillan – 5th overall, season 46
- Alvin Pasaol – 9th overall, season 46
- Anton Asistio – 22nd overall, season 46

== Season-by-season records ==
League champions
Division champions
Qualified for playoffs
Best regular season record

=== Maharlika Pilipinas Basketball League ===
Season	Regular season							Playoffs	
Season	Division	Finish	GP	W	L	PCT	GB	Stage	Results
Zamboanga Family's Brand Sardines
2018–19; Datu Cup	South	6th	25	12	13	.480	8	Division quarterfinals Division semifinals	won vs. Muntinlupa, 2–1 lost vs. Batangas City, 1–2
2019–20; Lakan Season	South	5th	30	18	12	.600	8	Division quarterfinals Division semifinals	won vs. Batangas City, 2–1 lost vs. Davao Occidental, 0–2
2022	South	1st	21	18	3	.857	—	Division quarterfinals Division semifinals Division finals National finals	won vs. Muntinlupa, 2–0 won vs. Bacolod, 2–1 won vs. Batangas City, 2–1 lost vs. Nueva Ecija, 1–3
2023	South	4th	28	20	8	.714	3	Division quarterfinals Division semifinals	won vs. Quezon, 2–1 lost vs. Bacoor City, 0–2
Zamboanga Master Sardines
2024	South	4th	28	20	8	.714	1	Division quarterfinals	lost vs. Parañaque, 1–2
Zamboanga Sikat
2025	South	7th	29	17	12	.586	8	Division quarterfinals	lost vs. Batangas City, 1–2
2026	South	9th	25	11	14	.440	10	Division quarterfinals	lost vs. Quezon, 1–2
All-time regular season record			186	116	70	.624		7 playoff appearances	
All-time playoff record			37	17	20	.459		1 finals appearance	
All-time overall record			223	133	90	.596		0 championships	
