= 2021 PBA draft =

The 2021 PBA draft can refer to either:

- PBA season 46 draft – held on March 14, 2021, prior to the delayed start of the 2021 PBA season, exercising 2020 draft picks
- PBA season 47 draft – held on May 15, 2022, prior to the regularly scheduled start of the 2022 PBA season, exercising 2021 draft picks
