= SBP Pambansang Tatluhan =

Tournament information
- Sport: 3x3 basketball
- Location: Philippines
- Established: 2016
- Teams: B: 16; G: 16 (National Finals)

The SBP Pambansang Tatluhan (lit. 'SBP National Three-on-three') is a 3x3 basketball tournament catered for basketball players aged 16 below launched in 2016. The grassroots tournament is organized by the Samahang Basketbol ng Pilipinas (SBP), the national sports association for basketball. The tournament started with the regional qualifiers, where 584 teams across the country participated.

In the Visayas regional finals held in Cebu, the University of the Visayas and Abellana National School claimed the girls and boys division titles, respectively. 32 teams, 16 from the boys division and 16 from the girls division competed in the national finals held at the SM Mall of Asia Music Hall on June 9, 2016.

Philippines men's national basketball team member Andray Blatche led the opening ceremony.

== See also ==
- Chooks-to-Go Pilipinas 3x3
- Basketball in the Philippines
