= PBA season 46 draft =

Player selection in Philippine basketball

General information
- Date: March 14, 2021
- Location: TV5 Media Center, Mandaluyong (draft held via conference call)
- Network: One Sports (TV5, PBA Rush)

Overview
- League: Philippine Basketball Association
- First selection: Joshua Munzon, (Note: The season 46 draft was composed of two drafts: the Gilas special draft, which consisted of 4 players reserved for the Philippine national team, and the regular draft. Jordan Heading was selected as the first pick in the Gilas special draft. Munzon was selected by Terrafirma Dyip as the first pick of the regular draft.) Terrafirma Dyip

The PBA season 46 draft (originally planned as the 2020 PBA rookie draft) was the 36th edition of the PBA draft. The league determined the drafting order based on the performance of the member teams from the 2020 season, with the team having the worst record picking first. For this draft, the PBA decided to forgo the seven-game requirement to play in the PBA Developmental League (D-League).

The Terrafirma Dyip held the right for the first overall pick of the draft.

== Draft order ==
Since 2015, the draft order was determined based on the overall performance of the teams from the previous season. The Philippine Cup final ranking comprises 40% of the points, while the rankings of the Commissioner's and Governors' Cups are 30% each.

Since the league held only one tournament for the 2020 season, the final rankings of the Philippine Cup were used to determine the draft order.

Draft order	Team	Philippine Cup ranking
1st	Terrafirma Dyip	12th
2nd	NorthPort Batang Pier	11th
3rd	Blackwater Elite	10th
4th	NLEX Road Warriors	9th
5th	Rain or Shine Elasto Painters	8th
6th	Magnolia Pambansang Manok Hotshots	7th
7th	Alaska Aces	6th
8th	San Miguel Beermen	5th
9th	Meralco Bolts	4th
10th	Phoenix Super LPG Fuel Masters	3rd
11th	TNT Tropang Giga	2nd
12th	Barangay Ginebra San Miguel	1st

=== Special draft ===
For the third time and second consecutively in PBA history, there was another separate draft for the players in the pool for the Philippine national team, locally known as Gilas Pilipinas. Four teams held the rights to the players they selected only after their release from international duty.

As a reiteration of the agreement between the PBA and the Samahang Basketbol ng Pilipinas, the latter named players to be loaned to the Philippines training camp after their selection in this special draft.

== Draft selections ==
PG	Point guard	SG	Shooting guard	SF	Small forward	PF	Power forward	C	Center	*	Mythical team member	^{#}	All-Star

=== Special round ===
Pick	Player	Pos.	Country of birth	Team	School / club team
1	Jordan Heading	SG	Australia	Terrafirma Dyip	California Baptist
2	William Navarro	PF	Greece	NorthPort Batang Pier	Ateneo
3	Tzaddy Rangel	C	Philippines	NLEX Road Warriors	NU
4	Jaydee Tungcab	SG/SF	Philippines	TNT Tropang Giga	UP Diliman

=== 1st round ===
Pick	Player	Pos.	Country of birth	Team	School / club team
1	Joshua Munzon	SG/SF	United States	Terrafirma Dyip	Cal State Los Angeles
2	Jamie Malonzo^{#}	SF/PF	United States	NorthPort Batang Pier	De La Salle
3	Calvin Oftana^{#}	SF	Philippines	NLEX Road Warriors (from Blackwater) (Note: February 28, 2020: Blackwater to NLEX (three-team trade with TNT): NLEX acquired Anthony Semerad, Rabeh Al-Hussaini, a 2020 first round pick, and a 2021 second round pick from Blackwater; Blackwater acquired Marion Magat, Yousef Taha, Ed Daquioag, 2021 and 2022 first round picks from TNT; TNT acquired John Paul Erram from NLEX via Blackwater)	San Beda
4	Mikey Williams*	SG/PG	United States	TNT Tropang Giga (from NLEX via Blackwater) (Note: March 11, 2021: Blackwater to NLEX (three-team trade with TNT): NLEX acquired Don Trollano, Roi Sumang, Maurice Shaw, and a 2022 second round pick from Blackwater; Blackwater acquired David Semerad, Simon Enciso, Ed Daquioag, 2023 first round and 2024 second round picks from TNT; TNT acquired a 2020 first round pick from Blackwater, which earlier acquired it from NLEX)	Cal State Fullerton/ GenSan Warriors (MPBL)
5	Leonard Santillan^{#}	PF/C	Philippines	Rain or Shine Elasto Painters	De La Salle
6	Ben Adamos	C	Philippines	Alaska Aces (from Magnolia via Phoenix) (Note: February 17, 2021: Magnolia to Phoenix: Phoenix acquired Chris Banchero, 2020 first and second round picks; Magnolia acquired Calvin Abueva and a 2020 first round pick) (Note: February 23, 2021: Phoenix to Alaska: Alaska acquired Brian Heruela, 2020 first and second round picks, and a 2021 first round pick; Phoenix acquired Vic Manuel, 2020 first and second round picks)	Perpetual
7	Larry Muyang	C	Philippines	Phoenix Super LPG Fuel Masters (from Alaska)	Letran
8	James Laput	C	Australia	Terrafirma Dyip (from San Miguel) (Note: February 2, 2021: San Miguel to Terrafirma: Terrafirma acquired Russel Escoto, Gelo Alolino, Matt Ganuelas-Rosser, 2020 and 2022 first round picks; San Miguel acquired CJ Perez)	De La Salle
9	Alvin Pasaol	SF	Philippines	Meralco Bolts	UE
10	Jerrick Ahanmisi	SG	United States	Magnolia Pambansang Manok Hotshots (from Phoenix)	Adamson
11	Troy Rike	C/PF	United States	NorthPort Batang Pier (from TNT) (Note: April 3, 2018: TNT to NorthPort (GlobalPort): GlobalPort acquired Mo Tautuaa, a 2020 first round pick, and a 2021 second round pick; TNT acquired Terrence Romeo and Yousef Taha)	NU
12	Ken Holmqvist	C	Philippines	Barangay Ginebra San Miguel	FEU

=== 2nd round ===
Pick	Player	Pos.	Country of birth	Team	School / club team
13	Brian Enriquez	SF/SG	United States	Barangay Ginebra San Miguel (from Terrafirma via NLEX and NorthPort) (Note: May 5, 2017: Terrafirma (Mahindra) to NLEX: NLEX acquired Alex Mallari, Kenneth Ighalo, and a 2020 second round pick; Mahindra acquired Glenn Khobuntin and Eric Camson) (Note: June 10, 2019: NLEX to NorthPort (three-team trade with TNT): NorthPort acquired Terrafirma's (Columbian's) 2020 second round pick and Phoenix Super LPG's (Phoenix Pulse's) 2019 second round pick which was not conveyed, from NLEX; Michael Miranda from TNT; NLEX acquired Jericho Cruz from TNT and San Miguel's 2020 second round pick from NorthPort; TNT acquired Marion Magat from NLEX; 2021 and 2022 second round picks from NorthPort) (Note: March 12, 2021: Barangay Ginebra to NorthPort: Ginebra acquired Terrafirma's 2020 second round pick; NorthPort acquired Jerrick Balanza and Barangay Ginebra's 2020 second round pick)	William Woods
14	Rey Mark Acuno	C	Philippines	Blackwater Bossing (from NorthPort via Meralco) (Note: January 15, 2019: NorthPort to Meralco: Meralco acquired a 2020 second round pick; NorthPort acquired Garvo Lanete; October 25, 2019: Meralco to Blackwater: Blackwater acquired Niño Canaleta, Mike Tolomia, 2020 and 2022 second round picks; Meralco acquired Allein Maliksi and Raymar Jose)	UE/Manila Stars (MPBL)
15	Joshua Torralba	SG/SF	United States	Blackwater Bossing	De La Salle/Makati Super Crunch (MPBL)
16	Taylor Browne	SG/SF	Canada	Alaska Aces (from NLEX via Phoenix) (Note: August 15, 2017: NLEX to Phoenix Super LPG (Phoenix) (three-team trade with NorthPort [GlobalPort]): Phoenix acquired Dylan Ababou from GlobalPort and a 2020 second round pick from NLEX; GlobalPort acquired Mac Baracael from NLEX; NLEX acquired Cyrus Baguio from Phoenix) (Note: February 23, 2021: Phoenix to Alaska: See Phoenix to Alaska (note D))	UBC
17	Franky Johnson	SG	United States	Rain or Shine Elasto Painters	Warner Pacific
18	Nick Demusis	SF/PF	Philippines	Phoenix Super LPG Fuel Masters (from Magnolia)	Whittier/Bacoor City Strikers (MPBL)
19	Aljun Melecio	PG	Philippines	Phoenix Super LPG Fuel Masters (from Alaska)	De La Salle
20	David Murrell	SF	United States	NLEX Road Warriors (from San Miguel via NorthPort) (Note: June 21, 2018: San Miguel to NorthPort (GlobalPort): GlobalPort acquired Gabby Espinas and a 2020 second round pick; San Miguel acquired Kelly Nabong) (Note: June 10, 2019: NorthPort to NLEX: See NLEX to NorthPort)	UP Diliman
21	Alec Stockton	SG/PG	United States	Alaska Aces (from Meralco via Phoenix) (Note: January 12, 2019: Meralco to Phoenix Super LPG (Phoenix Pulse): Phoenix Pulse acquired Jason Ballesteros and a 2020 second round pick; Meralco acquired John Pinto; December 10, 2019: Phoenix Super LPG (Phoenix Pulse) to Alaska: Alaska acquired a 2020 second round pick; Phoenix Pulse acquired Jake Pascual)	FEU
22	Anton Asistio	PG	Philippines	Rain or Shine Elasto Painters (from Phoenix) (Note: August 7, 2017: Phoenix Super LPG (Phoenix) to Rain or Shine: Rain or Shine acquired Mark Borboran and a 2020 second round pick; Phoenix acquired Jeff Chan)	Ateneo
23	Andrei Caracut	PG	Philippines	Rain or Shine Elasto Painters (from TNT) (Note: January 14, 2020: TNT to Rain or Shine: Rain or Shine acquired a 2020 second round pick, NorthPort's 2021 second round pick, and San Miguel's 2022 second round pick; TNT acquired Ed Daquioag)	De La Salle/San Miguel Alab Pilipinas (ASEAN)
24	Mark Olayon	SF	Philippines	NorthPort Batang Pier (from Barangay Ginebra)	UE

=== 3rd round ===
Pick	Player	Pos.	Country of birth	Team	School / club team
25	Dhon Reverente	SF/PF	Philippines	Terrafirma Dyip	PMI
26	Loren Brill	PG	United States	NorthPort Batang Pier	Old Dominion
27	Andre Paras	C/PF	United States	Blackwater Bossing	UP Diliman
28	Antonio Bonsubre	PF	Philippines	NLEX Road Warriors	San Beda
29	Kenneth Mocon	SG	Philippines	Rain or Shine Elasto Painters	San Beda
30	Ronnie de Leon	SF	Philippines	Magnolia Pambansang Manok Hotshots	UE
31	RK Ilagan	PG	Philippines	Alaska Aces	San Sebastian
32	Allen Enriquez	PF	Philippines	San Miguel Beermen	Arellano
33	John Yasa	C/PF	Philippines	Meralco Bolts	PCU
34	Reymar Caduyac	PG/SG	Philippines	Phoenix Super LPG Fuel Masters	Lyceum
35	Michael Simmonds	SG/SF	United States	TNT Tropang Giga	Baruch

- Barangay Ginebra passed during the round.

=== 4th round ===
Pick	Player	Pos.	Country of birth	Team	School / club team
36	Michael Javelosa	SF/PF	Philippines	Terrafirma Dyip	Ateneo
37	Marvin Moraga	SG	Philippines	NorthPort Batang Pier	St. Xavier
38	Jun Manzo	PG	Philippines	Blackwater Bossing	UP Diliman
39	Jose Presbitero	PG	Philippines	NLEX Road Warriors	San Beda
40	RJ Argamino	PG	Philippines	Rain or Shine Elasto Painters	Benilde
41	Andrew Estrella	SG/PG	Philippines	Magnolia Pambansang Manok Hotshots	Mapúa/ San Juan Knights (MPBL)
42	Mohammad Salim	PF	Philippines	San Miguel Beermen	NU
43	Luis Brill	PG	United States	Meralco Bolts	Wheeling
44	Max Hentschel	SF	Philippines	Phoenix Super LPG Fuel Masters	UvA
45	Joel Lee Yu	SG/PG	Philippines	TNT Tropang Giga	FEU

- Alaska passed during the round.

=== 5th round ===
Pick	Player	Pos.	Country of birth	Team	School / club team
46	Immanuel Custodio	SF	Philippines	Terrafirma Dyip	Ateneo de Naga
47	Carl Bryan Ravanes	SG	Philippines	NorthPort Batang Pier	Southville Foreign
48	Kim Bayquin	SG/SF	Philippines	Blackwater Bossing	FEU
49	Joseph Alcantara	SG	Philippines	NLEX Road Warriors	La Consolacion
50	Philip Manalang	PG	Philippines	Rain or Shine Elasto Painters	UE
51	Greg Flor	SF	Philippines	San Miguel Beermen	PMMA
52	Jerie Pingoy	PG	Philippines	Phoenix Super LPG Fuel Masters	Adamson
53	Martin Gozum	SF	Philippines	TNT Tropang Giga	OLFU

- Magnolia and Meralco passed during the round.

=== 6th round ===
Pick	Player	Pos.	Country of birth	Team	School / club team
54	Terrence Tumalip	SG	Philippines	Terrafirma Dyip	TIP
55	Seraj Elmejrab	C	Libya	NorthPort Batang Pier	Lyceum
56	Jeson Delfinado	SG	Philippines	Blackwater Bossing	FEU
57	Alberto Torres	SG	Philippines	NLEX Road Warriors	Canottieri Milano (Italy)
58	Jeffrey Manday	SG	Philippines	San Miguel Beermen	Santa Ana de Victorias

- Rain or Shine, Phoenix, and TNT passed during the round.

=== 7th round ===
Pick	Player	Pos.	Country of birth	Team	School / club team
59	Jonico Rosales	PG	Philippines	NorthPort Batang Pier	AMA
60	Luis Abaca	PG	Philippines	San Miguel Beermen	Benilde

- Terrafirma, Blackwater, and NLEX passed during the round.

=== 8th round ===
Pick	Player	Pos.	Country of birth	Team	School / club team
61	Jed Mendoza	SG	Philippines	NorthPort Batang Pier	UE

- San Miguel passed during the round.

=== 9th round ===
A ninth round was held, but NorthPort passed, thus ending the draft.

== Trades involving draft picks ==
NOTE: Due to the draft's postponement, all draft picks from 2020 onwards are executed one year later.

=== Pre-draft trades ===
Prior to the day of the draft, the following trades were made and resulted in exchanges of picks between the teams.

== Draft picks per school ==
School	Rounds			Total
School	Special	1st	After 1st	Total
De La Salle	0	3	3	6
FEU	0	1	4	5
San Beda	0	1	3	4
UE	0	1	3	4
UP Diliman	1	0	3	4
Ateneo	1	0	2	3
NU	1	0	1	2
Lyceum	0	0	2	2
Benilde	0	0	2	2
Other schools				1 each
