= 2024 MPBL All-Star Game =

5th edition of the MPBL All-Star Game

North All-Stars	South All-Stars
95	91
Head coach: Dennis Pineda (Pampanga Giant Lanterns)	Head coach: Eric Gonzales (Quezon Huskers)
	1	2	3	4	Total
North All-Stars	28	21	28	18	95
South All-Stars	26	21	23	21	91
- Date: September 7, 2024
- Venue: Mayor Vitaliano D. Agan Coliseum, Zamboanga City
- MVP: Will McAloney
- Network: MPTV

The 2024 MPBL All-Star Game was an exhibition game played on September 7, 2024, during the 2024 season of the Maharlika Pilipinas Basketball League (MPBL). It was the fifth edition of the MPBL All-Star Game, which took place at the Mayor Vitaliano D. Agan Coliseum in Zamboanga City, the home arena of the Zamboanga Master Sardines. (Note: Despite playing home games there on previous occasions, the team didn't play any home games up to this point in the season.)

The North Division won against the South Division for the second consecutive year with a score of 95–91. Will McAloney of the Nueva Ecija Rice Vanguards was declared the All-Star Game MVP.

== All-Star Game ==
=== Coaches ===
The two coaches of each division's highest-ranked team up to that point coached the all-star rosters of their respective divisions. The coaches were unveiled at the All-Star Game itself. The South Division all-stars were coached by Eric Gonzales of the Quezon Huskers. Although the San Juan Knights led the North Division at the time of the event, its all-stars were instead coached by Dennis Pineda of the second-place Pampanga Giant Lanterns.

=== Lineups ===
The starters were announced on August 17, 2024. In the North Division, Will McAloney earned his third all-star selection overall and his third as a starter. Reiging MVP and Finals MVP Justine Baltazar alongside Orlan Wamar Jr. earned their second selection as both all-star and starter. Seeing their all-star debuts were Greg Slaughter of the Manila Batang Sampaloc and Laurenz Victoria of the Pasay Voyagers.

In the South Division, Cedric Ablaza of the Batangas City Tanduay Rum Masters was selected for a record fourth all-star selection. Ablaza also became a three-time all-star starter together with former MVP Jaycee Marcelino of the hosting Zamboanga Master Sardines, who made his third appearance. Ljay Gonzales and Ximone Sandagon of the Quezon Huskers made their all-star debuts alongside Christian Fajarito of the South Cotabato Warriors.

The reserves were announced two days later on August 19. In the North Division, Robby Celiz of Nueva Ecija was selected as an all-star for the third time. Multiple players earned their second selection, including Jason Ballesteros of the Quezon City Toda Aksyon, Archie Concepcion of Pampanga, Michael Juico of the Pangasinan Heatwaves, Paul Sanga of the Caloocan Batang Kankaloo, and Roi Sumang of the Abra Weavers. Meanwhile, Rabeh Al-Hussaini of Manila, Warren Bonifacio of Pasay, Hesed Gabo of Pangasinan, and Rhinwill Yambing of Quezon City became first-time all-stars.

In the South Division, two players, Levi Hernandez of Batangas City and Larry Rodriguez of South Cotabato, became two-time all stars. Among the players who were given their first all-star selection were Choi Ignacio of Zamboanga and Ryan Sual of the Sarangani Marlins. They were joined by multiple team pairs: Arthur dela Cruz and Mac Tallo of Davao Occidental, Marc Pingris and Kenny Rocacurva of the Biñan Tatak Gel, and Jielo Razon and JP Sarao of the Parañaque Patriots.

The replacements for the South Division were announced on September 3. Renz Palma of the Negros Muscovados replaced Marcelino, who opted out of the event due to personal reasons. Fajarito was unable to play for health reasons and was replaced by Louie Vigil of the Bacolod City of Smiles. Both Palma and Vigil made their all-star debuts. Four days later, on the day of the All-Star Game itself, it was announced that Pingris and Razon would be promoted to the starting lineup in place of Fajarito and Marcelino, respectively.

Also announced on September 3 were the homegrown picks, a new addition to the MPBL All-Star Game. Each division featured one homegrown pick as an additional player in their roster. Carl Bryan Lacap of the Valenzuela Classic and JJ Caspe of the Mindoro Tamaraws were chosen as the two homegrown selections, with both players also making their all-star debuts.

North All-Stars
Pos.	Player	Team	No. of selections
Starters
	Justine Baltazar	Pampanga Giant Lanterns	2
	Will McAloney	Nueva Ecija Rice Vanguards	3
	Greg Slaughter	Manila Batang Sampaloc	1
	Laurenz Victoria	Pasay Voyagers	1
	Orlan Wamar Jr.	San Juan Knights	2
Reserves
	Rabeh Al-Hussaini	Manila Batang Sampaloc	1
	Jason Ballesteros	Quezon City Toda Aksyon	2
	Warren Bonifacio	Pasay Voyagers	1
	Robby Celiz	Nueva Ecija Rice Vanguards	3
	Archie Concepcion	Pampanga Giant Lanterns	2
	Hesed Gabo	Pangasinan Heatwaves	1
	Michael Juico	Pangasinan Heatwaves	2
	Paul Sanga	Caloocan Batang Kankaloo	2
	Roi Sumang	Abra Weavers	2
	Rhinwill Yambing	Quezon City Toda Aksyon	1
Homegrown pick
	Carl Byran Lacap	Valenzuela Classic	1
Head coach: Dennis Pineda (Pampanga Giant Lanterns)

South All-Stars
Pos.	Player	Team	No. of selections
Starters
	Cedric Ablaza	Batangas City Tanduay Rum Masters	4
	Christian Fajarito^{DNP1}	South Cotabato Warriors	1
	Ljay Gonzales	Quezon Huskers	1
	Jaycee Marcelino^{DNP2}	Zamboanga Master Sardines	3
	Ximone Sandagon	Quezon Huskers	1
Reserves
	Arthur dela Cruz	Davao Occidental Tigers	1
	Levi Hernandez	Batangas City Tanduay Rum Masters	2
	Choi Ignacio	Zamboanga Master Sardines	1
	Renz Palma^{REP2}	Negros Muscovados	1
	Marc Pingris^{ST1}	Biñan Tatak Gel	1
	Jielo Razon^{ST2}	Parañaque Patriots	1
	Kenny Rocacurva	Biñan Tatak Gel	1
	Larry Rodriguez	South Cotabato Warriors	2
	JP Sarao	Parañaque Patriots	1
	Ryan Sual	Sarangani Marlins	1
	Mac Tallo	Davao Occidental Tigers	1
	Louie Vigil^{REP1}	Bacolod City of Smiles	1
Homegrown pick
	JJ Caspe	Mindoro Tamaraws	1
Head coach: Eric Gonzales (Quezon Huskers)

^DNP1 Christian Fajarito will be unable to play for health reasons.
^DNP2 Jaycee Marcelino will be unable to play due to personal reasons.
^REP1 Louie Vigil was selected as Christian Fajarito's replacement.
^REP2 Renz Palma was selected as Jaycee Marcelino's replacement.
^ST1 Marc Pingris was promoted to the starting lineup in place of Christian Fajarito.
^ST2 Jielo Razon was promoted to the starting lineup in place of Jaycee Marcelino.

=== Game ===
MPTV

September 7, 2024
8:00 pm

North All-Stars	95–91	South All-Stars
Scoring by quarter: 28–26, 21–21, 28–23, 18–21

Mayor Vitaliano D. Agan Coliseum, Zamboanga City

== Pre-game events ==
All three of the league's traditional pre-game events, including the Executives' Game, Three-Point Contest, and Slam Dunk Showdown, will make a return in this edition.

=== Executives' Game ===
The game was won by the South Division Executives for the second consecutive year, beating the North Division executives, 108–91. MPBL founder Manny Pacquiao won his third consecutive Executives' Game MVP award.

==== Lineups ====
North Executives
Representative	Team
Xandrie Cruz	Rizal Golden Coolers
Max Dayadante	Manila Batang Sampaloc
Aurelio Gonzales III	Pampanga Giant Lanterns
Francis Luakian	Caloocan Batang Kankaloo
Aljen Kaw	Nueva Ecija Rice Vanguards
Voltaire Ora	Valenzuela Classic
JC Tan	Quezon City Toda Aksyon
Jun Usman	San Juan Knights
Head coach: Frederick Dimatulac (Pampanga Giant Lanterns)

South Executives
Representative	Team
Jean Alabanza	Batangas City Tanduay Rum Masters
Aldriane Anglim	Bicolandia Oragons
JR Cawaling	Mindoro Tamaraws
Jojo Cunanan	Biñan Tatak Gel
Mermann Flores	South Cotabato Warriors
Kaizer Galvez	Muntinlupa Cagers
Jaggie Gregorio	Quezon Huskers
John Gilbor	Negros Muscovados
Rham Irahim	Zamboanga Master Sardines
Jay Javelosa	Iloilo United Royals
John Kallos	Sarangani Marlins
Alvin Munio	Zamboanga Master Sardines
Manny Pacquiao	N/A (MPBL founder)
Rafzan Ali Pendatun	Imus Agimat
Head coach: Mermann Flores (South Cotabato Warriors)

==== Game ====
MPTV

September 7, 2024
4:00 pm

North Executives	91–108	South Executives
Scoring by quarter: 22–30, 20–17, 27–18, 22–43

Mayor Vitaliano D. Agan Coliseum, Zamboanga City

=== Slam Dunk Showdown ===
The contestants for the Slam Dunk Showdown were revealed on August 21, 2024. The format was changed to have two dunks in the final round instead of one.

Contestants
Player	Team	First round	Final round
Joe Gomez de Llaño	Pampanga Giant Lanterns	100 (50+50)	94 (48+46)
CJ Gania	Negros Muscovados	100 (50+50)	79 (47+32)
Warlo Batac	Muntinlupa Cagers	93 (45+48)	DNQ
Mark Meneses	Pangasinan Heatwaves	88 (44+44)	DNQ
Rodel Gravera	Quezon Huskers	83 (39+44)	DNQ
Poypoy Actub	Biñan Tatak Gel	81 (31+50)	DNQ
Rhinwill Yambing	Quezon City Toda Aksyon	63 (33+30)	DNQ
Ximone Sandagon	Quezon Huskers	DNP	

Notes

- Player highlighted in gold is the event's defending champion.

=== Three-Point Shootout ===
The contestants for the Three-Point Shootout were revealed on August 20, 2024. The format was changed to have three rounds instead of two.

Contestants
Player	Team	First round (Tiebreaker)	Second round (Tiebreaker)	Final round
Orlan Wamar Jr.	San Juan Knights	18	15 (12)	16
AC Soberano	San Juan Knights	18	15 (11)	14
Ryan Sual	Sarangani Marlins	15	16	12
Yves Sazon	Bataan Risers	12	15 (5)	DNQ
Jeramer Cabanag	Caloocan Batang Kankaloo	14	13	DNQ
Jonathan Gesalem	Quezon City Toda Aksyon	10 (10)	11	DNQ
Choi Ignacio	Zamboanga Master Sardines	10 (6)	DNQ	
Wendel Comboy	Abra Weavers	10 (4)	DNQ	
Kurt Reyson	Pampanga Giant Lanterns	8	DNQ	
Domark Matillano	Quezon Huskers	7	DNQ	
Dennis Santos	Valenzuela Classic	7	DNQ	
Axel Iñigo	Pasay Voyagers	6	DNQ	
Ronnie Alonte	Biñan Tatak Gel	DNP		
Kraniel Villoria	Rizal Golden Coolers	DNP		

Notes

- Player highlighted in gold is the event's defending champion.
