= Chooks-to-Go 3x3 pro circuit teams =

Chooks-to-Go Pilipinas 3x3 pro circuit teams
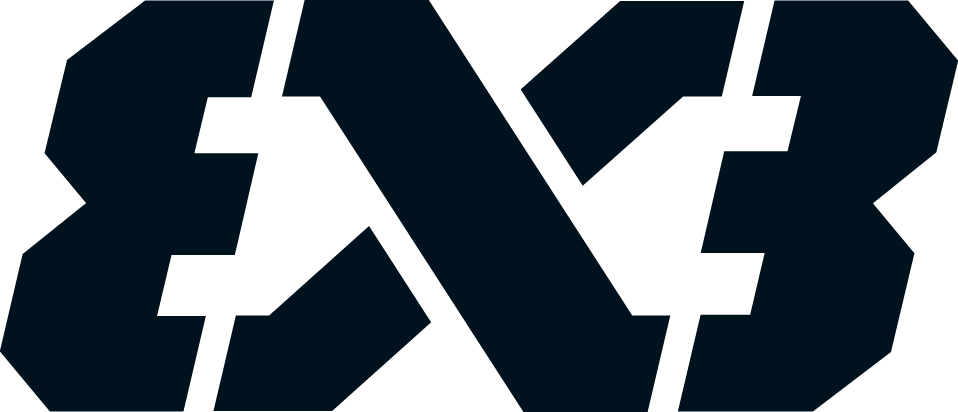
- Leagues: FIBA 3x3 World Tour
- Founded: 2019; 7 years ago
- Dissolved: 2023
- History: Pasig Chooks and Balanga Chooks (2019); Manila Chooks (2020–23); Cebu Chooks (2022)
- Location: Philippines
- Main sponsor: Bounty Agro Ventures (Chooks-to-Go)

Since the inception of the Chooks-to-Go Pilipinas 3x3 league in 2019 which is backed by Bounty Agro Ventures, Inc. (BAVI), multiple 3x3 team under the sponsorship of BAVI has been sent to the FIBA 3x3 Men's Pro Circuit which usually consists of the core of the winning team in a conference or tournament.

A total of three teams under the Chooks-to-Go name participated in level 10 (Masters) competitions of the FIBA 3x3 Men's Pro Circuit namely; Pasig Chooks, Balanga Chooks, and Manila Chooks TM; all three has featured in a FIBA 3x3 World Tour Masters tournament, although none has qualified in a World Tour Finals.

== History ==
The Philippines prior participation in the FIBA 3x3 Men's Pro Circuit and had teams participate in the FIBA 3x3 World Tour Masters. Two teams had participated in the FIBA 3x3 World Tour Finals; Manila West in the 2014 World Tour Finals in Sendai and Manila North in the 2015 World Tour Finals in Abu Dhabi.

In 2019, the Chooks-to-Go Pilipinas 3x3 league was formed in a bid to qualify the Philippine men's national team to the 2020 Summer Olympics in Tokyo by boosting the country's FIBA 3x3 men's rankings. In each season, the league host stand-alone tournaments called conferences, with the winner of each conference made as a basis for teams sent by the league to the FIBA 3x3 Men's Pro Circuit. League commissioner Eric Altamirano would initially oversee the company's 3x3 pro circuit program.

=== 2019 season ===
For the 2019 FIBA 3x3 World Tour, the Pasig Grindhouse Kings and the Bataan Risers were fielded by the Chooks-to-Go Pilipinas league in the pro circuit as "Pasig Chooks" and "Balanga Chooks" respectively.

Chooks-to-Go had both teams competing in the Doha Masters. Pasig Chooks qualified for the Doha Masters by winning the Chooks-to-Go President's Cup which was considered a quest-level tournament in the FIBA 3x3 pro circuit. The Chooks-to-Go also hosted the Chooks-to-Go 3x3 Asia Pacific Super Quest, a quest-level stand-alone tournament not part of its league structure in which Balanga Chooks qualified for the Doha Masters via their second-place finish. Pasig Chooks was bolstered by two European imports for the Doha Masters.

Balanga Chooks also participated in the Bucharest Challenger, a qualifier for the Debrecen Masters, with just three players due to Alvin Pasaol rendered unable to play due to visa issues. Pasig Chooks participated in the Kunshan Challenger, a qualifier for the Chengdu Masters. They fielded an all-Filipino lineup this time around. Pasig joined the Xiongan Challenger as well, which was a qualifier for the Los Angeles Masters.

Phenom-Basilan Steel was supposed to form as the basis of Chooks-to-Go's entry to the Jeddah Masters as the winners of the league's Patriot Cup but FIBA did not allow Chooks-to-Go to include Basilan player Troy Rike who has already played for Pasig within the 2019 season. Chooks-to-Go fielded Balanga Chooks instead for the Jeddah Masters and Basilan was given a place in the Manila Challenger and Sukhbaatar Challenger instead. Balanga did not get past the group stage of the Jeddah Masters, losing all of its two games.

=== 2020 season ===
For the 2020 season of the FIBA 3x3 World Tour, Chooks-to-Go Pilipinas 3x3 has fielded a team, which was named Manila Chooks TM.

Manila Chooks TM entered the Doha Masters with the same squad as the 2020 Chooks-to-Go Pilipinas 3x3 President's Cup titleholders, Zamboanga Family's Brand Sardines Aldin Ayo was named coach of Manila Chooks TM in November 2020. He replaced Eric Altamirano who resigned after two years of service. The team failed to progress to the semifinals, losing all two of their games in the preliminary round.

=== 2021 season ===
Manila Chooks TM joined the FIBA 3x3 pro circuit once again for the 2021 season, but with a different squad from the previous season. They are set to participate in the Doha Masters with a roster of players coming from different Maharlika Pilipinas Basketball League teams with Aldin Ayo still the team's head coach. They had to play in the qualifying draw against two other teams; Doha and Graz where a berth for main draw was contested. Manila won in overtime against Doha but lost to Graz. Graz advanced to the main draw but defeating Doha. Manila finished 13th out of 14 teams in the Doha Masters.

They later joined the Montreal Masters finishing 11th out of 12 teams. In the Abu Dhabi Masters in October, they finished 11th place again out of 14 teams. In that tournament's dunk contest, Manila Chooks player David Carlos bested Vadim Poddubchenko of Ukraine.

=== 2022 season ===
Cebu Chooks was formed to participate in the 3×3 Dubai Expo Super Quest in April 2022. They would qualify for the Manila Masters after clinching the Chooks-to-Go Asia Pacific Super Quest title. Aside from Cebu, Manila Chooks is also set to participate in the Manila Masters. Both teams finished as quarterfinalists.

In August 2022, Aldin Ayo resigned as head coach of Chooks-to-Go's 3x3 program. Veteran basketballer, Chico Lanete replaced him as interim head coach.

=== 2023 season ===
Liman coach Milan Isakov was tapped as an active consultant for Chooks-to-Go's teams starting the 2023 season. The Manila Masters was held with Manila Chooks representing the hosts.

At the Cebu Masters, Manila Chooks advanced to the knock-out stages, ending a 15-month drought, last repeating the feat at the May 2022 Manila Masters.

=== Disbandment ===
Chooks-to-Go ended its 3x3 program in November 2023.

== Teams ==
- Balanga Chooks (2019)
- Cebu Chooks (2022)
- Isabela City Chooks (2019)
- Manila Chooks (2020–23)
- Pasig Chooks (2019)

== Season-by-season records ==
FIBA 3x3 World Tour results (Masters and Finals)

Year	Teams	Tournament	Position	W	L
2019	Balanga Chooks	Doha Masters	6th place	2	1
2019	Pasig Chooks	Doha Masters	5th place	2	1
2020	Manila Chooks TM	Doha Masters	11th place	0	2
2021	Manila Chooks TM	Doha Masters	13th place (Qualifying draw)	1	1
2021	Manila Chooks TM	Montreal Masters	11th place	0	2
2021	Manila Chooks TM	Abu Dhabi Masters	11th place	0	2
2022	Cebu Chooks	Manila Masters	7th place	1	2
2022	Manila Chooks	Manila Masters	8th place	1	2
2023	Manila Chooks	Manila Masters	10th place	0	2

== See also ==
- Philippines at the FIBA 3x3 World Tour
- Philippines men's national 3x3 team
