= Mac Tallo =

Filipino basketball player

No. 13 – Basilan Steel
- Position: Point guard / Shooting guard
- League: MPBL

Personal information
- Born: January 2, 1994 (age 32) Cebu City, Philippines
- Listed height: 6 ft 0 in (1.83 m)
- Listed weight: 187 lb (85 kg)

Career information
- College: De La Salle (2012); SWU (2013–2017)
- PBA draft: 2017: 1st round, 10th overall pick
- Drafted by: TNT KaTropa
- Playing career: 2017–present

Career history
- 2017: TNT KaTropa
- 2018–2019: NLEX Road Warriors
- 2019: Bacolod Master Sardines
- 2019–2020: Manila Stars
- 2020: Bacolod Master Sardines
- 2021: Bicol Volcanoes
- 2023: Converge FiberXers
- 2024: Abra Weavers
- 2024: Davao Occidental Tigers
- 2024–2025: Pangasinan Abono Reapers / Heatwaves
- 2025: Cebu Greats
- 2026–present: Basilan Steel

Career highlights
- MPBL All-Star (2024); CESAFI champion (2014); 2× CESAFI MVP (2013, 2014)

Mark Jayven "Mac" Tallo (born January 2, 1994) is a Filipino professional basketball player for the Basilan Steel of the Maharlika Pilipinas Basketball League (MPBL).

== Career ==
=== First PBA stint ===
Tallo started his professional career with the Philippine Basketball Association (PBA, having been selected 10th overall by TNT KaTropa in the 2017 PBA draft. but later played for the NLEX Road Warriors.

=== First MPBL stint ===
Tallo has played in the Maharlika Pilipinas Basketball League (MPBL) specifically for the Bacolod Master Sardines, Manila Stars, and the Bicol Volcanoes.

=== Chooks-to-Go 3x3 ===
Tallo is also a 3x3 basketball player and has suited up for Chooks-to-Go's 3x3 pro circuit teams. until 2023.

=== Second PBA stint ===
He has played for the Converge FiberXers in a pre-season tournament in a lead up to the 2023–24 PBA season. He later signed a two-year contract with the team.

On February 7, 2024, his contract was terminated by the team after committing several ligang labas infractions.

=== Second MPBL stint ===
On March 13, 2024, Tallo would sign with the expansion side Abra Weavers for the 2024 MPBL season. Mid-season, Abra sent Tallo to the Davao Occidental Tigers in exchange for Jun Manzo.

== Career statistics ==
Legend
GP	Games played	MPG	Minutes per game
FG%	Field-goal percentage	3P%	3-point field-goal percentage	FT%	Free-throw percentage
RPG	Rebounds per game	APG	Assists per game	SPG	Steals per game
BPG	Blocks per game	PPG	Points per game	**Bold**	Career high

As of the end of 2023–24 season

=== PBA ===
Year	Team	GP	MPG	FG%	3P%	FT%	RPG	APG	SPG	BPG	PPG
2017–18	TNT	**17**	19.2	.352	.239	.640	2.0	**3.1**	**.7**	**.3**	6.1
2017–18	NLEX	**17**	19.2	.352	.239	.640	2.0	**3.1**	**.7**	**.3**	6.1
2019	NLEX	15	12.8	**.375**	**.292**	**1.000**	1.5	2.5	**.7**	.2	3.9
2023–24	Converge	5	**21.3**	.279	.250	**1.000**	**2.6**	2.0	.4	—	**7.0**
Career		37	16.9	.344	.255	.719	1.9	2.7	.6	.2	5.3
