= Franky Johnson =

American-Filipino basketball player

Free agent
- Position: Point guard

Personal information
- Born: August 15, 1993 (age 33) Vallejo, California, U.S.
- Listed height: 6 ft 1 in (1.85 m)
- Listed weight: 177 lb (80 kg)

Career information
- High school: Vanden (Fairfield, California)
- College: Virginia Union (2014–2015); Warner Pacific (2015–2016)
- PBA draft: 2021: 2nd round, 17th overall pick
- Drafted by: Rain or Shine Elasto Painters
- Playing career: 2021–present

Career history
- 2021: Rain or Shine Elasto Painters
- 2022–2023: Meralco Bolts
- 2025: Pacific Caesar

Career highlights
- IBL All-Star (2025)

Frank Victor Johnson (born August 15, 1993) is a Filipino-American professional basketball player. He has played in the Philippine Basketball Association (PBA) and internationally in 3×3 competitions, including The Asian Tournament. Johnson is known for his scoring ability, clutch performances, and contribution to Philippine 3×3 basketball. He was drafted by the Rain or Shine Elasto Painters in the 2021 PBA Draft and has competed for the Meralco Bolts in the PBA.

== Early life and college career ==
Franky Johnson was born in Vallejo, California. He attended Vanden High School in Fairfield, California, where he was a standout scorer and earned regional recognition.

He continued his collegiate career at Virginia Union University in Richmond, Virginia, where he played for the men’s basketball team during the 2014–15 season.

== Professional Career ==
=== 3×3 career ===
Before joining the Philippine Basketball Association (PBA), Franky Johnson gained recognition as a standout player in Philippine 3×3 basketball, competing in the Chooks-to-Go Pilipinas 3x3 league, known for his scoring ability and clutch play.

In the 2019 Chooks-to-Go Pilipinas 3x3 finale, Johnson hit a game-winning fadeaway deuce in overtime to lift Phenom-Basilan Steel over Balanga Pure, securing the PHP 1 million grand prize and a berth in the 2019 FIBA 3x3 World Tour Jeddah Masters. Johnson was awarded the Chooks 3×3 MVP that very same season after winning the finals.

In 2019, Johnson led Isabela City in the Sukhbaatar Cup, where his team faced international competition, including the dominant Serbian Novi Sad squad, highlighting his impact in Philippine 3×3 basketball. Johnson also won the two-point shootout at the FIBA 3x3 Challenger in Mongolia, becoming the first ever Filipino to win the shootout title at the event.

=== PBA career ===
Franky Johnson officially declared for the 2021 PBA Draft, joining a talented class of Fil-foreign guards.

Johnson was selected with the 17th overall pick by the Rain or Shine Elasto Painters.

On December 4, 2021, Johnson was traded from Rain or Shine to the Meralco Bolts in a one-for-one deal involving fellow Filipino-American guard Trevis Jackson.

During the 2022 PBA Philippine Cup playoffs, Franky Johnson was involved in a widely reported on-court altercation during a quarterfinals matchup.

=== International career ===
In 2024 after his PBA stint, Johnson joined the Zamboanga Valientes, becoming a key contributor in regional and international tournaments.Johnson found success internationally with the Zamboanga Valientes. He scored 36 points in a performance that helped the team reach the cusp of its first-ever The Asian Tournament finals appearance.

Johnson also starred in the Valientes’ victory over the Macau Black Bears in the Asian Cagefest tournament.

Johnson later helped Zamboanga Valientes defeat the Macau Black Bears again to capture the Asian tournament title, solidifying his role as a key contributor internationally.

== Indonesian Basketball League (IBL) ==
Johnson signed with Pacific Caesar Surabaya for the 2025 Indonesian Basketball League (IBL) season as a heritage player, with him having Indonesian heritage through his grandmother. Johnson serves as one of the team’s primary guards and offensive leaders.

=== Notable performances ===
- In a road victory against Hangtuah Jakarta, Johnson played 40 minutes, scoring 23 points, contributing to Pacific’s late-game momentum alongside AJ Bramah and Miguel Angel Miranda.
- In a home victory over Kesatria Bengawan Solo (110–104), Johnson played 40 minutes, scoring 29 points with 8 assists and 5 rebounds, including 5 three-pointers from 12 attempts. His scoring and perimeter shooting were instrumental in overcoming a halftime deficit and securing the final home win of the season.
- In the overtime victory against Bima Perkasa, Johnson scored 19 points, contributing significantly to Pacific’s offensive output in regulation and overtime alongside AJ Bramah and Miguel Miranda.
- In another game, Johnson recorded 20 points, 7 assists, and 4 rebounds, making 5 three-pointers from 12 attempts while playing all 40 minutes. He helped Pacific remain competitive alongside Miguel Miranda and AJ Bramah.
- In a separate game, Johnson set a personal single-game season record with 26 points, making 10 of 21 field goals, including 6 three-pointers from 12 attempts, helping Pacific compete closely against a strong opponent.
- In a later matchup, Johnson scored 18 points, contributing alongside Miguel Angel Miranda, while Pacific ultimately suffered a loss despite strong backcourt performances.
- In another game, Johnson scored 20 points, supporting the team alongside AJ Bramah (33 points) and Miguel Angel Miranda (26 points), helping Pacific remain competitive.
- Across the season, Johnson continued to contribute as a primary offensive guard in matchups including losses to Satria Muda Pertamina Jakarta and Dewa United Banten, maintaining scoring and playmaking responsibilities.

=== Season summary ===
Across the 2025 IBL season, Johnson appeared in 25 games for Pacific Caesar Surabaya, averaging 15.9 points, 3 rebounds, 4 assists, and 1.1 steals per game, establishing himself as a primary perimeter scoring and playmaking option for the team.

Ahead of the 2026 season, Pacific announced that they would not be able to retain Johnson as a heritage import due to the league rule changes for the 2026 season.

== Playing style ==
Franky Johnson is known for his scoring ability and physical style of play, which helped him transition successfully from 3×3 to 5-on-5 professional basketball.
