= Roi Sumang =

Filipino basketball player

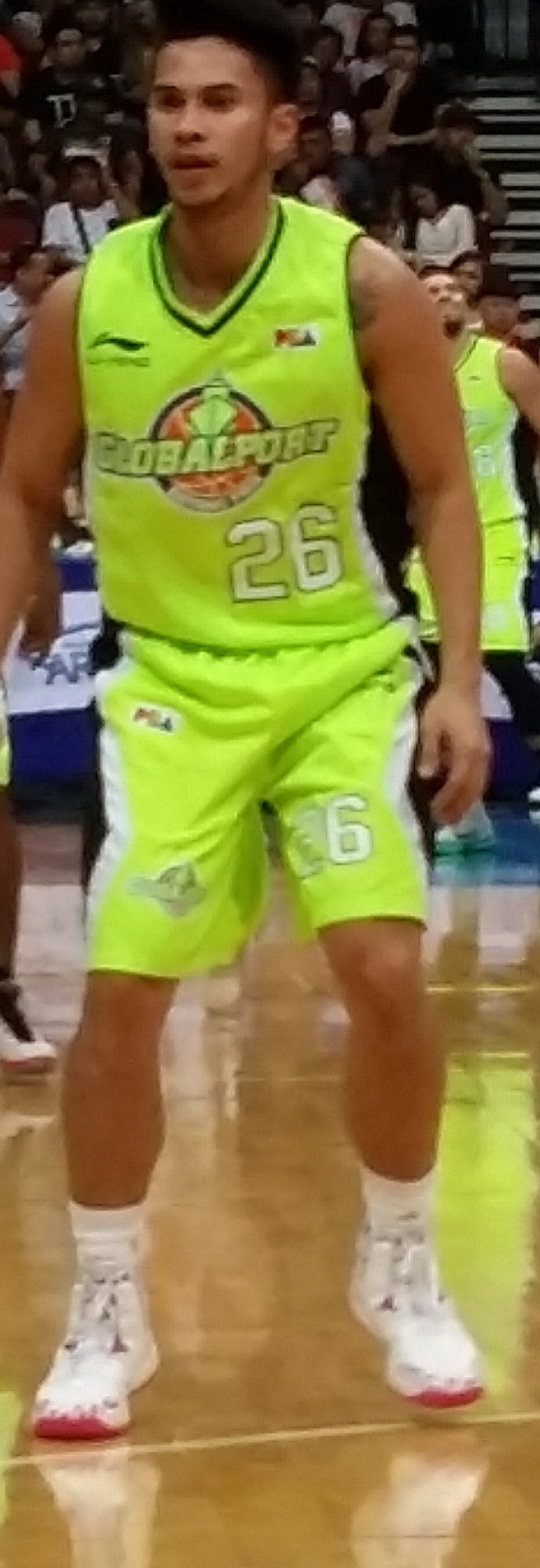
- Sumang with GlobalPort Batang Pier in 2015

No. 12 – Titan Ultra Giant Risers
- Position: Point guard
- League: PBA

Personal information
- Born: December 12, 1990 (age 35) Tondo, Manila, Philippines
- Listed height: 5 ft 8 in (1.73 m)
- Listed weight: 160 lb (73 kg)

Career information
- High school: Letran (Manila)
- College: UE
- PBA draft: 2015: 3rd round, 26th overall pick
- Drafted by: GlobalPort Batang Pier
- Playing career: 2015–present

Career history
- 2015–2016: GlobalPort Batang Pier
- 2016–2020: Blackwater Elite
- 2021: Nueva Ecija Rice Vanguards
- 2022–2023: NorthPort Batang Pier
- 2023: Nueva Ecija Rice Vanguards
- 2024: Abra Weavers
- 2025: Zamboanga Sikat
- 2025–present: Titan Ultra Giant Risers

Career highlights
- PBA Comeback Player of the Year (2023); 2× MPBL All-Star (2023, 2024); UAAP Mythical Team (2013)

Shej Roi Sumang (born December 12, 1990) is a Filipino professional basketball player for the Titan Ultra Giant Risers of the Philippine Basketball Association (PBA).

== Early life ==
He is the eldest of six children of Jess and Sheila Sumang. He grew up in the streets of Tondo, and already played basketball when he was a kid. He played for the Letran Squires in high school, where he became teammates with future PBA player Kevin Alas. He attended tryouts in Ateneo and San Beda, but he chose UE upon the proddings of former UE star and current PBA player Paul Lee, a fellow Tondo native. He dropped out of high school and was an out-of-school youth for two years playing pickup basketball games in different places, but his father convinced him to go back to school and play varsity ball.

== College career ==
Sumang first played for the UE Red Warriors in 2011. In his rookie year, he only averaged 5.2 points, 3.4 rebounds and 2.8 assist per game. The next season, he was one of the league leaders in several categories: third in scoring average (18.4 ppg), second in assists (4.9 apg), and fifth in steals (1.4 spg). In 2013, he increased his scoring average to 19.33 ppg, second in the league behind season MVP Terrence Romeo. He was included in the Mythical 5 selection for that same year. When Derrick Pumaren took the coaching reins for the Red Warriors in 2014, his scoring average dipped down to 13.0 points per outing, and was always at odds with his new coach. At one point, he was benched by Pumaren for leaving the school's quarters without permission, and was relegated to come off the bench after he lost his starting spot to Dan Alberto. In 2015, he elected to skip his fifth and final playing year in the UAAP, and instead saw action in the PBA D-League team, Tanduay Light Rhum Masters and opted to apply for the draft later that year.

== Professional career ==
Sumang was projected to be taken as early as the first round in different mock drafts, but to everyone's surprise, he was drafted in the third round (26th overall) by the GlobalPort Batang Pier in the 2015 PBA draft. His late selection in the draft drew reactions from fans, and was the top trending topic on Twitter that day. A few days later, he signed a two-year multi-million contract with GlobalPort. He and Rain or Shine guard and fellow UE alumnus Paul Lee shared the same agent and adviser in coach Lawrence Chongson. He is the team's third-string point guard, playing behind Terrence Romeo and Stanley Pringle.

== PBA career statistics ==
Legend
GP	Games played	MPG	Minutes per game	FG%	Field-goal percentage
3FG%	3-point field-goal percentage	4P%	4-point field-goal percentage	FT%	Free-throw percentage
RPG	Rebounds per game	APG	Assists per game	SPG	Steals per game
BPG	Blocks per game	PPG	Points per game	127	Career high

As of the end of 2025–26 season

=== Season-by-season averages ===
Year	Team	GP	MPG	FG%	3P%	4P%	FT%	RPG	APG	SPG	BPG	PPG
2015–16	GlobalPort	34	8.5	.405	.306	—	.615	1.0	.6	.4	.0	3.6
2015–16	Blackwater	34	8.5	.405	.306	—	.615	1.0	.6	.4	.0	3.6
2016–17	Blackwater	29	19.9	.432	.317	—	.840	2.0	2.8	.8	.0	9.0
2017–18	Blackwater	30	16.1	.391	.293	—	.756	2.0	2.5	.7	.0	6.8
2019	Blackwater	36	23.7	.432	.295	—	.797	2.7	4.1	1.3	.2	7.9
2020	Blackwater	11	25.2	.409	.222	—	.800	4.3	4.3	1.1	.1	10.4
2021	NorthPort	5	28.3	.484	.286	—	.875	2.6	5.0	.6	.2	8.2
2022–23	NorthPort	32	23.8	.450	.345	—	.702	3.4	4.4	1.0	.0	8.8
2025–26	Titan Ultra	14	13.1	.431	.452	.000	1.000	1.4	1.7	.6	.1	6.3
Career		191	18.7	.426	.320	.000	.773	2.3	2.9	.8	.1	7.3
