= Gold's Gym–Pasig Kings =

- Leagues: Chooks-to-Go Pilipinas 3x3
- Founded: 2019; 7 years ago
- History: Pasig Grindhouse Kings (2019); Pasig Chooks (FIBA 3x3 World Tour 2019); Gold's Gym–Pasig Kings (2019–present)
- Location: Pasig, Philippines
- Main sponsor: Grind House Fitness (2019); Chooks-to-Go (FIBA 3x3 World Tour); Gold's Gym (2019–present)
- Conference titles: 1 conference 2019 President's Cup

The Gold's Gym–Pasig Kings are a Philippine men's 3-on-3 basketball team that last played in the Chooks-to-Go Pilipinas 3x3 league. They were the champions of the first league conference, the 2019 President's Cup.

== History ==
The Kings as the Pasig Grind house Kings was among the teams that participated in the inaugural season of the Chooks-to-Go Pilipinas 3x3 league. They won the overall title of the first conference of the league, the President's Cup and won a berth to become one of the Philippines' representative teams at the 2019 FIBA 3x3 World Tour Masters in Doha, Qatar. Pasig along the 1Bataan Risers also qualified for the inaugural 2019 FIBA Asia-Pacific Super Quest to be hosted in the Philippines on account of their overall performance in the conference.

At the 2019 FIBA Asia-Pacific Super Quest, they finished third place, losing to eventual champions Tokyo Dime.exe in the semifinal. They also qualified to play in the Kunshan Challengers due to their finishing in the tournament. In the Doha Masters of the 2019 FIBA 3x3 World Tour, they reached the knockout stage losing to Riga Ghetto in the quarterfinals.

Fielding an all-Filipino lineup, the same lineup that won the Chooks-to-Go Pilipinas President's Cup title, failed to advance to the knockout stage in the Kunshan Challenger losing to Sosnovy BorCopRosatom and Liman. They are set to participate in the Tinkoff Moscow 2019 in Russia in a bid to qualify for the Prague Masters

In the Patriot Cup of the Cooks-To-Go 3x3 league, the team competed as the Gold's Gym–Pasig Kings.

== Players ==
=== Current roster ===
The following is Pasig's roster for the 2019 FIBA 3x3 Kunshan Challenger.

Pasig Grindhouse Kings roster
Players
Coaches

| Pos. | No. | Nat. | Name | Ht. | Wt. | Age |
|---|---|---|---|---|---|---|
| | | (Philippines) | Munzon, Joshua |
| | | (Philippines) | Ababou, Dylan | 1.91 m (6 ft 3 in) | 84 kg (185 lb) | 39 – 7 December 1986 |
| | | (Philippines) | Statham, Taylor |
| | | (Philippines) | Rike, Troy |

Head coach

N/A

Legend

- (C) Team captain
- (R) Reserve
- Injured

Past Rosters (FIBA 3x3 World Tour)

- 2019 FIBA 3x3 World Tour
    - Joshua Munzon
    - Nikola Pavlovic
    - Statham Taylor
    - Angelo Tsagarakis – Doha Masters

== FIBA 3x3 World Tour participation ==
- 2019 3x3 FIBA World Tour
  - Masters:
    - Doha: Quarterfinals
    - Chengdu: Did not qualify
    - Prague: To be determined
  - Final
    - Utsunomiya: To be determined

== Trophies and awards ==
- Chooks-to-Go Pilipinas 3x3 President's Cup: (1)
  - 2019
