= MPBL All-Star Game =

Exhibition game hosted by the Maharlika Pilipinas Basketball League

- Frequency: Annual
- Inaugurated: 2019 (Pasay)
- Previous event: 2025 (Biñan, Laguna)
- Next event: 2026 (Rodriguez, Rizal)
- Participants: North Division and South Division all-stars
- Organizer: Maharlika Pilipinas Basketball League

The MPBL All-Star Game is an exhibition game hosted by the Maharlika Pilipinas Basketball League and showcases a selection of the league's star players. It is the main event of the greater MPBL All-Star Day, held during the latter part of the regular season alongside a series of pre-game events within the same day. The first All-Star Game was played at the SM Mall of Asia Arena on March 2, 2019.

The two teams, representing the two divisions (North and South), are composed of fifteen players from the representing division. The head coaches of the team with the best record in each division leading up to All-Star gameday are chosen to coach their respective teams.

== Background ==
The MPBL All-Star Game was introduced during the league's second season, the 2018–19 season. The first edition of the event took place on March 2, 2019, at the SM Mall of Asia Arena in Pasay. Two teams from each division, with fifteen players (thirteen players in 2022), are matched against one another. The teams are led by the head coach of the team with the best record in each division.

The 2020 edition also took place at SM Mall of Asia Arena, but since then the All-Star Game has been hosted by one of its teams in its primary home venue. The Batangas City Embassy Chill hosted the 2022 edition at Batangas City Coliseum while the Bataan Risers hosted the 2023 edition at Bataan People's Center.

The 2024 edition was the first to take place outside Luzon, with the Zamboanga Master Sardines hosting the event at Mayor Vitaliano D. Agan Coliseum in Zamboanga City. In 2024, on top of the fifteen selections for each division, one homegrown player was also selected as an additional all-star. The 2025 edition will then take place at Alonte Sports Arena in Biñan, Laguna.

The All-Star Game is usually preceded by a series of pre-game events. The Executives' Game, Three-Point Shootout, and Slam Dunk Showdown have become regular events, appearing in every All-Star gameday from the beginning.

== All-Star Game results ==
This is a list of each All-Star Game, the venue at which it was played, and the Game MVP. Parenthesized numbers indicate the number of times that venue, city, or player has occurred as of that instance (e.g. "Jeff Viernes (2)" in 2020 indicates that was his second All-Star MVP award). The South Division currently leads the all-time series, 4–2, over the North Division, with only one draw.

| North Division (2 wins) | South Division (4 wins) | 1 tied |

| Year | Result | Host arena | Host city | MVP |
|---|---|---|---|---|
| 2019 | South 109, North 84 | SM Mall of Asia Arena | Pasay | Jeff Viernes, Batangas City Athletics |
| 2020 | South 126, North 122 (OT) | SM Mall of Asia Arena (2) | Pasay (2) | Jeff Viernes (2), Batangas City Athletics |
| 2022 | South 109, North 92 | Batangas City Coliseum | Batangas City, Batangas | Jaycee Marcelino, Zamboanga Family's Brand Sardines |
| 2023 | North 99, South 91 | Bataan People's Center | Balanga, Bataan | Justine Baltazar, Pampanga Giant Lanterns |
| 2024 | North 95, South 91 | Mayor Vitaliano D. Agan Coliseum | Zamboanga City | Will McAloney, Nueva Ecija Rice Vanguards |
| 2025 | South 82, North 81 | Alonte Sports Arena | Biñan, Laguna | Judel Fuentes, Quezon Huskers |
| 2026 | North 89, South 89 | Ynares Center Montalban | Rodriguez, Rizal | Dave Ildefonso, Abra Weavers; Judel Fuentes, Quezon Huskers |
