= Zamboanga Valientes =

- League: MVBA (2006–2008); NBC (2006–2008); Liga Pilipinas (2008–2011); NBL–Pilipinas (2018–2021, 2026–); MPBL (2018); Chooks-to-Go Pilipinas 3x3 (2019–2022); Pilipinas VisMin Super Cup (2021–2023); PBA 3x3 (2021–2022); ABL (2023); The Asian Tournament (2024–present)
- Founded: 2006
- History: Zamboanga Latinos (2006–2008); Zamboanga Amores (2008–2010); Zamboanga Family's Brand Sardines Valientes (2018); Zamboanga Peninsula Valientes MLV (2020–present)
- Location: Zamboanga City, Philippines
- Team colors: Red, Dark Violet, White, Black
- Head coach: Bobedick delos Santos
Home	Away	Third

The Zamboanga Valientes, also known as the Zamboanga Peninsula Valientes MLV, are a Filipino professional basketball team based in the Zamboanga Peninsula. The team has competed in numerous leagues since its founding in 2006.

The team first competed as the Zamboanga Latinos when it was part of both the Mindanao Visayas Basketball Association (MVBA) and National Basketball Conference (NBC). Following the merge of the both leagues into Liga Pilipinas in 2008, the team was renamed to Zamboanga Amores and competed until 2010.

Eight years later, the team was revived in 2018 as part of the Maharlika Pilipinas Basketball League's (MPBL) national expansion under its current moniker. However, undisclosed management issues led to the MPBL department splitting in 2019. Since the split, the Valientes have continued to compete in a variety of leagues and have also fielded a 3x3 team.

== History ==
=== Early history ===
The Zamboanga Valientes was established in 2006 by Lando Navarro as a means to give a platform for Zamboangueño basketball players. The team has participated in various commercial and regional leagues including the National Basketball Conference in 2006, and the Liga Pilipinas in 2008. After Lando's death, the club was taken over by Cory Navarro and Mike Venezuela, affiliated with the MLV Accounting.

=== Maharlika Pilipinas Basketball League ===
The team played in the Maharlika Pilipinas Basketball League (MPBL) as the Zamboanga Family's Brand Sardines Valientes, as an expansion team for the 2018–19 season.

Due to management issues, however, the team announced that it will relaunch as the Zamboanga Family's Brand Sardines beginning with the 2019 calendar year. The move effectively split the team into two, with the relaunched ZFAMS succeeding the Valientes in the MPBL while the Valientes themselves continue to compete in other leagues.

=== Chooks-to-Go Pilipinas 3x3 ===
The Zamboanga Valientes was among the pioneer teams of the Chooks-to-Go Pilipinas 3x3 league which played in the inaugural season in 2018. The 2020 season saw both the Valientes and Family Brand's Sardines compete, marking the first time both teams competed in the same league since the aforementioned split.

For the 2020 season which was organized within a "bubble" format due to the COVID-19 pandemic, the Valientes fielded an all-Zamboangeño team, with all players native to Zamboanga City.

=== Pilipinas VisMin Super Cup ===
The Zamboanga Valientes as JPS Zamboanga City MLV fielded a team at the Pilipinas VisMin Super Cup.

=== PBA 3x3 ===
Zamboanga Valientes received an invitation to participate in the inaugural season of the PBA 3x3 league in 2021. It became the first non-franchise team to confirm its participation in the PBA league. The team took a leave of absence for the second conference of the season due to its roster being hampered by injuries.

=== ASEAN Basketball League ===
On November 26, 2022, it was announced that the Valientes would be the Philippine representatives for the ABL Invitational 2023.

=== Potential acquisition of Terrafirma Dyip ===
On April 28, 2025, it was reported that the Valientes were in talks to acquire the Terrafirma Dyip franchise of the Philippine Basketball Association (PBA). Team owner Junjie Navarro stated confirmed in an article with SPIN.ph that the team has met with Terrafirma and that "it's almost a done deal". This came a few days after Starhorse Shipping Lines' attempted acquisition of the Terrafirma franchise fell through.

=== Other ===
After the 2020 Chooks-to-Go Pilipinas 3x3 season, Zamboanga Valientes decided to begin competing in international tournaments. They competed and won the title in the 3X3 Christmas Hustle which was organized in Canberra, Australia in December 2020.

== Management ==
The Zamboanga Valientes is supported by local businesspeople Cory Navarro and Mike Venezuela and had sanction from former Zamboanga City mayor Beng Climaco. Joseph Romarante is the team's vice president.

== Season by season ==
Champions	Season champions	Runners-up	Finals berth

Season	League	Regular season					Playoffs	Head coach
Season	League	Finish	Played	Wins	Losses	Win%	Playoffs	Head coach
2023	ABL	6th	14	7	7	.500	Did not qualify	Expedito de los Santos

== 2024 roster ==
Zamboanga Valientes roster
Players
Coaches

Pos.	No.	Nat.	Name	Ht.	Wt.	DOB (YYYY-MM-DD)	From
G	5	(Philippines)	Alfaro, Peter	1.80 m (5 ft 11 in)			San Beda
F	11	(Philippines) (United States)	Benson, AJ	1.96 m (6 ft 5 in)			College of St. Benilde
SF	24	(Philippines)	Ferrer, Jerome	1.91 m (6 ft 3 in)
G/F	3	(Philippines)	Gracia, Joewish	1.80 m (5 ft 11 in)
G	12	(Philippines)	Esa, Das	1.78 m (5 ft 10 in)		31 – 12 November 1994
G	17	(Philippines)	Alcantara, Job	1.78 m (5 ft 10 in)
SF	14	(Philippines)	Salim, Med	1.93 m (6 ft 4 in)
SF	16	(United States)	Johnson, Franky (WI)	1.88 m (6 ft 2 in)	75 kg (165 lb)	32 – 15 August 1993
G	8	(Philippines)	Lingganay, Rudy (C)	1.78 m (5 ft 10 in)	77 kg (170 lb)	39 – 5 August 1986	Batangas City Tanduay Rum Masters
PF	15	(United States)	Cousins, DeMarcus (WI)	2.08 m (6 ft 10 in)	122 kg (269 lb)	35 – 13 August 1990	Taiwan Mustangs
F	28	(Philippines)	Belo, Mac	1.93 m (6 ft 4 in)	84 kg (185 lb)	33 – 12 February 1993	Free agent
C	10	(Senegal)	Diouf, Malick (WI)	2.11 m (6 ft 11 in)
G	13	(Philippines)	Tolomia, Mike	1.80 m (5 ft 11 in)	82 kg (181 lb)	33 – 6 January 1993
PF	45	(United States)	Evans, Nick (WI)	2.10 m (6 ft 11 in)	113 kg (249 lb)	38 – 14 April 1988
F	4	(United States)	Akpuru, Ik (WI)	2.01 m (6 ft 7 in)

Head coach

- (Philippines) Expedito de los Santos

Assistant coach(es)

- (Philippines) Paolo Romero

Legend

- (C) Team captain
- (WI) World import
- (AI) ASEAN heritage import
- Injured

This is the lineup of the Valientes for The Asian Tournament.

== Notable players ==
- Ryan Buenafe
- Mario Chalmers
- Mac Cardona
- DeMarcus Cousins
- Chito Jaime
- Reed Juntilla
- Jaycee Marcelino
- Eric Rodriguez
