= Chico Lanete =

Filipino basketball player (born 1979)

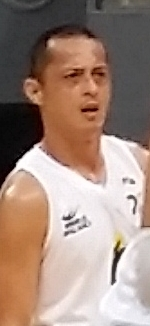
- Lanete in 2015

LPU Cavite HS
- Title: Head coach
- League: NCAA Philippines

Personal information
- Born: August 1, 1979 (age 47) Ormoc City, Philippines
- Listed height: 6 ft 0 in (1.83 m)
- Listed weight: 180 lb (82 kg)

Career information
- College: Lyceum
- PBA draft: 2006: Undrafted
- Playing career: 2007–2022
- Position: Point guard
- Coaching career: 2022–present

Career history

Playing
- 2007–2009: Purefoods Tender Juicy Giants
- 2009: Barangay Ginebra Kings
- 2009–2010: Burger King Whoppers
- 2010–2011: Powerade Tigers
- 2011–2012: Meralco Bolts
- 2012: Barako Bull Energy
- 2012–2014: Petron Blaze Boosters / San Miguel Beermen
- 2014–2016: Barako Bull Energy
- 2016–2017: Phoenix Fuel Masters
- 2017–2019: San Miguel Beermen
- 2020–2021: Sarangani Marlins
- 2021: Bicol Volcanoes

Coaching
- 2022–2023: Chooks-to-Go 3x3 (pro-circuit teams)
- 2026–present: LPU Cavite HS

Career highlights
- 3× PBA champion (2017–18 Philippine, 2019 Philippine, 2019 Commissioner's); PBA All-Rookie Team (2008); 3× PBL champion (2006 Unity, 2006-07 Silver, 2007 Unity); 2× PBL Finals MVP (2006-07 Silver, 2007 Unity); PBL Mythical First Team (2007 Unity)

Chico A. Lanete (born August 1, 1979) is a Filipino professional basketball coach and former player. He is the head coach for the LPU Cavite HS. In 5×5 full court basketball, he last played for the Bicol Volcanoes of the Maharlika Pilipinas Basketball League (MPBL). He grew up in Isabela, Basilan and then played for Southern City Colleges in Zamboanga City during college before moving to Lyceum of the Philippines University.

== College career ==
Lanete and his brother Von both played for Southern City Colleges in Zamboanga City before the latter moved to Cebu and played for the University of the Visayas Green Lancers under coach Boy Cabahug, and the former to the Lyceum of the Philippines University.

== Professional career ==
Lanete was an undrafted player in the 2007 PBA draft but was later signed by the Purefoods Tender Juicy Giants before moving to the Barangay Ginebra Kings.

In 2009, he was signed by the Burger King Whoppers.

On January 5, 2010, he and Gary David were traded to the Coca-Cola Tigers for Alex Cabagnot and Wesley Gonzales.

In late 2011, Lanete was signed by the Meralco Bolts.

On January 25, 2012, Lanete was traded by Meralco to the Barako Bull Energy in exchange for Paul Artadi.

On March 20, 2012, Lanete was traded to the Petron Blaze Boosters in exchange for forward Marc Agustin.

On August 24, 2014, in the day of the 2014 PBA draft, Lanete returned to the Energy after being traded along with Jojo Duncil, San Miguel's 2014 second round pick (who turned out to be Gab Banal) and their 2016 first round pick in exchange of Barako Bull's 2014 third overall pick (which San Miguel used to pick Ronald Pascual).

== Coaching career ==
Lanete was appointed as assistant coach to Eric Altamirano who will be guiding three Chooks-to-Go Pilipinas 3x3 teams that will participate in FIBA 3x3 tournaments. He will also help preparations of the Philippines men's national 3x3 team in the 2020 Summer Olympics qualifiers.

When Aldin Ayo resigned as head coach of the Chooks-to-Go 3x3 program in August 2022, Lanete was named as interim head coach.

== PBA career statistics ==
Legend
GP	Games played	MPG	Minutes per game
FG%	Field-goal percentage	3P%	3-point field-goal percentage	FT%	Free-throw percentage
RPG	Rebounds per game	APG	Assists per game	SPG	Steals per game
BPG	Blocks per game	PPG	Points per game	**Bold**	Career high

=== Season-by-season averages ===
Year	Team	GP	MPG	FG%	3P%	FT%	RPG	APG	SPG	BPG	PPG
2007–08	Purefoods	**49**	18.8	.364	.309	.768	2.6	2.2	1.0	**.1**	6.7
2008–09	Purefoods / Barangay Ginebra	46	18.8	.335	.234	**.787**	2.5	1.8	.9	**.1**	5.5
2009–10	Burger King / Coca-Cola	29	22.7	.426	.290	.587	3.2	2.8	1.2	.0	7.9
2010–11	Powerade	28	**25.4**	.371	.321	.774	**4.0**	**3.0**	1.0	.0	7.3
2011–12	Meralco / Barako Bull / Petron	32	17.0	.324	.194	.735	2.3	2.8	.9	**.1**	5.2
2012–13	Petron	32	12.8	.402	.284	.571	1.2	1.3	.9	**.1**	4.0
2013–14	Petron / San Miguel	26	8.7	.361	.160	.647	.7	.7	.7	.0	2.6
2014–15	Barako Bull	34	24.9	**.433**	.172	.709	2.8	2.3	**2.0**	**.1**	**10.0**
2015–16	Barako Bull / Phoenix	35	17.6	.389	.214	.686	2.2	1.4	.9	.0	5.2
2016–17	Phoenix	25	8.3	.311	.267	.632	.6	1.0	.5	.0	2.4
2017–18	San Miguel	20	8.1	.426	**.444**	.417	1.4	1.0	.6	.0	2.8
2019	San Miguel	20	3.3	.429	.250	.333	.6	.8	.0	.0	1.6
Career		376	15.5	.380	.261	.637	2.0	1.7	.8	.1	5.1

== Personal life ==
Lanete's father was a college basketball player while his brothers Von Harry (Bon Bon) and Garvo are also basketball players, with the latter also playing in the PBA for six years.
