= Joshua Munzon =

Filipino-American basketball player (born 1995)

No. 24 – Titan Ultra Giant Risers
- Position: Shooting guard / small forward
- League: PBA

Personal information
- Born: January 15, 1995 (age 31) Long Beach, California, U.S.
- Listed height: 6 ft 4 in (1.93 m)
- Listed weight: 200 lb (91 kg)

Career information
- High school: Long Beach Polytechnic (Long Beach, California)
- College: Cal State LA (2012–2016)
- PBA draft: 2020: 1st round1st overall (Note: The 2021 draft was composed of two drafts: the Gilas special round, which consists of 4 players reserved for the Gilas Pilipinas program, and the regular draft. Munzon was selected as the first pick of the regular draft.)
- Drafted by: Terrafirma Dyip
- Playing career: 2016–present

Career history
- 2016–2017: Saigon Heat
- 2017–2018: Westports Malaysia Dragons
- 2018: iECO Green Warriors
- 2021–2022: Terrafirma Dyip
- 2023–2025: NorthPort Batang Pier
- 2025–present: Titan Ultra Giant Risers

Career highlights
- 2× PBA All-Defensive Team (2024, 2025); PBA All-Rookie Team (2021); PBA Most Improved Player (2025)

Joshua Eugene Richardson Munzon (born January 22, 1995) is a Filipino-American professional basketball player for the Titan Ultra Giant Risers of the Philippine Basketball Association (PBA).

== Early life and collegiate career ==
Joshua Eugene Munzon was born on January 15, 1995, in Long Beach, California with his father being Filipino. For his collegiate education, Munzon attended and graduated from the California State University in Los Angeles Prior to committing to the 3x3 variant of basketball, Munzon played competitive 5-a-side basketball. In college, he played for the Cal State LA Golden Eagles in the NCAA Division II.

== Professional career ==
=== Saigon Heat (2016–2017) ===
In 2016 shortly after graduating from college, he moved to Vietnam to join the Saigon Heat of the ASEAN Basketball League (ABL) to start his professional basketball career. He played in the ABL as a "heritage player" for non-Philippine teams owing to his Filipino lineage. He was part of Saigon Heat until January 2017.

=== Westports Malaysia Dragons (2017–2018) ===
Shortly after playing for Heat, he joined the Westports Malaysia Dragons in February 2017 and was part of the team for the rest of 2016–17 ABL season. After the season, Munzon and Westport could not agree on a contract and Muzon sought to play for another ABL team. However the Malaysian team did not agree to release him to play for another ABL team due to what Munzon claims to be a result of a "gentlemen's agreement" that players will have to wait for a year before playing for another team.

For the meantime, Munzon suited up for PEA in the Thailand Basketball League in 2017. Munzon returned to the ABL rejoined the Westports Malaysia Dragons in late December 2017.

=== iECO Green Warriors (2018) ===
In 2018, Munzon had a brief stint with the iECO Green Warriors, a PBA Developmental League selection team, which played in Asia League's The Terrific 12 tournament in Macau.

=== FIBA 3x3 Pro Circuit and Chooks-to-Go Pilipinas 3x3 (2019) ===
Munzon has played in the FIBA 3x3 World Tour. For the 2019 iteration, he played for Pasig Chooks.

In the domestic scene, Munzon plays in the Chooks-to-Go Pilipinas 3x3 league. It was in late 2018, that the proponents of the league reached out to Munzon to play 3x3. His participation in the 2019 season helped in boosting the Philippines FIBA 3x3 Federation ranking that qualified the country's national team's participation in the 2020 Summer Olympics qualifiers. In the process, Munzon became part of the Top 100 of the individual FIBA 3x3 rankings at rank 89th and became the top-ranked Filipino player by June 2019.

=== Terrafirma Dyip (2021–2022) ===
On March 14, 2021, Munzon was selected first overall by the Terrafirma Dyip in the PBA season 46 draft.

=== NorthPort Batang Pier (2023–2025) ===
On January 12, 2023, Munzon was traded to the NorthPort Batang Pier for Kevin Ferrer. In June 2024, he signed a two-year contract extension with the Batang Pier. On October 5, 2025, Munzon wins the 2024–25 Most Improved Player award.

== PBA career statistics ==
Legend
GP	Games played	MPG	Minutes per game	FG%	Field-goal percentage
3FG%	3-point field-goal percentage	4P%	4-point field-goal percentage	FT%	Free-throw percentage
RPG	Rebounds per game	APG	Assists per game	SPG	Steals per game
BPG	Blocks per game	PPG	Points per game	127	Career high

As of the end of 2025–26 season

=== Season-by-season averages ===
Year	Team	GP	MPG	FG%	3P%	4P%	FT%	RPG	APG	SPG	BPG	PPG
2021	Terrafirma	9	30.5	.403	.242	—	.758	3.4	2.6	1.3	.2	16.6
2022–23	Terrafirma	33	25.4	.323	.240	—	.641	3.2	1.9	1.0	.3	9.8
2022–23	NorthPort	33	25.4	.323	.240	—	.641	3.2	1.9	1.0	.3	9.8
2023–24	NorthPort	24	29.8	.389	.263	—	.796	3.5	3.4	2.5	.2	12.3
2024–25	NorthPort	39	34.3	.410	.272	.200	.793	3.7	3.9	2.0	.3	15.7
2025–26	Titan Ultra	33	34.0	.406	.304	.130	.730	4.1	4.3	2.1	.4	19.7
Career		138	31.1	.387	.265	.167	.743	3.6	3.3	1.8	.3	14.7

== National team career ==
Munzon is only eligible to play for the Philippine national basketball team as a "naturalized" player despite his Filipino heritage through his father since he acquired a Philippine passport after turning age 16 as per FIBA eligibility rules. He instead represents the country through its national 3x3 team.
