= Troy Rike =

Filipino-American basketball player and content creator

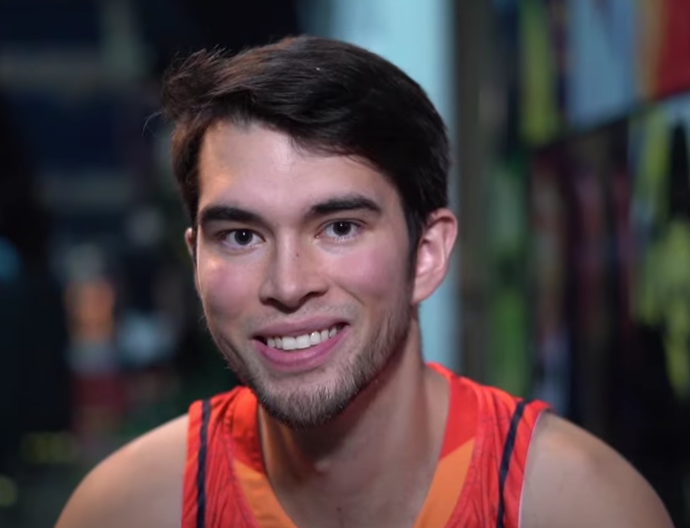
- Rike in 2022

Personal information
- Born: October 5, 1995 (age 31) San Francisco, California, U.S.
- Listed height: 6 ft 7 in (2.01 m)
- Listed weight: 102 kg (225 lb)

Career information
- High school: St. Ignatius (San Francisco, California)
- College: Wake Forest (2014–2018); NU (2018)
- PBA draft: 2020: 1st round11th overall (Note: The 2021 draft was composed of two drafts: the Gilas special round, which consists of 4 players reserved for the Gilas Pilipinas program, and the regular draft. Rike was selected as the 11th pick of the regular draft.)
- Drafted by: NorthPort Batang Pier
- Playing career: 2021–2022
- Position: Power forward / center

Career history
- 2021–2022: NorthPort Batang Pier

Troy Edward Verzosa Rike (born October 5, 1995) is a Filipino-American content creator and former professional basketball player. He last played for the NorthPort Batang Pier of Philippine Basketball Association (PBA). He played college basketball for four seasons with Wake Forest, before transferring to National University.

== High school and college career ==
=== St. Ignatius College Preparatory ===
Rike played for St. Ignatius College Preparatory in California. Aside from basketball, he was also on the crew/rowing team.

=== Wake Forest ===
Rike joined the Wake Forest Demon Deacons in 2014 via walk-on. Over his four seasons there, he only appeared in 23 games.

=== National University ===
Rike announced on Twitter that he would be joining the NU Bulldogs for Season 81. He was eligible to play that season without red-shirting because he was a graduate student at the time. He debuted with six points and seven rebounds in 15 minutes. On August 26, 2018, he was arrested and detained against his will by agents of the Bureau of Immigration (BI) over questions about his nationality. He was released after more than 24 hours. In his final game with NU, he had 17 points and 13 rebounds.

== Professional career ==
=== FIBA 3x3 Pro Circuit and Chooks-to-Go Pilipinas 3x3 (2019–20) ===
Rike played for the Pasig Grindhouse Kings, beginning in the inaugural leg of Chooks-to-Go Pilipinas 3x3. His team claimed the President's Cup. Then, they competed in the 2019 Kunshan Challenger, but were eliminated early. They also made the semifinals of the Chooks-to-Go Asia Pacific Super Quest.

For the Patriot's Cup, Rike played for Phenom-Basilan Steel. They upset Wilkins-Balanga Pure, 21–20 in the Finals, making them champions and qualifying them for the 2019 FIBA 3x3 Jeddah Masters.

Rike returned to playing for Pasig for the FIBA 3x3 Xiong An Challenger. At the end of the season, he initially thought about getting drafted into the PBA, but then had a change of heart and withdrew his name from the 2019 PBA draft.

In the 2020 President's Cup, he played for Zamboanga Chooks-to-Go. Again, his team claimed the President's Cup. He finished his 3x3 career as the no. 5 player in the country.

=== NorthPort Batang Pier (2021–2022) ===
After two years in the 3x3 circuit, Rike declared for the 2020 PBA Draft. He was drafted by the NorthPort Batang Pier with the 11th pick. He was signed to a two-year contract. In the 2021 Philippine Cup, he had a career-high 20 points on six threes, along with eight rebounds and three blocks, which came in NorthPort's win over the Phoenix Super LPG Fuel Masters.

Rike was not able to play in the 2022 Philippine Cup due to him taking a leave of absence. He did not return to the team that entire season. As of 2025, he has no plans of returning to the PBA.

== Career statistics ==
=== PBA ===
Legend
GP	Games played	MPG	Minutes per game
FG%	Field-goal percentage	3P%	3-point field-goal percentage	FT%	Free-throw percentage
RPG	Rebounds per game	APG	Assists per game	SPG	Steals per game
BPG	Blocks per game	PPG	Points per game	**Bold**	Career high

=== Season-by-season averages ===
Year	Team	GP	MPG	FG%	3P%	FT%	RPG	APG	SPG	BPG	PPG
2021	NorthPort	24	13.6	.457	.432	.500	2.7	.3	.2	.3	3.8
Career		24	13.6	.457	.432	.500	2.7	.3	.2	.3	3.8

=== NCAA ===
Legend
GP	Games played	GS	Games started	MPG	Minutes per game
FG%	Field goal percentage	3P%	3-point field goal percentage	FT%	Free throw percentage
RPG	Rebounds per game	APG	Assists per game	SPG	Steals per game
BPG	Blocks per game	PPG	Points per game	**Bold**	Career high

Year	Team	GP	GS	MPG	FG%	3P%	FT%	RPG	APG	SPG	BPG	PPG
2014–15	Wake Forest	4	0	**1.5**	.000	.000	**.500**	.5	**.3**	.0	.0	0.3
2015–16	Wake Forest	5	0	1.4	.500	.000	.000	**1.2**	.0	.0	.0	0.4
2016–17	Wake Forest	5	0	1.2	1.000	.000	.000	.8	.0	.0	.0	0.4
2017–18	Wake Forest	**9**	1	1.3	**.429**	.000	**.706**	.0	.1	.0	.0	**0.8**
Career		23	1	1.3	.455	.333	.333	.5	.1	.0	.0	0.5

== National team career ==
Rike was named to the "23-for-2023" pool, which was composed of young players for the 2023 FIBA World Cup. Along with other Gilas Cadets, he played in the 2018 FilOil Preseason Cup.

Rike also played a part in the Philippines–Australia brawl, as he protected Australian player Chris Goulding from further attacks. For his actions, he was awarded a cash incentive, but he gave it to charity.

In 2019, he represented the Philippines in the Jakarta 3x3 International Invitational Challenge. The next year, he was a member of the team that competed in the 2020 Fiba 3x3 World Tour Doha Masters.

== Personal life ==
Rike's mother, Veronica Verzosa, used to play collegiate tennis for the University of San Francisco. He also has a younger brother and sister. He is a nephew of former senator Antonio Trillanes.

Since leaving the PBA, Rike has become a content creator posting sports card content, and is dating Lily Hurtubise, a cheerleader for the Golden State Warriors.
