= Chooks-to-Go Pilipinas 3x3 =

3-on-3 basketball league in the Philippines

- Sport: Basketball
- Founded: December 2018; 7 years ago
- Founder: Ronald Mascariñas
- First season: 2019
- Folded: 2023
- Countries: Philippines
- Continent: FIBA Asia (Asia)
- Last champions: Quest 3.0; Quezon City Wilcon (1st title)
- Most titles: Cebu; Manila HeiHei; Quezon City; Pasig; Basilan; Balanga; Zamboanga City (1 title each)
- Broadcaster: FIBA 3X3 (YouTube)

Chooks-to-Go Pilipinas 3x3 was a professional 3-on-3 basketball league in the Philippines and was organized by the country's national basketball federation, the Samahang Basketbol ng Pilipinas (SBP). It was formed in 2018 as a bid to get the Philippines to qualify for the 3x3 basketball event in the Summer Olympics.

== History ==
In December 2018, Bounty Agro Ventures the company behind the roast chicken brand Chooks-to-Go, announced that it would be helping establish a 3-on-3 basketball league to be organized by the Samahang Basketbol ng Pilipinas. This followed the inclusion of the 3x3 variant of basketball being included as a medal event in the 2020 Summer Olympics in Tokyo. The organization of a 3x3 league would enable the Philippines to participate in FIBA 3x3 World Tour to accumulate points to qualify for the 3x3 event in the Olympics.

Eric Altamirano was named as the league's first commissioner. The pre-season game was set to commence on January 14, 2019, at the Ynares Sports Arena in Pasig, Metro Manila and the President's Cup, the first conference of the inaugural season was held which consisted of six legs, including a grand final leg.

In March 2019, it was reported that FIBA gave the Chooks-to-Go Pilipinas 3x3 recognition as a Quest level competition which meant that the winner of the President's Cup automatically qualifies for the FIBA 3x3 World Tour. Two more competitions were held for the 2019 season, the Patriot's Cup and the Magiting Cup.

The league attained professional status in July 2020, when it received approval from the Games and Amusement Board. The 2020 season was planned to have three competitions like the previous season but only the President's Cup was held due to the COVID-19 pandemic.

The third season was held in October 2021 with a one-day invitational tournament featuring 12 teams. The tournament was won by Manila HeiHei.

The league was effectively dissolved when Chooks-to-Go ended its 3x3 program in November 2023.

== Teams ==
Team
AMACOR Mandaluyong
ARQ Builders Cebu
Adam Esli Pasay
BRT Sumisip Basilan
Bacolod Pacquiao Coffee
Bocaue Homegrown Grains
Bacoor Strikers
Botolan Th3rd Floor
Bulacan Kuyas
Butuan Chooks
Cebu Chooks
Gold's Gym-Pasig Kings
Pasay Voyagers
Manila Chooks
Makati × MNL Kingpin
Moscow Inanomo (Russia)
Quezon City-Zark's Jawbreakers
San Juan-Go for Gold Knights
SWU-Cebu Cobras
Valenzuela Classic
Vethealth Delhi 3BL (India)
Tycoon Ballers QC
Cebu Max4-Birada
Marikina Shoemasters
J&J Makati
Wilkins Balanga
J&J Muntinlupa
Phenom/CTC Construction-Basilan Steel
CROSSOVR Magma Bicol
Fyr Fyter Bacolod
Equalivet Pasig
Adobo Connection-Gulf Supreme Boosters Bulacan
Vigan HUP (Vigan Wolves)
Thunder-Gold's Gym Taguig
Partas Narvacan
Equalivet Pateros
Mindoro Tamaraws 7A
Bacolod Master Sardines
Bicol Paxful SMDC
Butuan City Uling Roasters
Family's Brand Sardines-Zamboanga City
Nueva Ecija Rice Vanguards
Pagadian City Rocky Sports
Palayan City Capitals
Pasig Sta. Lucia Realtors
Pasig Kingpins
Pasig Banh Mi Kitchen
Paranaque Swish App
Petra Cement-Roxas City ZN Rockies
Porac-Big Boss Cement MSC Green Gorillas
Quezon City Wilcon
Sarangani Marlins
Essen Immunoboost Sarangani
MNL Kingpin Quezon City
RBR Cabiao Nueva Ecija
General Santos
Taguig Happy Hotels
Talisay EGS
Zamboanga Valientes MLV

== Summary ==
| Season | President's Cup | | | Patriot's Cup | | | Magiting Cup | | |
| Season | Champion | Grand Final | Runner-up | Champion | Grand Final | Runner-up | Champion | Grand Final | Runner-up |
|---|---|---|---|---|---|---|---|---|---|
| 2019 | Pasig Grindhouse Kings | 14–12 | 1Bataan Risers | Phenom Basilan CTC Construction | 21–20 | Wilkins Balanga Pure | Wilkins Balanga Pure | 21–19 | Equalivet Pasig |
| 2020–21 | Family's Brand Sardines-Zamboanga City | 22–19 | Nueva Ecija Rice Vanguards | Not held | | | | | |
| 2021 | Only Invitational Tournament Held (Final: Manila HeiHei 21–6 Pasig Kingpins) | | | | | | | | |
| 2022 | Only Chooks-to-Go Pilipinas 3x3 Quest 2.0 Held (Final: Cebu Chooks 20–18 Manila Chooks) | | | | | | | | |
| 2023 | Only Chooks-to-Go Pilipinas 3x3 Quest 3.0 Held (Final: Quezon City Wilcon 19–15 Pasig Banh Mi Kitchen) | | | | | | | | |

== Organization ==
=== Player eligibility ===
For the President's Cup, only Filipino players are eligible to play but Filipinos with foreign heritage are also eligible provided they can prove their lineage. The league adopts the laxer FIBA 3x3 player eligibility meaning that heritage players don't need to have acquired a Philippine passport by age 16, an eligibility requirement for the full 5-a-side basketball. Teams can name up to six players per conference but can only field four players per leg or tournament in a conference. The players need not to be a native of the team's home locality. For the Patriot's Cup each team can field one foreign player.

== Broadcasting ==
Matches of the league in the inaugural season were broadcast by ESPN5. For the 2020–21 season, BEAM TV will broadcast the entirety of the upcoming Chooks-to-Go Pilipinas 3x3 President's Cup.

== See also ==
- FIBA 3x3 World Tour
- SBP Pambansang Tatluhan
- Philippine Basketball Association
