= List of 2025–26 PBA season transactions =

This is a list of transactions that have taken place during the off-season and the 2025–26 PBA season.

== Retirement ==
Date	Name	Team(s) played (years)	Age	Notes	Ref.
2025
July 28 (Note: This was the date Tenorio was named head coach. He formally made a retirement announcement on September 6.)	LA Tenorio	San Miguel Beermen/Magnolia Beverage Masters (2006–2008); Alaska Aces (2008–2012); Barangay Ginebra San Miguel (2012–2025)	41	Formal retirement after being named the head coach for the Magnolia Chicken Timplados Hotshots. Also served as playing assistant coach for Barangay Ginebra. On December 20, 2025, Tenorio was activated as a playing coach.	
September 15	Sean Anthony (Note: Last played in 2024.)	Powerade Tigers (2010–2012); Barako Bull Energy Cola (2012–2013); Talk 'N Text Tropang Texters (2013–2014); Air21 Express (2014); Meralco Bolts (2014–2015); NLEX Road Warriors (2015–2017); GlobalPort/NorthPort Batang Pier (2017–2021); Phoenix Super LPG Fuel Masters (2022); NLEX Road Warriors (2023–2024)	39		
September 17	Chris Exciminiano	Alaska Aces (2013–2019); Rain or Shine Elasto Painters (2019); TNT Tropang Giga/5G (2021, 2024–2025)	36		
September 17	Ryan Reyes	Sta. Lucia Realtors (2007–2010); Talk 'N Text Tropang Texters/TNT Tropang Texters/Tropang TNT/TNT KaTropa/TNT Tropang Giga (2010–2024)	42		
October 3	JVee Casio	Powerade Tigers (2011–2012); Alaska Aces (2012–2021); Blackwater Bossing (2021–2025)	39	On February 27, 2026, Casio came out of retirement, signing with the Basilan Steel of the MPBL.	
December 29	Gabe Norwood	Rain or Shine Elasto Painters (2008–2025)	40	On October 9, 2025, Norwood announced that he would retire after the 2025–26 PBA Philippine Cup. Also served as assistant coach for the team. On April 10, 2026, the Rain or Shine Elasto Painters retired the jersey number of Norwood (#5) during their game against the Converge FiberXers.	
2026
January 17	Jared Dillinger (Note: Last played in 2023.)	Talk 'N Text Tropang Texters (2008–2013); Meralco Bolts (2013–2019); Barangay Ginebra San Miguel (2019–2023)	41		

== Coaching changes ==
=== Off-season ===
Departure date	Team	Outgoing head coach	Reason for departure	Hire date	Incoming head coach	Last coaching position	Ref.
July 28, 2025	Magnolia Chicken Timplados Hotshots	Chito Victolero	Replaced	July 28	LA Tenorio	Barangay Ginebra San Miguel playing assistant coach (2023, 2025)	
August 15	Phoenix Fuel Masters	Jamike Jarin	Demoted to team consultant	August 15	Willy Wilson	Phoenix Fuel Masters assistant coach (2020–2025)	
August 29	Terrafirma Dyip	Raymond Tiongco (interim)	Replaced	August 29	Ronald Tubid	Terrafirma Dyip assistant coach (2024–25)	
September 5	Converge FiberXers	Franco Atienza (interim)	Demoted to assistant coach	September 6	Dennis Pineda	Converge FiberXers assistant coach (2024–25)	
September 20	NorthPort Batang Pier	Bonnie Tan	Replaced	September 20	Johnedel Cardel	Terrafirma Dyip head coach (2018–2024)	

=== In-season ===
Departure date	Team	Outgoing head coach	Reason for departure	Hire date	Incoming head coach	Last coaching position	Ref.
January 14, 2026	Phoenix Fuel Masters	Willy Wilson	Released	January 20, 2026	Charles Tiu	Benilde Blazers head coach (2022–2025)	
January 30, 2026	Titan Ultra Giant Risers	Johnedel Cardel	Released	February 26, 2026	Rensy Bajar	Titan Ultra Giant Risers assistant coach (2025)	
March 25, 2026	Macau Black Knights (guest team)	Garrett Kelly	Released	March 25, 2026	Marcus Elliott		
April 11, 2026	Blackwater Bossing	Jeffrey Cariaso	Mutually agreed to part ways	April 11, 2026	Patrick Aquino (interim)	Blackwater Bossing assistant coach (2014–2019, 2022–2026)	
June 29, 2026	NLEX Road Warriors	Jong Uichico	Contract expired	June 29, 2026	Jimmy Alapag	Sacramento Kings player development coach (2023–2026)	
October 11, 2026	Titan Ultra Giant Risers	Rensy Bajar	Replaced	October 11, 2026	Raymond Valenzona (interim)	Titan Ultra Giant Risers assistant coach (2025–2026)	

== Player movements ==
=== Trades ===
August 2025
August 22	To Magnolia Chicken Timplados Hotshots: Javi Gómez de Liaño	To Terrafirma Dyip: Jerrick Ahanmisi; 2025 (S50) Magnolia second-round pick (No. 18)
September 2025
September 4	Three-team trade	
September 4	To Converge FiberXers: Larry Muyang (from Phoenix)	To NorthPort Batang Pier: Jeo Ambohot (from Converge)
September 4	To Phoenix Fuel Masters: Evan Nelle (from NorthPort)	
September 5	To Converge FiberXers: 2025 (S50) Phoenix first-round pick (No. 2); 2027 (S51) Phoenix second-round pick	To Phoenix Fuel Masters: Bryan Santos; 2025 (S50) Converge first-round pick (No. 8)
October 2025
October 1	To Phoenix Fuel Masters: James Kwekuteye	To Titan Ultra Giant Risers: Ato Ular
October 2	To Converge FiberXers: Rights of Mark Omega	To Rain or Shine Elasto Painters: 2028 (S52) Converge second-round pick
October 15	To Barangay Ginebra San Miguel: 2027 (S51) Terrafirma first-round pick	To Terrafirma Dyip: Maverick Ahanmisi; Aljon Mariano
October 24	To Converge FiberXers: Rights of Dave Ildefonso	To Titan Ultra Giant Risers: Kobe Monje; 2027 (S51) Converge second-round pick; 2028 (S52) Converge first-round pick
October 28	To Magnolia Chicken Timplados Hotshots: Chris Koon	To Titan Ultra Giant Risers: Aris Dionisio
December 2025
December 10	To Magnolia Chicken Timplados Hotshots: 2028 (S52) Terrafirma second-round pick	To Terrafirma Dyip: Joseph Eriobu
December 10	To Converge FiberXers: 2027 (S51) Titan Ultra second-round pick (from Titan Ultra via San Miguel) (Note: This is Titan's natural position asset, originally sent to SMB in the 2022 Von Pessumal deal, returned to NorthPort/Titan in the Dec 2023 Bolick blockbuster trade, and sent to Converge here. Also confirmed by team manager Aldriane Anglim in media reports noting Titan traded their own pick to Converge during the Javillonar acquisition.)	To Titan Ultra Giant Risers: Paolo Javillonar
February 2026
February 3	To Converge FiberXers: Calvin Abueva	To Titan Ultra Giant Risers: King Caralipio; Mark Omega; Rey Suerte
February 24	Three-team trade	
February 24	To Converge FiberXers: Jonnel Policarpio (from NLEX); Kurt Reyson (from Meralco); 2028 (S52) Meralco second-round pick	To Meralco Bolts: Javee Mocon (from NLEX)
February 24	To NLEX Road Warriors: Kevin Racal (from Converge); Schonny Winston (from Converge)	
February 24	To Converge FiberXers: James Kwekuteye	To Phoenix Super LPG Fuel Masters: Rights of Tony Ynot
February 27	To Barangay Ginebra San Miguel: Kemark Cariño	To Terrafirma Dyip: Ben Adamos
June 2026
June 3	To San Miguel Beermen: Jerrick Ahanmisi; Paolo Hernandez	To Terrafirma Dyip: Chris Miller; Juami Tiongson; 2028 (S52) San Miguel second-round pick
June 16	To Magnolia Chicken Timplados Hotshots: Rights of Arvin Tolentino; 2027 (S51) Titan Ultra second-round pick (from Magnolia) (Note: Magnolia regained its own pick that they formerly traded.)	To Titan Ultra Giant Risers: Rights of William Navarro; 2028 (S52) Magnolia second-round pick
July 2026
July 6	To NLEX Road Warriors: Evan Nelle	To Phoenix Super LPG Fuel Masters: Sidney Onwubere
July 16	To Phoenix Super LPG Fuel Masters: Gian Mamuyac; 2029 (S53) Rain or Shine second-round pick	To Rain or Shine Elasto Painters: 2029 (S53) Phoenix Super LPG first-round pick

=== Free agents ===
Player	Date signed	Contract amount	Contract length	New team	Former team	Ref.
2025
Stanley Pringle	July 15	Not disclosed	2 years	Rain or Shine Elasto Painters	Terrafirma Dyip	
Paul Zamar	July 30	Not disclosed	Not disclosed	Blackwater Bossing	NorthPort Batang Pier	
Brandon Ganuelas-Rosser	August 1	Not disclosed	2 years	TNT Tropang 5G		
Isaac Go	August 2	Not disclosed	1 year	Barangay Ginebra San Miguel		
Richard Escoto	August 2	Not disclosed	2 years	Blackwater Bossing		
Troy Mallillin	August 2	Not disclosed	2 years	Blackwater Bossing		
Robbie Herndon	August 4	Not disclosed	1 year	NLEX Road Warriors		
Francis Escandor	August 5	Not disclosed	2 years	Phoenix Fuel Masters	Rain or Shine Elasto Painters	
Peter Alfaro	August 12	Not disclosed	3 years	Magnolia Chicken Timplados Hotshots		
Raymond Almazan	August 13	Not disclosed	2 years	Meralco Bolts		
Joseph Eriobu	August 14	Not disclosed	1 year	Magnolia Chicken Timplados Hotshots		
Russel Escoto	August 14	Not disclosed	2 years	Magnolia Chicken Timplados Hotshots		
Paolo Taha	August 15	Not disclosed	2 years	Magnolia Chicken Timplados Hotshots	NorthPort Batang Pier	
Jeo Ambohot	August 27	Not disclosed	1 year	Converge FiberXers		
Bryan Santos	August 27	Not disclosed	2 years	Converge FiberXers		
Schonny Winston	August 27	₱420,000 per month (max. contract)	2 years	Converge FiberXers		
Richie Rodger	August 27	Not disclosed	1 year	NLEX Road Warriors		
Javi Gómez de Liaño	August 30	Not disclosed	3 years	Magnolia Chicken Timplados Hotshots	Anyang Jung Kwan Jang Red Boosters (KBL)	
Chris Newsome	September 5	Not disclosed	3 years	Meralco Bolts		
Norbert Torres	September 6	Not disclosed	Not disclosed	Barangay Ginebra San Miguel	Meralco Bolts	
Kevin Ferrer	September 7	Not disclosed	1 year	TNT Tropang 5G	Terrafirma Dyip	
Mike Nieto	September 7	Not disclosed	1 year	TNT Tropang 5G		
David Murrell	September 9	Not disclosed	1 year	Blackwater Bossing	Barangay Ginebra San Miguel	
Ricci Rivero	September 11	Not disclosed	Not disclosed	Phoenix Fuel Masters		
Christian David	September 12	Not disclosed	2 years	Blackwater Bossing		
Zavier Lucero	September 13	₱420,000 per month (max. contract)	2 years	Magnolia Chicken Timplados Hotshots		
Damie Cuntapay	September 17	Not disclosed	1 year	NorthPort Batang Pier		
Fran Yu	September 17	Not disclosed	1 year	NorthPort Batang Pier		
Kemark Cariño	September 18	Not disclosed	Not disclosed	Terrafirma Dyip		
Brent Paraiso	September 18	Not disclosed	Not disclosed	Terrafirma Dyip		
Paul Garcia	September 18	Not disclosed	Not disclosed	Terrafirma Dyip	Barangay Ginebra San Miguel	
Prince Rivero	September 18	Not disclosed	Not disclosed	Terrafirma Dyip	Rain or Shine Elasto Painters	
Cade Flores	September 18	Not disclosed	2 years	NorthPort Batang Pier		
Von Pessumal	September 18	Not disclosed	1 year	NorthPort Batang Pier	Barangay Ginebra San Miguel	
RR Garcia	September 19	Not disclosed	1 year	Phoenix Fuel Masters		
RJ Jazul	September 19	Not disclosed	1 year	Phoenix Fuel Masters		
Prince Caperal	September 19	Not disclosed	Not disclosed	Phoenix Fuel Masters	Blackwater Bossing	
Yousef Taha	September 19	Not disclosed	Not disclosed	Phoenix Fuel Masters	Abra Solid North Weavers (MPBL)	
Aljun Melecio	September 20	Not disclosed	1 year	NorthPort Batang Pier	Terrafirma Dyip	
Jed Mendoza	September 20	Not disclosed	1 year	Blackwater Bossing	Magnolia Chicken Timplados Hotshots	
Tyrus Hill	September 22	Not disclosed	1 year	TNT Tropang 5G	Blackwater Bossing	
Didat Hanapi	September 24	Not disclosed	1 year	Terrafirma Dyip		
Paolo Hernandez	September 24	Not disclosed	1 year	Terrafirma Dyip		
Keith Zaldivar	September 24	Not disclosed	1 year	Terrafirma Dyip		
Henry Galinato	September 24	Not disclosed	2 years	TNT Tropang 5G		
Rafi Reavis	September 27	Not disclosed	Not disclosed	Converge FiberXers	Magnolia Chicken Timplados Hotshots	
Jayson David	September 29	Not disclosed	2 years	Barangay Ginebra San Miguel		
James Martinez	October 1	Not disclosed	Not disclosed	Titan Ultra Giant Risers	Ho Chi Minh City Wings (VBA)	
Raffy Verano	October 2	Not disclosed	Not disclosed	Magnolia Chicken Timplados Hotshots	Phoenix Fuel Masters	
Jerrick Ahanmisi	October 2	Not disclosed	1 year	Terrafirma Dyip		
Arvie Bringas	October 4	Not disclosed	Not disclosed	Titan Ultra Giant Risers	Val City Magic (MPBL)	
Roi Sumang	October 4	Not disclosed	Not disclosed	Titan Ultra Giant Risers	Zamboanga Sikat (MPBL)	
Jio Jalalon	October 4	Not disclosed	1 year	TNT Tropang 5G	NorthPort Batang Pier	
Almond Vosotros	October 4	Not disclosed	1 conference	TNT Tropang 5G		
Stephen Holt	October 4	Not disclosed	3 years	Barangay Ginebra San Miguel		
JR Raflores	October 14	Not disclosed	Not disclosed	Converge FiberXers	Muntinlupa Cagers (MPBL)	
John Lloyd Clemente	October 21	Not disclosed	Not disclosed	Converge FiberXers	Pampanga Giant Lanterns (MPBL)	
Archie Concepcion	October 21	Not disclosed	Not disclosed	Converge FiberXers	Pampanga Giant Lanterns (MPBL)	
Larry Muyang	October 21	Not disclosed	Not disclosed	Converge FiberXers	Pampanga Giant Lanterns (MPBL)	
Jhaymo Eguilos	October 25	Not disclosed	Not disclosed	Converge FiberXers	Pampanga Giant Lanterns (MPBL)	
Sidney Onwubere	November 14	Not disclosed	2 conferences	NLEX Road Warriors	NorthPort Batang Pier	
Dominick Fajardo	December 3	Not disclosed	2 years	NLEX Road Warriors		
Anthony Semerad	December 3	Not disclosed	2 years	NLEX Road Warriors		
Vic Manuel	December 15	Not disclosed	Not disclosed	Converge FiberXers	Pangasinan Heatwaves (MPBL)	
2026
Beau Belga	January 19	Not disclosed	1 year	Rain or Shine Elasto Painters		
JC Cullar	February 7	Not disclosed	Not disclosed	Phoenix Super LPG Fuel Masters	San Juan Knights (MPBL)	
Andreas Cahilig	February 23	Not disclosed	2 years	San Miguel Beermen		
Mikey Williams	March 4	Not disclosed	1 year	Converge FiberXers	TNT Tropang Giga	
Justin Chua	March 19	Not disclosed	Not disclosed	TNT Tropang 5G	Blackwater Bossing	
Avan Nava	March 27	Not disclosed	Not disclosed	TNT Tropang 5G	NorthPort Batang Pier	
Jaydee Tungcab	March 31	Not disclosed	Not disclosed	Converge FiberXers	Blackwater Bossing	
CJ Austria	April 21	Not disclosed	1 year	Blackwater Bossing	Titan Ultra Giant Risers (Note: CJ Austria signed a rookie contract with Titan Ultra last February 18, 2026 but he did not play any single game with the team because he was released by the team.)	
Michael DiGregorio	May 8	Not disclosed	Not disclosed	Blackwater Bossing	Pangasinan Heatwaves (MPBL)	
JM Calma	June 14	Not disclosed	2 years	San Miguel Beermen		
Ato Ular	June 18	Not disclosed	2 years	Titan Ultra Giant Risers		
Jun Roque	June 23	Not disclosed	1 year	Rain or Shine Elasto Painters		
Anton Asistio	June 23	Not disclosed	1 year	Rain or Shine Elasto Painters		
Jhonard Clarito	June 26	Not disclosed	3 years	Rain or Shine Elasto Painters		
Justin Chua	June 27	Not disclosed	Rest of the season	Phoenix Super LPG Fuel Masters	TNT Tropang 5G	
Nick Demusis	June 29	Not disclosed	Rest of the season	Blackwater Bossing	Nueva Ecija Rice Vanguards (MPBL)	
Clifford Jopia	June 30	Not disclosed	1 year	Magnolia Chicken Timplados Hotshots	Blackwater Bossing	
James Sena	July 5	Not disclosed	Rest of the season	Blackwater Bossing	Iloilo United Royals (MPBL)	
John Amores	July 8	Not disclosed	Rest of the season	Titan Ultra Giant Risers	NorthPort Batang Pier	
Tyler Tio	July 9	Not disclosed	3 years	Phoenix Super LPG Fuel Masters		
Rafi Reavis	July 9	Not disclosed	Rest of the season	Phoenix Super LPG Fuel Masters	Converge FiberXers (Note: Rafi Reavis was signed last September 27, 2025 by Converge but he did not play any single game with the team.)	
Robert Bolick	August 26	Not disclosed	3 years	NLEX Road Warriors		
RR Garcia	September 8	Not disclosed	Rest of the season	Titan Ultra Giant Risers	Phoenix Fuel Masters	
Jerrick Ahanmisi	September 23	Not disclosed	3 years	San Miguel Beermen		
Luis Villegas	September 28	Not disclosed	2 years	Rain or Shine Elasto Painters		
Jeo Ambohot	September 29	Not disclosed	Rest of the season	TNT Tropang 5G	Titan Ultra Giant Risers	
Caelan Tiongson	October 5	Not disclosed	2 years	Rain or Shine Elasto Painters		
Joshua Munzon	October 11	Not disclosed	3 years	Titan Ultra Giant Risers		
Jordan Heading	October 13	Not disclosed	3 years	TNT Tropang 5G		
Deo Cuajao	October 14	Not disclosed	2 years	Rain or Shine Elasto Painters		

=== Going to other Philippine leagues ===
Player	Date signed	New team	New league	Former PBA team	Ref.
2025
Aldrech Ramos	June 17	San Juan Knights	MPBL	Terrafirma Dyip	
Agem Miranda	June 19	Ilagan Isabela Cowboys	MPBL	NorthPort Batang Pier	
Mike Ayonayon	June 21	Abra Solid North Weavers	MPBL	Blackwater Bossing	
Simon Camacho	June 21	Abra Solid North Weavers	MPBL	Phoenix Fuel Masters	
JC Cullar	June 25	San Juan Knights	MPBL	Phoenix Fuel Masters	
Miguel Corteza	June 30	Muntinlupa Cagers	MPBL	Blackwater Bossing	
Jolo Mendoza	July 1	Abra Solid North Weavers	MPBL	Meralco Bolts	
Jhan Nermal	July 2	Pampanga Giant Lanterns	MPBL	Converge FiberXers	
Allyn Bulanadi	July 27	Pangasinan Heatwaves	MPBL	NorthPort Batang Pier	
Raul Soyud	September 13	San Juan Knights	MPBL	Phoenix Fuel Masters	
2026
JVee Casio	February 27	Basilan Steel	MPBL	Blackwater Bossing	
Shaun Ildefonso	April 10	Abra Weavers	MPBL	Rain or Shine Elasto Painters	

=== Going overseas ===
Player	Date signed	New team	New country	Former PBA team	Ref.
2025
Jamie Malonzo	July 31	Kyoto Hannaryz	Japan	Barangay Ginebra San Miguel	
William Navarro	August 5	Busan KCC Egis	South Korea	Magnolia Chicken Timplados Hotshots	
2026
BJ Andrade	June 29	Winling	Hong Kong	Blackwater Bossing	

== 2025 PBA draft ==
The PBA season 50 draft was held on September 7, 2025, at SM Mall of Asia Music Hall in Pasay. A total of 77 amateur players were selected in 11 rounds of draft.

Round	Pick	Player	Date signed	Contract length	Team (Note: Team denotes the team that holds the players' draft rights at the time of contract signing. Teams in parentheses denotes the teams that drafted the players before any trade or free agent signing occurred)	Ref.
1	1	Geo Chiu	Not disclosed	3 years	Terrafirma Dyip	
1	2	Juan Gómez de Liaño	September 13, 2025	3 years	Converge FiberXers	
1	3	Dalph Panopio	September 12, 2025	3 years	Blackwater Bossing	
1	4	Chris Koon	October 6, 2025	2 years	Titan Ultra Giant Risers	
1	5	Ljay Gonzales	December 23, 2025	Not disclosed	NLEX Road Warriors	
1	6	Yukien Andrada	December 20, 2025	Not disclosed	Magnolia Chicken Timplados Hotshots	
1	7	Jason Brickman	January 31, 2026	1 year	Meralco Bolts	
1	8	Will Gozum	February 7, 2026	2 years	Phoenix Fuel Masters	
1	9	Chris Miller	September 16, 2025	2 years	San Miguel Beermen	
1	10	Christian Manaytay	November 11, 2025	2 years	Rain or Shine Elasto Painters	
1	11	Sonny Estil	September 29, 2025	1 year	Barangay Ginebra San Miguel	
1	12	Jun Roque	January 28, 2026	1 year	Rain or Shine Elasto Painters	
2	13	Mario Barasi	September 23, 2025	Not disclosed	NorthPort Batang Pier (drafted by Barangay Ginebra but left unsigned)	
2	14	Dave Ando	September 19, 2025	Not disclosed	Phoenix Fuel Masters	
2	15	Ximone Sandagon	December 22, 2025	1 year	Blackwater Bossing	
2	16	CJ Austria	February 18, 2026	1 year	Titan Ultra Giant Risers	
2	17	Arvin Gamboa	Not disclosed	Not disclosed	NLEX Road Warriors	
2	18	Shawn Umali	Not disclosed	Not disclosed	Terrafirma Dyip	
2	19	Vince Magbuhos	January 21, 2026	2 years	Meralco Bolts	
2	20	Mark Omega	December 23, 2025	Not disclosed	Converge FiberXers	
2	21	Kobe Monje	September 27, 2025	Not disclosed	Converge FiberXers	
2	22	Deo Cuajao	January 28, 2026	1 year	Rain or Shine Elasto Painters	
2	23	John Abis	December 20, 2025	Not disclosed	Barangay Ginebra San Miguel	
2	24	Joshua David	January 28, 2026	1 year	Rain or Shine Elasto Painters	
3	27	Jack Cruz-Dumont	September 18, 2025	1 year	Blackwater Bossing	
3	29	Lorenz Capulong	October 21, 2025	Not disclosed	NLEX Road Warriors	
3	30	Gab Gomez	September 23, 2025	Not disclosed	Magnolia Chicken Timplados Hotshots	
3	32	Tony Ynot	April 16, 2026	Not disclosed	Phoenix Super LPG Fuel Masters	
3	33	Royce Mantua	September 24, 2025	1 year	San Miguel Beermen	
4	38	James Una	November 3, 2025	2 years	Blackwater Bossing	
4	39	Bryan Sajonia	December 19, 2025	1 year	Titan Ultra Giant Risers	
4	42	Ladis Lepalam	Not disclosed	Not disclosed	Meralco Bolts	
4	46	Joe Celzo	Not disclosed	Not disclosed	TNT Tropang 5G	
5	52	Jeff Comia	Not disclosed	Not disclosed	Meralco Bolts	
5	54	Axel Iñigo	June 26, 2026	Not disclosed	Titan Ultra Giant Risers (drafted by San Miguel but left unsigned)	
6	56	JM Bravo	September 24, 2025	Not disclosed	Terrafirma Dyip	
7	62	Ira Bataller	September 18, 2025	Not disclosed	Terrafirma Dyip	
