= 2024–25 Magnolia Chicken Timplados Hotshots season =

- Head coach: Chito Victolero
- General manager: Alvin Patrimonio
- Owners: San Miguel Pure Foods Company, Inc. (a San Miguel Corporation subsidiary)

Governors' Cup results
- Record: 5–5 (50%)
- Place: 4th in group A
- Playoff finish: Quarterfinalist (lost to Rain or Shine, 2–3)

Commissioner's Cup results
- Record: 6–6 (50%)
- Place: 8th
- Playoff finish: Quarterfinalist (lost to NorthPort with twice-to-win disadvantage)

Philippine Cup results
- Record: 8–3 (72.7%)
- Place: 3rd
- Playoff finish: Quarterfinalist (lost to TNT with twice-to-beat advantage)

Magnolia Chicken Timplados Hotshots seasons

The 2024–25 Magnolia Chicken Timplados Hotshots season was the 36th season of the franchise in the Philippine Basketball Association (PBA).

== Key dates ==
- July 14: The PBA season 49 draft was held at the Glorietta Activity Center in Makati.

== Draft picks ==
Round	Pick	Player	Position	Place of birth	College
1	9	Jerom Lastimosa	G	Philippines	Adamson
3	33	RV Berjay	F	Philippines	Ateneo
4	42	Ry dela Rosa	G	USA	JRU

== Roster ==
2024–25 Magnolia Chicken Timplados Hotshots roster
Players
Coaches

Pos.	#	POB	Name	Height	Weight	DOB (YYYY–MM–DD)	From
G	2	(United States)	Jerrick Ahanmisi	6 ft 1 in (1.85 m)	185 lb (84 kg)	1997–10–16	Adamson
G	3	(Philippines)	Paul Lee	6 ft 0 in (1.83 m)	200 lb (91 kg)	1989–02–14	UE
C	4	(United States)	Rafi Reavis (C)	6 ft 8 in (2.03 m)	210 lb (95 kg)	1977–07–26	Coppin State
F/C	6	(Greece)	William Navarro	6 ft 6 in (1.98 m)	185 lb (84 kg)	1997–02–03	Ateneo
C	10	(Philippines)	Ian Sangalang	6 ft 7 in (2.01 m)	212 lb (96 kg)	1991–12–20	San Sebastian
G	14	(Philippines)	Mark Barroca	5 ft 10 in (1.78 m)	170 lb (77 kg)	1986–04–25	Far Eastern
G	17	(Philippines)	Peter Alfaro (R)	5 ft 11 in (1.80 m)		1998–12–17	San Beda
F	19	(United States)	Rome dela Rosa	6 ft 3 in (1.91 m)	185 lb (84 kg)	1990–12–11	San Beda
F	22	(United States)	Zavier Lucero	6 ft 6 in (1.98 m)	205 lb (93 kg)	1999–04–05	Philippines
F	23	(British Hong Kong)	Joseph Eriobu	6 ft 4 in (1.93 m)	198 lb (90 kg)	1992–02–12	Mapúa
G	30	(Philippines)	Jerom Lastimosa (R)	5 ft 11 in (1.80 m)		1998–07–01	Adamson
C	42	(Australia)	James Laput	6 ft 10 in (2.08 m)	245 lb (111 kg)	1996–08–26	De La Salle
F	57	(Philippines)	Aris Dionisio	6 ft 4 in (1.93 m)		1995–07–21	St. Clare
G	65	(Philippines)	Jed Mendoza	5 ft 10 in (1.78 m)	160 lb (73 kg)	1996–06–21	UE
F/C	88	(Philippines)	Russel Escoto	6 ft 6 in (1.98 m)	200 lb (91 kg)	1992–12–04	Far Eastern

Head coach

- (Philippines) Chito Victolero

Assistant coach(es)

- (Philippines) Jason Webb (1st assistant)
- (Philippines) Johnny Abarrientos
- (Philippines) Angelito Esguerra
- (Philippines) Tonyboy Espinosa
- (Philippines) Mon Jose
- (Philippines) Juno Sauler
- (Philippines) Paul Sorongon

Team manager

- (Philippines) Alvin Patrimonio

Legend

- (C) Team captain
- (CI) Commissioner's Cup Import
- (GI) Governors' Cup Import
- (EI) EASL Import
- (DP) Unsigned draft pick
- (FA) Free agent
- (IN) Inactive
- (S) Suspended
- (R) Rookie
- Injured

Roster

== Governors' Cup ==
=== Eliminations ===
==== Group A Standings ====
Pos	Team	W	L	PCT	GB	Qualification
1	TNT Tropang Giga	8	2	.800	—	Quarterfinals
2	Meralco Bolts	7	3	.700	1	Quarterfinals
3	Converge FiberXers	6	4	.600	2	Quarterfinals
4	Magnolia Chicken Timplados Hotshots	5	5	.500	3	Quarterfinals
5	NorthPort Batang Pier	3	7	.300	5	
6	Terrafirma Dyip	1	9	.100	7	

Source: PBA.ph
Rules for classification: 1) winning percentage; 2) if two teams are tied, head-to-head record, if three or more teams are tied, head-to-head goal average (quotient); 3) overall quotient; 4) coin toss

==== Game log ====
2024 PBA Governors' Cup game log
Total: 5–5
August: 1–2

Game	Date	Opponent	Score	High points	High rebounds	High assists	Location Attendance	Record
1	August 18	Meralco	L 94–99	Glenn Robinson III (29)	Glenn Robinson III (11)	Mark Barroca (8)	Smart Araneta Coliseum	0–1
2	August 23	Converge	W 105–93	Glenn Robinson III (28)	Ian Sangalang (8)	Paul Lee (7)	Smart Araneta Coliseum	1–1
3	August 29	TNT	L 82–88	Glenn Robinson III (19)	Glenn Robinson III (15)	Lee, Robinson III (3)	Ninoy Aquino Stadium	1–2

September: 4–3

Game	Date	Opponent	Score	High points	High rebounds	High assists	Location Attendance	Record
4	September 1	Terrafirma	W 124–103	Jerrick Ahanmisi (24)	Glenn Robinson III (13)	Paul Lee (9)	Ninoy Aquino Stadium	2–2
5	September 4	NorthPort	W 105–94	Glenn Robinson III (25)	Zavier Lucero (12)	Paul Lee (11)	Smart Araneta Coliseum	3–2
6	September 7	Meralco	L 74–82	Zavier Lucero (14)	Zavier Lucero (13)	Mark Barroca (5)	Panabo City Multi-Purpose Tourism Cultural and Sports Center	3–3
7	September 12	Terrafirma	W 99–98	Shabazz Muhammad (20)	Calvin Abueva (7)	Mark Barroca (9)	Ninoy Aquino Stadium	4–3
8	September 17	TNT	L 82–88	Shabazz Muhammad (30)	Shabazz Muhammad (17)	Mark Barroca (6)	Ninoy Aquino Stadium	4–4
9	September 20	NorthPort	W 110–94	Aris Dionisio (30)	Zavier Lucero (12)	Mark Barroca (12)	Ninoy Aquino Stadium	5–4
10	September 23	Converge	L 82–89	Abueva, Alfaro (11)	Rafi Reavis (9)	Abueva, Mendoza, Rice (3)	Ninoy Aquino Stadium	5–5

=== Playoffs ===
==== Bracket ====
Quarterfinals (Best-of-5)
A1	TNT	3
B4	NLEX	1
B1	Rain or Shine	3
A4	Magnolia	2
B2	San Miguel	3
A3	Converge	2
A2	Meralco	0
B3	Barangay Ginebra	3

Semifinals (Best-of-7)
A1	TNT	4
B1	Rain or Shine	1
B2	San Miguel	2
B3	Barangay Ginebra	4

Finals (Best-of-7)
A1	TNT	4
B3	Barangay Ginebra	2

==== Game log ====
2024 PBA Governors' Cup playoffs game log
Total: 2–3
Quarterfinals: 2–3

Game	Date	Opponent	Score	High points	High rebounds	High assists	Location Attendance	Series
1	September 25	Rain or Shine	L 105–109	Rayvonte Rice (16)	Paul Lee (9)	Paul Lee (13)	Ninoy Aquino Stadium	0–1
2	September 27	Rain or Shine	W 121–69	Jabari Bird (22)	Jabari Bird (13)	Mark Barroca (10)	Santa Rosa Sports Complex	1–1
3	September 29	Rain or Shine	L 106–111 (OT)	Jabari Bird (31)	Calvin Abueva (15)	Mark Barroca (6)	Ynares Center	1–2
4	October 1	Rain or Shine	W 129–100	Jabari Bird (30)	Jed Mendoza (7)	Barroca, Lee (6)	Ninoy Aquino Stadium	2–2
5	October 5	Rain or Shine	L 103–113	Jabari Bird (23)	Jabari Bird (15)	Paul Lee (7)	Ynares Center	2–3

== Commissioner's Cup ==
=== Eliminations ===
==== Standings ====
Pos	Team	W	L	PCT	GB	Qualification
1	NorthPort Batang Pier	9	3	.750	—	Twice-to-beat in the quarterfinals
2	TNT Tropang Giga	8	4	.667 (Note: Head-to-head quotient: TNT 1.04, Converge 1.03, Barangay Ginebra 0.94)	1	Twice-to-beat in the quarterfinals
3	Converge FiberXers	8	4	.667	1	Best-of-three quarterfinals
4	Barangay Ginebra San Miguel	8	4	.667	1	Best-of-three quarterfinals
5	Meralco Bolts	7	5	.583 (Note: Head-to-head quotient: Meralco 1.08, Rain or Shine 1.04, Eastern 0.88)	2	Best-of-three quarterfinals
6	Rain or Shine Elasto Painters	7	5	.583	2	Best-of-three quarterfinals
7	Eastern (G)	7	5	.583	2	Twice-to-win in the quarterfinals
8	Magnolia Chicken Timplados Hotshots	6	6	.500 (Note: Eighth seed playoff: Magnolia 112–81 NLEX)	3	Twice-to-win in the quarterfinals
9	NLEX Road Warriors	6	6	.500	3	
10	San Miguel Beermen	5	7	.417	4	
11	Blackwater Bossing	3	9	.250 (Note: Head-to-head record: Blackwater 1–0 Phoenix)	6	
12	Phoenix Fuel Masters	3	9	.250	6	
13	Terrafirma Dyip	1	11	.083	8	

Source: PBA.ph
Rules for classification: 1) winning percentage; 2) if two teams are tied, head-to-head record; if three or more teams are tied, head-to-head goal average (quotient); if tied for 8th, one-game playoff; 3) overall quotient; 4) coin toss
(G) Guests

==== Game log ====
2024–25 PBA Commissioner's Cup game log
Total: 6–6
November: 1–0

Game	Date	Opponent	Score	High points	High rebounds	High assists	Location Attendance	Record
1	November 28, 2024	Blackwater	W 118–100	Ricardo Ratliffe (30)	Ricardo Ratliffe (18)	Mark Barroca (8)	Ninoy Aquino Stadium	1–0

December: 1–5

Game	Date	Opponent	Score	High points	High rebounds	High assists	Location Attendance	Record
2	December 1, 2024	Converge	L 91–93	Ricardo Ratliffe (25)	Ricardo Ratliffe (19)	Rome dela Rosa (5)	Ynares Center	1–1
3	December 4, 2024	NorthPort	L 103–107	Jerom Lastimosa (27)	Ricardo Ratliffe (13)	Jerom Lastimosa (8)	Ninoy Aquino Stadium	1–2
4	December 11, 2024	TNT	L 100–103	Ricardo Ratliffe (27)	Ricardo Ratliffe (14)	Mark Barroca (8)	Ninoy Aquino Stadium	1–3
5	December 18, 2024	Rain or Shine	L 100–102	Ricardo Ratliffe (27)	Ricardo Ratliffe (13)	Barroca, Lee (4)	Ninoy Aquino Stadium	1–4
6	December 20, 2024	NLEX	W 99–95 (OT)	Ricardo Ratliffe (38)	Ricardo Ratliffe (19)	Mark Barroca (8)	PhilSports Arena	2–4
7	December 25, 2024	Barangay Ginebra	L 92–95	Ricardo Ratliffe (17)	Ricardo Ratliffe (16)	Barroca, Ratliffe (4)	Smart Araneta Coliseum; 12,198	2–5

January: 4–1

Game	Date	Opponent	Score	High points	High rebounds	High assists	Location Attendance	Record
8	January 10, 2025	Terrafirma	W 89–84	Ricardo Ratliffe (32)	Ricardo Ratliffe (14)	Mark Barroca (11)	Ninoy Aquino Stadium	3–5
9	January 12, 2025	San Miguel	L 78–85	Ricardo Ratliffe (24)	Ricardo Ratliffe (15)	Mark Barroca (6)	Ynares Center	3–6
10	January 16, 2025	Phoenix	W 110–104	Zavier Lucero (25)	Ricardo Ratliffe (19)	Alfaro, Barroca (4)	PhilSports Arena	4–6
11	January 26, 2025	Eastern	W 107–78	Ricardo Ratliffe (25)	Ricardo Ratliffe (16)	Ricardo Ratliffe (7)	Ynares Center	5–6
12	January 31, 2025	Meralco	W 129–92	Ricardo Ratliffe (31)	Ricardo Ratliffe (19)	Paul Lee (5)	PhilSports Arena	6–6

=== Playoffs ===
==== Bracket ====
Quarterfinals
(#1 twice-to-beat)
1	NorthPort	113
8	Magnolia	110
(Best-of-3)
4	Barangay Ginebra	2
5	Meralco	1
(#2 twice-to-beat)
2	TNT	109
7	Eastern	93
(Best-of-3)
3	Converge	1
6	Rain or Shine	2

Semifinals (Best-of-7)
1	NorthPort	1
4	Barangay Ginebra	4
2	TNT	4
6	Rain or Shine	1

Finals (Best-of-7)
4	Barangay Ginebra	3
2	TNT	4

==== Game log ====
2024–25 PBA Commissioner's Cup playoffs game log
Total: 1–1
8th seed playoff: 1–0

Game	Date	Opponent	Score	High points	High rebounds	High assists	Location Attendance	Series
1	February 2, 2025	NLEX	W 112–81	Ricardo Ratliffe (32)	Ricardo Ratliffe (14)	Mark Barroca (6)	Ynares Center	1–0

Quarterfinals: 0–1

Game	Date	Opponent	Score	High points	High rebounds	High assists	Location Attendance	Series
1	February 6, 2025	NorthPort	L 110–113	Mark Barroca (26)	Ricardo Ratliffe (19)	Mark Barroca (10)	Ninoy Aquino Stadium	0–1

== Philippine Cup ==
=== Eliminations ===
==== Standings ====
Pos	Team	W	L	PCT	GB	Qualification
1	San Miguel Beermen	8	3	.727 (Note: Head-to-head quotient: San Miguel 1.06, NLEX 1.01, Magnolia 0.97, Barangay Ginebra 0.96)	—	Twice-to-beat in the quarterfinals
2	NLEX Road Warriors	8	3	.727	—	Twice-to-beat in the quarterfinals
3	Magnolia Chicken Timplados Hotshots	8	3	.727	—	Twice-to-beat in the quarterfinals
4	Barangay Ginebra San Miguel	8	3	.727	—	Twice-to-beat in the quarterfinals
5	Converge FiberXers	7	4	.636	1	Twice-to-win in the quarterfinals
6	TNT Tropang 5G	6	5	.545 (Note: Head-to-head quotient: TNT 1.13, Rain or Shine 1.02, Meralco 0.87)	2	Twice-to-win in the quarterfinals
7	Rain or Shine Elasto Painters	6	5	.545	2	Twice-to-win in the quarterfinals
8	Meralco Bolts	6	5	.545	2	Twice-to-win in the quarterfinals
9	Phoenix Fuel Masters	4	7	.364	4	
10	Blackwater Bossing	2	9	.182 (Note: Head-to-head record: Blackwater 1–0 NorthPort)	6	
11	NorthPort Batang Pier	2	9	.182	6	
12	Terrafirma Dyip	1	10	.091	7	

Source: PBA.ph
Rules for classification: 1) winning percentage; 2) if two teams are tied, head-to-head record; if three or more teams are tied, head-to-head goal average (quotient); if tied for 8th, one-game playoff; 3) overall quotient; 4) coin toss

==== Game log ====
2025 PBA Philippine Cup game log
Total: 8–3
April: 4–0

Game	Date	Opponent	Score	High points	High rebounds	High assists	Location Attendance	Record
1	April 5	Blackwater	W 106–84	Zavier Lucero (21)	Ian Sangalang (10)	Paul Lee (7)	Ninoy Aquino Stadium	1–0
2	April 9	Converge	W 83–71	Lucero, Sangalang (18)	Ian Sangalang (9)	Mark Barroca (7)	Rizal Memorial Coliseum	2–0
3	April 16	San Miguel	W 98–95 (OT)	Zavier Lucero (24)	Calvin Abueva (11)	Mark Barroca (7)	Smart Araneta Coliseum	3–0
4	April 26	Phoenix	W 118–99	Ian Sangalang (20)	Zavier Lucero (11)	Barroca, dela Rosa (5)	Zamboanga City Coliseum	4–0

May: 3–1

Game	Date	Opponent	Score	High points	High rebounds	High assists	Location Attendance	Record
5	May 4	Terrafirma	W 127–94	Zavier Lucero (17)	Zavier Lucero (9)	Alfaro, Lastimosa (6)	Ynares Center	5–0
6	May 14	Meralco	W 117–92	Paul Lee (27)	Ian Sangalang (9)	Mark Barroca (10)	Ninoy Aquino Stadium	6–0
7	May 18	Rain or Shine	L 105–119	Zavier Lucero (17)	Calvin Abueva (7)	Mark Barroca (3)	Ynares Center II; 8,175	6–1
8	May 24	NorthPort	W 106–97	Zavier Lucero (20)	dela Rosa, Lucero (8)	Mark Barroca (7)	Candon City Arena	7–1

June: 1–2

Game	Date	Opponent	Score	High points	High rebounds	High assists	Location Attendance	Record
9	June 1	Barangay Ginebra	L 81–85	Lucero, Sangalang (16)	Ian Sangalang (12)	Paul Lee (6)	Smart Araneta Coliseum	7–2
10	June 6	NLEX	L 99–107	Zavier Lucero (23)	Zavier Lucero (12)	Mark Barroca (5)	Ninoy Aquino Stadium	7–3
11	June 13	TNT	W 88–83	Zavier Lucero (24)	Zavier Lucero (8)	Paul Lee (7)	Ninoy Aquino Stadium	8–3

=== Playoffs ===
==== Bracket ====
Quarterfinals (Top 4 twice-to-beat)
1	San Miguel	108
8	Meralco	97
4	Barangay Ginebra	88
5	Converge	80
2	NLEX	89	92
7	Rain or Shine	92	103
3	Magnolia	88	79
6	TNT	89	80

Semifinals (Best-of-7)
1	San Miguel	4
4	Barangay Ginebra	3
7	Rain or Shine	2
6	TNT	4

Finals (Best-of-7)
1	San Miguel	4
6	TNT	2

==== Game log ====
2025 PBA Philippine Cup playoffs game log
Total: 0–2
Quarterfinals: 0–2

Game	Date	Opponent	Score	High points	High rebounds	High assists	Location Attendance	Series
1	June 18	TNT	L 88–89	Paul Lee (15)	Mark Barroca (9)	Mark Barroca (11)	PhilSports Arena	0–1
2	June 21	TNT	L 79–80	Zavier Lucero (15)	Zavier Lucero (10)	Mark Barroca (7)	Ninoy Aquino Stadium	0–2

== Transactions ==
=== Free agency ===
==== Signings ====
Player	Date signed	Contract amount	Contract length	Former team	Ref.
Joseph Eriobu	August 2, 2024	Not disclosed	1 year	Re-signed	

==== Subtractions ====
Player	Number	Position	Reason	New team	Ref.
Jackson Corpuz	1	Power forward	Released	Converge FiberXers	

=== Trades ===
==== Pre-season ====
July
July 15, 2024	To Magnolia Zavier Lucero	To NorthPort Jio Jalalon; Abu Tratter

==== Philippine Cup ====
May
May 27, 2025	To Magnolia William Navarro	To NorthPort Calvin Abueva; Jerrick Balanza; 2026 Magnolia second-round pick

=== Recruited imports ===
Tournament	Name	Debuted	Last game	Record	Ref.
Governors' Cup	Glenn Robinson III	August 18, 2024 (vs. Meralco)	September 4, 2024 (vs. NorthPort)	3–2	
Governors' Cup	Shabazz Muhammad	September 12, 2024 (vs. Terrafirma)	September 17, 2024 (vs. TNT)	1–1	
Governors' Cup	Rayvonte Rice	September 23, 2024 (vs. Converge)	September 25, 2024 (vs. Rain or Shine)	0–2	
Governors' Cup	Jabari Bird	September 27, 2024 (vs. Rain or Shine)	October 5, 2024 (vs. Rain or Shine)	2–2	
Commissioner's Cup	Ricardo Ratliffe	November 28, 2024 (vs. Blackwater)	February 6, 2025 (vs. NorthPort)	7–7	

== Awards ==
Recipient	Award	Date awarded	Reference
Zavier Lucero	2024–25 PBA Defensive Player of the Year	October 13, 2025	
Recipient	Honors	Date awarded	Reference
Zavier Lucero	2024–25 PBA Mythical Second Team	October 5, 2025	
Zavier Lucero	2024–25 PBA All-Defensive Team	October 5, 2025	
