= Chris Koon =

Filipino-American basketball player

No. 6 – Magnolia Chicken Timplados Hotshots
- Position: Small forward / shooting guard
- League: PBA

Personal information
- Born: February 6, 2001 (age 25)
- Listed height: 6 ft 5 in (1.96 m)

Career information
- High school: Rolling Hills Prep (Los Angeles, California)
- College: Ateneo (2020–2024)
- PBA draft: 2025: 1st round, 4th overall pick
- Drafted by: NorthPort Batang Pier
- Playing career: 2025–present

Career history
- 2025: Titan Ultra Giant Risers
- 2025–present: Magnolia Chicken Timplados Hotshots

Career highlights
- AsiaBasket champion (2023 Las Piñas); UAAP men's basketball champion (2022)

Christopher Tomas Koon (born February 6, 2001) is a Filipino-American professional basketball player for the Magnolia Chicken Timplados Hotshots of the Philippine Basketball Association (PBA).

A native of Torrance, California in the Los Angeles County, Koon played for Rolling Hills Prep in four years of high school, where he won a state title. In 2020, he joined the Ateneo Blue Eagles, winning a championship in Season 85 (2022)

In 2025, he was selected by the NorthPort Batang Pier with the fourth overall pick of the PBA season 50 draft, and would later play for its successor, the Titan Ultra Giant Risers. Early in his rookie season, he was traded to the Magnolia Chicken Timplados Hotshots.

== High school career ==
Koon played for Rolling Hills Prep in high school, where he averaged 16 points, 6.6 rebounds, and 4.4 assists per game. Along the way, he won three California Interscholastic Federation (CIF) Southern Section titles and a CIF state championship.

== College career ==
In 2019, he was recruited by California State Polytechnic University, Pomona to play for the Broncos. However he never played any games for the Broncos.

On September 11, 2020, Koon entered Philippine collegiate basketball with his commitment to play for Ateneo de Manila University's Blue Eagles. He concluded his stint with Ateneo in UAAP Season 87 in 2024.

== Professional career ==
=== Titan Ultra Giant Risers (2025) ===
After graduating, Koon briefly played for the Strong Group Athletics in Dubai, United Arab Emirates for the 34th Dubai International Basketball Championship in early 2025.

Koon later joined the Philippine Basketball Association via the Season 50 draft in September 2025. He was the fourth overall pick, being selected by the NorthPort Batang Pier. After signing a two-year contract with NorthPort's successor, Titan Ultra Giant Risers, he made his PBA debut at the 2025 Philippine Cup.

=== Magnolia Chicken Timplados Hotshots (2025–present) ===
On October 28, 2025, after playing just five games with Titan Ultra, Koon was traded to the Magnolia Chicken Timplados Hotshots in exchange for Aris Dionisio.

== PBA career statistics ==
Legend
GP	Games played	MPG	Minutes per game	FG%	Field-goal percentage
3FG%	3-point field-goal percentage	4P%	4-point field-goal percentage	FT%	Free-throw percentage
RPG	Rebounds per game	APG	Assists per game	SPG	Steals per game
BPG	Blocks per game	PPG	Points per game	127	Career high

As of the end of 2025–26 season

==== Season-by-season averages ====
Year	Team	GP	MPG	FG%	3P%	4P%	FT%	RPG	APG	SPG	BPG	PPG
2025–26	Titan Ultra	31	16.9	.327	.274	.500	.513	3.0	1.2	.4	.1	4.9
2025–26	Magnolia	31	16.9	.327	.274	.500	.513	3.0	1.2	.4	.1	4.9

== Personal life ==
Chris Koon hails from Torrance, California. Koon's mother Iderlina is a Filipina from Quezon City. Chris Koon is a dual citizen, having both American and Filipino citizenships.

== National team ==
Koon was named as part of the Philippine national 3x3 team for the 2026 FIBA 3x3 Asia Cup.
