= John Amores =

Filipino basketball player (born 1999)

No. 13 – Titan Ultra Giant Risers
- Position: Shooting guard
- League: PBA

Personal information
- Born: June 13, 1999 (age 27)
- Listed height: 6 ft 2 in (1.88 m)
- Listed weight: 178 lb (81 kg)

Career information
- High school: JRU (Mandaluyong)
- College: JRU
- PBA draft: 2023: 5th round, 51st overall pick
- Drafted by: NorthPort Batang Pier
- Playing career: 2023–2024, 2026–present

Career history
- 2023: Zamboanga Valientes
- 2023: Muntinlupa Cagers
- 2023–2024: NorthPort Batang Pier
- 2026–present: Titan Ultra Giant Risers

John Anthony Walker Amores (born June 13, 1999) is a Filipino professional basketball player for the Titan Ultra Giant Risers of the Philippine Basketball Association (PBA).

Amores played for the JRU Heavy Bombers in college before joining the professional ranks with the Zamboanga Valientes in 2022 in spite of his involvement in the collegiate stint-ending brawl with JRU. In 2023, he joined the Muntinlupa Cagers of the Maharlika Pilipinas Basketball League (MPBL) and was later selected by the NorthPort with the 51st pick of the PBA season 48 draft later that year.

== Early life and education ==
Amores was born on June 13, 1999. He played for the José Rizal University (JRU)'s high school basketball team, the JRU Light Bombers, in the National Collegiate Athletic Association (NCAA). In NCAA Season 94 (2018), Amores was named most improved player after the Light Bombers qualified to the Final Four, where they lost to the La Salle Green Hills Greenies.

== College career ==
After graduating high school, he then became a part of JRU's college basketball team, the JRU Heavy Bombers.

On July 26, 2022, during a Universities and Colleges Basketball League (UCBL) preseason game against the UP Fighting Maroons, Amores figured in altercation with the UP's players. UP's Mark Belmonte filed a "serious physical injury" case against Amores in September 2022.

Despite a complaint by Belmonte, he was still able to play for JRU in NCAA Season 98 (2022), but his season and college career was cut short following another incident on November 8, 2022, at the Filoil EcoOil Centre, where he assaulted players from the opposing Benilde Blazers. The NCAA suspended Amores indefinitely as a result. JRU handed Amores with another indefinite suspension. Nine others were suspended for one game, and two for two games. On November 16, 2022, JRU announced it upgraded its sanction on Amores from suspension to removal from its entire sports program.

== Professional career ==
=== Zamboanga Valientes (2023) ===
Amores continued playing competitive basketball after college although his involvement in the NCAA brawl was a dent to his career. He was able to play professional leagues in the Philippines which are sanctioned by the Games and Amusements Board (GAB) after he apologized for the incident under the condition that he would undergo anger management therapy.

Amores made his professional debut for the Zamboanga Valientes of the ASEAN Basketball League for the 2023 Invitational. He also helped his team win the 2023 Open Pilipinas VisMin Super Cup.

=== Muntinlupa Cagers (2023) ===
The Muntinlupa Cagers signed in Amores for the 2023 season of the Maharlika Pilipinas Basketball League.

=== NorthPort Batang Pier (2023–2024) ===
Amores took part in the Philippine Basketball Association (PBA) Season 48 draft and was selected by the NorthPort Batang Pier as the 51st overall pick on September 17, 2023. NorthPort and Amores agreed on a one-year contract, which was later extended to two years.

For his involvement in an off-the-court shooting incident in Laguna the PBA suspended him from taking part at the 2024–25 Commissioner's Cup Separately, GAB revoked Amores' professional license after the incident.

=== Titan Ultra Giant Risers (2026–) ===
Two years after the Laguna shooting incident and the resolution of his criminal case, Amores' GAB license were reinstated and the PBA allowed him to return. He signed a one-conference contract with the Titan Ultra Giant Risers in July 2026 to play at the 2026 Governors' Cup.

== PBA career statistics ==
Legend
GP	Games played	MPG	Minutes per game	FG%	Field-goal percentage
3FG%	3-point field-goal percentage	4P%	4-point field-goal percentage	FT%	Free-throw percentage
RPG	Rebounds per game	APG	Assists per game	SPG	Steals per game
BPG	Blocks per game	PPG	Points per game	127	Career high

As of the end of 2025–26 season

=== Season-by-season averages ===
Year	Team	GP	MPG	FG%	3P%	4P%	FT%	RPG	APG	SPG	BPG	PPG
2023–24	NorthPort	19	7.8	.447	.300	—	.824	1.5	.4	.2	—	3.3
2024–25	NorthPort	10	12.2	.486	.467	.400	.571	1.6	.4	.4	—	5.1
2025–26	Titan Ultra	10	7.4	.393	.200	.200	—	1.2	—	.2	.1	2.6
Career		39	8.8	.446	.333	.300	.750	1.4	.3	.2	.0	3.6

== Personal life ==
Amores is a resident of Pagsanjan, Laguna. He is the third of four children. His father worked as a tricycle and truck driver but later sold viands and vegetables with his mother for a living. He is married to Cylina Dicee with whom he has three children. Family issues at the time was cited among the factors which led to his outburst in the November 2022 JRU brawl.

On September 25, 2024, Amores in the neighboring town of Lumban challenged a man in a fistfight and later alleged fired a gun on him over a disagreement over officiating in a prior basketball game. He alongside his brother surrendered to the police but posted bail for attempted homicide charges. The incident led to Amores' suspension from NorthPort in the PBA, and later a revocation of his license by the GAB. By May 2026, Amores has rendered mandatory community service and satisfied two mandatory neuro-psychiatric examinations to be eligible to reacquire a GAB license. The associated criminal charges were also reportedly resolved.
