= 2024–25 PBA Commissioner's Cup =

Second conference of the 2024–25 PBA season

- Duration: November 27, 2024 – March 28, 2025
- TV partner(s): Local: RPTV; PBA Rush (HD); International: Pilipinas Live; Online: Pilipinas Live

Finals
- Champions: TNT Tropang Giga
- Runners-up: Barangay Ginebra San Miguel

Awards
- Best Player: Arvin Tolentino (NorthPort Batang Pier)
- Best Import: Rondae Hollis-Jefferson (TNT Tropang Giga)
- Finals MVP: Rey Nambatac (TNT Tropang Giga)

PBA Commissioner's Cup chronology
- < 2023–24 2026 >

PBA conference chronology
- < 2024 Governors' Cup 2025 Philippine Cup >

The 2024–25 PBA Commissioner's Cup, also known as the 2024–25 Honda PBA Commissioner's Cup for sponsorship reasons, was the second conference of the 2024–25 PBA season of the Philippine Basketball Association (PBA). The 22nd edition of the Commissioner's Cup started on November 27, 2024, and ended on March 28, 2025. The tournament allowed teams to hire foreign players or imports with unlimited height limit.

It was initially reported that the champions of this conference would represent the Philippines at the 2025 Basketball Champions League Asia, before it was instead awarded to the Meralco Bolts as champions of the 2024 PBA Philippine Cup. The PBA previously skipped the 2024 edition of the Asian continental club tournament.

== Format ==
- All participating teams played in a single round-robin elimination, with each team playing 12 games throughout the duration of the conference.
- Teams were ranked by win-loss records with the top eight teams advancing to the playoffs. Any ties were broken using tiebreaker criteria.
  - If there is a tie for 8th place, a one-game playoff is instead used to determine which team gets the final playoff spot.
- The playoff formats were as follows:
- Quarterfinals:
  - QF1: #1 vs #8 (#1 twice-to-beat)
  - QF2: #2 vs #7 (#2 twice-to-beat)
  - QF3: #3 vs #6 (best-of-3 series)
  - QF4: #4 vs #5 (best-of-3 series)
- Semifinals (best-of-seven series):
  - SF1: QF1 winner vs. QF4 winner
  - SF2: QF2 winner vs. QF3 winner
- Finals (best-of-seven series)
  - F1: SF1 winner vs SF2 winner

== Elimination round ==
=== Team standings ===
| Pos | Team | W | L | PCT | GB | Qualification |
|---|---|---|---|---|---|---|
| 1 | NorthPort Batang Pier | 9 | 3 | .750 | — | Twice-to-beat in the quarterfinals |
| 2 | TNT Tropang Giga | 8 | 4 | .667 (Note: Head-to-head quotient: TNT 1.04, Converge 1.03, Barangay Ginebra 0.94) | 1 | Twice-to-beat in the quarterfinals |
| 3 | Converge FiberXers | 8 | 4 | .667 | 1 | Best-of-three quarterfinals |
| 4 | Barangay Ginebra San Miguel | 8 | 4 | .667 | 1 | Best-of-three quarterfinals |
| 5 | Meralco Bolts | 7 | 5 | .583 (Note: Head-to-head quotient: Meralco 1.08, Rain or Shine 1.04, Eastern 0.88) | 2 | Best-of-three quarterfinals |
| 6 | Rain or Shine Elasto Painters | 7 | 5 | .583 | 2 | Best-of-three quarterfinals |
| 7 | Eastern (G) | 7 | 5 | .583 | 2 | Twice-to-win in the quarterfinals |
| 8 | Magnolia Chicken Timplados Hotshots | 6 | 6 | .500 (Note: Eighth seed playoff: Magnolia 112–81 NLEX) | 3 | Twice-to-win in the quarterfinals |
| 9 | NLEX Road Warriors | 6 | 6 | .500 | 3 | |
| 10 | San Miguel Beermen | 5 | 7 | .417 | 4 | |
| 11 | Blackwater Bossing | 3 | 9 | .250 (Note: Head-to-head record: Blackwater 1–0 Phoenix) | 6 | |
| 12 | Phoenix Fuel Masters | 3 | 9 | .250 | 6 | |
| 13 | Terrafirma Dyip | 1 | 11 | .083 | 8 | |

Source: PBA.ph
Rules for classification: 1) winning percentage; 2) if two teams are tied, head-to-head record; if three or more teams are tied, head-to-head goal average (quotient); if tied for 8th, one-game playoff; 3) overall quotient; 4) coin toss
(G) Guests

=== Results table ===
| Team | Game | | | | | | | | | | | |
| Team | 1 | 2 | 3 | 4 | 5 | 6 | 7 | 8 | 9 | 10 | 11 | 12 |
|---|---|---|---|---|---|---|---|---|---|---|---|---|
| Barangay Ginebra (BGSM) | NLEX; 109–100 | PHX; 94–72 | EAST; 90–93 | TER; 114–98 | CON; 91–98 | MAG; 95–92 | SMB; 93–81 | NP; 116–119 | BWB; 86–63 | TNT; 86–91 | ROS; 120–92 | MER; 91–87 |
| Blackwater (BWB) | MAG; 100–118 | NLEX; 95–107 | EAST; 75–84 | MER; 114–98 | SMB; 102–115 | TNT; 93–109 | ROS; 106–122 | BGSM; 63–86 | TER; 96–86 | CON; 109–127 | PHX; 100–92 | NP; 93–120 |
| Converge (CON) | TER; 116–87 | EAST; 106–117 | MAG; 93–91 | NP; 101–108 | NLEX; 102–91 | PHX; 116–105 | BGSM; 98–91 | MER; 110–94 | TNT; 96–98 | ROS; 103–96 | BWB; 127–109 | SMB; 113–116 |
| Eastern (EAST) | PHX; 102–87 | CON; 117–106 | ROS; 81–99 | TNT; 105–84 | BWB; 84–75 | BGSM; 93–90 | NP; 113–120 | SMB; 99–91* | MER; 83–88 | TER; 134–110 | MAG; 78–107 | NLEX; 76–94 |
| Magnolia (MAG) | BWB; 118–100 | CON; 91–93 | NP; 103–107 | TNT; 100–103 | ROS; 100–102 | NLEX; 99–95* | BGSM; 92–95 | TER; 89–84 | SMB; 78–85 | PHX; 110–104 | EAST; 107–78 | MER; 129–92 |
| Meralco (MER) | PHX; 111–109 | ROS; 121–111 | TER; 96–91 | BWB; 98–114 | CON; 94–110 | EAST; 88–83 | TNT; 99–101 | NLEX; 105–91 | NP; 111–94 | SMB; 100–93 | BGSM; 87–91 | MAG; 92–129 |
| NLEX | NP; 87–114 | BWB; 107–95 | TER; 104–85 | SMB; 104–99 | BGSM; 100–109 | CON; 91–102 | MAG; 95–99* | MER; 91–105 | TNT; 87–94 | PHX; 108–94 | ROS; 122–110 | EAST; 94–76 |
| NorthPort (NP) | NLEX; 114–87 | TER; 113–101 | MAG; 107–103 | TNT; 100–95 | CON; 108–101 | PHX; 109–115 | EAST; 120–113 | BGSM; 119–116 | MER; 94–111 | ROS; 107–127 | SMB; 105–104 | BWB; 120–93 |
| Phoenix (PHX) | EAST; 87–102 | MER; 109–111 | SMB; 104–107 | BGSM; 72–94 | NP; 115–109 | CON; 105–116 | TER; 122–108 | ROS; 93–91 | MAG; 104–110 | NLEX; 94–108 | BWB; 92–100 | TNT; 70–106 |
| Rain or Shine (ROS) | MER; 111–121 | EAST; 99–81 | SMB; 107–93 | MAG; 102–100 | TER; 124–112 | BWB; 122–106 | PHX; 91–93 | CON; 96–103 | NP; 127–107 | BGSM; 92–120 | NLEX; 110–122 | TNT; 106–96 |
| San Miguel (SMB) | PHX; 107–104 | NLEX; 99–104 | ROS; 93–107 | TER; 106–88 | BWB; 115–102 | EAST; 91–99* | BGSM; 81–93 | MAG; 85–78 | MER; 93–100 | NP; 104–105 | CON; 116–113 | TNT; 97–115 |
| Terrafirma (TER) | CON; 87–116 | NP; 101–113 | NLEX; 85–104 | MER; 91–96 | SMB; 88–106 | BGSM; 98–114 | ROS; 112–124 | PHX; 108–122 | MAG; 84–89 | BWB; 86–96 | EAST; 110–134 | TNT; 117–108 |
| TNT | EAST; 84–105 | NP; 95–100 | MAG; 103–100 | BWB; 109–93 | MER; 101–99 | CON; 98–96 | NLEX; 94–87 | BGSM; 91–86 | TER; 108–117 | PHX; 106–70 | SMB; 115–97 | ROS; 96–106 |

Source: PBA.ph
Legend: Blue = win; Red = loss; Matches with lighter background shading were decided after overtime. (*) Number of asterisks denotes number of overtime periods

== Eighth seed playoff ==
RPTV

February 2, 2025
7:30 pm

Box score

Magnolia Chicken Timplados Hotshots 112, NLEX Road Warriors 81
Scoring by quarter: 21–21, 23–23, 36–23, 32–14
| Pts: Ratliffe 32; Rebs: Ratliffe 14; Asts: Barroca 6 | Pts: Bolick 27; Rebs: Watkins 14; Asts: Bolick 6 |

Ynares Center, Antipolo, Rizal
Referees: Mike Flordeliza, Peter Balao, Jerry Narandan, Jeffrey Tantay

== Bracket ==
Quarterfinals
(#1 twice-to-beat)
1 | NorthPort | 113
8 | Magnolia | 110
(Best-of-3)
4 | Barangay Ginebra | 2
5 | Meralco | 1
(#2 twice-to-beat)
2 | TNT | 109
7 | Eastern | 93
(Best-of-3)
3 | Converge | 1
6 | Rain or Shine | 2

Semifinals (Best-of-7)
1 | NorthPort | 1
4 | Barangay Ginebra | 4
2 | TNT | 4
6 | Rain or Shine | 1

Finals (Best-of-7)
4 | Barangay Ginebra | 3
2 | TNT | 4

== Quarterfinals ==
=== (1) NorthPort vs. (8) Magnolia ===
NorthPort has the twice-to-beat advantage; they have to be beaten twice, while their opponents just once, to advance.

RPTV

February 6, 2025
5:00 pm

Box score

NorthPort Batang Pier 113, Magnolia Chicken Timplados Hotshots 110
Scoring by quarter: 25–32, 22–29, 36–15, 30–34
| Pts: Jack 30; Rebs: Jack 10; Asts: Munzon 5 | Pts: Barroca 26; Rebs: Ratliffe 19; Asts: Barroca 10 |
NorthPort wins series in one game

Ninoy Aquino Stadium, Manila
Referees: Rommel Gruta, Peter Balao, Jeffrey Tantay, Irewin Traballo

=== (2) TNT vs. (7) Eastern ===
TNT has the twice-to-beat advantage; they have to be beaten twice, while their opponents just once, to advance.

RPTV

February 6, 2025
7:30 pm

Box score

TNT Tropang Giga 109, Eastern 93
Scoring by quarter: 27–24, 24–26, 29–23, 29–20
| Pts: Hollis-Jefferson 31; Rebs: Hollis-Jefferson 15; Asts: Hollis-Jefferson 4 | Pts: Blankley 24; Rebs: Clark 8 Asts: Yang 6 |
TNT wins series in one game

Ninoy Aquino Stadium, Manila
Referees: Bing Oliva, Mike Florderliza, Jerry Narandan, James Paez

=== (3) Converge vs. (6) Rain or Shine ===
This is a best-of-three playoff.

RPTV

February 5, 2025
5:00 pm

Box score

Converge FiberXers 130, Rain or Shine Elasto Painters 118
Scoring by quarter: 26–39, 38–23, 35–34, 31–22
| Pts: Diallo 35; Rebs: Diallo 17; Asts: Stockton 10 | Pts: Tiongson 23; Rebs: Thompson 6 Asts: Asistio 5 |

Araneta Coliseum, Quezon City
Referees: Rommel Gruta, Mardy Montoya, Joel Baldago, Irewin Traballo

RPTV

February 7, 2025
7:30 pm

Box score

Converge FiberXers 104, Rain or Shine Elasto Painters 114
Scoring by quarter: 29–23, 24–28, 27–34, 24–29
| Pts: Heading 29; Rebs: Diallo 15; Asts: Heading, Winston 6 | Pts: Nocum, Thompson 28; Rebs: Thompson 18; Asts: Thompson 7 |

Ninoy Aquino Stadium, Manila
Referees: Nol Quilinguen, Jerry Narandan, Albert Nubla, Karlo Vergara

RPTV

February 9, 2025
5:00 pm

Box score

Converge FiberXers 103, Rain or Shine Elasto Painters 112
Scoring by quarter: 21–22, 24–28, 32–30, 26–32
| Pts: Stockton 26; Rebs: Diallo 13; Asts: Stockton 6 | Pts: Thompson 34; Rebs: Thompson 12; Asts: Thompson 7 |
Rain or Shine wins series, 2–1

Ynares Center, Antipolo, Rizal
Referees: Bing Oliva, Mardy Montoya, Mike Flordeliza, Irewin Traballo

=== (4) Barangay Ginebra vs. (5) Meralco ===
This is a best-of-three playoff.

RPTV

February 5, 2025
7:30 pm

Box score

Barangay Ginebra San Miguel 100, Meralco Bolts 92
Scoring by quarter: 24–17, 26–30, 28–29, 22–16
| Pts: Brownlee, Thompson 23; Rebs: Aguilar, Brownlee 9 Asts: Abarrientos, Thompson 6 | Pts: Newsome 20; Rebs: Mitchell 14; Asts: Mitchell 6 |

Araneta Coliseum, Quezon City
Referees: Peter Balao, Jerry Narandan, Albert Nubla, Jeffrey Tantay

RPTV

February 7, 2025
5:00 pm

Box score

Barangay Ginebra San Miguel 104, Meralco Bolts 108
Scoring by quarter: 25–26, 28–32, 28–27, 23–23
| Pts: Brownlee 36; Rebs: Rosario, Thompson 9 Asts: Brownlee 4 | Pts: Newsome 24; Rebs: Mitchell 17; Asts: Mitchell 10 |

Ninoy Aquino Stadium, Manila
Referees: Bing Oliva, Mike Flordeliza, Irewin Traballo, James Paez

RPTV

February 9, 2025
7:30 pm

Box score

Barangay Ginebra San Miguel 94, Meralco Bolts 87
Scoring by quarter: 19–22, 18–16, 27–20, 30–29
| Pts: Brownlee 25; Rebs: Brownlee 10; Asts: Brownlee 7 | Pts: Newsome 22; Rebs: Mitchell 12; Asts: three players 3 |
Barangay Ginebra wins series, 2–1

Ynares Center, Antipolo, Rizal
Referees: Peter Balao, Jerry Narandan, Jeffrey Tantay, Kenny Hallig

== Semifinals ==
The semifinals is a best-of-seven playoff.

=== (1) NorthPort vs. (4) Barangay Ginebra ===
RPTV

February 26, 2025
7:30 pm

Box score

NorthPort Batang Pier 93, Barangay Ginebra San Miguel 115
Scoring by quarter: 22–31, 29–25, 14–32, 28–27
| Pts: Jack 33; Rebs: Jack 12; Asts: Munzon 3 | Pts: Brownlee 19; Rebs: Rosario 8 Asts: Abarrientos 7 |

Araneta Coliseum, Quezon City
Referees: Peter Balao, Jerry Narandan, Kenny Hallig, James Paez

RPTV

February 28, 2025
5:00 pm

Box score

NorthPort Batang Pier 106, Barangay Ginebra San Miguel 119
Scoring by quarter: 22–35, 17–33, 28–25, 39–26
| Pts: Jack 27; Rebs: Navarro 12; Asts: Yu 6 | Pts: Aguilar 31; Rebs: Holt 10; Asts: Brownlee 11 |

PhilSports Arena, Pasig
Referees: Rommel Gruta, Mardy Montoya, Bryan Peclaro, Irewin Traballo

RPTV

March 2, 2025
7:30 pm

Box score

NorthPort Batang Pier 100, Barangay Ginebra San Miguel 127
Scoring by quarter: 21–30, 19–34, 28–35, 32–28
| Pts: Jack 32; Rebs: Flores, Tolentino 5 Asts: Jack, Yu 4 | Pts: Malonzo 25; Rebs: Brownlee, Malonzo 8 Asts: Abarrientos 10 |

Araneta Coliseum, Quezon City
Referees: Peter Balao, Bing Oliva, Janine Nicandro, James Paez

RPTV

March 5, 2025
5:00 pm

Box score

NorthPort Batang Pier 108, Barangay Ginebra San Miguel 103
Scoring by quarter: 21–22, 33–28, 30–24, 24–29
| Pts: Jack 39; Rebs: Jack 15; Asts: Tolentino 11 | Pts: Abarrientos, Brownlee 18; Rebs: Rosario 13; Asts: Thompson 8 |

Araneta Coliseum, Quezon City
Referees: Mike Flordeliza, Jeffrey Tantay, Bryan Peclaro, Nol Quilinguen

RPTV

March 7, 2025
7:30 pm

Box score

NorthPort Batang Pier 99, Barangay Ginebra San Miguel 126
Scoring by quarter: 22–23, 31–39, 23–35, 23–29
| Pts: Jack 31; Rebs: Tolentino 13; Asts: Munzon 11 | Pts: Brownlee 21; Rebs: Brownlee 11; Asts: Abarrientos 10 |
Barangay Ginebra wins series, 4–1

Araneta Coliseum, Quezon City
Referees: Peter Balao, Mike Flordeliza, Jeffrey Tantay, Kenny Hallig

=== (2) TNT vs. (6) Rain or Shine ===
RPTV

February 26, 2025
5:00 pm

Box score

TNT Tropang Giga 88, Rain or Shine Elasto Painters 84
Scoring by quarter: 22–28, 29–19, 23–23, 14–14
| Pts: Castro 24; Rebs: Hollis-Jefferson 13; Asts: Hollis-Jefferson 5 | Pts: Thompson 29; Rebs: Thompson 16; Asts: Caracut 4 |

Araneta Coliseum, Quezon City
Referees: Rommel Gruta, Mike Flordeliza, Albert Nubla, Karlo Vergara

RPTV

February 28, 2025
7:30 pm

Box score

TNT Tropang Giga 93, Rain or Shine Elasto Painters 91
Scoring by quarter: 24–24, 30–20, 27–31, 12–16
| Pts: Hollis-Jefferson 28; Rebs: Hollis-Jefferson 10; Asts: Castro 5 | Pts: Thompson 22; Rebs: Thompson 14; Asts: Thompson 5 |

PhilSports Arena, Pasig
Referees: Peter Balao, Jerry Narandan, Janine Nicandro, James Paez

RPTV

March 2, 2025
5:00 pm

Box score

TNT Tropang Giga 98, Rain or Shine Elasto Painters 103
Scoring by quarter: 21–21, 22–28, 30–26, 25–28
| Pts: Hollis-Jefferson 34; Rebs: Hollis-Jefferson 19; Asts: Nambatac 3 | Pts: Thompson 19; Rebs: Thompson 15; Asts: five players 4 |

Araneta Coliseum, Quezon City
Referees: Mike Flordeliza, Mardy Montoya, Bryan Peclaro, Nol Quilinguen

RPTV

March 5, 2025
7:30 pm

Box score

TNT Tropang Giga 93, Rain or Shine Elasto Painters 85
Scoring by quarter: 26–21, 27–22, 20–24, 20–18
| Pts: Oftana 26; Rebs: Hollis-Jefferson 11; Asts: Hollis-Jefferson 5 | Pts: Thompson 44; Rebs: Thompson 13; Asts: Nocum 5 |

Araneta Coliseum, Quezon City
Referees: Rommel Gruta, Jerry Narandan, Irewin Traballo, Karlo Vergara

RPTV

March 7, 2025
5:00 pm

Box score

TNT Tropang Giga 97, Rain or Shine Elasto Painters 92
Scoring by quarter: 28–27, 16–19, 22–21, 31–25
| Pts: Hollis-Jefferson 42; Rebs: Oftana 12; Asts: Nambatac 8 | Pts: Thompson 34; Rebs: Santillan 7 Asts: Nocum 7 |
TNT wins series, 4–1

Araneta Coliseum, Quezon City
Referees: Nol Quilinguen, Bing Oliva, Mardy Montoya, James Paez

== Finals ==
This is a best-of-seven playoff.

RPTV

March 14, 2025
7:30 pm

Box score

TNT Tropang Giga 95, Barangay Ginebra San Miguel 89

SM Mall of Asia Arena, Pasay

RPTV

March 16, 2025
7:30 pm

Box score

TNT Tropang Giga 70, Barangay Ginebra San Miguel 71

SM Mall of Asia Arena, Pasay

RPTV

March 19, 2025
7:30 pm

Box score

TNT Tropang Giga 87, Barangay Ginebra San Miguel 85

PhilSports Arena, Pasig

RPTV

March 21, 2025
7:35 pm

Box score

TNT Tropang Giga 78, Barangay Ginebra San Miguel 95

Ynares Center, Antipolo, Rizal

RPTV

March 23, 2025
7:30 pm

Box score

TNT Tropang Giga 66, Barangay Ginebra San Miguel 73

Araneta Coliseum, Quezon City

RPTV

March 26, 2025
7:30 pm

Box score

TNT Tropang Giga 87, Barangay Ginebra San Miguel 83

Araneta Coliseum, Quezon City

RPTV

March 28, 2025
7:30 pm

Box score

TNT Tropang Giga 87, Barangay Ginebra San Miguel 83 (OT)
TNT wins series, 4–3

Araneta Coliseum, Quezon City

== Imports ==
The following is the list of imports, which had played for their respective teams at least once, with the returning imports in italics. Highlighted are the imports who stayed with their respective teams for the whole conference.

Guest team Eastern is also subjected to the same rules with the PBA making it choose between Cameron Clark or Chris McLaughlin as its designated import player, although it also has other players born outside Hong Kong in its PBA roster.

| Team | Name | Debuted | Last game | Record | Ref. |
|---|---|---|---|---|---|
| Barangay Ginebra San Miguel | (United States) Justin Brownlee | December 11, 2024 (vs. NLEX) | March 28, 2025 (vs. TNT) | 17–9 | |
| Blackwater Bossing | (United States) George King | November 28, 2024 (vs. Magnolia) | January 19, 2025 (vs. Converge) | 2–8 | |
| Blackwater Bossing | No import | January 21, 2025 (vs. Phoenix), January 25, 2025 (vs. NorthPort) | | 1–1 | |
| Converge FiberXers | (Mali) Cheick Diallo | November 27, 2024 (vs. Terrafirma) | February 9, 2025 (vs. Rain or Shine) | 9–6 | |
| Eastern | (United States) Cameron Clark | November 27, 2024 (vs. Phoenix) | February 6, 2025 (vs. TNT) | 3–2 | |
| Eastern | (Canada) Chris McLaughlin | December 10, 2024 (vs. Blackwater) | January 29, 2025 (vs. NLEX) | 4–4 | |
| Magnolia Chicken Timplados Hotshots | (United States) Ricardo Ratliffe | November 28, 2024 (vs. Blackwater) | February 6, 2025 (vs. NorthPort) | 7–7 | |
| Meralco Bolts | (United States) Akil Mitchell | November 29, 2024 (vs. Phoenix) | February 9, 2025 (vs. Barangay Ginebra) | 7–4 | |
| Meralco Bolts | (United States) D. J. Kennedy | December 6, 2024 (vs. Terrafirma) | | 1–0 | |
| Meralco Bolts | No import | December 12, 2024 (vs. Blackwater), January 29, 2025 (vs. Barangay Ginebra), January 31, 2025 (vs. Magnolia) | | 0–3 | |
| NLEX Road Warriors | (United States) Mike Watkins | November 28, 2024 (vs. NorthPort) | February 2, 2025 (vs. Magnolia) | 6–7 | |
| NorthPort Batang Pier | (United States) Kadeem Jack | November 28, 2024 (vs. NLEX) | March 7, 2025 (vs. Barangay Ginebra) | 11–7 | |
| Phoenix Fuel Masters | (United States) Donovan Smith | November 27, 2024 (vs. Eastern) | January 24, 2025 (vs. TNT) | 3–9 | |
| Rain or Shine Elasto Painters | No import | December 1, 2024 (vs. Meralco) | | 0–1 | |
| Rain or Shine Elasto Painters | (United States) Deon Thompson | December 4, 2024 (vs. Eastern) | March 7, 2025 (vs. TNT) | 10–9 | |
| San Miguel Beermen | (United States) Quincy Miller | December 3, 2024 (vs. Phoenix) | December 10, 2024 (vs. Rain or Shine) | 1–2 | |
| San Miguel Beermen | (United States) Torren Jones | December 13, 2024 (vs. Terrafirma) | December 15, 2024 (vs. Blackwater) | 2–0 | |
| San Miguel Beermen | (Trinidad and Tobago) Jabari Narcis | December 22, 2024 (vs. Eastern) | January 12, 2025 (vs. Magnolia) | 1–2 | |
| San Miguel Beermen | (United States) Malik Pope | January 18, 2025 (vs. Meralco) | January 26, 2025 (vs. TNT) | 1–3 | |
| Terrafirma Dyip | (United Kingdom) Ryan Richards | November 27, 2024 (vs. Converge) | December 3, 2024 (vs. NLEX) | 0–3 | |
| Terrafirma Dyip | (United States) Brandon Edwards | December 6, 2024 (vs. Meralco) | January 22, 2025 (vs. TNT) | 1–8 | |
| TNT Tropang Giga | (United States) Rondae Hollis-Jefferson | December 6, 2024 (vs. Eastern) | March 28, 2025 (vs. Barangay Ginebra) | 16–8 | |

== Awards ==
=== Player of the Week ===
| Week | Player | Ref. |
|---|---|---|
| November 27 – December 1 | Bong Quinto (Meralco Bolts) | |
| December 3–8 | Joshua Munzon (NorthPort Batang Pier) | |
| December 10–15 | Calvin Oftana (TNT Tropang Giga) | |
| December 17–25 | Jordan Heading (Converge FiberXers) | |
| January 5–12 | Joshua Munzon (NorthPort Batang Pier) | |
| January 14–19 | Chris Banchero (Meralco Bolts) | |
| January 21–26 | Robert Bolick (NLEX Road Warriors) | |
| January 29 – February 2 | Zavier Lucero (Magnolia Chicken Timplados Hotshots) | |
| February 5–9 | Adrian Nocum (Rain or Shine Elasto Painters) | |
| February 26 – March 2 | Jayson Castro (TNT Tropang Giga) | |
| March 5–7 | Calvin Oftana (TNT Tropang Giga) | |

=== Rookie of the Week ===
| Week | Player | Ref. |
|---|---|---|
| November 27 – December 1 | Mark Nonoy (Terrafirma Dyip) | |
| December 3–8 | Xyrus Torres (NLEX Road Warriors) | |
| December 10–15 | Sedrick Barefield (Blackwater Bossing) | |
| December 17–25 | RJ Abarrientos (Barangay Ginebra San Miguel) | |
| January 5–12 | RJ Abarrientos (Barangay Ginebra San Miguel) | |
| January 14–19 | Peter Alfaro (Magnolia Chicken Timplados Hotshots) | |
| January 21–26 | Mark Nonoy (Terrafirma Dyip) | |
| January 29 – February 2 | RJ Abarrientos (Barangay Ginebra San Miguel) | |

=== Reinforcement of the Week ===
| Week | Player | Ref. |
|---|---|---|
| November 27 – December 1 | Cameron Clark (Eastern) | |
| December 3–8 | Kadeem Jack (NorthPort Batang Pier) | |
| December 10–15 | Rondae Hollis-Jefferson (TNT Tropang Giga) | |
| December 17–25 | Cheick Diallo (Converge FiberXers) | |
| January 5–12 | Donovan Smith (Phoenix Fuel Masters) | |
| January 14–19 | Akil Mitchell (Meralco Bolts) | |
| January 21–26 | Rondae Hollis-Jefferson (TNT Tropang Giga) | |
| January 29 – February 2 | Ricardo Ratliffe (Magnolia Chicken Timplados Hotshots) | |
| February 5–9 | Deon Thompson (Rain or Shine Elasto Painters) | |

== Statistics ==
=== Individual statistical leaders ===
==== Local players ====
| Category | Player | Team | Statistic |
|---|---|---|---|
| Points per game | Robert Bolick | NLEX Road Warriors | 23.3 |
| Rebounds per game | June Mar Fajardo | San Miguel Beermen | 16.3 |
| Assists per game | Robert Bolick | NLEX Road Warriors | 8.0 |
| Steals per game | Joshua Munzon | NorthPort Batang Pier | 2.1 |
| Blocks per game | Kemark Cariño | Terrafirma Dyip | 1.2 |
| Turnovers per game | four players | | 3.3 |
| Fouls per game | Ramon Cao | Eastern | 3.8 |
| Fouls per game | Cliff Hodge | Meralco Bolts | 3.8 |
| Minutes per game | June Mar Fajardo | San Miguel Beermen | 39.4 |
| FG% | Louie Sangalang | Terrafirma Dyip | 58.3% |
| FT% | Paul Lee | Magnolia Chicken Timplados Hotshots | 100.0% |
| 3FG% | Robbie Herndon | NLEX Road Warriors | 54.5% |
| 4FG% | Robert Bolick | NLEX Road Warriors | 28.1% |
| Double-doubles | June Mar Fajardo | San Miguel Beermen | 11 |
| Triple-doubles | Arvin Tolentino | NorthPort Batang Pier | 2 |

==== Import players ====
| Category | Player | Team | Statistic |
|---|---|---|---|
| Points per game | George King | Blackwater Bossing | 34.5 |
| Rebounds per game | Mike Watkins | NLEX Road Warriors | 21.3 |
| Assists per game | Rondae Hollis-Jefferson | TNT Tropang Giga | 5.6 |
| Steals per game | Akil Mitchell | Meralco Bolts | 3.3 |
| Blocks per game | Mike Watkins | NLEX Road Warriors | 2.6 |
| Turnovers per game | Mike Watkins | NLEX Road Warriors | 3.8 |
| Fouls per game | Chris McLaughlin | Eastern | 3.4 |
| Minutes per game | Mike Watkins | NLEX Road Warriors | 44.3 |
| FG% | Cheick Diallo | Converge FiberXers | 61.2% |
| FT% | George King | Blackwater Bossing | 91.2% |
| 3FG% | Cameron Clark | Eastern | 53.8% |
| 4FG% | George King | Blackwater Bossing | 31.3% |
| Double-doubles | Rondae Hollis-Jefferson | TNT Tropang Giga | 22 |
| Triple-doubles | Rondae Hollis-Jefferson | TNT Tropang Giga | 1 |
| Triple-doubles | Akil Mitchell | Meralco Bolts | 1 |

=== Individual game highs ===
==== Local players ====
| Category | Player | Team | Statistic |
|---|---|---|---|
| Points | Calvin Oftana | TNT Tropang Giga | 42 |
| Rebounds | June Mar Fajardo | San Miguel Beermen | 23 |
| Assists | Scottie Thompson | Barangay Ginebra San Miguel | 13 |
| Steals | four players | | 5 |
| Blocks | Cliff Hodge | Meralco Bolts | 5 |
| Three point field goals | Calvin Oftana | TNT Tropang Giga | 9 |
| Four point field goals | Jerrick Ahanmisi | Magnolia Chicken Timplados Hotshots | 3 |
| Four point field goals | Paul Lee | Magnolia Chicken Timplados Hotshots | 3 |

==== Import players ====
| Category | Player | Team | Statistic |
|---|---|---|---|
| Points | Justin Brownlee | Barangay Ginebra San Miguel | 49 |
| Rebounds | Mike Watkins | NLEX Road Warriors | 30 |
| Assists | Justin Brownlee | Barangay Ginebra San Miguel | 11 |
| Steals | Akil Mitchell | Meralco Bolts | 7 |
| Blocks | Donovan Smith | Phoenix Fuel Masters | 5 |
| Three point field goals | Justin Brownlee | Barangay Ginebra San Miguel | 6 |
| Four point field goals | George King (4 times) | Blackwater Bossing | 4 |
| Four point field goals | Donovan Smith | Phoenix Fuel Masters | 4 |

=== Team statistical leaders ===
| Category | Team | Statistic |
|---|---|---|
| Points per game | NorthPort Batang Pier | 109.7 |
| Rebounds per game | San Miguel Beermen | 54.7 |
| Assists per game | Barangay Ginebra San Miguel | 24.3 |
| Steals per game | NorthPort Batang Pier | 11.2 |
| Blocks per game | NorthPort Batang Pier | 4.4 |
| Turnovers per game | Magnolia Chicken Timplados Hotshots | 15.5 |
| Fouls per game | Eastern | 28.4 |
| FG% | Converge FiberXers | 48.0% |
| FT% | Blackwater Bossing | 80.4% |
| 3FG% | Converge FiberXers | 38.8% |
| 4FG% | Blackwater Bossing | 28.9% |

== Final rankings ==
| Pos | Team | Pld | W | L | Best finish |
|---|---|---|---|---|---|
| 1 | TNT Tropang Giga (C) | 25 | 17 | 8 | Champion |
| 2 | Barangay Ginebra San Miguel | 27 | 17 | 10 | Runner-up |
| 3 | NorthPort Batang Pier | 18 | 11 | 7 | Semifinalist |
| 4 | Rain or Shine Elasto Painters | 20 | 10 | 10 | Semifinalist |
| 5 | Converge FiberXers | 15 | 9 | 6 | Quarterfinalist |
| 6 | Meralco Bolts | 15 | 8 | 7 | Quarterfinalist |
| 7 | Eastern (G) | 13 | 7 | 6 | Quarterfinalist |
| 8 | Magnolia Chicken Timplados Hotshots | 14 | 7 | 7 | Quarterfinalist |
| 9 | NLEX Road Warriors | 13 | 6 | 7 | Elimination round |
| 10 | San Miguel Beermen | 12 | 5 | 7 | Elimination round |
| 11 | Blackwater Bossing | 12 | 3 | 9 | Elimination round |
| 12 | Phoenix Fuel Masters | 12 | 3 | 9 | Elimination round |
| 13 | Terrafirma Dyip | 12 | 1 | 11 | Elimination round |

Rules for classification: 1) finals result, 2) elimination round seed of semifinalists, 3) elimination round seed of quarterfinalists, 4) elimination round finish
(C) Champions; (G) Guests
