= Mario Barasi =

Filipino basketball player

Titan Ultra Giant Risers
- Position: Center
- League: PBA

Personal information
- Born: August 9, 2000 (age 26) Lal-lo, Cagayan, Philippines
- Listed height: 6 ft 8 in (2.03 m)

Career information
- College: Adamson
- PBA draft: 2025: 2nd round, 13th overall pick
- Drafted by: Barangay Ginebra San Miguel
- Playing career: 2025–present

Career history
- 2025: Basilan Viva Portmasters/Starhorse
- 2025–present: Titan Ultra Giant Risers

Career highlights
- AsiaBasket champion (2025 International)

Mario Barasi Jr. (born August 9, 2000) is a Filipino professional basketball player for the Titan Ultra Giant Risers of the Philippine Basketball Association (PBA).

He played center for the Adamson Soaring Falcons of the University Athletic Association of the Philippines (UAAP).

== Collegiate career ==
Barasi played for the Adamson Soaring Falcons.

== Professional career ==
=== Basilan Starhorse (2025) ===
Barasi played for the Basilan Starhorse in 2025.

=== Titan Ultra Giant Risers (2025–present) ===
Barasi was selected by the Barangay Ginebra San Miguel with the 13th pick of the PBA season 50 draft. However, he was left unsigned and instead signed with the NorthPort Batang Pier (later becoming the Titan Ultra Giant Risers) on September 23.

== Career statistics ==
=== MPBL ===
Legend
GP	Games played	GS	Games started	MPG	Minutes per game
FG%	Field-goal percentage	3P%	3-point field-goal percentage	FT%	Free-throw percentage
RPG	Rebounds per game	APG	Assists per game	SPG	Steals per game
BPG	Blocks per game	PPG	Points per game	**Bold**	Career high

==== Season-by-season averages ====
As of the 2025 MPBL season, September 23, 2025

Year	Team	GP	GS	MPG	FG%	3P%	FT%	RPG	APG	SPG	BPG	PPG
2025	Basilan	8	0	5.8	.455	.000	.600	1.3	.3	.1	.4	1.6

=== PBA ===
Legend
GP	Games played	MPG	Minutes per game	FG%	Field-goal percentage
3FG%	3-point field-goal percentage	4P%	4-point field-goal percentage	FT%	Free-throw percentage
RPG	Rebounds per game	APG	Assists per game	SPG	Steals per game
BPG	Blocks per game	PPG	Points per game	**127**	Career high

As of the end of 2025–26 season

=== Season-by-season averages ===
Year	Team	GP	MPG	FG%	3P%	4P%	FT%	RPG	APG	SPG	BPG	PPG
2025–26	Titan Ultra	6	7.0	.667	—	—	.1000	1.7	—	—	—	1.3
