= James Martinez (basketball) =

Filipino basketball player

No. 13 – Titan Ultra Giant Risers
- Position: Point guard / shooting guard
- League: PBA

Personal information
- Born: January 31, 1987 (age 39)
- Listed height: 5 ft 9 in (1.75 m)
- Listed weight: 170 lb (77 kg)

Career information
- High school: San Beda (Manila)
- College: UE
- PBA draft: 2011: 2nd round, 18th overall pick
- Drafted by: Barangay Ginebra Kings
- Playing career: 2011–present

Career history
- 2011–2012: Powerade Tigers
- 2016: AMA Online Education
- 2018–2019: Bulacan Kuyas
- 2019–2020: Imus Bandera
- 2021: Bulacan Kuyas
- 2022: Quezon City MG
- 2022–2023: Bicol Spicy Oragons
- 2023: Bicol Volcanoes
- 2023–2024: Cam Norte Warriors
- 2024: Davao Occidental Tigers
- 2024–2025: Pureblends Similan Black Fox
- 2025: Ho Chi Minh City Wings
- 2025–present: Titan Ultra Giant Risers

James Vincent R. Martinez (born January 31, 1987) is a Filipino professional basketball player for the Titan Ultra Giant Risers of the Philippine Basketball Association (PBA).

== Career ==
=== Powerade Tigers (2011–2012) ===
He was drafted with the 18th overall pick by the Barangay Ginebra Kings in the 2011 PBA Draft and was later signed by the Powerade Tigers before the start of the upcoming season that time. During his short tenure in the PBA, he played both the point guard and the shooting guard positions. He played a season with the Powerade Tigers on the 2011–12 PBA season. On July 30, 2012, Coca-Cola Bottlers Philippines, Inc. announced that their PBA team, the Powerade Tigers, was sold to Sultan 900, Inc. which is owned and represented by its chairman and CEO Michael Romero. The Board of Governors unanimously approved the purchase on a special board meeting on August 17.

=== PBA D-League (2016) ===
After his PBA stint, Martinez played for AMA Online Education of the PBA D-League in 2016.

=== Regional basketball stint (2018–2025) ===
He debuted at the Maharlika Pilipinas Basketball League with the Bulacan Kuyas in February 2018.

=== Titan Ultra Giant Risers (2025–present) ===
On October 3, 2025, thirteen years since his last PBA stint, he made his return with the new Titan Ultra Giant Risers.

== PBA career statistics ==
Legend
GP	Games played	MPG	Minutes per game	FG%	Field-goal percentage
3FG%	3-point field-goal percentage	4P%	4-point field-goal percentage	FT%	Free-throw percentage
RPG	Rebounds per game	APG	Assists per game	SPG	Steals per game
BPG	Blocks per game	PPG	Points per game	127	Career high

As of the end of 2025–26 season

=== Season-by-season averages ===
Year	Team	GP	MPG	FG%	3P%	4P%	FT%	RPG	APG	SPG	BPG	PPG
2011–12	Powerade	16	5.2	.417	.353	—	.875	.2	.8	—	—	2.1
2025–26	Titan Ultra	5	2.0	.429	.250	—	.1000	.2	.6	—	—	1.8
Career		21	4.4	.419	.333	—	.900	.2	.7	—	—	2.0
