= 2025 PBA Philippine Cup =

Third conference of the 2024–25 PBA season

- Duration: April 4 – July 25, 2025
- TV partner(s): Local: RPTV; PBA Rush (HD); International: Pilipinas Live; Online: Pilipinas Live

Finals
- Champions: San Miguel Beermen
- Runners-up: TNT Tropang 5G

Awards
- Best Player: June Mar Fajardo (San Miguel Beermen)
- Finals MVP: Jericho Cruz (San Miguel Beermen)

PBA Philippine Cup chronology
- < 2024 2025–26 >

PBA conference chronology
- < 2024–25 Commissioner's 2025–26 Philippine Cup >

The 2025 PBA Philippine Cup, was the third and final conference of the 2024–25 PBA season of the Philippine Basketball Association (PBA). The 49th PBA Philippine Cup started on April 4 and ended on July 25, 2025. The tournament did not allow teams to hire foreign players or imports.

The 2025 PBA All-Star Weekend was supposed to be held from May 2 to 4 in Metro Davao, but was cancelled. The playoffs began on June 18 with the finals between the San Miguel Beermen and the TNT Tropang 5G starting on July 13.

The Meralco Bolts entered this conference as the defending Philippine Cup champions while TNT attempted to accomplish a Grand Slam by winning the conference championship.

== Format ==
- All participating teams play in a single round-robin elimination, with each team playing 11 games throughout the duration of the conference.
- Teams are ranked by win-loss records with the top eight teams advancing to the playoffs. Any ties are broken using tiebreaker criteria.
  - If there is a tie for 8th place, a one-game playoff is instead used to determine which team gets the final playoff spot.
- The playoff formats are as follows:
  - Quarterfinals (higher seeds twice-to-beat):
    - QF1: #1 vs #8
    - QF2: #2 vs #7
    - QF3: #3 vs #6
    - QF4: #4 vs #5
  - Semifinals (best-of-seven series):
    - SF1: QF1 winner vs. QF4 winner
    - SF2: QF2 winner vs. QF3 winner
  - Finals (best-of-seven series)

== Elimination round ==
=== Team standings ===
Pos	Team	W	L	PCT	GB	Qualification
1	San Miguel Beermen	8	3	.727 (Note: Head-to-head quotient: San Miguel 1.06, NLEX 1.01, Magnolia 0.97, Barangay Ginebra 0.96)	—	Twice-to-beat in the quarterfinals
2	NLEX Road Warriors	8	3	.727	—	Twice-to-beat in the quarterfinals
3	Magnolia Chicken Timplados Hotshots	8	3	.727	—	Twice-to-beat in the quarterfinals
4	Barangay Ginebra San Miguel	8	3	.727	—	Twice-to-beat in the quarterfinals
5	Converge FiberXers	7	4	.636	1	Twice-to-win in the quarterfinals
6	TNT Tropang 5G	6	5	.545 (Note: Head-to-head quotient: TNT 1.13, Rain or Shine 1.02, Meralco 0.87)	2	Twice-to-win in the quarterfinals
7	Rain or Shine Elasto Painters	6	5	.545	2	Twice-to-win in the quarterfinals
8	Meralco Bolts	6	5	.545	2	Twice-to-win in the quarterfinals
9	Phoenix Fuel Masters	4	7	.364	4	
10	Blackwater Bossing	2	9	.182 (Note: Head-to-head record: Blackwater 1–0 NorthPort)	6	
11	NorthPort Batang Pier	2	9	.182	6	
12	Terrafirma Dyip	1	10	.091	7	

Source: PBA.ph
Rules for classification: 1) winning percentage; 2) if two teams are tied, head-to-head record; if three or more teams are tied, head-to-head goal average (quotient); if tied for 8th, one-game playoff; 3) overall quotient; 4) coin toss

=== Results table ===
Team	Game										
Team	1	2	3	4	5	6	7	8	9	10	11
Barangay Ginebra (BGSM)	TER; 101–80	SMB; 93–104	NP; 131–106	NLEX; 86–89	CON; 85–66	PHX; 119–112	BWB; 101–99	MER; 73–82	MAG; 85–81	TNT; 97–78	ROS; 98–80
Blackwater (BWB)	MAG; 84–106	CON; 80–111	NP; 120–98	NLEX; 72–80	ROS; 106–120	MER; 85–103	BGSM; 99–101	SMB; 78–115	TNT; 82–108	TER; 97–82	PHX; 109–124
Converge (CON)	MER; 89–91	PHX; 92–83	MAG; 71–83	BWB; 111–80	TNT; 100–94	ROS; 107–97	BGSM; 66–85	NP; 111–92	NLEX; 83–88	TER; 117–103	SMB; 100–97
Magnolia (MAG)	BWB; 106–84	CON; 83–71	SMB; 98–95*	PHX; 118–99	TER; 127–94	MER; 117–92	ROS; 105–119	NP; 106–97	BGSM; 81–85	NLEX; 99–107	TNT; 88–83
Meralco (MER)	CON; 91–89	TER; 118–80	SMB; 98–110	PHX; 97–109	ROS; 116–128	NP; 105–104	TNT; 84–101	MAG; 92–117	BWB; 103–85	NLEX; 108–92	BGSM; 82–73
NLEX	SMB; 89–98	ROS; 109–95	TNT; 91–74	BWB; 80–72	BGSM; 89–86	TER; 117–87	CON; 88–83	MER; 92–108	PHX; 105–95	MAG; 107–99	NP; 108–113
NorthPort (NP)	TER; 97–75	ROS; 96–113	BWB; 98–120	BGSM; 106–131	MER; 104–105	CON; 92–111	MAG; 97–106	TNT; 70–94	PHX; 107–118	NLEX; 113–108	SMB; 91–126
Phoenix (PHX)	TER; 87–95	CON; 83–92	MER; 109–97	MAG; 99–118	TNT; 95–81	SMB; 92–111	BGSM; 112–119	ROS; 99–109	NLEX; 95–105	NP; 118–107	BWB; 124–109
Rain or Shine (ROS)	NLEX; 95–109	NP; 113–96	MER; 128–116	CON; 97–107	BWB; 120–106	MAG; 119–105	TNT; 103–111	PHX; 109–99	TER; 94–85	SMB; 111–120	BGSM; 80–98
San Miguel (SMB)	NLEX; 98–89	MER; 110–98	MAG; 95–98*	BGSM; 104–93	TNT; 84–89	PHX; 111–92	TER; 128–89	BWB; 115–78	ROS; 120–111	CON; 97–100	NP; 126–91
Terrafirma (TER)	PHX; 95–87	MER; 80–118	NP; 75–97	BGSM; 80–101	MAG; 94–127	TNT; 74–110	NLEX; 87–117	SMB; 89–128	CON; 103–117	ROS; 85–94	BWB; 82–97
TNT	NLEX; 74–91	CON; 94–100	PHX; 81–95	SMB; 89–84	TER; 110–74	MER; 101–84	ROS; 111–103	NP; 94–70	BWB; 108–82	BGSM; 78–97	MAG; 83–88

Source: PBA.ph
Legend: Blue = win; Red = loss; Matches with lighter background shading were decided after overtime. (*) Number of asterisks denotes number of overtime periods

=== PBA 50th anniversary games ===
On April 9, 2025, two games of the 2025 PBA Philippine Cup were held at the Rizal Memorial Coliseum as part of the 50th anniversary of PBA's foundation ahead of the 50th PBA season. Plans for the commemorative games were underway as early as March 2025.

The sole team still playing in the PBA when it was founded in 1975 are the San Miguel Beermen. The game between Meralco and San Miguel featured teams wearing "retro" jerseys. San Miguel's wore throwbacks from the 1982 season while Meralco's honor the 1971 Meralco Reddy Kilowatts from the MICAA. The television broadcast likewise had "retro" graphics. Spectators got discounted fare rates (or free of charge if they are born in 1975).

RPTV

April 9
5:00 pm

Box score

Magnolia Chicken Timplados Hotshots 83, Converge FiberXers 71
Scoring by quarter: 14–16, 22–17, 23–23, 24–15
Pts: Lucero, Sangalang 18; Rebs: Sangalang 9 Asts: Barroca 7	Pts: Arana, Winston 14; Rebs: Arana 14; Asts: Arana, Winston 3

Rizal Memorial Coliseum, Manila

RPTV

April 9
7:30 pm

Box score

Meralco Bolts 98, San Miguel Beermen 110
Scoring by quarter: 21–25, 17–27, 36–25, 24–33
Pts: Newsome 27; Rebs: Black, Hodge 7 Asts: Newsome 7	Pts: Perez 29; Rebs: Fajardo 10; Asts: three players 4

Rizal Memorial Coliseum, Manila

== Bracket ==
Quarterfinals (Top 4 twice-to-beat)
1	San Miguel	108
8	Meralco	97
4	Barangay Ginebra	88
5	Converge	80
2	NLEX	89	92
7	Rain or Shine	92	103
3	Magnolia	88	79
6	TNT	89	80

Semifinals (Best-of-7)
1	San Miguel	4
4	Barangay Ginebra	3
7	Rain or Shine	2
6	TNT	4

Finals (Best-of-7)
1	San Miguel	4
6	TNT	2

== Quarterfinals ==
The top four seeds have the twice-to-beat advantage; they have to be beaten twice, while their opponents just once, to advance.

=== (1) San Miguel vs. (8) Meralco ===
RPTV

June 20
5:00 pm

Box score

San Miguel Beermen 108, Meralco Bolts 97
Scoring by quarter: 35–20, 23–24, 23–31, 27–22
Pts: Fajardo 23; Rebs: Fajardo 15; Asts: Perez 9	Pts: Banchero 32; Rebs: Newsome 11; Asts: Newsome 6
San Miguel wins series in one game

Ninoy Aquino Stadium, Manila
Referees: Peter Balao, Bing Oliva, James Paez, John Francis Mira

=== (2) NLEX vs. (7) Rain or Shine ===
RPTV

June 18
5:00 pm

Box score

NLEX Road Warriors 89, Rain or Shine Elasto Painters 92
Scoring by quarter: 15–28, 22–19, 36–22, 16–23
Pts: Torres 20; Rebs: Bahio 14; Asts: three players 3	Pts: Clarito, Nocum 20; Rebs: Clarito 21; Asts: Norwood 3

PhilSports Arena, Pasig
Referees: Nol Quilinguen, Bing Oliva, Bryan Peclaro, Aaron Cañete

RPTV

June 21
7:30 pm

Box score

NLEX Road Warriors 92, Rain or Shine Elasto Painters 103
Scoring by quarter: 27–21, 28–31, 22–26, 15–25
Pts: Bolick 34; Rebs: Mocon, Ramirez 8 Asts: Bolick, Nieto 4	Pts: Santillan 24; Rebs: Clarito 16; Asts: Nocum 6
Rain or Shine wins series in two games

Ninoy Aquino Stadium, Manila
Referees: Peter Balao, Bing Oliva, Jerry Narandan, James Paez

=== (3) Magnolia vs. (6) TNT ===
RPTV

June 18
7:30 pm

Box score

Magnolia Chicken Timplados Hotshots 88, TNT Tropang 5G 89
Scoring by quarter: 22–18, 22–19, 21–24, 23–28
Pts: Lee 15; Rebs: Barroca 9 Asts: Barroca 11	Pts: Pogoy 30; Rebs: Oftana 16; Asts: Oftana 5

PhilSports Arena, Pasig
Referees: Peter Balao, Mike Flordeliza, Janine Nicandro, Charlie Amparado

RPTV

June 21
5:00 pm

Box score

Magnolia Chicken Timplados Hotshots 79, TNT Tropang 5G 80
Scoring by quarter: 15–18, 18–23, 23–22, 23–17
Pts: Lucero 15; Rebs: Lucero 10; Asts: Barroca 7	Pts: Oftana, Pogoy 18; Rebs: Williams 10; Asts: Pogoy 5
TNT wins series in two games

Ninoy Aquino Stadium, Manila
Referees: Nol Quilinguen, Rommel Gruta, Jeffrey Tantay, Aaron Cañete

=== (4) Barangay Ginebra vs. (5) Converge ===
RPTV

June 20
7:30 pm

Box score

Barangay Ginebra San Miguel 88, Converge FiberXers 80
Scoring by quarter: 21–26, 28–15, 24–18, 15–21
Pts: Abarrientos 21; Rebs: Aguilar 13; Asts: Abarrientos 4	Pts: Arana 15; Rebs: Baltazar 8 Asts: four players 3
Barangay Ginebra wins series in one game

Ninoy Aquino Stadium, Manila
Referees: Rommel Gruta, Mardy Montoya, Jerry Narandan, Cherwill Solon

== Semifinals ==
=== (1) San Miguel vs. (4) Barangay Ginebra ===
RPTV

June 25
7:30 pm

Box score

San Miguel Beermen 71, Barangay Ginebra San Miguel 73
Scoring by quarter: 29–19, 16–18, 15–19, 11–17
Pts: Perez 21; Rebs: Fajardo 19; Asts: Trollano 3	Pts: Aguilar 18; Rebs: Aguilar, Rosario 9 Asts: Abarrientos 7

SM Mall of Asia Arena, Pasay
Referees: Rommel Gruta, Bing Oliva, Jeffrey Tantay, Aaron Cañete

RPTV

June 27
5:00 pm

Box score

San Miguel Beermen 100, Barangay Ginebra San Miguel 83
Scoring by quarter: 26–15, 28–26, 22–20, 24–22
Pts: Lassiter 16; Rebs: Tautuaa 10; Asts: Rosales, Tiongson 4	Pts: Holt 17; Rebs: Thompson 6 Asts: Abarrientos, Aguilar 6

Ninoy Aquino Stadium, Manila
Referees: Rommel Gruta, Mike Flordeliza, James Paez, Cherwill Solon

RPTV

June 29
7:30 pm

Box score

San Miguel Beermen 90, Barangay Ginebra San Miguel 100
Scoring by quarter: 20–23, 30–23, 14–25, 26–29
Pts: Trollano 22; Rebs: Fajardo 14; Asts: Ross 5	Pts: Abarrientos 24; Rebs: Abarrientos 9 Asts: Abarrientos 8

Araneta Coliseum, Quezon City
Referees: Peter Balao, Janine Nicandro, Joel Baldago, Bryan Peclaro

RPTV

July 2
5:00 pm

Box score

San Miguel Beermen 107, Barangay Ginebra San Miguel 82
Scoring by quarter: 24–26, 26–25, 30–12, 27–19
Pts: Perez 19; Rebs: Fajardo 19; Asts: Perez 7	Pts: Rosario 14; Rebs: Aguilar, Rosario 7 Asts: Thompson 4

SM Mall of Asia Arena, Pasay
Referees: Nol Quilinguen, Bing Oliva, Bryan Peclaro, Janken Austero

RPTV

July 4
7:30 pm

Box score

San Miguel Beermen 103, Barangay Ginebra San Miguel 92
Scoring by quarter: 12–20, 37–24, 25–27, 29–21
Pts: Perez 31; Rebs: Fajardo 12; Asts: Fajardo 6	Pts: Ahanmisi 19; Rebs: Rosario 16; Asts: Abarrientos, Malonzo 4

Araneta Coliseum, Quezon City
Referees: Peter Balao, Joel Baldago, Jeffrey Tantay, John Francis Mira

RPTV

July 6
5:00 pm

Box score

San Miguel Beermen 87, Barangay Ginebra San Miguel 88
Scoring by quarter: 27–20, 27–25, 16–22, 17–21
Pts: Fajardo 21; Rebs: Fajardo 16; Asts: Fajardo 5	Pts: Thompson 17; Rebs: Thompson 16; Asts: Thompson 8

Araneta Coliseum, Quezon City
Referees: Peter Balao, Mardy Montoya, Jerry Narandan, Aaron Cañete

RPTV

July 9
7:30 pm

Box score

San Miguel Beermen 100, Barangay Ginebra San Miguel 93
Scoring by quarter: 17–23, 28–21, 21–29, 34–20
Pts: Fajardo 21; Rebs: Fajardo 19; Asts: Cruz, Ross 7	Pts: Malonzo 22; Rebs: Aguilar, Thompson 7 Asts: Thompson 8
San Miguel wins series, 4–3

Araneta Coliseum, Quezon City
Attendance: 12,279
Referees: Nol Quilinguen, Bing Oliva, Jerry Narandan, James Paez

=== (6) TNT vs. (7) Rain or Shine ===
RPTV

June 25
5:00 pm

Box score

TNT Tropang 5G 98, Rain or Shine Elasto Painters 91
Scoring by quarter: 23–23, 18–18, 22–17, 35–33
Pts: Pogoy 28; Rebs: three players 10; Asts: Enciso 5	Pts: Caracut 16; Rebs: Tiongson 8 Asts: Nocum, Tiongson 3

SM Mall of Asia Arena, Pasay
Referees: Nol Quilinguen, Mardy Montoya, Mike Flordeliza, Janine Nicandro

RPTV

June 27
7:30 pm

Box score

TNT Tropang 5G 113, Rain or Shine Elasto Painters 105 (OT)
Scoring by quarter: 21–25, 29–27, 28–18, 21–29, Overtime: 14–6
Pts: Oftana 39; Rebs: Williams 12; Asts: Heading 11	Pts: Nocum 27; Rebs: Clarito 8 Asts: Mamuyac 5

Ninoy Aquino Stadium, Manila
Referees: Peter Balao, Bing Oliva, Jerry Narandan, Janken Austero

RPTV

June 29
5:00 pm

Box score

TNT Tropang 5G 86, Rain or Shine Elasto Painters 107
Scoring by quarter: 15–33, 22–18, 20–33, 29–23
Pts: Oftana 16; Rebs: Galinato 10; Asts: Galinato 4	Pts: Asistio 24; Rebs: Datu 10; Asts: Asistio 6

Araneta Coliseum, Quezon City
Referees: Nol Quilinguen, Mike Flordeliza, Jerry Narandan, Aaron Cañete

RPTV

July 2
7:30 pm

Box score

TNT Tropang 5G 108, Rain or Shine Elasto Painters 92
Scoring by quarter: 22–28, 19–19, 39–22, 28–23
Pts: Heading 23; Rebs: Ganuelas-Rosser 11; Asts: Heading 6	Pts: Norwood 18; Rebs: Norwood 9 Asts: Caracut 7

SM Mall of Asia Arena, Pasay
Referees: Rommel Gruta, Mike Flordeliza, Jeffrey Tantay, James Paez

RPTV

July 4
5:00 pm

Box score

TNT Tropang 5G 97, Rain or Shine Elasto Painters 113
Scoring by quarter: 24–28, 28–28, 12–37, 33–20
Pts: Oftana 23; Rebs: Galinato, Ganuelas-Rosser 6 Asts: Heading 3	Pts: Mamuyac 22; Rebs: Clarito, Norwood 7 Asts: Clarito, Nocum 5

Araneta Coliseum, Quezon City
Referees: Nol Quilinguen, Rommel Gruta, Jerry Narandan, Cherwill Solon

RPTV

July 6
7:30 pm

Box score

TNT Tropang 5G 97, Rain or Shine Elasto Painters 89
Scoring by quarter: 28–27, 19–23, 22–20, 28–19
Pts: Heading 29; Rebs: Khobuntin 12; Asts: Heading, Oftana 4	Pts: Tiongson 30; Rebs: Santillan 8 Asts: three players 3
TNT wins series, 4–2

Araneta Coliseum, Quezon City
Referees: Nol Quilinguen, Rommel Gruta, Mike Flordeliza, Jeffrey Tantay

== Finals ==
RPTV

July 13
7:30 pm

Box score

San Miguel Beermen 96, TNT Tropang 5G 99

Araneta Coliseum, Quezon City

RPTV

July 16
7:30 pm

Box score

San Miguel Beermen 98, TNT Tropang 5G 92

Araneta Coliseum, Quezon City

RPTV

July 18
7:30 pm

Box score

San Miguel Beermen 108, TNT Tropang 5G 88

Araneta Coliseum, Quezon City

RPTV

July 20
7:30 pm

Box score

San Miguel Beermen 105, TNT Tropang 5G 91

SM Mall of Asia Arena, Pasay

RPTV

July 23
7:30 pm

Box score

San Miguel Beermen 78, TNT Tropang 5G 86

Araneta Coliseum, Quezon City

RPTV

July 25
7:30 pm

Box score

San Miguel Beermen 107, TNT Tropang 5G 96
San Miguel wins series, 4–2

PhilSports Arena, Pasig

== Awards ==
=== Player of the Week ===
Week	Player	Ref.
April 4–6	Bong Quinto (Meralco Bolts)	
April 9–16	Zavier Lucero (Magnolia Chicken Timplados Hotshots)	
April 23–27	Leonard Santillan (Rain or Shine Elasto Painters)	
April 30 – May 5	Justine Baltazar (Converge FiberXers)	
May 7–11	Calvin Oftana (TNT Tropang 5G)	
May 14–18	Leonard Santillan (Rain or Shine Elasto Painters)	
May 21–25	Chris Newsome (Meralco Bolts)	
May 28 – June 1	Chris Newsome (Meralco Bolts)	
June 4–8	Robert Bolick (NLEX Road Warriors)	
June 11–15	Zavier Lucero (Magnolia Chicken Timplados Hotshots)	
June 18–22	Jhonard Clarito (Rain or Shine Elasto Painters)	
June 25–29	Calvin Oftana (TNT Tropang 5G)	
July 2–6	Jordan Heading (TNT Tropang 5G)	

== Statistics ==
=== Individual statistical leaders ===
Category	Player	Team	Statistic
Points per game	CJ Perez	San Miguel Beermen	23.4
Rebounds per game	June Mar Fajardo	San Miguel Beermen	13.1
Assists per game	Robert Bolick	NLEX Road Warriors	7.2
Steals per game	Joshua Munzon	NorthPort Batang Pier	1.9
Blocks per game	Poy Erram	TNT Tropang 5G	1.7
Turnovers per game	Louie Sangalang	Terrafirma Dyip	3.6
Fouls per game	Cliff Hodge	Meralco Bolts	4.2
Minutes per game	Robert Bolick	NLEX Road Warriors	38.5
FG%	JM Calma	San Miguel Beermen	73.7%
FT%	RK Ilagan	Blackwater Bossing	92.3%
3FG%	RK Ilagan	Blackwater Bossing	55.6%
4FG%	Paul Lee	Magnolia Chicken Timplados Hotshots	50.0%
Double-doubles	June Mar Fajardo	San Miguel Beermen	21

=== Individual game highs ===
Category	Player	Team	Statistic
Points	Jason Perkins	Phoenix Fuel Masters	39
Points	Calvin Oftana	TNT Tropang 5G	39
Rebounds	June Mar Fajardo	San Miguel Beermen	23
Assists	Scottie Thompson	Barangay Ginebra San Miguel	13
Steals	five players		5
Blocks	Japeth Aguilar	Barangay Ginebra San Miguel	5
Blocks	Brandon Ganuelas-Rosser (twice)	TNT Tropang 5G	5
Three point field goals	three players		6
Four point field goals	Paul Lee	Magnolia Chicken Timplados Hotshots	4

=== Team statistical leaders ===
Category	Team	Statistic
Points per game	San Miguel Beermen	108.0
Rebounds per game	Converge FiberXers	53.5
Assists per game	Barangay Ginebra San Miguel	25.2
Steals per game	NorthPort Batang Pier	9.5
Blocks per game	Meralco Bolts	5.3
Turnovers per game	NorthPort Batang Pier	16.0
Turnovers per game	Phoenix Fuel Masters	16.0
Fouls per game	Meralco Bolts	27.1
FG%	San Miguel Beermen	48.1%
FT%	Magnolia Chicken Timplados Hotshots	77.0%
3FG%	TNT Tropang 5G	36.2%
4FG%	Magnolia Chicken Timplados Hotshots	44.3%

== Final rankings ==
Pos	Team	Pld	W	L	Best finish
1	San Miguel Beermen (C)	25	17	8	Champion
2	TNT Tropang 5G	25	14	11	Runner-up
3	Barangay Ginebra San Miguel	19	12	7	Semifinalist
4	Rain or Shine Elasto Painters	19	10	9	Semifinalist
5	NLEX Road Warriors	13	8	5	Quarterfinalist
6	Magnolia Chicken Timplados Hotshots	13	8	5	Quarterfinalist
7	Converge FiberXers	12	7	5	Quarterfinalist
8	Meralco Bolts	12	6	6	Quarterfinalist
9	Phoenix Fuel Masters	11	4	7	Elimination round
10	Blackwater Bossing	11	2	9	Elimination round
11	NorthPort Batang Pier	11	2	9	Elimination round
12	Terrafirma Dyip	11	1	10	Elimination round

Rules for classification: 1) finals result, 2) elimination round seed of semifinalists, 3) elimination round seed of quarterfinalists, 4) elimination round finish
(C) Champions
