= Zavier Lucero =

Filipino-American basketball player (born 1999)

No. 22 – Magnolia Chicken Timplados Hotshots
- Position: Power forward
- League: PBA

Personal information
- Born: April 5, 1999 (age 27) Vallejo, California, U.S.
- Listed height: 6 ft 6 in (1.98 m)
- Listed weight: 205 lb (93 kg)

Career information
- High school: Angelo Rodriguez (Fairfield, California)
- College: Cal State Maritime (2017–2020); UP (2021–2022)
- PBA draft: 2023: 1st round, 5th overall pick
- Drafted by: NorthPort Batang Pier

Career history
- 2023–2024: NorthPort Batang Pier
- 2024–present: Magnolia Chicken Timplados Hotshots

Career highlights
- PBA Mythical Second Team (2024–25); PBA Defensive Player of the Year (2025); PBA All-Defensive Team (2024–25); PBA All-Star (2026); UAAP champion (2021); UAAP Mythical Team (2021)

Zavier Vicente Lucero (born April 5, 1999) is a Filipino-American professional basketball player for the Magnolia Chicken Timplados Hotshots of the Philippine Basketball Association (PBA). After playing for Cal State Maritime, he won a title in college with the UP Fighting Maroons. He is also known by his nickname "The Zavior" knack for delivering crucial plays in important moments, particularly during close games.

== Early life and high school career ==
Lucero's mother is Filipino while his father is Mexican-American. His name was originally supposed to be "Savior", as the family gained some stability on the year he was born.

Lucero played for Rodriguez High School. In his junior year, Lucero was nominated for an All-State selection, averaging 17.6 points per game, and was named the MVP of the Monticello Empire League.

== College career ==
=== Cal State Maritime (2017–2020) ===
Lucero played three years for Cal State Maritime. After winning the Freshman of the Year Award, in his junior year, he led the team with 19.4 points and 10.2 rebounds per game, earning NAIA Division II All-American Honorable Mention Team honors as the team finished with a record of 20–9. He made the All-Cal Pac Conference First Team in all three years with averages of 15 points on 49.3% shooting and 8.3 rebounds, and also became the program's all-time leading scorer with 1,262 points. He graduated with a degree in International Business and Logistics in 2021.

=== UP (2021–2022) ===
In 2020, Lucero joined a scrimmage held by Fil-Am Nation. After impressing in the scrimmage, he received interest from four universities in the Philippines. On February 17, 2022, he committed to the UP Fighting Maroons with two years of eligibility, and enrolled in a master's degree.

==== Rookie season: UAAP champion ====
Lucero made his UAAP debut in Season 84. After struggling in his first game in a loss to the Ateneo Blue Eagles, he bounced back in a win over the UST Growling Tigers with 18 points and eight rebounds. UP then won six straight games to finish the first round of eliminations with a 6–1 record. In that stretch, he led the league in scoring and was second-best in field goal percentage with 15.3 points a game on 62.3% shooting. He also averaged 8.3 rebounds, two steals, and 1.9 assists. In his next three games however, his numbers dipped to just 7.3 points on 36% shooting. He was then able to snap out of his slump with 20 points, 14 rebounds, three assists, and three blocks in a win over the UE Red Warriors. UP finished the elimination rounds with a 12–2 record in second place, winning its last four games.

UP made the finals that year against Ateneo. In Game 1, he had 17 points, 13 rebounds, and two blocks, and made a clutch and-one play as UP won in overtime. However, in Game 2, Ateneo extended the series as he was limited to just eight points with three turnovers. Although he didn't score in Game 3, his teammates stepped up for him and UP won its first title in 36 years. For the season, he made the UAAP's Mythical Team.

==== Final season: Runner-up finish ====
Lucero returned for one more season with UP in Season 85. He averaged 11.4 points, 5.3 rebounds, 1.9 assists, and 1.4 steals as UP had a chance to go for back-to-back titles. In Game 1 of the finals, once again against Ateneo, he had two game-changing blocks. First, he denied a Chris Koon dunk that gave UP momentum in the fourth quarter, then he had a block on Ange Kouame to prevent the game from becoming a one-possession lead as UP eventually won 72–66. The following game, he injured his knee during the fourth quarter as he was driving to the basket. Without him, UP lost Game 2. An MRI later revealed that he had torn his ACL as well as his meniscus, and would not be available for Game 3. Although UP lost Game 3 and the championship, he got to shoot a technical free throw in the closing seconds of that game for his final moment in the UAAP.

== Professional career ==
=== NorthPort Batang Pier (2023–2024) ===
On September 9, 2023, Lucero declared for the PBA season 48 draft held that year. He was drafted fifth overall by the NorthPort Batang Pier, and signed a two-year deal with them.

Lucero sat out the 2023–24 Commissioner's Cup, rehabbing from his ACL injury in the States and gaining 30 lbs. He made his PBA debut during the 2024 Philippine Cup with 13 points, eight rebounds, and four blocks in a loss to the NLEX Road Warriors. He scored a conference-high 18 points with seven rebounds in a loss to the Magnolia Chicken Timplados Hotshots. They did not make the playoffs during that conference. For the conference, he averaged 12 points, five rebounds, two assists, a steal, and a block per game on 47% shooting from the field, 26% from three, and 71% from the free throw line.

=== Magnolia Chicken Timplados Hotshots (2024–present) ===
On July 15, 2024, Lucero was traded to the Magnolia Chicken Timplados Hotshots in exchange for Jio Jalalon and Abu Tratter. In his first five games with his new team during the 2024 Governors' Cup, he averaged 15.2 points, 8.2 rebounds, one assist, and 1.6 blocks in just under 30 minutes per game, becoming one of the leading local scorers of the team. They made the quarterfinals that conference with a win over his former team in which he had 16 points and 12 rebounds. In Game 3 of the quarterfinals against the Rain or Shine Elasto Painters, he suffered a concussion, causing him to miss the next two games. Although Magnolia won Game 4, they were eliminated in Game 5, losing the series 3–2.

Near the end of the 2024–25 Commissioner's Cup, Magnolia was 3–6, with Lucero averaging less minutes and coming off the bench although he averaged 12.3 points on 49.3% shooting, 5.8 rebounds and 1.6 assists per in nine games played. Against the Phoenix Fuel Masters, he led the team to a much-needed with 25 points and five rebounds to get into ninth. He then contributed 20 points in a win over guest team Hong Kong Eastern, making it back-to-back wins for Magnolia. In the last game of the elimination round against the Meralco Bolts, he contributed 22 points and made all four of his three-pointers for Meralco to finish with a 6–6 record. Since they had the same record as NLEX, they faced off in a play-in match, which they were able to win to secure the last slot in the quarterfinals. For leading Magnolia to the playoffs, he won Player of the Week. In the quarterfinals, he faced his former team NorthPort. Needing only one win to enter the semis, NorthPort was able to beat Magnolia in this round.

Magnolia was able to start the 2025 Philippine Cup with a win over the Blackwater Bossing, in which Lucero had 21 points and seven rebounds. He then had 24 points, seven rebounds, and two blocks in a win over the San Miguel Beermen. In Magnolia's first five games, all wins, he raised his averages to 19.4 points, 7.8 rebounds, 2.0 assists and 1.2 steals while playing the most minutes on the team. They were able to win a six straight against Meralco. However, during that game, Meralco's Cliff Hodge took him down head-first to stop a fast break, leading to a flagrant foul called on Hodge and both teams’ benches being cleared, with coaches and team officials also getting involved. Hodge was then suspended for one game and fined ₱100,000. Magnolia's winning streak ended with a loss to Rain or Shine. In the last game of the elimination round, against the TNT Tropang 5G, he led with 24 points on 9-of-13 shooting, adding eight rebounds, five assists, three blocks and a block as Magnolia finished at 8–3 for the third seed. This performance earned him one more Player of the Week award. Despite having a twice-to-beat advantage, they lost both their games to TNT, ending their conference once again in the quarterfinals. For the season, he was awarded as the league's Defensive Player of the Year, averaging 14.9 points, 6.9 rebounds, and 1.2 blocks as he ranked within the top 10 in rebounds and blocks and made Magnolia the best defensive team in the league. He also made the Mythical Second Team and All-Defense Team.

== PBA career statistics ==
Legend
| GP | Games played | MPG | Minutes per game | FG% | Field-goal percentage |
| 3FG% | 3-point field-goal percentage | 4P% | 4-point field-goal percentage | FT% | Free-throw percentage |
| RPG | Rebounds per game | APG | Assists per game | SPG | Steals per game |
| BPG | Blocks per game | PPG | Points per game | 127 | Career high |

As of the end of 2025–26 season

==== Season-by-season averages ====
| Year | Team | GP | MPG | FG% | 3P% | 4P% | FT% | RPG | APG | SPG | BPG | PPG |
|---|---|---|---|---|---|---|---|---|---|---|---|---|
| 2023–24 | NorthPort | 12 | 26.9 | .471 | .258 | — | .714 | 5.4 | 2.0 | 1.2 | 1.0 | 12.1 |
| 2024–25 | Magnolia | 39 | 29.0 | .516 | .398 | .250 | .746 | 6.9 | 1.7 | .6 | 1.2 | 14.9 |
| 2025–26 | Magnolia | 38 | 36.0 | .501 | .343 | .000 | .748 | 8.8 | 1.8 | 1.1 | 1.7 | 15.5 |
| Career | | 89 | 31.7 | .504 | .356 | .167 | .744 | 7.5 | 1.8 | .9 | 1.4 | 14.8 |
