= PBA Defensive Player of the Year award =

The Philippine Basketball Association (PBA) Defensive Player of the Year is an annual Philippine Basketball Association (PBA) award given since the 1993 PBA season to the top defensive player of the season. Unlike the traditional player awards, which is given by the league, this citation is awarded by the PBA Press Corps.

Since its inception, the award has been given to 21 individuals. Zavier Lucero of the Magnolia Chicken Timplados Hotshots will be honored with his first Defensive Player of the Year award from the PBA Press Corps (PBAPC).

== Winners ==
^	Denotes player who is still active in the PBA
*	Inducted into the PBA Hall of Fame
Player (X)	Denotes the number of times the player has received the award
Team (X)	Denotes the number of times a player from this team has won

Season	Player	Position	Country of birth	Team	Ref.
1993	Alvin Teng	Center / Power forward	Philippines	San Miguel Beermen	
1994	Jerry Codiñera	Center	Philippines	Purefoods Tender Juicy Hotdogs	
1995	Art dela Cruz	Small forward	Philippines	San Miguel Beermen (2)	
1996	Marlou Aquino	Center	Philippines	Ginebra San Miguel	
1997	Freddie Abuda	Power forward	Philippines	San Miguel Beermen (3)	
1998	Chris Jackson	Power forward	United States	Formula Shell Zoom Masters	
1999	Chris Jackson (2)	Power forward	United States	Shell Velocity (2)	
2000	Freddie Abuda (2)	Power forward	Philippines	San Miguel Beermen (4)	
2001	Chris Jackson (3)	Power forward	United States	Shell Turbo Chargers (3)	
2002	Davonn Harp	Center	United States	Red Bull Thunder	
2003	Rudy Hatfield	Power forward / Small forward	Philippines	Coca-Cola Tigers	
2004–05	Dennis Espino	Center / Power forward	Philippines	Sta. Lucia Realtors	
2005–06	Marc Pingris	Power forward	Philippines	Purefoods Chunkee Giants (2)	
2006–07	Wynne Arboleda	Point guard	Philippines	Air21 Express	
2007–08	Arwind Santos	Small forward / Power forward	Philippines	Air21 Express (2)	
2008–09	Wynne Arboleda (2)	Point guard	Philippines	Burger King Whoppers (3)	
2009–10	Gabe Norwood	Small forward	United States	Rain or Shine Elasto Painters	
2010–11	Arwind Santos (2)	Small forward / Power forward	Philippines	Petron Blaze Boosters (5)	
2011–12	Jireh Ibañes	Small forward	Philippines	Rain or Shine Elasto Painters (2)	
2012–13	Marc Pingris (2)	Power forward	Philippines	San Mig Coffee Mixers (3)	
2013–14	Marc Pingris (3)	Power forward	Philippines	San Mig Super Coffee Mixers (4)	
2014–15	June Mar Fajardo^	Center	Philippines	San Miguel Beermen (6)	
2015–16	Chris Ross^	Point guard / Shooting guard	Philippines	San Miguel Beermen (7)	
2016–17	Chris Ross^ (2)	Point guard / Shooting guard	Philippines	San Miguel Beermen (8)	
2017–18	Poy Erram^	Center	Philippines	Blackwater Elite	
2019	Sean Anthony	Power forward	Philippines	NorthPort Batang Pier	
2020 (Note: The 2020 season only had one conference. The award was renamed as "Top Bubble D-Fender" for this season.)	Justin Chua^	Center	Philippines	Phoenix Super LPG Fuel Masters	
2021	Arwind Santos (3)	Power forward	Philippines	NorthPort Batang Pier (2)	
2022–23	Jio Jalalon^	Point guard	Philippines	Magnolia Chicken Timplados Hotshots (5)	
2023–24	Cliff Hodge^	Power forward	United States	Meralco Bolts	
2024–25	Zavier Lucero^	Power forward	United States	Magnolia Chicken Timplados Hotshots (6)	

== Multiple time winners ==
Total	Player
3	Chris Jackson
3	Marc Pingris
3	Arwind Santos
2	Freddie Abuda
2	Wynne Arboleda
2	Chris Ross
