= Joseph Eriobu =

Filipino-Nigerian basketball player

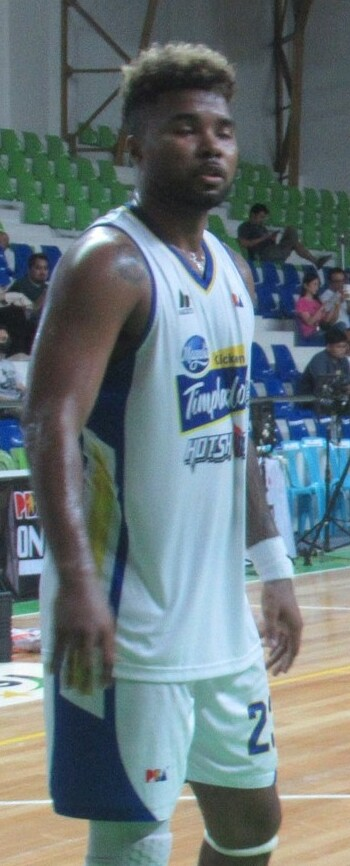
- Eriobu in 2023

No. 23 – Terrafirma Dyip
- Position: Small forward / power forward
- League: PBA

Personal information
- Born: February 12, 1992 (age 34) British Hong Kong
- Listed height: 6 ft 4 in (1.93 m)
- Listed weight: 198 lb (90 kg)

Career information
- College: NU (2010); Mapúa (2012–2016)
- PBA draft: 2016: 2nd round, 4th overall pick
- Drafted by: Mahindra Floodbuster
- Playing career: 2016–present

Career history
- 2016–2017: Mahindra Floodbuster
- 2017–2018: Phoenix Fuel Masters
- 2019: Blackwater Elite
- 2019: Winling
- 2019–2020: Hong Kong Eastern
- 2023–2025: Magnolia Chicken Timplados Hotshots
- 2025–present: Terrafirma Dyip
Medals
Men's 3x3 basketball
Representing Philippines
Southeast Asian Games
Silver medal – second place	2023 Phnom Penh	Team

Joseph Emmanuel Arinze Eriobu Jr. (born February 12, 1992) is a Filipino-Nigerian professional basketball player for the Terrafirma Dyip of the Philippine Basketball Association (PBA).

== Collegiate career ==
Eriobu first played for the NU Bulldogs at the University Athletic Association of the Philippines (UAAP) in Season 73 in 2010. He later to the Mapúa Cardinals in the National Collegiate Athletic Association (NCAA) in 2012. He sit out the Season 91 for academic reasons before returning in 2016 for Season 92.

== Professional career ==
Eriobu was a long-time player in the Philippine Basketball Association (PBA). He was drafted 4th overall by the Mahindra Floodbuster in the 2016 PBA draft. He would later play for the Phoenix Fuel Masters and Blackwater Elite before being left unsigned to any PBA team in 2019.

He would play for Hong Kong Eastern in the ASEAN Basketball League.

Eriobu would shift to 3x3, joining the Purefoods TJ Titans of the PBA 3x3 with the aim of eventually returning to the main 5x5 PBA league.

Following his good performance with the Magnolia Chicken Timplados Hotshots during the PBA on Tour pre-season games, he officially signed a one-year deal with the team on August 22, 2023. In August 2024, he was given a one-year contract extension by the team.

On December 10, 2025, Eriobu was traded back to the Terrafirma Dyip in exchange for the Terrafirma's second-round pick in 2028.

== National team ==
Eriobu has played for the Philippines men's national 3x3 team. His team finished as silver medalist at the 2023 SEA Games in Cambodia to the host's team reinfored by naturalized players. He will suit up for the team again at the 2025 SEA Games in Thailand.

== Personal life ==
Joseph Eriobu is a Filipino of Nigerian descent. Eriobu graduated from Mapua with a bachelor's degree in psychology in 2017. He is married and has a daughter.

== PBA career statistics ==
Legend
GP	Games played	MPG	Minutes per game	FG%	Field-goal percentage
3FG%	3-point field-goal percentage	4P%	4-point field-goal percentage	FT%	Free-throw percentage
RPG	Rebounds per game	APG	Assists per game	SPG	Steals per game
BPG	Blocks per game	PPG	Points per game	127	Career high

As of the end of 2025–26 season

=== Season-by-season averages ===
Year	Team	GP	MPG	FG%	3P%	4P%	FT%	RPG	APG	SPG	BPG	PPG
2016–17	Mahindra	28	14.2	.467	.050	—	.674	3.6	.4	.5	.1	6.6
2016–17	Phoenix	28	14.2	.467	.050	—	.674	3.6	.4	.5	.1	6.6
2017–18	Phoenix	19	8.8	.463	.111	—	.667	1.5	.3	.4	.1	3.7
2019	Blackwater	7	9.9	.406	.143	—	.700	3.0	.6	.6	—	4.9
2023–24	Magnolia	26	7.8	.444	.286	—	.600	.8	.3	.3	—	3.2
2024–25	Magnolia	23	6.0	.453	.304	.273	.733	1.5	.3	.0	—	4.0
2025–26	Magnolia	29	13.7	.410	.241	.375	.731	2.9	.7	.4	—	6.0
2025–26	Terrafirma	29	13.7	.410	.241	.375	.731	2.9	.7	.4	—	6.0
Career		132	10.4	.442	.223	.316	.686	2.2	.4	.3	.0	4.8
