= William Navarro =

Filipino-Greek basketball player (born 1997)

Free agent
- Position: Power forward / small forward

Personal information
- Born: February 3, 1997 (age 29) Athens, Greece
- Listed height: 1.93 m (6 ft 4 in)
- Listed weight: 91 kg (201 lb)

Career information
- College: San Beda; Ateneo
- PBA draft: 2020: Special round2nd overall pick (Note: The 2021 draft was composed of two drafts: the Gilas special round and the regular draft. Navarro was selected as the 2nd pick of the special draft.)
- Drafted by: NorthPort Batang Pier
- Playing career: 2022–present

Career history
- 2022–2025: NorthPort Batang Pier
- 2025: Magnolia Chicken Timplados Hotshots
- 2025–2026: Busan KCC Egis

Career highlights
- KBL champion (2026); 2× UAAP champion (2018, 2019); NCAA Philippines champion (2016)

William Raniel Navarro (born February 3, 1997) is a Filipino-Greek professional basketball player who last played for the Busan KCC Egis of the Korean Basketball League (KBL) and listed at 6 ft 4 in. He was born and raised in Athens, Greece.

Navarro first played for the junior team of Panathinaikos before playing in the Philippines for college. In college, he first played for the San Beda Red Lions before transferring to the Ateneo Blue Eagles in 2017. He won three titles playing college ball, one with San Beda in NCAA Season 92 (2016) and two with Ateneo in UAAP seasons 81 (2018) and 82 (2019).

In 2021, Navarro was selected by the NorthPort Batang Pier of the Philippine Basketball Association (PBA) with the second pick of the special round of the season 46 draft. He wouldn't start playing in the PBA until October 2022 when his contract with the Seoul Samsung Thunders fell through due to obligations with the Philippines national team.

In 2025, NorthPort traded Navarro to the Magnolia Chicken Timplados Hotshots. Later that year, he left the team and the league to join the KBL's Busan KCC Egis.

He has also represented the Philippines in international competitions.

== Early life ==
Navarro was born and raised in Athens, Greece, to Filipino parents, including his father, Randy, who works as a seaman in the country. His roots can be traced to Talisay, Batangas. He studied in Greece for high school, during which he played for the junior squad of Greek basketball club Panathinaikos.

== College career ==
In 2014, it was reported that Navarro had planned to play college basketball in the Philippines. In 2016, he debuted for San Beda College's Red Lions, where he won a championship as a freshman in NCAA Season 92.

Before the year ended, he transferred to Ateneo de Manila University's Blue Eagles, where he would spend the remainder of his college career. He won back-to-back titles with Ateneo in UAAP seasons 81 (2018) and 82 (2019).

== Professional career ==
=== Drafted by NorthPort and SBP controversy (2021–2022) ===
On January 23, 2021, Navarro declared for the PBA season 46 draft, forgoing his final year with Ateneo. Navarro was initially placed in the regular pool after he declined to join the special draft but changed his mind a month later. The Samahang Basketbol ng Pilipinas then added him as the final addition to the special draft, where he was picked second by the NorthPort Batang Pier.

On July 7, 2022, he signed a deal with the Seoul Samsung Thunders of the Korean Basketball League. However, on September 17, it was reported that the SBP and FIBA did not give him clearance to join the KBL due to existing obligations with Gilas Pilipinas. The move gained significant backlash, particularly with Filipino players who have also had stints abroad. Kai Sotto posted on social media that "we got our own people stopping us from achieving greatness." RJ Abarrientos called it "an impediment in someone's dream" while Justin Gutang added the hashtag "#FreeWill" on his post.

On September 22, Navarro wrote an apology on social media after meeting with SBP executive director Sonny Barrios, recognizing his existing contract with the federation and acknowledging the "misunderstanding and miscommunication caused by my signing up with the Samsung Thunders of Korea". The same day, his deal with Samsung fell through after the team signed Christian David as their Asian quota player instead.

=== NorthPort Batang Pier (2022–2025) ===
On October 24, 2022. Navarro signed a deal with NorthPort, making his PBA debut just two days later. He stated that between him and his manager, this was the best decision he could make and that he had already moved on from his failed move to the KBL. On December 15, he suffered an ACL tear which ruled him out for the remainder of the 2022–23 PBA season. Despite the injury, on July 6, 2023, he signed a new two-year deal with NorthPort. It wouldn't be until March 1, 2024, during the 2024 PBA Philippine Cup, when he would return from his injury.

=== Magnolia Chicken Timplados Hotshots (2025) ===
On May 27, 2025, Navarro was traded to the Magnolia Chicken Timplados Hotshots in exchange for Calvin Abueva, Jerrick Balanza, and a second-round draft pick in 2027 (season 51).

=== Busan KCC Egis (2025–2026) ===
On August 5, 2025, just over two months after getting traded to Magnolia, Navarro left the team and the PBA to sign with the Busan KCC Egis of the Korean Basketball League. Navarro was affected by a three-year ban rule that the PBA imposed on players with expiring contracts departing for other leagues. This delays a potential return to the Philippine league.

Navarro had limited minutes playing for Busan KCC Egis averaging 5.2 points, 2.5 rebounds, and 1.1 assists in 21 games. He last played for Busan on April 8, 2026, and was released on May 29, 2026

Navarro plans to return to the PBA and appeal his three-year ban. He targets to join the Titan Ultra Giant Risers after the PBA approved the transfer of signing rights of Navarro from Magnolia to Titan Ultra in exchange of Titan Ultra player Arvin Tolentino on June 16, 2026.
