= Titan Ultra Giant Risers =

Philippine professional basketball team

- 2025–26 Titan Ultra Giant Risers season
- Founded: 2025
- History: Titan Ultra Giant Risers (2025–present)
- Team colors: Black, gold, red, white
- Company: Pureblends Corporation
- Board governor: Bryann Calantoc; Emilio Tiu (alternate)
- Team manager: Jessica Arsolon
- Head coach: Rensy Bajar
- Team captain: Joshua Munzon
- Ownership: Bryann Calantoc

The Titan Ultra Giant Risers are a professional basketball team owned by Pureblends Corporation. The team competes in the Philippine Basketball Association (PBA), after the company acquired the former NorthPort Batang Pier franchise in October 2025. The team is named after Titan Ultra, a male dietary supplement.

== History ==
=== Formation ===
On September 3, 2025, Pureblends Corporation bought the NorthPort Batang Pier, a franchise owned by Sultan 900 Capital, for ₱90 million. Pureblends Corporation had previously backed teams in the regional Pilipinas Super League as well as in the Vietnam Basketball Association with the Ho Chi Minh City Wings. It is also the title sponsor of Mendiola F.C. in the Philippines Football League. As the acquisition still required approval from the PBA board, the team entered a transition period.

NorthPort still took part in the PBA season 50 draft on September 7, selecting Chris Koon and CJ Austria during the first two rounds of the draft. On September 20, Johnedel Cardel, who previously served as head coach of the Terrafirma Dyip, stepped in as the team's new head coach, replacing Bonnie Tan. The team also acquired free agents Von Pessumal and Aljun Melecio. Notably, Pureblends president Bryann Calantoc was present for Melecio's signing.

On September 25, PBA commissioner Willie Marcial announced that the acquisition was "almost a done deal" and that it could be completed by September 29. On September 30, the franchise sale of NorthPort was reportedly already approved.

On October 1, 2025, the acquisition was formally announced at a press conference with the name unveiled as the Titan Ultra Giant Risers. Pureblends took advantage of its entry in the middle of the PBA's 50th season to market a new product, Titan Ultra despite initial hesitations due to the nature of the supplementary pill brand.

== Team image ==
The Titan Ultra Giant Risers are named after Pureblends Corporation's men's dietary supplement which is believed to have ingredients which promote sexual function.

== Current roster ==
Titan Ultra Giant Risers roster
Players
Coaches

Pos.	#	POB	Name	Height	Weight	DOB (YYYY–MM–DD)	From
G	1	(Philippines)	RR Garcia	5 ft 11 in (1.80 m)	165 lb (75 kg)	1990–01–12	Far Eastern
G	3	(Philippines)	Fran Yu	5 ft 9 in (1.75 m)	154 lb (70 kg)	1998–06–16	Letran
G	4	(Philippines)	Bryan Sajonia (injured)	6 ft 0 in (1.83 m)		2000–07–04	San Beda
F	5	(Philippines)	Ato Ular	6 ft 4 in (1.93 m)	196 lb (89 kg)	1995–05–04	Letran
G	8	(Philippines)	Denzel Wong	5 ft 8 in (1.73 m)		1993–03–06	Asia Pacific
F/C	9	(Philippines)	Paolo Javillonar	6 ft 6 in (1.98 m)		2000–05–13	Letran
G	11	(Philippines)	Aljun Melecio	5 ft 8 in (1.73 m)	160 lb (73 kg)	1998–07–25	De La Salle
G	12	(Philippines)	Roi Sumang	5 ft 8 in (1.73 m)	160 lb (73 kg)	1990–12–12	UE
G	13	(Philippines)	John Amores	6 ft 2 in (1.88 m)	178 lb (81 kg)	1999–06–13	José Rizal
G/F	19	(Philippines)	Von Pessumal	6 ft 2 in (1.88 m)	185 lb (84 kg)	1993–02–12	Ateneo
F	21	(Philippines)	Aris Dionisio	6 ft 4 in (1.93 m)		1995–07–21	St. Clare
F	22	(Australia)	Cade Flores (injured)	6 ft 5 in (1.96 m)	214 lb (97 kg)	1998–09–29	Arellano
C	23	(Philippines)	Mark Omega (injured)	6 ft 5 in (1.96 m)		2000–08–26	Letran
G/F	24	(United States)	Joshua Munzon	6 ft 4 in (1.93 m)	200 lb (91 kg)	1995–01–15	Cal State LA
G	26	(Philippines)	Axel Iñigo	5 ft 9 in (1.75 m)		1994–04–22	Far Eastern
F	27	(Philippines)	King Caralipio	6 ft 2 in (1.88 m)	176 lb (80 kg)	1997–12–04	Letran
F	28	(Philippines)	Mark Sangco	6 ft 5 in (1.96 m)		1999–10–02	St. Benilde
C	–	(Philippines)	Mario Barasi	6 ft 8 in (2.03 m)		2000–08–09	Adamson
G	–	(Philippines)	James Martinez	5 ft 9 in (1.75 m)	170 lb (77 kg)	1987–01–31	UE

Head coach

- (Philippines) Raymond Valenzona

Assistant coach(es)

- (Philippines) Jerson Cabiltes (1st assistant)
- (Philippines) June Dizon
- (Philippines) Maverick Chua
- (Philippines) Mike Fermin
- (Philippines) Bonnie Tan (consultant)

Team manager

- (Philippines) Jessica Arsolon

Legend

- (C) Team captain
- (CI) Commissioner's Cup Import
- (GI) Governors' Cup Import
- (EI) EASL Import
- (DP) Unsigned draft pick
- (FA) Free agent
- (IN) Inactive
- (S) Suspended
- (R) Rookie
- Injured

Roster

== Season-by-season records ==
List of the last five conferences completed by the Titan Ultra franchise. For the full-season history, see List of Titan Ultra Giant Risers seasons.

Note: GP = Games played, W = Wins, L = Losses, W–L% = Winning percentage

Season	Conference	GP	W	L	W–L%	Finish	Playoffs
2025–26	Philippine	11	4	7	.364	9th	Did not qualify
2025–26	Commissioner's	12	2	10	.167	12th	Did not qualify
2025–26	Governors' Cup	12	2	10	.167	7th (Group A)	Did not qualify
An asterisk (*) indicates one-game playoff; two asterisks (**) indicates team with twice-to-beat advantage

Preceded by NorthPort Batang Pier	PBA franchise lineage 2025	Succeeded by current incarnation
