= Barangay Ginebra–TNT rivalry =

Philippine Basketball Association rivalry

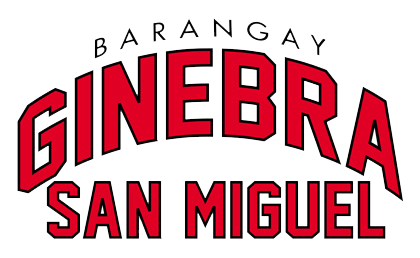
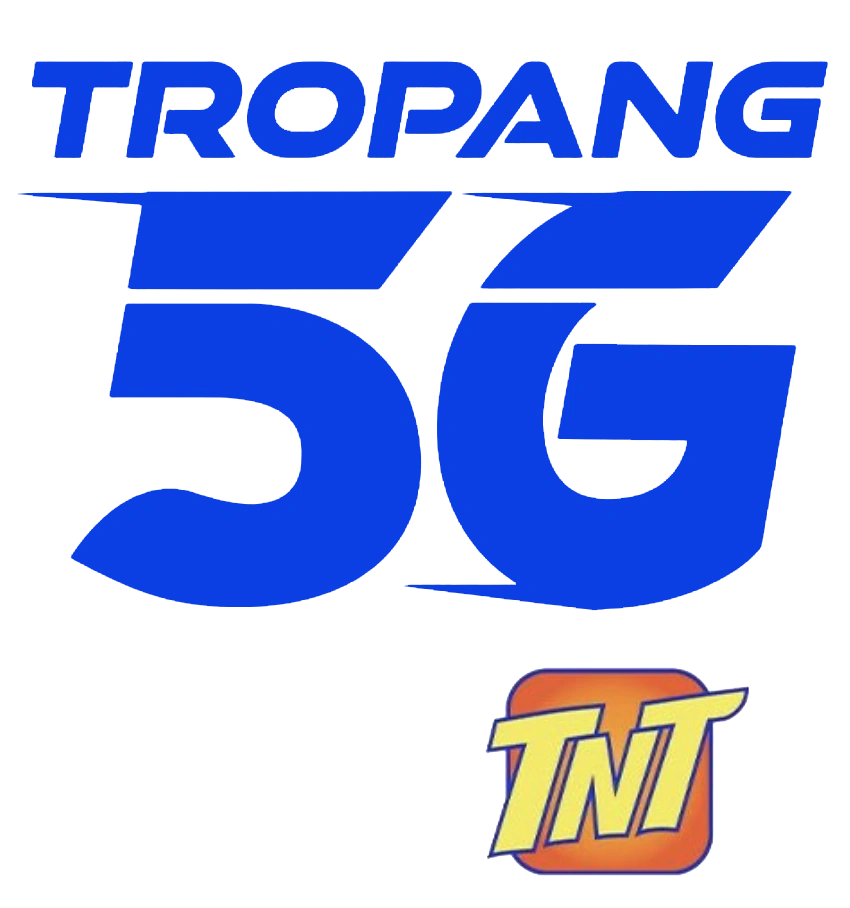
- Barangay Ginebra San Miguel TNT Tropang 5G
- First meeting: October 12, 2001; Talk 'N Text Phone Pals 81, Barangay Ginebra Kings 78
- Latest meeting: June 17, 2026; Barangay Ginebra 88, TNT 76, SM Mall of Asia Arena
- Next meeting: December 4, 2026

Statistics
- Total meetings: 140 (since 2001)
- Postseason results: 39–38 (Barangay Ginebra leads)
- Current win streak: Barangay Ginebra W1

Postseason history
PBA finals
- Series record: 4–3 (TNT leads)
- Win–loss record: 22–21 (TNT leads)
- 2004–05 PBA Philippine Cup Finals: Barangay Ginebra won, 4–2
- 2011 PBA Commissioner's Cup Finals: Talk 'N Text won, 4–2
- 2020 PBA Philippine Cup Finals: Barangay Ginebra won, 4–1
- 2023 PBA Governors' Cup Finals: TNT won, 4–2
- 2024 PBA Governors' Cup Finals: TNT won, 4–2
- 2024–25 PBA Commissioner's Cup Finals: TNT won, 4–3
- 2026 PBA Commissioner's Cup Finals: Barangay Ginebra won, 4–3
PBA Playoffs
- Series record: 7–6 (Barangay Ginebra leads)
- Win–loss record: 20–18 (Barangay Ginebra leads)
- 2004 PBA Fiesta Conference Semifinals: Barangay Ginebra won, 2–1
- 2006–07 PBA Philippine Cup Semifinals: Barangay Ginebra won, 4–2
- 2009–10 PBA Philippine Cup Quarterfinals: Barangay Ginebra won, 3–2
- 2011 Governors Cup Round Robin Semifinals: Talk 'N Text won, 1–0
- 2012 Governors Cup Round Robin Semifinals: Barangay Ginebra won, 1–0
- 2013 PBA Commissioner's Cup Semifinals: Barangay Ginebra won, 3–2
- 2014 PBA Commissioner's Cup Quarterfinals: Talk 'N Text won, 1-0
- 2014–15 PBA Philippine Cup Quarterfinals: Talk 'N Text won, 1–0
- 2017 PBA Commissioner's Cup Semifinals: TNT won, 3–1
- 2017 PBA Governors' Cup Semifinals: Barangay Ginebra won, 3–1
- 2019 PBA Commissioner's Cup Semifinals: TNT won, 3–1
- 2021 PBA Philippine Cup Quarterfinals: TNT won, 1–0
- 2021 PBA Governors' Cup Quarterfinals: Barangay Ginebra won, 2–0

The Barangay Ginebra–TNT rivalry is an PBA rivalry between the Barangay Ginebra San Miguel and the TNT Tropang 5G. It is an intense rivalry that often features contested games and debates among PBA fans on various social media platforms. It is a part of SMC–MVP rivalry since Ginebra is owned by San Miguel Corporation and TNT is part of the MVP Group. The rivalry has intensified in the 2010s and 2020s due to their numerous high-stakes playoff and Finals confrontations, particularly in import-laden conferences. It is characterized by the star power of both teams and the clash between Barangay Ginebra's massive, "Never-Say-Die" loyal fan base and TNT's consistent franchise excellence.

== History ==
The rivalry began when Pepsi Hotshots rebranded as Mobiline Cellulars, still under the control of the Lorenzos in 1996.

In 1999, the top seeded Mobiline, with Asi Taulava and had a twice-to-beat advantage, met the eighth-seeded Barangay Ginebra in the 1999 PBA All-Filipino Cup Quarterfinals in a David and Goliath situation.

The first game was won by Barangay Ginebra with 14 point deficit, forcing a do-or-die situation. The second game was a decisive game where it was tense match. Mobiline was up by double digits up until the late 3rd quarter, when the Kings managed to spark a run. True to its Never Say Die spirit after Robert Jaworski's departure, they erased the lead which was up until the final minutes, with both scoring in the 70s. In the last minute, the Kings and Cellulars traded fouls which causes freethrows on their sides, but Mobiline was up by 1 point.

In the final seconds, the inbound was made by Noli Locsin. He then passed the ball to Bal David and fires a shot with a second to spare while being off balanced, with Asi Taulava closely guarding him, and when the shot was into the hoop, the entire crowd celebrated as Bal David's shot was counted by the officials, thus eliminating the top-seeded Mobiline out of contention. Asi Taulava even cried following an upset loss to the Kings.

Mobiline's line of operations would be absorbed by Smart Communications, owned by Manny V. Pangilinan in 2001, and renamed the team to Talk 'N Text Phone Pals, thus spawning in a new rivalry.

=== Prelude ===
==== 2004 PBA Fiesta Conference ====
TNT met Barangay Ginebra in their first playoff meet in 2004 PBA Fiesta Conference.

==== 2004–05 PBA Philippine Cup finals ====
TNT and Barangay Ginebra met again in 2004-05 PBA Philippine Cup finals on January 30, 2005, which was their first Finals matchup. Game 1 was won by the Phone Pals. However, the PBA commissioner Noli Eala forfeited Game 1, 71–89 in favor of Barangay Ginebra since Asi Taulava, who was still suspended by the league, participated in the game.

4 days before the finals, January 26, 2005, Judge Rogelio Pizarro of the Quezon City Regional Trial Court Branch 222 issued a writ of preliminary mandatory injunction "commanding and directing" the PBA to allow Taulava "to play in the current All Filipino Conference and succeeding Conferences of the PBA" during the term of his contract. This was after Taulava passed citizenship papers that should've allowed him to play in the league; earlier, he was indefinitely suspended from playing after his Filipino citizenship was nullified (only Filipinos are allowed to play in the Philippine Cup).

The PBA Board of Governors refused to honor the court order, upholding Commissioner Noli Eala's suspension of Taulava after consultation with the league's legal counsel. Taulava's lawyer Ed Francisco charged Eala with giving the board wrong legal advice. Taulava did play at game 1, in which Talk 'N Text won easily 89–71. As Taulava was being introduced, the pro-Ginebra crowd jeered him as the outnumbered Talk 'N Text crowd greeted him with cheers, displaying placards with a message "Welcome Back!" Eala himself had considered quitting his commissioner's post as he received a phone call "to make sure that Asi Taulava be allowed to play". After the game, Barangay Ginebra filed a protest to the commissioner's office. Talk 'N Text intends to play Taulava for the entire duration of the series.

Barangay Ginebra reportedly indicated that the team may forfeit the finals series if Taulava continues to be allowed to play and game 1 won't be forfeited. The league has issued a motion for reconsideration on the court order, and Eala said that Talk 'N Text may face sanctions for violating league rules. In a board meeting on February 1, there was a "heated clash" between Eala and Talk 'N Text alternate representative Paul Gueco in which Gueco reportedly challenged Eala to make a decision on the Taulava case by himself and to tell Talk N Text what his decision was, a statement supported by board chairman Buddy Encarnado of the Sta. Lucia Realtors.

Talk 'N Text did not field Taulava in game 2 "in the interest of the Philippine Basketball Association and the public", even though Eala was filed of contempt charges, and Talk 'N Text's game 1 win was forfeited against Ginebra. The Gin Kings won against Talk 'N Text by one point, thanks to Eric Menk's last basket with 5.2 seconds left to play. Ginebra's defense disallowed an attempt from the Phone Pals, leading to the 2–0 series lead.

Francisco pointed out that new rules and regulations covering the eligibility of Filipino-foreign players such as Taulava, who was declared eligible by the PBA based on the Bureau of Immigration clearance and Department of Justice (DOJ) affirmation in 2001, cannot be subject to additional rules or conditions imposed retroactively and any such changes can only be applied prospectively. The DOJ, for its part, considered on intervening and seek a reversal of the court's ruling allowing the cager to play anew in the PBA despite the DOJ's findings that he is not a Filipino; although they won't intervene if the Court of Appeals would rule favorably on the justice department's petition seeking to lift an injunction against it issued by the Manila RTC on the separate issue of Taulava's deportation. DOJ Secretary Raul Gonzalez said that the rulings of the Quezon City and Manila RTC constitute "undue interference by the courts." Parañaque Congressman Eduardo Zialcita would seek a congressional inquiry into Eala's "continued defiance" on the court orders.

Negros Oriental Congressman Jacinto Paras asked the Games and Amusement Board (GAB) to investigate Eala for his "questionable and dictatorial acts" as the PBA is under the direct jurisdiction of the GAB. Meanwhile, the Phone Pals appealed to the Board of Governors to reverse Eala's prior decisions of forfeiting game 1 and for the reinstatement of Taulava. Meanwhile, with all of the publicity, the tournament scored the highest TV ratings in years, with ratings of at least 11% and an audience share of at least 17.4%.

The Barangay Ginebra won their 6th league championship with a 4–2 series victory over Talk 'N Text.

==== 2009–10 PBA Philippine Cup Quarterfinals ====
On February 5, 2010, Talk 'N Text walked out of the playing court with Barangay Ginebra leading 27–20 with a minute left in the first quarter after Ranidel de Ocampo was called for a flagrant foul against Ronald Tubid.

On February 9, 2010, The PBA fined Talk 'N Text over P1M for walking-out of playing court vs Ginebra. The Tropang Texters just became the recipient of the highest-ever penalty in the league's 35-year history. For walking out of the playing court and eventually forfeiting Game 4 of their quarterfinals series with Barangay Ginebra Kings.

==== 2011 PBA Commissioner's Cup finals ====
The Tropang Texters blew the game wide open in the third quarter after a tightly contested first half to lead the series 1–0. The Kings won Game 2 in a tight contest to tie the series, but the Tropang Texters won comfortably at Puerto Princesa to regain the series lead. Back in Metro Manila, the Tropang Texters won Game 4 after trailing by as much 17 points to move within a win away from the championship, but the Kings won Game 5 to extend the series. In a tightly contested Game 6, Talk 'N Text needed an overtime period to eliminate Ginebra to win their second consecutive PBA championship.

Game 1, Ginebra led early in the first quarter, erecting a 16–6 lead but Talk 'N Text scored on a 15–4 run to lead in the first quarter by one point. The Tropang Texters then had another 15–5 run gave them a 39–29 advantage but Ginebra made their own run at the final minutes of the second quarter, capped off by a three-point buzzer-beater by Mark Caguioa to put the Kings up by one point at halftime. At the start of the third quarter, Talk 'N Text limited the Kings to two field goals and scored 14 points to lead by nine points. Talk 'N Text's bench scored 39 points to prevent another Ginebra run to close out the game, with the Tropang Texters leading by as much as 22 at some point.

Game 2, Talk 'N Text led early in the game with Paul Harris, Ryan Reyes and Jayson Castro outscoring the entire Ginebra team 30–15 in the first quarter. Robert Labagala and John Wilson scored on hustle plays in the second quarter to give Ginebra the lead 47–46. In the third quarter, Ronald Tubid and Talk 'N Text assistant coach Aboy Castro had a verbal altercation but were separated after Tubid gave Jimmy Alapag a hard foul; Ranidel de Ocampo later scored a three-point shot to tie the game at 71–all. Wilson scored 16 points in the game, including a key three-point play in a Ginebra 9-point run to give them the lead 108–101. Talk 'N Text made a final run and had a chance to win the game, but Alapag missed his three-point shot as time expired.

Game 3, Ranidel de Ocampo scored two consecutive three-point shots to give Talk 'N Text a 57–49 lead at halftime. While Caguioa led Ginebra into tying the game at 47–all, De Ocampo, Alapag and Larry Fonacier scored on five more three-point shots to extend Talk 'N Text's lead; Alapag's last three-pointer extended the Tropang Texters' lead to 12 points with 3:49 left in the game. Harvey Carey and Castro scored against the Ginebra defense to give the Tropang Texters an unassailable 18-point lead.

Game 4, Ginebra erected a 49–36 lead at halftime then extended it to a 55–38 lead early in the third quarter after a JC Intal three-point shot with 10:44 left in the third quarter. Talk 'N Text then had a 24–7 run led by Harris, de Ocampo and Castro, who converted on a jump shot to give the Tropang Texters the lead, 83–77, with 2:16 left in the game. The Kings would not recover and they trailed the series, 3–1.

Game 5, Both teams figured in a low-scoring first half, with Ginebra holding a 39–38 lead. The Kings started the third quarter with a 9–0 run to extend their lead to ten; Castro scored five points in a 9–2 Talk 'N Text run to cut the lead to one, 58–57. Castro kept the Tropang Texters in the game, but Ginebra broke a 62–all deadlock with a run to lead 70–66 at the end of the third quarter. Castro scored nine more points but Ginebra kept the lead; with the Kings holding a 95–90 lead, the Tropang Texters turned over the ball, which led to a Mike Cortez three-point shot that gave Ginebra an unassailable 98–90 lead.

Game 6, Ginebra had an 81–65 lead early in the fourth quarter when Talk 'N Text had an 11–0 run as they cut the lead to four points with 5:35 left. Down by two points in the final seconds of the fourth quarter, Alapag drove to the basket and scored a lay-up to tie the game. On the ensuing possession, Labagala also drove to the basket but missed on a floater to send the game into overtime. De Ocampo, Alapag and Castro scored three-point shots to give the Tropang Texters the lead 97–93 when Wilson scored his own three-pointer to cut the lead to one point with 58.3 seconds left in overtime. After Alapag scored on two free throws, Caguioa missed on a difficult three-pointer and Willie Miller turned the ball over as time expired.

Alapag and Castro were named finals co-MVPs for the second consecutive conference.

The Talk 'N Text Tropang Texters won their fourth and first back-to-back championship, defeating the Barangay Ginebra Kings, 4–2.

=== Rivalry erupted ===
==== 2020 PBA Philippine Cup finals ====
This was the first time that the two teams met in the Philippine Cup finals since the 2004–05 season when Barangay Ginebra won the championship against Talk 'N Text, four games to two.

Barangay Ginebra defeated TNT, four games to one, to win the franchise's fourth Philippine Cup (13 years after their last Philippine Cup championship in 2007) and their 13th title overall. LA Tenorio was named the Finals MVP.

==== 2023 PBA Governors' Cup finals ====
The TNT Tropang Giga and the Barangay Ginebra San Miguel competed for the 21st Governors' Cup championship and the 133rd overall championship contested by the league. This was the first time that TNT and Barangay Ginebra competed for the Governors' Cup championship. The last time that these 2 teams met in the finals was on the 2020 PBA Philippine Cup where Barangay Ginebra defeated TNT in 5 games, 4–1.

Prior to game 4, Barangay Ginebra's Christian Standhardinger was awarded his second Best Player of the Conference award, while TNT's Rondae Hollis-Jefferson was awarded the Best Import of the Conference award.

TNT defeated Barangay Ginebra in six games to win their first Governors' Cup in franchise history. Mikey Williams was named the finals' MVP.

==== 2024 PBA Governors' Cup finals ====
The TNT Tropang Giga and the Barangay Ginebra San Miguel competed for the 22nd Governors' Cup championship and the 136th overall championship contested by the league. It was the rematch of the previous Governors' Cup finals.

Prior to game 4, San Miguel's June Mar Fajardo was awarded his eleventh Best Player of the Conference award, extending his record for most career BPC awards, while TNT's Rondae Hollis-Jefferson was awarded his second Best Import of the Conference award.

TNT defeated Barangay Ginebra in six games to win their second straight Governors' Cup. Jayson Castro was named the finals' MVP.

==== 2024–25 PBA Commissioner's Cup finals ====
The TNT Tropang Giga and the Barangay Ginebra San Miguel competed for the 22nd Commissioner's Cup championship and the 137th overall championship contested by the league. This was the second straight finals matchup between TNT and Barangay Ginebra where the Tropang Giga won the 2024 PBA Governors' Cup championship in 6 games, 4–2. It was also their first Commissioner's Cup finals matchup since the 2011 PBA Commissioner's Cup where TNT, then known as the Talk 'N Text Tropang Texters, defeated Barangay Ginebra in 6 games, 4–2.

Prior to game 4, NorthPort Batang Pier's Arvin Tolentino was awarded his first Best Player of the Conference award, while TNT's Rondae Hollis-Jefferson was awarded his third Best Import of the Conference award.

TNT defeated Barangay Ginebra in seven games to win their second straight championship. Rey Nambatac was named the finals' MVP.

== Players who played for both teams ==
=== Local ===
- Willie Miller
- KG Canaleta
- Jared Dillinger
- John Ferriols
- Kevin Ferrer
- Troy Rosario
- Raymond Aguilar
- Japeth Aguilar
- Jimbo Aquino
- Norbert Torres
- Victor Pablo
- Dylan Ababou
- Rich Alvarez
- KG Canaleta
- Gec Chia
- Alex Crisano
- Rey Cuenco
- Yousef Taha
- Rob Labagala
- Yancy de Ocampo
- Elmer Espiritu
- Gilbert Lao
- Noli Locsin
- Dave Marcelo
- Vergel Meneses
- Sidney Onwubere
- Allan Salangsang
- Andy Seigle
- Manny Victorino

=== Import ===
- Silas Mills
- Jerald Honeycutt
- Paul Harris
- Othyus Jeffers

== Accolades ==
- 2024–25 PBA season Game of the season award: 2024–25 PBA Commissioner's Cup Finals Game 7
