= 2026 PBA Commissioner's Cup =

Second conference of the 2025–26 PBA season

- Duration: March 11 – June 17, 2026
- TV partner(s): RPTV; PBA Rush (HD)
- Streaming partner(s): Cignal Play; Pilipinas Live; One Sports YouTube Channel

Finals
- Champions: Barangay Ginebra San Miguel
- Runners-up: TNT Tropang 5G

Awards
- Best Player: RJ Abarrientos (Barangay Ginebra San Miguel)
- Best Import: Justin Brownlee (Barangay Ginebra San Miguel)
- Finals MVP: Scottie Thompson (Barangay Ginebra San Miguel)

PBA Commissioner's Cup chronology
- < 2024–25

PBA conference chronology
- < 2025–26 Philippine Cup 2026 Governors' Cup >

The 2026 PBA Commissioner's Cup, also referred to as the PBA season 50 Commissioner's Cup, was the second conference of the 2025–26 PBA season of the Philippine Basketball Association (PBA). The 23rd edition of the Commissioner's Cup started on March 11 and ended on June 17, 2026. The tournament allowed teams to hire foreign players or imports with unlimited height limit. The Macau Black Knights joined the conference as a guest team. A break was held from April 1 to 4 to make way for the observance of the Holy Week.

The TNT Tropang 5G were the defending Commissioner's Cup champions. Barangay Ginebra San Miguel defeated TNT in 7 games in a rematch of the last year's finals.

== Format ==
- All participating teams played in a single round-robin elimination, with each team playing 12 games throughout the duration of the conference.
- Teams were ranked by win-loss records with the top eight teams advancing to the playoffs. Any ties were broken using tiebreaker criteria.
  - As previously said last conference, the 8th seed playoff was scrapped, and is instead replaced by tiebreakers.
- The playoff format is as follows:
- Quarterfinals: Before this change, 1 and 2 have twice to beat against 7 and 8. 3-6 seeds go head-to-head in best of 3 series. This was changed where it patterns the previous conference, where higher seeds (1-4) have twice-to-beat advantage against lower seeds (5-8):
  - QF1: #1 vs #8
  - QF2: #2 vs #7
  - QF3: #3 vs #6
  - QF4: #4 vs #5
- Semifinals (best-of-seven series):
  - SF1: QF1 winner vs. QF4 winner
  - SF2: QF2 winner vs. QF3 winner
- Finals (best-of-seven series)
  - F1: SF1 winner vs SF2 winner

== Elimination round ==
=== Team standings ===
Pos	Team	W	L	PCT	GB	Qualification
1	NLEX Road Warriors	10	2	.833	—	Twice-to-beat in the quarterfinals
2	Barangay Ginebra San Miguel	9	3	.750 (Note: Head-to-head record: Barangay Ginebra 1–0 Rain or Shine)	1	Twice-to-beat in the quarterfinals
3	Rain or Shine Elasto Painters	9	3	.750	1	Twice-to-beat in the quarterfinals
4	Meralco Bolts	8	4	.667	2	Twice-to-beat in the quarterfinals
5	Magnolia Chicken Timplados Hotshots	7	5	.583 (Note: Head-to-head record: Magnolia 1–0 San Miguel)	3	Twice-to-win in the quarterfinals
6	San Miguel Beermen	7	5	.583	3	Twice-to-win in the quarterfinals
7	Phoenix Super LPG Fuel Masters	6	6	.500 (Note: Head-to-head record: Phoenix Super LPG 1–0 TNT)	4	Twice-to-win in the quarterfinals
8	TNT Tropang 5G	6	6	.500	4	Twice-to-win in the quarterfinals
9	Converge FiberXers	5	7	.417	5	
10	Terrafirma Dyip	4	8	.333	6	
11	Macau Black Knights (G)	3	9	.250	7	
12	Titan Ultra Giant Risers	2	10	.167 (Note: Head-to-head record: Titan Ultra 1–0 Blackwater)	8	
13	Blackwater Bossing	2	10	.167	8	

Source: PBA.ph
Rules for classification: 1) winning percentage; 2) head-to-head goal average (quotient); 3) head-to-head record; 4) overall quotient; 5) coin toss
(G) Guests

=== Results table ===
Team	Game											
Team	1	2	3	4	5	6	7	8	9	10	11	12
Barangay Ginebra (BGSM)	MAC; 110–93	NLEX; 113–118	CON; 99–93	SMB; 82–85	MAG; 91–89	PHX; 109–96	TER; 111–103	BWB; 115–108	TGR; 119–107	MER; 91–112	ROS; 114–90	TNT; 93–86
Blackwater (BWB)	NLEX; 81–84	TER; 88–99	MAG; 97–91	ROS; 95–151	TGR; 98–102	TNT; 94–99	PHX; 108–125	SMB; 126–120	BGSM; 108–115	MAC; 119–123	MER; 93–108	CON; 122–136
Converge (CON)	MAC; 102–94	TER; 100–111*	MER; 88–109	SMB; 99–103	BGSM; 93–99	ROS; 111–120	TGR; 103–82	MAG; 94–106	TNT; 97–92	PHX; 130–103	NLEX; 81–100	BWB; 136–122
Macau (MAC)	CON; 94–102	ROS; 109–116	BGSM; 93–110	MAG; 109–121	SMB; 94–110	MER; 110–115	NLEX; 97–106	TGR; 119–107	TNT; 112–119	BWB; 123–119	TER; 84–102	PHX; 105–98
Magnolia (MAG)	PHX; 98–101	NLEX; 105–112	BWB; 91–97	MAC; 121–109	TER; 85–70	BGSM; 89–91	SMB; 120–101	CON; 106–94	ROS; 82–91	TGR; 135–98	TNT; 106–94	MER; 93–76
Meralco (MER)	CON; 109–88	PHX; 93–86	ROS; 102–109	TGR; 118–105	TNT; 110–106	MAC; 115–110	NLEX; 101–104*	SMB; 92–103	BGSM; 112–91	BWB; 108–93	TER; 113–69	MAG; 76–93
NLEX	BWB; 84–81	MAG; 112–105	TNT; 97–103	BGSM; 118–113	PHX; 120–102	MAC; 106–97	MER; 104–101*	SMB; 94–98	TER; 95–85	ROS; 92–90	CON; 100–81	TGR; 123–112*
Phoenix Super LPG (PHX)	MAG; 101–98	TGR; 109–76	MER; 86–93	TER; 133–105	NLEX; 102–120	BGSM; 96–109	BWB; 125–108	ROS; 87–83	CON; 103–130	TNT; 100–97*	MAC; 98–105	SMB; 104–116
Rain or Shine (ROS)	MAC; 116–109	TNT; 112–109	MER; 109–102	BWB; 151–95	SMB; 116–112	CON; 120–111	TER; 124–117	PHX; 83–87	MAG; 91–82	NLEX; 90–92	BGSM; 90–114	TGR; 142–131
San Miguel (SMB)	TGR; 112–119	CON; 103–99	TNT; 92–118	MAC; 110–94	BGSM; 85–82	ROS; 112–116	MAG; 101–120	NLEX; 98–94	BWB; 120–126	MER; 103–92	TER; 126–110	PHX; 116–104
Terrafirma (TER)	TGR; 112–82	CON; 111–100*	BWB; 99–88	PHX; 105–133	MAG; 70–85	TNT; 89–101	ROS; 117–124	BGSM; 103–111	NLEX; 85–95	MAC; 102–84	SMB; 110–126	MER; 69–113
Titan Ultra (TGR)	TER; 82–112	PHX; 76–109	SMB; 119–112	MER; 105–118	BWB; 102–98	CON; 82–103	TNT; 92–97	MAC; 107–119	BGSM; 107–119	MAG; 98–135	NLEX; 112–123*	ROS; 131–142
TNT	ROS; 109–112	NLEX; 103–97	SMB; 118–92	MER; 106–110	TER; 101–89	BWB; 99–94	TGR; 97–92	CON; 92–97	MAC; 119–112	PHX; 97–100*	MAG; 94–106	BGSM; 86–93

Source: PBA.ph
Legend: Blue = win; Red = loss; Matches with lighter background shading were decided after overtime. (*) Number of asterisks denotes number of overtime periods

== Bracket ==
Quarterfinals (Top 4 twice-to-beat)
1	NLEX	93	112
8	TNT	96	118
4	Meralco	89	105
5	Magnolia	95	102*
2	Barangay Ginebra	112
7	Phoenix Super LPG	81
3	Rain or Shine	113
6	San Miguel	104

Semifinals (Best-of-7)
8	TNT	4
4	Meralco	2
2	Barangay Ginebra	4
3	Rain or Shine	2

Finals (Best-of-7)
8	TNT	3
2	Barangay Ginebra	4

*Game went into overtime

== Quarterfinals ==
The top four seeds have the twice-to-beat advantage; they only have to win once, while their opponents have to win twice, to advance.

=== (1) NLEX vs. (8) TNT ===
RPTV

May 13
5:15 pm

Box score

NLEX Road Warriors 93, TNT Tropang 5G 96
Scoring by quarter: 26–26, 26–24, 20–26, 21–20
Pts: Lalanne 17; Rebs: Lalanne 15; Asts: Gonzales 5	Pts: Bol 34; Rebs: Bol 14; Asts: Heading 4

Ninoy Aquino Stadium, Manila
Referees: Rommel Gruta, Jerry Narandan, Karlo Vergara, Jerome Gay

RPTV

May 16
7:30 pm

Box score

NLEX Road Warriors 112, TNT Tropang 5G 118
Scoring by quarter: 30–36, 24–28, 30–37, 28–17
Pts: Lalanne 46; Rebs: Lalanne 15; Asts: Bolick, Gonzales 6	Pts: Bol 35; Rebs: Bol 13; Asts: Castro 8
TNT wins series in two games

Ynares Center, Antipolo, Rizal
Referees: Peter Balao, Mike Flordeliza, Karlo Vergara, Jayson Vipinoso

=== (2) Barangay Ginebra vs. (7) Phoenix Super LPG ===
RPTV

May 15
7:30 pm

Box score

Barangay Ginebra San Miguel 112, Phoenix Super LPG Fuel Masters 81
Scoring by quarter: 30–29, 34–15, 26–10, 22–27
Pts: Brownlee 24; Rebs: Thompson 9 Asts: Thompson 9	Pts: Rivero 15; Rebs: Williams 11; Asts: Williams 3
Barangay Ginebra wins series in one game

Ynares Center, Antipolo, Rizal
Referees: Peter Balao, Mardy Montoya, Jeffrey Tantay, Charlie Amparado

=== (3) Rain or Shine vs. (6) San Miguel ===
RPTV

May 15
5:15 pm

Box score

Rain or Shine Elasto Painters 113, San Miguel Beermen 104
Scoring by quarter: 27–27, 30–29, 26–27, 30–21
Pts: Caracut 29; Rebs: Johnson 12; Asts: Tiongson 7	Pts: Boatwright 24; Rebs: Fajardo 12; Asts: Perez 5
Rain or Shine wins series in one game

Ynares Center, Antipolo, Rizal
Referees: Rommel Gruta, Mike Flordeliza, Kenny Hallig, John Francis Mira

=== (4) Meralco vs. (5) Magnolia ===
RPTV

May 13
7:30 pm

Box score

Meralco Bolts 89, Magnolia Chicken Timplados Hotshots 95
Scoring by quarter: 22–24, 18–26, 17–23, 32–22
Pts: Newsome 23; Rebs: Jones 6 Asts: Newsome 3	Pts: Chapman 21; Rebs: Chapman 12; Asts: Barroca, Lee 5

Ninoy Aquino Stadium, Manila
Referees: Peter Balao, Bing Oliva, James Paez, Jayson Vipinoso

RPTV

May 16
5:15 pm

Box score

Meralco Bolts 105, Magnolia Chicken Timplados Hotshots 102 (OT)
Scoring by quarter: 19–22, 25–25, 26–25, 22–20, Overtime: 13–10
Pts: Jones 28; Rebs: Jones 9 Asts: Newsome 5	Pts: Lastimosa 28; Rebs: Lucero 5 Asts: Barroca 5
Meralco wins series in two games

Ynares Center, Antipolo, Rizal
Referees: Rommel Gruta, Janine Nicandro, Jerry Narandan, Kenny Hallig

== Semifinals ==
The semifinals is a best-of-seven playoff.

=== (2) Barangay Ginebra vs. (3) Rain or Shine ===
RPTV

May 20
7:30 pm

Box score

Barangay Ginebra San Miguel 111, Rain or Shine Elasto Painters 115
Scoring by quarter: 17–26, 32–16, 28–32, 34–41
Pts: Brownlee 32; Rebs: Rosario 13; Asts: Brownlee 5	Pts: Johnson 40; Rebs: Johnson 19; Asts: Mamuyac 5

Ynares Center, Antipolo, Rizal
Attendance: 10,412
Referees: Rommel Gruta, Mike Flordeliza, James Paez, Cherwill Solon

RPTV

May 22
5:15 pm

Box score

Barangay Ginebra San Miguel 109, Rain or Shine Elasto Painters 101
Scoring by quarter: 33–20, 29–20, 26–29, 21–32
Pts: Brownlee 31; Rebs: Brownlee 15; Asts: Brownlee 8	Pts: Nocum 20; Rebs: Johnson 15; Asts: Johnson 7

SM Mall of Asia Arena, Pasay
Attendance: 11,522
Referees: Peter Balao, Jerry Narandan, Charlie Amparado, Karlo Vergara

RPTV

May 24
7:30 pm

Box score

Barangay Ginebra San Miguel 103, Rain or Shine Elasto Painters 98
Scoring by quarter: 27–31, 21–26, 29–12, 26–30
Pts: Thompson 25; Rebs: Brownlee 8 Asts: Brownlee 9	Pts: Johnson, Tiongson 23; Rebs: Johnson 21; Asts: Johnson 8

SM Mall of Asia Arena, Pasay
Attendance: 13,524
Referees: Rommel Gruta, Bing Oliva, Kenny Hallig, Cherwill Solon

RPTV

May 27
5:15 pm

Box score

Barangay Ginebra San Miguel 85, Rain or Shine Elasto Painters 97
Scoring by quarter: 23–31, 13–27, 29–19, 20–20
Pts: Brownlee 27; Rebs: J. Aguilar, Brownlee 10; Asts: Brownlee 4	Pts: Johnson 13; Rebs: Johnson 12; Asts: Johnson, Mamuyac 4

Araneta Coliseum, Quezon City
Attendance: 14,615
Referees: Peter Balao, Mardy Montoya, Jayson Vipinoso, Jerome Gay

RPTV

May 29
7:30 pm

Box score

Barangay Ginebra San Miguel 111, Rain or Shine Elasto Painters 104
Scoring by quarter: 31–26, 25–18, 27–27, 28–33
Pts: Brownlee 32; Rebs: three players 7 Asts: Abarrientos 8	Pts: Nocum 25; Rebs: Johnson 14; Asts: Tiongson 6

Araneta Coliseum, Quezon City
Attendance: 11,779
Referees: Rommel Gruta, Mike Flordeliza, Charlie Amparado, Jayson Vipinoso

RPTV

May 31
5:15 pm

Box score

Barangay Ginebra San Miguel 118, Rain or Shine Elasto Painters 107
Scoring by quarter: 22–22, 38–23, 33–40, 25–22
Pts: Brownlee 31; Rebs: Brownlee 15; Asts: Abarrientos 7	Pts: Johnson 27; Rebs: Johnson 14; Asts: Nocum 7
Barangay Ginebra wins series, 4–2

Ynares Center, Antipolo, Rizal
Attendance: 11,321
Referees: Peter Balao, Mardy Montoya, Jerry Narandan, Jeffrey Tantay

=== (4) Meralco vs. (8) TNT ===
RPTV

May 20
5:15 pm

Box score

Meralco Bolts 89, TNT Tropang 5G 94
Scoring by quarter: 21–28, 28–25, 20–16, 20–25
Pts: Jones 22; Rebs: Jones 14; Asts: Brickman 6	Pts: Bol 37; Rebs: Bol, Oftana 11; Asts: Bol 8

Ynares Center, Antipolo, Rizal
Attendance: 10,412
Referees: Peter Balao, Bing Oliva, Kenny Hallig, Karlo Vergara

RPTV

May 22
7:30 pm

Box score

Meralco Bolts 87, TNT Tropang 5G 76
Scoring by quarter: 15–22, 20–18, 22–17, 30–19
Pts: Newsome 24; Rebs: Jones 13; Asts: Brickman 4	Pts: Pogoy 27; Rebs: Oftana 9 Asts: Nambatac 4

SM Mall of Asia Arena, Pasay
Attendance: 11,522
Referees: Rommel Gruta, Bing Oliva, Mardy Montoya, Jerome Gay

RPTV

May 24
5:15 pm

Box score

Meralco Bolts 75, TNT Tropang 5G 77
Scoring by quarter: 16–20, 18–23, 25–12, 16–22
Pts: Jones 22; Rebs: Jones 15; Asts: Brickman 7	Pts: Nambatac 18; Rebs: Ganuelas-Rosser, Nambatac 8 Asts: Nambatac 3

SM Mall of Asia Arena, Pasay
Attendance: 13,524
Referees: Peter Balao, Jerry Narandan, James Paez, Jerome Gay

RPTV

May 27
7:30 pm

Box score

Meralco Bolts 101, TNT Tropang 5G 90
Scoring by quarter: 32–23, 18–25, 23–23, 28–19
Pts: Gardner 20; Rebs: Gardner 13; Asts: Brickman 6	Pts: McCullough 24; Rebs: McCullough 9 Asts: Castro, Heading 5

Araneta Coliseum, Quezon City
Attendance: 14,615
Referees: Rommel Gruta, Bing Oliva, Jerry Narandan, Kenny Hallig

RPTV

May 29
5:15 pm

Box score

Meralco Bolts 95, TNT Tropang 5G 103
Scoring by quarter: 19–22, 23–19, 30–35, 23–27
Pts: Gardner 25; Rebs: Gardner 12; Asts: Banchero 6	Pts: McCullough 42; Rebs: McCullough 11; Asts: Castro 7

Araneta Coliseum, Quezon City
Attendance: 11,779
Referees: Peter Balao, Mardy Montoya, James Paez, Jerome Gay

RPTV

May 31
7:30 pm

Box score

Meralco Bolts 94, TNT Tropang 5G 97
Scoring by quarter: 25–29, 19–22, 27–28, 23–18
Pts: Gardner 32; Rebs: Gardner 13; Asts: Brickman 8	Pts: Heading 30; Rebs: McCullough 13; Asts: McCullough 7
TNT wins series, 4–2

Ynares Center, Antipolo, Rizal
Attendance: 11,321
Referees: Rommel Gruta, Bing Oliva, Mike Flordeliza, Jayson Vipinoso

== Finals ==
This is a best-of-seven playoff.

RPTV

June 3
7:30 pm

Box score

Barangay Ginebra San Miguel 102, TNT Tropang 5G 100

Smart Araneta Coliseum, Quezon City

RPTV

June 5
7:30 pm

Box score

Barangay Ginebra San Miguel 94, TNT Tropang 5G 101

Smart Araneta Coliseum, Quezon City

RPTV

June 7
7:30 pm

Box score

Barangay Ginebra San Miguel 116, TNT Tropang 5G 102

Smart Araneta Coliseum, Quezon City

RPTV

June 10
7:35 pm

Box score

Barangay Ginebra San Miguel 98, TNT Tropang 5G 106

SM Mall of Asia Arena, Pasay

RPTV

June 12
7:30 pm

Box score

Barangay Ginebra San Miguel 100, TNT Tropang 5G 95 (OT)

Smart Araneta Coliseum, Quezon City

RPTV

June 14
7:30 pm

Box score

Barangay Ginebra San Miguel 90, TNT Tropang 5G 98

Smart Araneta Coliseum, Quezon City

RPTV

June 17
7:30 pm

Box score

Barangay Ginebra San Miguel 88, TNT Tropang 5G 76
Barangay Ginebra wins series, 4–3

SM Mall of Asia Arena, Pasay

== Imports ==
The following is the list of imports, which had played for their respective teams at least once, with the returning imports in italics. Highlighted are the imports who stayed with their respective teams for the whole conference.

For guest team Macau Black Knights, players from Greater China (China, Hong Kong, Macau, Taiwan) are considered as locals. They cannot have Filipino players in their roster.

Team	Name	Debuted	Last game	Record	Ref.
Barangay Ginebra San Miguel	(United States) Justin Brownlee	March 20 (vs. Macau)	June 17 (vs. TNT)	18–8	
Blackwater Bossing	(Nigeria) Daniel Ochefu	March 13 (vs. NLEX)	March 18 (vs. Terrafirma)	0–2	
Blackwater Bossing	(United States) Robert Upshaw	March 22 (vs. Magnolia)	May 9 (vs. Converge)	2–7	
Blackwater Bossing	No import	April 28 (vs. Macau)		0–1	
Converge FiberXers	(United States) Kylor Kelley	March 11 (vs. Macau)	April 22 (vs. TNT)	3–6	
Converge FiberXers	(United States) Donovan Smith	April 26 (vs. Phoenix Super LPG)	May 9 (vs. Blackwater)	2–1	
Macau Black Knights	(United States) Tony Mitchell	March 11 (vs. Converge)	May 6 (vs. Phoenix Super LPG)	3–9	
Magnolia Chicken Timplados Hotshots	(South Sudan) Nuni Omot	March 13 (vs. Phoenix Super LPG)	March 22 (vs. Blackwater)	0–3	
Magnolia Chicken Timplados Hotshots	(United States) Clint Chapman	March 28 (vs. Macau)	May 16 (vs. Meralco)	8–3	
Meralco Bolts	(United States) Marvin Jones	March 13 (vs. Converge)	May 24 (vs. TNT)	10–7	
Meralco Bolts	(Egypt) Patrick Gardner	May 27 (vs. TNT)	May 31 (vs. TNT)	1–2	
NLEX Road Warriors	(Haiti) Cady Lalanne	March 18 (vs. Blackwater)	May 16 (vs. TNT)	10–4	
Phoenix Super LPG Fuel Masters	(United States) James Dickey III	March 13 (vs. Magnolia)	April 21 (vs. Rain or Shine)	5–3	
Phoenix Super LPG Fuel Masters	No import	April 26 (vs. Converge)		0–1	
Phoenix Super LPG Fuel Masters	(United States) Johnathan Williams	May 1 (vs. TNT)	May 15 (vs. Barangay Ginebra)	1–3	
Rain or Shine Elasto Painters	(United States) Jaylen Johnson	March 14 (vs. Macau)	May 31 (vs. Barangay Ginebra)	11–7	
Rain or Shine Elasto Painters	No import	March 27 (vs. Meralco)		1–0	
San Miguel Beermen	(United States) Marcus Lee	March 21 (vs. Titan Ultra)	March 28 (vs. TNT)	1–2	
San Miguel Beermen	(United States) Justin Patton	March 31 (vs. Macau)	April 8 (vs. Rain or Shine)	2–1	
San Miguel Beermen	No import	April 12 (vs. Magnolia)		0–1	
San Miguel Beermen	(United States) Bennie Boatwright	April 19 (vs. NLEX)	May 15 (vs. Rain or Shine)	4–2	
Terrafirma Dyip	(Finland) Mubashar Ali	March 11 (vs. Titan Ultra)	May 6 (vs. San Miguel)	4–7	
Terrafirma Dyip	No import	May 8 (vs. Meralco)		0–1	
Titan Ultra Giant Risers	(Belgium) Michael Gilmore	March 11 (vs. Terrafirma)	May 8 (vs. Rain or Shine)	2–10	
TNT Tropang 5G	(United States) Bol Bol	March 20 (vs. Rain or Shine)	May 22 (vs. Meralco)	9–7	
TNT Tropang 5G	No import	May 24 (vs. Meralco)		1–0	
TNT Tropang 5G	(United States) Chris McCullough	May 27 (vs. Meralco)	June 17 (vs. Barangay Ginebra)	5–5	

== Awards ==
=== Player of the Week ===
Week	Player	Ref.
March 11–15	Jerrick Ahanmisi (Terrafirma Dyip)	
March 18–22	Adrian Nocum (Rain or Shine Elasto Painters)	
March 25–29	Robert Bolick (NLEX Road Warriors)	
March 31 – April 5	CJ Perez (San Miguel Beermen)	
April 7–12	Adrian Nocum (Rain or Shine Elasto Painters)	
April 14–19	Schonny Winston (NLEX Road Warriors)	
April 21–26	Justin Arana (Converge FiberXers)	
April 28 – May 3	Robert Bolick (NLEX Road Warriors)	
May 5–10	Mark Barroca (Magnolia Chicken Timplados Hotshots)	
May 13–16	Andrei Caracut (Rain or Shine Elasto Painters)	
May 20–24	Roger Pogoy (TNT Tropang 5G)	
May 27–31	RJ Abarrientos (Barangay Ginebra San Miguel)	

== Statistics ==
=== Individual statistical leaders ===
==== Local players ====
Category	Player	Team	Statistic
Points per game	RJ Abarrientos	Barangay Ginebra San Miguel	21.5
Rebounds per game	June Mar Fajardo	San Miguel Beermen	14.8
Assists per game	Robert Bolick	NLEX Road Warriors	8.8
Steals per game	Joshua Munzon	Titan Ultra Giant Risers	2.9
Blocks per game	Zavier Lucero	Magnolia Chicken Timplados Hotshots	1.9
Turnovers per game	Juan Gómez de Liaño	Converge FiberXers	3.1
Fouls per game	Anthony Semerad	NLEX Road Warriors	4.1
Minutes per game	Jenning Leung	Macau Black Knights	40.8
FG%	Ian Sangalang	Magnolia Chicken Timplados Hotshots	69.8%
FT%	Jordan Heading	TNT Tropang 5G	95.8%
3FG%	Chris Newsome	Meralco Bolts	53.3%
4FG%	Jerrick Ahanmisi	Terrafirma Dyip	24.5%
Double-doubles	June Mar Fajardo	San Miguel Beermen	10
Triple-doubles	Robert Bolick	NLEX Road Warriors	1
Triple-doubles	Scottie Thompson	Barangay Ginebra San Miguel	1

==== Import players ====
Category	Player	Team	Statistic
Points per game	Bol Bol	TNT Tropang 5G	38.2
Rebounds per game	Johnathan Williams	Phoenix Super LPG Fuel Masters	16.7
Assists per game	Johnathan Williams	Phoenix Super LPG Fuel Masters	6.0
Steals per game	Michael Gilmore	Titan Ultra Giant Risers	2.1
Blocks per game	Bol Bol	TNT Tropang 5G	4.3
Turnovers per game	Mubashar Ali	Terrafirma Dyip	4.4
Fouls per game	Donovan Smith	Converge FiberXers	5.3
Minutes per game	Johnathan Williams	Phoenix Super LPG Fuel Masters	43.3
FG%	Robert Upshaw	Blackwater Bossing	57.1%
FT%	Clint Chapman	Magnolia Chicken Timplados Hotshots	82.4%
3FG%	Clint Chapman	Magnolia Chicken Timplados Hotshots	42.9%
4FG%	Robert Upshaw	Blackwater Bossing	40.9%
Double-doubles	Bol Bol	TNT Tropang 5G	15
Triple-doubles	Jaylen Johnson	Rain or Shine Elasto Painters	1

=== Individual game highs ===
==== Local players ====
Category	Player	Team	Statistic
Points	Ricci Rivero	Phoenix Super LPG Fuel Masters	40
Rebounds	June Mar Fajardo	San Miguel Beermen	20
Assists	Robert Bolick	NLEX Road Warriors	14
Steals	Alec Stockton	Converge FiberXers	6
Steals	Joshua Munzon	Titan Ultra Giant Risers	6
Blocks	Zavier Lucero	Magnolia Chicken Timplados Hotshots	5
Three point field goals	Lao Chong Pong	Macau Black Knights	8
Four point field goals	four players		3

==== Import players ====
Category	Player	Team	Statistic
Points	Justin Brownlee	Barangay Ginebra San Miguel	54
Rebounds	James Dickey III	Phoenix Super LPG Fuel Masters	26
Assists	Jaylen Johnson	Rain or Shine Elasto Painters	10
Steals	Michael Gilmore	Titan Ultra Giant Risers	5
Blocks	Bol Bol	TNT Tropang 5G	7
Three point field goals	Mubashar Ali	Terrafirma Dyip	7
Four point field goals	Robert Upshaw	Blackwater Bossing	4

=== Team statistical leaders ===
Category	Team	Statistic
Points per game	Rain or Shine Elasto Painters	112.0
Rebounds per game	Rain or Shine Elasto Painters	58.0
Assists per game	Rain or Shine Elasto Painters	26.8
Steals per game	Titan Ultra Giant Risers	9.1
Blocks per game	TNT Tropang 5G	6.1
Turnovers per game	Blackwater Bossing	15.9
Fouls per game	Meralco Bolts	26.8
FG%	Magnolia Chicken Timplados Hotshots	48.8%
FT%	Magnolia Chicken Timplados Hotshots	79.9%
3FG%	Magnolia Chicken Timplados Hotshots	38.3%
4FG%	Phoenix Super LPG Fuel Masters	37.9%
