= 2026 PBA Governors' Cup =

Third conference of the 2025–26 PBA season

- Duration: July 10, 2026 – present
- TV partner(s): RPTV; PBA Rush (HD)
- Streaming partner(s): Cignal Play; One Sports YouTube Channel

PBA Governors' Cup chronology
- < 2024

PBA conference chronology
- < 2026 Commissioner's

The 2026 PBA Governors' Cup, also referred to as the PBA season 50 Governors' Cup, is the third and final conference of the 2025–26 PBA season of the Philippine Basketball Association (PBA). The 23rd edition of the Governors' Cup started on July 10, 2026. The tournament allowed teams to hire foreign players or imports with a height limit of 6 feet 6 inches (1.98 m). A break was held from August 15 to October 6 to make way for the preparations for the upcoming FIBA World Cup Asian Qualifiers and 2026 Asian Games, the conference will be extended to 5 months. The TNT Tropang 5G are the defending Governors' Cup champions.

The Macau Giant Pandas, which last played as the Macau Black Knights in the previous conference, returned as a guest team.

== Format ==
The following format was observed for the duration of the conference:

- The teams were divided into 2 groups, based on the previous conference's conference finish on a weighted average, with 40% for the Commissioner's Cup, and 60% for the Philippine Cup. This was identically distributed to the reverse drafting order.
  - Group A:
    1. TNT Tropang 5G (1st)
    2. San Miguel Beermen (4th)
    3. Converge FiberXers (5th)
    4. NLEX Road Warriors (8th)
    5. Titan Ultra Giant Risers (9th)
    6. Terrafirma Dyip (12th)
    7. Macau Giant Pandas (13th, Guest Team)
  - Group B:
    1. Barangay Ginebra San Miguel (2nd)
    2. Rain or Shine Elasto Painters (3rd)
    3. Meralco Bolts (6th)
    4. Magnolia Chicken Timplados Hotshots (7th)
    5. Blackwater Bossing (10th)
    6. Phoenix Super LPG Fuel Masters (11th)
- Teams in a group will play each other twice (12 games per team in Group A and 10 games per team in Group B). Teams are then seeded by basis on win–loss records by basis of groups. Ties are broken among point differentials of the tied teams.
- The top four teams per group will qualify to the crossover best-of-five quarterfinals.
  - QF1: Group A #1 vs. Group B #4
  - QF2: Group A #2 vs. Group B #3
  - QF3: Group A #3 vs. Group B #2
  - QF4: Group A #4 vs. Group B #1
- The two winners in each group will play in the best-of-five semifinals.
  - SF1: QF1 vs. QF3
  - SF2: QF2 vs. QF4
- The two remaining teams that came out on top in their respective group will play in the best-of-seven championship series.

== Elimination round ==
The PBA suspended games scheduled on August 9 due to inclement weather caused by the southwest monsoon.

=== Group A ===
==== Team standings ====
Pos	Team	W	L	PCT	GB	Qualification
1	NLEX Road Warriors	9	3	.750 (Note: Head-to-head quotient: NLEX 1.05, San Miguel 0.95)	—	Quarterfinals
2	San Miguel Beermen	9	3	.750	—	Quarterfinals
3	Converge FiberXers	8	4	.667	1	Quarterfinals
4	TNT Tropang 5G	7	5	.583	2	Quarterfinals
5	Terrafirma Dyip	5	7	.417	4	
6	Macau Giant Pandas (G)	2	10	.167 (Note: Head-to-head quotient: Macau 1.01, Titan Ultra 0.99)	7	
7	Titan Ultra Giant Risers	2	10	.167	7	

Source: PBA.ph
Rules for classification: 1) winning percentage; 2) head-to-head quotient (goal average); 3) head-to-head record; 4) coin toss
(G) Guests

==== Results ====
Team	Game											
Team	1	2	3	4	5	6	7	8	9	10	11	12
Converge (CON)	TGR; 105–74	TER; 105–103	MAC; 149–124	SMB; 122–128	TNT; 107–110	NLEX; 107–119	SMB; 114–126	TER; 120–103	NLEX; 112–110	TGR; 152–119	MAC; 162–108	TNT; 114–112*
Macau (MAC)	NLEX; 75–114	SMB; 109–123	CON; 124–149	TNT; 103–106	TGR; 132–126	TER; 96–92	TGR; 128–132	SMB; 79–131	NLEX; 78–138	TER; 127–146	TNT; 87–142	CON; 108–162
NLEX	MAC; 114–75	TER; 101–100	TGR; 135–100	SMB; 110–96	CON; 119–107	TNT; 88–83	TER; 109–114	TNT; 118–111*	CON; 110–112	MAC; 138–78	TGR; 147–115	SMB; 133–135
San Miguel (SMB)	MAC; 123–109	TER; 109–104	CON; 128–122	NLEX; 96–110	TGR; 143–105	TNT; 89–93*	CON; 126–114	MAC; 131–79	TGR; 143–113	TNT; 98–116	TER; 135–105	NLEX; 135–133
Terrafirma (TER)	TGR; 113–100	NLEX; 100–101	CON; 103–105	SMB; 104–109	TNT; 111–106*	MAC; 92–96	NLEX; 114–109	CON; 103–120	TNT; 92–116	MAC; 146–127	SMB; 105–135	TGR; 149–117
Titan Ultra (TGR)	TER; 100–113	CON; 74–105	NLEX; 100–135	TNT; 103–87	MAC; 126–132	SMB; 105–143	MAC; 132–128	TNT; 80–114	SMB; 113–143	CON; 119–152	NLEX; 115–147	TER; 117–149
TNT	MAC; 106–103	TGR; 87–103	TER; 106–111*	CON; 110–107	SMB; 93–89*	NLEX; 83–88	TGR; 114–80	NLEX; 111–118*	TER; 116–92	SMB; 116–98	MAC; 142–87	CON; 112–114*

Legend: Blue = win; Red = loss; Matches with lighter background shading were decided after overtime. (*) Number of asterisks denotes number of overtime periods

=== Group B ===
==== Team standings ====
Pos	Team	W	L	PCT	GB	Qualification
1	Magnolia Chicken Timplados Hotshots	7	3	.700	—	Quarterfinals
2	Rain or Shine Elasto Painters	6	4	.600	1	Quarterfinals
3	Barangay Ginebra San Miguel	5	5	.500 (Note: Head-to-head quotient: Barangay Ginebra 1.08, Phoenix Super LPG 0.92)	2	Quarterfinals
4	Phoenix Super LPG Fuel Masters	5	5	.500	2	Quarterfinals
5	Meralco Bolts	4	6	.400	3	
6	Blackwater Bossing	3	7	.300	4	

Source: PBA.ph
Rules for classification: 1) winning percentage; 2) head-to-head quotient (goal average); 3) head-to-head record; 4) coin toss

==== Results ====
Team	Game									
Team	1	2	3	4	5	6	7	8	9	10
Barangay Ginebra (BGSM)	PHX; 78–81	BWB; 115–85	ROS; 99–110	MER; 84–75	MAG; 73–88	MER; 88–97	ROS; 129–111	MAG; 93–112	PHX; 106–89	BWB; 101–96
Blackwater (BWB)	ROS; 131–108	MAG; 89–81	MER; 114–116	BGSM; 85–115	PHX; 93–102	PHX; 106–100	MAG; 101–107	MER; 115–120	ROS; 123–125	BGSM; 96–101
Magnolia (MAG)	PHX; 86–98	BWB; 81–89	MER; 112–98	ROS; 97–98	BGSM; 88–73	MER; 105–88	PHX; 115–101	BWB; 107–101	BGSM; 112–93	ROS; 107–103
Meralco (MER)	PHX; 97–98	ROS; 122–114	BWB; 116–114	MAG; 98–112	BGSM; 75–84	ROS; 83–85	MAG; 88–105	BGSM; 97–88	BWB; 120–115	PHX; 101–105
Phoenix Super LPG (PHX)	MAG; 98–86	MER; 98–97	BGSM; 81–78	ROS; 98–105	BWB; 102–93	BWB; 100–106	MAG; 101–115	MER; 105–101	BGSM; 89–106	ROS; 103–133
Rain or Shine (ROS)	BWB; 108–131	MER; 114–122	PHX; 105–98	BGSM; 110–99	MAG; 98–97	MER; 85–83	BGSM; 111–129	BWB; 125–123	MAG; 103–107	PHX; 133–103

Legend: Blue = win; Red = loss

== Bracket ==
Quarterfinals (Best-of-5)
A1	NLEX	3
B4	Phoenix Super LPG	0
B2	Rain or Shine	1
A3	Converge	3
B1	Magnolia	0
A4	TNT	3
A2	San Miguel	2
B3	Barangay Ginebra	3

Semifinals (Best-of-5)
A1	NLEX	0
A3	Converge	0
A4	TNT	0
B3	Barangay Ginebra	0

Finals (Best-of-7)
A

== Quarterfinals ==
The quarterfinals were a best-of-five playoff.

=== (A1) NLEX vs. (B4) Phoenix Super LPG ===
NLEX both won their regular-season games in the previous conferences. Due to the conference's current group format, NLEX and Phoenix did not play against each other during the regular elimination round. NLEX swept the series 3–0 to advance to the semifinals.

This was the first playoff meeting between these two teams.

RPTV

October 25
5:15 pm

Box score

NLEX Road Warriors 97, Phoenix Super LPG Fuel Masters 92
Scoring by quarter: 29–26, 27–22, 21–25, 20–19
Pts: Burton 27; Rebs: Burton 11; Asts: Bolick 4	Pts: Rivero 24; Rebs: Earlington 13; Asts: Rivero, Tio 5

Ynares Center, Antipolo, Rizal
Referees: Rommel Gruta, Mike Flordeliza, Charlie Amparado, Cherwill Solon

RPTV

October 28
7:30 pm

Box score

NLEX Road Warriors 124, Phoenix Super LPG Fuel Masters 117
Scoring by quarter: 35–33, 33–39, 25–22, 31–23
Pts: Bolick, Winston 31; Rebs: Burton 10; Asts: Bolick 4	Pts: Earlington 22; Rebs: Ballungay, Earlington 9 Asts: Mamuyac 8

Ynares Center, Antipolo, Rizal
Referees: Bing Oliva, Mardy Montoya, Kenny Hallig, Cherwill Solon

RPTV

October 31
5:15 pm

Box score

NLEX Road Warriors 137, Phoenix Super LPG Fuel Masters 89
Scoring by quarter: 43–21, 35–22, 29–28, 30–18
Pts: Bolick 23; Rebs: Burton 8 Asts: Alas, Bolick 5	Pts: Earlington 19; Rebs: Earlington 7 Asts: Rivero, Tuffin 3
NLEX wins series, 3–0

Ninoy Aquino Stadium, Manila
Referees: Rommel Gruta, Mike Flordeliza, Kenny Hallig, Irewin Traballo

=== (B1) Magnolia vs. (A4) TNT ===
The teams tied their regular-season group series 1–1. Due to the conference's current group format, Magnolia and TNT did not play against each other during the regular elimination round.

Defending champions TNT Tropang 5G swept the series 3–0 to advance to the semifinals.

This was the 22nd playoff meeting between these two teams, with the Tropang 5G winning 12 of the first 21 meetings.

Previous playoff series
TNT leads 12–9 in all-time playoff series

1992

Purefoods TJ Hotdogs 81, 7-Up Uncolas 77

1992 PBA All-Filipino Conference Semifinals

1994

Pepsi Mega Bottlers 3, Purefoods TJ Hotdogs 1

1994 PBA Governors' Cup Third Place Playoff

1997

Purefoods Carne Norte Beefies 93, Mobiline Cellulars 91

1997 PBA Governors' Cup Quarterfinals

1998

Mobiline Phone Pals 84, Purefoods TJ Hotdogs 80

1998 PBA Governors' Cup Semifinals

2000

Purefoods TJ Hotdogs 3, Mobiline Phone Pals 1

2000 PBA Governors' Cup Semifinals

2007

Talk 'N Text Phone Pals 3, Purefoods Chunkee Giants 1

2006–07 PBA Philippine Cup Quarterfinals

2008

Talk 'N Text Tropang Texters 98, Purefoods Tender Juicy Giants 83

2008 PBA Fiesta Conference Wildcard Phase

2009

Purefoods Tender Juicy Giants 126, Talk 'N Text Tropang Texters 123

2009 PBA Fiesta Conference Wildcard Phase

2010

Talk 'N Text Tropang Texters 113, Derby Ace Llamados 95

2010 PBA Fiesta Conference Third Place Playoff

2011

Talk 'N Text Tropang Texters 4, B-Meg Derby Ace Llamados 2

2010–11 PBA Philippine Cup Semifinals

2012

B-Meg Llamados 4, Talk 'N Text Tropang Texters 3

2012 PBA Commissioner's Cup finals

2014

San Mig Super Coffee Mixers 2, Talk 'N Text Tropang Texters 1

2013–14 PBA Philippine Cup Quarterfinals

2014

San Mig Super Coffee Mixers 3, Talk 'N Text Tropang Texters 1

2014 PBA Commissioner's Cup finals

2014

San Mig Super Coffee Mixers 3, Talk 'N Text Tropang Texters 2

2014 PBA Governors' Cup Semifinals

2015

Talk 'N Text Tropang Texters 3, Purefoods Star Hotshots 1

2015 PBA Commissioner's Cup Semifinals

2019

TNT KaTropa 98, Magnolia Pambansang Manok Hotshots 97

2019 PBA Governors' Cup Quarterfinals

2021

TNT Tropang Giga 4, Magnolia Pambansang Manok Hotshots 1

2021 PBA Philippine Cup finals

2022

TNT Tropang Giga 4, Magnolia Chicken Timplados Hotshots 2

2022 PBA Philippine Cup Semifinals

2024

Magnolia Chicken Timplados Hotshots 109, TNT Tropang Giga 94

2023-24 PBA Commissioner's Cup Quarterfinals

2025

TNT Tropang 5G 2, Magnolia Chicken Timplados Hotshots 0

2025 PBA Philippine Cup Quarterfinals

2025

TNT Tropang 5G 118, Magnolia Chicken Timplados Hotshots 109

2025-26 PBA Philippine Cup Quarterfinals

RPTV

October 25
7:30 pm

Box score

Magnolia Chicken Timplados Hotshots 70, TNT Tropang 5G 92
Scoring by quarter: 15–19, 18–23, 18–26, 19–24
Pts: Buffen 18; Rebs: Lucero 10; Asts: Koon, Lastimosa 2	Pts: Ro. Hollis-Jefferson 26; Rebs: Oftana 11; Asts: Ro. Hollis-Jefferson 5

Ynares Center, Antipolo, Rizal
Referees: Bing Oliva, Kenny Hallig, Karlo Vergara, Chester Gay

RPTV

October 28
5:15 pm

Box score

Magnolia Chicken Timplados Hotshots 73, TNT Tropang 5G 91
Scoring by quarter: 22–31, 20–20, 16–22, 15–18
Pts: Buffen 24; Rebs: Buffen 13; Asts: Barroca 4	Pts: Ro. Hollis-Jefferson 39; Rebs: Ro. Hollis-Jefferson 15; Asts: three players 3

Ynares Center, Antipolo, Rizal
Referees: Rommel Gruta, Jerry Narandan, Irewin Traballo, John Francis Mira

RPTV

October 31
7:30 pm

Box score

Magnolia Chicken Timplados Hotshots 87, TNT Tropang 5G 98
Scoring by quarter: 21–23, 20–27, 15–29, 31–19
Pts: Buffen 31; Rebs: Lucero 12; Asts: Gomez 6	Pts: Ro. Hollis-Jefferson 38; Rebs: Ganuelas-Rosser 11; Asts: Nambatac 5
TNT wins series, 3–0

Ninoy Aquino Stadium, Manila
Referees: Bing Oliva, Albert Nubla, Bryan Peclaro, Karlo Vergara

=== (A2) San Miguel vs. (B3) Barangay Ginebra ===
San Miguel both won their regular-season games in the previous conferences. Due to the conference's current group format, San Miguel and Barangay Ginebra did not play against each other during the regular elimination round.

Barangay Ginebra outlasted San Miguel after leading the series 2–0, in Game 5 to advance to the semifinals, 3–2.

This was the 31st playoff meeting between these two teams, with the Beermen winning 18 of the first 30 meetings.

Previous playoff series
San Miguel leads 18–12 in all-time playoff series

1983

San Miguel Beermen 2, Gilbey's Gin Tonics 1

1983 PBA Open Conference Third Place Playoff

1987

Magnolia Ice Cream Makers 4, Ginebra San Miguel 1

1987 PBA Open Conference Third Place Playoff

1987

Magnolia Ice Cream Makers 3, Ginebra San Miguel 0

1987 PBA All-Filipino Conference Third Place Playoff

1989

San Miguel Beermen 4, Añejo Rum 65ers 1

1989 PBA Reinforced Conference finals

1990

Añejo Rum 65ers 3, San Miguel Beermen 1

1990 PBA All-Filipino Conference Third Place Playoff

1992

Ginebra San Miguel 3, San Miguel Beermen 0

1992 PBA Third Conference Third Place Playoff

1996

San Miguel Beermen 100, Ginebra San Miguel 99

1996 PBA All-Filipino Cup Third Place Playoff

1996

Ginebra San Miguel 3, San Miguel Beermen 1

1996 PBA Governors' Cup Semifinals

1997

Gordon's Gin Boars 106, San Miguel Beermen 100

1997 PBA Commissioner's Cup Semifinals

2000

San Miguel Beermen 90, Barangay Ginebra Kings 89

2000 PBA Commissioner's Cup Quarterfinals

2001

San Miguel Beermen 4, Barangay Ginebra Kings 2

2001 PBA All-Filipino Cup finals

2005

Barangay Ginebra Kings 3, San Miguel Beermen 2

2004–05 PBA Philippine Cup Semifinals

2007

Barangay Ginebra Kings 4, San Miguel Beermen 2

2006–07 PBA Philippine Cup finals

2007

San Miguel Beermen 2, Barangay Ginebra Kings 1

2007 PBA Fiesta Conference Quarterfinals

2009

San Miguel Beermen 2, Barangay Ginebra Kings 1

2008–09 PBA Philippine Cup Quarterfinals

2009

San Miguel Beermen 4, Barangay Ginebra Kings 3

2009 PBA Fiesta Conference finals

2010

San Miguel Beermen 95, Barangay Ginebra Kings 88

2009–10 PBA Philippine Cup Third Place Playoff

2011

San Miguel Beermen 4, Barangay Ginebra Kings 2

2010–11 PBA Philippine Cup Semifinals

2013

Petron Blaze Boosters 101, Barangay Ginebra San Miguel 94

2013 PBA Governors' Cup Quarterfinals

2016

Barangay Ginebra San Miguel 3, San Miguel Beermen 2

2016 PBA Governors' Cup Semifinals

2017

San Miguel Beermen 4, Barangay Ginebra San Miguel 1

2016–17 PBA Philippine Cup finals

2017

Barangay Ginebra San Miguel 104, San Miguel Beermen 84

2017 PBA Governors' Cup Quarterfinals

2018

San Miguel Beermen 4, Barangay Ginebra San Miguel 1

2017–18 PBA Philippine Cup Semifinals

2018

Barangay Ginebra San Miguel 4, San Miguel Beermen 2

2018 PBA Commissioner's Cup finals

2019

Barangay Ginebra San Miguel 100, San Miguel Beermen 97

2019 PBA Governors' Cup Quarterfinals

2023

Barangay Ginebra San Miguel 3, San Miguel Beermen 0

2023 PBA Governors' Cup Semifinals

2024

San Miguel Beermen 3, Barangay Ginebra San Miguel 0

2023–24 PBA Commissioner's Cup Semifinals

2024

Barangay Ginebra San Miguel 4, San Miguel Beermen 2

2024 PBA Governors' Cup Semifinals

2025

San Miguel Beermen 4, Barangay Ginebra San Miguel 3

2025 PBA Philippine Cup Semifinals

2026

San Miguel Beermen 4, Barangay Ginebra San Miguel 2

2025-26 PBA Philippine Cup Semifinals

RPTV

October 27
7:30 pm

Box score

San Miguel Beermen 95, Barangay Ginebra San Miguel 104
Scoring by quarter: 26–25, 22–27, 22–24, 25–28
Pts: Perez, Trollano 21; Rebs: Brondial, Fajardo 10; Asts: Perez 4	Pts: Murphy 29; Rebs: Murphy, Thompson 11; Asts: Abarrientos, Thompson 6

Araneta Coliseum, Quezon City
Referees: Mardy Montoya, Mike Flordeliza, Jeffrey Tantay, Bryan Peclaro

RPTV

October 30
5:15 pm

Box score

San Miguel Beermen 99, Barangay Ginebra San Miguel 126
Scoring by quarter: 24–34, 38–35, 20–33, 17–24
Pts: Perez 18; Rebs: Fajardo 9 Asts: King, Perez 3	Pts: Murphy 33; Rebs: Murphy 10; Asts: Thompson 11

Ninoy Aquino Stadium, Manila
Referees: Rommel Gruta, Janine Nicandro, James Paez, Jayson Vipinoso

RPTV

November 3
7:30 pm

Box score

San Miguel Beermen 101, Barangay Ginebra San Miguel 98
Scoring by quarter: 23–18, 31–28, 25–28, 22–24
Pts: King 21; Rebs: Fajardo 13; Asts: Ross 6	Pts: Abarrientos 21; Rebs: Murphy 17; Asts: Thompson 8

Dasmariñas Arena, Dasmariñas, Cavite
Referees: Bing Oliva, Mike Flordeliza, Jerry Narandan, John Francis Mira

RPTV

November 6
5:15 pm

Box score

San Miguel Beermen 108, Barangay Ginebra San Miguel 102
Scoring by quarter: 26–26, 15–29, 46–18, 21–29
Pts: King 35; Rebs: King 15; Asts: Ross 9	Pts: Thompson 27; Rebs: Murphy 22; Asts: Cu 5

Araneta Coliseum, Quezon City
Referees: Peter Balao, Mardy Montoya, Janine Nicandro, Bryan Peclaro

RPTV

November 10
7:30 pm

Box score

San Miguel Beermen 94, Barangay Ginebra San Miguel 110
Scoring by quarter: 20–26, 37–23, 23–27, 14–34
Pts: King 31; Rebs: Fajardo 16; Asts: Perez 4	Pts: Murphy 31; Rebs: Murphy 11; Asts: Abarrientos 5
Barangay Ginebra wins series, 3–2

Ynares Center, Antipolo, Rizal
Referees: Rommel Gruta, Jerry Narandan, Karlo Vergara, Chester Gay

=== (B2) Rain or Shine vs. (A3) Converge ===
Rain or Shine both won their regular-season games in the previous conferences. Due to the conference's current group format, Rain or Shine and Converge did not play against each other during the regular elimination round.

Converge won the series 3–1 to advance to the semifinals for the very first time in franchise history since joining the league in 2022.

This was the second playoff meeting between these two teams, with the Elasto Painters winning the first meeting.

Previous playoff series
Rain or Shine leads 1–0 in all-time playoff series

2025

Rain or Shine Elasto Painters 2, Converge FiberXers 1

2024–25 PBA Commissioner's Cup Quarterfinals

RPTV

October 27
5:15 pm

Box score

Rain or Shine Elasto Painters 124, Converge FiberXers 120
Scoring by quarter: 25–41, 30–27, 42–28, 27–24
Pts: Fuller 33; Rebs: Fuller 14; Asts: Nocum 9	Pts: Clark 28; Rebs: Clark 8 Asts: Gómez de Liaño 7

Araneta Coliseum, Quezon City
Referees: Rommel Gruta, Charlie Amparado, James Paez, John Francis Mira

RPTV

October 30
7:30 pm

Box score

Rain or Shine Elasto Painters 125, Converge FiberXers 130
Scoring by quarter: 30–37, 26–33, 37–25, 32–35
Pts: Fuller 26; Rebs: Fuller 15; Asts: Nocum 18	Pts: Clark 22; Rebs: Baltazar 11; Asts: Gómez de Liaño 8

Ninoy Aquino Stadium, Manila
Referees: Bing Oliva, Jerry Narandan, Jeffrey Tantay, Chester Gay

RPTV

November 3
5:15 pm

Box score

Rain or Shine Elasto Painters 89, Converge FiberXers 105
Scoring by quarter: 32–32, 21–20, 22–30, 14–23
Pts: Pangilinan-Lemetti 18; Rebs: Fuller 13; Asts: Nocum 11	Pts: Gómez de Liaño 19; Rebs: Gómez de Liaño 13; Asts: Gómez de Liaño 6

Dasmariñas Arena, Dasmariñas, Cavite
Referees: Rommel Gruta, Mardy Montoya, James Paez, Chester Gay

RPTV

November 6
7:30 pm

Box score

Rain or Shine Elasto Painters 109, Converge FiberXers 120
Scoring by quarter: 27–39, 33–23, 27–27, 22–31
Pts: Fuller 23; Rebs: Fuller 10; Asts: Nocum 10	Pts: Clark 32; Rebs: Clark 12; Asts: Clark 6
Converge wins series, 3–1

Araneta Coliseum, Quezon City

== Semifinals ==
Note: Potential games are marked by an asterisk if necessary.

The semifinals will be a best-of-five playoff.

=== (A1) NLEX vs. (A3) Converge ===
NLEX and Converge tied their regular-season group series, with Converge winning their Philippine Cup matchup, NLEX winning their Comissioner's Cup battle and this conference's double-round robin elimination, 2–2.

This will be the first playoff meeting between these two teams.

RPTV

December 4
7:30 pm

NLEX Road Warriors vs. Converge FiberXers

Ninoy Aquino Stadium, Manila

RPTV

December 6
5:15 pm

NLEX Road Warriors vs. Converge FiberXers

SM Mall of Asia Arena, Pasay

RPTV

December 9
7:30 pm

NLEX Road Warriors vs. Converge FiberXers

Ynares Center, Antipolo, Rizal

RPTV

December 11
5:15 pm

NLEX Road Warriors vs. Converge FiberXers*

Araneta Coliseum, Quezon City

RPTV

December 13
7:30 pm

NLEX Road Warriors vs. Converge FiberXers*

Araneta Coliseum, Quezon City

=== (B3) Barangay Ginebra vs. (A4) TNT ===
Barangay Ginebra both won their regular-season games in the previous conferences. Due to the conference's current group format, Barangay Ginebra and TNT did not play against each other during the regular elimination round.

This will be the 21st playoff meeting between these two teams, with both teams winning 10 meetings each.

Previous playoff series
Tied 10–10 in all-time playoff series

1999

Barangay Ginebra Kings 2, Mobiline Phone Pals 0

1999 PBA All-Filipino Cup Quarterfinals

2000

Mobiline Phone Pals 1, Barangay Ginebra Kings 1

2000 PBA Governors' Cup Quarterfinals

2004

Barangay Ginebra Kings 2, Talk 'N Text Phone Pals 1

2004 PBA Fiesta Conference Semifinals

2005

Barangay Ginebra Kings 4, Talk 'N Text Phone Pals 2

2004–05 PBA Philippine Cup finals

2007

Barangay Ginebra Kings 4, Talk 'N Text Phone Pals 2

2006–07 PBA Philippine Cup Semifinals

2010

Barangay Ginebra Kings 3, Talk 'N Text Tropang Texters 2

2009–10 PBA Philippine Cup Quarterfinals

2011

Talk 'N Text Tropang Texters 4, Barangay Ginebra Kings 2

2011 PBA Commissioner's Cup finals

2013

Barangay Ginebra San Miguel 3, Talk 'N Text Tropang Texters 2

2013 PBA Commissioner's Cup Semifinals

2014

Talk 'N Text Tropang Texters 97, Barangay Ginebra San Miguel 84

2014 PBA Commissioner's Cup Quarterfinals

2014

Talk 'N Text Tropang Texters 83, Barangay Ginebra San Miguel 67

2014–15 PBA Philippine Cup Quarterfinals 2nd Phase

2017

TNT KaTropa 3, Barangay Ginebra San Miguel 1

2017 PBA Commissioner's Cup Semifinals

2017

Barangay Ginebra San Miguel 3, TNT KaTropa 1

2017 PBA Governors' Cup Semifinals

2019

TNT KaTropa 3, Barangay Ginebra San Miguel 1

2019 PBA Commissioner's Cup Semifinals

2020

Barangay Ginebra San Miguel 4, TNT Tropang Giga 1

2020 PBA Philippine Cup finals

2021

TNT Tropang Giga 84, Barangay Ginebra San Miguel 71

2021 PBA Philippine Cup Quarterfinals

2022

Barangay Ginebra San Miguel 2, TNT Tropang Giga 0

2021-22 PBA Governors' Cup Quarterfinals

2023

TNT Tropang Giga 4, Barangay Ginebra San Miguel 2

2023 PBA Governors' Cup finals

2024

TNT Tropang Giga 4, Barangay Ginebra San Miguel 2

2024 PBA Governors' Cup finals

2025

TNT Tropang Giga 4, Barangay Ginebra San Miguel 3

2024–25 PBA Commissioner's Cup finals

2026

Barangay Ginebra San Miguel 4, TNT Tropang 5G 3

2026 PBA Commissioner's Cup finals

RPTV

December 4
5:15 pm

Barangay Ginebra San Miguel vs. TNT Tropang 5G

Ninoy Aquino Stadium, Manila

RPTV

December 6
7:30 pm

Barangay Ginebra San Miguel vs. TNT Tropang 5G

SM Mall of Asia Arena, Pasay

RPTV

December 9
5:15 pm

Barangay Ginebra San Miguel vs. TNT Tropang 5G

Ynares Center, Antipolo, Rizal

RPTV

December 11
7:30 pm

Barangay Ginebra San Miguel vs. TNT Tropang 5G*

Araneta Coliseum, Quezon City

RPTV

December 13
5:15 pm

Barangay Ginebra San Miguel vs. TNT Tropang 5G*

Araneta Coliseum, Quezon City

== Imports ==
The following is the list of imports, which had played for their respective teams at least once, with the returning imports in italics. Highlighted are the imports who stayed with their respective teams for the whole conference.

Team	Name	Debuted	Last game	Record	Ref.
Barangay Ginebra San Miguel	(United States) Riley Grigsby	July 19 (vs. Phoenix Super LPG)	August 14 (vs. Meralco)	2–4	
Barangay Ginebra San Miguel	(Puerto Rico) Jordan Murphy	October 9 (vs. Rain or Shine)		6–3	
Blackwater Bossing	(United States) Kentrell Barkley	July 11 (vs. Rain or Shine)	October 23 (vs. Barangay Ginebra)	3–7	
Converge FiberXers	(United States) Jalen Hudson	July 12 (vs. Titan Ultra)	July 22 (vs. San Miguel)	3–1	
Converge FiberXers	(United States) Jamaal Franklin	July 28 (vs. TNT)	August 5 (vs. San Miguel)	0–3	
Converge FiberXers	(United States) Cameron Clark	August 11 (vs. Terrafirma)		8–1	
Macau Giant Pandas	(United States) De'Vondre Perry	July 10 (vs. NLEX)	August 4 (vs. Titan Ultra)	2–5	
Macau Giant Pandas	No import	August 8 (vs. San Miguel)		0–1	
Macau Giant Pandas	(Cambodia) Oscar Lopez	October 7 (vs. NLEX)	October 16 (vs. Converge)	0–4	
Magnolia Chicken Timplados Hotshots	(United States) KJ Buffen	July 11 (vs. Phoenix Super LPG)	October 31 (vs. TNT)	7–6	
Meralco Bolts	(United States) Antonio Hester	July 18 (vs. Rain or Shine)	August 7 (vs. Magnolia)	2–4	
Meralco Bolts	No import	July 15 (vs. Phoenix Super LPG)		0–1	
Meralco Bolts	(United States) Jordon Varnado	August 14 (vs. Barangay Ginebra)	October 16 (vs. Phoenix Super LPG)	2–1	
NLEX Road Warriors	(United States) DeQuan Jones	July 10 (vs. Macau)	August 11 (vs. TNT)	7–1	
NLEX Road Warriors	No import	August 14 (vs. Converge)		0–1	
NLEX Road Warriors	(United States) Deonte Burton	October 7 (vs. Macau)		5–1	
Phoenix Super LPG Fuel Masters	(United States) B. J. Johnson	July 11 (vs. Magnolia)	August 12 (vs. Magnolia)	4–3	
Phoenix Super LPG Fuel Masters	(United States) Marcellus Earlington	October 16 (vs. Meralco)	October 31 (vs. NLEX)	1–5	
Rain or Shine Elasto Painters	(United States) Aaron Fuller	July 11 (vs. Blackwater)	November 6 (vs. Converge)	7–7	
San Miguel Beermen	(United States) George King	July 14 (vs. Macau)	November 10 (vs. Barangay Ginebra)	11–6	
Terrafirma Dyip	(United States) Justin Strings	July 10 (vs. Titan Ultra)	October 17 (vs. Titan Ultra)	5–7	
Titan Ultra Giant Risers	(United States) Tirrell Brown	July 14 (vs. NLEX)	October 17 (vs. Terrafirma)	2–8	
Titan Ultra Giant Risers	No import	July 10 (vs. Terrafirma), July 12 (vs. Converge)		0–2	
TNT Tropang 5G	(United States) Darius Days	July 19 (vs. Macau)	July 28 (vs. Converge)	2–2	
TNT Tropang 5G	(United States) Rahlir Hollis-Jefferson	August 1 (vs. San Miguel)	August 11 (vs. NLEX)	2–2	
TNT Tropang 5G	(United States) Nick Hornsby	October 7 (vs. Terrafirma)	October 10 (vs. San Miguel)	2–0	
TNT Tropang 5G	(United States) Rondae Hollis-Jefferson	October 13 (vs. Macau)		4–1	

== Awards ==
=== Player of the Week ===
Week	Player	Ref.
July 10–12	RK Ilagan (Blackwater Bossing)	
July 14–19	Justin Arana (Converge FiberXers)	
July 21–26	Adrian Nocum (Rain or Shine Elasto Painters)	
July 28 – August 2	Rey Nambatac (TNT Tropang 5G)	
August 4–8	Maverick Ahanmisi (Terrafirma Dyip)	
August 11–14	Jerom Lastimosa (Magnolia Chicken Timplados Hotshots)	
October 7–11	Zavier Lucero (Magnolia Chicken Timplados Hotshots)	
October 13–18	Juan Gómez de Liaño (Converge FiberXers)	
October 21–25	Robert Bolick (NLEX Road Warriors)	
October 27–31	Robert Bolick (NLEX Road Warriors)	

== Statistics ==
Statistics as of November 10, 2026.

=== Individual statistical leaders ===
==== Local players ====
Category	Player	Team	Statistic
Points per game	Calvin Oftana	TNT Tropang 5G	22.8
Rebounds per game	Geo Chiu	Terrafirma Dyip	10.9
Assists per game	Maverick Ahanmisi	Terrafirma Dyip	8.5
Steals per game	Scottie Thompson	Barangay Ginebra San Miguel	2.2
Blocks per game	Geo Chiu	Terrafirma Dyip	2.0
Turnovers per game	Kobey Lam	Macau Giant Pandas	3.3
Fouls per game	Brandon Ganuelas-Rosser	TNT Tropang 5G	3.4
Minutes per game	Kobey Lam	Macau Giant Pandas	37.7
FG%	James Una	Blackwater Bossing	75.7%
FT%	Paul Lee	Magnolia Chicken Timplados Hotshots	100.0%
3FG%	Allein Maliksi	Meralco Bolts	52.0%
4FG%	Juan Gómez de Liaño	Converge FiberXers	43.5%
Double-doubles	Justine Baltazar	Converge FiberXers	7
Double-doubles	June Mar Fajardo	San Miguel Beermen	7
Triple-doubles	Juan Gómez de Liaño	Converge FiberXers	2

==== Import players ====
Category	Player	Team	Statistic
Points per game	Oscar Lopez	Macau Giant Pandas	36.8
Rebounds per game	Kentrell Barkley	Blackwater Bossing	14.5
Rebounds per game	Oscar Lopez	Macau Giant Pandas	14.5
Assists per game	Deonte Burton	NLEX Road Warriors	6.0
Steals per game	Deonte Burton	NLEX Road Warriors	3.3
Blocks per game	Deonte Burton	NLEX Road Warriors	3.3
Turnovers per game	Oscar Lopez	Macau Giant Pandas	4.5
Fouls per game	Jordon Varnado	Meralco Bolts	4.3
Minutes per game	Oscar Lopez	Macau Giant Pandas	45.6
FG%	Cameron Clark	Converge FiberXers	62.2%
FT%	Deonte Burton	NLEX Road Warriors	88.2%
3FG%	KJ Buffen	Magnolia Chicken Timplados Hotshots	54.5%
4FG%	Oscar Lopez	Macau Giant Pandas	40.0%
Double-doubles	Aaron Fuller	Rain or Shine Elasto Painters	11
Triple-doubles	Kentrell Barkley	Blackwater Bossing	1

=== Individual game highs ===
==== Local players ====
Category	Player	Team	Statistic
Points	Kobey Lam	Macau Giant Pandas	49
Rebounds	Rodney Brondial	San Miguel Beermen	25
Assists	Adrian Nocum	Rain or Shine Elasto Painters	18
Steals	RK Ilagan	Blackwater Bossing	6
Blocks	Geo Chiu	Terrafirma Dyip	6
Three point field goals	three players		7
Four point field goals	Ramon Cao	Macau Giant Pandas	5

==== Import players ====
Category	Player	Team	Statistic
Points	George King	San Miguel Beermen	46
Rebounds	Oscar Lopez	Macau Giant Pandas	26
Assists	Kentrell Barkley	Blackwater Bossing	10
Steals	Deonte Burton	NLEX Road Warriors	6
Blocks	Deonte Burton	NLEX Road Warriors	6
Three point field goals	KJ Buffen	Magnolia Chicken Timplados Hotshots	7
Three point field goals	B. J. Johnson	Phoenix Super LPG Fuel Masters	7
Four point field goals	Riley Grigsby	Barangay Ginebra San Miguel	4
Four point field goals	George King	San Miguel Beermen	4

=== Team statistical leaders ===
Category	Team	Statistic
Points per game	Converge FiberXers	122.4
Rebounds per game	Converge FiberXers	55.1
Assists per game	Converge FiberXers	29.4
Steals per game	TNT Tropang 5G	9.3
Blocks per game	San Miguel Beermen	4.8
Turnovers per game	Rain or Shine Elasto Painters	17.0
Fouls per game	Meralco Bolts	23.1
FG%	Converge FiberXers	50.6%
FT%	Converge FiberXers	80.1%
3FG%	San Miguel Beermen	39.2%
4FG%	Converge FiberXers	40.0%
