= Barangay Ginebra–Meralco rivalry =

Philippine Basketball Association rivalry

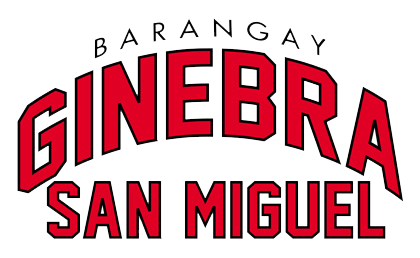
- Barangay Ginebra San Miguel
- First meeting: October 3, 2010; Barangay Ginebra 72, Meralco 73, Smart Araneta Coliseum
- Latest meeting: August 14, 2026; Meralco 97, Barangay Ginebra 88, Smart Araneta Coliseum
- Next meeting: TBD

Statistics
- Total meetings: 92
- All-time series: 55–37 (Barangay Ginebra)
- Regular season series: 24–20 (Barangay Ginebra)
- Postseason results: 31–17 (Barangay Ginebra)
- Longest win streak: Barangay Ginebra W5
- Current win streak: Meralco W1

Postseason history
- 2012 Governors Cup Round Robin Semifinals: Barangay Ginebra won, 1–0; 2016 Governors Cup Finals: Barangay Ginebra won, 4–2; 2017 Governors Cup Finals: Barangay Ginebra won, 4–3; 2018 Commissioner's Cup Quarterfinals: Barangay Ginebra won, 2–0; 2019 Governors Cup Finals: Barangay Ginebra won, 4–1; 2020 Philippine Cup Semifinals: Barangay Ginebra won, 3–2; 2021 Governors Cup Finals: Barangay Ginebra won, 4–2; 2022 Philippine Cup Quarterfinals: Meralco won, 2–1; 2024 Philippine Cup Semifinals: Meralco won, 4–3; 2024 Governors Cup Quarterfinals: Barangay Ginebra won, 3–0; 2024–25 Commissioner's Cup Quarterfinals: Barangay Ginebra won, 2–1

The Barangay Ginebra–Meralco rivalry is an PBA rivalry between the Barangay Ginebra San Miguel and the Meralco Bolts. It is an intense rivalry that often features contested games. It is a part of SMC–MVP rivalry since Ginebra is owned by San Miguel Corporation and Meralco is part of the MVP Group.

== History ==
=== Early days ===
Barangay Ginebra and Meralco first met on October 3, 2010, in the 2010–11 PBA Philippine Cup opening and Bolts win the game 73-72, but after the win, Meralco is still eliminated from the conference because of bad performance for the last remaining games.

=== The rivalry is born ===
==== 2016 Governors' Cup Finals ====
Under the tutelage of Norman Black, with Jimmy Alapag as one of its players, he led the Bolts to its first PBA Finals appearance in 2016 PBA Governors Cup. But that time, Barangay Ginebra came from being a quarterfinalist to a title contender under Tim Cone. After Bolts leading in the series twice, Barangay Ginebra won in Games 4, 5 & 6, thanks to a run led by its veteran superstars Jayjay Helterbrand and former Alaska Aces player LA Tenorio, with Justin Brownlee's buzzer-beater.

==== 2017 Governors' Cup Finals ====
The two teams met again in the 2017 Governors' Cup Finals, but the only difference is Greg Slaughter was in the Barangay Ginebra's lineup, Ranidel de Ocampo was in the Meralco and Alapag retired. Barangay Ginebra lead the series 2-0, but Meralco resurgence, and ties the series. But in Game 5, Allen Durham, Bolts' import, called out the officiating of that game as one of the reasons why they lost. As a result, he was fined P30,000. Eventually, Barangay Ginebra won in seven games.

==== 2018 Commissioner's Cup Quarterfinals ====
Barangay Ginebra swept the Bolts in the best-of-three quarterfinals series.

==== 2019 Governors' Cup Finals ====
In this time they met again in the 2019 PBA Governors' Cup Finals. Jared Dillinger was now a Barangay Ginebra, after Meralco released him, while Raymond Almazan was added to the latter.

In Game 1 of the Finals, Meralco's Allen Durham, who scored 25 points, grabbed 18 rebounds and dishing 10 assists was blocked by Japeth Aguilar at the rim in the late 4th quarter that sealed a Ginebra win. Bolts tied the series the next game, with Durham getting a near 20-20 double-double and the Bolts stepping up. But the Bolts lost in Game 3, and Almazan was hurt, which led to him being ruled out of the game. Before Game 4, Durham beat Brownlee once again for Best Import of the Conference, while Christian Standhardinger won Best Player of the Conference. But the series resulted in Barangay Ginebra winning the series, 4–1.

==== 2020 Philippine Cup Semifinals ====
At the middle of the bubble, Barangay Ginebra won the best-of-five semifinals series against Meralco by a Scottie Thompson game winner. In Game 4, Reynel Hugnatan of Meralco was allegedly said in the middle of the game that the game is cooked and the calls favored Barangay Ginebra by stating 'Ref, lutong luto to ah'. He later denied the accusation.

==== 2021 Governors' Cup Finals ====
The Meralco Bolts traded Baser Amer now have Chris Banchero, and Barangay Ginebra have their former player John "Nards" Pinto. The Bolts led the series 2-1, but just like in 2016, Barangay Ginebra wins 3 straight to win the championship. In Game 1 of the series, Barangay Ginebra's Arvin Tolentino and Meralco's Raymar Jose have altercation.

==== 2022 Philippine Cup Quarterfinals ====
Due to Norman Black's temporary leave, Tim Cone's former lieutenant Luigi Trillo acted as interim coach. Due to a Raymond Almazan three-pointer and a Scottie Thompson offensive foul, Bolts finally won their first playoff series against Barangay Ginebra.

==== 2024 Philippine Cup Semifinals ====
With Luigi Trillo became the head coach and Nenad Vucinic as active consultant, two teams met again in the semifinals. In Game 1 and 5, Ginebra led twice in the series by winning 4 points in both games. Bolts beaten Barangay Ginebra in seven games from a 3-2 deficit to advance into the Finals.

==== 2024 Governors' Cup Quarterfinals ====
Justin Brownlee returns to Barangay Ginebra while Allen Durham returns to Meralco for the 2024 PBA Governors' Cup. Barangay Ginebra sweeps the Meralco in a best-of-5 quarterfinals, 3–0.

==== 2024–25 Commissioner's Cup Quarterfinals ====
With Brownlee returned again for Ginebra in 2024–25 Commissioner's Cup, Akil Mitchell is tapped to be the reinforcement of Meralco. The two met again the quarterfinals, with Ginebra winning the first game, and tied the second game by Meralco. In the series ending game, Ginebra wins the series in their best of 3 quarterfinal affair against Meralco.

== Players who played for both teams ==
=== Local ===
- Paul Artadi
- Marlou Aquino
- Mac Baracael
- KG Canaleta
- Mike Cortez
- Jared Dillinger
- John Ferriols
- Jammer Jamito
- Chico Lanete
- Mark Macapagal
- Allein Maliksi
- Sol Mercado
- John "Nards" Pinto
- Jay-R Reyes
- Nico Salva
- Sunday Salvacion
- John Wilson
- Joseph Yeo

=== Import ===
- Tony Bishop
- Justin Brownlee
