= San Miguel–TNT rivalry =

Philippine Basketball Association rivalry

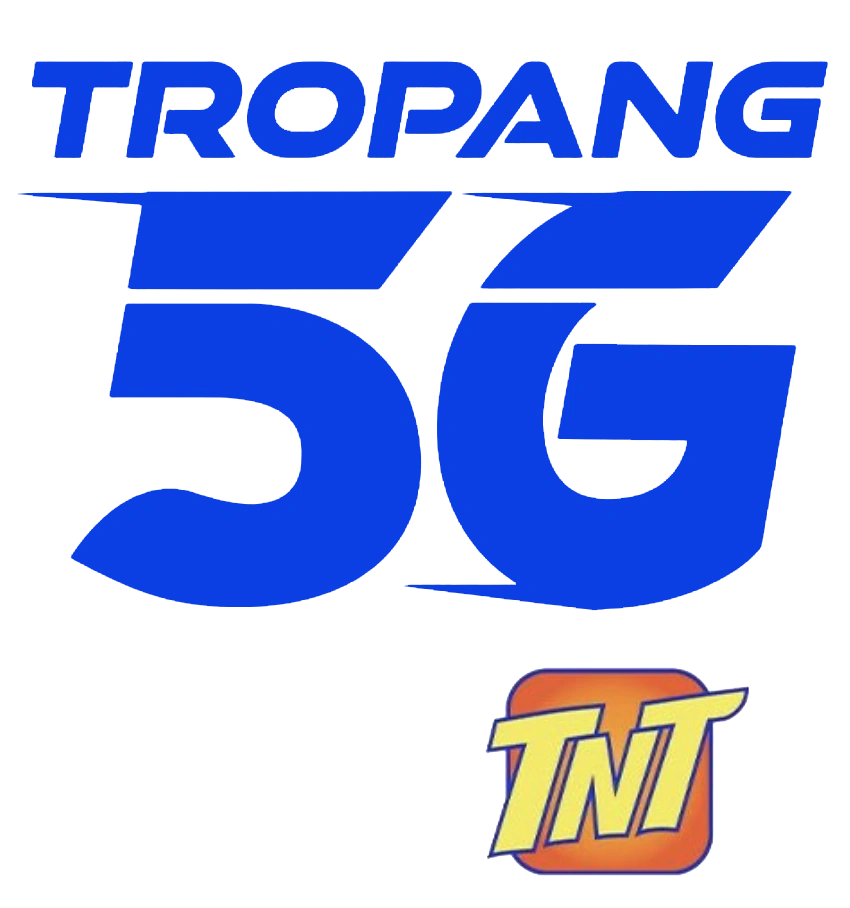
- TNT Tropang 5G
- Teams: San Miguel Beermen; TNT Tropang 5G
- First meeting: March 17, 1996; San Miguel 88, Mobiline 82
- Latest meeting: October 10, 2026; TNT 116, San Miguel 98 Ynares Center Antipolo
- Next meeting: TBD

Statistics
- Total meetings: 167 (since 1996)
- Postseason results: 50–39 (San Miguel)
- Current win streak: TNT W3

Postseason history
PBA Finals
- Series record: 7–1 (San Miguel leads)
- Win–loss record: 36–24 (San Miguel leads)
- 2005 PBA Fiesta Conference Finals San Miguel won, 4–1
- 2010–11 Philippine Cup Finals Talk 'N Text won, 4–2
- 2011 Governors' Cup Finals Petron Blaze won, 4–3
- 2017 Commissioner's Cup Finals San Miguel won, 4–2
- 2019 Commissioner's Cup Finals San Miguel won, 4–2
- 2022 Philippine Cup Finals San Miguel won, 4–3
- 2025 Philippine Cup Finals San Miguel won, 4–2
- 2026 Philippine Cup Finals San Miguel won, 4–2
PBA Playoffs
- Series record: 10–4 (San Miguel leads)
- Win–loss record: 27–19 (San Miguel leads)
- 1997 All-Filipino Cup Semifinal round San Miguel won, 1–0
- 1998 Commissioner's Cup Quarterfinals San Miguel won, 1–0
- 1998 Governors' Cup Semifinal round San Miguel won, 1–0
- 2000 All-Filipino Cup Quarterfinals San Miguel won, 1–0
- 2001 Commissioner's Cup Quarterfinals San Miguel won, 1–0
- 2001 Governors' Cup Quarterfinals San Miguel won, 1–0
- 2002 Governors' Cup Quarterfinals San Miguel won, 2–0
- 2008–09 Philippine Cup Semifinals Talk 'N Text won, 4–2
- 2011 Governors' Cup Round Robin Semifinals Talk 'N Text won, 1–0
- 2011–12 Philippine Cup Semifinals Talk 'N Text won, 4–3
- 2012 Governors' Cup Round Robin Semifinals Talk 'N Text won, 1–0
- 2013 Commissioner's Cup Quarterfinals Talk 'N Text won, 2–0
- 2014–15 Philippine Cup Semifinals San Miguel won, 4–0
- 2016–17 Philippine Cup Semifinals San Miguel won, 4–3
- 2017–18 Philippine Cup Quarterfinals San Miguel won, 1–0
- 2018 Commissioner's Cup Quarterfinals San Miguel won, 2–0
- 2019 Philippine Cup Quarterfinals San Miguel won, 2–1
- 2021 Philippine Cup Semifinals TNT won, 4–3

The San Miguel–TNT rivalry is a professional basketball rivalry in the PBA between the San Miguel Beermen and the TNT Tropang 5G. Known as the "Corporate War", it is a part of SMC–MVP rivalry since the San Miguel is owned by San Miguel Corporation and the TNT is part of the MVP Group. The rivalry is defined by San Miguel's role as the perennial "spoiler," having twice denied TNT a historic Grand Slam in 2011 and 2025.

== History ==
=== Prelude ===
The rivalry's roots trace back to 1996, when the Pepsi franchise was rebranded as Mobiline. In a bid to challenge San Miguel's hegemony, Mobiline hired former SMB coach Norman Black and signed SMB legend Alvin Teng.

==== 1998 Centennial Cup Semifinals ====
Mobiline achieved its first major playoff victory over San Miguel, winning a 1-0 knockout game to reach the finals.

==== The Giant Duel (2001–2005) ====
Throughout the mid-2000s, the two teams met frequently in the semifinals. The 2005–06 Fiesta Conference Semifinals served as a major prelude, where TNT outlasted San Miguel in a 7-game thriller. This era was defined by the clash of premier point guards: TNT's Jimmy Alapag and San Miguel's Olsen Racela.

The rivalry shifted to the frontcourt, featuring Asi Taulava (TNT) and Danny Ildefonso (SMB). In the 2005–06 Fiesta Conference Semifinals, TNT outlasted San Miguel in a classic 7-game series. San Miguel responded in the 2006–07 Philippine Cup Semifinals, eliminating TNT 4–2 behind the scoring of Danny Seigle.

=== The Rivalry erupted dub as "Bad Blood" ===
==== First Grand Slam Denial (2011) ====
The rivalry reached a boiling point during the 2010–11 season. After TNT defeated San Miguel in the Philippine Cup Finals, the teams met again in the Governors' Cup with history on the line.

The term "Bad Blood" became synonymous with this rivalry, marked by extreme physicality and coaching animosity between Chot Reyes and Ato Agustin.

==== 2010–11 Philippine Cup Finals ====
TNT secured its status as a powerhouse by defeating San Miguel 4–2.

==== 2011 Governors' Cup Finals ====
TNT entered the 2011 Governors' Cup Finals seeking the first Grand Slam in 15 years. They faced the Petron Blaze Boosters (a temporary rebranding of San Miguel). Petron was considered heavy underdogs due to injuries to Jay Washington and Lordy Tugade.

The series was characterized by extreme physicality and verbal spats between TNT's Chot Reyes and Petron's Ato Agustin. In a historic Game 7 on August 21, 2011, Petron shocked TNT with an 85–73 victory. The loss devastated the TNT franchise and birthed the "Bad Blood" moniker, as TNT fans and management felt the championship was "stolen" by a depleted but highly aggressive Petron squad. Petron's win remains the most famous upset in the rivalry's history, as it ended TNT's triple-crown aspirations.

==== The Fajardo-Death 5 Era (2014–2022) ====
San Miguel’s "Death 5" era established a period of dominance, though TNT remained their most consistent challenger.

==== 2014-15 Philippine Cup Semifinals ====
San Miguel met TNT in the Semifinals. San Miguel would sweep TNT in 4 games to advance to the finals (SMB won that conference).

==== 2017 & 2019 Commissioner's Cup Finals ====
SMB defeated TNT in both series (both 4–2). In 2017, SMB won the title with Best Player Chris Ross and Best Import Charles Rhodes against TNT in 6 games. The same would be in 2019, SMB overcame TNT's Best Import Terrence Jones behind a monster performance from Chris McCullough.

In both series, TNT always won Game 1, but SMB caught up, outscoring TNT by two games.

==== 2021 & 2022 Philippine Cup Battles ====
After years of San Miguel dominance in the "Death 5" era, TNT regained the All-Filipino title in 2021, Beating San Miguel in the Semifinals and Magnolia Hotshots in the Finals. The two met in the 2022 Philippine Cup Finals to settle the score. San Miguel, behind June Mar Fajardo and CJ Perez, defeated TNT in seven games (4–3), regaining their status as the kings of the All-Filipino conference.

==== 2025 Philippine Cup Finals—The Second Grand Slam Denial (2025) ====
In the 2024–25 season, history repeated itself. TNT won the Governors' Cup and the Commissioner's Cup, again putting them on the doorstep of a Grand Slam.

Mirroring 2011, San Miguel served as the final obstacle. On July 25, 2025, SMB defeated TNT 107–96 in Game 6 to clinch the title 4–2. Jericho Cruz was named Finals MVP, while June Mar Fajardo anchored the defense. This second denial solidified SMB's reputation as TNT's "Grand Slam Kryptonite."

==== PBA Season 50-Golden Jubilee Finals (2025–26) ====
The rivalry entered its 30th year during the PBA's 50th season. The teams met for their second consecutive All-Filipino Finals.

==== 2026 Philippine Cup Finals ====
San Miguel completed a back-to-back Philippine Cup defense, defeating TNT 4–2. In the clinching Game 6 on February 1, 2026, SMB overcame a late TNT lead with a 26–9 closing run to win 92–77. June Mar Fajardo made history as the first recipient of the Ramon Fernandez Trophy (Finals MVP) after a 29-point, 23-rebound masterpiece.

== Personnel who served for both teams ==
=== Local ===
- Alvin Teng
- Terrence Romeo
- Don Trollano
- Jericho Cruz
- Simon Enciso
- RR Garcia
- Justin Chua
- Victor Pablo
- Brian Heruela
- Nic Belasco
- Matt Ganuelas-Rosser
- David Semerad
- Yancy de Ocampo
- Moala Tautuaa
- Jay Washington
- Danny Seigle
- Rob Reyes
- Rabeh Al-Hussaini
- Nonoy Baclao
- Denok Miranda
- Avan Nava

=== Import ===
- Quincy Miller
- Chris McCullough

=== Coaches ===
- Tommy Manotoc
- Norman Black
- Chot Reyes
- Jong Uichico
- Nash Racela (assistant)
- Jimmy Alapag (Talk N' Text team manager in 2015, and San Miguel's assistant in 2019 to 2020)
- Derrick Pumaren (San Miguel's assistant in 1980s, and TNT head coach from 2006 to 2008)
