= Michael Gilmore (basketball) =

American basketball player

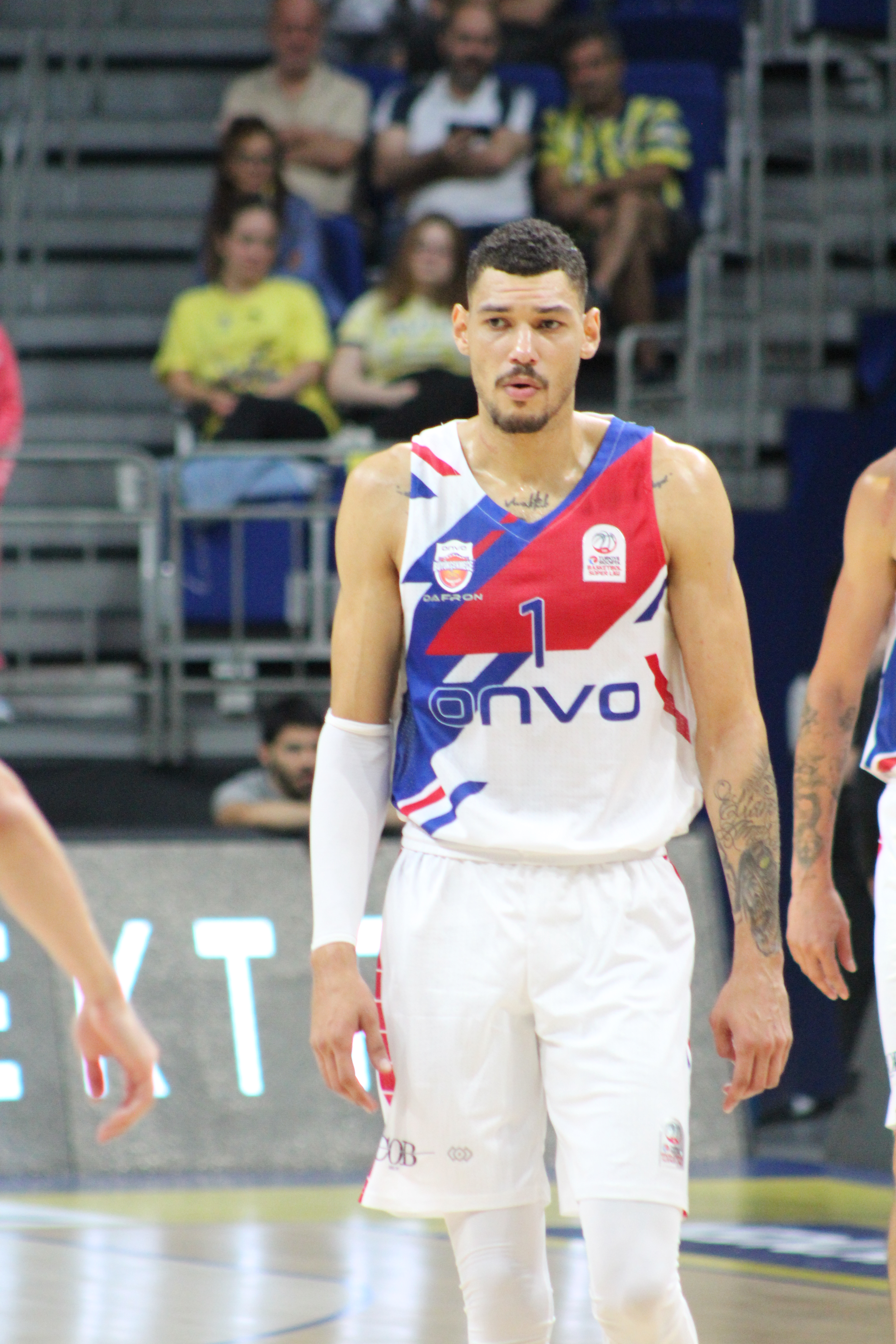
- Gilmore with Büyükçekmece Basketbol in 2024

Free agent
- Position: Power forward

Personal information
- Born: January 15, 1995 (age 31) Jacksonville, Florida, U.S.
- Listed height: 6 ft 10 in (2.08 m)
- Listed weight: 220 lb (100 kg)

Career information
- High school: James S. Rickards (Tallahassee, Florida)
- College: VCU (2014–2016); Florida Gulf Coast (2017–2018); VCU (2018–2019)
- NBA draft: 2019: undrafted
- Playing career: 2019–present

Career history
- 2019–2020: Phoenix Hagen
- 2020–2021: Oostende
- 2021–2022: Wisconsin Herd
- 2022: Raptors 905
- 2022: Rayos de Hermosillo
- 2022–2023: Luleå
- 2023–2024: PAOK Thessaloniki
- 2024: Openjobmetis Varese
- 2024: Liaoning Flying Leopards
- 2024: Büyükçekmece Basketbol
- 2025: UCC Assigeco Piacenza
- 2025–2026: Jiaozuo Cultural Tourism
- 2026: Titan Ultra Giant Risers
- 2026: Tycoon

Michael Earl Gilmore (born January 15, 1995) is an American-Belgian professional basketball player who last played for the Tycoon of the Hong Kong A1 Division Championship. He played college basketball for Virginia Commonwealth University (VCU) and for Florida Gulf Coast. He is the nephew of former NBA player Artis Gilmore.

== High school career ==
Gilmore attended James S. Rickards in Tallahassee, Florida.

== College career ==
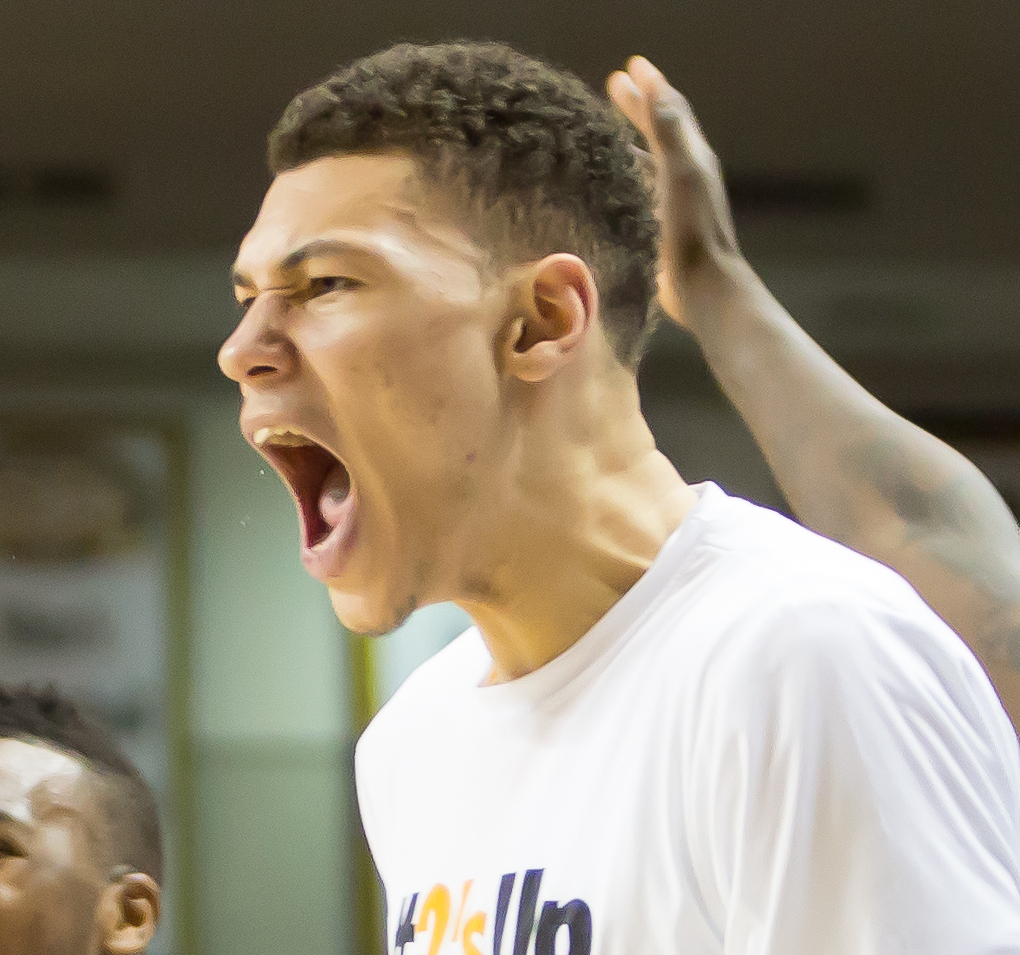
Gilmore with VCU.

Gilmore played three years of college basketball at Virginia Commonwealth University and one year in Florida Gulf Coast.

== Professional career ==
=== Phoienix Hagen ===
After going undrafted in the 2019 NBA draft, Gilmore joined Phoenix Hagen of the ProA.

=== Ostende ===
On December 30. 2020, Gilmore joined Oostende of the Belgian League

=== NBA G League and Mexico ===
After some brief stints with Wisconsin Herd and Raptors 905, Gilmore joined Rayos de Hermosillo in Mexico.

=== Lulea ===
For the 2022–2023 season, Gilmore joined Luleå of the Basketligan. He went on to average 18.1 points, 8.8 rebounds and 1.6 assists per game.

=== PAOK Thessaloniki ===
On August 14, 2023, he signed a one-year contract with PAOK Thessaloniki of the Greek Basket League.

=== Openjobmetis Varese ===
On March 21, 2024, Gilmore signed with Openjobmetis Varese of the Lega Basket Serie A.

=== Liaoning Flying Leopards ===
In June 2024, Gilmore signed with the Liaoning Flying Leopards for the 2024 Basketball Champions League Asia.

=== Büyükçekmece Basketbol ===
On October 3, 2024, he signed with ONVO Büyükçekmece of the Basketbol Süper Ligi (BSL).

=== UCC Assigeco Piacenza ===
On January 10, 2025, Gilmore signed with the UCC Assigeco Piacenza of the Serie A2.

=== Titan Ultra Giant Risers ===
On February 27, 2026, Gilmore signed with the Titan Ultra Giant Risers of the Philippine Basketball Association (PBA).

== National team career ==
Gilmore is a member of the senior Belgium men's national basketball team. His mother was born in Belgium, so he gained Belgium citizenship, and played for the men's team under coach Dario Gjergja.
