= SMC–MVP basketball rivalry =

Sports rivalry in the Philippines

SMC–MVP rivalry
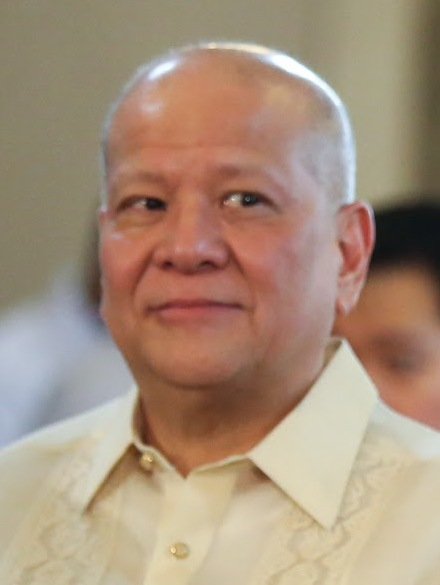
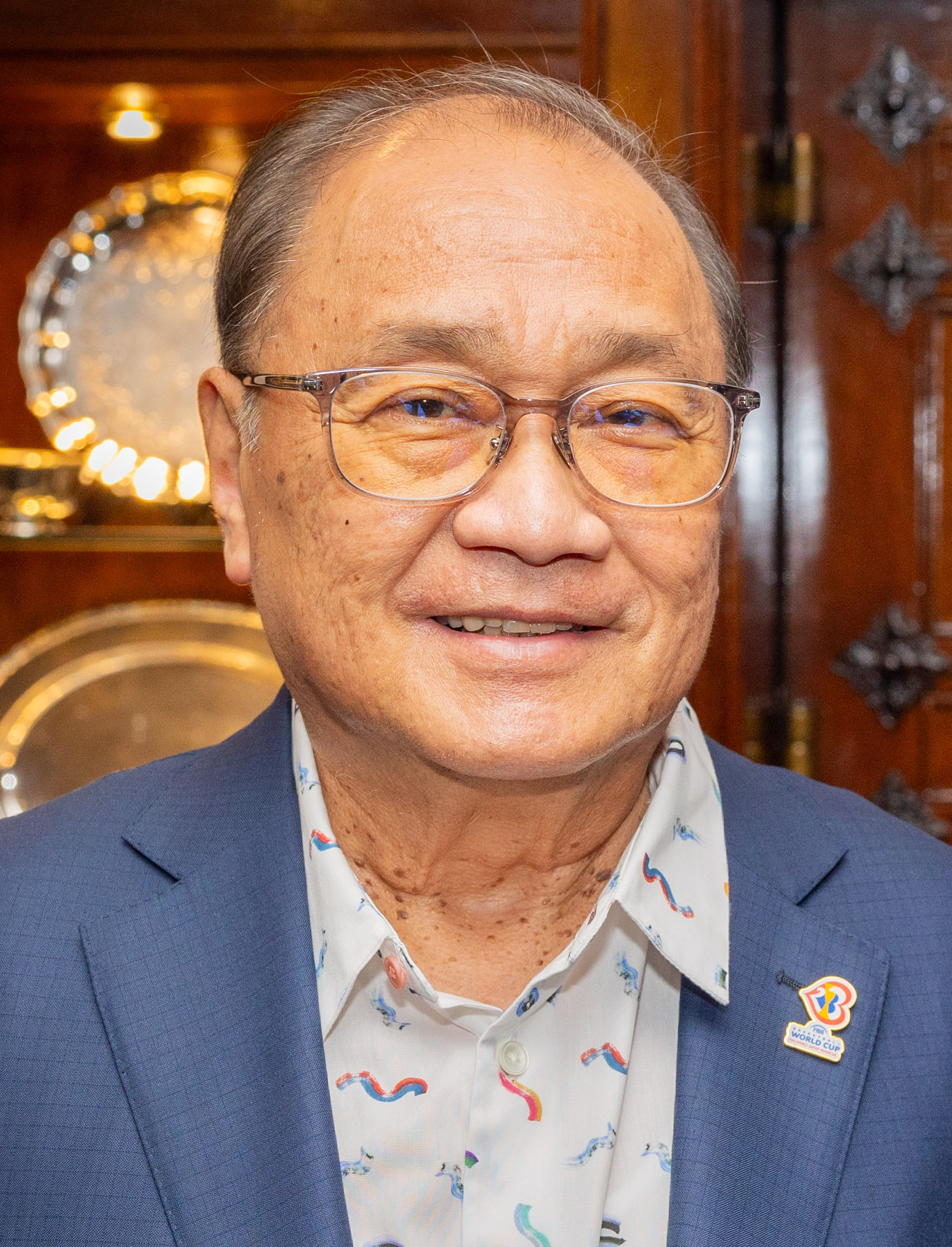
- SMC Group; San Miguel Beermen; Barangay Ginebra San Miguel; Magnolia Hotshots MVP Group; Meralco Bolts; TNT Tropang Giga; NLEX Road Warriors
- Sport: Basketball

The rivalry between the San Miguel Corporation (SMC) led by Ramon S. Ang (RSA) and the MVP Group led by Manuel V. Pangilinan (MVP) is a noted aspect of the Philippine Basketball Association's (PBA) modern history. This extends to the franchise teams the two groups own in the basketball league.

== Teams ==
The SMC and MVP groups owns three franchise teams each in the Philippine Basketball Association.

Group	Team	Company	Joined PBA	Team founded	Acquired by SMC/MVP (Note: Year when the franchise became under SMC/MVP if previously owned by a third party)
SMC	Barangay Ginebra San Miguel	Ginebra San Miguel, Inc.	1979		1984 (Note: Previously owned by La Tondeña, Inc. under the Gilbey's name)
SMC	Magnolia Hotshots	San Miguel Food and Beverage	1988	1986	2001 (Note: Via acquisition of Purefoods from the Ayala Corporation)
SMC	San Miguel Beermen	San Miguel Brewery, Inc.	1975		—N/a
MVP	Meralco Bolts	Manila Electric Company	2010	1968	— (Note: Entered the PBA through acquiring the franchise of Sta. Lucia Realtors)
MVP	NLEX Road Warriors	NLEX Corporation	2014	2011	— (Note: Entered the PBA through acquiring the franchise of Air21 Express)
MVP	TNT Tropang 5G	Smart Communications	1990		2001 (Note: Via acquisition of majority stake in the Pilipino Telephone Corporation (Piltel))

== Results ==
This list is only consists of results starting from the 2010–11 season, when the Meralco Bolts joined the league.

=== Elimination round ===
The numbers in parentheses indicate the teams actual ranking in the conference followed by their record.

SMC group team
MVP group team
Italics indicate team did not make playoffs

Season	Conference	1st	2nd	3rd	4th	5th	6th
2010–11	Philippine	Talk 'N Text (1st, 11–3)	San Miguel (2nd, 11–3)	Barangay Ginebra (3rd, 10–4)	B-Meg (4th, 7–7)	Meralco (5th, 7–7)	—N/a
2010–11	Commissioner's	Talk 'N Text (1st, 8–1)	Barangay Ginebra (3rd, 5–4)	B-Meg (7th, 4–5)	Meralco (8th, 3–6)	San Miguel (10th, 2–7)	—N/a
2010–11	Governors'	Talk 'N Text (1st, 6–2)	Petron (2nd, 5–3)	Barangay Ginebra (4th, 5–3)	B-Meg (6th, 4–4)	Meralco (8th, 3–5)	—N/a
2011–12	Philippine	B-Meg (1st, 10–4)	Talk 'N Text (2nd, 10–4)	Petron (3rd, 9–5)	Barangay Ginebra (4th, 9–5)	Meralco (6th, 8–6)	—N/a
2011–12	Commissioner's	Talk 'N Text (1st, 7–2)	Barangay Ginebra (2nd, 6–3)	B-Meg (3rd, 6–3)	Meralco (6th, 4–5)	Petron (9th, 3–6)	—N/a
2011–12	Governors'	B-Meg (2nd, 6–3)	Talk 'N Text (3rd, 5–4)	Barangay Ginebra (4th, 5–4)	Petron (5th, 5–4)	Meralco (6th, 4–5)	—N/a
2012–13	Philippine	Talk 'N Text (1st, 12–2)	San Mig (2nd, 10–4)	Meralco (4th, 8–6)	Barangay Ginebra (6th, 7–7)	Petron (7th, 6–8)	—N/a
2012–13	Commissioner's	Petron (3rd, 8–6)	San Mig (4th, 8–6)	Meralco (5th, 7–7)	Talk 'N Text (6th, 7–7)	Barangay Ginebra (7th, 7–7)	—N/a
2012–13	Governors'	Petron (1st, 8–1)	San Mig (2nd, 6–3)	Meralco (3rd, 5–4)	Barangay Ginebra (8th, 3–6)	Talk 'N Text (9th, 3–6)	—N/a
2013–14	Philippine	Barangay Ginebra (1st, 11–3)	Petron (3rd, 10–4)	Talk 'N Text (4th, 8–6)	San Mig (5th, 7–7)	Meralco (9th, 5–9)	—N/a
2013–14	Commissioner's	Talk 'N Text (1st, 9–0)	San Miguel (2nd, 7–2)	Meralco (5th, 5–4)	San Mig (6th, 4–5)	Barangay Ginebra (8th, 3–6)	—N/a
2013–14	Governors'	Talk 'N Text (1st, 7–2)	San Mig (4th, 5–4)	San Miguel (5th, 5–4)	Barangay Ginebra (6th, 5–4)	Meralco (9th, 3–6)	—N/a
2014–15	Philippine	San Miguel (1st, 9–2)	Talk 'N Text (4th, 8–3)	Barangay Ginebra (5th, 6–5)	Meralco (6th, 6–5)	Purefoods (7th, 6–5)	NLEX (10th, 4–7)
2014–15	Commissioner's	Talk 'N Text (2nd, 8–3)	Purefoods (3rd, 8–3)	NLEX (4th, 6–5)	Meralco (5th, 6–5)	Barangay Ginebra (8th, 5–6)	San Miguel (9th, 4–7)
2014–15	Governors'	San Miguel (2nd, 8–3)	Star (5th, 6–5)	Meralco (7th, 5–6)	Barangay Ginebra (8th, 5–6)	Talk 'N Text (10th, 5–6)	NLEX (11th, 3–8)
2015–16	Philippine	San Miguel (2nd, 9–2)	Barangay Ginebra (4th, 7–4)	TNT (6th, 6–5)	NLEX (7th, 5–6)	Star (9th, 4–7)	Meralco (12th, 1–10)
2015–16	Commissioner's	San Miguel (1st, 8–3)	Meralco (2nd, 8–3)	Barangay Ginebra (4th, 7–4)	TNT (6th, 6–5)	NLEX (7th, 5–6)	Star (8th, 5–6)
2015–16	Governors'	TNT (1st, 10–1)	San Miguel (2nd, 8–3)	Barangay Ginebra (3rd, 8–3)	Meralco (4th, 6–5)	NLEX (7th, 5–6)	Star (11th, 2–9)
2016–17	Philippine	San Miguel (1st, 10–1)	Star (3rd, 7–4)	TNT (4th, 6–5)	Barangay Ginebra (7th, 6–5)	Meralco (11th, 3–8)	NLEX (12th, 2–9)
2016–17	Commissioner's	Barangay Ginebra (1st, 9–2)	San Miguel (2nd, 9–2)	Star (3rd, 9–2)	TNT (4th, 8–3)	Meralco (5th, 7–4)	NLEX (12th, 2–9)
2016–17	Governors'	Meralco (1st, 9–2)	TNT (2nd, 8–3)	Barangay Ginebra (3rd, 8–3)	Star (4th, 7–4)	NLEX (5th, 7–4)	San Miguel (6th, 7–4)
2017–18	Philippine	San Miguel (1st, 8–3)	Magnolia (2nd, 8–3)	Barangay Ginebra (4th, 6–5)	NLEX (6th, 6–5)	TNT (8th, 5–6)	Meralco (11th, 4–7)
2017–18	Commissioner's	TNT (3rd, 8–3)	Meralco (4th, 7–4)	Barangay Ginebra (5th, 6–5)	San Miguel (6th, 6–5)	Magnolia (7th, 6–5)	NLEX (11th, 2–9)
2017–18	Governors'	Barangay Ginebra (1st, 9–2)	Magnolia (4th, 8–3)	San Miguel (6th, 6–5)	Meralco (7th, 5–6)	NLEX (8th, 5–6)	TNT (9th, 4–7)
2019	Philippine	Barangay Ginebra (3rd, 7–4)	TNT (4th, 7–4)	San Miguel (5th, 7–4)	Magnolia (6th, 6–5)	NLEX (9th, 4–7)	Meralco (11th, 3–8)
2019	Commissioner's	TNT (1st, 10–1)	Barangay Ginebra (4th, 7–4)	Magnolia (5th, 5–6)	San Miguel (7th, 5–6)	Meralco (9th, 4–7)	NLEX (12th, 3–8)
2019	Governors'	NLEX (1st, 8–3)	Meralco (2nd, 8–3)	TNT (3rd, 8–3)	Barangay Ginebra (4th, 7–4)	San Miguel (5th, 6–5)	Magnolia (6th, 6–5)
2020	Philippine	Barangay Ginebra (1st, 8–3)	TNT (3rd, 7–4)	San Miguel (4th, 7–4)	Meralco (5th, 7–4)	Magnolia (7th, 7–4)	NLEX (9th, 5–6)
2021	Philippine	TNT (1st, 10–1)	Meralco (2nd, 9–2)	Magnolia (3rd, 8–3)	San Miguel (4th, 7–4)	NLEX (7th, 5–6)	Barangay Ginebra (8th, 4–7)
2021	Governors'	Magnolia (1st, 9–2)	NLEX (2nd, 8–3)	TNT (3rd, 7–4)	Meralco (4th, 7–4)	San Miguel (5th, 7–4)	Barangay Ginebra (6th, 6–5)
2022–23	Philippine	San Miguel (1st, 9–2)	TNT (2nd, 8–3)	Magnolia (3rd, 8–3)	Barangay Ginebra (4th, 8–3)	Meralco (5th, 7–4)	NLEX (6th, 6–5)
2022–23	Commissioner's	Magnolia (2nd, 10–2)	Barangay Ginebra (3rd, 9–3)	San Miguel (5th, 7–5)	NLEX (9th, 5–7)	Meralco (10th, 4–8)	TNT (11th, 4–8)
2022–23	Governors'	TNT (1st, 10–1)	San Miguel (2nd, 9–2)	Barangay Ginebra (3rd, 8–3)	Meralco (4th, 7–4)	Magnolia (5th, 7–4)	NLEX (6th, 7–4)
2023–24	Commissioner's	Magnolia (1st, 9–2)	San Miguel (2nd, 8–3)	Barangay Ginebra (3rd, 8–3)	Meralco (5th, 8–3)	TNT (8th, 5–6)	NLEX (9th, 4–7)
2023–24	Philippine	San Miguel (1st, 10–1)	Barangay Ginebra (2nd, 7–4)	Meralco (3rd, 6–5)	TNT (4th, 6–5)	NLEX (6th, 6–5)	Magnolia (7th, 6–5)
2024–25	Governors'	TNT (1st in Group A, 8–2)	Meralco (2nd in Group A, 7–3)	San Miguel (2nd in Group B, 6–4)	Barangay Ginebra (3rd in Group B, 6–4)	Magnolia (4th in Group A, 5–5)	NLEX (4th in Group B, 4–7)
2024–25	Commissioner's	TNT (2nd, 9–3)	Barangay Ginebra (4th, 8–4)	Meralco (5th, 7–5)	Magnolia (8th, 6–6)	NLEX (9th, 6–6)	San Miguel (10th, 8–3)
2024–25	Philippine	San Miguel (1st, 8–3)	NLEX (2nd, 8–3)	Magnolia (3rd, 8–3)	Barangay Ginebra (4th, 8–3)	TNT (6th, 6–5)	Meralco (8th, 6–5)
2025–26	Philippine	San Miguel (1st, 9–2)	TNT (2nd, 8–3)	Barangay Ginebra (5th, 7–4)	Magnolia (6th, 6–5)	Meralco (7th, 6–5)	NLEX (8th, 6–5)
2025–26	Commissioner's	NLEX (1st, 10–2)	Barangay Ginebra (2nd, 9–3)	Meralco (4th, 8–4)	Magnolia (5th, 7–5)	San Miguel (6th, 6–6)	TNT (8th, 6–6)

=== Finals ===
Won by a team from the SMC group
Won by a team from the MVP group
Won by a team from neither group

Season	Conference	Champion	Series	Runner-Up	Winning coach
2010–11	Philippine	Talk 'N Text	4–2	San Miguel	Chot Reyes
2010–11	Commissioner's	Talk 'N Text	4–2	Barangay Ginebra	Chot Reyes
2010–11	Governors'	Petron	4–3	Talk 'N Text	Ato Agustin
2011–12	Philippine	Talk 'N Text	4–1	Powerade	Chot Reyes
2011–12	Commissioner's	B-Meg	4–3	Talk 'N Text	Tim Cone
2011–12	Governors'	Rain or Shine	4–3	B-Meg	Yeng Guiao
2012–13	Philippine	Talk 'N Text	4–0	Rain or Shine	Norman Black
2012–13	Commissioner's	Alaska	3–0	Barangay Ginebra	Luigi Trillo
2012–13	Governors'	San Mig Coffee	4–3	Petron	Tim Cone
2013–14	Philippine	San Mig Coffee	4–2	Rain or Shine	Tim Cone
2013–14	Commissioner's	San Mig Coffee	3–1	Talk 'N Text	Tim Cone
2013–14	Governors'	San Mig Coffee	3–2	Rain or Shine	Tim Cone
2014–15	Philippine	San Miguel	4–3	Alaska	Leo Austria
2014–15	Commissioner's	Talk 'N Text	4–3	Rain or Shine	Jong Uichico
2014–15	Governors'	San Miguel	4–0	Alaska	Leo Austria
2015–16	Philippine	San Miguel	4–3	Alaska	Leo Austria
2015–16	Commissioner's	Rain or Shine	4–2	Alaska	Yeng Guiao
2015–16	Governors'	Barangay Ginebra	4–2	Meralco	Tim Cone
2016–17	Philippine	San Miguel	4–1	Barangay Ginebra	Leo Austria
2016–17	Commissioner's	San Miguel	4–2	TNT	Leo Austria
2016–17	Governors'	Barangay Ginebra	4–3	Meralco	Tim Cone
2017–18	Philippine	San Miguel	4–1	Magnolia	Leo Austria
2017–18	Commissioner's	Barangay Ginebra	4–2	San Miguel	Tim Cone
2017–18	Governors'	Magnolia	4–2	Alaska	Chito Victolero
2019	Philippine	San Miguel	4–3	Magnolia	Leo Austria
2019	Commissioner's	San Miguel	4–2	TNT	Leo Austria
2019	Governors'	Barangay Ginebra	4–1	Meralco	Tim Cone
2020	Philippine	Barangay Ginebra	4–1	TNT	Tim Cone
2021	Philippine	TNT	4–1	Magnolia	Chot Reyes
2021	Governors'	Barangay Ginebra	4–2	Meralco	Tim Cone
2022–23	Philippine	San Miguel	4–3	TNT	Leo Austria
2022–23	Commissioner's	Barangay Ginebra	4–3	Bay Area	Tim Cone
2022–23	Governors'	TNT	4–2	Barangay Ginebra	Jojo Lastimosa
2023–24	Commissioner's	San Miguel	4–2	Magnolia	Jorge Gallent
2023–24	Philippine	Meralco	4–2	San Miguel	Luigi Trillo
2024–25	Governors'	TNT	4–2	Barangay Ginebra	Chot Reyes
2024–25	Commissioner's	TNT	4–3	Barangay Ginebra	Chot Reyes
2024–25	Philippine	San Miguel	4–2	TNT	Leo Austria
2025–26	Philippine	San Miguel	4–2	TNT	Leo Austria
2025–26	Commissioner's	Barangay Ginebra	4–3	TNT	Tim Cone

== Effect on the league ==
In 2023, Dennis Anthony Uy who owns the Converge FiberXers has attributed the "duopoly" or dominance of the two groups to the declining attendance in the PBA. Wilfred Uytengsu of the now-defunct Alaska franchise has long urged for a "level playing field" for the PBA's 12 franchise teams. During the Season 48 draft, coach Yeng Guiao of the Rain or Shine Elasto Painters has asked for other teams to strengthen and develop their respective lineups. Guiao also stressed that top picks in the draft may end up in the SMC and MVP teams in future conferences.

As of the 2026 Commissioner's Cup, only Alaska and Rain or Shine are the teams not affiliated to the SMC or MVP groups to have won a title across the 34 conferences that were held since 2010. Since the 2016 Governors' Cup, those titles were only won by teams from those two groups.

In the PBA Board, the SMC and MVP groups have multiple votes in issues. Since 2014, the two groups have three votes each (one for each team). For basketball-related issues, the two groups only have two votes each. The six other independent teams also have their own voting power in the board.

The existence of multiple teams under the SMC and MVP groups has been subject to criticism itself; three teams each, with two more other having "ties" with SMC. Alfrancis Chua insist that the maintenance of multiple or sister team is essential to keep the membership count in the PBA.
