= MVP Group =

Philippine conglomerate

MVP Group of Companies
- Type: Conglomerate
- Industry: Telecommunications, Utilities, Infrastructure, Healthcare
- Founded: 1981; 45 years ago (via First Pacific)
- Founder: Manuel V. Pangilinan
- Headquarters: Makati, Metro Manila
- Area served: Philippines, Southeast Asia
- Key people: Manuel V. Pangilinan (Chairman and CEO)
- Products: Fixed-line and mobile telephony, broadband, electricity distribution, water services, toll roads, hospital services
- Revenue: ▲ ₱500+ Billion (Group aggregate est.)
- Subsidiaries: PLDT Inc. Smart Communications; Metro Pacific Investments Corporation (MPIC); Meralco; Maynilad Water Services; TV5 Network Inc.
- Website: www.pldt.com / www.mpic.com.ph

The MVP Group of Companies is a Philippine conglomerate associated with Filipino businessman Manny Pangilinan. It operates as a loosely linked network of companies primarily held through First Pacific Company Limited (Hong Kong-based) and its Philippine investment arm, Metro Pacific Investments Corporation (MPIC). The group holds dominant positions in essential services, including telecommunications, energy, water, toll roads, and healthcare.

== History ==
The group's origins trace back to 1981, when Manny V. Pangilinan (MVP) co-founded First Pacific Company Limited in Hong Kong with the support of the Salim family of Indonesia.

In 1987 Metro Pacific was established as First Pacific's investment vehicle in the Philippines.

In 1998 The group made its most significant move by acquiring a controlling stake in PLDT, the country's dominant telecommunications provider.

2006–Present: Under the leadership of Pangilinan, the group pivoted toward infrastructure. MPIC was reorganized to focus on "nation-building" sectors, acquiring the NLEX tollway, Maynilad Water, and taking a major stake in Meralco from the Lopez Family.

=== Core Business ===
==== Telecommunications and Digital Services ====
Managed primarily through PLDT Inc., the group's most profitable arm:

- PLDT: The Philippines' largest fully integrated telco.
- Smart Communications: The group's wireless and mobile service provider.
- Maya (formerly PayMaya): The group's digital banking and fintech arm.

==== Energy and Power ====
The group controls the distribution of electricity in Metro Manila and surrounding provinces:

- Manila Electric Company (Meralco): The largest private electric distribution utility in the Philippines.
- Meralco PowerGen (MGen): Focuses on power generation, including renewable energy initiatives like Meralco Terra Solar Farm.

==== Infrastructure and Tollways ====
Operated under Metro Pacific Tollways Corporation (MPTC), the group manages the largest network of toll roads in the country:

- NLEX & SCTEX: Connecting Metro Manila to Central and Northern Luzon.
- CAVITEX & CALAX: Southern Luzon expressways.
- CCLEC: The Cebu-Cordova Link Expressway.

==== Water Utilities ====
- Maynilad Water Services: Provides water and sewerage services to the West Zone of Metro Manila.
- MetroPac Water Investments: Handles water projects in provincial areas and Vietnam.

==== Healthcare (Metro Pacific Health) ====
The group operates the largest private hospital network in the Philippines, with over 20 hospitals including:

- Makati Medical Center
- Cardinal Santos Medical Center
- Asian Hospital and Medical Center
- Davao Doctors Hospital

==== Media and Content ====
Held through MediaQuest Holdings, the group has a significant footprint in Philippine media:

- TV5 Network Inc.: The nation's third-largest television and radio network and media company.
- Nation Broadcasting Corporation: The television and radio network.
- Philstar Media Group & BusinessWorld: Major print and digital news outlets.
- Cignal TV: The leading direct-to-home (DTH) satellite provider.

==== Philanthropy and Sports ====
The group is well known for its heavy investment in Philippine sports and social development:

- MVP Sports Foundation: Supports national athletes in boxing, weightlifting, gymnastics and other sports.
- Philippine Basketball Association Teams: Owns the TNT Tropang 5G, Meralco Bolts, and NLEX Road Warriors.
- Foundations: Operates the PLDT-Smart Foundation and One Meralco Foundation for CSR initiatives.
