= 2025–26 PBA Philippine Cup =

First conference of the 2025–26 PBA season

- Duration: October 5, 2025 – February 1, 2026
- TV partner(s): RPTV; PBA Rush (HD)
- Streaming partner(s): Cignal Play; Pilipinas Live; One Sports YouTube Channel

Finals
- Champions: San Miguel Beermen
- Runners-up: TNT Tropang 5G

Awards
- Best Player: June Mar Fajardo (San Miguel Beermen)
- Finals MVP: June Mar Fajardo (San Miguel Beermen)

PBA Philippine Cup chronology
- < 2025

PBA conference chronology
- < 2025 Philippine Cup 2026 Commissioner's >

The 2025–26 PBA Philippine Cup, also referred to as the PBA season 50 Philippine Cup, was the first conference of the 2025–26 PBA season of the Philippine Basketball Association (PBA). The 50th PBA Philippine Cup started on October 5, 2025 and ended on February 1, 2026. A break was held from November 17 to December 4 to make way for the first window of 2027 FIBA Basketball World Cup qualifiers. The tournament does not allow teams to hire foreign players or imports.

This is the first conference of the Titan Ultra Giant Risers in the league, following Pureblends Corporation's acquisition of the NorthPort Batang Pier franchise. The San Miguel Beermen entered this conference as the defending Philippine Cup champions, and successfully defended the title in a rematch of the last year's finals against the TNT Tropang 5G.

== Format ==
- All participating teams play in a single round-robin elimination, with each team playing 11 games throughout the duration of the conference.
- Teams are ranked by win-loss records with the top eight teams advancing to the playoffs. Any ties are broken using tiebreaker criteria.
  - Beginning with this conference, there will no longer be a one-game playoff for the eighth seed in case of a tie. The standard tiebreakers will be used instead.
- The playoff formats are as follows:
  - Quarterfinals (higher seeds twice-to-beat):
    - QF1: #1 vs #8
    - QF2: #2 vs #7
    - QF3: #3 vs #6
    - QF4: #4 vs #5
  - Semifinals (best-of-seven series):
    - SF1: QF1 winner vs. QF4 winner
    - SF2: QF2 winner vs. QF3 winner
  - Finals (best-of-seven series)

== Elimination round ==
=== Team standings ===
Pos	Team	W	L	PCT	GB	Qualification
1	San Miguel Beermen	9	2	.818	—	Twice-to-beat in the quarterfinals
2	Rain or Shine Elasto Painters	8	3	.727 (Note: Head-to-head record: Rain or Shine 1–0 TNT)	1	Twice-to-beat in the quarterfinals
3	TNT Tropang 5G	8	3	.727	1	Twice-to-beat in the quarterfinals
4	Converge FiberXers	7	4	.636 (Note: Head-to-head record: Converge 1–0 Barangay Ginebra)	2	Twice-to-beat in the quarterfinals
5	Barangay Ginebra San Miguel	7	4	.636	2	Twice-to-win in the quarterfinals
6	Magnolia Chicken Timplados Hotshots	6	5	.545 (Note: Head-to-head quotient: Magnolia 1.09, Meralco 0.99, NLEX 0.93)	3	Twice-to-win in the quarterfinals
7	Meralco Bolts	6	5	.545	3	Twice-to-win in the quarterfinals
8	NLEX Road Warriors	6	5	.545	3	Twice-to-win in the quarterfinals
9	Titan Ultra Giant Risers	4	7	.364	5	
10	Phoenix Fuel Masters	3	8	.273	6	
11	Blackwater Bossing	1	10	.091 (Note: Head-to-head record: Blackwater 1–0 Terrafirma)	8	
12	Terrafirma Dyip	1	10	.091	8	

Source: PBA.ph
Rules for classification: 1) winning percentage; 2) head-to-head goal average (quotient); 3) head-to-head record; 4) overall quotient; 5) coin toss

=== Results table ===
Team	Game										
Team	1	2	3	4	5	6	7	8	9	10	11
Barangay Ginebra (BGSM)	MAG; 73–80	TNT; 92–77	MER; 75–89	SMB; 81–83	NLEX; 104–74	CON; 96–106	PHX; 102–93	BWB; 103–85	TER; 108–77	ROS; 102–100	TGR; 108–105
Blackwater (BWB)	TER; 107–87	MER; 96–105	ROS; 100–110	NLEX; 88–99	TGR; 86–97	CON; 94–99	MAG; 75–90	PHX; 98–106	BGSM; 85–103	SMB; 92–116	TNT; 96–113
Converge (CON)	TGR; 129–92	TNT; 103–110	TER; 125–108	PHX; 128–114	SMB; 90–96	BWB; 99–94	BGSM; 106–96	MAG; 114–97	ROS; 84–90	MER; 84–105	NLEX; 107–95*
Magnolia (MAG)	BGSM; 80–73	TGR; 127–119	MER; 76–78	TER; 104–93	PHX; 83–80	SMB; 92–94	BWB; 90–75	CON; 97–114	NLEX; 98–82	ROS; 92–101	TNT; 83–94
Meralco (MER)	TGR; 96–100	ROS; 95–96*	BWB; 105–96	BGSM; 89–75	MAG; 78–76	NLEX; 85–89	TNT; 98–100*	TER; 120–87	PHX; 88–78	CON; 105–84	SMB; 104–113
NLEX	SMB; 85–84	TER; 91–97	PHX; 87–81	MER; 89–85	BWB; 99–88	BGSM; 74–104	ROS; 105–91	TGR; 92–83	MAG; 82–98	TNT; 100–119	CON; 95–107*
Phoenix (PHX)	TNT; 78–93	SMB; 109–103	NLEX; 81–87	CON; 114–128	MAG; 80–83	ROS; 80–91	TER; 107–76	BGSM; 93–102	BWB; 106–98	MER; 78–88	TGR; 119–127
Rain or Shine (ROS)	MER; 96–95*	SMB; 93–111	BWB; 110–100	TGR; 112–111	TER; 106–91	PHX; 91–80	NLEX; 91–105	TNT; 91–89	CON; 90–84	MAG; 101–92	BGSM; 100–102
San Miguel (SMB)	NLEX; 84–85	PHX; 103–109	ROS; 111–93	BGSM; 83–81	CON; 96–90	MAG; 94–92	TGR; 158–117	TNT; 110–95	BWB; 116–92	TER; 135–115	MER; 113–104
Terrafirma (TER)	BWB; 87–107	NLEX; 97–91	CON; 108–125	MAG; 93–104	ROS; 91–106	TNT; 95–109*	PHX; 76–107	TGR; 108–111	MER; 87–120	BGSM; 77–108	SMB; 115–135
Titan Ultra (TGR)	MER; 100–96	CON; 92–129	MAG; 119–127	TNT; 92–130	ROS; 111–112	BWB; 97–86	SMB; 117–158	NLEX; 83–92	TER; 111–108	PHX; 127–119	BGSM; 105–108
TNT	PHX; 93–78	BGSM; 77–92	CON; 110–103	TGR; 130–92	MER; 100–98*	TER; 109–95*	ROS; 89–91	SMB; 95–110	NLEX; 119–100	BWB; 113–96	MAG; 94–83

Source: PBA.ph
Legend: Blue = win; Red = loss; Matches with lighter background shading were decided after overtime. (*) Number of asterisks denotes number of overtime periods

== Bracket ==
Quarterfinals (Top 4 twice-to-beat)
1	San Miguel	101
8	NLEX	94
4	Converge	85	98
5	Barangay Ginebra	105	99*
2	Rain or Shine	79	89
7	Meralco	96	98
3	TNT	118
6	Magnolia	109

Semifinals (Best-of-7)
1	San Miguel	4
5	Barangay Ginebra	2
7	Meralco	1
3	TNT	4

Finals (Best-of-7)
1	San Miguel	4
3	TNT	2

*Game went into overtime

== Quarterfinals ==
The top four seeds have the twice-to-beat advantage; they have to be beaten twice, while their opponents just once, to advance.

=== (1) San Miguel vs. (8) NLEX ===
RPTV

December 25, 2025
5:15 pm

Box score

San Miguel Beermen 101, NLEX Road Warriors 94
Scoring by quarter: 28–29, 19–24, 32–19, 22–22
Pts: Fajardo 26; Rebs: Fajardo 23; Asts: Fajardo 6	Pts: Bolick 31; Rebs: Bolick 10; Asts: Bolick 7
San Miguel wins series in one game

Araneta Coliseum, Quezon City
Referees: Peter Balao, Jerry Narandan, Kenny Hallig, Karlo Vergara

=== (2) Rain or Shine vs. (7) Meralco ===
RPTV

December 27, 2025
5:15 pm

Box score

Rain or Shine Elasto Painters 79, Meralco Bolts 96
Scoring by quarter: 15–35, 16–23, 29–20, 19–18
Pts: Nocum 17; Rebs: Norwood 9 Asts: Tiongson 3	Pts: three players 14; Rebs: Cansino 8 Asts: Banchero 6

Araneta Coliseum, Quezon City
Referees: Peter Balao, Irewin Traballo, James Paez, Jerome Gay

RPTV

December 29, 2025
7:30 pm

Box score

Rain or Shine Elasto Painters 89, Meralco Bolts 98
Scoring by quarter: 26–20, 11–23, 22–23, 30–32
Pts: Nocum 29; Rebs: Tiongson 13; Asts: Caracut 4	Pts: Newsome 31; Rebs: Hodge 10; Asts: Newsome 5
Meralco wins series in two games

Araneta Coliseum, Quezon City
Referees: Rommel Gruta, Mike Flordeliza, Kenny Hallig, Jerome Gay

=== (3) TNT vs. (6) Magnolia ===
RPTV

December 27, 2025
7:30 pm

Box score

TNT Tropang 5G 118, Magnolia Chicken Timplados Hotshots 109
Scoring by quarter: 32–16, 20–25, 29–32, 37–36
Pts: Oftana 25; Rebs: Ganuelas-Rosser 9 Asts: Nambatac, Oftana 5	Pts: Lucero 22; Rebs: Lucero 13; Asts: Barroca 13
TNT wins series in one game

Araneta Coliseum, Quezon City
Referees: Rommel Gruta, Mike Flordeliza, Janine Nicandro, Jayson Vipinoso

=== (4) Converge vs. (5) Barangay Ginebra ===
RPTV

December 25, 2025
7:30 pm

Box score

Converge FiberXers 85, Barangay Ginebra San Miguel 105
Scoring by quarter: 21–23, 21–18, 22–29, 21–35
Pts: Baltazar 19; Rebs: Baltazar 13; Asts: Arana 6	Pts: Abarrientos 35; Rebs: Thompson 12; Asts: Thompson 10

Araneta Coliseum, Quezon City
Referees: Rommel Gruta, Mardy Montoya, Janine Nicandro, Albert Nubla

RPTV

December 28, 2025
7:30 pm

Box score

Converge FiberXers 98, Barangay Ginebra San Miguel 99 (OT)
Scoring by quarter: 21–19, 19–20, 20–29, 26–18, Overtime: 12–13
Pts: Gómez de Liaño 25; Rebs: Baltazar 20; Asts: Stockton 6	Pts: Abarrientos 20; Rebs: Rosario 14; Asts: Thompson 8
Barangay Ginebra wins series in two games

Araneta Coliseum, Quezon City
Referees: Peter Balao, Mike Flordeliza, Jerry Narandan, Charlie Amparado

== Semifinals ==
=== (1) San Miguel vs. (5) Barangay Ginebra ===
RPTV

January 4, 2026
7:30 pm

Box score

San Miguel Beermen 90, Barangay Ginebra San Miguel 99
Scoring by quarter: 18–26, 28–22, 27–24, 17–27
Pts: Fajardo 27; Rebs: Fajardo 23; Asts: Ross 5	Pts: Abarrientos 23; Rebs: Holt, Rosario 7 Asts: Abarrientos 7

Araneta Coliseum, Quezon City
Referees: Peter Balao, Bing Oliva, Janine Nicandro, Jayson Vipinoso

RPTV

January 7, 2026
5:15 pm

Box score

San Miguel Beermen 93, Barangay Ginebra San Miguel 84
Scoring by quarter: 12–19, 22–23, 31–21, 28–21
Pts: Fajardo 21; Rebs: Fajardo 23; Asts: Tautuaa 4	Pts: Abarrientos, Holt 18; Rebs: Rosario 9 Asts: Holt 5

Araneta Coliseum, Quezon City
Referees: Rommel Gruta, Bing Oliva, James Paez, Jerome Gay

RPTV

January 9, 2026
7:30 pm

Box score

San Miguel Beermen 91, Barangay Ginebra San Miguel 85
Scoring by quarter: 26–21, 21–20, 27–22, 17–22
Pts: Trollano 33; Rebs: Fajardo 19; Asts: Ross 8	Pts: Thompson 17; Rebs: Rosario 10; Asts: Thompson 4

Araneta Coliseum, Quezon City
Referees: Rommel Gruta, Bing Oliva, Jerry Narandan, John Francis Mira

RPTV

January 11, 2026
5:15 pm

Box score

San Miguel Beermen 91, Barangay Ginebra San Miguel 105
Scoring by quarter: 36–26, 19–30, 20–16, 16–33
Pts: Perez 22; Rebs: Fajardo 20; Asts: Fajardo 5	Pts: Thompson 35; Rebs: Thompson 11; Asts: Thompson 11

SM Mall of Asia Arena, Pasay
Referees: Rommel Gruta, Bing Oliva, Mardy Montoya, Cherwill Solon

RPTV

January 14, 2026
7:30 pm

Box score

San Miguel Beermen 115, Barangay Ginebra San Miguel 109
Scoring by quarter: 25–26, 33–23, 32–29, 25–31
Pts: Fajardo 21; Rebs: Fajardo 11; Asts: Ross 8	Pts: Thompson 20; Rebs: Thompson 7 Asts: Abarrientos, Thompson 7

Araneta Coliseum, Quezon City
Referees: Peter Balao, Mike Flordeliza, Jerry Narandan, Kenny Hallig

RPTV

January 16, 2026
7:30 pm

Box score

San Miguel Beermen 101, Barangay Ginebra San Miguel 88
Scoring by quarter: 39–25, 24–22, 16–24, 22–17
Pts: Perez 41; Rebs: Fajardo 18; Asts: three players 4	Pts: Thompson 24; Rebs: Thompson 9 Asts: Abarrientos 5
San Miguel wins series, 4–2

Araneta Coliseum, Quezon City
Referees: Peter Balao, Mardy Montoya, Mike Flordeliza, Albert Nubla

=== (3) TNT vs. (7) Meralco ===
RPTV

January 4, 2026
5:15 pm

Box score

TNT Tropang 5G 100, Meralco Bolts 95
Scoring by quarter: 26–38, 20–24, 28–13, 26–20
Pts: Oftana 28; Rebs: Ganuelas-Rosser 10; Asts: five players 2	Pts: Banchero 16; Rebs: Black 6 Asts: Quinto 7

Araneta Coliseum, Quezon City
Referees: Rommel Gruta, Mike Flordeliza, Kenny Hallig, Cherwill Solon

RPTV

January 7, 2026
7:30 pm

Box score

TNT Tropang 5G 109, Meralco Bolts 92
Scoring by quarter: 29–19, 28–27, 25–20, 27–26
Pts: Oftana 26; Rebs: Oftana 7 Asts: Nambatac 5	Pts: Hodge, Newsome 18; Rebs: Almazan, Hodge 7 Asts: Newsome 4

Araneta Coliseum, Quezon City
Referees: Peter Balao, Jerry Narandan, Irewin Traballo, Karlo Vergara

RPTV

January 9, 2026
5:15 pm

Box score

TNT Tropang 5G 89, Meralco Bolts 97
Scoring by quarter: 15–21, 23–26, 25–23, 26–27
Pts: Pogoy 28; Rebs: Williams 7 Asts: Nambatac, Pogoy 3	Pts: Banchero, Cansino 18; Rebs: Almazan, Quinto 8 Asts: Newsome 5

Araneta Coliseum, Quezon City
Referees: Mike Flordeliza, Irewin Traballo, James Paez, Jayson Vipinoso

RPTV

January 11, 2026
7:30 pm

Box score

TNT Tropang 5G 102, Meralco Bolts 83
Scoring by quarter: 20–19, 25–19, 27–18, 30–27
Pts: Erram 27; Rebs: Erram 9 Asts: Enciso 6	Pts: Banchero 19; Rebs: Hodge 8 Asts: Quinto 4

SM Mall of Asia Arena, Pasay
Referees: Peter Balao, Mike Flordeliza, Jeffrey Tantay, Karlo Vergara

RPTV

January 14, 2026
5:15 pm

Box score

TNT Tropang 5G 99, Meralco Bolts 96
Scoring by quarter: 30–22, 16–28, 29–22, 24–24
Pts: Heading 31; Rebs: Galinato 8 Asts: Heading 5	Pts: Cansino 36; Rebs: Hodge 14; Asts: Black 8
TNT wins series, 4–1

Araneta Coliseum, Quezon City
Referees: Rommel Gruta, Bing Oliva, Jeffrey Tantay, James Paez

== Finals ==
RPTV

January 21, 2026
7:30 pm

Box score

San Miguel Beermen 91, TNT Tropang 5G 96

Ynares Center, Antipolo, Rizal

RPTV

January 23, 2026
7:30 pm

Box score

San Miguel Beermen 111, TNT Tropang 5G 92

Ynares Center, Antipolo, Rizal

RPTV

January 25, 2026
7:30 pm

Box score

San Miguel Beermen 95, TNT Tropang 5G 89

SM Mall of Asia Arena, Pasay

RPTV

January 28, 2026
7:35 pm

Box score

San Miguel Beermen 87, TNT Tropang 5G 110

SM Mall of Asia Arena, Pasay

RPTV

January 30, 2026
7:30 pm

Box score

San Miguel Beermen 96, TNT Tropang 5G 82

Ynares Center, Antipolo, Rizal

RPTV

February 1, 2026
7:30 pm

Box score

San Miguel Beermen 92, TNT Tropang 5G 77
San Miguel wins series, 4–2

SM Mall of Asia Arena, Pasay

== Awards ==
=== Players of the Week ===
Week	Player	Ref.
October 5–12	Juan Gómez de Liaño (Converge FiberXers)	
October 15–19	CJ Cansino (Meralco Bolts)	
October 22–26	Juan Gómez de Liaño (Converge FiberXers)	
October 29 – November 2	Rey Nambatac (TNT Tropang 5G)	
November 5–8	Don Trollano (San Miguel Beermen)	
November 12–16	Robert Bolick (NLEX Road Warriors)	
November 12–16	Juan Gómez de Liaño (Converge FiberXers)	
December 5–7	CJ Perez (San Miguel Beermen)	
December 10–14	CJ Cansino (Meralco Bolts)	
December 15–21	Juan Gómez de Liaño (Converge FiberXers)	
December 25–29	RJ Abarrientos (Barangay Ginebra San Miguel)	
January 4–11	Scottie Thompson (Barangay Ginebra San Miguel)	
January 14–16	CJ Perez (San Miguel Beermen)	

== Statistics ==
=== Individual statistical leaders ===
Category	Player	Team	Statistic
Points per game	Calvin Abueva	Titan Ultra Giant Risers	23.6
Rebounds per game	June Mar Fajardo	San Miguel Beermen	14.6
Assists per game	Robert Bolick	NLEX Road Warriors	8.6
Steals per game	CJ Perez	San Miguel Beermen	2.0
Blocks per game	Zavier Lucero	Magnolia Chicken Timplados Hotshots	2.2
Turnovers per game	Calvin Abueva	Titan Ultra Giant Risers	3.9
Fouls per game	Brandon Bates	Meralco Bolts	4.1
Minutes per game	Zavier Lucero	Magnolia Chicken Timplados Hotshots	36.8
FG%	James Una	Blackwater Bossing	72.7%
FT%	James Una	Blackwater Bossing	100.0%
3FG%	Jansen Rios	Meralco Bolts	85.7%
4FG%	Rey Nambatac	TNT Tropang 5G	54.5%
Double-doubles	June Mar Fajardo	San Miguel Beermen	18
Triple-doubles	Juan Gómez de Liaño	Converge FiberXers	3

=== Individual game highs ===
Category	Player	Team	Statistic
Points	Calvin Abueva	Titan Ultra Giant Risers	41
Points	CJ Perez	San Miguel Beermen	41
Rebounds	June Mar Fajardo	San Miguel Beermen	27
Assists	Mark Nonoy	Terrafirma Dyip	13
Assists	Mark Barroca	Magnolia Chicken Timplados Hotshots	13
Steals	three players		6
Blocks	Brandon Ganuelas-Rosser	TNT Tropang 5G	5
Three point field goals	Kelly Williams	TNT Tropang 5G	8
Four point field goals	four players		3

=== Team statistical leaders ===
Category	Team	Statistic
Points per game	San Miguel Beermen	109.4
Rebounds per game	Rain or Shine Elasto Painters	55.1
Assists per game	Converge FiberXers	24.1
Steals per game	Titan Ultra Giant Risers	9.5
Blocks per game	TNT Tropang 5G	4.6
Turnovers per game	Barangay Ginebra San Miguel	15.7
Fouls per game	Meralco Bolts	25.2
FG%	Converge FiberXers	46.1%
FT%	TNT Tropang 5G	74.6%
3FG%	Converge FiberXers	35.8%
4FG%	TNT Tropang 5G	38.3%
