= 2025–26 Barangay Ginebra San Miguel season =

- Head coach: Tim Cone
- General manager: Alfrancis Chua; Raymond Rodriguez (assistant)
- Governor: Alfrancis Chua
- Owners: Ginebra San Miguel, Inc. (a San Miguel Corporation subsidiary)

Philippine Cup results
- Record: 7–4 (63.6%)
- Place: 5th
- Playoff finish: Semifinalist (lost to San Miguel, 2–4)

Commissioner's Cup results
- Record: 9–3 (75%)
- Place: 2nd
- Playoff finish: Champions (Defeated TNT, 4–3)

Governors' Cup results
- Record: 5–5 (50%)
- Place: 3rd in group B
- Playoff finish: TBD

Barangay Ginebra San Miguel seasons

The 2025–26 Barangay Ginebra San Miguel season is the 46th season of the franchise in the Philippine Basketball Association (PBA).

== Key dates ==
- September 7, 2025: The PBA season 50 draft was held at the SM Mall of Asia Music Hall in Pasay.

== Draft picks ==
| Round | Pick | Player | Position | Place of birth | College |
|---|---|---|---|---|---|
| 1 | 11 | Sonny Estil | SF | Philippines | Letran |
| 2 | 13 | Mario Barasi | C | Philippines | Adamson |
| 2 | 23 | John Abis | SF | Philippines | Perpetual |

== Roster ==
Barangay Ginebra San Miguel roster
Players
Coaches

| Pos. | # | POB | Name | Height | Weight | DOB (YYYY–MM–DD) | From |
|---|---|---|---|---|---|---|---|
| F/C | 1 | (Philippines) | Troy Rosario | 6 ft 7 in (2.01 m) | 218 lb (99 kg) | 1992–01–20 | National-U |
| G/F | 2 | (United States) | Jeremiah Gray | 6 ft 5 in (1.96 m) | 205 lb (93 kg) | 1996–08–16 | Dominican (CA) |
| F | 3 | (United States) | Jordan Murphy (GI) | 6 ft 6 in (1.98 m) | 250 lb (113 kg) | 1997–02–28 | Minnesota |
| G | 4 | (Philippines) | RJ Abarrientos | 5 ft 11 in (1.80 m) | 174 lb (79 kg) | 1999–09–14 | Far Eastern |
| G | 9 | (Philippines) | Scottie Thompson | 6 ft 1 in (1.85 m) | 180 lb (82 kg) | 1993–07–12 | UPHSD |
| G | 10 | (Philippines) | John Pinto | 5 ft 11 in (1.80 m) | 170 lb (77 kg) | 1990–10–15 | Arellano |
| C | 11 | (Philippines) | Isaac Go | 6 ft 7 in (2.01 m) | 230 lb (104 kg) | 1996–06–07 | Ateneo |
| G/F | 14 | (United States) | Stephen Holt | 6 ft 4 in (1.93 m) | 195 lb (88 kg) | 1991–12–06 | Saint Mary's |
| F | 18 | (Philippines) | Ralph Cu | 6 ft 4 in (1.93 m) | 210 lb (95 kg) | 1997–03–08 | De La Salle |
| F | 22 | (Philippines) | John Abis (R) | 6 ft 3 in (1.91 m) | 209 lb (95 kg) | 2000–10–14 | UPHSD |
| F/C | 23 | (Philippines) | Raymond Aguilar | 6 ft 4 in (1.93 m) | 200 lb (91 kg) | 1985–07–27 | National-U |
| G/F | 24 | (Philippines) | Jayson David (injured) | 6 ft 3 in (1.91 m) | 191 lb (87 kg) | 1996–11–08 | Lyceum |
| C | 25 | (Philippines) | Japeth Aguilar | 6 ft 9 in (2.06 m) | 235 lb (107 kg) | 1987–01–25 | Western Kentucky |
| F/C | 29 | (Canada) | Norbert Torres | 6 ft 6 in (1.98 m) | 250 lb (113 kg) | 1990–01–12 | De La Salle |
| F | 32 | (United States) | Justin Brownlee (injured) (GI) | 6 ft 6 in (1.98 m) | 220 lb (100 kg) | 1988–04–23 | St. John's |
| F/C | 33 | (Philippines) | Kemark Cariño | 6 ft 9 in (2.06 m) | 203 lb (92 kg) | 1998–02–01 | San Beda |
| F | 34 | (Philippines) | Sonny Estil (R) | 6 ft 3 in (1.91 m) | | 2001–06–28 | Letran |

Head coach

- (United States) Tim Cone

Assistant coach(es)

- (Philippines) Richard del Rosario (1st assistant)
- (Philippines) Johnny Abarrientos
- (Philippines) Jamil Lipae
- (Philippines) Patrick Partosa
- (Philippines) Olsen Racela

Team manager

- (Philippines) Alfrancis Chua^{[a]}
- (Philippines) Raymond Rodriguez (assistant)

Legend

- (C) Team captain
- (CI) Commissioner's Cup Import
- (GI) Governors' Cup Import
- (EI) EASL Import
- (DP) Unsigned draft pick
- (FA) Free agent
- (IN) Inactive
- (S) Suspended
- (R) Rookie
- Injured

Roster

- ^{a} Also serves as Barangay Ginebra's board governor.

== Philippine Cup ==
=== Eliminations ===
==== Standings ====
| Pos | Team | W | L | PCT | GB | Qualification |
|---|---|---|---|---|---|---|
| 1 | San Miguel Beermen | 9 | 2 | .818 | — | Twice-to-beat in the quarterfinals |
| 2 | Rain or Shine Elasto Painters | 8 | 3 | .727 (Note: Head-to-head record: Rain or Shine 1–0 TNT) | 1 | Twice-to-beat in the quarterfinals |
| 3 | TNT Tropang 5G | 8 | 3 | .727 | 1 | Twice-to-beat in the quarterfinals |
| 4 | Converge FiberXers | 7 | 4 | .636 (Note: Head-to-head record: Converge 1–0 Barangay Ginebra) | 2 | Twice-to-beat in the quarterfinals |
| 5 | Barangay Ginebra San Miguel | 7 | 4 | .636 | 2 | Twice-to-win in the quarterfinals |
| 6 | Magnolia Chicken Timplados Hotshots | 6 | 5 | .545 (Note: Head-to-head quotient: Magnolia 1.09, Meralco 0.99, NLEX 0.93) | 3 | Twice-to-win in the quarterfinals |
| 7 | Meralco Bolts | 6 | 5 | .545 | 3 | Twice-to-win in the quarterfinals |
| 8 | NLEX Road Warriors | 6 | 5 | .545 | 3 | Twice-to-win in the quarterfinals |
| 9 | Titan Ultra Giant Risers | 4 | 7 | .364 | 5 | |
| 10 | Phoenix Fuel Masters | 3 | 8 | .273 | 6 | |
| 11 | Blackwater Bossing | 1 | 10 | .091 (Note: Head-to-head record: Blackwater 1–0 Terrafirma) | 8 | |
| 12 | Terrafirma Dyip | 1 | 10 | .091 | 8 | |

Source: PBA.ph
Rules for classification: 1) winning percentage; 2) head-to-head goal average (quotient); 3) head-to-head record; 4) overall quotient; 5) coin toss

==== Game log ====
2025–26 PBA Philippine Cup game log
Total: 7–4
October: 1–3

| Game | Date | Opponent | Score | High points | High rebounds | High assists | Location Attendance | Record |
|---|---|---|---|---|---|---|---|---|
| 1 | October 5, 2025 | Magnolia | L 73–80 | Stephen Holt (16) | Stephen Holt (17) | Abarrientos, Holt (4) | Smart Araneta Coliseum | 0–1 |
| 2 | October 15, 2025 | TNT | W 92–77 | Japeth Aguilar (17) | Troy Rosario (13) | Scottie Thompson (9) | Smart Araneta Coliseum | 1–1 |
| 3 | October 17, 2025 | Meralco | L 75–89 | RJ Abarrientos (14) | Scottie Thompson (9) | Jeremiah Gray (4) | Smart Araneta Coliseum | 1–2 |
| 4 | October 26, 2025 | San Miguel | L 81–83 | Japeth Aguilar (20) | Japeth Aguilar (12) | Scottie Thompson (7) | Coca-Cola Arena | 1–3 |

November: 2–1

| Game | Date | Opponent | Score | High points | High rebounds | High assists | Location Attendance | Record |
|---|---|---|---|---|---|---|---|---|
| 5 | November 2, 2025 | NLEX | W 104–74 | Japeth Aguilar (25) | Troy Rosario (11) | Scottie Thompson (11) | Ynares Center Antipolo | 2–3 |
| 6 | November 14, 2025 | Converge | L 96–106 | Abarrientos, Holt (24) | Troy Rosario (9) | Scottie Thompson (8) | Smart Araneta Coliseum | 2–4 |
| 7 | November 16, 2025 | Phoenix | W 102–93 | RJ Abarrientos (25) | Scottie Thompson (10) | Scottie Thompson (6) | Quadricentennial Pavilion | 3–4 |

December: 4–0

| Game | Date | Opponent | Score | High points | High rebounds | High assists | Location Attendance | Record |
|---|---|---|---|---|---|---|---|---|
| 8 | December 10, 2025 | Blackwater | W 103–85 | RJ Abarrientos (15) | Jayson David (8) | Ralph Cu (5) | Ynares Center Antipolo | 4–4 |
| 9 | December 12, 2025 | Terrafirma | W 108–77 | Jayson David (16) | Jayson David (8) | Abarrientos, Cu, Thompson (6) | Ninoy Aquino Stadium | 5–4 |
| 10 | December 17, 2025 | Rain or Shine | W 102–100 | RJ Abarrientos (25) | Japeth Aguilar (12) | RJ Abarrientos (4) | Khalifa Sports City Arena | 6–4 |
| 11 | December 21, 2025 | Titan Ultra | W 108–105 | Stephen Holt (27) | Scottie Thompson (6) | Scottie Thompson (9) | Smart Araneta Coliseum | 7–4 |

=== Playoffs ===
==== Bracket ====
Quarterfinals (Top 4 twice-to-beat)
1 | San Miguel | 101
8 | NLEX | 94
4 | Converge | 85 | 98
5 | Barangay Ginebra | 105 | 99*
2 | Rain or Shine | 79 | 89
7 | Meralco | 96 | 98
3 | TNT | 118
6 | Magnolia | 109

Semifinals (Best-of-7)
1 | San Miguel | 4
5 | Barangay Ginebra | 2
7 | Meralco | 1
3 | TNT | 4

Finals (Best-of-7)
1 | San Miguel | 4
3 | TNT | 2

*Game went into overtime

==== Game log ====
2025–26 PBA Philippine Cup playoffs game log
Total: 4–4
Quarterfinals: 2–0

| Game | Date | Opponent | Score | High points | High rebounds | High assists | Location Attendance | Series |
|---|---|---|---|---|---|---|---|---|
| 1 | December 25, 2025 | Converge | W 105–85 | RJ Abarrientos (35) | Scottie Thompson (12) | Scottie Thompson (10) | Smart Araneta Coliseum | 1–0 |
| 2 | December 28, 2025 | Converge | W 99–98 (OT) | RJ Abarrientos (20) | Troy Rosario (14) | Scottie Thompson (8) | Smart Araneta Coliseum | 2–0 |

Semifinals: 2–4

| Game | Date | Opponent | Score | High points | High rebounds | High assists | Location Attendance | Series |
|---|---|---|---|---|---|---|---|---|
| 1 | January 4, 2026 | San Miguel | W 99–90 | RJ Abarrientos (23) | Holt, Rosario (7) | RJ Abarrientos (7) | Smart Araneta Coliseum | 1–0 |
| 2 | January 7, 2026 | San Miguel | L 84–93 | Abarrientos, Holt (18) | Troy Rosario (9) | Stephen Holt (5) | Smart Araneta Coliseum | 1–1 |
| 3 | January 9, 2026 | San Miguel | L 85–91 | Scottie Thompson (17) | Troy Rosario (10) | Scottie Thompson (4) | Smart Araneta Coliseum | 1–2 |
| 4 | January 11, 2026 | San Miguel | W 105–91 | Scottie Thompson (35) | Scottie Thompson (11) | Scottie Thompson (11) | SM Mall of Asia Arena | 2–2 |
| 5 | January 14, 2026 | San Miguel | L 109–115 | Scottie Thompson (20) | Scottie Thompson (7) | Abarrientos, Thompson (7) | Smart Araneta Coliseum | 2–3 |
| 6 | January 16, 2026 | San Miguel | L 88–101 | Scottie Thompson (24) | Scottie Thompson (9) | RJ Abarrientos (5) | Smart Araneta Coliseum | 2–4 |

== Commissioner's Cup ==
=== Eliminations ===
==== Standings ====
| Pos | Team | W | L | PCT | GB | Qualification |
|---|---|---|---|---|---|---|
| 1 | NLEX Road Warriors | 10 | 2 | .833 | — | Twice-to-beat in the quarterfinals |
| 2 | Barangay Ginebra San Miguel | 9 | 3 | .750 (Note: Head-to-head record: Barangay Ginebra 1–0 Rain or Shine) | 1 | Twice-to-beat in the quarterfinals |
| 3 | Rain or Shine Elasto Painters | 9 | 3 | .750 | 1 | Twice-to-beat in the quarterfinals |
| 4 | Meralco Bolts | 8 | 4 | .667 | 2 | Twice-to-beat in the quarterfinals |
| 5 | Magnolia Chicken Timplados Hotshots | 7 | 5 | .583 (Note: Head-to-head record: Magnolia 1–0 San Miguel) | 3 | Twice-to-win in the quarterfinals |
| 6 | San Miguel Beermen | 7 | 5 | .583 | 3 | Twice-to-win in the quarterfinals |
| 7 | Phoenix Super LPG Fuel Masters | 6 | 6 | .500 (Note: Head-to-head record: Phoenix Super LPG 1–0 TNT) | 4 | Twice-to-win in the quarterfinals |
| 8 | TNT Tropang 5G | 6 | 6 | .500 | 4 | Twice-to-win in the quarterfinals |
| 9 | Converge FiberXers | 5 | 7 | .417 | 5 | |
| 10 | Terrafirma Dyip | 4 | 8 | .333 | 6 | |
| 11 | Macau Black Knights (G) | 3 | 9 | .250 | 7 | |
| 12 | Titan Ultra Giant Risers | 2 | 10 | .167 (Note: Head-to-head record: Titan Ultra 1–0 Blackwater) | 8 | |
| 13 | Blackwater Bossing | 2 | 10 | .167 | 8 | |

Source: PBA.ph
Rules for classification: 1) winning percentage; 2) head-to-head goal average (quotient); 3) head-to-head record; 4) overall quotient; 5) coin toss
(G) Guests

==== Game log ====
2026 PBA Commissioner's Cup game log
Total: 9–3
March: 2–1

| Game | Date | Opponent | Score | High points | High rebounds | High assists | Location Attendance | Record |
|---|---|---|---|---|---|---|---|---|
| 1 | March 20, 2026 | Macau | W 110–93 | Justin Brownlee (31) | Justin Brownlee (10) | RJ Abarrientos (7) | Smart Araneta Coliseum | 1–0 |
| 2 | March 27, 2026 | NLEX | L 113–118 | Justin Brownlee (46) | Japeth Aguilar (7) | Abarrientos, Brownlee (8) | Smart Araneta Coliseum | 1–1 |
| 3 | March 29, 2026 | Converge | W 99–93 | Justin Brownlee (33) | Troy Rosario (13) | Scottie Thompson (5) | Smart Araneta Coliseum | 2–1 |

April: 5–1

| Game | Date | Opponent | Score | High points | High rebounds | High assists | Location Attendance | Record |
|---|---|---|---|---|---|---|---|---|
| 4 | April 5, 2026 | San Miguel | L 82–85 | Justin Brownlee (31) | Isaac Go (8) | RJ Abarrientos (7) | Smart Araneta Coliseum | 2–2 |
| 5 | April 10, 2026 | Magnolia | W 91–89 | Justin Brownlee (29) | Scottie Thompson (10) | Justin Brownlee (4) | SM Mall of Asia Arena | 3–2 |
| 6 | April 12, 2026 | Phoenix Super LPG | W 109–96 | Justin Brownlee (30) | Troy Rosario (10) | Scottie Thompson (6) | Smart Araneta Coliseum | 4–2 |
| 7 | April 18, 2026 | Terrafirma | W 111–103 | Justin Brownlee (28) | Justin Brownlee (9) | Scottie Thompson (6) | Ynares Center Montalban | 5–2 |
| 8 | April 24, 2026 | Blackwater | W 115–108 | Justin Brownlee (21) | Troy Rosario (10) | Abarrientos, Thompson (7) | Smart Araneta Coliseum | 6–2 |
| 9 | April 26, 2026 | Titan Ultra | W 119–107 | Justin Brownlee (35) | Troy Rosario (13) | Scottie Thompson (9) | Smart Araneta Coliseum | 7–2 |

May: 2–1

| Game | Date | Opponent | Score | High points | High rebounds | High assists | Location Attendance | Record |
|---|---|---|---|---|---|---|---|---|
| 10 | May 1, 2026 | Meralco | L 91–112 | RJ Abarrientos (24) | Troy Rosario (7) | Justin Brownlee (6) | Smart Araneta Coliseum; 12,711 | 7–3 |
| 11 | May 3, 2026 | Rain or Shine | W 114–90 | Justin Brownlee (40) | Scottie Thompson (16) | RJ Abarrientos (11) | Smart Araneta Coliseum | 8–3 |
| 12 | May 10, 2026 | TNT | W 93–86 | Justin Brownlee (18) | Justin Brownlee (15) | Scottie Thompson (7) | SM Mall of Asia Arena; 13,967 | 9–3 |

=== Playoffs ===
==== Bracket ====
Quarterfinals (Top 4 twice-to-beat)
1 | NLEX | 93 | 112
8 | TNT | 96 | 118
4 | Meralco | 89 | 105
5 | Magnolia | 95 | 102*
2 | Barangay Ginebra | 112
7 | Phoenix Super LPG | 81
3 | Rain or Shine | 113
6 | San Miguel | 104

Semifinals (Best-of-7)
8 | TNT | 4
4 | Meralco | 2
2 | Barangay Ginebra | 4
3 | Rain or Shine | 2

Finals (Best-of-7)
8 | TNT | 3
2 | Barangay Ginebra | 4

*Game went into overtime

==== Game log ====
2026 PBA Commissioner's Cup playoffs game log
Total: 9–5
Quarterfinals: 1–0

| Game | Date | Opponent | Score | High points | High rebounds | High assists | Location Attendance | Series |
|---|---|---|---|---|---|---|---|---|
| 1 | May 15, 2026 | Phoenix Super LPG | W 112–81 | Justin Brownlee (24) | Scottie Thompson (9) | Scottie Thompson (9) | Ynares Center Antipolo | 1–0 |

Semifinals: 4–2

| Game | Date | Opponent | Score | High points | High rebounds | High assists | Location Attendance | Series |
|---|---|---|---|---|---|---|---|---|
| 1 | May 20, 2026 | Rain or Shine | L 111–115 | Justin Brownlee (32) | Troy Rosario (13) | Justin Brownlee (5) | Ynares Center Antipolo; 10,412 | 0–1 |
| 2 | May 22, 2026 | Rain or Shine | W 109–101 | Justin Brownlee (31) | Justin Brownlee (15) | Justin Brownlee (8) | SM Mall of Asia Arena; 11,522 | 1–1 |
| 3 | May 24, 2026 | Rain or Shine | W 103–98 | Scottie Thompson (25) | Justin Brownlee (8) | Justin Brownlee (9) | SM Mall of Asia Arena; 13,524 | 2–1 |
| 4 | May 27, 2026 | Rain or Shine | L 85–97 | Justin Brownlee (27) | J. Aguilar, Brownlee (10) | Justin Brownlee (4) | Smart Araneta Coliseum; 14,615 | 2–2 |
| 5 | May 29, 2026 | Rain or Shine | W 111–104 | Justin Brownlee (32) | Gray, Holt, Rosario (7) | RJ Abarrientos (8) | Smart Araneta Coliseum; 11,779 | 3–2 |
| 6 | May 31, 2026 | Rain or Shine | W 118–107 | Justin Brownlee (31) | Justin Brownlee (15) | RJ Abarrientos (7) | Ynares Center Antipolo; 11,321 | 4–2 |

Finals: 4–3

| Game | Date | Opponent | Score | High points | High rebounds | High assists | Location Attendance | Series |
|---|---|---|---|---|---|---|---|---|
| 1 | June 3, 2026 | TNT | W 102–100 | RJ Abarrientos (24) | Troy Rosario (9) | Justin Brownlee (8) | Smart Araneta Coliseum; 11,447 | 1–0 |
| 2 | June 5, 2026 | TNT | L 94–101 | Justin Brownlee (24) | Justin Brownlee (15) | Abarrientos, Brownlee, Cu, Pinto (3) | Smart Araneta Coliseum; 11,510 | 1–1 |
| 3 | June 7, 2026 | TNT | W 116–102 | Justin Brownlee (41) | Scottie Thompson (11) | Scottie Thompson (11) | SM Mall of Asia Arena; 18,607 | 2–1 |
| 4 | June 10, 2026 | TNT | L 98–106 | Justin Brownlee (32) | J. Aguilar, Brownlee, Thompson (5) | Justin Brownlee (5) | Smart Araneta Coliseum; 16,823 | 2–2 |
| 5 | June 12, 2026 | TNT | W 100–95 (OT) | Justin Brownlee (54) | Justin Brownlee (14) | Justin Brownlee (5) | Smart Araneta Coliseum; 18,039 | 3–2 |
| 6 | June 14, 2026 | TNT | L 90–98 | Justin Brownlee (52) | Troy Rosario (15) | Abarrientos, Thompson (5) | Smart Araneta Coliseum; 22,731 | 3–3 |
| 7 | June 17, 2026 | TNT | W 88–76 | Justin Brownlee (30) | Justin Brownlee (14) | Scottie Thompson (8) | SM Mall of Asia Arena; 24,617 | 4–3 |

== Governors' Cup ==
=== Eliminations ===
==== Standings ====
| Pos | Team | W | L | PCT | GB | Qualification |
|---|---|---|---|---|---|---|
| 1 | Magnolia Chicken Timplados Hotshots | 7 | 3 | .700 | — | Quarterfinals |
| 2 | Rain or Shine Elasto Painters | 6 | 4 | .600 | 1 | Quarterfinals |
| 3 | Barangay Ginebra San Miguel | 5 | 5 | .500 (Note: Head-to-head quotient: Barangay Ginebra 1.08, Phoenix Super LPG 0.92) | 2 | Quarterfinals |
| 4 | Phoenix Super LPG Fuel Masters | 5 | 5 | .500 | 2 | Quarterfinals |
| 5 | Meralco Bolts | 4 | 6 | .400 | 3 | |
| 6 | Blackwater Bossing | 3 | 7 | .300 | 4 | |

Source: PBA.ph
Rules for classification: 1) winning percentage; 2) head-to-head quotient (goal average); 3) head-to-head record; 4) coin toss

==== Game log ====
2026 PBA Governors' Cup game log
Total: 5–5
July: 2–2

| Game | Date | Opponent | Score | High points | High rebounds | High assists | Location Attendance | Record |
|---|---|---|---|---|---|---|---|---|
| 1 | July 19, 2026 | Phoenix Super LPG | L 78–81 | Riley Grigsby (42) | Riley Grigsby (13) | RJ Abarrientos (4) | Smart Araneta Coliseum | 0–1 |
| 2 | July 24, 2026 | Blackwater | W 115–85 | Stephen Holt (19) | Riley Grigsby (8) | Ralph Cu (7) | Smart Araneta Coliseum | 1–1 |
| 3 | July 26, 2026 | Rain or Shine | L 99–110 | Riley Grigsby (25) | Riley Grigsby (9) | RJ Abarrientos (8) | Smart Araneta Coliseum | 1–2 |
| 4 | July 31, 2026 | Meralco | W 84–75 | RJ Abarrientos (27) | Riley Grigsby (9) | Ralph Cu (4) | SM Mall of Asia Arena | 2–2 |

August: 0–2

| Game | Date | Opponent | Score | High points | High rebounds | High assists | Location Attendance | Record |
|---|---|---|---|---|---|---|---|---|
| 5 | August 2, 2026 | Magnolia | L 73–88 | Stephen Holt (17) | Abis, Cu, Grigsby, Holt (5) | Riley Grigsby (5) | Smart Araneta Coliseum | 2–3 |
| 6 | August 14, 2026 | Meralco | L 88–97 | Riley Grigsby (34) | Riley Grigsby (10) | Scottie Thompson (5) | Smart Araneta Coliseum | 2–4 |

October: 3–1

| Game | Date | Opponent | Score | High points | High rebounds | High assists | Location Attendance | Record |
|---|---|---|---|---|---|---|---|---|
| 7 | October 9, 2026 | Rain or Shine | W 129–111 | RJ Abarrientos (34) | Jordan Murphy (13) | RJ Abarrientos (9) | Ninoy Aquino Stadium | 3–4 |
| 8 | October 11, 2026 | Magnolia | L 93–112 | Jordan Murphy (18) | Jordan Murphy (7) | Ralph Cu (8) | Smart Araneta Coliseum | 3–5 |
| 9 | October 18, 2026 | Phoenix Super LPG | W 106–89 | Scottie Thompson (29) | Jordan Murphy (13) | Scottie Thompson (6) | Ynares Center Antipolo | 4–5 |
| 10 | October 23, 2026 | Blackwater | W 101–96 | Jordan Murphy (22) | Jordan Murphy (9) | Scottie Thompson (6) | Ynares Center Antipolo | 5–5 |

=== Playoffs ===
==== Bracket ====
Quarterfinals (Best-of-5)
A1 | NLEX | 3
B4 | Phoenix Super LPG | 0
B2 | Rain or Shine | 1
A3 | Converge | 3
B1 | Magnolia | 0
A4 | TNT | 3
A2 | San Miguel | 2
B3 | Barangay Ginebra | 3

Semifinals (Best-of-5)
A1 | NLEX | 0
A3 | Converge | 0
A4 | TNT | 0
B3 | Barangay Ginebra | 0

Finals (Best-of-7)
A

==== Game log ====
2026 PBA Governors' Cup playoffs game log
Total: 3–2
Quarterfinals: 3–2

| Game | Date | Opponent | Score | High points | High rebounds | High assists | Location Attendance | Series |
|---|---|---|---|---|---|---|---|---|
| 1 | October 27, 2026 | San Miguel | W 104–95 | Jordan Murphy (29) | Murphy, Thompson (11) | Abarrientos, Thompson (6) | Smart Araneta Coliseum | 1–0 |
| 2 | October 30, 2026 | San Miguel | W 126–99 | Jordan Murphy (33) | Jordan Murphy (10) | Scottie Thompson (11) | Ninoy Aquino Stadium | 2–0 |
| 3 | November 3, 2026 | San Miguel | L 98–101 | RJ Abarrientos (21) | Jordan Murphy (17) | Scottie Thompson (8) | Dasmariñas Arena | 2–1 |
| 4 | November 6, 2026 | San Miguel | L 102–108 | Scottie Thompson (27) | Jordan Murphy (22) | Ralph Cu (5) | Smart Araneta Coliseum | 2–2 |
| 5 | November 10, 2026 | San Miguel | W 110–94 | Jordan Murphy (31) | Jordan Murphy (11) | RJ Abarrientos (5) | Ynares Center Antipolo | 3–2 |

Semifinals: 0–0

| Game | Date | Opponent | Score | High points | High rebounds | High assists | Location Attendance | Series |
|---|---|---|---|---|---|---|---|---|
| 1 | December 4, 2026 | TNT | | | | | Ninoy Aquino Stadium | |
| 2 | December 6, 2026 | TNT | | | | | SM Mall of Asia Arena | |
| 3 | December 9, 2026 | TNT | | | | | Ynares Center Antipolo | |

== Transactions ==
=== Free agency ===
==== Signings ====
| Player | Date signed | Contract amount | Contract length | Former team | Ref. |
|---|---|---|---|---|---|
| Isaac Go | August 2, 2025 | Not disclosed | 1 year | Re-signed | |
| Norbert Torres | September 6, 2025 | Not disclosed | Not disclosed | Meralco Bolts | |
| Jayson David | September 29, 2025 | Not disclosed | 2 years | Re-signed | |
| Stephen Holt | October 4, 2025 | Not disclosed | 3 years | Re-signed | |

==== Subtractions ====
| Player | Number | Position | Reason | New team | Ref. |
|---|---|---|---|---|---|
| Jared Dillinger | 2 | Small forward | Retiring | | |
| LA Tenorio | 5 | Point guard | Retiring / Tapped as head coach | Magnolia Chicken Timplados Hotshots (head coach) | |
| Jamie Malonzo | 3 | Small forward / Power forward | Going overseas | Kyoto Hannaryz (B.League) | |
| Paul Garcia | 6 | Shooting guard | Released | Terrafirma Dyip | |
| Von Pessumal | 19 | Shooting guard / Small forward | Contract not renewed | NorthPort Batang Pier / Titan Ultra Giant Risers | |

=== Trades ===
==== Philippine Cup ====
October 2025
| October 15, 2025 | To Barangay Ginebra 2027 (S51) Terrafirma first-round pick | To Terrafirma Maverick Ahanmisi; Aljon Mariano |

==== Mid-season ====
February 2026
| February 27, 2026 | To Barangay Ginebra Kemark Cariño | To Terrafirma Ben Adamos |

=== Recruited imports ===
| Tournament | Name | Debuted | Last game | Record | Ref. |
|---|---|---|---|---|---|
| Commissioner's Cup | Justin Brownlee | March 20, 2026 (vs. Macau) | June 17, 2026 (vs. TNT) | 18–8 | |
| Governors' Cup | Riley Grigsby | July 19, 2026 (vs. Phoenix Super LPG) | August 14, 2026 (vs. Meralco) | 2–4 | |
| Governors' Cup | Jordan Murphy | October 9, 2026 (vs. Rain or Shine) | | 6–3 | |
