= 2025–26 Meralco Bolts season =

- Head coach: Luigi Trillo
- General manager: Paolo Trillo
- Governors: William Pamintuan; Maria Luisa Alvendia (alternate)
- Owners: Manila Electric Company (an MVP Group subsidiary)

Philippine Cup results
- Record: 6–5 (54.5%)
- Place: 7th
- Playoff finish: Semifinalist (lost to TNT, 1–4)

Commissioner's Cup results
- Record: 8–4 (66.7%)
- Place: 4th
- Playoff finish: Semifinalist (lost to TNT, 2–4)

Governors' Cup results
- Record: 4–6 (40%)
- Place: 5th in group B
- Playoff finish: Did not qualify

Meralco Bolts seasons

The 2025–26 Meralco Bolts season was the 15th season of the franchise in the Philippine Basketball Association (PBA).

== Key dates ==
- September 7, 2025: The PBA season 50 draft was held at the SM Mall of Asia Music Hall in Pasay.
- September 26, 2025: The Meralco Bolts unveiled a new logo, which is a simplified version of their previous mark. The team's new dark uniforms were unveiled the same day, featuring a new black base with blue accents across the jersey. A white version will be worn as the light uniform. Additionally, the 1971 Meralco Reddy Kilowatts jerseys, which were worn last season during the 50th anniversary games, will be added to the regular jersey rotation.

== Draft picks ==
Round	Pick	Player	Position	Place of birth	College
1	7	Jason Brickman	PG	United States	LIU Brooklyn
2	19	Vince Magbuhos	PF/C	Italy	Adamson
3	31	Ethan Galang	SG/SF	United States	UE
4	42	Ladis Lepalam	C	Philippines	Benilde
5	52	Jeff Comia	SG	Philippines	New Era

== Roster ==
Meralco Bolts roster
Players
Coaches

Pos.	#	POB	Name	Height	Weight	DOB (YYYY–MM–DD)	From
G	1	(Philippines)	Aaron Black	6 ft 1 in (1.85 m)	180 lb (82 kg)	1996–12–03	Ateneo
G	5	(United States)	Jason Brickman (R)	5 ft 10 in (1.78 m)	165 lb (75 kg)	1991–11–19	LIU Brooklyn
G	6	(United States)	Chris Banchero	6 ft 1 in (1.85 m)	175 lb (79 kg)	1989–01–24	Seattle Pacific
F	7	(United States)	Cliff Hodge	6 ft 4 in (1.93 m)	195 lb (88 kg)	1988–02–03	Hawaii Pacific
F/C	9	(United States)	Antonio Hester (GI / IN)	6 ft 6 in (1.98 m)	198 lb (90 kg)	1990–05–22	Mobile
F	10	(Philippines)	Javee Mocon	6 ft 4 in (1.93 m)	189 lb (86 kg)	1995–04–07	San Beda
G/F	11	(United States)	Chris Newsome	6 ft 2 in (1.88 m)	190 lb (86 kg)	1990–07–25	Ateneo
G	17	(Philippines)	Anjo Caram	5 ft 7 in (1.70 m)	159 lb (72 kg)	1991–01–14	San Beda
F	19	(Philippines)	Bong Quinto	6 ft 2 in (1.88 m)		1994–12–15	Letran
C	20	(Philippines)	Raymond Almazan	6 ft 8 in (2.03 m)	194 lb (88 kg)		Letran
F	22	(Philippines)	Allein Maliksi	6 ft 4 in (1.93 m)	180 lb (82 kg)	1987–09–18	UST
F	23	(United States)	Jordon Varnado (GI)	6 ft 7 in (2.01 m)	235 lb (107 kg)	1997–05–12	Troy
F	24	(Philippines)	Raymar Jose (IN)	6 ft 4 in (1.93 m)	210 lb (95 kg)	1992–08–06	Far Eastern
F	27	(Philippines)	Jansen Rios	6 ft 3 in (1.91 m)	185 lb (84 kg)	1991–10–28	Adamson
G	29	(Philippines)	Jeff Comia (R / IN)	5 ft 11 in (1.80 m)		1997–08–29	New Era
F/C	32	(United States)	Kyle Pascual	6 ft 6 in (1.98 m)	210 lb (95 kg)	1990–04–13	San Beda
C	33	(Australia)	Brandon Bates	6 ft 9 in (2.06 m)	231 lb (105 kg)	1996–08–12	De La Salle
G	71	(Philippines)	CJ Cansino	6 ft 2 in (1.88 m)		1999–10–27	Philippines
F/C	93	(Italy)	Vince Magbuhos (R)	6 ft 5 in (1.96 m)		1999–10–07	Adamson

Head coach

- (Philippines) Luigi Trillo

Assistant coach(es)

- (Philippines) Gene Afable (1st assistant)
- (Philippines) Reynel Hugnatan
- (Philippines) Sandro Soriano
- (Serbia) Nenad Vučinić (active consultant)
- (United States) Norman Black (consultant)

Team manager

- (Philippines) Paolo Trillo

Legend

- (C) Team captain
- (CI) Commissioner's Cup Import
- (GI) Governors' Cup Import
- (EI) EASL Import
- (DP) Unsigned draft pick
- (FA) Free agent
- (IN) Inactive
- (S) Suspended
- (R) Rookie
- Injured

Roster

== Philippine Cup ==
=== Eliminations ===
==== Standings ====
Pos	Team	W	L	PCT	GB	Qualification
1	San Miguel Beermen	9	2	.818	—	Twice-to-beat in the quarterfinals
2	Rain or Shine Elasto Painters	8	3	.727 (Note: Head-to-head record: Rain or Shine 1–0 TNT)	1	Twice-to-beat in the quarterfinals
3	TNT Tropang 5G	8	3	.727	1	Twice-to-beat in the quarterfinals
4	Converge FiberXers	7	4	.636 (Note: Head-to-head record: Converge 1–0 Barangay Ginebra)	2	Twice-to-beat in the quarterfinals
5	Barangay Ginebra San Miguel	7	4	.636	2	Twice-to-win in the quarterfinals
6	Magnolia Chicken Timplados Hotshots	6	5	.545 (Note: Head-to-head quotient: Magnolia 1.09, Meralco 0.99, NLEX 0.93)	3	Twice-to-win in the quarterfinals
7	Meralco Bolts	6	5	.545	3	Twice-to-win in the quarterfinals
8	NLEX Road Warriors	6	5	.545	3	Twice-to-win in the quarterfinals
9	Titan Ultra Giant Risers	4	7	.364	5	
10	Phoenix Fuel Masters	3	8	.273	6	
11	Blackwater Bossing	1	10	.091 (Note: Head-to-head record: Blackwater 1–0 Terrafirma)	8	
12	Terrafirma Dyip	1	10	.091	8	

Source: PBA.ph
Rules for classification: 1) winning percentage; 2) head-to-head goal average (quotient); 3) head-to-head record; 4) overall quotient; 5) coin toss

==== Game log ====
2025–26 PBA Philippine Cup game log
Total: 6–5
October: 3–4

Game	Date	Opponent	Score	High points	High rebounds	High assists	Location Attendance	Record
1	October 8, 2025	Titan Ultra	L 96–100	CJ Cansino (22)	Brandon Bates (14)	Aaron Black (6)	Ynares Center Antipolo	0–1
2	October 11, 2025	Rain or Shine	L 95–96 (OT)	Cansino, Quinto (18)	Cliff Hodge (16)	Chris Banchero (7)	Ynares Center Montalban	0–2
3	October 15, 2025	Blackwater	W 105–96	Chris Newsome (22)	Almazan, Hodge (8)	Bong Quinto (7)	Smart Araneta Coliseum	1–2
4	October 17, 2025	Barangay Ginebra	W 89–75	Chris Newsome (19)	Brandon Bates (14)	Chris Newsome (4)	Smart Araneta Coliseum	2–2
5	October 19, 2025	Magnolia	W 78–76	CJ Cansino (23)	Brandon Bates (15)	Bong Quinto (3)	Ynares Center Montalban	3–2
6	October 26, 2025	NLEX	L 85–89	CJ Cansino (24)	Cliff Hodge (17)	Bong Quinto (8)	Ynares Center Antipolo	3–3
7	October 29, 2025	TNT	L 98–100 (OT)	Chris Newsome (24)	Cliff Hodge (10)	Chris Newsome (6)	Ynares Center Antipolo	3–4

December: 3–1

Game	Date	Opponent	Score	High points	High rebounds	High assists	Location Attendance	Record
8	December 10, 2025	Terrafirma	W 120–87	CJ Cansino (20)	Brandon Bates (16)	Black, Quinto, Reyson (5)	Ynares Center Antipolo	4–4
9	December 12, 2025	Phoenix	W 88–78	CJ Cansino (22)	Bong Quinto (8)	Chris Banchero (5)	Ninoy Aquino Stadium	5–4
10	December 14, 2025	Converge	W 105–84	CJ Cansino (29)	Aaron Black (8)	Chris Banchero (6)	Ynares Center Antipolo	6–4
11	December 19, 2025	San Miguel	L 104–113	CJ Cansino (21)	Bates, Quinto (9)	Bong Quinto (6)	Ninoy Aquino Stadium	6–5

=== Playoffs ===
==== Bracket ====
Quarterfinals (Top 4 twice-to-beat)
1	San Miguel	101
8	NLEX	94
4	Converge	85	98
5	Barangay Ginebra	105	99*
2	Rain or Shine	79	89
7	Meralco	96	98
3	TNT	118
6	Magnolia	109

Semifinals (Best-of-7)
1	San Miguel	4
5	Barangay Ginebra	2
7	Meralco	1
3	TNT	4

Finals (Best-of-7)
1	San Miguel	4
3	TNT	2

*Game went into overtime

==== Game log ====
2025–26 PBA Philippine Cup playoffs game log
Total: 3–4
Quarterfinals: 2–0

Game	Date	Opponent	Score	High points	High rebounds	High assists	Location Attendance	Series
1	December 27, 2025	Rain or Shine	W 96–79	Cansino, Hodge, Newsome (14)	CJ Cansino (8)	Chris Banchero (6)	Smart Araneta Coliseum	1–0
2	December 28, 2025	Rain or Shine	W 98–89	Chris Newsome (31)	Cliff Hodge (10)	Chris Newsome (5)	Smart Araneta Coliseum	2–0

Semifinals: 1–4

Game	Date	Opponent	Score	High points	High rebounds	High assists	Location Attendance	Series
1	January 4, 2026	TNT	L 95–100	Chris Banchero (16)	Aaron Black (6)	Bong Quinto (7)	Smart Araneta Coliseum	0–1
2	January 7, 2026	TNT	L 92–109	Hodge, Newsome (18)	Almazan, Hodge (7)	Chris Newsome (4)	Smart Araneta Coliseum	0–2
3	January 9, 2026	TNT	W 97–89	Banchero, Cansino (18)	Almazan, Quinto (8)	Chris Newsome (5)	Smart Araneta Coliseum	1–2
4	January 11, 2026	TNT	L 83–102	Chris Banchero (19)	Cliff Hodge (8)	Bong Quinto (4)	SM Mall of Asia Arena	1–3
5	January 14, 2026	TNT	L 96–99	CJ Cansino (36)	Cliff Hodge (14)	Aaron Black (8)	Smart Araneta Coliseum	1–4

== Commissioner's Cup ==
=== Eliminations ===
==== Standings ====
Pos	Team	W	L	PCT	GB	Qualification
1	NLEX Road Warriors	10	2	.833	—	Twice-to-beat in the quarterfinals
2	Barangay Ginebra San Miguel	9	3	.750 (Note: Head-to-head record: Barangay Ginebra 1–0 Rain or Shine)	1	Twice-to-beat in the quarterfinals
3	Rain or Shine Elasto Painters	9	3	.750	1	Twice-to-beat in the quarterfinals
4	Meralco Bolts	8	4	.667	2	Twice-to-beat in the quarterfinals
5	Magnolia Chicken Timplados Hotshots	7	5	.583 (Note: Head-to-head record: Magnolia 1–0 San Miguel)	3	Twice-to-win in the quarterfinals
6	San Miguel Beermen	7	5	.583	3	Twice-to-win in the quarterfinals
7	Phoenix Super LPG Fuel Masters	6	6	.500 (Note: Head-to-head record: Phoenix Super LPG 1–0 TNT)	4	Twice-to-win in the quarterfinals
8	TNT Tropang 5G	6	6	.500	4	Twice-to-win in the quarterfinals
9	Converge FiberXers	5	7	.417	5	
10	Terrafirma Dyip	4	8	.333	6	
11	Macau Black Knights	3	9	.250	7	
12	Titan Ultra Giant Risers	2	10	.167 (Note: Head-to-head record: Titan Ultra 1–0 Blackwater)	8	
13	Blackwater Bossing	2	10	.167	8	

Source: PBA.ph
Rules for classification: 1) winning percentage; 2) head-to-head goal average (quotient); 3) head-to-head record; 4) overall quotient; 5) coin toss

==== Game log ====
2026 PBA Commissioner's Cup game log
Total: 8–4
March: 3–1

Game	Date	Opponent	Score	High points	High rebounds	High assists	Location Attendance	Record
1	March 18, 2026	Converge	W 109–88	Marvin Jones (29)	Cansino, Jones (8)	Aaron Black (6)	Ynares Center Antipolo	1–0
2	March 21, 2026	Phoenix Super LPG	W 93–86	Chris Banchero (17)	Marvin Jones (15)	Jason Brickman (5)	Ynares Center Antipolo	2–0
3	March 27, 2026	Rain or Shine	L 102–109	Chris Newsome (29)	Marvin Jones (16)	Jason Brickman (4)	Smart Araneta Coliseum	2–1
4	March 29, 2026	Titan Ultra	W 118–105	CJ Cansino (26)	Marvin Jones (14)	CJ Cansino (5)	Smart Araneta Coliseum	3–1

April: 2–2

Game	Date	Opponent	Score	High points	High rebounds	High assists	Location Attendance	Record
5	April 7, 2026	TNT	W 110–106	Marvin Jones (29)	Marvin Jones (12)	Jason Brickman (8)	Ninoy Aquino Stadium	4–1
6	April 11, 2026	Macau	W 115–110	Marvin Jones (32)	Marvin Jones (14)	Jason Brickman (6)	Ninoy Aquino Stadium	5–1
7	April 17, 2026	NLEX	L 101–104 (OT)	Marvin Jones (25)	Marvin Jones (13)	Chris Newsome (6)	Ynares Center Montalban	5–2
8	April 28, 2026	San Miguel	L 92–103	Marvin Jones (26)	Marvin Jones (13)	Jason Brickman (5)	Ninoy Aquino Stadium	5–3

May: 3–1

Game	Date	Opponent	Score	High points	High rebounds	High assists	Location Attendance	Record
9	May 1, 2026	Barangay Ginebra	W 112–91	Cansino, Jones (18)	Marvin Jones (9)	Jason Brickman (6)	Smart Araneta Coliseum; 12,711	6–3
10	May 3, 2026	Blackwater	W 108–93	Marvin Jones (26)	Marvin Jones (12)	Chris Banchero (8)	Smart Araneta Coliseum	7–3
11	May 8, 2026	Terrafirma	W 113–69	Jones, Newsome (14)	Brandon Bates (12)	Jason Brickman (7)	Ninoy Aquino Stadium	8–3
12	May 10, 2026	Magnolia	L 76–93	Jones, Mocon (14)	Cansino, Jones (6)	Jason Brickman (3)	SM Mall of Asia Arena; 13,967	8–4

=== Playoffs ===
==== Bracket ====
Quarterfinals (Top 4 twice-to-beat)
1	NLEX	93	112
8	TNT	96	118
4	Meralco	89	105
5	Magnolia	95	102*
2	Barangay Ginebra	112
7	Phoenix Super LPG	81
3	Rain or Shine	113
6	San Miguel	104

Semifinals (Best-of-7)
8	TNT	4
4	Meralco	2
2	Barangay Ginebra	4
3	Rain or Shine	2

Finals (Best-of-7)
8	TNT	3
2	Barangay Ginebra	4

*Game went into overtime

==== Game log ====
2026 PBA Commissioner's Cup playoffs game log
Total: 3–5
Quarterfinals: 1–1

Game	Date	Opponent	Score	High points	High rebounds	High assists	Location Attendance	Series
1	May 13, 2026	Magnolia	L 89–95	Chris Newsome (23)	Marvin Jones (6)	Chris Newsome (3)	Ninoy Aquino Stadium	0–1
2	May 16, 2026	Magnolia	W 105–102 (OT)	Marvin Jones (28)	Marvin Jones (9)	Chris Newsome (5)	Ynares Center Antipolo	1–1

Semifinals: 2–4

Game	Date	Opponent	Score	High points	High rebounds	High assists	Location Attendance	Series
1	May 20, 2026	TNT	L 89–94	Marvin Jones (22)	Marvin Jones (14)	Jason Brickman (6)	Ynares Center Antipolo; 10,412	0–1
2	May 22, 2026	TNT	W 87–76	Chris Newsome (24)	Marvin Jones (13)	Jason Brickman (4)	SM Mall of Asia Arena; 11,522	1–1
3	May 24, 2026	TNT	L 75–77	Marvin Jones (22)	Marvin Jones (15)	Jason Brickman (7)	SM Mall of Asia Arena; 13,524	1–2
4	May 27, 2026	TNT	W 87–76	Patrick Gardner (20)	Patrick Gardner (13)	Jason Brickman (6)	Smart Araneta Coliseum; 14,615	2–2
5	May 29, 2026	TNT	L 95–103	Patrick Gardner (25)	Patrick Gardner (12)	Chris Banchero (6)	Smart Araneta Coliseum; 11,779	2–3
6	May 31, 2026	TNT	L 94–97	Patrick Gardner (32)	Patrick Gardner (13)	Jason Brickman (8)	Ynares Center Antipolo; 11,321	2–4

== Governors' Cup ==
=== Eliminations ===
==== Standings ====
Pos	Team	W	L	PCT	GB	Qualification
1	q – Magnolia Chicken Timplados Hotshots	7	3	.700	—	Quarterfinals
2	q – Rain or Shine Elasto Painters	6	4	.600	1	Quarterfinals
3	q – Barangay Ginebra San Miguel	5	5	.500 (Note: Head-to-head quotient: Barangay Ginebra 1.08, Phoenix Super LPG 0.92)	2	Quarterfinals
4	q – Phoenix Super LPG Fuel Masters	5	5	.500	2	Quarterfinals
5	e – Meralco Bolts	4	6	.400	3	
6	e – Blackwater Bossing	3	7	.300	4	

Source: PBA.ph
Rules for classification: 1) winning percentage; 2) if two teams are tied, head-to-head record, if three or more teams are tied, head-to-head goal average (quotient); 3) overall quotient; 4) coin toss
e – Eliminated; q – Qualified for the phase indicated

==== Game log ====
2026 PBA Governors' Cup game log
Total: 4–6
July: 2–3

Game	Date	Opponent	Score	High points	High rebounds	High assists	Location Attendance	Record
1	July 15, 2026	Phoenix Super LPG	L 97–98	CJ Cansino (18)	Brandon Bates (15)	Jason Brickman (6)	Smart Araneta Coliseum	0–1
2	July 18, 2026	Rain or Shine	W 122–114	Antonio Hester (21)	Antonio Hester (9)	Jason Brickman (7)	Ynares Center Antipolo	1–1
3	July 21, 2026	Blackwater	W 116–114	Antonio Hester (25)	Antonio Hester (12)	Jason Brickman (8)	Ynares Center Antipolo	2–1
4	July 24, 2026	Magnolia	L 98–112	Antonio Hester (28)	Antonio Hester (10)	Jason Brickman (5)	Smart Araneta Coliseum	2–2
5	July 31, 2026	Barangay Ginebra	L 75–84	Antonio Hester (24)	Antonio Hester (18)	Chris Banchero (5)	SM Mall of Asia Arena	2–3

August: 1–2

Game	Date	Opponent	Score	High points	High rebounds	High assists	Location Attendance	Record
6	August 2, 2026	Rain or Shine	L 83–85	Chris Newsome (16)	Antonio Hester (13)	Aaron Black (6)	Smart Araneta Coliseum	2–4
7	August 7, 2026	Magnolia	L 88–105	Antonio Hester (24)	Brandon Bates (9)	Jason Brickman (4)	Ninoy Aquino Stadium	2–5
8	August 14, 2026	Barangay Ginebra	W 97–88	Jordon Varnado (31)	Chris Newsome (8)	Jason Brickman (6)	Smart Araneta Coliseum	3–5

October: 1–1

Game	Date	Opponent	Score	High points	High rebounds	High assists	Location Attendance	Record
9	October 13, 2026	Blackwater	W 120–115	Jordon Varnado (31)	Bong Quinto (9)	Jordon Varnado (7)	Ninoy Aquino Stadium	4–5
10	October 16, 2026	Phoenix Super LPG	L 101–105	Jordon Varnado (36)	Javee Mocon (8)	Jason Brickman (5)	Ynares Center Antipolo	4–6

== East Asia Super League ==
=== Group stage ===
==== Standings ====
Pos	Team	Pld	W	L	PF	PA	PD	PCT	Qualification
1	(Japan) Ryukyu Golden Kings	6	5	1	526	487	+39	.833	Advance to finals
2	(Chinese Taipei) Taoyuan Pauian Pilots	6	4	2	533	494	+39	.667	Advance to finals
3	(Philippines) Meralco Bolts	6	3	3	493	492	+1	.500	
4	Macau Black Bears	6	0	6	494	573	−79	.000	

Source: EASL

==== Game log ====
22 October 2025	Ryukyu Golden Kings (Japan)	81–72	(Philippines) Meralco Bolts	Okinawa
19:05 (JST)	Scoring by quarter: 14–18, 23–18, 22–20, 22–16
	Pts: Kishimoto 22; Rebs: Cooley 19; Asts: Kishimoto 8	Boxscore	Pts: Hollis-Jefferson 25; Rebs: Romero 11; Asts: Hollis-Jefferson, Newsome 5	Arena: Okinawa Suntory Arena

2 November 2025	Taoyuan Pauian Pilots (Chinese Taipei)	82–72	(Philippines) Meralco Bolts	Taoyuan City
17:10 (TST)	Scoring by quarter: 21–16, 22–14, 21–17, 18–25
	Pts: Artino 20; Rebs: Artino 17; Asts: three players 3	Boxscore	Pts: Romero 26; Rebs: Romero 17; Asts: Hollis-Jefferson 4	Arena: Taoyuan Arena

8 November 2025	Meralco Bolts (Philippines)	85–76	(Chinese Taipei) Taoyuan Pauian Pilots	Ilagan
18:10 (PST)	Scoring by quarter: 23–14, 20–16, 23–20, 19–26
	Pts: Vahedi, Romero 22; Rebs: Romero 14; Asts: Vahedi, Hollis-Jefferson 7	Boxscore	Pts: Millner 19; Rebs: Artino 11; Asts: Brown 4	Arena: The Capital Arena

15 November 2025	Meralco Bolts (Philippines)	92–74	Macau Black Bears	Cebu City
18:10 (PST)	Scoring by quarter: 25–24, 23–14, 17–14, 27–22
	Pts: Hollis-Jefferson 34; Rebs: Romero 28; Asts: Hollis-Jefferson 5	Boxscore	Pts: Chong Qui 25; Rebs: Miller 10; Asts: Chong Qui 4	Arena: Cebu Coliseum

6 December 2025	Macau Black Bears	91–93	(Philippines) Meralco Bolts	Ilagan
18:10 (PST)	Scoring by quarter: 27–29, 17–22, 19–20, 28–22
	Pts: Peek-Green 26; Rebs: Deguara 13; Asts: Chong Qui 9	Boxscore	Pts: Romero 24; Rebs: Romero 17; Asts: Newsome 10	Arena: The Capital Arena

11 February 2026	Meralco Bolts (Philippines)	79–88	(Japan) Ryukyu Golden Kings	Quezon City
19:40 (PST)	Scoring by quarter: 16–26, 20–25, 22–23, 21–14
	Pts: Romero 24; Rebs: Romero 9 Asts: Brownlee 6	Boxscore	Pts: Matsuwaki 18; Rebs: Cooley 11; Asts: Law, Kishimoto 4	Arena: Smart Araneta Coliseum

== Transactions ==
=== Free agency ===
==== Signings ====
Player	Date signed	Contract amount	Contract length	Former team	Ref.
Raymond Almazan	August 13, 2025	Not disclosed	2 years	Re-signed	
Chris Newsome	September 5, 2025	Not disclosed	3 years	Re-signed	

==== Subtractions ====
Player	Number	Position	Reason	New team	Ref.
Jolo Mendoza	10	Shooting guard	Released	Abra Solid North Weavers (MPBL)	
Alvin Pasaol	23	Small forward	Released	Parañaque Patriots	
Norbert Torres	29	Center / Power forward	Free agent	Barangay Ginebra San Miguel	
Ladis Lepalam	27	Center	Released	Converge FiberXers	

=== Trades ===
==== Mid-season ====
February 2026
February 24, 2026	To Meralco Javee Mocon	To Converge Jonnel Policarpio (from NLEX); Kurt Reyson (from Meralco); 2028 (S52) Meralco second-round pick	To NLEX Schonny Winston (from Converge); Kevin Racal (from Converge)

=== Recruited imports ===
Tournament	Name	Debuted	Last game	Record	Ref.
Commissioner's Cup	Marvin Jones	March 18, 2026 (vs. Converge)	May 24, 2026 (vs. TNT)	10–7	
Commissioner's Cup	Patrick Gardner	May 27, 2026 (vs. TNT)	May 31, 2026 (vs. TNT)	1–2	
Governors' Cup	Antonio Hester	July 18, 2026 (vs. Rain or Shine)	August 7, 2026 (vs. Magnolia)	2–4	
Governors' Cup	Jordon Varnado	August 14, 2026 (vs. Barangay Ginebra)	October 16, 2026 (vs. Phoenix Super LPG)	2–1	
