= Dalph Panopio =

Filipino-Italian basketball player

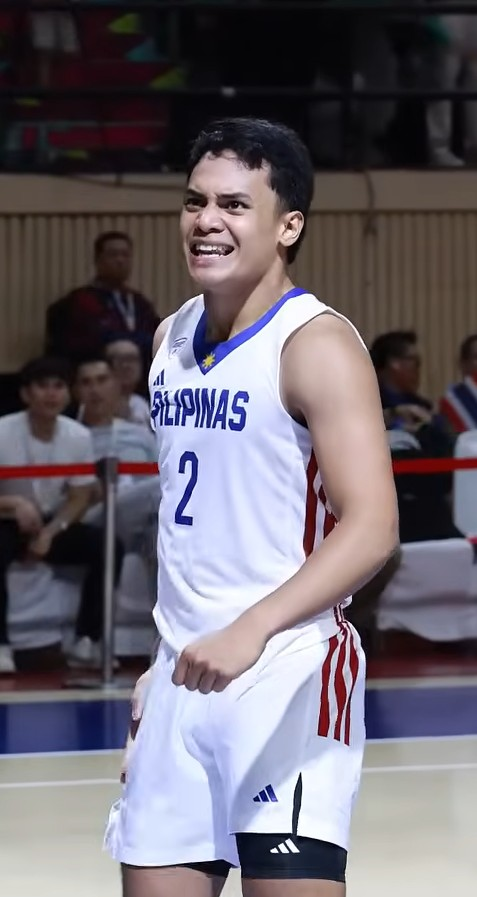
- Panopio with Gilas Pilipinas in 2025

No. 9 – Blackwater Bossing
- Position: Point guard
- League: PBA

Personal information
- Born: June 10, 2000 (age 26) Rome, Italy
- Listed height: 6 ft 1 in (1.85 m)
- Listed weight: 180 lb (82 kg)

Career information
- College: Cal State Baskersfield
- PBA draft: 2025: 1st round, 3rd overall pick
- Drafted by: Blackwater Bossing
- Playing career: 2025–present

Career history
- 2025: Mumbai Titans
- 2025–present: Blackwater Bossing

Dalph Adem Panopio (born June 10, 2000) is a Filipino-Italian professional basketball player for the Blackwater Bossing of the Philippine Basketball Association. He was born in Rome, Italy.

In college, Panopio played for the South Plains College Texans and Cal State Bakersfield Roadrunners. In September 2025, he was selected third overall by the Blackwater Bossing in the PBA season 50 draft.

Internationally, he represents the Philippines, previously playing for the country's national under-19 team.

== Amateur and college career ==
Prior to college, Panopio played for Italy's Stella Azzurra Roma. He was part of the team that made the finals of the 2017–18 Euroleague Basketball Next Generation Tournament. For his freshman year, he played for South Plains College before committing with California State University, Bakersfield, joining the Roadrunners for the remainder of his time in the collegiate ranks.

== Professional career ==
=== Pre-PBA stint ===
On June 17, 2024, Panopio signed with the Suwon KT Sonicboom of the Korean Basketball League, replacing Dave Ildefonso as the team's Asian import. However, he suffered a herniated disc injury, which led to him being released by the team on September 24. He instead suited up for the Mumbai Titans in the Indian National Basketball League.

=== Blackwater Bossing (2025–present) ===
On August 26, 2025, Panopio declared for the PBA season 50 draft. He was selected by the Blackwater Bossing with the third overall pick. Five days after the draft, on September 12, he signed a three-year contract with the team.

== PBA career statistics ==
Legend
GP	Games played	MPG	Minutes per game	FG%	Field-goal percentage
3FG%	3-point field-goal percentage	4P%	4-point field-goal percentage	FT%	Free-throw percentage
RPG	Rebounds per game	APG	Assists per game	SPG	Steals per game
BPG	Blocks per game	PPG	Points per game	127	Career high

As of the end of 2025–26 season

=== Season-by-season averages ===
Year	Team	GP	MPG	FG%	3P%	4P%	FT%	RPG	APG	SPG	BPG	PPG
2025–26	Blackwater	24	22.0	.399	.319	.200	.736	4.0	2.7	1.5	.3	10.4

== National team career ==
Panopio represents the Philippines at the international level. He suited up for the country's national under-19 team during the 2018 FIBA U18 Asian Championship and 2019 FIBA Under-19 Basketball World Cup. He got his first senior call-up during the 2025 SEA Games, where he won the gold medal in the men's basketball tournament.
