= 2025–26 TNT Tropang 5G season =

- Head coach: Chot Reyes
- General manager: Jojo Lastimosa; Yvette Ruiz (assistant)
- Owners: Smart Communications (an MVP Group subsidiary)

Philippine Cup results
- Record: 8–3 (72.7%)
- Place: 3rd
- Playoff finish: Runner-up (lost to San Miguel, 2–4)

Commissioner's Cup results
- Record: 6–6 (50%)
- Place: 8th
- Playoff finish: Runner-up (lost to Barangay Ginebra, 3–4)

Governors' Cup results
- Record: 7–5 (58.3%)
- Place: 4th in group A
- Playoff finish: TBD

TNT Tropang 5G seasons

The 2025–26 TNT Tropang 5G season is the 35th season of the franchise in the Philippine Basketball Association (PBA).

== Key dates ==
- September 7, 2025: The PBA season 50 draft was held at the SM Mall of Asia Music Hall in Pasay.

== Draft picks ==
Round	Pick	Player	Position	Place of birth	College
3	35	Sean Quitevis	SG	Philippines	Ateneo
4	46	Joe Celzo	PF	Philippines	San Beda

== Roster ==
TNT Tropang 5G roster
Players
Coaches

Pos.	#	POB	Name	Height	Weight	DOB (YYYY–MM–DD)	From
G	0	(United States)	Simon Enciso	5 ft 11 in (1.80 m)	185 lb (84 kg)	1991–02–12	Notre Dame de Namur
F	2	(United States)	Tyrus Hill	6 ft 5 in (1.96 m)	185 lb (84 kg)	1996–03–20	De La Salle
F	5	(Philippines)	Joe Celzo (R)	6 ft 4 in (1.93 m)		2000–04–25	San Beda
G	6	(Philippines)	Rey Nambatac	5 ft 11 in (1.80 m)		1994–01–27	Letran
C	7	(Philippines)	Poy Erram	6 ft 8 in (2.03 m)	227 lb (103 kg)	1989–07–07	Ateneo
F	8	(Philippines)	Calvin Oftana	6 ft 5 in (1.96 m)	196 lb (89 kg)	1996–01–03	San Beda
F	9	(United States)	Paul Varilla	6 ft 3 in (1.91 m)		1993–08–10	UE
F	12	(Philippines)	Glenn Khobuntin	6 ft 4 in (1.93 m)	195 lb (88 kg)	1991–09–07	National-U
F	14	(Philippines)	Mike Nieto (FA)	6 ft 2 in (1.88 m)	200 lb (91 kg)	1997–05–31	Ateneo
G	15	(Australia)	Jordan Heading	6 ft 2 in (1.88 m)	189 lb (86 kg)	1996–01–30	Cal Baptist
G/F	16	(Philippines)	Roger Pogoy (C)	6 ft 2 in (1.88 m)	180 lb (82 kg)	1992–06–16	Far Eastern
G	17	(Philippines)	Jayson Castro (FA)	5 ft 10 in (1.78 m)	185 lb (84 kg)	1986–06–30	Philippine Christian
F/C	21	(United States)	Kelly Williams (FA)	6 ft 7 in (2.01 m)	215 lb (98 kg)	1982–02–07	Oakland
F	24	(United States)	Rondae Hollis-Jefferson (GI)	6 ft 6 in (1.98 m)	217 lb (98 kg)	1995–01–03	Arizona
G	27	(Canada)	Avan Nava (FA)	6 ft 2 in (1.88 m)	180 lb (82 kg)	2000–04–04	St. Francis Xavier
G	28	(Philippines)	Jio Jalalon	5 ft 9 in (1.75 m)	150 lb (68 kg)	1992–08–02	Arellano
G	30	(Philippines)	Sean Quitevis (R)	6 ft 1 in (1.85 m)		1999–09–30	Ateneo
F/C	32	(United States)	Henry Galinato	6 ft 6 in (1.98 m)	245 lb (111 kg)	1997–09–09	UP
G/F	35	(Philippines)	Kim Aurin	6 ft 1 in (1.85 m)	190 lb (86 kg)	1997–02–05	UPHSD
F/C	45	(United States)	Brandon Ganuelas-Rosser	6 ft 6 in (1.98 m)	220 lb (100 kg)	1994–06–29	UC Riverside
F/C	60	(Philippines)	Jeo Ambohot	6 ft 7 in (2.01 m)	193 lb (88 kg)	1996–11–18	Letran
F	77	(Philippines)	Kevin Ferrer	6 ft 5 in (1.96 m)	188 lb (85 kg)	1993–03–26	UST

Head coach

- (Philippines) Chot Reyes

Assistant coach(es)

- (Philippines) Josh Reyes (1st assistant)
- (Philippines) Sandy Arespacochaga
- (Philippines) Ranidel de Ocampo
- (Philippines) Yuri Escueta
- (Philippines) Ryan Reyes
- (Philippines) Bong Ravena

Team manager

- (Philippines) Jojo Lastimosa
- (Philippines) Yvette Ruiz (assistant)

Legend

- (C) Team captain
- (CI) Commissioner's Cup Import
- (GI) Governors' Cup Import
- (EI) EASL Import
- (DP) Unsigned draft pick
- (FA) Free agent
- (IN) Inactive
- (S) Suspended
- (R) Rookie
- Injured

Roster

== Abu Dhabi International Basketball Championship ==
The TNT Tropang 5G played at the 2025 Abu Dhabi International Basketball Championship during the preseason. TNT finished with a 1–2 win-loss record failing to advance to the semifinals from a group of 4 teams. They were sanctioned by the PBA for their participation since they did not inform the league properly about it.

September 29, 2025	Al Sharjah (United Arab Emirates)	93–74	(Philippines) TNT Tropang 5G	Abu Dhabi, UAE
				Arena: Al Jazira Club Indoor Arena

September 30, 2025	Al Dhafra (United Arab Emirates)	76–98	(Philippines) TNT Tropang 5G	Abu Dhabi, UAE
				Arena: Al Jazira Club Indoor Arena

October 1, 2025	Al Riyadi (Lebanon)	95–53	(Philippines) TNT Tropang 5G	Abu Dhabi, UAE
				Arena: Al Jazira Club Indoor Arena

== Philippine Cup ==
=== Eliminations ===
==== Standings ====
Pos	Team	W	L	PCT	GB	Qualification
1	San Miguel Beermen	9	2	.818	—	Twice-to-beat in the quarterfinals
2	Rain or Shine Elasto Painters	8	3	.727 (Note: Head-to-head record: Rain or Shine 1–0 TNT)	1	Twice-to-beat in the quarterfinals
3	TNT Tropang 5G	8	3	.727	1	Twice-to-beat in the quarterfinals
4	Converge FiberXers	7	4	.636 (Note: Head-to-head record: Converge 1–0 Barangay Ginebra)	2	Twice-to-beat in the quarterfinals
5	Barangay Ginebra San Miguel	7	4	.636	2	Twice-to-win in the quarterfinals
6	Magnolia Chicken Timplados Hotshots	6	5	.545 (Note: Head-to-head quotient: Magnolia 1.09, Meralco 0.99, NLEX 0.93)	3	Twice-to-win in the quarterfinals
7	Meralco Bolts	6	5	.545	3	Twice-to-win in the quarterfinals
8	NLEX Road Warriors	6	5	.545	3	Twice-to-win in the quarterfinals
9	Titan Ultra Giant Risers	4	7	.364	5	
10	Phoenix Fuel Masters	3	8	.273	6	
11	Blackwater Bossing	1	10	.091 (Note: Head-to-head record: Blackwater 1–0 Terrafirma)	8	
12	Terrafirma Dyip	1	10	.091	8	

Source: PBA.ph
Rules for classification: 1) winning percentage; 2) head-to-head goal average (quotient); 3) head-to-head record; 4) overall quotient; 5) coin toss

==== Game log ====
2025–26 PBA Philippine Cup game log
Total: 8–3
October: 4–1

Game	Date	Opponent	Score	High points	High rebounds	High assists	Location Attendance	Record
1	October 10, 2025	Phoenix	W 93–78	Rey Nambatac (22)	Khobuntin, Oftana (9)	Roger Pogoy (4)	Ynares Center Montalban	1–0
2	October 15, 2025	Barangay Ginebra	L 77–92	Simon Enciso (17)	Kevin Ferrer (8)	Nambatac, Pogoy (3)	Smart Araneta Coliseum	1–1
3	October 18, 2025	Converge	W 110–103	Roger Pogoy (27)	Henry Galinato (7)	Rey Nambatac (6)	Chavit Coliseum	2–1
4	October 24, 2025	Titan Ultra	W 130–92	Henry Galinato (16)	Calvin Oftana (10)	Jio Jalalon (9)	Ynares Center Antipolo	3–1
5	October 29, 2025	Meralco	W 100–98 (OT)	Calvin Oftana (24)	Henry Galinato (8)	Jio Jalalon (3)	Ynares Center Antipolo	4–1

November: 1–1

Game	Date	Opponent	Score	High points	High rebounds	High assists	Location Attendance	Record
6	November 7, 2025	Terrafirma	W 109–95 (OT)	Kelly Williams (28)	Jio Jalalon (12)	Jio Jalalon (8)	Ynares Center Montalban	5–1
7	November 15, 2025	Rain or Shine	L 89–91	Nambatac, Pogoy (18)	Kelly Williams (8)	Kelly Williams (4)	Aquilino Q. Pimentel Jr. International Convention Center	5–2

December: 3–1

Game	Date	Opponent	Score	High points	High rebounds	High assists	Location Attendance	Record
8	December 5, 2025	San Miguel	L 95–110	Jordan Heading (18)	Henry Galinato (7)	Simon Enciso (9)	Ynares Center Antipolo	5–3
9	December 13, 2025	NLEX	W 119–100	Jordan Heading (32)	Brandon Ganuelas-Rosser (12)	Jordan Heading (4)	Ynares Center Antipolo	6–3
10	December 19, 2025	Blackwater	W 113–96	Calvin Oftana (25)	Brandon Ganuelas-Rosser (8)	Jio Jalalon (4)	Ninoy Aquino Stadium	7–3
11	December 21, 2025	Magnolia	W 94–93	Jordan Heading (23)	Calvin Oftana (9)	Roger Pogoy (6)	Smart Araneta Coliseum	8–3

=== Playoffs ===
==== Bracket ====
Quarterfinals (Top 4 twice-to-beat)
1	San Miguel	101
8	NLEX	94
4	Converge	85	98
5	Barangay Ginebra	105	99*
2	Rain or Shine	79	89
7	Meralco	96	98
3	TNT	118
6	Magnolia	109

Semifinals (Best-of-7)
1	San Miguel	4
5	Barangay Ginebra	2
7	Meralco	1
3	TNT	4

Finals (Best-of-7)
1	San Miguel	4
3	TNT	2

*Game went into overtime

==== Game log ====
2025–26 PBA Philippine Cup playoffs game log
Total: 7–5
Quarterfinals: 1–0

Game	Date	Opponent	Score	High points	High rebounds	High assists	Location Attendance	Series
1	December 27, 2025	Magnolia	W 118–109	Calvin Oftana (25)	Brandon Ganuelas-Rosser (9)	Nambatac, Oftana (5)	Smart Araneta Coliseum	1–0

Semifinals: 4–1

Game	Date	Opponent	Score	High points	High rebounds	High assists	Location Attendance	Series
1	January 4, 2026	Meralco	W 100–95	Calvin Oftana (28)	Brandon Ganuelas-Rosser (10)	Heading, Nambatac, Oftana, Pogoy, Williams (2)	Smart Araneta Coliseum	1–0
2	January 7, 2026	Meralco	W 109–92	Calvin Oftana (26)	Calvin Oftana (7)	Rey Nambatac (5)	Smart Araneta Coliseum	2–0
3	January 9, 2026	Meralco	L 89–97	Roger Pogoy (28)	Kelly Williams (7)	Nambatac, Pogoy (3)	Smart Araneta Coliseum	2–1
4	January 11, 2026	Meralco	W 102–83	Poy Erram (27)	Poy Erram (9)	Simon Enciso (6)	SM Mall of Asia Arena	3–1
5	January 14, 2026	Meralco	W 99–96	Jordan Heading (31)	Henry Galinato (8)	Jordan Heading (5)	Smart Araneta Coliseum	4–1

Finals: 2–4

Game	Date	Opponent	Score	High points	High rebounds	High assists	Location Attendance	Series
1	January 21, 2026	San Miguel	W 96–91	Kelly Williams (15)	Calvin Oftana (10)	Rey Nambatac (6)	Ynares Center Antipolo	1–0
2	January 23, 2026	San Miguel	L 92–111	Rey Nambatac (17)	Brandon Ganuelas-Rosser (6)	Jio Jalalon (7)	Ynares Center Antipolo	1–1
3	January 25, 2026	San Miguel	L 89–95	Calvin Oftana (25)	Brandon Ganuelas-Rosser (13)	Jordan Heading (11)	SM Mall of Asia Arena	2–1
4	January 28, 2026	San Miguel	W 110–87	Calvin Oftana (29)	Calvin Oftana (6)	Jordan Heading (6)	SM Mall of Asia Arena	2–2
5	January 30, 2026	San Miguel	L 82–96	Calvin Oftana (20)	Calvin Oftana (9)	Brandon Ganuelas-Rosser (4)	Ynares Center Antipolo	2–3
6	February 1, 2026	San Miguel	L 77–92	Calvin Oftana (28)	Calvin Oftana (7)	Heading, Oftana (5)	SM Mall of Asia Arena; 14,201	2–4

== Commissioner's Cup ==
=== Eliminations ===
==== Standings ====
Pos	Team	W	L	PCT	GB	Qualification
1	NLEX Road Warriors	10	2	.833	—	Twice-to-beat in the quarterfinals
2	Barangay Ginebra San Miguel	9	3	.750 (Note: Head-to-head record: Barangay Ginebra 1–0 Rain or Shine)	1	Twice-to-beat in the quarterfinals
3	Rain or Shine Elasto Painters	9	3	.750	1	Twice-to-beat in the quarterfinals
4	Meralco Bolts	8	4	.667	2	Twice-to-beat in the quarterfinals
5	Magnolia Chicken Timplados Hotshots	7	5	.583 (Note: Head-to-head record: Magnolia 1–0 San Miguel)	3	Twice-to-win in the quarterfinals
6	San Miguel Beermen	7	5	.583	3	Twice-to-win in the quarterfinals
7	Phoenix Super LPG Fuel Masters	6	6	.500 (Note: Head-to-head record: Phoenix Super LPG 1–0 TNT)	4	Twice-to-win in the quarterfinals
8	TNT Tropang 5G	6	6	.500	4	Twice-to-win in the quarterfinals
9	Converge FiberXers	5	7	.417	5	
10	Terrafirma Dyip	4	8	.333	6	
11	Macau Black Knights (G)	3	9	.250	7	
12	Titan Ultra Giant Risers	2	10	.167 (Note: Head-to-head record: Titan Ultra 1–0 Blackwater)	8	
13	Blackwater Bossing	2	10	.167	8	

Source: PBA.ph
Rules for classification: 1) winning percentage; 2) head-to-head goal average (quotient); 3) head-to-head record; 4) overall quotient; 5) coin toss
(G) Guests

==== Game log ====
2026 PBA Commissioner's Cup game log
Total: 6–6
March: 2–1

Game	Date	Opponent	Score	High points	High rebounds	High assists	Location Attendance	Record
1	March 20, 2026	Rain or Shine	L 109–112	Bol Bol (38)	Bol Bol (16)	Enciso, Heading (4)	Smart Araneta Coliseum	0–1
2	March 22, 2026	NLEX	W 103–97	Bol Bol (40)	Bol Bol (15)	Jordan Heading (4)	Ynares Center Antipolo	1–1
3	March 28, 2026	San Miguel	W 118–92	Bol Bol (34)	Bol Bol (18)	Jayson Castro (8)	Smart Araneta Coliseum	2–1

April: 4–1

Game	Date	Opponent	Score	High points	High rebounds	High assists	Location Attendance	Record
4	April 7, 2026	Meralco	L 106–110	Bol Bol (28)	Bol Bol (12)	Jayson Castro (5)	Ninoy Aquino Stadium	2–2
5	April 11, 2026	Terrafirma	W 101–89	Bol Bol (35)	Bol Bol (14)	Jordan Heading (6)	Ninoy Aquino Stadium	3–2
6	April 14, 2026	Blackwater	W 99–94	Bol Bol (48)	Bol Bol (11)	Castro, Pogoy (4)	Ynares Center Antipolo	4–2
7	April 18, 2026	Titan Ultra	W 97–92	Bol Bol (50)	Bol Bol (17)	Jayson Castro (5)	Ynares Center Montalban	5–2
8	April 22, 2026	Converge	L 92–97	Bol Bol (32)	Bol Bol (16)	Calvin Oftana (5)	Ninoy Aquino Stadium	5–3
9	April 24, 2026	Macau	W 119–112	Bol Bol (37)	Bol Bol (14)	Jayson Castro (6)	Smart Araneta Coliseum	6–3

May: 0–3

Game	Date	Opponent	Score	High points	High rebounds	High assists	Location Attendance	Record
10	May 1, 2026	Phoenix Super LPG	L 97–100 (OT)	Bol Bol (30)	Bol Bol (20)	Rey Nambatac (4)	Smart Araneta Coliseum; 12,711	6–4
11	May 5, 2026	Magnolia	L 94–106	Bol Bol (53)	Bol Bol (13)	Castro, Pogoy (3)	Ninoy Aquino Stadium	6–5
12	May 10, 2026	Barangay Ginebra	L 86–93	Bol Bol (33)	Bol Bol (10)	Bol, Castro (3)	SM Mall of Asia Arena; 13,967	6–6

=== Playoffs ===
==== Bracket ====
Quarterfinals (Top 4 twice-to-beat)
1	NLEX	93	112
8	TNT	96	118
4	Meralco	89	105
5	Magnolia	95	102*
2	Barangay Ginebra	112
7	Phoenix Super LPG	81
3	Rain or Shine	113
6	San Miguel	104

Semifinals (Best-of-7)
8	TNT	4
4	Meralco	2
2	Barangay Ginebra	4
3	Rain or Shine	2

Finals (Best-of-7)
8	TNT	3
2	Barangay Ginebra	4

*Game went into overtime

==== Game log ====
2026 PBA Commissioner's Cup playoffs game log
Total: 9–6
Quarterfinals: 2–0

Game	Date	Opponent	Score	High points	High rebounds	High assists	Location Attendance	Series
1	May 13, 2026	NLEX	W 96–93	Bol Bol (34)	Bol Bol (14)	Jordan Heading (4)	Ninoy Aquino Stadium	1–0
2	May 16, 2026	NLEX	W 118–112	Bol Bol (35)	Bol Bol (13)	Jayson Castro (8)	Ynares Center Antipolo	2–0

Semifinals: 4–2

Game	Date	Opponent	Score	High points	High rebounds	High assists	Location Attendance	Series
1	May 20, 2026	Meralco	W 94–89	Bol Bol (37)	Bol, Oftana (11)	Bol Bol (8)	Ynares Center Antipolo; 10,412	1–0
2	May 22, 2026	Meralco	L 76–87	Roger Pogoy (27)	Calvin Oftana (9)	Rey Nambatac (4)	SM Mall of Asia Arena; 11,522	1–1
3	May 24, 2026	Meralco	W 77–75	Rey Nambatac (18)	Ganuelas-Rosser, Nambatac (8)	Rey Nambatac (3)	SM Mall of Asia Arena; 13,524	2–1
4	May 27, 2026	Meralco	L 90–101	Chris McCullough (24)	Chris McCullough (9)	Castro, Heading (5)	Smart Araneta Coliseum; 14,615	2–2
5	May 29, 2026	Meralco	W 103–95	Chris McCullough (42)	Chris McCullough (11)	Jayson Castro (7)	Smart Araneta Coliseum; 11,779	3–2
6	May 31, 2026	Meralco	W 97–94	Jordan Heading (30)	Chris McCullough (13)	Chris McCullough (7)	Ynares Center Antipolo; 11,321	4–2

Finals: 3–4

Game	Date	Opponent	Score	High points	High rebounds	High assists	Location Attendance	Series
1	June 3, 2026	Barangay Ginebra	L 100–102	Chris McCullough (25)	Chris McCullough (14)	Ganuelas-Rosser, McCullough (4)	Smart Araneta Coliseum; 11,447	0–1
2	June 5, 2026	Barangay Ginebra	W 101–94	Calvin Oftana (31)	Chris McCullough (16)	Jordan Heading (5)	Smart Araneta Coliseum; 11,510	1–1
3	June 7, 2026	Barangay Ginebra	L 102–116	Chris McCullough (44)	Chris McCullough (13)	Jordan Heading (5)	SM Mall of Asia Arena; 18,607	1–2
4	June 10, 2026	Barangay Ginebra	W 106–98	Jordan Heading (29)	Chris McCullough (14)	Jordan Heading (8)	Smart Araneta Coliseum; 16,823	2–2
5	June 12, 2026	Barangay Ginebra	L 95–100 (OT)	Chris McCullough (38)	Chris McCullough (16)	Jayson Castro (6)	Smart Araneta Coliseum; 18,039	2–3
6	June 14, 2026	Barangay Ginebra	W 98–90	Chris McCullough (53)	Chris McCullough (22)	Jordan Heading (9)	Smart Araneta Coliseum; 22,731	3–3
7	June 17, 2026	Barangay Ginebra	L 76–88	Chris McCullough (28)	Chris McCullough (22)	McCullough, Nambatac, Oftana, Pogoy (3)	SM Mall of Asia Arena; 24,617	3–4

== Governors' Cup ==
=== Eliminations ===
==== Standings ====
Pos	Team	W	L	PCT	GB	Qualification
1	NLEX Road Warriors	9	3	.750 (Note: Head-to-head quotient: NLEX 1.05, San Miguel 0.95)	—	Quarterfinals
2	San Miguel Beermen	9	3	.750	—	Quarterfinals
3	Converge FiberXers	8	4	.667	1	Quarterfinals
4	TNT Tropang 5G	7	5	.583	2	Quarterfinals
5	Terrafirma Dyip	5	7	.417	4	
6	Macau Giant Pandas (G)	2	10	.167 (Note: Head-to-head quotient: Macau 1.01, Titan Ultra 0.99)	7	
7	Titan Ultra Giant Risers	2	10	.167	7	

Source: PBA.ph
Rules for classification: 1) winning percentage; 2) head-to-head quotient (goal average); 3) head-to-head record; 4) coin toss
(G) Guests

==== Game log ====
2026 PBA Governors' Cup game log
Total: 7–5
July: 2–2

Game	Date	Opponent	Score	High points	High rebounds	High assists	Location Attendance	Record
1	July 19, 2026	Macau	W 106–103	Days, Nambatac (23)	Khobuntin, Quitevis (7)	Rey Nambatac (6)	Smart Araneta Coliseum	1–0
2	July 22, 2026	Titan Ultra	L 87–103	Darius Days (21)	Jio Jalalon (9)	Roger Pogoy (7)	Ynares Center Antipolo	1–1
3	July 25, 2026	Terrafirma	L 106–111 (OT)	Jordan Heading (29)	Henry Galinato (10)	Heading, Nambatac (4)	Ynares Center Antipolo	1–2
4	July 28, 2026	Converge	W 110–107	Rey Nambatac (30)	Henry Galinato (11)	Jio Jalalon (5)	Ninoy Aquino Stadium	2–2

August: 2–2

Game	Date	Opponent	Score	High points	High rebounds	High assists	Location Attendance	Record
5	August 1, 2026	San Miguel	W 93–89 (OT)	Kim Aurin (22)	Rahlir Hollis-Jefferson (13)	Rahlir Hollis-Jefferson (7)	SM Mall of Asia Arena	3–2
6	August 4, 2026	NLEX	L 83–88	Rahlir Hollis-Jefferson (22)	Rahlir Hollis-Jefferson (10)	Rahlir Hollis-Jefferson (5)	Ninoy Aquino Stadium	3–3
7	August 8, 2026	Titan Ultra	W 114–80	Jordan Heading (23)	Rahlir Hollis-Jefferson (12)	Rey Nambatac (8)	Ynares Center Montalban	4–3
8	August 11, 2026	NLEX	L 111–118 (OT)	Rahlir Hollis-Jefferson (30)	Rahlir Hollis-Jefferson (13)	Jordan Heading (7)	Ynares Center Antipolo	4–4

October: 3–1

Game	Date	Opponent	Score	High points	High rebounds	High assists	Location Attendance	Record
9	October 7, 2026	Terrafirma	W 116–92	Calvin Oftana (31)	Nick Hornsby (10)	Nick Hornsby (6)	Ninoy Aquino Stadium	5–4
10	October 10, 2026	San Miguel	W 116–98	Nick Hornsby (23)	Galinato, Oftana (7)	Heading, Hornsby (4)	Ynares Center Antipolo	6–4
11	October 13, 2026	Macau	W 142–87	Calvin Oftana (28)	Jio Jalalon (13)	Jio Jalalon (11)	Ninoy Aquino Stadium	7–4
12	October 18, 2026	Converge	L 112–114 (OT)	Rondae Hollis-Jefferson (33)	Rondae Hollis-Jefferson (11)	Rondae Hollis-Jefferson (4)	Ynares Center Antipolo	7–5

=== Playoffs ===
==== Bracket ====
Quarterfinals (Best-of-5)
A1	NLEX	3
B4	Phoenix Super LPG	0
B2	Rain or Shine	1
A3	Converge	3
B1	Magnolia	0
A4	TNT	3
A2	San Miguel	2
B3	Barangay Ginebra	3

Semifinals (Best-of-5)
A1	NLEX	0
A3	Converge	0
A4	TNT	0
B3	Barangay Ginebra	0

Finals (Best-of-7)
A

==== Game log ====
2026 PBA Governors' Cup playoffs game log
Total: 3–0
Quarterfinals: 3–0

Game	Date	Opponent	Score	High points	High rebounds	High assists	Location Attendance	Series
1	October 25, 2026	Magnolia	W 92–70	Rondae Hollis-Jefferson (26)	Calvin Oftana (11)	Rondae Hollis-Jefferson (5)	Ynares Center Antipolo	1–0
2	October 28, 2026	Magnolia	W 91–73	Rondae Hollis-Jefferson (39)	Rondae Hollis-Jefferson (15)	Castro, Ganuelas-Rosser, Heading (3)	Ynares Center Antipolo	2–0
3	October 31, 2026	Magnolia	W 98–87	Rondae Hollis-Jefferson (38)	Brandon Ganuelas-Rosser (11)	Rey Nambatac (5)	Ninoy Aquino Stadium	3–0

Semifinals: 0–0

Game	Date	Opponent	Score	High points	High rebounds	High assists	Location Attendance	Series
1	December 4, 2026	Barangay Ginebra					Ninoy Aquino Stadium	
2	December 6, 2026	Barangay Ginebra					SM Mall of Asia Arena	
3	December 9, 2026	Barangay Ginebra					Ynares Center Antipolo	

== Transactions ==
=== Free agency ===
==== Signings ====
Player	Date signed	Contract amount	Contract length	Former team	Ref.
Brandon Ganuelas-Rosser	August 1, 2025	Not disclosed	2 years	Re-signed	
Kevin Ferrer	September 7, 2025	Not disclosed	1 year	Terrafirma Dyip	
Mike Nieto	September 7, 2025	Not disclosed	1 year	Re-signed	
Tyrus Hill	September 22, 2025	Not disclosed	1 year	Blackwater Bossing	
Henry Galinato	September 24, 2025	Not disclosed	2 years	Re-signed	
Jio Jalalon	October 4, 2025	Not disclosed	1 year	NorthPort Batang Pier	
Almond Vosotros	October 4, 2025	Not disclosed	1 conference	Re-signed	
Justin Chua	March 19, 2026	Not disclosed	Not disclosed	Blackwater Bossing	
Avan Nava	March 27, 2026	Not disclosed	Not disclosed	NorthPort Batang Pier	
Jeo Ambohot	September 29, 2026	Not disclosed	Rest of the season	Titan Ultra Giant Risers	
Jordan Heading	October 13, 2026	Not disclosed	3 years	Re-signed	

==== Subtractions ====
Player	Number	Position	Reason	New team	Ref.
Barkley Eboña	0	Power forward / Center	Released		
CJ Payawal	50	Small forward	Released	Cebu Greats (MPBL)	
Jielo Razon	99	Point guard	Released	Caloocan Batang Kankaloo (MPBL)	
Brian Heruela	13	Point guard	Released	Cebu Greats (MPBL)	
Almond Vosotros	26	Point guard	Released		
Justin Chua	18	Center	Free agent	Phoenix Super LPG Fuel Masters	

=== Recruited imports ===
Tournament	Name	Debuted	Last game	Record	Ref.
Commissioner's Cup	Bol Bol	March 20, 2026 (vs. Rain or Shine)	May 22, 2026 (vs. Meralco)	9–7	
Commissioner's Cup	Chris McCullough	May 27, 2026 (vs. Meralco)	June 17, 2026 (vs. Barangay Ginebra)	5–5	
Governors' Cup	Darius Days	July 19, 2026 (vs. Macau)	July 28, 2026 (vs. Converge)	2–2	
Governors' Cup	Rahlir Hollis-Jefferson	August 1, 2026 (vs. San Miguel)	August 11, 2026 (vs. NLEX)	2–2	
Governors' Cup	Nick Hornsby	October 7, 2026 (vs. Terrafirma)	October 10, 2026 (vs. San Miguel)	2–0	
Governors' Cup	Rondae Hollis-Jefferson	October 13, 2026 (vs. Macau)		4–1	
