= 2025–26 Blackwater Bossing season =

- Head coach: Jeffrey Cariaso; Patrick Aquino (interim, starting April 11, 2026)
- General manager: Johnson Martinez; Rhona Tibor (assistant)
- Governor: Silliman Sy
- Owner: Ever Bilena Cosmetics, Inc.

Philippine Cup results
- Record: 1–10 (9.1%)
- Place: 11th
- Playoff finish: Did not qualify

Commissioner's Cup results
- Record: 2–10 (16.7%)
- Place: 13th
- Playoff finish: Did not qualify

Governors' Cup results
- Record: 3–7 (30%)
- Place: 6th in group B
- Playoff finish: Did not qualify

Blackwater Bossing seasons

The 2025–26 Blackwater Bossing season was the 11th season of the franchise in the Philippine Basketball Association (PBA).

== Key dates ==
- September 7, 2025: The PBA season 50 draft was held at the SM Mall of Asia Music Hall in Pasay.

== Draft picks ==
Round	Pick	Player	Position	Place of birth	College
1	3	Dalph Panopio	PG	Italy	Cal State Bakersfield
2	15	Ximone Sandagon	PF/C	Philippines	FEU
3	27	Jack Cruz-Dumont	SG/SF	Philippines	UE
4	38	James Una	PF/C	Philippines	San Sebastian
5	49	Dominic Panlilio	PG	Philippines	Benilde
6	57	Gjerard Wilson	PG	United States	UE
7	63	Jude Codiñera	SG	Philippines	UST

== Roster ==
Blackwater Bossing roster
Players
Coaches

Pos.	#	POB	Name	Height	Weight	DOB (YYYY–MM–DD)	From
G	0	(Philippines)	RK Ilagan	5 ft 7 in (1.70 m)	150 lb (68 kg)	1997–04–03	San Sebastian
F/C	1	(Philippines)	Abu Tratter	6 ft 5 in (1.96 m)	215 lb (98 kg)	1993–01–09	De La Salle
G	2	(United States)	Sedrick Barefield	6 ft 2 in (1.88 m)	190 lb (86 kg)	1996–11–18	Utah
G	3	(United States)	Michael DiGregorio	6 ft 1 in (1.85 m)	180 lb (82 kg)	1991–12–12	McKendree
F	7	(Philippines)	Nick Demusis	6 ft 4 in (1.93 m)	205 lb (93 kg)	1991–05–09	Whittier
G	9	(Italy)	Dalph Panopio (R)	6 ft 1 in (1.85 m)	180 lb (82 kg)	2000–06–10	Cal State Bakersfield
F	10	(United States)	David Murrell	6 ft 4 in (1.93 m)	195 lb (88 kg)	1996–11–08	UP Diliman
G/F	12	(Philippines)	Jack Cruz-Dumont (R)	6 ft 3 in (1.91 m)		2000–10–14	UE
F	14	(Philippines)	Troy Mallillin	6 ft 4 in (1.93 m)	190 lb (86 kg)	1999–01–04	Ateneo
G/F	17	(Philippines)	CJ Austria (R)	6 ft 3 in (1.91 m)		2001–06–16	La Salle
F/C	19	(Philippines)	James Una (R)	6 ft 5 in (1.96 m)		2001–03–19	San Sebastian
F	23	(Philippines)	Richard Escoto	6 ft 3 in (1.91 m)	204 lb (93 kg)	1997–03–21	Far Eastern
F	24	(United States)	Kentrell Barkley (GI)	6 ft 5 in (1.96 m)	205 lb (93 kg)	1996–09–01	East Carolina
F	25	(Canada)	Christian David (injured)	6 ft 6 in (1.98 m)	215 lb (98 kg)	1998–06–19	Butler
G	26	(Philippines)	Jed Mendoza	5 ft 10 in (1.78 m)	160 lb (73 kg)	1996–06–21	UE
F	31	(Philippines)	James Sena	6 ft 5 in (1.96 m)	225 lb (102 kg)	1988–08–31	José Rizal
G	–	(Philippines)	Kib Montalbo (IN)	6 ft 0 in (1.83 m)	155 lb (70 kg)	1996–04–02	De La Salle
F/C	–	(Philippines)	Ximone Sandagon (injured) (R)	6 ft 4 in (1.93 m)		1999–03–10	Far Eastern

Head coach

- (Philippines) Patrick Aquino (interim)

Assistant coach(es)

- (Philippines) Joe Silva (1st assistant)
- (Philippines) Junjie Ablan
- (Philippines) Ryan Alba
- (United States) Mike Cortez
- (Philippines) Aries Dimaunahan
- (Philippines) John Ferriols
- (Philippines) Daniel Olan

Team manager

- (Philippines) Johnson Martinez
- (Philippines) Rhona Tibor (assistant)

Legend

- (C) Team captain
- (CI) Commissioner's Cup Import
- (GI) Governors' Cup Import
- (EI) EASL Import
- (DP) Unsigned draft pick
- (FA) Free agent
- (IN) Inactive
- (S) Suspended
- (R) Rookie
- Injured

Roster

== Philippine Cup ==
=== Eliminations ===
==== Standings ====
Pos	Team	W	L	PCT	GB	Qualification
1	San Miguel Beermen	9	2	.818	—	Twice-to-beat in the quarterfinals
2	Rain or Shine Elasto Painters	8	3	.727 (Note: Head-to-head record: Rain or Shine 1–0 TNT)	1	Twice-to-beat in the quarterfinals
3	TNT Tropang 5G	8	3	.727	1	Twice-to-beat in the quarterfinals
4	Converge FiberXers	7	4	.636 (Note: Head-to-head record: Converge 1–0 Barangay Ginebra)	2	Twice-to-beat in the quarterfinals
5	Barangay Ginebra San Miguel	7	4	.636	2	Twice-to-win in the quarterfinals
6	Magnolia Chicken Timplados Hotshots	6	5	.545 (Note: Head-to-head quotient: Magnolia 1.09, Meralco 0.99, NLEX 0.93)	3	Twice-to-win in the quarterfinals
7	Meralco Bolts	6	5	.545	3	Twice-to-win in the quarterfinals
8	NLEX Road Warriors	6	5	.545	3	Twice-to-win in the quarterfinals
9	Titan Ultra Giant Risers	4	7	.364	5	
10	Phoenix Fuel Masters	3	8	.273	6	
11	Blackwater Bossing	1	10	.091 (Note: Head-to-head record: Blackwater 1–0 Terrafirma)	8	
12	Terrafirma Dyip	1	10	.091	8	

Source: PBA.ph
Rules for classification: 1) winning percentage; 2) head-to-head goal average (quotient); 3) head-to-head record; 4) overall quotient; 5) coin toss

==== Game log ====
2025–26 PBA Philippine Cup game log
Total: 1–10
October: 1–3

Game	Date	Opponent	Score	High points	High rebounds	High assists	Location Attendance	Record
1	October 10, 2025	Terrafirma	W 107–87	Christian David (24)	RK Ilagan (10)	Dalph Panopio (4)	Ynares Center Montalban	1–0
2	October 15, 2025	Meralco	L 96–105	Sedrick Barefield (34)	David, Mallillin, Tratter (6)	Christian David (5)	Smart Araneta Coliseum	1–1
3	October 24, 2025	Rain or Shine	L 100–110	Richard Escoto (20)	Christian David (9)	Panopio, Zamar (3)	Ynares Center Antipolo	1–2
4	October 29, 2025	NLEX	L 88–99	Sedrick Barefield (19)	Sedrick Barefield (7)	Sedrick Barefield (5)	Ynares Center Antipolo	1–3

November: 0–3

Game	Date	Opponent	Score	High points	High rebounds	High assists	Location Attendance	Record
5	November 5, 2025	Titan Ultra	L 86–97	Sedrick Barefield (18)	David, Guinto (11)	Barefield, Mendoza, Murrell, Panopio (3)	Ninoy Aquino Stadium	1–4
6	November 8, 2025	Converge	L 94–99	Sedrick Barefield (33)	David, Panopio (7)	Dalph Panopio (7)	Ynares Center Antipolo	1–5
7	November 14, 2025	Magnolia	L 75–90	Sedrick Barefield (16)	Abu Tratter (10)	Barefield, Tratter (3)	Smart Araneta Coliseum	1–6

December: 0–4

Game	Date	Opponent	Score	High points	High rebounds	High assists	Location Attendance	Record
8	December 6, 2025	Phoenix	L 98–106	Sedrick Barefield (25)	Christian David (10)	Barefield, Panopio (5)	Ynares Center Antipolo	1–7
9	December 10, 2025	Barangay Ginebra	L 85–103	Dalph Panopio (22)	David, Panopio (8)	David, Panopio (3)	Ynares Center Antipolo	1–8
10	December 13, 2025	San Miguel	L 92–116	James Una (19)	James Una (12)	Ichie Altamirano (6)	Ynares Center Antipolo	1–9
11	December 19, 2025	TNT	L 96–113	Troy Mallillin (20)	Guinto, Jopia (8)	Jack Cruz-Dumont (4)	Ninoy Aquino Stadium	1–10

== Commissioner's Cup ==
=== Eliminations ===
==== Standings ====
Pos	Team	W	L	PCT	GB	Qualification
1	NLEX Road Warriors	10	2	.833	—	Twice-to-beat in the quarterfinals
2	Barangay Ginebra San Miguel	9	3	.750 (Note: Head-to-head record: Barangay Ginebra 1–0 Rain or Shine)	1	Twice-to-beat in the quarterfinals
3	Rain or Shine Elasto Painters	9	3	.750	1	Twice-to-beat in the quarterfinals
4	Meralco Bolts	8	4	.667	2	Twice-to-beat in the quarterfinals
5	Magnolia Chicken Timplados Hotshots	7	5	.583 (Note: Head-to-head record: Magnolia 1–0 San Miguel)	3	Twice-to-win in the quarterfinals
6	San Miguel Beermen	7	5	.583	3	Twice-to-win in the quarterfinals
7	Phoenix Super LPG Fuel Masters	6	6	.500 (Note: Head-to-head record: Phoenix Super LPG 1–0 TNT)	4	Twice-to-win in the quarterfinals
8	TNT Tropang 5G	6	6	.500	4	Twice-to-win in the quarterfinals
9	Converge FiberXers	5	7	.417	5	
10	Terrafirma Dyip	4	8	.333	6	
11	Macau Black Knights	3	9	.250	7	
12	Titan Ultra Giant Risers	2	10	.167 (Note: Head-to-head record: Titan Ultra 1–0 Blackwater)	8	
13	Blackwater Bossing	2	10	.167	8	

Source: PBA.ph
Rules for classification: 1) winning percentage; 2) head-to-head goal average (quotient); 3) head-to-head record; 4) overall quotient; 5) coin toss

==== Game log ====
2026 PBA Commissioner's Cup game log
Total: 2–10
March: 1–3

Game	Date	Opponent	Score	High points	High rebounds	High assists	Location Attendance	Record
1	March 13, 2026	NLEX	L 81–84	Sedrick Barefield (18)	Daniel Ochefu (16)	Dalph Panopio (5)	Ninoy Aquino Stadium	0–1
2	March 18, 2026	Terrafirma	L 88–99	Sedrick Barefield (25)	Ochefu, Tratter (7)	David, Ilagan (4)	Ynares Center Antipolo	0–2
3	March 22, 2026	Magnolia	W 97–91	Robert Upshaw (35)	Robert Upshaw (14)	Robert Upshaw (6)	Ynares Center Antipolo	1–2
4	March 31, 2026	Rain or Shine	L 95–151	Robert Upshaw (24)	Robert Upshaw (9)	Panopio, Upshaw (3)	Ninoy Aquino Stadium	1–3

April: 1–5

Game	Date	Opponent	Score	High points	High rebounds	High assists	Location Attendance	Record
5	April 8, 2026	Titan Ultra	L 98–102	Barefield, Upshaw (25)	Christian David (12)	RK Ilagan (4)	Ninoy Aquino Stadium	1–4
6	April 14, 2026	TNT	L 94–99	Robert Upshaw (36)	Christian David (11)	Barefield, Panopio (4)	Ynares Center Antipolo	1–5
7	April 17, 2026	Phoenix Super LPG	L 108–125	Robert Upshaw (36)	Tratter, Upshaw (9)	Murrell, Zamar (3)	Ynares Center Montalban	1–6
8	April 22, 2026	San Miguel	W 126–120	Robert Upshaw (35)	Robert Upshaw (17)	Sedrick Barefield (8)	Ninoy Aquino Stadium	2–6
9	April 24, 2026	Barangay Ginebra	L 108–115	Robert Upshaw (43)	Robert Upshaw (14)	Sedrick Barefield (12)	Smart Araneta Coliseum	2–7
10	April 28, 2026	Macau	L 119–123	David, Zamar (21)	Bradwyn Guinto (9)	BJ Andrade (5)	Ninoy Aquino Stadium	2–8

May: 0–2

Game	Date	Opponent	Score	High points	High rebounds	High assists	Location Attendance	Record
11	May 3, 2026	Meralco	L 93–108	Robert Upshaw (31)	Robert Upshaw (12)	Sedrick Barefield (5)	Smart Araneta Coliseum	2–9
12	May 9, 2026	Converge	L 122–136	Robert Upshaw (45)	Robert Upshaw (18)	CJ Austria (4)	Ynares Center Antipolo	2–10

== Governors' Cup ==
=== Eliminations ===
==== Standings ====
Pos	Team	W	L	PCT	GB	Qualification
1	q – Magnolia Chicken Timplados Hotshots	7	3	.700	—	Quarterfinals
2	q – Rain or Shine Elasto Painters	6	4	.600	1	Quarterfinals
3	q – Barangay Ginebra San Miguel	5	5	.500 (Note: Head-to-head quotient: Barangay Ginebra 1.08, Phoenix Super LPG 0.92)	2	Quarterfinals
4	q – Phoenix Super LPG Fuel Masters	5	5	.500	2	Quarterfinals
5	e – Meralco Bolts	4	6	.400	3	
6	e – Blackwater Bossing	3	7	.300	4	

Source: PBA.ph
Rules for classification: 1) winning percentage; 2) if two teams are tied, head-to-head record, if three or more teams are tied, head-to-head goal average (quotient); 3) overall quotient; 4) coin toss
e – Eliminated; q – Qualified for the phase indicated

==== Game log ====
2026 PBA Governors' Cup game log
Total: 3–7
July: 2–3

Game	Date	Opponent	Score	High points	High rebounds	High assists	Location Attendance	Record
1	July 11, 2026	Rain or Shine	W 131–108	Kentrell Barkley (29)	Kentrell Barkley (15)	Kentrell Barkley (10)	Ynares Center Montalban	1–0
2	July 17, 2026	Magnolia	W 89–81	Kentrell Barkley (26)	Barkley, Tratter (11)	Sedrick Barefield (4)	Ninoy Aquino Stadium	2–0
3	July 21, 2026	Meralco	L 114–116	Sedrick Barefield (29)	Kentrell Barkley (10)	Barkley, Ilagan (4)	Ynares Center Antipolo	2–1
4	July 24, 2026	Barangay Ginebra	L 85–115	Kentrell Barkley (26)	Kentrell Barkley (10)	Sedrick Barefield (5)	Smart Araneta Coliseum	2–2
5	July 28, 2026	Phoenix Super LPG	L 93–102	Kentrell Barkley (36)	Kentrell Barkley (25)	RK Ilagan (4)	Ninoy Aquino Stadium	2–3

August: 1–0

Game	Date	Opponent	Score	High points	High rebounds	High assists	Location Attendance	Record
6	August 5, 2026	Phoenix Super LPG	W 106–100	Kentrell Barkley (34)	Kentrell Barkley (16)	Barefield, Barkley (3)	Smart Araneta Coliseum	3–3

October: 0–4

Game	Date	Opponent	Score	High points	High rebounds	High assists	Location Attendance	Record
7	October 9, 2026	Magnolia	L 101–107	Sedrick Barefield (24)	Kentrell Barkley (13)	Kentrell Barkley (8)	Ninoy Aquino Stadium	3–4
8	October 13, 2026	Meralco	L 115–120	Sedrick Barefield (31)	Kentrell Barkley (11)	Kentrell Barkley (5)	Ninoy Aquino Stadium	3–5
9	October 17, 2026	Rain or Shine	L 123–125	Kentrell Barkley (35)	Kentrell Barkley (15)	RK Ilagan (4)	Ynares Center Antipolo	3–6
10	October 23, 2026	Barangay Ginebra	L 96–101	Kentrell Barkley (16)	Kentrell Barkley (9)	RK Ilagan (4)	Ynares Center Antipolo	3–7

== Transactions ==
=== Free agency ===
==== Signings ====
Player	Date signed	Contract amount	Contract length	Former team	Ref.
Paul Zamar	July 30, 2025	Not disclosed	Not disclosed	NorthPort Batang Pier	
Richard Escoto	August 2, 2025	Not disclosed	2 years	Re-signed	
Troy Mallillin	August 2, 2025	Not disclosed	2 years	Re-signed	
David Murrell	September 9, 2025	Not disclosed	1 year	Barangay Ginebra San Miguel	
Christian David	September 12, 2025	Not disclosed	2 years	Re-signed	
Jed Mendoza	September 20, 2025	Not disclosed	1 year	Magnolia Chicken Timplados Hotshots	
CJ Austria	April 21, 2026	Not disclosed	1 year	Titan Ultra Giant Risers (Note: CJ Austria signed a rookie contract with Titan Ultra last February 18, 2026 but he did not play any single game with the team because he was released by the team.)	
Michael DiGregorio	May 8, 2026	Not disclosed	Not disclosed	Pangasinan Heatwaves (MPBL)	
Nick Demusis	June 29, 2026	Not disclosed	Rest of the season	Nueva Ecija Rice Vanguards (MPBL)	
James Sena	July 5, 2026	Not disclosed	Rest of the season	Iloilo United Royals (MPBL)	

==== Subtractions ====
Player	Number	Position	Reason	New team	Ref.
Mike Ayonayon	28	Shooting guard / Point guard	Going to other leagues	Abra Solid North Weavers (MPBL)	
Miguel Corteza	12	Power forward / Small forward	Contract not renewed	Muntinlupa Cagers (MPBL)	
Prince Caperal	4	Center / Power forward	Contract not renewed	Phoenix Fuel Masters	
Tyrus Hill	21, 33	Power forward / Small forward	Free agent	TNT Tropang 5G	
JVee Casio	42, 6	Point guard	Retired / Going to other leagues	Basilan Steel (MPBL)	
Justin Chua	9, 18	Center	Free agent	TNT Tropang 5G	
Jaydee Tungcab	5	Shooting guard / Small forward	Free agent	Converge FiberXers	
Ichie Altamirano	24	Point guard	Released	Cebu Greats (MPBL)	
Paul Zamar	5	Shooting guard / Point guard	Contract not renewed	Batangas City Athletics (MPBL)	
Bradwyn Guinto	8	Center / Power forward	Released		
Clifford Jopia	13	Center	Released	Magnolia Chicken Timplados Hotshots	
BJ Andrade	10	Shooting guard / Small forward	Going overseas	Winling (A1 Division)	

=== Recruited imports ===
Tournament	Name	Debuted	Last game	Record	Ref.
Commissioner's Cup	Daniel Ochefu	March 13, 2026 (vs. NLEX)	March 18, 2026 (vs. Terrafirma)	0–2	
Commissioner's Cup	Robert Upshaw	March 22, 2026 (vs. Magnolia)	May 9, 2026 (vs. Converge)	2–7	
Governors’ Cup	Kentrell Barkley	July 11, 2026 (vs. Rain or Shine)	October 23, 2026 (vs. Barangay Ginebra)	3–7	
