= Sedrick Barefield =

Filipino-American basketball player

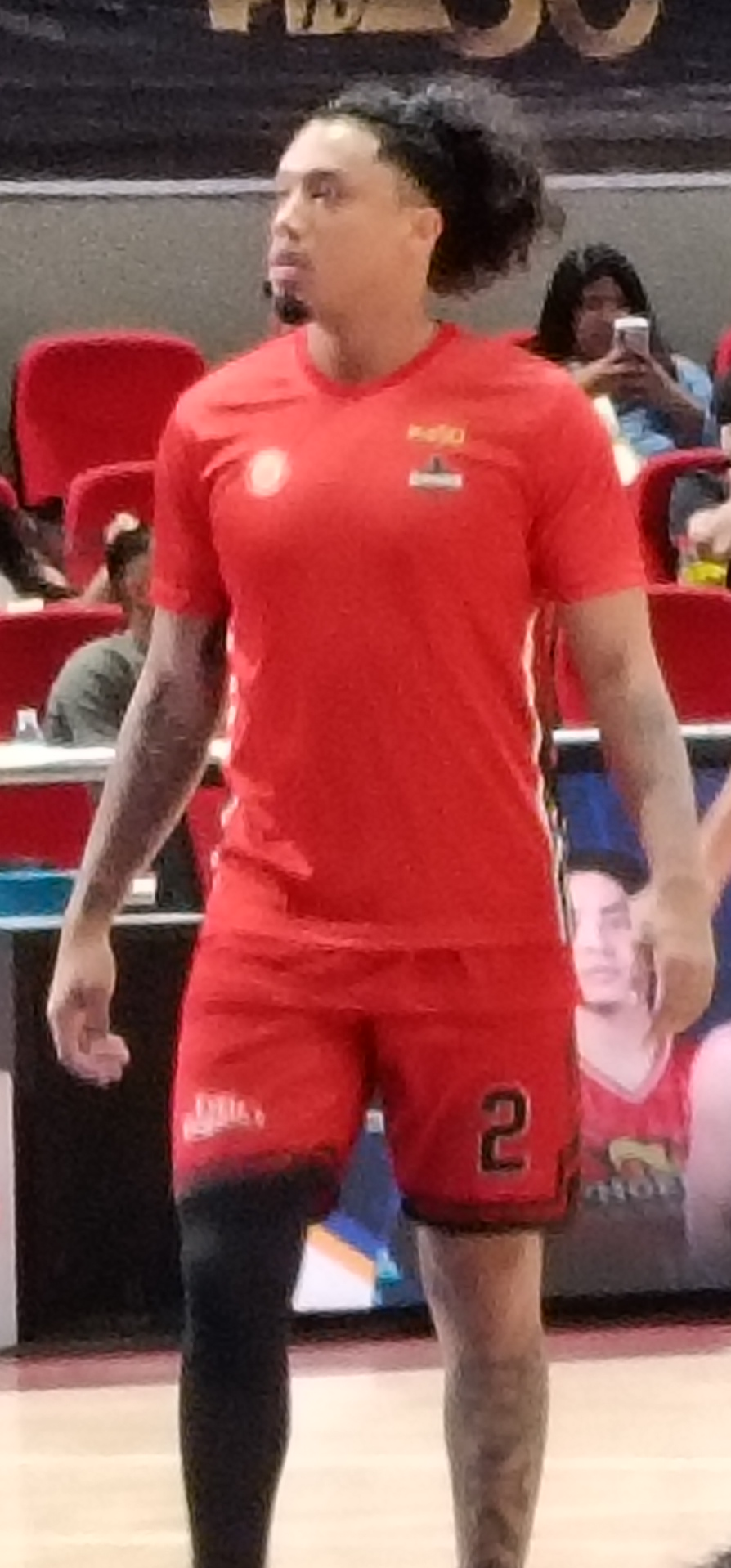
- Barefield with the Blackwater Bossing in 2025

No. 2 – Blackwater Bossing
- Position: Point guard / shooting guard
- League: PBA

Personal information
- Born: November 18, 1996 (age 29) Corona, California, U.S.
- Listed height: 6 ft 2 in (1.88 m)
- Listed weight: 190 lb (86 kg)

Career information
- High school: Centennial (Corona, California)
- College: SMU (2015–2016); Utah (2016–2019)
- NBA draft: 2019: undrafted
- PBA draft: 2024: 1st round, 2nd overall pick
- Drafted by: Blackwater Bossing
- Playing career: 2019–present

Career history
- 2019–2020: Oklahoma City Blue
- 2020–2021: Nevėžis Kėdainiai
- 2021: Apollon Patras
- 2022: Oklahoma City Blue
- 2022: Tainan TSG GhostHawks
- 2023: Bay Area Dragons
- 2023: SLAC
- 2023–2024: Taipei Fubon Braves
- 2024–present: Blackwater Bossing

Career highlights
- PBA All-Rookie Team (2025); First-team All-Pac-12 (2019)
- Stats at Basketball Reference

Sedrick Lee Barefield (born November 18, 1996) is a Filipino-American professional basketball player for the Blackwater Bossing of the Philippine Basketball Association (PBA). He played college basketball for the SMU Mustangs and the Utah Utes.

== High school career ==
In 2013, Barefield averaged 17.4 points, 4.4 assists, 2.2 rebounds and 2.3 steals in 33 matches while piloting his school to the championship game of the 2014 California Interscholastic Federation (CIF) State Division 1 Basketball tournament. Some of his individual accolades include being named as co-MVP with fellow Fil-Am Ethan Alvano in the Big VIII tournament that season, as well as being selected to the CIF All-State Team. He also got to play in the international showcase Adidas Nations.

In 2014, Barefield helped his team win the Tip-Off Tournament. He averaged 20.6 points, 4.2 assists, 2.2 rebounds and 1.4 steals per game that season, led the Huskies to a 25–6 record, the CIF-State Div.1 regional final and a No.4 final state ranking by MaxPreps. He was selected Big VIII League MVP and All-CIF, to go along with his multiple all-tournament awards and honors.

On February 17, 2014, Barefield committed to SMU. He made formal his desire to suit up for the Larry Brown-mentored squad by signing his Letter of Intent on November 12 of that year.

College recruiting
Name	Hometown	School	Height	Weight	Commit date
Sedrick Barefield; PG	Corona, California	Centennial	6 ft 2 in (1.88 m)	190 lb (86 kg)	Feb 17, 2014
Sedrick Barefield; PG	Recruit ratings: Rivals: 247Sports: ESPN: (79)				
Overall recruit ranking: Rivals: 128 247Sports: 157, 29 (PG) ESPN: 35 (PG)
Note: In many cases, Scout, Rivals, 247Sports, On3, and ESPN may conflict in their listings of height and weight.; In these cases, the average was taken. ESPN grades are on a 100-point scale.; Sources: "2015 SMU Basketball Commitment List". Rivals.; "2015 SMU Basketball Commitment List". ESPN.; "2015 Team Ranking". Rivals.

== College career ==
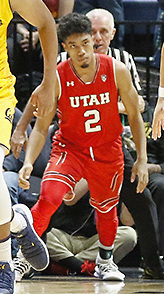
Barefield with the Utah Utes in 2019

Barefield played college basketball for the SMU Mustangs before transferring to Utah. At SMU, he only played in five games. Coach Brown assisted his transfer to Utah with a call to Larry Krystkowiak, Utah's head coach.

Barefield missed several of the first games of Utah's 2016–17 season due to transfer rules. In his debut, he scored 18 points. He then scored 35 points several days later in a loss to the San Francisco Dons. He then cooled down after that, scoring only a total of nine points in his next two games. In a close loss to the UCLA Bruins, he scored 13 points. In March, he helped Utah beat the California Golden Bears with his 14 points. That season, Utah lost to California in the first round of the Pac-12 tournament when he missed a three that could have sent the game to overtime. They also lost in the first round to the Boise State Broncos in the NIT.

In his junior season debut, Barefield scored 22 points in a win over the Prairie View A&M Panthers. He then contracted a stomach virus, causing him to miss the following game, yet Utah won by 40 over the Mississippi Valley State Delta Devils without him. Later that season, he had 23 points in a loss to the Arizona Wildcats. In a matchup against fellow Fil-Am point guard Remy Martin of the Arizona State Sun Devils, he had 21 points, but Martin's team took the victory. He then had a shooting slump and had to come off the bench after starting for majority of the season. He then had 14 points and three assists off the bench in a win over the Washington State Cougars. In a rematch with Arizona State, he scored 17 points and hit the game-tying 3-pointer with 1.8 seconds left in regulation, helping Utah knock off the Sun Devils in overtime. The following game, a rematch with Arizona, he led Utah with 26 points, but they lost. That season, Utah made it all the way to the championship round of the NIT, in which he scored 22 points with six threes, but they lost to the Penn State Nittany Lions.

Barefield declared for the 2018 NBA draft, and had worked out for the Utah Jazz and Los Angeles Lakers. However, he backed out and returned for one more season with Utah. He started that season with 18 points and nine assists in a win over the Maine Black Bears. He started the Utes’ first nine games and then, after going 1 for 7 against the Kentucky Wildcats, began coming off the bench. Three games later, he dropped 33 points on the Nevada Wolf Pack off the bench and moved back in the lineup. Against Arizona State, he had a game-high 24 points. Against Arizona, he had 26 points, but fouled out, allowing Arizona to win in overtime. He matched his season high in points in a win over Washington State. He earned All-Pac-12 honors that season while also totaling 1,000 points in his college career. His college career ended with a loss to the Oregon Ducks in the first round of the Pac-12 tournament. As a senior at Utah, he averaged 16.8 points, 3.8 assists and 2.1 rebounds per game.

== Professional career ==
After going undrafted in the 2019 NBA draft, Barefield signed with the Oklahoma City Thunder of the National Basketball Association (NBA) for NBA Summer League. He subsequently joined the Oklahoma City Blue of the NBA G League. Barefield posted 29 points, one rebound, one assist and one steal in a 149–117 win over the Stockton Kings on January 17, 2020. He averaged 9.0 points, 1.4 rebounds and 1.4 assists per game, shooting 39 percent from behind the arc.

On July 16, 2020, Barefield signed with Nevėžis Kėdainiai of the Lithuanian Basketball League. He scored 22 points in a close loss to BC Šiauliai. Against Rytas Vilnius, he put up 29 points, but they still lost their sixth consecutive game. Several months later, he recorded 28 points in the final game of the regular season, but his team still fell to dead last in the league.

Barefiel joined Apollon Patras in Greece after his stint in Lithuania. In three games, he registered 3.0 points in 12.6 minutes of play.

On February 27, 2022, Barefield was reacquired by the Oklahoma City Blue.

In May 2022, Barefield declared for the PBA season 47 draft. However, he was not able to join the draft, as he failed to submit his passport to the league before the deadline.

On September 8, 2022, Barefield signed with the Taipei Fubon Braves of the P. League+. However, he never played for the team.

On October 11, 2022, Barefield signed with the Tainan TSG GhostHawks of the T1 League. He only played one game for them before being released by the team.

On February 7, 2023, it was reported that Barefield signed with the Bay Area Dragons of the East Asia Super League as their Asian import. The contract only lasted for the EASL Champions Week. He helped Bay Area claim third place in that tournament.

In April 2023, Barefield joined Guinean club SLAC of the Basketball Africa League (BAL), qualifying as an import player in the 2023 season.

== Career statistics ==
Legend
GP	Games played	MPG	Minutes per game	FG%	Field goal percentage
3P%	3-point field goal percentage	FT%	Free throw percentage	RPG	Rebounds per game
APG	Assists per game	SPG	Steals per game	BPG	Blocks per game
PPG	Points per game	**Bold**	Career high		Led the league

=== International ===
Year	Team	League	GP	MPG	FG%	3P%	FT%	RPG	APG	SPG	BPG	PPG
2020–21	Nevėžis Kėdainiai	LKL	**28**	**28.1**	**.388**	**.359**	**.802**	**1.8**	**2.5**	**.8**	**.0**	**15.5**
2021–22	Apollon Patras	GBL	3	12.6	.235	.125	.000	.3	.0	.7	.0	3.0
Career		All Leagues	31	26.6	.382	.350	.802	1.7	2.3	.7	.1	14.3

=== College ===
Year	Team	GP	GS	MPG	FG%	3P%	FT%	RPG	APG	SPG	BPG	PPG
2015–16	SMU	5	0	3.2	.000	.000	.000	.8	.4	.0	.0	.0
2016–17	Utah	24	3	22.6	**.417**	**.393**	.737	1.8	2.0	.8	.0	9.0
2017–18	Utah	**32**	24	29.2	.401	.354	.847	**2.2**	2.5	.8	**.1**	12.0
2018–19	Utah	31	**28**	**32.2**	.408	.388	.825	2.1	**3.8**	**.9**	.0	**16.8**
Career		92	55	27.1	.406	.376	.811	2.0	2.7	.8	.0	12.2

=== BAL ===
Legend
GP	Games played	GS	Games started	MPG	Minutes per game
FG%	Field goal percentage	3P%	3-point field goal percentage	FT%	Free throw percentage
RPG	Rebounds per game	APG	Assists per game	SPG	Steals per game
BPG	Blocks per game	PPG	Points per game	**Bold**	Career high

Year	Team	GP	GS	MPG	FG%	3P%	FT%	RPG	APG	SPG	BPG	PPG
2023	SLAC	1	1	22.5	.333	.400	.000	2.0	3.0	2.0	.0	8.0

=== PBA ===
Legend
GP	Games played	MPG	Minutes per game	FG%	Field-goal percentage
3FG%	3-point field-goal percentage	4P%	4-point field-goal percentage	FT%	Free-throw percentage
RPG	Rebounds per game	APG	Assists per game	SPG	Steals per game
BPG	Blocks per game	PPG	Points per game	**127**	Career high

As of the end of 2025–26 season

=== Season-by-season averages ===
Year	Team	GP	MPG	FG%	3P%	4P%	FT%	RPG	APG	SPG	BPG	PPG
2024–25	Blackwater	24	31.9	.397	**.314**	**.227**	.729	2.8	**3.8**	**.9**	.0	18.4
2025–26	Blackwater	**32**	**33.9**	**.398**	.307	.185	**.755**	**3.7**	3.2	.7	**.2**	**20.6**
Career		56	31.9	.397	.310	.204	.745	3.3	3.4	.8	.1	19.6

== Personal life ==
Barefield is of Filipino descent through his mother. He became a Filipino citizen prior to joining the PBA season 47 draft. His father, Ray Barefield, is a former point guard for San Diego State and current head coach of Rancho Christian's boys' basketball program. He has a sister, Tia, who is currently playing basketball for the girls' program of Rancho Christian.
