= Brandon Bates =

Filipino-Australian basketball player (born 1996)

No. 33 – Meralco Bolts
- Position: Center
- League: PBA

Personal information
- Born: August 12, 1996 (age 30)
- Listed height: 6 ft 9 in (2.06 m)
- Listed weight: 231 lb (105 kg)

Career information
- College: De La Salle
- PBA draft: 2023: 1st round, 8th overall pick
- Drafted by: Meralco Bolts
- Playing career: 2022–present

Career history
- 2022–2023: Sutherland Sharks
- 2023–present: Meralco Bolts

Career highlights
- PBA champion (2024 Philippine); PBA All-Star Week Obstacle Challenge (Big Man) champion (2026); PBA D-League champion (2022 Aspirants')

Brandon Matthew Bates (born August 12, 1996) is a Filipino-Australian basketball player for the Meralco Bolts of the Philippine Basketball Association (PBA).

== Collegiate career ==
Bates played for De La Salle Green Archers men's basketball team starting in 2018. In the first round of his first season (2019), he only averaged 1.8 points on 36% shooting, on top of 7.2 rebounds and 0.6 blocks in 17 minutes of play. He later proved to be a reliable interior defender and rebounder. He scored 10 points, 15 rebounds, and two blocks on an elimination game against UST De La Salle won the game 80–79. Before leaving La Salle, he averaged 8.43 rebounds.

== Professional career ==
=== Australia ===
Bates left La Salle to join the Sutherland Sharks of NBL1 in Australia.

=== Meralco Bolts ===
Bates got selected by Meralco Bolts in the 2023 PBA draft as 8th overall, but he did not sign a contract earlier because he wanted to go home to Australia.

Sharing play time in centre position with Raymond Almazan, he was seen as an energizer with a shot-blocking ability. He had 6 blocks and 13 rebounds in the Game 7 semifinal match vs. Ginebra in 2024 PBA Philippine Cup. He helped his team to win the first championship against San Miguel Beermen. His most notable game was playing with flu in Game 5 while guarding June Mar Fajardo. Another notable moment was a dunk in Game 6.

== PBA career statistics ==
Legend
GP	Games played	MPG	Minutes per game	FG%	Field-goal percentage
3FG%	3-point field-goal percentage	4P%	4-point field-goal percentage	FT%	Free-throw percentage
RPG	Rebounds per game	APG	Assists per game	SPG	Steals per game
BPG	Blocks per game	PPG	Points per game	127	Career high

As of the end of 2025–26 season

=== Season-by-season averages ===
Year	Team	GP	MPG	FG%	3P%	4P%	FT%	RPG	APG	SPG	BPG	PPG
2023–24	Meralco	30	16.8	.625	—	—	.275	5.1	.4	.3	1.3	3.5
2024–25	Meralco	35	16.6	.550	—	—	.444	5.5	.5	.2	.9	3.5
2025–26	Meralco	43	18.2	.603	—	—	.518	6.3	.3	.3	1.0	4.2
Career		108	17.3	.591	—	—	.410	5.7	.4	.3	1.0	3.8

== Personal life ==
Bates worked as a barista while studying in La Salle.

He is currently dating Rocio Trillo, the eldest daughter of Bolts' head coach Luigi Trillo.
