= Riley Grigsby =

American basketball player (born 1999)

Free agent
- Position: Small forward / power forward

Personal information
- Born: December 29, 1999 (age 26) San Jose, California, U.S.
- Listed height: 6 ft 6 in (1.98 m)
- Listed weight: 220 lb (100 kg)

Career information
- High school: Archbishop Mitty (San Jose, California)
- College: Seattle (2018–2023)
- NBA draft: 2023: undrafted
- Playing career: 2024–present

Career history
- 2024–2025: AB Contern
- 2025–2026: Santa Cruz Warriors
- 2026: Sioux Falls Skyforce
- 2026: Barangay Ginebra San Miguel

Riley James Grigsby (born December 29, 1999) is an American basketball player. He played college basketball for the Seattle Redhawks.

== Early life and education ==
Riley Grigsby was born on December 29, 1999, in San Jose, California. His father, Alfred was a professional basketball player who plied his trade in Japan. He attended the Archbishop Mitty High School and later the Seattle University on a full Division I scholarship. He graduated from Seattle University in 2022 with a degree in communications.

== Career ==
=== College ===
Grigsby played for the Seattle Redhawks in the Western Athletic Conference. He played until 2023, a year after his graduation due to distruptions caused by the COVID-19 pandemic.

=== Club ===
After graduating, Grigbsy initially competed in the FIBA 3x3 Pro Circuit before shifting back to the standard 5x5 to suit up for AB Contern of the Luxembourg Basketball League for the 2024–25 season. He then joined the NBA G League to play for the Santa Cruz Warriors and later the Sioux Falls Skyforce.

In July 2026, he joined the Barangay Ginebra San Miguel of the Philippine Basketball Association as a temporary replacement for injured resident import Justin Brownlee for the 2026 PBA Governors' Cup.
