= 2025–26 Magnolia Chicken Timplados Hotshots season =

- Head coach: LA Tenorio
- General manager: Alvin Patrimonio
- Governor: Jason Webb
- Owners: San Miguel Pure Foods Company, Inc. (a San Miguel Corporation subsidiary)

Philippine Cup results
- Record: 6–5 (54.5%)
- Place: 6th
- Playoff finish: Quarterfinalist (lost to TNT with twice-to-win disadvantage)

Commissioner's Cup results
- Record: 7–5 (58.3%)
- Place: 5th
- Playoff finish: Quarterfinalist (lost to Meralco with twice-to-win disadvantage)

Governors' Cup results
- Record: 7–3 (70%)
- Place: 1st in group B
- Playoff finish: Quarterfinalist (lost to TNT, 0–3)

Magnolia Chicken Timplados Hotshots seasons

The 2025–26 Magnolia Chicken Timplados Hotshots season was the 37th season of the franchise in the Philippine Basketball Association (PBA).

== Key dates ==
- September 7, 2025: The PBA season 50 draft was held at the SM Mall of Asia Music Hall in Pasay.

== Draft picks ==
Round	Pick	Player	Position	Place of birth	College
1	11	Yukien Andrada	PF	Philippines	San Beda
3	30	Gab Gomez	PG	Italy	Ateneo
4	41	Joshua Yerro	SG/SF	Philippines	Adamson

== Roster ==
Magnolia Chicken Timplados Hotshots roster
Players
Coaches

Pos.	#	POB	Name	Height	Weight	DOB (YYYY–MM–DD)	From
G	0	(Philippines)	Paolo Taha	6 ft 0 in (1.83 m)	180 lb (82 kg)	1990–12–05	St. Benilde
F	1	(United States)	KJ Buffen (GI)	6 ft 8 in (2.03 m)	230 lb (104 kg)	2000–05–27	UAB
G/F	2	(Philippines)	Javi Gómez de Liaño	6 ft 3 in (1.91 m)	193 lb (88 kg)	1998–07–27	Philippines
G	3	(Philippines)	Paul Lee	6 ft 0 in (1.83 m)	200 lb (91 kg)	1989–02–14	UE
G	5	(Philippines)	LA Tenorio (IN)	5 ft 9 in (1.75 m)	151 lb (68 kg)	1984–07–09	Ateneo
G/F	6	(United States)	Chris Koon (R)	6 ft 5 in (1.96 m)		2001–02–06	Ateneo
C	10	(Philippines)	Ian Sangalang	6 ft 7 in (2.01 m)	212 lb (96 kg)	1991–12–20	San Sebastian
G	13	(Italy)	Gab Gomez (R)	5 ft 11 in (1.80 m)		2000–03–20	Ateneo
G	14	(Philippines)	Mark Barroca	5 ft 10 in (1.78 m)	170 lb (77 kg)	1986–04–25	Far Eastern
G	17	(Philippines)	Peter Alfaro	5 ft 11 in (1.80 m)		1998–12–17	San Beda
F	19	(United States)	Rome dela Rosa	6 ft 3 in (1.91 m)	185 lb (84 kg)	1990–12–11	San Beda
F	21	(Philippines)	Yukien Andrada (R)	6 ft 5 in (1.96 m)		2001–04–21	San Beda
F	22	(United States)	Zavier Lucero	6 ft 6 in (1.98 m)	205 lb (93 kg)	1999–04–05	Philippines
C	23	(Philippines)	Clifford Jopia	6 ft 8 in (2.03 m)	220 lb (100 kg)	1998–05–11	San Beda
G	30	(Philippines)	Jerom Lastimosa	5 ft 11 in (1.80 m)		1998–07–01	Adamson
F	41	(United States)	Raffy Verano	6 ft 3 in (1.91 m)	200 lb (91 kg)	1997–11–16	Ateneo
C	42	(Australia)	James Laput	6 ft 10 in (2.08 m)	245 lb (111 kg)	1996–08–26	De La Salle
F/C	88	(Philippines)	Russel Escoto (injured)	6 ft 6 in (1.98 m)	200 lb (91 kg)	1992–12–04	Far Eastern

Head coach

- (Philippines) LA Tenorio

Assistant coach(es)

- (Philippines) Juno Sauler (1st assistant)
- (United States) Kirk Collier
- (Philippines) Angelito Esguerra
- (Philippines) Tonyboy Espinosa
- (Philippines) Monch Gavieres
- (Philippines) Mon Jose
- (Philippines) Jude Paulite
- (Philippines) Julian Ramos
- (Philippines) Paul Sorongon
- (Philippines) Erick Arejola (consultant)

Team manager

- (Philippines) Alvin Patrimonio

Legend

- (C) Team captain
- (CI) Commissioner's Cup Import
- (GI) Governors' Cup Import
- (EI) EASL Import
- (DP) Unsigned draft pick
- (FA) Free agent
- (IN) Inactive
- (S) Suspended
- (R) Rookie
- Injured

Roster

== Philippine Cup ==
=== Eliminations ===
==== Standings ====
Pos	Team	W	L	PCT	GB	Qualification
1	San Miguel Beermen	9	2	.818	—	Twice-to-beat in the quarterfinals
2	Rain or Shine Elasto Painters	8	3	.727 (Note: Head-to-head record: Rain or Shine 1–0 TNT)	1	Twice-to-beat in the quarterfinals
3	TNT Tropang 5G	8	3	.727	1	Twice-to-beat in the quarterfinals
4	Converge FiberXers	7	4	.636 (Note: Head-to-head record: Converge 1–0 Barangay Ginebra)	2	Twice-to-beat in the quarterfinals
5	Barangay Ginebra San Miguel	7	4	.636	2	Twice-to-win in the quarterfinals
6	Magnolia Chicken Timplados Hotshots	6	5	.545 (Note: Head-to-head quotient: Magnolia 1.09, Meralco 0.99, NLEX 0.93)	3	Twice-to-win in the quarterfinals
7	Meralco Bolts	6	5	.545	3	Twice-to-win in the quarterfinals
8	NLEX Road Warriors	6	5	.545	3	Twice-to-win in the quarterfinals
9	Titan Ultra Giant Risers	4	7	.364	5	
10	Phoenix Fuel Masters	3	8	.273	6	
11	Blackwater Bossing	1	10	.091 (Note: Head-to-head record: Blackwater 1–0 Terrafirma)	8	
12	Terrafirma Dyip	1	10	.091	8	

Source: PBA.ph
Rules for classification: 1) winning percentage; 2) head-to-head goal average (quotient); 3) head-to-head record; 4) overall quotient; 5) coin toss

==== Game log ====
2025–26 PBA Philippine Cup game log
Total: 6–5
October: 4–1

Game	Date	Opponent	Score	High points	High rebounds	High assists	Location Attendance	Record
1	October 5, 2025	Barangay Ginebra	W 80–73	Zavier Lucero (17)	Zavier Lucero (7)	Barroca, Lastimosa (5)	Smart Araneta Coliseum	1–0
2	October 17, 2025	Titan Ultra	W 127–119	Zavier Lucero (23)	Zavier Lucero (17)	Mark Barroca (7)	Smart Araneta Coliseum	2–0
3	October 19, 2025	Meralco	L 76–78	Jerom Lastimosa (22)	Mark Barroca (11)	Mark Barroca (5)	Ynares Center Montalban	2–1
4	October 25, 2025	Terrafirma	W 104–93	Mark Barroca (17)	Zavier Lucero (9)	Rome dela Rosa (5)	Ynares Center Antipolo	3–1
5	October 31, 2025	Phoenix	W 83–80	Jerom Lastimosa (14)	Javi Gómez de Liaño (9)	Paul Lee (5)	Ynares Center Antipolo	4–1

November: 1–1

Game	Date	Opponent	Score	High points	High rebounds	High assists	Location Attendance	Record
6	November 7, 2025	San Miguel	L 92–94	Zavier Lucero (20)	Zavier Lucero (14)	Jerom Lastimosa (6)	Ynares Center Montalban	4–2
7	November 14, 2025	Blackwater	W 90–75	Javi Gómez de Liaño (17)	Zavier Lucero (10)	Jerom Lastimosa (7)	Smart Araneta Coliseum	5–2

December: 1–3

Game	Date	Opponent	Score	High points	High rebounds	High assists	Location Attendance	Record
8	December 5, 2025	Converge	L 97–114	Zavier Lucero (31)	Zavier Lucero (9)	Mark Barroca (7)	Ynares Center Antipolo	5–3
9	December 7, 2025	NLEX	W 98–82	Zavier Lucero (18)	Zavier Lucero (12)	Paul Lee (8)	Ynares Center Montalban	6–3
10	December 15, 2025	Rain or Shine	L 92–101	Mark Barroca (14)	Zavier Lucero (10)	Mark Barroca (5)	Khalifa Sports City Arena	6–4
11	December 21, 2025	TNT	L 83–94	Zavier Lucero (17)	Ian Sangalang (11)	Mark Barroca (5)	Smart Araneta Coliseum	6–5

=== Playoffs ===
==== Bracket ====
Quarterfinals (Top 4 twice-to-beat)
1	San Miguel	101
8	NLEX	94
4	Converge	85	98
5	Barangay Ginebra	105	99*
2	Rain or Shine	79	89
7	Meralco	96	98
3	TNT	118
6	Magnolia	109

Semifinals (Best-of-7)
1	San Miguel	4
5	Barangay Ginebra	2
7	Meralco	1
3	TNT	4

Finals (Best-of-7)
1	San Miguel	4
3	TNT	2

*Game went into overtime

==== Game log ====
2025–26 PBA Philippine Cup playoffs game log
Total: 0–1
Quarterfinals: 0–1

Game	Date	Opponent	Score	High points	High rebounds	High assists	Location Attendance	Series
1	December 27, 2025	TNT	L 109–118	Zavier Lucero (22)	Zavier Lucero (13)	Mark Barroca (13)	Smart Araneta Coliseum	0–1

== Commissioner's Cup ==
=== Eliminations ===
==== Standings ====
Pos	Team	W	L	PCT	GB	Qualification
1	NLEX Road Warriors	10	2	.833	—	Twice-to-beat in the quarterfinals
2	Barangay Ginebra San Miguel	9	3	.750 (Note: Head-to-head record: Barangay Ginebra 1–0 Rain or Shine)	1	Twice-to-beat in the quarterfinals
3	Rain or Shine Elasto Painters	9	3	.750	1	Twice-to-beat in the quarterfinals
4	Meralco Bolts	8	4	.667	2	Twice-to-beat in the quarterfinals
5	Magnolia Chicken Timplados Hotshots	7	5	.583 (Note: Head-to-head record: Magnolia 1–0 San Miguel)	3	Twice-to-win in the quarterfinals
6	San Miguel Beermen	7	5	.583	3	Twice-to-win in the quarterfinals
7	Phoenix Super LPG Fuel Masters	6	6	.500 (Note: Head-to-head record: Phoenix Super LPG 1–0 TNT)	4	Twice-to-win in the quarterfinals
8	TNT Tropang 5G	6	6	.500	4	Twice-to-win in the quarterfinals
9	Converge FiberXers	5	7	.417	5	
10	Terrafirma Dyip	4	8	.333	6	
11	Macau Black Knights (G)	3	9	.250	7	
12	Titan Ultra Giant Risers	2	10	.167 (Note: Head-to-head record: Titan Ultra 1–0 Blackwater)	8	
13	Blackwater Bossing	2	10	.167	8	

Source: PBA.ph
Rules for classification: 1) winning percentage; 2) head-to-head goal average (quotient); 3) head-to-head record; 4) overall quotient; 5) coin toss
(G) Guests

==== Game log ====
2026 PBA Commissioner's Cup game log
Total: 7–5
March: 1–3

Game	Date	Opponent	Score	High points	High rebounds	High assists	Location Attendance	Record
1	March 13, 2026	Phoenix Super LPG	L 98–101	Nuni Omot (27)	Jerom Lastimosa (9)	Jerom Lastimosa (4)	Ninoy Aquino Stadium	0–1
2	March 15, 2026	NLEX	L 105–112	Nuni Omot (32)	Zavier Lucero (11)	Nuni Omot (6)	Ynares Center Montalban	0–2
3	March 22, 2026	Blackwater	L 91–97	Nuni Omot (38)	Nuni Omot (7)	Nuni Omot (9)	Ynares Center Antipolo	0–3
4	March 28, 2026	Macau	W 121–109	Clint Chapman (39)	Clint Chapman (15)	Mark Barroca (7)	Smart Araneta Coliseum	1–3

April: 4–2

Game	Date	Opponent	Score	High points	High rebounds	High assists	Location Attendance	Record
5	April 7, 2026	Terrafirma	W 85–70	Clint Chapman (28)	Clint Chapman (11)	Mark Barroca (9)	Ninoy Aquino Stadium	2–3
6	April 10, 2026	Barangay Ginebra	L 89–91	Zavier Lucero (19)	Clint Chapman (10)	Barroca, Lee (6)	SM Mall of Asia Arena	2–4
7	April 12, 2026	San Miguel	W 120–101	Clint Chapman (34)	Zavier Lucero (7)	Mark Barroca (9)	Smart Araneta Coliseum	3–4
8	April 19, 2026	Converge	W 106–94	Clint Chapman (34)	Chapman, Lucero (14)	Mark Barroca (7)	Ynares Center Antipolo	4–4
9	April 24, 2026	Rain or Shine	L 82–91	Clint Chapman (17)	Clint Chapman (11)	Barroca, Lastimosa (6)	Ninoy Aquino Stadium	4–5
10	April 29, 2026	Titan Ultra	W 135–98	Clint Chapman (31)	Mark Barroca (11)	Mark Barroca (7)	Ninoy Aquino Stadium	5–5

May: 2–0

Game	Date	Opponent	Score	High points	High rebounds	High assists	Location Attendance	Record
11	May 5, 2026	TNT	W 106–94	Clint Chapman (42)	Clint Chapman (14)	Mark Barroca (12)	Ninoy Aquino Stadium	6–5
12	May 10, 2026	Meralco	W 93–76	Clint Chapman (19)	Zavier Lucero (10)	Peter Alfaro (4)	SM Mall of Asia Arena; 13,967	7–5

=== Playoffs ===
==== Bracket ====
Quarterfinals (Top 4 twice-to-beat)
1	NLEX	93	112
8	TNT	96	118
4	Meralco	89	105
5	Magnolia	95	102*
2	Barangay Ginebra	112
7	Phoenix Super LPG	81
3	Rain or Shine	113
6	San Miguel	104

Semifinals (Best-of-7)
8	TNT	4
4	Meralco	2
2	Barangay Ginebra	4
3	Rain or Shine	2

Finals (Best-of-7)
8	TNT	3
2	Barangay Ginebra	4

*Game went into overtime

==== Game log ====
2026 PBA Commissioner's Cup playoffs game log
Total: 1–1
Quarterfinals: 1–1

Game	Date	Opponent	Score	High points	High rebounds	High assists	Location Attendance	Series
1	May 13, 2026	Meralco	W 95–89	Clint Chapman (21)	Clint Chapman (12)	Barroca, Lee (5)	Ninoy Aquino Stadium	1–0
2	May 16, 2026	Meralco	L 102–105 (OT)	Jerom Lastimosa (28)	Zavier Lucero (5)	Mark Barroca (5)	Ynares Center Antipolo	1–1

== Governors' Cup ==
=== Eliminations ===
==== Standings ====
Pos	Team	W	L	PCT	GB	Qualification
1	Magnolia Chicken Timplados Hotshots	7	3	.700	—	Quarterfinals
2	Rain or Shine Elasto Painters	6	4	.600	1	Quarterfinals
3	Barangay Ginebra San Miguel	5	5	.500 (Note: Head-to-head quotient: Barangay Ginebra 1.08, Phoenix Super LPG 0.92)	2	Quarterfinals
4	Phoenix Super LPG Fuel Masters	5	5	.500	2	Quarterfinals
5	Meralco Bolts	4	6	.400	3	
6	Blackwater Bossing	3	7	.300	4	

Source: PBA.ph
Rules for classification: 1) winning percentage; 2) head-to-head quotient (goal average); 3) head-to-head record; 4) coin toss

==== Game log ====
2026 PBA Governors' Cup game log
Total: 7–3
July: 1–3

Game	Date	Opponent	Score	High points	High rebounds	High assists	Location Attendance	Record
1	July 11, 2026	Phoenix Super LPG	L 86–98	Zavier Lucero (20)	KJ Buffen (12)	Jerom Lastimosa (7)	Ynares Center Montalban	0–1
2	July 17, 2026	Blackwater	L 81–89	KJ Buffen (32)	KJ Buffen (11)	Barroca, Lastimosa (4)	Ninoy Aquino Stadium	0–2
3	July 24, 2026	Meralco	W 112–98	KJ Buffen (26)	KJ Buffen (11)	Buffen, Lastimosa (5)	Smart Araneta Coliseum	1–2
4	July 31, 2026	Rain or Shine	L 97–98	KJ Buffen (31)	KJ Buffen (17)	Mark Barroca (8)	SM Mall of Asia Arena	1–3

August: 3–0

Game	Date	Opponent	Score	High points	High rebounds	High assists	Location Attendance	Record
5	August 2, 2026	Barangay Ginebra	W 88–73	Zavier Lucero (24)	KJ Buffen (11)	Paul Lee (7)	Smart Araneta Coliseum	2–3
6	August 7, 2026	Meralco	W 105–88	KJ Buffen (27)	Ian Sangalang (10)	Jerom Lastimosa (6)	Ninoy Aquino Stadium	3–3
7	August 12, 2026	Phoenix Super LPG	W 115–101	KJ Buffen (35)	Buffen, Lucero (10)	Mark Barroca (4)	Ynares Center Antipolo	4–3

October: 3–0

Game	Date	Opponent	Score	High points	High rebounds	High assists	Location Attendance	Record
8	October 9, 2026	Blackwater	W 107–101	Buffen, Lastimosa (24)	KJ Buffen (20)	Jerom Lastimosa (7)	Ninoy Aquino Stadium	5–3
9	October 11, 2026	Barangay Ginebra	W 112–93	Zavier Lucero (21)	KJ Buffen (10)	Jerom Lastimosa (7)	Smart Araneta Coliseum	6–3
10	October 21, 2026	Rain or Shine	W 107–103	Javi Gómez de Liaño (19)	Ian Sangalang (8)	Jerom Lastimosa (4)	Ynares Center Antipolo	7–3

=== Playoffs ===
==== Bracket ====
Quarterfinals (Best-of-5)
A1	NLEX	3
B4	Phoenix Super LPG	0
B2	Rain or Shine	1
A3	Converge	1
B1	Magnolia	0
A4	TNT	3
A2	San Miguel	0
B3	Barangay Ginebra	2

Semifinals (Best-of-5)
NLEX	0
TNT	0

Finals (Best-of-7)

==== Game log ====
2026 PBA Governors' Cup playoffs game log
Total: 0–3
Quarterfinals: 0–3

Game	Date	Opponent	Score	High points	High rebounds	High assists	Location Attendance	Series
1	October 25, 2026	TNT	L 70–92	KJ Buffen (18)	Zavier Lucero (10)	Koon, Lastimosa (2)	Ynares Center Antipolo	0–1
2	October 28, 2026	TNT	L 73–91	KJ Buffen (24)	KJ Buffen (13)	Mark Barroca (4)	Ynares Center Antipolo	0–2
3	October 31, 2026	TNT	L 87–98	KJ Buffen (31)	Zavier Lucero (12)	Gab Gomez (6)	Ninoy Aquino Stadium	0–3

== Transactions ==
=== Free agency ===
==== Signings ====
Player	Date signed	Contract amount	Contract length	Former team	Ref.
Peter Alfaro	August 12, 2025	Not disclosed	3 years	Re-signed	
Joseph Eriobu	August 14, 2025	Not disclosed	1 year	Re-signed	
Russel Escoto	August 14, 2025	Not disclosed	2 years	Re-signed	
Paolo Taha	August 15, 2025	Not disclosed	2 years	NorthPort Batang Pier	
Javi Gómez de Liaño	August 30, 2025	Not disclosed	3 years	Anyang Jung Kwan Jang Red Boosters (KBL)	
Zavier Lucero	September 13, 2025	₱420,000 per month (max. contract)	2 years	Re-signed	
Raffy Verano	October 2, 2025	Not disclosed	Not disclosed	Phoenix Fuel Masters	
Clifford Jopia	June 30, 2026	Not disclosed	1 year	Blackwater Bossing	

==== Subtractions ====
Player	Number	Position	Reason	New team	Ref.
William Navarro	6	Power forward	Going overseas	Busan KCC Egis (KBL)	
Rafi Reavis	4	Center / Power forward	Released	Converge FiberXers	
Jed Mendoza	65	Shooting guard	Released	Blackwater Bossing	

=== Trades ===
==== Pre-season ====
August 2025
August 22, 2025	To Magnolia Javi Gómez de Liaño	To Terrafirma Jerrick Ahanmisi; 2025 Magnolia second-round pick (No. 18)

==== Philippine Cup ====
October 2025
October 28, 2025	To Magnolia Chris Koon	To Titan Ultra Aris Dionisio
December 2025
December 10, 2025	To Magnolia 2028 (S52) Terrafirma second-round pick	To Terrafirma Joseph Eriobu

==== Commissioner's Cup ====
June 2026
June 15, 2026	To Magnolia Rights of Arvin Tolentino 2027 (S51) Titan Ultra second-round pick (Note: Magnolia regained its own pick that they formerly traded.)	To Titan Ultra Rights of William Navarro 2028 (S52) Magnolia second-round pick

=== Recruited imports ===
Tournament	Name	Debuted	Last game	Record	Ref.
Commissioner's Cup	Nuni Omot	March 13, 2026 (vs. Phoenix Super LPG)	March 22, 2026 (vs. Blackwater)	0–3	
Commissioner's Cup	Clint Chapman	March 28, 2026 (vs. Macau)	May 16, 2026 (vs. Meralco)	8–3	
Governors' Cup	KJ Buffen	July 11, 2026 (vs. Phoenix Super LPG)	October 31, 2026 (vs. TNT)	7–6	
