= 2025–26 Terrafirma Dyip season =

- Head coach: Ronald Tubid
- General manager: Waiyip Chong
- Governor: Pido Jarencio
- Owner: Terrafirma Realty Development Corporation

Philippine Cup results
- Record: 1–10 (9.1%)
- Place: 12th
- Playoff finish: Did not qualify

Commissioner's Cup results
- Record: 4–8 (33.3%)
- Place: 10th
- Playoff finish: Did not qualify

Governors' Cup results
- Record: 5–7 (41.7%)
- Place: 5th in group A
- Playoff finish: Did not qualify

Terrafirma Dyip seasons

The 2025–26 Terrafirma Dyip season was the 11th season of the franchise in the Philippine Basketball Association (PBA).

== Key dates ==
- July 18, 2025: The franchise sale of the Terrafirma Dyip was dropped after the team and the organization behind the Zamboanga Valientes mutually agreed to no longer push through with the acquisition. Despite the failed sale, it was announced that Terrafirma will continue competing through this season.
- September 7, 2025: The PBA season 50 draft was held at the SM Mall of Asia Music Hall in Pasay.

== Draft picks ==
Round	Pick	Player	Position	Place of birth	College
1	1	Geo Chiu	C	Philippines	Ateneo
2	18	Shawn Umali	C/PF	Philippines	Benilde
3	25	Orin Catacutan	SG/SF	Philippines	UE
4	36	Dolan Adlawan	PF	Philippines	USC
5	47	Royce Alforque	PG	Philippines	FEU
6	56	JM Bravo	SF/PF	Philippines	Lyceum
7	62	Ira Bataller	PF	Philippines	Letran
8	67	Claude Camit	PG/SG	Philippines	UB
9	71	Tristan Medina	SG	Philippines	PCC
10	74	Franz Diaz	PG	Philippines	CEU

== Roster ==
Terrafirma Dyip roster
Players
Coaches

Pos.	#	POB	Name	Height	Weight	DOB (YYYY–MM–DD)	From
F	0	(Philippines)	Ira Bataller (FA)	6 ft 4 in (1.93 m)		2000–11–19	Letran
G	3	(Philippines)	Juami Tiongson	5 ft 10 in (1.78 m)	175 lb (79 kg)	1991–02–05	Ateneo
G	4	(United States)	Paul Garcia	5 ft 11 in (1.80 m)	170 lb (77 kg)	1999–06–04	Ateneo
C	5	(Philippines)	Keith Zaldivar	6 ft 6 in (1.98 m)		1996–05–25	Adamson
F/C	6	(Philippines)	Louie Sangalang	6 ft 4 in (1.93 m)	198 lb (90 kg)	1998–03–03	Letran
G	8	(United States)	Chris Miller	6 ft 2 in (1.88 m)	180 lb (82 kg)	1993–08–31	Salem
F	9	(Philippines)	CJ Catapusan	6 ft 3 in (1.91 m)		1997–01–29	Philippines
F	10	(Philippines)	Aljon Mariano	6 ft 3 in (1.91 m)	175 lb (79 kg)	1992–08–03	UST
C	11	(Philippines)	Ben Adamos	6 ft 7 in (2.01 m)	200 lb (91 kg)	1995–12–30	UPHSD
G	13	(United States)	Maverick Ahanmisi (FA)	6 ft 2 in (1.88 m)	190 lb (86 kg)	1991–07–17	Minnesota
C	18	(Philippines)	Geo Chiu	6 ft 10 in (2.08 m)	249 lb (113 kg)	2001–05–18	Ateneo
F	23	(British Hong Kong)	Joseph Eriobu	6 ft 4 in (1.93 m)	198 lb (90 kg)	1992–02–12	Mapúa
G	24	(Philippines)	Mark Nonoy	5 ft 9 in (1.75 m)		2000–07–24	De La Salle
F	26	(Philippines)	JM Bravo	6 ft 4 in (1.93 m)		2000–01–03	Lyceum
F/C	28	(Philippines)	Shawn Umali	6 ft 4 in (1.93 m)	242 lb (110 kg)	2000–12–02	St. Benilde
G/F	30	(Philippines)	Didat Hanapi	6 ft 2 in (1.88 m)		2001–07–31	Adamson
G	38	(Philippines)	Brent Paraiso	6 ft 1 in (1.85 m)	190 lb (86 kg)	1998–02–26	Letran

Head coach

- (Philippines) Ronald Tubid

Assistant coach(es)

- (Philippines) Jeff Napa (1st assistant)
- (Philippines) Alfredo Jarencio II
- (Philippines) Jun Vilarin

Team manager

- (Philippines) Waiyip Chong

Legend

- (C) Team captain
- (CI) Commissioner's Cup Import
- (GI) Governors' Cup Import
- (EI) EASL Import
- (DP) Unsigned draft pick
- (FA) Free agent
- (IN) Inactive
- (S) Suspended
- (R) Rookie
- Injured

Roster

== Philippine Cup ==
=== Eliminations ===
==== Standings ====
Pos	Team	W	L	PCT	GB	Qualification
1	San Miguel Beermen	9	2	.818	—	Twice-to-beat in the quarterfinals
2	Rain or Shine Elasto Painters	8	3	.727 (Note: Head-to-head record: Rain or Shine 1–0 TNT)	1	Twice-to-beat in the quarterfinals
3	TNT Tropang 5G	8	3	.727	1	Twice-to-beat in the quarterfinals
4	Converge FiberXers	7	4	.636 (Note: Head-to-head record: Converge 1–0 Barangay Ginebra)	2	Twice-to-beat in the quarterfinals
5	Barangay Ginebra San Miguel	7	4	.636	2	Twice-to-win in the quarterfinals
6	Magnolia Chicken Timplados Hotshots	6	5	.545 (Note: Head-to-head quotient: Magnolia 1.09, Meralco 0.99, NLEX 0.93)	3	Twice-to-win in the quarterfinals
7	Meralco Bolts	6	5	.545	3	Twice-to-win in the quarterfinals
8	NLEX Road Warriors	6	5	.545	3	Twice-to-win in the quarterfinals
9	Titan Ultra Giant Risers	4	7	.364	5	
10	Phoenix Fuel Masters	3	8	.273	6	
11	Blackwater Bossing	1	10	.091 (Note: Head-to-head record: Blackwater 1–0 Terrafirma)	8	
12	Terrafirma Dyip	1	10	.091	8	

Source: PBA.ph
Rules for classification: 1) winning percentage; 2) head-to-head goal average (quotient); 3) head-to-head record; 4) overall quotient; 5) coin toss

==== Game log ====
2025–26 PBA Philippine Cup game log
Total: 1–10
October: 1–4

Game	Date	Opponent	Score	High points	High rebounds	High assists	Location Attendance	Record
1	October 10, 2025	Blackwater	L 87–107	Jerrick Ahanmisi (25)	JM Bravo (9)	Mark Nonoy (5)	Ynares Center Montalban	0–1
2	October 12, 2025	NLEX	W 97–91	JM Bravo (18)	JM Bravo (8)	Mark Nonoy (13)	Ynares Center Antipolo	1–1
3	October 22, 2025	Converge	L 108–125	Jerrick Ahanmisi (16)	JM Bravo (6)	Brent Paraiso (5)	Ninoy Aquino Stadium	1–2
4	October 25, 2025	Magnolia	L 93–104	Bravo, Hernandez (16)	Paolo Hernandez (10)	J. Ahanmisi, Hernandez (3)	Ynares Center Antipolo	1–3
5	October 31, 2025	Rain or Shine	L 91–106	Jerrick Ahanmisi (25)	JM Bravo (15)	Brent Paraiso (7)	Ynares Center Antipolo	1–4

November: 0–2

Game	Date	Opponent	Score	High points	High rebounds	High assists	Location Attendance	Record
6	November 7, 2025	TNT	L 95–109 (OT)	Jerrick Ahanmisi (26)	J. Ahanmisi, Paraiso (8)	Brent Paraiso (11)	Ynares Center Montalban	1–5
7	November 12, 2025	Phoenix	L 76–107	Paolo Hernandez (14)	J. Ahanmisi, Bravo, Mariano (6)	Brent Paraiso (4)	Ynares Center Montalban	1–6

December: 0–4

Game	Date	Opponent	Score	High points	High rebounds	High assists	Location Attendance	Record
8	December 6, 2025	Titan Ultra	L 108–111	Jerrick Ahanmisi (20)	Aljon Mariano (10)	Maverick Ahanmisi (6)	Ynares Center Antipolo	1–7
9	December 10, 2025	Meralco	L 87–120	Mark Nonoy (22)	JM Bravo (7)	Mark Nonoy (4)	Ynares Center Antipolo	1–8
10	December 12, 2025	Barangay Ginebra	L 77–108	Paolo Hernandez (15)	JM Bravo (10)	Mark Nonoy (4)	Ninoy Aquino Stadium	1–9
11	December 17, 2025	San Miguel	L 115–135	Maverick Ahanmisi (20)	JM Bravo (6)	Mark Nonoy (9)	Ninoy Aquino Stadium	1–10

== Commissioner's Cup ==
=== Eliminations ===
==== Standings ====
Pos	Team	W	L	PCT	GB	Qualification
1	NLEX Road Warriors	10	2	.833	—	Twice-to-beat in the quarterfinals
2	Barangay Ginebra San Miguel	9	3	.750 (Note: Head-to-head record: Barangay Ginebra 1–0 Rain or Shine)	1	Twice-to-beat in the quarterfinals
3	Rain or Shine Elasto Painters	9	3	.750	1	Twice-to-beat in the quarterfinals
4	Meralco Bolts	8	4	.667	2	Twice-to-beat in the quarterfinals
5	Magnolia Chicken Timplados Hotshots	7	5	.583 (Note: Head-to-head record: Magnolia 1–0 San Miguel)	3	Twice-to-win in the quarterfinals
6	San Miguel Beermen	7	5	.583	3	Twice-to-win in the quarterfinals
7	Phoenix Super LPG Fuel Masters	6	6	.500 (Note: Head-to-head record: Phoenix Super LPG 1–0 TNT)	4	Twice-to-win in the quarterfinals
8	TNT Tropang 5G	6	6	.500	4	Twice-to-win in the quarterfinals
9	Converge FiberXers	5	7	.417	5	
10	Terrafirma Dyip	4	8	.333	6	
11	Macau Black Knights	3	9	.250	7	
12	Titan Ultra Giant Risers	2	10	.167 (Note: Head-to-head record: Titan Ultra 1–0 Blackwater)	8	
13	Blackwater Bossing	2	10	.167	8	

Source: PBA.ph
Rules for classification: 1) winning percentage; 2) head-to-head goal average (quotient); 3) head-to-head record; 4) overall quotient; 5) coin toss

==== Game log ====
2026 PBA Commissioner's Cup game log
Total: 4–8
March: 3–1

Game	Date	Opponent	Score	High points	High rebounds	High assists	Location Attendance	Record
1	March 11, 2026	Titan Ultra	W 112–82	Mubashar Ali (27)	Geo Chiu (14)	Maverick Ahanmisi (10)	Ninoy Aquino Stadium	1–0
2	March 14, 2026	Converge	W 111–100 (OT)	Mubashar Ali (50)	Mubashar Ali (25)	Maverick Ahanmisi (7)	Ynares Center Montalban	2–0
3	March 18, 2026	Blackwater	W 99–88	Mubashar Ali (22)	Mubashar Ali (23)	Maverick Ahanmisi (5)	Ynares Center Antipolo	3–0
4	March 25, 2026	Phoenix Super LPG	L 105–133	Jerrick Ahanmisi (37)	Mubashar Ali (17)	Maverick Ahanmisi (6)	Ynares Center Antipolo	3–1

April: 0–5

Game	Date	Opponent	Score	High points	High rebounds	High assists	Location Attendance	Record
5	April 7, 2026	Magnolia	L 70–85	Jerrick Ahanmisi (21)	Mubashar Ali (18)	J. Ahanmisi, M. Ahanmisi, Paraiso (4)	Ninoy Aquino Stadium	3–2
6	April 11, 2026	TNT	L 89–101	Mubashar Ali (24)	Mubashar Ali (17)	Jerrick Ahanmisi (6)	Ninoy Aquino Stadium	3–3
7	April 15, 2026	Rain or Shine	L 117–124	Mubashar Ali (32)	Mubashar Ali (19)	Jerrick Ahanmisi (7)	Ynares Center Antipolo	3–4
8	April 18, 2026	Barangay Ginebra	L 103–111	Jerrick Ahanmisi (27)	Mubashar Ali (10)	Brent Paraiso (4)	Ynares Center Montalban	3–5
9	April 25, 2026	NLEX	L 85–95	Maverick Ahanmisi (22)	Geo Chiu (15)	Maverick Ahanmisi (6)	Ninoy Aquino Stadium	3–6

May: 1–2

Game	Date	Opponent	Score	High points	High rebounds	High assists	Location Attendance	Record
10	May 2, 2026	Macau	W 102–84	Jerrick Ahanmisi (29)	Mubashar Ali (16)	Jerrick Ahanmisi (8)	Ninoy Aquino Stadium	4–6
11	May 6, 2026	San Miguel	L 110–126	Mubashar Ali (28)	Geo Chiu (16)	Paolo Hernandez (8)	Ninoy Aquino Stadium	4–7
12	May 8, 2026	Meralco	L 69–113	Paolo Hernandez (15)	Geo Chiu (12)	Jerrick Ahanmisi (4)	Ninoy Aquino Stadium	4–8

== Governors' Cup ==
=== Eliminations ===
==== Standings ====
Pos	Team	W	L	PCT	GB	Qualification
1	q – NLEX Road Warriors	9	2	.818	—	Quarterfinals
2	q – San Miguel Beermen	8	3	.727	1	Quarterfinals
3	q – Converge FiberXers	8	4	.667	1.5	Quarterfinals
4	q – TNT Tropang 5G	7	5	.583	2.5	Quarterfinals
5	e – Terrafirma Dyip	5	7	.417	4.5	
6	e – Macau Giant Pandas	2	10	.167 (Note: Head-to-head quotient: Macau 1.01, Titan Ultra 0.99)	7.5	
7	e – Titan Ultra Giant Risers	2	10	.167	7.5	

Updated to match(es) played on October 18, 2026. Source: PBA.ph
Rules for classification: 1) winning percentage; 2) if two teams are tied, head-to-head record, if three or more teams are tied, head-to-head goal average (quotient); 3) overall quotient; 4) coin toss
e – Eliminated; q – Qualified for the phase indicated

==== Game log ====
2026 PBA Governors' Cup game log
Total: 5–7
July: 2–4

Game	Date	Opponent	Score	High points	High rebounds	High assists	Location Attendance	Record
1	July 10, 2026	Titan Ultra	W 113–100	Justin Strings (25)	Geo Chiu (23)	Ahanmisi, Strings (6)	Ynares Center Antipolo	1–0
2	July 12, 2026	NLEX	L 100–101	Ahanmisi, Tiongson (19)	Geo Chiu (15)	Ahanmisi, Strings (6)	Ynares Center Montalban	1–1
3	July 15, 2026	Converge	L 103–105	Justin Strings (40)	Justin Strings (11)	Maverick Ahanmisi (12)	Smart Araneta Coliseum	1–2
4	July 18, 2026	San Miguel	L 104–109	Justin Strings (28)	Justin Strings (12)	Juami Tiongson (7)	Ynares Center Antipolo	1–3
5	July 25, 2026	TNT	W 111–106 (OT)	Justin Strings (36)	Justin Strings (12)	Ahanmisi, Strings (6)	Ynares Center Antipolo	2–3
6	July 29, 2026	Macau	L 92–96	Justin Strings (34)	Geo Chiu (12)	Maverick Ahanmisi (8)	Ninoy Aquino Stadium	2–4

August: 1–1

Game	Date	Opponent	Score	High points	High rebounds	High assists	Location Attendance	Record
7	August 7, 2026	NLEX	W 114–109	Justin Strings (28)	Geo Chiu (12)	Maverick Ahanmisi (10)	Ninoy Aquino Stadium	3–4
8	August 11, 2026	Converge	L 103–120	Justin Strings (28)	Geo Chiu, Strings (11)	Maverick Ahanmisi (7)	Ynares Center Antipolo	3–5

October: 2–1

Game	Date	Opponent	Score	High points	High rebounds	High assists	Location Attendance	Record
9	October 7, 2026	TNT	L 92–116	Ahanmisi, Strings (27)	Justin Strings (11)	Maverick Ahanmisi (4)	Ninoy Aquino Stadium	3–6
10	October 10, 2026	Macau	W 146–127	Justin Strings (32)	Geo Chiu (20)	Maverick Ahanmisi (14)	Ynares Center Antipolo	4–6
11	October 14, 2026	San Miguel	L 105–135	Justin Strings (28)	Justin Strings (9)	Maverick Ahanmisi (9)	Ninoy Aquino Stadium	4–7
12	October 17, 2026	Titan Ultra	W 149–117	Juami Tiongson (30)	Ahanmisi, Strings (10)	Maverick Ahanmisi (14)	Ynares Center Antipolo	5–7

== Transactions ==
=== Signings ===
Player	Date signed	Contract amount	Contract length	Former team	Ref.
Kemark Cariño	September 18, 2025	Not disclosed	Not disclosed	Re-signed	
Brent Paraiso	September 18, 2025	Not disclosed	Not disclosed	Re-signed	
Paul Garcia	September 18, 2025	Not disclosed	Not disclosed	Barangay Ginebra San Miguel	
Prince Rivero	September 18, 2025	Not disclosed	Not disclosed	Rain or Shine Elasto Painters	
Didat Hanapi	September 24, 2025	Not disclosed	1 year	Re-signed	
Paolo Hernandez	September 24, 2025	Not disclosed	1 year	Re-signed	
Keith Zaldivar	September 24, 2025	Not disclosed	1 year	Re-signed	
Jerrick Ahanmisi	October 2, 2025	Not disclosed	1 year	Re-signed	

=== Subtractions ===
Player	Number	Position	Reason	New team	Ref.
Aldrech Ramos	17	Power forward / Center	Going to other leagues	San Juan Knights (MPBL)	
Stanley Pringle	11	Shooting guard	Free agent	Rain or Shine Elasto Painters	
Kevin Ferrer	7, 14, 13	Small forward / Power forward	Free agent	TNT Tropang 5G	
Aljun Melecio	15	Point guard	Released	NorthPort Batang Pier / Titan Ultra Giant Risers	
Terrence Romeo	7	Point guard / Shooting guard	Contract not renewed		

=== Trades ===
==== Pre-season ====
August 2025
August 22, 2025	To Terrafirma Jerrick Ahanmisi; 2025 Magnolia second-round pick (No. 18)	To Magnolia Javi Gómez de Liaño

==== Philippine Cup ====
October 2025
October 15, 2025	To Terrafirma Maverick Ahanmisi; Aljon Mariano	To Barangay Ginebra 2027 (S51) Terrafirma first-round pick
December 2025
December 10, 2025	To Terrafirma Joseph Eriobu	To Magnolia 2028 (S52) Terrafirma second-round pick

==== Mid-season ====
February 2026
February 27, 2026	To Terrafirma Ben Adamos	To Barangay Ginebra Kemark Cariño

==== Commissioner's Cup ====
June 2026
June 3, 2026	To Terrafirma Chris Miller; Juami Tiongson; 2028 (S52) San Miguel first-round pick	To San Miguel Jerrick Ahanmisi; Paolo Hernandez

=== Recruited imports ===
Tournament	Name	Debuted	Last game	Record	Ref.
Commissioner's Cup	Mubashar Ali	March 11, 2026 (vs. Titan Ultra)	May 6, 2026 (vs. San Miguel)	4–7	
Governors' Cup	Justin Strings	July 10, 2026 (vs. Titan Ultra)	October 17, 2026 (vs. Titan Ultra)	5–7	
