= 2025–26 Titan Ultra Giant Risers season =

- Head coach: Johnedel Cardel (Philippine Cup); Rensy Bajar
- General manager: Aldriane Anglim (Philippine Cup); Danilo Martinez (Commissioner's Cup); Jessica Arsolon
- Governor: Emilio Tiu
- Owner: Pureblends Corporation

Philippine Cup results
- Record: 4–7 (36.4%)
- Place: 9th
- Playoff finish: Did not qualify

Commissioner's Cup results
- Record: 2–10 (16.7%)
- Place: 12th
- Playoff finish: Did not qualify

Governors' Cup results
- Record: 2–10 (16.7%)
- Place: 7th in group A
- Playoff finish: Did not qualify

Titan Ultra Giant Risers seasons

The 2025–26 Titan Ultra Giant Risers season was the first season of the franchise in the Philippine Basketball Association (PBA). On October 1, 2025, the franchise was established through Pureblends Corporation's acquisition of the NorthPort Batang Pier. Ahead of the acquisition, Johnedel Cardel was named as the team's first head coach on September 20.

The team played their first game as a franchise on October 8 against the Meralco Bolts, where they also got their first win in franchise history.

== Draft picks ==
Titan Ultra Giant Risers took part in the draft as the NorthPort Batang Pier.

== Roster ==
Titan Ultra Giant Risers roster
Players
Coaches

Pos.	#	POB	Name	Height	Weight	DOB (YYYY–MM–DD)	From
G	1	(Philippines)	RR Garcia	5 ft 11 in (1.80 m)	165 lb (75 kg)	1990–01–12	Far Eastern
G	3	(Philippines)	Fran Yu	5 ft 9 in (1.75 m)	154 lb (70 kg)	1998–06–16	Letran
G	4	(Philippines)	Bryan Sajonia (injured)	6 ft 0 in (1.83 m)		2000–07–04	San Beda
F	5	(Philippines)	Ato Ular	6 ft 4 in (1.93 m)	196 lb (89 kg)	1995–05–04	Letran
G	8	(Philippines)	Denzel Wong	5 ft 8 in (1.73 m)		1993–03–06	Asia Pacific
F/C	9	(Philippines)	Paolo Javillonar	6 ft 6 in (1.98 m)		2000–05–13	Letran
G	11	(Philippines)	Aljun Melecio	5 ft 8 in (1.73 m)	160 lb (73 kg)	1998–07–25	De La Salle
G	12	(Philippines)	Roi Sumang	5 ft 8 in (1.73 m)	160 lb (73 kg)	1990–12–12	UE
G	13	(Philippines)	John Amores	6 ft 2 in (1.88 m)	178 lb (81 kg)	1999–06–13	José Rizal
G/F	19	(Philippines)	Von Pessumal	6 ft 2 in (1.88 m)	185 lb (84 kg)	1993–02–12	Ateneo
F	21	(Philippines)	Aris Dionisio	6 ft 4 in (1.93 m)		1995–07–21	St. Clare
F	22	(Australia)	Cade Flores (injured)	6 ft 5 in (1.96 m)	214 lb (97 kg)	1998–09–29	Arellano
C	23	(Philippines)	Mark Omega (injured)	6 ft 5 in (1.96 m)		2000–08–26	Letran
G/F	24	(United States)	Joshua Munzon	6 ft 4 in (1.93 m)	200 lb (91 kg)	1995–01–15	Cal State LA
G	26	(Philippines)	Axel Iñigo	5 ft 9 in (1.75 m)		1994–04–22	Far Eastern
F	27	(Philippines)	King Caralipio	6 ft 2 in (1.88 m)	176 lb (80 kg)	1997–12–04	Letran
F	28	(Philippines)	Mark Sangco	6 ft 5 in (1.96 m)		1999–10–02	St. Benilde
C	–	(Philippines)	Mario Barasi	6 ft 8 in (2.03 m)		2000–08–09	Adamson
G	–	(Philippines)	James Martinez	5 ft 9 in (1.75 m)	170 lb (77 kg)	1987–01–31	UE

Head coach

- (Philippines) Raymond Valenzona

Assistant coach(es)

- (Philippines) Jerson Cabiltes (1st assistant)
- (Philippines) June Dizon
- (Philippines) Maverick Chua
- (Philippines) Mike Fermin
- (Philippines) Bonnie Tan (consultant)

Team manager

- (Philippines) Jessica Arsolon

Legend

- (C) Team captain
- (CI) Commissioner's Cup Import
- (GI) Governors' Cup Import
- (EI) EASL Import
- (DP) Unsigned draft pick
- (FA) Free agent
- (IN) Inactive
- (S) Suspended
- (R) Rookie
- Injured

Roster

== Philippine Cup ==
=== Eliminations ===
==== Standings ====
Pos	Team	W	L	PCT	GB	Qualification
1	San Miguel Beermen	9	2	.818	—	Twice-to-beat in the quarterfinals
2	Rain or Shine Elasto Painters	8	3	.727 (Note: Head-to-head record: Rain or Shine 1–0 TNT)	1	Twice-to-beat in the quarterfinals
3	TNT Tropang 5G	8	3	.727	1	Twice-to-beat in the quarterfinals
4	Converge FiberXers	7	4	.636 (Note: Head-to-head record: Converge 1–0 Barangay Ginebra)	2	Twice-to-beat in the quarterfinals
5	Barangay Ginebra San Miguel	7	4	.636	2	Twice-to-win in the quarterfinals
6	Magnolia Chicken Timplados Hotshots	6	5	.545 (Note: Head-to-head quotient: Magnolia 1.09, Meralco 0.99, NLEX 0.93)	3	Twice-to-win in the quarterfinals
7	Meralco Bolts	6	5	.545	3	Twice-to-win in the quarterfinals
8	NLEX Road Warriors	6	5	.545	3	Twice-to-win in the quarterfinals
9	Titan Ultra Giant Risers	4	7	.364	5	
10	Phoenix Fuel Masters	3	8	.273	6	
11	Blackwater Bossing	1	10	.091 (Note: Head-to-head record: Blackwater 1–0 Terrafirma)	8	
12	Terrafirma Dyip	1	10	.091	8	

Source: PBA.ph
Rules for classification: 1) winning percentage; 2) head-to-head goal average (quotient); 3) head-to-head record; 4) overall quotient; 5) coin toss

==== Game log ====
2025–26 PBA Philippine Cup game log
Total: 4–7
October: 1–4

Game	Date	Opponent	Score	High points	High rebounds	High assists	Location Attendance	Record
1	October 8, 2025	Meralco	W 100–96	Calvin Abueva (41)	Abueva, Ular (7)	Fran Yu (9)	Ynares Center Antipolo	1–0
2	October 11, 2025	Converge	L 92–129	Joshua Munzon (31)	Koon, Munzon (5)	Fran Yu (6)	Ynares Center Montalban	1–1
3	October 17, 2025	Magnolia	L 119–127	Joshua Munzon (28)	Jeo Ambohot (7)	Joshua Munzon (6)	Smart Araneta Coliseum	1–2
4	October 24, 2025	TNT	L 92–130	Joshua Munzon (20)	Calvin Abueva (11)	Fran Yu (7)	Ynares Center Antipolo	1–3
5	October 26, 2025	Rain or Shine	L 111–112	Calvin Abueva (31)	Calvin Abueva (18)	Joshua Munzon (8)	Ynares Center Antipolo	1–4

November: 1–2

Game	Date	Opponent	Score	High points	High rebounds	High assists	Location Attendance	Record
6	November 5, 2025	Blackwater	W 97–86	Calvin Abueva (23)	Calvin Abueva (14)	Fran Yu (7)	Ninoy Aquino Stadium	2–4
7	November 12, 2025	San Miguel	L 117–158	Von Pessumal (21)	Abueva, Dionisio (10)	Fran Yu (7)	Ynares Center Montalban	2–5
8	November 16, 2025	NLEX	L 83–92	Calvin Abueva (27)	Calvin Abueva (15)	Munzon, Yu (5)	Quadricentennial Pavilion	2–6

December: 2–1

Game	Date	Opponent	Score	High points	High rebounds	High assists	Location Attendance	Record
9	December 6, 2025	Terrafirma	W 111–108	Joshua Munzon (21)	Calvin Abueva (15)	Fran Yu (11)	Ynares Center Antipolo	3–6
10	December 14, 2025	Phoenix	W 127–119	Calvin Abueva (35)	Calvin Abueva (17)	Fran Yu (10)	Ynares Center Antipolo	4–6
11	December 21, 2025	Barangay Ginebra	L 105–108	Joshua Munzon (31)	Calvin Abueva (11)	Joshua Munzon (8)	Smart Araneta Coliseum	4–7

== Commissioner's Cup ==
=== Eliminations ===
==== Standings ====
Pos	Team	W	L	PCT	GB	Qualification
1	NLEX Road Warriors	10	2	.833	—	Twice-to-beat in the quarterfinals
2	Barangay Ginebra San Miguel	9	3	.750 (Note: Head-to-head record: Barangay Ginebra 1–0 Rain or Shine)	1	Twice-to-beat in the quarterfinals
3	Rain or Shine Elasto Painters	9	3	.750	1	Twice-to-beat in the quarterfinals
4	Meralco Bolts	8	4	.667	2	Twice-to-beat in the quarterfinals
5	Magnolia Chicken Timplados Hotshots	7	5	.583 (Note: Head-to-head record: Magnolia 1–0 San Miguel)	3	Twice-to-win in the quarterfinals
6	San Miguel Beermen	7	5	.583	3	Twice-to-win in the quarterfinals
7	Phoenix Super LPG Fuel Masters	6	6	.500 (Note: Head-to-head record: Phoenix Super LPG 1–0 TNT)	4	Twice-to-win in the quarterfinals
8	TNT Tropang 5G	6	6	.500	4	Twice-to-win in the quarterfinals
9	Converge FiberXers	5	7	.417	5	
10	Terrafirma Dyip	4	8	.333	6	
11	Macau Black Knights	3	9	.250	7	
12	Titan Ultra Giant Risers	2	10	.167 (Note: Head-to-head record: Titan Ultra 1–0 Blackwater)	8	
13	Blackwater Bossing	2	10	.167	8	

Source: PBA.ph
Rules for classification: 1) winning percentage; 2) head-to-head goal average (quotient); 3) head-to-head record; 4) overall quotient; 5) coin toss

==== Game log ====
2026 PBA Commissioner's Cup game log
Total: 2–10
March: 1–3

Game	Date	Opponent	Score	High points	High rebounds	High assists	Location Attendance	Record
1	March 11, 2026	Terrafirma	L 82–112	Michael Gilmore (33)	Michael Gilmore (13)	Fran Yu (4)	Ninoy Aquino Stadium	0–1
2	March 15, 2026	Phoenix Super LPG	L 76–109	Michael Gilmore (27)	Michael Gilmore (20)	Fran Yu (6)	Ynares Center Montalban	0–2
3	March 21, 2026	San Miguel	W 119–112	Joshua Munzon (29)	Michael Gilmore (13)	Fran Yu (10)	Ynares Center Antipolo	1–2
4	March 29, 2026	Meralco	L 105–118	Bryan Sajonia (29)	Michael Gilmore (16)	Munzon, Yu (4)	Smart Araneta Coliseum	1–3

April: 1–5

Game	Date	Opponent	Score	High points	High rebounds	High assists	Location Attendance	Record
5	April 8, 2026	Blackwater	W 102–98	Joshua Munzon (25)	Michael Gilmore (15)	Fran Yu (8)	Ninoy Aquino Stadium	2–3
6	April 15, 2026	Converge	L 82–103	Michael Gilmore (26)	Michael Gilmore (16)	Joshua Munzon (4)	Ynares Center Antipolo	2–4
7	April 18, 2026	TNT	L 92–97	Michael Gilmore (33)	Michael Gilmore (15)	Joshua Munzon (5)	Ynares Center Montalban	2–5
8	April 21, 2026	Macau	L 107–119	Fran Yu (35)	Cade Flores (10)	Fran Yu (5)	Ninoy Aquino Stadium	2–6
9	April 26, 2026	Barangay Ginebra	L 107–119	Joshua Munzon (20)	Michael Gilmore (10)	Joshua Munzon (10)	Smart Araneta Coliseum	2–7
10	April 29, 2026	Magnolia	L 98–135	Michael Gilmore (31)	Michael Gilmore (14)	Fran Yu (7)	Ninoy Aquino Stadium	2–8

May: 0–2

Game	Date	Opponent	Score	High points	High rebounds	High assists	Location Attendance	Record
11	May 5, 2026	NLEX	L 112–123 (OT)	Michael Gilmore (25)	Michael Gilmore (18)	Joshua Munzon (7)	Ninoy Aquino Stadium	2–9
12	May 8, 2026	Rain or Shine	L 131–142	Bryan Sajonia (23)	Michael Gilmore (10)	Fran Yu (7)	Ninoy Aquino Stadium	2–10

== Governors' Cup ==
=== Eliminations ===
==== Standings ====
Pos	Team	W	L	PCT	GB	Qualification
1	q – NLEX Road Warriors	9	2	.818	—	Quarterfinals
2	q – San Miguel Beermen	8	3	.727	1	Quarterfinals
3	q – Converge FiberXers	8	4	.667	1.5	Quarterfinals
4	q – TNT Tropang 5G	7	5	.583	2.5	Quarterfinals
5	e – Terrafirma Dyip	5	7	.417	4.5	
6	e – Macau Giant Pandas	2	10	.167 (Note: Head-to-head quotient: Macau 1.01, Titan Ultra 0.99)	7.5	
7	e – Titan Ultra Giant Risers	2	10	.167	7.5	

Updated to match(es) played on October 18, 2026. Source: PBA.ph
Rules for classification: 1) winning percentage; 2) if two teams are tied, head-to-head record, if three or more teams are tied, head-to-head goal average (quotient); 3) overall quotient; 4) coin toss
e – Eliminated; q – Qualified for the phase indicated

==== Game log ====
2026 PBA Governors' Cup game log
Total: 2–10
July: 1–5

Game	Date	Opponent	Score	High points	High rebounds	High assists	Location Attendance	Record
1	July 10, 2026	Terrafirma	L 100–113	Aris Dionisio (21)	Dionisio, Omega (9)	Fran Yu (8)	Ynares Center Antipolo	0–1
2	July 12, 2026	Converge	L 74–105	Sajonia, Yu (14)	Dionisio, Ular (8)	Fran Yu (5)	Ynares Center Montalban	0–2
3	July 14, 2026	NLEX	L 100–135	Tirrell Brown (27)	Tirrell Brown (7)	Fran Yu (8)	Ynares Center Antipolo	0–3
4	July 22, 2026	TNT	W 103–87	Tirrell Brown (29)	Tirrell Brown (10)	Fran Yu (11)	Ynares Center Antipolo	1–3
5	July 25, 2026	Macau	L 126–132	Tirrell Brown (30)	Tirrell Brown (14)	Fran Yu (14)	Ynares Center Antipolo	1–4
6	July 29, 2026	San Miguel	L 105–143	Joshua Munzon (25)	Tirrell Brown (7)	Munzon, Yu (5)	Ninoy Aquino Stadium	1–5

August: 1–2

Game	Date	Opponent	Score	High points	High rebounds	High assists	Location Attendance	Record
7	August 4, 2026	Macau	W 132–128	Tirrell Brown (36)	Tirrell Brown (10)	Tirrell Brown (7)	Ninoy Aquino Stadium	2–5
8	August 8, 2026	TNT	L 80–114	Tirrell Brown (14)	Tirrell Brown (11)	Joshua Munzon (5)	Ynares Center Montalban	2–6
9	August 12, 2026	San Miguel	L 113–143	Tirrell Brown (34)	Tirrell Brown (13)	Tirrell Brown (6)	Ynares Center Antipolo	2–7

October: 0–3

Game	Date	Opponent	Score	High points	High rebounds	High assists	Location Attendance	Record
10	October 11, 2026	Converge	L 119–152	Tirrell Brown (31)	Tirrell Brown (9)	Fran Yu (13)	Smart Araneta Coliseum	2–8
11	October 14, 2026	NLEX	L 115–147	Joshua Munzon (33)	Tirrell Brown (8)	Munzon, Yu (4)	Ninoy Aquino Stadium	2–9
12	October 17, 2026	Terrafirma	L 117–149	Von Pessumal (26)	Tirrell Brown (10)	Fran Yu (12)	Ynares Center Antipolo	2–10

== Transactions ==
=== Free agency ===
==== Signings ====
Player	Date signed	Contract amount	Contract length	Former team	Ref.
James Martinez	October 1, 2025	Not disclosed	Not disclosed	Ho Chi Minh City Wings (VBA)	
Arvie Bringas	October 4, 2025	Not disclosed	Not disclosed	Val City Magic (MPBL)	
Roi Sumang	October 4, 2025	Not disclosed	Not disclosed	Zamboanga Sikat (MPBL)	
Ato Ular	June 18, 2026	Not disclosed	2 years	Re-signed	
Axel Iñigo	June 26, 2026	Not disclosed	Not disclosed	Mindoro Tamaraws (MPBL)	
John Amores	July 9, 2026	Not disclosed	Rest of the season	NorthPort Batang Pier	
Denzel Wong	Not disclosed	Not disclosed	Not disclosed		
RR Garcia	September 8, 2026	Not disclosed	Rest of the season	Phoenix Fuel Masters	
Joshua Munzon	October 11, 2026	Not disclosed	3 years	Re-signed	

==== Subtractions ====
Player	Number	Position	Reason	New team	Ref.
CJ Austria (Note: CJ Austria signed a rookie contract with Titan Ultra last February 18, 2026 but he did not play any single game with the team because he was released by the team.)		Shooting guard / Small forward	Released	Blackwater Bossing	
Jeo Ambohot	18	Center / Power forward	Released	TNT Tropang 5G	
Jerrick Balanza	7	Shooting guard	Released		
Damie Cuntapay	10	Power forward / Center	Released		

=== Trades ===
==== Pre-season ====
October 2025
October 1, 2025	To Titan Ultra Ato Ular	To Phoenix James Kwekuteye

==== Philippine Cup ====
October 2025
October 24, 2025	To Titan Ultra Kobe Monje; 2027 (S51) Converge second-round pick 2028 (S52) Converge first-round pick	To Converge Rights of Dave Ildefonso
October 28, 2025	To Titan Ultra Aris Dionisio	To Magnolia Chris Koon
December 2025
December 10, 2025	To Titan Ultra Paolo Javillonar	To Converge 2027 (S51) Titan Ultra second-round pick

==== Mid-season ====
February 2026
February 3, 2026	To Titan Ultra King Caralipio; Mark Omega; Rey Suerte	To Converge Calvin Abueva

==== Commissioner's Cup ====
June 2026
June 15, 2026	To Titan Ultra Rights of William Navarro 2028 (S52) Magnolia second-round pick	To Magnolia Rights of Arvin Tolentino 2027 (S51) Titan Ultra second-round pick (Note: Titan Ultra traded back the original pick of Magnolia.)

=== Recruited imports ===
Tournament	Name	Debuted	Last game	Record	Ref.
Commissioner's Cup	Michael Gilmore	March 11, 2026 (vs. Terrafirma)	May 8, 2026 (vs. Rain or Shine)	2–10	
Governors' Cup	Tirrell Brown	July 14, 2026 (vs. NLEX)	October 17, 2026 (vs. Terrafirma)	2–8	
