= 2025–26 NLEX Road Warriors season =

- Head coach: Jong Uichico (Philippine & Commissioner's Cup); Jimmy Alapag
- General manager: Ronald Dulatre
- Governor: Ronald Dulatre
- Owners: Metro Pacific Investments Corporation (an MVP Group subsidiary)

Philippine Cup results
- Record: 6–5 (54.5%)
- Place: 8th
- Playoff finish: Quarterfinalist (lost to San Miguel with twice-to-win disadvantage)

Commissioner's Cup results
- Record: 10–2 (83.3%)
- Place: 1st
- Playoff finish: Quarterfinalist (lost to TNT with twice-to-beat advantage)

Governors' Cup results
- Record: 9–3 (75%)
- Place: 1st in group A
- Playoff finish: TBD

NLEX Road Warriors seasons

The 2025–26 NLEX Road Warriors season is the 11th season of the franchise in the Philippine Basketball Association (PBA).

== Key dates ==
- September 7, 2025: The PBA season 50 draft was held at the SM Mall of Asia Music Hall in Pasay.

== Draft picks ==
Round	Pick	Player	Position	Place of birth	College
1	5	Ljay Gonzales	PG	Philippines	FEU
2	17	Arvin Gamboa	SF/PF	Philippines	Mapúa
3	29	Lorenz Capulong	C	Philippines	Arellano
4	40	Judel Fuentes	SG	Philippines	CEU
5	51	Herrald Benedictos	SF/SG	Philippines	Bulacan State
6	59	Tutoy Ramirez	PG/SG	Philippines	ICC
7	65	AJ Madrigal	SG/SF	Philippines	UP
8	69	John Galinato	PG/SG	Philippines	NU

== Roster ==
NLEX Road Warriors roster
Players
Coaches

Pos.	#	POB	Name	Height	Weight	DOB (YYYY–MM–DD)	From
G	0	(Philippines)	Evan Nelle	5 ft 11 in (1.80 m)		1998–06–08	De La Salle
C	2	(Philippines)	Michael Miranda (FA)	6 ft 7 in (2.01 m)	210 lb (95 kg)	1990–12–12	San Sebastian
G	3	(Philippines)	Baser Amer (FA)	6 ft 0 in (1.83 m)	170 lb (77 kg)	1992–09–29	San Beda
C	4	(Philippines)	Lorenz Capulong (R)	6 ft 6 in (1.98 m)		2000–10–27	Arellano
F	5	(Philippines)	Arvin Gamboa (R)	6 ft 4 in (1.93 m)		1997–09–13	Mapúa
F	6	(Philippines)	Enoch Valdez	6 ft 2 in (1.88 m)	178 lb (81 kg)	2000–05–26	Lyceum
G	7	(Philippines)	Kevin Alas	6 ft 0 in (1.83 m)	175 lb (79 kg)	1991–11–13	Letran
G	8	(Philippines)	Robert Bolick	6 ft 1 in (1.85 m)	178 lb (81 kg)	1995–09–13	San Beda
F	9	(Philippines)	Dominick Fajardo	6 ft 0 in (1.83 m)	220 lb (100 kg)	1993–10–25	Bulacan State
G/F	10	(New Zealand)	Richie Rodger	6 ft 2 in (1.88 m)	211 lb (96 kg)	1997–01–27	UE
G/F	11	(United States)	Robbie Herndon (IN)	6 ft 3 in (1.91 m)	180 lb (82 kg)	1993–07–16	San Francisco State
G	12	(Philippines)	Matt Nieto	6 ft 1 in (1.85 m)	160 lb (73 kg)	1997–05–31	Ateneo
G	13	(Philippines)	Ljay Gonzales (R)	5 ft 11 in (1.80 m)		1998–12–19	Far Eastern
G/F	14	(United States)	Schonny Winston	6 ft 4 in (1.93 m)	190 lb (86 kg)	1998–07–22	De La Salle
F/C	15	(Canada)	Brandon Ramirez	6 ft 5 in (1.96 m)		1997–10–29	York
F	16	(Philippines)	Kevin Racal	6 ft 3 in (1.91 m)	175 lb (79 kg)	1991–05–16	Letran
F/C	18	(Philippines)	JB Bahio	6 ft 5 in (1.96 m)		1998–05–23	San Beda
C	20	(Philippines)	Dave Marcelo	6 ft 5 in (1.96 m)	223 lb (101 kg)	1989–02–22	San Beda
F	23	(United States)	Deonte Burton (GI)	6 ft 4 in (1.93 m)	240 lb (109 kg)	1994–01–31	Iowa State
F	33	(Australia)	Anthony Semerad	6 ft 4 in (1.93 m)	230 lb (104 kg)	1991–04–25	San Beda
G	77	(Philippines)	Xyrus Torres	6 ft 0 in (1.83 m)		2000–09–23	Far Eastern

Head coach

- (United States) Jimmy Alapag

Assistant coach(es)

- (Philippines) Borgie Hermida (1st assistant)
- (Philippines) Jong Uichico
- (Philippines) Woody Co
- (Philippines) Anton Escolin
- (Philippines) Melo Lim
- (Philippines) Emman Monfort
- (Philippines) JB Sison
- (Philippines) Adonis Tierra
- (Philippines) Virgil Villavicencio (consultant)

Team manager

- (Philippines) Ronald Dulatre

Legend

- (C) Team captain
- (CI) Commissioner's Cup Import
- (GI) Governors' Cup Import
- (EI) EASL Import
- (DP) Unsigned draft pick
- (FA) Free agent
- (IN) Inactive
- (S) Suspended
- (R) Rookie
- Injured

Roster

== Philippine Cup ==
=== Eliminations ===
==== Standings ====
Pos	Team	W	L	PCT	GB	Qualification
1	San Miguel Beermen	9	2	.818	—	Twice-to-beat in the quarterfinals
2	Rain or Shine Elasto Painters	8	3	.727 (Note: Head-to-head record: Rain or Shine 1–0 TNT)	1	Twice-to-beat in the quarterfinals
3	TNT Tropang 5G	8	3	.727	1	Twice-to-beat in the quarterfinals
4	Converge FiberXers	7	4	.636 (Note: Head-to-head record: Converge 1–0 Barangay Ginebra)	2	Twice-to-beat in the quarterfinals
5	Barangay Ginebra San Miguel	7	4	.636	2	Twice-to-win in the quarterfinals
6	Magnolia Chicken Timplados Hotshots	6	5	.545 (Note: Head-to-head quotient: Magnolia 1.09, Meralco 0.99, NLEX 0.93)	3	Twice-to-win in the quarterfinals
7	Meralco Bolts	6	5	.545	3	Twice-to-win in the quarterfinals
8	NLEX Road Warriors	6	5	.545	3	Twice-to-win in the quarterfinals
9	Titan Ultra Giant Risers	4	7	.364	5	
10	Phoenix Fuel Masters	3	8	.273	6	
11	Blackwater Bossing	1	10	.091 (Note: Head-to-head record: Blackwater 1–0 Terrafirma)	8	
12	Terrafirma Dyip	1	10	.091	8	

Source: PBA.ph
Rules for classification: 1) winning percentage; 2) head-to-head goal average (quotient); 3) head-to-head record; 4) overall quotient; 5) coin toss

==== Game log ====
2025–26 PBA Philippine Cup game log
Total: 6–5
October: 4–1

Game	Date	Opponent	Score	High points	High rebounds	High assists	Location Attendance	Record
1	October 8, 2025	San Miguel	W 85–84	Policarpio, Ramirez (16)	JB Bahio (12)	Matt Nieto (7)	Ynares Center Antipolo	1–0
2	October 12, 2025	Terrafirma	L 91–97	Bahio, Torres (14)	Bahio, Semerad (11)	Matt Nieto (7)	Ynares Center Antipolo	1–1
3	October 22, 2025	Phoenix	W 87–81	Kevin Alas (26)	Anthony Semerad (10)	Robert Bolick (9)	Ninoy Aquino Stadium	2–1
4	October 26, 2025	Meralco	W 89–85	JB Bahio (16)	Robert Bolick (8)	Robert Bolick (10)	Ynares Center Antipolo	3–1
5	October 29, 2025	Blackwater	W 99–88	JB Bahio (23)	Jonnel Policarpio (9)	Robert Bolick (12)	Ynares Center Antipolo	4–1

November: 2–1

Game	Date	Opponent	Score	High points	High rebounds	High assists	Location Attendance	Record
6	November 2, 2025	Barangay Ginebra	L 74–104	Xyrus Torres (17)	Dominick Fajardo (9)	Robert Bolick (11)	Ynares Center Antipolo	4–2
7	November 8, 2025	Rain or Shine	W 105–91	Robert Bolick (28)	JB Bahio (13)	Bahio, Bolick (5)	Ynares Center Antipolo	5–2
8	November 16, 2025	Titan Ultra	W 92–83	Robert Bolick (34)	JB Bahio (12)	Robert Bolick (10)	Quadricentennial Pavilion	6–2

December: 0–3

Game	Date	Opponent	Score	High points	High rebounds	High assists	Location Attendance	Record
9	December 7, 2025	Magnolia	L 82–98	Bolick, Mocon (12)	Javee Mocon (8)	Bolick, Fajardo, Mocon, Policarpio (3)	Ynares Center Montalban	6–3
10	December 13, 2025	TNT	L 100–119	Alas, Bahio (13)	JB Bahio (6)	Amer, Nieto (4)	Ynares Center Antipolo	6–4
11	December 17, 2025	Converge	L 95–107 (OT)	Kevin Alas (19)	JB Bahio (7)	Kevin Alas (4)	Ninoy Aquino Stadium	6–5

=== Playoffs ===
==== Bracket ====
Quarterfinals (Top 4 twice-to-beat)
1	San Miguel	101
8	NLEX	94
4	Converge	85	98
5	Barangay Ginebra	105	99*
2	Rain or Shine	79	89
7	Meralco	96	98
3	TNT	118
6	Magnolia	109

Semifinals (Best-of-7)
1	San Miguel	4
5	Barangay Ginebra	2
7	Meralco	1
3	TNT	4

Finals (Best-of-7)
1	San Miguel	4
3	TNT	2

*Game went into overtime

==== Game log ====
2025–26 PBA Philippine Cup playoffs game log
Total: 0–1
Quarterfinals: 0–1

Game	Date	Opponent	Score	High points	High rebounds	High assists	Location Attendance	Series
1	December 25, 2025	San Miguel	L 94–101	Robert Bolick (31)	Robert Bolick (10)	Robert Bolick (7)	Smart Araneta Coliseum	0–1

== Commissioner's Cup ==
=== Eliminations ===
==== Standings ====
Pos	Team	W	L	PCT	GB	Qualification
1	NLEX Road Warriors	10	2	.833	—	Twice-to-beat in the quarterfinals
2	Barangay Ginebra San Miguel	9	3	.750 (Note: Head-to-head record: Barangay Ginebra 1–0 Rain or Shine)	1	Twice-to-beat in the quarterfinals
3	Rain or Shine Elasto Painters	9	3	.750	1	Twice-to-beat in the quarterfinals
4	Meralco Bolts	8	4	.667	2	Twice-to-beat in the quarterfinals
5	Magnolia Chicken Timplados Hotshots	7	5	.583 (Note: Head-to-head record: Magnolia 1–0 San Miguel)	3	Twice-to-win in the quarterfinals
6	San Miguel Beermen	7	5	.583	3	Twice-to-win in the quarterfinals
7	Phoenix Super LPG Fuel Masters	6	6	.500 (Note: Head-to-head record: Phoenix Super LPG 1–0 TNT)	4	Twice-to-win in the quarterfinals
8	TNT Tropang 5G	6	6	.500	4	Twice-to-win in the quarterfinals
9	Converge FiberXers	5	7	.417	5	
10	Terrafirma Dyip	4	8	.333	6	
11	Macau Black Knights (G)	3	9	.250	7	
12	Titan Ultra Giant Risers	2	10	.167 (Note: Head-to-head record: Titan Ultra 1–0 Blackwater)	8	
13	Blackwater Bossing	2	10	.167	8	

Source: PBA.ph
Rules for classification: 1) winning percentage; 2) head-to-head goal average (quotient); 3) head-to-head record; 4) overall quotient; 5) coin toss
(G) Guests

==== Game log ====
2026 PBA Commissioner's Cup game log
Total: 10–2
March: 3–1

Game	Date	Opponent	Score	High points	High rebounds	High assists	Location Attendance	Record
1	March 13, 2026	Blackwater	W 84–81	Robert Bolick (24)	Cady Lalanne (16)	Robert Bolick (7)	Ninoy Aquino Stadium	1–0
2	March 15, 2026	Magnolia	W 112–105	Cady Lalanne (24)	Cady Lalanne (11)	Schonny Winston (6)	Ynares Center Montalban	2–0
3	March 22, 2026	TNT	L 97–103	Cady Lalanne (25)	Cady Lalanne (21)	Robert Bolick (9)	Ynares Center Antipolo	2–1
4	March 27, 2026	Barangay Ginebra	W 118–113	Robert Bolick (32)	Cady Lalanne (14)	Robert Bolick (7)	Smart Araneta Coliseum	3–1

April: 5–1

Game	Date	Opponent	Score	High points	High rebounds	High assists	Location Attendance	Record
5	April 5, 2026	Phoenix Super LPG	W 120–102	Cady Lalanne (29)	Cady Lalanne (10)	Robert Bolick (14)	Smart Araneta Coliseum	4–1
6	April 14, 2026	Macau	W 106–97	Cady Lalanne (28)	Cady Lalanne (18)	Robert Bolick (11)	Ynares Center Antipolo	5–1
7	April 17, 2026	Meralco	W 104–101 (OT)	Cady Lalanne (34)	Cady Lalanne (25)	Robert Bolick (8)	Ynares Center Montalban	6–1
8	April 19, 2026	San Miguel	L 94–98	Cady Lalanne (35)	Cady Lalanne (12)	Robert Bolick (12)	Ynares Center Antipolo	6–2
9	April 25, 2026	Terrafirma	W 95–85	Robert Bolick (20)	Cady Lalanne (12)	Robert Bolick (6)	Ninoy Aquino Stadium	7–2
10	April 29, 2026	Rain or Shine	W 92–90	Robert Bolick (30)	Cady Lalanne (14)	Robert Bolick (11)	Ninoy Aquino Stadium	8–2

May: 2–0

Game	Date	Opponent	Score	High points	High rebounds	High assists	Location Attendance	Record
11	May 2, 2026	Converge	W 100–81	Cady Lalanne (22)	Cady Lalanne (14)	Bolick, Winston (5)	Ninoy Aquino Stadium	9–2
12	May 5, 2026	Titan Ultra	W 123–112 (OT)	Cady Lalanne (29)	Cady Lalanne (20)	Robert Bolick (10)	Ninoy Aquino Stadium	10–2

=== Playoffs ===
==== Bracket ====
Quarterfinals (Top 4 twice-to-beat)
1	NLEX	93	112
8	TNT	96	118
4	Meralco	89	105
5	Magnolia	95	102*
2	Barangay Ginebra	112
7	Phoenix Super LPG	81
3	Rain or Shine	113
6	San Miguel	104

Semifinals (Best-of-7)
8	TNT	4
4	Meralco	2
2	Barangay Ginebra	4
3	Rain or Shine	2

Finals (Best-of-7)
8	TNT	3
2	Barangay Ginebra	4

*Game went into overtime

==== Game log ====
2026 PBA Commissioner's Cup playoffs game log
Total: 0–2
Quarterfinals: 0–2

Game	Date	Opponent	Score	High points	High rebounds	High assists	Location Attendance	Series
1	May 13, 2026	TNT	L 93–96	Cady Lalanne (17)	Cady Lalanne (15)	Ljay Gonzales (5)	Ninoy Aquino Stadium	0–1
2	May 16, 2026	TNT	L 112–118	Cady Lalanne (46)	Cady Lalanne (15)	Bolick, Gonzales (6)	Ynares Center Antipolo	0–2

== Governors' Cup ==
=== Eliminations ===
==== Standings ====
Pos	Team	W	L	PCT	GB	Qualification
1	NLEX Road Warriors	9	3	.750 (Note: Head-to-head quotient: NLEX 1.05, San Miguel 0.95)	—	Quarterfinals
2	San Miguel Beermen	9	3	.750	—	Quarterfinals
3	Converge FiberXers	8	4	.667	1	Quarterfinals
4	TNT Tropang 5G	7	5	.583	2	Quarterfinals
5	Terrafirma Dyip	5	7	.417	4	
6	Macau Giant Pandas (G)	2	10	.167 (Note: Head-to-head quotient: Macau 1.01, Titan Ultra 0.99)	7	
7	Titan Ultra Giant Risers	2	10	.167	7	

Source: PBA.ph
Rules for classification: 1) winning percentage; 2) head-to-head quotient (goal average); 3) head-to-head record; 4) coin toss
(G) Guests

==== Game log ====
2026 PBA Governors' Cup game log
Total: 9–3
July: 4–0

Game	Date	Opponent	Score	High points	High rebounds	High assists	Location Attendance	Record
1	July 10, 2026	Macau	W 114–75	DeQuan Jones (23)	DeQuan Jones (11)	Robert Bolick (8)	Ynares Center Antipolo	1–0
2	July 12, 2026	Terrafirma	W 101–100	DeQuan Jones (30)	Enoch Valdez (9)	Robert Bolick (7)	Ynares Center Montalban	2–0
3	July 14, 2026	Titan Ultra	W 135–100	Schonny Winston (30)	Enoch Valdez (10)	Schonny Winston (6)	Ynares Center Antipolo	3–0
4	July 26, 2026	San Miguel	W 110–96	DeQuan Jones (27)	DeQuan Jones (10)	Robert Bolick (12)	Smart Araneta Coliseum	4–0

August: 3–2

Game	Date	Opponent	Score	High points	High rebounds	High assists	Location Attendance	Record
5	August 1, 2026	Converge	W 119–107	DeQuan Jones (28)	Bolick, Jones (9)	Robert Bolick (10)	SM Mall of Asia Arena	5–0
6	August 4, 2026	TNT	W 88–83	DeQuan Jones (27)	DeQuan Jones (7)	Bolick, Winston (5)	Ninoy Aquino Stadium	6–0
7	August 7, 2026	Terrafirma	L 109–114	Robert Bolick (20)	JB Bahio (16)	Robert Bolick (8)	Ninoy Aquino Stadium	6–1
8	August 11, 2026	TNT	W 118–111 (OT)	Robert Bolick (27)	Semerad, Winston (7)	Robert Bolick (8)	Ynares Center Antipolo	7–1
9	August 14, 2026	Converge	L 110–112	Ljay Gonzales (23)	JB Bahio (12)	Bolick, Winston (6)	Smart Araneta Coliseum	7–2

October: 2–1

Game	Date	Opponent	Score	High points	High rebounds	High assists	Location Attendance	Record
10	October 7, 2026	Macau	W 138–78	Schonny Winston (25)	Deonte Burton (14)	Deonte Burton (8)	Ninoy Aquino Stadium	8–2
11	October 14, 2026	Titan Ultra	W 147–115	Deonte Burton (21)	Deonte Burton (9)	Robert Bolick (8)	Ninoy Aquino Stadium	9–2
12	October 21, 2026	San Miguel	L 133–135	Deonte Burton (43)	Enoch Valdez (8)	Robert Bolick (15)	Ynares Center Antipolo	9–3

=== Playoffs ===
==== Bracket ====
Quarterfinals (Best-of-5)
A1	NLEX	3
B4	Phoenix Super LPG	0
B2	Rain or Shine	1
A3	Converge	3
B1	Magnolia	0
A4	TNT	3
A2	San Miguel	2
B3	Barangay Ginebra	3

Semifinals (Best-of-5)
A1	NLEX	0
A3	Converge	0
A4	TNT	0
B3	Barangay Ginebra	0

Finals (Best-of-7)
A

==== Game log ====
2026 PBA Governors' Cup playoffs game log
Total: 3–0
Quarterfinals: 3–0

Game	Date	Opponent	Score	High points	High rebounds	High assists	Location Attendance	Series
1	October 25, 2026	Phoenix Super LPG	W 97–92	Deonte Burton (27)	Deonte Burton (11)	Robert Bolick (4)	Ynares Center Antipolo	1–0
2	October 28, 2026	Phoenix Super LPG	W 124–117	Bolick, Winston (31)	Deonte Burton (10)	Robert Bolick (4)	Ynares Center Antipolo	2–0
3	October 31, 2026	Phoenix Super LPG	W 137–89	Robert Bolick (23)	Deonte Burton (8)	Alas, Bolick (5)	Ninoy Aquino Stadium	3–0

Semifinals: 0–0

Game	Date	Opponent	Score	High points	High rebounds	High assists	Location Attendance	Series
1	December 4, 2026	Converge					Ninoy Aquino Stadium	
2	December 6, 2026	Converge					SM Mall of Asia Arena	
3	December 9, 2026	Converge					Ynares Center Antipolo	

== Transactions ==
=== Free agency ===
==== Signings ====
Player	Date signed	Contract amount	Contract length	Former team	Ref.
Robbie Herndon	August 4, 2025	Not disclosed	1 year	Re-signed	
Richie Rodger	August 27, 2025	Not disclosed	1 year	Re-signed	
Sidney Onwubere	November 14, 2025	Not disclosed	2 conferences	NorthPort Batang Pier	
Dominick Fajardo	December 3, 2025	Not disclosed	2 years	Re-signed	
Anthony Semerad	December 3, 2025	Not disclosed	2 years	Re-signed	
Robert Bolick	August 26, 2026	Not disclosed	3 years	Re-signed	

==== Subtractions ====
Player	Number	Position	Reason	New team	Ref.
Sean Anthony	10	Power forward / Small forward	Retired		

=== Trades ===
==== Mid-season ====
February 2026
February 24, 2026	To NLEX Schonny Winston (from Converge); Kevin Racal (from Converge)	To Converge Jonnel Policarpio (from NLEX); Kurt Reyson (from Meralco); 2028 (S52) Meralco second-round pick	To Meralco Javee Mocon
July 2026
July 6, 2026	To NLEX Evan Nelle	To Phoenix Super LPG Sidney Onwubere

=== Recruited imports ===
Tournament	Name	Debuted	Last game	Record	Ref.
Commissioner's Cup	Cady Lalanne	March 13, 2026 (vs. Blackwater)	May 16, 2026 (vs. TNT)	10–4	
Governors' Cup	DeQuan Jones	July 10, 2026 (vs. Macau)	August 11, 2026 (vs. TNT)	7–1	
Governors' Cup	Deonte Burton	October 7, 2026 (vs. Macau)		5–1	
