= 2025–26 Converge FiberXers season =

- Head coach: Dennis Pineda
- General manager: Jacob Lao
- Governor: Archen Cayabyab
- Owner: Converge ICT Solutions, Inc.

Philippine Cup results
- Record: 7–4 (63.6%)
- Place: 4th
- Playoff finish: Quarterfinalist (lost to Barangay Ginebra with twice-to-beat advantage)

Commissioner's Cup results
- Record: 5–7 (41.7%)
- Place: 9th
- Playoff finish: Did not qualify

Governors' Cup results
- Record: 8–4 (66.7%)
- Place: 3rd in group A
- Playoff finish: TBD

Converge FiberXers seasons

The 2025–26 Converge FiberXers season is the 4th season of the franchise in the Philippine Basketball Association (PBA).

== Key dates ==
- September 7, 2025: The PBA season 50 draft was held at the SM Mall of Asia Music Hall in Pasay.

== Draft picks ==
Round	Pick	Player	Position	Place of birth	College
1	2	Juan Gómez de Liaño	PG/SG	Philippines	UP
2	21	Kobe Monje	SF	Philippines	Letran
3	32	Tony Ynot	SG	Philippines	Benilde
4	43	JM Manalang	PF	Philippines	UE
5	53	JP Cauilan	PF/SF	Philippines	NU
6	60	Raphael Mallari	PG/SG	Philippines	Adamson
7	66	Jordan Sta. Ana	PG/SG	Philippines	Arellano
8	70	Geremy Robinson	SG/PG	United States	UST
9	73	Patrick Ramos	PG	United States	JRU
10	76	Niel Tolentino	PG/SG	Philippines	Arellano

== Roster ==
Converge FiberXers roster
Players
Coaches

Pos.	#	POB	Name	Height	Weight	DOB (YYYY–MM–DD)	From
G	1	(Philippines)	Juan Gómez de Liaño (R)	6 ft 0 in (1.83 m)	163 lb (74 kg)	1999–11–19	UP
G/F	2	(Philippines)	Archie Concepcion	6 ft 2 in (1.88 m)	189 lb (86 kg)	1996–05–18	Arellano
G/F	3	(Philippines)	Jaydee Tungcab	6 ft 3 in (1.91 m)	196 lb (89 kg)	1997–05–05	UP
F	8	(Philippines)	Calvin Abueva	6 ft 3 in (1.91 m)	209 lb (95 kg)	1988–02–04	San Sebastian
G/F	9	(Philippines)	John Lloyd Clemente (R)	6 ft 3 in (1.91 m)	176 lb (80 kg)	1998–07–15	National-U
G	10	(United States)	Mikey Williams	6 ft 2 in (1.88 m)	190 lb (86 kg)	1991–10–27	Cal State Fullerton
G	11	(Philippines)	MJ Garcia	6 ft 0 in (1.83 m)		1998–11–25	SPCF
G	12	(United States)	Alec Stockton	6 ft 2 in (1.88 m)	170 lb (77 kg)	1998–06–24	Far Eastern
G	13	(Philippines)	Kurt Reyson (IN)	5 ft 10 in (1.78 m)		1998–09–08	Letran
C	15	(Philippines)	Justin Arana	6 ft 7 in (2.01 m)	231 lb (105 kg)	1999–03–21	Arellano
F	16	(Philippines)	Jonnel Policarpio	6 ft 5 in (1.96 m)		2001–12–16	De La Salle
F/C	19	(Philippines)	Justine Baltazar	6 ft 9 in (2.06 m)	250 lb (113 kg)	1997–02–19	De La Salle
C	20	(Philippines)	Larry Muyang	6 ft 6 in (1.98 m)	220 lb (100 kg)	1995–06–04	Letran
F/C	21	(Philippines)	Jhaymo Eguilos	6 ft 6 in (1.98 m)	190 lb (86 kg)	1986–08–27	Far Eastern
F	23	(United States)	Cameron Clark (GI)	6 ft 7 in (2.01 m)	210 lb (95 kg)	1991–09–16	Oklahoma
C	24	(Philippines)	Ronan Santos	6 ft 7 in (2.01 m)		1997–03–24	Arellano
C	27	(Philippines)	Ladis Lepalam	6 ft 9 in (2.06 m)	200 lb (91 kg)	1999–11–27	St. Benilde

Head coach

- (Philippines) Dennis Pineda

Assistant coach(es)

- (Philippines) Franco Atienza (1st assistant)
- (Philippines) Frederick Dimatulac
- (Philippines) Danny Ildefonso
- (Philippines) Willie Miller
- (Philippines) Daniel Rose
- (Philippines) Karl Santos
- (Serbia) Djordje Jovičić (consultant)

Team manager

- (Philippines) Jacob Lao
- (Philippines) Erwin Dotimas (assistant)

Legend

- (C) Team captain
- (CI) Commissioner's Cup Import
- (GI) Governors' Cup Import
- (EI) EASL Import
- (DP) Unsigned draft pick
- (FA) Free agent
- (IN) Inactive
- (S) Suspended
- (R) Rookie
- Injured

Roster

== Philippine Cup ==
=== Eliminations ===
==== Standings ====
Pos	Team	W	L	PCT	GB	Qualification
1	San Miguel Beermen	9	2	.818	—	Twice-to-beat in the quarterfinals
2	Rain or Shine Elasto Painters	8	3	.727 (Note: Head-to-head record: Rain or Shine 1–0 TNT)	1	Twice-to-beat in the quarterfinals
3	TNT Tropang 5G	8	3	.727	1	Twice-to-beat in the quarterfinals
4	Converge FiberXers	7	4	.636 (Note: Head-to-head record: Converge 1–0 Barangay Ginebra)	2	Twice-to-beat in the quarterfinals
5	Barangay Ginebra San Miguel	7	4	.636	2	Twice-to-win in the quarterfinals
6	Magnolia Chicken Timplados Hotshots	6	5	.545 (Note: Head-to-head quotient: Magnolia 1.09, Meralco 0.99, NLEX 0.93)	3	Twice-to-win in the quarterfinals
7	Meralco Bolts	6	5	.545	3	Twice-to-win in the quarterfinals
8	NLEX Road Warriors	6	5	.545	3	Twice-to-win in the quarterfinals
9	Titan Ultra Giant Risers	4	7	.364	5	
10	Phoenix Fuel Masters	3	8	.273	6	
11	Blackwater Bossing	1	10	.091 (Note: Head-to-head record: Blackwater 1–0 Terrafirma)	8	
12	Terrafirma Dyip	1	10	.091	8	

Source: PBA.ph
Rules for classification: 1) winning percentage; 2) head-to-head goal average (quotient); 3) head-to-head record; 4) overall quotient; 5) coin toss

==== Game log ====
2025–26 PBA Philippine Cup game log
Total: 7–4
October: 3–1

Game	Date	Opponent	Score	High points	High rebounds	High assists	Location Attendance	Record
1	October 11, 2025	Titan Ultra	W 129–92	Justin Arana (28)	Justin Arana (22)	Juan Gómez de Liaño (11)	Ynares Center Montalban	1–0
2	October 18, 2025	TNT	L 103–110	Arana, Stockton (19)	Justine Baltazar (12)	Juan Gómez de Liaño (6)	Chavit Coliseum	1–1
3	October 22, 2025	Terrafirma	W 125–108	Alec Stockton (22)	Justin Arana (12)	Juan Gómez de Liaño (12)	Ninoy Aquino Stadium	2–1
4	October 25, 2025	Phoenix	W 128–114	Alec Stockton (22)	Justine Baltazar (12)	Juan Gómez de Liaño (12)	Ynares Center Antipolo	3–1

November: 2–1

Game	Date	Opponent	Score	High points	High rebounds	High assists	Location Attendance	Record
5	November 2, 2025	San Miguel	L 90–96	Schonny Winston (20)	Justine Baltazar (19)	Juan Gómez de Liaño (6)	Ynares Center Antipolo	3–2
6	November 8, 2025	Blackwater	W 99–94	Alec Stockton (28)	Justine Baltazar (14)	Justine Baltazar (7)	Ynares Center Antipolo	4–2
7	November 14, 2025	Barangay Ginebra	W 106–96	Juan Gómez de Liaño (32)	Justin Arana (13)	Baltazar, Gómez de Liaño (6)	Smart Araneta Coliseum	5–2

December: 2–2

Game	Date	Opponent	Score	High points	High rebounds	High assists	Location Attendance	Record
8	December 5, 2025	Magnolia	W 114–97	Juan Gómez de Liaño (27)	Justine Baltazar (14)	Justin Arana (7)	Ynares Center Antipolo	6–2
9	December 7, 2025	Rain or Shine	L 84–90	Juan Gómez de Liaño (20)	Justine Baltazar (21)	Juan Gómez de Liaño (6)	Ynares Center Montalban	6–3
10	December 14, 2025	Meralco	L 84–105	Juan Gómez de Liaño (27)	Justin Arana (9)	Arana, Gómez de Liaño (5)	Ynares Center Antipolo	6–4
11	December 17, 2025	NLEX	W 107–95 (OT)	Justine Baltazar (25)	Justine Baltazar (24)	Juan Gómez de Liaño (10)	Ninoy Aquino Stadium	7–4

=== Playoffs ===
==== Bracket ====
Quarterfinals (Top 4 twice-to-beat)
1	San Miguel	101
8	NLEX	94
4	Converge	85	98
5	Barangay Ginebra	105	99*
2	Rain or Shine	79	89
7	Meralco	96	98
3	TNT	118
6	Magnolia	109

Semifinals (Best-of-7)
1	San Miguel	4
5	Barangay Ginebra	2
7	Meralco	1
3	TNT	4

Finals (Best-of-7)
1	San Miguel	4
3	TNT	2

*Game went into overtime

==== Game log ====
2025–26 PBA Philippine Cup playoffs game log
Total: 0–2
Quarterfinals: 0–2

Game	Date	Opponent	Score	High points	High rebounds	High assists	Location Attendance	Series
1	December 25, 2025	Barangay Ginebra	L 85–105	Justine Baltazar (19)	Justine Baltazar (13)	Justin Arana (6)	Smart Araneta Coliseum	0–1
2	December 28, 2025	Barangay Ginebra	L 98–99 (OT)	Juan Gómez de Liaño (25)	Justine Baltazar (20)	Alec Stockton (6)	Smart Araneta Coliseum	0–2

== Commissioner's Cup ==
=== Eliminations ===
==== Standings ====
Pos	Team	W	L	PCT	GB	Qualification
1	NLEX Road Warriors	10	2	.833	—	Twice-to-beat in the quarterfinals
2	Barangay Ginebra San Miguel	9	3	.750 (Note: Head-to-head record: Barangay Ginebra 1–0 Rain or Shine)	1	Twice-to-beat in the quarterfinals
3	Rain or Shine Elasto Painters	9	3	.750	1	Twice-to-beat in the quarterfinals
4	Meralco Bolts	8	4	.667	2	Twice-to-beat in the quarterfinals
5	Magnolia Chicken Timplados Hotshots	7	5	.583 (Note: Head-to-head record: Magnolia 1–0 San Miguel)	3	Twice-to-win in the quarterfinals
6	San Miguel Beermen	7	5	.583	3	Twice-to-win in the quarterfinals
7	Phoenix Super LPG Fuel Masters	6	6	.500 (Note: Head-to-head record: Phoenix Super LPG 1–0 TNT)	4	Twice-to-win in the quarterfinals
8	TNT Tropang 5G	6	6	.500	4	Twice-to-win in the quarterfinals
9	Converge FiberXers	5	7	.417	5	
10	Terrafirma Dyip	4	8	.333	6	
11	Macau Black Knights (G)	3	9	.250	7	
12	Titan Ultra Giant Risers	2	10	.167 (Note: Head-to-head record: Titan Ultra 1–0 Blackwater)	8	
13	Blackwater Bossing	2	10	.167	8	

Source: PBA.ph
Rules for classification: 1) winning percentage; 2) head-to-head goal average (quotient); 3) head-to-head record; 4) overall quotient; 5) coin toss
(G) Guests

==== Game log ====
2026 PBA Commissioner's Cup game log
Total: 5–7
March: 1–4

Game	Date	Opponent	Score	High points	High rebounds	High assists	Location Attendance	Record
1	March 11, 2026	Macau	W 102–94	Alec Stockton (18)	Kylor Kelley (19)	Juan Gómez de Liaño (6)	Ninoy Aquino Stadium	1–0
2	March 14, 2026	Terrafirma	L 100–111 (OT)	Gómez de Liaño, Kelley (17)	Kylor Kelley (22)	Gómez de Liaño, Kelley (6)	Ynares Center Montalban	1–1
3	March 18, 2026	Meralco	L 88–109	Alec Stockton (18)	Justine Baltazar (15)	Arana, Williams (4)	Ynares Center Antipolo	1–2
4	March 25, 2026	San Miguel	L 99–103	Justine Baltazar (19)	Kylor Kelley (20)	Stockton, Williams (8)	Ynares Center Antipolo	1–3
5	March 29, 2026	Barangay Ginebra	L 93–99	Justine Baltazar (20)	Kylor Kelley (15)	Mikey Williams (8)	Smart Araneta Coliseum	1–4

April: 3–2

Game	Date	Opponent	Score	High points	High rebounds	High assists	Location Attendance	Record
6	April 10, 2026	Rain or Shine	L 111–120	Alec Stockton (17)	Kylor Kelley (16)	Mikey Williams (10)	SM Mall of Asia Arena	1–5
7	April 15, 2026	Titan Ultra	W 103–82	Justin Arana (19)	Kylor Kelley (14)	MJ Garcia (5)	Ynares Center Antipolo	2–5
8	April 19, 2026	Magnolia	L 94–106	Juan Gómez de Liaño (22)	Arana, Baltazar, Kelley (6)	Mikey Williams (6)	Ynares Center Antipolo	2–6
9	April 22, 2026	TNT	W 97–92	Justin Arana (21)	Justin Arana (10)	Juan Gómez de Liaño (7)	Ninoy Aquino Stadium	3–6
10	April 26, 2026	Phoenix Super LPG	W 130–103	Donovan Smith (32)	Justine Baltazar (14)	Arana, Garcia (5)	Smart Araneta Coliseum	4–6

May: 1–1

Game	Date	Opponent	Score	High points	High rebounds	High assists	Location Attendance	Record
11	May 2, 2026	NLEX	L 81–100	Justin Arana (21)	Justine Baltazar (9)	Juan Gómez de Liaño (8)	Ninoy Aquino Stadium	4–7
12	May 9, 2026	Blackwater	W 136–122	Juan Gómez de Liaño (25)	Justine Baltazar (11)	Donovan Smith (5)	Ynares Center Antipolo	5–7

== Governors' Cup ==
=== Eliminations ===
==== Standings ====
Pos	Team	W	L	PCT	GB	Qualification
1	NLEX Road Warriors	9	3	.750 (Note: Head-to-head quotient: NLEX 1.05, San Miguel 0.95)	—	Quarterfinals
2	San Miguel Beermen	9	3	.750	—	Quarterfinals
3	Converge FiberXers	8	4	.667	1	Quarterfinals
4	TNT Tropang 5G	7	5	.583	2	Quarterfinals
5	Terrafirma Dyip	5	7	.417	4	
6	Macau Giant Pandas (G)	2	10	.167 (Note: Head-to-head quotient: Macau 1.01, Titan Ultra 0.99)	7	
7	Titan Ultra Giant Risers	2	10	.167	7	

Source: PBA.ph
Rules for classification: 1) winning percentage; 2) head-to-head quotient (goal average); 3) head-to-head record; 4) coin toss
(G) Guests

==== Game log ====
2026 PBA Governors' Cup game log
Total: 8–4
July: 3–2

Game	Date	Opponent	Score	High points	High rebounds	High assists	Location Attendance	Record
1	July 12, 2026	Titan Ultra	W 105–74	Jalen Hudson (20)	Calvin Abueva (11)	Juan Gómez de Liaño (9)	Ynares Center Montalban	1–0
2	July 15, 2026	Terrafirma	W 105–103	Justin Arana (31)	Justine Baltazar (14)	Mikey Williams (5)	Smart Araneta Coliseum	2–0
3	July 17, 2026	Macau	W 149–124	Justin Arana (39)	Justin Arana (12)	Juan Gómez de Liaño (12)	Ninoy Aquino Stadium	3–0
4	July 22, 2026	San Miguel	L 122–128	Justin Arana (29)	Justine Baltazar (12)	Abueva, Stockton (7)	Ynares Center Antipolo	3–1
5	July 28, 2026	TNT	L 107–110	Jamaal Franklin (30)	Justine Baltazar (11)	Juan Gómez de Liaño (5)	Ninoy Aquino Stadium	3–2

August: 2–2

Game	Date	Opponent	Score	High points	High rebounds	High assists	Location Attendance	Record
6	August 1, 2026	NLEX	L 107–119	Jamaal Franklin (26)	Calvin Abueva (12)	Franklin, Gómez de Liaño (6)	SM Mall of Asia Arena	3–3
7	August 5, 2026	San Miguel	L 114–126	Abueva, Franklin (26)	Abueva, Franklin (12)	Juan Gómez de Liaño (8)	Smart Araneta Coliseum	3–4
8	August 11, 2026	Terrafirma	W 120–103	Cameron Clark (22)	Justin Arana (12)	Juan Gómez de Liaño (8)	Ynares Center Antipolo	4–4
9	August 14, 2026	NLEX	W 112–110	Cameron Clark (37)	Calvin Abueva (13)	Juan Gómez de Liaño (8)	Smart Araneta Coliseum	5–4

October: 3–0

Game	Date	Opponent	Score	High points	High rebounds	High assists	Location Attendance	Record
10	October 11, 2026	Titan Ultra	W 152–119	Juan Gómez de Liaño (32)	Justine Baltazar (12)	Juan Gómez de Liaño (12)	Smart Araneta Coliseum	6–4
11	October 16, 2026	Macau	W 162–108	Cameron Clark (32)	Juan Gómez de Liaño (12)	Juan Gómez de Liaño (12)	Ynares Center Antipolo	7–4
12	October 18, 2026	TNT	W 114–112 (OT)	Cameron Clark (27)	Justine Baltazar (12)	Juan Gómez de Liaño (8)	Ynares Center Antipolo	8–4

=== Playoffs ===
==== Bracket ====
Quarterfinals (Best-of-5)
A1	NLEX	3
B4	Phoenix Super LPG	0
B2	Rain or Shine	1
A3	Converge	3
B1	Magnolia	0
A4	TNT	3
A2	San Miguel	2
B3	Barangay Ginebra	3

Semifinals (Best-of-5)
A1	NLEX	0
A3	Converge	0
A4	TNT	0
B3	Barangay Ginebra	0

Finals (Best-of-7)
A

==== Game log ====
2026 PBA Governors' Cup playoffs game log
Total: 3–1
Quarterfinals: 3–1

Game	Date	Opponent	Score	High points	High rebounds	High assists	Location Attendance	Series
1	October 27, 2026	Rain or Shine	L 120–124	Cameron Clark (28)	Cameron Clark (8)	Juan Gómez de Liaño (7)	Smart Araneta Coliseum	0–1
2	October 30, 2026	Rain or Shine	W 130–125	Cameron Clark (22)	Justine Baltazar (11)	Juan Gómez de Liaño (8)	Ninoy Aquino Stadium	1–1
3	November 3, 2026	Rain or Shine	W 105–89	Juan Gómez de Liaño (19)	Juan Gómez de Liaño (13)	Juan Gómez de Liaño (6)	Dasmariñas Arena	2–1
4	November 6, 2026	Rain or Shine	W 120–109	Cameron Clark (32)	Cameron Clark (12)	Cameron Clark (6)	Smart Araneta Coliseum	3–1

Semifinals: 0–0

Game	Date	Opponent	Score	High points	High rebounds	High assists	Location Attendance	Series
1	December 4, 2026	NLEX					Ninoy Aquino Stadium	
2	December 6, 2026	NLEX					SM Mall of Asia Arena	
3	December 9, 2026	NLEX					Ynares Center Antipolo	

== Transactions ==
=== Free agency ===
==== Signings ====
Player	Date signed	Contract amount	Contract length	Former team	Ref.
Jeo Ambohot	August 27, 2025	Not disclosed	1 year	Re-signed	
Bryan Santos	August 27, 2025	Not disclosed	2 years	Re-signed	
Schonny Winston	August 27, 2025	₱420,000 per month (max. contract)	2 years	Re-signed	
Rafi Reavis	September 27, 2025	Not disclosed	Not disclosed	Magnolia Chicken Timplados Hotshots	
JR Raflores	October 14, 2025	Not disclosed	Not disclosed	Muntinlupa Cagers (MPBL)	
John Lloyd Clemente	October 21, 2025	Not disclosed	Not disclosed	Pampanga Giant Lanterns (MPBL)	
Archie Concepcion	October 21, 2025	Not disclosed	Not disclosed	Pampanga Giant Lanterns (MPBL)	
Larry Muyang	October 21, 2025	Not disclosed	Not disclosed	Pampanga Giant Lanterns (MPBL)	
Jhaymo Eguilos	October 25, 2025	Not disclosed	Not disclosed	Pampanga Giant Lanterns (MPBL)	
Vic Manuel	December 15, 2025	Not disclosed	Not disclosed	Pangasinan Heatwaves (MPBL)	
Mikey Williams	March 4, 2026	Not disclosed	1 year	TNT Tropang Giga	
Jaydee Tungcab	March 31, 2026	Not disclosed	Not disclosed	Blackwater Bossing	

==== Subtractions ====
Player	Date signed	Contract amount	Contract length	Former team	Ref.
Jhan Nermal	29	Small forward	Going to other leagues	Pampanga Giant Lanterns (MPBL)	
Jackson Corpuz	1	Power forward	Contract not renewed	GenSan Warriors (MPBL)	
Vic Manuel	87	Power forward	Contract not renewed	Zamboanga Valientes (Dubai International Basketball Championship)	
JL delos Santos	23 / 24	Point guard	Did not sign an contract extension	Phoenix Super LPG Fuel Masters	
Rafi Reavis (Note: Rafi Reavis was signed last September 27, 2025 by Converge but he did not play any single game with the team.)		Center	Free agent	Phoenix Super LPG Fuel Masters	

=== Trades ===
==== Pre-season ====
September 2025
September 4, 2025	To Converge Larry Muyang (from Phoenix)	To NorthPort Jeo Ambohot (from Converge)	To Phoenix Evan Nelle (from NorthPort)
September 5, 2025	To Converge 2025 Phoenix first-round pick (No. 2); 2027 Phoenix second-round pick	To Phoenix Bryan Santos; 2025 Converge first-round pick (No. 8)
October 2025
October 2, 2025	To Converge Rights of Mark Omega	To Rain or Shine 2028 (S52) Converge second-round pick

==== Philippine Cup ====
October 2025
October 24, 2025	To Converge Rights of Dave Ildefonso	To Titan Ultra Kobe Monje; 2027 (S51) Converge second-round pick 2028 (S52) Converge first-round pick
December 2025
December 10, 2025	To Converge 2027 (S51) Titan Ultra second-round pick	To Titan Ultra Paolo Javillonar

==== Mid-season ====
February 2026
February 3, 2026	To Converge Calvin Abueva	To Titan Ultra King Caralipio; Mark Omega; Rey Suerte
February 24, 2026	To Converge Jonnel Policarpio (from NLEX); Kurt Reyson (from Meralco); 2028 (S52) Meralco second-round pick	To Meralco Javee Mocon	To NLEX Schonny Winston (from Converge); Kevin Racal (from Converge)
February 24, 2026	To Converge James Kwekuteye	To Phoenix Super LPG Rights of Tony Ynot

=== Recruited imports ===
Tournament	Name	Debuted	Last game	Record	Ref.
Commissioner's Cup	Kylor Kelley	March 11, 2026 (vs. Macau)	April 22, 2026 (vs. TNT)	3–6	
Commissioner's Cup	Donovan Smith	April 26, 2026 (vs. Phoenix Super LPG)	May 9, 2026 (vs. Blackwater)	2–1	
Governors' Cup	Jalen Hudson	July 12, 2026 (vs. Titan Ultra)	July 22, 2026 (vs. San Miguel)	3–1	
Governors' Cup	Jamaal Franklin	July 28, 2026 (vs. TNT)	August 5, 2026 (vs. San Miguel)	0–3	
Governors' Cup	Cameron Clark	August 11, 2026 (vs. Terrafirma)		8–1	
