= 2025–26 San Miguel Beermen season =

- Head coach: Leo Austria
- General manager: Gee Abanilla; Daniel Henares (assistant)
- Governor: Robert Non
- Owners: San Miguel Brewery, Inc. (a San Miguel Corporation subsidiary)

Philippine Cup results
- Record: 9–2 (81.8%)
- Place: 1st
- Playoff finish: Champions (def. TNT, 4–2)

Commissioner's Cup results
- Record: 7–5 (58.3%)
- Place: 6th
- Playoff finish: Quarterfinalist (lost to Rain or Shine with twice-to-win disadvantage)

Governors' Cup results
- Record: 9–3 (75%)
- Place: 2nd in group A
- Playoff finish: Quarterfinalist (lost to Barangay Ginebra, 2–3)

San Miguel Beermen seasons

The 2025–26 San Miguel Beermen season was the 50th season of the franchise in the Philippine Basketball Association (PBA).

== Key dates ==
- September 7, 2025: The PBA season 50 draft was held at the SM Mall of Asia Music Hall in Pasay.

== Draft picks ==
Round	Pick	Player	Position	Place of birth	College
1	11	Chris Miller	SG	United States	Salem
3	33	Royce Mantua	SF/SG	Australia	Adamson
4	44	Justine Guevarra	PF	Philippines	UE
5	54	Axel Iñigo	PG	Philippines	FEU
6	61	Jacey Cruz	PG	Philippines	Qatar

== Roster ==
San Miguel Beermen roster
Players
Coaches

Pos.	#	POB	Name	Height	Weight	DOB (YYYY–MM–DD)	From
G	1	(United States)	Kris Rosales	6 ft 0 in (1.83 m)	165 lb (75 kg)	1990–12–20	Hope International
F	2	(Philippines)	Don Trollano	6 ft 3 in (1.91 m)	182 lb (83 kg)	1992–01–07	Adamson
F/C	3	(United States)	Moala Tautuaa	6 ft 8 in (2.03 m)	245 lb (111 kg)	1989–04–30	Chadron State
G	6	(United States)	Chris Ross	6 ft 1 in (1.85 m)	180 lb (82 kg)	1985–03–09	Marshall
G	7	(United States)	Jerrick Ahanmisi	6 ft 1 in (1.85 m)	185 lb (84 kg)	1997–10–16	Adamson
F	11	(Sweden)	Andreas Cahilig	6 ft 5 in (1.96 m)	190 lb (86 kg)	1991–01–22	EARIST
G/F	13	(United States)	Marcio Lassiter	6 ft 2 in (1.88 m)	185 lb (84 kg)	1987–05–16	Cal State Fullerton
C	15	(Philippines)	June Mar Fajardo	6 ft 10 in (2.08 m)	268 lb (122 kg)	1989–11–17	Cebu
G	18	(Philippines)	Paolo Hernandez	6 ft 0 in (1.83 m)	196 lb (89 kg)	1999–01–09	Mapúa
G/F	21	(Philippines)	Jeron Teng	6 ft 2 in (1.88 m)	185 lb (84 kg)	1994–03–21	De La Salle
C	22	(Philippines)	JM Calma	6 ft 6 in (1.98 m)	193 lb (88 kg)	1997–12–02	San Sebastian
G/F	23	(Australia)	Royce Mantua (R)	6 ft 4 in (1.93 m)		2002–04–12	Adamson
G	39	(Philippines)	Jericho Cruz	6 ft 1 in (1.85 m)	190 lb (86 kg)	1990–10–11	Adamson
G/F	77	(Hong Kong)	CJ Perez	6 ft 2 in (1.88 m)	185 lb (84 kg)	1993–11–17	Lyceum
F	91	(Philippines)	Rodney Brondial	6 ft 5 in (1.96 m)	210 lb (95 kg)	1990–11–20	Adamson
F	94	(United States)	George King (GI)	6 ft 6 in (1.98 m)	220 lb (100 kg)	1994–01–15	Colorado

Head coach

- (Philippines) Leo Austria

Assistant coach(es)

- (Philippines) Peter Martin (1st assistant)
- (Philippines) Ato Agustin
- (Philippines) Dayong Mendoza
- (Philippines) Biboy Ravanes
- (United States) Chris Ross
- (Philippines) Boyzie Zamar
- (Philippines) Jorge Gallent (consultant)

Team manager

- (Philippines) Gee Abanilla
- (Philippines) Daniel Henares (assistant)

Legend

- (C) Team captain
- (CI) Commissioner's Cup Import
- (GI) Governors' Cup Import
- (EI) EASL Import
- (DP) Unsigned draft pick
- (FA) Free agent
- (IN) Inactive
- (S) Suspended
- (R) Rookie
- Injured

Roster

== Philippine Cup ==
=== Eliminations ===
==== Standings ====
Pos	Team	W	L	PCT	GB	Qualification
1	San Miguel Beermen	9	2	.818	—	Twice-to-beat in the quarterfinals
2	Rain or Shine Elasto Painters	8	3	.727 (Note: Head-to-head record: Rain or Shine 1–0 TNT)	1	Twice-to-beat in the quarterfinals
3	TNT Tropang 5G	8	3	.727	1	Twice-to-beat in the quarterfinals
4	Converge FiberXers	7	4	.636 (Note: Head-to-head record: Converge 1–0 Barangay Ginebra)	2	Twice-to-beat in the quarterfinals
5	Barangay Ginebra San Miguel	7	4	.636	2	Twice-to-win in the quarterfinals
6	Magnolia Chicken Timplados Hotshots	6	5	.545 (Note: Head-to-head quotient: Magnolia 1.09, Meralco 0.99, NLEX 0.93)	3	Twice-to-win in the quarterfinals
7	Meralco Bolts	6	5	.545	3	Twice-to-win in the quarterfinals
8	NLEX Road Warriors	6	5	.545	3	Twice-to-win in the quarterfinals
9	Titan Ultra Giant Risers	4	7	.364	5	
10	Phoenix Fuel Masters	3	8	.273	6	
11	Blackwater Bossing	1	10	.091 (Note: Head-to-head record: Blackwater 1–0 Terrafirma)	8	
12	Terrafirma Dyip	1	10	.091	8	

Source: PBA.ph
Rules for classification: 1) winning percentage; 2) head-to-head goal average (quotient); 3) head-to-head record; 4) overall quotient; 5) coin toss

==== Game log ====
2025–26 PBA Philippine Cup game log
Total: 9–2
October: 2–2

Game	Date	Opponent	Score	High points	High rebounds	High assists	Location Attendance	Record
1	October 8, 2025	NLEX	L 84–85	June Mar Fajardo (18)	June Mar Fajardo (15)	Don Trollano (5)	Ynares Center Antipolo	0–1
2	October 12, 2025	Phoenix	L 103–109	June Mar Fajardo (19)	June Mar Fajardo (22)	Jericho Cruz (7)	Ynares Center Antipolo	0–2
3	October 19, 2025	Rain or Shine	W 111–93	CJ Perez (23)	June Mar Fajardo (14)	Fajardo, Perez, Tiongson (4)	Ynares Center Montalban	1–2
4	October 26, 2025	Barangay Ginebra	W 83–81	June Mar Fajardo (17)	June Mar Fajardo (16)	June Mar Fajardo (5)	Coca-Cola Arena	2–2

November: 3–0

Game	Date	Opponent	Score	High points	High rebounds	High assists	Location Attendance	Record
5	November 2, 2025	Converge	W 96–90	June Mar Fajardo (24)	June Mar Fajardo (16)	CJ Perez (5)	Ynares Center Antipolo	3–2
6	November 7, 2025	Magnolia	W 94–92	Don Trollano (29)	June Mar Fajardo (9)	Chris Ross (5)	Ynares Center Montalban	4–2
7	November 12, 2025	Titan Ultra	W 158–117	CJ Perez (26)	Moala Tautuaa (13)	June Mar Fajardo (10)	Ynares Center Montalban	5–2

December: 4–0

Game	Date	Opponent	Score	High points	High rebounds	High assists	Location Attendance	Record
8	December 5, 2025	TNT	W 110–95	CJ Perez (33)	June Mar Fajardo (17)	Cruz, Perez, Ross, Tiongson (3)	Ynares Center Antipolo	6–2
9	December 13, 2025	Blackwater	W 116–92	Don Trollano (22)	June Mar Fajardo (12)	June Mar Fajardo (6)	Ynares Center Antipolo	7–2
10	December 17, 2025	Terrafirma	W 135–115	CJ Perez (26)	June Mar Fajardo (13)	June Mar Fajardo (10)	Ninoy Aquino Stadium	8–2
11	December 19, 2025	Meralco	W 113–104	Fajardo, Perez (24)	June Mar Fajardo (15)	Fajardo, Perez (4)	Ninoy Aquino Stadium	9–2

=== Playoffs ===
==== Bracket ====
Quarterfinals (Top 4 twice-to-beat)
1	San Miguel	101
8	NLEX	94
4	Converge	85	98
5	Barangay Ginebra	105	99*
2	Rain or Shine	79	89
7	Meralco	96	98
3	TNT	118
6	Magnolia	109

Semifinals (Best-of-7)
1	San Miguel	4
5	Barangay Ginebra	2
7	Meralco	1
3	TNT	4

Finals (Best-of-7)
1	San Miguel	4
3	TNT	2

*Game went into overtime

==== Game log ====
2025–26 PBA Philippine Cup playoffs game log
Total: 9–4
Quarterfinals: 1–0

Game	Date	Opponent	Score	High points	High rebounds	High assists	Location Attendance	Series
1	December 25, 2025	NLEX	W 101–94	June Mar Fajardo (26)	June Mar Fajardo (23)	June Mar Fajardo (6)	Smart Araneta Coliseum	1–0

Semifinals: 4–2

Game	Date	Opponent	Score	High points	High rebounds	High assists	Location Attendance	Series
1	January 4, 2026	Barangay Ginebra	L 90–99	June Mar Fajardo (27)	June Mar Fajardo (23)	Chris Ross (5)	Smart Araneta Coliseum	0–1
2	January 7, 2026	Barangay Ginebra	W 93–84	June Mar Fajardo (21)	June Mar Fajardo (23)	Moala Tautuaa (4)	Smart Araneta Coliseum	1–1
3	January 9, 2026	Barangay Ginebra	W 91–85	Don Trollano (33)	June Mar Fajardo (19)	Chris Ross (8)	Smart Araneta Coliseum	2–1
4	January 11, 2026	Barangay Ginebra	L 91–105	CJ Perez (22)	June Mar Fajardo (20)	June Mar Fajardo (5)	SM Mall of Asia Arena	2–2
5	January 14, 2026	Barangay Ginebra	W 115–109	June Mar Fajardo (21)	June Mar Fajardo (11)	Chris Ross (8)	Smart Araneta Coliseum	3–2
6	January 16, 2026	Barangay Ginebra	W 101–88	CJ Perez (41)	June Mar Fajardo (18)	Cruz, Lassiter, Ross (4)	Smart Araneta Coliseum	4–2

Finals: 4–2

Game	Date	Opponent	Score	High points	High rebounds	High assists	Location Attendance	Series
1	January 21, 2026	TNT	L 91–96	June Mar Fajardo (24)	June Mar Fajardo (17)	CJ Perez (6)	Ynares Center Antipolo	0–1
2	January 23, 2026	TNT	W 111–92	Don Trollano (22)	June Mar Fajardo (16)	CJ Perez (5)	Ynares Center Antipolo	1–1
3	January 25, 2026	TNT	W 95–89	CJ Perez (20)	June Mar Fajardo (27)	CJ Perez (4)	SM Mall of Asia Arena	2–1
4	January 28, 2026	TNT	L 87–110	June Mar Fajardo (18)	June Mar Fajardo (16)	CJ Perez (4)	SM Mall of Asia Arena	2–2
5	January 30, 2026	TNT	W 96–82	Rodney Brondial (17)	Rodney Brondial (15)	Moala Tautuaa (7)	Ynares Center Antipolo	3–2
6	February 1, 2026	TNT	W 92–77	June Mar Fajardo (29)	June Mar Fajardo (23)	CJ Perez (7)	SM Mall of Asia Arena; 14,201	4–2

== Commissioner's Cup ==
=== Eliminations ===
==== Standings ====
Pos	Team	W	L	PCT	GB	Qualification
1	NLEX Road Warriors	10	2	.833	—	Twice-to-beat in the quarterfinals
2	Barangay Ginebra San Miguel	9	3	.750 (Note: Head-to-head record: Barangay Ginebra 1–0 Rain or Shine)	1	Twice-to-beat in the quarterfinals
3	Rain or Shine Elasto Painters	9	3	.750	1	Twice-to-beat in the quarterfinals
4	Meralco Bolts	8	4	.667	2	Twice-to-beat in the quarterfinals
5	Magnolia Chicken Timplados Hotshots	7	5	.583 (Note: Head-to-head record: Magnolia 1–0 San Miguel)	3	Twice-to-win in the quarterfinals
6	San Miguel Beermen	7	5	.583	3	Twice-to-win in the quarterfinals
7	Phoenix Super LPG Fuel Masters	6	6	.500 (Note: Head-to-head record: Phoenix Super LPG 1–0 TNT)	4	Twice-to-win in the quarterfinals
8	TNT Tropang 5G	6	6	.500	4	Twice-to-win in the quarterfinals
9	Converge FiberXers	5	7	.417	5	
10	Terrafirma Dyip	4	8	.333	6	
11	Macau Black Knights (G)	3	9	.250	7	
12	Titan Ultra Giant Risers	2	10	.167 (Note: Head-to-head record: Titan Ultra 1–0 Blackwater)	8	
13	Blackwater Bossing	2	10	.167	8	

Source: PBA.ph
Rules for classification: 1) winning percentage; 2) head-to-head goal average (quotient); 3) head-to-head record; 4) overall quotient; 5) coin toss
(G) Guests

==== Game log ====
2026 PBA Commissioner's Cup game log
Total: 7–5
March: 2–2

Game	Date	Opponent	Score	High points	High rebounds	High assists	Location Attendance	Record
1	March 21, 2026	Titan Ultra	L 112–119	CJ Perez (27)	June Mar Fajardo (17)	Perez, Rosales (7)	Ynares Center Antipolo	0–1
2	March 25, 2026	Converge	W 103–99	June Mar Fajardo (27)	June Mar Fajardo (17)	Marcus Lee (6)	Ynares Center Antipolo	1–1
3	March 28, 2026	TNT	L 92–118	Marcus Lee (30)	June Mar Fajardo (20)	CJ Perez (4)	Smart Araneta Coliseum	1–2
4	March 31, 2026	Macau	W 110–94	CJ Perez (26)	Justin Patton (17)	June Mar Fajardo (6)	Ninoy Aquino Stadium	2–2

April: 3–3

Game	Date	Opponent	Score	High points	High rebounds	High assists	Location Attendance	Record
5	April 5, 2026	Barangay Ginebra	W 85–82	CJ Perez (20)	Justin Patton (17)	Jericho Cruz (4)	Smart Araneta Coliseum	3–2
6	April 8, 2026	Rain or Shine	L 112–116	Marcio Lassiter (27)	Justin Patton (17)	CJ Perez (5)	Ninoy Aquino Stadium	3–3
7	April 12, 2026	Magnolia	L 101–120	CJ Perez (23)	Rodney Brondial (9)	CJ Perez (5)	Smart Araneta Coliseum	3–4
8	April 19, 2026	NLEX	W 98–94	Bennie Boatwright (41)	Boatwright, Fajardo (11)	Chris Ross (6)	Ynares Center Antipolo	4–4
9	April 22, 2026	Blackwater	L 120–126	Bennie Boatwright (38)	Boatwright, Fajardo (13)	Boatwright, Perez, Ross (6)	Ninoy Aquino Stadium	4–5
10	April 28, 2026	Meralco	W 103–92	June Mar Fajardo (19)	June Mar Fajardo (17)	Bennie Boatwright (4)	Ninoy Aquino Stadium	5–5

May: 2–0

Game	Date	Opponent	Score	High points	High rebounds	High assists	Location Attendance	Record
11	May 6, 2026	Terrafirma	W 126–110	Bennie Boatwright (33)	June Mar Fajardo (16)	Bennie Boatwright (7)	Ninoy Aquino Stadium	6–5
12	May 9, 2026	Phoenix Super LPG	W 116–104	Bennie Boatwright (34)	June Mar Fajardo (16)	Bennie Boatwright (5)	Ynares Center Antipolo	7–5

=== Playoffs ===
==== Bracket ====
Quarterfinals (Top 4 twice-to-beat)
1	NLEX	93	112
8	TNT	96	118
4	Meralco	89	105
5	Magnolia	95	102*
2	Barangay Ginebra	112
7	Phoenix Super LPG	81
3	Rain or Shine	113
6	San Miguel	104

Semifinals (Best-of-7)
8	TNT	4
4	Meralco	2
2	Barangay Ginebra	4
3	Rain or Shine	2

Finals (Best-of-7)
8	TNT	3
2	Barangay Ginebra	4

*Game went into overtime

==== Game log ====
2026 PBA Commissioner's Cup playoffs game log
Total: 0–1
Quarterfinals: 0–1

Game	Date	Opponent	Score	High points	High rebounds	High assists	Location Attendance	Series
1	May 15, 2026	Rain or Shine	L 104–113	Bennie Boatwright (24)	June Mar Fajardo (12)	CJ Perez (5)	Ynares Center Antipolo	0–1

== Governors' Cup ==
=== Eliminations ===
==== Standings ====
Pos	Team	W	L	PCT	GB	Qualification
1	NLEX Road Warriors	9	3	.750 (Note: Head-to-head quotient: NLEX 1.05, San Miguel 0.95)	—	Quarterfinals
2	San Miguel Beermen	9	3	.750	—	Quarterfinals
3	Converge FiberXers	8	4	.667	1	Quarterfinals
4	TNT Tropang 5G	7	5	.583	2	Quarterfinals
5	Terrafirma Dyip	5	7	.417	4	
6	Macau Giant Pandas (G)	2	10	.167 (Note: Head-to-head quotient: Macau 1.01, Titan Ultra 0.99)	7	
7	Titan Ultra Giant Risers	2	10	.167	7	

Source: PBA.ph
Rules for classification: 1) winning percentage; 2) head-to-head quotient (goal average); 3) head-to-head record; 4) coin toss
(G) Guests

==== Game log ====
2026 PBA Governors' Cup game log
Total: 9–3
July: 4–1

Game	Date	Opponent	Score	High points	High rebounds	High assists	Location Attendance	Record
1	July 14, 2026	Macau	W 123–109	George King (30)	Rodney Brondial (25)	Brondial, King (7)	Ynares Center Antipolo	1–0
2	July 18, 2026	Terrafirma	W 109–104	George King (37)	George King (14)	Jerrick Ahanmisi (6)	Ynares Center Antipolo	2–0
3	July 22, 2026	Converge	W 128–122	George King (41)	George King (11)	Jerrick Ahanmisi (6)	Ynares Center Antipolo	3–0
4	July 26, 2026	NLEX	L 96–110	George King (31)	George King (8)	Jerrick Ahanmisi (5)	Smart Araneta Coliseum	3–1
5	July 29, 2026	Titan Ultra	W 143–105	George King (35)	George King (8)	Cruz, King (8)	Ninoy Aquino Stadium	4–1

August: 3–1

Game	Date	Opponent	Score	High points	High rebounds	High assists	Location Attendance	Record
6	August 1, 2026	TNT	L 89–93 (OT)	George King (35)	George King (16)	Chris Ross (3)	SM Mall of Asia Arena	4–2
7	August 5, 2026	Converge	W 126–114	George King (46)	June Mar Fajardo (21)	June Mar Fajardo (10)	Smart Araneta Coliseum	5–2
8	August 8, 2026	Macau	W 131–79	George King (19)	June Mar Fajardo (11)	Ross, Trollano (6)	Ynares Center Montalban	6–2
9	August 12, 2026	Titan Ultra	W 143–113	George King (39)	Rodney Brondial (17)	Chris Ross (8)	Ynares Center Antipolo	7–2

October: 2–1

Game	Date	Opponent	Score	High points	High rebounds	High assists	Location Attendance	Record
10	October 10, 2026	TNT	L 98–116	CJ Perez (21)	June Mar Fajardo (18)	George King (6)	Ynares Center Antipolo	7–3
11	October 14, 2026	Terrafirma	W 135–105	George King (44)	June Mar Fajardo (12)	Cruz, Hernandez, King (5)	Ninoy Aquino Stadium	8–3
12	October 21, 2026	NLEX	W 135–133	George King (27)	Fajardo, Trollano (10)	Chris Ross (7)	Ynares Center Antipolo	9–3

=== Playoffs ===
==== Bracket ====
Quarterfinals (Best-of-5)
A1	NLEX	3
B4	Phoenix Super LPG	0
B2	Rain or Shine	1
A3	Converge	3
B1	Magnolia	0
A4	TNT	3
A2	San Miguel	2
B3	Barangay Ginebra	3

Semifinals (Best-of-5)
A1	NLEX	0
A3	Converge	0
A4	TNT	0
B3	Barangay Ginebra	0

Finals (Best-of-7)
A
B

==== Game log ====
2026 PBA Governors' Cup playoffs game log
Total: 2–3
Quarterfinals: 2–3

Game	Date	Opponent	Score	High points	High rebounds	High assists	Location Attendance	Series
1	October 27, 2026	Barangay Ginebra	L 95–104	Perez, Trollano (21)	Brondial, Fajardo (10)	CJ Perez (4)	Smart Araneta Coliseum	0–1
2	October 30, 2026	Barangay Ginebra	L 99–126	CJ Perez (18)	June Mar Fajardo (9)	King, Perez (3)	Ninoy Aquino Stadium	0–2
3	November 3, 2026	Barangay Ginebra	W 101–98	George King (21)	June Mar Fajardo (13)	Chris Ross (6)	Dasmariñas Arena	1–2
4	November 6, 2026	Barangay Ginebra	W 108–102	George King (35)	George King (15)	Chris Ross (9)	Smart Araneta Coliseum	2–2
5	November 10, 2026	Barangay Ginebra	L 94–110	George King (31)	June Mar Fajardo (16)	CJ Perez (4)	Ynares Center Antipolo	2–3

== Transactions ==
=== Free agency ===
==== Signings ====
Player	Date signed	Contract amount	Contract length	Former team	Ref.
Andreas Cahilig	February 23, 2026	Not disclosed	2 years	Re-signed	
JM Calma	June 14, 2026	Not disclosed	2 years	Re-signed	
Jerrick Ahanmisi	September 23, 2026	Not disclosed	3 years	Re-signed	

=== Trades ===
==== Commissioner's Cup ====
June 2026
June 3, 2026	To San Miguel Jerrick Ahanmisi; Paolo Hernandez	To Terrafirma Chris Miller; Juami Tiongson; 2028 (S52) San Miguel first-round pick

=== Recruited imports ===
Tournament	Name	Debuted	Last game	Record	Ref.
Commissioner's Cup	Marcus Lee	March 21, 2026 (vs. Titan Ultra)	March 28, 2026 (vs. TNT)	1–2	
Commissioner's Cup	Justin Patton	March 31, 2026 (vs. Macau)	April 8, 2026 (vs. Rain or Shine)	2–1	
Commissioner's Cup	Bennie Boatwright	April 19, 2026 (vs. NLEX)	May 15, 2026 (vs. Rain or Shine)	4–2	
Governors' Cup	George King	July 14, 2026 (vs. Macau)	November 10, 2026 (vs. Barangay Ginebra)	11–6	
