= Jerrick Ahanmisi =

Filipino-Nigerian basketball player

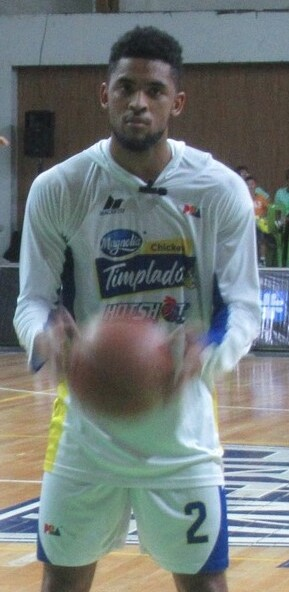
- Ahanmisi in 2023

No. 7 – San Miguel Beermen
- Position: Shooting guard
- League: PBA

Personal information
- Born: October 16, 1997 (age 29) California, U.S.
- Listed height: 6 ft 1 in (1.85 m)
- Listed weight: 185 lb (84 kg)

Career information
- High school: Village Christian (Sun Valley, California)
- College: Adamson
- PBA draft: 2020: 1st round, 10th overall pick
- Drafted by: Magnolia Hotshots Pambansang Manok
- Playing career: 2021–present

Career history
- 2021–2025: Magnolia Pambansang Manok Hotshots / Magnolia Chicken Timplados Hotshots
- 2025–2026: Terrafirma Dyip
- 2026–present: San Miguel Beermen

Career highlights
- UAAP Mythical Team (2018); PBA All-Star Week Obstacle Challenge (Guard) champion (2026); PBA Three-Point Shootout champion (2026)

Jerrick Vincent Frankera Ahanmisi (born October 16, 1997) is a Filipino professional basketball player for the San Miguel Beermen of the Philippine Basketball Association (PBA).

Jerrick Ahanmisi was born to nurses. His father Victor Ahanmisi is Nigerian while his mother Marissa Frankera is a Filipina from Pampanga who emigrated to the United States in her teenage years.

Ahanmisi played four years of high school basketball for Village Christian School in Sun Valley, Los Angeles, California. He played college ball at the Adamson Soaring Falcons of the University Athletic Association of the Philippines (UAAP), which awarded him with Mythical Team honors in 2018 in his third season. He followed his older brother Maverick Ahanmisi in the professional league in 2021, playing for the Magnolia Hotshots in the PBA.

In May 2023, Ahanmisi signed a two-year contract extension with Magnolia.

A known sharpshooter since his Adamson days, Ahanmisi was the first player to hit back-to-back four-pointers and three four-pointers in a single PBA game.

Ahanmisi was named as part of the Philippine national 3x3 team for the 2026 FIBA 3x3 Asia Cup.

On June 3, 2026, Ahanmisi, along with Paolo Hernandez, was traded to the San Miguel Beermen in exchange for Chris Miller, Juami Tiongson and 2028 San Miguel's second-round pick.

== PBA career statistics ==
Legend
| GP | Games played | MPG | Minutes per game | FG% | Field-goal percentage |
| 3FG% | 3-point field-goal percentage | 4P% | 4-point field-goal percentage | FT% | Free-throw percentage |
| RPG | Rebounds per game | APG | Assists per game | SPG | Steals per game |
| BPG | Blocks per game | PPG | Points per game | 127 | Career high |

As of the end of 2025–26 season

=== Season-by-season averages ===
| Year | Team | GP | MPG | FG% | 3P% | 4P% | FT% | RPG | APG | SPG | BPG | PPG |
|---|---|---|---|---|---|---|---|---|---|---|---|---|
| 2021 | Magnolia | 36 | 13.3 | .347 | .327 | — | .750 | 1.0 | .6 | .1 | .0 | 4.3 |
| 2022–23 | Magnolia | 33 | 10.0 | .391 | .360 | — | 1.000 | .7 | .6 | .3 | .1 | 4.1 |
| 2023–24 | Magnolia | 18 | 10.7 | .262 | .255 | — | .714 | 1.4 | .6 | .2 | .1 | 2.8 |
| 2024–25 | Magnolia | 33 | 15.3 | .384 | .305 | .389 | .727 | 1.8 | .9 | .3 | .0 | 6.8 |
| 2025–26 | Terrafirma | 39 | 30.1 | .417 | .362 | .257 | .833 | 3.0 | 2.9 | 1.0 | .1 | 14.5 |
| 2025–26 | San Miguel | 39 | 30.1 | .417 | .362 | .257 | .833 | 3.0 | 2.9 | 1.0 | .1 | 14.5 |
| Career | | 159 | 16.8 | .387 | .337 | .311 | .798 | 1.7 | 1.2 | .4 | .1 | 7.1 |
