= Ynares Center =

Public indoor arena in Antipolo, Rizal, Philippines

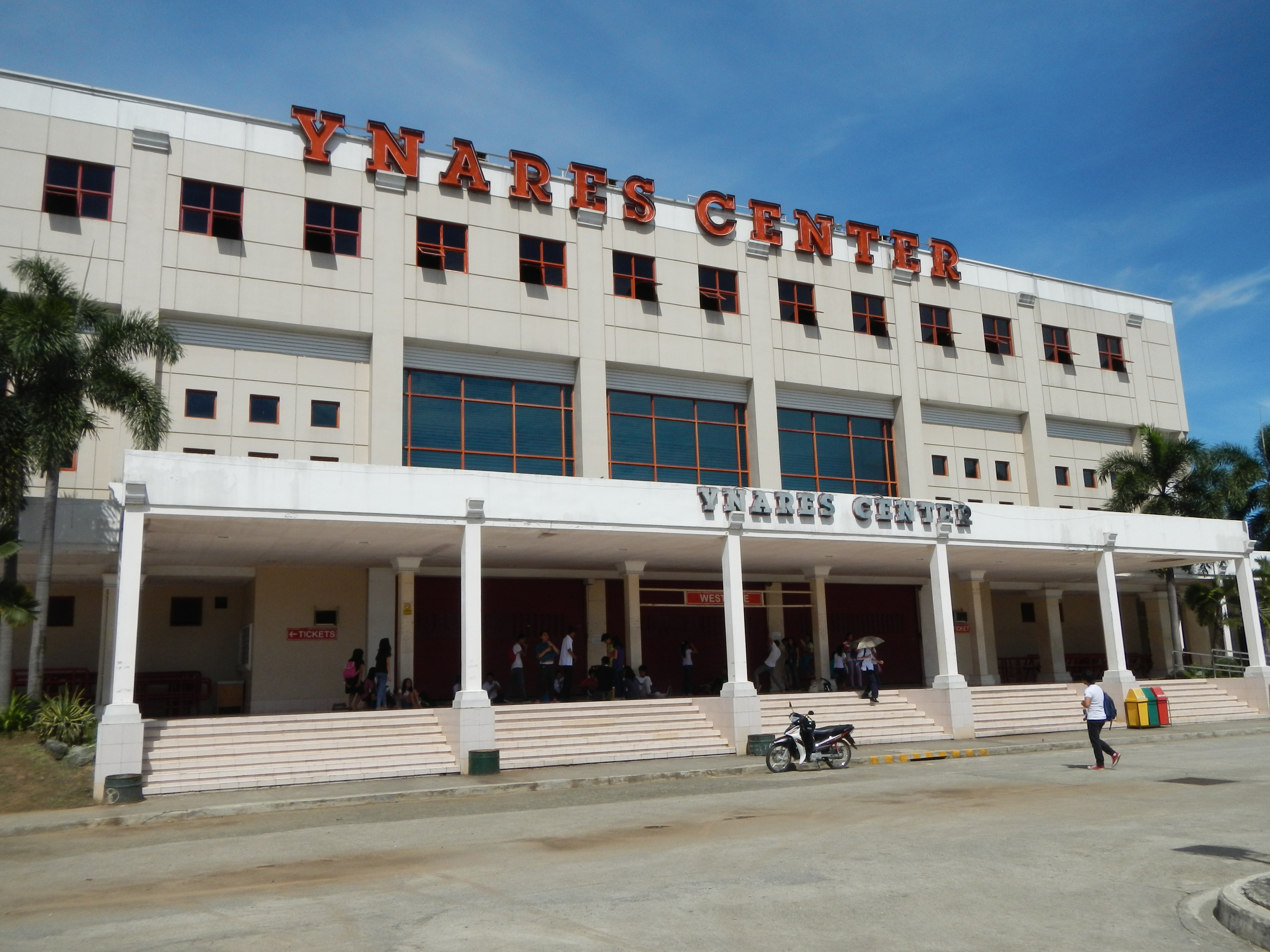
- Interactive map of Ynares Center
- Location: Antipolo, Rizal, Philippines
- Coordinates: 14°35′7.7″N 121°10′14.2″E
- Owner: Rizal Provincial Government
- Operator: Rizal Provincial Government
- Capacity: 7,400
- Parking: 440 slots

Construction
- Groundbreaking: 1990s
- Opened: 2000
- Cost: ₱350 million

Tenants
- PBA (2001–present); Pasig-Rizal Pirates (MBA) (2000); UAAP (2018–2019); Rizal Golden Coolers (MPBL) (2018–2024); Philippine Super Liga (2019); Rizal St. Gerrard Charity Foundation (MPVA) (2023–2024)

The Ynares Center, also known as Ynares Center Antipolo, is an indoor arena located along the Circumferential Road in Antipolo, Rizal, Philippines. The facility, which has a seating capacity of 7,400, is managed by the Provincial Government of Rizal. The arena is named after the Ynares family, a political dynasty in Rizal, whose members had served as governors since 1992. It was also the site of the 100th Foundation Anniversary Celebration of the province.

The arena, built at a cost of ₱350 million, is situated in a 50,000 square meters (540,000 sq ft) lot. The arena comes with an air conditioning system with 13 multi-purpose rooms, which includes the Offices of the Governor and Sangguniang Panlalawigan, Administration and Engineering and Equipment Room. Its also host a parking area with 440 slots.

In 2024, the arena underwent a renovation, which includes a new scoreboard and a court with a permanent four-point line to accommodate rule changes set by the Philippine Basketball Association during its 2024–25 season.

In March 4. 2025, a second Ynares Center opened in the nearby municipality of Rodriguez.

== Events ==
In June 2000, as part of the Jubilee Year celebration of the Catholic Church, the Diocese of Antipolo offered Mass at the center with Cardinal Jaime Sin, Archbishop of Manila, and Archbishop Antonio Franco, Apostolic Nuncio to the Philippines, who was then making a pastoral visit to the diocese. Mass was again offered at the center in 2005 to celebrate the National Eucharistic and Marian Year. The center was also the venue for a congress held in celebration of the same season. Former president Corazon Aquino and Bishop Teodoro Bacani were the main speakers. In 2007, the Diocese of Antipolo held a well-attended concert of its priests in the center. On December 5, 2008, the center was again the venue of a Mass and program celebrating the 25th anniversary of the canonical erection of the Diocese of Antipolo.

It has hosted various international events, such as the 2011 FIBA Asia Champions Cup. In late 2000, Manny Pacquiao won in 10 rounds against Nedal Hussein in an international title bout prior to his first match in the United States a few months later.

Aside from hosting basketball, boxing, volleyball and other indoor sports, the Ynares Center is also used for concerts and other crowd gatherings.

Ynares Center is also the home of school pageants and school celebrations. Every year, Our Lady of Fatima University holds its founding anniversary there. Every year, schools in Antipolo compete in the Drum and Lyre Competition held usually in December.

== Tenants ==
Aside from hosting PBA games, which it has done since 2000, and serves as the home arena of the Rizal Golden Coolers of the Maharlika Pilipinas Basketball League from 2018 to 2024 but since 2025 Rizal Golden Coolers of the Maharlika Pilipinas Basketball League move their home arena in Ynares Center Montalban It was also the home arena of the Pasig-Rizal Pirates of the now-defunct Metropolitan Basketball Association in 2000.

Preceded by first venue	Home of the Rizal Golden Coolers; 2018–present	Succeeded by current
