= Ynares Center (Rodriguez, Rizal) =

Indoor arena in Rodriguez, Rizal, Philippines

Ynares Center Montalban
- Ynares Center II
- Inside at the arena during the inauguration ceremony last March 2025
- Interactive map of Ynares Center Montalban
- Location: Rodriguez (Montalban), Rizal, Philippines
- Coordinates: 14°43′25″N 121°08′38″E
- Capacity: 6,000

Construction
- Opened: March 4, 2025

Tenants
- Philippine Basketball Association; Premier Volleyball League; Rizal Golden Coolers (MPBL) (2025–present)

The Ynares Center II, also called Ynares Center Montalban, is an indoor arena located in Rodriguez (Montalban), Rizal, Philippines. The arena opened in 2025 and is the second arena to bear the Ynares Center name, after the arena in Antipolo. The arena hosts Philippine Basketball Association games and is also home to the Rizal Golden Coolers of the Maharlika Pilipinas Basketball League (MPBL).

== History ==
The Ynares Center II in Rodriguez (Montalban), Rizal was inaugurated on March 4, 2025.

== Tenants ==
The Maharlika Pilipinas Basketball League hosted its first gameday in Montalban with a tripleheader on April 1, 2025. In the final game, the hometown Rizal Golden Coolers defeated the Mindoro Tamaraws, 77–61.

The Philippine Basketball Association played its first games at the arena during the 2025 PBA Philippine Cup on May 2, 2025 with a doubleheader. The NLEX Road Warriors won the league's first game in Montalban with a win over the Blackwater Bossing. This is then followed by the Phoenix Fuel Masters beating the TNT Tropang 5G in the second game.

The Premier Volleyball League played its first games at the arena during its preseason PVL on Tour in 2025 with a series of four games featuring the Akari Chargers, Capital1 Solar Spikers, Chery Tiggo Crossovers, and Zus Coffee Thunderbelles.
