= List of current PBA team rosters =

This is a list of current Philippine Basketball Association team rosters.

Flags denote the player's place of birth.

== Barangay Ginebra San Miguel ==
Barangay Ginebra San Miguel roster
Players
Coaches

Pos.	#	POB	Name	Height	Weight	DOB (YYYY–MM–DD)	From
F/C	1	(Philippines)	Troy Rosario	6 ft 7 in (2.01 m)	218 lb (99 kg)	1992–01–20	National-U
G/F	2	(United States)	Jeremiah Gray	6 ft 5 in (1.96 m)	205 lb (93 kg)	1996–08–16	Dominican (CA)
G	4	(Philippines)	RJ Abarrientos	5 ft 11 in (1.80 m)	174 lb (79 kg)	1999–09–14	Far Eastern
G	9	(Philippines)	Scottie Thompson	6 ft 1 in (1.85 m)	180 lb (82 kg)	1993–07–12	UPHSD
G	10	(Philippines)	John Pinto	5 ft 11 in (1.80 m)	170 lb (77 kg)	1990–10–15	Arellano
F/C	11	(Philippines)	Isaac Go	6 ft 7 in (2.01 m)	230 lb (104 kg)	1996–06–07	Ateneo
G/F	14	(United States)	Stephen Holt	6 ft 4 in (1.93 m)	195 lb (88 kg)	1991–12–06	Saint Mary's
F	18	(Philippines)	Ralph Cu	6 ft 4 in (1.93 m)	210 lb (95 kg)	1997–03–08	De La Salle
F	22	(Philippines)	John Abis (R)	6 ft 3 in (1.91 m)	209 lb (95 kg)	2000–10–14	UPHSD
F/C	23	(Philippines)	Raymond Aguilar	6 ft 4 in (1.93 m)	200 lb (91 kg)	1985–07–27	National-U
G/F	24	(Philippines)	Jayson David	6 ft 3 in (1.91 m)	191 lb (87 kg)	1996–11–08	Lyceum
C	25	(Philippines)	Japeth Aguilar	6 ft 9 in (2.06 m)	235 lb (107 kg)	1987–01–25	Western Kentucky
F/C	29	(Canada)	Norbert Torres	6 ft 6 in (1.98 m)	250 lb (113 kg)	1990–01–12	De La Salle
F	32	(United States)	Justin Brownlee (CI)	6 ft 6 in (1.98 m)	220 lb (100 kg)	1988–04–23	St. John's
F/C	33	(Philippines)	Kemark Cariño (injured)	6 ft 9 in (2.06 m)	203 lb (92 kg)	1998–02–01	San Beda
F	34	(Philippines)	Sonny Estil (R)	6 ft 3 in (1.91 m)		2001–06–28	Letran

Head coach

- (United States) Tim Cone

Assistant coach(es)

- (Philippines) Richard del Rosario (1st assistant)
- (Philippines) Johnny Abarrientos
- (Philippines) Jamil Lipae
- (Philippines) Patrick Partosa
- (Philippines) Olsen Racela

Team manager

- (Philippines) Alfrancis Chua^{[a]}
- (Philippines) Raymond Rodriguez (assistant)

Legend

- (C) Team captain
- (CI) Commissioner's Cup Import
- (GI) Governors' Cup Import
- (EI) EASL Import
- (DP) Unsigned draft pick
- (FA) Free agent
- (IN) Inactive
- (S) Suspended
- (R) Rookie
- Injured

Roster

- ^{a} Also serves as Barangay Ginebra's board governor.

== Blackwater Bossing ==
Blackwater Bossing roster
Players
Coaches

Pos.	#	POB	Name	Height	Weight	DOB (YYYY–MM–DD)	From
F/C	1	(Philippines)	Abu Tratter	6 ft 5 in (1.96 m)	215 lb (98 kg)	1993–01–09	De La Salle
G	2	(United States)	Sedrick Barefield	6 ft 2 in (1.88 m)	190 lb (86 kg)	1996–11–18	Utah
F	4	(United States)	David Murrell	6 ft 4 in (1.93 m)	195 lb (88 kg)	1996–11–08	UP Diliman
G	5	(Philippines)	Paul Zamar	5 ft 10 in (1.78 m)	179 lb (81 kg)	1987–10–20	UE
F/C	8	(Philippines)	Bradwyn Guinto	6 ft 6 in (1.98 m)	220 lb (100 kg)	1991–10–20	San Sebastian
G	9	(Italy)	Dalph Panopio (R)	6 ft 1 in (1.85 m)	180 lb (82 kg)	2000–06–10	Cal State Bakersfield
G/F	10	(Hong Kong)	BJ Andrade	6 ft 1 in (1.85 m)	180 lb (82 kg)	1996–07–26	Ateneo
G	12	(Philippines)	Jack Cruz-Dumont (R)	6 ft 4 in (1.93 m)		2000–10–14	UE
C	13	(Philippines)	Clifford Jopia	6 ft 8 in (2.03 m)	220 lb (100 kg)	1998–05–11	San Beda
F	14	(Philippines)	Troy Mallillin	6 ft 4 in (1.93 m)	190 lb (86 kg)	1999–01–04	Ateneo
G	16	(Philippines)	RK Ilagan (injured)	5 ft 7 in (1.70 m)	150 lb (68 kg)	1997–04–03	San Sebastian
F	19	(Philippines)	James Una (R)	6 ft 5 in (1.96 m)		2001–03–19	San Sebastian
F	23	(Philippines)	Richard Escoto	6 ft 3 in (1.91 m)	204 lb (93 kg)	1997–03–21	Far Eastern
F	25	(Canada)	Christian David	6 ft 6 in (1.98 m)	215 lb (98 kg)	1998–06–19	Butler
G	26	(Philippines)	Jed Mendoza	5 ft 10 in (1.78 m)	160 lb (73 kg)	1996–06–21	UE
C	32	(United States)	Daniel Ochefu (CI)	6 ft 11 in (2.11 m)	244 lb (111 kg)	1993–12–15	Villanova
F/C	–	(Philippines)	Ximone Sandagon (injured) (R)	6 ft 4 in (1.93 m)		1999–03–10	Far Eastern
G/F	–	(Philippines)	Jaydee Tungcab (injured)	6 ft 3 in (1.91 m)	196 lb (89 kg)	1997–05–05	Philippines

Head coach

- (United States) Jeffrey Cariaso

Assistant coach(es)

- (Philippines) Joe Silva (1st assistant)
- (Philippines) Junjie Ablan
- (Philippines) Ryan Alba
- (Philippines) Patrick Aquino
- (United States) Mike Cortez
- (Philippines) Aries Dimaunahan
- (Philippines) John Ferriols
- (Philippines) Daniel Olan

Team manager

- (Philippines) Johnson Martinez
- (Philippines) Rhona Tibor (assistant)

Legend

- (C) Team captain
- (CI) Commissioner's Cup Import
- (GI) Governors' Cup Import
- (EI) EASL Import
- (DP) Unsigned draft pick
- (FA) Free agent
- (IN) Inactive
- (S) Suspended
- (R) Rookie
- Injured

Roster

== Converge FiberXers ==
Converge FiberXers roster
Players
Coaches

Pos.	#	POB	Name	Height	Weight	DOB (YYYY–MM–DD)	From
G	1	(Philippines)	Juan Gómez de Liaño (R)	6 ft 0 in (1.83 m)	163 lb (74 kg)	1999–11–19	Philippines
G/F	2	(Philippines)	Archie Concepcion	6 ft 2 in (1.88 m)	189 lb (86 kg)	1996–05–18	Arellano
C	7	(United States)	Kylor Kelley (CI)	7 ft 0 in (2.13 m)	230 lb (104 kg)	1997–08–31	Oregon State
F	8	(Philippines)	Calvin Abueva	6 ft 3 in (1.91 m)	209 lb (95 kg)	1988–02–04	San Sebastian
G/F	9	(Philippines)	John Lloyd Clemente (R)	6 ft 3 in (1.91 m)	176 lb (80 kg)	1998–07–15	National-U
G	10	(United States)	Mikey Williams	6 ft 2 in (1.88 m)	190 lb (86 kg)	1991–10–27	Cal State Fullerton
G	11	(Philippines)	MJ Garcia	6 ft 0 in (1.83 m)		1998–11–25	SPCF
G	12	(United States)	Alec Stockton	6 ft 2 in (1.88 m)	170 lb (77 kg)	1998–06–24	Far Eastern
G	13	(Philippines)	Kurt Reyson	5 ft 10 in (1.78 m)		1998–09–08	Letran
C	15	(Philippines)	Justin Arana	6 ft 7 in (2.01 m)	231 lb (105 kg)	1999–03–21	Arellano
F	16	(Philippines)	Jonnel Policarpio	6 ft 5 in (1.96 m)		2001–12–16	De La Salle
F/C	19	(Philippines)	Justine Baltazar	6 ft 9 in (2.06 m)	250 lb (113 kg)	1997–02–19	De La Salle
C	20	(Philippines)	Larry Muyang	6 ft 6 in (1.98 m)	220 lb (100 kg)	1995–06–04	Letran
F/C	21	(Philippines)	Jhaymo Eguilos	6 ft 6 in (1.98 m)	190 lb (86 kg)	1986–08–27	Far Eastern
C	24	(Philippines)	Ronan Santos	6 ft 7 in (2.01 m)		1997–03–24	Arellano
C	-	(Philippines)	Ladis Lepalam (IN)	6 ft 9 in (2.06 m)	200 lb (91 kg)	1999–11–27	St. Benilde

Head coach

- (Philippines) Dennis Pineda

Assistant coach(es)

- (Philippines) Franco Atienza
- (Philippines) Frederick Dimatulac
- (Philippines) Danny Ildefonso
- (Philippines) Willie Miller
- (Philippines) Daniel Rose
- (Philippines) Karl Santos

Team manager

- (Philippines) Jacob Lao
- (Philippines) Erwin Dotimas (assistant)

Legend

- (C) Team captain
- (CI) Commissioner's Cup Import
- (GI) Governors' Cup Import
- (EI) EASL Import
- (DP) Unsigned draft pick
- (FA) Free agent
- (IN) Inactive
- (S) Suspended
- (R) Rookie
- Injured

Roster

== Magnolia Chicken Timplados Hotshots ==
Magnolia Chicken Timplados Hotshots roster
Players
Coaches

Pos.	#	POB	Name	Height	Weight	DOB (YYYY–MM–DD)	From
G	0	(Philippines)	Paolo Taha	6 ft 0 in (1.83 m)	180 lb (82 kg)	1990–12–05	St. Benilde
C	1	(United States)	Terrell Brown-Soares (CI)	6 ft 9 in (2.06 m)	235 lb (107 kg)	1998–06–08	San Diego
G/F	2	(Philippines)	Javi Gómez de Liaño	6 ft 3 in (1.91 m)	193 lb (88 kg)	1998–07–27	Philippines
G	3	(Philippines)	Paul Lee	6 ft 0 in (1.83 m)	200 lb (91 kg)	1989–02–14	UE
G	5	(Philippines)	LA Tenorio (IN)	5 ft 9 in (1.75 m)	151 lb (68 kg)	1984–07–09	Ateneo
G/F	6	(United States)	Chris Koon (R)	6 ft 5 in (1.96 m)		2001–02–06	Ateneo
C	10	(Philippines)	Ian Sangalang	6 ft 7 in (2.01 m)	212 lb (96 kg)	1991–12–20	San Sebastian
G	13	(Italy)	Gab Gomez (R / IN)	5 ft 11 in (1.80 m)		2000–03–20	Ateneo
G	14	(Philippines)	Mark Barroca	5 ft 10 in (1.78 m)	170 lb (77 kg)	1986–04–25	Far Eastern
G	17	(Philippines)	Peter Alfaro	5 ft 11 in (1.80 m)		1998–12–17	San Beda
F	19	(United States)	Rome dela Rosa	6 ft 3 in (1.91 m)	185 lb (84 kg)	1990–12–11	San Beda
F	21	(Philippines)	Yukien Andrada (R)	6 ft 5 in (1.96 m)		2001–04–21	San Beda
F	22	(United States)	Zavier Lucero	6 ft 6 in (1.98 m)	205 lb (93 kg)	1999–04–05	Philippines
G	30	(Philippines)	Jerom Lastimosa	5 ft 11 in (1.80 m)		1998–07–01	Adamson
F	41	(United States)	Raffy Verano	6 ft 3 in (1.91 m)	200 lb (91 kg)	1997–11–16	Ateneo
C	42	(Australia)	James Laput	6 ft 10 in (2.08 m)	245 lb (111 kg)	1996–08–26	De La Salle
F/C	88	(Philippines)	Russel Escoto	6 ft 6 in (1.98 m)	200 lb (91 kg)	1992–12–04	Far Eastern

Head coach

- (Philippines) LA Tenorio

Assistant coach(es)

- (Philippines) Juno Sauler (1st assistant)
- (United States) Kirk Collier
- (Philippines) Angelito Esguerra
- (Philippines) Tonyboy Espinosa
- (Philippines) Raymond Gavieres
- (Philippines) Mon Jose
- (Philippines) Jude Paulite
- (Philippines) Julian Ramos
- (Philippines) Paul Sorongon
- (Philippines) Erick Arejola (consultant)

Team manager

- (Philippines) Alvin Patrimonio

Legend

- (C) Team captain
- (CI) Commissioner's Cup Import
- (GI) Governors' Cup Import
- (EI) EASL Import
- (DP) Unsigned draft pick
- (FA) Free agent
- (IN) Inactive
- (S) Suspended
- (R) Rookie
- Injured

Roster

== Meralco Bolts ==
Meralco Bolts roster
Players
Coaches

Pos.	#	POB	Name	Height	Weight	DOB (YYYY–MM–DD)	From
G	1	(Philippines)	Aaron Black	6 ft 1 in (1.85 m)	180 lb (82 kg)	1996–12–03	Ateneo
G	5	(United States)	Jason Brickman (R)	5 ft 10 in (1.78 m)	165 lb (75 kg)	1991–11–19	LIU Brooklyn
G	6	(United States)	Chris Banchero	6 ft 1 in (1.85 m)	175 lb (79 kg)	1989–01–24	Seattle Pacific
F	7	(United States)	Cliff Hodge	6 ft 4 in (1.93 m)	195 lb (88 kg)	1988–02–03	Hawaii Pacific
F	10	(Philippines)	Javee Mocon	6 ft 4 in (1.93 m)	189 lb (86 kg)	1995–04–07	San Beda
G/F	11	(United States)	Chris Newsome	6 ft 2 in (1.88 m)	190 lb (86 kg)	1990–07–25	Ateneo
G	17	(Philippines)	Anjo Caram	5 ft 7 in (1.70 m)	159 lb (72 kg)	1991–01–14	San Beda
F	19	(Philippines)	Bong Quinto	6 ft 2 in (1.88 m)		1994–12–15	Letran
C	20	(Philippines)	Raymond Almazan	6 ft 8 in (2.03 m)	194 lb (88 kg)	1989–08–02	Letran
F	22	(Philippines)	Allein Maliksi	6 ft 4 in (1.93 m)	180 lb (82 kg)	1987–09–18	UST
F	24	(Philippines)	Raymar Jose (IN)	6 ft 4 in (1.93 m)	210 lb (95 kg)	1992–08–06	Far Eastern
F	27	(Philippines)	Jansen Rios	6 ft 3 in (1.91 m)	185 lb (84 kg)	1991–10–28	Adamson
F/C	32	(United States)	Kyle Pascual	6 ft 6 in (1.98 m)	210 lb (95 kg)	1990–04–13	San Beda
C	33	(Australia)	Brandon Bates	6 ft 9 in (2.06 m)	231 lb (105 kg)	1997–08–12	De La Salle
G	71	(Philippines)	CJ Cansino	6 ft 2 in (1.88 m)		1999–10–27	Philippines
F/C	93	(Italy)	Vince Magbuhos (R)	6 ft 5 in (1.96 m)		1999–10–07	Adamson
C	–	(United States)	Marvin Jones (CI)	7 ft 0 in (2.13 m)	220 lb (100 kg)	1993–12–29	Texas Southern

Head coach

- (Philippines) Luigi Trillo

Assistant coach(es)

- (Philippines) Gene Afable (1st assistant)
- (Philippines) Reynel Hugnatan
- (Philippines) Sandro Soriano
- (Serbia) Nenad Vučinić (active consultant)
- (United States) Norman Black (consultant)

Team manager

- (Philippines) Paolo Trillo

Legend

- (C) Team captain
- (CI) Commissioner's Cup Import
- (GI) Governors' Cup Import
- (EI) EASL Import
- (DP) Unsigned draft pick
- (FA) Free agent
- (IN) Inactive
- (S) Suspended
- (R) Rookie
- Injured

Roster

== NLEX Road Warriors ==
NLEX Road Warriors roster
Players
Coaches

Pos.	#	POB	Name	Height	Weight	DOB (YYYY–MM–DD)	From
F	1	(Philippines)	Sidney Onwubere	6 ft 4 in (1.93 m)		1993–08–01	Emilio Aguinaldo
C	2	(Philippines)	Michael Miranda (IN)	6 ft 7 in (2.01 m)	210 lb (95 kg)	1990–12–12	San Sebastian
G	3	(Philippines)	Baser Amer (IN)	6 ft 0 in (1.83 m)	170 lb (77 kg)	1992–09–29	San Beda
F	6	(Philippines)	Enoch Valdez	6 ft 2 in (1.88 m)	178 lb (81 kg)	2000–05–26	Lyceum
G	7	(Philippines)	Kevin Alas	6 ft 0 in (1.83 m)	175 lb (79 kg)	1991–11–13	Letran
G	8	(Philippines)	Robert Bolick	6 ft 1 in (1.85 m)	178 lb (81 kg)	1995–09–13	San Beda
F	9	(Philippines)	Dominick Fajardo	6 ft 0 in (1.83 m)	220 lb (100 kg)	1993–10–25	Bulacan State
G/F	10	(New Zealand)	Richie Rodger	6 ft 2 in (1.88 m)	211 lb (96 kg)	1997–01–27	UE
G/F	11	(United States)	Robbie Herndon	6 ft 3 in (1.91 m)	180 lb (82 kg)	1993–07–16	San Francisco State
G	12	(Philippines)	Matt Nieto	6 ft 1 in (1.85 m)	160 lb (73 kg)	1997–05–31	Ateneo
G	13	(Philippines)	Ljay Gonzales (R)	5 ft 11 in (1.80 m)		1998–12–19	Far Eastern
G/F	14	(United States)	Schonny Winston	6 ft 4 in (1.93 m)	190 lb (86 kg)	1998–07–22	De La Salle
F/C	15	(Canada)	Brandon Ramirez	6 ft 5 in (1.96 m)		1997–10–29	York
C	17	(Philippines)	Lorenz Capulong (R)	6 ft 6 in (1.98 m)		2000–10–27	Arellano
F/C	18	(Philippines)	JB Bahio	6 ft 5 in (1.96 m)		1998–05–23	San Beda
C	20	(Philippines)	Dave Marcelo (IN)	6 ft 5 in (1.96 m)	223 lb (101 kg)	1989–02–22	San Beda
C	25	(Haiti)	Cady Lalanne (CI)	6 ft 10 in (2.08 m)	247 lb (112 kg)	1992–04–22	UMass
F	33	(Australia)	Anthony Semerad (injured)	6 ft 4 in (1.93 m)	230 lb (104 kg)	1991–04–25	San Beda
G	77	(Philippines)	Xyrus Torres	6 ft 0 in (1.83 m)		2000–09–23	Far Eastern
F	–	(Philippines)	Kevin Racal (IN)	6 ft 3 in (1.91 m)	175 lb (79 kg)	1991–05–16	Letran

Head coach

- (Philippines) Jong Uichico

Assistant coach(es)

- (Philippines) Borgie Hermida (1st assistant)
- (Philippines) Woody Co
- (Philippines) Anton Escolin
- (Philippines) Melo Lim
- (Philippines) Emman Monfort
- (Philippines) JB Sison
- (Philippines) Adonis Tierra
- (Philippines) Virgil Villavicencio (consultant)

Team manager

- (Philippines) Ronald Dulatre

Legend

- (C) Team captain
- (CI) Commissioner's Cup Import
- (GI) Governors' Cup Import
- (EI) EASL Import
- (DP) Unsigned draft pick
- (FA) Free agent
- (IN) Inactive
- (S) Suspended
- (R) Rookie
- Injured

Roster

== Phoenix Super LPG Fuel Masters ==
Phoenix Super LPG Fuel Masters roster
Players
Coaches

Pos.	#	POB	Name	Height	Weight	DOB (YYYY–MM–DD)	From
F/C	0	(Philippines)	Will Gozum (R)	6 ft 6 in (1.98 m)	205 lb (93 kg)	1999–04–08	St. Benilde
F/C	1	(United States)	Kai Ballungay	6 ft 7 in (2.01 m)	215 lb (98 kg)	2001–11–16	Ateneo
F/C	2	(United States)	James Dickey (CI)	6 ft 10 in (2.08 m)	215 lb (98 kg)	1996–11–28	UNC Greensboro
F	3	(United States)	Jason Perkins	6 ft 4 in (1.93 m)	235 lb (107 kg)	1992–09–20	De La Salle
G	10	(Philippines)	Evan Nelle	5 ft 11 in (1.80 m)		1998–06–08	De La Salle
F/C	12	(Canada)	Matthew Daves	6 ft 4 in (1.93 m)	235 lb (107 kg)	1999–02–12	Ateneo
G	13	(Italy)	JC Cullar	5 ft 10 in (1.78 m)			St. Benilde
F	18	(Philippines)	Francis Escandor	6 ft 3 in (1.91 m)		1999–03–18	De La Salle
G	19	(Philippines)	Tyler Tio	6 ft 0 in (1.83 m)	170 lb (77 kg)	1998–04–05	Ateneo
G/F	20	(New Zealand)	Kenneth Tuffin	6 ft 4 in (1.93 m)		1997–05–05	Far Eastern
F/C	23	(Philippines)	Prince Caperal	6 ft 7 in (2.01 m)	230 lb (104 kg)	1993–06–12	Arellano
C	24	(Philippines)	Dave Ando (R)	6 ft 7 in (2.01 m)		1999–10–25	UST
G	25	(Philippines)	Ricci Rivero	6 ft 1 in (1.85 m)	146 lb (66 kg)	1998–05–25	Philippines
F	26	(Philippines)	Bryan Santos	6 ft 5 in (1.96 m)	209 lb (95 kg)	1997–05–26	UST

Head coach

- (Philippines) Charles Tiu

Assistant coach(es)

- (Philippines) Jon Jacinto (1st assistant)
- (Philippines) Paolo Dizon
- (Philippines) Paolo Layug
- (Philippines) Ram Noriega
- (Philippines) TY Tang

Team manager

- (Philippines) Paolo Bugia
- (Philippines) Sheila Briones (assistant)

Legend

- (C) Team captain
- (CI) Commissioner's Cup Import
- (GI) Governors' Cup Import
- (EI) EASL Import
- (DP) Unsigned draft pick
- (FA) Free agent
- (IN) Inactive
- (S) Suspended
- (R) Rookie
- Injured

Roster

== Rain or Shine Elasto Painters ==
Rain or Shine Elasto Painters roster
Players
Coaches

Pos.	#	POB	Name	Height	Weight	DOB (YYYY–MM–DD)	From
F	0	(United States)	Caelan Tiongson	6 ft 5 in (1.96 m)		1992–05–07	Biola
G	1	(Philippines)	Adrian Nocum	6 ft 0 in (1.83 m)	167 lb (76 kg)	1999−08−10	Mapúa
G	2	(Sweden)	Felix Pangilinan-Lemetti	6 ft 1 in (1.85 m)		1999–02–10	Salt Lake CC
G	3	(Philippines)	Gian Mamuyac	6 ft 2 in (1.88 m)	165 lb (75 kg)	1999–03–05	Ateneo
F	4	(Philippines)	Mike Malonzo	6 ft 2 in (1.88 m)		1999−10−23	National-U
C	7	(United States)	Jaylen Johnson (CI)	6 ft 9 in (2.06 m)	230 lb (104 kg)	1996–08–07	Louisville
G	8	(Philippines)	Anton Asistio	5 ft 10 in (1.78 m)	175 lb (79 kg)	1995–06–02	Ateneo
G	9	(Philippines)	Joshua David (R)	6 ft 0 in (1.83 m)	180 lb (82 kg)	2000–01–06	De La Salle
G/F	10	(Philippines)	Shaun Ildefonso (IN)	6 ft 2 in (1.88 m)	198 lb (90 kg)	1997–09–30	National-U
G	11	(United States)	Stanley Pringle (injured)	6 ft 1 in (1.85 m)	185 lb (84 kg)	1987–03–05	Penn State
G/F	12	(Philippines)	Jun Roque (R)	6 ft 4 in (1.93 m)		2001−10−17	Letran
G	14	(Philippines)	Andrei Caracut	5 ft 10 in (1.78 m)	180 lb (82 kg)	1996–01–30	De La Salle
C	21	(United States)	Keith Datu (injured)	6 ft 8 in (2.03 m)	220 lb (100 kg)	1996–03–19	Chico State
G/F	22	(Philippines)	Jhonard Clarito	6 ft 2 in (1.88 m)	187 lb (85 kg)	1996–04–03	De Ocampo
C	24	(United States)	Luis Villegas	6 ft 7 in (2.01 m)	215 lb (98 kg)	1997−09−05	UE
F/C	25	(Philippines)	Leonard Santillan	6 ft 4 in (1.93 m)	210 lb (95 kg)	1996–03–05	De La Salle
C	28	(Philippines)	Beau Belga	6 ft 5 in (1.96 m)	245 lb (111 kg)	1986–11–30	Philippine Christian
G	29	(Philippines)	Deo Cuajao (R)	6 ft 1 in (1.85 m)		2001−01−30	Letran
C	41	(Philippines)	Kris Porter (IN)	6 ft 5 in (1.96 m)	195 lb (88 kg)	1994–09–02	Ateneo
F	44	(Philippines)	Christian Manaytay (R)	6 ft 5 in (1.96 m)		1999−11−02	UST

Head coach

- (Philippines) Yeng Guiao

Assistant coach(es)

- (Philippines) Caloy Garcia (1st assistant)
- (Philippines) Mike Buendia
- (Philippines) Ricky Umayam

Team manager

- (Philippines) Mamerto Mondragon^{[a]}
- (Philippines) Jireh Ibañes (assistant)

Legend

- (C) Team captain
- (CI) Commissioner's Cup Import
- (GI) Governors' Cup Import
- (EI) EASL Import
- (DP) Unsigned draft pick
- (FA) Free agent
- (IN) Inactive
- (S) Suspended
- (R) Rookie
- Injured

Roster

- ^{a} also serves as Rain or Shine's board governor.

== San Miguel Beermen ==
San Miguel Beermen roster
Players
Coaches

Pos.	#	POB	Name	Height	Weight	DOB (YYYY–MM–DD)	From
G	1	(United States)	Kris Rosales	6 ft 0 in (1.83 m)	165 lb (75 kg)	1990–12–20	Hope International
F	2	(Philippines)	Don Trollano	6 ft 3 in (1.91 m)	182 lb (83 kg)	1992–01–07	Adamson
F/C	3	(United States)	Moala Tautuaa	6 ft 8 in (2.03 m)	245 lb (111 kg)	1989–04–30	Chadron State
G	6	(United States)	Chris Ross	6 ft 1 in (1.85 m)	180 lb (82 kg)	1985–03–09	Marshall
F	11	(Sweden)	Andreas Cahilig	6 ft 5 in (1.96 m)		1991–01–22	EARIST
G/F	13	(United States)	Marcio Lassiter	6 ft 2 in (1.88 m)	185 lb (84 kg)	1987–05–16	Cal State Fullerton
C	15	(Philippines)	June Mar Fajardo	6 ft 10 in (2.08 m)	268 lb (122 kg)	1989–11–17	Cebu
G/F	21	(Philippines)	Jeron Teng	6 ft 2 in (1.88 m)	185 lb (84 kg)	1994–03–21	De La Salle
C	22	(Philippines)	JM Calma	6 ft 6 in (1.98 m)	193 lb (88 kg)	1997–12–02	San Sebastian
G/F	23	(Australia)	Royce Mantua (R)	6 ft 4 in (1.93 m)		2002–04–12	Adamson
F/C	24	(United States)	Marcus Lee (CI)	6 ft 11 in (2.11 m)	218 lb (99 kg)	1994–09–14	California
G	33	(Philippines)	Juami Tiongson	5 ft 10 in (1.78 m)	175 lb (79 kg)	1991–02–05	Ateneo
G	39	(Philippines)	Jericho Cruz	6 ft 1 in (1.85 m)	190 lb (86 kg)	1990–10–11	Adamson
G	55	(United States)	Chris Miller (R)	6 ft 2 in (1.88 m)	180 lb (82 kg)	1993–08–31	Salem
G/F	77	(Hong Kong)	CJ Perez	6 ft 2 in (1.88 m)	185 lb (84 kg)	1993–11–17	Lyceum
F	91	(Philippines)	Rodney Brondial	6 ft 5 in (1.96 m)	210 lb (95 kg)	1990–11–20	Adamson

Head coach

- (Philippines) Leo Austria

Assistant coach(es)

- (Philippines) Peter Martin (1st assistant)
- (Philippines) Ato Agustin
- (Philippines) Dayong Mendoza
- (Philippines) Biboy Ravanes
- (United States) Chris Ross
- (Philippines) Boyzie Zamar
- (Philippines) Jorge Gallent (consultant)

Team manager

- (Philippines) Gee Abanilla
- (Philippines) Daniel Henares (assistant)

Legend

- (C) Team captain
- (CI) Commissioner's Cup Import
- (GI) Governors' Cup Import
- (EI) EASL Import
- (DP) Unsigned draft pick
- (FA) Free agent
- (IN) Inactive
- (S) Suspended
- (R) Rookie
- Injured

Roster

== Terrafirma Dyip ==
Terrafirma Dyip roster
Players
Coaches

Pos.	#	POB	Name	Height	Weight	DOB (YYYY–MM–DD)	From
F	0	(Philippines)	Ira Bataller (R / FA)	6 ft 4 in (1.93 m)		2000–11–19	Letran
G	3	(United States)	Paul Garcia	5 ft 11 in (1.80 m)	170 lb (77 kg)	1999–06–04	Ateneo
C	5	(Philippines)	Keith Zaldivar	6 ft 6 in (1.98 m)		1996–05–25	Adamson
F/C	6	(Philippines)	Louie Sangalang (IN)	6 ft 4 in (1.93 m)	198 lb (90 kg)	1998–03–03	Letran
G	7	(United States)	Jerrick Ahanmisi	6 ft 1 in (1.85 m)	185 lb (84 kg)	1997–10–16	Adamson
F	9	(Philippines)	CJ Catapusan	6 ft 3 in (1.91 m)		1997–01–29	Philippines
F	10	(Philippines)	Aljon Mariano	6 ft 3 in (1.91 m)	175 lb (79 kg)	1992–08–03	UST
G	13	(United States)	Maverick Ahanmisi	6 ft 2 in (1.88 m)	190 lb (86 kg)	1991–07–17	Minnesota
C	18	(Philippines)	Geo Chiu	6 ft 10 in (2.08 m)		2001–05–18	Ateneo
G	19	(Philippines)	Paolo Hernandez	6 ft 0 in (1.83 m)	196 lb (89 kg)	1999–01–09	Mapúa
C	21	(Finland)	Mubashar Ali (CI)	7 ft 0 in (2.13 m)		1997–02–28	Florida Memorial
F	23	(British Hong Kong)	Joseph Eriobu	6 ft 4 in (1.93 m)	198 lb (90 kg)	1992–02–12	Mapúa
G	24	(Philippines)	Mark Nonoy (IN)	5 ft 9 in (1.75 m)		2000–07–24	De La Salle
F	26	(Philippines)	JM Bravo (R)	6 ft 4 in (1.93 m)		2000–01–03	Lyceum
F	28	(Philippines)	Shawn Umali (R)	6 ft 3 in (1.91 m)		2000–12–02	St. Benilde
G/F	30	(Philippines)	Didat Hanapi	6 ft 2 in (1.88 m)		2001–07–31	Adamson
G	38	(Philippines)	Brent Paraiso	6 ft 1 in (1.85 m)	190 lb (86 kg)	1998–02–26	Letran
C	88	(Philippines)	Ben Adamos	6 ft 7 in (2.01 m)	200 lb (91 kg)	1995–12–30	UPHSD

Head coach

- (Philippines) Ronald Tubid

Assistant coach(es)

- (Philippines) Jeff Napa (1st assistant)
- (Philippines) Alfredo Jarencio II

Team manager

- (Philippines) Waiyip Chong

Legend

- (C) Team captain
- (CI) Commissioner's Cup Import
- (GI) Governors' Cup Import
- (EI) EASL Import
- (DP) Unsigned draft pick
- (FA) Free agent
- (IN) Inactive
- (S) Suspended
- (R) Rookie
- Injured

Roster

== Titan Ultra Giant Risers ==
Titan Ultra Giant Risers roster
Players
Coaches

Pos.	#	POB	Name	Height	Weight	DOB (YYYY–MM–DD)	From
F	2	(United States)	Michael Gilmore (CI)	6 ft 10 in (2.08 m)	220 lb (100 kg)	1995–01–15	VCU
G	3	(Philippines)	Fran Yu	5 ft 9 in (1.75 m)	154 lb (70 kg)	1998–06–16	Letran
G	4	(Philippines)	Bryan Sajonia (R)	6 ft 0 in (1.83 m)		2000–07–04	San Beda
F	5	(Philippines)	Ato Ular	6 ft 4 in (1.93 m)	196 lb (89 kg)	1995–05–04	Letran
G	7	(Philippines)	Jerrick Balanza	6 ft 1 in (1.85 m)	190 lb (86 kg)	1996–09–06	Letran
F/C	9	(Philippines)	Paolo Javillonar	6 ft 6 in (1.98 m)		2000–05–13	Letran
F/C	10	(Philippines)	Damie Cuntapay	6 ft 5 in (1.96 m)		1998–10–22	San Beda
G	11	(Philippines)	Aljun Melecio	5 ft 8 in (1.73 m)	160 lb (73 kg)	1998–07–25	De La Salle
G	13	(Philippines)	James Martinez (IN)	5 ft 9 in (1.75 m)	170 lb (77 kg)	1987–01–31	UE
F/C	18	(Philippines)	Jeo Ambohot	6 ft 7 in (2.01 m)	193 lb (88 kg)	1996–11–18	Letran
G/F	19	(Philippines)	Von Pessumal	6 ft 2 in (1.88 m)	185 lb (84 kg)	1993–02–12	Ateneo
F	22	(Australia)	Cade Flores	6 ft 5 in (1.96 m)	214 lb (97 kg)		Arellano
C	23	(Philippines)	Mark Omega (R)	6 ft 5 in (1.96 m)		2000–08–26	Letran
G/F	24	(United States)	Joshua Munzon	6 ft 4 in (1.93 m)	200 lb (91 kg)	1995–01–15	Cal State LA
F	27	(Philippines)	King Caralipio	6 ft 2 in (1.88 m)	176 lb (80 kg)		Letran
F	28	(Philippines)	Mark Sangco (R)	6 ft 5 in (1.96 m)		1999–10–02	St. Benilde
F	57	(Philippines)	Aris Dionisio	6 ft 4 in (1.93 m)		1995–07–21	St. Clare

Head coach

- (Philippines) Rensy Bajar

Assistant coach(es)

- (Philippines) Jerson Cabiltes (1st assistant)
- (Philippines) Maverick Chua
- (Philippines) Mike Fermin
- (Philippines) Raymond Valenzona
- (Philippines) Bonnie Tan (consultant)

Team manager

- (Philippines) Danilo Martinez

Legend

- (C) Team captain
- (CI) Commissioner's Cup Import
- (GI) Governors' Cup Import
- (EI) EASL Import
- (DP) Unsigned draft pick
- (FA) Free agent
- (IN) Inactive
- (S) Suspended
- (R) Rookie
- Injured

== TNT Tropang 5G ==
TNT Tropang 5G roster
Players
Coaches

Pos.	#	POB	Name	Height	Weight	DOB (YYYY–MM–DD)	From
G	0	(United States)	Simon Enciso	5 ft 11 in (1.80 m)	185 lb (84 kg)	1991–02–12	Notre Dame de Namur
F	2	(United States)	Tyrus Hill	6 ft 5 in (1.96 m)	185 lb (84 kg)	1996–03–20	De La Salle
G	6	(Philippines)	Rey Nambatac	5 ft 11 in (1.80 m)		1994–01–27	Letran
C	7	(Philippines)	Poy Erram (IN)	6 ft 8 in (2.03 m)	227 lb (103 kg)	1989–07–07	Ateneo
F	8	(Philippines)	Calvin Oftana	6 ft 5 in (1.96 m)	196 lb (89 kg)	1996–01–03	San Beda
C	11	(Sudan)	Bol Bol (CI)	7 ft 3 in (2.21 m)	220 lb (100 kg)	1999–11–16	Oregon
F	12	(Philippines)	Glenn Khobuntin	6 ft 4 in (1.93 m)	195 lb (88 kg)	1991–09–07	National-U
F	14	(Philippines)	Mike Nieto	6 ft 2 in (1.88 m)	200 lb (91 kg)	1997–05–31	Ateneo
G	15	(Australia)	Jordan Heading	6 ft 2 in (1.88 m)	189 lb (86 kg)	1996–01–30	Cal Baptist
G/F	16	(Philippines)	Roger Pogoy (injured) (C)	6 ft 2 in (1.88 m)	180 lb (82 kg)	1992–06–16	Far Eastern
G	17	(Philippines)	Jayson Castro	5 ft 10 in (1.78 m)	185 lb (84 kg)	1986–06–30	Philippine Christian
F/C	21	(United States)	Kelly Williams	6 ft 7 in (2.01 m)	215 lb (98 kg)	1982–02–07	Oakland
G	28	(Philippines)	Jio Jalalon	5 ft 9 in (1.75 m)	150 lb (68 kg)	1992–08–02	Arellano
F/C	32	(United States)	Henry Galinato	6 ft 6 in (1.98 m)	245 lb (111 kg)	1997–09–09	Philippines
G/F	35	(Philippines)	Kim Aurin	6 ft 1 in (1.85 m)	190 lb (86 kg)	1997–02–05	UPHSD
F/C	45	(United States)	Brandon Ganuelas-Rosser	6 ft 6 in (1.98 m)	220 lb (100 kg)	1994–06–29	UC Riverside
F	77	(Philippines)	Kevin Ferrer	6 ft 5 in (1.96 m)	188 lb (85 kg)	1993–03–26	UST

Head coach

- (Philippines) Chot Reyes

Assistant coach(es)

- (Philippines) Josh Reyes (1st assistant)
- (Philippines) Sandy Arespacochaga
- (Philippines) Ranidel de Ocampo
- (Philippines) Yuri Escueta
- (Philippines) Ryan Reyes
- (Philippines) Bong Ravena

Team manager

- (Philippines) Jojo Lastimosa
- (Philippines) Yvette Ruiz (assistant)

Legend

- (C) Team captain
- (CI) Commissioner's Cup Import
- (GI) Governors' Cup Import
- (EI) EASL Import
- (DP) Unsigned draft pick
- (FA) Free agent
- (IN) Inactive
- (S) Suspended
- (R) Rookie
- Injured

Roster
