= 2026 PBA All-Star Weekend =

33rd edition of the PBA All-Star Weekend

North All-Stars	South All-Stars
147	142
	1	2	3	4	Total
North All-Stars	50	29	39	29	147
South All-Stars	36	36	49	21	142
- Date: March 6 and 8, 2026
- Venue: Candon City Arena, Candon, Ilocos Sur
- MVP: Japeth Aguilar
- Network: RPTV, PBA Rush, Pilipinas Live

The 2026 PBA All-Star Weekend, also known as the PBA season 50 All-Star Weekend, was the 33rd edition of the Philippine Basketball Association (PBA)'s All-Star Weekend. The event was hosted on March 6 and 8, 2026 at Candon City Arena in Candon, Ilocos Sur. It was the first All-Star Weekend since 2024 as the 2025 edition was cancelled due to security concerns, and the first to be held in Luzon since Calasiao's hosting in 2019.

== Background ==
On September 13, 2025, PBA commissioner Willie Marcial announced the locations of the next two All-Star Weekends. The 2026 PBA All-Star Weekend was hosted by Candon, Ilocos Sur in March while the 2027 event will be hosted by Cagayan de Oro. He also stated that the 2026 All-Star Weekend had been awarded to Candon as early as 2023.

== All-Star Weekend side events ==
As was the case in 2024, the Slam Dunk Contest was not held as part of the 2026 weekend festivities. Instead, there was a second Obstacle Challenge.

=== Obstacle Challenge ===
The Obstacle Challenge was held on March 6. Alongside the traditional event for big men (power forwards and centers), a separate event was held for guards.

==== Big men ====
One player from each team was selected to participate in the contest. JM Calma of the San Miguel Beermen was the defending champion of the Obstacle Challenge.

Pos.	Player	Team	Height (ft. / in.)	Weight (lb)
C	Japeth Aguilar	Barangay Ginebra San Miguel	6' 9"	235
PF/C	Abu Tratter	Blackwater Bossing	6' 5"	231
C	Justin Arana	Converge FiberXers	6' 7"	231
C	James Laput	Magnolia Chicken Timplados Hotshots	6' 10"	245
C	Brandon Bates	Meralco Bolts	6' 9"	231
C/PF	Brandon Ramirez	NLEX Road Warriors	6' 5"	
PF/C	Kai Ballungay	Phoenix Super LPG Fuel Masters	6' 7"	215
PF/C	Leonard Santillan	Rain or Shine Elasto Painters	6' 4"	210
C	JM Calma	San Miguel Beermen	6' 6"	193
C	Geo Chiu	Terrafirma Dyip	6' 10"	
C/PF	Damie Cuntapay	Titan Ultra Giant Risers	6' 5"	
C/PF	Henry Galinato	TNT Tropang 5G	6' 6"	245

Notes

- Gold represent current champion.

First Round
JM Calma (San Miguel)	L
Japeth Aguilar (Barangay Ginebra)	W
Justin Arana (Converge)	L
James Laput (Magnolia)	W

Semifinals
Japeth Aguilar (Barangay Ginebra)	L
James Laput (Magnolia)	W

First Round
Damie Cuntapay (Titan Ultra)	L
Henry Galinato (TNT)	W
Brandon Bates (Meralco)	W
Abu Tratter (Blackwater)	L

Semifinals
Henry Galinato (TNT)	L
Brandon Bates (Meralco)	W

First Round
Leonard Santillan (Rain or Shine)	L
Brandon Ramirez (NLEX)	W
Geo Chiu (Terrafirma)	W
Kai Ballungay (Phoenix Super LPG)	L

Semifinals
Brandon Ramirez (NLEX)	W
Geo Chiu (Terrafirma)	L

Final round
Pos.	Player	Team	Time
C	Brandon Bates	Meralco Bolts	22.88s
C/PF	Brandon Ramirez	NLEX Road Warriors	27.26s
C	James Laput	Magnolia Chicken Timplados Hotshots	45.69s

==== Guards ====
One player from each team was selected to participate in the contest.

Pos.	Player	Team	Height (ft. / in.)	Weight (lb)
PG	RJ Abarrientos	Barangay Ginebra San Miguel	5' 11"	174
PG	Dalph Panopio	Blackwater Bossing	6' 1"	180
PG/SG	Juan Gómez de Liaño	Converge FiberXers	6' 0"	163
PG	Jerom Lastimosa	Magnolia Chicken Timplados Hotshots	5' 11"	
SG	CJ Cansino	Meralco Bolts	6' 2"	
PG/SG	Robert Bolick	NLEX Road Warriors	6' 1"	178
SF	Francis Escandor	Phoenix Super LPG Fuel Masters	6' 3"	
PG	Felix Pangilinan-Lemetti	Rain or Shine Elasto Painters	6' 1"	190
PG	Juami Tiongson	San Miguel Beermen	5' 10"	175
SG	Jerrick Ahanmisi	Terrafirma Dyip	6' 1"	185
PG	Fran Yu	Titan Ultra Giant Risers	5' 9"	154
PG/SG	Rey Nambatac	TNT Tropang 5G	5' 11"	

First Round
Jerrick Ahanmisi (Terrafirma)	W
Felix Pangilinan-Lemetti (Rain or Shine)	L

First Round
Rey Nambatac (TNT)	W
CJ Cansino (Meralco)	L

First Round
Jerom Lastimosa (Magnolia)	L
Fran Yu (Titan Ultra)	W

First Round
Francis Escandor (Phoenix Super LPG)	L
Juan Gómez de Liaño (Converge)	W

First Round
RJ Abarrientos (Barangay Ginebra)	L
Juami Tiongson (San Miguel)	W

First Round
Dalph Panopio (Blackwater)	W
Robert Bolick (NLEX)	L

Final round
Pos.	Player	Team	Time
SG	Jerrick Ahanmisi	Terrafirma Dyip	24.94s
PG	Dalph Panopio	Blackwater Bossing	26.97s
PG/SG	Rey Nambatac	TNT Tropang 5G	27.94s
PG/SG	Juan Gómez de Liaño	Converge FiberXers	35.83s
PG	Fran Yu	Titan Ultra Giant Risers	37.52s
PG	Juami Tiongson	San Miguel Beermen	50.70s

=== Three-Point Shootout ===
The Three-Point Shootout was held on March 6 as a single event rather than being split into two as was the case in 2024. One player from each team was selected to participate in the contest.

Pos.	Player	Team	Height (ft. / in.)	Weight (lb)	First round	Final round
SG	Jerrick Ahanmisi	Terrafirma Dyip	6' 1"	185	22	30
SF/SG	Marcio Lassiter	San Miguel Beermen	6' 2"	185	25	25
PG/SG	Juan Gómez de Liaño	Converge FiberXers	6' 0"	163	22	18
PF/SF	Ralph Cu	Barangay Ginebra San Miguel	6' 4"	210	21	DNQ
PG	Andrei Caracut	Rain or Shine Elasto Painters	5' 10"	180	21	DNQ
SF/SG	Javi Gómez de Liaño	Magnolia Chicken Timplados Hotshots	6' 3"	193	19	DNQ
SG	CJ Cansino	Meralco Bolts	6' 2"		19	DNQ
SG	Xyrus Torres	NLEX Road Warriors	6' 0"		17	DNQ
SF	Francis Escandor	Phoenix Super LPG Fuel Masters	6' 3"		16	DNQ
SF	Calvin Oftana	TNT Tropang 5G	6' 5"	186	16	DNQ
SG/PG	Sedrick Barefield	Blackwater Bossing	6' 2"	190	14	DNQ
SF	King Caralipio	Titan Ultra Giant Risers	6' 2"	176	12	DNQ

Notes

- Gold represent current champion.

=== Blitz Game (Rookies and Sophomores vs. Juniors) ===
The Blitz Game was held on March 6 as the final Friday event. The game returned to the Rookies and Sophomores vs. Juniors format used in 2019 instead of the Greats vs. Stalwarts format used in 2023 and 2024.

Since Leo Austria and Chot Reyes were selected as the All-Star Game head coaches, the two Blitz Game teams were coached by an assistant coach from either San Miguel Beermen or TNT Tropang 5G. Notably, RJ Abarrientos and Juan Gómez de Liaño aren't part of the Blitz Game despite having enough votes to be selected, due to their inclusion in the All-Star Game.

Rookies and Sophomores
Pos.	Player	Team	R/S
SG/PG	Sedrick Barefield	Blackwater Bossing	Sophomore
PF/C	Kai Ballungay	Phoenix Super LPG Fuel Masters	Sophomore
SF	Sonny Estil	Barangay Ginebra San Miguel	Rookie
PG	Jerom Lastimosa	Magnolia Chicken Timplados Hotshots	Sophomore
SF	Mike Malonzo	Rain or Shine Elasto Painters	Sophomore
PG	Evan Nelle	Phoenix Super LPG Fuel Masters	Sophomore
PG	Mark Nonoy	Terrafirma Dyip	Sophomore
PG	Felix Pangilinan-Lemetti	Rain or Shine Elasto Painters	Sophomore
PG	Dalph Panopio	Blackwater Bossing	Rookie
PF/SF	Jonnel Policarpio	Converge FiberXers	Sophomore
C/PF	Brandon Ramirez	NLEX Road Warriors	Sophomore
SG	Xyrus Torres	NLEX Road Warriors	Sophomore
Head coach: Dayong Mendoza (San Miguel Beermen)

Juniors
Pos.	Player	Team
SG/SF	Kim Aurin	TNT Tropang 5G
C	Brandon Bates	Meralco Bolts
SF	King Caralipio	Titan Ultra Giant Risers
PF/SF	Ralph Cu	Barangay Ginebra San Miguel
PF/SF	Christian David	Blackwater Bossing
SF	Dominick Fajardo	NLEX Road Warriors
PF	Cade Flores	Titan Ultra Giant Risers
C/PF	Henry Galinato	TNT Tropang 5G
SF/SG	Kenneth Tuffin	Phoenix Super LPG Fuel Masters
SG	Ricci Rivero	Phoenix Super LPG Fuel Masters
SG/SF	Schonny Winston	NLEX Road Warriors
PG	Fran Yu	Titan Ultra Giant Risers
Head coaches: Sandy Arespacochaga and Yuri Escueta (TNT Tropang 5G)

==== Game ====
TV5 and PBA Rush

March 6
7:00 pm

Report

Juniors 150, Rookies and Sophomores 154
Scoring by quarter: 35–32, 29–31, 41–49, 45–42
Pts: Rivero 30	Pts: Lastimosa 27

Candon City Arena, Candon, Ilocos Sur

- Game MVP: Jerom Lastimosa (Rookies and Sophomores)

=== Shooting Stars ===
The Shooting Stars commenced for the first time since 2024. There was one PBA courtside reporter, one PBA player, one government official, one sportswriter and a lucky fan. Team Blue led by Tiebreaker Times sportswriter Justine Bacnis won the Shooting Stars.

== All-Star Game ==
The 2026 PBA All-Star Game featured the return of the North vs. South format last used in 2019.

=== Rosters ===
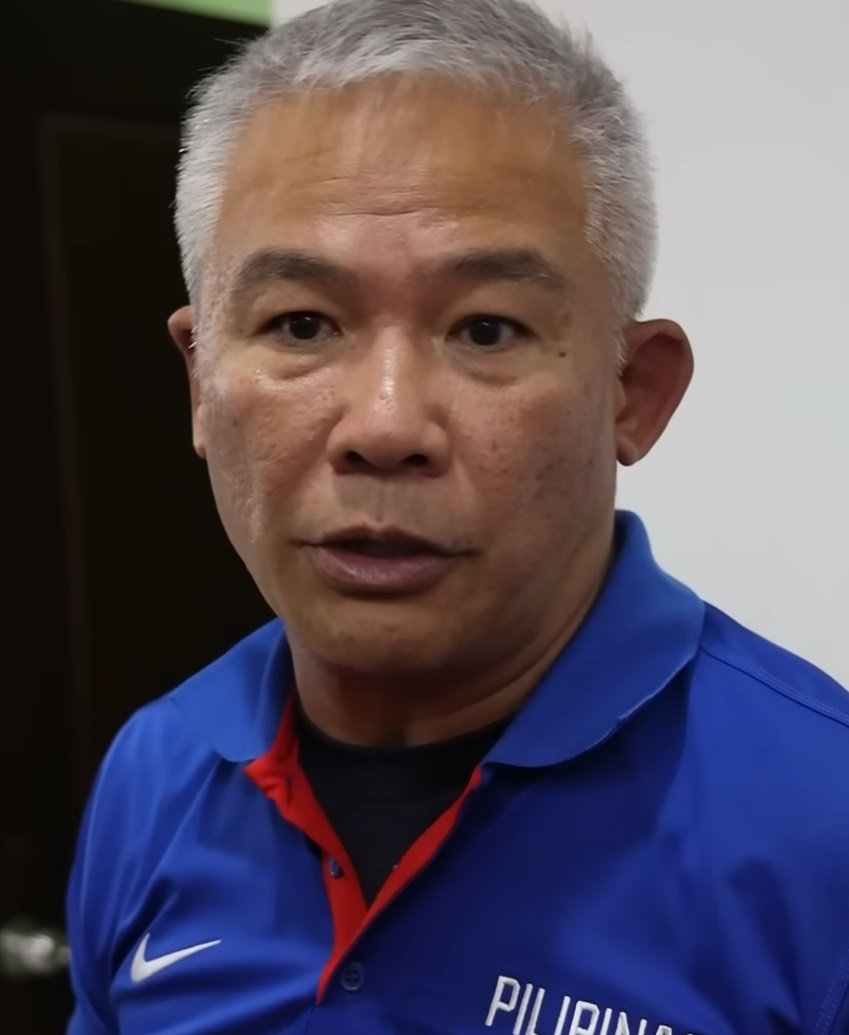
The San Miguel Beermen's Leo Austria and TNT Tropang 5G's Chot Reyes (pictured) were selected as the All-Star Game head coaches.

Voting ran from December 5, 2025, to January 18, 2026, and nominees were divided into North and South based on their place of origin. The starters for each team are decided through the fan voting system while the reserves are selected by the league's head coaches.

The North All-Stars was coached by Leo Austria of the San Miguel Beermen, who would be coaching in his fifth All-Star Game and first since 2018. Japeth Aguilar of Barangay Ginebra San Miguel was the leading vote-getter among North nominees. He was joined by Calvin Abueva and Juan Gómez de Liaño of Converge FiberXers, Stephen Holt of Barangay Ginebra, and CJ Perez of San Miguel in the starting lineup.

The reserves for the North include Justin Arana and Justine Baltazar of Converge, CJ Cansino and Chris Newsome of Meralco Bolts, Zavier Lucero of Magnolia Chicken Timplados Hotshots, Adrian Nocum of Rain or Shine Elasto Painters and Don Trollano of San Miguel.

The South All-Stars was coached by Chot Reyes of the TNT Tropang 5G, who would be coaching in his eighth All-Star Game and first since 2018. June Mar Fajardo of San Miguel had the most votes among South nominees. The rest of the starters includes RJ Abarrientos and Scottie Thompson of Barangay Ginebra, Robert Bolick of NLEX Road Warriors and Calvin Oftana of TNT.

Completing the South roster are reserves JB Bahio of NLEX, Jericho Cruz of San Miguel, Rey Nambatac and Roger Pogoy of TNT, Leonard Santillan and Caelan Tiongson of Rain or Shine and Alec Stockton of Converge.

Abueva, Aguilar, and Fajardo are all selected for their tenth All-Star Game.

North All-Stars
Pos.	Player	Team	No. of selections
Starters
SF/PF	Calvin Abueva	Converge FiberXers (Note: Abueva was still a member of the Titan Ultra Giant Risers during the voting period before being traded to Converge. He has not debuted for the team prior to the All-Star Game.)	10
C	Japeth Aguilar	Barangay Ginebra San Miguel	10
PG/SG	Juan Gómez de Liaño	Converge FiberXers	1
SF/SG	Stephen Holt	Barangay Ginebra San Miguel	1
SG/SF	CJ Perez	San Miguel Beermen	3
Reserves
C	Justin Arana	Converge FiberXers	1
PF/C	Justine Baltazar	Converge FiberXers	1
SG	CJ Cansino	Meralco Bolts	1
PF	Zavier Lucero^{DNP1}	Magnolia Chicken Timplados Hotshots	1
SG/SF	Chris Newsome	Meralco Bolts	3
SG/PG	Gian Mamuyac^{REP1}	Rain or Shine Elasto Painters	2
SG	Adrian Nocum	Rain or Shine Elasto Painters	1
SF	Don Trollano	San Miguel Beermen	2
Head coach: Leo Austria (San Miguel Beermen)

South All-Stars
Pos.	Player	Team	No. of selections
Starters
PG	RJ Abarrientos	Barangay Ginebra San Miguel	1
PG/SG	Robert Bolick	NLEX Road Warriors	3
C	June Mar Fajardo	San Miguel Beermen	10
SF	Calvin Oftana	TNT Tropang 5G	3
SG/PG	Scottie Thompson^{INJ1}	Barangay Ginebra San Miguel	7
PF/C	Leonard Santillan^{ST1}	Rain or Shine Elasto Painters	1
Reserves
PF/C	JB Bahio	NLEX Road Warriors	1
SG/PG	Jericho Cruz^{INJ2}	San Miguel Beermen	4
PG/SG	Rey Nambatac	TNT Tropang 5G	1
SG/SF	Roger Pogoy^{INJ3}	TNT Tropang 5G	6
SG	Alec Stockton	Converge FiberXers	1
PF/SF	Caelan Tiongson	Rain or Shine Elasto Painters	1
Head coach: Chot Reyes (TNT Tropang 5G)

- ^DNP1 Zavier Lucero did not participate.
- ^REP1 Gian Mamuyac played in place of Zavier Lucero.
- ^INJ1 Scottie Thompson did not play due to an injury.
- ^ST1 Leonard Santillan started in place of Scottie Thompson.
- ^INJ2 Jericho Cruz did not play due to an achilles injury.
- ^INJ3 Roger Pogoy did not play due to a hamstring injury.

=== Game ===
RPTV and PBA Rush

March 8
7:30 pm

Box score

North All-Stars 147, South All-Stars 142
Scoring by quarter: 50–36, 29–36, 39–49, 29–21
Pts: Perez 32	Pts: Stockton 29

Candon City Arena, Candon, Ilocos Sur

- All-Star Game MVP: Japeth Aguilar (North All-Stars)
