= PBA All-Star Game =

Annual exhibition games hosted by the Philippine Basketball Association

- Frequency: Annual
- Inaugurated: 1989 (Pasig)
- Previous event: 2026 (Candon)
- Next event: 2027 (Cagayan de Oro)
- Participants: Various
- Organizer: Philippine Basketball Association
- 2026 PBA All-Star Weekend

The PBA All-Star Game is an exhibition game hosted annually by the Philippine Basketball Association (PBA), matching the league's star players using various formats. It is the featured event of PBA All-Star Weekend. The All-Star game was first staged at The ULTRA on June 4, 1989.

The starting lineup for each squad is selected by a fan ballot, while the reserves are chosen by a vote among the head coaches of the league's teams. If a selected player is injured and cannot participate, the league officials select a replacement. The head coaches of the teams that entered the season's first conference, the Philippine Cup, are chosen as the coaches of the teams in the All-Star Game.

== Background ==
The annual All-Star Game was instituted in 1989 and has already evolved into different types of competition, more commonly in the following formats: Philippine national team vs. PBA All-Stars (last played in 2018), Rookies, Sophomores & Juniors (RSJ) vs. Veterans (last played in 2012), and North vs. South match-up (last played in 2026). The manner by which players to the All-Star Game varied through the years. Currently, the two coaches tapped to lead the two All-Star teams were the ones who selected their players but since the mid-2000s the starting five are selected through fan voting and the reserves would now be the ones chosen by the head coaches of all the PBA teams. For the 2005–2006 season, fans from the host city or province were given the choice to select the sixth man of each team. After each game, an All-Star Most Valuable Player (MVP) was chosen by writers covering the annual event.

Vergel Meneses had clearly stamped his mark on this mid-year festivities as he remains to be the only four-time All-Star MVP awardee collecting the award in 1995, 1998, 2000 and 2003. In its entire history, eight players have been named multiple winners of the All-Star MVP award namely, Meneses, Japeth Aguilar (2019, 2024 and 2026), Terrence Romeo (2015, 2017 and 2018), Benjie Paras (1994 and 1999), Asi Taulava (2004 and 2006), Jayjay Helterbrand (2005 and 2007), Arwind Santos (2013 and 2019), Jeff Chan (2013 and 2018), and Matthew Wright (twice in 2017)

James Yap currently holds the record for most number of All-Star Game appearances with 18.

== Types ==
The league has adopted various formats for the All-Star Game:

- Veterans vs. Rookies-Sophomores-Juniors (RSJ): The Veteran team consists of players who have played in the league for four or more years. The RSJ team consists of players who have played in the league for less than four years.
- North vs. South: The players' team is assigned according to their birthplaces, and in cases of players born outside the Philippines, on their parents' birthplaces. Players from Luzon play for the North All-Stars, while those from Visayas and Mindanao play for the South All-Stars.
- Philippine men's national team vs. PBA All-Stars: The Philippine team consist of PBA players from national pool with a naturalized player or a cadet player if any. The national team usually carries the name of its primary sponsor or its nickname. (e.g. Philippine Centennial Team, Powerade Team Pilipinas, Gilas Pilipinas)
- Team A vs. Team B: Two All-Star teams with no particular category are formed. This format was used in 1991 (Light All-Stars vs. Dark All-Stars) and 2003 (Commissioner's All-Stars vs. Governors' All-Stars).
  - From 2023 to 2024, two All-Star teams are captained by the top two leading vote-getters, then they will pick the players from the list (wherein fans will vote up to 24 players) via draft for their team, similar to the NBA All-Star Game format from 2018 to 2023.

== All-Star Game results ==
This is a list of each All-Star Game, the venue at which it was played, and the Game MVP. Parenthesized numbers indicate multiple times that venue, city, or player has occurred as of that instance (e.g. "Vergel Meneses (2)" in 1998 indicates that was his second All-Star MVP award).

Year	Winning team	Score	Losing team	Host venue	Host city	MVP (PBA team)
1989	Veterans	132–130	Rookies-Sophomores-Juniors	The ULTRA	Pasig	Elmer Cabahug* (Alaska)
1990	Veterans	146–118	Rookies-Sophomores-Juniors	The ULTRA (2)	Pasig	Samboy Lim (San Miguel)
1991	Light Team All-Stars	127–120	Dark Team All-Stars	The ULTRA (3)	Pasig	Alvin Patrimonio (Purefoods)
1992	South All-Stars	108–105	North All-Stars	PSC-NASA (4)	Pasig	Alvin Teng (San Miguel)
1993	North All-Stars	149–129	South All-Stars	Cuneta Astrodome	Pasay	Allan Caidic (San Miguel)
1994	North All-Stars	133–124	South All-Stars	Cuneta Astrodome (2)	Pasay	Benjie Paras (Shell)
1995	Veterans	112–107	Rookies-Sophomores-Juniors	Cuneta Astrodome (3)	Pasay	Vergel Meneses (Sunkist)
1996	Rookies-Sophomores-Juniors	131–115	Veterans	Cuneta Astrodome (4)	Pasay	Kenneth Duremdes (Sunkist)
1997	Rookies-Sophomores-Juniors	126–123	Veterans	Cuneta Astrodome (5)	Pasay	Bal David (Gordon's Gin)
1998	Philippine Centennial Team	114–109	PBA All-Stars	Cebu Coliseum	Cebu City	—
1998	Philippine Centennial Team	107–92	PBA All-Stars	Cuneta Astrodome	Pasay	Vergel Meneses (2) (Pop Cola)
1999	Veterans	91–85	Rookies-Sophomores-Juniors	PhilSports Arena (5)	Pasig	Benjie Paras (2) (Shell)
2000	Veterans	93–78	Rookies-Sophomores-Juniors	University of San Agustin Gym	Iloilo	Vergel Meneses (3) (Barangay Ginebra)
2001	Veterans	112–105	Rookies-Sophomores-Juniors	Araneta Coliseum	Quezon City	Danny Ildefonso (San Miguel)
2002	Not held					
2003	Governors' All-Stars	124–122	Commissioner's All-Stars	Araneta Coliseum (2)	Quezon City	Vergel Meneses (4) (FedEx)
2004	South All-Stars	130–128	North All-Stars	Cebu Coliseum (2)	Cebu City	Asi Taulava (Talk 'N Text); Jimmy Alapag (Talk 'N Text) (co-winners)
2005	North All-Stars	131–128	South All-Stars	Ilocos Norte Centennial Arena	Laoag	Jayjay Helterbrand (Barangay Ginebra)
2006	South All-Stars	122–120	North All-Stars	Xavier University Gym	Cagayan de Oro	Asi Taulava (2) (Talk 'N Text)
2007	North All-Stars	145–142	South All-Stars	University of Baguio Gym	Baguio	Jayjay Helterbrand (2) (Barangay Ginebra); Willie Miller (Alaska) (co-winners)
2008	South All-Stars	163–158 (OT)***	North All-Stars	West Negros University Gym	Bacolod	Peter June Simon (Purefoods)
2009	PBA All-Stars	97–89	Powerade-Team Pilipinas	Araneta Coliseum (3)	Quezon City	David Noel** (Barangay Ginebra)
2010	North All-Stars	133–130	South All-Stars	Puerto Princesa City Coliseum	Puerto Princesa	Gabe Norwood (Rain or Shine)
2011	North All-Stars	133–129	South All-Stars	Boracay Convention Center	Boracay	Marc Pingris (B-Meg Derby Ace)
2012	Veterans	176–144	Rookies-Sophomores-Juniors	Ilocos Norte Centennial Arena (2)	Laoag	James Yap (B-Meg)
2013	PBA All-Stars	124–124 (Draw)	Gilas Pilipinas	Davao del Sur Coliseum	Digos	Arwind Santos (Petron Blaze) and Jeff Chan (Rain or Shine)
2014	Gilas Pilipinas	101–93	PBA All-Stars	Mall of Asia Arena	Pasay	Gary David (Meralco)
2015	North All-Stars	166–161	South All-Stars	Puerto Princesa City Coliseum (2)	Puerto Princesa	Terrence Romeo (GlobalPort)
2016	North All-Stars	154–151	South All-Stars	Smart Araneta Coliseum (4)	Quezon City	Alex Cabagnot (San Miguel)
2017	PBA Mindanao All-Stars	114–114 (Draw)	Gilas Pilipinas	Xavier University Gym (2)	Cagayan de Oro	Troy Rosario (TNT) and Matthew Wright (Phoenix)
2017	Gilas Pilipinas	122–111	PBA Luzon All-Stars	Quezon Convention Center	Lucena	Matthew Wright (2) (Phoenix)
2017	Gilas Pilipinas	125–112	PBA Visayas All-Stars	Hoops Dome	Lapu-Lapu City	Terrence Romeo (2) (GlobalPort)
2018	PBA Mindanao All-Stars	144–130	Smart All-Stars	Davao del Sur Coliseum (2)	Digos	Baser Amer (Meralco)
2018	Smart All-Stars	152–149	PBA Luzon All-Stars	Batangas City Sports Coliseum	Batangas City	Terrence Romeo (3) (TNT)
2018	PBA Visayas All-Stars	157–141	Smart All-Stars	University of San Agustin Gym (2)	Iloilo City	Jeff Chan (2) (Phoenix)
2019	North All-Stars	185–170	South All-Stars	Calasiao Sports Complex	Calasiao	Arwind Santos (2) (San Miguel); Japeth Aguilar (Barangay Ginebra) (co-winners)
2020–22	Not held due to the COVID-19 pandemic					
2023	Team Japeth	140–136	Team Scottie	City of Passi Arena	Passi	Paul Lee (Magnolia)
2024	Team Japeth	140–140 (Draw)	Team Mark	La Salle Coliseum	Bacolod	Japeth Aguilar (2) (Barangay Ginebra) and Robert Bolick (NLEX) (co-winners)
2025	Cancelled due to "security concerns" (Veterans v. Rookies-Sophomores-Juniors)			—	Panabo	—
2026	North All-Stars	147–142	South All-Stars	Candon City Arena	Candon	Japeth Aguilar (3) (Barangay Ginebra)
2027				TBA	Cagayan de Oro	—

- * MVP from losing team
- ** MVP was Import Player.
- *** The two teams requested for an overtime period to be held.

=== Head-to-head results ===
Format	Results
Rookies-Sophomores-Juniors vs. Veterans	Veterans lead, 7–2 in all-time series
North All-Stars vs. South All-Stars	North All-Stars lead, 10–4 in all-time series
PBA All-Stars vs. Philippine National Team	Philippine NT lead, 6–3–2 in all-time series
