= PBA season 50 draft =

40th edition of the PBA draft

General information
- Date: September 7, 2025
- Location: SM Mall of Asia
- Networks: One Sports (RPTV, PBA Rush, Pilipinas Live)

Overview
- League: Philippine Basketball Association
- First selection: Geo Chiu (Terrafirma Dyip)

The PBA season 50 draft was the 40th edition of the PBA draft and the draft for the 2025–26 PBA season. The draft took place on September 7, 2025, at SM Mall of Asia Music Hall in Pasay, marking the first time the event was held at an SM mall.

The Terrafirma Dyip made the first overall pick after finishing with a weighted cumulative ranking of 11.7 in the 2024–25 season. The team used the pick to select Geo Chiu.

== Draft order ==
The draft order was based on each team's overall rankings across all three conferences in the previous season. Rankings from both the 2024 Governors' Cup and 2024–25 Commissioner's Cup each make up 30% of the average while the 2025 Philippine Cup has the most weight at 40%. Guest teams are excluded when calculating rankings. In each round, teams picked in ascending order (lowest to highest) based on their respective weighted cumulative rankings.

The NorthPort Batang Pier continued to make their selections in this draft while their franchise sale to Pureblends was under review at the time.

Draft order	Team	Final ranking			Total
Draft order	Team	GOV	COM	PHI	Total
1st	Terrafirma Dyip	11th	12th	12th	11.7
2nd	Phoenix Fuel Masters	12th	11th	9th	10.5
3rd	Blackwater Bossing	9th	10th	10th	9.7
4th	NorthPort Batang Pier	10th	3rd	11th	8.3
5th	NLEX Road Warriors	8th	8th	5th	6.8
6th	Magnolia Chicken Timplados Hotshots	7th	7th	6th	6.6
7th	Meralco Bolts	5th	6th	8th	6.5
8th	Converge FiberXers	6th	5th	7th	6.1
9th	San Miguel Beermen	4th	9th	1st	4.3
10th	Rain or Shine Elasto Painters	3rd	4th	4th	3.7
11th	Barangay Ginebra San Miguel	2nd	2nd	3rd	2.4
12th	TNT Tropang 5G	1st	1st	2nd	1.4

== Draft selections ==
PG	Point guard	SG	Shooting guard	SF	Small forward	PF	Power forward	C	Center

*	Denotes player who has been selected for at least one Mythical Team
^{#}	Denotes player who has been selected for at least one All-Star Game

=== First round ===
Pick	Player	Pos.	Country of birth	Team	School / club team
1	Geo Chiu	C	Philippines	Terrafirma Dyip	Ateneo / Abra Solid North Weavers (MPBL)
2	Juan Gómez de Liaño^{#}	PG/SG	Philippines	Converge FiberXers (from Phoenix Fuel Masters) (Note: September 5, 2025: Phoenix to Converge: Converge acquired a S50 first-round pick and an S51 second-round pick; Phoenix acquired Bryan Santos and a S50 first-round pick)	UP / Seoul SK Knights (KBL)
3	Dalph Panopio	PG	Italy	Blackwater Bossing	Cal State Baskersfield / Mumbai Titans (INBL)
4	Chris Koon	SF/SG	United States	NorthPort Batang Pier	Ateneo
5	Ljay Gonzales	PG	Philippines	NLEX Road Warriors	FEU / Quezon Huskers (MPBL)
6	Yukien Andrada	PF	Philippines	Magnolia Chicken Timplados Hotshots	San Beda
7	Jason Brickman	PG	United States	Meralco Bolts	LIU Brooklyn / Abra Solid North Weavers (MPBL)
8	Will Gozum	PF	Philippines	Phoenix Fuel Masters (from Converge FiberXers)	Benilde / Quezon Huskers (MPBL)
9	Chris Miller	SG	United States	San Miguel Beermen	Salem / Darbandikhan (IPBL)
10	Christian Manaytay	PF/C	Philippines	Rain or Shine Elasto Painters	UST / Nueva Ecija Rice Vanguards (MPBL)
11	Sonny Estil	SF	Philippines	Barangay Ginebra San Miguel	Letran / Pampanga Giant Lanterns (MPBL)
12	Jun Roque	SF	Philippines	Rain or Shine Elasto Painters (from TNT) (Note: September 21, 2023: TNT to Rain or Shine: Rain or Shine acquired Dave Marcelo and a S50 first-round pick; TNT acquired Henry Galinato and Jewel Ponferada)	Letran

=== Second round ===
Pick	Player	Pos.	Country of birth	Team	School / club team
13	Mario Barasi	C	Philippines	Barangay Ginebra San Miguel (from Terrafirma) (Note: July 17, 2024: Terrafirma to Barangay Ginebra: Barangay Ginebra acquired a S50 second-round pick; Terrafirma acquired the draft rights to Didat Hanapi (S49 No. 17) and Paolo Hernandez (S49 No. 22))	Adamson / Basilan Starhorse (MPBL)
14	Dave Ando	C	Philippines	Phoenix Fuel Masters	UST / Ilagan Isabela Cowboys (MPBL)
15	Ximone Sandagon	PF/C	Philippines	Blackwater Bossing	FEU / Quezon Huskers (MPBL)
16	CJ Austria	SG/SF	Philippines	NorthPort Batang Pier (from NorthPort via San Miguel) (Note: September 20, 2022: San Miguel to NorthPort (three-team trade with Barangay Ginebra): NorthPort acquired Von Pessumal; San Miguel acquired S50 and S51 second-round picks) (Note: April 2, 2025: NorthPort to San Miguel: San Miguel acquired J. M. Calma; NorthPort re-acquired its S50 second-round pick and acquired Avan Nava)	De La Salle / Abra Solid North Weavers (MPBL)
17	Arvin Gamboa	SF/PF	Philippines	NLEX Road Warriors	Mapúa / San Juan Knights (MPBL)
18	Shawn Umali	C/PF	Philippines	Terrafirma Dyip (from Magnolia) (Note: August 22, 2025: Magnolia to Terrafirma: Terrafirma acquired Jerrick Ahanmisi and a S50 second-round pick; Magnolia acquired the player rights to Javi Gómez de Liaño)	Benilde
19	Vince Magbuhos	PF/C	Italy	Meralco Bolts	Adamson / Quezon Huskers (MPBL)
20	Mark Omega	C	Philippines	Rain or Shine Elasto Painters (from Converge, rights reverted back to Converge) (Note: May 8, 2023: Converge to Rain or Shine: Rain or Shine acquired S49 and S50 second-round picks; Converge acquired Mike Nieto) (Note: October 2, 2025: Rain or Shine to Converge: Rain or Shine acquired Converge's 2028 (S52) second round pick; Converge acquired the rights of Mark Omega)	Letran
21	Kobe Monje	SF	Philippines	Converge FiberXers (from San Miguel) (Note: June 6, 2022: San Miguel to Converge: Converge acquired S49 and S50 second-round picks; San Miguel acquired Robbie Herndon)	Letran / Val City Magic (MPBL)
22	Deo Cuajao	SG	Philippines	Rain or Shine Elasto Painters	Letran
23	John Abis	SF	Philippines	Barangay Ginebra San Miguel	Perpetual
24	Joshua David	PG	Philippines	Rain or Shine Elasto Painters (from TNT via Blackwater) (Note: March 11, 2021: TNT to Blackwater (three-team trade with NLEX): Blackwater acquired David Semerad, Simon Enciso, S49 TNT first-round pick, and S50 TNT second-round pick; TNT acquired a S46 first-round pick; NLEX acquired Don Trollano, Roi Sumang, Maurice Shaw, and S48 second-round pick (via Blackwater)) (Note: February 14, 2024: Blackwater to Rain or Shine: Rain or Shine acquired S49 first-round pick (via Blackwater) and S50 second-round pick (via Blackwater); Blackwater acquired Rey Nambatac)	De La Salle / Abra Solid North Weavers (MPBL)

=== Third round ===
From the third round onwards, teams will have the option to pass. Doing so will opt the team out for the remainder of the draft. The draft ends once all twelve teams have passed.

Pick	Player	Pos.	Country of birth	Team	School / club team
25	Orin Catacutan	SG/SF	Philippines	Terrafirma Dyip	UE / Sarangani Gripper Motorcycle Tire (MPBL)
26	Harvey Pagsanjan	SG/PG	Philippines	Phoenix Fuel Masters	EAC / Pangasinan Heatwaves (MPBL)
27	Jack Cruz-Dumont	SG/SF	Philippines	Blackwater Bossing	UE / Abra Solid North Weavers (MPBL)
28	Mark Sangco	PF/SF	Philippines	NorthPort Batang Pier	Benilde / Pasay Voyagers (MPBL)
29	Lorenz Capulong	C	Philippines	NLEX Road Warriors	Arellano / Bataan Risers (MPBL)
30	Gab Gomez	PG	Italy	Magnolia Chicken Timplados Hotshots	Ateneo / Ilagan Isabela Cowboys (MPBL)
31	Ethan Galang	SG/SF	United States	Meralco Bolts	UE / Mindoro Tamaraws (MPBL)
32	Tony Ynot	SG	Philippines	Converge FiberXers	Benilde
33	Royce Mantua	SF/SG	Australia	San Miguel Beermen	Adamson
34	Cole Micek	PG	United States	Rain or Shine Elasto Painters	St. Francis / Macau Black Bears (TAT)
35	Sean Quitevis	SG	Philippines	TNT Tropang 5G	Ateneo / Ilagan Isabela Cowboys (MPBL)

- Barangay Ginebra passed during the round.

=== Fourth round ===
Pick	Player	Pos.	Country of birth	Team	School / club team
36	Dolan Adlawan	PF	Philippines	Terrafirma Dyip	USC / Cebu Greats (MPBL)
37	Aldave Canoy	SG/SF	Philippines	Phoenix Fuel Masters	CSAV
38	James Una	PF	Philippines	Blackwater Bossing	San Sebastian / Zamboanga Sikat (MPBL)
39	Bryan Sajonia	PG/SG	Philippines	NorthPort Batang Pier	San Beda
40	Judel Fuentes	SG	Philippines	NLEX Road Warriors	CEU / Quezon Huskers (MPBL)
41	Joshua Yerro	SG	Philippines	Magnolia Chicken Timplados Hotshots	Adamson / Quezon Huskers (MPBL)
42	Ladis Lepalam	C	Philippines	Meralco Bolts	Benilde / Muntinlupa Cagers (MPBL)
43	JM Manalang	PF	Philippines	Converge FiberXers	UE / Quezon City Galeries Taipan (MPBL)
44	Justine Guevarra	PF	Philippines	San Miguel Beermen	UE / Bacolod Tubo Slashers (MPBL)
45	Kyle Tolentino	SG/SF	United States	Rain or Shine Elasto Painters	Letran / GenSan Warriors (MPBL)
46	Joe Celzo	PF	Philippines	TNT Tropang 5G	San Beda

=== Fifth round ===
Pick	Player	Pos.	Country of birth	Team	School / club team
47	Royce Alforque	PG	Philippines	Terrafirma Dyip	FEU / San Juan Knights (MPBL)
48	King Gurtiza	SG	Philippines	Phoenix Fuel Masters	EAC / Pangasinan Heatwaves (MPBL)
49	Dominic Panlilio	PG	Philippines	Blackwater Bossing	Benilde / RCP–Shawarma Shack Demigods (PSL)
50	JJ Gesalem	PG/SG	Philippines	NorthPort Batang Pier	UST / Val City Magic (MPBL)
51	Herrald Benedictos	SF/SG	Philippines	NLEX Road Warriors	Bulacan State / Bulacan Kuyas (MPBL)
52	Jeff Comia	SG	Philippines	Meralco Bolts	New Era / Davao Occidental Tigers (MPBL)
53	JP Cauilan	PF/SF	Philippines	Converge FiberXers	NU / Zamboanga Sikat (MPBL)
54	Axel Iñigo	PG	Philippines	San Miguel Beermen	FEU / Mindoro Tamaraws (MPBL)
55	MJ dela Virgen	PG	Philippines	Rain or Shine Elasto Painters	JRU / Batangas City Tanduay Rum Masters (MPBL)

- Magnolia and TNT passed during the round.

=== Sixth round ===
Pick	Player	Pos.	Country of birth	Team	School / club team
56	JM Bravo	SF/PF	Philippines	Terrafirma Dyip	Lyceum
57	Gjerard Wilson	PG	United States	Blackwater Bossing	UE
58	Jonas Tibayan	PF	Philippines	NorthPort Batang Pier	NU / Mindoro Tamaraws (MPBL)
59	Tutoy Ramirez	PG/SG	Philippines	NLEX Road Warriors	ICC / Bataan Risers (MPBL)
60	Raphael Mallari	PG/SG	Philippines	Converge FiberXers	Adamson
61	Jacey Cruz	PG	Philippines	San Miguel Beermen	Qatar

- Phoenix, Meralco, and Rain or Shine passed during the round.

=== Seventh round ===
Pick	Player	Pos.	Country of birth	Team	School / club team
62	Ira Bataller	PF	Philippines	Terrafirma Dyip	Letran / Manila Batang Quiapo (MPBL)
63	Jude Codiñera	SG	Philippines	Blackwater Bossing	UST / Muntinlupa Cagers (MPBL)
64	Kobe Pableo	PF/C	Philippines	NorthPort Batang Pier	LCCM
65	AJ Madrigal	SG/SF	Philippines	NLEX Road Warriors	UP / Iloilo United Royals (MPBL)
66	Jordan Sta. Ana	PG/SG	Philippines	Converge FiberXers	Arellano / Quezon City Galeries Taipan (MPBL)

- San Miguel passed during the round.

=== Eighth round ===
Pick	Player	Pos.	Country of birth	Team	School / club team
67	Claude Camit	PG/SG	Philippines	Terrafirma Dyip	UB
68	Kenny Rocacurva	SG	Philippines	NorthPort Batang Pier	Letran / Biñan Tatak Gel (MPBL)
69	John Galinato	PG/SG	Philippines	NLEX Road Warriors	NU / San Juan Knights (MPBL)
70	Geremy Robinson	SG/PG	United States	Converge FiberXers	UST

- Blackwater passed during the round.

=== Ninth round ===
Pick	Player	Pos.	Country of birth	Team	School / club team
71	Tristan Medina	SG	Philippines	Terrafirma Dyip	Pasig Catholic
72	Kint Ariar	SF	Philippines	NorthPort Batang Pier	Letran / Imus Braderhood (MPBL)
73	Patrick Ramos	PG	United States	Converge FiberXers	JRU / Muntinlupa Cagers (MPBL)

- NLEX passed during the round.

=== Tenth round ===
Pick	Player	Pos.	Country of birth	Team	School / club team
74	Franz Diaz	PG	Philippines	Terrafirma Dyip	CEU
75	Robi Nayve	PG	Philippines	NorthPort Batang Pier	Benilde / Rizal Golden Coolers (MPBL)
76	Niel Tolentino	PG/SG	Philippines	Converge FiberXers	Arellano

=== Eleventh round ===
Pick	Player	Pos.	Country of birth	Team	School / club team
77	Tricky Peromingan	PG/SG	Philippines	NorthPort Batang Pier	Adamson / Davao Occidental Tigers (MPBL)

- Terrafirma and Converge passed during the round.

=== Twelfth round ===
- NorthPort, the last remaining team, passed during the round, thus ending the draft.

== Trades involving draft picks ==
=== Pre-draft trades ===
Prior to the draft, the following trades were made and resulted in exchanges of draft picks between teams.

=== Post-draft trades ===
Following the draft, trades between rookies were made and resulted in draftees getting traded to another team.

== Combine ==
The 2025 PBA draft combine was held from September 4–5 at Ynares Sports Arena in Pasig. 125 of the 128 initial applicants showed up to the event, with two withdrawing from the draft, while Jason Brickman was unable to make it due to prior commitments. Sonny Estil was named the draft combine MVP as his team won the mini-tournament, and he, Dalph Panopio, Edrian Ramirez, Jun Roque, and Mario Barasi were named to the all-tournament team.

== Eligibility and entrants ==
Applications for the draft began on August 4 and ended on August 29. On August 22, the PBA reached out to the University Athletic Association of the Philippines (UAAP) to allow its student-athletes to join the draft. The UAAP rejected the league's request on August 27. By the end of the application period, 128 players declared for the draft. This was reduced to a final tally of 122 players after the draft combine.

The following are the eligibility requirements for local players:

- Entrants at least 22 years old on the day of the draft must be four years removed from high school or have played one year of college basketball;
- Entrants between the ages of 19 and 21 years must have had at least two years of college education;
- All entrants must be at least 5 feet 6 inches (1.68 m) in height.

Eligibility requirements for Filipino-foreigner entrants are similar to the locals but with some additions:

- All Filipino-foreigner entrants must be a holder of a Philippine passport.
- All Filipino-foreigner entrants must have previously played professional basketball elsewhere and is not under contract with other teams.

Players who applied for the draft on the fourth or fifth year of eligibility will instead be assigned to a lottery separate from draft proper.

=== Notable entrants ===
==== Domestic league players ====
In this section, only entrants who have played for a UAAP, NCAA, CESAFI, or U.S. NCAA school are included. Additionally, all listed entrants have played in the Maharlika Pilipinas Basketball League prior to the draft unless specified.

- Dolan Adlawan – F, USC / Cebu Greats
- Royce Alforque – G, FEU / San Juan Knights
- Dave Ando – C, UST / Ilagan Isabela Cowboys
- Ashon Andrews – F/C, UP / Mindoro Tamaraws
- Kint Ariar – F, Letran / Imus Braderhood
- CJ Austria – G, De La Salle / Abra Solid North Weavers
- Mario Barasi – C, Adamson / Basilan Starhorse
- Ira Bataller – F, Letran / Manila Batang Quiapo
- Allan Beltran – F/C, UE / Davao Occidental Tigers
- Jason Brickman – G, LIU Brooklyn / Abra Solid North Weavers
- Lorenz Capulong – C, Arellano / Bataan Risers
- Aurin Catacutan – G/F, UE / Sarangani Gripper Motorcycle Tire
- JP Cauilan – F, NU / Zamboanga Sikat
- Jason Celis – G, JRU / RCP–Shawarma Shack Demigods (PSL)
- Geo Chiu – C, Ateneo / Abra Solid North Weavers
- Jude Codinera – F, UST / Muntinlupa Cagers
- Jack Cruz-Dumont – G, UE / Abra Solid North Weavers
- Jasper Cuevas – G, Perpetual / Parañaque Patriots
- Greg Cunanan – G, Lyceum / Quezon City Galeries Taipan
- Joshua David – G, De La Salle / Abra Solid North Weavers
- MJ dela Virgen – G, JRU / Batangas City Tanduay Rum Masters
- Sonny Estil – F, Letran / Pampanga Giant Lanterns
- Reggz Gabat – G, San Sebastian / Zamboanga Sikat
- Ethan Galang – F, UE / Mindoro Tamaraws
- John Galinato – G, NU / San Juan Knights
- Arvin Gamboa – F, Mapúa / San Juan Knights
- JJ Gesalem – G, UST / Val City Magic
- Gab Gomez – G, Ateneo / Ilagan Isabela Cowboys
- Ljay Gonzales – G, FEU / Quezon Huskers
- Will Gozum – F/C, Benilde / Quezon Huskers
- Justine Guevarra – F, UE / Bacolod Tubo Slashers
- King Gurtiza – G, EAC / Pangasinan Heatwaves
- Axel Iñigo – G, FEU / Mindoro Tamaraws
- Chester Sera Josef – F/C, San Sebastian / Quezon City Galeries Taipan
- Ladis Lepalam – C, Benilde / Muntinlupa Cagers
- AJ Madrigal – G/F, UP / Iloilo United Royals
- Vince Magbuhos – F, Adamson / Quezon Huskers
- John Matthew Manalang – F, UE / Quezon City Galeries Taipan
- Christian Manaytay – F, UST / Nueva Ecija Rice Vanguards
- Joshua Marcos – G/F, Benilde / Ilagan Isabela Cowboys
- Kobe Monje – F, Letran / Val City Magic
- Robi Nayve – G, Benilde / Rizal Golden Coolers
- Dawn Ochea – F, Adamson / Batangas City Tanduay Rum Masters
- Harvey Pagsanjan – G/F, EAC / Pangasinan Heatwaves
- Dominic Panlilio – G, Benilde / RCP–Shawarma Shack Demigods (PSL)
- Trciky Peromingan – G, Adamson / Davao Occidental Tigers
- Paolo Quiminales – F/C, JRU / 1Munti (PSL)
- Sean Quitevis – G, Ateneo / Ilagan Isabela Cowboys
- Patrick Ramos – G, JRU / Muntinlupa Cagers
- Kenny Rocacurva – G, Letran / Biñan Tatak Gel
- Ximone Sandagon – F/C, FEU / Quezon Huskers
- Mark Sangco – F, Benilde / Pasay Voyagers
- Alfred Sedillo – G/F, San Beda / Manila Batang Quiapo
- Jordan Sta. Ana – G, Arellano / Quezon City Galeries Taipan
- Jason Strait – F, UE / Quezon City Galeries Taipan
- James Tempra – F, FEU / Basilan Starhorse
- Jonas Tibayan – F/C, De La Salle / Mindoro Tamaraws
- Kyle Tolentino – G, Letran / GenSan Warriors
- Niel Tolentino – G/F, Arellano / Rizal Golden Coolers
- James Una – F/C, San Sebastian / Zamboanga Sikat
- Jerick Villanueva – C, UE / Bacolod Tubo Slashers
- Joshua Yerro – G, Adamson / Quezon Huskers

==== International league players ====
- Jacey Cruz – G, Qatar University / Qatar SC (Qatar)
- Juan Gómez de Liaño – G, UP / Seoul SK Knights (South Korea)
- Cole Micek – G, St. Francis / Macau Black Bears (TAT)
- Chris Miller – G, Salem / Darbandikhan (Iraq)
- Dalph Panopio – G, Cal State Baskersfield / Mumbai Titans (India)
- Anthony Sevilla – G, Karel de Grote / CB Penya Roja (Spain (FBCV))

==== UAAP and NCAA players ====
- John Abis – F, Perpetual
- Yukien Andrada – F, San Beda
- John Barba – G, Lyceum
- JM Bravo – F, Lyceum
- Joe Celzo – C, San Beda
- Gab Cometa – G, Benilde
- Deo Cuajao – G, Letran
- Aaron Flowers – F, Adamson
- Jake Gaspay – F, Benilde
- Chris Koon – G/F, Ateneo
- Raphael Mallari – G, Adamson
- Royce Mantua – F, Adamson
- Mark Omega – C, Letran
- Geremy Robinson Jr. – G, UST
- Jun Roque – G/F, Letran
- Bryan Sajonia – G, San Beda
- Joshua Tagala – G, San Beda
- Shawn Umali – C/F, Benilde
- Gjerard Wilson – G, UE
- Tony Ynot – G, Benilde

==== U.S. NCAA players ====
- Isaiah Africano – F, Pacific University
