= Juan Gómez de Liaño =

Filipino basketball player (born 1999)

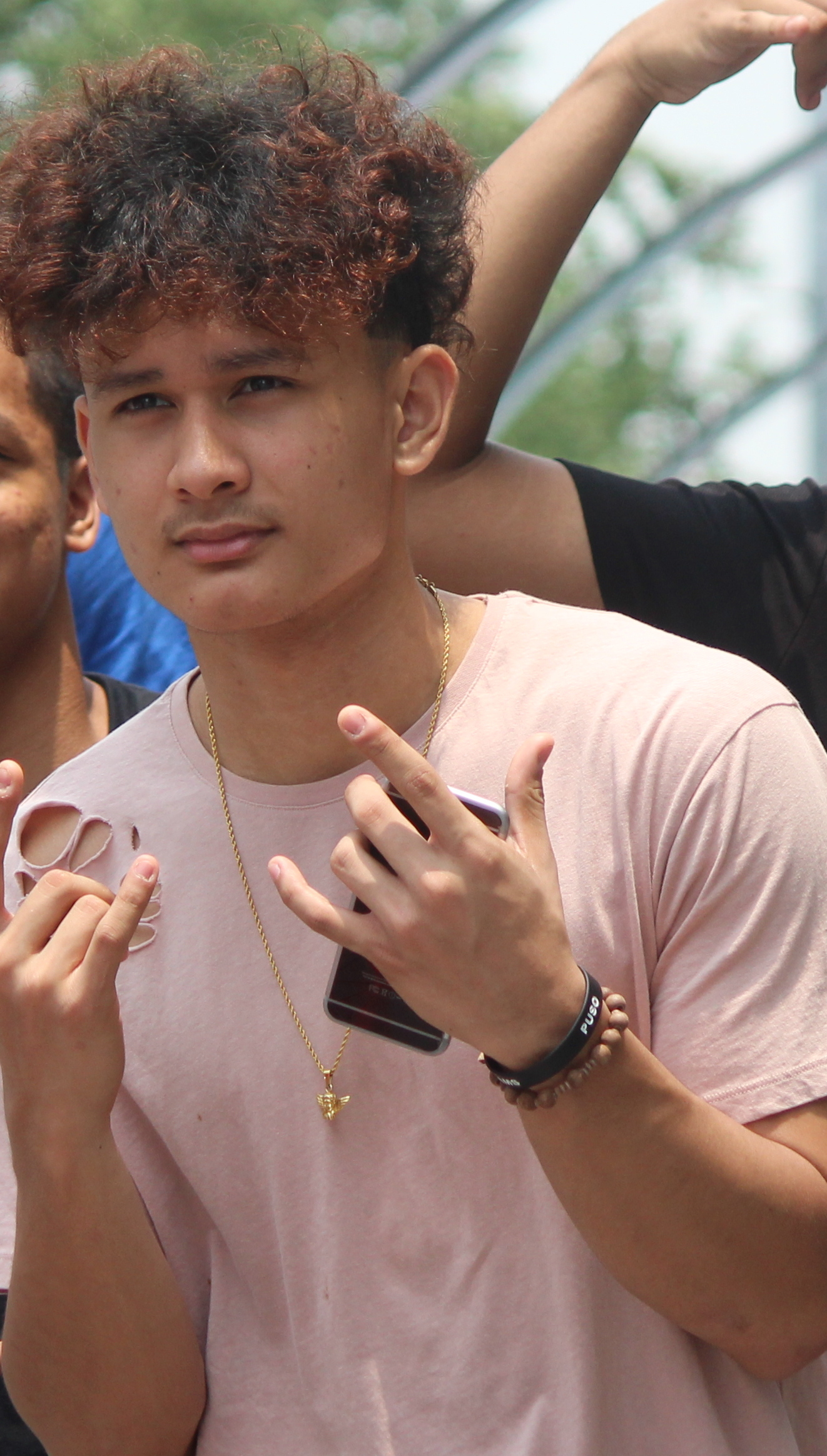
- Gómez de Liaño in 2017

No. 1 – Converge FiberXers
- Position: Point guard / shooting guard
- League: PBA

Personal information
- Born: November 19, 1999 (age 26) Mandaluyong, Philippines
- Listed height: 6 ft 0 in (1.83 m)
- Listed weight: 163 lb (74 kg)

Career information
- High school: UPIS (Quezon City, Philippines)
- College: UP (2017–2019)
- PBA draft: 2025: 1st round, 2nd overall pick
- Drafted by: Converge FiberXers
- Playing career: 2021–present

Career history
- 2021: Earthfriends Tokyo Z
- 2022–2023: BC Wolves
- 2023–2025: Seoul SK Knights
- 2025–present: Converge FiberXers

Career highlights
- PBA All-Star (2026); PBA D-League Most Valuable Player (2022 Aspirants'); UAAP Mythical Team (2018); UAAP Rookie of the Year (2017)

Juan Gerardo Sison Gómez de Liaño (born November 19, 1999), also known as Juan GDL, is a Filipino professional basketball player for the Converge FiberXers of the Philippine Basketball Association (PBA). Gómez de Liaño played for the University of the Philippines Fighting Maroons of the UAAP during his collegiate career. He plays the point guard and shooting guard positions. He is listed at 6 ft 0 in (1.82 m)

Following his collegiate career and multiple stints at the amateur level and in 3x3, he spent the next four years playing overseas in the B. League, Lithuanian Basketball League (LKL), and Korean Basketball League (KBL). In 2025, he returned to Philippine basketball after getting drafted by the Converge FiberXers with the second overall pick of the PBA season 50 draft.

== Early life ==
Juan was born on November 19, 1999, in Mandaluyong, Philippines. He is the third of six siblings, five of them are into basketball. His older brother, Javi, plays for the Magnolia Hotshots of the Philippine Basketball Association, while his older brother, Joe, was drafted 59th overall by the Phoenix Super LPG Fuel Masters during the PBA season 48 draft.

== Collegiate career ==
=== UAAP Season 80 (2017) ===
Gómez de Liaño's rookie season was in 2017 in which he won Rookie of the Year, a year after getting the Most Valuable Player award at the junior level. He also got the MVP award in 2016 playing in the Philippine Chinese Amateur Basketball League Freego Cup.

=== UAAP Season 81 (2018) ===
This was a breakout year for Gómez de Liaño as he brought the UP Fighting Maroons to the UAAP Finals after thirty-two years. The awards given to Juan that year were: Playmaker of the Season (with a rare triple double), Mythical 5, Assist Leader and Second in Scoring.

=== UAAP Season 82 (2019) ===
In his last season with the Maroons, Gómez de Liaño was able to help the team finish third.

== Amateur and 3x3 career ==
=== Dubai International Basketball Tournament ===
In 2019, Gómez de Liaño played point guard alongside teammates Justin Brownlee, Lamar Odom, and was coached by Charles Tiu under the Mighty Sports team, who went far until the semi-final round.

In 2020, Gómez de Liaño finally bagged the championship for Mighty Sports coached once again by Charles Tiu. His notable teammates were ex-NBA players Renaldo Balkman and Andray Blatche.

=== PBA D-League ===
In 2020, Gómez de Liaño played for a couple of games for Marinerong Pilipino before being called up for the Philippine national team.

In 2022, Gómez de Liaño was awarded the MVP of the Aspirant's Cup while playing again for Marinerong Pilipino. He steered the team to the finals but eventually lost to the Eco Oil-La Salle Green Archers.

=== Chooks-to-Go Pilipinas 3x3 (2021) ===
Representing Nueva Ecija Rice Vanguards in his first 3x3 tournament, Gómez de Liaño was able to lead the team to the finals against the Philippine National Team under Chooks-to-Go.

=== ASEAN Basketball League (2022) ===
Gómez de Liaño's team, Platinum Karaoke, placed third in the 3x3 tournament held in Indonesia. He also played for the BBM CLS Knights where they awarded the preseason champions.

== Professional career ==
=== Earthfriends Tokyo Z (2021) ===
On June 23, 2021, Gómez de Liaño signed with Earthfriends Tokyo Z of the B2 League. He was also selected as part of the B.League Rising Stars. At the same time, his older brother Javi played in the same league for the Ibaraki Robots.

=== BC Wolves (2022–2023) ===
After a stint with Marinerong Pilipino in the PBA D-League, Gómez de Liaño then signed with the BC Wolves for their LKL campaign on October 20, 2022.

=== Seoul SK Knights (2023–2025) ===
On June 20, 2023, Gómez de Liaño signed a three-year contract, with the third year being a player option, with Seoul SK Knights of the Korean Basketball League. On May 30, 2025, the Knights dropped Gómez de Liaño after the team acquired Arvin Tolentino. The team subsequently bought out the remaining year of Juan's contract.

=== Converge FiberXers (2025–present) ===
On August 26, 2025, Juan declared for the PBA season 50 draft. On September 7, he was drafted by the Converge FiberXers with the second overall pick. Six days later, on September 13, he signed a three-year rookie contract with the team.

== Career statistics ==
Legend
GP	Games played	GS	Games started	MPG	Minutes per game
FG%	Field goal percentage	3P%	3-point field goal percentage	FT%	Free throw percentage
RPG	Rebounds per game	APG	Assists per game	SPG	Steals per game
BPG	Blocks per game	PPG	Points per game		Led the league

=== Domestic leagues ===
As of the end of 2024–25 season

Year	Team	League	GP	MPG	FG%	3P%	FT%	RPG	APG	SPG	BPG	PPG
2021–22	(Japan) Earthfriends Tokyo Z	B2.League	17	16.3	.352	.200	.261	2.2	2.4	.5	.1	5.3
2022–23	(Lithuania) BC Wolves	LKL	7	5.2	.364	.286	1.000	1.1	0.6	.1	.1	3.0
2023–24	(South Korea) Seoul SK Knights	KBL	17	11.1	.472	.292	.429	1.8	1.6	.5	.1	4.6
2024–25	(South Korea) Seoul SK Knights	KBL	36	8.4	.432	.323	.556	1.5	1.1	.4	.0	3.2

== National team career ==
=== Junior national team ===
Gómez de Liaño played for the Philippines on the 2015 FIBA Asia Under-16 Championship in Indonesia and were champions in the SEABA.

He also played in the 2017 FIBA 3x3 U18 World Cup in China.

=== Senior national team ===
He played for the first and second windows of the 2022 FIBA Asia Cup qualification against Indonesia and Thailand. His averages were 12 points, 3 assists and 3 rebounds. On the second FIBA window, he had the chance to play with his brother Javi where he averaged double-digit points a game. Both were named players of the game.

Gómez de Liaño was called again to represent the national team for the third window of the 2023 FIBA Basketball World Cup qualification against New Zealand and India.

In 2026, Gómez de Liaño was called up to the national team after several years. In his first game back, he had 10 points and two assists in a loss to New Zealand. In a rematch against them during the third window of 2027 FIBA Basketball World Cup qualification, he led with 23 points, six rebounds, and five assists in a double-overtime loss. He then led the team in scoring with 16 points and three rebounds off the bench in a win over Iran.

== Awards and accomplishments ==
=== Professional ===
- PBA All-Star (2026)

=== Amateur ===
- PBA D-League Most Valuable Player (2022 Aspirants')
- PBA D-League Scoring Leader (2022 Aspirants')
- PBA D-League Assist Leader (2022 Aspirants')

=== Collegiate and high school ===
- UAAP seniors' Mythical Team (2018)
- UAAP seniors' Rookie of the Year (2017)
- UAAP seniors' Playmaker of the Season (2018)
- UAAP seniors' assist leader
- UAAP juniors' tournament MVP (2017)
- UAAP juniors' tournament Mythical Team (2017)
- NBTC Most Valuable Player (2016)
- SLAM Rising Stars Classic Most Valuable Player (2016)
- PCABL Summer Most Valuable Player (2016)
