= Vince Magbuhos =

Filipino basketball player (born 1999)

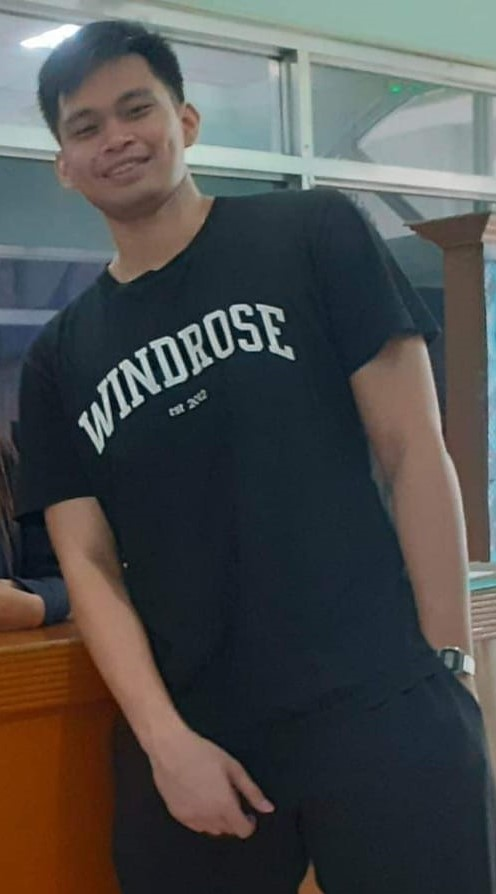
- Magbuhos in 2023

No. 93 – Meralco Bolts
- Position: Power forward / center
- League: PBA

Personal information
- Born: October 7, 1999 (age 27) Rome, Italy
- Listed height: 6 ft 5 in (1.96 m)

Career information
- College: Adamson (2018–2023)
- PBA draft: 2025: 2nd round, 19th overall pick
- Drafted by: Meralco Bolts
- Playing career: 2024–present

Career history
- 2024: Nueva Ecija Rice Vanguards
- 2025: Quezon Huskers
- 2026–present: Meralco Bolts

Vince Gunda Magbuhos (born October 7, 1999) is an Italian-born Filipino professional basketball player for the Meralco Bolts of the Philippine Basketball Association (PBA). He played college basketball for the Adamson Soaring Falcons of the University Athletic Association of the Philippines (UAAP).

== Early life ==
Magbuhos was born in Rome, Italy to a second generation of Filipino migrants. His father Wilfrey Sr. came from Cavite while his mother Charito (née Gunda) came from Laguna. He grew up in Italy and stayed there until his senior year of high school.

Growing up, Vince and his brother Wilfrey Jr. played different sports including football and volleyball. Their father encouraged them to play basketball, as it could lead to scholarships in the Philippines.

== College career ==
In 2015, Vince and his brother Wilfrey Jr. went to the Philippines to tryout for collegiate basketball. Fortunately, they were scouted by the University of the East. The trio played for UE in the pre-season but didn't make UE's final lineup.

=== Adamson Soaring Falcons (2018–2023) ===
In 2017, the Magbuhos brothers committed to Adamson University. They were able to play for them beginning in Season 81 of the University Athletic Association of the Philippines (UAAP). In his debut, Vince contributed a double-double of 10 points and 10 rebounds in an upset win over the Ateneo Blue Eagles. He then scored a season-high 15 points on 7-of-9 shooting along with four steals in a win over the UST Growling Tigers. He played for them again in Season 82, but had a lesser impact as his minutes were cut in half from 14 minutes to just seven, and was only able to average two points a game.

During a loss to the FEU Tamaraws in Season 84, Magbuhos contributed eight points and nine rebounds. He then had 11 points and eight rebounds in a win over UST. In Adamson's final game of the season against the UE Red Warriors, he put up 11 points, 10 rebounds, three assists, and two steals. However, Adamson barely missed out on the playoffs. For that season, he finished as one of the team's best two-way players, with averages of 1.9 steals (third in the league) and 0.5 blocks while also shooting above 30% from three. However, he only averaged four points per game.

For Season 85, Adamson started the season with two straight losses. They got their first win of the season against UE. Magbuhos then had a career-high 23 points on seven three-pointers in a win over FEU. He also contributed five rebounds, two steals, and two blocks as they evened out their record to 2–2. In their game against the UP Fighting Maroons, he injured his right knee. He missed several games before making his return against the DLSU Green Archers. For that season, he averaged 6.7 points. After the basketball tournament ended, he competed in several 3x3 events, including the NBA Philippines 3x3 competition (which his team won), and the UAAP 3x3 tournament (in which they made it to the finals).

On his 24th birthday, during Season 86, Magbuhos scored 11 points and drained a game-winning three-pointer in overtime against Ateneo. This was Adamson's first win over Ateneo since Season 81. However, Ateneo got their revenge when they eliminated Adamson for the last Final Four spot. This was both Vince and Wilfrey's last season with the team.

== PBA career statistics ==
Legend
GP	Games played	MPG	Minutes per game	FG%	Field-goal percentage
3FG%	3-point field-goal percentage	4P%	4-point field-goal percentage	FT%	Free-throw percentage
RPG	Rebounds per game	APG	Assists per game	SPG	Steals per game
BPG	Blocks per game	PPG	Points per game	127	Career high

As of the end of 2025–26 season

=== Season-by-season averages ===
Year	Team	GP	MPG	FG%	3P%	4P%	FT%	RPG	APG	SPG	BPG	PPG
2025–26	Meralco	10	6.4	.313	.125	—	.750	.9	.4	.3	—	1.4

== Personal life ==
Magbuhos holds dual citizenship with Italy and the Philippines.
