= Japeth Aguilar =

Filipino basketball player (born 1987)

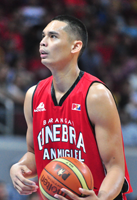
- Aguilar with the Barangay Ginebra San Miguel in 2014

No. 25 – Barangay Ginebra San Miguel
- Position: Center
- League: PBA

Personal information
- Born: January 25, 1987 (age 39) Sexmoan, Pampanga, Philippines (now Sasmuan, Pampanga)
- Listed height: 6 ft 9 in (2.06 m)
- Listed weight: 235 lb (107 kg)

Career information
- High school: Mapúa (Manila, Philippines)
- College: Ateneo (2003–2005); Western Kentucky (2007–2009)
- PBA draft: 2009: 1st round1st overall
- Drafted by: Burger King Whoopers
- Playing career: 2009–present

Career history
- 2009: Burger King Whoppers
- 2011–2013: Talk 'N Text Tropang Texters
- 2013: GlobalPort Batang Pier
- 2013–present: Barangay Ginebra San Miguel

Career highlights
- 9× PBA champion (2012 Philippine, 2016 Governors', 2017 Governors', 2018 Commissioner's, 2019 Governors', 2020 Philippine, 2021 Governors', 2022–23 Commissioner's, 2026 Commissioner's); PBA Finals MVP (2019 Governors'); 10× PBA All-Star (2013–2019, 2023, 2024, 2026); 3× PBA All-Star Game MVP (2019, 2024, 2026); 3× PBA Mythical First Team (2017, 2018, 2020); 3× PBA Mythical Second Team (2016, 2019, 2025); 3× PBA All-Defensive Team (2016, 2017, 2019)

Japeth Paul Cabrera Aguilar (born January 25, 1987) is a Filipino professional basketball player for the Barangay Ginebra San Miguel of the Philippine Basketball Association (PBA). He first played college basketball for the Ateneo Blue Eagles of the University Athletic Association of the Philippines (UAAP), but after two seasons, he moved to the Western Kentucky University Hilltoppers in the Division I of the National Collegiate Athletic Association in the United States.

== College career ==
=== UAAP ===
Aguilar suited up as a college freshman for the Ateneo de Manila University Blue Eagles in the University Athletic Association of the Philippines in 2004. However, his first season stint was cut short due to appendicitis, but still managed to score 13 points, grab 11 rebounds and block 10 shots in 55 minutes of action in 10 games.

On his sophomore year, he bounced back from a disappointing first season as he averaged 5.7 points, 9.3 rebounds and 3.2 blocked shots per contest to help lead the Blue Eagles to a 10–4 finish in 2005. He scored in double digits on three occasions, while he just missed a double-double twice after posting nine points and a career-best 10 boards in Ateneo's season opener as well as 10 points and eight rebounds later in the year in a win over Far Eastern University. Aguilar shot a high 55.4 percent from the field for the season, and he was credited with multiple blocks in 12 of the Blue Eagles’ 16 games — that included a career high of seven as well as two other contests with five or more. He led the UAAP in rejections during his sophomore season, with a total of 48 blocks in 16 games.

=== NCAA Division I ===
Aguilar later transferred to Western Kentucky University, where he saw action with the Hilltoppers mostly as a reserve. He entered the NCAA as a junior in 2007. This made him the first Philippine-born player to play in the NCAA Division I. He recorded four points, three rebounds, two assists and two steals in his collegiate début against Kennesaw State on November 9, 2007. He then collected two points, five rebounds and a game-best three blocks on November 13 against Kentucky Wesleyan. He was injured in practice after the victory over Kentucky Wesleyan and missed the rest of the year.

In his senior season, Aguilar only played 14 games and averaged five minutes per game.

== Return to the Philippines ==
=== PBA and Smart Gilas ===
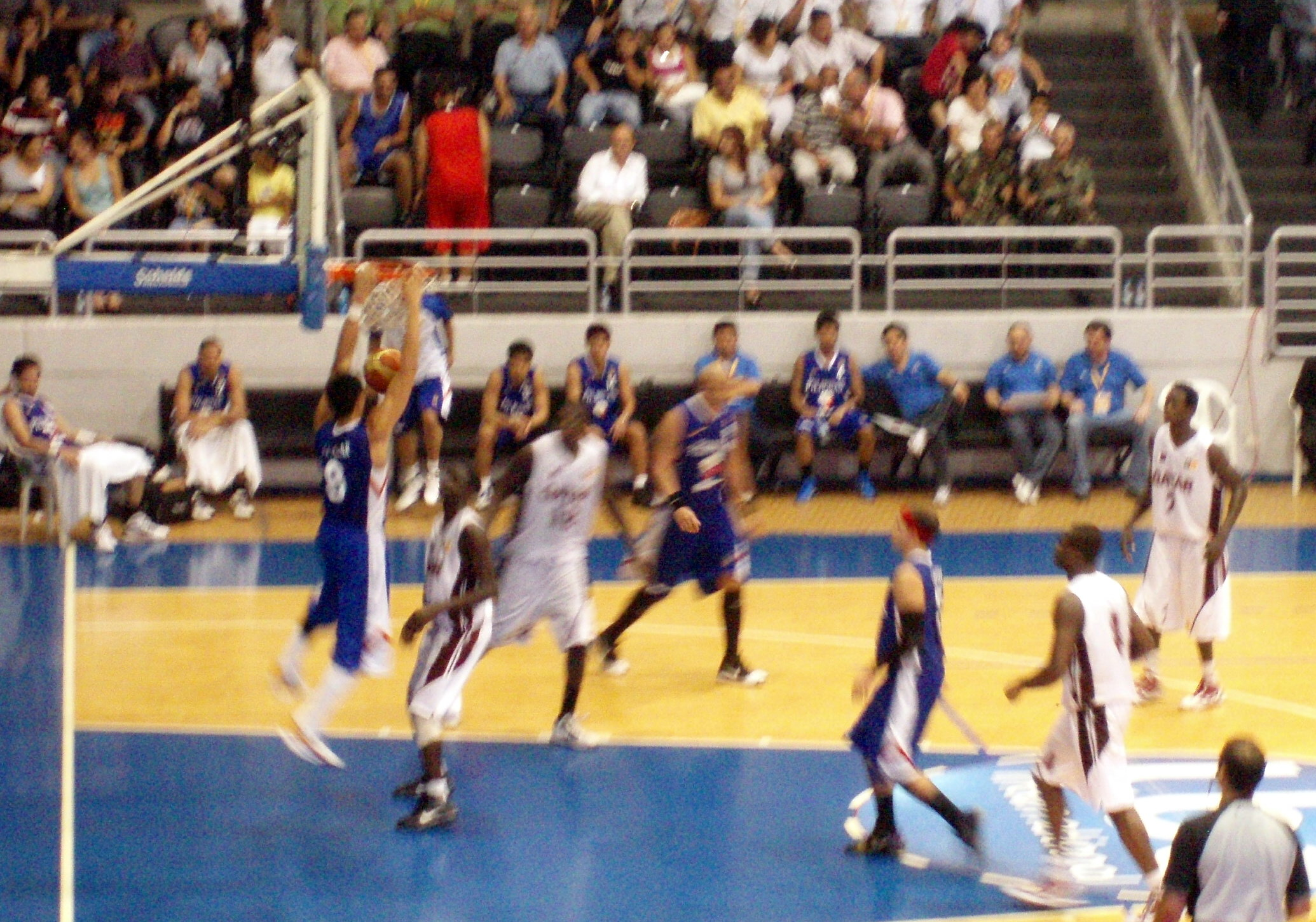
Aguilar with Smart Gilas in 2010

As expected, the Burger King Whoppers nabbed Aguilar as its overall No.1 draft pick in the 2009 PBA draft; however days after the draft, he boldly declared that he would join the Smart Gilas Pilipinas developmental basketball program coached by Serbian Rajko Toroman, a move which caused controversy within the PBA and angst especially by the team that drafted him. PBA governor Lito Alvarez even went to the extent of banning Aguilar from the league for his refusal to sign with the Whoppers.

An amicable settlement was reached on October 9, 2009, two days before the 35th PBA season. With SBP president Manny Pangilinan and executive director Noli Eala intervening and at Alvarez's behest, Aguilar signed the one-year contract with the Whoppers. The deal required him to play a few games with the Burger King Whoppers after which he would be traded to the Talk 'N Text Tropang Texters (Pangilinan's PBA team), which in turn would release him to Smart Gilas. Alvarez also pointed out that the No. 18 uniform was ready even before Aguilar signed the contract.

Aguilar played his only professional game with the Whoppers against the Purefoods Tender Juicy Giants in the PBA season opener, which ended in a 93–80 loss to the Giants. Immediately after, Aguilar got his wish as the Whoppers traded him to the Tropang Texters in exchange for future draft picks, indirectly through Barako Bull Energy Boosters which acted as the conduit team. As expected, TNT loaned him to Smart Gilas where he stayed until after the 2012 London Olympics Asian Qualifier as per his Gilas contract. He then played for TNT during the 2011–12 season.

== Pursuing the NBA dream ==
After his contract with Talk 'N Text expired in 2012, Aguilar decided to pursue opportunities to play in the NBA. He is the first player born and raised in the Philippines to ever receive an invitation to work out with an NBA team.

Days before the evaluation, Aguilar attended some open workouts hosted by the Bakersfield Jam of the NBA Development League. Aguilar's team lost but he had managed to put up some notable statistics. He finished the game with 10 points (shooting five from nine field goal attempts), five blocks, four rebounds and an assist. His performance also included three dunks.

In late September 2012, Aguilar was invited to a two-day workout with the New Orleans Hornets. He also attended workouts with the San Antonio Spurs.

Shortly after, in early October 2012, Aguilar worked out with NBA D-League team, the Santa Cruz Warriors. The Warriors expressed that they would draft him if he was still available when their turn came in the draft.

=== Santa Cruz Warriors ===
On November 2, Japeth Aguilar's pursuit of his NBA dream got closer to reality after he became the first ever Filipino to be drafted in the NBA Development League. The Santa Cruz Warriors, the D-League affiliate of the Golden State Warriors in the NBA, selected Aguilar as the thirteenth pick in the seventh round of the 2012 NBA D-League draft, selected as 109th overall out of 139 players. Aguilar was described as a "work in progress" by the New Orleans Hornets talent scout Don Sellers.

After surviving two cuts, Santa Cruz Warriors waived Aguilar on November 22. After being the last man cut from the Warriors, he was offered a spot on the practice line-up, and signed a practice player contract. However, he changed his mind and decided to consider other options.

== Return to PBA ==
=== GlobalPort Batang Pier (2013) ===
After a failed attempt to play in NBA, he returned to the Philippines and requested a trade from the Talk 'N Text Tropang Texters. He was then traded to GlobalPort Batang Pier for Rabeh Al-Hussaini.

=== Barangay Ginebra San Miguel (2013–present) ===
On June 11, 2013, GlobalPort was part of a 4-team trade and Aguilar was sent to Barangay Ginebra San Miguel.

Aguilar was paired with Greg Slaughter and they were dubbed the "Twin Towers". In his first game for the Kings, Aguilar tallied 18 points, 8 rebounds and 5 blocks against San Mig Super Coffee Mixers. He tallied his first double-double the next game against the Rain or Shine Elasto Painters by logging 19 points and 10 rebounds. In a December 8, 2013, game against his former team Talk 'N Text Tropang Texters, Aguilar knocked down a 3-point shot to give the Kings a 97–95 lead with 1.1 seconds remaining. In the subsequent play, he blocked the game-tying field goal attempt by Ranidel de Ocampo to secure the victory. He finished the game with 21 points, 12 rebounds and 7 blocks in 38 minutes. On December 28, 2013, against the Meralco Bolts, he knocked down the game winning 3 point shot at the buzzer to attain an 83–82 victory. He finished the game with 15 points and 11 rebounds. With his newfound confidence, he now leads the team in scoring, and is one of the leading candidates for Best Player of the Conference trophy in the 2013–14 PBA Philippine Cup, trailing statistical points leader June Mar Fajardo.

On October 14, 2016, he was recognized during the PBA Leo Awards Night as he was named to the PBA All-Defensive Team and PBA Mythical Second Team.

On January 6, 2022, Aguilar signed a three-year contract extension with Barangay Ginebra.

== National team career ==
Aguilar first played for Philippines men's national team in 2009. He played for Powerade Team Pilipinas in the 2009 FIBA Asia Championship but saw limited action.

When the team transitioned into its Gilas era, Aguilar became the team's starting power forward. However, for the 2011 FIBA Asia Championship, PBA pros Kelly Williams and Ranidel De Ocampo were added to the team, putting him in the back of the rotation.

Aguilar was offered the chance to train with the Philippines for the 2012 Jones Cup, but declined as he wanted to explore opportunities in the US. He got another chance to play for Gilas in the 2013 FIBA Asia Championship, where he averaged 5.8 points and 3.9 rebounds on 54% shooting in 25 minutes, and helped Gilas qualify for the 2014 FIBA World Cup.

Aguilar was included in the 21-man pool for the 2023 FIBA World Cup, where he was eventually included in the final 12-man lineup. Aguilar retired from the national team on December 1, 2025, on the day the Philippines played against Guam in the 2027 FIBA Basketball World Cup qualifiers.

== Career statistics ==
=== PBA ===
Legend
GP	Games played	MPG	Minutes per game	FG%	Field-goal percentage
3FG%	3-point field-goal percentage	4P%	4-point field-goal percentage	FT%	Free-throw percentage
RPG	Rebounds per game	APG	Assists per game	SPG	Steals per game
BPG	Blocks per game	PPG	Points per game	**127**	Career high

As of the end of 2024–25 season

==== Season-by-season averages ====
Year	Team	GP	MPG	FG%	3P%	4P%	FT%	RPG	APG	SPG	BPG	PPG
2009–10	Burger King	1	24.0	.333	.000	—	.600	**9.0**	**2.0**	—	1.0	10.0
2011–12	Talk 'N Text	52	15.4	.450	.125	—	.664	4.1	.5	.3	1.3	6.6
2012–13	GlobalPort	18	25.2	.420	.267	—	.667	6.2	1.1	.4	1.8	9.6
2012–13	Barangay Ginebra	18	25.2	.420	.267	—	.667	6.2	1.1	.4	1.8	9.6
2013–14	Barangay Ginebra	43	**30.4**	.508	.200	—	.668	7.6	1.1	.3	**2.1**	13.7
2014–15	Barangay Ginebra	33	25.0	.521	**.400**	—	.724	7.6	.8	.3	1.5	11.6
2015–16	Barangay Ginebra	49	**30.4**	.499	.267	—	.682	7.0	1.4	**.5**	1.7	13.7
2016–17	Barangay Ginebra	62	29.8	.506	.234	—	.686	7.8	1.5	.3	1.9	13.9
2017–18	Barangay Ginebra	52	28.4	.553	.270	—	.691	7.0	1.8	**.5**	1.2	**16.4**
2019	Barangay Ginebra	52	27.9	.562	.375	—	.593	6.8	1.7	**.5**	1.6	14.5
2020	Barangay Ginebra	22	29.8	**.573**	.250	—	.615	8.3	1.3	**.5**	1.4	15.6
2021	Barangay Ginebra	25	27.9	.541	.000	—	.692	5.4	1.0	.4	1.4	13.0
2022–23	Barangay Ginebra	45	23.6	.532	.222	—	.673	5.8	.9	.4	1.5	11.2
2023–24	Barangay Ginebra	34	24.4	.538	.000	—	**.777**	6.0	.7	.2	1.2	11.6
2024–25	Barangay Ginebra	**69**	29.9	.569	.000	.000	.733	6.4	1.3	.4	1.0	15.0
Career		557	26.9	.529	.242	.000	.682	6.6	1.2	.4	1.5	13.0

=== National team ===
Legend
GP	Games played	MPG	Minutes per game
FG%	Field-goal percentage	3P%	3-point field-goal percentage	FT%	Free-throw percentage
RPG	Rebounds per game	APG	Assists per game	SPG	Steals per game
BPG	Blocks per game	PPG	Points per game	**Bold**	Career high

==== FIBA ====
Year	Team	GP	MPG	FG%	3P%	FT%	RPG	APG	SPG	BPG	PPG
2009 FIBA Asia Championship	Philippines	6	13.5	.476	.000	.667	3.5	.5	.2	.2	4.3
2010 FIBA Asia Champions Cup	Philippines	7	11.5	.375	.222	.600	1.9	.6	.1	.3	4.3
2010 FIBA Asia Stanković Cup	Philippines	6	11.8	.481	.000	.500	4.5	.5	—	.8	5.2
2011 FIBA Asia Champions Cup	Philippines	7	22.6	.556	—	.500	5.0	.6	.3	1.1	8.0
2011 SEABA Championship	Philippines	4	21.0	.634	**1.000**	.579	**8.3**	.3	**1.0**	1.0	**16.0**
2011 FIBA Asia Championship	Philippines	5	8.2	.565	—	.700	3.2	—	.4	.2	6.6
2013 FIBA Asia Championship	Philippines	9	14.9	.541	.000	.750	3.9	.2	.1	.9	5.8
2014 FIBA Asia Cup	Philippines	6	13.7	.500	.000	.625	2.8	.5	.5	.5	5.2
2014 FIBA Basketball World Cup	Philippines	4	7.5	.400	—	.500	1.5	—	—	—	2.5
2016 FIBA World Olympic Qualifying Tournament	Philippines	1	2.3	—	—	—	—	—	—	—	—
2017 SEABA Championship	Philippines	6	16.0	**.694**	.500	.556	4.7	.7	.2	**1.8**	9.3
2017 FIBA Asia Cup	Philippines	6	23.6	.389	.500	.583	6.3	1.2	—	**1.8**	6.0
2019 FIBA Basketball World Cup qualification	Philippines	**11**	16.7	.524	.200	.706	3.4	.5	.4	.8	5.2
2019 FIBA Basketball World Cup	Philippines	5	20.9	.367	.250	.500	3.0	1.0	—	.2	4.8
2023 FIBA Basketball World Cup qualification	Philippines	4	**24.8**	.393	.000	**1.000**	2.8	**1.5**	.5	.5	7.5
2023 FIBA Basketball World Cup	Philippines	5	4.7	.250	—	—	.6	—	—	—	.4
2024 FIBA Men's Olympic Qualifying Tournaments	Philippines	3	12.7	.375	—	**1.000**	3.3	1.0	.3	1.0	2.7
2025 FIBA Asia Cup qualification	Philippines	5	7.9	.556	—	.000	2.6	.6	.6	.2	4.0
2025 FIBA Asia Cup	Philippines	4	3.5	.400	—	—	.8	.3	—	.3	1.0
Career		104	14.5	.503	.171	.633	3.5	.5	.2	.7	5.5

==== Asian Games ====
Year	Team	GP	MPG	FG%	3P%	FT%	RPG	APG	SPG	BPG	PPG
2014	Philippines	7	9.7	**.545**	—	**.600**	2.9	—	.4	.1	**4.3**
2022	Philippines	7	**12.9**	.414	.000	.500	**3.3**	.6	**.6**	**.7**	4.0
Career		14	11.3	.471	.000	.556	3.1	.3	.5	.4	4.1

==== Southeast Asian Games ====
Year	Team	GP	MPG	FG%	3P%	FT%	RPG	APG	SPG	BPG	PPG
2019	Philippines	5	13.3	.625	.000	.500	5.4	.6	.2	.6	7.0
Career		5	13.3	.625	.000	.500	5.4	.6	.2	.6	7.0

=== NCAA ===
Year	Team	GP	GS	MPG	FG%	3P%	FT%	RPG	APG	SPG	BPG	PPG
2007–08	Western Kentucky	3	—	**13.3**	.400	.000	**.800**	**3.3**	1.0	**1.0**	**1.3**	**2.7**
2008–09	Western Kentucky	**14**	1	5.1	**.563**	—	.600	.9	—	.1	.4	1.5
Career		17	1	6.5	.524	.000	.700	1.9	.4	.5	.8	2.1

== Esports ==
In 2018, Japeth Aguilar became a Mobile Legends: Bang Bang ambassador for the LIGA event relating the esport game to basketball. Aguilar said that MLBB shares common characteristics with basketball where players form a bond and work together as a team.

== Personal life ==
Aguilar's father, Peter, was also a basketball player in the PBA. In 2018, he threw a chair at Nathan Sobey, who was also punched by bystander Jio Jalalon, in the Philippines–Australia basketball brawl in 2018.

In October 2019, Aguilar married his longtime girlfriend and former beauty queen Cassandra Naidas.
