= Geo Chiu =

Filipino basketball player (born 2001)

No. 18 – Terrafirma Dyip
- Position: Center
- League: PBA

Personal information
- Born: May 18, 2001 (age 25)
- Listed height: 6 ft 10 in (2.08 m)

Career information
- High school: Pace Academy (Quezon City); Ateneo (Quezon City)
- College: Ateneo (2019-2023)
- PBA draft: 2025: 1st round, 1st overall pick
- Drafted by: Terrafirma Dyip
- Playing career: 2024–present

Career history
- 2024–2025: Ehime Orange Vikings
- 2025: Abra Solid North Weavers
- 2026–present: Terrafirma Dyip

Career highlights
- MPBL champion (2025); AsiaBasket champion (2023 Las Piñas); 2× UAAP champion (2019, 2022)

Shaun Geoffrey Chiu (born May 18, 2001) is a Filipino professional basketball player for the Terrafirma Dyip of the Philippine Basketball Association (PBA).

Chiu was a three-time UAAP champion with one juniors' title and two seniors' titles, all while playing for the Ateneo Blue Eagles.

In 2024, he joined the Ehime Orange Vikings in the second division of Japan's B.League. The following year, he returned to the Philippines, this time with the Abra Solid North Weavers of the Maharlika Pilipinas Basketball League. In September 2025, Chiu was drafted first overall by the Terrafirma Dyip during the PBA season 50 draft.

He also suited up for the Philippines national team in international competitions.

== High school and college career ==
Geo Chiu started high school at Pace Academy, where he is part of its high school basketball team in the Filipino-Chinese Amateur Athletic Federation. On April 1, 2017, he committed to playing for Ateneo de Manila University's Blue Eaglets, reinforcing a tall frontcourt alongside Kai Sotto.

On April 22, 2019, he announced that he will remain in Ateneo for college to play for the senior Blue Eagles. At the senior level, he won two more titles in seasons 82 (2019) and 85 (2022). In 2023, Chiu earned his college degree in International Studies. On May 22, 2024, Chiu began playing in the professional The Asian Tournament, forgoing his final year with Ateneo.

== Professional career ==
=== Ehime Orange Vikings (2024–2025) ===
On June 30, 2024, Chiu signed with the Ehime Orange Vikings, a team in the second division of Japan's B.League, for his first major professional stint. He averaged 3.1 points and 3.2 rebounds during his stint in Japan.

=== Abra Solid North Weavers (2025) ===
On June 21, 2025, Chiu returned to Philippine basketball, signing with the Abra Solid North Weavers of the regional Maharlika Pilipinas Basketball League.

On August 29, he declared for the PBA season 50 draft as one of the final applicants. He would later be selected first overall by the Terrafirma Dyip. He is set to make his PBA debut sometime after his stint in the 2025 MPBL season.

=== Terrafirma Dyip (2026–present) ===
On February 8, 2026, it was announced that Chiu has signed a 3-year rookie contract with the Terrafirma Dyip.

== PBA career statistics ==
Legend
GP	Games played	MPG	Minutes per game	FG%	Field-goal percentage
3FG%	3-point field-goal percentage	4P%	4-point field-goal percentage	FT%	Free-throw percentage
RPG	Rebounds per game	APG	Assists per game	SPG	Steals per game
BPG	Blocks per game	PPG	Points per game	127	Career high

As of the end of 2025–26 season

=== Season-by-season averages ===
Year	Team	GP	MPG	FG%	3P%	4P%	FT%	RPG	APG	SPG	BPG	PPG
2025–26	Terrafirma	24	27.9	.566	.000	—	.573	10.4	.6	.3	1.6	8.5

== National team career ==
Chiu has represented the Philippines in international competitions, with his first tournament being the 2017 FIBA U16 Asian Championship.
