= 2018 PBA Commissioner's Cup =

- Duration: April 22 – August 8, 2018
- TV partner(s): Local: ESPN 5 The 5 Network; PBA Rush (HD); International: AksyonTV International

Finals
- Champions: Barangay Ginebra San Miguel
- Runners-up: San Miguel Beermen

Awards
- Best Player: June Mar Fajardo (San Miguel Beermen)
- Best Import: Justin Brownlee (Barangay Ginebra San Miguel)
- Finals MVP: Scottie Thompson (Barangay Ginebra San Miguel)

PBA Commissioner's Cup chronology
- < 2017 2019 >

PBA conference chronology
- < 2017–18 Philippine 2018 Governors' >

The 2018 Philippine Basketball Association (PBA) Commissioner's Cup, also known as the 2018 Honda–PBA Commissioner's Cup for sponsorship reasons, was the second conference of the 2017–18 PBA season. The tournament allows teams to hire foreign players or imports with a height limit of 6'10". The conference started on April 22 and ended on August 8, 2018.

== Format ==
The following format will be observed for the duration of the conference:

- Single-round robin eliminations; 11 games per team; Teams are then seeded by basis on win–loss records.
- Top eight teams will advance to the quarterfinals. In case of tie, a playoff game will be held only for the #8 seed.
- Quarterfinals:
  - QF1: #1 vs #8 (#1 twice-to-beat)
  - QF2: #2 vs #7 (#2 twice-to-beat)
  - QF3: #3 vs #6 (best-of-3 series)
  - QF4: #4 vs #5 (best-of-3 series)
- Semifinals (best-of-5 series):
  - SF1: QF1 Winner vs. QF4 Winner
  - SF2: QF2 Winner vs. QF3 Winner
- Finals (best-of-7 series)
  - F1: SF1 Winner vs SF2 Winner

== Elimination round ==
=== Team standings ===
Pos	Team	W	L	PCT	GB	Qualification
1	Rain or Shine Elasto Painters	9	2	.818	—	Twice-to-beat in the quarterfinals
2	Alaska Aces	8	3	.727 (Note: Head-to-head record: Alaska 1–0 TNT)	1	Twice-to-beat in the quarterfinals
3	TNT KaTropa	8	3	.727	1	Best-of-three quarterfinals
4	Meralco Bolts	7	4	.636	2	Best-of-three quarterfinals
5	Barangay Ginebra San Miguel	6	5	.545 (Note: Head-to-head quotient: Barangay Ginebra 1.07, San Miguel 1.02, Magnolia 0.92)	3	Best-of-three quarterfinals
6	San Miguel Beermen	6	5	.545	3	Best-of-three quarterfinals
7	Magnolia Hotshots Pambansang Manok	6	5	.545	3	Twice-to-win in the quarterfinals
8	GlobalPort Batang Pier	5	6	.455	4	Twice-to-win in the quarterfinals
9	Columbian Dyip	4	7	.364 (Note: Head-to-head record: Columbian 1–0 Phoenix)	5	
10	Phoenix Fuel Masters	4	7	.364	5	
11	NLEX Road Warriors	2	9	.182	7	
12	Blackwater Elite	1	10	.091	8	

Source: PBA.ph
Rules for classification: 1) winning percentage; 2) if two teams are tied, head to head record; if three or more teams are tied, head-to-head goal average (quotient); 3) overall quotient 4) coin toss

=== Schedule ===
Team ╲ Game	1	2	3	4	5	6	7	8	9	10	11
Alaska Aces	ROS	BWE	COL	TNT	SMB	GP	MAG	NLEX	MER	BGSM	PHX
Barangay Ginebra San Miguel	ROS	TNT	BWE	PHX	MER	SMB	NLEX	MAG	COL	ALA	GP
Blackwater Elite	COL	PHX	ALA	GP	BGSM	TNT	NLEX	MAG	ROS	MER	SMB
Columbian Dyip	BWE	MER	NLEX	ALA	ROS	MAG	TNT	SMB	PHX	BGSM	GP
GlobalPort Batang Pier	TNT	MER	BWE	MAG	NLEX	ROS	ALA	SMB	PHX	COL	BGSM
Magnolia Hotshots Pambansang Manok	PHX	GP	COL	MER	ROS	BWE	ALA	TNT	BGSM	NLEX	SMB
Meralco Bolts	COL	GP	NLEX	SMB	MAG	BGSM	PHX	BWE	ALA	TNT	ROS
NLEX Road Warriors	COL	ROS	MER	PHX	GP	BWE	TNT	BGSM	ALA	SMB	MAG
Phoenix Fuel Masters	BWE	TNT	MAG	NLEX	BGSM	SMB	MER	COL	ROS	GP	ALA
Rain or Shine Elasto Painters	ALA	BGSM	NLEX	COL	SMB	GP	MAG	BWE	PHX	MER	TNT
San Miguel Beermen	MER	ROS	ALA	PHX	BGSM	COL	GP	TNT	NLEX	BWE	MAG
TNT KaTropa	GP	PHX	BGSM	ALA	BWE	COL	NLEX	MAG	SMB	MER	ROS

= Win; = OT win; = Loss; = OT loss

=== Results ===
Team	ALA	BGSM	BWE	COL	GP	MAG	MER	NLEX	PHX	ROS	SMB	TNT
Alaska		86–105	93–74	134–103	109–103	103–99	74–89	120–111	114–91	103–109*	105–103	110–100
Barangay Ginebra	—		105–91	134–107	116–98	104–84	82–93	93–85	98–103**	89–108	97–104*	92–96
Blackwater	—	—		98–126	106–117	86–84	75–102	89–93	102–107	94–104	106–115	101–120
Columbian	—	—	—		115–133	101–126	103–116	123–103	115–107	104–96	117–129	95–123
GlobalPort	—	—	—	—		87–92	86–85	116–94	108–135	90–96	98–94	114–128
Magnolia	—	—	—	—	—		81–79	116–89	87–89	96–99*	101–97	111–89
Meralco	—	—	—	—	—	—		106–90	103–100*	99–106*	93–85	85–91
NLEX	—	—	—	—	—	—	—		120–115*	97–98	114–125	106–117
Phoenix	—	—	—	—	—	—	—	—		106–108	94–106	98–106
Rain or Shine	—	—	—	—	—	—	—	—	—		123–119*	85–100
San Miguel	—	—	—	—	—	—	—	—	—	—		99–94
TNT	—	—	—	—	—	—	—	—	—	—	—	

Legend: Blue = left column team win; Red = top row team win.
Matches with lighter background shading were decided after overtime.

== Bracket ==
Quarterfinals
(#1 twice-to-beat)
1	Rain or Shine	113	103
8	GlobalPort	114	97
(Best-of-3)
4	Meralco	0
5	Barangay Ginebra	2
(#2 twice-to-beat)
2	Alaska	89
7	Magnolia	78
(Best-of-3)
3	TNT	0
6	San Miguel	2

Semifinals (Best-of-5)
1	Rain or Shine	1
5	Barangay Ginebra	3
2	Alaska	1
6	San Miguel	3

finals (Best-of-7)
5	Barangay Ginebra	4
6	San Miguel	2

== Quarterfinals ==
=== (1) Rain or Shine vs. (8) GlobalPort ===
ESPN 5

July 10
4:30 pm

Box score

Rain or Shine Elasto Painters 113, GlobalPort Batang Pier 114
Scoring by quarter: 26–24, 34–28, 31–31, 22–31
Pts: Johnson 24; Rebs: Johnson 15; Asts: Ahanmisi 8	Pts: White 28; Rebs: White 16; Asts: Pringle 9

Smart Araneta Coliseum, Quezon City
Referees: J. Mariano, R. Yante, R. Gruta, M. Flordeliza

ESPN 5

July 12
7:00 pm

Box score

Rain or Shine Elasto Painters 103, GlobalPort Batang Pier 97
Scoring by quarter: 24–22, 22–16, 29–29, 28–30
Pts: Johnson 29; Rebs: Johnson, Norwood 15; Asts: Johnson 6	Pts: Pringle 23; Rebs: White 10; Asts: Pringle 8
Rain or Shine wins series in two games

Mall of Asia Arena, Pasay
Referees: N. Quilinguen, P. Balao, J. Mariano, J. Narandan

=== (2) Alaska vs. (7) Magnolia ===
ESPN 5

July 10
7:00 pm

Box score

Alaska Aces 89, Magnolia Hotshots Pambansang Manok 78
Scoring by quarter: 26–21, 20–22, 32–19, 11–16
Pts: Manuel 22; Rebs: Simpson 15; Asts: Enciso, Simpson 4	Pts: Chism 20; Rebs: Chism 15; Asts: Barroca 5
Alaska wins series in one game

Smart Araneta Coliseum, Quezon City
Referees: S. Perez, N. Guevarra, M. Montoya, J. Narandan

=== (3) TNT vs. (6) San Miguel ===
ESPN 5

July 9
4:30 pm

Box score

TNT KaTropa 110, San Miguel Beermen 121
Scoring by quarter: 40–21, 22–27, 26–38, 22–35
Pts: Pogoy, Smith 17; Rebs: Castro, Smith 8 Asts: Castro 9	Pts: Balkman 36; Rebs: Balkman 16; Asts: Cabagnot, Ross 6

Smart Araneta Coliseum, Quezon City
Referees: J. Mariano, S. Pineda, E. Tangkion, J. Narandan

ESPN 5

July 11
7:00 pm

Box score

TNT KaTropa 102, San Miguel Beermen 106
Scoring by quarter: 32–27, 24–28, 21–25, 25–26
Pts: Romeo 28; Rebs: Smith 18; Asts: Castro 9	Pts: Balkman 25; Rebs: Fajardo 12; Asts: Ross 10
San Miguel wins series, 2–0

Smart Araneta Coliseum, Quezon City
Referees: N. Quilinguen, N. Guevarra, M. Montoya, M. Flordeliza

=== (4) Meralco vs. (5) Barangay Ginebra ===
ESPN 5

July 9
7:00 pm

Box score

Meralco Bolts 81, Barangay Ginebra San Miguel 88
Scoring by quarter: 20–22, 25–16, 17–29, 19–21
Pts: Amer 15; Rebs: Onuaku 18; Asts: Newsome 7	Pts: Brownlee 25; Rebs: J. Aguilar 10; Asts: Brownlee 6

Smart Araneta Coliseum, Quezon City
Referees: N. Quilinguen, N. Guevarra, M. Montoya, M. Flordeliza

ESPN 5

July 11
4:30 pm

Box score

Meralco Bolts 90, Barangay Ginebra San Miguel 104
Scoring by quarter: 28–24, 23–32, 14–23, 25–25
Pts: Onuaku 21; Rebs: Onuaku 13; Asts: Amer, Newsome 4	Pts: Brownlee 36; Rebs: Slaughter 10; Asts: Brownlee 9
Barangay Ginebra wins series, 2–0

Smart Araneta Coliseum, Quezon City
Referees: P. Balao, E. Tangkion, R. Yante, J. Nicandro

== Semifinals ==
=== (1) Rain or Shine vs. (5) Barangay Ginebra ===
ESPN 5

July 15
7:00 pm

Box score

Rain or Shine Elasto Painters 89, Barangay Ginebra San Miguel 102
Scoring by quarter: 17–31, 28–21, 25–24, 19–26
Pts: Johnson 30; Rebs: Johnson 13; Asts: Belga, Tiu 4	Pts: Brownlee 35; Rebs: Brownlee 14; Asts: Brownlee 9

Smart Araneta Coliseum, Quezon City
Referees: N. Quilinguen, S. Pineda, E. Tangkion, J. Nicandro

ESPN 5

July 19
7:00 pm

Box score

Rain or Shine Elasto Painters 109, Barangay Ginebra San Miguel 100
Scoring by quarter: 26–36, 31–21, 30–30, 22–13
Pts: Johnson 25; Rebs: Johnson 20; Asts: Johnson 8	Pts: Brownlee 29; Rebs: Brownlee 12; Asts: three players 4 each

Smart Araneta Coliseum, Quezon City
Referees: P. Balao, J. Mariano, M. Montoya, J. Narandan

ESPN 5

July 21
6:30 pm

Box score

Rain or Shine Elasto Painters 72, Barangay Ginebra San Miguel 75
Scoring by quarter: 10–24, 13–22, 18–15, 31–14
Pts: Johnson 13; Rebs: Johnson 22; Asts: Belga, Johnson 4	Pts: Brownlee 44; Rebs: Brownlee 15; Asts: Thompson 8

Mall of Asia Arena, Pasay
Referees: N. Quilingen, R. Gruta, R. Yante, M. Flordeliza

ESPN 5

July 23
7:00 pm

Box score

Rain or Shine Elasto Painters 94, Barangay Ginebra San Miguel 96
Scoring by quarter: 20–25, 20–22, 27–26, 27–23
Pts: Johnson 22; Rebs: Johnson 16; Asts: Norwood 6	Pts: Devance, Slaughter 19; Rebs: Brownlee 17; Asts: Brownlee 8
Barangay Ginebra wins series, 3–1

Smart Araneta Coliseum, Quezon City
Referees: J. Mariano, E. Tangkion, M. Montoya, J. Nicandro

Note: Game 2 of the Rain or Shine – Barangay Ginebra semifinals series was originally scheduled on July 17, 2018, but was postponed due to inclement weather brought by Tropical Storm Son-Tinh (Henry).

=== (2) Alaska vs. (6) San Miguel ===
ESPN 5

July 14
6:40 pm

Box score

Alaska Aces 79, San Miguel Beermen 92
Scoring by quarter: 24–25, 17–27, 24–23, 14–17
Pts: Simpson 31; Rebs: Simpson 24; Asts: Casio 5	Pts: Fajardo 17; Rebs: Balkman 11; Asts: Cabagnot 5

Mall of Asia Arena, Pasay
Referees: N. Quilinguen, S. Pineda, R. Yante, P. Balao

ESPN 5

July 16
7:00 pm

Box score

Alaska Aces 94, San Miguel Beermen 105
Scoring by quarter: 29–18, 23–23, 22–38, 20–26
Pts: Enciso, Simpson 19; Rebs: Simpson 15; Asts: Enciso 6	Pts: Balkman 31; Rebs: Fajardo 18; Asts: Cabagnot 8

Smart Araneta Coliseum, Quezon City
Referees: J. Mariano, N. Guevarra, R. Gruta, J. Narandan

ESPN 5

July 20
7:00 pm

Box score

Alaska Aces 125, San Miguel Beermen 104
Scoring by quarter: 27–25, 37–30, 30–22, 31–27
Pts: Manuel 24; Rebs: Simpson 13; Asts: Enciso 8	Pts: Balkman 28; Rebs: Fajardo 15; Asts: Cabagnot 7

Ynares Center, Antipolo
Referees: N. Quilinguen, P. Balao, M. Montoya, J. Nicandro

ESPN 5

July 22
6:30 pm

Box score

Alaska Aces 99, San Miguel Beermen 104
Scoring by quarter: 23–20, 21–23, 25–33, 30–28
Pts: Simpson 24; Rebs: Simpson 21; Asts: Enciso 7	Pts: Fajardo 26; Rebs: Balkman 16; Asts: Cabagnot 9
San Miguel wins series, 3–1

Smart Araneta Coliseum, Quezon City
Referees: P. Balao, N. Guevarra, S. Pineda, R. Yante

Note: Game 3 of the Alaska – San Miguel semifinals series was originally scheduled on July 18, 2018, but was postponed due to inclement weather brought by Tropical Storm Son-Tinh (Henry).

== Finals ==
ESPN 5

July 27
7:00 pm

Box score

Barangay Ginebra San Miguel 127, San Miguel Beermen 99

Smart Araneta Coliseum, Quezon City

ESPN 5

July 29
6:30 pm

Box score

Barangay Ginebra San Miguel 109, San Miguel Beermen 134

Smart Araneta Coliseum, Quezon City

ESPN 5

August 1
7:00 pm

Box score

Barangay Ginebra San Miguel 94, San Miguel Beermen 132

Smart Araneta Coliseum, Quezon City

ESPN 5

August 3
7:00 pm

Box score

Barangay Ginebra San Miguel 130, San Miguel Beermen 100

Smart Araneta Coliseum, Quezon City

ESPN 5

August 5
6:30 pm

Box score

Barangay Ginebra San Miguel 87, San Miguel Beermen 83

Smart Araneta Coliseum, Quezon City

ESPN 5

August 8
7:00 pm

Box score

Barangay Ginebra San Miguel 93, San Miguel Beermen 77
Barangay Ginebra wins series, 4–2

Mall of Asia Arena, Pasay

== Imports ==
The following is the list of imports, which had played for their respective teams at least once, with the returning imports in italics. Highlighted are the imports who stayed with their respective teams for the whole conference.

Team	Name	Debuted	Last game	Record
Alaska Aces	(United States) Antonio Campbell	April 27 (vs. Rain or Shine)	June 24 (vs. Barangay Ginebra)	7–3
Alaska Aces	(United States) Diamon Simpson	July 6 (vs. Phoenix)	July 22 (vs. San Miguel)	3–3
Barangay Ginebra San Miguel	(United States) Charles García	April 29 (vs. Rain or Shine)	May 20 (vs. Phoenix)	1–3
Barangay Ginebra San Miguel	(United States) Justin Brownlee	June 1 (vs. Meralco)	August 8 (vs. San Miguel)	14–5
Blackwater Elite	(United States) Jarrid Famous	April 22 (vs. Columbian)	May 18 (vs. TNT)	0–6
Blackwater Elite	(United States) Henry Walker	May 30 (vs. NLEX)	July 4 (vs. San Miguel)	1–4
Columbian Dyip	(United States) C. J. Aiken	April 22 (vs. Blackwater)	April 28 (vs. NLEX)	2–1
Columbian Dyip	(United States) John Fields	May 4 (vs. Alaska)	June 22 (vs. GlobalPort)	2–6
GlobalPort Batang Pier	(United States) Malcolm White	April 22 (vs. TNT)	July 12 (vs. Rain or Shine)	6–7
Magnolia Hotshots Pambansang Manok	(United States) Vernon Macklin	May 6 (vs. Phoenix)	May 18 (vs. Meralco)	3–1
Magnolia Hotshots Pambansang Manok	(United States) Curtis Kelly	June 2 (vs. Rain or Shine)	June 6 (vs. Blackwater)	0–2
Magnolia Hotshots Pambansang Manok	(United States) Justin Jackson	June 10 (vs. Alaska)	June 17 (vs. Barangay Ginebra)	1–2
Magnolia Hotshots Pambansang Manok	(United States) Wayne Chism	July 4 (vs. NLEX)	July 10 (vs. Alaska)	2–1
Meralco Bolts	(United States) Arinze Onuaku	April 25 (vs. Columbian)	July 11 (vs. Barangay Ginebra)	7–6
NLEX Road Warriors	(Jamaica) Adrian Forbes	April 28 (vs. Columbian)	April 28 (vs. Columbian)	0–1
NLEX Road Warriors	(United States) Arnett Moultrie	May 2 (vs. Rain or Shine)	June 23 (vs. San Miguel)	2–7
NLEX Road Warriors	(Nigeria) Olu Ashaolu	July 4 (vs. Magnolia)	July 4 (vs. Magnolia)	0–1
Phoenix Fuel Masters	(United States) James White	April 25 (vs. Blackwater)	May 11 (vs. NLEX)	2–2
Phoenix Fuel Masters	(United States) Eugene Phelps	May 20 (vs. Barangay Ginebra)	July 6 (vs. Alaska)	2–5
Rain or Shine Elasto Painters	(United States) Reggie Johnson	April 27 (vs. Alaska)	July 23 (vs. Barangay Ginebra)	11–6
San Miguel Beermen	(United States) Troy Gillenwater	May 9 (vs. Meralco)	May 13 (vs. Rain or Shine)	0–2
San Miguel Beermen	(Puerto Rico) Renaldo Balkman	May 19 (vs. Alaska)	August 8 (vs. Barangay Ginebra)	13–8
TNT KaTropa	(United States) Jeremy Tyler	April 22 (vs. GlobalPort)	May 13 (vs. Alaska)	3–1
TNT KaTropa	No import	May 18 (vs. Blackwater)		1–0
TNT KaTropa	(United States) Joshua Smith	June 1 (vs. Columbian)	July 11 (vs. San Miguel)	4–4

== Awards ==
=== Conference ===
The Best Player and Best Import of the Conference awards were handed out prior to Game 4 of the Finals, at the Smart Araneta Coliseum:

- Best Player of the Conference: June Mar Fajardo (San Miguel Beermen)
- Best Import of the Conference: Justin Brownlee (Barangay Ginebra San Miguel)
- Finals MVP: Scottie Thompson (Barangay Ginebra San Miguel)

=== Players of the Week ===
Week	Player	Ref.
April 22–29	Chris Tiu (Rain or Shine Elasto Painters)	
April 30 – May 6	Jayson Castro (TNT KaTropa)	
May 7–13	Vic Manuel (Alaska Aces)	
May 14–20	Paul Lee (Magnolia Hotshots Pambansang Manok)	
May 30 – June 3	June Mar Fajardo (San Miguel Beermen)	
June 4–10	Vic Manuel (Alaska Aces)	
June 11–17	Stanley Pringle (GlobalPort Batang Pier)	
June 18–24	LA Tenorio (Barangay Ginebra San Miguel)	
