= 2019 PBA Commissioner's Cup =

- Duration: May 19 – August 16, 2019
- TV partner(s): Local: ESPN5; 5 PBA Rush (HD); International: AksyonTV International

Finals
- Champions: San Miguel Beermen
- Runners-up: TNT KaTropa

Awards
- Best Player: Jayson Castro (TNT KaTropa)
- Best Import: Terrence Jones (TNT KaTropa)
- Finals MVP: Terrence Romeo (San Miguel Beermen)

PBA Commissioner's Cup chronology
- < 2018 2022–23 >

PBA conference chronology
- < 2019 Philippine 2019 Governors' >

The 2019 Philippine Basketball Association (PBA) Commissioner's Cup, also known as the 2019 Honda–PBA Commissioner's Cup for sponsorship reasons, was the second conference of the 2019 PBA season. The tournament allows teams to hire foreign players or imports with a height limit of 6'10".

== Format ==
The following format will be observed for the duration of the conference:

- Single-round robin eliminations; 11 games per team; Teams are then seeded by basis on win–loss records.
- Top eight teams will advance to the quarterfinals. In case of tie, a playoff game will be held only for the #8 seed.
- Quarterfinals:
  - QF1: #1 vs #8 (#1 twice-to-beat)
  - QF2: #2 vs #7 (#2 twice-to-beat)
  - QF3: #3 vs #6 (best-of-3 series)
  - QF4: #4 vs #5 (best-of-3 series)
- Semifinals (best-of-5 series):
  - SF1: QF1 Winner vs. QF4 Winner
  - SF2: QF2 Winner vs. QF3 Winner
- Finals (best-of-7 series)
  - F1: SF1 Winner vs SF2 Winner

== Elimination round ==
=== Team standings ===
Pos	Team	W	L	PCT	GB	Qualification
1	TNT KaTropa	10	1	.909	—	Twice-to-beat in the quarterfinals
2	NorthPort Batang Pier	9	2	.818	1	Twice-to-beat in the quarterfinals
3	Blackwater Elite	7	4	.636 (Note: Head-to-head record: Blackwater 1–0 Barangay Ginebra)	3	Best-of-three quarterfinals
4	Barangay Ginebra San Miguel	7	4	.636	3	Best-of-three quarterfinals
5	Magnolia Hotshots Pambansang Manok	5	6	.455 (Note: Head-to-head quotient: Magnolia 1.19, Rain or Shine 1.01, San Miguel 0.83)	5	Best-of-three quarterfinals
6	Rain or Shine Elasto Painters	5	6	.455	5	Best-of-three quarterfinals
7	San Miguel Beermen	5	6	.455	5	Twice-to-win in the quarterfinals
8	Alaska Aces	4	7	.364 (Note: Head-to-head quotient: Alaska 1.012, Meralco 1.011, Phoenix 0.977; 8th-seed playoff: Alaska 108–103 Meralco)	6	Twice-to-win in the quarterfinals
9	Meralco Bolts	4	7	.364	6	
10	Phoenix Pulse Fuel Masters	4	7	.364	6	
11	Columbian Dyip	3	8	.273 (Note: Head-to-head record: Columbian 1–0 NLEX)	7	
12	NLEX Road Warriors	3	8	.273	7	

Source: PBA.ph
Rules for classification: 1) winning percentage; 2) if two teams are tied, head-to-head record; if three or more teams are tied, head-to-head goal average (quotient), if tied for 8th, one-game playoff; 3) overall quotient 4) coin toss

=== Schedule ===
Team ╲ Game	1	2	3	4	5	6	7	8	9	10	11
Alaska	COL	NP	TNT	NLEX	MAG	MER	PHX	SMB	BGSM	ROS	BWE
Barangay Ginebra	BWE	MER	NP	ROS	TNT	SMB	NLEX	PHX	ALA	MAG	COL
Blackwater	MER	BGSM	COL	PHX	ROS	NLEX	SMB	NP	MAG	TNT	ALA
Columbian	ALA	MER	BWE	NLEX	MAG	TNT	ROS	SMB	NP	PHX	BGSM
Magnolia	ALA	NP	NLEX	COL	PHX	SMB	MER	BWE	BGSM	ROS	TNT
Meralco	BWE	COL	BGSM	ROS	PHX	ALA	TNT	NLEX	MAG	NP	SMB
NLEX	TNT	NP	ALA	COL	BWE	MAG	MER	BGSM	ROS	SMB	PHX
NorthPort	ALA	NLEX	TNT	BGSM	SMB	MAG	ROS	BWE	PHX	COL	MER
Phoenix	BWE	TNT	MER	ROS	ALA	MAG	NP	BGSM	COL	SMB	NLEX
Rain or Shine	MER	BWE	BGSM	PHX	NP	COL	NLEX	TNT	ALA	MAG	SMB
San Miguel	NP	TNT	BWE	BGSM	ALA	MAG	COL	NLEX	PHX	ROS	MER
TNT	NLEX	ALA	NP	PHX	SMB	BGSM	MER	COL	ROS	BWE	MAG

= Win; = OT win; = Loss; = OT loss

=== Results ===
Teams	ALA	BGSM	BWE	COL	MAG	MER	NLEX	NP	PHX	ROS	SMB	TNT
Alaska	—	106–118	104–112	111–98	103–80	93–89	100–87	81–103	76–78	84–86	107–119	85–99
Barangay Ginebra		—	107–108*	127–123*	102–81	110–95	100–85	73–70	103–111	81–104	110–107*	96–104
Blackwater			—	118–110	104–99*	94–91*	132–106	99–127	98–103	98–92	106–127	97–115
Columbian				—	103–110	92–101	120–105	108–110	100–98	86–88*	134–132*	102–109
Magnolia					—	99–88	98–88	99–102	99–96	82–86	118–82	83–98
Meralco						—	91–100	92–93	101–95	91–84	95–91	91–104
NLEX							—	79–83	87–85	100–97	105–109	87–102
NorthPort								—	87–97	107–105*	121–88	110–86
Phoenix Pulse									—	82–89	108–128	88–114
Rain or Shine										—	87–89	81–102
San Miguel											—	97–110
TNT												—

Source: PBA.ph
Legend: Blue = left column team win; Red = top row team win.
Matches with lighter background shading were decided after overtime.

== Eighth seed playoff ==
ESPN5

July 19
7:00 pm

Box score

Alaska Aces 108, Meralco Bolts 103 (OT)
Scoring by quarter: 26–28, 29–15, 13–23, 28–30, Overtime: 12–7
Pts: Manuel 23; Rebs: Simpson 23; Asts: Banchero 9	Pts: James 34; Rebs: Almazan 13; Asts: James 8

Mall of Asia Arena, Pasay
Referees: N. Quilinguen, J. Mariano, R. Gruta, M. Orioste

== Bracket ==
Quarterfinals
(#1 twice-to-beat)
1	TNT	72	104
8	Alaska	108	93
(best-of-3)
4	Barangay Ginebra	2
5	Magnolia	0
(#2 twice-to-beat)
2	NorthPort	84	88
7	San Miguel	98	90
(best-of-3)
3	Blackwater	1
6	Rain or Shine	2

Semifinals (best-of-5)
1	TNT	3
4	Barangay Ginebra	1
7	San Miguel	3
6	Rain or Shine	1

Finals (best-of-7)
1	TNT	2
7	San Miguel	4

== Quarterfinals ==
=== (1) TNT vs. (8) Alaska ===
TNT, with the twice-to-beat advantage, only has to win once, while its opponent, Alaska, has to win twice.

ESPN5

July 21
4:30 pm

Box score

TNT KaTropa 72, Alaska Aces 108
Scoring by quarter: 18–27, 23–26, 19–36, 12–19
Pts: Castro 23; Rebs: Jones, Trollano 6 Asts: Castro 3	Pts: Simpson, Teng 15; Rebs: Simpson 19; Asts: Enciso 5

Smart Araneta Coliseum, Quezon City
Referees: J. Mariano, R. Yante, J. Nicandro, J. Borja

ESPN5

July 24
7:00 pm

Box score

TNT KaTropa 104, Alaska Aces 93
Scoring by quarter: 19–27, 25–27, 35–27, 25–12
Pts: Jones 37; Rebs: Jones 22; Asts: Jones 9	Pts: Enciso 24; Rebs: Simpson 16; Asts: Banchero 9
TNT wins series in two games

Smart Araneta Coliseum, Quezon City
Referees: P. Balao, M. Montoya, M. Flordeliza, M. Orioste

=== (2) NorthPort vs. (7) San Miguel ===
NorthPort, with the twice-to-beat advantage, only has to win once, while its opponent, San Miguel, has to win twice.

ESPN5

July 21
6:45 pm

Box score

NorthPort Batang Pier 84, San Miguel Beermen 98
Scoring by quarter: 18–28, 24–19, 23–26, 19–25
Pts: Bolick 20; Rebs: Ibeh 13; Asts: Bolick 6	Pts: McCullough 24; Rebs: Fajardo 19; Asts: Lassiter, McCullough 4

Smart Araneta Coliseum, Quezon City
Referees: N. Quilinguen, B. Oliva, M. Orioste, J. Tantay

ESPN5

July 24
4:30 pm

Box score

NorthPort Batang Pier 88, San Miguel Beermen 90
Scoring by quarter: 27–21, 12–22, 23–29, 26–18
Pts: Lanete 22; Rebs: Ibeh 20; Asts: Bolick 7	Pts: McCullough 31; Rebs: McCullough 11; Asts: Ross 7
San Miguel wins series in two games

Smart Araneta Coliseum, Quezon City
Referees: S. Pineda, R. Dacanay, J. Narandan, A. Nubla

=== (3) Blackwater vs. (6) Rain or Shine ===
This is a best-of-three playoff.

ESPN5

July 20
4:30 pm

Box score

Blackwater Elite 80, Rain or Shine Elasto Painters 83
Scoring by quarter: 21–22, 18–28, 22–9, 19–24
Pts: Parks 20; Rebs: Smith 19; Asts: Sumang 7	Pts: Daquioag 19; Rebs: Montgomery 19; Asts: three players 3

Mall of Asia Arena, Pasay
Referees: S. Pineda, M. Montoya, A. Nubla, J. Baldago

ESPN5

July 23
7:00 pm

Box score

Blackwater Elite 100, Rain or Shine Elasto Painters 96
Scoring by quarter: 24–15, 14–20, 30–29, 32–32
Pts: Smith 31; Rebs: Smith 18; Asts: Maliksi 4	Pts: Mocon 25; Rebs: Montgomery 15; Asts: Rosales 5

Smart Araneta Coliseum, Quezon City
Referees: J. Mariano, R. Yante, B. Oliva, N. Cortez

ESPN5

July 25
7:00 pm

Box score

Blackwater Elite 83, Rain or Shine Elasto Painters 85
Scoring by quarter: 31–23, 14–15, 24–27, 14–20
Pts: Belo, Parks 16; Rebs: Smith 18; Asts: Sumang 5	Pts: Nambatac 21; Rebs: Montgomery 23; Asts: Mocon 6
Rain or Shine wins series, 2–1

Smart Araneta Coliseum, Quezon City
Referees: N. Quilinguen, R. Gruta, J. Nicandro, A. Nubla

=== (4) Barangay Ginebra vs. (5) Magnolia ===
This is a best-of-three playoff.

ESPN5

July 20
6:45 pm

Box score

Barangay Ginebra San Miguel 85, Magnolia Hotshots Pambansang Manok 79
Scoring by quarter: 26–23, 22–21, 18–16, 19–19
Pts: Brownlee 20; Rebs: Brownlee 16; Asts: Brownlee 5	Pts: Lee 24; Rebs: Christmas 14; Asts: Jalalon 4

Mall of Asia Arena, Pasay
Referees: P. Balao, R. Dacanay, M. Flordeliza, N. Cortez

ESPN5

July 23
4:30 pm

Box score

Barangay Ginebra San Miguel 106, Magnolia Hotshots Pambansang Manok 80
Scoring by quarter: 24–23, 23–16, 40–21, 19–20
Pts: Brownlee 30; Rebs: Brownlee 9 Asts: Tenorio 7	Pts: Barroca 17; Rebs: Jalalon 10; Asts: Jalalon 6
Barangay Ginebra wins series, 2–0

Smart Araneta Coliseum, Quezon City
Referees: N. Quilinguen, R. Gruta, J. Borja, J. Baldago

== Semifinals ==
Both series are best-of-five playoffs.

=== (1) TNT vs. (4) Barangay Ginebra ===
ESPN5

July 26
7:00 pm

Box score

TNT KaTropa 95, Barangay Ginebra San Miguel 92
Scoring by quarter: 23–24, 28–26, 19–28, 25–14
Pts: Jones, Rosario 24; Rebs: Jones 12; Asts: Jones 7	Pts: Brownlee 23; Rebs: Brownlee 15; Asts: Brownlee 9

Smart Araneta Coliseum, Quezon City
Referees: J. Mariano, R. Yante, M. Montoya, M. Orioste

ESPN5

July 28
6:15 pm

Box score

TNT KaTropa 88, Barangay Ginebra San Miguel 71
Scoring by quarter: 21–21, 30–21, 17–13, 20–16
Pts: Castro 20; Rebs: Jones 19; Asts: Jones 10	Pts: Brownlee 25; Rebs: Brownlee 13; Asts: Tenorio 5

Smart Araneta Coliseum, Quezon City
Referees: P. Balao, S. Pineda, J. Tantay, J. Baldago

ESPN5

July 30
7:00 pm

Box score

TNT KaTropa 72, Barangay Ginebra San Miguel 80
Scoring by quarter: 14–21, 18–21, 25–15, 15–23
Pts: Jones 24; Rebs: Jones 18; Asts: Castro 7	Pts: Tenorio 16; Rebs: Aguilar, Brownlee 11; Asts: Brownlee 8

Mall of Asia Arena, Pasay
Referees: N. Quilinguen, M. Montoya, R. Dacanay, J. Narandan

ESPN5

August 1
7:00 pm

Box score

TNT KaTropa 103, Barangay Ginebra San Miguel 92
Scoring by quarter: 32–32, 26–30, 28–17, 17–13
Pts: Jones 24; Rebs: Jones 13; Asts: Jones 10	Pts: Aguilar, Brownlee 27; Rebs: three players 9 Asts: Brownlee 8
TNT wins series, 3–1

Smart Araneta Coliseum, Quezon City
Referees: S. Pineda, R. Gruta, J. Nicandro, J. Baldago

=== (6) Rain or Shine vs. (7) San Miguel Beermen ===
ESPN5

July 27
6:30 pm

Box score

Rain or Shine Elasto Painters 105, San Miguel Beermen 111
Scoring by quarter: 27–19, 25–27, 31–39, 22–26
Pts: Montgomery 20; Rebs: Montgomery 17; Asts: Mocon 8	Pts: McCullough 32; Rebs: McCullough 14; Asts: Cabagnot 7

Smart Araneta Coliseum, Quezon City
Referees: P. Balao, R. Gruta, J. Nicandro, A. Nubla

ESPN5

July 29
7:00 pm

Box score

Rain or Shine Elasto Painters 105, San Miguel Beermen 117
Scoring by quarter: 34–13, 18–36, 21–40, 32–28
Pts: Montgomery 24; Rebs: Montgomery 15; Asts: Montgomery 6	Pts: Ross 34; Rebs: Fajardo 15; Asts: Ross 8

Mall of Asia Arena, Pasay
Referees: J. Mariano, R. Dacanay, J. Baldago, J. Tantay

ESPN5

July 31
7:00 pm

Box score

Rain or Shine Elasto Painters 112, San Miguel Beermen 104
Scoring by quarter: 30–16, 24–38, 32–26, 26–24
Pts: Montgomery 25; Rebs: Montgomery 15; Asts: Belga 6	Pts: McCullough 51; Rebs: McCullough 14; Asts: Ross 7

Smart Araneta Coliseum, Quezon City
Referees: P. Balao, R. Gruta, M. Montoya, M. Orioste

ESPN5

August 2
7:00 pm

Box score

Rain or Shine Elasto Painters 95, San Miguel Beermen 98
Scoring by quarter: 26–32, 18–9, 31–31, 26–20
Pts: Montgomery 18; Rebs: Montgomery 17; Asts: Montgomery 7	Pts: McCullough 35; Rebs: McCullough 18; Asts: Ross 8
San Miguel wins series, 3–1

Smart Araneta Coliseum, Quezon City
Referees: N. Quilinguen, S. Pineda, J. Narandan, J. Nicandro

== Finals ==
ESPN5

August 4
6:30 pm

Box score

TNT KaTropa 109, San Miguel Beermen 96

Smart Araneta Coliseum, Quezon City

ESPN5

August 7
7:00 pm

Box score

TNT KaTropa 125, San Miguel Beermen 127 (2OT)

Smart Araneta Coliseum, Quezon City

ESPN5

August 9
7:00 pm

Box score

TNT KaTropa 115, San Miguel Beermen 105

Smart Araneta Coliseum, Quezon City

ESPN5

August 11
6:35 pm

Box score

TNT KaTropa 101, San Miguel Beermen 106

Smart Araneta Coliseum, Quezon City

ESPN5

August 14
7:00 pm

Box score

TNT KaTropa 94, San Miguel Beermen 99

Smart Araneta Coliseum, Quezon City

ESPN5

August 16
7:00 pm

Box score

TNT KaTropa 90, San Miguel Beermen 102
San Miguel wins series, 4–2

Smart Araneta Coliseum, Quezon City

== Imports ==
The following is the list of imports, which had played for their respective teams at least once, with the returning imports in italics. Highlighted are the imports who stayed with their respective teams for the whole conference.

Team	Name	Debuted	Last game	Record
Alaska Aces	(United States) Chris Daniels	May 19 (vs. Columbian)	June 21 (vs. San Miguel)	4–3
Alaska Aces	(United States) Nino Johnson	June 15 (vs. Phoenix)		0–1
Alaska Aces	(United States) Diamon Simpson	June 30 (vs. Barangay Ginebra)	July 24 (vs. TNT)	2–4
Barangay Ginebra San Miguel	(United States) Justin Brownlee	May 24 (vs. Blackwater)	August 1 (vs. TNT)	10–7
Blackwater Elite	(United States) Alex Stepheson	May 19 (vs. Meralco)	June 8 (vs.NLEX)	5–1
Blackwater Elite	No import	June 14 (vs. San Miguel), June 22 (vs. NorthPort)		0–2
Blackwater Elite	(United States) Staphon Blair	July 5 (vs. Magnolia)	July 14 (vs. Alaska)	2–1
Blackwater Elite	(United States) Greg Smith	July 20 (vs. Rain or Shine)	July 25 (vs. Rain or Shine)	1–2
Columbian Dyip	(United States) Kyle Barone	May 19 (vs. Alaska)	June 1 (vs. NLEX)	1–3
Columbian Dyip	(Dominica) Lester Prosper	June 16 (vs. Magnolia)	July 14 (vs. Barangay Ginbera)	2–5
Magnolia Hotshots Pambansang Manok	(United States) John Fields	June 5 (vs. Alaska)		0–1
Magnolia Hotshots Pambansang Manok	(United States) James Farr	June 12 (vs. NorthPort)	July 10 (vs. Rain or Shine)	5–4
Magnolia Hotshots Pambansang Manok	(United States) Rakeem Christmas	July 17 (vs. TNT)	July 23 (vs. Barangay Ginebra)	0–3
Meralco Bolts	(Nigeria) Gani Lawal	May 19 (vs. Blackwater)	June 19 (vs. NLEX)	3–4
Meralco Bolts	(United States) Jimmie Taylor	June 15 (vs.TNT)		0–1
Meralco Bolts	(United States) Delroy James	June 29 (vs. Magnolia)	July 19 (vs. Alaska)	1–3
NLEX Road Warriors	(United States) Curtis Washington	May 22 (vs. TNT)		0–1
NLEX Road Warriors	No import	May 25 (vs. NorthPort)		0–1
NLEX Road Warriors	(United States) Tony Mitchell	May 29 (vs. Alaska)	June 23 (vs. Barangay Ginebra)	1–5
NLEX Road Warriors	(Nigeria) Olu Ashaolu	June 28 (vs. Rain or Shine)	July 12 (vs. Phoenix)	2–1
NorthPort Batang Pier	(United Kingdom) Prince Ibeh	May 22 (vs. Alaska)	July 24 (vs. San Miguel)	9–4
Phoenix Pulse Fuel Masters	(United States) Robert Dozier	May 31 (vs. Blackwater)	June 2 (vs. TNT)	1–1
Phoenix Pulse Fuel Masters	(Israel) Richard Howell	June 7 (vs. Meralco)	July 12 (vs. NLEX)	3–6
Rain or Shine Elasto Painters	(United States) Denzel Bowles	May 31 (vs. Meralco)	July 6 (vs. Alaska)	4–5
Rain or Shine Elasto Painters	(United States) Carl Montgomery	July 10 (vs. Magnolia)	August 2 (vs. San Miguel)	4–5
San Miguel Beermen	(United States) Charles Rhodes	June 5 (vs. NorthPort)	June 30 (vs. Columbian)	2–5
San Miguel Beermen	(United States) Chris McCullough	July 5 (vs. NLEX)	August 16 (vs. TNT)	12–4
TNT KaTropa	(United States) Terrence Jones	May 22 (vs. NLEX)	August 16 (vs. San Miguel)	16–7

== Awards ==
=== Conference ===
The Best Player and Best Import of the Conference awards were handed out prior to Game 4 of the Finals, at the Smart Araneta Coliseum:

- Best Player of the Conference: Jayson Castro (TNT KaTropa)
- Best Import of the Conference: Terrence Jones (TNT KaTropa)
- Finals MVP: Terrence Romeo (San Miguel Beermen)

=== Players of the Week ===
Week	Player	Ref.
May 19–26	Bobby Ray Parks Jr. (Blackwater Elite)	
May 27 – June 2	CJ Perez (Columbian Dyip)	
June 3–9	Rey Nambatac (Rain or Shine Elasto Painters)	
June 10–16	Roger Pogoy (TNT KaTropa)	
June 17–23	Robert Bolick (NorthPort Batang Pier)	
June 24–30	Matthew Wright (Phoenix Pulse Fuel Masters)	
July 1–7	Jayson Castro (TNT KaTropa)	
July 8–14	June Mar Fajardo (San Miguel Beermen)	
July 15–21	Chris Banchero (Alaska Aces)	
July 22–28	Troy Rosario (TNT KaTropa)	

=== Rookies of the Month ===
Month	Player	Ref.
May	Bobby Ray Parks Jr. (Blackwater Elite)	
June	Robert Bolick (NorthPort Batang Pier)	
July	Javee Mocon (Rain or Shine Elasto Painters)	

== Statistics ==
=== Individual statistical leaders ===
==== Local players ====
Category	Player	Team	Statistic
Points per game	CJ Perez	Columbian Dyip	22.7
Rebounds per game	June Mar Fajardo	San Miguel Beermen	10.4
Assists per game	Jayson Castro	TNT KaTropa	6.2
Assists per game	Rashawn McCarthy	Columbian Dyip	6.2
Steals per game	Sean Anthony	NorthPort Batang Pier	2.3
Blocks per game	June Mar Fajardo	San Miguel Beermen	1.5
Turnovers per game	Matthew Wright	Phoenix Pulse Fuel Masters	4.3
Fouls per game	Jackson Corpuz	Columbian Dyip	4.8
Minutes per game	CJ Perez	Columbian Dyip	39.8
FG%	Jackson Corpuz	Columbian Dyip	58.2%
FT%	Marcio Lassiter	San Miguel Beermen	100.0%
3FG%	Paul Lee	Magnolia Hotshots Pambansang Manok	43.5%
Double-doubles	June Mar Fajardo	San Miguel Beermen	13
Triple-doubles	Jayson Castro	TNT KaTropa	1
Triple-doubles	Chris Ross	San Miguel Beermen	1

==== Import players ====
Category	Player	Team	Statistic
Points per game	Lester Prosper	Columbian Dyip	32.3
Rebounds per game	Alex Stepheson	Blackwater Elite	22.0
Assists per game	Terrence Jones	TNT KaTropa	7.3
Steals per game	Justin Brownlee	Barangay Ginebra San Miguel	2.7
Blocks per game	Prince Ibeh	NorthPort Batang Pier	4.0
Turnovers per game	Terrence Jones	TNT KaTropa	5.3
Fouls per game	Prince Ibeh	NorthPort Batang Pier	3.9
Minutes per game	Justin Brownlee	Barangay Ginebra San Miguel	45.2
FG%	Prince Ibeh	NorthPort Batang Pier	62.5%
FT%	Lester Prosper	Columbian Dyip	80.0%
3FG%	Kyle Barone	Columbian Dyip	44.0%
Double-doubles	Terrence Jones	TNT KaTropa	22
Triple-doubles	Terrence Jones	TNT KaTropa	5

=== Individual game highs ===
==== Local players ====
Category	Player	Team	Statistic
Points	CJ Perez	Columbian Dyip	39
Rebounds	June Mar Fajardo (twice)	San Miguel Beermen	19
Assists	Jayson Castro	TNT KaTropa	15
Steals	Sean Anthony	NorthPort Batang Pier	5
Steals	Roger Pogoy	TNT KaTropa	5
Steals	Chris Ross	San Miguel Beermen	5
Blocks	nine players (16 occasions)		3
Three point field goals	Roger Pogoy	TNT KaTropa	10
Three point field goals	Chris Ross	San Miguel Beermen	10

==== Import players ====
Category	Player	Team	Statistic
Points	Chris McCullough	San Miguel Beermen	51
Rebounds	Alex Stepheson	Blackwater Elite	31
Assists	Terrence Jones	TNT KaTropa	16
Steals	Richard Howell	Phoenix Pulse Fuel Masters	7
Blocks	Alex Stepheson	Blackwater Elite	7
Blocks	Terrence Jones	TNT KaTropa	7
Blocks	Prince Ibeh (twice)	NorthPort Batang Pier	7
Three point field goals	Justin Brownlee	Barangay Ginebra San Miguel	8

=== Team statistical leaders ===
Category	Team	Statistic
Points per game	Columbian Dyip	106.9
Rebounds per game	NorthPort Batang Pier	52.0
Assists per game	Barangay Ginebra San Miguel	25.5
Steals per game	NorthPort Batang Pier	8.8
Blocks per game	San Miguel Beermen	5.7
Turnovers per game	NLEX Road Warriors	19.5
FG%	Barangay Ginebra San Miguel	45.7%
FT%	Phoenix Pulse Fuel Masters	74.4%
3FG%	San Miguel Beermen	34.7%
