= 2019 PBA Commissioner's Cup finals =

Philippines basketball tournament

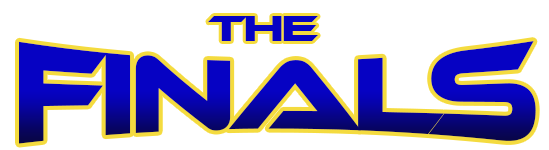
Team	Coach	Wins
(7) San Miguel Beermen	Leo Austria	4
(1) TNT KaTropa	Bong Ravena	2
- Dates: August 4–16, 2019
- MVP: Terrence Romeo (San Miguel Beermen)
- Television: Local: ESPN5; 5 PBA Rush (HD); International: AksyonTV International
- Announcers: see Broadcast notes
- Radio network: Radyo5 (DWFM)
- Announcers: see Broadcast notes

Referees
- Game 1: N. Quilingen, S. Pineda, J. Narandan, M. Orioste
- Game 2: N. Quilinguen, S. Pineda, M. Montoya, A. Nubla
- Game 3: J. Mariano, R. Gruta, M. Flordeliza, J. Tantay
- Game 4: N. Quilinguen, S. Pineda, A. Nubla, J. Baldago
- Game 5: N. Quilinguen, S. Pineda, J. Nicandro, J. Baldago
- Game 6: P. Balao, S. Pineda, R. Dacanay, A. Nubla

PBA Commissioner's Cup finals chronology
- < 2018 2022–23 >

PBA finals chronology
- < 2019 Philippine 2019 Governors' >

The 2019 Philippine Basketball Association (PBA) Commissioner's Cup finals was the best-of-7 championship series of the 2019 PBA Commissioner's Cup, and the conclusion of the conference's playoffs. The San Miguel Beermen and the TNT KaTropa competed for the 19th Commissioner's Cup championship and the 126th overall championship contested by the league.

The Beermen ties the Barangay Ginebra Kings to become the second 7th seed team and the lowest seed to win a PBA championship since Barangay Ginebra did it in the 2004 PBA Fiesta Conference.

== Background ==
=== Road to the finals ===
San Miguel Beermen		TNT KaTropa
Finished 5–6 (.455): Tied with Magnolia and Rain or Shine in 5th place	Elimination round	Finished 10–1 (.909) in 1st place
Head-to-head quotient: Magnolia 1.19, Rain or Shine 1.01, San Miguel 0.83 (7th place)	Tiebreaker	—N/a
Def. NorthPort in two games (twice-to-win disadvantage)	Quarterfinals	Def. Alaska in two games (twice-to-beat advantage)
Def. Rain or Shine, 3–1	Semifinals	Def. Barangay Ginebra, 3–1

=== Head-to-head matchup ===
ESPN5

June 8
6:45 pm

Box score

San Miguel Beermen 97, TNT KaTropa 110
Scoring by quarter: 20–35, 21–22, 23–30, 33–23
Pts: Pessumal 24; Rebs: Fajardo 13; Asts: Ross 8	Pts: Jones 30; Rebs: Jones 18; Asts: Castro 15

Ynares Center, Antipolo
Referees: N. Quilinguen, S. Pineda, M. Orioste, N. Cortez

== Series summary ==
Game	Date	Venue	Winner	Result
Game 1	August 4	Smart Araneta Coliseum	TNT	109–96
Game 2	August 7	Smart Araneta Coliseum	San Miguel	127–125 (2OT)
Game 3	August 9	Smart Araneta Coliseum	TNT	115–105
Game 4	August 11	Smart Araneta Coliseum	San Miguel	106–101
Game 5	August 14	Smart Araneta Coliseum	San Miguel	99–94
Game 6	August 16	Smart Araneta Coliseum	San Miguel	102–90

== Game summaries ==
=== Game 1 ===
ESPN5

August 4
6:30 pm

Box score

San Miguel Beermen 96, TNT KaTropa 109
Scoring by quarter: 19–35, 23–25, 30–27, 24–22
Pts: McCullough 33; Rebs: McCullough 15; Asts: Ross 7	Pts: Jones 41; Rebs: Jones 12; Asts: Jones 8
TNT leads series, 1–0

Smart Araneta Coliseum, Quezon City
Referees: N. Quilingen, S. Pineda, J. Narandan, M. Orioste

=== Game 2 ===
ESPN5

August 7
7:00 pm

Box score

San Miguel Beermen 127, TNT KaTropa 125 (2OT)
Scoring by quarter: 32–25, 27–20, 25–32, 22–29, Overtime: 8–8, 13–11
Pts: McCullough 32; Rebs: McCullough 22; Asts: Cabagnot, McCullough 7	Pts: Rosario 34; Rebs: Jones 13; Asts: Castro 12
Series tied, 1–1

Smart Araneta Coliseum, Quezon City
Referees: N. Quilinguen, S. Pineda, M. Montoya, A. Nubla

=== Game 3 ===
ESPN5

August 9
7:00 pm

Box score

San Miguel Beermen 105, TNT KaTropa 115
Scoring by quarter: 33–18, 17–37, 28–31, 27–29
Pts: Fajardo, McCullough 27; Rebs: Fajardo, McCullough 13; Asts: Romeo, Ross 5	Pts: Jones 37; Rebs: Jones 18; Asts: Jones 9
TNT leads series, 2–1

Smart Araneta Coliseum, Quezon City
Referees: J. Mariano, R. Gruta, M. Flordeliza, J. Tantay

=== Game 4 ===
ESPN5

August 11
6:35 pm

Box score

San Miguel Beermen 106, TNT KaTropa 101
Scoring by quarter: 31–22, 20–30, 31–17, 24–32
Pts: McCullough 27; Rebs: McCullough 22; Asts: Ross 8	Pts: Jones 32; Rebs: Jones 16; Asts: Castro 8
Series tied, 2–2

Smart Araneta Coliseum, Quezon City
Attendance: 13,578
Referees: N. Quilinguen, S. Pineda, A. Nubla, J. Baldago

=== Game 5 ===
ESPN5

August 14
7:00 pm

Box score

San Miguel Beermen 99, TNT KaTropa 94
Scoring by quarter: 22–28, 23–21, 24–31, 30 –14
Pts: McCullough 35; Rebs: McCullough 22; Asts: Romeo 5	Pts: Jones 35; Rebs: Jones 17; Asts: Jones 8
San Miguel leads series, 3–2

Smart Araneta Coliseum, Quezon City
Referees: N. Quilinguen, S. Pineda, J. Nicandro, J. Baldago

=== Game 6 ===
ESPN5

August 16
7:00 pm

Box score

San Miguel Beermen 102, TNT KaTropa 90
Scoring by quarter: 26–19, 19–16, 29–28, 28–27
Pts: McCullough 35; Rebs: Fajardo, McCullough 13; Asts: Romeo, Ross 7	Pts: Jones 41; Rebs: Jones 12; Asts: Castro 6
San Miguel wins series, 4–2

Smart Araneta Coliseum, Quezon City
Attendance: 12,447
Referees: P. Balao, S. Pineda, R. Dacanay, A. Nubla

== Rosters ==
San Miguel Beermen roster
Players
Coaches

Pos.	#	POB	Name	Height	Weight	DOB (YYYY–MM–DD)	From
F/C	1	(United States)	Chris McCullough (I)	6 ft 9 in (2.06 m)	200 lb (91 kg)	1995–02–05	Syracuse
F/C	2	(Philippines)	Billy Mamaril	6 ft 6 in (1.98 m)	225 lb (102 kg)	1980–06–25	Bakersfield
G/F	3	(Philippines)	Von Pessumal	6 ft 2 in (1.88 m)	185 lb (84 kg)	1993–02–12	Ateneo
G	5	(Philippines)	Alex Cabagnot	6 ft 0 in (1.83 m)	185 lb (84 kg)	1982–12–08	Hawaiʻi–Hilo
G	6	(United States)	Chris Ross	6 ft 2 in (1.88 m)	180 lb (82 kg)	1985–03–09	Marshall
G	7	(Philippines)	Terrence Romeo	5 ft 11 in (1.80 m)	178 lb (81 kg)	1992–03–16	Far Eastern
G	12	(Philippines)	Paul Zamar	5 ft 10 in (1.78 m)	179 lb (81 kg)	1987–10–20	UE
G/F	13	(United States)	Marcio Lassiter (injured)	6 ft 2 in (1.88 m)	185 lb (84 kg)	1987–05–16	Cal State Fullerton
C	15	(Philippines)	June Mar Fajardo	6 ft 11 in (2.11 m)	268 lb (122 kg)	1989–11–17	Cebu
G/F	18	(Philippines)	Louie Vigil	6 ft 3 in (1.91 m)		1991–09–26	UST
G/F	22	(Philippines)	Matt Ganuelas-Rosser	6 ft 5 in (1.96 m)	186 lb (84 kg)	1990–06–13	Cal Poly Pomona
G	26	(Philippines)	Chico Lanete	6 ft 0 in (1.83 m)	180 lb (82 kg)	1979–08–01	Lyceum
F	29	(Philippines)	Arwind Santos (C)	6 ft 4 in (1.93 m)	175 lb (79 kg)	1981–06–10	Far Eastern
F/C	30	(United States)	Kelly Nabong	6 ft 6 in (1.98 m)	227 lb (103 kg)	1988–11–17	SRJC
F/C	34	(Germany)	Christian Standhardinger	6 ft 8 in (2.03 m)	220 lb (100 kg)	1989–07–04	Hawaiʻi
G/F	71	(Philippines)	Ronald Tubid	6 ft 1 in (1.85 m)	185 lb (84 kg)	1981–10–15	UE
C	95	(Philippines)	Yancy de Ocampo (IN)	6 ft 9 in (2.06 m)	245 lb (111 kg)	1980–03–11	Saint Francis of Assisi

Head coach

- (Philippines) Leo Austria

Assistant coach(es)

- (Philippines) Peter Martin (1st assistant)
- (Philippines) Ato Agustin
- (United States) Jimmy Alapag
- (Philippines) Jorge Gallent
- (Philippines) Dayong Mendoza
- (Philippines) Biboy Ravanes
- (Philippines) Boyzie Zamar

Team manager

- (Philippines) Gee Abanilla
- (Philippines) Daniel Henares (assistant)

Legend

- (C) Team captain
- (CI) Commissioner's Cup Import
- (GI) Governors' Cup Import
- (EI) EASL Import
- (DP) Unsigned draft pick
- (FA) Free agent
- (IN) Inactive
- (S) Suspended
- (R) Rookie
- Injured

Roster

TNT KaTropa roster
Players
Coaches

Pos.	#	POB	Name	Height	Weight	DOB (YYYY–MM–DD)	From
G	0	(Philippines)	Brian Heruela	5 ft 10 in (1.78 m)	195 lb (88 kg)	1989–04–13	Cebu
F	1	(United States)	Terrence Jones (I)	6 ft 9 in (2.06 m)	255 lb (116 kg)	1992–01–09	Kentucky
F	4	(United States)	Harvey Carey	6 ft 3 in (1.91 m)	210 lb (95 kg)	1979–03–18	Sonoma State
F/C	5	(Philippines)	Frank Golla	6 ft 5 in (1.96 m)	290 lb (132 kg)	1990–01–17	Ateneo
G/F	6	(Philippines)	Don Trollano	6 ft 3 in (1.91 m)	182 lb (83 kg)	1992–01–07	Adamson
G	10	(Philippines)	Ryan Reyes	6 ft 2 in (1.88 m)	190 lb (86 kg)	1983–08–10	Cal State Fullerton
F/C	12	(Philippines)	Marion Magat	6 ft 7 in (2.01 m)	180 lb (82 kg)	1989–10–22	National-U
F	13	(Australia)	Anthony Semerad	6 ft 4 in (1.93 m)	220 lb (100 kg)	1991–04–25	San Beda
F	14	(Australia)	David Semerad	6 ft 4 in (1.93 m)	220 lb (100 kg)	1991–04–25	San Beda
G/F	16	(Philippines)	Roger Pogoy	6 ft 3 in (1.91 m)	180 lb (82 kg)	1992–06–16	Far Eastern
G	17	(Philippines)	Jayson Castro (C)	5 ft 10 in (1.78 m)	185 lb (84 kg)	1986–06–30	Philippine Christian
F/C	18	(Philippines)	Troy Rosario	6 ft 7 in (2.01 m)	198 lb (90 kg)	1992–01–20	National-U
F/C	19	(Philippines)	Ken Bono	6 ft 5 in (1.96 m)	280 lb (127 kg)	1984–06–19	Adamson
F/C	21	(United States)	Kelly Williams (IN)	6 ft 6 in (1.98 m)	215 lb (98 kg)	1982–02–07	Oakland
F	32	(Philippines)	Jay Washington	6 ft 7 in (2.01 m)	210 lb (95 kg)	1981–10–10	Eckerd
G	40	(Philippines)	John Karlo Casiño	5 ft 10 in (1.78 m)	170 lb (77 kg)		Centro Escolar
C	99	(Palestine)	Yousef Taha	6 ft 7 in (2.01 m)	240 lb (109 kg)	1988–07–08	Mapúa

Head coach

- (Philippines) Bong Ravena

Assistant coach(es)

- (Philippines) Sandy Arespacochaga (1st assistant)
- (Philippines) Yurri Escueta
- (United States) Alton Lister
- (Philippines) Joshua Reyes
- (New Zealand) Mark Dickel (consultant)

Team manager

- (Philippines) Gabby Cui
- (Philippines) Miguel Fernandez (assistant)

Legend

- (C) Team captain
- (CI) Commissioner's Cup Import
- (GI) Governors' Cup Import
- (EI) EASL Import
- (DP) Unsigned draft pick
- (FA) Free agent
- (IN) Inactive
- (S) Suspended
- (R) Rookie
- Injured

Roster

== Broadcast notes ==
The Philippine Cup finals were aired on TV5 with simulcasts on PBA Rush (both in standard and high definition). 5's radio arm, Radyo5 provided the radio play-by-play coverage.

ESPN5 will also provide online livestreaming via their official YouTube account using the TV5 feed.

The PBA Rush broadcast will provide English-language coverage of the finals.

Game	ESPN5			PBA Rush (English)		
Game	Play-by-play	Analyst(s)	Courtside reporters	Play-by-play	Analyst(s)	Courtside reporters
Game 1	Sev Sarmenta	Dominic Uy	Carla Lizardo	Carlo Pamintuan	Andy Jao	Bea Escudero
Game 2	Chuck Araneta	Quinito Henson	Denise Tan	Carlo Pamintuan	Alex Compton	Bea Escudero
Game 3	Charlie Cuna	Andy Jao	Apple David	Chiqui Reyes	Richard del Rosario	Bea Escudero
Game 4	Magoo Marjon	Quinito Henson	Rizza Diaz	Carlo Pamintuan	Dominic Uy	Bea Escudero
Game 5	Sev Sarmenta	Ryan Gregorio	Selina Dagdag	Paolo del Rosario	Norman Black	Bea Escudero
Game 6	Charlie Cuna	Dominic Uy	Carla Lizardo	Carlo Pamintuan	Ryan Gregorio	Bea Escudero

- Additional Game 6 crew:
  - Trophy presentation: James Velazquez
  - Dugout celebration interviewer: Lyn Olavario
