= 2018 PBA Commissioner's Cup finals =

Basketball tournament in the Philippines

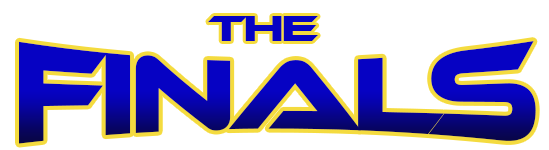
Team	Coach	Wins
(5) Barangay Ginebra San Miguel	Tim Cone	4
(6) San Miguel Beermen	Leo Austria	2
- Dates: July 27 – August 8, 2018
- MVP: Scottie Thompson (Barangay Ginebra San Miguel)
- Television: Local: ESPN5; The 5 Network; PBA Rush (HD); International: AksyonTV International
- Announcers: see Broadcast notes
- Radio network: Radyo5 (DWFM)
- Announcers: see Broadcast notes

Referees
- Game 1: N. Quilinguen, N. Guevarra, S. Pineda, J. Narandan
- Game 2: P. Balao, J. Mariano, R. Yante, M. Montoya
- Game 3: N. Quilinguen, S. Pineda, E. Tangkion, J. Narandan
- Game 4: N. Quilinguen, N. Guevarra, J. Mariano, J. Narandan
- Game 5: P. Balao, S. Pineda, M. Montoya, J. Narandan
- Game 6: N. Quilinguen, J. Mariano, R. Gruta, R. Yante

PBA Commissioner's Cup finals chronology
- < 2017 2019 >

PBA finals chronology
- < 2017–18 Philippine 2018 Governors' >

The 2018 Philippine Basketball Association (PBA) Commissioner's Cup finals was the best-of-7 championship series of the 2018 PBA Commissioner's Cup and the conclusion of the conference's playoffs. The Barangay Ginebra San Miguel and the San Miguel Beermen competed for the 18th Commissioner's Cup championship and the 123rd overall championship contested by the league.

This was the sixth finals match-up between the two teams, with the Beermen winning four of the first five series. They last met during the 2016–17 Philippine Cup finals which the Beermen won, 4–1. Barangay Ginebra's sole series win came during the 2007 Philippine Cup finals.

The series highlighted the match-up between former PBA Best Player of the Conference (2017 Governors') and 4-time All-Star Greg Slaughter and 4-time MVP June Mar Fajardo, arguably two of the best centers in recent PBA history, who last faced each other in a finals series during their college days in CESAFI in 2009, which Slaughter's University of Visayas won. The series also featured the match-up between the PBA Best Import of the Conference award front-runners Justin Brownlee and Renaldo Balkman, who won a title as teammates with the San Miguel Alab Pilipinas of the ABL three months back.

Barangay Ginebra won the series in six games to win their first Commissioner's Cup title since 1997. This also marked San Miguel's only Finals loss under head coach Leo Austria. Scottie Thompson was named the Finals MVP.

== Background ==
=== Barangay Ginebra San Miguel ===
This was Barangay Ginebra's fourth Commissioner's Cup finals and 25th overall. They last appeared in a Comm's Cup finals in 2013, with their last Commissioner's Cup title coming in 1997.

=== San Miguel Beermen ===
This was the Beermen's 40th finals appearance, who won all of their six previous finals in the last ten conferences. This was their sixth Commissioner's Cup finals appearance, and was the defending champion entering the series having won the previous year's series.

=== Road to the finals ===
Barangay Ginebra San Miguel		San Miguel Beermen
Finished 6–5 (.545): Tied with San Miguel and Magnolia in 5th place	Elimination round	Finished 6–5 (.545): Tied with Barangay Ginebra and Magnolia in 5th place
Barangay Ginebra (5th): 1.07; San Miguel (6th): 1.02; Magnolia (7th): 0.92	Tiebreaker*	Barangay Ginebra (5th): 1.07; San Miguel (6th): 1.02; Magnolia (7th): 0.92
Def. Meralco in 2–0 (best-of-three)	Quarterfinals	Def. TNT in 2–0 (best-of-three)
Def. Rain or Shine, 3–1	Semifinals	Def. Alaska, 3–1

=== Head-to-head matchup ===
June 3

Box score

Barangay Ginebra San Miguel 97, San Miguel Beermen 104 (OT)
Scoring by quarter: 20–23, 23–24, 30–24, 20–22, Overtime: 4–11
Pts: Brownlee 18; Rebs: Thompson 15; Asts: Brownlee, Thompson 7	Pts: Balkman 27; Rebs: Fajardo 19; Asts: Cabagnot 8

Mall of Asia Arena, Pasay
Referees: N. Quilingen, N. Guevarra, R. Yante, J. Borja

== Series summary ==
Game	Date	Venue	Winner	Result
Game 1	Friday, July 27	Smart Araneta Coliseum	Barangay Ginebra	127–99
Game 2	Sunday, July 29	Smart Araneta Coliseum	San Miguel	134–109
Game 3	Wednesday, August 1	Smart Araneta Coliseum	San Miguel	132–94
Game 4	Friday, August 3	Smart Araneta Coliseum	Barangay Ginebra	130–100
Game 5	Sunday, August 5	Smart Araneta Coliseum	Barangay Ginebra	87–83
Game 6	Wednesday, August 8	Mall of Asia Arena	Barangay Ginebra	93–77

== Game summaries ==
=== Game 1 ===
ESPN 5

July 27
7:00 pm

Box score

Barangay Ginebra San Miguel 127, San Miguel Beermen 99
Scoring by quarter: 35–20, 34–30, 25–25, 33–24
Pts: Brownlee 42; Rebs: Brownlee, Slaughter 7 Asts: Brownlee 9	Pts: Balkman 27; Rebs: Balkman 13; Asts: Cabagnot 7
Barangay Ginebra leads series, 1–0

Smart Araneta Coliseum, Quezon City
Attendance: 11,883
Referees: N. Quilinguen, N. Guevarra, S. Pineda, J. Narandan

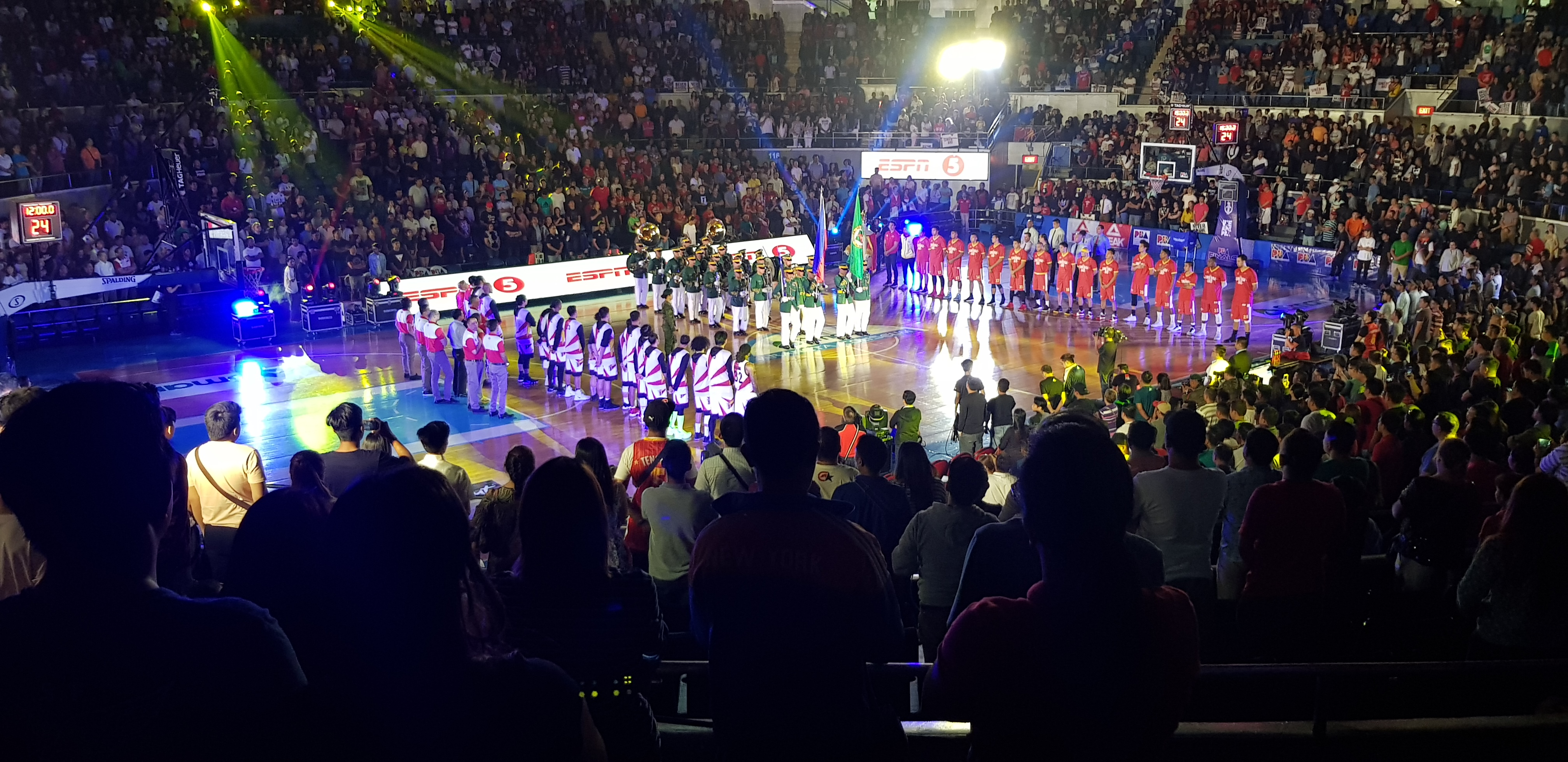
The players of San Miguel and Barangay Ginebra during the player introductions before the start of Game 1.

Entering the game, Barangay Ginebra won 10 of their last 11 games and had the momentum to start strong in the series. They got into a fast start, leading by 15 in the first quarter and 19 after the half. Import Justin Brownlee was red-hot, having scored 29 points at halftime, with 18 coming in the first period. The Beemen tried to stage a comeback in the second half and was trailing by 19 after three quarters. However, Barangay Ginebra started the last period with a 25–5 run for a 39-point advantage, 119–80, the largest of the game. They never looked backed and dealt the Beermen their worst loss of the conference. Chris Ross tweaked his ankle in the fourth quarter and had to head to the locker room. After the game, he confirmed that he will be able to play in Game 2.

Brownlee led the Gin Kings with 42 points, 7 rebounds and 9 assists on 17-for-19 shooting and had support from the locals, with 4 other players scoring in double figures led by Joe Devance who had 22 points. For the Beermen, import Renaldo Balkman scored 27 points and top rookie Christian Standhardinger added 26, with four-time MVP June Mar Fajardo registering a double-double with 13 points and 12 rebounds.

Ginebra shot 62 percent from the field and shot 13-for-25 from the arc. San Miguel only shot 39% and was 7-for-29 from 3. Ginebra also registered 37 assists. During the third quarter, Devance scored his 500th 3-point field goal made. He was the 41st PBA player and 19th among active players to reach that milestone.

=== Game 2 ===
ESPN 5

July 29
6:30 pm

Box score

Barangay Ginebra San Miguel 109, San Miguel Beermen 134
Scoring by quarter: 23–34, 23–41, 33–24, 30–35
Pts: Brownlee 29; Rebs: Thompson 7 Asts: Tenorio 7	Pts: Cabagnot 33; Rebs: Balkman 11; Asts: Cabagnot 9
Series tied, 1–1

Smart Araneta Coliseum, Quezon City
Attendance: 15,042
Referees: P. Balao, J. Mariano, R. Yante, M. Montoya

=== Game 3 ===
ESPN 5

August 1
7:00 pm

Box score

Barangay Ginebra San Miguel 94, San Miguel Beermen 132
Scoring by quarter: 27–30, 24–23, 21–39, 22–40
Pts: Brownlee 32; Rebs: Brownlee 11; Asts: Mercado, Thompson 4	Pts: Balkman 28; Rebs: Fajardo 15; Asts: Lassiter 9
San Miguel leads series, 2–1

Smart Araneta Coliseum, Quezon City
Referees: N. Quilinguen, S. Pineda, E. Tangkion, J. Narandan

=== Game 4 ===
ESPN 5

August 3
7:00 pm

Box score

Barangay Ginebra San Miguel 130, San Miguel Beermen 100
Scoring by quarter: 39–21, 28–31, 30–23, 33–25
Pts: Brownlee 37; Rebs: Brownlee 11; Asts: Thompson 8	Pts: Santos 22; Rebs: Fajardo 14; Asts: Cabagnot 6
Series tied, 2–2

Smart Araneta Coliseum, Quezon City
Attendance: 12,288
Referees: N. Quilinguen, N. Guevarra, J. Mariano, J. Narandan

=== Game 5 ===
ESPN 5

August 5
6:30 pm

Box score

Barangay Ginebra San Miguel 87, San Miguel Beermen 83
Scoring by quarter: 24–26, 16–14, 26–26, 21–17
Pts: Thompson 20; Rebs: Slaughter 13; Asts: Devance 6	Pts: Balkman 34; Rebs: Balkman 20; Asts: Ross 9
Barangay Ginebra leads series, 3–2

Smart Araneta Coliseum, Quezon City
Attendance: 16,958
Referees: P. Balao, S. Pineda, M. Montoya, J. Narandan

=== Game 6 ===
ESPN 5

August 8
7:00 pm

Box score

Barangay Ginebra San Miguel 93, San Miguel Beermen 77
Scoring by quarter: 14–17, 21–21, 27–8, 31–31
Pts: Brownlee 31; Rebs: Brownlee 19; Asts: Brownlee 7	Pts: Fajardo 29; Rebs: Fajardo 15; Asts: Heruela 4
Barangay Ginebra wins series, 4–2

Mall of Asia Arena, Pasay
Attendance: 20,490
Referees: N. Quilinguen, J. Mariano, R. Gruta, R. Yante

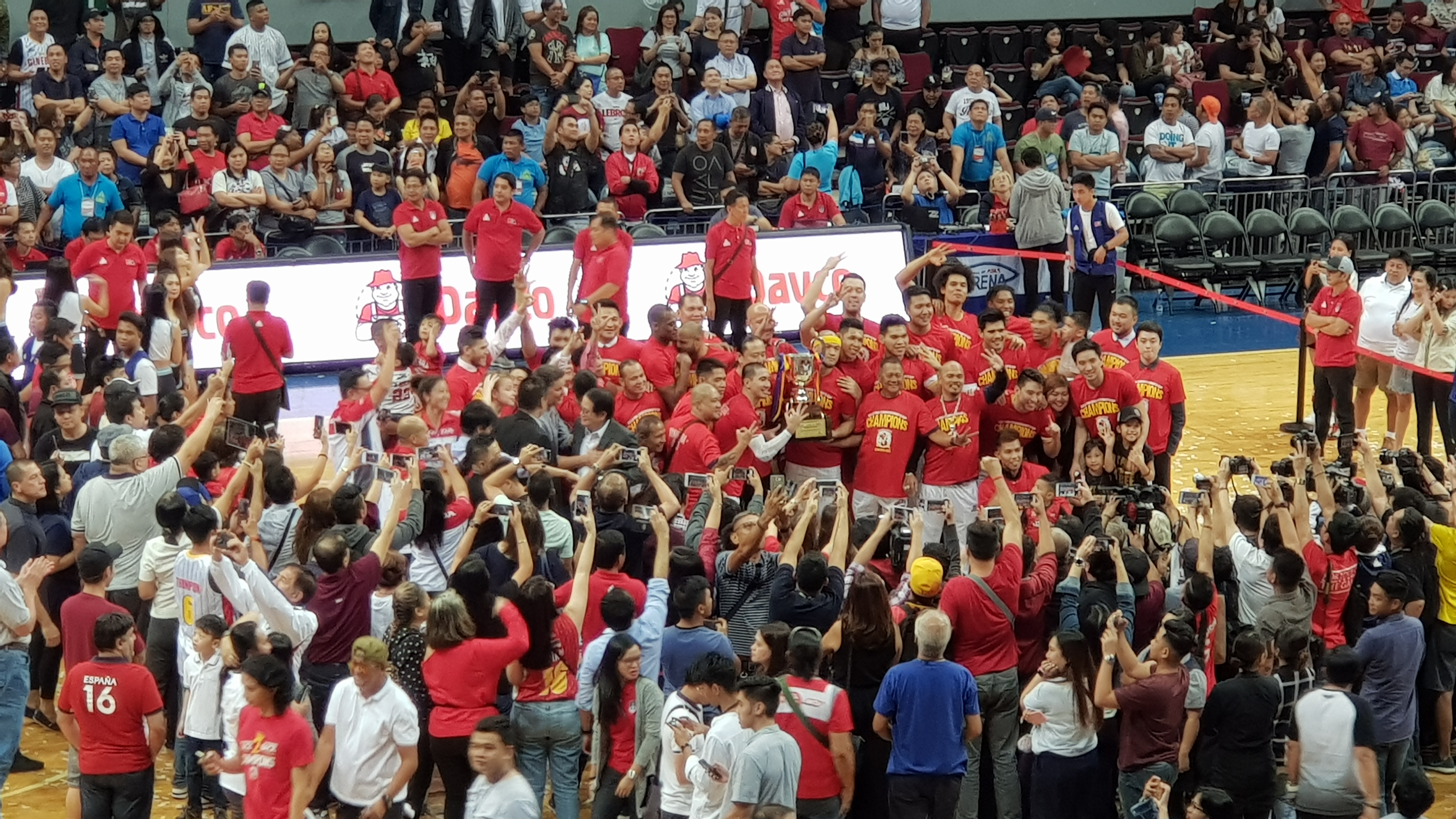
Barangay Ginebra San Miguel poses with the Commissioner's Cup trophy after winning their finals series against the San Miguel Beermen at the Mall of Asia Arena.

== Rosters ==
Barangay Ginebra San Miguel roster
Players
Coaches

Pos.	#	POB	Name	Height	Weight	DOB (YYYY–MM–DD)	From
G/F	1	(United States)	Julian Sargent (R)	6 ft 3 in (1.91 m)	202 lb (92 kg)	–07–15	De La Salle
G	2	(Philippines)	Jett Manuel (R)	6 ft 1 in (1.85 m)		1992–09–22	Philippines
G	3	(United States)	Sol Mercado	6 ft 1 in (1.85 m)	200 lb (91 kg)	1984–05–06	Biola
G	5	(Philippines)	LA Tenorio	5 ft 8 in (1.73 m)	151 lb (68 kg)	1984–07–09	Ateneo
G	6	(Philippines)	Scottie Thompson	6 ft 1 in (1.85 m)	180 lb (82 kg)	1993–07–12	UPHSD
C	12	(Philippines)	Prince Caperal	6 ft 7 in (2.01 m)	230 lb (104 kg)	1993–06–12	Arellano
F	14	(Philippines)	Kevin Ferrer	6 ft 4 in (1.93 m)	188 lb (85 kg)	1993–03–26	UST
G/F	16	(Philippines)	Jeff Chan	6 ft 2 in (1.88 m)	185 lb (84 kg)	1983–02–11	Far Eastern
C	20	(United States)	Greg Slaughter	7 ft 0 in (2.13 m)	258 lb (117 kg)	1988–05–19	Ateneo
F	21	(Philippines)	Arthur dela Cruz (injured)	6 ft 4 in (1.93 m)	210 lb (95 kg)	1992–05–09	San Beda
F/C	23	(Philippines)	Raymond Aguilar	6 ft 5 in (1.96 m)	200 lb (91 kg)	1985–07–27	National-U
F/C	25	(Philippines)	Japeth Aguilar	6 ft 9 in (2.06 m)	235 lb (107 kg)	1987–01–25	Western Kentucky
F	27	(Philippines)	Jervy Cruz	6 ft 4 in (1.93 m)	220 lb (100 kg)	1986–09–09	UST
F	31	(Philippines)	Aljon Mariano	6 ft 3 in (1.91 m)	175 lb (79 kg)	1992–08–03	UST
F	32	(United States)	Justin Brownlee (I)	6 ft 6 in (1.98 m)	220 lb (100 kg)	1988–04–23	St. John's
F	38	(United States)	Joe Devance	6 ft 7 in (2.01 m)	225 lb (102 kg)	1982–02–19	UTEP
G	47	(Philippines)	Mark Caguioa (C)	6 ft 1 in (1.85 m)	185 lb (84 kg)	1979–11–19	Glendale CC (CA)

Head coach

- (United States) Tim Cone

Assistant coach(es)

- (Philippines) Richard del Rosario (1st Assistant)
- (Philippines) Olsen Racela
- (Philippines) Freddie Abuda

Team manager

- (Philippines) Alfrancis Chua^{[a]}
- (Philippines) Raymond Rodriguez (Assistant)

Legend

- (C) Team captain
- (CI) Commissioner's Cup Import
- (GI) Governors' Cup Import
- (EI) EASL Import
- (DP) Unsigned draft pick
- (FA) Free agent
- (IN) Inactive
- (S) Suspended
- (R) Rookie
- Injured

Roster

- ^{a} Chua also serves as Barangay Ginebra's board governor.

San Miguel Beermen roster
Players
Coaches

Pos.	#	POB	Name	Height	Weight	DOB (YYYY–MM–DD)	From
G	1	(Philippines)	Brian Heruela	5 ft 10 in (1.78 m)	195 lb (88 kg)	1989–04–13	Cebu
F/C	2	(Philippines)	Billy Mamaril	6 ft 6 in (1.98 m)	225 lb (102 kg)	1980–06–25	Bakersfield
G/F	3	(Philippines)	Von Pessumal	6 ft 2 in (1.88 m)	185 lb (84 kg)	1993–02–12	Ateneo
G	5	(Philippines)	Alex Cabagnot	6 ft 0 in (1.83 m)	185 lb (84 kg)	1982–12–08	Hawaiʻi–Hilo
G	6	(United States)	Chris Ross	6 ft 2 in (1.88 m)	180 lb (82 kg)	1985–03–09	Marshall
G/F	13	(United States)	Marcio Lassiter	6 ft 2 in (1.88 m)	185 lb (84 kg)	1987–05–16	Cal State Fullerton
C	15	(Philippines)	June Mar Fajardo	6 ft 11 in (2.11 m)	268 lb (122 kg)	1989–11–17	Cebu
G/F	18	(Philippines)	Louie Vigil (R)	6 ft 3 in (1.91 m)		1991–09–26	UST
G/F	22	(Philippines)	Matt Ganuelas-Rosser	6 ft 5 in (1.96 m)	186 lb (84 kg)	1990–06–13	Cal Poly Pomona
G/F	23	(Philippines)	Keith Agovida	6 ft 2 in (1.88 m)	170 lb (77 kg)	1990–02–14	Arellano
G	26	(Philippines)	Chico Lanete	6 ft 0 in (1.83 m)	180 lb (82 kg)	1979–08–01	Lyceum
F	29	(Philippines)	Arwind Santos (C)	6 ft 4 in (1.93 m)	175 lb (79 kg)	1981–06–10	Far Eastern
F/C	30	(United States)	Kelly Nabong	6 ft 6 in (1.98 m)	227 lb (103 kg)	1988–11–17	SRJC
F	32	(Puerto Rico)	Renaldo Balkman (I)	6 ft 8 in (2.03 m)	210 lb (95 kg)	1984–07–14	South Carolina
F	33	(Australia)	David Semerad (injured)	6 ft 4 in (1.93 m)	220 lb (100 kg)	1991–04–25	San Beda
F/C	34	(Germany)	Christian Standhardinger (R)	6 ft 8 in (2.03 m)	220 lb (100 kg)	1989–07–04	Hawaiʻi
C	95	(Philippines)	Yancy de Ocampo	6 ft 9 in (2.06 m)	245 lb (111 kg)	1980–03–11	Saint Francis of Assisi

Head coach

- (Philippines) Leo Austria

Assistant coach(es)

- (Philippines) Peter Martin (1st Assistant)
- (Philippines) Biboy Ravanes
- (Philippines) Dayong Mendoza
- (Philippines) Boyzie Zamar
- (Philippines) Ato Agustin
- (Philippines) Jorge Gallent

Team manager

- (Philippines) Gelacio Abanilla
- (Philippines) Daniel Henares (Assistant)

Legend

- (C) Team captain
- (CI) Commissioner's Cup Import
- (GI) Governors' Cup Import
- (EI) EASL Import
- (DP) Unsigned draft pick
- (FA) Free agent
- (IN) Inactive
- (S) Suspended
- (R) Rookie
- Injured

Roster

== Broadcast notes ==
The 2018 Commissioner's Cup finals was on TV5 with simulcasts on PBA Rush (both in standard and high definition). TV5's radio arm, Radyo5 provided the radio play-by-play coverage.

ESPN5 provided online livestreaming via their official YouTube account using the TV5 feed.

The PBA Rush broadcast provided English-language coverage of the finals.

Game	ESPN5			PBA Rush (English)		
Game	Play-by-play	Analyst(s)	Courtside reporters	Play-by-play	Analyst(s)	Courtside reporters
Game 1	Magoo Marjon	Ryan Gregorio and Andy Jao	Selina Dagdag	Carlo Pamintuan	Dominic Uy	Rizza Diaz
Game 2	Chuck Araneta	Ryan Gregorio and Yeng Guiao	Rizza Diaz	Carlo Pamintuan	Norman Black	Paolo del Rosario
Game 3	Charlie Cuna	Dominic Uy and Jason Webb	Apple David	Carlo Pamintuan	Yeng Guiao	Paolo del Rosario
Game 4	Sev Sarmenta	Ryan Gregorio and Andy Jao	Carla Lizardo	Carlo Pamintuan	Jason Webb	Rizza Diaz
Game 5	Magoo Marjon	Quinito Henson and Jason Webb	Rizza Diaz	Carlo Pamintuan	Alex Compton	Paolo del Rosario
Game 6	Charlie Cuna	Dominic Uy and Ryan Gregorio	Selina Dagdag	Carlo Pamintuan	Tony dela Cruz	Paolo del Rosario

- Additional Game 6 crew:
  - Trophy presentation: James Velasquez
  - Dugout celebration interviewer: Apple David
