= 2014 PBA Commissioner's Cup =

Second conference of the 2013–14 PBA season

- Duration: March 5 – May 15, 2014
- TV partner(s): Sports5; Local: TV5; International : AksyonTV International, Fox Sports

Finals
- Champions: San Mig Super Coffee Mixers
- Runners-up: Talk 'N Text Tropang Texters

Awards
- Best Player: Jayson Castro (Talk 'N Text Tropang Texters)
- Best Import: Richard Howell (Talk 'N Text Tropang Texters)
- Finals MVP: James Yap (San Mig Super Coffee Mixers)

PBA Commissioner's Cup chronology
- < 2013 2015 >

PBA conference chronology
- < 2013–14 Philippine 2014 Governors' >

The 2014 Philippine Basketball Association (PBA) Commissioner's Cup, also known as the 2014 PLDT Home TVolution-PBA Commissioner's Cup for sponsorship reasons, was the second conference of the 2013–14 PBA season. The tournament started on March 5, 2014, and finished on May 15, 2014. The tournament allows teams to hire foreign players or imports with a height limit of 6'11" for the bottom two of the last conference, and a limit of 6'9" for other teams.

== Format ==
The following format was observed for the duration of the conference:

- Single-round robin eliminations; 9 games per team; Teams are then seeded by basis on win–loss records.
- Top eight teams will advance to the quarterfinals. In case of tie, playoffs will be held only for the #2 and #8 seeds.
- Quarterfinals:
  - QF1: #1 seed vs #8 seed (#1 seed twice-to-beat)
  - QF2: #2 seed vs #7 seed (#2 seed twice-to-beat)
  - QF3: #3 seed vs #6 seed (best-of-3 series)
  - QF4: #4 seed vs #5 seed (best-of-3 series)
- Semifinals (best-of-5 series):
  - SF1: QF1 vs. QF4 winners
  - SF2: QF2 vs. QF3 winners
- Finals (best-of-5 series)
  - Winners of the semifinals

== Elimination round ==
=== Team standings ===
| Pos | Team | W | L | PCT | GB | Qualification |
|---|---|---|---|---|---|---|
| 1 | Talk 'N Text Tropang Texters | 9 | 0 | 1.000 | — | Twice-to-beat in the quarterfinals |
| 2 | San Miguel Beermen | 7 | 2 | .778 | 2 | Twice-to-beat in the quarterfinals |
| 3 | Alaska Aces | 6 | 3 | .667 | 3 | Best-of-three quarterfinals |
| 4 | Rain or Shine Elasto Painters | 5 | 4 | .556 (Note: Head-to-head record: Rain or Shine 1–0 Meralco) | 4 | Best-of-three quarterfinals |
| 5 | Meralco Bolts | 5 | 4 | .556 | 4 | Best-of-three quarterfinals |
| 6 | San Mig Super Coffee Mixers | 4 | 5 | .444 | 5 | Best-of-three quarterfinals |
| 7 | Air21 Express | 3 | 6 | .333 (Note: Head-to-head record: Air21 1–0 Barangay Ginebra) | 6 | Twice-to-win in the quarterfinals |
| 8 | Barangay Ginebra San Miguel | 3 | 6 | .333 | 6 | Twice-to-win in the quarterfinals |
| 9 | Barako Bull Energy | 2 | 7 | .222 | 7 | |
| 10 | GlobalPort Batang Pier | 1 | 8 | .111 | 8 | |

Source: PBA.ph

=== Schedule ===
| Team ╲ Game | 1 | 2 | 3 | 4 | 5 | 6 | 7 | 8 | 9 |
|---|---|---|---|---|---|---|---|---|---|
| Air21 | GP | TNT | BBE | ALA | MER | BGSM | SMSC | ROS | SMB |
| Alaska | TNT | GP | MER | ROS | A21 | SMB | BBE | BGSM | SMSC |
| Barako Bull | BGSM | ROS | A21 | TNT | SMB | SMSC | ALA | MER | GP |
| Barangay Ginebra | BBE | SMB | SMSC | GP | TNT | A21 | MER | ALA | ROS |
| GlobalPort | A21 | ALA | SMSC | MER | BGSM | SMB | ROS | TNT | BBE |
| Meralco | SMB | ALA | GP | TNT | A21 | ROS | BGSM | BBE | SMSC |
| Rain or Shine | BBE | ALA | SMB | SMSC | MER | GP | TNT | A21 | BGSM |
| San Miguel | MER | BGSM | TNT | ROS | BBE | GP | ALA | SMSC | A21 |
| San Mig Super Coffee | GP | BGSM | ROS | BBE | TNT | A21 | SMB | MER | ALA |
| Talk 'N Text | ALA | A21 | SMB | BBE | MER | BGSM | SMSC | ROS | GP |

= Win; = OT win; = Loss; = OT loss

=== Results ===
| Team | A21 | ALA | BBE | BGSM | GP | MER | ROS | SMB | SMSC | TNT |
|---|---|---|---|---|---|---|---|---|---|---|
| Air21 | | 78–88 | 103–85 | 97–95 | 83–78 | 98–109 | 82–87 | 85–93 | 84–97 | 91–95 |
| Alaska | — | | 78–71 | 83–73 | 93–77 | 76–85 | 78–92 | 89–78 | 85–66 | 72–85 |
| Barako Bull | — | — | | 104–108* | 96–98 | 98–105 | 110–106 | 100–106 | 92–90 | 96–101 |
| Barangay Ginebra | — | — | — | | 113–107 | 88–78 | 101–105* | 96–112 | 80–90 | 87–94 |
| GlobalPort | — | — | — | — | | 99–104 | 75–99 | 92–109 | 75–91 | 91–92 |
| Meralco | — | — | — | — | — | | 79–96 | 76–94 | 88–78 | 68–91 |
| Rain or Shine | — | — | — | — | — | — | | 107–112 | 74–91 | 82–85 |
| San Miguel | — | — | — | — | — | — | — | | 97–88 | 99–107 |
| San Mig Super Coffee | — | — | — | — | — | — | — | — | | 75–81 |
| Talk 'N Text | — | — | — | — | — | — | — | — | — | |

Legend: Blue = left column team win; Red = top row team win.
Matches with lighter background shading were decided after overtime.

== Bracket ==
Quarterfinals
(#1 twice-to-beat)
1 | Talk 'N Text | 97
8 | Barangay Ginebra | 84
(best-of-3)
4 | Rain or Shine | 2
5 | Meralco | 1
(#2 twice-to-beat)
2 | San Miguel | 79 | 95
7 | Air21 | 92 | 101**
(best-of-3)
3 | Alaska | 1
6 | San Mig Coffee | 2

Semifinals (best-of-5)
1 | Talk 'N Text | 3
4 | Rain or Shine | 0
7 | Air21 | 2
6 | San Mig Coffee | 3

Finals (best-of-5)
1 | Talk 'N Text | 1
6 | San Mig Coffee | 3

**double overtime

== Quarterfinals ==
=== (1) Talk 'N Text vs. (8) Barangay Ginebra ===
April 22

Talk 'N Text Tropang Texters 97, Barangay Ginebra San Miguel 84
Talk 'N Text wins series in one game

Smart Araneta Coliseum, Quezon City

=== (2) San Miguel vs. (7) Air21 ===
April 22

San Miguel Beermen 79, Air21 Express 92

Smart Araneta Coliseum, Quezon City

April 25

San Miguel Beermen 95, Air21 Express 101 (2OT)
Air21 wins series in two games

Smart Araneta Coliseum, Quezon City

=== (3) Alaska vs. (6) San Mig Super Coffee ===
April 21

Alaska Aces 86, San Mig Super Coffee Mixers 77

Smart Araneta Coliseum, Quezon City

April 23

Alaska Aces 65, San Mig Super Coffee Mixers 70

Smart Araneta Coliseum, Quezon City

April 26

Alaska Aces 65, San Mig Super Coffee Mixers 79
San Mig Super Coffee wins series, 2–1

Smart Araneta Coliseum, Quezon City

=== (4) Rain or Shine vs. (5) Meralco ===
April 21

Rain or Shine Elasto Painters 91, Meralco Bolts 94

Smart Araneta Coliseum, Quezon City

April 23

Rain or Shine Elasto Painters 102, Meralco Bolts 93

Smart Araneta Coliseum, Quezon City

April 26

Rain or Shine Elasto Painters 97, Meralco Bolts 96 (OT)
Rain or Shine wins series, 2–1

Smart Araneta Coliseum, Quezon City

== Semifinals ==
=== (1) Talk 'N Text vs. (4) Rain or Shine ===
April 28

Talk 'N Text Tropang Texters 91, Rain or Shine Elasto Painters 85

Smart Araneta Coliseum, Quezon City

April 30

Talk 'N Text Tropang Texters 94, Rain or Shine Elasto Painters 87

Cuneta Astrodome, Pasay

May 2

Talk 'N Text Tropang Texters 99, Rain or Shine Elasto Painters 91
Talk 'N Text wins series, 3–0

Smart Araneta Coliseum, Quezon City

=== (6) San Mig Super Coffee vs. (7) Air21 ===
April 29

San Mig Super Coffee Mixers 100, Air21 Express 103

Mall of Asia Arena, Pasay

May 1

San Mig Super Coffee Mixers 82, Air21 Express 75

Smart Araneta Coliseum, Quezon City

May 3

San Mig Super Coffee Mixers 84, Air21 Express 73

Smart Araneta Coliseum, Quezon City

May 5

San Mig Super Coffee Mixers 91, Air21 Express 94

Smart Araneta Coliseum, Quezon City

May 7

San Mig Super Coffee Mixers 99, Air21 Express 83
San Mig Super Coffee wins series, 3–2

Smart Araneta Coliseum, Quezon City

== Finals ==
May 9

Talk 'N Text Tropang Texters 80, San Mig Super Coffee Mixers 95

Smart Araneta Coliseum, Quezon City

May 11

Talk 'N Text Tropang Texters 86, San Mig Super Coffee Mixers 76

Smart Araneta Coliseum, Quezon City

May 13

Talk 'N Text Tropang Texters 75, San Mig Super Coffee Mixers 77

Smart Araneta Coliseum, Quezon City

May 15

Talk 'N Text Tropang Texters 91, San Mig Super Coffee Mixers 100
San Mig Super Coffee wins series, 3–1

PhilSports Arena, Pasig

== Awards ==
=== Conference ===
- Best Player of the Conference: Jayson Castro (Talk 'N Text Tropang Texters)
- Best Import of the Conference: Richard Howell (Talk 'N Text Tropang Texters)
- Finals MVP: James Yap (San Mig Super Coffee Mixers)

=== Players of the Week ===
| Week | Player | Ref. |
|---|---|---|
| March 5–9 | Jayson Castro (Talk 'N Text Tropang Texters) | |
| March 10–16 | Ian Sangalang (San Mig Super Coffee Mixers) | |
| March 17–23 | Ranidel de Ocampo (Talk 'N Text Tropang Texters) | |
| April 14–20 | Paul Lee (Rain or Shine Elasto Painters) | |
| April 21–27 | Asi Taulava (Air21 Express); Sean Anthony (Air21 Express) | |
| April 28 – May 4 | Ryan Reyes (Talk 'N Text Tropang Texters) | |

== Imports ==
The following is the list of imports, which had played for their respective teams at least once, with the returning imports in italics. Highlighted are the imports who stayed with their respective teams for the whole conference.

| Team | Name | Debuted | Last game | Record |
|---|---|---|---|---|
| Air21 Express | Hervé Lamizana | March 5 (vs. GlobalPort) | March 17 (vs. Alaska) | 2–2 |
| Air21 Express | Wesley Witherspoon | March 23 (vs. Meralco) | May 7 (vs. San Mig Super Coffee) | 5–7 |
| Alaska Aces | Robert Dozier | March 5 (vs. Talk 'N Text) | April 26 (vs. San Mig Super Coffee) | 7–5 |
| Barako Bull Energy | Josh Dollard | March 7 (vs. Barangay Ginebra) | April 13 (vs. GlobalPort) | 2–7 |
| Barangay Ginebra San Miguel | Leon Rodgers | March 7 (vs. Barako Bull) | March 26 (vs. Air21) | 2–4 |
| Barangay Ginebra San Miguel | Josh Powell | April 2 (vs. Meralco) | April 13 (vs. Alaska) | 1–1 |
| Barangay Ginebra San Miguel | Gabe Freeman | April 20 (vs. Rain or Shine) | April 22 (vs. Talk 'N Text) | 0–2 |
| GlobalPort Batang Pier | Evan Brock | March 5 (vs. Air21) | April 13 (vs. Barako Bull) | 1–8 |
| Meralco Bolts | Brian Butch | March 7 (vs. San Miguel) | March 26 (vs. Rain or Shine) | 3–3 |
| Meralco Bolts | Darnell Jackson | April 2 (vs. Barangay Ginebra) | April 26 (vs. Rain or Shine) | 3–3 |
| Rain or Shine Elasto Painters | Alexander McLean | March 9 (vs. Barako Bull) | March 26 (vs. Meralco) | 2–3 |
| Rain or Shine Elasto Painters | Wayne Chism | March 31 (vs. GlobalPort) | May 2 (vs. Talk 'N Text) | 5–5 |
| San Mig Super Coffee Mixers | James Mays | March 12 (vs. GlobalPort) | May 15 (vs. Talk 'N Text) | 12–7 |
| San Mig Super Coffee Mixers | No Import | April 14 (vs. Meralco) | | 0–2 |
| San Miguel Beermen | Josh Boone | March 7 (vs. Meralco) | March 9 (vs. Barangay Ginebra) | 2–0 |
| San Miguel Beermen | Kevin Jones | March 14 (vs. Talk 'N Text) | April 25 (vs. Air21) | 5–4 |
| Talk 'N Text Tropang Texters | Richard Howell | March 5 (vs. Alaska) | May 15 (vs. San Mig Super Coffee) | 13–3 |
| Talk 'N Text Tropang Texters | No Import | April 11 (vs. GlobalPort) | | 1–0 |
