= Richard Howell (basketball) =

American basketball player and coach (born 1990)

Richard Howell ריצ'רד האוול
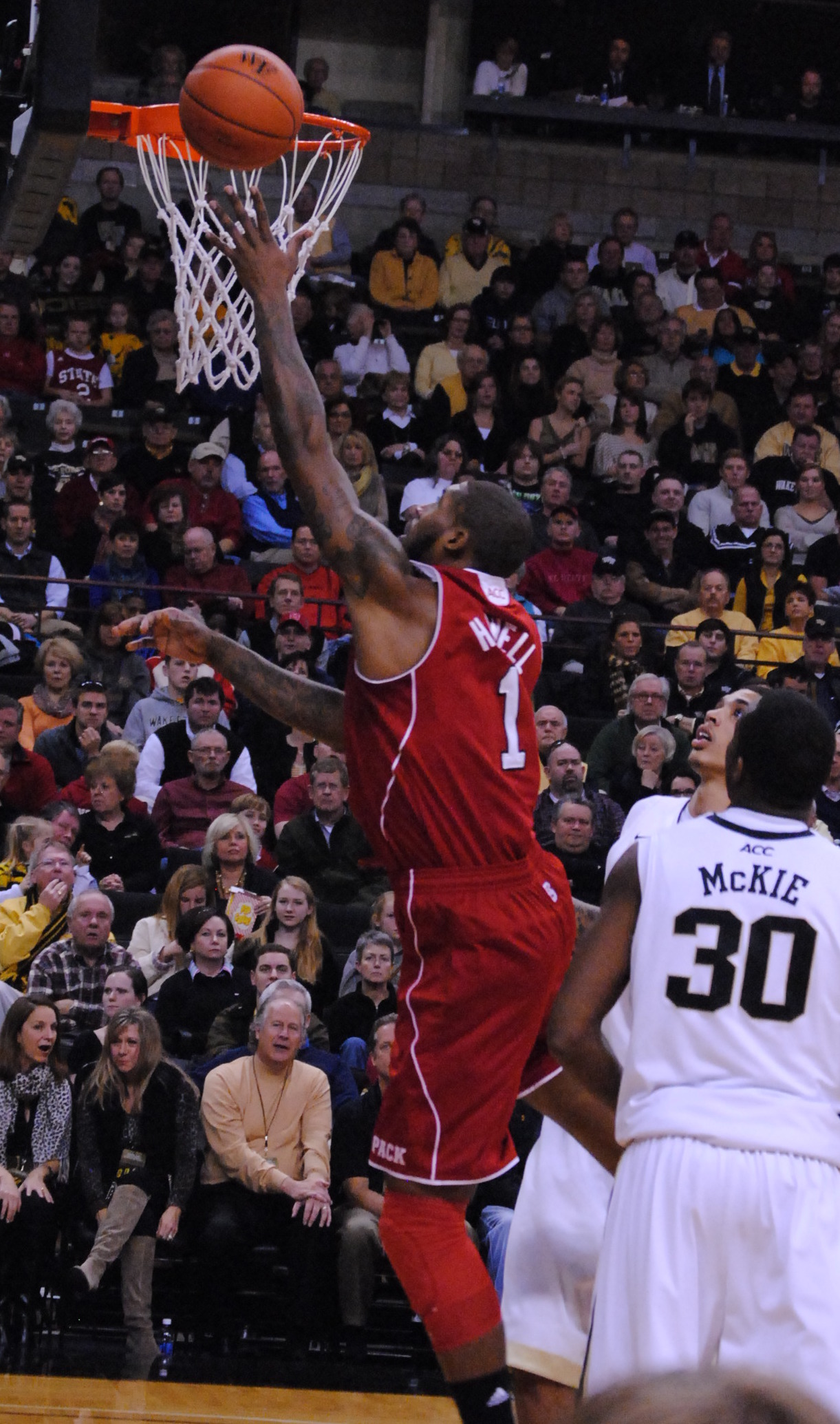
- Howell (shooting) with NC State in January 2012

Personal information
- Born: September 26, 1990 (age 36) Marietta, Georgia, U.S.
- Listed height: 6 ft 8 in (2.03 m)
- Listed weight: 255 lb (116 kg)

Career information
- High school: Wheeler (Marietta, Georgia)
- College: NC State (2009–2013)
- NBA draft: 2013: undrafted
- Playing career: 2013–2023
- Position: Power forward / center
- Coaching career: 2024–present

Career history

Playing
- 2013–2014: Idaho Stampede
- 2014: Talk 'N Text Tropang Texters
- 2014: Juvecaserta Basket
- 2015: Talk 'N Text Tropang Texters
- 2015: Austin Spurs
- 2015: Leones de Santo Domingo
- 2015–2016: Ironi Nahariya
- 2016–2017: Hapoel Tel Aviv
- 2017–2018: Hapoel Jerusalem
- 2018–2019: Hapoel Tel Aviv
- 2019: Phoenix Pulse Fuel Masters
- 2019–2021: Hapoel Holon
- 2022: Hapoel Haifa
- 2023: Maccabi Haifa

Coaching
- 2024–present: Green Hope High School

Career highlights
- Israeli League champion (2017); Israeli League All-Star (2018); Commissioner's Cup Best Import (2014); First-team All-ACC (2013)
- Stats at Basketball Reference

Richard Howell (Hebrew: ריצ'רד האוול; born September 26, 1990) is an American-Israeli basketball coach and former professional player who is the current head coach of the Green Hope High School boys varsity basketball team. He played college basketball for the NC State Wolfpack.

== High school career ==
Howell attended Joseph Wheeler High School in Marietta, Georgia. As a senior, he averaged 16.5 points per game as he went on to be selected to the Georgia 5A All-State first team. He played AAU basketball for the Worldwide Renegades alongside his future teammate at N.C. State, Lorenzo Brown. Coming out of high school, Howell was rated by Scout.com as the 16th best power forward in the nation.

== College career ==
In his freshman season at North Carolina State, Howell missed the first five games of the season due to a knee injury sustained during pre-season. In 30 games, he averaged 4.9 points and 4.6 rebounds in 13.6 minutes per game.

In his sophomore season, he finished fifth in the ACC in offensive rebounds, pulling down 2.8 per game. In 30 games, he averaged 7.4 points and 6.5 rebounds in 18.2 minutes per game.

In his junior season, he finished third in the ACC in rebounding. In 37 games, he averaged 10.8 points, 9.2 rebounds, 1.1 assists and 1.0 steals in 27.0 minutes per game.

In his senior season, he was named to the All-ACC first team. In 35 games, he averaged 12.7 points, 10.9 rebounds, 1.7 assists and 1.0 steals in 31.6 minutes per game. He was regarded as a very important member of the 2012–13 Wolfpack.

=== College statistics ===
| Year | Team | GP | GS | MPG | FG% | 3P% | FT% | RPG | APG | SPG | BPG | PPG |
|---|---|---|---|---|---|---|---|---|---|---|---|---|
| 2009–10 | NC State | 30 | 1 | 13.6 | .460 | .182 | .574 | 4.6 | .6 | .4 | .2 | 4.9 |
| 2010–11 | NC State | 30 | 8 | 18.2 | .518 | .400 | .648 | 6.5 | .9 | .8 | .5 | 7.4 |
| 2011–12 | NC State | 37 | 37 | 27.0 | .489 | .000 | .636 | 9.2 | 1.1 | 1.0 | .3 | 10.8 |
| 2012–13 | NC State | 35 | 35 | 31.6 | .570 | .000 | .648 | 10.9 | 1.7 | 1.0 | .9 | 12.7 |
| Career | | 132 | 81 | 23.2 | .518 | .222 | .633 | 8.0 | 1.1 | .8 | .5 | 9.2 |

== Professional career ==
=== NBA and D-League (2013–2014) ===
After going undrafted in the 2013 NBA draft, Howell joined the Denver Nuggets for the 2013 NBA Summer League, and had a short stint with French club BCM Gravelines.

On September 13, 2013, Howell signed with the Portland Trail Blazers. However, he was later waived by the Trail Blazers on October 22 after appearing in one preseason game. On November 1, 2013, he was acquired by the Idaho Stampede of the NBA Development League as an affiliate player of the Trail Blazers. On January 29, 2014, he was waived by the Stampede. In 20 games for the Stampede, he averaged 18.0 points, 10.6 rebounds, 2.6 assists and 1.4 steals per game.

=== Philippines and Italy (2014–2015) ===
On January 30, 2014, Howell signed with the Talk 'N Text Tropang Texters as an import for the 2014 PBA Commissioner's Cup. In his first game for the Texters, Howell recorded a career-high 30 rebounds, surpassing his previous record of 20, in an 85–72 victory over the Alaska Aces. In 15 games for the Texters, he averaged 19.6 points, 18.5 rebounds, 1.7 assists and 1.5 steals per game.

On July 30, 2014, Howell signed with Juvecaserta Basket of Italy for the 2014–15 season. On November 20, 2014, he was released by Juvecaserta after appearing in just four games.

On January 13, 2015, Howell re-signed with the Talk 'N Text Tropang Texters for the 2015 PBA Commissioner's Cup. However, on February 18, he was released by the club despite leading his team to a 4–1 record through five games. In five games, he averaged 15.8 points, 15.4 rebounds, 3.0 assists and 1.6 steals per game.

=== Return to D-League (2015) ===
On March 6, 2015, Howell was acquired by the Austin Spurs of the NBA Development League. In eight games for the Spurs, he averaged 8.8 points, 4.9 rebounds, 1.0 assists and 1.0 steals per game.

=== Dominican Republic (2015) ===
On June 19, 2015, Howell signed with Leones de Santo Domingo for the rest of the 2015 LNB season. In six games for Leones, he averaged 11.7 points, 7.5 rebounds and 2.0 assists per game.

=== Israel (2015–2019) ===
==== Ironi Nahariya (2015–2016) ====
On August 11, 2015, Howell signed with Ironi Nahariya of the Israeli Basketball Premier League. On January 24, 2016, Howell recorded a season-high 27 points, shooting 12-of-17 from the field, along with eight rebounds in a 94–87 win over Bnei Herzliya. He was subsequently named Israeli League Round 17 MVP. Howell helped Nahariya reach the 2016 Israeli League Playoffs, where they eventually lost Hapoel Eilat. In 34 games played during the 2015–16 season, Howell averaged 15.1 points, 9.9 rebounds, 1.7 assists and 1.5 steals per game.

==== Hapoel Tel Aviv (2016–2017) ====
On July 21, 2016, Howell agreed terms with Maccabi Tel Aviv, but eventually the deal fell through. One week later, Howell signed a two-year deal with Hapoel Tel Aviv. On December 1, 2016, Howell was named Israeli League Player of the Month for games played in November.

==== Hapoel Jerusalem (2017–2018) ====
On April 13, 2017, Howell parted ways with Hapoel Tel Aviv and joined Hapoel Jerusalem, signing a one-year deal. He helped lead Jerusalem to the 2017 Israeli League championship.

On May 27, 2018, Howell recorded 22 points, shooting 11-of-13 from the field, along with six rebounds and two steals in a 99–80 win over Ironi Nes Ziona. He was subsequently named Israeli League Round 33 MVP. On June 3, 2018, Howell recorded a season-high 24 points, shooting 8-of-12 from the field, along with nine rebounds, two assists and four steals in a 107–105 playoff win over Hapoel Gilboa Galil. Howell helped Jerusalem reach the 2018 Israeli League Final Four, where they eventually lost to Hapoel Holon.

In September 2018, Howell was suspended by the Israeli anti-doping agency for three months after he tested positive to Cannabis use during the Israeli League playoffs.

==== Return to Hapoel Tel Aviv (2018–2019) ====
On November 10, 2018, Howell returned to Hapoel Tel Aviv for a second stint, signing a one-year deal. On November 25, 2018, Howell recorded a double-double with a season-high 22 points and 10 rebounds in his second game with Hapoel, shooting 9-of-15 from the field, to go with five assists in a 90–78 win over Ironi Nes Ziona. In 26 games played for Hapoel, he averaged 12.6 points, 6.8 rebounds, 2.9 assists and 1.1 steals per game. Howell helped the team reach the 2019 Israeli League Playoffs, where they eventually were eliminated by Maccabi Tel Aviv in the Quarterfinals.

=== Return to the Philippines (2019) ===
In June 2019, Howell signed with the Phoenix Pulse Fuel Masters of the Philippine Basketball Association as a replacement for Robert Dozier as the team's import for the 2019 PBA Commissioner's Cup. In 9 games played for the Fuel Masters, he averaged 22.7 points, 16.6 rebounds and 2.7 assists per game

=== Return to Israel (2019–2023) ===
On October 20, 2019, Howell signed with Hapoel Holon. He averaged 8.0 points and 5.6 rebounds per game during the 2019–20 season. He returned to Hapoel Holon for the 2020–21 season, but injury saw him miss most of the season.

In October 2022, Howell signed with Hapoel Haifa. He played one game before leaving the team. In January 2023, he joined Maccabi Haifa of the Liga Leumit.

== National team career ==
On April 6, 2017, Howell received an Israeli passport. In September 2017, Howell made his debut for the Israeli national team at EuroBasket 2017 tournament, where he averaged 17.8 points, 5.8 rebounds and 3.2 steals per game.

== Coaching career ==
In April 2024, Howell was named head coach of the Green Hope High School boys varsity basketball team.

== See also ==
- List of All-Atlantic Coast Conference men's basketball teams
