= Diamon Simpson =

American basketball player

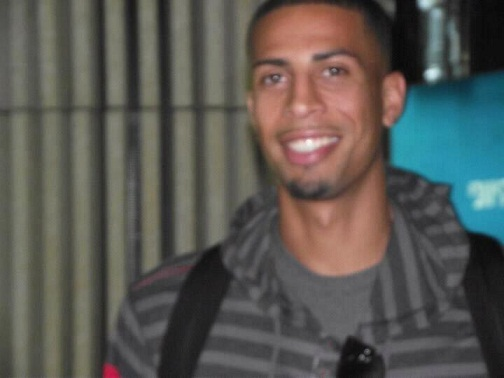
- Simpson in Israel, 2012

Capital City Go-Go
- Title: Assistant coach
- League: NBA G League

Personal information
- Born: September 8, 1987 (age 39) Los Angeles County, California, U.S.
- Listed height: 6 ft 8 in (2.03 m)
- Listed weight: 228 lb (103 kg)

Career information
- High school: Hayward (Hayward, California)
- College: Saint Mary's (2005–2009)
- NBA draft: 2009: undrafted
- Playing career: 2009–2024
- Position: Power forward

Career history

Playing
- 2009–2010: Los Angeles D-Fenders
- 2010: Alaska Aces
- 2010–2011: Türk Telekom
- 2011–2012: Adelaide 36ers
- 2012–2013: Maccabi Ashdod
- 2013–2014: Ironi Nes Ziona
- 2014–2015: Estudiantes
- 2015–2016: Ironi Nes Ziona
- 2016: Estudiantes
- 2016–2017: Nymburk
- 2017: Maccabi Tel Aviv
- 2017: Trotamundos de Carabobo
- 2017–2018: Büyükçekmece
- 2018: Alaska Aces
- 2018–2019: Maccabi Rishon LeZion
- 2019: Alaska Aces
- 2020: Ironi Nahariya
- 2020–2021: Quimsa
- 2021: Plateros de Fresnillo
- 2021–2022: Maccabi Rishon LeZion
- 2022: Dorados de Chihuahua
- 2022-2023: Riachuelo de la Rioja
- 2023–2024: Peñarol Mar del Plata

Coaching
- 2024–present: Capital City Go-Go (assistant)

Career highlights
- PBA champion (2010 Fiesta); 3× First-team All-WCC (2007–2009)
- Stats at NBA.com
- Stats at Basketball Reference

Diamon Simpson (born September 8, 1987) is an American former professional basketball player working as an assistant coach for the Capital City Go-Go of the NBA G League. He played college basketball for the Saint Mary's Gaels.

== Early life ==
Born in Los Angeles County, California, Simpson grew up in the San Francisco Bay Area city of Hayward, and graduated from Hayward High School in 2005.

== College ==
Simpson attended the Saint Mary's College of California and played for the Saint Mary's Gaels in the NCAA's West Coast Conference (WCC) between 2005 and when he graduated in 2009. He was a teammate of Australian and Portland Trail Blazers backup point guard Patrick Mills when playing for the Gaels from 2007 to 2009.

Over his 4 seasons with the Gaels the 6-foot-7-inch (201 cm) Simpson played 128 games averaging 12.5 points, 8.8 rebounds and 1.9 blocks per game. His career field goal percentage of 50.6% is currently 23rd on the all-time list for the WCC while his 1130 rebounds a Gaels record and all time 2nd in the WCC and 20th in the NCAA.

Simpson is the Saint Mary's Gaels all-time leading rebounder (1130), shot blocker (239), he leads in steals (174) and free throws made and attempted (470/777 at 60.5%).

== Professional career ==
=== NBA D-League (2009–2010) ===
After graduating from Saint Mary's, Simpson started 2009 by attending the Golden State Warriors training camp but was unable to secure a spot on the Warriors roster. From there he signed to play for the Los Angeles D-Fenders of the NBA D-League in 2009–10 where he averaged 15.5 points, 9.6 rebounds and 1.4 blocks in his 30 games.

=== Philippines (2010) ===
Simpson was bought out of his D-Fenders contract by the Alaska Aces of the Philippine Basketball Association (PBA) for the 2010 Fiesta Conference (despite a league rule that import players must be no taller than 198 cm). In his opening game for the Aces, he scored an impressive 36 points and grabbed 25 rebounds. By season's end, he was averaging around 25 points and 16 rebounds a game in a dominant display which made him a favorite of the Aces supporters. Despite not winning the Best Import award, he was able to lead the Aces in winning the championship over 18-time champions San Miguel Beermen which had returning import Gabe Freeman as well as Dondon Hontiveros and Arwind Santos for the locals.

=== Turkey (2010–2011) ===
After leaving the Aces Simpson signed with Turkish Basketball League team Türk Telekom for part of the 2010–11 Turkish season where he averaged just 7.3 points and 5.8 rebounds and 0.3 blocks per game in four games primarily playing at small forward.

=== Australia (2011–2012) ===
Simpson signed for the Adelaide 36ers after original import John Williamson was ruled out with a knee injury. Simpson joined the 36ers for Round 3 of the 2011-12 NBL season. Throughout the season, he averaged 14.3 points, 8.6 rebounds and 1.5 blocks in 27 games. He also posted 12 double-doubles and had five 20-point performances with Adelaide and is widely considered to be easily the best performed of the imports for the 36ers during an era where the club claimed 3 wooden spoons in 4 seasons.

=== National Basketball Association (2012) ===
On April 13, 2012, Simpson signed with the Houston Rockets of the NBA for the remainder of the 2011–12 season. He was waived by the Rockets on September 7, 2012, without making an appearance for them.

=== Spain (2016–17) ===
On March 1, 2016, Simpson signed with CB Estudiantes of the Spanish Liga ACB.

=== Israel and Russia (2017-18) ===
On March 1, 2017, Simpson signed a one-month contract with Maccabi Tel Aviv. On April 7, 2017, he was parted ways with Maccabi after appearing in six Euroleague games.

On August 26, 2018, Simpson signed with the Russian team Avtodor Saratov for the 2018–19 season. However, on October 2, 2018, Saratov parted ways with Simpson due to a back injury before appearing in any game for them.

On December 22, 2018, Simpson returned to Israel for a fourth stint, signing with Maccabi Rishon LeZion for the rest of the season. On June 10, 2019, Simpson recorded season-highs of 28 point and 20 rebounds, shooting 12-of-17 from the field, leading Rishon LeZion to the Israeli League Final after a 92–86 win over Hapoel Jerusalem.

=== Alaska (2019) ===
On June 27, 2019, Simpson returned to the Alaska Aces for a third stint, signing for the 2019 PBA Commissioner's Cup.

=== Israel (2020-present) ===
On January 7, 2020, Simpson signed with Ironi Nahariya for the rest of the season, replacing Jeff Adrien. He subsequently joined Quimsa of the Argentine Liga Nacional de Basquetbol, averaging 11.3 points and 7.9 rebounds per game. In 2021, Simpson signed with Plateros de Fresnillo of the Liga Nacional de Baloncesto Profesional and averaged 9.8 points and 7.5 rebounds per game.

On November 30, 2021, he signed with Maccabi Rishon LeZion.

== The Basketball Tournament ==
Simpson played for Team Gael Force in the 2018 edition of The Basketball Tournament. Team Gael Force made it to the Super 16 before falling to eventual tournament runner-up Eberlein Drive.

== Professional career ==
On October 16, 2024, Simpson was hired as an assistant coach by the Capital City Go-Go.

== Career statistics ==
Legend
GP	Games played	GS	Games started	MPG	Minutes per game
FG%	Field-goal percentage	3P%	3-point field-goal percentage	FT%	Free-throw percentage
RPG	Rebounds per game	APG	Assists per game	SPG	Steals per game
BPG	Blocks per game	PPG	Points per game	PIR	Performance index rating
**Bold**	Career high

=== EuroLeague ===
Year	Team	GP	GS	MPG	FG%	3P%	FT%	RPG	APG	SPG	BPG	PPG	PIR
2016–17	Maccabi	6	2	20.1	.610	0	.333	6.7	1.2	1.5	1	9.2	15.2
Career		6	2	20.1	.610	0	.333	6.7	1.2	1.5	1	9.2	15.2
