= Janine Nicandro =

Filipino basketball referee

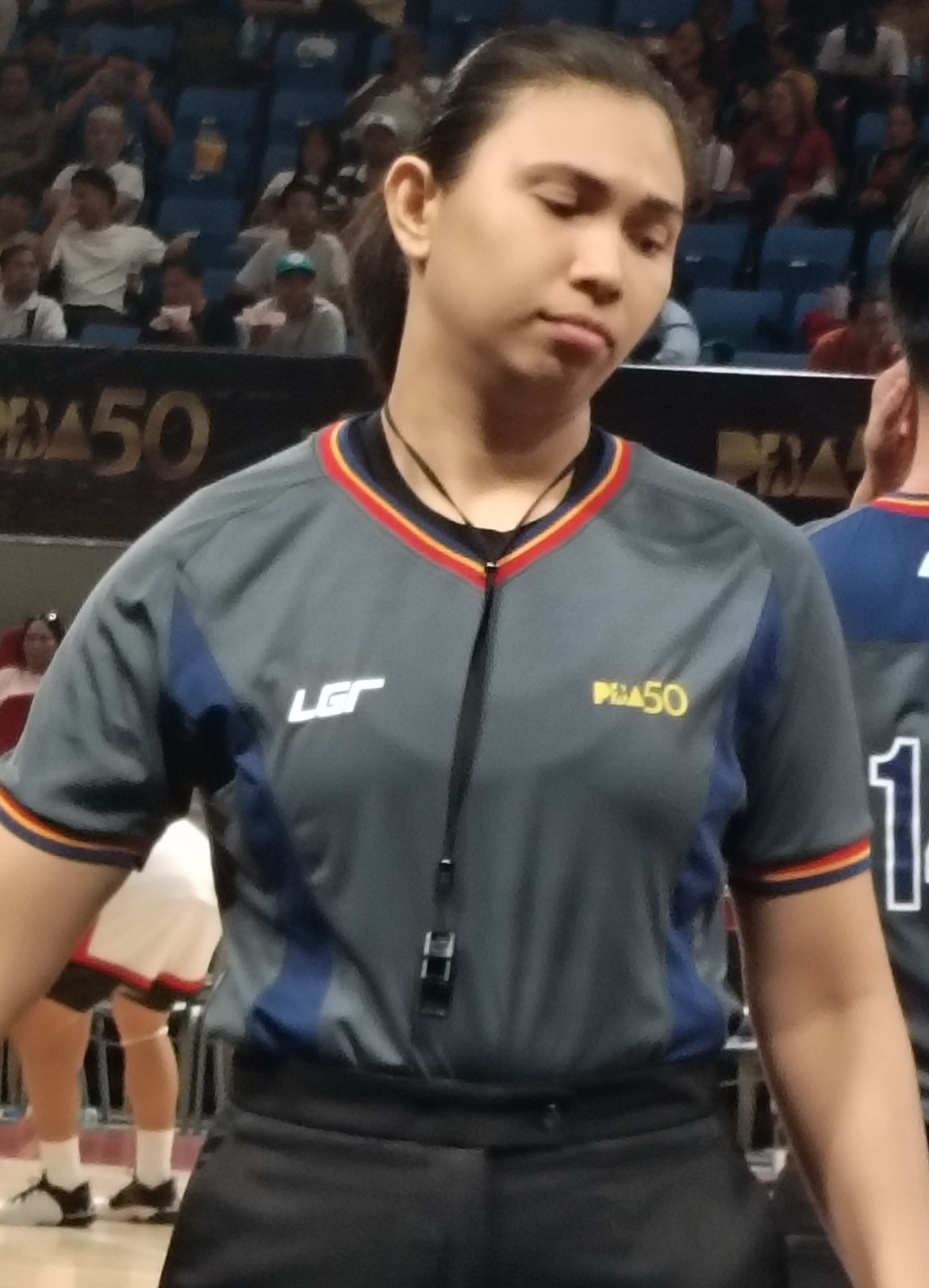
- Nicandro in 2025
- Born: October 15, 1992 (age 33); Santa Cruz, Laguna, Philippines
- Education: Laguna State Polytechnic University

Janine Nicandro (born 15 October 1992) is a Filipino basketball referee and former collegiate basketball player who officiates games at the Philippine Basketball Association. Nicandro became the first female referee to officiate in the league when she participated as one of the four match officials at the 2016 PBA Governors' Cup match between Meralco Bolts and Phoenix Fuel Masters which ended 108–103 in favor of the Bolts.

== Early life and education ==
Nicandro was born in Santa Cruz, Laguna, but grew on the town of Pagsanjan in the same province. She at first was not involved that much in basketball having played for the volleyball teams of her elementary and high school in Laguna. She also followed the Shakey's V-League.

Nicandro entered the Laguna State Polytechnic University for her collegiate studies where she tried out for both the university's basketball and volleyball teams. She was accepted to play for the university's basketball team, the LSPU Lakers, as a center. She also played for four years as part of the university's basketball team. She finished her studies in 2014 and obtained a bachelor's degree in Entrepreneurship.

== Career ==
Graduating from college, Nicandro planned to obtained corporate experience before setting up her own business. She then became employed in a LPG company but out of boredom turned to refereeing.

Celso Rivera, a former referee at the Philippine Basketball Association (PBA), encouraged her to take up a career in refereeing. The referee first officiated in the PBA Developmental League and underwent further training in the women 3x3 tournament, and the league's campus tour. Nicandro was picked as one of the 15 trainees of the PBA referee academy, five of which were women. She and Edith Boticario were among those picked by the PBA to officiate games at the 2016 PBA Governors' Cup. Nicandro officiated in the PBA D-League for three years.

Although Nicandro was not the only sole woman picked to officiate during the conference, she became the first woman referee to officiate games in the professional league when she debuted as one of the four officials at the Meralco Bolts–Phoenix Fuel Masters match held on July 15, 2016.
