= TV5 Network coverage of the PBA =

Branding used for PBA telecasts on One Sports in the Philippines

- Also known as: PBA on AKTV (2011–13); PBA on Sports5 (2013–17); PBA on ESPN5 (2017–20)
- Genre: PBA game telecast
- Developed by: One Sports/Cignal TV
- Starring: various commentators
- Country of origin: Philippines
- Original languages: Tagalog; English

Production
- Camera setup: Multiple-camera setup
- Running time: varies

Original release
- Network: One Sports (see broadcast history for details)
- Release: October 2, 2011 – present

Related
- PBA on Solar Sports; PBA on Vintage Sports; PBA on Viva TV; PBA on IBC; PBA on ABC/TV5

Television broadcasts of the Philippine Basketball Association (PBA) have been produced by One Sports (formerly Sports5 and ESPN5), the sports division of TV5 Network Inc., since the 2011–12 season. TV5, formerly known as Associated Broadcasting Company (ABC), previously handled the coverage of the games from 2004 to 2008.

As part of a blocktime agreement between TV5 and the Intercontinental Broadcasting Corporation (IBC), PBA games were aired on IBC's AKTV block, under the branding PBA sa AKTV (lit. 'PBA on AKTV'). After AKTV shutdown in May 2013, IBC extended their broadcast through the 2013 PBA Governors' Cup. From 2013 to 2015, TV5 and AksyonTV simultaneously aired the games, with Fox Sports Asia airing with English-language commentary. PBA Rush was added in 2016 for English-language broadcasts.

In 2023, broadcasts were moved to A2Z, at which point One Sports revived the Sports5 branding for PBA broadcasts. Games also aired on CNN Philippines in January 2024, and were carried over to RPTV the following month after CNN Philippines shut down. Currently, games are also streaming through the streamer Cignal Play and One Sports Youtube channel continued to stream all games.

== History ==
=== AKTV (2011–2013) ===
PBA on AKTV logo used from October 2011 to August 2012

From October 2011 to May 2013, the coverage was known as PBA sa AKTV (lit. transl. PBA on AKTV). The games were broadcast on Sports5's AKTV program block on IBC. This was the third time that the PBA aired on IBC. The first was from 1996 to 2002 when Vintage Sports and later Viva Sports handled the television coverage, and the second in 2003, when IBC became one of the two networks (the other being NBN) that covered the PBA.

Games are being broadcast live and a pre-game and post-game show entitled AKTV Center was added.

=== Move to TV5 (2013–2014) ===
After TV5 decided not to renew their blocktime agreement with IBC upon its expiration by May 2013 due to high blocktime costs and poor ratings, the broadcast coverage of the 2013 PBA Commissioner's Cup Finals was temporarily transferred to TV5 with simulcasts with AksyonTV, an all-Filipino news and public affairs channel of TV5.

Sports5 proposed to move the coverage of the PBA games to their sister channel AksyonTV starting with the 2013 PBA Governors' Cup. The league however rejected this move since the contract between them and Sports5 states the league should be aired on a VHF channel. Sports5 then offered to air the second game of a doubleheader playdate on their main TV network TV5, one hour after the first game finishes, with the first game to be aired on a delayed basis after the second game (similar on what Vintage Sports did to the coverage of the PBA Games from 1982 to 1986). However, both games will be aired live on AksyonTV. This proposal was denied by the PBA Board of Governors since this violates the terms of their contract with Sports5.

The broadcast of the games returned to IBC for the duration of the 2013 PBA Governors' Cup (up to the semifinal round) as a compromise after the PBA disagreed to Sports5's request to permanently transfer the coverage to TV5 and/or Aksyon TV. The finals series for Governors' Cup were aired live on TV5.

In November 2013, Sports5 and Fox Sports Asia have entered in an agreement to air the Wednesday PBA games for the 2013–14 season live on the cable channel. It will have its own English speaking broadcast panel to properly cater the cable channel's audience.

For the 2013-14 Philippine Cup eliminations, the games were aired on the following schedule:

| Game day | TV5 | AksyonTV | Fox Sports Asia (Wednesdays only) |
|---|---|---|---|
| Weekdays | First Game: Delayed (11PM); Second Game: Live: (8PM) | First Game: Live (5:30PM); Second Game: Live: (8PM) | First Game: Live (5:30PM); Second Game: Live: (8PM) |
| Saturdays | First Game: Live (3:30PM); Second Game: n/a | First Game: Live (3:30PM); Second Game: Live: (5:30PM) | none |
| Sundays | First Game: Live (3:00PM); Second Game: Live: (5:30PM) | First Game: Live (3:00PM); Second Game: Live: (5:30PM) | none |

The schedule for the 2014 PBA Commissioner's Cup has been slightly altered starting March 17, 2014, having the Saturday doubleheader games being aired live on TV5, with a lone game scheduled during Mondays and Wednesdays, to maximize TV5's weekday schedule. As a result, the simulcast at AksyonTV was discontinued. The weekday live airing of the games was returned on starting March 26 after several PBA fans reacted negatively about the delayed airing of the first game. The following schedule was also applied for the 2014 PBA Governors' Cup.

| Game day | TV5 | AksyonTV | Fox Sports Asia (Wednesdays only) |
|---|---|---|---|
| Weekdays | First Game: Delayed (11PM); Second Game: Live: (8PM) | First Game: Live (5:30PM); Second Game: n/a | First Game: Live (5:30PM); Second Game: Live: (8PM) |
| Saturdays | First Game: Live (2:45PM); Second Game: Live: (5:15PM) | none | none |
| Sundays | First Game: Live (3:00PM); Second Game: Live: (5:15PM) | none | none |

=== Sports5 (2014–2020) ===
Beginning with the 2014–15 Philippine Cup, all games will be broadcast live on TV5 with simulcasts on AksyonTV and game days (all double headers) will be on Tuesdays, Wednesdays, Fridays and Sundays. Provincial games will be held during Saturdays which is the only single header game day. The coverage is also live-streamed via sports5.ph, where pre-game and post-game analysis are also featured. The radio coverage was also transferred to TV5's FM radio network Radyo5 from the previous DZSR AM network.

The same schedule is also being followed during the 2015–16 season, except that the AksyonTV simulcast was discontinued. When Sports5 got the exclusive airing rights of UFC, they re-activated the previously dormant Hyper HD channel and began simulcasting the PBA games in HD starting in January 2016.

To further utilize the simulcast setup of Sports5, they have assigned a different broadcast panel for TV5 and Hyper/Cignal. TV5 have the Taglish commentary while Hyper/Cignal have English language commentary.

A separate channel was assigned for PBA broadcasts beginning July 15, 2016, named "PBA Rush". The said channel also features game replays and specials.

In October 2016, TV5 President and CEO Chot Reyes told the media that the league renewed its contract with Sports5 for three more seasons.

As Sports5 inked a partnership with global sports media network ESPN on October 12, the broadcast coverage of the PBA games were carried over by the new ESPN5, and the new service was soft-launched on Game 1 of the 2017 PBA Governors' Cup Finals on October 13.

=== One Sports (2020–present) ===
The program was rebranded as "PBA on One Sports" on March 8, 2020, to reflect the changes in TV5's sports division. Since the 2023–24 season, TV5 has partnered up with multiple networks to broadcast the PBA games.

TV5 President Guido Zaballero stated that the channel began shifting its focus on entertainment programs, news programs and movie programming. In October 2023, PBA entered into an acquired agreement with ZOE Broadcasting Network and ABS-CBN Corporation to broadcast the league's games on A2Z, with all ABS-CBN programs being temporarily affected by the changes in programming during game days. The PBA games still airs on Cignal TV's PBA Rush through Pilipinas Live! streaming service. On February 12, 2024, Tiebreaker Times reported that A2Z canceled the broadcasting of PBA games.

In December 2023, TV5 Network Inc. entered into an acquired agreement with Nine Media Corporation to broadcast the PBA games on CNN Philippines every Saturday and Sunday from January 6, 2024. Following the shutdown of CNN Philippines on January 31, 2024, the broadcast of the games was carried over to the replacement channel RPTV, beginning with the 2023–24 PBA Commissioner's Cup Finals, and were extended to weekdays.

=== High-definition broadcast ===
Sports5 had its first high-definition broadcast of the league's games during the finals series of the 2014 PBA Commissioner's Cup. It was aired exclusively to Cignal Digital TV subscribers through a pay per view assigned channel for free. Since then, the HD broadcast has been airing for free on Cignal except during the 2015 Commissioner's and Governors' Cups, which became pay-per-view exclusive. On January 8, 2016, the HD broadcast has been airing on Hyper HD. The HD broadcast was later transferred to the league's exclusive channel in Cignal upon launching of "PBA Rush" in July 2016.

The TV5 feed became available also in HD upon launching of TV5's HD channel on Cignal starting April 1, 2023, in turn making the PBA games air in HD.

=== On-demand ===
One Sports uploads the highlights of all PBA games on the One Sports' YouTube channel. From 2021 to 2023, select games are being livestreamed through the Puso Pilipinas and Smart Sports Facebook pages.

Beginning with the 2023–24 season, the PBA games will be livestreamed via Pilipinas Live streaming service. Games from the 2020 season up to present are available for on-demand viewing.

Since the 2025 PBA Philippine Cup, PBA games are also livestreamed simulcast on One Sports' YouTube channel via Pilipinas Live feed.

== Music ==
For the duration of the 2011-12 Philippine Cup Eliminations, "Showdown" by the Black Eyed Peas was used as AKTV's main theme music for the PBA games in addition to the generic sports theme used during halftime and interview segments. A different sports theme music was used starting from the semifinal round of the Philippine Cup. This was still used up to the finals of the 2012 Governors Cup.

For the 2012–13 PBA season, a theme music entitled "Kampihan na!" was used on their on-air presentation. During the Philippine Cup, AKTV used a version of this theme without vocals. The vocals were later added during the elimination round of the Commissioner's Cup and was used until the Governors' Cup. A different theme was introduced during the quarterfinal and semifinal rounds of the Commissioner's Cup entitled "Tuloy ang Laban", which was also used sporadically during the Governors' Cup.

A remixed version of the "Kampihan na!" theme was used for the 2013–14 season. The remixed theme was used during the Philippine Cup, however a different background music was used for the Commissioner's and Governors' Cups.

During the 2014–15 season, "Ito ang Liga" which was composed by Jungee Marcelo and Thyro Alfaro and interpreted by Ebe Dancel, Sam Concepcion and rapper Gloc-9 is used as the main theme of the league's 40th season. An instrumental version, as well as a different rendition of the song, is used as bed (background music) and on the opening billboard during the coverage.

A new theme entitled "Liga ng mga Bida" performed by Abra and Aya of Project Pilipinas, was introduced for the 2015–16 season. It is used as the background and OBB music of the coverage. Generic background music was also used for the 2016 Commissioner's and Governors' Cup and also used during the 2016–17 Philippine Cup.

For the 2017 Commissioner's Cup, a new theme was introduced entitled "We Are PBA" performed by Quest. It was used as the background music of both TV and radio coverage until the 2017-18 PBA Philippine Cup.

"Ito ang Liga" was reinstated for the 2017-18 PBA Philippine Cup Finals and was used until the 2022-23 PBA Commissioner's Cup, albeit being altered to fit the mottos of the following seasons:

- 2017-2018: Laro Mo 'To (Tagalog for This Is Your Game); a marching band rendition was used.
- 2019: Laban kung Laban; Shantidope was featured in the song, rapping after the "Ito ang Liga" chorus.
- 2020 and 2021: Tayo ang Bida; sung by Sam Concepcion and Gloc-9.
- 2022-2023: Game Tayo Dito!; performed by Thyro Alfaro

Beginning October 17, 2022, amidst the middle of the 2022-23 PBA Commissioner's Cup, a new official theme song was introduced, entitled "Level Up," also performed by Thyro Alfaro, although, the "Ito ang Liga" was still being used as secondary theme song and for in-venue music purposes.

For the 2023-24 PBA season on A2Z, the "Level Up" theme song has a new rendition introducing the PBA's new slogan. "Angat ang Laban" is the title of new rendition, retaining the other lines from the lyrics of "Level Up". This was used from 2023-24 PBA Commissioner's Cup to 2025 PBA Philippine Cup.

For the PBA's 50th season, a new official theme song is introduced, which is called "SOLID", which was composed by Marcy Reyes and Vehnee Saturno and are sung by Cueshé and Adrian Adeyas, with production from MQ Music.

=== Broadcast history (free to air) ===
- AKTV on IBC (October 2, 2011 – May 12, 2013)
- Sports5 on IBC (August 14, 2013 – October 7, 2013)
- Sports5 on TV5 (May 15–19, October 11, 2013 – October 8, 2017)
- ESPN5 (October 13, 2017 – January 17, 2020)
- One Sports (March 8, 2020 – July 30, 2023)
- A2Z (November 5, 2023 – February 11, 2024; canceled)
- One PH (November 11, 2023 – March 23, 2024)
- CNN Philippines (January 6–28, 2024)
- RPTV (February 2, 2024–present)

== List of broadcasters ==
=== TV panel ===
==== Play by Play ====
- Charlie Cuna (2012–present)
- Andrei Felix (2024–present)
- Paolo del Rosario (2018–present)
- Magoo Marjon (2011–present)
- Carlo Pamintuan (2015–present)
- Chuck Araneta (2017–22, 2026–present)
- Sev Sarmenta (2011, 2015–present)
- Anthony Suntay (2015–18, 2023–present)
- Jutt Sulit (2014–15, 2016–17, 2019–present)
- Andre Co (2021–present)
- Mikee Reyes (2022–present)
- Jinno Rufino (2021–present)

==== Analyst ====
- Jolly Escobar (2012–17, 2021–present)
- Ryan Gregorio (2011–13, 2014–present)
- Vince Hizon (2016–17, 2021–present)
- Quinito Henson (2011–present)
- Andy Jao (2014–present)
- Ali Peek (2014–present)
- Eric Reyes (2012–present)
- Charles Tiu (2015–present)
- Jong Uichico (2016–present)
- Dominic Uy (2011–present)
- Mark Molina (2021–present)
- Topex Robinson (2023–present)
- Ronnie Magsanoc (2011–15, 2023–present)
- Eric Altamirano (2023–present)
- Larry Fonacier (2026–present)

==== Courtside Reporter ====
- Bea Escudero (2019–present)
- Eileen Shi (2022–present)
- Ela Gomez (2022–present)
- Belle Gregorio (2022–present)
- Nadj Miravalles (2022-present)
- Jamie Lim (2025–present)
- Patrice Dabao (2026–present)

==== Previous ====
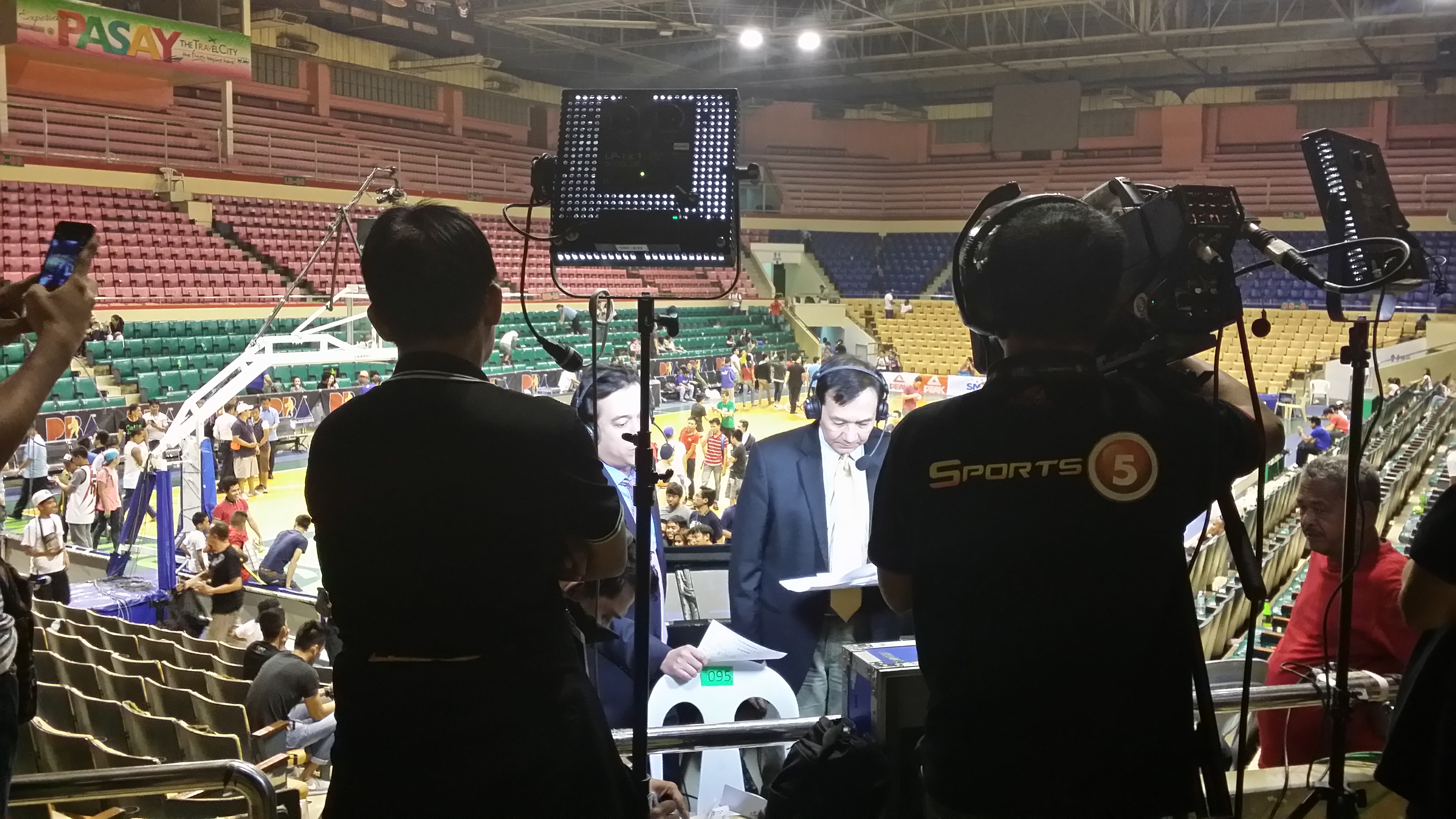
Magoo Marjon and Quinito Henson anchors a game between San Miguel Beermen and NLEX Road Warriors at the Cuneta Astrodome last December 9, 2015.

- Don Allado (game analyst (PBA Rush): 2016–19)
- Ramon Bautista (Sports5 Center segment host, 2013–14)
- Patricia Bermudez-Hizon (AKTV Center host, 2011–12)
- Lia Cruz (Home Court segment, 2012)
- Mara Aquino (MoneyBall host, sideline reporter: 2014–18)
- Richard del Rosario (AKTV Center host, 2011–13)*
- Mich Del Carmen (sideline reporter: 2017)
- Ai dela Cruz (sideline reporter: 2014–15)
- Selina Dagdag-Alas (2016–21)
- Rizza Diaz (halftime show host, sideline reporter: 2013–19)
- Rado Dimalibot (play-by-play, game analyst: 2012–14, 2015)
- Kenneth Duremdes (game analyst, 2012–13)
- Amanda Fernandez (game analyst, play-by-play, sideline reporter (PBA Rush): 2018–19)
- Carla Lizardo (2014–2019)
- Denise Tan (2016-2022)
- Apple David (2014–2026)
- Jayvee Gayoso (game analyst: 2016–17)
- Sel Guevara (sideline reporter: 2011–13, 2014–18)
- Mico Halili (play-by-play: 2011–15)
- Jojo Lastimosa (game analyst, Sports5 Center analyst: 2011–12, 2014)
- Frankie Lim (game analyst, 2011–14)
- Miakka Lim (sideline reporter, 2012)
- Cesca Litton-Kalaw (sideline reporter: 2018–2023)
- Chino Lui Pio (Sports5 Center host: 2016–2018)
- Jessica Mendoza (sideline reporter, 2011–13)
- Eric Menk (game analyst: 2017)
- L.A. Mumar (sideline reporter, 2011–12)
- Erika Padilla (Sports5 Center host, sideline reporter: 2011–17)
- Trish Roque (Sports5 Center host, sideline reporter: 2016–17)
- Barry Pascua (game analyst, 2011)
- Nikko Ramos (play-by-play, sideline reporter, Sports5 Center host, MoneyBall host: 2012–14)
- Jinno Rufino (sideline reporter (PBA Rush): 2019)
- Judy Saril (MoneyBall host: 2014, sideline reporter)
- Angelika Schmeing-Cruz (sideline reporter, 2011)
- Luigi Trillo (game analyst: 2014)
- Jason Webb (game analyst: 2011–14)
- Sam YG (Sports5 Center segment host, 2013–14)
- Noel Zarate (play-by-play: 2014–17)

=== Fox Sports panel ===
- Jude Turcuato (play-by-play, 2013–15) (Also worked as VP for Territory Head of Fox International Channels Philippines)
- Patricia Bermudez-Hizon (play-by-play, 2013–15)
- Vince Hizon (game analyst, 2013–15)
- Charles Tiu (game analyst, 2013–15)
- Ronnie Magsanoc (game analyst: 2014–15)
- Shawn Weinstein (play-by-play, 2014–15)
- Kirk Long (game analyst, 2014–2015)
- Nicholas Nathanielsz (play-by-play, 2015)
- Aaron Atayde (play-by-play: 2013–14)
- Mico Halili (lead play-by-play: 2013–15)
- Jason Webb (game analyst, 2013–14)
- Alex Compton (game analyst, 2013–14)
- Chiqui Reyes (play-by-play, 2013–14)
- James Velasquez (play-by-play, 2013–14)
- Nikko Ramos (play-by-play, 2014–15)
- Andrei Felix (play-by-play, 2015)

=== Radio coverage panel ===
- Chuck Araneta (play-by-play, studio host)
- Koy Banal (game analyst)
- Apple David (studio host)
- Mich Del Carmen (studio host)
- Rizza Diaz (studio host)
- Jolly Escobar (play-by-play, game analyst)
- Wesley Gonzales (game analyst)
- Carla Lizardo (studio host)
- Ali Peek (game analyst)
- Cesca Litton-Kalaw (studio host)
- Chiqui Reyes (play-by-play, game analyst)
- Benjie Santiago (play-by-play)
- Renren Ritualo (game analyst)
- Boybits Victoria (game analyst)
- James Velasquez (play by play, studio host)
- Jinno Rufino (studio host)

==== Previous ====
- Mara Aquino (studio host)
- Denise Tan (studio host)
- Noel Zarate (play by play)
- Barry Pascua (game analyst)
- Joanne Ignacio (play-by-play, studio host)

* - denotes that the broadcaster can only host if their affiliated PBA team had no game for that coverage day.

== See also ==
- PBA on Vintage Sports
- PBA on Viva TV
- PBA on NBN/IBC
- PBA on ABC
- Philippine Basketball Association
- PBA Rush
- ESPN5
- One Sports
- List of TV5 (Philippine TV network) original programming
- List of programs broadcast by One Sports
- List of CNN Philippines original programming

| Preceded by PBA on Solar Sports | PBA TV coverage partners 2011–present | Incumbent |
