= Jong Uichico =

Filipino basketball coach

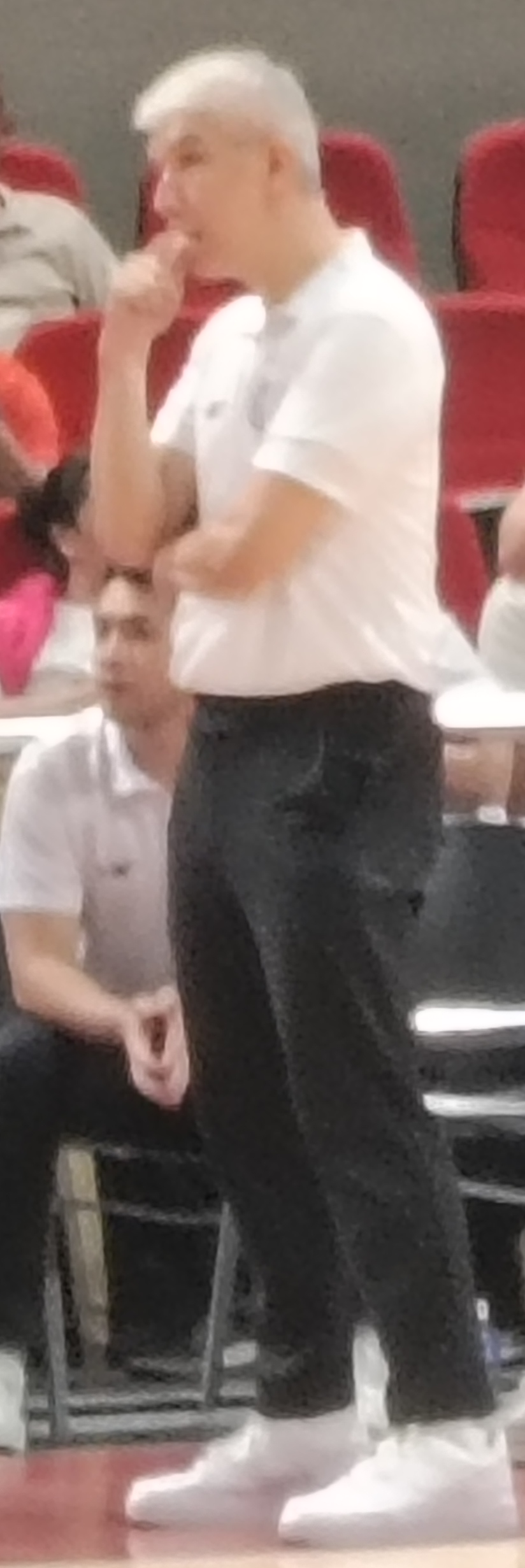
- Uichico in 2025

NLEX Road Warriors
- Position: Assistant coach
- League: PBA

Personal information
- Born: July 15, 1962 (age 64)

Career information
- College: De La Salle (1979–1983)

Career history

Coaching
- 1993–1998: San Miguel Beermen (assistant)
- 1996–1997: De La Salle
- 1999–2006: San Miguel Beermen
- 2002: Philippines
- 2006–2012: Barangay Ginebra Kings
- 2012–2014: Meralco Bolts (team consultant)
- 2013: Philippines
- 2014: Talk 'N Text Tropang Texters (assistant)
- 2014–2016: TNT KaTropa
- 2017: Philippines
- 2019–2020: Bataan Risers
- 2019–present: Philippines (assistant)
- 2020: Philippines
- 2023–2024: NLEX Road Warriors (assistant)
- 2024–2026: NLEX Road Warriors
- 2026–present: NLEX Road Warriors (assistant)

Career highlights
- As head coach: 9× PBA champion (1999 Commissioner's, 1999 Governors', 2000 Commissioner's, 2000 Governors', 2001 All-Filipino, 2005 Fiesta, 2007 Philippine, 2008 Fiesta, 2015 Commissioner's); 2× PBA Coach of the Year (2000, 2007); 2× PBA All-Star Game Head Coach (2001, 2007); As assistant coach: 2× PBA champion (1993 Governors', 1994 All-Filipino)
Medals
Men's basketball
Philippines
FIBA Asia Under-18 Championship
Gold medal – first place	1982 Manila	Team
Head coach for Philippines
SEABA Cup
Gold medal – first place	2012 Chiang Mai	Team
SEA Games
Gold medal – first place	2013 Naypyidaw	Team
Gold medal – first place	2017 Kuala Lumpur	Team
Assistant coach for Philippines
FIBA Asia Championship
Silver medal – second place	2013 Manila	Team
Silver medal – second place	2015 Changsha	Team
Asian Games
Gold medal – first place	2022 Hangzhou	Team
SEA Games
Silver medal – second place	2021 Hanoi	Team
Gold medal – first place	2023 Phnom Penh	Team

Joseph Enrique "Jong" Floro Uichico (born July 15, 1962) is a Filipino professional basketball coach who is serves as an assistant coach of NLEX Road Warriors in the Philippine Basketball Association (PBA). Uichico is a former Philippine national team Youth member and a former player and head coach of the La Salle Green Archers in the UAAP before replacing Ron Jacobs as SMB coach in 1999. Uichico was coach of the San Miguel Beermen from 1999–2006, leading the Beermen to six PBA championships.

== Basketball career ==
Uichico played for the La Salle Green Archers in the collegiate ranks. He was a member of the 1982 RP Youth Team that won the ABC Under-18 Championship. After a stint with the famed Northern Consolidated Cement squad of Ron Jacobs, Uichico ended his basketball career early.

== Coaching career ==
=== Early years ===
In the mid-1990s, Uichico had a coaching stint with the Green Archers and guided them to two runner-up trophies. He also joined the Magnolia Beverage Masters coaching staff during Norman Black and Jacobs tenure. In 1999, Uichico became the new head coach of the Beermen after Jacobs' departure.

=== San Miguel Beermen ===
After an early elimination in the All-Filipino Cup, he coached the Beermen to the Commissioner and Governors Cup titles during the 1999 campaign, ending San Miguel's five-year title drought. He is also the first rookie coach to lead his team to back-to-back titles in the same year, a feat duplicated by Siot Tanquingcen in 2005.

In 2000, Uichico once again guided San Miguel to two more titles and laid claim to his first and only Coach of the Year plum. His first All-Filipino Cup title with the Beermen came in 2001, defeating sister team Barangay Ginebra Kings.

He returned as San Miguel's head coach after the Asian Games campaign, but went on a four-year title drought before winning his sixth PBA title in six years in the 2005 Fiesta Conference. The Beermen defeated the Talk 'N Text Phone Pals, 4–1.

=== Barangay Ginebra ===
On August 3, 2006, Chot Reyes was named as the new head coach of the San Miguel Beermen replacing Uichico and the San Miguel Corporation moved Uichico to San Miguel's sister team the Barangay Ginebra Kings replacing Siot Tanquingcen, who was demoted as one of Uichico's assistants. On his first Ginebra coaching stint, he was able to win a championship in the 2006–07 PBA Philippine Cup that season. A year later, he won his 2nd championship with the Gin Kings in the 2008 PBA Fiesta Conference and his 8th overall title.

In 2012, he left Ginebra to coach the Smart Gilas National Team.

=== Talk 'N Text ===
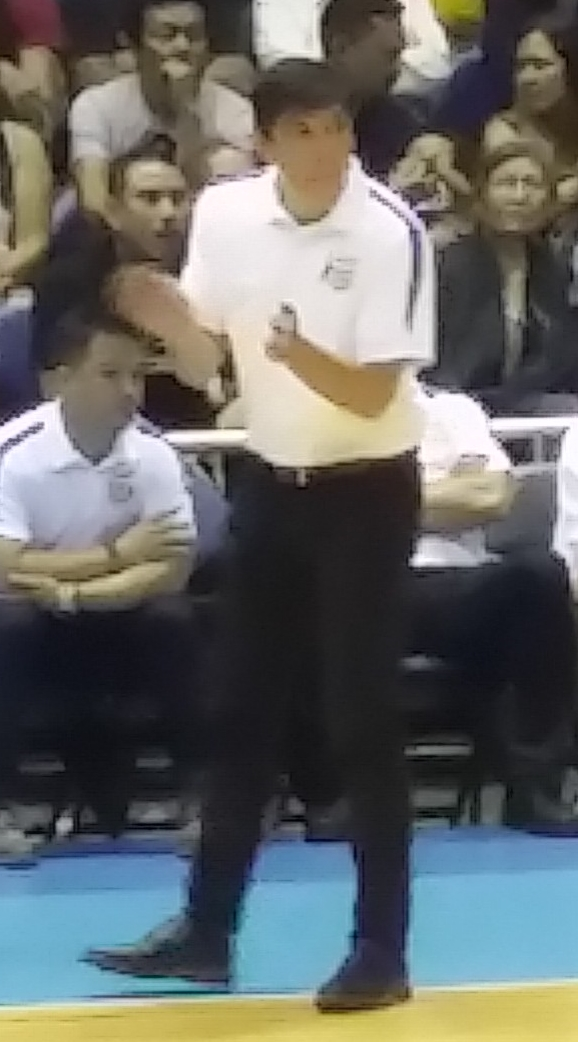
Uichico with Talk 'N Text in 2015

On July 9, 2014, The MVP group shuffled the coaches of Meralco Bolts, NLEX Road Warriors and Talk 'N Text Tropang Texters and as a result Norman Black would be the head coach of Meralco Bolts and Uichico would replace him as the new head coach of Talk 'N Text Tropang Texters.

On April 29, 2015, Uichico got his ninth championship with the Tropang Texters after defeating the Rain or Shine Elasto Painters in seven games.

=== Philippines at the 2017 Southeast Asian Games ===
Uichico led the Philippine national team that will participate at the 2017 Southeast Asian Games instead of the Chot Reyes, who will be leading the Philippine squad which will compete at the 2017 FIBA Asia Cup due to an overlapping schedule between the two competitions.

=== List of PBA championships ===
- 9× PBA champion, 14× Finals Appearances
- San Miguel Franchise (6):
  - 1999 Commissioner's
  - 1999 Governors'
  - 2000 Commissioner's
  - 2000 Governors'
  - 2001 All-Filipino
  - 2005 Fiesta
- Ginebra Franchise (2):
  - 2006-07 Philippine
  - 2008 Fiesta
- Talk 'N Text Franchise (1):
  - 2015 Commissioner's

=== National team ===
Ron Jacobs appointed Uichico as one of his assistants for the RP team's 2002 Asian Games campaign. However, after Jacobs suffered a stroke, Uichico was named as the new head coach of the national squad. Uichico guided the Philippines to a fourth-place finish in the event. Their semifinal loss against eventual tournament winner South Korea was a crushing blow for Uichico's squad losing by one point on a Lee Sang-min triple in the final seconds. Despite the loss, the team still brought home what is known to Filipino basketball fans as "The Silent Gold."

He returned in 2013 as an assistant coach for national team and helped the team to win two silver medals in 2013 and 2015 FIBA Asia Championships.

But in 2018, Uichico was slapped a three-game suspension after he was caught on video joining a mob that attacked an already fallen Chris Goulding of Australian team in 2019 FIBA World Cup Asian qualifiers game at the Philippine Arena.

== Coaching record ==
=== Collegiate record ===
Season	Team	Elimination round					Playoffs				
Season	Team	GP	W	L	PCT	Finish	GP	W	L	PCT	Results
1996	DLSU	14	11	3	.786	1st	3	1	2	.333	Runner-up
1997	DLSU	14	10	4	.714	3rd	4	2	2	.500	Runner-up
Totals		28	21	7	.750		7	3	4	.429	0 championships

=== Professional record ===
Season	Conference	Team	Elimination/classification round					Playoffs				
Season	Conference	Team	GP	W	L	PCT	Finish	GP	W	L	PCT	Results
1999	All-Filipino Cup	San Miguel	16	8	8	.500	5th	1	0	1	.000	Quarterfinals
1999	Commissioner's Cup	San Miguel	8	5	3	.625	4th	12	8	4	.667	Champions
1999	Governors' Cup	San Miguel	8	6	2	.750	3rd	10	8	2	.800	Champions
2000	All-Filipino Cup	San Miguel	14	10	4	.714	2nd	6	2	4	.333	Third place
2000	Commissioner's Cup	San Miguel	9	7	2	.778	1st	9	8	1	.889	Champions
2000	Governors' Cup	San Miguel	9	4	5	.444	6th	11	9	2	.818	Champions
2001	All-Filipino Cup	San Miguel	14	9	5	.643	1st	12	8	4	.667	Champions
2001	Commissioner's Cup	San Miguel	9	7	2	.778	1st	12	6	6	.500	Runner-up
2001	Governors' Cup	San Miguel	13	7	6	.538	4th	9	5	4	.556	Runner-up
2002	Governors' Cup	San Miguel	11	5	6	.455	8th	8	4	4	.500	Third place
2002	Commissioner's Cup	San Miguel	10	6	4	.600	4th	7	3	4	.429	Third place
2002	All-Filipino Cup	San Miguel	9	6	3	.667	2nd	4	2	2	.500	Third place
2003	All-Filipino Cup	San Miguel	18	12	6	.667	1st (A)	3	1	2	.333	Quarterfinals
2003	Invitational	San Miguel	4	2	2	.500	3rd (B)	—	—	—	—	Eliminated
2003	Reinforced	San Miguel	13	5	8	.385	3rd (A)	12	8	4	.667	Runner-up
2004 Fiesta		San Miguel	18	16	2	.889	1st	3	1	2	.333	Quarterfinals
2004–05	Philippine Cup	San Miguel	18	9	9	.500	5th	10	7	3	.700	Third place
2004–05	Fiesta	San Miguel	18	11	7	.611	2nd	9	7	2	.778	Champions
2005–06	Fiesta	San Miguel	16	6	10	.375	8th	4	2	2	.500	Wildcard round
2005–06	Philippine Cup	San Miguel	16	11	5	.688	2nd	8	3	5	.375	Fourth place
2006–07	Philippine Cup	Ginebra	18	13	5	.722	1st	12	8	4	.667	Champions
2006–07	Fiesta	Ginebra	18	12	6	.667	3rd	2	1	1	.500	Quarterfinals
2007–08	Philippine Cup	Ginebra	18	8	10	.444	7th	1	0	1	.000	Wildcard phase
2007–08	Fiesta	Ginebra	18	10	8	.556	3rd	13	10	3	.769	Champions
2008–09	Philippine Cup	Ginebra	18	10	8	.556	3rd	3	1	2	.333	Quarterfinals
2008–09	Fiesta	Ginebra	14	8	6	.571	2nd	14	8	6	.571	Runners-up
2009–10	Philippine Cup	Ginebra	18	12	6	.667	4th	10	3	7	.300	Fourth place
2009–10	Fiesta	Ginebra	18	9	9	.500	5th	5	2	3	.400	Quarterfinals
2010–11	Philippine Cup	Ginebra	14	10	4	.714	3rd	9	4	5	.444	Semifinals
2010–11	Commissioner's Cup	Ginebra	9	5	4	.556	3rd	13	7	6	.538	Runner-up
2010–11	Governors' Cup	Ginebra	8	5	3	.625	4th	5	3	2	.600	Semifinals
2014–15	Philippine Cup	Talk 'N Text	11	8	3	.727	4th	6	2	4	.333	Semifinals
2014–15	Commissioner's Cup	Talk 'N Text	11	8	3	.727	2nd	12	8	4	.667	Champions
2014–15	Governors' Cup	Talk 'N Text	11	5	6	.455	10th	—	—	—	—	Eliminated
2015–16	Philippine Cup	TNT	11	6	5	.545	6th	2	1	1	.500	Quarterfinals 1st phase
2015–16	Commissioner's Cup	TNT	11	6	5	.545	6th	3	1	2	.333	Quarterfinals
2015–16	Governors' Cup	TNT	11	10	1	.909	1st	5	2	3	.400	Semifinals
2019–20		Bataan	12	6	6	.500	(resigned)	—	—	—	—	(resigned)
Totals			500	303	197	.606		265	153	112	.577	9 championships

=== National team record ===
Tournament	Team	Preliminary round					Final round				
Tournament	Team	GP	W	L	PCT	Finish	GP	W	L	PCT	Results
2002 Asian Games	Philippines	2	2	0	1.000	1st (C)	5	2	3	.400	Fourth place
2013 SEA Games	Philippines	6	6	0	1.00	1st	—	—	—	—	(gold) Gold medal
2017 SEA Games	Philippines	3	3	0	1.000	1st (A)	2	2	0	1.000	(gold) Gold medal
2022 FIBA Asia Cup qualifying	Philippines	3	3	0	1.000	(resigned)	—	—	—	—	(resigned)
Totals		14	14	0	1.000		7	4	3	.571	2 gold medals

Preceded by Virgil Villavicencio	De La Salle Green Archers men's basketball head coach 1996-1997	Succeeded by Franz Pumaren
Preceded by Ron Jacobs; Siot Tanquingcen	San Miguel Beermen head coach 1999-2002; 2003-2006	Succeeded by Siot Tanquingcen; Chot Reyes
Preceded by Tim Cone	Philippine national basketball team Asian Games Head Coach; 2002	Succeeded by Rajko Toroman (2010)
Preceded by Siot Tanquingcen	Barangay Ginebra Kings Head Coach; 2006-2012	Succeeded by Siot Tanquingcen
Preceded by Norman Black	Talk 'N Text Tropang Texters Head Coach; 2014-2016	Succeeded by Nash Racela
