= List of Shell Turbo Chargers seasons =

Legend
Champion

Runner-up

Semifinalist

This is a list of seasons by the Shell Turbo Chargers of the Philippine Basketball Association.

== Three-conference era ==
Season	Conference	Team name	Overall record			Finals
Season	Conference	Team name	W	L	%	Finals
1985	Open Conference	Shell Azodrin Bugbusters	16	32	.333	
1985	All-Filipino Conference	Shell Azodrin Bugbusters	16	32	.333	Great Taste 3, Shell 1
1985	Reinforced Conference	Shell Azodrin Bugbusters	16	32	.333	
1986	Reinforced Conference	Pilipinas Shell Oilers	20	32	.385	
1986	All-Filipino Conference	Shell Helix Oilers	20	32	.385	
1986	Open Conference	Formula Shell Spark Aiders	20	32	.385	
1987	Open Conference	Formula Shell Spark Aiders	18	36	.333	
1987	All-Filipino Conference	Formula Shell Spark Aiders	18	36	.333	
1987	Reinforced Conference	Shell Azocord Super Bugbusters	18	36	.333	
1988	Open Conference	Shell Helix Oilers	16	29	.356	
1988	All-Filipino Conference	Shell Rimula X Diesel Oilers	16	29	.356	
1988	Reinforced Conference	Shell Rimula X Diesel Oilers	16	29	.356	San Miguel 4, Shell 1
1989	Open Conference	Formula Shell Zoom Masters	27	30	.474	San Miguel 4, Shell 1
1989	All-Filipino Conference	Formula Shell Zoom Masters	27	30	.474	
1989	Reinforced Conference	Formula Shell Zoom Masters	27	30	.474	
1990	First Conference	Formula Shell Zoom Masters	35	21	.625	Shell 4, Añejo 2
1990	All-Filipino Conference	Formula Shell Zoom Masters	35	21	.625	
1990	Third Conference	Shell Rimula X	35	21	.625	
1991	First Conference	Shell Rimula X	23	25	.479	Ginebra 4, Shell 3
1991	All-Filipino Conference	Shell Rimula X	23	25	.479	
1991	Third Conference	Shell Rimula X	23	25	.479	
1992	First Conference	Shell Rimula X	27	27	.500	Shell 4, San Miguel 1
1992	All-Filipino Conference	Shell Rimula X	27	27	.500	
1992	Third Conference	Shell Rimula X	27	27	.500	
1993	All-Filipino Cup	Shell Rimula X	14	29	.326	
1993	Commissioner's Cup	Shell Helix Oilers	14	29	.326	
1993	Governors Cup	Shell Helix Oilers	14	29	.326	
1994	All-Filipino Cup	Shell Rimula X	20	30	.400	
1994	Commissioner's Cup	Shell Rimula X	20	30	.400	
1994	Governors Cup	Shell Rimula X	20	30	.400	
1995	All-Filipino Cup	Shell Rimula X	20	34	.370	
1995	Commissioner's Cup	Formula Shell Gas Kings	20	34	.370	
1995	Governors Cup	Formula Shell Zoom Masters	20	34	.370	
1996	All-Filipino Cup	Formula Shell Zoom Masters	33	32	.508	
1996	Commissioner's Cup	Formula Shell Zoom Masters	33	32	.508	Alaska 4, Shell 3
1996	Governors Cup	Formula Shell Zoom Masters	33	32	.508	
1997	All-Filipino Cup	Formula Shell Zoom Masters	15	31	.326	
1997	Commissioner's Cup	Formula Shell Zoom Masters	15	31	.326	
1997	Governors Cup	Formula Shell Zoom Masters	15	31	.326	
1998	All-Filipino Cup	Formula Shell Zoom Masters	31	30	.508	
1998	Commissioner's Cup	Formula Shell Zoom Masters	31	30	.508	
1998	Centennial Cup	Formula Shell Zoom Masters	31	30	.508	Mobiline 1, Shell 0
1998	Governors Cup	Formula Shell Zoom Masters	31	30	.508	Shell 4, Mobiline 3
1999	All-Filipino Cup	Formula Shell Zoom Masters	32	24	.571	Shell 4, Tanduay 2
1999	Commissioner's Cup	Formula Shell Zoom Masters	32	24	.571	San Miguel 4, Shell 2
1999	Governors Cup	Shell Velocity	32	24	.571	
2000	All-Filipino Cup	Shell Velocity	5	10	.375	
2000	Commissioner's Cup	Shell Velocity	3	6	.333	
Governors Cup	1	8	.111			
2001	All-Filipino Cup	Shell Turbo Chargers	12	10	.545	
2001	Commissioner's Cup	Shell Turbo Chargers	3	7	.300	
2001	Governors Cup	Shell Turbo Chargers	10	9	.526	
2002	Governors Cup	Shell Turbo Chargers	2	9	.273	
2002	Commissioner's Cup	Shell Turbo Chargers	4	7	.364	
2002	All-Filipino Cup	Shell Turbo Chargers	4	6	.400	
2003	All-Filipino Cup	Shell Turbo Chargers	5	13	.277	
2003	Invitational Conference	Shell Turbo Chargers	2	2	.500	
2003	Reinforced Conference	Shell Turbo Chargers	3	10	.230	
Overall record			401	530	.431	4 championships

== Two-conference era ==
Season	Conference	Team name	Elim./Clas. round				Playoffs	
Season	Conference	Team name	Finish	W	L	%	Stage	Results
(2004)	Fiesta Conference	Shell Turbo Chargers	8th	7	11	.389	Wildcard phase	Red Bull 83, Shell 82
2004-05	Philippine Cup	Shell Turbo Chargers	3rd	12	6	.667	Semifinals; 2nd-seed playoff 3rd-place playoff	3rd overall (15-8, tied) 3-2 in semifinals Talk 'N Text 85, Shell 79; San Miguel 105, Shell 100*
2004-05	Fiesta Conference	Shell Turbo Chargers	9th	7	11	.389	Wildcard phase Quarterfinals; Semifinals; 3rd-place playoff	Shell def. Sta. Lucia** in 2 games Shell 2, Purefoods 0 Talk 'N Text 3, Shell 1 Shell 102, Red Bull 86*
Elimination round				26	28	.482	2 post-wildcard appearances	
Playoffs				9	10	.473	0 championships	

*one-game playoffs
**team had twice-to-beat advantage

== Cumulative records ==
Era	W	L	PCT
Three-conference era (1985–2003)	401	530	.431
Two-conference era (2004–2005)	35	38	.479
Total	436	568	.434
