= 2002 PBA All-Filipino Cup finals =

Philippine basketball championship series

Team	Coach	Wins
Coca-Cola Tigers	Chot Reyes	3
Alaska Aces	Tim Cone	1
- Dates: December 18–25, 2002
- MVP: Rudy Hatfield
- Television: VTV (IBC)
- Radio network: DZSR

PBA All-Filipino Cup finals chronology
- < 2001 2003 >

PBA finals chronology
- < 2002 Commissioner's 2003 All-Filipino >

The 2002 Selecta-PBA All-Filipino Cup finals was the best-of-5 basketball championship series of the 2002 PBA All-Filipino Cup and the conclusion of the conference's playoffs. The Coca-Cola Tigers and Alaska Aces played for the 83rd championship contested by the league.

Coca Cola win their 1st PBA title with a 3–1 series victory over the Alaska as history was made on Christmas Day with the Tigers becoming the first team to win a championship in their first season.

== Series scoring summary ==
Team	Game 1	Game 2	Game 3	Game 4	Wins
Coca-Cola	67	72	62	78	3
Alaska	70	69	60	63	1

== Games summary ==
=== Game 1 ===
Viva TV

December 18

Coca-Cola Tigers 67, Alaska Aces 70
Alaska leads series, 1–0

Cuneta Astrodome, Pasay

=== Game 2 ===
Viva TV

December 20

recap

Coca-Cola Tigers 72, Alaska Aces 69 (OT)
Scoring by quarter: 14–18, 18–14, 15–14, 12–13, Overtime: 13–10
Pts: Renato Morano 23	Pts: Kenneth Duremdes 23
series tied, 1–1

Araneta Coliseum, Quezon City

Ato Morano pumped in 8 of his game-high 23 points in the extension period as he filled in for the Tigers' reliable scorers, Johnny Abarrientos and Jeffrey Cariaso, who were sideline by injuries they sustained in the finals and semifinals, respectively, Rudy Hatfield buried a triple barely a minute left in overtime that keyed the Tigers' breakaway, Morano's free throws made it 70–64 but Kenneth Duremdes and Don Allado converted five straight points in the final 16 seconds that kept the Aces in the game, Rob Duat could have sent the game into second overtime but his two three-pointers rattled out at the final buzzer.

=== Game 3 ===
Viva TV

December 22

recap

Coca-Cola Tigers 62, Alaska Aces 60 (OT)
Scoring by quarter: 20–7, 13–13, 5–16, 13–15, Overtime: 11–9
Pts: Rudy Hatfield 19	Pts: John Arigo 23
Coca-Cola leads series, 2–1

Araneta Coliseum, Quezon City

Kenneth Duremdes missed a potential game-winning shot with 4 ticks left as Coca Cola stole another overtime victory and moved the Tigers to within a win of capturing the title, the Aces were contesting what looked like a three-point shot drained by John Arigo in the last 43 seconds. Arigo's jumper could have tied the game at 60-all but referee Mario Montiel assessed the shot as only two points, giving the Tigers a one-point lead in the process, Television cameras showed Arigo's attempt was way out of the three-point line, the final count was an all-time low for a PBA championship series with the Tigers scoring only five points in the third quarter and typified the game's offensive drought in some stretches.

=== Game 4 ===
Viva TV

December 25

Coca-Cola Tigers 78, Alaska Aces 63
Scoring by quarter: 27–22, 10–11, 22–14, 19–16
Pts: Rudy Hatfield 20	Pts: Ali Peek 19
Coca-Cola wins series, 3–1

Araneta Coliseum, Quezon City

Rafi Reavis led a big third quarter attack as he buried three triples, including a buzzer-beater that towed the Tigers to a 59–47 advantage entering the final period, from there, it was an all Coca Cola show with Ato Morano's hot-shooting and Rudy Hatfield, adjudged the finals MVP, battling for every possession, the Tigers cemented their place in PBA history.

2002 PBA All-Filipino Cup Champions

Coca-Cola Tigers
First title

== Roster ==
Coca-Cola Tigers roster
Players

Pos.	#	POB	Name	Height	Weight	DOB (YYYY–MM–DD)	From
G/F	3	(Philippines)	Jojo Manalo	6 ft 2 in (1.88 m)			UPHSD
C	4	(United States)	Rafi Reavis	6 ft 8 in (2.03 m)			Coppin State
C	9	(Philippines)	Gilbert Lao	6 ft 8 in (2.03 m)			UST
G	10	(Philippines)	Renato Morano	6 ft 0 in (1.83 m)			San Beda
G	14	(Philippines)	Johnny Abarrientos (injured)	5 ft 8 in (1.73 m)			Far Eastern
G	18	(Philippines)	Leo Avenido	6 ft 2 in (1.88 m)			Far Eastern
G	22	(United States)	Jeffrey Cariaso	6 ft 2 in (1.88 m)			Sonoma State
C	24	(Philippines)	Cris Bolado	6 ft 7 in (2.01 m)			National-U
F	25	(Philippines)	Freddie Abuda	6 ft 4 in (1.93 m)			Cebu
C		(Philippines)	Jovie Sese	6 ft 6 in (1.98 m)			MLQU
G	31	(United States)	William Antonio	6 ft 3 in (1.91 m)			Chaminade
C	32	(Philippines)	Poch Juinio	6 ft 5 in (1.96 m)			Philippines
F	99	(United States)	Rudy Hatfield	6 ft 3 in (1.91 m)			UM–Dearborn

Coaches
Head coach
- (Philippines) Chot Reyes
Assistant(s)
- (Philippines) Biboy Ravanes
- (Philippines) Binky Favis
- (Philippines) Aboy Castro
- (Philippines) Mike Reyes

Legend
- (DP) Unsigned draft pick
- (FA) Free agent
- (S) Suspended
- Injured

Alaska Aces roster
Players

Pos.	#	POB	Name	Height	Weight	DOB (YYYY–MM–DD)	From
G	1	(United States)	Philip Newton	6 ft 2 in (1.88 m)
F	2	(United States)	Ali Peek	6 ft 4 in (1.93 m)			Saint Mary's
F	5	(United States)	Rob Duat	6 ft 4 in (1.93 m)			Menlo
G	6	(Philippines)	Jojo Lastimosa	6 ft 0 in (1.83 m)			USJ–R
G	7	(United States)	Jon Ordonio	6 ft 2 in (1.88 m)			Master's
C	8	(Philippines)	Don Allado	6 ft 6 in (1.98 m)			De La Salle
G	9	(Philippines)	Rodney Santos	6 ft 1 in (1.85 m)			San Sebastian
F	10	(Philippines)	Eric Reyes	6 ft 3 in (1.91 m)			Ateneo
G/F	19	(Philippines)	Kenneth Duremdes	6 ft 3 in (1.91 m)			Adamson
F	31	(United States)	John Arigo	6 ft 4 in (1.93 m)			Tampa
C	32	(Philippines)	EJ Feihl	7 ft 1 in (2.16 m)			Adamson
F	41	(United States)	Miguel Noble	6 ft 5 in (1.96 m)			Utica

Coaches
Head coach
- (United States) Tim Cone
Assistant(s)
- (Philippines) Richard Bachmann
- (Philippines) Gilbert Reyes
- (Philippines) Luigi Trillo

Legend
- (DP) Unsigned draft pick
- (FA) Free agent
- (S) Suspended
- Injured

== Broadcast notes ==
Game	Play-by-play	Analyst	Courtside Reporters & Halftime Hosts
Game 1	Anthony Suntay	Quinito Henson	
Game 2	Noli Eala	TJ Manotoc	
Game 3	Anthony Suntay	Quinito Henson	
Game 4	Noli Eala	Tommy Manotoc	
