= 2000 PBA Governors' Cup finals =

Basketball tournament

2000 PBA Governors Cup finals
Team	Coach	Wins
San Miguel Beermen	Jong Uichico	4
Purefoods TJ Hotdogs	Derrick Pumaren	1
- Dates: December 10–20, 2000
- MVP: Danny Seigle
- Television: Viva TV (IBC)
- Radio network: DZRV

PBA Governors Cup finals chronology
- < 1999 2001 >

PBA finals chronology
- < 2000 Commissioner's 2001 All-Filipino >

The 2000 PBA Governors Cup finals was the best-of-7 championship series of the 2000 PBA Governors Cup and the conclusion of the Conference playoffs. The San Miguel Beermen and Purefoods TJ Hotdogs played for the 77th championship contested by the league.

San Miguel Beermen retains the Governors Cup title and captured their 15th PBA crown, defeating Purefoods TJ Hotdogs in their finals series, four games to one.

Danny Seigle won on his third back-to-back finals MVP in Governors Cup finals.

== Series scoring summary ==
Team	Game 1	Game 2	Game 3	Game 4	Game 5	Wins
San Miguel	85	79	105	95	96	4
Purefoods	79	76	101	107	88	1

== Games summary ==
=== Game 1 ===
Viva TV

December 10

San Miguel Beermen 85, Purefoods TJ Hotdogs 79
Scoring by quarter: 15–25, 27–9, 15–29, 28–16
Pts: Lamont Strothers 27 Danny Seigle 26	Pts: Derrick Brown 27

Araneta Coliseum, Quezon City

The hotdogs went up by six points, 63–57, going into the final quarter and were still ahead, 78–77, with four minutes left to play when Danny Seigle converted on a three-point play with a foul from Derrick Brown, giving the beermen an 80–78 lead. Danny's older brother, Andy Seigle from Purefoods, split his charities to narrow the gap at 79–80, but everything crumbled for the Hotdogs after Danny Seigle rambled downcourt with a fastbreak slam for a three-point beermen lead, 82–79.

=== Game 2 ===
Viva TV

December 13

San Miguel Beermen 79, Purefoods TJ Hotdogs 76
Scoring by quarter: 17–16, 19–18, 24–13, 19–29
Pts: Lamont Strothers 28	Pts: Derrick Brown 32

Philsports Arena, Pasig

Lamont Strothers flicked a baseline fallaway as San Miguel watched Purefoods crumble at crunchtime. Derrick Brown missed three crucial free throws in the last 1.4 seconds. From a 59–72 deficit, the TJ Hotdogs climbed back to tie the count at 76-all on Dindo Pumaren's free throw with a minute left.

=== Game 3 ===
Viva TV

December 15

San Miguel Beermen 105, Purefoods TJ Hotdogs 101 (2OT)
Scoring by quarter: 16–16, 20–21, 20–24, 32–27, Overtime: 17–13
Pts: Lamont Strothers 36	Pts: Derrick Brown 27

Philsports Arena, Pasig

Lamont Strothers hit back-to-back triples as San Miguel struggled to two overtimes to beat Purefoods. Strothers' trey give the beermen a comfortable 105–99 lead with a minute left. The beermen were down by seven at 78–85 with 1:24 to go in regulation. Strothers and Danny Seigle took turns in hitting from the arc to put them within a point, 87–88 with ten seconds left. Strothers could have ended the game in regulation but missed his second free throw on a foul by Derrick Brown with 0.8 seconds left. In the first overtime, Alvin Patrimonio missed a wayward three-pointer with 1.2 seconds left as San Miguel forces second extension at 97-all.

=== Game 4 ===
Viva TV

December 17

San Miguel Beermen 95, Purefoods TJ Hotdogs 107

Araneta Coliseum, Quezon City

A 14–0 burst by the Hotdogs increased their margin to 66–50 at the start of the second half. The beermen tried to come back in the last two minutes of the game, cutting the deficit to four points at 93–97. The Hotdogs wisely used time to its advantages.

=== Game 5 ===
Viva TV

December 20

San Miguel Beermen 96, Purefoods TJ Hotdogs 88
San Miguel wins series, 4–1

Philsports Arena, Pasig

The beermen led by 16 points late in the third quarter as Danny Seigle went on a scoring frenzy. San Miguel used a solid endgame despite Purefoods' comeback try to finish off the hotdogs. Danny Seigle won on his third sophomore back-to-back finals MVP and San Miguel captures on his back to back 2 peat champs 15th title.

2000 PBA Governors Cup Champions

San Miguel Beermen
15th title

== Roster ==
San Miguel Beermen roster
Players

Pos.	#	POB	Name	Height	Weight	DOB (YYYY–MM–DD)	From
G	1	(Philippines)	Emmanuel Victoria	5 ft 10 in (1.78 m)			San Beda
C	3	(United States)	Nic Belasco	6 ft 6 in (1.98 m)			Notre Dame (OH)
C	5	(Philippines)	Ronilo Padilla	6 ft 5 in (1.96 m)			Cebu
G	6	(United States)	Lamont Strothers (I)	6 ft 2 in (1.88 m)			Christopher Newport
F	7	(Philippines)	Michael Mustre	6 ft 1 in (1.85 m)			Letran
F/C	10	(Philippines)	Danny Ildefonso	6 ft 6 in (1.98 m)			National-U
F	15	(Philippines)	Dwight Lago	6 ft 3 in (1.91 m)			De La Salle
G	17	(Philippines)	Olsen Racela	5 ft 10 in (1.78 m)			Ateneo
F	18	(Philippines)	Arturo Dela Cruz	6 ft 3 in (1.91 m)			San Sebastian
F	25	(Philippines)	Freddie Abuda	6 ft 4 in (1.93 m)			Cebu
F	32	(United States)	Robert Duat	6 ft 4 in (1.93 m)			Menlo
F	42	(United States)	Danny Seigle	6 ft 6 in (1.98 m)			Wagner
F/C	44	(Philippines)	June Carmona	6 ft 6 in (1.98 m)			UPHSD

Coaches
Head coach
- (Philippines) Jong Uichico
Assistant(s)
- (Philippines) Siot Tanquingcen

Legend
- (DP) Unsigned draft pick
- (FA) Free agent
- (S) Suspended
- (I) Import
- Injured

Purefoods Tender Juicy Hotdogs roster
Players

Pos.	#	POB	Name	Height	Weight	DOB (YYYY–MM–DD)	From
F	2	(Philippines)	Richard Yee	6 ft 4 in (1.93 m)			UST
F	3	(Philippines)	Braulio Lim	6 ft 3 in (1.91 m)			UE
G	4	(Philippines)	Jessie Cabanayan	5 ft 8 in (1.73 m)			Baguio
G	6	(Philippines)	Boyet Fernandez	5 ft 8 in (1.73 m)			San Agustin
F	7	(Philippines)	Rey Evangelista	6 ft 3 in (1.91 m)			UST
G	10	(Philippines)	Dindo Pumaren	5 ft 9 in (1.75 m)			De La Salle
C	11	(Philippines)	Edward Joseph Feihl	7 ft 1 in (2.16 m)			Adamson
F	16	(Philippines)	Alvin Patrimonio	6 ft 3 in (1.91 m)			Mapúa
G	24	(Philippines)	Rommel Daep	6 ft 2 in (1.88 m)			San Sebastian
G/F	32	(United States)	Derrick Brown (I)	6 ft 3 in (1.91 m)			Providence
G	40	(United States)	Noy Castillo	6 ft 0 in (1.83 m)			The Citadel
C	52	(United States)	Andy Seigle	6 ft 9 in (2.06 m)			LSU New Orleans

Coaches
Head coach
- (Philippines) Derrick Pumaren
Assistant(s)
- (Philippines) Gee Abanilla
- (Philippines) Agustin Tiongco

Legend
- (DP) Unsigned draft pick
- (FA) Free agent
- (S) Suspended
- (I) Import
- Injured

== Broadcast notes ==
Game	Play-by-play	Analyst	Courtside Reporters
Game 1	Noli Eala	Tommy Manotoc	Paolo Trillo
Game 2	Ed Picson	TJ Manotoc	
Game 3	Noli Eala	Andy Jao	
Game 4	Ed Picson	Quinito Henson	Anthony Suntay and Chiqui Roa-Puno
Game 5	Noli Eala	Tommy Manotoc and Yeng Guiao	
