= 2001 PBA All-Filipino Cup finals =

Basketball cup finals

Team	Coach	Wins
San Miguel Beermen	Jong Uichico	4
Barangay Ginebra Kings	Allan Caidic	2
- Dates: May 6–18, 2001
- Television: Viva TV (IBC)
- Radio network: DZRV

PBA All-Filipino Cup finals chronology
- < 2000 2002 >

PBA finals chronology
- < 2000 Governors 2001 Commissioner's >

The 2001 PBA All-Filipino Cup finals was the best-of-7 championship series of the 2001 PBA All-Filipino Cup and the conclusion of the conference's playoffs. The San Miguel Beermen and Barangay Ginebra Kings played for the 78th championship contested by the league.

San Miguel Beermen captured their 16th PBA title, winning their finals series against the Barangay Ginebra Kings in six games.

Danny Seigle won on his fourth finals MVP in All-Filipino Cup finals.

== Series scoring summary ==
Team	Game 1	Game 2	Game 3	Game 4	Game 5	Game 6	Wins
San Miguel	81	89	80	64	98	95	4
Barangay Ginebra	75	72	82	80	95	75	2

== Games summary ==
=== Game 1 ===
Viva TV

May 6

recap

San Miguel Beermen 81, Barangay Ginebra Kings 75
Scoring by quarter: 22–10, 19–19, 17–23, 23–23
Pts: Danny Ildefonso 20 Olsen Racela 20	Pts: Banjo Calpito 13
San Miguel leads series, 1–0

Araneta Coliseum, Quezon City

San Miguel shot 47 percent on the floor in the first quarter as against only 21 percent for Barangay Ginebra as the Beermen took a double-digit lead in the first half and never let the Gin Kings get into the groove, they held off their fast-paced game and expected rallies. The Beermen were on top by 14 points, 72–58, with five minutes left in the final period.

=== Game 2 ===
Viva TV

May 9

recap

San Miguel Beermen 89, Barangay Ginebra Kings 72
Scoring by quarter: 21–19, 22–26, 25–14, 21–13
Pts: Danny Ildefonso 32 Danny Seigle 26	Pts: Mark Caguioa 19
San Miguel leads series, 2–0

Philsports Arena, Pasig

Danny Ildefonso scored 15 of his career-high 32 points in the third quarter as the Beermen outscored the Gin Kings, 25–14, to take a 68–59 lead at the end of 36 minutes of play.

=== Game 3 ===
Viva TV

May 11

San Miguel Beermen 80, Barangay Ginebra Kings 82
San Miguel leads series, 2–1

Philsports Arena, Pasig

Ronald Magtulis' two offensive rebounds off missed shots by Vergel Meneses and Bal David with less than a minute left in the game preserve the Gin Kings in securing a two-point victory.

=== Game 4 ===
Viva TV

May 13

recap

San Miguel Beermen 64, Barangay Ginebra Kings 80
Scoring by quarter: 12–22, 24–11, 13–19, 15–28
Pts: Danny Ildefonso 16	Pts: Vergel Meneses 20
series tied at 2–2

Araneta Coliseum, Quezon City

From a close third quarter, Ginebra suddenly erupted with fastbreak plays and long-range baskets. Danny Seigle was the biggest letdown for the Beermen, shooting 2-of-24 from the floor and 0-of-17 from the outside in San Miguel's worst loss in the conference. Jayjay Helterbrand made 12 of his 14 points while Jun Limpot hit 7 of his 12 points in the fourth quarter.

=== Game 5 ===
Viva TV

May 16

San Miguel Beermen 98, Barangay Ginebra Kings 95 (OT)
Scoring by quarter: 15–17, 16–22, 33–26, 24–23, Overtime: 10–7
Pts: Danny Seigle 28	Pts: Mark Caguioa 30
San Miguel leads series, 3–2

Araneta Coliseum, Quezon City

Danny Ildefonso hit two crucial free throws in the final 16.6 seconds in overtime. After Ildefonso's charities, rookie Mark Caguioa, who made a career-high 30 points, had a chance to push the game into second overtime but his three-pointer bounced off the rim as time expired.

=== Game 6 ===
Viva TV

May 18

San Miguel Beermen 95, Barangay Ginebra Kings 75
Scoring by quarter: 17–20, 33–19, 22–14, 23–22
Pts: Danny Seigle 31	Pts: Vergel Meneses 23 Jun Limpot 22
San Miguel wins series, 4–2

Araneta Coliseum, Quezon City

Danny Seigle, firing from all angles, finished the first half with 19 points. The Beermen took a 50–39 halftime lead and there was no stopping San Miguel from thereon, dominating the boards and pulling away with a flurry of baskets in the third period to open a 19-point spread. The Beermen had their largest lead of 28 points in the fourth quarter at 92–64. Danny Seigle won on his fourth Finals MVP and San Miguel captures won on his championship 16th title.

2001 PBA All-Filipino Cup Champions

San Miguel Beermen
16th title

== Rosters ==
San Miguel Beermen roster
Players
Coaches

Pos.	#	POB	Name	Height	Weight	DOB (YYYY–MM–DD)	From
G	1	(Philippines)	Emmanuel Victoria	5 ft 10 in (1.78 m)			San Beda
C	3	(United States)	Nic Belasco	6 ft 6 in (1.98 m)			Notre Dame (OH)
C	6	(United States)	Dorian Peña	6 ft 6 in (1.98 m)			Coppin State
F	7	(Philippines)	Michael Mustre	6 ft 1 in (1.85 m)			Letran
F/C	10	(Philippines)	Danny Ildefonso	6 ft 6 in (1.98 m)			National-U
F	15	(Philippines)	Dwight Lago	6 ft 3 in (1.91 m)			De La Salle
G	17	(Philippines)	Olsen Racela	5 ft 10 in (1.78 m)			Ateneo
G	21	(Philippines)	Joey Mente	5 ft 11 in (1.80 m)			Lyceum
F/C	22	(Philippines)	Arnold Gamboa	6 ft 6 in (1.98 m)			Far Eastern
F	25	(Philippines)	Freddie Abuda	6 ft 4 in (1.93 m)			Visayas
F		(Philippines)	Henry Fernandez	6 ft 1 in (1.85 m)			Visayas
F	32	(United States)	Rob Duat	6 ft 4 in (1.93 m)			Menlo
F	42	(United States)	Danny Seigle	6 ft 6 in (1.98 m)			Wagner

Head coach

- (Philippines) Jong Uichico

Assistant coach(es)

- (Philippines) Siot Tanquingcen
- (Philippines) Arturo Dela Cruz

Legend

- (C) Team captain
- (CI) Commissioner's Cup Import
- (GI) Governors' Cup Import
- (EI) EASL Import
- (DP) Unsigned draft pick
- (FA) Free agent
- (IN) Inactive
- (S) Suspended
- (R) Rookie
- Injured

Barangay Ginebra Kings roster
Players
Coaches

Pos.	#	POB	Name	Height	Weight	DOB (YYYY–MM–DD)	From
G	1	(Philippines)	Bal David	5 ft 9 in (1.75 m)			UST
F	2	(Philippines)	Vergel Meneses	6 ft 2 in (1.88 m)			José Rizal
G/F	3	(Philippines)	Elmer Lago	6 ft 2 in (1.88 m)			De La Salle
G	4	(Philippines)	Merwin Castelo	6 ft 2 in (1.88 m)			San Beda
F/C	9	(Philippines)	Jun Limpot	6 ft 6 in (1.98 m)			De La Salle
G	13	(Philippines)	Jayjay Helterbrand	6 ft 0 in (1.83 m)			Kentucky State
C	14	(Philippines)	Aramis Calpito	6 ft 5 in (1.96 m)			San Sebastian
C	18	(Philippines)	Wilmer Ong	6 ft 4 in (1.93 m)			USLS
C	31	(Philippines)	Marlon Basco	6 ft 6 in (1.98 m)
F	33	(Philippines)	Teodoro Valera	6 ft 2 in (1.88 m)			UST
F	35	(Philippines)	Marlon Piodo	6 ft 5 in (1.96 m)			USJ–R
C	43	(United States)	Alex Crisano	6 ft 7 in (2.01 m)			Brooklyn
F	44	(Philippines)	Ronald Magtulis	6 ft 3 in (1.91 m)			Far Eastern
G	47	(Philippines)	Mark Caguioa	6 ft 0 in (1.83 m)			Glendale CC (CA)

Head coach

- (Philippines) Allan Caidic

Assistant coach(es)

- (Philippines) Cris Calilan

Legend

- (C) Team captain
- (CI) Commissioner's Cup Import
- (GI) Governors' Cup Import
- (EI) EASL Import
- (DP) Unsigned draft pick
- (FA) Free agent
- (IN) Inactive
- (S) Suspended
- (R) Rookie
- Injured

== Broadcast notes ==
Game	Play-by-play	Analyst	Courtside Reporters, Pre-Game and Halftime Hosts
Game 1	Noli Eala	Andy Jao and Ron Jacobs	Paolo Trillo and Jannelle So
Game 2	Chino Trinidad	Yeng Guiao	Paolo Trillo and Chiqui Roa-Puno
Game 3	Anthony Suntay	Quinito Henson	
Game 4	Noli Eala	Tommy Manotoc	Anthony Suntay, Chiqui Roa-Puno and Ronnie Nathanielsz
Game 5	Ed Picson	Quinito Henson	
Game 6	Noli Eala	TJ Manotoc	Anthony Suntay, Jannelle So and Ronnie Nathanielsz
