= Freddie Abuda =

Filipino basketball player and coach

Personal information
- Born: October 8, 1969 (age 57) Lawaan, Eastern Samar, Philippines
- Listed height: 6 ft 3 in (1.91 m)
- Listed weight: 200 lb (91 kg)

Career information
- College: UC
- PBA draft: 1993: 2nd round, 14th overall pick
- Drafted by: Coney Island Ice Cream Stars
- Playing career: 1993–2004
- Position: Power forward / center
- Coaching career: 2006–2023

Career history

Playing
- 1993–1994: Coney Island/Purefoods
- 1994–2001: San Miguel Beermen
- 2002–2004: Coca-Cola Tigers

Coaching
- 2006–2014: San Beda (assistant)
- 2008–2011: San Miguel/Petron (assistant)
- 2011–2023: Barangay Ginebra (assistant)
- 2014–2016: De La Salle (assistant)

Career highlights
- As player: 8× PBA champion (1993 All-Filipino, 1999 Commissioner's, 1999 Governors', 2000 Commissioner's, 2000 Governors', 2001 All-Filipino, 2002 All-Filipino, 2003 Reinforced); 2× PBA Defensive Player of the Year (1997, 2000); 4× PBA All-Defensive Team (1997, 1998, 1999, 2000); 3× PBA Sportsmanship Award (1997, 1998, 2000); As assistant coach: 9× PBA champion (2009 Fiesta, 2011 Governors', 2016 Governors', 2017 Governors', 2018 Commissioner's, 2019 Governors', 2020 Philippine, 2021 Governors', 2022–23 Commissioner's); 7× NCAA seniors' champion (2006, 2007, 2008, 2010, 2011 2012, 2013)

Freddie Abuda (born October 8, 1969) is a Filipino former basketball player and assistant coach. Abuda gained the moniker The Scavenger as a large proportion of his points were the result of his scoring on a follow-up after rebounding a teammate's missed shot while playing in the Philippine Basketball Association (PBA).

== Career ==
=== Playing ===
He began his career as a reserve player for Purefoods and was later traded to San Miguel Beer where he developed into an important role player. His tough defensive and solid rebounding skills contributed to San Miguel Beer gaining multiple championships.

=== Coaching ===
He served as an assistant coach to the San Beda Red Lions of the NCAA, De La Salle Green Archers, and Barangay Ginebra San Miguel of the PBA. Abuda retired in Ginebra coaching staff in 2023 to move overseas.

== Personal life ==
His son, Franz, was drafted 45th overall by the Barangay Ginebra San Miguel during the PBA season 48 draft.
