= Manotoc =

Manotoc is a surname. Notable people with the surname include:

- Imee Marcos-Manotoc, Filipino politician and film producer
- Matthew Manotoc, Filipino politician and athlete
- TJ Manotoc, Filipino sports TV personality, sportscaster and sports journalist
- Tommy Manotoc, Filipino golfer and basketball coach
