= PBA Best Player of the Conference award =

Philippine Basketball Association award

The Philippine Basketball Association's Best Player of the Conference Award is given to the best local (Filipino or part-Filipino) player at the end of each conference (tournament). It was first awarded in the 1994 All-Filipino Conference.

The Best Import Award is given to the best player (non-Filipino) at the end of each import-laden conference.

== Criteria ==
The method of selecting the Best Player of the Conference is similar on how the season's Most Valuable Player is selected. The criteria used since the 2022–23 PBA season are as follows:

- 45% average statistical points
- 30% press and media votes
- 25% players' votes

Statistical points (SP) are computed as follows:

- 1 SP for every point scored, rebound, assist, steal and blocked shot.
- 10 bonus points for every game won where the player played up to the semifinals.
- 15 bonus points for every game won where the player played in the Finals
- Deduction of 1 SP for every turnover, 5 SP for every technical or flagrant foul without ejection, and 15 SP for any technical or flagrant foul that results in an ejection.

In addition, a Filipino player can only be eligible for awards if he played in at least 70% of his team's games.

== Winners ==
| ^ | Denotes player who is still active in the PBA |
| * | Inducted into the PBA Hall of Fame |
| Player (X) | Denotes the number of times the player has been named BPC |
| Team (X) | Denotes the number of times a player from this team has won |
| **Player** **(in bold text)** | Indicates the player who won the PBA Most Valuable Player in the same season |

| Season | Conference | Best Player | Team | Ref. |
|---|---|---|---|---|
| 1994 | All-Filipino | Jerry Codiñera | Coney Island Ice Cream Stars | |
| 1994 | Commissioner's | **Alvin Patrimonio*** | Purefoods Tender Juicy Hotdogs (2) | |
| 1994 | Governors' | Vergel Meneses | Swift Mighty Meaty Hotdogs | |
| 1995 | All-Filipino | **Vergel Meneses** (2) | Sunkist Orange Juicers (2) | |
| 1995 | Commissioner's | **Vergel Meneses** (3) | Sunkist Orange Juicers (3) | |
| 1995 | Governors' | Allan Caidic* | San Miguel Beermen | |
| 1996 | All-Filipino | Alvin Patrimonio* (2) | Purefoods Tender Juicy Hotdogs (3) | |
| 1996 | Commissioner's | Bong Hawkins | Alaska Milkmen | |
| 1996 | Governors' | Marlou Aquino | Ginebra San Miguel | |
| 1997 | All-Filipino | Nelson Asaytono | San Miguel Beermen (2) | |
| 1997 | Commissioner's | Johnny Abarrientos | Alaska Milkmen (2) | |
| 1997 | Governors' | **Alvin Patrimonio*** (3) | Purefoods Carne Norte Beefies (4) | |
| 1998 | All-Filipino | Nelson Asaytono (2) | San Miguel Beermen (3) | |
| 1998 | Commissioner's | **Kenneth Duremdes** | Alaska Milkmen (3) | |
| 1998 | Governors' | Jerry Codiñera (2) | Purefoods Tender Juicy Hotdogs (5) | |
| 1999 | All-Filipino | Eric Menk | Tanduay Gold Rhum Masters | |
| 1999 | Commissioner's | **Benjie Paras*** | Formula Shell Zoom Masters | |
| 1999 | Governors' | Danny Seigle | San Miguel Beermen (4) | |
| 2000 | All-Filipino | Kenneth Duremdes (2) | Alaska Milkmen (4) | |
| 2000 | Commissioner's | **Danny Ildefonso** | San Miguel Beermen (5) | |
| 2000 | Governors' | **Danny Ildefonso** (2) | San Miguel Beermen (6) | |
| 2001 | All-Filipino | **Danny Ildefonso** (3) | San Miguel Beermen (7) | |
| 2001 | Commissioner's | **Danny Ildefonso** (4) | San Miguel Beermen (8) | |
| 2001 | Governors' | **Danny Ildefonso** (5) | San Miguel Beermen (9) | |
| 2002 | Governors' | Rey Evangelista | Purefoods Tender Juicy Hotdogs (6) | |
| 2002 | Commissioner's | Davonn Harp | Red Bull Thunder | |
| 2002 | All-Filipino | Jeffrey Cariaso | Coca-Cola Tigers | |
| 2003 | All-Filipino | **Asi Taulava** | Talk 'N Text Phone Pals | |
| 2003 | Invitational | Ali Peek | Alaska Aces (5) | |
| 2003 | Reinforced | Rudy Hatfield | Coca-Cola Tigers (2) | |
| 2004 | Fiesta | Eric Menk (2) | Barangay Ginebra Kings (2) | |
| 2004–05 | Philippine | **Eric Menk** (3) | Barangay Ginebra Kings (3) | |
| 2004–05 | Fiesta | Willie Miller | Talk 'N Text Phone Pals (2) | |
| 2005–06 | Fiesta | Enrico Villanueva | Red Bull Barako (2) | |
| 2005–06 | Philippine | Danny Seigle (2) | San Miguel Beermen (10) | |
| 2006–07 | Philippine | Mark Caguioa | Barangay Ginebra Kings (4) | |
| 2006–07 | Fiesta | Mark Cardona | Talk 'N Text Phone Pals (3) | |
| 2007–08 | Philippine | **Kelly Williams**^ | Sta. Lucia Realtors | |
| 2007–08 | Fiesta | Jayjay Helterbrand | Barangay Ginebra Kings (5) | |
| 2008–09 | Philippine | Willie Miller (2) | Alaska Aces (6) | |
| 2008–09 | Fiesta | **Jayjay Helterbrand** (2) | Barangay Ginebra Kings (6) | |
| 2009–10 | Philippine | **James Yap** | Purefoods Tender Juicy Giants (7) | |
| 2009–10 | Fiesta | Jay Washington | San Miguel Beermen (11) | |
| 2010–11 | Philippine | Jay Washington (2) | San Miguel Beermen (12) | |
| 2010–11 | Commissioner's | **Jimmy Alapag** | Talk 'N Text Tropang Texters (4) | |
| 2010–11 | Governors' | Arwind Santos | Petron Blaze Boosters (13) | |
| 2011–12 | Philippine | Gary David | Powerade Tigers (3) | |
| 2011–12 | Commissioner's | **Mark Caguioa** (2) | Barangay Ginebra Kings (7) | |
| 2011–12 | Governors' | **Mark Caguioa** (3) | Barangay Ginebra Kings (8) | |
| 2012–13 | Philippine | Jayson Castro^ | Talk 'N Text Tropang Texters (5) | |
| 2012–13 | Commissioner's | LA Tenorio^ | Barangay Ginebra San Miguel (9) | |
| 2012–13 | Governors' | **Arwind Santos** (2) | Petron Blaze Boosters (14) | |
| 2013–14 | Philippine | **June Mar Fajardo**^ | Petron Blaze Boosters (15) | |
| 2013–14 | Commissioner's | Jayson Castro^ (2) | Talk 'N Text Tropang Texters (6) | |
| 2013–14 | Governors' | Ranidel de Ocampo | Talk 'N Text Tropang Texters (7) | |
| 2014–15 | Philippine | **June Mar Fajardo**^ (2) | San Miguel Beermen (16) | |
| 2014–15 | Commissioner's | Jayson Castro^ (3) | Talk 'N Text Tropang Texters (8) | |
| 2014–15 | Governors' | **June Mar Fajardo**^ (3) | San Miguel Beermen (17) | |
| 2015–16 | Philippine | **June Mar Fajardo**^ (4) | San Miguel Beermen (18) | |
| 2015–16 | Commissioner's | Calvin Abueva^ | Alaska Aces (7) | |
| 2015–16 | Governors' | Jayson Castro^ (4) | TNT KaTropa (9) | |
| 2016–17 | Philippine | **June Mar Fajardo**^ (5) | San Miguel Beermen (19) | |
| 2016–17 | Commissioner's | Chris Ross^ | San Miguel Beermen (20) | |
| 2016–17 | Governors' | Greg Slaughter | Barangay Ginebra San Miguel (10) | |
| 2017–18 | Philippine | **June Mar Fajardo**^ (6) | San Miguel Beermen (21) | |
| 2017–18 | Commissioner's | **June Mar Fajardo**^ (7) | San Miguel Beermen (22) | |
| 2017–18 | Governors' | Paul Lee^ | Magnolia Hotshots Pambansang Manok (8) | |
| 2019 | Philippine | **June Mar Fajardo**^ (8) | San Miguel Beermen (23) | |
| 2019 | Commissioner's | Jayson Castro^ (5) | TNT KaTropa (10) | |
| 2019 | Governors' | Christian Standhardinger | NorthPort Batang Pier | |
| 2020 | Philippine | Stanley Pringle^ | Barangay Ginebra San Miguel (11) | |
| 2021 | Philippine | Calvin Abueva^ (2) | Magnolia Pambansang Manok Hotshots (9) | |
| 2021 | Governors' | **Scottie Thompson**^ | Barangay Ginebra San Miguel (12) | |
| 2022–23 | Philippine | **June Mar Fajardo**^ (9) | San Miguel Beermen (24) | |
| 2022–23 | Commissioner's | Scottie Thompson^ (2) | Barangay Ginebra San Miguel (13) | |
| 2022–23 | Governors' | Christian Standhardinger (2) | Barangay Ginebra San Miguel (14) | |
| 2023–24 | Commissioner's | CJ Perez^ | San Miguel Beermen (25) | |
| 2023–24 | Philippine | **June Mar Fajardo**^ (10) | San Miguel Beermen (26) | |
| 2024–25 | Governors' | **June Mar Fajardo**^ (11) | San Miguel Beermen (27) | |
| 2024–25 | Commissioner's | Arvin Tolentino | NorthPort Batang Pier (2) | |
| 2024–25 | Philippine | **June Mar Fajardo**^ (12) | San Miguel Beermen (28) | |
| 2025–26 | Philippine | June Mar Fajardo^ (13) | San Miguel Beermen (29) | |
| 2025–26 | Commissioner's | RJ Abarrientos^ | Barangay Ginebra San Miguel (15) | |

== Multiple-time winners ==
| Total | Player |
|---|---|
| 13 | June Mar Fajardo |
| 5 | Jayson Castro |
| 5 | Danny Ildefonso |
| 3 | Mark Caguioa |
| 3 | Vergel Meneses |
| 3 | Eric Menk |
| 3 | Alvin Patrimonio |
| 2 | Calvin Abueva |
| 2 | Nelson Asaytono |
| 2 | Jerry Codiñera |
| 2 | Kenneth Duremdes |
| 2 | Jayjay Helterbrand |
| 2 | Willie Miller |
| 2 | Arwind Santos |
| 2 | Danny Seigle |
| 2 | Christian Standhardinger |
| 2 | Scottie Thompson |
| 2 | Jay Washington |
