= Danny Ildefonso =

Filipino basketball player (born 1976)

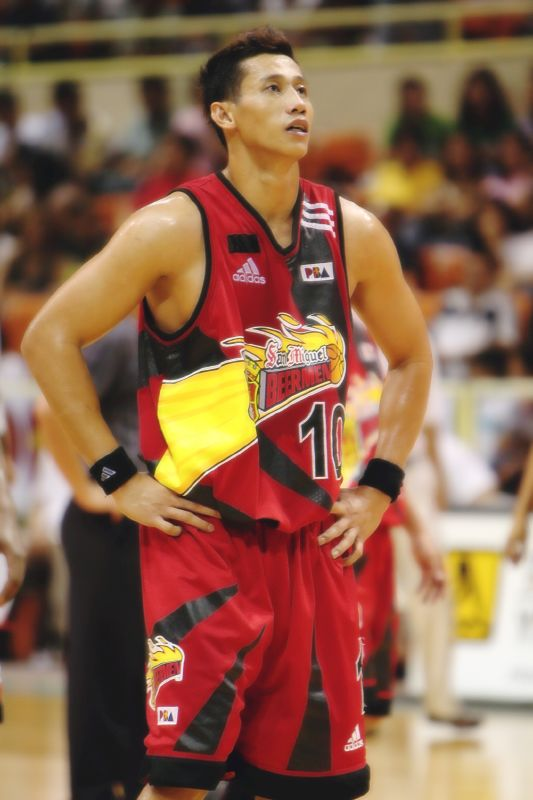
- Ildefonso in 2007

Converge FiberXers
- Title: Assistant coach
- League: PBA

Personal information
- Born: December 9, 1976 (age 49) Urdaneta, Pangasinan, Philippines
- Listed height: 6 ft 6 in (1.98 m)
- Listed weight: 230 lb (104 kg)

Career information
- College: NU
- PBA draft: 1998: 1st round1st overall
- Drafted by: Formula Shell
- Playing career: 1998–2015, 2023
- Position: Power forward / center
- Number: 10
- Coaching career: 2016–present

Career history

Playing
- 1998–2013: San Miguel Beermen / Petron Blaze Boosters
- 2013–2015: Meralco Bolts
- 2023: Converge FiberXers

Coaching
- 2016–2017: Ateneo HS (assistant)
- 2017–present: NU (assistant)
- 2017–2022: Alaska Aces (assistant)
- 2022–present: Converge FiberXers (assistant)

Career highlights
- as player: 8× PBA champion (1999 Commissioner's, 1999 Governors', 2000 Commissioner's, 2000 Governors', 2001 All-Filipino, 2005 Fiesta, 2009 Fiesta, 2011 Governors'); 3× PBA Finals Most Valuable Player (1999 Governors', 2000 Commissioner's, 2005 Fiesta); 2× PBA Most Valuable Player (2000, 2001); 5× PBA Best Player of the Conference (2000 Commissioner's, 2000 Governors', 2001 All-Filipino, 2001 Commissioner's, 2001 Governors'); 8× PBA All-Star (1999–2001, 2003–2005, 2007, 2009); PBA All-Star MVP (2001); 2× PBA Mythical First Team (2000, 2001); 3× PBA Mythical Second Team (1998, 1999, 2007); PBA Rookie of the Year (1998); PBA Comeback Player of the Year (2011); 50 Greatest Players in PBA History (2015 selection); PBL's 20 Greatest Players; as assistant coach: AsiaBasket champion (2024 International)

Danilo Cabonitalla Ildefonso (born December 9, 1976) is a Filipino former professional basketball player. He currently serves as an assistant coach for both the Converge FiberXers of the Philippine Basketball Association (PBA) and the NU Bulldogs of the UAAP. Nicknamed "Danny I", "The Demolition Man" and "Lakáy", Ildefonso was awarded PBA Most Valuable Player in 2000 and 2001, being one of four players to do so in back-to-back seasons (along with Bogs Adornado, Alvin Patrimonio, and June Mar Fajardo). He is also one of the few PBA players to have won all three major MVP awards in the league: regular season, finals, and all-star game MVP. He was picked 1st overall in the 1998 PBA draft and the 2014 PBA Expansion Draft, becoming the only player in the PBA to be drafted first-overall two times and being drafted first-overall in the draft and the expansion draft.

Ildefonso played amateur basketball for the National University Bulldogs in the UAAP and for AGFA in the Philippine Basketball League and a member of the Philippine national basketball team on several occasions. He started his PBA career in 1998, when he was drafted by Formula Shell. In 2013, after 15 years with San Miguel, he was waived by the team and then joined the Meralco Bolts in the same year. He spent one season with Meralco before being released to the 2014 Expansion Draft. However, Blackwater Elite who drafted him, did not sign him because of contract problems, stating that Ildefonso is expecting too much salary on the team. Ildefonso defended himself stating that his wage with the team is very low. In late 2014, Ildefonso returned to Meralco. He then retired from playing basketball in 2015, but made a brief return in 2023 for Converge.

== Early life ==
Ildefonso was raised by farmers. He wanted to become a basketball player after seeing a UAAP game on television. His father was against it at first, as basketball made him neglect the carabaos they took care of. He grew to 6'2" and started playing as an "import" in different leagues in Pangasinan.

== Amateur career ==
Ildefonso was discovered after suiting up for his native Pangasinan in the Palarong Pambansa. He represented the Ilocos Region during the 1992 and 1993 Palarong Pambansa. An older friend of his, who was a student at National University, offered to bring him and his older brother Bobby to Manila. He got a spot on the NU Bulldogs, and a free education. It was at NU where he got the nickname "Lakáy", meaning "old man".

Ildefonso played for the NU Bulldogs in the UAAP from 1995 to 1997, teaming up with fellow Pangasinense and later-AGFA and San Miguel teammate Lordy Tugade, leading the Bulldogs to respectable finishes but never winning a UAAP championship together. He did not play out his final year with the Bulldogs to turn pro.

He later played for AGFA in the Philippine Basketball League but had a difficult time leading the Photokina franchise to the title, losing to Tanduay in championship matches. Still, the PBL recognized him as one of their 20 Greatest Players years later.

He was regarded as the second-best big man of his class behind Rommel Adducul, and was highly sought after. One of the people interested in him was then-SMB coach Ron Jacobs, who encouraged him to enter the PBA draft. However, he had just signed with the now-defunct Pangasinan Presidents of the Metropolitan Basketball Association (MBA), who were coached by Dong Vergeire, his coach on the national team. He also had a live three-year contract with AGFA.

== Professional career ==
=== San Miguel Beermen/Petron Blaze Boosters (1998–2013) ===
==== Early years (1998–99) ====
After a successful amateur career, Ildefonso applied for the PBA draft despite being underage. This prompted the PBA to change their age limit rules that applicants must at least be 23 years old.

Ildefonso was eventually drafted first-pick overall by Formula Shell in the 1998 PBA draft, but was traded to the San Miguel Beermen (SMB) for the Beermen's second overall pick, Noy Castillo, and cash. The San Miguel Corporation franchise wanted the promising youngster in their ranks to be the future cornerstone of the team and this forced them to buy out his MBA contract in a "direct deal".

In his debut, Ildefonso scored 18 points in a win over the Pop Cola 800s. In his rookie season, he became one of the key players for the Beermen alongside Nelson Asaytono, leading the Beermen to two runner-up finish in the All-Filipino and Commissioner's Cup, losing to the Alaska Aces on both occasions. At season's end, he won the Rookie of the Year honors while averaging 11.6 ppg in 74 games which led all rookies in 1998.

The next season, with the departure of Asaytono and the arrival of Filipino-American rookie Danny Seigle and the performances of imports Terquin Mott and Lamont Strothers, San Miguel won two titles in the 1999 Commissioner's Cup and Governors' Cup, ending a five-year title drought.

==== Back-to-back MVP awards (2000–01) ====
In 2000, Ildefonso and Seigle would again lead San Miguel to two titles, retaining the Commissioner's and Governors' Cup championships. Ildefonso won two of his five straight Best Player of the Conference honors, got Finals MVP during the Commissioner's Cup, and defeated Kenneth Duremdes to win the Most Valuable Player Award.

Before the start of the 2001 season, Ildefonso was offered a ₱96 million, 16-year deal with multiple bonuses to join the Tanduay Rhum Masters, the biggest offer in league history. However, the PBA Commissioner's Office voided the deal, and asked Tanduay to restructure the deal. Tanduay withdrew the deal instead. Without a contract, he started the season as a free agent. He eventually signed a one-year extension with San Miguel. Following this, the PBA made amendments to its salary cap rules, such as shortening contracts and limiting bonuses.

San Miguel then defeated sister team Barangay Ginebra Kings, 4–2 to win the 2001 All-Filipino Cup. He scored a career-high 32 points in Game 3 of the All-Filipino Cup finals. Despite losses to Red Bull and Sta. Lucia in the Commissioner's Cup and Governors' Cup finals series, Ildefonso went on to sweep the season's Best Player of the Conference honors, making him the only player to win five consecutive Best Player of the Conference honors. He also won his second Most Valuable Player Award, joining Bogs Adornado and Alvin Patrimonio as the only players to win the said award on back-to-back seasons, as well as the youngest to win two straight. He also won the All-Star Game MVP honors for the victorious Veterans team. With this feature, he became one of the rare players to have won all three major MVP awards in the league: regular season MVP, All-star Game MVP, and Finals MVP.

==== Injury plagued seasons (2002–07) ====
In 2002, Ildefonso temporarily left San Miguel to join the Philippine national team for the 2002 Asian Games in Busan. He missed the Governors' Cup, where the Beermen finished with a 5–6 record, but upset the Talk 'N Text Phone Pals to make it to the semis. He returned to the Beermen in the All-Filipino Cup but the Beermen placed only third in that tournament as he was recuperating from a foot injury.

Ildefonso would play inconsistent games as well as missing several games due to injuries in the 2003 season and the early parts of the 2004–05 season. Due to injury, he wasn't able to play in the 2004 All-Star Game. Still, he re-signed with the team for 14.7 million pesos for the next three and a half years. San Miguel also made the finals during the 2003 Reinforced Conference during which he and Coca-Cola Tigers' import Tee McClary were suspended for one game for an altercation.

During the 2005 Fiesta Conference, the Beermen made it to the semifinals against Red Bull. Ildefonso played one of his best games of the tournament, and hit numerous clutch shots throughout the tournament, including a series-clinching game-winning fade away over the outstretched arms of Red Bull import Earl Barron to lead San Miguel to the finals against Talk 'N Text. In the championship series, he once again put up another impressive performance for San Miguel, leading them to their first title since 2001 and defeating the Phone Pals, 4–1. During the series, Ildefonso made a game-winning layup in game 2 against Asi Taulava and in Game 5, a running jumper that put San Miguel in the lead for good to clinch the series. Ildefonso was named Finals MVP.

Ildefonso was an All-Star once again in 2006, leading the North All-Stars in scoring in a loss to the South.

Ildefonso started the 2006–07 season on the injury list due to an ankle injury he suffered the previous conference. He made his season debut in a win over the Air21 Express. That season, he started coming off the bench, helping the Beermen get into the semis of the Philippine Cup. He was then fined 5,000 pesos by the league after two technical fouls during Game 3 of the semis. After a first technical foul after a verbal exchange with Mick Pennisi, he was ejected in the fourth quarter during a face-to-face verbal exchange with Enrico Villanueva. However he had a bruised tendon during the season. They still made it to the finals, where they lost to Ginebra, 4–2. He made the PBA Mythical Second Team and was an All-Star as well that season.

==== Ups and downs (2008–11) ====
Bothered by injuries, Ildefonso missed much of the 2008–09 season. Despite this, in April 2009, he was voted to play as a starter for the North squad in the PBA All-Star Game. However, the former two-time MVP did not play in the All Star Game, as PBA commissioner Sonny Barrios accepted his request to be with his six-year-old daughter who was scheduled for chemotherapy treatment on the same day. He returned from his injuries against the Rain or Shine Elasto Painters. He was able to help the team make the Fiesta Conference finals. San Miguel went on to win the title, 4–2, overcoming a 2–1 deficit.

Ildefonso missed several games of the 2009–10 season due to a knee injury. A doctor in the US told him that the injury was career-ending. Still, he sought other doctors' opinions and underwent strengthening and conditioning exercises to get back to playing. When healthy, Ildefonso and Seigle were often on the bench. They still had moments where they were able to contribute, such as when they helped SMB secure third place in the 2010 Philippine Cup, and when SMB made the 2010 Fiesta Conference finals.

During the 2010–11 season, SMB (now known as the Petron Blaze Boosters) made it to the 2010–11 Philippine Cup finals. Although they lost that finals, they also reached the finals during the 2011 Governors' Cup after a bad record during the 2011 Commissioner's Cup. Ildefonso hit a game-winning buzzer beater in Game 1 against Talk 'N Text in a come from behind win, 89–88. Despite having injuries to four key players, Petron defeated the heavily favored Talk 'N Text for the Governor's Cup championship, slamming the Texters' bid for a Grand Slam. He was awarded the Comeback Player award that season.

On January 11, 2012, in a semifinal game against Talk 'N Text, Ildefonso scored a season high 22 points after going 11 of 14 from the field, including a baseline spinner that gave them an 81–80 lead entering the final two minutes. Petron ultimately defeated Talk N' Text 85–82, to take a 3–1 lead in the semifinals of the Philippine Cup. Although Petron lost the series 4–3, he still played an important role for his team.

==== Final season with Petron (2012–13) ====
During the 2012–13 season, Ildefonso played limited minutes and mostly came off the bench. He averaged 1.29 points, 6.93 minutes and 1.57 rebounds in only 14 games, among his lowest averages in the PBA. In his final season with the franchise, he played an important role by mentoring Petron's 2012 top draft pick June Mar Fajardo, to improve the latter's performances and rebounding. They had previously met in 2007 at a charity basketball game in Cebu. He also underwent surgery for his shoulder. He could only watch as Petron lost in the 2013 Governors' Cup finals to the San Mig Coffee Mixers.

=== Meralco Bolts (2013–2014) ===
When the 38th season ended, for the first time since he was acquired by San Miguel Corp.'s flagship franchise from Shell in a draft-day trade in 1998, Ildefonso's name was conspicuously missing from the team's official roster. Team sources revealed Ildefonso had been released by Petron after 15 years of playing for his mother team.

After missing the early games of the 2013–2014 season, Ildefonso was signed by the Meralco Bolts to a one-conference contract for the Philippine Cup. When asked upon the two-time MVP's arrival, head coach Ryan Gregorio said: “I honestly believe that DI still has what it takes to compete at a high level in the PBA. He has been aching for teams to give him a venue to display what he has and we are more than willing to provide him with the opportunity. He has championship experience and high basketball intelligence; things that you cannot teach as a basketball coach, but, you learn through time as a basketball player".

Ildefonso made his debut for Meralco on January 4, 2014, playing 29 minutes and scoring 14 points to help his team win 92–88 in overtime over the Air21 Express and stopping a 4-game losing streak. He also got to play against his former team and matchup against his former protégé Fajardo in a loss to Petron. His contract was extended for the rest of the season.

At the end of the 2013–2014 season, Ildefonso became an "unprotected" player and Meralco decided to release him to the 2014 Expansion Draft.

=== Blackwater Elite and return to Meralco Bolts (2014–2015) ===
Ildefonso was eventually drafted by debuting expansion team Blackwater Elite as first pick overall, making him the only player to be drafted first overall two times after being drafted first overall in the 1998 draft and the expansion draft. At the start of the 2014–15 season, however, Blackwater did not sign him because of contract problems, stating that Ildefonso was expecting too much salary on the team. The veteran player defended himself stating that his wage with the team is very low.

In late 2014, Ildefonso rejoined Meralco. The two-time MVP made his PBA return on October 28, 2014, in an 83–75 win against Blackwater, the team that released him a few weeks earlier. This made his 17th season in the league official.

On August 23, 2015, he formally announced his retirement to give way for Meralco to rebuild their frontline.

=== Brief comeback with the Converge FiberXers ===
On March 2, 2023, while being an assistant coach for the Converge FiberXers, Ildefonso was activated as their 15th local player in the lineup, thus confirming his official comeback in the PBA. He played his debut for the team on March 3, playing four minutes and recording one rebound.

== National team career ==
Ildefonso first joined the under-18 national team in 1995, helping the team place sixth in the ABC Under-18 Championship. He then led the Philippines to a gold medal in the 1997 Southeast Asian Games alongside Rommel Adducul, Ralph Rivera, and coach Dong Vergeire. They had also finished in ninth place during the 1997 ABC Championship earlier that year. He also joined the team for the 1998 SEABA tournament.

In 2002, Ildefonso joined the team for the 2002 Asian Games in Busan, but struggled throughout the Asiad, mainly due to his role of playing small forward, instead of his natural position of power forward. The Nationals ended up in fourth place after losing a heartbreaking semis matchup against South Korea.

== PBA career statistics ==
Legend
GP	Games played	MPG	Minutes per game
FG%	Field-goal percentage	3P%	3-point field-goal percentage	FT%	Free-throw percentage
RPG	Rebounds per game	APG	Assists per game	SPG	Steals per game
BPG	Blocks per game	PPG	Points per game	**Bold**	Career high

As of the end of 2022–23 season

=== Season-by-season averages ===
Year	Team	GP	MPG	FG%	3P%	FT%	RPG	APG	SPG	BPG	PPG
1998	San Miguel	**74**	32.8	.497	.222	.700	5.0	1.6	.2	1.0	11.7
1999	San Miguel	55	41.7	.481	.125	.725	**8.8**	2.0	.5	**1.2**	12.9
2000	San Miguel	55	38.8	.482	.154	**.744**	**8.8**	3.2	.4	.8	**15.2**
2001	San Miguel	70	**42.2**	.433	.222	.675	8.6	**4.5**	.7	.9	14.7
2002	San Miguel	12	35.3	.472	.417	.639	7.8	4.2	.5	.5	12.3
2003	San Miguel	36	29.8	.470	.250	.715	6.4	2.4	**1.0**	1.1	13.0
2004–05	San Miguel	65	29.9	.479	.143	.660	7.0	2.4	**1.0**	.7	12.7
2005–06	San Miguel	44	32.4	.434	.250	.656	6.4	3.1	.6	.8	12.1
2006–07	San Miguel	48	28.0	.475	.000	.651	6.6	2.3	.7	.7	12.4
2007–08	Magnolia	40	25.2	.452	.158	.690	4.8	1.9	.9	.5	9.7
2008–09	San Miguel	19	21.6	.436	.000	.642	4.5	1.4	.5	.3	10.4
2009–10	San Miguel	39	17.0	.449	**.500**	.673	3.2	1.0	.3	.4	6.9
2010–11	San Miguel / Petron	48	23.2	**.508**	.143	.549	4.9	2.3	.6	.5	7.5
2011–12	Petron	40	22.4	.488	.154	.524	5.1	2.1	.7	.6	8.1
2012–13	Petron	14	6.9	.310	—	.000	1.6	0.6	.1	.4	1.3
2013–14	Meralco	21	12.3	.389	—	.692	2.2	1.0	.4	.4	3.1
2014–15	Meralco	34	9.6	.382	.000	.529	1.3	.6	.2	.1	2.3
2022–23	Converge	1	4.3	.000	—	—	1.0	.0	.0	.0	.0
Career		715	29.2	.466	.198	.674	6.0	2.3	0.6	0.7	10.8

== Coaching career ==
Ildefonso got his start in coaching for the Ateneo High School basketball team, developing their big men. In 2017, he joined the coaching staff of his alma mater NU, and even got to be the acting head coach for one game after Jamike Jarin was suspended. He also joined the coaching staff of the Alaska Aces that year. He stayed with the team until they became the Converge FiberXers.

On August 28, 2024, Danny was fined ₱20,000 by commissioner Willie Marcial after specifically mentioning "farm team" in a Facebook discussion about his son Dave Ildefonso's contract situation with the NorthPort Batang Pier.

== Political career ==
Ildefonso served as the barangay captain in his hometown of Barangay Cabuloan in Urdaneta City. He ran for councilor of Urdaneta, Pangasinan in the 2025 Philippine general election, but did not win enough votes.

== Personal life ==
Ildefonso's family consists of his wife Ren, with their two sons and three daughters. Their sons Shaun and Dave were both drafted into the PBA. Their daughter Pia went on to play in the Premier Volleyball League after surviving cancer, and their twin daughters Sym and Sam are also amateur volleyball players. They raised them as Christians. Ildefonso is also the uncle of BJ Andrade, who he helped get into Ateneo and got to coach at Converge.

After retiring, Ildefonso became a businessman. These include owning a Petron gas station and a chicken farm. He also founded the Lakay Danny Ildefonso Developmental League, which features players at the age of 14 and under from his home province of Pangasinan.

Ildefonso's life story, from his struggles with poverty in his younger years to his rise to basketball superstardom, were dramatized on Maalaala Mo Kaya in 2004, where he was portrayed by Victor Neri.
