= PBA Commissioner's Cup =

Philippine Basketball Association conference

- Most recent season or competition: 2026 PBA Commissioner's Cup
- The PBA Commissioner's Cup trophy won by the Alaska Aces in 2013.
- Founded: 1993; 33 years ago
- First season: 1993
- Most recent champion: Barangay Ginebra San Miguel (4th title) (2026)

The PBA Commissioner's Cup is one of three active conferences in the Philippine Basketball Association (PBA). It is also one of two conferences, the other being the Governors' Cup which allows teams to hire a single foreign player, known as an "import". The Commissioner's Cup also refers to the trophy awarded to the champion team.

The first run of the Commissioner's Cup lasted from 1993 to 2002. In 2003, it was replaced by the returning Invitational Championship, and from 2004 to 2010, the Fiesta Conference was held as the lone import-laden conference. The conference was then reinstated 2011 when the league reverted back to a three-conference format.

The Barangay Ginebra San Miguel are the current defending Commissioner's Cup champions, winning the 2026 PBA Commissioner's Cup. The San Miguel Beermen have won the most Commissioner's Cup titles with five.

== History ==
=== 1993–1998 ===
During the 1993 PBA season, the league moved the All-Filipino Conference as the first tournament of the season and made the Second Conference as the Commissioner's Cup, a reference to the PBA Commissioner. The conference was the second tournament held in a PBA season.

The Swift/Sunkist franchise won the tournament in 1993 and 1995. Purefoods, with Kenny Redfield as import and Chot Reyes as head coach, defeated Alaska in 1994.

During Alaska's grandslam season of 1996, they won the Commissioners Cup title over Shell in a grueling seven-game series. The Gordon's Gin Boars ended their six-year drought, winning over the Milkmen in 1997, giving playing coach Robert Jaworski his last PBA title on both capacities. A year later, Alaska had Devin Davis as import to win the title over San Miguel.

=== 1999–2002 ===
From 1999 to 2000, San Miguel won the Commissioners Cup with Terquin Mott and Stephen Howard as imports. But in 2001, the Beermen were upset by the Red Bull Thunder, with Best Import Antonio Lang in six games.

In 2002, with most of the teams' star players are with the national squad, the PBA once again allowed teams to take two imports with a combined 13 feet and six inches maximum height limit. Red Bull won the series over Talk 'N Text in seven games, its second straight. No team has won two straight Commissioner's Cups since then.

=== 2010s ===
The tournament was retired in 2003 after the re-introduction of the Invitational Championship as the second conference of the season but was eventually reactivated in 2011 after the league restored the three-conference season format. The 2011 Commissioner's Cup also saw the return of Smart Gilas, the Philippine national team, to the PBA after last playing in the 2009–10 Philippine Cup. They became the first national team to qualify for the playoffs. However, they would be defeated by the Barangay Ginebra Kings in the semifinals. The Kings would then lose to the Talk 'N Text Tropang Texters in the finals in six games.

=== 2020s ===
In 2020, the Commissioner's Cup was cancelled due to the COVID-19 pandemic. The following season saw only two conferences, the Philippine Cup and the Governors' Cup. It made its return during the 2022–23 season. In this season, the Bay Area Dragons joined the league as a guest team. Although they had they finished first in the standings in the elimination rounds, they would lose to Ginebra in the finals. For the 2023–24 season, the Commissioner's Cup was the opening tournament.

== Tournament format ==
From 1993 to 1996, the teams were divided into two groups in the group stage. The teams in the same group will play against each other once and against teams in the other group twice. After the eliminations, the top five teams will advance to a double-round robin semifinals. A playoff incentive will be given to a team that will win five of their eight semifinal games should they fail to get the top two finals berths. The top two teams (or the No. 1 team and the winner of the playoff between team with at least 5 semifinal wins and the No. 2 team) will face each other in a best-of-seven championship series.

Between from 1997 to 1999 (who has been entry of the Tanduay Rhum Masters) and again in 2001, the league adopted a quarterfinal-semifinal playoff format with the top two seeds advancing automatically to the semifinals and the next four teams will be matched up in the quarterfinals. The winners will advance to the semifinal round and to compete against the two top seeded teams in a best-of-five series. The winners of the semifinal round will then advance to the best-of-seven championship series. This format was slightly modified due to the entry of the Batang Red Bull Thunder in 2000. The top eight teams after a round-robin regular round will advance to the quarterfinals. The top two seeds will have a twice-to-beat advantage against the last two seeded teams. Other seeded teams will compete in a best-of-three playoffs. The winners will compete in a best-of-five semifinals series. Then the winners of the semifinals will advance to a best-of-seven finals series.

After the reintroduction of the tournament in 2011, the league adopted a tournament format similar on what was used in 2001. The top two teams will gain automatic semifinals seed while the next four teams will compete in a best-of-three quarterfinals.

From the 2013 edition of the tournament, the playoff format was revised and adopted the similar on what was used in 2002, in which the first two teams will gain a twice to beat advantage against the last two seeded teams and the other teams will compete for a best of three playoffs.

The height limit for import players varies from every year. In the tournament's reintroduction in 2011, the height limit was 6'4" (1.93 m). In 2012, the league removed the height restrictions. The handicapping system was reinstated in 2014, where the height limit of 6'9" (2.06 m) was imposed for the playoff teams of the previous Philippine Cup. In 2017, the limit was 6'10" (2.08 m) for all teams. The limit stayed at that height until the 2023–24 season, when the height limit was lowered to 6'9" (2.06 m).

== Trophy design ==
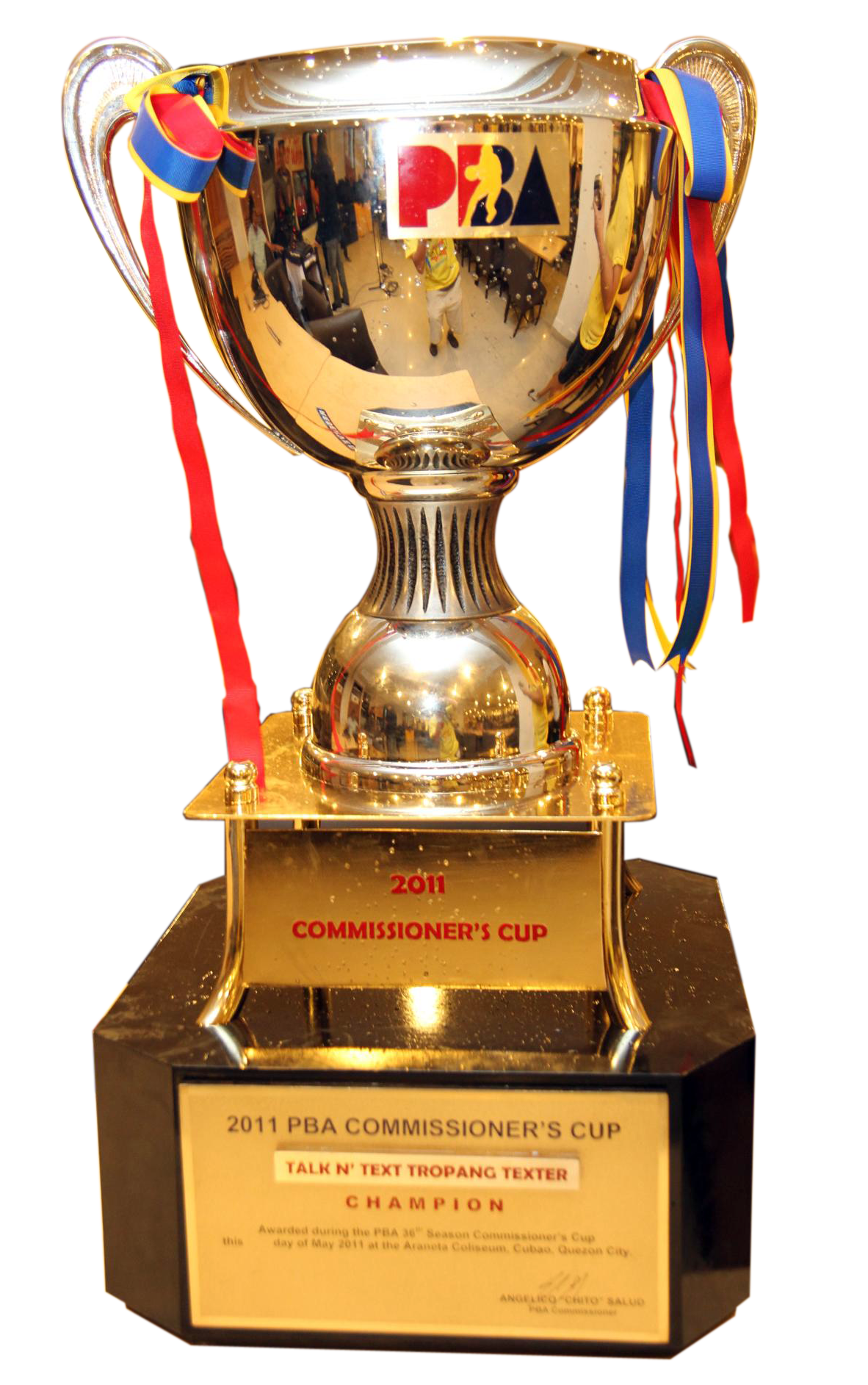
The PBA Commissioner's Cup trophy won by the Talk 'N Text Tropang Texters in 2011. This design was used from 1994 to 2002 and on 2011.

The trophy design used since the 1994 season features the Commissioner's Cup with the league logo at the front. The cup is placed in a base where the name of and the year of the tournament is engraved. Red, blue and yellow ribbons were placed in the handles of the trophy, mirroring the colors in the PBA logo. The winner keeps permanent possession of the trophy and a new one is created every year. In 2012, the trophy's cup handles were modified and the league logo was replaced with the tournament's season logo.

A prototype version of this trophy, first shown during the 1994 PBA opening ceremonies, is on display at the lobby of the PBA office in Libis, Quezon City.

== List of champions ==
=== Per season ===
Season	Champion	Runner-up	Series	Details
1993	Swift Mighty Meaty Hotdogs	Purefoods Oodles	4–2	tournament details
1994	Purefoods Tender Juicy Hotdogs	Alaska Milkmen	4–1	tournament details
1995	Sunkist Orange Juicers	Alaska Milkmen	4–2	tournament details
1996	Alaska Milkmen	Formula Shell Zoom Masters	4–3	tournament details
1997	Gordon's Gin Boars	Alaska Milkmen	4–2	tournament details
1998	Alaska Milkmen	San Miguel Beermen	4–2	tournament details
1999	San Miguel Beermen	Formula Shell Zoom Masters	4–2	tournament details
2000	San Miguel Beermen	Sta. Lucia Realtors	4–1	tournament details
2001	Red Bull Thunder	San Miguel Beermen	4–2	tournament details
2002	Red Bull Thunder	Talk N' Text Phone Pals	4–3	tournament details
2003–2010: no tournament held
2010–11	Talk 'N Text Tropang Texters	Barangay Ginebra Kings	4–2	tournament details
2011–12	B-Meg Llamados	Talk 'N Text Tropang Texters	4–3	tournament details
2012–13	Alaska Aces	Barangay Ginebra San Miguel	3–0	tournament details
2013–14	San Mig Super Coffee Mixers	Talk 'N Text Tropang Texters	3–1	tournament details
2014–15	Talk 'N Text Tropang Texters	Rain or Shine Elasto Painters	4–3	tournament details
2015–16	Rain or Shine Elasto Painters	Alaska Aces	4–2	tournament details
2016–17	San Miguel Beermen	TNT KaTropa	4–2	tournament details
2017–18	Barangay Ginebra San Miguel	San Miguel Beermen	4–2	tournament details
2019	San Miguel Beermen	TNT KaTropa	4–2	tournament details
2020–2021: Cancelled due to COVID-19 pandemic
2022–23	Barangay Ginebra San Miguel	Bay Area Dragons	4–3	tournament details
2023–24	San Miguel Beermen	Magnolia Chicken Timplados Hotshots	4–2	tournament details
2024–25	TNT Tropang Giga	Barangay Ginebra San Miguel	4–3	tournament details
2025–26	Barangay Ginebra San Miguel	TNT Tropang 5G	4–3	tournament details

=== Per franchise ===
Total	Franchise	Last championship
5	San Miguel	2023–24
4	Barangay Ginebra/Gordon's Gin	2026
3	Alaska*	2013
3	San Mig Super Coffee/B-Meg/Purefoods	2014
3	Talk 'N Text/TNT	2024–25
2	Swift/Sunkist*	1995
2	Red Bull*	2002
1	Rain or Shine	2016

* Defunct franchise

== Individual awards ==
=== Best Player of the Conference ===
^	Denotes player who is still active in the PBA
*	Inducted into the PBA Hall of Fame
Player (X)	Denotes the number of times the player has been named BPC

Season	Best Player	Team
1994	Alvin Patrimonio*	Purefoods
1995	Vergel Meneses	Sunkist
1996	Bong Hawkins	Alaska
1997	Johnny Abarrientos	Alaska
1998	Kenneth Duremdes	Alaska
1999	Benjie Paras*	Shell
2000	Danny Ildefonso	San Miguel
2001	Danny Ildefonso (2)	San Miguel
2002	Davonn Harp	Red Bull
2011	Jimmy Alapag	Talk 'N Text
2012	Mark Caguioa	Barangay Ginebra
2013	LA Tenorio^	Barangay Ginebra
2014	Jayson Castro^	Talk 'N Text
2015	Jayson Castro^ (2)	Talk 'N Text
2016	Calvin Abueva^	Alaska
2017	Chris Ross^	San Miguel
2018	June Mar Fajardo^	San Miguel
2019	Jayson Castro^ (3)	TNT
2022–23	Scottie Thompson^	Barangay Ginebra
2023–24	CJ Perez^	San Miguel
2024–25	Arvin Tolentino^	NorthPort
2026	RJ Abarrientos^	Barangay Ginebra

=== Bobby Parks Best Import award ===
Year	Best Import	Team
1993	(United States) Ronnie Thompkins	Swift
1994	(United States) Ken Redfield	Purefoods
1995	(United States) Ronnie Grandison	Sunkist
1996	(United States) Ken Redfield (2)	Shell
1997	(United States) Jeff Ward	San Miguel
1998	(United States) Devin Davis	Alaska
1999	(United States) Terquin Mott	San Miguel
2000	(United States) Ansu Sesay	Sta. Lucia
2001	(United States) Antonio Lang	Red Bull
2002	(United States) Jerald Honeycutt	Talk 'N Text
2011	(United States) Nate Brumfield	Barangay Ginebra
2012	(United States) Denzel Bowles	B-Meg
2013	(United States) Robert Dozier	Alaska
2014	(United States) Richard Howell	Talk 'N Text
2015	(United States) Wayne Chism	Rain or Shine
2016	(United States) Arinze Onuaku	Meralco
2017	(United States) Charles Rhodes	San Miguel
2018	(United States) Justin Brownlee	Barangay Ginebra
2019	(United States) Terrence Jones	TNT
2022–23	(United States) Justin Brownlee (2)	Barangay Ginebra
2023–24	(United States) Johnathan Williams	Phoenix Super LPG
2024–25	(United States) Rondae Hollis-Jefferson	TNT
2026	(United States) Justin Brownlee (3)	Barangay Ginebra
