= 2001 PBA Commissioner's Cup =

Second conference of the 2001 PBA season

- Duration: June 2 – August 24, 2001
- TV partner(s): Viva TV on IBC

Finals
- Champions: Batang Red Bull Thunder
- Runners-up: San Miguel Beermen

Awards
- Best Player: Danny Ildefonso (San Miguel Beermen)
- Best Import: Antonio Lang (Batang Red Bull Thunder)
- Finals MVP: Davonn Harp (Batang Red Bull Thunder)

PBA Commissioner's Cup chronology
- < 2000 2002 >

PBA conference chronology
- < 2001 All-Filipino 2001 Governors' >

The 2001 Philippine Basketball Association (PBA) PBA Commissioner's Cup was the second conference of the 2001 PBA season. It started on June 2 and ended on August 24, 2001. The tournament is an import-laden format, which requires an import or a pure-foreign player for each team.

== Format ==
The following format will be observed for the duration of the conference:

- One-round robin eliminations; 9 games per team; Teams are then seeded by basis on win–loss records.
- The top eight teams after the eliminations will advance to the quarterfinals.
- Quarterfinals:
  - Top four teams will have a twice-to-beat advantage against their opponent.
  - QF1: #1 vs. #8
  - QF2: #2 vs. #7
  - QF3: #3 vs. #6
  - QF4: #4 vs. #5
- Best-of-five semifinals:
  - SF1: QF1 vs. QF4
  - SF2: QF2 vs. QF3
- Third-place playoff: losers of the semifinals
- Best-of-seven finals: winners of the semifinals

== Imports ==
The following is the list of imports with the replacement imports being highlighted. GP is the number of games played in the conference.

Team	Name	GP
Alaska Aces	(United States) Terrance Badgett	8
Alaska Aces	(United States) Sean Chambers	8
Barangay Ginebra Kings	(United States) Ryan Fletcher	5
Barangay Ginebra Kings	(United States) Jerald Honeycutt	5
Batang Red Bull Thunder	(United States) Antonio Lang	21
Mobiline Phone Pals	(United States) Jerod Ward	5
Mobiline Phone Pals	(United States) Todd Bernard	6
Pop Cola Panthers	(United States) Jamie Watson	2
Pop Cola Panthers	(United States) Jason Sasser	8
Purefoods TJ Hotdogs	(United States) David Wood	16
San Miguel Beermen	(United States) Nate Johnson	21
Shell Turbo Chargers	(United States) Joaquin Hawkins	4
Shell Turbo Chargers	(United States) Tremain Wingfield	6
Sta. Lucia Realtors	(United States) Ansu Sesay	4
Sta. Lucia Realtors	(United States) Damian Owens	6
Tanduay Rhum Masters	(United States) Kevin Freeman	11

== Elimination round ==
=== Team standings ===
Pos	Team	W	L	PCT	GB	Qualification
1	San Miguel Beermen	7	2	.778	—	Twice-to-beat in the quarterfinals
2	Purefoods TJ Hotdogs	6	3	.667 (Note: Head-to-head record: Purefoods 85–75 Red Bull)	1	Twice-to-beat in the quarterfinals
3	Batang Red Bull Thunder	6	3	.667	1	Twice-to-beat in the quarterfinals
4	Alaska Aces	5	4	.556 (Note: Head-to-head record: Alaska 99–94 Sta. Lucia)	2	Twice-to-beat in the quarterfinals
5	Sta. Lucia Realtors	5	4	.556	2	Twice-to-win in the quarterfinals
6	Barangay Ginebra Kings	4	5	.444	3	Twice-to-win in the quarterfinals
7	Tanduay Rhum Masters	3	6	.333 (Note: Head-to-head differential: Pop Cola +21, Mobiline +15, Shell −13, Tanduay −23; seventh-seed playoff: Tanduay 88–82 Pop Cola; eighth-seed playoff: Mobiline 71–56 Shell)	4	Twice-to-win in the quarterfinals
8	Mobiline Phone Pals	3	6	.333	4	Twice-to-win in the quarterfinals
9	Shell Turbo Chargers	3	6	.333	4	
10	Pop Cola Panthers	3	6	.333	4	

Source: PBA.ph

== Seventh seed playoff ==
Viva TV

July 20

Tanduay Rhum Masters 88, Pop Cola Panthers 82

Cuneta Astrodome, Pasay

== Eighth seed playoff ==
Viva TV

July 20

Mobiline Phone Pals 71, Shell Turbo Chargers 56

Cuneta Astrodome, Pasay

== Bracket ==
Quarterfinals (Top 4 twice-to-beat)
1	San Miguel	81
8	Mobiline	71
4	Alaska	78
5	Sta. Lucia	68
2	Purefoods	82
7	Tanduay	74
3	Red Bull	82
6	Brgy. Ginebra	70

Semifinals (Best-of-5)
1	San Miguel	3
4	Alaska	2
2	Purefoods	2
3	Red Bull	3

Finals (Best-of-7)
1	San Miguel	2
3	Red Bull	4
Third-place playoff
2	Purefoods	89
4	Alaska	96

== Quarterfinals ==
=== (1) San Miguel vs. (8) Mobiline ===
Viva TV

July 25

San Miguel Beermen 81, Mobiline Phone Pals 71
San Miguel wins series in one game

Philsports Arena, Pasig

=== (2) Purefoods vs. (7) Tanduay ===
Viva TV

July 27

recap

Purefoods TJ Hotdogs 82, Tanduay Rhum Masters 74
Purefoods wins series in one game

Philsports Arena, Pasig

=== (3) Red Bull vs. (6) Barangay Ginebra ===
Viva TV

July 27

Batang Red Bull Thunder 82, Barangay Ginebra Kings 70
Red Bull wins series in one game

Philsports Arena, Pasig

=== (4) Alaska vs. (5) Sta. Lucia ===
Viva TV

July 25

Alaska Aces 78, Sta. Lucia Realtors 68
Alaska wins series in one game

Philsports Arena, Pasig

== Semifinals ==
=== (1) San Miguel vs. (4) Alaska ===
Viva TV

July 29

recap

San Miguel Beermen 66, Alaska Aces 75

Araneta Coliseum, Quezon City

Viva TV

August 1

San Miguel Beermen 78, Alaska Aces 71

Philsports Arena, Pasig

Viva TV

August 3

recap

San Miguel Beermen 80, Alaska Aces 74

Cuneta Astrodome, Pasay

Viva TV

August 5

San Miguel Beermen 91, Alaska Aces 98 (OT)

Araneta Coliseum, Quezon City

Viva TV

August 8

recap

San Miguel Beermen 83, Alaska Aces 71
San Miguel wins series, 3–2

Ynares Center, Antipolo

=== (2) Purefoods vs. (3) Red Bull ===
Viva TV

July 29

Purefoods TJ Hotdogs 91, Batang Red Bull Thunder 75

Araneta Coliseum, Quezon City

Viva TV

August 1

recap

Purefoods TJ Hotdogs 76, Batang Red Bull Thunder 95

Philsports Arena, Pasig

Viva TV

August 3

Purefoods TJ Hotdogs 84, Batang Red Bull Thunder 100

Cuneta Astrodome, Pasay

Viva TV

August 5

recap

Purefoods TJ Hotdogs 77, Batang Red Bull Thunder 75

Araneta Coliseum, Quezon City

Viva TV

August 8

Purefoods TJ Hotdogs 77, Batang Red Bull Thunder 87
Red Bull wins series, 3–2

Ynares Center, Antipolo

== Third place playoff ==
Viva TV

August 12

Purefoods TJ Hotdogs 89, Alaska Aces 96

Araneta Coliseum, Quezon City

== Finals ==
Viva TV

August 12

San Miguel Beermen 78, Batang Red Bull Thunder 80

Araneta Coliseum, Quezon City

Viva TV

August 15

San Miguel Beermen 86, Batang Red Bull Thunder 92

Philsports Arena, Pasig

Viva TV

August 17

San Miguel Beermen 100, Batang Red Bull Thunder 91

Philsports Arena, Pasig

Viva TV

August 19

San Miguel Beermen 88, Batang Red Bull Thunder 72

Araneta Coliseum, Quezon City

Viva TV

August 22

San Miguel Beermen 77, Batang Red Bull Thunder 79

Araneta Coliseum, Quezon City

Viva TV

August 24

San Miguel Beermen 69, Batang Red Bull Thunder 75
Red Bull wins series, 4–2

Araneta Coliseum, Quezon City
