= 2000 PBA All-Filipino Cup =

- Duration: February 20 – June 11, 2000
- TV partner(s): Viva TV (IBC)

Finals
- Champions: Alaska Milkmen
- Runners-up: Purefoods TJ Hotdogs

Awards
- Best Player: Kenneth Duremdes (Alaska Milkmen)
- Finals MVP: Poch Juinio (Alaska Milkmen)

PBA All-Filipino Cup chronology
- < 1999 2001 >

PBA conference chronology
- < 1999 Governors' 2000 Commissioner's >

The 2000 PBA All-Filipino Cup or known as the 2000 Alaxan PBA All-Filipino Cup for sponsorship reasons, was the first conference of the 2000 PBA season. It started on February 20 and ended on June 11, 2000. The tournament is an All-Filipino format, which doesn't require an import or a pure-foreign player for each team.

== Format ==
The following format will be observed for the duration of the conference:

- The teams were divided into 2 groups.

Group A:

1. Alaska Aces
2. Purefoods TJ Hotdogs
3. San Miguel Beermen
4. Sta. Lucia Realtors
5. Tanduay Rhum Masters

Group B:

1. Barangay Ginebra Kings
2. Batang Red Bull Thunder
3. Mobiline Phone Pals
4. Pop Cola Panthers
5. Shell Turbo Chargers

- Teams in a group will play against each other once and against teams in the other group twice; 14 games per team.
- The top eight teams after the eliminations will advance to the quarterfinals.
- Quarterfinals:
  - Top four teams will have a twice-to-beat advantage against their opponent.
  - QF1: #1 vs. #8
  - QF2: #2 vs. #7
  - QF3: #3 vs. #6
  - QF4: #4 vs. #5
- Best-of-five semifinals:
  - SF1: QF1 vs. QF4
  - SF2: QF2 vs. QF3
- Third-place playoff: losers of the semifinals
- Best-of-seven finals: winners of the semifinals

== Elimination round ==
=== Team standings ===
Pos	Team	W	L	PCT	GB	Qualification
1	Tanduay Rhum Masters	12	2	.857	—	Twice-to-beat in the quarterfinals
2	San Miguel Beermen	10	4	.714 (Note: Head-to-head differential: San Miguel +9, Alaska −9)	2	Twice-to-beat in the quarterfinals
3	Alaska Aces	10	4	.714	2	Twice-to-beat in the quarterfinals
4	Purefoods TJ Hotdogs	8	6	.571	4	Twice-to-beat in the quarterfinals
5	Sta. Lucia Realtors	6	8	.429 (Note: Head-to-head differential: Sta. Lucia +10, Pop Cola −10)	6	Twice-to-win in the quarterfinals
6	Pop Cola Panthers	6	8	.429	6	Twice-to-win in the quarterfinals
7	Mobiline Phone Pals	5	9	.357 (Note: Head-to-head differential: Mobiline +24, Barangay Ginebra +3, Shell −27; eighth-seed playoff: Barangay Ginebra 71–68 Shell)	7	Twice-to-win in the quarterfinals
8	Barangay Ginebra Kings	5	9	.357	7	Twice-to-win in the quarterfinals
9	Shell Turbo Chargers	5	9	.357	7	
10	Batang Red Bull Thunder (Note: Red Bull had to forfeit two of their wins (both against Sta. Lucia) when they fielded an ineligible player.)	3	11	.214	9	

Source: PBA.ph

== Eighth seed playoff ==
Mobiline had a better quotient on their games among Shell and Barangay Ginebra hence they were awarded with the #7 seed.

VTV

May 7

Shell Velocity 68, Barangay Ginebra Kings 71

PhilSports Arena, Pasig

== Bracket ==
Quarterfinals (Top 4 twice-to-beat)
1	Tanduay	101
8	Brgy. Ginebra	78
4	Purefoods	68	89
5	Sta. Lucia	93	79
2	San Miguel	82
7	Mobiline	61
3	Alaska	81
6	Pop Cola	67

Semifinals (Best-of-5)
1	Tanduay	1
4	Purefoods	3
2	San Miguel	1
3	Alaska	3

Finals (Best-of-7)
4	Purefoods	1
3	Alaska	4
Third-place playoff
1	Tanduay	103
2	San Miguel	92

== Quarterfinals ==
=== (1) Tanduay vs. (8) Barangay Ginebra ===
VTV

May 10

recap

Tanduay Rhum Masters 101, Barangay Ginebra Kings 78
Tanduay wins series in one game

PhilSports Arena, Pasig

=== (2) San Miguel vs. (7) Mobiline ===
VTV

May 12

San Miguel Beermen 82, Mobiline Phone Pals 61
San Miguel wins series in one game

PhilSports Arena, Pasig

=== (3) Alaska vs. (6) Pop Cola ===
VTV

May 12

Alaska Milkmen 81, Pop Cola 800s 67
Alaska wins series in one game

PhilSports Arena, Pasig

=== (4) Purefoods vs. (5) Sta. Lucia ===
VTV

May 10

Purefoods TJ Hotdogs 68, Sta. Lucia Realtors 93

PhilSports Arena, Pasig

VTV

May 14

recap

Purefoods TJ Hotdogs 89, Sta. Lucia Realtors 79
Purefoods wins series in two games

Araneta Coliseum, Quezon City

== Semifinals ==
=== (1) Tanduay vs. (4) Purefoods ===
VTV

May 17

Tanduay Rhum Masters 91, Purefoods TJ Hotdogs 79

PhilSports Arena, Pasig

VTV

May 19

~~Tanduay Rhum Masters 85, Purefoods TJ Hotdogs 75~~

PhilSports Arena, Pasig

VTV

May 21

~~Tanduay Rhum Masters 93, Purefoods TJ Hotdogs 70~~
~~Tanduay wins series, 3–0~~

Araneta Coliseum, Quezon City

On May 22, PBA commissioner Jun Bernardino forfeited Tanduay's Games 2 and 3 victories in favor of Purefoods for the deportation of Sonny Alvarado. Purefoods now leads the series 2–1.

VTV

May 24

Tanduay Rhum Masters vs. Purefoods TJ Hotdogs
Game postponed

PhilSports Arena, Pasig

VTV

May 26

Tanduay Rhum Masters vs. Purefoods TJ Hotdogs
Game postponed indefinitely

PhilSports Arena, Pasig

VTV

May 31

Tanduay Rhum Masters 71, Purefoods TJ Hotdogs 72 (OT)
Purefoods wins series, 3–1

Araneta Coliseum, Quezon City

The day after Tanduay swept the series 3–0, the Bureau of Immigration and Deportation (BID) revoked Sonny Alvarado's Filipino citizenship as it uncovered that the player used fraudulent papers; consequently, the BID ordered Alvarado's deportation. This caused PBA commissioner Jun Bernardino to forfeit two of Tanduay's semifinal wins (Games 2 and 3) since Alvarado played in those games (he didn't play in the first game). The league earlier forfeited Batang Red Bull's wins when 18-year-old Kerby Raymundo was found to have deficient academic credentials. With the forfeitures, the series would have resumed on Game 4 with Purefoods leading the series 2–1; however, Tanduay secured a temporary restraining order (TRO) that prevented the league from staging Game 4 of their series. The league suspended the Game 4 on the May 24 playdate, the first time a game has been suspended for a cause other than a typhoon, an earthquake, or a bomb threat.

PBA legal counsel Butch Cleofe warned that Tanduay faced suspension from the league, a hefty fine and even expulsion when it fails to show up on the May 26 playdate. A P500,000 fine faced the franchise plus other penalties the commissioner may impose. Prior to the game, Tanduay was able to secure an extension of the TRO hence Game 4 was suspended for a second time; this has been the first time a PBA game has been suspended via a court order. The league has already lost P600,000 on gate receipts and Viva TV lost about P2 million in TV commercials. The league rejected Tanduay's offer of resetting the series with them leading 1–0, with the games that Alvarado played declared as "no contests"; the league insisted that the Rhum Masters play Game 4 with them trailing 1–2. On May 30, Tanduay relented and agreed to play Game 4 with them trailing 1–2. Bernardino would deal with Tanduay's actions "accordingly with due process". To prevent such events from happening again, the PBA Board has decided that Filipino-Americans would have to secure clearances from the BID and the Department of Justice (DOJ; previously, only a BID clearance was sufficient).

When Game 4 was finally played, the game went into overtime; Purefoods' Boyet Fernandez converted a three-point field goal with 0.2 of a second remaining to seal Purefoods' unlikely Finals qualification against 1990s rival Alaska.

=== (2) San Miguel vs. (3) Alaska ===
VTV

May 17

San Miguel Beermen 70, Alaska Milkmen 77

PhilSports Arena, Pasig

VTV

May 19

San Miguel Beermen 77, Alaska Milkmen 75

PhilSports Arena, Pasig

VTV

May 21

San Miguel Beermen 78, Alaska Milkmen 83

Araneta Coliseum, Quezon City

VTV

May 24

San Miguel Beermen 83, Alaska Milkmen 120
Alaska wins series, 3–1

PhilSports Arena, Pasig

== Third place playoff ==
VTV

June 2

Tanduay Rhum Masters 103, San Miguel Beermen 92

PhilSports Arena, Pasig

== Finals ==
VTV

June 2

Alaska Milkmen 59, Purefoods TJ Hotdogs 73

PhilSports Arena, Pasig

VTV

June 4

Alaska Milkmen 93, Purefoods TJ Hotdogs 76

Araneta Coliseum, Quezon City

VTV

June 7

Alaska Milkmen 79, Purefoods TJ Hotdogs 71

Ynares Center, Antipolo

VTV

June 9

Alaska Milkmen 88, Purefoods TJ Hotdogs 75

Philsports Arena, Pasig

VTV

June 11

Alaska Milkmen 85, Purefoods TJ Hotdogs 84
Alaska wins series, 4–1

Araneta Coliseum, Quezon City

Alaska won the title on Game 5 despite trailing by six points late in the fourth quarter; Rodney Santos and Poch Juinio carried the scoring slack when Bong Hawkins and Johnny Abarrientos had bad starts. Abarrientos was able to make it up by hitting a jump-shot to give the Milkmen the lead 85–82. Noy Castillo converted both free-throws to cut the lead to one. Alaska missed four free-throws, including two intentional misses by James Wallkvist with 0.5 of a second remaining to clinch their first All-Filipino championship since 1998. Alvin Patrimonio had a series-best 22 points but went scoreless at the final quarter that helped Alaska to catch up.
