= 2000 PBA Governors' Cup =

- Duration: September 30 – December 20, 2000
- TV partner(s): Viva TV on IBC

Finals
- Champions: San Miguel Beermen
- Runners-up: Purefoods TJ Hotdogs

Awards
- Best Player: Danny Ildefonso (San Miguel Beermen)
- Best Import: Derrick Brown (Purefoods TJ Hotdogs)
- Finals MVP: Danny Seigle (San Miguel Beermen)

PBA Governors' Cup chronology
- < 1999 2001 >

PBA conference chronology
- < 2000 Commissioner's 2001 All-Filipino >

The 2000 Philippine Basketball Association (PBA) Governors' Cup was the third and last conference of the 2000 PBA season. It started on September 30 and ended on December 20, 2000. The tournament is an import-laden format, which requires an import or a pure-foreign player for each team.

== Format ==
The following format will be observed for the duration of the conference:

- One-round robin eliminations; 9 games per team; Teams are then seeded by basis on win–loss records.
- The top eight teams after the eliminations will advance to the quarterfinals.
- Quarterfinals:
  - Top four teams will have a twice-to-beat advantage against their opponent.
  - QF1: #1 vs. #8
  - QF2: #2 vs. #7
  - QF3: #3 vs. #6
  - QF4: #4 vs. #5
- Best-of-five semifinals:
  - SF1: QF1 vs. QF4
  - SF2: QF2 vs. QF3
- Third-place playoff: losers of the semifinals
- Best-of-seven finals: winners of the semifinals

== Imports ==
The following is the list of imports with the replacement imports being highlighted. GP is the number of games played in the conference.

Team	Name	GP
Alaska Aces	(United States) Sean Chambers	11
Barangay Ginebra Kings	(United States) Roy Hammonds	3
Barangay Ginebra Kings	(United States) Bryan Green	8
Batang Red Bull Thunder	(United States) Raymond Tutt	15
Mobiline Phone Pals	(United States) Todd Bernard	16
Pop Cola Panthers	(United States) Sean Green	7
Pop Cola Panthers	(United States) Cedric McCullough*	1
Pop Cola Panthers	(United States) Bryatt Vann	1
Purefoods TJ Hotdogs	(United States) Derrick Brown	20
San Miguel Beermen	(United States) Lamont Strothers	20
Shell Turbo Chargers	(United States) John Morton	6
Shell Turbo Chargers	(United States) James Brewer	3
Sta. Lucia Realtors	(United States) Joe Temple	6
Sta. Lucia Realtors	(United States) Isaac Fontaine	4
Tanduay Rhum Masters	(United States) Maurice Bell	11

^{(*) Played only in Pop Cola's 4th game vs Mobiline before Sean Green was recalled and replaced anew by Bryatt Vann in their last game in the eliminations.}

== Elimination round ==
=== Team standings ===
Pos	Team	W	L	PCT	GB	Qualification
1	Mobiline Phone Pals	7	2	.778 (Note: Head-to-head record: Mobiline 1–0 Red Bull)	—	Twice-to-beat in the quarterfinals
2	Batang Red Bull Thunder	7	2	.778	—	Twice-to-beat in the quarterfinals
3	Tanduay Rhum Masters	6	3	.667	1	Twice-to-beat in the quarterfinals
4	Purefoods TJ Hotdogs	5	4	.556 (Note: Head-to-head record: Alaska 1–0 Purefoods)	2	Twice-to-beat in the quarterfinals
5	Alaska Aces	5	4	.556	2	Twice-to-win in the quarterfinals
6	San Miguel Beermen	4	5	.444 (Note: Head-to-head differential: San Miguel +23, Sta. Lucia +3, Barangay Ginebra −28)	3	Twice-to-win in the quarterfinals
7	Sta. Lucia Realtors	4	5	.444	3	Twice-to-win in the quarterfinals
8	Barangay Ginebra Kings	4	5	.444	3	Twice-to-win in the quarterfinals
9	Pop Cola Panthers	2	7	.222	5	
10	Shell Turbo Chargers	1	8	.111	6	

Source: PBA.ph

== Bracket ==
Quarterfinals (Top 4 twice-to-beat)
1	Mobiline	81	100
8	Brgy. Ginebra	84	86
4	Purefoods	80	88
5	Alaska	91	69
2	Red Bull	91
7	Sta. Lucia	87
3	Tanduay	89	83
6	San Miguel	100	90

Semifinals (Best-of-5)
1	Mobiline	1
4	Purefoods	3
2	Red Bull	1
6	San Miguel	3

Finals (Best-of-7)
4	Purefoods	1
6	San Miguel	4
Third place playoff
1	Mobiline	89
2	Red Bull	98

== Quarterfinals ==
=== (1) Mobiline vs. (8) Barangay Ginebra ===
VTV

November 22

recap

Mobiline Phone Pals 81, Barangay Ginebra Kings 84

Philsports Arena, Pasig

VTV

November 26

Mobiline Phone Pals 100, Barangay Ginebra Kings 86
Mobiline wins series in two games

Ynares Center, Antipolo

=== (2) Red Bull vs. (7) Sta. Lucia ===
VTV

November 24

recap

Batang Red Bull Thunder 91, Sta. Lucia Realtors 87
Red Bull wins series in one game

Philsports Arena, Pasig

=== (3) Tanduay vs. (6) San Miguel ===
VTV

November 24

Tanduay Rhum Masters 89, San Miguel Beermen 100

Philsports Arena, Pasig

VTV

November 29

recap

Tanduay Rhum Masters 83, San Miguel Beermen 90
San Miguel wins series in two games

Philsports Arena, Pasig

=== (4) Purefoods vs. (5) Alaska ===
VTV

November 22

Purefoods TJ Hotdogs 80, Alaska Aces 91

Philsports Arena, Pasig

VTV

November 26

recap

Purefoods TJ Hotdogs 88, Alaska Aces 69
Purefoods wins series in two games

Ynares Center, Antipolo

== Semifinals ==
=== (1) Mobiline vs. (4) Purefoods ===
VTV

December 1

recap

Mobiline Phone Pals 69, Purefoods TJ Hotdogs 93

Ynares Center, Antipolo

VTV

December 3

Mobiline Phone Pals 102, Purefoods TJ Hotdogs 92

Araneta Coliseum, Quezon City

VTV

December 6

recap

Mobiline Phone Pals 97, Purefoods TJ Hotdogs 110

Araneta Coliseum, Quezon City

VTV

December 8

Mobiline Phone Pals 90, Purefoods TJ Hotdogs 100
Purefoods wins series, 3–1

Araneta Coliseum, Quezon City

=== (2) Red Bull vs. (6) San Miguel ===
VTV

December 1

Batang Red Bull Thunder 97, San Miguel Beermen 100

Ynares Center, Antipolo

VTV

December 3

recap

Batang Red Bull Thunder 68, San Miguel Beermen 82

Araneta Coliseum, Quezon City

VTV

December 6

Batang Red Bull Thunder 98, San Miguel Beermen 84

Araneta Coliseum, Quezon City

VTV

December 8

recap

Batang Red Bull Thunder 87, San Miguel Beermen 93
San Miguel wins series, 3–1

Araneta Coliseum, Quezon City

== Third place playoff ==
VTV

December 10

Mobiline Phone Pals 89, Batang Red Bull Thunder 98

Araneta Coliseum, Quezon City

== Finals ==
VTV

December 10

Purefoods TJ Hotdogs 79, San Miguel Beermen 85

Araneta Coliseum, Quezon City

VTV

December 13

Purefoods TJ Hotdogs 76, San Miguel Beermen 79

Philsports Arena, Pasig

VTV

December 15

Purefoods TJ Hotdogs 101, San Miguel Beermen 105 (2OT)

Philsports Arena, Pasig

VTV

December 17

Purefoods TJ Hotdogs 107, San Miguel Beermen 95

Araneta Coliseum, Quezon City

VTV

December 20

Purefoods TJ Hotdogs 88, San Miguel Beermen 96
San Miguel wins series, 4–1

Philsports Arena, Pasig
