= 2001 PBA All-Filipino Cup =

Philippine basketball tournament

- Duration: January 28 – May 18, 2001
- TV partner(s): Viva TV on IBC

Finals
- Champions: San Miguel Beermen
- Runners-up: Barangay Ginebra Kings

Awards
- Best Player: Danny Ildefonso (San Miguel Beermen)
- Finals MVP: Danny Seigle (San Miguel Beermen)

PBA All-Filipino Cup chronology
- < 2000 2002 >

PBA conference chronology
- < 2000 Governors' 2001 Commissioner's >

The 2001 Philippine Basketball Association (PBA) All-Filipino Cup was the first conference of the 2001 PBA season. It started on January 28 and ended on May 18, 2001. The tournament is an All-Filipino format, which doesn't require an import or a pure-foreign player for each team.

== Format ==
The following format will be observed for the duration of the conference:

- The teams were divided into 2 groups.

Group A:

1. Alaska Aces
2. Barangay Ginebra Kings
3. San Miguel Beermen
4. Shell Turbo Chargers
5. Sta. Lucia Realtors

Group B:

1. Batang Red Bull Thunder
2. Mobiline Phone Pals
3. Pop Cola Panthers
4. Purefoods TJ Hotdogs
5. Tanduay Rhum Masters

- Teams in a group will play against each other once and against teams in the other group twice; 14 games per team.
- The top eight teams after the eliminations will advance to the quarterfinals.
- Quarterfinals:
  - Top four teams will have a twice-to-beat advantage against their opponent.
  - QF1: #1 vs. #8
  - QF2: #2 vs. #7
  - QF3: #3 vs. #6
  - QF4: #4 vs. #5
- Best-of-five semifinals:
  - SF1: QF1 vs. QF4
  - SF2: QF2 vs. QF3
- Third-place playoff: losers of the semifinals
- Best-of-seven finals: winners of the semifinals

== Elimination round ==
=== Team standings ===
Pos	Team	W	L	PCT	GB	Qualification
1	Shell Turbo Chargers	9	5	.643 (Note: Head-to-head record: Shell 1–0 San Miguel)	—	Twice-to-beat in the quarterfinals
2	San Miguel Beermen	9	5	.643	—	Twice-to-beat in the quarterfinals
3	Pop Cola Panthers	8	6	.571 (Note: Head-to-head record: Pop Cola 1–0 Purefoods)	1	Twice-to-beat in the quarterfinals
4	Purefoods TJ Hotdogs	8	6	.571	1	Twice-to-beat in the quarterfinals
5	Barangay Ginebra Kings	7	7	.500 (Note: Head-to-head record: Barangay Ginebra 2–0, Alaska 1–1, Red Bull 0–2)	2	Twice-to-win in the quarterfinals
6	Alaska Aces	7	7	.500	2	Twice-to-win in the quarterfinals
7	Batang Red Bull Thunder	7	7	.500	2	Twice-to-win in the quarterfinals
8	Mobiline Phone Pals	6	8	.429	3	Twice-to-win in the quarterfinals
9	Tanduay Rhum Masters	5	9	.357	4	
10	Sta. Lucia Realtors	4	10	.286	5	

Source: PBA.ph

== Bracket ==
Quarterfinals (Top 4 twice-to-beat)
1	Shell	72	80
8	Mobiline	76	69
4	Purefoods	76	69
5	Ginebra	77	70
2	San Miguel	73	84
7	Red Bull	85	82
3	Pop Cola	71	74
6	Alaska	78	65

Semifinals (Best-of-5)
1	Shell	2
5	Ginebra	3
2	San Miguel	3
3	Pop Cola	1

Finals (Best-of-7)
5	Ginebra	2
2	San Miguel	4
Third place playoff
1	Shell	75
3	Pop Cola	83

== Quarterfinals ==
=== (1) Shell vs. (8) Mobiline ===
Viva TV

April 15

recap

Shell Turbo Chargers 72, Mobiline Phone Pals 76

Makati Coliseum, Makati

Viva TV

April 20

recap

Shell Turbo Chargers 80, Mobiline Phone Pals 69
Shell wins series in two games

PhilSports Arena, Pasig

=== (2) San Miguel vs. (7) Red Bull ===
Viva TV

April 18

recap

San Miguel Beermen 73, Red Bull Thunder 85

Araneta Coliseum, Quezon City

Viva TV

April 22

San Miguel Beermen 84, Red Bull Thunder 82
San Miguel wins series in two games

Araneta Coliseum, Quezon City

=== (3) Pop Cola vs. (6) Alaska ===
Viva TV

April 18

Pop Cola Panthers 71, Alaska Aces 78

Araneta Coliseum, Quezon City

Viva TV

April 22

recap

Pop Cola Panthers 74, Alaska Aces 65
Pop Cola wins series in two games

Araneta Coliseum, Quezon City

=== (4) Purefoods vs. (5) Barangay Ginebra ===
Viva TV

April 15

Purefoods TJ Hotdogs 76, Barangay Ginebra Kings 77

Makati Coliseum, Makati

Viva TV

April 20

Purefoods TJ Hotdogs 69, Barangay Ginebra Kings 70
Barangay Ginebra wins series in two games

PhilSports Arena, Pasig

== Semifinals ==
=== (1) Shell vs. (5) Barangay Ginebra ===
Viva TV

April 25

Shell Turbo Chargers 78, Barangay Ginebra Kings 90

PhilSports Arena, Pasig

Viva TV

April 27

recap

Shell Turbo Chargers 72, Barangay Ginebra Kings 74

PhilSports Arena, Pasig

Viva TV

April 29

Shell Turbo Chargers 113, Barangay Ginebra Kings 87

Araneta Coliseum, Quezon City

Viva TV

May 2

Shell Turbo Chargers 78, Barangay Ginebra Kings 67

PhilSports Arena, Pasig

Viva TV

May 4

recap

Shell Turbo Chargers 66, Barangay Ginebra Kings 75
Barangay Ginebra wins series, 3–2

Araneta Coliseum, Quezon City

=== (2) San Miguel vs. (3) Pop Cola ===
Viva TV

April 25

recap

San Miguel Beermen 64, Pop Cola Panthers 73

PhilSports Arena, Pasig

Viva TV

April 27

San Miguel Beermen 81, Pop Cola Panthers 66

PhilSports Arena, Pasig

Viva TV

April 29

recap

San Miguel Beermen 82, Pop Cola Panthers 75

Araneta Coliseum, Quezon City

Viva TV

May 2

recap

San Miguel Beermen 91, Pop Cola Panthers 87
San Miguel wins series, 3–1

PhilSports Arena, Pasig

== Third place playoff ==
Viva TV

May 9

Shell Turbo Chargers 75, Pop Cola Panthers 83

PhilSports Arena, Pasig

== Finals ==
Viva TV

May 6

San Miguel Beermen 81, Barangay Ginebra Kings 75

Araneta Coliseum, Quezon City

Viva TV

May 9

San Miguel Beermen 89, Barangay Ginebra Kings 72

Philsports Arena, Pasig

Viva TV

May 11

San Miguel Beermen 80, Barangay Ginebra Kings 82

Philsports Arena, Pasig

Viva TV

May 13

San Miguel Beermen 64, Barangay Ginebra Kings 80

Araneta Coliseum, Quezon City

Viva TV

May 16

San Miguel Beermen 98, Barangay Ginebra Kings 95 (OT)

Araneta Coliseum, Quezon City

Viva TV

May 18

San Miguel Beermen 95, Barangay Ginebra Kings 75
San Miguel wins series, 4–2

Araneta Coliseum, Quezon City
