= 2000 PBA Commissioner's Cup =

Second conference of the 2000 PBA season

- Duration: June 23 – September 15, 2000
- TV partner(s): Viva TV on IBC

Finals
- Champions: San Miguel Beermen
- Runners-up: Sta. Lucia Realtors

Awards
- Best Player: Danny Ildefonso (San Miguel Beermen)
- Best Import: Ansu Sesay (Sta. Lucia Realtors)
- Finals MVP: Danny Ildefonso (San Miguel Beermen)

PBA Commissioner's Cup chronology
- < 1999 2001 >

PBA conference chronology
- < 2000 All-Filipino 2000 Governors' >

The 2000 Philippine Basketball Association (PBA) Commissioner's Cup was the second conference of the 2000 PBA season. It started on June 23 and ended on September 15, 2000. The tournament is an import-laden format, which requires an import or a pure-foreign player for each team.

== Format ==
The following format will be observed for the duration of the conference:

- One-round robin eliminations; 9 games per team; Teams are then seeded by basis on win–loss records.
- The top eight teams after the eliminations will advance to the quarterfinals.
- Quarterfinals:
  - Top four teams will have a twice-to-beat advantage against their opponent.
  - QF1: #1 vs. #8
  - QF2: #2 vs. #7
  - QF3: #3 vs. #6
  - QF4: #4 vs. #5
- Best-of-five semifinals:
  - SF1: QF1 vs. QF4
  - SF2: QF2 vs. QF3
- Third-place playoff: losers of the semifinals
- Best-of-seven finals: winners of the semifinals

== Imports ==
The following is the list of imports with the replacement imports being highlighted. GP is the number of games played in the conference.

Team	Name	GP
Alaska Aces	(United States) Marcus Liberty	2
Alaska Aces	(United States) Kirk King	12
Barangay Ginebra Kings	(United States) Ryan Fletcher	10
Batang Red Bull Thunder	(United States) Thaddeus Delaney	3
Batang Red Bull Thunder	(United States) Jack Hartman	5
Batang Red Bull Thunder	(United States) Raymond Tutt	1
Mobiline Phone Pals	(United States) Carlos Strong	9
Mobiline Phone Pals	(United States) Milton Henderson	1
Pop Cola Panthers	(United States) Carl Thomas	3
Pop Cola Panthers	(United States) Harold Ellis	7
Purefoods TJ Hotdogs	(Niger) Julius Nwosu	9
Purefoods TJ Hotdogs	(United States) Joe Stephens*	1
San Miguel Beermen	(United States) Stephen Howard	18
Shell Turbo Chargers	(United States) John Best	9
Sta. Lucia Realtors	(United States) Ansu Sesay	19
Tanduay Rhum Masters	(United States) Ira Clark	15

^{(*) Played only in Purefoods' seventh game in the eliminations until Nwosu returns in their last two games.}

== Elimination round ==
=== Team standings ===
Pos	Team	W	L	PCT	GB	Qualification
1	San Miguel Beermen	7	2	.778	—	Twice-to-beat in the quarterfinals
2	Sta. Lucia Realtors	6	3	.667	1	Twice-to-beat in the quarterfinals
3	Tanduay Rhum Masters	5	4	.556 (Note: Head-to-head record: Tanduay 1–0 Alaska)	2	Twice-to-beat in the quarterfinals
4	Alaska Milkmen	5	4	.556	2	Twice-to-beat in the quarterfinals
5	Purefoods TJ Hotdogs	4	5	.444 (Note: Head-to-head differential: Purefoods +22, Mobiline +9, Sunkist −8, Barangay Ginebra −23)	3	Twice-to-win in the quarterfinals
6	Mobiline Phone Pals	4	5	.444	3	Twice-to-win in the quarterfinals
7	Sunkist Orange Juicers	4	5	.444	3	Twice-to-win in the quarterfinals
8	Barangay Ginebra Kings	4	5	.444	3	Twice-to-win in the quarterfinals
9	Batang Red Bull Thunder	3	6	.333 (Note: Head-to-head record: Red Bull 1–0 Shell)	4	
10	Shell Turbo Chargers	3	6	.333	4	

Source: PBA.ph

== Bracket ==
Quarterfinals (Top 4 twice-to-beat)
1	San Miguel	90
8	Brgy. Ginebra	89
4	Alaska	85
5	Purefoods	82
2	Sta. Lucia	72
7	Sunkist	69
3	Tanduay	77
6	Mobiline	66

Semifinals (Best-of-5)
1	San Miguel	3
4	Alaska	0
2	Sta. Lucia	3
3	Tanduay	1

Finals (Best-of-7)
1	San Miguel	4
2	Sta. Lucia	1
Third place playoff
4	Alaska	119
3	Tanduay	71

== Quarterfinals ==
=== (1) San Miguel vs. (8) Barangay Ginebra ===
VTV

August 18

San Miguel Beermen 90, Barangay Ginebra Kings 89
San Miguel wins series in one game

Ynares Center, Antipolo

=== (2) Sta. Lucia vs. (7) Sunkist ===
VTV

August 20

Sta. Lucia Realtors 72, Sunkist Orange Juicers 69
Sta. Lucia wins series in one game

Araneta Coliseum, Quezon City

=== (3) Tanduay vs, (6) Mobiline ===
VTV

August 20

recap

Tanduay Rhum Masters 77, Mobiline Phone Pals 66
Tanduay wins series in one game

Araneta Coliseum, Quezon City

=== (4) Alaska vs. (5) Purefoods ===
VTV

August 18

recap

Alaska Milkmen 85, Purefoods TJ Hotdogs 82
Alaska wins series in one game

Ynares Center, Antipolo

== Semifinals ==
=== (1) San Miguel vs. (4) Alaska ===
VTV

August 23

San Miguel Beermen 106, Alaska Milkmen 91

Araneta Coliseum, Quezon City

VTV

August 25

recap

San Miguel Beermen 94, Alaska Milkmen 93

Araneta Coliseum, Quezon City

VTV

August 30

recap

San Miguel Beermen 88, Alaska Milkmen 76
San Miguel wins series, 3–0

Araneta Coliseum, Quezon City

=== (2) Sta. Lucia vs. (3) Tanduay ===
VTV

August 23

recap

Sta. Lucia Realtors 79, Tanduay Rhum Masters 65

Araneta Coliseum, Quezon City

VTV

August 25

Sta. Lucia Realtors 93, Tanduay Rhum Masters 85

Araneta Coliseum, Quezon City

VTV

August 30

Sta. Lucia Realtors 73, Tanduay Rhum Masters 95

Araneta Coliseum, Quezon City

VTV

September 1

recap

Sta. Lucia Realtors 80, Tanduay Rhum Masters 71
Sta.Lucia wins series, 3–1

Araneta Coliseum, Quezon City

== Third place playoff ==
VTV

September 3

Tanduay Rhum Masters 71, Alaska Milkmen 119

Araneta Coliseum, Quezon City

== Finals ==
VTV

September 3

San Miguel Beermen 106, Sta. Lucia Realtors 78

Araneta Coliseum, Quezon City

VTV

September 6

San Miguel Beermen 72, Sta. Lucia Realtors 67

Urdaneta Sports Complex, Pangasinan

VTV

September 10

San Miguel Beermen 89, Sta. Lucia Realtors 85

Araneta Coliseum, Quezon City

VTV

September 13

San Miguel Beermen 66, Sta. Lucia Realtors 78

Philsports Arena, Pasig

VTV

September 15

San Miguel Beermen 79, Sta. Lucia Realtors 77
San Miguel wins series, 4–1

Araneta Coliseum, Quezon City
