= 2002 PBA All-Filipino Cup =

- Duration: October 20 – December 25, 2002
- TV partner(s): Viva TV on IBC

Finals
- Champions: Coca Cola Tigers
- Runners-up: Alaska Aces

Awards
- Best Player: Jeffrey Cariaso (Coca Cola Tigers)
- Finals MVP: Rudy Hatfield (Coca Cola Tigers)

PBA All-Filipino Cup chronology
- < 2001 2003 >

PBA conference chronology
- < 2002 Commissioner's 2003 All-Filipino >

The 2002 Philippine Basketball Association (PBA) All-Filipino Cup, or known as the 2002 Selecta-PBA All-Filipino Cup for sponsorship reasons, was the third and last conference of the 2002 PBA season. It started on October 20 and ended on December 25, 2002. The tournament is an All-Filipino format, which doesn't require an import or a pure-foreign player for each team.

== Format ==
The following format will be observed for the duration of the conference:

- Single-round robin eliminations; 9 games per team; Teams are then seeded by basis on win–loss records.
- The top two teams after the eliminations will automatically qualify to the semifinals, the next four teams will advance to the quarterfinals.
- Knockout quarterfinals:
  - QF1: #3 vs. #6
  - QF2: #4 vs. #5
- Best-of-three semifinals:
  - SF1: #1 vs. QF2
  - SF2: #2 vs. QF1
- Third-place playoff: losers of the semifinals
- Best-of-five finals: winners of the semifinals

== Elimination round ==
=== Team standings ===
Pos	Team	W	L	PCT	GB	Qualification
1	Batang Red Bull Thunder	8	1	.889	—	Advance to semifinals
2	San Miguel Beermen	6	3	.667 (Note: Head-to-head record: San Miguel 1–0 Coca-Cola)	2	Advance to semifinals
3	Coca-Cola Tigers	6	3	.667	2	Advance to quarterfinals
4	Talk 'N Text Phone Pals	5	4	.556 (Note: Head-to-head record: Alaska 1–0 Talk 'N Text)	3	Advance to quarterfinals
5	Alaska Aces	5	4	.556	3	Advance to quarterfinals
6	Sta. Lucia Realtors	4	5	.444 (Note: Sixth-seed playoff: Sta. Lucia 70–69 Shell)	4	Advance to quarterfinals
7	Shell Velocity	4	5	.444	4	
8	Purefoods TJ Hotdogs	3	6	.333 (Note: Head-to-head record: Barangay Ginebra 1–0 Purefoods)	5	
9	Barangay Ginebra Kings	3	6	.333	5	
10	FedEx Express	1	8	.111	7	

Source: PBA.ph

== Sixth seed playoff ==
Viva TV

December 6

recap

Sta. Lucia Realtors 70, Shell Turbo Chargers 69

PhilSports Arena, Pasig

== Bracket ==
Quarterfinals (Single elimination)
4	Talk 'N Text	63
5	Alaska	82
3	Coca-Cola	64
6	Sta. Lucia	61

Semifinals (Best-of-3)
1	Red Bull	1
5	Alaska	2
2	San Miguel	1
3	Coca-Cola	2

Finals (Best-of-5)
5	Alaska	1
3	Coca-Cola	3
Third place
1	Red Bull	81
2	San Miguel	83

== Quarterfinals ==
=== (3) Coca-Cola vs. (6) Sta. Lucia ===
Viva TV

December 8

recap

Coca-Cola Tigers 64, Sta. Lucia Realtors 61

Araneta Coliseum, Quezon City

=== (4) Talk 'N Text vs. (5) Alaska ===
Viva TV

December 8

Talk 'N Text Phone Pals 63, Alaska Aces 82

Araneta Coliseum, Quezon City

== Semifinals ==
=== (1) Red Bull vs. (5) Alaska ===
Viva TV

December 11

recap

Red Bull Thunder 79, Alaska Aces 70

PhilSports Arena, Pasig

Viva TV

December 13

Red Bull Thunder 68, Alaska Aces 83

Araneta Coliseum, Quezon City

Viva TV

December 15

recap

Red Bull Thunder 71, Alaska Aces 80
Alaska wins series, 2–1

Araneta Coliseum, Quezon City

=== (2) San Miguel vs. (3) Coca Cola ===
Viva TV

December 11

San Miguel Beermen 62, Coca-Cola Tigers 76

PhilSports Arena, Pasig

Viva TV

December 13

recap

San Miguel Beermen 74, Coca-Cola Tigers 62

Araneta Coliseum, Quezon City

Viva TV

December 15

San Miguel Beermen 62, Coca-Cola Tigers 74
Coca-Cola wins series, 2–1

Araneta Coliseum, Quezon City

== Third place playoff ==
Viva TV

December 18

Red Bull Thunder 81, San Miguel Beermen 83

Cuneta Astrodome, Pasay

== Finals ==
Viva TV

December 18

Coca-Cola Tigers 67, Alaska Aces 70

Cuneta Astrodome, Pasay

Viva TV

December 20

Coca-Cola Tigers 72, Alaska Aces 69 (OT)

Araneta Coliseum, Quezon City

Viva TV

December 22

Coca-Cola Tigers 62, Alaska Aces 60 (OT)

Araneta Coliseum, Quezon City

Viva TV

December 25

Coca-Cola Tigers 78, Alaska Aces 63
Coca-Cola wins series, 3–1

Araneta Coliseum, Quezon City
