= TJ Manotoc =

Filipino sportscaster (born 1977)

- Born: Tomas Pijuan Manotoc Jr. March 10, 1977 (age 49)
- Education: Ateneo de Manila University (secondary); De La Salle University (college)
- Years active: 1999–present
- Title: Sportscaster, host
- Relatives: Tommy Manotoc (father); Aurora Pijuan (mother)
- Sports commentary career
- Genre: Play-by-play
- Sports: Basketball; Baseball; Football

Tomas "TJ" Pijuan Manotoc Jr. (Tagalog pronunciation: [mɐnɔˈtɔkʔ]; born March 10, 1977) is a Filipino sports television personality, sportscaster and sports journalist.

== Career ==
After graduating as a marketing student at De La Salle University, Manotoc joined the ABS-CBN Sports' coverage of Metropolitan Basketball Association.

Shortly, he left the MBA coverage to move on PBA on Viva TV. In the coverage team, he occasionally work with his father. He worked in PBA coverages on NBN/IBC consortium and ABC coverage until 2004.

From 2000 to 2003, he worked as a host on GMA's Unang Hirit. He also worked as host in some TV shows and specials such as Binibining Pilipinas, Magandang Umaga Pilipinas Trip ni TJ segment that talks about OFWs. He also worked on some ANC programs.

He later worked in UAAP basketball coverages, NBA Tagalog commentary, and in The Score.

Currently, he is working in Northern America as ABS-CBN's correspondent, and later as their bureau chief.

== Personal life ==
Manotoc's mother is Aurora Pijuan, a former beauty queen and Miss International 1970. His father was Tommy Manotoc, a golfer and PBA champion coach.

In 2018, he was featured on ANC, and Metro. On those features, he detailed that he was a depression survivor.
