= PBA on Viva TV =

Branding used for PBA telecasts on Viva TV

- Genre: PBA game telecast
- Developed by: Viva Sports
- Written by: Fidel Mangonon III
- Directed by: Dong Catimpuyan; Lee Japa; Raffy Romano
- Starring: various PBA on Viva TV commentators
- Country of origin: Philippines
- Original languages: Filipino; English

Production
- Executive producer: Dayana Garcia
- Producers: Julius Melo; Jane Santos; Mildred B. Montuano
- Camera setup: Multiple-camera setup
- Running time: 2 hours (airs Wednesdays and Fridays); 4 hours (airs Saturdays and Sundays)

Original release
- Network: IBC
- Release: February 20, 2000 – December 25, 2002

Related
- PBA on Vintage Sports; PBA on NBN/IBC

PBA on Viva TV is a Philippine television sports presentation show broadcast by IBC. It aired from February 20, 2000 to December 25, 2002. The consist of branding used for presentation of Philippine Basketball Association games produced by Viva Sports.

== History ==
In late 1999, Vintage Television was bought by media giant Viva Entertainment. Prior to the acquisition, Vintage Television have signed a three-year broadcast deal with the PBA earlier that year worth 770 million pesos. They defeated GMA Network, in its bid to enter into the sports broadcasting scene following ABS-CBN's coverage of the then-existing Metropolitan Basketball Association.

From 2000 to 2001, Viva TV broadcast PBA games on Sundays, Wednesdays and Fridays with out of town games covered on Saturdays either live, tape-delay or aired days later. In 2002, at Viva's request, the league scheduled its games on Tuesdays and Thursdays with one game from 6–8, and two double-headers on Saturdays and Sundays to accommodate the airing of the local version of two popular game shows that was also produced by them; (The Weakest Link and Who Wants to Be a Millionaire?). This led to a sudden decrease in ratings and the league shifted back its 2001 schedule at the start of the semifinals of the Commissioner's Cup.

Noli Eala and Ed Picson were the main play-by-play commentators from 2000 to 2002. However, Picson left the network at midseason following a fallout between him and the network. He would return to cover PBA games for the PBA on ABC broadcast in 2004.

At the end of the 2002 season, Viva left a significant amount of debt to the league. They tried to bid for a new contract with the league but was defeated by the NBN-IBC consortium.

Viva-TV aired its last PBA games on Christmas Day 2002 during Game 4 of the 2002 All-Filipino Cup between the Coca-Cola Tigers and the Alaska Aces. Incoming commissioner Noli Eala and Tommy Manotoc were the commentators for its last run.

== Music ==
Viva-TV used to continued theme music as from Vintage Sports in every season of the PBA games. The list of their main themes are as follows:

- Show Stunts by Elliot Bernstein
- Sweeps 1 by Elliot Bernstein

== Commentators ==
=== Play-by-play ===
- Noli Eala
- Mon Liboro
- Chino Trinidad
- Ed Picson
- Benjie Santiago
- Anthony Suntay
- Boom Gonzales
- Vitto Lazatin
- Noel Zarate

=== Analyst ===
- Quinito Henson
- Andy Jao
- TJ Manotoc
- Tommy Manotoc
- Ron Jacobs
- Ryan Gregorio
- Yeng Guiao
- Chot Reyes
- Leo Isaac
- Joel Banal
- Barry Pascua

=== Courtside reporters & Halftime Hosts ===
- Dong Alejar
- Paolo Trillo
- Chiqui Roa-Puno
- Jannelle So
- Benjie Santiago
- Charissa Litton
- Jackie Simpao
- Ronnie Nathanielsz
- Pia Arcangel

== See also ==
- Philippine Basketball Association
- PBA on RPTV

Preceded by PBA on Vintage Sports	PBA TV coverage partners 2000–2002	Succeeded by PBA on NBN; PBA on IBC
