= 2001 PBA Commissioner's Cup finals =

Team	Coach	Wins
Red Bull Thunder	Yeng Guiao	4
San Miguel Beermen	Jong Uichico	2
- Dates: August 12–24, 2001
- Television: Viva TV (IBC)
- Radio network: DZRV

PBA Commissioner's Cup finals chronology
- < 2000 2002 >

PBA finals chronology
- < 2001 All-Filipino 2001 Governors >

The 2001 PBA Commissioner's Cup finals was the best-of-7 championship series of the 2001 PBA Commissioner's Cup and the conclusion of the conference's playoffs. The Red Bull Thunder and San Miguel Beermen played for the 79th championship contested by the league.

Red Bull won the Commissioner's Cup title in only their second season and fifth conference. The Thunder defeated the Beermen, winners of five of the last six conferences, in game six for a 4-2 series victory.

Danny Ildefonso won on his second back-to-back season MVP in Commissioner's Cup.

Davonn Harp won on his first finals MVP in Commissioner's Cup finals.

== Series scoring summary ==
Team	Game 1	Game 2	Game 3	Game 4	Game 5	Game 6	Wins
Red Bull	80	92	91	72	79	75	4
San Miguel	78	86	100	88	77	69	2

== Games summary ==
=== Game 1 ===
Viva TV

August 12

recap

Red Bull Thunder 80, San Miguel Beermen 78
Scoring by quarter: 24-18, 21-27, 10-20, 25-13
Pts: Antonio Lang 32	Pts: Nate Johnson 26
Red Bull leads series, 1-0

Araneta Coliseum, Quezon City

The Thunder climbed from five points down, 73-78, after allowing the Beermen to dominate most of the second half. Antonio Lang and Davonn Harp hit three of their seven free throws in the final minute. San Miguel was nursing a 78-77 lead with 48 seconds left, after Danny Seigle missed a jumper in the ensuing play, Lang hit an undergoal stab from a Junthy Valenzuela pass and drew Nate Johnson's sixth foul with 5.1 seconds left. Red Bull was holding a 79-78 lead when Lang missed his bonus shot but Harp got the rebound, causing Olsen Racela to foul him with 3.5 seconds remaining, Harp made only his first. After a San Miguel timeout, Danny Seigle missed on a drive as time expired.

=== Game 2 ===
Viva TV

August 15

recap

Red Bull Thunder 92, San Miguel Beermen 86
Scoring by quarter: 23-18, 13-24, 31-18, 25-26
Pts: Junthy Valenzuela 25	Pts: Nate Johnson 24
Red Bull leads series, 2-0

Philsports Arena, Pasig

Junthy Valenzuela hit seven triples, five of them in the second half, to frustrate San Miguel. Antonio Lang also shone on Red Bull's free-wheeling offense, making 20 points and includes a highlight double-pump that drew a foul from Danny Ildefonso with 1:31 left that gave the Thunder an 85-76 lead. Lang's superb game got the ire of Nic Belasco, who hackled him underneath while taking a shot, causing a near free-for-all with eight minutes left in the game and Red Bull ahead, 74-66.

=== Game 3 ===
Viva TV

August 17

recap

Red Bull Thunder 91, San Miguel Beermen 100
Scoring by quarter: 19-23, 22-22, 32-26, 18-29
Pts: Junthy Valenzuela 22	Pts: Nate Johnson 31
Red Bull leads series, 2-1

Philsports Arena, Pasig

San Miguel's Danny Ildefonso, Danny Seigle and Olsen Racela hit their free throws in the closing minutes to deflect Junthy Valenzuela's torrid three-point shooting in the third and fourth quarters. Valenzuela's last triple put Red Bull to within 86-88 with 2:08 left, which turned out to be the Thunder's last stand as the Beermen tightened their defenses going into the homestretch.

=== Game 4 ===
Viva TV

August 19

recap

Red Bull Thunder 72, San Miguel Beermen 88
Scoring by quarter: 20-15, 10-23, 26-24, 16-26
Pts: Antonio Lang 24	Pts: Danny Seigle 26
series tied at 2-2

Araneta Coliseum, Quezon City

San Miguel rode to a 12-0 run in the fourth quarter, Boybits Victoria sparked the run with a three-pointer with eight minutes left in the game, giving the Beermen a 65-62 lead despite the foul trouble of Nate Johnson, who got his fifth with 7:51 left. The Thunder lost Junthy Valenzuela early in the first quarter as he was thrown out for elbowing Johnson.

=== Game 5 ===
Viva TV

August 22

Red Bull Thunder 79, San Miguel Beermen 77
Scoring by quarter: 25-26, 21-19, 18-14, 15-18
Pts: Davonn Harp 17	Pts: Nate Johnson 43
Red Bull leads series, 3-2

Araneta Coliseum, Quezon City
Attendance: 12,259

Red Bull threw a huge defensive blanket on San Miguel in the dying seconds to escape with a pulsating two-point victory. Willie Miller blocked Nate Johnson's point-blank attempt in the last 1.8 seconds, after getting the inbound pass from Dwight Lago in the shaded area. Johnson, who scored the largest output in the series with 43 points, was ganged up by Miller, Antonio Lang and Davonn Harp, confusion erupted after the final buzzer as players from both sides trash-talked their way to the dugout.

=== Game 6 ===
Viva TV

August 24

Red Bull Thunder 75, San Miguel Beermen 69
Scoring by quarter: 27-18, 17-23, 9-13, 22-15
Pts: Antonio Lang 26	Pts: Danny Seigle 22
Red Bull wins series, 4-2

Araneta Coliseum, Quezon City

San Miguel fell behind by 17 points in the second quarter, 18-35, but Danny Seigle orchestrated a comeback to keep the Beermen within striking distance. The Thunder outsteadied the Beermen in the endgame, from a 70-69 lead, Red Bull drew two points apiece from Davonn Harp and Ato Agustin before Antonio Lang's free throw iced Red Bull's title-clinching win. Junthy Valenzuela also stars when he blocked Danny Seigle's three-pointer in the closing seconds and then saved a sideline loose ball to preserve the victory. Davonn Harp won on his first sophomore Finals MVP and Batang Red Bull captures of this first championship crown title.

2001 PBA Commissioners Cup Champions

Red Bull Thunder
1st title

== Occurrences ==
Red Bull's Junthy Valenzuela was fined P40,000 but escaped suspension following a flagrant foul on San Miguel import Nate Johnson in Game 4 of the finals wherein he was thrown out of the ballgame as early in the first quarter, previous to that, Valenzuela's teammate Kerby Raymundo was suspended for one game in the series.

== Rosters ==
Red Bull Thunder roster
Players

Pos.	#	POB	Name	Height	Weight	DOB (YYYY–MM–DD)	From
G	3	(Philippines)	Jimwell Torion	5 ft 9 in (1.75 m)			SCSIT
F	4	(United States)	Davonn Harp	6 ft 4 in (1.93 m)			Kutztown
G	6	(Philippines)	Ato Agustin	5 ft 11 in (1.80 m)			Lyceum
F	7	(Australia)	Mick Pennisi	6 ft 9 in (2.06 m)			Eastern Michigan
F	8	(Philippines)	Lowell Briones	6 ft 3 in (1.91 m)			Visayas
F	9	(Philippines)	Jay Mendoza	6 ft 3 in (1.91 m)			Mapúa
F	10	(Philippines)	Junthy Valenzuela	6 ft 2 in (1.88 m)			SCSIT
G	11	(Philippines)	Willie Miller	5 ft 10 in (1.78 m)			Letran
G	13	(Philippines)	Anton Villoria	5 ft 11 in (1.80 m)			Letran
F	14	(Philippines)	Bernard Tanpua	6 ft 3 in (1.91 m)			UPHSD
F	15	(Philippines)	Lordy Tugade	6 ft 3 in (1.91 m)			National-U
F	20	(Philippines)	Edmund Reyes	6 ft 3 in (1.91 m)			UST
C	21	(Philippines)	Kerby Raymundo	6 ft 6 in (1.98 m)			Letran
F	42	(United States)	Antonio Lang (I)	6 ft 7 in (2.01 m)			Duke

Coaches

Head coach

- (Philippines) Yeng Guiao

Assistant coach(es)

- (Philippines) Roehl Nadurata
- (Philippines) Andy Jao

Legend

- (C) Team captain
- (I) Import
- Injured

San Miguel Beermen roster
Players

Pos.	#	POB	Name	Height	Weight	DOB (YYYY–MM–DD)	From
G	1	(Philippines)	Boybits Victoria	5 ft 10 in (1.78 m)			San Beda
C	3	(United States)	Nic Belasco	6 ft 6 in (1.98 m)			Notre Dame (OH)
C	6	(United States)	Dorian Peña	6 ft 6 in (1.98 m)			Coppin State
F	7	(Philippines)	Michael Mustre	6 ft 1 in (1.85 m)			Letran
F/C	10	(Philippines)	Danny Ildefonso	6 ft 6 in (1.98 m)			National-U
F	15	(Philippines)	Dwight Lago	6 ft 3 in (1.91 m)			De La Salle
G	17	(Philippines)	Olsen Racela	5 ft 10 in (1.78 m)			Ateneo
G	21	(Philippines)	Joey Mente	5 ft 11 in (1.80 m)			Lyceum
F/C	22	(Philippines)	Arnold Gamboa	6 ft 6 in (1.98 m)			Far Eastern
F		(Philippines)	Henry Fernandez	6 ft 1 in (1.85 m)			Visayas
F	24	(United States)	Nate Johnson (I)	6 ft 5 in (1.96 m)			Louisville
F	25	(Philippines)	Freddie Abuda	6 ft 4 in (1.93 m)			Visayas
F	32	(United States)	Rob Duat	6 ft 4 in (1.93 m)			Menlo
F	42	(United States)	Danny Seigle	6 ft 6 in (1.98 m)			Wagner

Coaches

Head coach

- (Philippines) Jong Uichico

Assistant coach(es)

- (Philippines) Siot Tanquingcen
- (Philippines) Arturo Dela Cruz

Legend

- (C) Team captain
- (I) Import
- Injured

== Broadcast notes ==
Game	Play-by-play	Analyst	Phone Interview	Courtside Reporters, Pre-Game and Halftime Hosts
Game 1	Noli Eala	Quinito Henson		
Game 2	Ed Picson	Chot Reyes	Perry Ronquillo	Paolo Trillo and Chiqui Roa-Puno
Game 3	Anthony Suntay	TJ Manotoc	Tim Cone	Paolo Trillo, Jannelle So and Ronnie Nathanielsz
Game 4	Noli Eala	Quinito Henson		
Game 5	Ed Picson	TJ Manotoc		
Game 6	Noli Eala	Quinito Henson		
