= 1993 PBA Governors' Cup finals =

Basketball tournament

Team	Coach	Wins
San Miguel Beermen	Norman Black	4
Swift Mighty Meaty Hotdogs	Yeng Guiao	1
- Dates: December 5–14, 1993
- Television: Vintage Sports (PTV)
- Radio network: DZAM

PBA Governors' Cup finals chronology
- 1994 >

PBA finals chronology
- < 1993 Commissioner's 1994 All-Filipino >

The 1993 PBA Governors' Cup finals was the best-of-7 basketball championship series of the 1993 PBA Governors' Cup, and the conclusion of the conference playoffs. The San Miguel Beermen and Swift Mighty Meaty Hotdogs played for the 56th championship contested by the league.

The San Miguel Beermen wins their tenth PBA title with a 4–1 series victory over Swift Mighty Meaty Hotdogs.

== Qualification ==
San Miguel		Swift
Finished 8–2 (.800), 1st	Eliminations	Finished 7–3 (.700), tied for 2nd
Finished 13–5 (.722), 1st	Semifinals	Finished 11–7 (.611), tied for 2nd
Finished 13–5 (.722), 1st	Playoff	Won two playoff matches vs Pepsi & Sta.Lucia

== Series scoring summary ==
Team	Game 1	Game 2	Game 3	Game 4	Game 5	Wins
San Miguel	140	109	124	109	91	4
Swift	138	122	110	104	89	1
Venue	Cuneta	Cuneta	Cuneta	Cuneta	Cuneta

== Games summary ==
=== Game 1 ===
Vintage

December 5

San Miguel Beermen 140, Swift Mighty Meaty Hotdogs 138 (2OT)
Pts: Travis 46 Agustin 27	Pts: Tony Harris 55
San Miguel leads series, 1–0

Cuneta Astrodome, Pasay

Kenny Travis deflected a pass by Tony Harris in Swift's final offensive with the Beermen up, 139–138, in the second overtime. Travis split his free throw then pressed hard on Harris, who lost the ball to Alvin Teng, allowing San Miguel to escaped with a win. The Meaties were down by 15 points early in the fourth period but they battled back and forces overtime at 116–116 on Tony Harris' buzzer-beating basket. The Beermen trailed 117–122 in the extension period when Kenny Travis hit back-to-back triples to give the lead back to San Miguel, 123–122, the Beermen had the game all but wrapped up at 127–124 when Vergel Meneses hit a triple at the buzzer forcing second overtime at 127-all.

=== Game 2 ===
Vintage

December 7

San Miguel Beermen 109, Swift Mighty Meaty Hotdogs 122
Pts: Kenny Travis 34	Pts: Harris 43 Asaytono 28
Series tied, 1–1

Cuneta Astrodome, Pasay

In an ugly clash of hotheads, Swift finally got back at San Miguel to level their series, Al Solis fired three triples while Nelson Asaytono pulled off a three-point play at the height of the Beermen's rally in the final stretch to seal the Meaties' first victory over San Miguel in this conference. The third quarter was marred by a free-for-all with Swift pulled ahead with its biggest lead, 89–71, both teams imports; Tony Harris and Kenny Travis, squared off on the Beermen's side of the court and play was stopped for nearly 15 minutes as players and officials spilled into the court and irate fans threw coins and other debris. Tony Harris, Kenny Travis, Art Dela Cruz and Rudy Distrito were thrown out of the game after being assessed fighting fouls and play resumed with the Meaties refusing to give in to the Beermen's relentless bid for a comeback. San Miguel came closest at 93–101 with still 7:47 left.

=== Game 3 ===
Vintage

December 10

San Miguel Beermen 124, Swift Mighty Meaty Hotdogs 110 (OT)
Pts: Kenny Travis 40	Pts: Tony Harris 54
San Miguel leads series, 2–1

Cuneta Astrodome, Pasay

San Miguel rallied from a deficit of 12 points, 71–83, to come within 84–85 with only few seconds remaining in the third quarter. Kenny Travis' slam on a fastbreak gave the Beermen the lead, 97–96, the wild crowd broke into uproar as Al Solis hit two triples, answering Allan Caidic's own trey for a 102–100 Swift edge. The Meaties went up by six, 108–102, but the Beermen countered with six straight points, forcing overtime. Kenny Travis stole the ball from Tony Harris with less than 20 seconds left to give the Beermen ball possession and protect the 108-all count at regulation.

Allan Caidic scored 10 points in overtime in a surprisingly lopsided extra period that saw San Miguel limited Swift to an all-time low two points in the five-minute extension. Caidic's triple with their shot clock expiring give the Beermen a 115–108 lead, six more points by the Beermen as they almost blanked the Meaties in overtime until Tony Harris was given a gimme slam on a fastbreak.

=== Game 4 ===
Vintage

December 12

San Miguel Beermen 109, Swift Mighty Meaty Hotdogs 104
Pts: Kenny Travis 35	Pts: Vergel Meneses 28
San Miguel leads series, 3–1

Cuneta Astrodome, Pasay

Tony Harris pulled his groin muscle with still 4:30 left in the first half, the Meaties trailing by two, 42–44, Harris left the game with still two quarters remaining. The all-Filipino Swift put up a gritty stand as they reeled from the early exit of Harris in the second period. San Miguel went up by ten, 106–96, in the fourth quarter from an 83-all deadlock going into the final period.

=== Game 5 ===
Vintage

December 14

San Miguel Beermen 91, Swift Mighty Meaty Hotdogs 89
Pts: Kenny Travis 34	Pts: Al Solis 23
San Miguel wins series, 4–1

Cuneta Astrodome, Pasay

The Beermen held the Meaties scoreless in the final 49.5 seconds and Samboy Lim providing the marginal points from the free-throw line. Swift was leading, 89–86, and after Samboy Lim made his two charities, Yves Dignadice forced Nelson Asaytono to loose the ball twice until Kenny Travis completed a fine defensive stop by stealing off a driving Vergel Meneses. On a fastbreak, Samboy Lim was fouled by Nelson Asaytono, sending him to the free throw line for a go-ahead charities, 90–89, with time down to 14.4 seconds. Swift coach Yeng Guiao sued for time but the Meaties lost ball possession in the ensuing play when Dignadice hounded Asaytono into committing a travelling violation. Allan Caidic was fouled and split his free throws, the Beermen then foiled the Meaties' last two tries at the basket with Harris missing a turnaround jumper from 18-feet as time expired.

1993 PBA Governors Cup Champions

San Miguel Beermen
10th title

== Rosters ==
San Miguel Beermen roster
Players
Coaches

Pos.	No.	Nat.	Name	Ht.	Wt.
G/F	1	(Philippines)	Bong Ravena	6 ft 1 in (1.85 m)		UE
G	5	(Philippines)	Franz Pumaren	5 ft 9 in (1.75 m)		De La Salle
G	6	(Philippines)	Ato Agustin	5 ft 11 in (1.80 m)		Lyceum
F	8	(Philippines)	Allan Caidic	6 ft 2 in (1.88 m)		UE
F	9	(Philippines)	Samboy Lim	6 ft 0 in (1.83 m)		Letran
F	10	(Philippines)	Alvin Teng	6 ft 4 in (1.93 m)		Arellano
G	11	(Philippines)	Biboy Ravanes	6 ft 0 in (1.83 m)		Cebu
F	12	(Philippines)	Yves Dignadice	6 ft 4 in (1.93 m)		STI WNU
G	14	(Philippines)	Hector Calma	5 ft 9 in (1.75 m)		Adamson
F	18	(Philippines)	Art Dela Cruz	6 ft 2 in (1.88 m)		San Sebastian
F/C	19	(Philippines)	Ramon Fernandez	6 ft 4 in (1.93 m)		San Carlos
C	20	(Philippines)	Adriano Polistico	6 ft 7 in (2.01 m)		Letran
G/F	21	(United States)	Kenny Travis (I)	6 ft 1 in (1.85 m)		New Mexico State

Head coach

- (United States) Norman Black

Assistant coach(es)

- (Philippines) Jong Uichico
- (Philippines) Pilo Pumaren

Legend

- (C) Team captain
- (I) Import
- Injured

Swift Mighty Meaties roster
Players
Coaches

Pos.	No.	Nat.	Name	Ht.	Wt.
G	8	(Philippines)	Al Solis	5 ft 11 in (1.80 m)		Visayas
F	10	(Philippines)	Eric Reyes	6 ft 4 in (1.93 m)		Ateneo
F	11	(Philippines)	Nelson Asaytono	6 ft 3 in (1.91 m)		Manila
C	12	(Philippines)	Bonel Balingit	6 ft 9 in (2.06 m)		Visayas
F	13	(Philippines)	Elpidio Villamin	6 ft 2 in (1.88 m)
G	14	(Philippines)	Rudy Distrito	5 ft 11 in (1.80 m)		UE
G	15	(Philippines)	Juancho Estrada	5 ft 11 in (1.80 m)		Adamson
G	16	(Philippines)	Marcelino Albarillo	5 ft 10 in (1.78 m)		Mindanao
F	17	(Philippines)	Terry Saldaña	6 ft 3 in (1.91 m)		Letran
F	18	(Philippines)	Vergel Meneses	6 ft 3 in (1.91 m)		José Rizal
G/F	22	(United States)	Tony Harris (I)	6 ft 2 in (1.88 m)		LSU New Orleans
C	35	(Philippines)	Zaldy Realubit	6 ft 6 in (1.98 m)		USJ-R
F	48	(Philippines)	Cadel Mosqueda	6 ft 3 in (1.91 m)		Arellano

Head coach

- (Philippines) Yeng Guiao

Assistant coach(es)

- (Philippines) Roehl Nadurata
- (Philippines) Bong Go

Legend

- (C) Team captain
- (I) Import
- Injured

== Occurrences ==
A total of nine players were fined in the aftermath of the Game two brawl that left at least two spectators wounded, no suspensions were meted out by the Commissioner's office. Kenny Travis was fined P10,000 and Tony Harris P5,000, as the principal figures of the bench-emptying free-for-all that occurred in the third quarter of Game two, Travis was slapped with the heftier fine for instigating the fight, however, Harris was fined another P5,000 for approaching the Commissioner's row to berate officials over his ejection from the game.

== Broadcast notes ==
Game	Play-by-play	Analyst	Courtside reporters
Game 1	Ed Picson	Quinito Henson	Butch Maniego and Jim Kelly
Game 2	Sev Sarmenta	Andy Jao	Ronnie Nathanielsz
Game 3	Ed Picson	Quinito Henson	
Game 4			
Game 5	Sev Sarmenta	Andy Jao	
