= 1999 PBA All-Filipino Cup finals =

Basketball championship finals

| Team | Coach | Wins |
|---|---|---|
| Formula Shell | Perry Ronquillo | 4 |
| Tanduay Rhum Masters | Alfrancis Chua | 2 |
- Dates: May 23 – June 6, 1999
- Television: VTV (IBC)
- Radio network: DZRV

PBA All-Filipino Cup finals chronology
- < 1998 2000 >

PBA finals chronology
- < 1998 Governors 1999 Commissioner's >

The 1999 McDonald's PBA All-Filipino Cup finals was the best-of-7 basketball championship series of the 1999 PBA All-Filipino Cup, and the conclusion of the conference playoffs. The Formula Shell Zoom Masters and Tanduay Rhum Masters played for the 72nd championship contested by the league.

Formula Shell captured the All-Filipino Cup crown, becoming the 10th team to win the league's most prestigious tournament, defeating Tanduay Rhum Masters, four games to two, for their fourth championship and repeated as back-to-back champions.

== Qualification ==
| Tanduay | | Shell |
|---|---|---|
| Finished 9–7 (.563), 3rd seed | Eliminations | Finished 9–7 (.563), 4th seed |
| defeated 6th seed Pop Cola | Quarterfinals | defeated 5th seed San Miguel |
| defeated Alaska, 3–1 | Best-of-5 semifinals | defeated Brgy.Ginebra, 3–0 |

== Series scoring summary ==
| Team | Game 1 | Game 2 | Game 3 | Game 4 | Game 5 | Game 6 | Wins |
|---|---|---|---|---|---|---|---|
| Formula Shell | 84 | 79 | 91 | 65 | 75 | 85 | 4 |
| Tanduay Gold | 91 | 76 | 81 | 87 | 68 | 76 | 2 |

== Games summary ==
=== Game 1 ===
VTV

May 23

Formula Shell 84, Tanduay Rhum Masters 91
| Pts: Benjie Paras 27 |
Tanduay leads series, 1–0

PhilSports Arena, Pasig

Shell erased a 14-point deficit to grab the lead at 61–60. The Rhum Masters showed composure and held their ground to wore the Turbo Chargers in the endgame. Bobby Jose chipped in 19 points, including two layups that broke the backs of the rallying Shell. Alvarado and Menk were held to a combined output of 44 points by the Shell defenders.

=== Game 2 ===
VTV

May 26

Formula Shell 79, Tanduay Rhum Masters 76
Series tied, 1–1

Araneta Coliseum, Quezon City

Shell rallied from 18 points down in the fourth quarter in a come-from-behind victory. The Zoom Masters were down, 49–63, entering the final period. Four straight points by the Rhum Masters gave them their biggest lead at 67–49.

=== Game 3 ===
VTV

May 30

Formula Shell 91, Tanduay Rhum Masters 81
| Pts: Victor Pablo 27 | Pts: Eric Menk 42 |
Shell leads series, 2–1

Ormoc Superdome, Ormoc

From a slim 70–69 advantage for Shell in the fourth quarter, Victor Pablo scored seven straight points that started an 8–3 run for the Zoom Masters which gave them a six-point edge, 78–72. Tanduay forward Sonny Alvarado was called for his sixth foul and a technical. A three-point shot by Noy Castillo put Shell on top by seven points at 83–76. Rookie Eric Menk scored 42 big points for the Rhum Masters.

=== Game 4 ===
VTV

June 2

Formula Shell 65, Tanduay Rhum Masters 87
| Pts: Benjie Paras 21 | Pts: Sonny Alvarado 28 |
Series tied, 2–2

PhilSports Arena, Pasig

Sonny Alvarado keyed Tanduay's huge run that padded a 40–34 halftime lead to a 55–42 bulge. The Rhum Masters' defense limited Shell to a lone basket in the first seven minutes of the fourth quarter with Alvarado, Eric Menk and Jason Webb chipped in baskets of their own, giving Tanduay their biggest lead at 72–48.

=== Game 5 ===
VTV

June 4

Formula Shell 75, Tanduay Rhum Masters 68
Shell leads series, 3–2

Araneta Coliseum, Quezon City

Shell found a hero in Gerald Esplana, who scored 14 points in the fourth quarter alone and wound up with 25 points.

=== Game 6 ===
VTV

June 6

Formula Shell 85, Tanduay Rhum Masters 76
Shell wins series, 4–2

Araneta Coliseum, Quezon City

Benjie Paras and Victor Pablo scored 23 and 21 points respectively, Rhum Masters' Sonny Alvarado, who had a triple-double of 18 points, 13 rebounds and 10 assists, was ejected with 3:57 to go due to two technical fouls.

1999 PBA All-Filipino Cup Champions

Formula Shell
Fourth title

== Rosters ==
Formula Shell Zoom Masters roster
Players

| Pos. | # | POB | Name | Height | Weight | DOB (YYYY–MM–DD) | From |
|---|---|---|---|---|---|---|---|
| G | 1 | (United States) | Dennis Harrison | 6 ft 2 in (1.88 m) | | | Hawaiʻi |
| F | 3 | (United States) | Chris Jackson | 6 ft 4 in (1.93 m) | | | San Bernardino Valley |
| G | 4 | (United States) | Noy Castillo | 6 ft 0 in (1.83 m) | | | The Citadel |
| G | 6 | (Philippines) | Arnold Rodriguez | 6 ft 1 in (1.85 m) | | | PUP |
| F | 9 | (Philippines) | Jay Mendoza | 6 ft 4 in (1.93 m) | | | Mapúa |
| C | 11 | (Philippines) | Erwin Luna | 6 ft 7 in (2.01 m) | | | Adamson |
| G | 12 | (Philippines) | Porferio Marzan | 6 ft 2 in (1.88 m) | | | Baguio |
| C | 14 | (Philippines) | Benjie Paras | 6 ft 5 in (1.96 m) | | | Philippines |
| F | 19 | (Philippines) | Joel Dualan | 6 ft 3 in (1.91 m) | | | Manila |
| G | 30 | (Philippines) | Gerry Esplana | 5 ft 11 in (1.80 m) | | | Far Eastern |
| G | 31 | (United States) | Rommel Santos | 5 ft 11 in (1.80 m) | | | Staten Island |
| F | 33 | (Philippines) | Victor Pablo | 6 ft 4 in (1.93 m) | | | Far Eastern |

Coaches
Head coach
- (Philippines) Perry Ronquillo
Assistant(s)
- (Philippines) Joey Guanio

Legend
- (DP) Unsigned draft pick
- (FA) Free agent
- (S) Suspended
- Injured

Tanduay Rhum Masters roster
Players

| Pos. | # | POB | Name | Height | Weight | DOB (YYYY–MM–DD) | From |
|---|---|---|---|---|---|---|---|
| G | 1 | (Philippines) | Jason Webb | 6 ft 2 in (1.88 m) | | | De La Salle |
| G | 7 | (Philippines) | Jomer Rubi | 5 ft 7 in (1.70 m) | | | UPHSD |
| F | 11 | (Philippines) | Bobby Jose | 6 ft 3 in (1.91 m) | | | UST |
| F | 12 | (Philippines) | Alvin Magpantay | 6 ft 3 in (1.91 m) | | | De La Salle |
| F/C | 13 | (Philippines) | Mark Telan | 6 ft 6 in (1.98 m) | | | De La Salle |
| F/C | 15 | (Puerto Rico) | Sonny Alvarado | 6 ft 7 in (2.01 m) | | | Texas-Austin |
| G | 16 | (Philippines) | Derick Bughao | 5 ft 8 in (1.73 m) | | | Visayas |
| G | 18 | (Philippines) | Rene Alforque | 5 ft 10 in (1.78 m) | | | Cebu |
| G/F | 22 | (Philippines) | Jayvee Gayoso | 6 ft 2 in (1.88 m) | | | Ateneo |
| G | 25 | (Philippines) | Pido Jarencio | 5 ft 10 in (1.78 m) | | | UST |
| C | 30 | (United States) | Eric Menk | 6 ft 6 in (1.98 m) | | | Lake Superior State |
| F/C | 33 | (Philippines) | Chris Cantonjos | 6 ft 6 in (1.98 m) | | | UST |

Coaches
Head coach
- (Philippines) Alfrancis Chua
Assistant(s)
- (Philippines) Angelito Esguerra
- (Philippines) Lawrence Chongson

Legend
- (DP) Unsigned draft pick
- (FA) Free agent
- (S) Suspended
- Injured

== Broadcast notes ==
| Game | Play-by-play | Analyst | Courtside Reporters | Pre-Game Hosts |
|---|---|---|---|---|
| Game 1 | Noli Eala | Quinito Henson | Dong Alejar and Anthony Suntay | |
| Game 2 | Ed Picson | Andy Jao | Dong Alejar | Anthony Suntay and Chiqui Roa-Puno |
| Game 3 | Chino Trinidad | Yeng Guiao | None | None |
| Game 4 | Noli Eala | Quinito Henson | Mon Liboro and Dong Alejar | Anthony Suntay and Chiqui Roa-Puno |
| Game 5 | | | | |
| Game 6 | Ed Picson | Andy Jao | | |
