= 2001 PBA Governors' Cup finals =

2001 edition of the PBA Governors' Cup finals

2001 PBA Governors Cup finals
Team	Coach	Wins
Sta. Lucia Realtors	Norman Black	4
San Miguel Beermen	Jong Uichico	2
- Dates: December 5–16, 2001
- MVP: Gerald Francisco
- Television: Viva TV (IBC)
- Radio network: DZRV

PBA Governors Cup finals chronology
- < 2000 2002 >

PBA finals chronology
- < 2002 Commissioner's 2002 Governors >

The 2001 PBA Governor's Cup finals was the best-of-7 championship series of the 2001 PBA Governor's Cup and the conclusion of the conference's playoffs. The Sta. Lucia Realtors and San Miguel Beermen played for the 80th championship contested by the league.

Sta. Lucia Realtors captured their first-ever PBA title after 8 years of participation in the league, winning over defending champions San Miguel Beermen in six games.

Gerald Francisco won his first finals MVP in Governors Cup finals.

== Series scoring summary ==
Team	Game 1	Game 2	Game 3	Game 4	Game 5	Game 6	Wins
Sta.Lucia	86	78	83	73	85	75	4
San Miguel	80	86	74	106	71	72	2

== Games summary ==
=== Game 1 ===
Viva TV

December 5

recap

Sta. Lucia Realtors 86, San Miguel Beermen 80
Scoring by quarter: 22–18, 17–20, 29–19, 18–23
Pts: Damien Owens 18	Pts: Lamont Strothers 25
Sta.Lucia leads series, 1–0

Araneta Coliseum, Quezon City

Damien Owens watched his teammates handled the offensive chores in the third quarter where Marlou Aquino, Dennis Espino and Paolo Mendoza shown, when San Miguel's hardworking import Lamont Strothers' shooting suddenly fell silent, the Realtors dealt the finishing blows as Owens drained a shot-clock beating jumper and Gerard Francisco canned a triple in the last three minutes.

=== Game 2 ===
Viva TV

December 7

recap

Sta. Lucia Realtors 78, San Miguel Beermen 86
Scoring by quarter: 22–20, 12–24, 20–13, 24–29
Pts: Damien Owens 22	Pts: Lamont Strothers 29
series tied at 1–1

Philsports Arena, Pasig

Danny Seigle connected mostly from the shaded area in the final quarter and Lamont Strothers knocked in two key straight baskets as the Beermen pulled even in the series.

=== Game 3 ===
Viva TV

December 9

recap

Sta. Lucia Realtors 83, San Miguel Beermen 74
Scoring by quarter: 19–16, 29–19, 12–20, 23–19
Pts: Damien Owens 32	Pts: Lamont Strothers 25
Sta.Lucia leads series, 2–1

Araneta Coliseum, Quezon City

Damien Owens knocked in a game-high 32 points, 14 of which came in the second half. The Realtors had a big run late in the second period, Gerard Francisco hit a buzzer-beating triple to give Sta.Lucia a 48–35 margin at halftime.

=== Game 4 ===
Viva TV

December 12

recap

Sta. Lucia Realtors 73, San Miguel Beermen 106
Pts: Damien Owens 20	Pts: Lamont Strothers 38
series tied at 2–2

Philsports Arena, Pasig

Lamont Strothers poured 18 of his game-high 38 points in the second quarter and went 4-of-4 from the three-point range as the Beermen built an insurmountable 58–35 lead at the half. The winning margin was the third most lopsided win in PBA finals history.

=== Game 5 ===
Viva TV

December 14

Sta. Lucia Realtors 85, San Miguel Beermen 71
Pts: Damien Owens 37
Sta.Lucia leads series, 3–2

Araneta Coliseum, Quezon City

Struggling and groping for form in the first half, the Realtors recovered at the start of the third quarter. Damien Owens bounced back from a poor performance in Game four, firing 13 points in the endgame to finish with 37 points.

=== Game 6 ===
Viva TV

December 16

Sta. Lucia Realtors 75, San Miguel Beermen 72
Scoring by quarter: 25–18, 17–15, 16–17, 17–22
Pts: Dennis Espino 17	Pts: Lamont Strothers 25 Danny Seigle 25
Sta.Lucia wins series, 4–2

Araneta Coliseum, Quezon City

With the score tied at 72-all, only 3.3 seconds remaining, Chris Tan, who went 0-of-8 from the three-point area in the entire best-of-seven series, made the shot of his life, unleashed a triple that swished the net as the Realtors ended a nine-year title-drought and win their first championship. Gerald Francisco won on his first Finals MVP and Sta. Lucia captures win on his 1st championship title.

2001 PBA Governors Cup Champions

Sta. Lucia Realtors
1st title

== Rosters ==
Sta. Lucia Realtors roster
Players

Pos.	#	POB	Name	Height	Weight	DOB (YYYY–MM–DD)	From
G	1	(Philippines)	Chris Tan	6 ft 1 in (1.85 m)	199 lb (90 kg)		De La Salle
G	4	(Philippines)	Gerardo Santiago	5 ft 10 in (1.78 m)	175 lb (79 kg)		Mapúa
C	7	(Philippines)	Richard del Rosario	6 ft 5 in (1.96 m)	215 lb (98 kg)		De La Salle
G	8	(Philippines)	Paolo Mendoza	5 ft 11 in (1.80 m)	165 lb (75 kg)		Philippines
G	9	(Philippines)	Francis Adriano	6 ft 0 in (1.83 m)	170 lb (77 kg)		Far Eastern
G/F	11	(Philippines)	Gerard Francisco	6 ft 3 in (1.91 m)	210 lb (95 kg)		UST
C	13	(Philippines)	Marlou Aquino	6 ft 9 in (2.06 m)	215 lb (98 kg)		Adamson
F	15	(Philippines)	Noynoy Falcasantos	6 ft 4 in (1.93 m)	180 lb (82 kg)		Cebu
F/C	16	(Philippines)	Dennis Espino	6 ft 6 in (1.98 m)	215 lb (98 kg)		UST
F	17	(Philippines)	Michael Orquillas	6 ft 2 in (1.88 m)	170 lb (77 kg)		Cebu
C	18	(Philippines)	Marvin Ortiguerra	6 ft 5 in (1.96 m)	210 lb (95 kg)		UST
G	24	(United States)	Damian Owens (I)	6 ft 4 in (1.93 m)	215 lb (98 kg)		West Virginia
G	42	(Philippines)	Donbel Belano	5 ft 8 in (1.73 m)	178 lb (81 kg)		Visayas

Coaches
Head coach
- (Philippines) Norman Black
Assistant(s)
- (Philippines) Alfrancis Chua
- (Philippines) Adonis Tierra
- (Philippines) Franz Pumaren

Legend
- (DP) Unsigned draft pick
- (FA) Free agent
- (S) Suspended
- (I) Import
- Injured

San Miguel Beermen roster
Players

Pos.	#	POB	Name	Height	Weight	DOB (YYYY–MM–DD)	From
G	1	(Philippines)	Boybits Victoria	5 ft 10 in (1.78 m)			San Beda
C	3	(United States)	Nic Belasco	6 ft 6 in (1.98 m)			Notre Dame (OH)
C	6	(United States)	Dorian Peña	6 ft 6 in (1.98 m)			Coppin State
F/C	10	(Philippines)	Danny Ildefonso	6 ft 6 in (1.98 m)			National-U
F	15	(Philippines)	Dwight Lago	6 ft 3 in (1.91 m)			De La Salle
G	17	(Philippines)	Olsen Racela	5 ft 10 in (1.78 m)			Ateneo
G	21	(Philippines)	Joey Mente	5 ft 11 in (1.80 m)			Lyceum
F/C	22	(Philippines)	Arnold Gamboa	6 ft 6 in (1.98 m)			Far Eastern
F		(Philippines)	Henry Fernandez	6 ft 1 in (1.85 m)			Visayas
F	25	(Philippines)	Freddie Abuda	6 ft 4 in (1.93 m)			Visayas
F	32	(United States)	Rob Duat	6 ft 4 in (1.93 m)			Menlo
G	33	(United States)	Lamont Strothers (I)	6 ft 2 in (1.88 m)			Christopher Newport
F	42	(United States)	Danny Seigle	6 ft 6 in (1.98 m)			Wagner

Coaches
Head coach
- (Philippines) Jong Uichico
Assistant(s)
- (Philippines) Siot Tanquingcen
- (Philippines) Arturo Dela Cruz

Legend
- (DP) Unsigned draft pick
- (FA) Free agent
- (S) Suspended
- (I) Import
- Injured

== Broadcast notes ==
Game	Play-by-play	Analyst	Courtside Reporters & Halftime Hosts
Game 1	Noli Eala	Quinito Henson	
Game 2	Ed Picson	Andy Jao	
Game 3	Ed Picson	Tommy Manotoc	Chiqui Roa-Puno and Ronnie Nathanielsz
Game 4			
Game 5			
Game 6	Noli Eala	Quinito Henson	Chiqui Roa-Puno and Ronnie Nathanielsz
