= Vintage Television =

Philippine media company

- Logo used from 1982 to 1996
- Industry: Television
- Genre: Sports programming
- Founded: 1978; 48 years ago
- Defunct: 1999; 27 years ago
- Fate: Absorbed by Viva Entertainment
- Key people: Bobong Velez (President and CEO)
- Owners: Bobong Velez

Vintage Television (VTV) (officially known as Vintage Enterprises, Inc. and mostly known as Vintage Sports) was a Philippine media company and was best known as the TV coverage partner of Philippine Basketball Association from 1982 to 1999. It was acquired by Philippine media giant Viva Entertainment in late 1999. It was also famed for its weekly boxing show called Blow by Blow during the 1990s, which began the popularity of professional boxer eight-division world champion Manny Pacquiao.

== History ==
In 1978, Vintage Enterprises was founded by the brothers Carlos "Bobong" Vélez and Ricky Vélez. Its first major program was the coverage of the Philippine Basketball Association games in 1982. The games were initially aired at City 2 Television/BBC from 1982 to 1985, then transferred to the People's Television Network in 1986 after BBC was sequestered by the government after the People Power Revolution and its frequencies were returned to ABS-CBN upon its reopening a few months later. Other shows like Blow by Blow and Hot Stuff began airing in 1994.

Vintage Enterprises transferred to the Intercontinental Broadcasting Corporation for launching of VTV Primetime block in 1996. It was renamed Vintage Television in 1998 and produced more programs for IBC. The company was acquired by media giant Viva Entertainment in 1999 following the effects of the 1997 Asian financial crisis, making the Velez group being part of the Viva Entertainment group with Viva as surviving entity, In 2000, Vintage Television was renamed as Viva TV as the primetime sports and entertainment block on IBC, at this time it also known as corporate name, Viva-Vintage Sports Inc. until March 1, 2003.

== Final programming ==
- Blow by Blow
- Elorde sa Trese
- Extreme Games
- Golf Watch
- Gillette World of Sports
- Hot Stuff
- KKK: Kabayo, Karera, Karerista
- Marlboro Tour
- NBA Jam
- NBA on Vintage Sports
- NCAA on Vintage Sports
- PBA Classics on Vintage Sports
- PBA on Vintage Sports
- PBL on Vintage Sports
- Strictly Dancesport
- Super Bouts
- Super Champs

== Sports broadcasters ==
=== Final on-air staff ===
- Joe Cantada
- Pinggoy Pengson
- Noli Eala
- Jimmy Javier
- Mon Liboro
- Ronnie Nathanielsz
- Ed Picson
- Randy Sacdalan
- Benjie Santiago
- Sev Sarmenta
- Chino Trinidad
- Bill Velasco
- Norman Black
- Tim Cone
- Alfrancis Chua
- Rado Dimalibot
- Yeng Guiao
- Quinito Henson
- Andy Jao
- Steve Kattan
- Butch Maniego
- Joaqui Trillo
- Freddie Webb
- Jim Kelly
- Noy Castillo
- Barry Pascua
- Noel Zarate
- Ronith Ang-Cogswell
- Anthony Suntay
- Dong Alejar
- Chiqui Roa-Puno
- Jannelle So
- Paolo Trillo
- Jun Bernardino
- Romy Kintanar
- Danny Sembrano
- Katherine De Leon-Villar
- Anna Amigo
- Mylene Quinto
- Michelle Tuazon
- Yell Aguila
- Ria Tanjuanco-Trillo
- Seppie Cristobal
- Ina Raymundo
- Ronnie Magsanoc

== TV partners ==
- City2 Television (1982–1983)
- Maharlika Broadcasting System / People's Television Network (1984–1995)
- Intercontinental Broadcasting Corporation (1996–1999)
- ESPN Philippines (1997–1999)

== See also ==
- Viva Television
