= 2000 PBA All-Filipino Cup finals =

Basketball cup finals

Team	Coach	Wins
Alaska Milkmen	Tim Cone	4
Purefoods TJ Hotdogs	Derrick Pumaren	1
- Dates: June 2–11, 2000
- Television: Viva TV (IBC)
- Radio network: DZRV

PBA All-Filipino Cup finals chronology
- < 1999 2001 >

PBA finals chronology
- < 1999 Governors 2000 Commissioner's >

The 2000 PBA All-Filipino Cup finals was the best-of-7 championship series of the 2000 PBA All-Filipino Cup and the conclusion of the conference's playoffs. The Alaska Milkmen and Purefoods Tender Juicy Hotdogs played for the 75th championship contested by the league.

The Alaska Milkmen won their third All-Filipino crown in the last five years with a 4–1 series victory over Purefoods TJ Hotdogs. The title-conquest was their 10th championship as Alaska is now the third most successful ballclub in the league.

Poch Juinio won on his first finals MVP in All-Filipino Cup finals.

== Series scoring summary ==
Team	Game 1	Game 2	Game 3	Game 4	Game 5	Wins
Alaska	59	93	79	88	85	4
Purefoods	73	76	71	75	84	1

== Games summary ==
=== Game 1 ===
Viva TV

June 2

Alaska Milkmen 59, Purefoods TJ Hotdogs 73
Scoring by quarter: 12–16, 17–12, 25–19, 5–26
Pts: Kenneth Duremdes 16	Pts: Boyet Fernandez 19

Philsports Arena, Pasig

The milkmen were held to a finals low five points in the fourth quarter. From a 54–47 lead entering the final period, the milkmen went scoreless as Boyet Fernandez of Purefoods drilled in three triples that spark a 19–0 windup in the last 7:01.

=== Game 2 ===
Viva TV

June 4

Alaska Milkmen 93, Purefoods TJ Hotdogs 76

Araneta Coliseum, Quezon City

Alaska led 43–35 at halftime. The milkmen leads by as many as 25 points in the 3rd quarter and coast to an easy victory.

=== Game 3 ===
Viva TV

June 7

Alaska Milkmen 79, Purefoods TJ Hotdogs 71
Scoring by quarter: 15–14, 20–26, 20–13, 24–18
Pts: Kenneth Duremdes 26	Pts: Andy Seigle 26

Ynares Center, Antipolo

Bong Hawkins' three-point play off Rey Evangelista broke a 71-all deadlock as Alaska completed a second half comeback.

=== Game 4 ===
Viva TV

June 9

Alaska Milkmen 88, Purefoods TJ Hotdogs 75

Philsports Arena, Pasig

Purefoods came close to within five points in the third period after being down by as many as 23 points. Alvin Patrimonio scored 10 of the hotdogs' 30 points in that quarter. Rodney Santos' timely jumpers in the fourth quarter put the game away and gave Alaska a 3–1 series lead.

=== Game 5 ===
Viva TV

June 11

Alaska Milkmen 85, Purefoods TJ Hotdogs 84
Scoring by quarter: 20–27, 24–21, 14–18, 27–18
Pts: Kenneth Duremdes 19	Pts: Alvin Patrimonio 22
Alaska wins series, 4–1

Araneta Coliseum, Quezon City

The hotdogs led at 66–58 after three quarters. Rodney Santos and Poch Juinio teamed up for 16 points in the fourth quarter to rally the milkmen from six points down to lead 73–71. Johnny Abarrientos hit a long jumper with 14.9 seconds to go to give Alaska an 85–82 cushion. Purefoods' Noy Castillo made two free throws for the final count as the milkmen missed all its four gift shots, including a pair from James Walkvist with 0.5 seconds left. Poch Juinio won his first Finals MVP and Alaska captures win on his 10th championship title.

2000 PBA All-Filipino Cup Champions

Alaska Milkmen
10th title

== Rosters ==
Alaska Milkmen roster
Players

Pos.	#	POB	Name	Height	Weight	DOB (YYYY–MM–DD)	From
F	3	(Philippines)	Glen Peter Yap	6 ft 3 in (1.91 m)			Adamson
G	5	(Philippines)	Gilbert Reyes	5 ft 8 in (1.73 m)			Ateneo
C	8	(Philippines)	Don Allado	6 ft 6 in (1.98 m)			De La Salle
G	9	(Philippines)	Rodney Santos	6 ft 1 in (1.85 m)			San Sebastian
G	11	(Philippines)	Dino Aldeguer	5 ft 10 in (1.78 m)			De La Salle
G	14	(Philippines)	Johnny Abarrientos	5 ft 8 in (1.73 m)			Far Eastern
F	16	(Philippines)	Bong Hawkins	6 ft 4 in (1.93 m)			UPHSD
C	17	(Philippines)	Kevin Ramas	6 ft 6 in (1.98 m)			Mapúa
G/F	19	(Philippines)	Kenneth Duremdes	6 ft 3 in (1.91 m)			Adamson
F	21	(Philippines)	Bryan Gahol	6 ft 4 in (1.93 m)			Philippines
C	22	(United States)	James Walkvist	6 ft 9 in (2.06 m)
C	32	(Philippines)	Poch Juinio	6 ft 5 in (1.96 m)			Philippines

Coaches
Head coach
- (United States) Tim Cone
Assistant(s)
- (Philippines) Gilbert Reyes
- (Philippines) Richard Bachmann
- (Philippines) Luigi Trillo

Legend
- (DP) Unsigned draft pick
- (FA) Free agent
- (S) Suspended
- Injured

Purefoods Tender Juicy Hotdogs roster
Players

Pos.	#	POB	Name	Height	Weight	DOB (YYYY–MM–DD)	From
F	2	(Philippines)	Richard Yee	6 ft 4 in (1.93 m)			UST
F	3	(Philippines)	Braulio Lim	6 ft 3 in (1.91 m)			UE
G	4	(Philippines)	Jessie Cabanayan	5 ft 8 in (1.73 m)			Baguio
G	6	(Philippines)	Boyet Fernandez	5 ft 8 in (1.73 m)			San Agustin
F	7	(Philippines)	Rey Evangelista	6 ft 3 in (1.91 m)			UST
G	10	(Philippines)	Dindo Pumaren	5 ft 9 in (1.75 m)			De La Salle
C	11	(Philippines)	Edward Joseph Feihl	7 ft 1 in (2.16 m)			Adamson
F	16	(Philippines)	Alvin Patrimonio	6 ft 3 in (1.91 m)			Mapúa
G	24	(Philippines)	Rommel Daep	6 ft 2 in (1.88 m)			San Sebastian
G	40	(United States)	Noy Castillo	6 ft 0 in (1.83 m)			The Citadel
C	52	(United States)	Andy Seigle	6 ft 9 in (2.06 m)			LSU New Orleans

Coaches
Head coach
- (Philippines) Derrick Pumaren
Assistant(s)
- (Philippines) Gee Abanilla
- (Philippines) Agustin Tiongco

Legend
- (DP) Unsigned draft pick
- (FA) Free agent
- (S) Suspended
- Injured

== Broadcast notes ==
Game	Play-by-play	Analyst	Courtside Reporters	Pre-Game and Halftime Hosts
Game 1	Noli Eala	Quinito Henson	Benjie Santiago	Anthony Suntay and Chiqui Roa-Puno
Game 2	Ed Picson	Tommy Manotoc	Dong Alejar and Benjie Santiago	Anthony Suntay and Jannelle So
Game 3	Noli Eala	Yeng Guiao	Mon Liboro and Benjie Santiago	Paolo Trillo and Chiqui Roa-Puno
Game 4				
Game 5	Ed Picson	TJ Manotoc	Dong Alejar and Mon Liboro	Paolo Trillo and Chiqui Roa-Puno
