= 1999 PBA Commissioner's Cup finals =

Team	Coach	Wins
San Miguel Beermen	Jong Uichico	4
Formula Shell Zoom Masters	Perry Ronquillo	2
- Dates: September 3–15, 1999
- Television: VTV (IBC)
- Radio network: DZRV

PBA Commissioner's Cup finals chronology
- < 1998 2000 >

PBA finals chronology
- < 1999 All-Filipino 1999 Governors' >

The 1999 PBA Commissioner's Cup finals was the best-of-7 basketball championship series of the 1999 PBA Commissioner's Cup, and the conclusion of the conference playoffs. The Formula Shell Zoom Masters and San Miguel Beermen played for the 73rd championship contested by the league.

The San Miguel Beermen halted Formula Shell Zoom Masters' two straight title-winning runs and won their first championship in five years, under coach Jong Uichico, ushering a new era in their franchise history.

Danny Seigle won his first rookie finals MVP in Commissioner's Cup finals.

== Qualification ==
Shell		San Miguel
Finished 5–3 (.625), tied for 2nd	Eliminations	Finished 5–3 (.625), tied for 2nd
defeated 7th seed Purefoods	Quarterfinals	defeated 5th seed Tanduay
defeated Sta. Lucia, 3-2	Best-of-5 semifinals	defeated Alaska, 3-2

== Series scoring summary ==
Team	Game 1	Game 2	Game 3	Game 4	Game 5	Game 6	Wins
San Miguel Beer	68	78	87	72	89	74	4
Formula Shell	64	68	89	77	85	64	2

== Games summary ==
=== Game 1 ===
VTV

September 3

San Miguel Beermen 68, Formula Shell Zoom Masters 64
Scoring by quarter: 16-10, 20-18, 15-17, 17-19
Pts: Terquin Mott 20	Pts: John Best 29
San Miguel leads series, 1-0

Philsports Arena, Pasig

=== Game 2 ===
VTV

September 5

San Miguel Beermen 78, Formula Shell Zoom Masters 68
San Miguel leads series, 2-0

Philsports Arena, Pasig

=== Game 3 ===
VTV

September 8

San Miguel Beermen 87, Formula Shell Zoom Masters 89 (OT)
San Miguel leads series, 2-1

Philsports Arena, Pasig

Shell squandered a 15-point lead early in the third quarter but got big baskets from Benjie Paras and import John Best in the extension period. Paras and Best each scored 27 points, Best knocked in five points in overtime, including two crucial charities off Danny Seigle's offensive foul with 12.6 seconds left, Best' two free throws gave Shell an 88-84 lead.

=== Game 4 ===
VTV

September 10

San Miguel Beermen 72, Formula Shell Zoom Masters 77
Pts: Terquin Mott 29	Pts: Victor Pablo 23
Series tied, 2-2

Philsports Arena, Pasig

Victor Pablo and Noy Castillo rose to the challenge with Pablo scoring 23 points, seven of them in the final 12 minutes, and Castillo's three-point shot down the stretch gave Shell their biggest lead at 68-55.

=== Game 5 ===
VTV

September 12

San Miguel Beermen 89, Formula Shell Zoom Masters 85
Scoring by quarter: 13-24, 21-18, 23-17, 32-26
San Miguel leads series, 3-2

Philsports Arena, Pasig

=== Game 6 ===
VTV

September 15

San Miguel Beermen 74, Formula Shell Zoom Masters 64
San Miguel wins series, 4–2

Philsports Arena, Pasig

The beermen ripped the game wide open in the second quarter when they held the Zoom Masters to only three field goals and a charity while pouring in the shots for a 33-21 halftime advantage, San Miguel entered the fourth period with a 55-44 lead, But John Best, Victor Pablo and Noy Castillo combined to pull Shell within 59-63 with 5:35 remaining, the beermen came through with a 7-2 run with Freddie Abuda making a key putback and Terquin Mott hitting a baseline turnaround shot and a thunderous dunk over Benjie Paras. Danny Seigle won on his first rookie finals MVP and San Miguel captures on his first championship 12th title

1999 PBA Commissioners Cup Champions

San Miguel Beermen
12th title

== Rosters ==
San Miguel Beermen roster
Players

Pos.	#	POB	Name	Height	Weight	DOB (YYYY–MM–DD)	From
G	1	(Philippines)	Boybits Victoria	5 ft 11 in (1.80 m)			San Beda
F	3	(United States)	Nic Belasco	6 ft 6 in (1.98 m)			Notre Dame (OH)
C	5	(Philippines)	Ronilo Padilla	6 ft 6 in (1.98 m)			Cebu
G	7	(Philippines)	Michael Mustre	6 ft 0 in (1.83 m)			Letran
C	10	(Philippines)	Danny Ildefonso	6 ft 6 in (1.98 m)			National-U
G/F	15	(Philippines)	Dwight Lago	6 ft 2 in (1.88 m)			De La Salle
G	17	(Philippines)	Olsen Racela	5 ft 10 in (1.78 m)			Ateneo
G	18	(Philippines)	Art Dela Cruz	6 ft 3 in (1.91 m)			San Sebastian
C	24	(Philippines)	Cris Bolado	6 ft 7 in (2.01 m)			National-U
F	25	(Philippines)	Freddie Abuda	6 ft 4 in (1.93 m)			Cebu
G	32	(United States)	Rob Duat	6 ft 3 in (1.91 m)			Menlo
F	42	(United States)	Danny Seigle	6 ft 6 in (1.98 m)			Wagner
F	40	(United States)	Terquin Mott (I)	6 ft 8 in (2.03 m)			Coppin State

Coaches
Head coach
- (Philippines) Jong Uichico
Assistant(s)
- (Philippines) Jojo Villa

Legend
- (DP) Unsigned draft pick
- (FA) Free agent
- (S) Suspended
- (I) Import
- Injured

Formula Shell Zoom Masters roster
Players

Pos.	#	POB	Name	Height	Weight	DOB (YYYY–MM–DD)	From
G	1	(United States)	Dennis Harrison	6 ft 2 in (1.88 m)			Hawaiʻi
F	3	(United States)	Chris Jackson	6 ft 4 in (1.93 m)			San Bernardino Valley
G	4	(United States)	Noy Castillo	6 ft 0 in (1.83 m)			The Citadel
G	6	(Philippines)	Arnold Rodriguez	6 ft 1 in (1.85 m)			PUP
F	9	(Philippines)	Jay Mendoza	6 ft 4 in (1.93 m)			Mapúa
C	11	(Philippines)	Erwin Luna	6 ft 7 in (2.01 m)			Adamson
G	12	(Philippines)	Porferio Marzan	6 ft 2 in (1.88 m)			Baguio
C	14	(Philippines)	Benjie Paras	6 ft 5 in (1.96 m)			Philippines
F	19	(Philippines)	Joel Dualan	6 ft 3 in (1.91 m)			Manila
G/F	25	(United States)	John Best (I)	6 ft 5 in (1.96 m)			Tennessee Tech
G	30	(Philippines)	Gerry Esplana	5 ft 11 in (1.80 m)			Far Eastern
G	31	(United States)	Rommel Santos	5 ft 11 in (1.80 m)			Staten Island
F	33	(Philippines)	Victor Pablo	6 ft 4 in (1.93 m)			Far Eastern

Coaches
Head coach
- (Philippines) Perry Ronquillo
Assistant(s)
- (Philippines) Joey Guanio

Legend
- (DP) Unsigned draft pick
- (FA) Free agent
- (S) Suspended
- (I) Import
- Injured

== Broadcast notes ==
Game	Play-by-play	Analyst	Courtside Reporters
Game 1			
Game 2			
Game 3	Noli Eala	Yeng Guiao	
Game 4			
Game 5	Ed Picson	Andy Jao	
Game 6	Noli Eala	Yeng Guiao	Anthony Suntay, Jannelle So and Mon Liboro
