= 2002 PBA Governors' Cup finals =

Basketball tournament

2002 PBA Governors Cup finals
Team	Coach	Wins
Purefoods TJ Hotdogs	Ryan Gregorio	4
Alaska Aces	Tim Cone	3
- Dates: May 12–26, 2002
- MVP: Kerby Raymundo
- Television: Viva TV (IBC)
- Radio network: DZSR

PBA Governors Cup finals chronology
- < 2001 2011 >

PBA finals chronology
- < 2001 Governors 2002 Commissioner's >

The 2002 Samsung-PBA Governors Cup finals was the best-of-7 basketball championship series of the 2002 PBA Governors Cup and the conclusion of the conference's playoffs. The Purefoods Tender Juicy Hotdogs and Alaska Aces played for the 81st championship contested by the league.

The Purefoods Tender Juicy Hotdogs captured their 1st title in five years and sixth overall crown, coming back from a 0–2 overhaul and defeated the Alaska Aces in a seven-game series, it was also the first championship of the Purefoods franchise under a new ownership San Miguel Corporation, the finals victory made rookie coach Ryan Gregorio the youngest mentor to lead his team to a PBA title.

== Series scoring summary ==
Team	Game 1	Game 2	Game 3	Game 4	Game 5	Game 6	Game 7	Wins
Purefoods	73	102	80	82	84	78	91	4
Alaska	79	106	66	76	72	85	76	3

== Games summary ==
=== Game 1 ===
Viva TV

May 12

recap

Purefoods Tender Juicy Hotdogs 73, Alaska Aces 79
Scoring by quarter: 21–16, 14–27, 18–16, 20–20
Pts: Derrick Brown 35	Pts: James Head 23
Alaska leads series, 1–0

Araneta Coliseum, Quezon City

The aces forced the hotdogs into costly turnovers as Derrick Brown flubbed an attempt at point-blank while Rey Evangelista and Kerby Raymundo missed their shots down the stretch. The hotdogs were trying to come back from a 71–74 deficit in the last 46 seconds but Ron Riley and Bryan Gahol alternated in handcuffing Brown as the aces pulled away.

=== Game 2 ===
Viva TV

May 14

recap

Purefoods Tender Juicy Hotdogs 102, Alaska Aces 106 (2OT)
Scoring by quarter: 21–22, 19–21, 22–28, 22–13, Overtime: 9–9
Pts: Derrick Brown 45	Pts: Ron Riley 43
Alaska leads series, 2–0

Araneta Coliseum, Quezon City

Ron Riley hit three of his team's five triples in the third quarter as the aces slowly broke loose at 71–62 entering the fourth period. The game went into two overtimes, John Arigo missed a game-clinching running jumper with three seconds left in regulation, forcing the first extension, Bryan Gahol flubbed a free throw from a potential three-point play with 8.9 seconds remaining and threw away a finger roll, forcing the second overtime.

=== Game 3 ===
Viva TV

May 16

recap

Purefoods Tender Juicy Hotdogs 80, Alaska Aces 66
Scoring by quarter: 29–18, 23–14, 16–19, 12–15
Pts: Derrick Brown 21	Pts: James Head 21
Alaska leads series, 2–1

Araneta Coliseum, Quezon City

=== Game 4 ===
Viva TV

May 19

recap

Purefoods Tender Juicy Hotdogs 82, Alaska Aces 76
Scoring by quarter: 20–14, 20–27, 23–14, 19–21
Pts: Derrick Brown 46	Pts: James Head 23
Series tied, 2–2

Araneta Coliseum, Quezon City

=== Game 5 ===
Viva TV

May 21

Purefoods Tender Juicy Hotdogs 84, Alaska Aces 72
Scoring by quarter: 17–20, 25–11, 22–16, 20–25
Pts: Derrick Brown 25	Pts: John Arigo 22
Purefoods leads series, 3–2

Araneta Coliseum, Quezon City

The hotdogs built a 42–31 spread at halftime and padded the lead at 64–44, a few minutes left in the third quarter. Alaska coach Tim Cone was assessed a second technical foul and was ejected during the opening minutes of the final period, Ron Riley and John Arigo tried to rally the aces to trimmed the gap, 62–75, but Derrick Brown proved to be unstoppable as he led the attack for the hotdogs.

=== Game 6 ===
Viva TV

May 23

Purefoods Tender Juicy Hotdogs 78, Alaska Aces 85
Scoring by quarter: 16–18, 17–24, 12–19, 33–24
Pts: Derrick Brown 27	Pts: James Head 23
Series tied, 3–3

Araneta Coliseum, Quezon City

The aces smothered the hotdogs in the third quarter and went to Rodney Santos, James Head and Ron Riley on the offensive end, a triple by Santos midway in the third period set the stage for a rout as Alaska took a comfortable 61–45 lead going into the last 10 minutes, the hotdogs suddenly crumbled without Kelvin Price on the floor. Purefoods coach Ryan Gregorio opted to save Price for last and left Derrick Brown to contend with Head and Riley.

=== Game 7 ===
Viva TV

May 26

Purefoods Tender Juicy Hotdogs 91, Alaska Aces 76
Scoring by quarter: 24–10, 20–20, 21–24, 26–22
Pts: Derrick Brown 21	Pts: James Head 29
Purefoods wins series, 4–3

Araneta Coliseum, Quezon City

The hotdogs sizzled hot and started strong, taking a 24–10 advantage at the end of the first quarter. The aces mounted a 16–4 run in the third quarter to come close but the hotdogs simply quelled the uprising, old reliables Ronnie Magsanoc and Alvin Patrimonio had their shining moments, a Magsanoc' triple and Derrick Brown's seven straight markers in the fourth halted Alaska's last-ditch stand.

2002 PBA Governors Cup Champions

Purefoods Tender Juicy Hotdogs
Sixth title

== Rosters ==
Purefoods Tender Juicy Hotdogs roster
Players

Pos.	#	POB	Name	Height	Weight	DOB (YYYY–MM–DD)	From
F	2	(Philippines)	Richard Yee	6 ft 4 in (1.93 m)			UST
C	3	(Philippines)	Bonel Balingit	6 ft 9 in (2.06 m)			Visayas
G	5	(Philippines)	Ronnie Magsanoc	5 ft 9 in (1.75 m)			Philippines
F	7	(Philippines)	Rey Evangelista	6 ft 3 in (1.91 m)			UST
F	10	(Philippines)	Marc Victoria	6 ft 3 in (1.91 m)			Far Eastern
G	13	(Philippines)	Roger Yap	6 ft 1 in (1.85 m)			USJ–R
G	14	(Philippines)	Junel Mendiola	6 ft 1 in (1.85 m)			PSBA
F	16	(Philippines)	Alvin Patrimonio	6 ft 3 in (1.91 m)			Mapúa
F	18	(Philippines)	Paul Guerrero	6 ft 4 in (1.93 m)			Letran
C	21	(Philippines)	Kerby Raymundo	6 ft 6 in (1.98 m)			Letran
G	32	(United States)	Derrick Brown (I)	6 ft 3 in (1.91 m)			Providence
C	33	(Philippines)	Chris Cantonjos	6 ft 6 in (1.98 m)			UST
F	34	(Philippines)	Jolly Escobar	6 ft 5 in (1.96 m)			UE
F		(United States)	Kelvin Price (I)	6 ft 8 in (2.03 m)			Charlotte

Coaches
Head coach
- (Philippines) Ryan Gregorio
Assistant(s)
- (Philippines) Ramon Jose

Legend
- (DP) Unsigned draft pick
- (FA) Free agent
- (S) Suspended
- (I) Import
- Injured

Alaska Aces roster
Players

Pos.	#	POB	Name	Height	Weight	DOB (YYYY–MM–DD)	From
G	1	(United States)	Philip Newton	6 ft 2 in (1.88 m)
G	6	(Philippines)	Jojo Lastimosa	6 ft 0 in (1.83 m)			USJ–R
C	8	(Philippines)	Don Allado	6 ft 6 in (1.98 m)			De La Salle
G	9	(Philippines)	Rodney Santos	6 ft 1 in (1.85 m)			San Sebastian
F	10	(Philippines)	Eric Reyes	6 ft 3 in (1.91 m)			Ateneo
G	11	(Philippines)	Richie Ticzon	5 ft 8 in (1.73 m)			Ateneo
F	21	(Philippines)	Bryan Gahol	6 ft 4 in (1.93 m)			Philippines
C	22	(United States)	James Walkvist	6 ft 10 in (2.08 m)
F	31	(United States)	John Arigo	6 ft 4 in (1.93 m)			Tampa
F	32	(United States)	Ron Riley (I)	6 ft 5 in (1.96 m)			Arizona State
F		(United States)	James Head (I)	6 ft 7 in (2.01 m)			Eastern Michigan
F	41	(United States)	Miguel Noble	6 ft 5 in (1.96 m)			Utica

Coaches
Head coach
- (United States) Tim Cone
Assistant(s)
- (Philippines) Richard Bachmann
- (Philippines) Gilbert Reyes
- (Philippines) Luigi Trillo

Legend
- (DP) Unsigned draft pick
- (FA) Free agent
- (S) Suspended
- (I) Import
- Injured

== Broadcast notes ==
Game	Play-by-play	Analyst	Courtside Reporters
Game 1	Noli Eala	Tommy Manotoc	
Game 2	Ed Picson	Quinito Henson	
Game 3			
Game 4			
Game 5	Ed Picson	TJ Manotoc	
Game 6	Noli Eala	Quinito Henson	
Game 7	Ed Picson	Quinito Henson	TJ Manotoc and Chiqui Roa-Puno
