= Bobong Velez =

Former TV executive

- Born: Carlos Velez; November 4, 1945; Philippines
- Died: July 3, 2017 (aged 71); Dumaguete, Negros Oriental
- Other name: Bobong Velez
- Education: De La Salle University
- Occupations: Businessman, TV producer
- Years active: 1978–2003
- Known for: Chairman and CEO of Vintage Television
- Relatives: Ricky Velez

Carlos "Bobong" Velez (November 4, 1945 – July 3, 2017) was a Filipino TV producer who owned the Vintage Television, the network broadcast the PBA in the 1990s, and the Blow-by-Blow that discovered Manny Pacquiao.

== Career ==
A graduate of De La Salle University, together with his brother Ricky, Bobong Velez established Vintage Television (VTV) in 1978, and started broadcasting Philippine Basketball Association (PBA) games from 1982 until 1999. When he started in bidding in 1982, his VTV paid Php 5.2 million, and Joe Cantada as one of its main play-by-play.

In the 1990s, Velez assembled coverage with the likes of future PBA commissioner Noli Eala, Chino Trinidad, Sev Sarmenta as play-by-play, while columnist Quinito Henson, Andy Jao, and other guests panelist (like coaches) serves as color commentators. Also in this decade, Velez ventured to boxing and the Blow-by-Blow, with Trinidad, Eala, Henson, Romy Kinantar, and Ronnie Nathanielsz as panelists. The boxing venture gave way to the popularity of then-amateur boxing star Manny Pacquiao.

== Personal life and death ==
Velez died in Dumaguete on July 3, 2017.
