= Bobong =

Bobong may refer to:

- a town in Taliabu Island, North Maluku, Indonesia
- Bob Ong, pseudonym of a contemporary Filipino author
- Bobong Velez (1945–2017), Filipino TV producer
