= Blow by Blow (Philippine TV program) =

- Also known as: Manny Pacquiao Presents: Blow By Blow (2015–2016; 2022–2025)
- Genre: Sports; Boxing
- Directed by: Abet Ramos
- Presented by: Various
- Starring: Various
- Theme music composer: Dennis Milner
- Opening theme: "Against All Odds" (instrumental)
- Ending theme: "Against All Odds" (instrumental)
- Country of origin: Philippines
- Original languages: Filipino; English

Production
- Producer: Carlos "Bobong" Velez (1994–1999)
- Camera setup: Multi-camera
- Running time: 60 minutes
- Production companies: Vintage Enterprises (1994–1999); MP Promotions (2015–2016; 2022–present)

Original release
- Network: PTV
- Release: October 30, 1994 – February 11, 1996
- Network: IBC
- Release: February 18, 1996 – December 12, 1999
- Network: TV5
- Release: December 13, 2015 – 2016
- Network: One Sports
- Release: January 8, 2023 – February 2, 2025

Blow by Blow, presently under the title Manny Pacquiao Presents: Blow By Blow, is a Philippine television sports reality competition show broadcast by PTV, IBC, TV5 and One Sports. It aired on PTV from October 30, 1994, to February 11, 1996. The show moved to IBC on February 18, 1996, until December 12, 1999.

It returned to the air on TV5 from December 13, 2015, to 2016 and One Sports from January 8, 2023, to February 2, 2025.

== History ==
Official title from 1994 to 1999.

The show is usually taped on small venues and gyms across Metro Manila (usually from Parañaque or Mandaluyong).

The show is noted for airing the early bouts of Manny Pacquiao, who quickly became one of its featured boxers.

=== Revival ===
The show was revived on December 13, 2015, and aired every Sunday afternoon on TV5. Pacquiao, one of the homegrown boxers featured in Blow by Blow, together with Sports5, former North Cotabato vice governor and acclaimed boxing analyst Manny Piñol, and boxing promoters Gerry Garcia and Lito Mondejar spearheaded the return of the program that will feature boxing fights of amateur boxers in the country.

In November 2022, Pacquiao, through his MP Promotions, revived the show this time on One Sports channel.

=== Thrilla in Manila 2 ===
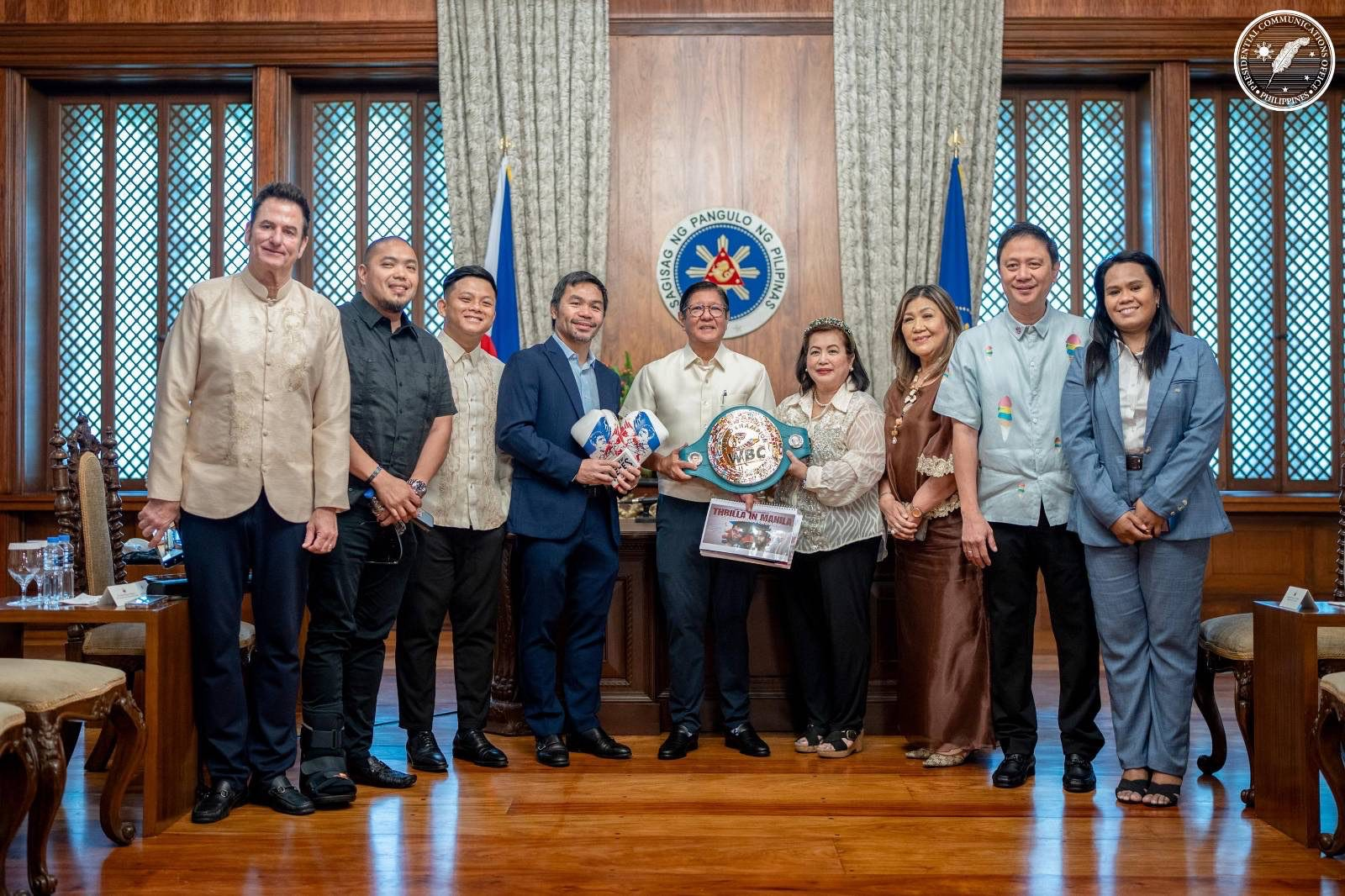
CEO of "Blow by Blow" Marife Barrera together with President Bongbong Marcos, Sean Gibbons and Manny Pacquiao in a courtesy call in Malacañan Palace on August 8, 2025.

WBC Mini-flyweight champion Jerusalem is scheduled to fight South African boxer Siyakholwa Kuse on October 29, 2025, in a Blow by Blow & MP Promotions event billed "Thrilla in Manila 2". It is meant as the 50th anniversary commemoration of the original Thrilla in Manila 1975 fight between Muhammad Ali and Joe Frazier.

== Notable incidents ==
=== Eugene Barutag incident ===
On December 9, 1995, a young fighter from General Santos City named Eugene Barutag, was scheduled for an eight-round match against veteran Randy Andagan of Biñan, Laguna. Barutag was winning the match in the first four rounds and almost knocked out Andagan, but the latter got his second wind and beat the younger boxer, who at the end of the bout, collapsed in his corner. At that time, there were no standby paramedics in case of emergency. Using the service vehicle of Vintage Sports, Barutag was rushed to the Jose Reyes Memorial Hospital and was declared dead on arrival.

The bout was shown on an i-Witness episode entitled Kamao (fist). The episode won a Peabody Award, together with two other documentaries that the program produced.

The fight also features in the 2015 movie, Kid Kulafu, where Manny Pacquiao witnesses his death.

== Presenters ==
- Bobby Mondejar (ring announcer)
- Mark Anthony Lontayao (ring announcer)
- Ed Picson
- Quinito Henson
- Ronnie Nathanielsz
- Chino Trinidad
- Romy Kintanar

== See also ==
- Vintage Television
- Manny Pacquiao
- Boxing career of Manny Pacquiao
- List of programs broadcast by People's Television Network
- List of TV5 (Philippine TV network) original programming
- List of programs broadcast by One Sports
