= 2000 PBA Commissioner's Cup finals =

Team	Coach	Wins
San Miguel Beermen	Jong Uichico	4
Sta. Lucia Realtors	Norman Black	1
- Dates: September 3–15, 2000
- Television: Viva TV (IBC)
- Radio network: DZRV

PBA Commissioner's Cup finals chronology
- < 1999 2001 >

PBA finals chronology
- < 2000 All-Filipino 2000 Governors >

The 2000 PBA Commissioner's Cup finals was the best-of-7 championship series of the 2000 PBA Commissioner's Cup and the conclusion of the conference's playoffs. The San Miguel Beermen and Sta. Lucia Realtors played for the 76th championship contested by the league.

San Miguel Beermen claim their 14th PBA crown, surpassing the age-old record of the famed Crispa Redmanizers' 13 titles by winning against Sta. Lucia in five games. The Realtors were on their first finals appearance since joining the league in 1993.

Danny Ildefonso won on his second back-to-back Finals MVP in Commissioners Cup finals.

== Series scoring summary ==
Team	Game 1	Game 2	Game 3	Game 4	Game 5	Wins
San Miguel	106	72	89	66	79	4
Sta. Lucia	78	67	85	78	77	1

== Games summary ==
=== Game 1 ===
Viva TV

September 3

San Miguel Beermen 106, Sta. Lucia Realtors 78

Araneta Coliseum, Quezon City

The Beermen limited Sta. Lucia import Ansu Sesay to just three points in the second period to build a 44-33 halftime advantage. In the third quarter, San Miguel continued the assault to post a 75-50 lead.

=== Game 2 ===
Viva TV

September 6

San Miguel Beermen 72, Sta. Lucia Realtors 67

Urdaneta Sports Complex, Pangasinan

Danny Ildefonso muscled his way to 18 points and 10 rebounds, and outplayed Marlou Aquino at the paint before Danny Seigle converted on a trey that gave the Beermen a 67-61 spread.

=== Game 3 ===
Viva TV

September 10

San Miguel Beermen 89, Sta. Lucia Realtors 85
Scoring by quarter: 25-20, 14-17, 23-25, 27-23
Pts: Stephen Howard 24 Danny Seigle 23	Pts: Dennis Espino 27

Araneta Coliseum, Quezon City

Danny Seigle scored six of the Beermen's last nine points, hitting two clutch baskets to lift San Miguel past Sta. Lucia, with Stephen Howard trapped on a double team down low. The Beermen were forced to rotate the ball, which eventually ended in Seigle's hands. Seigle drilled a triple that gave the Beermen an 83-82 edge with 1:46 left. A minute later, Seigle drove through the Realtors' defense for an 87-83 lead with 21.2 seconds remaining.

=== Game 4 ===
Viva TV

September 13

San Miguel Beermen 66, Sta. Lucia Realtors 78
Pts: Stephen Howard 21	Pts: Dennis Espino 16

Philsports Arena, Pasig

Dennis Espino and Paolo Mendoza took charge in the final quarter, with import Ansu Sesay unable to elude the Beermen's sticky defense. The Realtors limited the Beermen to just eight points in the fourth period.

=== Game 5 ===
Viva TV

September 15

San Miguel Beermen 79, Sta. Lucia Realtors 77
Scoring by quarter: 22-14, 19-18, 22-26, 16-19
Pts: Danny Ildefonso 23	Pts: Marlou Aquino 26
San Miguel wins series, 4–1

Araneta Coliseum, Quezon City

Danny Ildefonso and Danny Seigle delivered the killing blows on the Realtors, scoring a lay-in and a three-pointer in the closing seconds in a nail-biting victory. Rookie Paolo Mendoza of Sta. Lucia, who kept his team within striking distance in the third period with his fiery outside shooting, pegged the final score with a triple. Danny Ildefonso won his second back to back Finals MVP and San Miguel captured back to back championships for their 14th title.

2000 PBA Commissioner's Cup Champions

San Miguel Beermen
14th title

== Roster ==
San Miguel Beermen roster
Players

Pos.	#	POB	Name	Height	Weight	DOB (YYYY–MM–DD)	From
G	1	(Philippines)	Emmanuel Victoria	5 ft 10 in (1.78 m)			San Beda
C	3	(United States)	Nic Belasco	6 ft 6 in (1.98 m)			Notre Dame (OH)
C	5	(Philippines)	Ronilo Padilla	6 ft 5 in (1.96 m)			Cebu
F	7	(Philippines)	Michael Mustre	6 ft 1 in (1.85 m)			Letran
F/C	10	(Philippines)	Danny Ildefonso	6 ft 6 in (1.98 m)			National-U
F	15	(Philippines)	Dwight Lago	6 ft 3 in (1.91 m)			De La Salle
G	17	(Philippines)	Olsen Racela	5 ft 10 in (1.78 m)			Ateneo
F	18	(Philippines)	Arturo Dela Cruz	6 ft 3 in (1.91 m)			San Sebastian
F	21	(United States)	Stephen Howard (I)	6 ft 8 in (2.03 m)			DePaul
F	25	(Philippines)	Freddie Abuda	6 ft 4 in (1.93 m)			Cebu
F	32	(United States)	Robert Duat	6 ft 4 in (1.93 m)			Menlo
F	42	(United States)	Danny Seigle	6 ft 6 in (1.98 m)			Wagner
F/C	44	(Philippines)	June Carmona	6 ft 6 in (1.98 m)			UPHSD

Coaches
Head coach
- (Philippines) Jong Uichico
Assistant(s)
- (Philippines) Siot Tanquingcen

Legend
- (DP) Unsigned draft pick
- (FA) Free agent
- (S) Suspended
- (I) Import
- Injured

Sta. Lucia Realtors roster
Players

Pos.	#	POB	Name	Height	Weight	DOB (YYYY–MM–DD)	From
G	1	(Philippines)	Chris Tan	6 ft 1 in (1.85 m)			De La Salle
F	2	(United States)	Ansu Sesay (I)	6 ft 7 in (2.01 m)			Mississippi
G	4	(Philippines)	Gerardo Santiago	5 ft 10 in (1.78 m)			Mapúa
G	5	(Philippines)	Ronnie Magsanoc	5 ft 9 in (1.75 m)			Philippines
C	7	(Philippines)	Richard del Rosario	6 ft 5 in (1.96 m)			De La Salle
G	8	(Philippines)	Paolo Mendoza	5 ft 11 in (1.80 m)			Philippines
G/F	11	(Philippines)	Gerard Francisco	6 ft 3 in (1.91 m)			UST
C	13	(Philippines)	Marlou Aquino	6 ft 9 in (2.06 m)			Adamson
F	15	(Philippines)	Expedito Falcasantos	6 ft 4 in (1.93 m)			Cebu
F/C	16	(Philippines)	Dennis Espino	6 ft 6 in (1.98 m)			UST
F	17	(Philippines)	Michael Orquillas	6 ft 2 in (1.88 m)			Cebu
F	18	(Philippines)	Benny Cheng	6 ft 3 in (1.91 m)			Mapúa
G	33	(United States)	Rob Wainwright	6 ft 5 in (1.96 m)			Solano CC
C	38	(Philippines)	Angelo David	6 ft 6 in (1.98 m)			Far Eastern

Coaches
Head coach
- (United States) Norman Black
Assistant(s)
- (Philippines) Franz Pumaren
- (Philippines) Adonis Tierra

Legend
- (DP) Unsigned draft pick
- (FA) Free agent
- (S) Suspended
- (I) Import
- Injured

== Broadcast notes ==
Game	Play-by-play	Analyst	Courtside reporters	Pre-game hosts
Game 1				
Game 2	Mon Liboro	Quinito Henson		
Game 3				
Game 4				
Game 5	Noli Eala	Quinito Henson		
