= PBA on Vintage Sports =

Branding used for presentation of PBA games produced by Vintage Sports

- Also known as: PBA on VTV (1996–99)
- Genre: PBA game telecasts
- Directed by: Ramon Ramano (1982–1994); Jun Vigayan (1982–1993); Abet Ramos (1991–1999); Jun delos Santos (1992–1997); Al Neri (1995–1997); Lee Japa (1995–1999); Dong Catimpuyan (1998–1999)
- Presented by: various PBA on Vintage Sports commentators
- Country of origin: Philippines
- Original languages: English (1982–1995); Filipino (1996–1999)

Production
- Executive producer: Carlos "Bobong" Velez
- Camera setup: Multiple-camera setup
- Running time: 150 minutes or until game ends
- Production companies: Philippine Basketball Association; Vintage Sports

Original release
- Network: City2 Television (1982–83); PTV (1984–95); IBC (1996–99)
- Release: March 7, 1982 – December 12, 1999

Related
- PBA on MBS; PBA on Viva TV; PBA on NBN/IBC; PBA on ABC/TV5; PBA on One Sports

PBA on Vintage Sports is a Philippine television sports presentation show broadcast by City2, PTV and IBC. It aired from March 7, 1982 to December 12, 1999. The consist of branding used for presentation of Philippine Basketball Association games produced by Vintage Sports.

== History ==
Vintage Sports' scoring bug circa-1992 season.

In 1982, the PBA awarded the broadcast rights of its games to Vintage Enterprises, Inc., a company owned by Carlos "Bobong" Velez and signed a P5.4 million deal with the league.

Games were aired on City2 Television, with the second game of a doubleheader aired live and the first game followed afterwards on a delayed basis. One play-by-play and one analyst was assigned to cover both games.

For the first three years of Vintage's coverage, they had the legendary sports commentator Joe Cantada and Pinggoy Pengson as its main anchors with Steve Kattan and Andy Jao as the analysts. Future PBA commissioner Jun Bernardino served as the sideline reporter (dubbed as the "Man on the Ball"). Occasional analysts were also added in the panel, which includes Freddie Webb, Norman Black and Joaqui Trillo.

Several innovations were added by Vintage to the PBA coverage compared to their predecessor, including the "Man on the Ball" feature, which acts as a sideline reporter, "Inside Basketball", which discusses the basketball fundamentals (hosted by Steve Kattan, then later Norman Black), and "Winner's Profile", a feature segment about the players during their off-the-court activities. They also changed the delivery of the panelists by bringing out insights from the action in the game with less emphasis on play-by-play.

The orientation of the main camera was changed since the 1983 Open Conference, with the team benches moved at the bottom of the screen. This is to accommodate additional advertisement when the main camera pans at the basketball court. Team huddles during timeouts were also included since 1984.

In 1984, Vintage transferred its broadcast to Maharlika Broadcasting System as their new official partner for next 11 years

After the PBA's transfer to The ULTRA in 1985, Ronnie Nathanielsz, Sev Sarmenta and Ed Picson were later added as additional play-by-play commentators. In 1986, MBS was sequestered by the revolutionary government of Corazon Aquino after the EDSA People Power Revolution and MBS was renamed as the People's Television Network.

In 1987, Vintage started airing PBA doubleheaders live, and they assign a different play-by-play commentator for both games, although the analyst will still cover both games. Beginning in 1988, Romy Kintanar did the halftime features, entitled "Kaypee at the Half".

Starting the 1989 All-Filipino Conference, Vintage used a character generator score bug, which replaced the "keyed" score bug used since 1982. A dedicated camera was also designated for the game clock so it can be superimposed with the score bug. This was done on a sporadic basis in 1984 and 1986. A CG game clock was used for the 1987 season.

After Cantada's death in March 1992, Ed Picson, Sev Sarmenta and Bill Velasco became the main anchors with Quinito Henson, Andy Jao and Butch Maniego as color commentators. Later additions were Jimmy Javier and Noli Eala (who served as an analyst first then becoming a play-by-play commentator in 1995). Starting in 1993, a different game analyst was assigned for doubleheaders.

In 1996, Vintage transferred to Intercontinental Broadcasting Corporation (IBC) as part of the launching of Vintage Television, a prime time slot that aired on IBC. They also changed the main language in delivering the games, from an all-English format to taglish (mixed Filipino and English). Radio commentators such as Chino Trinidad, Rado Dimalibot, and Randy Sacdalan were elevated to TV broadcast.

Over the next three seasons, Vintage paid the league a total of over two billion pesos (135 million in 1997, 1.885 billion in 1998 and over 300 million in 1999).

From 1997 to 1998, the games are also aired at ESPN Asia. A different panel were assigned for the ESPN broadcast, which usually headed by Ronnie Nathanielsz.

By 1998, Sarmenta, Velasco and Maniego left for ABS-CBN Sports to be the main presenters for the network's newly established league, the Metropolitan Basketball Association (MBA). Trinidad and Yeng Guiao would also become one of the most popular tandems in Vintage Sports. Eala and Picson would often be tandem with Henson and Jao. Radio commentators Benjie Santiago and Mon Liboro was also elevated to the TV coverage.

In 1999, Anthony Suntay and Chiqui Roa-Puno, or at times Paolo Trillo, Jannelle So and Dong Alejar became the pregame and halftime hosts for the coverage. Also, the games were aired on Eagle Broadcasting Corporation's Net 25 on a slightly delayed basis.

== End of PBA on Vintage Sports ==
On December 12, 1999, Vintage Sports aired its last PBA game during Game 6 of the 1999 Governors' Cup finals between the Alaska Milkmen and the San Miguel Beermen were played at the Araneta Coliseum and before merging with Viva TV in 2000. Ed Picson and Andy Jao were the commentators and the sideline reporters were Ronnie Nathanielsz, Jannelle So Chiqui Roa-Puno and Dong Alejar for its last run.

== Viva Entertainment merger ==
In 2000, Vintage Television merged with Viva Television and signed a 770 million pesos deal with 3 years. It defeated the bid of GMA Network, who was hoping to win the bid to compete with television rival ABS-CBN, who had the television rights to cover the rival league Metropolitan Basketball Association.

== Music ==
Vintage Sports used different themes in every season the covered the PBA games. During their first years covering the league, they incorporate pop music when cutting into a commercial break. The list of their main themes are as follows:

- 1989–1992, 1995 - Trilling Prospect by Zach Laurence
- 1993–1994 - Pushing the Limit by G. Kavanagh and Hennie Bekker
- 1996 - Barcelona by John Tesh (also used Shock by John Tesh as secondary theme)
- 1996 Commissioner's Cup–1996 Governors' Cup - Spark by John Tesh
- 1997 All-Filipino Cup - The Higher You Rise by Robbie Buchanan
- 1997 All-Filipino Finals–1998 Commissioner's Cup - Virtual Sports by Mark Wood
- 1998 Centennial Cup–1998 Governors' Cup, 1999 Commissioner's Cup–1999 Governors' Cup - Show Stunts by Elliot Bernstein
- 1998 Centennial Cup–1999 - Sweeps 1 by Elliot Bernstein
- 1999 All-Filipino Cup–1999 Commissioner's Cup - Driveway by Parry Music

== List of broadcasters ==
- Joe Cantada (lead play-by-play, 1982–91)
- Pinggoy Pengson (lead play-by-play, 1982–88)
- Noli Eala (game analyst, 1992–94; lead play-by-play, 1995–99)
- Jimmy Javier (play-by-play, 1992-93)
- Mon Liboro (play-by-play, 1997–99)
- Ronnie Nathanielsz (play-by-play, 1984–85; sideline reporter, 1992-99)
- Ed Picson (lead play-by-play, 1987–99)
- Randy Sacdalan (play-by-play, 1995–99)
- Benjie Santiago (play-by-play, 1998–99)
- Sev Sarmenta (lead play-by-play, 1987–96)
- Chino Trinidad (sideline reporter, 1993-95; play-by-play, 1996–99)
- Bill Velasco (sideline reporter, 1990; play-by-play, 1991–92)
- Norman Black (game analyst, 1984-85)
- Tim Cone (game analyst, 1986–88)
- Alfrancis Chua (game analyst, 1999)
- Rado Dimalibot (game analyst, 1995–99)
- Yeng Guiao (game analyst, 1995–99)
- Quinito Henson (game analyst, 1985–89, 1992–99)
- Andy Jao (game analyst, 1982–99)
- Steve Kattan (game analyst, 1982–86)
- Butch Maniego (game analyst, 1989–97; sideline reporter, 1994-97)
- Joaqui Trillo (game analyst, 1984–89)
- Freddie Webb (game analyst, 1984–85)
- Jim Kelly (game analyst, 1993)
- Yell Aguila (sideline reporter, 1997)
- Anna Amigo (sideline reporter, 1993–94)
- Ronith Ang-Cogswell (sideline reporter, 1993–95)
- Anthony Suntay (sideline reporter, 1995-99)
- Dong Alejar (sideline reporter, 1998–99)
- Chiqui Roa-Puno (sideline reporter, 1998–99)
- Jannelle So (sideline reporter, 1998–99)
- Paolo Trillo (sideline reporter, 1998–99)
- Jun Bernardino (sideline reporter, 1982–83)
- Romy Kintanar (sideline reporter, 1985–95)
- Danny Sembrano (sideline reporter, 1983–84)
- Katherine De Leon-Vilar (sideline reporter, 1990–91)
- Mylene Quinto (sideline reporter, 1993)
- Seppie Cristobal (sideline reporter, 1998)
- Ria Tanjuatco-Trillo (sideline reporter, 1998)

== See also ==
- Philippine Basketball Association
- PBA on Viva TV
- PBA on NBN/IBC
- PBA on ABC
- PBA on One Sports
- List of programs broadcast by Banahaw Broadcasting Corporation
- List of programs broadcast by People's Television Network

== Bibliography ==
- PBA, The First 25 (2000, PBA Books) p. 33
- PBA 20 Years at the Pictures (1994, PBA Books) pp. 118–119 [Images]

Preceded by PBA on MBS	PBA TV coverage partners 1982–1999	Succeeded by PBA on Viva TV
