= Antonio Lang =

American basketball player and coach

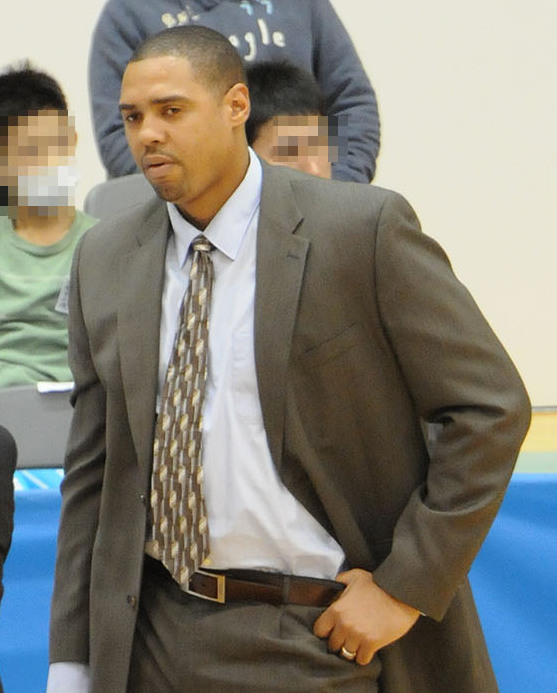
- Lang in 2009

Atlanta Hawks
- Title: Assistant coach
- League: NBA

Personal information
- Born: May 15, 1972 (age 54) Mobile, Alabama, U.S.
- Listed height: 6 ft 8 in (2.03 m)
- Listed weight: 205 lb (93 kg)

Career information
- High school: LeFlore Magnet (Mobile, Alabama)
- College: Duke (1990–1994)
- NBA draft: 1994: 2nd round, 29th overall pick
- Drafted by: Phoenix Suns
- Playing career: 1994–2006
- Position: Small forward / power forward
- Number: 21
- Coaching career: 2006–present

Career history

Playing
- 1994–1995: Phoenix Suns
- 1995–1997: Cleveland Cavaliers
- 1997–1998: Grand Rapids Hoops
- 1998: Miami Heat
- 1999: Cleveland Cavaliers
- 1999–2000: Fort Wayne Fury
- 2000: Toronto Raptors
- 2000: Philadelphia 76ers
- 2000–2001: Fort Wayne Fury
- 2001: Indiana Legends
- 2001: Connecticut Pride
- 2001–2002: Red Bull Thunder
- 2001–2005: Mitsubishi Melco Dolphins
- 2005–2006: Brasília

Coaching
- 2006–2010: Mitsubishi Diamond Dolphins (assistant)
- 2010–2014: Mitsubishi Diamond Dolphins
- 2014–2019: Utah Jazz (assistant)
- 2019–2023: Cleveland Cavaliers (assistant)
- 2023–present: Atlanta Hawks (assistant)

Career highlights
- As Player: 2× PBA champion (2001 Commissioner's, 2002 Commissioner's); PBA Best Import (2001 Commissioner's); All-CBA Second Team (1998); 2× NCAA champion (1991, 1992); Third-team All-ACC (1994); Third-team Parade All-American (1990)
- Stats at NBA.com
- Stats at Basketball Reference
Medals
Men's basketball
Representing United States
FIBA U19 World Championship
| Gold medal – first place | 1991 Edmonton | National team |
Summer Universiade
| Gold medal – first place | 1993 Buffalo | National team |

Antonio Maurice Lang (born May 15, 1972) is an American former professional basketball player who is an assistant coach for the Atlanta Hawks of the National Basketball Association (NBA). He played college basketball for the Duke Blue Devils, winning consecutive NCAA championships in 1991 and 1992.

== High school and college career ==
From Mobile, Alabama, Lang graduated as valedictorian from LeFlore Magnet High School in 1990. The year before, he helped the school win a state championship in basketball. Lang had a productive collegiate basketball career, as he was a member of a Duke team that won two championships in three Final Four appearances.

== Professional career ==
Lang was selected by the Phoenix Suns in the second round (29th overall) in the 1994 NBA draft; however, he saw limited action during his rookie year due to a knee injury. He was traded to the Cleveland Cavaliers in 1995 along with Dan Majerle. Lang also had stints with the Toronto Raptors, Philadelphia 76ers, and Miami Heat. In addition, Lang played in the Continental Basketball Association (with the Fort Wayne Fury and Grand Rapids Hoops), where he was selected to the All-CBA Second Team in 1998. He played in the Philippine Basketball Association, with the Red Bull Thunder.

Lang began playing in 2001 for the Mitsubishi Melco Dolphins (now the Mitsubishi Diamond Dolphins) of the Japan Basketball League. Foot problems, though, prompted Lang to retire from playing basketball in 2006.

== Coaching career ==
Lang became an assistant coach for the Dolphins following his retirement. On May 19, 2010, Lang was named as the Dolphins' head coach.

Lang was hired as an assistant coach for the Utah Jazz in June 2014. He joined the staff of Quin Snyder, who is also a former Duke basketball player. On June 19, 2019, Lang was hired as assistant coach for the Cleveland Cavaliers. On June 14, 2023, Lang was hired by the Atlanta Hawks as an assistant coach.

== Head coaching record in Japan ==
Legend
| Regular season | G | Games coached | W | Games won | L | Games lost | W–L % | Win–loss % |
| Playoffs | PG | Playoff games | PW | Playoff wins | PL | Playoff losses | PW–L % | Playoff win–loss % |

| Team | Year | G | W | L | W–L% | Finish | PG | PW | PL | PW–L% | Result |
|---|---|---|---|---|---|---|---|---|---|---|---|
| Mitsubishi Electric | 2010–11 | 36 | 11 | 25 | .306 | 7th | - | - | - | – | - |
| Mitsubishi Electric | 2011–12 | 42 | 12 | 30 | .286 | 7th | - | - | - | – | - |
| Mitsubishi Electric | 2012–13 | 42 | 12 | 30 | .286 | 7th | - | - | - | – | - |
| Mitsubishi Electric | 2013–14 | 54 | 29 | 25 | .537 | 3rd in Western | 2 | 0 | 2 | .000 | 6th |
