= Ronaldo Puno =

Filipino politician

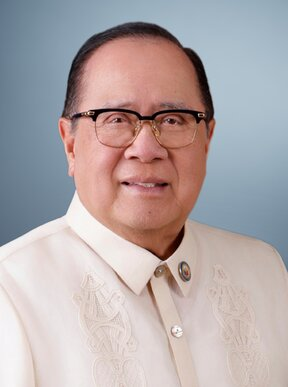
- Official portrait, 2026

Deputy Speaker of the House of Representatives of the Philippines
- Incumbent
- Assumed office July 28, 2025
- House Speaker: Martin Romualdez; Faustino "Bojie" Dy III

Member of the Philippine House of Representatives from Antipolo's 1st congressional district
- Incumbent
- Assumed office June 30, 2025
- Preceded by: Roberto Puno
- In office June 30, 2004 – February 13, 2006
- Preceded by: District established
- Succeeded by: Roberto Puno

32nd Secretary of the Interior and Local Government
- In office April 4, 2006 – June 30, 2010
- President: Gloria Macapagal Arroyo
- Preceded by: Angelo Reyes
- Succeeded by: Benigno Aquino III (OIC)
- In office April 12, 1999 – January 10, 2000
- President: Joseph Estrada
- Preceded by: Joseph Estrada
- Succeeded by: Alfredo Lim

Personal details
- Born: Ronaldo Villanueva Puno; April 25, 1948 (age 78) Manila, Philippines
- Party: NUP (2011–present)
- Other political affiliations: Lakas (1992–1998; 2001–2007; 2008–2011); KAMPI (2007–2008); LAMMP (1998–2001)
- Spouse: Michaela V. Puno
- Education: Ateneo de Manila University (AB); Johns Hopkins University
- Occupation: Politician

Ronaldo "Ronnie" Villanueva Puno (born April 25, 1948) is a Filipino politician who has served as the representative for Antipolo's first district since 2025, a position he previously held from 2004 to 2006. He previously served as the 32nd secretary of the interior and local government from 1999 to 2000 and from 2006 to 2010.

A political strategist, Puno supported the presidential bids of eventual winners Fidel V. Ramos, Joseph Estrada, and Gloria Macapagal Arroyo. Puno was also responsible for the campaign of vice president and United Nationalist Alliance presidential candidate Jejomar Binay for the 2016 election. During Arroyo's presidency, Puno served as the leader of KAMPI, the chief administration party during her presidency.

== Career ==
Puno has a Bachelor of Arts Degree in Political Science from the Ateneo de Manila University and Masteral Credits from Johns Hopkins University School of Advanced International Studies, and has 35 years of extensive experience in business and public relations, and administration. Serving the Philippine government for the past 22 years has brought him to assignments as a diplomat in Washington, D.C., enabled him to interact with representatives and officials of the U.S. and the Philippine government in the areas of political and private business cultures, customs, strategy formulation, and decision-making processes.

=== House of Representatives (2004–2006) ===
Puno was elected Representative of the Antipolo's first district on May 10, 2004, and declared the winner by the Local Board of Canvassers on May 14, 2004. He is the President of the Political Party KAMPI (Kabalikat ng Malayang Pilipino). He is also the Chairman of Pacific Sunrise International Holdings, Inc. and the chairman of the Board of his family business in West Virginia, United States, the North River Mountain Ranch.

=== Reappointment as DILG Secretary (2006–2008) ===
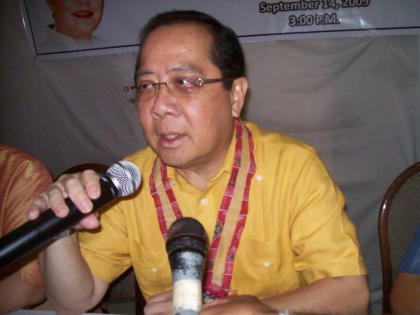
Puno in 2009.

On September 3, 2007, President Gloria Macapagal Arroyo designated Puno, DILG Secretary, as presidential adviser on political affairs in a concurrent capacity, replacing OIC, National Security Adviser Norberto Gonzales. Puno is president on leave from her party, the Kabalikat ng Malayang Pilipino. The Commission on Appointments (CA) finally confirmed on June 11, 2008, en masse several top government officials, including Puno amid walk outs by Senators Jamby Madrigal and Panfilo Lacson.

=== House of Representatives (2025–present) ===
Puno was elected Representative of the Antipolo's first district in 2025, taking the position after 19 years. At the opening of the 20th Congress, he was named as one of the Deputy Speakers.

== Television ==
Since 2026, Puno co-hosts the TV program What’s the Point? on Bilyonaryo News Channel alongside Alex Calleja.

House of Representatives of the Philippines
Preceded by Roberto V. Puno	Representative, 1st District of Antipolo City; 2025–present 2004–2006	Incumbent
New district	Representative, 1st District of Antipolo City; 2025–present 2004–2006	Vacant Title next held by Roberto V. Puno
Political offices
Preceded by Angelo Reyes	Secretary of the Interior and Local Government; 2006–2010; 1999–2000	Succeeded by Benigno Aquino III (OIC)
Preceded by Joseph Estrada	Secretary of the Interior and Local Government; 2006–2010; 1999–2000	Succeeded by Alfredo Lim
Party political offices
Preceded by Pablo P. Garcia	Chairman of the National Unity Party; 2013–present	Incumbent
