= Davonn Harp =

Filipino-American basketball player (born 1978)

Personal information
- Born: January 20, 1978 (age 48) Columbus, Ohio, U.S.
- Listed height: 6 ft 7 in (2.01 m)
- Listed weight: 225 lb (102 kg)

Career information
- High school: Brookhaven (Columbus, Ohio)
- College: Allegany (1995–1996); Towson (1996–1998); Kutztown (1998–1999)
- PBA draft: 2000: Direct Hire
- Drafted by: Batang Red Bull Energizers
- Playing career: 2000–2005
- Position: Center / power forward

Career history
- 2000–2005: Red Bull Barako

Career highlights
- 2× PBA champion (2001 Commissioner's, 2002 Commissioner's); PBA Finals MVP (2001 Commissioner's); PBA Best Player of the Conference (2002 Commissioner's); PBA Rookie of the Year (2000); PBA Mythical First Team (2002); PBA Mythical Second Team (2001); PBA Defensive Player of the Year (2002)

Davonn Harp (born January 20, 1978) is a Filipino-American former basketball player who played in the Philippine Basketball Association for the Batang Red Bull Energizers. He was one of the six players elevated by Red Bull from its PBL franchise. He played as a center. He was the PBA Rookie of the Year for the 2000 PBA season.
