= Roberto Puno =

Filipino politician

Roberto Villanueva Puno
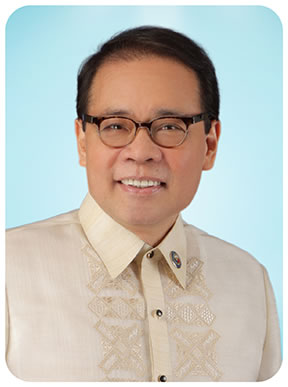
- Official portrait, 2022

Deputy Speaker of the House of Representatives of the Philippines
- In office July 25, 2022 – June 30, 2025
- Speaker: Martin Romualdez
- In office July 22, 2019 – June 1, 2022
- Speaker: Alan Peter Cayetano; Lord Allan Velasco
- In office June 30, 2013 – June 30, 2016
- Speaker: Feliciano Belmonte Jr.

Member of the Philippine House of Representatives from Antipolo's 1st district
- In office June 30, 2019 – June 30, 2025
- Preceded by: Chiqui Roa-Puno
- Succeeded by: Ronaldo Puno
- In office June 30, 2007 – June 30, 2016
- Preceded by: Vacant (post last held by Ronaldo Puno)
- Succeeded by: Chiqui Roa-Puno

Personal details
- Born: March 27, 1962 (age 64)
- Party: NUP (2011–present)
- Other political affiliations: Lakas (2007–2011)
- Spouse: Chiqui Roa
- Children: 3
- Education: Ateneo de Manila University, Georgetown University
- Occupation: Politician

Roberto Villanueva Puno (born March 27, 1962), commonly known as Robbie Puno, is a Filipino politician currently serving as a Deputy Speaker of the House of Representatives of the Philippines since July 25, 2022. A member of the National Unity Party (NUP), he represents the 1st District of Antipolo in the House of Representatives. He has held this position for multiple terms, serving from 2007 to 2016 and again from 2019 to the present.

Puno is also known for his advocacy for Philippine basketball, playing a significant role in the country's hosting of the 2023 FIBA Basketball World Cup.

== Early life and family ==
Roberto Villanueva Puno was born on March 27, 1962, in Antipolo, Rizal, Philippines. He is the son and twelfth of thirteen children of former Justice Secretary and Member of Parliament Ricardo Concepcion Puno and Priscilla Villanueva Puno.

He comes from a prominent political family. His siblings include former Press Secretary Ricardo "Dong" Puno Jr., Regis V. Puno, Roderico V. Puno, Renato "Rene" V. Puno, former Interior Secretary Ronaldo "Ronnie" Puno, and Roselle "Sela" Puno-Mapa.

== Political career ==
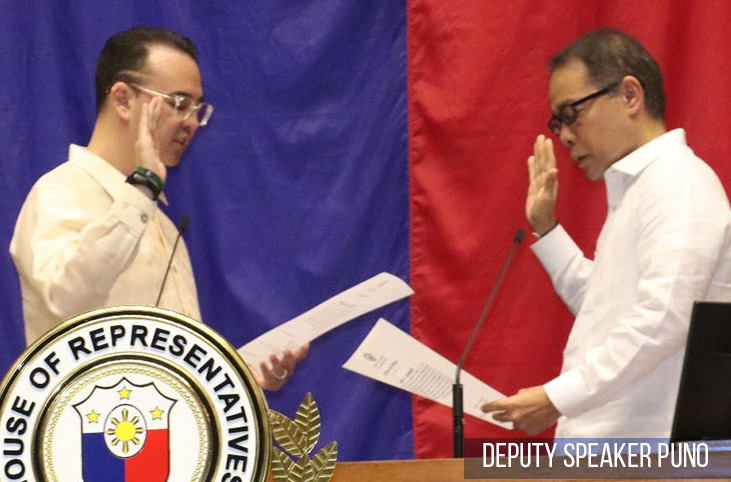
Puno taking his oath of office as Deputy House Speaker on July 27, 2019

Puno first entered the House of Representatives in 2007, representing Antipolo's 1st District. He served until 2016 and was succeeded by his wife, Chiqui Roa-Puno. He returned to Congress in 2019 and has since been re-elected. During his tenure, he has held key positions, including Deputy Speaker under Speakers Alan Peter Cayetano, Lord Allan Velasco, and Martin Romualdez.

== Personal life ==
Puno is married to Cristina "Chiqui" Roa-Puno, who also served as Representative of Antipolo’s 1st District.

Beyond politics, he is a basketball enthusiast and has worked to promote the sport in the country. His efforts were instrumental in securing the Philippines' role as a host nation for the 2023 FIBA Basketball World Cup.

House of Representatives of the Philippines
Preceded by Chiqui Roa-Puno	Member of the House of Representatives from Antipolo's 1st district 2019–present	Incumbent
Preceded by Ronaldo Puno	Member of the House of Representatives from Antipolo's 1st district 2007–2016	Succeeded by Chiqui Roa-Puno
