= Stephen Howard (basketball) =

American basketball player

Personal information
- Born: July 15, 1970 (age 56) Dallas, Texas, U.S.
- Listed height: 6 ft 9 in (2.06 m)
- Listed weight: 225 lb (102 kg)

Career information
- High school: Bishop Lynch (Dallas, Texas)
- College: DePaul (1988–1992)
- NBA draft: 1992: undrafted
- Playing career: 1992–2008
- Position: Small forward
- Number: 43, 34, 44

Career history
- 1992–1993: Utah Jazz
- 1993–1994: Pallacanestro Trapani
- 1995: Utah Jazz
- 1994–1995: Madigan Pistoia
- 1995–1996: Paris Basket Racing
- 1996: Oklahoma City Cavalry
- 1996–1997: San Antonio Spurs
- 1998: Utah Jazz
- 1997–1998: Seattle SuperSonics
- 1998–1999: Apollon Patras B.C.
- 1999: Unicaja Málaga
- 1999: Efes Pilsen
- 2000: Idaho Stampede
- 2000: San Miguel Beermen
- 2001: Gijón Baloncesto
- 2001: ALM Évreux Basket
- 2002: Capitanes de Arecibo
- 2002–2003: Hapoel Jerusalem
- 2003–2004: Café Najjar
- 2004–2005: Champville SC
- 2005: Sagesse Beirut
- 2005–2006: Al-Ittihad Jeddah
- 2006–2008: Al-Hilal

Career highlights
- PBA champion (2000 Commissioners); First-team All-Great Midwest (1992)
- Stats at NBA.com
- Stats at Basketball Reference

Stephen Christopher Howard (born July 15, 1970) is an American former professional basketball player in the National Basketball Association (NBA). He was born and raised in Dallas, Texas, and played college basketball for the DePaul Blue Demons from 1988 to 1992. He was an Academic All-American his junior and senior years. He was team captain in his senior year, and finished his career at DePaul in fifth place all time in scoring and rebounding. He also holds the school record for most free throws made in a career. He was undrafted in the 1992 NBA draft, but accepted an invitation to try out for the Utah Jazz. He made the roster and played power forward for the Jazz in 1992–1993, and then again in 1995 and 1998. He played for the San Antonio Spurs in 1996–1997, and for the Seattle SuperSonics in 1997–1998. He continued to play professionally overseas for the next ten years, competing in 12 different countries. He completed his professional career in 2008.

During his time with the Jazz, Howard was contacted by Midway Games to be one of the models for the players in NBA Jam. He also appears in the game as a secret player (the regular Jazz players in the game being Karl Malone and John Stockton).

During the 1998–99 NBA lockout, Howard and some friends opened a juice store called "Acappella" in Northern Dallas, where customers could get 25% off their final bill on weekends if they sang 10 seconds of their favorite song aloud at the counter.
