= Antipolo's 1st congressional district =

House of Representatives of the Philippines legislative district

- Constituency for the House of Representatives of the Philippines
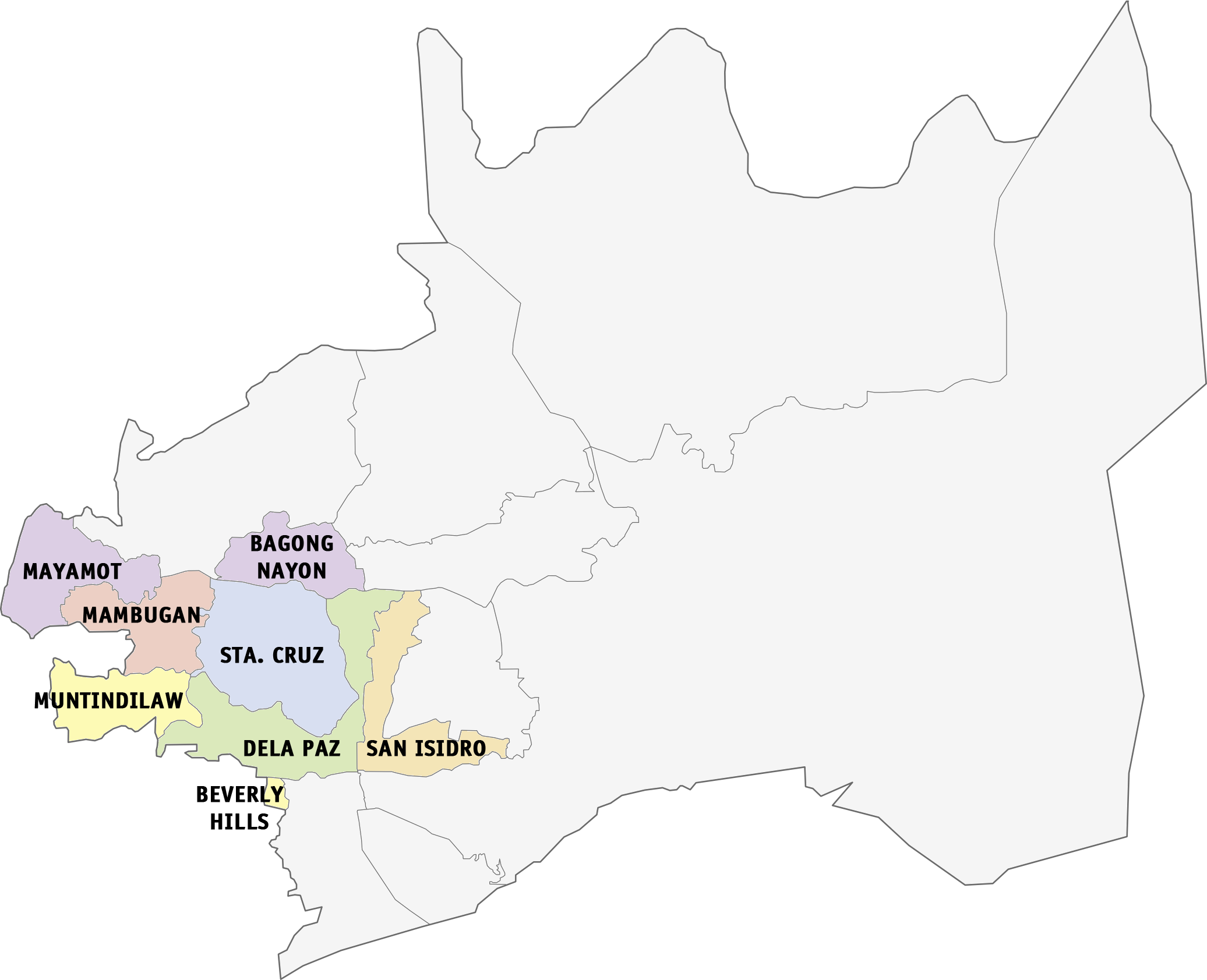
- Boundary of Antipolo's 1st congressional district in Antipolo

- Location of Antipolo within the province of Rizal
- City: Antipolo
- Province: Rizal, Calabarzon
- Population: 379,568 (2020)
- Electorate: 224,611 (2019)
- Major settlements: 8 barangays: Bagong Nayon; Beverly Hills; De La Paz; Mambugan; Mayamot; Munting Dilao; San Isidro; Santa Cruz
- Area: 35.15 km^{2} (13.57 sq mi)

Current constituency
- Created: 2003
- Representative: Ronaldo Puno
- Political party: NUP
- Congressional bloc: Majority

Antipolo's 1st congressional district is one of the two congressional districts of the Philippines in the city of Antipolo and one of four in the province of Rizal. It has been represented in the House of Representatives of the Philippines since 2004. The district consists of the western Antipolo barangays of Bagong Nayon, Beverly Hills, De La Paz, Mambugan, Mayamot, Munting Dilao, San Isidro and Santa Cruz. It is currently represented in the 20th Congress by Ronaldo Puno of the National Unity Party (NUP).

== List of members representing the district ==
=== House of Representatives (1987–present) ===
No.	Portrait	Member	Term of office		Legislature	Party	Electoral history	Constituent LGUs
No.	Portrait	Member	Start	End	Legislature	Party	Electoral history	Constituent LGUs
District created December 22, 2003 from Antipolo's at large district.
1		Ronaldo Puno	June 30, 2004	February 13, 2006	13th	Lakas	Elected in 2004. Resigned on appointment as Secretary of the Interior and Local Government.	2004–present Bagong Nayon, Beverly Hills, De La Paz, Mambugan, Mayamot, Munting Dilao, San Isidro, Santa Cruz
Vacant			February 14, 2006	June 30, 2007	13th	—	No special election held to fill vacancy.	2004–present Bagong Nayon, Beverly Hills, De La Paz, Mambugan, Mayamot, Munting Dilao, San Isidro, Santa Cruz
2		Roberto Puno	June 30, 2007	June 30, 2016	14th	Lakas	Elected in 2007.	2004–present Bagong Nayon, Beverly Hills, De La Paz, Mambugan, Mayamot, Munting Dilao, San Isidro, Santa Cruz
2		Roberto Puno	June 30, 2007	June 30, 2016	15th	NUP	Re-elected in 2010.	2004–present Bagong Nayon, Beverly Hills, De La Paz, Mambugan, Mayamot, Munting Dilao, San Isidro, Santa Cruz
2		Roberto Puno	June 30, 2007	June 30, 2016	16th	NUP	Re-elected in 2013.	2004–present Bagong Nayon, Beverly Hills, De La Paz, Mambugan, Mayamot, Munting Dilao, San Isidro, Santa Cruz
3		Chiqui Roa-Puno	June 30, 2016	June 30, 2019	17th	NUP	Elected in 2016.	2004–present Bagong Nayon, Beverly Hills, De La Paz, Mambugan, Mayamot, Munting Dilao, San Isidro, Santa Cruz
(2)		Roberto Puno	June 30, 2019	June 30, 2025	18th	NUP	Elected in 2019.	2004–present Bagong Nayon, Beverly Hills, De La Paz, Mambugan, Mayamot, Munting Dilao, San Isidro, Santa Cruz
(2)		Roberto Puno	June 30, 2019	June 30, 2025	19th	NUP	Re-elected in 2022.	2004–present Bagong Nayon, Beverly Hills, De La Paz, Mambugan, Mayamot, Munting Dilao, San Isidro, Santa Cruz
(1)		Ronaldo Puno	June 30, 2025	Incumbent	20th	NUP	Elected in 2025	2004–present Bagong Nayon, Beverly Hills, De La Paz, Mambugan, Mayamot, Munting Dilao, San Isidro, Santa Cruz

== Election results ==
=== 2013 ===
2013 Philippine House of Representatives elections in Antipolo
Party	Candidate	Votes	%
NUP	Roberto Puno (incumbent)	86,705	76.78
Independent	Francisco Sumulong Jr.	20,391	18.06
Independent	Dioscoro Esteban Jr.	3,369	2.98
Independent	Florante Quizon	1,608	1.42
Independent	Salvador Raldy Abaño	851	0.75
Total votes		26,219	100.00
NUP hold			

=== 2016 ===
2016 Philippine House of Representatives elections in Antipolo
Party	Candidate	Votes	%
NUP	Chiqui Roa-Puno	102,093	71.10
Aksyon	Juanito Lawis	17,183	11.97
Independent	Sonia Ampo	4,279	2.98
Independent	Florante Quizon	2,004	1.40
Total votes		125,559	100.00
NUP hold			

=== 2019 ===
2019 Philippine House of Representatives elections in Antipolo
Party	Candidate	Votes	%
NUP	Roberto Puno	107,140	93.01
Independent	Macario Aggarao	8,056	6.99
Total votes		115,196	100.00
NUP hold			

=== 2022 ===
2022 Philippine House of Representatives elections in Antipolo
Party	Candidate	Votes	%
NUP	Roberto Puno (incumbent)	131,611	93.87
Independent	Salvador Abaño	5,150	3.67
Independent	Javez Tibio	3,452	2.46
Total votes		140,213	100.00
NUP hold			

=== 2025 ===
2025 Philippine House of Representatives elections in Antipolo
Party	Candidate	Votes	%
NUP	Ronaldo Puno	119,885	87.31
Independent	Manuel Relorcasa	9,113	6.64
WPP	Sonia Ampo	8,332	6.07
Total votes		137,330	100.00
NUP hold			

== See also ==
- Legislative districts of Antipolo
