= Sev Sarmenta =

Filipino sportscaster

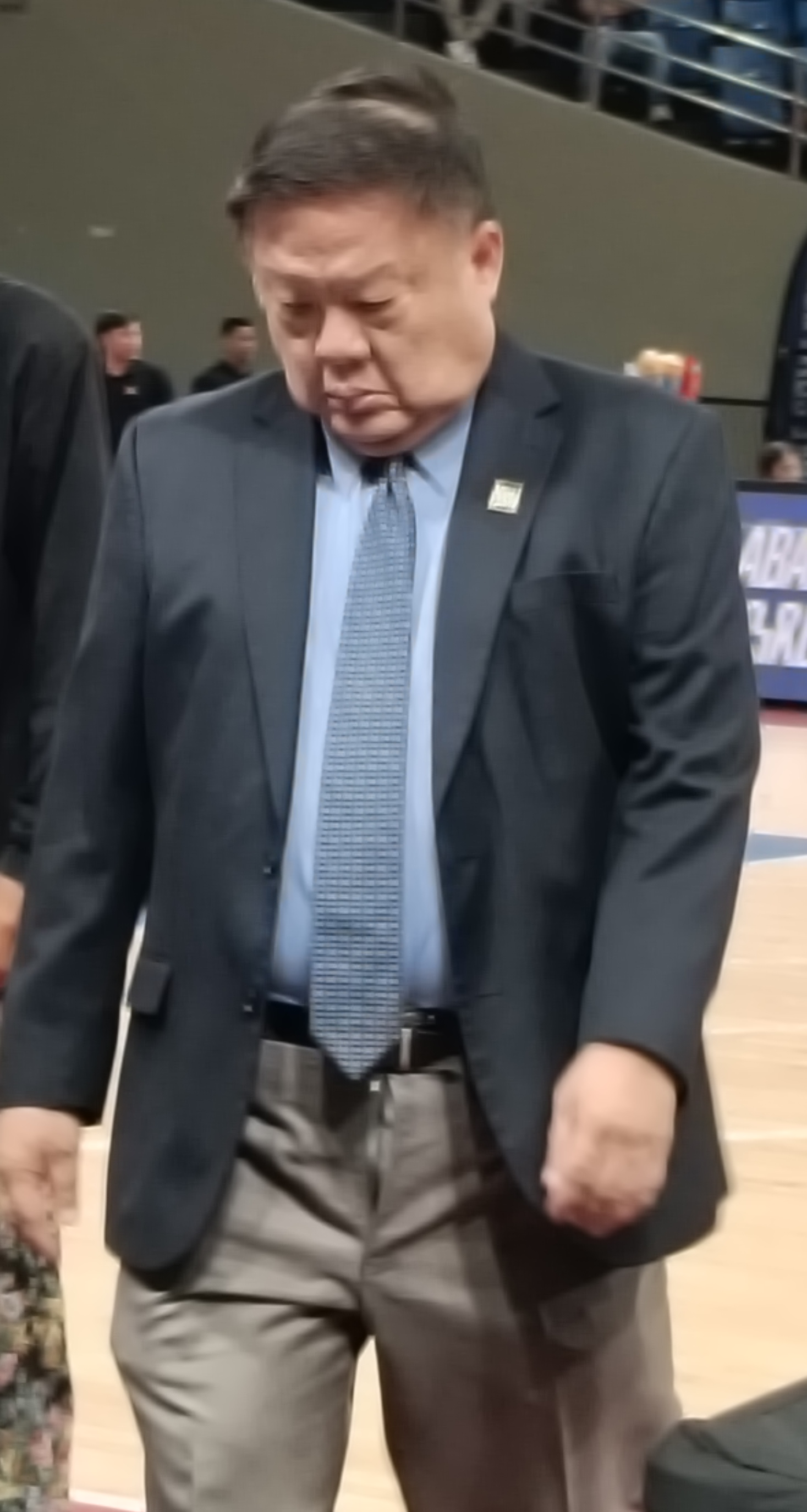
- Sarmenta in 2025
- Born: Severino R. Sarmenta; December 5, 1954 (age 71)
- Education: Ateneo de Manila University
- Years active: 1987–present
- Title: Sportscaster
- Sports commentary career
- Genre: Play-by-play
- Sports: Basketball; Boxing; Volleyball

Severino R. Sarmenta is a Filipino sportscaster and college instructor.

== Career ==
After graduating with a degree in AB Communication in 1978 at Ateneo, he pursued a career in fields like advertising, copywriting, business, and freelance work. After those jobs, he started his career at St. Joseph's College Quezon City then the University of the Philippines Diliman as a college instructor, and later for Ateneo in 1985. One of this notable students in Ateneo was Mico Halili, a colleague in PBA and UAAP coverages.

He later started his commentary career in 1986 for radio coverage of PBA, and later in 1987 for Vintage Sports on TV. He also become boxing commentator for Blow-by-Blow.

He left the coverage team in 1996, and joined the newly founded ABS-CBN Sports in 1998, with UAAP and MBA coverages. He later leave to join the NBN/IBC crew in 2003, but returned to ABS-CBN in 2004 and stayed until 2007.

In 2008, he returned to PBA coverages.
