= Nate Johnson (basketball, born 1977) =

American basketball player

Personal information
- Born: September 8, 1977 (age 48) Camden, New Jersey, U.S.
- Listed height: 6 ft 6.5 in (1.99 m)
- Listed weight: 215 lb (98 kg)

Career information
- High school: Camden (Camden, New Jersey)
- College: Louisville (1996–2000)
- NBA draft: 2000: undrafted
- Playing career: 2000–2013

Career history
- 2000–2001: Darüşşafaka S.K.
- 2001: Cincinnati Stuff
- 2001: San Miguel Beermen
- 2001–2003: Columbus Riverdragons
- 2003: STB Le Havre
- 2003–2004: Pallacanestro Cantù
- 2004–2005: Daegu Orions
- 2005–2007: Seoul Samsung Thunders
- 2007: Aget Imola
- 2007–2008: Zain Club
- 2008–2011: Sporting Al Riyadi Beirut
- 2011–2012: Sagesse Beirut
- 2012–2013: Al-Ahli Jeddah

Career highlights
- Italian Supercup MVP (2003); All-NBDL Second Team (2003); Conference USA Freshman of the Year (1997)

Nathanel Johnson (born September 8, 1977) is an American former professional basketball player who last played for Al-Ahli Jeddah in Saudi Arabia. He previously played for Al Riyadi Beirut and Hekmeh (Sagesse) in the Lebanese Basketball League.
