= Chino Trinidad =

Filipino basketball sports journalist and league commissioner (1967–2024)

- Trinidad in 2020

1st Commissioner of the Sharks Billiards Association
- In office May 7, 2024 – July 13, 2024

8th Commissioner of the Philippine Basketball League
- In office 2000–2010
- Preceded by: Yeng Guiao
- Succeeded by: Nolan Bernardino

Personal details
- Born: Manolo Lacsamana Trinidad; July 23, 1967 Philippines
- Died: July 13, 2024 (aged 56) Pasay, Philippines
- Education: University of the Philippines Diliman
- Occupation: Sports journalist; executive
- Parents: Recah Trinidad (father); Ma. Fe Lacsamana (mother)
- Sports commentary career
- Genre: Color commnetator/Game analyst
- Sports: Basketball; Boxing

Manolo "Chino" Lacsamana Trinidad (July 23, 1967 – July 13, 2024) was a Filipino sports journalist and executive who formerly served as a play-by-play commentator in the Philippine Basketball Association (PBA) coverage by Vintage Television.

== Career ==
=== Sportscasting ===
Trinidad started in Balitang Bayan Numero Uno's Sports Ngayon segment from 1991 to 1998 in DZRH. He started a sideline reporter from 1993 to 1995, on Vintage Television's PBA coverage. He later worked as a play-by-play commentator not only on basketball games, but also on boxing games, like Blow-by-Blow. His notable play-by-play game was the do-or-die upset of Barangay Ginebra against Mobiline Phone Pals in 1999 PBA All-Filipino Cup quarterfinals. He also worked as a sports reporter on GMA News.

In 2007, he served as a play-by-play in RPN's coverage of 2007 FIBA Asia Championship.

=== Sports management ===
He also served as the commissioner of Philippine Basketball League starting in 2000, replacing Yeng Guiao, his notable color commentator partner in PBA coverages. He resigned in 2010. He was also a founding member of Samahang Basketball ng Pilipinas (SBP). He was one of the personalities who pushed for the rights of SBP as the Philippine basketball federation and fight against the failures of its predecessor, the Basketball Association of the Philippines.

He was later a candidate in the positions like basketball commissioner of the University Athletic Association of the Philippines in 2014, and Chairman of Games and Amusement Board (GAB). He was later appointed as Pilipinas VisMin Super Cup consultant.

In May 2024, Trinidad was appointed the commissioner of its first professional pool league in the Philippines, the Sharks Billiards Association. He was also an adviser of the Pilipinas Super League.

=== Others ===
After resigning in GMA, Trinidad focused on his founded cable TV channel named Pilipinas HD.

In 2014, he led "Pagpupugay", a tribute to Filipino sports heroes. That tribute got minor citation from the PSA Annual Awards in 2015.

He criticized Chot Reyes and the SBP for mishandling the team in 2023 FIBA World Cup.

Beside of being a former boxing play-by-play commentator, he also a contributor to Philippine boxing.

== Personal life and death ==
Trinidad was the son of sports columnist Recah Trinidad and Fe Lacsamana. He is also related to former PBA superstar Mark Caguioa.

His grandfather, Macario Trinidad served as acting mayor of Mandaluyong in 1963.

On the night of July 13, 2024, Trinidad died from a heart attack at the San Juan de Dios Hospital in Pasay at the age of 56 (ten days short of his 57th birthday). Trinidad was on his way to the Newport World Resorts to meet with people including pool player Efren Reyes.

Trinidad's funeral service was held on 15 July, following his cremation five days later.

== Appearances ==
Year	Title	Role	Notes
1993–1995	PBA on Vintage Sports	Courtside reporter	
1995–1999	PBA on Vintage Sports	Play-by-play	
2000–2002	PBA on Viva TV	Play-by-play	
2001–2004	Teledyaryo	News Anchor	
2006–2023	24 Oras	Reporter	Sports segment: "Time Out"
2007	Pinoy Meets World	Host	San Antonio, Texas and Cleveland, Ohio episode
2007–2008	100% Pinoy!	Host	
2008	Pinoy Meets World	Host	Boston, Massachusetts and Los Angeles, California episode
2011–2012; 2017–2019	Saksi sa Dobol B	Reporter	Sports segment: "Sports Saksi"
2023	Bolera	Guest appearance	Acting billiard announcement / host
