= Art dela Cruz =

FilipIno basketball player and coach

Arturo dela Cruz
Personal information
- Born: November 29, 1964 (age 61)
- Listed height: 6 ft 3 in (1.91 m)
- Listed weight: 170 lb (77 kg)

Career information
- College: San Sebastian
- PBA draft: 1991: 1st round, 4th overall pick
- Drafted by: San Miguel Beermen
- Playing career: 1991–2000
- Position: Small forward
- Number: 15, 18
- Coaching career: 2001–2020

Career history

Playing
- 1991–2000: San Miguel Beermen

Coaching
- 2001–2006: San Miguel Beermen (assistant)
- 2006–2013: Barangay Ginebra Kings (assistant)
- 2013–2016: Barako Bull Energy (assistant)
- 2016: Phoenix Fuel Masters (assistant)
- 2016–2017: TNT KaTropa (assistant)
- 2017–2020: Terrafirma Dyip (assistant)

Career highlights
- As player: 7× PBA champion (1992 All-Filipino, 1993 Governors', 1994 All-Filipino, 1999 Commissioner's, 1999 Governors', 2000 Commissioner's, 2000 Governors'); 4× NCAA champions (1986, 1988, 1989, 1990); As assistant coach: 4× PBA champion (2001 All-Filipino, 2005 Fiesta, 2007 Philippine, 2008 Fiesta)

Arturo "Art" dela Cruz is a retired Filipino professional basketball player and coach who specializes in defense end. He is the father of former San Beda Red Lion Arthur dela Cruz.

== Career ==
=== Playing ===
A former San Sebastian Stag, Dela Cruz was drafted and played for San Miguel Beermen from 1991 until 2000.

=== Coaching ===
After retiring, he joined the Beermen as an assistant coach. When Jong Uichico, his former coach at his final two years and first years of being assistant to Beermen's coaching staff reassigned to Barangay Ginebra Kings, he also joined him. He stayed until 2013, even Uichico was replaced in 2012.

He later joined the Barako Bull Energy, but when the team was became Phoenix Fuel Masters, he still stayed until Koy Banal was replaced by Ariel Vanguardia. He later joined TNT KaTropa, when Uichico was also there.

He later hired by Terrafirma Dyip as their assistant coach in 2017, and assigned consultant in 2018 to 2019. He stayed with the Dyip until 2020. He was replaced by Gian Nazario on his position.
