= Jannelle So =

Filipino journalist and broadcaster (born 1977)

Jannelle So-Perkins
- Born: September 9, 1977 (age 49); Philippines
- Other name: Jannelle So
- Education: Miriam College
- Occupations: Journalist, broadcaster
- Notable work: Kababayan L.A./Kababaan Today
- Spouse: Lester Perkins
- Children: 2
- Website: sojannelle.com

Jannelle So-Perkins (born September 9, 1977) is a Filipino journalist and broadcaster known for her work as the creator, host and producer of "Kababayan Today" (formerly "Kababayan L.A.), a daily show magazine/talk show for and about Filipinos airing on KSCI (LA-18) television. Under her leadership, the show ran for 9 years, as the longest-running Filipino daily talk show outside of the Philippines. She left the show in June 2014.

== Early life and education ==
Born and raised in the Philippines, So is of Chinese, Filipino and Spanish descent. Her last name is Chinese, meaning "happiness". She is the daughter of a Chinese entrepreneur who, together with his Filipina wife, built and established a clothing manufacturing business, supplying ready-to-wear merchandise to several leading Philippine department stores.

So attended Saint Theresa's College of Quezon City for her elementary and high school education. She holds a Bachelor of Arts degree in Communication Arts. She graduated cum laude and was awarded second honors of the whole graduating class from Miriam College, Philippines, where she was an honor scholar. In 1998, she was nominated to the Top 10 Most Outstanding Students of the Philippines.

== Career ==
So was an accomplished media practitioner in the Philippines where she had a six-year print and broadcast journalism career, which includes coverage of top local and international events such as:

- 1997 ASEAN Informal Summit in Malaysia,
- 1998 Asian Games in Bangkok
- 1998 Philippine Presidential Elections,
- 1998 Centennial Celebrations in the Philippines.
- 2002 Asian Games in Korea

As a courtside reporter for Vintage Television, she covered the Philippine Basketball Association games from 1997–2003, while also covering other basketball leagues - NCAA, PBL. She also hosted a weekly sports show and a weekly travel/culture show commissioned by the Philippines' National Commission on Culture and the Arts.

So has also been covering the fights of Philippine boxing pride, Manny Pacquiao since 2000.

As a columnist for the Philippine Star, So "The Score" - a weekly sports column, from 1999–2004; as well as "So Goes" - a weekly lifestyle column from, 2002–2006.

== Emigration to USA ==
So moved to the United States in 2003 with her family, leaving behind a budding career as a sportscaster for the Philippine Basketball Association.

She lends herself to other non-profit organizations in Southern California such as The Philippine Medical Association of Southern California as event emcee and as keynote speaker.

She completed a certificate course in journalism at UCLA and did freelance writing for Young Money and Audrey before coming to Kababayan L.A. So has also worked as a correspondent for various news programs airing on The Filipino Channel.

=== Kababayan LA ===
So started a daily talk/magazine show, “Kababayan LA” on 2007, the fifth anniversary was celebrated on 2011. She received Honorable Mention from the Los Angeles Press Club at the 53rd Annual Southern California Journalism Awards.

She has been recently named to 100 Most Influential Filipinas in the US by the San Francisco-based Filipina Women's Network. In 2013, she won the New America Media Award for Outstanding Community Reporting for Television. The award was in recognition of her work "Human Trafficking Special: A 4-Part Series".

So was recognized by different Filipino organizations such as Search to Involve Pilipino Americans (SIPA) and Filipino American Library (FAL) because of her work on her program Kababayan L.A.

== Personal life ==
So is married to British-born director and former media executive Lester Perkins, and have two children together.
