= Chiqui Roa-Puno =

Filipino sportscaster and politician

The Honorable Chiqui Roa-Puno

Member of the Philippine House of Representatives from Antipolo's 1st congressional district
- In office June 30, 2016 – June 30, 2019
- Preceded by: Roberto Puno
- Succeeded by: Roberto Puno

Personal details
- Born: Maria Cristina Anson Roa; March 28, 1970 (age 56)
- Party: National Unity Party
- Spouse: Roberto Puno
- Parent: Boots Anson-Roa (mother)
- Occupation: Politician, Sportscaster

Maria Cristina "Chiqui" Anson Roa-Puno (born March 28, 1970) is a Filipina sportscaster and politician. A member of the National Unity Party, she was elected as a Member of the House of Representatives, representing Antipolo's 1st district, serving from 2016 until 2019.
