= Joaquin Henson =

Filipino sports analyst (born 1950)

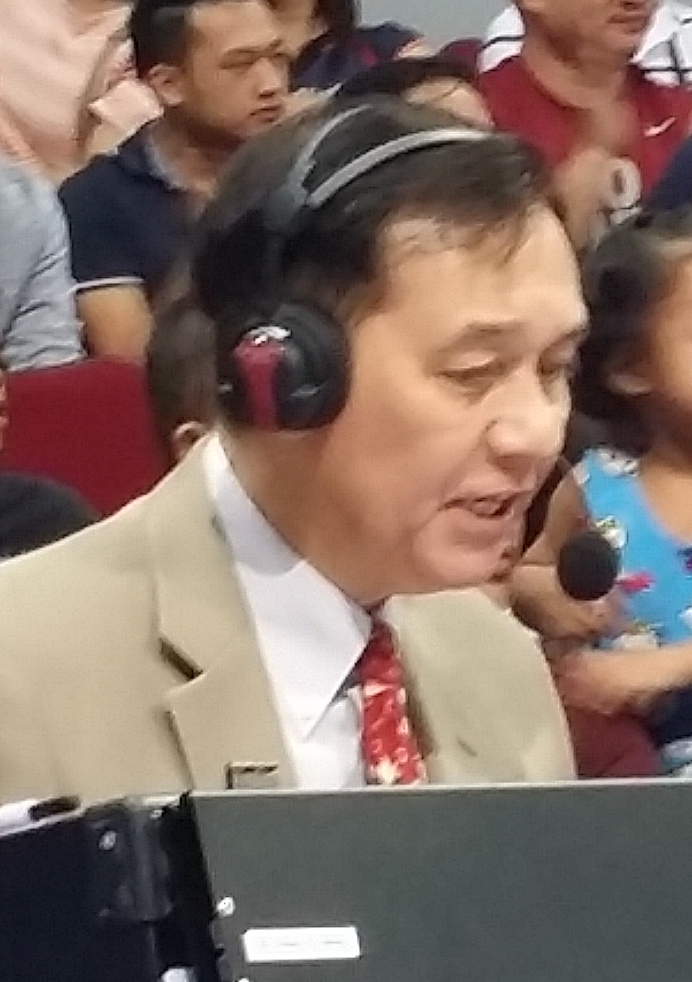
- Henson in 2015.
- Born: Joaquin M. Henson; October 13, 1950 (age 75)
- Other name: The Dean
- Education: De La Salle University
- Years active: 1982–present
- Title: Sportscaster
- Spouse: Menchu Genato
- Children: Tina Henson
- Relatives: Tony Genato (uncle-in-law)
- Sports commentary career
- Genre: Color commnetator/Game analyst
- Sports: Basketball; Boxing

Joaquin M. Henson (born October 13, 1950), also known as Quinito Henson, is a Filipino sports analyst and television color commentator. His newspaper column, Sporting Chance, has appeared in the Philippine Star since the 1980s. Referred to as "The Dean", coined by TV commentator Randy Sacdalan. He himself is known to give nicknames to various athletes, such as "Captain Lionheart" for Alvin Patrimonio and "Tower of Power" for Benjie Paras.

== Career ==
Henson graduated from the De La Salle University in 1973 and began his career in sports journalism shortly thereafter. Beginning in 1982, Henson was featured as one of the color commentators in the television broadcast of the games of the Philippine Basketball Association by Vintage Sports. He was retained as a television analyst by the various television networks that acquired the broadcasting rights over the PBA games after Vintage lost the rights in 2002. As of 2022, he is among the pool of sportscasters who covered the broadcast of PBA games on One Sports.

Henson is noted as an expert on the National Basketball Association, a frequent subject of his newspaper column. In the 1980s, he served as host of the then once-a-week broadcast of NBA games on GMA Network. In the 1990s up to the present, he is a lead color-commentator on the Philippine live broadcast coverage of the NBA Finals, broadcasting live on site all but one series (2002) from 1997 to 2008. He presently is a member of the NBA Blog Squad, a group of bloggers whose blogs are featured on the official website of the National Basketball Association.

Henson also frequently writes about boxing and has frequently worked as an analyst on marquee fights featuring Filipino boxers, such as those of boxing champion Manny Pacquiao. He is often paired on these broadcasts with the Sri Lankan-born Blow-by-Blow announcer Ronnie Nathanielsz.

Henson was honored with the first-ever Olympism Award from the Philippine Olympic Committee for excellence in journalism in 2004, as well as the first-ever Philippine Catholic Mass Media Award in the sports column category in 2005.

== Personal life ==
His wife Menchu was a commercial spokesperson featured in Philippine advertisements for Nestlé's Maggi product line.
