= Ronnie Nathanielsz =

Filipino journalist

- Born: Ronald Fredrick William Nathanielsz; November 2, 1935; Colombo, British Ceylon (now Colombo, Sri Lanka)
- Died: November 11, 2016 (aged 81); Burlingame, California, U.S.
- Resting place: Manila Memorial Park – Sucat, Parañaque
- Occupations: Sport journalist; Commentator; Sport analyst
- Years active: c. 1965–2016

Ronald Fredrick William Nathanielsz (November 3, 1935 – November 11, 2016), was a Sri Lankan-born Filipino sports journalist, commentator and analyst.

== Early life ==
Nathanielsz was born in Ceylon (now Sri Lanka) in 1935. He was the eldest son of Elmo Nathanielsz and his wife Phyllis (née Labrooy) of Colombo.

He and his brother-in-law, Annesley 'Bunny' Joseph, belonged to the same boxing club in their youth. They trained under former Ceylon flyweight champion Henry Young, who thought Ronnie could become an Olympic boxer. However, at age 17 or 18, Nathanielsz was diagnosed with an irregular heartbeat, ending his boxing career.

== Career ==
In 1965, Nathanielsz was working for radio station DZHP. He worked as a columnist for the sports section of the Manila Standard-Today and Philippine Daily Inquirer newspapers. For Inquirer, he wrote the section Inside Sports back in 2011. He was also involved in various sports promotions in boxing. At the Philippine Basketball Association from the 1980s until the early 1990s, he covered basketball matches on camera. He primarily focused on covering the sport of boxing in his whole sports journalism career.

Then-President Ferdinand Marcos granted Philippine citizenship to Nathanielsz on May 14, 1973, through Presidential Decree 192.

In 1975, Nathanielsz was appointed by then-President Marcos as a liaison officer between the Philippine government and the organizers of the Thrilla in Manila boxing match (Muhammad Ali vs. Joe Frazier). A few years later, he became the news director and general manager of the Maharlika Broadcasting System, the former brand of Channel 4.

His staunch loyalty to Marcos received some criticisms. In GTV-4's Face the Nation, a talk-show that Nathanielsz hosted, his independence was challenged by Benigno Aquino Jr.

He turned down an offer from his father's friend to handle a weekly boxing show in Australia, much to the annoyance of his father.

== Personal life ==
He was married to Amelia with whom he had a son and a daughter. He and his family moved to the Philippines in 1962.

== Death ==
Nathanielsz experienced chest pains on November 3, 2016, while en route to Las Vegas, where he was scheduled to join a TV broadcast panel, to cover Manny Pacquiao's fight against Jessie Vargas on November 5. He was then brought to the intensive care unit of the Mills-Peninsula Medical Centers in Burlingame, California. He later died on November 11, 2016 (Pacific Standard Time), of a cardiac arrest. He was 81 years old.
