= Ed Picson =

Filipino sportscaster (1953–2023)

- Born: Edgar E. Picson; July 10, 1953; Leyte, Philippines
- Died: April 19, 2023 (aged 69); Taguig, Philippines
- Occupations: Sportscaster; sports administrator; journalist; actor
- Years active: 1980s–2023

Edgar E. Picson (July 10, 1953 – April 19, 2023) was a Filipino sportscaster, sports administrator, columnist and television actor.

Picson was known for being a commentator in the Philippine Basketball Association from the 1990s to the early 2000s. He was president of the Association of Boxing Alliances in the Philippines from November 2021 until his death in 2023.

== Education ==
Picson attended the Colegio de San Juan de Letran.

== Career ==
Picson was an anchor and commentator in the Philippine Basketball Association from the 1980s to the early 2000s largely under Vintage Sports. He was also a commentator for the sports boxing program Blow by Blow in the 1990s which featured the early bouts of Manny Pacquiao. He also has a recurring role in the television sitcom John en Marsha in the 1980s.

Picson also worked for Sports Radio 918 (now Radyo Pilipinas 2). He was a sports columnist for the Manila Bulletin. He was also a part-time actor appearing in John en Marsha which featured Dolphy and 2+2 with Vic Sotto.

In November 2021, Picson was elected as president of the Association of Boxing Alliances in the Philippines (ABAP), succeeding Ricky Vargas. Part of ABAP since 2009, he has also previously served as an executive director and a secretary-general. He died in office.

== Personal life and death ==
Picson was a native of Leyte. He was married to Karina Picson and had two children.

Picson died due to complications of liver cancer on April 19, 2023, while confined at the St. Luke's Medical Center in Taguig. He was 69 years old.
