= Philippines at the 1990 Asian Games =

- IOC code: PHI
- NOC: Philippine Olympic Committee
- Website: www.olympic.ph (in English)

in Beijing
- Medals Ranked 13th: Gold 1 Silver 2 Bronze 7 Total 10

Asian Games appearances (overview)
- 1951; 1954; 1958; 1962; 1966; 1970; 1974; 1978; 1982; 1986; 1990; 1994; 1998; 2002; 2006; 2010; 2014; 2018; 2022; 2026

The Philippines participated in the 1990 Asian Games held in Beijing, China from September 22 to October 7, 1990. Ranked 13th with 1 gold medal, 2 silver medals and 7 bronze medals with a total of 10 over-all medals.

== Asian Games Performance ==
Boxer Roberto Jalnaiz secured the delegation’s only gold medal after winning the bantamweight division by stoppage. His victory accounted for the Philippine team’s sole top finish and marked a modest improvement over the country’s performance at the 1974 Tehran Games, where the contingent did not capture a gold medal.

== Medalists ==
The following Philippine competitors won medals at the Games.

=== Gold ===
No.	Medal	Name	Sport	Event
1	Gold	Roberto Jalnaiz	Boxing	Bantamweight 54kg

=== Silver ===
No.	Medal	Name	Sport	Event
1	Silver	Allan Caidic; Hector Calma; Rey Cuenco; Yves Dignadice; Ramon Fernandez; Dante Gonzalgo; Samboy Lim; Chito Loyzaga; Ronnie Magsanoc; Alvin Patrimonio; Benjie Paras; Zaldy Realubit; Coach: Robert Jaworski	Basketball	Men's Team
2	Silver	Ramon Brobio; Felix Casas; Vince Lauron; Danilo Zarate	Golf	Men's Team

=== Bronze ===
No.	Medal	Name	Sport	Event
1	Bronze	Elma Muros	Athletics	Women's 400m Hurdles
2	Bronze	Elias Recaido	Boxing	Light flyweight 48kg
3	Bronze	Leopoldo Cantancio	Boxing	Lightweight 60kg
4	Bronze	Arlo Chavez	Boxing	Light welterweight 63.5kg
5	Bronze	Ramon Brobio	Golf	Men's Individual
6	Bronze	Jamille Jose	Golf	Women's Individual
7	Bronze	Ruby Chico; Yvtte de Leon; Mary Grace Estuesta; Jamille Jose	Golf	Women's Team

=== Multiple ===
Name	Sport	Gold	Silver	Bronze	Total
Ramon Brobio	Golf	0	1	1	2
Jamille Jose	Golf	0	0	2	2

== Medal summary ==
=== Medal by sports ===
Sport	Gold	Silver	Bronze	Total
Boxing	1	0	4	5
Golf	0	1	2	3
Basketball	0	1	0	1
Athletics	0	0	1	1
Totals (4 entries)	1	2	7	10

== Basketball ==
1990 Philippines Asian Games basketball team
- 1990 Asian Games: Silver
Uniform
Uniform

The 1990 Philippines men's national basketball team, nicknamed the "Philippines Dream Team", competed in the 1990 Asian Games. It was fully made up of professional players from the Philippine Basketball Association. This was the first time that the country ever sent a national team made up of professionals players. However, unlike the United States' Dream Team, this team was called such because its main goal was to wrest back Asian basketball supremacy from teams such as China. The nickname was given only recently, after the failures of the succeeding all-pro national teams in the FIBA-sanctioned tournaments, more than a decade after the team had finished competing in the said tournament.

=== Formation ===
In 1989, FIBA made a rule change for an "open basketball", which would allow players in professional, commercial or club ranks to play in any international events instead of the old ruling of only allowing amateur players. This led to the PBA and the Basketball Association of the Philippines forging a deal to have an all-pro squad to send a team to the 1990 Asian Games in Beijing. The team consist of some of the greatest players in Philippine basketball and about half of the team were named in the PBA Top 25 all-time Greatest Players ten years later.

Añejo Rum playing coach Robert Jaworski was named head coach of the squad with San Miguel Beer head coach Norman Black as assistant coach. With only two weeks to prepare, Jaworski assembled the lineup made of some of the best players in the league:

Pos	No.	Player	PBA Team
G/F	8	Allan Caidic	Presto Tivoli
PG	4	Hector Calma	San Miguel Beermen
F/C	15	Rey Cuenco	Añejo Rum 65
F/C	12	Yves Dignadice	San Miguel Beermen
F/C	10	Ramon Fernandez	San Miguel Beermen
SF	11	Dante Gonzalgo	Añejo Rum 65
SG/SF	9	Samboy Lim	San Miguel Beermen
SF/PF	14	Chito Loyzaga	Añejo Rum 65
PG	5	Ronnie Magsanoc	Formula Shell
C	7	Benjie Paras	Formula Shell
PF	6	Alvin Patrimonio	Purefoods Hotdogs
F/C	13	Zaldy Realubit	Presto Tivoli

Four players were taken from San Miguel, a year after they won the coveted Grand Slam, with Jaworski inserting former teammate and former rival Mon Fernandez in the lineup. Cuenco, Gonzalgo and Loyzaga, players for Jaworski's Añejo squad were included in the list. Purefoods center Jerry Codinera was originally named in the 12-man line-up but was stricken with hepatitis weeks before the Games and eventually replaced by Zaldy Realubit. Nelson Asaytono and Paul Alvarez were part of the pool as alternates though they did not join the team to Beijing.

=== Asian Games ===
Philippines at the 1990 Asian Games
Medal record

Men's basketball

Representing Philippines

Asian Games
Silver medal – second place	1990 Beijing	Team competition

The Philippines won their first three assignments against Pakistan, Japan and North Korea by an average of 24 points. However, the Filipinos lost in their fourth assignment against host China with a score of 125–60. The team came from behind to beat United Arab Emirates and repeated against Japan in the semifinals, 94–90, to set up a rematch against China in the championship game.

In the championship, China defeated the Philippines 90–74, a far better performance from their 65-point blowout in their first meeting. The silver medal finish was the Philippines' best since winning the 1962 Asian Games. Another consolation the team got were the inclusion of Allan Caidic and Samboy Lim in the tournament's mythical five selection.

=== Aftermath ===
The Philippines sent another all-pro squad in the next three Asian Games. The 1994 team was made up mostly of the San Miguel Beer squad, an incentive for winning the All-Filipino Cup championship. However, depleted by injuries, San Miguel acquired players from other teams along with amateur such as Alvin Patrimonio, Jerry Codiñera, Johnny Abarrientos, Marlou Aquino and Kenneth Duremdes. But the country went home without a medal finishing fourth behind China, South Korea and Japan.

In 1998, the a third all-PBA squad was sent and was dubbed as the Philippine Centennial Team coached by Tim Cone. Led by Abarrientos, Duremdes, Aquino, Patrimonio and Vergel Meneses, the country failed to win the gold medal after losing by nine points to China with future NBA player Wang Zhizhi in the semifinals. The country was relegated to a third-place game against Kazashztan and won the bronze medal in close-fought match.

Four years later in Busan, the country went home empty-handed after a disappointing fourth-place finish. The Filipinos, mostly led by Filipino-American players, were handed a heart-breaking loss to host South Korea in the semis thanks to a Lee Sang-Min buzzer-beating three-pointer. The next day, the Philippines lost to the Kazazhs for the bronze medal. Jong Uichico coached the 2002 squad.

The PBA was supposed to abandon the Asian Games for the FIBA-Asia Championships, which at stake is a World Championship or an Olympic slot, after a 2004 deal with the BAP. But a two-year suspension was handed out denying the country a chance to play for those events mentioned including the 2006 Doha Asian Games. The country has since been lifted off the suspension after the formation of the Samahang Basketbol ng Pilipinas.

Squad list	Preliminary round		Quarterfinal		Semifinals	Final	Rank
Squad list	Group C	Rank	Group D	Rank	Semifinals	Final	Rank
Allan Caidic; Hector Calma; Rey Cuenco; Yves Dignadice; Ramon Fernandez; Dante Gonzalgo; Samboy Lim; Chito Loyzaga; Ronnie Magsanoc; Ronnie Magsanoc; Benjie Paras; Alvin Patrimonio; Zaldy Realubit Coach: Robert Jaworski	Pakistan (PAK); W 129-81	1st	North Korea (PRK) W 98–82	2nd	Japan (JPN); W 94–90	China (CHN); L 76-90	2nd place, silver medalist(s)
Allan Caidic; Hector Calma; Rey Cuenco; Yves Dignadice; Ramon Fernandez; Dante Gonzalgo; Samboy Lim; Chito Loyzaga; Ronnie Magsanoc; Ronnie Magsanoc; Benjie Paras; Alvin Patrimonio; Zaldy Realubit Coach: Robert Jaworski	Pakistan (PAK); W 129-81	1st	China (CHN); L 60–125	2nd	Japan (JPN); W 94–90	China (CHN); L 76-90	2nd place, silver medalist(s)
Allan Caidic; Hector Calma; Rey Cuenco; Yves Dignadice; Ramon Fernandez; Dante Gonzalgo; Samboy Lim; Chito Loyzaga; Ronnie Magsanoc; Ronnie Magsanoc; Benjie Paras; Alvin Patrimonio; Zaldy Realubit Coach: Robert Jaworski	Japan (JPN); W 86–78	1st	United Arab Emirates (UAE); W 80–75	2nd	Japan (JPN); W 94–90	China (CHN); L 76-90	2nd place, silver medalist(s)
