= 2022 Philippines Asian Games basketball team =

Philippines Asian Games basketball

- Head coach: Tim Cone
- 2022 Asian Games: Gold
- Scoring leader: (United States) Justin Brownlee 22.1

The 2022 Philippines men's Asian Games basketball team, was a Filipino Asian Games team assembled for the basketball competition on 2022 Asian Games.

The Asian Games was rescheduled by 2023 because of COVID-19 pandemic.

== Forming the team ==
The formation of the team was started after the 2023 FIBA World Cup. Tim Cone (notably coached the 1998 team) was appointed as head coach. The team roster composition have problems, as majority of the players from the World Cup (coached by Chot Reyes) was unable to commit due to their another commitments (mostly due to their B-League teams).

== Roster ==
=== 2022 Asian Games ===
The following was the roster of the Philippines national team for the 2022 Asian Games in China.

Philippines national basketball – 2022 Asian Games roster
Players
Coaches

Pos.	No.	Name	Age – Date of birth	Height	Club	Ctr.
G/F	3	Chris Newsome	33 – July 25, 1990	1.88 m (6 ft 2 in)	Meralco Bolts	(Philippines)
PG	6	Kevin Alas	31 – November 13, 1991	1.83 m (6 ft 0 in)	NLEX Road Warriors	(Philippines)
SG	9	Scottie Thompson	30 – July 12, 1993	1.85 m (6 ft 1 in)	Barangay Ginebra San Miguel	(Philippines)
F	10	Arvin Tolentino	27 – November 5, 1995	1.96 m (6 ft 5 in)	NorthPort Batang Pier	(Philippines)
G	12	Chris Ross	38 – March 9, 1985	1.85 m (6 ft 1 in)	San Miguel Beermen	(Philippines)
G/F	13	Marcio Lassiter	36 – May 16, 1987	1.88 m (6 ft 2 in)	San Miguel Beermen	(Philippines)
C	15	June Mar Fajardo	33 – November 17, 1989	2.08 m (6 ft 10 in)	San Miguel Beermen	(Philippines)
G	17	CJ Perez	29 – November 17, 1993	1.88 m (6 ft 2 in)	San Miguel Beermen	(Philippines)
F	18	Calvin Oftana	27 – January 3, 1996	1.96 m (6 ft 5 in)	TNT Tropang Giga	(Philippines)
F	25	Japeth Aguilar (C)	36 – January 25, 1987	2.06 m (6 ft 9 in)	Barangay Ginebra San Miguel	(Philippines)
F	32	Justin Brownlee (NP)	35 – April 23, 1988	1.98 m (6 ft 6 in)	Barangay Ginebra San Miguel	(Philippines)
C	34	Ange Kouame (NP)	25 – December 15, 1997	2.08 m (6 ft 10 in)	Free agent

Head coach

- (United States) Tim Cone

Assistant coach(es)

- (Philippines) Richard del Rosario
- (Philippines) LA Tenorio
- (Philippines) Jong Uichico
- (Philippines) Josh Reyes

Legend

- (C) Team captain
- (NP) Naturalized player
- Club – describes last
  club before the tournament
- Age – describes age
  on September 26, 2023

== Asian Games competition ==
=== Group phase ===
September 26
13:30 (UTC+8)

Results

Philippines	89–61	Bahrain
Scoring by quarter: 22–18, 29–15, 21–14, 17–14
Pts: Perez, Kouame 15; Rebs: Brownlee 9 Asts: Lassiter 4		Pts: Almoathin 14; Rebs: Chism 13; Asts: Almoathin 3

Hangzhou Olympic Sports Centre Gymnasium, Hangzhou
Referees: Paul Skayem (LBN), Taha Mohammed Nasser Al-Hashedi (YEM), Li Chengxin (CHN)

September 28
17:30 (UTC+8)

Boxscore

Thailand	72–87	Philippines
Scoring by quarter: 22–20, 13–21, 15–27, 22–19
Pts: Lamb 29; Rebs: Jakrawan, Klahan 6 Asts: Lish, J. Morgan 3		Pts: Brownlee 19; Rebs: Brownlee 12; Asts: Thompson 9

Hangzhou Olympic Sports Centre Gymnasium, Hangzhou
Referees: Yuen Chun Yip (HKG), Hu Jing (CHN), Mohammad Rajabiozoodi (IRI)

September 30
11:00 (UTC+8)

Boxscore

Jordan	87–62	Philippines
Scoring by quarter: 16–13, 26–16, 17–23, 28–10
Pts: Hollis-Jefferson 24; Rebs: Bohannon 9 Asts: Hollis-Jefferson 9		Pts: Brownlee 24; Rebs: Thompson 11; Asts: Brownlee, Perez 3

Zhejiang University Zijingang Gymnasium, Hangzhou
Referees: Yuen Chun Yip (HKG), Song Houlu (CHN), Issam Nasser Khalfan Al Siyabi (OMA)

=== Qualification for quarterfinals ===
October 2
16:00 (UTC+8)

Report

Philippines	80–41	Qatar
Scoring by quarter: 33–14, 24–9, 16–7, 7–11
Pts: Fajardo, Perez 12; Rebs: Kouame 10; Asts: Newsome 6		Pts: Muslic 12; Rebs: Ndao 8 Asts: four players 4

Zhejiang University Zijingang Gymnasium, Hangzhou
Referees: Wissam Zein (SYR), Hu Jing (CHN), Taha Al-Hashedi (YEM)

=== Quarterfinal ===
October 3
12:00 (UTC+8)

Boxscore

Iran	83–84	Philippines
Scoring by quarter: 22–28, 14–20, 18–23, 29–13
Pts: Vahedi 24; Rebs: Kazemi 8 Asts: Rezaeifer 7		Pts: Brownlee 36; Rebs: Brownlee, Fajardo 8 Asts: Brownlee, Fajardo 4

Zhejiang University Zijingang Gymnasium, Hangzhou
Referees: Alexey Stepanenko (KAZ), Taha Al-Hashedi (YEM), Ahmad Alyousef (JOR)

=== Semifinal ===
October 4
20:00 (UTC+8)

Boxscore

Philippines	77–76	China
Scoring by quarter: 17–19, 13–29, 20–14, 27–14
Pts: Brownlee 33; Rebs: Thompson 8 Asts: Brownlee, Perez 4		Pts: Zhao R. 18; Rebs: Zhu 8 Asts: Zhao R. 6

Hangzhou Olympic Sports Centre Gymnasium, Hangzhou
Referees: Paul Skayem (LBN), Alexey Stepanenko (KAZ), Wissam Zein (SYR)

=== Gold medal game ===
6 October
20:00 (UTC+8)

Boxscore

Jordan	60–70	Philippines
Scoring by quarter: 12–17, 19–14, 10–20, 19–19
Pts: Hollis-Jefferson 24; Rebs: Al-Dwairi 15; Asts: Hollis-Jefferson, Mustafa 5		Pts: Brownlee 20; Rebs: Kouame 11; Asts: Brownlee 5

Hangzhou Olympic Sports Centre Gymnasium, Hangzhou
Referees: Harja Jaladri (INA), Yuen Chun Yip (HKG), Paul Skayem (LBN)

== Legacy ==
The team won the first gold medal since 1962, first medal since 1998 (also a Cone-coached team who won bronze), and finals appearance since 1990 (Jaworski-coached team who won silver).

The success made Tim Cone to be appointed as head coach of the Philippine national basketball team.
