= June 2004 in sports =

<<	June 2004					>>
Su	Mo	Tu	We	Th	Fr	Sa
		1	2	3	4	5
6	7	8	9	10	11	12
13	14	15	16	17	18	19
20	21	22	23	24	25	26
27	28	29	30
Sports

This list shows notable sports-related deaths, events, and outcomes that occurred in June of 2004.

== Deaths ==
- 27 Darrell Russell
- 17 Gerry McNeil
- 16 Rob Derksen
- 13 Dick Durrance
- 8 Mack Jones

== June 30, 2004 (Wednesday) ==
- Euro 2004: In the first semi-final Portugal beat the Netherlands 2–1. This is the first time Portugal have reached the final of a major football tournament. (BBC)
- Wimbledon quarter-finals:
  - Defending champion Serena Williams defeats fellow American Jennifer Capriati, 6–1, 6–1. (ESPN)
  - Fourth seed Amélie Mauresmo (France) defeats Paola Suárez (Argentina) 6–0 5–7 6–1. (Reuters)
  - Unseeded Croatian Mario Ančić beats the fifth seed, Britain's Tim Henman, 7–6 (7–5) 6–4 6–2. (BBC)
  - Second seed Andy Roddick (USA) beats Sjeng Schalken (Netherlands) 7–6 (7–4) 7–6 (11–9) 6–3. (BBC)
  - Defending champion Roger Federer (Switzerland) beats Lleyton Hewitt (Australia) 6–1 6–7 (1–7) 6–0 6–4. (BBC)
  - Tenth seed Sébastien Grosjean (France) defeats Florian Mayer (Germany) 7–5 6–4 6–2. (BBC)
- IRL: Two-time Indianapolis 500 winner Al Unser Jr. announces his retirement from racing after over twenty years racing in CART and the IRL. (ESPN)
- NASCAR: Tony Stewart was fined US $50,000 by NASCAR for an altercation with Brian Vickers following Sunday's Dodge/Save Mart 350. He was also docked 25 championship points, dropping him to sixth in the Nextel Cup Championship points race. NASCAR stopped short of suspending Stewart for a race, which would likely have eliminated him from the points race altogether. (ESPN)
- MLB: Colorado Rockies hitter Larry Walker gets his 2,000th hit in a 5–4 loss against the Milwaukee Brewers. Walker is the 234th player to reach the milestone. (ESPN)

== June 29, 2004 (Tuesday) ==
- Wimbledon quarter-finals:
  - Fifth seed Lindsay Davenport (USA) beats unseeded Karolina Šprem (Croatia) 6–2 6–2. (BBC)
  - Maria Sharapova (Russia), seeded 13, beats Ai Sugayama (Japan), seeded 11, 5–7 7–5 6–1. (BBC)
- Wimbledon: Tim Henman advances into the quarter-finals with a win over Australian Mark Philippoussis, last year's runner-up, 6–2 7–5 6–7(3) 7–6(5). (TennisX)
- NBA: The Orlando Magic trade star Tracy McGrady to the Houston Rockets along with Cuttino Mobley and Kelvin Cato for Steve Francis, Juwan Howard, Tyronn Lue and Reece Gaines. (ESPN)
- MLB: Arizona Diamondbacks pitcher Randy Johnson throws his 4,000th strikeout, joining Nolan Ryan, Roger Clemens and Steve Carlton at that milestone. (ESPN)

== June 28, 2004 (Monday) ==
- Pakistan's top amateur boxing prospect, Maurin Karim, is banned from the Olympic Games for testing positive for a banned substance during a previous competition.

== June 27, 2004 (Sunday) ==
- Cricket: West Indies defeat England by 7 wickets in a One Day International at Trent Bridge, Nottingham
- Euro 2004: In the last quarter-final, the Czech Republic defeats Denmark 3–0. The Czechs blew open a game which had been scoreless at halftime with a goal by Jan Koller and two by Milan Baroš. (BBC)
- College World Series: Cal State Fullerton wins the NCAA baseball College World Series, defeating Texas 3–2 to win the best-of-three championship series 2–0. (ESPN)
- Arena Football League: The San Jose SaberCats defeat the Arizona Rattlers, 69–62, to win ArenaBowl XVIII. (ESPN)
- NASCAR: Jeff Gordon wins the Dodge/Save Mart 350 at Infineon Raceway. (ESPN)
- PGA Tour: Australian Adam Scott wins the Booz Allen Classic at TPC at Avenel, shooting a final round 68 to finish at 21-under par for the tournament. (ESPN)
- Golf: Ya-Ni Tseng of Chinese Taipei (Taiwan) came back from four holes down to upset defending champion Michelle Wie at the U.S. Women's Amateur Public Links. (ESPN)
- United States Gymnastics Olympic trials: Courtney Kupets and Courtney McCool finish the competition in first and second place, respectively. Other top-ten finishers include Carly Patterson (#3), Tasha Schwiker (#7) and Carly Janiga (#9).(ESPN)
- Baseball: Carlos Peña hits a grand slam home run with two outs and two strikes in the bottom of the ninth inning, as the Detroit Tigers defeat the Arizona Diamondbacks, 9 to 5.(ESPN)
- Drag racing: NHRA driver Darrell Russell dies of injuries sustained during an accident at the Sears Craftsman Nationals at Madison, Illinois. (ESPN)
- Wimbledon: On People's Sunday, Englishman Tim Henman advances to the third round by defeating Hicham Arazi 7–6 (6), 6–4, 3–6, 6–2. Amongst the others advancing are Andy Roddick, Jennifer Capriati, defending women's champion Serena Williams and defending men's champion Roger Federer.(AP via Yahoo! news)
- United States Gymnastics Olympic trials: Courtney Kupets and Courtney McCool finish the competition in first and second place, respectively. Other top-ten finishers include Carly Patterson (#3), Tasha Schwiker (#7) and Carly Janiga (#9). (ESPN)
- Baseball: Carlos Peña hits a grand slam home run with two outs and two strikes in the bottom of the ninth inning, as the Detroit Tigers defeat the Arizona Diamondbacks, 9 to 5. (ESPN)

== June 26, 2004 (Saturday) ==
- Rugby union:
  - Australia defeat England 51–15 at Lang Park in Brisbane. (BBC)
  - New Zealand defeat Argentina 41–7 at Waikato Stadium in Hamilton. (BBC)
  - South Africa defeat Wales 53–18 at Loftus Versfeld Stadium in Pretoria. (BBC)
- Euro 2004: In the third quarter-final, the Netherlands beat Sweden 5–4 on penalties. The match ended 0–0 after extra time. (BBC)
- NHL Draft: With the first pick in the 2004 NHL draft, the Washington Capitals select Alexander Ovechkin from Russia, the second Russian to go first in the draft in NHL history. (Ilya Kovalchuk of the Atlanta Thrashers was drafted first in 2001.) Yevgeny Malkin was selected second by the Pittsburgh Penguins and Cam Barker from Canada was selected third by the Chicago Blackhawks. (ESPN)
- Wimbledon: Rain washed out play for the second day in a week. For only the third time in Wimbledon's history, matches will be played on Sunday to try to catch up. (BBC)
- College World Series: Cal State, Fullerton defeats Texas, 6–4, in the first game of the best of three championship series. (ESPN)
- IRL: Dan Wheldon wins the SunTrust Indy Challenge at Richmond International Raceway. (ESPN)

== June 25, 2004 (Friday) ==
- NBA: Colorado District Judge Terry Ruckriegle set the starting date of the sexual assault trial of NBA star Kobe Bryant for August 27. On that date, prospective jurors will be questioned. The trial, to be held in Eagle, Colorado, is expected to last three to four weeks. (ESPN)
- Euro 2004: In the second quarter-final, unfancied Greece surprisingly beat strong favourites France 1–0. Until this tournament Greece had never won a match in European Championships or World Cup finals tournaments. (BBC)
- Wimbledon: Second seed and French Open champion Anastasia Myskina is upset by American Amy Frazier in the second round, 4–6, 6–4, 6–4. (ESPN)

== June 24, 2004 (Thursday) ==
- Euro 2004: In the first quarter-final, Portugal beat England 6–5 on penalties after the two teams drew 2–2 after extra time. The referee Urs Meier controversially disallowed a goal by England in the last minute of normal time. (BBC)
- NBA draft: Dwight Howard from Southwest Atlanta Christian Academy is selected in the first pick of the draft by the Orlando Magic. Emeka Okafor of the University of Connecticut is selected by the Charlotte Bobcats with the second pick. Ben Gordon, also from Connecticut, is selected third by the Chicago Bulls. Shaun Livingston from Peoria Central High School is selected fourth by the Los Angeles Clippers. Devin Harris from the University of Wisconsin was selected fifth by the Washington Wizards, but is, in actuality, part of the trade made Wednesday with the Dallas Mavericks.
- Wimbledon: Third seed Venus Williams is upset in the second round of play by Karolina Šprem, 7–6 (5), 7–6 (6). The match was marred by a chair umpire's scoring error in the second-set tiebreaker that incorrectly gave Šprem a point. (ESPN)
- MLB: Kansas City Royals star Carlos Beltrán is traded to the Houston Astros in a three-team deal. The Oakland Athletics receive reliever Octavio Dotel from Houston and the Royals receive some prospects from both teams. (ESPN)
- Barry Bonds lashes out in public at sprinter Tim Montgomery, after Montgomery accused him the week before of being involved with the BALCO steroids company.AOL
- NHL: Vancouver Canucks star Todd Bertuzzi was formally charged with assault by Vancouver police after a four-month investigation stemming from a March 8 hit on the Colorado Avalanche's Steve Moore that left him with three fractured vertebrae, post-concussion symptoms and amnesia. Bertuzzi had been previously suspended without pay by the NHL for the final 13 games of the past season and the entire playoffs for the incident. (ESPN)
- College World Series: Cal State, Fullerton advances to the College World Series finals, defeating South Carolina, 4–0. (ESPN)

== June 23, 2004 (Wednesday) ==
- Euro 2004: Group D – In the final group matches, Czech Republic, which had already qualified for the quarter-finals as group winners, beat Germany 2–1, and Netherlands beat Latvia 3–0. The Netherlands qualifies for the quarter-finals as group runners-up. (BBC) (BBC)
- College World Series:
  - Texas eliminates Georgia from competition, 7–6, and secures itself a place in the College World Series finals.
  - South Carolina defeated Cal State Fullerton 5–3 to force a rematch between the two teams on Thursday to determine which team will play in the College World Series finals.
- Wimbledon: The matches are suspended due to rain.
- NBA: The Dallas Mavericks trade Antawn Jamison, the 2003–2004 NBA Sixth Man of the Year Award winner, to the Washington Wizards for Jerry Stackhouse, Christian Laettner and the Wizards' first-round draft pick (fifth pick overall). It is thought that the Mavericks, who have reportedly been attempting to establish a trade with the Los Angeles Lakers for star center Shaquille O'Neal, made the trade as a possible means to sweeten any potential trade with the Lakers. The trade was officially consummated at the NBA draft the next day. (ESPN)

== June 22, 2004 (Tuesday) ==
- Euro 2004: Group C – In the final group matches, Italy beat Bulgaria 2–1, and Sweden and Denmark draw 2–2. Sweden qualify for the quarter-finals as group winners; Denmark as group runners-up. (BBC) (BBC)
- NBA: The expansion Charlotte Bobcats made their selections in the NBA expansion draft. While the Bobcats selected 19 players, many are restricted free agents and are expected to be used as bargaining chips in trades with other teams. Among those drafted include Marcus Fizer of the Chicago Bulls, Jahidi White of the Phoenix Suns, Gerald Wallace of the Sacramento Kings and Jason Kapono of the Cleveland Cavaliers. (ESPN)
- NBA: ESPN reports indicate that the Orlando Magic have traded disgruntled star Tracy McGrady to the Houston Rockets along with Juwan Howard, Tyronn Lue and Reece Gaines for the Rockets' Steve Francis, Cuttino Mobley and Kelvin Cato. The trade has not yet been completely finalized because Francis cannot be officially traded until July 1 due to salary cap restrictions. (ESPN)
- WNBA: Lisa Leslie of the Los Angeles Sparks has her second dunk shot as a professional player as the Sparks beat the New York Liberty, 65–49. Leslie's two dunks are the only two dunks in WNBA history (WNBA)
- College World Series:
  - Georgia eliminates Arizona from competition with a 3–1 victory.
  - South Carolina eliminates Miami from competition with a 15–11 win.

== June 21, 2004 (Monday) ==
- Wimbledon: Martina Navratilova defeated Colombian Catalina Castaño, 6–0, 6–1 in the first round match at Wimbledon. Navratilova, 47, became the oldest player to win a singles match since the Open Era began in 1968. (ESPN)
- Euro 2004: Group B – In the final group matches, France beat Switzerland 3–1, and England beat Croatia 4–2. France qualify for the quarter-finals as group winners; England as group runners-up. (BBC) (BBC)
- College World Series:
  - South Carolina eliminates LSU from competition with a 15–4 win.
  - Cal State, Fullerton defeats Miami, 6–3.

== June 20, 2004 (Sunday) ==
- Euro 2004: Group A – In the final group matches, Russia beat Greece 2–1, and Portugal beat Spain 1–0. Portugal qualify for the quarter-finals as group winners; Greece as group runners-up. (BBC) (BBC)
- U.S. Open: Retief Goosen holds on to win his second U.S. Open (4-under par) in a round that saw no golfer shoot better than even par. Phil Mickelson was the runner-up at 2-under par. Jeff Maggert finished third, Mike Weir and Shigeki Maruyama tied for fourth. (ESPN)
- MLB: Ken Griffey Jr. becomes the 20th player to hit his 500th career home run, connecting off the St. Louis Cardinals' Matt Morris in the sixth inning of a 6–0 Cincinnati Reds win. (ESPN)
- NASCAR: Ryan Newman wins the DHL 400 at Michigan International Speedway. (ESPN)
- Formula One: Michael Schumacher wins the United States Grand Prix at the Indianapolis Motor Speedway. (ESPN)
- Champ Car: Sébastien Bourdais wins the Grand Prix of Portland.
- LPGA: Cristie Kerr wins the ShopRite LPGA Classic with a 3-under 68, defeating 17-year-old Paula Creamer by one stroke. (ESPN)
- College World Series:
  - Arizona eliminates Arkansas from competition with a 7–2 win.
  - Texas defeats Georgia, 9–3.

== June 19, 2004 (Saturday) ==
- Euro 2004: Group D – The Czech Republic comes back from a 2–0 deficit to defeat Netherlands 3–2. This result, combined with the Latvia-Germany draw earlier that day, clinched the top spot in Group D for the Czechs, and makes the Czechs the first squad to qualify for the quarter-finals. (BBC)
- Euro 2004: Group D – Latvia and Germany draw 0–0. (BBC)
- U.S. Open: Playing in stiff winds, South African Retief Goosen takes a two-shot lead (at 5-under par) at the U.S. Open after shooting a 1-under 69. Ernie Els and Phil Mickelson are tied for second at three-under par and Fred Funk and Shigeki Maruyama are tied for fourth at two-under par. (ESPN)
- Rugby union: New Zealand defeat England 36–12 in the second test, at Eden Park in Auckland. (RugbyRugby.com)
- Rugby union: South Africa defeat Ireland 26–17 in the second test, at Newlands in Cape Town. (RugbyRugby.com)
- Rugby union: Wales defeat Argentina 35–15 in the second test, in Buenos Aires. (RugbyRugby.com)
- Rugby union: Australia defeat Scotland 34–13 in the second test, at Stadium Australia in Sydney. (RugbyRugby.com)
- MLB: Cleveland Indians pitcher Cliff Lee is suspended for six games by Major League Baseball for intentionally throwing at Ken Griffey Jr.'s head in a game on June 13. (ESPN)
- College World Series:
  - Cal State, Fullerton defeats South Carolina, 2–0.
  - Miami defeats LSU, 9–5.
- Boxing: Marco Antonio Barrera defeats Paulie Ayala by a tenth-round knockout in a Los Angeles bout highly anticipated by Mexicans and Mexican-Americans.
- Wimbledon: Argentinian David Nalbandian withdrew from Wimbledon with a torn abdominal muscle. (ESPN)

== June 18, 2004 (Friday) ==
- Euro 2004: Group C – Italy and Sweden draw 1–1. (BBC)
- Euro 2004: Group C – Denmark beat Bulgaria 2–0. Bulgaria can no longer qualify for the knockout stage of the competition. (BBC)
- U.S. Open: After the second day of golf, Masters champion Phil Mickelson and Shigeki Maruyama share the lead at 6-under par at the U.S. Open. Jeff Maggert is in third place at 5-under par. Other notables include Ernie Els at −3, Vijay Singh at −2, Sergio García at even par and Tiger Woods at +1. The previous round's leader, Jay Haas shot a 4-over par on the day to finish the day at even par. (ESPN)
- NBA: Phil Jackson and the Los Angeles Lakers have announced, by mutual decision, that Jackson will not return to the Lakers for the next season. Jackson, the winningest coach in NBA history, had previously indicated that his return to the Lakers for a sixth season was unlikely. (ESPN)
- College World Series:
  - Georgia defeats Arizona, 8–7.
  - Texas defeats Arkansas, 13–2.

== June 17, 2004 (Thursday) ==
- Euro 2004: Group B – Croatia and France draw 2–2. (BBC)
- Euro 2004: Group B – England beat Switzerland 3–0. Wayne Rooney scores twice, becoming the youngest scorer in the history of these championships. (BBC)
- Euro 2004: Italy's Francesco Totti is banned by UEFA for three matches for "gross sporting misconduct", effective immediately, after spitting at Christian Poulsen of Denmark during their match earlier this week. (BBC)
- U.S. Open: After the first day of play, veteran Jay Haas and Shigeki Maruyama of Japan both shot a 4-under par 66 to take an early lead before afternoon rounds were suspended because of the threat of thunderstorms. Ángel Cabrera was also at 4-under par after 12 holes before play was suspended for the day. Sergio García, Tom Kite and Tiger Woods all shot 2-over par 72s. David Duval, who has been absent from the Tour for several months, shot a 13-over par 83. (ESPN)

== June 16, 2004 (Wednesday) ==
- Euro 2004: Group A – Portugal beat Russia 2–0. Russia can no longer qualify for the knock-out stage of the competition. (BBC)
- Euro 2004: Group A – Greece and Spain draw 1–1. (BBC)
- Wimbledon: The All England Club announces the seedings for the Wimbledon Championships. The number one seed on the women's side is Serena Williams, followed by Anastasia Myskina, Venus Williams, Amélie Mauresmo and Lindsay Davenport. On the men's side, defending champion Roger Federer is the top seed, followed by Andy Roddick, Guillermo Coria, David Nalbandian and Tim Henman. (ESPN)
- NASCAR: Matt Kenseth and Kevin Harvick were both fined US $25,000 and placed on probation for intentionally spinning each other out at the end of last Sunday's Pocono 500 under caution. This is in addition to the two being docked ten positions in the field for the incident immediately following the race. (ESPN)

== June 15, 2004 (Tuesday) ==
- NBA Finals: The Detroit Pistons defeat the Los Angeles Lakers, 100–87, in Game 5 of the NBA Finals to win the series and upset the heavily favored Lakers in front of a home crowd in Auburn Hills, Michigan. Chauncey Billups was named the NBA Finals MVP.
- NBA: Following Game 5 of the NBA Finals, Los Angeles Lakers head coach Phil Jackson says there is a "slim chance" he will return to coach the Lakers next year. (ESPN)
- Euro 2004: Group D – Germany and the Netherlands draw 1–1. (BBC)
- Euro 2004: Group D – The Czech Republic beat Latvia 2–1. (ESPN)
- Tennis: Andre Agassi withdraws from Wimbledon due to a hip injury, leaving the tournament without one of the world's top tennis players. (ESPN)

== June 14, 2004 (Monday) ==
- Euro 2004: Group C – Sweden beat Bulgaria 5–0, including two goals in consecutive minutes from Henrik Larsson. (BBC)
- Euro 2004: Group C – Denmark and Italy draw 0–0. (BBC)
- Horse racing: Danestorm wins the A$500,000 Conrad Treasury Brisbane Cup to give Kiwi jockey Michael Walker his first Group 1 win in Australia. An outstanding champion apprentice jockey in New Zealand, Walker has only recently moved to Australia.
- Major League Baseball: Philadelphia Phillies first baseman Jim Thome hits his 400th career home run, putting him at 37th on the all-time list ahead of Al Kaline. (ESPN)
- NBA: Police in Michigan announce that Karl Malone of the Los Angeles Lakers will not be charged for touching a Pistons fan on the nose before game four of the NBA Finals. (ESPN)
- Boxing – The WBC, one of boxing's four leading world championship organizations, closes its offices in Mexico City, Mexico.

== June 13, 2004 (Sunday) ==
- Euro 2004: Group B – France beat England 2–1 with two late goals from Zinedine Zidane, having been 1–0 down until stoppage time. (BBC)
- Euro 2004: Group B – Switzerland and Croatia draw 0–0. (BBC)
- NBA Finals: The Detroit Pistons defeat the Los Angeles Lakers, 88–80, in Game 4 of the NBA Finals to take a 3–1 series lead. No team has ever rebounded from a 3–1 deficit in the NBA Finals.
- Test cricket: England beat New Zealand by four wickets at Trent Bridge to win the test series 3–0. England's Graham Thorpe hits his 14th Test century, finishing on 104 not out. (BBC)
- Association football: Pumas UNAM beat Guadalajara, 0–0 (5–4 on penalties) to win Mexico's league championship.
- NASCAR: Jimmie Johnson wins the Pocono 500.
- Formula One: Michael Schumacher wins the Canadian Grand Prix.
- 24 Hours of Le Mans: Tom Kristensen (Denmark), Seiji Ara (Japan) and Rinaldo Capello (Italy) won the 24-hour Le Mans race with a record 379 laps in 24 hours.
- PGA Tour: Sergio García wins the Buick Open.
- LPGA: Annika Sörenstam wins the LPGA Championship, her seventh major title.
- Rugby union: Australia defeat Scotland 35–15 in the first test, at the Docklands Stadium in Melbourne.
- Arena Football League: The Arizona Rattlers defeat the Colorado Crush, 45–41, to earn a berth in ArenaBowl XVIII.
- Boxing: Azumah Nelson, Carlos Palomino, Dwight Muhammad Qawi and Daniel Zaragoza, among others, are inducted into the International Boxing Hall of Fame.

== June 12, 2004 (Saturday) ==
- Euro 2004: Group A – Spain beat Russia 1–0. (BBC)
- Euro 2004: Group A – Greece beat hosts Portugal 2–1 in a surprise result in the competition's opening match. (BBC)
- NFL Europe: The Berlin Thunder defeat the Frankfurt Galaxy, 30–24 in World Bowl XII.
- Rugby union: In their first game under new coach Graham Henry and new captain Tana Umaga, New Zealand defeat England 36–3 in the first test at Carisbrook in Dunedin.
- Rugby union: South Africa defeat Ireland 37–17 in the first test at Free State Stadium in Bloemfontein.
- Rugby union: Argentina defeat Wales 50–44 in the first test in Tucumán.
- IRL: Tony Kanaan wins the Bombardier 500 at Texas Motor Speedway.
- Arena Football League: The San Jose SaberCats defeat the Chicago Rush, 49–35, to earn a berth in ArenaBowl XVIII.
- Boxing: Two division world champion Floyd Mayweather Jr. gets charged with two misdemeanor counts, stemming from two fights with women, in Las Vegas, Nevada. (ESPN)

== June 10, 2004 (Thursday) ==
- NBA Finals: The Detroit Pistons hold the Los Angeles Lakers to their lowest point total ever in the NBA Finals, 88–68, and take a 2–1 series lead.
- NHL Awards:
  - Martin St. Louis (Tampa Bay Lightning) – Hart Memorial Trophy (League MVP)
  - Martin Brodeur (New Jersey Devils) – Vezina Trophy (Best Goaltender)
  - Scott Niedermayer (New Jersey Devils) – James Norris Memorial Trophy (Best Defenseman)
  - Andrew Raycroft (Boston Bruins) – Calder Memorial Trophy (Best Rookie)
  - Kris Draper (Detroit Red Wings) – Frank J. Selke Trophy (Best Defensive Forward)
  - Brad Richards (Tampa Bay Lightning) – Lady Byng Memorial Trophy (Most Gentlemanly)
  - John Tortorella (Tampa Bay Lightning) – Jack Adams Award (Best Coach)
  - Jarome Iginla (Calgary Flames) – King Clancy Memorial Trophy (Humanitarian Contribution to Hockey)
  - Bryan Berard (Chicago Blackhawks) – Bill Masterton Memorial Trophy (Perseverance, Sportsmanship and Dedication to Hockey)

== June 9, 2004 (Wednesday) ==
- National Hockey League: Four new members of the Hockey Hall of Fame are announced: the all-time leading goal and point scorer among defensemen, Ray Bourque, the second-leading goal scorer among defensemen, Paul Coffey, the second-leading point scorer among defensemen Larry Murphy, and Cliff Fletcher, former general manager of the Calgary Flames and Toronto Maple Leafs. The induction ceremony was held on November 8 in Toronto, Ontario.

== June 8, 2004 (Tuesday) ==
- NBA Finals: The Los Angeles Lakers defeat the Detroit Pistons in overtime of Game 2 of the NBA Finals, 99–91. The game was sent into overtime by Kobe Bryant, who hit a critical 3-point shot with less than three seconds remaining in regulation.
- NBA: Larry Bird, while commenting on the NBA's current status on an ESPN show hosted by Jim Gray, calls the NBA, "a black man's game" and says that he would like to see more white superstars in the NBA. (AOL Sports)
- NCAA Basketball: Ohio State University head coach Jim O'Brien was fired by the school after admitting that he gave a recruit US $6,000 five years ago, in violation of NCAA recruiting rules. The NCAA said they are currently investigating O'Brien and the school regarding the violation. (SI)

== June 7, 2004 (Monday) ==
- NHL Stanley Cup Finals: The Tampa Bay Lightning defeat the Calgary Flames in Game 7, 2–1 to win the Stanley Cup. The Lightning's Brad Richards wins the Conn Smythe Trophy as MVP of the Stanley Cup playoffs.
- MLB: The San Diego Padres select local high school shortstop Matt Bush with the number 1 pick in the Amateur Draft.
