= Nandasena Perera =

Sri Lankan golfer (1954–2019)

Personal information
- Full name: K Nandasena Perera
- Nationality: Sri Lanka
- Born: 29 August 1954 Rajagiriya, Sri Lanka
- Died: 14 February 2019 (aged 64) Colombo, Sri Lanka
- Height: 5 ft 3 in (160 cm)

Career
- Sport: Golf
- Turned professional: c. 1990
- Former tours: Asia Golf Circuit; Asian Tour; Japan Golf Tour
- Professional wins: 8
Medal record
Asian Games
| Silver medal – second place | 1990 Beijing | Individual |

K Nandasena Perera (29 August 1954 – 14 February 2019) was a Sri Lankan professional golfer.

== Early life ==
Perera grew up in Colombo, Sri Lanka. Perera left school early to work for his family. He later got into golf while working as a caddy at the Royal Colombo Golf Club. At the age of 15, Perera broke his left arm at the elbow. Te elbow was set incorrectly, prohibiting the full extension of his left hand. Despite this he went on to be a professional golfer.

== Amateur career ==
Perera won the Sri Lanka Amateur Championship several times. He also won the national amateur championship of Pakistan, Thailand, Singapore, and Malaysia.

Perea had some other highlights during this era. He shot a 63 (−8) at the Royal Colombo Golf Course Open in 1983, breaking the course record. He would go on to win the event. Very shortly afterwards he played in the Singapore Open. In the second round he made a hole-in-one winning a free Mercedes-Benz E320.

== Professional career ==
Perera turned professional around the year 1990. He competed at the 1990 Asian Games in Beijing, China. Perera was in the finals against Japan's Shigeki Maruyama. The two were tied after regulation and competed in a sudden-death playoff to determine who got the gold medal. Maruyama hit his drive into the rough and could not find his ball after three minutes of searching. If two more minutes elapsed then he would have to take a penalty stroke. However, Perera found the ball and notified his competitor. Maruyama went on to defeat Perera on that hole. Perera, however, won a Silver Medal and was remembered for his act of sportsmanship.

In 1991, Perera played excellently at several international tournaments. He won the 1991 Sabah Masters, an event played in Indonesia. A couple months later, in October 1991, he finished runner-up at the Malaysian Masters to Australian Stewart Ginn. His best play that year, however, may have been at that November's Air New Zealand Shell Open. Ten behind entering Sunday, Perera shot a final round 66 (−4) in "wet, windy conditions" to "surge through the pack" and finish solo second. The following year, Perera also recorded a number of top ten finishes on the international circuit. The best finish was a joint runner-up placing at the Benson & Hedges Malaysian Open to Vijay Singh.

Perera soon qualified for the Japan Golf Tour and Asian Tour. However, the colder conditions in Japan affected him and he developed severe arthritis. This led to end of his career as a touring professional.

The Indian golfer Rishi Narain noted that Perera was probably the best South Asian golfer of his era.

== Personal life ==
Perera was married to Ranjani. He had three children: a daughter, Nithini, who is a doctor in India; a son, Mithun, who is a professional golfer; and another daughter, Michiko, an archaeology student at University of Colombo. Mithum has won seven events on the Professional Golf Tour of India and has recorded three runner-up finishes on the Asian Tour.

Late in the life, Perera was granted a plot of land adjacent to Royal Colombo Golf Course. He built a house there with the help of several members of the club.

Perera died in early 2019. Late in the year, his son Mithun won an event on the Professional Golf Tour of India and dedicated the win to his father.

== Amateur wins ==
- 1983 Royal Colombo Golf Course Open
- 1988 Sri Lanka National Amateur Golf Championship, Amateur Golf Championship of India Singapore Open Amateur Championship
- 1989 Sri Lanka National Amateur Golf Championship, All India Amateur Golf Championship
- 1990 Sri Lanka National Amateur Golf Championship, All India Amateur Golf Championship, Singapore Open Amateur Championship
- Pakistan Amateur Golf Championship
- Thailand Amateur Golf Championship
- Malaysia Amateur Golf Championship

== Professional wins ==
- 1991 Sabah Masters
- Sri Lankan National Open (7 times)

== Team appearances ==
- Asian Games (representing Sri Lanka): 1990 (individual silver medal)
- World Cup of Golf (representing Sri Lanka): 1996
