= 1998 Alaska Milkmen season =

- Head coach: Tim Cone
- General Manager: Joaqui Trillo
- Owner(s): Wilfred Steven Uytengsu

All-Filipino Cup results
- Record: 19–10 (65.5%)
- Place: 1st
- Playoff finish: Champions (def. San Miguel 4–3)

Commissioner's Cup results
- Record: 16–6 (72.7%)
- Place: 1st
- Playoff finish: Champions (def. San Miguel 4-2)

Governors Cup results
- Record: 6–9 (40%)
- Place: 7th
- Playoff finish: Eliminated

Alaska Milkmen seasons

The 1998 Alaska Milkmen season was the 13th season of the franchise in the Philippine Basketball Association (PBA).

== Draft picks ==
Round	Pick	Player	College
2	12	Stephen Antonio	Arizona State
3		Patrick Benedicto	Mapua Tech

== Two championships ==
Alaska won two titles in the year and on a quest for another Grandslam. In the All-Filipino Cup, the Milkmen won their first five games of the season. They ended up with the best record in the elimination round with nine wins and two losses. In the semifinals, the San Miguel Beermen overtake Alaska and took the first finals seat. The Milkmen had to beat Sta.Lucia Realtors, 77–69, in their playoff game on April 21 for the right to face San Miguel in the finals. The best-of-seven title series features a duel of two American coaches; Tim Cone and Ron Jacobs. Alaska prevailed over San Miguel in seven games to repeat as champions and regain the All-Filipino crown.

Sean Chambers led Alaska to three straight wins in the Commissioners Cup. Their third victory was a come-from-behind 79–78 win over Pop Cola on May 31 as they await the arrival of their import choice Devin Davis. On June 2, Davis scored 24 points in his first game as Alaska defeated Ginebra, 89–80. The Milkmen were unbeaten in eight starts before losing back-to-back games to Mobiline and San Miguel. Alaska advances outright in the best-of-five semifinals and they battled Formula Shell and won the series, three games to two, to reach the finals for the 12th time in the last 13 conferences.

In the championship rematch against San Miguel Beermen, the Milkmen took a commanding 2–0 lead and while the Beermen fought back to tie the series, the Milkmen came through with convincing victories in the last two games to clinch their 9th PBA title as they now tied the defunct Toyota ballclub as the third winningest team in the league.

== Occurrences ==
Coach Tim Cone, who was task to handle the Philippine Centennial Team in the Asian Games, will not be on the Alaska bench along with national team players Johnny Abarrientos, Jojo Lastimosa and Kenneth Duremdes starting the special conference called Centennial Cup. Alaska players Gilbert Reyes and Richard Bachmann were assigned as interim coaches and to make up for the loss of key players, the Milkmen signed two returning cagers and they were Joey Loyzaga and Joseph Valdez.

== Awards ==
- Kenneth Duremdes won the season's Most Valuable Player (MVP) trophy.
- MVP winner Kenneth Duremdes along with Johnny Abarrientos and Jojo Lastimosa were named in the Mythical first team.
- Devin Davis was voted the Commissioner's Cup Best Import.

== Roster ==
1998 Alaska Milkmen roster
Players

Pos.	#	POB	Name	Height	Weight	DOB (YYYY–MM–DD)	From
F	4	(Philippines)	Braulio Lim	6 ft 3 in (1.91 m)			UE
G	5	(Philippines)	Gilbert Reyes	5 ft 8 in (1.73 m)			Ateneo
G/F	6	(Philippines)	Jojo Lastimosa	6 ft 1 in (1.85 m)			USJ–R
G	7	(Philippines)	Roehl Gomez	6 ft 0 in (1.83 m)			Cebu
G/F	9	(Philippines)	Rodney Santos	6 ft 2 in (1.88 m)			San Sebastian
C	12	(Philippines)	Dickie Bachmann	6 ft 5 in (1.96 m)			De La Salle
G	14	(Philippines)	Johnny Abarrientos	5 ft 8 in (1.73 m)			Far Eastern
F	15	(Philippines)	Albert David	6 ft 2 in (1.88 m)			Letran
F	16	(Philippines)	Bong Hawkins	6 ft 3 in (1.91 m)			UPHSD
C	17	(Philippines)	Kevin Ramas	6 ft 4 in (1.93 m)			Mapúa
F	19	(Philippines)	Kenneth Duremdes	6 ft 3 in (1.91 m)			Adamson
C	32	(Philippines)	Poch Juinio	6 ft 5 in (1.96 m)			Philippines
G	41	(Philippines)	Joey Loyzaga	6 ft 0 in (1.83 m)			San Beda
F/C	91	(Philippines)	Joseph Valdez	6 ft 0 in (1.83 m)

Coaches

Head coach

- (United States) Tim Cone

Assistant coach(es)

- (Philippines) Richard Bachmann
- (Philippines) Gilbert Reyes

Team manager

- (Philippines) Joaquin Trillo

Legend

- (C) Team captain
- Injured

== Transactions ==
=== Additions ===
Player	Signed	Former team
Braulio Lim	Off-season	N/A
Joseph Valdez	Governors' Cup	Presto (1992)
Joey Loyzaga	Governors' Cup	Tondeña 65 (1994)

=== Subtractions ===
Player	Signed	New team
Merwin Castelo	Off-season	Mobiline Phone Pals

=== Recruited imports ===
Tournament	Name	Number	Position	University/College	Duration
Commissioner's Cup	Devin Davis	42	Center	Miami (Ohio)	June 2 to August 14
Commissioner's Cup; Governors' Cup	Sean Chambers	20	Forward	Cal Poly San Luis Obispo	May 23–31; August 30-November 6
Governors' Cup	Monty Buckley	3	Forward	UC Berkeley	August 30 to November 6
