= Tim Cone =

American Philippine professional basketball coach

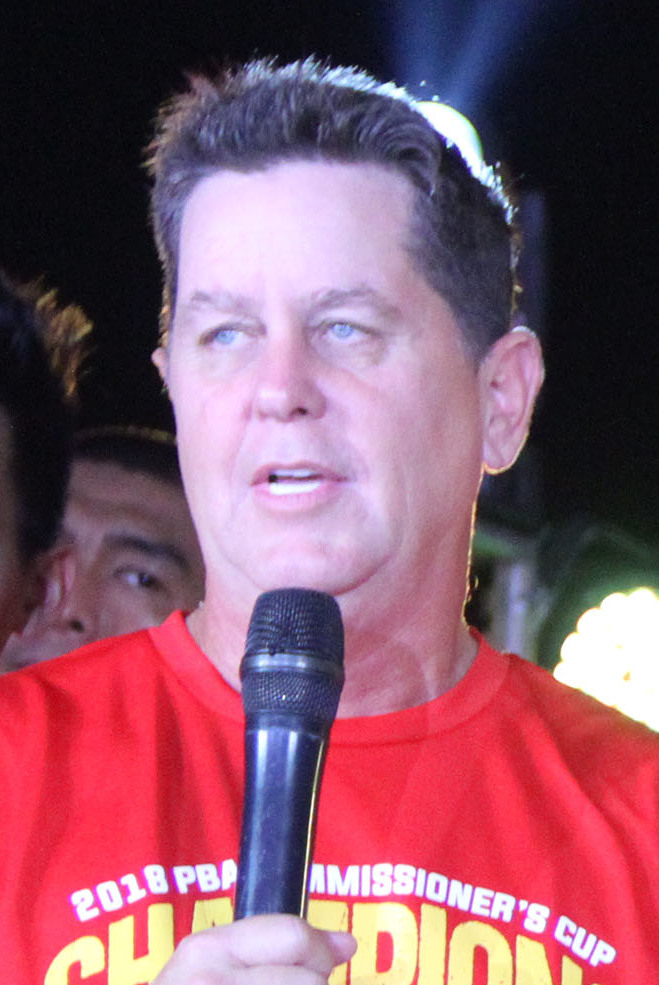
- Cone in 2018

Barangay Ginebra San Miguel
- Position: Head coach
- League: PBA

Personal information
- Born: December 14, 1957 (age 68) Oregon, U.S.

Career information
- High school: International School Manila
- College: Menlo College; George Washington University
- Coaching career: 1989–present

Career history

Coaching
- 1989–2011: Alaska Milkmen/Alaska Aces
- 1998, 2019, 2023–present: Philippines
- 2011–2015: B-Meg Llamados/San Mig Coffee Mixers/San Mig Super Coffee Mixers/Star Hotshots
- 2015–present: Barangay Ginebra San Miguel

Career highlights
- 26× PBA champion (1991 Third Conference, 1994 Governors', 1995 Governors', 1996 All-Filipino, 1996 Commissioner's, 1996 Governors', 1997 Governors' 1998 All-Filipino, 1998 Commissioner's, 2000 All-Filipino, 2003 Invitational, 2007 Fiesta, 2010 Fiesta, 2012 Commissioner's, 2013 Governors', 2014 Philippine, 2014 Commissioner's, 2014 Governors', 2016 Governors', 2017 Governors', 2018 Commissioner's, 2019 Governors', 2020 Philippine, 2021 Governors', 2022–23 Commissioner's, 2026 Commissioner's); 2× Grand Slam champion (1996, 2014); 5× PBA Coach of the Year (1994, 1996, 2014, 2020, 2023); 10× PBA All-Star Game head coach (1992, 1994, 1999, 2007, 2009, 2010, 2014, 2017, 2023, 2024)
Medals
Men's basketball
Head coach for Philippines
Asian Games
Bronze medal – third place	1998 Bangkok	Team
Gold medal – first place	2022 Hangzhou	Team
SEA Games
Gold medal – first place	2019 Philippines	Team
William Jones Cup
Gold medal – first place	1998 Taipei	Team
Assistant coach for Philippines
SEA Games
Gold medal – first place	2023 Phnom Penh	Team

Earl Timothy Cone (born December 14, 1957) is an American professional basketball coach who currently leads Barangay Ginebra San Miguel in the Philippine Basketball Association (PBA) and serves as head coach of the Philippine men's national basketball team. He is widely regarded as the most accomplished coach in PBA history, with twenty-six (26) championships to his name, including two (2) Grand Slam titles. He has also won five (5) Coach of the Year awards and holds the record for the most coaching wins in league history, with over one thousand (1,000) victories.

Cone is a proponent of the triangle offense.

== Early life and education ==
Cone was born in the United States and grew up in Oregon. He moved to the Philippines when he was nine years old after his father came to the country to work in the logging industry. Cone attended a public elementary school in Baler, Aurora and later at International School Manila.

Cone returned to the United States when he was 18 to study at Menlo College in California and the George Washington University in Washington D.C. After college, Cone worked at a bank in San Francisco before returning to the Philippines at 24.

== Commentary career ==
Cone worked as a Vintage Television's basketball analyst for PBA coverages from 1986 until 1989.

== Coaching career ==
=== Club ===
==== Alaska Milk (1989–2011) ====
1989, after working for Vintage Sports, Cone took over as the coach of the Alaska Air Force with players such as the famed Bruise Brothers duo of Yoyoy Villamin and Ricky Relosa, and Abet Guidaben. A year later, Cone led the Air Force to the finals of the 1990 PBA Third Conference. Alaska blew a 2–0 lead in the best-of-five series to suffer one of the biggest collapses in PBA history, losing to Purefoods in five games.

Cone was barred from coaching in the 1991 PBA All-Filipino Conference due to a February 1990 case filed by the Basketball Coaches Association of the Philippines questioning the alien employment permit given to Cone by the Department of Labor and Employment. The group's complaints stemmed from Article 40 of the Labor Code that only allows the hiring of a foreigner only after determining that no Philippine resident is competent, able, and willing to perform services at the time of application. The Supreme Court of the Philippines ruled against General Milling Corporation, Cone's corporate employer, in April 1991. He was temporarily replaced that time by assistant coach Chot Reyes. Cone was able to return to PBA coaching when he gained permanent resident status after his August 1991 marriage to Filipina girlfriend Cristina "Cris" Viaplana. Cone and Alaska won their first championship by defeating Ginebra San Miguel in the 1991 Third Conference. That team was led by Jojo Lastimosa, Eugene Quilban and Bong Alvarez.

After several struggles, Cone's team would have a strong group of locals Lastimosa, Johnny Abarrientos, Bong Hawkins, Jeffrey Cariaso and Poch Juinio, while having import Sean Chambers for the Milkmen. From 1994 to 1998, the Milkmen won eight titles in 14 conferences during the stretch. The highlight of that run, though, would come in the 1996 season when Alaska won the coveted PBA Grand Slam, becoming the third franchise and the fourth team to win a Grand Slam in the history of the league. While Alaska continued to dominate by adding Kenneth Duremdes in 1997. Duremdes, playing a limited role with the Pop Cola franchise, rose up to the occasion in 1998 under Cone's tutelage, winning the PBA Most Valuable Player Award at 24 years of age. That year, Cone was hired as the coach of the Philippine Centennial Team led by Duremdes, Abarrientos, Lastimosa, three players on Cone's Alaska team, and PBA stars Alvin Patrimonio, Marlou Aquino, Vergel Meneses, Allan Caidic, with defensive anchor Andy Seigle and rising star Olsen Racela. That team won a bronze medal in the 1998 Asian Games in Bangkok, Thailand.

Alaska won the 2000 All-Filipino Cup, but afterwards, the team faced rebuilding and traded away several remnants of the old Alaska. Cone, however, would lead the young team of John Arigo and Ali Peek to runner-up finishes in the 2002 Governors' and All-Filipino Cup. A year later, the Aces added UAAP star Mike Cortez and Brandon Cablay, leading Alaska to the 2003 PBA Invitational Cup championship, Cone's 11th title.

On July 17, 2006, Manila Standard reported that after his 17 years of service, Alaska is set to terminate Cone depending on a meeting between both parties after Cone's contract with the Aces expired on July 15. Rumors also speculated that his replacement will be his former assistant, former National team mentor Chot Reyes, with Cone staying on as team consultant.

However, a day later, the Aces' official website reported that Cone has agreed to a new deal to stay on as the team's head coach for the 2006–07 PBA season. Terms of the contract were not disclosed.

==== Purefoods (2011–2015) ====
On September 1, 2011, Alaska team owner Wilfred Uytengsu announced that it has "released Tim Cone as head coach of the Alaska Aces" after his 22 years of service for the Alaska Aces. Uytengsu remarked that Cone requested to be released a week earlier. Cone was quick to deny in a press conference that he is set to coach B-Meg Llamados, another PBA team.

On September 14, 2011, Tim Cone was at the B-Meg Llamados practice that day and was introduced as the new head coach. He tapped former Alaska players Johnny Abarrientos and Jeffrey Cariaso as assistant coaches. The two new assistant coaches were joined by current assistant coach Koy Banal.

On May 6, 2012, the Llamados won the 2012 PBA Commissioner's Cup championship 4–3 over defending champion Talk 'N Text Tropang Texters. This was Cone's 14th title, and his first with B-Meg.

On October 25, 2013, the Llamados, under Cone's tutelage, won the PBA Governors' Cup championship, after beating Petron Blaze Boosters. By winning the season-ending best-of-seven series 4–3, the former Purefoods ballclub won its second championship over the last five conferences and more importantly the 15th career title for Cone, putting the veteran coach in the company of the great Baby Dalupan at the top of the all-time list.

On February 26, 2014, Cone won his 16th PBA title as he guided the Mixers to their 11th title against the Rain or Shine Elasto Painters. They beat the E-Painters in six games. With this win, he broke legendary Baby Dalupan's record. On May 15, 2014, San Mig Coffee Mixers beat the Talk N' Text Tropang Texters in Game 4 of a best-of-five series, where San Mig earned the chance to capture the rare Grand Slam. This championship gave Tim Cone his 17th PBA title. He clinched his 18th title, and again made history by being the first mentor to win two Grand Slams after he steered San Mig Coffee to become Grand Slam Champions while accomplishing four straight championships and grabbing the 2014 Governor's Cup title.

==== Barangay Ginebra San Miguel (2015–present) ====
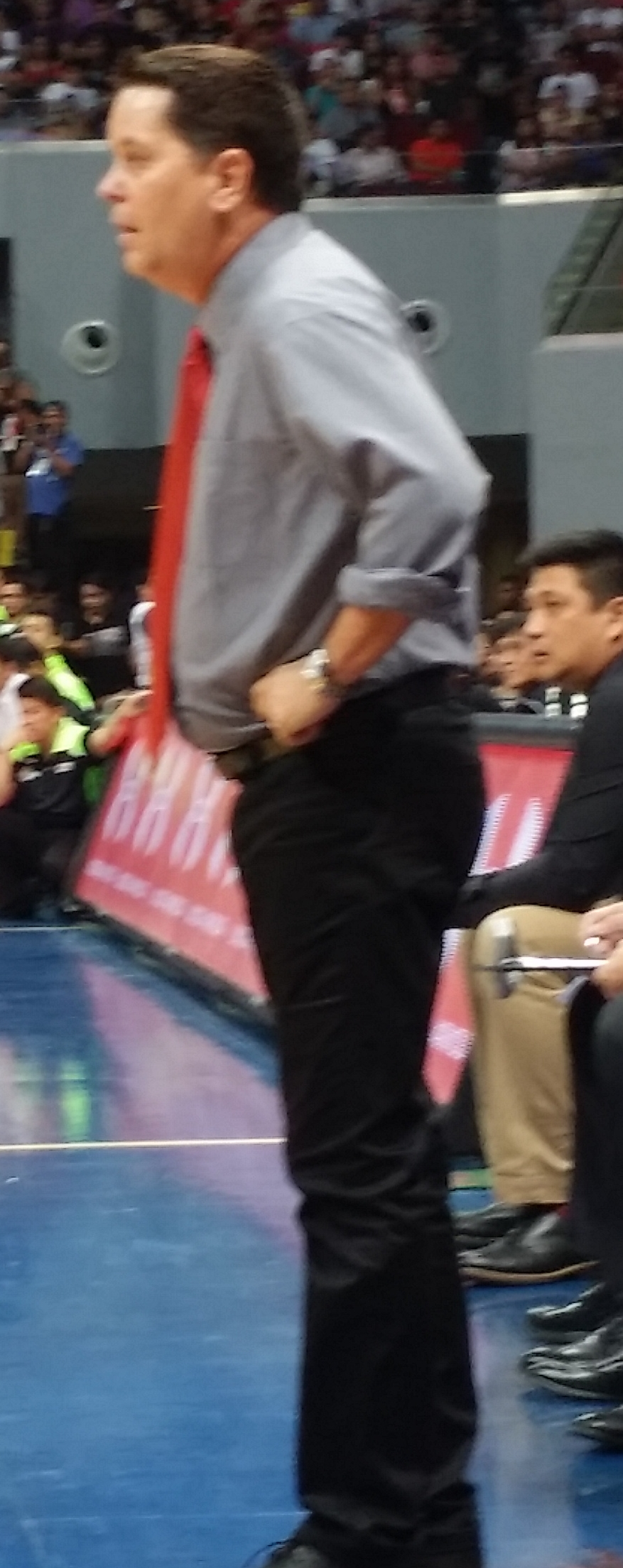
Cone while coaching Barangay Ginebra in 2015.

On July 20, 2015, San Miguel Corporation president Ramon Ang confirmed the appointment of Cone as the new head coach of Barangay Ginebra San Miguel. The reassignment of Cone will seek to end the curse of Ginebra which last won in the 2008 Fiesta Conference.

On October 4, 2016, Cone led Brgy. Ginebra to its first finals appearance since 2013. Ginebra defeated sister team San Miguel Beermen in a do-or-die Game 5, 117–92. Ginebra went on to face the Meralco Bolts in the finals and winning in six games (4–2), giving the team its first championship after 8 years of drought. Cone later led Ginebra to six more championships.

On November 18, 2022, he recorded his 1000th win, the most wins for a PBA coach.

=== National team ===
Cone has led the Philippine men's national basketball team as its head coach. He guided the Philippine Centennial Team to a bronze medal at the 1998 Asian Games. Prior to that, the national team under Cone's watch had a training camp in the U.S. and won the 1998 William Jones Cup. In September 2019, he was appointed head coach of the national team again for the 2019 Southeast Asian Games following the resignation of Yeng Guiao following the Philippine's poor performance in the 2019 FIBA Basketball World Cup.

Cone was appointed to coach the national team for the 2023 Asian Games after Chot Reyes stepped down shortly following the 2023 FIBA Basketball World Cup. Despite taking over on short notice, Cone was able to lead the team to a gold medal finish in the continental competition, their first since the 1962 Asian Games.

== Personal life ==
Cone is married to Cristina Viaplana, a Filipina, sister of former La Salle Green Archer Eddie Viaplana. They got married in August 1991 after dating for seven years. Cone's daughter works in the United States as of 2019. He can also speak Tagalog, although he prefers to speak in English in press conferences.

== List of PBA championships ==
26× PBA champion, 41× finals appearances

in Alaska Franchise (13):

- 1991 Third Conference
- 1994 Governors'
- 1995 Governors'
- 1996 All-Filipino
- 1996 Commissioner's
- 1996 Governors'
- 1997 Governors'
- 1998 All-Filipino
- 1998 Commissioner's
- 2000 All-Filipino
- 2003 Invitational
- 2007 Fiesta
- 2010 Fiesta

in Purefoods Franchise (5):

- 2012 Commissioner's
- 2013 Governors'
- 2013–14 Philippine
- 2014 Commissioner's
- 2014 Governors'

in Barangay Ginebra San Miguel (8):

- 2016 Governors'
- 2017 Governors'
- 2018 PBA Commissioner's
- 2019 Governors'
- 2020 Philippine
- 2021 Governors'
- 2022–23 Commissioner's
- 2026 Commissioner's

== Coaching record ==
Team	Year	G	W	L	W–L%	Result
Alaska	1989	56	26	26	.500	Third place
Alaska	1990	59	29	30	.491	Finals
Alaska	1991	56	31	25	.554	Champions
Alaska	1992	47	21	26	.446	Semifinals
Alaska	1993	39	18	21	.461	Semifinals
Alaska	1994	73	45	28	.616	Champions
Alaska	1995	75	46	29	.613	Champions
Alaska	1996	72	51	21	.708	Champions
Alaska	1997	60	35	25	.583	Champions
Alaska	1998	66	41	25	.621	Champions
Alaska	1999	56	32	24	.571	Finals
Alaska	2000	49	31	18	.633	Champions
Alaska	2001	46	23	23	.500	Semifinals
Alaska	2002	59	31	28	.525	Finals
Alaska	2003	56	31	25	.554	Champions
Alaska	2004–05	45	24	21	.533	Quarterfinals
Alaska	2005–06	48	24	24	.500	Third place
Alaska	2006–07	53	30	23	.566	Champions
Alaska	2007–08	47	25	22	.532	Semifinals
Alaska	2008–09	46	25	21	.543	Finals
Alaska	2009–10	62	39	23	.629	Lost 2010 Philippine Cup finals Won 2010 Fiesta Conference finals
Alaska	2010–11	42	22	20	.524	Lost 2011 Philippine Cup quarterfinals Lost 2011 Commissioner's Cup quarterfinals Lost 2011 Governors' Cup semifinals
B-Meg	2011–12	62	38	24	.613	Lost 2012 Philippine Cup quarterfinals Won 2012 Commissioner's Cup finals Lost 2012 PBA Governors' Cup finals
San Mig Coffee	2012–13	64	38	26	.594	Lost 2013 Philippine Cup semifinals Lost 2013 Commissioner's Cup semifinals Won 2013 Governors' Cup finals
San Mig Super Coffee	2013–14	71	41	30	.577	Won 2014 Philippine Cup finals Won 2014 Commissioner's Cup finals Won 2014 Governors' Cup finals
Star	2014–15	45	24	21	.533	Lost 2015 Philippine Cup quarterfinals Lost 2015 Commissioner's Cup semifinals Lost 2015 Governors' Cup semifinals
Barangay Ginebra	2015–16	49	31	18	.633	Lost 2016 Philippine Cup quarterfinals Lost 2016 Commissioner's Cup quarterfinals Won 2016 Governors' Cup finals
Barangay Ginebra	2016–17	64	40	24	.625	Lost 2017 Philippine Cup finals Lost 2017 Commissioner's Cup semifinals Won 2017 Governors' Cup finals
Barangay Ginebra	2017–18	57	35	22	.614	Lost in 2018 Philippine Cup semifinals Won 2018 Commissioner's Cup finals Lost in 2018 Governor's Cup semifinals
Barangay Ginebra	2018–19	52	33	19	.635	Lost in 2019 Philippine Cup quarterfinals Lost in 2019 Commissioner's Cup semifinals Won 2019 Governors' Cup finals
Barangay Ginebra	2020	22	16	6	.727	Won 2020 Philippine Cup finals
Career		1694	976	718	.576	25 championships
