= July 2004 in sports =

<<	July 2004					>>
Su	Mo	Tu	We	Th	Fr	Sa
				1	2	3
4	5	6	7	8	9	10
11	12	13	14	15	16	17
18	19	20	21	22	23	24
25	26	27	28	29	30	31
Sports

This list shows notable sports-related deaths, events, and outcomes that occurred in July of 2004.

== Deaths ==
- 26 Rubén Gómez
- 24 Cotton Fitzsimmons
- 10 Rudy LaRusso
- 9 Tony Lupien
- 5 Rodger Ward

== July 31, 2004 ==
- Rugby union: In the third match of the Tri Nations Series, held in Perth, Australia, the Wallabies (Australia) celebrate the 100th Test appearance for captain George Gregan with a hard-fought 30–26 win over the Springboks (South Africa). (BBC)
- Asian Cup 2004: Two quarter final matches were held. The Republic of Korea is defeated by Iran 4–3 after two Korean own goals in the second half, Iran advances to the semi-finals to face China. In the other game, Japan ties Oman after extra time 1–1 and a penalty shootout proceeds; after the first five rounds of shootout, the teams were tied 3–3, but Japan wins the 7th round to advance to the other semi-final match against Bahrain.
- Baseball: The Boston Red Sox trade star shortstop Nomar Garciaparra to the Chicago Cubs as part of a blockbuster 4-team trade. In addition to Nomar, the deal sees Montreal Expos shortstop Orlando Cabrera and Minnesota Twins first baseman Doug Mientkiewicz move to the Red Sox, while shortstop Alex Gonzalez, the previous starter for the Cubs, joins the Expos. Four minor leaguers are also included. The deal is completed just before the trading deadline of 4 p.m. EDT. ESPN.com
- Boxing: Erik Morales decisions Carlos Hernández in twelve rounds to unify his WBC world, Jr. Lightweight title with the IBF one, and Iván Calderón defeats former world champion Roberto Leyva by unanimous twelve round decision to retain his WBO world Minimunweight title. (Boxing Central)
- MLS all star game: The Eastern conference defeats the Western conference, 3 goals to 2.(ESPN soccernet)
- Basketball: The United States Dream Team defeats the Puerto Rican National Basketball Team, 96–71, in a friendly game that forms part of both teams' preparation toward the Olympic Games.(ESPN)

== July 30, 2004 ==
- Asian Cup 2004: China defeats Iraq 3:0 in the first quarter final match to advance to the semi-finals stage for the first time since 1984. In the other match Uzbekistan is defeated by Bahrain in penalties 4:3, after an aet result of 2:2; This ends Uzbekistan's hopeful run at the Asian Cup.
- Boxing: In a major upset, Mike Tyson gets knocked out in four rounds by journeyman Danny Williams. In the same undercard, Nelson Dieppa defends his WBO world, Jr. Flyweight title with a twelve round majority decision over Ulises Solís, and Laila Ali defeats Mónica Núñez by a knockout in nine rounds.(Boxing Central)

== July 29, 2004 ==
- UEFA Cup 2004–05 First qualifying round, second leg (Team progressing to next round in bold):
  - FC Shakhtyor Soligorsk 1 – 2 **FC Nistru Otaci**
  - **FK Ventspils** 8 – 0 B68 Toftir
  - F91 Dudelange 1 – 2 **FK Ekranas**
  - **NK Zeljeznicar Sarajevo** 4 – 0 SS Pennarossa
  - FC Shamkir 1 – 4 **FC Tbilisi**
  - FC TVMK Tallinn 1 – 2 **ÍA Akranes**
  - FC Etzella Ettelbruck 1 – 3 **FC Haka**
  - **FK Modriča** 3 – 0 FC Santa Coloma
  - AC Allianssi 1 – 2 **Glentoran F.C.**
  - FK Karabakh 0 – 1 **FK Dukla Banská Bystrica**
  - **FK Žalgiris Vilnius** 2 – 0 Portadown F.C.
  - **NK Primorje** 2 – 0 Marsaxlokk F.C.
  - KS Dinamo Tirana 1 – 4 **FC Oţelul Galaţi**
  - Longford Town F.C. 2 – 3 **FC Vaduz**
  - **Fimleikafélag Hafnarfjarðar** 3 – 1 Haverfordwest County F.C.
  - Total Network Solutions F.C. 1 – 2 **Östers IF**
  - **Budapest Honvéd FC** 1 – 1 FC Mika (Yerevan)
  - **FK Liepājas Metalurgs** 8 – 1 B36 Tórshavn
  - FK Sloga Jugomagnat 1 – 4 **AC Omonia**
  - Birkirkara F.C. 2 – 1 **KF Partizani Tirana**
  - FC Banants 0 – 2 **FC Illichivets Mariupol**
  - **NK Maribor** 1 – 1 FK Sileks
  - **Dinamo Tbilisi FC** 1 – 0 FC BATE Borisov
  - **FC Tiraspol** 2 – 0 FC Shirak (UEFA.com)
- Basketball: Lisa Leslie reaches her 4,000th WNBA career points, and Mwadi Mabika makes a 60-foot-long (18 m) shot with one second to go before halftime, as the Los Angeles Sparks defeat the Sacramento Monarchs, 85–80, in double overtime, at Sacramento.(WNBA)
- Women's boxing: Mia St. John defeats Talia Smith by a four round decision.(Womenboxing.com)

== July 28, 2004 ==
- UEFA Champions League 2004–05 Second qualifying round, first leg:
  - APOEL F.C. 2 – 2 AC Sparta Praha
  - MŠK Žilina 0 – 1 FC Dinamo București
  - BSC Young Boys 2 – 2 FK Crvena Zvezda
  - Skonto Riga 1 – 1 Trabzonspor
  - Club Brugge KV 2 – 0 PFC Lokomotiv Plovdiv
  - HNK Hajduk Split 3 – 2 Shelbourne
  - Djurgårdens IF 0 – 0 FBK Kaunas
  - Rosenborg BK 2 – 1 FC Sheriff Tiraspol (UEFA.com)

== July 27, 2004 ==
- UEFA Champions League 2004–05 Second qualifying round, first leg:
  - SK Tirana 2 – 3 Ferencváros
  - WIT Georgia Tbilisi 2 – 8 Wisła Kraków
  - Neftchi 0 – 0 PFC CSKA Moskva
  - HJK Helsinki 0 – 0 Maccabi Tel Aviv F.C.
  - NK Gorica 1 – 2 FC København
  - Pyunik 1 – 3 FC Shakhtar Donetsk (UEFA.com)
- UEFA Cup 2004–05 First qualifying round, second leg (Team progressing to next round in bold):
  - Bohemian 1 – 3 **FC Levadia Tallinn** (BBC)

== July 26, 2004 ==
- Canoe polo: During the weekend of 24 to 25 July, the Netherlands defeated Germany 5–4 in the final of the canoe polo 2004 world championships held in Miyoshi, Japan. In the first half of the final the Dutch dominated and this resulted in a score of 3–1 by half time. The perseverance of the German team was strong and they fought back to a score of 3–3. Just ten seconds before half time Jeroen Dieperink scored for the Dutch. Because of this setback Germany had to play a more offensive game in the second half. Two minutes before the end of the match Wouter Ottjes scored the winning goal for the Netherlands.
- Test cricket: England beat the West Indies by 210 runs in the first Test at Lord's. (BBC)

== July 25, 2004 ==
- Copa América: In the final match Brazil defeat Argentina by 4 goals to 2 after a penalty shoot-out, the teams being tied 2 – 2 at the end of normal play. (BBC)
- Tour de France: Lance Armstrong wins a record-breaking sixth consecutive Tour de France. Richard Virenque set a new record of seven mountains classification victories, while Robbie McEwen wins the points classification. Russian Vladimir Karpets wins the white jersey for best young rider. (LeTour)
- Grand Prix: Michael Schumacher (Ferrari) wins the German Grand Prix, equalling his own record of 11 victories in one season and closing in on his seventh Formula One championship. It is also his sixth consecutive victory, matching Alberto Ascari's single-season record set in 1952. Jenson Button (BAR-Honda) finishes second and Fernando Alonso (Renault) third.
- Paul Molitor and Dennis Eckersley are inducted into the Baseball Hall of Fame in Cooperstown, New York.

== July 24, 2004 ==
- Tour de France: In a dominating performance in the last individual time trial in and around Besançon, Lance Armstrong scores his fifth stage win of the 2004 Tour, putting an exclamation point on a virtually certain sixth consecutive Tour win. Jan Ullrich finishes second in the stage, 1:01 behind. Andreas Klöden moves up to second overall and Ivan Basso stays ahead of Ullrich for third; this will be the first time that Ullrich has finished off the podium in seven Tours. (ESPN)
- Rugby union: The All Blacks (New Zealand) defeat the Springboks (South Africa) 23–21 in the second match of the Tri Nations Series in Christchurch, New Zealand. (Sydney Morning Herald)
- Horse racing: Frankie Dettori rides Doyen to victory in the King George VI and Queen Elizabeth Stakes at Ascot. It's Dettori's fourth win in the race, and the fifth for Godolphin trainer Saeed bin Suroor. (BBC)
- Baseball: After a bench clearing brawl provoked by an altercation between Alex Rodriguez and Jason Varitek, the Boston Red Sox defeat the New York Yankees, 11–10, at Fenway Park, Boston.(ESPN)
- Boxing: In a long-awaited matchup, Arturo Gatti beats Leonard Dorin by a second round knockout, at Atlantic City, New Jersey. (AOL)
- Basketball: Former Phoenix Suns coach Cotton Fitzsimmons dies at the age of 72.(Suns)

== July 23, 2004 ==
- NBA: In a key development involving the upcoming trial of Kobe Bryant on sexual assault charges, Colorado District Judge Terry Ruckriegle has ruled that details of the sex life of Bryant's accuser in the three days before her July 1, 2003 hospital examination can be admitted as evidence in the trial. (ESPN)

== July 22, 2004 ==
- Tour de France: Lance Armstrong wins Stage 17 at Le Grand-Bornand, the first time anyone has won three successive mountain stages since Gino Bartali in 1948, and now looks unbeatable barring a major accident before next Sunday's finish in Paris. Richard Virenque amasses an unbeatable points total for his seventh King of the Mountains title. (LeTour)
- An unnamed high-ranking official of the Tour de France states that American cyclist Lance Armstrong will not compete in the 2005 Tour preferring to ride in either Italy's or Spain's national tour. Bill Stapleton, Armstrong's agent, and Dan Osipow, communication director, deny the report. (NYT)
- Asian Cup 2004: Three-time Asian champions Saudi Arabia suffers a 1–0 loss to Uzbekistan by an early goal on the 13th minute.

== July 21, 2004 ==
- Tour de France: Lance Armstrong wins Stage 16, an individual time trial up the mountain to Alpe d'Huez, the only rider to finish in less than 40 minutes. Ivan Basso loses 2 minutes 23 seconds on this stage, placing him 3 minutes and 48 seconds behind Armstrong (LeTour)
- UEFA Champions League 2004–05 First qualifying round, second leg (teams progressing to the next round in bold):
  - Jeunesse Esch 1 – 0 **FC Sheriff Tiraspol**
  - **SK Tirana** 0 – 1 FC Gomel
  - **HJK Helsinki** 1 – 0 Linfield
  - Rhyl 1 – 3 **Skonto Riga**
  - HB Tórshavn 3 – 2 **WIT Georgia Tbilisi**
  - **FBK Kaunas** 4 – 1 Sliema Wanderers
  - **Neftchi** 1 – 0 Široki Brijeg (Neftchi win on the away goals rule)
  - **Shelbourne** 0 – 0 KR Reykjavik (Shelbourne win on away goals rule)
  - **NK Gorica** 3 – 1 FC Flora Tallinn
  - **Pyunik** 1 – 1 FK Pobeda (UEFA.com)

== July 20, 2004 ==
- Tour de France: Lance Armstrong wins Stage 15 at Villard-de-Lans and takes the overall lead in the race. Ivan Basso, who finished second in the stage, moves into second place overall, 1:25 back. (ESPN)

== July 19, 2004 ==
- The Canadian Olympic Team for the 2004 Summer Olympics was announced, and will include judoka Nicolas Gill as flag-bearer. (CBC)

== July 18, 2004 ==
- PGA Tour golf: Todd Hamilton wins the 133rd Open Championship at Royal Troon Golf Club in Ayrshire, Scotland, defeating Ernie Els in a 4-hole playoff after a 72-hole tie. (AP)

== July 17, 2004 ==
- Tour de France: Lance Armstrong wins the 13th stage at Plateau de Beille, dropping almost all of his main rivals. French rider Thomas Voeckler retains the yellow jersey, but his margin over Armstrong has shrunk to 22 seconds. Italy's Ivan Basso, who was the only rider to stay with Armstrong today, is third overall. (ESPN) During the stage, American rider Tyler Hamilton withdraws from the race due to severe back pain. (NBC Sports)
- Rugby Union:
  - In the opening match of the Tri Nations Series, held in a very wet and windy Westpac Stadium in Wellington, New Zealand, the All Blacks (New Zealand) defeat the Wallabies (Australia) 16–7. With the win, the All Blacks retain the Bledisloe Cup. (BBC)
  - The Springboks (South Africa) defeat the touring Pacific Islanders 38–24 in Sydney, Australia. (BBC)
- Track and field: Citing exhaustion, Marion Jones pulls out of the finals of the women's 200 meters at the United States Olympic Trials in Sacramento, California. She will compete in the Athens Olympics in the long jump and 4x100 and 4x400 relays. (ESPN)
- The Asian Cup kicks off in Beijing, China. Hosts PR China ties Bahrain 2:2.

== July 16, 2004 ==
- Baseball: Cleveland Indians catcher Víctor Martínez hit 3 home runs, singled twice, drew a walk, and drove in a career-high seven runs in a perfect 5-for-5 game, recorded his first career multi-homer game, as the Indians belted eight homers-21 hits in an 18–6 rout of the Seattle Mariners. Matt Lawton, Casey Blake, Ben Broussard, Travis Hafner and Jody Gerut added shots. Lawton, Martinez and Blake homered in consecutive at-bats in the third inning. It was the first time Cleveland had hit three consecutive homers since Jim Thome, Albert Belle, and Julio Franco accomplished the feat on September 12, 1996. Broussard, Martinez, Hafner and Gerut all homered in the ninth inning as the Indians matched their team record for home runs in one game, previously accomplished at Milwaukee on April 25, 1997. Cleveland also set a new Safeco Field HR record, surpassing the six homers hit by the Kansas City Royals in 2003. The major league record for home runs in a game is 10, set by the Toronto Blue Jays in 1987.
- National Hockey League:
  - The Atlanta Thrashers' Dany Heatley is charged for the death of former teammate Dan Snyder who died in a car accident in which Heatley was recklessly speeding. (CBC).
  - The St. Louis Blues' Mike Danton pleads guilty to charges of conspiracy to commit murder, involving an unsuccessful plan to hire a hitman to kill his agent. (CBC)

== July 15, 2004 ==
- UEFA Cup 2004–05 First qualifying round, first leg:
  - FK Dukla Banská Bystrica 3 – 0 FK Karabakh
  - FK Ekranas 1 – 0 F91 Dudelange
  - KF Partizani Tirana 4 – 2 Birkirkara F.C.
  - FC BATE Borisov 2 – 3 Dinamo Tbilisi FC
  - FC Shirak 1 – 2 FC Tiraspol
  - FC Nistru Otaci 1 – 1 FC Shakhtyor Soligorsk
  - Östers IF 2 – 0 Total Network Solutions F.C.
  - Portadown F.C. 2 – 2 FK Žalgiris Vilnius
  - B68 Toftir 0 – 3 FK Ventspils
  - FC Levadia Tallinn 0 – 0 Bohemian
  - B36 Tórshavn 1 – 3 FK Liepājas Metalurgs
  - FC Haka 2 – 1 FC Etzella Ettelbruck
  - FC Tbilisi 1 – 0 FC Shamkir
  - FC Santa Coloma 0 – 1 FK Modriča
  - ÍA Akranes 4 – 2 FC TVMK Tallinn
  - Haverfordwest County F.C. 0 – 1 Fimleikafélag Hafnarfjarðar
  - FC Vaduz 1 – 0 Longford Town F.C.
  - FC Illichivets Mariupol 2 – 0 FC Banants
  - FK Sileks 0 – 1 NK Maribor
  - Marsaxlokk F.C. 0 – 1 NK Primorje
  - FC Oţelul Galaţi 4 – 0 KS Dinamo Tirana
  - AC Omonia 4 – 0 FK Sloga Jugomagnat
  - Glentoran F.C. 2 – 2 AC Allianssi
  - SS Pennarossa 1 – 5 NK Željeznicar Sarajevo (UEFA.com)
- Basketball:
  - Kobe Bryant signs a new contract with the Los Angeles Lakers for $136.4 million over seven years. (ESPN)
  - Cynthia Cooper has her jersey, number 14, retired as her former team, the Houston Comets, defeat the defending WNBA champions, Detroit Shock, 97–61.(WNBA)
- Track and field: At the United States Olympic Trials in Sacramento, California, Marion Jones wins the long jump; her series of six final-round jumps included the second-longest jump in the world so far in 2004. (ESPN)

== July 14, 2004 ==
- UEFA Champions League 2004–05 First qualifying round, first leg:
  - FC Gomel 0 – 2 SK Tirana
  - Linfield 0 – 1 HJK Helsinki
  - FC Sheriff Tiraspol 2 – 0 Jeunesse Esch
  - WIT Georgia Tbilisi 5 – 0 HB Tórshavn
  - KR Reykjavik 2 – 2 Shelbourne
  - Skonto Riga 4 – 0 Rhyl
  - FC Flora Tallinn 2 – 4 NK Gorica (UEFA.com)
- NBA:
  - The Los Angeles Lakers officially consummate a trade with the Miami Heat to send star center Shaquille O'Neal to the Heat for Caron Butler, Lamar Odom, Brian Grant and a first-round draft pick. O'Neal had been requesting a trade since the end of the Lakers' NBA Finals loss to the Detroit Pistons. (ESPN)
  - The Los Angeles Clippers trade Melvin Ely and Eddie House to the expansion Charlotte Bobcats for their second-round picks in the 2005 and 2006 drafts. The move is seen as an attempt to clear salary cap room to make an offer to lure Los Angeles Lakers star Kobe Bryant to the Clippers. (ESPN)
  - The Phoenix Suns sign former Clipper Quentin Richardson.(Suns)
- Major League Baseball: The Houston Astros fire manager Jimy Williams after the Astros fell to fifth place in the NL Central by the All-Star Break, 10½ games behind the St. Louis Cardinals. Phil Garner was named interim manager until a search can be conducted following the season. (ESPN)
- Major League Soccer: The league announces that a new franchise based in Salt Lake City will begin play in the 2005 season. Along with a previously announced expansion franchise owned by Mexican club Chivas, called Chivas U.S.A., this will bring the total number of MLS teams to 12. (ESPN Soccernet)

== July 13, 2004 ==
- UEFA Champions League 2004–05 First qualifying round, first leg:
  - FK Pobeda 1 – 3 Pyunik
  - Sliema Wanderers 0 – 2 FBK Kaunas
  - Široki Brijeg 2 – 1 Neftchi (UEFA.com)
- UEFA Cup 2004–05 First qualifying round, first leg:
  - FC Mika (Yerevan) 0 – 1 Budapest Honved
- MLB All-Star Game: The American League defeats the National League, 9–4, securing home-field advantage for the World Series. Roger Clemens gave up six runs to the AL in the first inning, including home runs to Manny Ramírez and Alfonso Soriano, who was named the All-Star Game's MVP. (ESPN)
- Test cricket: Shane Warne equals Muttiah Muralitharan's world record of 527 Test wickets in the second Test between Australia and Sri Lanka in Cairns. (BBC)

== July 12, 2004 ==
- MLB All-Star Game: In the Home Run Derby, the Baltimore Orioles' Miguel Tejada defeats the Houston Astros' Lance Berkman 5–4 in the finals. Tejada sets a record for a single competition with 27 total home runs.
- Copa América: Mexico's player Jared Borgetti has to return to Mexico due to the death of his sister. (Soccernet at ESPN)

== July 11, 2004 ==
- Track and field:
  - At the United States Olympic Trials in Sacramento, California, Tim Montgomery fails to qualify for the Olympics in the 100 meters, finishing seventh. This saves the United States Olympic Committee from a potentially embarrassing situation, as Montgomery has been officially charged with steroids use. The defending Olympic champion at that distance, Maurice Greene, finishes first. (ESPN)
  - Philip Rabinowitz (runner), a centenarian sprinter from South Africa, made it into the Guinness Book of World Records as the fastest 100-year-old to run 100 meters, in 30.86 seconds. (CNN)
- Copa América: Venezuela is named host of the 2007 tournament. (CNN)
- Centrobasket: The Dominican Republic defeats the two time defending champion, the Puerto Rican National Basketball Team, 75 to 74, to conquer the gold medal, at the Dominican Republic. (FIBA Americas, in Spanish)
- Formula One: Michael Schumacher wins the British Grand Prix at Silverstone. (BBC)
- NASCAR: Tony Stewart wins the Tropicana 400 at Chicagoland Speedway that was marred by a fight between the pit crews of Stewart and Kasey Kahne stemming from a crash involving the two on lap 127. Kahne's crew chief, Tommy Baldwin, was later fined US $10,000 for his role in the altercation. (ESPN) (ESPN)
- Champ Car: Sébastien Bourdais wins the Toronto Molson Indy, his third straight victory. (ESPN)
- PGA Tour: Mark Hensby wins the John Deere Classic at TPC at Deere Run in Silvis, Illinois, defeating John E. Morgan in a tie-breaking playoff. (ESPN)

== July 10, 2004 ==
- Football (soccer): Otto Rehhagel, who coached Greece to an astonishing victory at Euro 2004, officially turns down an offer to return to his homeland as Germany national team coach. (ESPN Soccernet)
- Copa América: Mexico beats Argentina 1–0. This is the first win by Mexico over Argentina at any international football event in history. (ESPN Soccernet) (ELORATINGS)
- NBA:
  - Shaquille O'Neal has reportedly approved a proposed trade that would send him from the Los Angeles Lakers to the Miami Heat in exchange for guard Caron Butler and forwards Lamar Odom and Brian Grant. (ESPN)
  - The Los Angeles Lakers announce Rudy Tomjanovich as their new coach, confirming reports from the previous day. Details of the contract were not announced, but the deal is reportedly for 5 years and $30 million. (ESPN)
- WNBA: Michael Cooper obtains a victory in his last game as coach of the Los Angeles Sparks, as the Sparks defeat the Houston Comets, 59–56, in Houston(WNBA)
- Track and field: At the United States Olympic track and field qualifying in Sacramento, California, Marion Jones finishes fifth in the 100 meter dash and therefore fails to qualify for the 2004 Summer Olympics in that event. (Voice of America)
- Major League Baseball: Barry Bonds is intentionally walked three times in a 3–1 San Francisco Giants win over the Arizona Diamondbacks. This gives him 71 intentional walks before the All-Star break, surpassing his own single-season record of 68, set in 2002. (ESPN)

== July 9, 2004 ==
- Tour de France: Early in Stage 6, Lance Armstrong crashes along with several other riders. Armstrong suffered a minor scrape of one leg, but was not otherwise hurt, and soon rejoined the peloton. He and major rival Jan Ullrich completely avoided a second crash near the finish that involved all but about 30 riders. There were no major changes to the overall classification. (ESPN)
- NBA: Rudy Tomjanovich, who coached the Houston Rockets to NBA titles in 1994 and 1995, agrees to coach the Los Angeles Lakers. The team will officially announce the signing in a July 10 press conference. (ESPN)

== July 8, 2004 ==
- Tour de France: Lance Armstrong relinquishes the overall lead after a wind- and rain-swept Stage 5. The peloton, which included Armstrong and all his key competitors, gave up over 12 minutes to a five-man breakaway. The riders in the breakaway are not considered to be threats to win the Tour. (ESPN)
- The Minnesota Twins win three straight shutouts, a first for the ball club and only the fourth time it has occurred for a Major League Baseball team. The games were against the Kansas City Royals.

== July 7, 2004 ==
- Tour de France: Lance Armstrong takes the overall lead after the Stage 4 team time trial of the Tour de France. Six of the top seven places in the general classification are occupied by members of Armstrong's US Postal Service team. Armstrong's nearest major contender, Phonak team leader and former teammate Tyler Hamilton, is in eighth, 36 seconds back. (ESPN)
- Olympic qualifying: American swimmer Michael Phelps broke his own world record in the 400-meter individual medley competition with a time of 4:08.41. His previous record of 4:09.09 was set at the 2003 World Championships in Barcelona. (ESPN)

== July 6, 2004 ==
- NHL: Dominik Hašek, a two-time NHL MVP and six-time winner of the Vezina Trophy as the league's top goalie, signs a multiyear contract with the Ottawa Senators. (ESPN) (Ottawa Senators)

== July 5, 2004 ==
- Basketball: Hall of Fame coach Mike Krzyzewski turns down an offer to coach the Los Angeles Lakers, opting to stay with Duke University. (ESPN)
- Major League Baseball: Los Angeles Dodgers closer Éric Gagné fails to hold a 5–3 lead in the ninth inning against the Arizona Diamondbacks; the Dodgers go on to win the game 6–5 in 10 innings. This ends Gagné's record streak of consecutive saves at 84, and is his first blown save since August 26, 2002. (ESPN)

== July 4, 2004 ==
- Euro 2004: Greece win the final, defeating host nation Portugal 1–0. It's the first major football championship triumph for Greece, and a surprise result. (BBC) (ESPN)
- Formula One: Michael Schumacher wins the French Grand Prix, his ninth victory in 10 races this season. (ESPN)
- Wimbledon Championships:
  - Defending champion Roger Federer retains the men's singles title, beating Andy Roddick 4–6 7–5 7–6 (7–3) 6–4. (BBC)
  - In the men's doubles, Todd Woodbridge and Jonas Björkman defend their title by defeating Julian Knowle and Nenad Zimonjić 6–1 6–4 4–6 6–4. Woodbridge has now won nine doubles titles at Wimbledon, a new record. (BBC)
  - Cara Black and Rennae Stubbs win the women's doubles, defeating Ai Sugiyama and Liezel Huber 6–3 7–6 (7–5). (BBC)
  - Wayne Black and his sister Cara Black defeat Todd Woodbridge and Alicia Molik 3–6 7–6 (10–8) 6–4 in the final of the mixed doubles. (BBC)
- MLB: The 2004 All-Star Game selections are announced. For the AL, Iván Rodríguez, Jason Giambi, Alfonso Soriano, Alex Rodriguez, Derek Jeter, Vladimir Guerrero, Manny Ramírez and Ichiro Suzuki were named as starters. For the NL, Mike Piazza, Albert Pujols, Jeff Kent, Scott Rolen, Édgar Rentería, Barry Bonds, Ken Griffey Jr. and Sammy Sosa were all named as starters. With Bonds, Griffey and Sosa in the outfield for the NL, it marks the first time in All-Star history where three players with 500 career home runs will start the game. (ESPN)
- Basketball: The Ponce Lions defeat the Coamo Marathon Runners, 92–75, winning the 2004 BSN Championship in a 4–3 series.
- PGA Tour: Stephen Ames from Trinidad and Tobago wins the Cialis Western Open with a 10-under par 274 (67–73–64–70). Steve Lowery finished second, two strokes back. (ESPN)
- LPGA: Meg Mallon shoots a 6-under par 65 to win her second U.S. Women's Open, two strokes ahead of Annika Sörenstam. (ESPN)
- IRL: Buddy Rice wins the Argent Mortgage Indy 300 at Kansas Speedway by .0051 seconds over Vítor Meira. It is the second-closest finish in IRL history. (ESPN)

== July 3, 2004 ==
- Wimbledon Championships: Maria Sharapova wins her first Grand Slam title, defeating Serena Williams 6–1 6–4. (BBC) (Reuters)
- Tour de France: Swiss rider Fabian Cancellara wins the first time trial at the Tour de France to secure the yellow jersey. Lance Armstrong finishes second in the first day of racing. (ESPN)
- NASCAR Nextel Cup: Jeff Gordon wins the 2004 running of the Pepsi 400 at Daytona International Speedway. (AP)
- Champ Car: Sébastien Bourdais wins his second straight Cleveland Grand Prix. (ESPN)

== July 2, 2004 ==
- MLB: The Arizona Diamondbacks fire manager Bob Brenly, the same manager that took them to the World Series in 2001. (L.A. Daily News)
- Cycling: British cyclist David Millar is suspended from competition by British Cycling, including the Olympic Games, following a confession to a French investigating magistrate that he had taken the hormone EPO. He had previously been banned from participating in the Tour de France which begins on Saturday. (BBC)

== July 1, 2004 ==
- Euro 2004: In the second semi-final Greece beat the Czech Republic 1–0 with a silver goal in the last minute of the first period of extra time. (BBC)
- Copa Libertadores: In the final, unfancied Colombian club Once Caldas stuns Argentina power Boca Juniors, which had won three of the previous four Copa Libertadores crowns, 2–0 in a penalty shootout. After a 0–0 draw in the first leg in Buenos Aires, the two clubs drew 1–1 in Manizales, Colombia. The final went to a penalty shootout because the Copa Libertadores does not use either extra time or the away goals rule. (FOX Sports) (ESPN)
- Wimbledon semi-finals:
  - The thirteenth seed, 17-year-old Russian Maria Sharapova, beats former champion Lindsay Davenport (USA) 2–6 7–6 (7–5) 6–1 to reach her first grand-slam final. (BBC)
  - Defending champion Serena Williams (USA) defeats Amélie Mauresmo (France) 6–7 (4–7) 7–5 6–4 (BBC)
- Basketball:
  - The Phoenix Suns sign high-profile free agent Steve Nash away from the Dallas Mavericks with a five-year, US $65M deal. (ESPN)
  - Long-time Duke University college basketball coach Mike Krzyzewski is offered the top coaching position with the Los Angeles Lakers, a position vacated by Phil Jackson following the Lakers' NBA Finals loss to the Detroit Pistons. The Lakers expect to announce a coaching replacement next week. (ESPN)
  - Former NBA center Manute Bol is seriously injured in a major car accident. The 43-year-old Sudanese-American activist sustained a broken neck and his immediate condition was unannounced. (ESPN)
  - BSN Finals: The Coamo Marathon Runners tie the best of seven series in game six, defeating the Ponce Lions, 101–72, in a game filled with protests by the Lions, who turned their backs on the local Runners' fans, the game's referees and the rival team during most of the fourth quarter, almost causing a riot. The Lions are fined a total of 12,000 dollars in fines.(BSNPR.COM in Spanish)
