= 1998 PBA Commissioner's Cup finals =

US basketball championship

Team	Coach	Wins
Alaska Milkmen	Tim Cone	4
San Miguel Beermen	Ron Jacobs	2
- Dates: August 2–14, 1998
- Television: VTV (IBC)
- Radio network: DWFM

PBA Commissioner's Cup finals chronology
- < 1997 1999 >

PBA finals chronology
- < 1998 All-Filipino 1998 Centennial >

The 1998 PBA Commissioner's Cup finals was the best-of-7 basketball championship series of the 1998 Commissioner's Cup, and the conclusion of the conference's playoffs. The Alaska Milkmen and San Miguel Beermen played for the 70th championship contested by the league, this serves as a rematch of their All-Filipino series.

The Alaska Milkmen won their 9th PBA title, defeating the San Miguel Beermen for the second time in the season, winning in six games. It was the third straight crown for Alaska, which had been into the finals series in 12 of the last 13 conferences as they continued their quest for another Grandslam season.

Kenneth Duremdes won on his second back-to-back finals MVP in Commissioner's Cup finals.

== Qualification ==
Alaska		San Miguel
Finished 9–2 (.818), 1st	Eliminations	Finished 6–5 (.545), tied for 2nd
Qualified outright	Quarterfinals	defeated 6th seed Mobiline
defeated Formula Shell, 3-2	Best-of-5 semifinals	defeated Pop Cola, 3-0

== Series scoring summary ==
Team	Game 1	Game 2	Game 3	Game 4	Game 5	Game 6	Wins
Alaska	107	106	81	83	92	85	4
San Miguel	97	89	88	92	84	74	2
Venue	Cuneta	Cuneta	Araneta	Cuneta	Cuneta	Araneta

== Games summary ==
=== Game 1 ===
VTV

August 2

Alaska Milkmen 107, San Miguel Beermen 97 (OT)
Pts: Devin Davis 33	Pts: Lamont Strothers 43
Alaska leads series, 1-0

Cuneta Astrodome, Pasay

The Beer enjoyed a 10-point spread, 88-78, going into the last 4:24 of regulation play, the Milkmen came charging back and a 12-0 blast shoved them ahead, Lamont Strothers knotted the score with two free throws sending the game into overtime.

=== Game 2 ===
VTV

August 4

Alaska Milkmen 106, San Miguel Beermen 89
Scoring by quarter: 25-23, 29-17, 25-19, 27-30
Pts: Devin Davis 25	Pts: Lamont Strothers 33
Alaska leads series, 2-0

Cuneta Astrodome, Pasay

From a measly two-point lead, 30-28, Alaska stormed on top, 42-28, 8:13 in the second quarter, In that stretch, Strothers was slapped a technical foul for shoving Lastimosa and Mike Mustre was tagged a deliberate foul for decking Devin Davis. The Milkmen maintain a 14-point spread, 54-40 at the half and stretched their lead to 20 points, 79-59 at the end of the third quarter. The Milkmen padded their advantage to 25 points, 98-73, 4:40 remaining in the contest.

=== Game 3 ===
VTV

August 7

Alaska Milkmen 81, San Miguel Beermen 88
Scoring by quarter: 23-12, 25-17, 17-35, 16-24
Pts: Devin Davis 29	Pts: Lamont Strothers 35
Alaska leads series, 2-1

Araneta Coliseum, Quezon City

San Miguel were down by 19 points, 29-48 at halftime. The Beer rallied from a 21-point deficit and were trailing by just a point, 64-65, entering the fourth period.

=== Game 4 ===
VTV

August 9

Alaska Milkmen 83, San Miguel Beermen 92
Pts: Devin Davis 26	Pts: Lamont Strothers 45
Series tied, 2-2

Cuneta Astrodome, Pasay

San Miguel grabbed their biggest lead of 20 points early in the third period. Strothers, Allan Caidic and Nelson Asaytono combined late in the fourth period to stop any attempt of an Alaska comeback.

=== Game 5 ===
VTV

August 11

Alaska Milkmen 92, San Miguel Beermen 84
Scoring by quarter: 22-14, 17-26, 20-13, 33-31
Pts: Devin Davis 35	Pts: Lamont Strothers 34
Alaska leads series, 3-2

Cuneta Astrodome, Pasay

From a 40-39 halftime edge for San Miguel, the Milkmen outscored the Beer, 20-13 in the third period for a 59-53 advantage going into the final quarter. Alaska pulled away in the final six minutes, taking a 15-point spread, 88-73, and put the game beyond doubt.

=== Game 6 ===
VTV

August 14

Alaska Milkmen 85, San Miguel Beermen 74
Scoring by quarter: 26-12, 18-23, 15-21, 26-18
Pts: Devin Davis 22	Pts: Lamont Strothers 34
Alaska wins series, 4-2

Araneta Coliseum, Quezon City

San Miguel scored the first six points of the contest when a 24-2 blast by Alaska gave them a huge 24-8 lead in the first quarter. The Milkmen went up by 21 points, 37-16, early in the second period, but the Beer rallied and tied the count for the last time at 59-all early in the fourth quarter. As the score reads 74-71 in favor of Alaska, Kenneth Duremdes spark a 6-0 run and iced the game for the Milkmen, 80-71. Kenneth Duremdes won on his second back-to-back finals MVP and Alaska captures on his ninth championship title.

1998 PBA Commissioners Cup champions

Alaska Milkmen
Ninth title

== Rosters ==
Alaska Milkmen roster
Players

Pos.	#	POB	Name	Height	Weight	DOB (YYYY–MM–DD)	From
F	4	(Philippines)	Braulio Lim	6 ft 3 in (1.91 m)			UE
G	5	(Philippines)	Gilbert Reyes	5 ft 8 in (1.73 m)			Ateneo
G/F	6	(Philippines)	Jojo Lastimosa	6 ft 1 in (1.85 m)			USJ–R
G	7	(Philippines)	Roehl Gomez	6 ft 0 in (1.83 m)			Cebu
G/F	9	(Philippines)	Rodney Santos	6 ft 2 in (1.88 m)			San Sebastian
C	12	(Philippines)	Dickie Bachmann	6 ft 5 in (1.96 m)			De La Salle
G	14	(Philippines)	Johnny Abarrientos	5 ft 8 in (1.73 m)			Far Eastern
F	15	(Philippines)	Albert David	6 ft 2 in (1.88 m)			Letran
F	16	(Philippines)	Bong Hawkins	6 ft 3 in (1.91 m)			UPHSD
C	17	(Philippines)	Kevin Ramas	6 ft 4 in (1.93 m)			Mapúa
F	19	(Philippines)	Kenneth Duremdes	6 ft 3 in (1.91 m)			Adamson
C	32	(Philippines)	Poch Juinio	6 ft 5 in (1.96 m)			Philippines
C	42	(United States)	Devin Davis (I)	6 ft 7 in (2.01 m)			Miami (OH)

Coaches

Head coach

- (United States) Tim Cone

Assistant coach(es)

- (Philippines) Richard Bachmann
- (Philippines) Gilbert Reyes

Legend

- (C) Team captain
- (I) Import
- Injured

San Miguel Beermen roster
Players

Pos.	#	POB	Name	Height	Weight	DOB (YYYY–MM–DD)	From
G	4	(Philippines)	Siot Tanquingcen	5 ft 9 in (1.75 m)			UST
C	5	(Philippines)	Ronilo Padilla	6 ft 5 in (1.96 m)			Cebu
G	7	(Philippines)	Michael Mustre	6 ft 0 in (1.83 m)			Letran
F	8	(Philippines)	Allan Caidic	6 ft 2 in (1.88 m)			UE
C	10	(Philippines)	Danny Ildefonso	6 ft 6 in (1.98 m)			National-U
F	11	(Philippines)	Nelson Asaytono	6 ft 3 in (1.91 m)			Manila
F	12	(Philippines)	Yves Dignadice	6 ft 4 in (1.93 m)			STI WNU
F	14	(Philippines)	Elpidio Villamin	6 ft 2 in (1.88 m)
G	15	(Philippines)	Edward Naron	6 ft 1 in (1.85 m)			Visayas
G	17	(Philippines)	Olsen Racela	5 ft 11 in (1.80 m)			Ateneo
F	18	(Philippines)	Art Dela Cruz	6 ft 2 in (1.88 m)			San Sebastian
F/C	25	(Philippines)	Freddie Abuda	6 ft 4 in (1.93 m)			Cebu
G/F	34	(United States)	William Antonio	6 ft 4 in (1.93 m)			Chaminade
G/F	42	(United States)	Lamont Strothers (I)	6 ft 3 in (1.91 m)			Christopher Newport

Coaches

Head coach

- (United States) Ron Jacobs

Assistant coach(es)

- (Philippines) Jong Uichico

Legend

- (C) Team captain
- (I) Import
- Injured

== Broadcast notes ==
Game	Play-by-play	Analyst
Game 1		
Game 2		
Game 3	Chino Trinidad	Alfrancis Chua
Game 4		
Game 5		
Game 6		
