= Golf at the 1990 Asian Games =

Sport played at the 1990 Asian Games

- Venue: Beijing Golf Club
- Dates: 24–27 September 1990

Golf was one of the many sports which was held at the 1990 Asian Games in Beijing Golf Club, Beijing, China between 24 and 27 September 1990.

Women's golf was included in the Asian Games program for the first time, with female golfers able to participate in two events, individual and team.

== Medalists ==
| Event | Gold | Silver | Bronze |
|---|---|---|---|
| Men's individual | Shigeki Maruyama; Japan | Nandasena Perera; Sri Lanka | Ramon Brobio; Philippines |
| Men's team | Japan; Katsunori Kuwabara; Shigeki Maruyama; Taro Okabe; Kazuyoshi Yonekura | Philippines; Ramon Brobio; Felix Casas; Vince Lauron; Danilo Zarate | South Korea; Ahn Joo-hwan; Han Young-kun; Min Hye-sik; Oh Jin-kun |
| Women's individual | Won Jae-sook; South Korea | Lee Jong-im; South Korea | Jamille Jose; Philippines |
| Women's team | South Korea; Lee Jong-im; Shin So-ra; Won Jae-sook; Yeom Sung-mi | Chinese Taipei; Huang Hui-fan; Huang Yu-chen; Lien Pay-fen; Tseng Hsiu-feng | Philippines; Ruby Chico; Yvette de Leon; Mary Grace Estuesta; Jamille Jose |

== Medal table ==
| Rank | Nation | Gold | Silver | Bronze | Total |
|---|---|---|---|---|---|
| 1 | South Korea (KOR) | 2 | 1 | 1 | 4 |
| 2 | Japan (JPN) | 2 | 0 | 0 | 2 |
| 3 | Philippines (PHI) | 0 | 1 | 3 | 4 |
| 4 | Chinese Taipei (TPE) | 0 | 1 | 0 | 1 |
| 4 | Sri Lanka (SRI) | 0 | 1 | 0 | 1 |
| Totals (5 entries) | | 4 | 4 | 4 | 12 |
