= 2003 Alaska Aces season =

- Head coach: Tim Cone
- General manager: Joaqui Trillo
- Owner: Fred Uytengsu

All-Filipino Cup results
- Record: 14–13 (51.9%)
- Place: 3rd
- Playoff finish: Semis (lost to TNT)

Invitational Cup results
- Record: 11–1 (91.7%)
- Place: 1st
- Playoff finish: Champions

Reinforced Conference results
- Record: 6–11 (35.3%)
- Place: N/A
- Playoff finish: QF (lost to Sta.Lucia)

Alaska Aces seasons

The 2003 Alaska Aces season was the 18th season of the franchise in the Philippine Basketball Association (PBA).

== Transactions ==
Players Added

Via Draft

- Mike Cortez
- Brandon Cablay
- Stephen Padilla

Via Free Agency

- Alvin Castro (From San Miguel Beermen)
- Richard Del Rosario (From Sta. Lucia Realtors)

Via Trade

- Don Camaso (From Talk 'N Text; traded their 10th pick to TNT)
- Eugene Tejada (Drafted by Sta.Lucia; the Aces traded their pick Leo Bat-Og in exchange)
Players Lost

Via Retirement

- Jojo Lastimosa

Via Free Agency

- Rodney Santos (To Purefoods TJ Hotdogs)

Via Trade

- Kenneth Duremdes (To Sta. Lucia Realtors; exchange for two draft picks)

== Occurrences ==
During the Invitational Cup, shooting guard Jon Ordonio was placed on the reserve list upon orders by the management. Ordonio was one of the five foreign-breed players whom the senate recommended for deportation upon investigation on the so-called Fil-Shams.

== Championship ==
The Alaska Aces won the Invitational Championship for their 11th PBA title as they exact revenge over the Coca-Cola Tigers, the team that beat them for the All-Filipino crown last year. The Aces won the best-of-three title series, two games to one. Alaska was the sixth entry among PBA teams qualified to play in the second conference Invitationals that featured guest foreign teams. They were on a nine-game winning streak going into Game One of the final playoffs.

== Roster ==
2003 Alaska Aces roster
Players

Pos.	#	POB	Name	Height	Weight	DOB (YYYY–MM–DD)	From
F	3	(United States)	Eugene Tejada	6 ft 5 in (1.96 m)			Chabot
F	5	(United States)	Robert Duat	6 ft 4 in (1.93 m)			Menlo
G	7	(United States)	Jon Ordonio	6 ft 2 in (1.88 m)			Master's
F	8	(Philippines)	Don Allado	6 ft 6 in (1.98 m)			De La Salle
G	9	(Philippines)	Stephen Padilla	5 ft 11 in (1.80 m)			Visayas
F	10	(Philippines)	Richard del Rosario	6 ft 5 in (1.96 m)			De La Salle
G	11	(Philippines)	Mike Cortez	6 ft 0 in (1.83 m)			De La Salle
G	13	(Philippines)	Alvin Castro	6 ft 3 in (1.91 m)			De La Salle
F	20	(Philippines)	Don Camaso	6 ft 6 in (1.98 m)			Metro Manila College
G	24	(United States)	Brandon Cablay	6 ft 0 in (1.83 m)			Vanguard
F	31	(United States)	John Arigo (C)	6 ft 4 in (1.93 m)			Tampa
C	32	(Philippines)	Edward Joseph Feihl	7 ft 1 in (2.16 m)			Adamson
C	34	(United States)	Ali Peek	6 ft 4 in (1.93 m)			Saint Mary's
F	41	(United States)	Miguel Noble	6 ft 5 in (1.96 m)			Utica
G	23	(United States)	Chris Carrawell (I)	6 ft 3 in (1.91 m)			Duke
G	22	(United States)	Isaac Fontaine (I)	6 ft 2 in (1.88 m)			Washington State

Coaches
Head coach
- (United States) Tim Cone
Assistant(s)
- (Philippines) Dickie Bachmann
- (Philippines) Gilbert Reyes
- (Philippines) Luigi Trillo
- (Philippines) Jojo Lastimosa
- (Philippines) Bobby Lotuaco
- (Philippines) Jun Reyes

Legend
- (DP) Unsigned draft pick
- (FA) Free agent
- (S) Suspended
- (I) Import
- Injured

== Game results ==
=== All-Filipino Cup ===
Date	Opponent	Score	Top scorer	Venue	Location
February 23	Sta.Lucia	91–82	Arigo (16 pts)	Araneta Coliseum	Quezon City
March 2	Talk 'N Text	96–78	Camaso (17 pts)	Araneta Coliseum	Quezon City
March 7	Brgy.Ginebra	95–91	Peek (24 pts)	Ynares Center	Antipolo City
March 9	Shell	85–80		Araneta Coliseum	Quezon City
March 15	FedEx	86–90			Bago City
March 19	San Miguel	76–81		Philsports Arena	Pasig
March 26	Red Bull	79–95		Makati Coliseum	Makati City
March 30	Coca-Cola	86–77		Araneta Coliseum	Quezon City
April 4	FedEx	95–93		Philsports Arena	Pasig
April 9	Brgy.Ginebra			Philsports Arena	Pasig
April 13	Purefoods			Philsports Arena	Pasig
April 23	Sta.Lucia	90–94		Philsports Arena	Pasig
April 26	San Miguel	69–78		Ynares Center	Antipolo City
April 30	Talk 'N Text	88–89		Makati Coliseum	Makati City
May 4	Shell	83–89		Araneta Coliseum	Quezon City
May 10	Red Bull	82–92			Tagbilaran, Bohol
May 18	Coca-Cola	87–90		Araneta Coliseum	Quezon City
May 25	Purefoods	90–85	Arigo (29 pts)	Araneta Coliseum	Quezon City

Win
Win via OT
loss
loss via OT
