= Devin Davis (basketball, born 1974) =

American-Spanish basketball player

Personal information
- Born: December 27, 1974 (age 51) Miami, Florida
- Listed height: 6 ft 7 in (2.01 m)
- Listed weight: 235 lb (107 kg)

Career information
- High school: Miami Senior (Miami, Florida)
- College: Miami (Ohio) (1993–1997)
- NBA draft: 1997: undrafted
- Playing career: 1997–2013
- Position: Power forward
- Number: 42, 5

Career history
- 1997–1998: Idaho Stampede
- 1998: Ciudad de Huelva
- 1998: Alaska Milkmen
- 1998–1999: Gran Canaria
- 1999: Alaska Milkmen
- 1999–2004: Leche Río Breogán
- 2004–2005: Dynamo Saint Petersburg
- 2005: Winterthur FC Barcelona
- 2005–2006: Forum Valladolid
- 2006–2007: Bruesa GBC
- 2007–2008: Leche Río Breogán
- 2010: Ayuda en Acción Fuenlabrada
- 2011: Estudiantes de Bahía Blanca
- 2012: Gimnasia Indalo
- 2012–2013: Estudiantes de Bahía Blanca

Career highlights
- 2× Liga ACB All-Star (2001, 2003); PBA champion (1998 Commissioners); CBA rebounding leader (1998); 3× First-team All-MAC (1995–1997); MAC tournament MVP (1997)

Devin Lavell Davis (born December 27, 1974) is an American/Spanish professional basketball player from Miami University in Ohio. He has played professionally in several leagues, including several seasons in Spain's Liga ACB.

== Career ==
A product of Miami Senior High School in Florida, Davis was an instant fan favorite as a Redskins freshman. As a senior in 1996–97, Davis steered Miami to a Mid-American Conference (MAC) championship, earning MVP honors in the tournament, according to Ultimate Sports Basketball Yearbook. Davis plays much bigger than his size but what makes him stand out is his devilish hair, he wears dreadlocks, short braids that stick out of his head like squirmy worms. In four years playing for the Miami University, Davis hit at a 15.4 ppg clip. He joined Chicago Bulls guard Ron Harper and former NBA center Wayne Embry as the only Redskins varsity players to finish their careers with at least 1,000 points and 1,000 rebounds.

Davis was the Idaho Stampede first round pick in the 1997 Continental Basketball Association draft, after his stint with Idaho, he played overseas in Spain, Philippines, and had stops in Russia, Mexico and Argentina. He won as the Best Import Award in the Philippines and won the Championship while playing with the Alaska Milkmen, averaging 28.5 pts and 11.3 rebounds per game.

== Coaching career ==
Davis was a Director of Player Development at the University of Dayton. He also was a strength and conditioning coach of the University of Alabama.

== Personal life ==
Devin got married in August 2015 to his wife Zarinah Davis.

Due to his stint in the Spain, Davis became fluent in Spanish and became a Spanish citizen.
