= Philippine Centennial Team =

Philippine basketball team competed in 1998 Asian Games

1998 Philippines Asian Games basketball team
- 1998 Asian Games: Bronze
Uniform
Uniform

The 1998 Philippines men's national basketball team, nicknamed the "Philippine Centennial Team", competed in the 1998 Asian Games. The team consisted of professional players in the country that included national team veterans Allan Caidic and Alvin Patrimonio, both sharing the distinction of being the only PBA players to represent the country in four Asian Games basketball tournaments since 1986. The team nickname was a reference to the centennial celebration of the independence of the Philippines.

The national team participated in the Philippine Basketball Association Centennial Cup (where they placed last, where other team had two non-Filipinos in their lineups) and later played exhibition games against the China national basketball team and the PBA All-Star (non-national team members) Selection. The Nationals went on to win the 21st William Jones Cup International Basketball Tournament in Taiwan and then on a tough Midwest tour of the United States. The national team’s main goal was to win the 1998 Asian Games basketball tournament and to reclaim Philippine basketball supremacy in Asia. The team started the tournament by winning four games in a row and finished with a 5-2 record losing to China and Korea, but they were able to capture the Bronze medal in the play-offs.

Overall, the national basketball achievements of 1998 include the William Jones Cup and the Asian Games bronze medal. This team was the third PBA-backed national team that followed the 1994 national team (finished fourth) and the 1990 national team (finished second – Silver Medal), and preceded the 2002 national team that finished fourth in the Asian Games and eventually the 2022 Team that finally won the first Gold Medal since 1962 with Cone coaching the same team.

== Tournaments ==
Medal record

Men's basketball

Asian Games
| Bronze medal – third place | 1998 Bangkok | Team competition |

=== 1998 Philippine Basketball Association All-Star Games ===
| Date | Opponents | Scores | W/L |
|---|---|---|---|
| July 9 | (Philippines) PBA All-Star Selection | 114-109 (50-45) | W |
| July 12 | (Philippines) PBA All-Star Selection | 107-92 (54-45) | W |

=== 1998 William Jones Cup ===
| Date | Opponents | Scores | W/L | Round |
|---|---|---|---|---|
| August 30 | Saudi Arabia | 78-60 (48-32) | W | Elimination Round Group B |
| September 1 | Japan | 90-87 OT ((76-76)) (44-39) | W | Elimination Round Group B |
| September 2 | Thailand | 84-34 (41-17) | W | Elimination Round Group B |
| September 3 | Costa Rica | 83-72 (46-42) | W | Elimination Round Group B |
| September 4 | South Korea | 96-77 (44-39) | W | Semi-Finals |
| September 5 | Chinese Taipei | 82-72 (41-40) | W | Championship |

- Halftime scores in parentheses
- Regulation Scores in double parentheses
- Record: 6-0

=== 1998 PBA Centennial Cup ===
| Date | Opponents | Scores | W/L | Round |
|---|---|---|---|---|
| September 8 | (Philippines) San Miguel Beermen | 50-60 (20-33) | L | Elimination Round |
| September 11 | (Philippines) Ginebra San Miguel | 72-89 (44-40) | L | Elimination Round |
| September 15 | (Philippines) Mobiline Phone Pals | 50-65 (20-30) | L | Elimination Round |
| September 18 | (Philippines) Purefoods Tender Juicy Hotdogs | 59-79 | L | Elimination Round |
| September 20 | (Philippines) Alaska Milkmen | 57-85 (27-42) | L | Elimination Round |
| September 26 | (Philippines) Sta. Lucia Realtors | 78-72 (36-39) | W | Elimination Round |
| September 29 | (Philippines) Shell Turbo Chargers | 57-73 (19-35) | L | Elimination Round |
| October 2 | (Philippines) Pop Cola 800's | 58-75 (33-44) | L | Elimination Round |

=== 1998 Asian Games ===
| Date | Opponents | Scores | W/L | Round |
|---|---|---|---|---|
| December 8 | Kazakhstan | 53-52 (27-28) | W | Elimination Round Group |
| December 9 | Kyrgyzstan | 91-50 (41-27) | W | Elimination Round Group |
| December 14 | United Arab Emirates | 93-57 (49-29) | W | Quarterfinals Group B |
| December 15 | Thailand | 86-60 (36-36) | W | Quarterfinals Group B |
| December 16 | South Korea | 83-103 (36-49) | L | Quarterfinals Group B |
| December 18 | China | 73-82 (32-44) | L | Semi-Final |
| December 19 | Kazakhstan | 73-68 (36-36) | W | Bronze medal game |

- Halftime scores in parentheses
- Record: 5-2

== Members ==
| Pos | No. | Player | Height | PBA Team |
|---|---|---|---|---|
| PF | 4 | Alvin Patrimonio | 6'4" | Purefoods |
| C | 5 | Andy Seigle | 6'10" | Mobiline |
| SG | 6 | Jojo Lastimosa | 6'2" | Alaska |
| PF | 7 | Dennis Espino | 6'6" | Sta. Lucia |
| SG | 8 | Allan Caidic | 6'3" | San Miguel |
| PF | 9 | Jun Limpot | 6'6" | Sta. Lucia |
| SG/SF | 10 | Vergel Meneses | 6'4" | Pop Cola |
| C | 11 | Edward Joseph Feihl | 7'1" | Purefoods |
| PG | 12 | Olsen Racela | 5'10" | San Miguel |
| C | 13 | Marlou Aquino | 6'9" | Ginebra |
| PG | 14 | Johnny Abarrientos | 5'7" | Alaska |
| SG/SF | 15 | Kenneth Duremdes | 6'3" | Alaska |

- Head coach: Tim Cone (Alaska)
- Assistant coach: Chot Reyes (MBA)
- Assistant coach: Aric del Rosario (MBA, UST)
- Team Manager: Joaqui Trillo (Alaska)
- Team Scout: Jeffrey Cariaso (Mobiline)

== Milestones ==
- Allan Caidic and Alvin Patrimonio both have the rare distinction of having participated in four straight Asian Games basketball tournaments since 1986. They donned the national team colors in the 1986, 1990, 1994 and 1998.
- Caidic also became the only Filipino player to win two championships in the William Jones Cup, once as an amateur in 1985 and once as a professional in 1998.
- Jojo Lastimosa was also a member of the 1986 Philippine team that won the bronze medal in the 1986 Asian Games.
- Johnny Abarrientos, Kenneth Duremdes and Marlou Aquino played on their second Asian Games tournament.
- In 1998, the Philippines won its third William Jones Cup title – the first two on 1981 and 1985.
