= Lastimosa =

Lastimosa is a surname. Notable people with the surname include:

- Carlo Lastimosa (born 1990), Filipino basketball player
- Jojo Lastimosa (born 1964), Filipino basketball player
- Leo Lastimosa (born 1964), Filipino journalist
- Mary Jean Lastimosa (born 1987), Filipino host and Binibining Pilipinas Universe 2014
