= Basketball at the 1990 Asian Games – Men's tournament =

Men at the 1990 Asian Games
- Venue: Capital Indoor Stadium
- Date: 23 September – 6 October 1990
- Nations: 11

Medalists
gold medal	China
silver medal	Philippines
bronze medal	South Korea

The 1990 Men's Asian Games Basketball Tournament was held in China from September 23, 1990, to October 6, 1990.

== Results ==
=== Preliminary round ===
==== Group A ====
Pos	Team	Pld	W	L	PF	PA	PD	Pts	Qualification
1	China	2	2	0	228	125	+103	4	Quarterfinals / Group I–II
2	Iran	2	1	1	153	168	−15	3	Quarterfinals / Group I–II
3	Hong Kong	2	0	2	137	225	−88	2	Quarterfinals / Group III–IV

Source: Results

24 September

Hong Kong	79–86	Iran
Scoring by half: 35–47, 44–39

Capital Indoor Stadium, Beijing

25 September

China	89–67	Iran
Scoring by half: 47–36, 42–31

Capital Indoor Stadium, Beijing

27 September

China	139–58	Hong Kong
Scoring by half: 63–31, 76–27

Capital Indoor Stadium, Beijing

==== Group B ====
Pos	Team	Pld	W	L	PF	PA	PD	Pts	Qualification
1	South Korea	2	2	0	227	168	+59	4	Quarterfinals / Group I–II
2	North Korea	2	1	1	174	193	−19	3	Quarterfinals / Group I–II
3	Saudi Arabia	2	0	2	160	200	−40	2	Quarterfinals / Group III–IV

Source: Results

23 September

South Korea	116–78	Saudi Arabia
Scoring by half: 61–38, 55–40

Capital Indoor Stadium, Beijing

25 September

South Korea	111–90	North Korea
Scoring by half: 46–50, 65–40

Capital Indoor Stadium, Beijing

26 September

Saudi Arabia	82–84	North Korea
Scoring by half: 42–37, 40–47

Capital Indoor Stadium, Beijing

==== Group C ====
Pos	Team	Pld	W	L	PF	PA	PD	Pts	Qualification
1	Philippines	2	2	0	215	159	+56	4	Quarterfinals / Group I–II
2	Japan	2	1	1	185	143	+42	3	Quarterfinals / Group I–II
3	Pakistan	2	0	2	138	236	−98	2	Quarterfinals / Group III–IV

Source: Results

25 September

Japan	107–57	Pakistan
Scoring by half: 50–31, 57–26

Capital Indoor Stadium, Beijing

26 September

Philippines	129–81	Pakistan
Scoring by half: 67–43, 62–38

Capital Indoor Stadium, Beijing

27 September

Philippines	86–78	Japan
Scoring by half: 29–43, 57–35

Capital Indoor Stadium, Beijing

==== Group D ====
Pos	Team	Pld	W	L	PF	PA	PD	Pts	Qualification
1	Chinese Taipei	1	1	0	68	60	+8	2	Quarterfinals / Group I–II
2	United Arab Emirates	1	0	1	60	68	−8	1	Quarterfinals / Group I–II

Source: Results

28 September

Chinese Taipei	68–60	United Arab Emirates
Scoring by half: 36–32, 32–28

Capital Indoor Stadium, Beijing

=== Quarterfinals ===
==== Group I ====
Pos	Team	Pld	W	L	PF	PA	PD	Pts	Qualification
1	China	3	3	0	349	218	+131	6	Semifinals
2	Philippines	3	2	1	238	282	−44	5	Semifinals
3	United Arab Emirates	3	1	2	233	258	−25	4	5th place game
4	North Korea	3	0	3	243	305	−62	3	7th place game

Source: Results

29 September

China	104–71	United Arab Emirates
Scoring by half: 48–35, 56–36

Capital Indoor Stadium, Beijing

30 September

Philippines	98–82	North Korea
Scoring by half: 50–40, 48–42

Capital Indoor Stadium, Beijing

1 October

North Korea	74–87	United Arab Emirates
Scoring by half: 30–44, 44–43

Capital Indoor Stadium, Beijing

1 October

China	125–60	Philippines
Scoring by half: 56–28, 69–32

Capital Indoor Stadium, Beijing

2 October

Philippines	80–75	United Arab Emirates
Scoring by half: 42–55, 38–20

Capital Indoor Stadium, Beijing

2 October

China	120–87	North Korea
Scoring by half: 65–50, 55–37

Capital Indoor Stadium, Beijing

==== Group II ====
Pos	Team	Pld	W	L	PF	PA	PD	Pts	Qualification
1	Japan	3	2	1	229	224	+5	5 (Note: Head-to-head result: JPN 94–91 KOR.)	Semifinals
2	South Korea	3	2	1	291	266	+25	5	Semifinals
3	Chinese Taipei	3	1	2	223	218	+5	4 (Note: Head-to-head result: TPE 77–66 IRN.)	5th place game
4	Iran	3	1	2	225	260	−35	4	7th place game

Source: Results
Notes:

29 September

South Korea	91–94	Japan
Scoring by half: 53–36, 38–58

Capital Indoor Stadium, Beijing

30 September

Chinese Taipei	77–66	Iran
Scoring by half: 40–33, 37–33

Capital Indoor Stadium, Beijing

1 October

South Korea	87–84	Chinese Taipei
Scoring by half: 50–47, 37–37

Capital Indoor Stadium, Beijing

1 October

Iran	71–70	Japan
Scoring by half: 36–34, 35–36

Capital Indoor Stadium, Beijing

2 October

South Korea	113–88	Iran
Scoring by half: 55–35, 58–53

Capital Indoor Stadium, Beijing

2 October

Chinese Taipei	62–65	Japan
Scoring by half: 23–35, 39–30

Capital Indoor Stadium, Beijing

==== Group III ====
Pos	Team	Pld	W	L	PF	PA	PD	Pts	Qualification
1	Pakistan	1	1	0	80	74	+6	2	9th place game
2	Hong Kong	1	0	1	74	80	−6	1	

Source: Results

1 October

Hong Kong	74–80	Pakistan
Scoring by half: 38–41, 36–39

Capital Indoor Stadium, Beijing

==== Group IV ====
Pos	Team	Pld	W	L	PF	PA	PD	Pts	Qualification
1	Saudi Arabia	0	0	0	0	0	0	0	9th place game

Source: Results

=== Classification 5th–10th ===
==== 9th place game ====
5 October

Pakistan	75–103	Saudi Arabia
Scoring by half: 44–54, 31–49

Capital Indoor Stadium, Beijing

==== 7th place game ====
5 October

North Korea	71–88	Iran
Scoring by half: 34–51, 37–37

Capital Indoor Stadium, Beijing

==== 5th place game ====
5 October

United Arab Emirates	81–105	Chinese Taipei
Scoring by half: 36–52, 45–53

Capital Indoor Stadium, Beijing

=== Final round ===
Semifinals
4 October
China	92
South Korea	88
4 October
Japan	90
Philippines	94

Gold medal game
6 October
China	90
Philippines	76
Bronze medal game
6 October
South Korea	99
Japan	74

==== Semifinals ====
4 October

China	92–88	South Korea
Scoring by half: 37–44, 55–44

Capital Indoor Stadium, Beijing

4 October

Japan	90–94	Philippines
Scoring by half: 50–45, 40–49

Capital Indoor Stadium, Beijing

==== Bronze medal game ====
6 October

South Korea	99–74	Japan
Scoring by half: 55–32, 44–42

Capital Indoor Stadium, Beijing

==== Gold medal game ====
6 October

China	90–76	Philippines
Scoring by half: 53–35, 37–41

Capital Indoor Stadium, Beijing

== Final standing ==
Rank	Team	Pld	W	L
1st place, gold medalist(s)	China	7	7	0
2nd place, silver medalist(s)	Philippines	7	5	2
3rd place, bronze medalist(s)	South Korea	7	5	2
4	Japan	7	3	4
5	Chinese Taipei	5	3	2
6	United Arab Emirates	5	1	4
7	Iran	6	3	3
8	North Korea	6	1	5
9	Saudi Arabia	3	1	2
10	Pakistan	4	1	3
11	Hong Kong	3	0	3
