= Shigeki Maruyama =

Japanese professional golfer

Shigeki Maruyama 丸山茂樹
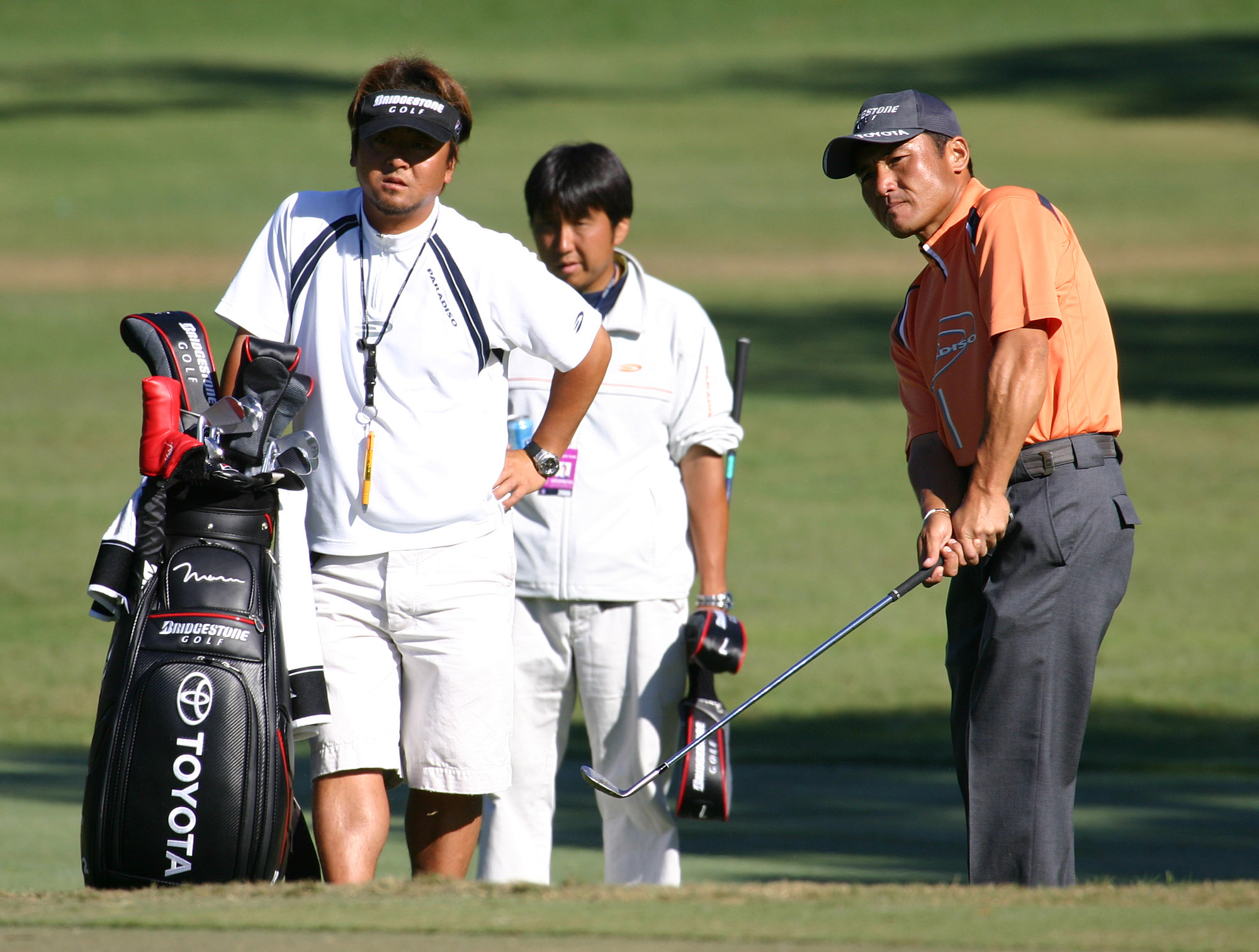

Personal information
- Nickname: The Smiling Assassin
- Nationality: Japan
- Born: 12 September 1969 (age 57) Ichikawa, Chiba, Japan
- Height: 1.69 m (5 ft 7 in)
- Weight: 73 kg (161 lb; 11.5 st)

Career
- Sport: Golf
- College: Nihon University
- Turned professional: 1992
- Former tours: PGA Tour; Japan Golf Tour
- Professional wins: 14
- Highest ranking: 19 (21 March 2004)

Number of wins by tour
- PGA Tour: 3
- Japan Golf Tour: 10
- Other: 1

Best results in major championships
- Masters Tournament: T14: 2002
- PGA Championship: T22: 2001
- U.S. Open: T4: 2004
- The Open Championship: T5: 2002
Medal record
Asian Games
Gold medal – first place	1990 Beijing	Men's individual
Gold medal – first place	1990 Beijing	Men's team

Shigeki Maruyama (丸山茂樹, Maruyama Shigeki; born 12 September 1969) is a Japanese professional golfer.

== Career ==
Maruyama was born in Ichikawa, Japan, near Tokyo. He attended Nihon University.

In 1992, he turned professional. He is known for his ever-present smile on the golf course which has given rise to his nickname of the "Smiling Assassin." He began his career on the Japan Golf Tour, quickly becoming one of the leading players on that tour. Two excellent finishes in World Golf Championships events in 1999 helped to earn him membership of the U.S.-based PGA Tour for the 2000 season. He has three PGA Tour victories. At the end of the 2008 season he announced he was returning to Japan after failing to maintain full playing rights on the PGA Tour.

Maruyama was a member of The International Team in the Presidents Cup in 1998 and 2000. He had a 5–0–0 win–loss–tie record in the 1998 matches.

He has featured in the top 20 of the Official World Golf Ranking.

On 5 June 2000, he shot a first round 58 at Woodmont Country Club (South Course) in Rockville, Maryland while qualifying for the 2000 U.S. Open. This round ties the score achieved by Jim Furyk on the final round of the Travelers Championship on 2016.

== Amateur wins ==
- 1990 Asian Games

== Professional wins (14) ==
=== PGA Tour wins (3) ===
No.	Date	Tournament	Winning score	Margin of victory	Runner-up
1	15 Jul 2001	Greater Milwaukee Open	−18 (68-65-67-66=266)	Playoff	(United States) Charles Howell III
2	12 May 2002	Verizon Byron Nelson Classic	−14 (67-63-68-68=266)	3 strokes	(United States) Ben Crane
3	19 Oct 2003	Chrysler Classic of Greensboro	−22 (65-64-70-67=266)	5 strokes	(United States) Brad Faxon

PGA Tour playoff record (1–0)

No.	Year	Tournament	Opponent	Result
1	2001	Greater Milwaukee Open	(United States) Charles Howell III	Won with birdie on first extra hole

=== Japan Golf Tour wins (10) ===
Legend
Japan majors (1)
Other Japan Golf Tour (9)

No.	Date	Tournament	Winning score	Margin of victory	Runner(s)-up
1	23 May 1993	Pepsi Ube Kosan Open	−20 (63-72-63-66=264)	2 strokes	(United States) Todd Hamilton
2	22 Oct 1995	Bridgestone Open	−14 (66-70-67-71=274)	3 strokes	(United States) Mark Calcavecchia, (Japan) Masashi Ozaki, (Japan) Shinichi Yokota
3	20 Oct 1996	Bridgestone Open (2)	−16 (67-67-67-71=272)	2 strokes	(United States) Brian Watts
4	18 May 1997	Japan PGA Championship	−16 (68-68-69-67=272)	2 strokes	(Japan) Shusaku Sugimoto
5	22 Jun 1997	Yomiuri Open	−17 (67-68-66-66=267)	2 strokes	(Japan) Naomichi Ozaki
6	7 Sep 1997	Japan PGA Match-Play Championship Promise Cup	3 and 2		(United States) Peter Teravainen
7	7 Dec 1997	Golf Nippon Series Hitachi Cup	−16 (70-63-68-67=268)	2 strokes	(Japan) Tateo Ozaki
8	5 Jul 1998	PGA Philanthropy Tournament	−20 (65-66-64-69=264)	1 stroke	(Japan) Satoshi Higashi
9	24 Oct 1999	Bridgestone Open (3)	−20 (66-68-66-68=268)	5 strokes	(Japan) Toshimitsu Izawa
10	6 Dec 2009	Golf Nippon Series JT Cup (2)	−9 (70-67-70-64=271)	Playoff	(South Korea) Kim Kyung-tae

Japan Golf Tour playoff record (1–0)

No.	Year	Tournament	Opponent	Result
1	2009	Golf Nippon Series JT Cup	(South Korea) Kim Kyung-tae	Won with par on fourth extra hole

=== Other wins (1) ===
Legend
World Golf Championships (1)
Other wins (0)

No.	Date	Tournament	Winning score	Margin of victory	Runner-up
1	15 Dec 2002	WGC-World Cup (with (Japan) Toshimitsu Izawa)	−36 (64-64-58-66=252)	2 strokes	United States − Phil Mickelson and David Toms

== Results in major championships ==
Tournament	1996	1997	1998	1999
Masters Tournament			CUT	T31
U.S. Open				
The Open Championship	T14	T10	T29	CUT
PGA Championship		T23	T65	CUT

Tournament	2000	2001	2002	2003	2004	2005	2006
Masters Tournament	T46	CUT	T14	CUT	CUT	CUT	CUT
U.S. Open	CUT		T16	CUT	T4	T33	
The Open Championship	T55	CUT	T5	CUT	T30	CUT	
PGA Championship	T46	T22	T43	T48	CUT	CUT	CUT

Top 10
Did not play

CUT = missed the half-way cut
"T" = tied

=== Summary ===
Tournament	Wins	2nd	3rd	Top-5	Top-10	Top-25	Events	Cuts made
Masters Tournament	0	0	0	0	0	1	9	3
U.S. Open	0	0	0	1	1	2	5	3
The Open Championship	0	0	0	1	2	3	10	6
PGA Championship	0	0	0	0	0	2	10	6
Totals	0	0	0	2	3	8	34	18

- Most consecutive cuts made – 5 (2001 PGA – 2002 PGA)
- Longest streak of top-10s – 1 (three times)

== Results in The Players Championship ==
Tournament	1998	1999	2000	2001	2002	2003	2004	2005	2006	2007	2008
The Players Championship	CUT	CUT	WD		T14	T45	T53	T32	WD	CUT	WD

Did not play

CUT = missed the halfway cut
WD = withdrew
"T" indicates a tie for a place.

== Results in World Golf Championships ==
Tournament	1999	2000	2001	2002	2003	2004	2005	2006	2007	2008	2009	2010
Championship		T50	NT^{1}	WD		T16	T11					
Match Play	QF	R16	QF		R32	R64	R64	R32				
Invitational	6	T15	T31	T36		T27	T46					
Champions												WD

^{1}Cancelled due to 9/11

Top 10
Did not play

QF, R16, R32, R64 = Round in which player lost in match play
WD = withdrew
"T" = tied
Note that the HSBC Champions did not become a WGC event until 2009.

== Team appearances ==
Amateur

- Eisenhower Trophy (representing Japan): 1990

Professional

- Presidents Cup (representing the International team): 1998 (winners), 2000
- World Cup (representing Japan): 2000, 2001, 2002 (winners), 2003, 2004
- Dynasty Cup (representing Japan): 2005

== See also ==
- List of golfers with most Japan Golf Tour wins
