= Mike Tolomia =

Filipino basketball player

Free agent
- Position: Point guard / shooting guard

Personal information
- Born: January 6, 1993 (age 33) Zamboanga City, Philippines
- Listed height: 5 ft 11 in (1.80 m)
- Listed weight: 180 lb (82 kg)

Career information
- High school: FEU-FERN (Quezon City)
- College: FEU (2011–2015)
- PBA draft: 2016: Special draft
- Drafted by: Rain or Shine Elasto Painters
- Playing career: 2016–present

Career history
- 2016–2017: Rain or Shine Elasto Painters
- 2017–2019: Meralco Bolts
- 2019–2021: Blackwater Elite/Bossing
- 2021–2022: Alaska Aces
- 2022–2023: Converge FiberXers
- 2023: Zamboanga Valientes
- 2023–2024: TNT Tropang Giga
- 2024: Manila Stars

Career highlights
- PBA All-Star (2017); UAAP champion (2015); 2x PBA D-League Champions (2016 Aspirant's, 2016 Foundation); PBA D-League Most Valuable Player (2016 Foundation)

Cris Michael Solis Tolomia (born January 6, 1993) is a Filipino professional basketball player. He won a UAAP championship with the FEU Tamaraws.

== College career ==
=== Seasons 74–76 ===
Tolomia first played for the FEU Tamaraws in Season 74. In a game against the UST Growling Tigers in his rookie season, he had 10 points, six rebounds, three assists, two steals and the game-winning three pointer in his 24 minutes of play. In the playoffs, he scored 13 of his 19 points in the second half to help send FEU to the Finals where they would face Ateneo. In Season 76, he scored 16 points against the Ateneo Blue Eagles. That season, the Tamaraws had a chance to make the Finals, but were beaten by the La Salle Green Archers. La Salle went on to win that season.

=== Season 77 ===
After Season 76, FEU lost its lead guards RR Garcia and Terrence Romeo, to graduation and to the PBA Draft respectively. With them gone, Tolomia became the leader of the team. Before the start of Season 77, he was able to lead his team to the quarterfinals of the Filoil Flying V Preseason Cup and the title in a mini-tournament in Cebu. In their Season 77 debut, he scored 20 of his 23 points in the second half to lead the Tamaraws to an upset win over the Archers. He then scored 14 points in a loss to UST. FEU then bounced back with a win over the UP Fighting Maroons, in which he scored 18 and had three assists. He then had 15 points against Ateneo, but missed a game-tying triple at the buzzer that resulted in FEU losing. To end the first round of eliminations, he fired 21 points in 21 minutes for a win over the Adamson Falcons. With the win, FEU created a three-way tie with La Salle and the NU Bulldogs for the 2nd spot, with Ateneo leading the UAAP in the standings.

When the second round began, FEU beat NU with Tolomia going for 18 points and 5 assists. They then beat the Archers again, despite him spending three days in the days in the hospital for fever and tonsilitis and being discharged just the day before the match. In that game, he scored 22 points and snapped the Archers' seven-game winning streak. For that performance and for scoring 19 in a win over UP, he won Player of the Week honors. He then had a sub-par performance against Ateneo, in which he only scored 10 points on 3-of-16 from the field and a woeful 3-of-10 from the free throw line, including free throws that could have won the game for FEU and secured 1st seed.

Tolomia was able to redeem himself in the playoff for the 2nd seed against La Salle, as he scored 19 points and got FEU the twice-to-beat advantage. However, the following game, he only had seven points on 2-of-14 shooting, resulting in La Salle sending the series into sudden death. In Game 2, he made the game-winning assist to Mac Belo for a wide open three-pointer, sending FEU back to the Finals for the first time since 2011, where they would face the Bulldogs. In the Finals, FEU won Game 1, as he had 15 points to lead the team. However, the Bulldogs went on to win the next two games, denying FEU the championship while ending a 60-year title drought for NU.

=== Season 78 ===
For Season 78, Tolomia played more as a point guard than as a two guard. He scored 17 in a blowout win over Ateneo to start their season. In their next game however, which was against UST, he had only eight points and 10 turnovers as FEU lost. He then bounced back with 20 points with three triples and five assists in a win over La Salle. In a Finals rematch with NU, he had 19 points with three triples (with two of them in the clutch) as FEU got its revenge. He had no points, but nine rebounds and five assists before spraining his left ankle against the UE Red Warriors. He was able to play limited minutes as FEU won its 9th straight game. The nine-game streak however would be broken by UST, despite Tolomia scoring 17. The Tamaraws finished the elimination rounds as the 2nd seed.

FEU got into the Finals once again, this time against UST. In Game 1, Tolomia had 14 points and sparked a 14–2 run in the final six minutes for FEU to pull away with the win. However, in Game 2, his performance hurt the team, as he had just seven points on 0-of-15 shooting from the field and six turnovers. In contrast, UST's Kevin Ferrer had 29 points (with 24 of them in the third quarter) as UST forced a winner-take-all Game 3. Still, Coach Nash Racela had faith that Tolomia and the team would bounce back. In Game 3, he made a clutch shot that helped put FEU ahead by three. FEU eventually won the game and won their first title in a decade. He finished with 13 points, but shot 4 for 17. This was his final year with FEU, as he had used up his playing years.

For his achievements, he was awarded "Super Senior" along with San Beda's Baser Amer, and Letran's Mark Cruz at the Collegiate Basketball Awards. Several years later, he graduated from FEU with a Bachelor of Science in Sports and Recreational Management degree.

== Amateur career ==
Tolomia played in the PBA D-League from 2013 up to when he was drafted to the PBA. In the 2016 Aspirant's Cup, he had his first triple-double of his career, with 22 points, 10 rebounds, and 10 assists in a win over the AMA Online Education Titans. His team won the title that conference. In the following conference, he had another triple-double, this time with 23 points, 10 rebounds, and 10 assists against AMA once again. Later on, he won the first-ever PBA D-League MVP and claimed the title in the 2016 Foundation Cup.

== Professional career ==
=== Rain or Shine Elasto Painters (2016–2017) ===
Tolomia was selected in the special draft of the 2016 PBA draft by the Rain or Shine Elasto Painters. He was Rain or Shine's only pick in that draft. His new coach, Caloy Garcia, expected him to take the place of Paul Lee. In his PBA debut, he scored 11 points, four rebounds and two assists in 15 minutes. He scored 14 points against the Blackwater Elite to help Rain or Shine make the quarterfinals. He made the 2017 All-Star Game as a member of Gilas. Against the Alaska Aces in the Commissioner's Cup, he scored nine points in the fourth quarter and three assists. However, he committed a costly turnover late in the game when he dribbled off his foot, allowing Alaska to seal the win. He still impressed Alaska's Jvee Casio and head coach Alex Compton. In the Governors' Cup, he made the assist that gave James Yap his 10,000th point.

=== Meralco Bolts (2017–2019) ===
On August 7, 2017, Tolomia was traded to the Meralco Bolts for Ed Daquioag. Head coach Norman Black did the trade because Meralco needed more point guards while they had many two guards. In his fourth game with the Bolts, he had a career-high 24 points on five three-pointers against Alaska. In the Governors' Cup quarterfinals, he missed a game-winning basket at the buzzer, allowing Blackwater to upset them for Game 1. Meralco eventually moved on to the semis, where he was fined P5,000 for a flagrant foul against the Star Hotshot's Jio Jalalon. Meralco went as far as the Finals that conference, where they lost to Barangay Ginebra in seven games.

In the 2017–18 Philippine Cup, Tolomia scored 21 points, six assists and four rebounds off the bench in a loss to the San Miguel Beermen. During the 2018 Governors' Cup, his conference-high was 17 points, which he scored in a win over Rain or Shine.

In 2019, Tolomia played in the Rookies/Sophomores vs Juniors game during the 2019 PBA All-Star Weekend.

=== Blackwater Elite (2019–2021) ===
On October 25, 2019, Tolomia, along with KG Canaleta and two second-round draft picks in 2020 and 2022, was traded to the Blackwater Elite for Allein Maliksi and Raymar Jose. Head coach Aries Dimaunahan believed both players could impact the team. He debuted with only two points in a loss to Alaska.

On November 27, 2019, Tolomia's former head coach at FEU, Nash Racela, became the head coach for Blackwater, replacing Dimaunahan. This completed a mini-reunion of FEU alumni at Blackwater, with Mac Belo and Carl Bryan Cruz also on the team. Richard Escoto, Hubert Cani, and Ron Dennison, who were also Tolomia's teammates at FEU, later joined Blackwater. In the 2020 season, he had 10 points and seven assists in a loss to Alaska. He then had 17 points in a loss to SMB, but missed a three-pointer that could have won them the game. Stats-wise, he had a good season as he averaged 8.2 points, 2.5 rebounds, 2.2 assists, and 1.1 steals in 21.9 minutes.

In the 2021 PBA season opener against Alaska, Tolomia tried to spark a comeback win, but Alaska came out with the win. He then scored a game-high 22 points in a loss to Ginebra. Blackwater kept on losing that season, and got their 19th straight loss from Meralco, breaking a PBA all-time record for most consecutive losses. Before he was traded, he was averaging a career-best 11.7 points, 3.1 rebounds, and 2.4 assists.

=== Alaska Aces (2021–2022) ===
On October 13, 2021, Tolomia, along with a 2022 second-round pick, was traded to the Alaska Aces for JVee Casio and Barkley Eboña. He was notified of the trade just before practice with Blackwater. Head coach Jeffrey Cariaso liked his scoring. In the 2021 Governors' Cup playoffs, he scored 10 points in the third quarter to extend their series against the NLEX Road Warriors. They were eliminated the following game, as he had 11 points and no one scored more than 15.

=== Converge FiberXers (2022–2023) ===
In May 2022, Tolomia signed with the Converge FiberXers, the new team that took over the defunct Alaska Aces franchise. He led Converge in points in a close loss against the TNT Tropang Giga with 17. He became a free agent after the 2022–23 PBA season after being left unsigned.

=== TNT Tropang Giga (2023–2024) ===
In November 2023, Tolomia signed a one-conference contract with the TNT Tropang Giga. Prior to signing with the Tropang Giga, he had a stint with the Zamboanga Valientes of the Pilipinas VisMin Super Cup during the 2023 Fiesta Pilar Cup.

=== Manila Stars (2024) ===
In April 2024, Tolomia moved to the Maharlika Pilipinas Basketball League as he joined as Manila Stars.

== Career statistics ==
Legend
GP	Games played	MPG	Minutes per game
FG%	Field-goal percentage	3P%	3-point field-goal percentage	FT%	Free-throw percentage
RPG	Rebounds per game	APG	Assists per game	SPG	Steals per game
BPG	Blocks per game	PPG	Points per game	**Bold**	Career high

As of the end of 2023–24 season

=== PBA season-by-season averages ===
Year	Team	GP	MPG	FG%	3P%	FT%	RPG	APG	SPG	BPG	PPG
2016–17	Rain or Shine	**38**	11.6	**.404**	**.348**	**.853**	1.2	1.0	.2	—	4.7
2016–17	Meralco	**38**	11.6	**.404**	**.348**	**.853**	1.2	1.0	.2	—	4.7
2017–18	Meralco	35	13.6	.355	.337	.758	1.9	1.4	.3	**.1**	5.3
2019	Meralco	22	10.7	.337	.174	.467	1.1	1.2	.3	—	3.5
2019	Blackwater	22	10.7	.337	.174	.467	1.1	1.2	.3	—	3.5
2020	Blackwater	11	**21.9**	.310	.190	.571	**2.5**	**2.2**	**1.1**	—	8.2
2021	Blackwater	22	18.4	.369	.254	.746	2.3	2.0	.5	.0	**8.5**
2021	Alaska	22	18.4	.369	.254	.746	2.3	2.0	.5	.0	**8.5**
2022–23	Converge	23	8.6	.312	.235	.429	.9	1.0	.3	.0	2.6
2023–24	TNT	6	9.0	.313	.200	—	1.2	1.0	—	—	2.0
Career		157	13.1	.354	.272	.711	1.5	1.3	.3	.0	5.0

=== College ===
==== Elimination rounds ====
Year	Team	GP	MPG	FG%	3P%	FT%	RPG	APG	SPG	BPG	PPG
2011–12	FEU	**14**	21.6	.282	.209	.517	3.6	1.5	**.5**	**.1**	5.9
2012–13	FEU	10	17.1	.318	.161	.692	1.6	1.5	.4	.0	5.6
2013–14	FEU	**14**	24.7	.306	.231	.696	**4.8**	3.6	.5	**.1**	9.4
2014–15	FEU	**14**	**28.0**	**.400**	.230	.597	4.4	3.4	.4	.0	**15.2**
2015–16	FEU	**14**	23.8	**.400**	**.309**	.846	4.7	**4.0**	.1	**.1**	12.4
Career		66	23.4	.352	.238	.661	4.0	2.9	.4	.1	10.0

==== Playoffs ====
Year	Team	GP	MPG	FG%	3P%	FT%	RPG	APG	SPG	BPG	PPG
2013–14	FEU	2	20.0	.111	.077	**1.000**	2.5	3.0	.5	.0	4.5
2014–15	FEU	**6**	**32.0**	**.356**	**.205**	.500	**5.0**	3.0	**1.1**	**.3**	**15.5**
2015–16	FEU	4	27.4	.217	.115	.857	**5.0**	**3.3**	.0	.0	11.8
Career		12	28.5	.286	.157	.711	6.0	3.1	.8	.2	12.4

== National team career ==
At 17 years old, Tolomia competed in the 2010 Summer Youth Olympic Games in Singapore in the boy's 3x3 basketball event. His team finished 9th out of 20 countries. He then joined the Philippine national team for the 2010 FIBA Asia U-18 Championship. In that tournament, the team placed 5th.

In 2015, Tolomia and Roi Sumang were left out of the Gilas cadet pool, who would go on to represent the team in that year's SEA Games and in the SEABA Championship.

The following year, he made his return to the Gilas cadets for the 2016 SEABA Cup. His team won that tournament. After winning a D-League title, he also represented the Philippines in that year's FIBA Asia Challenge. They did not make the quarterfinals in that tournament.

In 2017, Tolomia was named to the Gilas 5.0 pool. He was one of the final cuts for that year's SEABA Championship. He got to play in the 2017 Jones Cup and won a SEA Games gold medal that year.

In 2018, Tolomia, as a member of the Meralco Bolts, played in the 2018 FIBA Asia Champions Cup.

== Personal life ==
Tolomia is the youngest among four brothers. One of his older brothers, Chester, is a former PBA player. He also played in the PBL with the Welcoat Dragons. Chester got to coach his brother in the PBA D-League in 2014.
