= 2017 PBA Commissioner's Cup =

- Duration: March 17 – July 2, 2017
- TV partner(s): Local: Sports5; TV5; PBA Rush (HD); International: AksyonTV International

Finals
- Champions: San Miguel Beermen
- Runners-up: TNT KaTropa

Awards
- Best Player: Chris Ross (San Miguel Beermen)
- Best Import: Charles Rhodes (San Miguel Beermen)
- Finals MVP: Alex Cabagnot (San Miguel Beermen)

PBA Commissioner's Cup chronology
- < 2016 2018 >

PBA conference chronology
- < 2016–17 Philippine 2017 Governors' >

The 2017 Philippine Basketball Association (PBA) Commissioner's Cup, also known as the 2017 Oppo-PBA Commissioner's Cup for sponsorship reasons, was the second conference of the 2016–17 PBA season. The tournament allows teams to hire foreign players or imports with a height limit of 6'10".

The tournament had two breaks with no games scheduled for more than seven days: first during the All-Star Week (April 26 to 30) and second during the SEABA Championship (May 12 to 18).

== Format ==
The following format will be observed for the duration of the conference:

- Single-round robin eliminations; 11 games per team; Teams are then seeded by basis on win–loss records.
- Top eight teams will advance to the quarterfinals. In case of tie, a playoff game will be held only for the #8 seed.
- Quarterfinals:
  - QF1: #1 vs #8 (#1 twice-to-beat)
  - QF2: #2 vs #7 (#2 twice-to-beat)
  - QF3: #3 vs #6 (best-of-3 series)
  - QF4: #4 vs #5 (best-of-3 series)
- Semifinals (best-of-5 series):
  - SF1: QF1 Winner vs. QF4 Winner
  - SF2: QF2 Winner vs. QF3 Winner
- Finals (best-of-7 series)
  - F1: SF1 Winner vs SF2 Winner

== Elimination round ==
=== Team standings ===
Pos	Team	W	L	PCT	GB	Qualification
1	Barangay Ginebra San Miguel	9	2	.818 (Note: Head-to-head quotient: Barangay Ginebra 1.117, San Miguel 0.990, Star 0.903)	—	Twice-to-beat in the quarterfinals
2	San Miguel Beermen	9	2	.818	—	Twice-to-beat in the quarterfinals
3	Star Hotshots	9	2	.818	—	Best-of-three quarterfinals
4	TNT KaTropa	8	3	.727	1	Best-of-three quarterfinals
5	Meralco Bolts	7	4	.636	2	Best-of-three quarterfinals
6	Rain or Shine Elasto Painters	5	6	.455	4	Best-of-three quarterfinals
7	Phoenix Fuel Masters	4	7	.364 (Note: Head-to-head quotient: Phoenix 1.127, Alaska 1.116, GlobalPort 0.791; eighth seed playoff: GlobalPort 107–106 Alaska)	5	Twice-to-win in the quarterfinals
8	GlobalPort Batang Pier	4	7	.364	5	Twice-to-win in the quarterfinals
9	Alaska Aces	4	7	.364	5	
10	Mahindra Floodbuster	3	8	.273	6	
11	Blackwater Elite	2	9	.182 (Note: Head-to-head record: Blackwater 1–0 NLEX)	7	
12	NLEX Road Warriors	2	9	.182	7	

Source: PBA.ph

=== Schedule ===
Team ╲ Game	1	2	3	4	5	6	7	8	9	10	11
Alaska Aces	GP	BWE	MAH	ROS	MER	PHX	BGSM	TNT	NLEX	SMB	SH
Barangay Ginebra San Miguel	PHX	GP	SH	NLEX	TNT	ALA	ROS	SMB	BWE	MER	MAH
Blackwater Elite	PHX	ALA	ROS	TNT	GP	MER	SH	NLEX	MAH	BGSM	SMB
GlobalPort Batang Pier	ALA	SH	BGSM	BWE	NLEX	TNT	MAH	PHX	MER	ROS	SMB
Mahindra Floodbuster	MER	ROS	NLEX	ALA	SH	TNT	SMB	GP	BWE	PHX	BGSM
Meralco Bolts	MAH	NLEX	TNT	ROS	SMB	ALA	BWE	PHX	GP	SH	BGSM
NLEX Road Warriors	ROS	MER	MAH	SH	TNT	GP	BGSM	BWE	SMB	ALA	PHX
Phoenix Fuel Masters	BWE	SH	TNT	BGSM	SMB	ROS	ALA	MER	GP	MAH	NLEX
Rain or Shine Elasto Painters	NLEX	MAH	BWE	MER	ALA	PHX	SMB	SH	BGSM	GP	TNT
San Miguel Beermen	MER	PHX	SH	MAH	ROS	TNT	NLEX	BGSM	ALA	BWE	GP
Star Hotshots	PHX	GP	NLEX	MAH	BGSM	SMB	BWE	ROS	TNT	MER	ALA
TNT KaTropa	MER	PHX	BWE	NLEX	MAH	GP	BGSM	SMB	SH	ALA	ROS

= Win; = OT win; = Loss; = OT loss

=== Results ===
Team	ALA	BGSM	BWE	GP	MAH	MER	NLEX	PHX	ROS	SMB	SH	TNT
Alaska		102–103	109–95	107–79	98–92	91–99	92–100	86–94	105–102	97–109	98–102*	110–119
Barangay Ginebra	—		96–82	113–96	94–80	90–89	101–92	91–94	112–118	107–99	113–98	107–89
Blackwater	—	—		118–113	87–96	91–102	104–98	116–118**	88–95	113–124	90–96	89–92
GlobalPort	—	—	—		105–86	94–86	85–82	72–84	107–101	101–112	77–103	88–109
Mahindra	—	—	—	—		86–94	89–81	122–121*	95–99*	80–109	83–97	84–86
Meralco	—	—	—	—	—		91–84	81–66	89–83	92–99	90–108	94–89
NLEX	—	—	—	—	—	—		116–114	105–113	108–114	103–105	121–126*
Phoenix	—	—	—	—	—	—	—		94–96	88–110	82–101	109–134
Rain or Shine	—	—	—	—	—	—	—	—		98–111	93–99	102–105
San Miguel	—	—	—	—	—	—	—	—	—		103–97	103–112
Star	—	—	—	—	—	—	—	—	—	—		107–97
TNT	—	—	—	—	—	—	—	—	—	—	—	

Legend: Blue = left column team win; Red = top row team win.
Matches with lighter background shading were decided after overtime.

== Eighth seed playoff ==
June 4

Box score

GlobalPort Batang Pier 107, Alaska Aces 106
Scoring by quarter: 20–26, 32–23, 22–29, 33–28
Pts: Harper 32; Rebs: Harper 17; Asts: Pringle 5	Pts: Jefferson 32; Rebs: Jefferson 16; Asts: Exciminiano 4

Mall of Asia Arena, Pasay
Referees: J. Mariano, E. Tangkion, R. Dacanay, E. Botecario

== Bracket ==
Quarterfinals
(#1 twice-to-beat)
1	Barangay Ginebra	96
8	GlobalPort	85
(Best-of-3)
4	TNT	2
5	Meralco	1
(#2 twice-to-beat)
2	San Miguel	115
7	Phoenix	96
(Best-of-3)
3	Star	2
6	Rain or Shine	0

Semifinals (Best-of-5)
1	Barangay Ginebra	1
4	TNT	3
2	San Miguel	3
3	Star	1

Finals (Best-of-7)
4	TNT	2
2	San Miguel	4

== Quarterfinals ==
=== (1) Barangay Ginebra vs. (8) GlobalPort ===
June 6

Box score

Barangay Ginebra San Miguel 96, GlobalPort Batang Pier 85
Scoring by quarter: 26–19, 20–14, 30–23, 20–29
Pts: Brownlee 39; Rebs: Thompson 12; Asts: Tenorio 8	Pts: Harper 29; Rebs: Harper 15; Asts: Pringle 3
Barangay Ginebra wins series in one game

Smart Araneta Coliseum, Quezon City
Referees: J. Mariano, E. Tangkion, M. Montoya, M. Lasaga

=== (2) San Miguel vs. (7) Phoenix ===
June 6

Box score

San Miguel Beermen 115, Phoenix Fuel Masters 96
Scoring by quarter: 28–21, 29–16, 31–32, 27–27
Pts: Lassiter 26; Rebs: Rhodes 11; Asts: Ross 10	Pts: McKay 20; Rebs: McKay 13; Asts: Wright 7
San Miguel wins series in one game

Smart Araneta Coliseum, Quezon City
Referees: N. Quilinguen, R. Gruta, M. Flordeliza, G. Narandan

=== (3) Star vs. (6) Rain or Shine ===
June 5

Box score

Star Hotshots 118, Rain or Shine Elasto Painters 82
Scoring by quarter: 26–23, 35–17, 34–24, 23–18
Pts: Ratliffe 29; Rebs: Ratliffe 8 Asts: Lee 10	Pts: Crews 19; Rebs: Crews 13; Asts: Tolomia 5

Smart Araneta Coliseum, Quezon City
Referees: N. Guevarra, S. Pineda, R. Yante, E. Botecario

June 7

Box score

Star Hotshots 84, Rain or Shine Elasto Painters 69
Scoring by quarter: 16–19, 17–18, 22–15, 29–17
Pts: Ratliffe 26; Rebs: Ratliffe 24; Asts: Ratliffe 5	Pts: Crews 12; Rebs: Belga 6 Asts: Ahanmisi 4
Star wins series, 2–0

Smart Araneta Coliseum, Quezon City
Referees: N. Guevarra, E. Tangkion, R. Gruta, J. Narandan

=== (4) TNT vs. (5) Meralco ===
June 5

Box score

TNT KaTropa 102, Meralco Bolts 84
Scoring by quarter: 25–13, 17–14, 27–32, 33–25
Pts: Castro 25; Rebs: Tautuaa, Williams 8 Asts: Castro 7	Pts: Newsome 21; Rebs: Stepheson 16; Asts: Newsome, Stepheson 4

Smart Araneta Coliseum, Quezon City
Referees: N. Quilingen, P. Balao, B. Oliva, J. Nicandro

June 7

Box score

TNT KaTropa 100, Meralco Bolts 103 (OT)
Scoring by quarter: 13–32, 31–17, 29–30, 19–13, Overtime: 8–11
Pts: Smith 18; Rebs: Smith 18; Asts: Garcia 5	Pts: Amer 32; Rebs: Stepheson 13; Asts: Dillinger 6

Smart Araneta Coliseum, Quezon City
Referees: P. Balao, J. Mariano, R. Yante, D. Dacanay

June 9

Box score

TNT KaTropa 104, Meralco Bolts 96 (OT)
Scoring by quarter: 29–19, 9–24, 28–30, 23–16, Overtime: 15–7
Pts: Castro, Smith 31; Rebs: Smith 27; Asts: Smith 4	Pts: Amer 25; Rebs: Hodge, Stepheson 12; Asts: Newsome 9
TNT wins series, 2–1

Smart Araneta Coliseum, Quezon City
Referees: N. Quilinguen, S. Pineda, M. Flordeliza, M. Orioste

== Semifinals ==
=== (1) Barangay Ginebra vs. (4) TNT ===
June 11

Box score

Barangay Ginebra San Miguel 94, TNT KaTropa 100
Scoring by quarter: 13–23, 24–22, 29–28, 28–27
Pts: Brownlee 24; Rebs: Brownlee 14; Asts: Brownlee 6	Pts: Smith 35; Rebs: Smith 13; Asts: Castro 6

Mall of Asia Arena, Pasay
Referees: J. Mariano, S. Pineda, B. Oliva, M. Orioste

June 13

Box score

Barangay Ginebra San Miguel 103, TNT KaTropa 107
Scoring by quarter: 26–22, 33–34, 26–28, 18–23
Pts: Brownlee, Tenorio 22; Rebs: Brownlee 12; Asts: Thompson 9	Pts: Smith 16; Rebs: Smith 16; Asts: Castro 8

Mall of Asia Arena, Pasay
Referees: N. Quilinguen, P. Balao, G. Narandan, E. Botecario

June 15

Box score

Barangay Ginebra San Miguel 125, TNT KaTropa 101
Scoring by quarter: 34–28, 27–19, 35–27, 29–27
Pts: Brownlee 31; Rebs: Brownlee 11; Asts: Mercado 5	Pts: Garcia 16; Rebs: Smith 7 Asts: Castro, Garcia 3

Smart Araneta Coliseum, Quezon City
Referees: E. Tangkion, S. Pineda, R. Gruta, M. Orioste

June 17

Box score

Barangay Ginebra San Miguel 109, TNT KaTropa 122
Scoring by quarter: 35–29, 28–37, 29–29, 17–27
Pts: Aguilar 31; Rebs: Brownlee 15; Asts: Tenorio 10	Pts: Castro 38; Rebs: Williams 12; Asts: Castro 11
TNT wins series, 3–1

Cuneta Astrodome, Pasay
Referees: N. Quilinguen, J. Mariano, B. Oliva, M. Flordeliza

=== (2) San Miguel vs. (3) Star ===
June 10

Box score

San Miguel Beermen 105, Star Hotshots 109
Scoring by quarter: 22–23, 24–22, 26–30, 23–24
Pts: Rhodes 34; Rebs: Rhodes, Ross 10; Asts: Ross 15	Pts: Maliksi, Ratliffe 26; Rebs: Ratliffe 21; Asts: Lee 8

Smart Araneta Coliseum, Quezon City
Referees: N. Quilinguen, P. Balao, M. Montoya, J. Nicandro

June 12

Box score

San Miguel Beermen 77, Star Hotshots 76
Scoring by quarter: 25–16, 19–14, 14–30, 19–16
Pts: Rhodes 21; Rebs: Rhodes 10; Asts: Lassiter, Ross 4	Pts: Ratliffe 25; Rebs: Ratliffe 35; Asts: Melton, Ratliffe 3

Mall of Asia Arena, Pasay
Referees: N. Guevarra, S. Pineda, R. Yante, R. Dacanay

June 14

Box score

San Miguel Beermen 111, Star Hotshots 110
Scoring by quarter: 32–28, 24–24, 29–29, 26–29
Pts: Rhodes 36; Rebs: Fajardo, Ross 8 Asts: Ross 8	Pts: Ratliffe 44; Rebs: Ratliffe 19; Asts: Ratliffe 7

Smart Araneta Coliseum, Quezon City
Referees: J. Mariano, E. Tangkion, M. Flordeliza, M. Orioste

June 16

Box score

San Miguel Beermen 109, Star Hotshots 102
Scoring by quarter: 29–27, 23–22, 31–20, 26–33
Pts: Cabagnot 26; Rebs: Rhodes 10; Asts: Ross 10	Pts: Ratliffe 36; Rebs: Ratliffe 17; Asts: Barroca 6
San Miguel wins series, 3–1

Mall of Asia Arena, Pasay
Referees: P. Balao, S. Pineda, B. Oliva, M. Lasaga

== Finals ==
TV5

June 21
7:00pm

Box score

TNT KaTropa 104, San Miguel Beermen 102

Smart Araneta Coliseum, Quezon City

TV5

June 23
7:00pm

Box score

TNT KaTropa 88, San Miguel Beermen 102

Smart Araneta Coliseum, Quezon City

TV5

June 25
6:30pm

Box score

TNT KaTropa 97, San Miguel Beermen 109

Smart Araneta Coliseum, Quezon City

TV5

June 28
7:00pm

Box score

TNT KaTropa 102, San Miguel Beermen 97

Smart Araneta Coliseum, Quezon City

TV5

June 30
7:00pm

Box score

TNT KaTropa 102, San Miguel Beermen 111

Smart Araneta Coliseum, Quezon City

TV5

July 2
6:30pm

Box score

TNT KaTropa 91, San Miguel Beermen 115
San Miguel wins series, 4–2

Smart Araneta Coliseum, Quezon City

== Imports ==
The following is the list of imports, which had played for their respective teams at least once, with the returning imports in italics. Highlighted are the imports who stayed with their respective teams for the whole conference.

Team	Name	Debuted	Last game	Record
Alaska Aces	Cory Jefferson	March 18 (vs. GlobalPort)	June 4 (vs. GlobalPort)	4–8
Barangay Ginebra San Miguel	Justin Brownlee	April 1 (vs. Phoenix)	June 17 (vs. TNT)	11–5
Blackwater Elite	Greg Smith	March 18 (vs. Phoenix)	May 31 (vs. San Miguel)	3–8
GlobalPort Batang Pier	Sean Williams	March 18 (vs. Alaska)	April 5 (vs. Brgy. Ginebra)	0–3
GlobalPort Batang Pier	Malcolm White	April 8 (vs. Blackwater)	May 5 (vs. Phoenix)	2–3
GlobalPort Batang Pier	Justin Harper	May 10 (vs. Meralco)	June 6 (vs. Barangay Ginebra)	3–2
Mahindra Floodbuster	James White	March 17 (vs. Meralco)	March 29 (vs. Alaska)	1–3
Mahindra Floodbuster	Keith Wright	April 5 (vs. Star)	June 2 (vs. Brgy. Ginebra)	2–5
Meralco Bolts	Alex Stepheson	March 17 (vs. Mahindra)	June 9 (vs. TNT)	8–6
NLEX Road Warriors	Wayne Chism	March 17 (vs. Rain or Shine)	May 27 (vs. Phoenix)	2–9
Phoenix Fuel Masters	Eugene Phelps	March 18 (vs. Blackwater)	March 18 (vs. Blackwater)	1–0
Phoenix Fuel Masters	Jameel McKay	March 22 (vs. Star)	June 6 (vs. San Miguel)	3–8
Rain or Shine Elasto Painters	Shawn Taggart	March 17 (vs. NLEX)	May 6 (vs. Star)	4–4
Rain or Shine Elasto Painters	Duke Crews	May 19 (vs. Ginebra)	June 7 (vs. Star)	1–4
San Miguel Beermen	Charles Rhodes	April 2 (vs. Meralco)	July 2 (vs. TNT)	17–5
Star Hotshots	Tony Mitchell	March 22 (vs. Phoenix)	May 6 (vs. Rain or Shine)	6–2
Star Hotshots	Ricardo Ratliffe	May 10 (vs. TNT)	June 16 (vs. San Miguel)	6–3
TNT KaTropa	Lou Amundson	March 24 (vs. Meralco)	March 26 (vs. Phoenix)	1–1
TNT KaTropa	Donté Greene	March 31 (vs. Blackwater)	May 10 (vs. Star)	5–2
TNT KaTropa	Joshua Smith	May 20 (vs. Alaska)	July 2 (vs. San Miguel)	9–6

== Awards ==
=== Conference ===
- Best Player of the Conference: Chris Ross (San Miguel Beermen)
- Bobby Parks Best Import of the Conference: Charles Rhodes (San Miguel Beermen)
- Finals MVP: Alex Cabagnot (San Miguel Beermen)

=== Players of the Week ===
Week	Player	Ref.
March 17–19	James Yap (Rain or Shine Elasto Painters)	
March 20–26	Mark Barroca (Star Hotshots)	
March 27 – April 2	Sonny Thoss (Alaska Aces)	
April 3–9	LA Tenorio (Barangay Ginebra San Miguel)	
April 10–16	Jeff Chan (Rain or Shine Elasto Painters)	
April 17–23	LA Tenorio (Barangay Ginebra San Miguel)	
May 2–7	Baser Amer (Meralco Bolts)	
May 8–21	Jericho Cruz (Rain or Shine Elasto Painters)	
May 22–28	LA Tenorio (Barangay Ginebra San Miguel)	
May 29 – June 4	Chris Ross (San Miguel Beermen)	
June 5 – June 11	Roger Pogoy (TNT KaTropa)	
June 12–18	Jayson Castro (TNT KaTropa)	
