= 2016–17 Meralco Bolts season =

- Head coach: Norman Black
- General manager: Paolo Trillo
- Owners: Manila Electric Company (an MVP Group subsidiary)

Philippine Cup results
- Record: 3–8 (27.3%)
- Place: 11th
- Playoff finish: Did not qualify

Commissioner's Cup results
- Record: 7–4 (63.6%)
- Place: 5th
- Playoff finish: Quarterfinalist (lost to TNT, 1–2)

Governors' Cup results
- Record: 9–2 (81.8%)
- Place: 1st
- Playoff finish: Runner-up (lost to Barangay Ginebra, 3–4)

Meralco Bolts seasons

The 2016–17 Meralco Bolts season was the 7th season of the franchise in the Philippine Basketball Association (PBA).

== Key dates ==
=== 2016 ===
- October 30: The 2016 PBA draft took place at Midtown Atrium, Robinson Place Manila.

== Draft picks ==
=== Special draft ===
Player	Position	Nationality	PBA D-League team	College
Ed Daquioag	G	Philippines	Phoenix Accelerators	UST

=== Regular draft ===
Round	Pick	Player	Position	Nationality	PBA D-League team	College
2	7	Jonathan Grey	G/F	Philippines	Racal Tile Masters	DLS-Benilde
3	13	Jessie Saitanan	C	Philippines	Bread Story Smashing Bakers	Mapua
4	21	Ryusei Koga	G	Philippines	Hapee Fresh Fighters	San Beda

== Roster ==
2016–17 Meralco Bolts roster
Players
Coaches

Pos.	#	POB	Name	Height	Weight	DOB (YYYY–MM–DD)	From
F/C	0	(Philippines)	Bryan Faundo	6 ft 6 in (1.98 m)	225 lb (102 kg)	1984–02–18	Letran
G	1	(Philippines)	Simon Atkins	5 ft 11 in (1.80 m)	185 lb (84 kg)	1988–07–19	De La Salle
G	6	(Philippines)	Mike Tolomia (R)	5 ft 11 in (1.80 m)	170 lb (77 kg)	1993–01–06	Far Eastern
F	7	(United States)	Cliff Hodge	6 ft 4 in (1.93 m)	195 lb (88 kg)	1988–02–03	Reedley
G	8	(Philippines)	Joseph Yeo	6 ft 0 in (1.83 m)	190 lb (86 kg)	1983–09–07	De La Salle
G	9	(Philippines)	Baser Amer	6 ft 0 in (1.83 m)	170 lb (77 kg)	1992–09–29	San Beda
G	10	(Philippines)	Jonathan Uyloan	6 ft 1 in (1.85 m)	185 lb (84 kg)	1983–11–26	Golden West
G/F	11	(United States)	Chris Newsome (C)	6 ft 2 in (1.88 m)	190 lb (86 kg)	1990–06–25	Ateneo
G	13	(Philippines)	Garvo Lanete	6 ft 2 in (1.88 m)	180 lb (82 kg)	1989–02–13	San Beda
G	15	(Philippines)	Joseph Sedurifa	6 ft 1 in (1.85 m)	175 lb (79 kg)	1990–09–04	Centro Escolar
G	17	(Philippines)	Anjo Caram	5 ft 7 in (1.70 m)	159 lb (72 kg)	1991–01–14	San Beda
F	20	(United States)	Jared Dillinger	6 ft 4 in (1.93 m)	220 lb (100 kg)	1984–01–06	Hawaiʻi
F	21	(Philippines)	Reynel Hugnatan	6 ft 4 in (1.93 m)	210 lb (95 kg)	1978–11–03	Manila
F/C	23	(United States)	Kelly Nabong	6 ft 6 in (1.98 m)	227 lb (103 kg)	1988–11–17	SRJC
F/C	25	(Philippines)	Ken Bono	6 ft 5 in (1.96 m)	280 lb (127 kg)	1984–07–19	Adamson
F	33	(Philippines)	Ranidel de Ocampo	6 ft 6 in (1.98 m)	210 lb (95 kg)	1981–12–08	Saint Francis of Assisi
G/F	–	(United States)	Chris Lutz (IN)	6 ft 3 in (1.91 m)	200 lb (91 kg)	1985–02–11	Marshall

Head coach

- (United States) Norman Black

Assistant coach(es)

- (Philippines) Ronnie Magsanoc (1st Assistant)
- (Philippines) Gene Afable
- (Philippines) Jimmy Alapag
- (Philippines) Patrick Fran
- (Philippines) Jamike Jarin
- (Philippines) Xavier Nunag
- (Philippines) Luigi Trillo

Team manager

- (Philippines) Paolo Trillo

Legend

- (C) Team captain
- (CI) Commissioner's Cup Import
- (GI) Governors' Cup Import
- (EI) EASL Import
- (DP) Unsigned draft pick
- (FA) Free agent
- (IN) Inactive
- (S) Suspended
- (R) Rookie
- Injured

Roster

== Philippine Cup ==
=== Eliminations ===
==== Standings ====
Pos	Team	W	L	PCT	GB	Qualification
1	San Miguel Beermen	10	1	.909	—	Twice-to-beat in the quarterfinals
2	Alaska Aces	7	4	.636 (Note: Head-to-head record: Alaska 1–0 Star)	3	Twice-to-beat in the quarterfinals
3	Star Hotshots	7	4	.636	3	Best-of-three quarterfinals
4	TNT KaTropa	6	5	.545 (Note: Head-to-head quotient: TNT 1.09, GlobalPort 1.00, Phoenix 0.96, Barangay Ginebra 0.94.)	4	Best-of-three quarterfinals
5	GlobalPort Batang Pier	6	5	.545	4	Best-of-three quarterfinals
6	Phoenix Fuel Masters	6	5	.545	4	Best-of-three quarterfinals
7	Barangay Ginebra San Miguel	6	5	.545	4	Twice-to-win in the quarterfinals
8	Rain or Shine Elasto Painters	5	6	.455 (Note: Eighth seed playoff: Rain or Shine 103–80 Blackwater)	5	Twice-to-win in the quarterfinals
9	Blackwater Elite	5	6	.455	5	
10	Mahindra Floodbuster	3	8	.273 (Note: Head-to-head record: Mahindra 1–0 Meralco)	7	
11	Meralco Bolts	3	8	.273	7	
12	NLEX Road Warriors	2	9	.182	8	

Source: PBA.ph

==== Game log ====
2017 PBA Philippine Cup game log
Total: 3–8
November: 0–1

Game	Date	Opponent	Score	High points	High rebounds	High assists	Location Attendance	Record
1	November 27	Blackwater	L 84–86	Cliff Hodge (14)	Kelly Nabong (10)	Cliff Hodge (8)	Smart Araneta Coliseum	0–1

December: 2–3

Game	Date	Opponent	Score	High points	High rebounds	High assists	Location Attendance	Record
2	December 3	NLEX	W 106–93	Chris Newsome (28)	Chris Newsome (10)	Chris Newsome (5)	Smart Araneta Coliseum	1–1
3	December 9	TNT	W 98–87	Ed Daquioag (23)	Chris Newsome (10)	Chris Newsome (8)	Smart Araneta Coliseum	2–1
4	December 14	Alaska	L 79–81	Chris Newsome (23)	Hodge, Newsome (8)	Chris Newsome (5)	Smart Araneta Coliseum	2–2
5	December 21	Phoenix	L 90–94	Jonathan Grey (24)	Cliff Hodge (11)	Chris Newsome (8)	Filoil Flying V Centre	2–3
6	December 28	San Miguel	L 86–101	Chris Newsome (16)	Cliff Hodge (15)	Hodge, Newsome (5)	Cuneta Astrodome	2–4

January: 1–4

Game	Date	Opponent	Score	High points	High rebounds	High assists	Location Attendance	Record
7	January 6	GlobalPort	L 89–97	Reynel Hugnatan (23)	Chris Newsome (10)	Daquioag, Hodge, Newsome (3)	Mall of Asia Arena	2–5
8	January 11	Mahindra	L 92–105	Reynel Hugnatan (28)	Bryan Faundo (7)	Chris Newsome (8)	Smart Araneta Coliseum	2–6
9	January 14	Barangay Ginebra	L 72–83	Reynel Hugnatan (18)	Chris Newsome (9)	Chris Newsome (4)	University of San Agustin Gym	2–7
10	January 20	Rain or Shine	W 82–72	Chris Newsome (19)	Cliff Hodge (16)	Chris Newsome (6)	Cuneta Astrodome	3–7
11	January 28	Star	L 73–120	Chris Newsome (13)	Cliff Hodge (7)	Chris Newsome (4)	Ynares Center	3–8

2016–17 schedule

== Commissioner's Cup ==
=== Eliminations ===
==== Standings ====
Pos	Team	W	L	PCT	GB	Qualification
1	Barangay Ginebra San Miguel	9	2	.818 (Note: Head-to-head quotient: Barangay Ginebra 1.117, San Miguel 0.990, Star 0.903)	—	Twice-to-beat in the quarterfinals
2	San Miguel Beermen	9	2	.818	—	Twice-to-beat in the quarterfinals
3	Star Hotshots	9	2	.818	—	Best-of-three quarterfinals
4	TNT KaTropa	8	3	.727	1	Best-of-three quarterfinals
5	Meralco Bolts	7	4	.636	2	Best-of-three quarterfinals
6	Rain or Shine Elasto Painters	5	6	.455	4	Best-of-three quarterfinals
7	Phoenix Fuel Masters	4	7	.364 (Note: Head-to-head quotient: Phoenix 1.127, Alaska 1.116, GlobalPort 0.791; eighth seed playoff: GlobalPort 107–106 Alaska)	5	Twice-to-win in the quarterfinals
8	GlobalPort Batang Pier	4	7	.364	5	Twice-to-win in the quarterfinals
9	Alaska Aces	4	7	.364	5	
10	Mahindra Floodbuster	3	8	.273	6	
11	Blackwater Elite	2	9	.182 (Note: Head-to-head record: Blackwater 1–0 NLEX)	7	
12	NLEX Road Warriors	2	9	.182	7	

Source: PBA.ph

==== Game log ====
2017 PBA Commissioner's Cup game log
Total: 7–4
March: 4–0

Game	Date	Opponent	Score	High points	High rebounds	High assists	Location Attendance	Record
1	March 17	Mahindra	W 94–86	Baser Amer (19)	Alex Stepheson (21)	Chris Newsome (7)	Smart Araneta Coliseum	1–0
2	March 19	NLEX	W 91–84	Jared Dillinger (20)	Alex Stepheson (24)	Baser Amer (4)	Smart Araneta Coliseum	2–0
3	March 24	TNT	W 94–89	Alex Stepheson (20)	Alex Stepheson (27)	Chris Newsome (7)	Smart Araneta Coliseum	3–0
4	March 29	Rain or Shine	W 89–83	Alex Stepheson (21)	Alex Stepheson (15)	Baser Amer (6)	Mall of Asia Arena	4–0

April: 2–1

Game	Date	Opponent	Score	High points	High rebounds	High assists	Location Attendance	Record
5	April 2	San Miguel	L 92–99	Dillinger, Stepheson (21)	Alex Stepheson (26)	Baser Amer (8)	Smart Araneta Coliseum	4–1
6	April 8	Alaska	W 99–91	Baser Amer (19)	Alex Stepheson (26)	Baser Amer (5)	Mall of Asia Arena	5–1
7	April 16	Blackwater	W 102–91	Jared Dillinger (21)	Alex Stepheson (15)	Alex Stepheson (5)	Smart Araneta Coliseum	6–1
All-Star Break

May: 1–3

Game	Date	Opponent	Score	High points	High rebounds	High assists	Location Attendance	Record
8	May 3	Phoenix	W 81–66	Baser Amer (20)	Alex Stepheson (20)	Amer, Hodge, Stepheson (3)	Smart Araneta Coliseum	7–1
9	May 10	GlobalPort	L 86–94	Alex Stepheson (19)	Alex Stepheson (27)	Baser Amer (7)	Mall of Asia Arena	7–2
10	May 24	Star	L 90–108	Chris Newsome (25)	Alex Stepheson (9)	Chris Newsome (8)	Smart Araneta Coliseum	7–3
11	May 28	Barangay Ginebra	L 89–90	Baser Amer (21)	Alex Stepheson (20)	Amer, Newsome (4)	Ynares Center	7–4

2016–17 schedule

=== Playoffs ===
==== Bracket ====
Quarterfinals
(#1 twice-to-beat)
1	Barangay Ginebra	96
8	GlobalPort	85
(Best-of-3)
4	TNT	2
5	Meralco	1
(#2 twice-to-beat)
2	San Miguel	115
7	Phoenix	96
(Best-of-3)
3	Star	2
6	Rain or Shine	0

Semifinals (Best-of-5)
1	Barangay Ginebra	1
4	TNT	3
2	San Miguel	3
3	Star	1

Finals (Best-of-7)
4	TNT	2
2	San Miguel	4

==== Game log ====
2017 PBA Commissioner's Cup playoffs game log
Total: 1–2
Quarterfinals: 1–2

Game	Date	Opponent	Score	High points	High rebounds	High assists	Location Attendance	Series
1	June 5	TNT	L 84–102	Chris Newsome (21)	Alex Stepheson (16)	Newsome, Stepheson (4)	Smart Araneta Coliseum	0–1
2	June 7	TNT	W 103–100 (OT)	Baser Amer (32)	Alex Stepheson (13)	Jared Dillinger (6)	Smart Araneta Coliseum	1–1
3	June 9	TNT	L 96–104 (OT)	Baser Amer (25)	Hodge, Stepheson (12)	Chris Newsome (9)	Smart Araneta Coliseum	1–2

2016–17 schedule

== Governors' Cup ==
=== Eliminations ===
==== Standings ====
Pos	Team	W	L	PCT	GB	Qualification
1	Meralco Bolts	9	2	.818	—	Twice-to-beat in the quarterfinals
2	TNT KaTropa	8	3	.727 (Note: Head-to-head record: Talk 'N Text 1–0 Barangay Ginebra)	1	Twice-to-beat in the quarterfinals
3	Barangay Ginebra San Miguel	8	3	.727	1	Twice-to-beat in the quarterfinals
4	Star Hotshots	7	4	.636 (Note: Head to-head quotient: Star 1.04, NLEX 1.01, San Miguel 0.99, Rain or Shine 0.96)	2	Twice-to-beat in the quarterfinals
5	NLEX Road Warriors	7	4	.636	2	Twice-to-win in the quarterfinals
6	San Miguel Beermen	7	4	.636	2	Twice-to-win in the quarterfinals
7	Rain or Shine Elasto Painters	7	4	.636	2	Twice-to-win in the quarterfinals
8	Blackwater Elite	5	6	.455	4	Twice-to-win in the quarterfinals
9	Alaska Aces	3	8	.273 (Note: Head-to-head record: Alaska 1–0 GlobalPort)	6	
10	GlobalPort Batang Pier	3	8	.273	6	
11	Phoenix Fuel Masters	2	9	.182	7	
12	Kia Picanto	0	11	.000	9	

Source: PBA.ph

==== Game log ====
2017 PBA Governors' Cup game log
Total: 9–2
July: 3–0

Game	Date	Opponent	Score	High points	High rebounds	High assists	Location Attendance	Record
1	July 19	Blackwater	W 107–78	Baser Amer (20)	Allen Durham (21)	Baser Amer (8)	Smart Araneta Coliseum	1–0
2	July 23	Barangay Ginebra	W 93–78	Allen Durham (30)	Allen Durham (24)	Allen Durham (9)	Smart Araneta Coliseum	2–0
3	July 29	Rain or Shine	W 89–73	Allen Durham (23)	Allen Durham (23)	Allen Durham (8)	Ynares Center	3–0

August: 2–1

Game	Date	Opponent	Score	High points	High rebounds	High assists	Location Attendance	Record
4	August 6	Kia	W 112–97	Allen Durham (25)	Allen Durham (11)	Allen Durham (13)	Smart Araneta Coliseum	4–0
5	August 13	NLEX	L 94–100	Allen Durham (26)	Allen Durham (14)	Dillinger, Newsome (4)	Mall of Asia Arena	4–1
6	August 18	Phoenix	W 107–104	Allen Durham (33)	Allen Durham (16)	Allen Durham (7)	Smart Araneta Coliseum	5–1

September: 4–1

Game	Date	Opponent	Score	High points	High rebounds	High assists	Location Attendance	Record
7	September 6	TNT	L 107–113	Allen Durham (39)	Allen Durham (24)	Chris Newsome (5)	Smart Araneta Coliseum	5–2
8	September 9	Star	W 96–90	Allen Durham (29)	Allen Durham (27)	Durham, Newsome (7)	Sta. Rosa Multi-Purpose Complex	6–2
9	September 15	Alaska	W 106–78	Allen Durham (26)	Allen Durham (18)	Allen Durham (6)	Smart Araneta Coliseum	7–2
10	September 22	GlobalPort	W 100–93	Chris Newsome (28)	Allen Durham (22)	Allen Durham (10)	Mall of Asia Arena	8–2
11	September 24	San Miguel	W 104–101	Allen Durham (35)	Cliff Hodge (15)	Allen Durham (8)	Smart Araneta Coliseum	9–2

2016–17 schedule

=== Playoffs ===
==== Bracket ====
Quarterfinals (Top 4 twice-to-beat)
1	Meralco	91	104
8	Blackwater	92	96
4	Star	89
5	NLEX	77
2	TNT	102	118
7	Rain or Shine	106	114
3	Barangay Ginebra	104
6	San Miguel	84

Semifinals (Best-of-5)
1	Meralco	3
4	Star	0
2	TNT	1
3	Barangay Ginebra	3

Finals (Best-of-7)
1	Meralco	3
3	Barangay Ginebra	4

==== Game log ====
2017 PBA Governors' Cup playoffs game log
Total: 7–5
Quarterfinals: 1–1

Game	Date	Opponent	Score	High points	High rebounds	High assists	Location Attendance	Record
1	September 26	Blackwater	L 91–92	Chris Newsome (19)	Allen Durham (21)	Allen Durham (7)	Mall of Asia Arena	0–1
2	September 28	Blackwater	W 104–96	Baser Amer (31)	Allen Durham (20)	Allen Durham (9)	Smart Araneta Coliseum	1–1

Semifinals: 3–0

Game	Date	Opponent	Score	High points	High rebounds	High assists	Location Attendance	Record
1	October 1	Star	W 72–66	Allen Durham (23)	Allen Durham (23)	Jared Dillinger (5)	Alonte Sports Arena	1–0
2	October 3	Star	W 98–74	three players (18)	Allen Durham (25)	Baser Amer (8)	Sta. Rosa Multi-Purpose Complex	2–0
3	October 5	Star	W 91–88 (OT)	Allen Durham (24)	Allen Durham (19)	Allen Durham (6)	Smart Araneta Coliseum	3–0

Finals: 3–4

Game	Date	Opponent	Score	High points	High rebounds	High assists	Location Attendance	Record
1	October 13	Barangay Ginebra	L 87–102	Allen Durham (27)	Allen Durham (14)	Allen Durham (8)	Quezon Convention Center	0–1
2	October 15	Barangay Ginebra	L 76–86	Allen Durham (25)	Allen Durham (22)	Allen Durham (7)	Smart Araneta Coliseum; 16,159	0–2
3	October 18	Barangay Ginebra	W 94–81	Allen Durham (38)	Allen Durham (20)	Chris Newsome (12)	Smart Araneta Coliseum	1–2
4	October 20	Barangay Ginebra	W 85–83	Allen Durham (28)	Allen Durham (18)	Jared Dillinger (5)	Smart Araneta Coliseum; 16,164	2–2
5	October 22	Barangay Ginebra	L 74–85	Allen Durham (27)	Allen Durham (19)	Amer, Durham (5)	Philippine Arena; 36,445	2–3
6	October 25	Barangay Ginebra	W 98–91	Allen Durham (28)	Allen Durham (19)	Chris Newsome (11)	Philippine Arena; 53,642	3–3
7	October 27	Barangay Ginebra	L 96–101	Allen Durham (26)	Allen Durham (24)	Allen Durham (9)	Philippine Arena; 54,086	3–4

2016–17 schedule

== Transactions ==
=== Trades ===
==== Commissioner's Cup ====
March 2017
March 28	Three-team trade
March 28	To Meralco 2018 Second Round pick (from Blackwater)	To Blackwater 2017 Second Round pick (from NLEX)
March 28	To NLEX Rabeh Al-Hussaini (from Meralco)
May 2017
May 6	Four-team trade
May 6	To Meralco: Garvo Lanete (from NLEX)	To GlobalPort: Sean Anthony (from NLEX); Bradwyn Guinto (from NLEX); Jonathan Grey (from Meralco)
May 6	To NLEX: Larry Fonacier (from TNT); J.R. Quiñahan (from GlobalPort); 2017 Second Round pick (from Meralco, originally from Mahindra); 2019 Second Round pick (from GlobalPort)	To TNT: Anthony Semerad (from GlobalPort); 2017 First Round Pick (from GlobalPort, originally from TNT)

==== Governors' Cup ====
August
August 7	To Meralco: Mike Tolomia	To Rain or Shine: Ed Daquioag
September
September 11, 2017
September 11, 2017	Three-team trade
September 11, 2017	To Meralco: Ranidel De Ocampo (from TNT)	To TNT: Norbert Torres (from Phoenix); Justin Chua (from Meralco); 2017 1st round pick (from Phoenix via San Miguel)
September 11, 2017	To Phoenix: 2017 1st round pick (from Meralco); 2019 2nd round pick (from TNT via San Miguel)

=== Recruited imports ===
Conference	Name	Country	Number	Debuted	Last game	Record
Commissioner's Cup	Alex Stepheson	(United States)	33	March 17 (vs. Mahindra)	June 9 (vs. TNT)	8–6
Governors' Cup	Allen Durham	(United States)	5	July 21 (vs. Blackwater)	October 27 (vs. Barangay Ginebra)	16–7

== Awards ==
Recipient	Award	Date awarded	Ref.
Baser Amer	Commissioner's Cup Player of the Week	May 8, 2017	
Chris Newsome	Governors' Cup Player of the Week	September 25, 2017	
Jared Dillinger	Governors' Cup Player of the Week	October 3, 2017	
Jared Dillinger	Governors' Cup Player of the Week	October 9, 2017	
Allen Durham	Governors' Cup Best Import of the Conference	October 15, 2017	
Honors
Cliff Hodge	Second Mythical Team	October 20, 2017	
