= Chris Newsome =

Filipino-American basketball player

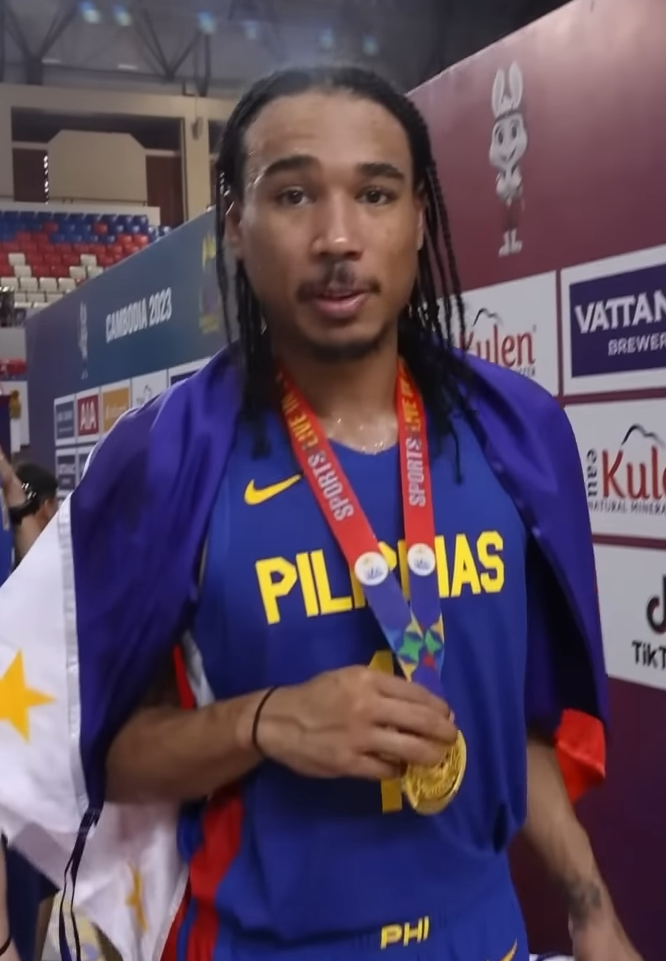
- Newsome in 2023

No. 11 – Meralco Bolts
- Position: Shooting guard / small forward
- League: PBA

Personal information
- Born: July 25, 1990 (age 36) San Jose, California, U.S.
- Listed height: 6 ft 2 in (1.88 m)
- Listed weight: 190 lb (86 kg)

Career information
- High school: Rio Rancho (Rio Rancho, New Mexico)
- College: New Mexico Highlands (2008–2011); Ateneo (2013–2014)
- PBA draft: 2015: 1st round, 4th overall pick
- Drafted by: Meralco Bolts
- Playing career: 2015–present

Career history
- 2015–present: Meralco Bolts

Career highlights
- PBA champion (2024 Philippine); PBA Finals MVP (2024 Philippine); 3× PBA All-Star (2023, 2024, 2026); PBA First Mythical Team (2024); 2× PBA All-Defensive Team (2023, 2024); PBA Rookie of the Year (2016); PBA All-Rookie Team (2016); PBA Slam Dunk Contest champion (2017); PBA D-League champion (2014–15 Aspirant's); UAAP Mythical Team (2014)
Medals
Men's basketball
Representing Philippines
Asian Games
Gold medal – first place	2022 Hangzhou	Team
SEA Games
Gold medal – first place	2023 Phnom Penh	Team
Men's 3x3 basketball
Representing Philippines
SEA Games
Gold medal – first place	2019 Philippines	Team

Christopher Elijah Duque Newsome (born July 25, 1990) is a Filipino-American professional basketball player for the Meralco Bolts of the Philippine Basketball Association (PBA).

== Early life ==
Newsome was born on July 25, 1990, in San Jose, California, the second child of Carmelita (née Duque), a Filipina from Parañaque, and Eric, an African American. He has one older brother, Eric Jr., and two younger sisters, Nishelle and Melissa. Growing up, his primary sports were baseball and football, and he did not play basketball until seventh grade. When the Newsomes moved to Albuquerque, New Mexico, he attended Rio Rancho High School and helped the Rio Rancho Rams win the 5A State Championship in 2007.

== College career ==
Newsome attended New Mexico Highlands University, an NCAA Division II school, for three years. In his final season with the Cowboys in 2011, he averaged 10.1 points and 4.2 rebounds per outing. He was recruited by then–Ateneo head coach Norman Black to play for the Ateneo Blue Eagles and the Philippines national team that will compete in the Southeast Asian Games. He accepted the offer and spent two years of residency (as per UAAP rules for foreign students) before finally seeing action for Ateneo in 2013. In his final season with the Blue Eagles, he posted averages of 14 PPG and 8 RPG while earning a spot among the UAAP Season 77 Mythical 5 team.

== Amateur career ==
Newsome suited up for the Hapee Fresh Fighters in the PBA D-League, where he teamed up with fellow college standouts and future draft batchmates Troy Rosario, Baser Amer, Garvo Lanete and Scottie Thompson. Together, they helped the Fresh Fighters win its first ever PBA D-League title in 2015.

== Professional career ==
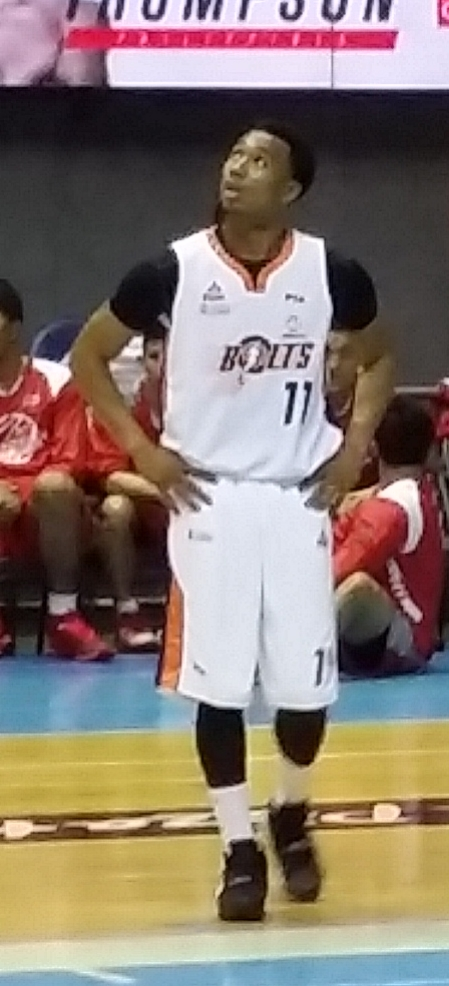
Newsome with the Meralco Bolts in 2016

Newsome was drafted fourth overall by the Meralco Bolts in the 2015 PBA draft, reuniting with his former collegiate coach Norman Black. A few days after the draft, he signed a three-year deal with the Bolts.

In his PBA debut on October 28, 2015, he finished with a team-high-tying 14 points, including two on a highlight slam dunk over San Miguel's Arwind Santos. Newsome quickly rose to stardom. He participated in the PBA All-Star Weekend Slam Dunk Contest, making it to the final round only to lose to two-time defending champion, Rey Guevarra. He became a key player in Meralco's rotation as the season went on. He helped Meralco get to the Semi-Finals of the 2016 PBA Commissioner's Cup and to the Finals of the 2016 PBA Governors' Cup before eventually losing to the Barangay Ginebra San Miguel.

He was named as the PBA Rookie of the Year 2016 during the PBA Leo Awards Night. Other nominees for the league's newcomer trophy were Maverick Ahanmisi, Arthur dela Cruz, Troy Rosario and Moala Tautuaa.

Newsome started the 2016–17 Philippine Cup with a career-high 28 points with 10 rebounds in a win against the NLEX Road Warriors. After a six-game losing streak, he led the team to a win over the Rain or Shine Elasto Painters with 19 points and 6 assists. They didn't make the playoffs that conference, finishing with a 47-point loss to the Star Hotshots. That season, he was snubbed from the All-Star Game, but he was able to win his first Slam Dunk title, finishing just one point ahead of James Forrester. The Bolts made it to the playoffs of the Commissioner's Cup, losing to the TNT Katropa in the first round. In the Governors' Cup, he had 7 steals in a win against the Phoenix Fuel Masters. He finished the elimination round with a Player of the Week award, for averaging 21 points, 5.5 rebounds, 5.5 assists and 1 steal in 2 games and securing first place for the Bolts. He was also nominated for Best Player of the Conference, losing to Greg Slaughter. Meralco lost once again to Ginebra in the Finals.

In the 2018 Commissioner's Cup, Newsome had 30 points in a win against NLEX. He was snubbed once again from the 2018 All-Star Games. He competed once again in the Slam Dunk Contest, but this time didn't make it to the final round.

In the 2019 Governors' Cup, against Phoenix, he recorded his first triple-double with 13 points, 12 rebounds, and 11 assists. Against San Miguel, he was dangerously fouled by Kelly Nabong as he was going for a drive. Nabong was fined 30,000 pesos for those actions. The Bolts made it to the Finals, matching up with Ginebra once again. In Game 1, he scored 17 of his 24 points in the fourth quarter. Despite his efforts, Meralco lost that game. They would go on to lose in 5 games.

In the 2020 Philippine Cup, Newsome hit a buzzer-beating, baseline fadeaway jumper to give Meralco the win over the Terrafirma Dyip. In the playoffs, they upset the Beermen, but lost to Ginebra in the semis.

In a game against the Magnolia Hotshots, Newsome sank the game-winning layup and finished with 14 points. During the 2021 Philippine Cup, Newsome, along with teammate Cliff Hodge, was placed into the league's health and safety protocols, forcing them to miss two games. In his return from protocols, he was fined 20,000 pesos for the flagrant foul 2 he committed against Anthony Semerad. The Bolts made it to the semis once again, but this time lost to Magnolia in six games. In the Governors' Cup playoffs, they matched up against Magnolia once again. In Game 2, he scored 18 points to help Meralco tie up the series 1–1. He then teamed up with his backcourt partner Chris Banchero to take Game 3. The Bolts finally put Magnolia away in Game 5, as he scored 18 points (11 in the fourth quarter), 12 assists, eight rebounds, three steals, and a block. For that performance, he was awarded Player of the Week. They faced Ginebra in the Finals once again, and lost in six games.

== National team career ==
Newsome was ineligible to play in most FIBA tournaments for the Philippines because of a rule that states players are eligible to play for their countries only if they acquired their respective passports before the age of 16. He was able to play for the Philippines in the 2019 SEA Games 3x3 tournament because of less restrictions. Along with teammates CJ Perez, Jason Perkins, and Moala Tautuaa, they helped the Philippines claim gold for that event, sweeping the tournament in the process.

In 2022, Newsome was cleared by FIBA to play as a local for the Philippines. He was given an exemption because he has been living in the Philippines for over 10 years. He made his national team debut during the fourth window of the 2023 FIBA World Cup qualifiers.

Newsome was included in the 21-man pool of the Philippines for the 2023 FIBA World Cup. However, he was not included in the 12-man final roster. He got to play in the 2022 Asian Games. In the gold medal game against Jordan, he scored 13 points while defending Jordan's naturalized player Rondae Hollis-Jefferson as the Philippines won its first Asian Games gold medal in basketball in 61 years.

== Career statistics ==
Legend
GP	Games played	MPG	Minutes per game	FG%	Field-goal percentage
3FG%	3-point field-goal percentage	4P%	4-point field-goal percentage	FT%	Free-throw percentage
RPG	Rebounds per game	APG	Assists per game	SPG	Steals per game
BPG	Blocks per game	PPG	Points per game	127	Career high

=== College ===
==== Elimination rounds ====
Year	Team	GP	MPG	FG%	3P%	FT%	RPG	APG	SPG	BPG	PPG
2013-14	Ateneo	14	30.1	.512	.235	.762	8.3	2.6	.6	.5	13.1
2014-15	Ateneo	14	30.4	.436	.462	.744	7.9	2.6	1.3	.9	13.5
Career		28	30.3	.473	.372	.752	8.3	2.6	.9	.7	13.3

==== Playoffs ====
Year	Team	GP	MPG	FG%	3P%	FT%	RPG	APG	SPG	BPG	PPG
2014-15	Ateneo	2	33.3	.636	1.000	.857	6.5	3.0	1.0	1.5	18.0
Career		2	33.3	.636	1.000	.857	6.5	3.0	1.0	1.5	18.0

=== PBA ===
As of the end of 2025–26 season

Year	Team	GP	MPG	FG%	3P%	4P%	FT%	RPG	APG	SPG	BPG	PPG
2015–16	Meralco	51	30.6	.480	.288	—	.758	4.7	3.9	1.0	.4	12.1
2016–17	Meralco	48	35.1	.450	.291	—	.760	6.0	5.0	1.2	.4	13.3
2017–18	Meralco	41	34.7	.427	.429	—	.846	5.5	5.0	.9	.3	13.9
2019	Meralco	45	35.8	.441	.283	—	.813	5.8	3.8	1.1	.3	14.6
2020	Meralco	18	36.3	.421	.250	—	.767	5.7	4.9	1.4	.4	13.9
2021	Meralco	40	34.8	.408	.320	—	.797	5.2	5.0	1.2	.4	13.0
2022–23	Meralco	38	35.3	.432	.373	—	.748	5.2	4.8	1.0	.1	14.9
2023–24	Meralco	39	35.5	.397	.289	—	.862	5.5	4.4	.9	.3	16.2
2024–25	Meralco	39	33.9	.454	.371	.083	.813	4.4	3.6	1.0	.4	16.0
2025–26	Meralco	46	32.0	.449	.391	.105	.839	3.5	3.1	1.0	.2	14.6
Career		405	34.2	.437	.336	.097	.804	5.1	4.3	1.1	.3	14.2

=== East Asia Super League ===
Year	Team	GP	MPG	FG%	3P%	FT%	RPG	APG	SPG	BPG	PPG
2024–25	(Philippines) Meralco	6	33.0	.438	.333	.842	3.0	4.4	1.6	1.0	14.6
Career		6	33.0	.438	.333	.842	3.0	4.4	1.6	1.0	14.6

=== Basketball Champions League Asia ===
Year	Team	GP	MPG	FG%	3P%	FT%	RPG	APG	SPG	BPG	PPG
2025	(Philippines) Meralco	3	27.5	.350	.200	.600	3.0	2.3	1.3	.0	6.3
Career		3	27.5	.350	.200	.600	3.0	2.3	1.3	.0	6.3

== Media and endorsements ==
Newsome was a columnist for the Philippine edition of NBA.com. He is also a photographer for the Bolts' social media accounts.

In 2018, he was named as a brand ambassador for TAG Heuer.
