= Baser Amer =

Filipino basketball player

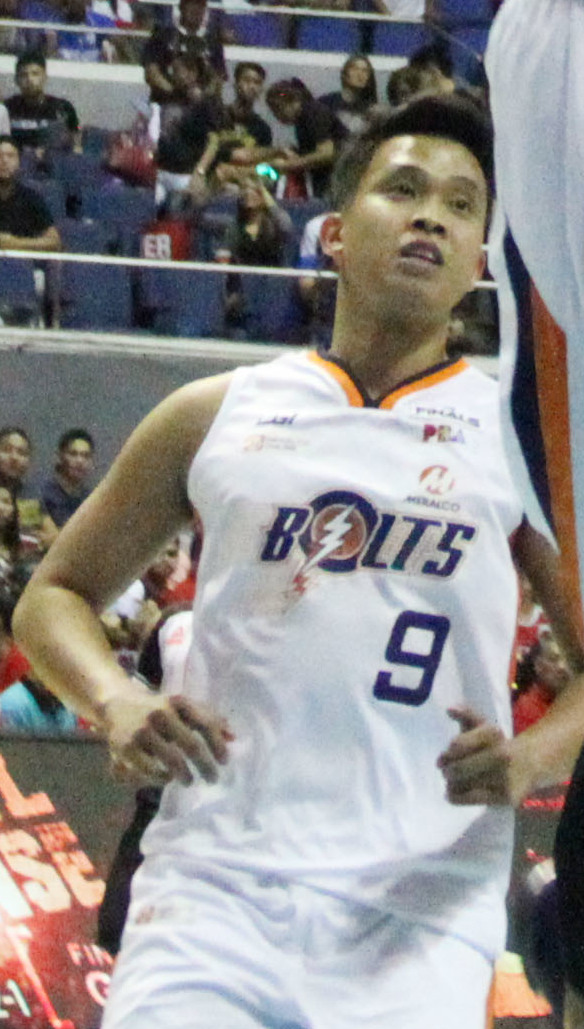
- Amer with the Meralco Bolts in 2020

Free agent
- Position: Point guard

Personal information
- Born: September 29, 1992 (age 34) Davao City, Philippines
- Listed height: 6 ft 0 in (1.83 m)
- Listed weight: 170 lb (77 kg)

Career information
- High school: Holy Child College of Davao (Davao City); San Beda-Rizal (Taytay, Rizal)
- College: San Beda (2011–2015)
- Drafted by: Meralco Bolts
- PBA draft: 2015: 1st round, 7th overall pick
- Playing career: 2015–present

Career history
- 2015–2020: Meralco Bolts
- 2021–2024: Blackwater Bossing
- 2024–2026: NLEX Road Warriors

Career highlights
- 3× PBA All-Star (2017–2019); PBA All-Star Game MVP (2018 Mindanao); 4x PBA D-League champion (2012–13 Aspirants', 2013–14 Aspirants', 2013–14 Foundation, 2014–15 Aspirants'); 4× NCAA Philippines champion (2011–2014); NCAA Philippines Finals MVP (2012); 2× PCCL champion (2014, 2015 (Note: San Beda is co-champions with FEU.)); PCCL Mythical Five (2014); 3x Father Martin Cup champion (2011 Division 2, 2011-12 Open, 2012-13 Open); Filoil Flying V Preseason Cup champion (2015)

Baser C. Amer (born September 29, 1992) is a Filipino professional basketball player who last played for the NLEX Road Warriors of the Philippine Basketball Association (PBA). He earned the moniker, The Hammer during his collegiate stint, and is still his moniker to this day.

He played as a point guard for the San Beda University Red Lions (then San Beda College) before being selected seventh overall in the 2015 PBA draft by Meralco. During his playing career with the San Beda Red Cubs, was a two-time NCAA Juniors' Basketball champion and was named 2009 NCAA Juniors' Rookie of the Year and 2010 NCAA Juniors' Finals Most Valuable Player. During his playing career with the Red Lions, he was a four-time NCAA Seniors' Basketball champion, and won the 2012 NCAA Finals Most Valuable Player award.

== Early life ==
Amer was born to a Muslim family in Davao City. He started playing basketball at age five, as his father wanted him to be a professional basketball player. At an early age, he was trained to play basketball against his father and brother, both of whom stand between 5'8" to 5'10". He idolized Jimmy Alapag even when he was a child.

== High school career ==
Amer played for the Holy Child College of Davao Reds from 2006 to 2009. During his time in Davao City, he was initially discovered by then-national youth head coach Eric Altamirano, who at that time, put up the National Basketball Training Center (NBTC) and held open tryouts. He joined the tryouts and was ranked Top 20 out of the pool of 150 players. He was also invited to the Nike Elite Camp where he was named to the Mythical Five and MVP. Then-San Beda Red Cub coach Ato Badolato discovered him in the Nike Camp and recruited him to play and study at San Beda.

He had to take a one-year residency period under NCAA rules before finally suiting up for the Red Cubs in 2009. In his rookie year, he steered the Red Cubs to their seventeenth NCAA Juniors title, their last one under coach Badolato. The following year, he won the Juniors season MVP while leading the Cubs to another title in 2010. He averaged 16.3 points, 8.5 rebounds, 11.7 assists per game in his final year with the Cubs.

== College career ==
Amer, now a highly sought-after prospect, was heavily recruited by several schools, but chose to stay at San Beda. Despite playing as backup point guard in his rookie year, he led the Lions in assists, with 4.5 per game average. He also helped the Red Lions to win another title in 2012 and was awarded the Finals MVP despite coming off the bench. Upon the graduation of Anjo Caram, he took the starting point guard slot and led the Lions to two more titles in 2013 and 2014 where thanks to the distribution of Amer, who already had an incredible 11 assists at the half, SBC slowly started to turn the tide of the ball game in their favor and went ahead by eight, 22–14, at the end of the first period in the pivotal Game 2.

He ended his college career failing to secure the six-peat for San Beda whilst being out of action for three months prior during the season after dislocating his right shoulder in a game against Letran. He reinjured his shoulder after hacking Letran guard Mark Cruz in the second quarter, resulting in a controversial foul being whistled at him.

Although he was unable to attain an ideal end to his college career, Baser left San Beda University (then San Beda College) with a wealth of experience and a grateful heart. Despite his loss to Letran, he finished with 14 points, 3 rebounds, 7 assists and one steal. He also played a pivotal factor in the closing minutes of the fourth quarter as he and fellow player Bedan Ola Adeogun sparked an 8–0 run to forge an overtime. Even though the Red Lions fell short in the 5-minute extension period, Amer stressed that he had no regrets for choosing San Beda and added that he would always be proud to be part of the Bedan community. “We may not be able to get the championship, but I have no regrets playing for San Beda” he wrote in an Instagram post. “My journey as a Red Lion ends, but I will always be a proud Bedan.”

=== College statistics ===
Year	Team	GP	MPG	FG%	3P%	FT%	RPG	APG	SPG	BPG	PPG
2011-12 †	San Beda	18	23.79	.372	TBC	TBC	4.8	5.7	1.42	0	4.5
2012-13 †	San Beda	18	26.9	.364	TBC	TBC	5	6.16	1	0	9.89
2013-14 †	San Beda	17	30.61	.363	TBC	TBC	4.3	8.2	2.6	0.2	14.3
2014-15 †	San Beda	16	33.81	.387	TBC	TBC	5.2	8.7	3	0.1	16.8
2015-16	San Beda	9	28.67	.412	.491	.76	4.9	7.25	2.3	0	10.2

== Amateur career ==
Amer joined the then-D-League powerhouse NLEX Road Warriors in 2012, where he was a part of three championship teams. When NLEX took the jump to the pros in 2014, he was signed by the Hapee Fresh Fighters and played alongside fellow college standouts and future draft batchmates Chris Newsome, Troy Rosario, Earl Scottie Thompson and Garvo Lanete.

== Professional career ==
Amer was picked seventh overall by the Meralco Bolts of the Philippine Basketball Association in the 2015 PBA draft. On October 30, 2015, it was announced by his agent, Charlie Dy via his Instagram account that Amer already signed his rookie deal with Meralco. In his PBA debut on November 4, 2015, went scoreless after missing all his four shots, adding just one assist and one board against two turnovers in 14 minutes of action. In his third game with the Bolts, he was thrust into the starting lineup, scoring 9 points (on 57% FG shooting), 3 rebounds, 6 assists in 30:55 minutes of action, in a losing effort against Barako Bull on November 15, 2015.

He was selected for both the 2017 and 2018 PBA All-Star Games, both playing for the Mindanao All-Stars. In 2018, Baser was named the All-Star Game MVP after delivering 22 points, 7 rebounds and 7 assists in the win.

On February 4, 2021, Amer, along with Bryan Faundo, was traded to the Blackwater Bossing for Mac Belo. On December 30, 2021, Amer signed a one-year contract extension with the Bossing. He signed another one-year contract extension with the team on December 29, 2022. The contract was supposed to end on December 31, 2023, but on the same day he signed a contract extension with the team until the end of the 2023–24 PBA Commissioner's Cup. He was left unsigned after the end of the conference and became an unrestricted free agent.

On February 13, 2024, Amer signed with the NLEX Road Warriors, reuniting him with his former college coach Frankie Lim.

== PBA career statistics ==
Legend
GP	Games played	MPG	Minutes per game	FG%	Field-goal percentage
3FG%	3-point field-goal percentage	4P%	4-point field-goal percentage	FT%	Free-throw percentage
RPG	Rebounds per game	APG	Assists per game	SPG	Steals per game
BPG	Blocks per game	PPG	Points per game	127	Career high

As of the end of 2024–25 season

=== Season-by-season averages ===
Year	Team	GP	MPG	FG%	3P%	4P%	FT%	RPG	APG	SPG	BPG	PPG
2015–16	Meralco	46	17.9	.378	.264	—	.809	1.7	1.6	.4	.1	5.5
2016–17	Meralco	47	29.1	.443	.397	—	.857	3.6	3.1	.8	.0	12.2
2017–18	Meralco	41	30.2	.429	.404	—	.776	4.0	4.4	.9	.1	12.4
2019	Meralco	44	28.2	.391	.374	—	.875	3.1	2.5	1.0	.1	12.1
2020	Meralco	18	23.7	.366	.340	—	.750	2.8	2.7	.4	—	9.0
2021	Blackwater	18	23.0	.296	.262	—	.762	2.4	2.4	.6	.1	7.1
2022–23	Blackwater	31	24.8	.414	.327	—	.813	1.9	2.9	.5	—	10.9
2023–24	Blackwater	17	18.0	.363	.241	—	.500	1.5	1.5	.4	.1	4.9
2023–24	NLEX	17	18.0	.363	.241	—	.500	1.5	1.5	.4	.1	4.9
2024–25	NLEX	22	12.4	.425	.324	.200	.750	1.3	1.3	.0	—	4.5
Career		284	24.2	.402	.347	.200	.812	2.7	2.6	.6	.1	9.4

== International career ==
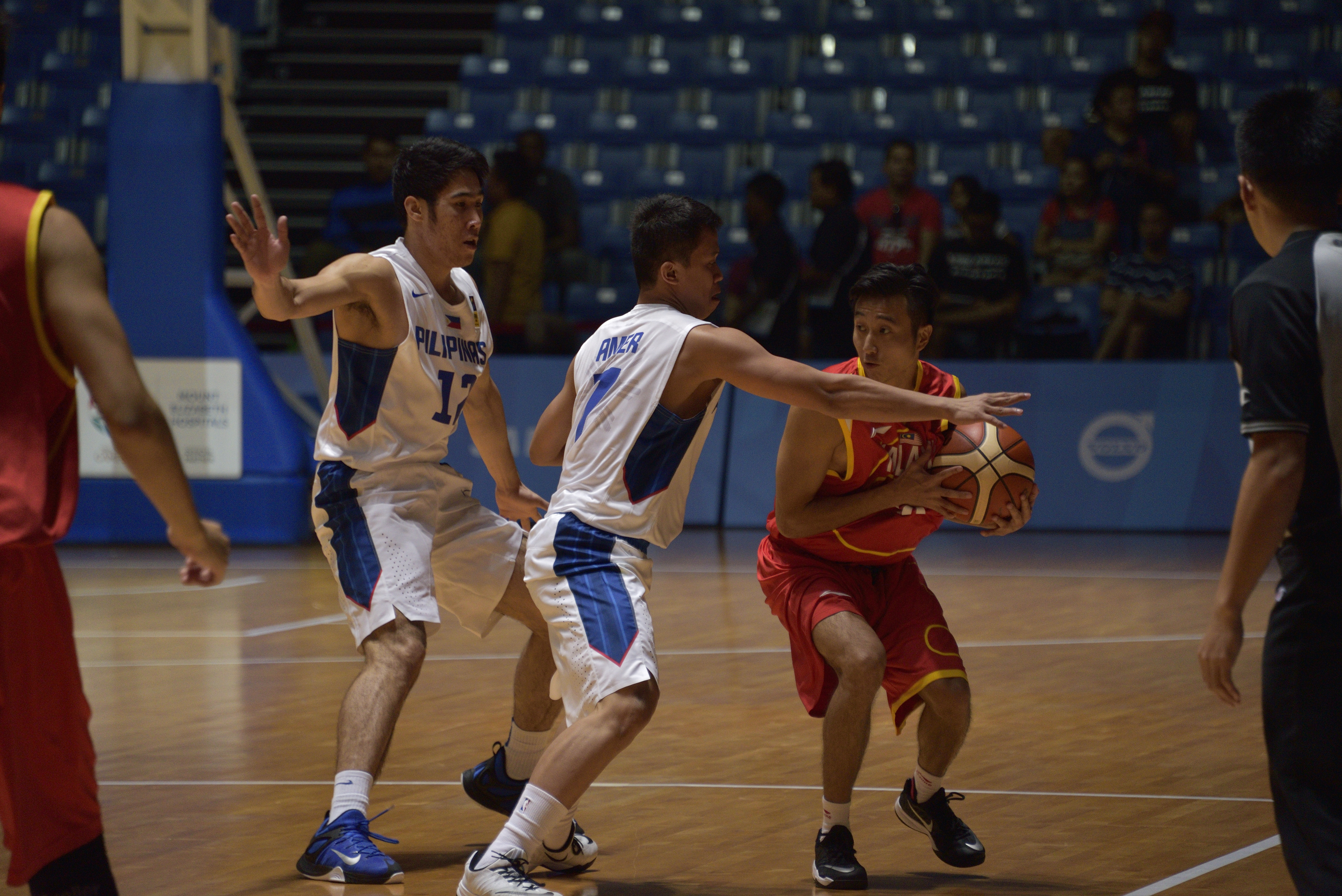
Amer guarding against Malaysia in the 2015 Southeast Asian Games.

Amer was part of the 12-man Sinag Pilipinas lineup that competed in the 2015 Southeast Asian Games basketball tournament held in Singapore, where they won the gold medal and the Gilas Cadets lineup that is currently competing in the 2017 Southeast Asian Games basketball tournament held in Kuala Lumpur, Malaysia.

He was included in the 15-man Gilas Pilipinas lineup for the third window of the 2019 FIBA World Cup Qualifiers. He was not selected to play in their first game against Chinese Taipei men's national basketball team. But, along with forward Carl Bryan Cruz, he completed for the national team against Australia, replacing Jio Jalalon and Allein Maliksi in. In his first game for the Gilas Pilipinas, nine players from the Philippines and four players from Australia were ejected during the 4:02 mark of the third quarter due to being involved in the free-for-all. Only three players, among of which was Amer, remained. After two of the three remaining players fouled out, Philippines lost the game against Australia by default with 1:57 left in the third quarter. Amer was the last man standing, with 3 points in 2 minutes.

=== International statistics ===
Year	Team	GP	MPG	FG%	3P%	FT%	RPG	APG	SPG	BPG	PPG
2017 Southeast Asian Games	Philippines	4	21.25	.329	.207	.916	3	5	0.5	0.25	7
2019 FIBA World Cup Qualifiers	Philippines	1	2.04	.500	.500	0	0	0	0	0	3
