= 2016–17 PBA Philippine Cup =

- Duration: November 20, 2016 – March 5, 2017
- TV partner(s): Local: Sports5; TV5; PBA Rush (HD); International: AksyonTV International

Finals
- Champions: San Miguel Beermen
- Runners-up: Barangay Ginebra San Miguel

Awards
- Best Player: June Mar Fajardo (San Miguel Beermen)
- Finals MVP: Chris Ross (San Miguel Beermen)

PBA Philippine Cup chronology
- < 2015–16 2017–18 >

PBA conference chronology
- < 2016 Governors' 2017 Commissioner's >

The 2016–17 Philippine Basketball Association (PBA) Philippine Cup, also known as the 2016–17 Oppo-PBA Philippine Cup for sponsorship reasons, was the first conference of the 2016–17 PBA season. The tournament started on November 20, 2016, and ended on March 5, 2017. The tournament does not allow teams to hire foreign players or imports.

== Format ==
The following format was observed for the duration of the conference:

- Single-round robin eliminations; 11 games per team; Teams are then seeded by basis on win–loss records.
- Top eight teams will advance to the quarterfinals. In case of tie, playoff games will be held only for the #8 seed.
- Quarterfinals:
  - QF1: #1 vs #8 (#1 twice-to-beat)
  - QF2: #2 vs #7 (#2 twice-to-beat)
  - QF3: #3 vs #6 (best-of-3 series)
  - QF4: #4 vs #5 (best-of-3 series)
- Semifinals (best-of-7 series):
  - SF1: QF1 Winner vs. QF4 Winner
  - SF2: QF2 Winner vs. QF3 Winner
- Finals (best-of-7 series)
  - F1: SF1 Winner vs SF2 Winner

== Elimination round ==
=== Team standings ===
Pos	Team	W	L	PCT	GB	Qualification
1	San Miguel Beermen	10	1	.909	—	Twice-to-beat in the quarterfinals
2	Alaska Aces	7	4	.636 (Note: Head-to-head record: Alaska 1–0 Star)	3	Twice-to-beat in the quarterfinals
3	Star Hotshots	7	4	.636	3	Best-of-three quarterfinals
4	TNT KaTropa	6	5	.545 (Note: Head-to-head quotient: TNT 1.09, GlobalPort 1.00, Phoenix 0.96, Barangay Ginebra 0.94.)	4	Best-of-three quarterfinals
5	GlobalPort Batang Pier	6	5	.545	4	Best-of-three quarterfinals
6	Phoenix Fuel Masters	6	5	.545	4	Best-of-three quarterfinals
7	Barangay Ginebra San Miguel	6	5	.545	4	Twice-to-win in the quarterfinals
8	Rain or Shine Elasto Painters	5	6	.455 (Note: Eighth seed playoff: Rain or Shine 103–80 Blackwater)	5	Twice-to-win in the quarterfinals
9	Blackwater Elite	5	6	.455	5	
10	Mahindra Floodbuster	3	8	.273 (Note: Head-to-head record: Mahindra 1–0 Meralco)	7	
11	Meralco Bolts	3	8	.273	7	
12	NLEX Road Warriors	2	9	.182	8	

Source: PBA.ph

=== Schedule ===
Team ╲ Game	1	2	3	4	5	6	7	8	9	10	11
Alaska Aces	NLEX	SMB	GP	MER	BGSM	TNT	SH	BWE	MAH	PHX	ROS
Barangay Ginebra San Miguel	TNT	ROS	GP	MAH	ALA	SH	SMB	MER	BWE	PHX	NLEX
Blackwater Elite	PHX	MER	TNT	ROS	NLEX	GP	MAH	SMB	ALA	BGSM	SH
GlobalPort Batang Pier	MAH	SH	ALA	BGSM	BWE	PHX	MER	NLEX	SMB	TNT	ROS
Mahindra Floodbuster	GP	ROS	PHX	SMB	BGSM	BWE	MER	TNT	ALA	NLEX	SH
Meralco Bolts	BWE	NLEX	TNT	ALA	PHX	SMB	GP	MAH	BGSM	ROS	SH
NLEX Road Warriors	ALA	MER	SH	BWE	SMB	ROS	TNT	GP	PHX	MAH	BGSM
Phoenix Fuel Masters	BWE	SMB	MAH	SH	TNT	MER	GP	ROS	NLEX	BGSM	ALA
Rain or Shine Elasto Painters	TNT	MAH	BGSM	BWE	SH	NLEX	PHX	SMB	MER	GP	ALA
San Miguel Beermen	SH	PHX	ALA	MAH	NLEX	MER	BWE	BGSM	ROS	GP	TNT
Star Hotshots	SMB	GP	NLEX	PHX	ROS	BGSM	ALA	TNT	BWE	MER	MAH
TNT KaTropa	ROS	BGSM	BWE	MER	PHX	ALA	NLEX	SH	MAH	GP	SMB

= Win; = OT win; = Loss; = OT loss

=== Results ===
Team	ALA	BGSM	BWE	GP	MAH	MER	NLEX	PHX	ROS	SMB	SH	TNT
Alaska		101–86	100–103	95–84	107–91	81–79	97–99*	106–85	94–89	88–93	97–90*	100–109
Barangay Ginebra	—		99–90	84–91	89–70	83–72	90–80	73–79	81–74	70–72	86–79	103–108
Blackwater	—	—		99–91	93–97*	86–84	96–85	94–87	93–107	93–118	95–111	92–99
GlobalPort	—	—	—		97–75	97–89	110–96	99–101	117–99	100–106	91–84	98–102
Mahindra	—	—	—	—		105–92	106–96	104–114	83–105	91–94	87–124	92–104
Meralco	—	—	—	—	—		106–93	90–94	82–72	86–101	73–120	98–87
NLEX	—	—	—	—	—	—		91–102	97–107	80–106	75–99	110–98
Phoenix	—	—	—	—	—	—	—		82–97	92–85	79–123	98–117
Rain or Shine	—	—	—	—	—	—	—	—		101–107*	91–99	101–87
San Miguel	—	—	—	—	—	—	—	—	—		96–88	98–94
Star	—	—	—	—	—	—	—	—	—	—		88–77
TNT	—	—	—	—	—	—	—	—	—	—	—	

Legend: Blue = left column team win; Red = top row team win.
Matches with lighter background shading were decided after overtime.

== Eighth seed playoff ==
February 3

Stats

Blackwater Elite 80, Rain or Shine Elasto Painters 103
Scoring by quarter: 16–16, 20–29, 20–23, 24–35
Pts: dela Cruz 20; Rebs: dela Cruz 9 Asts: Buenafe, Pinto 4	Pts: Washington 15; Rebs: Cruz 12; Asts: Chan 6

Smart Araneta Coliseum, Quezon City

== Bracket ==
Quarterfinals
(#1 twice-to-beat)
1	San Miguel	98
8	Rain or Shine	91
(best-of-3)
4	TNT	2
5	GlobalPort	0
(#2 twice-to-beat)
2	Alaska	81	97
7	Barangay Ginebra	85	108
(best-of-3)
3	Star	2
6	Phoenix	0

Semifinals (best-of-7)
1	San Miguel	4
4	TNT	3
7	Barangay Ginebra	4
3	Star	3

Finals (best-of-7)
1	San Miguel	4
7	Barangay Ginebra	1

== Quarterfinals ==
=== (1) San Miguel vs. (8) Rain or Shine ===
February 5

Stats

San Miguel Beermen 98, Rain or Shine Elasto Painters 91
Scoring by quarter: 28–21, 23–17, 23–29, 24–24
Pts: Garcia 25; Rebs: Fajardo 14; Asts: Ross 4	Pts: Belga 18; Rebs: Norwood, Washington 8 Asts: Chan 4
San Miguel wins series in one game

Ynares Center, Antipolo

=== (2) Alaska vs. (7) Barangay Ginebra ===
February 5

Stats

Alaska Aces 81, Barangay Ginebra San Miguel 85
Scoring by quarter: 23–13, 18–16, 13–33, 27–23
Pts: Abueva 20; Rebs: Abueva 10; Asts: Casio 5	Pts: Tenorio 16; Rebs: Aguilar 14; Asts: Mercado, Tenorio 6

Ynares Center, Antipolo
Attendance: 7,400

February 7

Stats

Alaska Aces 97, Barangay Ginebra San Miguel 108
Scoring by quarter: 25–21, 28–30, 18–31, 26–26
Pts: Abueva 29; Rebs: Abueva 13; Asts: Casio 4	Pts: Tenorio 31; Rebs: Aguilar, Thompson 9 Asts: Tenorio 3
Barangay Ginebra wins series in two games

Smart Araneta Coliseum, Quezon City

=== (3) Star vs. (6) Phoenix ===
February 4

Stats

Star Hotshots 114, Phoenix Fuel Masters 83
Scoring by quarter: 22–15, 23–36, 37–13, 32–19
Pts: Lee 22; Rebs: Pingris 14; Asts: Lee, Ramos 4	Pts: Wright 19; Rebs: Kramer 12; Asts: Dehesa, Intal 3

Mall of Asia Arena, Pasay

February 6

Stats

Star Hotshots 91, Phoenix Fuel Masters 71
Scoring by quarter: 22–18, 20–17, 23–14, 26–22
Pts: Lee 17; Rebs: Pingris 9 Asts: Lee 9	Pts: Wright 24; Rebs: W. Wilson 10; Asts: Intal 4
Star wins series, 2–0

Smart Araneta Coliseum, Quezon City

=== (4) TNT vs. (5) Globalport ===
February 4

Stats

TNT KaTropa 109, GlobalPort Batang Pier 101
Scoring by quarter: 24–34, 37–22, 25–15, 23–30
Pts: Castro 20; Rebs: Tautuaa 9 Asts: Ganuelas-Rosser 4	Pts: Romeo 28; Rebs: Quiñahan 6 Asts: Romeo 8

Mall of Asia Arena, Pasay

February 6

Stats

TNT KaTropa 95, GlobalPort Batang Pier 90
Scoring by quarter: 30–22, 18–19, 28–26, 19–23
Pts: de Ocampo 25; Rebs: Rosario 11; Asts: Castro 8	Pts: Romeo 22; Rebs: Maierhofer 10; Asts: Pringle 6
TNT wins series, 2–0

Smart Araneta Coliseum, Quezon City

== Semifinals ==
=== (1) San Miguel vs. (4) TNT ===
February 8

Stats

San Miguel Beermen 111, TNT KaTropa 98
Scoring by quarter: 32–16, 24–30, 27–27, 28–25
Pts: Lassiter 22; Rebs: Fajardo, Lassiter 8 Asts: Ross 10	Pts: Castro 27; Rebs: Tautuaa 7 Asts: Castro 8

Smart Araneta Coliseum, Quezon City

February 10

Stats

San Miguel Beermen 85, TNT KaTropa 87
Scoring by quarter: 15–20, 18–22, 26–23, 26–22
Pts: Fajardo 25; Rebs: Santos 12; Asts: Ross 7	Pts: Rosario 14; Rebs: de Ocampo 13; Asts: Castro 11

Mall of Asia Arena, Pasay

February 12

Stats

San Miguel Beermen 92, TNT KaTropa 98
Scoring by quarter: 30–25, 19–28, 23–19, 20–26
Pts: Cabagnot, Lassiter 18; Rebs: three players 9 Asts: Cabagnot 7	Pts: de Ocampo 24; Rebs: de Ocampo 9 Asts: Castro 12

Smart Araneta Coliseum, Quezon City

February 14

Stats

San Miguel Beermen 97, TNT KaTropa 86
Scoring by quarter: 18–19, 26–13, 32–26, 21–28
Pts: Ross 31; Rebs: Fajardo 15; Asts: Lassiter 10	Pts: Fonacier 15; Rebs: Ganuelas-Rosser, Williams 7 Asts: Castro, Reyes 5

Mall of Asia Arena, Pasay

February 16

Stats

San Miguel Beermen 94, TNT KaTropa 101
Scoring by quarter: 32–24, 8–26, 29–23, 25–28
Pts: Santos 18; Rebs: Fajardo 15; Asts: three players 4	Pts: three players 18; Rebs: three players 7 Asts: Castro 7

Smart Araneta Coliseum, Quezon City

February 18

Stats

San Miguel Beermen 104, TNT KaTropa 88
Scoring by quarter: 26–27, 19–26, 25–16, 34–19
Pts: Fajardo 23; Rebs: Fajardo 21; Asts: Cabagnot, Lassiter 7	Pts: Castro 19; Rebs: Reyes 9 Asts: Castro 5

Mall of Asia Arena, Pasay

February 20

Stats

San Miguel Beermen 96, TNT KaTropa 83
Scoring by quarter: 22–19, 19–20, 36–21, 19–23
Pts: Fajardo, Santos 22; Rebs: Fajardo 19; Asts: Ross 10	Pts: Fonacier 14; Rebs: Williams 14; Asts: Fonacier, Pogoy 4
San Miguel wins series, 4–3

Mall of Asia Arena, Pasay

=== (3) Star vs. (7) Barangay Ginebra ===
February 9

Stats

Star Hotshots 78, Barangay Ginebra San Miguel 74
Scoring by quarter: 19–14, 19–23, 20–23, 16–18
Pts: Lee 18; Rebs: Pingris 12; Asts: Pingris 5	Pts: Ellis 12; Rebs: Thompson 10; Asts: Tenorio 6

Smart Araneta Coliseum, Quezon City

February 11

Stats

Star Hotshots 91, Barangay Ginebra San Miguel 89
Scoring by quarter: 23–27, 22–23, 24–22, 20–19
Pts: Lee 17; Rebs: Pingris 8 Asts: Jalalon, Pingris 5	Pts: Ferrer 25; Rebs: Aguilar 15; Asts: Thompson 6

Mall of Asia Arena, Pasay

February 13

Stats

Star Hotshots 62, Barangay Ginebra San Miguel 73
Scoring by quarter: 21–10, 12–19, 17–22, 23–11
Pts: Pingris 12; Rebs: Pingris 18; Asts: Barroca 4	Pts: Mercado 16; Rebs: Aguilar 13; Asts: Mercado 6

Mall of Asia Arena, Pasay

February 15

Stats

Star Hotshots 86, Barangay Ginebra San Miguel 93
Scoring by quarter: 21–23, 27–18, 17–21, 28–24
Pts: Maliksi 18; Rebs: Pingris 13; Asts: Lee, Pingris 2	Pts: Cruz 21; Rebs: Thompson 14; Asts: Tenorio 5

Smart Araneta Coliseum, Quezon City

February 17

Stats

Star Hotshots 89, Barangay Ginebra San Miguel 80
Scoring by quarter: 22–21, 23–28, 10–22, 25–18
Pts: Reavis 17; Rebs: Reavis 13; Asts: Barroca 7	Pts: Aguilar 13; Rebs: Ferrer, Mercado 5 Asts: Ellis 4

Mall of Asia Arena, Pasay

February 19

Stats

Star Hotshots 67, Barangay Ginebra San Miguel 91
Scoring by quarter: 25–22, 13–17, 24–15, 29–13
Pts: Pingris 14; Rebs: Pingris 10; Asts: Barroca 4	Pts: Mercado 21; Rebs: Aguilar 10; Asts: Tenorio 5

Smart Araneta Coliseum, Quezon City
Attendance: 18,624

February 21

Stats

Star Hotshots 76, Barangay Ginebra San Miguel 89
Scoring by quarter: 26–16, 19–20, 20–25, 24–15
Pts: Maliksi 22; Rebs: Pingris, Ramos 8 Asts: Pingris 6	Pts: Mercado 23; Rebs: Thompson 9 Asts: Mercado, Tenorio 5
Barangay Ginebra wins series, 4–3

Mall of Asia Arena, Pasay
Attendance: 20,221

== Finals ==
February 24

Stats

San Miguel Beermen 109, Barangay Ginebra San Miguel 82

Mall of Asia Arena, Pasay

February 26

Stats

San Miguel Beermen 118, Barangay Ginebra San Miguel 124 (OT)

Quezon Convention Center, Lucena, Quezon

March 1

Stats

San Miguel Beermen 99, Barangay Ginebra San Miguel 88

Smart Araneta Coliseum, Quezon City

March 3

Stats

San Miguel Beermen 94, Barangay Ginebra San Miguel 85

Smart Araneta Coliseum, Quezon City

March 5

Stats

San Miguel Beermen 91, Barangay Ginebra San Miguel 85
San Miguel wins series, 4–1

Smart Araneta Coliseum, Quezon City

== Awards ==
=== Conference ===
- Best Player of the Conference: June Mar Fajardo (San Miguel Beermen)
- Finals MVP: Chris Ross (San Miguel Beermen)

=== Players of the Week ===
Week	Player	Ref.
November 20–27	Mac Belo (Blackwater Elite)	
November 28 – December 4	JC Intal (Phoenix Fuel Masters)	
December 5–11	Paul Lee (Star Hotshots)	
December 12–18	Vic Manuel (Alaska Aces)	
December 19–25	Alex Mallari (Mahindra Floodbuster)	
December 28 – January 8	Alex Cabagnot (San Miguel Beermen)	
January 9–15	Roi Sumang (Blackwater Elite)	
January 16–22	Matthew Wright (Phoenix Fuel Masters)	
January 23–29	Allein Maliksi (Star Hotshots)	
January 31 – February 4	Paul Lee (Star Hotshots)	

== Statistics ==
=== Individual statistical leaders ===
Category	Player	Team	Statistic
Points per game	Terrence Romeo	GlobalPort Batang Pier	28.2
Rebounds per game	June Mar Fajardo	San Miguel Beermen	14.1
Assists per game	Chris Ross	San Miguel Beermen	6.9
Steals per game	Chris Ross	San Miguel Beermen	2.6
Blocks per game	June Mar Fajardo	San Miguel Beermen	2.5
Turnovers per game	Alex Mallari	Mahindra Floodbuster	4.8
Fouls per game	Jewel Ponferada	Rain or Shine Elasto Painters	3.8
Fouls per game	Calvin Abueva	Alaska Aces	3.8
Minutes per game	Terrence Romeo	GlobalPort Batang Pier	36.8
FG%	Rafi Reavis	Star Hotshots	66.1%
FT%	Chris Tiu	Rain or Shine Elasto Painters	100.0%
3FG%	Russel Escoto	Mahindra Floodbuster	66.7%
Double-doubles	June Mar Fajardo	San Miguel Beermen	17

=== Individual game highs ===
Category	Player	Team	Statistic
Points	Terrence Romeo	GlobalPort Batang Pier	44
Rebounds	June Mar Fajardo	San Miguel Beermen	23
Assists	Jayson Castro	TNT KaTropa	12
Steals	Chris Ross (thrice)	San Miguel Beermen	6
Blocks	June Mar Fajardo	San Miguel Beermen	7
Three point field goals	Terrence Romeo (twice)	GlobalPort Batang Pier	8

=== Team statistical leaders ===
Category	Team	Statistic
Points per game	San Miguel Beermen	98.5
Rebounds per game	Rain or Shine Elasto Painters	50.2
Assists per game	Barangay Ginebra San Miguel	21.0
Steals per game	Star Hotshots	7.6
Blocks per game	San Miguel Beermen	5.1
Turnovers per game	NLEX Road Warriors	22.1
FG%	San Miguel Beermen	44.8%
FG%	GlobalPort Batang Pier	44.8%
FT%	GlobalPort Batang Pier	79.0%
3FG%	GlobalPort Batang Pier	37.6%
