= Jonathan Grey =

Filipino basketball player

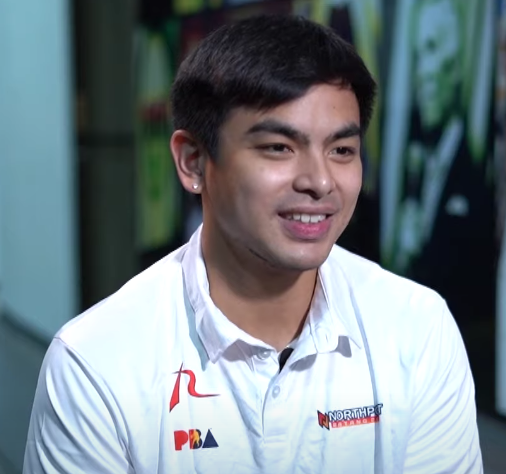
- Grey in 2022

Personal information
- Born: January 13, 1992 (age 34) Biñan, Laguna, Philippines
- Listed height: 6 ft 3 in (1.91 m)
- Listed weight: 190 lb (86 kg)

Career information
- High school: CSA Biñan (Biñan, Laguna)
- College: Benilde
- PBA draft: 2016: 2nd round, 7th overall pick
- Drafted by: Meralco Bolts
- Playing career: 2016–present
- Position: Small forward / shooting guard

Career history
- 2016–2017: Meralco Bolts
- 2017–2024: GlobalPort/NorthPort Batang Pier
- 2024–2025: Biñan Tatak Gel

Career highlights
- PBA All-Star (2017)

Jonathan Grey (born January 13, 1992) is a Filipino professional basketball player for the Biñan Tatak Gel of the Maharlika Pilipinas Basketball League (MPBL). He played for the Benilde Blazers of the NCAA when he was in college and previously played in the Philippine Basketball Association (PBA) for the Meralco Bolts and NorthPort Batang Pier.

== College career ==
Grey played for the Benilde Blazers as early as Season 87.

In Season 90, he was one of the notable snubs from the NCAA All-Star Game, despite averaging 11.8 points, 5.5 rebounds, 3.6 assists, and 1.9 steals. Still, he was chosen to participate in the Slam Dunk Contest. He scored 19 points in a win over the Perpetual Altas to end the first round of eliminations. Unfortunately, the Blazers didn't make the Final Four due to a loss to the Letran Knights.

In Season 91, Grey became the leader for the Blazers after Mark Romero and Paolo Taha turned pro. In a win against the San Sebastian Stags, he had 29 points, 8 rebounds, 6 assists, 3 steals, and 2 blocks. That season, he was able to win the All-Star Game MVP. In a win against the EAC Generals, he had a near triple-double, with 12 points, 9 rebounds, and 10 assists. After that season, he applied for the PBA Draft.

== PBA career ==
Grey applied for the 2015 PBA Draft, but his application was voided for not meeting the minimum requirement of D-League games played. He then applied for the 2016 Draft, where he was taken with the 7th pick by the Meralco Bolts.

=== Meralco Bolts ===
In his PBA debut, he had 11 points and 4 rebounds in a loss to the Blackwater Elite. He then had a PBA career-high of 24 points against the Phoenix Fuelmasters. He was able to play in the All-Star Game as a member of Gilas, leading them with 19 points against the Luzon All-Stars. His time with Meralco ended when he was traded to Globalport.

=== Globalport/NorthPort Batang Pier ===
Grey was among seven players involved in a trade with Meralco, the NLEX Road Warriors, the TNT Katropa, and the GlobalPort Batang Pier.

In his second season, Grey got to start for the Batang Pier when Terrence Romeo was injured, and scored 13 points in a loss to NLEX during the 2017-18 PBA Philippine Cup. He tied his career-high in points against his former team. In the Commissioner's Cup, he scored a conference high of 16 points in a win over the Columbian Dyip. In Game 1 of their quarterfinals series against the Rain or Shine Elasto Painters, he scored 22 points, including a game-winning three from the corner. However, they were eliminated the next game as he only scored 10 points. They didn't make the playoffs for the Governors' Cup, despite making the quarterfinals the previous two conferences.

In the 2019 season, he suffered a torn patellar tendon on his left knee, causing him to miss the rest of that season and the 2020 Philippine Cup.

Grey was able to play in the 2021 season before injuring his other patellar tendon.

== PBA career statistics ==
Legend
GP	Games played	MPG	Minutes per game
FG%	Field-goal percentage	3P%	3-point field-goal percentage	FT%	Free-throw percentage
RPG	Rebounds per game	APG	Assists per game	SPG	Steals per game
BPG	Blocks per game	PPG	Points per game	**Bold**	Career high

As of the end of the 2021 season

=== Season-by-season averages ===
Year	Team	GP	MPG	FG%	3P%	FT%	RPG	APG	SPG	BPG	PPG
2016–17	Meralco	26	10.9	.448	.222	.676	1.8	.9	.4	.1	4.6
2016–17	GlobalPort	26	10.9	.448	.222	.676	1.8	.9	.4	.1	4.6
2017–18	GlobalPort / NorthPort	**36**	18.8	.440	.293	.655	**2.7**	1.2	.6	**.2**	8.9
2019	NorthPort	17	**19.4**	**.463**	**.381**	.718	2.0	**1.6**	**1.1**	**.2**	**9.3**
2021	NorthPort	14	6.7	.355	.300	**.786**	1.2	.4	.0	.1	2.6
Career		93	14.9	.442	.300	.684	2.1	1.1	.5	.2	6.8
