= Alex Stepheson =

American basketball player (born 1987)

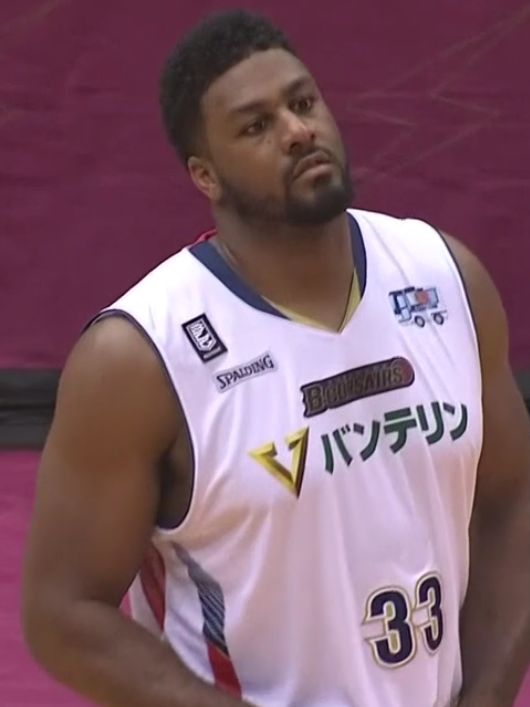
- Stepheson with the Yokohama B-Corsairs in 2018.

Personal information
- Born: August 7, 1987 (age 39) Los Angeles, California, U.S.
- Listed height: 6 ft 10 in (2.08 m)
- Listed weight: 249 lb (113 kg)

Career information
- High school: Harvard-Westlake (North Hollywood, California)
- College: North Carolina (2006–2008); USC (2009–2011)
- NBA draft: 2011: undrafted
- Playing career: 2011–2019
- Position: Power forward / center
- Number: 35, 33

Career history
- 2011–2012: Panionios
- 2013–2014: Union Olimpija
- 2014–2015: İstanbul BB
- 2015–2016: Iowa Energy
- 2016: Los Angeles Clippers
- 2016: Memphis Grizzlies
- 2016–2017: Guangzhou Long-Lions
- 2017: Meralco Bolts
- 2018–2019: Yokohama B-Corsairs
- 2019: Blackwater Elite
- 2019: Koshigaya Alphas

Career highlights
- All-NBA D-League First Team (2016); NBA D-League All-Star (2016); Slovenian Supercup winner (2013); Slovenian Supercup MVP (2013); Turkish League All-Star (2015); Fourth-team Parade All-American (2006)
- Stats at NBA.com
- Stats at Basketball Reference

Alexander Stepheson (pronounced Steevis-son; born August 7, 1987) is an American former professional basketball player who had a brief stint in the National Basketball Association (NBA) during his 8-year professional career. He played college basketball for the North Carolina Tar Heels and USC Trojans.

== High school career ==
Stepheson played high school basketball at Harvard-Westlake School in North Hollywood, Los Angeles, California, where he grabbed 20 or more rebounds in 16 games as a senior.

=== Awards and highlights ===
- Averaged 17.0 points, 14.4 rebounds, and 3.9 blocks as a junior.
- Led Harvard-Westlake School to a 26–4 mark and California Southern Sectional title in 2005.
- Averaged 20.4 points and 17.8 rebounds as a senior.
- Had a five-game streak with 32, 31, 23, 28, and 21 rebounds.
- Set a single-game school mark with 32 rebounds.
- Broke the school record for career rebounds in just three seasons (the previous record was held by former Stanford University center and NBA player Jason Collins).
- 2006 Fourth-team Parade All-American
- Named the Co-MVP of the East All-Stars at the 2006 Roundball Classic in Chicago, after he had 15 points and 9 rebounds.

== College career ==
Stepheson originally played college basketball for the University of North Carolina with the Tar Heels. At the end of 2007–08 season, Stepheson decided to transfer to the University of Southern California, citing family illness. He chose to play for the USC Trojans on July 17, 2008. In 2009, he was named Pac-10 Player of the Week, for the week of Dec. 14–20.

Stepheson played in the Reese's College All-Star Game, where he had 6 points and 7 rebounds. He also played in the Portsmith Invitational Tournament, where he averaged 8 point and 10 rebounds over three games.

== Professional career ==
=== Panionios (2011–2013) ===
After going undrafted in the 2011 NBA draft, Stepheson began his professional career in Greece, with the Greek League club Panionios. In the 2011–12 season, he averaged 10.3 points and 7.3 rebounds per game in 21 Greek League games. He then missed the entire 2012–13 season due to an injury he suffered with Panionios.

=== Union Olimpija (2013–2014) ===
In July 2013, Stepheson signed a one-year deal to play in Slovenia with Union Olimpija. In 20 Premier A Slovenian League games for Olimpija, Stepheson averaged 6.6 points and 5.2 rebounds per game. He also averaged 8.3 points and 5.7 rebounds per game in the Adriatic League.

=== İstanbul BB (2014–2015) ===
In July 2014, Stepheson joined the Sacramento Kings for the 2014 NBA Summer League. He later signed in Turkey with the Turkish League club İstanbul BB for the 2014–15 season. In 29 games in the Turkish League, he averaged 12.3 points and 9.2 rebounds per game.

=== NBA and D-League (2015–2016) ===
In July 2015, Stepheson joined the Dallas Mavericks for the 2015 NBA Summer League. On October 7, 2015, he signed with the Memphis Grizzlies. However, he was waived on October 24 after appearing in three preseason games. On October 31, he was acquired by the Iowa Energy of the NBA Development League as an affiliate player of the Grizzlies. On November 14, he made his debut with Iowa in a 98–95 win over the Sioux Falls Skyforce, recording 13 points, 17 rebounds, two assists and one steal in 37 minutes. On January 29, 2016, he was named in the East All-Star team for the 2016 NBA D-League All-Star Game after averaging 15.7 points, 13.3 rebounds, 1.3 blocks and 34.3 minutes in 26 games.

On February 20, 2016, Stepheson signed a 10-day contract with the Los Angeles Clippers. He made his NBA debut later that night in a 115–112 loss to the Golden State Warriors, recording one rebound in two minutes. Two days later, Stepheson scored his first basket on a tip-in against the Phoenix Suns and also his first block after rejecting Jon Leuer. On March 2, he signed a second 10-day contract with the Clippers. Following the expiration of his second 10-day contract, the Clippers parted ways with Stepheson.

On March 12, 2016, Stepheson signed a 10-day contract with the Memphis Grizzlies to help the team deal with numerous injuries. Memphis had to use an NBA hardship exemption in order to sign him as he made their roster stand at 17, two over the allowed limited of 15. In just his second game for the Grizzlies on March 14, Stepheson recorded 12 points and 15 rebounds in 25 minutes off the bench against the Houston Rockets, playing extended minutes due to the team's injury depleted roster. On March 22, following the conclusion of his 10-day contract, the Grizzlies parted ways with Stepheson. The following day, he returned to Iowa. At the season's end, he was named to the All-NBA D-League First Team.

=== China and Philippines (2016–2017) ===
In July 2016, Stepheson joined the Grizzlies for the 2016 NBA Summer League. On November 15, 2016, Stepheson signed with Guangzhou Long-Lions of the Chinese Basketball Association. That day he made his debut for Guangzhou in a 99–89 loss to the Xinjiang Flying Tigers, recording 10 points, 14 rebounds, one assist, one steal and one block in 21 minutes off the bench.

In February 2017, he was signed by the Meralco Bolts as their import for the 2017 PBA Commissioner's Cup.

=== Yokohama B-Corsairs (2018–2019) ===
On December 7, 2018, Stepheson signed with Yokohama B-Corsairs of the Japanese basketball league B.League. Stepheson averaged 15.2 ppg and led the Japanese basketball league B.League in rebounding with 13.6 rpg.

=== Blackwater Elite (2019) ===
Stepheson signed with the Blackwater Elite of the PBA.

Stepheson averaged 22 ppg and 22 rpg for Blackwater Elite.

== NBA Career statistics ==
Legend
GP	Games played	GS	Games started	MPG	Minutes per game
FG%	Field goal percentage	3P%	3-point field goal percentage	FT%	Free throw percentage
RPG	Rebounds per game	APG	Assists per game	SPG	Steals per game
BPG	Blocks per game	PPG	Points per game	**Bold**	Career high

=== Regular season ===
Year	Team	GP	GS	MPG	FG%	3P%	FT%	RPG	APG	SPG	BPG	PPG
2015–16	L.A. Clippers	**4**	0	3.0	**1.000**	–	.000	.5	.0	.0	.5	.5
2015–16	Memphis	**4**	0	**15.3**	.308	–	.400	**6.5**	**.5**	**.3**	**.8**	**5.0**
Career		8	0	9.0	.333	.000	.333	3.5	.3	.1	.6	2.8

== International Career Statistics ==
Legend
GP	Games played	MPG	Minutes per game	FG%	Field goal percentage
3P%	3-point field goal percentage	FT%	Free throw percentage	RPG	Rebounds per game
APG	Assists per game	SPG	Steals per game	BPG	Blocks per game
PPG	Points per game	**Bold**	Career high		Led the league

Year	Team	League	GP	MPG	FG%	3P%	FT%	RPG	APG	SPG	BPG	PPG
2011–12	Panionios B.C.	EuroCup	21	23.4	.623	1.000	.535	7.3	.8	.4	.9	10.3
2013–14	Union Olimpija	Liga Aba	26	17.4	.560	.000	.384	5.7	.2	.5	1.0	8.3
2013–14	Union Olimpija	SKL	20	16.4	.485	.000	.562	5.2	.3	.2	.6	6.6
2013–14	Union Olimpija	EuroCup	16	17.3	.637	.000	.358	6.3	.3	.3	.9	8.4
2014–15	Istanbul BB	TBL	29	26.8	.563	.000	.437	9.2	.9	.3	.9	12.3
Career			112	20.8	.571	.200	.462	6.9	.5	.3	.9	9.4

== The Basketball Tournament ==
Alex Stepheson played for Sons of Westwood in the 2018 edition of The Basketball Tournament. Sons of Westwood made it to the Super 16 before falling to Team Challenge ALS.

== Acting career ==
Stepheson made his acting debut in the critically acclaimed TV Series, The Perfect Plan in 2018.

== See also ==
- 2006 high school boys basketball All-Americans
