= 2014 Philippine Collegiate Championship =

Men's Finals	G1	G2	Wins
De La Salle Green Archers	81	67	0
San Beda Red Lions	88	73	2
- Duration: November 27–December 1, 2014
- Arena(s): Ynares Sports Arena
- Finals MVP: Ola Adeogun
- Winning coach: Adonis Tierra
- TV network(s): ABS-CBN Sports and Action

The 2014 Philippine Collegiate Championship was the seventh edition of the Philippine Collegiate Champions League (PCCL) in its current incarnation, the postseason tournament to determine the national collegiate champions in basketball organized by the Samahang Basketbol ng Pilipinas (SBP), the national basketball federation. The tournament was the seventh edition in its current incarnation, and the twelfth edition overall

The San Beda Red Lions defeated defending champions De La Salle Green Archers in the best-of-three championship series, 2–0; meanwhile the UV Green Lancers defeated the USC Warriors in the third-place game, 63–60.

== Qualifying ==
#	UAAP	NCAA	CESAFI	Zonals
1st	NU Bulldogs	San Beda Red Lions	USC Warriors	various
2nd	FEU Tamaraws	Arellano Chiefs	SWU Cobras	—
3rd	De La Salle Green Archers	JRU Heavy Bombers	—	—
4th	Ateneo Blue Eagles*	Perpetual Altas	—	—

*Replaced by CEU.

Qualified to Elite Eight
Qualified to regionals
Qualified to zonals

== Regionals ==
=== Luzon–Metro Manila ===
The rounds were held at the First Asia Institute of Technology and Humanities (FAITH) Gym in Tanauan, Batangas from November 7 to 10.

==== First 3 rounds ====
Zonal Finals
St. Clare	74
Lyceum of Subic Bay	59
Diliman College	65
NCF	54

Quarterfinals
CEU	78
Perpetual	72
St. Clare	58
Diliman College	47

Semifinals
CEU	68
St. Clare	56
Third place
La Salle	67
JRU	62

==== Semifinals ====
November 9

De La Salle Green Archers	67–62	JRU Heavy Bombers

FAITH, Tanauan, Batangas

November 9

CEU Scorpions	68–56	St. Clare Saints

FAITH, Tanauan, Batangas

==== Finals ====
November 10

De La Salle Green Archers	79–56	CEU Scorpions

FAITH, Tanauan, Batangas

=== Visayas–Mindanao ===
==== Quarterfinals ====
October 13

UNO-R Rams	75–69	HTC Wildcats

Cebu Coliseum, Cebu City

==== Semifinals ====
October 14

USJ–R Jaguars	88–82	UNO-R Rams

Cebu Coliseum, Cebu City

==== Finals ====
October 16

UV Green Lancers	56–55	USJ–R Jaguars

Cebu Coliseum, Cebu City

== Elite Eight ==
Teams from Group A will battle against teams from Group B

=== Team standings ===
==== Group A ====
Pos	Team	Pld	W	L	PCT	GB	Qualification
1	De La Salle Green Archers	4	4	0	1.000	—	Qualified to the Finals
2	USC Warriors	4	3	1	.750	1	Qualified to third place match
3	Arellano Chiefs	4	2	2	.500	2	
4	NU Bulldogs	4	1	3	.250	3	

==== Group B ====
Pos	Team	Pld	W	L	PCT	GB	Qualification
1	San Beda Red Lions	4	3	1	.750	—	Qualified to the Finals
2	UV Green Lancers	4	2	2	.500	1	Qualified to third place match
3	FEU Tamaraws	4	2	2	.500	1	
4	SWU Cobras	4	0	4	.000	3	

==== Results ====
Team	AU	DLSU	FEU	NU	SBC	SWU	USC	UV
Arellano			72–84		68–87		77–61	88–95
La Salle			74–61		61–56	59–54		74–64
FEU				60–58		74–88		
NU					62–75	85–68		74–77
San Beda							86–75	
SWU							68–74	
USC								78–74
UV								

Legend: Blue = left column team win; Red = top row team win.

== Third-place playoff ==
December 1

USC Warriors	60–63	UV Green Lancers

Ynares Sports Arena, Pasig

== Finals ==
November 27

De La Salle Green Archers	81–88	San Beda Red Lions

Ynares Sports Arena, Pasig

December 1

De La Salle Green Archers	67–73	San Beda Red Lions
San Beda wins series 2–0

Ynares Sports Arena, Pasig
