= Ranidel de Ocampo =

Filipino basketball player (born 1981)

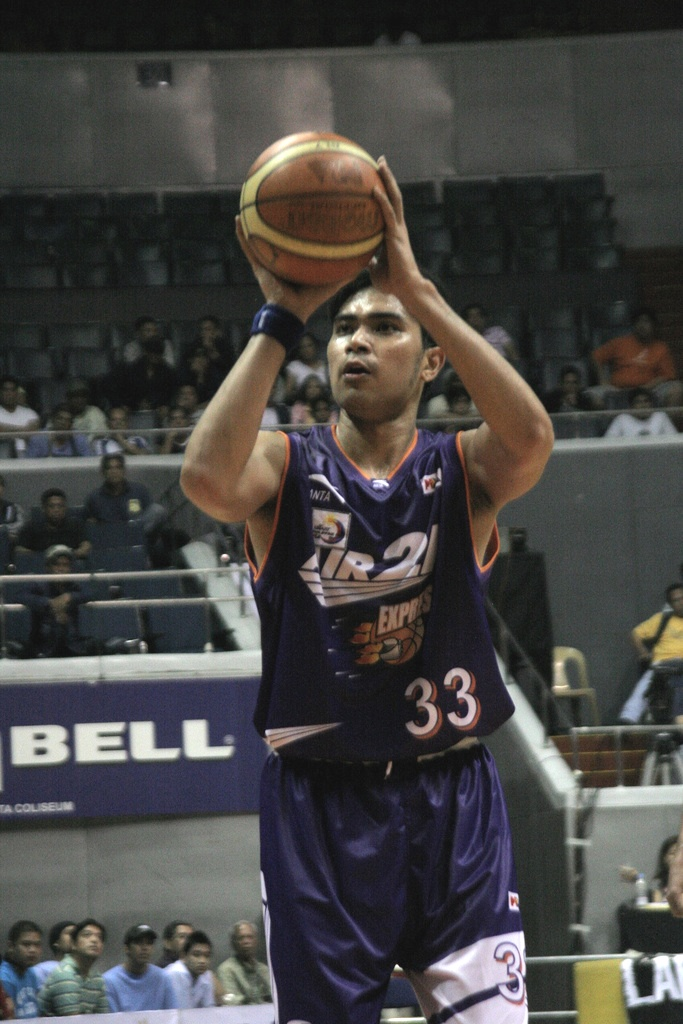
- de Ocampo with the Air21 Express in 2007

TNT Tropang 5G
- Title: Assistant coach
- League: PBA

Personal information
- Born: December 8, 1981 (age 44) Tanza, Cavite, Philippines
- Listed height: 6 ft 6 in (1.98 m)
- Listed weight: 225 lb (102 kg)

Career information
- College: St. Francis
- PBA draft: 2004: 1st round, 4th overall pick
- Drafted by: FedEx Express
- Playing career: 2004–2019
- Position: Power forward / Small forward
- Coaching career: 2020–present

Career history

Playing
- 2004–2008: FedEx Express / Air21 Express
- 2008–2017: Talk 'N Text Tropang Texters / TNT Tropang Texters / Tropang TNT / TNT KaTropa
- 2017–2019: Meralco Bolts

Coaching
- 2020–present: TNT Tropang Giga/5G (assistant)

Career highlights
- As player: 6× PBA champion (2008–09 Philippine, 2010–11 Philippine, 2011 Commissioner's, 2011–12 Philippine, 2012–13 Philippine, 2015 Commissioner's); 2× PBA Finals MVP (2012–13 Philippine, 2015 Commissioner's); PBA Best Player of the Conference (2014 Governors'); 9× PBA All-Star (2007–2011, 2013, 2014, 2016, 2017); 3× PBA Mythical First Team (2012–2014); PBA Mythical Second Team (2015); PBA All-Rookie Team (2004–05); No. 33 retired by the TNT Tropang 5G; As assistant coach: 4× PBA champion (2021 Philippine, 2023 Governors', 2024 Governors', 2024–25 Commissioner's)

Ranidel Rozal de Ocampo (born December 8, 1981) is a Filipino former professional basketball player and assistant coach for the TNT Tropang 5G of the Philippine Basketball Association (PBA). He played for FedEx and Talk 'N Text as well as the Philippine national basketball team. He is the younger brother of basketball player Yancy de Ocampo.

== College career ==
De Ocampo started playing organized basketball at the Saint Francis of Assisi College System Doves together with his brother, Yancy. The De Ocampo brothers led the varsity squad to several NCRAA titles. Upon the exit of the older De Ocampo, the Doves were still dominating the league with him, alongside Ervin Sotto and Al Vergara. Thus, he led the squad into several statistical categories such as scoring and rebounding. He won four NCRAA MVP plums making him arguably the finest player in the history of the NCRAA.

== Professional career ==
In 2004, after a celebrated collegiate career at St. Francis, De Ocampo decided to turn pro and enter the PBA draft. He was selected by the FedEx Express as the fourth overall pick, having selected ahead of higher profile players such as decorated UE point guard Paul Artadi, multi-titled PBL veteran Gary David and former Ateneo Blue Eagles star Wesley Gonzales.

During his rookie year, he played alongside his brother Yancy. He played in a total of 59 games and averaged decent rookie numbers of 7.5 points and 4.6 rebounds while playing a little over 21 minutes of action per game.

After a so-so performance in his first year, he made an impact in the 2005–06 season by improving his rookie numbers of 7.5 points per game to 13.3 in his sophomore year in 37 of 51 games played. He also registered 6.7 rebounds and 2.4 assists in that year.

In 2008, de Ocampo was again included in the RP Training Pool, his second stint, assembled by the PBA under Coach Yeng Guiao.

In the middle of the 2008–09 PBA Philippine Cup, he was traded to the Talk 'N Text Tropang Texters for veteran Don Allado. His all-around play helped them beat the Alaska Aces in that conference's finals series, 4–3, earning him his first PBA title.

In 2015, de Ocampo led the Texters to the 2015 PBA Commissioner's Cup championship, winning a seven-game series against Rain or Shine Elasto Painters. On April 29, 2015, de Ocampo was named as the Finals MVP. During the series, he averaged 24.3 points and 6.6 rebounds and as well as shooting at an impressive 40% from the three-point area over the course of seven games.

On September 11, 2017, de Ocampo was dealt to the Meralco Bolts along with KaTropa's 2019 second-round pick for Justin Chua and Norbert Torres in a three-team trade with Phoenix and Meralco.

On April 13, 2020, de Ocampo announced his retirement from professional basketball.

== PBA career statistics ==
Legend
GP	Games played	MPG	Minutes per game
FG%	Field-goal percentage	3P%	3-point field-goal percentage	FT%	Free-throw percentage
RPG	Rebounds per game	APG	Assists per game	SPG	Steals per game
BPG	Blocks per game	PPG	Points per game	**Bold**	Career high

=== Season-by-season averages ===
Year	Team	GP	MPG	FG%	3P%	FT%	RPG	APG	SPG	BPG	PPG
2004–05	FedEx	59	21.3	**.585**	.313	.702	4.6	1.2	.5	.3	7.5
2005–06	Air21	51	30.4	.483	.377	.763	6.7	2.4	**.8**	.3	13.3
2006–07	Air21	22	33.7	.510	.370	.750	**9.2**	**3.1**	.6	.5	**15.3**
2007–08	Air21	51	**34.0**	.419	.290	.680	7.2	2.5	**.8**	.4	12.4
2008–09	Air21	45	31.0	.447	.342	.750	8.0	2.8	**.8**	.4	12.0
2008–09	Talk 'N Text	45	31.0	.447	.342	.750	8.0	2.8	**.8**	.4	12.0
2009–10	Talk 'N Text	47	26.8	.504	.333	.783	6.4	1.8	.5	.3	12.5
2010–11	Talk 'N Text	49	23.4	.441	.400	.689	4.9	1.9	.6	.2	11.9
2011–12	Talk 'N Text	54	24.0	.408	.364	.811	4.5	1.4	.4	.3	11.8
2012–13	Talk 'N Text	53	27.2	.439	.359	.748	6.3	1.6	.3	.3	12.7
2013–14	Talk 'N Text	46	31.1	.424	**.409**	.820	6.6	1.5	.6	**.7**	15.2
2014–15	Talk 'N Text	48	29.1	.470	.402	.693	5.8	2.2	.7	.5	15.1
2015–16	TNT	30	28.2	.471	.348	.766	6.2	2.6	.7	.3	12.6
2016–17	TNT	**61**	23.0	.427	.322	**.830**	4.8	1.8	.5	.4	10.3
2016–17	Meralco	**61**	23.0	.427	.322	**.830**	4.8	1.8	.5	.4	10.3
2017–18	Meralco	11	20.3	.370	.233	.750	4.1	1.4	.3	.3	7.2
2019	Meralco	20	19.6	.333	.298	.667	4.3	2.1	.5	.2	6.9
Career		647	27.1	.452	.354	.752	5.9	2.0	.6	.4	12.0

== National team career ==
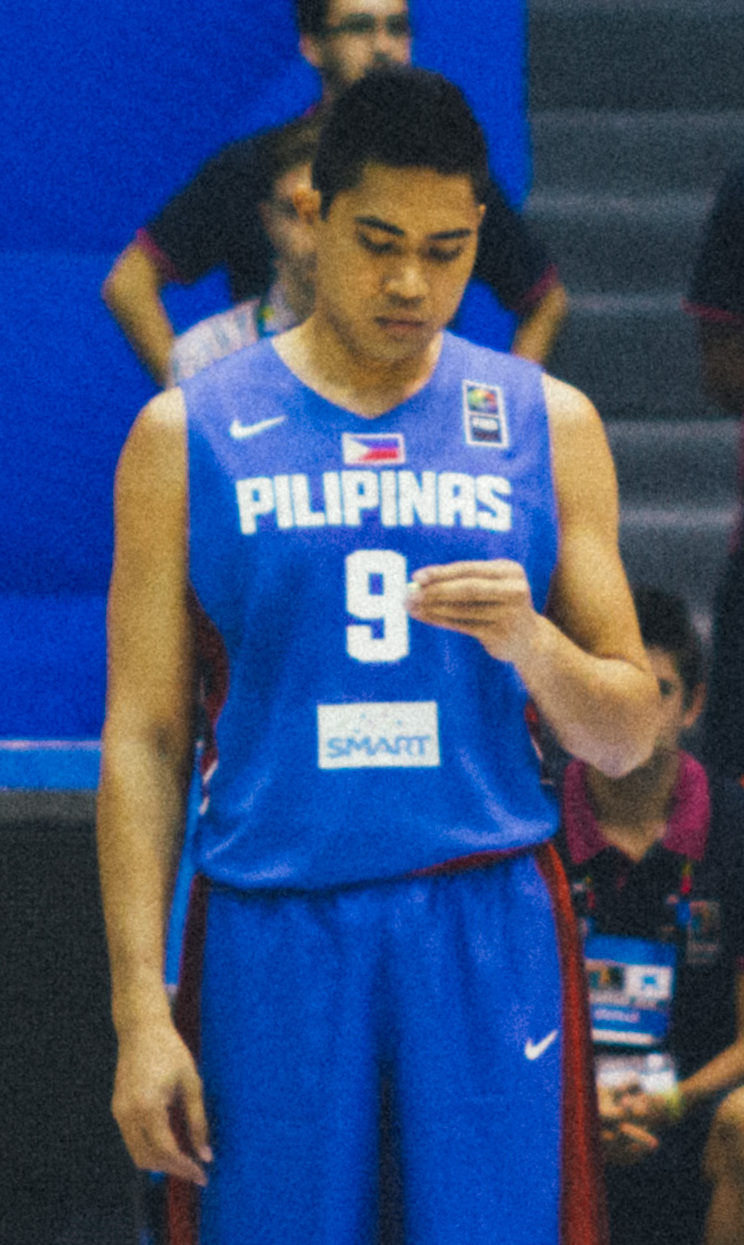
De Ocampo at the 2014 FIBA Basketball World Cup

He was included in the Gilas Pilipinas roster that placed second in the 2013 FIBA Asia Championship held in Manila and earned a ticket to compete in the 2014 FIBA Basketball World Cup. De Ocampo also buried a crucial three point field goal late in the fourth quarter which secured Gilas a slot in the 2014 World Cup. In July 2016, de Ocampo announced his retirement from international basketball following the Gilas' loss to the New Zealand men's national basketball team that ended their bid to qualify for the 2016 Summer Olympics.

== Coaching career ==
On June 29, 2020, de Ocampo was tapped as an assistant coach of TNT KaTropa.

== Personal life ==
His son Ranidel Jr. was a youth collegiate and national basketball player who eventually transitioned to volleyball.

== Career achievements ==
- 6-time PBA champion (2008–09 Philippine, 2010–11 Philippine, 2011 Commissioner's, 2012–13 Philippine, 2012–13 Philippine, 2015 Commissioner's)
- 2-time PBA Finals MVP (2012–13 Philippine, 2015 Commissioner's)
- 5-time National Team member
- 2004–05 PBA All-Rookie Team
- 2000 PBL Chairman's New Top Comer
- 2002 PBL Mythical Team
- Member of eight-time NCRAA champions Saint Francis of Assisi College System
- 4-time NCRAA MVP
