= Carl Bryan Cruz =

Filipino basketball player

Personal information
- Born: August 21, 1991 (age 35)
- Listed height: 6 ft 4 in (1.93 m)
- Listed weight: 200 lb (91 kg)

Career information
- High school: Faith Christian Academy (Quezon City)
- College: FEU
- PBA draft: 2016: Special draft
- Drafted by: Alaska Aces
- Playing career: 2016–present
- Position: Power forward

Career history
- 2016–2019: Alaska Aces
- 2019–2021: Blackwater Elite / Blackwater Bossing
- 2021–2024: TNT Tropang Giga
- 2024: Manila SV Batang Sampaloc
- 2025: Parañaque Patriots
- 2025: Zamboanga Sikat

Career highlights
- PBA champion (2023 Governors'); 2× PBA All-Star (2017, 2018)

Carl Bryan Villegas Cruz (born August 21, 1991), also known by his initials CBC, is a Filipino professional basketball former player for the Zamboanga Sikat of the Maharlika Pilipinas Basketball League (MPBL).

== Professional career ==
Cruz was selected in the special draft of the 2016 PBA draft by the Alaska Aces.

On September 6, 2019, he was traded to the Blackwater Elite for Abu Tratter.

On December 3, 2021, he was traded to the TNT Tropang Giga for Jay Washington and two future second-round picks. He signed a one-year extension with the team on January 26, 2022. He signed another one-year contract extension with the team on May 16, 2023.

== PBA career statistics ==
Legend
GP	Games played	MPG	Minutes per game
FG%	Field-goal percentage	3P%	3-point field-goal percentage	FT%	Free-throw percentage
RPG	Rebounds per game	APG	Assists per game	SPG	Steals per game
BPG	Blocks per game	PPG	Points per game	**Bold**	Career high

As of the end of 2023–24 season

=== Season-by-season averages ===
Year	Team	GP	MPG	FG%	3P%	FT%	RPG	APG	SPG	BPG	PPG
2016–17	Alaska	23	12.7	.350	.286	.655	3.4	.4	**.4**	—	4.5
2017–18	Alaska	27	12.4	.385	.316	.714	2.8	.4	.3	.2	4.1
2019	Alaska	**37**	**20.6**	.354	.333	**.804**	**3.6**	**.8**	.2	**.3**	**8.1**
2019	Blackwater	**37**	**20.6**	.354	.333	**.804**	**3.6**	**.8**	.2	**.3**	**8.1**
2021	Blackwater	10	19.5	.365	.349	.700	2.0	.6	.3	.2	6.0
2021	TNT	10	19.5	.365	.349	.700	2.0	.6	.3	.2	6.0
2022–23	TNT	24	5.6	.314	.229	.800	.7	.3	—	—	1.8
2023–24	TNT	6	5.2	**.600**	**.571**	.500	1.8	.2	—	—	2.8
Career		127	13.9	.360	.321	.741	2.6	.5	.2	.1	5.0
