= 2017 PBA All-Star Week =

- Date: April 26–30, 2017
- Venue: Xavier University Gymnasium, Cagayan de Oro; Quezon Convention Center, Lucena; Hoops Dome, Lapu-Lapu City
- Network: TV5

The 2017 PBA All-Star Week was the annual all-star week of the Philippine Basketball Association (PBA)'s 2016–17 season which was on April 26 to 30, 2017 on three different venues covering Luzon, Visayas and Mindanao. The all-star week kicked off in Cagayan de Oro (Mindanao) on April 26, then was held in Lucena (Luzon) together with the skills challenge on April 28, then capped off on April 30 in Cebu City.

Three PBA All-Star teams, one each with players representing Luzon, Visayas and Mindanao pitted against Gilas Pilipinas, the men's national basketball team. Gilas Pilipinas players played for the PBA All-Star team if they hail to the game's host region.

== Mindanao leg ==
=== Shooting Stars Challenge ===
Team Name	Members	Time
Team Khobuntin	Glenn Khobuntin	1:09.7
Team Khobuntin	Mayor Emmanuel Mugot	1:09.7
Team Khobuntin	Marcelo Balermo	1:09.7
Team Jalalon	Jio Jalalon	1:32
Team Jalalon	Mayor Oscar Moreno Jr.	1:32
Team Jalalon	Oscar Moreno III	1:32
Team Baguio	Cyrus Baguio	1:45.7
Team Baguio	Mayor Ed Ayunting	1:45.7
Team Baguio	Ronelo Pelegrino	1:45.7

=== All-Star Game ===
==== Roster ====
PBA Mindanao All-Stars
Pos	Player	Team	No. of selections
G	Mark Barroca	Star Hotshots	5
G	Scottie Thompson	Barangay Ginebra San Miguel	2
G	Peter June Simon	Star Hotshots	6
F/C	Rafi Reavis	Star Hotshots	3
F	Mac Belo	Blackwater Elite	1
G	Jio Jalalon	Star Hotshots	1
G/F	Cyrus Baguio	Phoenix Fuel Masters	9
F/C	Moala Tautuaa	TNT KaTropa	1
C	Sonny Thoss	Alaska Aces	11
G	Carlo Lastimosa	NLEX Road Warriors	2
F	Glenn Khobuntin	NLEX Road Warriors	2
G	Baser Amer	Meralco Bolts	1
F/C	Troy Rosario	TNT KaTropa	2
Head coach: Chito Victolero (Star Hotshots)

Gilas Pilipinas
Pos	Player	Team	No. of selections
G	Terrence Romeo	GlobalPort Batang Pier	3
G	LA Revilla	Mahindra Floodbuster	1
G	Mike Tolomia	Rain or Shine Elasto Painters	1
G/F	Roger Pogoy	TNT KaTropa	1
G/F	Matthew Wright	Phoenix Fuel Masters	1
F	Kevin Ferrer	Barangay Ginebra San Miguel	1
F	Carl Bryan Cruz	Alaska Aces	1
C/F	Alfonzo Gotladera	NLEX Road Warriors	1
C/F	Bradwyn Guinto	NLEX Road Warriors	1
C	June Mar Fajardo	San Miguel Beermen	5
F/C	Norbert Torres	Phoenix Fuel Masters	1
G	Von Pessumal	GlobalPort Batang Pier	1
Head coach: Chot Reyes

==== Game ====
April 26
7:00pm

Boxscore

PBA Mindanao All-Stars 114, Gilas Pilipinas 114
Scoring by quarter: 24–24, 35–31, 27–38, 28–21
Pts: Rosario 28; Rebs: Reavis 14; Asts: three players 4 each	Pts: Wright 22; Rebs: Fajardo 15; Asts: Romeo 8

Xavier University Gymnasium, Cagayan de Oro
Referees: N. Quilinguen, E. Tangkion, B. Oliva, M. Montoya

- All-Star Mindanao Leg MVP: Troy Rosario (PBA Mindanao) and Matthew Wright (Gilas) (co-winners)

== Luzon leg ==
=== Obstacle Challenge ===
Contestants
Pos.	Player	Team	Height	Weight	First round	Final round
G	Maverick Ahanmisi	Rain or Shine Elasto Painters	6–2	190	Advanced to final round	25.8s
G	Alex Cabagnot	San Miguel Beermen	6–1	180	Advanced to final round	26.7s
G	Emman Monfort	NLEX Road Warriors	5–6	132	Advanced to final round	27.1s
G	RJ Jazul	Phoenix Fuel Masters	5–11	170	Advanced to final round	29.4s
G	Simon Enciso	Alaska Aces	5–11	185	Advanced to final round	37.8s
G	Sol Mercado	Barangay Ginebra San Miguel	6–1	200	Advanced to final round	38.4s
G	Roi Sumang	Blackwater Elite	5–8	160	Eliminated	
G	Stanley Pringle	GlobalPort Batang Pier	6–1	185	Eliminated	
G	LA Revilla	Mahindra Floodbuster	5–7	165	Eliminated	
G	Ed Daquioag	Meralco Bolts	6–1	170	Eliminated	
G	Mon Abundo	Star Hotshots	5–8	150	Eliminated	
G	Kris Rosales	TNT KaTropa	6–0	165	Eliminated	

- Gold represent the current champion.

==== First round ====
The winners of each pairing in the first round advanced to the final round.

- Simon Enciso def. Roi Sumang
- Sol Mercado def. Stanley Pringle
- LA Revilla def. Emman Monfort
- RJ Jazul def. Ed Daquioag
- Alex Cabagnot def. Mon Abundo
- Maverick Ahanmisi def. Kris Rosales

=== Three-Point Contest ===
Contestants
Pos.	Player	Team	Height	Weight	First round	Final round
G	Allein Maliksi	Star Hotshots	6–4	180	21	20
G	LA Tenorio	Barangay Ginebra San Miguel	5–8	150	23	18
G	Terrence Romeo	GlobalPort Batang Pier	5–11	178	18	17
G	Simon Enciso	Alaska Aces	5–11	185	17	Did not advance
G	Ronjay Buenafe	Blackwater Elite	6–2	190	16	Did not advance
G	Juami Tiongson	NLEX Road Warriors	5–10	175	16	Did not advance
G	Gary David	Mahindra Floodbuster	6–2	180	15	Did not advance
G	Maverick Ahanmisi	Rain or Shine Elasto Painters	6–2	190	14	Did not advance
G	Marcio Lassiter	San Miguel Beermen	6–2	185	13	Did not advance
F	Jared Dillinger	Meralco Bolts	6–4	220	10	Did not advance
G	Matthew Wright	Phoenix Fuel Masters	6–4	200	8	Did not advance
G	Larry Fonacier	TNT KaTropa	6–2	170	7	Did not advance

- Gold represent current champion.

=== Slam Dunk Contest ===
Contestants
Pos.	Player	Team	Height	Weight	First round	Final round
G	Chris Newsome	Meralco Bolts	6–2	190	95 (45+50)	87 (43+44)
G	James Forrester	GlobalPort Batang Pier	6–2	190	95 (49+46)	86 (50+36)
G	Rey Guevarra	Mahindra Floodbuster	6–3	190	87 (43+44)	
F	Jammer Jamito	Barangay Ginebra San Miguel	6–5	190	76 (39+37)	
F	Marion Magat	Alaska Aces	6–7	180	69 (39+30)	

- Gold represent the current champion.

=== All-Star Game ===
==== Roster ====
PBA Luzon All-Stars
Pos	Player	Team	No. of selections
F	Marc Pingris^{INJ1}	Star Hotshots	13
F/C	Japeth Aguilar	Barangay Ginebra San Miguel	5
F	Calvin Abueva	Alaska Aces	5
G	Paul Lee	Star Hotshots	6
G	Jayson Castro	TNT KaTropa	5
G	Mark Caguioa	Barangay Ginebra San Miguel	11
G	Alex Cabagnot	San Miguel Beermen	5
G	LA Tenorio	Barangay Ginebra San Miguel	7
G/F	Marcio Lassiter	San Miguel Beermen	4
F	Arwind Santos	San Miguel Beermen	9
F	Ranidel de Ocampo	TNT KaTropa	9
G	Stanley Pringle	GlobalPort Batang Pier	3
C	Jay Washington^{ST1}	Rain or Shine Elasto Painters	4
Head coach: Leo Austria (San Miguel Beermen)

Gilas Pilipinas
Pos	Player	Team	No. of selections
G	Mike Tolomia	Rain or Shine Elasto Painters	1
G	Almond Vosotros	Free agent	1
G	Ed Daquioag	Meralco Bolts	1
G/F	Jonathan Grey	Meralco Bolts	1
G/F	Allein Maliksi	Star Hotshots	1
G/F	Matthew Wright	Phoenix Fuel Masters	1
F	Kevin Ferrer	Barangay Ginebra San Miguel	1
F	Carl Bryan Cruz	Alaska Aces	1
F/C	Norbert Torres	Phoenix Fuel Masters	1
C/F	Bradwyn Guinto	NLEX Road Warriors	1
F/C	Raymond Almazan	Rain or Shine Elasto Painters	1
C	Arnold Van Opstal	San Miguel Beermen	1
Head coach: Chot Reyes

- INJ1 Marc Pingris was unable to participate due to a hip injury.
- ^ST1 Jay Washington played in place of Marc Pingris.

==== Game ====
Sports5

April 28
7:00pm

Boxscore

PBA Luzon All-Stars 111, Gilas Pilipinas 122
Scoring by quarter: 34–30, 28–25, 32–30, 17–37
Pts: Aguilar 18; Rebs: Aguilar 10; Asts: Castro, Lassiter 5	Pts: Grey 19; Rebs: Revilla 11; Asts: Wright 7

Quezon Convention Center, Lucena, Quezon
Referees: P. Balao, S. Pineda, R. Yante, R. Gruta

- All-Star Luzon Leg MVP: Matthew Wright (Gilas)

== Visayas leg ==
=== All-Star Game ===
==== Roster ====
PBA Visayas All-Stars
Pos	Player	Team	No. of selections
G/F	James Yap	Rain or Shine Elasto Painters	14
C	Rabeh Al-Hussaini	NLEX Road Warriors	3
G	LA Tenorio	Barangay Ginebra San Miguel	7
F	Joe Devance	Barangay Ginebra San Miguel	6
G/F	Jeff Chan	Rain or Shine Elasto Painters	5
G	Chris Ross	San Miguel Beermen	3
F	Chris Ellis	Barangay Ginebra San Miguel	3
F	Aldrech Ramos^{INJ2}	Star Hotshots	1
G/F	Dondon Hontiveros	Alaska Aces	13
G/F	Ronald Tubid	San Miguel Beermen	8
F	Asi Taulava	NLEX Road Warriors	15
G	Jericho Cruz	Rain or Shine Elasto Painters	3
F/C	J. R. Quiñahan^{ST2}	GlobalPort Batang Pier	3
Head coach: Tim Cone (Barangay Ginebra San Miguel)

Gilas Pilipinas
Pos	Player	Team	No. of selections
G	Jayson Castro	TNT KaTropa	5
G	Terrence Romeo	GlobalPort Batang Pier	3
C	June Mar Fajardo	San Miguel Beermen	5
G/F	Calvin Abueva	Alaska Aces	5
F/C	Japeth Aguilar	Barangay Ginebra San Miguel	5
G/F	Allein Maliksi	Star Hotshots	1
F/C	Troy Rosario	TNT KaTropa	2
F	Raymond Almazan	Rain or Shine Elasto Painters	1
F/C	Jio Jalalon	Star Hotshots	1
G/F	Roger Pogoy	TNT KaTropa	1
G/F	Matthew Wright	Phoenix Fuel Masters	1
Head coach: Chot Reyes

- INJ2 Aldrech Ramos was unable to participate due to a fractured nose.
- ^ST2 J. R. Quiñahan played in place of Aldrech Ramos.
- June Mar Fajardo and Terrence Romeo are initially supposed to play for the PBA Visayas All-Stars, but was moved to the Gilas team in preparation for the SEABA Tournament. LA Tenorio and Rabeh Al- Hussaini replaced them in the PBA Visayas All-Stars lineup.

==== Game ====
Sports5

April 30
7:00pm

Boxscore

PBA Visayas All-Stars 112, Gilas Pilipinas 125
Scoring by quarter: 34–21, 28–38, 30–30, 20–36
Pts: Tenorio 19; Rebs: Ross, Taulava 7 Asts: Ross 5	Pts: Abueva 26; Rebs: Fajardo 13; Asts: Castro 9

Hoops Dome, Lapu-Lapu
Referees: J. Mariano, N. Guevarra, J. Narandan, M. Flordeliza

- All-Star Visayas Leg MVP: Terrence Romeo (Gilas)

== See also ==
- 2016–17 PBA season
- Philippine Basketball Association
- Philippine Basketball Association All-Star Weekend
