= 2024–25 TNT Tropang 5G season =

- Head coach: Chot Reyes
- General manager: Jojo Lastimosa; Yvette Ruiz (assistant)
- Owners: Smart Communications (an MVP Group subsidiary)

Governors' Cup results
- Record: 8–2 (80%)
- Place: 1st in group A
- Playoff finish: Champions (def. Barangay Ginebra, 4–2)

Commissioner's Cup results
- Record: 8–4 (66.7%)
- Place: 2nd
- Playoff finish: Champions (def. Barangay Ginebra, 4–3)

Philippine Cup results
- Record: 6–5 (54.5%)
- Place: 6th
- Playoff finish: Runner-up (lost to San Miguel, 2–4)

TNT Tropang 5G seasons

The 2024–25 TNT Tropang 5G season was the 34th season of the franchise in the Philippine Basketball Association (PBA). The team was known as the TNT Tropang Giga during the Governors' and Commissioner's Cups.

== Key dates ==
- July 14: The PBA season 49 draft was held at the Glorietta Activity Center in Makati.

== Draft picks ==
Round	Pick	Player	Position	Place of birth	College
3	31	Jared Brown	G	USA	Ateneo
4	41	Mark Neil Cruz	C/F	Philippines	CEU

== Roster ==
2024–25 TNT Tropang 5G roster
Players
Coaches

Pos.	#	POB	Name	Height	Weight	DOB (YYYY–MM–DD)	From
F/C	0	(Philippines)	Barkley Eboña	6 ft 6 in (1.98 m)	194 lb (88 kg)	1996–11–29	Far Eastern
G	1	(United States)	Simon Enciso (injured)	5 ft 11 in (1.80 m)	185 lb (84 kg)	1991–02–12	Notre Dame de Namur
G	6	(Philippines)	Rey Nambatac (injured)	5 ft 11 in (1.80 m)		1994–01–27	Letran
C	7	(Philippines)	Poy Erram (injured)	6 ft 8 in (2.03 m)	227 lb (103 kg)	1989–07–07	Ateneo
F	8	(Philippines)	Calvin Oftana	6 ft 5 in (1.96 m)	196 lb (89 kg)	1996–01–03	San Beda
F	9	(United States)	Paul Varilla	6 ft 3 in (1.91 m)		1993–08–10	UE
F	12	(Philippines)	Glenn Khobuntin	6 ft 4 in (1.93 m)	195 lb (88 kg)	1991–09–07	National-U
G	13	(Philippines)	Brian Heruela	5 ft 10 in (1.78 m)	195 lb (88 kg)	1989–04–13	Cebu
F	14	(Philippines)	Mike Nieto	6 ft 2 in (1.88 m)	200 lb (91 kg)	1997–05–31	Ateneo
G	15	(Australia)	Jordan Heading (R)	6 ft 2 in (1.88 m)	189 lb (86 kg)	1996–01–30	Cal Baptist
G/F	16	(Philippines)	Roger Pogoy (C)	6 ft 2 in (1.88 m)	180 lb (82 kg)	1992–06–16	Far Eastern
G	17	(Philippines)	Jayson Castro (injured) (FA)	5 ft 10 in (1.78 m)	185 lb (84 kg)	1986–06–30	Philippine Christian
F/C	21	(United States)	Kelly Williams	6 ft 6 in (1.98 m)	215 lb (98 kg)	1982–02–07	Oakland
G	26	(Philippines)	Almond Vosotros	5 ft 10 in (1.78 m)	170 lb (77 kg)	1990–01–26	De La Salle
F/C	32	(United States)	Henry Galinato	6 ft 6 in (1.98 m)	245 lb (111 kg)	1997–09–09	Philippines
G/F	35	(Philippines)	Kim Aurin	6 ft 1 in (1.85 m)	190 lb (86 kg)	1997–02–05	UPHSD
F/C	45	(United States)	Brandon Ganuelas-Rosser	6 ft 6 in (1.98 m)	220 lb (100 kg)	1994–06–29	UC Riverside
F	50	(United States)	CJ Payawal (R / FA)	6 ft 5 in (1.96 m)	190 lb (86 kg)	1997–06–02	UE
G	53	(Philippines)	Chris Exciminiano (FA)	6 ft 0 in (1.83 m)	185 lb (84 kg)	1988–11–17	Far Eastern
G	99	(Philippines)	Jielo Razon (injured) (R)	5 ft 11 in (1.80 m)		1999–06–09	UPHSD

Head coach

- (Philippines) Chot Reyes

Assistant coach(es)

- (Philippines) Josh Reyes (1st assistant)
- (Philippines) Sandy Arespacochaga
- (Philippines) Ranidel de Ocampo
- (Philippines) Yuri Escueta
- (Philippines) Bong Ravena

Team manager

- (Philippines) Jojo Lastimosa
- (Philippines) Yvette Ruiz (assistant)

Legend

- (C) Team captain
- (CI) Commissioner's Cup Import
- (GI) Governors' Cup Import
- (EI) EASL Import
- (DP) Unsigned draft pick
- (FA) Free agent
- (IN) Inactive
- (S) Suspended
- (R) Rookie
- Injured

Roster

== Governors' Cup ==
=== Eliminations ===
==== Group A Standings ====
Pos	Team	W	L	PCT	GB	Qualification
1	TNT Tropang Giga	8	2	.800	—	Quarterfinals
2	Meralco Bolts	7	3	.700	1	Quarterfinals
3	Converge FiberXers	6	4	.600	2	Quarterfinals
4	Magnolia Chicken Timplados Hotshots	5	5	.500	3	Quarterfinals
5	NorthPort Batang Pier	3	7	.300	5	
6	Terrafirma Dyip	1	9	.100	7	

Source: PBA.ph
Rules for classification: 1) winning percentage; 2) if two teams are tied, head-to-head record, if three or more teams are tied, head-to-head goal average (quotient); 3) overall quotient; 4) coin toss

==== Game log ====
2024 PBA Governors' Cup game log
Total: 8–2
August: 3–1

Game	Date	Opponent	Score	High points	High rebounds	High assists	Location Attendance	Record
1	August 20	NorthPort	W 101–95	Rondae Hollis-Jefferson (32)	Rondae Hollis-Jefferson (10)	Rondae Hollis-Jefferson (5)	Smart Araneta Coliseum	1–0
2	August 22	Meralco	W 93–73	Rondae Hollis-Jefferson (25)	Rondae Hollis-Jefferson (12)	Rondae Hollis-Jefferson (8)	Smart Araneta Coliseum	2–0
3	August 27	Converge	L 95–96	Rondae Hollis-Jefferson (32)	Rondae Hollis-Jefferson (15)	Rondae Hollis-Jefferson (6)	Smart Araneta Coliseum	2–1
4	August 29	Magnolia	W 88–82	Rondae Hollis-Jefferson (32)	Rondae Hollis-Jefferson (19)	Rondae Hollis-Jefferson (7)	Ninoy Aquino Stadium	3–1

September: 5–1

Game	Date	Opponent	Score	High points	High rebounds	High assists	Location Attendance	Record
5	September 5	Terrafirma	W 107–89	Rondae Hollis-Jefferson (26)	Rondae Hollis-Jefferson (11)	Rondae Hollis-Jefferson (7)	Ninoy Aquino Stadium	4–1
6	September 8	Converge	W 98–91	Rondae Hollis-Jefferson (21)	Calvin Oftana (9)	Rondae Hollis-Jefferson (10)	Ninoy Aquino Stadium	5–1
7	September 12	Meralco	W 108–99	Calvin Oftana (25)	Hollis-Jefferson, Oftana (7)	Rondae Hollis-Jefferson (9)	Ninoy Aquino Stadium	6–1
8	September 17	Magnolia	W 84–82	Rondae Hollis-Jefferson (29)	Rondae Hollis-Jefferson (25)	Jayson Castro (7)	Ninoy Aquino Stadium	7–1
9	September 19	Terrafirma	L 72–84	Rondae Hollis-Jefferson (25)	Rondae Hollis-Jefferson (11)	Rey Nambatac (4)	Ninoy Aquino Stadium	7–2
10	September 22	NorthPort	W 99–79	Poy Erram (17)	Poy Erram (13)	Poy Erram (4)	Smart Araneta Coliseum	8–2

=== Playoffs ===
==== Bracket ====
Quarterfinals (Best-of-5)
A1	TNT	3
B4	NLEX	1
B1	Rain or Shine	3
A4	Magnolia	2
B2	San Miguel	3
A3	Converge	2
A2	Meralco	0
B3	Barangay Ginebra	3

Semifinals (Best-of-7)
A1	TNT	4
B1	Rain or Shine	1
B2	San Miguel	2
B3	Barangay Ginebra	4

Finals (Best-of-7)
A1	TNT	4
B3	Barangay Ginebra	2

==== Game log ====
2024 PBA Governors' Cup playoffs game log
Total: 11–4
Quarterfinals: 3–1

Game	Date	Opponent	Score	High points	High rebounds	High assists	Location Attendance	Series
1	September 25	NLEX	W 107–102	Rondae Hollis-Jefferson (45)	Rondae Hollis-Jefferson (10)	Rondae Hollis-Jefferson (7)	Ninoy Aquino Stadium	1–0
2	September 27	NLEX	L 90–93	Rondae Hollis-Jefferson (22)	Rondae Hollis-Jefferson (22)	Rondae Hollis-Jefferson (5)	Santa Rosa Sports Complex	1–1
3	September 29	NLEX	W 109–91	Rondae Hollis-Jefferson (27)	Rondae Hollis-Jefferson (12)	Rondae Hollis-Jefferson (8)	Ynares Center	2–1
4	October 1	NLEX	W 125–96	Rondae Hollis-Jefferson (35)	Rondae Hollis-Jefferson (11)	Jayson Castro (4)	Ninoy Aquino Stadium	3–1

Semifinals: 4–1

Game	Date	Opponent	Score	High points	High rebounds	High assists	Location Attendance	Series
1	October 9	Rain or Shine	W 90–81	Rondae Hollis-Jefferson (26)	Rondae Hollis-Jefferson (13)	Rondae Hollis-Jefferson (9)	PhilSports Arena	1–0
2	October 11	Rain or Shine	W 108–91	Rondae Hollis-Jefferson (23)	Calvin Oftana (14)	Roger Pogoy (6)	Smart Araneta Coliseum	2–0
3	October 13	Rain or Shine	L 109–110	Poy Erram (27)	Rondae Hollis-Jefferson (10)	Rondae Hollis-Jefferson (11)	Dasmariñas Arena	2–1
4	October 16	Rain or Shine	W 81–79	Rondae Hollis-Jefferson (23)	Rondae Hollis-Jefferson (19)	Rondae Hollis-Jefferson (5)	Smart Araneta Coliseum	3–1
5	October 18	Rain or Shine	W 113–95	Rondae Hollis-Jefferson (36)	Rondae Hollis-Jefferson (10)	Rondae Hollis-Jefferson (9)	Ynares Center; 10,039	4–1

Finals: 4–2

Game	Date	Opponent	Score	High points	High rebounds	High assists	Location Attendance	Series
1	October 27	Barangay Ginebra	W 104–88	Rondae Hollis-Jefferson (19)	Hollis-Jefferson, Nambatac (10)	Rey Nambatac (7)	Ynares Center; 11,021	1–0
2	October 30	Barangay Ginebra	W 96–84	Rondae Hollis-Jefferson (37)	Calvin Oftana (14)	Castro, Hollis-Jefferson (7)	Smart Araneta Coliseum	2–0
3	November 1	Barangay Ginebra	L 73–85	Rondae Hollis-Jefferson (24)	Rondae Hollis-Jefferson (14)	Rondae Hollis-Jefferson (7)	Smart Araneta Coliseum; 11,320	2–1
4	November 3	Barangay Ginebra	L 92–106	Rondae Hollis-Jefferson (28)	Rondae Hollis-Jefferson (9)	Jayson Castro (6)	Smart Araneta Coliseum; 16,783	2–2
5	November 6	Barangay Ginebra	W 99–72	Hollis-Jefferson, Pogoy (16)	Rondae Hollis-Jefferson (10)	Jayson Castro (7)	Smart Araneta Coliseum; 12,727	3–2
6	November 8	Barangay Ginebra	W 95–85	Rondae Hollis-Jefferson (31)	Rondae Hollis-Jefferson (16)	Rondae Hollis-Jefferson (8)	Smart Araneta Coliseum; 14,668	4–2

== Commissioner's Cup ==
=== Eliminations ===
==== Standings ====
Pos	Team	W	L	PCT	GB	Qualification
1	NorthPort Batang Pier	9	3	.750	—	Twice-to-beat in the quarterfinals
2	TNT Tropang Giga	8	4	.667 (Note: Head-to-head quotient: TNT 1.04, Converge 1.03, Barangay Ginebra 0.94)	1	Twice-to-beat in the quarterfinals
3	Converge FiberXers	8	4	.667	1	Best-of-three quarterfinals
4	Barangay Ginebra San Miguel	8	4	.667	1	Best-of-three quarterfinals
5	Meralco Bolts	7	5	.583 (Note: Head-to-head quotient: Meralco 1.08, Rain or Shine 1.04, Eastern 0.88)	2	Best-of-three quarterfinals
6	Rain or Shine Elasto Painters	7	5	.583	2	Best-of-three quarterfinals
7	Eastern (G)	7	5	.583	2	Twice-to-win in the quarterfinals
8	Magnolia Chicken Timplados Hotshots	6	6	.500 (Note: Eighth seed playoff: Magnolia 112–81 NLEX)	3	Twice-to-win in the quarterfinals
9	NLEX Road Warriors	6	6	.500	3	
10	San Miguel Beermen	5	7	.417	4	
11	Blackwater Bossing	3	9	.250 (Note: Head-to-head record: Blackwater 1–0 Phoenix)	6	
12	Phoenix Fuel Masters	3	9	.250	6	
13	Terrafirma Dyip	1	11	.083	8	

Source: PBA.ph
Rules for classification: 1) winning percentage; 2) if two teams are tied, head-to-head record; if three or more teams are tied, head-to-head goal average (quotient); if tied for 8th, one-game playoff; 3) overall quotient; 4) coin toss
(G) Guests

==== Game log ====
2024–25 PBA Commissioner's Cup game log
Total: 8–4
December: 2–2

Game	Date	Opponent	Score	High points	High rebounds	High assists	Location Attendance	Record
1	December 6, 2024	Eastern	L 84–105	Rondae Hollis-Jefferson (33)	Henry Galinato (12)	Rey Nambatac (4)	Ninoy Aquino Stadium	0–1
2	December 8, 2024	NorthPort	L 95–100	Calvin Oftana (20)	Rondae Hollis-Jefferson (14)	Rey Nambatac (8)	Ynares Center	0–2
3	December 11, 2024	Magnolia	W 103–100	Calvin Oftana (42)	Rondae Hollis-Jefferson (13)	Hollis-Jefferson, Pogoy (5)	Ninoy Aquino Stadium	1–2
4	December 19, 2024	Blackwater	W 109–93	Rondae Hollis-Jefferson (22)	Rondae Hollis-Jefferson (9)	Rondae Hollis-Jefferson (6)	Ninoy Aquino Stadium	2–2

January: 6–2

Game	Date	Opponent	Score	High points	High rebounds	High assists	Location Attendance	Record
5	January 7, 2025	Meralco	W 101–99	Hollis-Jefferson, Oftana (24)	Rondae Hollis-Jefferson (13)	Jayson Castro (6)	PhilSports Arena	3–2
6	January 11, 2025	Converge	W 98–96	Rondae Hollis-Jefferson (31)	Rondae Hollis-Jefferson (11)	Jayson Castro (5)	Ninoy Aquino Stadium	4–2
7	January 15, 2025	NLEX	W 94–87	Rondae Hollis-Jefferson (23)	Rondae Hollis-Jefferson (14)	Rondae Hollis-Jefferson (7)	Ninoy Aquino Stadium	5–2
8	January 17, 2025	Barangay Ginebra	W 94–87	Calvin Oftana (32)	Rondae Hollis-Jefferson (13)	Castro, Hollis-Jefferson (6)	PhilSports Arena	6–2
9	January 22, 2025	Terrafirma	L 108–117	Rondae Hollis-Jefferson (41)	Rondae Hollis-Jefferson (10)	Rey Nambatac (4)	Ynares Center	6–3
10	January 24, 2025	Phoenix	W 106–70	Rondae Hollis-Jefferson (15)	Galinato, Hollis-Jefferson (10)	Rondae Hollis-Jefferson (5)	Ynares Center	7–3
11	January 26, 2025	San Miguel	W 115–97	Rondae Hollis-Jefferson (35)	Rondae Hollis-Jefferson (21)	Rondae Hollis-Jefferson (10)	Ynares Center	8–3
12	January 31, 2025	Rain or Shine	L 96–106	Rondae Hollis-Jefferson (23)	Rondae Hollis-Jefferson (10)	Rondae Hollis-Jefferson (8)	PhilSports Arena	8–4

=== Playoffs ===
==== Bracket ====
Quarterfinals
(#1 twice-to-beat)
1	NorthPort	113
8	Magnolia	110
(Best-of-3)
4	Barangay Ginebra	2
5	Meralco	1
(#2 twice-to-beat)
2	TNT	109
7	Eastern	93
(Best-of-3)
3	Converge	1
6	Rain or Shine	2

Semifinals (Best-of-7)
1	NorthPort	1
4	Barangay Ginebra	4
2	TNT	4
6	Rain or Shine	1

Finals (Best-of-7)
4	Barangay Ginebra	3
2	TNT	4

==== Game log ====
2024–25 PBA Commissioner's Cup playoffs game log
Total: 9–4
Quarterfinals: 1–0

Game	Date	Opponent	Score	High points	High rebounds	High assists	Location Attendance	Series
1	February 6, 2025	Eastern	W 109–93	Rondae Hollis-Jefferson (31)	Rondae Hollis-Jefferson (15)	Rondae Hollis-Jefferson (4)	Ninoy Aquino Stadium	1–0

Semifinals: 4–1

Game	Date	Opponent	Score	High points	High rebounds	High assists	Location Attendance	Series
1	February 26, 2025	Rain or Shine	W 88–84	Jayson Castro (24)	Rondae Hollis-Jefferson (13)	Rondae Hollis-Jefferson (5)	Smart Araneta Coliseum	1–0
2	February 28, 2025	Rain or Shine	W 93–91	Rondae Hollis-Jefferson (28)	Rondae Hollis-Jefferson (10)	Jayson Castro (5)	PhilSports Arena	2–0
3	March 2, 2025	Rain or Shine	L 98–103	Rondae Hollis-Jefferson (34)	Rondae Hollis-Jefferson (19)	Rey Nambatac (3)	Smart Araneta Coliseum	2–1
4	March 5, 2025	Rain or Shine	W 93–85	Calvin Oftana (26)	Rondae Hollis-Jefferson (11)	Rondae Hollis-Jefferson (5)	Smart Araneta Coliseum	3–1
5	March 7, 2025	Rain or Shine	W 97–92	Rondae Hollis-Jefferson (42)	Calvin Oftana (12)	Rey Nambatac (8)	Smart Araneta Coliseum	4–1

Finals: 4–3

Game	Date	Opponent	Score	High points	High rebounds	High assists	Location Attendance	Series
1	March 14	Barangay Ginebra	W 95–89	Rondae Hollis-Jefferson (34)	Rondae Hollis-Jefferson (13)	Rondae Hollis-Jefferson (8)	SM Mall of Asia Arena; 11,802	1–0
2	March 16	Barangay Ginebra	L 70–71	Rondae Hollis-Jefferson (25)	Rondae Hollis-Jefferson (15)	Rey Nambatac (5)	SM Mall of Asia Arena; 12,925	1–1
3	March 19	Barangay Ginebra	W 87–85	Rey Nambatac (24)	Rondae Hollis-Jefferson (11)	Rondae Hollis-Jefferson (8)	PhilSports Arena	2–1
4	March 21	Barangay Ginebra	L 78–95	Calvin Oftana (17)	Rondae Hollis-Jefferson (12)	Rondae Hollis-Jefferson (5)	Ynares Center	2–2
5	March 23	Barangay Ginebra	L 66–73	Hollis-Jefferson, Nambatac (19)	Rondae Hollis-Jefferson (12)	Calvin Oftana (8)	Smart Araneta Coliseum; 12,447	2–3
6	March 26	Barangay Ginebra	W 87–83	Rondae Hollis-Jefferson (29)	Rondae Hollis-Jefferson (13)	Rondae Hollis-Jefferson (6)	Smart Araneta Coliseum; 17,654	3–3
7	March 28	Barangay Ginebra	W 87–83 (OT)	Rondae Hollis-Jefferson (25)	Rondae Hollis-Jefferson (12)	Rey Nambatac (4)	Smart Araneta Coliseum; 21,274	4–3

== Philippine Cup ==
=== Eliminations ===
==== Standings ====
Pos	Team	W	L	PCT	GB	Qualification
1	San Miguel Beermen	8	3	.727 (Note: Head-to-head quotient: San Miguel 1.06, NLEX 1.01, Magnolia 0.97, Barangay Ginebra 0.96)	—	Twice-to-beat in the quarterfinals
2	NLEX Road Warriors	8	3	.727	—	Twice-to-beat in the quarterfinals
3	Magnolia Chicken Timplados Hotshots	8	3	.727	—	Twice-to-beat in the quarterfinals
4	Barangay Ginebra San Miguel	8	3	.727	—	Twice-to-beat in the quarterfinals
5	Converge FiberXers	7	4	.636	1	Twice-to-win in the quarterfinals
6	TNT Tropang 5G	6	5	.545 (Note: Head-to-head quotient: TNT 1.13, Rain or Shine 1.02, Meralco 0.87)	2	Twice-to-win in the quarterfinals
7	Rain or Shine Elasto Painters	6	5	.545	2	Twice-to-win in the quarterfinals
8	Meralco Bolts	6	5	.545	2	Twice-to-win in the quarterfinals
9	Phoenix Fuel Masters	4	7	.364	4	
10	Blackwater Bossing	2	9	.182 (Note: Head-to-head record: Blackwater 1–0 NorthPort)	6	
11	NorthPort Batang Pier	2	9	.182	6	
12	Terrafirma Dyip	1	10	.091	7	

Source: PBA.ph
Rules for classification: 1) winning percentage; 2) if two teams are tied, head-to-head record; if three or more teams are tied, head-to-head goal average (quotient); if tied for 8th, one-game playoff; 3) overall quotient; 4) coin toss

==== Game log ====
2025 PBA Philippine Cup game log
Total: 6–5
April: 0–2

Game	Date	Opponent	Score	High points	High rebounds	High assists	Location Attendance	Record
1	April 23	NLEX	L 74–91	Roger Pogoy (12)	Calvin Oftana (7)	Kelly Williams (3)	Smart Araneta Coliseum	0–1
2	April 27	Converge	L 94–100	Calvin Oftana (33)	Poy Erram (11)	Nambatac, Oftana (4)	Ynares Center	0–2

May: 5–1

Game	Date	Opponent	Score	High points	High rebounds	High assists	Location Attendance	Record
3	May 2	Phoenix	L 81–95	Calvin Oftana (20)	Calvin Oftana (9)	Calvin Oftana (6)	Ynares Center II	0–3
4	May 4	San Miguel	W 89–84	Calvin Oftana (23)	Calvin Oftana (21)	Calvin Oftana (6)	Ynares Center	1–3
5	May 9	Terrafirma	W 110–74	Calvin Oftana (22)	Khobuntin, Williams (7)	Simon Enciso (7)	PhilSports Arena	2–3
6	May 11	Meralco	W 101–84	Roger Pogoy (34)	Enciso, Williams (7)	Rey Nambatac (5)	Ninoy Aquino Stadium	3–3
7	May 21	Rain or Shine	W 111–103	Roger Pogoy (35)	Oftana, Williams (8)	Simon Enciso (6)	Ynares Center	4–3
8	May 30	NorthPort	W 94–70	Calvin Oftana (15)	Kelly Williams (12)	Roger Pogoy (6)	Smart Araneta Coliseum	5–3

June: 1–2

Game	Date	Opponent	Score	High points	High rebounds	High assists	Location Attendance	Record
9	June 6	Blackwater	W 108–82	Simon Enciso (19)	Kelly Williams (7)	Aurin, Heruela, Oftana, Pogoy (3)	Ninoy Aquino Stadium	6–3
10	June 8	Barangay Ginebra	L 78–97	Calvin Oftana (18)	Poy Erram (6)	Enciso, Heading (3)	Ninoy Aquino Stadium	6–4
11	June 13	Magnolia	L 83–88	Roger Pogoy (18)	Erram, Khobuntin (9)	Enciso, Khobuntin, Oftana (4)	Ninoy Aquino Stadium	6–5

=== Playoffs ===
==== Bracket ====
Quarterfinals (Top 4 twice-to-beat)
1	San Miguel	108
8	Meralco	97
4	Barangay Ginebra	88
5	Converge	80
2	NLEX	89	92
7	Rain or Shine	92	103
3	Magnolia	88	79
6	TNT	89	80

Semifinals (Best-of-7)
1	San Miguel	4
4	Barangay Ginebra	3
7	Rain or Shine	2
6	TNT	4

Finals (Best-of-7)
1	San Miguel	4
6	TNT	2

==== Game log ====
2025 PBA Philippine Cup playoffs game log
Total: 8–6
Quarterfinals: 2–0

Game	Date	Opponent	Score	High points	High rebounds	High assists	Location Attendance	Series
1	June 18	Magnolia	W 89–88	Roger Pogoy (30)	Calvin Oftana (16)	Calvin Oftana (5)	PhilSports Arena	1–0
2	June 21	Magnolia	W 80–79	Oftana, Pogoy (18)	Kelly Williams (10)	Roger Pogoy (5)	Ninoy Aquino Stadium	2–0

Semifinals: 4–2

Game	Date	Opponent	Score	High points	High rebounds	High assists	Location Attendance	Series
1	June 25	Rain or Shine	W 98–91	Roger Pogoy (28)	Erram, Ganuelas-Rosser, Oftana (10)	Simon Enciso (5)	SM Mall of Asia Arena	1–0
2	June 27	Rain or Shine	W 113–105 (OT)	Calvin Oftana (39)	Kelly Williams (12)	Jordan Heading (11)	Ninoy Aquino Stadium	2–0
3	June 29	Rain or Shine	L 86–107	Calvin Oftana (16)	Henry Galinato (10)	Henry Galinato (4)	Smart Araneta Coliseum	2–1
4	July 2	Rain or Shine	W 108–92	Jordan Heading (23)	Brandon Ganuelas-Rosser (11)	Jordan Heading (6)	SM Mall of Asia Arena	3–1
5	July 4	Rain or Shine	L 97–113	Calvin Oftana (23)	Galinato, Ganuelas-Rosser (6)	Jordan Heading (3)	Smart Araneta Coliseum	3–2
6	July 6	Rain or Shine	W 97–89	Jordan Heading (29)	Glenn Khobuntin (12)	Heading, Oftana (4)	Smart Araneta Coliseum	4–2

Finals: 2–4

Game	Date	Opponent	Score	High points	High rebounds	High assists	Location Attendance	Series
1	July 13	San Miguel	W 99–96	Roger Pogoy (23)	Calvin Oftana (9)	Jordan Heading (6)	Smart Araneta Coliseum	1–0
2	July 16	San Miguel	L 92–98	Calvin Oftana (23)	Kelly Williams (8)	Erram, Williams (3)	Smart Araneta Coliseum	1–1
3	July 18	San Miguel	L 88–108	Roger Pogoy (16)	Calvin Oftana (9)	Enciso, Heading (3)	Smart Araneta Coliseum	1–2
4	July 20	San Miguel	L 91–105	Jordan Heading (23)	Glenn Khobuntin (10)	Heading, Williams (5)	SM Mall of Asia Arena	1–3
5	July 23	San Miguel	W 86–78	Brandon Ganuelas-Rosser (18)	Oftana, Williams (7)	Heading, Oftana (5)	Smart Araneta Coliseum	2–3
6	July 25	San Miguel	L 96–107	Calvin Oftana (19)	Oftana, Williams (4)	Ganuelas-Rosser, Pogoy, Williams (4)	PhilSports Arena	2–4

== Transactions ==
=== Free agency ===
==== Signings ====
Player	Date signed	Contract amount	Contract length	Former team	Ref.
Chris Exciminiano	July 18, 2024	Not disclosed	Not disclosed	TNT Triple Giga (PBA 3x3)	
Almond Vosotros	July 18, 2024	Not disclosed	Not disclosed	TNT Triple Giga (PBA 3x3)	
Jielo Razon	December 4, 2024	Not disclosed	1 year	Parañaque Patriots (MPBL)	
Kim Aurin	January 29, 2025	Not disclosed	2 years	Re-signed	
Jayson Castro	January 29, 2025	Not disclosed	2 years	Re-signed	
Poy Erram	January 29, 2025	Not disclosed	1 year	Re-signed	
Rey Nambatac	January 29, 2025	Not disclosed	2 years	Re-signed	
Simon Enciso	April 8, 2025	Not disclosed	2 years	San Miguel Beermen	
Kelly Williams	May 13, 2025	Not disclosed	1 year	Re-signed	
Almond Vosotros	May 30, 2025	Not disclosed	Not disclosed	Re-signed	
Mike Nieto	June 3, 2025	Not disclosed	Not disclosed	Converge FiberXers	

==== Subtractions ====
Player	Number	Position	Reason	New team	Ref.
Almond Vosotros	26	Point guard / Shooting guard	End of contract; did not agree to term extension	TNT Tropang 5G	

=== Trades ===
==== Pre-season ====
July
July 2, 2024	To TNT Rey Nambatac	To Blackwater Kib Montalbo; Jewel Ponferada; 2028 TNT second-round pick

==== Philippine Cup ====
June
June 2, 2025	To TNT Jordan Heading	To Converge Mikey Williams

=== Recruited imports ===
Tournament	Name	Debuted	Last game	Record	Ref.
Governors' Cup	Rondae Hollis-Jefferson	August 20, 2024 (vs. NorthPort)	November 8, 2024 (vs. Barangay Ginebra)	18–6	
Commissioner's Cup	Rondae Hollis-Jefferson	December 6, 2024 (vs. Eastern)	March 28, 2025 (vs. Barangay Ginebra)	17–8	

== Awards ==
Recipient	Award	Date awarded	Reference
Rondae Hollis-Jefferson	2024 PBA Governors' Cup Best Import of the Conference	November 3, 2024	
Rondae Hollis-Jefferson	2024–25 PBA Commissioner's Cup Best Import of the Conference	March 21, 2025	
Jayson Castro	2024 PBA Governors' Cup Finals Most Valuable Player	November 8, 2024	
Rey Nambatac	2024–25 PBA Commissioner's Cup Finals Most Valuable Player	March 28, 2025	
Calvin Oftana	2024–25 PBA Order of Merit	October 13, 2025	
Brandon Ganuelas-Rosser	2024–25 PBA Comeback Player of the Year	October 13, 2025	
Chot Reyes	2024–25 PBA Coach of the Year	October 13, 2025	
Manny Pangilinan	2024–25 PBA Executive of the Year	October 13, 2025	
Recipient	Honors	Date awarded	Reference
Calvin Oftana	2024–25 PBA Mythical First Team	October 5, 2025	
Roger Pogoy	2024–25 PBA Mythical Second Team	October 5, 2025	
Glenn Khobuntin	2024–25 PBA All-Defensive Team	October 5, 2025	
Jordan Heading	2024–25 PBA All-Rookie Team	October 13, 2025	
