= 2024 PBA Governors' Cup finals =

2024 edition of the PBA Governors' Cup finals

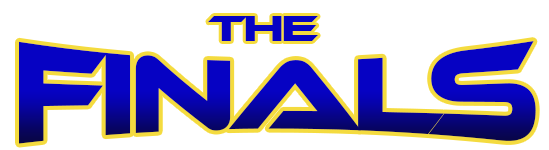
Team	Coach	Wins
(A1) TNT Tropang Giga	Chot Reyes	4
(B3) Barangay Ginebra San Miguel	Tim Cone	2
- Dates: October 27 – November 8, 2024
- MVP: Jayson Castro (TNT Tropang Giga)
- Television: Local: RPTV; PBA Rush (HD); International: Pilipinas Live; Online: Pilipinas Live
- Announcers: see Broadcast notes

Referees
- Game 1: Peter Balao, Jerry Narandan, Albert Nubla, Janine Nicandro
- Game 2: Rommel Gruta, Mike Flordeliza, Jeffrey Tantay, Karlo Vergara
- Game 3: Nol Quilinguen, Bing Oliva, Mardy Montoya, Bryan Peclaro
- Game 4: Jerry Narandan, Albert Nubla, Jeffrey Tantay, Rommel Gruta
- Game 5: Nol Quilinguen, Rommel Gruta, Mardy Montoya, Janine Nicandro
- Game 6: Peter Balao, Rommel Gruta, Jeffrey Tantay, Karlo Vergara

PBA Governors' Cup finals chronology
- < 2023

PBA finals chronology
- < 2024 Philippine 2024–25 Commissioner's >

The 2024 Philippine Basketball Association (PBA) Governors' Cup finals was the best-of-7 championship series for the 2024 PBA Governors' Cup. It marked the end of the conference's playoffs.

The TNT Tropang Giga and the Barangay Ginebra San Miguel competed for the 22nd Governors' Cup championship and the 136th overall championship contested by the league. It was the rematch of the previous Governors' Cup finals.

TNT defeated Barangay Ginebra in six games to win their second straight Governors' Cup. Jayson Castro was named the finals' MVP.

== Background ==
=== Road to the finals ===
TNT Tropang Giga		Barangay Ginebra San Miguel
Finished 8–2 (.800) 1st place in Group A	Elimination round	Finished 6–4 (.600) 2nd place in Group B with San Miguel
—N/a	Tiebreaker	Head-to-head record: San Miguel 1–1 Barangay Ginebra (San Miguel 1.23, Barangay Ginebra 0.82)
Def. NLEX, 3–1	Quarterfinals	Def. Meralco, 3–0
Def. Rain or Shine, 4–1	Semifinals	Def. San Miguel, 4–2

== Series summary ==
Game	Date	Venue	Winner	Result
Game 1	October 27	Smart Araneta Coliseum	TNT	104–88
Game 2	October 30	Smart Araneta Coliseum	TNT	96–84
Game 3	November 1	Smart Araneta Coliseum	Barangay Ginebra	85–73
Game 4	November 3	Smart Araneta Coliseum	Barangay Ginebra	106–92
Game 5	November 6	Smart Araneta Coliseum	TNT	99–72
Game 6	November 8	Smart Araneta Coliseum	TNT	95–85

== Game summaries ==
=== Game 1 ===
RPTV

October 27
7:30 pm

Box score

TNT Tropang Giga 104, Barangay Ginebra San Miguel 88
Scoring by quarter: 27–15, 16–22, 29–25, 32–26
Pts: Hollis-Jefferson 19; Rebs: Hollis-Jefferson, Nambatac 10; Asts: Nambatac 7	Pts: Brownlee 23; Rebs: Holt 8 Asts: three players 6
TNT leads series, 1–0

Araneta Coliseum, Quezon City
Attendance: 11,021
Referees: Peter Balao, Jerry Narandan, Albert Nubla, Janine Nicandro

Proceeds of this game will be donated to the victims of Severe Tropical Storm Trami (Kristine).

=== Game 2 ===
RPTV

October 30
7:30 pm

Box score

TNT Tropang Giga 96, Barangay Ginebra San Miguel 84
Scoring by quarter: 19–23, 30–18, 23–30, 24–13
Pts: Hollis-Jefferson 37; Rebs: Oftana 14; Asts: Castro, Hollis-Jefferson 7	Pts: Brownlee 19; Rebs: Brownlee, Thompson 9 Asts: Abarrientos 5
TNT leads series, 2–0

Araneta Coliseum, Quezon City
Referees: Rommel Gruta, Mike Flordeliza, Jeffrey Tantay, Karlo Vergara

=== Game 3 ===
RPTV

November 1
7:30 pm

Box score

TNT Tropang Giga 73, Barangay Ginebra San Miguel 85
Scoring by quarter: 19–20, 20–22, 20–20, 14–23
Pts: Hollis-Jefferson 24; Rebs: Hollis-Jefferson 14; Asts: Hollis-Jefferson 7	Pts: Brownlee 18; Rebs: Brownlee 13; Asts: three players 4
TNT leads series, 2–1

Araneta Coliseum, Quezon City
Attendance: 11,320
Referees: Nol Quilinguen, Bing Oliva, Mardy Montoya, Bryan Peclaro

=== Game 4 ===
RPTV

November 3
7:35 pm

Box score

TNT Tropang Giga 92, Barangay Ginebra San Miguel 106
Scoring by quarter: 25–30, 17–24, 35–31, 15–21
Pts: Hollis-Jefferson 28; Rebs: Hollis-Jefferson 9 Asts: Castro 6	Pts: Brownlee 34; Rebs: Ahanmisi 8 Asts: Brownlee, Thompson 4
Series tied, 2–2

Araneta Coliseum, Quezon City
Attendance: 16,783
Referees: Jerry Narandan, Albert Nubla, Jeffrey Tantay, Rommel Gruta

Prior to the game, San Miguel's June Mar Fajardo was awarded his eleventh Best Player of the Conference award, extending his record for most career BPC awards, while TNT's Rondae Hollis-Jefferson was awarded his second Best Import of the Conference award.

=== Game 5 ===
RPTV

November 6
7:30 pm

Box score

TNT Tropang Giga 99, Barangay Ginebra San Miguel 72
Scoring by quarter: 26–20, 30–13, 23–15, 20–24
Pts: Hollis-Jefferson, Pogoy 16; Rebs: Hollis-Jefferson 10; Asts: Castro 7	Pts: Tenorio, Thompson 13; Rebs: Brownlee 10; Asts: Brownlee 3
TNT leads series, 3–2

Araneta Coliseum, Quezon City
Attendance: 12,727
Referees: Nol Quilinguen, Rommel Gruta, Mardy Montoya, Janine Nicandro

=== Game 6 ===
RPTV

November 8
7:30 pm

Box score

TNT Tropang Giga 95, Barangay Ginebra San Miguel 85
Scoring by quarter: 21–16, 21–27, 24–31, 29–11
Pts: Hollis-Jefferson 31; Rebs: Hollis-Jefferson 16; Asts: Hollis-Jefferson 8	Pts: Abarrientos 31; Rebs: Thompson 10; Asts: Thompson 5
TNT wins series, 4–2

Araneta Coliseum, Quezon City
Attendance: 14,668
Referees: Peter Balao, Rommel Gruta, Jeffrey Tantay, Karlo Vergara

== Rosters ==
TNT Tropang Giga roster
Players
Coaches

Pos.	#	POB	Name	Height	Weight	DOB (YYYY–MM–DD)	From
F/C	0	(Philippines)	Barkley Eboña	6 ft 6 in (1.98 m)	194 lb (88 kg)	1996–11–29	Far Eastern
G	6	(Philippines)	Rey Nambatac	5 ft 11 in (1.80 m)		1994–01–27	Letran
C	7	(Philippines)	Poy Erram	6 ft 8 in (2.03 m)	227 lb (103 kg)	1989–07–07	Ateneo
F	8	(Philippines)	Calvin Oftana	6 ft 5 in (1.96 m)	196 lb (89 kg)	1996–01–03	San Beda
F	9	(United States)	Paul Varilla	6 ft 3 in (1.91 m)		1993–08–10	UE
G	10	(Philippines)	Ryan Reyes	6 ft 2 in (1.88 m)	190 lb (86 kg)	1983–08–10	Cal State Fullerton
F	12	(Philippines)	Glenn Khobuntin	6 ft 4 in (1.93 m)	195 lb (88 kg)	1991–09–07	National-U
G	13	(Philippines)	Brian Heruela	5 ft 10 in (1.78 m)	195 lb (88 kg)	1989–04–13	Cebu
G/F	16	(Philippines)	Roger Pogoy (C)	6 ft 2 in (1.88 m)	180 lb (82 kg)	1992–06–16	Far Eastern
G	17	(Philippines)	Jayson Castro	5 ft 10 in (1.78 m)	185 lb (84 kg)	1986–06–30	Philippine Christian
F/C	21	(United States)	Kelly Williams	6 ft 6 in (1.98 m)	215 lb (98 kg)	1982–02–07	Oakland
F/C	24	(United States)	Rondae Hollis-Jefferson (GI)	6 ft 6 in (1.98 m)	217 lb (98 kg)	1995–01–03	Arizona
G	26	(Philippines)	Almond Vosotros (FA)	5 ft 10 in (1.78 m)	165 lb (75 kg)	1990–01–26	De La Salle
F/C	32	(United States)	Henry Galinato	6 ft 6 in (1.98 m)	245 lb (111 kg)	1997-01-1	Philippines
G	35	(Philippines)	Kim Aurin	6 ft 1 in (1.85 m)	190 lb (86 kg)	1997-02-05	UPHSD
F/C	45	(United States)	Brandon Ganuelas-Rosser (injured)	6 ft 6 in (1.98 m)	220 lb (100 kg)	1994–06–29	UC Riverside
F	50	(United States)	CJ Payawal (R)	6 ft 5 in (1.96 m)	190 lb (86 kg)	1997–01–01	UE
G	53	(Philippines)	Chris Exciminiano	6 ft 0 in (1.83 m)	185 lb (84 kg)	1988–11–17	Far Eastern

Head coach

- (Philippines) Chot Reyes

Assistant coach(es)

- (Philippines) Josh Reyes (1st assistant)
- (Philippines) Sandy Arespacochaga
- (Philippines) Ranidel de Ocampo
- (Philippines) Yuri Escueta
- (Philippines) Bong Ravena

Team manager

- (Philippines) Jojo Lastimosa
- (Philippines) Yvette Ruiz (assistant)

Legend

- (C) Team captain
- (CI) Commissioner's Cup Import
- (GI) Governors' Cup Import
- (EI) EASL Import
- (DP) Unsigned draft pick
- (FA) Free agent
- (IN) Inactive
- (S) Suspended
- (R) Rookie
- Injured

Roster

Barangay Ginebra San Miguel roster
Players
Coaches

Pos.	#	POB	Name	Height	Weight	DOB (YYYY–MM–DD)	From
G	00	(United States)	Maverick Ahanmisi	6 ft 2 in (1.88 m)	190 lb (86 kg)	1991–07–17	Minnesota
G/F	2	(United States)	Jeremiah Gray (injured)	6 ft 5 in (1.96 m)	205 lb (93 kg)	1996–08–16	Dominican (CA)
F	3	(United States)	Jamie Malonzo (injured)	6 ft 6 in (1.98 m)	210 lb (95 kg)	1996–07–31	De La Salle
G	4	(Philippines)	RJ Abarrientos (R)	5 ft 11 in (1.80 m)		1999–09–14	Far Eastern
G	5	(Philippines)	LA Tenorio (C)	5 ft 9 in (1.75 m)	151 lb (68 kg)	1984–07–09	Ateneo
G	6	(United States)	Paul Garcia (R / FA)	5 ft 11 in (1.80 m)	170 lb (77 kg)		Ateneo
G	9	(Philippines)	Scottie Thompson	6 ft 1 in (1.85 m)	180 lb (82 kg)	1993–07–12	UPHSD
G	10	(Philippines)	John Pinto	5 ft 11 in (1.80 m)	170 lb (77 kg)	1990–10–15	Arellano
F/C	11	(Philippines)	Isaac Go (injured)	6 ft 7 in (2.01 m)	230 lb (104 kg)	1996–06–07	Ateneo
G/F	14	(United States)	Stephen Holt	6 ft 4 in (1.93 m)	195 lb (88 kg)	1991–12–06	Saint Mary's
F	18	(Philippines)	Ralph Cu	6 ft 4 in (1.93 m)	210 lb (95 kg)	1997–03–08	De La Salle
G/F	19	(Philippines)	Von Pessumal	6 ft 2 in (1.88 m)	185 lb (84 kg)	1993–02–12	Ateneo
F	22	(United States)	Jared Dillinger (IN)	6 ft 4 in (1.93 m)	220 lb (100 kg)	1984–01–06	Hawaiʻi
F/C	23	(Philippines)	Raymond Aguilar	6 ft 4 in (1.93 m)	200 lb (91 kg)	1985–07–27	National-U
G/F	24	(Philippines)	Jayson David (FA)	6 ft 2 in (1.88 m)	191 lb (87 kg)	1996–11–08	Lyceum
C	25	(Philippines)	Japeth Aguilar	6 ft 9 in (2.06 m)	235 lb (107 kg)	1987–01–25	Western Kentucky
F	31	(Philippines)	Aljon Mariano	6 ft 3 in (1.91 m)	175 lb (79 kg)	1992–08–03	UST
F	32	(United States)	Justin Brownlee (GI)	6 ft 6 in (1.98 m)	220 lb (100 kg)	1988–04–23	St. John's
F/C	38	(United States)	Joe Devance	6 ft 7 in (2.01 m)	225 lb (102 kg)	1982–02–19	UTEP
F/C	88	(Philippines)	Ben Adamos	6 ft 7 in (2.01 m)	200 lb (91 kg)	1995–12–30	UPHSD

Head coach

- (United States) Tim Cone

Assistant coach(es)

- (Philippines) Richard del Rosario (1st assistant)
- (United States) Kirk Collier
- (Philippines) Jamil Lipae
- (Philippines) Patrick Partosa
- (Philippines) Olsen Racela

Team manager

- (Philippines) Alfrancis Chua^{[a]}
- (Philippines) Raymond Rodriguez (assistant)

Legend

- (C) Team captain
- (CI) Commissioner's Cup Import
- (GI) Governors' Cup Import
- (EI) EASL Import
- (DP) Unsigned draft pick
- (FA) Free agent
- (IN) Inactive
- (S) Suspended
- (R) Rookie
- Injured

Roster

- ^{a} Also serves as Barangay Ginebra's board governor.

== Broadcast notes ==
The Governors' Cup Finals will be aired live on RPTV with simulcast on PBA Rush and Pilipinas Live (both in standard and high definition).

The PBA Rush broadcast will provide the English language coverage of the Finals.

The Pilipinas Live broadcast will provide the English-Filipino language coverage of the Finals.

Game	RPTV			PBA Rush			Arena Plus Xs and Os
Game	Play-by-play	Analyst(s)	Courtside Reporters	Play-by-play	Analyst	Courtside Reporters	Hosts
Game 1	Magoo Marjon	Quinito Henson and Yeng Guiao	Belle Gregorio and Eileen Shi	Carlo Pamintuan	Eric Reyes	Bea Escudero	Anton Roxas, Ryan Gregorio and Nico Salva
Game 2	Charlie Cuna	Andy Jao, Jong Uichico and Ryan Gregorio	Apple David	Andre Co	Ronnie Magsanoc	Pauline Verzosa	Anton Roxas, Ryan Gregorio and Nico Salva
Game 3	Magoo Marjon	Dominic Uy, Jeffrey Cariaso and Ronnie Magsanoc	Belle Gregorio	Carlo Pamintuan	Andy Jao	Doreen Suaybaguio	Anton Roxas, Ryan Gregorio and Ronnie Magsanoc
Game 4	Charlie Cuna	Quinito Henson, Luigi Trillo and Nico Salva	Belle Gregorio	Andre Co	Eric Altamirano	Bea Escudero	Anton Roxas, Ryan Gregorio and Nico Salva
Game 5	Sev Sarmenta	Dominic Uy and Norman Black	Eileen Shi				Anton Roxas, Ryan Gregorio and Nico Salva
Game 6	Sev Sarmenta	Quinito Henson and Yeng Guiao	Apple David				Anton Roxas, Ryan Gregorio and Ronnie Magsanoc

- Additional game 6 crew:
  - Trophy presentation: Carlo Pamintuan
  - Celebration interviewer: Apple David and Bea Escudero
