= 2023–24 TNT Tropang Giga season =

- Head coach: Jojo Lastimosa (Commissioner's Cup); Chot Reyes
- General Manager: Jojo Lastimosa; Miguel Fernandez (assistant)
- Owner(s): Smart Communications (an MVP Group subsidiary)

Commissioner's Cup results
- Record: 5–6 (45.5%)
- Place: 8th
- Playoff finish: Quarterfinalist (lost to Magnolia with twice-to-win disadvantage)

Philippine Cup results
- Record: 6–5 (54.5%)
- Place: 4th
- Playoff finish: Quarterfinalist (lost to Rain or Shine, 1–2)

TNT Tropang Giga seasons

The 2023–24 TNT Tropang Giga season was the 33rd season of the franchise in the Philippine Basketball Association (PBA).

== Key dates ==
- September 17: The PBA season 48 draft was held at the Market! Market! in Taguig.

== Draft picks ==
TNT did not pick in this draft.

== Roster ==
2023–24 TNT Tropang Giga roster
Players
Coaches

Pos.	#	POB	Name	Height	Weight	DOB (YYYY–MM–DD)	From
F/C	0	(Philippines)	Barkley Eboña	6 ft 6 in (1.98 m)	194 lb (88 kg)	1996–11–29	Far Eastern
C	7	(Philippines)	Poy Erram	6 ft 8 in (2.03 m)	227 lb (103 kg)	1989–07–07	Ateneo
F	8	(Philippines)	Calvin Oftana	6 ft 5 in (1.96 m)	196 lb (89 kg)	1996–01–03	San Beda
F	9	(United States)	Paul Varilla	6 ft 3 in (1.91 m)		1993–08–10	UE
G	10	(Philippines)	Ryan Reyes	6 ft 2 in (1.88 m)	190 lb (86 kg)	1983–08–10	Cal State Fullerton
F	12	(Philippines)	Glenn Khobuntin	6 ft 4 in (1.93 m)	195 lb (88 kg)	1991–09–07	National-U
G	13	(Philippines)	Brian Heruela	5 ft 10 in (1.78 m)	195 lb (88 kg)	1989–04–13	Cebu
G	15	(Philippines)	Kib Montalbo	6 ft 0 in (1.83 m)	155 lb (70 kg)	1996–04–02	De La Salle
G/F	16	(Philippines)	Roger Pogoy	6 ft 2 in (1.88 m)	180 lb (82 kg)	1992–06–16	Far Eastern
G	17	(Philippines)	Jayson Castro	5 ft 10 in (1.78 m)	185 lb (84 kg)	1986–06–30	Philippine Christian
F/C	21	(United States)	Kelly Williams (C)	6 ft 6 in (1.98 m)	215 lb (98 kg)	1982–02–07	Oakland
G/F	24	(Philippines)	Matt Ganuelas-Rosser	6 ft 4 in (1.93 m)	186 lb (84 kg)	1990–06–13	Cal Poly Pomona
F/C	27	(Philippines)	Jewel Ponferada	6 ft 5 in (1.96 m)	211 lb (96 kg)	1988–07–08	National-U
C	32	(United States)	Henry Galinato (R)	6 ft 6 in (1.98 m)	245 lb (111 kg)	1997–09–09	Philippines
G/F	35	(Philippines)	Kim Aurin (R)	6 ft 1 in (1.85 m)	190 lb (86 kg)	1997–02–05	UPHSD
F/C	45	(United States)	Brandon Ganuelas-Rosser	6 ft 6 in (1.98 m)	220 lb (100 kg)	1994–06–29	UC Riverside

Head coach

- (Philippines) Chot Reyes

Assistant coach(es)

- (Philippines) Josh Reyes (1st assistant)
- (Philippines) Sandy Arespacochaga
- (Philippines) Mau Belen
- (Philippines) Ranidel de Ocampo
- (Philippines) Yuri Escueta
- (Philippines) Bong Ravena

Team manager

- (Philippines) Jojo Lastimosa
- (Philippines) Miguel Fernandez (assistant)

Legend

- (C) Team captain
- (CI) Commissioner's Cup Import
- (GI) Governors' Cup Import
- (EI) EASL Import
- (DP) Unsigned draft pick
- (FA) Free agent
- (IN) Inactive
- (S) Suspended
- (R) Rookie
- Injured

Roster

== Preseason ==
=== PBA on Tour ===
==== Game log ====
2023 PBA on Tour game log
Total: 1–10
June: 0–5

Game	Date	Opponent	Score	High points	High rebounds	High assists	Location Attendance	Record
1	June 2	NorthPort	L 90–99	Glenn Khobuntin (24)	Glenn Khobuntin (8)	Kib Montalbo (7)	Ynares Center	0–1
2	June 7	Terrafirma	L 92–104	Glenn Khobuntin (25)	Glenn Khobuntin (9)	Kib Montalbo (10)	Ynares Sports Arena	0–2
3	June 16	Magnolia	L 63–96	Glenn Khobuntin (23)	Dave Marcelo (7)	Alfaro, Varilla (3)	Ynares Sports Arena	0–3
4	June 21	Converge	L 84–109	Glenn Khobuntin (22)	Jopia, Marcelo (6)	Jaydee Tungcab (5)	Ynares Sports Arena	0–4
5	June 28	Meralco	L 90–108	Glenn Khobuntin (28)	Jaydee Tungcab (8)	Jaydee Tungcab (5)	Ynares Sports Arena	0–5

July: 1–5

Game	Date	Opponent	Score	High points	High rebounds	High assists	Location Attendance	Record
6	July 7	San Miguel	L 74–111	Jaydee Tungcab (30)	Carl Bryan Cruz (8)	Cuntapay, Montalbo, Tungcab (3)	Ynares Sports Arena	0–6
7	July 12	Rain or Shine	L 100–106	Glenn Khobuntin (24)	Glenn Khobuntin (15)	Jaydee Tungcab (4)	Ynares Sports Arena	0–7
8	July 12	Phoenix Super LPG	W 96–88	Glenn Khobuntin (21)	Lervin Flores (13)	Kib Montalbo (5)	Ynares Sports Arena	1–7
9	July 21	Barangay Ginebra	L 67–81	Glenn Khobuntin (25)	Glenn Khobuntin (9)	Kib Montalbo (5)	Ynares Sports Arena	1–8
10	July 26	NLEX	L 84–97	Carl Bryan Cruz (26)	Glenn Khobuntin (10)	Brian Heruela (6)	Filoil EcoOil Centre	1–9
11	July 30	Blackwater	L 78–101	Glenn Khobuntin (14)	Jaydee Tungcab (8)	M. Ganuelas-Rosser, Tungcab (4)	Ynares Sports Arena	1–10

== Commissioner's Cup ==
=== Eliminations ===
==== Standings ====
Pos	Team	W	L	PCT	GB	Qualification
1	Magnolia Chicken Timplados Hotshots	9	2	.818	—	Twice-to-beat in quarterfinals
2	San Miguel Beermen	8	3	.727 (Note: Head-to-head quotient: San Miguel 1.17, Barangay Ginebra 0.99, Phoenix Super LPG 0.98, Meralco 0.89)	1	Twice-to-beat in quarterfinals
3	Barangay Ginebra San Miguel	8	3	.727	1	Twice-to-beat in quarterfinals
4	Phoenix Super LPG Fuel Masters	8	3	.727	1	Twice-to-beat in quarterfinals
5	Meralco Bolts	8	3	.727	1	Twice-to-win in quarterfinals
6	NorthPort Batang Pier	6	5	.545 (Note: Head-to-head record: NorthPort 1–0 Rain or Shine)	3	Twice-to-win in quarterfinals
7	Rain or Shine Elasto Painters	6	5	.545	3	Twice-to-win in quarterfinals
8	TNT Tropang Giga	5	6	.455	4	Twice-to-win in quarterfinals
9	NLEX Road Warriors	4	7	.364	5	
10	Terrafirma Dyip	2	9	.182	7	
11	Blackwater Bossing	1	10	.091 (Note: Head-to-head record: Blackwater 1–0 Converge)	8	
12	Converge FiberXers	1	10	.091	8	

Source: PBA.ph
Rules for classification: 1) winning percentage; 2) if two teams are tied, head-to-head record; if three or more teams are tied, head-to-head goal average (quotient); if tied for 8th, one-game playoff; 3) overall quotient; 4) coin toss

==== Game log ====
2023–24 PBA Commissioner's Cup game log
Total: 5–6
November: 2–2

Game	Date	Opponent	Score	High points	High rebounds	High assists	Location Attendance	Record
1	November 5	Magnolia	L 102–110	Quincy Miller (37)	Quincy Miller (14)	Jayson Castro (7)	Smart Araneta Coliseum	0–1
2	November 11	Converge	W 101–98 (OT)	Jayson Castro (23)	Ro. Hollis-Jefferson, Khobuntin (11)	Brian Heruela (5)	Ynares Center	1–1
3	November 22	Terrafirma	W 133–93	Rondae Hollis-Jefferson (37)	Glenn Khobuntin (11)	Calvin Oftana (7)	Smart Araneta Coliseum	2–1
4	November 26	Meralco	L 95–109	Rondae Hollis-Jefferson (47)	Kelly Williams (13)	Jayson Castro (5)	PhilSports Arena	2–2

December: 2–3

Game	Date	Opponent	Score	High points	High rebounds	High assists	Location Attendance	Record
5	December 1	NorthPort	L 123–128 (OT)	Rondae Hollis-Jefferson (35)	Rondae Hollis-Jefferson (13)	Rondae Hollis-Jefferson (8)	PhilSports Arena	2–3
6	December 13	NLEX	W 113–97	Rondae Hollis-Jefferson (33)	Rondae Hollis-Jefferson (15)	Kib Montalbo (7)	PhilSports Arena	3–3
7	December 15	Blackwater	W 105–96	Rondae Hollis-Jefferson (42)	Rondae Hollis-Jefferson (12)	Rondae Hollis-Jefferson (8)	Smart Araneta Coliseum	4–3
8	December 17	San Miguel	L 93–98	Calvin Oftana (27)	Rondae Hollis-Jefferson (15)	Kib Montalbo (6)	Ynares Center	4–4
9	December 25	Barangay Ginebra	L 78–86	Calvin Oftana (27)	Henry Galinato (9)	Kib Montalbo (5)	Smart Araneta Coliseum	4–5

January: 1–1

Game	Date	Opponent	Score	High points	High rebounds	High assists	Location Attendance	Record
10	January 5	Rain or Shine	L 112–119	Rahlir Hollis-Jefferson (50)	Rahlir Hollis-Jefferson (16)	Rahlir Hollis-Jefferson (4)	Smart Araneta Coliseum	4–6
11	January 14	Phoenix Super LPG	W 116–96	Rahlir Hollis-Jefferson (35)	Henry Galinato (11)	Rahlir Hollis-Jefferson (11)	PhilSports Arena	5–6

=== Playoffs ===
==== Bracket ====
Quarterfinals (Top 4 twice-to-beat)
1	Magnolia	109
8	TNT	94
4	Phoenix Super LPG	107	88
5	Meralco	116***	84
2	San Miguel	127
7	Rain or Shine	122
3	Barangay Ginebra	106
6	NorthPort	93

Semifinals (Best-of-5)
1	Magnolia	3
4	Phoenix Super LPG	1
2	San Miguel	3
3	Barangay Ginebra	0

Finals (Best-of-7)
1	Magnolia	2
2	San Miguel	4

***Game went into triple overtime

==== Game log ====
2023–24 PBA Commissioner's Cup playoffs game log
Total: 0–1
Quarterfinals: 0–1

Game	Date	Opponent	Score	High points	High rebounds	High assists	Location Attendance	Series
1	January 17	Magnolia	L 94–109	Rahlir Hollis-Jefferson (27)	Rahlir Hollis-Jefferson (9)	Rahlir Hollis-Jefferson (11)	PhilSports Arena	0–1

== Philippine Cup ==
=== Eliminations ===
==== Standings ====
Pos	Team	W	L	PCT	GB	Qualification
1	San Miguel Beermen	10	1	.909	—	Twice-to-beat in the quarterfinals
2	Barangay Ginebra San Miguel	7	4	.636	3	Twice-to-beat in the quarterfinals
3	Meralco Bolts	6	5	.545 (Note: Head-to-head quotient: Meralco 1.06, TNT 1.03, Rain or Shine 1.01, NLEX 0.99, Magnolia 0.90)	4	Best-of-three quarterfinals
4	TNT Tropang Giga	6	5	.545	4	Best-of-three quarterfinals
5	Rain or Shine Elasto Painters	6	5	.545	4	Best-of-three quarterfinals
6	NLEX Road Warriors	6	5	.545	4	Best-of-three quarterfinals
7	Magnolia Chicken Timplados Hotshots	6	5	.545	4	Twice-to-win in the quarterfinals
8	Terrafirma Dyip	5	6	.455 (Note: Eighth seed playoff: Terrafirma 104–96 NorthPort)	5	Twice-to-win in the quarterfinals
9	NorthPort Batang Pier	5	6	.455	5	
10	Blackwater Bossing	4	7	.364	6	
11	Phoenix Fuel Masters	3	8	.273	7	
12	Converge FiberXers	2	9	.182	8	

Source: PBA.ph
Rules for classification: 1) winning percentage; 2) if two teams are tied, head-to-head record; if three or more teams are tied, head-to-head goal average (quotient); if tied for 8th, one-game playoff; 3) overall quotient; 4) coin toss

==== Game log ====
2024 PBA Philippine Cup game log
Total: 6–5
February: 1–0

Game	Date	Opponent	Score	High points	High rebounds	High assists	Location Attendance	Record
1	February 28	Rain or Shine	W 108–107	Calvin Oftana (23)	B. Ganuelas-Rosser, Oftana (14)	Jayson Castro (7)	Ynares Center	1–0

March: 1–2

Game	Date	Opponent	Score	High points	High rebounds	High assists	Location Attendance	Record
2	March 2	Blackwater	L 76–87	Calvin Oftana (21)	Brandon Ganuelas-Rosser (8)	Castro, Oftana (4)	Smart Araneta Coliseum	1–1
3	March 9	Terrafirma	W 100–97	Jayson Castro (23)	Henry Galinato (11)	Ryan Reyes (4)	Smart Araneta Coliseum	2–1
4	March 17	San Miguel	L 89–91	Jayson Castro (20)	Calvin Oftana (8)	Jayson Castro (6)	Ynares Center	2–2
All-Star Break

April: 3–2

Game	Date	Opponent	Score	High points	High rebounds	High assists	Location Attendance	Record
5	April 5	NorthPort	L 96–112	Roger Pogoy (34)	Henry Galinato (11)	Castro, Oftana (4)	Smart Araneta Coliseum	2–3
6	April 7	Meralco	W 92–90	Calvin Oftana (26)	Kelly Williams (13)	Aurin, Pogoy (2)	Ninoy Aquino Stadium	3–3
7	April 13	NLEX	W 104–101	Calvin Oftana (37)	Calvin Oftana (12)	Calvin Oftana (6)	Candon City Arena	4–3
8	April 19	Barangay Ginebra	L 83–87	Oftana, Pogoy (19)	Kelly Williams (8)	Jayson Castro (8)	PhilSports Arena	4–4
9	April 24	Phoenix	W 108–101	Roger Pogoy (23)	Kelly Williams (13)	Castro, Montalbo (4)	Ninoy Aquino Stadium	5–4

May: 1–1

Game	Date	Opponent	Score	High points	High rebounds	High assists	Location Attendance	Record
10	May 1	Converge	L 103–107	Calvin Oftana (33)	Calvin Oftana (12)	Kib Montalbo (9)	PhilSports Arena	5–5
11	May 5	Magnolia	W 98–93	Kelly Williams (19)	Calvin Oftana (11)	Jayson Castro (7)	Ninoy Aquino Stadium	6–5

=== Playoffs ===
==== Bracket ====
Quarterfinals
(#1 twice-to-beat)
1	San Miguel	95	110
8	Terrafirma	106	91
(Best-of-3)
4	TNT	1
5	Rain or Shine	2
(#2 twice-to-beat)
2	Barangay Ginebra	99
7	Magnolia	77
(Best-of-3)
3	Meralco	2
6	NLEX	0

Semifinals (Best-of-7)
1	San Miguel	4
5	Rain or Shine	0
2	Barangay Ginebra	3
3	Meralco	4

Finals (Best-of-7)
1	San Miguel	2
3	Meralco	4

==== Game log ====
2024 PBA Philippine Cup playoffs game log
Total: 1–2
Quarterfinals: 1–2

Game	Date	Opponent	Score	High points	High rebounds	High assists	Location Attendance	Series
1	May 8	Rain or Shine	W 116–99	Calvin Oftana (32)	Kelly Williams (10)	Castro, Pogoy (5)	Smart Araneta Coliseum	1–0
2	May 10	Rain or Shine	L 113–121	Roger Pogoy (28)	Glenn Khobuntin (9)	Jayson Castro (8)	Rizal Memorial Coliseum	1–1
3	May 13	Rain or Shine	L 109–110	Kelly Williams (32)	Kelly Williams (14)	Castro, Pogoy, Oftana (4)	Ninoy Aquino Stadium	1–2

== East Asia Super League ==
=== Group stage ===
==== Standings ====
Pos	Team	Pld	W	L	PF	PA	PD	Qualification
1	(Japan) Chiba Jets	6	6	0	546	450	+96	Semifinals
2	(South Korea) Anyang JKJ Red Boosters	6	4	2	542	537	+5	Semifinals
3	(Philippines) TNT Tropang Giga	6	1 (Note: TNT Tropang Giga 177–175 Taipei Fubon Braves)	5	491	536	−45	
4	(Chinese Taipei) Taipei Fubon Braves	6	1	5	464	520	−56	

Source: EASL

==== Game log ====
11 October 2023	Chiba Jets (Japan)	93–75	(Philippines) TNT Tropang Giga	Funabashi
19:00 (JST)	Scoring by quarter: 21–22, 24–22, 26–12, 22–19
	Pts: Brown, Stephens 19; Rebs: Brown 12; Asts: Ogawa 6	Boxscore	Pts: Miller 22; Rebs: Hollis-Jefferson 9 Asts: Hollis-Jefferson, Montalbo 5	Arena: Funabashi Arena; Attendance: 3,667

1 November 2023	TNT Tropang Giga (Philippines)	66–75	(Japan) Chiba Jets	Santa Rosa
19:00 (PST)	Scoring by quarter: 14–23, 18–27, 24–14, 10–11
	Pts: Miller 22; Rebs: Miller 13; Asts: Castro, Oftana 3	Boxscore	Pts: Mooney 30; Rebs: Mooney 16; Asts: Togashi 5	Arena: City of Santa Rosa Multi-Purpose Complex

15 November 2023	Taipei Fubon Braves (Chinese Taipei)	106–97	(Philippines) TNT Tropang Giga	Taipei
19:00 (TST)	Scoring by quarter: 31–34, 23–18, 30–23, 22–22
	Pts: Johnson 29; Rebs: Singletary 9 Asts: Barefield 7	Boxscore	Pts: Miller 34; Rebs: Miller 10; Asts: Hollis-Jefferson 10	Arena: Taipei Heping Basketball Gymnasium

6 December 2023	Anyang JKJ Red Boosters (South Korea)	105–97	(Philippines) TNT Tropang Giga	Anyang
19:00 (KST)	Scoring by quarter: 32–26, 26–18, 22–23, 25–30
	Pts: Choi 24; Rebs: Monroe 10; Asts: Park 10	Boxscore	Pts: Miller 35; Rebs: Miller 9 Asts: Hollis-Jefferson, Montalbo 5	Arena: Anyang Gymnasium

20 December 2023	TNT Tropang Giga (Philippines)	80–69	(Chinese Taipei) Taipei Fubon Braves	Santa Rosa
19:00 (PST)	Scoring by quarter: 17–21, 31–21, 14–16, 18–11
	Pts: Ro. Hollis-Jefferson 35; Rebs: Ro. Hollis-Jefferson 11; Asts: Ro. Hollis-Jefferson 5	Boxscore	Pts: Johnson 19; Rebs: Johnson 20; Asts: Chou 6	Arena: City of Santa Rosa Multi-Purpose Complex

24 January 2024	TNT Tropang Giga (Philippines)	76–88	(South Korea) Anyang JKJ Red Boosters	Pasig
19:00 (PST)	Scoring by quarter: 19–34, 22–19, 20–18, 15–17
	Pts: Ro. Hollis-Jefferson 33; Rebs: Ra. Hollis-Jefferson 12; Asts: Ro. Hollis-Jefferson 7	Boxscore	Pts: Choi 23; Rebs: Carter, Wilson 14; Asts: Carter, Park 7	Arena: PhilSports Arena

== Transactions ==
=== Free agency ===
==== Signings ====
Player	Date signed	Contract amount	Contract length	Former team
Dave Marcelo	May 16, 2023	Not disclosed	1 year	Re-signed
Carl Bryan Cruz	May 16, 2023	Not disclosed	1 year	Re-signed
Roger Pogoy	June 26, 2023	Not disclosed	3 years	Re-signed
Glenn Khobuntin	October 2, 2023	Not disclosed	3 years	Re-signed
Mike Tolomia	November 10, 2023	Not disclosed	1 conference	Zamboanga Valientes (Pilipinas VisMin Super Cup)
Barkley Eboña	February 19, 2024	Not disclosed	1 year	Converge FiberXers
Kim Aurin	February 20, 2024	Not disclosed	2 years	Re-signed

==== Subtractions ====
Player	Number	Position	Reason	New team
Mikey Williams	5	Shooting guard / Point guard	Contract termination	

=== Trades ===
==== Pre-season ====
September
September 21, 2023	To TNT Henry Galinato Jewel Ponferada	To Rain or Shine Dave Marcelo 2024 TNT first-round pick

==== Mid-season ====
February
February 26, 2024
February 26, 2024	To TNT Brandon Ganuelas-Rosser	To Blackwater Justin Chua; Jaydee Tungcab; 2025 TNT first-round pick	To NLEX Yousef Taha; Ato Ular; 2025 Blackwater first-round pick

=== Recruited imports ===
Tournament	Name	Debuted	Last game	Record
Commissioner's Cup	Quincy Miller	November 5, 2023 (vs. Magnolia)		0–1
Commissioner's Cup	Rondae Hollis-Jefferson	November 11, 2023 (vs. Converge)	December 17, 2023 (vs. San Miguel)	4–3
Commissioner's Cup	Rahlir Hollis-Jefferson	January 5, 2024 (vs. Rain or Shine)	January 17, 2024 (vs. Magnolia)	1–2

== Awards ==
Recipient	Honors	Date awarded
Calvin Oftana	2023–24 PBA Mythical Second Team	August 18, 2024
