= Barkley Eboña =

Filipino basketball player (born 1996)

No. 88 – Ilagan Isabela Cowboys
- Position: Power forward / center
- League: MPBL

Personal information
- Born: November 29, 1996 (age 29) Cebu City, Philippines
- Listed height: 6 ft 6 in (1.98 m)
- Listed weight: 194 lb (88 kg)

Career information
- High school: CIT (Cebu City)
- College: FEU
- PBA draft: 2019: 1st round, 4th overall pick
- Drafted by: Alaska Aces
- Playing career: 2020–present

Career history
- 2020–2021: Alaska Aces
- 2021–2022: Blackwater Bossing
- 2023: Converge FiberXers
- 2024–2025: TNT Tropang Giga/5G
- 2026: Imus Bandera
- 2026–present: Ilagan Isabela Cowboys

Career highlights
- 2× PBA champion (2024 Governors', 2024–25 Commissioner's); PBA All-Rookie Team (2020); UAAP champion (2015)

Kevin Barkley Eboña (born November 29, 1996) is a Filipino basketball player for the Ilagan Isabela Cowboys of the Maharlika Pilipinas Basketball League (MPBL). He was drafted 4th overall pick in the 1st round of the 2019 PBA draft.

== Professional career ==
Eboña was drafted fourth overall by the Alaska Aces during the 2019 PBA draft.

On October 13, 2021, Eboña, along with JVee Casio, was traded to the Blackwater Bossing for Mike Tolomia and a 2022 second-round pick. On December 30, Eboña signed a two-year contract extension with the Bossing.

On January 3, 2023, Eboña, along with a 2022 first-round pick, was traded to the Converge FiberXers for Michael DiGregorio, Tyrus Hill and RK Ilagan. Eboña became an unrestricted free agent on January 1, 2024.

On February 19, 2024, Eboña signed a one-year contract with the TNT Tropang Giga. On September 25, 2025, Eboña was released by the team.

== PBA career statistics ==
Legend
GP	Games played	MPG	Minutes per game	FG%	Field-goal percentage
3FG%	3-point field-goal percentage	4P%	4-point field-goal percentage	FT%	Free-throw percentage
RPG	Rebounds per game	APG	Assists per game	SPG	Steals per game
BPG	Blocks per game	PPG	Points per game	127	Career high

As of the end of 2024–25 season

=== Season-by-season averages ===
Year	Team	GP	MPG	FG%	3P%	4P%	FT%	RPG	APG	SPG	BPG	PPG
2020	Alaska	12	18.4	.593	.000	—	.636	3.3	.9	.5	.5	7.0
2021	Alaska	17	18.3	.447	.000	—	.614	4.4	.8	.4	.2	5.6
2021	Blackwater	17	18.3	.447	.000	—	.614	4.4	.8	.4	.2	5.6
2022–23	Blackwater	31	13.6	.381	.375	—	.476	2.9	.6	.2	.4	3.0
2022–23	Converge	31	13.6	.381	.375	—	.476	2.9	.6	.2	.4	3.0
2023–24	Converge	9	5.4	.800	—	—	—	.9	.2	.1	—	.9
2023–24	TNT	9	5.4	.800	—	—	—	.9	.2	.1	—	.9
2024–25	TNT	20	6.1	.368	—	—	.500	1.7	.6	.1	.2	1.0
Career		89	12.6	.455	.188	—	.576	2.8	.6	.2	.3	3.4
