= 2024–25 San Miguel Beermen season =

- Head coach: Jorge Gallent (Governors' Cup & Commissioner's Cup); Leo Austria
- General manager: Gee Abanilla; Daniel Henares (assistant)
- Owners: San Miguel Brewery, Inc. (a San Miguel Corporation subsidiary)

Governors' Cup results
- Record: 6–4 (60%)
- Place: 2nd in group B
- Playoff finish: Semifinalist (lost to Barangay Ginebra, 2–4)

Commissioner's Cup results
- Record: 5–7 (41.7%)
- Place: 10th
- Playoff finish: Did not qualify

Philippine Cup results
- Record: 8–3 (72.7%)
- Place: 1st
- Playoff finish: Champions (def. TNT, 4–2)

San Miguel Beermen seasons

The 2024–25 San Miguel Beermen season was the 49th season of the franchise in the Philippine Basketball Association (PBA).

== Key dates ==
- July 14: The PBA season 49 draft was held at the Glorietta Activity Center in Makati.

== Draft picks ==
| Round | Pick | Player | Position | Place of birth | College |
|---|---|---|---|---|---|
| 1 | 12 | Avan Nava | G | Canada | St. Francis Xavier |
| 3 | 36 | Abdul Sawat | F | Philippines | UE |
| 4 | 44 | Ralph Robin | G | Philippines | EAC |

== Roster ==
2024–25 San Miguel Beermen roster
Players
Coaches

| Pos. | # | POB | Name | Height | Weight | DOB (YYYY–MM–DD) | From |
|---|---|---|---|---|---|---|---|
| G | 1 | (United States) | Kris Rosales | 6 ft 0 in (1.83 m) | 165 lb (75 kg) | 1990–12–20 | Hope International |
| F | 2 | (Philippines) | Don Trollano | 6 ft 3 in (1.91 m) | 182 lb (83 kg) | 1992–01–07 | Adamson |
| F/C | 3 | (United States) | Moala Tautuaa | 6 ft 8 in (2.03 m) | 245 lb (111 kg) | 1989–04–30 | Chadron State |
| G | 6 | (United States) | Chris Ross | 6 ft 1 in (1.85 m) | 180 lb (82 kg) | 1985–03–09 | Marshall |
| F | 11 | (Sweden) | Andreas Cahilig | 6 ft 5 in (1.96 m) | | 1991–01–22 | EARIST |
| G/F | 13 | (United States) | Marcio Lassiter | 6 ft 2 in (1.88 m) | 185 lb (84 kg) | 1987–05–16 | Cal State Fullerton |
| C | 15 | (Philippines) | June Mar Fajardo | 6 ft 10 in (2.08 m) | 268 lb (122 kg) | 1989–11–17 | Cebu |
| G/F | 21 | (Philippines) | Jeron Teng | 6 ft 2 in (1.88 m) | 185 lb (84 kg) | 1994–03–21 | De La Salle |
| C | 22 | (Philippines) | JM Calma | 6 ft 6 in (1.98 m) | 193 lb (88 kg) | 1997–12–02 | San Sebastian |
| G | 33 | (Philippines) | Juami Tiongson | 5 ft 10 in (1.78 m) | 175 lb (79 kg) | 1991–02–05 | Ateneo |
| G | 39 | (Philippines) | Jericho Cruz | 6 ft 1 in (1.85 m) | 190 lb (86 kg) | 1990–10–11 | Adamson |
| G/F | 77 | (Hong Kong) | CJ Perez (C) | 6 ft 2 in (1.88 m) | 185 lb (84 kg) | 1993–11–17 | Lyceum |
| F | 91 | (Philippines) | Rodney Brondial | 6 ft 5 in (1.96 m) | 210 lb (95 kg) | 1990–11–20 | Adamson |

Head coach

- (Philippines) Leo Austria

Assistant coach(es)

- (Philippines) Peter Martin (1st assistant)
- (Philippines) Ato Agustin
- (Philippines) Dayong Mendoza
- (Philippines) Biboy Ravanes
- (United States) Chris Ross
- (Philippines) Boyzie Zamar
- (Philippines) Jorge Gallent (consultant)

Team manager

- (Philippines) Gee Abanilla
- (Philippines) Daniel Henares (assistant)

Legend

- (C) Team captain
- (CI) Commissioner's Cup Import
- (GI) Governors' Cup Import
- (EI) EASL Import
- (DP) Unsigned draft pick
- (FA) Free agent
- (IN) Inactive
- (S) Suspended
- (R) Rookie
- Injured

Roster

== Governors' Cup ==
=== Eliminations ===
==== Group B Standings ====
| Pos | Team | W | L | PCT | GB | Qualification |
|---|---|---|---|---|---|---|
| 1 | Rain or Shine Elasto Painters | 7 | 3 | .700 | — | Quarterfinals |
| 2 | San Miguel Beermen | 6 | 4 | .600 (Note: Head-to-head record: San Miguel 1–1 Barangay Ginebra (San Miguel 1.23, Barangay Ginebra 0.82)) | 1 | Quarterfinals |
| 3 | Barangay Ginebra San Miguel | 6 | 4 | .600 | 1 | Quarterfinals |
| 4 | NLEX Road Warriors | 5 | 5 | .500 (Note: Head-to-head record: NLEX 1–1 Blackwater (NLEX 1.03, Blackwater 0.97)) | 2 | Quarterfinals |
| 5 | Blackwater Bossing | 5 | 5 | .500 | 2 | |
| 6 | Phoenix Fuel Masters | 1 | 9 | .100 | 6 | |

Source: PBA.ph
Rules for classification: 1) winning percentage; 2) if two teams are tied, head-to-head record, if three or more teams are tied, head-to-head goal average (quotient); 3) overall quotient; 4) coin toss

==== Game log ====
2024 PBA Governors' Cup game log
Total: 6–4
August: 2–2

| Game | Date | Opponent | Score | High points | High rebounds | High assists | Location Attendance | Record |
|---|---|---|---|---|---|---|---|---|
| 1 | August 21 | Phoenix | W 111–97 | June Mar Fajardo (37) | June Mar Fajardo (24) | Adams, Fajardo (4) | Smart Araneta Coliseum | 1–0 |
| 2 | August 25 | Blackwater | W 128–108 | Jordan Adams (50) | Jordan Adams (11) | Jericho Cruz (6) | Smart Araneta Coliseum | 2–0 |
| 3 | August 27 | Barangay Ginebra | L 102–108 | Jordan Adams (23) | June Mar Fajardo (17) | CJ Perez (7) | Smart Araneta Coliseum | 2–1 |
| 4 | August 31 | NLEX | L 108–112 (OT) | Jordan Adams (36) | June Mar Fajardo (17) | CJ Perez (9) | Aquilino Q. Pimentel Jr. International Convention Center | 2–2 |

September: 4–2

| Game | Date | Opponent | Score | High points | High rebounds | High assists | Location Attendance | Record |
|---|---|---|---|---|---|---|---|---|
| 5 | September 5 | Rain or Shine | W 113–112 | Jordan Adams (41) | June Mar Fajardo (21) | CJ Perez (8) | Ninoy Aquino Stadium | 3–2 |
| 6 | September 11 | NLEX | W 119–114 | CJ Perez (24) | June Mar Fajardo (9) | Chris Ross (4) | Ninoy Aquino Stadium | 4–2 |
| 7 | September 13 | Phoenix | W 139–127 | Jordan Adams (49) | Adams, Fajardo (11) | CJ Perez (7) | Smart Araneta Coliseum | 5–2 |
| 8 | September 15 | Barangay Ginebra | W 131–82 | June Mar Fajardo (24) | June Mar Fajardo (17) | CJ Perez (6) | Smart Araneta Coliseum | 6–2 |
| 9 | September 19 | Rain or Shine | L 112–122 | CJ Perez (27) | June Mar Fajardo (12) | CJ Perez (6) | Ninoy Aquino Stadium | 6–3 |
| 10 | September 21 | Blackwater | L 94–111 | June Mar Fajardo (23) | Brondial, Fajardo (12) | June Mar Fajardo (4) | Ninoy Aquino Stadium | 6–4 |

=== Playoffs ===
==== Bracket ====
Quarterfinals (Best-of-5)
A1 | TNT | 3
B4 | NLEX | 1
B1 | Rain or Shine | 3
A4 | Magnolia | 2
B2 | San Miguel | 3
A3 | Converge | 2
A2 | Meralco | 0
B3 | Barangay Ginebra | 3

Semifinals (Best-of-7)
A1 | TNT | 4
B1 | Rain or Shine | 1
B2 | San Miguel | 2
B3 | Barangay Ginebra | 4

Finals (Best-of-7)
A1 | TNT | 4
B3 | Barangay Ginebra | 2

==== Game log ====
2024 PBA Governors' Cup playoffs game log
Total: 5–6
Quarterfinals: 3–2

| Game | Date | Opponent | Score | High points | High rebounds | High assists | Location Attendance | Series |
|---|---|---|---|---|---|---|---|---|
| 1 | September 26 | Converge | W 102–95 | E.J. Anosike (28) | June Mar Fajardo (16) | Anosike, Perez (5) | Ninoy Aquino Stadium | 1–0 |
| 2 | September 28 | Converge | W 107–100 | E.J. Anosike (41) | June Mar Fajardo (16) | CJ Perez (8) | Smart Araneta Coliseum | 2–0 |
| 3 | September 30 | Converge | L 112–114 | E.J. Anosike (39) | June Mar Fajardo (16) | Anosike, Ross (5) | Ninoy Aquino Stadium | 2–1 |
| 4 | October 4 | Converge | L 100–114 | E.J. Anosike (35) | June Mar Fajardo (20) | Jericho Cruz (5) | Ninoy Aquino Stadium | 2–2 |
| 5 | October 6 | Converge | W 109–105 | June Mar Fajardo (40) | June Mar Fajardo (24) | CJ Perez (9) | Ynares Center | 3–2 |

Semifinals: 2–4

| Game | Date | Opponent | Score | High points | High rebounds | High assists | Location Attendance | Series |
|---|---|---|---|---|---|---|---|---|
| 1 | October 9 | Barangay Ginebra | L 105–122 | E.J. Anosike (27) | June Mar Fajardo (16) | June Mar Fajardo (7) | PhilSports Arena | 0–1 |
| 2 | October 11 | Barangay Ginebra | W 131–125 (OT) | E.J. Anosike (35) | June Mar Fajardo (21) | CJ Perez (7) | Smart Araneta Coliseum | 1–1 |
| 3 | October 13 | Barangay Ginebra | L 94–99 | E.J. Anosike (32) | June Mar Fajardo (14) | CJ Perez (6) | Dasmariñas Arena | 1–2 |
| 4 | October 15 | Barangay Ginebra | W 131–121 | June Mar Fajardo (29) | June Mar Fajardo (16) | Chris Ross (9) | Smart Araneta Coliseum | 2–2 |
| 5 | October 18 | Barangay Ginebra | L 92–121 | E.J. Anosike (21) | June Mar Fajardo (18) | CJ Perez (4) | Ynares Center; 10,039 | 2–3 |
| 6 | October 20 | Barangay Ginebra | L 99–102 | E.J. Anosike (30) | June Mar Fajardo (15) | CJ Perez (8) | Smart Araneta Coliseum | 2–4 |

== Commissioner's Cup ==
=== Eliminations ===
==== Standings ====
| Pos | Team | W | L | PCT | GB | Qualification |
|---|---|---|---|---|---|---|
| 1 | NorthPort Batang Pier | 9 | 3 | .750 | — | Twice-to-beat in the quarterfinals |
| 2 | TNT Tropang Giga | 8 | 4 | .667 (Note: Head-to-head quotient: TNT 1.04, Converge 1.03, Barangay Ginebra 0.94) | 1 | Twice-to-beat in the quarterfinals |
| 3 | Converge FiberXers | 8 | 4 | .667 | 1 | Best-of-three quarterfinals |
| 4 | Barangay Ginebra San Miguel | 8 | 4 | .667 | 1 | Best-of-three quarterfinals |
| 5 | Meralco Bolts | 7 | 5 | .583 (Note: Head-to-head quotient: Meralco 1.08, Rain or Shine 1.04, Eastern 0.88) | 2 | Best-of-three quarterfinals |
| 6 | Rain or Shine Elasto Painters | 7 | 5 | .583 | 2 | Best-of-three quarterfinals |
| 7 | Eastern (G) | 7 | 5 | .583 | 2 | Twice-to-win in the quarterfinals |
| 8 | Magnolia Chicken Timplados Hotshots | 6 | 6 | .500 (Note: Eighth seed playoff: Magnolia 112–81 NLEX) | 3 | Twice-to-win in the quarterfinals |
| 9 | NLEX Road Warriors | 6 | 6 | .500 | 3 | |
| 10 | San Miguel Beermen | 5 | 7 | .417 | 4 | |
| 11 | Blackwater Bossing | 3 | 9 | .250 (Note: Head-to-head record: Blackwater 1–0 Phoenix) | 6 | |
| 12 | Phoenix Fuel Masters | 3 | 9 | .250 | 6 | |
| 13 | Terrafirma Dyip | 1 | 11 | .083 | 8 | |

Source: PBA.ph
Rules for classification: 1) winning percentage; 2) if two teams are tied, head-to-head record; if three or more teams are tied, head-to-head goal average (quotient); if tied for 8th, one-game playoff; 3) overall quotient; 4) coin toss
(G) Guests

==== Game log ====
2024–25 PBA Commissioner's Cup game log
Total: 5–7
December: 3–3

| Game | Date | Opponent | Score | High points | High rebounds | High assists | Location Attendance | Record |
|---|---|---|---|---|---|---|---|---|
| 1 | December 3, 2024 | Phoenix | W 107–104 | CJ Perez (18) | June Mar Fajardo (16) | Juami Tiongson (5) | Ninoy Aquino Stadium | 1–0 |
| 2 | December 8, 2024 | NLEX | L 99–104 | Quincy Miller (21) | June Mar Fajardo (19) | Fajardo, Perez (3) | Ynares Center | 1–1 |
| 3 | December 10, 2024 | Rain or Shine | L 93–107 | June Mar Fajardo (20) | Fajardo, Miller (10) | Fajardo, Miller, Ross, Tiongson (3) | Filoil EcoOil Centre | 1–2 |
| 4 | December 13, 2024 | Terrafirma | W 106–88 | Torren Jones (24) | June Mar Fajardo (19) | June Mar Fajardo (7) | Ninoy Aquino Stadium | 2–2 |
| 5 | December 15, 2025 | Blackwater | W 115–102 | Torren Jones (29) | June Mar Fajardo (22) | June Mar Fajardo (6) | Ynares Center | 3–2 |
| 6 | December 22, 2024 | Eastern | L 91–99 (OT) | Jabari Narcis (28) | June Mar Fajardo (18) | Fajardo, Lassiter (5) | PhilSports Arena | 3–3 |

January: 2–4

| Game | Date | Opponent | Score | High points | High rebounds | High assists | Location Attendance | Record |
|---|---|---|---|---|---|---|---|---|
| 7 | January 5, 2025 | Barangay Ginebra | L 81–93 | Jabari Narcis (17) | June Mar Fajardo (23) | Juami Tiongson (5) | Smart Araneta Coliseum | 3–4 |
| 8 | January 12, 2025 | Magnolia | W 85–78 | CJ Perez (23) | Jabari Narcis (23) | CJ Perez (10) | Ynares Center | 4–4 |
| 9 | January 18, 2025 | Meralco | L 93–100 | June Mar Fajardo (20) | June Mar Fajardo (13) | Fajardo, Tautuaa (4) | Candon City Arena | 4–5 |
| 10 | January 21, 2025 | NorthPort | L 104–105 | June Mar Fajardo (24) | June Mar Fajardo (15) | Perez, Tautuaa, Tiongson (4) | Ynares Center | 4–6 |
| 11 | January 24, 2025 | Converge | W 116–113 | Pope, Tiongson (22) | Fajardo, Pope (14) | CJ Perez (9) | Ynares Center | 5–6 |
| 12 | January 26, 2025 | TNT | L 97–115 | June Mar Fajardo (34) | June Mar Fajardo (13) | Chris Ross (6) | Ynares Center | 5–7 |

== Philippine Cup ==
=== Eliminations ===
==== Standings ====
| Pos | Team | W | L | PCT | GB | Qualification |
|---|---|---|---|---|---|---|
| 1 | San Miguel Beermen | 8 | 3 | .727 (Note: Head-to-head quotient: San Miguel 1.06, NLEX 1.01, Magnolia 0.97, Barangay Ginebra 0.96) | — | Twice-to-beat in the quarterfinals |
| 2 | NLEX Road Warriors | 8 | 3 | .727 | — | Twice-to-beat in the quarterfinals |
| 3 | Magnolia Chicken Timplados Hotshots | 8 | 3 | .727 | — | Twice-to-beat in the quarterfinals |
| 4 | Barangay Ginebra San Miguel | 8 | 3 | .727 | — | Twice-to-beat in the quarterfinals |
| 5 | Converge FiberXers | 7 | 4 | .636 | 1 | Twice-to-win in the quarterfinals |
| 6 | TNT Tropang 5G | 6 | 5 | .545 (Note: Head-to-head quotient: TNT 1.13, Rain or Shine 1.02, Meralco 0.87) | 2 | Twice-to-win in the quarterfinals |
| 7 | Rain or Shine Elasto Painters | 6 | 5 | .545 | 2 | Twice-to-win in the quarterfinals |
| 8 | Meralco Bolts | 6 | 5 | .545 | 2 | Twice-to-win in the quarterfinals |
| 9 | Phoenix Fuel Masters | 4 | 7 | .364 | 4 | |
| 10 | Blackwater Bossing | 2 | 9 | .182 (Note: Head-to-head record: Blackwater 1–0 NorthPort) | 6 | |
| 11 | NorthPort Batang Pier | 2 | 9 | .182 | 6 | |
| 12 | Terrafirma Dyip | 1 | 10 | .091 | 7 | |

Source: PBA.ph
Rules for classification: 1) winning percentage; 2) if two teams are tied, head-to-head record; if three or more teams are tied, head-to-head goal average (quotient); if tied for 8th, one-game playoff; 3) overall quotient; 4) coin toss

==== Game log ====
2025 PBA Philippine Cup game log
Total: 8–3
April: 3–1

| Game | Date | Opponent | Score | High points | High rebounds | High assists | Location Attendance | Record |
|---|---|---|---|---|---|---|---|---|
| 1 | April 5 | NLEX | W 98–89 | CJ Perez (28) | June Mar Fajardo (11) | June Mar Fajardo (5) | Ninoy Aquino Stadium | 1–0 |
| 2 | April 9 | Meralco | W 110–98 | CJ Perez (29) | June Mar Fajardo (10) | Fajardo, Perez, Tiongson (4) | Rizal Memorial Coliseum | 2–0 |
| 3 | April 16 | Magnolia | L 95–98 (OT) | Fajardo, Tiongson (17) | June Mar Fajardo (17) | CJ Perez (6) | Smart Araneta Coliseum | 2–1 |
| 4 | April 25 | Barangay Ginebra | W 104–93 | CJ Perez (23) | June Mar Fajardo (12) | Juami Tiongson (7) | Smart Araneta Coliseum | 3–1 |

May: 3–1

| Game | Date | Opponent | Score | High points | High rebounds | High assists | Location Attendance | Record |
|---|---|---|---|---|---|---|---|---|
| 5 | May 4 | TNT | L 84–89 | CJ Perez (26) | June Mar Fajardo (14) | Brondial, Perez (5) | Ynares Center | 3–2 |
| 6 | May 11 | Phoenix | W 111–92 | CJ Perez (26) | June Mar Fajardo (12) | Cruz, Perez (4) | Ninoy Aquino Stadium | 4–2 |
| 7 | May 18 | Terrafirma | W 128–89 | Perez, Tautuaa (17) | Rodney Brondial (22) | Jericho Cruz (5) | Ynares Center II; 8,175 | 5–2 |
| 8 | May 25 | Blackwater | W 115–78 | CJ Perez (20) | June Mar Fajardo (13) | Jericho Cruz (8) | PhilSports Arena | 6–2 |

June: 2–1

| Game | Date | Opponent | Score | High points | High rebounds | High assists | Location Attendance | Record |
|---|---|---|---|---|---|---|---|---|
| 9 | June 7 | Rain or Shine | W 120–111 | CJ Perez (33) | June Mar Fajardo (9) | CJ Perez (7) | Aquilino Q. Pimentel Jr. International Convention Center | 7–2 |
| 10 | June 11 | Converge | L 97–100 | Fajardo, Perez (17) | June Mar Fajardo (23) | June Mar Fajardo (7) | Ninoy Aquino Stadium | 7–3 |
| 11 | June 15 | NorthPort | W 126–91 | CJ Perez (24) | June Mar Fajardo (11) | Cruz, Fajardo, Tautuaa (4) | Ynares Center | 8–3 |

=== Playoffs ===
==== Bracket ====
Quarterfinals (Top 4 twice-to-beat)
1 | San Miguel | 108
8 | Meralco | 97
4 | Barangay Ginebra | 88
5 | Converge | 80
2 | NLEX | 89 | 92
7 | Rain or Shine | 92 | 103
3 | Magnolia | 88 | 79
6 | TNT | 89 | 80

Semifinals (Best-of-7)
1 | San Miguel | 4
4 | Barangay Ginebra | 3
7 | Rain or Shine | 2
6 | TNT | 4

Finals (Best-of-7)
1 | San Miguel | 4
6 | TNT | 2

==== Game log ====
2025 PBA Philippine Cup playoffs game log
Total: 9–5
Quarterfinals: 1–0

| Game | Date | Opponent | Score | High points | High rebounds | High assists | Location Attendance | Series |
|---|---|---|---|---|---|---|---|---|
| 1 | June 20 | Meralco | W 108–97 | June Mar Fajardo (23) | June Mar Fajardo (15) | CJ Perez (9) | Ninoy Aquino Stadium | 1–0 |

Semifinals: 4–3

| Game | Date | Opponent | Score | High points | High rebounds | High assists | Location Attendance | Series |
|---|---|---|---|---|---|---|---|---|
| 1 | June 25 | Barangay Ginebra | L 71–73 | CJ Perez (21) | June Mar Fajardo (19) | Don Trollano (3) | SM Mall of Asia Arena | 0–1 |
| 2 | June 27 | Barangay Ginebra | W 100–83 | Marcio Lassiter (16) | Moala Tautuaa (10) | Rosales, Tiongson (4) | Ninoy Aquino Stadium | 1–1 |
| 3 | June 29 | Barangay Ginebra | L 90–100 | Don Trollano (22) | June Mar Fajardo (14) | Chris Ross (5) | Smart Araneta Coliseum | 1–2 |
| 4 | July 2 | Barangay Ginebra | W 107–82 | CJ Perez (19) | June Mar Fajardo (19) | CJ Perez (7) | SM Mall of Asia Arena | 2–2 |
| 5 | July 4 | Barangay Ginebra | W 103–92 | CJ Perez (31) | June Mar Fajardo (12) | June Mar Fajardo (6) | Smart Araneta Coliseum | 3–2 |
| 6 | July 6 | Barangay Ginebra | L 87–88 | June Mar Fajardo (21) | June Mar Fajardo (16) | June Mar Fajardo (5) | Smart Araneta Coliseum | 3–3 |
| 7 | July 9 | Barangay Ginebra | W 100–93 | June Mar Fajardo (21) | June Mar Fajardo (16) | Cruz, Ross (7) | Smart Araneta Coliseum; 12,279 | 4–3 |

Finals: 4–2

| Game | Date | Opponent | Score | High points | High rebounds | High assists | Location Attendance | Series |
|---|---|---|---|---|---|---|---|---|
| 1 | July 13 | TNT | L 96–99 | June Mar Fajardo (26) | June Mar Fajardo (15) | Chris Ross (4) | Smart Araneta Coliseum | 0–1 |
| 2 | July 16 | TNT | W 98–92 | Don Trollano (22) | Fajardo, Perez (9) | Cruz, Ross (7) | Smart Araneta Coliseum | 1–1 |
| 3 | July 18 | TNT | W 108–88 | June Mar Fajardo (33) | June Mar Fajardo (11) | Cruz, Fajardo (3) | Smart Araneta Coliseum | 2–1 |
| 4 | July 20 | TNT | W 105–91 | Jericho Cruz (23) | June Mar Fajardo (12) | CJ Perez (5) | SM Mall of Asia Arena | 3–1 |
| 5 | July 23 | TNT | L 78–86 | Jericho Cruz (20) | June Mar Fajardo (13) | CJ Perez (5) | Smart Araneta Coliseum | 3–2 |
| 6 | July 25 | TNT | W 107–96 | Fajardo, Perez (24) | June Mar Fajardo (12) | Cruz, Perez (6) | PhilSports Arena | 4–2 |

== East Asia Super League ==
=== Group stage ===
==== Standings ====
| Pos | Team | Pld | W | L | PF | PA | PD | PCT | Qualification |
|---|---|---|---|---|---|---|---|---|---|
| 1 | (Japan) Hiroshima Dragonflies | 6 | 5 | 1 | 517 | 450 | +67 | .833 | Advance to semifinals |
| 2 | (Chinese Taipei) Taoyuan Pauian Pilots | 6 | 4 | 2 | 544 | 459 | +85 | .667 | Advance to semifinals |
| 3 | Hong Kong Eastern | 6 | 3 | 3 | 427 | 450 | −23 | .500 (Note: Hong Kong Eastern 1–0 Suwon KT Sonicboom) | |
| 4 | (South Korea) Suwon KT Sonicboom | 6 | 3 | 3 | 456 | 500 | −44 | .500 | |
| 5 | (Philippines) San Miguel Beermen | 6 | 0 | 6 | 446 | 531 | −85 | .000 | |

Source: EASL

==== Game log ====
| 2 October 2024 | San Miguel Beermen (Philippines) | 81–87 | (South Korea) Suwon KT Sonicboom | Pasay |
| 18:10 (PST) | Scoring by quarter: 20–23, 23–16, 19–29, 19–19 |
| | Pts: Anosike 34; Rebs: Fajardo 9 Asts: Anosike, Ross 4 | Boxscore | Pts: Hammonds 39; Rebs: Hammonds 14; Asts: Heo 9 | Arena: Mall of Asia Arena |

| 13 November 2024 | San Miguel Beermen (Philippines) | 85–101 | (Chinese Taipei) Taoyuan Pauian Pilots | Pasig |
| 18:10 (PST) | Scoring by quarter: 20–25, 13–32, 23–26, 29–18 |
| | Pts: Miller 32; Rebs: Fajardo 11; Asts: Perez 3 | Boxscore | Pts: Brown 27; Rebs: Brown 9 Asts: Graham 7 | Arena: PhilSports Arena |

| 18 December 2024 | Hong Kong Eastern | 71–62 | (Philippines) San Miguel Beermen | Hong Kong |
| 20:10 (HKT) | Scoring by quarter: 28–14, 20–20, 12–14, 11–14 |
| | Pts: Lam 19; Rebs: McLaughlin 17; Asts: McLaughlin 4 | Boxscore | Pts: Jones, Fajardo 19; Rebs: Jones 11; Asts: Ross 4 | Arena: Southorn Stadium |

| 8 January 2025 | Hiroshima Dragonflies (Japan) | 94–63 | (Philippines) San Miguel Beermen | Hiroshima |
| 19:10 (JST) | Scoring by quarter: 30–18, 22–19, 16–14, 26–12 |
| | Pts: Mayo, Mitani 18; Rebs: Blackshear 15; Asts: Blackshear 9 | Boxscore | Pts: Jones 24; Rebs: Jones 13; Asts: Cruz 7 | Arena: Hiroshima Sun Plaza |

| 15 January 2025 | San Miguel Beermen (Philippines) | 74–84 | Hong Kong Eastern | Pasig |
| 20:10 (PST) | Scoring by quarter: 11–30, 21–18, 18–22, 24–14 |
| | Pts: Fajardo, Trollano 20; Rebs: Fajardo 13; Asts: Trollano 5 | Boxscore | Pts: Clark 25; Rebs: McLaughlin 17; Asts: Blankley 6 | Arena: PhilSports Arena |

| 12 February 2025 | Suwon KT Sonicboom (South Korea) | 94–81 | (Philippines) San Miguel Beermen | Suwon |
| 19:10 (KST) | Scoring by quarter: 39–15, 14–26, 22–15, 19–25 |
| | Pts: Hammonds 19; Rebs: Romero 15; Asts: Romero 8 | Boxscore | Pts: Teng 17; Rebs: Brondial 8 Asts: Ross 3 | Arena: Suwon KT Sonicboom Arena; Attendance: 641 |

== Transactions ==
=== Free agency ===
==== Signings ====
| Player | Date signed | Contract amount | Contract length | Former team | Ref. |
|---|---|---|---|---|---|
| Kris Rosales | August 5, 2024 | Not disclosed | Not disclosed | NorthPort Batang Pier | |
| Jericho Cruz | February 7, 2025 | Not disclosed | 2 years | Re-signed | |
| Juami Tiongson | June 5, 2025 | Not disclosed | 3 years | Re-signed | |

==== Subtractions ====
| Player | Number | Position | Reason | New team | Ref. |
|---|---|---|---|---|---|
| Kyt Jimenez | 76 | Point guard / Shooting guard | Released | Zamboanga Valientes (Dubai International Basketball Championship) | |
| Troy Mallillin | 4 | Power forward | Free agent | Blackwater Bossing | |
| Simon Enciso | 0 | Point guard / Shooting guard | Free agent | TNT Tropang 5G | |

=== Trades ===
==== Mid-season ====
November
| November 25, 2024 | To San Miguel Andreas Cahilig; Juami Tiongson | To Terrafirma Vic Manuel; Terrence Romeo |
April
| April 2, 2025 | To San Miguel JM Calma | To NorthPort Avan Nava; 2025 San Miguel second-round pick |

=== Recruited imports ===
| Tournament | Name | Debuted | Last game | Record | Ref. |
|---|---|---|---|---|---|
| Governors' Cup | Jordan Adams | August 21, 2024 (vs. Phoenix) | September 19, 2024 (vs. Rain or Shine) | 5–3 | |
| Governors' Cup | Sheldon Mac | September 11, 2024 (vs. NLEX) | | 1–0 | |
| Governors' Cup | E.J. Anosike | September 26, 2024 (vs. Converge) | October 20, 2024 (vs. Barangay Ginebra) | 5–6 | |
| Commissioner's Cup | Quincy Miller | December 3, 2024 (vs. Phoenix) | December 10, 2024 (vs. Rain or Shine) | 1–2 | |
| Commissioner's Cup | Torren Jones | December 13, 2024 (vs. Terrafirma) | December 15, 2024 (vs. Blackwater) | 2–0 | |
| Commissioner's Cup | Jabari Narcis | December 22, 2024 (vs. Eastern) | January 12, 2025 (vs. Magnolia) | 1–2 | |
| Commissioner's Cup | Malik Pope | January 18, 2025 (vs. Meralco) | January 26, 2025 (vs. TNT) | 1–3 | |

== Awards ==
| Recipient | Award | Date awarded | Reference |
|---|---|---|---|
| June Mar Fajardo | 2024 PBA Governors' Cup Best Player of the Conference | November 3, 2024 | |
| June Mar Fajardo | 2025 PBA Philippine Cup Best Player of the Conference | July 20, 2025 | |
| June Mar Fajardo | 2024–25 PBA Most Valuable Player | October 5, 2025 | |
| Jericho Cruz | 2025 PBA Philippine Cup Finals Most Valuable Player | July 25, 2025 | |
| Don Trollano | 2024–25 PBA Mr. Quality Minutes | October 13, 2025 | |
| Recipient | Honors | Date awarded | Reference |
| CJ Perez | 2024–25 PBA Mythical First Team | October 5, 2025 | |
| June Mar Fajardo | 2024–25 PBA Mythical First Team | October 5, 2025 | |
| June Mar Fajardo | 2024–25 PBA All-Defensive Team | October 5, 2025 | |
