= Kim Aurin =

Filipino basketball player

No. 35 – TNT Tropang 5G
- Position: Shooting guard / small forward
- League: PBA

Personal information
- Born: February 5, 1997 (age 29)
- Listed height: 6 ft 2 in (1.88 m)
- Listed weight: 190 lb (86 kg)

Career information
- College: JRU; Perpetual
- PBA draft: 2023: 3rd round, 34th overall pick
- Drafted by: Barangay Ginebra San Miguel
- Playing career: 2023–present

Career history
- 2023–present: TNT Tropang Giga/5G

Career highlights
- 2× PBA champion (2024 Governors', 2024–25 Commissioner's)

Kim Cyril Jacinto Aurin (born February 5, 1997) is a Filipino professional basketball player for the TNT Tropang 5G of the Philippine Basketball Association (PBA).

== College career ==
Aurin played college basketball for the JRU Heavy Bombers, then for the Perpetual Altas. Aurin supposedly violated unspecified team protocols while with Perpetual, leading to an indefinite suspension on the team during NCAA Season 98 (2022). Aurin eventually left the team, and eventually was included in the line-up of Barangay Ginebra San Miguel 3x3. Aurin led Ginebra to its first leg title.

== Professional career ==
Ginebra then drafted Aurin 34th overall in the 2023 PBA draft for their 5-on-5 team. However, Ginebra did not sign him, and he became a free agent. TNT Tropang Giga then signed Aurin and debuted for them. On January 31, 2025, the Tropang Giga announced a new contract extension with Aurin, securing his place on the team.

== PBA career statistics ==
Legend
GP	Games played	MPG	Minutes per game	FG%	Field-goal percentage
3FG%	3-point field-goal percentage	4P%	4-point field-goal percentage	FT%	Free-throw percentage
RPG	Rebounds per game	APG	Assists per game	SPG	Steals per game
BPG	Blocks per game	PPG	Points per game	127	Career high

As of the end of 2024–25 season

=== Season-by-season averages ===
Year	Team	GP	MPG	FG%	3P%	4P%	FT%	RPG	APG	SPG	BPG	PPG
2023–24	TNT	24	15.6	.500	.508	—	.625	1.7	.9	.4	.2	7.2
2024–25	TNT	71	18.6	.373	.287	.000	.681	1.6	1.0	.3	.2	4.6
Career		95	17.8	.407	.349	.000	.658	1.6	.9	.4	.2	5.2
