= Rey Nambatac =

Filipino basketball player

No. 6 – TNT Tropang 5G
- Position: Point guard / shooting guard / assistant coach
- League: PBA

Personal information
- Born: January 27, 1994 (age 32) Cagayan de Oro, Philippines
- Listed height: 5 ft 11 in (1.80 m)

Career information
- High school: Letran (Manila)
- College: Letran
- PBA draft: 2017: 1st round, 7th overall pick
- Drafted by: Rain or Shine Elasto Painters
- Playing career: 2017–present

Career history

Playing
- 2017–2024: Rain or Shine Elasto Painters
- 2024: Blackwater Bossing
- 2024–present: TNT Tropang Giga/5G

Coaching
- 2024–2025: Letran Knights (assistant)

Career highlights
- 2× PBA champion (2024 Governors', 2024–25 Commissioner's); PBA Finals MVP (2024–25 Commissioner's); PBA All-Star (2026); NCAA Philippines champion (2015)
Medals
Men's basketball
Representing Philippines
SEABA Under-18 Championship
Gold medal – first place	2012 Singapore	Team

Rey Benedict Chan Nambatac (born January 27, 1994) is a Filipino professional basketball player for the TNT Tropang 5G of the Philippine Basketball Association (PBA). He's also the current assistant coach of his alma mater, the Letran Knights. He played for the Letran in the NCAA during his college days. He was selected seventh overall pick in the 2017 PBA draft by Rain or Shine Elasto Painters.

== Professional career ==
In his PBA debut back on December 22, 2017, Nambatac recorded 5 points and 5 rebounds in almost 13 minutes of playing time on an 82–79 win over the TNT Katropa.

On November 3, 2021, Nambatac signed a new three-year maximum contract with the Elasto Painters. On June 27, 2023, one year before his contract expires, Nambatac signed a two-year contract extension with the team that would take effect in 2024.

On February 14, 2024, he was traded to the Blackwater Bossing for two future draft picks.

On July 2, 2024, he was traded to the TNT Tropang Giga for Kib Montalbo, Jewel Ponferada, and a future draft pick.

== PBA career statistics ==
Legend
GP	Games played	MPG	Minutes per game	FG%	Field-goal percentage
3FG%	3-point field-goal percentage	4P%	4-point field-goal percentage	FT%	Free-throw percentage
RPG	Rebounds per game	APG	Assists per game	SPG	Steals per game
BPG	Blocks per game	PPG	Points per game	127	Career high

As of the end of 2024–25 season

=== Season-by-season averages ===
Year	Team	GP	MPG	FG%	3P%	4P%	FT%	RPG	APG	SPG	BPG	PPG
2017–18	Rain or Shine	34	15.1	.376	.403	—	.600	2.6	1.3	.6	.1	5.0
2019	Rain or Shine	47	24.6	.445	.402	—	.701	3.9	2.1	.9	.1	10.5
2020	Rain or Shine	12	24.9	.312	.250	—	.729	2.9	3.2	1.3	.2	8.7
2021	Rain or Shine	22	30.7	.360	.302	—	.769	3.8	2.5	.9	.0	13.5
2022–23	Rain or Shine	34	28.3	.387	.307	—	.755	4.0	3.4	.9	.1	13.3
2023–24	Rain or Shine	23	20.8	.385	.243	—	.864	2.7	3.3	.6	—	10.0
2023–24	Blackwater	23	20.8	.385	.243	—	.864	2.7	3.3	.6	—	10.0
2024–25	TNT	54	26.6	.421	.382	.238	.763	4.0	3.2	.9	.0	11.9
Career		226	24.4	.399	.347	.238	.751	3.6	2.6	.9	.0	10.6
