= Paul Varilla =

Filipino basketball player (born 1993)

No. 9 – TNT Tropang 5G
- Position: Small forward
- League: PBA

Personal information
- Born: August 10, 1993 (age 33)
- Listed height: 6 ft 3 in (1.91 m)
- Listed weight: 185 lb (84 kg)

Career information
- College: UE
- PBA draft: 2018: 2nd round, 13th overall pick
- Drafted by: Rain or Shine Elasto Painters
- Playing career: 2018–present

Career history
- 2018: Batangas City Athletics
- 2019–2022: NLEX Road Warriors
- 2023–present: TNT Tropang Giga/5G

Career highlights
- 3× PBA champion (2023 Governors', 2024 Governors', 2024–25 Commissioner's); MPBL champion (2018)

Paul Varilla (born August 10, 1993) is a Filipino-American professional basketball player for the TNT Tropang 5G of the Philippine Basketball Association (PBA).

== College career ==
Varilla played his college career with the UE Red Warriors.

== Amateur career ==
In 2017, Varilla was part of the Tanduay Light Rhum Masters of the PBA D-League during the 2017 Foundation Cup. In 2018, he joined another Tanduay-backed team in the Batangas City Athletics of the Maharlika Pilipinas Basketball League, where he won a championship with the team.

== Professional career ==
=== NLEX Road Warriors (2019–2022) ===
Varilla was selected 13th overall by the Rain or Shine Elasto Painters during the 2018 PBA draft, but did not suit up for the team. He would instead end up with the NLEX Road Warriors.

=== TNT Tropang Giga / TNT Tropang 5G (2023–present) ===
On January 18, 2023, Varilla was part of a three-team trade between NLEX, the Phoenix Super LPG Fuel Masters, and TNT Tropang Giga that sent him and teammate Justin Chua to TNT. On March 15, 2023, he signed a two-year deal with TNT. In his first conference with TNT, Varilla won his first professional championship after the Tropang Giga won the 2023 Governors' Cup finals.

== Career statistics ==
=== PBA ===
Legend
GP	Games played	MPG	Minutes per game	FG%	Field-goal percentage
3FG%	3-point field-goal percentage	4P%	4-point field-goal percentage	FT%	Free-throw percentage
RPG	Rebounds per game	APG	Assists per game	SPG	Steals per game
BPG	Blocks per game	PPG	Points per game	**127**	Career high

As of the end of 2024–25 season

==== Season-by-season averages ====
Year	Team	GP	MPG	FG%	3P%	4P%	FT%	RPG	APG	SPG	BPG	PPG
2019	NLEX	19	10.7	.455	**.524**	—	.800	1.3	.4	**.3**	.1	**2.4**
2020	NLEX	9	12.1	.231	.273	—	**1.000**	.9	**1.0**	**.3**	—	1.2
2021	NLEX	11	10.5	**.533**	.500	—	.333	1.2	.5	.2	—	1.8
2022–23	NLEX	**39**	**15.5**	.310	.156	—	.448	**2.0**	.7	.2	**.2**	1.9
2022–23	TNT	**39**	**15.5**	.310	.156	—	.448	**2.0**	.7	.2	**.2**	1.9
2023–24	TNT	8	3.9	.429	.000	—	.000	1.0	.1	—	—	.8
2024–25	TNT	33	6.9	.353	.400	—	—	1.2	.4	.2	.0	.4
Career		119	10.8	.360	.289	—	.488	1.4	.6	.2	.1	1.4

=== MPBL ===
Legend
GP	Games played	GS	Games started	MPG	Minutes per game
FG%	Field-goal percentage	3P%	3-point field-goal percentage	FT%	Free-throw percentage
RPG	Rebounds per game	APG	Assists per game	SPG	Steals per game
BPG	Blocks per game	PPG	Points per game	**Bold**	Career high

As of the 2018–19 season, December 6, 2018

==== Season-by-season averages ====
Year	Team	GP	GS	MPG	FG%	3P%	FT%	RPG	APG	SPG	BPG	PPG
2018	Batangas City	17	17	24.4	.417	.087	.691	5.2	1.4	1.1	.6	7.4
2018–19	Batangas City	17	15	23.8	.369	.300	.581	5.7	1.7	.5	.5	7.0
