= Brandon Ganuelas-Rosser =

Filipino-American basketball player

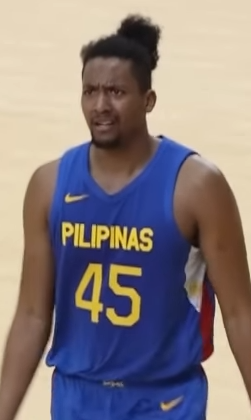
- Ganuelas-Rosser in 2023

No. 45 – TNT Tropang 5G
- Position: Center / power forward
- League: PBA

Personal information
- Born: June 29, 1994 (age 32) San Diego, California, U.S.
- Listed height: 6 ft 6 in (1.98 m)
- Listed weight: 220 lb (100 kg)

Career information
- High school: Temecula Valley (Temecula, California)
- College: Central Arizona (2013–2015); UC Riverside (2016–2018)
- PBA draft: 2022: 1st round, 1st overall pick
- Drafted by: Blackwater Bossing
- Playing career: 2019–present

Career history
- 2019–2020: San Miguel Alab Pilipinas
- 2022: Blackwater Bossing
- 2022–2023: NLEX Road Warriors
- 2024–present: TNT Tropang Giga/5G

Career highlights
- PBA Comeback Player of the Year (2025); PBA All-Rookie Team (2023); PBA 3x3 champion (2021 First conference)
Medals
Men's basketball
Representing Philippines
SEA Games
Gold medal – first place	2023 Phnom Penh	Team
Men's 3x3 basketball
Representing Philippines
SEA Games
Bronze medal – third place	2021 Hanoi	Team

Brandon Arnell Ganuelas-Rosser (born June 29, 1994) is a Filipino-American basketball player for the TNT Tropang 5G of the Philippine Basketball Association (PBA).

== Professional career ==
Ganuelas-Rosser was drafted first overall in the 2022 PBA draft.

On September 19, 2022, Ganuelas-Rosser was traded to the NLEX Road Warriors in a three-team trade involving NLEX, Blackwater, and TNT Tropang Giga.

On February 26, 2024, Ganuelas-Rosser was traded to the TNT Tropang Giga in a three-team trade involving TNT, NLEX, and Blackwater.

== PBA career statistics ==
Legend
GP	Games played	MPG	Minutes per game	FG%	Field-goal percentage
3FG%	3-point field-goal percentage	4P%	4-point field-goal percentage	FT%	Free-throw percentage
RPG	Rebounds per game	APG	Assists per game	SPG	Steals per game
BPG	Blocks per game	PPG	Points per game	127	Career high

As of the end of 2024–25 season

=== Season-by-season averages ===
Year	Team	GP	MPG	FG%	3P%	4P%	FT%	RPG	APG	SPG	BPG	PPG
2022–23	Blackwater	32	27.0	.498	.274	—	.643	5.7	1.0	.7	1.5	12.6
2022–23	NLEX	32	27.0	.498	.274	—	.643	5.7	1.0	.7	1.5	12.6
2023–24	NLEX	18	21.4	.447	.214	—	.468	4.8	.8	.3	1.4	7.1
2023–24	TNT	18	21.4	.447	.214	—	.468	4.8	.8	.3	1.4	7.1
2024–25	TNT	17	24.1	.586	.360	—	.593	5.6	1.1	.4	1.9	10.6
Career		67	24.7	.508	.277	—	.594	5.4	1.0	.5	1.6	10.6

== 3x3 career ==
Rosser played for the Limitless Appmasters of the PBA 3x3.

== Personal life ==
Ganuelas-Rosser was born to James Rosser, a retired US Navy, and Gina Ganuelas. He has an older brother, Matt, who also plays in the PBA.
