= Glenn Khobuntin =

Filipino basketball player

No. 12 – TNT Tropang 5G
- Position: Small forward / power forward
- League: PBA

Personal information
- Born: September 7, 1991 (age 35) Cagayan de Oro, Philippines
- Listed height: 6 ft 4 in (1.93 m)
- Listed weight: 192 lb (87 kg)

Career information
- High school: Letran (Manila)
- College: NU
- PBA draft: 2015: 1st round, 10th overall pick
- Drafted by: NLEX Road Warriors
- Playing career: 2015–present

Career history
- 2015–2017: NLEX Road Warriors
- 2017–2020: Terrafirma Dyip
- 2021–present: TNT Tropang Giga/5G

Career highlights
- 4× PBA champion (2021 Philippine, 2023 Governors', 2024 Governors', 2024–25 Commissioner's); PBA All-Star (2017); PBA All-Defensive Team (2025); UAAP champion (2014)

Glenn R. Khobuntin (born September 7, 1991) is a Filipino professional basketball player for the TNT Tropang 5G of the Philippine Basketball Association (PBA).

== High school career ==
Khobuntin, a Cagayan de Oro native, studied high school at the Colegio de San Juan de Letran, where he was a star player for their junior varsity squad, the Letran Squires. During his high school years at Letran, he was invited to the Nike Elite Camp in 2009 along with other high school standouts and future PBA draft batchmates Baser Amer, Keith Agovida, Nico Elorde, Aljon Mariano, Troy Rosario, and Mark Cruz.

== College career ==
Khobuntin was immediately recruited by NU Bulldogs coach Eric Altamirano after he finished high school. The offer to play for National University was the first and only scholarship offer he received as he did not entertain offers other schools. He first suited up for the Bulldogs in 2010. In his last game with NU, he posted 10 points in helping the school win its first championship after 60 years.

=== College averages ===
Season	Team	G	MPG	FG%	3P%	FT%	RPG	APG	SPG	BPG	PPG
2011	NU	12	18.3	.397	.000	.375	3.8	.8	.4	.0	4.1
2012	NU	9	8.4	.375	.000	.375	2.0	.6	.0	.0	1.7
2013	NU	16	13.3	.483	.000	.588	2.6	.8	.1	.1	4.1
2014	NU	20	28.8	.371	.115	.565	6.8	1.4	.2	.1	9.4

== Amateur career ==
While in the amateur ranks, Khobuntin suited up for several PBA D-League teams - Boracay Rum, BDO-NU Bulldogs, FEU-MJM Builders, and Jumbo Plastic.

== Professional career ==
Khobuntin was drafted tenth overall by the NLEX Road Warriors in the 2015 PBA draft.

== PBA career statistics ==
Legend
GP	Games played	MPG	Minutes per game	FG%	Field-goal percentage
3FG%	3-point field-goal percentage	4P%	4-point field-goal percentage	FT%	Free-throw percentage
RPG	Rebounds per game	APG	Assists per game	SPG	Steals per game
BPG	Blocks per game	PPG	Points per game	127	Career high

As of the end of 2024–25 season

=== Season-by-season averages ===
Year	Team	GP	MPG	FG%	3P%	4P%	FT%	RPG	APG	SPG	BPG	PPG
2015–16	NLEX	34	13.5	.404	.188	—	.613	1.6	.4	.1	.1	4.0
2016–17	NLEX	31	18.8	.371	.241	—	.554	3.0	1.1	.2	.2	6.4
2016–17	Mahindra / Kia	31	18.8	.371	.241	—	.554	3.0	1.1	.2	.2	6.4
2017–18	Kia / Columbian	31	19.3	.367	.233	—	.469	2.2	1.3	.2	.1	6.3
2019	Columbian	29	23.5	.436	.369	—	.649	2.3	.8	.5	.1	7.3
2020	Terrafirma	10	19.9	.373	.318	—	.692	2.4	.7	.1	.1	7.8
2021	TNT	32	13.1	.432	.360	—	.743	2.2	.3	.2	.0	4.8
2022–23	TNT	51	21.2	.409	.315	—	.673	4.0	.7	.2	.1	6.5
2023–24	TNT	26	28.3	.365	.311	—	.705	4.1	1.1	.3	.3	8.1
2024–25	TNT	75	21.6	.433	.323	.000	.565	3.3	.9	.3	.1	5.7
Career		319	20.0	.403	.305	.000	.621	2.9	.8	.2	.1	6.1

== International career ==
Khobuntin saw action in the 2015 Southeast Asian Games and 2015 SEABA Championship, where the Gilas Cadets team won gold medals on both occasions.

== Personal life ==
Khobuntin was born to parents Dante and Jocelyn Khobuntin.
