= Henry Galinato =

Filipino-American basketball player (born 1997)

No. 32 – TNT Tropang 5G
- Position: Center / power forward
- League: PBA

Personal information
- Born: September 9, 1997 (age 29) Delano, California, U.S.
- Listed height: 6 ft 6 in (1.98 m)
- Listed weight: 245 lb (111 kg)

Career information
- High school: Cesar E. Chavez (Delano, California)
- College: Bakersfield; Benedictine; UP
- PBA draft: 2023: 2nd round, 15th overall pick
- Drafted by: Rain or Shine Elasto Painters
- Playing career: 2023–present

Career history
- 2023-present: TNT Tropang Giga/5G

Career highlights
- 2× PBA champion (2024 Governors', 2024–25 Commissioner's)

Henry Galinato Jr. (born September 9, 1997) is a Filipino-American professional basketball player for the TNT Tropang 5G of the Philippine Basketball Association (PBA). He was born in Delano, California.

In high school, Galinato played for Cesar E. Chavez High School in Delano, California. In 2016, he began his college career at Bakersfield College before moving to Benedictine University in Mesa, Arizona in 2018, playing for the Redhawks. In 2021, he committed to playing for the UP Fighting Maroons.

== Professional career ==
=== TNT Tropang Giga/5G (2023–present) ===
On September 17, 2023, during the PBA season 48 draft, Galinato was selected 15th overall by the Rain or Shine Elasto Painters. Four days later on September 21, Rain or Shine traded him alongside Jewel Ponferada to the TNT Tropang Giga for Dave Marcelo and TNT's season 50 first-round pick. On September 23, Galinato signed a two-year deal with TNT.

On March 9, 2024, he scored career-high 17 points and 11 rebounds in a 100–97 win over Terrafirma Dyip where he was named Best Player of the Game.

== PBA career statistics ==
Legend
GP	Games played	MPG	Minutes per game	FG%	Field-goal percentage
3FG%	3-point field-goal percentage	4P%	4-point field-goal percentage	FT%	Free-throw percentage
RPG	Rebounds per game	APG	Assists per game	SPG	Steals per game
BPG	Blocks per game	PPG	Points per game	127	Career high

As of the end of 2024–25 season

=== Season-by-season averages ===
Year	Team	GP	MPG	FG%	3P%	4P%	FT%	RPG	APG	SPG	BPG	PPG
2023–24	TNT	24	12.6	.506	.333	—	.581	4.9	.5	.1	.2	4.3
2024–25	TNT	35	8.4	.494	.000	—	.429	2.9	.5	.2	.3	2.9
Career		59	10.1	.500	.200	—	.508	3.7	.5	.2	.2	3.4
