= Jewel Ponferada =

Filipino basketball player

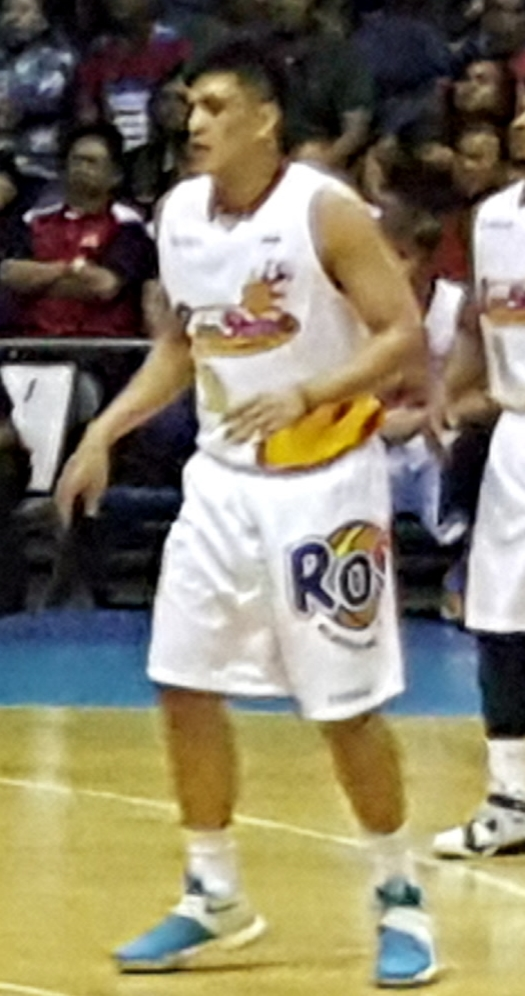

Free agent
- Position: Power forward / center

Personal information
- Born: July 8, 1988 (age 38) Borongan, Eastern Samar, Philippines
- Listed height: 6 ft 5 in (1.96 m)
- Listed weight: 215 lb (98 kg)

Career information
- College: NU
- PBA draft: 2012: 2nd round, 13th overall pick
- Drafted by: San Mig Coffee Mixers
- Playing career: 2012–present

Career history
- 2012–2013: San Mig Coffee Mixers
- 2013–2015: GlobalPort Batang Pier
- 2015–2023: Rain or Shine Elasto Painters
- 2023–2024: TNT Tropang Giga
- 2024–2025: Blackwater Bossing

Career highlights
- 2× PBA champion (2013 Governors', 2016 Commissioner's)

Jewel Ponferada (born July 8, 1988) is a Filipino professional basketball player who last played for the Blackwater Bossing of the Philippine Basketball Association (PBA). He was selected 13th overall in the 2012 PBA draft by the San Mig Coffee Mixers.

== College career ==
Ponferada played for the NU Bulldogs. He mostly played center during his stay there, but also played power forward. In 2010, he made a game-winning triple with 2.9 seconds left to prevent the Adamson Falcons from immediately claiming a spot in the Final Four.

== Professional career ==
=== San Mig Coffee Mixers (2012–2013) ===
Ponferada was drafted by the Mixers along with big men Aldrech Ramos and Gian Chiu. He was able to win a championship during his time there in the 2013 Governors' Cup. Before the following conference, he was traded to Globalport.

=== Globalport Batang Pier (2013–2015) ===
The Globalport Batang Pier acquired Ponferada with a 2017 second-round pick.

=== Rain or Shine Elasto Painters (2015–2023) ===
On August 16, 2015, Ponferada and a 2015 second-round pick (who later turned out to be Simon Enciso) was traded by the Batang Pier to the Rain or Shine Elasto Painters in exchange for Jervy Cruz. In the 2015–16 Philippine Cup, Ponferada registered career-highs of 18 points and 13 rebounds. In the Commissioner's Cup, he won a championship with Rain or Shine. During the Governor's Cup, he was suspended for one game for committing two flagrant fouls against the Mahindra Enforcers.

In the 2016–17 Philippine Cup, he posted a new career-high of 22 points, while also grabbing 9 rebounds. The following Philippine Cup, he made five of his seven attempts from three-point range to finish with 17 points, 3 rebounds, and a block in a win against the San Miguel Beermen.

Before the 2021 Philippine Cup, Ponferada's contract was extended. He scored 17 points to lead the team in a loss to the Northport Batang Pier.

On May 19, 2022, Ponferada signed a two-year extension with the team. He had a season-high 20 points in a loss to the Beermen.

=== TNT Tropang Giga (2023–2024) ===
On September 21, 2023, Ponferada, along with Henry Galinato, was traded to the TNT Tropang Giga for Dave Marcelo and a 2024 first-round pick.

=== Blackwater Bossing (2024–2025) ===
On July 2, 2024, Ponferrada and Kib Montalbo was traded to Blackwater Bossing for Rey Nambatac.

== PBA career statistics ==
Legend
GP	Games played	MPG	Minutes per game	FG%	Field-goal percentage
3FG%	3-point field-goal percentage	4P%	4-point field-goal percentage	FT%	Free-throw percentage
RPG	Rebounds per game	APG	Assists per game	SPG	Steals per game
BPG	Blocks per game	PPG	Points per game	127	Career high

As of the end of 2024–25 season

=== Season-by-season averages ===
Year	Team	GP	MPG	FG%	3P%	4P%	FT%	RPG	APG	SPG	BPG	PPG
2012–13	San Mig Coffee	14	3.9	.538	—	—	.000	.9	.1	—	.1	1.1
2013–14	GlobalPort	20	10.7	.549	—	—	.571	2.9	.4	.2	.3	3.4
2014–15	GlobalPort	28	13.9	.333	—	—	.520	3.8	.3	.1	.4	2.3
2015–16	Rain or Shine	53	16.7	.500	.385	—	.758	3.6	.8	.3	.5	6.4
2016–17	Rain or Shine	37	13.7	.448	.296	—	.623	3.2	.5	.2	.7	4.8
2017–18	Rain or Shine	39	14.0	.472	.297	—	.741	3.4	.7	.3	.4	5.9
2019	Rain or Shine	48	13.4	.387	.300	—	.589	2.7	.6	.3	.4	4.5
2020	Rain or Shine	12	14.3	.451	.083	—	.654	3.2	.8	.3	.5	5.3
2021	Rain or Shine	22	11.8	.368	.400	—	.649	2.3	.7	.2	.6	4.6
2022–23	Rain or Shine	31	11.5	.407	.244	—	.533	2.3	.8	.2	.2	4.1
2023–24	TNT	26	9.4	.623	.471	—	.647	2.0	.6	.2	.5	3.3
2024–25	Blackwater	20	13.7	.404	.360	.500	.857	1.8	1.1	.1	.2	2.8
Career		351	13.0	.447	.316	.500	.649	2.8	.6	.2	.4	4.4
