= Dave Marcelo =

Filipino basketball player (born 1989)

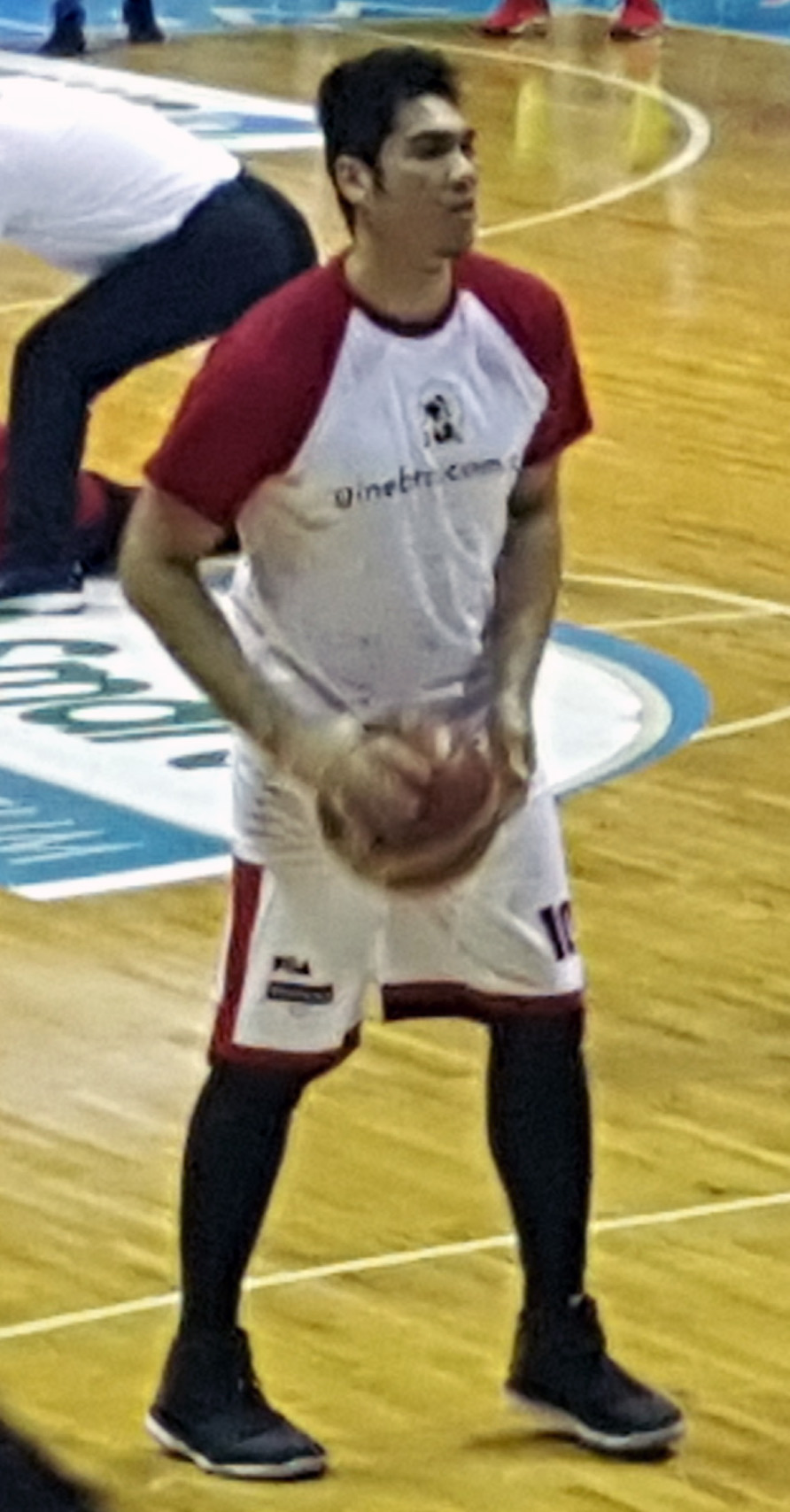
- Marcelo with the Barangay Ginebra San Miguel in 2017

Free agent
- Position: Center

Personal information
- Born: February 22, 1989 (age 37)
- Listed height: 6 ft 5 in (1.96 m)
- Listed weight: 223 lb (101 kg)

Career information
- High school: San Beda (Manila)
- College: San Beda
- PBA draft: 2012: 2nd round, 12th overall pick
- Drafted by: B-Meg Llamados
- Playing career: 2012–present

Career history
- 2012–2015: Barako Bull Energy Cola / Barako Bull Energy
- 2015–2017: Barangay Ginebra San Miguel
- 2017–2018: Blackwater Elite
- 2018: NLEX Road Warriors
- 2019–2020: Phoenix Super LPG Fuel Masters
- 2021–2023: TNT Tropang Giga
- 2023–2026: NLEX Road Warriors

Career highlights
- 3× PBA champion (2016 Governors', 2021 Philippine, 2023 Governors'); PBA All-Star Week Obstacle Challenge champion (2023); 4× NCAA Philippines champion (2007, 2008, 2010, 2011); NCAA Philippines Finals MVP (2011); NCAA Philippines Rookie of the Year (2007)

David Paul M. Marcelo (born February 22, 1989) is a Filipino professional basketball player who last played for the NLEX Road Warriors of the Philippine Basketball Association (PBA). Marcelo was drafted by B-Meg in the 2012 PBA draft as the 12th overall pick.

== College career ==
Marcelo studied and played for the San Beda Red Lions from 2007 from 2011 together graduated with Garvo Lanete and Mar Villahermosa. The Red Lions won 4 out of 5 championships with them. He was well known for his inside scoring and rebounding.

On his last year with the Red Lions, they faced the JRU Heavy Bombers in the semifinals after beating San Sebastian Stags in the top-seed playoff. They won over the Heavy Bombers, 83–74, to advance to the Finals then the Stags won over the Letran Knights in the second game of their semifinals, 63–56. The Part III of the Red Lions–Stags rivalry started when the Red Lions won 75–63 in Game One. In Game Two of the Finals, there was a hard-fought battle when they outscored the Stags in the low-scoring fourth quarter, 9–5, as Pascual missed a three-point field goal that could have won over the Red Lions as the Red Lions won, 57–55, to get their 16th championship, tying Letran.

== Amateur career ==
Marcelo played for the NLEX Road Warriors in the PBA Developmental League also together with Lanete. In his last conference with the Road Warriors, they completed a 13–0 sweep at the end of the conference.

== Professional career ==
=== Barako Bull Energy (2012–2015) ===
Marcelo declared himself for the 2012 PBA draft. There, he was drafted 12th overall by the Barako Bull Energy Cola.

=== Barangay Ginebra San Miguel (2015–2017) ===
In April 2015, Marcelo was traded to Barangay Ginebra San Miguel in exchange for Billy Mamaril who was later dealt to San Miguel Beermen in exchange for Rico Maierhofer in a complex 4-team 6-players blockbuster trade that involved GlobalPort Batang Pier, where he was reunited with his former college coach at San Beda, Frankie Lim.

=== TNT Tropang Giga (2021–2023) ===
On May 16, 2023, Marcelo signed a one-year contract extension with the team.

=== NLEX Road Warriors (2023–2026) ===
On September 21, 2023, Marcelo, along with a 2024 first-round pick, was traded to the Rain or Shine Elasto Painters for Henry Galinato and Jewel Ponferada. He was subsequently waived by the Elasto Painters. In October 2023, he signed with the NLEX Road Warriors, reuniting him with his former college coach Frankie Lim. This is also Marcelo's second stint with the Road Warriors.

On January 3, 2024, he signed a new one-year contract with the team.

== PBA career statistics ==
Legend
GP	Games played	MPG	Minutes per game	FG%	Field-goal percentage
3FG%	3-point field-goal percentage	4P%	4-point field-goal percentage	FT%	Free-throw percentage
RPG	Rebounds per game	APG	Assists per game	SPG	Steals per game
BPG	Blocks per game	PPG	Points per game	127	Career high

As of the end of 2024–25 season

=== Season-by-season averages ===
Year	Team	GP	MPG	FG%	3P%	4P%	FT%	RPG	APG	SPG	BPG	PPG
2012–13	Barako Bull	15	9.6	.500	—	—	.455	2.8	.4	.3	.5	2.5
2013–14	Barako Bull	27	10.7	.460	1.000	—	.400	2.7	.4	.3	.5	1.9
2014–15	Barako Bull	36	19.0	.433	—	—	.661	3.6	.6	.6	.6	4.8
2014–15	Barangay Ginebra	36	19.0	.433	—	—	.661	3.6	.6	.6	.6	4.8
2015–16	Barangay Ginebra	44	9.8	.447	.000	—	.541	1.8	.4	.3	.3	2.4
2016–17	Barangay Ginebra	49	11.5	.457	.000	—	.600	2.5	.5	.3	.6	3.4
2016–17	Blackwater	49	11.5	.457	.000	—	.600	2.5	.5	.3	.6	3.4
2017–18	Blackwater	30	9.9	.382	.364	—	.440	1.9	.4	.3	.4	2.4
2017–18	NLEX	30	9.9	.382	.364	—	.440	1.9	.4	.3	.4	2.4
2019	Phoenix Pulse	37	10.9	.484	.308	—	.590	2.1	.4	.5	.5	3.2
2020	Phoenix Super LPG	15	7.5	.400	.222	—	.636	1.8	.6	.4	.9	1.7
2021	TNT	30	10.5	.479	.200	—	.639	2.7	.2	.4	.4	3.2
2022–23	TNT	43	6.5	.463	.273	—	.476	1.4	.3	.3	.2	1.2
2023–24	NLEX	16	13.1	.441	—	—	.483	3.3	1.2	.3	.5	2.8
2024–25	NLEX	12	7.3	.364	.000	—	.571	1.9	.4	.5	.6	1.0
Career		354	10.8	.449	.280	—	.569	2.3	.5	.4	.5	2.7
