= Kib Montalbo =

Filipino basketball player (born 1996)

No. 15 – Blackwater Bossing
- Position: Point guard / shooting guard
- League: PBA

Personal information
- Born: April 2, 1996 (age 30) Bacolod, Philippines
- Listed height: 6 ft 0 in (1.83 m)
- Listed weight: 155 lb (70 kg)

Career information
- High school: Bacolod Tay Tung High School (Bacolod); St. John's Institute Bacolod (Bacolod)
- College: De La Salle
- PBA draft: 2019: 1st round, 11th overall pick
- Drafted by: TNT KaTropa
- Playing career: 2019–present

Career history
- 2019: Makati Super Crunch
- 2020–2024: TNT Tropang Giga
- 2024–present: Blackwater Bossing

Career highlights
- 2× PBA champion (2021 Philippine, 2023 Governors'); 2× UAAP champion (2013, 2016)

Kirell Brahndon Paco Montalbo (born April 2, 1996) is a Filipino professional basketball player for the Blackwater Bossing of the Philippine Basketball Association (PBA).

== High school career ==
Montalbo's first sports were billiards and swimming. He then tried out basketball after playing in his school's intramurals. He first played for Bacolod Tay Tung High School in the Negros Occidental Private Schools Sports Cultural Educational Association (NOPSSCEA), where his father was an assistant coach. In 2009, he led his school to the NOPSSCEA finals where he scored 37 points but lost to St. John's Institute (SJI). He then transferred to SJI, where in his first year, he scored 45 points in the NOPSSCEA finals, but lost to the West Negros University Junior Mustangs. In his final year with SJI, they dethroned the defending champion Junior Mustangs in the semifinals then went on to sweep the University of Negros Occidental – Recoletos Junior Rams in the best-of-three finals.

In 2009, Montalbo was part of a Western Visayas selection that won the silver medal in that year's Palarong Pambansa. His team was defeated by a National Capital Region (NCR) team led by future PBA player Renzo Subido. He was also a part of the 2010 Jr. NBA All Star–Philippines team that saw action in China. In 2011, he played in the Seaoil Elite League, a basketball program held by the National Basketball Training Center (NBTC) for high schoolers. He helped his team get to the finals where they lost to a selection from Cebu.

Montalbo was recruited by De La Salle University and Ateneo de Manila University. He was seen as the second-best recruit in the country behind Jerie Pingoy. The entire DLSU coaching staff, star player Jeron Teng and even chief Archers patron Eduardo ‘Danding’ Cojuangco made a trip to his hometown of Bacolod just to recruit him. On January 4, 2013, he committed to DLSU. He chose them as many of his family members, including his parents, are alumni of that university.

== College career ==
Coming into DLSU, Montalbo was seen as their next big recruit since Jeron Teng. To start his rookie season however, he was often on the bench behind LA Revilla and Thomas Torres. He started getting minutes after Torres was out with an illness. That season, the De La Salle Green Archers won the championship over the UST Growling Tigers.

In 2014, Montalbo and Subido participated in the Nike All-Asia Basketball Camp, where they both made the Top 20 Asian Players list. In Season 77, he stepped up once again as Torres was out with another injury, and took the starting role. In a win over the Adamson Soaring Falcons, he had a college career-high 18 points. In a win over the Tigers, he pulled a calf muscle, which took him out of the rotation for a week. That season, the Archers made the Final Four, but were defeated by the FEU Tamaraws.

In 2015, during a Filoil Flying V Preseason Cup match against the UE Red Warriors, Montalbo suffered an ACL injury. Without him, the Archers didn't make the Final Four in Season 78. He used the time away from basketball to recover and focus on his studies, making the dean's list for his course in business management. He made his return to the team during the 2016 Filoil Cup. In a Season 79 win over Adamson, he 12 points, eight rebounds, six assists, and three steals. That performance led to him earning a Player of the Week award, becoming the third Archer that season to win one after Ben Mbala and Teng. Later in the tournament, he hit a clutch triple against Adamson that gave La Salle their eighth straight win. Their win streak ended at 12 games with a loss to their archrivals the Ateneo Blue Eagles. In their last game of the elimination round, he scored 13 points in a win over FEU, and the Archers finished first in the standings with a record of 13–1. He finished the elimination rounds third in minutes per game on the team. They went on to sweep Ateneo in the finals. That season, he led the league with career-highs of 2.8 steals and 2.8 assists. This was his second UAAP championship. He was awarded the Pivotal Player Award during the 2017 Collegiate Basketball Awards.

In the preseason, Montalbo was involved in a bench-clearing brawl against FEU. Despite being punched in the face by a FEU player, he had no injuries. For Season 80, he was made team captain. They got their first win of the season against FEU, in which he made three straight threes, and finished with 12 points, four rebounds, three assists, and two steals. He was able to contribute that game despite coming off a viral infection that had him hospitalized. In a loss to Ateneo, he committed a costly turnover in the last nine seconds of the game that allowed Ateneo's Matt Nieto to get the win at the free throw line. He then scored 12 points in a win over the UP Fighting Maroons that secured La Salle into second place. In a rematch against Ateneo, he hit a clutch floater that gave La Salle the win. In the Final Four, he guarded Adamson's best scorer in Jerrick Ahanmisi, limiting his scoring. The Archers made the finals once again, where they lost Game 1 in the best-of-three series. He rallied the Archers in Game 2 while contributing nine points, five assists and three steals, and they tied the series. The Archers however, lost in Game 3 and the Eagles reclaimed the championship.

Three games into Season 81, Montalbo fractured his left thumb, and expectations were that he would be out four to six weeks. However, against his doctors or his parents' advice, he played again after two weeks. He made his return in a loss to Ateneo. Montalbo reasoned that he made the risk of returning as it was his final season and that he would continue playing. His college career ended in a loss to FEU as they did not qualify for the postseason. He graduated with a degree in business management in 2021.

== Amateur career ==
After college, Montalbo joined the PBA D-League draft in 2019, where he was drafted by the AMA Online Education Titans. However, he was released days later, and was instead signed by the Marinerong Pilipino. Later that year, he also joined the Makati Super Crunch in the Maharlika Pilipinas Basketball League (MPBL).

== Professional career ==
=== TNT Tropang Giga (2020–2024) ===
Montalbo was then drafted 11th overall by the TNT Tropang Giga in the 2019 PBA draft. He was given an 18-month long contract. In TNT's first game during the 2020 season, he had two steals and two rebounds, but couldn't finish the game due to plantar fasciitis. He was often on the bench in his rookie season. That season, TNT made the finals, but lost to Barangay Ginebra in five games.

In a 2021 Philippine Cup loss to the San Miguel Beermen, Montalbo led TNT with 13 points. That performance led to him starting the following game, and he had 13 points, three rebounds, and two steals in a win over the NLEX Road Warriors. He then had a PBA career-high of 22 points, five rebounds, and three assists in a win over the NorthPort Batang Pier. In the playoffs, they defeated Ginebra in the quarterfinals. From their, TNT went on to win the title, and he claimed his first PBA championship. After that conference, he underwent surgery for his meniscus. He was able to return to the team in the middle of the 2021 Governors' Cup. He finished the season as a contender for Most Improved Player.

Three games into the 2022 Philippine Cup, Montalbo suffered a groin injury. He made his return in a loss to the Beermen. TNT finished the elimination round with a record of 8–3. TNT returned to the finals against the Beermen, where in Game 2, he had 14 points in a loss. TNT went on to lose to San Miguel in seven games. During the Commissioner's Cup, he underwent an appendectomy. In Game 4 of the Governors' Cup finals against Ginebra, he scored a season-high 16 points by making four treys as the team made a finals-record 21 three pointers and tied the series. TNT went on to win the next two games, and claim the championship.

=== Blackwater Bossing (2024–present) ===
On July 2, 2024, he and Jewel Ponferada were traded to Blackwater Bossing for Rey Nambatac.

== PBA career statistics ==
Legend
GP	Games played	MPG	Minutes per game	FG%	Field-goal percentage
3FG%	3-point field-goal percentage	4P%	4-point field-goal percentage	FT%	Free-throw percentage
RPG	Rebounds per game	APG	Assists per game	SPG	Steals per game
BPG	Blocks per game	PPG	Points per game	127	Career high

As of the end of 2025–26 season

=== Season-by-season averages ===
Year	Team	GP	MPG	FG%	3P%	4P%	FT%	RPG	APG	SPG	BPG	PPG
2020	TNT	17	11.5	.250	.226	—	.500	1.5	.4	.8	.2	1.6
2021	TNT	32	16.4	.477	.436	—	.708	1.4	1.5	.7	.1	6.4
2022–23	TNT	46	14.7	.392	.387	—	.710	1.5	1.2	.7	.2	4.1
2023–24	TNT	23	18.3	.362	.256	—	.611	1.6	2.8	.7	.1	3.9
2024–25	Blackwater	14	10.3	.300	.200	.000	1.000	1.6	.8	.4	.1	1.6
2025–26	Blackwater	1	2.6	—	—	—	.000	—	—	—	—	—
Career		133	14.8	.396	.361	.000	.671	1.5	1.4	.7	.2	4.0

== National team career ==
In 2022, Montalbo made his Philippine national team debut in a win over India, in which he had eight points. He then was a last-minute addition to the roster for the 2021 SEA Games, where the Philippines got a silver medal. As a TNT player for Coach Chot Reyes, he received ire from Gilas fans for being on the roster over the likes of CJ Perez. Gilas netizens mockingly called him the "best point guard in Asia".

== Player profile ==
In high school, Montalbo was known for his good outside shooting and slashing ability. He was also compared to Hector Calma for his passing skills. That changed in college, where he became known for his defense. As DLSU's best perimeter defender, he developed a reputation of physical defense against his opponents. His defense got him the nickname "Man of Steal". He can impact games off the bench or as the starting point guard. With his hard work and motivational skills, he is also known as a leader.

== Personal life ==
Montalbo's father Roger is a graduate from La Salle Bacolod and is currently the team manager of Tay Tung High School's basketball team. His mother Marizel is also a graduate from DLSU. His sister Khryzia is a former dean's lister. In college, he was in a relationship with La Salle volleyball star Desiree Cheng, but by 2020, they had stopped being together.
