= Four-point field goal =

Basketball score from a designated area

A four-point field goal (also called a four-pointer) is a field goal in a basketball game made from a part of the court designated for a four-point shot. The designated area is typically further from the basket than the line for a three-point field goal. A successful attempt is worth four points.

The four-pointer was first introduced in competition by the Harlem Globetrotters and was located 30 feet (9.1 m) away from the basket. The Big3 basketball league is the first professional league to use the four-point field goal. In Big3 games, there are three distinct circles beyond the three-point line that are designated as a four-point shot areas. A four-point shot is attempted when a player shoots with any part of their body touching the area of the four-point circle. The circle is located 30 feet from the basket.

The semi-pro American Basketball Association counts any basket made from beyond half-court as a four-point field goal.

Beginning in 2022, the WNBA All-Star Game has featured a four point field goal that occurs when a shot is in one of two circles located on each side of court about 28 feet (8.5 m) from the basket.

The Philippine Basketball Association, starting from the 2024 PBA Governors' Cup, features a four point line, stretching 27 feet (8.2 m) away from the basket, making it the first major professional 5×5 basketball league in the world to integrate a four point field goal in its rules.
