= Jeremiah Gray =

Filipino-American basketball player

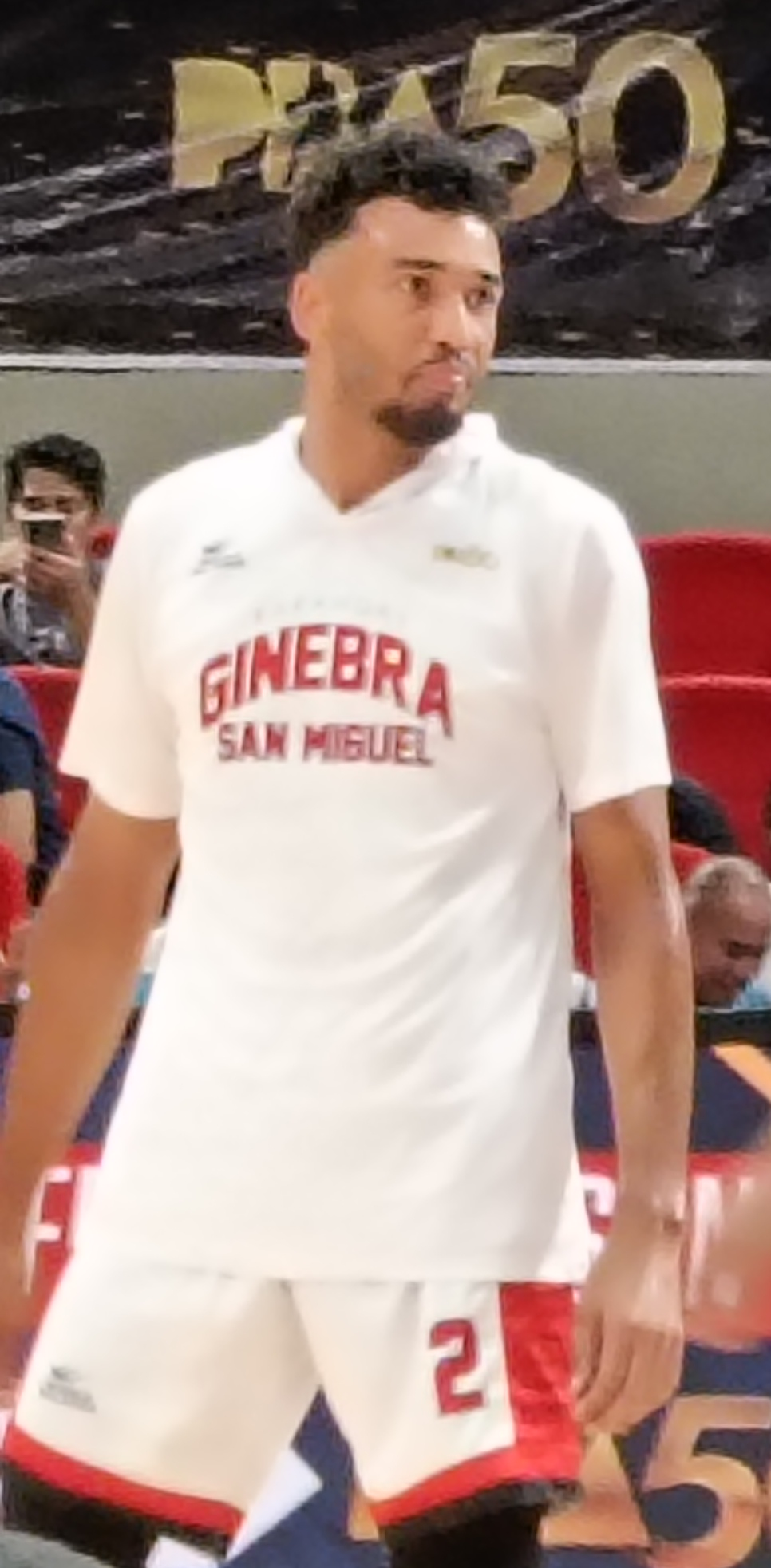
- Gray in 2025

No. 2 – Barangay Ginebra San Miguel
- Position: Small forward / shooting guard
- League: PBA

Personal information
- Born: August 16, 1996 (age 30) Thousand Oaks, California, U.S.
- Listed height: 6 ft 5 in (1.96 m)
- Listed weight: 205 lb (93 kg)

Career information
- High school: Westlake (Ventura County, California)
- College: Moorpark College (2014–2015); Dominican (CA) (2016–2018)
- PBA draft: 2022: 1st round, 2nd overall pick
- Drafted by: Terrafirma Dyip
- Playing career: 2018–present

Career history
- 2018: BBC Sparta Bertrange
- 2019–2020: San Miguel Alab Pilipinas
- 2022–present: Barangay Ginebra San Miguel

Career highlights
- 2× PBA champion (2022–23 Commissioner's, 2026 Commissioner's); PBA All-Star (2023); William Jones Cup champion (2019)

Jeremiah Dayao Gray (born August 16, 1996) is a Filipino-American professional basketball player for the Barangay Ginebra San Miguel of the Philippine Basketball Association (PBA).

== Early life and high school career ==
Gray is the son of a Filipina mother and an American father, who worked for the U.S. Postal Service for 35 years and was a former tennis player at Crenshaw High. He also has an older brother and an older sister. Baseball was his first sport, and he was a fan of the Los Angeles Dodgers. In Grade 3, he started to play basketball.

Entering high school, Gray was 5-foot-6. He then grew to 6-foot-3 in his junior year. Gray played only one season of varsity basketball with the Westlake Warriors, as he spent most of his time with the JV squad. During his senior season, he helped the Warriors capture the 2014 Marmonte League title (which was the team's last championship in that league) and reach the CIF Southern Section championship game. He was also on the All-Marmonte League Second Team. However, he didn't receive a single NCAA scholarship offer. He was recruited to play in the Philippines by San Beda. While accompanying a friend to tryouts for the Moorpark College basketball team, he decided to join the tryouts as well. From there, he was accepted into Moorpark.

== College career ==
=== Moorpark College ===
Gray first played for the Moorpark College Raiders in the California Community College Athletic Association (CCCAA). As a freshman, he appeared in 29 games for the Raiders, and averaged 9.6 points on 45.9 percent FG shooting with a 39.2 percent clip from the three-point region. He also grabbed 4.5 rebounds for the Raiders, which finished with an 18–11 slate after this season. His best game that season was when he dropped 21 points in a home match against the Santa Barbara Community College Vaqueros. He went 6-of-11 from long distance and also had five boards, two blocks, and a steal in towing his team to a 79–46 victory.

During the 2015–16 season, on December 5, 2015, Gray scored a career-high 22 points in a 95–89 win over CCSF. He averaged 14.1 points, 5.4 rebounds, and 1.3 assists per game while shooting 43.2 percent from the field, 33.1 percent from deep, and 78.2 percent from the free throw line that season. He finished his career with Moorpark a two-time All-Western State Conference First Team selection and California Top 100 honorable mention.

=== Dominican ===
During the summer of 2016, Gray was recruited by two Philippine schools: Ateneo de Manila and De La Salle. However, he had yet to get a Philippine passport and would have to undergo a two-year residency period. So he decided to go to Dominican University.

Gray appeared in 26 games in his junior year and started all of them, averaging 16.8 points, 4.5 rebounds, and 1.2 assists in 31.7 minutes. He scored a season-high 32 points in a one-point loss to Humboldt State. He was named to the San Francisco State Tip-Off Classic All-Tournament Team that season.

Prior to the start of the 2017–18 season, Gray was named to the Preseason All-PacWest team. He broke the school's single-season scoring record with 509 points in his final year. His college career high of 34 points came in a loss against the Holy Names Hawks. In his final college game, he had 17 points and eight rebounds in a loss to the Fresno Pacific Sunbirds. He ended up averaging 18.9 points per game on 42 percent shooting and 33.8 percent from three-point range that season. He also graduated with a degree in business administration. For his performance that season, he was selected to the All-Pac West Third Team.

== Professional career ==
=== PEA ===
Gray's professional basketball journey began on June 25, 2018, with PEA of Bangkok, Thailand. There, he got to play with fellow Filipino Asian import Almond Vosotros.

=== BBC Sparta Bertrange (2018) ===
Gray then signed a contract with the BBC Sparta Bertrange, a team from Luxembourg. Despite impressive averages of 20 points and 5.3 rebounds, he was cut from the team. To this day, he does not know why he was cut from the team.

=== Mighty Sports (2018–19) ===
Gray then signed with Mighty Sports for the 2019 Dubai International Tournament. His uncle Anton contacted Mighty Sports' head coach Charles Tiu, who gave him a spot on the roster. He debuted with 15 points on 7-of-9 shooting in a win. He followed that up with 21 points, making his first seven shots in the game. In their third game, he had 24 points, eight rebounds, and three assists in a win over Homenetmen. They reached the semifinals by beating Oil Sports Iraq, and he had 19 points in that game. They fell in the semifinals to Shabab Al Ahli Club. With another win over Homenetmen, they clinched bronze. He averaged 15.1 points and four rebounds in the tournament.

Gray rejoined Mighty Sports for the 2019 Jones Cup. They began their campaign with a win over Iran's under-23 team. In that game, he contributed 16 points, five rebounds, three assists, and three steals. The 6-foot-6 swingman was also a plus-21 in 21 minutes of game time. In a game against the University of British Columbia Thunderbirds, he fired 25 points on 6-of-8 shooting from deep while tallying six rebounds, and four assists. Mighty Sports was able to claim its second Jones Cup title by beating Chinese Taipei-B.

=== San Miguel Alab Pilipinas (2019–2020) ===
After his time with Mighty Sports, Gray then joined San Miguel Alab Pilipinas. In a loss to the Macau Wolf Warriors, he had 10 points. With Alab, he became more of a defensive player. This was seen when he had two clutch triples and two clutch blocks on Fubon Braves import O. J. Mayo in a win over Fubon. He finished that game with 17 points, six assists, five rebounds, three steals, and two blocks in 32 minutes of game time. In a one-point win over Hong Kong Eastern, he tallied 11 points, five rebounds, five assists, and three huge blocks, none bigger than the clutch block he had on Jon Siu's potential game-winning three-pointer. He had 12 points in a loss to Mono Vampire. He then had 13 points, seven rebounds, and a steal in a win over the Saigon Heat. However, the 2019–20 ABL season was suspended, and he, along with the other Filipino-Americans and imports on the team, were sent home.

=== Barangay Ginebra San Miguel (2022–present) ===
After being deemed ineligible for the 2021 PBA draft for failing to secure important documents, Gray entered his name for the PBA season 47 draft as he was coming off an ACL injury. He was drafted second overall by the Terrafirma Dyip. Two days later, he was then traded to the Barangay Ginebra for the 8th overall pick Javi Gomez de Liaño and guard Brian Enriquez.

Gray quickly recovered from his injury. After being projected to make his debut in January, he made his debut on October 9, 2022, during a 2022–23 Commissioner's Cup game versus the Bay Area Dragons. He had five points and two rebounds in his debut. He then had 10 points in a win over Terrafirma. His best game that conference came against the Blackwater Bossing as his head coach Tim Cone got his 1000th career win. He then contributed 11 points in a loss to the NLEX Road Warriors. In a win over the NorthPort Batang Pier, he had 12 points. Ginebra went on to win the title that conference. In a 2023 Governors' Cup game against NLEX, he had 19 points and the game-winning three-pointer.

During the preseason games of the 2023–24 season, Gray injured his knee in a fastbreak play. Surgery was then done to repair the ACL, MCL, and PCL tears on his knee, and he would not be able to play that season.

After a long recovery process that lasted 19 months, Gray returned to action in Game 2 of their 2024–25 Commissioner's Cup semifinal series against NorthPort.

== The Basketball Tournament ==
In 2020, Gray played for Team Hines during that year's edition of The Basketball Tournament (TBT). They lost to Sideline Cancer in the first round.

== 3x3 career ==
On March 19, 2021, Gray signed a one-year deal to play for the TNT Tropang Giga 3x3 in the PBA 3x3. While he wasn't eligible for the PBA Draft during this time, he could play in the PBA 3x3 since all that was required was a Filipino passport. With the Tropang Giga, he reteamed with Vosotros, his former teammate from his time in Thailand, and was joined by Samboy de Leon and Lervin Flores. To prepare for the tournament, he practiced with FIBA 3x3 veteran Kareem Maddox. The Tropang Giga won Leg 1 of the first conference of the 2021 season over the Meralco Bolts 3x3. However, in Leg 2, he hurt his knee against the Limitless Appmasters. The injury was diagnosed as a torn ACL and he missed the rest of the PBA 3x3 season. He underwent successful surgery in the US.

== Professional career statistics ==
Legend
GP	Games played	MPG	Minutes per game	FG%	Field-goal percentage
3FG%	3-point field-goal percentage	4P%	4-point field-goal percentage	FT%	Free-throw percentage
RPG	Rebounds per game	APG	Assists per game	SPG	Steals per game
BPG	Blocks per game	PPG	Points per game	127	Career high

=== Total League ===
Year	Team	GP	MPG	FG%	3P%	FT%	RPG	APG	SPG	BPG	PPG
2018–19	Sparta Bertrange	3	31.6	.442	.313	.818	5.3	1.0	1.7	.3	20.0
Career		3	31.6	.442	.313	.818	5.3	1.0	1.7	.3	20.0

=== ABL ===
Year	Team	GP	MPG	FG%	3P%	FT%	RPG	APG	SPG	BPG	PPG
2019–20	Alab	15	21.5	.372	.246	.833	3.9	2.1	.9	.1	8.4
Career		15	21.5	.372	.246	.833	3.9	2.1	.9	.1	8.4

=== PBA ===
As of the end of 2024–25 season

=== Season-by-season averages ===
Year	Team	GP	MPG	FG%	3P%	4P%	FT%	RPG	APG	SPG	BPG	PPG
2022–23	Barangay Ginebra	44	20.3	.358	.314	—	.758	3.8	1.6	.2	.5	6.9
2024–25	Barangay Ginebra	15	8.2	.255	.154	.000	1.000	1.5	.4	.3	.3	2.3
Career		59	17.3	.343	.293	.000	.789	3.2	1.3	.2	.4	5.7

== Personal life ==
Gray's older brother Joshua played baseball at Westlake with Christian Yelich, the former National League MVP with the Milwaukee Brewers. His older sister Jaymee, graduated from New York University with a degree in English and journalism. She excelled in the high jump for the Westlake Warriors’ track and field team. His uncle, Johnny Gray, is a four-time Olympian who secured bronze in the 800-meter race at the 1992 Olympics in Barcelona. Another uncle, Anton Brodett, is a former head coach of the UE Junior Warriors.
