= McKenzie Moore =

American basketball player (born 1992)

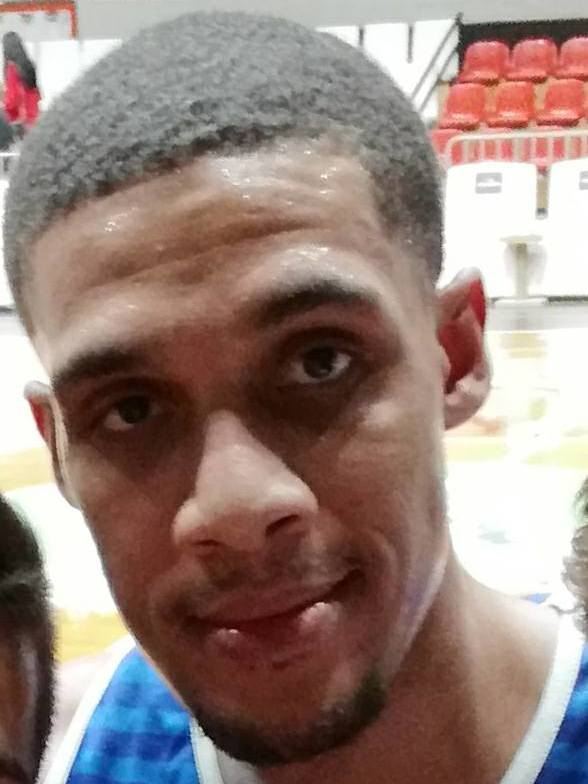
- Moore with Lavrio in May 2018

No. 94 – Rajawali Medan
- Position: Point guard / shooting guard
- League: IBL

Personal information
- Born: May 11, 1992 (age 34) Santa Rosa, California, U.S.
- Listed height: 6 ft 6 in (1.98 m)
- Listed weight: 190 lb (86 kg)

Career information
- High school: College Park (Pleasant Hill, California)
- College: CC of San Francisco (2011–2012); UTEP (2012–2014)
- NBA draft: 2015: undrafted
- Playing career: 2015–present

Career history
- 2015: Nelson Giants
- 2015: Leuven Bears
- 2016: Canterbury Rams
- 2016–2017: Promitheas Patras
- 2017: Canterbury Rams
- 2017–2018: Lavrio
- 2018: Avtodor Saratov
- 2018–2019: Banvit
- 2020: Anwil Włocławek
- 2021: Ironi Nahariya
- 2021: TNT Tropang Giga
- 2024: Bishrelt Metal
- 2024–2025: Zavkhan Brothers
- 2026-present: Rajawali Medan

Career highlights
- Polish Cup champion (2020); William Jones Cup winner (2019); All-Greek Basketball League Team (2018); Greek League PIR Leader (2018); Greek All-Star (2018); NZNBL MVP (2016); NZNBL Most Outstanding Guard (2016); NZNBL Assist Champion (2016); 2× NZNBL All-Star Five (2015, 2016)

McKenzie Zachary Moore (born May 11, 1992) is an American professional basketball player for Rajawali Medan of the Indonesian Basketball League (IBL). He played college basketball for City College of San Francisco and the UTEP Miners before playing professionally in New Zealand, Belgium, Greece, Russia, Turkey, Poland, Israel, and the Philippines. He earned NZNBL MVP in 2016 playing for the Canterbury Rams.

== High school career ==
Moore attended College Park High School in Pleasant Hill, California. As a senior at College Park in 2010–11, he averaged 18 points, six rebounds and 11 assists en route to being tabbed MVP of the Diablo Valley Athletic League. He led College Park to a 22–3 record and earned MVP honors at three tournaments, including the Jim Stephenson Invitational. Prior to his senior year, he gave an oral commitment to Saint Mary's but never signed a letter of intent.

== College career ==
Due to a sub-par academic record, Moore was unable to sign with a Division I program coming out of high school. He instead enrolled at City College of San Francisco for the 2011–12 season and played for the Rams as a freshman.

Moore enrolled at UTEP for the spring 2012 semester and joined the Miners men's basketball team in December 2012 for the rest of the 2012–13 season. He appeared in 25 games with 15 starts as a sophomore, averaging 8.6 points, 5.2 rebounds, 2.0 assists and 1.4 steals in 24.4 minutes per game. He rated among the Conference USA leaders in blocked shots and steals, finishing 13th in both categories. On January 30, 2013, he scored a season-high 18 points against UAB. He was named to the 2013 Conference USA Commissioner's Academic Honor Roll (minimum 3.0 cumulative grade point average) and was named a Conference USA Men's Basketball All-Academic Team honoree.

After a promising sophomore season for the Miners, Moore ran into controversy as a junior in 2013–14. He missed the team's fifth game of the season on November 23 with a concussion, and the team's tenth game of the season on December 16 due to suspension. His December 16 suspension was imposed by head coach Tim Floyd after Moore sat near the end of the team bench after being subbed off against Sacramento State on December 7, and refusing to head to the locker room upon being told to do so by Floyd. He played three further games for UTEP before he and teammate Jalen Ragland were suspended from the team indefinitely starting with the December 28 game against Western Illinois. He was later dismissed from the program on January 7, along with Ragland and Justin Crosgile, for gambling on sporting events. He appeared in just 11 games for UTEP in 2013–14 and made nine starts, averaging a team-high 13.1 points, as well as 4.5 rebounds and 2.7 assists in 27.3 minutes per game.

== Professional career ==
=== Nelson Giants (2015) ===
In January 2015, Moore signed with the Nelson Giants for the 2015 New Zealand NBL season. He had three 30-point games during the season and earned three Player of the Week awards, with his third one coming after scoring 35 points against the Taranaki Mountainairs on June 6. He helped the Giants finish the regular season in second place with a 13–5 record before losing 97–85 to the Wellington Saints in the semi-finals, with Moore scoring nine points on 2-of-11 shooting. In the semi-final loss, Moore fractured the sesamoid bone in his foot, but chose not to have an MRI scan. He appeared in all 19 games for the Giants in 2015, averaging 21.7 points, 5.8 rebounds, 4.2 assists, 2.1 steals and 1.7 blocks per game. He subsequently earned NBL All-Star Five honors.

Upon the conclusion of the Nelson Giants' season on July 4, Moore returned to the United States and joined the Milwaukee Bucks for the 2015 Las Vegas Summer League. He appeared in three of the Bucks' six summer league games, recording his best game of the tournament on July 16 with two rebounds, two assists and two steals in 11 minutes against the Phoenix Suns.

=== Leuven Bears (2015) ===
On November 19, 2015, Moore signed a try-out contract with the Leuven Bears of the Belgian Basketball League. He made his debut for the club two days later, recording four points, two rebounds and two steals in 13 minutes against VOO Wolves Verviers-Pepinster. He was then released after being ruled out for four to six weeks with a broken toe, the same toe injury he suffered in New Zealand.

=== Canterbury Rams (2016) ===
On April 4, 2016, Moore signed with the Canterbury Rams as an injury replacement for Jamie Adams. He made his debut for the Rams four days later, recording 32 points, 13 rebounds, five assists and three steals in a 91–78 win over the Southland Sharks. He subsequently earned Player of the Week honors for Round 5. On April 30, he scored 32 points in a 107–97 loss to the Nelson Giants. On May 8, he recorded 16 points, nine rebounds and 13 assists in a 95–82 win over the Hawke's Bay Hawks. On May 14, he recorded a triple-double with 19 points, 11 rebounds and 10 assists in a 106–78 win over the Hawks. He helped the Rams win the minor premiership with a first-place finish and a 13–5 record before losing 104–85 to the Super City Rangers in the semi-finals despite a 35-point effort from Moore. For the season, he was named the NBL Most Valuable Player. In 13 games for the Rams, he averaged 22.4 points, 6.2 rebounds, 8.0 assists and 3.4 steals per game.

After attending NBA mini-camps held by the Brooklyn Nets and the Dallas Mavericks, Moore accepted an offer by the Mavericks to join their summer league team for the 2016 NBA Summer League. In six games for the Mavericks, he averaged 6.3 points, 3.7 rebounds, 1.7 assists in 18.0 minutes per game.

=== Promitheas Patras (2016–2017) ===
On August 16, 2016, Moore signed with Promitheas Patras of the Greek Basket League. Promitheas missed the playoffs in 2016–17 with a 10–16 record. Moore appeared in all 26 games for the team, averaging 10.9 points, 5.3 rebounds, 2.5 assists and 1.4 steals per game.

=== Return to Canterbury (2017) ===
On April 27, 2017, Moore signed with the Canterbury Rams for the second half of the 2017 New Zealand NBL season. Rams coach Mark Dickel looked to bring back Moore to bolster the squad and revive their campaign after they started the season with a 5–5 record. However, in his season debut on May 5, the Rams were defeated 105–94 by the Southland Sharks, with Moore recording 11 points, six rebounds and six assists. On May 20, he recorded a triple-double with 27 points, 11 rebounds and 11 assists in a 91–83 win over the Hawke's Bay Hawks. He was subsequently named Player of the Week for Round 10. On May 27, he recorded 25 points, 10 rebounds and six assists in a 79–71 win over the Sharks. He was subsequently named Player of the Week for Round 11. He went on to miss the final three games of the regular season after spraining his foot against Southland in Round 11. The Rams finished the regular season in fourth place with a 10–8 record, and lost 94–73 to the Wellington Saints in the semi-finals. Moore had 21 points, nine rebounds and six assists in the loss. He appeared in six games for the Rams, averaging 17.8 points, 7.8 rebounds, 7.3 assists and 1.8 steals per game.

=== Lavrio (2017–2018) ===
On July 11, 2017, Moore signed with Lavrio of the Greek Basket League, returning to Greece for a second stint. Lavrio finished the 2017–18 regular season in sixth place with a 14–12 record, before losing to Promitheas in the quarter-finals. In 25 games, he averaged 17.1 points, 5.9 rebounds, 4.9 assists and 2.1 steals per game.

=== Avtodor Saratov (2018) ===
On July 21, 2018, Moore signed with Russian team Avtodor Saratov of the VTB United League. On November 11, 2018, his contract was terminated by mutual agreement. He appeared in two BCL games, two FIBA Europe Cup games, and four VTB United League games.

=== Banvit (2018–2019) ===
On November 12, 2018, Moore signed with Banvit of the Turkish Basketball Super League. In nine league games, he averaged 9.1 points, 5.2 rebounds, 4.7 assists and 1.6 steals per game. He also averaged 13.0 points, 6.0 rebounds, 4.3 assists and 1.1 steals in eight BCL games.

=== Philippines (2019) ===
Between July and September 2019, Moore played for Mighty Sports at the Jones Cup tournament and TNT KaTropa at the East Asia Super League Terrific 12.

=== Anwil Włocławek (2020) ===
On February 3, 2020, Moore signed with Anwil Włocławek of the Polish Basketball League. On February 14, in the quarter-final of the Polish Basketball Cup, Moore suffered a torn ligament in his ankle that ruled him out for at least four weeks. Despite losing Moore, Włocławek went on to win the title.

On July 22, 2020, Moore re-signed with Włocławek for the 2020–21 season. He was released by Włocławek on December 30, 2020.

=== Ironi Nahariya (2021) ===
On January 9, 2021, Moore signed with Ironi Nahariya of the Israeli Premier League.

=== TNT Tropang Giga (2021) ===
On November 2, 2021, Moore signed with TNT Tropang Giga of the Philippine Basketball Association. He was replaced on the roster by Aaron Fuller on December 25 after he returned to the United States to deal with an injured MCL.

=== Strong Group Athletics (2024) ===
In January 2024, Moore joined Strong Group Athletics for the 33rd Dubai International Basketball Championship.

=== Mongolia (2024–2025) ===
In October 2024, Moore joined the Bishrelt Metal of The League. He left after four games.

In December 2024, Moore joined Zavkhan Brothers of The League. In 15 games to finish the 2024–25 season, he averaged 23.2 points, 10.8 rebounds, 8.7 assists, 2.0 steals and 1.7 blocks per game.

Moore returned Zavkhan Brothers for the 2025–26 season, but left in early December after appearing in 12 games. He averaged 24.0 points, 9.6 rebounds, 9.6 assists, 2.0 steals and 1.4 blocks per game.

=== Rajawali Medan (2026–present) ===
In April 2026, Moore signed with Rajawali Medan of the Indonesian Basketball League (IBL).
