= Matthew Wright (basketball) =

Filipino-Canadian basketball player (born 1991)

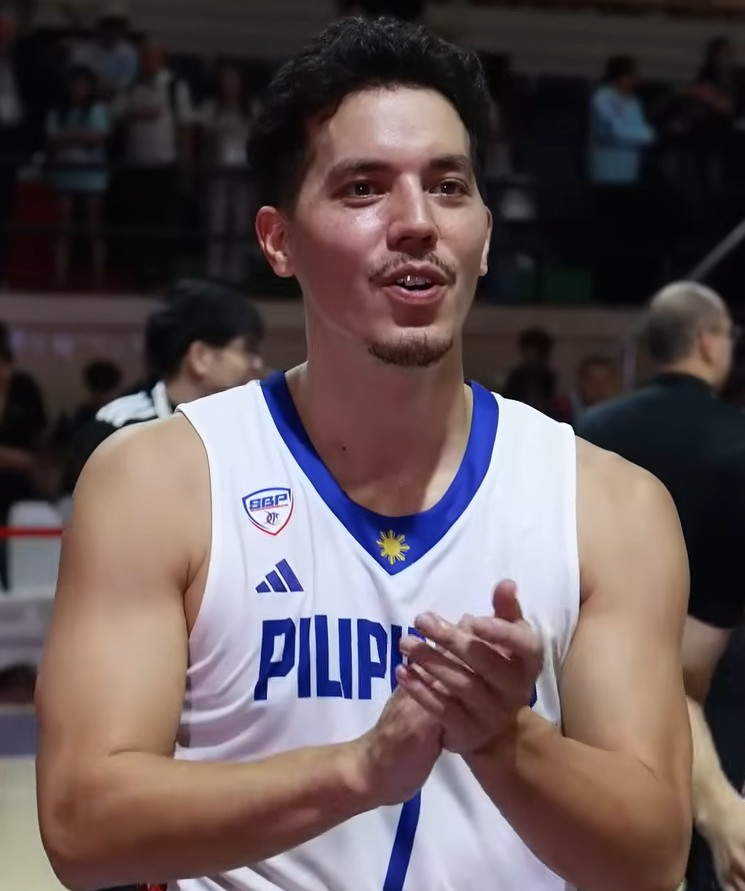
- Wright in 2025

No. 35 – Saitama Broncos
- Position: Shooting guard / small forward
- League: B.League

Personal information
- Born: February 7, 1991 (age 35) Toronto, Ontario, Canada
- Listed height: 6 ft 4 in (1.93 m)
- Listed weight: 207 lb (94 kg)

Career information
- High school: Martingrove Collegiate Institute (Toronto, Ontario)
- College: St. Bonaventure (2010–2014)
- NBA draft: 2014: undrafted
- PBA draft: 2016: Special draft
- Drafted by: Phoenix Fuel Masters
- Playing career: 2014–present

Career history
- 2014–2015: Quimper Rams
- 2015–2016: Westports Malaysia Dragons
- 2016–2022: Phoenix Super LPG Fuel Masters
- 2022–2024: Kyoto Hannaryz
- 2024–2025: Kawasaki Brave Thunders
- 2026–present: Saitama Broncos

Career highlights
- ABL champion (2016); ABL ASEAN Heritage Import MVP (2016); 2× PBA All-Star (2017, 2018); 2× PBA All-Star Game MVP (2017 Mindanao, 2017 Luzon); PBA Mythical First Team (2020); 2× PBA Mythical Second Team (2018, 2021); PBA All-Rookie Team (2017); PBA Co-Order of Merit (2021)

Matthew Andrew Christopher Wright (born February 7, 1991) is a Filipino-Canadian professional basketball player for the Saitama Broncos of the Japanese B.League. He played college basketball for the St. Bonaventure Bonnies. He has since become an ABL champion, a two-time PBA All-Star, and a member of the Philippine national team.

In college, Wright helped lead the St. Bonaventure Bonnies to an Atlantic 10 championship and into the 2012 NCAA tournament. In his senior season, he led the team in scoring. After college, Wright started his professional career in France, and then went on to play for the Westports Malaysia Dragons, with whom he won an ABL championship with. He then spent six seasons with the Phoenix Fuel Masters before joining the Kyoto Hannaryz in 2022.

== Early life ==
Wright was born on February 7, 1991, in Toronto to Chris Wright and Ofelia Wright (née Agustin). He grew up there with his parents, grandmother, and some relatives. The Filipino community in Toronto exposed him to basketball, which he started learning at 10 years old. Vince Carter and Kobe Bryant were also his influences growing up. While attending Bloorlea Middle School, he was selected as their Athlete of the Year.

== High school career ==
Wright played for the Scadding Court AAU basketball program in his teen years. He also played at the Martingrove Collegiate Institute, leading them in scoring with 21 points a game. He did consider committing to the La Salle Green Archers in the Philippines before his final year of high school, but decided to remain in Toronto so that he could be recruited by a Division 1 program. In his senior year, he averaged 23 points, 4 rebounds, 7 assists and 2 blocks per game. He also led them to their second consecutive Toronto District School Board Triple-A championship.

Wright had offers from Maine, Duquesne, and Santa Clara University. However, the NCAA questioned whether he had accepted money to play for the Philippines men's national under-18 team. While he waited for the NCAA to clear him, other schools lost interest in him and he considered playing for the University of Toronto. During this time, he made an unofficial campus visit to St. Bonaventure, who then helped him become eligible as the rumors of him accepting money were proven to be false. He then committed to play for the St. Bonaventure Bonnies in 2010.

== College career ==
In Wright's first season, he started off poorly, shooting one-for-21 from three point range. He bounced back by scoring 18 points against the George Washington Colonials and followed up that performance with 15 points in a win over Duquesne. The team started relying on him more to provide off the bench scoring. He finished his rookie season as his team's leader in three point shooting (.426), second in steals (.8), fourth in assists (1.6), and fifth in scoring (6.9).

In his sophomore season, Wright was promoted to the starting lineup after one of the senior guards got hurt. During that season, he hit a game-winning three pointer from the corner off a pass from teammate Andrew Nicholson against the St. Joseph's Hawks. Behind Nicholson, the Bonnies won the Atlantic 10 championship that year. They also made it to the 2012 NCAA tournament, where they lost to the Florida State Seminoles. He finished the season as the team's leader in assists and steals while averaging 6.8 points and 2.5 rebounds.

In his junior season, Wright had 22 points on eight-of-eleven shooting including four-of-four behind the arc when the Bonnies beat the Temple Owls. He followed that with an 18-point night in SBU's triumph over the Hawks. He also struggled through a torn plantar fascia during this time. Still, he was able to average 7.3 points per game and finished in the top 10 in three point shooting in the A10.

In his senior season, Wright had a college career-high 27 points on 10 of 14 shooting in a win against Canisius, which gave the Bonnies a 3–0 start to their season. The Bonnies then started A10 play with him scoring 20 points in a win over the Richmond Spiders. He then had 18 points against Fordham, then had 24 points against George Mason, which were both wins. He also got a cut below his right eye that required two stitches after the game. For those performances, he was named Atlantic 10 Co-Player of the Week along with Richmond guard Kendall Anthony. He then had 22 points on 8 of 15 shooting including 5 of 8 behind the arc in a win against the St. Louis Billikens. For that season, he led St. Bonaventure in scoring with 16.3 points per game. Aside from finishing in the top 10 for scoring in the Atlantic 10 conference, he also finished in the top 10 for assists, three-pointers made, minutes played, and free throw percentage (which he led the entire conference). He graduated with a degree in history.

== Professional career ==
=== UJAP Quimper 29 (2014–2015) ===
After Wright graduated, he applied for the 2014 NBA draft, where he went undrafted. For a while, he was working in a warehouse in Rexdale. He then was able to sign a professional contract to play for the French club Quimper. This made him the 15th St. Bonaventure men's basketball alumnus to sign a professional contract since Mark Schmidt became the Bonnies’ head coach in 2007. He made his debut in a 91–87 loss to Cognac on October 25, 2014. He did not score but he dished out three assists in 14 minutes of action. However, he time there did not last long as he did not have a good relationship with the head coach there.

=== Westports Malaysia Dragons (2015–2016) ===
Before the start of the 2015–16 ABL season, the Westports Malaysia Dragons signed Wright and Jason Brickman to be their ASEAN Imports. On November 7, 2015, Wright recorded 30 points, 4 rebounds, 3 assists and 6 3-pointers made in a 100–92 win over the Saigon Heat. That season, Wright was named as the ASEAN Heritage MVP after he helped lead the Dragons to the finals of the ASEAN Basketball League on his maiden season with an average of 23.1 points, 4.2 rebounds and 3.4 assists per game. The Dragons were able to claim their first ABL championship in franchise history in five games. He scored 461 points that season, the most by a non-World Import in a single season and also owned the record for most three-pointers made in a single game with 10.

=== Mighty Sports (2016) ===
On September 16, 2016, it was reported that he was going to be part of the Mighty Sports lineup for the 2016 Merlion Cup. In the team's second game on the group stages, he scored 20 points against the Westports Malaysia Dragons to help the team get a semifinals berth. Mighty Sports eventually lost to the Shanghai Sharks in the finals of the 2016 Merlion Cup after Jimmer Fredette was fouled in the final possession taking a triple who then drained the 3 free throws.

=== Phoenix Fuel Masters (2016–2022) ===
==== 2016–17 season: Rookie season ====
Coach Chot Reyes committed all the players of the Gilas pool to the PBA draft, including Wright. With him being a member of Gilas, he didn't need to play in the PBA D-League for two conferences, which was a requirement for other Fil-foreigners. He reunited with Ariel Vanguardia who was his coach when he played for the Westports Malaysia Dragons, after he was selected by the Phoenix Fuel Masters as their Gilas draft selection in the 2016 PBA draft. On November 8, 2016, he signed a 3-year, P8.5M rookie max deal with Phoenix.

Due to food poisoning, he missed the team's first game of the 2016-17 PBA Philippine Cup where they lost 94–87 to Blackwater Elite. In his PBA debut, he scored 14 points to help his team have an upset win against the San Miguel Beermen. Against the Meralco Bolts, he had 22 points, including crucial free throws, that sealed the win for Phoenix. He then had a near triple-double of 12 points, 12 rebounds, and 9 assists in a win over the NLEX Road Warriors. He then followed it up by scoring 18 points in the second half to take a win against Barangay Ginebra. For those performances, he was given his first Player of the Week award. In his first All-Star Game, he received co-MVP honors along with Troy Rosario of the opposing side. That week, he also competed in his first three-point contest and won another All-Star Game MVP. He scored 27 points in a rematch with Ginebra in the Commissioner's Cup, taking the win over them. But they failed to qualify for the playoffs, as they lost to NLEX despite him scoring a career-high 42 points, the most by a rookie since Eric Menk in 1999. In the 2017 Governors' Cup, he struggled, as Phoenix failed to win games. He had 36 points against the Rain or Shine Elasto Painters, but they still got their eighth straight loss, a franchise-worst. He finished the season on the All-Rookie Team with 16.5 points, 6.1 rebounds, and 3.7 assists.

==== 2017–18 season ====
After starting the 2017–18 Philippine Cup with a loss, Phoenix went on to win two straight, with Wright scoring 13 of his 19 points against NLEX for that second straight win. On his 27th birthday, he scored a game-high 16 points, 5 rebounds, and made the game-winning assist to Doug Kramer against the TNT Katropa. He scored 32 points against the Globalport Batang Pier to secure the final spot in the playoffs for Phoenix. But they were eliminated by the Katropa. This loss gave him more rest after spending time between Phoenix and national team duties. In the Commissioner's Cup, he finished off a comeback from down sixteen against the Philippine Cup finalists Magnolia Hotshots by making a step-back three with 3.2 seconds remaining. He finished the game with 19 points on 7-of-14 shooting. In a double-overtime win over Ginebra, he made back-to-back scores in the second overtime that sealed the win for Phoenix. He finished that game with 19 points, 10 rebounds, three assists, one steal, and no turnovers in 44 minutes. During the 2018 All-Star Week, he once again played in the All-Star Game and competed in the three-point contest. In an overtime game against the Bolts, he had 28 points and six assists, but missed a jumper that could have won the game for them in overtime. In a win against Globalport, he had 24 points on six threes, but received a technical foul after retaliating from a hit to his head from opposing import Malcolm White. In the Governors' Cup, they finished with a franchise-best record of 8–3 record, gaining a twice-to-beat advantage and second-place finish in the standings. He had 23 points in their last win. But they lost in the first round to the seventh-seeded Bolts. He finished the season third in the league in scoring with 17.6 points per game.

==== 2019 season ====
Before the start of the 2019 PBA season, Wright was awarded a three-year contract extension. He was also awarded a spot on the Second Mythical Team for the previous season. In a Philippine Cup match versus the Katropa, he scored 23 points (with seven coming in the overtime period) to lead the Fuel Masters to their second straight overtime win. He had 25 points in a win over the Beermen that secured the top seed for the Fuel Masters. They then beat the Alaska Aces to advance to the semifinals for the first time in franchise history. In the semifinals, they lost their first two games to the Beermen, as their playoff inexperience started to show. But in Game 3, he hit four crucial free throws despite battling bronchitis to give Phoenix the win. However, he received a flagrant foul for hitting Beermen guard Von Pessumal. The Beermen went on to win the next two games, eliminating the Fuel Masters from the playoffs. In the Commissioner's Cup, Phoenix had three straight losses with Coach Louie Alas and Calvin Abueva suspended. They also lost import Rob Dozier to a foot injury. He scored 28 points to lead Phoenix to a win over NorthPort and stop their win streak. In a comeback win against Ginebra, he combined with replacement import Richard Howell for 27 points in the third quarter. He finished that game with 32 points, while Howell had 31 points and 21 rebounds. More importantly, it was their second straight win. For those performances, he won a unanimous Player of the Week award. In the Governors' Cup, he had a foot injury during a team practice. Despite the injury, he was able to play in Phoenix's final game, in which he hit a tough corner three with 1.2 seconds remaining to beat Blackwater. He dedicated the game-winner to retiring veterans Kramer and Willy Wilson.

==== 2020 season: Bubble season ====
On September 17, the PBA Board of Governors have approved a plan to restart the season on October 11 (originally on October 9), then was given a provisional approval by the Inter-Agency Task Force for the Management of Emerging Infectious Diseases (IATF-EID) on September 24. All games were played in the "PBA bubble" in Angeles City, the isolation zone specifically created for league operations. Before the start of the season, interim coach Topex Robinson was made permanent head coach.

In the first game of the 2020 Philippine Cup, he scored 36 points in a win over the Bolts. He dedicated that performance to his late childhood idol Kobe Bryant and to coach Robinson. He then followed up that with 23 points, seven rebounds, and nine assists in a win over NorthPort. In a loss to TNT, he made all 13 of his free throw attempts and finished the game with 31 points. This was the most free throws made without missing since LA Tenorio also went 13-of-13 in 2017. Against Magnolia, he scored 23 points to help Phoenix overcome a 23-point deficit. In the return of Abueva after a 16-month ban against NLEX, he scored 28 points. He continued his high-scoring with 33 points in a win against the Terrafirma Dyip. He cooled down with just 10 points against SMB, but RJ Jazul's career-high of 33 points gave Phoenix the win. He also had 10 assists. At the end of the elimination round, he emerged as a leading MVP candidate, leading the league in statistical points and leading Phoenix to the 2nd seed.

They beat Magnolia in the quarterfinals, as he hit a game-winning three point shot off the bench. However, in Game 1 of the semifinals against TNT, he injured his ankle. He decided to play through the pain, as he played limited minutes in Game 2. In Game 3, he had 23 points, including a turnaround jumper that sealed the win and moved them one more win closer to the Finals. But TNT won the next two games, with TNT guard Bobby Ray Parks Jr. scoring 36 and 26 points on them, eliminating Phoenix from finals contention. At the end of the season, he was awarded a spot on the PBA's Elite Five. He also finished second in Best Player of the Conference voting, losing it to Barangay Ginebra's Stanley Pringle.

==== 2021 season ====
Wright scored 20 points in a loss to the Hotshots, now having Abueva, who had been acquired by them in the offseason before the 2021 Philippine Cup. He missed a game due to a sprained ankle, but Phoenix still won that game with Vic Manuel stepping up with 26 points and 12 rebounds. Following a league-imposed break, he and Manuel led the league in scoring, but had only one win to four losses up to that point. They got their second win against Rain or Shine when Wright made his only field goal of the game in the last 2.6 seconds of the game to put them up for good. He did contribute 12 rebounds and five assists. In the end, they were eliminated from playoff contention when they lost to Ginebra. In the Governors' Cup, he got another Player of the Week award after scoring 23 points in a Christmas Day win over NLEX. It was also during this time that he got offers to play in the Japanese B-League. For the period of February 11–13, he earned another Player of the Week award after scoring 27 points,10 assists, and the game-winning steal in a win over TNT. They secured the last spot for the playoffs with a win over NorthPort. At the end of the elimination round, he was no. 2 in statistical points, putting him in the running for Best Player of the Conference. Phoenix was eliminated in a blowout loss by Magnolia, in which he fouled out. He also admitted frustration with Phoenix losing key players to trades and free agency. He was made a member of the Second Mythical Team with averages of 16.3 points, 5.8 rebounds, and career-high averages of 6.4 assists and 1.6 steals.

==== 2022–23 season ====
Wright began talks on contract negotiations with Phoenix, keeping his options open on playing overseas. They failed however, to reach an agreement before the start of the season. Phoenix also tried trading him, but no takers were found. With the contract set to expire at the end of the 2022 Philippine Cup, he decided to play out the contract and set aside negotiations as not to distract the team. He began his season with 20 points in a loss to SMB. In Phoenix's penultimate game of the conference, he had 15 points, eight rebounds, and four assists to lead them in a rout over the Converge FiberXers. It was revealed that he had to leave for the US to marry his wife, and would not finish the conference. He mentioned that it could possibly be his last game with the team, as both him and Phoenix failed to reach a compromise in contract negotiations. He also mentioned that playing overseas or returning to the PBA with a different teams were options he was considering. In Phoenix's final game of the conference, they lost to Ginebra without him.

=== Kyoto Hannaryz (2022–2024) ===
On August 31, 2022, Wright announced that he had officially parted ways with Phoenix. On September 2, Kyoto Hannaryz of the Japanese B.League announced that they had signed him to a two-year deal (with the second year a team option). The contract came with perks and a clause that would allow him to play for the national team. The move reunited him with head coach Roy Rana, who was a rival head coach back when he was still in high school.

Wright went scoreless in his B.League debut against the Sendai 89ers, but recorded four assists and three rebounds. Despite a back injury, he played in their rematch the following day, contributing five points as the team bounced back with the win. He then missed back-to-back games against the Nagoya Flying Eagles. He returned with 10 points, but his team still lost to SeaHorses Mikawa. In the rematch, the team snapped their three-game losing streak, with him contributing eight points and four assists. Against Niigata Albirex, he had his best game yet with 16 points, five rebounds and three assists. He got to play in the Asia Rising Star game during the B.League's All-Star Weekend. In the first game after All-Star Weekend, he had 13 points and seven rebounds in a win over the Osaka Evessa. Against the Hiroshima Dragonflies, he scored a season-high 26 points and eight assists, but lost and slid to a 16–24 record. They did not make the playoffs after a record of 22–38.

On May 18, 2023, Wright signed a multi-year contract extension with the team. In a loss to the Yokohama B-Corsairs, he had a double-double of 19 points and 10 rebounds, both team-highs. In a matchup against fellow Filipino import Thirdy Ravena and the San-En NeoPhoenix, he scored a B.League career-high 31 points with seven triples, but lost to Ravena. Against the Utsunomiya Brex, he scored 19 points, four assists, three steals, and made the game-winning step-back three pointer. On January 6, 2024, Wright became the 5th Filipino to score 1,000 B.League career points. He reached that milestone in his 80th game, making him the fastest Filipino to reach that milestone. Once again, he got to play in the Asia Rising Star Game. In his first game after All-Star Weekend, he scored 24 points in a win over the Nagasaki Velca. Against the Saga Ballooners, he scored a B.League career-high 37 points and also made eight triples (with his last one the game-winning three pointer). Aside from his point total being the most in his B.League career, it was the most he had scored since scoring 42 back when he was a PBA rookie, and the most scored by a Filipino import in Japan. His eight three-pointers were the most he had made in his entire career. After the season, he opted out of his contract and after negotiations with Kyoto fell through, announced that he would not be returning to the team.

=== Kawasaki Brave Thunders ===
On July 25, 2024, Wright announced that he had signed with the Kawasaki Brave Thunders for the 2024–25 B.League season. They failed to make the playoffs after finishing with an 18–60 record. Although he had one more year left on his contract, he decided to forgo the 2025–26 B.League season to return to his mother's province of Tarlac and take care of her. In his lone season with the Brave Thunders, he averaged 10.4 points, 2.5 rebounds, and 2.6 assists per game.

== National team career ==
=== Junior national team ===
Wright was part of the Philippines men's national under-18 team coached by Franz Pumaren that competed in the four-nation Nokia Manila Youth Basketball Invitational 2008 and 2008 FIBA Asia Under-18 Championship. He was convinced by fellow Fil-Canadian Norbert Torres to join the team.

=== Senior national team ===
In 2016, he was included in the pool of the Philippine men's senior national team where the members of the Philippine squad that participated at the 2016 FIBA Asia Challenge was derived from.

The following year, Wright was on the team for the 2017 SEABA Championship, and he won a gold medal. He was also on the roster for that year's FIBA Asia Cup, and scored 25 points in a win over Qatar to clinch the top spot in Group B. However, Gilas only finished in seventh place after making back-to-back second-place finishes. He contributed 12 points (including a perfect 7-of-7 from the free throw line) in a win over Japan for the 2019 FIBA World Cup qualifiers.

In 2018, he was involved in the Philippines–Australia basketball brawl, as he was among nine Filipino players ejected from the game. As a result, him and Japeth Aguilar had to serve a one-game suspension, which was the least punishment among players involved. They were able to make their return in a qualifying game against Qatar.

For the final World Cup qualifiers in 2019, Wright was not included in the lineup. Still, Gilas qualified for the World Cup with a win over Kazakhstan. He returned to the Gilas pool for the World Cup, but experienced pains in his ankle. His ankle got better, but in the end, he was one of the final cuts from the final roster for the World Cup. He was able to win a gold medal in the 2019 SEA Games.

Wright begged off from the Gilas Pilipinas pool for the first window of the Fiba Asia Cup qualifiers due to rehab for an ankle injury. In 2022, he returned to Gilas for the 2021 SEA Games. Unlike last time, Gilas was denied its gold medal by Indonesia in the finals.

In 2025, Wright committed to Gilas for the 2025 SEA Games. This was his first time returning to the national team since 2022. This time, Gilas was able to win the gold medal, defeating Thailand in the finals.

== Personal life ==
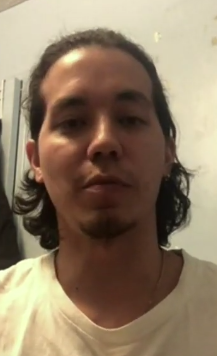
Wright in 2020

As of 2017, he is involved in a long-distance relationship with Gabriela Moscoso. They have two sons, Preston and Roman. They married on July 24, 2022.

== Career statistics ==
=== International ===
Legend
GP	Games played	MPG	Minutes per game	FG%	Field goal percentage
3P%	3-point field goal percentage	FT%	Free throw percentage	RPG	Rebounds per game
APG	Assists per game	SPG	Steals per game	BPG	Blocks per game
PPG	Points per game	**Bold**	Career high		Led the league

==== Season-by-season averages ====
Year	Team	League	GP	MPG	FG%	3P%	FT%	RPG	APG	SPG	BPG	PPG
2014–15	Quimper	LNB Pro B	16	23.9	.403	.343	.649	1.7	2.2	1.4	.1	9.8
2015–16	Westports Malaysia Dragons	ABL	**27**	**34.8**	**.453**	**.425**	**.740**	**4.1**	**3.0**	**2.0**	**.2**	**21.2**
Career		All Leagues	43	30.9	.442	.404	.715	3.2	2.7	1.8	.1	17.0

=== B.League ===
Year	Team	GP	MPG	FG%	3P%	FT%	RPG	APG	SPG	BPG	PPG
2022–23	Kyoto Hannaryz	**56**	**29.8**	.394	**.381**	**.853**	3.0	**4.7**	**1.1**	.0	**13.4**
2023–24	Kyoto Hannaryz	53	27.5	**.396**	.344	.782	3.0	3.2	.7	**.1**	13.1
Career		109	28.7	.395	.362	.840	3.0	4.0	.9	.1	13.2

=== PBA ===
Legend
GP	Games played	MPG	Minutes per game
FG%	Field-goal percentage	3P%	3-point field-goal percentage	FT%	Free-throw percentage
RPG	Rebounds per game	APG	Assists per game	SPG	Steals per game
BPG	Blocks per game	PPG	Points per game	**Bold**	Career high

As of the end of 2022–23 season

==== Season-by-season averages ====
Year	Team	GP	MPG	FG%	3P%	FT%	RPG	APG	SPG	BPG	PPG
2016–17	Phoenix	26	32.9	.363	.336	.788	**6.1**	3.7	1.1	.0	16.5
2017–18	Phoenix	35	33.1	.405	.343	.748	4.8	4.5	1.4	**.1**	17.6
2019	Phoenix Pulse	**37**	33.0	.380	.343	**.844**	4.2	4.4	1.4	**.1**	18.9
2020	Phoenix Super LPG	17	**37.2**	**.446**	**.394**	.802	4.4	5.5	1.2	.0	**21.1**
2021	Phoenix Super LPG	24	37.1	.357	.282	.796	5.8	**6.4**	**1.6**	**.1**	16.3
2022–23	Phoenix Super LPG	10	34.9	.342	.297	.750	5.1	5.9	**1.6**	.0	15.3
Career		149	34.3	.384	.336	.798	5.0	4.9	1.4	.1	17.8

=== NCAA ===
Legend
GP	Games played	GS	Games started	MPG	Minutes per game
FG%	Field goal percentage	3P%	3-point field goal percentage	FT%	Free throw percentage
RPG	Rebounds per game	APG	Assists per game	SPG	Steals per game
BPG	Blocks per game	PPG	Points per game	**Bold**	Career high

Year	Team	GP	GS	MPG	FG%	3P%	FT%	RPG	APG	SPG	BPG	PPG
2010–11	St. Bonaventure University	31	0	16.2	.386	.317	.846	1.9	1.6	.8	.1	4.7
2011–12	St. Bonaventure University	**32**	18	27.3	.351	.317	.778	2.5	2.8	.9	**.3**	6.8
2012–13	St. Bonaventure University	26	21	23.8	**.430**	.306	.813	1.7	2.0	.8	.1	7.3
2013–14	St. Bonaventure University	**32**	**31**	**34.9**	.409	**.362**	**.861**	**3.1**	**3.2**	**1.1**	.1	**16.3**
Career		121	70	25.7	.396	.333	.839	2.3	2.4	.9	.1	8.9
