= Mighty Sports =

- Founded: 2011
- Folded: 2020
- Team colors
- Team manager: Wowie Evangelista
- Head coach: Charles Tiu
- Ownership: Mighty Sports Apparel and Accessories
- Championships: Republica Cup: 4 (2013, 2014, 2016, 2018) William Jones Cup: 2 (2016, 2019) Dubai International Basketball Tournament: 1 (2020)
- Website: www.mightysports.ph/our-team

Mighty Sports (sometimes referred to as Mighty Sports - Go For Gold for sponsorship reasons) is a basketball team based in the Philippines playing in various domestic tournaments. The team won four championships in the Republica Cup in 2013, 2014, 2016 and 2018.

The team represented the Philippines when they participated in the 2016 William Jones Cup in Taiwan, their first international tournament which they won with a sweep bearing a record of 8–0.

They have competed in the Dubai International Basketball Championship participating in the 2017, 2019, 2020 editions. They became the first team based outside the Middle East to win the Dubai tournament in the 2020 edition. The squad was also the Philippine representative in the 2019 William Jones Cup.

Mighty Sports is the athletic arm of sportswear manufacturing company Mighty Sports Apparel and Accessories, Inc.

== Competitive record ==
=== Republica Cup ===
Mighty Sports became first known to basketball fans in minor basketball leagues such as the Republica Cup (an invitational basketball tournament held in Malolos, Bulacan as part of the commemoration of the First Philippine Republic, known as the Malolos Convention). It also sponsored the Adamson Falcons men's basketball team and the Bulacan State University Golden Gears men's basketball team in the Filsports Basketball Association, and the Philippine Dragon Boat Team.

In 2014, the team, led by former PBA player Kenneth Duremdes and Kris Rosales, bagged the second Republica Cup title, after winning the finals game against Malolos Republica, 86–84. One year later, the team did not make it to the finals after losing the semifinals match against AMA University.

On February 4, 2016, Mighty Sports, now-led by former UAAP MVP Kiefer Ravena, successfully reclaimed the Republica Cup championship, beating Hobe Mackway Travel in the finals game, 85–82. In addition, Bright Akhuetie was named as the Tournament MVP.

=== Pilipinas Commercial Basketball League ===
In March 2016, the team joined the Pilipinas Commercial Basketball League. Historically, this is the first entry into a major basketball league. Ravena, a 2016 PBA draft prospect, together with Ty Tang, who came out of retirement in the Philippine Basketball Association, and import Bright Akhuetie are some of the players who retained in the team's line-up for the Champion's Cup.

Mighty Sports also appointed Bo Perasol as team consultant, Mike Fermin as head coach and Charles Tiu as assistant coach of the team, which is one of the two new teams that competed in the 2016 PCBL Chairman's Cup, alongside SCTEX Road Warriors.

On its first game, Mighty Sports completes an upset victory against Founder's Cup champion Jumbo Plastic Linoleum Giants, 79–70 in the opening day of Champion's Cup on March 6, 2016. Ravena led the team's campaign with 16 points.

=== William Jones Cup ===
==== 2016 ====
The team represented the Philippines in the 2016 William Jones Cup, with 7 foreign reinforcements leading the team, in lieu of the Gilas Cadets who were not available for playing. They beat team A of host nation Taiwan, who were fielding a second team, on their opening match. They then beat the South Korea national team on their second match. They won their third match against the US team Sacramento State Hornets. They beat Japan on their fourth by a blowout of 21 points. They faced the India national team on their fifth match and won by a 20 points margin to remain the only unbeaten team as of the 6th day of the tournament. They cemented the tournament's title by beating Iran on their 6th match. Mighty Sports continued their winning streak by beating Egypt in their seventh match and swept the entire competition beating Taiwanese Team B.

==== 2019 ====
Mighty Sports once again represented the Philippines in the 2019 William Jones Cup from July 12 to 21 in Chinese-Taipei. Charles Tiu returned to lead the coaching staff and his mentor, former Gilas Pilipinas head coach, Rajko Toroman was the lead assistant. It was also announced that Jeremiah Gray, Roosevelt Adams, Aaron Black, 2019 MPBL Datu Cup MVP Gab Banal, Jason Brickman and Joseph Yeo would suit up for the team.

Mighty Sports captured their second Jones Cup title after defeating Taiwan-A, 83-76 for a 7–0 record. They then swept the competition after with an 8–0 record.

=== Merlion Cup ===
Singapore's Merlion Cup Tournament was revived in 2016 and the Mighty Sports were invited as the Philippines' representative. They beat the Seoul Samsung Thunders on their opening match. They advanced into the semifinals round after beating Westports Malaysia Dragons, and eventually won against Singapore Slingers. They advanced in the finals and faced Shanghai Sharks in which they suffered a defeat, placing them in second after Jimmer Fredette scored three freethrows with no time left on the clock.

=== Dubai International Basketball Tournament ===
==== 2017 ====
Mighty Sports joined the 2017 Dubai International Basketball Championship with only a couple of weeks to prepare. The tournament took place from February 18 to 25, 2017.

Mighty Sports was led by NBA veterans Hasheem Thabeet, Dominic McGuire, Justin Brownlee and naturalized player Marcus Douthit. Chris Tiu and center Beau Belga bannered the local cast along with other PBA veterans JC Intal, Gary David, Ryan Araña and two-time PBA MVP Willie Miller who were added in the team's lineup. Amateur standouts Kiefer Ravena, Jeron Teng and Jett Manuel were also added in the team's roster.

Due to the lack of cohesion and team chemistry, they lost to host team Al Ahli, 83-75 in the opening day. In their second game, they lost to the Egypt national basketball team, 84–82, after Ravena's three point attempt, in the last 6 seconds of the game, failed. The day after, they also lost in a close game to Lebanese powerhouse Sagesse 95–92. The team managed to beat Ball Above All with a score of 94–80 to end their stint in the tournament with a single win.

==== 2019 ====
Mighty Sports participated in the Dubai tournament in February 2019 with SMDC, Oriental Group, Healthcube and Go for Gold as the team's main sponsors.

For their 2019 Dubai stint, the team hired the services of former NBA two-time champion Lamar Odom, Ginebra resident import Justin Brownlee, and Chinese Basketball Association import Randolph Morris. Notable local signings include former Ginebra guard Jett Manuel, University of the Philippines playmaker Juan Gomez de Liano, Gabriel Banal, Joseph Yeo, La Salle forward Santi Santillan, De La Salle-College of St. Benilde high flyer Justin Gutang and Mono Vampire guard Jason Brickman.

The team also signed Fil-Am prospects Jeremiah Gray and Roosevelt Adams followed by National University big man Troy Rike to complete the lineup.

Mighty Sports finished third winning over the Homenetmen Lebanon in the third-place play off. They only lost once, to Lebanese club Al Riyadi in the semifinal.

==== 2020 ====
Mighty Sports made their third appearance at the Dubai International Basketball Championship in 2020. They became the first team based outside the Middle East to win the tournament when they won 92–81 over Al Riyadi Beirut in the final. Mighty Sports player Renaldo Balkman was named the tournament's Most Valuable Player.

==== 2023 ====
For the 2023 Dubai International Basketball Championship, Mighty Sport itself would not be returning. Instead Strong Group Realty of Jacob Lao, which Mighty and Acto City sponsored, competed in their stead. Strong Group, also coached by Charles Tiu, failed to repeat Mighty's feat, and finished as quarterfinalists.

== Partnerships ==
Mighty Sports had a partnership with the Bulacan Kuyas of the Maharlika Pilipinas Basketball League (MPBL) in the 2018 MPBL Datu Cup as the team's corporate sponsor. In 2023, Mighty Sport sponsored Strong Group Realty's team which entered the 2023 Dubai International Basketball Championship.

== Brand image ==
The sportswear manufacturing company behind Mighty Sports adopted its logo in July 2019 which is also used by its sports teams. It consist of an "M" with a three-pronged crown.

== Roster ==
=== 2020 Dubai International Basketball Championship ===
The following is the 12-man roster of the Mighty Sports-Go for Gold for the 2020 Dubai International Basketball Championship.

Mighty Sports-Philippines - 2020 Dubai International Basketball Championship roster
Players
Coaches

Pos.	No.	Nat.	Name	Ht.	Wt.	Age
C	1	(United States) (Philippines)	Blatche, Andray	2.10 m (6 ft 11 in)		40 – 22 August 1986
PF	7	(Puerto Rico)	Balkman, Renaldo (I)	2.01 m (6 ft 7 in)		42 – 14 July 1984
SG	94	(United States)	Moore, McKenzie (I)	1.98 m (6 ft 6 in)		34 – 11 May 1992
G	10	(United States)	Williams, Mikey	1.88 m (6 ft 2 in)		34 – 27 October 1991
SF	13	(Philippines)	Malonzo, Jamie	2.01 m (6 ft 7 in)		30 – 31 July 1996
SG	22	(United States) (Philippines)	Kendrick, Jelan	1.98 m (6 ft 6 in)		35 – 9 October 1991
SG	2	(United States) (Philippines)	Gray, Jeremiah	1.93 m (6 ft 4 in)		27 – 18 November 1998
SF	0	(United States) (Philippines)	Adams, Roosevelt	1.95 m (6 ft 5 in)		28 – 13 July 1998
SG	18	(Philippines)	Yeo, Joseph	1.85 m (6 ft 1 in)		43 – 7 September 1983
C	55	(Senegal)	N'Diaye, Hamady (I)	2.13 m (7 ft 0 in)		39 – 12 January 1987
PF	45	(United States) (Philippines)	Rike, Troy	2.01 m (6 ft 7 in)		31 – 10 May 1995
PG	5	(United States) (Philippines)	Brickman, Jason	1.80 m (5 ft 11 in)		34 – 19 November 1991

Head coach

- (Philippines) Charles Tiu

Assistant coaches

- (United States) Will Voigt
- (Philippines) Dean Castaño
- (Philippines) Tyrone Tang
- (Philippines) Paolo Layug

Team manager

- (Philippines) Wowie Evangelista

Legend

- (C) Team captain
- (I) Import
- Nat. – Flags indicate national team
  eligibility at FIBA sanctioned events
- Age – describes age
  on January 9, 2019

=== Past ===
2019 William Jones Cup

The following is the 12-man roster of the Mighty Sports-Go for Gold for the 2019 William Jones Cup.

Mighty Sports-Philippines - 2019 William Jones Cup roster
Players
Coaches

Pos.	No.	Nat.	Name	Ht.	Wt.	Age
PF	7	(Puerto Rico)	Balkman, Renaldo (I)	2.01 m (6 ft 7 in)		42 – 14 July 1984
SF	32	(United States)	Graham, Zach (I)	1.96 m (6 ft 5 in)		37 – 28 March 1989
F	6	(United States)	Phelps, Eugene (I)	1.98 m (6 ft 6 in)		36 – 23 January 1990
SF	77	(Philippines)	Banal, Gabriel	1.91 m (6 ft 3 in)		36 – 1 September 1990
SG	2	(United States) (Philippines)	Gray, Jeremiah	1.93 m (6 ft 4 in)		27 – 18 November 1998
SF	0	(United States) (Philippines)	Adams, Roosevelt	1.96 m (6 ft 5 in)		28 – 13 July 1998
SG	18	(Philippines)	Yeo, Joseph	1.85 m (6 ft 1 in)		43 – 7 September 1983
PG	8	(United States) (Philippines)	Black, Aaron	1.85 m (6 ft 1 in)		29 – 3 December 1996
C	55	(Senegal)	N'Diaye, Hamady (I)	2.13 m (7 ft 0 in)		39 – 12 January 1987
SG	94	(United States)	Moore, McKenzie (I)	1.98 m (6 ft 6 in)		34 – 11 May 1992
PF	45	(United States) (Philippines)	Rike, Troy	2.01 m (6 ft 7 in)		31 – 10 May 1995
PG	8	(Philippines)	Wongchuking Jr., Caesar	1.80 m (5 ft 11 in)		34 – 1 April 1992
PG	5	(United States) (Philippines)	Brickman, Jason	1.80 m (5 ft 11 in)		34 – 19 November 1991

Head coach

- (Philippines) Charles Tiu

Assistant coaches

- (Philippines) Woody Co
- (Philippines) Dean Castaño

Team manager

- (Philippines) Wowie Evangelista

Legend

- (C) Team captain
- (I) Import
- Nat. – Flags indicate national team
  eligibility at FIBA sanctioned events
- Age – describes age
  on January 9, 2019

2017 Dubai International Basketball Tournament

The following was the 14-man roster of the PH-Mighty Sports for the 2017 Dubai International Basketball Tournament.

Mighty Sports PH - 2017 Dubai International Basketball Tournament roster
Players
Coaches

Pos.	No.	Nat.	Name	Ht.	Wt.	Age
G	6	(Philippines)	Manuel, Jett	1.88 m (6 ft 2 in)		34 – 22 September 1992
G	1	(Philippines)	Ravena, Kiefer	1.83 m (6 ft 0 in)		32 – 27 October 1993
G	18	(Philippines)	Araña, Ryan	1.88 m (6 ft 2 in)		42 – 23 March 1984
PG	13	(Philippines)	Miller, Willie	1.80 m (5 ft 11 in)		49 – 13 July 1977
F	77	(Philippines)	Banal, Gabriel	1.91 m (6 ft 3 in)		36 – 1 September 1990
G	7	(Philippines)	Intal, JC	1.93 m (6 ft 4 in)		42 – 18 November 1983
G	20	(Philippines)	David, Gary	1.88 m (6 ft 2 in)		48 – 13 July 1978
PG	17	(Philippines)	Tiu, Chris	1.80 m (5 ft 11 in)		41 – 15 July 1985
F	30	(Philippines)	Belga, Beau	1.96 m (6 ft 5 in)		39 – 30 November 1986
G	21	(Philippines)	Teng, Jeron	1.88 m (6 ft 2 in)		32 – 21 March 1994
C	11	(United States) (Philippines)	Douthit, Marcus	2.11 m (6 ft 11 in)		46 – 15 April 1980
F	5	(United States)	McGuire, Dominic (I)	2.06 m (6 ft 9 in)		40 – 20 October 1985
F	32	(United States)	Brownlee, Justin (I)	2.01 m (6 ft 7 in)		38 – 23 April 1988
C	34	(Tanzania)	Thabeet, Hasheem (I)	2.21 m (7 ft 3 in)		39 – 16 February 1987

Head coach

- (Philippines) Charles Tiu

Assistant coach

- (Philippines) Sandy Arespacochaga
- (Philippines) Moriah Gingerich
- (Philippines) Mike Fermin

Team manager

- (Philippines) Jean Michael Alabanza

Legend

- (C) Team captain
- (I) Import
- Nat. – Flags indicate national team
  eligibility at FIBA sanctioned events
- Age – describes age
  on February 18, 2017

2016 Merlion Cup

The following was the 14-man roster of the PH-Mighty Sports for the 2016 Merlion Cup.

Mighty Sports PH - 2016 Merlion Cup roster
Players
Coaches

Pos.	No.	Nat.	Name	Ht.	Wt.	Age
G	8	(Philippines)	Yeo, Joseph	1.85 m (6 ft 1 in)		43 – 7 September 1983
PG	30	(Philippines)	Ravena, Kiefer	1.83 m (6 ft 0 in)		32 – 27 October 1993
G	4	(Philippines)	Alolino, Gelo	1.83 m (6 ft 0 in)		32 – 4 January 1994
G	1	(Philippines)	Banal, Raphael	1.88 m (6 ft 2 in)		34 – 28 January 1992
F	77	(Philippines)	Banal, Gabriel	1.91 m (6 ft 3 in)		36 – 1 September 1990
PG	11	(Philippines)	Tang, Tyrone	1.70 m (5 ft 7 in)		42 – 25 September 1984
G	8	(Philippines)	Ferrer, Edrick (C)	1.78 m (5 ft 10 in)		49 – 5 November 1976
PG	5	(United States) (Philippines)	Brickman, Jason	1.83 m (6 ft 0 in)		34 – 19 November 1991
C	15	(United States) (Philippines)	Douthit, Marcus	2.11 m (6 ft 11 in)		46 – 15 April 1980
F	10	(United States) (Philippines)	Deutchman, Jason	1.98 m (6 ft 6 in)		40 – 27 September 1986
G	7	(Canada) (Philippines)	Wright, Matthew	1.93 m (6 ft 4 in)		35 – 7 February 1991
F	14	(United States)	Thornton, Al (I)	2.03 m (6 ft 8 in)		42 – 7 December 1983
G	3	(United States)	Spencer, Dewarick (I)	1.93 m (6 ft 4 in)		44 – 4 May 1982
C	55	(Senegal)	N'diaye, Hamady (I)	2.13 m (7 ft 0 in)		39 – 12 January 1987

Head coach

- (Philippines) Charles Tiu

Assistant coach

- (Philippines) Dominic Uy
- (Philippines) Moriah Gingerich

Team manager

- (Philippines) Jean Michael Alabanza

Legend

- (C) Team captain
- (I) Import
- Nat. – Flags indicate national team
  eligibility at FIBA sanctioned events
- Age – describes age
  on September 21, 2016

=== Depth chart ===
Pos.	Starting 5	Bench 1	Bench 2	Bench 3
C	Hamady N'diaye	Marcus Douthit
PF	Alford Thornton	Jason Deutchman
SF	Dewarick Spencer	Gabriel Banal
SG	Matthew Wright	Joseph Yeo	Raphael Banal	Edrick Ferrer
PG	Jason Brickman	Kiefer Ravena	Gelo Alolino	Tyrone Tang

2016 William Jones Cup

The following was the 14-man roster of the Philippine Mighty Sports for the 2016 William Jones Cup.

Mighty Sports PH - 2016 William Jones Cup roster
Players
Coaches

Pos.	No.	Nat.	Name	Ht.	Wt.	Age
F	17	(Philippines)	Rodriguez, Larry	1.93 m (6 ft 4 in)		43 – 5 May 1983
G	16	(Philippines)	Teng, Jeric	1.88 m (6 ft 2 in)		35 – 18 March 1991
G/F	80	(Philippines)	Salvacion, Sunday	1.91 m (6 ft 3 in)		47 – 17 December 1978
F	18	(Philippines)	Avenido, Leo	1.89 m (6 ft 2 in)		48 – 25 September 1978
PG	11	(Philippines)	Tang, Tyrone	1.70 m (5 ft 7 in)		42 – 25 September 1984
G	8	(Philippines)	Ferrer, Edrick (C)	1.78 m (5 ft 10 in)		49 – 5 November 1976
PG	5	(Philippines) (United States)	Brickman, Jason	1.83 m (6 ft 0 in)		34 – 19 November 1991
F	14	(United States)	Thornton, Al (I)	2.03 m (6 ft 8 in)		42 – 7 December 1983
G	3	(United States)	Spencer, Dewarick (I)	1.93 m (6 ft 4 in)		44 – 4 May 1982
G/F	32	(United States)	Graham, Zach (I)	1.96 m (6 ft 5 in)		37 – 28 March 1989
F	7	(United States)	Singletary, Mike (I)	1.96 m (6 ft 5 in)		38 – 19 September 1988
C	33	(United States)	Gillenwater, Troy (I)	2.05 m (6 ft 9 in)		37 – 19 December 1988
F/C	22	(United States)	Macklin, Vernon (I)	2.08 m (6 ft 10 in)		40 – 25 September 1986
C	55	(Senegal)	N'diaye, Hamady (I)	2.13 m (7 ft 0 in)		39 – 12 January 1987

Head coach

- (Philippines) Bo Perasol

Assistant coach(es)

- (Philippines) Charles Tiu
- (Philippines) Mike Fermin

Team manager

- (Philippines) Jean Michael Alabanza

== Honors ==
=== Domestic ===
- Republica Cup

Winners (4): 2013, 2014, 2016, 2018

- Pilipinas Commercial Basketball League

Runner-up (1): 2016 Chairman's Cup

=== International Invitational ===
- William Jones Cup

Winners (2): 2016, 2019

- Merlion Cup

Runners-up (1): 2016

== Notable players ==
Name	Nationality	Highlight(s)
Renaldo Balkman	(Puerto Rico)	2006: NBA draft / Round: 1 / Pick: 20th overall Selected by the New York Knicks; 2019: Champion - William Jones Cup; 2020: Champion - Dubai International Basketball Tournament
Hamady N'Diaye	(Senegal)	2010: NBA draft / Round: 2 / Pick: 56th overall Selected by the Minnesota Timberwolves; 2016: Champion - William Jones Cup; 2016: 2nd place - Merlion Cup; 2019: Champion - William Jones Cup
Hasheem Thabeet	(Tanzania)	2009: NBA draft / Round: 1 / Pick: 2nd overall Selected by the Memphis Grizzlies
Al Thornton	(United States)	2007: NBA draft / Round: 1 / Pick: 14th overall Selected by the Los Angeles Clippers; 2016: Champion - William Jones Cup; 2016: 2nd place - Merlion Cup
Vernon Macklin	(United States)	2011: NBA draft / Round: 2 / Pick: 52nd overall Selected by the Detroit Pistons; 2016: Champion - William Jones Cup
Dominic McGuire	(United States)	2007: NBA draft / Round: 2 / Pick: 47th overall Selected by the Washington Wizards
Lamar Odom	(United States)	1999: NBA draft / Round: 1 / Pick: 4th overall Selected by the Los Angeles Clippers; 2019: 3rd place - Dubai International Basketball Tournament
Justin Brownlee	(United States)	2019: 3rd place - Dubai International Basketball Tournament
Marcus Douthit	(United States) (Philippines)	2016: 2nd place - Merlion Cup
Andray Blatche	(United States) (Philippines)	2005: NBA draft / Round: 2 / Pick: 49th overall Selected by the Washington Wizards; 2020: Champion - Dubai International Basketball Tournament

== See also ==
Strong Group Athletics
