= 2017 Merlion Cup (basketball) =

Tournament information
- Location: Kallang
- Dates: 20–24 September
- Host(s): Singapore
- Venue(s): 1
- Teams: 7
- Website: 2017 Merlion Cup

Final positions
- Champions: (Australia) Adelaide 36ers
- 1st runners-up: (China) Shanghai Sharks
- 2nd runners-up: (South Korea) Jeonju KCC Egis

Tournament statistics
- Matches played: 15

The 2017 Merlion Cup was the 11th edition of the Merlion Cup, an invitational club basketball tournament organized by the Basketball Association of Singapore.

The Adelaide 36ers from Australia won the title by defeating the defending champions Shanghai Sharks from China, 101-81, for their maiden championship, and the second for Australia, with Melbourne Tigers winning it in 1994.

== Participating teams ==
- Singapore Slingers
- (Chinese Taipei) Yulon Luxgen Dinos
- (China) Shanghai Sharks
- (Philippines) NLEX-SCTEX Road Warriors
- (South Korea) Jeonju KCC Egis
- (Indonesia) Satria Muda Pertamina
- (Australia) Adelaide 36ers

== Results ==
=== Group stage ===
==== Group A ====
Pos	Team	Pld	W	L	PF	PA	PD	Pts	Qualification
1	(South Korea) Jeonju KCC Egis	1	1	0	99	79	+20	2	Advance to Semifinals
2	(China) Shanghai Sharks	1	1	0	81	69	+12	2	Advance to Semifinals
3	(Indonesia) Satria Muda Pertamina	1	0	1	69	81	−12	1	Advance to 5th-7th Classification
4	(Philippines) NLEX-SCTEX Road Warriors	1	0	1	79	99	−20	1	Advance to 5th-7th Classification

Source: Teams

20 September
16:30

Report

Shanghai Sharks (China)	81–69	(Indonesia) Satria Muda Pertamina
Scoring by quarter: 17–20, 13–19, 30–15, 21–15
Pts: Luo H.C. 27; Rebs: Tseng 11; Asts: Tseng 5		Pts: Taggart 25; Rebs: Taggart 14; Asts: Jacobs 5

OCBC Arena, Kallang, Singapore
Referees: Leong Chuen Wing (SGP), Steve Goh (SGP), Allan Cheong (SGP)

20 September
20:30

Report

NLEX-SCTEX Road Warriors (Philippines)	79–99	(South Korea) Jeonju KCC Egis
Scoring by quarter: 21–15, 17–24, 20–16, 36–17
Pts: Perkins 25; Rebs: Perkins 9 Asts: Raymundo 4		Pts: Emmett 18; Rebs: Ha S.J. 9 Asts: Chon T.P. 5

OCBC Arena, Kallang, Singapore
Referees: Ng Yui-wai (TPE), Wong Hwee Liak (SGP), Meo Kok Eng (SGP)

=== Final round ===
==== 5th-7th Classification ====
23 September
14:00

Report

NLEX-SCTEX Road Warriors (Philippines)	81–76	(Chinese Taipei) Yulon Luxgen Dinos
Scoring by quarter: 19–8, 21–19, 13–24, 28–25
Pts: Perkins 28; Rebs: Perkins 13; Asts: Perkins 4		Pts: Lu K.L. 21; Rebs: Davis 15; Asts: Davis 4

OCBC Arena, Kallang, Singapore
Referees: Meo Kok Eng (SGP), Richard Sim (SGP), Benjamin Mok (SGP)

==== Semifinals ====
23 September
16:00

Report

Shanghai Sharks (China)	73–67	Singapore Slingers
Scoring by quarter: 18–16, 18–17, 21–21, 16–13
Pts: Minnerath 14; Rebs: Minnerath 7 Asts: Luo H.C., Shi Y.C. 4		Pts: Alexander 26; Rebs: Alexander 9 Asts: Alexander 4

OCBC Arena, Kallang, Singapore
Referees: Wichaiphin Suebpong (THA), Tee Yong Sern (MAS), Ng Yui-wai (TPE)

23 September
18:00

Report

Adelaide 36ers (Australia)	94–72	(South Korea) Jeonju KCC Egis
Scoring by quarter: 21–15, 17–24, 20–16, 36–17
Pts: Creek 27; Rebs: Creek 11; Asts: Sobey 5		Pts: Song K.C. 17; Rebs: Ha S.J. 5 Asts: Lee H.M. 5

OCBC Arena, Kallang, Singapore
Referees: Yuen Chun Yip (HKG), Leong Chuen Wing (SGP), Wong Hwee Liak (SGP)

==== 5th-7th Classification ====
24 September
13:00

Report

Yulon Luxgen Dinos (Chinese Taipei)	88–85	(Indonesia) Satria Muda Pertamina
Scoring by quarter: 20–23, 20–13, 25–25, 23–24
Pts: Lu C.J. 19; Rebs: Davis 12; Asts: Davis 7		Pts: Taggart 33; Rebs: Taggart 12; Asts: Jacobs, Taggart 4

OCBC Arena, Kallang, Singapore
Referees: Goh Poh Seng (SGP), Chee Chee Keong (SGP), Ong Jin Leong (SGP)

==== Third place game ====
24 September
15:00

Report

Singapore Slingers	68–78	(South Korea) Jeonju KCC Egis
Scoring by quarter: 12–19, 19–20, 19–20, 18–19
Pts: Alexander 22; Rebs: Wright 13; Asts: Wright 4		Pts: Rhodes, Kim J.H., Park K.S. 18; Rebs: Park S.J. 5 Asts: Park K.S., Song C.Y., Kim M.G. 4

OCBC Arena, Kallang, Singapore
Referees: Tee Yong Sern (MAS), Wichaiphin Suebpong (THA), Ng Yui-wai (TPE)

==== Final ====
24 September
17:00

Report

Shanghai Sharks (China)	81–101	(Australia) Adelaide 36ers
Scoring by quarter: 16–24, 21–23, 26–24, 18–30
Pts: Minnerath 28; Rebs: Minnerath 8 Asts: Cai, Luo, Shi Y.C. 5		Pts: Creek 21; Rebs: Hodgson, Creek 7 Asts: Sobey 9

OCBC Arena, Kallang, Singapore
Referees: Yuen Chun Yip (HKG), Leong Chuen Wing (SGP), Wong Hwee Liak (SGP)

== Final standing ==
Rank	Team
1st place, gold medalist(s)	(Australia) Adelaide 36ers
2nd place, silver medalist(s)	(China) Shanghai Sharks
3rd place, bronze medalist(s)	(South Korea) Jeonju KCC Egis
4	(Philippines) NLEX-SCTEX Road Warriors
5	Singapore Slingers
6	(Indonesia) Satria Muda Pertamina
7	(Chinese Taipei) Yulon Luxgen Dinos

2017 Merlion Cup champions
(Australia)
Adelaide 36ers
First title
