= Merlion Cup (basketball) =

International basketball tournament

- Current season, competition or edition: 2017 Merlion Cup (basketball)
- Logo used since 2016
- Sport: Basketball
- First season: 1984
- Country: Singapore
- Most recent champions: (Australia) Adelaide 36ers (1st title)
- Most titles: (Soviet Union) USSR Spartak; China (2 titles each)

The Merlion Cup is an international basketball tournament, in which clubs, national teams and selections take part. It is organised by the Basketball Association of Singapore.

== History ==
The inaugural Merlion Cup was hosted in 1984 with the Chinese national team winning over Spanish team Madrid Estudiantes. The tournament was held next year but the 1986 edition was cancelled due to sponsorship issues amidst a recession.

The tournament was resumed in 1987 and was held annually until the 1996 with the 1993 edition not held due to the 1993 Southeast Asian Games and the 1995 edition being cancelled.

The Gay World Stadium later renamed as the Geyland Indoor Stadium has been used as the venue of the tournament from the inaugural until the 1987 tournament. From the 1989 until the 1996 edition the Singapore Indoor Stadium was used as the venue of the basketball meet.

The Merlion Cup was not to be held again until 2016 when the BAS decided to revive the tournament. Two more editions in two years is planned by BAS citing the success of the 2016 edition attributing healthy attendances throughout the competition.

== Results ==
Year	Host	Final			Third place Game		
Year	Host	Champion	Score	Second place	Third place	Score	Fourth place
1984; Details	Geylang	China	71–70	(Spain); Madrid Estudiantes	(Soviet Union); Georgia USSR	82–73	(Australia); Mazda Cannons
1985; Details	Geylang	(Soviet Union); USSR Spartak	75–70	China	?		
1987; Details	Geylang	(Soviet Union); USSR Spartak	?	(West Germany); Steiner-Optik Bayreuth	? ( China Army or KK Smelt Olimpija)		
1988; Details	Geylang	(United States); Brewster Heights Packing	?	China Olympic	?		
1989; Details	Kallang	(Soviet Union); Kiev Stroitel	84–81	China	(United States); University of Nevada alumni	82–77	(Australia); Gold Coast Cougars
1991; Details	Kallang	China	90–74	(Soviet Union); USSR Spartak	? ( Kiev IPS Budivelnik or World Basketball League All-Stars)		
1992; Details	Kallang	(Hong Kong); Fajing	96–76	(China); Shanghai	?		
1994; Details	Kallang	(Australia); Melbourne Tigers	?	(Hong Kong); Frankwell	?		
1996; Details	Kallang	(Indonesia); Aspac Texmaco	88–84	China	?		
2016; Details	Kallang	(China); Shanghai Sharks	78–77	(Philippines); Mighty Sports	(South Korea); Seoul Samsung Thunders	94–55	Singapore Slingers
2017; Details	Kallang	(Australia); Adelaide 36ers	101–81	(China); Shanghai Sharks	(South Korea); Jeonju KCC Egis	78–68	Singapore Slingers

== Medal tally ==
=== By country ===
Country	Gold	Silver	Total (Note: Does not include bronze medal results due to lack of data)
China	3	6	9
Soviet Union	3	1	4
Australia	2	0	2
Hong Kong	1	1	3
Indonesia	1	0	1
United States	1	0	1
Philippines	0	1	1
Spain	0	1	1
West Germany	0	1	1

== See also ==
- William Jones Cup
- Merlion Cup
- FIBA Intercontinental Cup
