= Mighty Sports Apparel =

- Industry: Manufacturing, Textile
- Founded: 2011
- Founder: Caesar Wongchuking
- Headquarters: Guiguinto, Bulacan, Philippines
- Key people: Caesar Angelo Wongchuking (President) Ian Opeña (Apparel Manager)
- Products: Sportswear
- Website: www.mightysportsapparel.ph

Mighty Sports Apparel and Accessories, Inc. (MSAA) is a Philippine sportswear manufacturing company headquartered in Guiguinto, Bulacan. The company makes a wide range of customized and ready-to-wear apparel and accessories for numerous types of sports. They are also the official supplier of top colleges and universities in the Philippines such as Xavier School, Ateneo de Manila University, University of the Philippines and De La Salle-College of St. Benilde. It is owned by businessman Caesar Wongchuking.

The sportswear maker also owns the Mighty Sports basketball team that participates in various domestic and international tournaments such as the Pilipinas Commercial Basketball League, William Jones Cup and most recently, Dubai International Basketball Championship that featured former Los Angeles Lakers star Lamar Odom and Ginebra import Justin Brownlee.

In June 2019, Mighty Sports Apparel and Accessories introduced their newly redesigned logo featuring a simplified three-pronged crown representing their core businesses of customized sportswear, ready-to-wear goods, and sports teams.

== Partnerships ==
The sportswear manufacturer is currently an official merchandise partner of the Ateneo de Manila University and De La Salle-College of St. Benilde. The company was previously the official outfitter of the UP Fighting Maroons Men's Basketball Team. They had a corporate sponsorship with the Bulacan Kuyas (dubbed "Bulacan Kuyas-Mighty Sports") in the Maharlika Pilipinas Basketball League that lasted for only one season.

MSAA is also the apparel and gear manufacturer for Xavier School including varsity team uniforms, PE uniforms and official merchandise. In August 2018, MSAA entered a joint-venture with Xavier School to publish a coffee table book entitled Golden: A Celebration of the Xavier Golden Stallions commemorating the achievements of athletes of Xavier School over the past few decades.

The firm has also sponsored sports organizations and individuals, mostly involving junior, "differently-abled" or any Philippine representative athletes. For example, they sponsored two of Manila's top junior golfers in 2015 and most recently, donated all of Mighty Sports basketball team's Republica Cup 2018 prize money to boost the Paralympic Committee of the Philippines athletes.

In July 2019, Samahang Basketbol ng Pilipinas embarked on a partnership with Mighty Sports Apparel and Accessories to become the official merchandiser and outfitter of the Gilas Pilipinas national basketball team. Under the agreement, Mighty Sports will produce and sell merchandise promoting the Gilas Pilipinas brand.
