= 2016 Merlion Cup (basketball) =

Singaporean basketball tournament

Tournament information
- Location: Kallang
- Dates: 21–25 September
- Host: Singapore
- Venue: 1
- Teams: 6
- Website: http://www.bas.org.sg/

Final positions
- Champions: (China) Shanghai Sharks
- 1st runners-up: (Philippines) Mighty Sports
- 2nd runners-up: (South Korea) Seoul Samsung Thunders

Tournament statistics
- Matches played: 11

The 2016 Merlion Cup has been the 10th edition of the Merlion Cup, an invitational club basketball tournament organized by the Basketball Association of Singapore. The 2016 edition marked the return of the tournament which was held two decades before in 1996.

The tournament took place at the OCBC Arena from 21–25 September and featured six teams from six countries.

== Participating teams ==
Six teams participated at the 2016 Merlion Cup.

- Singapore Slingers
- (Chinese Taipei) Kinmen Kaoliang Liquor
- (China) Shanghai Sharks
- (Philippines) Mighty Sports
- (South Korea) Seoul Samsung Thunders
- Westports Malaysia Dragons

== Results ==
=== Group stage ===
Source: Basketball Association of Singapore

==== Group A ====
Team	Pld	W	L	PF	PA	PD	Pts
(China) Shanghai Sharks	2	2	0	173	110	+63	4
Singapore Slingers	2	1	1	146	160	−14	3
(Chinese Taipei) Kinmen Kaoliang Liquor	2	0	2	114	163	−49	2

21 September
18:30

Report

Kinmen Kaoliang Liquor (Chinese Taipei)	71–79	Singapore Slingers
Pts: Melvin 26		Pts: Alexander 21

OCBC Arena, Kallang, Singapore

22 September
20:30

Report

Shanghai Sharks (China)	84–43	(Chinese Taipei) Kinmen Kaoliang Liquor

OCBC Arena, Kallang, Singapore

23 September
20:30

Report

Singapore Slingers	67–89	(China) Shanghai Sharks

OCBC Arena, Kallang, Singapore

==== Group B ====
Team	Pld	W	L	PF	PA	PD	Pts
(Philippines) Mighty Sports	2	2	0	197	165	+32	4
(South Korea) Seoul Samsung Thunders	2	1	1	186	162	+24	3
Westports Malaysia Dragons	2	0	2	148	204	−56	2

21 September
20:30

Report

Seoul Samsung Thunders (South Korea)	87–92	(Philippines) Mighty Sports
Scoring by quarter: 28–21, 17–23, 20–22, 22–26
		Pts: Thornton 34

OCBC Arena, Kallang, Singapore
Referees: Ozawa Tsutomu, Hu Ji, Leong Chuen Wing

21 September
18:30

Report

Westports Malaysia Dragons	70–99	(South Korea) Seoul Samsung Thunders
Pts: Wright 37		Pts: Craig 25

OCBC Arena, Kallang, Singapore

23 September
18:30

Report

Mighty Sports (Philippines)	105–78	Westports Malaysia Dragons
Scoring by quarter: 24–19, 29–16, 24–16, 28–27

OCBC Arena, Kallang, Singapore

=== Final round ===
Semi-finals
24 September -
(China) Shanghai Sharks	76
(South Korea) Seoul Samsung Thunders	70
24 September -
(Philippines) Mighty Sports	72
Singapore Slingers	70

Final
25 September -
(China) Shanghai Sharks	78
(Philippines) Mighty Sports	77
Third place
25 September -
(South Korea) Seoul Samsung Thunders	94
Singapore Slingers	55

5th place
25 September -
(Chinese Taipei) Kinmen Kaoliang Liquor
Westports Malaysia Dragons

==== Semifinals ====
24 September
18:30

Shanghai Sharks (China)	76–70	(South Korea) Seoul Samsung Thunders

OCBC Arena, Kallang, Singapore

24 September
20:30

Report

Mighty Sports (Philippines)	72–70	Singapore Slingers
Pts: Spencer 31		Pts: Howard 24

OCBC Arena, Kallang, Singapore

==== Fifth place game ====
25 September
13:00

Report

Kinmen Kaoliang Liquor (Chinese Taipei)	84–76	Westports Malaysia Dragons
Pts: Wong Y.H. 20		Pts: Wright 28

OCBC Arena, Kallang, Singapore

==== Third place game ====
25 September
15:30

Report

Seoul Samsung Thunders (South Korea)	94–55	Singapore Slingers
		Pts: Alexander 22

OCBC Arena, Kallang, Singapore

==== Final ====
25 September
18:00

Report

Shanghai Sharks (China)	78–77	(Philippines) Mighty Sports
Pts: Fredette 41		Pts: Thornton 36

OCBC Arena, Kallang, Singapore
Attendance: 3,000

== Final standing ==
Rank	Team
1st place, gold medalist(s)	(China) Shanghai Sharks
2nd place, silver medalist(s)	(Philippines) Mighty Sports
3rd place, bronze medalist(s)	(South Korea) Seoul Samsung Thunders
4	Singapore Slingers
5	(Chinese Taipei) Kinmen Kaoliang Liquor
6	Westports Malaysia Dragons

2016 Merlion Cup champions
(China)
Shanghai Sharks
First title
