= Cheryl Tiu =

Chinese-Filipino journalist and media personality

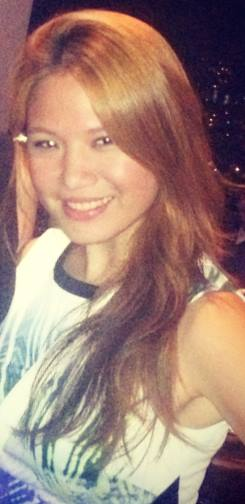
- Photo of Tiu taken in 2014
- Education: Ateneo de Manila University
- Occupations: Publisher, Editor, Book Author, Blogger, Jewelry Designer
- Parent(s): Jerry Chua Tiu (father); Lianne Alandy Dy Tiu (mother)
- Relatives: Chris Tiu (brother); Charles Tiu (brother); Christine Tiu (sister); Christian Tiu (brother)
- Website: The Personal Blog of Cheryl Tiu

Cheryl Tiu (simplified Chinese: 张美铃; traditional Chinese: 張美鈴; pinyin: Zhang Meiling; Pe̍h-ōe-jī: Tiuⁿ Bílêng) is a Chinese-Filipino international journalist and a media personality based in Manila, Philippines.

Tiu maintains a regular weekly column for the Philippine Star called “In Between Deadlines,” where she writes mostly about food and travel. She also has column at Forbes USA (Forbes.com) titled "Miss Adventures", where she also writes about the same subjects. In addition, she is a writer for CNN Travel, the destination portal of CNN International. Aside from the aforementioned, Tiu maintains a personal blog, The Personal Blog of Cheryl Tiu. (www.cheryltiu.com), where she chronicles her personal adventures and often funny escapades. She is also an Tastemaker for the World's 50 Best Restaurants.

Previously, she worked at the Philippines’ luxury lifestyle magazine Lifestyle Asia, under One Mega Group, for 12 years, with positions of deputy editor/ editor at large and publisher, and was responsible for maintaining the magazine's status as the No. 1 luxury magazine in the country, and for organizing the Royal Gala with the Queen Mother of Bhutan, among many other successful events.

Tiu was also invited to come on board as a judge on Mediacorp's newest show "Eat List Star," along with hotelier Loh Lik Peng, Tippling Club owner/ chef Ryan Clift, Thai-American actor and host Uttsada Panichkul and radio DJ and TV host Simone Heng. Filming was completed in Singapore in March 2016 and episodes are currently running on the Channel News Asia and Lifestyle Toggle websites.

== Education ==
Tiu is a graduate of the B.S. Communications Technology Management course at the Ateneo de Manila University in Quezon City, Philippines. While there, she entered the exchange student program and studied at the business school École supérieure des sciences commerciales d'Angers in the Budapest, Hungary campus and the Angers, France campus for a semester each. She also enrolled at Columbia University's Graduate School of Journalism for a six-week, post-graduate publishing course.

== Career ==
As a special guest host of CNN International’s CNNGo: Manila, which aired in 2012, she proudly featured the Philippines’ Taal Volcano on global television, a stint that marked her broadcasting debut.

Tiu is also a book author, having penned the first ever Wallpaper* City Guide of Manila, published by UK-based Phaidon Press. The book launch occurred shortly before Manila was nominated "Best City" in the Wallpaper* Design Awards 2015.

She was a member of the board of judges of the 2014 Asia-Pacific Stevie Awards. She was also part of the Board of Judges for the 2015 Katha Awards for Manila FAME (Furnishings and Apparel Manufacturers' Exchange) for Furniture and Design, and Food.

Tiu has designed a jewelry line for Denovo Diamonds. Her first suite of studio multiples was inspired by her travels and was titled “Global Collection.”

Tiu was chosen as one of the few "Women of Allure 2013" by the Philippine Star.

She has been tapped by various luxury brands. She was a muse for the first Hermes Silk Ball in the Philippines; a brand ambassador for French heritage jacket brand K-Way and Brazilian footwear brand Melissa; influencer for Globe Telecoms Platinum Tattoo and Singapore Tourism Board; an icon for Guerlain's Kiss Kiss lipstick range; as well as muse for several fashion designers.

In September 2015, Tiu founded Cross Cultures, an events platform that promotes the exchange of culture through food. She brought Ethiopian cuisine to Manila by way of Eat Ethio for her first event. Her second one spotlighted Indian cuisine by way of Gaggan, Asia's No. 1 Restaurant for 2015. This 2016, she did two back to back Six Hands dinners with Gallery Vask, first with Narisawa's Yoshihiro Narisawa and Central's Virgilio Martirez; and then with Quintonil's Jorge Vallejo and Jungsik's Jungsik Yim.

Philippine Tatler recently named listed her as part of their Generation T, which named "100 of the Philippines’ brightest connectors, creative visionaries, influential innovators and disruptive talents," changing the Philippines.
