= Al Thornton =

American basketball player (born 1983)

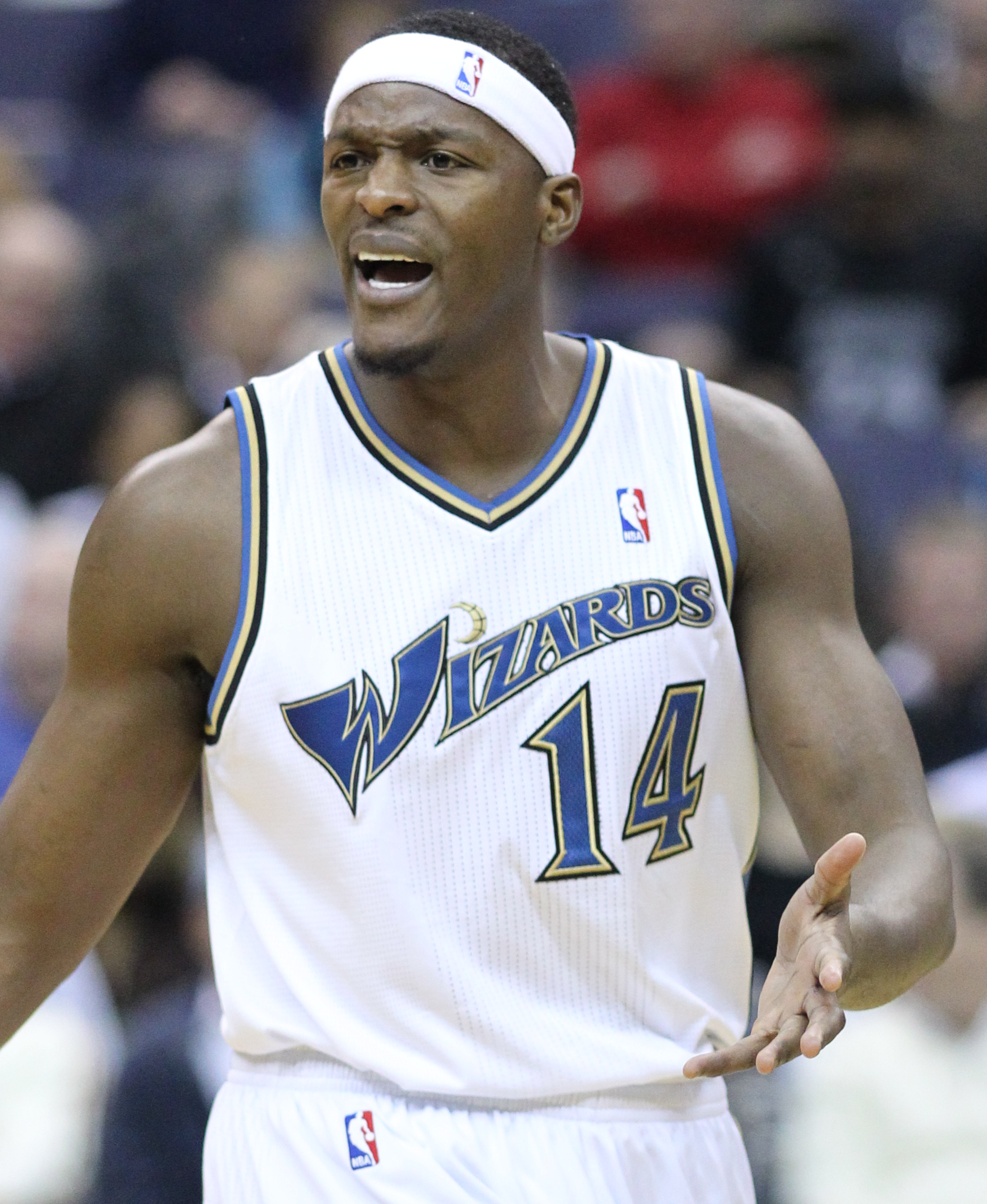
- Thornton with the Washington Wizards in 2011

No. 1 – Peñarol Mar del Plata
- Position: Small forward / power forward
- League: LNB

Personal information
- Born: December 7, 1983 (age 42) Perry, Georgia, U.S.
- Listed height: 6 ft 8 in (2.03 m)
- Listed weight: 235 lb (107 kg)

Career information
- High school: Perry (Perry, Georgia)
- College: Florida State (2003–2007)
- NBA draft: 2007: 1st round, 14th overall pick
- Drafted by: Los Angeles Clippers
- Playing career: 2007–present

Career history
- 2007–2010: Los Angeles Clippers
- 2010–2011: Washington Wizards
- 2011: Golden State Warriors
- 2012: Brujos de Guayama
- 2012: Zhejiang Lions
- 2014: Brujos de Guayama
- 2015–2016: NLEX Road Warriors
- 2017: Gaiteros del Zulia
- 2017: Brujos de Guayama
- 2018: Shimane Susanoo Magic
- 2019–2020: Suwon KT Sonicboom
- 2020–2021: Club Atlético Aguada
- 2021–2022: Peñarol Mar del Plata
- 2022: Trotamundos B.B.C.
- 2022–2023: Peñarol Mar del Plata
- 2023: Club Atlético Olimpia
- 2023–present: Peñarol Mar del Plata

Career highlights
- NBA All-Rookie First Team (2008); BSN All-Star (2012); BSN First Team (2012); BSN Import Player of the Year (2012); 2× BSN scoring champion (2012, 2014); Venezuela LPB Scoring Leader (2017); Third-team All-American – AP (2007); First-team All-ACC (2007); Second-team All-ACC (2006)
- Stats at NBA.com
- Stats at Basketball Reference

Willie Alford Thornton (born December 7, 1983) is an American professional basketball player for Peñarol Mar del Plata of the Liga Nacional de Básquet (LNB). He had formerly played for the Los Angeles Clippers, Washington Wizards and the Golden State Warriors. Collegiately, he played for Florida State University.

== College career ==
Thornton's outstanding four-year career at Florida State University was capped off by a stellar individual senior year that saw him make the AP All-American squad as a third team choice, a unanimous selection as first-team All-ACC, and was runner-up to Boston College's Jared Dudley for the ACC Player of the Year. He led the ACC in scoring and averaged over 7 rebounds per game as well. His season came to a disappointing end as the Seminoles did not qualify for the NCAA tournament for the ninth straight season and were forced to play in the NIT.

== Professional career ==
=== Los Angeles Clippers ===
On June 28, 2007, Thornton was taken 14th overall in the 2007 NBA draft by the Los Angeles Clippers. Thornton also has the same agent as Yao Ming. On July 9, Thornton played his first summer league game for the Clippers, scoring 24 points and registering 8 rebounds, 1 assist, and 2 blocks in a 108–102 loss to the Denver Nuggets.

In just his third preseason game as a rookie, Thornton led the Clippers to a win over the Golden State Warriors with 24 points on 11–15 shooting, including a perfect 2–2 from behind the 3-point arc while also connecting on all 8 of his first attempts from the floor.

With Ruben Patterson in the starting lineup at the start of the season, Thornton would not get the playing time he had received during preseason. Patterson was waived on December 13, 2007, in order to give the rookie more playing time. With a slew of injuries to the Clippers' big men, including Paul Davis with a torn ACL, Tim Thomas with recurring back and ankle injuries, and Elton Brand sidelined with a ruptured achilles tendon, Thornton took advantage of his minutes playing power forward and small forward when teammate Corey Maggette was on the bench.

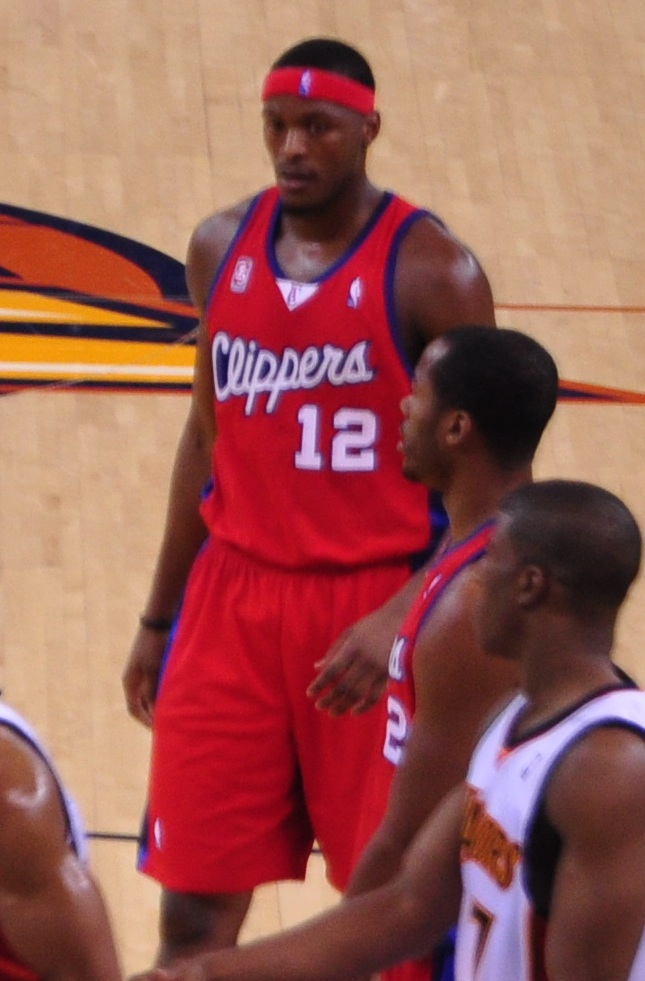
Thornton with the Clippers in March 2009.

On January 30, 2008, Thornton scored a then season-high 33 points against the Atlanta Hawks, including a significant block in the final seconds in a 95–88 Clipper win. Thornton also recorded his first double-double on February 9, in a loss to the Philadelphia 76ers, in which he had 18 points and 10 rebounds.

On March 29, 2008, Thornton equaled a rookie franchise record (and Clippers season-high) 39 points on 13 of 23 field goal shooting, 3 of 6 from behind the arch, and 10 of 12 from the line in a 110–97 win over the Memphis Grizzlies. Thornton scored 20 of his 39 in the fourth quarter to seal the win and snap the Clippers' 10-game losing streak.

On May 13, 2008, Al Thornton was named to the 2008 NBA All-Rookie First Team.

On October 31, 2008, Thornton had a double-double with 30 points and 11 rebounds, a season high.

=== Washington Wizards ===
On February 17, 2010, Thornton was traded from the Los Angeles Clippers to the Washington Wizards as part of a three-team, six-player trade that sent Antawn Jamison from Washington to the Cleveland Cavaliers, Žydrūnas Ilgauskas, a 2010 first-round pick and the rights to Emir Preldžič from Cleveland to Washington, Drew Gooden from Washington to Los Angeles, and Sebastian Telfair from Los Angeles to Cleveland.

=== Golden State Warriors ===
On March 1, 2011, he reached a buyout agreement with the Wizards and was waived. He signed a contract with the Golden State Warriors on March 3, 2011.

On March 14, 2011, Thornton scored 23 points against the Sacramento Kings, his most points as a member of the Warriors.

=== Puerto Rico ===
On February 19, 2012, he signed with the Guayama Wizards of the Puerto Rican basketball league Baloncesto Superior Nacional. There he averaged 18.7 points per game.

=== China ===
On September 29, 2012, Thornton signed with the Zhejiang Lions of the Chinese Basketball Association. Due to injury, he was replaced mid-season by Gary Forbes.

=== Return to Puerto Rico ===
In March 2014, he rejoined the Guayama Wizards of the Baloncesto Superior Nacional.

=== Philippines ===
On January 2, 2015, he signed with the NLEX Road Warriors. He made his debut during the 2015 Commissioner's Cup in a loss to the Rain or Shine Elasto Painters with 28 points and 12 rebounds. In a loss to the Alaska Aces, he led the team with 39 points and 13 rebounds. He was then held to a PBA career-low 11 points on 3-of-14 from the field. He bounced back with 39 points and 15 rebounds as he finally led NLEX to its first win of the conference. From there, NLEX won five straight games to get into the playoffs, including a win over Barangay Ginebra in which he scored 50 points. In the playoffs, they were swept by the Meralco Bolts.

In January 2016, Thornton returned to the Philippines to play again for NLEX for the 2016 Commissioner's Cup. He started NLEX's campaign by scoring 50 points once again in an overtime win over Ginebra. In a triple overtime game against the San Miguel Beermen, he scored 69 points, the highest in his career and most by any PBA player in over two decades, but his team still lost. NLEX did not qualify for the playoffs that conference.

Thornton was tapped to represent the Mighty Sports PH the representative club of the Philippines at the 2016 William Jones Cup. Thornton led the Mighty Sports-Philippines past South Korea on its second day with 24 points in an 86–65 win. Thornton once again led the Mighty Sports by beating India 81–101 with 30 points and on the following day versus Iran 80-73 tallying 24 points and 10 rebounds. Thornton carried the Mighty Sports to a 7–0 win–loss record in the tournament with a double-double 20 points and 15 rebounds by beating Egypt 61-80 and eventually winning the gold medal with an unblemished record of 8–0 by beating Chinese Taipei B 80–104 on the last day of the tournament.

=== Japan ===
On February 28, 2018, Thornton signed with the Shimane Susanoo Magic of the Japanese B.League.

=== The BIG 3 ===
Thornton had initially gone undrafted in the inaugural BIG 3 draft. Al was later acquired by Allen Iverson's 3's Company team. Al provided "3's Company" with scoring off the bench and went on to become the league's first 4th Man.

=== Uruguay ===
On August 7, 2020, Thornton signed with Club Atlético Aguada of the Liga Uruguaya de Basketball.

== NBA career statistics ==
Legend
GP	Games played	GS	Games started	MPG	Minutes per game
FG%	Field goal percentage	3P%	3-point field goal percentage	FT%	Free throw percentage
RPG	Rebounds per game	APG	Assists per game	SPG	Steals per game
BPG	Blocks per game	PPG	Points per game	**Bold**	Career high

=== Regular season ===
Year	Team	GP	GS	MPG	FG%	3P%	FT%	RPG	APG	SPG	BPG	PPG
2007–08	L.A. Clippers	**79**	31	27.3	.429	.331	.743	4.5	1.2	.6	.5	12.7
2008–09	L.A. Clippers	71	**67**	**37.4**	.446	.253	.754	**5.2**	**1.5**	**.8**	**.9**	**16.8**
2009–10	L.A. Clippers	51	30	27.5	.478	**.357**	.741	3.8	1.2	.5	.4	10.7
2009–10	Washington	24	16	28.1	.463	.353	.694	4.3	1.2	.8	.5	10.7
2010–11	Washington	49	23	21.8	.471	.160	.757	3.2	1.0	.6	.2	8.0
2010–11	Golden State	22	0	14.3	**.490**	.000	**.829**	2.6	.5	.3	.1	6.0
Career		296	167	28.0	.452	.293	.747	4.2	1.2	.6	.5	11.9

== Personal ==
Thornton is a cousin of fellow NBA player Marcus Thornton. He is the son of Alford and Philomenia Thornton.
