= Charles Tiu =

Filipino basketball coach and TV presenter

Phoenix Super LPG Fuel Masters
- Position: Head coach
- League: PBA / NCAA

Personal information
- Born: January 11, 1989 (age 37)
- Coaching career: 2009–present

Career history

Coaching
- 2009–2011: Philippines (assistant)
- 2011–2012: Powerade Tigers (assistant)
- 2011–2013: Barako Bull Energy (assistant)
- 2017–2020: Mighty Sports
- 2019–2021: Nueva Ecija Rice Vanguards
- 2020–2021: Benilde (assistant)
- 2021–2022: Meralco Bolts (assistant)
- 2022–present: Benilde
- 2023–present: Strong Group Athletics
- 2024–2025: Converge FiberXers (assistant)
- 2026–present: Phoenix Super LPG Fuel Masters

Career highlights
- As head coach: Dubai International Basketball Championship (2020); 3× William Jones Cup champion (2019, 2024, 2025); Republica Cup champion (2018); PBA D-League champion (2018 Foundation Cup); As assistant coach: William Jones Cup champion (2016)

Charles Alandy-Dy Tiu (born January 11, 1989) is a TV presenter and basketball coach who currently serves as head coach of the Phoenix Super LPG Fuel Masters of the Philippine Basketball Association (PBA), the Benilde Blazers of NCAA Philippines, and Strong Group Athletics. He is the brother of Chris Tiu.

== Coaching career ==
His basketball career started at 2009 still in college, when Rajko Toroman, the Smart Gilas coach hired him as an assistant. After Smart Gilas, he was hired by Powerade Tigers as an assistant coach to Bo Perasol. In 2013, he reunited with Toroman in Barako Bull Energy, again as his assistant coach.

He reunited with Perasol (appointed as consultant) in Mighty Sports, where he was hired as an assistant coach. He later served as team's head coach. He also worked on coaching jobs such as head coach of Nueva Ecija Rice Vanguards in MPBL, and assistant coach of both Benilde Blazers and Meralco Bolts.

He was hired by the Blazers as their head coach, replacing TY Tang. He led the Blazers to a finals appearance after 20 years. He was also concurrently coach of Strong Group Athletics.

In 2024, Tiu joined the Converge FiberXers coaching staff as an assistant.

On January 20, 2026, Tiu secured his first head coach role in the PBA with the Phoenix Fuel Masters.

== TV career ==
Tiu worked formerly as night telecast host of SportsDesk on CNN Philippines.

== Personal life ==
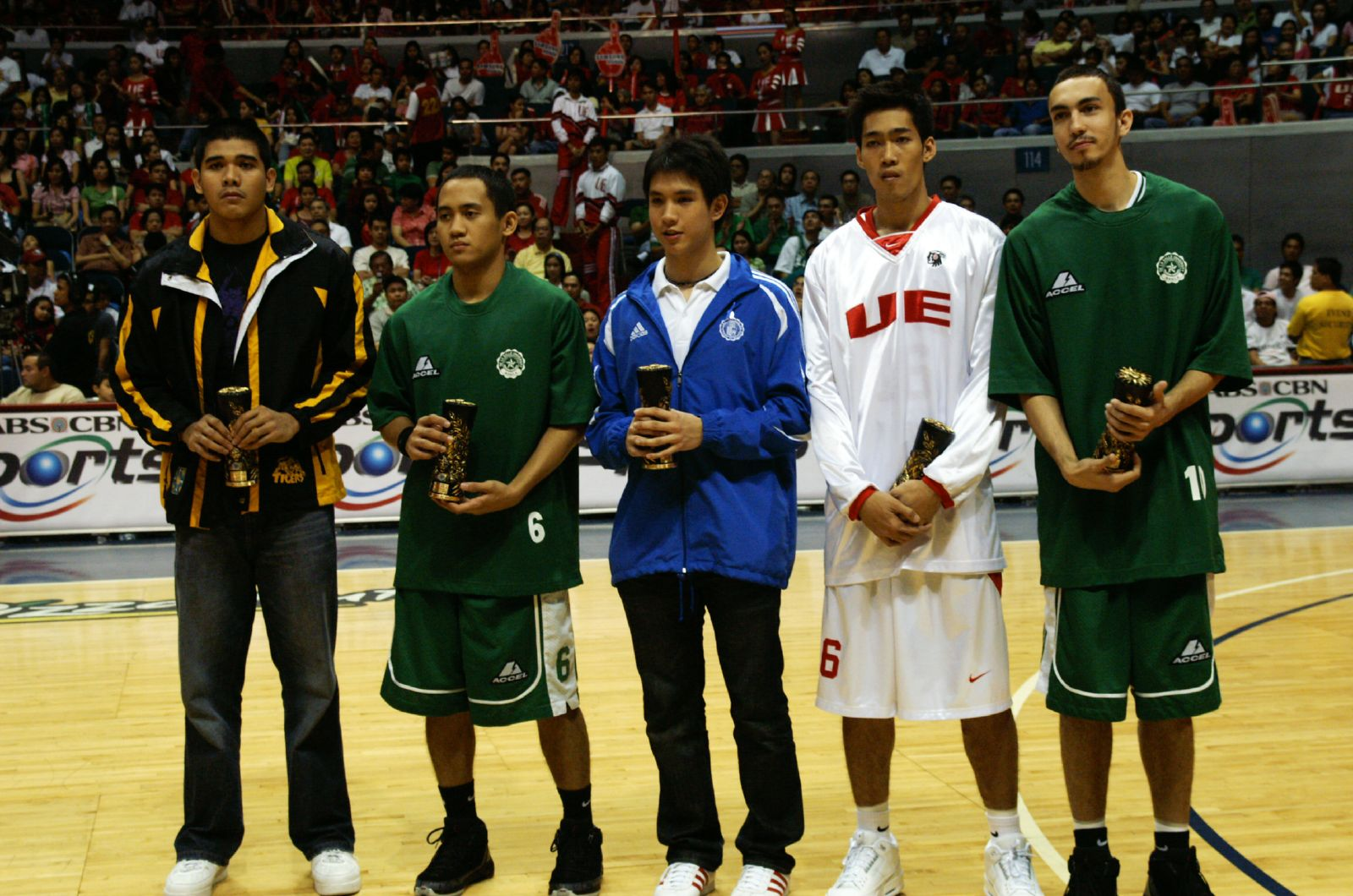
Charles Tiu, center wearing blue, representing his brother Chris in awarding ceremonies of the UAAP Season 70 men's basketball tournament in 2007.

Tiu is one of five children of Jerry and Lianne Tiu. He has two brothers, Christian and Christopher "Chris", and two sisters, Cheryl and Cristine. Tiu married Sari Lazaro in 2020.

Tiu has served as a barangay councilor of Urdaneta, Makati, having been elected in 2018.

On June 5, 2024, Tiu hosted 'The Asia Pacific Tambuli Awards'. In the prestigious event, he introduced his godparent, SM Prime's Hans Sy, who was bestowed the Lifetime Achievement Award.

== Coaching record ==
=== Collegiate ===
Season	Team	GP	W	L	PCT	Finish	PG	PW	PL	PPCT	Results
2021	CSB	9	5	4	.556	4th/10	2	1	1	.500	Lost in the play-in
2022	CSB	18	14	4	.778	1st/10	4	2	2	.500	Lost in the Finals
2023	CSB	18	11	7	.611	4th/10	2	1	1	.500	Won 3rd place playoff
2024	CSB	18	14	4	.778	2nd/10	3	1	2	.333	Lost in the Finals
2025	CSB	13	9	4	.692	2nd/5	6	2	4	.333	Lost 3rd place playoff
Totals		63	44	19	.698		11	5	6	.454	0 championship
