= Chris Tiu =

Filipino basketball player (born 1985)

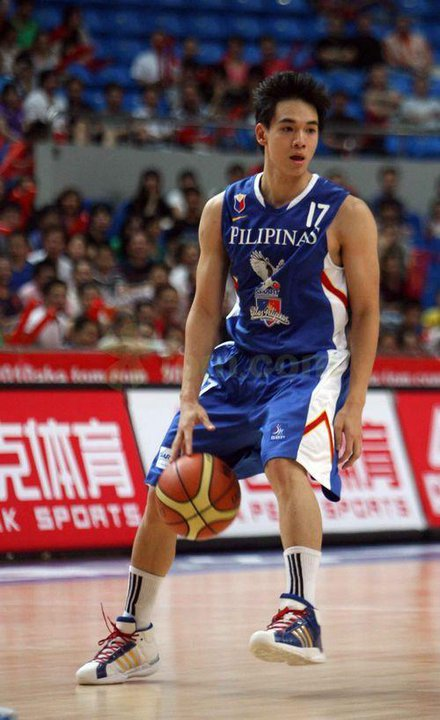
- Tiu with the Philippine national team in 2012

Personal information
- Born: July 15, 1985 (age 41) San Juan, Philippines
- Listed height: 5 ft 11 in (1.80 m)
- Listed weight: 170 lb (77 kg)

Career information
- High school: Xavier School (San Juan)
- College: Ateneo (2003–2004, 2006–2008)
- PBA draft: 2012: 1st round, 7th overall pick
- Drafted by: Rain or Shine Elasto Painters
- Playing career: 2012–2018
- Position: Point guard

Career history
- 2012–2018: Rain or Shine Elasto Painters

Career highlights
- PBA champion (2016 Commissioner's); PBA All-Rookie Team (2013); PBA All-Star Three-point champion (2013); UAAP Seniors champion (2008); 2× UAAP Mythical Five (2007, 2008); PCCL champion (2007); Nike Summer League champion (2008)

Christopher John Alandy-Dy Tiu (born July 15, 1985) is a Filipino former professional basketball player. He played college basketball for the Ateneo Blue Eagles with whom he won the UAAP title in 2008. He went on to play his entire professional career for the Rain or Shine Elasto Painters of the Philippine Basketball Association (PBA), winning the Commissioner's Cup in 2016. He also played for the Philippine national basketball team and was captain of the roster that competed in the 2011 FIBA Asia Championship. Outside basketball, he is a TV host, model, politician, and businessman. He now hosts the television show iBilib on GMA.

== Early life ==
Tiu is the second eldest of five children of Jerry and Lianne Tiu. He has two brothers, Christian and Charles, and two sisters, Cheryl and Cristine. His father is president of Tagaytay Highlands Clubs, a leisure resort and owns several other corporations. Cheryl is a lifestyle journalist for The Philippine Star, while Charles is the basketball coach for the Benilde Blazers and Phoenix Super LPG Fuel Masters. He has Chinese blood that goes back to his great-grandparents.

Tiu took his elementary and high school education at Xavier School in San Juan City, Philippines, and his collegiate education at Ateneo de Manila University in Quezon City, Philippines, where he earned a Bachelor of Science degree in management engineering and a minor in Chinese studies.

== Amateur career ==
He played juniors basketball for the Xavier School Golden Stallions, where he was part of the "three-peat" Metro Manila Tiong Lian Basketball Association Champion team from 2001 to 2003. His teammates in Xavier included Joseph Yeo and TY Tang. In 2019, he was honored by the school during its alumni awards.

== College career ==
Tiu played for the Ateneo Blue Eagles for his collegiate basketball career. He almost played for DLSU as his Xavier teammates Yeo and Tang had committed to that university. He and his teammates managed to enter the UAAP Finals in 2003 where they failed to defend their title against the FEU Tamaraws. He skipped Season 68 as he was taking his junior term abroad at Lille Catholic University, but returned to Ateneo the following season. They returned to the Finals in 2006, but they lost to the UST Growling Tigers in three games. In 2008, they managed to break their six-year championship drought against their archrival the DLSU Green Archers which was led by JVee Casio and Rico Maierhofer at that time in two games. He was also a 2x UAAP Mythical Team Member. His coach in college was Norman Black.

In 2008, Tiu was named Favorite Athlete in the first Nickelodeon Philippines Kids' Choice Awards held at Aliw Theater, Pasay.

== Professional career ==
=== Rain or Shine Elasto Painters (2012–2018) ===
On August 3, 2012, he declared for the 2012 PBA Rookie Draft after years of focusing on the Smart Gilas national team. On August 19, he was selected 7th overall by the Rain or Shine Elasto Painters during the 1st round. In 2013, he won that year's three-point shootout during the 2013 All-Star Weekend. He won one title with the Elasto Painters in 2016 (Commissioner's Cup) before announcing his retirement in January 2019. He also scored a career-high 30 points in his final game.

== National team career ==
After his UAAP career, Tiu went to play for the national team as the team captain of the newly formed Smart Gilas Pilipinas national team from 2008 to 2012. His teammates at that time were JVee Casio, Marcus Douthit, Japeth Aguilar, Chris Lutz, Marcio Lassiter and Mark Barroca. They were under Coach Rajko Toroman at that time. He played in three FIBA Asia Champions Cup tournaments, and was also on the 2011 FIBA Asia Championship squad. He also got to play in the 2009–10 PBA Philippine Cup and the 2011 Commissioner's Cup as Gilas was a guest team in those conferences. In 2011, Gilas got bronze in that year's Jones Cup.

=== 2010 Asian Games ===
In 2010, Tiu also got to play in that year's Asian Games. He had 14 points with four triples in a loss to Iran. He then had 15 in a bounce back win over Chinese Taipei. They went on to finish sixth in that tournament.

=== 2011 SEABA Championship ===
In order to qualify for the 2011 FIBA Asia Championship, Tiu and the Gilas team first had to finish in the top three of the 2011 SEABA Championship. Gilas went on to sweep the tournament, and get the gold medal.

=== 2011 SEA Games ===
Tiu was the team captain of the Sinag Pilipinas team that was sent to the 2011 Southeast Asian Games, where they captured the gold medal against Thailand. His teammates included Ateneo Blue Eagles Kiefer Ravena, Nico Salva, Emman Monfort, Greg Slaughter and Justin Chua together with Jeric Fortuna and Jeric Teng of the UST Growling Tigers, Bobby Ray Parks Jr. of the NU Bulldogs, RR Garcia of the FEU Tamaraws, Garvo Lanete, Dave Marcelo and Jake Pascual of the San Beda Red Lions. They were also joined by two Filipino-Americans Cliff Hodge and Chris Ellis. They were under the mentorship of Coach Norman Black and Coach Glenn Capacio.

=== 2012 SEABA Cup ===
Now coached by Chot Reyes, Tiu was in the lineup for the 2012 SEABA Cup. They swept the tournament, making Gilas the best team in Southeast Asia.

=== 2018 Asian Games ===
In 2018, Coach Yeng Guiao and core players of Rain or Shine, including Tiu, represented the Philippines in the 2018 Asian Games. This was his last international tournament. He got to play with Fil-Am NBA player Jordan Clarkson. They finished fifth, the highest a Philippine team has gotten since 2002.

== PBA career statistics ==
Legend
GP	Games played	MPG	Minutes per game
FG%	Field-goal percentage	3P%	3-point field-goal percentage	FT%	Free-throw percentage
RPG	Rebounds per game	APG	Assists per game	SPG	Steals per game
BPG	Blocks per game	PPG	Points per game	**Bold**	Career high

=== Season-by-season averages ===
Year	Team	GP	MPG	FG%	3P%	FT%	RPG	APG	SPG	BPG	PPG
2012–13	Rain or Shine	44	17.4	.382	.268	.821	2.4	2.0	.5	.0	6.0
2013–14	Rain or Shine	**55**	14.2	.341	.263	.761	2.1	1.6	.3	.1	3.9
2014–15	Rain or Shine	38	15.4	.383	.330	.825	1.8	2.1	.2	.0	5.6
2015–16	Rain or Shine	50	15.0	**.417**	.371	**.853**	2.2	2.2	.2	.1	5.5
2016–17	Rain or Shine	35	15.0	.375	.377	.852	2.6	2.1	.5	.0	5.9
2017–18	Rain or Shine	35	**24.2**	.399	**.383**	.768	**2.8**	**4.0**	**.8**	**.3**	**10.7**
Career		257	16.8	.384	.337	.812	2.3	2.3	.4	.1	6.0

== Player profile ==
Tiu is known for his shooting, his basketball smarts and leadership, and his physicality. Throughout his basketball career, he has made multiple clutch shots and clutch free throws. Coach Toroman, who made him team captain when he was with Smart Gilas, called him the "best captain of the team" he ever had, with his commitment and basketball IQ. His leadership was also seen in his PBA career as he became one of the veterans for Rain or Shine, soothing tensions within the team and mentoring younger players. Despite his small stature and heartthrob looks, he could be tough on the court when needed, taking charges and challenging shots. He is unathletic, so he relied on his effort to hustle on defense.

== Personal life ==
Tiu married investment banker Clarisse Ong on September 7, 2013, at a ceremony in Vancouver, Canada after twelve years of dating. In May 2016, after winning the 2016 PBA Commissioner's Cup, Tiu announced through an Instagram post that he and Ong were expecting their first child. Their daughter, Amanda Claire, was born on June 5, 2016. The couple's second daughter, Mari Diana, was born on February 25, 2018. The Tiu family are Catholics.

In July 2019, Tiu was appointed as an ambassador of the Department of Science and Technology. Later that same year, he was the Volunteers Program Deputy Director for the 2019 SEA Games.

=== Politics ===
Tiu served as a barangay official of Urdaneta, Makati from 2002 to 2018: first as the Sangguniang Kabataan Chairman, and later as a Barangay Kagawad.

=== Business ===
While in college, he set up a food stall on the Ateneo de Manila campus called Chinky Chickens. He was able to expand the business to another branch in Miriam College. Tiu's business ventures with fellow partners include:

- Happy Lemon, a chain of tea shops.
- Eric Kayser, a French bakery and pastry shop.
- VLink Interactive, a marketing communications firm where he is the chief marketing officer.

Tiu was also an endorser of multiple brands such as Adidas, underwear brand Hanford, Dockers, Levi's, Nestlé, and many more. He is the brand ambassador of IT solutions provider DFNN.

== Filmography ==
=== Television ===
Year	Title	Role	TV Station
2007–2010	Pinoy Records	Host	GMA Network
2008–2011	Ripley's Believe It or Not	Host	GMA Network/QTV
2009	Clear Men Future League	Host	SOLARtv
2010–2011	Ako Mismo	Host	TV5
2010–2011	Hanep Buhay	Host	GMA Network
2011	Man Vs. Beast	Host	GMA Network
2012–present	iBilib	Host	GMA Network
2012	Toink!: Sino Ang Tama?	Host	TV5
2012	1-on-1 Tiu-torials	Host	AKTV
2012–2013	WattaJob	Host	GMA Network
2013	Mutya ng Pilipinas 2013	Host	GMA Network

== Awards and nominations ==
Year	Award	Category	Result
**2008**	Nickelodeon Philippines Kids' Choice Awards	Favorite Athlete	Won
**2008**	Loyola Schools Awards for Leadership and Service	Ateneo Sportsman of the Year	Won
**2010**	Lingkod TV Awards	Favorite Youth Personality	Won
**2013**	USTv Students' Choice Awards	Sports Personality	Won

2013 PBA All Rookie Team (won)

2013 ASEAN Youth Day Award (won)

2013 The Outstanding Young Men (TOYM) Award (won)

2015 MITv Gawad Kamalayan "Natatanging Informative Program Host" (won)

2015 USTv Students' Choice Awards - Sports Personality (won)
