= 2019 William Jones Cup =

Annual basketball tournament

Tournament information
- Dates: M: 12–21 July 2019; W: 24–28 July 2019
- Host: Taiwan
- Venue: 3
- Teams: M: 9 W: 6
- Website: jonescup.meetagile.com

Final positions
- Champions: M: (Philippines) Mighty Sports (2nd title, 6th title for country); W: (Japan) Mitsubishi Electric Koalas
- 1st runners-up: M: South Korea; W: New Zealand
- 2nd runners-up: M: Japan; W: Republic of China White

The 2019 William Jones Cup is the 41st staging of William Jones Cup, an international basketball tournament held in Changhua, and New Taipei City, Taiwan. The men's tournament was held from 12 to 21 July 2019 while the women's tournament will be contested from 24 to 28 July 2019.

== Men's tournament ==
=== Participating teams ===
- (Canada) UBC Thunderbirds
- Indonesia
- Iran U23
- Jordan
- Japan
- South Korea
- (Philippines) Mighty Sports
- Republic of China Blue
- Republic of China White

=== Team standings ===
Team	Pld	W	L	PF	PA	PD	Pts	Tie
(Philippines) Mighty Sports	8	8	0	759	585	+174	16	
South Korea	8	7	1	671	571	+100	15	
Japan	8	6	2	606	565	+41	14	
Republic of China Blue	8	5	3	676	635	+41	13	
Iran U23	8	4	4	615	604	+11	12	
Jordan	8	2	6	599	605	−6	10	1–0
Republic of China White	8	2	6	593	631	−38	10	0–1
Indonesia	8	1	7	499	734	−235	9	1–0
(Canada) UBC Thunderbirds	8	1	7	641	729	−88	9	0–1

=== Games ===
==== Day 1 ====
12 July
13:00

Report

Republic of China White	92–84 (OT)	(Canada) UBC Thunderbirds
Scoring by quarter: 21–27, 21–16, 15–16, 22–19, Overtime: 14–6

Changhua Stadium, Changhua

14 July
15:00

Report

Mighty Sports (Philippines)	98–72	Iran U23
Scoring by quarter: 21–12, 25–21, 32–18, 20–21

Changhua Stadium, Changhua

12 July
17:00

Report

South Korea	69–64	Jordan
Scoring by quarter: 20–17, 13–17, 22–24, 14–6

Changhua Stadium, Changhua

12 July
19:30

Report

Republic of China Blue	75–77	Japan
Scoring by quarter: 16–19, 14–24, 26–16, 19–18

Changhua Stadium, Changhua

==== Day 2 ====
13 July
13:00

Report

Jordan	74–90	(Philippines) Mighty Sports
Scoring by quarter: 16–21, 13–23, 15–24, 30–22

Changhua Stadium, Changhua

13 July
15:00

Report

Indonesia	80–70	(Canada) UBC Thunderbirds
Scoring by quarter: 10–12, 19–21, 23–25, 28–12

Changhua Stadium, Changhua

13 July
17:00

Report

Republic of China White	60–66	South Korea
Scoring by quarter: 13–21, 12–11, 19–21, 16–13

Changhua Stadium, Changhua

13 July
19:00

Report

Iran U23	88–91 (OT)	Republic of China Blue
Scoring by quarter: 15–28, 21–20, 22–12, 20–18, Overtime: 10–13

Changhua Stadium, Changhua

==== Day 3 ====
14 July
13:00

Report

Indonesia	51–79	Jordan
Scoring by quarter: 21–12, 10–18, 14–23, 6–26

Changhua Stadium, Changhua

14 July
15:00

Report

Mighty Sports (Philippines)	94–59	Japan
Scoring by quarter: 22–17, 16–9, 31–23, 25–10

Changhua Stadium, Changhua

14 July
17:00

Report

Iran U23	79–83	South Korea
Scoring by quarter: 17–17, 11–28, 29–25, 21–13

Changhua Stadium, Changhua

14 July
19:00

Report

UBC Thunderbirds (Canada)	99–102 (OT)	Republic of China Blue
Scoring by quarter: 25–25, 19–14, 23–23, 21–26, Overtime: 11–14

Changhua Stadium, Changhua

==== Day 4 ====
15 July
13:00

Report

South Korea	117–55	Indonesia
Scoring by quarter: 30–15, 27–19, 36–5, 24–16

Changhua Stadium, Changhua

15 July
15:00

Report

Mighty Sports (Philippines)	116–87	(Canada) UBC Thunderbirds
Scoring by quarter: 26–27, 39–9, 33–22, 18–29

Changhua Stadium, Changhua

15 July
17:00

Report

Japan	72–63	Jordan
Scoring by quarter: 19–15, 16–23, 17–18, 20–7

Changhua Stadium, Changhua

15 July
19:00

Report

Republic of China Blue	87–77	Republic of China White
Scoring by quarter: 17–25, 29–17, 31–15, 10–20

Changhua Stadium, Changhua

==== Day 5 ====
16 July
13:00

Report

UBC Thunderbirds (Canada)	61–72	Iran
Scoring by quarter: 9–20, 29–19, 13–17, 10–16

Changhua Stadium, Changhua

16 July
15:00

Report

Japan	88–61	Indonesia
Scoring by quarter: 14–19, 25–17, 24–12, 25–13

Changhua Stadium, Changhua

16 July
17:00

Report

South Korea	82–89	(Philippines) Mighty Sports
Scoring by quarter: 21–23, 17–28, 28–9, 16–29

Changhua Stadium, Changhua

16 July
19:00

Report

Jordan	93–69	Republic of China White
Scoring by quarter: 18–18, 22–14, 24–19, 29–18

Changhua Stadium, Changhua

==== Day 6 ====
18 July
13:00

Report

Jordan	77–82	Iran U23
Scoring by quarter: 13–17, 24–21, 20–21, 20–23

Xinzhuang Gymnasium, New Taipei City

18 July
15:00

Report

UBC Thunderbirds (Canada)	79–101	South Korea
Scoring by quarter: 19–24, 23–25, 15–26, 22–26

Xinzhuang Gymnasium, New Taipei City

18 July
17:00

Report

Japan	68–60	Republic of China White
Scoring by quarter: 17–15, 16–19, 13–13, 22–13

Xinzhuang Gymnasium, New Taipei City

18 July
19:00

Report

Indonesia	57–94	Republic of China Blue
Scoring by quarter: 14–26, 11–29, 15–27, 17–12

Xinzhuang Gymnasium, New Taipei City

==== Day 7 ====
19 July
13:00

Rep7ort

Republic of China White	67–76	Iran U23
Scoring by quarter: 15–26, 17–19, 16–18, 19–13

Xinzhuang Gymnasium, New Taipei City

19 July
15:00

Report

Indonesia	66–94	(Philippines) Mighty Sports
Scoring by quarter: 13–27, 17–18, 13–26, 23–23

Xinzhuang Gymnasium, New Taipei City

19 July
17:00

Report

Japan	81–83	South Korea
Scoring by quarter: 19–16, 12–27, 24–23, 26–17

Xinzhuang Gymnasium, New Taipei City

19 July
19:00

Report

Republic of China Blue	89–70	Jordan
Scoring by quarter: 20–16, 26–18, 21–16, 22–20

Xinzhuang Gymnasium, New Taipei City

==== Day 8 ====
20 July
13:00

Report

Republic of China White	97–76	Indonesia
Scoring by quarter: 18–21, 17–25, 34–15, 28–15

Xinzhuang Gymnasium, New Taipei City

20 July
15:00

Report

Jordan	79–83	(Canada) UBC Thunderbirds
Scoring by quarter: 22–11, 18–33, 19–13, 20–26

Xinzhuang Gymnasium, New Taipei City

20 July
17:00

Report

Iran U23	51–74	Japan
Scoring by quarter: 4–9, 15–18, 15–21, 17–26

Xinzhuang Gymnasium, New Taipei City

20 July
19:00

Report

Mighty Sports (Philippines)	97–74	Republic of China Blue
Scoring by quarter: 24–14, 26–18, 22–17, 25–25

Xinzhuang Gymnasium, New Taipei City

==== Day 9 ====
21 July
13:00

Report

Indonesia	53–95	Iran U23
Scoring by quarter: 11–26, 8–22, 18–25, 16–22

Xinzhuang Gymnasium, New Taipei City

21 July
15:00

Report

Japan	87–78	(Canada) UBC Thunderbirds
Scoring by quarter: 14–25, 22–14, 26–19, 25–20

Xinzhuang Gymnasium, New Taipei City

21 July
17:00

Report

Mighty Sports (Philippines)	81–71	Republic of China White
Scoring by quarter: 15–16, 25–16, 19–23, 22–16

Xinzhuang Gymnasium, New Taipei City

21 July
19:00

Report

Republic of China Blue	64–70	South Korea
Scoring by quarter: 21–20, 8–18, 21–19, 14–13

Xinzhuang Gymnasium, New Taipei City

== Women's tournament ==
=== Participating teams ===
- (Japan) Mitsubishi Electric Koalas
- (South Korea) Korea National Bank KB Stars
- New Zealand
- Philippines
- Republic of China Blue
- Republic of China White

Team	Pld	W	L	PF	PA	PD	Pts	
(Japan) Mitsubishi Electric Koalas	5	5	0	436	346	+90	10	
New Zealand	5	4	1	425	374	+51	9	
Republic of China White	5	2	3	371	378	−7	7	1–1, +22
(South Korea) Korea National Bank KB Stars	5	2	3	363	375	−12	7	1–1, -4
Republic of China Blue	5	2	3	381	417	−36	7	1–1, -18
Philippines	5	0	5	408	474	−66	5	

=== Games ===
==== Day 1 ====
24 July
14:00

Report

Philippines	72–106	New Zealand
Scoring by quarter: 14–25, 25–34, 17–22, 16–25

Xinzhuang Gymnasium, New Taipei City

24 July
16:00

Report

South Korea	58–54	Republic of China White
Scoring by quarter: 11–11, 16–16, 17–15, 14–12

Xinzhuang Gymnasium, New Taipei City

24 July
18:00

Report

Republic of China Blue	67–75	Mitsubishi Electric Koalas
Scoring by quarter: 12–15, 13–24, 21–16, 21–20

Xinzhuang Gymnasium, New Taipei City

==== Day 2 ====
25 July
14:00

Report

New Zealand	73–61	South Korea
Scoring by quarter: 23–15, 22–16, 19–15, 9–15

Xinzhuang Gymnasium, New Taipei City

25 July
16:00

Report

Mitsubishi Electric Koalas	85–82	Philippines
Scoring by quarter: 25–13, 21–20, 23–26, 16–23

Xinzhuang Gymnasium, New Taipei City

25 July
18:00

Report

Republic of China White	85–59	Republic of China Blue
Scoring by quarter: 28–15, 19–6, 18–17, 20–21

Xinzhuang Gymnasium, New Taipei City

==== Day 3 ====
26 July
14:00

Report

Mitsubishi Electric Koalas	80–72	South Korea
Scoring by quarter: 19–25, 15–17, 15–13, 31–17

Xinzhuang Gymnasium, New Taipei City

26 July
16:00

Report

New Zealand	97–78	Republic of China White
Scoring by quarter: 26–23, 14–16, 33–20, 24–19

Xinzhuang Gymnasium, New Taipei City

26 July
18:00

Report

Republic of China Blue	99–91 (OT)	Philippines
Scoring by quarter: 25–27, 18–14, 20–26, 19–15, Overtime: 17–9

Xinzhuang Gymnasium, New Taipei City

==== Day 4 ====
27 July
14:00

Report

Republic of China White	62–81	Mitsubishi Electric Koalas
Scoring by quarter: 18–22, 11–18, 18–20, 15–21

Xinzhuang Gymnasium, New Taipei City

27 July
16:00

Report

South Korea	92–80	Philippines
Scoring by quarter: 28–20, 23–15, 15–24, 26–21

Xinzhuang Gymnasium, New Taipei City

27 July
18:00

Report

New Zealand	86–68	Republic of China Blue
Scoring by quarter: 31–19, 18–13, 16–15, 21–21

Xinzhuang Gymnasium, New Taipei City

==== Day 5 ====
28 July
14:00

Report

Philippines	83–92	Republic of China White
Scoring by quarter: 17–30, 29–23, 12–15, 25–24

Xinzhuang Gymnasium, New Taipei City

28 July
16:00

Report

Mitsubishi Electric Koalas	95–63	New Zealand
Scoring by quarter: 30–14, 21–11, 28–17, 16–21

Xinzhuang Gymnasium, New Taipei City

28 July
18:00

Report

Republic of China Blue	88–80 (OT2)	South Korea
Scoring by quarter: 14–16, 19–12, 19–18, 15–21, Overtime: 7–7, 14–6

Xinzhuang Gymnasium, New Taipei City
