= 2024–25 PBA Commissioner's Cup finals =

Philippine Basketball Association tournament

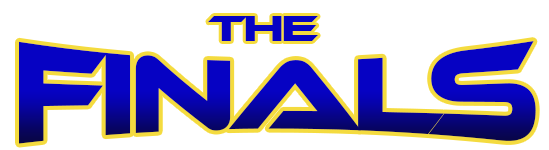
Team	Coach	Wins
(2) TNT Tropang Giga	Chot Reyes	4
(4) Barangay Ginebra San Miguel	Tim Cone	3
- Dates: March 14–28, 2025
- MVP: Rey Nambatac (TNT Tropang Giga)
- Television: Local: RPTV; PBA Rush (HD); International: Pilipinas Live; Online: Pilipinas Live
- Announcers: see Broadcast notes

Referees
- Game 1: Nol Quilinguen, Mike Flordeliza, Jeffrey Tantay, James Paez
- Game 2: Peter Balao, Bing Oliva, Mardy Montoya, Karlo Vergara
- Game 3: Nol Quilinguen, Rommel Gruta, Mike Flordeliza, Jeffrey Tantay
- Game 4: Peter Balao, Bing Oliva, Mike Flordeliza, Karlo Vergara
- Game 5: Nol Quilinguen, Rommel Gruta, Mardy Montoya, Janine Nicandro
- Game 6: Nol Quilinguen, Bing Oliva, Mike Flordeliza, Bryan Peclaro
- Game 7: Nol Quilinguen, Rommel Gruta, Jeffrey Tantay, Karlo Vergara

PBA Commissioner's Cup finals chronology
- < 2023–24 2026 >

PBA finals chronology
- < 2024 Governors' 2025 Philippine >

The 2024–25 Philippine Basketball Association (PBA) Commissioner's Cup finals was the best-of-7 championship series for the 2024–25 PBA Commissioner's Cup and the conclusion of the conference's playoffs.

The TNT Tropang Giga and the Barangay Ginebra San Miguel competed for the 22nd Commissioner's Cup championship and the 137th overall championship contested by the league. This was the second straight finals matchup between TNT and Barangay Ginebra where the Tropang Giga won the 2024 PBA Governors' Cup championship in 6 games, 4–2. It was also their first Commissioner's Cup finals matchup since the 2011 PBA Commissioner's Cup where TNT, then known as the Talk 'N Text Tropang Texters, defeated Barangay Ginebra in 6 games, 4–2.

TNT defeated Barangay Ginebra in seven games to win their second straight championship. Rey Nambatac was named the finals' MVP.

== Background ==
=== Road to the finals ===
TNT Tropang Giga		Barangay Ginebra San Miguel
Finished 8–4 (.667) in 2nd place with Converge and Barangay Ginebra	Elimination round	Finished 8–4 (.667) in 2nd place with TNT and Converge
Head-to-head quotient: TNT 1.04, Converge 1.03, Barangay Ginebra 0.94 (2nd place)	Tiebreaker	Head-to-head quotient: TNT 1.04, Converge 1.03, Barangay Ginebra 0.94 (4th place)
Def. Eastern in one game (twice-to-beat advantage)	Quarterfinals	Def. Meralco, 2–1
Def. Rain or Shine, 4–1	Semifinals	Def. NorthPort, 4–1

=== Head-to-head matchup ===
RPTV

January 17
7:30 pm

Box score

TNT Tropang Giga 91, Barangay Ginebra San Miguel 86
Scoring by quarter: 22–25, 23–21, 23–18, 23–22
Pts: Oftana 32; Rebs: Hollis-Jefferson 13; Asts: Castro, Hollis-Jefferson 6	Pts: Brownlee 20; Rebs: Brownlee 16; Asts: Thompson 7

PhilSports Arena, Pasig

== Series summary ==
Game	Date	Venue	Winner	Result
Game 1	March 14	SM Mall of Asia Arena	TNT	95–89
Game 2	March 16	SM Mall of Asia Arena	Barangay Ginebra	71–70
Game 3	March 19	PhilSports Arena	TNT	87–85
Game 4	March 21	Ynares Center	Barangay Ginebra	95–78
Game 5	March 23	Araneta Coliseum	Barangay Ginebra	73–66
Game 6	March 26	Araneta Coliseum	TNT	87–83
Game 7	March 28	Araneta Coliseum	TNT	87–83 (OT)

== Game summaries ==
=== Game 1 ===
RPTV

March 14
7:30 pm

Box score

TNT Tropang Giga 95, Barangay Ginebra San Miguel 89
Scoring by quarter: 29–18, 26–21, 25–27, 15–23
Pts: Hollis-Jefferson 34; Rebs: Hollis-Jefferson 13; Asts: Hollis-Jefferson 8	Pts: Brownlee 28; Rebs: Brownlee 15; Asts: Thompson 7
TNT leads series, 1–0

SM Mall of Asia Arena, Pasay
Attendance: 11,802
Referees: Nol Quilinguen, Mike Flordeliza, Jeffrey Tantay, James Paez

=== Game 2 ===
RPTV

March 16
7:30 pm

Box score

TNT Tropang Giga 70, Barangay Ginebra San Miguel 71
Scoring by quarter: 15–21, 4–11, 26–22, 25–17
Pts: Hollis-Jefferson 25; Rebs: Hollis-Jefferson 15; Asts: Nambatac 5	Pts: Brownlee 35; Rebs: Thompson 12; Asts: Thompson 7
Series tied, 1–1

SM Mall of Asia Arena, Pasay
Attendance: 12,925
Referees: Peter Balao, Bing Oliva, Mardy Montoya, Karlo Vergara

=== Game 3 ===
RPTV

March 19
7:30 pm

Box score

TNT Tropang Giga 87, Barangay Ginebra San Miguel 85
Scoring by quarter: 17–17, 25–31, 30–18, 15–19
Pts: Nambatac 24; Rebs: Hollis-Jefferson 11; Asts: Hollis-Jefferson 8	Pts: Brownlee 19; Rebs: Thompson 8 Asts: Brownlee 6
TNT leads series, 2–1

PhilSports Arena, Pasig
Referees: Nol Quilinguen, Rommel Gruta, Mike Flordeliza, Jeffrey Tantay

=== Game 4 ===
RPTV

March 21
7:35 pm

Box score

TNT Tropang Giga 78, Barangay Ginebra San Miguel 95
Scoring by quarter: 21–31, 28–22, 17–19, 12–23
Pts: Oftana 17; Rebs: Hollis-Jefferson 12; Asts: Hollis-Jefferson 5	Pts: Malonzo 24; Rebs: Brownlee 12; Asts: Brownlee 5
Series tied, 2–2

Ynares Center, Antipolo, Rizal
Referees: Peter Balao, Bing Oliva, Mike Flordeliza, Karlo Vergara

Prior to the game, NorthPort Batang Pier's Arvin Tolentino was awarded his first Best Player of the Conference award, while TNT's Rondae Hollis-Jefferson was awarded his third Best Import of the Conference award.

=== Game 5 ===
RPTV

March 23
7:30 pm

Box score

TNT Tropang Giga 66, Barangay Ginebra San Miguel 73
Scoring by quarter: 24–17, 21–18, 11–22, 10–16
Pts: Hollis-Jefferson, Nambatac 19; Rebs: Hollis-Jefferson 12; Asts: Oftana 8	Pts: Brownlee 18; Rebs: Brownlee 14; Asts: Brownlee, Thompson 5
Barangay Ginebra leads series, 3–2

Araneta Coliseum, Quezon City
Attendance: 12,447
Referees: Nol Quilinguen, Rommel Gruta, Mardy Montoya, Janine Nicandro

=== Game 6 ===
RPTV

March 26
7:30 pm

Box score

TNT Tropang Giga 87, Barangay Ginebra San Miguel 83
Scoring by quarter: 22–22, 16–20, 25–20, 24–21
Pts: Hollis-Jefferson 29; Rebs: Hollis-Jefferson 13; Asts: Hollis-Jefferson 6	Pts: Brownlee 22; Rebs: Brownlee, Malonzo 7 Asts: Malonzo 5
Series tied, 3–3

Araneta Coliseum, Quezon City
Attendance: 17,654
Referees: Nol Quilinguen, Bing Oliva, Mike Flordeliza, Bryan Peclaro

=== Game 7 ===
RPTV

March 28
7:30 pm

Box score

TNT Tropang Giga 87, Barangay Ginebra San Miguel 83 (OT)
Scoring by quarter: 22–16, 18–19, 20–27, 19–17, Overtime: 8–4
Pts: Hollis-Jefferson 25; Rebs: Hollis-Jefferson 12; Asts: Nambatac 4	Pts: Brownlee 28; Rebs: J. Aguilar 11; Asts: Thompson 8
TNT wins series, 4–3

Araneta Coliseum, Quezon City
Attendance: 21,274
Referees: Nol Quilinguen, Rommel Gruta, Jeffrey Tantay, Karlo Vergara

== Rosters ==
TNT Tropang Giga roster
Players
Coaches

Pos.	#	POB	Name	Height	Weight	DOB (YYYY–MM–DD)	From
F/C	0	(Philippines)	Barkley Eboña	6 ft 6 in (1.98 m)	194 lb (88 kg)	1996–11–29	Far Eastern
G	6	(Philippines)	Rey Nambatac	5 ft 11 in (1.80 m)		1994–01–27	Letran
C	7	(Philippines)	Poy Erram	6 ft 8 in (2.03 m)	227 lb (103 kg)	1989–07–07	Ateneo
F	8	(Philippines)	Calvin Oftana	6 ft 5 in (1.96 m)	196 lb (89 kg)	1996–01–03	San Beda
F	9	(United States)	Paul Varilla	6 ft 3 in (1.91 m)		1993–08–10	UE
G	10	(Philippines)	Ryan Reyes (IN)	6 ft 2 in (1.88 m)	190 lb (86 kg)	1983–08–10	Cal State Fullerton
F	12	(Philippines)	Glenn Khobuntin	6 ft 4 in (1.93 m)	195 lb (88 kg)	1991–09–07	National-U
G	13	(Philippines)	Brian Heruela	5 ft 10 in (1.78 m)	195 lb (88 kg)	1989–04–13	Cebu
G/F	16	(Philippines)	Roger Pogoy (C)	6 ft 2 in (1.88 m)	180 lb (82 kg)	1992–06–16	Far Eastern
G	17	(Philippines)	Jayson Castro (injured)	5 ft 10 in (1.78 m)	185 lb (84 kg)	1986–06–30	Philippine Christian
F/C	21	(United States)	Kelly Williams	6 ft 6 in (1.98 m)	215 lb (98 kg)	1982–02–07	Oakland
F/C	24	(United States)	Rondae Hollis-Jefferson (CI)	6 ft 6 in (1.98 m)	217 lb (98 kg)	1995–01–03	Arizona
F/C	32	(United States)	Henry Galinato	6 ft 6 in (1.98 m)	245 lb (111 kg)		Philippines
G/F	35	(Philippines)	Kim Aurin	6 ft 1 in (1.85 m)	190 lb (86 kg)		UPHSD
F/C	45	(United States)	Brandon Ganuelas-Rosser (injured)	6 ft 6 in (1.98 m)	220 lb (100 kg)	1994–06–29	UC Riverside
F	50	(United States)	CJ Payawal (R)	6 ft 5 in (1.96 m)	190 lb (86 kg)	1997–01–01	UE
G	53	(Philippines)	Chris Exciminiano	6 ft 0 in (1.83 m)	185 lb (84 kg)	1988–11–17	Far Eastern
G	99	(Philippines)	Jielo Razon (R)	5 ft 11 in (1.80 m)			UPHSD

Head coach

- (Philippines) Chot Reyes

Assistant coach(es)

- (Philippines) Josh Reyes (1st assistant)
- (Philippines) Sandy Arespacochaga
- (Philippines) Ranidel de Ocampo
- (Philippines) Yuri Escueta
- (Philippines) Bong Ravena

Team manager

- (Philippines) Jojo Lastimosa
- (Philippines) Yvette Ruiz (assistant)

Legend

- (C) Team captain
- (CI) Commissioner's Cup Import
- (GI) Governors' Cup Import
- (EI) EASL Import
- (DP) Unsigned draft pick
- (FA) Free agent
- (IN) Inactive
- (S) Suspended
- (R) Rookie
- Injured

Roster

Barangay Ginebra San Miguel roster
Players
Coaches

Pos.	#	POB	Name	Height	Weight	DOB (YYYY–MM–DD)	From
G	00	(United States)	Maverick Ahanmisi	6 ft 2 in (1.88 m)	190 lb (86 kg)	1991–07–17	Minnesota
F/C	1	(Philippines)	Troy Rosario	6 ft 7 in (2.01 m)	218 lb (99 kg)	1992–01–20	National-U
G/F	2	(United States)	Jeremiah Gray	6 ft 5 in (1.96 m)	205 lb (93 kg)	1996–08–16	Dominican (CA)
F	3	(United States)	Jamie Malonzo	6 ft 6 in (1.98 m)	210 lb (95 kg)	1996–07–31	De La Salle
G	4	(Philippines)	RJ Abarrientos (R)	5 ft 11 in (1.80 m)	174 lb (79 kg)	1999–09–14	Far Eastern
G	5	(Philippines)	LA Tenorio (C)	5 ft 9 in (1.75 m)	151 lb (68 kg)	1984–07–09	Ateneo
G	6	(United States)	Paul Garcia (R / FA)	5 ft 11 in (1.80 m)	170 lb (77 kg)	1999–06–04	Ateneo
G	9	(Philippines)	Scottie Thompson	6 ft 1 in (1.85 m)	180 lb (82 kg)	1993–07–12	UPHSD
G	10	(Philippines)	John Pinto	5 ft 11 in (1.80 m)	170 lb (77 kg)	1990–10–15	Arellano
F/C	11	(Philippines)	Isaac Go (injured)	6 ft 7 in (2.01 m)	230 lb (104 kg)	1996–06–07	Ateneo
G/F	14	(United States)	Stephen Holt	6 ft 4 in (1.93 m)	195 lb (88 kg)	1991–12–06	Saint Mary's
F	18	(Philippines)	Ralph Cu	6 ft 4 in (1.93 m)	210 lb (95 kg)	1997–03–08	De La Salle
G/F	19	(Philippines)	Von Pessumal	6 ft 2 in (1.88 m)	185 lb (84 kg)	1993–02–12	Ateneo
F	22	(United States)	Jared Dillinger (IN)	6 ft 4 in (1.93 m)	220 lb (100 kg)	1984–01–06	Hawaiʻi
F/C	23	(Philippines)	Raymond Aguilar	6 ft 4 in (1.93 m)	200 lb (91 kg)	1985–07–27	National-U
G/F	24	(Philippines)	Jayson David (FA)	6 ft 2 in (1.88 m)	191 lb (87 kg)	1996–11–08	Lyceum
C	25	(Philippines)	Japeth Aguilar	6 ft 9 in (2.06 m)	235 lb (107 kg)	1987–01–25	Western Kentucky
F	31	(Philippines)	Aljon Mariano	6 ft 3 in (1.91 m)	175 lb (79 kg)	1992–08–03	UST
F	32	(United States)	Justin Brownlee (CI)	6 ft 6 in (1.98 m)	220 lb (100 kg)	1988–04–23	St. John's
F/C	88	(Philippines)	Ben Adamos	6 ft 7 in (2.01 m)	200 lb (91 kg)	1995–12–30	UPHSD

Head coach

- (United States) Tim Cone

Assistant coach(es)

- (Philippines) Richard del Rosario (1st assistant)
- (United States) Kirk Collier
- (Philippines) Patrick Partosa
- (Philippines) Olsen Racela

Team manager

- (Philippines) Alfrancis Chua^{[a]}
- (Philippines) Raymond Rodriguez (assistant)

Legend

- (C) Team captain
- (CI) Commissioner's Cup Import
- (GI) Governors' Cup Import
- (EI) EASL Import
- (DP) Unsigned draft pick
- (FA) Free agent
- (IN) Inactive
- (S) Suspended
- (R) Rookie
- Injured

Roster

- ^{a} Also serves as Barangay Ginebra's board governor.

== Broadcast notes ==
The Commissioner's Cup Finals will be aired live on RPTV with simulcast on PBA Rush and Pilipinas Live (both in standard and high definition).

The PBA Rush broadcast will provide the English language coverage of the Finals.

The Pilipinas Live broadcast will provide the English-Filipino language coverage of the Finals.

Game	RPTV			PBA Rush			Arena Plus Xs and Os
Game	Play-by-play	Analyst(s)	Courtside Reporters	Play-by-play	Analyst	Courtside Reporters	Hosts
Game 1	Magoo Marjon	Quinito Henson and Luigi Trillo	Apple David	Andre Co	Mark Molina	Belle Gregorio	Anton Roxas, Ryan Gregorio and Ronnie Magsanoc
Game 2	Charlie Cuna	Andy Jao and Dominic Uy	Eileen Shi	Anthony Suntay	Ronnie Magsanoc	Belle Gregorio	Anton Roxas, Ryan Gregorio and Nico Salva
Game 3	Jutt Sulit	Quinito Henson and Jong Uichico	Apple David	Carlo Pamintuan	Norman Black	Bea Escudero	Anton Roxas, Ryan Gregorio and Ronnie Magsanoc
Game 4	Magoo Marjon	Jolly Escobar and Ronnie Magsanoc	Belle Gregorio	Jinno Rufino	Vince Hizon	Bea Escudero	Anton Roxas, Ryan Gregorio and Nico Salva
Game 5	Charlie Cuna	Andy Jao and Yeng Guiao	Belle Gregorio	Carlo Pamintuan	Mark Molina	Pauline Verzosa	Magoo Marjon, Ryan Gregorio and Ronnie Magsanoc
Game 6	Sev Sarmenta	Quinito Henson and Andy Jao	Apple David	Carlo Pamintuan	Eric Reyes	Belle Gregorio	
Game 7	Sev Sarmenta	Quinito Henson and Yeng Guiao	Apple David	Carlo Pamintuan	Mark Molina	Bea Escudero	Anton Roxas, Jolly Escobar and Nico Salva

- Additional game 7 crew:
  - Trophy presentation: Jutt Sulit
  - Celebration interviewer: Apple David and Bea Escudero
