= 2026 PBA Commissioner's Cup finals =

Philippine Basketball Association tournament

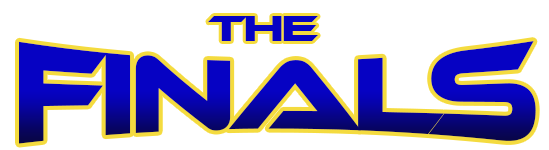
Team	Coach	Wins
(2) Barangay Ginebra San Miguel	Tim Cone	4
(8) TNT Tropang 5G	Chot Reyes	3
- Dates: June 3–17, 2026
- MVP: Scottie Thompson
- Television: RPTV; PBA Rush (HD)
- Streaming: Cignal Play; Pilipinas Live; One Sports YouTube Channel
- Announcers: see Broadcast notes

Referees
- Game 1: Rommel Gruta, Mardy Montoya, Jeffrey Tantay, Jerome Gay
- Game 2: Peter Balao, Mike Flordeliza, Kenny Hallig, Jerome Gay
- Game 3: Rommel Gruta, Mardy Montoya, Jeffrey Tantay, Kenny Hallig
- Game 4: Bing Oliva, Mike Flordeliza, Jerry Narandan, Jerome Gay
- Game 5: Peter Balao, Rommel Gruta, Mike Flordeliza, Jayson Vipinoso
- Game 6: Rommel Gruta, Mardy Montoya, Kenny Hallig, Jayson Vipinoso
- Game 7: Peter Balao, Jerry Narandan, Jeffrey Tantay, Jayson Vipinoso

PBA Commissioner's Cup finals chronology
- < 2024–25

PBA finals chronology
- < 2025–26 Philippine

The 2025–26 Philippine Basketball Association (PBA) Commissioner's Cup finals was the best-of-7 championship series for the 2026 PBA Commissioner's Cup and the conclusion of the conference's playoffs.

The Barangay Ginebra San Miguel and the TNT Tropang 5G competed for the 23rd Commissioner's Cup championship and the 140th overall championship contested by the league. It was the rematch of last year's finals where TNT defeated Barangay Ginebra in 7 games.

Barangay Ginebra dethroned TNT in 7 games to win their 4th Commissioner's Cup title and 16th overall. Scottie Thompson was named the Finals MVP.

== Background ==
=== Barangay Ginebra San Miguel ===
Following a semifinals exit on 2025–26 PBA Philippine Cup, Barangay Ginebra first traded Ben Adamos to the Terrafirma Dyip for Kemark Cariño in a mid-season break trade. They also brought back Justin Brownlee for the Commissioner's Cup.

They started the Elimination round with a win over Macau Black Knights and a loss on NLEX Road Warriors. After 2–2 following a loss on San Miguel Beermen, they went to go on a 5 game winning streak, only to be halted by Meralco Bolts. After 2 wins on Rain or Shine and TNT, they secured the 2nd seed following tiebreakers applied.

In the playoffs, they crushed Phoenix Super LPG in the quarterfinals and advanced to semifinals against Rain or Shine. After losing Game 1, they took Games 2 and 3. After losing by 12 points in Game 4, Barangay Ginebra took Games 5 and 6 in a hard fought series to advance to the finals.

=== TNT Tropang 5G ===
After a run to the Philippine Cup finals, TNT made some changes by adding Avan Nava, Justin Chua, and signing rookie Sean Quitevis out of Ateneo.

They also paraded former NBA center Bol Bol as a reinforcement for the Commissioner's Cup.

In the opener of their campaign, they lost to Rain or Shine in an unexpected manner where Glenn Khobuntin and Jaylen Johnson were ejected after a brawl late in the 4th quarter. TNT would go win in the next two games against NLEX and San Miguel but would lose to Meralco. TNT would go on 3 game winning streak against weak teams, only again to be stopped by Converge in an upset. TNT would go 1–3 in its final 4 games of the eliminations, including a 3 game losing streak and 53 points of Bol against Phoenix, but fell short, which ended their elimination round campaign in 8th seed with 6–6.

In the Quarterfinals, they upset the top seeded NLEX in 2 games. In the semifinals, they faced Meralco for the second straight conference. TNT took Game 1 in a hard fought game. However, tragedy struck when Bol Bol, their import, tore his ACL in the first quarter, which forced them to play all-Filipino the rest of Game 2, but again, they would lose, thus tying the series 1–1. In Game 3 was an all-Filipino line-up where they miraculously won thanks to Roger Pogoy's game winning three pointer to take Game 3.

In Game 4, they paraded former SMB import and champion Chris McCullough. However, they lost. TNT would take Games 5 and 6 in a hard fought manner, thus booking their ticket to the finals as the 2nd team to make the finals as 8th seed since the Powerade Tigers back in 2012.

=== Road to the finals ===
Barangay Ginebra San Miguel		TNT Tropang 5G
Finished 9–3 (.750) in 2nd place with Rain or Shine	Elimination round	Finished 6–6 (.500) in 8th place with Phoenix Super LPG
Head-to-head quotient: Barangay Ginebra 1–0 Rain or Shine (2nd place)	Tiebreaker	Head-to-head quotient: Phoenix Super LPG 1–0 TNT (8th place)
Def. Phoenix Super LPG in one game (twice-to-beat advantage)	Quarterfinals	Def. NLEX in two games (twice-to-beat disadvantage)
Def. Rain or Shine, 4–2	Semifinals	Def. Meralco, 4–2

=== Head-to-head matchup ===
RPTV

May 10
7:30 pm

Box score

Barangay Ginebra San Miguel 93, TNT Tropang 5G 86
Scoring by quarter: 29–26, 27–19, 20–19, 17–22
Pts: Brownlee 18; Rebs: Brownlee 15; Asts: Thompson 7	Pts: Bol 33; Rebs: Bol 10; Asts: Bol, Castro 3

SM Mall of Asia Arena, Pasay
Attendance: 13,967
Referees: Peter Balao, Bing Oliva, Mike Flordeliza, Albert Nubla

== Series summary ==
Game	Date	Venue	Winner	Result
Game 1	June 3	Araneta Coliseum	Barangay Ginebra	102–100
Game 2	June 5	Araneta Coliseum	TNT	101–94
Game 3	June 7	SM Mall of Asia Arena	Barangay Ginebra	116–102
Game 4	June 10	Araneta Coliseum	TNT	106–98
Game 5	June 12	Araneta Coliseum	Barangay Ginebra	100–95 (OT)
Game 6	June 14	Araneta Coliseum	TNT	98–90
Game 7	June 17	SM Mall of Asia Arena	Barangay Ginebra	88–76

== Game summaries ==
=== Game 1 ===
RPTV

June 3
7:30 pm

Box score

Barangay Ginebra San Miguel 102, TNT Tropang 5G 100
Scoring by quarter: 30–25, 27–19, 22–28, 23–28
Pts: Abarrientos 24; Rebs: Rosario 9 Asts: Brownlee 8	Pts: McCullough 25; Rebs: McCullough 14; Asts: Ganuelas-Rosser, McCullough 4
Barangay Ginebra leads series, 1–0

Araneta Coliseum, Quezon City
Attendance: 11,447
Referees: Rommel Gruta, Mardy Montoya, Jeffrey Tantay, Jerome Gay

The 8th seeded TNT started the game leading 4–0. Barangay Ginebra responded back and takes the lead for most of the first quarter and all of the second quarter before taking the biggest lead of the game at 64–46, where TNT starts to make a comeback and retake the lead by 1 in the fourth quarter, 91–90.

RJ Abarrientos of Barangay Ginebra scores two four-pointers in crunch time to retake the lead, but RR Pogoy of TNT ties it at 100. Justin Brownlee scores a two-point game winner with 0.6 seconds remaining, and eventually steal Game 1 from TNT after Calvin Oftana tries to make a shot in 0.6 seconds but missed. Meanwhile, TNT coach Chot Reyes called for a foul on Oftana's shot.

=== Game 2 ===
RPTV

June 5
7:30 pm

Box score

Barangay Ginebra San Miguel 94, TNT Tropang 5G 101
Scoring by quarter: 12–27, 21–21, 26–30, 35–23
Pts: Brownlee 24; Rebs: Brownlee 15; Asts: four players 3	Pts: Oftana 31; Rebs: McCullough 16; Asts: Heading 5
Series tied, 1–1

Araneta Coliseum, Quezon City
Attendance: 11,510
Referees: Peter Balao, Mike Flordeliza, Kenny Hallig, Jerome Gay

TNT held a 22 point lead in the second half before Barangay Ginebra mounted a comeback in the fourth quarter with a 16–6 run. TNT head coach Chot Reyes was heavily surprised on Ginebra's comeback attempt. However, the comeback of Ginebra was unsuccessful as Calvin Oftana scores two free throws to deny Barangay Ginebra a comeback, tying the series.

=== Game 3 ===
RPTV

June 7
7:30 pm

Box score

Barangay Ginebra San Miguel 116, TNT Tropang 5G 102
Scoring by quarter: 35–16, 24–26, 26–26, 31–34
Pts: Brownlee 41; Rebs: Thompson 11; Asts: Thompson 11	Pts: McCullough 44; Rebs: McCullough 13; Asts: Heading 5
Barangay Ginebra leads series, 2–1

SM Mall of Asia Arena, Pasay
Attendance: 18,607
Referees: Rommel Gruta, Mardy Montoya, Jeffrey Tantay, Kenny Hallig

Game 3 of the Commissioner's Cup Finals marked 18,607 fans attending the game, setting the record for the highest attendance at any venue for the league's 50th season. Justin Brownlee of Barangay Ginebra lead the team with 41 points while Stephen Holt scored 23 points and Scottie Thompson registered a triple double with 17 points, 11 rebounds and 11 assists. The trio help Barangay Ginebra avoid a 22-point comeback of TNT. Barangay Ginebra head coach Tim Cone didn't think that everyone realizes how difficult to lead the game early and keep it throughout the game.

Chris McCullough of TNT scored a conference-high 44 points, the highest-scoring performance of any player in the Finals since the 46-point game of Meralco import Allen Durham in the 2016 Governors' Cup Finals, though it wasn't enough to claim the lead to TNT.

=== Game 4 ===
RPTV

June 10
7:35 pm

Box score

Barangay Ginebra San Miguel 98, TNT Tropang 5G 106
Scoring by quarter: 21–16, 32–34, 15–25, 30–31
Pts: Brownlee 32; Rebs: three players 5 Asts: Brownlee 5	Pts: Heading 29; Rebs: McCullough 14; Asts: Heading 8
Series tied, 2–2

Araneta Coliseum, Quezon City
Attendance: 16,823
Referees: Bing Oliva, Mike Flordeliza, Jerry Narandan, Jerome Gay

Prior to the game, Barangay Ginebra's Justin Brownlee claimed his fourth Best Import of the Conference award while his teammate RJ Abarrientos won his first Best Player of the Conference award.

After the awarding of the Best Import and Best Player of the Conference, Barangay Ginebra wanted to win the fourth game for a triple celebration for the night. However, TNT had other plans. Jordan Heading would score five three-pointers, while Chris McCullough scored 19 of his 24 points in the second half. TNT's defense tightened significantly, where Barangay Ginebra only has a shooting percentage of 35.7 in the third quarter.

Despite Justin Brownlee's 32 points and Ginebra's late rally that cuts TNT's lead down to as low as 6 points, it wasn't enough to complete a comeback, and TNT would turn the Finals into a virtual best-of-three.

=== Game 5 ===
RPTV

June 12
7:30 pm

Box score

Barangay Ginebra San Miguel 100, TNT Tropang 5G 95 (OT)
Scoring by quarter: 25–17, 23–33, 17–20, 24–19, Overtime: 11–6
Pts: Brownlee 54; Rebs: Brownlee 14; Asts: Brownlee 5	Pts: McCullough 38; Rebs: McCullough 16; Asts: Castro 6
Barangay Ginebra leads series, 3–2

Araneta Coliseum, Quezon City
Attendance: 18,039
Referees: Peter Balao, Rommel Gruta, Mike Flordeliza, Jayson Vipinoso

Justin Brownlee of Barangay Ginebra scored his career-high 54 points, the highest since Tony Harris of Swift Mighty Meaty Hotdogs, where he scored 58 points in an overtime loss over San Miguel Beermen in Game 3 of the 1993 PBA Governors' Cup finals. Troy Rosario missed an alley-oop off the inbound play with 0.6 seconds in regulation, which prompt the game to overtime, but his team wins in overtime to get an inch closer to the Commissioner's Cup title.

=== Game 6 ===
RPTV

June 14
7:30 pm

Box score

Barangay Ginebra San Miguel 90, TNT Tropang 5G 98
Scoring by quarter: 16–17, 27–28, 24–30, 23–23
Pts: Brownlee 52; Rebs: Rosario 15; Asts: Abarrientos, Thompson 5	Pts: McCullough 53; Rebs: McCullough 22; Asts: Heading 9
Series tied, 3–3

Araneta Coliseum, Quezon City
Attendance: 22,731
Referees: Rommel Gruta, Mardy Montoya, Kenny Hallig, Jayson Vipinoso

With the Commissioner's Cup season on the line, TNT, as an 8th seed, fought hard to force a seventh and deciding game. TNT import Chris McCullough scored a massive 53 points and 22 rebounds, while Justin Brownlee of Ginebra scored 52 points, just a point behind McCullough, following his 54-point game in Game 5. However, he is the only one in the team that hits double figures, with Troy Rosario only scoring 9 points.

TNT will now try to become the next 8th seed to win a championship heading to a do-or-die game.

=== Game 7 ===
RPTV

June 17
7:30 pm

Box score

Barangay Ginebra San Miguel 88, TNT Tropang 5G 76
Scoring by quarter: 18–16, 22–31, 28–16, 20–13
Pts: Brownlee 30; Rebs: Brownlee 14; Asts: Thompson 8	Pts: McCullough 28; Rebs: McCullough 22; Asts: four players 3
Barangay Ginebra wins series, 4–3

SM Mall of Asia Arena, Pasay
Attendance: 24,617
Referees: Peter Balao, Jerry Narandan, Jeffrey Tantay, Jayson Vipinoso

With TNT trying to win the championship as an 8th seed, TNT took control on the first half and until 63–56, where Barangay Ginebra would go on a 12–0 run to retake the lead after gaining a lead at least once in the first half. TNT would miss several shots in the final quarter, which led to Barangay Ginebra winning their first PBA championship since 2022–23 Commissioner's Cup, where they defeated a now–defunct guest team, Bay Area Dragons in 7 games. With 19 points, 11 rebounds and 8 assists on his Game 7, Scottie Thompson was named the Finals MVP.

== Rosters ==
Barangay Ginebra San Miguel roster
Players
Coaches

Pos.	#	POB	Name	Height	Weight	DOB (YYYY–MM–DD)	From
F/C	1	(Philippines)	Troy Rosario	6 ft 7 in (2.01 m)	218 lb (99 kg)	1992–01–20	National-U
G/F	2	(United States)	Jeremiah Gray	6 ft 5 in (1.96 m)	205 lb (93 kg)	1996–08–16	Dominican (CA)
G	4	(Philippines)	RJ Abarrientos	5 ft 11 in (1.80 m)	174 lb (79 kg)	1999–09–14	Far Eastern
G	9	(Philippines)	Scottie Thompson	6 ft 1 in (1.85 m)	180 lb (82 kg)	1993–07–12	UPHSD
G	10	(Philippines)	John Pinto	5 ft 11 in (1.80 m)	170 lb (77 kg)	1990–10–15	Arellano
C	11	(Philippines)	Isaac Go	6 ft 7 in (2.01 m)	230 lb (104 kg)	1996–06–07	Ateneo
G/F	14	(United States)	Stephen Holt	6 ft 4 in (1.93 m)	195 lb (88 kg)	1991–12–06	Saint Mary's
F	18	(Philippines)	Ralph Cu	6 ft 4 in (1.93 m)	210 lb (95 kg)	1997–03–08	De La Salle
F	22	(Philippines)	John Abis (R)	6 ft 3 in (1.91 m)	209 lb (95 kg)	2000–10–14	UPHSD
F/C	23	(Philippines)	Raymond Aguilar	6 ft 4 in (1.93 m)	200 lb (91 kg)	1985–07–27	National-U
G/F	24	(Philippines)	Jayson David (injured)	6 ft 3 in (1.91 m)	191 lb (87 kg)	1996–11–08	Lyceum
C	25	(Philippines)	Japeth Aguilar	6 ft 9 in (2.06 m)	235 lb (107 kg)	1987–01–25	Western Kentucky
F/C	29	(Canada)	Norbert Torres	6 ft 6 in (1.98 m)	250 lb (113 kg)	1990–01–12	De La Salle
F	32	(United States)	Justin Brownlee (CI)	6 ft 6 in (1.98 m)	220 lb (100 kg)	1988–04–23	St. John's
F/C	33	(Philippines)	Kemark Cariño	6 ft 9 in (2.06 m)	203 lb (92 kg)	1998–02–01	San Beda
F	34	(Philippines)	Sonny Estil (R)	6 ft 3 in (1.91 m)		2001–06–28	Letran

Head coach

- (United States) Tim Cone

Assistant coach(es)

- (Philippines) Richard del Rosario (1st assistant)
- (Philippines) Johnny Abarrientos
- (Philippines) Jamil Lipae
- (Philippines) Patrick Partosa
- (Philippines) Olsen Racela

Team manager

- (Philippines) Alfrancis Chua^{[a]}
- (Philippines) Raymond Rodriguez (assistant)

Legend

- (C) Team captain
- (CI) Commissioner's Cup Import
- (GI) Governors' Cup Import
- (EI) EASL Import
- (DP) Unsigned draft pick
- (FA) Free agent
- (IN) Inactive
- (S) Suspended
- (R) Rookie
- Injured

Roster

- ^{a} Also serves as Barangay Ginebra's board governor.

TNT Tropang 5G roster
Players
Coaches

Pos.	#	POB	Name	Height	Weight	DOB (YYYY–MM–DD)	From
G	0	(United States)	Simon Enciso	5 ft 11 in (1.80 m)	185 lb (84 kg)	1991–02–12	Notre Dame de Namur
C	1	(Sudan)	Bol Bol (injured) (CI)	7 ft 3 in (2.21 m)	220 lb (100 kg)	1999–11–16	Oregon
F	2	(United States)	Tyrus Hill (FA)	6 ft 5 in (1.96 m)	185 lb (84 kg)	1996–03–20	De La Salle
F/C	5	(United States)	Chris McCullough (CI)	6 ft 9 in (2.06 m)	201 lb (91 kg)	1995–02–05	Syracuse
G	6	(Philippines)	Rey Nambatac	5 ft 11 in (1.80 m)		1994–01–27	Letran
C	7	(Philippines)	Poy Erram (injured)	6 ft 8 in (2.03 m)	227 lb (103 kg)	1989–07–07	Ateneo
F	8	(Philippines)	Calvin Oftana	6 ft 5 in (1.96 m)	196 lb (89 kg)	1996–01–03	San Beda
F	9	(United States)	Paul Varilla (IN)	6 ft 3 in (1.91 m)		1993–08–10	UE
F	12	(Philippines)	Glenn Khobuntin	6 ft 4 in (1.93 m)	195 lb (88 kg)	1991–09–07	National-U
F	14	(Philippines)	Mike Nieto	6 ft 2 in (1.88 m)	200 lb (91 kg)	1997–05–31	Ateneo
G	15	(Australia)	Jordan Heading	6 ft 2 in (1.88 m)	189 lb (86 kg)	1996–01–30	Cal Baptist
G/F	16	(Philippines)	Roger Pogoy (C)	6 ft 2 in (1.88 m)	180 lb (82 kg)	1992–06–16	Far Eastern
G	17	(Philippines)	Jayson Castro	5 ft 10 in (1.78 m)	185 lb (84 kg)	1986–06–30	Philippine Christian
C	18	(Philippines)	Justin Chua	6 ft 6 in (1.98 m)	245 lb (111 kg)	1989–07–13	Ateneo
F/C	21	(United States)	Kelly Williams	6 ft 7 in (2.01 m)	215 lb (98 kg)	1982–02–07	Oakland
G	27	(Canada)	Avan Nava (FA)	6 ft 2 in (1.88 m)	180 lb (82 kg)	2000–04–04	St. Francis Xavier
G	28	(Philippines)	Jio Jalalon (FA)	5 ft 9 in (1.75 m)	150 lb (68 kg)	1992–08–02	Arellano
G	30	(Philippines)	Sean Quitevis (R)	6 ft 1 in (1.85 m)		1999–09–30	Ateneo
F/C	32	(United States)	Henry Galinato	6 ft 6 in (1.98 m)	245 lb (111 kg)	1997–09–09	Philippines
G/F	35	(Philippines)	Kim Aurin	6 ft 1 in (1.85 m)	190 lb (86 kg)	1997–02–05	UPHSD
F/C	45	(United States)	Brandon Ganuelas-Rosser	6 ft 6 in (1.98 m)	220 lb (100 kg)	1994–06–29	UC Riverside
F	77	(Philippines)	Kevin Ferrer	6 ft 5 in (1.96 m)	188 lb (85 kg)	1993–03–26	UST
F	–	(Philippines)	Joe Celzo (R / IN)	6 ft 4 in (1.93 m)		2000–04–25	San Beda

Head coach

- (Philippines) Chot Reyes

Assistant coach(es)

- (Philippines) Josh Reyes (1st assistant)
- (Philippines) Sandy Arespacochaga
- (Philippines) Ranidel de Ocampo
- (Philippines) Yuri Escueta
- (Philippines) Ryan Reyes
- (Philippines) Bong Ravena

Team manager

- (Philippines) Jojo Lastimosa
- (Philippines) Yvette Ruiz (assistant)

Legend

- (C) Team captain
- (CI) Commissioner's Cup Import
- (GI) Governors' Cup Import
- (EI) EASL Import
- (DP) Unsigned draft pick
- (FA) Free agent
- (IN) Inactive
- (S) Suspended
- (R) Rookie
- Injured

Roster

== Broadcast notes ==
Under the league's partnership with TV5 Network, the series will be aired on RPTV with simulcasts on PBA Rush, Pilipinas Live and One Sports YouTube Channel (both in standard and high definition). The PBA Rush broadcast provided the English language coverage of the finals. The Pilipinas Live also provided the English-Filipino language coverage of the finals.

Game	RPTV			PBA Rush		
Game	Play-by-play	Analyst(s)	Courtside reporter	Play-by-play	Analyst	Courtside reporter
Game 1	Charlie Cuna	Quinito Henson and Luigi Trillo	Eileen Shi	Carlo Pamintuan	Ronnie Magsanoc	Jamie Lim
Game 2	Sev Sarmenta	Andy Jao and Norman Black	Apple David	Andre Co	Eric Altamirano	Eileen Shi
Game 3	Magoo Marjon	Dominic Uy and Jeff Cariaso	Eileen Shi	Anthony Suntay	Mark Molina	Bea Escudero
Game 4	Charlie Cuna	Quinito Henson and Jong Uichico	Bea Escudero	Jutt Sulit	Norman Black	Bea Escudero
Game 5	Sev Sarmenta	Andy Jao and Ronnie Magsanoc	Apple David	Carlo Pamintuan	Mark Molina	Jamie Lim
Game 6	Magoo Marjon	Dominic Uy and Norman Black	Bea Escudero	Andre Co	Eric Reyes	Bea Escudero
Game 7	Charlie Cuna	Quinito Henson and Yeng Guiao	Eileen Shi	Carlo Pamintuan	Ryan Gregorio	Bea Escudero

- Additional crew:
  - Trophy presentation: Jutt Sulit
  - Celebration interviewer: Eileen Shi, Bea Escudero
