= 2025–26 PBA season =

50th season of the Philippine Basketball Association

- Duration: October 5, 2025 – present
- Teams: 12+1
- TV partner(s): RPTV; PBA Rush (HD)
- Streaming partner(s): Cignal Play; One Sports YouTube Channel

PBA season 50
- Top draft pick: Geo Chiu
- Picked by: Terrafirma Dyip
- Philippine Cup champions: San Miguel Beermen
- Philippine Cup runners-up: TNT Tropang 5G
- Commissioner's Cup champions: Barangay Ginebra San Miguel
- Commissioner's Cup runners-up: TNT Tropang 5G

Seasons
- ← 2024–25

The 2025–26 PBA season, also referred to as PBA season 50 or PBA 50, is the 50th season of the Philippine Basketball Association (PBA). The season began on October 5, 2025, and is set to conclude in December 2026.

The first activity of the season was the PBA season 50 draft on September 7, 2025. The Philippine Cup acts as the season-opening conference. This is then followed by the Commissioner's Cup and the season-ending Governors' Cup.

This is also be the first season of competition for the Titan Ultra Giant Risers, after Pureblends Corporation acquired the NorthPort Batang Pier franchise in October.

The 2026 PBA All-Star Weekend was held from March 6 to 8, 2026 in Candon, Ilocos Sur.

== 50th anniversary events ==
The league's golden anniversary celebrations continued into this season. The season logo in gold was unveiled on February 10. There was also a reunion of its 50 greatest players for the opening ceremony, ten of which were added last season.

The league also renamed the Finals Most Valuable Player award, with 19-time champion Ramon Fernandez becoming the award's namesake beginning with the 2025–26 Philippine Cup finals.

The league played international games for the first time since the 2019 season. A selection of games were held in the United Arab Emirates and in Bahrain throughout the season, with a game in Guam also being considered. Also planned are exhibition games against teams from Japan's B.League.

== Season changes ==
The order of the league's three conferences was reverted to the traditional order for the first time since the 2022–23 PBA season. The Philippine Cup was the first conference of the season, after it was held as the last conference in each of the last two seasons. The Commissioner's Cup was the second conference and the Governors' Cup is the season-ending conference. The eighth-seed playoff game no longer be held, meaning that the final playoff berth always be determined by tiebreakers.

Due to the third window of 2027 FIBA Basketball World Cup qualifiers in July 2026 and the 2026 Asian Games in September, the league planned to hold a mid-season pocket tournament which would have featured two foreign teams. Eastern, Macau Black Bears, and a team from Indonesia were among the teams which have expressed interest in taking part after previously seeking to compete in one of the conferences, though the Black Bears would end up joining for the Commissioner's Cup.

=== Rule changes ===
The league introduced ten rule changes effective for this season. The changes are as follows:

Rule changes (effective from the 2025–26 PBA Philippine Cup)
1. The penalty situation applies if a team commits two fouls in the last two minutes of any period, not just the fourth quarter.
2. The technical committee is no longer able to review potential goaltending or basket interference unless it is called by the referees.
3. Two-, three- and four-point field goals can no longer be corrected after the game.
4. Offensive fouls count as team fouls.
5. Throwing the ball at a player's head while in plain sight to prevent a ball from going out of bounds results in a flagrant foul.
6. Excessive elbows result in a technical foul instead of an offensive foul
7. Players can recover their own airball and no longer be called for traveling.
8. Teams lose possession of the ball after calling excessive timeouts.
9. Players are now allowed to huddle during a coach's challenge.
Rule changes (effective from the 2026 PBA Governors' Cup)
1. Jump ball is scrapped in favor of possession arrows to help the Philippines men's national basketball team familiarize itself with the FIBA rules.

Apart from the aforementioned changes, Willie Marcial stated that the four-point line that was added in the previous season remain for "as long as [he's] commissioner."

== Teams ==
The Titan Ultra Giant Risers, a team owned by Pureblends Corporation, joined the league after acquiring the former NorthPort Batang Pier franchise during the off-season. Ahead of the Commissioner's Cup, the Phoenix Fuel Masters reverted their name back to Phoenix Super LPG Fuel Masters.

For guest teams, the Macau Black Knights, who are regular competitors in the East Asia Super League, competed during the Commissioner's Cup, and also returned in the Governors' Cup, rebranding as the Macau Giant Pandas.

Team	Company	Governor	Coach
Barangay Ginebra San Miguel	Ginebra San Miguel, Inc.	Alfrancis Chua	Tim Cone
Blackwater Bossing	Ever Bilena Cosmetics, Inc.	Silliman Sy	Patrick Aquino (interim)
Converge FiberXers	Converge ICT	Archen Cayabyab	Dennis Pineda
Macau Giant Pandas (guest team)	Nenking Group	Jacque Ruby	Marcus Elliott
Magnolia Chicken Timplados Hotshots	San Miguel Food and Beverage, Inc.	Jason Webb	LA Tenorio
Meralco Bolts	Manila Electric Company	William Pamintuan	Luigi Trillo
NLEX Road Warriors	Metro Pacific Investments Corporation	Ronald Dulatre	Jimmy Alapag
Phoenix Super LPG Fuel Masters	Phoenix Petroleum Philippines, Inc.	Raymond Zorrilla	Charles Tiu
Rain or Shine Elasto Painters	Asian Coatings Philippines, Inc.	Mamerto Mondragon	Yeng Guiao
San Miguel Beermen	San Miguel Brewery, Inc.	Robert Non	Leo Austria
Terrafirma Dyip	Terrafirma Realty Development Corporation	Pido Jarencio	Ronald Tubid
Titan Ultra Giant Risers	Pureblends Corporation	Emilio Tiu	Rensy Bajar
TNT Tropang 5G	Smart Communications	Ricky Vargas	Chot Reyes

== Arenas ==
=== Main arenas ===
Arena	Location	Capacity
Ninoy Aquino Stadium	Manila	6,000
Quadricentennial Pavilion	Manila	5,792
SM Mall of Asia Arena	Pasay	15,000
Smart Araneta Coliseum	Quezon City	14,429
Ynares Center II	Rodriguez, Rizal	8,000
Ynares Center	Antipolo, Rizal	7,400

=== Out-of-town arenas ===
Arena	Location	Date	Match-up	Ref.
Chavit Coliseum	Vigan, Ilocos Sur	October 18, 2025	Converge vs. TNT	
Aquilino Q. Pimentel Jr. International Convention Center	Cagayan de Oro	November 15, 2025	Rain or Shine vs. TNT	
Dasmariñas Arena	Dasmariñas, Cavite	November 3, 2026	Rain or Shine vs. Converge	
Dasmariñas Arena	Dasmariñas, Cavite	November 3, 2026	Barangay Ginebra vs. San Miguel	

=== International arenas ===
Arena	Country	Location	Date	Match-up	Ref.
Coca-Cola Arena	United Arab Emirates	Dubai	October 26, 2025	San Miguel vs. Barangay Ginebra	
Khalifa Sports City Arena	Bahrain	Isa Town	December 15, 2025	Magnolia vs. Rain or Shine	
Khalifa Sports City Arena	Bahrain	Isa Town	December 17, 2025	Rain or Shine vs. Barangay Ginebra	

== Transactions ==
=== Retirement ===
- On July 3, 2025, Jared Dillinger officially retired after playing for three teams in his 14 seasons in the league. He was a nine-time PBA champion and was part of the All-Rookie Team in 2009.
- On July 28, 2025, LA Tenorio retired as a full-time player after being tapped by the Magnolia Chicken Timplados Hotshots as its head coach. Tenorio played for three teams in his 18 seasons in the league. He was an eight-time champion, four-time Finals MVP, and four-time Mythical Team selection. While he was listed as a player in the Magnolia roster, he was put under the team's injury/reverse list. On December 20, 2025, he was activated by the Hotshots, becoming a player-coach.
- On September 15, 2025, Sean Anthony officially retired after playing for eight teams in his 14 seasons in the league. He won Defensive Player of the Year in 2019 and was selected to the Mythical Team twice.
- On September 17, 2025, Chris Exciminiano and Ryan Reyes announced their retirements. Exciminiano played for three teams in his 8 seasons in the league, winning three championships and earning two All-Defensive Team selections. Reyes played for two teams in his 17 seasons in the league, winning eight championships and earning four All-Defensive Team selections.
- On October 3, 2025, JVee Casio officially retired after playing for three teams in his 13 seasons in the league. He was a one-time champion with Alaska and was part of the All-Rookie Team in 2012.
- On October 9, 2025, Gabe Norwood announced that he would retire after the 2025–26 PBA Philippine Cup. On December 29, 2025, he officially retired after the Rain or Shine Elasto Painters was eliminated by the Meralco Bolts in a do-or-die game of the quarterfinal round. Norwood played his entire 17 seasons in the PBA with the Rain or Shine Elasto Painters, winning 2 championships and was the Rookie of the Year in 2009, selected to Second Mythical Team, and the All-Rookie Team in 2009, and earning 8 All-Defensive Team selections, including a Defensive Player of the Year award in 2010. He also served as an assistant coach for the team in 2025 up until his retirement.

=== Coaching changes ===
Team	Previous	Replaced by	Ref.
Magnolia Chicken Timplados Hotshots	Chito Victolero	LA Tenorio	
Phoenix Fuel Masters	Jamike Jarin	Willy Wilson	
Terrafirma Dyip	Raymond Tiongco (interim)	Ronald Tubid	
Converge FiberXers	Franco Atienza (interim)	Dennis Pineda	
NorthPort Batang Pier / Titan Ultra Giant Risers	Bonnie Tan	Johnedel Cardel	
Phoenix Super LPG Fuel Masters	Willy Wilson	Charles Tiu	
Titan Ultra Giant Risers	Johnedel Cardel	Rensy Bajar	
Macau Black Knights (guest team)	Garrett Kelly	Marcus Elliott	
Blackwater Bossing	Jeffrey Cariaso	Patrick Aquino (interim)	
NLEX Road Warriors	Jong Uichico	Jimmy Alapag	

== Notable events ==
=== Off-season ===
- July 17, 2025: The PBA approved a new rule that would ban players from playing in the league for three years if they play in other leagues, domestic or international, following the expiration of their contracts. The rule, however, wasn't reported until a month later in August. Players are exempt from the rule if were unrestricted free agents released by the team, not offered a new contract by the team they played in the previous season within 30 days of the expiration of their previous contract, or have played in the PBA for seven full seasons (21 conferences).
- July 18, 2025: The franchise sale of the Terrafirma Dyip was dropped after the team and the organization behind the Zamboanga Valientes mutually agreed to no longer push through with the acquisition. Despite the failed sale, Terrafirma continued to compete through this season.

=== Pre-season ===
- September 4, 2025: The ban imposed on Larry Muyang has been lifted after he was traded from Phoenix Fuel Masters to Converge FiberXers.
- September 10, 2025: Willie Marcial and Ricky Vargas have retained their positions as the league's commissioner and chairman, respectively.
- September 16, 2025: The PBA approved a new rule that prohibit future first overall picks from being traded for two seasons after they were drafted. Geo Chiu, the first overall pick in the season 50 draft, was the first player covered by this new rule.
- September 26, 2025: The Meralco Bolts unveiled a new logo, which is a simplified version of their previous mark. The team's new dark uniforms were unveiled the same day, featuring a new black base with blue accents across the jersey. A white version is worn as the light uniform. Additionally, the 1971 Meralco Reddy Kilowatts jerseys, which were worn last season during the 50th anniversary games, was added to the regular jersey rotation.
- October 1, 2025: Pureblends Corporation's sale of the NorthPort Batang Pier was completed. The team rebranded as the Titan Ultra Giant Risers.

=== Philippine Cup ===
- October 8, 2025: Titan Ultra played their first game as a franchise. They also got their first win as a franchise, a 100–96 victory against Meralco.
- November 8, 2025: The PBA announced that the games between the TNT vs. Magnolia and the Barangay Ginebra vs. Titan Ultra on November 9 were postponed due to Typhoon Uwan (Fung-wong). The said games were later postponed again to December 21, 6 weeks after, with TNT defeating Magnolia in the first game and Barangay Ginebra defeating Titan Ultra in the second game.
- January 9, 2026: TNT retired the jersey number of Ranidel de Ocampo (No. 33) during the halftime of Game 3 of the semifinals matchup against Meralco.
- January 12, 2026: Converge players Justine Baltazar, Mark Omega, and assistant coach Humperdink Dimatulac were all fined ₱20,000 each (totalling ₱60,000) for their "cooking" gestures during the quarterfinals against Barangay Ginebra.
- January 20, 2026: The PBA approved a new rule that starting in 2027, rookie prospects with existing contracts in other leagues would not be allowed to apply for the PBA draft.

=== Mid-season ===
- February 6, 2026: The PBA announced that the Macau Black Knights would join the 2026 PBA Commissioner's Cup as a guest team.
- June 19, 2026: The PBA announced that Macau would return as a guest team for the 2026 PBA Governors' Cup and renaming themselves as Macau Giant Pandas.
- June 23, 2026: The PBA announced that starting from 2026 PBA Governors' Cup, the possession arrow would be applied instead of jump ball to help Gilas Pilipinas familiarize itself with the FIBA rules.

=== Commissioner's Cup ===
- March 20 & 21, 2026: TNT forward Glenn Khobuntin and Rain or Shine import Jaylen Johnson were involved in a brawl in the game between the TNT vs. Rain or Shine. Both players were ejected as punches were thrown. On March 21, the PBA announced that Khobuntin was fined ₱70,000 and would be suspended by 2 games while Johnson was fined ₱50,000 and would be suspended by 1 game.
- April 10, 2026: Rain or Shine retired the jersey number of Gabe Norwood (No. 5) during the halftime of their game against Converge.
- April 12, 2026: The game between the Phoenix Super LPG vs. Barangay Ginebra was temporarily halted in the first quarter as fire hit the parts of the general admission and upper box sections of the Araneta Coliseum. After five minutes, the game resumed.

=== Governors' Cup ===
- August 9, 2026: The PBA announced that the games between the Phoenix Super LPG vs. Rain or Shine and the Barangay Ginebra vs. Blackwater on August 9 had been postponed due to severe weather conditions. Also the venues of the games on August 11 between the Converge vs. Terrafirma and the NLEX vs. TNT had been moved from Ninoy Aquino Stadium to Ynares Center Antipolo.

== Opening ceremony ==
The opening ceremony was held on October 5, 2025, at the Smart Araneta Coliseum in Quezon City. This is preceded by the annual PBA Leo Awards, which took place at Novotel Manila Araneta City. As part of the league's golden season, a grand reunion of its living 50 Greatest Players (10 of which were added last season) was held. Manila Clasico was the first game of the Philippine Cup and the season as a whole, with Magnolia Chicken Timplados Hotshots beating Barangay Ginebra San Miguel, 80–73.

Below is the list of team muses:

Team	Muse
Barangay Ginebra San Miguel	Sue Ramirez
Blackwater Bossing	Chelsea Fernandez
Converge FiberXers	Salma Emam
Magnolia Chicken Timplados Hotshots	Ahtisa Manalo
Meralco Bolts	Chelsea Manalo
NLEX Road Warriors	Pearl Gonzales
Phoenix Fuel Masters	Pauline Gaston
Rain or Shine Elasto Painters	Pattie Paraiso
San Miguel Beermen	Caroline Eyer
Terrafirma Dyip	Eloisa Jaud
Titan Ultra Giant Risers	Myrna Esguerra
TNT Tropang 5G	Savi Davison
TNT Tropang 5G	Mika Reyes
TNT Tropang 5G	Kim Kianna Dy
TNT Tropang 5G	Majoy Baron
TNT Tropang 5G	Jessey de Leon

== 2025–26 PBA Philippine Cup ==
The first conference of the season was the Philippine Cup, which began on October 5, 2025, and ended on February 1, 2026.

=== Elimination round standings ===
Pos	Team	W	L	PCT	GB	Qualification
1	San Miguel Beermen	9	2	.818	—	Twice-to-beat in the quarterfinals
2	Rain or Shine Elasto Painters	8	3	.727 (Note: Head-to-head record: Rain or Shine 1–0 TNT)	1	Twice-to-beat in the quarterfinals
3	TNT Tropang 5G	8	3	.727	1	Twice-to-beat in the quarterfinals
4	Converge FiberXers	7	4	.636 (Note: Head-to-head record: Converge 1–0 Barangay Ginebra)	2	Twice-to-beat in the quarterfinals
5	Barangay Ginebra San Miguel	7	4	.636	2	Twice-to-win in the quarterfinals
6	Magnolia Chicken Timplados Hotshots	6	5	.545 (Note: Head-to-head quotient: Magnolia 1.09, Meralco 0.99, NLEX 0.93)	3	Twice-to-win in the quarterfinals
7	Meralco Bolts	6	5	.545	3	Twice-to-win in the quarterfinals
8	NLEX Road Warriors	6	5	.545	3	Twice-to-win in the quarterfinals
9	Titan Ultra Giant Risers	4	7	.364	5	
10	Phoenix Fuel Masters	3	8	.273	6	
11	Blackwater Bossing	1	10	.091 (Note: Head-to-head record: Blackwater 1–0 Terrafirma)	8	
12	Terrafirma Dyip	1	10	.091	8	

Source: PBA.ph
Rules for classification: 1) winning percentage; 2) head-to-head goal average (quotient); 3) head-to-head record; 4) overall quotient; 5) coin toss

=== Playoffs ===
Quarterfinals (Top 4 twice-to-beat)
1	San Miguel	101
8	NLEX	94
4	Converge	85	98
5	Barangay Ginebra	105	99*
2	Rain or Shine	79	89
7	Meralco	96	98
3	TNT	118
6	Magnolia	109

Semifinals (Best-of-7)
1	San Miguel	4
5	Barangay Ginebra	2
7	Meralco	1
3	TNT	4

Finals (Best-of-7)
1	San Miguel	4
3	TNT	2

*Game went into overtime

==== Quarterfinals ====
Team 1	Series	Team 2	Game 1	Game 2
(1) San Miguel Beermen*	1–0	(8) NLEX Road Warriors	101–94	—
(2) Rain or Shine Elasto Painters*	0–2	(7) Meralco Bolts	79–96	89–98
(3) TNT Tropang 5G*	1–0	(6) Magnolia Chicken Timplados Hotshots	118–109	—
(4) Converge FiberXers*	0–2	(5) Barangay Ginebra San Miguel	85–105	98–99 (OT)

*Team has twice-to-beat advantage. Team 1 only has to win once, while Team 2 has to win twice.

==== Semifinals ====
Team 1	Series	Team 2	Game 1	Game 2	Game 3	Game 4	Game 5	Game 6	Game 7
(1) San Miguel Beermen	4–2	(5) Barangay Ginebra San Miguel	90–99	93–84	91–85	91–105	115–109	101–88	—
(3) TNT Tropang 5G	4–1	(7) Meralco Bolts	100–95	109–92	89–97	102–83	99–96	—	—

==== Finals ====
Team 1	Series	Team 2	Game 1	Game 2	Game 3	Game 4	Game 5	Game 6	Game 7
(1) San Miguel Beermen	4–2	(3) TNT Tropang 5G	91–96	111–92	95–89	87–110	96–82	92–77	—

- Ramon Fernandez Finals MVP: June Mar Fajardo (San Miguel Beermen)
- Best Player of the Conference: June Mar Fajardo (San Miguel Beermen)

== 2026 PBA Commissioner's Cup ==
The second conference of the season was the Commissioner's Cup, which began on March 11, 2026, and ended on June 17.

=== Elimination round standings ===
Pos	Team	W	L	PCT	GB	Qualification
1	NLEX Road Warriors	10	2	.833	—	Twice-to-beat in the quarterfinals
2	Barangay Ginebra San Miguel	9	3	.750 (Note: Head-to-head record: Barangay Ginebra 1–0 Rain or Shine)	1	Twice-to-beat in the quarterfinals
3	Rain or Shine Elasto Painters	9	3	.750	1	Twice-to-beat in the quarterfinals
4	Meralco Bolts	8	4	.667	2	Twice-to-beat in the quarterfinals
5	Magnolia Chicken Timplados Hotshots	7	5	.583 (Note: Head-to-head record: Magnolia 1–0 San Miguel)	3	Twice-to-win in the quarterfinals
6	San Miguel Beermen	7	5	.583	3	Twice-to-win in the quarterfinals
7	Phoenix Super LPG Fuel Masters	6	6	.500 (Note: Head-to-head record: Phoenix Super LPG 1–0 TNT)	4	Twice-to-win in the quarterfinals
8	TNT Tropang 5G	6	6	.500	4	Twice-to-win in the quarterfinals
9	Converge FiberXers	5	7	.417	5	
10	Terrafirma Dyip	4	8	.333	6	
11	Macau Black Knights (G)	3	9	.250	7	
12	Titan Ultra Giant Risers	2	10	.167 (Note: Head-to-head record: Titan Ultra 1–0 Blackwater)	8	
13	Blackwater Bossing	2	10	.167	8	

Source: PBA.ph
Rules for classification: 1) winning percentage; 2) head-to-head goal average (quotient); 3) head-to-head record; 4) overall quotient; 5) coin toss
(G) Guests

=== Playoffs ===
Quarterfinals (Top 4 twice-to-beat)
1	NLEX	93	112
8	TNT	96	118
4	Meralco	89	105
5	Magnolia	95	102*
2	Barangay Ginebra	112
7	Phoenix Super LPG	81
3	Rain or Shine	113
6	San Miguel	104

Semifinals (Best-of-7)
8	TNT	4
4	Meralco	2
2	Barangay Ginebra	4
3	Rain or Shine	2

Finals (Best-of-7)
8	TNT	3
2	Barangay Ginebra	4

*Game went into overtime

==== Quarterfinals ====
Team 1	Series	Team 2	Game 1	Game 2
(1) NLEX Road Warriors*	0–2	(8) TNT Tropang 5G	93–96	112–118
(2) Barangay Ginebra San Miguel*	1–0	(7) Phoenix Super LPG Fuel Masters	112–81	—
(3) Rain or Shine Elasto Painters*	1–0	(6) San Miguel Beermen	113–104	—
(4) Meralco Bolts*	1–1	(5) Magnolia Chicken Timplados Hotshots	89–95	105–102 (OT)

*Team has twice-to-beat advantage. Team 1 only has to win once, while Team 2 has to win twice.

==== Semifinals ====
Team 1	Series	Team 2	Game 1	Game 2	Game 3	Game 4	Game 5	Game 6	Game 7
(2) Barangay Ginebra San Miguel	4–2	(3) Rain or Shine Elasto Painters	111–115	109–101	103–98	85–97	111–104	118–107	—
(4) Meralco Bolts	2–4	(8) TNT Tropang 5G	89–94	87–76	75–77	101–90	95–103	94–97	—

==== Finals ====
Team 1	Series	Team 2	Game 1	Game 2	Game 3	Game 4	Game 5	Game 6	Game 7
(2) Barangay Ginebra San Miguel	4–3	(8) TNT Tropang 5G	102–100	94–101	116–102	98–106	100–95 (OT)	90–98	88–76

- Ramon Fernandez Finals MVP: Scottie Thompson (Barangay Ginebra San Miguel)
- Best Player of the Conference: RJ Abarrientos (Barangay Ginebra San Miguel)
- Bobby Parks Best Import of the Conference: Justin Brownlee (Barangay Ginebra San Miguel)

== 2026 PBA Governors' Cup ==
The third and final conference of the season is the Govenors Cup which began on July 10, 2026.

=== Team standings ===
==== Group A ====
Pos	Team	W	L	PCT	GB	Qualification
1	NLEX Road Warriors	9	3	.750 (Note: Head-to-head quotient: NLEX 1.05, San Miguel 0.95)	—	Quarterfinals
2	San Miguel Beermen	9	3	.750	—	Quarterfinals
3	Converge FiberXers	8	4	.667	1	Quarterfinals
4	TNT Tropang 5G	7	5	.583	2	Quarterfinals
5	Terrafirma Dyip	5	7	.417	4	
6	Macau Giant Pandas (G)	2	10	.167 (Note: Head-to-head quotient: Macau 1.01, Titan Ultra 0.99)	7	
7	Titan Ultra Giant Risers	2	10	.167	7	

Source: PBA.ph
Rules for classification: 1) winning percentage; 2) head-to-head quotient (goal average); 3) head-to-head record; 4) coin toss
(G) Guests

==== Group B ====
Pos	Team	W	L	PCT	GB	Qualification
1	Magnolia Chicken Timplados Hotshots	7	3	.700	—	Quarterfinals
2	Rain or Shine Elasto Painters	6	4	.600	1	Quarterfinals
3	Barangay Ginebra San Miguel	5	5	.500 (Note: Head-to-head quotient: Barangay Ginebra 1.08, Phoenix Super LPG 0.92)	2	Quarterfinals
4	Phoenix Super LPG Fuel Masters	5	5	.500	2	Quarterfinals
5	Meralco Bolts	4	6	.400	3	
6	Blackwater Bossing	3	7	.300	4	

Source: PBA.ph
Rules for classification: 1) winning percentage; 2) head-to-head quotient (goal average); 3) head-to-head record; 4) coin toss

=== Playoffs ===
Quarterfinals (Best-of-5)
A1	NLEX	3
B4	Phoenix Super LPG	0
B2	Rain or Shine	1
A3	Converge	3
B1	Magnolia	0
A4	TNT	3
A2	San Miguel	2
B3	Barangay Ginebra	3

Semifinals (Best-of-5)
A1	NLEX	0
A3	Converge	0
A4	TNT	0
B3	Barangay Ginebra	0

Finals (Best-of-7)
A

==== Quarterfinals ====
Team 1	Series	Team 2	Game 1	Game 2	Game 3	Game 4	Game 5
(A1) NLEX Road Warriors	3–0	(B4) Phoenix Super LPG Fuel Masters	97–92	124–117	137–89	—	—
(B1) Magnolia Chicken Timplados Hotshots	0–3	(A4) TNT Tropang 5G	70–92	73–91	87–98	—	—
(A2) San Miguel Beermen	2–3	(B3) Barangay Ginebra San Miguel	95–104	99–126	101–98	108–102	94–110
(B2) Rain or Shine Elasto Painters	1–3	(A3) Converge FiberXers	124–120	125–130	89–105	109–120	—

==== Semifinals ====
Team 1	Series	Team 2	Game 1	Game 2	Game 3	Game 4	Game 5
(A1) NLEX Road Warriors	–	(A3) Converge FiberXers	—	—	—	—	—
(B3) Barangay Ginebra San Miguel	–	(A4) TNT Tropang 5G	—	—	—	—	—

== PBA team in Asian club competitions ==
Team	Competition	Progress	Ref.
Meralco Bolts	2025–26 East Asia Super League	Eliminated in group stage	

== Media ==
This is the fifteenth consecutive season of the PBA's broadcast partnership with TV5., and the third consecutive season on RPTV, while the league-dedicated PBA Rush continue to broadcast its own feed. Cignal Play, Pilipinas Live and One Sports Youtube channel continued to stream all games.
