= 2024–25 PBA season =

49th PBA season

- Duration: August 18, 2024 – July 25, 2025
- Teams: 12+1
- TV partner(s): Local: RPTV; PBA Rush (HD); International: Pilipinas Live; Online: Cignal Play; Pilipinas Live

PBA season 49
- Top draft pick: Justine Baltazar
- Picked by: Converge FiberXers
- Season MVP: June Mar Fajardo (San Miguel Beermen)
- Top scorer: Arvin Tolentino (NorthPort Batang Pier)
- Governors' Cup champions: TNT Tropang Giga
- Governors' Cup runners-up: Barangay Ginebra San Miguel
- Commissioner's Cup champions: TNT Tropang Giga
- Commissioner's Cup runners-up: Barangay Ginebra San Miguel
- Philippine Cup champions: San Miguel Beermen
- Philippine Cup runners-up: TNT Tropang 5G

Seasons
- ← 2023–24 2025–26 →

The 2024–25 PBA season, also referred to as PBA season 49, was the 49th season of the Philippine Basketball Association (PBA). The season began on August 18, 2024 and concluded on July 25, 2025.

The first activity of the season was the PBA season 49 draft, held on July 14. The league then reverted to a three-conference format starting with the Governors' Cup after being omitted last season. This was then followed by the Commissioner's Cup and the season-ending Philippine Cup, the latter also coincided with the league's 50th anniversary. The first two conferences allows an import per team while the last tournament is exclusive to Filipinos.

This was also the final season of competition for the NorthPort Batang Pier, as the franchise was acquired by Pureblends Corporation, becoming the Titan Ultra Giant Risers beginning with the 2025–26 season.

== 50th anniversary events ==
This season, the PBA began the celebration of its 50th anniversary with events that will continue through the following 2025–26 season, the league's 50th season. On April 2, 2025, ten players were added to the Greatest Players List, expanding the list to the 50 Greatest Players in PBA History.

On April 9, 2025, the exact date of the league's golden anniversary, two games of this season's Philippine Cup were held at the Rizal Memorial Coliseum. In the latter game, the Meralco Bolts and San Miguel Beermen wore throwback jerseys honoring their company's basketball history.

== Season changes ==
In order to help the league and its teams prepare for international competitions such as the East Asia Super League and Basketball Champions League Asia, the league's traditional conference order was reversed to have the two import-laden conferences played first. Those two conferences also saw format changes this season, which were as follows:

- The Governors' Cup now have teams be divided into two groups, where each group is expected to follow a double round-robin elimination format. The top 4 teams in each group advance to the playoffs beginning with the crossover quarterfinals.
- While the Governors' Cup's height limit for imports still stands at 6 ft 6 in (198 cm), the Commissioner's Cup's height limit of 6 ft 10 in (208 cm) is scrapped outright.

Similar to the previous season, the Philippine Cup will remain as the season-culminating conference.

== Executive board ==
- Commissioner: Willie Marcial
- Chairman: Ricky Vargas (Representing TNT Tropang 5G)
- Vice-Chairman: Alfrancis Chua (Representing Barangay Ginebra San Miguel)
- Treasurer: Raymond Zorrilla (Representing Phoenix Fuel Masters)

== Teams ==
Changes from previous season:

- Eastern played as a guest team for the Commissioner's Cup.

Team	Company	Governor	Coach	Captain
Barangay Ginebra San Miguel	Ginebra San Miguel, Inc.	Alfrancis Chua	Tim Cone	LA Tenorio
Blackwater Bossing	Ever Bilena Cosmetics, Inc.	Silliman Sy	Jeffrey Cariaso	
Converge FiberXers	Converge ICT	Archen Cayabyab	Franco Atienza	Kevin Racal
Eastern (guest team)	Eastern Sports Club	—	Mensur Bajramović	
Magnolia Chicken Timplados Hotshots	San Miguel Food and Beverage, Inc.	Rene Pardo	Chito Victolero	Rafi Reavis
Meralco Bolts	Manila Electric Company	Al Panlilio	Luigi Trillo	Chris Newsome
NLEX Road Warriors	Metro Pacific Investments Corporation	Rodrigo Franco	Jong Uichico	Robert Bolick
NorthPort Batang Pier	Sultan 900 Capital, Inc.	Eric Arejola	Bonnie Tan	Joshua Munzon
Phoenix Fuel Masters	Phoenix Petroleum Philippines, Inc.	Raymond Zorrilla	Jamike Jarin	RJ Jazul
Rain or Shine Elasto Painters	Asian Coatings Philippines, Inc.	Mamerto Mondragon	Yeng Guiao	Beau Belga
San Miguel Beermen	San Miguel Brewery, Inc.	Robert Non	Jorge Gallent	CJ Perez
Terrafirma Dyip	Terrafirma Realty Development Corporation	Demosthenes Rosales	Raymond Tiongco	
TNT Tropang 5G	Smart Communications	Ricky Vargas	Chot Reyes	Roger Pogoy

== Arenas ==
=== Main arenas ===
Arena	City	Capacity
Smart Araneta Coliseum	Quezon City	14,429
Ninoy Aquino Stadium	Manila	6,000
PhilSports Arena	Pasig	10,000
Rizal Memorial Coliseum	Manila	6,100
SM Mall of Asia Arena	Pasay	20,000
Ynares Center	Antipolo, Rizal	7,400
Ynares Center II	Rodriguez, Rizal	8,000

=== Out-of-town arenas ===
Arena	City/Town	Date	Match-up
Candon City Arena	Candon, Ilocos Sur	August 24, 2024	Rain or Shine vs. Barangay Ginebra
Candon City Arena	Candon, Ilocos Sur	January 18, 2025	San Miguel vs. Meralco
Candon City Arena	Candon, Ilocos Sur	May 24, 2025	Magnolia vs. NorthPort
Aquilino Q. Pimentel Jr. International Convention Center	Cagayan de Oro	August 31, 2024	San Miguel vs. NLEX
Aquilino Q. Pimentel Jr. International Convention Center	Cagayan de Oro	June 7, 2025	Rain or Shine vs. San Miguel
Panabo City Multi-Purpose Tourism Cultural and Sports Center	Panabo, Davao del Norte	September 7, 2024	Meralco vs. Magnolia
Santa Rosa Sports Complex	Santa Rosa, Laguna	September 27, 2024	Rain or Shine vs. Magnolia
Santa Rosa Sports Complex	Santa Rosa, Laguna	September 27, 2024	NLEX vs. TNT
Dasmariñas Arena	Dasmariñas, Cavite	October 13, 2024	San Miguel vs. Barangay Ginebra
Dasmariñas Arena	Dasmariñas, Cavite	October 13, 2024	Rain or Shine vs. TNT
Batangas City Sports Center	Batangas City, Batangas	December 21, 2024	Converge vs. Barangay Ginebra
Zamboanga City Coliseum	Zamboanga City	April 26, 2025	Magnolia vs. Phoenix
Bren Z. Guiao Convention Center	San Fernando, Pampanga	May 10, 2025	Converge vs. Barangay Ginebra

== Transactions ==
=== Retirement ===
- On February 24, 2025, Alex Cabagnot formally retired after being signed by the UE Red Warriors as one of its assistant coaches. Cabagnot played for seven teams in his 18 seasons in the league.

=== Coaching changes ===
Team	Previous	Replaced by	Ref.
NLEX Road Warriors	Frankie Lim	Jong Uichico	
Converge FiberXers	Aldin Ayo	Franco Atienza (interim)	
Terrafirma Dyip	Johnedel Cardel	Raymond Tiongco (interim)	
San Miguel Beermen	Jorge Gallent	Leo Austria	

== Rule changes ==
After being used in the 2023 and 2024 All-Star Weekends, the league will integrate the four-point line as part of regular play. The four-point line is set to be 8.2 meters (27 ft) away from the basket, which makes it 1.52 meters (5.0 ft) further than the three-point line.

== Notable events ==
=== 2024 PBA Governors' Cup ===
- September 15: During a game against Barangay Ginebra, Marcio Lassiter scored 4 triples to surpass Jimmy Alapag (1,250) to become the league's all-time three point scoring leader.

=== 2025 PBA Philippine Cup ===
- TNT Tropang Giga silently renamed their monicker to TNT Tropang 5G. Additionally, they unveiled a brand new logo and began wearing their new jerseys, which are used in their first game this conference. The name change was effective in this conference when they won the Commissioner's Cup.
- April 9 - The league celebrated its 50th foundation anniversary by playing two games at the Rizal Memorial Coliseum, one of their primary venues from 1975 to 1984. Ticket prices were reduced to P50 in the lower box section and P35 for the upper box section. Converge and Magnolia played the first game, while San Miguel and Meralco played in the main game. The 2nd game was billed as a "retro game". San Miguel wore their throwback 1982 jerseys while Meralco wore their 1971 retro jerseys they wore during their participation in the MICAA.
- April 11 - A gala night was held at the Solaire Resort North to honor the 10 players added to the 50 greatest players in league history.
- April 14 - PBA Commissioner Willie Marcial sanctioned Phoenix Fuel Masters player Larry Muyang with an indefinite ban for breaching his live contract with the team by playing with the Pampanga Giant Lanterns of the MPBL.

== Opening ceremonies ==
The opening ceremonies for this season hold at Smart Araneta Coliseum on August 18, 2024. The PBA Leo Awards for the 2023–24 season hold before the opening ceremonies.

The first game of the Governors' Cup between the Meralco Bolts and the Magnolia Chicken Timplados Hotshots will be played after the opening ceremonies.

Below is the list of team muses:

Team	Muse
Barangay Ginebra San Miguel	Julie Anne San Jose
Blackwater Bossing	Krishnah Gravidez
Converge FiberXers	Myrtle Sarrosa
Magnolia Chicken Timplados Hotshots	Rere Madrid
Meralco Bolts	Aleah Finnegan
NLEX Road Warriors	Inday Fatima
NorthPort Batang Pier	Skye Chua
Phoenix Fuel Masters	Jema Galanza
Rain or Shine Elasto Painters	Sophia Bianca Santos
San Miguel Beermen	Jamie Lim
Terrafirma Dyip	Annabelle McDonnell
TNT Tropang Giga	Atasha Muhlach

== 2024 PBA Governors' Cup ==
The 2024 PBA Governors' Cup started on August 18 and ended on November 8, 2024.

=== Elimination round ===
==== Group A ====
Pos	Team	W	L	PCT	GB	Qualification
1	TNT Tropang Giga	8	2	.800	—	Quarterfinals
2	Meralco Bolts	7	3	.700	1	Quarterfinals
3	Converge FiberXers	6	4	.600	2	Quarterfinals
4	Magnolia Chicken Timplados Hotshots	5	5	.500	3	Quarterfinals
5	NorthPort Batang Pier	3	7	.300	5	
6	Terrafirma Dyip	1	9	.100	7	

Source: PBA.ph
Rules for classification: 1) winning percentage; 2) if two teams are tied, head-to-head record, if three or more teams are tied, head-to-head goal average (quotient); 3) overall quotient; 4) coin toss

==== Group B ====
Pos	Team	W	L	PCT	GB	Qualification
1	Rain or Shine Elasto Painters	7	3	.700	—	Quarterfinals
2	San Miguel Beermen	6	4	.600 (Note: Head-to-head record: San Miguel 1–1 Barangay Ginebra (San Miguel 1.23, Barangay Ginebra 0.82))	1	Quarterfinals
3	Barangay Ginebra San Miguel	6	4	.600	1	Quarterfinals
4	NLEX Road Warriors	5	5	.500 (Note: Head-to-head record: NLEX 1–1 Blackwater (NLEX 1.03, Blackwater 0.97))	2	Quarterfinals
5	Blackwater Bossing	5	5	.500	2	
6	Phoenix Fuel Masters	1	9	.100	6	

Source: PBA.ph
Rules for classification: 1) winning percentage; 2) if two teams are tied, head-to-head record, if three or more teams are tied, head-to-head goal average (quotient); 3) overall quotient; 4) coin toss

=== Playoffs ===
Quarterfinals (Best-of-5)
A1	TNT	3
B4	NLEX	1
B1	Rain or Shine	3
A4	Magnolia	2
B2	San Miguel	3
A3	Converge	2
A2	Meralco	0
B3	Barangay Ginebra	3

Semifinals (Best-of-7)
A1	TNT	4
B1	Rain or Shine	1
B2	San Miguel	2
B3	Barangay Ginebra	4

Finals (Best-of-7)
A1	TNT	4
B3	Barangay Ginebra	2

==== Quarterfinals ====
Team 1	Series	Team 2	Game 1	Game 2	Game 3	Game 4	Game 5
(A1) TNT Tropang Giga	3–1	(B4) NLEX Road Warriors	107–102	90–93	109–94	125–96	—
(B1) Rain or Shine Elasto Painters	3–2	(A4) Magnolia Chicken Timplados Hotshots	109–105	69–121	111–106 (OT)	100–129	113–103
(B2) San Miguel Beermen	3–2	(A3) Converge FiberXers	102–95	107–100	112–114	110–114	109–105
(A2) Meralco Bolts	0–3	(B3) Barangay Ginebra San Miguel	92–99	103–104	106–113	—	—

==== Semifinals ====
Team 1	Series	Team 2	Game 1	Game 2	Game 3	Game 4	Game 5	Game 6	Game 7
(A1) TNT Tropang Giga	4–1	(B1) Rain or Shine Elasto Painters	90–81	108–91	109–110	81–79	113–95	—	—
(B2) San Miguel Beermen	2–4	(B3) Barangay Ginebra San Miguel	105–122	131–125 (OT)	94–99	131–121	92–121	99–102	—

==== Finals ====
Team 1	Series	Team 2	Game 1	Game 2	Game 3	Game 4	Game 5	Game 6	Game 7
(A1) TNT Tropang Giga	4–2	(B3) Barangay Ginebra San Miguel	104–88	96–84	73–85	92–106	99–72	95–85	—

- Finals MVP: Jayson Castro (TNT Tropang Giga)
- Best Player of the Conference: June Mar Fajardo (San Miguel Beermen)
- Bobby Parks Best Import of the Conference: Rondae Hollis-Jefferson (TNT Tropang Giga)

== 2024–25 PBA Commissioner's Cup ==
The 2024–25 PBA Commissioner's Cup started on November 27, 2024, and ended on March 28, 2025.

=== Elimination round ===
Pos	Team	W	L	PCT	GB	Qualification
1	NorthPort Batang Pier	9	3	.750	—	Twice-to-beat in the quarterfinals
2	TNT Tropang Giga	8	4	.667 (Note: Head-to-head quotient: TNT 1.04, Converge 1.03, Barangay Ginebra 0.94)	1	Twice-to-beat in the quarterfinals
3	Converge FiberXers	8	4	.667	1	Best-of-three quarterfinals
4	Barangay Ginebra San Miguel	8	4	.667	1	Best-of-three quarterfinals
5	Meralco Bolts	7	5	.583 (Note: Head-to-head quotient: Meralco 1.08, Rain or Shine 1.04, Eastern 0.88)	2	Best-of-three quarterfinals
6	Rain or Shine Elasto Painters	7	5	.583	2	Best-of-three quarterfinals
7	Eastern (G)	7	5	.583	2	Twice-to-win in the quarterfinals
8	Magnolia Chicken Timplados Hotshots	6	6	.500 (Note: Eighth seed playoff: Magnolia 112–81 NLEX)	3	Twice-to-win in the quarterfinals
9	NLEX Road Warriors	6	6	.500	3	
10	San Miguel Beermen	5	7	.417	4	
11	Blackwater Bossing	3	9	.250 (Note: Head-to-head record: Blackwater 1–0 Phoenix)	6	
12	Phoenix Fuel Masters	3	9	.250	6	
13	Terrafirma Dyip	1	11	.083	8	

Source: PBA.ph
Rules for classification: 1) winning percentage; 2) if two teams are tied, head-to-head record; if three or more teams are tied, head-to-head goal average (quotient); if tied for 8th, one-game playoff; 3) overall quotient; 4) coin toss
(G) Guests

=== Playoffs ===
Quarterfinals
(#1 twice-to-beat)
1	NorthPort	113
8	Magnolia	110
(Best-of-3)
4	Barangay Ginebra	2
5	Meralco	1
(#2 twice-to-beat)
2	TNT	109
7	Eastern	93
(Best-of-3)
3	Converge	1
6	Rain or Shine	2

Semifinals (Best-of-7)
1	NorthPort	1
4	Barangay Ginebra	4
2	TNT	4
6	Rain or Shine	1

Finals (Best-of-7)
4	Barangay Ginebra	3
2	TNT	4

==== Quarterfinals ====
Team 1	Series	Team 2	Game 1	Game 2
(1) NorthPort Batang Pier*	1–0	(8) Magnolia Chicken Timplados Hotshots	113–110	—
(2) TNT Tropang Giga*	1–0	(7) Eastern	109–93	—

Team 1	Series	Team 2	Game 1	Game 2	Game 3
(3) Converge FiberXers	1–2	(6) Rain or Shine Elasto Painters	130–118	104–114	103–112
(4) Barangay Ginebra San Miguel	2–1	(5) Meralco Bolts	100–92	104–108	94–87

*Team has twice-to-beat advantage. Team 1 only has to win once, while Team 2 has to win twice.

==== Semifinals ====
Team 1	Series	Team 2	Game 1	Game 2	Game 3	Game 4	Game 5	Game 6	Game 7
(1) NorthPort Batang Pier	1–4	(4) Barangay Ginebra San Miguel	93–115	106–119	100–127	108–103	99–126	—	—
(2) TNT Tropang Giga	4–1	(6) Rain or Shine Elasto Painters	88–84	93–91	98–103	93–85	97–92	—	—

==== Finals ====
Team 1	Series	Team 2	Game 1	Game 2	Game 3	Game 4	Game 5	Game 6	Game 7
(2) TNT Tropang Giga	4–3	(4) Barangay Ginebra San Miguel	95–89	70–71	87–85	78–95	66–73	87–83	87–83 (OT)

- Finals MVP: Rey Nambatac (TNT Tropang Giga)
- Best Player of the Conference: Arvin Tolentino (NorthPort Batang Pier)
- Bobby Parks Best Import of the Conference: Rondae Hollis-Jefferson (TNT Tropang Giga)

== 2025 PBA Philippine Cup ==
The 2025 PBA Philippine Cup started on April 4 and ended on July 25, 2025.

=== Elimination round ===
Pos	Team	W	L	PCT	GB	Qualification
1	San Miguel Beermen	8	3	.727 (Note: Head-to-head quotient: San Miguel 1.06, NLEX 1.01, Magnolia 0.97, Barangay Ginebra 0.96)	—	Twice-to-beat in the quarterfinals
2	NLEX Road Warriors	8	3	.727	—	Twice-to-beat in the quarterfinals
3	Magnolia Chicken Timplados Hotshots	8	3	.727	—	Twice-to-beat in the quarterfinals
4	Barangay Ginebra San Miguel	8	3	.727	—	Twice-to-beat in the quarterfinals
5	Converge FiberXers	7	4	.636	1	Twice-to-win in the quarterfinals
6	TNT Tropang 5G	6	5	.545 (Note: Head-to-head quotient: TNT 1.13, Rain or Shine 1.02, Meralco 0.87)	2	Twice-to-win in the quarterfinals
7	Rain or Shine Elasto Painters	6	5	.545	2	Twice-to-win in the quarterfinals
8	Meralco Bolts	6	5	.545	2	Twice-to-win in the quarterfinals
9	Phoenix Fuel Masters	4	7	.364	4	
10	Blackwater Bossing	2	9	.182 (Note: Head-to-head record: Blackwater 1–0 NorthPort)	6	
11	NorthPort Batang Pier	2	9	.182	6	
12	Terrafirma Dyip	1	10	.091	7	

Source: PBA.ph
Rules for classification: 1) winning percentage; 2) if two teams are tied, head-to-head record; if three or more teams are tied, head-to-head goal average (quotient); if tied for 8th, one-game playoff; 3) overall quotient; 4) coin toss

=== Playoffs ===
Quarterfinals (Top 4 twice-to-beat)
1	San Miguel	108
8	Meralco	97
4	Barangay Ginebra	88
5	Converge	80
2	NLEX	89	92
7	Rain or Shine	92	103
3	Magnolia	88	79
6	TNT	89	80

Semifinals (Best-of-7)
1	San Miguel	4
4	Barangay Ginebra	3
7	Rain or Shine	2
6	TNT	4

Finals (Best-of-7)
1	San Miguel	4
6	TNT	2

==== Quarterfinals ====
Team 1	Series	Team 2	Game 1	Game 2
(1) San Miguel Beermen*	1–0	(8) Meralco Bolts	108–97	—
(2) NLEX Road Warriors*	0–2	(7) Rain or Shine Elasto Painters	89–92	92–103
(3) Magnolia Chicken Timplados Hotshots*	0–2	(6) TNT Tropang 5G	88–89	79–80
(4) Barangay Ginebra San Miguel*	1–0	(5) Converge FiberXers	88–80	—

*Team has twice-to-beat advantage. Team 1 only has to win once, while Team 2 has to win twice.

==== Semifinals ====
Team 1	Series	Team 2	Game 1	Game 2	Game 3	Game 4	Game 5	Game 6	Game 7
(1) San Miguel Beermen	4–3	(4) Barangay Ginebra San Miguel	71–73	100–83	90–100	107–82	103–92	87–88	100–93
(6) TNT Tropang 5G	4–2	(7) Rain or Shine Elasto Painters	98–91	113–105 (OT)	86–107	108–92	97–113	97–89	—

==== Finals ====
Team 1	Series	Team 2	Game 1	Game 2	Game 3	Game 4	Game 5	Game 6	Game 7
(1) San Miguel Beermen	4–2	(6) TNT Tropang 5G	96–99	98–92	108–88	105–91	78–86	107–96	—

- Finals MVP: Jericho Cruz (San Miguel Beermen)
- Best Player of the Conference: June Mar Fajardo (San Miguel Beermen)

== Awards ==
=== Leo Awards ===
- Most Valuable Player: June Mar Fajardo (San Miguel)
- Rookie of the Year: RJ Abarrientos (Barangay Ginebra)
- Most Improved Player: Joshua Munzon (NorthPort)
- First Mythical Team:
  - CJ Perez (San Miguel)
  - Robert Bolick (NLEX)
  - June Mar Fajardo (San Miguel)
  - Arvin Tolentino (NorthPort)
  - Calvin Oftana (TNT)
- Second Mythical Team:
  - Scottie Thompson (Barangay Ginebra)
  - Roger Pogoy (TNT)
  - Justin Arana (Converge)
  - Japeth Aguilar (Barangay Ginebra)
  - Zavier Lucero (Magnolia)
- All-Defensive Team:
  - Glenn Khobuntin (TNT)
  - June Mar Fajardo (San Miguel)
  - Zavier Lucero (Magnolia)
  - Stephen Holt (Barangay Ginebra)
  - Joshua Munzon (NorthPort)
- Samboy Lim Sportsmanship Award: Gian Mamuyac (Rain or Shine)

=== PBA Press Corps Annual Awards ===
- Defensive Player of the Year: Zavier Lucero (Magnolia)
- Scoring Champion: Arvin Tolentino (NorthPort)
- Baby Dalupan Coach of the Year: Chot Reyes (TNT)
- Bogs Adornado Comeback Player of the Year: Brandon Ganuelas-Rosser (TNT)
- Mr. Quality Minutes: Don Trollano (San Miguel)
- Danny Floro Executive of the Year: Manny Pangilinan (TNT)
- Order of Merit: Calvin Oftana (TNT)
- All-Rookie Team:
  - RJ Abarrientos (Barangay Ginebra)
  - Kai Ballungay (Phoenix)
  - Justine Baltazar (Converge)
  - Sedrick Barefield (Blackwater)
  - Jordan Heading (TNT)
  - Caelan Tiongson (Rain or Shine)
- Game of the Season: TNT vs. Barangay Ginebra (2024–25 PBA Commissioner's Cup Finals - Game 7)

== Cumulative standings ==
Pos	Team	Pld	W	L	PCT	Best finish
1	TNT Tropang 5G	75	50	25	.667	Champions
2	Barangay Ginebra San Miguel	71	44	27	.620	Finalist
3	Converge FiberXers	42	24	18	.571	Quarterfinalist
4	San Miguel Beermen	58	33	25	.569	Champions
5	Eastern	13	7	6	.538	Quarterfinalist
6	Rain or Shine Elasto Painters	59	31	28	.525	Semifinalist
7	Meralco Bolts	40	21	19	.525	Quarterfinalist
8	Magnolia Chicken Timplados Hotshots	42	22	20	.524	Quarterfinalist
9	NLEX Road Warriors	40	20	20	.500	Quarterfinalist
10	NorthPort Batang Pier	39	16	23	.410	Semifinalist
11	Blackwater Bossing	33	10	23	.303	Elimination round
12	Phoenix Fuel Masters	33	8	25	.242	Elimination round
13	Terrafirma Dyip	33	3	30	.091	Elimination round

=== Elimination round ===
Pos	Team	Pld	W	L	PCT
1	Barangay Ginebra San Miguel	33	22	11	.667 (Note: Head-to-head elimination round quotient: Barangay Ginebra +14, TNT -14)
2	TNT Tropang 5G	33	22	11	.667
3	Converge FiberXers	33	21	12	.636
4	Rain or Shine Elasto Painters	33	20	13	.606 (Note: Head-to-head elimination round quotient: Rain or Shine +2, Meralco -2)
5	Meralco Bolts	33	20	13	.606
6	Eastern (G)	12	7	5	.583
7	San Miguel Beermen	33	19	14	.576 (Note: Head-to-head elimination round quotient: San Miguel +15, NLEX -6, Magnolia -8)
8	NLEX Road Warriors	33	19	14	.576
9	Magnolia Chicken Timplados Hotshots	33	19	14	.576
10	NorthPort Batang Pier	33	14	19	.424
11	Blackwater Bossing	33	10	23	.303
12	Phoenix Fuel Masters	33	8	25	.242
13	Terrafirma Dyip	33	3	30	.091

(G) Guests

=== Playoffs ===
This includes one-game playoffs to determine the last playoff participant.

Pos	Team	Pld	W	L
1	TNT Tropang 5G	42	28	14
2	Barangay Ginebra San Miguel	38	22	16
3	San Miguel Beermen	25	14	11
4	Rain or Shine Elasto Painters	26	11	15
5	Converge FiberXers	9	3	6
6	Magnolia Chicken Timplados Hotshots	9	3	6
7	NorthPort Batang Pier	6	2	4
8	Meralco Bolts	7	1	6
9	NLEX Road Warriors	7	1	6
10	Eastern (G)	1	0	1
11	Blackwater Bossing	0	0	0
12	Phoenix Fuel Masters	0	0	0
13	Terrafirma Dyip	0	0	0

(G) Guests

== PBA teams in Asian club competitions ==
Team	Competition	Progress	Ref.
Meralco Bolts	2024–25 East Asia Super League	Group stage	
San Miguel Beermen	2024–25 East Asia Super League	Group stage	
Meralco Bolts	2025 Basketball Champions League Asia	Quarterfinals	
