= Quota players =

Quota players, also known as imports, are athletes in team sports whose numbers in a specific team are limited due to the rules of specific competitions said team plays in. At present, most of these restrictions are used to aid financial equality between teams or encourage the use of local players.

Such quotas can limit the number of players from outside a team's country, or limit the salary a players is on. Oppositely, quotas can also dictate teams have a minimum number of a specific type of player. Racial quotas have also been used in the past with the aim of combating racism.

== Notable examples ==
=== Association football ===
- In English football, the Homegrown Player Rule states that all Premier League team 25-man squads must have eight players who have played in either the English or Welsh youth system for at least three years before age 21.
- UEFA's Homegrown Player Rule also requires eight players of a 25-man squad to be trained in a domestic youth system. Further, four of the eight must have played for the club's own youth system.
- In Major League Soccer, the Designated Player Rule allowed players in the league to be paid higher than the league's salary cap, while also limiting the number of these players to three per team. The rule was introduced in order to encourage more high profile players to join the league and aid the growth of the competition. The rule, also called the "Beckham Rule", is named after David Beckham, who was the first player to be signed under this rule in 2007.

=== Basketball ===
- The Philippine Basketball Association imposes quotas for the number of players on each team born outside the country. For its background, the PBA divides its season into "conferences"—not groupings of teams, usually by geography, as in North American sports, but separate competitions within the season.
  - In the most prestigious conference, the Philippine Cup, only Filipino-born players and natural-born Filipinos or Filipino-descended foreigners born outside the country can play. Naturalized Filipinos and other foreigners, known by the PBA as "imports", are banned.
  - In the other two conferences, the Commissioner's Cup and Governor's Cup, each team can field one import, with a height restriction—no taller than 6'5"/1.96 m in the Governor's Cup only, as of 2026. Also of note is that in the Governor's Cup, each team is allowed only one game in which it does not field an import. (In that competition, "imports" can be replaced from game to game.)
  - In all conferences, each team is restricted to seven "Filipino-foreigners", defined as people of Filipino descent born outside the country.

=== Rugby league ===
- The Rugby Football League's overseas quota limits the number of non-federation trained players to ten, increasing from seven in 2026. In practice, a federation trained player must have played in Europe for three years before age 21. The rule applies to the top tier British rugby (i.e., the Super League) and was introduced in 2019 with a cap of five players. A previous incarnation of this rule existed in the 2000s which saw a maximum of three non European players.
  - Exemptions:
    - The "New Player Rule" exempts players from a club's quota if they are signed from a different sport.
    - In 2019, Widnes Vikings went into administration resulting in a number of players' contracts being terminated. The club's three overseas players were made exempt from other club's quotas in order to such clubs to sign them.
    - Toronto Wolfpack:
      - During the club's time in British rugby, Canadian, American, and Jamaican players were exempt from the club's quota.
      - Following the club's exit from British rugby, all players were made exempt from other club's quotas for the duration of their contract in order to facilitate these players continuing to play in the league.
- In 2026, an overseas quota was introduced into the second tier (i.e., the RFL Championship) limiting the number of non-federation players to five from 2028 with an intermediary cap of seven for 2027.

=== South African sport ===
- Following the end of Apartheid in South Africa, sport was still largely played by white South Africans with non-white players largely ignored. In an effort to combat these issues racial quotas were set up for many of the major sports in the country, including cricket and rugby union. However, the players selected for their teams often received just as much — if not more — abuse from fans and even their own teammates, especially if the team lost a match. South African rugby union is split on quotas; teams in the lower leagues are required to play a minimum number of non-white players, while the top domestic teams and the national team are not.

== Advantages and disadvantages ==
=== Foreign player quotas ===
The presence of foreign players is often argued to be of detriment to domestic players' development, and consequentially the national team. A counterpoint view, is that foreign players give opportunity to local players to be able to compete against international players outside of national team matches.

In the Chinese Super League, where high-profile foreign players often fetch higher transfer fees and salary, state-run media Xinhua criticized clubs that employ foreign reinforcements as "burning money".

== Legality ==
In 1995, the European Court of Justice announced the Bosman ruling following the conclusion of three legal cases involving footballer Jean-Marc Bosman. The ruling determined it was illegal for European Union (EU) member states to class foreign EU players as foreign in any foreign player quotas. Recording foreign EU players as foreign with in the EU was determined to violate the Freedom of movement for workers in the European Union.
