= Patrick Partosa =

Filipino basketball coach

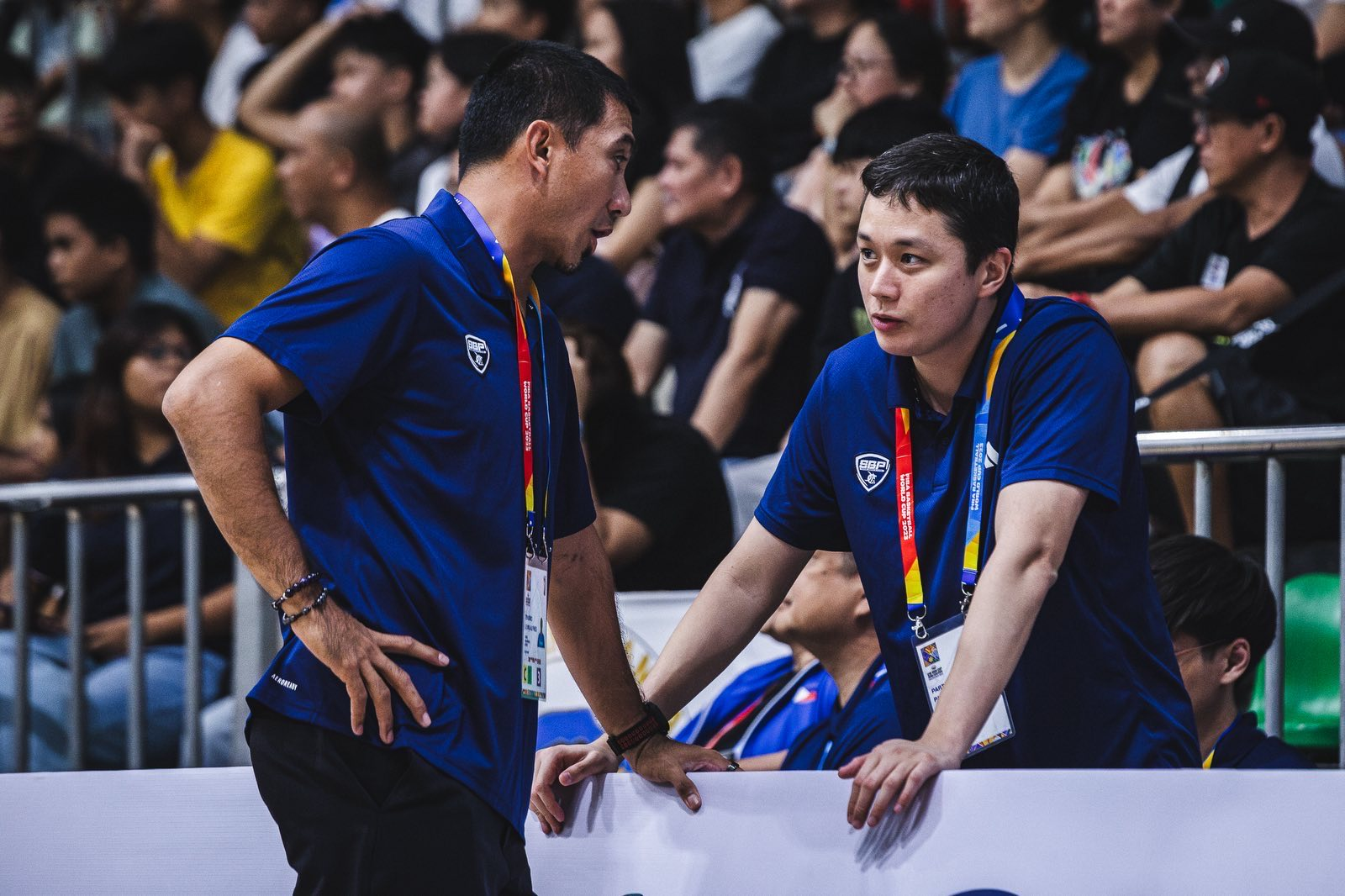

Barangay Ginebra San Miguel
- Position: Assistant coach
- League: PBA

Career history

Coaching
- 2021–present: Barangay Ginebra San Miguel (assistant)
- 2023–present: Philippines (assistant)
- 2025–present: Philippines U-17 (assistant)

Career highlights
- As assistant coach: 2× PBA champion (2022–23 Commissioner's, 2026 Commissioner's)
Medals
Men's basketball
Assistant coach for Philippines
Southeast Asian Games
Gold medal – first place	2023 Phnom Penh	Team
Asian Games
Gold medal – first place	2022 Hangzhou	Team

Patrick Matthew Partosa is a Filipino basketball coach who serves as an assistant coach for the Barangay Ginebra San Miguel in the PBA and the Philippines men's national basketball team.

== Career ==
Partosa joined Barangay Ginebra in 2017, serving as team video coordinator and analytics. In 2021 he became an assistant coach, to replace Freddie Abuda who migrated to the United States.

At the 2024 PBA All-Stars, he became the head coach of Team Greats, one of the two teams of the Rookie, Sophomore and Juniors Game which is composed of 24 top young players chosen by the fans.

He became an assistant coach for the Philippine national basketball team in 2023 first under coach Chot Reyes for the 2023 FIBA World Cup qualifiers, the SEA Games and the 2023 FIBA Basketball World Cup. Then under Ginebra head coach Tim Cone starting with the Gold Medal winning team at the Asian Games and continuing to serve with Jong Uichico, Josh Reyes, and Sean Chambers.
