= Calvin Oftana =

Filipino basketball player (born 1996)

No. 8 – TNT Tropang 5G
- Position: Small forward
- League: PBA

Personal information
- Born: January 3, 1996 (age 30) Danao, Cebu, Philippines
- Listed height: 6 ft 5 in (1.96 m)
- Listed weight: 186 lb (84 kg)

Career information
- High school: Asian College - Dumaguete
- College: San Beda
- PBA draft: 2020: 1st round3rd overall (Note: The 2021 draft was composed of two drafts: the Gilas special round, which consists of 4 players reserved for the Gilas Pilipinas program, and the regular draft. Oftana was selected as the third pick of the regular draft.)
- Drafted by: NLEX Road Warriors
- Playing career: 2021–present

Career history
- 2021–2022: NLEX Road Warriors
- 2022–present: TNT Tropang Giga/5G

Career highlights
- 3× PBA champion (2023 Governors', 2024 Governors', 2024–25 Commissioner's); 3× PBA All-Star (2023, 2024, 2026); PBA 3-Point Shootout–Guards edition champion (2024); PBA First Mythical Team (2025); 2× PBA Second Mythical Team (2023, 2024); PBA All-Rookie Team (2021); PBA Order of Merit (2025); 3× NCAA Philippines champion (2016–2018); NCAA Philippines MVP (2019); NCAA Philippines Mythical Team (2019); Filoil Flying V Preseason Cup champion (2019); Filoil Flying V Preseason Cup Mythical Five (2019)
Medals
Men's basketball
Representing Philippines
Asian Games
Gold medal – first place	2022 Hangzhou	Team
SEA Games
Gold medal – first place	2023 Phnom Penh	Team

Calvin John Oftana (born January 3, 1996) is a Filipino professional basketball player for the TNT Tropang 5G of the Philippine Basketball Association (PBA). He played college basketball for the San Beda Red Lions in the NCAA. He plays the small forward position. He has also played as a shooting guard during college. A three-time PBA champion, he is also a member of the Philippine men's national basketball team.

== Early life ==
Oftana was born in Danao, Cebu, but grew up in Siaton after his parents split up. He was raised by his mother along with his nine siblings. He did track and field, winning a 100-meter sprint in a district meet when he was Grade 6. He was also a volleyball spiker. When he got a growth spurt in high school, he was encouraged to try basketball. He played it in fiesta opens.

== High school career ==
When Oftana was in second year high school, he was discovered by Coach Mike Villahermosa of Asian College-Dumaguete. He convinced Oftana's mother to let Calvin play basketball for him. Under Coach Villahermosa, Oftana learned the basics of basketball. He also watched YouTube videos of shooting and dribbling drills to hone his skills further.

== College career ==
Oftana first played for the San Beda Red Lions in Season 92. He won titles with San Beda from 2016 to 2018. He was a backup to Art Dela Cruz and Javee Mocon during this time, as he developed his work ethic.

In Season 95, Oftana took on a bigger role. He had a near triple-double with ten points, ten rebounds, and seven assists in a win against the San Sebastian Stags. For that performance, he was given Player of the Week honors. He had a college career-best of 27 points and nine rebounds against the CSB Blazers. He won Player of the Week again after scoring a personal-best 29 points while adding nine rebounds, five assists, and two steals in San Beda's rematch over the Blazers. He won MVP after averaging 15.6 points, 8.2 rebounds, 2.7 assists, and 1.2 blocks, becoming the eighth MVP to hail from San Beda (the first since Sudan Daniel in 2010), and finishing 18–0 in the eliminations as they gained an outright finals berth. They lost to the Letran Knights in three games.

== Professional career ==
=== NLEX Road Warriors (2021–2022) ===
In 2021, Oftana declared for the PBA season 46 draft. He was offered to be included in the special Gilas round during the draft, but he declined. He was drafted with the third pick during the first round by the NLEX Road Warriors. In their elimination round match against the Meralco Bolts, he had a then career-high 34 points on 8-of-11 shooting on three-pointers and 12-of-18 from the field in 29 minutes of play; breaking the all-time record in three point attempts made by a rookie at eighth, erasing the 34-year mark of Allan Caidic at seven. He scored the game-winning layup with 6.1 seconds left as NLEX got an 81–80 win in the quarterfinals. On February 11, 2022, during a 100–110 loss against the Meralco Bolts, Oftana exited the game in the fourth quarter after suffering an injury. It was later revealed to be a fractured left ring finger, and was subsequently ruled out for six weeks. Despite not being able to finish the season, he still made it to the PBA All-Rookie team.

In Oftana's first game since the injury (which was also NLEX's season-opener for the 2022–23 season), he scored 18 of his 20 points in the fourth quarter to help his team outscore the Terrafirma Dyip and complete their comeback win. Against the Phoenix Super LPG Fuel Masters, he made a three-pointer that sent the game into overtime. The Road Warriors won in overtime, and he finished with 22 points, 10 rebounds, seven assists, two steals, and two blocks. He then had 18 points against the NorthPort Batang Pier as NLEX claimed the 6th seed. In Game 3 of their Philippine Cup playoff series against the Magnolia Hotshots, he had 32 points, 9 rebounds, 3 assists, and 3 steals, but he wasn't able to score in overtime and Magnolia went on to eliminate them.

=== TNT Tropang Giga / TNT Tropang 5G (2022–present) ===
==== 2022–23 season: First PBA championship ====
On September 19, 2022, Oftana was traded to the TNT Tropang Giga in a three-team trade involving TNT, NLEX, and the Blackwater Bossing. Prior to playing a game with the team, he signed a three-year contract extension on October 4. In his first game with TNT during the Commissioner's Cup, he had 12 points and seven rebounds, but committed two costly turnovers in the fourth quarter and was whistled for fouling Paul Lee with 4.3 seconds left. Lee then went on to make two game-winning free throws for the Magnolia. Against his former coach Yeng Guiao, now with the Rain or Shine Elasto Painters, he contributed 15 points, eight rebounds, and four assists in the win. In a loss to Phoenix, he had his best game yet, with 27 points on seven three pointers in 38 minutes. TNT did not qualify for the playoffs that conference, their first since the 2018 Governors' Cup.

In Oftana's first game of the 2023 Governors' Cup, he had 17 points and seven rebounds in a win over Phoenix. After missing a game due to health protocols, he had a double-double of 14 points and 10 rebounds to help TNT take the win over Magnolia. Against the San Miguel Beermen, he had 14 points, six assists, and 10 rebounds, with the last rebound allowing him to make the game-winning putback basket. This allowed him to receive Player of the Week honors and placed TNT at the top of the standings for the conference. He also made it into the PBA All-Star Game as a replacement for Terrence Romeo. In the semifinals, he had 21 first half points in Game 4 against Meralco to send TNT back to the finals. In his finals debut, he had 16 points on 7-of-11 shooting, but still lost to Barangay Ginebra. He then had a double-double of 14 points and 13 rebounds as TNT tied the series in Game 2. In Game 5, he stepped up for injured RR Pogoy with 20 points on four triples as TNT took a 3–2 series lead. He was able to win his first PBA championship in the following game. For the 2022–23 season, he was named to the Second Mythical Team.

==== 2023–24 season ====
In TNT's first game of the 2023–24 season, Oftana scored 28 points as he tried to rally the team against Magnolia, but they lost. Against NLEX, he scored 19 of his 29 points in the third quarter to lead TNT back from 22 points down and eventually take the win. In a loss to San Miguel, he had a double-double of 27 points and 13 rebounds. In a Christmas Day game against Ginebra, he had 27 points and three steals, but was only able to score six points in the fourth quarter, and they lost. He then reset his career-high to 37 points alongside Rahlir Hollis-Jefferson's 50 points, but they still lost to Rain or Shine. They got to the Commissioner's Cup playoffs as the eighth seed, but they lost in the quarterfinals to Magnolia. He finished fourth in the voting for Best Player of the Conference for the Commissioner's Cup, and almost made the 50–40–90 club with percentages of 49% from the field, 41% from three, and 90% from the free throw line during that conference.

Oftana started the 2024 Philippine Cup by scoring TNT's last five points in a clutch win over Rain or Shine. He finished that game with 23 points, 14 rebounds, and three assists. That season, he played in the All-Star Game and won the 3-Point Shootout for the guards. In a win against Meralco, he scored 26 points, including seven points in the clutch. He tied his season-high of 37 points in a comeback win over NLEX in which he made eight triples. In Game 1 of the quarterfinals against Rain or Shine, he scored 32 points, with 18 coming in the third quarter, to lead all scorers and get the win. Rain or Shine then limited him to just 11 points on 3-of-14 shooting from the field as they took the following game. In Game 3, he had 27 points, but committed two turnovers in the final minutes of the game as their season ended at the hands of Rain or Shine. For the 2023–24 season, he made the Second Mythical Team once again.

==== 2024–25 season: Chasing the Grand Slam ====
Off his stint with the Philippine national team, Oftana was motivated to be a better player and leader for TNT. He started the 2024 Governors' Cup with 15 points, seven rebounds, and two assists in a win over NorthPort. He also made two four-pointers, becoming the first PBA player to make at least two in a game. In a win over Meralco, he had 25 points, seven rebounds, and three assists. In a rematch against NorthPort, he got hit in his lower lip, which required 30 stitches. Two games later, he had 18 points in a quarterfinals win over NLEX. They beat NLEX in the quarterfinals 3–1. In a Game 2 win of their semis against Rain or Shine, he had 18 points and 14 rebounds. TNT won that series 4–1, leading them to face Ginebra in the finals. In Game 4, he had 20 points in the first half, but Ginebra held him to just six points in the second half, which allowed Ginebra to win and tie the series 2–2. Although he scored less in Game 5, he was more efficient and more impactful on defense, which keyed TNT into the win. TNT was able to close out the series in Game 6, giving him his second PBA championship. During the finals, he averaged 14.4 points, 7.4 rebounds and 1.2 assists. With the title, TNT was in position to compete for a grand slam.

TNT started the 2024–25 Commissioner's Cup with two straight losses. On December 11, 2024, Oftana scored a career-high 42 points in a win over Magnolia, their first of the conference. Combined with Rondae Hollis-Jefferson's 41 points, they became the first PBA local and import duo to both score 40 or more points in 33 years. For his performance, he was awarded Player of the Week. He followed it up with 18 points and eight rebounds in a win over Blackwater. Starting with their win over Magnolia, TNT won six straight.

Oftana then missed several of TNT's following games due to his duties with the national team, but came back in time for their semifinals matchup with Rain or Shine. During the semis, their leader Jayson Castro went down due to a patellar tendon tear, and he struggled with his shooting. In Game 4 of the semis, he stepped up with 26 points to go up 3–1 in the series. For stepping up in Castro's absence, he was recognized as the Player of the Week. TNT was able to close out the series and reach the finals, where they faced Ginebra once again. Before the finals, he was averaging 18.1 points, 5.8 rebounds and 1.9 assists in 18 games, putting him in contention for Best Player of the Conference. He ended up second, losing to Arvin Tolentino. However, throughout the series, he struggled with his shooting, especially in the clutch, and TNT went down 3–2. TNT rallied to force a Game 7, and in Game 7, he made a game-sealing lay-up with 6.3 seconds left to win his third PBA championship and keep their hopes for a grand slam alive.

Now without Castro and Hollis-Jefferson for the 2025 Philippine Cup, TNT started the conference with three straight losses, their worst start since the 2000 All-Filipino Cup. Against the Beermen, Oftana stepped up with a career-high 21 rebounds along with 23 points and six assists to lead TNT to its first win of the conference. He then followed it up with 22 points, four rebounds, and three blocks in a win over Terrafirma. These performances earned him his third Best Player of the Week award for the season. TNT then won its next four straight games for a total of six straight wins. With a loss to Magnolia, they finished the elimination round with a 6–5 record. During that loss, he sprained his ankle. Still, he played through the pain during the quarterfinals. Once again, they faced Rain or Shine in the semis. In Game 2, Pogoy injured his hamstring before the second half and missed the rest of the game. He then stepped up with 39 points to lead them to an overtime win. However, he could have won the game for them in regulation, as he was fouled beyond the four-point line, but given only three free throws to send the game into overtime. The PBA admitted that he should have been given four free throws. The league then awarded him his fourth Player of the Week award of the season. However, in Game 4, he sprained his ankle again. TNT was able to close out the series in six games to make the finals, this time against San Miguel. With him and Pogoy playing through injuries, they took the series to six games, but the Beermen won the Philippine Cup title.

== National team career ==
In 2020, Oftana was called up to the Philippine national team to play against Thailand. In that contest, he scored 9 points on 3-of-5 shooting along with 4 rebounds and 4 assists.

In 2022, Oftana made his return to the national team for the fourth window of qualifying for the 2023 World Cup. He played against Lebanon and Saudi Arabia. He also got to play in the fifth and sixth windows.

Oftana then made his SEA Games debut in the 2023 edition. However, he suffered a Grade Two strain in his calf in Gilas' first game against Malaysia and was later ruled to be out for the rest of the tournament.

Oftana was included in the 21-man pool for the 2023 FIBA World Cup. However, he was not included in the 12-man final roster. He did get to play in the 2022 Asian Games. In a win over Qatar, he scored 11 points, including three triples in the first quarter. The team then went on to win its first Asian Games gold medal in basketball in 61 years.

In 2024, Oftana was picked by coach Tim Cone to play for the Philippine team for the next four years. That year, he played in the February and November windows of the 2025 FIBA Asia Cup qualifiers and in the 2024 FIBA OQT. In 2025, he played in the February window of the Asia Cup qualifiers. Despite an ankle injury, he was able to join the team for the 2025 FIBA Asia Cup.

In 2026, Oftana played in the second February window of the Asia Cup qualifiers. Several injuries kept him out of the next two windows. He was then called up as a replacement for Justin Brownlee for the 2026 Asian Games. This made him the only returning member from the Philippine team that won the previous edition. In a loss to Bahrain, he scored 31 points. The team were not able to defend its title, finishing in ninth place.

== PBA career statistics ==
Legend
GP	Games played	MPG	Minutes per game	FG%	Field-goal percentage
3FG%	3-point field-goal percentage	4P%	4-point field-goal percentage	FT%	Free-throw percentage
RPG	Rebounds per game	APG	Assists per game	SPG	Steals per game
BPG	Blocks per game	PPG	Points per game	127	Career high

As of the end of 2024–25 season

=== Season-by-season averages ===
Year	Team	GP	MPG	FG%	3P%	4P%	FT%	RPG	APG	SPG	BPG	PPG
2021	NLEX	19	22.9	.456	.319	—	.744	5.9	1.7	.6	.6	10.4
2022–23	NLEX	46	29.7	.465	.383	—	.811	7.0	2.1	1.2	.5	13.6
2022–23	TNT	46	29.7	.465	.383	—	.811	7.0	2.1	1.2	.5	13.6
2023–24	TNT	26	36.9	.481	.399	—	.830	8.0	2.6	.9	.5	21.8
2024–25	TNT	74	34.8	.439	.388	.214	.807	6.9	2.3	.8	.3	16.1
Career		165	32.3	.455	.384	.214	.808	7.0	2.2	.9	.4	15.6

== Personal life ==
In 2023, Oftana celebrated the birth of his first son Khalel Thaddeus.
