= Scottie Thompson (basketball) =

Filipino basketball player (born 1993)

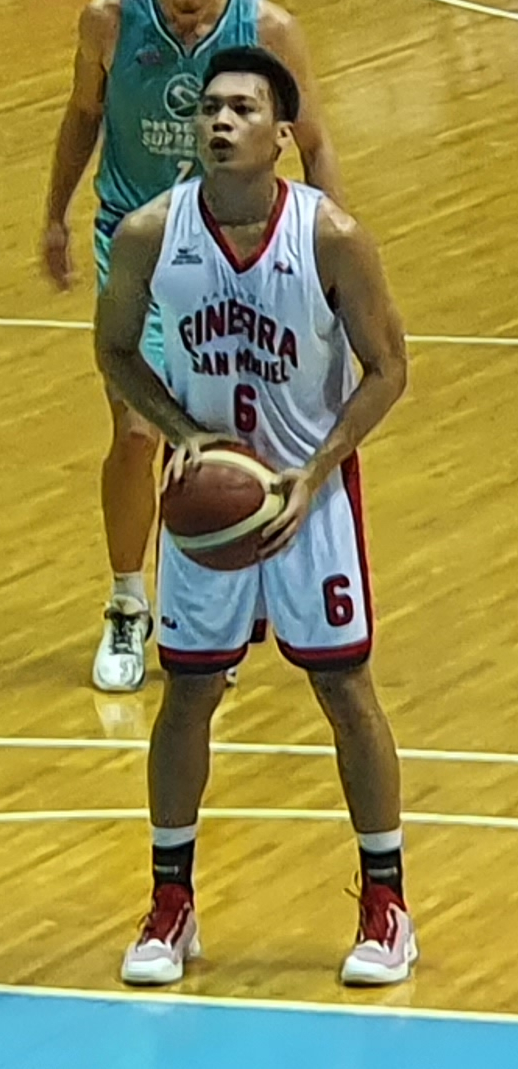
- Thompson with the Barangay Ginebra San Miguel in 2021

No. 9 – Barangay Ginebra San Miguel
- Position: Shooting guard / point guard
- League: PBA

Personal information
- Born: July 12, 1993 (age 33) Padada, Davao del Sur, Philippines
- Listed height: 6 ft 1 in (1.85 m)
- Listed weight: 180 lb (82 kg)

Career information
- High school: Cor Jesu (Digos, Davao del Sur); Agro-Industrial Foundation (Davao City)
- College: Perpetual (2011–2015)
- PBA draft: 2015: 1st round, 5th overall pick
- Drafted by: Barangay Ginebra San Miguel
- Playing career: 2015–present
- Number: 6, 9

Career history
- 2015–present: Barangay Ginebra San Miguel

Career highlights
- 8× PBA champion (2016 Governors', 2017 Governors', 2018 Commissioner's, 2019 Governors', 2020 Philippine, 2021 Governors', 2022–23 Commissioner's, 2026 Commissioner's); 3× PBA Finals MVP (2018 Commissioner's, 2021 Governors', 2026 Commissioner's); PBA Most Valuable Player (2021); 2× PBA Best Player of the Conference (2021 Governors', 2022–23 Commissioner's); 7× PBA All-Star (2016–2019, 2023, 2024, 2026); PBA Sportsmanship Award (2020); 2× PBA Mythical First Team (2021, 2023); 2× PBA Mythical Second Team (2018, 2025); PBA All-Rookie Team (2016); PBA Most Improved Player (2018); 50 Greatest Players in PBA History (2025 selection); PBA D-League champion (2015 Aspirant's); NCAA Philippines Most Valuable Player (2014); NCAA Philippines Most Improved Player (2012); 3× NCAA Philippines Mythical Team (2012, 2014, 2015); No. 6 jersey retired by Perpetual Altas; PSA Awardee for Professional Basketball (2022)
Medals
Men's basketball
Representing Philippines
Asian Games
Gold medal – first place	2022 Hangzhou	Team
SEABA Championship
Gold medal – first place	2015 Singapore	Team
SEA Games
Gold medal – first place	2015 Singapore	Team

Earl Scottie Carreon Thompson (born July 12, 1993) is a Filipino professional basketball player for the Barangay Ginebra San Miguel of the Philippine Basketball Association (PBA). He is also the team manager for the Perpetual Altas of the Philippines' NCAA.

== Early life ==
Thompson was born on July 12, 1993, and was named after Scottie Pippen as his father is a big Chicago Bulls fan. Thompson has American roots through his paternal great-grandfather.

Thompson started playing basketball when he was in elementary, but his game took off during his senior year in high school when he played in the Palarong Pambansa (representing Region XI) and was chosen for the Nike Elite Camp. According to him, he had no scholarship offers from top collegiate schools except for Perpetual Help.

== College career ==
Thompson played college basketball at the University of Perpetual Help System DALTA Altas of the NCAA. In his rookie season, he was the Altas' sixth man, averaging 6.6 points, 4.2 rebounds, and 1.9 assists in 18.3 minutes per game. During his MVP year in 2014, he posted an impressive stat line of 26.5 PPG and 10.0 RPG, while leading the Altas to the Final Four. He was also included in the Mythical 5 selection in that same season. Despite dishing off triple-double performances for the Altas, he ended his college career in 2015 after his school bowed out of the Final Four contention.

In 2023, Perpetual retired Thompson's jersey #6.

== Amateur career ==
Thompson suited up for the Hapee Fresh Fighters in the PBA D-League, where he teamed up with fellow college standouts and future draft batchmates Troy Rosario, Baser Amer, Garvo Lanete and Chris Newsome. Behind his heroics, he helped the Fresh Fighters win its first ever PBA D-League title in 2015.

== Professional career ==
=== Barangay Ginebra San Miguel (2015–present) ===
Thompson was drafted fifth overall in the 2015 PBA draft by the Barangay Ginebra San Miguel. In his first game as a pro, he scored 5 points, 3 rebounds, 6 assists, and 2 steals in 16 minutes of play in a 78–86 loss over the Star Hotshots. Despite the fact that he only practiced with the team for less than a week and with the limited minutes he's given, his stellar play earned him praises from coach Tim Cone. In his third career game back on November 7, 2015, Thompson recorded 8 points, 4 rebounds, 2 assists and 2 steals in just 14 minutes of playing time in a 93–92 win over the Alaska Aces. On December 5, 2015, Thompson almost recorded a triple-double after putting up 9 points, 9 rebounds and 6 assists in 102–94 win over the Blackwater Elite. In the semifinals of 2016 Governors' Cup, he registered a triple double performance long after Johnny Abarrientos era. He was awarded later the 2016 All-Rookie Team.

In 2018 Commissioner's Cup finals, he was awarded the Finals MVP. He eventually won the 2017–18 Mythical Second Team and Most Improved Player awards.

In 2021 Governors' Cup, Thompson won his first Best Player of the Conference award. In the 2021 Governors' Cup finals, he won his sixth PBA title and was judged as the Finals MVP for the second time of his career. On June 5, 2022, he was awarded the 2021 Mythical First Team and the 2021 Most Valuable Player.

On January 6, 2023, Thompson was awarded with his second Best Player of the Conference award, this time in the 2022–23 Commissioner's Cup. On November 5, 2023, he was included in the 2022–23 Mythical First Team for the second straight season.

On September 10, 2024, Thompson recorded his 9th triple-double of his career with 21 points, 10 rebounds and 11 assists in a 112–98 victory against Blackwater.

On April 2, 2025, Thompson was included in the 50 Greatest Players in PBA History.

On January 11, 2026, Thompson helped Barangay Ginebra tie the series against the San Miguel Beermen in a 105–91 victory in Game 4 of the semifinals of the 2025–26 Philippine Cup. He registered his 11th career triple-double with a career-high of 35 points, 11 rebounds and 11 assists. Thompson was the first local player in almost 33 years to score a 30-point triple double since Johnny Abarrientos of Alaska posted 30 points, 15 rebounds and 11 assists in a losing cause vs. Swift Mighty Meaty Hotdogs in the 1993 All-Filipino Cup, while on the winning effort, was the first in 35 years since Ronnie Magsanoc of the Shell Rimula X registered 32 points, 13 rebounds and 18 assists in a win vs. Pepsi Hotshots during the 1990 All-Filipino Conference.

On June 17, 2026, Thompson was named the Finals MVP of the 2026 Commissioner's Cup finals after helping Barangay Ginebra beat the TNT Tropang 5G in Game 7.

== National team career ==
Thompson was part of the 12-man Sinag Pilipinas lineup that competed in the 2015 Southeast Asian Games and 2015 SEABA Championship, both held in Singapore, where they won gold medals in both occasions.

Thompson was included in the 21-man pool for the 2023 FIBA World Cup, where he was eventually included in the final 12-man lineup.

== Player profile ==
Thompson is well known for his offensive mindset and defensive versatility. In college, he accumulated several triple-doubles on account of his all-around capabilities.

On offense, his scoring output is not that high, averaging just 10.3 points per game in his career because of his role on the team. However, he focuses on making his teammates better as a facilitator. With his play-making abilities and skills, he averages 5.2 assists per game in his career.

He is also highly regarded for his rebounding efforts. At a height of 6'1, he is a great rebounder for his position and size. Thompson credits his prowess to having good positioning. Others credit it to his high energy and hustle. He can outrebound a taller opponent due to his high vertical leap. During the Governor's Cup, he was 2nd in rebounds per game among locals with nearly 10 (behind only the 6'10 June Mar Fajardo). As of the end of the 2024–25 PBA season, he has managed 7.5 rebounds per game.

With that, he is often compared to Russell Westbrook of the NBA because of their similar playing style.

Thompson is considered a lockdown defender, especially on the perimeter. He is often asked to guard his opposition over a high volume of minutes. He excels at forcing turnovers against opponents.

== Career statistics ==
=== PBA ===
Legend
GP	Games played	MPG	Minutes per game	FG%	Field-goal percentage
3FG%	3-point field-goal percentage	4P%	4-point field-goal percentage	FT%	Free-throw percentage
RPG	Rebounds per game	APG	Assists per game	SPG	Steals per game
BPG	Blocks per game	PPG	Points per game	**127**	Career high

As of the end of 2024–25 season

==== Season-by-season averages ====
Year	Team	GP	MPG	FG%	3P%	4P%	FT%	RPG	APG	SPG	BPG	PPG
2015–16	Barangay Ginebra	49	21.5	.384	.264	—	.606	5.1	3.2	.5	.1	5.5
2016–17	Barangay Ginebra	64	30.5	.459	.271	—	.565	7.8	4.4	1.0	.2	8.5
2017–18	Barangay Ginebra	57	34.1	.445	.320	—	.687	**9.0**	5.6	1.4	.3	9.3
2019	Barangay Ginebra	52	31.9	.439	.311	—	.538	7.3	5.0	1.3	.4	8.3
2020	Barangay Ginebra	22	36.5	.439	.329	—	.689	8.8	5.8	1.1	.4	11.0
2021	Barangay Ginebra	33	**38.3**	.479	.363	—	**.700**	**9.0**	5.4	1.2	**.9**	**13.9**
2022–23	Barangay Ginebra	60	37.8	.490	.358	—	.681	7.7	6.0	**1.6**	.6	**13.9**
2023–24	Barangay Ginebra	25	37.0	.395	.314	—	.429	7.3	**6.2**	1.5	.8	10.3
2024–25	Barangay Ginebra	**71**	34.5	**.499**	**.372**	.158	.638	6.6	5.5	1.3	.4	12.7
Career		433	33.1	.459	.331	.158	.626	7.5	5.2	1.2	.4	10.3

=== National team ===
Legend
GP	Games played	MPG	Minutes per game
FG%	Field-goal percentage	3P%	3-point field-goal percentage	FT%	Free-throw percentage
RPG	Rebounds per game	APG	Assists per game	SPG	Steals per game
BPG	Blocks per game	PPG	Points per game	**Bold**	Career high

==== FIBA ====
Year	Team	GP	MPG	FG%	3P%	FT%	RPG	APG	SPG	BPG	PPG
2015 SEABA Championship	Philippines	5	16.4	.417	.231	.600	4.2	4.6	1.0	.2	**7.8**
2019 FIBA Basketball World Cup qualification	Philippines	5	11.4	.333	.143	.500	3.8	1.6	.6	.2	2.8
2023 FIBA Basketball World Cup qualification	Philippines	**6**	23.7	**.625**	**.500**	.545	**6.8**	4.8	1.0	.3	6.2
2023 FIBA Basketball World Cup	Philippines	5	12.5	.333	.200	—	2.0	2.2	—	—	1.8
2025 FIBA Asia Cup qualification	Philippines	**6**	**26.7**	.293	.333	**1.000**	3.8	**6.2**	**1.2**	**.7**	5.2
2025 FIBA Asia Cup	Philippines	5	24.6	.462	.167	**1.000**	6.0	4.2	.4	.2	5.4
Career		32	19.6	.408	.241	.615	4.5	4.1	.7	.3	4.9

==== Asian Games ====
Year	Team	GP	MPG	FG%	3P%	FT%	RPG	APG	SPG	BPG	PPG
2022	Philippines	7	28.8	.467	.313	.667	6.7	3.4	1.3	.3	8.7
Career		7	28.8	.467	.313	.667	6.7	3.4	1.3	.3	8.7

==== Southeast Asian Games ====
Year	Team	GP	MPG	FG%	3P%	FT%	RPG	APG	SPG	BPG	PPG
2015	Philippines	5	15.1	.333	.222	.667	4.0	2.0	.8	.2	4.0
Career		5	15.1	.333	.222	.667	4.0	2.0	.8	.2	4.0

== Personal life ==
Thompson founded his own barbershop, the Thompson's Sports Hair Shop which opened in Digos in October 2016. According to Thompson, he is of partial American descent as his great-grandfather is African American.

In August 2023, Thompson formally graduated from the University of Perpetual Help System DALTA with a bachelor's degree in business administration, Major in Marketing Management. He also received the Dr/BGen Antonio Laperal Tamayo Leadership Plaque for Sports and Athletics award.
