= Mark Molina =

Filipino basketball coach

FEU Tamaraws
- Position: Athletic director
- League: UAAP

Career information
- College: Ateneo

Career history

Coaching
- 1995–1996: Ateneo
- 1997: Ateneo (assistant)
- 1998: Ateneo

Mark Oliver Molina is a Filipino coach serves as the athletic director of the FEU Tamaraws.

== Career ==
=== Playing ===
While studying Management Economics at Ateneo, Molina played for Blue Eagles from 1991 until 1994. Until 1993, he played for Chot Reyes, while the last year under Cris Calilan.

=== Coaching ===
Molina was tapped as Blue Eagles' head coach in 1995, and served until 1996. In 1997, he was demoted as assistant to former La Sallian Perry Ronquillo. Molina returned as head coach in 1998.

=== Commentary ===
Molina worked as a sports commentator for ABS-CBN Sports' UAAP coverages. He also worked when MBA was existing. He currently works as an Analyst for Pba Rush

=== FEU ===
Molina currently works as FEU Tamaraws' athletic director.
