= RJ Abarrientos =

Filipino basketball player (born 1999)

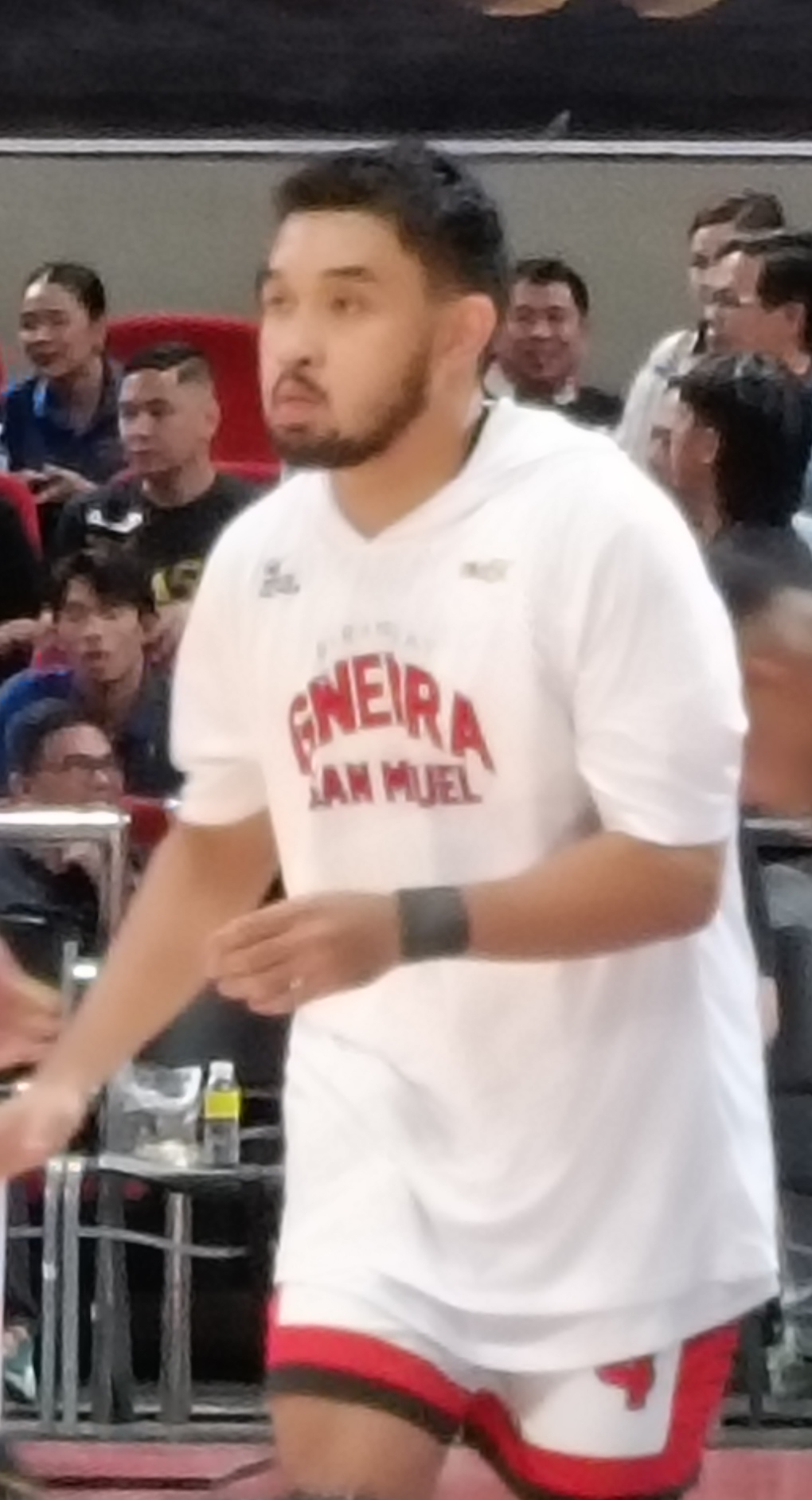
- Abarrientos in 2025

No. 4 – Barangay Ginebra San Miguel
- Position: Point guard
- League: PBA

Personal information
- Born: September 14, 1999 (age 27) Marilao, Bulacan, Philippines
- Listed height: 5 ft 11 in (181 cm)
- Listed weight: 174 lb (79 kg)

Career information
- High school: FEU Diliman (Quezon City); Malayan (Manila)
- College: FEU
- PBA draft: 2024: 1st round, 3rd overall pick
- Drafted by: Barangay Ginebra San Miguel
- Playing career: 2022–present

Career history
- 2022–2023: Ulsan Hyundai Mobis Phoebus
- 2023–2024: Shinshu Brave Warriors
- 2024–present: Barangay Ginebra San Miguel

Career highlights
- PBA champion (2026 Commissioner's); PBA Best Player of the Conference (2026 Commissioner's); PBA All-Star (2026); PBA Rookie of the Year (2025); PBA All-Rookie Team (2025); KBL Rookie of the Year (2023); KBL 3x3 All-Star Game Champion (2023)
Medals
Men's 3x3 basketball
FIBA 3x3 Under-23 World Cup
Gold medal – first place	2018 Xi'an	Shoot-Out Contest

Rhon Jhay Abarrientos (born September 14, 1999) is a Filipino professional basketball player for the Barangay Ginebra San Miguel of the Philippine Basketball Association (PBA). He played college basketball for the FEU Tamaraws.

== Early life ==
Rhon Jhay Abarrientos was born on September 14, 1999. His father died due to illness when he was in high school. RJ was raised by his mother, grandparents, and his maternal uncle and former PBA player Johnny Abarrientos.

== Professional career ==
=== Ulsan Hyundai Mobis Phoebus (2022–2023) ===
On June 14, 2022, Abarrientos decided to forego his remaining years of eligibility left to play for FEU. He was then signed by Ulsan Hyundai Mobis Phoebus of the Korean Basketball League as an Asian player quota, becoming the second Filipino cager to do so after fellow Gilas player, SJ Belangel of Daegu KOGAS Pegasus.

On October 15, 2022, Abarrientos made his KBL debut, scoring 13 points, 7 rebounds, 7 assists and 1 steal in win over Suwon KT Sonicboom, 85–76 at Suwon KT Arena.

On March 30, 2023, Abarrientos was honored KBL Rookie of the Year, averaging 13.6 points, 2.7 triples, 4.8 assists, 2.9 rebounds, and 1.4 steals in 29.1 minutes over 51 games on his 2022–23 debut season.

On June 30, 2023, Abarrientos mutually parted ways with team, thus terminating the remaining two years of his contract.

=== Shinshu Brave Warriors (2023–2024) ===
On July 4, 2023, Abarrientos signed with Shinshu Brave Warriors of the Japanese B.League.

=== Barangay Ginebra San Miguel (2024–present) ===
On July 14, 2024, Abarrientos was selected by the Barangay Ginebra San Miguel as the third overall pick in the 2024 PBA Rookie Draft. On July 29, 2024, he signed a three-year rookie contract with the team.

On October 5, 2025, Abarrientos won the 2024–25 Rookie of the Year award.

On June 10, 2026, Abarrientos won his first Best Player of the Conference award.

== Career statistics ==
=== PBA ===
Legend
GP	Games played	MPG	Minutes per game	FG%	Field-goal percentage
3FG%	3-point field-goal percentage	4P%	4-point field-goal percentage	FT%	Free-throw percentage
RPG	Rebounds per game	APG	Assists per game	SPG	Steals per game
BPG	Blocks per game	PPG	Points per game	**127**	Career high

As of the end of 2024–25 season

==== Season-by-season averages ====
Year	Team	GP	MPG	FG%	3P%	4P%	FT%	RPG	APG	SPG	BPG	PPG
2024–25	Barangay Ginebra	71	25.7	.423	.379	.127	.910	2.8	3.6	.9	.1	12.7
Career		71	25.7	.423	.379	.127	.910	2.8	3.6	.9	.1	12.7

=== B.League ===
Legend
GP	Games played	MPG	Minutes per game
FG%	Field-goal percentage	3P%	3-point field-goal percentage	FT%	Free-throw percentage
RPG	Rebounds per game	APG	Assists per game	SPG	Steals per game
BPG	Blocks per game	PPG	Points per game	**Bold**	Career high

Year	Team	GP	MPG	FG%	3P%	FT%	RPG	APG	SPG	BPG	PPG
2023–24	Shinshu	49	14.2	.348	.318	.820	1.7	2.3	.6	.1	7.8
Career		49	14.2	.348	.318	.820	1.7	2.3	.6	.1	7.8

=== KBL ===
Legend
GP	Games played	MPG	Minutes per game
FG%	Field-goal percentage	3P%	3-point field-goal percentage	FT%	Free-throw percentage
RPG	Rebounds per game	APG	Assists per game	SPG	Steals per game
BPG	Blocks per game	PPG	Points per game	**Bold**	Career high

Year	Team	GP	MPG	FG%	3P%	FT%	RPG	APG	SPG	BPG	PPG
2022–23	Ulsan	56	29.1	.392	.344	.809	2.8	4.8	1.3	.2	13.3
Career		56	29.1	.392	.344	.809	2.8	4.8	1.3	.2	13.3

== Personal life ==
He is married to former UAAP courtside reporter Arlove de Jesus.
