= 2025 Basketball Champions League Asia – East =

Tournament details
- Dates: March 24 – May 31, 2025
- Teams: 8

Final positions
- Champions: (Mongolia) Ulaanbaatar Xac Broncos
- Runners-up: (Chinese Taipei) Taoyuan Pauian Pilots
- Third place: (Indonesia) Pelita Jaya
- Fourth place: (Chinese Taipei) New Taipei Kings

Tournament statistics
- MVP: Ian Miller (Ulaanbaatar Xac Broncos)

Official website
- 2025 Basketball Champions League Asia – East

The 2025 Basketball Champions League Asia – East (BCL Asia – East) was the qualification tournament for the 2025 Basketball Champions League Asia. The tournament involved teams from the East Asia (EABA) and Southeast Asia (SEABA) sub-zones of FIBA Asia. The games were held on March 24 to May 31, 2025, and two teams advanced to the 2025 Basketball Champions League Asia.

== Entrant teams ==
The eight teams participated in the following games.

Teams in the 2025 BCL Asia – East
Association	Team	Domestic league standings
Chinese Taipei (2)	New Taipei Kings	2023–24 P. League+ champion
Chinese Taipei (2)	Taoyuan Pauian Pilots	2023–24 P. League+ runner-up
Mongolia (2)	Ulaanbaatar Xac Broncos	2023–24 The League champion
Mongolia (2)	Bishrelt Metal	2023–24 The League runner-up
Indonesia (1)	Pelita Jaya	2024 Indonesian Basketball League champion
Malaysia (1)	NS Matrix Deers	2023–24 Major Basketball League Malaysia champion
Thailand (1)	Hi-Tech	2024 Basketball Thai League champion
Singapore (1)	Adroit Club	2024 National Basketball League champion

== Group stage ==
The eight teams were drawn into two groups of four teams each for the group stage. The top two teams from each group advanced to the Final Four.

=== Group A ===
Pos	Team	Pld	W	L	PF	PA	PD	Pts	Qualification
1	(Chinese Taipei) Taoyuan Pauian Pilots	6	6	0	527	414	+113	12	Advance to Final Four
2	(Indonesia) Pelita Jaya	6	4	2	492	445	+47	10	Advance to Final Four
3	(Malaysia) NS Matrix Deers	6	1	5	474	530	−56	7	
4	(Mongolia) Bishrelt Metal	6	1	5	443	547	−104	7	

Source: FIBA

24 March	NS Matrix Deers (Malaysia)	95–98(2OT)	(Chinese Taipei) Taoyuan Pauian Pilots	Kuala Lumpur
20:00 (MST)	Scoring by quarter: 20–24, 14–22, 14–15, 30–17, Overtime: 11–11, 6–9
	Pts: Murry 28; Rebs: Obasa 17; Asts: Ong 6	Boxscore	Pts: Jones 24; Rebs: three players 12; Asts: Lu 6	Arena: MABA Stadium; Attendance: 1,600; Referees: Lee Kyoung-Hwan (KOR), Issam Al-Siyabi (OMA), Rakesh Ramalingaiah (IND)

25 March	NS Matrix Deers (Malaysia)	86–98	(Mongolia) Bishrelt Metal	Kuala Lumpur
20:00 (MST)	Scoring by quarter: 19–25, 21–20, 17–30, 29–23
	Pts: Murry 29; Rebs: Letcher-Ellis, Obasa 11; Asts: Ong 5	Boxscore	Pts: Wesley 34; Rebs: Scott 10; Asts: Wesley 8	Arena: MABA Stadium; Attendance: 1,000; Referees: Mohamed Hasan Alsalam (BRN), Lee Kyoung-Hwan (KOR), Rakesh Ramalingaiah (IND)

27 March	NS Matrix Deers (Malaysia)	82–88	(Indonesia) Pelita Jaya	Kuala Lumpur
20:00 (MST)	Scoring by quarter: 27–18, 25–27, 13–18, 17–25
	Pts: Murry 19; Rebs: Obasa 12; Asts: Wong 4	Boxscore	Pts: Jawato 28; Rebs: McDaniels 18; Asts: McDaniels 7	Arena: MABA Stadium; Attendance: 1,600; Referees: Lee Kyoung-Hwan (KOR), Mohamed Hasan Alsalam (BRN), Issam Al-Siyabi (OMA)

5 April	Pelita Jaya (Indonesia)	90–68	(Mongolia) Bishrelt Metal	Jakarta
19:00 (WIB)	Scoring by quarter: 29–25, 16–15, 22–14, 23–14
	Pts: Dickey 25; Rebs: Dickey 14; Asts: McDaniels 7	Boxscore	Pts: Scott 20; Rebs: Scott 11; Asts: Uuganbayar, Scott 5	Arena: PJ Arena; Attendance: 1,000; Referees: Glenn Cornelio (PHI), Ahmad Suleiman Alyousef (JOR), Imran Ali Baig (IND)

6 April	Pelita Jaya (Indonesia)	64–88	(Chinese Taipei) Taoyuan Pauian Pilots	Jakarta
19:00 (WIB)	Scoring by quarter: 16–28, 15–15, 20–22, 13–23
	Pts: McDaniels 28; Rebs: McDaniels 13; Asts: Dickey, Jawato 5	Boxscore	Pts: Brown 24; Rebs: Jones 9 Asts: Pai 7	Arena: PJ Arena; Attendance: 2,000; Referees: Ahmad Suleiman Alyousef (JOR), Glenn Cornelio (PHI), Bandar Al-Suwaidi (QAT)

8 April	Pelita Jaya (Indonesia)	95–59	(Malaysia) NS Matrix Deers	Jakarta
19:00 (WIB)	Scoring by quarter: 21–18, 32–11, 20–16, 22–14
	Pts: Dickey 21; Rebs: Dickey, McDaniels 12; Asts: Dickey, McDaniels 5	Boxscore	Pts: Obasa 18; Rebs: Obasa 10; Asts: De, Heng 4	Arena: PJ Arena; Attendance: 2,000; Referees: Glenn Cornelio (PHI), Imran Ali Baig (IND), Bandar Al-Suwaidi (QAT)

26 April	Taoyuan Pauian Pilots (Chinese Taipei)	66–63	(Indonesia) Pelita Jaya	New Taipei City
20:00 (TST)	Scoring by quarter: 19–10, 16–24, 18–12, 13–17
	Pts: Jones 16; Rebs: Brown 10; Asts: Pai 5	Boxscore	Pts: McLaughlin 24; Rebs: Dickey 11; Asts: three players 3	Arena: Xinzhuang Gymnasium; Referees: Lee Kyoung-Hwan (KOR), Issam Al-Siyabi (OMA), Imran Ali Baig (IND)

27 April	Taoyuan Pauian Pilots (Chinese Taipei)	85–63	(Malaysia) NS Matrix Deers	New Taipei City
20:00 (TST)	Scoring by quarter: 23–16, 29–15, 13–19, 20–13
	Pts: Brown 20; Rebs: Jones 16; Asts: Chen Y., Lu 4	Boxscore	Pts: Letcher 18; Rebs: Letcher 7 Asts: Murry 4	Arena: Xinzhuang Gymnasium; Attendance: 2,130; Referees: Mohamed Hasan Alsalam (BRN), Rakesh Ramalingaiah (IND), Cheon Kam-Jae (KOR)

29 April	Taoyuan Pauian Pilots (Chinese Taipei)	105–66	(Mongolia) Bishrelt Metal	New Taipei City
17:00 (TST)	Scoring by quarter: 23–7, 27–19, 30–14, 25–26
	Pts: Lu 26; Rebs: Boyd 14; Asts: Lu 5	Boxscore	Pts: Wesley 19; Rebs: Sukhbat 7 Asts: Batkhuyag, Dulguun 3	Arena: Xinzhuang Gymnasium; Attendance: 800; Referees: Lee Kyoung-Hwan (KOR), Issam Al-Siyabi (OMA), Rakesh Ramalingaiah (IND)

11 May	Bishrelt Metal (Mongolia)	66–89	(Malaysia) NS Matrix Deers	Ulaanbaatar
17:30 (ULAT)	Scoring by quarter: 19–19, 17–21, 13–17, 17–32
	Pts: Wesley 28; Rebs: Uuganbayar 7 Asts: Wesley 6	Boxscore	Pts: Murry 23; Rebs: Murry 10; Asts: Murry 7	Arena: M bank Arena; Attendance: 720; Referees: Lee Kyoung-Hwan (KOR), Alexey Stepanenko (KAZ), Haruga Iwai (JPN)

12 May	Bishrelt Metal (Mongolia)	63–85	(Chinese Taipei) Taoyuan Pauian Pilots	Ulaanbaatar
20:30 (ULAT)	Scoring by quarter: 15–19, 15–19, 15–26, 18–21
	Pts: Batkhuyag 23; Rebs: Batkhuyag, Dugar-erdene 8 Asts: Batkhuyag 5	Boxscore	Pts: Boyd 19; Rebs: Dieng 11; Asts: Chen L. 8	Arena: M bank Arena; Attendance: 1,564; Referees: Alexey Stepanenko (KAZ), Haruga Iwai (JPN), Cheon Kam-Jae (KOR)

14 May	Bishrelt Metal (Mongolia)	82–92	(Indonesia) Pelita Jaya	Ulaanbaatar
17:30 (ULAT)	Scoring by quarter: 23–25, 17–15, 24–20, 18–32
	Pts: Batkhuyag 24; Rebs: Tsedevsuren 9 Asts: Batkhuyag 9	Boxscore	Pts: McCullough 27; Rebs: McCullough 15; Asts: McCullough 5	Arena: M bank Arena; Attendance: 1,153; Referees: Glenn Cornelio (PHI), Haruga Iwai (JPN), Alexey Stepanenko (KAZ)

=== Group B ===
Pos	Team	Pld	W	L	PF	PA	PD	Pts	Qualification
1	(Mongolia) Ulaanbaatar Xac Broncos	6	6	0	489	383	+106	12	Advance to Final Four
2	(Chinese Taipei) New Taipei Kings	6	4	2	503	466	+37	10	Advance to Final Four
3	(Thailand) Hi-Tech	6	2	4	516	474	+42	8	
4	(Singapore) Adroit Club	6	0	6	378	563	−185	6	

Source: FIBA

27 April	New Taipei Kings (Chinese Taipei)	89–80	(Thailand) Hi-Tech	New Taipei City
17:00 (TST)	Scoring by quarter: 22–23, 32–16, 18–20, 17–21
	Pts: Washburn 24; Rebs: Washburn 11; Asts: Efevberha, Hung 4	Boxscore	Pts: Singletary 27; Rebs: Watkins 13; Asts: Leelaphipatkul 7	Arena: Xinzhuang Gymnasium; Attendance: 2,101; Referees: Issam Al-Siyabi (OMA), Lee Kyoung-Hwan (KOR), Imran Ali Baig (IND)

29 April	New Taipei Kings (Chinese Taipei)	105–65	(Singapore) Adroit Club	New Taipei City
20:00 (TST)	Scoring by quarter: 28–19, 21–17, 25–10, 31–19
	Pts: Su P. 21; Rebs: Sakakini 10; Asts: three players 4	Boxscore	Pts: Kwek 18; Rebs: Pryimak 10; Asts: Lin 4	Arena: Xinzhuang Gymnasium; Attendance: 1,250; Referees: Mohamed Hasan Alsalam (BRN), Imran Ali Baig (IND), Cheon Kam-Jae (KOR)

30 April	New Taipei Kings (Chinese Taipei)	68–81	(Mongolia) Ulaanbaatar Xac Broncos	New Taipei City
20:00 (TST)	Scoring by quarter: 21–17, 15–15, 18–19, 14–30
	Pts: Efevberha 19; Rebs: Johnson, Efevberha 6 Asts: Hung 8	Boxscore	Pts: Tshimanga 29; Rebs: Binderiya, Tolbert 10; Asts: Barsbold 4	Arena: Xinzhuang Gymnasium; Attendance: 1,165; Referees: Lee Kyoung-Hwan (KOR), Mohamed Hasan Alsalam (BRN), Imran Ali Baig (IND)

2 May	Adroit Club (Singapore)	67–119	(Thailand) Hi-Tech	Bangkok
19:00 (ICT)	Scoring by quarter: 15–40, 26–35, 15–16, 11–28
	Pts: Pryimak 19; Rebs: Pryimak, Serheiev 8 Asts: Toh 6	Boxscore	Pts: Singletary 20; Rebs: Watkins 12; Asts: Leelaphipatkul 7	Arena: Nimibutr Stadium; Attendance: 953; Referees: Alexey Stepanenko (KAZ), Haruga Iwai (JPN), Bandar Al-Suwaidi (QAT)

3 May	Adroit Club (Singapore)	41–87	(Mongolia) Ulaanbaatar Xac Broncos	Bangkok
19:00 (ICT)	Scoring by quarter: 10–31, 13–13, 9–21, 9–22
	Pts: Kolchenko 14; Rebs: Serheiev 9 Asts: Wong 8	Boxscore	Pts: Tshimanga 18; Rebs: Tshimanga 11; Asts: Miller 9	Arena: Nimibutr Stadium; Attendance: 105; Referees: Haruga Iwai (JPN), Alexey Stepanenko (KAZ), Khaled Al-Shammari (KUW)

4 May	Hi-Tech (Thailand)	59–63	(Mongolia) Ulaanbaatar Xac Broncos	Bangkok
19:00 (ICT)	Scoring by quarter: 20–19, 12–13, 10–17, 17–14
	Pts: Ejesu 19; Rebs: Ejesu 9 Asts: Singletary 7	Boxscore	Pts: Miller 15; Rebs: Tshimanga 9 Asts: Miller 4	Arena: Nimibutr Stadium; Attendance: 581; Referees: Alexey Stepanenko (KAZ), Bandar Al-Suwaidi (QAT), Haruga Iwai (JPN)

5 May	Adroit Club (Singapore)	64–80	(Chinese Taipei) New Taipei Kings	Bangkok
19:00 (ICT)	Scoring by quarter: 28–24, 9–18, 13–14, 14–24
	Pts: Wong 17; Rebs: Kolchenko, Wong 6 Asts: Wong 5	Boxscore	Pts: Johnson 25; Rebs: Johnson 7 Asts: Hung 6	Arena: Nimibutr Stadium; Attendance: 68; Referees: Bandar Al-Suwaidi (QAT), Khaled Al-Shammari (KUW), Haruga Iwai (JPN)

6 May	Hi-Tech (Thailand)	82–88	(Chinese Taipei) New Taipei Kings	Bangkok
19:00 (ICT)	Scoring by quarter: 27–22, 26–24, 12–21, 17–21
	Pts: Lish 25; Rebs: Singletary 11; Asts: Singletary 5	Boxscore	Pts: Efevberha 39; Rebs: Johnson 13; Asts: Lee, Su S. 3	Arena: Nimibutr Stadium; Attendance: 729; Referees: Alexey Stepanenko (KAZ), Haruga Iwai (JPN), Khaled Al-Shammari (KUW)

7 May	Hi-Tech (Thailand)	96–79	(Singapore) Adroit Club	Bangkok
19:00 (ICT)	Scoring by quarter: 22–13, 23–27, 26–23, 25–16
	Pts: Lish 18; Rebs: Watkins 12; Asts: Singletary, Muangboon 5	Boxscore	Pts: Pryimak 17; Rebs: Serheiev 14; Asts: three players 4	Arena: Nimibutr Stadium; Attendance: 357; Referees: Khaled Al-Shammari (KUW), Alexey Stepanenko (KAZ), Bandar Al-Suwaidi (QAT)

12 May	Ulaanbaatar Xac Broncos (Mongolia)	94–73	(Chinese Taipei) New Taipei Kings	Ulaanbaatar
17:30 (ULAT)	Scoring by quarter: 25–23, 26–20, 20–20, 23–10
	Pts: Miller 23; Rebs: Tolbert 9 Asts: Miller 6	Boxscore	Pts: Efevberha 31; Rebs: Efevberha 12; Asts: Hung 6	Arena: M bank Arena; Attendance: 1,552; Referees: Glenn Cornelio (PHI), Lee Kyoung-Hwan (KOR), Anton Kozlov (KAZ)

14 May	Ulaanbaatar Xac Broncos (Mongolia)	76–62	(Singapore) Adroit Club	Ulaanbaatar
20:30 (ULAT)	Scoring by quarter: 20–13, 20–11, 18–29, 18–9
	Pts: Tushig, Miller 14; Rebs: Tshimanga 12; Asts: Miller 5	Boxscore	Pts: Pryimak 17; Rebs: Pryimak, Serheiev 10; Asts: Wong 7	Arena: M bank Arena; Attendance: 1,161; Referees: Anton Kozlov (KAZ), Lee Kyoung-Hwan (KOR), Cheon Kam-Jae (KOR)

15 May	Ulaanbaatar Xac Broncos (Mongolia)	88–80	(Thailand) Hi-Tech	Ulaanbaatar
20:30 (ULAT)	Scoring by quarter: 21–21, 23–23, 23–19, 21–17
	Pts: Miller 25; Rebs: Tolbert 10; Asts: Barsbold 5	Boxscore	Pts: Singletary 24; Rebs: Singletary 11; Asts: Singletary 8	Arena: M bank Arena; Attendance: 851; Referees: Glenn Cornelio (PHI), Alexey Stepanenko (KAZ), Lee Kyoung-Hwan (KOR)

== Final Four ==
The top two teams from the Final Four advanced to the 2025 Basketball Champions League Asia. Two teams from same country could not qualify to BCL Asia. The final four was held at the M bank Arena in Ulaanbaatar, Mongolia.

Semifinals
(Chinese Taipei) Taoyuan Pauian Pilots	81
(Chinese Taipei) New Taipei Kings	62
(Mongolia) Ulaanbaatar Xac Broncos	85
(Indonesia) Pelita Jaya	79

Finals
(Chinese Taipei) Taoyuan Pauian Pilots	77
(Mongolia) Ulaanbaatar Xac Broncos	86
Third place
(Chinese Taipei) New Taipei Kings	74
(Indonesia) Pelita Jaya	103

=== Semifinals ===
Note: All times are Time in Mongolia (UTC+8)

30 May
18:00

Boxscore

Taoyuan Pauian Pilots (Chinese Taipei)	81–62	(Chinese Taipei) New Taipei Kings
Scoring by quarter: 25–16, 19–18, 17–21, 20–7
Pts: Jones 23; Rebs: Jones 12; Asts: Pai 7		Pts: Efevberha 26; Rebs: Johnson 20; Asts: Johnson 5

M bank Arena, Ulaanbaatar
Attendance: 300
Referees: Yevgeniy Mikheyev (KAZ), Lee Kyoung-Hwan (KOR), Cheon Kam-Jae (KOR)

30 May
21:00

Boxscore

Ulaanbaatar Xac Broncos (Mongolia)	85–79	(Indonesia) Pelita Jaya
Scoring by quarter: 22–17, 19–17, 30–31, 14–14
Pts: Miller 24; Rebs: Barsbold 8 Asts: Miller 8		Pts: McCullough 28; Rebs: McCullough 13; Asts: Withey 3

M bank Arena, Ulaanbaatar
Attendance: 1,204
Referees: Park Kyoung-Jin (KOR), Daigo Urushima (JPN), Alexey Stepanenko (KAZ)

=== Third place game ===
31 May
18:00

Boxscore

New Taipei Kings (Chinese Taipei)	74–103	(Indonesia) Pelita Jaya
Scoring by quarter: 23–29, 21–26, 16–29, 14–19
Pts: Johnson 26; Rebs: Johnson 14; Asts: Su P. 6		Pts: McCullough 31; Rebs: Withey 15; Asts: Arighi 7

M bank Arena, Ulaanbaatar
Attendance: 575
Referees: Park Kyoung-Jin (KOR), Alexey Stepanenko (KAZ), Cheon Kam-Jae (KOR)

=== Finals ===
31 May
21:00

Boxscore

Taoyuan Pauian Pilots (Chinese Taipei)	77–86	(Mongolia) Ulaanbaatar Xac Broncos
Scoring by quarter: 32–30, 13–16, 18–21, 14–19
Pts: Brown 22; Rebs: Boyd 10; Asts: Lu 7		Pts: Miller 30; Rebs: Tshimanga 13; Asts: Miller 8

M bank Arena, Ulaanbaatar
Attendance: 1,054
Referees: Yevgeniy Mikheyev (KAZ), Daigo Urushima (JPN), Lee Kyoung-Hwan (KOR)

== Qualified teams ==
The following two teams qualified for the 2025 Basketball Champions League Asia.

Team	Qualified on	Qualified as
(Mongolia) Ulaanbaatar Xac Broncos	30 May 2025	2025 BCL Asia – East champion
(Chinese Taipei) Taoyuan Pauian Pilots	30 May 2025	2025 BCL Asia – East runner-up
