= 2024 Basketball Champions League Asia qualifying rounds =

Tournament details
- Dates: April 3 – 26, 2024
- Teams: 8

Official website
- 2024 Basketball Champions League Asia qualifying rounds

The qualification rounds for the 2024 Basketball Champions League Asia began on 3 April 2024 and will have two teams advance to the main tournament. It was the first games under the new BCL entity.

== Entrant teams ==
The following eight teams qualified on the following sporting merit. Numbers in brackets show the number of team each association was given.

Teams in the 2024 BCL Asia qualifiers
Association	Team	Domestic league standings
Mongolia (2)	Ulaanbaatar Xac Broncos	2023–24 The League season champions
Mongolia (2)	Bishrelt Metal	2023–24 The League season runners-up
Indonesia (2)	Prawira Bandung	2023 IBL Indonesia champions
Indonesia (2)	Pelita Jaya	2023 IBL Indonesia runners-up
Hong Kong (1)	Eastern	2023–24 Hong Kong A1 Division Championship champion
Malaysia (1)	NS Matrix Deers	2024 Major Basketball League Malaysia champion
Thailand (1)	Hi-Tech	2023 Basketball Thai League champion
Singapore (1)	Adroit Club	2023 National Basketball League (Singapore) champion

== Round 1 ==
Eight clubs consisting of champions and runners-up of domestic leagues from East and South East Asia will compete in the April 3–7 tilt to be held at the UG Arena in Ulaanbaatar, Mongolia.

The placement of the clubs in the groups was based on FIBA Men's World Ranking.

=== Group A ===
Pos	Team	Pld	W	L	PF	PA	PD	Pts	Qualification
1	Hong Kong Eastern	3	2	1	239	230	+9	5	Advance to Round 2
2	(Indonesia) Prawira Bandung	3	2	1	262	239	+23	5	Advance to qualification game
3	(Malaysia) NS Matrix Deers	3	1	2	265	269	−4	4	Advance to qualification game
4	(Mongolia) Bishrelt Metal (H)	3	1	2	233	261	−28	4	

Source: FIBA
(H) Hosts

3 April 2024	NS Matrix Deers (Malaysia)	73–80	Hong Kong Eastern	Ulanbataar, Mongolia
12:30 (4:30 GMT)	Scoring by quarter: 20–23, 16–11, 12–22, 25–24
	Pts: Tolbert 23; Rebs: Tolbert 14; Asts: Johnson 5	Boxscore	Pts: Gilbert 26; Rebs: Mclaughlin 11; Asts: Gilbert 5	Arena: UG Arena; Referees: Daigo Urushima (JAP), Chuen Wing Leong (SGP), Kamjae Cheon (KOR)

3 April 2024	Prawira Bandung (Indonesia)	83–66	(Mongolia) Bishrelt Metal	Ulanbataar, Mongolia
20:00 (12:00 GMT)	Scoring by quarter: 21–16, 19–15, 18–12, 25–23
	Pts: Hester 21; Rebs: Gist 9 Asts: Yudha Saputera 7	Boxscore	Pts: Cylla 23; Rebs: Tumenbayar 9 Asts: Gantsolmon 5	Arena: UG Arena; Referees: Preeda Muongmee (THA), Haruga Iwai (JAP), Anton Kozlov (KAZ)

4 April 2024	Hong Kong Eastern	79–74	(Indonesia) Prawira Bandung	Ulanbataar, Mongolia
15:00 (7:00 GMT)	Scoring by quarter: 22–19, 24–16, 18–18, 15–21
	Pts: Gilbert 25; Rebs: Mclaughlin 11; Asts: Mclaughlin 7	Boxscore	Pts: Francis 29; Rebs: Hester 8 Asts: Hester 4	Arena: UG Arena; Referees: Preeda Muongmee (THA), Haruga Iwai (JPN), Anton Kozlov (KAZ)

4 April 2024	Bishrelt Metal (Mongolia)	84–98	(Malaysia) NS Matrix Deers	Ulanbataar, Mongolia
17:30 (9:30 GMT)	Scoring by quarter: 21–32, 16–18, 26–27, 21–21
	Pts: Cylla 20; Rebs: Cylla 8 Asts: Ochefu 5	Boxscore	Pts: Tolbert 22; Rebs: Tolbert 11; Asts: Chun Hong Ting 8	Arena: UG Arena; Referees: Chuon Wing Leong (SGP), Nattapong Jontapa (THA), Kamjae Cheon (KOR)

6 April 2024	Prawira Bandung (Indonesia)	105–94	(Malaysia) NS Matrix Deers	Ulanbataar, Mongolia
12:30 (4:30 GMT)	Scoring by quarter: 21–21, 31–24, 23–30, 30–19
	Pts: Francis 31; Rebs: Gist 11; Asts: Francis 6	Boxscore	Pts: Taishaun 31; Rebs: Taishaun 9 Asts: Taishaun 6	Arena: UG Arena; Referees: Preeda Muongmee (THA), Xiao Zhang (CHN), Chuen Wing Leong (SGP)

6 April 2024	Hong Kong Eastern	80–83	(Mongolia) Bishrelt Metal	Ulanbataar, Mongolia
17:30 (9:30 GMT)	Scoring by quarter: 21–18, 23–17, 19–25, 17–23
	Pts: Mclaughlin 22; Rebs: Mclaughlin 12; Asts: Gilbert 10	Boxscore	Pts: Cylla 26; Rebs: Amarbayasgalan 13; Asts: Tumenbayar 6	Arena: UG Arena; Referees: Alexey Stepanenko (KAZ), Kyounghwan Lee (KOR), Nattapong Jontapa (THA)

=== Group B ===
Pos	Team	Pld	W	L	PF	PA	PD	Pts	Qualification
1	(Indonesia) Pelita Jaya	3	3	0	270	228	+42	6	Advance to Round 2
2	(Thailand) Hi-Tech	3	2	1	317	280	+37	5	Advance to qualification game
3	(Mongolia) Ulaanbaatar Xac Broncos (H)	3	1	2	292	278	+14	4	Advance to qualification game
4	(Singapore) Adroit	3	0	3	208	301	−93	3	

Source: FIBA
(H) Hosts

3 April 2024	Hi-Tech (Thailand)	81–99	(Indonesia) Pelita Jaya	Ulanbataar, Mongolia
15:00 (7:00 GMT)	Scoring by quarter: 18–25, 24–20, 17–33, 22–21
	Pts: Lish 25; Rebs: Morgan 4 Asts: Elliott 5	Boxscore	Pts: McLaughlin 20; Rebs: Tew 15; Asts: Brownlee 6	Arena: UG Arena; Referees: Chun Yip Yuen (HKG), Xiao Zhang (CHN), Houlu Song (CHN)

3 April 2024	Ulaanbaatar Xac Broncos (Mongolia)	98–74	(Singapore) Adroit	Ulanbataar, Mongolia
17:30 (9:30 GMT)	Scoring by quarter: 28–20, 25–20, 21–16, 24–18
	Pts: Battuvshin 16; Rebs: Ganga 8 Asts: Battuvshin 5	Boxscore	Pts: Kelly 21; Rebs: Kelly 9 Asts: Liew 6	Arena: UG Arena; Referees: Owe Siong Chan (MYS), Alexey Stepanenko (KAZ), Kyounghwan Lee (KOR)

4 April 2024	Adroit (Singapore)	70–121	(Thailand) Hi-Tech	Ulanbataar, Mongolia
12:30 (4:30 GMT)	Scoring by quarter: 18–27, 9–27, 22–38, 21–29
	Pts: Kelly 24; Rebs: Kelly 8 Asts: Lok Yao Tor 3	Boxscore	Pts: Allen 29; Rebs: Allen 12; Asts: Elliott 6	Arena: UG Arena; Referees: Xiao Zhang (CHN), Chun Yip Yuen (HKG), Owe Shiong Chan (MYS)

4 April 2024	Pelita Jaya (Indonesia)	89–83	(Mongolia) Ulaanbaatar Xac Broncos	Ulanbataar, Mongolia
20:00 (12:00 GMT)	Scoring by quarter: 22–25, 23–17, 18–23, 26–18
	Pts: Brownlee 26; Rebs: Brownlee 12; Asts: Brownlee 6	Boxscore	Pts: Battuvshin 16; Rebs: Moss 7 Asts: Battuvshin 8	Arena: UG Arena; Referees: Daigo Urushima (JPN), Alexey Stepanenko (KAZ), Kyounghwan Lee (KOR)

6 April 2024	Adroit (Singapore)	64–82	(Indonesia) Pelita Jaya	Ulanbataar, Mongolia
15:00 (7:00 GMT)	Scoring by quarter: 12–30, 20–15, 16–12, 16–25
	Pts: Kelly 26; Rebs: Kelly 11; Asts: three players 3	Boxscore	Pts: McLaughlin 25; Rebs: two players 6 Asts: McLaughlin 7	Arena: UG Arena; Referees: Chun Yip Yuen (HKG), Houlu Song (CHN), Anton Kozlov (KAZ)

6 April 2024	Hi-Tech (Thailand)	115–111(OT)	(Mongolia) Ulaanbaatar Xac Broncos	Ulanbataar, Mongolia
20:00 (12:00 GMT)	Scoring by quarter: 21–22, 29–22, 21–26, 28–29, Overtime: 16–12
	Pts: Lish 34; Rebs: Allen 23; Asts: Lish 7	Boxscore	Pts: Myles 34; Rebs: Myles 7 Asts: Myles 6	Arena: UG Arena; Referees: Daigo Urushima (JPN), Owe Shiong Chan (MYS), Haruga Iwai (JPN)

=== Qualification games ===
The qualification games were single-elimination games to decide the last two teams advancing to Round 2.

7 April 2024	Prawira Bandung (Indonesia)	94–83	(Mongolia) Ulaanbaatar Xac Broncos	Ulanbataar, Mongolia
17:30 (9:30 GMT)	Scoring by quarter: 20–15, 24–23, 23–20, 27–25
	Pts: Francis 24; Rebs: Gist 13; Asts: two players 4	Boxscore	Pts: Myles 19; Rebs: two players 6 Asts: Ariunbold 5	Arena: UG Arena; Referees: Daigo Urushima (JPN), Chuen Wing Leong (SGP), Kyounghwan Lee (KOR)

7 April 2024	Hi-Tech (Thailand)	93–96	(Malaysia) NS Matrix Deers	Ulanbataar, Mongolia
20:00 (12:00 GMT)	Scoring by quarter: 23–18, 21–35, 20–26, 29–17
	Pts: Allen 27; Rebs: Morgan 12; Asts: Elliott 6	Boxscore	Pts: Johnson 19; Rebs: Johnson 8 Asts: Johnson 9	Arena: UG Arena

== Round 2 ==
The second round will be played from 23 to 26 April 2024 in Jakarta, Indonesia, in a single round-robin format with the four teams that advanced from the first round. Points from Round 1 are not carried into this round. The top two teams advance to the main tournament of the 2024 Basketball Champions League Asia. Matches are going to be held at the BritAma Arena in Kelapa Gading, North Jakarta.

Pos	Team	Pld	W	L	PF	PA	PD	Pts	Qualification
1	(Indonesia) Pelita Jaya (Q, H)	3	3	0	258	217	+41	6	Qualification to 2024 Basketball Champions League Asia
2	(Malaysia) NS Matrix Deers (Q)	3	2	1	269	278	−9	5	Qualification to 2024 Basketball Champions League Asia
3	(Indonesia) Prawira Bandung (H)	3	1	2	207	229	−22	4	
4	Hong Kong Eastern	3	0	3	218	228	−10	3	

Updated to match(es) played on 26 April 2024. Source: FIBA
(H) Hosts; (Q) Qualified for the phase indicated

23 April 2024	Pelita Jaya (Indonesia)	94–79	(Malaysia) NS Matrix Deers	Jakarta, Indonesia
16:30 (09:30 GMT)	Scoring by quarter: 27–16, 23–24, 21–20, 23–19
	Pts: McDaniels 24; Rebs: Brownlee 8 Asts: McLaughlin 6	Boxscore	Pts: Chun Hong Ting 24; Rebs: Tolbert 13; Asts: Johnson 5	Arena: The BritAma Arena; Referees: Glenn Cornelio (PHI), Preeda Muongmee (THA), Kamjae Cheon (KOR)

23 April 2024	Hong Kong Eastern	50–53	(Indonesia) Prawira Bandung	Jakarta, Indonesia
20:00 (13:00 GMT)	Scoring by quarter: 17–12, 16–14, 5–18, 12–9
	Pts: Mclaughlin 17; Rebs: Gilbert 19; Asts: Gilbert	Boxscore	Pts: Hester 19; Rebs: Hester 15; Asts: Gist	Arena: The BritAma Arena; Referees: Daigo Urushima (JPN), Kyounghwan Lee (KOR), Chuen Wing Leong (SGP)

24 April 2024	NS Matrix Deers (Malaysia)	99–97(OT)	Hong Kong Eastern	Jakarta, Indonesia
16:30 (09:30 GMT)	Scoring by quarter: 21–27, 20–28, 28–19, 18–13, Overtime: 12–10
	Pts: Taishaun 31; Rebs: Chun Hong Ting 9 Asts: Taishaun 9	Boxscore	Pts: Eisendorf 21; Rebs: Mclaughlin 12; Asts: two players 6	Arena: The BritAma Arena; Referees: Preeda Muongmee (THA), Kyounghwan Lee (KOR), Suebpong Wichaipin (THA)

24 April 2024	Prawira Bandung (Indonesia)	67–88	(Indonesia) Pelita Jaya	Jakarta, Indonesia
20:00 (13:00 GMT)	Scoring by quarter: 11−29, 22−22, 18−19, 16−19
	Pts: Francis 16; Rebs: Hester 11; Asts: Saputera 3	Boxscore	Pts: McLaughlin 24; Rebs: McDaniels 17; Asts: McLaughlin 3	Arena: The BritAma Arena; Referees: Daigo Urushima (JPN), Glenn Cornelio (PHI), Chuen Wing Leong (SGP)

26 April 2024	Prawira Bandung (Indonesia)	87–91(OT)	(Malaysia) NS Matrix Deers	Jakarta, Indonesia
16:30 (09:30 GMT)	Scoring by quarter: 16−21, 17−27, 21–10, 22–18, Overtime: 11−15
	Pts: Francis 31; Rebs: Gist 9 Asts: Saputera 5	Boxscore	Pts: Rosser 25; Rebs: Chun Hong Ting 11; Asts: Taishaun 8	Arena: The BritAma Arena; Referees: Glenn Cornelio (PHI), Kyounghwan Lee (KOR), Chuen Wing Leong (SGP)

26 April 2024	Pelita Jaya (Indonesia)	76–71	Hong Kong Eastern	Jakarta, Indonesia
20:00 (13:00 GMT)	Scoring by quarter: 22−14, 18−18, 17−21, 19−18
	Pts: McDaniels 31; Rebs: McDaniels 13; Asts: McLaughlin 5	Boxscore	Pts: Mclaughlin 15; Rebs: Mclaughlin 11; Asts: Eisendorf 5	Arena: The BritAma Arena; Referees: Preeda Muongmee (THA), Kyounghwan Lee (KOR), Suebpong Wichaipin (THA)

== Qualified teams for the 2024 Basketball Champions League Asia ==
The following two teams qualified for the 2024 Basketball Champions League Asia:

Team	Qualified on	Qualified as
(Indonesia) Pelita Jaya	24 April 2024	Round 2 winners
(Malaysia) NS Matrix Deers	26 April 2024	Round 2 runner-up
