= Earl Clark =

American basketball player (born 1988)

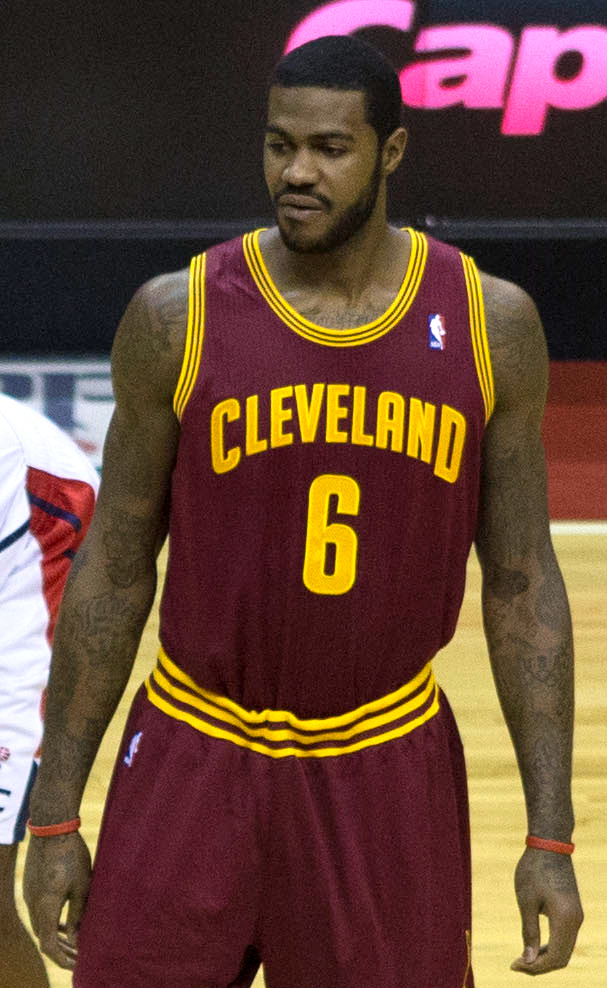
- Clark with the Cleveland Cavaliers in 2013

No. 6 – South Gobi Broncos
- Position: Power forward
- League: The League; East Asia Super League

Personal information
- Born: January 17, 1988 (age 38) Plainfield, New Jersey, U.S.
- Listed height: 6 ft 9 in (2.06 m)
- Listed weight: 234 lb (106 kg)

Career information
- High school: Rahway (Rahway, New Jersey)
- College: Louisville (2006–2009)
- NBA draft: 2009: 1st round, 14th overall pick
- Drafted by: Phoenix Suns
- Playing career: 2009–present

Career history
- 2009–2010: Phoenix Suns
- 2010: → Iowa Energy
- 2010–2012: Orlando Magic
- 2012–2013: Los Angeles Lakers
- 2013–2014: Cleveland Cavaliers
- 2014: New York Knicks
- 2014: Rio Grande Valley Vipers
- 2014–2015: Shandong Golden Stars
- 2015: Brooklyn Nets
- 2015–2016: Bakersfield Jam
- 2016: Delaware 87ers
- 2016: Henan Roaring Elephants
- 2016–2018: Beşiktaş
- 2018–2019: Budućnost VOLI
- 2019–2020: Burgos
- 2020: Anyang KGC
- 2020–2021: Gran Canaria
- 2021: Al-Manama
- 2021: Ulsan Hyundai Mobis Phoebus
- 2022: Cariduros de Fajardo
- 2022: NLEX Road Warriors
- 2023: Gigantes de Carolina
- 2023–2025: Hsinchu Toplus Lioneers
- 2025–2026: Club Atlético Aguada
- 2026–present: South Gobi Broncos

Career highlights
- Montenegrin League champion (2019); Montenegrin Cup winner (2019); Turkish League All-Star (2017); McDonald's All-American (2006); Fourth-team Parade All-American (2006)
- Stats at NBA.com
- Stats at Basketball Reference

Earl Rashad Clark (born January 17, 1988) is an American professional basketball player for the South Gobi Broncos of the Mongolian The League and the East Asia Super League. He played college basketball for the University of Louisville and was drafted 14th overall by the Phoenix Suns in the 2009 NBA draft.

== High school career ==
Clark grew up in Plainfield, New Jersey and attended Rahway High School in Rahway, New Jersey. There, he scored 1,245 career points. As a senior, he averaged 25.2 points, 13.2 rebounds and 5 assists per game. He was a 2006 McDonald's All-American, as well as a fourth-team Parade All-American.

Considered a five-star recruit by Rivals.com, Clark was listed as the No. 8 small forward and the No. 22 player in the nation in 2006.

== College career ==
As a freshman for the Louisville Cardinals, along with Derrick Caracter, Edgar Sosa, and Jerry Smith, the young group struggled early in the 2006–07 season. The team went on to win 8 out of its last 10 games, earning a bid to the NCAA Tournament.

In the first game of the 2007 NCAA Tournament, he scored 12 points, 4 rebounds and 4 steals against Stanford.

Clark decided not to put his name in the 2008 NBA Draft and to return to the University of Louisville for the 2008–2009 season.

In the 2008–2009 season, Clark, along with future NBA player Terrence Williams, led Louisville to the Big East Title, as well as a #1 ranking, the first ever in the University of Louisville's history.

== Professional career ==
=== Phoenix Suns (2009–2010) ===
Early in his junior season, Clark announced that he would forgo his senior season to enter the 2009 NBA draft. On April 4, 2009, agent Dan Fegan told ESPN that he had signed Clark as a client shortly after the end of Louisville's 2008–09 season, which under NCAA rules ended Clark's college eligibility.

Clark was drafted 14th overall by the Phoenix Suns in the 2009 NBA draft. He made his first career three pointer on January 28, 2010. Clark was sent to the Iowa Energy of the NBA Development League on March 15, 2010, after only averaging 2.7 points, 1.1 rebounds, and 7.6 minutes in 45 games.

=== Orlando Magic (2010–2012) ===
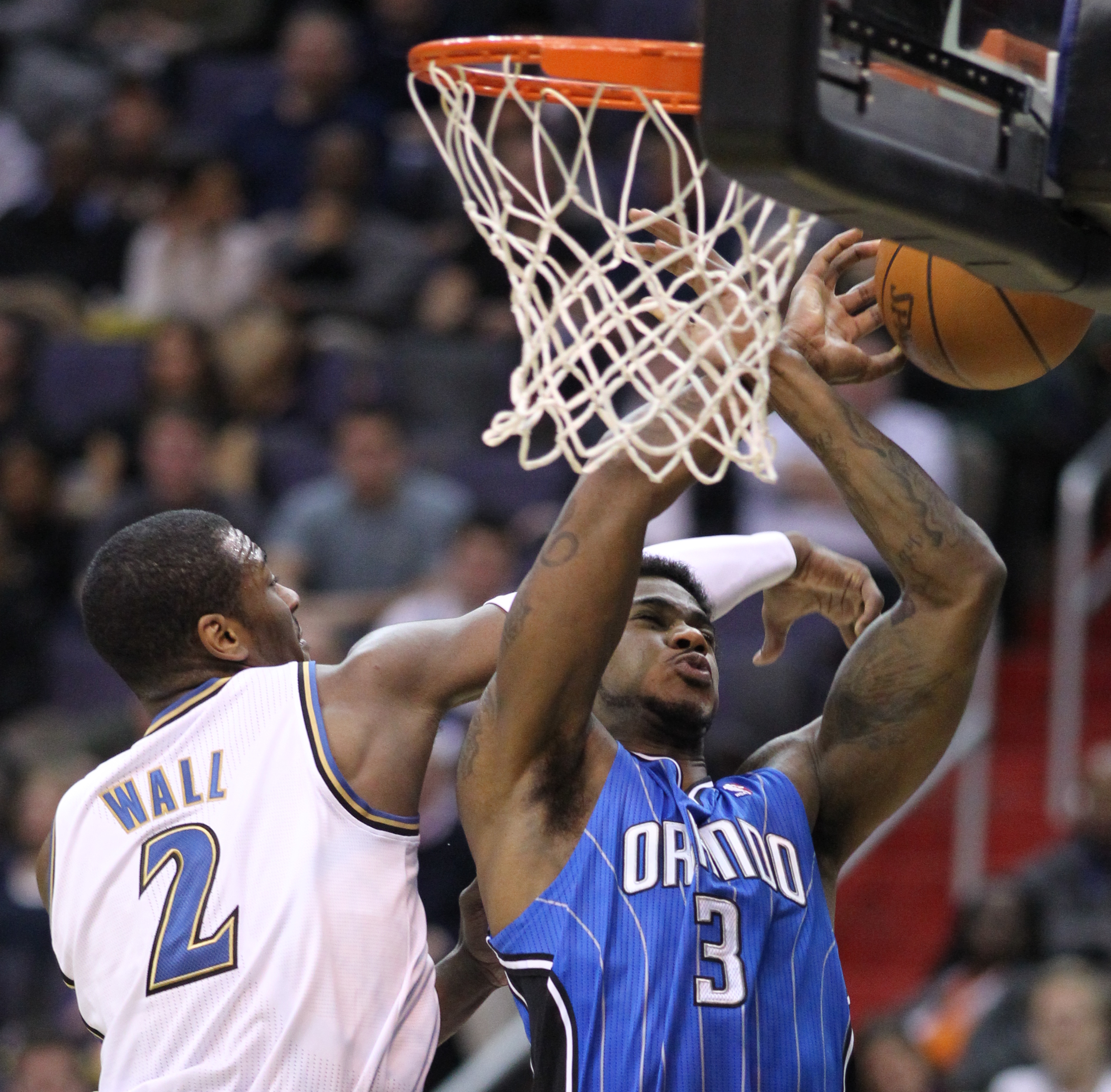
Clark battling with John Wall in 2011

On December 18, 2010, Clark was traded to the Orlando Magic along with Jason Richardson and Hedo Türkoğlu for Vince Carter, Marcin Gortat, Mickaël Piétrus, a 2011 first-round draft pick and $3 million cash. On April 16, 2012, he recorded his first double-double with 14 points and 11 rebounds.

In August 2011 during the 2011 NBA lockout, Clark signed a one-year contract with Zhejiang Lions in China. However, the next month, he asked to leave the team for family reasons after not appearing in a game for the club. He re-signed with Orlando in December.

=== Los Angeles Lakers (2012–2013) ===
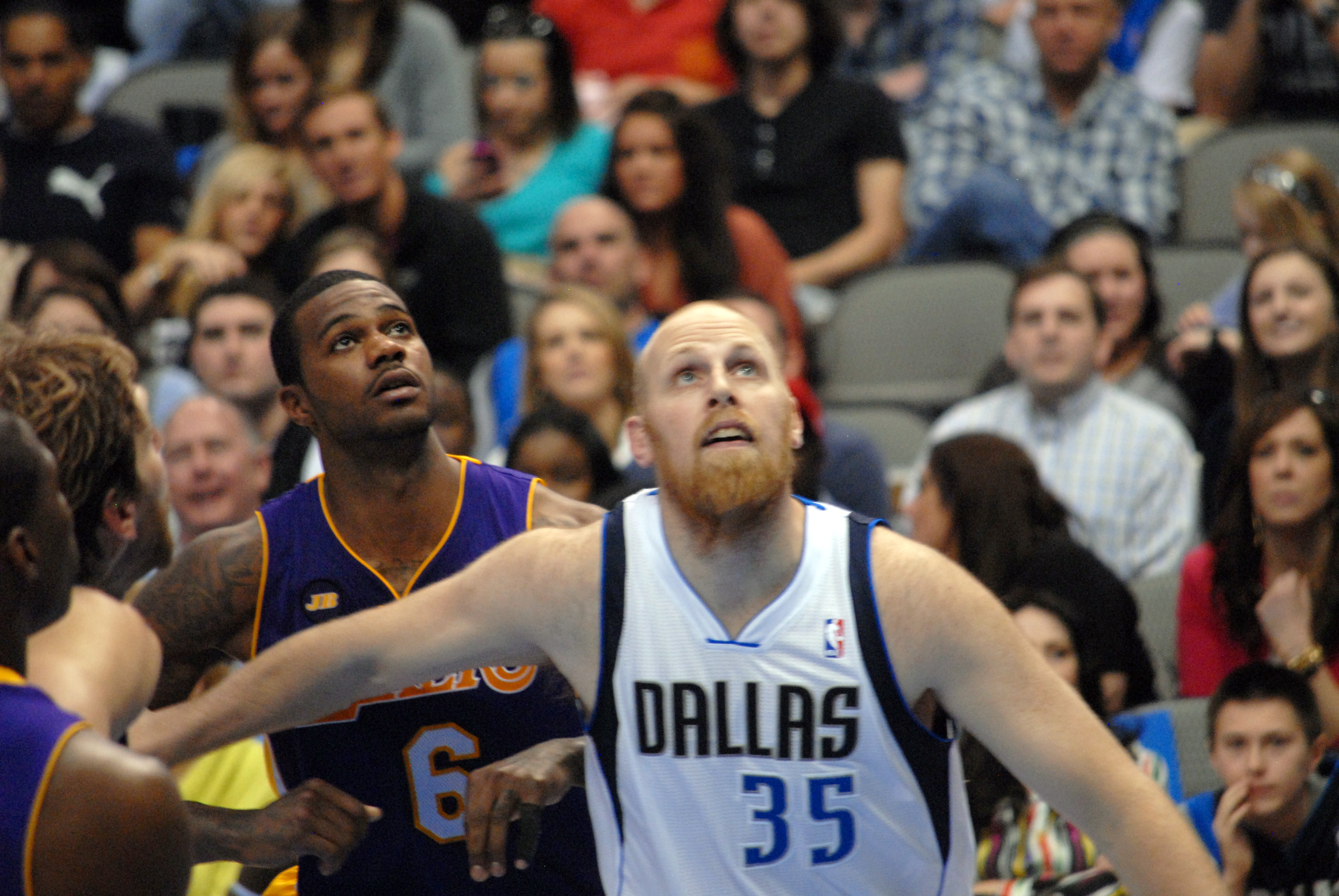
Clark boxed out by Chris Kaman of the Dallas Mavericks in a 2013 game

On August 10, 2012, Clark was traded to the Los Angeles Lakers as part of a four-team trade that sent Dwight Howard to the Lakers. The Denver Nuggets acquired Andre Iguodala, the Philadelphia 76ers received Andrew Bynum and Jason Richardson, and the Orlando Magic got Arron Afflalo, Al Harrington, Nikola Vučević, Maurice Harkless, Josh McRoberts, Christian Eyenga, and one protected future first-round pick from each of the other three teams. The Lakers also acquired Chris Duhon from the Magic in the trade. On January 9, 2013, Clark had a breakthrough night, playing 27 minutes and setting personal bests with 22 points and 13 rebounds against the San Antonio Spurs. He had been playing sparingly, but he received extended playing time after injuries to Lakers big men Dwight Howard, Pau Gasol, and Jordan Hill. Coach Mike D'Antoni called Clark's performance "phenomenal"; it was only the second double-double of Clark's career. Clark had three double-doubles over six games, and he was named a permanent starter even after Gasol returned. After three years of limited opportunities, Clark was averaging nearly 30 minutes a game. However, he appeared tired by March, and D'Antoni replaced Clark with Gasol in the starting lineup.

=== Cleveland Cavaliers (2013–2014) ===
On July 12, 2013, Clark signed with the Cleveland Cavaliers.

On February 20, 2014, Clark was traded to the Philadelphia 76ers along with Henry Sims and two future second-round picks in exchange for Spencer Hawes. He was waived by the 76ers the next day.

=== New York Knicks (2014) ===
On February 27, 2014, Clark signed a 10-day contract with the New York Knicks. On March 10, 2014, he signed a second 10-day contract with the Knicks. On March 20, 2014, the Knicks did not offer him a rest of season contract.

=== Rio Grande Valley Vipers (2014) ===
On September 25, 2014, Clark signed with the Memphis Grizzlies. However, he was later waived by the Grizzlies on October 22, 2014. He was then claimed off waivers by the Houston Rockets on October 24, only to be waived again three days later.

On October 31, 2014, Clark was acquired by the Iowa Energy of the NBA Development League as an affiliate player of the Memphis Grizzlies. However, he was traded to the Rio Grande Valley Vipers the next day.

=== Shandong Golden Stars (2014–2015) ===
On December 10, 2014, Clark signed with the Shandong Golden Stars of the Chinese Basketball Association after reaching a buyout with the Rio Grande Valley Vipers. In 19 games for Shandong, he averaged 26.7 points and 10.3 rebounds per game.

=== Brooklyn Nets (2015) ===
On March 27, 2015, Clark signed a 10-day contract with the Brooklyn Nets. On April 6, 2015, he signed a multi-year deal with the Nets. On August 10, 2015, he was waived by the Nets.

=== Bakersfield Jam (2015–2016) ===
On October 30, 2015, Clark was acquired by the Bakersfield Jam of the NBA Development League.

=== Delaware 87ers (2016) ===
On January 16, 2016, Clark was traded to the Delaware 87ers in exchange for a 2016 second-round pick. Three days later, he made his debut for the 87ers in a 127–112 loss to the Westchester Knicks, recording four points, four rebounds, one assist, two steals and two blocks in 21 minutes off the bench. On March 19, he was waived by Delaware.

=== Beşiktaş (2016–2018) ===
On May 24, 2016, Clark signed with Henan Roaring Elephants of the Chinese National Basketball League.

On August 18, 2016, Clark signed with Turkish club Beşiktaş for the 2016–17 season. On July 3, 2017, he re-signed with Beşiktaş for one more season. He also made the 2017 BSL All Star Game

=== Budućnost VOLI (2018–2019) ===
On June 16, 2018, Clark signed with Budućnost VOLI of the Montenegrin Basketball League for the 2018–19 season.

=== San Pablo Burgos (2019–2020) ===
On July 19, 2019, Clark signed with Spanish club San Pablo Burgos. Clark became their "franchise player", averaging 12.2 points and 5.9 rebounds per game in the Liga ACB. He travelled to the US to be with his family after the ACB league cancellation in the midst of the COVID-19 pandemic. Having troubles to return to Spain during the lockdown to resume practice sessions, San Pablo Burgos and Clark mutually decided to part ways on May 15, 2020.

=== Anyang KGC (2020) ===
On June 19, 2020, Clark signed with the Korean team Anyang KGC.

=== Gran Canaria (2020–2021) ===
On December 22, 2020, Clark signed with Herbalife Gran Canaria of the Spanish Liga ACB.

On December 31, 2021, Clark signed with the Sioux Falls Skyforce of the NBA G League. Clark was then later waived on January 21, 2022, without playing a game for the team.

=== NLEX Road Warriors (2022) ===
In August 2022, he signed with the NLEX Road Warriors of the Philippine Basketball Association (PBA) as the team's import for the 2022–23 PBA Commissioner's Cup.

=== Gigantes de Carolina (2023) ===
On February 4, 2023, he signed with Gigantes de Carolina of the Baloncesto Superior Nacional (BSN).

=== Hsinchu Toplus Lioneers (2023–2025) ===
On September 13, 2024, Clark re-signed with the Hsinchu Toplus Lioneers of the Taiwan Professional Basketball League (TPBL). On May 14, 2025, the Hsinchu Toplus Lioneers announced that Clark left the team.

== Career statistics ==
Legend
GP	Games played	GS	Games started	MPG	Minutes per game
FG%	Field-goal percentage	3P%	3-point field-goal percentage	FT%	Free-throw percentage
RPG	Rebounds per game	APG	Assists per game	SPG	Steals per game
BPG	Blocks per game	PPG	Points per game	PIR	Performance index rating
**Bold**	Career high

=== NBA ===
==== Regular season ====
Year	Team	GP	GS	MPG	FG%	3P%	FT%	RPG	APG	SPG	BPG	PPG
2009–10	Phoenix	51	0	7.5	.371	**.400**	.722	1.2	.4	.1	.3	2.7
2010–11	Phoenix	9	0	8.0	.387	.000	.500	1.9	.4	.1	.3	3.2
2010–11	Orlando	33	0	11.9	**.441**	.000	.595	2.5	.2	.2	.5	4.1
2011–12	Orlando	45	1	12.4	.367	.000	**.724**	2.8	.4	.3	**.7**	2.7
2012–13	L. A. Lakers	**59**	**36**	**23.1**	.440	.337	.697	**5.5**	**1.1**	**.6**	**.7**	**7.3**
2013–14	Cleveland	45	17	15.5	.375	.345	.583	2.8	.4	.4	.4	5.2
2013–14	New York	9	0	7.8	.333	.167	.800	1.8	.2	.1	**.7**	2.6
2014–15	Brooklyn	10	0	9.3	.367	.286	.250	2.3	.3	.3	.4	2.7
Career		261	54	13.9	.403	.328	.664	3.0	.5	.3	.5	4.4

==== Playoffs ====
Year	Team	GP	GS	MPG	FG%	3P%	FT%	RPG	APG	SPG	BPG	PPG
2010	Phoenix	3	0	4.0	.333	.000	**1.000**	.7	.3	.3	.0	1.3
2011	Orlando	1	0	6.0	.333	.000	.000	4.0	**1.0**	**1.0**	**1.0**	2.0
2012	Orlando	**5**	0	17.6	**.444**	.000	.571	**6.6**	.2	.4	**1.0**	**4.0**
2013	L. A. Lakers	4	**1**	**20.5**	.368	.000	.000	3.0	.3	.3	.3	3.5
2015	Brooklyn	2	0	6.5	.200	**.667**	.000	1.0	.0	.5	.0	3.0
Career		15	1	13.5	.358	.286	.667	3.5	.3	.4	.5	3.1
