= Ian Miller (basketball) =

American basketball player (born 1991)

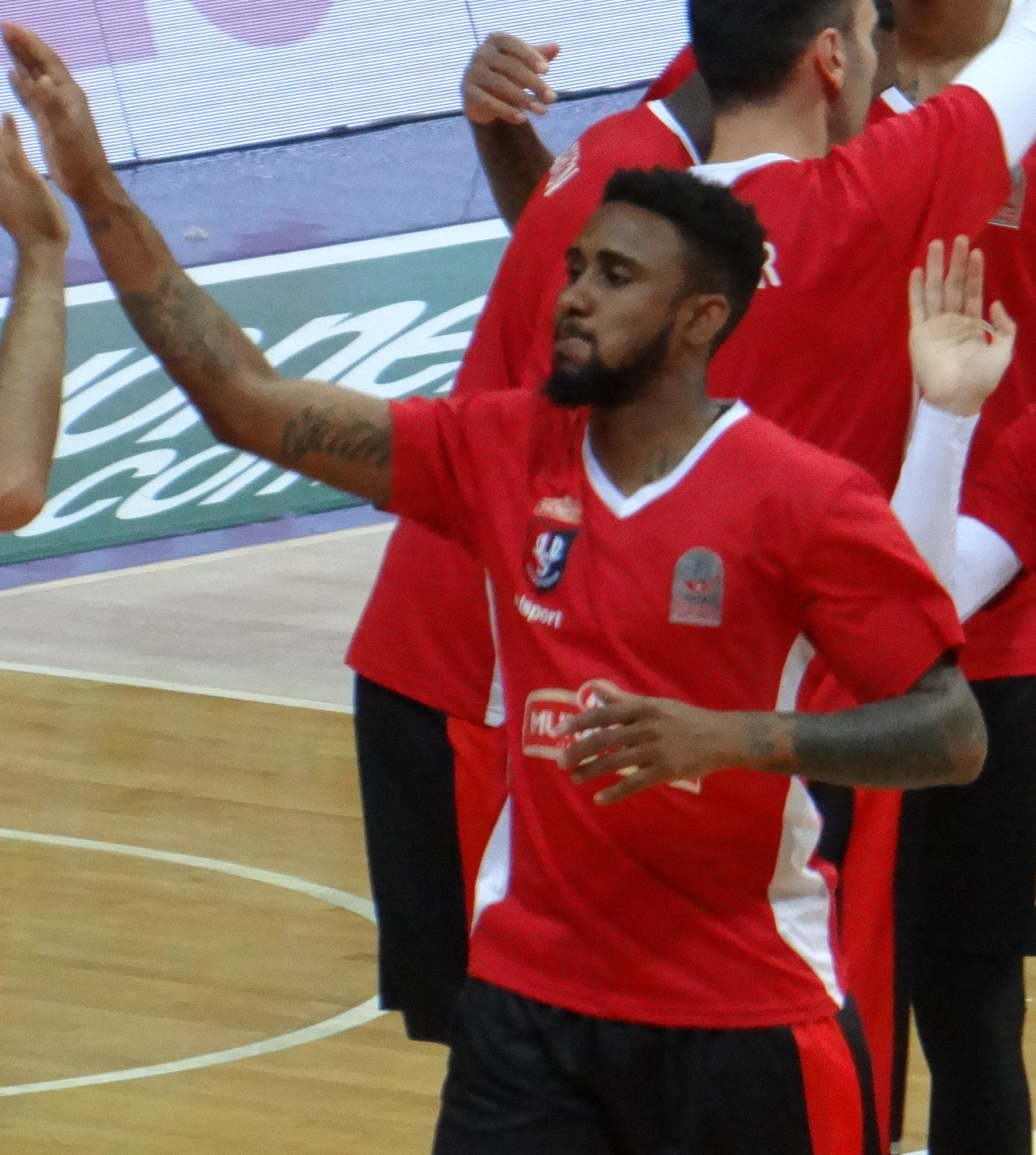
- Miller with Uşak Sportif in 2017

No. 44 – Khasin Khuleguud
- Position: Shooting guard / point guard
- League: The League

Personal information
- Born: September 28, 1991 (age 35)
- Listed height: 6 ft 3 in (1.91 m)
- Listed weight: 198 lb (90 kg)

Career information
- High school: United Faith Christian Academy (Charlotte, North Carolina)
- College: Florida State (2010–2014)
- NBA draft: 2014: undrafted
- Playing career: 2014–present

Career history
- 2014–2015: Aurora Jesi
- 2015–2016: Auxilium CUS Torino
- 2016: Tenezis Verona
- 2016–2017: Astana
- 2017–2018: Uşak Sportif
- 2018: BCM Gravelines
- 2018–2019: Hapoel Gilboa Galil
- 2019–2020: Chorale Roanne
- 2020–2021: Promitheas Patras
- 2021: Cholet Basket
- 2021: Peristeri
- 2021–2022: Büyükçekmece Basketbol
- 2022–2023: Enisey
- 2023–2024: OGM Ormanspor
- 2024: Juventus Utena
- 2024–2025: MKE Ankaragücü
- 2025–present: Khasin Khuleguud

Career highlights
- The league winner (2026); BCL Asia All-Star Five (2025); BCL Asia All-Star Five (2025); BCL Asia East winner (2025); BCL Asia East MVP (2025); The League winner (2025); The League Finals MVP (2025); Greek Super Cup winner (2020); Greek Super Cup Finals Top Scorer (2020); Kazakhstan League champion (2017); Kazakhstan Cup winner (2017); Serie A2 champion (2015); ACC Tournament winner (2014); ACC Sixth Man of the Year (2014); All-ACC Honorable Mention (2014); Fourth-team Parade All-American (2010)

Ian Bennet Miller (born September 28, 1991) is an American professional basketball player for Khasin Khuleguud of The League. He played college basketball for Florida State University before playing professionally in Italy, Kazakhstan, Turkey, France, Israel, Greece and Mongolia.

== Early life and college career ==
Miller attended United Faith Christian Academy in Charlotte, North Carolina, where he averaged 22 points, 6 rebounds and 6 assists, leading United Faith to the 1-A State Championship as a senior.

Miller played college basketball for Florida State University's Seminoles, where he averaged 13.7 points and 2.5 rebounds per game in a non-starting role as a senior. Miller also topped the charts for sixth men in assists (2.96), steals (0.87) and free throw percentage (.877). Miller was named ACC Sixth Man of the Year and All-ACC Honorable Mention by the coaches.

== Professional career ==
=== Aurora Jesi (2014–2015) ===
After going undrafted in the 2014 NBA draft, Miller joined the Detroit Pistons for the 2015 NBA Summer League, where he averaged 9.7 points and 3 assists per game.

On August 6, 2014, Miller started his professional career with the Italian team Aurora Jesi of the Serie A2, signing a one-year deal. On October 5, 2014, Miller recorded 43 points in his professional debut, shooting 10-of-15 from three-point range in a 74–82 loss to Brescia.

=== Auxilium CUS Torino (2015–2016) ===
On January 29, 2015, Miller parted with Jesi to join PMS Torino for the rest of the season. Miller won the 2015 Serie A2 Championship, earning a promotion to the Serie A.

On July 9, 2015, Miller signed a one-year contract extension with Torino.

=== Tenezis Verona (2016) ===
On March 17, 2016, Miller parted with Torino to join Tenezis Verona for the rest of the season. In 8 games played for Verona, he averaged 15.6 points, 3.3 rebounds, 2.1 assists and 1.2 steals per game.

=== Astana (2016–2017) ===
On August 3, 2016, Miller signed with the Kazakh team Astana for the 2016–17 season. On October 2, 2016, Miller recorded a season-high 32 points, along with 5 assists, 3 rebounds and 2 steals in an 83–78 win over Avtodor Saratov.

In 27 games played during the 2016–17 season, he averaged 14.7 points, 2.8 rebounds and 3.8 assists per game. Miller won the 2017 Kazakhstan League Championship and the 2017 Kazakhstan Cup titles with Astana, as well as reaching the 2017 VTB United League Quarterfinals, where they eventually lost to CSKA Moscow.

=== Uşak Sportif (2017–2018) ===
On June 17, 2017, Miller signed with the Turkish team Uşak Sportif. On October 28, 2017, Miller recorded a season-high 22 points, shooting 9-of-14 from the field, along with three assists and three steals in a 70-77 loss to Beşiktaş.

=== Gravelines (2018) ===
On March 27, 2018, Miller parted with Uşak to join the French team BCM Gravelines for the rest of the season.

=== Hapoel Gilboa Galil (2018–2019) ===
On July 13, 2018, Miller signed with Hapoel Gilboa Galil for the 2018–19 season. On October 27, 2018, Miller recorded a season-high 31 points, shooting 6-of-9 from three-point range, along with four rebounds and two assists in a 101–99 win over Hapoel Jerusalem. He was subsequently named Israeli League Round 4 MVP. In 29 games played for Gilboa Galil, he averaged 15.4 points, 2.3 rebounds and 2.6 assists per game, while shooting 41 percent from three-point range.

=== Chorale Roanne (2019–2020) ===
On July 27, 2019, Miller returned to France for a second stint, signing a one-year deal with Chorale Roanne.

=== Promitheas Patras (2020–2021) ===
On July 27, 2020, Miller signed with Promitheas Patras of the Greek Basket League.

=== Cholet Basket (2021) ===
On February 28, 2021, he signed with Cholet Basket of the French LNB Pro A.

=== Peristeri (2021) ===
On July 20, 2021, he signed with Peristeri of the Greek Basket League. On December 29, 2021, Miller mutually parted ways with the Greek club. He averaged 10.4 points, 2.4 assists and 1.3 rebounds per contest.

=== Büyükçekmece Basketbol (2021–2022) ===
On December 31, 2021, Miller signed with Büyükçekmece Basketbol of the Turkish Basketbol Süper Ligi.

=== Enisey (2022–2023) ===
On August 18, 2022, he signed with BC Enisey of the VTB United League.

=== Juventus Utena (2024) ===
On September 11, 2024, he signed with Juventus Utena of the Lithuanian Basketball League (LKL).

=== Khasyn Khuleguud (2024–present) ===
For the 2024–25 season, Miller joined Khasin Khuleguud (also known as Xac Broncos Ulaanbatar) from Mongolia and he won the championships, also became finals MVP. He led the Khasyn Khuleguud to the championships of Basketball Champions League East-Asia and became the MVP. He led the Broncos to a third place in the 2025 Basketball Champions League Asia; Miller was also named to the All-Star Five of the tournament.In 2026, Miller and Khasin Khuleguud won The league title again which was back-to-back champions for miller and 3-peat champions for Khasin Khuleguud.

== Honours ==
Promitheas Patras

- Greek Basketball Super Cup: 2020

Khasin Khuleguud

- Mongolian Basketball League / The League: 2024–25
- Basketball Champions League Asia third place: 2025
- Basketball Champions League Asia – East: 2025

Individual awards

- Basketball Champions League Asia All-Star Five: 2025
