= Basketball Champions League Asia – East =

Basketball qualification tournament

- Most recent season or competition: 2027 Basketball Champions League Asia – East
- Sport: Basketball
- Founded: 2024; 2 years ago
- First season: 2024
- No. of teams: 7
- Region: EABA and SEABA
- Continent: FIBA Asia (Asia)
- Most recent champion: (Hong Kong) South China (1st title)
- Most titles: (Mongolia) Ulaanbaatar Xac Broncos (Hong Kong) South China (1 each)

Basketball Champions League Asia – East (BCL Asia–East) is a qualification tournament for the Basketball Champions League Asia. It is participated by club teams from the East Asia (EABA) and Southeast Asia (SEABA) sub-zones of FIBA Asia.

== History ==
Basketball Champions League Asia, the tournament for club teams in FIBA Asia, was previously known as the FIBA Asia Champions Cup. It adopted its current branding in 2024. A non-branded qualification tournament (qualifying rounds) was held to determine additional two teams from East Asia and Southeast Asia to qualify for the inaugural 2024 tournament.

For the 2025 edition, the qualification tournament held on the same year was branded as Basketball Champions League Asia – East. On top of the two teams qualifying for the championship proper, the finals winner were crowned BCL Asia–East champions. This distinction went to the Ulaanbaatar Xac Broncos of Mongolia.

== Summary ==
BCL Asia Qualifiers

Year	Final round hosts	Qualifying teams	Other finalists	No. of teams
2024; Details	Indonesia	(Indonesia) Pelita Jaya and (Malaysia) NS Matrix Deers	(Indonesia) Prawira Bandung and Hong Kong Eastern	8

BCL Asia East

Year	Final round hosts	Final			Third and fourth place			No. of teams
Year	Final round hosts	Winners	Score	Second place	Third place	Score	Fourth place	No. of teams
2025; Details	Mongolia	(Mongolia) Ulaanbaatar Xac Broncos	86–77	(Chinese Taipei) Taoyuan Pauian Pilots	(Indonesia) Pelita Jaya	103–74	(Chinese Taipei) New Taipei Kings	8
2026; Details	Malaysia	(Hong Kong) South China	113–103	(Chinese Taipei) Taoyuan Pauian Pilots	(Mongolia) Chinggis Broncos	84–66	(Indonesia) Dewa United Banten	7

== See also ==
- FIBA West Asia Super League, which serves as the qualifiers for the same tournament for teams in West Asia.
