= Byron Wesley =

American basketball player

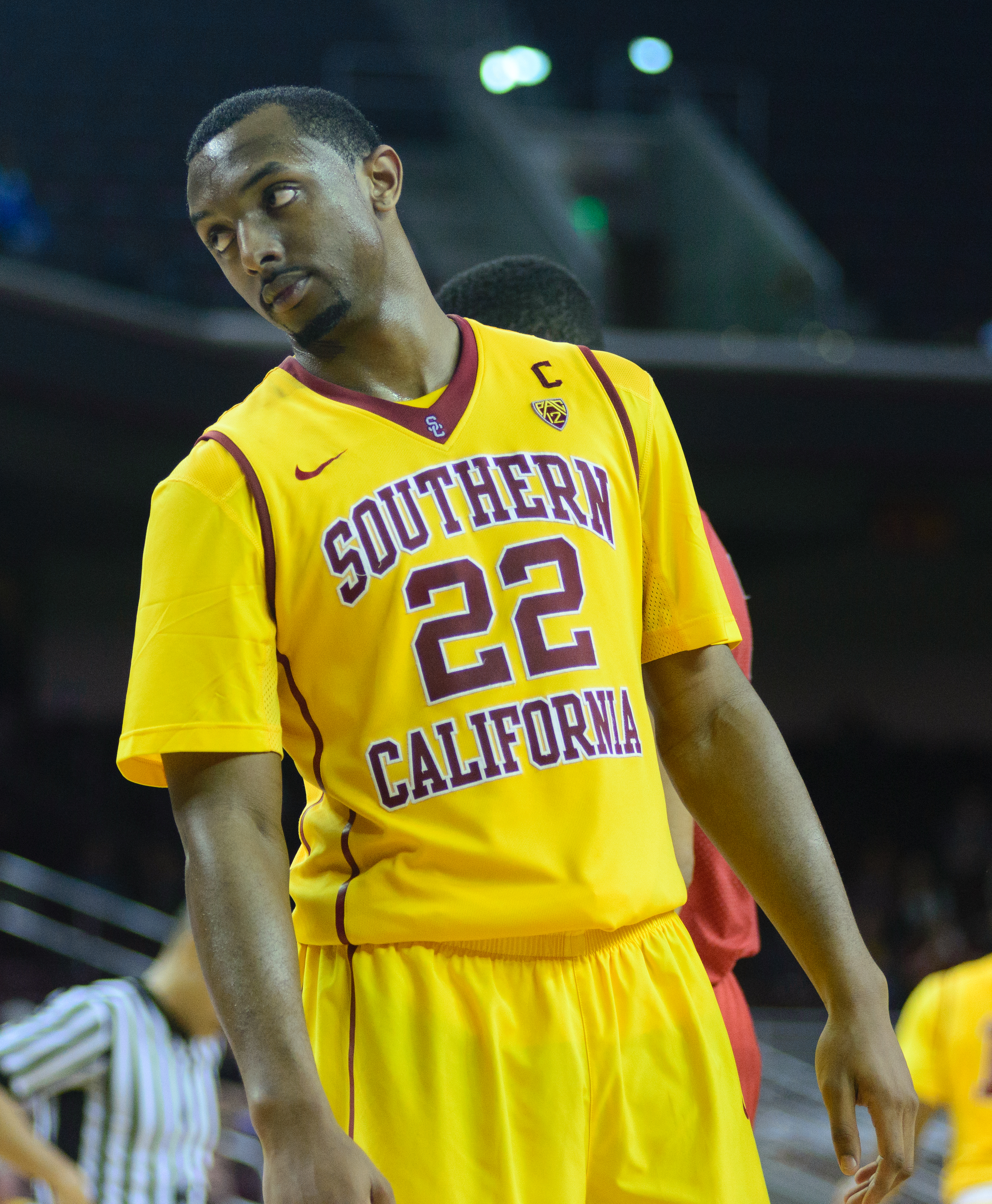
- Wesley playing for USC in February 2014

No. 25 – Bishrelt Metal
- Position: Shooting guard / small forward
- League: The League

Personal information
- Born: December 26, 1992 (age 33) Monterey, California, U.S.
- Listed height: 6 ft 7 in (2.01 m)
- Listed weight: 209 lb (95 kg)

Career information
- High school: Cajon (San Bernardino, California); Etiwanda (Rancho Cucamonga, California)
- College: USC (2011–2014); Gonzaga (2014–2015)
- NBA draft: 2015: undrafted
- Playing career: 2016–present

Career history
- 2016: Sioux Falls Skyforce
- 2016: Joensuun Kataja
- 2016–2017: MKS Dąbrowa Górnicza
- 2017: Lukoil Akademic
- 2017–2019: Hapoel Kfar Saba
- 2019–2020: KTP Basket
- 2021: Antibes Sharks
- 2021–2022: Dijlah
- 2022: Jaguares UAM
- 2022–2023: Al-Hashd
- 2023–2024: Al-Shorta
- 2024: Al Ahli Tripoli
- 2024: Nadim Souaid Academy
- 2024: Pioneros Del Avila
- 2024: Ermis Schimatari
- 2024–2025: Bishrelt Metal
- 2025-2026: Burenscore Mongolians
- 2026-present: Khan Falcons

Career highlights
- NBA D-League champion (2016); Second-team All-WCC (2015)

Byron Keith Wesley (born December 26, 1992) is an American professional basketball player for Bishrelt Metal of The League. He played college basketball for USC and Gonzaga.

== High school career ==
As a freshman, he played for his father at Rialto High School in Rialto, CA. As a sophomore, Wesley attended Cajon High School in San Bernardino, California where he played varsity basketball as a sophomore in 2008–09 for the Cowboys and coach Randy Murray. In 2009, Wesley transferred to Etiwanda High School and coach Dave Kleckner in Rancho Cucamonga, California. As a junior playing for the Eagles in 2009–10, he averaged 18.8 points per game, scoring 25 or more points 10 times in leading the team to narrow losses to Mater Dei in the CIF Southern Section 1-AA finals and to Long Beach Poly in the State Southern Regional quarter-finals.

As a senior at Etiwanda in 2010–11, Wesley averaged 19.2 points and was also named to the first-team Best in the West squad by the Long Beach Press-Telegram and was named Baseline Conference MVP for the second consecutive season. He led the Eagles to a 29–4 record, losing to Long Beach Poly in the round of 16 in the California State Championships.

== College career ==
Wesley played three years of college basketball for USC, graduating from the school following the 2013–14 season. As a junior in 2013–14, he averaged a team-high 17.8 points and 6.4 rebounds for a USC team that finished 11–21 overall and 2–16 in Pac-12 play. He subsequently took advantage of the NCAA's graduate transfer rule in which players are able to play their final year of eligibility immediately if they have graduated and want to pursue a degree that isn't offered at their current school. In May 2014, he transferred from USC to Gonzaga for the 2014–15 season.

In 2014–15 playing for the Gonzaga Bulldogs, Wesley appeared in 38 games (all starts) and averaged 10.6 points, 4.7 rebounds, 2.3 assists and 26.7 minutes while shooting 51.4 percent from the field. He subsequently earned second-team All-West Coast Conference honors in a season where Gonzaga turned in the best record (35–3) and longest winning streak (22) in program history en route to a top-five national ranking while also leading the nation in field goal percentage.

== Professional career ==
Wesley went undrafted in the 2015 NBA draft. On January 21, 2016, he was acquired by the Sioux Falls Skyforce of the NBA Development League. On January 30, he made his professional debut in a 110–100 loss to the Westchester Knicks, recording two points and one rebound in twelve minutes. He helped the Skyforce finish with a D-League-best 40–10 record in 2015–16, and went on to help the team win the league championship with a 2–1 Finals series win over the Los Angeles D-Fenders.

On August 28, 2016, Wesley signed with Joensuun Kataja of the Finnish Korisliiga, where he averaged 17.5 points in the Finnish League and 14 points in the Basketball Champions League. On December 4, he signed with MKS Dąbrowa Górnicza of the Polish League.

On October 5, 2017, Wesley signed a one-year deal with the Israeli team Hapoel Kfar Saba of the Israeli National League. In 29 games played during the 2017–18 season, he averaged 20.3 points, 7.3 rebounds and 3.5 assists per game.

On November 7, 2018, Wesley returned to Hapoel Kfar Saba for the 2018–19 season.

During summer of 2019, he has signed with KTP Basket of the Korisliiga.

On January 26, 2021, he has signed with Antibes Sharks of the LNB Pro B.

On November 7, 2022, Wesley signed with Al-Hashd of the Iraqi Basketball Premier League.

On January 19, 2024, Wesley signed with Al Ahli Tripoli for Dubai Tournament.

On May 3, 2024, Wesley signed with Pioneros Del Avila.

On September 21, 2024, Wesley signed with Ermis Schimatari of the Greek A2 Basket League.
