= Devon Scott (basketball) =

American basketball player (born 1994)

No. 23 – Diablos Rojos del México
- Position: Power forward / center
- League: LNBP

Personal information
- Born: April 7, 1994 (age 32) Columbus, Ohio, U.S.
- Listed height: 6 ft 9 in (2.06 m)
- Listed weight: 225 lb (102 kg)

Career information
- High school: Northland (Columbus, Ohio)
- College: Dayton (2012–2015); Philander Smith (2015–2016)
- NBA draft: 2016: undrafted
- Playing career: 2016–present

Career history
- 2016–2017: Wellington Basketball Club
- 2017–2018: CEB Puerto Montt
- 2018: Super City Rangers
- 2018: Ohio Bootleggers
- 2018–2019: Club Deportivo Hispano Americano
- 2019–2020: Minas Tênis Clube
- 2020: Hapoel Eilat
- 2020–2021: Ironi Nahariya
- 2021: Incheon Electroland Elephants
- 2021–2022: Basket Torino
- 2022: Indios de San Francisco de Macorís
- 2022: Fuerza Regia de Monterrey
- 2022: San Miguel Beermen
- 2023: Daegu KOGAS Pegasus
- 2024: Flamengo
- 2024–2025: Bishrelt Metal
- 2025: Ceisc União Corinthians
- 2026–present: Diablos Rojos del México

Career highlights
- All-NBB Team (2020)

Devon Henry Scott (born April 7, 1994) is an American basketball player for Ceisc União Corinthians of Novo Basquete Brasil (NBB). He is a 6 ft 9 in (206 m), 215 lb (98 kg) forward/center.

== Basketball career ==
In the Amateur Athletic Union, Scott played for the 17U All-Ohio Red team that won the 2011 AAU national championship. In 2014-15 he averaged 9.1 points and 7.4 rebounds per game.

Scott attended Northland High School ('12) in Columbus. As a junior, he averaged 11.5 points, 9.9 rebounds, and 2.3 blocked shots per game. As a senior, he averaged 17.2 points per game, and was named Division I Second Team All-Ohio and First Team All-District.

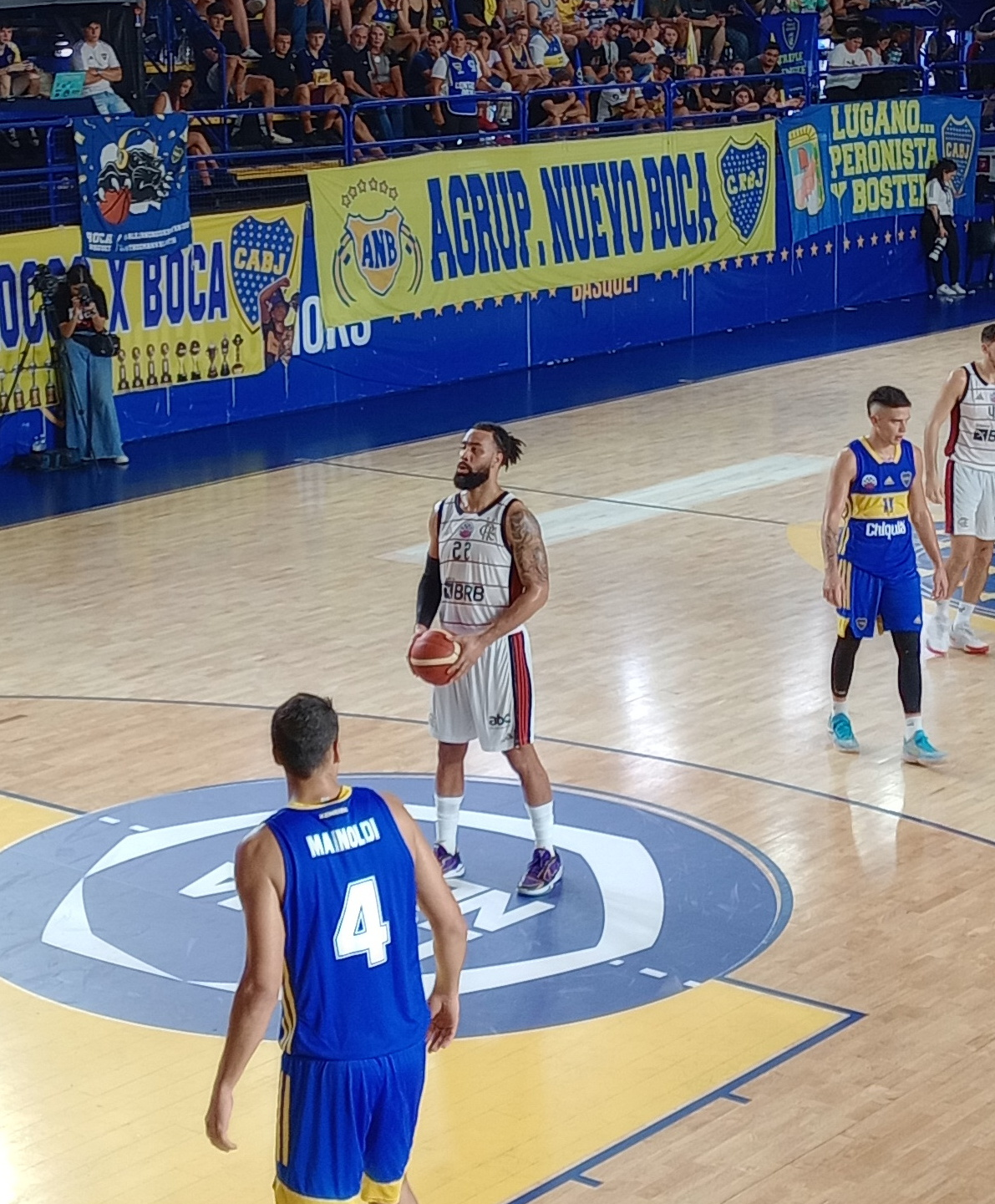
Scott playing with Flamengo in the 2023-24 BCLA

He attended the University of Dayton ('15), playing on its basketball team, the Dayton Flyers. In 2014-15 Scott averaged 9.1 points and 7.4 rebounds per game, and had a .636 field goal percentage. In August 2015, Scott was sentenced to 90 days in jail and five years probation after pleading guilty to several burglaries. He then attended and played basketball for Philander Smith College ('16).

Scott began his professional career with the Wellington Basketball Club of the Canadian Basketball League. On October 4, 2018, he signed with the Club Deportivo Hispano Americano of the Liga Nacional de Básquet Scott averaged 15.8 points, 8.4 rebounds and 2.9 assists per game. During the 2019–20 season, he played with Minas Tênis Clube of the Novo Basquete Brasil, and in 26 games averaged 14.3 points per game.

On May 20, 2020, Scott signed with Hapoel Eilat. On August 7, 2020, he signed with Ironi Nahariya of the Israel Basketball Premier League. In 2020-21 he was second in the Israel Basketball Premier League in two-point field goal percentage (72.3 per cent).

In October 2022, he signed with the San Miguel Beermen of the Philippine Basketball Association (PBA) to replace Diamond Stone as the team's import for the 2022–23 PBA Commissioner's Cup.

He signed with Bishrelt Metal team of The League (Mongolia) in 2024. But after altercation with opposing player in the first game of the Finals on April 21, 2025, The Mongolian Basketball Association suspended him from playing until the end of 2025.

== Personal life ==
Scott is from Columbus, Ohio. His parents are Sean Scott and Karen Smith.
