= 2023 PBA Governors' Cup =

Third conference of the 2022–23 PBA season

- Duration: January 22 – April 21, 2023
- TV partner(s): Local: One Sports; TV5; PBA Rush (HD); International: AksyonTV International iWantTFC (Note: Live on iWantTFC worldwide excluding Philippines and United States)

Finals
- Champions: TNT Tropang Giga
- Runners-up: Barangay Ginebra San Miguel

Awards
- Best Player: Christian Standhardinger (Barangay Ginebra San Miguel)
- Best Import: Rondae Hollis-Jefferson (TNT Tropang Giga)
- Finals MVP: Mikey Williams (TNT Tropang Giga)

PBA Governors' Cup chronology
- < 2021 2024 >

PBA conference chronology
- < 2022–23 Commissioner's 2023–24 Commissioner's >

The 2023 PBA Governors' Cup was the third and final conference of the 2022–23 PBA season of the Philippine Basketball Association (PBA). The 21st edition of the Governors' Cup started on January 22 and ended on April 21, 2023. The tournament allows teams to hire foreign players or imports with a height limit of 6 feet 6 inches (1.98 m). Sponsored by Japanese automotive company Honda, the conference is officially known as the 2023 Honda PBA Governors' Cup.

== Format ==
The following format will be observed for the duration of the conference:

- Single round-robin eliminations; 11 games per team; Teams are then seeded by basis on win–loss records.
- Top eight teams will advance to the quarterfinals. In case of tie, a playoff game will be held only for the #8 seed.
- Quarterfinals:
  - QF1: #1 vs #8 (#1 twice-to-beat)
  - QF2: #2 vs #7 (#2 twice-to-beat)
  - QF3: #3 vs #6 (#3 twice-to-beat)
  - QF4: #4 vs #5 (#4 twice-to-beat)
- Semifinals (best-of-5 series):
  - SF1: QF1 winner vs. QF4 winner
  - SF2: QF2 winner vs. QF3 winner
- Finals (best-of-7 series)
  - F1: SF1 winner vs SF2 winner

== Elimination round ==
=== Team standings ===
Pos	Team	W	L	PCT	GB	Qualification
1	TNT Tropang Giga	10	1	.909	—	Twice-to-beat in quarterfinals
2	San Miguel Beermen	9	2	.818	1	Twice-to-beat in quarterfinals
3	Barangay Ginebra San Miguel	8	3	.727	2	Twice-to-beat in quarterfinals
4	Meralco Bolts	7	4	.636 (Note: Head-to-head quotient: Meralco 1.099, Magnolia 1.0741, NLEX 0.86)	3	Twice-to-beat in quarterfinals
5	Magnolia Chicken Timplados Hotshots	7	4	.636	3	Twice-to-win in quarterfinals
6	NLEX Road Warriors	7	4	.636	3	Twice-to-win in quarterfinals
7	Converge FiberXers	6	5	.545	4	Twice-to-win in quarterfinals
8	Phoenix Super LPG Fuel Masters	4	7	.364	6	Twice-to-win in quarterfinals
9	NorthPort Batang Pier	3	8	.273	7	
10	Rain or Shine Elasto Painters	2	9	.182	8	
11	Terrafirma Dyip	2	9	.182	8	
12	Blackwater Bossing	1	10	.091	9	

Source: PBA.ph
Rules for classification: 1) winning percentage; 2) if two teams are tied, head-to-head record; if three or more teams are tied, head-to-head goal average (quotient); if tied for 8th, one-game playoff; 3) overall quotient; 4) coin toss

=== Schedule ===
Team ╲ Game	1	2	3	4	5	6	7	8	9	10	11
Barangay Ginebra	ROS	NLEX	NP	MAG	SMB	BWB	MER	PHX	CON	TER	TNT
Blackwater	NLEX	PHX	SMB	MER	TER	ROS	TNT	BGSM	CON	NP	MAG
Converge	NP	TER	MAG	ROS	TNT	SMB	NLEX	BWB	PHX	MER	BGSM
Magnolia	CON	TNT	SMB	PHX	BGSM	NLEX	ROS	MER	NP	TER	BWB
Meralco	ROS	NP	TER	BWB	SMB	TNT	NLEX	MAG	BGSM	CON	PHX
NLEX	BWB	NP	TNT	PHX	BGSM	MAG	CON	MER	ROS	TER	SMB
NorthPort	CON	MER	NLEX	PHX	BGSM	SMB	TER	BWB	MAG	ROS	TNT
Phoenix Super LPG	TNT	BWB	SMB	NP	NLEX	MAG	TER	CON	ROS	BGSM	MER
Rain or Shine	MER	TNT	CON	BGSM	BWB	TER	MAG	NLEX	PHX	NP	SMB
San Miguel	PHX	BWB	TER	MAG	MER	CON	NP	BGSM	TNT	NLEX	ROS
Terrafirma	CON	MER	SMB	BWB	TNT	ROS	PHX	NP	NLEX	MAG	BGSM
TNT	PHX	ROS	NLEX	MAG	CON	TER	BWB	MER	SMB	NP	BGSM

Source: PBA.ph
= Win; = OT win; = Loss; = OT loss

=== Results ===
Teams	BGSM	BWB	CON	MAG	MER	NLEX	NP	PHX	ROS	SMB	TER	TNT
Barangay Ginebra	—	119–93	120–101	88–118	112–107	114–111	115–100	109–89	116–108	99–102	109–104	105–114
Blackwater		—	90–98	95–110	99–125	102–124	104–110	108–105	117–122	86–105	106–119	116–138
Converge			—	111–109	129–132*	112–116	122–92	103–106	112–98	107–103	130–115	122–128
Magnolia				—	84–86	119–103	129–109	108–95	112–97	98–100	121–115*	85–93
Meralco					—	114–98	107–102	92–86	105–87	86–94	88–96	104–111
NLEX						—	121–112	98–94	110–99	106–120	142–125	110–108
NorthPort							—	97–108	113–97	132–145	115–100	110–134
Phoenix Super LPG								—	114–106	93–114	125–100	119–123
Rain or Shine									—	129–116	120–118	100–105
San Miguel										—	122–102	103–105
Terrafirma											—	109–131
TNT												—

Source: PBA.ph results, PBA.ph schedule
Legend: Blue = left column team win; Red = top row team win.
Matches with lighter background shading were decided after overtime.

== Bracket ==
Quarterfinals (Top 4 twice-to-beat)
1	TNT	132
8	Phoenix Super LPG	105
4	Meralco	113*
5	Magnolia	107
2	San Miguel	121
7	Converge	105
3	Barangay Ginebra	127
6	NLEX	93

Semifinals (Best-of-5)
1	TNT	3
4	Meralco	1
2	San Miguel	0
3	Barangay Ginebra	3

Finals (Best-of-7)
1	TNT	4
3	Barangay Ginebra	2

*Game went into overtime

== Quarterfinals ==
All match-ups had the higher-seeded team having the twice-to-beat advantage, where they had to be beaten twice, and their opponents just once, to advance.

=== (1) TNT vs. (8) Phoenix Super LPG ===
TV5

March 22
3:00 pm

Box score

TNT Tropang Giga 132, Phoenix Super LPG Fuel Masters 105
Scoring by quarter: 38–41, 28–23, 34–19, 32–22
Pts: Pogoy 25; Rebs: Hollis-Jefferson 12; Asts: Hollis-Jefferson 10	Pts: Maxwell 23; Rebs: Maxwell 10; Asts: Mocon 4
TNT wins series in one game

Araneta Coliseum, Quezon City
Referees: Jimmy Mariano, Mike Flordeliza, Janine Nicandro, Charlie Amparado

=== (2) San Miguel vs. (7) Converge ===
TV5

March 19
4:30 pm

Box score

San Miguel Beermen 121, Converge FiberXers 105
Scoring by quarter: 34–27, 23–31, 37–24, 27–23
Pts: Clark 40; Rebs: Clark 13; Asts: Perez, Ross 5	Pts: Vodanovich 39; Rebs: Vodanovich 10; Asts: Ahanmisi, Stockton 4
San Miguel wins series in one game

Araneta Coliseum, Quezon City
Referees: Sherwin Pineda, Bing Oliva, Joel Baldago, Jonathan Tangkion

=== (3) Barangay Ginebra vs. (6) NLEX ===
TV5

March 19
6:45 pm

Box score

Barangay Ginebra San Miguel 127, NLEX Road Warriors 93
Scoring by quarter: 18–17, 38–19, 37–26, 34–31
Pts: Brownlee 31; Rebs: Brownlee 13; Asts: Pinto, Thompson 7	Pts: Anthony 16; Rebs: Ganuelas-Rosser 10; Asts: Rosales 6
Barangay Ginebra wins series in one game

Araneta Coliseum, Quezon City
Referees: Nol Quilingen, Mike Flordeliza, Janine Nicandro, Kenny Hallig

=== (4) Meralco vs. (5) Magnolia ===
TV5

March 22
5:45 pm

Box score

Meralco Bolts 113, Magnolia Chicken Timplados Hotshots 107 (OT)
Scoring by quarter: 22–21, 25–28, 29–29, 20–18, Overtime: 17–11
Pts: Newsome 33; Rebs: Black 12; Asts: Newsome 7	Pts: Lee 22; Rebs: Hester 19; Asts: Abueva 4
Meralco wins series in one game

Araneta Coliseum, Quezon City
Referees: Nol Quilinguen, Sherwin Pineda, Mardy Montoya, Don Al de Dios

== Semifinals ==
All match-ups were best-of-five playoffs.

=== (1) TNT vs. (4) Meralco ===
TV5

March 24
5:45 pm

Box score

TNT Tropang Giga 110, Meralco Bolts 80
Scoring by quarter: 31–19, 26–26, 35–21, 18–14
Pts: Hollis-Jefferson 22; Rebs: Hollis-Jefferson 13; Asts: Hollis-Jefferson 12	Pts: McDaniels 12; Rebs: McDaniels 14; Asts: Black 5

Ynares Center, Antipolo
Referees: Peter Balao, Bing Oliva, Joel Baldago, Charlie Amparado

TV5

March 26
4:30 pm

Box score

TNT Tropang Giga 117, Meralco Bolts 124 (OT)
Scoring by quarter: 30–35, 19–24, 37–27, 26–26, Overtime: 5–12
Pts: M. Williams 29; Rebs: Hollis-Jefferson 15; Asts: Hollis-Jefferson 9	Pts: McDaniels 39; Rebs: McDaniels 20; Asts: Black 10

Ynares Center, Antipolo
Referees: Rommel Gruta, Mardy Montoya, Mike Flordeliza, Jonathan Tangkion

TV5

March 29
5:45 pm

Box score

TNT Tropang Giga 99, Meralco Bolts 80
Scoring by quarter: 30–15, 26–15, 19–29, 24–21
Pts: Hollis-Jefferson 40; Rebs: Hollis-Jefferson 13; Asts: three players 3	Pts: McDaniels 30; Rebs: Black 11; Asts: Newsome 5

Araneta Coliseum, Quezon City
Referees: Nol Quilinguen, Jerry Narandan, Albert Nubla, Kenny Hallig

TV5

March 31
5:45 pm

Box score

TNT Tropang Giga 107, Meralco Bolts 92
Scoring by quarter: 22–22, 31–27, 30–26, 24–17
Pts: Hollis-Jefferson 42; Rebs: Hollis-Jefferson 11; Asts: Pogoy 4	Pts: McDaniels 37; Rebs: McDaniels 12; Asts: Black 7
TNT wins series, 3–1

Araneta Coliseum, Quezon City
Referees: Sherwin Pineda, Rommel Gruta, Mardy Montoya, Erwin Traballo

=== (2) San Miguel vs. (3) Barangay Ginebra ===
TV5

March 24
3:00 pm

Box score

San Miguel Beermen 112, Barangay Ginebra San Miguel 121
Scoring by quarter: 22–25, 25–37, 33–33, 32–26
Pts: Clark 26; Rebs: Tautuaa 10; Asts: Enciso 6	Pts: Standhardinger 33; Rebs: Brownlee 12; Asts: Thompson 7

Ynares Center, Antipolo
Referees: Jimmy Mariano, Rommel Gruta, Jerry Narandan, Kenny Hallig

TV5

March 26
6:45 pm

Box score

San Miguel Beermen 103, Barangay Ginebra San Miguel 121
Scoring by quarter: 24–31, 21–32, 27–31, 31–27
Pts: Clark 23; Rebs: Clark 17; Asts: Ross 8	Pts: Brownlee, Standhardinger 32; Rebs: Thompson 11; Asts: Thompson 11

Ynares Center, Antipolo
Referees: Nol Quilinguen, Bing Oliva, Albert Nubla, Charlie Amparado

TV5

March 29
3:00 pm

Box score

San Miguel Beermen 85, Barangay Ginebra San Miguel 87
Scoring by quarter: 16–17, 34–21, 20–20, 15–29
Pts: Clark 16; Rebs: Clark 10; Asts: Enciso 5	Pts: Brownlee 22; Rebs: Standhardinger 17; Asts: Standhardinger 7
Barangay Ginebra wins series, 3–0

Araneta Coliseum, Quezon City
Referees: Peter Balao, Mardy Montoya, Janine Nicandro, Don Al de Dios

== Finals ==
TV5

April 9
6:00 pm

Box score

TNT Tropang Giga 90, Barangay Ginebra San Miguel 102

Araneta Coliseum, Quezon City

TV5

April 12
5:45 pm

Box score

TNT Tropang Giga 95, Barangay Ginebra San Miguel 82

Araneta Coliseum, Quezon City

TV5

April 14
5:45 pm

Box score

TNT Tropang Giga 103, Barangay Ginebra San Miguel 117

Araneta Coliseum, Quezon City

TV5

April 16
6:00 pm

Box score

TNT Tropang Giga 116, Barangay Ginebra San Miguel 104

Araneta Coliseum, Quezon City

TV5

April 19
5:45 pm

Box score

TNT Tropang Giga 104, Barangay Ginebra San Miguel 95

Araneta Coliseum, Quezon City

TV5

April 21
5:45 pm

Box score

TNT Tropang Giga 97, Barangay Ginebra San Miguel 93
TNT wins series, 4–2

Araneta Coliseum, Quezon City

== Imports ==
The following is the list of imports, which had played for their respective teams at least once, with the returning imports in italics. Highlighted are the imports who stayed with their respective teams for the whole conference.

Team	Name	Debuted	Last game	Record
Barangay Ginebra San Miguel	(United States) Justin Brownlee	February 5 (vs. Rain or Shine)	April 21 (vs. TNT)	14–7
Blackwater Bossing	(United States) Shawn Glover	January 25 (vs. NLEX)	March 8 (vs. Magnolia)	1–7
Blackwater Bossing	(United States) Troy Williams	February 9 (vs. Terrafirma)	February 15 (vs. TNT)	0–3
Converge FiberXers	(New Zealand) Ethan Rusbatch	January 22 (vs. NorthPort)		1–0
Converge FiberXers	(United States) Jamaal Franklin	January 26 (vs. Terrafirma)	March 5 (vs. Barangay Ginebra)	5–5
Converge FiberXers	(New Zealand) Tom Vodanovich	March 19 (vs. San Miguel)		0–1
Magnolia Chicken Timplados Hotshots	(United States) Erik McCree	January 29 (vs. Converge)	February 5 (vs. San Miguel)	0–3
Magnolia Chicken Timplados Hotshots	(United States) Antonio Hester	February 10 (vs. Phoenix)	March 22 (vs. Meralco)	7–2
Meralco Bolts	(United States) K. J. McDaniels	January 22 (vs. Rain or Shine)	March 31 (vs. TNT)	9–7
NLEX Road Warriors	(United States) Jonathon Simmons	January 25 (vs. Blackwater)	February 4 (vs. Phoenix)	4–0
NLEX Road Warriors	(United States) Wayne Selden Jr.	February 8 (vs. Barangay Ginebra)	March 15 (vs. San Miguel)	3–4
NLEX Road Warriors	No import	March 19 (vs. Barangay Ginebra)		0–1
NorthPort Batang Pier	(United States) Marcus Weathers	January 22 (vs. Converge)	February 2 (vs. Phoenix)	0–4
NorthPort Batang Pier	(United States) Kevin Murphy	February 10 (vs. Barangay Ginebra)	March 15 (vs. TNT)	3–4
Phoenix Super LPG Fuel Masters	(United States) Du'Vaughn Maxwell	January 25 (vs. TNT)	March 22 (vs. TNT)	4–8
Rain or Shine Elasto Painters	(United States) Michael Qualls	January 22 (vs. Meralco)	February 5 (vs. Barangay Ginebra)	0–4
Rain or Shine Elasto Painters	(United States) Greg Smith II	February 12 (vs. Blackwater)	February 25 (vs. NLEX)	1–2
Rain or Shine Elasto Painters	No import	February 16 (vs. Terrafirma), March 1 (vs. Phoenix), March 4 (vs. NorthPort), March 17 (vs. San Miguel)		1–3
San Miguel Beermen	(United States) Cameron Clark	January 29 (vs. Phoenix)	March 29 (vs. Barangay Ginebra)	10–5
Terrafirma Dyip	(United States) Jordan Williams	January 26 (vs. Converge)	March 8 (vs. Barangay Ginebra)	2–9
TNT Tropang Giga	(United States) Jalen Hudson	January 25 (vs. Phoenix)	February 11 (vs. Terrafirma)	5–1
TNT Tropang Giga	(United States) Rondae Hollis-Jefferson	February 15 (vs. Blackwater)	April 21 (vs. Barangay Ginebra)	13–3

== Awards ==
=== Players of the Week ===
Week	Player	Ref.
January 22–29	Maverick Ahanmisi (Converge FiberXers)	
February 1–5	CJ Perez (San Miguel Beermen)	
February 8–12	Mark Barroca (Magnolia Chicken Timplados Hotshots)	
February 15–19	Calvin Oftana (TNT Tropang Giga)	
February 22–26	Encho Serrano (Phoenix Super LPG Fuel Masters)	
March 1–5	Christian Standhardinger (Barangay Ginebra San Miguel)	
March 8 & 15–19	CJ Perez (San Miguel Beermen)	
March 22–26	Christian Standhardinger (Barangay Ginebra San Miguel)	

== Statistics ==
=== Individual statistical leaders ===
==== Local players ====
Category	Player	Team	Statistic
Points per game	Juami Tiongson	Terrafirma Dyip	23.3
Rebounds per game	June Mar Fajardo	San Miguel Beermen	12.8
Assists per game	Simon Enciso	San Miguel Beermen	7.7
Steals per game	Jio Jalalon	Magnolia Chicken Timplados Hotshots	2.5
Blocks per game	Brandon Ganuelas-Rosser	NLEX Road Warriors	2.1
Turnovers per game	Christian Standhardinger	Barangay Ginebra San Miguel	3.3
Fouls per game	Beau Belga	Rain or Shine Elasto Painters	4.4
Minutes per game	Christian Standhardinger	Barangay Ginebra San Miguel	37.1
FG%	Tyrus Hill	Blackwater Bossing	75.0%
FT%	Allein Maliksi	Meralco Bolts	94.6%
3FG%	Anjo Caram	Meralco Bolts	56.3%
Double-doubles	Christian Standhardinger	Barangay Ginebra San Miguel	13
Triple-doubles	Scottie Thompson	Barangay Ginebra San Miguel	2

==== Import players ====
Category	Player	Team	Statistic
Points per game	Kevin Murphy	NorthPort Batang Pier	36.7
Rebounds per game	K. J. McDaniels	Meralco Bolts	16.6
Assists per game	Justin Brownlee	Barangay Ginebra San Miguel	7.4
Steals per game	Jordan Williams	Terrafirma Dyip	2.5
Blocks per game	Du'Vaughn Maxwell	Phoenix Super LPG Fuel Masters	3.2
Turnovers per game	Jamaal Franklin	Converge FiberXers	5.2
Fouls per game	Wayne Selden Jr.	NLEX Road Warriors	3.7
Minutes per game	Wayne Selden Jr.	NLEX Road Warriors	44.6
FG%	Antonio Hester	Magnolia Chicken Timplados Hotshots	64.0%
FT%	Justin Brownlee	Barangay Ginebra San Miguel	91.7%
3FG%	Kevin Murphy	NorthPort Batang Pier	41.3%
Double-doubles	K. J. McDaniels	Meralco Bolts	16
Triple-doubles	Rondae Hollis-Jefferson	TNT Tropang Giga	3

=== Individual game highs ===
==== Local players ====
Category	Player	Team	Statistic
Points	Don Trollano	NLEX Road Warriors	44
Rebounds	June Mar Fajardo	San Miguel Beermen	18
Assists	Simon Enciso	San Miguel Beermen	13
Steals	Jio Jalalon	Magnolia Chicken Timplados Hotshots	6
Blocks	Brandon Ganuelas-Rosser	NLEX Road Warriors	5
Three point field goals	Don Trollano	NLEX Road Warriors	9
Three point field goals	Mikey Williams	TNT Tropang Giga	9

==== Import players ====
Category	Player	Team	Statistic
Points	Jordan Williams	Terrafirma Dyip	57
Points	Jamaal Franklin	Converge FiberXers	57
Rebounds	K. J. McDaniels	Meralco Bolts	23
Assists	Jamaal Franklin	Converge FiberXers	15
Steals	Wayne Selden Jr.	NLEX Road Warriors	8
Blocks	Du'Vaughn Maxwell	Phoenix Super LPG Fuel Masters	6
Three point field goals	Jamaal Franklin (twice)	Converge FiberXers	9

=== Team statistical leaders ===
Category	Team	Statistic
Points per game	TNT Tropang Giga	117.3
Rebounds per game	Magnolia Chicken Timplados Hotshots	49.2
Assists per game	Barangay Ginebra San Miguel	29.8
Steals per game	Terrafirma Dyip	8.5
Blocks per game	Phoenix Super LPG Fuel Masters	4.6
Blocks per game	Barangay Ginebra San Miguel	4.6
Turnovers per game	Converge FiberXers	18.6
Fouls per game	Converge FiberXers	28.5
FG%	Barangay Ginebra San Miguel	50.7%
FT%	Converge FiberXers	77.9%
3FG%	Barangay Ginebra San Miguel	39.0%
3FG%	TNT Tropang Giga	39.0%

== Final rankings ==
Pos	Team	Pld	W	L	Best finish
1	TNT Tropang Giga (C)	22	18	4	Champion
2	Barangay Ginebra San Miguel	21	14	7	Runner-up
3	San Miguel Beermen	15	10	5	Semifinalist
4	Meralco Bolts	16	9	7	Semifinalist
5	Magnolia Chicken Timplados Hotshots	12	7	5	Quarterfinalist
6	NLEX Road Warriors	12	7	5	Quarterfinalist
7	Converge FiberXers	12	6	6	Quarterfinalist
8	Phoenix Super LPG Fuel Masters	12	4	8	Quarterfinalist
9	NorthPort Batang Pier	11	3	8	Elimination round
10	Rain or Shine Elasto Painters	11	2	9	Elimination round
11	Terrafirma Dyip	11	2	9	Elimination round
12	Blackwater Bossing	11	1	10	Elimination round

Rules for classification: 1) finals result, 2) elimination round seed of semifinalists, 3) elimination round seed of quarterfinalists, 4) elimination round finish
(C) Champions
