= K. J. McDaniels =

American basketball player (born 1993)

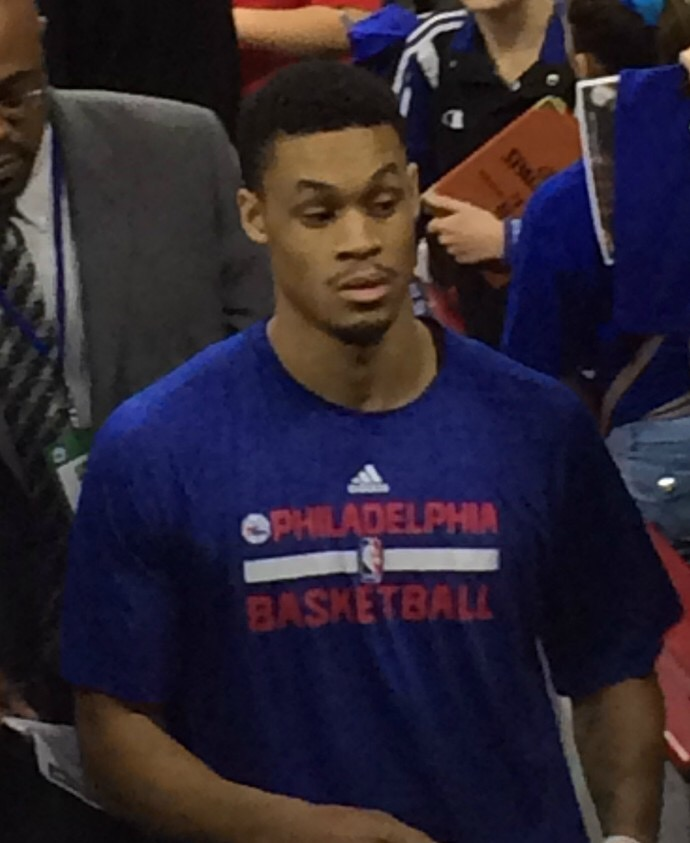
- McDaniels with the Philadelphia 76ers in 2014

No. 1 – Erdenet Miners
- Position: Small forward
- League: The League

Personal information
- Born: February 9, 1993 (age 33) Birmingham, Alabama, U.S.
- Listed height: 6 ft 6 in (1.98 m)
- Listed weight: 205 lb (93 kg)

Career information
- High school: Central Park Christian School (Birmingham, Alabama)
- College: Clemson (2011–2014)
- NBA draft: 2014: 2nd round, 32nd overall pick
- Drafted by: Philadelphia 76ers
- Playing career: 2014–present

Career history
- 2014–2015: Philadelphia 76ers
- 2015–2017: Houston Rockets
- 2015–2016: →Rio Grande Valley Vipers
- 2017: Brooklyn Nets
- 2017–2018: Grand Rapids Drive
- 2018–2019: Oklahoma City Blue
- 2019: TNT KaTropa
- 2020–2021: Greensboro Swarm
- 2021–2022: NLEX Road Warriors
- 2022–2023: Meralco Bolts
- 2023: Al Hilal
- 2023–2025: Pelita Jaya
- 2025–2026: Hangzhou Jingwei
- 2026: Erdenet Miners
- 2026: Marinos de Anzoátegui
- 2026–present: Erdenet Miners

Career highlights
- Venezuelan League champion (2026); IBL champion (2024); IBL Most Valuable Player (2025); All-IBL Defensive Team (2025); All-IBL Second Team (2024); 2x IBL All-Star (2024, 2025); ACC Defensive Player of the Year (2014); First-team All-ACC (2014)
- Stats at NBA.com
- Stats at Basketball Reference

Kevin Ornell Chapman McDaniels Jr. (born February 9, 1993) is an American professional basketball player for the Erdenet Miners of The League in Mongolia. He played college basketball for Clemson University before he was selected by the Philadelphia 76ers with the 32nd overall pick in the 2014 NBA draft.

== High school career ==
McDaniels attended Central Park Christian School in Birmingham, Alabama. Considered a three-star recruit by ESPN.com, McDaniels was listed as the No. 35 small forward in the nation in 2011.

== College career ==
McDaniels played limited minutes as a freshman for Clemson in 2011–12, averaging 3.9 points and 1.8 rebounds per game. As a sophomore, McDaniels became a starter for the Tigers. He averaged 10.9 points and 5.0 rebounds, and finished second in the Atlantic Coast Conference (ACC) in blocked shots with 2.1 per game.

As a junior in 2013–14, McDaniels became one of the top players in the ACC. He averaged 17.1 points and 7.1 rebounds per game. He led the ACC in blocks per game at 2.8 and at the conclusion of the regular season was named first team All-ACC and the conference Defensive Player of the Year. In the postseason, he led the Tigers to the 2014 National Invitation Tournament. McDaniels led the team to the tournament semifinals in Madison Square Garden.

In April 2014, McDaniels declared for the NBA draft, foregoing his final year of college eligibility.

== Professional career ==
=== Philadelphia 76ers (2014–2015) ===
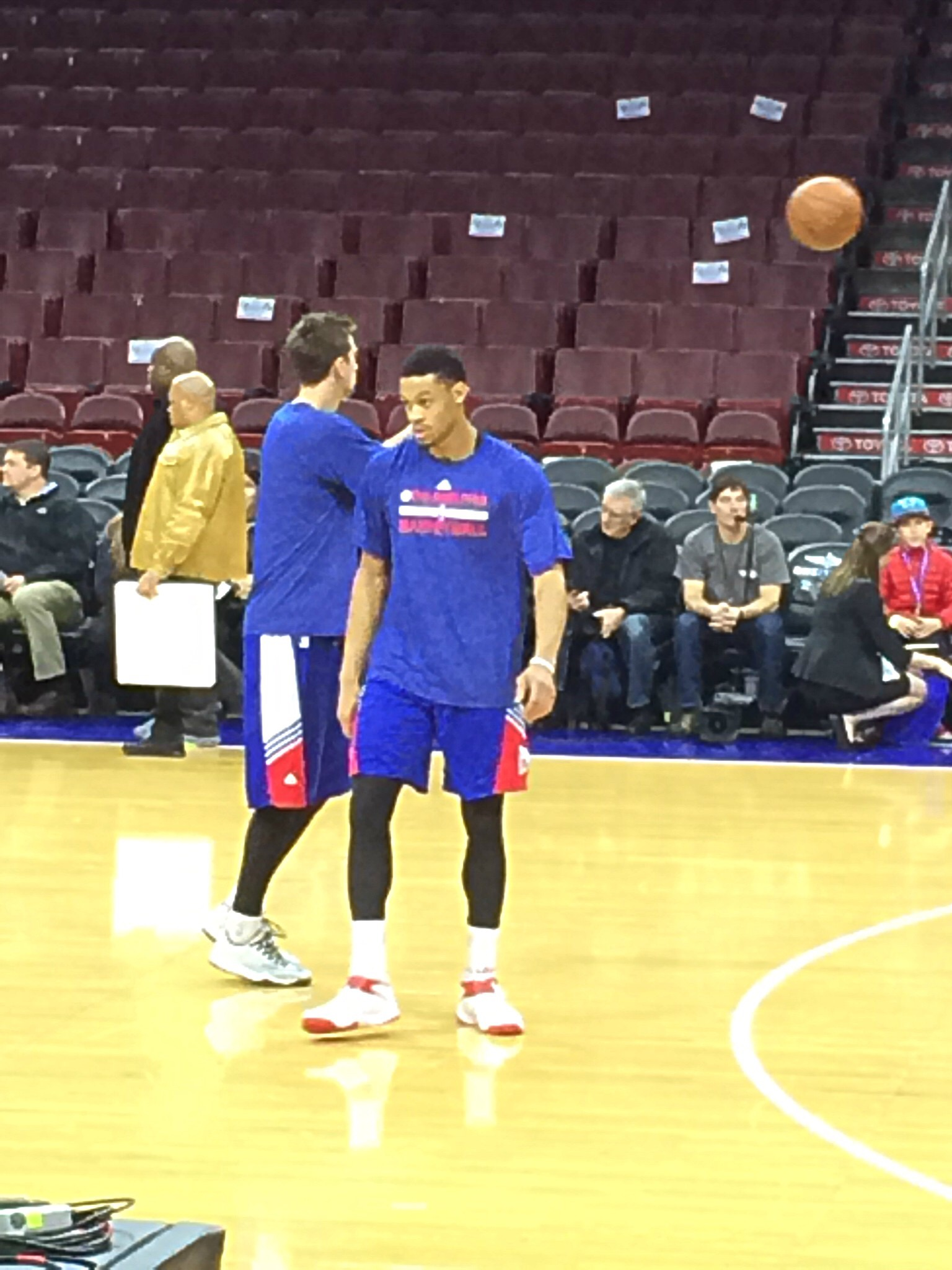
McDaniels warming up prior to a game in 2014

On June 26, 2014, McDaniels was selected by the Philadelphia 76ers with the 32nd overall pick in the 2014 NBA draft. In July 2014, he joined the 76ers for the 2014 NBA Summer League. After being named in the 76ers' 2014 training camp roster on September 29, 2014, McDaniels was not present at Richard Stockton College the next day for the opening day of training camp after he and his agent were not happy with the contract he was offered by the 76ers. Subsequently, his deal was restructured and on October 1, McDaniels agreed to a one-year, non-guaranteed tender worth $507,000, allowing him to become a restricted free agent in 2015. He went on to start his rookie season in fine form, becoming one of the 76ers main players off the bench and earned notoriety for his shot-blocking prowess. He recorded his first career double-double on November 29 with season-highs of 21 points (career high) and 13 rebounds in a loss to the Dallas Mavericks. McDaniels played 52 games for Philadelphia and averaged 9.2 points, 3.8 rebounds and 1.3 blocks in 25.4 minutes per game.

=== Houston Rockets (2015–2017) ===
On February 19, 2015, McDaniels was traded to the Houston Rockets in exchange for Isaiah Canaan and a 2015 second-round pick; he was one of a record 43 players to be traded on the day of the trade deadline. He appeared in just 10 games for Houston to finish the regular season, and missed the team's entire playoff run after suffering a non-displaced fracture in his right elbow in the regular season finale.

On July 21, 2015, McDaniels re-signed with the Rockets to a three-year, $10 million contract. On April 3, 2016, he played a season-high 18 minutes and scored 10 points in the Rockets' 118–110 win over the Oklahoma City Thunder. During the 2015–16 season, he received multiple assignments to the Rio Grande Valley Vipers, the Rockets' D-League affiliate.

=== Brooklyn Nets (2017) ===
On February 23, 2017, McDaniels was traded to the Brooklyn Nets in exchange for cash considerations. On March 23, 2017, he had a season-high 16 points in a 126–98 win over the Phoenix Suns.

=== Grand Rapids Drive (2017–2018) ===
On August 22, 2017, McDaniels signed with the Toronto Raptors. He was waived by the Raptors on October 22, 2017, before appearing in a game for them.

On December 13, 2017, McDaniels joined the Grand Rapids Drive of the NBA G League.

=== Oklahoma City Blue (2018–2019) ===
In July 2018, McDaniels played for the Portland Trail Blazers during the 2018 NBA Summer League and was named MVP of the championship game in Las Vegas.

On September 23, 2018, McDaniels signed with the Oklahoma City Thunder. On October 10, 2018, McDaniels was waived by the Thunder. McDaniels was added to the Oklahoma City Blue training camp roster on October 23, 2018.

In his first game with the OKC Blue, McDaniels recorded 10 points and 3 rebounds in 27 minutes of playing time as they got the win over the Stockton Kings, 124–89. On November 4, McDaniels recorded 21 points and 8 rebounds in a 128–118 win over the Agua Caliente Clippers.

=== TNT KaTropa (2019) ===
In August 2019, McDaniels signed with the TNT KaTropa as the team's import for the 2019 PBA Governors' Cup. In his Philippine Basketball Association (PBA) debut, he recorded a career-high 41 points and 22 rebounds as well as 7 assists and 5 blocks in a 135–107 win over the Blackwater Elite. Three days after, McDaniels recorded 37 points, 13 rebounds, 5 assists and 5 blocks in a 103–91 win over the Rain or Shine Elasto Painters.

=== Greensboro Swarm (2020–2021) ===
On February 22, 2020, the Greensboro Swarm acquired the returning right to McDaniels from the Oklahoma City Blue in exchange for the returning right to Zach Smith and a first-round pick in the 2020 NBA G League Draft. Six days later on February 28, 2020, the Greensboro Swarm announced that McDaniels was added to their roster. He rejoined the team for the 2020–21 season.

On July 18, 2021, McDaniels signed with Formosa Taishin Dreamers of the P. League+. On September 22, his contract was terminated due to his pregnant wife.

=== NLEX Road Warriors (2021–2022) ===
In November 2021, McDaniels signed with NLEX Road Warriors of the PBA.

=== Killer 3's (2022) ===
On May 25, 2022, McDaniels was drafted by the Killer 3's with the eighteenth overall pick of the 2022 BIG3 draft.

=== Meralco Bolts (2022–2023) ===
On October 31, 2022, McDaniels signed with the Meralco Bolts of the PBA to replace Johnny O'Bryant III as the team's import for the 2022–23 PBA Commissioner's Cup. In December 2022, he returned with the team as their import for the 2023 PBA Governors' Cup.

=== Pelita Jaya (2023–2025) ===
In December 2023, McDaniels signed with the Pelita Jaya of the Indonesian Basketball League (IBL). In December 2024, he returned to the Pelita Jaya for the 2025 IBL season.

=== Marinos de Anzoátegui (2026) ===
In April 2026, McDaniels signed with the Venezuelan team, Marinos de Anzoátegui, for their upcoming season. He led his team towards the finals. In Game 5, McDaniels recorded 16 points and 5 rebounds in a 82-65 series-clinching victory over Guaiqueríes de Margarita.

== NBA career statistics ==
Legend
GP	Games played	GS	Games started	MPG	Minutes per game
FG%	Field goal percentage	3P%	3-point field goal percentage	FT%	Free throw percentage
RPG	Rebounds per game	APG	Assists per game	SPG	Steals per game
BPG	Blocks per game	PPG	Points per game	**Bold**	Career high

=== Regular season ===
Year	Team	GP	GS	MPG	FG%	3P%	FT%	RPG	APG	SPG	BPG	PPG
2014–15	Philadelphia	**52**	**15**	**25.4**	.399	.293	.756	**3.8**	**1.3**	**.8**	**1.3**	**9.2**
2014–15	Houston	10	0	3.3	.333	.000	.500	.5	.2	.0	.2	1.1
2015–16	Houston	37	1	6.4	.403	.280	.800	1.1	.3	.2	.2	2.4
2016–17	Houston	29	0	7.3	.454	**.333**	**.900**	1.0	.1	.2	.3	2.8
2016–17	Brooklyn	20	0	14.7	**.455**	.282	.821	2.6	.5	.6	.5	6.3
Career		148	16	14.1	.412	.290	.776	2.2	.6	.5	.6	5.3

=== Playoffs ===
Year	Team	GP	GS	MPG	FG%	3P%	FT%	RPG	APG	SPG	BPG	PPG
2016	Houston	4	0	8.5	.308	.333	.000	1.8	.3	.0	.8	2.3
Career		4	0	8.5	.308	.333	.000	1.8	.3	.0	.8	2.3

== Personal life ==
McDaniels is the son of Kevin and Shawn McDaniels, and has a younger brother named Dylan. He was also a college major of Communication Studies.
