= Singapore Adroit =

- League: NBL
- Location: Singapore
- Team colours: Grey and Red
- Championships: 3 (2014, 2023 & 2024)

Adroit Sports Association, also known simply as Adroit or Singapore Adroit, is a semi-professional basketball team in Singapore. The team plays in the National Basketball League since 2013, and has won the championship in 2014, 2023 & 2024.

They won the 2023 title after defeating the Hornets in the final, and as such Adroit represented the country in the 2024 Basketball Champions League Asia qualifying rounds in April 2024.

== Honours ==
National Basketball League (Singapore)

- Champions (3): 2014, 2023, 2024
- Runners-up (2): 2018, 2022

== Roster ==
Adroit Club - 2024 BCL Asia qualifiers roster
Players
Coaches

Pos.	No.	Nat.	Name	Ht.	Wt.
-	1	(Singapore)	Yao Tor, Lok
G	5	(Singapore)	Long Wong, Wei	1.75 m (5 ft 9 in)
C	9	(Singapore)	Chan, Herman	1.90 m (6 ft 3 in)
G	10	(Singapore)	Han Wong, Zhong	1.83 m (6 ft 0 in)
G	11	(Singapore)	Hua Sen Liew, Larry	1.91 m (6 ft 3 in)
F	12	(Singapore)	Wu, Qinde
G	13	(Singapore)	Zhou, Zhenqiang	1.77 m (5 ft 10 in)
F	17	(Singapore)	Ng, Hanbin
-	55	(United States)	Moepo Kelly, Donald
C	99	(Singapore)	Borhan, Naqib	1.87 m (6 ft 2 in)

Head coach

- (Singapore) Chi Peng Pek

Legend

- (C) Team captain
- (I) Import player
- Injured

- Roster
Updated: 2024
