= SBL =

SBL may refer to:

- Society of Biblical Literature
- Spamhaus Block List of spamming IP addresses
- Stadium Builder License, a type of personal seat license
- Super Bowl L, or SB L, officially known as Super Bowl 50
- Supreme Beings of Leisure, an electronic/lounge band
- Svenskt biografiskt lexikon, the Dictionary of Swedish National Biography
- Sporadic bovine lymphosarcoma

== Sports leagues ==
- Slovak Basketball League
- Southland Bowling League, US women's college conference
- State Basketball League, former name of the west conference of NBL1 in Western Australia
- Super Basketball League, Taiwan
- Swiss Basketball League
