= Khasin Khuleguud =

Xac Broncos
- League: The League; East Asia Super League; Basketball Champions League Asia – East
- Founded: 2004
- History: Khasin Khuleguud (2004–present)
- Arena: M Bank Arena
- Location: Ulaanbaatar city, Mongolia
- Team colours: Red and navy
- Main sponsor: XacBank
- Head coach: Ariunbold Erdene
- Championships: 10 Mongolian League titles 2008, 2009, 2010, 2014, 2017, 2018, 2022, 2024, 2025, 2026; 1 Basketball Champions League Asia – East title (2025)

Khasiin Khuleguud (Mongolian: Хасын Хүлэгүүд; lit. 'Khas Broncos'), internationally known as South Gobi Broncos or as Xac Broncos for sponsorship reasons, are a Mongolian professional basketball team based in Ulaanbaatar. Founded in 2004, the team plays in The League, the country's premier level basketball league, and have won nine championships over its history.

== History ==
Xac Broncos was established in 2004 with the support of XacBank. They have been playing in The League since its inception. As of 2022, the team has also won seven Yanztai Upper League championships, most in the history of the league.

Broncos men's team won the championship of the 2023–24 season. Following the team's 4–1 win over Tenuun Olziy Metal in the Finals, Broncos' player Divine Myles was named the Final MVP. As result of the championship, the team entered the 2024 Basketball Champions League Asia qualifiers.

In 2024-2025 season, Broncos won their ninth title, second consecutive championship in the Mongolian league, earning the team qualification for 2025-26 East Asia Super League (EASL) in the process. This was despite the replacement of Zeljko Vasiljevic by Ariunbold Erdene as the head coach mid-season prior to the semifinals. They are the first Mongolian team to play in the EASL.

They also went on to win the 2025 Basketball Champions League Asia – East tournament with Ian Bennett Miller named as Most Valuable Player. Taking part as the Chinggis Broncos, the team failed to defend their title, settling for a bronze medal in the 2026 BCL–East.

== International tournaments ==
- 2024 Basketball Champions League Asia qualifying rounds
- 2025 Basketball Champions League Asia – East
- 2025 Basketball Champions League Asia
- 2025–26 East Asia Super League
- 2026 Basketball Champions League Asia – East
- 2026–27 East Asia Super League

== Honours ==
Mongolian Basketball League / The League

- Winners (10): 2007–08, 2008–09, 2009–10, 2013–14, 2016-17, 2017-18, 2021–22, 2023–24, 2024–25, 2025–26

Basketball Champions League Asia

- Third place: 2025

Basketball Champions League Asia – East

- Winners (1): 2025
- Third place: 2026

== Head coaches ==
- (Serbia) Zeljko Vasiljevic (2023–2025)
- (Serbia) Velibor Njegovanovic (2024 Basketball Champions League Asia qualifying rounds) (2024)
- (Mongolia) Ariunbold Erdene (2025)
- (Greece) Thanasis Skourtopoulos (2025–2026)
- (Mongolia) Ariunbold Erdene (2026)
- (Spain) Antonio Perez Cainzos (2026)
- (Mongolia) Ariunbold Erdene (2026–)
