= 2023–24 The League season =

The League
- League: The League (Mongolia)
- Sport: Basketball
- Duration: 13 November 2023 – 17 March 2024
- Number of teams: 13

Finals
- Champions: Khasin Khuleguud (1st title)
- Runners-up: Bishrelt Metal
- Finals MVP: Divine Myles (Khuleguud)

Seasons
- ← 2022–23 2024–25 →

The 2023–24 The League season was the 1st season of The League, the premier men's basketball league in Mongolia under its new name. The league was expanded from ten to thirteen teams. The season began on 13 November 2023 and ended 17 March 2024.

Khasin Khuleguud won their first national title after their 4–1 finals victory over Bishrelt Metal. Divine Myles was named Final MVP. Khuleguud and Metal qualified for the 2024 Basketball Champions League Asia qualifying rounds.

== Regular season ==
Pos	Team	Pld	W	L	PF	PA	PD	Pts	Qualification or relegation
1	Erdenet Miners	23	19	4	1878	1693	+185	42	Qualification to playoffs
2	Bishrelt Metal	23	18	5	1973	1767	+206	41	Qualification to playoffs
3	IHC Apes	24	19	5	2251	2012	+239	43	Qualification to playoffs
4	BCH Garid	23	17	6	2050	1815	+235	40	Qualification to playoffs
5	Khasin Khuleguud	22	14	8	1739	1673	+66	36	Qualification to playoffs
6	Nalaikh Bison	24	11	13	2099	2108	−9	35	Qualification to playoffs
7	Selenge Bodons	24	11	13	2056	2120	−64	35	Qualification to playoffs
8	Zavkhan Brothers	24	10	14	2039	2076	−37	34	Qualification to playoffs
9	Darkhan United	24	8	16	1927	2054	−127	32	
10	Ulaanbaatar TLG	24	7	17	2060	2168	−108	31	
11	Mongolians	24	7	17	1940	2115	−175	31	
12	Umnugovi Yoluud	23	6	17	1969	2216	−247	29	
13	Shutis Sharks	22	5	17	1862	2026	−164	27	

Source: Asia-basket.com
Rules for classification: 1) Win–loss record; 2) Head–to–head record; 3) Head–to–head point difference; 4) Point difference; 5) Points scored; 6) Sum of quotients of points scored (Note: Head–to–head record is used only after all the matches between the teams in question have been played)

== Playoffs ==
Quarterfinals
1	Miners	4
8	Brothers	3
4	BCH	3
5	Khuleguud	4
2	Metal	4
7	Selenge	0
3	Apes	4
6	Bison	1

Semifinals
1	Miners	1
5	Khuleguud	4
2	Metal	4
3	Apes	3

Finals
5	Khuleguud	4
2	Metal	1
