= Bishrelt Metal =

- League: The League
- History: Tenuun Ulzii Metal (–2023); Bishrelt Metal (2023–present)
- Location: Ulaanbaatar, Mongolia
- Team colours: Blue, white
- Main sponsor: Bishrelt Group
- Ownership: Tenuun Ulzii Metal Group

Bishrelt Metal (Mongolian: Бишрэлт Металл) is a Mongolian professional basketball team based in Ulaanbaatar. The team plays in The League since 2022, the premier domestic basketball league. The team, nicknamed "Metal", were runners-up in 2023 and 2024.

Formerly known as Tenuun Olziy Metal (Mongolian: Тэнүүн Өлзий Металл) after the owner Tenun Ulzii Metal Group, the team was re-named Bishrelt Metal in 2023, following an agreement with Bishrelt Group.

As runners-up of the 2023–24 season, Metal earned the right to play in the 2024 Basketball Champions League Asia qualifying rounds.

== Basketball Champions League Asia ==
Tournament	Position	Pld	W	L
(United Arab Emirates) 2024 Did not qualify	4th	3	1	2

== Basketball Champions League Asia - East ==
Tournament	Position	Pld	W	L
(Indonesia) did not qualify	4th	3	1	2 2024

== 2024 ==
3 April 2024
20:00

report

Prawira Bandung (Indonesia)	83–66	Bishrelt Metal (Mongolia)
Scoring by quarter: 21-16, 19-15, 18-12, 25-23
Pts: Antonio Hester 21; Rebs: James Gist 9 Asts: Yudha Saputera 7		Pts: Jeantal Cylla 23; Rebs: Uuganbayar Tumenbayar 9 Asts: Bolor Erdene Gantsolmon 5

UG Arena, Ulaanbaatar
Referees: Muongmee, Preeda (THA), Iwai, Haruga (JPN), Kozlov, Anton (KAZ)

4 April 2024
17:30

report

Bishrelt Metal (Mongolia)	84–98	NS Matrix Deers (Malaysia)
Scoring by quarter: 21-32, 16-18, 26-27, 21-21
Pts: Jeantal Cylla 20; Rebs: Jeantal Cylla 8 Asts: Daniel Ochefu 5		Pts: Jordan Tolbert 22; Rebs: Jordan Tolbert 11; Asts: Chun Hong Ting 8

UG Arena, Ulaanbaatar
Referees: Leong, Chuen Wing (SGP), Jontpa, Nattapong (THA), Cheon, Kamjae (KOR)

6 April 2024
17:30

report

Eastern Sports Club (basketball) (Hong Kong)	80–83	Bishrelt Metal (Mongolia)
Scoring by quarter: 21-18, 23-17, 19-25, 17-23
Pts: Chris Mclaughlin 22; Rebs: Chris Mclaughlin 12; Asts: Dominic Gilbert 10		Pts: Jeantal Cylla 26; Rebs: Enkhbayasgalan Amarbayasgalan 13; Asts: Uuganbayar Tumenbayar 6

UG Arena, Ulaanbaatar Mongolia
Referees: Stepanenko, Alexey (KAZ), Lee, Kyoung-hwan (KOR), Jontapa, Nattapong (THA)

== Head coaches ==
- (Serbia) Predrag Stojancev (2023–2024)
- (Mongolia) Tamjid Battuvshin (2024 Basketball Champions League Asia qualifying rounds) (2024)
- (Greece) Evangelos Tsepelis (2024–2025)
- (Canada) Jermaine Small (2025)
- (Mongolia) Gankhulug Batjargal (2025–2026)
- (Serbia) Sasa Matenicarski (2026–)

== Honours ==
The League (Mongolia)

- Runners-up (2): 2022–23, 2023–24, 2024–25

Sprite-A League

- Winners (1): 2019
