= Antonio Hester =

American basketball player (born 1990)

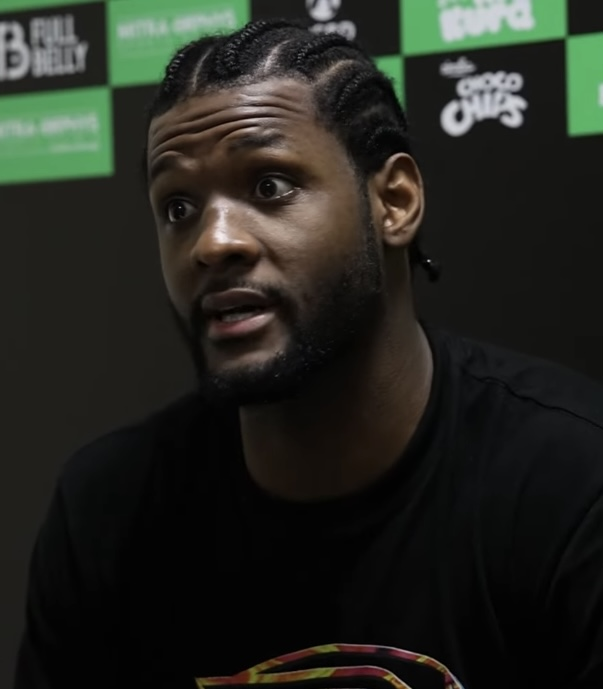
- Hester in 2024

Free agent
- Position: Power forward / center

Personal information
- Born: May 22, 1990 (age 36) Miami, Florida, U.S.
- Listed height: 6 ft 6 in (1.98 m)
- Listed weight: 198 lb (90 kg)

Career information
- High school: Miami Norland (Miami, Florida)
- College: Miami Dade (2009–2011); Mobile (2011–2012)
- Playing career: 2012–present

Career history
- 2012–2013: Turun NMKY
- 2013–2014: Atletico Nacional
- 2014: Real Club de Lima
- 2014–2015: CB Tarragona
- 2015–2016: Miami Midnites
- 2016–2018: Tindastóll
- 2018–2019: Starwings Basel
- 2019–2020: Bàsquet Girona
- 2020: Força Lleida
- 2020: Reales de La Vega
- 2021: Njarðvík
- 2021–2022: Terrafirma Dyip
- 2023: Zamboanga Valientes
- 2023: Magnolia Chicken Timplados Hotshots
- 2023: Nalaikh Bison
- 2024: Prawira Bandung
- 2024: Terrafirma Dyip
- 2026: Rajawali Medan
- 2026: Meralco Bolts

Career highlights
- Peruvian League champion (2014); Icelandic Basketball Cup (2018); Úrvalsdeild Foreign Player of the Year (2018); Úrvalsdeild rebounding leader (2021)

Antonio Kurtis Hester (born May 22, 1990) is an American professional basketball player who last played for the Meralco Bolts of the Philippine Basketball Association (PBA). In 2014, he won the Peruvian championship with Real Club de Lima and in 2018, he won the Icelandic Basketball Cup with Tindastóll. Listed at 198 cm, he primarily plays the power forward and center positions.

== College career ==
Hester was named NAIA Third-Team All-American in 2012 after averaging 15.5 points and 8.6 rebounds for the University of Mobile.

== Professional career ==
=== Early career ===
In 2012, Hester joined Turun NMKY of the Finnish First Division.

In 2014, Hester played for Real Club of Lima in the Liga de Basket de Lima, helping them win the Peruvian championship in July that year.

He played for CB Tarragona during the 2014–15 LEB Plata season, averaging 13.4 points and 7.6 rebounds. In September 2014, he helped the club to victory in the LEB Catalan basketball league and was named the finals MVP.

=== Tindastóll ===
In August 2016, Hester signed with Tindastóll of the Icelandic Úrvalsdeild karla. A month later, Tindastóll released Hester to sign Mamadou Samb. In November, Tindastóll brought Hester back as a part of a major roster overhaul where they fired head coach José Maria Costa and released Samb and Pape Seck. For the season he averaged 23.5 points and 10.7 rebounds in 32.0 minutes per game. Tindastóll finished third in the league but despite home court advantage, it lost to Keflavík in the first round of the playoffs.

In June 2017, Hester re-signed with Tindastóll for the 2017–2018 season. In November 2017, Hester injured his ankle badly and was initially thought to have broken it. Further tests revealed that the ankle was unbroken and that recovery time would be in weeks, not months.

On January 13, 2018, Hester helped Tindastóll to its first major title when it won the Icelandic Basketball Cup.

For the season, Hester averaged 20.6 points and 8.7 rebounds in 25.3 minutes per game, helping Tindastóll to a 16–6 record and the third seed in the playoffs.

In the playoffs, Tindastóll swept Grindavík, 3–0, in the first round, advancing to the semi-finals against ÍR. In the fifth game of the semi-finals on April 13, 2018, Hester injured his ankle. Despite the injury, Tindastóll prevailed in the game and advanced to the Úrvalsdeild finals. Although hobbled, Hester played in the first game of the finals series against four-time defending champions of KR. There he injured his other ankle after trying to block a shot from Brynjar Þór Björnsson, resulting in him missing game two of the series. Without him, Tindastóll staged a spirited performance, blowing out KR on their own homecourt, 98–70, and tying the series at one game apiece. After the season he was named the Úrvalsdeild Karla Foreign Player of the Year.

=== Starwings Basel and Bàsquet Girona ===
In December 2018, Hester signed with Starwings Basel of the Swiss Basketball League. In 14 games, he averaged 19.9 points and 9.6 rebounds per game.

Hester spent the 2019–2020 season with Bàsquet Girona in LEB Plata where he averaged 13.1 points and 8.3 rebounds in 25 games. On August 27, 2020, he signed with Força Lleida.

=== Return to Iceland ===
In January 2021, Hester returned to Iceland and signed with Njarðvík. For the season he averaged a team leading 18.4 points and league leading 12.0 rebounds per game. During the last game of the season, he had 30 points and 20 rebounds. He helped Njarðvík win its last three games, where he averaged 23.7 points 13.3 rebounds, staving off relegation but missing out on the playoffs on a tie-breaker with Tindastóll.

=== Philippines ===
In November 2021, Hester signed with Terrafirma Dyip of the Philippine Basketball Association.

In December 2022, he signed with Zamboanga Valientes of the ASEAN Basketball League.

In February 2023, Hester returns to the PBA as he signed with the Magnolia Chicken Timplados Hotshots to replace Erik McCree as the team's import for the 2023 PBA Governors' Cup.

In August 2024, he signed to Terrafirma for his 2nd stint with the team to replace injured Brandon Edwards as the team's import for the 2024 PBA Governors' Cup.

On July 15, 2026, Hester returns to the PBA for his 4th stint with the league he signed with the Meralco Bolts to replace injured Jordon Varnado as the team's import for the 2026 PBA Governors' Cup.

== Awards, titles and accomplishments ==
=== Individual awards ===
- NAIA Third-Team All-American: 2012
- LEB Catalan Finals MVP: 2014
- Úrvalsdeild Karla Foreign Player of the Year: 2018

=== Titles ===
- Peruvian League: 2014
- LEB Catalan basketball league: 2014
- Icelandic Basketball Cup: 2018
