= Malaysia Basketball Association =

Governing body for basketball in Malaysia

The Malaysia Basketball Association (abbreviated as MABA) is the national body for basketball in Malaysia. It consists of 16 affiliated members, including 13 state associations, Federal Territory, Malaysian Armed Forces and Royal Malaysia Police. MABA became a member of FIBA Asia in 1957. Its first elected president was Quek Kai Dong.
