= The League (Mongolia) =

Premier men's basketball league in Mongolia

- Current season, competition or edition: 2025–26 The League (Mongolia) season
- Sport: Basketball
- Founded: 1994
- CEO: Tugsjargal Sambuu
- Organizing body: Mongolian Basketball Association
- No. of teams: 10
- Country: Mongolia
- Confederation: FIBA Asia
- Most recent champion: Khasin Khuleguud (10th title) (2025–26)
- Most titles: Khasin Khuleguud (10 titles)
- International cups: Basketball Champions League Asia; East Asia Super League

The League (Mongolian: Үндэсний Дээд Лиг), also known as Mongolian Basketball League, is the top men's professional basketball league in Mongolia. The league is organized by the Mongolian Basketball Association (MBA) and consists of 10 teams.

Previously, the league was known as the Mongolian National Basketball Association (MNBA) and Mongolian Basketball League (MBL). The league had 10 teams from its founding until 2023 season when it was expanded to 13 teams. It returned to 10 teams in 2024.

The champions and runners-up of the league qualify for the Basketball Champions League Asia qualifying rounds. The champion also qualifies for the East Asia Super League since 2025.

== League names ==
- MBA (until 2013)
- Super League (2013-2017)
- Mongolian National Basketball Association (2017–2022)
- Mongolian Basketball League (2022–2023)
- The League (2023–present)

== Current teams ==
Team	Home
SG Apes	Ulaanbaatar
Khasin Khuleguud	Ulaanbaatar
BCH Knights	Ulaanbaatar
Selenge Bodons	Sükhbaatar
Erdenet Miners	Erdenet
Khovd Falcons	Khovd
Darkhan United	Darkhan
Zavkhan Brothers	Uliastai
BurenScore Mongolians	Ulaanbaatar
Bishrelt Metal	Ulaanbaatar

== Champions ==
Season	Champions	Runners-up	Score	Ref.
1994–95	1+11	Asian Wolf	4–2	
1995–96	Business Devlis	Altay Hawks	4–2	
1996–97	Business Devlis	Altay Hawks	4–1	
1997–98	1+11	Business Devlis	4–2	
1998–99	1+11	Business Devlis	4–2	
1999–00	Stallions	Sky Hawks	4–0	
2000–01	Leader	XMG Stallions	4–3	
2001–02	Leader	XMG Stallions	4–2	
2002–03	Khartsaga	Irves	4–1	
2003–04	Not played due to the Association changes			
2004–05	Leader	Khartsaga	4–1	
2005–06	Khartsaga	Baganat Urgoo	4–2	
2006–07	Khartsaga	Yoluud	4–1	
2007–08	Khasin Khuleguud	Sharks	4–3	
2008–09	Khasin Khuleguud	MBM MUIS	4–2	
2009-10	Khasin Khuleguud	Bayanzurkh Bulls	4–2	
2010-11	Khartsaga	Avatar	4–1	
2011-12	Bayanzurkh Bulls	Khasin Khuleguud	4–2	
2012-13	Tanan Garid	Khasin Khuleguud	4–1	
2013–14	Khasin Khuleguud	Hawks	4–0	
2014–15	Hawks	Tanan Garid	4–2	
2015–16	Alians Tekh Khartsaga	SBL Khasin Khuleguud	4–2	
2016–17	Arhangai Gold East Warriors	Alians Tekh Khartsaga	4–1	
2017–18	Arhangai Gold East Warriors	Khovd Altain Argali	4–2	
2018–19	Tanan Garid	Khasin Khuleguud	4–3	
2019–20	Not played due to the COVID-19 pandemic			
2020–21	Tanan Garid	Khasin Khuleguud	4–0	
2021–22	Khasin Khuleguud	Erdenet Miners	4-0	
2022–23	Erdenet Miners	Bishrelt Metal	4–0	
2023–24	Khasin Khuleguud	Bishrelt Metal	4–1	
2024–25	Khasin Khuleguud	Bishrelt Metal	4–2	
2025–26	Khasin Khuleguud	Selenge Bodons	4–1	

== Individual awards ==
Finals MVP winners
Season	Player	Team	Ref
2015–16	Carl Blair	Alians Tekh Khartsaga	
2016–17	Robert Turner	Arhangai Altan	
2022–23	Pendarvis Williams	Erdenet Miners	
2023–24	Divine Myles	Khasin Khuleguud	
2024–25	Ian Miller	Khasin Khuleguud	
2025–26	Azbayar Altangerel	Khasin Khuleguud	

== Regular season MVPs ==
Regular season MVP winners
Season	Player	Team	Ref
2016–17	Robert Turner	Arhangai Altan	
2021–22	Bilguun Battuvshin	Khasin Khuleguud	
2022–23	Sanchir Tungalag	Erdenet Miners	
2023–24	Ulzii-Orshikh Myagmarsuren	IHC Apes	
2024–25	Azbayar Altangerel	Khasin Khuleguud	
2025–26	Erdenetsogt Ochirbat	BCH Knights	
