= NS Matrix Deers =

- Nickname: The Deers
- League: Major Basketball League Malaysia
- Founded: 2015; 11 years ago
- History: NS Matrix (sometimes); NS Matrix Deers (2022–present)
- Arena: Karisma Arena
- Location: Seremban, Negeri Sembilan
- Team colors: Black, white
- President: Lee Yuen Fong
- Head coach: Felton Sealey
- Ownership: Matrix Holding Concept Bhd.
- Championships: 4 x Agong Cup (2016, 2017, 2018, 2019); 2 x Major Basketball League (2022, 2023)
- Website: www.nsmatrixbasketball.com
| Home | Away |

NS Matrix Deers, simply known as NS Matrix, are a Malaysian men's professional basketball club based in Seremban. Founded in 2015, the Deers currently play in the Major Basketball League Malaysia (MBL). They also played in the Basketball Champions League Asia and the ASEAN Basketball League.

== History ==
The Negeri Sembilan (NS) Matrix basketball team was established in 2015 and is owned by the Matrix Holding Concept Bhd. It was a frequent participant of the Agong Cup. With its roster having players from the Malaysian national team, they are a four-time Agong Cup champions. The club also has a women's team.

NS Matrix is among the six teams of the inaugural season of the Major Basketball League (MBL) of Malaysia in 2022.

They also joined the ASEAN Basketball League and made their debut in the 2023 season.

== Season by season ==
| Champions | Season champions | Runners-up | Playoff berth |

| Season | League | Regular season | | | | | Playoffs | Head coach |
| Season | League | Finish | Played | Wins | Losses | Win% | Playoffs | Head coach |
|---|---|---|---|---|---|---|---|---|
| 2019 | MPL | 4th | 10 | 6 | 4 | .600 | Won Semifinals (JD Unicorns) 2–0; Lost MPL Finals (Farmco Touch Up) 0–2 | - |
| 2022 | MBL | 2nd | 10 | 7 | 3 | .700 | Won Semifinals (Adroit) 2–0; Won MBL Finals (Southern Tigers) 2–0 | Jeff Viernes |
| 2023 | ABL | 3rd | 14 | 10 | 4 | .714 | Lost Semifinals (Eastern) 0–2 | Jeff Viernes |

== Roster ==
Roster for the 2025 Basketball Champions League Asia-East:

NS Matrix Deers roster
Players
Coaches

| Pos. | No. | Nat. | Name | Ht. | Wt. |
|---|---|---|---|---|---|
| F | 1 | (Malaysia) | Wong, John | 1.90 m (6 ft 3 in) |
| G | 3 | (United States) | Murry II, John Wesley | 1.96 m (6 ft 5 in) |
| G | 4 | (Malaysia) | Lee, Jayson | 1.77 m (5 ft 10 in) |
| F | 8 | (Malaysia) | De, Wee Yiang | 1.85 m (6 ft 1 in) |
| F | 11 | (Malaysia) | Wong, Yi Hou | 1.91 m (6 ft 3 in) |
| F | 12 | (United States) | Letcher, Marquez | 2.02 m (6 ft 8 in) |
| F | 17 | (Malaysia) | Lee, Jing Hung | 1.95 m (6 ft 5 in) |
| G | 22 | (Malaysia) | Tang, John | 1.86 m (6 ft 1 in) |
| C | 25 | (Nigeria) | Obasa, Toluwalope | 2.08 m (6 ft 10 in) |
| C | 35 | (Malaysia) | Chin, Jin Yen | 1.90 m (6 ft 3 in) |
| G | 71 | (Malaysia) | Ong, Wei Yong | 1.80 m (5 ft 11 in) |
| G | 77 | (Malaysia) | Heng, Yee Tong | 1.80 m (5 ft 11 in) |

Head coach

- (United States) Felton Sealey

Assistant coach(es)

- (Malaysia) Kuek Tian Yuan

Legend

- (C) Team captain
- (I) Import player
- Injured

- Roster
Updated: 20 April 2025

== Coaches ==
- (Australia) Brian Lester (–2020)
- (Philippines) Jeff Viernes (2022–2023)
- (United States) Felton Sealy (2023–present)

== Honours ==
- Malaysia Pro League/Agong Cup
  - Winners (4): 2016, 2017, 2018, 2019
- Major Basketball League
  - Winners (2): 2022,2023
- Tan See Seng Cup
  - Winners (1): 2023
