= 2022–23 Converge FiberXers season =

- Head coach: Jeffrey Cariaso (Philippine Cup); Aldin Ayo
- General manager: Dennis Pineda; Jacob Lao (assistant)
- Owner: Converge ICT

Philippine Cup results
- Record: 5–6 (45.5%)
- Place: 7th
- Playoff finish: Quarterfinalist (lost to TNT with twice-to-win disadvantage)

Commissioner's Cup results
- Record: 8–4 (66.7%)
- Place: 4th
- Playoff finish: Quarterfinalist (lost to San Miguel, 0–2)

Governors' Cup results
- Record: 6–5 (54.5%)
- Place: 7th
- Playoff finish: Quarterfinalist (lost to San Miguel with twice-to-win disadvantage)

Converge FiberXers seasons

The 2022–23 Converge FiberXers season was the 1st season of the franchise in the Philippine Basketball Association (PBA).

== Key dates ==
- May 15: The PBA season 47 draft was held at the Robinsons Place Manila in Manila.

== Draft picks ==
Round	Pick	Player	Position	Place of birth	College
1	3	Jeo Ambohot	C/F	Philippines	Letran
1	4	Justin Arana	C	Philippines	Arellano
2	15	Kameron Vales	G	USA	Regina
3	27	Jollo Go	G	Philippines	De La Salle

== Roster ==
2022–23 Converge FiberXers roster
Players
Coaches

Pos.	#	POB	Name	Height	Weight	DOB (YYYY–MM–DD)	From
F	1	(United States)	David Murrell	6 ft 4 in (1.93 m)	195 lb (88 kg)	1996–11–08	UP Diliman
F/C	2	(Philippines)	Abu Tratter	6 ft 5 in (1.96 m)	215 lb (98 kg)	1993–01–09	De La Salle
F/C	4	(Philippines)	Barkley Eboña	6 ft 6 in (1.98 m)	194 lb (88 kg)	1996–11–29	Far Eastern
F/C	5	(Philippines)	Bradwyn Guinto	6 ft 6 in (1.98 m)	220 lb (100 kg)	1991–10–20	San Sebastian
G	6	(Philippines)	Mike Tolomia	5 ft 11 in (1.80 m)	170 lb (77 kg)	1993–01–06	Far Eastern
G	7	(Philippines)	Jerrick Balanza	6 ft 1 in (1.85 m)	190 lb (86 kg)	1996–09–06	Letran
G/F	8	(Canada)	Taylor Browne	6 ft 3 in (1.91 m)	185 lb (84 kg)	1997–01–30	UBC
F/C	10	(Philippines)	Danny Ildefonso	6 ft 6 in (1.98 m)	230 lb (104 kg)	1976–12–09	National-U
G	11	(Philippines)	Aljun Melecio	5 ft 8 in (1.73 m)	160 lb (73 kg)	1998–07–25	De La Salle
G	12	(United States)	Alec Stockton	6 ft 2 in (1.88 m)	170 lb (77 kg)	1998–06–24	Far Eastern
G	13	(United States)	Maverick Ahanmisi	6 ft 2 in (1.88 m)	185 lb (84 kg)	1991–07–17	Minnesota
C	15	(Philippines)	Justin Arana (R)	6 ft 7 in (2.01 m)	231 lb (105 kg)	1999–03–21	Arellano
F	16	(Philippines)	Kevin Racal	6 ft 3 in (1.91 m)	175 lb (79 kg)	1991–05–16	Letran
F/C	18	(Philippines)	Jeo Ambohot (R)	6 ft 7 in (2.01 m)	193 lb (88 kg)	1996–11–18	Letran
G/F	21	(Philippines)	Jeron Teng (C)	6 ft 2 in (1.88 m)	185 lb (84 kg)	1994–03–21	De La Salle

Head coach

- (Philippines) Aldin Ayo

Assistant coach(es)

- (Philippines) McJour Luib (1st assistant)
- (Philippines) Franco Atienza
- (Philippines) Danny Ildefonso
- (Philippines) John Carlo Nuyles
- (Philippines) Karl Santos

Team manager

- (Philippines) Dennis Pineda
- (Philippines) Jacob Lao (assistant)

Legend

- (C) Team captain
- (CI) Commissioner's Cup Import
- (GI) Governors' Cup Import
- (EI) EASL Import
- (DP) Unsigned draft pick
- (FA) Free agent
- (IN) Inactive
- (S) Suspended
- (R) Rookie
- Injured

Roster

== Philippine Cup ==
=== Eliminations ===
==== Standings ====
Pos	Team	W	L	PCT	GB	Qualification
1	San Miguel Beermen	9	2	.818	—	Twice-to-beat in the quarterfinals
2	TNT Tropang Giga	8	3	.727 (Note: Head-to-head quotient:TNT 1.12, Magnolia 0.99, Barangay Ginebra 0.90)	1	Twice-to-beat in the quarterfinals
3	Magnolia Chicken Timplados Hotshots	8	3	.727	1	Best-of-three quarterfinals
4	Barangay Ginebra San Miguel	8	3	.727	1	Best-of-three quarterfinals
5	Meralco Bolts	7	4	.636	2	Best-of-three quarterfinals
6	NLEX Road Warriors	6	5	.545	3	Best-of-three quarterfinals
7	Converge FiberXers	5	6	.455 (Note: Head-to-head record: Converge 1–0 Blackwater)	4	Twice-to-win in the quarterfinals
8	Blackwater Bossing	5	6	.455	4	Twice-to-win in the quarterfinals
9	Rain or Shine Elasto Painters	4	7	.364	5	
10	NorthPort Batang Pier	3	8	.273 (Note: Head-to-head record: NorthPort 1–0 Phoenix)	6	
11	Phoenix Super LPG Fuel Masters	3	8	.273	6	
12	Terrafirma Dyip	0	11	.000	9	

Source: PBA.ph
Rules for classification: 1) winning percentage; 2) if two teams are tied, head-to-head record; if three or more teams are tied, head-to-head goal average (quotient); if tied for 8th, one-game playoff; 3) overall quotient; 4) coin toss

==== Game log ====
2022 PBA Philippine Cup game log
Total: 5–6
June: 2–4

Game	Date	Opponent	Score	High points	High rebounds	High assists	Location Attendance	Record
1	June 5	Rain or Shine	L 77–79	Jeron Teng (23)	Jeron Teng (13)	RK Ilagan (4)	Smart Araneta Coliseum; 8,241	0–1
2	June 10	Magnolia	W 89–82 (OT)	Jeron Teng (19)	Justin Arana (12)	Maverick Ahanmisi (6)	Ynares Center	1–1
3	June 12	TNT	L 83–86	Mike Tolomia (17)	Justin Arana (8)	Ahanmisi, Teng (4)	Ynares Center	1–2
4	June 16	Meralco	L 74–90	Taylor Browne (14)	Jeo Ambohot (11)	Alec Stockton (5)	Ynares Center	1–3
5	June 22	Terrafirma	W 97–84	Michael DiGregorio (19)	Justin Arana (12)	Maverick Ahanmisi (8)	SM Mall of Asia Arena	2–3
6	June 26	San Miguel	L 92–111	Allyn Bulanadi (22)	Justin Arana (6)	Maverick Ahanmisi (7)	Ynares Center	2–4

July: 3–2

Game	Date	Opponent	Score	High points	High rebounds	High assists	Location Attendance	Record
7	July 1	Barangay Ginebra	L 89–105	Allyn Bulanadi (16)	Adamos, Arana (8)	Alec Stockton (5)	Smart Araneta Coliseum	2–5
8	July 7	NLEX	W 112–108	David Murrell (21)	Tyrus Hill (7)	RK Ilagan (10)	Smart Araneta Coliseum	3–5
9	July 9	NorthPort	W 104–98	RK Ilagan (20)	Ahanmisi, Arana (10)	Maverick Ahanmisi (6)	Smart Araneta Coliseum	4–5
10	July 16	Phoenix Super LPG	L 66–89	Hill, Tratter (9)	Justin Arana (11)	Mike Tolomia (4)	SM Mall of Asia Arena	4–6
11	July 20	Blackwater	W 92–90	Maverick Ahanmisi (18)	Abu Tratter (10)	Maverick Ahanmisi (7)	Smart Araneta Coliseum	5–6

=== Playoffs ===
==== Bracket ====
Quarterfinals
(#1 twice-to-beat)
1	San Miguel	123
8	Blackwater	93
(Best-of-3)
4	Barangay Ginebra	1
5	Meralco	2
(#2 twice-to-beat)
2	TNT	116
7	Converge	95
(Best-of-3)
3	Magnolia	2
6	NLEX	1

Semifinals (Best-of-7)
1	San Miguel	4
5	Meralco	3
2	TNT	4
3	Magnolia	2

Finals (Best-of-7)
1	San Miguel	4
2	TNT	3

==== Game log ====
2022 PBA Philippine Cup playoffs game log
Total: 0–1
Quarterfinals: 0–1

Game	Date	Opponent	Score	High points	High rebounds	High assists	Location Attendance	Series
1	July 27	TNT	L 95–116	Tyrus Hill (18)	Abu Tratter (11)	Ilagan, Murrell (4)	Smart Araneta Coliseum	0–1

== Commissioner's Cup ==
=== Eliminations ===
==== Standings ====
Pos	Team	W	L	PCT	GB	Qualification
1	Bay Area Dragons (G)	10	2	.833 (Note: Head-to-head record: Bay Area 1–0 Magnolia)	—	Twice-to-beat in the quarterfinals
2	Magnolia Chicken Timplados Hotshots	10	2	.833	—	Twice-to-beat in the quarterfinals
3	Barangay Ginebra San Miguel	9	3	.750	1	Best-of-three quarterfinals
4	Converge FiberXers	8	4	.667	2	Best-of-three quarterfinals
5	San Miguel Beermen	7	5	.583	3	Best-of-three quarterfinals
6	NorthPort Batang Pier	6	6	.500 (Note: Head-to-head record: NorthPort 1–0 Phoenix)	4	Best-of-three quarterfinals
7	Phoenix Super LPG Fuel Masters	6	6	.500	4	Twice-to-win in the quarterfinals
8	Rain or Shine Elasto Painters	5	7	.417 (Note: Eighth seed playoff: Rain or Shine 110–100 NLEX)	5	Twice-to-win in the quarterfinals
9	NLEX Road Warriors	5	7	.417	5	
10	Meralco Bolts	4	8	.333 (Note: Head-to-head record: Meralco 1–0 TNT)	6	
11	TNT Tropang Giga	4	8	.333	6	
12	Blackwater Bossing	3	9	.250	7	
13	Terrafirma Dyip	1	11	.083	9	

Source: PBA.ph
Rules for classification: 1) winning percentage; 2) if two teams are tied, head-to-head record; if three or more teams are tied, head-to-head goal average (quotient); if tied for 8th, one-game playoff; 3) overall quotient; 4) coin toss
(G) Guests

==== Game log ====
2022–23 PBA Commissioner's Cup game log
Total: 8–4
September: 1–0

Game	Date	Opponent	Score	High points	High rebounds	High assists	Location Attendance	Record
1	September 23, 2022	Terrafirma	W 124–110	Quincy Miller (38)	Quincy Miller (16)	Maverick Ahanmisi (7)	PhilSports Arena	1–0

October: 4–2

Game	Date	Opponent	Score	High points	High rebounds	High assists	Location Attendance	Record
2	October 1, 2022	Magnolia	L 105–109	Quincy Miller (38)	Quincy Miller (16)	Maverick Ahanmisi (5)	Smart Araneta Coliseum	1–1
3	October 7, 2022	Bay Area	L 100–106	Quincy Miller (38)	Quincy Miller (14)	Kevin Racal (5)	Smart Araneta Coliseum	1–2
4	October 15, 2022	Meralco	W 106–99	Quincy Miller (29)	Quincy Miller (16)	Alec Stockton (6)	Smart Araneta Coliseum	2–2
5	October 21, 2022	San Miguel	W 106–102	Quincy Miller (24)	Quincy Miller (16)	Aljun Melecio (7)	PhilSports Arena	3–2
6	October 28, 2022	TNT	W 130–117	Quincy Miller (38)	Quincy Miller (20)	RK Ilagan (8)	Smart Araneta Coliseum	4–2
7	October 30, 2022	Blackwater	W 77–71	Quincy Miller (22)	Quincy Miller (19)	Ahanmisi, Ilagan (3)	Ynares Center	5–2

November: 3–2

Game	Date	Opponent	Score	High points	High rebounds	High assists	Location Attendance	Record
8	November 5, 2022	NLEX	W 108–84	Aljun Melecio (24)	Jeo Ambohot (12)	Ahanmisi, Melecio (6)	Ynares Center	6–2
9	November 9, 2022	Phoenix Super LPG	W 132–127	Quincy Miller (46)	Quincy Miller (18)	Quincy Miller (5)	Smart Araneta Coliseum	7–2
10	November 13, 2022	Rain or Shine	W 102–101	Jeron Teng (20)	Quincy Miller (20)	RK Ilagan (6)	Smart Araneta Coliseum	8–2
11	November 20, 2022	NorthPort	L 97–112	Aljun Melecio (20)	Teng, Tratter (7)	Aljun Melecio (8)	Smart Araneta Coliseum	8–3
12	November 30, 2022	Barangay Ginebra	L 96–115	Justin Arana (23)	Quincy Miller (16)	Aljun Melecio (4)	PhilSports Arena	8–4

=== Playoffs ===
==== Bracket ====
Quarterfinals
(#1 twice-to-beat)
1	Bay Area	126
8	Rain or Shine	96
(best-of-3)
4	Converge	0
5	San Miguel	2
(#2 twice-to-beat)
2	Magnolia	102
7	Phoenix Super LPG	95
(best-of-3)
3	Barangay Ginebra	2
6	NorthPort	0

Semifinals (Best-of-5)
1	Bay Area	3
5	San Miguel	1
2	Magnolia	1
3	Barangay Ginebra	3

Finals (Best-of-7)
1	Bay Area	3
3	Barangay Ginebra	4

==== Game log ====
2022–23 PBA Commissioner's Cup playoffs game log
Total: 0–2
Quarterfinals: 0–2

Game	Date	Opponent	Score	High points	High rebounds	High assists	Location Attendance	Series
1	December 7, 2022	San Miguel	L 96–114	Quincy Miller (41)	Quincy Miller (13)	Ilagan, Melecio (4)	PhilSports Arena	0–1
2	December 10, 2022	San Miguel	L 107–120	Jeron Teng (25)	Jeron Teng (10)	Alec Stockton (5)	PhilSports Arena	0–2

== Governors' Cup ==
=== Eliminations ===
==== Standings ====
Pos	Team	W	L	PCT	GB	Qualification
1	TNT Tropang Giga	10	1	.909	—	Twice-to-beat in quarterfinals
2	San Miguel Beermen	9	2	.818	1	Twice-to-beat in quarterfinals
3	Barangay Ginebra San Miguel	8	3	.727	2	Twice-to-beat in quarterfinals
4	Meralco Bolts	7	4	.636 (Note: Head-to-head quotient: Meralco 1.10, Magnolia 1.07, NLEX 0.86)	3	Twice-to-beat in quarterfinals
5	Magnolia Chicken Timplados Hotshots	7	4	.636	3	Twice-to-win in quarterfinals
6	NLEX Road Warriors	7	4	.636	3	Twice-to-win in quarterfinals
7	Converge FiberXers	6	5	.545	4	Twice-to-win in quarterfinals
8	Phoenix Super LPG Fuel Masters	4	7	.364	6	Twice-to-win in quarterfinals
9	NorthPort Batang Pier	3	8	.273	7	
10	Rain or Shine Elasto Painters	2	9	.182 (Note: Head-to-head record: Rain or Shine 1–0 Terrafirma)	8	
11	Terrafirma Dyip	2	9	.182	8	
12	Blackwater Bossing	1	10	.091	9	

Source: PBA.ph
Rules for classification: 1) winning percentage; 2) if two teams are tied, head-to-head record; if three or more teams are tied, head-to-head goal average (quotient); if tied for 8th, one-game playoff; 3) overall quotient; 4) coin toss

==== Game log ====
2023 PBA Governors' Cup game log
Total: 6–5
January: 3–0

Game	Date	Opponent	Score	High points	High rebounds	High assists	Location Attendance	Record
1	January 22	NorthPort	W 122–92	Maverick Ahanmisi (29)	Rusbatch, Teng (9)	Maverick Ahanmisi (9)	PhilSports Arena	1–0
2	January 26	Terrafirma	W 130–115	Jamaal Franklin (42)	Jamaal Franklin (11)	Jamaal Franklin (8)	PhilSports Arena	2–0
3	January 29	Magnolia	W 111–109	Jamaal Franklin (26)	Jamaal Franklin (13)	Jamaal Franklin (7)	Ynares Center	3–0

February: 3–3

Game	Date	Opponent	Score	High points	High rebounds	High assists	Location Attendance	Record
4	February 2	Rain or Shine	W 112–98	Jamaal Franklin (25)	Jamaal Franklin (13)	Jamaal Franklin (15)	PhilSports Arena	4–0
5	February 8	TNT	L 122–128	Jamaal Franklin (47)	Jamaal Franklin (14)	Jamaal Franklin (7)	Smart Araneta Coliseum	4–1
6	February 11	San Miguel	W 107–103	Jamaal Franklin (37)	Eboña, Franklin (9)	Jamaal Franklin (7)	SM Mall of Asia Arena	5–1
7	February 18	NLEX	L 112–116	Jamaal Franklin (53)	Jamaal Franklin (11)	Jamaal Franklin (4)	Smart Araneta Coliseum	5–2
8	February 23	Blackwater	W 98–90	Maverick Ahanmisi (31)	Jamaal Franklin (15)	Jamaal Franklin (5)	PhilSports Arena	6–2
9	February 26	Phoenix Super LPG	L 103–106	Jamaal Franklin (30)	Jamaal Franklin (12)	Jamaal Franklin (7)	Smart Araneta Coliseum	6–3

March: 0–2

Game	Date	Opponent	Score	High points	High rebounds	High assists	Location Attendance	Record
10	March 3	Meralco	L 129–132 (OT)	Jamaal Franklin (57)	Jamaal Franklin (14)	Jamaal Franklin (11)	Smart Araneta Coliseum	6–4
11	March 5	Barangay Ginebra	L 101–120	Maverick Ahanmisi (24)	Maverick Ahanmisi (8)	Jamaal Franklin (5)	PhilSports Arena	6–5

=== Playoffs ===
==== Bracket ====
Quarterfinals (Top 4 twice-to-beat)
1	TNT	132
8	Phoenix Super LPG	105
4	Meralco	113*
5	Magnolia	107
2	San Miguel	121
7	Converge	105
3	Barangay Ginebra	127
6	NLEX	93

Semifinals (Best-of-5)
1	TNT	3
4	Meralco	1
2	San Miguel	0
3	Barangay Ginebra	3

Finals (Best-of-7)
1	TNT	4
3	Barangay Ginebra	2

*Game went into overtime

==== Game log ====
2023 PBA Governors' Cup playoffs game log
Total: 0–1
Quarterfinals: 0–1

Game	Date	Opponent	Score	High points	High rebounds	High assists	Location Attendance	Series
1	March 19	San Miguel	L 105–121	Tom Vodanovich (39)	Tom Vodanovich (10)	Ahanmisi, Stockton (4)	Smart Araneta Coliseum	0–1

== Transactions ==
=== Free agency ===
==== Signings ====
Player	Date signed	Contract amount	Contract length	Former team
Allyn Bulanadi	April 27, 2022	Not disclosed	2 years	Alaska Aces
Kevin Racal	April 27, 2022	Not disclosed	1 year	Alaska Aces
Alec Stockton	May 2, 2022	Not disclosed	2 years	Alaska Aces
RK Ilagan	May 2, 2022	Not disclosed	1 year	Alaska Aces
Michael DiGregorio	May 12, 2022	Not disclosed	2 years	Alaska Aces
Mike Tolomia	May 12, 2022	Not disclosed	Not disclosed	Alaska Aces
Robbie Herndon	June 6, 2022	Not disclosed	1 year	Alaska Aces
Maverick Ahanmisi	June 6, 2022	Not disclosed	Not disclosed	Alaska Aces
Abu Tratter	June 15, 2022	Not disclosed	Not disclosed	Alaska Aces
David Murrell	September 20, 2022	Not disclosed	2 years	Re-signed
Bradwyn Guinto	January 27, 2023	Not disclosed	2 conferences	Rain or Shine Elasto Painters
Danny Ildefonso	March 2, 2023	Not disclosed	Not disclosed	Retired (last played for the Meralco Bolts in 2015)

=== Trades ===
==== Pre-season ====
May
May 17, 2022	To Converge Tyrus Hill; David Murrell	To NLEX 2023 Converge first-round pick
May 21, 2022	To Converge Kurt Lojera	To Blackwater Yousef Taha

==== Philippine Cup ====
June
June 6, 2022	To Converge 2023 San Miguel second-round pick 2024 San Miguel second-round pick	To San Miguel Robbie Herndon

==== Mid-season ====
September
September 9, 2022	To Converge Aljun Melecio; Kris Porter	To Phoenix Ben Adamos; Kurt Lojera

==== Commissioner's Cup ====
January
January 3, 2023	To Converge Barkley Eboña; 2022 TNT first-round pick	To Blackwater Michael DiGregorio; Tyrus Hill; RK Ilagan
January 4, 2023	To Converge Jerrick Balanza	To NorthPort Allyn Bulanadi

=== Recruited imports ===
Tournament	Name	Debuted	Last game	Record
Commissioner's Cup	Quincy Miller	September 23, 2022 (vs. Terrafirma)	December 10, 2022 (vs. San Miguel)	8–5
Governors' Cup	Ethan Rusbatch	January 22, 2023 (vs. NorthPort)		1–0
Governors' Cup	Jamaal Franklin	January 26, 2023 (vs. Terrafirma)	March 5, 2023 (vs. Barangay Ginebra)	5–5
Governors' Cup	Tom Vodanovich	March 19, 2023 (vs. San Miguel)		0–1

== Awards ==
Recipient	Honors	Date awarded
Maverick Ahanmisi	2022–23 PBA Most Improved Player	November 5, 2023
Justin Arana	2022–23 PBA Rookie of the Year	November 5, 2023
Justin Arana	2022–23 All-Rookie Team	November 19, 2023
