= 2022–23 NorthPort Batang Pier season =

- Head coach: Pido Jarencio (Philippine and Commissioner's Cup); Bonnie Tan (interim)
- Owners: Sultan 900 Capital, Inc.

Philippine Cup results
- Record: 3–8 (27.3%)
- Place: 10th
- Playoff finish: Did not qualify

Commissioner's Cup results
- Record: 6–6 (50%)
- Place: 6th
- Playoff finish: Quarterfinalist (lost to Barangay Ginebra, 0–2)

Governors' Cup results
- Record: 3–8 (27.3%)
- Place: 9th
- Playoff finish: Did not qualify

NorthPort Batang Pier seasons

The 2022–23 NorthPort Batang Pier season was the 10th season of the franchise in the Philippine Basketball Association (PBA).

== Key dates ==
- May 15: The PBA season 47 draft was held at the Robinsons Place Manila in Manila.

== Draft picks ==
Round	Pick	Player	Position	Place of birth	College
1	6	JM Calma	C	Philippines	San Sebastian
3	30	John Apacible	F	Philippines	UE
4	40	JJ Caspe	G	Philippines	Batangas
5	48	Yves Sazon	G	Philippines	PCU

== Roster ==
2022–23 NorthPort Batang Pier roster
Players
Coaches

Pos.	#	POB	Name	Height	Weight	DOB (YYYY–MM–DD)	From
G/F	0	(Philippines)	Paolo Taha	6 ft 0 in (1.83 m)	180 lb (82 kg)	1990–12–05	St. Benilde
C	2	(Philippines)	JM Calma (R)	6 ft 6 in (1.98 m)	193 lb (88 kg)	1997–12–02	San Sebastian
G	3	(Philippines)	Louie Vigil	6 ft 3 in (1.91 m)	200 lb (91 kg)	1991–09–26	UST
G	5	(Philippines)	Paul Zamar	5 ft 10 in (1.78 m)	179 lb (81 kg)	1987–10–20	UE
G	6	(Philippines)	Roi Sumang	5 ft 8 in (1.73 m)	160 lb (73 kg)	1990–12–12	UE
G	8	(Philippines)	Robert Bolick	6 ft 1 in (1.85 m)	178 lb (81 kg)	1995–09–13	San Beda
F	10	(Philippines)	Arvin Tolentino	6 ft 5 in (1.96 m)	210 lb (95 kg)	1995–11–05	Far Eastern
F/C	12	(Philippines)	Prince Caperal	6 ft 7 in (2.01 m)	230 lb (104 kg)	1993–06–12	Arellano
G/F	16	(Philippines)	Jeff Chan	6 ft 2 in (1.88 m)	185 lb (84 kg)	1983–02–11	Far Eastern
F	18	(Philippines)	Arthur dela Cruz	6 ft 4 in (1.93 m)	210 lb (95 kg)	1992–05–09	San Beda
F	23	(Greece)	William Navarro (R)	6 ft 6 in (1.98 m)	185 lb (84 kg)	1997–02–03	Ateneo
G/F	24	(United States)	Joshua Munzon	6 ft 4 in (1.93 m)	200 lb (91 kg)	1995–01–15	Cal State LA
G/F	25	(Philippines)	MJ Ayaay	6 ft 1 in (1.85 m)		1993–08–03	Lyceum
C	28	(Philippines)	Christian Balagasay	6 ft 5 in (1.96 m)		1996–10–28	Letran
F	29	(Philippines)	Arwind Santos (C)	6 ft 4 in (1.93 m)	175 lb (79 kg)	1981–06–10	Far Eastern
G	30	(Philippines)	Kent Salado	5 ft 9 in (1.75 m)		1994–11–10	Arellano

Head coach

- (Philippines) Bonnie Tan (interim)

Assistant coach(es)

- (Philippines) Rensy Bajar (1st assistant)
- (Philippines) Alfredo Jarencio II
- (Philippines) Jeff Napa

Team manager

- (Philippines) Pido Jarencio
- (Philippines) Waiyip Chong (assistant)

Legend

- (C) Team captain
- (CI) Commissioner's Cup Import
- (GI) Governors' Cup Import
- (EI) EASL Import
- (DP) Unsigned draft pick
- (FA) Free agent
- (IN) Inactive
- (S) Suspended
- (R) Rookie
- Injured

Roster

== Philippine Cup ==
=== Eliminations ===
==== Standings ====
Pos	Team	W	L	PCT	GB	Qualification
1	San Miguel Beermen	9	2	.818	—	Twice-to-beat in the quarterfinals
2	TNT Tropang Giga	8	3	.727 (Note: Head-to-head quotient:TNT 1.12, Magnolia 0.99, Barangay Ginebra 0.90)	1	Twice-to-beat in the quarterfinals
3	Magnolia Chicken Timplados Hotshots	8	3	.727	1	Best-of-three quarterfinals
4	Barangay Ginebra San Miguel	8	3	.727	1	Best-of-three quarterfinals
5	Meralco Bolts	7	4	.636	2	Best-of-three quarterfinals
6	NLEX Road Warriors	6	5	.545	3	Best-of-three quarterfinals
7	Converge FiberXers	5	6	.455 (Note: Head-to-head record: Converge 1–0 Blackwater)	4	Twice-to-win in the quarterfinals
8	Blackwater Bossing	5	6	.455	4	Twice-to-win in the quarterfinals
9	Rain or Shine Elasto Painters	4	7	.364	5	
10	NorthPort Batang Pier	3	8	.273 (Note: Head-to-head record: NorthPort 1–0 Phoenix)	6	
11	Phoenix Super LPG Fuel Masters	3	8	.273	6	
12	Terrafirma Dyip	0	11	.000	9	

Source: PBA.ph
Rules for classification: 1) winning percentage; 2) if two teams are tied, head-to-head record; if three or more teams are tied, head-to-head goal average (quotient); if tied for 8th, one-game playoff; 3) overall quotient; 4) coin toss

==== Game log ====
2022 PBA Philippine Cup game log
Total: 3–8
June: 2–4

Game	Date	Opponent	Score	High points	High rebounds	High assists	Location Attendance	Record
1	June 9	Rain or Shine	W 94–81	Robert Bolick (22)	Jamie Malonzo (15)	Bolick, Sumang (6)	Ynares Center	1–0
2	June 11	Terrafirma	W 100–86	Robert Bolick (26)	Jamie Malonzo (16)	Robert Bolick (10)	Ynares Center	2–0
3	June 15	Magnolia	L 77–80	Arwind Santos (18)	Arwind Santos (12)	Roi Sumang (4)	SM Mall of Asia Arena	2–1
4	June 18	Blackwater	L 90–97	Robert Bolick (21)	Malonzo, Santos (13)	Roi Sumang (5)	Ynares Center	2–2
5	June 23	Meralco	L 87–97	Jamie Malonzo (21)	Jamie Malonzo (9)	Robert Bolick (7)	Ynares Center	2–3
6	June 29	TNT	L 112–117	Jamie Malonzo (27)	Jamie Malonzo (8)	Roi Sumang (10)	Smart Araneta Coliseum	2–4

July: 1–4

Game	Date	Opponent	Score	High points	High rebounds	High assists	Location Attendance	Record
7	July 2	San Miguel	L 106–122	Arwind Santos (25)	Jamie Malonzo (9)	Jerrick Balanza (7)	Smart Araneta Coliseum	2–5
8	July 9	Converge	L 98–104	Kevin Ferrer (21)	Arwind Santos (12)	Roi Sumang (8)	Smart Araneta Coliseum	2–6
9	July 14	Phoenix Super LPG	W 95–92	Ferrer, Sumang (18)	Jamie Malonzo (8)	Bolick, Sumang (8)	Smart Araneta Coliseum	3–6
10	July 17	Barangay Ginebra	L 93–100	Robert Bolick (29)	Arwind Santos (9)	Roi Sumang (5)	Smart Araneta Coliseum	3–7
11	July 22	NLEX	L 95–109	JM Calma (21)	JM Calma (9)	Roi Sumang (10)	Smart Araneta Coliseum	3–8

== Commissioner's Cup ==
=== Eliminations ===
==== Standings ====
Pos	Team	W	L	PCT	GB	Qualification
1	Bay Area Dragons (G)	10	2	.833 (Note: Head-to-head record: Bay Area 1–0 Magnolia)	—	Twice-to-beat in the quarterfinals
2	Magnolia Chicken Timplados Hotshots	10	2	.833	—	Twice-to-beat in the quarterfinals
3	Barangay Ginebra San Miguel	9	3	.750	1	Best-of-three quarterfinals
4	Converge FiberXers	8	4	.667	2	Best-of-three quarterfinals
5	San Miguel Beermen	7	5	.583	3	Best-of-three quarterfinals
6	NorthPort Batang Pier	6	6	.500 (Note: Head-to-head record: NorthPort 1–0 Phoenix)	4	Best-of-three quarterfinals
7	Phoenix Super LPG Fuel Masters	6	6	.500	4	Twice-to-win in the quarterfinals
8	Rain or Shine Elasto Painters	5	7	.417 (Note: Eighth seed playoff: Rain or Shine 110–100 NLEX)	5	Twice-to-win in the quarterfinals
9	NLEX Road Warriors	5	7	.417	5	
10	Meralco Bolts	4	8	.333 (Note: Head-to-head record: Meralco 1–0 TNT)	6	
11	TNT Tropang Giga	4	8	.333	6	
12	Blackwater Bossing	3	9	.250	7	
13	Terrafirma Dyip	1	11	.083	9	

Source: PBA.ph
Rules for classification: 1) winning percentage; 2) if two teams are tied, head-to-head record; if three or more teams are tied, head-to-head goal average (quotient); if tied for 8th, one-game playoff; 3) overall quotient; 4) coin toss
(G) Guests

==== Game log ====
2022–23 PBA Commissioner's Cup game log
Total: 6–6
September: 2–1

Game	Date	Opponent	Score	High points	High rebounds	High assists	Location Attendance	Record
1	September 21, 2022	Phoenix Super LPG	W 92–89	Robert Bolick (21)	Prince Ibeh (15)	Arvin Tolentino (7)	SM Mall of Asia Arena	1–0
2	September 24, 2022	Bay Area	L 104–105	Robert Bolick (33)	Prince Ibeh (11)	Robert Bolick (5)	SM Mall of Asia Arena	1–1
3	September 30, 2022	Meralco	W 101–95 (OT)	Robert Bolick (44)	Prince Ibeh (11)	Robert Bolick (7)	Smart Araneta Coliseum	2–1

October: 1–3

Game	Date	Opponent	Score	High points	High rebounds	High assists	Location Attendance	Record
4	October 8, 2022	TNT	L 93–117	Arvin Tolentino (19)	Prince Ibeh (12)	Robert Bolick (7)	PhilSports Arena	2–2
5	October 12, 2022	Blackwater	W 87–83	Prince Ibeh (19)	Prince Ibeh (10)	Robert Bolick (10)	Smart Araneta Coliseum	3–2
6	October 16, 2022	Magnolia	L 91–109	Kevin Ferrer (19)	Prince Ibeh (13)	Balanza, Sumang, Tolentino (3)	Smart Araneta Coliseum	3–3
7	October 26, 2022	San Miguel	L 86–104	Prince Ibeh (16)	Prince Ibeh (16)	Robert Bolick (7)	Ynares Center	3–4

November: 3–2

Game	Date	Opponent	Score	High points	High rebounds	High assists	Location Attendance	Record
8	November 4, 2022	Rain or Shine	L 75–76	Robert Bolick (18)	Ibeh, Navarro (11)	Bolick, Sumang (4)	Smart Araneta Coliseum	3–5
9	November 9, 2022	NLEX	W 107–94	Robert Bolick (33)	Prince Ibeh (17)	Bolick, Navarro (7)	Smart Araneta Coliseum	4–5
10	November 12, 2022	Terrafirma	W 91–85	Arvin Tolentino (31)	Prince Ibeh (17)	Robert Bolick (10)	Ynares Center	5–5
11	November 20, 2022	Converge	W 112–97	William Navarro (29)	William Navarro (17)	Robert Bolick (10)	Smart Araneta Coliseum	6–5
12	November 27, 2022	Barangay Ginebra	L 105–122	Arvin Tolentino (24)	Prince Ibeh (13)	Navarro, Sumang (5)	PhilSports Arena	6–6

=== Playoffs ===
==== Bracket ====
Quarterfinals
(#1 twice-to-beat)
1	Bay Area	126
8	Rain or Shine	96
(best-of-3)
4	Converge	0
5	San Miguel	2
(#2 twice-to-beat)
2	Magnolia	102
7	Phoenix Super LPG	95
(best-of-3)
3	Barangay Ginebra	2
6	NorthPort	0

Semifinals (Best-of-5)
1	Bay Area	3
5	San Miguel	1
2	Magnolia	1
3	Barangay Ginebra	3

Finals (Best-of-7)
1	Bay Area	3
3	Barangay Ginebra	4

==== Game log ====
2022–23 PBA Commissioner's Cup playoffs game log
Total: 0–2
Quarterfinals: 0–2

Game	Date	Opponent	Score	High points	High rebounds	High assists	Location Attendance	Series
1	December 7, 2022	Barangay Ginebra	L 102–118	Arvin Tolentino (29)	Prince Ibeh (15)	Robert Bolick (6)	PhilSports Arena	0–1
2	December 10, 2022	Barangay Ginebra	L 93–99	Jeff Chan (20)	Prince Ibeh (12)	Jeff Chan (6)	PhilSports Arena	0–2

== Governors' Cup ==
=== Eliminations ===
==== Standings ====
Pos	Team	W	L	PCT	GB	Qualification
1	TNT Tropang Giga	10	1	.909	—	Twice-to-beat in quarterfinals
2	San Miguel Beermen	9	2	.818	1	Twice-to-beat in quarterfinals
3	Barangay Ginebra San Miguel	8	3	.727	2	Twice-to-beat in quarterfinals
4	Meralco Bolts	7	4	.636 (Note: Head-to-head quotient: Meralco 1.10, Magnolia 1.07, NLEX 0.86)	3	Twice-to-beat in quarterfinals
5	Magnolia Chicken Timplados Hotshots	7	4	.636	3	Twice-to-win in quarterfinals
6	NLEX Road Warriors	7	4	.636	3	Twice-to-win in quarterfinals
7	Converge FiberXers	6	5	.545	4	Twice-to-win in quarterfinals
8	Phoenix Super LPG Fuel Masters	4	7	.364	6	Twice-to-win in quarterfinals
9	NorthPort Batang Pier	3	8	.273	7	
10	Rain or Shine Elasto Painters	2	9	.182 (Note: Head-to-head record: Rain or Shine 1–0 Terrafirma)	8	
11	Terrafirma Dyip	2	9	.182	8	
12	Blackwater Bossing	1	10	.091	9	

Source: PBA.ph
Rules for classification: 1) winning percentage; 2) if two teams are tied, head-to-head record; if three or more teams are tied, head-to-head goal average (quotient); if tied for 8th, one-game playoff; 3) overall quotient; 4) coin toss

==== Game log ====
2023 PBA Governors' Cup game log
Total: 3–8
January: 0–3

Game	Date	Opponent	Score	High points	High rebounds	High assists	Location Attendance	Record
1	January 22	Converge	L 92–122	Marcus Weathers (37)	Marcus Weathers (12)	Chan, Salado, Weathers, Zamar (2)	PhilSports Arena	0–1
2	January 26	Meralco	L 102–107	Marcus Weathers (29)	Marcus Weathers (14)	Roi Sumang (6)	PhilSports Arena	0–2
3	January 28	NLEX	L 112–121	Marcus Weathers (30)	JM Calma (12)	Weathers, Zamar (4)	Ynares Center	0–3

February: 2–3

Game	Date	Opponent	Score	High points	High rebounds	High assists	Location Attendance	Record
4	February 2	Phoenix Super LPG	L 97–108	Marcus Weathers (31)	Marcus Weathers (9)	Jeff Chan (4)	PhilSports Arena	0–4
5	February 10	Barangay Ginebra	L 100–115	Kevin Murphy (38)	Kevin Murphy (11)	Kevin Murphy (4)	SM Mall of Asia Arena	0–5
6	February 15	San Miguel	L 132–145	Kevin Murphy (39)	Kevin Murphy (13)	Robert Bolick (10)	SM Mall of Asia Arena	0–6
7	February 22	Terrafirma	W 115–100	Kevin Murphy (28)	Bolick, Calma, Murphy (9)	Jeff Chan (9)	PhilSports Arena	1–6
8	February 25	Blackwater	W 110–104	Kevin Murphy (47)	Kevin Murphy (16)	Robert Bolick (6)	Smart Araneta Coliseum	2–6

March: 1–2

Game	Date	Opponent	Score	High points	High rebounds	High assists	Location Attendance	Record
9	March 2	Magnolia	L 109–129	Kevin Murphy (31)	Calma, Murphy (6)	Kevin Murphy (6)	Smart Araneta Coliseum	2–7
10	March 4	Rain or Shine	W 113–97	Kevin Murphy (39)	Kevin Murphy (13)	Robert Bolick (7)	PhilSports Arena	3–7
All-Star Break
11	March 15	TNT	L 110–134	Kevin Murphy (35)	Kevin Murphy (10)	Robert Bolick (6)	PhilSports Arena	3–8

== Transactions ==
=== Free agency ===
==== Signings ====
Player	Date signed	Contract amount	Contract length	Former team
Jerrick Balanza	May 14, 2022	Not disclosed	2 years	Re-signed
Arwind Santos	May 19, 2022	Not disclosed	1 year	Re-signed
Louie Vigil	May 19, 2022	Not disclosed	1 year	San Miguel Beermen
Roi Sumang	May 28, 2022	Not disclosed	1 year	Re-signed
Renzo Subido	May 28, 2022	Not disclosed	1 year	Re-signed
Jamie Malonzo	May 30, 2022	Not disclosed	1 year	Re-signed
Chris Javier	June 3, 2022	Not disclosed	Not disclosed	TNT Tropang Giga
William Navarro	October 24, 2022	Not disclosed	2 conferences	—
Paul Zamar	January 17, 2023	Not disclosed	1 year	Re-signed
Christian Balagasay	January 17, 2023	Not disclosed	Not disclosed	Terrafirma Dyip
Robert Bolick	February 8, 2023	Not disclosed	1 conference	Re-signed

=== Trades ===
==== Pre-season ====
June
June 3, 2022	To NorthPort MJ Ayaay	To Barangay Ginebra 2023 NorthPort second-round pick

==== Mid-season ====
September
September 20, 2022	To NorthPort Prince Caperal; Arvin Tolentino; 2022 Barangay Ginebra first-round pick	To Barangay Ginebra Jamie Malonzo
September 20, 2022	To NorthPort Jeff Chan; Kent Salado	To Barangay Ginebra Von Pessumal	To San Miguel 2024 NorthPort second-round pick 2025 NorthPort second-round pick

==== Commissioner's Cup ====
January
January 4, 2023	To NorthPort Allyn Bulanadi	To Converge Jerrick Balanza
January 5, 2023	To NorthPort Paul Zamar; 2025 San Miguel second-round pick	To San Miguel Allyn Bulanadi
January 12, 2023	To NorthPort Joshua Munzon	To Terrafirma Kevin Ferrer

=== Recruited imports ===
Tournament	Name	Debuted	Last game	Record
Commissioner's Cup	Prince Ibeh	September 21, 2022 (vs. Phoenix)	December 10, 2022 (vs. Barangay Ginebra)	6–8
Governors' Cup	Marcus Weathers	January 22, 2023 (vs. Converge)	February 2, 2023 (vs. Phoenix)	0–4
Governors' Cup	Kevin Murphy	February 10, 2023 (vs. Barangay Ginebra)	March 15, 2023 (vs. TNT)	3–4

== Awards ==
Recipient	Honors	Date awarded
Robert Bolick	2022–23 PBA Mythical Second Team	November 5, 2023
Arvin Tolentino	2022–23 PBA Mythical Second Team	November 5, 2023
Roi Sumang	2022–23 PBA Comeback Player of the Year	November 19, 2023
