= Gian Mamuyac =

Filipino basketball player

No. 5 – Phoenix Super LPG Fuel Masters
- Position: Shooting guard / point guard
- League: PBA

Personal information
- Born: March 5, 1999 (age 27) Quezon City, Philippines
- Listed height: 6 ft 2 in (1.88 m)
- Listed weight: 165 lb (75 kg)

Career information
- High school: Ateneo (Quezon City)
- College: Ateneo
- PBA draft: 2022: 1st round, 5th overall pick
- Drafted by: Rain or Shine Elasto Painters
- Playing career: 2022–present

Career history
- 2022–2026: Rain or Shine Elasto Painters
- 2026–present: Phoenix Super LPG Fuel Masters

Career highlights
- 2× PBA All-Star (2023, 2026); PBA Sportsmanship Award (2025); 3× UAAP champion (2017–2019)

Gian Robert J. Mamuyac (born March 5, 1999) is a Filipino professional basketball player for the Phoenix Super LPG Fuel Masters of the Philippine Basketball Association (PBA).

A three-time University Athletic Association of the Philippines (UAAP) men's basketball champion with the Ateneo de Manila University Blue Eagles, he was selected fifth overall in the PBA season 47 draft in 2022. He is a two-time PBA All-Star.

== Professional career ==
=== Rain or Shine Elasto Painters (2022–2026) ===
Mamuyac was selected 5th overall pick by the Rain or Shine Elasto Painters in 2022 PBA draft. As a rookie, he earned his first PBA All-Star Game selection in 2023.

=== Phoenix Super LPG Fuel Masters (2026–present) ===
On July 16, 2026, Mamuyac, along with a season 53 draft second-round pick, was traded to the Phoenix Super LPG Fuel Masters for a season 53 draft first-round pick.

== PBA career statistics ==
Legend
GP	Games played	MPG	Minutes per game	FG%	Field-goal percentage
3FG%	3-point field-goal percentage	4P%	4-point field-goal percentage	FT%	Free-throw percentage
RPG	Rebounds per game	APG	Assists per game	SPG	Steals per game
BPG	Blocks per game	PPG	Points per game	127	Career high

As of the end of 2025–26 season

=== Season-by-season averages ===
Year	Team	GP	MPG	FG%	3P%	4P%	FT%	RPG	APG	SPG	BPG	PPG
2022–23	Rain or Shine	30	21.8	.432	.269	—	.744	3.0	2.1	1.1	.2	9.9
2023–24	Rain or Shine	29	22.0	.494	.222	—	.681	2.8	2.4	.9	.2	10.7
2024–25	Rain or Shine	44	24.8	.370	.160	.000	.807	3.4	2.6	1.1	.3	10.3
2025–26	Rain or Shine	43	24.8	.450	.252	.000	.723	3.3	3.0	1.0	.2	12.4
2025–26	Phoenix Super LPG	43	24.8	.450	.252	.000	.723	3.3	3.0	1.0	.2	12.4
Career		146	23.6	.430	.227	.000	.747	3.2	2.6	1.0	.2	10.9

== Personal life ==
In September 2016, Mamuyac became viral after blocking a three-point attempt from two-time NBA Most Valuable Player Stephen Curry during one of his tours in Taiwan.
