= 2022–23 Rain or Shine Elasto Painters season =

- Head coach: Chris Gavina (Philippine Cup); Yeng Guiao
- Owners: Asian Coatings Philippines, Inc.

Philippine Cup results
- Record: 4–7 (36.4%)
- Place: 9th
- Playoff finish: Did not qualify

Commissioner's Cup results
- Record: 5–7 (41.7%)
- Place: 8th
- Playoff finish: Quarterfinalist (lost to Bay Area with twice-to-win disadvantage)

Governors' Cup results
- Record: 2–9 (18.2%)
- Place: 10th
- Playoff finish: Did not qualify

Rain or Shine Elasto Painters seasons

The 2022–23 Rain or Shine Elasto Painters season was the 16th season of the franchise in the Philippine Basketball Association (PBA).

== Key dates ==
- May 15: The PBA season 47 draft was held at the Robinsons Place Manila in Manila.

== Draft picks ==
| Round | Pick | Player | Position | Place of birth | College |
|---|---|---|---|---|---|
| 1 | 5 | Gian Mamuyac | G | Philippines | Ateneo |
| 1 | 10 | Shaun Ildefonso | G/F | Philippines | NU |
| 2 | 17 | Jhonard Clarito | F | Philippines | De Ocampo |
| 2 | 18 | RJ Ramirez | G | Canada | FEU |
| 3 | 29 | Rhaffy Octobre | F | Philippines | UV |

== Roster ==
2022–23 Rain or Shine Elasto Painters roster
Players
Coaches

| Pos. | # | POB | Name | Height | Weight | DOB (YYYY–MM–DD) | From |
|---|---|---|---|---|---|---|---|
| G | 3 | (Philippines) | Gian Mamuyac (R) | 6 ft 2 in (1.88 m) | 165 lb (75 kg) | 1999–03–05 | Ateneo |
| F | 5 | (United States) | Gabe Norwood (C) | 6 ft 6 in (1.98 m) | 190 lb (86 kg) | 1985–02–09 | George Mason |
| F | 7 | (Philippines) | Mike Nieto | 6 ft 2 in (1.88 m) | 200 lb (91 kg) | 1997–05–31 | Ateneo |
| G | 8 | (Philippines) | Anton Asistio | 5 ft 10 in (1.78 m) | 175 lb (79 kg) | 1995–06–02 | Ateneo |
| G/F | 10 | (Philippines) | Shaun Ildefonso (R) | 6 ft 2 in (1.88 m) | 198 lb (90 kg) | 1997–09–30 | National-U |
| F | 12 | (Philippines) | Vince Tolentino | 6 ft 3 in (1.91 m) | 190 lb (86 kg) | 1993–08–27 | Ateneo |
| G | 14 | (Philippines) | Andrei Caracut | 5 ft 10 in (1.78 m) | 180 lb (82 kg) | 1996–01–30 | De La Salle |
| F/C | 15 | (Philippines) | Jewel Ponferada | 6 ft 5 in (1.96 m) | 211 lb (96 kg) | 1988–07–08 | National-U |
| F | 16 | (Philippines) | Mark Borboran | 6 ft 4 in (1.93 m) | 185 lb (84 kg) | 1984–11–01 | UE |
| G/F | 18 | (Philippines) | James Yap | 6 ft 2 in (1.88 m) | 205 lb (93 kg) | 1982–02–15 | UE |
| G/F | 22 | (Philippines) | Jhonard Clarito (R) | 6 ft 2 in (1.88 m) | 187 lb (85 kg) | 1996–04–03 | De Ocampo |
| F | 25 | (Philippines) | Leonard Santillan | 6 ft 4 in (1.93 m) | 210 lb (95 kg) | 1996–03–05 | De La Salle |
| G | 27 | (Philippines) | Rey Nambatac | 5 ft 11 in (1.80 m) | | 1994–01–27 | Letran |
| F/C | 28 | (Philippines) | Beau Belga | 6 ft 5 in (1.96 m) | 245 lb (111 kg) | 1986–11–30 | Philippine Christian |
| F/C | 29 | (Canada) | Norbert Torres | 6 ft 7 in (2.01 m) | 250 lb (113 kg) | 1990–01–12 | De La Salle |
| F | 31 | (Philippines) | Nick Demusis | 6 ft 4 in (1.93 m) | 205 lb (93 kg) | 1991–05–09 | Whittier |

Head coach

- (Philippines) Yeng Guiao

Assistant coach(es)

- (Philippines) Caloy Garcia (1st assistant)
- (Philippines) Mike Buendia
- (Philippines) Ricky Umayam

Team manager

- (Philippines) Mamerto Mondragon^{[a]}
- (Philippines) Jireh Ibañes (assistant)

Legend

- (C) Team captain
- (CI) Commissioner's Cup Import
- (GI) Governors' Cup Import
- (EI) EASL Import
- (DP) Unsigned draft pick
- (FA) Free agent
- (IN) Inactive
- (S) Suspended
- (R) Rookie
- Injured

Roster

- ^{a} also serves as Rain or Shine's board governor.

== Philippine Cup ==
=== Eliminations ===
==== Standings ====
| Pos | Team | W | L | PCT | GB | Qualification |
|---|---|---|---|---|---|---|
| 1 | San Miguel Beermen | 9 | 2 | .818 | — | Twice-to-beat in the quarterfinals |
| 2 | TNT Tropang Giga | 8 | 3 | .727 (Note: Head-to-head quotient:TNT 1.12, Magnolia 0.99, Barangay Ginebra 0.90) | 1 | Twice-to-beat in the quarterfinals |
| 3 | Magnolia Chicken Timplados Hotshots | 8 | 3 | .727 | 1 | Best-of-three quarterfinals |
| 4 | Barangay Ginebra San Miguel | 8 | 3 | .727 | 1 | Best-of-three quarterfinals |
| 5 | Meralco Bolts | 7 | 4 | .636 | 2 | Best-of-three quarterfinals |
| 6 | NLEX Road Warriors | 6 | 5 | .545 | 3 | Best-of-three quarterfinals |
| 7 | Converge FiberXers | 5 | 6 | .455 (Note: Head-to-head record: Converge 1–0 Blackwater) | 4 | Twice-to-win in the quarterfinals |
| 8 | Blackwater Bossing | 5 | 6 | .455 | 4 | Twice-to-win in the quarterfinals |
| 9 | Rain or Shine Elasto Painters | 4 | 7 | .364 | 5 | |
| 10 | NorthPort Batang Pier | 3 | 8 | .273 (Note: Head-to-head record: NorthPort 1–0 Phoenix) | 6 | |
| 11 | Phoenix Super LPG Fuel Masters | 3 | 8 | .273 | 6 | |
| 12 | Terrafirma Dyip | 0 | 11 | .000 | 9 | |

Source: PBA.ph
Rules for classification: 1) winning percentage; 2) if two teams are tied, head-to-head record; if three or more teams are tied, head-to-head goal average (quotient); if tied for 8th, one-game playoff; 3) overall quotient; 4) coin toss

==== Game log ====
2022 PBA Philippine Cup game log
Total: 4–7
June: 1–5

| Game | Date | Opponent | Score | High points | High rebounds | High assists | Location Attendance | Record |
|---|---|---|---|---|---|---|---|---|
| 1 | June 5 | Converge | W 79–77 | Leonard Santillan (18) | Norbert Torres (10) | Gabe Norwood (5) | Smart Araneta Coliseum; 8,241 | 1–0 |
| 2 | June 9 | NorthPort | L 81–94 | Mike Nieto (19) | Nick Demusis (8) | Mike Nieto (4) | Ynares Center | 1–1 |
| 3 | June 15 | Barangay Ginebra | L 85–90 | Mike Nieto (15) | Belga, Demusis (10) | Beau Belga (7) | SM Mall of Asia Arena | 1–2 |
| 4 | June 19 | Phoenix Super LPG | L 102–106 | Rey Nambatac (27) | Nick Demusis (8) | Beau Belga (6) | SM Mall of Asia Arena | 1–3 |
| 5 | June 23 | TNT | L 85–89 (OT) | Mike Nieto (19) | Belga, Santillan (10) | Beau Belga (7) | Ynares Center | 1–4 |
| 6 | June 29 | San Miguel | L 93–99 | Jewel Ponferada (20) | Andrei Caracut (7) | Andrei Caracut (7) | Smart Araneta Coliseum | 1–5 |

July: 3–2

| Game | Date | Opponent | Score | High points | High rebounds | High assists | Location Attendance | Record |
|---|---|---|---|---|---|---|---|---|
| 7 | July 6 | Meralco | L 73–77 | Gabe Norwood (13) | Gabe Norwood (9) | Belga, Borboran, Norwood (3) | Smart Araneta Coliseum | 1–6 |
| 8 | July 9 | NLEX | W 96–86 | Leonard Santillan (18) | Mike Nieto (7) | Belga, Norwood (4) | Smart Araneta Coliseum | 2–6 |
| 9 | July 13 | Blackwater | W 107–90 | Rey Nambatac (26) | Gabe Norwood (8) | Rey Nambatac (4) | Smart Araneta Coliseum | 3–6 |
| 10 | July 16 | Terrafirma | W 97–82 | Asistio, Caracut (14) | Rey Nambatac (10) | Rey Nambatac (9) | SM Mall of Asia Arena | 4–6 |
| 11 | July 20 | Magnolia | L 87–118 | Leonard Santillan (17) | Leonard Santillan (8) | Andrei Caracut (10) | Smart Araneta Coliseum | 4–7 |

== Commissioner's Cup ==
=== Eliminations ===
==== Standings ====
| Pos | Team | W | L | PCT | GB | Qualification |
|---|---|---|---|---|---|---|
| 1 | Bay Area Dragons (G) | 10 | 2 | .833 (Note: Head-to-head record: Bay Area 1–0 Magnolia) | — | Twice-to-beat in the quarterfinals |
| 2 | Magnolia Chicken Timplados Hotshots | 10 | 2 | .833 | — | Twice-to-beat in the quarterfinals |
| 3 | Barangay Ginebra San Miguel | 9 | 3 | .750 | 1 | Best-of-three quarterfinals |
| 4 | Converge FiberXers | 8 | 4 | .667 | 2 | Best-of-three quarterfinals |
| 5 | San Miguel Beermen | 7 | 5 | .583 | 3 | Best-of-three quarterfinals |
| 6 | NorthPort Batang Pier | 6 | 6 | .500 (Note: Head-to-head record: NorthPort 1–0 Phoenix) | 4 | Best-of-three quarterfinals |
| 7 | Phoenix Super LPG Fuel Masters | 6 | 6 | .500 | 4 | Twice-to-win in the quarterfinals |
| 8 | Rain or Shine Elasto Painters | 5 | 7 | .417 (Note: Eighth seed playoff: Rain or Shine 110–100 NLEX) | 5 | Twice-to-win in the quarterfinals |
| 9 | NLEX Road Warriors | 5 | 7 | .417 | 5 | |
| 10 | Meralco Bolts | 4 | 8 | .333 (Note: Head-to-head record: Meralco 1–0 TNT) | 6 | |
| 11 | TNT Tropang Giga | 4 | 8 | .333 | 6 | |
| 12 | Blackwater Bossing | 3 | 9 | .250 | 7 | |
| 13 | Terrafirma Dyip | 1 | 11 | .083 | 9 | |

Source: PBA.ph
Rules for classification: 1) winning percentage; 2) if two teams are tied, head-to-head record; if three or more teams are tied, head-to-head goal average (quotient); if tied for 8th, one-game playoff; 3) overall quotient; 4) coin toss
(G) Guests

==== Game log ====
2022–23 PBA Commissioner's Cup game log
Total: 5–7
September: 1–1

| Game | Date | Opponent | Score | High points | High rebounds | High assists | Location Attendance | Record |
|---|---|---|---|---|---|---|---|---|
| 1 | September 23, 2022 | NLEX | L 90–96 | Steve Taylor Jr. (21) | Beau Belga (14) | Andrei Caracut (5) | PhilSports Arena | 0–1 |
| 2 | September 28, 2022 | Barangay Ginebra | W 93–71 | Steve Taylor Jr. (21) | Steve Taylor Jr. (10) | Rey Nambatac (9) | SM Mall of Asia Arena | 1–1 |

October: 2–3

| Game | Date | Opponent | Score | High points | High rebounds | High assists | Location Attendance | Record |
|---|---|---|---|---|---|---|---|---|
| 3 | October 2, 2022 | Terrafirma | W 106–94 | Steve Taylor Jr. (20) | Steve Taylor Jr. (24) | Mike Nieto (5) | Smart Araneta Coliseum | 2–1 |
| 4 | October 9, 2022 | San Miguel | L 105–113 | Steve Taylor Jr. (20) | Steve Taylor Jr. (18) | Steve Taylor Jr. (9) | PhilSports Arena | 2–2 |
| 5 | October 15, 2022 | TNT | L 91–110 | Rey Nambatac (20) | Leonard Santillan (10) | Asistio, Nambatac (4) | Smart Araneta Coliseum | 2–3 |
| 6 | October 22, 2022 | Meralco | W 113–96 | Steve Taylor Jr. (22) | Steve Taylor Jr. (15) | Rey Nambatac (9) | PhilSports Arena | 3–3 |
| 7 | October 26, 2022 | Phoenix Super LPG | L 83–92 | Steve Taylor Jr. (16) | Steve Taylor Jr. (19) | Gian Mamuyac (6) | Ynares Center | 3–4 |

November: 2–2

| Game | Date | Opponent | Score | High points | High rebounds | High assists | Location Attendance | Record |
|---|---|---|---|---|---|---|---|---|
| 8 | November 4, 2022 | NorthPort | W 76–75 | Steve Taylor Jr. (20) | Steve Taylor Jr. (16) | Rey Nambatac (4) | Smart Araneta Coliseum | 4–4 |
| 9 | November 11, 2022 | Bay Area | L 87–120 | Anton Asistio (20) | Mike Nieto (7) | Anton Asistio (4) | Ynares Center | 4–5 |
| 10 | November 13, 2022 | Converge | L 101–102 | Ryan Pearson (25) | Ryan Pearson (10) | Gabe Norwood (7) | Smart Araneta Coliseum | 4–6 |
| 11 | November 25, 2022 | Blackwater | W 116–97 | Ryan Pearson (22) | Ryan Pearson (12) | Anton Asistio (6) | PhilSports Arena | 5–6 |

December: 0–1

| Game | Date | Opponent | Score | High points | High rebounds | High assists | Location Attendance | Record |
|---|---|---|---|---|---|---|---|---|
| 12 | December 2, 2022 | Magnolia | L 90–106 | Nambatac, Santillan (15) | Leonard Santillan (12) | Gian Mamuyac (5) | PhilSports Arena | 5–7 |

=== Playoffs ===
==== Bracket ====
Quarterfinals
(#1 twice-to-beat)
1 | Bay Area | 126
8 | Rain or Shine | 96
(best-of-3)
4 | Converge | 0
5 | San Miguel | 2
(#2 twice-to-beat)
2 | Magnolia | 102
7 | Phoenix Super LPG | 95
(best-of-3)
3 | Barangay Ginebra | 2
6 | NorthPort | 0

Semifinals (Best-of-5)
1 | Bay Area | 3
5 | San Miguel | 1
2 | Magnolia | 1
3 | Barangay Ginebra | 3

Finals (Best-of-7)
1 | Bay Area | 3
3 | Barangay Ginebra | 4

==== Game log ====
2022–23 PBA Commissioner's Cup playoffs game log
Total: 1–1
8th seed playoff: 1–0

| Game | Date | Opponent | Score | High points | High rebounds | High assists | Location Attendance | Series |
|---|---|---|---|---|---|---|---|---|
| 1 | December 4, 2022 | NLEX | W 110–100 | Ryan Pearson (24) | Ryan Pearson (9) | Caracut, Mamuyac, Norwood, Pearson (3) | PhilSports Arena | 1–0 |

Quarterfinals: 0–1

| Game | Date | Opponent | Score | High points | High rebounds | High assists | Location Attendance | Series |
|---|---|---|---|---|---|---|---|---|
| 1 | December 9, 2022 | Bay Area | L 96–126 | Rey Nambatac (19) | Mamuyac, Nieto, Pearson (5) | Andrei Caracut (11) | PhilSports Arena | 0–1 |

== Governors' Cup ==
=== Eliminations ===
==== Standings ====
| Pos | Team | W | L | PCT | GB | Qualification |
|---|---|---|---|---|---|---|
| 1 | TNT Tropang Giga | 10 | 1 | .909 | — | Twice-to-beat in quarterfinals |
| 2 | San Miguel Beermen | 9 | 2 | .818 | 1 | Twice-to-beat in quarterfinals |
| 3 | Barangay Ginebra San Miguel | 8 | 3 | .727 | 2 | Twice-to-beat in quarterfinals |
| 4 | Meralco Bolts | 7 | 4 | .636 (Note: Head-to-head quotient: Meralco 1.099, Magnolia 1.0741, NLEX 0.86) | 3 | Twice-to-beat in quarterfinals |
| 5 | Magnolia Chicken Timplados Hotshots | 7 | 4 | .636 | 3 | Twice-to-win in quarterfinals |
| 6 | NLEX Road Warriors | 7 | 4 | .636 | 3 | Twice-to-win in quarterfinals |
| 7 | Converge FiberXers | 6 | 5 | .545 | 4 | Twice-to-win in quarterfinals |
| 8 | Phoenix Super LPG Fuel Masters | 4 | 7 | .364 | 6 | Twice-to-win in quarterfinals |
| 9 | NorthPort Batang Pier | 3 | 8 | .273 | 7 | |
| 10 | Rain or Shine Elasto Painters | 2 | 9 | .182 | 8 | |
| 11 | Terrafirma Dyip | 2 | 9 | .182 | 8 | |
| 12 | Blackwater Bossing | 1 | 10 | .091 | 9 | |

Source: PBA.ph
Rules for classification: 1) winning percentage; 2) if two teams are tied, head-to-head record; if three or more teams are tied, head-to-head goal average (quotient); if tied for 8th, one-game playoff; 3) overall quotient; 4) coin toss

==== Game log ====
2023 PBA Governors' Cup game log
Total: 2–9
January: 0–2

| Game | Date | Opponent | Score | High points | High rebounds | High assists | Location Attendance | Record |
|---|---|---|---|---|---|---|---|---|
| 1 | January 22 | Meralco | L 87–105 | Rey Nambatac (21) | Michael Qualls (15) | Michael Qualls (5) | PhilSports Arena | 0–1 |
| 2 | January 27 | TNT | L 100–105 | Michael Qualls (35) | Michael Qualls (17) | Norwood, Qualls (5) | Ynares Center | 0–2 |

February: 2–4

| Game | Date | Opponent | Score | High points | High rebounds | High assists | Location Attendance | Record |
|---|---|---|---|---|---|---|---|---|
| 3 | February 2 | Converge | L 98–112 | Michael Qualls (34) | Michael Qualls (9) | Rey Nambatac (6) | PhilSports Arena | 0–3 |
| 4 | February 5 | Barangay Ginebra | L 108–116 | Michael Qualls (23) | Beau Belga (6) | Nambatac, Norwood (4) | Smart Araneta Coliseum; 10,080 | 0–4 |
| 5 | February 12 | Blackwater | W 122–117 | Greg Smith II (38) | Belga, Norwood, Santillan (7) | Anton Asistio (6) | SM Mall of Asia Arena; 11,212 | 1–4 |
| 6 | February 16 | Terrafirma | W 120–118 | Andrei Caracut (25) | Belga, Santillan (6) | Beau Belga (8) | Smart Araneta Coliseum | 2–4 |
| 7 | February 22 | Magnolia | L 97–112 | Greg Smith II (15) | Leonard Santillan (7) | Andrei Caracut (6) | PhilSports Arena | 2–5 |
| 8 | February 25 | NLEX | L 99–110 | Rey Nambatac (26) | Gabe Norwood (8) | Beau Belga (6) | Smart Araneta Coliseum | 2–6 |

March: 0–3

| Game | Date | Opponent | Score | High points | High rebounds | High assists | Location Attendance | Record |
|---|---|---|---|---|---|---|---|---|
| 9 | March 1 | Phoenix Super LPG | L 106–114 | Santillan, Torres (14) | Nick Demusis (11) | Rey Nambatac (7) | Smart Araneta Coliseum | 2–7 |
| 10 | March 4 | NorthPort | L 97–113 | Leonard Santillan (17) | Beau Belga (8) | Beau Belga (4) | PhilSports Arena | 2–8 |
All-Star Break
| 11 | March 17 | San Miguel | L 116–129 | Gian Mamuyac (23) | Gian Mamuyac (10) | Andrei Caracut (7) | PhilSports Arena | 2–9 |

== Transactions ==
=== Free agency ===
==== Signings ====
| Player | Date signed | Contract amount | Contract length | Former team |
|---|---|---|---|---|
| Jewel Ponferada | October 8, 2022 | Not disclosed | 2 years | Re-signed |
| James Yap | January 6, 2023 | Not disclosed | 1 conference | Re-signed |

=== Trades ===
==== Philippine Cup ====
June
| June 7, 2022 | To Rain or Shine Nick Demusis; 2022 Phoenix first-round draft pick 2023 Phoenix second-round draft pick | To Phoenix Javee Mocon |

=== Recruited imports ===
| Tournament | Name | Debuted | Last game | Record |
|---|---|---|---|---|
| Commissioner's Cup | Steve Taylor Jr. | September 23, 2022 (vs. NLEX) | November 4, 2022 (vs. NorthPort) | 4–3 |
| Commissioner's Cup | Ryan Pearson | November 11, 2022 (vs. Bay Area) | December 9, 2022 (vs. Bay Area) | 2–4 |
| Governors' Cup | Michael Qualls | January 22, 2023 (vs. Meralco) | February 5, 2023 (vs. Barangay Ginebra) | 0–4 |
| Governors' Cup | Greg Smith II | February 12, 2023 (vs. Blackwater) | February 25, 2023 (vs. NLEX) | 1–2 |
