= 2022–23 Phoenix Super LPG Fuel Masters season =

- Head coach: Topex Robinson (Philippine and Commissioner's Cup); Jamike Jarin (interim)
- Owner: Phoenix Petroleum Philippines, Inc.

Philippine Cup results
- Record: 3–8 (27.3%)
- Place: 11th
- Playoff finish: Did not qualify

Commissioner's Cup results
- Record: 6–6 (50%)
- Place: 7th
- Playoff finish: Quarterfinalist (lost to Magnolia with twice-to-win disadvantage)

Governors' Cup results
- Record: 4–7 (36.4%)
- Place: 8th
- Playoff finish: Quarterfinalist (lost to TNT with twice-to-win disadvantage)

Phoenix Super LPG Fuel Masters seasons

The 2022–23 Phoenix Super LPG Fuel Masters season was the 7th season of the franchise in the Philippine Basketball Association (PBA).

== Key dates ==
- May 15: The PBA season 47 draft was held at the Robinsons Place Manila in Manila.

== Draft picks ==
Round	Pick	Player	Position	Place of birth	College
2	14	Tyler Tio	G	Philippines	Ateneo
2	16	Chris Lalata	C/F	Philippines	Olivarez
2	19	Encho Serrano	G	Philippines	De La Salle
2	23	Enzo Joson	G	Philippines	NU
3	28	Alvin Baetiong	C	Philippines	San Sebastian
4	39	Leonard Esguerra	C	Philippines	José Rizal
5	47	Niño Ibañez	G	Philippines	Lyceum
6	51	Nichole John Ubalde	G	Philippines	USTP

== Roster ==
2022–23 Phoenix Super LPG Fuel Masters roster
Players
Coaches

Pos.	#	POB	Name	Height	Weight	DOB (YYYY–MM–DD)	From
C	1	(Philippines)	Larry Muyang	6 ft 6 in (1.98 m)	220 lb (100 kg)	1995–06–04	Letran
F	2	(United States)	Sean Manganti	6 ft 5 in (1.96 m)		1994–04–18	Adamson
G	3	(Philippines)	Kurt Lojera (R)	6 ft 1 in (1.85 m)	188 lb (85 kg)	1995–10–16	De La Salle
C	4	(Philippines)	Raul Soyud	6 ft 6 in (1.98 m)	222 lb (101 kg)	1991–01–14	UP Diliman
F	6	(Philippines)	Chris Lalata (R)	6 ft 5 in (1.96 m)	198 lb (90 kg)	1995–01–09	Olivarez
F	7	(Philippines)	Javee Mocon	6 ft 3 in (1.91 m)	189 lb (86 kg)	1995–04–07	San Beda
G	8	(Philippines)	RR Garcia	5 ft 11 in (1.80 m)	165 lb (75 kg)	1990–01–12	Far Eastern
F/C	11	(Philippines)	Ben Adamos	6 ft 7 in (2.01 m)	200 lb (91 kg)	1995–12–30	UPHSD
G	12	(Philippines)	Jjay Alejandro	6 ft 0 in (1.83 m)	165 lb (75 kg)	1995–04–13	National-U
G	13	(Philippines)	RJ Jazul (C)	5 ft 11 in (1.80 m)	170 lb (77 kg)	1986–04–11	Letran
G	16	(Philippines)	Jollo Go (R)	5 ft 10 in (1.78 m)	166 lb (75 kg)	1997–01–16	De La Salle
G	18	(Philippines)	Encho Serrano (R)	6 ft 0 in (1.83 m)	176 lb (80 kg)	1999–09–18	De La Salle
G	19	(Philippines)	Tyler Tio (R)	6 ft 0 in (1.83 m)	170 lb (77 kg)	1998–04–05	Ateneo
F	20	(Philippines)	Simon Camacho	6 ft 5 in (1.96 m)			Adamson
F	30	(United States)	Jason Perkins	6 ft 4 in (1.93 m)	235 lb (107 kg)	1992–09–20	De La Salle

Head coach

- (Philippines) Jamike Jarin (interim)

Assistant coach(es)

- (Philippines) Jon Jacinto (1st assistant)
- (Philippines) Paolo Dizon
- (Philippines) Dondon Hontiveros
- (Philippines) Ian Anthony Sangco
- (Philippines) Willy Wilson

Team manager

- (Philippines) Paolo Bugia

Legend

- (C) Team captain
- (CI) Commissioner's Cup Import
- (GI) Governors' Cup Import
- (EI) EASL Import
- (DP) Unsigned draft pick
- (FA) Free agent
- (IN) Inactive
- (S) Suspended
- (R) Rookie
- Injured

Roster

== Philippine Cup ==
=== Eliminations ===
==== Standings ====
Pos	Team	W	L	PCT	GB	Qualification
1	San Miguel Beermen	9	2	.818	—	Twice-to-beat in the quarterfinals
2	TNT Tropang Giga	8	3	.727 (Note: Head-to-head quotient:TNT 1.12, Magnolia 0.99, Barangay Ginebra 0.90)	1	Twice-to-beat in the quarterfinals
3	Magnolia Chicken Timplados Hotshots	8	3	.727	1	Best-of-three quarterfinals
4	Barangay Ginebra San Miguel	8	3	.727	1	Best-of-three quarterfinals
5	Meralco Bolts	7	4	.636	2	Best-of-three quarterfinals
6	NLEX Road Warriors	6	5	.545	3	Best-of-three quarterfinals
7	Converge FiberXers	5	6	.455 (Note: Head-to-head record: Converge 1–0 Blackwater)	4	Twice-to-win in the quarterfinals
8	Blackwater Bossing	5	6	.455	4	Twice-to-win in the quarterfinals
9	Rain or Shine Elasto Painters	4	7	.364	5	
10	NorthPort Batang Pier	3	8	.273 (Note: Head-to-head record: NorthPort 1–0 Phoenix)	6	
11	Phoenix Super LPG Fuel Masters	3	8	.273	6	
12	Terrafirma Dyip	0	11	.000	9	

Source: PBA.ph
Rules for classification: 1) winning percentage; 2) if two teams are tied, head-to-head record; if three or more teams are tied, head-to-head goal average (quotient); if tied for 8th, one-game playoff; 3) overall quotient; 4) coin toss

==== Game log ====
2022 PBA Philippine Cup game log
Total: 3–8
June: 2–5

Game	Date	Opponent	Score	High points	High rebounds	High assists	Location Attendance	Record
1	June 8	San Miguel	L 100–108	Matthew Wright (22)	Jason Perkins (10)	Serrano, Wright (5)	Smart Araneta Coliseum	0–1
2	June 11	Meralco	L 98–109	Jason Perkins (28)	Javee Mocon (11)	Matthew Wright (5)	Ynares Center	0–2
3	June 17	Terrafirma	W 97–74	Jason Perkins (17)	Sean Anthony (12)	Matthew Wright (10)	Ynares Center	1–2
4	June 19	Rain or Shine	W 106–102	RJ Jazul (25)	Mocon, Perkins (9)	Matthew Wright (6)	SM Mall of Asia Arena	2–2
5	June 24	Magnolia	L 77–95	Javee Mocon (19)	Jason Perkins (8)	Matthew Wright (6)	SM Mall of Asia Arena	2–3
6	June 26	TNT	L 72–87	Anthony, Tio (13)	Sean Anthony (14)	Matthew Wright (4)	Ynares Center	2–4
7	June 30	NLEX	L 108–114 (OT)	Matthew Wright (19)	Larry Muyang (11)	Matthew Wright (8)	Smart Araneta Coliseum	2–5

July : 1–3

Game	Date	Opponent	Score	High points	High rebounds	High assists	Location Attendance	Record
8	July 8	Blackwater	L 89–91	Jason Perkins (22)	Jason Perkins (8)	Matthew Wright (8)	Smart Araneta Coliseum	2–6
9	July 14	NorthPort	L 92–95	Matthew Wright (20)	Javee Mocon (10)	Jason Perkins (4)	Smart Araneta Coliseum	2–7
10	July 16	Converge	W 89–66	Matthew Wright (15)	Muyang, Wright (8)	Jason Perkins (5)	SM Mall of Asia Arena	3–7
11	July 21	Barangay Ginebra	L 93–100	Jason Perkins (17)	Anthony, Melecio, Perkins (7)	Anthony, Tio (4)	Smart Araneta Coliseum	3–8

== Commissioner's Cup ==
=== Eliminations ===
==== Standings ====
Pos	Team	W	L	PCT	GB	Qualification
1	Bay Area Dragons (G)	10	2	.833 (Note: Head-to-head record: Bay Area 1–0 Magnolia)	—	Twice-to-beat in the quarterfinals
2	Magnolia Chicken Timplados Hotshots	10	2	.833	—	Twice-to-beat in the quarterfinals
3	Barangay Ginebra San Miguel	9	3	.750	1	Best-of-three quarterfinals
4	Converge FiberXers	8	4	.667	2	Best-of-three quarterfinals
5	San Miguel Beermen	7	5	.583	3	Best-of-three quarterfinals
6	NorthPort Batang Pier	6	6	.500 (Note: Head-to-head record: NorthPort 1–0 Phoenix)	4	Best-of-three quarterfinals
7	Phoenix Super LPG Fuel Masters	6	6	.500	4	Twice-to-win in the quarterfinals
8	Rain or Shine Elasto Painters	5	7	.417 (Note: Eighth seed playoff: Rain or Shine 110–100 NLEX)	5	Twice-to-win in the quarterfinals
9	NLEX Road Warriors	5	7	.417	5	
10	Meralco Bolts	4	8	.333 (Note: Head-to-head record: Meralco 1–0 TNT)	6	
11	TNT Tropang Giga	4	8	.333	6	
12	Blackwater Bossing	3	9	.250	7	
13	Terrafirma Dyip	1	11	.083	9	

Source: PBA.ph
Rules for classification: 1) winning percentage; 2) if two teams are tied, head-to-head record; if three or more teams are tied, head-to-head goal average (quotient); if tied for 8th, one-game playoff; 3) overall quotient; 4) coin toss
(G) Guests

==== Game log ====
2022–23 PBA Commissioner's Cup game log
Total: 6–6
September: 0–2

Game	Date	Opponent	Score	High points	High rebounds	High assists	Location Attendance	Record
1	September 21, 2022	NorthPort	L 89–92	Javee Mocon (24)	Kaleb Wesson (15)	Kaleb Wesson (7)	SM Mall of Asia Arena	0–1
2	September 24, 2022	Blackwater	L 85–97	Kaleb Wesson (28)	Kaleb Wesson (26)	Tyler Tio (6)	SM Mall of Asia Arena	0–2

October : 5–1

Game	Date	Opponent	Score	High points	High rebounds	High assists	Location Attendance	Record
3	October 1, 2022	Bay Area	L 91–101	Javee Mocon (22)	Kaleb Wesson (18)	RJ Jazul (7)	Smart Araneta Coliseum	0–3
4	October 8, 2022	NLEX	W 111–97	Tyler Tio (26)	Kaleb Wesson (21)	Tio, Wesson (7)	PhilSports Arena	1–3
5	October 14, 2022	Barangay Ginebra	W 101–93	Javee Mocon (20)	Kaleb Wesson (17)	Tyler Tio (7)	Smart Araneta Coliseum	2–3
6	October 19, 2022	Meralco	W 89–82	Kaleb Wesson (23)	Kaleb Wesson (13)	Javee Mocon (4)	PhilSports Arena	3–3
7	October 26, 2022	Rain or Shine	W 92–83	Kaleb Wesson (21)	Kaleb Wesson (17)	Encho Serrano (5)	Ynares Center	4–3
8	October 30, 2022	TNT	W 91–88	Kaleb Wesson (23)	Kaleb Wesson (17)	RJ Jazul (5)	Ynares Center	5–3

November : 1–3

Game	Date	Opponent	Score	High points	High rebounds	High assists	Location Attendance	Record
9	November 9, 2022	Converge	L 127–132	Kaleb Wesson (25)	Kaleb Wesson (21)	Kaleb Wesson (7)	Smart Araneta Coliseum	5–4
10	November 12, 2022	Magnolia	L 80–90	Sean Anthony (17)	Kaleb Wesson (18)	RJ Jazul (5)	Ynares Center	5–5
11	November 19, 2022	San Miguel	L 104–108	Javee Mocon (18)	Kaleb Wesson (13)	Kaleb Wesson (7)	PhilSports Arena	5–6
12	November 26, 2022	Terrafirma	W 135–84	RR Garcia (20)	Kaleb Wesson (12)	Garcia, Jazul, Wesson (3)	PhilSports Arena	6–6

=== Playoffs ===
==== Bracket ====
Quarterfinals
(#1 twice-to-beat)
1	Bay Area	126
8	Rain or Shine	96
(best-of-3)
4	Converge	0
5	San Miguel	2
(#2 twice-to-beat)
2	Magnolia	102
7	Phoenix Super LPG	95
(best-of-3)
3	Barangay Ginebra	2
6	NorthPort	0

Semifinals (Best-of-5)
1	Bay Area	3
5	San Miguel	1
2	Magnolia	1
3	Barangay Ginebra	3

Finals (Best-of-7)
1	Bay Area	3
3	Barangay Ginebra	4

==== Game log ====
2022–23 PBA Commissioner's Cup playoffs game log
Total: 0–1
Quarterfinals: 0–1

Game	Date	Opponent	Score	High points	High rebounds	High assists	Location Attendance	Series
1	December 9, 2022	Magnolia	L 95–102	Tyler Tio (18)	Kaleb Wesson (12)	Kaleb Wesson (9)	PhilSports Arena	0–1

== Governors' Cup ==
=== Eliminations ===
==== Standings ====
Pos	Team	W	L	PCT	GB	Qualification
1	TNT Tropang Giga	10	1	.909	—	Twice-to-beat in quarterfinals
2	San Miguel Beermen	9	2	.818	1	Twice-to-beat in quarterfinals
3	Barangay Ginebra San Miguel	8	3	.727	2	Twice-to-beat in quarterfinals
4	Meralco Bolts	7	4	.636 (Note: Head-to-head quotient: Meralco 1.099, Magnolia 1.0741, NLEX 0.86)	3	Twice-to-beat in quarterfinals
5	Magnolia Chicken Timplados Hotshots	7	4	.636	3	Twice-to-win in quarterfinals
6	NLEX Road Warriors	7	4	.636	3	Twice-to-win in quarterfinals
7	Converge FiberXers	6	5	.545	4	Twice-to-win in quarterfinals
8	Phoenix Super LPG Fuel Masters	4	7	.364	6	Twice-to-win in quarterfinals
9	NorthPort Batang Pier	3	8	.273	7	
10	Rain or Shine Elasto Painters	2	9	.182	8	
11	Terrafirma Dyip	2	9	.182	8	
12	Blackwater Bossing	1	10	.091	9	

Source: PBA.ph
Rules for classification: 1) winning percentage; 2) if two teams are tied, head-to-head record; if three or more teams are tied, head-to-head goal average (quotient); if tied for 8th, one-game playoff; 3) overall quotient; 4) coin toss

==== Game log ====
2023 PBA Governors' Cup game log
Total: 4–7
January: 0–3

Game	Date	Opponent	Score	High points	High rebounds	High assists	Location Attendance	Record
1	January 25	TNT	L 119–123	Du'Vaughn Maxwell (21)	Du'Vaughn Maxwell (19)	RR Garcia (8)	Smart Araneta Coliseum	0–1
2	January 27	Blackwater	L 105–108	Du'Vaughn Maxwell (37)	Du'Vaughn Maxwell (17)	Jason Perkins (6)	Ynares Center	0–2
3	January 29	San Miguel	L 93–114	Du'Vaughn Maxwell (21)	Du'Vaughn Maxwell (14)	Jason Perkins (5)	Ynares Center	0–3

February : 3–2

Game	Date	Opponent	Score	High points	High rebounds	High assists	Location Attendance	Record
4	February 2	NorthPort	W 108–97	Maxwell, Perkins (26)	Du'Vaughn Maxwell (11)	Du'Vaughn Maxwell (6)	PhilSports Arena	1–3
5	February 4	NLEX	L 94–98	Du'Vaughn Maxwell (25)	Jason Perkins (13)	Du'Vaughn Maxwell (7)	Ynares Center	1–4
6	February 10	Magnolia	L 95–108	Jason Perkins (20)	Du'Vaughn Maxwell (10)	Du'Vaughn Maxwell (5)	SM Mall of Asia Arena	1–5
7	February 18	Terrafirma	W 125–100	Du'Vaughn Maxwell (20)	Du'Vaughn Maxwell (12)	Du'Vaughn Maxwell (6)	Smart Araneta Coliseum	2–5
8	February 26	Converge	W 106–103	Encho Serrano (28)	Du'Vaughn Maxwell (15)	Garcia, Jazul, Maxwell, Mocon, Perkins (3)	Smart Araneta Coliseum	3–5

March : 1–2

Game	Date	Opponent	Score	High points	High rebounds	High assists	Location Attendance	Record
9	March 1	Rain or Shine	W 114–106	Garcia, Serrano (17)	Du'Vaughn Maxwell (13)	Lalata, Maxwell, Tio (4)	Smart Araneta Coliseum	4–5
10	March 3	Barangay Ginebra	L 89–109	Du'Vaughn Maxwell (22)	Du'Vaughn Maxwell (7)	Javee Mocon (6)	Smart Araneta Coliseum	4–6
11	March 5	Meralco	L 86–92	Du'Vaughn Maxwell (29)	Maxwell, Serrano (9)	Du'Vaughn Maxwell (3)	PhilSports Arena	4–7

=== Playoffs ===
==== Bracket ====
Quarterfinals (Top 4 twice-to-beat)
1	TNT	132
8	Phoenix Super LPG	105
4	Meralco	113*
5	Magnolia	107
2	San Miguel	121
7	Converge	105
3	Barangay Ginebra	127
6	NLEX	93

Semifinals (Best-of-5)
1	TNT	3
4	Meralco	1
2	San Miguel	0
3	Barangay Ginebra	3

Finals (Best-of-7)
1	TNT	4
3	Barangay Ginebra	2

*Game went into overtime

==== Game log ====
2023 PBA Governors' Cup playoffs game log
Total: 0–1
Quarterfinals: 0–1

Game	Date	Opponent	Score	High points	High rebounds	High assists	Location Attendance	Series
1	March 22	TNT	L 105–132	Du'Vaughn Maxwell (23)	Du'Vaughn Maxwell (10)	Javee Mocon (4)	Smart Araneta Coliseum	0–1

== Transactions ==
=== Free agency ===
==== Signings ====
Player	Date signed	Contract amount	Contract length	Former team
Nick Demusis	May 20, 2022	Not disclosed	1 year	Re-signed
Javee Mocon	June 7, 2022	Not disclosed	3 years	Re-signed
Jollo Go	January 24, 2023	Not disclosed	Not disclosed	Blackwater Bossing

==== Subtraction ====
Player	Number	Position	Reason	New team
Matthew Wright	7, 35	Shooting guard / small forward	End of contract; did not agree to term extension	Kyoto Hannaryz
Jansen Rios	5, 28	Small forward	End of contract	Meralco Bolts

=== Trades ===
==== Philippine Cup ====
June
June 7, 2022	To Phoenix Javee Mocon	To Rain or Shine Nick Demusis; 2022 Phoenix first-round draft pick 2023 Phoenix second-round draft pick

==== Mid-season ====
September
September 9, 2022	To Phoenix Ben Adamos; Kurt Lojera	To Converge Aljun Melecio; Kris Porter
January
January 18, 2023	To Phoenix Jjay Alejandro; Raul Soyud; 2022 NLEX second-round pick 2026 TNT second-round pick	To NLEX Sean Anthony; Jake Pascual	To TNT Justin Chua; Paul Varilla

=== Recruited imports ===
Tournament	Name	Debuted	Last game	Record
Commissioner's Cup	Kaleb Wesson	September 21, 2022 (vs. NorthPort)	December 9, 2022 (vs. Magnolia)	6–7
Governors' Cup	Du'Vaughn Maxwell	January 25, 2023 (vs. TNT)	March 22, 2023 (vs. TNT)	4–8

== Awards ==
Recipient	Honors	Date awarded
Encho Serrano	2022–23 PBA All-Rookie Team	November 19, 2023
Tyler Tio	2022–23 PBA All-Rookie Team	November 19, 2023
