= 2022–23 Terrafirma Dyip season =

Season of a basketball team

- Head coach: Johnedel Cardel
- Owner(s): Terrafirma Realty Development Corporation

Philippine Cup results
- Record: 0–11 (0%)
- Place: 12th
- Playoff finish: Did not qualify

Commissioner's Cup results
- Record: 1–11 (8.3%)
- Place: 13th
- Playoff finish: Did not qualify

Governors' Cup results
- Record: 2–9 (18.2%)
- Place: 11th
- Playoff finish: Did not qualify

Terrafirma Dyip seasons

The 2022–23 Terrafirma Dyip season was the 8th season of the franchise in the Philippine Basketball Association (PBA).

== Key dates ==
- May 15: The PBA season 47 draft was held at the Robinsons Place Manila in Manila.

== Draft picks ==
Round	Pick	Player	Position	Place of birth	College
1	2	Jeremiah Gray	F	USA	Dominican
3	26	Allen Mina	G/F	Philippines	Letran
4	38	Shaq Alanes	G	Philippines	Lyceum
5	46	Sandy Ceñal	F	Philippines	RTU
6	50	Red Cachuela	F	Philippines	Southwestern

== Roster ==
2022–23 Terrafirma Dyip roster
Players
Coaches

Pos.	#	POB	Name	Height	Weight	DOB (YYYY–MM–DD)	From
F	0	(Philippines)	John Grospe (R)	6 ft 4 in (1.93 m)		1994–05–02	José Rizal
G	3	(Philippines)	Juami Tiongson	5 ft 10 in (1.78 m)	175 lb (79 kg)	1991–02–05	Ateneo
G	4	(Philippines)	Gelo Alolino	6 ft 0 in (1.83 m)	185 lb (84 kg)	1994–01–04	National-U
G	5	(Philippines)	Alex Cabagnot (C)	6 ft 0 in (1.83 m)	180 lb (82 kg)	1982–12–08	Hawaiʻi–Hilo
G	6	(Philippines)	Ed Daquioag	6 ft 1 in (1.85 m)	170 lb (77 kg)	1991–08–18	UST
F	7	(Philippines)	Kevin Ferrer	6 ft 5 in (1.96 m)	188 lb (85 kg)	1993–03–26	UST
G	8	(Philippines)	JP Calvo	5 ft 7 in (1.70 m)		1997–09–29	Letran
F	10	(Sweden)	Andreas Cahilig	6 ft 5 in (1.96 m)		1991–01–22	EARIST
F/C	11	(Philippines)	Isaac Go	6 ft 7 in (2.01 m)		1996–06–07	Ateneo
F	13	(Philippines)	Eric Camson	6 ft 4 in (1.93 m)	228 lb (103 kg)	1990–05–12	Adamson
G/F	14	(United States)	Brian Enriquez	6 ft 3 in (1.91 m)	200 lb (91 kg)	1995–10–19	William Woods
F/C	17	(Philippines)	Aldrech Ramos	6 ft 6 in (1.98 m)	190 lb (86 kg)	1988–04–03	Far Eastern
C	18	(Philippines)	Joseph Gabayni	6 ft 5 in (1.96 m)		1994–09–28	Lyceum
F	22	(Philippines)	Javi Gómez de Liaño (R)	6 ft 3 in (1.91 m)	193 lb (88 kg)	1998–06–27	UP Diliman
G/F	29	(Philippines)	Allen Mina (R)	6 ft 3 in (1.91 m)	185 lb (84 kg)	1996–09–22	Letran
G	–	(Philippines)	Bonbon Batiller	6 ft 0 in (1.83 m)		1994–04–23	Letran

Head coach

- (Philippines) Johnedel Cardel

Assistant coach(es)

- (Philippines) Raymond Tiongco (1st assistant)
- (Philippines) Gian Nazario
- (Philippines) James Tolentino
- (Philippines) Joe Lipa (consultant)
- (Philippines) AC Valdenor (consultant)

Team manager

- (Philippines) Ronald Tubid

Legend

- (C) Team captain
- (CI) Commissioner's Cup Import
- (GI) Governors' Cup Import
- (EI) EASL Import
- (DP) Unsigned draft pick
- (FA) Free agent
- (IN) Inactive
- (S) Suspended
- (R) Rookie
- Injured

Roster

== Philippine Cup ==
=== Eliminations ===
==== Standings ====
Pos	Team	W	L	PCT	GB	Qualification
1	San Miguel Beermen	9	2	.818	—	Twice-to-beat in the quarterfinals
2	TNT Tropang Giga	8	3	.727 (Note: Head-to-head quotient:TNT 1.12, Magnolia 0.99, Barangay Ginebra 0.90)	1	Twice-to-beat in the quarterfinals
3	Magnolia Chicken Timplados Hotshots	8	3	.727	1	Best-of-three quarterfinals
4	Barangay Ginebra San Miguel	8	3	.727	1	Best-of-three quarterfinals
5	Meralco Bolts	7	4	.636	2	Best-of-three quarterfinals
6	NLEX Road Warriors	6	5	.545	3	Best-of-three quarterfinals
7	Converge FiberXers	5	6	.455 (Note: Head-to-head record: Converge 1–0 Blackwater)	4	Twice-to-win in the quarterfinals
8	Blackwater Bossing	5	6	.455	4	Twice-to-win in the quarterfinals
9	Rain or Shine Elasto Painters	4	7	.364	5	
10	NorthPort Batang Pier	3	8	.273 (Note: Head-to-head record: NorthPort 1–0 Phoenix)	6	
11	Phoenix Super LPG Fuel Masters	3	8	.273	6	
12	Terrafirma Dyip	0	11	.000	9	

Source: PBA.ph
Rules for classification: 1) winning percentage; 2) if two teams are tied, head-to-head record; if three or more teams are tied, head-to-head goal average (quotient); if tied for 8th, one-game playoff; 3) overall quotient; 4) coin toss

==== Game log ====
2022 PBA Philippine Cup game log
Total: 0–11
June: 0–5

Game	Date	Opponent	Score	High points	High rebounds	High assists	Location Attendance	Record
1	June 8	NLEX	L 102–105	Ramos, Tiongson (18)	Javi Gómez de Liaño (9)	Joshua Munzon (6)	Smart Araneta Coliseum	0–1
2	June 11	NorthPort	L 86–100	Munzon, Tiongson (24)	Munzon, Ramos (8)	Munzon, Ramos, Tiongson (4)	Ynares Center	0–2
3	June 17	Phoenix Super LPG	L 74–97	Joseph Gabayni (16)	Gabayni, Tiongson (9)	JP Calvo (5)	Ynares Center	0–3
4	June 22	Converge	L 84–97	Joseph Gabayni (18)	Joshua Munzon (10)	Joshua Munzon (5)	SM Mall of Asia Arena	0–4
5	June 25	Blackwater	L 70–107	Joshua Munzon (17)	Cahilig, Ramos (11)	Gómez de Liaño, Munzon (3)	Ynares Center	0–5

July: 0–6

Game	Date	Opponent	Score	High points	High rebounds	High assists	Location Attendance	Record
6	July 1	TNT	L 86–114	Joshua Munzon (25)	Eric Camson (9)	JP Calvo (3)	Smart Araneta Coliseum	0–6
7	July 6	Barangay Ginebra	L 82–106	Juami Tiongson (24)	Andreas Cahilig (11)	Joshua Munzon (5)	Smart Araneta Coliseum	0–7
8	July 8	Magnolia	L 83–104	JP Calvo (20)	Andreas Cahilig (5)	Joseph Gabayni (4)	Smart Araneta Coliseum	0–8
9	July 14	San Miguel	L 108–109 (OT)	Eric Camson (20)	Cahilig, Gabayni (10)	JP Calvo (8)	Smart Araneta Coliseum	0–9
10	July 16	Rain or Shine	L 82–97	Aldrech Ramos (21)	Cahilig, Calvo, Ramos (9)	JP Calvo (8)	SM Mall of Asia Arena	0–10
11	July 21	Meralco	L 89–105	Aldrech Ramos (24)	Cahilig, Gabayni, Ramos (6)	Paolo Javelona (6)	Smart Araneta Coliseum	0–11

== Commissioner's Cup ==
=== Eliminations ===
==== Standings ====
Pos	Team	W	L	PCT	GB	Qualification
1	Bay Area Dragons (G)	10	2	.833 (Note: Head-to-head record: Bay Area 1–0 Magnolia)	—	Twice-to-beat in the quarterfinals
2	Magnolia Chicken Timplados Hotshots	10	2	.833	—	Twice-to-beat in the quarterfinals
3	Barangay Ginebra San Miguel	9	3	.750	1	Best-of-three quarterfinals
4	Converge FiberXers	8	4	.667	2	Best-of-three quarterfinals
5	San Miguel Beermen	7	5	.583	3	Best-of-three quarterfinals
6	NorthPort Batang Pier	6	6	.500 (Note: Head-to-head record: NorthPort 1–0 Phoenix)	4	Best-of-three quarterfinals
7	Phoenix Super LPG Fuel Masters	6	6	.500	4	Twice-to-win in the quarterfinals
8	Rain or Shine Elasto Painters	5	7	.417 (Note: Eighth seed playoff: Rain or Shine 110–100 NLEX)	5	Twice-to-win in the quarterfinals
9	NLEX Road Warriors	5	7	.417	5	
10	Meralco Bolts	4	8	.333 (Note: Head-to-head record: Meralco 1–0 TNT)	6	
11	TNT Tropang Giga	4	8	.333	6	
12	Blackwater Bossing	3	9	.250	7	
13	Terrafirma Dyip	1	11	.083	9	

Source: PBA.ph
Rules for classification: 1) winning percentage; 2) if two teams are tied, head-to-head record; if three or more teams are tied, head-to-head goal average (quotient); if tied for 8th, one-game playoff; 3) overall quotient; 4) coin toss
(G) Guests

==== Game log ====
2022–23 PBA Commissioner's Cup game log
Total: 1–11
September: 0–2

Game	Date	Opponent	Score	High points	High rebounds	High assists	Location Attendance	Record
1	September 23, 2022	Converge	L 110–124	Lester Prosper (43)	Lester Prosper (25)	Alex Cabagnot (8)	PhilSports Arena	0–1
2	September 28, 2022	Magnolia	L 92–100	Lester Prosper (41)	Lester Prosper (19)	Alex Cabagnot (7)	SM Mall of Asia Arena	0–2

October: 0–5

Game	Date	Opponent	Score	High points	High rebounds	High assists	Location Attendance	Record
3	October 2, 2022	Rain or Shine	L 94–106	Lester Prosper (20)	Lester Prosper (16)	Alex Cabagnot (9)	Smart Araneta Coliseum	0–3
4	October 7, 2022	Meralco	L 92–105	Lester Prosper (35)	Lester Prosper (18)	Alex Cabagnot (9)	Smart Araneta Coliseum	0–4
5	October 14, 2022	Blackwater	L 86–93	Lester Prosper (18)	Lester Prosper (11)	Alex Cabagnot (4)	Smart Araneta Coliseum	0–5
6	October 21, 2022	Bay Area	L 76–130	Juami Tiongson (21)	Andreas Cahilig (8)	Camson, Gabayni, Prosper, Tiongson (2)	PhilSports Arena	0–6
7	October 28, 2022	Barangay Ginebra	L 90–111	Eric Camson (21)	Lester Prosper (8)	Alex Cabagnot (7)	Smart Araneta Coliseum	0–7

November: 1–4

Game	Date	Opponent	Score	High points	High rebounds	High assists	Location Attendance	Record
8	November 5, 2022	TNT	L 90–121	Lester Prosper (32)	Lester Prosper (15)	Cabagnot, Calvo (5)	Ynares Center	0–8
9	November 12, 2022	NorthPort	L 85–91	Lester Prosper (23)	Lester Prosper (18)	Juami Tiongson (7)	Ynares Center	0–9
10	November 18, 2022	NLEX	W 124–114 (OT)	Lester Prosper (50)	Lester Prosper (19)	Juami Tiongson (9)	Smart Araneta Coliseum	1–9
11	November 23, 2022	San Miguel	L 103–131	Juami Tiongson (28)	Camson, Gabayni (7)	Gelo Alolino (6)	PhilSports Arena	1–10
12	November 26, 2022	Phoenix Super LPG	L 84–135	Joshua Munzon (12)	Eric Camson (12)	Munzon, Tiongson (3)	PhilSports Arena	1–11

== Governors' Cup ==
=== Eliminations ===
==== Standings ====
Pos	Team	W	L	PCT	GB	Qualification
1	TNT Tropang Giga	10	1	.909	—	Twice-to-beat in quarterfinals
2	San Miguel Beermen	9	2	.818	1	Twice-to-beat in quarterfinals
3	Barangay Ginebra San Miguel	8	3	.727	2	Twice-to-beat in quarterfinals
4	Meralco Bolts	7	4	.636 (Note: Head-to-head quotient: Meralco 1.099, Magnolia 1.0741, NLEX 0.86)	3	Twice-to-beat in quarterfinals
5	Magnolia Chicken Timplados Hotshots	7	4	.636	3	Twice-to-win in quarterfinals
6	NLEX Road Warriors	7	4	.636	3	Twice-to-win in quarterfinals
7	Converge FiberXers	6	5	.545	4	Twice-to-win in quarterfinals
8	Phoenix Super LPG Fuel Masters	4	7	.364	6	Twice-to-win in quarterfinals
9	NorthPort Batang Pier	3	8	.273	7	
10	Rain or Shine Elasto Painters	2	9	.182	8	
11	Terrafirma Dyip	2	9	.182	8	
12	Blackwater Bossing	1	10	.091	9	

Source: PBA.ph
Rules for classification: 1) winning percentage; 2) if two teams are tied, head-to-head record; if three or more teams are tied, head-to-head goal average (quotient); if tied for 8th, one-game playoff; 3) overall quotient; 4) coin toss

==== Game log ====
2023 PBA Governors' Cup game log
Total: 2–9
January: 1–1

Game	Date	Opponent	Score	High points	High rebounds	High assists	Location Attendance	Record
1	January 26	Converge	L 115–130	Jordan Williams (46)	Ramos, Williams (6)	Alex Cabagnot (6)	PhilSports Arena	0–1
2	January 28	Meralco	W 96–88	Juami Tiongson (30)	Eric Camson (10)	Alex Cabagnot (7)	Ynares Center	1–1

February: 1–5

Game	Date	Opponent	Score	High points	High rebounds	High assists	Location Attendance	Record
3	February 3	San Miguel	L 102–122	Jordan Williams (30)	Camson, Williams (8)	Alex Cabagnot (6)	Ynares Center	1–2
4	February 9	Blackwater	W 119–106	Jordan Williams (57)	Jordan Williams (11)	Cabagnot, Tiongson, Williams (5)	Smart Araneta Coliseum	2–2
5	February 11	TNT	L 109–131	Jordan Williams (38)	Jordan Williams (10)	Jordan Williams (6)	SM Mall of Asia Arena	2–3
6	February 16	Rain or Shine	L 118–120	Jordan Williams (30)	Jordan Williams (16)	Cabagnot, Calvo, Williams (4)	Smart Araneta Coliseum	2–4
7	February 18	Phoenix Super LPG	L 100–125	Juami Tiongson (27)	Jordan Williams (10)	Alex Cabagnot (6)	Smart Araneta Coliseum	2–5
8	February 22	NorthPort	L 100–115	Jordan Williams (25)	Eric Camson (13)	Alolino, Tiongson (4)	PhilSports Arena	2–6

March: 0–3

Game	Date	Opponent	Score	High points	High rebounds	High assists	Location Attendance	Record
9	March 2	NLEX	L 125–142	Juami Tiongson (38)	Gabayni, Williams (10)	JP Calvo (10)	Smart Araneta Coliseum	2–7
10	March 4	Magnolia	L 115–121 (OT)	Jordan Williams (45)	Joseph Gabayni (10)	Daquioag, Tiongson, Williams (4)	PhilSports Arena	2–8
11	March 8	Barangay Ginebra	L 104–109	Jordan Williams (35)	Jordan Williams (10)	JP Calvo (6)	Ynares Center	2–9

== Transactions ==
=== Free agency ===
==== Signings ====
Player	Date signed	Contract amount	Contract length	Former team
Paolo Javelona	July 16, 2022	Not disclosed	1 year	Purefoods TJ Titans (PBA 3x3)
Juami Tiongson	January 4, 2023	Not disclosed	2 years	Re-signed
Ed Daquioag	January 13, 2023	Not disclosed	1 year	Re-signed
JP Calvo	January 13, 2023	Not disclosed	1 conference	Re-signed

=== Trades ===
==== Pre-season ====
May
May 17, 2022	To Terrafirma Brian Enriquez; Javi Gómez de Liaño	To Barangay Ginebra Jeremiah Gray

==== Commissioner's Cup ====
January
January 12, 2023	To Terrafirma Kevin Ferrer	To NorthPort Joshua Munzon

=== Recruited imports ===
Tournament	Name	Debuted	Last game	Record
Commissioner's Cup	Lester Prosper	September 23, 2022 (vs. Converge)	November 18, 2022 (vs. NLEX)	1–9
Governors' Cup	Jordan Williams	January 26, 2023 (vs. Converge)	March 8, 2023 (vs. Barangay Ginebra)	2–9
