= Michael DiGregorio =

Filipino-Italian basketball player (born 1991)

No. 3 – Blackwater Bossing
- Position: Shooting guard
- League: PBA

Personal information
- Born: December 12, 1991 (age 34) Chicago, Illinois, U.S.
- Listed height: 6 ft 1 in (1.85 m)
- Listed weight: 180 lb (82 kg)

Career information
- College: McKendree University
- PBA draft: 2015: 4th round, 35th overall pick
- Drafted by: Mahindra Enforcer
- Playing career: 2015–present

Career history
- 2015–2017: Mahindra Enforcer/Floodbuster
- 2017–2019: Blackwater Elite
- 2019: TNT KaTropa
- 2020–2022: Alaska Aces
- 2022: Converge FiberXers
- 2023–2024: Blackwater Bossing
- 2025: Pangasinan Heatwaves
- 2026–present: Blackwater Bossing

Michael Vincent DiGregorio (born December 12, 1991) is a Filipino-Italian professional basketball player for the Blackwater Bossing of the Philippine Basketball Association (PBA). He was drafted 35th overall by the Mahindra Enforcer in the 2015 PBA draft.

== Professional career ==
DiGregorio was drafted 35th overall by the Mahindra Enforcer during the fourth round of the 2015 PBA draft.

On February 20, 2017, DiGregorio was signed by the Blackwater Elite. DiGregorio's play in the 2017 Commissioners Cup and 2017 Governors' Cup thrust him into being one of the finalists for the 2017 PBA Most Improved Player award at the annual PBA Leo Awards Night. On September 7, 2017, he signed a two-year contract extension with the team.

On October 19, 2019, he was traded to the TNT KaTropa for Brian Heruela.

On January 6, 2020, DiGregorio, along with a 2023 second-round draft pick, was traded to the Alaska Aces for Simon Enciso.

On May 12, 2022, DiGregorio signed a two-year deal with the Converge FiberXers, the new team that took over the defunct Alaska Aces franchise.

On January 3, 2023, DiGregorio, along with Tyrus Hill and RK Ilagan, was traded to the Blackwater Bossing for Barkley Eboña and a 2022 first-round pick. This is his second stint with the franchise.

On May 8, 2026, DiGregorio signed with Blackwater for his 3rd stint with the team.

== PBA career statistics ==
Legend
GP	Games played	MPG	Minutes per game	FG%	Field-goal percentage
3FG%	3-point field-goal percentage	4P%	4-point field-goal percentage	FT%	Free-throw percentage
RPG	Rebounds per game	APG	Assists per game	SPG	Steals per game
BPG	Blocks per game	PPG	Points per game	127	Career high

As of the end of 2023–24 season

=== Season-by-season averages ===
Year	Team	GP	MPG	FG%	3P%	4P%	FT%	RPG	APG	SPG	BPG	PPG
2015–16	Mahindra	28	17.8	.377	.346	—	.812	1.4	.9	.1	.1	6.2
2016–17	Mahindra	31	25.8	.400	.425	—	.800	1.9	1.5	.5	.0	11.3
2016–17	Blackwater	31	25.8	.400	.425	—	.800	1.9	1.5	.5	.0	11.3
2017–18	Blackwater	34	29.3	.392	.398	—	.855	2.7	2.0	.8	.1	12.4
2019	Blackwater	40	22.4	.399	.395	—	.831	2.4	1.4	.5	—	9.8
2019	TNT	40	22.4	.399	.395	—	.831	2.4	1.4	.5	—	9.8
2020	Alaska	12	24.8	.411	.333	—	.879	3.0	1.3	.3	—	10.8
2021	Alaska	24	23.9	.335	.340	—	.758	2.3	1.8	.3	—	9.3
2022–23	Converge	30	12.8	.352	.231	—	.795	1.1	.6	.2	—	4.9
2022–23	Blackwater	30	12.8	.352	.231	—	.795	1.1	.6	.2	—	4.9
2023–24	Blackwater	12	10.2	.417	.412	—	.941	1.5	.7	.1	—	5.3
2025–26	Blackwater	7	10.1	.292	.250	—	1.000	1.0	.4	—	—	3.6
Career		218	21.3	.384	.371	—	.827	2.0	1.3	.4	.0	8.8

== Personal life ==
He is a nephew of former NBA player Ernie DiGregorio.
