= 2022–23 Meralco Bolts season =

- Head coach: Norman Black; Luigi Trillo (interim)
- Owners: Manila Electric Company (an MVP Group subsidiary)

Philippine Cup results
- Record: 7–4 (63.6%)
- Place: 5th
- Playoff finish: Semifinalist (lost to San Miguel, 3–4)

Commissioner's Cup results
- Record: 4–8 (33.3%)
- Place: 10th
- Playoff finish: Did not qualify

Governors' Cup results
- Record: 7–4 (63.6%)
- Place: 4th
- Playoff finish: Semifinalist (lost to TNT, 1–3)

Meralco Bolts seasons

The 2022–23 Meralco Bolts season was the 12th season of the franchise in the Philippine Basketball Association (PBA).

== Key dates ==
- May 15: The PBA season 47 draft was held at the Robinsons Place Manila in Manila.
- June 6: After Norman Black files leave for personal reasons, Luigi Trillo acted as standing-in head coach and won his first game against the Elasto Painters.
- July 31: The Bolts won against the Gin Kings for the first time in a playoff series.
- August 5: Norman Black returned to the sidelines, as he led the Bolts to tie the semifinals series (1–1) against the San Miguel Beermen.

== Draft picks ==
Round	Pick	Player	Position	Place of birth	College
2	22	Christian Fajarito	C	Philippines	Letran
3	34	JJ Espanola	G	Philippines	UP Diliman
4	42	Andrey Armenion	G	Philippines	UE

== Roster ==
2022–23 Meralco Bolts roster
Players
Coaches

Pos.	#	POB	Name	Height	Weight	DOB (YYYY–MM–DD)	From
G	1	(Philippines)	Aaron Black	6 ft 1 in (1.85 m)	180 lb (82 kg)	1996–12–03	Ateneo
G	4	(Philippines)	Diego Dario	5 ft 8 in (1.73 m)	145 lb (66 kg)	1997–01–06	UP Diliman
G	6	(United States)	Chris Banchero	6 ft 1 in (1.85 m)	175 lb (79 kg)	1989–01–24	Seattle Pacific
F	7	(United States)	Cliff Hodge	6 ft 4 in (1.93 m)	195 lb (88 kg)	1988–02–03	Reedley
G/F	11	(United States)	Chris Newsome	6 ft 2 in (1.88 m)	190 lb (86 kg)	1990–07–25	Ateneo
F	12	(Philippines)	Mac Belo	6 ft 4 in (1.93 m)	185 lb (84 kg)	1993–02–12	Far Eastern
G	15	(United States)	Franky Johnson	6 ft 2 in (1.88 m)	185 lb (84 kg)	1993–08–15	Warner Pacific
G	17	(Philippines)	Anjo Caram	5 ft 7 in (1.70 m)	159 lb (72 kg)	1991–01–14	San Beda
F	19	(Philippines)	Bong Quinto	6 ft 2 in (1.88 m)		1994–12–15	Letran
C	20	(Philippines)	Raymond Almazan (C)	6 ft 8 in (2.03 m)	194 lb (88 kg)	1989–08–02	Letran
F	21	(Philippines)	Reynel Hugnatan	6 ft 4 in (1.93 m)	210 lb (95 kg)	1978–11–03	Manila
F	22	(Philippines)	Allein Maliksi	6 ft 4 in (1.93 m)	180 lb (82 kg)	1987–09–18	UST
F	23	(Philippines)	Alvin Pasaol	6 ft 2 in (1.88 m)	200 lb (91 kg)	1995–05–06	UE
F	24	(Philippines)	Raymar Jose	6 ft 4 in (1.93 m)	210 lb (95 kg)	1992–08–06	Far Eastern
F	27	(Philippines)	Jansen Rios	6 ft 3 in (1.91 m)	185 lb (84 kg)	1991–10–28	Adamson
F/C	32	(United States)	Kyle Pascual	6 ft 6 in (1.98 m)	210 lb (95 kg)	1990–04–13	San Beda
F/C	97	(Philippines)	Nonoy Baclao	6 ft 5 in (1.96 m)	190 lb (86 kg)	1987–06–15	Ateneo

Head coach

- (United States) Norman Black

Assistant coach(es)

- (Philippines) Ronnie Magsanoc (1st assistant)
- (Philippines) Gene Afable
- (Philippines) Patrick Fran
- (Philippines) Luigi Trillo
- (Serbia) Nenad Vučinić (consultant)

Team manager

- (Philippines) Paolo Trillo

Legend

- (C) Team captain
- (CI) Commissioner's Cup Import
- (GI) Governors' Cup Import
- (EI) EASL Import
- (DP) Unsigned draft pick
- (FA) Free agent
- (IN) Inactive
- (S) Suspended
- (R) Rookie
- Injured

Roster

== Philippine Cup ==
=== Eliminations ===
==== Standings ====
Pos	Team	W	L	PCT	GB	Qualification
1	San Miguel Beermen	9	2	.818	—	Twice-to-beat in the quarterfinals
2	TNT Tropang Giga	8	3	.727 (Note: Head-to-head quotient:TNT 1.12, Magnolia 0.99, Barangay Ginebra 0.90)	1	Twice-to-beat in the quarterfinals
3	Magnolia Chicken Timplados Hotshots	8	3	.727	1	Best-of-three quarterfinals
4	Barangay Ginebra San Miguel	8	3	.727	1	Best-of-three quarterfinals
5	Meralco Bolts	7	4	.636	2	Best-of-three quarterfinals
6	NLEX Road Warriors	6	5	.545	3	Best-of-three quarterfinals
7	Converge FiberXers	5	6	.455 (Note: Head-to-head record: Converge 1–0 Blackwater)	4	Twice-to-win in the quarterfinals
8	Blackwater Bossing	5	6	.455	4	Twice-to-win in the quarterfinals
9	Rain or Shine Elasto Painters	4	7	.364	5	
10	NorthPort Batang Pier	3	8	.273 (Note: Head-to-head record: NorthPort 1–0 Phoenix)	6	
11	Phoenix Super LPG Fuel Masters	3	8	.273	6	
12	Terrafirma Dyip	0	11	.000	9	

Source: PBA.ph
Rules for classification: 1) winning percentage; 2) if two teams are tied, head-to-head record; if three or more teams are tied, head-to-head goal average (quotient); if tied for 8th, one-game playoff; 3) overall quotient; 4) coin toss

==== Game log ====
2022 PBA Philippine Cup game log
Total: 7–4
June: 3–3

Game	Date	Opponent	Score	High points	High rebounds	High assists	Location Attendance	Record
1	June 11	Phoenix Super LPG	W 109–98	Chris Newsome (21)	Cliff Hodge (10)	Chris Newsome (7)	Ynares Center	1–0
2	June 16	Converge	W 90–74	Aaron Black (25)	Raymond Almazan (15)	Black, Newsome (5)	Ynares Center	2–0
3	June 18	TNT	L 71–78	Allein Maliksi (20)	Cliff Hodge (9)	Bong Quinto (4)	Ynares Center	2–1
4	June 23	NorthPort	W 97–87	Aaron Black (20)	Raymar Jose (13)	Black, Newsome (7)	Ynares Center	3–1
5	June 25	NLEX	L 75–90	Chris Newsome (17)	Raymar Jose (9)	Banchero, Newsome (3)	Ynares Center	3–2
6	June 30	Blackwater	L 89–90	Chris Newsome (23)	Cliff Hodge (7)	Bong Quinto (8)	Smart Araneta Coliseum	3–3

July: 4–1

Game	Date	Opponent	Score	High points	High rebounds	High assists	Location Attendance	Record
7	July 6	Rain or Shine	W 77–73	Aaron Black (20)	Raymond Almazan (15)	Aaron Black (6)	Smart Araneta Coliseum	4–3
8	July 13	Barangay Ginebra	W 90–73	Chris Newsome (19)	Raymond Almazan (15)	Black, Quinto (5)	Smart Araneta Coliseum	5–3
9	July 15	Magnolia	L 88–97 (OT)	Chris Newsome (24)	Raymond Almazan (18)	Aaron Black (7)	Ynares Center	5–4
10	July 17	San Miguel	W 89–86	Allein Maliksi (18)	Cliff Hodge (11)	Black, Hodge, Newsome (5)	Smart Araneta Coliseum	6–4
11	July 21	Terrafirma	W 105–89	Chris Newsome (19)	Raymond Almazan (9)	Banchero, Black, Newsome (5)	Smart Araneta Coliseum	7–4

=== Playoffs ===
==== Bracket ====
Quarterfinals
(#1 twice-to-beat)
1	San Miguel	123
8	Blackwater	93
(Best-of-3)
4	Barangay Ginebra	1
5	Meralco	2
(#2 twice-to-beat)
2	TNT	116
7	Converge	95
(Best-of-3)
3	Magnolia	2
6	NLEX	1

Semifinals (Best-of-7)
1	San Miguel	4
5	Meralco	3
2	TNT	4
3	Magnolia	2

Finals (Best-of-7)
1	San Miguel	4
2	TNT	3

==== Game log ====
2022 PBA Philippine Cup playoffs game log
Total: 5–5
Quarterfinals: 2–1

Game	Date	Opponent	Score	High points	High rebounds	High assists	Location Attendance	Series
1	July 24	Barangay Ginebra	W 93–82	Aaron Black (25)	Newsome, Pascual (9)	Chris Newsome (6)	Smart Araneta Coliseum	1–0
2	July 29	Barangay Ginebra	L 87–94	Cliff Hodge (25)	Raymond Almazan (10)	Chris Newsome (6)	Filoil EcoOil Centre	1–1
3	July 31	Barangay Ginebra	W 106–104	Chris Newsome (21)	Cliff Hodge (18)	Chris Newsome (12)	SM Mall of Asia Arena	2–1

Semifinals: 3–4

Game	Date	Opponent	Score	High points	High rebounds	High assists	Location Attendance	Series
1	August 3	San Miguel	L 97–121	Chris Banchero (17)	Almazan, Jose, Newsome, Quinto (6)	Chris Banchero (5)	Smart Araneta Coliseum	0–1
2	August 5	San Miguel	W 99–88	Cliff Hodge (17)	Cliff Hodge (14)	Chris Newsome (5)	Smart Araneta Coliseum	1–1
3	August 7	San Miguel	L 91–96	Chris Newsome (16)	Cliff Hodge (13)	Chris Newsome (6)	Smart Araneta Coliseum	1–2
4	August 10	San Miguel	W 111–97	Aaron Black (21)	Black, Hodge (7)	Aaron Black (7)	Smart Araneta Coliseum	2–2
5	August 12	San Miguel	L 78–89	Chris Newsome (24)	Aaron Black (11)	Black, Newsome (4)	Smart Araneta Coliseum	2–3
6	August 14	San Miguel	W 96–92	Chris Newsome (19)	Cliff Hodge (12)	Aaron Black (6)	Smart Araneta Coliseum; 9,439	3–3
7	August 17	San Miguel	L 89–100	Cliff Hodge (23)	Cliff Hodge (8)	Banchero, Hodge, Newsome (4)	Smart Araneta Coliseum	3–4

== Commissioner's Cup ==
=== Eliminations ===
==== Standings ====
Pos	Team	W	L	PCT	GB	Qualification
1	Bay Area Dragons (G)	10	2	.833 (Note: Head-to-head record: Bay Area 1–0 Magnolia)	—	Twice-to-beat in the quarterfinals
2	Magnolia Chicken Timplados Hotshots	10	2	.833	—	Twice-to-beat in the quarterfinals
3	Barangay Ginebra San Miguel	9	3	.750	1	Best-of-three quarterfinals
4	Converge FiberXers	8	4	.667	2	Best-of-three quarterfinals
5	San Miguel Beermen	7	5	.583	3	Best-of-three quarterfinals
6	NorthPort Batang Pier	6	6	.500 (Note: Head-to-head record: NorthPort 1–0 Phoenix)	4	Best-of-three quarterfinals
7	Phoenix Super LPG Fuel Masters	6	6	.500	4	Twice-to-win in the quarterfinals
8	Rain or Shine Elasto Painters	5	7	.417 (Note: Eighth seed playoff: Rain or Shine 110–100 NLEX)	5	Twice-to-win in the quarterfinals
9	NLEX Road Warriors	5	7	.417	5	
10	Meralco Bolts	4	8	.333 (Note: Head-to-head record: Meralco 1–0 TNT)	6	
11	TNT Tropang Giga	4	8	.333	6	
12	Blackwater Bossing	3	9	.250	7	
13	Terrafirma Dyip	1	11	.083	9	

Source: PBA.ph
Rules for classification: 1) winning percentage; 2) if two teams are tied, head-to-head record; if three or more teams are tied, head-to-head goal average (quotient); if tied for 8th, one-game playoff; 3) overall quotient; 4) coin toss
(G) Guests

==== Game log ====
2022–23 PBA Commissioner's Cup game log
Total: 4–8
September: 0–1

Game	Date	Opponent	Score	High points	High rebounds	High assists	Location Attendance	Record
1	September 30, 2022	NorthPort	L 95–101 (OT)	Johnny O'Bryant III (30)	Johnny O'Bryant III (22)	Aaron Black (7)	Smart Araneta Coliseum	0–1

October: 1–4

Game	Date	Opponent	Score	High points	High rebounds	High assists	Location Attendance	Record
2	October 2, 2022	Barangay Ginebra	L 91–99	Johnny O'Bryant III (31)	Johnny O'Bryant III (16)	Aaron Black (9)	Smart Araneta Coliseum	0–2
3	October 7, 2022	Terrafirma	W 105–92	Johnny O'Bryant III (31)	Johnny O'Bryant III (11)	Chris Banchero (7)	Smart Araneta Coliseum	1–2
4	October 15, 2022	Converge	L 99–106	Johnny O'Bryant III (27)	Johnny O'Bryant III (15)	Aaron Black (6)	Smart Araneta Coliseum	1–3
5	October 19, 2022	Phoenix Super LPG	L 82–89	Bong Quinto (22)	Johnny O'Bryant III (16)	Johnny O'Bryant III (9)	PhilSports Arena	1–4
6	October 22, 2022	Rain or Shine	L 96–113	Johnny O'Bryant III (30)	Raymond Almazan (12)	Black, O'Bryant (5)	PhilSports Arena	1–5

November: 3–2

Game	Date	Opponent	Score	High points	High rebounds	High assists	Location Attendance	Record
7	November 4, 2022	Bay Area	W 92–89	K. J. McDaniels (31)	Raymond Almazan (16)	Banchero, Black (2)	Smart Araneta Coliseum	2–5
8	November 11, 2022	Blackwater	W 102–98 (OT)	K. J. McDaniels (26)	K. J. McDaniels (16)	K. J. McDaniels (5)	Ynares Center	3–5
9	November 16, 2022	TNT	W 97–91	K. J. McDaniels (26)	K. J. McDaniels (15)	Aaron Black (6)	Smart Araneta Coliseum	4–5
10	November 27, 2022	Magnolia	L 96–108	K. J. McDaniels (32)	K. J. McDaniels (9)	Chris Banchero (5)	PhilSports Arena	4–6
11	November 30, 2022	NLEX	L 81–92	K. J. McDaniels (22)	Hodge, McDaniels (9)	Aaron Black (4)	PhilSports Arena	4–7

December: 0–1

Game	Date	Opponent	Score	High points	High rebounds	High assists	Location Attendance	Record
12	December 2, 2022	San Miguel	L 108–113	K. J. McDaniels (27)	Raymar Jose (17)	Anjo Caram (6)	PhilSports Arena	4–8

== Governors' Cup ==
=== Eliminations ===
==== Standings ====
Pos	Team	W	L	PCT	GB	Qualification
1	TNT Tropang Giga	10	1	.909	—	Twice-to-beat in quarterfinals
2	San Miguel Beermen	9	2	.818	1	Twice-to-beat in quarterfinals
3	Barangay Ginebra San Miguel	8	3	.727	2	Twice-to-beat in quarterfinals
4	Meralco Bolts	7	4	.636 (Note: Head-to-head quotient: Meralco 1.099, Magnolia 1.0741, NLEX 0.86)	3	Twice-to-beat in quarterfinals
5	Magnolia Chicken Timplados Hotshots	7	4	.636	3	Twice-to-win in quarterfinals
6	NLEX Road Warriors	7	4	.636	3	Twice-to-win in quarterfinals
7	Converge FiberXers	6	5	.545	4	Twice-to-win in quarterfinals
8	Phoenix Super LPG Fuel Masters	4	7	.364	6	Twice-to-win in quarterfinals
9	NorthPort Batang Pier	3	8	.273	7	
10	Rain or Shine Elasto Painters	2	9	.182	8	
11	Terrafirma Dyip	2	9	.182	8	
12	Blackwater Bossing	1	10	.091	9	

Source: PBA.ph
Rules for classification: 1) winning percentage; 2) if two teams are tied, head-to-head record; if three or more teams are tied, head-to-head goal average (quotient); if tied for 8th, one-game playoff; 3) overall quotient; 4) coin toss

==== Game log ====
2023 PBA Governors' Cup game log
Total: 7–4
January: 2–1

Game	Date	Opponent	Score	High points	High rebounds	High assists	Location Attendance	Record
1	January 22	Rain or Shine	W 105–87	K. J. McDaniels (27)	K. J. McDaniels (23)	Chris Newsome (6)	PhilSports Arena	1–0
2	January 26	NorthPort	W 107–102	K. J. McDaniels (32)	K. J. McDaniels (22)	Chris Newsome (6)	PhilSports Arena	2–0
3	January 28	Terrafirma	L 88–96	K. J. McDaniels (29)	K. J. McDaniels (19)	Black, McDaniels (4)	Ynares Center	2–1

February: 3–2

Game	Date	Opponent	Score	High points	High rebounds	High assists	Location Attendance	Record
4	February 4	Blackwater	W 125–99	Allein Maliksi (30)	K. J. McDaniels (15)	K. J. McDaniels (8)	Ynares Center	3–1
5	February 9	San Miguel	L 86–94	McDaniels, Newsome (18)	K. J. McDaniels (13)	Chris Newsome (5)	Smart Araneta Coliseum	3–2
6	February 17	TNT	L 104–111	K. J. McDaniels (26)	K. J. McDaniels (15)	Chris Newsome (4)	Smart Araneta Coliseum	3–3
7	February 23	NLEX	W 114–98	K. J. McDaniels (31)	K. J. McDaniels (21)	Chris Newsome (8)	PhilSports Arena	4–3
8	February 26	Magnolia	W 86–84	K. J. McDaniels (19)	K. J. McDaniels (15)	Aaron Black (4)	Smart Araneta Coliseum	5–3

March: 2–1

Game	Date	Opponent	Score	High points	High rebounds	High assists	Location Attendance	Record
9	March 1	Barangay Ginebra	L 107–112	K. J. McDaniels (28)	K. J. McDaniels (11)	Banchero, Black (5)	Smart Araneta Coliseum	5–4
10	March 3	Converge	W 132–129 (OT)	K. J. McDaniels (33)	K. J. McDaniels (12)	Black, Hodge (5)	Smart Araneta Coliseum	6–4
11	March 5	Phoenix Super LPG	W 92–86	K. J. McDaniels (19)	K. J. McDaniels (16)	Chris Newsome (9)	PhilSports Arena	7–4

=== Playoffs ===
==== Bracket ====
Quarterfinals (Top 4 twice-to-beat)
1	TNT	132
8	Phoenix Super LPG	105
4	Meralco	113*
5	Magnolia	107
2	San Miguel	121
7	Converge	105
3	Barangay Ginebra	127
6	NLEX	93

Semifinals (Best-of-5)
1	TNT	3
4	Meralco	1
2	San Miguel	0
3	Barangay Ginebra	3

Finals (Best-of-7)
1	TNT	4
3	Barangay Ginebra	2

*Game went into overtime

==== Game log ====
2023 PBA Governors' Cup playoffs game log
Total: 2–3
Quarterfinals: 1–0

Game	Date	Opponent	Score	High points	High rebounds	High assists	Location Attendance	Series
1	March 22	Magnolia	W 113–107 (OT)	Chris Newsome (33)	Aaron Black (12)	Chris Newsome (7)	Smart Araneta Coliseum	1–0

Semifinals: 1–3

Game	Date	Opponent	Score	High points	High rebounds	High assists	Location Attendance	Series
1	March 24	TNT	L 80–110	K. J. McDaniels (12)	K. J. McDaniels (14)	Aaron Black (5)	Ynares Center	0–1
2	March 26	TNT	W 124–117 (OT)	K. J. McDaniels (39)	K. J. McDaniels (20)	Aaron Black (10)	Ynares Center	1–1
3	March 29	TNT	L 80–99	K. J. McDaniels (30)	Aaron Black (11)	Chris Newsome (5)	Smart Araneta Coliseum	1–2
4	March 31	TNT	L 92–107	K. J. McDaniels (37)	K. J. McDaniels (12)	Aaron Black (7)	Smart Araneta Coliseum	1–3

== Transactions ==
=== Free agency ===
==== Signings ====
Player	Date signed	Contract amount	Contract length	Former team
Aaron Black	May 24, 2022	Not disclosed	2 years	Re-signed
Kyle Pascual	May 26, 2022	Not disclosed	2 years	Terrafirma Dyip
Jansen Rios	January 19, 2023	Not disclosed	1 year	Phoenix Super LPG Fuel Masters
Diego Dario	January 24, 2023	Not disclosed	1 conference	Davao Occidental Tigers (PSL)

=== Recruited imports ===
Tournament	Name	Debuted	Last game	Record
Commissioner's Cup	Johnny O'Bryant III	September 30, 2022 (vs. NorthPort)	October 22, 2022 (vs. Rain or Shine)	1–5
Commissioner's Cup	K. J. McDaniels	November 4, 2022 (vs. Bay Area)	December 2, 2022 (vs. San Miguel)	3–3
Governors' Cup	K. J. McDaniels	January 22, 2023 (vs. Rain or Shine)	March 31, 2023 (vs. TNT)	9–7

== Awards ==
Recipient	Honors	Date awarded
Cliff Hodge	2022–23 PBA All-Defensive Team	November 5, 2023
Chris Newsome	2022–23 PBA All-Defensive Team	November 5, 2023
