= 2022–23 Blackwater Bossing season =

- Head coach: Ariel Vanguardia (interim)
- Owners: Ever Bilena Cosmetics, Inc.

Philippine Cup results
- Record: 5–6 (45.5%)
- Place: 8th
- Playoff finish: Quarterfinalist (lost to San Miguel with twice-to-win disadvantage)

Commissioner's Cup results
- Record: 3–9 (25%)
- Place: 12th
- Playoff finish: Did not qualify

Governors' Cup results
- Record: 1–10 (9.1%)
- Place: 12th
- Playoff finish: Did not qualify

Blackwater Bossing seasons

The 2022–23 Blackwater Bossing season was the 8th season of the franchise in the Philippine Basketball Association (PBA).

== Key dates ==
- May 15: The PBA season 47 draft was held at the Robinsons Place Manila in Manila.

== Draft picks ==
Round	Pick	Player	Position	Place of birth	College
1	1	Brandon Ganuelas-Rosser	C	USA	UC Riverside
1	9	Kurt Lojera	G	Philippines	De La Salle
1	11	Mark Dyke	F	Philippines	De La Salle
2	13	Ato Ular	F	Philippines	Letran
3	25	Daryl Pascual	C	Philippines	Letran
4	37	Earvin Lacsamana	C	Canada	Champlain
5	45	Arthur Navasero	G	Philippines	Centennial

== Roster ==
2022–23 Blackwater Bossing roster
Players
Coaches

Pos.	#	POB	Name	Height	Weight	DOB (YYYY–MM–DD)	From
G	0	(Philippines)	RK Ilagan	5 ft 7 in (1.70 m)	150 lb (68 kg)	1997–04–03	San Sebastian
G	1	(United States)	Michael DiGregorio	6 ft 1 in (1.85 m)	185 lb (84 kg)	1991–12–12	McKendree
G/F	4	(Philippines)	Rey Suerte	6 ft 3 in (1.91 m)	175 lb (79 kg)	1994–10–04	UE
F	5	(Philippines)	Ato Ular (R)	6 ft 4 in (1.93 m)	196 lb (89 kg)	1995–05–04	Letran
G	6	(Philippines)	JVee Casio (C)	5 ft 10 in (1.78 m)	175 lb (79 kg)	1986–09–01	De La Salle
F	7	(Philippines)	Mark Dyke (R)	6 ft 3 in (1.91 m)	209 lb (95 kg)	1997–09–28	De La Salle
G	9	(Philippines)	Baser Amer	6 ft 0 in (1.83 m)	170 lb (77 kg)	1992–09–29	San Beda
G	10	(United States)	Rashawn McCarthy	6 ft 0 in (1.83 m)	175 lb (79 kg)	1989–09–10	SUNY–Old Westbury
F	15	(Philippines)	James Sena	6 ft 5 in (1.96 m)	225 lb (102 kg)	1988–08–31	José Rizal
F	18	(Philippines)	Troy Rosario	6 ft 7 in (2.01 m)	198 lb (90 kg)	1992–01–20	National-U
F	21	(United States)	Tyrus Hill (R)	6 ft 5 in (1.96 m)	185 lb (84 kg)	1996–03–20	De La Salle
F	23	(Philippines)	Richard Escoto	6 ft 3 in (1.91 m)	204 lb (93 kg)	1997–03–21	Far Eastern
G	28	(Philippines)	Mike Ayonayon	6 ft 0 in (1.83 m)	170 lb (77 kg)	1992–12–08	Philippine Christian
F	31	(Philippines)	Rey Publico	6 ft 4 in (1.93 m)		1992–11–29	Letran
G/F	33	(United States)	Joshua Torralba	6 ft 2 in (1.88 m)	204 lb (93 kg)	1993–09–09	De La Salle
C	55	(Kuwait)	Yousef Taha	6 ft 8 in (2.03 m)	231 lb (105 kg)	1988–07–08	Mapúa
F	77	(Philippines)	Gab Banal	6 ft 3 in (1.91 m)	200 lb (91 kg)	1990–09–09	Mapúa
G	–	(United States)	Trevis Jackson	5 ft 11 in (1.80 m)	170 lb (77 kg)	1995–09–14	Sacramento State

Head coach

- (Philippines) Ariel Vanguardia

Assistant coach(es)

- (Philippines) Justino Pinat (1st assistant)
- (Philippines) Junjie Ablan
- (Philippines) Aries Dimaunahan
- (Philippines) Da Olan

Team manager

- (Philippines) Johnson Martinez
- (Philippines) Patrick Aquino (assistant)

Legend

- (C) Team captain
- (CI) Commissioner's Cup Import
- (GI) Governors' Cup Import
- (EI) EASL Import
- (DP) Unsigned draft pick
- (FA) Free agent
- (IN) Inactive
- (S) Suspended
- (R) Rookie
- Injured

Roster

== Philippine Cup ==
=== Eliminations ===
==== Standings ====
Pos	Team	W	L	PCT	GB	Qualification
1	San Miguel Beermen	9	2	.818	—	Twice-to-beat in the quarterfinals
2	TNT Tropang Giga	8	3	.727 (Note: Head-to-head quotient:TNT 1.12, Magnolia 0.99, Barangay Ginebra 0.90)	1	Twice-to-beat in the quarterfinals
3	Magnolia Chicken Timplados Hotshots	8	3	.727	1	Best-of-three quarterfinals
4	Barangay Ginebra San Miguel	8	3	.727	1	Best-of-three quarterfinals
5	Meralco Bolts	7	4	.636	2	Best-of-three quarterfinals
6	NLEX Road Warriors	6	5	.545	3	Best-of-three quarterfinals
7	Converge FiberXers	5	6	.455 (Note: Head-to-head record: Converge 1–0 Blackwater)	4	Twice-to-win in the quarterfinals
8	Blackwater Bossing	5	6	.455	4	Twice-to-win in the quarterfinals
9	Rain or Shine Elasto Painters	4	7	.364	5	
10	NorthPort Batang Pier	3	8	.273 (Note: Head-to-head record: NorthPort 1–0 Phoenix)	6	
11	Phoenix Super LPG Fuel Masters	3	8	.273	6	
12	Terrafirma Dyip	0	11	.000	9	

Source: PBA.ph
Rules for classification: 1) winning percentage; 2) if two teams are tied, head-to-head record; if three or more teams are tied, head-to-head goal average (quotient); if tied for 8th, one-game playoff; 3) overall quotient; 4) coin toss

==== Game log ====
2022 PBA Philippine Cup game log
Total: 5–6
June: 4–1

Game	Date	Opponent	Score	High points	High rebounds	High assists	Location Attendance	Record
1	June 9	TNT	W 85–78	JVee Casio (22)	Yousef Taha (12)	Yousef Taha (5)	Ynares Center	1–0
2	June 12	Barangay Ginebra	L 82–85	Rey Suerte (15)	Yousef Taha (13)	Baser Amer (4)	Ynares Center	1–1
3	June 18	NorthPort	W 97–90	JVee Casio (22)	McCarthy, Taha (7)	Rashawn McCarthy (10)	Ynares Center	2–1
4	June 25	Terrafirma	W 107–70	Ato Ular (16)	Yousef Taha (14)	Amer, Melton (5)	Ynares Center	3–1
5	June 30	Meralco	W 90–89	Casio, Ular (19)	Ato Ular (15)	Rashawn McCarthy (7)	Smart Araneta Coliseum	4–1

July: 1–5

Game	Date	Opponent	Score	High points	High rebounds	High assists	Location Attendance	Record
6	July 8	Phoenix Super LPG	W 91–89	Ato Ular (34)	Ato Ular (10)	Yousef Taha (7)	Smart Araneta Coliseum	5–1
7	July 10	San Miguel	L 107–110 (OT)	Rashawn McCarthy (22)	Ato Ular (8)	Amer, Melton (5)	Smart Araneta Coliseum; 10,308	5–2
8	July 13	Rain or Shine	L 90–107	Brandon Ganuelas-Rosser (19)	Ato Ular (9)	Casio, McCarthy (5)	Smart Araneta Coliseum	5–3
9	July 15	NLEX	L 68–98	Yousef Taha (9)	Ato Ular (11)	Ayonayon, Melton (4)	Ynares Center	5–4
10	July 20	Converge	L 90–92	Brandon Ganuelas-Rosser (20)	Brandon Ganuelas-Rosser (12)	Amer, Casio, Eboña (3)	Smart Araneta Coliseum	5–5
11	July 22	Magnolia	L 66–75	Brandon Ganuelas-Rosser (12)	Ganuelas-Rosser, Ular (7)	JVee Casio (6)	Smart Araneta Coliseum	5–6

=== Playoffs ===
==== Bracket ====
Quarterfinals
(#1 twice-to-beat)
1	San Miguel	123
8	Blackwater	93
(Best-of-3)
4	Barangay Ginebra	1
5	Meralco	2
(#2 twice-to-beat)
2	TNT	116
7	Converge	95
(Best-of-3)
3	Magnolia	2
6	NLEX	1

Semifinals (Best-of-7)
1	San Miguel	4
5	Meralco	3
2	TNT	4
3	Magnolia	2

Finals (Best-of-7)
1	San Miguel	4
2	TNT	3

==== Game log ====
2022 PBA Philippine Cup playoffs game log
Total: 0–1
Quarterfinals: 0–1

Game	Date	Opponent	Score	High points	High rebounds	High assists	Location Attendance	Series
1	July 27	San Miguel	L 93–123	Ato Ular (15)	Ato Ular (11)	Baser Amer (5)	Smart Araneta Coliseum	0–1

== Commissioner's Cup ==
=== Eliminations ===
==== Standings ====
Pos	Team	W	L	PCT	GB	Qualification
1	Bay Area Dragons (G)	10	2	.833 (Note: Head-to-head record: Bay Area 1–0 Magnolia)	—	Twice-to-beat in the quarterfinals
2	Magnolia Chicken Timplados Hotshots	10	2	.833	—	Twice-to-beat in the quarterfinals
3	Barangay Ginebra San Miguel	9	3	.750	1	Best-of-three quarterfinals
4	Converge FiberXers	8	4	.667	2	Best-of-three quarterfinals
5	San Miguel Beermen	7	5	.583	3	Best-of-three quarterfinals
6	NorthPort Batang Pier	6	6	.500 (Note: Head-to-head record: NorthPort 1–0 Phoenix)	4	Best-of-three quarterfinals
7	Phoenix Super LPG Fuel Masters	6	6	.500	4	Twice-to-win in the quarterfinals
8	Rain or Shine Elasto Painters	5	7	.417 (Note: Eighth seed playoff: Rain or Shine 110–100 NLEX)	5	Twice-to-win in the quarterfinals
9	NLEX Road Warriors	5	7	.417	5	
10	Meralco Bolts	4	8	.333 (Note: Head-to-head record: Meralco 1–0 TNT)	6	
11	TNT Tropang Giga	4	8	.333	6	
12	Blackwater Bossing	3	9	.250	7	
13	Terrafirma Dyip	1	11	.083	9	

Source: PBA.ph
Rules for classification: 1) winning percentage; 2) if two teams are tied, head-to-head record; if three or more teams are tied, head-to-head goal average (quotient); if tied for 8th, one-game playoff; 3) overall quotient; 4) coin toss
(G) Guests

==== Game log ====
2022–23 PBA Commissioner's Cup game log
Total: 3–9
September: 1–2

Game	Date	Opponent	Score	High points	High rebounds	High assists	Location Attendance	Record
1	September 21, 2022	Bay Area	L 87–133	Ato Ular (13)	Ato Ular (14)	Cameron Krutwig (8)	SM Mall of Asia Arena	0–1
2	September 24, 2022	Phoenix Super LPG	W 97–85	Baser Amer (24)	Cameron Krutwig (16)	Cameron Krutwig (7)	SM Mall of Asia Arena	1–1
3	September 30, 2022	NLEX	L 102–105	Baser Amer (26)	Cameron Krutwig (14)	Cameron Krutwig (8)	Smart Araneta Coliseum	1–2

October: 2–3

Game	Date	Opponent	Score	High points	High rebounds	High assists	Location Attendance	Record
4	October 5, 2022	San Miguel	W 109–106	Cameron Krutwig (20)	Cameron Krutwig (18)	Cameron Krutwig (10)	Smart Araneta Coliseum	2–2
5	October 12, 2022	NorthPort	L 83–87	Cameron Krutwig (28)	Cameron Krutwig (17)	Banal, Krutwig (4)	Smart Araneta Coliseum	2–3
6	October 14, 2022	Terrafirma	W 93–86	Cameron Krutwig (29)	Cameron Krutwig (24)	Amer, McCarthy (4)	Smart Araneta Coliseum	3–3
7	October 22, 2022	TNT	L 98–108	Cameron Krutwig (25)	Ato Ular (13)	Ato Ular (6)	PhilSports Arena	3–4
8	October 30, 2022	Converge	L 71–77	Cameron Krutwig (16)	Cameron Krutwig (15)	Cameron Krutwig (4)	Ynares Center	3–5

November: 0–4

Game	Date	Opponent	Score	High points	High rebounds	High assists	Location Attendance	Record
9	November 6, 2022	Magnolia	L 69–91	Ato Ular (14)	Cameron Krutwig (16)	Cameron Krutwig (4)	Smart Araneta Coliseum; 10,149	3–6
10	November 11, 2022	Meralco	L 98–102 (OT)	Cameron Krutwig (23)	Cameron Krutwig (19)	Cameron Krutwig (6)	Ynares Center	3–7
11	November 18, 2022	Barangay Ginebra	L 84–98	Ato Ular (20)	Cameron Krutwig (15)	Cameron Krutwig (6)	Smart Araneta Coliseum	3–8
12	November 25, 2022	Rain or Shine	L 97–116	Cameron Krutwig (23)	Cameron Krutwig (17)	Cameron Krutwig (4)	PhilSports Arena	3–9

== Governors' Cup ==
=== Eliminations ===
==== Standings ====
Pos	Team	W	L	PCT	GB	Qualification
1	TNT Tropang Giga	10	1	.909	—	Twice-to-beat in quarterfinals
2	San Miguel Beermen	9	2	.818	1	Twice-to-beat in quarterfinals
3	Barangay Ginebra San Miguel	8	3	.727	2	Twice-to-beat in quarterfinals
4	Meralco Bolts	7	4	.636 (Note: Head-to-head quotient: Meralco 1.10, Magnolia 1.07, NLEX 0.86)	3	Twice-to-beat in quarterfinals
5	Magnolia Chicken Timplados Hotshots	7	4	.636	3	Twice-to-win in quarterfinals
6	NLEX Road Warriors	7	4	.636	3	Twice-to-win in quarterfinals
7	Converge FiberXers	6	5	.545	4	Twice-to-win in quarterfinals
8	Phoenix Super LPG Fuel Masters	4	7	.364	6	Twice-to-win in quarterfinals
9	NorthPort Batang Pier	3	8	.273	7	
10	Rain or Shine Elasto Painters	2	9	.182 (Note: Head-to-head record: Rain or Shine 1–0 Terrafirma)	8	
11	Terrafirma Dyip	2	9	.182	8	
12	Blackwater Bossing	1	10	.091	9	

Source: PBA.ph
Rules for classification: 1) winning percentage; 2) if two teams are tied, head-to-head record; if three or more teams are tied, head-to-head goal average (quotient); if tied for 8th, one-game playoff; 3) overall quotient; 4) coin toss

==== Game log ====
2023 PBA Governors' Cup game log
Total: 1–10
January: 1–1

Game	Date	Opponent	Score	High points	High rebounds	High assists	Location Attendance	Record
1	January 25	NLEX	L 102–124	Shawn Glover (26)	Ato Ular (11)	Rashawn McCarthy (10)	Smart Araneta Coliseum	0–1
2	January 27	Phoenix Super LPG	W 108–105	Shawn Glover (31)	Glover, Taha (13)	Rashawn McCarthy (7)	Ynares Center	1–1

February: 0–8

Game	Date	Opponent	Score	High points	High rebounds	High assists	Location Attendance	Record
3	February 1	San Miguel	L 86–105	Shawn Glover (16)	Shawn Glover (12)	RK Ilagan (6)	PhilSports Arena	1–2
4	February 4	Meralco	L 99–125	Shawn Glover (20)	Glover, Ilagan (7)	Rashawn McCarthy (8)	Ynares Center	1–3
5	February 9	Terrafirma	L 106–119	Troy Williams (55)	Troy Williams (14)	Troy Williams (5)	Smart Araneta Coliseum	1–4
6	February 12	Rain or Shine	L 117–122	Troy Williams (40)	Ular, Williams (13)	Baser Amer (7)	SM Mall of Asia Arena; 11,212	1–5
7	February 15	TNT	L 116–138	Troy Williams (22)	Taha, Williams (8)	Troy Williams (6)	SM Mall of Asia Arena	1–6
8	February 19	Barangay Ginebra	L 93–119	Shawn Glover (14)	Glover, Ular (10)	Glover, Ilagan, McCarthy (3)	PhilSports Arena	1–7
9	February 23	Converge	L 90–98	Troy Rosario (20)	Shawn Glover (10)	Shawn Glover (5)	PhilSports Arena	1–8
10	February 25	NorthPort	L 104–110	Shawn Glover (20)	Shawn Glover (9)	RK Ilagan (7)	Smart Araneta Coliseum	1–9

March: 0–1

Game	Date	Opponent	Score	High points	High rebounds	High assists	Location Attendance	Record
11	March 8	Magnolia	L 95–110	Shawn Glover (22)	Ato Ular (10)	JVee Casio (10)	Ynares Center	1–10

== Transactions ==
=== Free agency ===
==== Signings ====
Player	Date signed	Contract amount	Contract length	Former team
Yousef Taha	May 23, 2022	Not disclosed	1 year	Re-signed
Rey Publico	May 23, 2022	Not disclosed	1 year	Alaska Aces
Jollo Go	July 21, 2022	Not disclosed	1 year	Marinerong Pilipino Skippers (PBA D-League)
Trevis Jackson	September 20, 2022	Not disclosed	Not disclosed	Rain or Shine Elasto Painters
Baser Amer	December 29, 2022	Not disclosed	1 year	Re-signed

=== Trades ===
==== Pre-season ====
May
May 21, 2022	To Blackwater Yousef Taha	To Converge Kurt Lojera

==== Mid-season ====
September
September 19, 2022	To Blackwater Gab Banal; Troy Rosario	To NLEX Brandon Ganuelas-Rosser; 2022 NorthPort second-round pick (from Blackwater); 2025 Blackwater second-round pick	To TNT Calvin Oftana; Raul Soyud

==== Commissioner's Cup ====
January
January 3, 2023	To Blackwater Michael DiGregorio; Tyrus Hill; RK Ilagan	To Converge Barkley Eboña; 2022 TNT first-round pick

=== Recruited imports ===
Tournament	Name	Debuted	Last game	Record
Commissioner's Cup	Cameron Krutwig	September 21, 2022 (vs. Bay Area)	November 25, 2022 (vs. Rain or Shine)	3–9
Governors' Cup	Shawn Glover	January 25, 2023 (vs. NLEX)	March 8, 2023 (vs. Magnolia)	1–7
Governors' Cup	Troy Williams	February 9, 2023 (vs. Terrafirma)	February 15, 2023 (vs. TNT)	0–3

== Awards ==
Recipient	Honors	Date awarded
Ato Ular	2022–23 PBA All-Rookie Team	November 19, 2023
