= 2022–23 San Miguel Beermen season =

- Head coach: Leo Austria (Philippine and Commissioner's Cup); Jorge Gallent (Governor's Cup)
- Owners: San Miguel Brewery, Inc. (a San Miguel Corporation subsidiary)

Philippine Cup results
- Record: 9–2 (81.8%)
- Place: 1st
- Playoff finish: Champions (Defeated TNT, 4–3)

Commissioner's Cup results
- Record: 7–5 (58.3%)
- Place: 5th
- Playoff finish: Semifinalist (lost to Bay Area, 1–3)

Governors' Cup results
- Record: 9–2 (81.8%)
- Place: 2nd
- Playoff finish: Semifinalist (lost to Barangay Ginebra, 0–3)

San Miguel Beermen seasons

The 2022–23 San Miguel Beermen season was the 47th season of the franchise in the Philippine Basketball Association (PBA).

== Key dates ==
- May 15: The PBA season 47 draft was held at the Robinsons Place Manila in Manila.

== Draft picks ==
Round	Pick	Player	Position	Place of birth	College
3	33	Jerwyn Guinto	F	Australia	Lyceum
4	41	Lyndon Colina	G	Philippines	USPF
5	49	John Gonzaga	G	Philippines	San Sebastian
6	52	CJ Cadua	G	USA	EAC

== Roster ==
2022–23 San Miguel Beermen roster
Players
Coaches

Pos.	#	POB	Name	Height	Weight	DOB (YYYY–MM–DD)	From
G	0	(United States)	Simon Enciso	5 ft 11 in (1.80 m)	185 lb (84 kg)	1991–02–12	Notre Dame de Namur
F	2	(Philippines)	Michael Cañete	6 ft 4 in (1.93 m)		1993–08–14	Arellano
G	5	(Philippines)	Allyn Bulanadi	6 ft 0 in (1.83 m)		1997–04–28	San Sebastian
G	6	(United States)	Chris Ross (C)	6 ft 1 in (1.85 m)	180 lb (82 kg)	1985–03–09	Marshall
G	7	(Philippines)	Terrence Romeo	5 ft 11 in (1.80 m)	178 lb (81 kg)	1992–03–16	Far Eastern
G/F	11	(United States)	Robbie Herndon	6 ft 3 in (1.91 m)	180 lb (82 kg)	1993–07–16	San Francisco
G/F	13	(United States)	Marcio Lassiter	6 ft 2 in (1.88 m)	185 lb (84 kg)	1987–05–16	Cal State Fullerton
C	15	(Philippines)	June Mar Fajardo	6 ft 10 in (2.08 m)	268 lb (122 kg)	1989–11–17	Cebu
F/C	33	(United States)	Moala Tautuaa	6 ft 8 in (2.03 m)	245 lb (111 kg)	1989–04–30	Chadron State
G	39	(Philippines)	Jericho Cruz	6 ft 1 in (1.85 m)	190 lb (86 kg)	1990–10–11	Adamson
F/C	55	(Philippines)	Jeepy Faundo	6 ft 6 in (1.98 m)		1995–09–21	UST
G/F	77	(Hong Kong)	CJ Perez	6 ft 2 in (1.88 m)	185 lb (84 kg)	1993–11–17	Lyceum
F	87	(Philippines)	Vic Manuel	6 ft 4 in (1.93 m)	201 lb (91 kg)	1987–06–18	PSBA
F	91	(Philippines)	Rodney Brondial	6 ft 5 in (1.96 m)	210 lb (95 kg)	1990–11–20	Adamson

Head coach

- (Philippines) Jorge Gallent

Assistant coach(es)

- (Philippines) Peter Martin (1st assistant)
- (Philippines) Ato Agustin
- (Philippines) Dayong Mendoza
- (Philippines) Biboy Ravanes
- (Philippines) Boyzie Zamar
- (Philippines) Leo Austria (consultant)

Team manager

- (Philippines) Gee Abanilla
- (Philippines) Daniel Henares (assistant)

Legend

- (C) Team captain
- (CI) Commissioner's Cup Import
- (GI) Governors' Cup Import
- (EI) EASL Import
- (DP) Unsigned draft pick
- (FA) Free agent
- (IN) Inactive
- (S) Suspended
- (R) Rookie
- Injured

Roster

== Philippine Cup ==
=== Eliminations ===
==== Standings ====
Pos	Team	W	L	PCT	GB	Qualification
1	San Miguel Beermen	9	2	.818	—	Twice-to-beat in the quarterfinals
2	TNT Tropang Giga	8	3	.727 (Note: Head-to-head quotient:TNT 1.12, Magnolia 0.99, Barangay Ginebra 0.90)	1	Twice-to-beat in the quarterfinals
3	Magnolia Chicken Timplados Hotshots	8	3	.727	1	Best-of-three quarterfinals
4	Barangay Ginebra San Miguel	8	3	.727	1	Best-of-three quarterfinals
5	Meralco Bolts	7	4	.636	2	Best-of-three quarterfinals
6	NLEX Road Warriors	6	5	.545	3	Best-of-three quarterfinals
7	Converge FiberXers	5	6	.455 (Note: Head-to-head record: Converge 1–0 Blackwater)	4	Twice-to-win in the quarterfinals
8	Blackwater Bossing	5	6	.455	4	Twice-to-win in the quarterfinals
9	Rain or Shine Elasto Painters	4	7	.364	5	
10	NorthPort Batang Pier	3	8	.273 (Note: Head-to-head record: NorthPort 1–0 Phoenix)	6	
11	Phoenix Super LPG Fuel Masters	3	8	.273	6	
12	Terrafirma Dyip	0	11	.000	9	

Source: PBA.ph
Rules for classification: 1) winning percentage; 2) if two teams are tied, head-to-head record; if three or more teams are tied, head-to-head goal average (quotient); if tied for 8th, one-game playoff; 3) overall quotient; 4) coin toss

==== Game log ====
2022 PBA Philippine Cup game log
Total: 9–2
June: 5–1

Game	Date	Opponent	Score	High points	High rebounds	High assists	Location Attendance	Record
1	June 8	Phoenix Super LPG	W 108–100	Fajardo, Manuel (24)	June Mar Fajardo (15)	Chris Ross (12)	Smart Araneta Coliseum	1–0
2	June 10	NLEX	W 100–92	CJ Perez (19)	June Mar Fajardo (14)	CJ Perez (5)	Ynares Center	2–0
3	June 17	Magnolia	W 87–81	Moala Tautuaa (19)	CJ Perez (12)	Jericho Cruz (7)	Ynares Center	3–0
4	June 24	Barangay Ginebra	L 72–75	Simon Enciso (18)	June Mar Fajardo (17)	Cruz, Lassiter, Tautuaa (3)	SM Mall of Asia Arena	3–1
5	June 26	Converge	W 111–92	Jericho Cruz (22)	June Mar Fajardo (16)	CJ Perez (12)	Ynares Center	4–1
6	June 29	Rain or Shine	W 99–93	CJ Perez (21)	June Mar Fajardo (16)	June Mar Fajardo (7)	Smart Araneta Coliseum	5–1

July: 4–1

Game	Date	Opponent	Score	High points	High rebounds	High assists	Location Attendance	Record
7	July 2	NorthPort	W 122–106	Fajardo, Herndon (21)	Brondial, Fajardo, Perez (9)	CJ Perez (12)	Smart Araneta Coliseum	6–1
8	July 7	TNT	W 115–99	Cruz, Fajardo (30)	Rodney Brondial (18)	CJ Perez (10)	Smart Araneta Coliseum	7–1
9	July 10	Blackwater	W 110–107 (OT)	Cruz, Fajardo (25)	June Mar Fajardo (18)	CJ Perez (5)	Smart Araneta Coliseum; 10,308	8–1
10	July 14	Terrafirma	W 109–108 (OT)	June Mar Fajardo (26)	June Mar Fajardo (10)	June Mar Fajardo (9)	Smart Araneta Coliseum	9–1
11	July 17	Meralco	L 86–89	June Mar Fajardo (21)	June Mar Fajardo (12)	CJ Perez (6)	Smart Araneta Coliseum	9–2

=== Playoffs ===
==== Bracket ====
Quarterfinals
(#1 twice-to-beat)
1	San Miguel	123
8	Blackwater	93
(Best-of-3)
4	Barangay Ginebra	1
5	Meralco	2
(#2 twice-to-beat)
2	TNT	116
7	Converge	95
(Best-of-3)
3	Magnolia	2
6	NLEX	1

Semifinals (Best-of-7)
1	San Miguel	4
5	Meralco	3
2	TNT	4
3	Magnolia	2

Finals (Best-of-7)
1	San Miguel	4
2	TNT	3

==== Game log ====
2022 PBA Philippine Cup playoffs game log
Total: 9–6
Quarterfinals: 1–0

Game	Date	Opponent	Score	High points	High rebounds	High assists	Location Attendance	Series
1	July 27	Blackwater	W 123–93	Lassiter, Perez (18)	Rodney Brondial (15)	Chris Ross (12)	Smart Araneta Coliseum	1–0

Semifinals: 4–3

Game	Date	Opponent	Score	High points	High rebounds	High assists	Location Attendance	Series
1	August 3	Meralco	W 121–97	CJ Perez (25)	Rodney Brondial (11)	Cruz, Fajardo (5)	Smart Araneta Coliseum	1–0
2	August 5	Meralco	L 88–99	June Mar Fajardo (22)	June Mar Fajardo (17)	Jericho Cruz (5)	Smart Araneta Coliseum	1–1
3	August 7	Meralco	W 96–91	CJ Perez (26)	June Mar Fajardo (16)	Ross, Tautuaa (5)	Smart Araneta Coliseum	2–1
4	August 10	Meralco	L 97–111	CJ Perez (24)	June Mar Fajardo (13)	Cruz, Perez (4)	Smart Araneta Coliseum	2–2
5	August 12	Meralco	W 89–78	CJ Perez (25)	June Mar Fajardo (15)	CJ Perez (5)	Smart Araneta Coliseum	3–2
6	August 14	Meralco	L 92–96	June Mar Fajardo (23)	June Mar Fajardo (13)	Cruz, Tautuaa (3)	Smart Araneta Coliseum; 9,439	3–3
7	August 17	Meralco	W 100–89	June Mar Fajardo (29)	June Mar Fajardo (14)	CJ Perez (9)	Smart Araneta Coliseum	4–3

Finals: 4–3

Game	Date	Opponent	Score	High points	High rebounds	High assists	Location Attendance	Series
1	August 21	TNT	L 84–86	June Mar Fajardo (24)	June Mar Fajardo (16)	Simon Enciso (4)	Smart Araneta Coliseum; 8,458	0–1
2	August 24	TNT	W 109–100	CJ Perez (23)	June Mar Fajardo (8)	Chris Ross (10)	Smart Araneta Coliseum	1–1
3	August 26	TNT	W 108–100	June Mar Fajardo (27)	June Mar Fajardo (27)	Chris Ross (5)	SM Mall of Asia Arena	2–1
4	August 28	TNT	L 87–100	June Mar Fajardo (20)	June Mar Fajardo (19)	Enciso, Perez (4)	Smart Araneta Coliseum; 10,569	2–2
5	August 31	TNT	L 93–102	June Mar Fajardo (20)	June Mar Fajardo (16)	CJ Perez (7)	Smart Araneta Coliseum	2–3
6	September 2	TNT	W 114–96	Marcio Lassiter (22)	June Mar Fajardo (12)	June Mar Fajardo (5)	Smart Araneta Coliseum	3–3
7	September 4	TNT	W 119–97	CJ Perez (25)	June Mar Fajardo (18)	CJ Perez (7)	Smart Araneta Coliseum; 15,195	4–3

== Commissioner's Cup ==
=== Eliminations ===
==== Standings ====
Pos	Team	W	L	PCT	GB	Qualification
1	Bay Area Dragons (G)	10	2	.833 (Note: Head-to-head record: Bay Area 1–0 Magnolia)	—	Twice-to-beat in the quarterfinals
2	Magnolia Chicken Timplados Hotshots	10	2	.833	—	Twice-to-beat in the quarterfinals
3	Barangay Ginebra San Miguel	9	3	.750	1	Best-of-three quarterfinals
4	Converge FiberXers	8	4	.667	2	Best-of-three quarterfinals
5	San Miguel Beermen	7	5	.583	3	Best-of-three quarterfinals
6	NorthPort Batang Pier	6	6	.500 (Note: Head-to-head record: NorthPort 1–0 Phoenix)	4	Best-of-three quarterfinals
7	Phoenix Super LPG Fuel Masters	6	6	.500	4	Twice-to-win in the quarterfinals
8	Rain or Shine Elasto Painters	5	7	.417 (Note: Eighth seed playoff: Rain or Shine 110–100 NLEX)	5	Twice-to-win in the quarterfinals
9	NLEX Road Warriors	5	7	.417	5	
10	Meralco Bolts	4	8	.333 (Note: Head-to-head record: Meralco 1–0 TNT)	6	
11	TNT Tropang Giga	4	8	.333	6	
12	Blackwater Bossing	3	9	.250	7	
13	Terrafirma Dyip	1	11	.083	9	

Source: PBA.ph
Rules for classification: 1) winning percentage; 2) if two teams are tied, head-to-head record; if three or more teams are tied, head-to-head goal average (quotient); if tied for 8th, one-game playoff; 3) overall quotient; 4) coin toss
(G) Guests

==== Game log ====
2022–23 PBA Commissioner's Cup game log
Total: 7–5
October: 3–3

Game	Date	Opponent	Score	High points	High rebounds	High assists	Location Attendance	Record
1	October 5, 2022	Blackwater	L 106–109	June Mar Fajardo (23)	June Mar Fajardo (16)	Simon Enciso (7)	Smart Araneta Coliseum	0–1
2	October 9, 2022	Rain or Shine	W 113–105	Diamond Stone (42)	Diamond Stone (13)	Chris Ross (5)	PhilSports Arena	1–1
3	October 16, 2022	Bay Area	L 87–113	CJ Perez (19)	Diamond Stone (14)	CJ Perez (6)	Smart Araneta Coliseum	1–2
4	October 21, 2022	Converge	L 102–106	CJ Perez (29)	Devon Scott (15)	Devon Scott (6)	PhilSports Arena	1–3
5	October 23, 2022	NLEX	W 124–116	Devon Scott (26)	Devon Scott (10)	Devon Scott (7)	SM Mall of Asia Arena; 12,087	2–3
6	October 26, 2022	NorthPort	W 104–86	Devon Scott (25)	Devon Scott (16)	Moala Tautuaa (7)	Ynares Center	3–3

November: 3–2

Game	Date	Opponent	Score	High points	High rebounds	High assists	Location Attendance	Record
7	November 6, 2022	Barangay Ginebra	L 96–97	Devon Scott (26)	Devon Scott (21)	Perez, Tautuaa (5)	Smart Araneta Coliseum; 10,149	3–4
8	November 16, 2022	Magnolia	L 80–85	Devon Scott (19)	Devon Scott (17)	Chris Ross (7)	Smart Araneta Coliseum	3–5
9	November 19, 2022	Phoenix Super LPG	W 108–104	Simon Enciso (20)	Devon Scott (14)	Devon Scott (6)	PhilSports Arena	4–5
10	November 23, 2022	Terrafirma	W 131–103	Jericho Cruz (25)	Devon Scott (19)	Devon Scott (11)	PhilSports Arena	5–5
11	November 26, 2022	TNT	W 119–99	Devon Scott (28)	Devon Scott (14)	Simon Enciso (7)	PhilSports Arena	6–5

December: 1–0

Game	Date	Opponent	Score	High points	High rebounds	High assists	Location Attendance	Record
12	December 2, 2022	Meralco	W 113–108	Devon Scott (32)	Devon Scott (13)	Simon Enciso (7)	PhilSports Arena	7–5

=== Playoffs ===
==== Bracket ====
Quarterfinals
(#1 twice-to-beat)
1	Bay Area	126
8	Rain or Shine	96
(best-of-3)
4	Converge	0
5	San Miguel	2
(#2 twice-to-beat)
2	Magnolia	102
7	Phoenix Super LPG	95
(best-of-3)
3	Barangay Ginebra	2
6	NorthPort	0

Semifinals (Best-of-5)
1	Bay Area	3
5	San Miguel	1
2	Magnolia	1
3	Barangay Ginebra	3

Finals (Best-of-7)
1	Bay Area	3
3	Barangay Ginebra	4

==== Game log ====
2022–23 PBA Commissioner's Cup playoffs game log
Total: 3–3
Quarterfinals: 2–0

Game	Date	Opponent	Score	High points	High rebounds	High assists	Location Attendance	Series
1	December 7, 2022	Converge	W 114–96	CJ Perez (25)	June Mar Fajardo (16)	Simon Enciso (10)	PhilSports Arena	1–0
2	December 10, 2022	Converge	W 120–107	Terrence Romeo (22)	June Mar Fajardo (18)	Enciso, Fajardo (7)	PhilSports Arena	2–0

Semifinals: 1–3

Game	Date	Opponent	Score	High points	High rebounds	High assists	Location Attendance	Series
1	December 14, 2022	Bay Area	L 102–103	CJ Perez (24)	Fajardo, Scott (8)	Devon Scott (8)	PhilSports Arena	0–1
2	December 16, 2022	Bay Area	L 95–114	June Mar Fajardo (35)	June Mar Fajardo (10)	Devon Scott (6)	PhilSports Arena	0–2
3	December 18, 2022	Bay Area	W 98–96	Devon Scott (25)	June Mar Fajardo (16)	Simon Enciso (7)	PhilSports Arena	1–2
4	December 21, 2022	Bay Area	L 92–94	CJ Perez (28)	Devon Scott (19)	Devon Scott (8)	SM Mall of Asia Arena	1–3

== Governors' Cup ==
=== Eliminations ===
==== Standings ====
Pos	Team	W	L	PCT	GB	Qualification
1	TNT Tropang Giga	10	1	.909	—	Twice-to-beat in quarterfinals
2	San Miguel Beermen	9	2	.818	1	Twice-to-beat in quarterfinals
3	Barangay Ginebra San Miguel	8	3	.727	2	Twice-to-beat in quarterfinals
4	Meralco Bolts	7	4	.636 (Note: Head-to-head quotient: Meralco 1.10, Magnolia 1.07, NLEX 0.86)	3	Twice-to-beat in quarterfinals
5	Magnolia Chicken Timplados Hotshots	7	4	.636	3	Twice-to-win in quarterfinals
6	NLEX Road Warriors	7	4	.636	3	Twice-to-win in quarterfinals
7	Converge FiberXers	6	5	.545	4	Twice-to-win in quarterfinals
8	Phoenix Super LPG Fuel Masters	4	7	.364	6	Twice-to-win in quarterfinals
9	NorthPort Batang Pier	3	8	.273	7	
10	Rain or Shine Elasto Painters	2	9	.182 (Note: Head-to-head record: Rain or Shine 1–0 Terrafirma)	8	
11	Terrafirma Dyip	2	9	.182	8	
12	Blackwater Bossing	1	10	.091	9	

Source: PBA.ph
Rules for classification: 1) winning percentage; 2) if two teams are tied, head-to-head record; if three or more teams are tied, head-to-head goal average (quotient); if tied for 8th, one-game playoff; 3) overall quotient; 4) coin toss

==== Game log ====
2023 PBA Governors' Cup game log
Total: 9–2
January: 1–0

Game	Date	Opponent	Score	High points	High rebounds	High assists	Location Attendance	Record
1	January 29	Phoenix Super LPG	W 114–93	Cameron Clark (23)	June Mar Fajardo (13)	Simon Enciso (9)	Ynares Center	1–0

February: 6–2

Game	Date	Opponent	Score	High points	High rebounds	High assists	Location Attendance	Record
2	February 1	Blackwater	W 105–86	Jericho Cruz (22)	June Mar Fajardo (16)	Enciso, Ross (7)	PhilSports Arena	2–0
3	February 3	Terrafirma	W 122–102	Cameron Clark (31)	Cameron Clark (14)	Simon Enciso (8)	Ynares Center	3–0
4	February 5	Magnolia	W 100–98	Cameron Clark (19)	Clark, Fajardo (10)	Simon Enciso (9)	Smart Araneta Coliseum; 10,080	4–0
5	February 9	Meralco	W 94–86	Cameron Clark (28)	June Mar Fajardo (14)	Cameron Clark (5)	Smart Araneta Coliseum	5–0
6	February 11	Converge	L 103–107	Cameron Clark (30)	Cameron Clark (12)	Simon Enciso (9)	SM Mall of Asia Arena	5–1
7	February 15	NorthPort	W 145–132	Cameron Clark (44)	June Mar Fajardo (12)	Simon Enciso (13)	SM Mall of Asia Arena	6–1
8	February 17	Barangay Ginebra	W 102–99	Cameron Clark (35)	June Mar Fajardo (18)	Simon Enciso (8)	Smart Araneta Coliseum	7–1
9	February 19	TNT	L 103–105	Cameron Clark (30)	June Mar Fajardo (13)	Chris Ross (6)	PhilSports Arena	7–2

March : 2–0

Game	Date	Opponent	Score	High points	High rebounds	High assists	Location Attendance	Record
All-Star Break
10	March 15	NLEX	W 120–106	Cameron Clark (45)	Cameron Clark (17)	Enciso, Lassiter, Perez (4)	PhilSports Arena	8–2
11	March 17	Rain or Shine	W 129–116	Manuel, Tautuaa (23)	Perez, Tautuaa (12)	Simon Enciso (11)	PhilSports Arena	9–2

=== Playoffs ===
==== Bracket ====
Quarterfinals (Top 4 twice-to-beat)
1	TNT	132
8	Phoenix Super LPG	105
4	Meralco	113*
5	Magnolia	107
2	San Miguel	121
7	Converge	105
3	Barangay Ginebra	127
6	NLEX	93

Semifinals (Best-of-5)
1	TNT	3
4	Meralco	1
2	San Miguel	0
3	Barangay Ginebra	3

Finals (Best-of-7)
1	TNT	4
3	Barangay Ginebra	2

*Game went into overtime

==== Game log ====
2023 PBA Governors' Cup playoffs game log
Total: 1–3
Quarterfinals: 1–0

Game	Date	Opponent	Score	High points	High rebounds	High assists	Location Attendance	Series
1	March 19	Converge	W 121–105	Cameron Clark (40)	Cameron Clark (13)	Perez, Ross (5)	Smart Araneta Coliseum	1–0

Semifinals: 0–3

Game	Date	Opponent	Score	High points	High rebounds	High assists	Location Attendance	Series
1	March 24	Barangay Ginebra	L 112–121	Cameron Clark (26)	Moala Tautuaa (10)	Simon Enciso (6)	Ynares Center	0–1
2	March 26	Barangay Ginebra	L 103–121	Cameron Clark (23)	Cameron Clark (17)	Chris Ross (8)	Ynares Center	0–2
3	March 29	Barangay Ginebra	L 85–87	Cameron Clark (16)	Cameron Clark (10)	Simon Enciso (5)	Smart Araneta Coliseum	0–3

== EASL Champions Week ==
=== Group stage ===
==== Standings ====
Pos	Team	Pld	W	L	PF	PA	PD	Pts	Qualification
1	(South Korea) Anyang KGC	2	2	0	236	156	+80	4 (Note: Anyang KGC +80 PD, Ryukyu Golden Kings +33 PD.)	Final
2	(Japan) Ryukyu Golden Kings	2	2	0	179	146	+33	4	Third place game
3	(Chinese Taipei) Taipei Fubon Braves	2	0	2	147	177	−30	2	
4	(Philippines) San Miguel Beermen	2	0	2	155	238	−83	2	

Source: EASL

==== Game log ====
2 March 2023
19:30

Box score

Ryukyu Golden Kings (Japan)	96–68	(Philippines) San Miguel Beermen
Scoring by quarter: 24–17, 25–11, 21–20, 26–20
Pts: Cooley, Imamura 20; Rebs: Cooley, Durham 16; Asts: Durham 7		Pts: Clark 25; Rebs: Tautuaa 10; Asts: Enciso 6

Nikkan Arena Tochigi, Utsunomiya

4 March 2023
16:00

Box score

Anyang KGC (South Korea)	142–87	(Philippines) San Miguel Beermen
Scoring by quarter: 40–20, 29–16, 40–29, 33–22
Pts: Spellman 53; Rebs: Monroe 17; Asts: Monroe 14		Pts: Clark 35; Rebs: Clark 10; Asts: Perez 5

Okinawa Arena, Okinawa City

== Transactions ==
=== Free agency ===
==== Signings ====
Player	Date signed	Contract amount	Contract length	Former team
Michael Cañete	May 31, 2022	Not disclosed	1 year	Meralco Bolts
Jeepy Faundo	May 31, 2022	Not disclosed	1 year	NorthPort Batang Pier

=== Trades ===
==== Philippine Cup ====
June
June 6, 2022	To San Miguel Robbie Herndon	To Converge 2023 San Miguel second-round pick 2024 San Miguel second-round pick

==== Mid-season ====
September
September 20, 2022	To San Miguel 2024 NorthPort second-round pick 2025 NorthPort second-round pick	To Barangay Ginebra Von Pessumal	To NorthPort Jeff Chan; Kent Salado

==== Commissioner's Cup ====
January
January 5, 2023	To San Miguel Allyn Bulanadi	To NorthPort Paul Zamar; 2025 San Miguel second-round pick

=== Recruited imports ===
Tournament	Name	Debuted	Last game	Record
Commissioner's Cup	Diamond Stone	October 5, 2022 (vs. Blackwater)	October 16, 2022 (vs. Bay Area)	1–2
Commissioner's Cup	Devon Scott	October 21, 2022 (vs. Converge)	December 21, 2022 (vs. Bay Area)	9–6
Governors' Cup	Cameron Clark	January 29, 2023 (vs. Phoenix)	March 29, 2023 (vs. Barangay Ginebra)	10–5

== Awards ==
Recipient	Award	Date awarded
June Mar Fajardo	2022 PBA Philippine Cup Best Player of the Conference	August 28, 2022
June Mar Fajardo	2022 PBA Philippine Cup Finals Most Valuable Player	September 4, 2022
Honors
June Mar Fajardo	2022–23 PBA Most Valuable Player	November 5, 2023
June Mar Fajardo	2022–23 PBA All-Defensive Team	November 5, 2023
June Mar Fajardo	2022–23 PBA Mythical First Team	November 5, 2023
CJ Perez	2022–23 PBA Mythical First Team	November 5, 2023
CJ Perez	2022–23 Scoring Champion	November 19, 2023
Jericho Cruz	2022–23 PBA Mr. Quality Minutes	November 19, 2023
