= 2022–23 Barangay Ginebra San Miguel season =

- Head coach: Tim Cone
- General manager: Alfrancis Chua
- Owners: Ginebra San Miguel, Inc. (a San Miguel Corporation subsidiary)

Philippine Cup results
- Record: 8–3 (72.7%)
- Place: 4th
- Playoff finish: Quarterfinalist (lost to Meralco, 1–2)

Commissioner's Cup results
- Record: 9–3 (75%)
- Place: 3rd
- Playoff finish: Champions (Defeated Bay Area, 4–3)

Governors' Cup results
- Record: 8–3 (72.7%)
- Place: 3rd
- Playoff finish: Runner-up (lost to TNT, 2–4)

Barangay Ginebra San Miguel seasons

The 2022–23 Barangay Ginebra San Miguel season was the 43rd season of the franchise in the Philippine Basketball Association (PBA).

== Key dates ==
- May 15: The PBA season 47 draft was held at the Robinsons Place Manila in Manila.
- January 12: Long-time import Justin Brownlee became a naturalized Filipino citizen.
- March 1: Team captain LA Tenorio's consecutive games played of 744 games ended due to a groin injury.
- March 21: LA Tenorio announced that he was diagnosed with stage 3 colon cancer.

== Draft picks ==
Round	Pick	Player	Position	Place of birth	College
1	8	Javi Gómez de Liaño	F	Philippines	UP Diliman
2	20	Jayson David	G/F	Philippines	Lyceum
3	32	Rence Alcoriza	G	Philippines	Arellano

== Roster ==
2022–23 Barangay Ginebra San Miguel roster
Players
Coaches

Pos.	#	POB	Name	Height	Weight	DOB (YYYY–MM–DD)	From
G/F	0	(United States)	Jeremiah Gray (R)	6 ft 5 in (1.96 m)	205 lb (93 kg)	1996–08–16	Dominican (CA)
F	2	(United States)	Jared Dillinger	6 ft 4 in (1.93 m)	220 lb (100 kg)	1984–01–06	Hawaiʻi
F	3	(United States)	Jamie Malonzo	6 ft 6 in (1.98 m)	210 lb (95 kg)	1996–07–31	De La Salle
G	5	(Philippines)	LA Tenorio (C)	5 ft 9 in (1.75 m)	151 lb (68 kg)	1984–07–09	Ateneo
G	9	(Philippines)	Scottie Thompson	6 ft 1 in (1.85 m)	180 lb (82 kg)	1993–07–12	UPHSD
G	11	(United States)	Stanley Pringle	6 ft 1 in (1.85 m)	190 lb (86 kg)	1987–03–05	Penn State
G	17	(Philippines)	John Pinto	5 ft 11 in (1.80 m)	170 lb (77 kg)	1990–10–15	Arellano
G/F	19	(Philippines)	Von Pessumal	6 ft 2 in (1.88 m)	185 lb (84 kg)	1993–02–12	Ateneo
F/C	23	(Philippines)	Raymond Aguilar	6 ft 4 in (1.93 m)	200 lb (91 kg)	1985–07–27	National-U
G/F	24	(Philippines)	Jayson David (R)	6 ft 3 in (1.91 m)	191 lb (87 kg)	1996–11–08	Lyceum
C	25	(Philippines)	Japeth Aguilar	6 ft 9 in (2.06 m)	235 lb (107 kg)	1987–01–25	Western Kentucky
F	27	(Philippines)	Sidney Onwubere	6 ft 4 in (1.93 m)		1993–08–01	Emilio Aguinaldo
F	31	(Philippines)	Aljon Mariano	6 ft 3 in (1.91 m)	175 lb (79 kg)	1992–08–03	UST
F/C	34	(Germany)	Christian Standhardinger	6 ft 8 in (2.03 m)	220 lb (100 kg)	1989–07–04	Hawaiʻi
F	32	(United States)	Justin Brownlee (CI / GI)	6 ft 6 in (1.98 m)	220 lb (100 kg)	1988–04–23	St. John's

Head coach

- (United States) Tim Cone

Assistant coach(es)

- (Philippines) Richard del Rosario (1st assistant)
- (Philippines) Freddie Abuda
- (United States) Kirk Collier
- (Philippines) Patrick Partosa
- (Philippines) Olsen Racela
- (Philippines) LA Tenorio

Team manager

- (Philippines) Alfrancis Chua^{[a]}
- (Philippines) Raymond Rodriguez (assistant)

Legend

- (C) Team captain
- (CI) Commissioner's Cup Import
- (GI) Governors' Cup Import
- (EI) EASL Import
- (DP) Unsigned draft pick
- (FA) Free agent
- (IN) Inactive
- (S) Suspended
- (R) Rookie
- Injured

Roster

- ^{a} Also serves as Barangay Ginebra's board governor.

== Philippine Cup ==
=== Eliminations ===
==== Standings ====
Pos	Team	W	L	PCT	GB	Qualification
1	San Miguel Beermen	9	2	.818	—	Twice-to-beat in the quarterfinals
2	TNT Tropang Giga	8	3	.727 (Note: Head-to-head quotient:TNT 1.12, Magnolia 0.99, Barangay Ginebra 0.90)	1	Twice-to-beat in the quarterfinals
3	Magnolia Chicken Timplados Hotshots	8	3	.727	1	Best-of-three quarterfinals
4	Barangay Ginebra San Miguel	8	3	.727	1	Best-of-three quarterfinals
5	Meralco Bolts	7	4	.636	2	Best-of-three quarterfinals
6	NLEX Road Warriors	6	5	.545	3	Best-of-three quarterfinals
7	Converge FiberXers	5	6	.455 (Note: Head-to-head record: Converge 1–0 Blackwater)	4	Twice-to-win in the quarterfinals
8	Blackwater Bossing	5	6	.455	4	Twice-to-win in the quarterfinals
9	Rain or Shine Elasto Painters	4	7	.364	5	
10	NorthPort Batang Pier	3	8	.273 (Note: Head-to-head record: NorthPort 1–0 Phoenix)	6	
11	Phoenix Super LPG Fuel Masters	3	8	.273	6	
12	Terrafirma Dyip	0	11	.000	9	

Source: PBA.ph
Rules for classification: 1) winning percentage; 2) if two teams are tied, head-to-head record; if three or more teams are tied, head-to-head goal average (quotient); if tied for 8th, one-game playoff; 3) overall quotient; 4) coin toss

==== Game log ====
2022 PBA Philippine Cup game log
Total: 8–3
June: 4–1

Game	Date	Opponent	Score	High points	High rebounds	High assists	Location Attendance	Record
1	June 12	Blackwater	W 85–82	Christian Standhardinger (21)	Scottie Thompson (16)	Scottie Thompson (9)	Ynares Center	1–0
2	June 15	Rain or Shine	W 90–85	Japeth Aguilar (23)	Christian Standhardinger (14)	Scottie Thompson (8)	SM Mall of Asia Arena	2–0
3	June 19	Magnolia	L 84–89	LA Tenorio (15)	Aguilar, Standhardinger (10)	Scottie Thompson (5)	SM Mall of Asia Arena	2–1
4	June 22	NLEX	W 83–75	Japeth Aguilar (20)	Pinto, Standhardinger (9)	LA Tenorio (8)	SM Mall of Asia Arena	3–1
5	June 24	San Miguel	W 75–72	Christian Standhardinger (20)	Japeth Aguilar (14)	Scottie Thompson (7)	SM Mall of Asia Arena	4–1

July: 4–2

Game	Date	Opponent	Score	High points	High rebounds	High assists	Location Attendance	Record
6	July 1	Converge	W 105–89	Scottie Thompson (24)	Christian Standhardinger (13)	LA Tenorio (10)	Smart Araneta Coliseum	5–1
7	July 6	Terrafirma	W 106–82	Japeth Aguilar (22)	Scottie Thompson (12)	Christian Standhardinger (7)	Smart Araneta Coliseum	6–1
8	July 10	TNT	L 92–106	Japeth Aguilar (18)	Christian Standhardinger (12)	Tenorio, Thompson (7)	Smart Araneta Coliseum; 10,308	6–2
9	July 13	Meralco	L 73–90	Scottie Thompson (14)	Japeth Aguilar (13)	LA Tenorio (5)	Smart Araneta Coliseum	6–3
10	July 17	NorthPort	W 100–93	Scottie Thompson (23)	Scottie Thompson (15)	Scottie Thompson (8)	Smart Araneta Coliseum	7–3
11	July 21	Phoenix Super LPG	W 100–93	Japeth Aguilar (17)	Scottie Thompson (14)	Pinto, Pringle (6)	Smart Araneta Coliseum	8–3

=== Playoffs ===
==== Bracket ====
Quarterfinals
(#1 twice-to-beat)
1	San Miguel	123
8	Blackwater	93
(Best-of-3)
4	Barangay Ginebra	1
5	Meralco	2
(#2 twice-to-beat)
2	TNT	116
7	Converge	95
(Best-of-3)
3	Magnolia	2
6	NLEX	1

Semifinals (Best-of-7)
1	San Miguel	4
5	Meralco	3
2	TNT	4
3	Magnolia	2

Finals (Best-of-7)
1	San Miguel	4
2	TNT	3

==== Game log ====
2022 PBA Philippine Cup playoffs game log
Total: 1–2
Quarterfinals: 1–2

Game	Date	Opponent	Score	High points	High rebounds	High assists	Location Attendance	Series
1	July 24	Meralco	L 82–93	Scottie Thompson (29)	Scottie Thompson (10)	LA Tenorio (4)	Smart Araneta Coliseum	0–1
2	July 29	Meralco	W 94–87	Japeth Aguilar (25)	Christian Standhardinger (12)	Scottie Thompson (9)	Filoil EcoOil Centre	1–1
3	July 31	Meralco	L 104–106	Scottie Thompson (26)	Christian Standhardinger (10)	Pringle, Tenorio (6)	SM Mall of Asia Arena	1–2

== Commissioner's Cup ==
=== Eliminations ===
==== Standings ====
Pos	Team	W	L	PCT	GB	Qualification
1	Bay Area Dragons (G)	10	2	.833 (Note: Head-to-head record: Bay Area 1–0 Magnolia)	—	Twice-to-beat in the quarterfinals
2	Magnolia Chicken Timplados Hotshots	10	2	.833	—	Twice-to-beat in the quarterfinals
3	Barangay Ginebra San Miguel	9	3	.750	1	Best-of-three quarterfinals
4	Converge FiberXers	8	4	.667	2	Best-of-three quarterfinals
5	San Miguel Beermen	7	5	.583	3	Best-of-three quarterfinals
6	NorthPort Batang Pier	6	6	.500 (Note: Head-to-head record: NorthPort 1–0 Phoenix)	4	Best-of-three quarterfinals
7	Phoenix Super LPG Fuel Masters	6	6	.500	4	Twice-to-win in the quarterfinals
8	Rain or Shine Elasto Painters	5	7	.417 (Note: Eighth seed playoff: Rain or Shine 110–100 NLEX)	5	Twice-to-win in the quarterfinals
9	NLEX Road Warriors	5	7	.417	5	
10	Meralco Bolts	4	8	.333 (Note: Head-to-head record: Meralco 1–0 TNT)	6	
11	TNT Tropang Giga	4	8	.333	6	
12	Blackwater Bossing	3	9	.250	7	
13	Terrafirma Dyip	1	11	.083	9	

Source: PBA.ph
Rules for classification: 1) winning percentage; 2) if two teams are tied, head-to-head record; if three or more teams are tied, head-to-head goal average (quotient); if tied for 8th, one-game playoff; 3) overall quotient; 4) coin toss
(G) Guests

==== Game log ====
2022–23 PBA Commissioner's Cup game log
Total: 9–3
September: 0–1

Game	Date	Opponent	Score	High points	High rebounds	High assists	Location Attendance	Record
1	September 28, 2022	Rain or Shine	L 71–93	Justin Brownlee (20)	Justin Brownlee (16)	Justin Brownlee (5)	SM Mall of Asia Arena	0–1

October: 4–1

Game	Date	Opponent	Score	High points	High rebounds	High assists	Location Attendance	Record
2	October 2, 2022	Meralco	W 99–91	Justin Brownlee (34)	Scottie Thompson (9)	Scottie Thompson (9)	Smart Araneta Coliseum	1–1
3	October 9, 2022	Bay Area	W 111–93	Justin Brownlee (46)	Justin Brownlee (12)	Scottie Thompson (5)	PhilSports Arena	2–1
4	October 14, 2022	Phoenix Super LPG	L 93–101	Stanley Pringle (25)	Justin Brownlee (11)	Justin Brownlee (8)	Smart Araneta Coliseum	2–2
5	October 23, 2022	Magnolia	W 103–97	Justin Brownlee (26)	Jamie Malonzo (14)	Justin Brownlee (12)	SM Mall of Asia Arena; 12,087	3–2
6	October 28, 2022	Terrafirma	W 111–90	Justin Brownlee (23)	Justin Brownlee (11)	Justin Brownlee (11)	Smart Araneta Coliseum	4–2

November: 5–1

Game	Date	Opponent	Score	High points	High rebounds	High assists	Location Attendance	Record
7	November 6, 2022	San Miguel	W 97–96	Justin Brownlee (33)	Aguilar, Brownlee (11)	Justin Brownlee (9)	Smart Araneta Coliseum; 10,149	5–2
8	November 18, 2022	Blackwater	W 98–84	Justin Brownlee (17)	Christian Standhardinger (9)	Scottie Thompson (6)	Smart Araneta Coliseum	6–2
9	November 20, 2022	TNT	W 89–85	Justin Brownlee (21)	Japeth Aguilar (12)	Justin Brownlee (8)	Smart Araneta Coliseum	7–2
10	November 25, 2022	NLEX	L 117–120 (OT)	Justin Brownlee (39)	Scottie Thompson (12)	LA Tenorio (8)	PhilSports Arena	7–3
11	November 27, 2022	NorthPort	W 122–105	Justin Brownlee (31)	Brownlee, Standhardinger (13)	Brownlee, Thompson (9)	PhilSports Arena	8–3
12	November 30, 2022	Converge	W 115–96	Justin Brownlee (25)	Justin Brownlee (12)	Justin Brownlee (9)	PhilSports Arena	9–3

=== Playoffs ===
==== Bracket ====
Quarterfinals
(#1 twice-to-beat)
1	Bay Area	126
8	Rain or Shine	96
(best-of-3)
4	Converge	0
5	San Miguel	2
(#2 twice-to-beat)
2	Magnolia	102
7	Phoenix Super LPG	95
(best-of-3)
3	Barangay Ginebra	2
6	NorthPort	0

Semifinals (Best-of-5)
1	Bay Area	3
5	San Miguel	1
2	Magnolia	1
3	Barangay Ginebra	3

Finals (Best-of-7)
1	Bay Area	3
3	Barangay Ginebra	4

==== Game log ====
2022–23 PBA Commissioner's Cup playoffs game log
Total: 9–4
Quarterfinals: 2–0

Game	Date	Opponent	Score	High points	High rebounds	High assists	Location Attendance	Series
1	December 7, 2022	NorthPort	W 118–102	Justin Brownlee (39)	Jamie Malonzo (9)	Justin Brownlee (7)	PhilSports Arena	1–0
2	December 10, 2022	NorthPort	W 99–93	Justin Brownlee (20)	Brownlee, Thompson (9)	Scottie Thompson (9)	PhilSports Arena	2–0

Semifinals: 3–1

Game	Date	Opponent	Score	High points	High rebounds	High assists	Location Attendance	Series
1	December 14, 2022	Magnolia	W 87–84	Jamie Malonzo (21)	Justin Brownlee (13)	Brownlee, Tenorio, Thompson (6)	PhilSports Arena	1–0
2	December 16, 2022	Magnolia	L 95–96	Justin Brownlee (34)	Scottie Thompson (9)	LA Tenorio (7)	PhilSports Arena	1–1
3	December 18, 2022	Magnolia	W 103–80	Justin Brownlee (38)	Justin Brownlee (9)	Justin Brownlee (7)	PhilSports Arena	2–1
4	December 21, 2022	Magnolia	W 99–84	Justin Brownlee (24)	Justin Brownlee (14)	Brownlee, Malonzo (6)	SM Mall of Asia Arena	3–1

Finals: 4–3

Game	Date	Opponent	Score	High points	High rebounds	High assists	Location Attendance	Series
1	December 25, 2022	Bay Area	W 96–81	Justin Brownlee (28)	Justin Brownlee (13)	Brownlee, Thompson (6)	SM Mall of Asia Arena; 18,252	1–0
2	December 28, 2022	Bay Area	L 82–99	Justin Brownlee (32)	Justin Brownlee (11)	Pinto, Tenorio (4)	Smart Araneta Coliseum; 16,044	1–1
3	January 4, 2023	Bay Area	W 89–82	Justin Brownlee (34)	Justin Brownlee (17)	Brownlee, Thompson (4)	SM Mall of Asia Arena; 15,004	2–1
4	January 6, 2023	Bay Area	L 86–94	Justin Brownlee (23)	Justin Brownlee (13)	Justin Brownlee (11)	SM Mall of Asia Arena; 17,236	2–2
5	January 8, 2023	Bay Area	W 101–91	Justin Brownlee (37)	Brownlee, Malonzo (8)	Scottie Thompson (8)	SM Mall of Asia Arena; 21,823	3–2
6	January 11, 2023	Bay Area	L 84–87	Justin Brownlee (37)	Justin Brownlee (10)	Justin Brownlee (11)	Smart Araneta Coliseum; 22,361	3–3
7	January 15, 2023	Bay Area	W 114–99	Justin Brownlee (34)	Jamie Malonzo (17)	Justin Brownlee (12)	Philippine Arena; 54,589	4–3

== Governors' Cup ==
=== Eliminations ===
==== Standings ====
Pos	Team	W	L	PCT	GB	Qualification
1	TNT Tropang Giga	10	1	.909	—	Twice-to-beat in quarterfinals
2	San Miguel Beermen	9	2	.818	1	Twice-to-beat in quarterfinals
3	Barangay Ginebra San Miguel	8	3	.727	2	Twice-to-beat in quarterfinals
4	Meralco Bolts	7	4	.636 (Note: Head-to-head quotient: Meralco 1.10, Magnolia 1.07, NLEX 0.86)	3	Twice-to-beat in quarterfinals
5	Magnolia Chicken Timplados Hotshots	7	4	.636	3	Twice-to-win in quarterfinals
6	NLEX Road Warriors	7	4	.636	3	Twice-to-win in quarterfinals
7	Converge FiberXers	6	5	.545	4	Twice-to-win in quarterfinals
8	Phoenix Super LPG Fuel Masters	4	7	.364	6	Twice-to-win in quarterfinals
9	NorthPort Batang Pier	3	8	.273	7	
10	Rain or Shine Elasto Painters	2	9	.182 (Note: Head-to-head record: Rain or Shine 1–0 Terrafirma)	8	
11	Terrafirma Dyip	2	9	.182	8	
12	Blackwater Bossing	1	10	.091	9	

Source: PBA.ph
Rules for classification: 1) winning percentage; 2) if two teams are tied, head-to-head record; if three or more teams are tied, head-to-head goal average (quotient); if tied for 8th, one-game playoff; 3) overall quotient; 4) coin toss

==== Game log ====
2023 PBA Governors' Cup game log
Total: 8–3
February: 4–2

Game	Date	Opponent	Score	High points	High rebounds	High assists	Location Attendance	Record
1	February 5	Rain or Shine	W 116–108	Justin Brownlee (29)	Justin Brownlee (10)	Justin Brownlee (11)	Smart Araneta Coliseum; 10,080	1–0
2	February 8	NLEX	W 114–111	Justin Brownlee (44)	Justin Brownlee (16)	Scottie Thompson (10)	Smart Araneta Coliseum	2–0
3	February 10	NorthPort	W 115–100	Jamie Malonzo (28)	Justin Brownlee (15)	Justin Brownlee (12)	SM Mall of Asia Arena	3–0
4	February 12	Magnolia	L 88–118	Justin Brownlee (22)	Christian Standhardinger (11)	Justin Brownlee (9)	SM Mall of Asia Arena; 11,212	3–1
5	February 17	San Miguel	L 99–102	Christian Standhardinger (29)	Scottie Thompson (11)	Justin Brownlee (9)	Smart Araneta Coliseum	3–2
6	February 19	Blackwater	W 115–93	Christian Standhardinger (27)	Justin Brownlee (10)	Scottie Thompson (7)	PhilSports Arena	4–2

March: 4–1

Game	Date	Opponent	Score	High points	High rebounds	High assists	Location Attendance	Record
7	March 1	Meralco	W 112–107	Christian Standhardinger (31)	Christian Standhardinger (10)	Scottie Thompson (10)	Smart Araneta Coliseum	5–2
8	March 3	Phoenix Super LPG	W 109–89	Christian Standhardinger (28)	Christian Standhardinger (12)	Christian Standhardinger (8)	Smart Araneta Coliseum	6–2
9	March 5	Converge	W 120–101	Jamie Malonzo (29)	Christian Standhardinger (12)	John Pinto (8)	PhilSports Arena	7–2
10	March 8	Terrafirma	W 109–104	Justin Brownlee (38)	Jamie Malonzo (13)	Brownlee, Pinto, Standhardinger (6)	Ynares Center	8–2
All-Star Break
11	March 17	TNT	L 105–114	Justin Brownlee (27)	Christian Standhardinger (13)	Scottie Thompson (10)	PhilSports Arena	8–3

=== Playoffs ===
==== Bracket ====
Quarterfinals (Top 4 twice-to-beat)
1	TNT	132
8	Phoenix Super LPG	105
4	Meralco	113*
5	Magnolia	107
2	San Miguel	121
7	Converge	105
3	Barangay Ginebra	127
6	NLEX	93

Semifinals (Best-of-5)
1	TNT	3
4	Meralco	1
2	San Miguel	0
3	Barangay Ginebra	3

Finals (Best-of-7)
1	TNT	4
3	Barangay Ginebra	2

*Game went into overtime

==== Game log ====
2023 PBA Governors' Cup playoffs game log
Total: 6–4
Quarterfinals: 1–0

Game	Date	Opponent	Score	High points	High rebounds	High assists	Location Attendance	Series
1	March 19	NLEX	W 127–93	Justin Brownlee (31)	Justin Brownlee (13)	Pinto, Thompson (7)	Smart Araneta Coliseum	1–0

Semifinals: 3–0

Game	Date	Opponent	Score	High points	High rebounds	High assists	Location Attendance	Series
1	March 24	San Miguel	W 121–112	Christian Standhardinger (33)	Justin Brownlee (12)	Scottie Thompson (7)	Ynares Center	1–0
2	March 26	San Miguel	W 121–103	Brownlee, Standhardinger (32)	Scottie Thompson (11)	Scottie Thompson (11)	Ynares Center	2–0
3	March 29	San Miguel	W 87–85	Justin Brownlee (22)	Christian Standhardinger (17)	Christian Standhardinger (7)	Smart Araneta Coliseum	3–0

Finals: 2–4

Game	Date	Opponent	Score	High points	High rebounds	High assists	Location Attendance	Series
1	April 9	TNT	W 102–90	Justin Brownlee (31)	Scottie Thompson (13)	Scottie Thompson (11)	Smart Araneta Coliseum; 11,580	1–0
2	April 12	TNT	L 82–95	Christian Standhardinger (29)	Christian Standhardinger (11)	Justin Brownlee (8)	Smart Araneta Coliseum	1–1
3	April 14	TNT	W 117–103	Justin Brownlee (29)	Malonzo, Standhardinger (10)	Scottie Thompson (10)	Smart Araneta Coliseum	2–1
4	April 16	TNT	L 104–116	Justin Brownlee (28)	Scottie Thompson (9)	Christian Standhardinger (9)	Smart Araneta Coliseum; 16,203	2–2
5	April 19	TNT	L 95–104	Christian Standhardinger (29)	Christian Standhardinger (13)	Scottie Thompson (6)	Smart Araneta Coliseum; 10,070	2–3
6	April 21	TNT	L 93–97	Justin Brownlee (29)	Justin Brownlee (12)	Scottie Thompson (9)	Smart Araneta Coliseum; 13,588	2–4

== Transactions ==
=== Free agency ===
==== Signings ====
Player	Date signed	Contract amount	Contract length	Former team
Jeff Chan	May 27, 2022	Not disclosed	1 year	Re-signed
Jared Dillinger	February 24, 2023	Not disclosed	Not disclosed	Re-signed

=== Trades ===
==== Pre-season ====
May
May 17, 2022	To Barangay Ginebra Jeremiah Gray	To Terrafirma Brian Enriquez; Javi Gómez de Liaño
June
June 3, 2022	To Barangay Ginebra 2023 NorthPort second-round pick	To NorthPort MJ Ayaay

==== Mid-season ====
September
September 20, 2022	To Barangay Ginebra Jamie Malonzo	To NorthPort Prince Caperal; Arvin Tolentino; 2022 Barangay Ginebra first-round pick
September 20, 2022	To Barangay Ginebra Von Pessumal	To NorthPort Jeff Chan; Kent Salado	To San Miguel 2024 NorthPort second-round pick 2025 NorthPort second-round pick

=== Recruited imports ===
Tournament	Name	Debuted	Last game	Record
Commissioner's Cup	Justin Brownlee	September 28, 2022 (vs. Rain or Shine)	January 15, 2023 (vs. Bay Area)	18–7
Governors' Cup	Justin Brownlee	February 5, 2023 (vs. Rain or Shine)	April 21, 2023 (vs. TNT)	14–7

== Awards ==
Recipient	Award	Date awarded
Justin Brownlee	2022–23 PBA Commissioner's Cup Best Import of the Conference	January 6, 2023
Scottie Thompson	2022–23 PBA Commissioner's Cup Best Player of the Conference	January 6, 2023
Christian Standhardinger	2022–23 PBA Commissioner's Cup Finals Most Valuable Player	January 15, 2023
Christian Standhardinger	2023 PBA Governors' Cup Best Player of the Conference	April 16, 2023
Honors
Christian Standhardinger	2022–23 PBA All-Defensive Team	November 5, 2023
Christian Standhardinger	2022–23 PBA Mythical First Team	November 5, 2023
Scottie Thompson	2022–23 PBA Mythical First Team	November 5, 2023
Jamie Malonzo	2022–23 PBA Mythical First Team	November 5, 2023
Tim Cone	2022–23 PBA Coach of the Year	November 19, 2023
