= 2022–23 TNT Tropang Giga season =

- Head coach: Chot Reyes (Philippine and Commissioner's Cup); Jojo Lastimosa (Governors' Cup)
- Consultant: Chot Reyes (Governors' Cup; senior consultant); Slavoljub Gorunovic (Governors' Cup; active consultant)
- General manager: Jojo Lastimosa; Miguel Fernandez (assistant)
- Owners: Smart Communications (an MVP Group subsidiary)

Philippine Cup results
- Record: 8–3 (72.7%)
- Place: 2nd
- Playoff finish: Runner-up (lost to San Miguel, 3–4)

Commissioner's Cup results
- Record: 4–8 (33.3%)
- Place: 11th
- Playoff finish: Did not qualify

Governors' Cup results
- Record: 10–1 (90.9%)
- Place: 1st
- Playoff finish: Champions (def. Barangay Ginebra, 4–2)

TNT Tropang Giga seasons

The 2022–23 TNT Tropang Giga season was the 32nd season of the franchise in the Philippine Basketball Association (PBA).

== Key dates ==
- May 15: The PBA season 47 draft was held at the Robinsons Place Manila in Manila.

== Draft picks ==
Round	Pick	Player	Position	Place of birth	College
3	35	Roberto Bartolo	C	Philippines	Benilde
4	43	John Villanueva	G	Philippines	Perpetual

== Roster ==
2022–23 TNT Tropang Giga roster
Players
Coaches

Pos.	#	POB	Name	Height	Weight	DOB (YYYY–MM–DD)	From
C	1	(Philippines)	Justin Chua	6 ft 6 in (1.98 m)	232 lb (105 kg)	1989–07–13	Ateneo
F	2	(Philippines)	Carl Bryan Cruz	6 ft 4 in (1.93 m)	200 lb (91 kg)	1991–08–21	Far Eastern
G	5	(United States)	Mikey Williams	6 ft 2 in (1.88 m)	190 lb (86 kg)	1991–10–27	Cal State Fullerton
C	6	(Philippines)	Rey Mark Acuno	6 ft 7 in (2.01 m)	226 lb (103 kg)	1994–08–29	UE
C	7	(Philippines)	Poy Erram	6 ft 8 in (2.03 m)	227 lb (103 kg)	1989–07–07	Ateneo
F	8	(Philippines)	Calvin Oftana	6 ft 5 in (1.96 m)	196 lb (89 kg)	1996–01–03	San Beda
F	9	(United States)	Paul Varilla	6 ft 3 in (1.91 m)		1993–08–10	UE
G	10	(Philippines)	Ryan Reyes	6 ft 2 in (1.88 m)	190 lb (86 kg)	1983–08–10	Cal State Fullerton
G/F	11	(Philippines)	Jaydee Tungcab (R)	6 ft 3 in (1.91 m)	196 lb (89 kg)	1997–05–05	Philippines
F	12	(Philippines)	Glenn Khobuntin	6 ft 4 in (1.93 m)	195 lb (88 kg)	1991–09–07	National-U
G	13	(Philippines)	Brian Heruela	5 ft 10 in (1.78 m)	195 lb (88 kg)	1989–04–13	Cebu
G	15	(Philippines)	Kib Montalbo	6 ft 0 in (1.83 m)	155 lb (70 kg)	1996–04–02	De La Salle
G/F	16	(Philippines)	Roger Pogoy	6 ft 2 in (1.88 m)	180 lb (82 kg)	1992–06–16	Far Eastern
G	17	(Philippines)	Jayson Castro	5 ft 10 in (1.78 m)	185 lb (84 kg)	1986–06–30	Philippine Christian
F/C	21	(United States)	Kelly Williams (C)	6 ft 6 in (1.98 m)	215 lb (98 kg)	1982–02–07	Oakland
F/C	22	(Philippines)	Dave Marcelo	6 ft 5 in (1.96 m)	223 lb (101 kg)	1989–02–22	San Beda
F	24	(Philippines)	Matt Ganuelas-Rosser	6 ft 4 in (1.93 m)	186 lb (84 kg)	1990–06–13	Cal Poly Pomona

Head coach

- (Philippines) Jojo Lastimosa

Assistant coach(es)

- (Philippines) Josh Reyes (1st assistant)
- (Philippines) Sandy Arespacochaga
- (Philippines) Mau Belen
- (Philippines) Ranidel de Ocampo
- (Philippines) Yuri Escueta
- (Philippines) Bong Ravena
- (Serbia) Slavoljub Gorunovic (active consultant)
- (Philippines) Chot Reyes (senior consultant)

Team manager

- (Philippines) Jojo Lastimosa
- (Philippines) Miguel Fernandez (assistant)

Legend

- (C) Team captain
- (CI) Commissioner's Cup Import
- (GI) Governors' Cup Import
- (EI) EASL Import
- (DP) Unsigned draft pick
- (FA) Free agent
- (IN) Inactive
- (S) Suspended
- (R) Rookie
- Injured

Roster

== Philippine Cup ==
=== Eliminations ===
==== Standings ====
Pos	Team	W	L	PCT	GB	Qualification
1	San Miguel Beermen	9	2	.818	—	Twice-to-beat in the quarterfinals
2	TNT Tropang Giga	8	3	.727 (Note: Head-to-head quotient:TNT 1.12, Magnolia 0.99, Barangay Ginebra 0.90)	1	Twice-to-beat in the quarterfinals
3	Magnolia Chicken Timplados Hotshots	8	3	.727	1	Best-of-three quarterfinals
4	Barangay Ginebra San Miguel	8	3	.727	1	Best-of-three quarterfinals
5	Meralco Bolts	7	4	.636	2	Best-of-three quarterfinals
6	NLEX Road Warriors	6	5	.545	3	Best-of-three quarterfinals
7	Converge FiberXers	5	6	.455 (Note: Head-to-head record: Converge 1–0 Blackwater)	4	Twice-to-win in the quarterfinals
8	Blackwater Bossing	5	6	.455	4	Twice-to-win in the quarterfinals
9	Rain or Shine Elasto Painters	4	7	.364	5	
10	NorthPort Batang Pier	3	8	.273 (Note: Head-to-head record: NorthPort 1–0 Phoenix)	6	
11	Phoenix Super LPG Fuel Masters	3	8	.273	6	
12	Terrafirma Dyip	0	11	.000	9	

Source: PBA.ph
Rules for classification: 1) winning percentage; 2) if two teams are tied, head-to-head record; if three or more teams are tied, head-to-head goal average (quotient); if tied for 8th, one-game playoff; 3) overall quotient; 4) coin toss

==== Game log ====
2022 PBA Philippine Cup game log
Total: 8–3
June: 6–2

Game	Date	Opponent	Score	High points	High rebounds	High assists	Location Attendance	Record
1	June 5	Magnolia	W 78–72	Troy Rosario (22)	Poy Erram (14)	Jayson Castro (6)	Smart Araneta Coliseum; 8,241	1–0
2	June 9	Blackwater	L 78–85	Roger Pogoy (32)	Poy Erram (10)	Kib Montalbo (4)	Ynares Center	1–1
3	June 12	Converge	W 86–83	Jayson Castro (17)	Troy Rosario (13)	Castro, Pogoy (3)	Ynares Center	2–1
4	June 16	NLEX	L 89–90	Roger Pogoy (28)	Glenn Khobuntin (8)	Jayson Castro (7)	Ynares Center	2–2
5	June 18	Meralco	W 78–71	Roger Pogoy (19)	Kelly Williams (9)	Alejandro, Castro, Heruela (4)	Ynares Center	3–2
6	June 23	Rain or Shine	W 89–85 (OT)	Troy Rosario (19)	Kelly Williams (13)	Mikey Williams (6)	Ynares Center	4–2
7	June 26	Phoenix Super LPG	W 87–72	Mikey Williams (27)	Poy Erram (12)	Mikey Williams (7)	Ynares Center	5–2
8	June 29	NorthPort	W 117–112	Mikey Williams (27)	Poy Erram (14)	Jayson Castro (8)	Smart Araneta Coliseum	6–2

July: 2–1

Game	Date	Opponent	Score	High points	High rebounds	High assists	Location Attendance	Record
9	July 1	Terrafirma	W 114–86	Mikey Williams (31)	Poy Erram (9)	Jayson Castro (7)	Smart Araneta Coliseum	7–2
10	July 7	San Miguel	L 99–115	Kelly Williams (20)	Kelly Williams (10)	Matt Ganuelas-Rosser (4)	Smart Araneta Coliseum	7–3
11	July 10	Barangay Ginebra	W 106–92	Roger Pogoy (30)	Kelly Williams (9)	Jayson Castro (8)	Smart Araneta Coliseum; 10,308	8–3

=== Playoffs ===
==== Bracket ====
Quarterfinals
(#1 twice-to-beat)
1	San Miguel	123
8	Blackwater	93
(Best-of-3)
4	Barangay Ginebra	1
5	Meralco	2
(#2 twice-to-beat)
2	TNT	116
7	Converge	95
(Best-of-3)
3	Magnolia	2
6	NLEX	1

Semifinals (Best-of-7)
1	San Miguel	4
5	Meralco	3
2	TNT	4
3	Magnolia	2

Finals (Best-of-7)
1	San Miguel	4
2	TNT	3

==== Game log ====
2022 PBA Philippine Cup playoffs game log
Total: 8–6
Quarterfinals: 1–0

Game	Date	Opponent	Score	High points	High rebounds	High assists	Location Attendance	Series
1	July 27	Converge	W 116–95	Mikey Williams (26)	Troy Rosario (7)	Mikey Williams (4)	Smart Araneta Coliseum	1–0

Semifinals: 4–2

Game	Date	Opponent	Score	High points	High rebounds	High assists	Location Attendance	Series
1	August 3	Magnolia	W 108–96	Mikey Williams (26)	Poy Erram (8)	Castro, Pogoy (5)	Smart Araneta Coliseum	1–0
2	August 5	Magnolia	L 88–92	Mikey Williams (28)	Jayson Castro (8)	Matt Ganuelas-Rosser (7)	Smart Araneta Coliseum	1–1
3	August 7	Magnolia	W 93–92	Poy Erram (22)	Glenn Khobuntin (9)	Mikey Williams (10)	Smart Araneta Coliseum	2–1
4	August 10	Magnolia	W 102–84	Poy Erram (19)	Poy Erram (13)	Mikey Williams (7)	Smart Araneta Coliseum	3–1
5	August 12	Magnolia	L 97–105	Jayson Castro (18)	Kelly Williams (10)	Mikey Williams (6)	Smart Araneta Coliseum	3–2
6	August 14	Magnolia	W 87–74	Jayson Castro (26)	Kelly Williams (13)	Mikey Williams (5)	Smart Araneta Coliseum; 9,439	4–2

Finals: 3–4

Game	Date	Opponent	Score	High points	High rebounds	High assists	Location Attendance	Series
1	August 21	San Miguel	W 86–84	Roger Pogoy (26)	Kelly Williams (9)	Rosario, K. Williams (3)	Smart Araneta Coliseum; 8,458	1–0
2	August 24	San Miguel	L 100–109	Roger Pogoy (28)	Kelly Williams (9)	Poy Erram (5)	Smart Araneta Coliseum	1–1
3	August 26	San Miguel	L 100–108	Roger Pogoy (25)	Poy Erram (15)	Mikey Williams (5)	SM Mall of Asia Arena	1–2
4	August 28	San Miguel	W 100–87	Jayson Castro (26)	Poy Erram (8)	Mikey Williams (6)	Smart Araneta Coliseum; 10,569	2–2
5	August 31	San Miguel	W 102–93	Mikey Williams (23)	Kelly Williams (9)	Mikey Williams (5)	Smart Araneta Coliseum	3–2
6	September 2	San Miguel	L 96–114	Roger Pogoy (31)	Poy Erram (8)	Kib Montalbo (5)	Smart Araneta Coliseum	3–3
7	September 4	San Miguel	L 97–119	Jayson Castro (32)	Jayson Castro (10)	Jayson Castro (8)	Smart Araneta Coliseum; 15,195	3–4

== Commissioner's Cup ==
=== Eliminations ===
==== Standings ====
Pos	Team	W	L	PCT	GB	Qualification
1	Bay Area Dragons (G)	10	2	.833 (Note: Head-to-head record: Bay Area 1–0 Magnolia)	—	Twice-to-beat in the quarterfinals
2	Magnolia Chicken Timplados Hotshots	10	2	.833	—	Twice-to-beat in the quarterfinals
3	Barangay Ginebra San Miguel	9	3	.750	1	Best-of-three quarterfinals
4	Converge FiberXers	8	4	.667	2	Best-of-three quarterfinals
5	San Miguel Beermen	7	5	.583	3	Best-of-three quarterfinals
6	NorthPort Batang Pier	6	6	.500 (Note: Head-to-head record: NorthPort 1–0 Phoenix)	4	Best-of-three quarterfinals
7	Phoenix Super LPG Fuel Masters	6	6	.500	4	Twice-to-win in the quarterfinals
8	Rain or Shine Elasto Painters	5	7	.417 (Note: Eighth seed playoff: Rain or Shine 110–100 NLEX)	5	Twice-to-win in the quarterfinals
9	NLEX Road Warriors	5	7	.417	5	
10	Meralco Bolts	4	8	.333 (Note: Head-to-head record: Meralco 1–0 TNT)	6	
11	TNT Tropang Giga	4	8	.333	6	
12	Blackwater Bossing	3	9	.250	7	
13	Terrafirma Dyip	1	11	.083	9	

Source: PBA.ph
Rules for classification: 1) winning percentage; 2) if two teams are tied, head-to-head record; if three or more teams are tied, head-to-head goal average (quotient); if tied for 8th, one-game playoff; 3) overall quotient; 4) coin toss
(G) Guests

==== Game log ====
2022–23 PBA Commissioner's Cup game log
Total: 4–8
October: 3–4

Game	Date	Opponent	Score	High points	High rebounds	High assists	Location Attendance	Record
1	October 5, 2022	Magnolia	L 92–94	Cameron Oliver (43)	Cameron Oliver (17)	Cameron Oliver (5)	Smart Araneta Coliseum	0–1
2	October 8, 2022	NorthPort	W 117–93	Roger Pogoy (32)	Cameron Oliver (10)	Mikey Williams (6)	PhilSports Arena	1–1
3	October 15, 2022	Rain or Shine	W 110–91	Cameron Oliver (21)	Poy Erram (9)	Jayson Castro (6)	Smart Araneta Coliseum	2–1
4	October 19, 2022	NLEX	L 101–110	Cameron Oliver (26)	Cameron Oliver (22)	Oliver, M. Williams (5)	PhilSports Arena	2–2
5	October 22, 2022	Blackwater	W 108–98	Cameron Oliver (38)	Cameron Oliver (10)	Jayson Castro (7)	PhilSports Arena	3–2
6	October 28, 2022	Converge	L 117–130	Cameron Oliver (41)	Cameron Oliver (11)	Mikey Williams (6)	Smart Araneta Coliseum	3–3
7	October 30, 2022	Phoenix Super LPG	L 88–91	Calvin Oftana (27)	Cameron Oliver (10)	Jayson Castro (6)	Ynares Center	3–4

November: 1–4

Game	Date	Opponent	Score	High points	High rebounds	High assists	Location Attendance	Record
8	November 5, 2022	Terrafirma	W 121–90	Cameron Oliver (26)	Cameron Oliver (15)	Jayson Castro (6)	Ynares Center	4–4
9	November 16, 2022	Meralco	L 91–97	Cameron Oliver (25)	Cameron Oliver (20)	Jayson Castro (7)	Smart Araneta Coliseum	4–5
10	November 20, 2022	Barangay Ginebra	L 85–89	Mikey Williams (20)	Calvin Oftana (10)	Mikey Williams (5)	Smart Araneta Coliseum	4–6
11	November 23, 2022	Bay Area	L 108–140	Matt Mobley (38)	Poy Erram (12)	Kelly Williams (3)	PhilSports Arena	4–7
12	November 26, 2022	San Miguel	L 99–119	Roger Pogoy (23)	Matt Mobley (7)	Matt Mobley (7)	PhilSports Arena	4–8

== Governors' Cup ==
=== Eliminations ===
==== Standings ====
Pos	Team	W	L	PCT	GB	Qualification
1	TNT Tropang Giga	10	1	.909	—	Twice-to-beat in quarterfinals
2	San Miguel Beermen	9	2	.818	1	Twice-to-beat in quarterfinals
3	Barangay Ginebra San Miguel	8	3	.727	2	Twice-to-beat in quarterfinals
4	Meralco Bolts	7	4	.636 (Note: Head-to-head quotient: Meralco 1.099, Magnolia 1.0741, NLEX 0.86)	3	Twice-to-beat in quarterfinals
5	Magnolia Chicken Timplados Hotshots	7	4	.636	3	Twice-to-win in quarterfinals
6	NLEX Road Warriors	7	4	.636	3	Twice-to-win in quarterfinals
7	Converge FiberXers	6	5	.545	4	Twice-to-win in quarterfinals
8	Phoenix Super LPG Fuel Masters	4	7	.364	6	Twice-to-win in quarterfinals
9	NorthPort Batang Pier	3	8	.273	7	
10	Rain or Shine Elasto Painters	2	9	.182	8	
11	Terrafirma Dyip	2	9	.182	8	
12	Blackwater Bossing	1	10	.091	9	

Source: PBA.ph
Rules for classification: 1) winning percentage; 2) if two teams are tied, head-to-head record; if three or more teams are tied, head-to-head goal average (quotient); if tied for 8th, one-game playoff; 3) overall quotient; 4) coin toss

==== Game log ====
2023 PBA Governors' Cup game log
Total: 10–1
January: 2–0

Game	Date	Opponent	Score	High points	High rebounds	High assists	Location Attendance	Record
1	January 25	Phoenix Super LPG	W 123–119	Jalen Hudson (34)	Jalen Hudson (10)	Jalen Hudson (7)	Smart Araneta Coliseum	1–0
2	January 27	Rain or Shine	W 105–100	Hudson, M. Williams (24)	Jalen Hudson (14)	Mikey Williams (7)	Ynares Center	2–0

February: 6–1

Game	Date	Opponent	Score	High points	High rebounds	High assists	Location Attendance	Record
3	February 1	NLEX	L 108–110	Jalen Hudson (39)	Kelly Williams (13)	Jalen Hudson (5)	PhilSports Arena	2–1
4	February 3	Magnolia	W 93–85	Roger Pogoy (20)	Calvin Oftana (10)	Jalen Hudson (5)	Ynares Center	3–1
5	February 8	Converge	W 128–122	Jalen Hudson (56)	Jalen Hudson (12)	Jalen Hudson (4)	Smart Araneta Coliseum	4–1
6	February 11	Terrafirma	W 131–109	Jalen Hudson (36)	Calvin Oftana (10)	Mikey Williams (6)	SM Mall of Asia Arena	5–1
7	February 15	Blackwater	W 138–116	Roger Pogoy (40)	Rondae Hollis-Jefferson (13)	Rondae Hollis-Jefferson (7)	SM Mall of Asia Arena	6–1
8	February 17	Meralco	W 111–104	Rondae Hollis-Jefferson (34)	Rondae Hollis-Jefferson (11)	Rondae Hollis-Jefferson (8)	Smart Araneta Coliseum	7–1
9	February 19	San Miguel	W 105–103	Jayson Castro (21)	Rondae Hollis-Jefferson (14)	Jayson Castro (8)	PhilSports Arena	8–1

March: 2–0

Game	Date	Opponent	Score	High points	High rebounds	High assists	Location Attendance	Record
All-Star Break
10	March 15	NorthPort	W 134–110	Rondae Hollis-Jefferson (31)	Rondae Hollis-Jefferson (11)	Mikey Williams (8)	PhilSports Arena	9–1
11	March 17	Barangay Ginebra	W 114–105	Rondae Hollis-Jefferson (34)	Rondae Hollis-Jefferson (11)	Mikey Williams (6)	PhilSports Arena	10–1

=== Playoffs ===
==== Bracket ====
Quarterfinals (Top 4 twice-to-beat)
1	TNT	132
8	Phoenix Super LPG	105
4	Meralco	113*
5	Magnolia	107
2	San Miguel	121
7	Converge	105
3	Barangay Ginebra	127
6	NLEX	93

Semifinals (Best-of-5)
1	TNT	3
4	Meralco	1
2	San Miguel	0
3	Barangay Ginebra	3

Finals (Best-of-7)
1	TNT	4
3	Barangay Ginebra	2

*Game went into overtime

==== Game log ====
2023 PBA Governors' Cup playoffs game log
Total: 8–3
Quarterfinals: 1–0

Game	Date	Opponent	Score	High points	High rebounds	High assists	Location Attendance	Series
1	March 22	Phoenix Super LPG	W 121–105	Roger Pogoy (25)	Rondae Hollis-Jefferson (12)	Rondae Hollis-Jefferson (10)	Smart Araneta Coliseum	1–0

Semifinals: 3–1

Game	Date	Opponent	Score	High points	High rebounds	High assists	Location Attendance	Series
1	March 24	Meralco	W 110–80	Rondae Hollis-Jefferson (22)	Rondae Hollis-Jefferson (13)	Rondae Hollis-Jefferson (12)	Ynares Center	1–0
2	March 26	Meralco	L 117–124 (OT)	Mikey Williams (29)	Rondae Hollis-Jefferson (15)	Rondae Hollis-Jefferson (9)	Ynares Center	1–1
3	March 29	Meralco	W 99–80	Rondae Hollis-Jefferson (40)	Rondae Hollis-Jefferson (13)	Castro, Chua, M. Williams (3)	Smart Araneta Coliseum	2–1
4	March 31	Meralco	W 107–92	Rondae Hollis-Jefferson (42)	Rondae Hollis-Jefferson (11)	Roger Pogoy (4)	Smart Araneta Coliseum	3–1

Finals: 4–2

Game	Date	Opponent	Score	High points	High rebounds	High assists	Location Attendance	Series
1	April 9	Barangay Ginebra	L 90–102	Rondae Hollis-Jefferson (30)	Rondae Hollis-Jefferson (20)	Rondae Hollis-Jefferson (5)	Smart Araneta Coliseum; 11,580	0–1
2	April 12	Barangay Ginebra	W 95–82	Rondae Hollis-Jefferson (23)	Rondae Hollis-Jefferson (19)	Rondae Hollis-Jefferson (9)	Smart Araneta Coliseum	1–1
3	April 14	Barangay Ginebra	L 103–117	Rondae Hollis-Jefferson (32)	Rondae Hollis-Jefferson (10)	Rondae Hollis-Jefferson (6)	Smart Araneta Coliseum	1–2
4	April 16	Barangay Ginebra	W 116–104	Rondae Hollis-Jefferson (36)	Rondae Hollis-Jefferson (10)	Rondae Hollis-Jefferson (5)	Smart Araneta Coliseum; 16,203	2–2
5	April 19	Barangay Ginebra	W 104–95	Rondae Hollis-Jefferson (32)	Rondae Hollis-Jefferson (16)	Rondae Hollis-Jefferson (10)	Smart Araneta Coliseum; 10,070	3–2
6	April 21	Barangay Ginebra	W 97–93	Mikey Williams (38)	Rondae Hollis-Jefferson (14)	Rondae Hollis-Jefferson (6)	Smart Araneta Coliseum; 13,588	4–2

== EASL Champions Week ==
=== Group stage ===
==== Standings ====
Pos	Team	Pld	W	L	PF	PA	PD	Pts	Qualification
1	(South Korea) Seoul SK Knights	2	2	0	172	153	+19	4	Final
2	(Hong Kong) Bay Area Dragons	2	1	1	180	182	−2	3 (Note: Bay Area Dragons 1–0 Utsunomiya Brex)	Third place game
3	(Japan) Utsunomiya Brex	2	1	1	189	162	+27	3	
4	(Philippines) TNT Tropang Giga	2	0	2	135	179	−44	2	

Source: EASL

==== Game log ====
1 March 2023
19:30

Box score

Utsunomiya Brex (Japan)	99–66	(Philippines) TNT Tropang Giga
Scoring by quarter: 25–26, 32–8, 22–21, 20–11
Pts: Scott 24; Rebs: Scott 14; Asts: Hiejima 6		Pts: Hudson 28; Rebs: Ochefu 9 Asts: Oftana 3

Nikkan Arena Tochigi, Utsunomiya

3 March 2023
17:00

Box score

TNT Tropang Giga (Philippines)	69–80	(South Korea) Seoul SK Knights
Scoring by quarter: 28–25, 14–16, 13–16, 14–23
Pts: Oftana 16; Rebs: Ochefu 12; Asts: M. Williams 4		Pts: Kim, Warney 21; Rebs: Williams 21; Asts: Warney 11

Nikkan Arena Tochigi, Utsunomiya

== Transactions ==
=== Free agency ===
==== Signings ====
Player	Date signed	Contract amount	Contract length	Former team
Mikey Williams	July 26, 2022	Not disclosed	3 years	Re-signed
Calvin Oftana	October 4, 2022	Not disclosed	3 years	Re-signed
Jayson Castro	October 13, 2022	₱420,000 per month (max. contract)	3 years	Re-signed
Paul Varilla	March 15, 2023	Not disclosed	2 years	Re-signed

=== Trades ===
==== Mid-season ====
September
September 19, 2022	To TNT Calvin Oftana; Raul Soyud	To Blackwater Gab Banal; Troy Rosario	To NLEX Brandon Ganuelas-Rosser; 2022 NorthPort second-round pick (from Blackwater); 2025 Blackwater second-round pick
January
January 18, 2023	To TNT Justin Chua; Paul Varilla	To NLEX Sean Anthony; Jake Pascual	To Phoenix Jjay Alejandro; Raul Soyud; 2022 NLEX second-round pick 2026 TNT second-round pick

=== Recruited imports ===
Tournament	Name	Debuted	Last game	Record
Commissioner's Cup	Cameron Oliver	October 5, 2022 (vs. Magnolia)	November 16, 2022 (vs. Meralco)	4–5
Commissioner's Cup	Matt Mobley	November 23, 2022 (vs. Bay Area)	November 26, 2022 (vs. San Miguel)	0–2
Governors' Cup	Jalen Hudson	January 25, 2023 (vs. Phoenix)	February 11, 2023 (vs. Terrafirma)	5–1
Governors' Cup	Rondae Hollis-Jefferson	February 15, 2023 (vs. Blackwater)	April 21, 2023 (vs. Barangay Ginebra)	13–3

== Awards ==
Recipient	Award	Date awarded.
Rondae Hollis-Jefferson	2023 PBA Governors' Cup Best Import of the Conference	April 16, 2023
Honors
Calvin Oftana	2022–23 PBA Mythical Second Team	November 5, 2023
Mikey Williams	2022–23 PBA Mythical Second Team	November 5, 2023
Jayson Castro	2022–23 PBA Order of Merit	November 19, 2023
Jojo Lastimosa	2022–23 PBA Executive of the Year	November 19, 2023
