= 2022–23 NLEX Road Warriors season =

- Head coach: Yeng Guiao (Philippine Cup); Frankie Lim
- Owners: Metro Pacific Investments Corporation (an MVP Group subsidiary)

Philippine Cup results
- Record: 6–5 (54.5%)
- Place: 6th
- Playoff finish: Quarterfinalist (lost to Magnolia, 1–2)

Commissioner's Cup results
- Record: 5–7 (41.7%)
- Place: 9th
- Playoff finish: Did not qualify

Governors' Cup results
- Record: 7–4 (63.6%)
- Place: 6th
- Playoff finish: Quarterfinalist (lost to Barangay Ginebra with twice-to-win disadvantage)

NLEX Road Warriors seasons

The 2022–23 NLEX Road Warriors season was the 8th season of the franchise in the Philippine Basketball Association (PBA).

== Key dates ==
- May 15: The PBA season 47 draft was held at the Robinsons Place Manila in Manila.

== Draft picks ==
Round	Pick	Player	Position	Place of birth	College
1	7	Tyrus Hill	F	USA	De La Salle
2	21	Chester Saldua	F	USA	PCU
3	31	Levi dela Cruz	G	Philippines	Arellano

== Roster ==
2022–23 NLEX Road Warriors roster
Players
Coaches

Pos.	#	POB	Name	Height	Weight	DOB (YYYY–MM–DD)	From
G	1	(Philippines)	Reden Celda	6 ft 0 in (1.83 m)	165 lb (75 kg)	1992–03–01	National-U
F/C	2	(Philippines)	Michael Miranda	6 ft 6 in (1.98 m)	210 lb (95 kg)	1990–12–12	San Sebastian
G	4	(Philippines)	Clint Doliguez	6 ft 1 in (1.85 m)	188 lb (85 kg)	1994–05–27	San Beda
G	5	(United States)	Kris Rosales	6 ft 0 in (1.83 m)	165 lb (75 kg)	1990–12–20	Hope International
G	7	(Philippines)	Kevin Alas (C)	6 ft 1 in (1.85 m)	175 lb (79 kg)	1991–11–13	Letran
F	8	(Philippines)	Don Trollano	6 ft 3 in (1.91 m)	182 lb (83 kg)	1992–01–07	Adamson
G	9	(Philippines)	Philip Paniamogan	6 ft 0 in (1.83 m)	180 lb (82 kg)	1991–05–30	José Rizal
F	10	(Canada)	Sean Anthony	6 ft 4 in (1.93 m)	200 lb (91 kg)	1986–01–26	McGill
F	11	(Philippines)	Kenneth Ighalo	6 ft 2 in (1.88 m)	175 lb (79 kg)	1989–01–11	Mapúa
G	12	(Philippines)	Matt Nieto	6 ft 1 in (1.85 m)	160 lb (73 kg)	1997–05–31	Ateneo
F	22	(Philippines)	Jake Pascual	6 ft 4 in (1.93 m)	200 lb (91 kg)	1988–11–11	San Beda
G	23	(Philippines)	Hesed Gabo (R)	5 ft 9 in (1.75 m)		1992–03–21	Mapúa
F	33	(Australia)	Anthony Semerad	6 ft 4 in (1.93 m)	220 lb (100 kg)	1991–04–25	San Beda
F/C	37	(Philippines)	J. R. Quiñahan	6 ft 6 in (1.98 m)	235 lb (107 kg)	1984–05–08	Visayas
F/C	45	(United States)	Brandon Ganuelas-Rosser (R)	6 ft 6 in (1.98 m)	220 lb (100 kg)	1994–06–29	UC Riverside
C	88	(Tonga)	Asi Taulava	6 ft 9 in (2.06 m)	245 lb (111 kg)	1973–03–02	BYU–Hawaii
F/C	–	(Philippines)	Marion Magat (3x3)	6 ft 7 in (2.01 m)	180 lb (82 kg)	1989–10–22	National-U

Head coach

- (Philippines) Frankie Lim

Assistant coach(es)

- (Philippines) Adonis Tierra (1st assistant)
- (Philippines) Borgie Hermida
- (Philippines) Melo Lim
- (Philippines) Emman Monfort
- (Philippines) Jaime Serrano
- (Philippines) JB Sison

Team manager

- (Philippines) Larry Fonacier

Legend

- (C) Team captain
- (CI) Commissioner's Cup Import
- (GI) Governors' Cup Import
- (EI) EASL Import
- (DP) Unsigned draft pick
- (FA) Free agent
- (IN) Inactive
- (S) Suspended
- (R) Rookie
- Injured

Roster

== Philippine Cup ==
=== Eliminations ===
==== Standings ====
Pos	Team	W	L	PCT	GB	Qualification
1	San Miguel Beermen	9	2	.818	—	Twice-to-beat in the quarterfinals
2	TNT Tropang Giga	8	3	.727 (Note: Head-to-head quotient:TNT 1.12, Magnolia 0.99, Barangay Ginebra 0.90)	1	Twice-to-beat in the quarterfinals
3	Magnolia Chicken Timplados Hotshots	8	3	.727	1	Best-of-three quarterfinals
4	Barangay Ginebra San Miguel	8	3	.727	1	Best-of-three quarterfinals
5	Meralco Bolts	7	4	.636	2	Best-of-three quarterfinals
6	NLEX Road Warriors	6	5	.545	3	Best-of-three quarterfinals
7	Converge FiberXers	5	6	.455 (Note: Head-to-head record: Converge 1–0 Blackwater)	4	Twice-to-win in the quarterfinals
8	Blackwater Bossing	5	6	.455	4	Twice-to-win in the quarterfinals
9	Rain or Shine Elasto Painters	4	7	.364	5	
10	NorthPort Batang Pier	3	8	.273 (Note: Head-to-head record: NorthPort 1–0 Phoenix)	6	
11	Phoenix Super LPG Fuel Masters	3	8	.273	6	
12	Terrafirma Dyip	0	11	.000	9	

Source: PBA.ph
Rules for classification: 1) winning percentage; 2) if two teams are tied, head-to-head record; if three or more teams are tied, head-to-head goal average (quotient); if tied for 8th, one-game playoff; 3) overall quotient; 4) coin toss

==== Game log ====
2022 PBA Philippine Cup game log
Total: 6–5
June: 4–2

Game	Date	Opponent	Score	High points	High rebounds	High assists	Location Attendance	Record
1	June 8	Terrafirma	W 105–102	Kevin Alas (24)	Justin Chua (10)	Alas, Quiñahan (6)	Smart Araneta Coliseum	1–0
2	June 10	San Miguel	L 92–100	Don Trollano (21)	Quiñahan, Rosales (7)	Kevin Alas (6)	Ynares Center	1–1
3	June 16	TNT	W 90–89	Calvin Oftana (20)	Kevin Alas (7)	Kevin Alas (6)	Ynares Center	2–1
4	June 22	Barangay Ginebra	L 75–83	Kevin Alas (16)	Calvin Oftana (12)	J. R. Quiñahan (6)	SM Mall of Asia Arena	2–2
5	June 25	Meralco	W 90–75	Don Trollano (19)	Calvin Oftana (13)	Kevin Alas (5)	Ynares Center	3–2
6	June 30	Phoenix Super LPG	W 114–108 (OT)	Calvin Oftana (22)	Calvin Oftana (10)	Alas, Oftana (7)	Smart Araneta Coliseum	4–2

July: 2–3

Game	Date	Opponent	Score	High points	High rebounds	High assists	Location Attendance	Record
7	July 2	Magnolia	L 73–87	J. R. Quiñahan (17)	Justin Chua (9)	Alas, Chua, Oftana, Trollano (2)	Smart Araneta Coliseum	4–3
8	July 7	Converge	L 108–112	Kris Rosales (29)	Alas, Oftana (8)	Kevin Alas (7)	Smart Araneta Coliseum	4–4
9	July 9	Rain or Shine	L 86–96	Don Trollano (20)	Don Trollano (11)	Kevin Alas (7)	Smart Araneta Coliseum	4–5
10	July 15	Blackwater	W 98–68	Don Trollano (16)	Justin Chua (9)	Kris Rosales (4)	Ynares Center	5–5
11	July 22	NorthPort	W 109–95	Raul Soyud (19)	Justin Chua (9)	Matt Nieto (8)	Smart Araneta Coliseum	6–5

=== Playoffs ===
==== Bracket ====
Quarterfinals
(#1 twice-to-beat)
1	San Miguel	123
8	Blackwater	93
(Best-of-3)
4	Barangay Ginebra	1
5	Meralco	2
(#2 twice-to-beat)
2	TNT	116
7	Converge	95
(Best-of-3)
3	Magnolia	2
6	NLEX	1

Semifinals (Best-of-7)
1	San Miguel	4
5	Meralco	3
2	TNT	4
3	Magnolia	2

Finals (Best-of-7)
1	San Miguel	4
2	TNT	3

==== Game log ====
2022 PBA Philippine Cup playoffs game log
Total: 1–2
Quarterfinals: 1–2

Game	Date	Opponent	Score	High points	High rebounds	High assists	Location Attendance	Series
1	July 24	Magnolia	L 89–98	Anthony Semerad (19)	Anthony Semerad (6)	Nieto, Oftana, Paniamogan, Trollano (4)	Smart Araneta Coliseum	0–1
2	July 29	Magnolia	W 90–77	Kevin Alas (30)	Don Trollano (12)	Alas, Trollano (4)	Filoil EcoOil Centre	1–1
3	July 31	Magnolia	L 106–112 (OT)	Calvin Oftana (32)	Kevin Alas (11)	Alas, Trollano (5)	SM Mall of Asia Arena	1–2

== Commissioner's Cup ==
=== Eliminations ===
==== Standings ====
Pos	Team	W	L	PCT	GB	Qualification
1	Bay Area Dragons (G)	10	2	.833 (Note: Head-to-head record: Bay Area 1–0 Magnolia)	—	Twice-to-beat in the quarterfinals
2	Magnolia Chicken Timplados Hotshots	10	2	.833	—	Twice-to-beat in the quarterfinals
3	Barangay Ginebra San Miguel	9	3	.750	1	Best-of-three quarterfinals
4	Converge FiberXers	8	4	.667	2	Best-of-three quarterfinals
5	San Miguel Beermen	7	5	.583	3	Best-of-three quarterfinals
6	NorthPort Batang Pier	6	6	.500 (Note: Head-to-head record: NorthPort 1–0 Phoenix)	4	Best-of-three quarterfinals
7	Phoenix Super LPG Fuel Masters	6	6	.500	4	Twice-to-win in the quarterfinals
8	Rain or Shine Elasto Painters	5	7	.417 (Note: Eighth seed playoff: Rain or Shine 110–100 NLEX)	5	Twice-to-win in the quarterfinals
9	NLEX Road Warriors	5	7	.417	5	
10	Meralco Bolts	4	8	.333 (Note: Head-to-head record: Meralco 1–0 TNT)	6	
11	TNT Tropang Giga	4	8	.333	6	
12	Blackwater Bossing	3	9	.250	7	
13	Terrafirma Dyip	1	11	.083	9	

Source: PBA.ph
Rules for classification: 1) winning percentage; 2) if two teams are tied, head-to-head record; if three or more teams are tied, head-to-head goal average (quotient); if tied for 8th, one-game playoff; 3) overall quotient; 4) coin toss
(G) Guests

==== Game log ====
2022–23 PBA Commissioner's Cup game log
Total: 5–7
September: 2–0

Game	Date	Opponent	Score	High points	High rebounds	High assists	Location Attendance	Record
1	September 23, 2022	Rain or Shine	W 96–90	Earl Clark (26)	Earl Clark (14)	Matt Nieto (5)	PhilSports Arena	1–0
2	September 30, 2022	Blackwater	W 105–102	Earl Clark (38)	Earl Clark (25)	Earl Clark (4)	Smart Araneta Coliseum	2–0

October: 1–3

Game	Date	Opponent	Score	High points	High rebounds	High assists	Location Attendance	Record
3	October 8, 2022	Phoenix Super LPG	L 97–111	Earl Clark (36)	Earl Clark (20)	Earl Clark (8)	PhilSports Arena	2–1
4	October 12, 2022	Magnolia	L 97–111	Alas, Chua (16)	Earl Clark (10)	Matt Nieto (6)	Smart Araneta Coliseum	2–2
5	October 19, 2022	TNT	W 110–101	Earl Clark (45)	Earl Clark (16)	Alas, Nieto (3)	PhilSports Arena	3–2
6	October 23, 2022	San Miguel	L 116–124	Earl Clark (40)	Earl Clark (25)	Matt Nieto (8)	SM Mall of Asia Arena; 12,087	3–3

November: 2–4

Game	Date	Opponent	Score	High points	High rebounds	High assists	Location Attendance	Record
7	November 5, 2022	Converge	L 84–108	Brandon Ganuelas-Rosser (24)	Clark, Ganuelas-Rosser (9)	Matt Nieto (7)	Ynares Center	3–4
8	November 9, 2022	NorthPort	L 94–107	Earl Clark (29)	Earl Clark (15)	Earl Clark (6)	Smart Araneta Coliseum	3–5
9	November 13, 2022	Bay Area	L 98–118	Earl Clark (17)	Earl Clark (11)	Earl Clark (5)	Smart Araneta Coliseum	3–6
10	November 18, 2022	Terrafirma	L 114–124 (OT)	Earl Clark (45)	Earl Clark (18)	Matt Nieto (9)	Smart Araneta Coliseum	3–7
11	November 25, 2022	Barangay Ginebra	W 120–117 (OT)	Earl Clark (37)	Earl Clark (17)	Kevin Alas (9)	PhilSports Arena	4–7
12	November 30, 2022	Meralco	W 92–81	Earl Clark (40)	Earl Clark (11)	Alas, Rosales, Varilla (3)	PhilSports Arena	5–7

=== Playoffs ===
==== Bracket ====
Quarterfinals
(#1 twice-to-beat)
1	Bay Area	126
8	Rain or Shine	96
(best-of-3)
4	Converge	0
5	San Miguel	2
(#2 twice-to-beat)
2	Magnolia	102
7	Phoenix Super LPG	95
(best-of-3)
3	Barangay Ginebra	2
6	NorthPort	0

Semifinals (Best-of-5)
1	Bay Area	3
5	San Miguel	1
2	Magnolia	1
3	Barangay Ginebra	3

Finals (Best-of-7)
1	Bay Area	3
3	Barangay Ginebra	4

==== Game log ====
2022–23 PBA Commissioner's Cup playoffs game log
Total: 0–1
8th seed playoff: 0–1

Game	Date	Opponent	Score	High points	High rebounds	High assists	Location Attendance	Series
1	December 4, 2022	Rain or Shine	L 100–110	Earl Clark (37)	Earl Clark (16)	Earl Clark (5)	PhilSports Arena	0–1

== Governors' Cup ==
=== Eliminations ===
==== Standings ====
Pos	Team	W	L	PCT	GB	Qualification
1	TNT Tropang Giga	10	1	.909	—	Twice-to-beat in quarterfinals
2	San Miguel Beermen	9	2	.818	1	Twice-to-beat in quarterfinals
3	Barangay Ginebra San Miguel	8	3	.727	2	Twice-to-beat in quarterfinals
4	Meralco Bolts	7	4	.636 (Note: Head-to-head quotient: Meralco 1.099, Magnolia 1.0741, NLEX 0.86)	3	Twice-to-beat in quarterfinals
5	Magnolia Chicken Timplados Hotshots	7	4	.636	3	Twice-to-win in quarterfinals
6	NLEX Road Warriors	7	4	.636	3	Twice-to-win in quarterfinals
7	Converge FiberXers	6	5	.545	4	Twice-to-win in quarterfinals
8	Phoenix Super LPG Fuel Masters	4	7	.364	6	Twice-to-win in quarterfinals
9	NorthPort Batang Pier	3	8	.273	7	
10	Rain or Shine Elasto Painters	2	9	.182	8	
11	Terrafirma Dyip	2	9	.182	8	
12	Blackwater Bossing	1	10	.091	9	

Source: PBA.ph
Rules for classification: 1) winning percentage; 2) if two teams are tied, head-to-head record; if three or more teams are tied, head-to-head goal average (quotient); if tied for 8th, one-game playoff; 3) overall quotient; 4) coin toss

==== Game log ====
2023 PBA Governors' Cup game log
Total: 7–4
January: 2–0

Game	Date	Opponent	Score	High points	High rebounds	High assists	Location Attendance	Record
1	January 25	Blackwater	W 124–102	Jonathon Simmons (32)	Jonathon Simmons (9)	Jonathon Simmons (7)	Smart Araneta Coliseum	1–0
2	January 28	NorthPort	W 121–112	Jonathon Simmons (33)	Anthony, Semerad, Simmons (8)	Kevin Alas (6)	Ynares Center	2–0

February: 4–3

Game	Date	Opponent	Score	High points	High rebounds	High assists	Location Attendance	Record
3	February 1	TNT	W 110–108	Jonathon Simmons (45)	Jonathon Simmons (12)	Jonathon Simmons (3)	PhilSports Arena	3–0
4	February 4	Phoenix Super LPG	W 98–94	Jonathon Simmons (38)	Kevin Alas (8)	Jonathon Simmons (5)	Ynares Center	4–0
5	February 8	Barangay Ginebra	L 111–114	Wayne Selden Jr. (43)	Brandon Ganuelas-Rosser (11)	Wayne Selden Jr. (7)	Smart Araneta Coliseum	4–1
6	February 16	Magnolia	L 103–119	Wayne Selden Jr. (25)	Brandon Ganuelas-Rosser (7)	Wayne Selden Jr. (9)	Smart Araneta Coliseum	4–2
7	February 18	Converge	W 116–112	Wayne Selden Jr. (35)	Ganuelas-Rosser, Selden Jr. (7)	Wayne Selden Jr. (6)	Smart Araneta Coliseum	5–2
8	February 23	Meralco	L 98–114	Wayne Selden Jr. (29)	Wayne Selden Jr. (8)	Wayne Selden Jr. (7)	PhilSports Arena	5–3
9	February 25	Rain or Shine	W 110–99	Kevin Alas (28)	Wayne Selden Jr. (10)	Matt Nieto (5)	Smart Araneta Coliseum	6–3

March: 1–1

Game	Date	Opponent	Score	High points	High rebounds	High assists	Location Attendance	Record
10	March 2	Terrafirma	W 142–125	Don Trollano (44)	Brandon Ganuelas-Rosser (12)	Nieto, Selden Jr. (8)	Smart Araneta Coliseum	7–3
All-Star Break
11	March 15	San Miguel	L 106–120	Wayne Selden Jr. (32)	Brandon Ganuelas-Rosser (15)	Kevin Alas (7)	PhilSports Arena	7–4

=== Playoffs ===
==== Bracket ====
Quarterfinals (Top 4 twice-to-beat)
1	TNT	132
8	Phoenix Super LPG	105
4	Meralco	113*
5	Magnolia	107
2	San Miguel	121
7	Converge	105
3	Barangay Ginebra	127
6	NLEX	93

Semifinals (Best-of-5)
1	TNT	3
4	Meralco	1
2	San Miguel	0
3	Barangay Ginebra	3

Finals (Best-of-7)
1	TNT	4
3	Barangay Ginebra	2

*Game went into overtime

==== Game log ====
2023 PBA Governors' Cup playoffs game log
Total: 0–1
Quarterfinals: 0–1

Game	Date	Opponent	Score	High points	High rebounds	High assists	Location Attendance	Series
1	March 19	Barangay Ginebra	L 93–127	Sean Anthony (16)	Brandon Ganuelas-Rosser (10)	Kris Rosales (6)	Smart Araneta Coliseum	0–1

== Transactions ==
=== Free agency ===
==== Signings ====
Player	Date signed	Contract amount	Contract length	Former team
Reden Celda	October 6, 2022	Not disclosed	Not disclosed	Zamboanga Family's Brand Sardines (MPBL)
Don Trollano	December 26, 2022	Not disclosed	2 years	Re-signed
Michael Miranda	December 26, 2022	Not disclosed	1 year	Re-signed
Hesed Gabo	January 16, 2023	Not disclosed	1 year	Nueva Ecija Rice Vanguards (MPBL)
Clint Doliguez	January 16, 2023	Not disclosed	Not disclosed	Pioneer ElastoSeal Katibays (PBA 3x3)
Jake Pascual	March 1, 2023	Not disclosed	2 years	Re-signed

=== Trades ===
==== Pre-season ====
May
May 17, 2022	To NLEX 2023 Converge first-round pick	To Converge David Murrell; Tyrus Hill

==== Mid-season ====
September
September 19, 2022	To NLEX Brandon Ganuelas-Rosser; 2022 NorthPort second-round pick (from Blackwater); 2025 Blackwater second-round pick	To Blackwater Gab Banal; Troy Rosario	To TNT Calvin Oftana; Raul Soyud
January
January 18, 2023	To NLEX Sean Anthony; Jake Pascual	To Phoenix Jjay Alejandro; Raul Soyud; 2022 NLEX second-round pick 2026 TNT second-round pick	To TNT Justin Chua; Paul Varilla

=== Recruited imports ===
Tournament	Name	Debuted	Last game	Record
Commissioner's Cup	Earl Clark	September 23, 2022 (vs. Rain or Shine)	December 4, 2022 (vs. Rain or Shine)	5–8
Governors' Cup	Jonathon Simmons	January 25, 2023 (vs. Blackwater)	February 2, 2023 (vs. Phoenix)	4–0
Governors' Cup	Wayne Selden Jr.	February 8, 2023 (vs. Barangay Ginebra)	March 15, 2023 (vs. San Miguel)	3–4

== Awards ==
Recipient	Honors	Date awarded
Kevin Alas	2022–23 PBA Sportsmanship Award	November 5, 2023
Brandon Ganuelas-Rosser	2022–23 PBA All-Rookie Team	November 19, 2023
