= 2022–23 Magnolia Chicken Timplados Hotshots season =

- Head coach: Chito Victolero
- Owners: San Miguel-Pure Foods Co., Inc. (a San Miguel Corporation subsidiary)

Philippine Cup results
- Record: 8–3 (72.7%)
- Place: 3rd
- Playoff finish: Semifinalist (lost to TNT, 2–4)

Commissioner's Cup results
- Record: 10–2 (83.3%)
- Place: 2nd
- Playoff finish: Semifinalist (lost to Barangay Ginebra, 1–3)

Governors' Cup results
- Record: 7–4 (63.6%)
- Place: 5th
- Playoff finish: Quarterfinalist (lost to Meralco with twice-to-win disadvantage)

Magnolia Chicken Timplados Hotshots seasons

The 2022–23 Magnolia Chicken Timplados Hotshots season was the 34th season of the franchise in the Philippine Basketball Association (PBA).

== Key dates ==
- May 15: The PBA season 47 draft was held at the Robinsons Place Manila in Manila.

== Draft picks ==
Round	Pick	Player	Position	Place of birth	College
1	12	Keith Zaldivar	C	Philippines	Adamson
2	24	Carlo de Chavez	F	USA	Bloomfield
3	36	Orlan Wamar	G	Philippines	CEU
4	44	Garciano Puerto	G	Philippines	UC

== Roster ==
2022–23 Magnolia Chicken Timplados Hotshots roster
Players
Coaches

Pos.	#	POB	Name	Height	Weight	DOB (YYYY–MM–DD)	From
G	00	(United States)	Loren Brill	5 ft 11 in (1.80 m)		1997–01–14	Old Dominion
F	1	(Philippines)	Jackson Corpuz	6 ft 4 in (1.93 m)	195 lb (88 kg)	1989–02–08	Philippine Christian
G	2	(United States)	Jerrick Ahanmisi	6 ft 1 in (1.85 m)	185 lb (84 kg)	1997–10–16	Adamson
G	3	(Philippines)	Paul Lee	6 ft 0 in (1.83 m)	200 lb (91 kg)	1989–02–14	UE
C	4	(United States)	Rafi Reavis (C)	6 ft 8 in (2.03 m)	210 lb (95 kg)	1977–07–26	Coppin State
G	6	(Philippines)	Jio Jalalon	5 ft 9 in (1.75 m)	150 lb (68 kg)	1992–08–02	Arellano
F/C	10	(Philippines)	Ian Sangalang	6 ft 7 in (2.01 m)	212 lb (96 kg)	1991–12–20	San Sebastian
F	13	(Philippines)	Calvin Abueva	6 ft 3 in (1.91 m)	209 lb (95 kg)	1988–02–04	San Sebastian
G	14	(Philippines)	Mark Barroca	5 ft 10 in (1.78 m)	170 lb (77 kg)	1986–04–25	Far Eastern
F	19	(United States)	Rome dela Rosa	6 ft 3 in (1.91 m)	185 lb (84 kg)	1990–12–11	San Beda
G/F	21	(United States)	Adrian Wong	6 ft 0 in (1.83 m)	175 lb (79 kg)	1996–02–10	Ateneo
C	25	(Philippines)	Keith Zaldivar (R)	6 ft 6 in (1.98 m)		1996–05–25	Adamson
C	42	(Australia)	James Laput	6 ft 10 in (2.08 m)	245 lb (111 kg)	1996–08–26	De La Salle
F	57	(Philippines)	Aris Dionisio	6 ft 4 in (1.93 m)		1995–07–21	St. Clare
G	65	(Philippines)	Jed Mendoza (R)	5 ft 10 in (1.78 m)	160 lb (73 kg)	1996–06–21	UE
F/C	88	(Philippines)	Russel Escoto	6 ft 6 in (1.98 m)	200 lb (91 kg)	1992–12–04	Far Eastern

Head coach

- (Philippines) Chito Victolero

Assistant coach(es)

- (Philippines) Jason Webb (1st assistant)
- (Philippines) Johnny Abarrientos
- (Philippines) Angelito Esguerra
- (Philippines) Antonio Espinosa
- (Philippines) Mon Jose
- (Philippines) Juno Sauler
- (Philippines) Paul Sorongon

Team manager

- (Philippines) Alvin Patrimonio

Legend

- (C) Team captain
- (CI) Commissioner's Cup Import
- (GI) Governors' Cup Import
- (EI) EASL Import
- (DP) Unsigned draft pick
- (FA) Free agent
- (IN) Inactive
- (S) Suspended
- (R) Rookie
- Injured

Roster

== Philippine Cup ==
=== Eliminations ===
==== Standings ====
Pos	Team	W	L	PCT	GB	Qualification
1	San Miguel Beermen	9	2	.818	—	Twice-to-beat in the quarterfinals
2	TNT Tropang Giga	8	3	.727 (Note: Head-to-head quotient:TNT 1.12, Magnolia 0.99, Barangay Ginebra 0.90)	1	Twice-to-beat in the quarterfinals
3	Magnolia Chicken Timplados Hotshots	8	3	.727	1	Best-of-three quarterfinals
4	Barangay Ginebra San Miguel	8	3	.727	1	Best-of-three quarterfinals
5	Meralco Bolts	7	4	.636	2	Best-of-three quarterfinals
6	NLEX Road Warriors	6	5	.545	3	Best-of-three quarterfinals
7	Converge FiberXers	5	6	.455 (Note: Head-to-head record: Converge 1–0 Blackwater)	4	Twice-to-win in the quarterfinals
8	Blackwater Bossing	5	6	.455	4	Twice-to-win in the quarterfinals
9	Rain or Shine Elasto Painters	4	7	.364	5	
10	NorthPort Batang Pier	3	8	.273 (Note: Head-to-head record: NorthPort 1–0 Phoenix)	6	
11	Phoenix Super LPG Fuel Masters	3	8	.273	6	
12	Terrafirma Dyip	0	11	.000	9	

Source: PBA.ph
Rules for classification: 1) winning percentage; 2) if two teams are tied, head-to-head record; if three or more teams are tied, head-to-head goal average (quotient); if tied for 8th, one-game playoff; 3) overall quotient; 4) coin toss

==== Game log ====
2022 PBA Philippine Cup game log
Total: 8–3
June: 3–3

Game	Date	Opponent	Score	High points	High rebounds	High assists	Location Attendance	Record
1	June 5	TNT	L 72–78	Ian Sangalang (18)	Calvin Abueva (12)	Jio Jalalon (3)	Smart Araneta Coliseum; 8,241	0–1
2	June 10	Converge	L 82–89 (OT)	Ian Sangalang (22)	Calvin Abueva (13)	Jio Jalalon (9)	Ynares Center	0–2
3	June 15	NorthPort	W 80–77	Calvin Abueva (23)	Calvin Abueva (12)	Jio Jalalon (6)	SM Mall of Asia Arena	1–2
4	June 17	San Miguel	L 81–87	Mark Barroca (25)	Barroca, Laput (8)	Mark Barroca (7)	Ynares Center	1–3
5	June 19	Barangay Ginebra	W 89–84	Ian Sangalang (24)	Ian Sangalang (9)	Mark Barroca (8)	SM Mall of Asia Arena	2–3
6	June 24	Phoenix Super LPG	W 95–77	Mark Barroca (21)	Ian Sangalang (10)	Jio Jalalon (8)	SM Mall of Asia Arena	3–3

July: 5–0

Game	Date	Opponent	Score	High points	High rebounds	High assists	Location Attendance	Record
7	July 2	NLEX	W 87–73	Mark Barroca (18)	Ian Sangalang (9)	Jio Jalalon (9)	Smart Araneta Coliseum	4–3
8	July 8	Terrafirma	W 104–83	Ian Sangalang (20)	Laput, Sangalang (7)	Jio Jalalon (7)	Smart Araneta Coliseum	5–3
9	July 15	Meralco	W 97–88 (OT)	Paul Lee (21)	Ian Sangalang (15)	Jio Jalalon (8)	Ynares Center	6–3
10	July 20	Rain or Shine	W 118–87	Jerrick Ahanmisi (19)	Jio Jalalon (11)	Jio Jalalon (12)	Smart Araneta Coliseum	7–3
11	July 22	Blackwater	W 75–66	Paul Lee (22)	Calvin Abueva (10)	Mark Barroca (6)	Smart Araneta Coliseum	8–3

=== Playoffs ===
==== Bracket ====
Quarterfinals
(#1 twice-to-beat)
1	San Miguel	123
8	Blackwater	93
(Best-of-3)
4	Barangay Ginebra	1
5	Meralco	2
(#2 twice-to-beat)
2	TNT	116
7	Converge	95
(Best-of-3)
3	Magnolia	2
6	NLEX	1

Semifinals (Best-of-7)
1	San Miguel	4
5	Meralco	3
2	TNT	4
3	Magnolia	2

Finals (Best-of-7)
1	San Miguel	4
2	TNT	3

==== Game log ====
2022 PBA Philippine Cup playoffs game log
Total: 4–5
Quarterfinals: 2–1

Game	Date	Opponent	Score	High points	High rebounds	High assists	Location Attendance	Series
1	July 24	NLEX	W 98–89	Mark Barroca (24)	Calvin Abueva (8)	Jalalon, Lee (5)	Smart Araneta Coliseum	1–0
2	July 29	NLEX	L 77–90	Calvin Abueva (20)	Calvin Abueva (7)	Barroca, Jalalon (5)	Filoil EcoOil Centre	1–1
3	July 31	NLEX	W 112–106 (OT)	Ian Sangalang (24)	Ian Sangalang (11)	Abueva, Jalalon (6)	SM Mall of Asia Arena	2–1

Semifinals: 2–4

Game	Date	Opponent	Score	High points	High rebounds	High assists	Location Attendance	Series
1	August 3	TNT	L 96–108	Calvin Abueva (18)	Aris Dionisio (13)	Jio Jalalon (8)	Smart Araneta Coliseum	0–1
2	August 5	TNT	W 92–88	Mark Barroca (22)	Abueva, Sangalang (8)	Calvin Abueva (5)	Smart Araneta Coliseum	1–1
3	August 7	TNT	L 92–93	Calvin Abueva (18)	Ian Sangalang (9)	Jio Jalalon (7)	Smart Araneta Coliseum	1–2
4	August 10	TNT	L 84–102	Ian Sangalang (19)	Dela Rosa, Dionisio, Jalalon (6)	Calvin Abueva (6)	Smart Araneta Coliseum	1–3
5	August 12	TNT	W 105–97	Mark Barroca (25)	Calvin Abueva (10)	Calvin Abueva (5)	Smart Araneta Coliseum	2–3
6	August 14	TNT	L 74–87	Abueva, Sangalang (16)	Ian Sangalang (12)	Mark Barroca (9)	Smart Araneta Coliseum; 9,439	2–4

== Commissioner's Cup ==
=== Eliminations ===
==== Standings ====
Pos	Team	W	L	PCT	GB	Qualification
1	Bay Area Dragons (G)	10	2	.833 (Note: Head-to-head record: Bay Area 1–0 Magnolia)	—	Twice-to-beat in the quarterfinals
2	Magnolia Chicken Timplados Hotshots	10	2	.833	—	Twice-to-beat in the quarterfinals
3	Barangay Ginebra San Miguel	9	3	.750	1	Best-of-three quarterfinals
4	Converge FiberXers	8	4	.667	2	Best-of-three quarterfinals
5	San Miguel Beermen	7	5	.583	3	Best-of-three quarterfinals
6	NorthPort Batang Pier	6	6	.500 (Note: Head-to-head record: NorthPort 1–0 Phoenix)	4	Best-of-three quarterfinals
7	Phoenix Super LPG Fuel Masters	6	6	.500	4	Twice-to-win in the quarterfinals
8	Rain or Shine Elasto Painters	5	7	.417 (Note: Eighth seed playoff: Rain or Shine 110–100 NLEX)	5	Twice-to-win in the quarterfinals
9	NLEX Road Warriors	5	7	.417	5	
10	Meralco Bolts	4	8	.333 (Note: Head-to-head record: Meralco 1–0 TNT)	6	
11	TNT Tropang Giga	4	8	.333	6	
12	Blackwater Bossing	3	9	.250	7	
13	Terrafirma Dyip	1	11	.083	9	

Source: PBA.ph
Rules for classification: 1) winning percentage; 2) if two teams are tied, head-to-head record; if three or more teams are tied, head-to-head goal average (quotient); if tied for 8th, one-game playoff; 3) overall quotient; 4) coin toss
(G) Guests

==== Game log ====
2022–23 PBA Commissioner's Cup game log
Total: 10–2
September: 1–0

Game	Date	Opponent	Score	High points	High rebounds	High assists	Location Attendance	Record
1	September 28, 2022	Terrafirma	W 100–92	Nick Rakocevic (45)	Nick Rakocevic (25)	Mark Barroca (8)	SM Mall of Asia Arena	1–0

October: 4–1

Game	Date	Opponent	Score	High points	High rebounds	High assists	Location Attendance	Record
2	October 1, 2022	Converge	W 109–105	Nick Rakocevic (21)	Nick Rakocevic (24)	Jio Jalalon (6)	Smart Araneta Coliseum	2–0
3	October 5, 2022	TNT	W 94–92	Calvin Abueva (25)	Nick Rakocevic (15)	Mark Barroca (5)	Smart Araneta Coliseum	3–0
4	October 12, 2022	NLEX	W 111–97	Nick Rakocevic (36)	Nick Rakocevic (15)	Jio Jalalon (8)	Smart Araneta Coliseum	4–0
5	October 16, 2022	NorthPort	W 109–91	Nick Rakocevic (26)	Nick Rakocevic (14)	Mark Barroca (8)	Smart Araneta Coliseum	5–0
6	October 23, 2022	Barangay Ginebra	L 97–103	Paul Lee (22)	Nick Rakocevic (17)	Nick Rakocevic (6)	SM Mall of Asia Arena; 12,087	5–1

November: 4–1

Game	Date	Opponent	Score	High points	High rebounds	High assists	Location Attendance	Record
7	November 6, 2022	Blackwater	W 91–69	Rakocevic, Sangalang (17)	Nick Rakocevic (15)	Jio Jalalon (9)	Smart Araneta Coliseum; 10,149	6–1
8	November 12, 2022	Phoenix Super LPG	W 90–80	Nick Rakocevic (18)	Nick Rakocevic (18)	Jio Jalalon (9)	Ynares Center	7–1
9	November 16, 2022	San Miguel	W 85–80	Nick Rakocevic (26)	Nick Rakocevic (28)	Mark Barroca (4)	Smart Araneta Coliseum	8–1
10	November 19, 2022	Bay Area	L 89–95	Nick Rakocevic (26)	Nick Rakocevic (19)	Mark Barroca (8)	PhilSports Arena	8–2
11	November 27, 2022	Meralco	W 108–96	Paul Lee (27)	Nick Rakocevic (20)	Mark Barroca (6)	PhilSports Arena	9–2

December: 1–0

Game	Date	Opponent	Score	High points	High rebounds	High assists	Location Attendance	Record
12	December 2, 2022	Rain or Shine	W 106–90	Nick Rakocevic (21)	Nick Rakocevic (13)	Jio Jalalon (12)	PhilSports Arena	10–2

=== Playoffs ===
==== Bracket ====
Quarterfinals
(#1 twice-to-beat)
1	Bay Area	126
8	Rain or Shine	96
(best-of-3)
4	Converge	0
5	San Miguel	2
(#2 twice-to-beat)
2	Magnolia	102
7	Phoenix Super LPG	95
(best-of-3)
3	Barangay Ginebra	2
6	NorthPort	0

Semifinals (Best-of-5)
1	Bay Area	3
5	San Miguel	1
2	Magnolia	1
3	Barangay Ginebra	3

Finals (Best-of-7)
1	Bay Area	3
3	Barangay Ginebra	4

==== Game log ====
2022–23 PBA Commissioner's Cup playoffs game log
Total: 2–3
Quarterfinals: 1–0

Game	Date	Opponent	Score	High points	High rebounds	High assists	Location Attendance	Series
1	December 9, 2022	Phoenix Super LPG	W 102–95	Calvin Abueva (19)	Nick Rakocevic (13)	Mark Barroca (5)	PhilSports Arena	1–0

Semifinals: 1–3

Game	Date	Opponent	Score	High points	High rebounds	High assists	Location Attendance	Series
1	December 14, 2022	Barangay Ginebra	L 84–87	Paul Lee (21)	Calvin Abueva (12)	Mark Barroca (9)	PhilSports Arena	0–1
2	December 16, 2022	Barangay Ginebra	W 96–95	Paul Lee (24)	Nick Rakocevic (20)	Jio Jalalon (5)	PhilSports Arena	1–1
3	December 18, 2022	Barangay Ginebra	L 80–103	Jio Jalalon (16)	Nick Rakocevic (12)	Barroca, Jalalon (6)	PhilSports Arena	1–2
4	December 21, 2022	Barangay Ginebra	L 84–99	Calvin Abueva (14)	Nick Rakocevic (13)	Jio Jalalon (9)	SM Mall of Asia Arena	1–3

== Governors' Cup ==
=== Eliminations ===
==== Standings ====
Pos	Team	W	L	PCT	GB	Qualification
1	TNT Tropang Giga	10	1	.909	—	Twice-to-beat in quarterfinals
2	San Miguel Beermen	9	2	.818	1	Twice-to-beat in quarterfinals
3	Barangay Ginebra San Miguel	8	3	.727	2	Twice-to-beat in quarterfinals
4	Meralco Bolts	7	4	.636 (Note: Head-to-head quotient: Meralco 1.099, Magnolia 1.0741, NLEX 0.86)	3	Twice-to-beat in quarterfinals
5	Magnolia Chicken Timplados Hotshots	7	4	.636	3	Twice-to-win in quarterfinals
6	NLEX Road Warriors	7	4	.636	3	Twice-to-win in quarterfinals
7	Converge FiberXers	6	5	.545	4	Twice-to-win in quarterfinals
8	Phoenix Super LPG Fuel Masters	4	7	.364	6	Twice-to-win in quarterfinals
9	NorthPort Batang Pier	3	8	.273	7	
10	Rain or Shine Elasto Painters	2	9	.182	8	
11	Terrafirma Dyip	2	9	.182	8	
12	Blackwater Bossing	1	10	.091	9	

Source: PBA.ph
Rules for classification: 1) winning percentage; 2) if two teams are tied, head-to-head record; if three or more teams are tied, head-to-head goal average (quotient); if tied for 8th, one-game playoff; 3) overall quotient; 4) coin toss

==== Game log ====
2023 PBA Governors' Cup game log
Total: 7–4
January: 0–1

Game	Date	Opponent	Score	High points	High rebounds	High assists	Location Attendance	Record
1	January 29	Converge	L 109–111	Erik McCree (38)	Erik McCree (16)	Jio Jalalon (5)	Ynares Center	0–1

February: 4–3

Game	Date	Opponent	Score	High points	High rebounds	High assists	Location Attendance	Record
2	February 3	TNT	L 85–93	Paul Lee (24)	Erik McCree (16)	Calvin Abueva (5)	Ynares Center	0–2
3	February 5	San Miguel	L 98–100	Paul Lee (19)	Erik McCree (8)	Mark Barroca (7)	Smart Araneta Coliseum; 10,080	0–3
4	February 10	Phoenix Super LPG	W 108–95	Antonio Hester (28)	Antonio Hester (12)	Hester, Jalalon (6)	SM Mall of Asia Arena	1–3
5	February 12	Barangay Ginebra	W 118–88	Antonio Hester (28)	Antonio Hester (18)	Antonio Hester (9)	SM Mall of Asia Arena; 11,212	2–3
6	February 16	NLEX	W 119–103	Antonio Hester (37)	Antonio Hester (15)	Jio Jalalon (12)	Smart Araneta Coliseum	3–3
7	February 22	Rain or Shine	W 112–97	Barroca, Jalalon, Lee (19)	Antonio Hester (15)	Hester, Lee (5)	PhilSports Arena	4–3
8	February 26	Meralco	L 84–86	Antonio Hester (23)	Antonio Hester (15)	Abueva, Lee (5)	Smart Araneta Coliseum	4–4

March: 3–0

Game	Date	Opponent	Score	High points	High rebounds	High assists	Location Attendance	Record
9	March 2	NorthPort	W 129–109	Antonio Hester (28)	Antonio Hester (14)	Mark Barroca (8)	Smart Araneta Coliseum	5–4
10	March 4	Terrafirma	W 121–115 (OT)	Antonio Hester (40)	Abueva, Hester (17)	Jio Jalalon (9)	PhilSports Arena	6–4
11	March 8	Blackwater	W 110–95	Calvin Abueva (27)	Antonio Hester (20)	Jio Jalalon (11)	Ynares Center	7–4

=== Playoffs ===
==== Bracket ====
Quarterfinals (Top 4 twice-to-beat)
1	TNT	132
8	Phoenix Super LPG	105
4	Meralco	113*
5	Magnolia	107
2	San Miguel	121
7	Converge	105
3	Barangay Ginebra	127
6	NLEX	93

Semifinals (Best-of-5)
1	TNT	3
4	Meralco	1
2	San Miguel	0
3	Barangay Ginebra	3

Finals (Best-of-7)
1	TNT	4
3	Barangay Ginebra	2

*Game went into overtime

==== Game log ====
2023 PBA Governors' Cup playoffs game log
Total: 0–1
Quarterfinals: 0–1

Game	Date	Opponent	Score	High points	High rebounds	High assists	Location Attendance	Series
1	March 22	Meralco	L 107–113 (OT)	Paul Lee (22)	Antonio Hester (19)	Calvin Abueva (4)	Smart Araneta Coliseum	0–1

== Transactions ==
=== Free agency ===
==== Signings ====
Player	Date signed	Contract amount	Contract length	Former team
Loren Brill	May 29, 2022	Not disclosed	1 year	Re-signed
Ronnie De Leon	May 29, 2022	Not disclosed	1 year	Re-signed

=== Recruited imports ===
Tournament	Name	Debuted	Last game	Record
Commissioner's Cup	Nick Rakocevic	September 28, 2022 (vs. Terrafirma)	December 21, 2022 (vs. Barangay Ginebra)	12–5
Governors' Cup	Erik McCree	January 29, 2023 (vs. Converge)	February 5, 2023 (vs. San Miguel)	0–3
Governors' Cup	Antonio Hester	February 10, 2023 (vs. Phoenix)	March 22, 2023 (vs. Meralco)	7–2

== Awards ==
Recipient	Honors	Date awarded
Paul Lee	2023 PBA All-Star Game Most Valuable Player	March 12, 2023
Calvin Abueva	2022–23 PBA Mythical Second Team	November 5, 2023
Jio Jalalon	2022–23 PBA All-Defensive Team	November 5, 2023
Jio Jalalon	2022–23 PBA Defensive Player of the Year	November 19, 2023
