= 2023 PBA Governors' Cup finals =

2023 edition of the PBA Governors' Cup finals

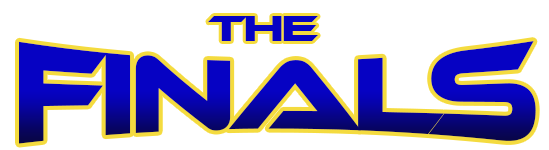
Team	Coach	Wins
(1) TNT Tropang Giga	Jojo Lastimosa	4
(3) Barangay Ginebra San Miguel	Tim Cone	2
- Dates: April 9–21, 2023
- MVP: Mikey Williams (TNT Tropang Giga)
- Television: Local: One Sports; TV5; PBA Rush (HD); International: AksyonTV International iWantTFC (Note: Live on iWantTFC worldwide excluding Philippines and United States)
- Announcers: see Broadcast notes
- Radio network: Radyo Pilipinas 2 (DZSR)
- Announcers: see Broadcast notes

Referees
- Game 1: Peter Balao, Rommel Gruta, Mike Flordeliza, Jonathan Tangkion
- Game 2: Jimmy Mariano, Rommel Gruta, Jerry Narandan, Don Al de Dios
- Game 3: Nol Quilinguen, Peter Balao, Sherwin Pineda, Erwin Traballo
- Game 4: Jimmy Mariano, Sherwin Pineda, Joel Baldago, Jonathan Tangkion
- Game 5: Jimmy Mariano, Rommel Gruta, Jerry Narandan, Don Al de Dios
- Game 6: Nol Quilinguen, Jimmy Mariano, Rommel Gruta, Jonathan Tangkion

PBA Governors' Cup finals chronology
- < 2021 2024 >

PBA finals chronology
- < 2022–23 Commissioner's 2023–24 >

The 2023 Philippine Basketball Association (PBA) Governors' Cup finals was the best-of-7 championship series for the 2023 PBA Governors' Cup. It marked the end of the conference's playoffs and 2022–23 PBA season.

The TNT Tropang Giga and the Barangay Ginebra San Miguel competed for the 21st Governors' Cup championship and the 133rd overall championship contested by the league. This was the first time that TNT and Barangay Ginebra competed for the Governors' Cup championship. The last time that these 2 teams met in the finals was on the 2020 PBA Philippine Cup where Barangay Ginebra defeated TNT in 5 games, 4–1.

TNT defeated Barangay Ginebra in six games to win their first Governors' Cup in franchise history. Mikey Williams was named the finals' MVP.

== Background ==
=== Road to the finals ===
TNT Tropang Giga		Barangay Ginebra San Miguel
Finished 10–1 (.909) in 1st place	Elimination round	Finished 8–3 (.727) in 3rd place
Def. Phoenix in one game (twice-to-beat advantage)	Quarterfinals	Def. NLEX in one game (twice-to-beat advantage)
Def. Meralco, 3–1	Semifinals	Def. San Miguel, 3–0

=== Head-to-head matchup ===
One Sports

March 17
5:45 pm

Box score

TNT Tropang Giga 114, Barangay Ginebra San Miguel 105
Scoring by quarter: 23–27, 24–29, 35–37, 32–12
Pts: Hollis-Jefferson 34; Rebs: Hollis-Jefferson 11; Asts: M. Williams 6	Pts: Brownlee 27; Rebs: Standhardinger 13; Asts: Thompson 10

PhilSports Arena, Pasig
Referees: Sherwin Pineda, Rommel Gruta, Jerry Narandan, Erwin Traballo

== Series summary ==
Game	Date	Venue	Winner	Result
Game 1	April 9	Smart Araneta Coliseum	Barangay Ginebra	102–90
Game 2	April 12	Smart Araneta Coliseum	TNT	95–82
Game 3	April 14	Smart Araneta Coliseum	Barangay Ginebra	117–103
Game 4	April 16	Smart Araneta Coliseum	TNT	116–104
Game 5	April 19	Smart Araneta Coliseum	TNT	104–95
Game 6	April 21	Smart Araneta Coliseum	TNT	97–93

== Game summaries ==
=== Game 1 ===
TV5

April 9
6:00 pm

Box score

TNT Tropang Giga 90, Barangay Ginebra San Miguel 102
Scoring by quarter: 20–29, 23–21, 19–24, 28–28
Pts: Hollis-Jefferson 30; Rebs: Hollis-Jefferson 20; Asts: Hollis-Jefferson 5	Pts: Brownlee 31; Rebs: Thompson 13; Asts: Thompson 11
Barangay Ginebra leads series, 1–0

Smart Araneta Coliseum, Quezon City
Attendance: 11,580
Referees: Peter Balao, Rommel Gruta, Mike Flordeliza, Jonathan Tangkion

=== Game 2 ===
TV5

April 12
5:45 pm

Box score

TNT Tropang Giga 95, Barangay Ginebra San Miguel 82
Scoring by quarter: 27–16, 24–23, 16–25, 28–18
Pts: Hollis-Jefferson 23; Rebs: Hollis-Jefferson 19; Asts: Hollis-Jefferson 9	Pts: Standhardinger 29; Rebs: Standhardinger 11; Asts: Brownlee 8
Series tied, 1–1

Smart Araneta Coliseum, Quezon City
Referees: Jimmy Mariano, Rommel Gruta, Jerry Narandan, Don Al de Dios

=== Game 3 ===
TV5

April 14
5:45 pm

Box score

TNT Tropang Giga 103, Barangay Ginebra San Miguel 117
Scoring by quarter: 19–29, 38–28, 24–30, 22–30
Pts: Hollis-Jefferson 32; Rebs: Hollis-Jefferson 10; Asts: Hollis-Jefferson 6	Pts: Brownlee 29; Rebs: Malonzo, Standhardinger 10; Asts: Thompson 10
Barangay Ginebra leads series, 2–1

Smart Araneta Coliseum, Quezon City
Referees: Nol Quilinguen, Peter Balao, Sherwin Pineda, Erwin Traballo

=== Game 4 ===
Prior to the game, Barangay Ginebra's Christian Standhardinger was awarded his second Best Player of the Conference award, while TNT's Rondae Hollis-Jefferson was awarded the Best Import of the Conference award.

TV5

April 16
6:00pm

Box score

TNT Tropang Giga 116, Barangay Ginebra San Miguel 104
Scoring by quarter: 29–23, 30–18, 36–36, 21–27
Pts: Hollis-Jefferson 36; Rebs: Hollis-Jefferson 10; Asts: Hollis-Jefferson 5	Pts: Brownlee 28; Rebs: Thompson 9 Asts: Standhardinger 9
Series tied, 2–2

Smart Araneta Coliseum, Quezon City
Attendance: 16,203
Referees: Jimmy Mariano, Sherwin Pineda, Joel Baldago, Jonathan Tangkion

=== Game 5 ===
TV5

April 19
5:45 pm

Box score

TNT Tropang Giga 104, Barangay Ginebra San Miguel 95
Scoring by quarter: 28–26, 21–35, 32–18, 23–16
Pts: Hollis-Jefferson 32; Rebs: Hollis-Jefferson 16; Asts: Hollis-Jefferson 10	Pts: Standhardinger 29; Rebs: Standhardinger 13; Asts: Thompson 6
TNT leads series, 3–2

Smart Araneta Coliseum, Quezon City
Attendance: 10,070
Referees: Jimmy Mariano, Rommel Gruta, Jerry Narandan, Don Al de Dios

=== Game 6 ===
TV5

April 21
5:45 pm

Box score

TNT Tropang Giga 97, Barangay Ginebra San Miguel 93
Scoring by quarter: 20–27, 28–24, 29–22, 20–20
Pts: M. Williams 38; Rebs: Hollis-Jefferson 14; Asts: Hollis-Jefferson 6	Pts: Brownlee 29; Rebs: Brownlee 12; Asts: Thompson 9
TNT wins series, 4–2

Smart Araneta Coliseum, Quezon City
Attendance: 13,588
Referees: Nol Quilinguen, Jimmy Mariano, Rommel Gruta, Jonathan Tangkion

== Rosters ==
TNT Tropang Giga roster
Players
Coaches

Pos.	#	POB	Name	Height	Weight	DOB (YYYY–MM–DD)	From
C	1	(Philippines)	Justin Chua (injured)	6 ft 6 in (1.98 m)	232 lb (105 kg)	1989–07–13	Ateneo
F	2	(Philippines)	Carl Bryan Cruz	6 ft 4 in (1.93 m)	200 lb (91 kg)	1991–08–21	Far Eastern
G	5	(United States)	Mikey Williams	6 ft 2 in (1.88 m)	190 lb (86 kg)	1991–10–27	Cal State Fullerton
C	6	(Philippines)	Rey Mark Acuno	6 ft 7 in (2.01 m)	226 lb (103 kg)	1994–08–29	UE
C	7	(Philippines)	Poy Erram	6 ft 8 in (2.03 m)	227 lb (103 kg)	1989–07–07	Ateneo
F	8	(Philippines)	Calvin Oftana	6 ft 5 in (1.96 m)	196 lb (89 kg)	1996–01–03	San Beda
G/F	9	(United States)	Paul Varilla	6 ft 3 in (1.91 m)		1993–08–10	UE
G/F	11	(Philippines)	Jaydee Tungcab (R)	6 ft 3 in (1.91 m)	196 lb (89 kg)	1997–05–05	Philippines
F	12	(Philippines)	Glenn Khobuntin	6 ft 4 in (1.93 m)	195 lb (88 kg)	1991–09–07	National-U
F	14	(United States)	Rondae Hollis-Jefferson (I)	6 ft 6 in (1.98 m)	217 lb (98 kg)	1995–01–03	Arizona
G	15	(Philippines)	Kib Montalbo	6 ft 0 in (1.83 m)	155 lb (70 kg)	1996–04–02	De La Salle
G/F	16	(Philippines)	Roger Pogoy	6 ft 2 in (1.88 m)	180 lb (82 kg)	1992–06–16	Far Eastern
G	17	(Philippines)	Jayson Castro	5 ft 10 in (1.78 m)	185 lb (84 kg)	1986–06–30	Philippine Christian
F/C	21	(United States)	Kelly Williams (C)	6 ft 6 in (1.98 m)	215 lb (98 kg)	1982–02–07	Oakland
F/C	22	(Philippines)	Dave Marcelo	6 ft 5 in (1.96 m)	223 lb (101 kg)	1989–02–22	San Beda
G/F	24	(Philippines)	Matt Ganuelas-Rosser	6 ft 4 in (1.93 m)	186 lb (84 kg)	1990–06–13	Cal Poly Pomona

Head coach

- (Philippines) Jojo Lastimosa

Assistant coach(es)

- (Philippines) Joshua Reyes (1st assistant)
- (Philippines) Sandy Arespacochaga
- (Philippines) Mau Belen
- (Philippines) Ranidel de Ocampo
- (Philippines) Yuri Escueta
- (Philippines) Bong Ravena
- (Serbia) Slavoljub Gorunovic (active consultant)
- (Philippines) Chot Reyes (senior consultant)

Team manager

- (Philippines) Jojo Lastimosa
- (Philippines) Miguel Fernandez (assistant)

Legend

- (C) Team captain
- (CI) Commissioner's Cup Import
- (GI) Governors' Cup Import
- (EI) EASL Import
- (DP) Unsigned draft pick
- (FA) Free agent
- (IN) Inactive
- (S) Suspended
- (R) Rookie
- Injured

Roster

Barangay Ginebra San Miguel roster
Players
Coaches

Pos.	#	POB	Name	Height	Weight	DOB (YYYY–MM–DD)	From
G/F	0	(United States)	Jeremiah Gray (R)	6 ft 5 in (1.96 m)	205 lb (93 kg)	1996–08–16	Dominican (CA)
F	2	(United States)	Jared Dillinger	6 ft 4 in (1.93 m)	220 lb (100 kg)	1984–01–06	Hawaiʻi
F	3	(United States)	Jamie Malonzo	6 ft 6 in (1.98 m)	210 lb (95 kg)	1996–07–31	De La Salle
G	5	(Philippines)	LA Tenorio (injured) (C)	5 ft 9 in (1.75 m)	151 lb (68 kg)	1984–07–09	Ateneo
G	9	(Philippines)	Scottie Thompson	6 ft 1 in (1.85 m)	180 lb (82 kg)	1993–07–12	UPHSD
G	11	(United States)	Stanley Pringle	6 ft 1 in (1.85 m)	190 lb (86 kg)	1987–03–05	Penn State
G	17	(Philippines)	John Pinto	5 ft 11 in (1.80 m)	170 lb (77 kg)	1990–10–15	Arellano
G/F	19	(Philippines)	Von Pessumal	6 ft 2 in (1.88 m)	185 lb (84 kg)	1993–02–12	Ateneo
F/C	23	(Philippines)	Raymond Aguilar	6 ft 4 in (1.93 m)	200 lb (91 kg)	1985–07–27	National-U
G/F	24	(Philippines)	Jayson David (R)	6 ft 2 in (1.88 m)	191 lb (87 kg)	1996–11–08	Lyceum
C	25	(Philippines)	Japeth Aguilar	6 ft 9 in (2.06 m)	235 lb (107 kg)	1987–01–25	Western Kentucky
F	27	(Philippines)	Sidney Onwubere	6 ft 4 in (1.93 m)		1993–08–01	Emilio Aguinaldo
F	31	(Philippines)	Aljon Mariano	6 ft 3 in (1.91 m)	175 lb (79 kg)	1992–08–03	UST
F	32	(United States)	Justin Brownlee (I)	6 ft 6 in (1.98 m)	220 lb (100 kg)	1988–04–23	St. John's
F/C	34	(Germany)	Christian Standhardinger	6 ft 8 in (2.03 m)	220 lb (100 kg)	1989–07–04	Hawaiʻi

Head coach

- (United States) Tim Cone

Assistant coach(es)

- (Philippines) Richard del Rosario (1st assistant)
- (Philippines) Olsen Racela
- (Philippines) Freddie Abuda
- (United States) Kirk Collier
- (Philippines) Patrick Partosa
- (Philippines) LA Tenorio

Team manager

- (Philippines) Alfrancis Chua^{[a]}
- (Philippines) Raymond Rodriguez (assistant)

Legend

- (C) Team captain
- (CI) Commissioner's Cup Import
- (GI) Governors' Cup Import
- (EI) EASL Import
- (DP) Unsigned draft pick
- (FA) Free agent
- (IN) Inactive
- (S) Suspended
- (R) Rookie
- Injured

Roster

- ^{a} Also serves as Barangay Ginebra's board governor.

== Broadcast notes ==
The Governors' Cup finals was aired on TV5 & One Sports with simulcast on PBA Rush, SMART Sports on Facebook and Radyo Pilipinas 2 918khz (both in standard and high definition).

The PBA Rush broadcast provided English language coverage of the finals.

The SMART Sports Facebook broadcast provided English-Filipino language coverage of the finals.

Game	TV5 and One Sports			PBA Rush			SMART Sports Facebook			PBA Radio	ShootAround Pre-Game Show / Halftime Show
Game	Play-by-play	Analyst(s)	Courtside Reporters	Play-by-play	Analyst	Courtside Reporters	Play-by-play	Analyst	Courtside Reporters	Radio Commentators	Hosts
Game 1	Magoo Marjon	Quinito Henson and Yeng Guiao	Nadia Miravalles	Carlo Pamintuan	Alex Cabagnot	Bea Escudero	Andre Co	Jolly Escobar	Nadia Miravalles	Jay dela Cruz and Allan Gregorio	Paolo del Rosario and Ronnie Magsanoc
Game 2	Sev Sarmenta	Andy Jao and Gabe Norwood	Apple David	Carlo Pamintuan	Jong Uichico	Aiyana Perlas	Jinno Rufino	Allan Gregorio	Apple David	Benjie Santiago and Beaujing Acot	Nadia Miravalles
Game 3	Charlie Cuna	Ryan Gregorio and Yeng Guiao	Bea Escudero	Miguel Dypiangco	Dominic Uy	Doreen Suaybaguio	Jutt Sulit	Mark Molina	Bea Escudero	Jay dela Cruz and Allan Gregorio	none
Game 4	Jutt Sulit	Dominic Uy and Norman Black	Denise Tan	Carlo Pamintuan	Ryan Gregorio	Belle Gregorio	Jay dela Cruz	Jolly Escobar	Denise Tan	Benjie Santiago and Eric Altamirano	Paolo del Rosario and Ryan Gregorio
Game 5	Magoo Marjon	Quinito Henson and Jeffrey Cariaso	Apple David	Carlo Pamintuan	Andy Jao	Bea Escudero	Chiqui Reyes	Borgie Hermida	Apple David	Jay dela Cruz and Beaujing Acot	Apple David
Game 6	Sev Sarmenta	Dominic Uy and Ryan Gregorio	Denise Tan	Mikee Reyes	Mark Molina	Doreen Suaybaguio	Anthony Suntay	Jude Roque	Denise Tan	Benjie Santiago and Allan Gregorio	Denise Tan

- Additional Game 6 crew:
  - Trophy presentation: Carlo Pamintuan and Bea Escudero
  - Celebration interviewer: Denise Tan and Doreen Suaybaguio
