= 2022–23 PBA Commissioner's Cup finals =

Philippine Basketball Association tournament

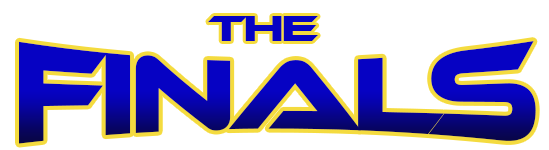
Team	Coach	Wins
(3) Barangay Ginebra San Miguel	Tim Cone	4
(1) Bay Area Dragons	Brian Goorjian	3
- Dates: December 25, 2022 – January 15, 2023
- MVP: Christian Standhardinger (Barangay Ginebra San Miguel)
- Television: Local: One Sports; TV5; PBA Rush (HD); International: AksyonTV International iWantTFC (Note: Live on iWantTFC worldwide excluding Philippines and United States)
- Announcers: see Broadcast notes
- Radio network: Radyo5 (DWFM)
- Announcers: see Broadcast notes

Referees
- Game 1: Jimmy Mariano, Sherwin Pineda, Albert Nubla, Niño Cortez
- Game 2: Rommel Gruta, Bing Oliva, Jerry Narandan, Joel Baldago
- Game 3: Nol Quilinguen, Sherwin Pineda, Mike Flordeliza, Niño Barcenas
- Game 4: Rommel Gruta, Bing Oliva, Janine Nicandro, Niño Cortez
- Game 5: Jimmy Mariano, Rommel Gruta, Albert Nubla, Jeff Tantay
- Game 6: Nol Quilinguen, Mike Flordeliza, Jerry Narandan, Joel Baldago
- Game 7: Nol Quilinguen, Rommel Gruta, Mike Flordeliza, Jerry Narandan

PBA Commissioner's Cup finals chronology
- < 2019 2023–24 >

PBA finals chronology
- < 2022 Philippine 2023 Governors' >

The 2022–23 Philippine Basketball Association (PBA) Commissioner's Cup finals was the best-of-7 championship series of the 2022–23 PBA Commissioner's Cup, and the conclusion of the conference's playoffs. The Barangay Ginebra San Miguel and guest team Bay Area Dragons competed for the 20th Commissioner's Cup championship and the 132nd overall championship contested by the league.

The Bay Area Dragons were the first guest team since 1980 to appear in the PBA finals, while this was the second time in the past three Commissioner's Cup tournaments that Barangay Ginebra appeared in a Commissioner's Cup finals; they previously won the title in 2018 where they defeated the San Miguel Beermen in six games. Barangay Ginebra defeated Bay Area in seven games to claim their third Commissioner's Cup title in franchise history. Christian Standhardinger was named the finals MVP for this series.

== Background ==
=== Road to the finals ===
Barangay Ginebra San Miguel		Bay Area Dragons
Finished 9–3 (.750) in 3rd place	Elimination round	Finished 10–2 (.833) in 1st place with Magnolia
—	Tiebreaker	Head-to-head record: Bay Area 1–0 Magnolia (1st place)
Def. NorthPort, 2–0 (best-of-three)	Quarterfinals	Def. Rain or Shine in one game (twice-to-beat advantage)
Def. Magnolia, 3–1	Semifinals	Def. San Miguel, 3–1

=== Head-to-head matchup ===
TV5

October 9, 2022
6:45 pm

Box score

Barangay Ginebra San Miguel 111, Bay Area Dragons 93
Scoring by quarter: 26–28, 24–20, 35–18, 26–27
Pts: Brownlee 46; Rebs: Brownlee 12; Asts: Thompson 5	Pts: Nicholson 28; Rebs: Nicholson 12; Asts: Yang 4

PhilSports Arena, Pasig
Referees: Nol Quilinguen, Rommel Gruta, Mao Orioste, Kenny Hallig

== Series summary ==
Game	Date	Venue	Winner	Result
Game 1	December 25, 2022	SM Mall of Asia Arena	Barangay Ginebra	96–81
Game 2	December 28, 2022	Smart Araneta Coliseum	Bay Area	99–82
Game 3	January 4, 2023	SM Mall of Asia Arena	Barangay Ginebra	89–82
Game 4	January 6, 2023	SM Mall of Asia Arena	Bay Area	94–86
Game 5	January 8, 2023	SM Mall of Asia Arena	Barangay Ginebra	101–91
Game 6	January 11, 2023	Smart Araneta Coliseum	Bay Area	87–84
Game 7	January 15, 2023	Philippine Arena	Barangay Ginebra	114–99

== Game summaries ==
=== Game 1 ===
TV5

December 25, 2022
5:00 pm

Box score

Barangay Ginebra San Miguel 96, Bay Area Dragons 81
Scoring by quarter: 22–25, 23–15, 27–24, 24–17
Pts: Brownlee 28; Rebs: Brownlee 13; Asts: Brownlee, Thompson 6	Pts: Nicholson 27; Rebs: Nicholson 12; Asts: Lam 6
Barangay Ginebra leads series, 1–0

SM Mall of Asia Arena, Pasay
Attendance: 18,252
Referees: Jimmy Mariano, Sherwin Pineda, Albert Nubla, Niño Cortez

=== Game 2 ===
TV5

December 28, 2022
5:45 pm

Box score

Barangay Ginebra San Miguel 82, Bay Area Dragons 99
Scoring by quarter: 16–22, 19–30, 25–16, 22–31
Pts: Brownlee 32; Rebs: Brownlee 11; Asts: Pinto, Tenorio 4	Pts: Nicholson 30; Rebs: Nicholson 15; Asts: Yang 8
Series tied, 1–1

Smart Araneta Coliseum, Quezon City
Attendance: 16,044
Referees: Rommel Gruta, Bing Oliva, Jerry Narandan, Joel Baldago

=== Game 3 ===
TV5

January 4, 2023
5:45 pm

Box score

Barangay Ginebra San Miguel 89, Bay Area Dragons 82
Scoring by quarter: 16–16, 19–21, 21–26, 33–19
Pts: Brownlee 34; Rebs: Brownlee 17; Asts: Brownlee, Thompson 4	Pts: Nicholson 23; Rebs: Nicholson 24; Asts: Yang 6
Barangay Ginebra leads series, 2–1

SM Mall of Asia Arena, Pasay
Attendance: 15,004
Referees: Nol Quilinguen, Sherwin Pineda, Mike Flordeliza, Niño Barcenas

=== Game 4 ===
TV5

January 6, 2023
5:45 pm

Box score

Barangay Ginebra San Miguel 86, Bay Area Dragons 94
Scoring by quarter: 19–19, 27–19, 15–22, 25–34
Pts: Brownlee 23; Rebs: Brownlee 13; Asts: Brownlee 11	Pts: Lam 30; Rebs: Lam, Zhu 9 Asts: three players 4
Series tied, 2–2

SM Mall of Asia Arena, Pasay
Attendance: 17,236
Referees: Rommel Gruta, Bing Oliva, Janine Nicandro, Niño Cortez

Prior to the game, Barangay Ginebra's Scottie Thompson was awarded his second Best Player of the Conference award, and Barangay Ginebra import and Thompson's teammate Justin Brownlee was awarded the Best Import of the Conference award for the third time.

=== Game 5 ===
TV5

January 8, 2023
5:45 pm

Box score

Barangay Ginebra San Miguel 101, Bay Area Dragons 91
Scoring by quarter: 23–24, 31–19, 22–19, 25–29
Pts: Brownlee 37; Rebs: Brownlee, Malonzo 8 Asts: Thompson 8	Pts: Blankley 29; Rebs: Liu 11; Asts: Song 5
Barangay Ginebra leads series, 3–2

SM Mall of Asia Arena, Pasay
Attendance: 21,823
Referees: Jimmy Mariano, Rommel Gruta, Albert Nubla, Jeff Tantay

=== Game 6 ===
TV5

January 11, 2023
5:45 pm

Box score

Barangay Ginebra San Miguel 84, Bay Area Dragons 87
Scoring by quarter: 20–25, 22–25, 22–16, 20–21
Pts: Brownlee 37; Rebs: Brownlee 10; Asts: Brownlee 11	Pts: Powell 29; Rebs: Reid 12; Asts: Zhu 10
Series tied, 3–3

Smart Araneta Coliseum, Quezon City
Attendance: 22,361
Referees: Nol Quilinguen, Mike Flordeliza, Jerry Narandan, Joel Baldago

A day before the game, Bay Area's second import Myles Powell was reactivated in lieu of Andrew Nicholson who missed both games 4 and 5 due to an injury sustained during game 3.

=== Game 7 ===
TV5

January 15, 2023
5:45 pm

Box score

Barangay Ginebra San Miguel 114, Bay Area Dragons 99
Scoring by quarter: 27–21, 34–18, 34–35, 19–25
Pts: Brownlee 34; Rebs: Malonzo 17; Asts: Brownlee 12	Pts: Powell 29; Rebs: Liu 13; Asts: Powell 5
Barangay Ginebra wins series, 4–3

Philippine Arena, Bocaue, Bulacan
Attendance: 54,589
Referees: Nol Quilinguen, Rommel Gruta, Mike Flordeliza, Jerry Narandan

The game was initially scheduled on January 13, 2023, but was moved to January 15 due to 'popular demand'.

On January 12, long-time Barangay Ginebra import Justin Brownlee became a naturalized Filipino citizen.

The game set the highest attendance ever in a PBA finals game with 54,589.

== Rosters ==
Barangay Ginebra San Miguel roster
Players
Coaches

Pos.	#	POB	Name	Height	Weight	DOB (YYYY–MM–DD)	From
G/F	0	(United States)	Jeremiah Gray (R)	6 ft 5 in (1.96 m)	205 lb (93 kg)	1996–08–16	Dominican (CA)
F	2	(United States)	Jared Dillinger	6 ft 4 in (1.93 m)	220 lb (100 kg)	1984–01–06	Hawaiʻi
F	3	(United States)	Jamie Malonzo	6 ft 6 in (1.98 m)	210 lb (95 kg)	1996–07–31	De La Salle
G	5	(Philippines)	LA Tenorio (C)	5 ft 9 in (1.75 m)	151 lb (68 kg)	1984–07–09	Ateneo
G	9	(Philippines)	Scottie Thompson	6 ft 1 in (1.85 m)	180 lb (82 kg)	1993–07–12	UPHSD
G	11	(United States)	Stanley Pringle	6 ft 1 in (1.85 m)	190 lb (86 kg)	1987–03–05	Penn State
G	17	(Philippines)	John Pinto	5 ft 11 in (1.80 m)	170 lb (77 kg)	1990–10–15	Arellano
G/F	19	(Philippines)	Von Pessumal	6 ft 2 in (1.88 m)	185 lb (84 kg)	1993–02–12	Ateneo
F/C	23	(Philippines)	Raymond Aguilar	6 ft 4 in (1.93 m)	200 lb (91 kg)	1985–07–27	National-U
G/F	24	(Philippines)	Jayson David (R)	6 ft 2 in (1.88 m)	191 lb (87 kg)	1996–11–08	Lyceum
C	25	(Philippines)	Japeth Aguilar	6 ft 9 in (2.06 m)	235 lb (107 kg)	1987–01–25	Western Kentucky
F	27	(Philippines)	Sidney Onwubere	6 ft 4 in (1.93 m)		1993–08–01	Emilio Aguinaldo
F	31	(Philippines)	Aljon Mariano	6 ft 3 in (1.91 m)	175 lb (79 kg)	1992–08–03	UST
F	32	(United States)	Justin Brownlee (I)	6 ft 6 in (1.98 m)	220 lb (100 kg)	1988–04–23	St. John's
F/C	34	(Germany)	Christian Standhardinger	6 ft 8 in (2.03 m)	220 lb (100 kg)	1989–07–04	Hawaiʻi

Head coach

- (United States) Tim Cone

Assistant coach(es)

- (Philippines) Richard del Rosario (1st assistant)
- (Philippines) Olsen Racela
- (Philippines) Freddie Abuda
- (United States) Kirk Collier
- (Philippines) Patrick Partosa

Team manager

- (Philippines) Alfrancis Chua^{[a]}
- (Philippines) Raymond Rodriguez (assistant)

Legend

- (C) Team captain
- (CI) Commissioner's Cup Import
- (GI) Governors' Cup Import
- (EI) EASL Import
- (DP) Unsigned draft pick
- (FA) Free agent
- (IN) Inactive
- (S) Suspended
- (R) Rookie
- Injured

Roster

- ^{a} Also serves as Barangay Ginebra's board governor.

Bay Area Dragons roster
Players
Coaches

Pos.	#	POB	Name	Height	Weight	DOB (YYYY–MM–DD)	From
G	0	(Hong Kong)	Scotty Ewing	5 ft 9 in (1.75 m)		1991–04–10
G	1	(Hong Kong)	Glen Yang	6 ft 4 in (1.93 m)	190 lb (86 kg)	1996–08–30
F	6	(China)	Si Kun	6 ft 6 in (1.98 m)		1995–02–27
F	8	(China)	Zhu Songwei	6 ft 9 in (2.06 m)	226 lb (103 kg)	1996–11–09
F	9	(China)	Ju Mingxin	6 ft 6 in (1.98 m)	205 lb (93 kg)	1993–03–10
F	11	(Australia)	Hayden Blankley	6 ft 6 in (1.98 m)		2000–07–04
G	13	(United States)	Myles Powell (I)	6 ft 2 in (1.88 m)	195 lb (88 kg)	1997–07–07
G/F	15	(Canada)	Warren Liang	6 ft 5 in (1.96 m)	198 lb (90 kg)	1993–09–19
F	16	(China)	Song Jianhua	6 ft 5 in (1.96 m)	204 lb (93 kg)	1991–01–20
C	21	(China)	Liu Chuanxing	7 ft 5 in (2.26 m)	287 lb (130 kg)	1999–07–30
G/F	22	(Canada)	Kobey Lam	6 ft 3 in (1.91 m)	170 lb (77 kg)	2000–03–02
F	25	(China)	Zheng Qilong	6 ft 8 in (2.03 m)		1996–04–10
C	31	(China)	Zhang Zhiyuan	6 ft 10 in (2.08 m)		1999–05–08
F/C	33	(Hong Kong)	Duncan Reid	6 ft 9 in (2.06 m)	220 lb (100 kg)	1989–09–28
F/C	44	(Canada)	Andrew Nicholson (I)	6 ft 10 in (2.08 m)	250 lb (113 kg)	1989–12–08

Head coach

- (Australia) Brian Goorjian

Assistant coach(es)

- (Philippines) Pocholo Villanueva
- (United States) Bill Tomlinson

Team manager

- (Philippines) Maya Montecillo

Legend

- (C) Team captain
- (CI) Commissioner's Cup Import
- (GI) Governors' Cup Import
- (EI) EASL Import
- (DP) Unsigned draft pick
- (FA) Free agent
- (IN) Inactive
- (S) Suspended
- (R) Rookie
- Injured

== Broadcast notes ==
The Commissioner Cup Finals was aired on TV5 & One Sports with simulcast on PBA Rush, SMART Sports on Facebook, SMART GigaPlay App, and Radyo5 92.3 News FM (both in standard and high definition).

The PBA Rush broadcast provided English language coverage of the Finals.

The SMART Sports Facebook broadcast provided English-Filipino language coverage of the Finals.

Game	TV5 and One Sports			PBA Rush			ShootAround Pre-Game Show	SMART Sports Facebook		
Game	Play-by-play	Analyst(s)	Courtside Reporters	Play-by-play	Analyst(s)	Courtside Reporters	Hosts	Play-by-play	Analyst	Courtside Reporters
Game 1	Magoo Marjon	Joaquin Henson and Norman Black	Apple David	Carlo Pamintuan	Charles Tiu	Belle Gregorio	Paolo del Rosario, Ryan Gregorio and Topex Robinson	Miguel Dypiangco	Eric Altamirano	Apple David
Game 2	Sev Sarmenta	Joaquin Henson and Topex Robinson	Denise Tan	Carlo Pamintuan	Vince Hizon	Aiyana Perlas	Miguel Dypiangco, Ryan Gregorio, and Ronnie Magsanoc	Chiqui Reyes	Jude Roque	Denise Tan
Game 3	Charlie Cuna	Ronnie Magsanoc	Apple David	Carlo Pamintuan	Dominic Uy	Doreen Suaybaguio	Paolo del Rosario, Ryan Gregorio, and Larry Fonacier	Jinno Rufino	Allan Gregorio	Apple David
Game 4	Jutt Sulit	Dominic Uy and Aldin Ayo	Denise Tan	Chiqui Reyes	Eric Reyes	Doreen Suaybaguio	Paolo del Rosario and Ronnie Magsanoc	Carlo Pamintuan	Larry Fonacier	Denise Tan
Game 5	Magoo Marjon	Andy Jao	Apple David	Carlo Pamintuan	Charles Tiu	Belle Gregorio	Paolo del Rosario and Ryan Gregorio	Mikee Reyes	Jolly Escobar	Apple David
Game 6	Sev Sarmenta	Dominic Uy and Yeng Guiao	Denise Tan	Carlo Pamintuan	Andy Jao	Aiyana Perlas	Paolo del Rosario, Ryan Gregorio, and Gabe Norwood	Andre Co	Eric Reyes	Denise Tan
Game 7	Charlie Cuna	Joaquin Henson and Norman Black	Bea Escudero	Carlo Pamintuan	Ryan Gregorio	Belle Gregorio	Paolo del Rosario, Ryan Gregorio, Dominic Uy, and Beau Belga	Mikee Reyes	Allan Gregorio	Bea Escudero

- Additional Game 7 crew:
  - Trophy presentation: Jutt Sulit
  - Celebration interviewer: Bea Escudero and Belle Gregorio
