= EASL Champions Week =

Preseason basketball tournament in Asia

Tournament details
- Country: Japan
- Dates: 1–5 March 2023
- Season: 2023
- Teams: 8

Final positions
- Champions: (South Korea) Anyang KGC
- Runners-up: (South Korea) Seoul SK Knights
- Third place: (Hong Kong) Bay Area Dragons
- Fourth place: (Japan) Ryukyu Golden Kings

Awards
- Best player: (United States) Omari Spellman (Anyang)

The EASL Champions Week was a pre-season tournament of the East Asia Super League, an international basketball club competition involving teams from domestic leagues in Japan, South Korea, Philippines and Taiwan, as well as a franchise team representing Greater China. The Champions Week was held from 1 to 5 March 2023.

The Champions Week was conceptualized after the regular season was postponed. The regular season was originally scheduled to be held from 12 October 2022 to February 2023, under a home and away format and a Final Four knockout stage.

The winners received USD 250,000, while the runners-up and third-place teams received USD 100,000 and USD 50,000, respectively.

== Team allocation ==
The eight teams which qualified for the then-2022–23 EASL season qualified for the Champions Week. Four leagues are represented for the 2023 EASL. The champions and runners-up of the Japan B.League and the Korean Basketball League as well as the champions of Taiwan's P. League+ Hong Kong based Bay Area Chun Yu Phoenixes, a franchise team not part of any domestic league also participated. The league considers the P. League+ champions and the Phoenixes as representatives of "Greater China". For the Philippines, the top two finishing teams of the 2022 PBA Philippine Cup qualified.

League	Country or region	Berths
EASL (franchise team)	Hong Kong	1
P. League+	Chinese Taipei (Note: Taiwan, officially Republic of China. The organizers of the EASL and FIBA uses the designation of "Chinese Taipei".)	1
B.League	Japan	2
Korean Basketball League	South Korea	2
Philippine Basketball Association	Philippines	2

=== Qualified teams ===
Team	Domestic league standing
(Hong Kong) Bay Area Dragons	N/A (EASL franchise)
(Chinese Taipei) Taipei Fubon Braves	2021–22 P. League+ champions
(Japan) Utsunomiya Brex	2021–22 B.League champions
(Japan) Ryukyu Golden Kings	2021–22 B.League runners-up
(South Korea) Seoul SK Knights	2021–22 Korean Basketball League champions
(South Korea) Anyang KGC	2021–22 Korean Basketball League runners-up
(Philippines) San Miguel Beermen	2022 PBA Philippine Cup champions
(Philippines) TNT Tropang Giga	2022 PBA Philippine Cup runners-up

=== Imports ===
Each team can select two foreigners into active roster in each game, plus an Asian heritage import or naturalized player.

Team	Foreigner			Heritage player
(Hong Kong) Bay Area Dragons	(Canada) Andrew Nicholson	(United States) Myles Powell	—N/a	(Philippines) Sedrick Barefield
(Chinese Taipei) Taipei Fubon Braves	(Ukraine) Ihor Zaytsev	(United States) Mike Singletary	(United States) Chris Johnson	—N/a
(Japan) Utsunomiya Brex	(United States) Grant Jerrett	(United States) Josh Scott	—N/a	(South Korea) Yang Jae-min
(Japan) Ryukyu Golden Kings	(United States) Allen Durham	(United States) Jack Cooley	—N/a	(Philippines) Carl Tamayo
(South Korea) Seoul SK Knights	(United States) Leon Williams	(United States) Jameel Warney	—N/a	—N/a
(South Korea) Anyang KGC	(United States) Omari Spellman	(United States) Darryl Monroe	—N/a	(Philippines) Rhenz Abando
(Philippines) San Miguel Beermen	(United States) Cameron Clark	(United States) Jessie Govan	—N/a	—N/a
(Philippines) TNT Tropang Giga	(United States) Jalen Hudson	(Nigeria) Daniel Ochefu	—N/a	—N/a

== Venues ==
Games were held in Japan, on the home venues of the two qualified Japanese teams – Utsunomiya Brex and the Ryukyu Golden Kings. There were ten games in total. Utsunomiya hosted six of the eight group stage games, while Ryukyu hosted the remaining two games, as well as the third place game and final.

Okinawa City	Utsunomiya	EASL Champions Week (Japan)
Okinawa Arena	Nikkan Arena Tochigi	EASL Champions Week (Japan)
Capacity: 10,000	Capacity: 5,000	EASL Champions Week (Japan)

== Draw ==
The official draw for the 2022–23 EASL season was held on 28 June 2022 at the Shangri-La at the Fort, Manila in Taguig. For the Champions Week the groupings were retained.

The teams were drawn in two groups. A coin flipping mechanic was used; each champion in each domestic league was to choose a coin side. The winner of the coin flip was placed on Group A while the other placed in Group B. The identity of the Philippine representatives were yet to be determined at the time of the draw.

Another draw was held to determine the schedule of the games.

== Group stage ==
On 10 January 2023, EASL released the full schedule for the tournament. Each team in each of the two groups would face only two of three of the other teams in their group unlike in a traditional round robin format.

=== Group A ===
Pos	Team	Pld	W	L	PF	PA	PD	Pts	Qualification
1	(South Korea) Anyang KGC	2	2	0	236	156	+80	4 (Note: Anyang KGC +80 PD, Ryukyu Golden Kings +33 PD.)	Final
2	(Japan) Ryukyu Golden Kings	2	2	0	179	146	+33	4	Third place game
3	(Chinese Taipei) Taipei Fubon Braves	2	0	2	147	177	−30	2	
4	(Philippines) San Miguel Beermen	2	0	2	155	238	−83	2	

Source: EASL
Notes:

1 March 2023
17:00

Box score

Taipei Fubon Braves (Chinese Taipei)	69–94	(South Korea) Anyang KGC
Scoring by quarter: 19–24, 17–25, 21–22, 12–23
Pts: Zaytsev 20; Rebs: Singletary 15; Asts: Singletary 6		Pts: Spellman 22; Rebs: Monroe 25; Asts: Monroe 7

Nikkan Arena Tochigi, Utsunomiya

2 March 2023
19:30

Box score

Ryukyu Golden Kings (Japan)	96–68	(Philippines) San Miguel Beermen
Scoring by quarter: 24–17, 25–11, 21–20, 26–20
Pts: Cooley, Imamura 20; Rebs: Cooley, Durham 16; Asts: Durham 7		Pts: Clark 25; Rebs: Tautuaa 10; Asts: Enciso 6

Nikkan Arena Tochigi, Utsunomiya

4 March 2023
16:00

Box score

Anyang KGC (South Korea)	142–87	(Philippines) San Miguel Beermen
Scoring by quarter: 40–20, 29–16, 40–29, 33–22
Pts: Spellman 53; Rebs: Monroe 17; Asts: Monroe 14		Pts: Clark 35; Rebs: Clark 10; Asts: Perez 5

Okinawa Arena, Okinawa City

4 March 2023
19:00

Box score

Ryukyu Golden Kings (Japan)	83–78	(Chinese Taipei) Taipei Fubon Braves
Scoring by quarter: 20–20, 25–25, 23–8, 15–25
Pts: Cooley 24; Rebs: Cooley 13; Asts: Kishimoto 7		Pts: Johnson 28; Rebs: Johnson 9 Asts: Chou, Zaytsev 4

Okinawa Arena, Okinawa City

=== Group B ===
Pos	Team	Pld	W	L	PF	PA	PD	Pts	Qualification
1	(South Korea) Seoul SK Knights	2	2	0	172	153	+19	4	Final
2	(Hong Kong) Bay Area Dragons	2	1	1	180	182	−2	3 (Note: Bay Area Dragons 1–0 Utsunomiya Brex)	Third place game
3	(Japan) Utsunomiya Brex	2	1	1	189	162	+27	3	
4	(Philippines) TNT Tropang Giga	2	0	2	135	179	−44	2	

Source: EASL
Notes:

1 March 2023
19:30

Box score

Utsunomiya Brex (Japan)	99–66	(Philippines) TNT Tropang Giga
Scoring by quarter: 25–26, 32–8, 22–21, 20–11
Pts: Scott 24; Rebs: Scott 14; Asts: Hiejima 6		Pts: Hudson 28; Rebs: Ochefu 9 Asts: Oftana 3

Nikkan Arena Tochigi, Utsunomiya

2 March 2023
17:00

Box score

Seoul SK Knights (South Korea)	92–84	(Hong Kong) Bay Area Dragons
Scoring by quarter: 18–20, 24–27, 22–20, 28–17
Pts: Warney 30; Rebs: Warney 19; Asts: Kim, Warney 7		Pts: Nicholson 35; Rebs: Nicholson 15; Asts: Powell 8

Nikkan Arena Tochigi, Utsunomiya

3 March 2023
17:00

Box score

TNT Tropang Giga (Philippines)	69–80	(South Korea) Seoul SK Knights
Scoring by quarter: 28–25, 14–16, 13–16, 14–23
Pts: Oftana 16; Rebs: Ochefu 12; Asts: M. Williams 4		Pts: Kim, Warney 21; Rebs: Williams 21; Asts: Warney 11

Nikkan Arena Tochigi, Utsunomiya

3 March 2023
19:30

Box score

Utsunomiya Brex (Japan)	90–96	(Hong Kong) Bay Area Dragons
Scoring by quarter: 17–23, 32–24, 16–26, 25–23
Pts: Jerrett 22; Rebs: Scott 12; Asts: Hiejima 7		Pts: Nicholson 26; Rebs: Nicholson 12; Asts: Powell 10

Nikkan Arena Tochigi, Utsunomiya

== Final round ==
=== Third place game ===
5 March 2023
16:00

Box score

Ryukyu Golden Kings (Japan)	70–90	(Hong Kong) Bay Area Dragons
Scoring by quarter: 14–16, 14–28, 23–30, 19–16
Pts: Durham 19; Rebs: Watanabe 8 Asts: Flippin 5		Pts: Powell 29; Rebs: Nicholson 8 Asts: Yang 5

Okinawa Arena, Okinawa City

=== Final ===
5 March 2023
19:00

Box score

Anyang KGC (South Korea)	90–84	(South Korea) Seoul SK Knights
Scoring by quarter: 25–27, 24–10, 17–24, 24–23
Pts: Monroe 21; Rebs: Monroe 16; Asts: Byeon, Monroe 5		Pts: Kim 25; Rebs: Williams 10; Asts: Kim, Oh 6

Okinawa Arena, Okinawa City
