= Daniel Ochefu =

American-born Nigerian basketball player

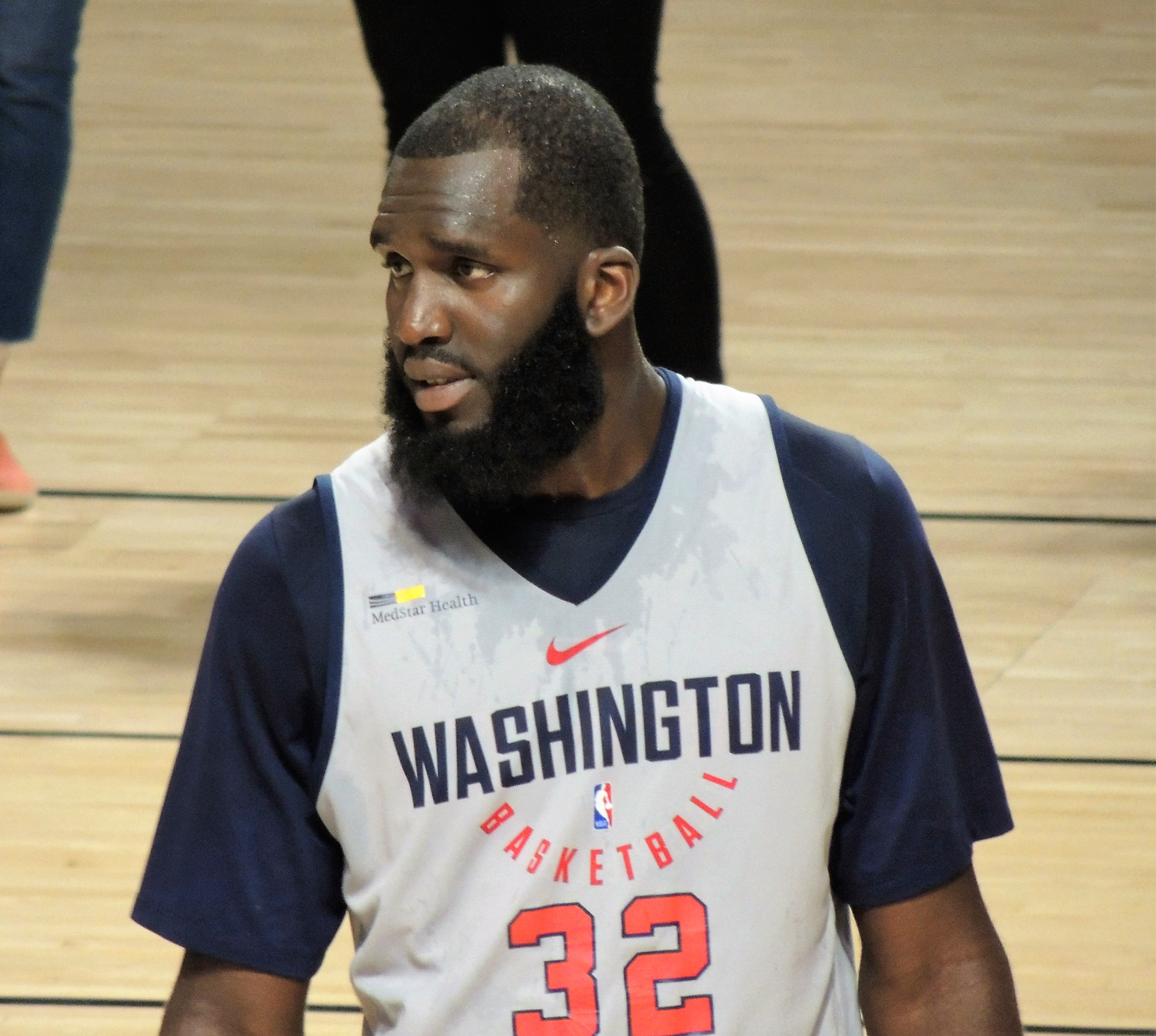
- Ochefu at Washington Wizards training camp in 2017

Free agent
- Position: Center

Personal information
- Born: December 15, 1993 (age 32) Baltimore, Maryland, U.S.
- Listed height: 6 ft 11 in (2.11 m)
- Listed weight: 245 lb (111 kg)

Career information
- High school: Westtown (Westtown Township, Pennsylvania); Downingtown East (Downingtown, Pennsylvania)
- College: Villanova (2012–2016)
- NBA draft: 2016: undrafted
- Playing career: 2016–present

Career history
- 2016–2017: Washington Wizards
- 2017: Maine Red Claws
- 2017–2018: Windy City Bulls
- 2018–2019: Reno Bighorns / Stockton Kings
- 2019: Breogán
- 2019–2020: Ibaraki Robots
- 2021–2022: Seoul Samsung Thunders
- 2022: Libertadores de Querétaro
- 2023: TNT Tropang Giga
- 2023: Al Riyadi Club Beirut
- 2023: Gladiadores de Anzoátegui
- 2023: Hsinchu Lioneers
- 2024: Bishrelt Metal
- 2024: Al-Jaish
- 2026: Blackwater Bossing

Career highlights
- NCAA champion (2016); Big East co-Most Improved Player (2014)
- Stats at NBA.com
- Stats at Basketball Reference
Medals
Men's basketball
Representing Nigeria
AfroBasket
Silver medal – second place	2017 Tunisia/Senegal

Daniel Hassan Ochefu (born December 15, 1993) is an American-born Nigerian professional basketball player who last played for the Blackwater Bossing of the Philippine Basketball Association (PBA). He played college basketball for the Villanova Wildcats, and had a short, 19-game stint in the NBA with the Washington Wizards.

== High school career ==
Born in Baltimore, Maryland, Ochefu attended the Westtown School, where he averaged 16 points and 12 rebounds per game as a junior. As a senior, he transferred to Downingtown East High School. He was ranked 54th on ESNPU's list of the top 100 players in his high school class.

== College career ==
Ochefu played college basketball for Villanova. As a freshman, he played behind center Mouphtaou Yarou. In 2013–14, he averaged 5.7 points per game as a reserve player. The following season, he had 9.2 points per game.

Ochefu scored a career-high 25 points in a 73–63 win over St. John's on February 13, 2016. At the conclusion of the regular season, he was named Honorable Mention All-Big East. Ochefu played in the NCAA championship game on April 4, 2016, against North Carolina, where he helped the Wildcats defeat the Tar Heels 77–74, and claim Villanova's second national championship.

== Professional career ==
=== Washington Wizards (2016–2017) ===
After going undrafted in the 2016 NBA draft, Ochefu joined the Washington Wizards for the Las Vegas Summer League, where he averaged 1.8 points and 2.8 rebounds per game. On September 23, 2016, he signed with the Wizards. He made his debut for the Wizards in their season opener on October 27, recording one rebound in four minutes off the bench in a 114–99 loss to the Atlanta Hawks.

=== Maine Red Claws (2017) ===
On October 9, 2017, Ochefu was waived by the Wizards. The Boston Celtics signed him on October 13, 2017. He was assigned to G-League affiliate team the Maine Red Claws.

=== Windy City Bulls (2017–2018) ===
On November 30, 2017, Ochefu was acquired by the Windy City Bulls.

=== Reno Bighorns / Stockton Kings (2018–2019) ===
On February 12, 2018, Ochefu was traded by the Bulls to the Reno Bighorns along with a 2018 third-round draft pick and the returning player rights to Spencer Dinwiddie in exchange for Will Davis, the returning player rights to Lamar Patterson, and a 2018 first-round draft pick. He remained on the team as it became the Stockton Kings. Ochefu averaged 14 points and 8 rebounds per game.

=== Overseas (2019–present) ===
On April 2, 2019, Cafés Candelas Breogán of the Liga ACB announced the signing of Ochefu.

In July 2019, Ochefu signed with the Ibaraki Robots in Japan.

In August 2022, he signed with the Rain or Shine Elasto Painters of the Philippine Basketball Association (PBA) as the team's import for the 2022–23 PBA Commissioner's Cup. However, he was replaced by Steve Taylor prior to the start of the tournament.

In February 2023, Ochefu signed with the TNT Tropang Giga as the team's import for the 2023 EASL Champions Week held in Japan.

On September 20, 2023, Ochefu signed with the Hsinchu Lioneers of the P. League+. On December 1, Ochefu left the team.

In April 2024, Ochefu joined the Al-Jaish of the Syrian Basketball League. In first game of the quarterfinals, Ochefu scored 15 points, 12 rebounds, 3 assists, 1 block.

On February 15, 2026, it was announced that Ochefu has signed with the Blackwater Bossing of the Philippine Basketball Association (PBA). On March 21, 2026, he was replaced by Robert Upshaw.

== International career ==
He was called up for the Nigeria national basketball team for the 2017 FIBA Africa Championship.

== NBA career statistics ==
Legend
GP	Games played	GS	Games started	MPG	Minutes per game
FG%	Field goal percentage	3P%	3-point field goal percentage	FT%	Free throw percentage
RPG	Rebounds per game	APG	Assists per game	SPG	Steals per game
BPG	Blocks per game	PPG	Points per game	**Bold**	Career high

=== Regular season ===
Year	Team	GP	GS	MPG	FG%	3P%	FT%	RPG	APG	SPG	BPG	PPG
2016–17	Washington	19	0	3.9	.444	.000	.000	1.2	.2	.1	.0	1.3
Career		19	0	3.9	.444	.000	.000	1.2	.2	.1	.0	1.3

=== Playoffs ===
Year	Team	GP	GS	MPG	FG%	3P%	FT%	RPG	APG	SPG	BPG	PPG
2017	Washington	4	0	1.3	.000	.000	.000	.3	.0	.0	.0	.0
Career		4	0	1.3	.000	.000	.000	.3	.0	.0	.0	.0
