= Jessie Govan =

American basketball player

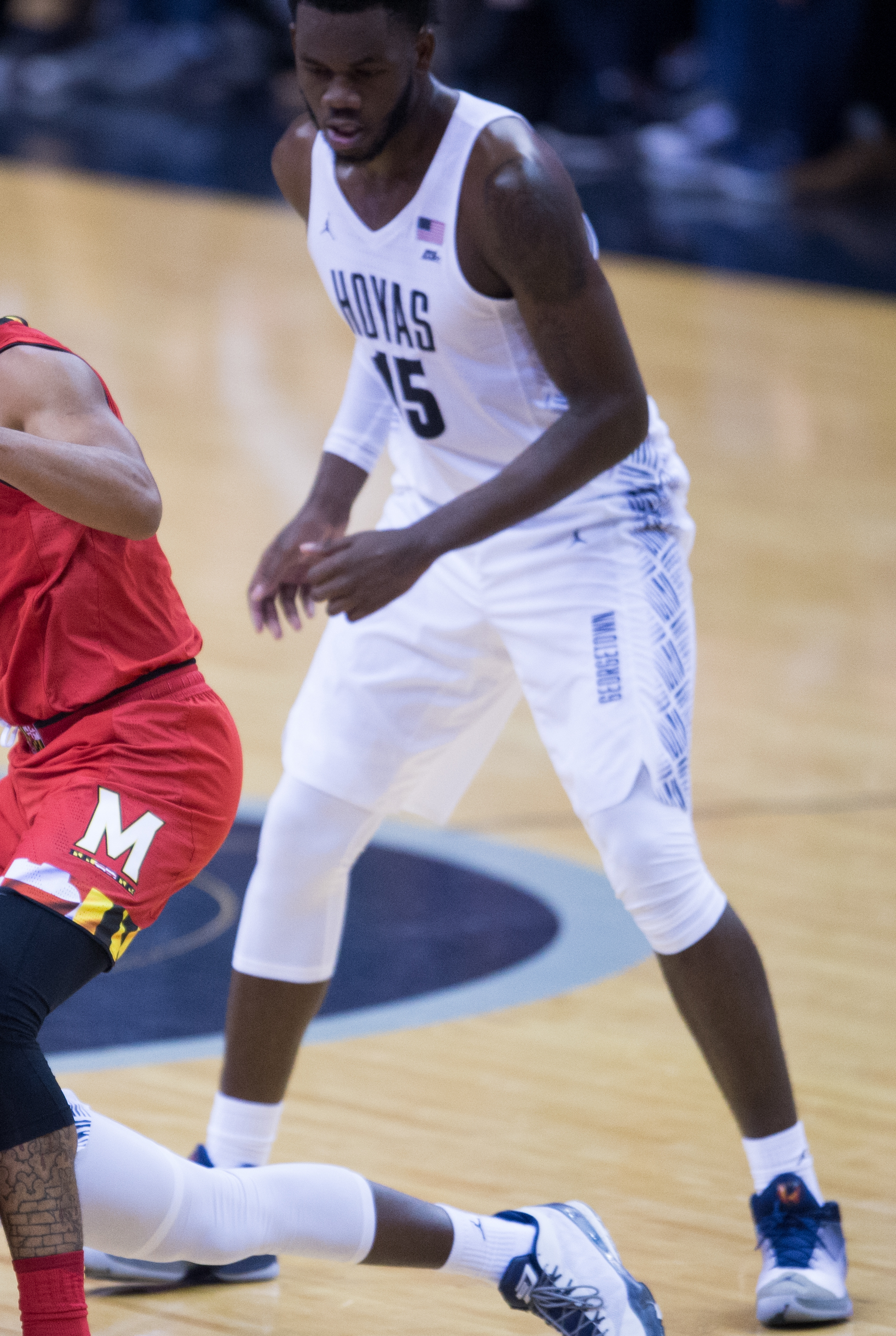

Free agent
- Position: Center

Personal information
- Born: July 25, 1997 (age 29) New York City, New York, U.S.
- Listed height: 6 ft 10 in (2.08 m)
- Listed weight: 252 lb (114 kg)

Career information
- High school: St. Mary's (Manhasset, New York); Wings Academy (Bronx, New York)
- College: Georgetown (2015–2019)
- NBA draft: 2019: undrafted
- Playing career: 2019–present

Career history
- 2019: San-en NeoPhoenix
- 2019–2020: Kyoto Hannaryz
- 2020: Seoul Samsung Thunders
- 2021: NBA G League Ignite
- 2021: Indios de Mayagüez
- 2021–2022: NBA G League Ignite
- 2023: San Miguel Beermen
- 2023: Freseros de Irapuato
- 2024: Ostioneros de Guaymas

Career highlights
- First-team All-Big East (2019)

Jessie J. Govan (born July 25, 1997) is an American professional basketball player. He also played college basketball for the Georgetown Hoyas.

== High school career ==
Govan attended St. Mary's High School before transferring to Wings Academy, playing under coach Billy Turnage. As a senior, Govan led Wings to the Bronx borough championship and PSAL Championship game. He was a McDonald's All American nominee. Rated 44th in his class by Scout.com, Govan signed with Georgetown over offers from UConn, Stanford, Seton Hall, NC State, Syracuse and Miami (Fla.).

== College career ==
Govan was named to the Big East All-Freshman Team and averaged 6.8 points and 4.1 rebounds per game. As a sophomore, Govan averaged 10.1 points and 5.0 rebounds per game. Govan averaged 17.9 points and 10 rebounds per game as a junior. He declared for the 2018 NBA draft, but ultimately decided to return to Georgetown. On January 11, 2019, Govan scored a career-high 33 points along with 14 rebounds in a 96–90 double overtime win over Providence. Govan was named to the First Team All-Big East in his senior season. As a senior, Govan averaged 17.5 points and 7.5 rebounds per game, shooting 41.2 percent on three-pointers. He participated in the Reese's NABC College All-Star Game and Portsmouth Invitational Tournament. He graduated from Georgetown with a degree in sociology.

== Professional career ==
After going undrafted in the 2019 NBA draft, Govan played for the Toronto Raptors in the NBA Summer League. On August 7, 2019, Govan signed with the San-en NeoPhoenix of the Japanese league. He averaged 18.5 points, 8.7 rebounds and 3.2 assists per game with the NeoPhoenix. After parting ways with the team, Govan signed with Kyoto Hannaryz on December 10. He averaged 17 points and 11 rebounds per game for Kyoto. On July 16, 2020, Govan signed with Seoul Samsung Thunders of the Korean Basketball League.

On February 1, 2021, Govan signed with the NBA G League Ignite. On July 3, 2021, Govan signed with the Indios de Mayagüez of the Puerto Rican Baloncesto Superior Nacional. He averaged 16.3 points, 6.0 rebounds, and 1.3 assists per game. On October 2, 2021, Govan returned to the NBA G League Ignite.

On October 28, 2021, Govan re-signed with the NBA G League Ignite.

On October 25, 2022, he signed with the Meralco Bolts of the Philippine Basketball Association (PBA) to replace Johnny O'Bryant III as the team's import for the 2022–23 PBA Commissioner's Cup. However, he was deemed ineligible to play in the conference as he was measured above the 6'10" height limit.

In January 2023, Govan signed with the San Miguel Beermen as the team's import for the 2023 EASL Champions Week held in Japan.
