= Omari Spellman =

American-Lebanese basketball player (born 1997)

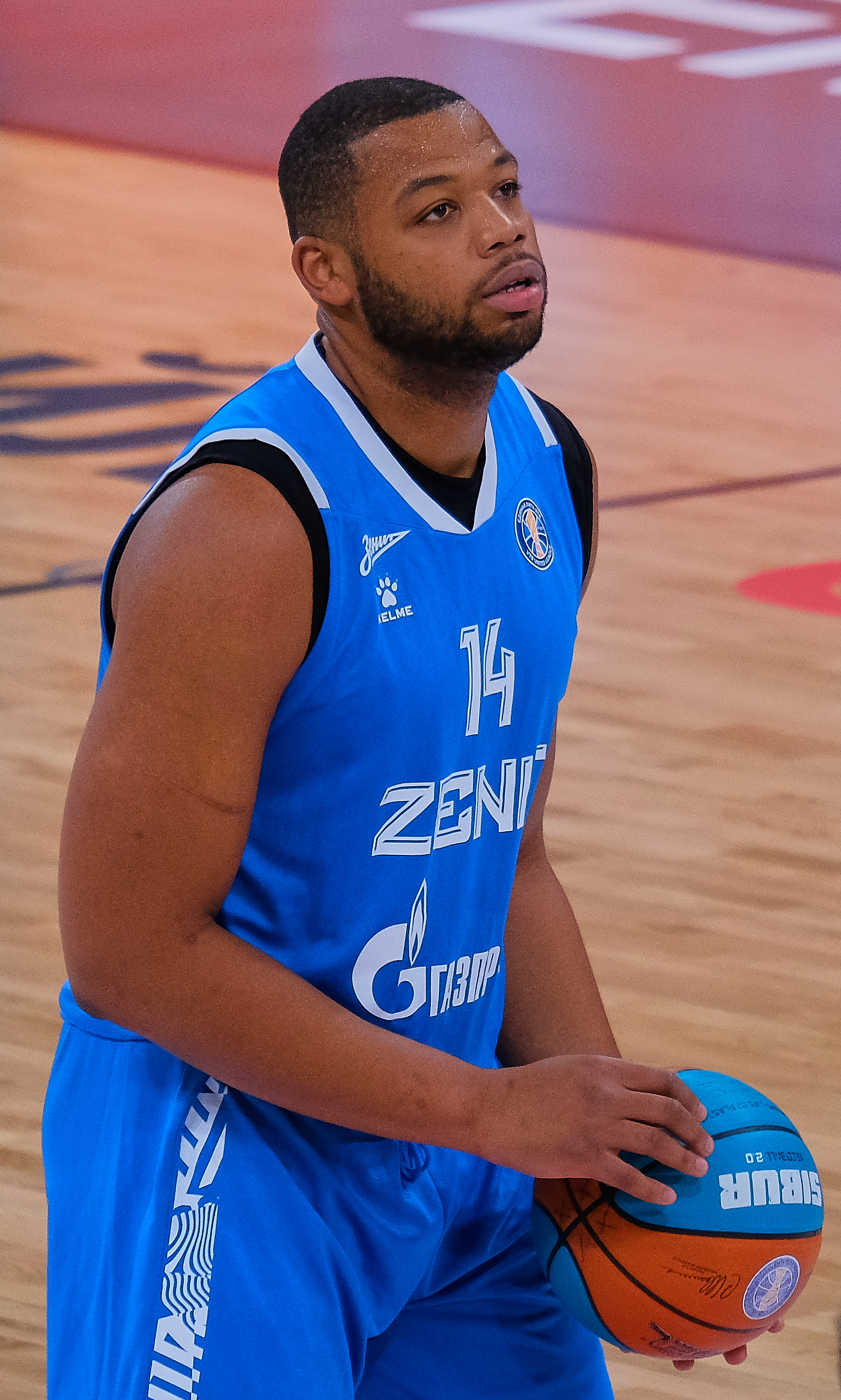
- Spellman with Zenit St. Petersburg in 2024

No. 4 – Ulsan Hyundai Mobis Phoebus
- Position: Power forward
- League: Korean Basketball League

Personal information
- Born: July 21, 1997 (age 29) Cleveland, Ohio, U.S.
- Listed height: 6 ft 9 in (2.06 m)
- Listed weight: 269 lb (122 kg)

Career information
- High school: North Royalton (North Royalton, Ohio); MacDuffie School (Granby, Massachusetts); St. Thomas More School (Montville, Connecticut)
- College: Villanova (2017–2018)
- NBA draft: 2018: 1st round, 30th overall pick
- Drafted by: Atlanta Hawks
- Playing career: 2018–present

Career history
- 2018–2019: Atlanta Hawks
- 2018–2019: →Erie BayHawks
- 2019–2020: Golden State Warriors
- 2020: Iowa Wolves
- 2021: Erie BayHawks
- 2021–2023: Anyang Jung Kwan Jang Red Boosters
- 2024–2025: Zenit St. Petersburg
- 2025: Wonju DB Promy
- 2025–2026: Beijing Ducks
- 2026–present: Ulsan Hyundai Mobis Phoebus

Career highlights
- EASL Champions Week champion (2023); EASL Champions Week MVP (2023); KBL champion (2023); NCAA champion (2018); Big East Rookie of the Year (2018)
- Stats at NBA.com
- Stats at Basketball Reference

Omari Rasulala Spellman (born July 21, 1997) is an American-Lebanese professional basketball player for Ulsan Hyundai Mobis Phoebus of the Korean Basketball League (KBL). He played college basketball for the Villanova Wildcats, winning a national championship in 2018. Spellman was drafted 30th overall by the Atlanta Hawks in the 2018 NBA draft.

== Early life ==
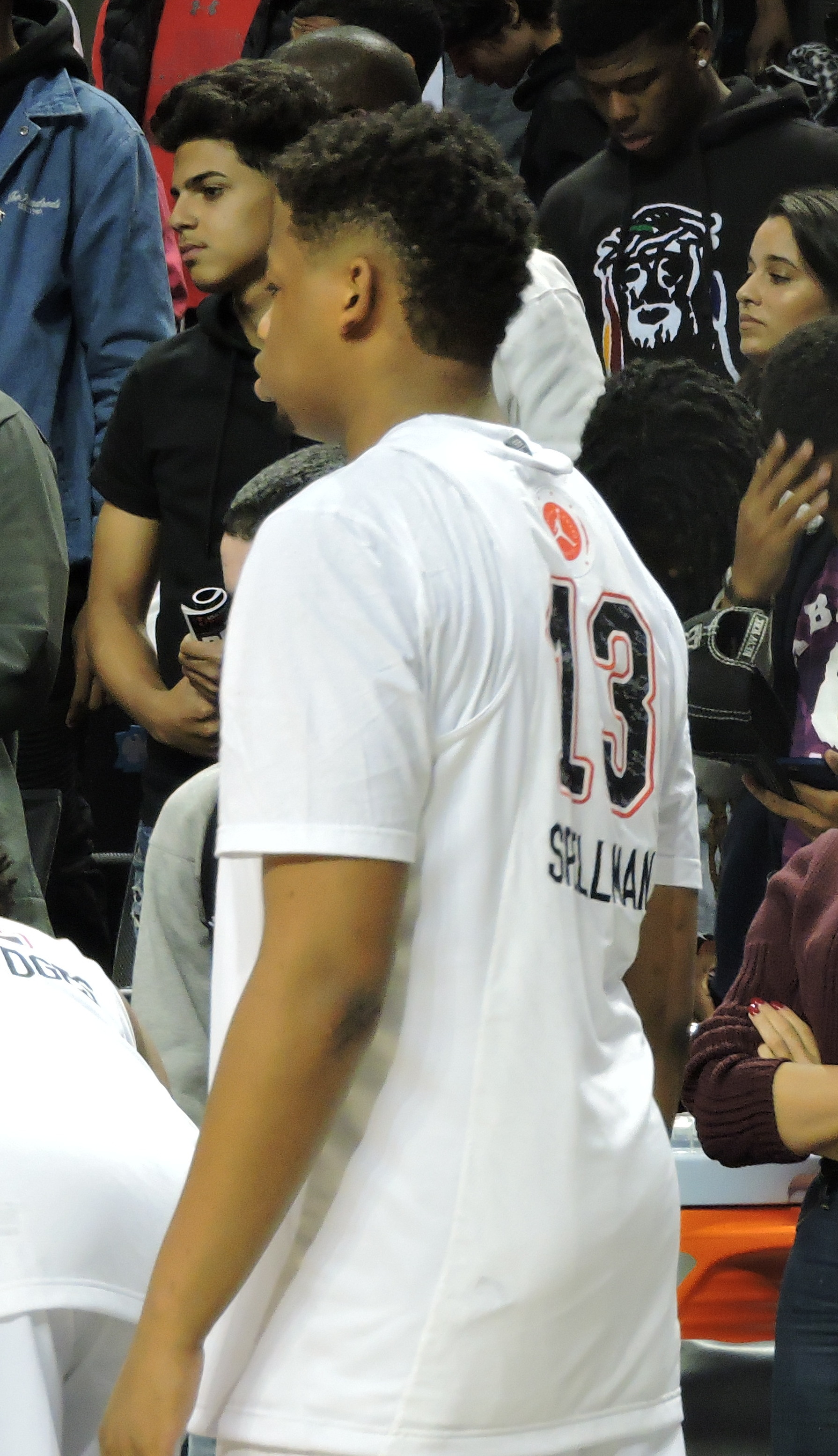
Spellman at the 2016 Jordan Brand Classic

Spellman was born in Cleveland, Ohio. Spellman began 9th grade at Middletown High School in New York but transferred to Hoosac School after two to three months, but had to start in 8th grade there. Spellman later attended North Royalton High School in North Royalton, Ohio. As a sophomore, he averaged 22 points per game and 9.8 rebounds a game for the Bears. Before the start of his Junior year, Spellman decided to attend the MacDuffie School in Granby, Massachusetts. Spellman played his senior season at St. Thomas More in Montville, Connecticut. As a senior in 2015–16, he averaged 16 points and seven rebounds per game. Despite not being named a McDonald's All-American, Spellman was selected to play in the 2016 Jordan Brand Classic where He had a double-double of 12 points and 15 rebounds.

Spellman was rated as a five-star recruit and considered a top-15 player of the 2016 high school class. He was ranked the No. 16 overall player in the 2016 ESPN Top 100 and No. 5 among power forwards. He played AAU ball for the PSA Cardinals and wrote poetry as a downtime activity.

== College career ==
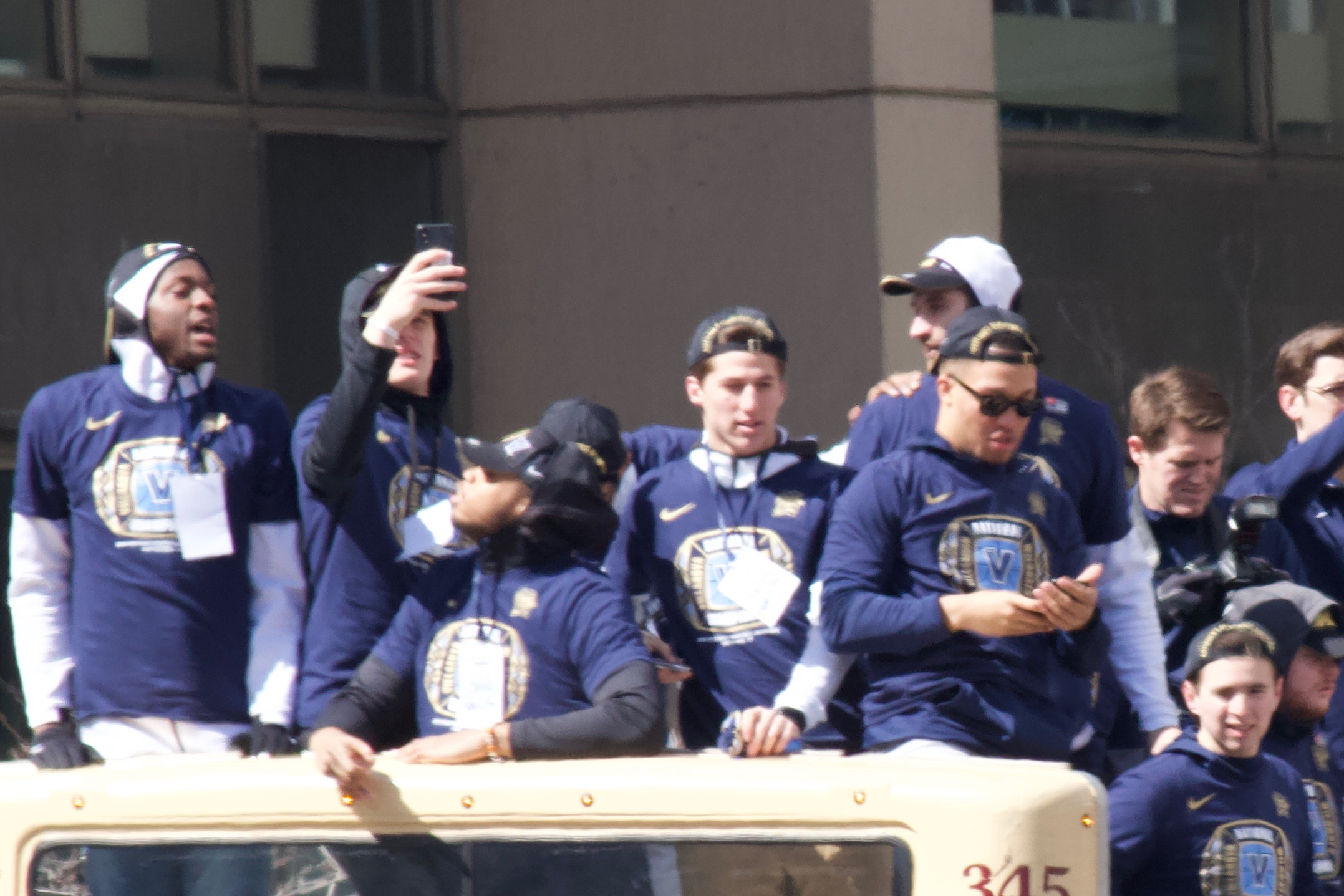
Eric Paschall, Donte DiVincenzo, Spellman, Collin Gillespie, and Jalen Brunson.

Spellman was forced to redshirt his freshman year as a partial academic qualifier since he did not graduate with his original high school class. He broke down in tears when this was first announced but was more composed after the appeal process failed. In his redshirt year, he slimmed down from 300 lbs. to 245 lbs and focused on eating healthier. As a redshirt freshman, Spellman shot a team-high 44.6 percent from behind the arc. Spellman had a season-high 27 points in an 87–67 rout of Temple on December 13. He had 18-points, eight rebounds and three blocks in the Sweet 16 matchup against West Virginia. He earned NCAA All-Region honors for the East region in Boston, alongside teammates Eric Paschall and Jalen Brunson. He averaged 10.9 points, 8.0 rebounds and 1.5 blocks per game on the national champion Villanova team. Following the season Spellman declared for the 2018 NBA draft, and announced he was staying in the draft on May 30.

== Professional career ==
=== Atlanta Hawks (2018–2019) ===
On June 21, 2018, Spellman was selected by the Atlanta Hawks with the 30th overall pick in the 2018 NBA draft. He was the third of four Villanova players drafted that year, as well as the last of their first round selections there. Spellman signed with the Hawks on July 1, 2018.

On December 30, 2018, Spellman was assigned to the Hawks’ NBA G League affiliate, the Erie BayHawks. He made his G League debut the next night, scoring 28 points and collecting 14 rebounds in a loss.

=== Golden State Warriors (2019–2020) ===
On July 8, 2019, Spellman was traded to the Golden State Warriors for Damian Jones and a 2026 second round draft pick.

=== Iowa Wolves (2020) ===
On February 6, 2020, Spellman was traded to the Minnesota Timberwolves, along with D'Angelo Russell and Jacob Evans, in exchange for Andrew Wiggins and a first round pick. After being traded, Spellman was assigned to the Timberwolves' G League affiliate, the Iowa Wolves. He recorded a triple-double with the Wolves on March 8, posting 18 points, 14 rebounds, and 12 assists in a 115–112 loss to the Santa Cruz Warriors. He did not play any games for the Timberwolves.

=== Erie BayHawks (2021) ===
On November 24, 2020, Spellman was traded to the New York Knicks in exchange for Ed Davis. On January 7, 2021, he was waived by the Knicks.

On January 26, 2021, Spellman signed with the Erie BayHawks of the NBA G League.

=== Anyang KGC / Anyang Jung Kwan Jang Red Boosters (2021–2023) ===
Spellman joined the Chicago Bulls for the 2021 NBA Summer League.

On August 31, 2021, Spellman signed with Anyang KGC of the Korean Basketball League. In March 2023, Anyang KGC played in the EASL Champions Week, and won the gold medal. Spellman was named the Champions Week' MVP. In May 2023, he won his first KBL championship. On December 12, his contract was terminated, replacing by Robert Carter.

=== Zenit Saint Petersburg (2024–2025) ===
On July 31, 2024, Spellman signed with Zenit Saint Petersburg of the VTB United League. On January 21, 2025, his contract was terminated.

=== Wonju DB Promy (2025) ===
On February 10, 2025, Spellman signed with Wonju DB Promy of the Korean Basketball League (KBL), replacing Robert Carter.

== National team career ==
On April 18, 2023, Spellman acquired Lebanese citizenship, and joined the Lebanon men's national basketball team.

== Personal life ==
Spellman has a younger brother, Arashma Parks, who currently plays as a forward for Temple University, and a younger sister, Taiyier Parks, who currently plays basketball for Michigan State as a forward.

== Career statistics ==
Legend
GP	Games played	GS	Games started	MPG	Minutes per game
FG%	Field goal percentage	3P%	3-point field goal percentage	FT%	Free throw percentage
RPG	Rebounds per game	APG	Assists per game	SPG	Steals per game
BPG	Blocks per game	PPG	Points per game	**Bold**	Career high

=== NBA ===
==== Regular season ====
Year	Team	GP	GS	MPG	FG%	3P%	FT%	RPG	APG	SPG	BPG	PPG
2018–19	Atlanta	46	**11**	17.5	.402	.344	.711	4.2	**1.0**	.6	**.5**	5.9
2019–20	Golden State	**49**	3	**18.1**	**.431**	**.391**	**.793**	**4.5**	**1.0**	**.7**	**.5**	**7.6**
Career		95	14	17.8	.417	.366	.766	4.3	1.0	.6	.5	6.8

=== College ===
Year	Team	GP	GS	MPG	FG%	3P%	FT%	RPG	APG	SPG	BPG	PPG
2017–18	Villanova	40	39	28.1	.476	.433	.700	8.0	.8	.7	1.5	10.9
