= Bay Area Dragons =

Basketball team based in Hong Kong

- Leagues: East Asia Super League; Philippine Basketball Association (guest team)
- Founded: 2021
- Dissolved: 2023
- History: Bay Area Chun Yu Phoenixes (Note: Never competed under these names) (2021–2022); Bay Area Dragons (2022–2023); Chun Yu Bay Area Dragons (2023)
- Arena: Southorn Stadium
- Capacity: 1,995
- Location: Hong Kong
- Ownership: East Asia Super League (franchise)

The Bay Area Dragons were a professional basketball team in the East Asia Super League. Based in Hong Kong, the team was meant to represent the Greater China region.

Established in 2021, the team competed in the 2022–23 PBA Commissioner's Cup in the Philippines as a guest team and in the 2023 EASL Champions Week. They were disbanded in September 2023.

== History ==
=== Formation ===
The Dragons were originally formed as the Bay Area Chun Yu Phoenixes, a franchise team for the East Asia Super League, representing Greater China. Hong Kong was made as the home venue of the Phoenixes. Both the Phoenixes and the P. League+ champions of Taiwan were designated by the EASL as Greater China's representatives.

The team was established under the agreement of the Hong Kong Basketball Association and Chun Yu Basketball Club. The Phoenixes are the only franchise team in the EASL, with other participating teams seeded from domestic leagues from Japan, Taiwan, South Korea and the Philippines.

Former Chinese Basketball Association general manager Liu Quansheng was appointed as the team's first general manager.

=== Participation in the PBA ===
They entered the 2022–23 Commissioner's Cup of the Philippine Basketball Association which started in September 2022 as a guest team. The team also changed their name to the "Bay Area Dragons" upon joining the PBA, to avoid confusion with the Phoenix Super LPG Fuel Masters. In May 2022, former NBL coach and incumbent Australia Boomers head coach Brian Goorjian was announced as the team's first head coach.

The Bay Area Dragons reached the 2022–23 PBA Commissioner's Cup Finals, becoming the fourth guest team to reach the last stage of a PBA competition. They could only field one of their two foreign players or import at a time in selected games. However, they would lose to the Barangay Ginebra San Miguel, 4–3.

=== EASL Champions Week ===
The Dragons took part in the 2023 EASL Champions Week tournament where they finished third.

=== Planned PBA return and 2023–24 EASL participation ===
They were set to return in the Commissioner's Cup of the 2023–24 PBA season. However, they would be allowed to field one import for the whole conference. They underwent a rebrand and renamed themselves as the Chun Yu Bay Area Dragons. They were set to return to Hong Kong with their PBA games planned to be held there. The team which were also set to take part in the 2023–24 EASL season would sign five new players and retain eight players.

=== Disbandment ===
The Dragons' participation in the PBA and EASL was effectively cancelled after the EASL announced the Dragons's disbandment on 1 September 2023 reportedly due to financial reasons. The EASL mentions "conflict of interest" for managing a team and organizing the league at the same time as the official reason for dissolving the club.

== Home venue ==
The Southorn Stadium, an indoor arena in Wan Chai, Hong Kong was the designated home venue of the Dragons. However they never played any competitive EASL or PBA games in the venue since the team got disbanded.

== Season-by-season records ==
| Season | League | Finish | Wins | Losses | Win% | Playoffs |
|---|---|---|---|---|---|---|
| 2022–23 | PBA (Commissioner's) | 2nd | 17 | 7 | .588 | Won Quarterfinals (Rain or Shine) 1–0; Won Semifinals (San Miguel) 3–1; Lost Finals (Barangay Ginebra) 3–4 |
| 2022–23 | EASL | 3rd | 2 | 1 | .667 | Won Third place game (Ryukyu) 90–70 |
| 2023–24 | PBA (Commissioner's) | Withdrew | | | | |
| 2023–24 | EASL | Withdrew | | | | |

== List of notable personnel ==
=== Players ===
- (Canada) Andrew Nicholson
- (China) Liu Chuanxing
- (China) Liu Xiaoyu
- (Hong Kong) (Canada) Duncan Reid
- (Philippines) (United States) Sedrick Barefield
- (United States) Myles Powell

=== Coaches ===
- (Australia) Brian Goorjian (Head coach)
- (Philippines) Pocholo Villanueva (Assistant coach)

== 2022–23 season roster ==
2022–23 Bay Area Dragons roster
Players
Coaches

| Pos. | No. | Nat. | Name | Ht. | Wt. | Age |
|---|---|---|---|---|---|---|
| G | 0 | (United States) | Scotty Ewing | 5 ft 9 in (1.75 m) | 161 lb (73 kg) | 1991–04–10 |
| G | 1 | (Hong Kong) | Glen Yang | 6 ft 4 in (1.93 m) | 190 lb (86 kg) | 1996–08–30 |
| G | 2 | (Philippines) | Sedrick Barefield | 6 ft 2 in (1.88 m) | 190 lb (86 kg) | 1996–11–18 |
| F | 6 | (China) | Si Kun | 6 ft 6 in (1.98 m) | 203 lb (92 kg) | 1995–02–27 |
| F | 8 | (China) | Zhu Songwei | 6 ft 9 in (2.06 m) | 226 lb (103 kg) | 1996–11–09 |
| F | 9 | (China) | Ju Mingxin | 6 ft 6 in (1.98 m) | 205 lb (93 kg) | 1993–03–10 |
| F | 11 | (Australia) | Hayden Blankley | 6 ft 5 in (1.96 m) | 212 lb (96 kg) | 2000–07–04 |
| G | 13 | (United States) | Myles Powell (I) | 6 ft 2 in (1.88 m) | 195 lb (88 kg) | 1997–07–07 |
| G/F | 15 | (Canada) | Warren Liang | 6 ft 5 in (1.96 m) | 198 lb (90 kg) | 1993–09–19 |
| F | 16 | (China) | Song Jianhua | 6 ft 5 in (1.96 m) | 204 lb (93 kg) | 1991–01–20 |
| C | 21 | (China) | Liu Chuanxing | 7 ft 5 in (2.26 m) | 287 lb (130 kg) | 1999–07–30 |
| G/F | 22 | (Canada) | Kobey Lam | 6 ft 3 in (1.91 m) | 170 lb (77 kg) | 2000–03–02 |
| F | 25 | (China) | Zheng Qilong | 6 ft 8 in (2.03 m) | 198 lb (90 kg) | 1996–04–10 |
| C | 31 | (China) | Zhang Zhiyuan | 6 ft 10 in (2.08 m) | 220 lb (100 kg) | 1999–05–08 |
| F/C | 33 | (Hong Kong) | Duncan Reid | 6 ft 9 in (2.06 m) | 220 lb (100 kg) | 1989–09–28 |
| F/C | 44 | (Canada) | Andrew Nicholson (I) | 6 ft 10 in (2.08 m) | 250 lb (113 kg) | 1989–12–08 |

Head coach

- (Australia) Brian Goorjian

Assistant coach(es)

- (Philippines) Pocholo Villanueva
- (United States) Bill Tomlinson

Team manager

- (Philippines) Maya Montecillo

Legend

- (C) Team captain
- (CI) Commissioner's Cup Import
- (GI) Governors' Cup Import
- (EI) EASL Import
- (DP) Unsigned draft pick
- (FA) Free agent
- (IN) Inactive
- (S) Suspended
- (R) Rookie
- Injured

== Honours ==
Philippine Basketball Association (PBA):

Runners-up (1): 2022–23 Commissioner's Cup
