= Robert Carter (basketball) =

American basketball player (born 1994)

Robert Carter Jr.
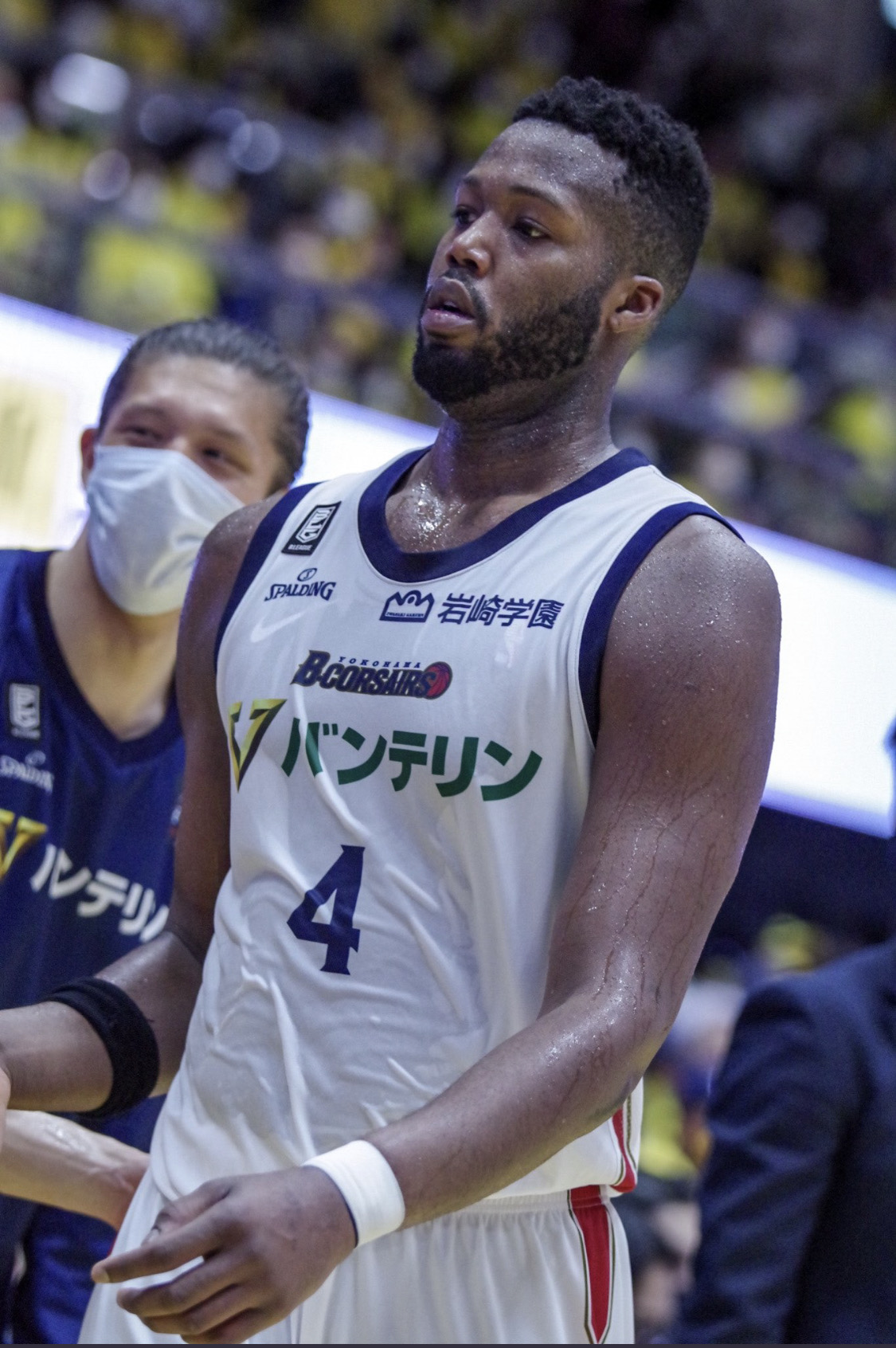
- Carter playing for Yokohama

Free agent
- Position: Power forward

Personal information
- Born: April 4, 1994 (age 32) Thomasville, Georgia, U.S.
- Listed height: 6 ft 9 in (2.06 m)
- Listed weight: 251 lb (114 kg)

Career information
- High school: Thomasville (Thomasville, Georgia); Shiloh (Snellville, Georgia)
- College: Georgia Tech (2012–2014); Maryland (2015–2016)
- NBA draft: 2016: undrafted
- Playing career: 2016–present

Career history
- 2016–2017: Enel Brindisi
- 2017: Lietuvos rytas
- 2017–2018: Gaziantep Basketbol
- 2018–2019: Afyon Belediye
- 2019–2020: Shimane Susanoo Magic
- 2020–2021: Yokohama B-Corsairs
- 2021–2022: San-en NeoPhoenix
- 2022–2023: Bnei Herzliya
- 2023–2024: Anyang Jung Kwan Jang Red Boosters
- 2024–2025: Wonju DB Promy

Robert Lawrence Carter Jr. (born April 4, 1994) is an American professional basketball player who last played for the Wonju DB Promy of the Korean Basketball League (KBL). Born in Thomasville, Georgia, he played basketball for the high school of his hometown as well as Shiloh High School in Snellville, Georgia. Carter played collegiately for Georgia Tech and Maryland.

== College career ==
In June 2014, after two seasons with the Yellow Jackets, Carter Jr. transferred to Maryland. As a red-shirt junior, he was all-Big Ten honorable mention by both the coaches and media. He posted 12.3 points and 6.9 rebounds per game and shot 55 percent from the field and 33 percent from behind the arc. After ensuring his graduation from college, Carter declared for the 2016 NBA draft and signed an agent, losing his final year of college eligibility.

== Professional career ==
Carter went undrafted in the 2016 NBA draft. Carter played for the 2016 Golden State Warriors' Summer League team. On July 30, 2016, Carter signed with Enel Brindisi of Italy's Serie A. He averaged 13 points and 6.6 rebounds per game while shooting 52.5 percent from the floor and 35.5 percent on 3-pointers. This earned him another Summer League invite, this time with the Denver Nuggets.

Before the 2017–18 season, Carter joined the Lithuanian club Lietuvos rytas Vilnius. The player left the club by mutual consent on December 5, 2017. Turkish Super League side Gaziantep Basketbol announced that the American signed for them on the same day. Carter opted out of a deal with Gaziantep to sign with the Zhejiang Golden Bulls of the Chinese Basketball Association on August 13, 2018. However, he never played for Zhejiang.

On December 23, 2018, Carter signed with Afyon Belediye of the Basketbol Süper Ligi.

Carter spent the 2019–20 season with the Shimane Susanoo Magic, in Japan, averaging 21 points and 10 rebounds per game. On September 19, 2020, he signed with the Yokohama B-Corsairs.

On June 20, 2021, Carter signed with San-en NeoPhoenix of the B.League.

On August 10, 2022, Carter signed with Bnei Herzliya of the Israeli Basketball Premier League.

On December 21, 2023, Carter joined Anyang Jung Kwan Jang Red Boosters of the Korean Basketball League, replacing Omari Spellman.

On July 10, 2024, Carter signed with Wonju DB Promy of the Korean Basketball League. On February 10, 2025, he was replaced by Omari Spellman. On February 25, he signed with the Wonju DB Promy, replacing Chinanu Onuaku temporarily.
