= 2022–23 PBA Commissioner's Cup =

Second conference of the 2022–23 PBA season

- Duration: September 21, 2022 – January 15, 2023
- TV partner(s): Local: One Sports; TV5; PBA Rush (HD); International: AksyonTV International iWantTFC (Note: Live on iWantTFC worldwide excluding Philippines and United States)

Finals
- Champions: Barangay Ginebra San Miguel
- Runners-up: Bay Area Dragons

Awards
- Best Player: Scottie Thompson (Barangay Ginebra San Miguel)
- Best Import: Justin Brownlee (Barangay Ginebra San Miguel)
- Finals MVP: Christian Standhardinger (Barangay Ginebra San Miguel)

PBA Commissioner's Cup chronology
- < 2019 2023–24 >

PBA conference chronology
- < 2022 Philippine 2023 Governors' >

The 2022–23 PBA Commissioner's Cup, also known as the 2022–23 Honda PBA Commissioner's Cup for sponsorship reasons, was the second conference of the 2022–23 PBA season of the Philippine Basketball Association (PBA). The 20th edition of the Commissioner's Cup started on September 21, 2022, and ended on January 15, 2023. The tournament allowed teams to hire foreign players or imports with a height limit of 6'10" (2.08 m).

Several games were postponed due to the onslaught of two tropical cyclones Typhoon Karding (Noru) and Tropical Storm Paeng (Nalgae) that both affected the country.

== Format ==
The following format will be observed for the duration of the conference:

- Single-round robin eliminations; 12 games per team; Teams are then seeded by basis on win–loss records.
- Top eight teams will advance to the quarterfinals. In case of tie, a playoff game will be held only for the #8 seed.
- Quarterfinals:
  - QF1: #1 vs #8 (#1 twice-to-beat)
  - QF2: #2 vs #7 (#2 twice-to-beat)
  - QF3: #3 vs #6 (best-of-3 series)
  - QF4: #4 vs #5 (best-of-3 series)
- Semifinals (best-of-5 series):
  - SF1: QF1 winner vs. QF4 winner
  - SF2: QF2 winner vs. QF3 winner
- Finals (best-of-7 series)
  - F1: SF1 winner vs SF2 winner

== Elimination round ==
=== Team standings ===
Pos	Team	W	L	PCT	GB	Qualification
1	Bay Area Dragons (G)	10	2	.833 (Note: Head-to-head record: Bay Area 1–0 Magnolia)	—	Twice-to-beat in the quarterfinals
2	Magnolia Chicken Timplados Hotshots	10	2	.833	—	Twice-to-beat in the quarterfinals
3	Barangay Ginebra San Miguel	9	3	.750	1	Best-of-three quarterfinals
4	Converge FiberXers	8	4	.667	2	Best-of-three quarterfinals
5	San Miguel Beermen	7	5	.583	3	Best-of-three quarterfinals
6	NorthPort Batang Pier	6	6	.500 (Note: Head-to-head record: NorthPort 1–0 Phoenix)	4	Best-of-three quarterfinals
7	Phoenix Super LPG Fuel Masters	6	6	.500	4	Twice-to-win in the quarterfinals
8	Rain or Shine Elasto Painters	5	7	.417 (Note: Eighth seed playoff: Rain or Shine 110–100 NLEX)	5	Twice-to-win in the quarterfinals
9	NLEX Road Warriors	5	7	.417	5	
10	Meralco Bolts	4	8	.333 (Note: Head-to-head record: Meralco 1–0 TNT)	6	
11	TNT Tropang Giga	4	8	.333	6	
12	Blackwater Bossing	3	9	.250	7	
13	Terrafirma Dyip	1	11	.083	9	

Source: PBA.ph
Rules for classification: 1) winning percentage; 2) if two teams are tied, head-to-head record; if three or more teams are tied, head-to-head goal average (quotient); if tied for 8th, one-game playoff; 3) overall quotient; 4) coin toss
(G) Guests

=== Schedule ===
Team ╲ Game	1	2	3	4	5	6	7	8	9	10	11	12
Barangay Ginebra	ROS	MER	BAY	PHX	MAG	TER	SMB	BWB	TNT	NLEX	NP	CON
Bay Area	BWB	NP	PHX	CON	BGSM	SMB	TER	MER	ROS	NLEX	MAG	TNT
Blackwater	BAY	PHX	NLEX	SMB	NP	TER	TNT	CON	MAG	MER	BGSM	ROS
Converge	TER	MAG	BAY	MER	SMB	TNT	BWB	NLEX	PHX	ROS	NP	BGSM
Magnolia	TER	CON	TNT	NLEX	NP	BGSM	BWB	PHX	SMB	BAY	MER	ROS
Meralco	NP	BGSM	TER	CON	PHX	ROS	BAY	BWB	TNT	MAG	NLEX	SMB
NLEX	ROS	BWB	PHX	MAG	TNT	SMB	CON	NP	BAY	TER	BGSM	MER
NorthPort	PHX	BAY	MER	TNT	BWB	MAG	SMB	ROS	NLEX	TER	CON	BGSM
Phoenix Super LPG	NP	BWB	BAY	NLEX	BGSM	MER	ROS	TNT	CON	MAG	SMB	TER
Rain or Shine	NLEX	BGSM	TER	SMB	TNT	MER	PHX	NP	BAY	CON	BWB	MAG
San Miguel	BWB	ROS	BAY	CON	NLEX	NP	BGSM	MAG	PHX	TER	TNT	MER
Terrafirma	CON	MAG	ROS	MER	BWB	BAY	BGSM	TNT	NP	NLEX	SMB	PHX
TNT	MAG	NP	ROS	NLEX	BWB	CON	PHX	TER	MER	BGSM	BAY	SMB

Source: PBA.ph
= Win; = OT win; = Loss; = OT loss

=== Results ===
Teams	BGSM	BAY	BWB	CON	MAG	MER	NLEX	NP	PHX	ROS	SMB	TER	TNT
Barangay Ginebra	—	111–93	98–84	115–96	103–97	99–91	117–120*	122–105	93–101	71–93	97–96	111–90	89–85
Bay Area		—	133–87	106–100	95–89	89–92	118–98	105–104	101–91	120–87	113–87	130–76	140–108
Blackwater			—	71–77	69–91	98–102*	102–105	83–87	97–85	97–116	109–106	93–86	98–108
Converge				—	105–109	106–99	108–84	97–112	132–127	102–101	106–102	124–110	130–117
Magnolia					—	108–96	111–97	109–91	90–80	106–90	85–80	100–92	94–92
Meralco						—	81–92	95–101*	82–89	96–113	108–113	105–92	97–91
NLEX							—	94–107	97–111	96–90	116–124	114–124*	110–101
NorthPort								—	92–89	75–76	86–104	91–85	93–117
Phoenix Super LPG									—	92–83	104–108	135–84	91–88
Rain or Shine										—	105–113	106–94	91–110
San Miguel											—	131–103	119–99
Terrafirma												—	90–121
TNT													—

Source: PBA.ph results, PBA.ph schedule
Legend: Blue = left column team win; Red = top row team win.
Matches with lighter background shading were decided after overtime.

== Eighth seed playoff ==
TV5

December 4, 2022
6:30 pm

Box score

NLEX Road Warriors 100, Rain or Shine Elasto Painters 110
Scoring by quarter: 27–31, 16–20, 32–29, 25–30
Pts: Clark 37; Rebs: Clark 16; Asts: Clark 5	Pts: Pearson 24; Rebs: Pearson 9 Asts: four players 3

PhilSports Arena, Pasig
Referees: Nol Quilingen, Mike Flordeliza, Jerry Narandan, Tom Mendoza

== Bracket ==
Quarterfinals
(#1 twice-to-beat)
1	Bay Area	126
8	Rain or Shine	96
(best-of-3)
4	Converge	0
5	San Miguel	2
(#2 twice-to-beat)
2	Magnolia	102
7	Phoenix Super LPG	95
(best-of-3)
3	Barangay Ginebra	2
6	NorthPort	0

Semifinals (Best-of-5)
1	Bay Area	3
5	San Miguel	1
2	Magnolia	1
3	Barangay Ginebra	3

Finals (Best-of-7)
1	Bay Area	3
3	Barangay Ginebra	4

== Quarterfinals ==
=== (1) Bay Area vs. (8) Rain or Shine ===
Bay Area has the twice-to-beat advantage; they have to be beaten twice, while their opponents just once, to advance.

TV5

December 9, 2022
3:00 pm

Box score

Bay Area Dragons 126, Rain or Shine Elasto Painters 96
Scoring by quarter: 27–16, 33–28, 32–24, 34–28
Pts: Blankley 47; Rebs: Blankley 10; Asts: Yang 10	Pts: Nambatac 19; Rebs: three players 5 Asts: Caracut 11
Bay Area wins series in one game

PhilSports Arena, Pasig
Referees: Nol Quilinguen, Mike Flordeliza, Albert Nubla, Gomer Obina

=== (2) Magnolia vs. (7) Phoenix Super LPG ===
Magnolia has the twice-to-beat advantage; they have to be beaten twice, while their opponents just once, to advance.

TV5

December 9, 2022
5:45 pm

Box score

Magnolia Chicken Timplados Hotshots 102, Phoenix Super LPG Fuel Masters 95
Scoring by quarter: 28–26, 22–20, 26–28, 26–21
Pts: Abueva 19; Rebs: Rakocevic 13; Asts: Barroca 5	Pts: Tio 18; Rebs: Wesson 12; Asts: Wesson 9
Magnolia wins series in one game

PhilSports Arena, Pasig
Referees: Sherwin Pineda, Bing Oliva, J., Tom Mendoza

=== (3) Barangay Ginebra vs. (6) NorthPort ===
This is a best-of-three playoff.

TV5

December 7, 2022
5:45 pm

Box score

Barangay Ginebra San Miguel 118, NorthPort Batang Pier 102
Scoring by quarter: 29–24, 27–26, 33–24, 29–28
Pts: Brownlee 39; Rebs: Malonzo 9 Asts: Brownlee 7	Pts: Tolentino 29; Rebs: Ibeh 15; Asts: Bolick 6

PhilSports Arena, Pasig
Referees: Rommel Gruta, Bing Oliva, Janine Nicandro, Bryan Peclaro

One Sports

December 10, 2022
4:30 pm

Box score

Barangay Ginebra San Miguel 99, NorthPort Batang Pier 93
Scoring by quarter: 13–29, 30–18, 29–19, 27–27
Pts: Brownlee 20; Rebs: Brownlee, Thompson 9 Asts: Thompson 9	Pts: Chan 20; Rebs: Ibeh 12; Asts: Chan 6
Barangay Ginebra wins series, 2–0

PhilSports Arena, Pasig
Referees: Jimmy Mariano, Jerry Narandan, Joel Baldago, Niño Barcenas

=== (4) Converge vs. (5) San Miguel ===
This is a best-of-three playoff.

TV5

December 7, 2022
3:00 pm

Box score

Converge FiberXers 96, San Miguel Beermen 114
Scoring by quarter: 13–21, 19–34, 33–33, 31–26
Pts: Miller 41; Rebs: Miller 13; Asts: Ilagan, Melecio 4	Pts: Perez 25; Rebs: Fajardo 16; Asts: Enciso 10

PhilSports Arena, Pasig
Referees: Jimmy Mariano, Joel Baldago, Jeff Tantay, Niño Barcenas

One Sports

December 10, 2022
6:45 pm

Box score

Converge FiberXers 107, San Miguel Beermen 120
Scoring by quarter: 15–27, 29–34, 30–36, 33–23
Pts: Teng 25; Rebs: Teng 10; Asts: Stockton 5	Pts: Romeo 22; Rebs: Fajardo 18; Asts: Enciso, Fajardo 7
San Miguel wins series, 2–0

PhilSports Arena, Pasig
Referees: Rommel Gruta, Mike Flordeliza, Albert Nubla, Bryan Peclaro

== Semifinals ==
All match-ups are best-of-five playoffs.

=== (1) Bay Area vs. (5) San Miguel ===
TV5

December 14, 2022
3:00 pm

Box score

Bay Area Dragons 103, San Miguel Beermen 102
Scoring by quarter: 23–31, 28–28, 27–30, 25–13
Pts: Nicholson 30; Rebs: Nicholson 15; Asts: Zhu 7	Pts: Perez 24; Rebs: Fajardo, Scott 8 Asts: Scott 8

PhilSports Arena, Pasig
Referees: Rommel Gruta, Bing Oliva, Niño Barcenas, Joel Baldago

TV5

December 16, 2022
5:45 pm

Box score

Bay Area Dragons 114, San Miguel Beermen 95
Scoring by quarter: 26–25, 26–17, 28–24, 34–29
Pts: Nicholson 34; Rebs: Nicholson 16; Asts: Yang 8	Pts: Fajardo 35; Rebs: Fajardo 10; Asts: Scott 6

PhilSports Arena, Pasig
Referees: Nol Quilinguen, Jerry Narandan, Mao Orioste, Bryan Peclaro

TV5

December 18, 2022
4:30 pm

Box score

Bay Area Dragons 96, San Miguel Beermen 98
Scoring by quarter: 24–17, 23–26, 23–32, 26–23
Pts: Nicholson 34; Rebs: Nicholson 14; Asts: Yang 9	Pts: Scott 25; Rebs: Fajardo 16; Asts: Enciso 7

PhilSports Arena, Pasig
Referees: Nol Quilingen, Bing Oliva, Janine Nicandro, Niño Cortez

TV5

December 21, 2022
5:45 pm

Box score

Bay Area Dragons 94, San Miguel Beermen 92
Scoring by quarter: 17–16, 29–22, 23–34, 25–20
Pts: Nicholson 42; Rebs: Nicholson 21; Asts: Yang 6	Pts: Perez 28; Rebs: Scott 19; Asts: Scott 8
Bay Area wins series, 3–1

SM Mall of Asia Arena, Pasay
Referees: Sherwin Pineda, Mike Flordeliza, Albert Nubla, Jeffrey Tantay

=== (2) Magnolia vs. (3) Barangay Ginebra ===
TV5

December 14, 2022
5:45 pm

Box score

Magnolia Chicken Timplados Hotshots 84, Barangay Ginebra San Miguel 87
Scoring by quarter: 22–24, 22–21, 23–25, 17–17
Pts: Lee 21; Rebs: Abueva 12; Asts: Barroca 9	Pts: Malonzo 21; Rebs: Brownlee 13; Asts: three players 6

PhilSports Arena, Pasig
Referees: Nol Quilingen, Jerry Narandan, Mao Orioste, Jeffrey Tantay

TV5

December 16, 2022
3:00 pm

Box score

Magnolia Chicken Timplados Hotshots 96, Barangay Ginebra San Miguel 95
Scoring by quarter: 27–32, 24–18, 22–28, 23–17
Pts: Lee 24; Rebs: Rakocevic 20; Asts: Jalalon 5	Pts: Brownlee 34; Rebs: Thompson 9 Asts: Tenorio 7

PhilSports Arena, Pasig
Referees: Rommel Gruta, Mike Flordeliza, Janine Nicandro, Niño Cortez

TV5

December 18, 2022
6:45 pm

Box score

Magnolia Chicken Timplados Hotshots 80, Barangay Ginebra San Miguel 103
Scoring by quarter: 15–17, 19–32, 27–25, 19–29
Pts: Jalalon 16; Rebs: Rakocevic 12; Asts: Barroca, Jalalon 6	Pts: Brownlee 38; Rebs: Brownlee 9 Asts: Brownlee 7

PhilSports Arena, Pasig
Referees: Rommel Gruta, Mike Flordeliza, Mao Orioste, Albert Nubla

TV5

December 21, 2022
3:00 pm

Box score

Magnolia Chicken Timplados Hotshots 84, Barangay Ginebra San Miguel 99
Scoring by quarter: 18–29, 23–24, 27–29, 16–17
Pts: Abueva 14; Rebs: Rakocevic 13; Asts: Jalalon 9	Pts: Brownlee 24; Rebs: Brownlee 14; Asts: Brownlee, Malonzo 6
Barangay Ginebra wins series, 3–1

SM Mall of Asia Arena, Pasay
Referees: Jimmy Mariano, Jerry Narandan, Mao Orioste, Niño Barcenas

== Finals ==
TV5

December 25, 2022
5:00 pm

Box score

Barangay Ginebra San Miguel 96, Bay Area Dragons 81

SM Mall of Asia Arena, Pasay

TV5

December 28, 2022
5:45 pm

Box score

Barangay Ginebra San Miguel 82, Bay Area Dragons 99

Araneta Coliseum, Quezon City

TV5

January 4, 2023
5:45 pm

Box score

Barangay Ginebra San Miguel 89, Bay Area Dragons 82

SM Mall of Asia Arena, Pasay

TV5

January 6, 2023
5:45 pm

Box score

Barangay Ginebra San Miguel 86, Bay Area Dragons 94

SM Mall of Asia Arena, Pasay

TV5

January 8, 2023
5:45 pm

Box score

Barangay Ginebra San Miguel 101, Bay Area Dragons 91

SM Mall of Asia Arena, Pasay

TV5

January 11, 2023
5:45 pm

Box score

Barangay Ginebra San Miguel 84, Bay Area Dragons 87

Araneta Coliseum, Quezon City

TV5

January 15, 2023
5:45 pm

Box score

Barangay Ginebra San Miguel 114, Bay Area Dragons 99
Barangay Ginebra wins series, 4–3

Philippine Arena, Bocaue, Bulacan

== Imports ==
The following is the list of imports, which had played for their respective teams at least once, with the returning imports in italics. Highlighted are the imports who stayed with their respective teams for the whole conference.

Team	Name	Debuted	Last game	Record
Barangay Ginebra San Miguel	(United States) Justin Brownlee	September 28, 2022 (vs. Rain or Shine)	January 15, 2023 (vs. Bay Area)	18–7
Bay Area Dragons	(United States) Myles Powell (Note: For the Bay Area Dragons guest team, its entire roster is composed of non-Filipinos. For purposes of the import and the height-limit, all Chinese citizens (including Hong Kong nationals) are considered "locals", while non-Chinese are imports, and only one non-Chinese can play at a game. Aside from being guest in the PBA, they are a franchise team of the East Asia Super League (EASL). In the 2022–23 East Asia Super League, a team is allowed to have two non-Asian imports. The Dragons have two non-Asians on their roster, Canadian Andrew Nicholson and the American Myles Powell. The Dragons played each player for four consecutive games each, but chose which one of them to play with on their ninth games onwards. The team chose Powell as the team's final import starting their ninth game, but the team activated Nicholson during the start of the quarterfinals due to Powell's injury. Eventually they chose Nicholson to be their import for the rest of the conference. However, Nicholson sustained an injury during game 3 of the Finals which forced him to miss both games 4 and 5. He was replaced by Powell for the final time during games 6 and 7.)	September 21, 2022 (vs. Blackwater)	January 15, 2023 (vs. Barangay Ginebra)	9–1
Bay Area Dragons	(Canada) Andrew Nicholson	October 9, 2022 (vs. Barangay Ginebra)	January 4, 2023 (vs. Barangay Ginebra)	7–5
Bay Area Dragons	No import	January 6, 2023 (vs. Barangay Ginebra), January 8, 2023 (vs. Barangay Ginebra)		1–1
Blackwater Bossing	(United States) Cameron Krutwig	September 21, 2022 (vs. Bay Area)	November 25, 2022 (vs. Rain or Shine)	3–9
Converge FiberXers	(United States) Quincy Miller	September 23, 2022 (vs. Terrafirma)	December 10, 2022 (vs. San Miguel)	8–5
Converge FiberXers	No import	November 20, 2022 (vs. NorthPort)		0–1
Magnolia Chicken Timplados Hotshots	(Serbia) Nick Rakocevic	September 28, 2022 (vs. Terrafirma)	December 21, 2022 (vs. Barangay Ginebra)	12–5
Meralco Bolts	(United States) Johnny O'Bryant III	September 30, 2022 (vs. NorthPort)	October 22, 2022 (vs. Rain or Shine)	1–5
Meralco Bolts	(United States) K. J. McDaniels	November 4, 2022 (vs. Bay Area)	December 2, 2022 (vs. San Miguel)	3–3
NLEX Road Warriors	(United States) Earl Clark	September 23, 2022 (vs. Rain or Shine)	December 4, 2022 (vs. Rain or Shine)	5–8
NorthPort Batang Pier	(United Kingdom) Prince Ibeh	September 21, 2022 (vs. Phoenix)	December 10, 2022 (vs. Barangay Ginebra)	6–8
Phoenix Super LPG Fuel Masters	(United States) Kaleb Wesson	September 21, 2022 (vs. NorthPort)	December 9, 2022 (vs. Magnolia)	6–7
Rain or Shine Elasto Painters	(United States) Steve Taylor Jr.	September 23, 2022 (vs. NLEX)	November 4, 2022 (vs. NorthPort)	4–3
Rain or Shine Elasto Painters	No import	October 15, 2022 (vs. TNT)		0–1
Rain or Shine Elasto Painters	(United States) Ryan Pearson	November 11, 2022 (vs. Bay Area)	December 9, 2022 (vs. Bay Area)	2–4
San Miguel Beermen	(United States) Diamond Stone	October 5, 2022 (vs. Blackwater)	October 16, 2022 (vs. Bay Area)	1–2
San Miguel Beermen	(United States) Devon Scott	October 21, 2022 (vs. Converge)	December 21, 2022 (vs. Bay Area)	9–6
Terrafirma Dyip	(Indonesia) Lester Prosper	September 23, 2022 (vs. Converge)	November 18, 2022 (vs. NLEX)	1–9
Terrafirma Dyip	No import	November 23, 2022 (vs. San Miguel), November 26, 2022 (vs. Phoenix)		0–2
TNT Tropang Giga	(United States) Cameron Oliver	October 5, 2022 (vs. Magnolia)	November 16, 2022 (vs. Meralco)	4–5
TNT Tropang Giga	No import	November 20, 2022 (vs. Barangay Ginebra)		0–1
TNT Tropang Giga	(United States) Matt Mobley	November 23, 2022 (vs. Bay Area)	November 26, 2022 (vs. San Miguel)	0–2

== Awards ==
=== Players of the Week ===
Week	Player	Ref.
September 21–24, 2022	Arvin Tolentino (NorthPort Batang Pier)	
September 28 – October 2, 2022	Robert Bolick (NorthPort Batang Pier)	
October 5–9, 2022	Tyler Tio (Phoenix Super LPG Fuel Masters)	
October 12–16, 2022	Jio Jalalon (Magnolia Chicken Timplados Hotshots)	
October 19–23, 2022	Scottie Thompson (Barangay Ginebra San Miguel)	
October 26–30, 2022	Encho Serrano (Phoenix Super LPG Fuel Masters)	
November 4–6, 2022	Aljun Melecio (Converge FiberXers)	
November 9–13, 2022	Jeron Teng (Converge FiberXers)	
November 16–20, 2022	William Navarro (NorthPort Batang Pier)	
November 23–27, 2022	Don Trollano (NLEX Road Warriors)	
November 30 – December 4, 2022	Andrei Caracut (Rain or Shine Elasto Painters)	
December 7–10, 2022	LA Tenorio (Barangay Ginebra San Miguel)	
December 14–18, 2022	June Mar Fajardo (San Miguel Beermen)	

== Statistics ==
=== Individual statistical leaders ===
==== Local players ====
Category	Player	Team	Statistic
Points per game	Robert Bolick	NorthPort Batang Pier	21.0
Rebounds per game	June Mar Fajardo	San Miguel Beermen	12.4
Assists per game	Alex Cabagnot	Terrafirma Dyip	6.4
Steals per game	Jio Jalalon	Magnolia Chicken Timplados Hotshots	2.2
Blocks per game	Justin Arana	Converge FiberXers	1.4
Turnovers per game	Zhu Songwei	Bay Area Dragons	3.0
Fouls per game	Beau Belga	Rain or Shine Elasto Painters	3.8
Minutes per game	Robert Bolick	NorthPort Batang Pier	41.4
FG%	Liu Chuanxing	Bay Area Dragons	71.6%
FT%	RK Ilagan	Converge FiberXers	91.7%
3FG%	Marcio Lassiter	San Miguel Beermen	47.4%
Double-doubles	June Mar Fajardo	San Miguel Beermen	6

==== Import players ====
Category	Player	Team	Statistic
Points per game	Myles Powell	Bay Area Dragons	35.6
Rebounds per game	Nick Rakocevic	Magnolia Chicken Timplados Hotshots	17.0
Assists per game	Justin Brownlee	Barangay Ginebra San Miguel	6.8
Steals per game	Quincy Miller	Converge FiberXers	1.9
Blocks per game	Prince Ibeh	NorthPort Batang Pier	4.1
Turnovers per game	Prince Ibeh	NorthPort Batang Pier	4.1
Fouls per game	K. J. McDaniels	Meralco Bolts	3.7
Minutes per game	K. J. McDaniels	Meralco Bolts	43.6
FG%	Prince Ibeh	NorthPort Batang Pier	66.9%
FT%	Justin Brownlee	Barangay Ginebra San Miguel	82.0%
3FG%	Andrew Nicholson	Bay Area Dragons	45.2%
Double-doubles	Justin Brownlee	Barangay Ginebra San Miguel	17
Triple-doubles	Justin Brownlee	Barangay Ginebra San Miguel	3

=== Individual game highs ===
==== Local players ====
Category	Player	Team	Statistic
Points	Hayden Blankley	Bay Area Dragons	47
Rebounds	June Mar Fajardo	San Miguel Beermen	18
Assists	Jio Jalalon	Magnolia Chicken Timplados Hotshots	12
Steals	Jio Jalalon	Magnolia Chicken Timplados Hotshots	6
Steals	Scottie Thompson	Barangay Ginebra San Miguel	6
Blocks	Japeth Aguilar	Barangay Ginebra San Miguel	6
Three point field goals	Hayden Blankley	Bay Area Dragons	10

==== Import players ====
Category	Player	Team	Statistic
Points	three players		50
Rebounds	Nick Rakocevic	Magnolia Chicken Timplados Hotshots	28
Assists	Justin Brownlee (twice)	Barangay Ginebra San Miguel	12
Steals	three players		5
Blocks	Quincy Miller	Converge FiberXers	9
Three point field goals	Myles Powell	Bay Area Dragons	11

=== Team statistical leaders ===
Category	Team	Statistic
Points per game	Bay Area Dragons	111.9
Rebounds per game	Converge FiberXers	50.9
Assists per game	Barangay Ginebra San Miguel	27.0
Steals per game	Phoenix Super LPG Fuel Masters	10.2
Blocks per game	NorthPort Batang Pier	6.3
Turnovers per game	Phoenix Super LPG Fuel Masters	18.2
Fouls per game	Converge FiberXers	25.8
FG%	Bay Area Dragons	48.2%
FT%	Magnolia Chicken Timplados Hotshots	76.6%
3FG%	TNT Tropang Giga	36.3%

== Final rankings ==
Pos	Team	Pld	W	L	Best finish
1	Barangay Ginebra San Miguel (C)	25	18	7	Champion
2	Bay Area Dragons (G)	24	17	7	Runner-up
3	Magnolia Chicken Timplados Hotshots	17	12	5	Semifinalist
4	San Miguel Beermen	18	10	8	Semifinalist
5	Converge FiberXers	14	8	6	Quarterfinalist
6	NorthPort Batang Pier	14	6	8	Quarterfinalist
7	Phoenix Super LPG Fuel Masters	13	6	7	Quarterfinalist
8	Rain or Shine Elasto Painters	14	6	8	Quarterfinalist
9	NLEX Road Warriors	13	5	8	Elimination round
10	Meralco Bolts	12	4	8	Elimination round
11	TNT Tropang Giga	12	4	8	Elimination round
12	Blackwater Bossing	12	3	9	Elimination round
13	Terrafirma Dyip	12	1	11	Elimination round

Rules for classification: 1) finals result, 2) elimination round seed of semifinalists, 3) elimination round seed of quarterfinalists, 4) elimination round finish
(C) Champions; (G) Guests
