= Glen Yang =

Hong Kong basketball player (born 1996)

No. 13 – Hong Kong Bulls
- Position: Point guard / shooting guard
- League: National Basketball League

Personal information
- Born: August 30, 1996 (age 30) Burnaby, Canada
- Listed height: 193 cm (6 ft 4 in)
- Listed weight: 82 kg (181 lb)

Career information
- High school: Sir Winston Churchill (Calgary, Alberta)
- College: Mount Royal (2014–2019)
- Playing career: 2019–present

Career history
- 2019: South China
- 2019–2020: KFC Culleredo
- 2020: Palma
- 2022–2023: Bay Area Dragons
- 2023: Winnipeg Sea Bears
- 2023–2024: Kaohsiung 17Live Steelers
- 2024: Vancouver Bandits
- 2024–2026: Hong Kong Eastern
- 2025: Vancouver Bandits
- 2026: South China
- 2026–present: Hong Kong Bulls

Career highlights
- BCL–East champions (2026); BCL–East MVP (2026)

Glen Yang
- Traditional Chinese: 楊和
Transcriptions
Yue: Cantonese
- Hong Kong Romanisation: Yeung Wo

Glen Robertson Yang is a Canadian-born Hong Konger basketball player.

== Early life and education ==
Yang was born on August 30, 1996, in Burnaby, Canada, to Qiang Yang, a Chinese scientist from Beijing and a white Canadian mother from Calgary, before moving to Hong Kong at five years old. He studied at the Sir Winston Churchill High School before attending the Mount Royal University in 2014.

== Career ==
=== College ===
Having played for the basketball team of Sir Winston Churchill High School, Yang went on to play for the Mount Royal Cougars. He played for the Cougars for five seasons, leading the team to its first U Sports playoffs in the 2018–19 season.

=== Professional ===
==== Early years ====
After graduating from college, Yang joined South China of the Hong Kong A1 Division Championship. He later went to Spain to play for the KFC Culleredo of Liga EBA from 2019 to 2019. He then joined Palma of LEB Silver. Only playing two games for Palma, his stint was disrupted by the COVID-19 pandemic.

==== Bay Area Dragons ====
Yang joined Hong Kong-based team Bay Area Dragons in January 2022. The team played in the Philippine Basketball Association as a guest team. He helped the team finish as runners-up at the 2022–23 PBA Commissioner's Cup and a bronze medal finish at the EASL Champions Week.

==== Winnipeg Sea Bears ====
The Winnipeg Sea Bears of the Canadian Elite Basketball League (CEBL) signed Yang on March 10, 2023. He had to deal with the Elam Ending mechanic present in the CEBL.

==== Kaohsiung 17Live Steelers ====
In Taiwan, Yang joined the Kaohsiung 17Live Steelers of the P. League+ in November 2023 and making his debut for the team the following month.

==== First Vancouver Bandits stint ====
The Vancouver Bandits of the CEBL signed in Yang in April 2024. He appeared in 24 regular games for the Bandits.

==== Eastern ====
Yang joined another Hong Kong team, Eastern in September 2024. He played for the team for the 2024–25 East Asia Super League and the 2024–25 PBA Commissioner's Cup.

==== Second Vancouver Bandits stint ====
After playing for Eastern, Yang rejoins the Vancouver Bandits of the CEBL in April 2025.

==== South China ====
Yang rejoins Hong Kong A1 sides South China for the 2026 Basketball Champions League Asia – East tournament. They went on to win the championship with Yang named Most Valuable Player.

== National team ==
Yang has played for the Hong Kong national basketball team. He debuted in the February 2025 window of the 2025 FIBA Asia Cup qualifiers.
