= Andrew Nicholson (basketball) =

Canadian basketball player (born 1989)

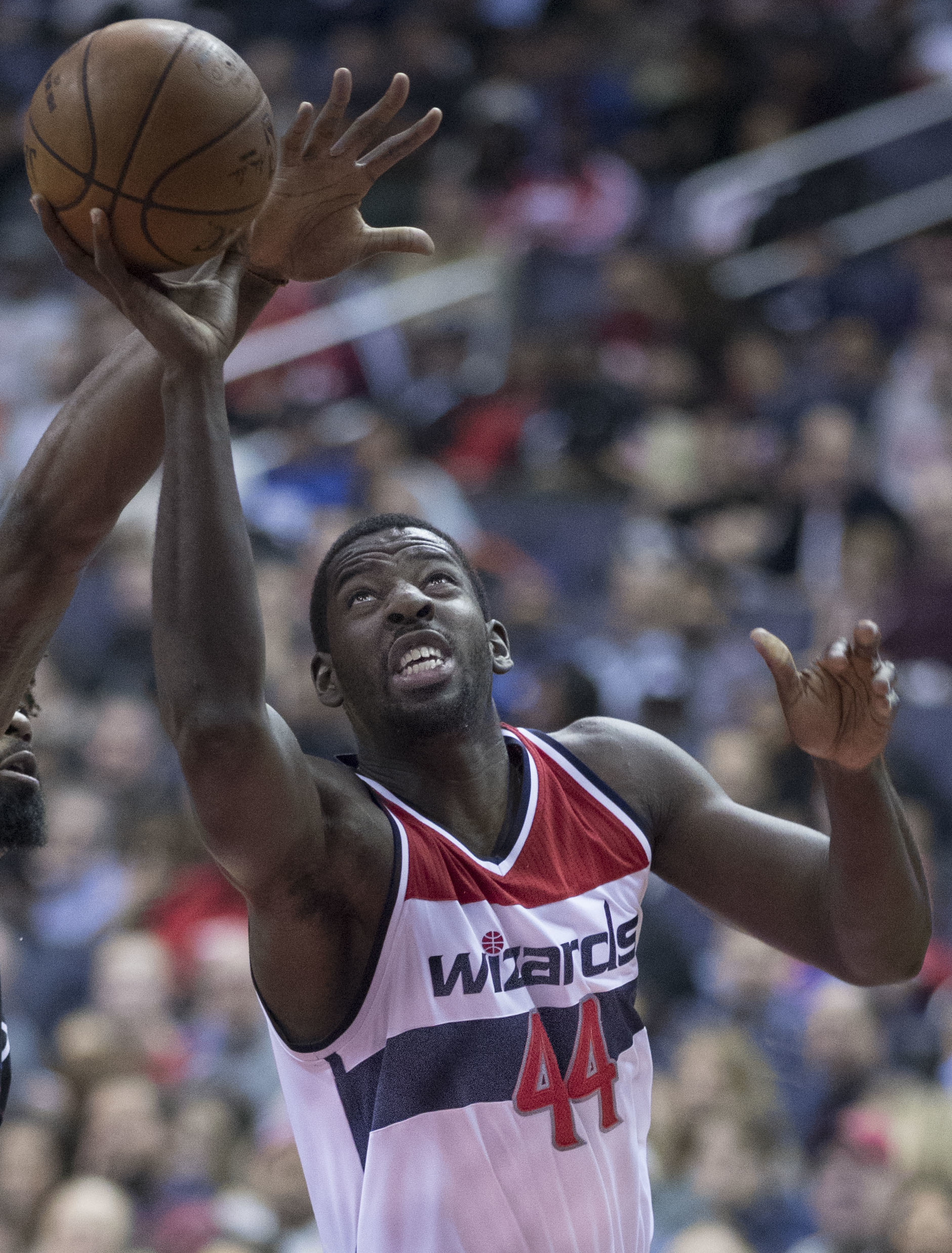
- Nicholson with the Washington Wizards in 2016

Free agent
- Position: Power forward

Personal information
- Born: December 8, 1989 (age 36) Etobicoke, Ontario, Canada
- Listed height: 6 ft 10 in (2.08 m)
- Listed weight: 250 lb (113 kg)

Career information
- High school: Father Michael Goetz (Mississauga, Ontario)
- College: St. Bonaventure (2008–2012)
- NBA draft: 2012: 1st round, 19th overall pick
- Drafted by: Orlando Magic
- Playing career: 2012–present

Career history
- 2012–2016: Orlando Magic
- 2016–2017: Washington Wizards
- 2017: Brooklyn Nets
- 2017–2018: Guangdong Southern Tigers
- 2018–2019: Fujian Sturgeons
- 2019–2020: Guangzhou Loong Lions
- 2020–2021: Fujian Sturgeons
- 2021–2022: Daegu KOGAS Pegasus
- 2022–2023: Bay Area Dragons
- 2023–2025: Daegu KOGAS Pegasus
- 2025–2026: Seoul Samsung Thunders

Career highlights
- AP Honorable mention All-American (2012); Atlantic 10 Player of the Year (2012); 2× First-team All-Atlantic 10 (2011, 2012); Second-team All-Atlantic 10 (2010); Atlantic 10 All-Defensive Team (2012); Atlantic 10 Freshman of the Year (2010); Atlantic 10 tournament MVP (2012); No. 44 retired by St. Bonaventure Bonnies
- Stats at NBA.com
- Stats at Basketball Reference
Medals
Men's basketball
Representing Canada
FIBA AmeriCup
Bronze medal – third place	2015 Mexico City
Pan American Games
Silver medal – second place	2015 Toronto

Andrew Fabian Nicholson (born December 8, 1989) is a Canadian professional basketball player who most recently played for the Seoul Samsung Thunders of the Korean Basketball League (KBL). He played college basketball for the St. Bonaventure Bonnies before being selected by the Orlando Magic with the 19th overall pick in the 2012 NBA draft.

== High school career ==
Nicholson did not start playing until he was a high school junior. Due to a broken ankle, he missed the entire summer circuit prior to his senior season. Nicholson gained recognition in his senior and 5th year. He was named to the Toronto Star High School All-Stars in 2007 and 2008, and was also named MVP of five different tournaments.

College recruiting
Name	Hometown	School	Height	Weight	Commit date
Andrew Nicholson; PF	Mississauga, ON	Father Michael Goetz Secondary School (ON)	6 ft 10 in (2.08 m)	250 lb (110 kg)	Oct 17, 2007
Andrew Nicholson; PF	Recruit ratings: Rivals: (40)				
Overall recruit ranking:
Note: In many cases, Scout, Rivals, 247Sports, On3, and ESPN may conflict in their listings of height and weight.; In these cases, the average was taken. ESPN grades are on a 100-point scale.; Sources: "2008 Team Ranking". Rivals.

== College career ==
=== Freshman year ===
As a freshman at St. Bonaventure in 2008–09, Nicholson earned Atlantic 10 Rookie of the Year honours after winning the A-10 Rookie of the Week award a program record six times. He also earned CollegeHoopsNet.com Freshman All-American team honours. He made 25 starts out of 30 games played and led all freshmen nationally in field goal percentage (.602) and blocks (81). He averaged 12.5 points and 6.0 rebounds in 25.1 minutes per game.

=== Sophomore year ===
As a sophomore in 2009–10, Nicholson earned second-team All-Atlantic 10 honours after starting all 30 games and averaging 16.4 points and 7.1 rebounds in 30.2 minutes per game. He ranked 18th nationally, and second in the A-10, in field goal percentage at .564 (198–351), the ninth-best season total in program history. He scored a season-high 29 points on two separate occasions, the first of which came on 11-of-13 shooting from the floor with a career-best 14 rebounds against Norfolk State on November 28; second came at Duquesne on January 23, where he played the full 40 minutes.

=== Junior year ===
As a junior in 2010–11, Nicholson was an Atlantic 10 Preseason and All-Defensive first team selection, and went on to earn first-team All-Atlantic 10 and first-team NABC All-District honours. He also earned Atlantic 10 Co-Player of the Week for the week of December 20 with eventual conference Player of the Year Tu Holloway. He became the 38th player in school history to surpass the 1,000-point barrier with a foul-line jumper in the first half of the Niagara game on December 11, 2010. In 31 games (all starts), he averaged 20.8 points and 7.3 rebounds in 33.8 minutes per game. He scored a career-high 44 points, on 14-of-19 field goals and 16-of-25 from the free throw line, while pulling down 12 rebounds in a four-overtime thriller against Ohio on December 18, the longest game in SBU history.

=== Senior year ===
As a senior in 2011–12, Nicholson earned Atlantic 10 Player of the Year honours in addition to All-American Honorable Mention, and first-team All-Atlantic 10 and All-Defensive team honours. He became the seventh player in the 35-year history of the league to earn both Rookie and Player of the Year honours and the first St. Bonaventure Bonnie to earn the top overall award since Earl Belcher won two in a row in 1980 and 1981. He also became the first player in the history of the league to earn four straight Player of the Week awards. He scored his 2,000th career point and averaged a double-double in the final week of the season, posting 25.5 points and 11.0 rebounds. In 32 games (all starts), he averaged 18.5 points and 8.4 rebounds in 30.1 minutes per game. He finished his four-year career at St. Bonaventure with 2,103 points, 887 rebounds and 244 blocks in 123 games (118 starts).

=== College statistics ===
Year	Team	GP	GS	MPG	FG%	3P%	FT%	RPG	APG	SPG	BPG	PPG
2008–09	St. Bonaventure	30	25	25.1	.602	.000	.613	6.0	.2	.6	2.7	12.5
2009–10	St. Bonaventure	30	30	30.2	.564	.000	.760	7.1	.5	.2	1.8	16.4
2010–11	St. Bonaventure	31	31	33.8	.571	.261	.711	7.3	1.0	.5	1.5	20.8
2011–12	St. Bonaventure	32	32	30.1	.571	.434	.776	8.4	1.0	.7	2.0	18.5
Career		123	118	29.9	.575	.377	.720	7.2	.7	.5	2.0	17.1

== Professional career ==
=== Orlando Magic (2012–2016) ===
==== 2012–13 season ====
On June 28, 2012, Nicholson was selected by the Orlando Magic with the 19th overall pick in the 2012 NBA draft. On July 3, 2012, he signed his rookie-scale contract with the Magic and joined them for the NBA Summer League. In his first summer league game, he recorded a double-double with 24 points and 12 rebounds in a win over the Brooklyn Nets. Nicholson made his regular season debut on November 2, 2012, against the Denver Nuggets, coming off the bench to record 2 points, 2 rebounds, 1 assist and 1 block in a 102–89 win. He made his first career start on December 21, 2012, against the Toronto Raptors in place of the injured Glen Davis. He finished with 6 points, 4 rebounds, 1 assist and 1 steal in a 93–90 loss. On December 29, he scored a career-high 22 points in a blowout loss to the Toronto Raptors. He recorded his first career double-double in a start against the Boston Celtics on February 1, 2013, recording 14 points and 10 rebounds in a 97–84 loss.

On February 10, 2013, Nicholson was selected to replace the injured Andre Drummond for the Rising Stars Challenge during the 2013 NBA All-Star Weekend on February 17 in Houston, Texas.

==== 2013–14 season ====
In July 2013, Nicholson re-joined the Magic for the 2013 NBA Summer League. On October 26, 2013, the Magic exercised their third-year team option on Nicholson's rookie scale contract, extending the contract through the 2014–15 season. He scored in double figures in 11 of the first 23 games, including three double-doubles. However, following the December 13 game against the Cleveland Cavaliers, Nicholson managed just four more double-figure-scoring games and finished the season averaging 5.7 points and 3.4 rebounds per game.

==== 2014–15 season ====
On October 26, 2014, the Magic exercised their fourth-year team option on Nicholson's rookie scale contract, extending the contract through the 2015–16 season. Nicholson spent most of the 2014–15 season out of the team's playing rotation. He didn't play in 38 of the Magic's first 56 games even though he was injury free, but playing time increased significantly after the All-Star break. He appeared in 22 of Orlando's final 26 games and averaged 15.1 minutes, 6.3 points and 2.6 rebounds per game over that 22-game stretch. Overall, he averaged 4.9 points and 2.1 rebounds in 40 games.

==== 2015–16 season ====
After appearing in just two of the Magic's first 11 games to start the 2015–16 season, Nicholson began to pick up game time and production from November 18 onwards. On November 23, 2015, Nicholson scored a season-high 18 points and 8 rebounds in a loss to the Cleveland Cavaliers. On December 8, 2015, he recorded 8 points and a career-high 14 rebounds in an 85–74 win over the Denver Nuggets. After going scoreless in four straight games in mid-January, Nicholson was dropped from the rotation and did not play against the Philadelphia 76ers on January 20, 2016, his first DNP since November 14, 2015. On March 20, 2016, Nicholson recorded 15 points and 9 rebounds in a 105–100 loss to the Toronto Raptors. Five days later, he scored a then season-high 19 points in a 108–97 loss to the Miami Heat. On March 29, he scored a career-high 24 points on 9-of-9 shooting in a 139–105 win over the Brooklyn Nets.

=== Washington Wizards (2016–2017) ===
On July 7, 2016, Nicholson signed a four-year, $26 million contract with the Washington Wizards. He made his debut for the Wizards in their season opener on October 27, recording nine points and seven rebounds off the bench in a 114–99 loss to the Atlanta Hawks.

=== Brooklyn Nets (2017) ===
On February 22, 2017, Nicholson was traded, along with Marcus Thornton and a 2017 first-round draft pick, to the Brooklyn Nets in exchange for Bojan Bogdanović and Chris McCullough. On March 17, 2017, he had a season-high 11 points in 17 minutes off the bench in a 98–95 loss to the Boston Celtics.

On July 25, 2017, Nicholson was traded to the Portland Trail Blazers in exchange for Allen Crabbe. On August 30, 2017, he was waived by the Trail Blazers.

=== International career (2017–2026) ===
On September 5, 2017, Nicholson signed with the Guangdong Southern Tigers of the Chinese Basketball Association. On August 11, 2018, he signed with the Fujian Sturgeons. On August 16, 2019, he joined Guangzhou Loong Lions for the 2019–20 season, averaging 26.2 points and 10.4 rebounds per game. On September 25, 2020, he returned to Fujian.

On June 30, 2021, Nicholson joined the Daegu KOGAS Pegasus of the Korean Basketball League (KBL).

On July 27, 2022, Nicholson signed with the Bay Area Dragons. He competed in the 2022-23 PBA Commissioner's Cup in the Philippines and in the 2023 EASL Champions Week with the team.

In October 2023, Nicholson rejoined the Daegu KOGAS Pegasus to replace Isaiah Hicks after Bay Area Dragons dismissed.

== NBA career statistics ==
Legend
GP	Games played	GS	Games started	MPG	Minutes per game
FG%	Field goal percentage	3P%	3-point field goal percentage	FT%	Free throw percentage
RPG	Rebounds per game	APG	Assists per game	SPG	Steals per game
BPG	Blocks per game	PPG	Points per game	**Bold**	Career high

=== Regular season ===
Year	Team	GP	GS	MPG	FG%	3P%	FT%	RPG	APG	SPG	BPG	PPG
2012–13	Orlando	75	**28**	**16.7**	**.527**	.000	.798	3.4	**.6**	.3	**.4**	**7.8**
2013–14	Orlando	**76**	5	15.4	.429	.315	.825	3.4	.3	.2	.3	5.7
2014–15	Orlando	40	3	12.3	.437	.317	.600	2.1	**.6**	.2	.3	4.9
2015–16	Orlando	56	0	14.7	.471	**.360**	.785	**3.6**	.4	.2	**.4**	6.9
2016–17	Washington	28	0	8.3	.390	.188	.583	1.2	.3	.4	.2	2.5
2016–17	Brooklyn	10	0	11.1	.382	.182	**1.000**	2.7	.3	**.5**	.0	3.0
Career		285	36	14.3	.467	.321	.773	3.0	.4	.3	.3	6.0

== Personal life ==
A native of Mississauga, Ontario, Nicholson is the son of Fabian and Colmaleen Nicholson, and has an older brother, Gary. Nicholson's family has Jamaican heritage.

Nicholson wears size 18 shoes. He has a 7 ft 4 in (2.24 m) wingspan and an 8 ft 11 in (2.72 m) standing reach, with hands 10 inches in height and 11 inches in width.

Nicholson graduated from St. Bonaventure with a degree in physics.

== See also ==
- List of Canadians in the National Basketball Association
