= Liu Chuanxing =

Chinese basketball player

No. 21 – Shanxi Loongs
- Position: Center
- League: Chinese Basketball Association

Personal information
- Born: 30 July 1997 (age 29) Puyang, Henan, China
- Listed height: 225 cm (7 ft 5 in)
- Listed weight: 130 kg (287 lb)

Career information
- Playing career: 2018–present

Career history
- 2018–2021: Qingdao Eagles
- 2021–2022: Brisbane Bullets
- 2022–2023: Bay Area Dragons
- 2023–2024: Altiri Chiba
- 2024: Hong Kong Bulls
- 2024–present: Shanxi Loongs

Career highlights
- NBL champion (2024)

Liu Chuanxing (simplified Chinese: 刘传兴; traditional Chinese: 劉傳興; pinyin: Liú Chuánxīng; born 30 July 1997) is a Chinese professional basketball player for the Shanxi Loongs of the Chinese Basketball Association. He has been a member of the China men's national basketball team.

== Early career ==
Liu played for the youth team of the Guangdong Southern Tigers. He averaged 18.6 points and 8.6 rebounds per game at the National Youth League.

== Professional career ==
=== Qingdao Eagles (2018–2021) ===
On 27 August 2018, Liu joined the Qingdao Eagles of the Chinese Basketball Association. As a rookie, he played in four games, posting an average of 0.5 points, 0.5 rebounds and 0.3 blocks in 3.0 minutes of action per game for the 2018–19 season.

In the 2019–20 season, Liu started in 28 of 43 games, averaging 7.8 points, 6.7 rebounds and 1.0 blocks in 17.81 minutes per game while shooting 58.2 percent from the field.

In the 2020–21 season, Liu made 34 starts in 51 games, logging an average of 9.4 points, 8.1 rebounds and 1.1 blocks in 21.67 minutes of play per game while shooting 66.8 percent from the field.

=== Brisbane Bullets (2021–2022) ===
On 7 September 2021, Liu signed a two-year deal with the Brisbane Bullets of the Australian National Basketball League (NBL) as a Development Player and a Special Restricted Player. He became the tallest player in league history, surpassing Sam Harris who was measured at 7 ft 3 in (2.21 m). On 3 December, Liu made his NBL debut against the Tasmania JackJumpers but went scoreless across four minutes of playing time.

=== Bay Area Dragons (2022–2023) ===
In June 2022, Liu signed with the Bay Area Dragons.

In October 2023, Liu signed with the Macau Black Bears for TAT (The Asian Tournament), but the event was cancelled.

=== Altiri Chiba (2023–2024) ===
In November 2023, Liu signed with the Altiri Chiba of the B.League.

=== Hong Kong Bulls (2024) ===
In May 2024, Liu signed with the Hong Kong Bulls of the National Basketball League (China).

== National team career ==
Liu made his international debut for China at the 2021 FIBA Asia Cup Qualifiers. In a game against Chinese Taipei, he logged 16 points and nine rebounds.

The following month, Liu suited up for the national team at the 2020 FIBA Men's Olympic Qualifying Tournaments, where he only played in one game.

== Player profile ==
Standing at 225 cm (7 ft 5 in), Liu plays the center position. He was given the nickname "Big Liu" in the NBL for his height. Liu set a record as the tallest player in league history.
