= Myles Powell =

American basketball player (born 1997)

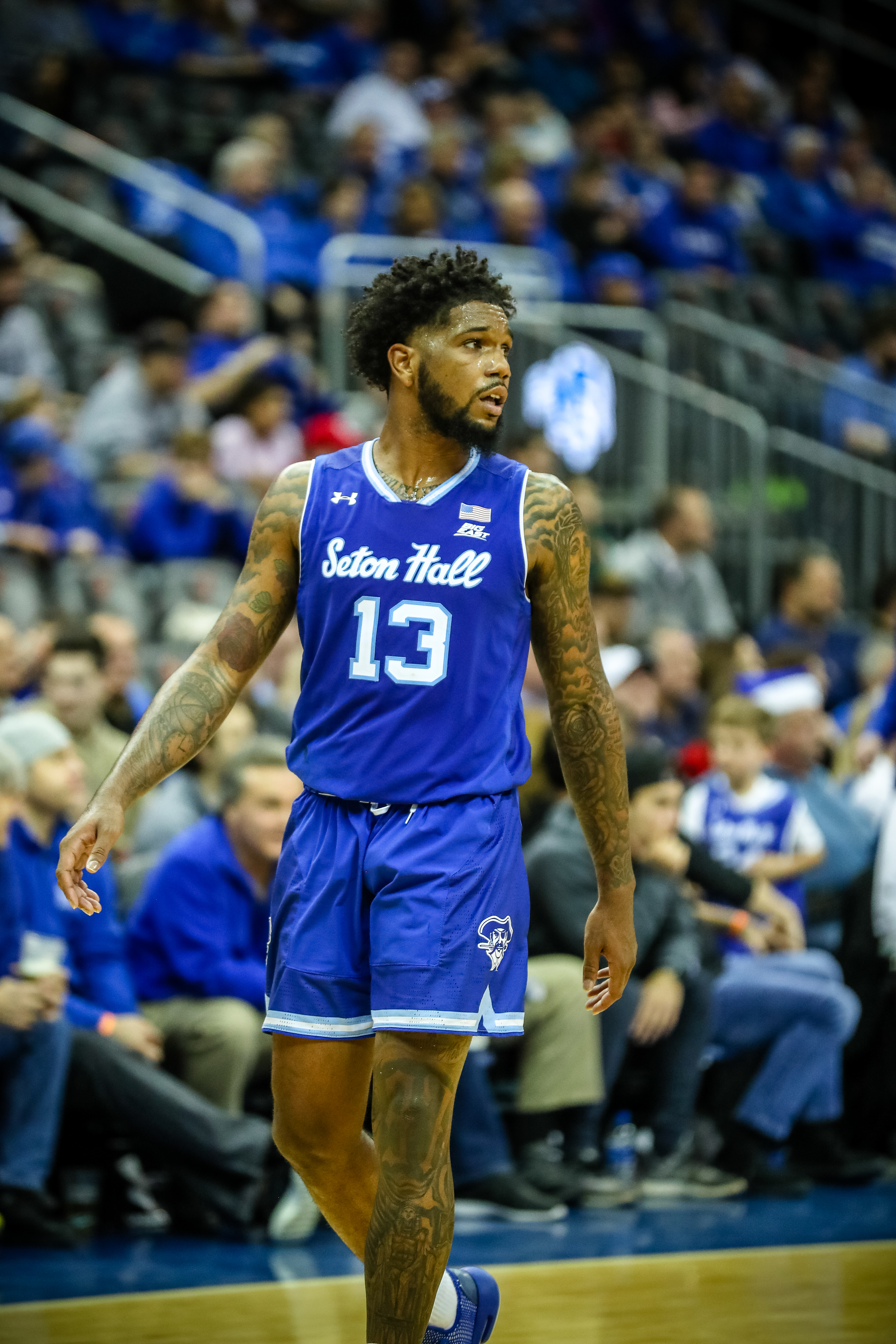
- Powell with Seton Hall in 2018

No. 13 – Scarborough Shooting Stars
- Position: Shooting guard / point guard
- League: CEBL

Personal information
- Born: July 7, 1997 (age 29) Trenton, New Jersey, U.S.
- Listed height: 6 ft 2 in (1.88 m)
- Listed weight: 195 lb (88 kg)

Career information
- High school: Trenton Catholic Academy (Trenton, New Jersey); South Kent School (South Kent, Connecticut)
- College: Seton Hall (2016–2020)
- NBA draft: 2020: undrafted
- Playing career: 2021–present

Career history
- 2021: Westchester Knicks
- 2021–2022: Philadelphia 76ers
- 2021–2022: →Delaware Blue Coats
- 2022–2023: Bay Area Dragons
- 2023–2025: Qingdao Eagles
- 2025–2026: Shandong Hi-Speed Kirin
- 2026–present: Scarborough Shooting Stars

Career highlights
- CEBL MVP (2026); Consensus first-team All-American (2020); Jerry West Award (2020); Big East Player of the Year (2020); 2× First-team All-Big East (2019, 2020); Big East Most Improved Player (2018); 2× Haggerty Award (2019, 2020)
- Stats at NBA.com
- Stats at Basketball Reference
Medals
Representing the United States
Pan American Games
Bronze medal – third place	2019 Lima	National team

Myles Blake Powell (born July 7, 1997) is an American professional basketball player for the Scarborough Shooting Stars of the Canadian Elite Basketball League (CEBL). He played college basketball for the Seton Hall Pirates.

== High school career ==
Powell attended Medford Tech, Trenton Catholic, and the South Kent School for high school, playing at the varsity level all four years of his high school career. He averaged 25 points per game and three rebounds per game at South Kent and averaged 17 points as a junior and 18.5 points as a sophomore at Trenton Catholic. Powell played AAU basketball for NJ Playaz under head coach Jimmy Salmon averaging over 18 points. He was also a participant in the Nike EYBL Peach Jam where he averaged 19.8 points. Powell also scored 17 points in the Jordan Brand Classic Regional Game and was the winner of the 2015 Big Strick Classic 3-point contest. He also participated in the 2016 National High School Three-Point Contest, held in Houston the weekend of the NCAA Final Four.

== College career ==
As a sophomore, he was named to the Big East All-Academic team. He was also named the conference Most Improved Player.

In the 2018–19 season, Powell finished second in the Big East Conference in scoring with a 23.1 point average. He had eight games of 30 or better, including a season-high 40 against Grand Canyon and 31 against Providence (1/30/2019). After losing 4 seniors from the previous year, Powell was ready to take the reins on his team, saying, “Last year, we rode Angel (Delgado) and I watched Angel go through it. Learning from the seniors and watching what they went through, now it's on me. I am definitely ready for it. I'm built for it. My coaching staff believes in me and most of all my teammates believe in me.”

In one of his most impressive performances, Powell scored 31 points against Big East rival Butler at the Prudential Center on January 9, 2019. After the game, Seton Hall coach Kevin Willard joked about Powell's performance, saying “We’ve kept it real simple — get the ball to Myles and get out of the way... That's a special play call towards the end of the game.” During the season, Powell received national attention as a part of the Wooden Award mid season watch list. Powell leads the Pirates in scoring At the close of the season, Powell was named first-team All-Big East and won the Haggerty Award as the top college player in the New York City metro area.

Entering his senior season, Powell was named a preseason first-team All-American by the Associated Press (AP) and was named preseason Big East Player of the Year. In his second game of the season, against Stony Brook, Powell suffered a serious ankle injury. Even though suffering the injury, he proceeded to play in the next game vs. #3 Michigan State and scored a game-high 37 points, though the Pirates fell 76–73. On December 14, Powell suffered a concussion during a loss to Rutgers and was ruled out indefinitely. He returned after missing two games and had 27 points, five rebounds, and five steals in a 74–66 win over DePaul on December 30. On January 15, 2020, Powell scored 29 points in a 78–70 win over fifth-ranked Butler.

On January 18, 2020, Powell surpassed the 2,000 point milestone, becoming the fifth player in school history to pass the mark. At the conclusion of the regular season, Powell was selected first-team All-Big East for the second consecutive season. Powell averaged 21.0 points, 4.3 rebounds, and 2.9 assists per game.

At the close of his senior season, Powell was named Big East Player of the Year and won the Jerry West Award. He also became the Pirates' first consensus first-team All-American since 1953 (Walter Dukes) and became the first player in school history to win the Haggerty Award twice.

== Professional career ==
=== Westchester Knicks (2021) ===
After going undrafted in the 2020 NBA draft, Powell signed with the New York Knicks on November 29, 2020. In his preseason debut for the Knicks he totaled 2 points and 1 assist in 6 minutes. He was waived on December 19, and signed with the Knicks' NBA G League affiliate, the Westchester Knicks on January 21, 2021. He played 13 games with Westchester and averaged 17.8 points on 44.6% from three, 3.3 rebounds and 4.0 assists.

On April 23, 2021, Powell signed a two-way contract with New York, but was waived the next day. On October 12, the Knicks re-signed Powell, and then waived him two days later. Eleven days later, he re-signed with Westchester, where he appeared in one game.

=== Philadelphia 76ers (2021–2022) ===
On December 19, 2021, Powell signed a two-way contract with his hometown team, the Philadelphia 76ers. Powell, who was a childhood supporter of the Philadelphia 76ers and Allen Iverson, described "having cried for the first 45 minutes" after he realized he would join the Sixers.

=== Bay Area Dragons (2022–2023) ===
On July 27, 2022, Powell signed a contract with the Bay Area Dragons of the East Asia Super League.

=== Qingdao Eagles (2023–2025) ===
On September 22, 2023, Powell signed a contract with Qingdao Eagles of the Chinese Basketball Association.

On September 19, 2024, Powell resigned a contract with Qingdao Eagles.

=== Shandong Hi-Speed Kirin (2025–2026) ===
In October 2025, Powell signed with another CBA club Shandong Hi-Speed Kirin.

=== Scarborough Shooting Stars ===
On April 29, 2026, Powell signed with the Scarborough Shooting Stars of the CEBL.

== National team career ==
In the summer of 2019, Powell was a part of the United States National team who competed at the Pan American Games in Peru. The team won bronze.

== Career statistics ==
Legend
GP	Games played	GS	Games started	MPG	Minutes per game
FG%	Field goal percentage	3P%	3-point field goal percentage	FT%	Free throw percentage
RPG	Rebounds per game	APG	Assists per game	SPG	Steals per game
BPG	Blocks per game	PPG	Points per game	**Bold**	Career high

=== NBA ===
Year	Team	GP	GS	MPG	FG%	3P%	FT%	RPG	APG	SPG	BPG	PPG
2021–22	Philadelphia	11	0	4.7	.294	.167	1.000	.5	.3	.1	.0	1.2
Career		11	0	4.7	.294	.167	1.000	.5	.3	.1	.0	1.2

=== College ===
Year	Team	GP	GS	MPG	FG%	3P%	FT%	RPG	APG	SPG	BPG	PPG
2016–17	Seton Hall	33	2	23.8	.392	.332	.817	2.2	.9	.9	**.2**	10.7
2017–18	Seton Hall	**34**	33	31.7	.433	**.379**	.789	2.6	2.8	1.0	**.2**	15.5
2018–19	Seton Hall	**34**	**34**	**36.0**	**.447**	.363	**.840**	4.0	**2.9**	**2.0**	**.2**	**23.1**
2019–20	Seton Hall	28	28	31.5	.398	.306	.795	**4.3**	**2.9**	1.2	**.2**	21.0
Career		129	97	30.8	.421	.346	.814	3.3	2.3	1.3	.2	17.5

== Personal life ==
Powell has an older brother, Noel III. On November 14, 2017, Noel Powell III was involved in a murder at an Applebee's restaurant in Lawrenceville, New Jersey, for which he was sentenced to seven years in prison in 2021. During a media day in 2019, Myles Powell stitched a message into his jacket for Noel that said: “Free Big Nutty.”

=== Seton Hall lawsuit ===
In July 2021, Myles Powell filed a lawsuit against his college team and alma mater, Seton Hall University. Filed in the New Jersey Superior Court, the lawsuit claimed Seton Hall University, its men's basketball coach, Kevin Willard, and its Director of Sports Medicine, Tony Testa, acted negligently by letting Powell play on a torn meniscus in his right knee, which he had been told was only a minor injury that would not be further injured if he continued to play during the 2019–20 season. In August 2021, Seton Hall University filed to dismiss Powell's lawsuit.
