= 2015 NBA Summer League =

- League: National Basketball Association
- Sport: Basketball
- Duration: July 4–20, 2015
- Games: 98 total games Orlando-25; Utah-6; Las Vegas-67
- Teams: Orlando-10; Utah-4; Las Vegas-24
- TV partner: NBA TV

Orlando Pro Summer League
- Season champions: Memphis Grizzlies
- Runners-up: Orlando Magic (White)
- Season MVP: Aaron Gordon
- Top scorer: Aaron Gordon

Las Vegas NBA Summer League
- Season champions: San Antonio Spurs
- Runners-up: Phoenix Suns
- Top seed: Toronto Raptors
- Season MVP: Kyle Anderson (league); Jonathon Simmons (championship game)
- Top scorer: Seth Curry

Utah Jazz Summer League
- Season champions: Utah Jazz
- Runners-up: Philadelphia 76ers
- Top seed: Utah Jazz

NBA Summer League seasons
- ← 2014 2016 →

The 2015 NBA Summer League consisted of three pro basketball leagues organized by the NBA: the Orlando Pro Summer League, Utah Jazz Summer League, and Las Vegas Summer League.

Ten teams participated in the week-long Orlando Pro Summer League at Amway Center in Orlando, Florida, from July 4 to 10, 2015. The Memphis Grizzlies won the Orlando Pro Summer League Championship over the Orlando Magic White team, 75–73, on a buzzer-beater floater by Russ Smith in double overtime. Aaron Gordon of the Orlando Magic was named the league's Most Valuable Player. The Miami Heat and Brooklyn Nets also participated in the Las Vegas Summer League.

The Utah Jazz Summer League was introduced for the first time in 2015, marking the first summer league to be played in Utah since the Rocky Mountain Revue was last held in 2008. Four teams participated in a round-robin format from July 6 to 9, 2015. No tournament was held, nor was there a champion named, but the Utah Jazz had the best record of the four teams, as they went undefeated with a 3–0 record. All four teams (Utah Jazz, Boston Celtics, Philadelphia 76ers, and San Antonio Spurs) also participated in the Las Vegas Summer League.

The Las Vegas NBA Summer League is the official summer league of the NBA. It is the premier summer league of the three, with a total of 23 teams, plus a Select Team from the NBA Development League, participating. A total of 67 games were played from July 10 to 20, 2015, across two different venues, the Thomas & Mack Center and Cox Pavilion, both located in Paradise, Nevada (near Las Vegas). The San Antonio Spurs won the championship by defeating the Phoenix Suns in the championship game, 93–90. Kyle Anderson was named the league's Most Valuable Player, with Jonathon Simmons of the Spurs being named the Championship Game MVP. The Spurs championship was historic, as they were coached by Becky Hammon, the first full-time female assistant coach in the NBA.

== Orlando Pro Summer League ==
Each team played five games. Points were awarded to teams to determine the final standings. According to NBA.com the point system works like this: each game consists of eight possible points; four points for winning the game and one point for winning a quarter (in the event of a tied quarter, each team will receive 0.5 points). In the event of ties in seeding heading into championship day, three tiebreakers will be in place: 1) total point differential; 2) total points allowed; 3) coin flip.

=== Teams ===
- Orlando Magic Blue (host)
- Orlando Magic White (host)
- Brooklyn Nets
- Charlotte Hornets
- Detroit Pistons
- Indiana Pacers
- Los Angeles Clippers
- Memphis Grizzlies
- Miami Heat
- Oklahoma City Thunder

=== Schedule ===
All times are in Eastern Daylight Time (UTC−4)

==== Day 1 ====
NBA TV

July 4
9:00 am

Boxscore

Miami Heat 92, Indiana Pacers 76
Scoring by quarter: 26–16, 17–20, 28–15, 21–25
Pts: Justise Winslow 15; Rebs: James Ennis 7 Asts: James Ennis 5	Pts: Myles Turner 20; Rebs: Myles Turner 8 Asts: Mantas Kalnietis 8

Amway Center, Orlando, Florida
Referees: Steven Anderson, Isaac Barnett, Charles Rubia

NBA TV

July 4
11:00 am

Boxscore

Detroit Pistons 76, Orlando Magic White 87
Scoring by quarter: 17–19, 25–21, 19–24, 15–23
Pts: Adonis Thomas 17; Rebs: David Wear 5 Asts: Dinwiddle, Berggren, Johnson 3 each	Pts: Keith Benson 20; Rebs: Melvin Ejim, John Bohannon 7 each Asts: Keith Appling 7

Amway Center, Orlando, Florida
Referees: Ben Taylor, Steven Perry, Phillip Moore

NBA TV

July 4
1:00 pm

Boxscore

Orlando Magic Blue 75, Los Angeles Clippers 74 (OT)
Scoring by quarter: 23–13, 17–22, 13–19, 19–18, Overtime: 3–2
Pts: Aaron Gordon 22; Rebs: Aaron Gordon 18; Asts: Elfrid Payton 9	Pts: Branden Dawson 14; Rebs: Branden Dawson 14; Asts: Diante Garrett 6

Amway Center, Orlando, Florida
Referees: Robert Felder, Brent Barnaky, Rusty Phillips

NBA TV

July 4
3:00 pm

Boxscore

Charlotte Hornets 74, Oklahoma City Thunder 76
Scoring by quarter: 17–17, 17–21, 25–17, 15–21
Pts: Frank Kaminsky 19; Rebs: Frank Kaminsky 12; Asts: Jonathon Wallace 5	Pts: Frank Gaines 17; Rebs: Mitch McGary 13; Asts: Semaj Christon 10

Amway Center, Orlando, Florida
Referees: Nate Green, Kevin Scott, Andy Nagy

NBA TV

July 4
5:00 pm

Boxscore

Memphis Grizzlies 81, Brooklyn Nets 73
Scoring by quarter: 22–15, 19–23, 26–14, 14–21
Pts: Jordan Adams 20; Rebs: Jarnell Stokes 7 Asts: Russ Smith 8	Pts: Cory Jefferson 13; Rebs: Cory Jefferson 8 Asts: Darius Adams 5

Amway Center, Orlando, Florida
Referees: Tyler Ricks, Curtis Blair, Andy O'Brien

==== Day 2 ====
NBA TV

July 5
1:00 pm

Boxscore

Los Angeles Clippers 69, Detroit Pistons 77
Scoring by quarter: 14–26, 21–22, 13–16, 21–13
Pts: Nate Wolters 20; Rebs: Liam McMorrow 9 Asts: Geron Johnson 5	Pts: Stanley Johnson 24; Rebs: Stanley Johnson 9 Asts: Spencer Dinwiddie 6

Amway Center, Orlando, Florida
Referees: Dedric Taylor, Isaac Barnett, Andy O'Brien

NBA TV

July 5
3:00 pm

Boxscore

Memphis Grizzlies 79, Charlotte Hornets 75
Scoring by quarter: 22–22, 20–14, 22–11, 15–28
Pts: Russ Smith 14; Rebs: Jarnell Stokes, Okaro White 8 each Asts: Russ Smith 7	Pts: Troy Daniels 21; Rebs: Frank Kaminsky 8 Asts: Aaron Harrison 8

Amway Center, Orlando, Florida
Referees: Steven Perry, Steven Anderson, Robert Felder

NBA TV

July 5
5:00 pm

Boxscore

Brooklyn Nets 70, Miami Heat 71
Scoring by quarter: 14–19, 20–22, 19–17, 17–13
Pts: Ryan Boatright 23; Rebs: Cliff Alexander 8 Asts: Markel Brown 4	Pts: Willie Reed 17; Rebs: Willie Reed 9 Asts: Justise Winslow, Tyler Johnson 4 each

Amway Center, Orlando, Florida
Referees: Andy Nagy, Curtis Blair, Jamal Spearman

==== Day 3 ====
NBA TV

July 6
1:00 pm

Boxscore

Indiana Pacers 76, Orlando Magic White 85
Scoring by quarter: 19–14, 21–24, 21–19, 15–28
Pts: Shayne Whittington 16; Rebs: Myles Turner 9 Asts: Joe Young, Trent Lockett 4 each	Pts: Keith Appling, Chris Singleton 17 each Rebs: Melvin Ejim 7 Asts: Ejim, Singleton, Wilbekin 3 each

Amway Center, Orlando, Florida
Referees: Charles Rubia, Phillip Moore, Brent Barnaky

NBA TV

July 6
3:00 pm

Boxscore

Orlando Magic Blue 65, Oklahoma City Thunder 73
Scoring by quarter: 16–16, 12–16, 19–16, 18–25
Pts: Aaron Gordon 21; Rebs: Aaron Gordon 10; Asts: Elfrid Payton, Peyton Siva 4 each	Pts: Mitch McGary 19; Rebs: Talib Zanna 9 Asts: Semaj Christon 9

Amway Center, Orlando, Florida
Referees: Tyler Ricks, Kevin Scott, Dedric Taylor

NBA TV

July 6
5:00 pm

Boxscore

Detroit Pistons 73, Miami Heat 78
Scoring by quarter: 22–23, 21–15, 12–20, 18–20
Pts: Stanley Johnson 14; Rebs: Stanley Johnson 7 Asts: Spencer Dinwiddie, Kelsey Barlow 4 each	Pts: Justise Winslow 17; Rebs: Willie Reed 11; Asts: Seth Tuttle 4

Amway Center, Orlando, Florida
Referees: Nate Green, Ben Taylor, Rusty Phillips

==== Day 4 ====
NBA TV

July 7
1:00 pm

Boxscore

Orlando Magic Blue 71, Memphis Grizzlies 73 (2OT)
Scoring by quarter: 27–16, 12–12, 10–19, 20–22, Overtime: 2–2, 0–2
Pts: Aaron Gordon 22; Rebs: Aaron Gordon 7 Asts: Peyton Siva 7	Pts: Russ Smith 20; Rebs: Jarnell Stokes 8 Asts: Stokes, Crocker, Smith 3 each

Amway Center, Orlando, Florida
Referees: Kevin Scott, Rusty Phillips, Andy O'Brien

NBA TV

July 7
3:00 pm

Boxscore

Brooklyn Nets 55, Charlotte Hornets 64
Scoring by quarter: 19–17, 15–24, 14–8, 7–15
Pts: Markel Brown 12; Rebs: Markel Brown 5 Asts: Ryan Boatright 4	Pts: Troy Daniels 16; Rebs: Troy Daniels 14; Asts: Aaron Harrison 4

Amway Center, Orlando, Florida
Referees: Curtis Blair, Isaac Barnett, Charles Rubia

NBA TV

July 7
5:00 pm

Boxscore

Oklahoma City Thunder 63, Los Angeles Clippers 80
Scoring by quarter: 15–24, 18–19, 20–21, 10–16
Pts: Frank Gaines 12; Rebs: Dakari Johnson 10; Asts: Quinn Cook 4	Pts: C.J. Wilcox 22; Rebs: Branden Dawson 11; Asts: D.J. Newbill, Nate Wolters 5 each

Amway Center, Orlando, Florida
Referees: Steven Anderson, Andy Nagy, Jemal Spearman

==== Day 5 ====
NBA TV

July 8
1:00 pm

Boxscore

Orlando Magic White 81, Charlotte Hornets 68
Scoring by quarter: 20–15, 23–13, 18–25, 20–15
Pts: Keith Benson 16; Rebs: Melvin Ejim 7 Asts: Bohannon, Braun, Wilbekin, Smith 3 each	Pts: Aaron Harrison 15; Rebs: Frank Kaminsky, Kevin Murphy 7 each Asts: Kevin Murphy, Jonathan Wallace 3 each

Amway Center, Orlando, Florida
Referees: Brent Barnacky, Nate Green, Phillip Moore

NBA TV

July 8
3:00 pm

Boxscore

Indiana Pacers 65, Detroit Pistons 90
Scoring by quarter: 13–21, 19–30, 16–15, 17–24
Pts: Joe Young 25; Rebs: Myles Turner 8 Asts: Joe Young 5	Pts: Stanley Johnson 20; Rebs: Stanley Johnson 10; Asts: Johnson, Dinwiddie, Hilliard 2 each

Amway Center, Orlando, Florida
Referees: Robert Felder, Curtis Blair, Steven Perry

NBA TV

July 8
5:00 pm

Boxscore

Los Angeles Clippers 85, Miami Heat 87
Scoring by quarter: 28–20, 11–21, 18–29, 28–17
Pts: Diante Garrett 20; Rebs: Branden Dawson 11; Asts: C.J. Wilcox 4	Pts: Willie Reed 17; Rebs: Willie Reed 7 Asts: Shabazz Napier 6

Amway Center, Orlando, Florida
Referees: Kevin Cutler, Steven Anderson, Tyler Ricks

==== Day 6 ====
NBA TV

July 9
1:00 pm

Boxscore

Indiana Pacers 91, Orlando Magic Blue 85
Scoring by quarter: 18–21, 25–20, 16–22, 32–22
Pts: Joe Young 28; Rebs: Arinze Onuaku 9 Asts: Trent Lockett 4	Pts: Tyler Harvey 24; Rebs: Devyn Marble, Jordan Morgan 7 each Asts: Tyler Harvey 5

Amway Center, Orlando, Florida
Referees: Kevin Scott, Isaac Barnett, Jemal Spearman

NBA TV

July 9
3:00 pm

Boxscore

Brooklyn Nets 58, Orlando Magic White 65
Scoring by quarter: 18–22, 9–10, 15–14, 16–19
Pts: Ryan Boatright 13; Rebs: Rondae Hollis-Jefferson 12; Asts: Hollis-Jefferson, Brown 3 each	Pts: Keith Appling 19; Rebs: Melvin Ejim, Keith Benson 8 each Asts: Scottie Wilbekin 3

Amway Center, Orlando, Florida
Referees: Ben Taylor, Dedric Taylor, Andy O'Brien

NBA TV

July 9
5:00 pm

Boxscore

Oklahoma City Thunder 81, Memphis Grizzlies 87
Scoring by quarter: 20–22, 20–27, 17–17, 24–21
Pts: Semaj Christon 19; Rebs: Mitch McGary 7 Asts: Christon, Cook 5 each	Pts: Jarnell Stokes 18; Rebs: Michael Holyfield 9 Asts: Andrew Harrison 6

Amway Center, Orlando, Florida
Referees: Kevin Cutler, Charles Rubia, Andy Nagy

=== Championship day ===
Each team played one game on the league's final day for either first, third, fifth, seventh or ninth place.

==== Seeding criteria ====
The seeding was determined by a team's total points after the first five days. Eight points were awarded in each game: four points for winning a game and one point for every quarter a team won. In the event of a tied quarter, each team is awarded half a point. If two or more teams had equal points, then the following tiebreakers applied:

1. Total point differential
2. Least total points allowed
3. Coin flip

Each odd-numbered seed was paired with the team seeded immediately below it. For example, the top two seeds played in the championship game, the third and fourth seeds played in the third-place game, etc.

==== Standings/seedings ====
#	Team	GP	W	L	PTS	Tiebreaker Notes
1	Orlando Magic White	4	4	0	27	
2	Memphis Grizzlies	4	4	0	25.5	
3	Miami Heat	4	4	0	25	
4	Detroit Pistons	4	2	2	16	
5	Oklahoma City Thunder	4	2	2	14.5	
6	Los Angeles Clippers	4	1	3	13	
7	Orlando Magic Blue	4	1	3	11	Point Differential -15
8	Indiana Pacers	4	1	3	11	Point Differential -44
9	Charlotte Hornets	4	1	3	10	
10	Brooklyn Nets	4	0	4	7	

==== Championship day schedule ====
All times are in Eastern Daylight Time (UTC−4)

===== 9th-place game =====
NBA TV

July 10
4:00 pm

Boxscore

Brooklyn Nets 73, Charlotte Hornets 82
Scoring by quarter: 18–17, 17–29, 23–19, 15–17
Pts: Ryan Boatright 24; Rebs: Rondae Hollis-Jefferson 11; Asts: Ryan Boatright 7	Pts: Frank Kaminsky 19; Rebs: Hairston, Daniels 8 each Asts: Troy Daniels 5

Amway Center, Orlando, Florida
Referees: Andy O'Brien, Robert Felder, Steven Anderson

===== 7th-place game =====
NBA TV

July 10
2:00 pm

Boxscore

Indiana Pacers 74, Orlando Magic Blue 98
Scoring by quarter: 16–28, 19–18, 25–29, 14–23
Pts: Joe Young 28; Rebs: Christian Watford 10; Asts: Christian Watford 4	Pts: Jordan Sibert 18; Rebs: Nnanna Egwu 11; Asts: Jabril Trawick 4

Amway Center, Orlando, Florida
Referees: Brent Barnaky, Andy Nagy, Tyler Ricks

===== 5th-place game =====
NBA TV

July 10
8:00 am

Boxscore

Los Angeles Clippers 100, Oklahoma City Thunder 101 (2OT)
Scoring by quarter: 24–23, 22–20, 26–25, 22–26, Overtime: 6–6, 0–1
Pts: Jordan Hamilton 29; Rebs: Jordan Hamilton 8 Asts: Diante Garrett 6	Pts: Semaj Christon 23; Rebs: Dakari Johnson 11; Asts: Quinn Cook 9

Amway Center, Orlando, Florida
Referees: Dedric Taylor, Nate Green, John Conley

===== 3rd-place game =====
NBA TV

July 10
10:00 am

Boxscore

Detroit Pistons 68, Miami Heat 91
Scoring by quarter: 15–17, 9–24, 26–29, 18–21
Pts: Spencer Dinwiddie 11; Rebs: Kammeon Holsey 6 Asts: Dinwiddie, Johnson 2 each	Pts: Josh Richardson 18; Rebs: Whittington, Smith 7 each Asts: Greg Whittington 4
Miami Heat wins third place playoff

Amway Center, Orlando, Florida
Referees: Phillip Moore, Charles Rubia, Curtis Blair

===== Final =====
NBA TV

July 10
12:00 pm

Boxscore

Memphis Grizzlies 75, Orlando Magic White 73 (2OT)
Scoring by quarter: 20–6, 16–28, 15–24, 22–15, Overtime: 0–0, 2–0
Pts: Russ Smith 15; Rebs: Jarnell Stokes 6 Asts: Russ Smith 9	Pts: Benson, Singleton 16 each Rebs: Keith Benson 12; Asts: Keith Appling 6
Memphis Grizzlies win Final

Amway Center, Orlando, Florida
Referees: Ben Taylor, Steven Perry, Isaac Barnett

=== Final standings ===
#	Team	GP	W	L	PCT
1	Memphis Grizzlies	5	5	0	1.000
2	Orlando Magic (White)	5	4	1	.800
3	Miami Heat	5	5	0	1.000
4	Detroit Pistons	5	2	3	.400
5	Oklahoma City Thunder	5	3	2	.600
6	Los Angeles Clippers	5	1	4	.200
7	Orlando Magic (Blue)	5	2	3	.400
8	Indiana Pacers	5	1	4	.200
9	Charlotte Hornets	5	2	3	.400
10	Brooklyn Nets	5	0	5	.000

=== Individual statistical leaders ===
Points

Player	Team	PPG
Joe Young	Indiana Pacers	22.5
Aaron Gordon	Orlando Magic (Blue)	21.7
Myles Turner	Indiana Pacers	18.7
Stanley Johnson	Detroit Pistons	16.2
Jordan Adams	Memphis Grizzlies	16.0

Rebounds

Player	Team	RPG
Aaron Gordon	Orlando Magic Blue	11.7
Branden Dawson	Los Angeles Clippers	10.3
Dakari Johnson	Oklahoma City Thunder	8.6
Myles Turner	Indiana Pacers	8.3
Troy Daniels	Charlotte Hornets	7.8

Assists

Player	Team	APG
Semaj Christon	Oklahoma City Thunder	6.8
Elfrid Payton	Orlando Magic Blue	6.5
Russ Smith	Memphis Grizzlies	6.2
Shabazz Napier	Miami Heat	6.0
Peyton Siva	Orlando Magic Blue	4.5

=== Honors ===
Josh Cohen of the Orlando Magic's website ranked the top five most valuable players in the Orlando Pro Summer League:

1. Aaron Gordon, Orlando Magic (MVP)
2. Stanley Johnson, Detroit Pistons
3. Russ Smith, Memphis Grizzlies
4. Myles Turner, Indiana Pacers
5. Justise Winslow, Miami Heat

== Utah Jazz Summer League ==
The Utah Jazz Summer League consisted of six games. Each team played three games and each team played on each day (July 6, 7, and 9).

=== Teams ===
- Utah Jazz (host)
- Philadelphia 76ers
- San Antonio Spurs
- Boston Celtics

=== Schedule ===
All times are in Eastern Daylight Time (UTC−4)

==== Day 1 ====
NBA TV

July 6
7:00 pm

Boxscore

Philadelphia 76ers 71, San Antonio Spurs 74
Scoring by quarter: 18–20, 12–14, 24–15, 17–25
Pts: Jahlil Okafor 18; Rebs: Furkan Aldemir 11; Asts: T. J. McConnell 4	Pts: Dairis Bertans 19; Rebs: Kyle Anderson 9 Asts: Ware, Bertans, Graham 3 each

Energy Solutions Arena, Salt Lake City, Utah
Attendance: 10,215
Referees: Matt Kallio, Marat Kogut, Aaron Smith

NBA TV

July 6
9:00 pm

Boxscore

Boston Celtics 82, Utah Jazz 100
Scoring by quarter: 25–20, 15–31, 22–17, 20–32
Pts: Marcus Smart 26; Rebs: Marcus Smart, Terry Rozier 5 each Asts: Marcus Smart 8	Pts: Rodney Hood 23; Rebs: Jack Cooley 13; Asts: Dante Exum 5

Energy Solutions Arena, Salt Lake City, Utah
Attendance: 10,215
Referees: Ray Acosta, Justin VanDuyne, Nate Harris

==== Day 2 ====
NBA TV

July 7
7:00 pm

Boxscore

Boston Celtics 62, Philadelphia 76ers 76
Scoring by quarter: 16–12, 10–15, 19–28, 17–21
Pts: Terry Rozier 14; Rebs: Jonathan Holmes 7 Asts: C.J. Fair 3	Pts: Okafor, McRae, Holmes 13 each Rebs: Furkan Aldemir 14; Asts: Jordan McRae, Deonte Burton 3 each

Energy Solutions Arena, Salt Lake City, Utah
Attendance: 9,408
Referees: Eric Dalen, Ray Acosta, Matt Kallio

NBA TV

July 7
9:00 pm

Boxscore

San Antonio Spurs 70, Utah Jazz 72
Scoring by quarter: 20–15, 23–22, 19–19, 8–16
Pts: Kyle Anderson 25; Rebs: Cady Lalanne 11; Asts: Casper Ware 4	Pts: Rodney Hood 18; Rebs: Jack Cooley 8 Asts: Bryce Cotton 4

Energy Solutions Arena, Salt Lake City, Utah
Attendance: 9,408
Referees: Marat Kogut, Aaron Smith, Justin VanDuyne

==== Day 3 ====
NBA TV

July 9
7:00 pm

Boxscore

Boston Celtics 85, San Antonio Spurs 71
Scoring by quarter: 13–22, 27–13, 24–22, 21–14
Pts: Marcus Smart 22; Rebs: Jordan Mickey 9 Asts: Smart, Rozier 7 each	Pts: Cady Lalanne 13; Rebs: Kyle Anderson 7 Asts: Kyle Anderson 3

Energy Solutions Arena, Salt Lake City, Utah
Attendance: 12,128
Referees: Eric Dalen, Marat Kogut, Aaron Smith

NBA TV

July 9
9:00 pm

Boxscore

Philadelphia 76ers 78, Utah Jazz 84 (OT)
Scoring by quarter: 18–29, 16–13, 20–19, 20–13, Overtime: 4–10
Pts: Jordan McRae 19; Rebs: Furkan Aldemir 15; Asts: Okafor, McConnell 3 each	Pts: Bryce Cotton 20; Rebs: Jack Cooley 8 Asts: Cotton, Johnson 5 each

Energy Solutions Arena, Salt Lake City, Utah
Attendance: 12,128
Referees: Matt Kallio, Ray Acosta, Justin VanDuyne

=== Final results ===
#	Team	GP	W	L	QW
1	Utah Jazz	3	3	0	4.5
2	Philadelphia 76ers	3	1	2	7
3	San Antonio Spurs	3	1	2	6.5
4	Boston Celtics	3	1	2	6

=== Individual statistical leaders ===
Points

Player	Team	PPG
Marcus Smart	Boston Celtics	24.0
Rodney Hood	Utah Jazz	20.5
Dante Exum	Utah Jazz	20.0
Jordan McRae	Philadelphia 76ers	15.7
Kyle Anderson	San Antonio Spurs	14.0

Rebounds

Player	Team	RPG
Furkan Aldemir	Philadelphia 76ers	13.3
Jack Cooley	Utah Jazz	9.7
Jahlil Okafor	Philadelphia 76ers	8.3
Kyle Anderson	San Antonio Spurs	8.0
Rodney Hood	Utah Jazz	7.5

Assists

Player	Team	APG
Marcus Smart	Boston Celtics	7.5
Dante Exum	Utah Jazz	5.0
Terry Rozier	Boston Celtics	3.7
Bryce Cotton	Utah Jazz	3.3
Chris Johnson	Utah Jazz	3.3

== Las Vegas Summer League ==
A total of 67 games will be played between 24 teams. The league consists of a preliminary round (July 10–14) and an elimination tournament (July 15–16 and July 18–20). Teams will be seeded after the preliminary round for the elimination tournament.

=== Teams ===
- Atlanta Hawks
- Boston Celtics
- Brooklyn Nets
- Chicago Bulls
- Cleveland Cavaliers
- Dallas Mavericks
- Denver Nuggets
- Golden State Warriors
- Houston Rockets
- Los Angeles Lakers
- Miami Heat
- Milwaukee Bucks
- Minnesota Timberwolves
- NBA D-League Select
- New Orleans Pelicans
- New York Knicks
- Philadelphia 76ers
- Phoenix Suns
- Portland Trail Blazers
- Sacramento Kings
- San Antonio Spurs
- Toronto Raptors
- Utah Jazz
- Washington Wizards

=== Schedule ===
All times are in Eastern Daylight Time (UTC−4)

==== Day 1 (July 10) ====
NBA TV

6:00 pm

Boxscore

Milwaukee Bucks 89, New Orleans Pelicans 101
Scoring by quarter: 13–29, 29–19, 22–27, 25–26
Pts: Sean Kilpatrick 24; Rebs: Kevin Jones 8 Asts: Jorge Gutierrez 4	Pts: Seth Curry 30; Rebs: Rudd, Drew, Birch 6 each Asts: Larry Drew II 6

Cox Pavilion, Paradise, Nevada
Referees: Nick Buchert, Kyle Regetz, Randy Richardson

NBA TV

6:30 pm

Boxscore

Sacramento Kings 68, Toronto Raptors 90
Scoring by quarter: 15–22, 17–23, 19–21, 17–24
Pts: James Anderson 15; Rebs: Sim Bhullar 10; Asts: Shaquielle McKissic 4	Pts: Norman Powell 20; Rebs: Ronald Roberts 12; Asts: Delon Wright 9

Thomas & Mack Center, Paradise, Nevada
Referees: Chance Moore, Lauren Holtkamp, Jaston Carter

NBA TV

8:00 pm

Boxscore

Atlanta Hawks 71, Denver Nuggets 86
Scoring by quarter: 15–24, 21–19, 15–23, 20–20
Pts: Lamar Patterson 16; Rebs: Mike Muscala 6 Asts: Patterson, Kane 3 each	Pts: Gary Harris 15; Rebs: Nikola Jokic 6 Asts: Mudiay, Green 4 each

Cox Pavilion, Paradise, Nevada
Referees: Tyler Ford, Phenizee Ransom, Nate Harris

NBA TV

8:30 pm

Boxscore

Minnesota Timberwolves 81, Los Angeles Lakers 68
Scoring by quarter: 21–22, 20–13, 15–21, 25–12
Pts: Zach LaVine 24; Rebs: Adreian Payne 9 Asts: Karl-Anthony Towns 4	Pts: Jordan Clarkson 23; Rebs: Tarik Black 13; Asts: D'Angelo Russell 6

Thomas & Mack Center, Paradise, Nevada
Referees: Ray Bullock, Karl Lane, John Butler

NBA TV

10:00 pm

Boxscore

NBA D-League Select 104, Houston Rockets 111
Scoring by quarter: 23–19, 26–36, 21–32, 34–24
Pts: Scotty Hopson 27; Rebs: Hasheem Thabeet 6 Asts: Joe Jackson 6	Pts: Alan Williams 27; Rebs: Alan Williams 10; Asts: Will Cummings 4

Cox Pavilion, Paradise, Nevada
Referees: JT Orr, Bharat Rham, Nick Heater

NBA TV

10:30 pm

Boxscore

Golden State Warriors 83, Cleveland Cavaliers 75
Scoring by quarter: 25–17, 17–16, 21–16, 20–26
Pts: James Michael McAdoo 20; Rebs: Ognjen Kuzmic 8 Asts: Aaron Craft 7	Pts: Tyler Haws 12; Rebs: Jerrelle Benimon 10; Asts: John Shurna 3

Thomas & Mack Center, Paradise, Nevada
Referees: CJ Washington, Kevin Fahy, JB DeRosa

==== Day 2 (July 11) ====
NBA TV

4:00 pm

Boxscore

New Orleans Pelicans 90, Dallas Mavericks 86
Scoring by quarter: 25–20, 27–24, 20–23, 18–19
Pts: Seth Curry 25; Rebs: Birch, Curry, Drew 6 each Asts: Larry Drew II 5	Pts: Justin Anderson 23; Rebs: Dwight Powell 14; Asts: Kevin Pangos 6

Cox Pavilion, Paradise, Nevada
Referees: Tre Maddox, Ray Acosta, Didier Shema-Maboko, Omar Bermudez

NBA TV

4:30 pm

Boxscore

New York Knicks 78, San Antonio Spurs 73
Scoring by quarter: 18–17, 20–20, 11–17, 29–19
Pts: Cleanthony Early 18; Rebs: Travis Wear 10; Asts: Early, Grant 3 each	Pts: Kyle Anderson 23; Rebs: Lalanne, Scott, Simmons 6 each Asts: Shannon Scott 3

Thomas & Mack Center, Paradise, Nevada
Referees: Tweety Carter, Eddie Viator, CJ Washington

NBA TV

6:00 pm

Boxscore

Washington Wizards 77, Phoenix Suns 86
Scoring by quarter: 9–20, 21–23, 26–20, 21–23
Pts: Kelly Oubre 20; Rebs: Famous, Oubre 10 each Asts: Scott Machado 4	Pts: Archie Goodwin 22; Rebs: Alex Len 8 Asts: Mickey McConnell 6

Cox Pavilion, Paradise, Nevada
Referees: Matthew Beattie, JT Orr, Aaron Smith

NBA TV

6:30 pm

Boxscore

Chicago Bulls 84, Minnesota Timberwolves 71
Scoring by quarter: 21–14, 21–23, 19–10, 23–24
Pts: Bobby Portis 23; Rebs: Cameron Bairstow 6 Asts: Cameron Bairstow 9	Pts: Zach LaVine 20; Rebs: LaVine, Payne, Towns 9 each Asts: Jones, Brown 3 each

Thomas & Mack Center, Paradise, Nevada
Referees: Gediminas Petraitis, Jason Goldenberg, Arnauld Kom Njilo, Benjamin Jiminez

NBA TV

8:00 pm

Boxscore

Boston Celtics 85, Portland Trail Blazers 76
Scoring by quarter: 30–20, 21–13, 13–24, 21–19
Pts: Marcus Smart 19; Rebs: Jordan Mickey 10; Asts: Smart, Rozier 3 each	Pts: Allen Crabbe 15; Rebs: Malcolm Thomas 10; Asts: Tim Frazier 9

Cox Pavilion, Paradise, Nevada
Referees: Anthony Burris, Kevin Cutler, Vladimir Voyard-Tadal

NBA TV

8:30 pm

Boxscore

Los Angeles Lakers 68, Philadelphia 76ers 60
Scoring by quarter: 18–11, 9–21, 28–19, 13–9
Pts: Jordan Clarkson 19; Rebs: D'Angelo Russell 8 Asts: D'Angelo Russell 3	Pts: Jahlil Okafor 19; Rebs: Jahlil Okafor 9 Asts: J.P. Tokoto 5

Thomas & Mack Center, Paradise, Nevada
Referees: Mitchell Ervin, Josue Nieves, Kevin Fahy

NBA TV

10:00 pm

Boxscore

Brooklyn Nets 76, Cleveland Cavaliers 75
Scoring by quarter: 24–16, 14–24, 17–23, 21–12
Pts: Ryan Boatright 16; Rebs: Willie Reed 10; Asts: Rondae Hollis-Jefferson 4	Pts: Benimon, Seeley 11 each Rebs: Jerrelle Benimon 12; Asts: D.J. Seeley 5

Cox Pavilion, Paradise, Nevada
Referees: Rabah Noujaim, Scott Twardoski, JB DeRosa

NBA TV

10:30 pm

Boxscore

Miami Heat 82, Utah Jazz 79
Scoring by quarter: 19–18, 20–17, 20–20, 23–24
Pts: Josh Richardson 16; Rebs: Greg Whittington 10; Asts: Shabazz Napier 4	Pts: Bryce Cotton 28; Rebs: Jack Cooley 8 Asts: Bryce Cotton 4

Thomas & Mack Center, Paradise, Nevada
Referees: Brett Nansel, Bharat Rham, Ray Bullock

==== Day 3 (July 12) ====
NBA TV

4:00 pm

Boxscore

Washington Wizards 74, NBA D-League Select 94
Scoring by quarter: 19–25, 14–25, 21–20, 20–24
Pts: Jarrid Famous 21; Rebs: Jarrid Famous 10; Asts: Scott Machado 3	Pts: Scotty Hopson 20; Rebs: Casey Prather 8 Asts: Davion Berry 5

Cox Pavilion, Paradise, Nevada
Referees: Mitchell Ervin, Jaston Carter, Brandon Adair

NBA TV

4:30 pm

Boxscore

Phoenix Suns 89, Houston Rockets 108
Scoring by quarter: 19–30, 26–27, 27–22, 17–29
Pts: T. J. Warren 22; Rebs: Archie Goodwin 6 Asts: Mike James 8	Pts: DJ Kennedy 21; Rebs: Harrell, Williams 8 each Asts: Will Cummings 7

Thomas & Mack Center, Paradise, Nevada
Referees: Scott Twardoski, Josue Nieves, Suyash Mehta

NBA TV

6:00 pm

Boxscore

Chicago Bulls 66, Toronto Raptors 81
Scoring by quarter: 16–24, 12–18, 20–15, 18–24
Pts: McDermott, Bairstow 11 each Rebs: Cameron Bairstow 10; Asts: Galloway, Blue 3 each	Pts: Norman Powell 19; Rebs: Lucas Nogueira 12; Asts: Gary Talton 4

Cox Pavilion, Paradise, Nevada
Referees: Marat Kogut, Jason Goldenberg, John Butler

NBA TV

6:30 pm

Boxscore

Milwaukee Bucks 74, San Antonio Spurs 89
Scoring by quarter: 16–11, 20–28, 18–28, 20–22
Pts: Clark, Gutierrez, Kilpatrick, Vaughn 11 each Rebs: Micheal Eric 9 Asts: Rashad Vaughn 4	Pts: Kyle Anderson 22; Rebs: Shannon Scott 7 Asts: Shannon Scott 7

Thomas & Mack Center, Paradise, Nevada
Referees: Lauren Holtkamp, Vladimir Voyard-Tadal, Anthony Burris

NBA TV

8:00 pm

Boxscore

Sacramento Kings 76, Denver Nuggets 98
Scoring by quarter: 21–18, 23–33, 14–24, 18–23
Pts: David Wear 19; Rebs: Eric Moreland 7 Asts: David Stockton 5	Pts: Clark, Mudiay 19 each Rebs: Nikola Jokic 11; Asts: Emmanuel Mudiay 10

Cox Pavilion, Paradise, Nevada
Referees: Justin VanDuyne, Brett Nansel, Randy Richardson

NBA TV

8:30 pm

Boxscore

Golden State Warriors 70, Atlanta Hawks 71
Scoring by quarter: 15–14, 15–18, 20–14, 20–25
Pts: James Michael McAdoo 17; Rebs: Ognjen Kuzmic 11; Asts: Aaron Craft 5	Pts: Holt, Glenn Robinson 13 each Rebs: Walter Tavares 6 Asts: Patterson, Muscala 3

Thomas & Mack Center, Paradise, Nevada
Referees: Gediminas Petraitis, Kyle Regetz, Charles Watson

NBA TV

10:00 pm

Boxscore

Portland Trail Blazers 93, Dallas Mavericks 80
Scoring by quarter: 21–16, 27–16, 21–21, 24–27
Pts: Allen Crabbe 24; Rebs: Noah Vonleh 7 Asts: Tim Frazier 8	Pts: Dwight Powell 25; Rebs: Dwight Powell 8 Asts: Kevin Pangos 6

Cox Pavilion, Paradise, Nevada
Referees: Kevin Cutler, Jacyn Goble, William Mensah

NBA TV

10:30 pm

Boxscore

Philadelphia 76ers 76, Boston Celtics 85
Scoring by quarter: 19–20, 17–20, 14–23, 26–22
Pts: Scotty Wilbekin 19; Rebs: Arsalan Kazemi 13; Asts: Zack, Jackson 3 each	Pts: Terry Rozier 22; Rebs: Jordan Mickey 11; Asts: Terry Rozier 5

Thomas & Mack Center, Paradise, Nevada
Referees: Karl Lane, Phenizee Ransom, Sir Allen Conner

==== Day 4 (July 13) ====
NBA TV

4:00 pm

Boxscore

Cleveland Cavaliers 94, Milwaukee Bucks 87 (OT)
Scoring by quarter: 15–21, 21–17, 14–25, 37–24, Overtime: 7–0
Pts: D.J. Seeley 14; Rebs: Rakeem Christmas 11; Asts: 7 tied at 1	Pts: Rashad Vaughn 18; Rebs: Jones, Eric 6 each Asts: Jorge Gutierrez 8

Cox Pavilion, Paradise, Nevada
Referees: Kevin Scott, Lauren Holtkamp, Nick Heater

NBA TV

4:30 pm

Boxscore

New Orleans Pelicans 89, Brooklyn Nets 83
Scoring by quarter: 25–17, 22–31, 22–15, 20–20
Pts: Bryce Dejean-Jones 26; Rebs: Khem Birch 11; Asts: Larry Drew II 16	Pts: Rondae Hollis-Jefferson 18; Rebs: Willie Reed 7 Asts: Reed, Adams 3 each

Thomas & Mack Center, Paradise, Nevada
Referees: Tre Maddox, Jaston Carter, Brandon Adair

NBA TV

6:00 pm

Boxscore

NBA D-League Select 84, Atlanta Hawks 74
Scoring by quarter: 20–21, 30–13, 17–15, 17–25
Pts: Justin Dentmon 15; Rebs: Scotty Hopson 8 Asts: Joe Jackson 4	Pts: Lamar Patterson 15; Rebs: Edy Tavares 10; Asts: Terran Petteway 4

Cox Pavilion, Paradise, Nevada
Referees: Brent Barnaky, Karl Lane, Phenizee Ransom

NBA TV

6:30 pm

Boxscore

Golden State Warriors 71, Sacramento Kings 90
Scoring by quarter: 16–23, 19–28, 12–25, 24–14
Pts: Sutton, Nastic 14 each Rebs: Kevon Looney 7 Asts: Craft, Stainbrook 3 each	Pts: James Anderson 17; Rebs: Willie Cauley-Stein 8 Asts: Julyan Stone 9

Thomas & Mack Center, Paradise, Nevada
Referees: JT Orr, Justin VanDuyne, John Butler

NBA TV

8:00 pm

Boxscore

Miami Heat 83, Denver Nuggets 86
Scoring by quarter: 21–16, 20–20, 24–25, 18–25
Pts: Shabazz Napier 20; Rebs: Olaseni, Napier 6 each Asts: Shabazz Napier 6	Pts: Ian Clark 19; Rebs: Joffrey Lauvergne 9 Asts: Emmanuel Mudiay 8

Cox Pavilion, Paradise, Nevada
Referees: Ben Taylor, Bharat Ram, Sir Allen Conner

NBA TV

8:30 pm

Boxscore

Los Angeles Lakers 66, New York Knicks 76
Scoring by quarter: 5–19, 26–17, 17–25, 18-15
Pts: Jabari Brown 20; Rebs: Randle, Nance 6 each Asts: Julius Randle 2	Pts: Early, Galloway 13 each Rebs: Early, Galloway 9 each Asts: Jerian Grant 8

Thomas & Mack Center, Paradise, Nevada
Referees: Nick Buchert, Aaron Smith, Ray Acosta

NBA TV

10:00 pm

Boxscore

Toronto Raptors 95, Houston Rockets 87
Scoring by quarter: 14–24, 27–12, 21–18, 33–33
Pts: Norman Powell 19; Rebs: Lucas Nogueira 13; Asts: Lucas Nogueira 3	Pts: Glen Rice Jr. 28; Rebs: D. J. Kennedy 9 Asts: Glen Rice Jr. 4

Cox Pavilion, Paradise, Nevada
Referees: Dedric Taylor, JB DeRosa, Kyle Regetz

NBA TV

10:30 pm

Boxscore

Utah Jazz 91, Minnesota Timberwolves 82
Scoring by quarter: 17–15, 32–20, 15–22, 27–25
Pts: Jared Cunningham 17; Rebs: Trey Lyles 9 Asts: Bryce Cotton 6	Pts: Adreian Payne 18; Rebs: Karl-Anthony Towns 10; Asts: Jeffers, Brown 4 each

Thomas & Mack Center, Paradise, Nevada
Referees: Eric Dalen, Tyler Ford, AJ Desai

==== Day 5 (July 14) ====
NBA TV

3:00 pm

Boxscore

Portland Trail Blazers 75, San Antonio Spurs 79
Scoring by quarter: 19–17, 12–17, 17–17, 27–28
Pts: Noah Vonleh 20; Rebs: Noah Vonleh 8 Asts: Tim Frazier 8	Pts: Kyle Anderson 19; Rebs: Jarrell Eddie 5 Asts: 5 tied with 2 each

Cox Pavilion, Paradise, Nevada
Referees: JT Orr, Jason Goldenberg, Kerby Sitton

NBA TV

3:30 pm

Boxscore

Washington Wizards 85, Dallas Mavericks 79
Scoring by quarter: 26–18, 16–16, 23–19, 20–26
Pts: Jarrid Famous 16; Rebs: Famous, Jones 9 each Asts: Scott Machado 5	Pts: Dwight Powell 18; Rebs: Jeremy Tyler 10; Asts: Kevin Pangos 3

Thomas & Mack Center, Paradise, Nevada
Referees: Steven Anderson, Brett Nansel, Jacyn Goble

NBA TV

5:00 pm

Boxscore

Brooklyn Nets 87, Chicago Bulls 86
Scoring by quarter: 21–29, 15–19, 26–17, 25–21
Pts: Ryan Boatright 21; Rebs: Hollis-Jefferson, Mitchell, Alexander 6 each Asts: Markel Brown 4	Pts: Doug McDermott 19; Rebs: Bobby Portis 10; Asts: Diante Garrett 8

Cox Pavilion, Paradise, Nevada
Referees: Ben Taylor, Gediminas Petraitis, Vladimir Voyard-Tadal

NBA TV

5:30 pm

Boxscore

New York Knicks 84, Philadelphia 76ers 81 (OT)
Scoring by quarter: 11–24, 24–15, 15–18, 29–22, Overtime: 5–2
Pts: Maurice Ndour 23; Rebs: Maurice Ndour 6 Asts: Jerian Grant 4	Pts: Scotty Wilbekin 26; Rebs: Arsalan Kazemi 8 Asts: T. J. McConnell 5

Thomas & Mack Center, Paradise, Nevada
Referees: Kevin Cutler, Charles Watson, Josue Nieves

NBA TV

7:00 pm

Boxscore

Miami Heat 69, Boston Celtics 101
Scoring by quarter: 16–22, 21–26, 18–17, 14–36
Pts: Greg Whittington 18; Rebs: Greg Whittington 8 Asts: Josh Richardson 4	Pts: Marcus Thornton 21; Rebs: Jordan Mickey 11; Asts: Terry Rozier 7

Cox Pavilion, Paradise, Nevada
Referees: Dedric Taylor, Mitchell Ervin, JB DeRosa

NBA TV

7:30 pm

Boxscore

Phoenix Suns 91, Utah Jazz 82
Scoring by quarter: 23–22, 23–17, 24–21, 21–22
Pts: Devin Booker 18; Rebs: Alex Len 14; Asts: 7 tied at 2 each	Pts: Cotton, Johnson, Cunningham 13 each Rebs: JaJuan Johnson 9 Asts: Jared Cunningham 2

Thomas & Mack Center, Paradise, Nevada
Referees: Scott Twardoski, CJ Washington, AJ Desai

=== Championship ===
The championship is determined by a single-elimination tournament; the top 8 teams receive a first-round bye.

==== Seeding criteria ====
Teams are seeded first by overall record, then by a tiebreaker system

1. Head-to-head result (applicable only to ties between two teams, not to multiple-team ties)
2. Quarter point system (1 point for win, .5 for tie, 0 for loss, 0 for overtime periods)
3. Point differential
4. Coin flip

The head-to-head result is extremely unlikely to apply in determining seeding, since the teams play only three games before being seeded. It is impossible for two teams to both be 3-0 or 0-3 and have played one another. It is also very unlikely that exactly two teams and no others finish either 2-1 or 1-2 and for those two teams to have played one another. Even in the situation where there is a multiple-team tie and some but not all the teams have superior or inferior quarter points, the remaining teams look first to the point differential even if only two teams remain. Unlike tiebreak criteria often found in sports leagues, multiple-team ties that are reduced to two teams by progression through the tiebreaker steps are not returned to the first step of the two-team tiebreaker.

First-round losers played consolation games to determine 17th through 24th places based on the tiebreaker system stated above. Second-round losers played consolation games to determine ninth through 16th places.

==== Standings/seedings ====
#	Team	GP	W	L	PCT	QP	Point Differential (Tiebreaker)
1	Toronto Raptors	3	3	0	1.000	9.5	
2	Boston Celtics	3	3	0	1.000	9	
3	Denver Nuggets	3	3	0	1.000	8	
4	New Orleans Pelicans	3	3	0	1.000	7.5	
5	New York Knicks	3	3	0	1.000	6.5	
6	NBA D-League Select	3	2	1	.667	7	+23
7	San Antonio Spurs	3	2	1	.667	7	+14
8	Phoenix Suns	3	2	1	.667	7	-1
9	Houston Rockets	3	2	1	.667	6.5	
10	Brooklyn Nets	3	2	1	.667	5.5	
11	Los Angeles Lakers	3	1	2	.333	7	
12	Golden State Warriors	3	1	2	.333	6	
13	Utah Jazz	3	1	2	.333	5.5	-3
14	Atlanta Hawks	3	1	2	.333	5.5	-24
15	Portland Trail Blazers	3	1	2	.333	5	0
16	Cleveland Cavaliers	3	1	2	.333	5	-2
17	Chicago Bulls	3	1	2	.333	5	-3
18	Minnesota Timberwolves	3	1	2	.333	5	-9
19	Miami Heat	3	1	2	.333	5	-32
20	Washington Wizards	3	1	2	.333	4.5	
21	Sacramento Kings	3	1	2	.333	4	
22	Dallas Mavericks	3	0	3	.000	5	
23	Philadelphia 76ers	3	0	3	.000	4	-20
24	Milwaukee Bucks	3	0	3	.000	4	-34

==== Tournament bracket ====
First Round (July 15)
16	Cleveland Cavaliers	73
17	Chicago Bulls	91
9	Houston Rockets	93
24	Milwaukee Bucks	97
12	Golden State Warriors	83
21	Sacramento Kings	67
13	Utah Jazz	78
20	Washington Wizards	86
14	Atlanta Hawks	75
19	Miami Heat	64
11	Los Angeles Lakers	86
22	Dallas Mavericks	88
10	Brooklyn Nets	75
23	Philadelphia 76ers	68
15	Portland Trail Blazers	82
18	Minnesota Timberwolves	77

Second Round (July 16)
1	Toronto Raptors	80
17	Chicago Bulls	84
24	Milwaukee Bucks	80
8	Phoenix Suns	106
5	New York Knicks	54
12	Golden State Warriors	76
20	Washington Wizards	81
4	New Orleans Pelicans	97
3	Denver Nuggets	73
14	Atlanta Hawks	82
22	Dallas Mavericks	104
6	NBA D-League Select	88
7	San Antonio Spurs	74
10	Brooklyn Nets	71
15	Portland Trail Blazers	85
2	Boston Celtics	91

Quarterfinals (July 18)
17	Chicago Bulls	84
8	Phoenix Suns	91
12	Golden State Warriors	91
4	New Orleans Pelicans	100
14	Atlanta Hawks	91
22	Dallas Mavericks	83
7	San Antonio Spurs	95
2	Boston Celtics	93

Semifinals (July 19)
8	Phoenix Suns	93
4	New Orleans Pelicans	87
14	Atlanta Hawks	68
7	San Antonio Spurs	75

Final (July 20)
8	Phoenix Suns	90
7	San Antonio Spurs	93

==== Tournament schedule ====
All times are in Eastern Daylight Time (UTC−4)

===== First round (July 15) =====
NBA TV

4:00 pm

Boxscore

#24 Milwaukee Bucks 97, #9 Houston Rockets 93
Scoring by quarter: 27–21, 24–23, 23–22, 23–27
Pts: Sean Kilpatrick 26; Rebs: Kevin Jones 9 Asts: Gutierrez, Randle 9 each	Pts: Alan Williams 17; Rebs: Alan Williams 8 Asts: Rice, Henry 3 each

Cox Pavilion, Paradise, Nevada
Referees: Kevin Scott, Gediminas Petraitis, Kerby Sitton

NBA TV

4:30 pm

Boxscore

#23 Philadelphia 76ers 68, #10 Brooklyn Nets 75
Scoring by quarter: 7–23, 21–20, 27–15, 13–17
Pts: Scotty Wilbekin 11; Rebs: Arsalan Kazemi 7 Asts: T. J. McConnell 4	Pts: Markel Brown 23; Rebs: Willie Reed 9 Asts: Brown, Adams 4

Thomas & Mack Center, Paradise, Nevada
Referees: Nick Buchert, Brett Nansel, Kyle Regetz

NBA TV

6:00 pm

Boxscore

#19 Miami Heat 64, #14 Atlanta Hawks 75
Scoring by quarter: 19–23, 21–19, 13–18, 11–15
Pts: Shabazz Napier 21; Rebs: Greg Whittington 10; Asts: 4 tied at 2 each	Pts: Mike Muscala 15; Rebs: Mike Muscala 12; Asts: Muscala, Patterson 5 each

Cox Pavilion, Paradise, Nevada
Referees: Steven Anderson, Marat Kogut, Josue Nieves

NBA TV

6:30 pm

Boxscore

#21 Sacramento Kings 67, #12 Golden State Warriors 83
Scoring by quarter: 27–18, 20–22, 4–20, 16–23
Pts: David Stockton 17; Rebs: Eric Moreland 7 Asts: David Stockton 4	Pts: James Michael McAdoo 20; Rebs: James Michael McAdoo 9 Asts: Aaron Craft 4

Thomas & Mack Center, Paradise, Nevada
Referees: Scott Twardoski, Tyler Ford, Greg Danridge

NBA TV

8:00 pm

Boxscore

#20 Washington Wizards 86, #13 Utah Jazz 78
Scoring by quarter: 33–18, 19–17, 22–23, 12-20
Pts: Scott Machado 17; Rebs: Orlando Johnson 11; Asts: Scott Machado 8	Pts: Bryce Cotton 20; Rebs: Trey Lyles 7 Asts: Jared Cunningham 5

Cox Pavilion, Paradise, Nevada
Referees: Karl Lane, Jacyn Goble, Brandon Adair

NBA TV

8:30 pm

Boxscore

#22 Dallas Mavericks 88, #11 Los Angeles Lakers 86
Scoring by quarter: 30–20, 20–18, 18–25, 20-23
Pts: Jeremy Tyler 25; Rebs: Jeremy Tyler 11; Asts: Powell, Pangos 4 each	Pts: Jabari Brown 19; Rebs: Brown, Russell 6 each Asts: D'Angelo Russell 5

Thomas & Mack Center, Paradise, Nevada
Referees: Tre Maddox, CJ Washington, Ray Acosta

NBA TV

10:00 pm

Boxscore

#17 Chicago Bulls 91, #16 Cleveland Cavaliers 73
Scoring by quarter: 19–14, 22–19, 29–20, 21–20
Pts: McDermott, Portis, Blue 16 each Rebs: Bobby Portis 10; Asts: Diante Garrett 6	Pts: D.J. Seeley 16; Rebs: Jerrelle Benimon 8 Asts: Cook, Seeley 3 each

Cox Pavilion, Paradise, Nevada
Referees: Justin VanDuyne, Bharat Ram, Jason Baker

NBA TV

10:30 pm

Boxscore

#18 Minnesota Timberwolves 77, #15 Portland Trail Blazers 82
Scoring by quarter: 19–26, 20–19, 20–18, 18–19
Pts: Karl-Anthony Towns 20; Rebs: Karl-Anthony Towns 10; Asts: Lorenzo Brown 4	Pts: Noah Vonleh 16; Rebs: Noah Vonleh 10; Asts: Tim Frazier 6

Thomas & Mack Center, Paradise, Nevada
Referees: Kevin Cutler, Aaron Smith, Mitchell Ervin

===== Second round (July 16) =====
NBA TV

4:00 pm

Boxscore

#24 Milwaukee Bucks 80, #8 Phoenix Suns 106
Scoring by quarter: 25–19, 27–31, 14–30, 14–26
Pts: Rashad Vaughn 17; Rebs: Michael Eric 9 Asts: Jorge Gutierrez 6	Pts: T. J. Warren 23; Rebs: Alex Len 9 Asts: Harrellson, McNeal 5 each

Cox Pavilion, Paradise, Nevada
Referees: Dedric Taylor, Ray Acosta, J.B. DeRosa

NBA TV

4:30 pm

Boxscore

#12 Golden State Warriors 76, #5 New York Knicks 54
Scoring by quarter: 13–15, 21–7, 25–19, 17–13
Pts: James Michael McAdoo 16; Rebs: James Michael McAdoo 9 Asts: Aaron Craft 4	Pts: Jerian Grant 14; Rebs: Maurice Ndour 6 Asts: Jerian Grant 3

Thomas & Mack Center, Paradise, Nevada
Referees: JT Orr, Kyle Regetz, Sir Allen Conner

NBA TV

6:00 pm

Boxscore

#10 Brooklyn Nets 71, #7 San Antonio Spurs 74
Scoring by quarter: 13–21, 15–15, 24–14, 19–24
Pts: Markel Brown 17; Rebs: Cliff Alexander 13; Asts: Darius Adams 5	Pts: Kyle Anderson 21; Rebs: Kyle Anderson 9 Asts: Jonathon Simmons 5

Cox Pavilion, Paradise, Nevada
Referees: Karl Lane, John Butler, William Mensah

NBA TV

6:30 pm

Boxscore

#22 Dallas Mavericks 104, #6 NBA D-League Select 88
Scoring by quarter: 17–20, 31–21, 33–27, 23–20
Pts: Justin Anderson 23 each Rebs: Jeremy Tyler 11; Asts: Kevin Pangos 8	Pts: Justin Dentmon 31; Rebs: Scotty Hopson 5 Asts: Scotty Hopson 4

Thomas & Mack Center, Paradise, Nevada
Referees: Ben Taylor, Jaston Carter, Jason Baker

NBA TV

8:00 pm

Boxscore

#20 Washington Wizards 81, #4 New Orleans Pelicans 97
Scoring by quarter: 18–25, 23–24, 25–26, 15–22
Pts: Scott Machado 17; Rebs: Shawn Jones 11; Asts: Orlando Johnson 5	Pts: Seth Curry 26; Rebs: Birch, Rudd 8 each Asts: Larry Drew II 5

Cox Pavilion, Paradise, Nevada
Referees: Brent Barnaky, Aaron Smith, Phenizee Ransom

NBA TV

8:30 pm

Boxscore

#14 Atlanta Hawks 82, #3 Denver Nuggets 73
Scoring by quarter: 18–15, 19–17, 24–24, 21–17
Pts: Brandon Ashley 18; Rebs: Terran Petteway 9 Asts: Terran Petteway 7	Pts: Erick Green 17; Rebs: Joffrey Lauvergne 11; Asts: Ian Clark 8

Thomas & Mack Center, Paradise, Nevada
Referees: Lauren Holtkamp, AJ Desai, Charles Watson

NBA TV

10:00 pm

Boxscore

#17 Chicago Bulls 84, #1 Toronto Raptors 80
Scoring by quarter: 12–27, 19–17, 21–16, 32–20
Pts: Doug McDermott 28; Rebs: Doug McDermott 8 Asts: Garrett, Blue 4 each	Pts: Caboclo, Powell 15 each Rebs: Lucas Nogueira 16; Asts: Nogueira, Talton 4 each

Cox Pavilion, Paradise, Nevada
Referees: Eric Dalen, Bharat Ramnanan, Greg Danridge

NBA TV

10:30 pm

Boxscore

#15 Portland Trail Blazers 85, #2 Boston Celtics 91
Scoring by quarter: 28–23, 15–24, 16–21, 26–23
Pts: James, Vonleh 20 each Rebs: Noah Vonleh 9 Asts: Tim Frazier 8	Pts: Terry Rozier 19; Rebs: Jordan Mickey 11; Asts: R.J. Hunter 4

Thomas & Mack Center, Paradise, Nevada
Referees: Jason Goldenberg, Vladimir Voyard-Tadal, Matthew Myers

===== Consolation round (July 17) =====
NBA TV

4:00 pm

Boxscore

#23 Philadelphia 76ers 100, #9 Houston Rockets 96
Scoring by quarter: 22–24, 27–21, 27–23, 24–28
Pts: JaKarr Sampson 24; Rebs: Vince Hunter 11; Asts: Pierre Jackson 7	Pts: Montrezl Harrell 24; Rebs: Alan Williams 21; Asts: Pierriá Henry 4

Cox Pavilion, Paradise, Nevada
Referees: Marat Kogut, Brett Nansel, John Butler

NBA TV

4:30 pm

Boxscore

#21 Sacramento Kings 73, #19 Miami Heat 68 (OT)
Scoring by quarter: 9–27, 17–24, 27–4, 15–13, Overtime: 5–0
Pts: DeAndre Liggins 14; Rebs: Eric Moreland 10; Asts: Stone, Stockton 5 each	Pts: Josh Richardson 23; Rebs: Greg Whittington 10; Asts: Greg Whittington 4

Thomas & Mack Center, Paradise, Nevada
Referees: Dedric Taylor, Jason Goldenberg, Matthew Myers

NBA TV

6:00 pm

Boxscore

#18 Minnesota Timberwolves 73, #16 Cleveland Cavaliers 78
Scoring by quarter: 18–17, 21–12, 10–22, 24–27
Pts: Lorenzo Brown 19; Rebs: Adreian Payne 15; Asts: Tyus Jones 4	Pts: John Shurna 14; Rebs: Shurna, Pointer 6 each Asts: Cook, Pointer 3 each

Cox Pavilion, Paradise, Nevada
Referees: Justin VanDuyne, Mitchell Ervin, Phenizee Ransom

NBA TV

6:30 pm

Boxscore

#13 Utah Jazz 84, #11 Los Angeles Lakers 78
Scoring by quarter: 13–12, 23–21, 27–23, 21–22
Pts: Trey Lyles 20; Rebs: Trey Lyles 9 Asts: Olivier Hanlan 3	Pts: D'Angelo Russell 21; Rebs: Tarik Black 10; Asts: Jordan Clarkson 4

Thomas & Mack Center, Paradise, Nevada
Referees: JT Orr, Jacyn Goble, Sir Allen Conner

NBA TV

8:00 pm

Boxscore

#10 Brooklyn Nets 64, #6 NBA D-League Select 85
Scoring by quarter: 14–26, 15–23, 16–18, 19–18
Pts: Josh Gasser 19; Rebs: Akil Mitchell 11; Asts: Josh Gasser 5	Pts: Justin Dentmon 16; Rebs: Daniel Coursey 12; Asts: Justin Dentmon 4

Cox Pavilion, Paradise, Nevada
Referees: Nick Buchert, CJ Washington, Jaston Carter

NBA TV

8:30 pm

Boxscore

#24 Milwaukee Bucks 76, #5 New York Knicks 83
Scoring by quarter: 18–22, 18–12, 17–28, 23–21
Pts: Rashad Vaughn 20; Rebs: Micheal Eric 9 Asts: Jorge Gutierrez 5	Pts: Thanasis Antetokounmpo 17; Rebs: Ricky Ledo 7 Asts: Jerian Grant 6

Thomas & Mack Center, Paradise, Nevada
Referees: Tre Maddox, Josue Nieves, William Mensah

NBA TV

10:00 pm

Boxscore

#20 Washington Wizards 97, #3 Denver Nuggets 89
Scoring by quarter: 23–28, 15–22, 25–19, 34–20
Pts: Kelly Oubre Jr. 30; Rebs: Shawn Jones 13; Asts: Traevon Jackson 6	Pts: Oleksiy Pecherov 21; Rebs: Oleksiy Pecherov 8 Asts: Erick Green 10

Cox Pavilion, Paradise, Nevada
Referees: Tyler Ford, Gediminas Petraitis, AJ Desai

NBA TV

10:30 pm

Boxscore

#15 Portland Trail Blazers 72, #1 Toronto Raptors 64
Scoring by quarter: 25–24, 11–10, 17–22, 19–8
Pts: Andre Dawkins 24; Rebs: Malcolm Thomas 10; Asts: Tim Frazier 7	Pts: Caboclo, Kyser 12 each Rebs: Kyser, Nogueira, Scrubb 7 each Asts: Lucas Nogueira 3

Thomas & Mack Center, Paradise, Nevada
Referees: Scott Twardoski, Brandon Adair, Charles Watson

===== Quarterfinals (July 18) =====
NBA TV

4:00 pm

Boxscore

#7 San Antonio Spurs 95, #2 Boston Celtics 93
Scoring by quarter: 26–20, 18–25, 29–20, 22–28
Pts: Kyle Anderson 21; Rebs: Lalanne, Scott 7 each Asts: Graham, Lalanne, Scott 2 each	Pts: R.J. Hunter 21; Rebs: James Young 9 Asts: Terry Rozier 4

Thomas & Mack Center, Paradise, Nevada
Referees: Karl Lane, Vladimir Voyard-Tadal, Jacyn Goble

NBA TV

6:00 pm

Boxscore

#22 Dallas Mavericks 83, #14 Atlanta Hawks 91
Scoring by quarter: 26–25, 13–21, 20–22, 26–25
Pts: Justin Anderson 23; Rebs: Dwight Powell 9 Asts: Dwight Powell 5	Pts: Glenn Robinson III 20; Rebs: Mike Muscala 8 Asts: Lamar Patterson 5

Thomas & Mack Center, Paradise, Nevada
Referees: Lauren Holtkamp, Brett Nansel, JB DeRosa

NBA TV

8:00 pm

Boxscore

#17 Chicago Bulls 84, #8 Phoenix Suns 91
Scoring by quarter: 21–14, 18–21, 18–23, 26–32
Pts: Bobby Portis 25; Rebs: Bobby Portis 15; Asts: Ramon Galloway 6	Pts: T. J. Warren 31; Rebs: Goodwin, James, Warren 6 each Asts: Mike James 5

Thomas & Mack Center, Paradise, Nevada
Referees: Gediminas Petraitis, Mitchell Ervin, Josue Nieves

NBA TV

10:00 pm

Boxscore

#12 Golden State Warriors 91, #4 New Orleans Pelicans 100
Scoring by quarter: 24–16, 22–29, 18–23, 27–32
Pts: Dominique Sutton 23; Rebs: Kevon Looney 11; Asts: Craft, Stainbrook 4 each	Pts: Seth Curry 24; Rebs: Khem Birch 11; Asts: Larry Drew II 7

Thomas & Mack Center, Paradise, Nevada
Referees: Scott Twardoski, CJ Washington, Brandon Adair

===== Semifinals (July 19) =====
NBA TV

6:00 pm

Boxscore

#14 Atlanta Hawks 68, #7 San Antonio Spurs 75
Scoring by quarter: 23–11, 16–16, 12–28, 17–20
Pts: Lamar Patterson 16; Rebs: Mike Muscala 8 Asts: Tomás Bellas 4	Pts: Kyle Anderson 22; Rebs: Anderson, Simmons 8 each Asts: Davies, Simmons 2 each

Thomas & Mack Center, Paradise, Nevada
Referees: Eric Dalen, Nick Buchert, Jason Goldenberg

NBA TV

8:00 pm

Boxscore

#8 Phoenix Suns 93, #4 New Orleans Pelicans 87
Scoring by quarter: 15–26, 30–16, 24–28, 24–17
Pts: Devin Booker 31; Rebs: Booker, Harrellson 9 each Asts: Mike James 6	Pts: Bryce Dejean-Jones 25; Rebs: Khem Birch 10; Asts: Larry Drew II 8

Thomas & Mack Center, Paradise, Nevada
Referees: Tre Maddox, Karl Lane, Tyler Ford

===== Final (July 20) =====
NBA TV

9:00 pm

Boxscore

#8 Phoenix Suns 90, #7 San Antonio Spurs 93
Scoring by quarter: 23–17, 16–22, 20–26, 31–28
Pts: Mike James 32; Rebs: Alex Len 13; Asts: Mike James 4	Pts: Jonathon Simmons 23; Rebs: Brandon Davies 8 Asts: Anderson, Scott 4 each

Thomas & Mack Center, Paradise, Nevada
Referees: Nick Buchert, Tre Maddox, Lauren Holtkamp

=== Final standings ===
#	Team	GP	W	L	PCT	QP	Explanation
1	San Antonio Spurs	7	6	1	.857	16	Won championship game
2	Phoenix Suns	7	5	2	.714	17	Lost championship game
3	New Orleans Pelicans	6	5	1	.833	16.5	Lost in semifinals
4	Atlanta Hawks	7	4	3	.571	15.5	Lost in semifinals
5	Boston Celtics	5	4	1	.800	13	Lost in quarterfinals
6	Golden State Warriors	6	3	3	.500	13	Lost in quarterfinals
7	Chicago Bulls	6	3	3	.500	13	Lost in quarterfinals
8	Dallas Mavericks	6	2	4	.333	12	Lost in quarterfinals
9	New York Knicks	5	4	1	.800	9.5	Lost in second round
10	Toronto Raptors	5	3	2	.600	11.5	Lost in second round
11	NBA D-League Select	5	3	2	.600	11	Lost in second round
12	Denver Nuggets	5	3	2	.600	10.5	Lost in second round
13	Portland Trail Blazers	6	3	3	.500	12	Lost in second round
14	Brooklyn Nets	6	3	3	.500	10	Lost in second round
15	Washington Wizards	6	3	3	.500	8.5	Lost in second round
16	Milwaukee Bucks	6	1	5	.167	10	Lost in second round
17	Utah Jazz	5	2	3	.400	10.5	Lost in first round
18	Houston Rockets	5	2	3	.400	9.5	Lost in first round
19	Cleveland Cavaliers	5	2	3	.400	7	Lost in first round
20	Sacramento Kings	5	2	3	.400	7	Lost in first round
21	Los Angeles Lakers	5	1	4	.200	10	Lost in first round
22	Minnesota Timberwolves	5	1	4	.200	9	Lost in first round
23	Philadelphia 76ers	5	1	4	.200	8	Lost in first round
24	Miami Heat	5	1	4	.200	8	Lost in first round

=== Individual statistical leaders ===
Points

Player	Team	PPG
Seth Curry	New Orleans Pelicans	24.3
Zach LaVine	Minnesota Timberwolves	22.0
Kyle Anderson	San Antonio Spurs	21.0
Oleksiy Pecherov	Denver Nuggets	21.0
Alan Williams	Houston Rockets	20.5

Rebounds

Player	Team	RPG
Alan Williams	Houston Rockets	11.8
Lucas Nogueira	Toronto Raptors	10.6
Sim Bhullar	Sacramento Kings	10.0
Alex Len	Phoenix Suns	9.8
Jordan Mickey	Boston Celtics	9.6

Assists

Player	Team	APG
Larry Drew II	New Orleans Pelicans	7.8
Tim Frazier	Portland Trail Blazers	7.5
Jorge Gutierrez	Milwaukee Bucks	6.2
Emmanuel Mudiay	Denver Nuggets	5.8
Delon Wright	Toronto Raptors	5.5

=== Honors ===
The All-Summer League First and Second Teams were selected by a panel of media members in attendance at the Las Vegas NBA Summer League.

All-NBA Summer League First Team

- Kyle Anderson, San Antonio Spurs (MVP)
- Seth Curry, New Orleans Pelicans
- Doug McDermott, Chicago Bulls
- Norman Powell, Toronto Raptors
- T. J. Warren, Phoenix Suns

All-NBA Summer League Second Team

- Emmanuel Mudiay, Denver Nuggets
- Larry Drew II, New Orleans Pelicans
- Noah Vonleh, Portland Trail Blazers
- Dwight Powell, Dallas Mavericks
- Alan Williams, Houston Rockets

Championship Game MVP: Jonathon Simmons, San Antonio Spurs

== Summer League Rosters ==
*	Played in the Orlando Summer League
^	Played in the Utah Summer League
+	Played in the Las Vegas Summer League
	Did not play due to Injury/Became Injured during Summer League
	Signed with an NBA Team

=== Atlanta Hawks ===
Number	Player	Position	College/School/Club
16	Brandon Ashley+	F	Arizona
19	Tomás Bellas+	G	Gran Canaria
11	Josh Davis+	F	San Diego State
51	Jon Horford+	F	Florida
14	Stephen Holt+	G	Saint Mary's
20	DeAndre Kane+	G	Iowa State
2	Trey McKinney-Jones+	G	Miami (FL)
6	Abraham Millsap+	G	Tennessee State
41	Mike Moser+	F	Oregon
31	Mike Muscala+	F/C	Bucknell
13	Lamar Patterson+	G/F	Pittsburgh
33	Terran Petteway+	G/F	Nebraska
5	Glenn Robinson III+	G/F	Michigan
44	Greg Smith+	F	Fresno State
22	Walter Tavares+	C	Gran Canaria
29	Elston Turner Jr.+	G	Texas A&M

=== Boston Celtics ===
Number	Player	Position	College/School
60	Eric Buckner^+	F/C	Georgia State
49	C.J. Fair^+	F	Syracuse
68	Jonathan Holmes^+	F	Texas
63	Michael Holyfield+	C	Sam Houston State
28	R.J. Hunter^+	G	Georgia State
55	Jordan Mickey^+	F	LSU
48	Malcolm Miller^+	F	Holy Cross
47	Royce O'Neale^+	F	Baylor
26	Phil Pressey^+	G	Missouri
12	Terry Rozier^+	G	Louisville
36	Marcus Smart^+	G	Oklahoma State
27	Marcus Thornton^+	G	William & Mary
46	Corey Walden^+	G	Eastern Kentucky
13	James Young^+	G	Kentucky

=== Brooklyn Nets ===
Number	Player	Position	College/School/Club
18	Darius Adams*+	G	Indianapolis
34	Cliff Alexander*	F	Kansas
37	Khem Birch*	F	UNLV
31	Ryan Boatright*+	G	Connecticut
22	Markel Brown*+	G	Oklahoma State
55	Earl Clark*+	F	Louisville
29	Deshawn Delaney*+	G	New Mexico
26	Josh Gasser*+	G	Wisconsin
27	Steven Gray*	G	Gonzaga
16	Austin Hollins*+	G	Minnesota
24	Rondae Hollis-Jefferson*+	F	Arizona
21	Cory Jefferson*+	F	Baylor
57	Akil Mitchell*+	F	Virginia
20	JayVaughn Pinkston*+	F	Villanova
53	Juvonte Reddic*+	F	VCU
35	Willie Reed+	F/C	Saint Louis
17	Jonathon Simmons*	F	Houston
2	Xavier Thames*+	G	San Diego State
12	Juan Pablo Vaulet*+	F	Estudiantes
38	Ben Vozzola*+	G	Patriots

=== Charlotte Hornets ===
Number	Player	Position	College/School/Club
24	Justin Burrell*	F	St. John's
1	Justin Cobbs*	G	California
34	Aaron Craft*	G	Ohio State
30	Troy Daniels*	G	VCU
19	P. J. Hairston*	G	North Carolina
9	Aaron Harrison*	G	Kentucky
4	Frank Kaminsky*	F/C	Wisconsin
55	Kevin Murphy*	G	Tennessee Tech
41	Brian Qvale*	C	Montana
23	Keith Rendleman*	F	UNC Wilmington
10	LaQuinton Ross*	F	Ohio State
21	Ralston Turner*	G	NC State
20	Jonathan Wallace*	G	Georgetown
16	Alan Williams*	F/C	UC Santa Barbara

=== Chicago Bulls ===
Number	Player	Position	College/School/Club
2	Vander Blue+	G	Marquette
3	Doug McDermott+	F	Creighton
5	Bobby Portis+	F	Arkansas
6	Cristiano Felicio+	F/C	Flamengo
8	Diante Garrett+	G	Iowa State
14	Amere May+	G	Delaware State
15	Ramon Galloway+	G	La Salle
24	Rayvonte Rice+	G	Illinois
25	Tyrus McGee+	G	Iowa State
30	Darrell Williams+	F	Texas A&M–Commerce
41	Cameron Bairstow+	F	New Mexico
52	T. J. Price+	G	Western Kentucky

=== Cleveland Cavaliers ===
Number	Player	Position	College/School/Club
26	Jerrelle Benimon+	F	Towson
28	Rakeem Christmas+	F/C	Syracuse
14	Quinn Cook+	G	Duke
40	Eric Griffin+	F	Campbell
12	Joe Harris+	G	Virginia
35	Tyler Haws+	G	BYU
32	Trevor Lacey+	G	NC State
16	Sir'Dominic Pointer+	G/F	St. John's
10	D. J. Seeley+	G	Cal State Fullerton
24	John Shurna+	F	Northwestern
15	Keifer Sykes+	G	Green Bay
45	D. J. White+	F	Indiana
30	Talib Zanna+	F	Pittsburgh

=== Dallas Mavericks ===
Number	Player	Position	College/School/Club
13	Pablo Aguilar+	F	Valencia Basket
23	Justin Anderson+	G	Virginia
27	Jordan Crawford+	G	Xavier
20	Darius Miller+	F	Kentucky
4	Kevin Pangos+	G	Gonzaga
9	Bobby Ray Parks Jr.+	G	National University
8	Dwight Powell+	F/C	Stanford
52	Satnam Singh+	C	IMG Academy (HS)
33	Alex Stepheson+	C/F	USC
30	Jeremy Tyler+	C/F	San Diego (HS)
18	Maalik Wayns+	G	Villanova
10	Okaro White+	F	Florida State

=== Denver Nuggets ===
Number	Player	Position	College/School
5	Antonio Barton+	G	Memphis
30	Gilvydas Biruta+	F	Rhode Island
45	Ryan Broekhoff+	F	Valparaiso
12	Darius Carter+	F	Wichita State
20	Ian Clark+	G	Belmont
22	Jamaal Franklin+	G	San Diego State
11	Erick Green+	G	Virginia Tech
14	Gary Harris+	G	Michigan State
1	Nikola Jokić+	C	Mega Vizura / Leks
77	Joffrey Lauvergne+	F	Khimki
0	Emmanuel Mudiay+	G	Guangdong Southern Tigers
10	Alen Omić+	C	Union Olimpija
24	Roscoe Smith+	F	UNLV

=== Detroit Pistons ===
Number	Player	Position	College/School/Club
30	Manuel Atkins*	F	Georgia State
13	Kelsey Barlow*	G	UIC
12	Billy Baron*	G	Canisius
32	Jared Berggren*	F/C	Wisconsin
8	Spencer Dinwiddie*	G	Colorado
17	Sundiata Gaines*	G	Georgia
53	Kendall Gray*	C	Delaware State
33	Justin Harper*	F	Richmond
6	Darrun Hilliard*	G	Villanova
41	Kammeon Holsey*	F	Georgia Tech
3	Stanley Johnson*	F	Arizona
42	Adam Kemp*	F	Marist
34	Quincy Miller*	F	Baylor
55	Adonis Thomas*	F	Memphis
45	Julian Washburn*	F/G	UTEP
31	David Wear*	F	UCLA

=== Golden State Warriors ===
Number	Player	Position	College/School
4	Aaron Craft+	G	Ohio State
25	Johnny Dee+	G	San Diego
21	Michael Frazier II+	G	Florida
32	LaDontae Henton+	F	Providence
45	David Kravish+	F	California
1	Ognjen Kuzmic+	C	CB Axarquía (Spain)
22	Doron Lamb+	G	Kentucky
36	Kevon Looney+	F	UCLA
20	James Michael McAdoo+	F	North Carolina
44	Stefan Nastic+	C	Stanford
3	Aqeel Quinn+	G	San Diego State
15	Chasson Randle+	G	Stanford
55	Matt Stainbrook+	C	Xavier
33	Dominique Sutton+	F	North Carolina Central
8	Julian Washburn+	F	UTEP

=== Houston Rockets ===
Number	Player	Position	College/School/Club
46	J. J. Avila+	F	Colorado State
15	Clint Capela+	F	Élan Chalon
29	Aubrey Coleman+	G	Houston
14	Will Cummings+	G	Temple
7	Sam Dekker+	F	Wisconsin
35	Montrezl Harrell+	F	Louisville
28	Pierriá Henry+	G	Charlotte 49ers
26	Jaron Johnson+	G	Louisiana Tech
3	Nick Johnson+	G	Arizona
50	D. J. Kennedy+	F	St. John's
18	Denzel Livingston+	G	Incarnate Word
19	Glen Rice Jr.+	G	Georgia Tech
38	Chris Walker+	F	Florida
51	Alan Williams+	F/C	UC Santa Barbara
36	Christian Wood+	F	UNLV

=== Indiana Pacers ===
Number	Player	Position	College/School/Club
19	Jarell Eddie*	G	Virginia Tech
44	Solomon Hill*	F	Arizona
10	Mantas Kalnietis*	F	Lokomotiv Kuban Krasnodar
7	DaVonté Lacy*	G	Washington State
20	Trent Lockett*	G	Marquette
23	James Nunnally*	F	UC Santa Barbara
6	Jon Octeus*	G	Purdue
50	Arinze Onuaku*	C	Syracuse
24	Romero Osby*	F	Oklahoma
40	Matt Stainbrook*	C	Xavier
33	Myles Turner*	C	Texas
17	Christian Watford*	F	Indiana
42	Shayne Whittington*	F	Western Michigan
1	Joe Young*	G	Oregon

=== Los Angeles Clippers ===
Number	Player	Position	College/School/Club
22	Branden Dawson*	F	Michigan State
8	Diante Garrett*	G	Iowa State
21	Eric Griffin*	F	Campbell
1	Jordan Hamilton*	F	Texas
20	Geron Johnson*	G	Memphis
31	Haakim Johnson*	F	Pikeville
18	Amath M'Baye*	F	Oklahoma
19	Liam McMorrow*	C	Tennessee Tech
12	Yanick Moreira*	C	SMU
2	D. J. Newbill*	G	Penn State
42	Tim Parham*	F	Maryland Eastern Shore
33	Royce White*	F	Iowa State
30	C. J. Wilcox*	G	Washington
10	Nate Wolters*	G	South Dakota State
14	Patric Young*	C	Florida

=== Los Angeles Lakers ===
Number	Player	Position	College/School/Club
28	Tarik Black+	C	Kansas
3	Anthony Brown+	G/F	Stanford
15	Jabari Brown+	G	Missouri
20	Dwight Buycks+	G	Marquette
6	Jordan Clarkson+	G	Missouri
10	Will Davis II+	F	UC Irvine
9	Tony Mitchell+	F	North Texas
14	Xavier Munford+	G	Rhode Island
7	Larry Nance Jr.+	F	Wyoming
30	Julius Randle+	F	Kentucky
1	D'Angelo Russell+	G	Ohio State
12	Robert Upshaw+	C	Washington

=== Memphis Grizzlies ===
Number	Player	Position	College/School/Club
3	Jordan Adams*	G	UCLA
21	Josh Cameron*	G	Coastal Carolina
14	Raymond Cowels*	G	Santa Clara
6	Tony Crocker*	F/G	Oklahoma
0	JaMychal Green*	G/F	Alabama
4	Andrew Harrison*	G	Kentucky
20	Michael Holyfield*	C	Sam Houston State
53	Alex Kirk*	C	New Mexico
35	Darnell Lazare*	F	LSU
7	Rashad Madden*	G	Arkansas
23	Philip Scrubb*	G	Carleton
2	Rush Smith*	G	Louisville
1	Jarnell Stokes*	F/C	Tennessee
18	Josh Warren*	F	Troy
8	Okaro White*	F	Florida State

=== Miami Heat ===
Number	Player	Position	College/School/Club
50	Bradford Burgess*	F	VCU
12	Zoran Dragic*	G	Unicaja Málaga
32	James Ennis*+	F	Long Beach State
27	Kenny Gabriel*	F	Auburn
38	Juwan Howard Jr.*+	G	Detroit
8	Tyler Johnson*	G	Fresno State
25	Tyler Kalinoski*+	G	Davidson
26	Rodney McGruder*+	G	Kansas State
13	Shabazz Napier*+	G	Connecticut
34	Gabriel Olaseni*+	C	Iowa
35	Willie Reed*	F/C	Saint Louis
14	Josh Richardson*+	G	Tennessee
51	Joshua Smith*+	C	Georgetown
36	Travis Trice*+	G	Michigan State
29	Seth Tuttle*+	F	Northern Iowa
5	Henry Walker*+	F	Kansas State
21	Hassan Whiteside*	C	Marshall
28	Greg Whittington*+	F	Georgetown
20	Justise Winslow*+	F	Duke

=== Milwaukee Bucks ===
Number	Player	Position	College/Club
15	Cameron Clark+	F	Oklahoma
50	Michael Eric+	C	Temple
13	Jorge Gutiérrez+	G	California
17	Damien Inglis+	F	Chorale Roanne
6	Kevin Jones+	F	West Virginia
25	Sean Kilpatrick+	G	Cincinnati
18	Viacheslav Kravtsov+	C	Kyiv (Ukraine)
28	McKenzie Moore+	G	UTEP
77	Johnny O'Bryant III+	F	LSU
24	Jerome Randle+	G	California
23	Durand Scott+	G	Miami (Florida)
20	Rashad Vaughn+	G	UNLV

=== Minnesota Timberwolves ===
Number	Player	Position	College/School/Club
40	Ivan Aska+	F	Murray State
50	Kyle Barone+	F/C	Idaho
7	Lorenzo Brown+	G	NC State
0	Othyus Jeffers+	G	Robert Morris (Illinois)
1	Tyus Jones+	G	Duke
8	Zach LaVine+	G	UCLA
52	Jordan Morgan+	F	Michigan
33	Adreian Payne+	F/C	Michigan State
25	Tyler Stone+	F	Missouri
11	Sam Thompson+	F	Ohio State
32	Karl-Anthony Towns+	F/C	Kentucky
63	Nick Wiggins+	G	Wichita State
12	C.J. Williams+	G	NC State

=== New Orleans Pelicans ===
Number	Player	Position	College/School/Club
15	Jordan Aboudou+	F	BCM Gravelines
22	Khem Birch+	F	UNLV
12	Seth Curry+	G	Duke
31	Bryce Dejean-Jones+	G	UNLV
7	Larry Drew II+	G	UCLA
25	Fuquan Edwin+	F	Seton Hall
34	Drew Gordon+	F	New Mexico
6	He Tianju+	F	Liaoning Flying Leopards
24	Jay Hook+	G	Tulane
14	Lazeric Jones+	G	UCLA
2	Victor Rudd+	F	South Florida
4	Will Sheehey+	F	Indiana
32	Jarvis Varnado+	F/C	Mississippi State
18	Gasper Vidmar+	C	Darüşşafaka

=== New York Knicks ===
Number	Player	Position	College/School
43	Thanasis Antetokounmpo+	F	Filathlitikos
16	Jimmy Baron+	G	Rhode Island
9	T. J. Bray+	G	Princeton
17	Cleanthony Early+	F	Wichita State
44	Ovidijus Galdikas+	C	Asseco Gdynia
2	Langston Galloway+	G	Saint Joseph's
13	Jerian Grant+	G	Notre Dame
53	Alex Kirk+	C	New Mexico
5	Louis Labeyrie+	F/C	Paris-Levallois Basket
11	Ricky Ledo+	G	Providence
55	Maurice Ndour+	F	Ohio
46	Kristaps Porziņģis+	F/C	Baloncesto Sevilla
6	Travis Wear+	F	UCLA

=== Oklahoma City Thunder ===
Number	Player	Position	College/School/Club
23	Travis Bader*	G	Oakland
7	Semaj Christon*	G	Xavier
7	Michael Cobbins*	F	Oklahoma State
11	Quinn Cook*	G	Duke
26	Tekele Cotton*	G	Wichita State
18	Maxie Esho*	F	UMass
30	Frank Gaines*	G	IPFW
44	Dakari Johnson*	C	Kentucky
16	Kevin Jones*	F	West Virginia
33	Mitch McGary*	F	Michigan
31	Levi Randolph*	G	Alabama
15	Richard Solomon*	F/C	California
40	James Southerland*	F	Syracuse
25	Marquis Teague*	G	Kentucky
42	Talib Zanna*	F/C	Pittsburgh

=== Orlando Blue ===
Number	Player	Position	College/School/Club
45	Ryan Broekhoff*	F	Valparaiso
30	Daniel Coursey*	C	Mercer
16	Drew Crawford*	G	Northwestern
20	Brandon Davies*	F	BYU
50	Nnanna Egwu*	C	Illinois
00	Aaron Gordon*	F	Arizona
1	Tyler Harvey*	G	Eastern Washington
23	Mario Hezonja*	G/F	Barcelona
11	Roy Devyn Marble*	G	Iowa
52	Jordan Morgan*	F	Michigan
4	Elfrid Payton*	G	Louisiana–Lafayette
36	Jordan Sibert*	G	Dayton
17	Peyton Siva*	G	Louisville
54	TaShawn Thomas*	F	Oklahoma
55	Jabril Trawick*	F	Georgetown
35	Maurice Walker*	G	Minnesota

=== Orlando White ===
Number	Player	Position	College/School/Club
6	Keith Appling*	G	Michigan State
43	Jordan Bachynski*	C	Arizona State
25	Keith Benson*	C	Oakland
22	John Bohannon*	F	UTEP
24	Taylor Braun*	G	North Dakota State
14	Jahii Carson*	G	Arizona State
19	Melvin Ejim*	F	Iowa State
31	Antoine Mason*	G	Auburn
53	Youssou Ndoye*	C	St. Bonaventure
28	Glen Rice Jr.*	F	Georgia Tech
33	Chris Singleton*	F	Florida State
32	Lenzelle Smith Jr.*	G	Ohio State
26	Dondray Walker*	G	Newberry
15	Scottie Wilbekin*	G	Florida
37	Jarvis Williams*	F	Murray State

=== Philadelphia 76ers ===
Number	Player	Position	College/School/Club
19	Furkan Aldemir^	F/C	Galatasaray Liv Hospital
27	Askia Booker+	G	Colorado
18	Deonte Burton^	G	Nevada
39	Jerami Grant^	F	Syracuse
43	K. T. Harrell+	G	Auburn
30	Corey Hawkins^	G	UC Davis
17	Richaun Holmes^	F	Bowling Green
50	Vince Hunter+	F	UTEP
51	Charles Jackson+	C	Tennessee Tech
55	Pierre Jackson+	G	Baylor
45	Jamal Jones+	F	Texas A&M
14	Arsalan Kazemi+	F	Oregon
40	Chavaughn Lewis^	F/G	Marist
17	T. J. McConnell^+	G	Arizona
52	Jordan McRae+	G/F	Tennessee
8	Jahlil Okafor^+	C	Duke
9	JaKarr Sampson+	G/F	St. John's
18	J. P. Tokoto^+	G/F	North Carolina
11	Scottie Wilbekin+	G/F	Florida
54	Stephen Zack+	C	La Salle

=== Phoenix Suns ===
Number	Player	Position	College
1	Devin Booker+	G	Kentucky
10	Alec Brown+	F/C	Wisconsin–Green Bay
4	Justin Carter+	G	Creighton
20	Archie Goodwin+	G	Kentucky
81	Luke Harangody+	F	Notre Dame
32	Justin Harper+	F	Richmond
55	Josh Harrellson+	C/F	Kentucky
16	Mike James+	G	Lamar
21	Alex Len+	C	Maryland
31	Mickey McConnell+	G	Saint Mary's
8	Jerel McNeal+	G	Marquette
12	T. J. Warren+	F	North Carolina State

=== Portland Trail Blazers ===
Number	Player	Position	College/School/Club
34	Arnett Moultrie+	F	Mississippi State
60	Keith Bogans+	G/F	Kentucky
6	Kenny Chery+	G	Baylor
16	Karl Cochran+	G	Wofford
5	Pat Connaughton+	G	Notre Dame
23	Allen Crabbe+	G	California
29	Andre Dawkins+	G	Duke
40	Stephen Dennis+	G	Kutztown
10	Tim Frazier+	G	Penn State
8	Ra'Shad James+	G	Northwood
17	Marko Kešelj+	F	Mega Vizura / Leks
11	Meyers Leonard+	C	Illinois
44	Luis David Montero+	G	Westchester CC
18	Daniel Orton+	C/F	Kentucky
26	Malcolm Thomas+	F	San Diego State
21	Noah Vonleh+	F	Indiana

=== Sacramento Kings ===
Number	Player	Position	College/School/Club
19	James Anderson+	G	Oklahoma State
32	Sim Bhullar+	C	New Mexico State
00	Willie Cauley-Stein+	C	Kentucky
26	Duje Dukan+	F	Wisconsin
33	Corey Hawkins+	G	UC Davis
55	Ian Hummer+	F	Princeton
35	C. J. Leslie+	F	NC State
41	DeAndre Liggins+	G	Kentucky
40	Shaquielle McKissic+	F	Arizona State
25	Eric Moreland+	F/C	Oregon State
42	Alex Oriakhi+	F	Connecticut
5	Juwan Staten+	G	West Virginia
9	David Stockton+	G	Gonzaga
77	Julyan Stone+	G	UTEP
31	David Wear+	F	UCLA

=== San Antonio Spurs ===
Number	Player	Position	College/School/Club
1	Kyle Anderson^+	G/F	UCLA
55	Darion Atkins^+	F/C	Virginia
45	Dairis Bertāns^+	G	Bilbao Basket
25	Wayne Blackshear^+	F	Louisville
56	Will Cherry^+	G	Montana
0	Brandon Davies+	F	BYU
24	Marcus Denmon^+	G	Missouri
42	Treveon Graham^+	G/F	VCU
28	Livio Jean-Charles^+	F	ASVEL Basket
19	Jarell Eddie+	G	Virginia Tech
26	Cady Lalanne^+	C	UMass
18	Ryan Manuel^+	G/F	SMU Mustangs
48	Stefan Nastić^+	C	Stanford
35	Youssou Ndoye+	C	St. Bonaventure
30	Shannon Scott^+	G	Ohio State
16	Jonathon Simmons+	F	Houston
41	Roscoe Smith^	F	UNLV
36	Nate Wolters+	G	South Dakota State
17	Casper Ware^	G	Long Beach State

=== Toronto Raptors ===
Number	Player	Position	College/School/Club
30	Dallin Bachynski+	C	Utah
13	Jordan Bachynski+	C	Arizona State
5	Bruno Caboclo+	F	Esporte Clube Pinheiros
1	Drew Crawford+	G	Northwestern
22	DeAndre Daniels+	F	Connecticut
35	Phil Greene IV+	G	St. John's
9	Michale Kyser+	F	Louisiana Tech
92	Lucas Nogueira+	C	Estudiantes
4	Norman Powell+	G	UCLA
14	Ronald Roberts+	F	Saint Joseph's
11	Philip Scrubb+	G	Carleton
6	Gary Talton+	G	UIC
16	Axel Toupane+	G/F	Strasbourg IG
20	Mitchell Watt+	F/C	Buffalo
55	Delon Wright+	G	Utah

=== Utah Jazz ===
Number	Player	Position	College/School/Club
45	Jack Cooley^+	F	Notre Dame
8	Bryce Cotton^+	G	Providence
74	Jared Cunningham^+	G	Oregon State
77	Jerry Evans^	F	Nevada
11	Dante Exum^+	G	Australian Institute of Sport
21	Olivier Hanlan^+	G	Boston College
5	Rodney Hood^+	G/F	Duke
17	Grant Jerrett^+	F	Arizona
23	Chris Johnson^+	F	Dayton
81	JaJuan Johnson^+	F	Purdue
41	Trey Lyles^+	F	Kentucky
72	Jesse Morgan^+	G	UMass Minutemen
80	Brock Motum^+	F	Washington State
82	J.J. O'Brien^+	F	San Diego State
31	Levi Randolph+	G	Alabama
71	Nick Russell^	G	SMU
73	Wesley Saunders^+	G/F	Harvard
63	Nick Wiggins^	G	Wichita State

=== Washington Wizards ===
Number	Player	Position	College/School/Club
36	Jarrid Famous+	C	South Florida
50	Traevon Jackson+	G	Wisconsin
6	Damion James+	F	Texas
33	Orlando Johnson+	G	UC Santa Barbara
55	Shawn Jones+	F	Middle Tennessee
14	Scott Machado+	G	Iona
1	Toure' Murry+	G	Wichita State
12	Kelly Oubre Jr.+	F/G	Kansas
54	Jaleel Roberts+	C	UNC Asheville
43	LaQuinton Ross+	F	Ohio State
15	Scott Suggs+	G	Washington
44	Dez Wells+	G/F	Maryland
30	Aaron White+	F	Iowa
21	Jamil Wilson+	F	Marquette
