= DeQuan Jones =

American basketball player (born 1990)

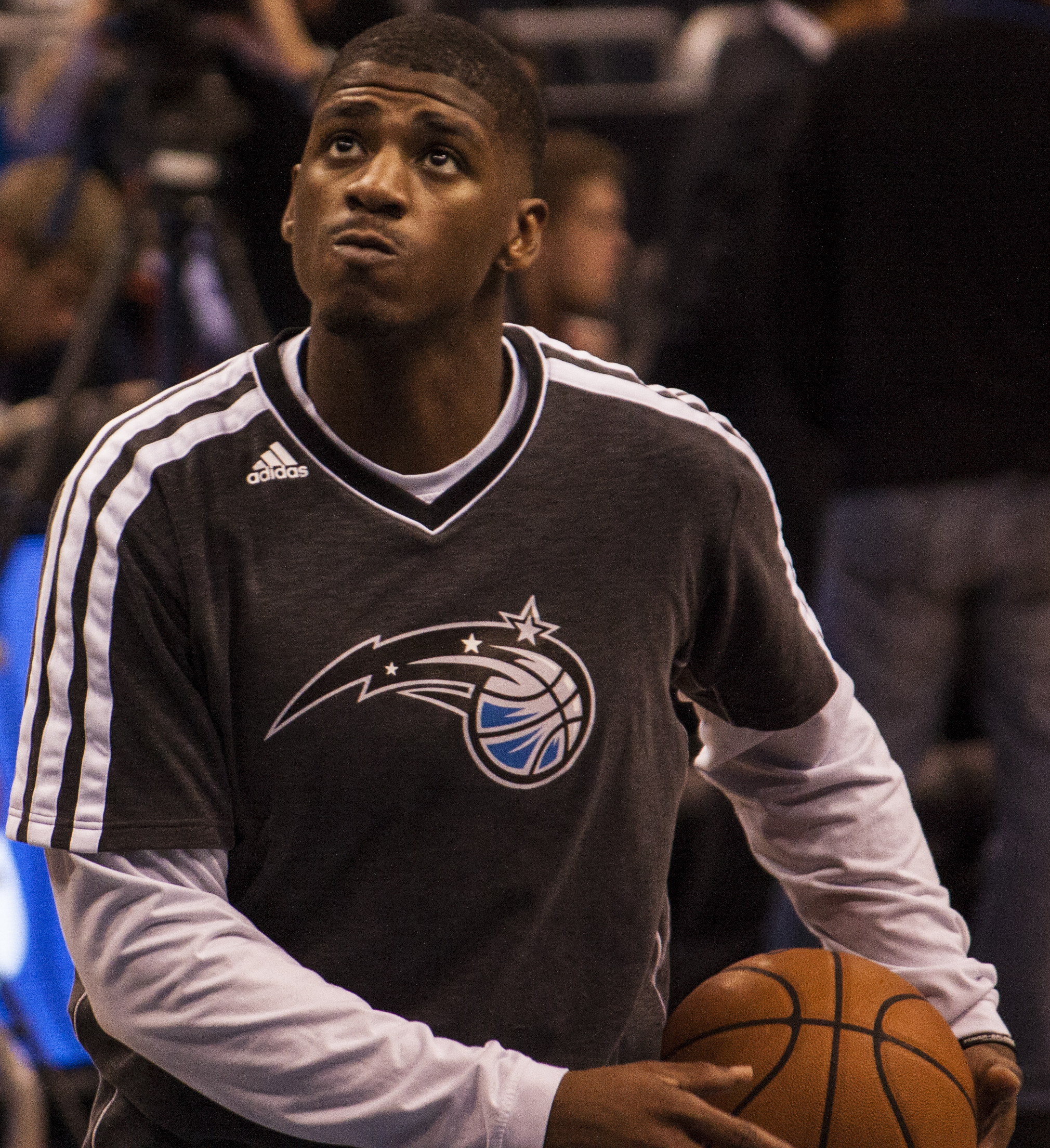
- Jones with the Orlando Magic in 2012

Free agent
- Position: Small forward

Personal information
- Born: June 20, 1990 (age 36) Stone Mountain, Georgia, U.S.
- Listed height: 6 ft 8 in (2.03 m)
- Listed weight: 220 lb (100 kg)

Career information
- High school: Wheeler (Marietta, Georgia)
- College: Miami (Florida) (2008–2012)
- NBA draft: 2012: undrafted
- Playing career: 2012–present

Career history
- 2012–2013: Orlando Magic
- 2013–2014: Reno Bighorns
- 2014–2015: Pallacanestro Cantù
- 2015–2016: Chiba Jets
- 2016–2017: Lille Métropole
- 2017–2018: Fort Wayne Mad Ants
- 2018: Anhui Dragons
- 2018–2019: Hapoel Holon
- 2019–2020: Pallacanestro Trieste
- 2020–2023: Nishinomiya Storks
- 2023: →Shiga Lakes
- 2024: NLEX Road Warriors
- 2025: Al-Qadsia SC
- 2026: NLEX Road Warriors

Career highlights
- NBA G League Most Improved Player (2018); NBA G League Slam Dunk Contest champion (2018); Lega Basket Serie A All-Star (2015); Fourth-team Parade All-American (2008)
- Stats at NBA.com
- Stats at Basketball Reference

DeQuan Jones (born June 20, 1990) is an American professional basketball player for the NLEX Road Warriors of the Philippine Basketball Association (PBA). He played college basketball for the University of Miami.

== High school career ==
Jones attended Joseph Wheeler High School in Marietta, Georgia. He averaged 15.2 points, 6.7 rebounds and 4.0 blocks per game as a senior en route to Class 5-A Player of the Year honors by the Atlanta Journal-Constitution and Northwest Player of the Year accolades. He helped Wildcats finish 30–3 with a No. 18 national ranking by USA Today; they advanced to the state title game, where the Wildcats lost by just three points.

== College career ==
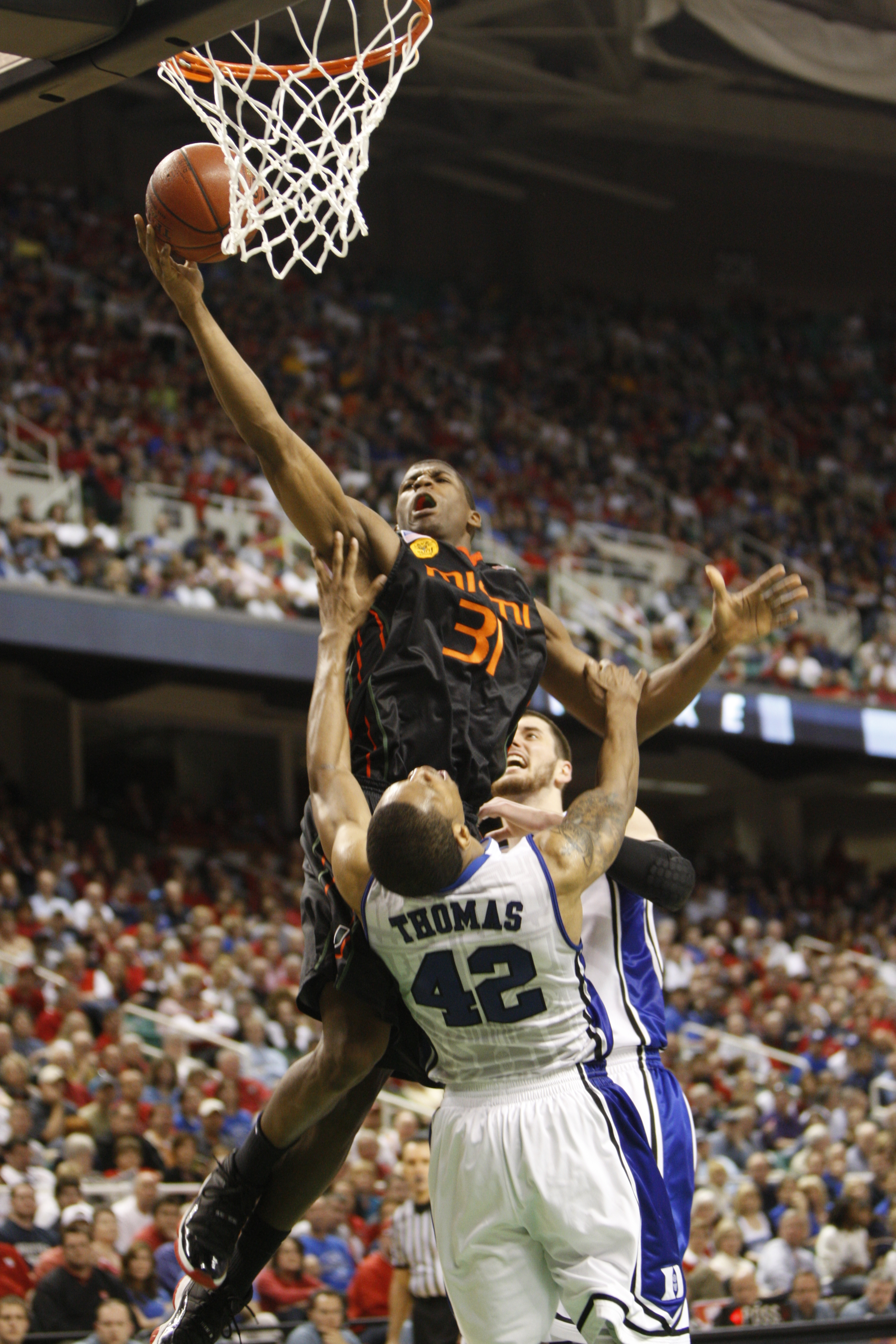
Jones with the University of Miami, 2010

In his four-year Hurricane career, Jones appeared in 111 games and started in 35, recording 508 points, 268 rebounds, 53 assists, 52 steals and 51 blocks. On November 25, 2009, he recorded a career high 16 points against Florida Gulf Coast.

On December 20, 2011, Jones received approval to return to competition after he sat out the season's first 10 games because of an NCAA investigation into recruiting allegations. On March 29, 2012, he participated in the 24th Annual State Farm College Slam Dunk and Three-Point Contest at the Final Four.

== Professional career ==
=== Orlando Magic (2012–2013) ===
After going undrafted in the 2012 NBA draft, Jones joined the Orlando Magic for the 2012 NBA Summer League. On September 29, 2012, he signed with the Magic. On March 27, 2013, he scored a season-high 13 points on 6-of-9 shooting in a 108–114 loss to the Charlotte Bobcats.

In July 2013, Jones re-joined the Orlando Magic for the 2013 NBA Summer League. On September 29, 2013, he signed with the Sacramento Kings. However, he was later waived by the Kings on October 15, 2013, after appearing in one preseason game.

=== Reno Bighorns (2013–2014) ===
In November 2013, he was acquired by the Reno Bighorns of the NBA Development League as an affiliate player.

=== Pallacanestro Cantù (2014–2015) ===
In July 2014, Jones joined the Indiana Pacers for the Orlando Summer League and the New Orleans Pelicans for the Las Vegas Summer League. On July 27, he signed a one-year deal with Pallacanestro Cantù of the Lega Basket Serie A. On January 8, 2015, he was named a participant in the 2015 Serie A All-Star Weekend Slam Dunk Contest. He was also named to the "Named Sport Team" for the BEKO All-Star Game held on January 17, going on to score 26 points to help Named Sport defeat the "Dolomiti Energia Team", 146–143. In 35 league games for Cantù in 2014–15, he averaged 8.2 points and 3.3 rebounds per game. He also averaged 8.2 points and 4.3 rebounds in 17 Eurocup games.

=== Chiba Jets Funabashi (2015–2016) ===
On September 25, 2015, Jones signed with the Atlanta Hawks. However, he was later waived by the Hawks on October 24 after appearing in four preseason games. On November 29, he signed with the Chiba Jets of the Japanese NBL.

=== Lille Métropole (2016–2017) ===
On September 15, 2016, Jones was included in the roster of Lille Métropole of the LNB Pro B.

=== Fort Wayne Mad Ants (2017–2018) ===
On September 7, 2017, Jones signed with the Indiana Pacers of the NBA, on a training camp deal. He was waived on October 14 as one of the team's final preseason roster cuts. He played the season with the Pacers' NBA G League affiliate, the Fort Wayne Mad Ants and won the G Leagues' Most Improved Player award.

=== Anhui Dragons (2018) ===
On May 5, 2018, Jones signed with Anhui Dragons of the Chinese NBL.

=== Hapoel Holon (2018–2019) ===
On July 31, 2018, Jones joined the Israeli team Hapoel Holon, signing a one-year deal with an option for another one. On October 20, 2018, Jones recorded a season-high 29 point, shooting 11-of-15 from the field, along with four rebounds and two blocks in a 108–102 overtime win over Hapoel Eilat. In 52 games played during the 2018–19 season, he averaged 12.4 points, 3.3 rebounds and 1.1 assists per game, shooting 40.1 percent from three-point range.

=== Pallacanestro Trieste (2019–2020) ===
On August 12, 2019, Jones returned to Italy for a second stint, signing with Pallacanestro Trieste for the 2019–20 season.

=== Nishinomiya Storks (2020–2023) ===
On July 31, 2020, Jones signed in Japan for the Nishinomiya Storks. On January 31, 2023, he joined the Shiga Lakes on loan.

=== NLEX Road Warriors (2024, 2026) ===
On September 11, 2024, Jones signed with the NLEX Road Warriors of the Philippine Basketball Association to replace Myke Henry as the team's import for the 2024 PBA Governors' Cup.

On June 16, 2026, Jones returned to NLEX as its import for the 2026 PBA Governors' Cup.

== Career statistics ==
Legend
GP	Games played	GS	Games started	MPG	Minutes per game
FG%	Field goal percentage	3P%	3-point field goal percentage	FT%	Free throw percentage
RPG	Rebounds per game	APG	Assists per game	SPG	Steals per game
BPG	Blocks per game	PPG	Points per game	**Bold**	Career high

=== NBA ===
==== Regular season ====
Year	Team	GP	GS	MPG	FG%	3P%	FT%	RPG	APG	SPG	BPG	PPG
2012–13	Orlando	63	17	12.7	.436	.257	.667	1.7	.3	.3	.3	3.7
Career		63	17	12.7	.436	.257	.667	1.7	.3	.3	.3	3.7

=== College ===
Year	Team	GP	GS	MPG	FG%	3P%	FT%	RPG	APG	SPG	BPG	PPG
2008–09	Miami	32	3	11.0	.337	.077	.633	1.7	.5	.3	.4	2.7
2009–10	Miami	28	20	16.6	.533	.231	.667	2.5	.5	.5	.6	5.7
2010–11	Miami	28	10	13.9	.419	.083	.611	2.5	.5	.5	.4	4.5
2011–12	Miami	23	2	17.3	.451	.250	.620	3.6	.4	.6	.5	5.9

== Personal ==
Jones is the son of Irene Bell and Clady Jones, and has a brother, Camron.
