= Hong Kong Bulls =

- Leagues: National Basketball League
- Founded: 6 June 2023
- Arena: Southorn Stadium
- Location: Wan Chai, Hong Kong
- Head coach: Libin Xie
- Championships: NBL: 3 (2024, 2025, 2025–26)
- Website: Official website

The Hong Kong Bulls (Chinese: 香港金牛) are a professional basketball team that plays in the Chinese National Basketball League, the second tier of Chinese basketball. They were formed in June 2023.

== History ==
On June 6, 2023 the Hong Kong Bulls were established, with Tie Liu being the coach for the team. On June 14, they entered the National Basketball League as an expansion team, and released its 18-men roster.

The Bulls finished their inaugural season in 8th, with 9 wins and 13 losses. They qualified for the playoffs, but they were defeated by Anhui Wenyi in the first round and eliminated from the competition.

In their second season, the Hong Kong Bulls finished in second place with 22 wins and 4 losses. In the playoffs, they faced off against Jiangxi Ganchi, winning the series 2-0 and advanced to the semi-finals, where they recorded a 3-1 victory in the series against Changsha Wantian Yongsheng. In the finals, the team recorded a 4-1 victory in the series against Anhui Wenyi to secure the team's first championship in history.

Having 19 wins and 1 loss, the Bulls finished the 2025 regular season in first place. In the playoffs, the Bulls won 3–0 in the series against Shijiazhuang Xianglan, advancing to the finals, when they defeated Changsha Yongsheng 3–1 in the series and defended the trophy.

== Season-by-season record ==
Season	League	Regular season					Playoffs
Season	League	Rank	GP	W	L	PCT	Playoffs
2023	NBL	8 / 12	22	9	13	.409	Lost First round (Anhui Wenyi) 0–2
2024	NBL	2 / 10	26	22	4	.846	Won First round (Jiangxi Ganchi) 2–0; Won Semi-finals (Changsha Wantian Yongsheng) 3–1; Won Finals (Anhui Wenyi) 4–1
2025	NBL	1 / 8	20	19	1	.950	Won Semi-finals (Shijiazhuang Xianglan) 3–0; Won Finals (Changsha Yongsheng) 3–1
2025–26	NBL	1 / 14	26	23	3	.885	Won First round (Suke Lions) 2–0; Won Semi-finals (Jiangxi Ganchi) 3–0; Won Finals (Shanghai Blackbird) 3–0

== List of coaches ==
Term	Coach	Notes
15 Jun 2023 – 22 Nov 2023	(China) Tie Liu	
1 Dec 2023 –	(China) Libin Xie	
