= Dakari Johnson =

American basketball player (born 1995)

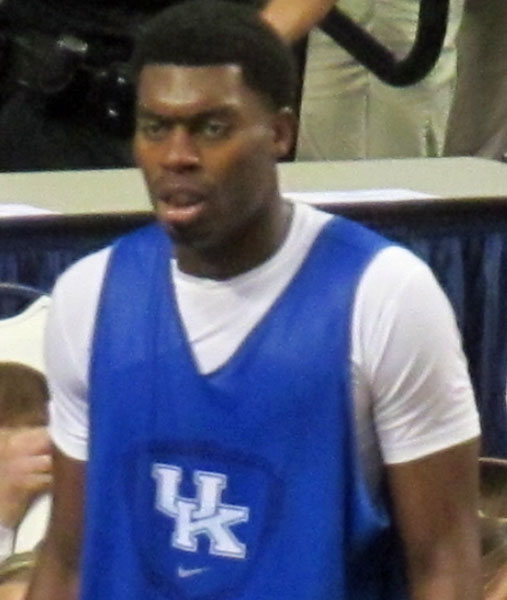
- Johnson in Kentucky's Blue-White scrimmage in 2013

No. 41 – Zhejiang Golden Bulls
- Position: Center
- League: CBA

Personal information
- Born: September 22, 1995 (age 31) Brooklyn, New York, U.S
- Listed height: 7 ft 0 in (2.13 m)
- Listed weight: 255 lb (116 kg)

Career information
- High school: St. Patrick (Elizabeth, New Jersey); Montverde Academy (Montverde, Florida)
- College: Kentucky (2013–2015)
- NBA draft: 2015: 2nd round, 48th overall pick
- Drafted by: Oklahoma City Thunder
- Playing career: 2015–present

Career history
- 2015–2017: Oklahoma City Blue
- 2017–2018: Oklahoma City Thunder
- 2018–2022: Qingdao Eagles
- 2019: Anhui Wenyi
- 2023: Anhui Wenyi
- 2023–2024: Qingdao Eagles
- 2024: Anhui Wenyi
- 2025: Changsha Yongsheng
- 2025–present: Zhejiang Golden Bulls

Career highlights
- 2x NBL champion (2019, 2023); NBL Finals MVP (2019); CBA All Import Player First Team (2021, 2026); CBA All-Star (2019); NBL rebound leader (2025); NBL block leader (2025); All-NBA D-League First Team (2017); NBA D-League All-Star (2017); NBA D-League All-Rookie Team (2016); McDonald's All-American (2013)
- Stats at NBA.com
- Stats at Basketball Reference
Medals
Men's basketball
Representing the United States
FIBA World U17 Championship
Gold medal – first place	2012 Lithuania	National team

Dakari Naeem Johnson (born September 22, 1995) is an American professional basketball player for the Zhejiang Golden Bulls of the Chinese Basketball Association (CBA). He played college basketball for the University of Kentucky.

== High school career ==
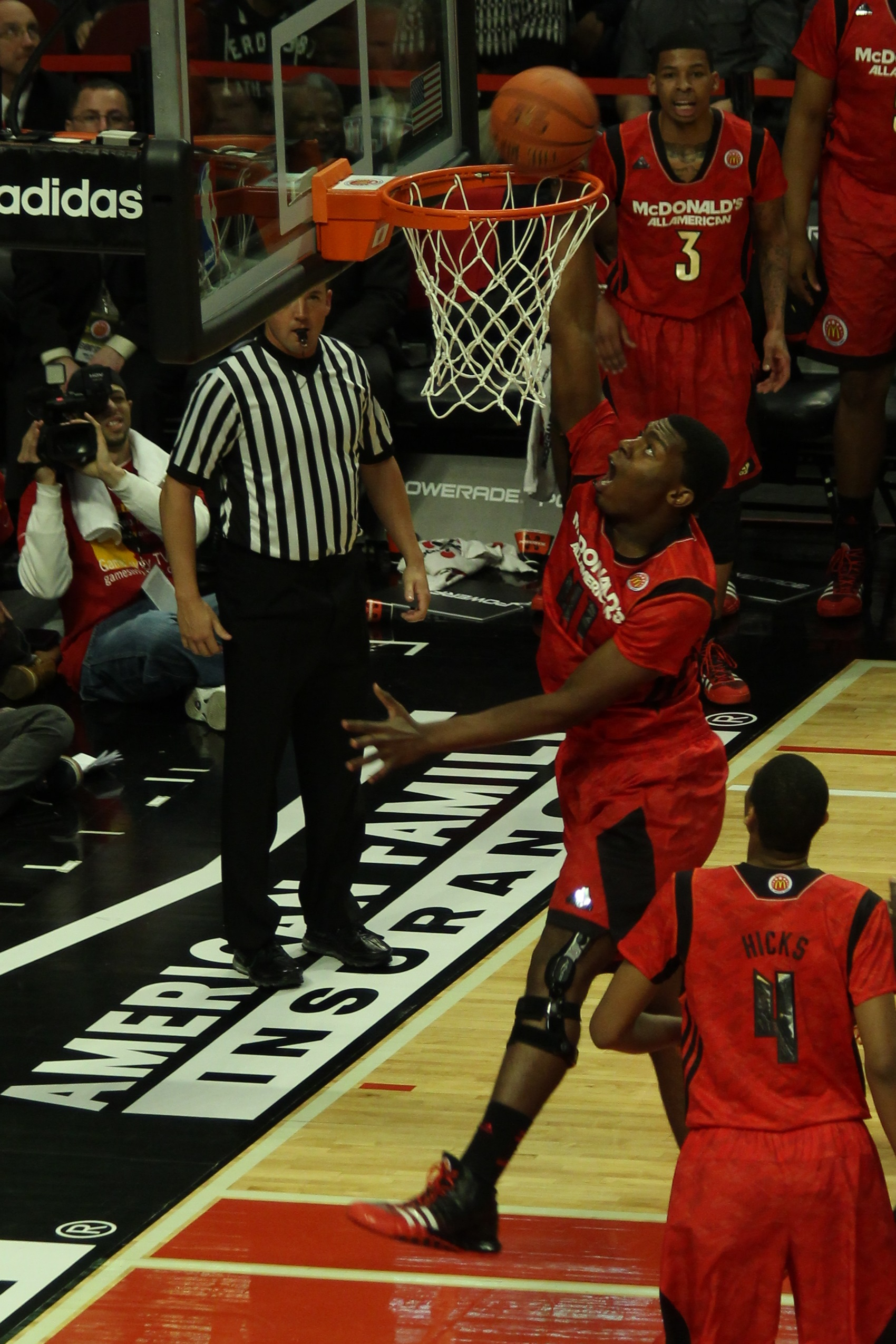
Johnson at the 2013 McDonald's All-American Boys Game

Johnson first attended St. Patrick High School in Elizabeth, New Jersey. After the 2010–11 school year, when coach Kevin Boyle left for Montverde Academy, Johnson followed his coach, where he had to sit out the 2011–12 season due to the transfer. Because of his excellent grades, Johnson decided to reclassify, thus making the 2012–13 season his final and senior season at the high school level. He ended up averaging 17.0 points, 11.0 rebounds and 4.3 blocks per game as a senior. His senior year he garnered USA Today All-American Second-Team for his success. He subsequently earned selection to the 2013 McDonald's All-American Boys Game and Jordan Brand Classic.

Considered a five-star recruit by ESPN.com, Johnson was ranked as the No. 2 center in the nation in 2013.

College recruiting
Name	Hometown	School	Height	Weight	Commit date
Dakari Johnson; C	Brooklyn, NY	Montverde Academy	6 ft 10 in (2.08 m)	250 lb (110 kg)	Jan 5, 2013
Dakari Johnson; C	Recruit ratings: Scout: Rivals: 247Sports: ESPN: (95)				
Overall recruit ranking: Scout: 10 Rivals: 9 ESPN: 7
Note: In many cases, Scout, Rivals, 247Sports, On3, and ESPN may conflict in their listings of height and weight.; In these cases, the average was taken. ESPN grades are on a 100-point scale.; Sources:

== College career ==
As a freshman at Kentucky in 2013–14, Johnson spent the season backing up teammate Julius Randle and averaged 5.2 points and 3.9 rebounds in 39 games. As a sophomore the following season, he again played back-up, this time to freshman big man Karl-Anthony Towns and junior Willie Cauley-Stein. He again appeared in 39 games in 2014–15 and averaged slightly higher numbers with 6.4 points and 4.6 rebounds per game.

On April 9, 2015, Johnson declared for the NBA draft, forgoing his final two years of college eligibility. He was joined alongside fellow Kentucky teammates in Aaron Harrison, Andrew Harrison, Karl-Anthony Towns, Willie Cauley-Stein, Trey Lyles and Devin Booker.

== Professional career ==
=== Oklahoma City Blue (2015–2017) ===
On June 25, 2015, Johnson was selected by the Oklahoma City Thunder with the 48th overall pick in the 2015 NBA draft. He later joined the Thunder for the 2015 NBA Summer League where he averaged 7.6 points and 8.6 rebounds in five games. On November 3, 2015, he was acquired by the Oklahoma City Blue of the NBA Development League, the affiliate team of the Thunder. On November 14, he made his professional debut in a 110–104 loss to the Austin Spurs, recording 16 points, nine rebounds, one assist, one steal and one block in 33 minutes. Johnson appeared in all 50 games for the Blue in 2015–16, averaging 12.3 points, 8.1 rebounds, 2.0 assists and 1.6 blocks per game. He subsequently earned NBA D-League All-Rookie Team honors.

Johnson returned to the Blue for the 2016–17 season, and on February 6, 2017, he was named in the Western Conference All-Star team for the 2017 NBA D-League All-Star Game.

=== Oklahoma City Thunder (2017–2018) ===
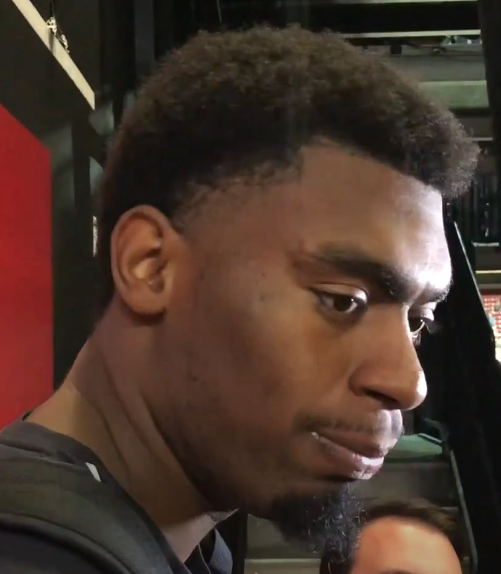
Johnson at the 2018 NBA Summer League.

On July 22, 2017, Johnson signed with the Oklahoma City Thunder. He scored four points in his NBA debut on October 19, 2017, in the Thunder's 105–84 win over the New York Knicks. During his only season with the Oklahoma City Thunder, he started six games for the team where he replaced Steven Adams. As the starting center for the team they went 5–1 in those games. Johnson was a plus-26 in point differential in those six games, including a plus-26 in rout to a victory against the Los Angeles Clippers when Johnson held his own against DeAndre Jordan. Johnson's averages for those six games were 15 minutes, 5.2 points, 2.2 rebounds, 0.3 turnovers, 64.7 percent shooting and 60 percent foul shooting.

On July 20, 2018, Johnson was traded to the Orlando Magic in exchange for Rodney Purvis. Cash considerations were also sent to the Magic. On July 23, 2018, Johnson and the draft rights to Tyler Harvey were traded to the Memphis Grizzlies in exchange for Jarell Martin and cash considerations. On August 31, 2018, Johnson was waived by the Memphis Grizzlies.

=== Qingdao Eagles (2018–2019) ===
On September 11, 2018, Johnson was reported to have signed with Qingdao DoubleStar Eagles of the Chinese Basketball Association (CBA).

=== Anuyi Wenyi (2019) ===
On August 23, 2019, Johnson was reported to have played for Anhui Wenyi of the National Basketball League (NBL) and returned with a championship and most valuable player honors.

=== Return to the Eagles (2019–2022) ===
In the 2019–20 season, Johnson averaged 23.7 points, 14.5 rebounds, 3.0 assists and 1.6 blocks per game.

On September 9, 2020, Johnson re-signed with Qingdao.

== NBA career statistics ==
Legend
GP	Games played	GS	Games started	MPG	Minutes per game
FG%	Field goal percentage	3P%	3-point field goal percentage	FT%	Free throw percentage
RPG	Rebounds per game	APG	Assists per game	SPG	Steals per game
BPG	Blocks per game	PPG	Points per game	**Bold**	Career high

=== Regular season ===
Year	Team	GP	GS	MPG	FG%	3P%	FT%	RPG	APG	SPG	BPG	PPG
2017–18	Oklahoma City	31	6	5.2	.564	–	.550	1.1	.3	.2	.3	1.8
Career		31	6	5.2	.564	–	.550	1.1	.3	.2	.3	1.8

=== Playoffs ===
Year	Team	GP	GS	MPG	FG%	3P%	FT%	RPG	APG	SPG	BPG	PPG
2018	Oklahoma City	2	0	1.6	.000	.000	.000	.0	.0	.0	.0	.0
Career		2	0	1.6	.000	.000	.000	.0	.0	.0	.0	.0

== Personal life ==
Dakari comes from a basketball family in Brooklyn, New York, where he is a third-generation basketball player. His family's basketball legacy started with his grandfather Leslie R. Campbell, best known as Jitu Weusi, who played college basketball at Long Island University. His mother Makini Campbell also played at Long Island University, and his uncle Kojo Campbell played basketball at Stony Brook University. His brother Kamani Johnson played basketball at Arkansas-Little Rock before transferring to Arkansas. His cousin Michael Murray played college basketball at Coppin State University, where he was selected all-MEAC his senior year. Most recently, Michael played professionally in Spain.

Dakari is married to his long-term girlfriend Mercedes Johnson from Las Vegas, Nevada, who has been by his side since 2015. The couple got engaged in 2020 and have two children together.
