= Chris Singleton (basketball, born 1989) =

American basketball player (born 1989)

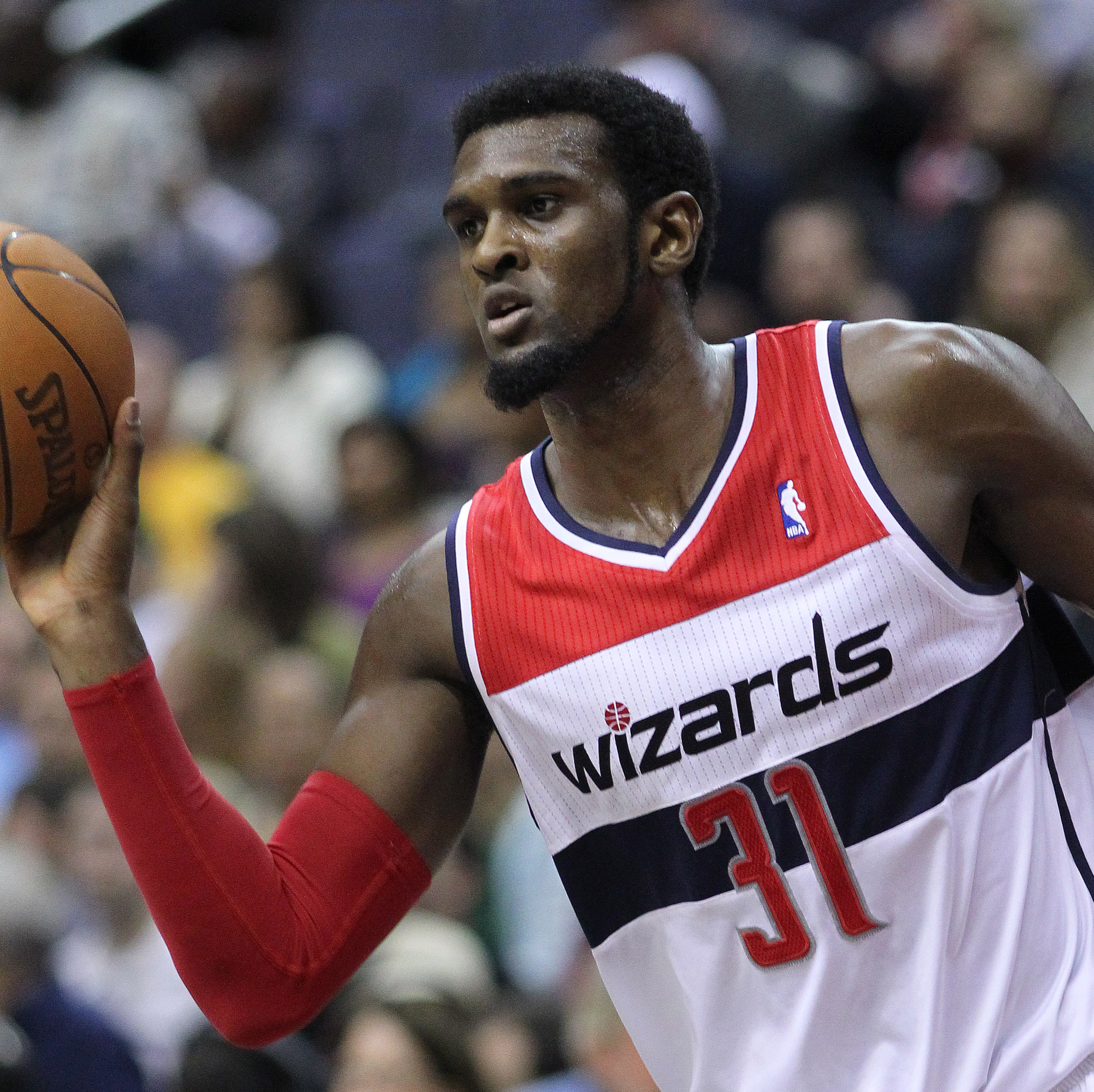
- Singleton with the Washington Wizards in 2012

Personal information
- Born: November 21, 1989 (age 36) Canton, Georgia, U.S.
- Listed height: 6 ft 9 in (2.06 m)
- Listed weight: 239 lb (108 kg)

Career information
- High school: Cherokee (Canton, Georgia); Dunwoody (Dunwoody, Georgia)
- College: Florida State (2008–2011)
- NBA draft: 2011: 1st round, 18th overall pick
- Drafted by: Washington Wizards
- Playing career: 2011–2024
- Position: Power forward / center

Career history
- 2011–2014: Washington Wizards
- 2014: Jiangsu Dragons
- 2015: Oklahoma City Blue
- 2015–2016: Lokomotiv Kuban
- 2016: Anhui Dragons
- 2016–2018: Panathinaikos
- 2018–2019: FC Barcelona
- 2019–2023: Anadolu Efes
- 2024: Al-Arabi

Career highlights
- 2× EuroLeague champion (2021, 2022); 2× TBSL champion (2021, 2023); Chinese NBL champion (2016); 2× Greek League champion (2017, 2018); Greek Cup winner (2017); Spanish King's Cup winner (2019); Turkish Cup winner (2022); Chinese NBL Finals MVP (2016); Chinese NBL All-Imports Team (2016); Chinese NBL All-Star (2016); Greek League PIR Leader (2017); 2× All-Greek League Team (2017, 2018); All-Greek League All-Imports Team (2018); 2× Third-team All-ACC (2010, 2011); ACC Defensive Player of the Year (2010); 2× ACC All-Defensive Team (2010, 2011); Third-team Parade All-American (2008); McDonald's All-American (2008)
- Stats at NBA.com
- Stats at Basketball Reference

Christopher Carl Singleton Jr. (born November 21, 1989) is an American former professional basketball player. Listed at 6'9" (2.06 m), he played as a power forward and small ball center. He played college basketball for the Florida State Seminoles.

== High school career ==
Singleton attended both Cherokee High School and Dunwoody High School.

Considered a five-star recruit by Rivals.com, Singleton was listed as the No. 3 small forward and the No. 12 player in the nation in 2008.

== College career ==
Singleton played three years of college basketball for the Florida State University Seminoles, where he earned ACC Defensive Player of the Year honors in 2011. After losing in the Sweet Sixteen of the 2011 NCAA Tournament, Singleton decided to leave FSU and declared himself eligible for the 2011 NBA draft.

== Professional career ==
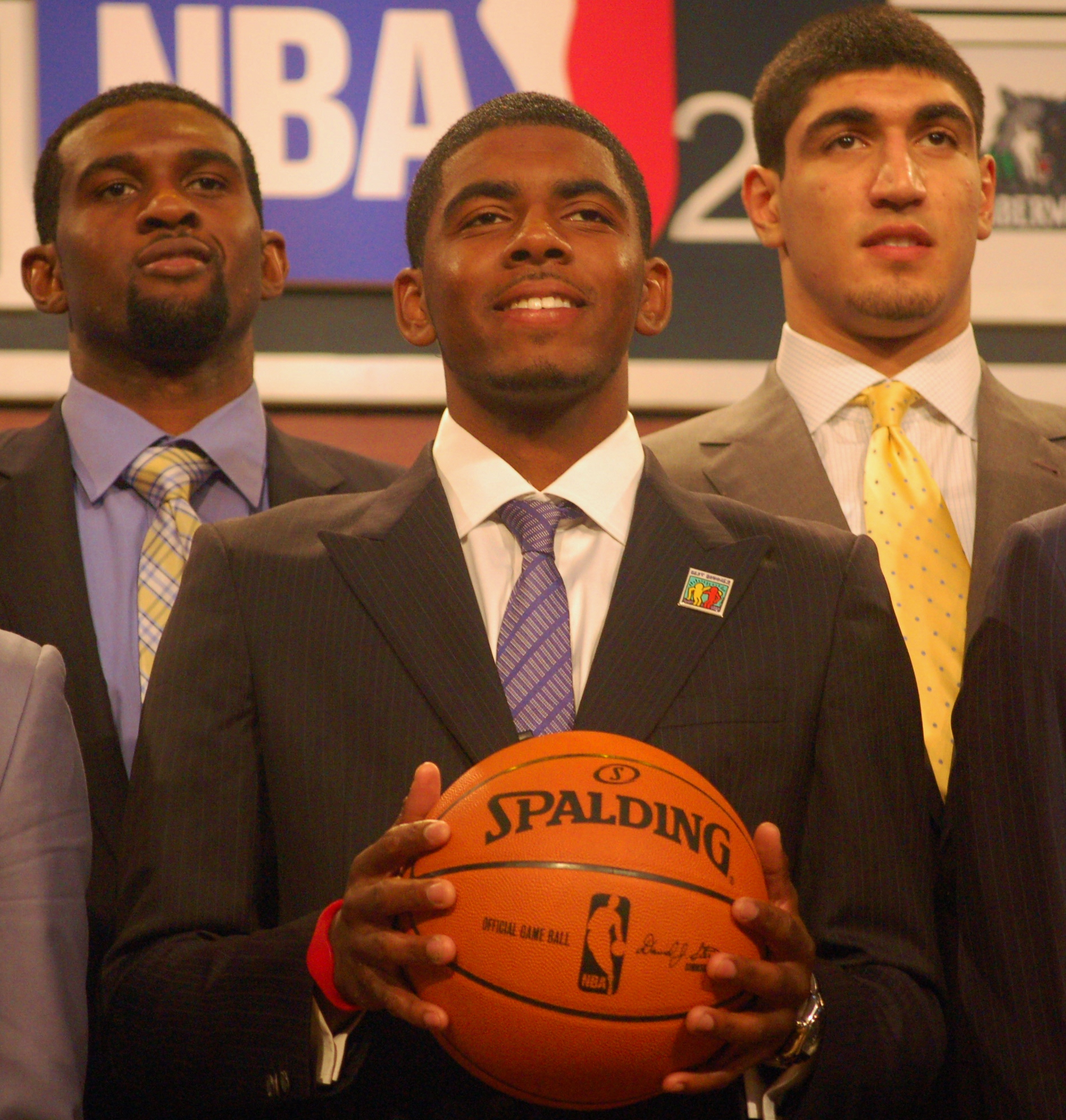
Singleton with Kyrie Irving and Enes Kanter at the 2011 NBA draft

On June 23, 2011, Singleton was selected by the Washington Wizards with the 18th overall pick in the 2011 NBA draft. On December 9, 2011, he signed with the Wizards. On March 22, 2012, he tied his career high 16 points in an 83–85 loss to the Indiana Pacers.

On September 5, 2014, Singleton signed with the Indiana Pacers. However, he was later waived by the Pacers on October 25, 2014. On October 31, 2014, he signed with the Jiangsu Dragons of the Chinese Basketball Association. In December 2014, he left Jiangsu after appearing in 17 games. On January 23, 2015, he was acquired by the Oklahoma City Blue of the NBA Development League.

On September 24, 2015, Singleton signed with the Russian team Lokomotiv Kuban for the 2015–16 season. In June 2016, he signed in China with the Anhui Dragons for the 2016 NBL season, where he won the championship and was named finals MVP.

On July 1, 2016, Singleton signed a one-year deal (with a team option for a second year) with Greek club Panathinaikos.

On July 17, 2018, Singleton signed a one-year deal with FC Barcelona Lassa of the Liga ACB and the EuroLeague.

On September 10, 2019, Singleton signed with Anadolu Efes of the Turkish Super League. On June 21, 2023, he mutually parted ways with the Turkish powerhouse after three-and-a-half successful seasons.

== Career statistics ==
Legend
GP	Games played	GS	Games started	MPG	Minutes per game
FG%	Field goal percentage	3P%	3-point field goal percentage	FT%	Free throw percentage
RPG	Rebounds per game	APG	Assists per game	SPG	Steals per game
BPG	Blocks per game	PPG	Points per game	**Bold**	Career high

=== NBA ===
==== Regular season ====
*	Led the league

Year	Team	GP	GS	MPG	FG%	3P%	FT%	RPG	APG	SPG	BPG	PPG
2011–12	Washington	**66***	**51**	**21.7**	.372	.346	.682	**3.5**	**.7**	**1.1**	**.5**	**4.6**
2012–13	Washington	57	11	16.2	**.382**	.194	.571	3.2	.6	.7	.4	4.1
2013–14	Washington	25	0	10.0	.373	**.368**	**.720**	2.2	.2	.4	.1	3.0
Career		148	62	17.6	.376	.319	.633	3.2	.6	.8	.4	4.1

=== EuroLeague ===
†	Denotes season in which Singleton won the EuroLeague
*	Led the league

Year	Team	GP	GS	MPG	FG%	3P%	FT%	RPG	APG	SPG	BPG	PPG	PIR
2015–16	Lokomotiv Kuban	31*	6	21.6	.415	.316	.730	4.5	1.0	1.2	.6	8.4	8.9
2016–17	Panathinaikos	33	29	28.2	**.496**	.436	.748	**5.9**	**1.2**	1.2	**1.0**	**12.0**	**15.6**
2017–18	Panathinaikos	34	**34**	**30.2**	.435	**.461**	.732	5.8	1.1	1.0	.7	10.3	12.5
2018–19	Barcelona	35	**34**	25.0	.374	.395	.774	4.4	.9	1.1	.5	8.0	8.7
2019–20	Anadolu Efes	28*	22	25.6	.418	.451	**.873**	4.4	1.0	**1.3**	.4	7.8	10.5
2020–21†	Anadolu Efes	**41***	19	22.0	.436	.396	.813	3.9	.6	.7	.5	6.1	8.3
2021–22†	Anadolu Efes	36	13	17.4	.351	.227	.821	2.8	.3	.8	.2	4.0	4.1
2022–23	Anadolu Efes	13	8	15.1	.429	.375	.625	1.8	.7	.5	.1	2.7	3.3
Career		251	165	23.7	.423	.395	.770	4.3	.8	1.0	.5	7.7	9.3

== Personal life ==
Singleton is the son of Stephanie Langston and Carl Singleton.
