= Anhui Wenyi Basketball Club =

Anhui Wenyi
- Leagues: National Basketball League
- Founded: December 9, 2013; 12 years ago
- Arena: Anhui Provincial Gymnasium
- Capacity: 6,300
- Location: Hefei, Anhui, China
- President: Zhou Wensuo
- General manager: Zhou Wensuo
- Head coach: (China) Zheng Wu
- Ownership: Anhui Wenyi Investment Holding Group
- Championships: 4 (2016、2019、2020、2023)
- Website: www.wenyiclub.com
Home

Anhui Wenyi Basketball Club, (in Chinese: 安徽文一篮球俱乐部) commonly known as simply Anhui Wenyi, are a Chinese professional basketball club based in Hefei, Anhui. The team plays in the National Basketball League. Founded in 2013, Wenyi won its first NBL championship in 2016.

The owner of the team is Anhui Wenyi Investment Holding Group.

== Honours ==
- National Basketball League
  - Winners (4): 2016, 2019, 2020, 2023
  - Runners-up (3): 2015, 2017, 2024

== Players ==
=== Current roster ===
Note: Flags indicate national team eligibility at FIBA-sanctioned events. Players may hold other non-FIBA nationalities not displayed.

Anhui Dragons roster
Players
Coaches

Pos.	No.	Nat.	Name	Ht.	Age
PG	1	(United States)	Evans, Jawun	1.85 m (6 ft 1 in)	29 – 26 July 1996
SG	2	(United States)	Mobley, Matt	1.94 m (6 ft 4 in)	31 – 1 September 1994
G	3	(China)	Yan, Xuchen	1.90 m (6 ft 3 in)	27 – 3 December 1998
F	5	(United States)	Wilson, Sid	2.01 m (6 ft 7 in)	26 – 10 April 1999
G	6	(China)	Gong, Yuanchang	1.90 m (6 ft 3 in)	23 – 11 August 2002
G	7	(China)	Lin, Juntao	1.92 m (6 ft 4 in)	22 – 8 September 2003
G/F	8	(China)	Yang, Wenbo	1.96 m (6 ft 5 in)	35 – 8 November 1990
PG	9	(China)	Li, Linfeng	1.88 m (6 ft 2 in)	24 – 1 April 2001
F/C	13	(China)	Shi, Yanbo	2.02 m (6 ft 8 in)	26 – 23 January 2000
C	15	(United States)	Dickerson, Noah	2.07 m (6 ft 9 in)	29 – 1 February 1997
F	16	(China)	Zou, Yunxuan	2.02 m (6 ft 8 in)	21 – 23 April 2004
F	18	(China)	Man, Yincheng	1.98 m (6 ft 6 in)	26 – 31 May 1999
G/F	21	(China)	Xu, Huizhuang	1.94 m (6 ft 4 in)	21 – 23 August 2004
SG	44	(United States)	Sampson, Brandon	1.96 m (6 ft 5 in)	28 – 1 May 1997
C	50	(China)	Yuan, Zhenliang	2.07 m (6 ft 9 in)	28 – 8 February 1998

Head coach

- (China) Xu Changsuo

Legend

- (C) Team captain
- Injured

- Roster
Updated: January 18, 2026

=== Notable players ===
Note: Flags indicate national team eligibility at FIBA-sanctioned events. Players may hold other non-FIBA nationalities not displayed.

Criteria

To appear in this section a player must have either:

- Set a club record or won an individual award while at the club
- Played at least one official international match for their national team at any time
- Played at least one official NBA match at any time.

- (United States) Darnell Jackson (2015)
- (United States) Manny Harris (2016)
- (United States) Chris Singleton (2016)
- (United States) Jonathan Gibson (2017)
- (United States) Bernard James (2017)
- (United States) Chris Johnson (2017)
- (United States) DeQuan Jones (2018)
- (United States) Jameel Warney (2018)
- (United States) Dakari Johnson (2019, 2023, 2024)
- (United States) Ricky Ledo (2023)
- (United States) Pierre Jackson (2024)
