= National Basketball League (China) =

Chinese professional basketball minor league

National Basketball League (NBL)
- Current season, competition or edition: 2025–26
- Sport: Basketball
- Founded: 2004
- First season: 2004
- No. of teams: 14
- Country: China
- Continent: FIBA Asia (Asia)
- Most recent champion: Hong Kong Bulls (3rd title)
- Most titles: Anhui Wenyi (4 titles)
- Level on pyramid: 2

The National Basketball League (simplified Chinese: 全国男子篮球联赛; traditional Chinese: 全國男子籃球聯賽; pinyin: Quánguó Nánzǐ Lánqiú Liánsài) is a professional basketball minor league in China, called the Chinese Basketball League (CBL) before 2006. It is commonly known as the NBL, and this name (spelled out in letters) is often used even in Chinese.

NBL is the second-tier league to the professional Chinese Basketball Association (CBA).

== Teams ==
=== Current teams ===
Updated to the 2026–27 season.

Team	City	Province	Founded	Joined
Anhui Wenyi	Hefei	Anhui	2013	2015
Changsha Yongsheng	Changsha	Hunan	2016	2017
Hefei Storm	Hefei	Anhui	2016	2016
Hong Kong Bulls	Wan Chai	Hong Kong	2023	2023
Suke Lions	Banan	Chongqing	2021	2021
Jiangxi Ganchi	Ganzhou	Jiangxi	2023	2023
Shijiazhuang Xianglan	Shijiazhuang	Hebei	2015	2016
Hubei Wenlv	Wuhan	Hubei	2022	2022
Shanghai Blackbird	Shanghai	Shanghai	2025	2025
Jiaozuo Cultural Tourism	Jiaozuo	Henan	2025	2025
Hangzhou Jingwei	Hangzhou	Zhejiang	2025	2025
Guizhou Raptors	Zunyi	Guizhou	2025	2025
Shandong Honey Badger	Jinan	Shandong	2025	2025
Zhangjiakou Sport Cultural Tourism	Zhangjiakou	Hebei	2025	2025

==== Name changes ====
Updated to 2023 National Basketball League (China) season.

- Jianghuai Lightning (江淮闪电)(2016) → Fujian Lightning (福建闪电)(2017–2018) → Anhui PutianXingfa (安徽莆田兴发) (2019–2020) → Fujian Son of the Wind (福建风之子) (2020–2022) → Hefei Storm (合肥狂风) (2023–)
- Guangxi Weizhuang (广西威壮) (2013–)
- Hebei Xianglan (河北翔蓝) (2016–2021) → Shijiazhuang Xianglan (石家庄翔蓝) (2022–)
- Hong Kong Bulls (香港金牛) (2023–)
- Hong Kong Xinlibao Bulls (香港新丽宝公牛) (2008–2012) → Hongkong Xingda (香港信达) （2013）→ Shaanxi Xingda Northwestern Wolves (陕西信达西北狼) （2014）→ Shaanxi Weinan Xingda Northwestern Wolves (陕西渭南信达西北狼) （2015) → Shaanxi Xingda Northwestern Wolves (陕西信达西北狼) （2016–2023）
- Hunan Yongsheng (湖南勇胜) → Hunan Jinjian Rice Industry (湖南金健米业) （2016–2019) → Changsha Jinjian Rice Industry (长沙金健米业) （2020–2021）→ Changsha Wantian Yongsheng (长沙湾田勇胜) （2022–）
- Jiangsu Yannan Suke (江苏盐南苏科) (2021–)
- Jiangxi Ganchi (江西赣驰) (2023–)
- Nanjing Military Region Yueda Great Wall (南京军区悦达长城) (2011–2015) → Eastern Army Yueda Great Wall (东部陆军悦达长城) (2016) → Eastern Yuanchuang Yueda Great Wall (东部原创悦达长城) (2017)/Nanjing Lishui Yueda Great Wall (南京溧水悦达长城) → Hefei Yuanchuang (合肥原创) (2018–2019）→ Foshan Kung Fu Boy (佛山功夫小子) (2020–2022）→ Liaoning Arctic Wolves (辽宁益胜/辽宁益胜雪狼) (2023）
- Zhengzhou Dayun (郑州大运) （2015) → Luoyang Jinxing Flaming Horses (洛阳金星) （2016) → Luoyang Zhonghe Flaming Horses (洛阳中赫) （2017–2018) → Luoyang Jinxing Haixiang Flaming Horses (洛阳金星海象) （2019）→ Hainan Jinxing Haixiang Flaming Horses (海南金星海象) （2020）→ Hainan Haikou Haixiang Flaming Horses (海南海口海象 ) （2021–）
- Wuhan Kunpeng (武汉锟鹏) (2022–)

=== Former teams ===
==== Joined the CBA ====
- Yunnan Honghe Running Bulls (云南红河奔牛) – 2004, now defunct
- Dongguan New Century Leopards (东莞新世纪烈豹) – 2005
- Zhejiang Guangsha Lions (浙江广厦猛狮) – 2006
- Qingdao Conson DoubleStar Eagles (青岛国信双星雄鹰) – 2008
- Tianjin Ronggang Gold Lions (天津荣钢金狮) – 2008
- Sichuan Jinqiang Blue Whales (四川金强蓝鲸) – 2013
- Chongqing Wansheng Black Valley Fly Dragons (重庆万盛黑山谷翱龙) – 2014
- Jiangsu Tongxi Monkey Kings (江苏同曦大圣) – 2014
- Guangzhou Free Man (广州自由人) → Chongqing Wansheng Black Valley Fly Dragons (重庆万盛黑山谷翱龙)

==== Defunct teams ====
- Beijing Bucks (北京东方雄鹿) – 2022
- Chongqing Huaxi International (重庆华熙国际) – 2022
- Guangzhou Whampoa Chateau Xingbao Liusui (广州黃埔星堡酒庄六穗) – 2013
- Guizhou Guwutang Tea White Tigers (贵州古雾堂茶白虎) (2020)
- Hanzhou Yongtong (杭州永通) – 2011
- Hebei Jidong Cement (河北冀东水泥) –
- Hebei Qingquan Running Horses (河北清泉奔马) – 2013
- Heilongjiang Daqing (黑龙江大庆) –
- Heilongjiang Zhaozhou Fengshen Sky Lions (黑龙江肇州丰绅天狮) – 2014
- Hubei Marco Polo (湖北马可波罗) – 2014
- Hunan Changsha Bank Park Lane Snow Wolves (湖南长沙银行柏宁雪狼) – 2014
- Jiangsu Guoli Lions (江苏国立雄狮) （2018）
- Jiangxi Xingye Flaming Horses (江西鑫业烈焰马) – 2014
- Lhasa Pure Land (拉萨净土) – 2018
- Shanxi Yujin (山西宇晋) – 2006, merged with the Henan Renhe Dragons (河南仁和猛龙) to form Shanxi Yujin Dragons (山西宇晋猛龙)
- Shenyang Dongjin (沈阳东进) – 2011
- Sichuan Shidai Glacier (四川时代冰川)
- Team Tianjin (天津市男子篮球队) – no nickname or sponsor
- Weihai Xinli (威海新力) – 2013
- Wuhan Dangdai (武汉当代) – 2021
- Xinjiang Tianshan Xiongying (新疆天山雄鹰) – 2023
- Yingkou Donghua Shenyang Army (营口东华沈阳部队)

===== Name changes =====
- Beijing Bucks (北京东方雄鹿) (2015) → Beijing Capital Sports Shares Eastern Bucks (北京首体股份东方雄鹿) (2016) → Beijing Bucks (北京雄鹿) (2017) → Beijing Guoan Bucks (北京国安雄鹿) (2018) → Beijing Bucks (北京雄鹿) (2019)
- Jiangsu Hualan Royal Pandas (江苏华兰皇家熊猫) （2016) → Chongqing Sanhai Lanling Royal Pandas (重庆三海兰陵皇家熊猫) （2017) → Chongqing Linglong Luntai (重庆玲珑轮胎) （2018）→ Chongqing Huaxi International (重庆华熙国际) （2019–2021）
- Guizhou Shenghang Snow Leopards (贵州森航雪豹) （2014–2017) → Guizhou Guwutang Tea White Tigers (贵州古雾堂茶白虎) (2018–2019)
- Dongguan Park Lane (东莞柏宁) → Hunan Changsha Bank Park Lane Snow Wolves (湖南长沙银行柏宁雪狼)
- Guangzhou Whampoa Liusui (广州黃埔六穗) → Guangzhou Whampoa Chateau Xingbao Liusui (广州黃埔星堡酒庄六穗)
- Henan Renhe (河南仁和) → Shanxi Yujin (山西宇晋)
- Team Hubei (湖北省男子篮球队) → Hubei Marco Polo (湖北马可波罗)
- Jiangsu Guoli Lions (江苏国立雄狮) （2012–2015）→ Jiangsu Guoli Qifu Lions (江苏国立汽服雄狮) (2016–2017) → Jiangsu Guoli Lions (江苏国立雄狮) （2018）
- Henan Jiyuan Iron and Steel (河南济源钢铁) (2006–2011)→ Henan Jiyuan Coal Industry (河南济源煤业) (2012) → Henan Shedian Laojiu (河南赊店老酒) (2013–2025)

== History ==
=== Inaugural season ===
The first regular season of the CBL began in April 2004. Eight teams advanced to the playoffs:

- Yunnan Honghe Running Bulls (云南红河奔牛)
- Yingkou Donghua Shenyang Army (营口东华沈阳部队)
- Hebei Jidong Cement (河北冀东水泥)
- Sichuan Shidai Glacier (四川时代冰川)
- Shanxi Yujin (山西宇晋)
- Heilongjiang Daqing (黑龙江大庆)
- Dongguan New Century Leopards (东莞新世纪烈豹)
- Team Tianjin (天津市男子篮球队) – no nickname or sponsor

On 4 August 2004, Yunnan Honghe Running Bulls defeated Dongguan New Century Leopards to win the first-ever CBL championship and were promoted to the CBA for the 2004–2005 season.

=== 2009 NBL ladder (championship round) ===
Rank	Team	Played	Win(s)	Losses	Last 5	Streak	PF per game	PA per game	PD per game	Winning %
1	Dongguan Park Lane (东莞柏宁)	14	11	3	4–1	W1	92.57	81.5	11.07	78.6%
2	Guangzhou Free Man (广州自由人)	14	11	3	4–1	W2	94.71	88.43	6.28	78.6%
3	Jiangsu Tongxi (江苏同曦)	14	10	4	3–2	W3	98.71	91.86	6.85	71.4%
4	Heilongjiang Zhaozhou Fengshen Sky Lions (黑龙江肇州丰绅天狮)	14	6	8	3–2	L1	94	92.14	1.86	42.9%
5	Shenyang Dongjin (沈阳东进)	14	6	8	3–2	L2	88.5	89.29	−0.79	42.9%
6	Henan Jiyuan Iron and Steel (河南济源钢铁)	14	6	8	1–4	W1	91.29	98.43	−7.14	42.9%
7	Guangzhou Whampoa Liusui (广州黃埔六穗)	14	5	9	1–4	L1	93.07	97.14	−4.07	35.7%
8	Hanzhou Yongtong (杭州永通)	14	1	13	1–4	L2	85.64	99.71	−14.07	7.1%

== See also ==
- Sport in China
- China men's national basketball team
- China women's national basketball team
- Chinese Basketball Association (CBA)
- Women's Chinese Basketball Association (WCBA)
- Chinese University Basketball Association (CUBA)
- List of National Basketball League (China) scoring leaders
