= Harrison twins =

Harrison twins may refer to a set of American twin basketball players, who played together for the University of Kentucky Wildcats:

- Aaron Harrison (born 1994), played in the National Basketball Association for the Charlotte Hornets and Dallas Mavericks; currently plays for the Greek club Olympiacos, of the EuroLeague.
- Andrew Harrison (born 1994), played in the National Basketball Association for the Memphis Grizzlies, Cleveland Cavaliers, and New Orleans Pelicans; currently plays for the Beijing Royal Fighters of the Chinese Basketball Association.
