= Justin Hill (basketball) =

American basketball player (born 2001)

Free agent
- Position: Point guard

Personal information
- Born: October 19, 2001 (age 25) Houston, Texas, U.S.
- Listed height: 5 ft 11 in (1.80 m)
- Listed weight: 191 lb (87 kg)

Career information
- High school: Travis (Pecan Grove, Texas)
- College: Longwood (2020–2022); Georgia (2022–2024); Wichita State (2024–2025)
- NBA draft: 2025: undrafted

Career highlights
- First-team All-Big South (2022); Big South All-Freshman Team (2021)

Justin Alexander Hill (born October 19, 2001) is an American basketball player. As of July 2025 he is an unsigned free agent. In college, Hill most recently played for the Wichita State Shockers of the American Athletic Conference (AAC). He had spent his first two seasons at Longwood and his second two at Georgia.

== Early life and high school ==
Hill was born on October 19, 2001. He was raised in Houston, Texas and attended Travis High School in the city of Pecan Grove, Texas inside the Greater Houston metropolitan area, where he played basketball.

As a senior, Hill averaged 24.0 points, 7.0 rebounds, and 4.0 assists, helping Travis achieve a 31–7 record and win two playoff games before the remainder of the season was canceled because of the COVID-19 pandemic. Hill was named the most valuable player in his Texas 6A district and named to the Texas 6A All-State team as a result of his production. Additionally, Hill was a finalist for the Greater Houston Area Player of the Year award. In total, Hill was named an all-district player three of his four years in high school.

== College career ==
=== Longwood ===
==== 2020–21 season ====
Hill first committed to Longwood to play basketball. In his collegiate debut, Hill scored 11 points with 2 rebounds and 4 assists in a loss against Wake Forest. Hill recorded his first 20-point game with 20 points on January 20 in a win against High Point. On February 25, Hill scored a season-high 25 points in a win against Gardner-Webb. Hill finished the season averaging 11.0 points, 4.2 rebounds, and 3.1 assists, with the average for both points and assists being the second-highest for a freshman in Longwood history. Additionally, Hill was named Big South Freshman of the Week three times and was named to the Big South All-Freshman Team.

==== 2021–22 season ====
Hill was named a starter before the beginning of the season for Longwood. On January 29, Hill set a season and career-high in points with 29 in a win against Winthrop. On February 17, Hill recorded his first double-double, scoring 18 points along with 10 rebounds in a win against High Point. By the end of the season, Hill averaged 14.2 points, 4.8 rebounds, and 4.1 assists, helping Longwood win the Big South Tournament and make their first-ever NCAA Tournament appearance. Hill was also named first-team All-Big South and a finalist for the Lou Henson Award.

=== Georgia ===
==== 2022–23 season ====
Following two years at Longwood, Hill opted to transfer to Georgia and play basketball there. In his debut game for Georgia, Hill scored 8 points with 4 rebounds and 3 assists in a win against Western Carolina. On February 4, Hill scored a season-high 20 points in a loss against Texas A&M. In his first year at Georgia, Hill averaged 8.6 points, 2.7 rebounds, and 2.9 assists.

==== 2023–24 season ====
As a part of the ACC–SEC Challenge, Hill scored 13 points and hit a game-winning shot with less than a second remaining to win against Florida State. Hill scored his highest points in SEC play in both games against Arkansas, with 19 on January 10 in a win, and 18 on February 10 in a loss. On March 25, Hill scored a season-high 21 points in a win against Wake Forest during the second round of the 2024 NIT. Hill started 3 games and played in all 37 for Georgia, averaging 9.5 points, 1.7 rebounds, and 3.2 assists.

=== Wichita State ===
For his additional year of eligibility due to the shortened 2020–21 season, Hill transferred to Wichita State to play basketball.

== Personal life ==
Hill is the son of Keith and Donna Hill. Keith played college basketball for Michigan State and New Mexico State while Donna played for Virginia and was the 1988 ACC Player of the Year there.

== Career statistics ==
Legend
GP	Games played	GS	Games started	MPG	Minutes per game
FG%	Field goal percentage	3P%	3-point field goal percentage	FT%	Free throw percentage
RPG	Rebounds per game	APG	Assists per game	SPG	Steals per game
BPG	Blocks per game	PPG	Points per game	**Bold**	Career high

=== College ===
Year	Team	GP	GS	MPG	FG%	3P%	FT%	RPG	APG	SPG	BPG	PPG
2020–21	Longwood	27	10	26.7	**.430**	.329	.725	4.2	3.1	.9	.0	11.0
2021–22	Longwood	31	**30**	**30.9**	.419	**.343**	**.797**	**4.8**	**4.1**	**1.5**	**.1**	**14.2**
2022–23	Georgia	32	10	22.2	.380	.297	.793	2.7	2.9	.7	**.1**	8.6
2023–24	Georgia	**37**	3	24.0	.379	.333	.701	1.7	3.2	.0	.5	9.5
2024–25	Wichita State	28	20	25.0	.345	.250	.762	2.5	2.8	1.0	**.1**	10.2
Career		155	73	25.7	.392	.310	.759	3.1	3.2	.9	.1	10.7
