= Aliana =

Aliana may refer to:

- Aliana, Texas, a planned community in Fort Bend County, Texas
- Aliana Lohan, American singer, actress, fashion model and television personality
- Aliana Vakaloloma, Fijian footballer

== See also ==
- Eliana, a female given name
