= Aliana, Texas =

Neighbourhood in Fort Bend County, Texas

Aliana
- Community in Fort Bend County
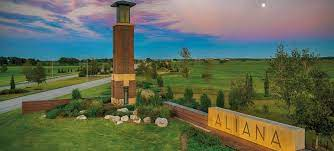
- Aliana entrance at West Airport

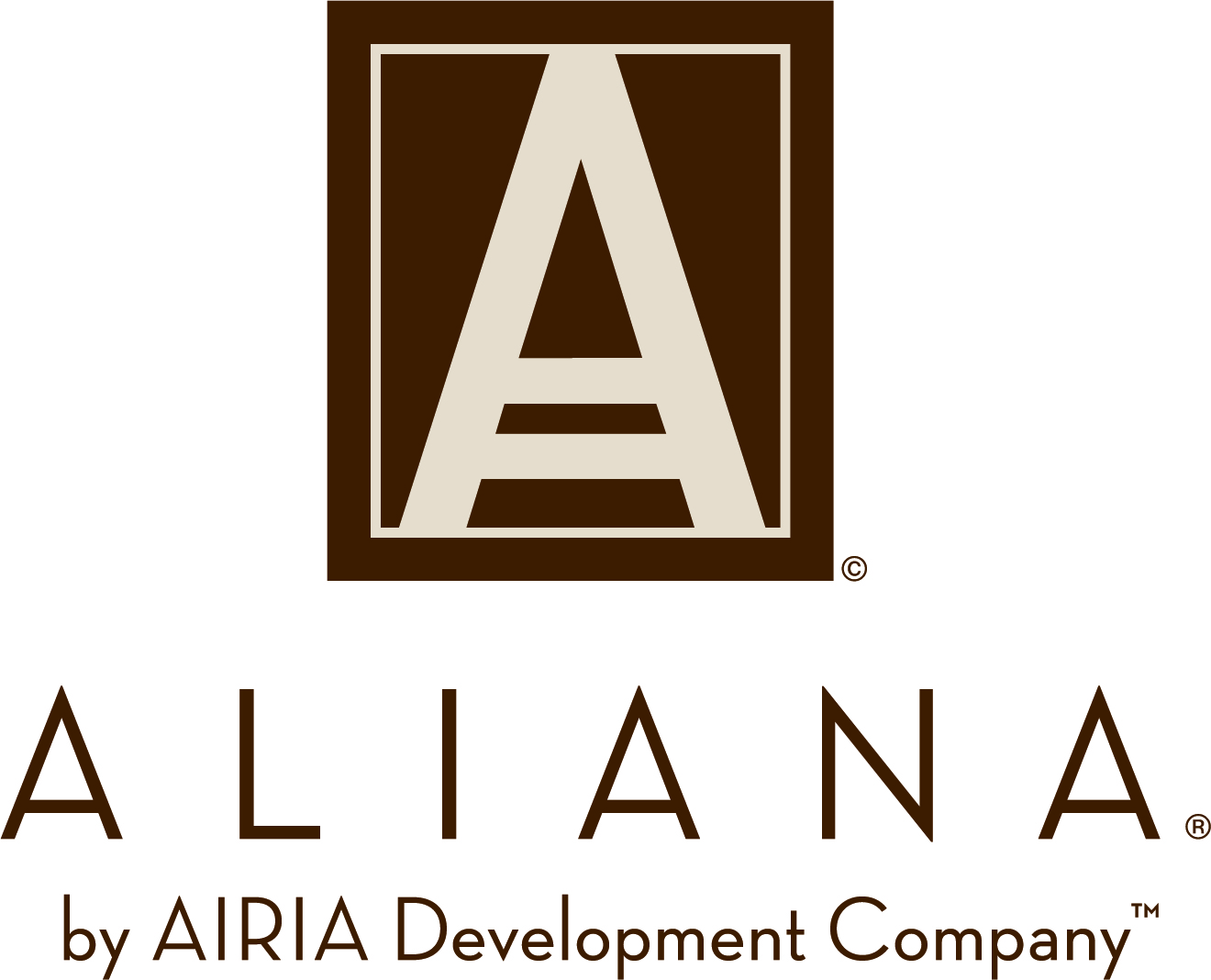
- Logo
- Interactive map of Aliana
- Location within the state of Texas Aliana (the United States)
- Coordinates: 29°39′09″N 95°41′45″W
- Country: United States
- State: Texas
- County: Fort Bend
- Neighborhoods: List: Ascot; Ashgrove; Aviara; Bretton Woods; Crosshill; Lamplight; Marchmont; Newhaven; Saratoga; Tanglewood; Waterchase; Windsor; Woodhall
- Time zone: UTC-6 (Central (CST))
  - Summer (DST): UTC-5 (Central (CDT))
- ZIP code: 77407
- Website: https://alianaliving.com/

Aliana is a 2,300-acre planned community in unincorporated Fort Bend County, Texas, United States. It consists of 13 subdivisions and is within the Greater Houston area. All properties in Aliana have a Richmond address. The community is completely served by Fort Bend Independent School District and is located along Grand Parkway.

== Geography ==
Aliana is mostly within the extraterritorial jurisdiction of Houston, and is northwest of Sugar Land and east of Pecan Grove.

The community stretches from State Highway 99 to FM 1464, neighboring the Old Orchard neighborhood and future development of the Harvest Green community.

== Culture ==
Aliana has two clubhouses, The Club at Aliana and The Westmoor Club. Both locations have a gymnasium, tennis courts, and a pool.

Additionally, Aliana has seven parks, lakes, and jurisdictional wetlands.

Located around Aliana are multiple outdoor commercial developments, the largest one being in the northwestern corner of the community. In April 2016, an H-E-B grocery store opened at the corner of Harlem Road and West Bellfort Street. In May 2021, a Houston Methodist multispecialty facility opened. In November 2021, a 3.7 million sq. ft. Amazon fulfillment center opened across West Bellfort Road.

Aliana has a community council named Kith & Kin that is funded by a 0.50% fee paid for by the selling homeowner in each resale.

== Government ==
Although all properties in Aliana have a Richmond address, the entire community lies outside any city jurisdiction. Fort Bend County MUD's serve the electrical, water, and other municipal needs of the area.

The Northeast Fort Bend County Volunteer Fire Station #2 provides fire services to the community.

In addition to regular policing, the Fort Bend County Sheriff's Department operates a patrol around the Aliana area.

== Education ==
Aliana is within the Fort Bend Independent School District.

Elementary Schools

Presently, the subdivisions of Aliana north of West Airport Boulevard and east of Westmoor Drive are zoned to Carolyn and Vernon Madden Elementary, and all other subdivisions are zoned to Malala Yousafzai Elementary.

In December 2025, Fort Bend ISD proposed a rezoning agenda to address the overcrowding at nearby James C. Neill Elementary School in the Harvest Green master-planned community, just west of Aliana. This proposal was finalized in March 2026. Aliana will be split into 3 elementary schools in the 2026-2027 school year. As a result, part of Neil Elementary will be rezoned to Malala Yousafzai Elementary, in order to relieve overcrowding at Neill Elementary.

- The sections south of West Airport Blvd will be served by Malala Yousafzai Elementary School.

- The sections north of West Airport Blvd and south of West Bellfort Blvd will be served by Carolyn & Vernon Madden Elementary School.

- The sections north of West Bellfort Blvd, including Windsor and Bretton Woods subdivisions, will be served by Mary Austin Holley Elementary School.

The rezoning of the Aliana subdivisions Windsor and Bretton Woods to Holley Elementary was largely received negatively by the Aliana community. One of the concerns raised was due to Holley Elementary not being part of the Garcia Middle School feeder pattern, with a majority of students enrolled in Holley Elementary being zoned to Hodges Bend Middle School. Another recurring complaint was that Holley Elementary is perceived as a lower performing school due to the schools state required testing results falling below average in math, science, and reading subjects.

Middle Schools

The entire community is zoned to Macario Garcia Middle School. Previously, James Bowie Middle School served the part of the neighborhood north of West Airport.

High Schools

The portions of Aliana south of West Airport are served by Stephen F. Austin High School, and the rest by William B. Travis High School.

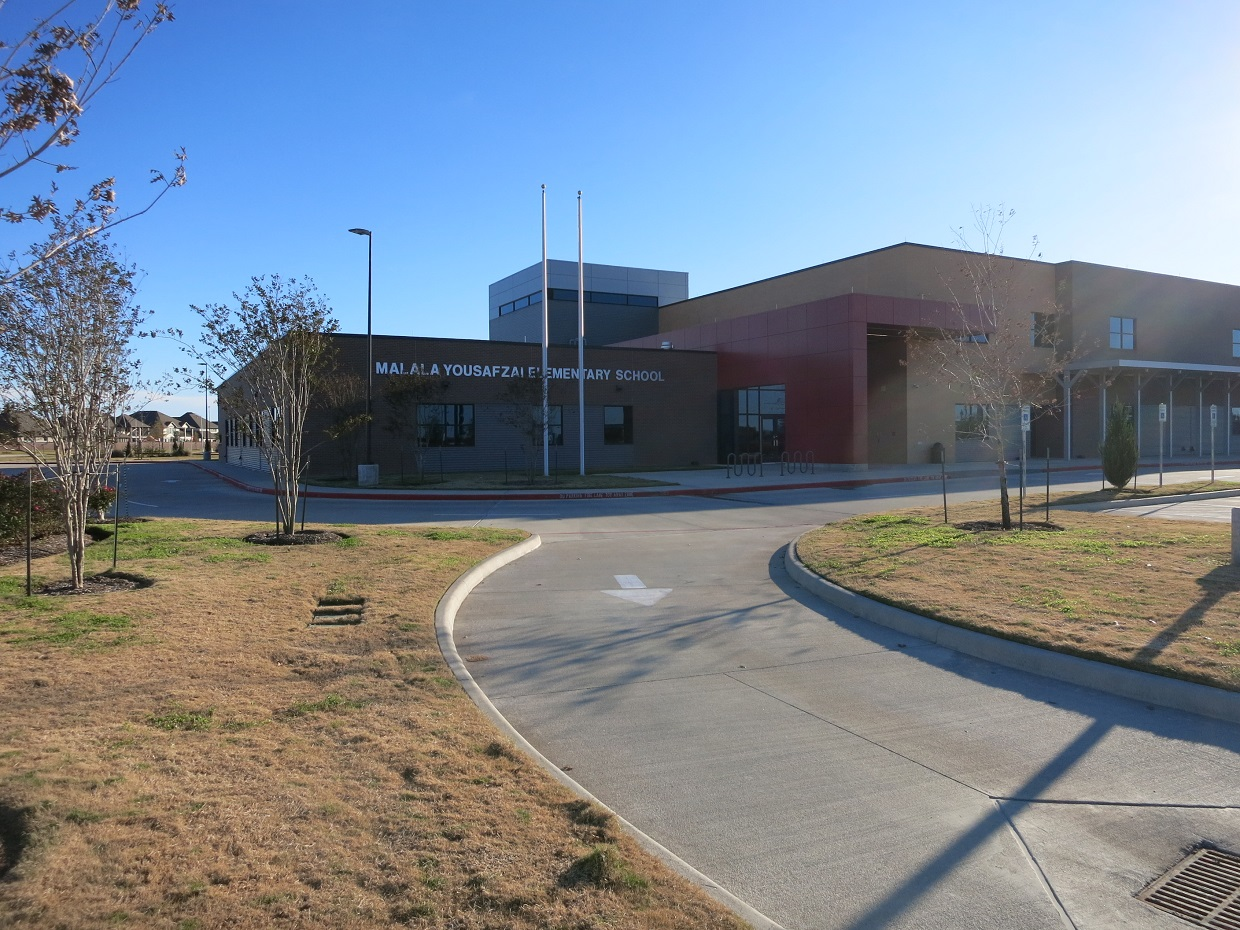
Malala Yousafzai Elementary

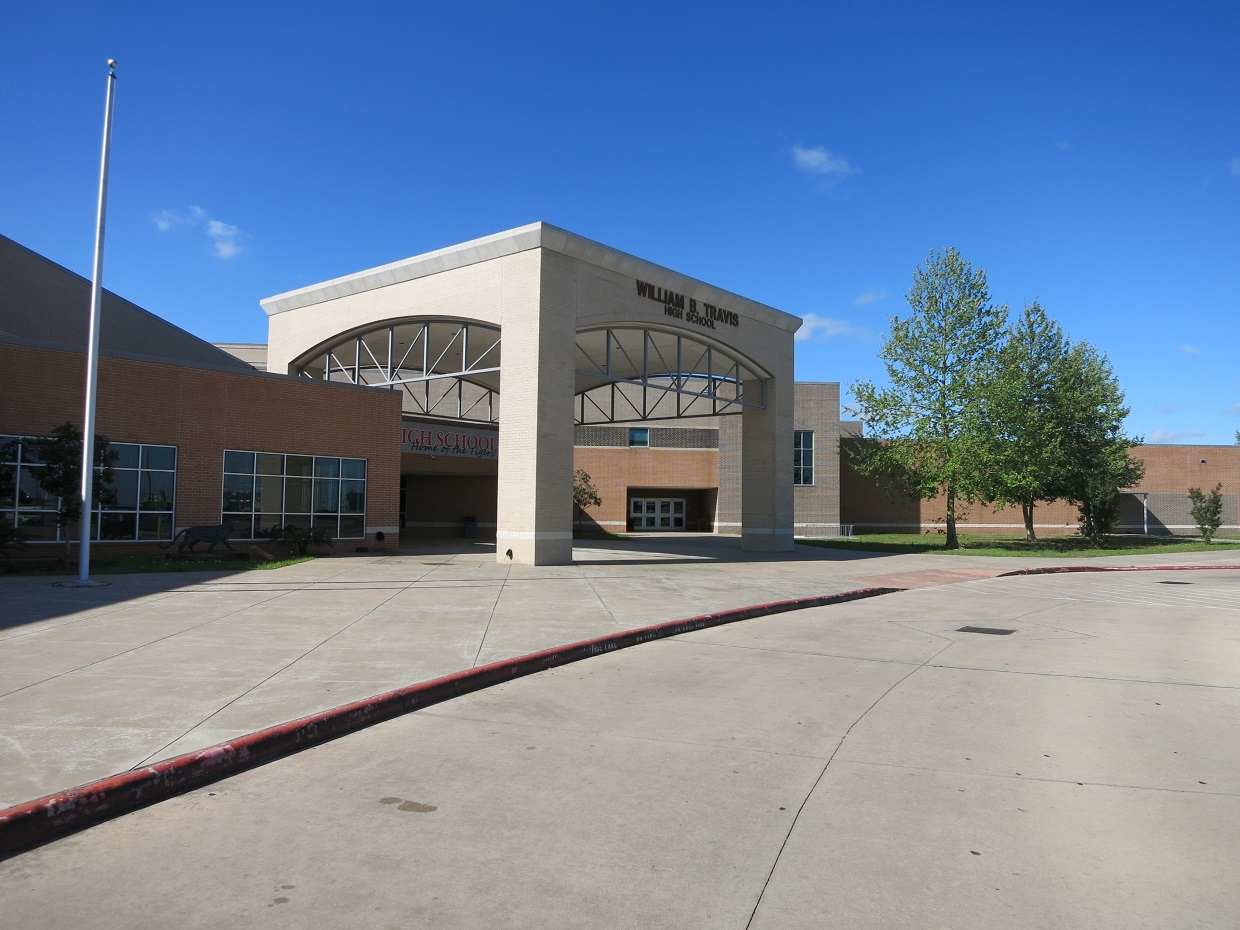
William B. Travis High School

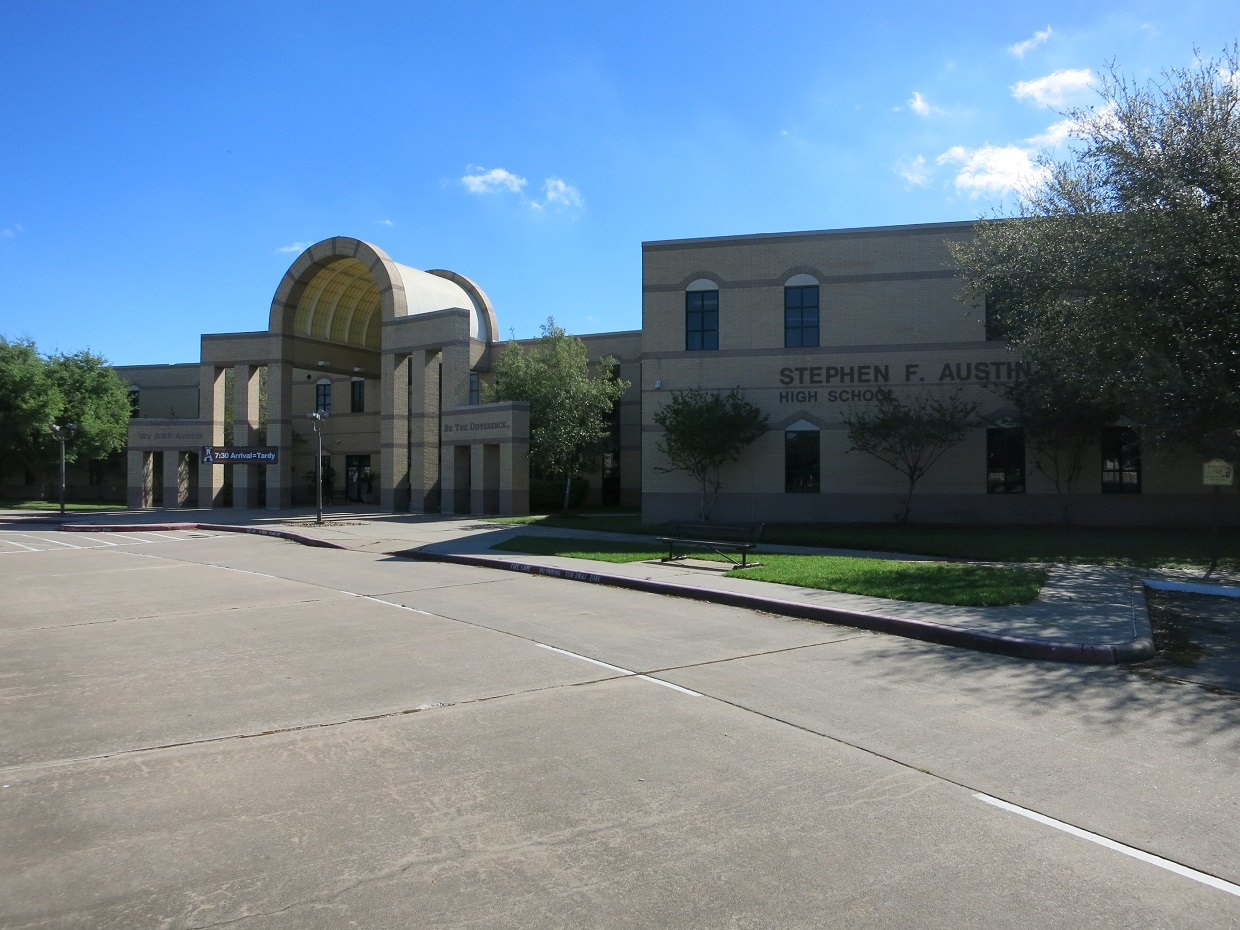
Stephen F. Austin High School
