= 2015 NBA draft =

Basketball player selection

General information
- Sport: Basketball
- Date: June 25, 2015
- Location: Barclays Center (Brooklyn, New York)
- Network: ESPN

Overview
- 60 total selections in 2 rounds
- League: NBA
- First selection: Karl-Anthony Towns (Minnesota Timberwolves)

The 2015 NBA draft was held on June 25, 2015, at Barclays Center in Brooklyn. It was televised nationally in the United States by ESPN. National Basketball Association (NBA) teams took turns selecting amateur U.S. college basketball players and other eligible players, including international players. The draft lottery took place on May 19, 2015.

The Minnesota Timberwolves won the draft lottery to earn the first overall pick in the draft. It marked the first time in Timberwolves history that they would receive the first overall pick through the lottery. The player selected would also be the third consecutive number one pick on the Timberwolves roster, joining Andrew Wiggins (2014) and Anthony Bennett (2013) - who were traded to Minnesota for forward Kevin Love. This draft also gave the Los Angeles Lakers the second overall pick after jumping over the Philadelphia 76ers and the New York Knicks within the draft lottery.

Highlights from the draft include the first Dominican to be the first overall pick (Karl-Anthony Towns), the highest number of Kentucky Wildcats selected in the draft lottery (four with Karl-Anthony Towns, Willie Cauley-Stein, Trey Lyles, and Devin Booker), which tied the North Carolina Tar Heels in 2005 for most players selected in the lottery by one school; the tied record for most Kentucky players selected in the draft (six with Towns, Cauley-Stein, Lyles, Booker, Andrew Harrison, and Dakari Johnson), the second Latvian to have been drafted in the first round (Kristaps Porziņģis), the first former high school player to have skipped college to play in China that was selected in the draft (Emmanuel Mudiay), and the first Indian-born player to have been selected in the NBA (Satnam Singh), who was also the first player since 2005 to have been drafted directly from high school (albeit as a postgraduate).

Other noteworthy announcements that came out of the draft included the official announcement of the passing of the last pioneer of the original NBA, Harvey Pollack, around the third pick and the resignation of the league's president of basketball operations Rod Thorn that became official in August after the end of the first round.

== Draft selections ==
PG	Point guard	SG	Shooting guard	SF	Small forward	PF	Power forward	C	Center

*	Denotes player who has been selected for at least one All-Star Game and All-NBA Team
^{+}	Denotes player who has been selected for at least one All-Star Game
^{#}	Denotes player who has never appeared in an NBA regular-season or playoff game
^{~}	Denotes player who has been selected as Rookie of the Year

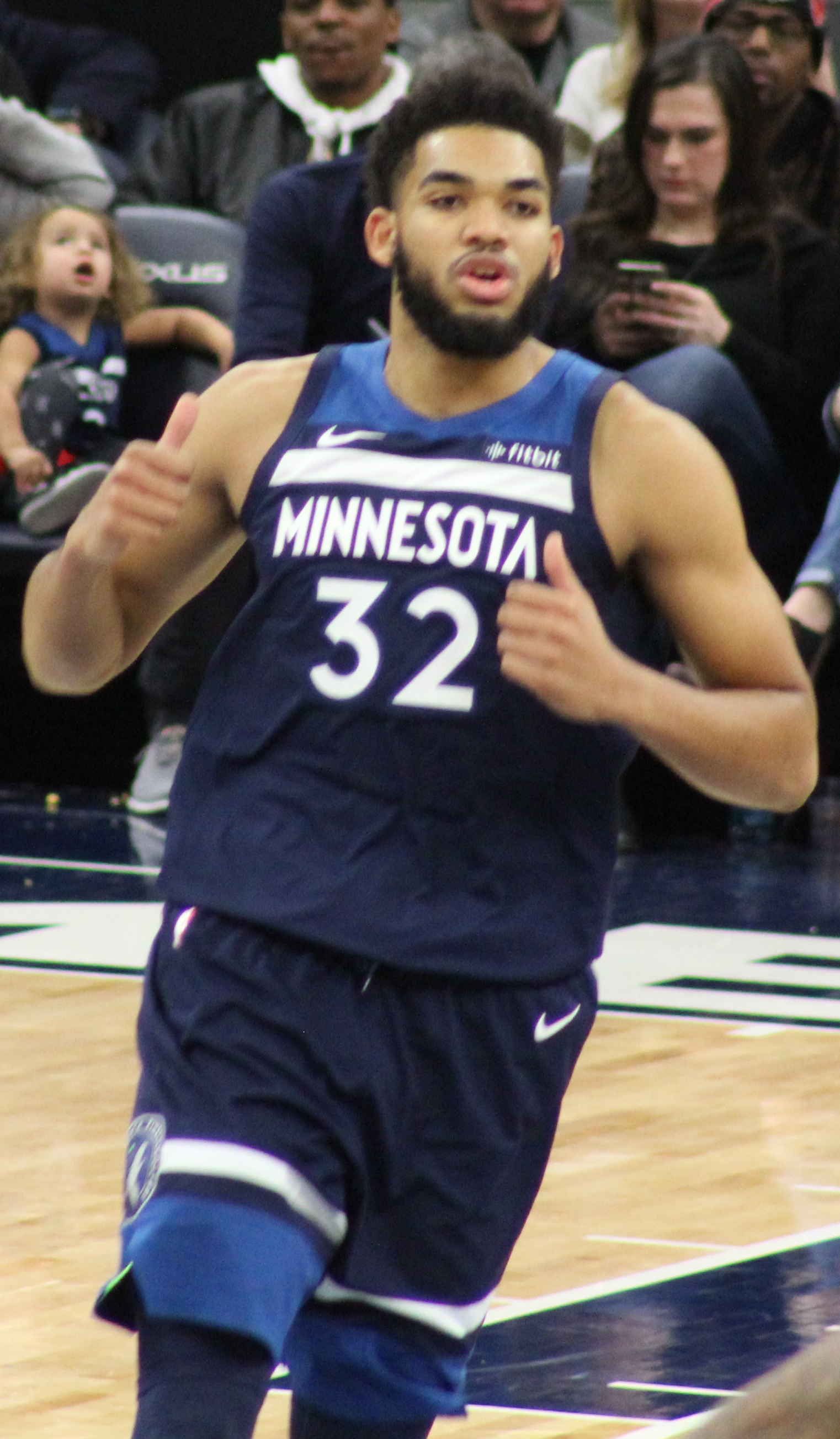
Karl-Anthony Towns was selected first overall by the Minnesota Timberwolves.

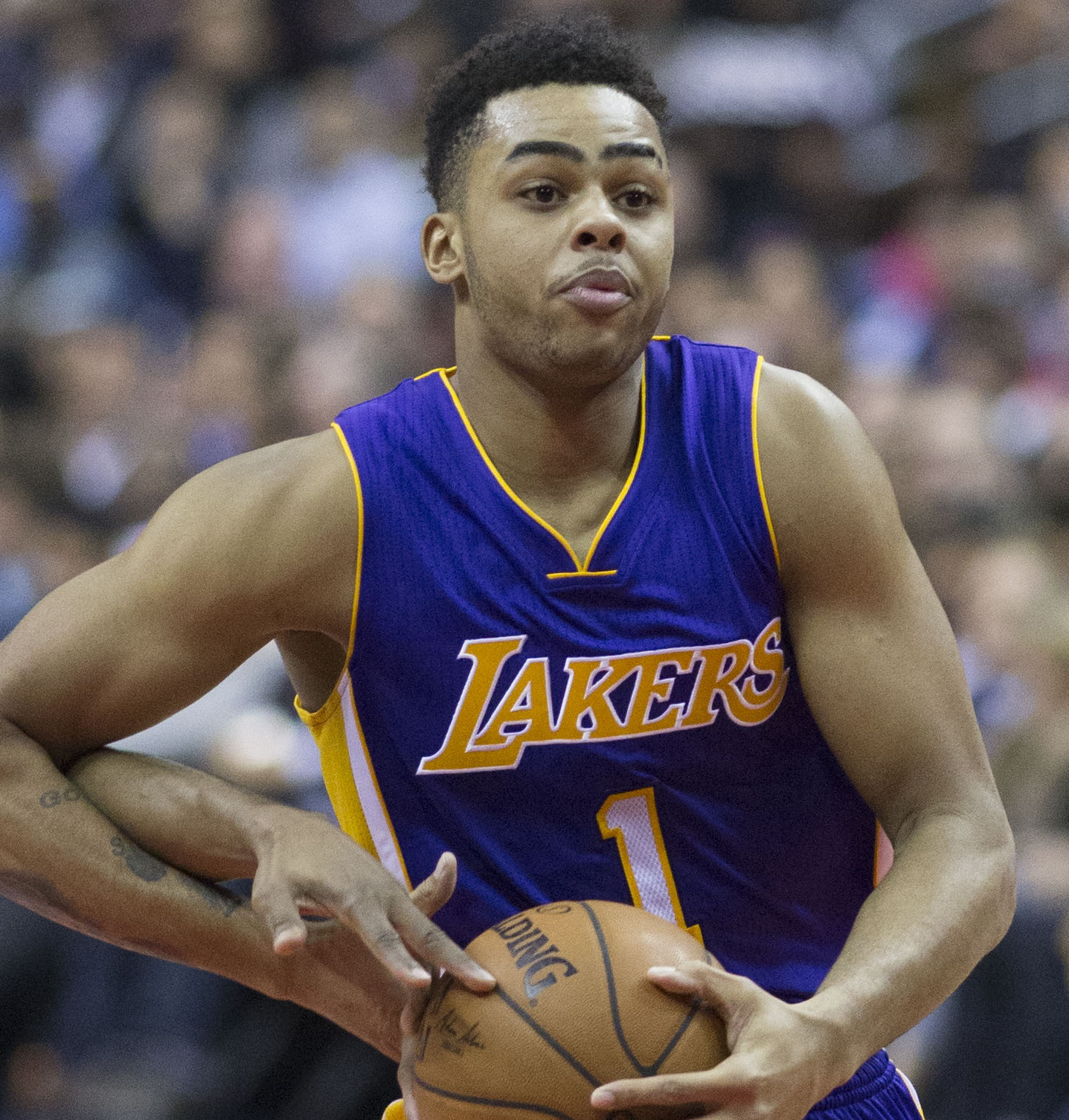
D'Angelo Russell was selected second by the Los Angeles Lakers.

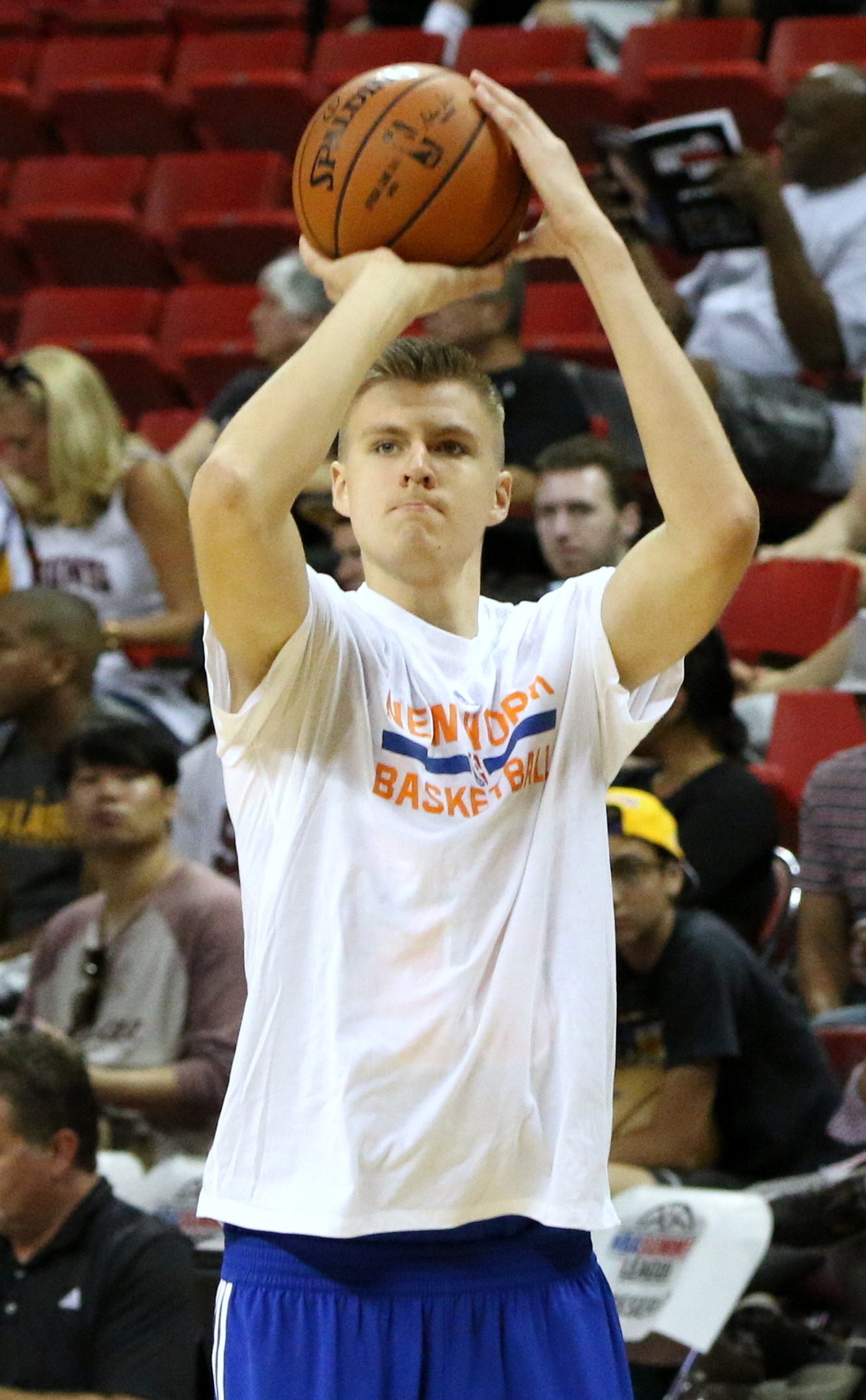
Kristaps Porziņģis was selected fourth by the New York Knicks.

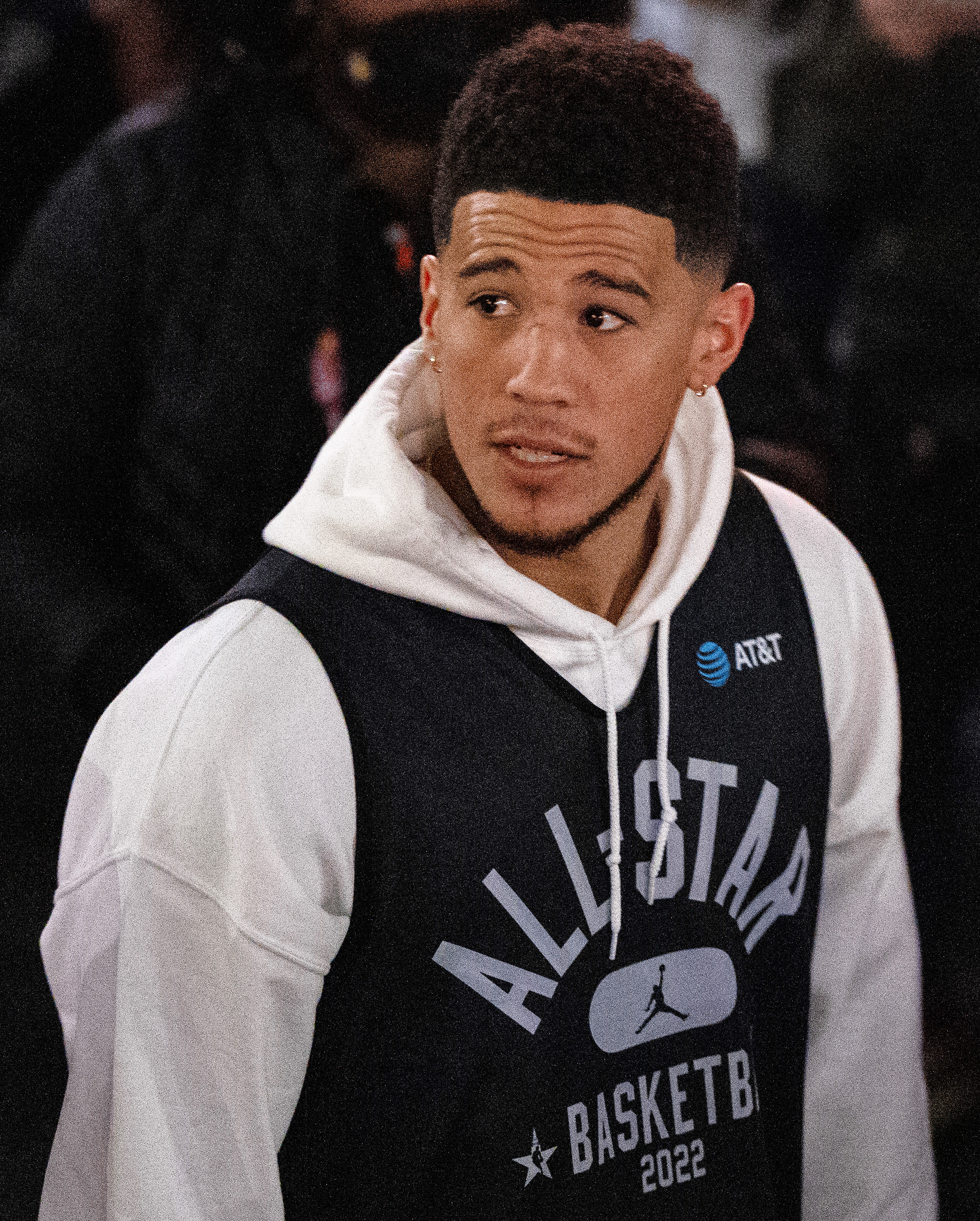
Devin Booker was selected 13th by the Phoenix Suns.

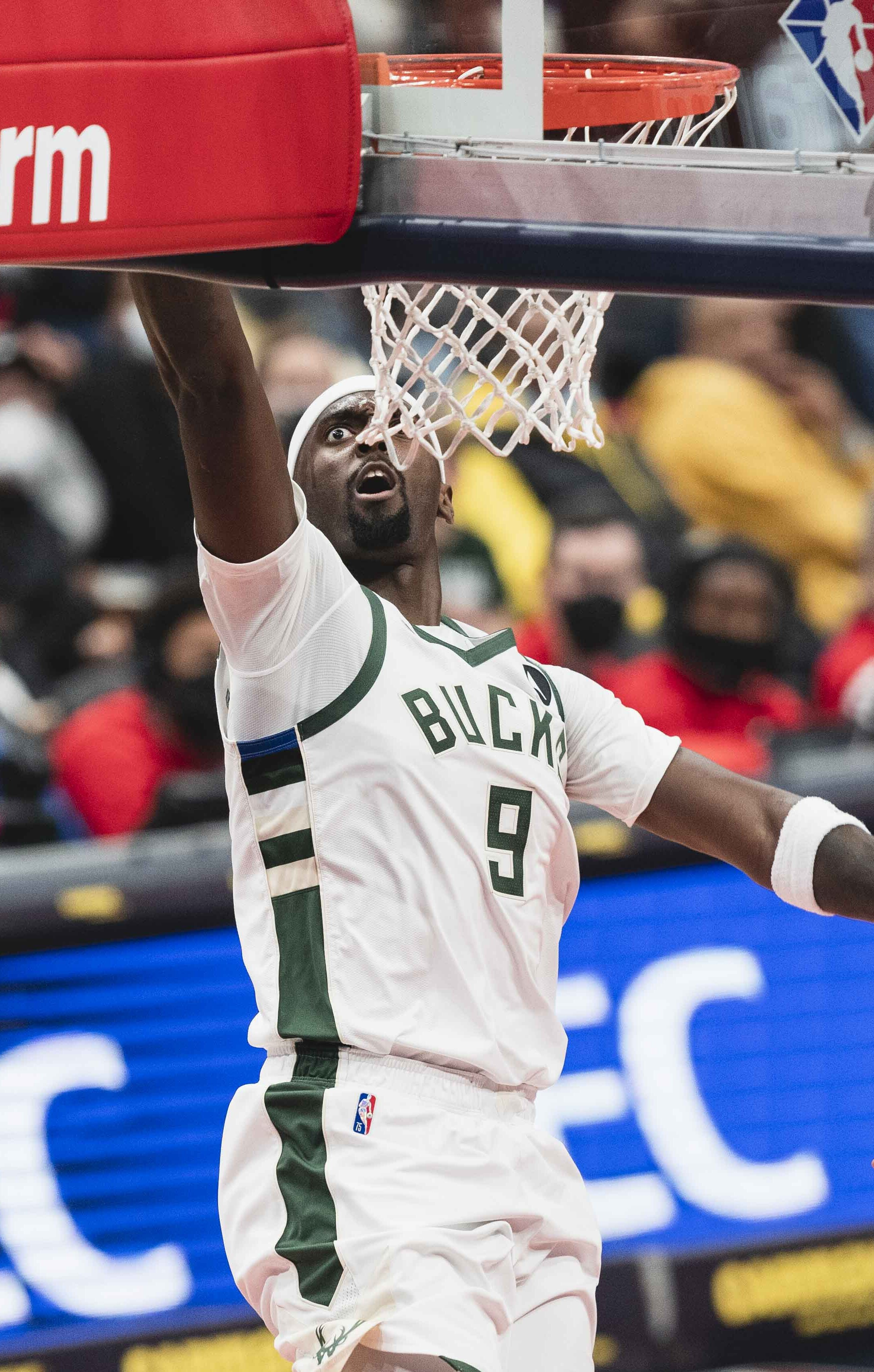
Bobby Portis was selected 22nd by the Chicago Bulls.

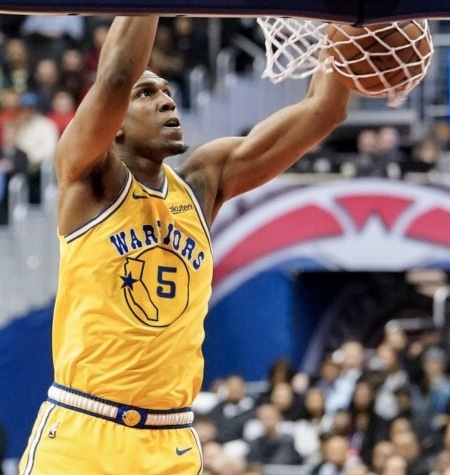
Kevon Looney was selected 30th by the Golden State Warriors.

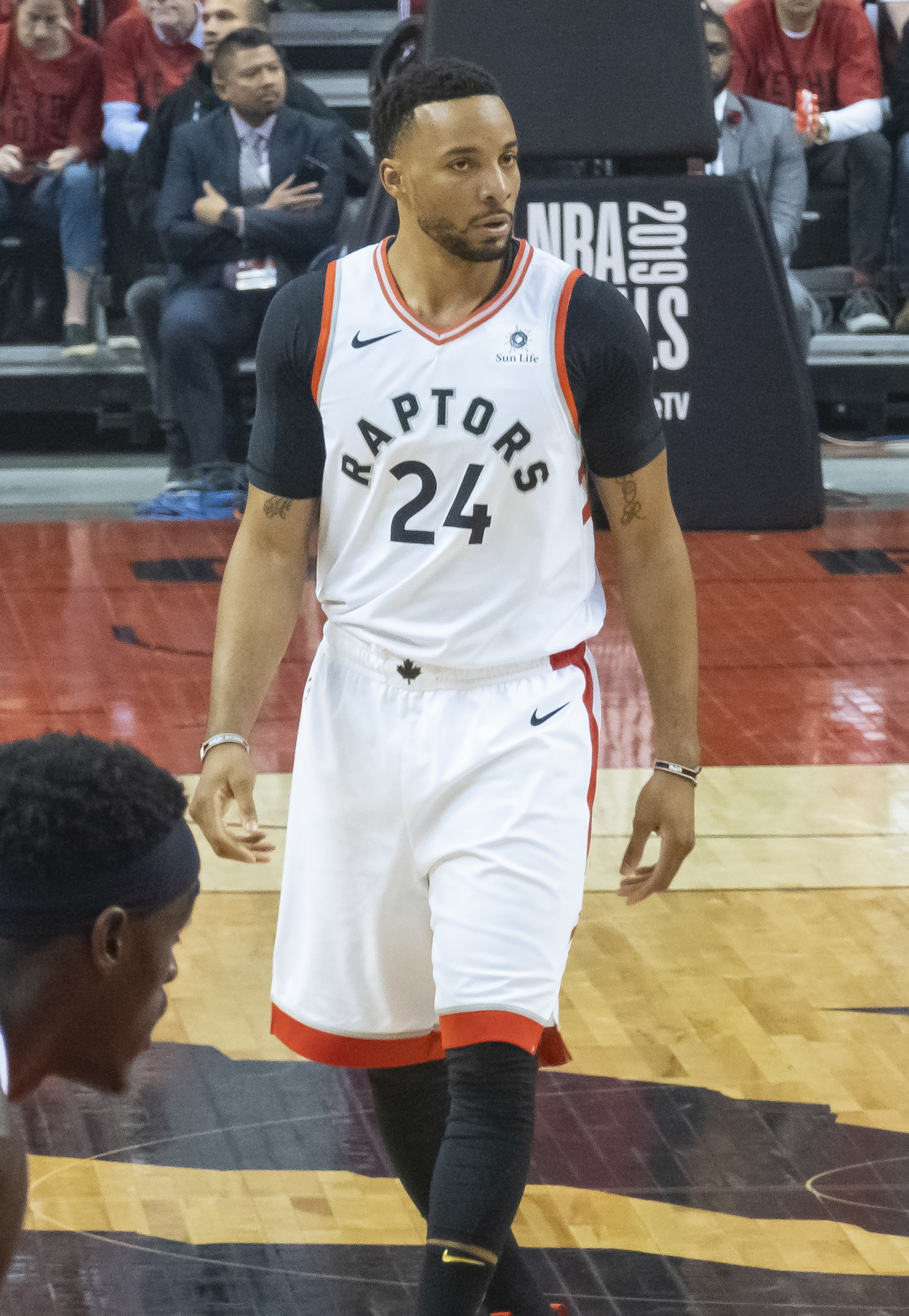
Norman Powell was selected 46th by the Milwaukee Bucks (traded to the Toronto Raptors).

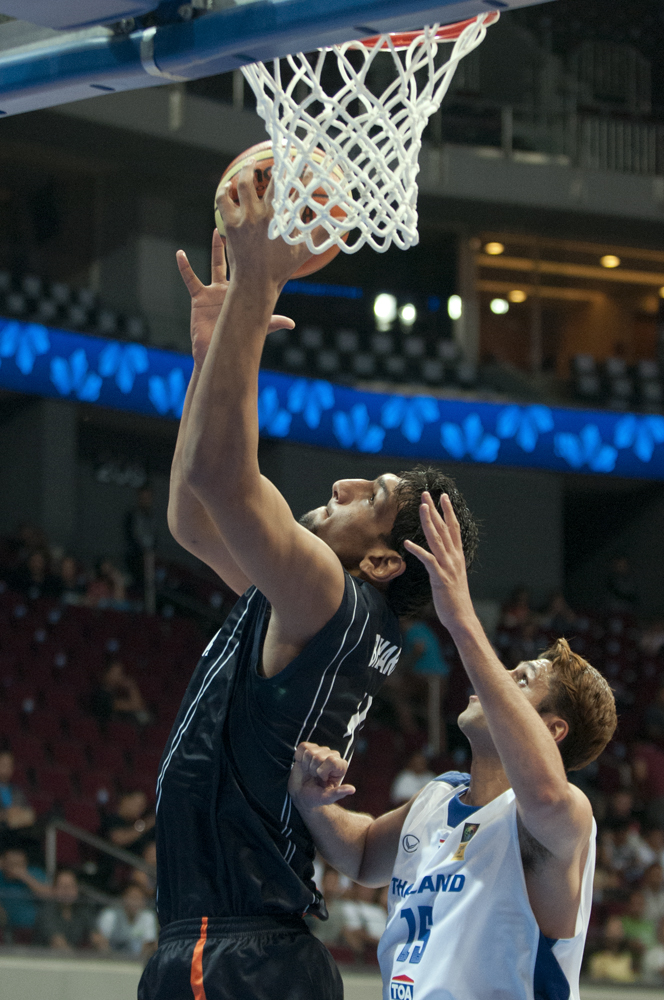
Satnam Singh was selected 52nd by the Dallas Mavericks. Singh became the first Indian-born player to be drafted into the NBA.

Rnd.	Pick	Player	Pos.	Nationality (Note: Nationality indicates the player's national team or representative nationality. If a player has not competed at the international level, then the nationality indicates the national team which the player is eligible to represent according to FIBA rules.)	Team	School / club team
1	1	Karl-Anthony Towns^{*~}	C	Dominican Republic (Note: Karl-Anthony Towns was born and raised in the United States to an American father and a Dominican mother. He has represented the Dominican Republic internationally since 2012.)	Minnesota Timberwolves	Kentucky (Fr.)
1	2	D'Angelo Russell^{+}	PG	United States	Los Angeles Lakers	Ohio State (Fr.)
1	3	Jahlil Okafor	C	United States (Note: Okafor was born in the United States to a Nigerian father. He played for the United States at the junior level but has played for the Nigeria national basketball team since 2020.)	Philadelphia 76ers	Duke (Fr.)
1	4	Kristaps Porziņģis^{+}	PF/C	Latvia	New York Knicks	Baloncesto Sevilla (Spain)
1	5	Mario Hezonja	SG/SF	Croatia	Orlando Magic	FC Barcelona Liga ACB Spain
1	6	Willie Cauley-Stein	PF	United States	Sacramento Kings	Kentucky (Jr.)
1	7	Emmanuel Mudiay	PG	DR Congo (Note: Emmanuel Mudiay was born in the Democratic Republic of the Congo, but he was raised in the United States since age 5. He has not represented either country internationally.)	Denver Nuggets	Guangdong Southern Tigers
1	8	Stanley Johnson	SF	United States	Detroit Pistons	Arizona (Fr.)
1	9	Frank Kaminsky	PF	United States	Charlotte Hornets	Wisconsin (Sr.)
1	10	Justise Winslow	SF	United States	Miami Heat	Duke (Fr.)
1	11	Myles Turner	C	United States	Indiana Pacers	Texas (Fr.)
1	12	Trey Lyles	PF	Canada	Utah Jazz	Kentucky (Fr.)
1	13	Devin Booker^{*}	SG	United States	Phoenix Suns	Kentucky (Fr.)
1	14	Cameron Payne	PG	United States	Oklahoma City Thunder	Murray State (So.)
1	15	Kelly Oubre Jr.	SF	United States	Atlanta Hawks (from Brooklyn Nets (Note: July 11, 2012: Brooklyn Nets to Atlanta Hawks: Atlanta acquired Jordan Farmar, Anthony Morrow, DeShawn Stevenson, Jordan Williams, Johan Petro, a conditional 2013 first-round pick, a 2017 second-round pick, the option to swap 2014 first-round picks and the option to swap 2015 first-round picks; Brooklyn acquired Joe Johnson) traded to Washington) (Note: Washington Wizards and Atlanta Hawks trade: Washington acquired draft rights to 15th pick Kelly Oubre Jr.; Atlanta acquired draft rights to 19th pick Jerian Grant and two future second-round picks)	Kansas (Fr.)
1	16	Terry Rozier	PG	United States	Boston Celtics	Louisville (So.)
1	17	Rashad Vaughn	SG	United States	Milwaukee Bucks	UNLV (Fr.)
1	18	Sam Dekker	SF	United States	Houston Rockets (from New Orleans) (Note: July 15, 2014: New Orleans Pelicans to Houston Rockets (three-team trade with Washington Wizards): Houston acquired Alonzo Gee, Scotty Hopson and a conditional 2015 first-round pick (protected top 3 and 20–30 in 2015) from New Orleans; Houston acquired Trevor Ariza from Washington (sign and trade); New Orleans acquired Ömer Aşık, Omri Casspi and cash considerations from Houston; Washington acquired Melvin Ely from New Orleans)	Wisconsin (Jr.)
1	19	Jerian Grant	PG	United States	Washington Wizards (traded to New York Knicks via Atlanta Hawks) (Note: New York Knicks and Atlanta Hawks trade: New York acquired draft rights to 19th pick Jerian Grant; Atlanta acquired Tim Hardaway Jr.)	Notre Dame (Sr.)
1	20	Delon Wright	PG	United States	Toronto Raptors	Utah (Sr.)
1	21	Justin Anderson	SF	United States	Dallas Mavericks	Virginia (Jr.)
1	22	Bobby Portis	PF	United States	Chicago Bulls	Arkansas (So.)
1	23	Rondae Hollis-Jefferson	SF	United States (Note: Hollis-Jefferson became a naturalized Jordanian citizen in 2023 and plays for the Jordan national basketball team.)	Portland Trail Blazers (traded to Brooklyn) (Note: Brooklyn Nets and Portland Trail Blazers trade: Brooklyn acquired Steve Blake and draft rights to 23rd pick Rondae Hollis-Jefferson; Portland acquired Mason Plumlee and draft rights to 41st pick Pat Connaughton)	Arizona (So.)
1	24	Tyus Jones	PG	United States	Cleveland Cavaliers (traded to Minnesota Timberwolves) (Note: Minnesota Timberwolves and Cleveland Cavaliers trade: Minnesota acquired draft rights to 24th pick Tyus Jones; Cleveland acquired draft rights to 31st pick Cedi Osman, draft rights to 36th pick Rakeem Christmas, and a 2019 second-round pick)	Duke (Fr.)
1	25	Jarell Martin	PF	United States	Memphis Grizzlies	LSU (So.)
1	26	Nikola Milutinov^{#}	C	Serbia	San Antonio Spurs	Partizan Belgrade (Serbia)
1	27	Larry Nance Jr.	PF	United States	Los Angeles Lakers (from Houston Rockets) (Note: July 13, 2014: Houston Rockets to Los Angeles Lakers: L.A. Lakers acquired Jeremy Lin, a conditional 2015 first-round pick (protected top 14 in 2014) and a conditional 2015 second-round pick; Houston acquired draft rights to Sergei Lishouk)	Wyoming (Sr.)
1	28	R. J. Hunter	SG	United States	Boston Celtics (from L.A. Clippers) (Note: June 25, 2013: Los Angeles Clippers to Boston Celtics: Boston acquired a 2015 first-round pick as a compensation for allowing L.A. Clippers to hire Doc Rivers as a head coach)	Georgia State (Jr.)
1	29	Chris McCullough	PF	United States	Brooklyn Nets (from Atlanta Hawks)	Syracuse (Fr.)
1	30	Kevon Looney	PF	United States	Golden State Warriors	UCLA (Fr.)
2	31	Cedi Osman	SF	Turkey (Note: Cedi Osman was born in Macedonia to a Turkish father and Bosnian mother. He moved to Turkey at age 12 and became a naturalized Turkish citizen. He has represented Turkey internationally since 2011.)	Minnesota Timberwolves (traded to Cleveland Cavaliers)	Anadolu Efes (Turkey)
2	32	Montrezl Harrell	PF/C	United States	Houston Rockets (from New York Knicks) (Note: July 11, 2012: New York Knicks to Houston Rockets: New York acquired Marcus Camby (sign and trade); Houston acquired Toney Douglas, Josh Harrellson, Jerome Jordan, a 2014 second-round pick, a 2015 second-round pick and cash considerations)	Louisville (Jr.)
2	33	Jordan Mickey	PF	United States	Boston Celtics (from Philadelphia 76ers via Miami Heat) (Note: June 28, 2012: Philadelphia 76ers to Miami Heat: Miami acquired draft rights to Justin Hamilton and a conditional future first-round pick (protected top 14 in 2013–2015, else 2015 and 2016 second-round picks); Philadelphia acquired draft rights to Arnett Moultrie; January 15, 2014: Miami Heat to Boston Celtics (three-team trade with Golden State Warriors): Boston acquired Joel Anthony, Philadelphia's conditional first-round pick, a 2016 second-round pick from Miami and cash considerations; Miami acquired Toney Douglas from Golden State; Golden State acquired Jordan Crawford and MarShon Brooks from Boston)	LSU (So.)
2	34	Anthony Brown	SF	United States	Los Angeles Lakers	Stanford (Sr.)
2	35	Willy Hernangómez	C	Spain	Philadelphia 76ers (from Orlando Magic (Note: June 26, 2014: Orlando Magic to Philadelphia 76ers: Philadelphia acquired draft rights to Dario Šarić, a future first-round pick and a 2015 second-round pick; Orlando acquired draft rights to Elfrid Payton) traded to New York Knicks) (Note: New York Knicks and Philadelphia 76ers trade: New York acquired draft rights to 35th pick Willy Hernangómez; Philadelphia acquired two future second-round picks and cash considerations)	Baloncesto Sevilla, Spain
2	36	Rakeem Christmas	PF/C	United States	Minnesota Timberwolves (from Sacramento Kings via Houston), (Note: September 17, 2014: Sacramento Kings to Houston Rockets: Houston acquired Jason Terry, a 2015 second-round pick and a 2016 second-round pick; Sacramento acquired Alonzo Gee and Scotty Hopson) (Note: December 19, 2014: Houston Rockets, Minnesota Timberwolves and Philadelphia 76ers three-team trade: Houston acquired Corey Brewer from Minnesota; Houston acquired Alexey Shved from Philadelphia; Minnesota acquired Troy Daniels, Sacramento's 2015 second-round pick, a 2016 second-round pick and cash considerations from Houston; Philadelphia acquired draft rights to Sergei Lishouk and a 2015 second-round pick from Houston; Philadelphia acquired Ronny Turiaf from Minnesota) traded to Cleveland Cavaliers	Syracuse (Sr.)
2	37	Richaun Holmes	PF/C	United States	Philadelphia 76ers (from Denver Nuggets via Houston Rockets, Portland Trail Blazers and Minnesota Timberwolves) (Note: February 22, 2011: Denver Nuggets to Minnesota Timberwolves (three-team trade with New York Knicks): Minnesota acquired a 2015 second-round pick from Denver; Minnesota acquired Anthony Randolph, Eddy Curry and cash considerations from New York; Denver acquired Kosta Koufos from Minnesota; Denver acquired Wilson Chandler, Raymond Felton, Danilo Gallinari, Timofey Mozgov, a 2014 first-round pick, 2012 and 2013 second-round picks, the option to swap 2016 first-round picks, and cash considerations from New York from New York; New York acquired Corey Brewer from Minnesota; New York acquired Carmelo Anthony, Chauncey Billups, Anthony Carter, Renaldo Balkman and Shelden Williams from Denver; June 27, 2011: Minnesota Timberwolves to Portland Trail Blazers: Minnesota acquired draft rights to Tanguy Ngombo; Portland acquired Denver's 2015 second-round pick; July 10, 2013: Portland Trail Blazers to Houston Rockets: Houston acquired draft rights to Kostas Papanikolaou, draft rights to Marko Todorović, Denver's 2015 second-round pick and a 2017 second-round pick; Portland acquired Thomas Robinson; February 19, 2015: Houston Rockets to Philadelphia 76ers: Philadelphia acquired Isaiah Canaan and Denver's 2015 second-round pick; Houston acquired K. J. McDaniels)	Bowling Green (Sr.)
2	38	Darrun Hilliard	SG	United States	Detroit Pistons	Villanova (Sr.)
2	39	Juan Pablo Vaulet^{#}	SF	Argentina	Charlotte Hornets (traded to Brooklyn Nets) (Note: Brooklyn Nets and Charlotte Hornets trade: Brooklyn acquired draft rights to 39th pick Juan Pablo Vaulet; Charlotte acquired a 2018 second-round pick, a 2019 second-round pick, and cash considerations)	Estudiantes de Bahía (Argentina)
2	40	Josh Richardson	SG	United States	Miami Heat	Tennessee (Sr.)
2	41	Pat Connaughton	SG	United States	Brooklyn Nets (Note: December 22, 2011: New Jersey Nets (now Brooklyn Nets) to Utah Jazz: Utah acquired a 2015 second-round pick; New Jersey acquired Mehmet Okur; June 27, 2013: Utah Jazz to Atlanta Hawks: Atlanta acquired Brooklyn's 2015 second-round pick; Utah acquired draft rights to Raulzinho Neto; June 26, 2014: Atlanta Hawks to Milwaukee Bucks: Milwaukee acquired Brooklyn's 2015 second-round pick; Atlanta acquired draft rights to Lamar Patterson; June 30, 2014: Milwaukee Bucks to Brooklyn Nets: Brooklyn re-acquired their 2015 second-round pick and also acquired a 2019 second round pick as a compensation for allowing Milwaukee to hire Jason Kidd as a head coach) (traded to Portland Trail Blazers)	Notre Dame (Sr.)
2	42	Olivier Hanlan^{#}	PG	Canada	Utah Jazz	Boston College (Jr.)
2	43	Joe Young	PG	United States	Indiana Pacers	Oregon (Sr.)
2	44	Andrew Harrison	PG	United States	Phoenix Suns (traded to Memphis) (Note: Memphis Grizzlies and Phoenix Suns trade: Memphis acquired draft rights to 44th pick Andrew Harrison; Phoenix acquired Jon Leuer)	Kentucky (So.)
2	45	Marcus Thornton^{#}	PG	United States	Boston Celtics	William & Mary (Sr.)
2	46	Norman Powell^{+}	SG	United States	Milwaukee Bucks (traded to Toronto Raptors) (Note: Toronto Raptors and Milwaukee Bucks trade: Toronto acquired draft rights to 46th pick Norman Powell and a conditional 2017 first-round pick; Milwaukee acquired Greivis Vásquez)	UCLA (Sr.)
2	47	Artūras Gudaitis^{#}	C	Lithuania	Philadelphia 76ers (from New Orleans via Washington Wizards and Los Angeles Clippers) (Note: December 14, 2011: New Orleans Hornets (now New Orleans Pelicans) to Los Angeles Clippers: L.A. Clippers acquired Chris Paul, a 2015 second-round pick and a future second-round pick; New Orleans acquired Eric Gordon, Chris Kaman, Al-Farouq Aminu, and a 2012 first-round pick; March 15, 2012: Los Angeles Clippers to Washington Wizards (three-team trade with Denver Nuggets): Washington acquired Brian Cook and New Orleans' 2015 second-round pick from L.A. Clippers; Washington acquired Nenê from Denver; L.A. Clippers acquired Nick Young from Washington; Denver acquired JaVale McGee and Ronny Turiaf from Washington; February 20, 2014: Washington Wizards to Philadelphia 76ers (three-team trade with Denver Nuggets): Philadelphia acquired Eric Maynor and New Orleans' 2015 second-round pick from Washington; Philadelphia acquired a 2016 second-round pick from Denver; Washington acquired a conditional 2014 second-round pick from Philadelphia; Washington acquired Andre Miller from Denver; Denver acquired Jan Veselý from Washington)	Žalgiris Kaunas (Lithuania)
2	48	Dakari Johnson	C	United States	Oklahoma City Thunder	Kentucky (So.)
2	49	Aaron White^{#}	PF	United States	Washington Wizards	Iowa (Sr.)
2	50	Marcus Eriksson^{#}	SG	Sweden	Atlanta Hawks (from Toronto Raptors) (Note: June 30, 2014: Toronto Raptors to Atlanta Hawks: Atlanta acquired John Salmons and a 2015 second-round pick; Toronto acquired Louis Williams and draft rights to Lucas Nogueira)	FC Barcelona Liga ACB Spain
2	51	Tyler Harvey^{#}	PG	United States	Orlando Magic (from Chicago Bulls) (Note: July 14, 2014: Chicago Bulls to Orlando Magic: Orlando acquired Anthony Randolph, a 2015 second-round pick, a 2016 second-round pick and cash considerations; Chicago acquired draft rights to Milovan Raković)	Eastern Washington (Jr.)
2	52	Satnam Singh^{#}	C	India	Dallas Mavericks	IMG Academy (Bradenton, Florida; HSPg.)
2	53	Sir'Dominic Pointer^{#}	SF	United States	Cleveland Cavaliers (from Portland Trail Blazers via Chicago Bulls and Denver Nuggets) (Note: June 27, 2013: Portland Trail Blazers to Cleveland Cavaliers: Portland acquired draft rights to Allen Crabbe; Cleveland acquired a 2015 second-round pick and a 2016 second-round pick; January 6, 2014: Cleveland Cavaliers to Chicago Bulls: Cleveland acquired Luol Deng; Chicago acquired Andrew Bynum, Sacramento Kings conditional first-round pick, the option to swap 2015 first-round picks, Portland's 2015 second-round pick and Portland's 2016 second-round pick; June 26, 2014: Chicago Bulls to Denver Nuggets: Chicago acquired Anthony Randolph and draft rights to Doug McDermott; Denver acquired draft rights to Jusuf Nurkić, draft rights to Gary Harris and Portland's 2015 second-round pick; January 7, 2015: Denver Nuggets to Cleveland Cavaliers: Cleveland acquired Timofey Mozgov and Portland's 2015 second-round pick; Denver acquired two conditional first-round picks)	St. John's (Sr.)
2	54	Dani Díez^{#}	SF	Spain	Utah Jazz (from Cleveland Cavaliers, (Note: July 22, 2014: Cleveland Cavaliers to Utah Jazz: Utah acquired Carrick Felix, a 2015 second-round pick and cash considerations; Cleveland acquired John Lucas III, Malcolm Thomas and Erik Murphy) traded to Portland Trail Blazers) (Note: Portland Trail Blazers and Utah Jazz trade: Portland acquired draft rights to 54th pick Dani Díez; Utah acquired cash considerations)	Gipuzkoa Basket (Spain)
2	55	Cady Lalanne^{#}	PF	Haiti	San Antonio Spurs	Massachusetts (Sr.)
2	56	Branden Dawson	SF	United States	New Orleans Pelicans (from Memphis (Note: January 12, 2015: Memphis Grizzlies to New Orleans Pelicans (three-team trade with Boston Celtics): New Orleans acquired Quincy Pondexter and a 2015 second-round pick from Memphis; Memphis acquired Russ Smith from New Orleans; Memphis acquired Jeff Green from Boston; Boston acquired Tayshaun Prince and a conditional first-round pick from Memphis; Boston acquired Austin Rivers from New Orleans), traded to Los Angeles Clippers) (Note: New Orleans Pelicans and Los Angeles Clippers trade: L.A. Clippers acquired draft rights to 56th pick Branden Dawson; New Orleans acquired cash considerations)	Michigan State (Sr.)
2	57	Nikola Radičević^{#}	PG	Serbia	Denver Nuggets (from Los Angeles Clippers) (Note: January 5, 2009: Los Angeles Clippers to Denver Nuggets: Denver acquired a future second-round pick; L.A. Clippers acquired Cheikh Samb and cash considerations)	Baloncesto Sevilla, Spain
2	58	J. P. Tokoto^{#}	SG/SF	United States	Philadelphia 76ers (from Houston Rockets)	North Carolina (Jr.)
2	59	Dimitrios Agravanis^{#}	PF	Greece	Atlanta Hawks	Olympiacos (Greece)
2	60	Luka Mitrović^{#}	PF	Serbia	Philadelphia 76ers (from Golden State Warriors via Indiana Pacers) (Note: December 19, 2011: Golden State Warriors to Indiana Pacers: Indiana acquired Louis Amundson and a second-round pick; Golden State acquired Brandon Rush; February 20, 2014: Indiana Pacers to Philadelphia 76ers: Philadelphia acquired Danny Granger and Golden State's 2015 second-round pick; Indiana acquired Evan Turner and Lavoy Allen)	Red Star Belgrade (Serbia)

== Notable undrafted players ==
These players were not selected in the 2015 NBA draft, but have appeared in at least one regular-season or playoff game in the NBA.

Player	Pos.	Nationality	School/club team
Cliff Alexander	PF	United States	Kansas (Fr.)
Nicolás Brussino	SF/SG	Argentina (Note: Brussino holds dual Argentinian and Italian citizenship. He plays for the Argentina national basketball team.)	Regatas Corrientes (Argentina)
Quinn Cook	PG	United States	Duke (Sr.)
Bryce Dejean-Jones	SG	United States	Iowa State (Sr.)
Duje Dukan	PF	Croatia (Note: Dukan was born in Croatia and raised in the United States. Holding dual citizenship, he plays for the Croatia national basketball team.)	Wisconsin (Sr.)
Michael Frazier II	SG	United States	Florida (Jr.)
Treveon Graham	SG	United States	VCU (Sr.)
Javonte Green	SF/SG	United States	Radford (Sr.)
Aaron Harrison	SG	United States	Kentucky (So.)
William Howard	SG	France	Denain Voltaire (France)
Vince Hunter	SF	United States	UTEP (So.)
Stanton Kidd	SF	United States	Colorado State (Sr.)
T. J. McConnell	PG	United States	Arizona (Sr.)
Alfonzo McKinnie	SF	United States	Green Bay (Sr.)
Malcolm Miller	SF	United States	Holy Cross (Sr.)
Luis Montero	SG	Dominican Republic	Westchester CC (So.)
Maurice Ndour	PF	Senegal	Ohio (Sr.)
J. J. O'Brien	SF/SG	United States	San Diego State (Sr.)
Royce O'Neale	SF	United States	Baylor (Sr.)
Kevin Pangos	PG	Canada (Note: Pangos was born in Canada and is of Slovenian descent. He holds dual citizenship and plays for the Canada national basketball team.)	Gonzaga (Sr.)
Vincent Poirier	C	France	Paris-Levallois (France)
Chasson Randle	PG	United States	Stanford (Sr.)
Jordan Sibert	SG	United States	Dayton (Sr.)
Keifer Sykes	PG	United States	Green Bay (Sr.)
Juan Toscano-Anderson	SF	Mexico (Note: Toscano-Anderson was born in the United States and is of Mexican descent. He holds dual citizenship and plays for the Mexico national basketball team.)	Marquette (Sr.)
Julian Washburn	SF	United States	UTEP (Sr.)
Brianté Weber	PG	United States	VCU (Sr.)
Greg Whittington	PF	United States	Georgetown (So.)
Alan Williams	C/F	United States	UC Santa Barbara (Sr.)
Christian Wood	PF	United States	UNLV (So.)

== Eligibility and entrants ==
The draft was conducted under the eligibility rules established in the league's new 2011 collective bargaining agreement (CBA) with its players union. The CBA that ended the 2011 lockout instituted no immediate changes to the draft, but called for a committee of owners and players to discuss future changes. Since the 2011 CBA, the basic eligibility rules have been:

- All drafted players must be at least 19 years old during the calendar year of the draft. In terms of dates, players eligible for the 2015 draft must be born on or before December 31, 1996.
- Any player who is not an "international player", as defined in the CBA, must be at least one year removed from the graduation of his high school class. The CBA defines "international players" as players who permanently resided outside the United States for three years prior to the draft, did not complete high school in the U.S., and have never enrolled at a U.S. college or university.

=== Early entrants ===
Player who are not automatically eligible must declare their eligibility for the draft by notifying the NBA offices in writing no later than 60 days before the draft. For the 2015 draft, this date fell on April 26. After this date, "early entry" players may attend NBA pre-draft camps and individual team workouts to show off their skills and obtain feedback regarding their draft positions. Under the CBA, a player may withdraw his name from consideration from the draft at any time before the final declaration date, which is 10 days before the draft. Under NCAA rules at that time, players only had until April 16 to withdraw from the draft and maintain their college eligibility. In January 2016, the NCAA changed its draft withdrawal date to 10 days after the end of the annual NBA Draft Combine in May, with the 2016 draft the first to be held under the new rule.

A player who has hired an agent will forfeit his remaining college eligibility, regardless of whether he is drafted. Also, while the CBA allows a player to withdraw from the draft twice, the NCAA then mandated that a player who declared twice lost his college eligibility. The aforementioned 2016 NCAA rule change also allowed players to declare for more than one draft without losing college eligibility.

This year, a total of 48 collegiate players and 43 international players declared as early entry candidates before the April 26 deadline. On June 15, the withdrawal deadline, 34 early entry candidates withdrew from the draft and one early entry candidate is added, leaving 47 collegiate players and 11 international players as the early entry candidates for the draft.

- (United States) Cliff Alexander – F, Kansas (freshman)
- (United States) Justin Anderson – G/F, Virginia (junior)
- (United States) Brandon Ashley – F, Arizona (junior)
- (United States) Devin Booker – G, Kentucky (freshman)
- (United States) Willie Cauley-Stein – F/C, Kentucky (junior)
- (United States) Sam Dekker – F, Wisconsin (junior)
- (United States) Michael Frazier II – G, Florida (junior)
- (Canada) Olivier Hanlan – G, Boston College (junior)
- (United States) Montrezl Harrell – F, Louisville (junior)
- (United States) Aaron Harrison – G, Kentucky (sophomore)
- (United States) Andrew Harrison – G, Kentucky (sophomore)
- (United States) Tyler Harvey – G, Eastern Washington (junior)
- (United States) Rondae Hollis-Jefferson – F, Arizona (sophomore)
- (United States) R.J. Hunter – G, Georgia State (junior)
- (United States) Vince Hunter – C, UTEP (sophomore)
- (United States) Charles Jackson – F, Tennessee Tech (junior)
- (United States) Dakari Johnson – C, Kentucky (sophomore)
- (United States) Stanley Johnson – F, Arizona (freshman)
- (United States) Tyus Jones – G, Duke (freshman)
- (United States) Trevor Lacey – G, NC State (junior)
- (United States) Kevon Looney – C, UCLA (freshman)
- (United States) Trey Lyles – F, Kentucky (freshman)
- (United States) Jarell Martin – F, LSU (sophomore)
- (United States) Chris McCullough – F, Syracuse (freshman)
- (United States) Jordan Mickey – F, LSU (sophomore)
- (Dominican Republic) Luis Montero – F, Westchester CC (sophomore)
- (United States) / (Nigeria) Jahlil Okafor – C, Duke (freshman)
- (United States) Kelly Oubre Jr. – G, Kansas (freshman)
- (United States) Ashton Pankey – F, Manhattan (junior)
- (United States) Cameron Payne – G, Murray State (sophomore)
- (United States) Terran Petteway – G, Nebraska (junior)
- (United States) Bobby Portis – F, Arkansas (sophomore)
- (United States) Michael Qualls – G, Arkansas (junior)
- (United States) Terry Rozier – G, Louisville (sophomore)
- (United States) D'Angelo Russell – G, Ohio State (freshman)
- (India) Satnam Singh – C, IMG Academy (postgraduate)
- (United States) Deonta Stocks – G, West Georgia (sophomore)
- (United States) Jherrod Stiggers – G, Houston (junior)
- (United States) Aaron Thomas – G, Florida State (junior)
- (United States) / (Cameroon) J.P. Tokoto – F, North Carolina (junior)
- (United States) / (Dominican Republic) Karl-Anthony Towns – C, Kentucky (freshman)
- (United States) Myles Turner – C, Texas (freshman)
- (United States) Robert Upshaw – C, Washington (sophomore)
- (United States) Rashad Vaughn – G, UNLV (freshman)
- (United States) Chris Walker – F, Florida (sophomore)
- (United States) Justise Winslow – F, Duke (freshman)
- (United States) Christian Wood – C, UNLV (sophomore)

==== International players ====
- Dimitrios Agravanis – F/C, Olympiacos Piraeus (Greece)
- Willy Hernangómez – F/C, Baloncesto Sevilla (Spain)
- (Croatia) Mario Hezonja – F, FC Barcelona Lassa (Spain)
- Mouhammadou Jaiteh – C, JSF Nanterre (France)
- Lee Jong-hyun – F/C, Korea University (South Korea)
- Nikola Milutinov – C, Partizan Belgrade (Serbia)
- Cedi Osman – F, Anadolu Efes (Turkey)
- (Philippines) Bobby Ray Parks Jr. – G, Hapee Fresh Fighters (PBA D-League)
- (Latvia) Kristaps Porziņģis – C, Baloncesto Sevilla (Spain)
- (Serbia) Nikola Radičević – G, Baloncesto Sevilla (Spain)
- Juan Pablo Vaulet – F, Estudiantes de Bahía (Argentina)
- (Bosnia and Herzegovina) Adin Vrabac – F, TBB Trier (Germany)

=== Automatically eligible entrants ===
Players who do not meet the criteria for "international" players are automatically eligible if they meet any of the following criteria:

- They have completed 4 years of their college eligibility.
- If they graduated from high school in the U.S., but did not enroll in a U.S. college or university, four years have passed since their high school class graduated.
- They have signed a contract with a professional basketball team outside of the NBA, anywhere in the world, and have played under that contract.

Players who meet the criteria for "international" players are automatically eligible if they meet any of the following criteria:

- They are least 22 years old during the calendar year of the draft. In terms of dates, players born on or before December 31, 1993, are automatically eligible for the 2015 draft.
- They have signed a contract with a professional basketball team outside of the NBA within the United States, and have played under that contract.

Based on the eligibility rules, every college seniors who have completed their college eligibility and every "international" players who were born on or before December 31, 1993, are automatically eligible for the draft. However, there are other players who became automatically eligible even though they have not completed their four-year college eligibility.

Other automatically eligible players
Player	Team	Note	Ref.
Isaac Fotu	Bàsquet Manresa (Spain)	Left college in 2014, playing professionally since 2014–15 season	
Jamal Jones	Delaware 87ers (D-League)	Left college in 2014, playing professionally since 2014–15 season	
Todd Mayo	Westchester Knicks (D-League)	Left college in 2014, playing professionally since 2014–15 season	
Emmanuel Mudiay	Guangdong Southern Tigers (China)	Graduated from high school in 2014, playing professionally since 2014–15 season	
Naadir Tharpe	Los Angeles D-Fenders (D-League)	Left college in 2014, playing professionally since 2014–15 season	
Jarvis Threatt	Rio Grande Valley Vipers (D-League)	Left college in 2014, playing professionally since 2014–15 season	

== Combine ==
The invitation-only NBA Draft Combine was scheduled to occur in Chicago from May 12 to 17. The on-court element of the combine was scheduled for May 14 and 15.

== Draft lottery ==
The NBA conducted an annual draft lottery to determine the draft order for the teams that did not make the playoffs in the preceding season. Every NBA team that missed the NBA playoffs had a chance at winning a top three pick, but teams with worse records had a better chance at winning a top three pick. After the lottery selected the teams that receive a top three pick, the other teams received an NBA draft pick based on their winning percentage from the prior season. The table below shows each non-playoff team's chances (based on their record at the end of the NBA season) of receiving picks 1–14.

The 2015 NBA lottery was held on May 19. The Minnesota Timberwolves, who had the worst record in the NBA and the highest chance to win the lottery at 25%, won the lottery. The Los Angeles Lakers moved from the fourth spot to second, while the Philadelphia 76ers got the third pick. The only team that moved down from their original draft position altogether was the New York Knicks, who moved from the projected second pick to the fourth pick.

^	Denotes the actual lottery result

Team	2014–15 record	Lottery chances	Lottery probabilities													
Team	2014–15 record	Lottery chances	1st	2nd	3rd	4th	5th	6th	7th	8th	9th	10th	11th	12th	13th	14th
Minnesota Timberwolves	16–66	250	.250^	.215	.178	.357	—	—	—	—	—	—	—	—	—	—
New York Knicks	17–65	199	.199	.188	.171	.319^	.123	—	—	—	—	—	—	—	—	—
Philadelphia 76ers	18–64	156	.156	.157	.156^	.226	.265	.040	—	—	—	—	—	—	—	—
Los Angeles Lakers	21–61	119	.119	.126^	.133	.099	.351	.160	.012	—	—	—	—	—	—	—
Orlando Magic	25–57	88	.088	.097	.107	—	.261^	.360	.084	.004	—	—	—	—	—	—
Sacramento Kings	29–53	63	.063	.071	.081	—	—	.440^	.305	.040	.001	—	—	—	—	—
Denver Nuggets	30–52	43	.043	.049	.058	—	—	—	.600^	.232	.018	.000	—	—	—	—
Detroit Pistons	32–50	28	.028	.033	.039	—	—	—	—	.724^	.168	.008	.000	—	—	—
Charlotte Hornets	33–49	17	.017	.020	.024	—	—	—	—	—	.813^	.122	.004	.000	—	—
Miami Heat	37–45	11	.011	.013	.016	—	—	—	—	—	—	.870^	.089	.002	.000	—
Indiana Pacers	38–44	8	.008	.009	.012	—	—	—	—	—	—	—	.907^	.063	.001	.000
Utah Jazz	38–44	7	.007	.008	.010	—	—	—	—	—	—	—	—	.935^	.039	.000
Phoenix Suns	39–43	6	.006	.007	.009	—	—	—	—	—	—	—	—	—	.960^	.018
Oklahoma City Thunder	45–37	5	.005	.006	.007	—	—	—	—	—	—	—	—	—	—	.982^

== Draft ceremony ==
In the first round of the NBA draft, each team has up to five minutes to decide which player they would like to select. The team can also propose a trade with another team before making their selection. The NBA commissioner will announce the selection and the player, wearing a basketball cap sporting the team's logo, comes up to the stage to be congratulated and presented to the audience. In the second round, each team has up to two minutes to make their picks while the deputy commissioner assumes the commissioner's role.

The NBA annually invites around 15–20 players to sit in the "green room", a special room set aside at the draft site for the invited players plus their families and agents. When their names are called, the player leaves the room and goes up on stage. Other players who are not invited are allowed to attend the ceremony, sit in the stands with the fans and walk up on stage when (or if) they are drafted. The 19 players who accepted invitations to attend the draft were Devin Booker, Willie Cauley-Stein, Sam Dekker, Jerian Grant, Rondae Hollis-Jefferson, Stanley Johnson, Frank Kaminsky, Kevon Looney, Trey Lyles, Emmanuel Mudiay, Jahlil Okafor, Kelly Oubre Jr., Cameron Payne, Bobby Portis, Kristaps Porziņģis, D'Angelo Russell, Karl-Anthony Towns, Myles Turner, and Justise Winslow. International prospect Mario Hezonja did not attend because he was still involved with his then-team FC Barcelona at the time. Three other players, R.J. Hunter, Tyus Jones, and Delon Wright all had invitations as well, but they declined their invitations for undisclosed reasons.

== Trades involving draft picks ==
=== Pre-draft trades ===
Prior to the day of the draft, the following trades were made and resulted in exchanges of draft picks between the teams.

=== Draft-day trades ===
The following trades involving drafted players were made on the day of the draft.

== See also ==
- List of first overall NBA draft picks
