= Aaron Harrison =

American basketball player (born 1994)

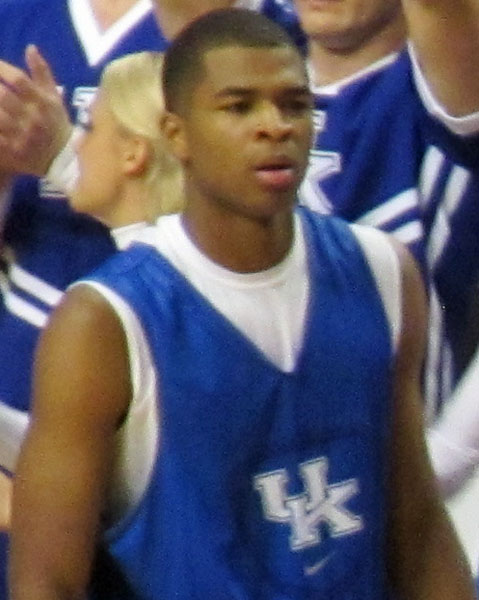
- Harrison in Kentucky's 2013 Blue-White scrimmage

Free agent
- Position: Shooting guard

Personal information
- Born: October 28, 1994 (age 32) San Antonio, Texas, U.S.
- Listed height: 6 ft 6 in (1.98 m)
- Listed weight: 198 lb (90 kg)

Career information
- High school: Travis (Pecan Grove, Texas)
- College: Kentucky (2013–2015)
- NBA draft: 2015: undrafted
- Playing career: 2015–present

Career history
- 2015–2017: Charlotte Hornets
- 2016: →Oklahoma City Blue
- 2016: →Erie BayHawks
- 2016: →Greensboro Swarm
- 2017: Delaware 87ers
- 2017–2018: Reno Bighorns
- 2018: Dallas Mavericks
- 2018–2020: Galatasaray
- 2020–2021: Olympiacos
- 2021–2022: Türk Telekom
- 2022: Cedevita Olimpija
- 2022–2023: Kaohsiung Steelers
- 2023: Capitanes de Arecibo
- 2023: Indios de Mayagüez
- 2023–2024: Porto
- 2024: Diablos Rojos del México
- 2025: Halcones de Ciudad Obregón

Career highlights
- Turkish League All-Star (2020); Portuguese Cup winner (2024); McDonald's All-American (2013); First-team Parade All-American (2013); Texas Mr. Basketball (2013)
- Stats at NBA.com
- Stats at Basketball Reference

Aaron Malik Harrison (born October 28, 1994) is an American professional basketball player for Diablos Rojos del México of the Liga Nacional de Baloncesto Profesional (LNBP). He was considered one of the top high school recruits in 2013 and played college basketball for the University of Kentucky alongside his twin brother Andrew. Harrison played in both the 2013 Jordan Brand Classic, and the 2013 McDonald's All-American Boys Game.

== High school career ==
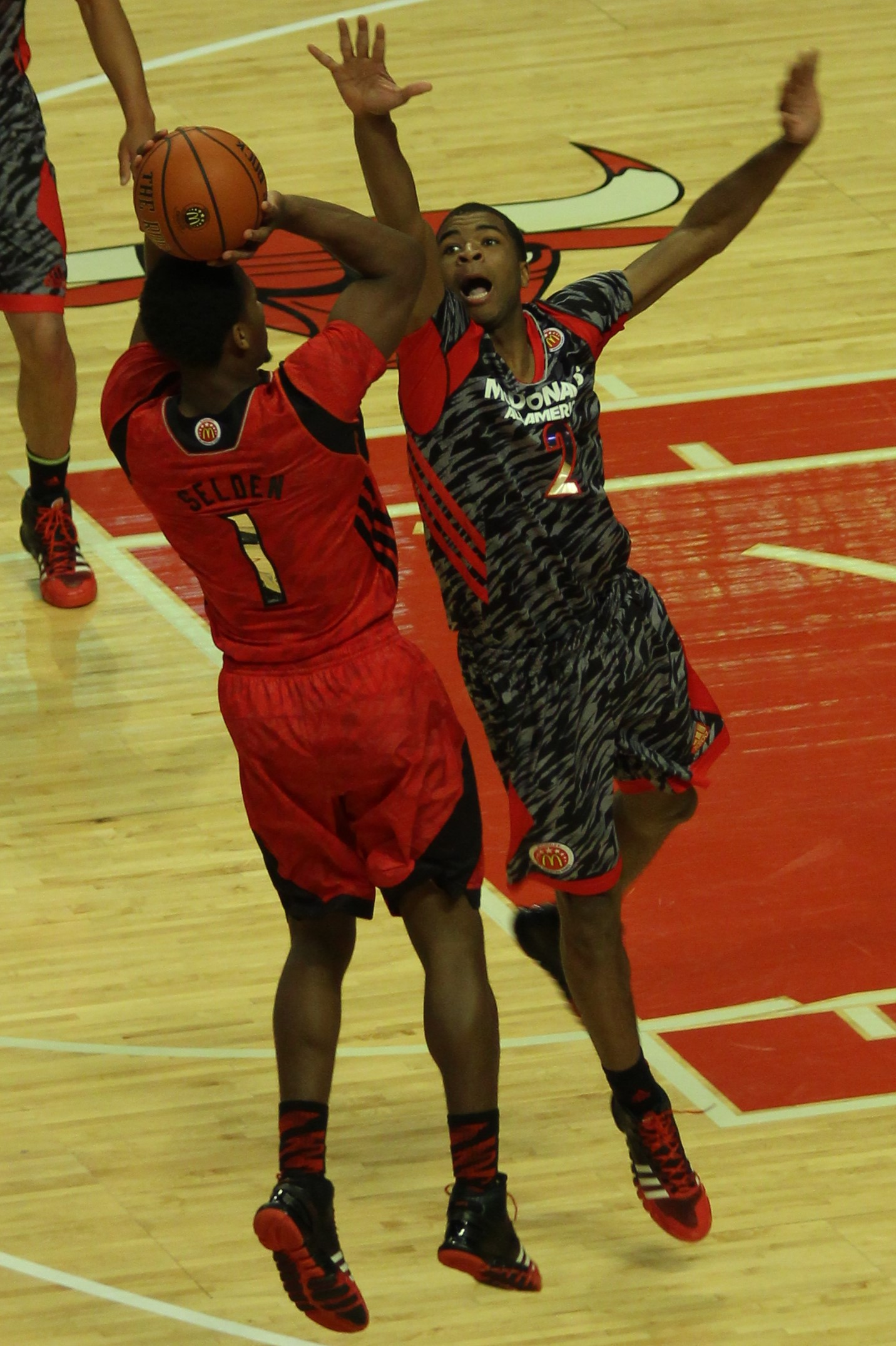
Harrison defending against Wayne Selden in the 2013 McDonald's All-American Boys Game

Harrison was widely regarded as a top five player in the class of 2013 with Andrew Wiggins, Jabari Parker, Julius Randle, and twin brother Andrew. On March 9, 2013, Harrison and his brother, Andrew, helped the Fort Bend Travis Tigers to defeat South Grand Prairie, 46–38 at the Frank Erwin Center on the campus of the University of Texas at Austin to win the Class 5A state title in Texas. They finished #16 in the final ESPN 25 Power Rankings. Fort Bend Travis had lost in the Class 5A state title game the year before to Flower Mound Marcus. He also was the Guy V. Lewis Award winner in 2013.

== College career ==
Harrison started at shooting guard in all 40 games for the University of Kentucky during the 2013–14 season, averaging 13.7 points with 42.3% shooting, 35.6% 3-point shooting, and 79% free throw shooting. He scored a career-high 28 points against Robert Morris on November 17, 2013, all while shooting a perfect 10-of-10 from the free throw line. On March 30, 2014, Harrison hit a game-winning three-point field goal versus Michigan in the regional finals of the 2014 NCAA Men's Division I basketball tournament. On April 5, 2014, Harrison hit a game-winning three-pointer versus Wisconsin in the semi-finals of the 2014 NCAA Division I men's basketball tournament. He finished the game with 8 points, all coming in the second half.

On April 25, 2014, Harrison and his brother both announced via Twitter that they would return to play their sophomore years at the University of Kentucky, instead of entering the 2014 NBA draft.

Prior to the start of the 2014–15 season, Harrison was named the preseason SEC Player of the Year.

On April 9, 2015, Harrison declared for the NBA draft, forgoing his final two years of college eligibility. He was joined alongside his twin brother Andrew and fellow Kentucky teammates Karl-Anthony Towns, Willie Cauley-Stein, Trey Lyles, Devin Booker, and Dakari Johnson.

== Professional career ==
=== Charlotte Hornets (2015–2017) ===
After going undrafted in the 2015 NBA draft, Harrison joined the Charlotte Hornets for the 2015 NBA Summer League. On July 14, 2015, he signed with the Hornets. He made his NBA debut on November 20, 2015, recording one rebound in two minutes of action against the Philadelphia 76ers. In the Hornets' regular season finale on April 13, 2016, Harrison had a season-best game with six points and five rebounds in a 117–103 win over the Orlando Magic. During his rookie season, using the flexible assignment rule, Harrison received multiple assignments to the Oklahoma City Blue and the Erie BayHawks of the NBA Development League.

Over the first two months of the 2016–17 season, Harrison spent much of his time in the D-League with Charlotte's new affiliate, the Greensboro Swarm. On January 3, 2017, he was waived by the Hornets.

=== Greensboro Swarm (2017) ===
On January 15, 2017, Harrison was acquired by the Greensboro Swarm making his debut that day in a 105–95 loss to the Iowa Energy, recording four points, four rebounds and two assists in 17 minutes off the bench.

=== Delaware 87ers (2017) ===
On February 3, 2017, Harrison was traded to the Delaware 87ers in exchange for Cat Barber and the returning player rights to Sam Thompson.

=== Reno Bighorns (2017–2018) ===
On November 3, 2017, Harrison, together with some draft picks, was traded to the Reno Bighorns in exchange for returning player rights to Kendall Marshall and Youssou Ndoye and a draft pick.

=== Dallas Mavericks (2018) ===
On March 22, 2018, Harrison signed a 10-day contract with the Dallas Mavericks and on March 31, after playing four games, he signed with the Mavericks for the rest of the season. He did not receive a qualifying offer from the Mavericks after the season.

=== Galatasaray (2018–2020) ===
On September 5, 2018, Harrison signed with Galatasaray of the Turkish Basketbol Süper Ligi (BSL) and the EuroCup.

On August 7, 2019, Harrison renewed his contract with the Turkish club for two (1+1) more seasons. He averaged 12.8 points, 3.3 rebounds, 3.2 assists, and 1.8 steals per game in 2019–20.

=== Olympiacos (2020–2021) ===
On July 8, 2020, Harrison signed with Greek club Olympiacos of the EuroLeague.

=== Türk Telekom (2021–2022) ===
On July 16, 2021, Harrison signed with Türk Telekom of the Turkish Basketball Super League. Türk Telekom also plays as newcomer in the EuroCup.

=== Cedevita Olimpija (2022) ===
On September 15, 2022, Harrison signed with Cedevita Olimpija of the Slovenian Basketball League.

=== Kaohsiung Steelers (2022–2023) ===
On December 3, 2022, Harrison signed with Kaohsiung Steelers of the P. League+. On February 6, 2023, his contract was terminated.

=== Puerto Rican (2023) ===
On January 24, 2023, Harrison signed with Capitanes de Arecibo of the Baloncesto Superior Nacional (BSN). On April 27, he was replaced by Thomas Robinson. On April 30, he signed with Indios de Mayagüez.

=== FC Porto (2023–2024) ===
On October 12, 2023, Harrison signed with FC Porto of the Liga Portuguesa de Basquetebol (LPB).

=== Diablos Rojos del México (2024) ===
On September 14, 2024, Harrison signed with Diablos Rojos del México of the Liga Nacional de Baloncesto Profesional (LNBP).

== NBA career statistics ==
Legend
GP	Games played	GS	Games started	MPG	Minutes per game
FG%	Field goal percentage	3P%	3-point field goal percentage	FT%	Free throw percentage
RPG	Rebounds per game	APG	Assists per game	SPG	Steals per game
BPG	Blocks per game	PPG	Points per game	**Bold**	Career high

=== Regular season ===
Year	Team	GP	GS	MPG	FG%	3P%	FT%	RPG	APG	SPG	BPG	PPG
2015–16	Charlotte	**21**	0	4.4	.263	**.300**	.417	.7	.1	.3	.0	**.9**
2016–17	Charlotte	5	0	3.4	.000	.000	.500	.6	.6	.0	.0	.2
2017–18	Dallas	9	**3**	**25.9**	**.275**	.209	**.765**	**2.7**	**1.2**	**1.0**	**.2**	**6.7**
Career		35	3	9.8	.261	.218	.613	1.2	.5	.4	.1	2.3

=== Playoffs ===
Year	Team	GP	GS	MPG	FG%	3P%	FT%	RPG	APG	SPG	BPG	PPG
2016	Charlotte	2	0	3.5	.000	.000	.000	.5	.0	.0	.0	.0
Career		2	0	3.5	.000	.000	.000	.5	.0	.0	.0	.0
