= Travis High School =

Public high school in Richmond, Texas

William B. Travis High School

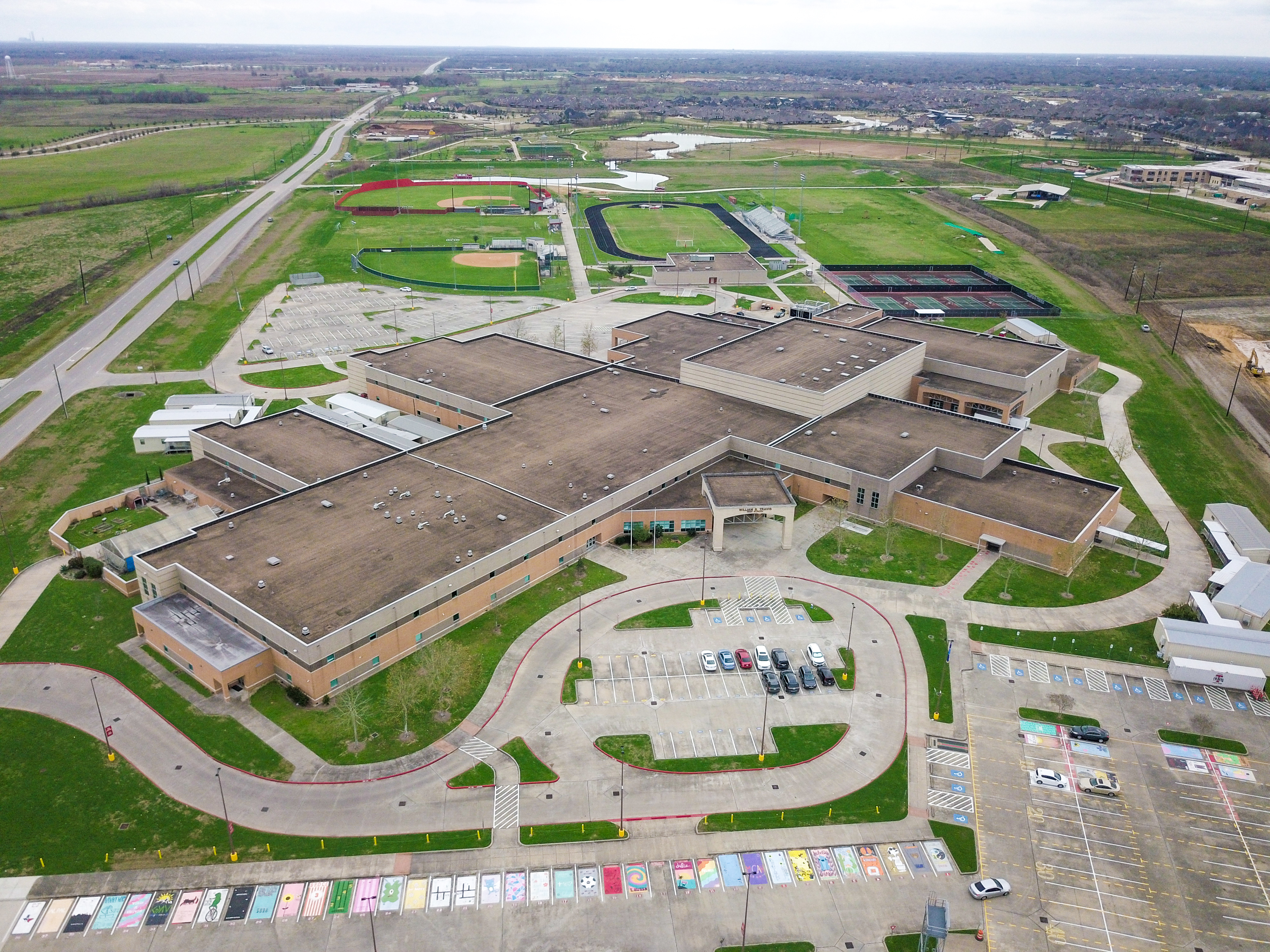

Location
- 11111 Harlem Road; Pecan Grove, Fort Bend County, Texas 77406; United States; 29.6535°N 95.71652°W

Information
- School type: Public high school
- Opened: August 21, 2006
- School district: Fort Bend Independent School District
- NCES District ID: 4819650
- Educational authority: Texas Education Agency
- Superintendent: Marc Smith
- CEEB code: 445848
- NCES School ID: 481965010669
- Principal: Sarah Laberge
- Faculty: 227
- Teaching staff: 161.42 (FTE)
- Grades: 9-12
- Enrollment: 3,142 (2023–2024)
- Student to teacher ratio: 19.46 (FTE)
- Language: English
- Hours in school day: 7.25
- Campus type: Large suburb
- Colors: Scarlet and Gray
- Athletics conference: UIL District 20
- Sports: Baseball; Basketball; Cross country; Football; Golf; Soccer; Softball; Swim; Team tennis; Tennis; Track and field; Volleyball; Water polo
- Mascot: Tiger
- Rival: Austin High School
- Accreditation: Texas Education Agency (TEA)
- Yearbook: Stripes
- Communities served: Aliana Pecan Grove
- Feeder schools: Macario Garcia Middle School James Bowie middle school Crockett Middle School
- TEA Rating: A (2019)
- Website: ths.fortbendisd.gov

William B. Travis High School, known simply as Travis High School, is a public high school in Pecan Grove, Fort Bend County, Texas, United States. Located off Grand Parkway and in Houston's extraterritorial jurisdiction, the school is Fort Bend Independent School District's (FBISD) tenth high school and the largest school by enrollment in the district. Opened in 2006, Travis holds a Richmond, Texas address although the school (nor the district) do not serve any part of the city. The school serves part of Pecan Grove, part of Aliana, and part of New Territory (in addition to the employee residences of the nearby Jester State Prison Farm units). Travis is considered one of the most racially diverse public high schools in the state.

The school's mascot is the tiger and the school colors are scarlet, gray, and white.

Travis hosts two of FBISD's high school academies: the Global Studies Academy (GSA) and the International Business and Marketing Academy (IBMA).

== History ==
Travis High School is named after Texas pioneer William B. Travis. The campus opened on August 21, 2006 and received its dedication on October 15 of the same year. The opening of Travis relieved Austin High School and George Bush High School, with grades 9 and 10 immediately zoned to Travis, and grades 11 to 12 continuing to go to Austin with a phaseout of one grade per year. It became Fort Bend ISD's tenth high school.

In January 2022, more than 200 students at the school signed a petition urging FBISD to close schools in response to rising COVID-19 cases.

In the 2022-2023 school year, district administrators proposed new attendance boundaries to combat overcrowding at the school of more than 3,000 students. The plans include zoning all students from New Territory (which is currently split between Travis and Austin) to only Austin High School, and possibly transferring the two academies the school hosts to another high school in the district such as Kempner High School. The change was approved in February 2023.

The school's student council is known for bringing dogs in for stress relief prior to exam week.

== Campus ==
Travis is located on Harlem Road, off Grand Parkway/SH 99 and surrounded by the Harvest Green neighborhood, a master-planned community by Johnson Development. Directly to the north across Harvest Corner Drive are a number of commercial shops, including Subway and Kung Fu Tea. Additional shops are to the east across Harlem, including an Exxon.

The south half of the campus property contains many athletic facilities, including a turfed football field and track, a baseball field, a softball field, three practice fields, and eight tennis courts, along with a fieldhouse.

For the 2024–25 academic year, Travis High School enrolled 3,114 students, according to the National Center for Education Statistics. The school employed 165.73 full-time equivalent educators, resulting in a student to teacher ratio of 18.79∶1.

Enrollment by race and ethnicity (2024–25)
Race and ethnicity^{†}	Enrolled pupils	Percentage
African American	906	29.09%
Asian	904	29.03%
Hispanic	605	19.43%
Native American	9	0.29%
White	572	18.37%
Native Hawaiian, Pacific islander	9	0.29%
Multi-race	109	3.5%
Total	3,114	100%
^{†} "Hispanic" includes Hispanics of any race. All other categories refer to non-Hispanics.

Enrollment by gender (2024–25)
Gender	Enrolled pupils	Percentage
Female	1,592	51.12%
Male	1,522	48.88%
Non-binary	0	0%
Total	3,114	100%

Enrollment by grade (2024–25)
Grade	Enrolled pupils	Percentage
9	791	25.4%
10	808	25.95%
11	742	23.83%
12	773	24.82%
Ungraded	0	0%
Total	3,114	100%

== Athletics ==
Travis, as well as all other high schools in the district, have teams represented in every UIL sport except for wrestling. In the 2012-2013 school year, Travis was the UIL 5A basketball state champion.

The school contains a competitive Marine Corps JROTC Program, containing Armed and Unarmed Drill teams. Their honor guard has been featured in many events, like Houston Dynamo games.

== Feeder patterns ==
The attendance boundary of the school include Pecan Grove, Aliana, New Territory, and the employee residences of some of the nearby Jester State Prison Farm units.

The following elementary schools feed into Travis:

- Brazos Bend Elementary
- Neill Elementary
- Pecan Grove Elementary
- Oakland Elementary
- Patterson Elementary (partial)
- Madden Elementary (partial)
- Malala Elementary (partial)

The following middle schools feed into Travis:

- Sartartia Middle School (partial)
- James Bowie Middle School
- Garcia Middle School (partial)

Under proposed changes, Brazos Bend Elementary and Sartartia Middle School would no longer feed into Travis, and some areas may attend Crockett Middle School instead of Bowie Middle School (but remain zoned to Travis.

== Notable alumni ==
- Fuzzy Benas — gymnast, member of the United States men's national artistic gymnastics team
- Hakeem Butler — wide receiver for the St. Louis Battlehawks, receiver for Iowa State
- Queen Egbo — WNBA player
- Aaron Harrison — shooting guard for the University of Kentucky, NBA player for Delaware 87ers
- Andrew Harrison — point guard for the University of Kentucky, NBA player for the Cleveland Cavaliers
- Justin Hill — basketball player University of Georgia
- Steven Sims Jr. — wide receiver and return specialist for the Houston Texans, receiver for the University of Kansas
- Parker Washington — wide receiver for the Jacksonville Jaguars, receiver for Penn State
