= Andrew Harrison (basketball) =

American basketball player (born 1994)

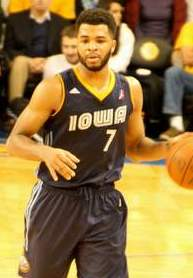
- Harrison with the Iowa Energy in 2016

No. 19 – Santos del Potosí
- Position: Point guard / shooting guard
- League: LNBP

Personal information
- Born: October 28, 1994 (age 32) San Antonio, Texas, U.S.
- Listed height: 6 ft 6 in (1.98 m)
- Listed weight: 213 lb (97 kg)

Career information
- High school: Travis (Pecan Grove, Texas)
- College: Kentucky (2013–2015)
- NBA draft: 2015: 2nd round, 44th overall pick
- Drafted by: Phoenix Suns
- Playing career: 2015–present

Career history
- 2015–2016: Iowa Energy
- 2016–2018: Memphis Grizzlies
- 2018: Cleveland Cavaliers
- 2018–2019: New Orleans Pelicans
- 2019: Khimki
- 2019–2020: Santa Cruz Warriors
- 2020–2021: Beijing Royal Fighters
- 2022: Windy City Bulls
- 2022–2023: Merkezefendi
- 2023–2024: PAOK Thessaloniki
- 2024: Yalovaspor
- 2025: Pioneros de Los Mochis
- 2026: Mitteldeutscher BC
- 2026–present: Santos del Potosí

Career highlights
- McDonald's All-American (2013)
- Stats at NBA.com
- Stats at Basketball Reference

Andrew Michael Harrison (born October 28, 1994) is an American professional basketball player for Mitteldeutscher BC of the Basketball Bundesliga. He was considered one of the top recruits for 2013. He attended Travis High School in Richmond, Texas, and played college basketball for the University of Kentucky along with his twin brother, Aaron Harrison.

== High school career ==
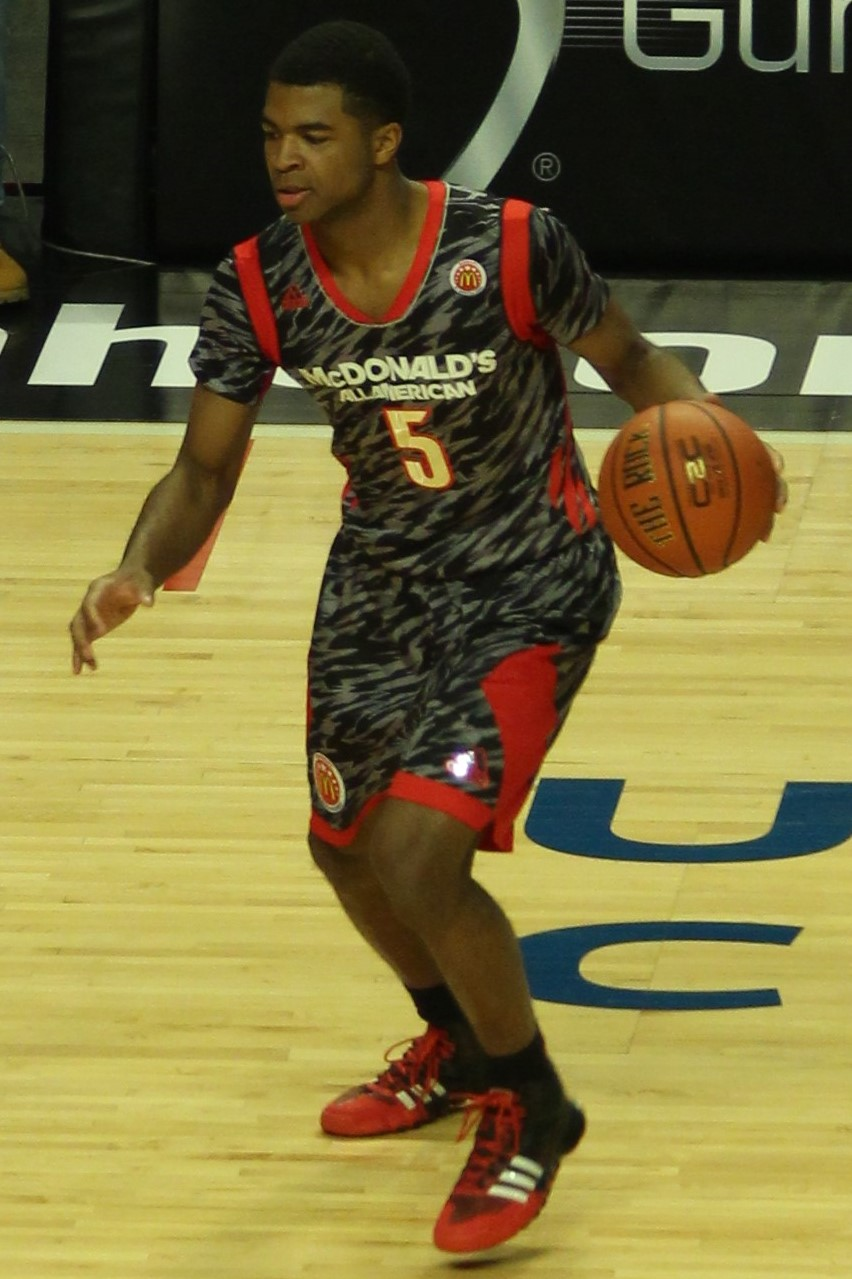
Harrison in the 2013 McDonald's All-American Boys Game

Harrison was widely regarded as a top-five player in the class of 2013 with Andrew Wiggins, Jabari Parker, Julius Randle, and twin brother Aaron. On March 9, 2013, Harrison helped the Fort Bend Travis Tigers defeat South Grand Prairie 46–38 to win the Class 5A state title in Texas. The Tigers finished #16 in the final ESPN 25 Power Rankings. Fort Bend Travis had lost in the Class 5A state title game the year before to Flower Mound Marcus.

Harrison played in both the 2013 Jordan Brand Classic and the 2013 McDonald's All-American Boys Game.

== College career ==
In his two-year career at Kentucky, Harrison averaged 10.1 points, 2.7 rebounds and 3.8 assists in 79 games. Harrison and his brother, Aaron, helped lead Kentucky to successive Final Fours in 2014 and 2015, but came up empty-handed both times after losing in the 2014 title game to Connecticut and 2015 the semi-finals to Wisconsin.

On April 9, 2015, Harrison declared for the NBA draft, forgoing his final two years of college eligibility. He was joined alongside his twin brother Aaron and fellow Kentucky teammates Karl-Anthony Towns, Willie Cauley-Stein, Trey Lyles, Devin Booker, and Dakari Johnson.

== Professional career ==
=== Iowa Energy (2015–2016) ===
On June 25, 2015, Harrison was selected with the 44th overall pick by the Phoenix Suns in the 2015 NBA draft. His rights were then traded to the Memphis Grizzlies in exchange for Jon Leuer. He joined the Grizzlies for the 2015 NBA Summer League and averaged 5.4 points, 2.0 rebounds and 3.0 assists in five games. On October 31, 2015, he was acquired by the Iowa Energy of the NBA Development League, the affiliate team of the Grizzlies. He made his professional debut for the Energy on November 14 in a 98–95 win over the Sioux Falls Skyforce, recording 11 points and seven assists in 29 minutes. On February 16, 2016, he scored a season-high 36 points in a 115–105 loss to the Canton Charge. In 46 games for Iowa in 2015–16, he averaged 18.5 points, 4.3 rebounds, 4.9 assists and 1.5 steals per game.

=== Memphis Grizzlies (2016–2018) ===
After re-joining the Memphis Grizzlies for the 2016 NBA Summer League, Harrison signed a multi-year deal with the team on July 12, 2016. On November 30, 2016, he scored a then career-high 21 points in a 120–105 loss to the Toronto Raptors. He made his debut in the NBA playoffs on April 15, 2017, scoring 10 points in just under 20 minutes off the bench in a 111–82 loss to the San Antonio Spurs.

On February 7, 2018, Harrison scored a career-high 23 points in a 92–88 loss to the Utah Jazz. A week later, he set a new career high with 28 points in a 121–114 loss to the Oklahoma City Thunder. Harrison missed nine games in March 2018 due to a right wrist injury.

On November 1, 2018, Harrison was waived by the Grizzlies.

=== Cleveland Cavaliers (2018) ===
On November 9, 2018, Harrison signed a two-way contract with the Cleveland Cavaliers. He was waived by the Cavaliers on December 2, 2018.

=== New Orleans Pelicans (2018–2019) ===
On December 5, 2018, Harrison signed a two-way contract with the New Orleans Pelicans. He was waived by the Pelicans on January 8, 2019.

=== Khimki (2019) ===
On February 27, 2019, Harrison signed with Russian club Khimki for the rest of the 2018–19 season.

=== Santa Cruz Warriors (2019–2020) ===
On September 5, 2019, Harrison signed with the Golden State Warriors. On October 19, 2019, the Warriors released Harrison. He ultimately landed on the roster of the Warriors' G League affiliate, the Santa Cruz Warriors. He averaged 15.5 points, 5.1 assists, 3.8 rebounds and 1.2 steals per game.

=== Beijing Royal Fighters (2020–2021) ===
After his stint with the Santa Cruz Warriors, Harrison signed with the Chinese team Beijing Royal Fighters. In his first game, he recorded 11 points and 5 rebounds in a winning effort against the Qingdao Eagles.

=== Windy City Bulls (2022) ===
On January 10, 2022, Harrison was traded from the Santa Cruz Warriors to the Windy City Bulls. However, he was waived on February 10 after a season-ending injury.

=== Merkezefendi Belediyesi Denizli Basket (2022–2023) ===
On July 31, 2022, he signed with Merkezefendi Bld. Denizli Basket of the Turkish Basketball Super League (BSL).

=== PAOK Thessaloniki (2023–2024) ===
On July 30, 2023, Harrison signed with Greek club PAOK Thessaloniki. On February 6, 2024, he mutually parted ways with the team.

=== Yalovaspor (2024) ===
On February 6, 2024, he signed with Yalovaspor of the Türkiye Basketbol Ligi (TBL).

=== Mitteldeutscher BC (2026–present) ===
On January 19, 2026, he signed with Mitteldeutscher BC of the Basketball Bundesliga (BBL).

== NBA career statistics ==
Legend
GP	Games played	GS	Games started	MPG	Minutes per game
FG%	Field goal percentage	3P%	3-point field goal percentage	FT%	Free throw percentage
RPG	Rebounds per game	APG	Assists per game	SPG	Steals per game
BPG	Blocks per game	PPG	Points per game	**Bold**	Career high

=== Regular season ===
Year	Team	GP	GS	MPG	FG%	3P%	FT%	RPG	APG	SPG	BPG	PPG
2016–17	Memphis	**72**	18	20.5	.325	.276	.763	1.9	2.8	**.7**	.3	5.9
2017–18	Memphis	56	**46**	**23.7**	.422	**.331**	.780	**2.3**	**3.2**	**.7**	**.5**	**9.5**
2018–19	Memphis	1	0	5.0	**.500**	.000	.000	.0	.0	.0	.0	2.0
2018–19	Cleveland	10	0	14.4	.308	.214	**1.000**	1.5	1.7	.4	.2	4.3
Career		139	64	21.2	.375	.297	.780	2.0	2.8	.7	.4	7.2

=== Playoffs ===
Year	Team	GP	GS	MPG	FG%	3P%	FT%	RPG	APG	SPG	BPG	PPG
2017	Memphis	6	0	19.8	.448	.385	.889	1.8	2.2	.5	.2	6.5
Career		6	0	19.8	.448	.385	.889	1.8	2.2	.5	.2	6.5
