= Pecan Grove, Texas =

- Census-designated place
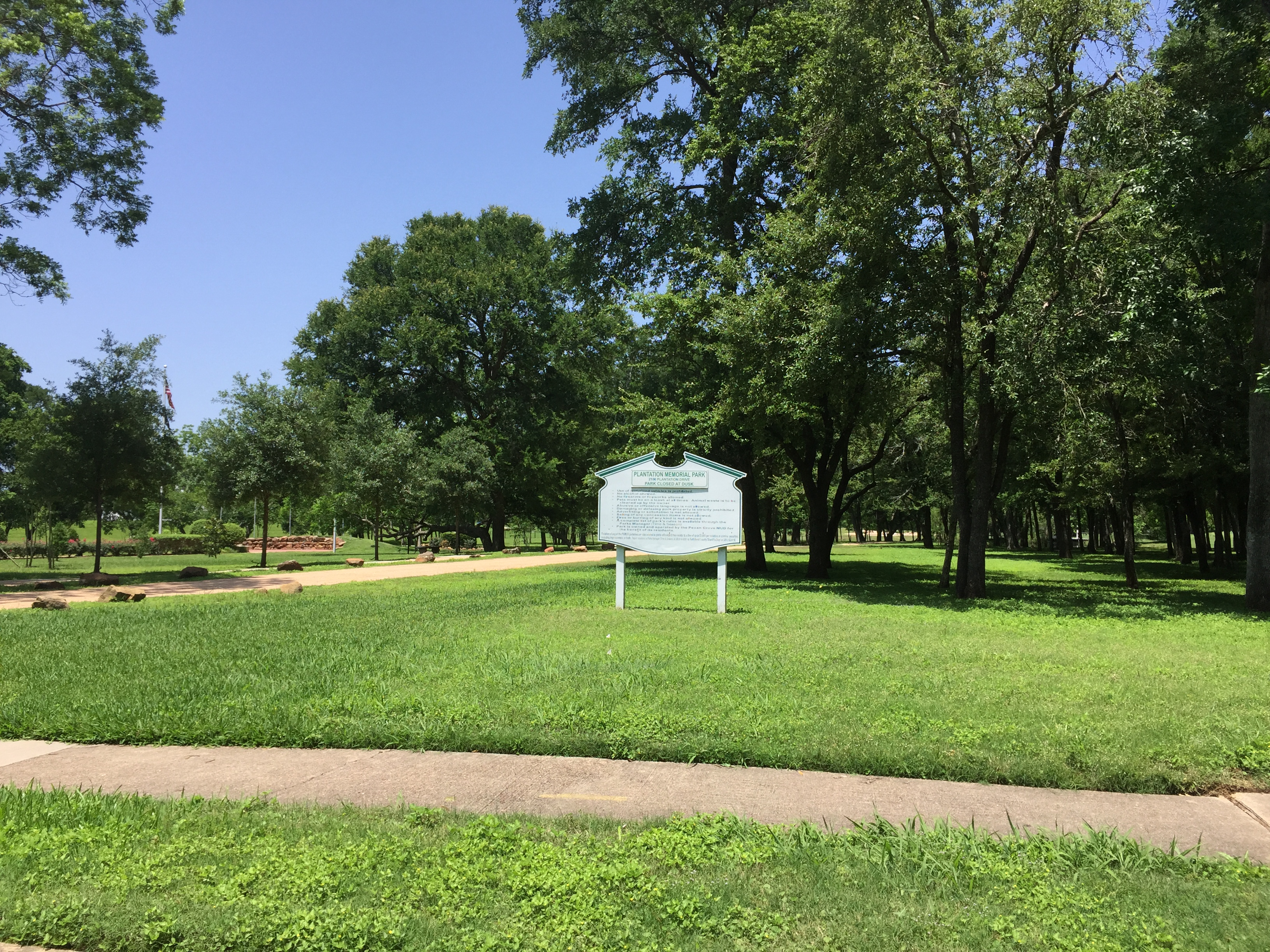
- Plantation Memorial Park in Pecan Grove

- Coordinates: 29°37′33″N 95°43′53″W
- Country: United States
- State: Texas
- County: Fort Bend

Area
  - Total: 8.8 sq mi (22.9 km^{2})
  - Land: 8.7 sq mi (22.5 km^{2})
  - Water: 0.15 sq mi (0.4 km^{2})
- Elevation: 82 ft (25 m)

Population (2020)
  - Total: 22,782
  - Density: 1,834/sq mi (708.3/km^{2})
- Time zone: UTC-6 (Central (CST))
  - Summer (DST): UTC-5 (CDT)
- ZIP code: 77406
- FIPS code: 48-56482
- GNIS feature ID: 1867561

Pecan Grove is a census-designated place and master-planned community within the extraterritorial jurisdictions of Houston and Richmond in Fort Bend County, Texas, United States. The population was 22,782 at the 2020 census.

== Geography ==
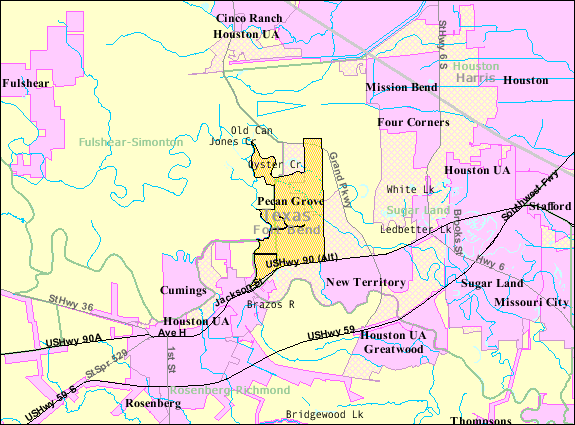
Map of Pecan Grove

Pecan Grove is located northeast of the center of Fort Bend County at 29°37′34″N 95°43′54″W (29.626060, -95.731591). It is bordered to the southwest by the Brazos River. The city limits of Richmond forms a convoluted pattern in the southern part of the CDP, and the northern part is bordered by an exclave of the city of Houston. Downtown Richmond is 4 miles (6 km) southwest of the center of Pecan Grove, and downtown Houston is 29 miles (47 km) to the northeast.

According to the United States Census Bureau, the Pecan Grove CDP has a total area of 8.8 square miles (22.9 km^{2}), of which 8.7 square miles (22.5 km^{2}) is land and 0.2 square miles (0.4 km^{2}), or 1.69%, is water.

== Demographics ==
Historical population
Census	Pop.	Note	%±
1990	9,502		—
2000	13,551		42.6%
2010	15,963		17.8%
2020	22,782		42.7%
U.S. Decennial Census; 1850–1900 1910; 1920 1930 1940; 1950 1960 1970; 1980 1990 2000; 2010

Pecan Grove first appeared as a census designated place in the 1990 U.S. census.

=== Racial and ethnic composition ===
Pecan Grove CDP, Texas – Racial and ethnic composition Note: the US Census treats Hispanic/Latino as an ethnic category. This table excludes Latinos from the racial categories and assigns them to a separate category. Hispanics/Latinos may be of any race.
Race / Ethnicity (NH = Non-Hispanic)	Pop 2000	Pop 2010	Pop 2020	% 2000	% 2010	% 2020
White alone (NH)	11,548	12,160	12,397	85.22%	76.18%	54.42%
Black or African American alone (NH)	444	997	2,801	3.28%	6.25%	12.29%
Native American or Alaska Native alone (NH)	22	25	31	0.16%	0.16%	0.14%
Asian alone (NH)	176	311	2,295	1.30%	1.95%	10.07%
Native Hawaiian or Pacific Islander alone (NH)	0	0	12	0.00%	0.00%	0.05%
Other race alone (NH)	14	28	129	0.10%	0.18%	0.57%
Mixed race or Multiracial (NH)	117	189	958	0.86%	1.18%	4.21%
Hispanic or Latino (any race)	1,230	2,253	4,159	9.08%	14.11%	18.26%
Total	13,551	15,963	22,782	100.00%	100.00%	100.00%

=== 2020 census ===
As of the 2020 census, Pecan Grove had a population of 22,782. The median age was 38.0 years. 25.7% of residents were under the age of 18 and 13.6% of residents were 65 years of age or older. For every 100 females there were 95.5 males, and for every 100 females age 18 and over there were 91.5 males age 18 and over.

99.9% of residents lived in urban areas, while 0.1% lived in rural areas.

There were 7,830 households in Pecan Grove, including 5,485 families; 41.1% had children under the age of 18 living in them. Of all households, 67.8% were married-couple households, 9.9% were households with a male householder and no spouse or partner present, and 19.1% were households with a female householder and no spouse or partner present. About 15.2% of all households were made up of individuals and 5.7% had someone living alone who was 65 years of age or older.

There were 8,186 housing units, of which 4.3% were vacant. The homeowner vacancy rate was 2.4% and the rental vacancy rate was 6.2%.

Racial composition as of the 2020 census
Race	Number	Percent
White	13,427	58.9%
Black or African American	2,857	12.5%
American Indian and Alaska Native	61	0.3%
Asian	2,327	10.2%
Native Hawaiian and Other Pacific Islander	13	0.1%
Some other race	1,053	4.6%
Two or more races	3,044	13.4%
Hispanic or Latino (of any race)	4,159	18.3%

=== 2000 census ===
As of the census of 2000, there were 13,551 people, 4,516 households, and 3,847 families residing in the CDP. The population density was 1,552.2 inhabitants per square mile (599.3/km^{2}). There were 4,662 housing units at an average density of 534.0 per square mile (206.2/km^{2}). The racial makeup of the CDP was 91.29% White, 3.29% African American, 0.19% Native American, 1.34% Asian, 2.51% from other races, and 1.38% from two or more races. Hispanic or Latino of any race were 9.08% of the population.

There were 4,516 households, out of which 52.5% had children under the age of 18 living with them, 76.3% were married couples living together, 7.0% had a female householder with no husband present, and 14.8% were non-families. 12.8% of all households were made up of individuals, and 2.7% had someone living alone who was 65 years of age or older. The average household size was 3.00 and the average family size was 3.29.

In the CDP, the population was spread out, with 33.4% under the age of 18, 5.3% from 18 to 24, 31.9% from 25 to 44, 24.6% from 45 to 64, and 4.8% who were 65 years of age or older. The median age was 35 years. For every 100 females, there were 98.3 males. For every 100 females age 18 and over, there were 95.8 males.

The median income for a household in the CDP was $83,515, and the median income for a family was $91,059. Males had a median income of $62,213 versus $37,658 for females. The per capita income for the CDP was $33,816. About 0.6% of families and 1.3% of the population were below the poverty line, including 0.5% of those under age 18 and 2.2% of those age 65 or over.

== Government and infrastructure ==
Pecan Grove Volunteer Fire Station #1 is in the CDP, and Pecan Grove Volunteer Fire Station #2 is adjacent to the CDP. Additionally, the City of Richmond maintains its Fire Station #3 adjacent to the CDP.

A portion of the Texas Department of Criminal Justice Jester State Prison Farm property is located in Pecan Grove.

Fort Bend County does not have a hospital district. OakBend Medical Center serves as the county's charity hospital which the county contracts with.

== Education ==
=== Fort Bend Independent School District ===
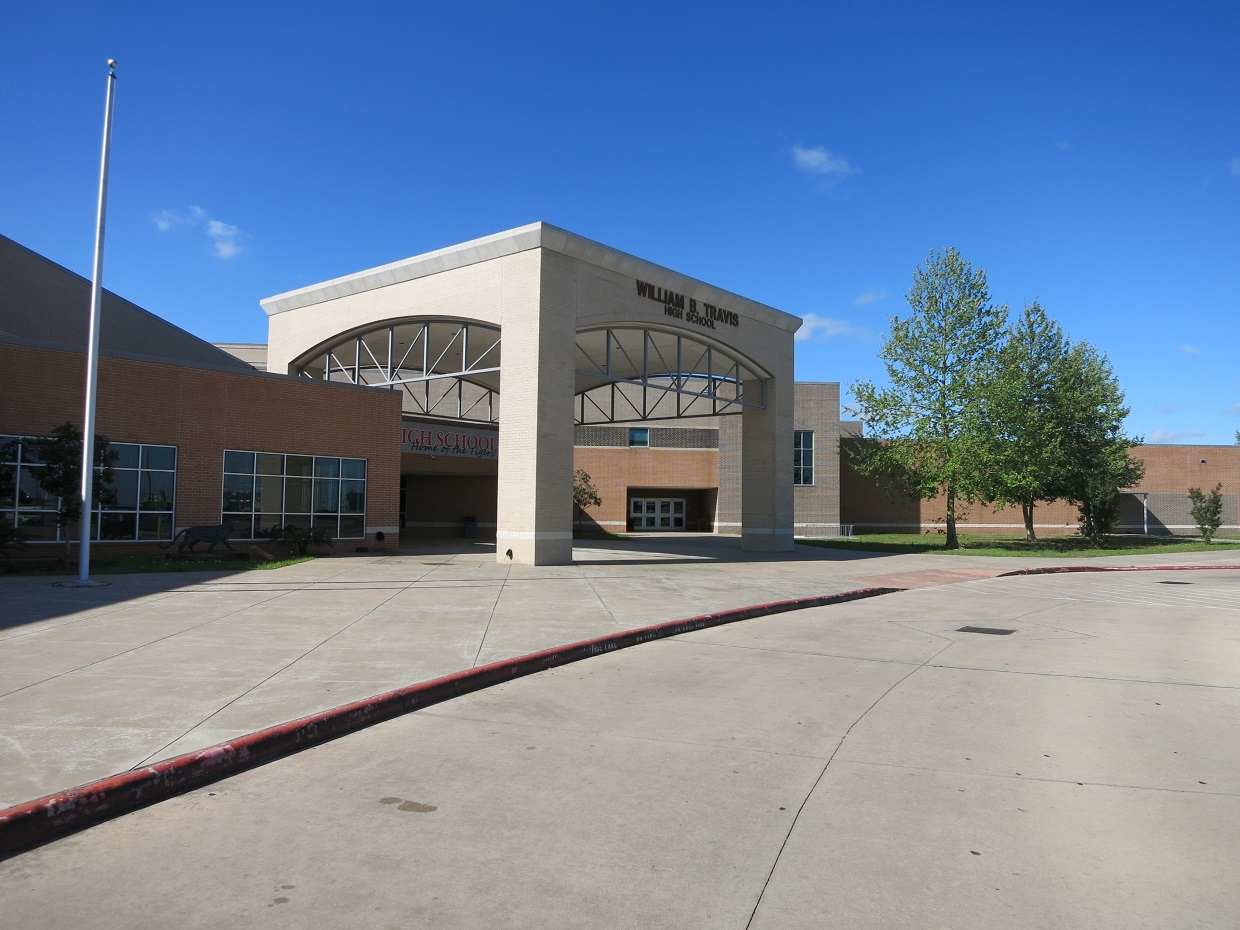
Travis High School

Most of the students who live in Pecan Grove are zoned to Fort Bend Independent School District (FBISD) schools. The Fort Bend ISD attendance zones for Pecan Grove are:

- Pecan Grove Elementary (Grades PK-5), located in Pecan Grove
- Oakland Elementary School (Grades PK-5) - It was scheduled to open in 2006–2007, and it took territory previously assigned to Pecan Grove Elementary.
- Neill Elementary (Grades PK-5), located adjacent to Travis in Pecan Grove

Secondary schools:

- James Bowie Middle School (Grades 6–8), located in Pecan Grove
- Travis High School (Grades 9–12), located in Pecan Grove

Previously students were divided between Garcia and Hodges Bend middle schools. Bowie Middle School opened in August 2011.

Prior to fall 2006 students were divided between Austin High School and George Bush High School. At the time of the rezoning, the present 11th and 12th graders remained at Austin and Bush, while 9th and 10th graders were immediately rezoned; the Travis zoning was phased in each year. Neill opened in 2017, taking territory from Oakland ES and Pecan Grove ES.

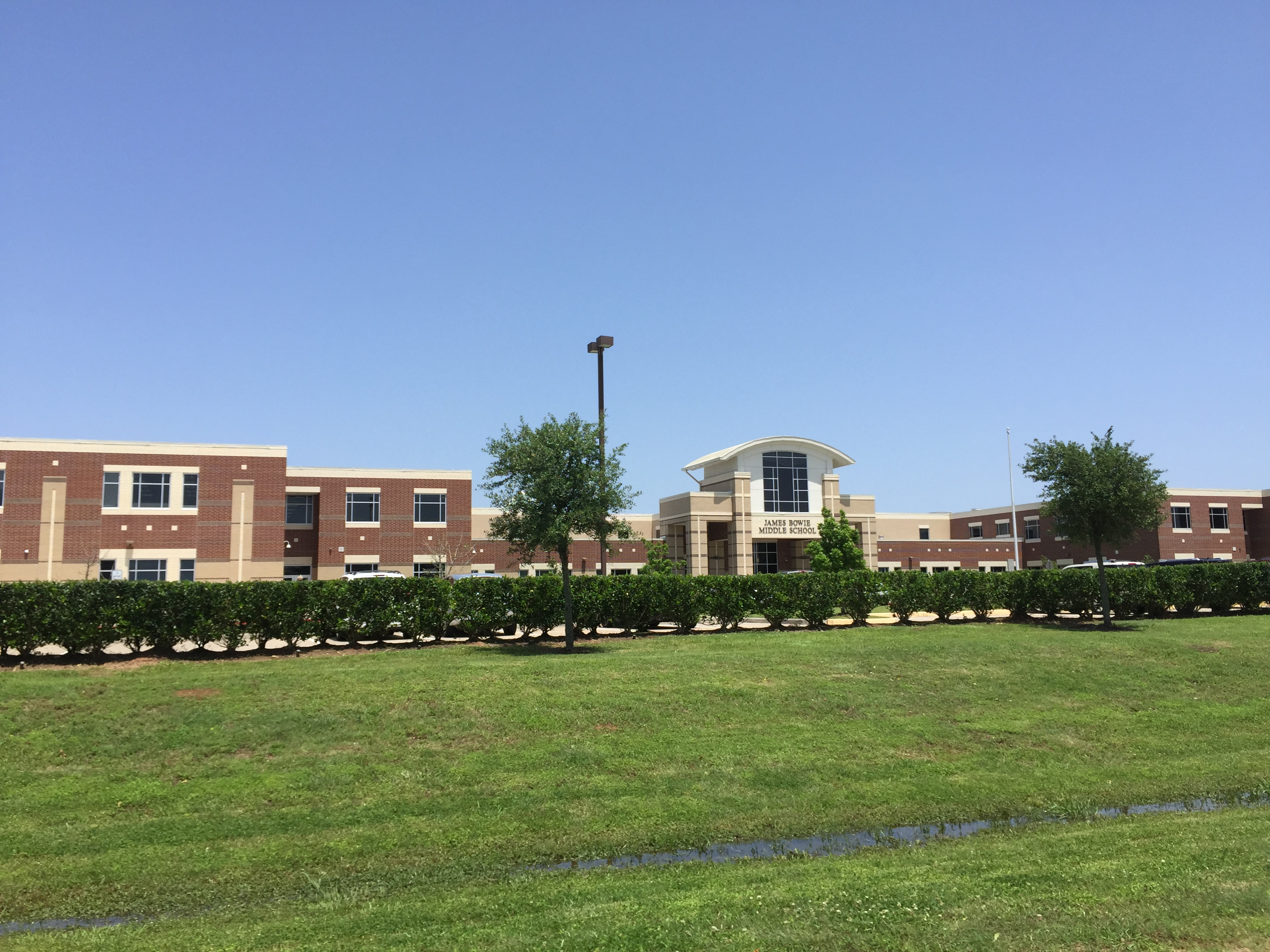
Bowie Middle School

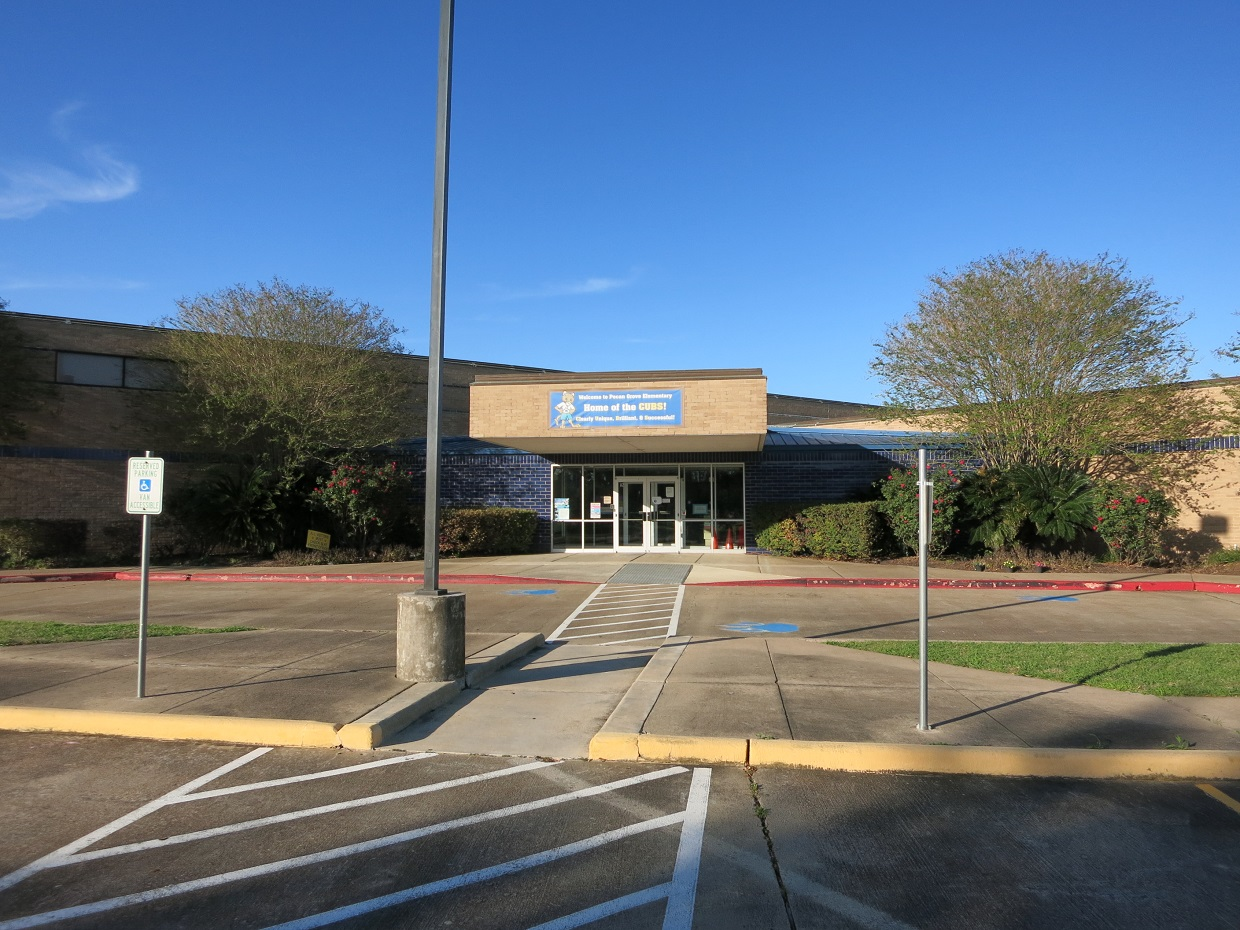
Pecan Grove Elementary School

=== Lamar Consolidated Independent School District ===
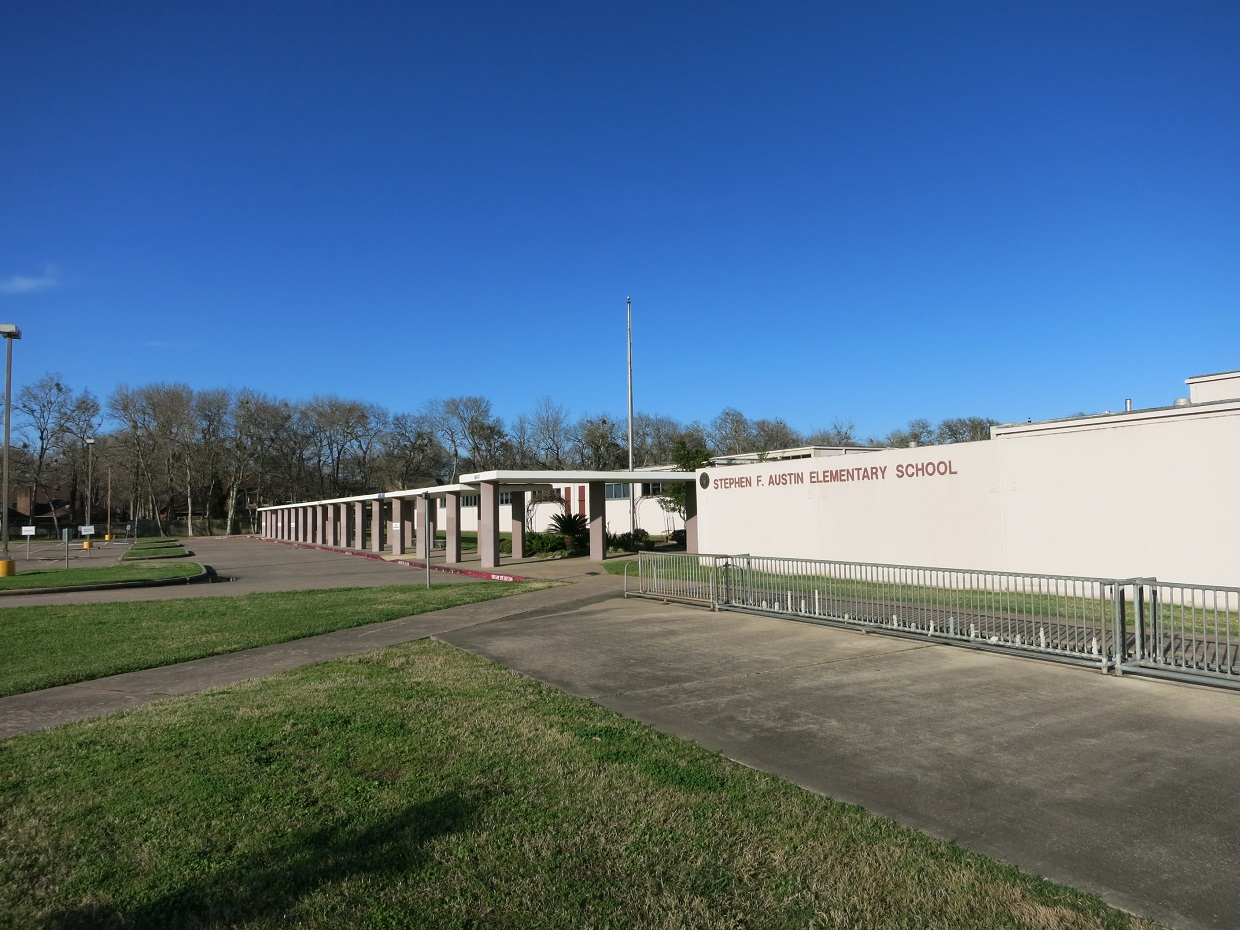
Austin Elementary School

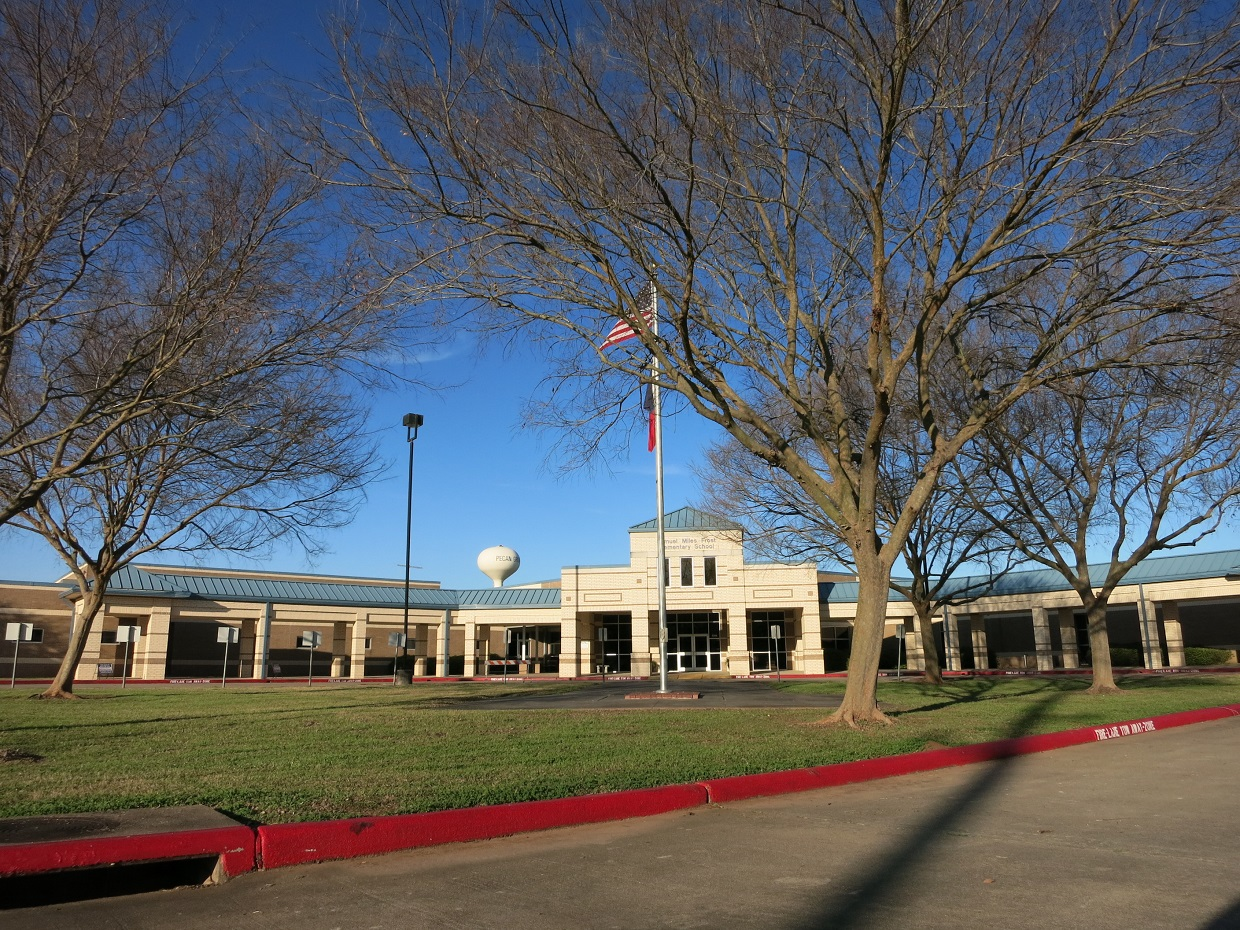
Frost Elementary School

Other students who live in Pecan Grove area are zoned to Lamar Consolidated Independent School District (LCISD) Schools.

Students zoned to Austin Elementary use the following feeder pattern:

- Austin Elementary (Grades PK-5) - In the CDP
- Wessendorff Middle School (Grade 6)
- Lamar Junior High (Grades 7–8)
- Lamar Consolidated High School (Grades 9–12)

Students zoned to Frost Elementary use the following feeder pattern:

- Frost Elementary (Grades PK-5) - In the CDP
- Wertheimer Middle School (Grade 6)
- Briscoe Junior High (Grades 7–8)
- Foster High School (Grades 9–12)

Foster previously served all of LCISD Pecan Grove.

=== Community colleges ===
The designated community college for LCISD is Wharton County Junior College.

The Texas Legislature specifies that the Houston Community College (HCC) boundary includes "the part of the Fort Bend Independent School District that is not located in the service area of the Wharton County Junior College District and that is adjacent to the Houston Community College System District." Wharton College's boundary within FBISD is defined only as the City of Sugar Land and the ETJ of Sugar Land, and FBISD Pecan Grove is not in the Sugar Land ETJ. FBISD Pecan Grove is in HCC.

== Notable people ==
- W. A. Criswell, two-term president of the Southern Baptist Convention
- Frank Beard, drummer and songwriter for the rock band ZZ Top
