= 2026 Basketball Champions League Asia – East =

Tournament details
- Dates: March 27 – May 24, 2026
- Teams: 7

Final positions
- Champions: (Hong Kong) South China
- Runners-up: (Chinese Taipei) Taoyuan Pauian Pilots
- Third place: (Mongolia) Chinggis Broncos
- Fourth place: (Indonesia) Dewa United Banten

Tournament statistics
- MVP: Glen Yang (South China)

Official website
- 2026 Basketball Champions League Asia – East

The 2026 Basketball Champions League Asia – East (BCL Asia – East) was the qualification tournament for the 2026 Basketball Champions League Asia. The tournament involved teams from the East Asia (EABA) and Southeast Asia (SEABA) sub-zones of FIBA Asia. The games were held on March 27 to May 24, 2026, and two teams advanced to the 2026 Basketball Champions League Asia. On September 3, the FIBA announced that 2026 Basketball Champions League Asia was cancelled.

== Entrant teams ==
The seven teams participated in the following games.

Teams in the 2026 BCL Asia – East
Association	Team	Domestic league standings
Chinese Taipei (2)	Taoyuan Pauian Pilots	2024–25 P. League+ champion
Chinese Taipei (2)	New Taipei Kings	2024–25 Taiwan Professional Basketball League champion
Indonesia (1)	Dewa United Banten	2025 Indonesian Basketball League champion
Malaysia (1)	Johor Southern Tigers	2024–25 Major Basketball League Malaysia champion
Thailand (1)	Hi-Tech	2025 Basketball Thai League champion
Mongolia (1)	Chinggis Broncos (Note: Ulaanbaatar Xac Broncos participated the tournament as Chinggis Broncos.)	2024–25 The League champion
Hong Kong (1)	South China	2024–25 Hong Kong A1 Division Championship champion

== Group stage ==
The seven teams were divided to A (South East) and B (East) groups for the group stage. The top three teams from each group advanced to the Final 6.

=== Group A ===
Pos	Team	Pld	W	L	PF	PA	PD	Pts	Qualification
1	(Indonesia) Dewa United Banten	6	4	2	547	520	+27	10	Advance to Final 6
2	(Thailand) Hi-Tech	6	3	3	543	552	−9	9	Advance to Final 6
3	(Malaysia) Johor Southern Tigers	6	2	4	505	523	−18	8	Advance to Final 6

Source: FIBA

27 March	Dewa United Banten (Indonesia)	97–77	(Thailand) Hi-Tech	Tangerang
19:00 (WIB)	Scoring by quarter: 17–22, 24–15, 25–22, 31–18
	Pts: Gillenwater 31; Rebs: Ibarra 11; Asts: Cooper 19	Boxscore	Pts: Freeman 20; Rebs: Jakrawan 12; Asts: Jaimsawad 7	Arena: Dewa United Arena; Attendance: 890; Referees: Leong Chuen Wing (SGP), Yuen Chun Yip (HKG), Aaron Rey Cañete (PHI)

28 March	Hi-Tech (Thailand)	90–80(OT)	(Malaysia) Johor Southern Tigers	Tangerang
19:00 (WIB)	Scoring by quarter: 22–19, 16–15, 19–23, 13–13, Overtime: 20–10
	Pts: Freeman 21; Rebs: Freeman 16; Asts: Jakrawan 6	Boxscore	Pts: Hill 24; Rebs: Geramipoor 10; Asts: Hill, Lewis 4	Arena: Dewa United Arena; Attendance: 300; Referees: Leong Chuen Wing (SGP), Rakesh Ramalingaiah (IND), Aaron Rey Cañete (PHI)

29 March	Johor Southern Tigers (Malaysia)	79–91	(Indonesia) Dewa United Banten	Tangerang
19:00 (WIB)	Scoring by quarter: 30–21, 15–17, 14–30, 20–23
	Pts: Lewis 29; Rebs: Hill 11; Asts: Ting 8	Boxscore	Pts: Gillenwater 29; Rebs: Ibarra 12; Asts: Cooper 12	Arena: Dewa United Arena; Attendance: 1,335; Referees: Yuen Chun Yip (HKG), Leong Chuen Wing (SGP), Rakesh Ramalingaiah (IND)

15 April	Dewa United Banten (Indonesia)	99–94(OT)	(Thailand) Hi-Tech	Johor
20:30 (MST)	Scoring by quarter: 17–14, 28–15, 21–21, 19–35, Overtime: 14–9
	Pts: Gillenwater 35; Rebs: Ibarra 19; Asts: Cooper 14	Boxscore	Pts: Lish 24; Rebs: Ejesu, Jakrawan 6 Asts: Jaimsawad 4	Arena: Arena Larkin Indoor Stadium; Attendance: 500; Referees: Lee Kyoung-Hwan (KOR), Yana Nikogossyan (KAZ), Cheong Chee Keong (SGP)

16 April	Johor Southern Tigers (Malaysia)	90–87	(Indonesia) Dewa United Banten	Johor
20:30 (MST)	Scoring by quarter: 37–18, 19–36, 16–14, 18–19
	Pts: Lewis 30; Rebs: Geramipoor 6 Asts: Hill 5	Boxscore	Pts: Saputra 19; Rebs: Nikolas 9 Asts: Cooper 13	Arena: Arena Larkin Indoor Stadium; Attendance: 2,550; Referees: Chuang Chih-Chun (TPE), Lee Kyoung-Hwan (KOR), Cheong Chee Keong (SGP)

17 April	Hi-Tech (Thailand)	91–89	(Malaysia) Johor Southern Tigers	Johor
20:30 (MST)	Scoring by quarter: 18–25, 24–16, 20–20, 29–28
	Pts: Lish 16; Rebs: Freeman 9 Asts: Jakrawan 4	Boxscore	Pts: Geramipoor 23; Rebs: Ting 9 Asts: Hill 5	Arena: Arena Larkin Indoor Stadium; Attendance: 4,924; Referees: Lee Kyoung-Hwan (KOR), Chuang Chih-Chun (TPE), Yana Nikogossyan (KAZ)

30 April	Johor Southern Tigers (Malaysia)	83–70	(Indonesia) Dewa United Banten	Bangkok
17:00 (ICT)	Scoring by quarter: 20–28, 20–21, 29–10, 14–11
	Pts: Lewis 28; Rebs: M. Lee 13; Asts: Hill 9	Boxscore	Pts: Ibarra 27; Rebs: Ibarra 21; Asts: Cooper 13	Arena: Nimibutr Stadium; Attendance: 130; Referees: Alexey Stepanenko (KAZ), Leong Chuen Wing (SGP), Lê Phạm Trung Kiên (VIE)

1 May	Dewa United Banten (Indonesia)	103–97	(Thailand) Hi-Tech	Bangkok
17:00 (ICT)	Scoring by quarter: 29–24, 21–24, 25–25, 28–24
	Pts: Gillenwater 25; Rebs: Ibarra 14; Asts: Cooper 14	Boxscore	Pts: Fields 34; Rebs: Fields 10; Asts: Lish, Diaby 7	Arena: Nimibutr Stadium; Attendance: 1,275; Referees: Yuen Chun Yip (HKG), Alexey Stepanenko (KAZ), Lê Phạm Trung Kiên (VIE)

2 May	Hi-Tech (Thailand)	94–84	(Malaysia) Johor Southern Tigers	Bangkok
17:00 (ICT)	Scoring by quarter: 23–25, 28–15, 15–26, 28–18
	Pts: Fields 19; Rebs: Fields 8 Asts: three players 5	Boxscore	Pts: Lewis 23; Rebs: M. Lee 14; Asts: Lewis 6	Arena: Nimibutr Stadium; Attendance: 1,184; Referees: Leong Chuen Wing (SGP), Yuen Chun Yip (HKG), Alexey Stepanenko (KAZ)

=== Group B ===
Pos	Team	Pld	W	L	PF	PA	PD	Pts	Qualification
1	(Chinese Taipei) Taoyuan Pauian Pilots	6	6	0	548	461	+87	12	Advance to Final 6
2	(Mongolia) Chinggis Broncos	6	2	4	514	487	+27	8	Advance to Final 6
3	(Hong Kong) South China	6	2	4	528	537	−9	8	Advance to Final 6
4	(Chinese Taipei) New Taipei Kings	6	2	4	492	597	−105	8	

Source: FIBA

6 April	South China (Hong Kong)	84–86	(Mongolia) Chinggis Broncos	Hong Kong
20:00 (HKT)	Scoring by quarter: 20–20, 23–16, 24–21, 17–29
	Pts: Davenport 20; Rebs: Davenport 13; Asts: Davenport 6	Boxscore	Pts: Miller 27; Rebs: Tshimanga 13; Asts: Barsbold 5	Arena: Southorn Stadium; Attendance: 1,800; Referees: Preeda Muongmee (THA), Cheon Kam-Jae (KOR), Ong Jin Leong (SGP)

7 April	South China (Hong Kong)	103–82	(Chinese Taipei) New Taipei Kings	Hong Kong
20:00 (HKT)	Scoring by quarter: 29–24, 27–16, 21–14, 26–28
	Pts: Andela 22; Rebs: Andela 13; Asts: Gilbert 8	Boxscore	Pts: Gardner 31; Rebs: Tolbert 10; Asts: Su P., Lin Y. 5	Arena: Southorn Stadium; Attendance: 2,000; Referees: Cheon Kam-Jae (KOR), Chan Owe Shiong (MAS), Ong Jin Leong (SGP)

9 April	South China (Hong Kong)	76–79	(Chinese Taipei) Taoyuan Pauian Pilots	Hong Kong
20:00 (HKT)	Scoring by quarter: 21–21, 27–21, 13–26, 15–11
	Pts: Davenport 17; Rebs: Andela, Gilbert 12; Asts: Gilbert 5	Boxscore	Pts: Artino 22; Rebs: Artino 15; Asts: Artino 7	Arena: Southorn Stadium; Attendance: 2,000; Referees: Chan Owe Shiong (MAS), Preeda Muongmee (THA), Cheon Kam-Jae (KOR)

14 April	Taoyuan Pauian Pilots (Chinese Taipei)	110–85	(Chinese Taipei) New Taipei Kings	Taipei City
19:00 (TST)	Scoring by quarter: 27–23, 38–11, 21–23, 24–28
	Pts: Millner 31; Rebs: Brown, Artino 13; Asts: Chen C. 9	Boxscore	Pts: Harris 28; Rebs: Tolbert 7 Asts: three players 3	Arena: University of Taipei, Tian-Mu Campus Gymnasium; Attendance: 927; Referees: Nattapong Jontapa (THA), Budi Marfan (INA), Hum Zhung Liang (MAS)

16 April	Taoyuan Pauian Pilots (Chinese Taipei)	99–80	(Hong Kong) South China	Taipei City
19:00 (TST)	Scoring by quarter: 32–14, 23–27, 20–22, 24–17
	Pts: Artino 19; Rebs: Artino 14; Asts: Chen C., Brown 5	Boxscore	Pts: Yang 20; Rebs: Andela 14; Asts: Yang, Tsang 4	Arena: University of Taipei, Tian-Mu Campus Gymnasium; Attendance: 511; Referees: Alexey Stepanenko (KAZ), Nattapong Jontapa (THA), Hum Zhung Liang (MAS)

18 April	New Taipei Kings (Chinese Taipei)	107–99	(Hong Kong) South China	Taipei City
17:00 (TST)	Scoring by quarter: 30–25, 22–19, 29–26, 26–29
	Pts: Harris 34; Rebs: Tolbert 6 Asts: Harris 7	Boxscore	Pts: Andela 26; Rebs: Andela 12; Asts: Yang 9	Arena: University of Taipei, Tian-Mu Campus Gymnasium; Attendance: 509; Referees: Budi Marfan (INA), Alexey Stepanenko (KAZ), Nattapong Jontapa (THA)

19 April	New Taipei Kings (Chinese Taipei)	80–79	(Mongolia) Chinggis Broncos	Taipei City
17:00 (TST)	Scoring by quarter: 27–17, 21–24, 23–16, 9–22
	Pts: Gardner 26; Rebs: Tolbert 15; Asts: Harris 11	Boxscore	Pts: Tshimanga 27; Rebs: Tshimanga 12; Asts: Miller 9	Arena: University of Taipei, Tian-Mu Campus Gymnasium; Attendance: 536; Referees: Alexey Stepanenko (KAZ), Preeda Muongmee (THA), Hum Zhung Liang (MAS)

21 April	Taoyuan Pauian Pilots (Chinese Taipei)	82–78	(Mongolia) Chinggis Broncos	Taipei City
19:00 (TST)	Scoring by quarter: 26–25, 20–18, 18–25, 18–10
	Pts: Brown 23; Rebs: Millner 7 Asts: Brown 6	Boxscore	Pts: Miller 21; Rebs: Azbayar 13; Asts: Barsbold, Azbayar 4	Arena: University of Taipei, Tian-Mu Campus Gymnasium; Attendance: 459; Referees: Preeda Muongmee (THA), Nattapong Jontapa (THA), Alexey Stepanenko (KAZ)

26 April	New Taipei Kings (Chinese Taipei)	63–98	(Chinese Taipei) Taoyuan Pauian Pilots	New Taipei City
17:00 (TST)	Scoring by quarter: 20–28, 11–26, 18–22, 14–22
	Pts: Gardner 18; Rebs: Tolbert 10; Asts: Lin Y. 7	Boxscore	Pts: Millner 30; Rebs: Artino 14; Asts: Millner 5	Arena: Xinzhuang Gymnasium; Attendance: 1,559; Referees: Daigo Urushima (JPN), Glenn Cornelio (PHI), Lee Seung-Mu (KOR)

5 May	Chinggis Broncos (Mongolia)	84–86	(Hong Kong) South China	Ulaanbaatar
19:00 (ULAT)	Scoring by quarter: 30–21, 20–22, 23–14, 11–29
	Pts: Tshimanga 18; Rebs: Tshimanga 14; Asts: Barsbold 8	Boxscore	Pts: Davenport 27; Rebs: Davenport 14; Asts: three players 5	Arena: M bank Arena; Attendance: 897; Referees: Anton Kozlov (KAZ), Suebpong Wichaiphin (THA), Lim Wee Chun (MAS)

7 May	Chinggis Broncos (Mongolia)	79–80	(Chinese Taipei) Taoyuan Pauian Pilots	Ulaanbaatar
19:00 (ULAT)	Scoring by quarter: 27–23, 20–21, 23–10, 9–26
	Pts: Lemon 22; Rebs: Tshimanga 10; Asts: Lemon 9	Boxscore	Pts: Artino 20; Rebs: Artino 17; Asts: Millner 4	Arena: M bank Arena; Attendance: 1,006; Referees: Suebpong Wichaiphin (THA), Lee Kyoung-Hwan (KOR), Lim Wee Chun (MAS)

8 May	Chinggis Broncos (Mongolia)	108–75	(Chinese Taipei) New Taipei Kings	Ulaanbaatar
19:00 (ULAT)	Scoring by quarter: 33–16, 27–14, 30–22, 18–23
	Pts: Lemon 26; Rebs: Tshimanga 15; Asts: Barsbold 11	Boxscore	Pts: Su P. 18; Rebs: Lin C. 7 Asts: Su P. 5	Arena: M bank Arena; Attendance: 1,172; Referees: Lee Kyoung-Hwan (KOR), Anton Kozlov (KAZ), Suebpong Wichaiphin (THA)

== Final 6 ==
The six teams were divided into two groups of three teams each for the Final 6. The top two teams from each group advanced to the semifinals. The top two teams from the Final 6 advanced to the 2026 Basketball Champions League Asia. Two teams from same country could not qualify to BCL Asia. The final 6 was held at the Arena Larkin Indoor Stadium in Johor, Malaysia.

=== Group C ===
Note: All times are Time in Malaysia (UTC+8)

Pos	Team	Pld	W	L	PF	PA	PD	Pts	Qualification
1	(Indonesia) Dewa United Banten	2	2	0	189	140	+49	4	Advance to Semifinals
2	(Mongolia) Chinggis Broncos	2	1	1	150	188	−38	3	Advance to Semifinals
3	(Malaysia) Johor Southern Tigers	2	0	2	180	191	−11	2	

Source: FIBA

19 May
20:00

Boxscore

Johor Southern Tigers (Malaysia)	93–97	(Mongolia) Chinggis Broncos
Scoring by quarter: 18–28, 23–20, 21–18, 31–31
Pts: Lewis 36; Rebs: M. Lee 20; Asts: M. Lee 5		Pts: Miller 32; Rebs: Tshimanga 16; Asts: Lemon, Tshimanga 3

Arena Larkin Indoor Stadium, Johor
Attendance: 1,578
Referees: Zhang Xiao (CHN), Rakesh Ramalingaiah (IND), Yuen Chun Yip (HKG)

20 May
20:00

Boxscore

Chinggis Broncos (Mongolia)	53–95	(Indonesia) Dewa United Banten
Scoring by quarter: 19–31, 9–29, 11–22, 14–13
Pts: Temuulen 9 Rebs: Tshimanga 8 Asts: Azbayar 2		Pts: Gillenwater 23; Rebs: Ibarra 13; Asts: Cooper 14

Arena Larkin Indoor Stadium, Johor
Attendance: 423
Referees: Yuen Chun Yip (HKG), Zhang Xiao (CHN), Preeda Muongmee (THA)

21 May
20:00

Boxscore

Dewa United Banten (Indonesia)	94–87	(Malaysia) Johor Southern Tigers
Scoring by quarter: 20–29, 29–27, 18–15, 27–16
Pts: Gillenwater, Ibarra 25; Rebs: Ibarra 16; Asts: Cooper 12		Pts: Ting 26; Rebs: M. Lee 16; Asts: M. Lee 8

Arena Larkin Indoor Stadium, Johor
Attendance: 2,238
Referees: Zhang Xiao (CHN), Lee Kyoung-Hwan (KOR), Yuen Chun Yip (HKG)

=== Group D ===
Pos	Team	Pld	W	L	PF	PA	PD	Pts	Qualification
1	(Hong Kong) South China	2	2	0	202	193	+9	4	Advance to Semifinals
2	(Chinese Taipei) Taoyuan Pauian Pilots	2	1	1	207	185	+22	3	Advance to Semifinals
3	(Thailand) Hi-Tech	2	0	2	165	196	−31	2	

Source: FIBA

19 May
17:00

Boxscore

South China (Hong Kong)	92–90	(Thailand) Hi-Tech
Scoring by quarter: 30–19, 24–32, 18–26, 20–13
Pts: Davenport 25; Rebs: Davenport 9 Asts: Briscoe 7		Pts: Freeman 25; Rebs: Freeman 18; Asts: Fields 5

Arena Larkin Indoor Stadium, Johor
Attendance: 653
Referees: Lee Kyoung-Hwan (KOR), Budi Marfan (INA), Chan Owe Shiong (MAS)

20 May
17:00

Boxscore

Hi-Tech (Thailand)	75–104	(Chinese Taipei) Taoyuan Pauian Pilots
Scoring by quarter: 19–25, 16–22, 14–33, 26–24
Pts: Freeman 16; Rebs: Jakrawan 7 Asts: Fields 4		Pts: Millner 20; Rebs: Artino 14; Asts: Lu 6

Arena Larkin Indoor Stadium, Johor
Attendance: 196
Referees: Lee Kyoung-Hwan (KOR), Chan Owe Shiong (MAS), Rakesh Ramalingaiah (IND)

21 May
17:00

Boxscore

Taoyuan Pauian Pilots (Chinese Taipei)	103–110	(Hong Kong) South China
Scoring by quarter: 31–25, 28–26, 24–23, 20–36
Pts: Artino 26; Rebs: Brown 12; Asts: Chen C., Graham 6		Pts: Briscoe 45; Rebs: Davenport, Andela 7 Asts: Tsang 4

Arena Larkin Indoor Stadium, Johor
Attendance: 835
Referees: Budi Marfan (INA), Preeda Muongmee (THA), Rakesh Ramalingaiah (IND)

=== Bracket ===
Semifinals
(Hong Kong) South China	90
(Mongolia) Chinggis Broncos	75
(Indonesia) Dewa United Banten	86
(Chinese Taipei) Taoyuan Pauian Pilots	100

Finals
(Hong Kong) South China	113
(Chinese Taipei) Taoyuan Pauian Pilots	103
Third place
(Mongolia) Chinggis Broncos	84
(Indonesia) Dewa United Banten	66

=== Semifinals ===
23 May
17:00

Boxscore

South China (Hong Kong)	90–75	(Mongolia) Chinggis Broncos
Scoring by quarter: 30–22, 21–13, 20–26, 19–14
Pts: Andela 24; Rebs: Andela 16; Asts: Briscoe 9		Pts: Lemon 22; Rebs: Tshimanga 24; Asts: Barsbold 6

Arena Larkin Indoor Stadium, Johor
Attendance: 583
Referees: Lee Kyoung-Hwan (KOR), Rakesh Ramalingaiah (IND), Budi Marfan (INA)

23 May
20:00

Boxscore

Dewa United Banten (Indonesia)	86–100	(Chinese Taipei) Taoyuan Pauian Pilots
Scoring by quarter: 32–35, 31–23, 12–23, 11–19
Pts: Gillenwater 33; Rebs: Ibarra 15; Asts: Cooper 9		Pts: Millner 23; Rebs: Millner, Artino 10; Asts: Lu 5

Arena Larkin Indoor Stadium, Johor
Attendance: 1,292
Referees: Preeda Muongmee (THA), Yuen Chun Yip (HKG), Chan Owe Shiong (MAS)

=== Third place game ===
24 May
17:00

Boxscore

Dewa United Banten (Indonesia)	66–84	(Mongolia) Chinggis Broncos
Scoring by quarter: 15–20, 31–27, 11–18, 9–19
Pts: Nikolas 14; Rebs: Ibarra 9 Asts: Disi 8		Pts: Azbayar 15; Rebs: Tshimanga 14; Asts: Bilguun 8

Arena Larkin Indoor Stadium, Johor
Attendance: 1,292
Referees: Yuen Chun Yip (HKG), Zhang Xiao (CHN), Chan Owe Shiong (MAS)

=== Finals ===
24 May
20:00

Boxscore

Taoyuan Pauian Pilots (Chinese Taipei)	103–113	(Hong Kong) South China
Scoring by quarter: 27–32, 26–29, 25–33, 25–19
Pts: Artino 35; Rebs: Artino 13; Asts: Pai 7		Pts: Davenport 30; Rebs: Andela 15; Asts: Yang 6

Arena Larkin Indoor Stadium, Johor
Attendance: 1,570
Referees: Lee Kyoung-Hwan (KOR), Budi Marfan (INA), Preeda Muongmee (THA)

== Qualified teams ==
The following two teams qualified for the 2026 Basketball Champions League Asia. On September 3, the FIBA announced that 2026 Basketball Champions League Asia was cancelled.

Team	Qualified on	Qualified as
(Hong Kong) South China	23 May 2026	2026 BCL Asia – East champion
(Chinese Taipei) Taoyuan Pauian Pilots	23 May 2026	2026 BCL Asia – East runner-up
