= Nam Ching Basketball =

Nam Ching
- Leagues: Hong Kong A1 Division Championship
- Location: Hong Kong
- Ownership: South China Athletic Association

Nam Ching
- Chinese: 南青
- Jyutping: naam4 cing1
- Cantonese Yale: nàahm chīng
- Hanyu Pinyin: Nán qīng
- Literal meaning: South Youth
Transcriptions
Standard Mandarin
- Hanyu Pinyin: Nán qīng
Yue: Cantonese
- Yale Romanization: nàahm chīng
- Jyutping: naam4 cing1

Nam Ching Basketball is a Hong Kong men's basketball team of the South China Athletic Association (SCAA). The basketball section of the club had their first team known as just South China, while the second team Nam Ching (Chinese: 南青), was the transliteration of South [China] Youth. Nam Ching competes in Hong Kong A1 Division Championship.

== History ==
Nam Ching Basketball is a team of South China Athletic Association. Nam Ching Basketball and their sister team South China AA Basketball Team, were the senior full members (out of a total of 16 senior full members) of the Hong Kong Basketball Association.

Nam Ching participated in 1977 Hong Kong A1 Division Championship as the winner of Hong Kong A2 Division Championship. The team avoided relegation in December 1977, by winning Citizen.

In 2014 the team promoted again from 2014 Hong Kong A2 Division to 2015 Hong Kong A1 Division. The team avoided relegation in 2015 season.

The team were struggled to win in 2017 season. The team made their first win on 20 June 2017.

== Honours ==
- Hong Kong A2 Division Championship
  - c.1976, 1980, 1986, 2014
