= Marcus Lee =

American basketball player (born 1994)

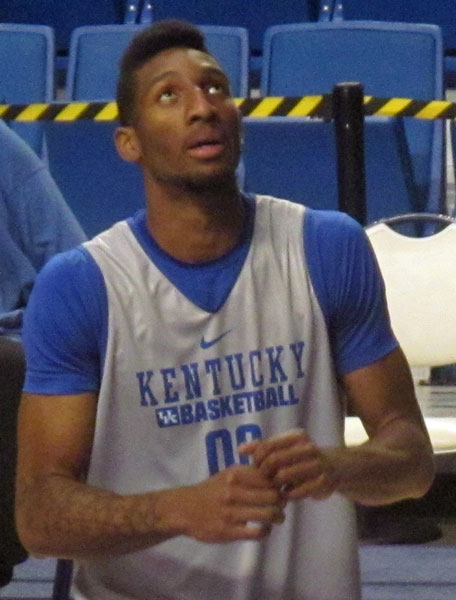
- Lee in 2015

No. 13 – Shinshu Brave Warriors
- Position: Power forward / center
- League: B.League

Personal information
- Born: September 14, 1994 (age 32) San Francisco, California, U.S.
- Listed height: 6 ft 11 in (2.11 m)
- Listed weight: 218 lb (99 kg)

Career information
- High school: Deer Valley (Antioch, California)
- College: Kentucky (2013–2016); California (2017–2018)
- NBA draft: 2018: undrafted
- Playing career: 2018–present

Career history
- 2018–2020: Sioux Falls Skyforce
- 2020–2021: Vanoli Cremona
- 2021–2022: Semt77 Yalovaspor
- 2022: Leones de Ponce
- 2022: Manresa
- 2022–2023: Melbourne United
- 2023: Pallacanestro Reggiana
- 2023–2024: Tasmania JackJumpers
- 2024–2025: Melbourne United
- 2025: Wilki Morskie Szczecin
- 2025–2026: Cairns Taipans
- 2026: San Miguel Beermen
- 2026: Johor Southern Tigers
- 2026–present: Shinshu Brave Warriors

Career highlights
- NBL champion (2024); McDonald's All-American (2013); First-team Parade All-American (2013)
- Stats at Basketball Reference

Marcus Andrew Lee (born September 14, 1994) is an American professional basketball player for the Shinshu Brave Warriors of the Japanese B.League. He played college basketball for the Kentucky Wildcats and University of California Golden Bears.

== Early life ==
Lee was born in San Francisco, California, and raised in the Bay Area with three older brothers.

== High school career ==
Lee attended Deer Valley High School in Antioch, California, where he was a starter on the varsity basketball team. As a junior, he averaged 13.9 points, 13.1 rebounds, 9.1 blocks, and 1.3 steals per game. During his senior year he averaged 17.7 points, 19.5 rebounds, and 6.7 blocks per game.

He led Deer Valley to the 2013 CIF North Coast Sectionals to defeat De La Salle High School from Concord, California.

Lee was a consensus top 20 player in the high school class of 2013 according to various recruiting services. He played in the 2013 McDonald's All American and Jordan Brand Classic games and was named 3rd team USA Today and first-team Parade All-American.

== College career ==
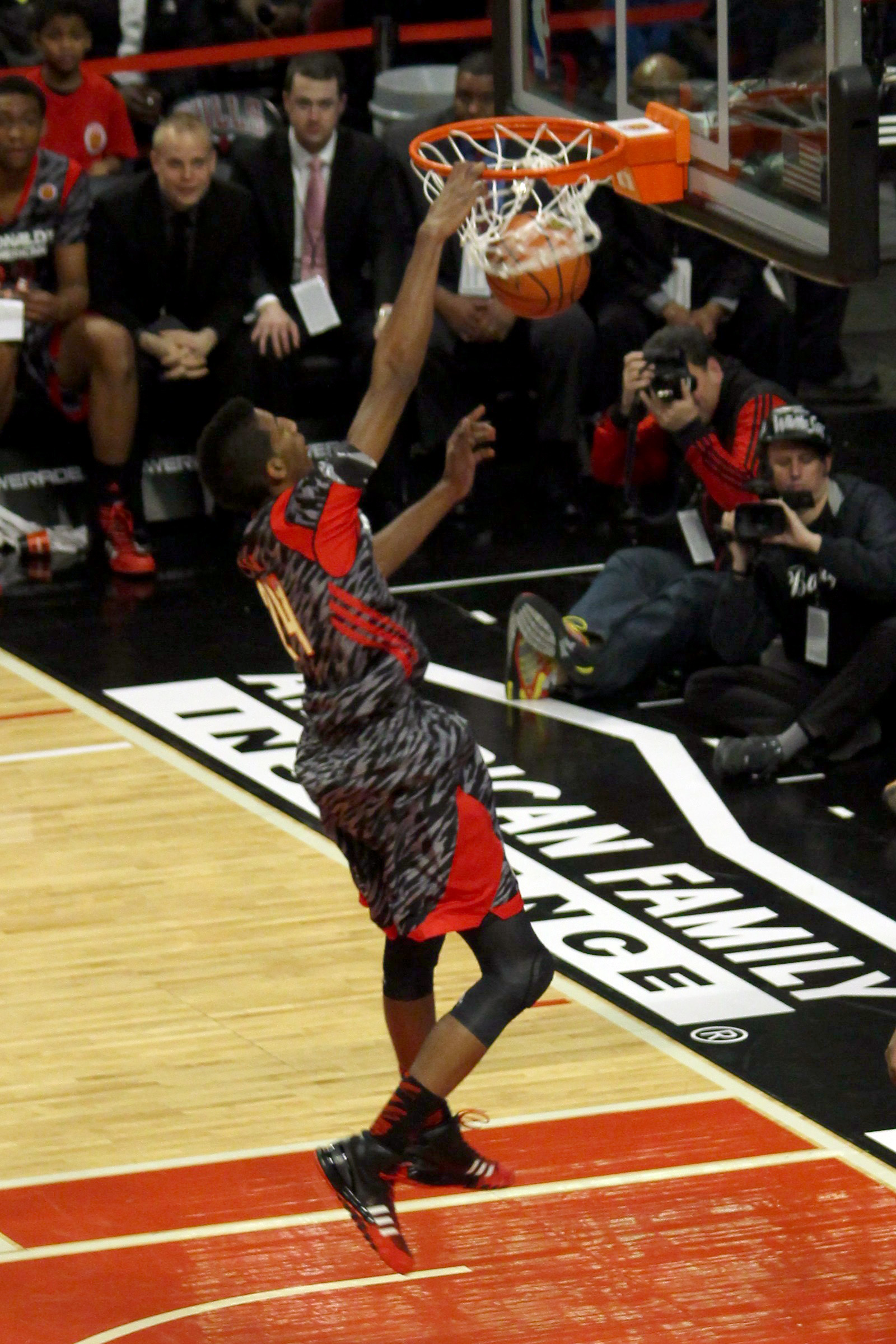
Lee dunking in the 2013 McDonald's All-American Boys Game

On October 18, 2012, Lee committed to play at the University of Kentucky. He joined Julius Randle, twins Andrew Harrison and Aaron Harrison, James Young, and Dakari Johnson as one of six Kentucky signees to be selected in the 2013 McDonald's All-American Boys Game as well as the 2013 Jordan Brand Classic.

Although Lee was behind 7-footers Willie Cauley-Stein and Dakari Johnson in the rotation for much of the 2013 season, Lee found his way in the starting lineup over Cauley-Stein for four games in the beginning of the year. Lee scored 17 points shooting 7 for 8 in the regular-season opener vs. UNC Ashville on November 8, 2013, and 10 points shooting 4 for 5 against Texas-Arlington on November 19. However, he was not used very often throughout the season, appearing in only 25 of 40 games and averaging just 2.4 PPG in 6.3 minutes per game. When Cauley-Stein suffered an injury against arch-rival Louisville in the Sweet 16 of the 2014 NCAA Tournament, Marcus Lee stepped up in the following game vs. the Michigan Wolverines in the Elite 8 and scored 10 points, grabbed 8 rebounds (7 offensive), and had two blocked shots, all while committing zero fouls or turnovers. Because of his performance in the Elite 8, Lee was named to the Midwest Regional All-Tournament team, along with teammates Aaron Harrison and Midwest Regional Most Outstanding Player Julius Randle. That year Wildcats made it to the finals but lost to Connecticut. During the 2013–14 season Lee played 25 games, averaging 2.4 points and 1.4 rebounds per game.

On April 18, 2014, Lee announced he would return to the University of Kentucky for his sophomore year to join a front court including Cauley-Stein, Johnson, Alex Poythress, Karl-Anthony Towns, Trey Lyles, and Derek Willis. During the 2014–15 season Lee played 39 games, averaging 2.6 points and 2.7 rebounds per game. During 2015–16, he played in 36 games, starting 20 of them. He had the highest number of rebounds in his team in 12 games. He finished the season with 6.4 points and 6.0 rebounds per game.

During the month of April, Lee was announced as one out of 162 underclassmen to enter his name for the 2016 NBA draft. Furthermore, Lee was one of 63 participants for the 2016 NBA Draft Combine as one of only two or three alternates being a part of the event. However, he would withdraw his name from the draft on the May 25 deadline, announcing he would also transfer out of Kentucky. While playing at Kentucky, Lee became known for regularly participating in charitable activities, head coach John Calipari noted that “Marcus is one of the most conscientious and considerate people I’ve ever been around.”

In June 2016, Lee joined the University of California Golden Bears. In his redshirt senior season at California, Lee started all 32 games and averaged 11.4 points, 7.2 rebounds, 1.6 blocks, and 1.3 assists per game. He had the eight-highest single-season blocks in school history with 52.

== Professional career ==
After going undrafted in the 2018 NBA draft, Lee played for the Cleveland Cavaliers in the NBA Summer League and spent preseason with the Miami Heat. He subsequently joined the Sioux Falls Skyforce of the NBA G League for the 2018–19 season. In 19 games, he averaged 8.3 points and 6.4 rebounds per game, while shooting 73.3 percent from the field.

After short preseason stints with Aris Thessaloniki in Greece and Bnei Herzliya in Israel, Lee re-joined the Skyforce for the 2019–20 season. He averaged 10.9 points, 7.5 rebounds, 1.5 assists, 1.6 blocks per game in 2019–20.

On August 9, 2020, Lee signed with Vanoli Cremona of the Italian Lega Basket Serie A (LBA) for the 2020–21 season.

On July 2, 2021, Lee signed with Semt77 Yalovaspor of the Turkish Basketball Super League. Following the 2021–22 season, he joined Leones de Ponce in Puerto Rico for the 2022 BSN season.

On July 30, 2022, Lee signed with Baxi Manresa of the Liga ACB. In November 2022, he left Manresa and signed with Melbourne United in Australia for the rest of the 2022–23 NBL season. On February 8, 2023, he signed with Pallacanestro Reggiana of the Lega Basket Serie A.

On June 22, 2023, Lee signed with the Tasmania JackJumpers for the 2023–24 NBL season. During the NBL post-season, he suffered a shoulder injury during the seeding qualifier, was suspended for game two of the semi-finals series, and later during the grand final series suffered a season-ending knee injury.

On August 9, 2024, Lee signed with Melbourne United for the 2024–25 NBL season, returning to the team for a second stint.

In March 2025, Lee joined Wilki Morskie Szczecin of the Polish Basketball League (PLK).

On August 13, 2025, Lee signed with the Cairns Taipans for the 2025–26 NBL season, joining his third NBL club.

On February 23, 2026, it was announced that the San Miguel Beermen of the Philippine Basketball Association (PBA) would hire Lee as its import for the 2026 PBA Commissioner's Cup. On March 27, 2026, he was replaced by Justin Patton. In April 2026, Lee signed with the Johor Southern Tigers of the Major Basketball League Malaysia for the BCL Asia – East.
