= Jabari Bird =

American basketball player (born 1994)

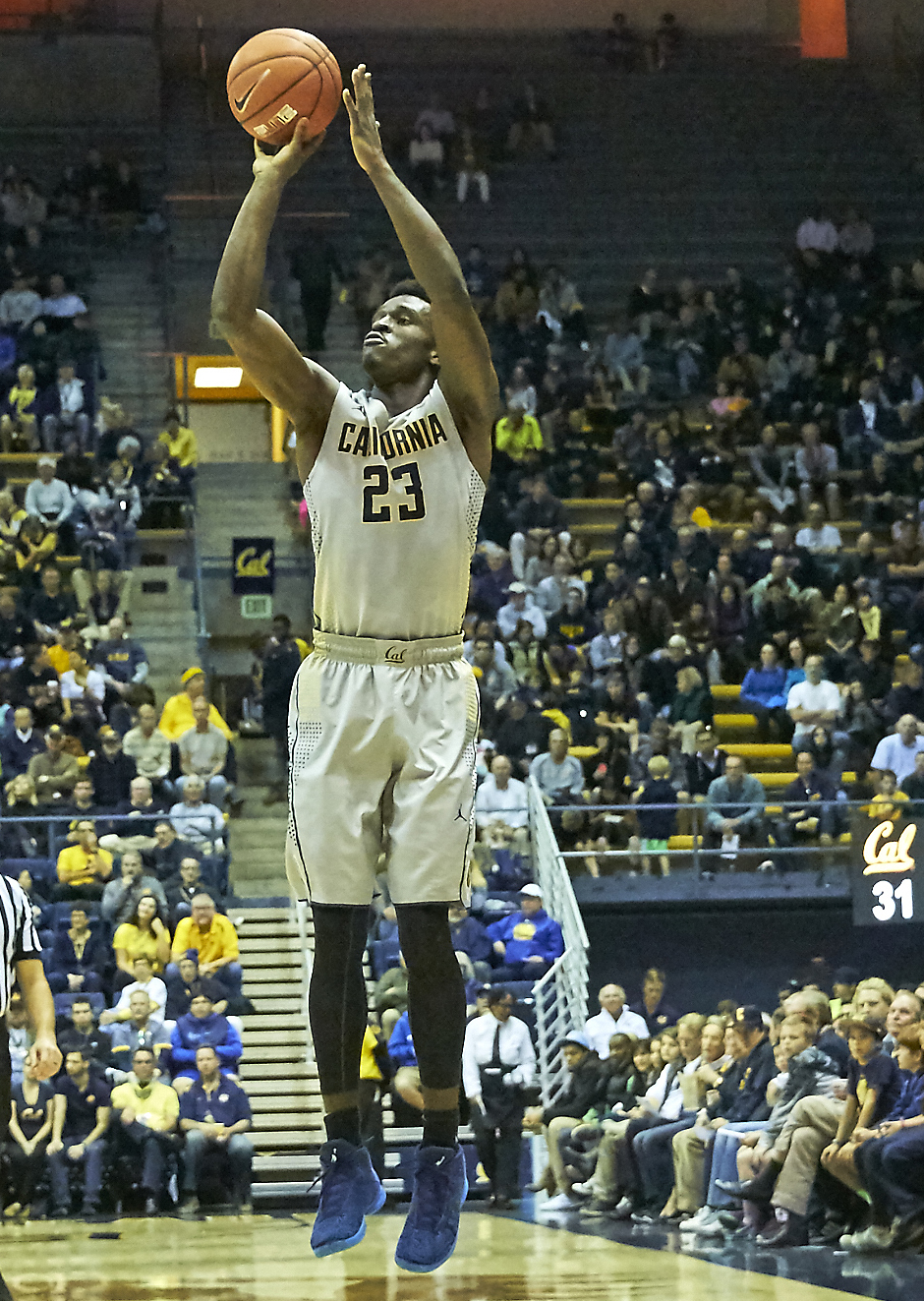
- Bird with the California Golden Bears in 2015

No. 92 – Johor Southern Tigers
- Position: Shooting guard
- League: MBL

Personal information
- Born: July 3, 1994 (age 32) Walnut Creek, California, U.S.
- Listed height: 6 ft 6 in (1.98 m)
- Listed weight: 198 lb (90 kg)

Career information
- High school: Salesian (Richmond, California)
- College: California (2013–2017)
- NBA draft: 2017: 2nd round, 56th overall pick
- Drafted by: Boston Celtics
- Playing career: 2017–2019; 2023–present

Career history
- 2017–2019: Boston Celtics
- 2017–2018: →Maine Red Claws
- 2023: Rayos de Hermosillo
- 2023–2024: Rajawali Medan
- 2024: Magnolia Chicken Timplados Hotshots
- 2024–2025: Johor Southern Tigers
- 2025: Taipei Fubon Braves
- 2026: Oberá Tenis Club
- 2026–present: Johor Southern Tigers

Career highlights
- MBL champion (2025); MBL Finals MVP (2025); All-IBL Second Team (2024); McDonald's All-American (2013)
- Stats at NBA.com
- Stats at Basketball Reference

Jabari Carl Bird (born July 3, 1994) is an American professional basketball player for Johor Southern Tigers of the Major Basketball League Malaysia (MBL). He played college basketball for the California Golden Bears. He was selected in the second round of the 2017 NBA draft by the Boston Celtics.

== High school career ==
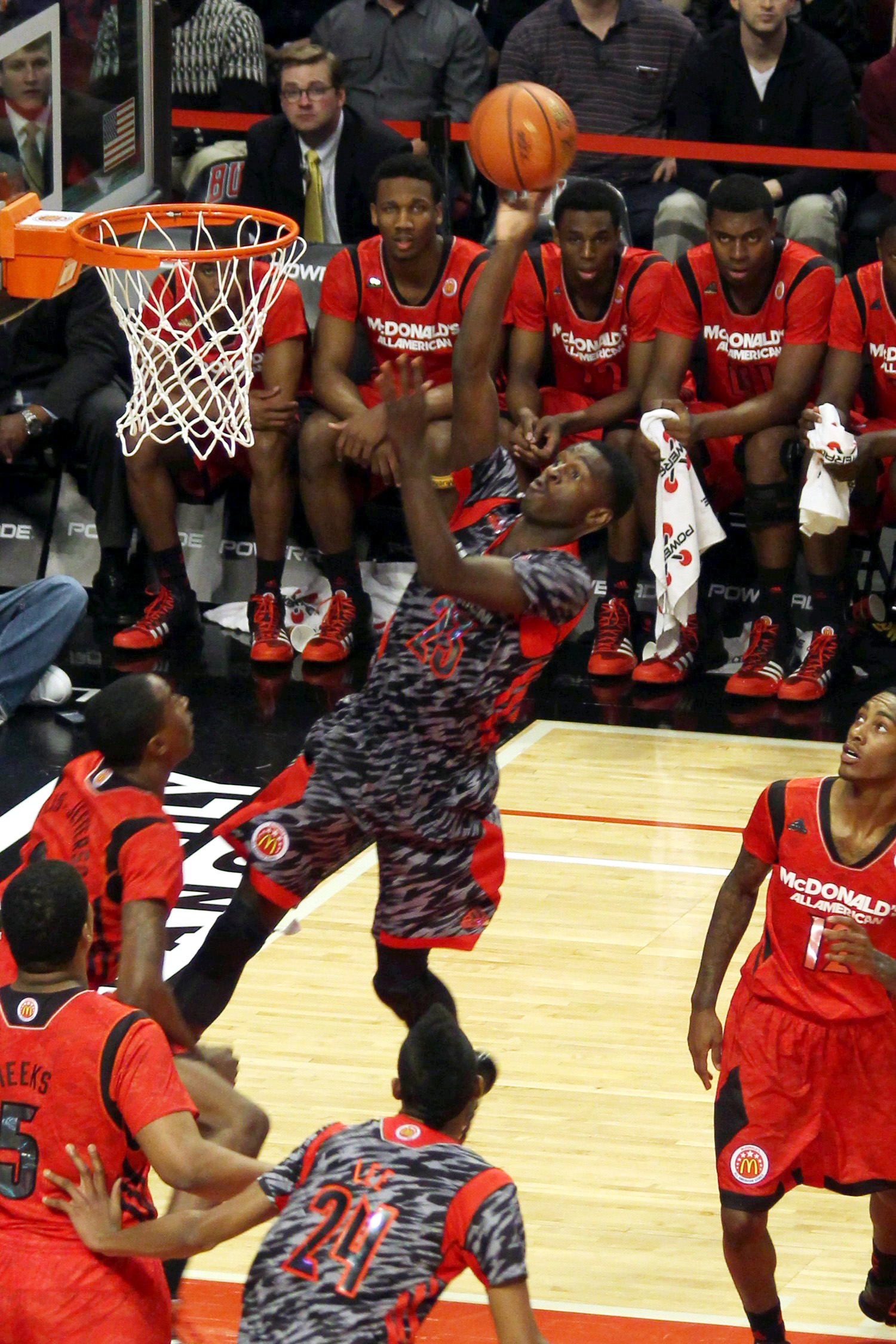
Bird in the 2013 McDonald's All-American Game

Bird played his high school basketball at Salesian High School where he led the Pride to an overall 100–8 record in his three years on the team. Bird was a McDonald's All-American in high school and was the No. 20 overall recruit in the 2013 class.

College recruiting
Name	Hometown	School	Height	Weight	Commit date
Jabari Bird; SG	Vallejo, California	Salesian HS	6 ft 6 in (1.98 m)	190 lb (86 kg)	Sep 5, 2012
Jabari Bird; SG	Recruit ratings: Scout: Rivals: 247Sports: ESPN:				
Overall recruit ranking: Scout: 13 Rivals: 32 247Sports: 21 ESPN: 23
Note: In many cases, Scout, Rivals, 247Sports, On3, and ESPN may conflict in their listings of height and weight.; In these cases, the average was taken. ESPN grades are on a 100-point scale.; Sources:

== College career ==
As a senior at the University of California, Berkeley, Bird averaged 14.3 points and 4.7 rebounds per game. He suffered a concussion in a loss to Oregon on March 11, 2017.

== Professional career ==
=== Boston Celtics (2017–2019) ===
After finishing his senior year at California, Bird was selected with the 56th pick of the 2017 NBA draft by the Boston Celtics. On September 5, 2017, Bird was signed to a two-way contract by the Celtics. Under the terms of the deal, he split time between the Celtics and their G League affiliate, the Maine Red Claws. Bird made his professional debut on October 20, 2017, against the Philadelphia 76ers. He played 13 minutes and scored 3 points in a 108–98 win over the 76ers.

On February 2, 2018, Bird and teammate Kadeem Allen were named to the Midseason All-NBA G League East Team after averaging 19.3 points, 5.7 rebounds and 2.7 assists per game.

On April 6, 2018, Bird scored 15 points in 24 minutes in a Celtics game against the Chicago Bulls.

On July 26, 2018, the Celtics re-signed Bird. However, due to ongoing legal issues, he did not play for the Celtics during the 2018–19 season.

On February 7, 2019, Bird was traded to the Atlanta Hawks along with cash considerations in exchange for a conditional 2020 second-round pick. He was waived the following day.

=== International stints (2023–present) ===
Bird joined Rayos de Hermosillo of the Circuito de Baloncesto de la Costa del Pacífico (CIBACOPA) for the 2023 season.

On November 30, 2023, Bird joined the then-newly formed team Rajawali Medan, a competing group in the Indonesian Basketball League.

On September 26, 2024, Bird signed with the Magnolia Chicken Timplados Hotshots of the Philippine Basketball Association (PBA) to replace Rayvonte Rice as the team's import for the 2024 PBA Governors' Cup.

In December 2024, Bird joined the Johor Southern Tigers of the Major Basketball League Malaysia (MBL).

On February 1, 2025, Bird signed with the Taipei Fubon Braves of the P. League+ in Taiwan.

On January 5, 2026, Bird signed with Oberá Tenis Club of the La Liga Argentina de Básquet.

== Career statistics ==
Legend
GP	Games played	GS	Games started	MPG	Minutes per game
FG%	Field goal percentage	3P%	3-point field goal percentage	FT%	Free throw percentage
RPG	Rebounds per game	APG	Assists per game	SPG	Steals per game
BPG	Blocks per game	PPG	Points per game	**Bold**	Career high

=== NBA ===
Year	Team	GP	GS	MPG	FG%	3P%	FT%	RPG	APG	SPG	BPG	PPG
2017–18	Boston	13	1	8.8	.577	.429	.462	1.5	.6	.2	.1	3.0
Career		13	1	8.8	.577	.429	.462	1.5	.6	.2	.1	3.0

=== College ===
Year	Team	GP	GS	MPG	FG%	3P%	FT%	RPG	APG	SPG	BPG	PPG
2013–14	California	31	12	20.0	.425	.323	**.804**	2.0	1.1	.4	.3	8.3
2014–15	California	23	21	28.2	.438	.369	.765	3.3	**1.7**	.5	**.4**	10.5
2015–16	California	**33**	22	26.8	**.461**	**.409**	.674	3.3	.9	.5	.3	10.4
2016–17	California	27	**25**	**32.0**	.440	.365	.764	**4.7**	1.0	**.7**	.2	**14.3**
Career		114	80	26.4	.442	.371	.753	3.3	1.2	.5	.3	10.8

== Personal life ==
Bird's father, Carl, played college basketball for the California Golden Bears from 1974 to 1976 and was selected in the 1976 NBA draft. He played professionally in the Philippines where he was the first player in the Philippine Basketball Association to score more than 70 points in a game.

=== Domestic abuse charges ===
On September 8, 2018, Bird was arrested and faced domestic abuse and kidnapping charges. He was placed under police guard at a hospital, as was his alleged victim. Before the incident occurred, it was revealed that Bird was previously dealing with emotional issues, including panic attacks. On March 11, 2019, he was released from prison on bail after admitting to sufficient facts regarding the incident.

On October 26, 2021, Bird pled guilty and was sentenced to two years probation.
