= Kyvon Davenport =

American basketball player (born 1996)

No. 10 – South China
- Position: Power forward
- League: Hong Kong A1 Division Championship; Basketball Champions League Asia

Personal information
- Born: August 28, 1996 (age 29) Gainesville, Georgia, U.S.
- Listed height: 6 ft 8 in (2.03 m)
- Listed weight: 215 lb (98 kg)

Career information
- High school: East Hall (Hall County, Georgia)
- College: Georgia Highlands (2015–2017); Memphis (2017–2019)
- NBA draft: 2019: undrafted
- Playing career: 2019–present

Career history
- 2019–2020: Hapoel Eilat
- 2020: Cholet Basket
- 2021: BC Budivelnyk
- 2021–2022: Orléans Loiret Basket
- 2023: Héroes de Falcón
- 2023–2024: Sabah
- 2024: Al Bataeh Club
- 2026–present: South China

Kyvon Davenport (born August 28, 1996) is an American professional basketball player for South China of the Hong Kong A1 Division Championship and Basketball Champions League Asia . He played college basketball for Georgia Highlands College and the University of Memphis before playing professionally in Israel. Standing at 6 ft 8 in (2.03 m), he primarily plays at the power forward position.

== High school career ==
Davenport grew up in Gainesville, Georgia. He attended East Hall High School in Hall County, Georgia, where he averaged 22 points, 12 rebounds and three blocked shots per game as a senior. Davenport led his team to the Class AAA state quarterfinals, while earning the AAA All-State First Team honors in 2014–15.

== College career ==
Davenport started his college basketball career at Georgia Highlands College, where he was named a First Team Junior College All-American by the National Association of Basketball Coaches. Davenport averaged 16.5 points and 10.5 rebounds per game, while leading his team to a 32–2 overall record. On April 9, 2017, Davenport committed to the University of Memphis after receiving offers from ETSU, Ole Miss, Murray State and UTE.

Davenport played his final two years of college at Memphis under head coaches Tubby Smith and Penny Hardaway respectively. On December 15, 2018, Davenport recorded a college career-high 31 points, shooting 12-of-17 from the field, along with 11 rebounds in a 92–102 loss to Tennessee. Davenport led the Tigers in rebounding (6.9) and averaged 13.1 points per game in his senior year.

== Professional career ==
On August 15, 2019, Davenport started his professional career with Hapoel Eilat of the Israeli Premier League, signing a one-year deal. On October 14, 2019, Davenport recorded 21 points in his second game with Eilat, he shot 6-of-11 from the field, along with eight rebounds and two blocks in an 86–102 loss to Maccabi Tel Aviv. He averaged 13.3 points and 6.8 rebounds per game. On June 25, 2020, Davenport signed with Cholet Basket of the LNB Pro A. He averaged 9.9 points and 4.1 rebounds per game in seven games. On January 11, 2021, Davenport signed with BC Budivelnyk of the Ukrainian league. He averaged 13.8 points, 3.3 rebounds, 1.2 assists and 1.0 steal per game. On September 23, 2021, Davenport signed with Orléans Loiret Basket of the LNB Pro A.

He played for the Héroes de Falcón in Venuezela during the summer of 2023. For the 2023–24 season, Davenport joined Sabah BC of the Azerbaijan Basketball League.
