= 2024 PBA Governors' Cup =

First conference of the 2024–25 PBA season

- Duration: August 18 – November 8, 2024
- TV partner(s): Local: RPTV; PBA Rush (HD); International: Pilipinas Live; Online: Pilipinas Live

Finals
- Champions: TNT Tropang Giga
- Runners-up: Barangay Ginebra San Miguel

Awards
- Best Player: June Mar Fajardo (San Miguel Beermen)
- Best Import: Rondae Hollis-Jefferson (TNT Tropang Giga)
- Finals MVP: Jayson Castro (TNT Tropang Giga)

PBA Governors' Cup chronology
- < 2023 2026 >

PBA conference chronology
- < 2024 Philippine 2024–25 Commissioner's >

The 2024 PBA Governors' Cup, also known as the 2024 Honda PBA Governors' Cup for sponsorship reasons, was the first conference of the 2024–25 PBA season of the Philippine Basketball Association (PBA). The 22nd edition of the Governors' Cup started on August 18 and ended on November 8, 2024. The tournament allowed teams to hire foreign players or imports with a height limit of 6 feet 6 inches (1.98 m).

== Format ==
The following format was observed for the duration of the conference:

- The teams were divided into 2 groups, based on the previous season's conference finish on a weighted average, with 40% for the Commissioner's Cup, and 60% for the Philippine Cup. This was identically distributed to the reverse drafting order.
  - Group A:
    1. Meralco Bolts (2nd)
    2. Magnolia Chicken Timplados Hotshots (4th)
    3. TNT Tropang Giga (6th)
    4. NorthPort Batang Pier (8th)
    5. Terrafirma Dyip (10th)
    6. Converge FiberXers (12th)
  - Group B:
    1. San Miguel Beermen (1st)
    2. Barangay Ginebra San Miguel (3rd)
    3. Rain or Shine Elasto Painters (5th)
    4. NLEX Road Warriors (7th)
    5. Phoenix Fuel Masters (9th)
    6. Blackwater Bossing (11th)
- Teams in a group will play each other twice; 10 games per team; Teams are then seeded by basis on win–loss records by basis of groups. Ties are broken among point differentials of the tied teams.
- The top four teams per group will qualify to the crossover best-of-five quarterfinals.
  - QF1: Group A #1 vs. Group B #4
  - QF2: Group A #2 vs. Group B #3
  - QF3: Group A #3 vs. Group B #2
  - QF4: Group A #4 vs. Group B #1
- The two winners in each group will play in the best-of-seven semifinals.
  - SF1: QF1 vs. QF4
  - SF2: QF2 vs. QF3
- The two remaining teams that came out on top in their respective group will play in the best-of-seven championship series.

The structure of the playoff bracket, with both group winners potentially meeting in the semifinals (instead of the finals), was said to have been overlooked by the league, as per Rain or Shine coach Yeng Guiao.

== Elimination round ==
=== Group A ===
==== Team standings ====
Pos	Team	W	L	PCT	GB	Qualification
1	TNT Tropang Giga	8	2	.800	—	Quarterfinals
2	Meralco Bolts	7	3	.700	1	Quarterfinals
3	Converge FiberXers	6	4	.600	2	Quarterfinals
4	Magnolia Chicken Timplados Hotshots	5	5	.500	3	Quarterfinals
5	NorthPort Batang Pier	3	7	.300	5	
6	Terrafirma Dyip	1	9	.100	7	

Source: PBA.ph
Rules for classification: 1) winning percentage; 2) if two teams are tied, head-to-head record, if three or more teams are tied, head-to-head goal average (quotient); 3) overall quotient; 4) coin toss

==== Results ====
Team	Game									
Team	1	2	3	4	5	6	7	8	9	10
Converge (CON)	TER; 127–95	MAG; 93–105	TNT; 96–95	NP; 109–135	MER; 88–116	TNT; 91–98	NP; 107–99	TER; 100–99	MER; 105–97	MAG; 89–82
Magnolia (MAG)	MER; 94–99	CON; 105–93	TNT; 82–88	TER; 124–103	NP; 105–94	MER; 74–82	TER; 99–98	TNT; 82–84	NP; 110–94	CON; 82–89
Meralco (MER)	MAG; 99–94	TNT; 73–93	TER; 107–91	NP; 109–99	CON; 116–88	MAG; 82–74	TNT; 99–108	NP; 114–104	CON; 97–105	TER; 124–82
NorthPort (NP)	TNT; 95–101	TER; 112–93	CON; 135–109	MER; 99–109	MAG; 94–105	TER; 133–107	CON; 99–107	MER; 104–114	MAG; 94–110	TNT; 79–99
Terrafirma (TER)	CON; 95–127	NP; 93–112	MER; 91–107	MAG; 103–124	TNT; 89–107	NP; 107–133	MAG; 98–99	CON; 99–100	TNT; 84–72	MER; 82–124
TNT	NP; 101–95	MER; 93–73	CON; 95–96	MAG; 88–82	TER; 107–89	CON; 98–91	MER; 108–99	MAG; 84–82	TER; 72–84	NP; 99–79

Source: PBA.ph
Legend: Blue = win; Red = loss

=== Group B ===
==== Team standings ====
Pos	Team	W	L	PCT	GB	Qualification
1	Rain or Shine Elasto Painters	7	3	.700	—	Quarterfinals
2	San Miguel Beermen	6	4	.600 (Note: Head-to-head record: San Miguel 1–1 Barangay Ginebra (San Miguel 1.23, Barangay Ginebra 0.82))	1	Quarterfinals
3	Barangay Ginebra San Miguel	6	4	.600	1	Quarterfinals
4	NLEX Road Warriors	5	5	.500 (Note: Head-to-head record: NLEX 1–1 Blackwater (NLEX 1.03, Blackwater 0.97))	2	Quarterfinals
5	Blackwater Bossing	5	5	.500	2	
6	Phoenix Fuel Masters	1	9	.100	6	

Source: PBA.ph
Rules for classification: 1) winning percentage; 2) if two teams are tied, head-to-head record, if three or more teams are tied, head-to-head goal average (quotient); 3) overall quotient; 4) coin toss

==== Results ====
Team	Game									
Team	1	2	3	4	5	6	7	8	9	10
Barangay Ginebra (BGSM)	ROS; 64–73	SMB; 108–102	BWB; 88–95	NLEX; 119–91	PHX; 110–101	BWB; 112–98	ROS; 124–102	SMB; 82–131	PHX; 112–96	NLEX; 99–103*
Blackwater (BWB)	ROS; 97–110	NLEX; 87–104	SMB; 108–128	BGSM; 95–88	PHX; 123–111	NLEX; 110–99	BGSM; 98–112	PHX; 114–119	SMB; 111–94	ROS; 139–118
NLEX	BWB; 104–87	PHX; 100–95	ROS; 105–124	SMB; 112–108*	BGSM; 91–119	BWB; 99–110	SMB; 114–119	ROS; 114–123*	PHX; 104–79	BGSM; 103–99*
Phoenix (PHX)	SMB; 107–111	NLEX; 95–100	ROS; 99–116	BWB; 111–123	BGSM; 101–110	ROS; 107–122	SMB; 127–139	BWB; 119–114	BGSM; 96–112	NLEX; 79–104
Rain or Shine (ROS)	BWB; 110–97	BGSM; 73–64	NLEX; 124–105	PHX; 116–99	SMB; 112–113	PHX; 122–107	BGSM; 102–124	NLEX; 123–114*	SMB; 122–112	BWB; 118–139
San Miguel (SMB)	PHX; 111–107	BWB; 128–108	BGSM; 102–108	NLEX; 108–112*	ROS; 113–112	NLEX; 119–114	PHX; 139–127	BGSM; 131–82	ROS; 112–122	BWB; 94–111

Source: PBA.ph
Legend: Blue = win; Red = loss; Matches with lighter background shading were decided after overtime. (*) Number of asterisks denotes number of overtime periods

== Bracket ==
Quarterfinals (Best-of-5)
A1	TNT	3
B4	NLEX	1
B1	Rain or Shine	3
A4	Magnolia	2
B2	San Miguel	3
A3	Converge	2
A2	Meralco	0
B3	Barangay Ginebra	3

Semifinals (Best-of-7)
A1	TNT	4
B1	Rain or Shine	1
B2	San Miguel	2
B3	Barangay Ginebra	4

Finals (Best-of-7)
A1	TNT	4
B3	Barangay Ginebra	2

== Quarterfinals ==
The quarterfinals is a best-of-five playoff.

=== (A1) TNT vs. (B4) NLEX ===
RPTV

September 25
5:00 pm

Box score

TNT Tropang Giga 107, NLEX Road Warriors 102
Scoring by quarter: 24–29, 17–20, 32–22, 34–31
Pts: Hollis-Jefferson 45; Rebs: Hollis-Jefferson 10; Asts: Hollis-Jefferson 7	Pts: Jones 38; Rebs: Jones 12; Asts: Bolick 7

Ninoy Aquino Stadium, Manila
Referees: Jerry Narandan, James Paez, Janine Nicandro, Rommel Gruta

RPTV

September 27
7:30 pm

Box score

TNT Tropang Giga 90, NLEX Road Warriors 93
Scoring by quarter: 21–24, 19–16, 24–29, 26–24
Pts: Hollis-Jefferson 22; Rebs: Hollis-Jefferson 22; Asts: Hollis-Jefferson 5	Pts: Jones 38; Rebs: Jones 12; Asts: Bolick 5

Santa Rosa Sports Complex, Santa Rosa, Laguna
Referees: Peter Balao, Joel Baldago, Mardy Montoya, Bryan Peclaro

RPTV

September 29
5:00 pm

Box score

TNT Tropang Giga 109, NLEX Road Warriors 91
Scoring by quarter: 32–21, 29–19, 28–28, 20–23
Pts: Hollis-Jefferson 27; Rebs: Hollis-Jefferson 12; Asts: Hollis-Jefferson 8	Pts: Herndon 17; Rebs: Jones 10; Asts: Bolick 10

Ynares Center, Antipolo, Rizal
Referees: Rommel Gruta, Mardy Montoya, Mike Flordeliza, Karlo Vergara

RPTV

October 1
7:30 pm

Box score

TNT Tropang Giga 125, NLEX Road Warriors 96
Scoring by quarter: 35–25, 31–21, 29–28, 30–22
Pts: Hollis-Jefferson 35; Rebs: Hollis-Jefferson 11; Asts: Castro 4	Pts: Bolick 25; Rebs: Policarpio 6 Asts: Bolick 7
TNT wins series, 3–1

Ninoy Aquino Stadium, Manila
Referees: Bing Oliva, Jerry Narandan, Bryan Peclaro, James Paez

=== (B1) Rain or Shine vs. (A4) Magnolia ===
RPTV

September 25
7:30 pm

Box score

Rain or Shine Elasto Painters 109, Magnolia Chicken Timplados Hotshots 105
Scoring by quarter: 19–16, 32–34, 31–30, 27–25
Pts: Fuller 24; Rebs: Fuller 20; Asts: Fuller, Santillan 4	Pts: Rice 16; Rebs: Lee 9 Asts: Lee 13

Ninoy Aquino Stadium, Manila
Referees: Peter Balao, Mike Flordeliza, Albert Nubla, Joel Baldago

RPTV

September 27
5:00 pm

Box score

Rain or Shine Elasto Painters 69, Magnolia Chicken Timplados Hotshots 121
Scoring by quarter: 23–34, 5–32, 21–22, 20–33
Pts: Nocum 13; Rebs: Tiongson 6 Asts: Mamuyac 3	Pts: Bird 22; Rebs: Bird 13; Asts: Barroca 10

Santa Rosa Sports Complex, Santa Rosa, Laguna
Referees: Rey Yante, Rommel Gruta, Jerry Narandan, Jayson Vipinoso

RPTV

September 29
7:30 pm

Box score

Rain or Shine Elasto Painters 111, Magnolia Chicken Timplados Hotshots 106 (OT)
Scoring by quarter: 29–18, 21–20, 23–28, 25–32, Overtime: 13–8
Pts: Fuller 29; Rebs: Santillan 13; Asts: Fuller 6	Pts: Bird 31; Rebs: Abueva 15; Asts: Barroca 6

Ynares Center, Antipolo, Rizal
Referees: Rey Yante, Bing Oliva, Janine Nicandro, Irewin Traballo

RPTV

October 1
5:00 pm

Box score

Rain or Shine Elasto Painters 100, Magnolia Chicken Timplados Hotshots 129
Scoring by quarter: 26–26, 18–36, 35–37, 21–30
Pts: Fuller 22; Rebs: Fuller 10; Asts: seven players 2	Pts: Bird 30; Rebs: Mendoza 7 Asts: Barroca, Lee 6

Ninoy Aquino Stadium, Manila
Referees: Rommel Gruta, Mardy Montoya, Mike Flordeliza, Karlo Vergara

RPTV

October 5
7:30 pm

Box score

Rain or Shine Elasto Painters 113, Magnolia Chicken Timplados Hotshots 103
Scoring by quarter: 20–29, 32–26, 33–28, 28–20
Pts: Fuller 26; Rebs: Clarito 10; Asts: Pangilinan-Lemetti 6	Pts: Bird 23; Rebs: Bird 15; Asts: Lee 7
Rain or Shine wins series, 3–2

Ynares Center, Antipolo, Rizal
Referees: Rommel Gruta, Bing Oliva, Jerry Narandan, Janine Nicandro

=== (B2) San Miguel vs. (A3) Converge ===
RPTV

September 26
7:30 pm

Box score

San Miguel Beermen 102, Converge FiberXers 95
Scoring by quarter: 30–23, 25–27, 30–22, 17–23
Pts: Anosike 28; Rebs: Fajardo 16; Asts: Anosike, Perez 5	Pts: Jones 22; Rebs: Jones 12; Asts: Jones 4

Ninoy Aquino Stadium, Manila
Referees: Rey Yante, Mardy Montoya, Joel Baldago, Charlie Amparado

RPTV

September 28
5:00 pm

Box score

San Miguel Beermen 107, Converge FiberXers 100
Scoring by quarter: 23–25, 25–26, 30–21, 29–28
Pts: Anosike 41; Rebs: Fajardo 16; Asts: Perez 8	Pts: Jones 36; Rebs: Jones 12; Asts: Cabagnot 5

Araneta Coliseum, Quezon City
Referees: Bing Oliva, Mardy Montoya, Mike Flordeliza, John Francis Mira

RPTV

September 30
7:30 pm

Box score

San Miguel Beermen 112, Converge FiberXers 114
Scoring by quarter: 27–20, 26–24, 34–22, 25–48
Pts: Anosike 39; Rebs: Fajardo 16; Asts: Anosike, Ross 5	Pts: Arana 23; Rebs: Jones 14; Asts: Stockton 8

Ninoy Aquino Stadium, Manila
Referees: Peter Balao, Mike Flordeliza, Joel Baldago, Kenny Hallig

RPTV

October 4
7:30 pm

Box score

San Miguel Beermen 100, Converge FiberXers 114
Scoring by quarter: 29–31, 26–20, 24–37, 21–26
Pts: Anosike 35; Rebs: Fajardo 20; Asts: Cruz 5	Pts: Winston 26; Rebs: Arana 8 Asts: Stockton 8

Ninoy Aquino Stadium, Manila
Referees: Bing Oliva, Mardy Montoya, Jerry Narandan, Albert Nubla

RPTV

October 6
7:30 pm

Box score

San Miguel Beermen 109, Converge FiberXers 105
Scoring by quarter: 22–34, 32–23, 35–30, 20–18
Pts: Fajardo 40; Rebs: Fajardo 24; Asts: Perez 9	Pts: Jones 29; Rebs: Jones 17; Asts: Winston 10
San Miguel wins series, 3–2

Ynares Center, Antipolo, Rizal
Referees: Rommel Gruta, Mike Flordeliza, Janine Nicandro, Jeffrey Tantay

=== (A2) Meralco vs. (B3) Barangay Ginebra ===
RPTV

September 26
5:00 pm

Box score

Meralco Bolts 92, Barangay Ginebra San Miguel 99
Scoring by quarter: 24–28, 19–25, 28–20, 21–26
Pts: Hodge 23; Rebs: Durham 13; Asts: Newsome 6	Pts: Brownlee 29; Rebs: Brownlee 13; Asts: Brownlee 7

Ninoy Aquino Stadium, Manila
Referees: Bing Oliva, Mike Flordeliza, Albert Nubla, Irewin Traballo

RPTV

September 28
7:30 pm

Box score

Meralco Bolts 103, Barangay Ginebra San Miguel 104
Scoring by quarter: 21–28, 20–20, 34–31, 28–25
Pts: Durham 39; Rebs: Durham 14; Asts: Banchero, Hodge 7	Pts: Brownlee 39; Rebs: Brownlee 7 Asts: Brownlee 5

Araneta Coliseum, Quezon City
Referees: Peter Balao, Jerry Narandan, Jeffrey Tantay, James Paez

RPTV

September 30
5:00 pm

Box score

Meralco Bolts 106, Barangay Ginebra San Miguel 113
Scoring by quarter: 27–28, 29–19, 25–27, 25–39
Pts: Durham 38; Rebs: Durham 13; Asts: Banchero 8	Pts: Brownlee 23; Rebs: Aguilar 8 Asts: Abarrientos 6
Barangay Ginebra wins series, 3–0

Ninoy Aquino Stadium, Manila
Referees: Rommel Gruta, Mardy Montoya, Jerry Narandan, John Francis Mira

== Semifinals ==
The semifinals is a best-of-seven playoff.

=== (A1) TNT vs. (B1) Rain or Shine ===
RPTV

October 9
7:30 pm

Box score

TNT Tropang Giga 90, Rain or Shine Elasto Painters 81
Scoring by quarter: 22–24, 17–19, 36–23, 15–15
Pts: Hollis-Jefferson 26; Rebs: Hollis-Jefferson 13; Asts: Hollis-Jefferson 9	Pts: Fuller 18; Rebs: Fuller 21; Asts: Caracut, Mamuyac 4

PhilSports Arena, Pasig
Referees: Nol Quilinguen, Bing Oliva, Mardy Montoya, James Paez

RPTV

October 11
5:00 pm

Box score

TNT Tropang Giga 108, Rain or Shine Elasto Painters 91
Scoring by quarter: 17–21, 30–23, 38–21, 23–26
Pts: Hollis-Jefferson 23; Rebs: Oftana 14; Asts: Pogoy 6	Pts: Clarito 18; Rebs: Clarito 7 Asts: Caracut, Fuller 3

Araneta Coliseum, Quezon City
Referees: Peter Balao, Mardy Montoya, Mike Flordeliza, Jayson Vipinoso

RPTV

October 13
7:30 pm

Box score

TNT Tropang Giga 109, Rain or Shine Elasto Painters 110
Scoring by quarter: 27–23, 16–28, 35–35, 31–24
Pts: Erram 27; Rebs: Hollis-Jefferson 10; Asts: Hollis-Jefferson 11	Pts: Fuller 26; Rebs: Fuller 16; Asts: Mamuyac 5

Dasmariñas Arena, Dasmariñas, Cavite
Referees: Peter Balao, Bing Oliva, James Paez, Rommel Gruta

RPTV

October 16
5:00 pm

Box score

TNT Tropang Giga 81, Rain or Shine Elasto Painters 79
Scoring by quarter: 18–22, 21–17, 24–20, 18–20
Pts: Hollis-Jefferson 23; Rebs: Hollis-Jefferson 19; Asts: Hollis-Jefferson 5	Pts: Fuller 22; Rebs: Fuller 18; Asts: three players 4

Araneta Coliseum, Quezon City
Referees: Nol Quilinguen, Jerry Narandan, Jeffrey Tantay, Karlo Vergara

RPTV

October 18
7:30 pm

Box score

TNT Tropang Giga 113, Rain or Shine Elasto Painters 95
Scoring by quarter: 28–25, 28–14, 34–31, 23–25
Pts: Hollis-Jefferson 36; Rebs: Hollis-Jefferson 10; Asts: Hollis-Jefferson 9	Pts: Fuller 14; Rebs: Fuller 6 Asts: Pangilinan-Lemetti 4
TNT wins series, 4–1

Ynares Center, Antipolo, Rizal
Attendance: 10,039
Referees: Peter Balao, Bing Oliva, Mardy Montoya, Albert Nubla

=== (B2) San Miguel vs. (B3) Barangay Ginebra ===
RPTV

October 9
5:00 pm

Box score

San Miguel Beermen 105, Barangay Ginebra San Miguel 122
Scoring by quarter: 28–27, 30–36, 20–34, 27–25
Pts: Anosike 27; Rebs: Fajardo 16; Asts: Fajardo 7	Pts: Brownlee 33; Rebs: Brownlee, Holt 8 Asts: Thompson 10

PhilSports Arena, Pasig
Referees: Rommel Gruta, Jerry Narandan, Janine Nicandro, Jeffrey Tantay

RPTV

October 11
7:30 pm

Box score

San Miguel Beermen 131, Barangay Ginebra San Miguel 125 (OT)
Scoring by quarter: 22–24, 29–23, 34–29, 25–34, Overtime: 21–15
Pts: Anosike 35; Rebs: Fajardo 21; Asts: Perez 7	Pts: Brownlee 39; Rebs: Brownlee 15; Asts: Thompson 10

Araneta Coliseum, Quezon City
Referees: Bing Oliva, Jerry Narandan, Jeffrey Tantay, Bryan Peclaro

RPTV

October 13
5:00 pm

Box score

San Miguel Beermen 94, Barangay Ginebra San Miguel 99
Scoring by quarter: 20–25, 25–29, 27–22, 22–23
Pts: Anosike 32; Rebs: Fajardo 14; Asts: Perez 6	Pts: Brownlee 30; Rebs: Ahanmisi 11; Asts: Holt 7

Dasmariñas Arena, Dasmariñas, Cavite
Referees: Nol Quilinguen, Mardy Montoya, Albert Nubla, John Francis Mira

RPTV

October 16
7:30 pm

Box score

San Miguel Beermen 131, Barangay Ginebra San Miguel 121
Scoring by quarter: 34–28, 28–28, 37–29, 32–36
Pts: Fajardo 29; Rebs: Fajardo 16; Asts: Ross 9	Pts: Brownlee 49; Rebs: Brownlee 9 Asts: Thompson 8

Araneta Coliseum, Quezon City
Referees: Rommel Gruta, Bing Oliva, Janine Nicandro, Albert Nubla

RPTV

October 18
5:00 pm

Box score

San Miguel Beermen 92, Barangay Ginebra San Miguel 121
Scoring by quarter: 33–34, 17–29, 29–29, 13–29
Pts: Anosike 21; Rebs: Fajardo 18; Asts: Perez 4	Pts: Abarrientos 28; Rebs: Brownlee 9 Asts: Brownlee, Cu 7

Ynares Center, Antipolo, Rizal
Attendance: 10,039
Referees: Nol Quilinguen, Jerry Narandan, Jeffrey Tantay, James Paez

RPTV

October 20
7:30 pm

Box score

San Miguel Beermen 99, Barangay Ginebra San Miguel 102
Scoring by quarter: 27–23, 22–23, 26–30, 24–26
Pts: Anosike 30; Rebs: Fajardo 15; Asts: Perez 8	Pts: Ahanmisi 25; Rebs: Thompson 14; Asts: Brownlee 7
Barangay Ginebra wins series, 4–2

Araneta Coliseum, Quezon City
Referees: Rommel Gruta, Mardy Montoya, Mike Flordeliza, Janine Nicandro

== Finals ==
The finals is a best-of-seven playoff.

RPTV

October 27
7:30 pm

Box score

TNT Tropang Giga 104, Barangay Ginebra San Miguel 88

Ynares Center, Antipolo, Rizal

RPTV

October 30
7:30 pm

Box score

TNT Tropang Giga 96, Barangay Ginebra San Miguel 84

Araneta Coliseum, Quezon City

RPTV

November 1
7:30 pm

Box score

TNT Tropang Giga 73, Barangay Ginebra San Miguel 85

Araneta Coliseum, Quezon City

RPTV

November 3
7:35 pm

Box score

TNT Tropang Giga 92, Barangay Ginebra San Miguel 106

Araneta Coliseum, Quezon City

RPTV

November 6
7:30 pm

Box score

TNT Tropang Giga 99, Barangay Ginebra San Miguel 72

Araneta Coliseum, Quezon City

RPTV

November 8
7:30 pm

Box score

TNT Tropang Giga 95, Barangay Ginebra San Miguel 85
TNT wins series, 4–2

Araneta Coliseum, Quezon City

== Imports ==
The following is the list of imports, which had played for their respective teams at least once, with the returning imports in italics. Highlighted are the imports who stayed with their respective teams for the whole conference.

Team	Name	Debuted	Last game	Record	Ref.
Barangay Ginebra San Miguel	(United States) Justin Brownlee	August 24 (vs. Rain or Shine)	November 8 (vs. TNT)	15–10	
Blackwater Bossing	(United States) Ricky Ledo	August 20 (vs. Rain or Shine)	August 22 (vs. NLEX)	0–2	
Blackwater Bossing	No import	August 25 (vs. San Miguel)		0–1	
Blackwater Bossing	(United States) George King	August 30 (vs. Barangay Ginebra)	September 23 (vs. Rain or Shine)	5–2	
Converge FiberXers	(United States) Scotty Hopson	August 21 (vs. Terrafirma)	September 14 (vs. Terrafirma)	4–4	
Converge FiberXers	(United States) Jalen Jones	September 18 (vs. Meralco)	October 6 (vs. San Miguel)	4–3	
Magnolia Chicken Timplados Hotshots	(United States) Glenn Robinson III	August 18 (vs. Meralco)	September 4 (vs. NorthPort)	3–2	
Magnolia Chicken Timplados Hotshots	No import	September 7 (vs. Meralco), September 20 (vs. NorthPort)		1–1	
Magnolia Chicken Timplados Hotshots	(United States) Shabazz Muhammad	September 12 (vs. Terrafirma)	September 17 (vs. TNT)	1–1	
Magnolia Chicken Timplados Hotshots	(United States) Rayvonte Rice	September 23 (vs. Converge)	September 25 (vs. Rain or Shine)	0–2	
Magnolia Chicken Timplados Hotshots	(United States) Jabari Bird	September 27 (vs. Rain or Shine)	October 5 (vs. Rain or Shine)	2–2	
Meralco Bolts	(United States) Allen Durham	August 18 (vs. Magnolia)	September 30 (vs. Barangay Ginebra)	7–6	
NLEX Road Warriors	(United States) Myke Henry	August 22 (vs. Blackwater)	September 11 (vs. San Miguel)	3–4	
NLEX Road Warriors	(United States) DeQuan Jones	September 17 (vs. Rain or Shine)	October 1 (vs. TNT)	3–4	
NorthPort Batang Pier	(United States) Taylor Johns	August 20 (vs. TNT)		0–1	
NorthPort Batang Pier	(Australia) Venky Jois	August 23 (vs. Terrafirma)	September 14 (vs. Meralco)	3–3	
NorthPort Batang Pier	No import	September 4 (vs. Magnolia), September 20 (vs. Magnolia), September 22 (vs. TNT)		0–3	
Phoenix Fuel Masters	(United States) Jayveous McKinnis	August 21 (vs. San Miguel)	August 25 (vs. NLEX)	0–2	
Phoenix Fuel Masters	No import	August 30 (vs. Rain or Shine)		0–1	
Phoenix Fuel Masters	(Dominican Republic) Brandone Francis	September 3 (vs. Blackwater)	September 20 (vs. NLEX)	1–6	
Rain or Shine Elasto Painters	(United States) Aaron Fuller	August 20 (vs. Blackwater)	October 18 (vs. TNT)	11–9	
San Miguel Beermen	(United States) Jordan Adams	August 21 (vs. Phoenix)	September 19 (vs. Rain or Shine)	5–3	
San Miguel Beermen	(United States) Sheldon Mac	September 11 (vs. NLEX)		1–0	
San Miguel Beermen	No import	September 21 (vs. Blackwater)		0–1	
San Miguel Beermen	(Nigeria) E.J. Anosike	September 26 (vs. Converge)	October 20 (vs. Barangay Ginebra)	5–6	
Terrafirma Dyip	(United States) Antonio Hester	August 21 (vs. Converge)	September 21 (vs. Meralco)	1–9	
TNT Tropang Giga	(United States) Rondae Hollis-Jefferson	August 20 (vs. NorthPort)	November 8 (vs. Barangay Ginebra)	18–6	
TNT Tropang Giga	No import	September 22 (vs. NorthPort)		1–0	

== Awards ==
=== Player of the Week ===
Week	Player	Ref.
August 18–25	June Mar Fajardo (San Miguel Beermen)	
August 27 – September 1	Arvin Tolentino (NorthPort Batang Pier)	
September 3–8	Sedrick Barefield (Blackwater Bossing)	
September 10–15	Marcio Lassiter (San Miguel Beermen)	
September 17–23	Alec Stockton (Converge FiberXers)	
September 25–29	Jhonard Clarito (Rain or Shine Elasto Painters)	
October 9–13	Stephen Holt (Barangay Ginebra San Miguel)	
October 16–20	RJ Abarrientos (Barangay Ginebra San Miguel)	

=== Rookie of the Week ===
Week	Player	Ref.
August 18–25	Caelan Tiongson (Rain or Shine Elasto Painters)	
August 27 – September 1	Jonnel Policarpio (NLEX Road Warriors)	
September 10–15	Sedrick Barefield (Blackwater Bossing)	
September 17–23	CJ Cansino (Meralco Bolts)	

=== Reinforcement of the Week ===
Week	Player	Ref.
August 18–25	Rondae Hollis-Jefferson (TNT Tropang Giga)	
August 27 – September 1	Justin Brownlee (Barangay Ginebra San Miguel)	
September 10–15	Jordan Adams (San Miguel Beermen)	
September 17–23	George King (Blackwater Bossing)	

== Statistics ==
=== Local players ===
Category	Player	Team	Statistic
Points per game	Arvin Tolentino	NorthPort Batang Pier	23.7
Rebounds per game	June Mar Fajardo	San Miguel Beermen	15.0
Assists per game	Robert Bolick	NLEX Road Warriors	8.6
Steals per game	Joshua Munzon	NorthPort Batang Pier	2.8
Blocks per game	Zavier Lucero	Magnolia Chicken Timplados Hotshots	1.3
Turnovers per game	Juami Tiongson	Terrafirma Dyip	3.5
Fouls per game	Jason Perkins	Phoenix Fuel Masters	3.4
Fouls per game	Alec Stockton	Converge FiberXers	3.4
Minutes per game	Arvin Tolentino	NorthPort Batang Pier	38.9
FG%	June Mar Fajardo	San Miguel Beermen	68.5%
FT%	Paul Lee	Magnolia Chicken Timplados Hotshots	95.5%
3FG%	Felix Pangilinan-Lemetti	Rain or Shine Elasto Painters	58.7%
4FG%	Jerrick Ahanmisi	Magnolia Chicken Timplados Hotshots	41.9%
Double-doubles	June Mar Fajardo	San Miguel Beermen	20
Triple-doubles	Arvin Tolentino	NorthPort Batang Pier	1
Triple-doubles	Scottie Thompson	Barangay Ginebra San Miguel	1

==== Import players ====
Category	Player	Team	Statistic
Points per game	George King	Blackwater Bossing	40.3
Rebounds per game	Aaron Fuller	Rain or Shine Elasto Painters	17.0
Assists per game	Rondae Hollis-Jefferson	TNT Tropang Giga	6.2
Steals per game	Rondae Hollis-Jefferson	TNT Tropang Giga	2.7
Blocks per game	Rondae Hollis-Jefferson	TNT Tropang Giga	2.1
Turnovers per game	Brandone Francis	Phoenix Fuel Masters	4.1
Turnovers per game	George King	Blackwater Bossing	4.1
Fouls per game	Allen Durham	Meralco Bolts	2.8
Minutes per game	Rondae Hollis-Jefferson	TNT Tropang Giga	42.6
FG%	Aaron Fuller	Rain or Shine Elasto Painters	60.9%
FT%	George King	Blackwater Bossing	85.2%
3FG%	Justin Brownlee	Barangay Ginebra San Miguel	54.1%
4FG%	DeQuan Jones	NLEX Road Warriors	64.3%
Double-doubles	Rondae Hollis-Jefferson	TNT Tropang Giga	20
Triple-doubles	Justin Brownlee	Barangay Ginebra San Miguel	1
Triple-doubles	Rondae Hollis-Jefferson	TNT Tropang Giga	1

=== Individual game highs ===
==== Local players ====
Category	Player	Team	Statistic
Points	Arvin Tolentino	NorthPort Batang Pier	51
Rebounds	June Mar Fajardo (twice)	San Miguel Beermen	24
Assists	Robert Bolick	NLEX Road Warriors	15
Steals	Cade Flores	NorthPort Batang Pier	6
Blocks	Zavier Lucero	Magnolia Chicken Timplados Hotshots	4
Three point field goals	Aris Dionisio	Magnolia Chicken Timplados Hotshots	9
Four point field goals	Jerrick Ahanmisi	Magnolia Chicken Timplados Hotshots	4

==== Import players ====
Category	Player	Team	Statistic
Points	George King	Blackwater Bossing	64
Rebounds	Aaron Fuller	Rain or Shine Elasto Painters	25
Rebounds	Rondae Hollis-Jefferson	TNT Tropang Giga	25
Assists	Rondae Hollis-Jefferson	TNT Tropang Giga	11
Steals	Rondae Hollis-Jefferson	TNT Tropang Giga	9
Blocks	Justin Brownlee	Barangay Ginebra San Miguel	5
Blocks	Rondae Hollis-Jefferson	TNT Tropang Giga	5
Three point field goals	Jordan Adams	San Miguel Beermen	6
Three point field goals	Rondae Hollis-Jefferson	TNT Tropang Giga	6
Four point field goals	Justin Brownlee	Barangay Ginebra San Miguel	5

=== Team statistical leaders ===
Category	Team	Statistic
Points per game	San Miguel Beermen	115.7
Rebounds per game	Meralco Bolts	55.0
Assists per game	Rain or Shine Elasto Painters	26.4
Steals per game	NorthPort Batang Pier	10.7
Blocks per game	Rain or Shine Elasto Painters	4.6
Turnovers per game	NorthPort Batang Pier	17.2
Fouls per game	Converge FiberXers	25.6
FG%	San Miguel Beermen	49.1%
FT%	San Miguel Beermen	78.7%
3FG%	San Miguel Beermen	37.2%
4FG%	Phoenix Fuel Masters	29.8%

== Final rankings ==
Pos	Team	Pld	W	L	Best finish
1	TNT Tropang Giga (C)	25	19	6	Champion
2	Barangay Ginebra San Miguel	25	15	10	Runner-up
3	Rain or Shine Elasto Painters	20	11	9	Semifinalist
4	San Miguel Beermen	21	11	10	Semifinalist
5	Meralco Bolts	13	7	6	Quarterfinalist
6	Converge FiberXers	15	8	7	Quarterfinalist
7	Magnolia Chicken Timplados Hotshots	15	7	8	Quarterfinalist
8	NLEX Road Warriors	14	6	8	Quarterfinalist
9	Blackwater Bossing	10	5	5	Elimination round
10	NorthPort Batang Pier	10	3	7	Elimination round
11	Terrafirma Dyip	10	1	9	Elimination round
12	Phoenix Fuel Masters	10	1	9	Elimination round

Rules for classification: 1) finals result, 2) elimination round seed of semifinalists, 3) elimination round seed of quarterfinalists, 4) elimination round finish
(C) Champions

== See also ==
- Four-point field goal
