= Duncan Reid =

Hong Kong-Canadian basketball player (born 1989)

Duncan Reid 惠龍兒
Free agent
- Position: Power forward / Centre

Personal information
- Born: 28 September 1989 (age 37) British Hong Kong
- Listed height: 6 ft 9 in (2.06 m)
- Listed weight: 220 lb (100 kg)

Career information
- College: University of Guelph
- Playing career: 2007–present

Career history
- 2007–2009: On Ching
- 2009–2010: Fukien
- 2011–2017: South China
- 2017–2018: Zhejiang Golden Bulls
- 2018–2019: Nanjing Tongxi Monkey Kings
- 2019–2022: South China
- 2022–2023: Bay Area Dragons
- 2025–2026: Tycoon

Career highlights
- 5× Hong Kong A1 Division champion (2012, 2013, 2016, 2017, 2019); 2× Hong Kong A1 Division MVP (2016, 2017)

Duncan Overbeck Reid (Chinese: 惠龍兒; born 28 September 1989) is a Hong Kong-Canadian professional basketball player who last played for the Tycoon team of the Hong Kong A1 Division.

== Professional career ==
He has played for South China in the A1 Division Hong Kong and the FIBA Asia Champions Cup. Reid was drafted third overall in the 2017 CBA Draft by the Zhejiang Golden Bulls.

He has reportedly been signed by the Hong Kong team, Tycoon, to be part of their roster for the 2025 season.

== National team career ==
He represented the Hong Kong national team at the 2015 FIBA Asia Championship in Changsha, China, where he recorded the most points, rebounds, assists and blocks for his team. In 2017, he produced averages of 11.7 points and 8.7 rebounds per game at the competition.
