= Dominic Gilbert =

Australian-Croatian basketball player

No. 0 – Winling
- Position: Forward
- League: HKA1

Personal information
- Born: 28 February 1996 (age 30) Hong Kong
- Listed height: 198 cm (6 ft 6 in)
- Listed weight: 98 kg (216 lb)

Career information
- College: UBC (2015–2016)
- NBA draft: 2018: undrafted
- Playing career: 2016–present

Career history
- 2016–2017: Kvarner 2010
- 2017: Šanac Karlovac
- 2017: South China
- 2017–2019: Cibona
- 2017–2018: → Bosco
- 2018: South China
- 2019–2020: Zadar
- 2021: Heroes Den Bosch
- 2021: ADA Blois
- 2021–2022: Alkar
- 2022: Real Valladolid
- 2022: Sutherland Sharks
- 2022: Real Valladolid
- 2022–2024: Hong Kong Eastern
- 2024–2025: Zadar
- 2025–2026: Hong Kong Eastern
- 2026: → South China
- 2026–present: Winling

Career highlights
- 2× Croatian League champion (2019, 2025); ASEAN Basketball League champion (2023); 2× Hong Kong A1 Division champion (2024, 2026); Croatian Cup winner (2020)

Dominic Gilbert (born 28 September 1996) is an Australian-Croatian professional basketball player for the Winling of the Hong Kong A1 Division Championship (HKA1) . Standing 1.98 metres (6.5 ft) tall, he plays in forward positions.

== Early life and professional career ==
Gilbert was born in Hong Kong, where his parents lived for several years. He was raised in Sydney, Australia. He studied at the University of British Columbia in Vancouver, Canada when he decided to pursue a career in professional basketball in Croatia, country of his mother's origin.

After playing in Kvarner 2010 and Šanac Karlovac, in 2017 he signed for Cibona. In May 2019, he scored the decisive points in the last moments of the 4th game of the final series of the 2018–19 Croatian League, taking the title for Cibona.

In August 2019, he signed for Zadar, continuing to play in the Croatian League and ABA League.

In December, 2020, unsatisfied with his status in Zadar, Gilbert moved to Heroes Den Bosch of the Dutch Basketball League.

Gilbert played for Heroes Den Bosch until June 2021, when he moved to the French ADA Blois. After playing only four games in the LNB Pro B, in August, 2021, Gilbert moved back to Croatia, signing with Alkar.

On February 23, 2022, he has signed with Real Valladolid of the Spanish LEB Oro.

On July 1, 2024, in was announced that Gilbert is returning to Zadar of the Croatian League and ABA League.
