= Rondae Hollis-Jefferson =

American basketball player (born 1995)

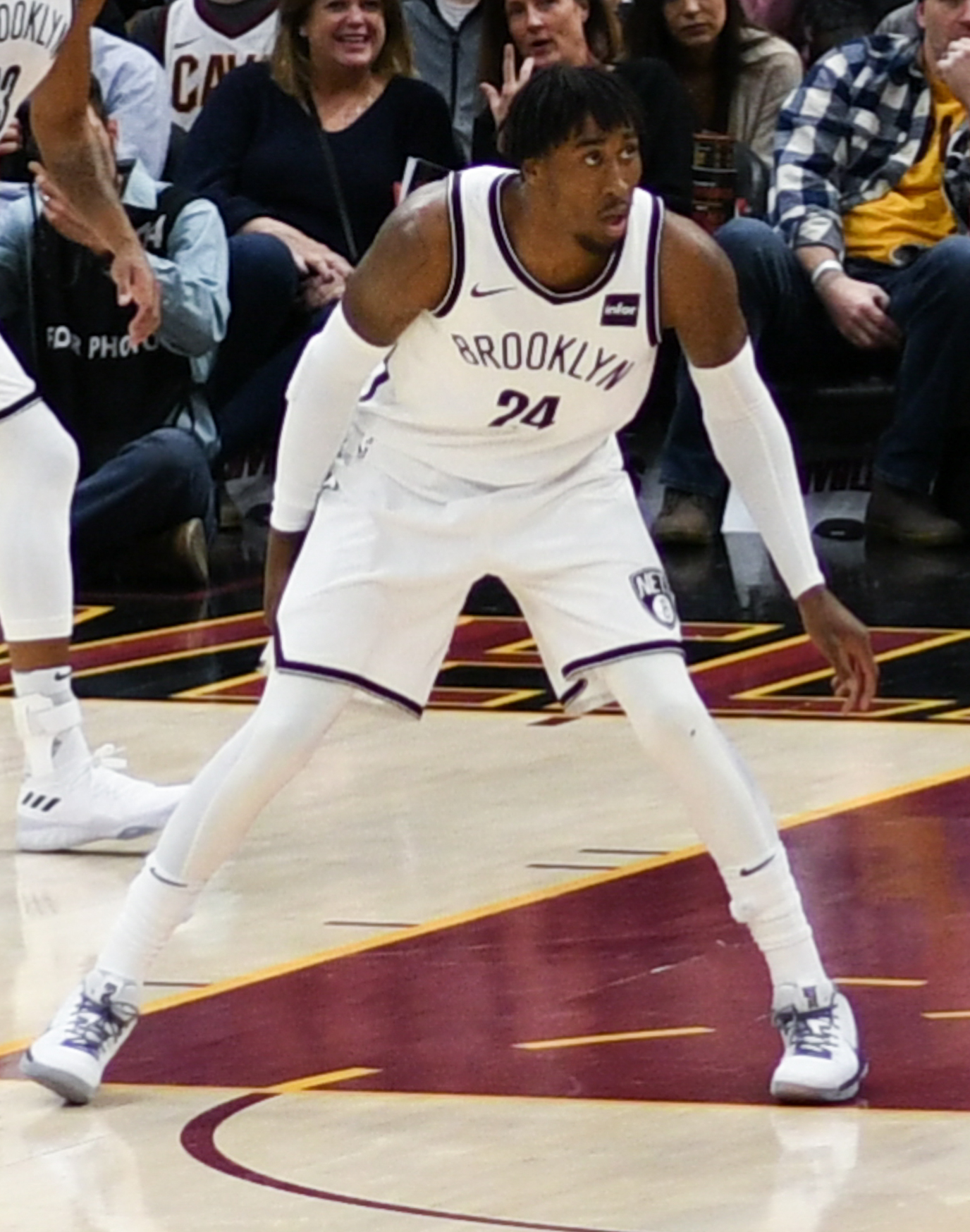
- Hollis-Jefferson with the Brooklyn Nets in 2018

No. 24 – TNT Tropang 5G
- Position: Power forward / small forward
- League: PBA

Personal information
- Born: January 3, 1995 (age 31) Chester, Pennsylvania, U.S.
- Listed height: 6 ft 6 in (1.98 m)
- Listed weight: 217 lb (98 kg)

Career information
- High school: Chester (Chester, Pennsylvania)
- College: Arizona (2013–2015)
- NBA draft: 2015: 1st round, 23rd overall pick
- Drafted by: Portland Trail Blazers
- Playing career: 2015–present

Career history
- 2015–2019: Brooklyn Nets
- 2019–2020: Toronto Raptors
- 2021: Portland Trail Blazers
- 2021–2022: Beşiktaş Icrypex
- 2022–2023: Atléticos de San Germán
- 2022–2023: Jeonju KCC Egis
- 2023, 2024–2025: TNT Tropang Giga/5G
- 2024: Mets de Guaynabo
- 2025: Meralco Bolts
- 2026–present: TNT Tropang 5G

Career highlights
- 3× PBA champion (2023 Governors', 2024 Governors', 2024–25 Commissioner's); 3× PBA Best Import of the Conference (2023 Governors', 2024 Governors', 2024–25 Commissioner's); First-team All-Pac-12 (2015); Pac-12 All-Defensive Team (2015); Pac-12 All-Freshman Team (2014); McDonald's All-American (2013)
- Stats at NBA.com
- Stats at Basketball Reference
Medals
Men's basketball
Representing Jordan
Asian Games
Silver medal – second place	2022 Hangzhou	Team
Men's 3x3 basketball
Representing United States
FIBA Under-18 World Cup
Silver medal – second place	2012 Spain	Team
FIBA Under-18 World Cup Dunk Contest
Bronze medal – third place	2012 Spain	Individual

Rondae Jaquan Hollis-Jefferson (born January 3, 1995) is an American-born naturalized Jordanian professional basketball player for the TNT Tropang 5G of the Philippine Basketball Association (PBA). After playing college basketball for the Arizona Wildcats, he was selected by the Portland Trail Blazers of the National Basketball Association (NBA) in the 2015 NBA draft, and spent six seasons with the NBA before playing for four different basketball teams outside the United States. He has won three Philippine Basketball Association championships as part of the TNT Tropang Giga, and three-time Best Import of the Conference (2023 PBA Governors' Cup, 2024 PBA Governors' Cup and the 2024–25 PBA Commissioner's Cup).

== Early life ==
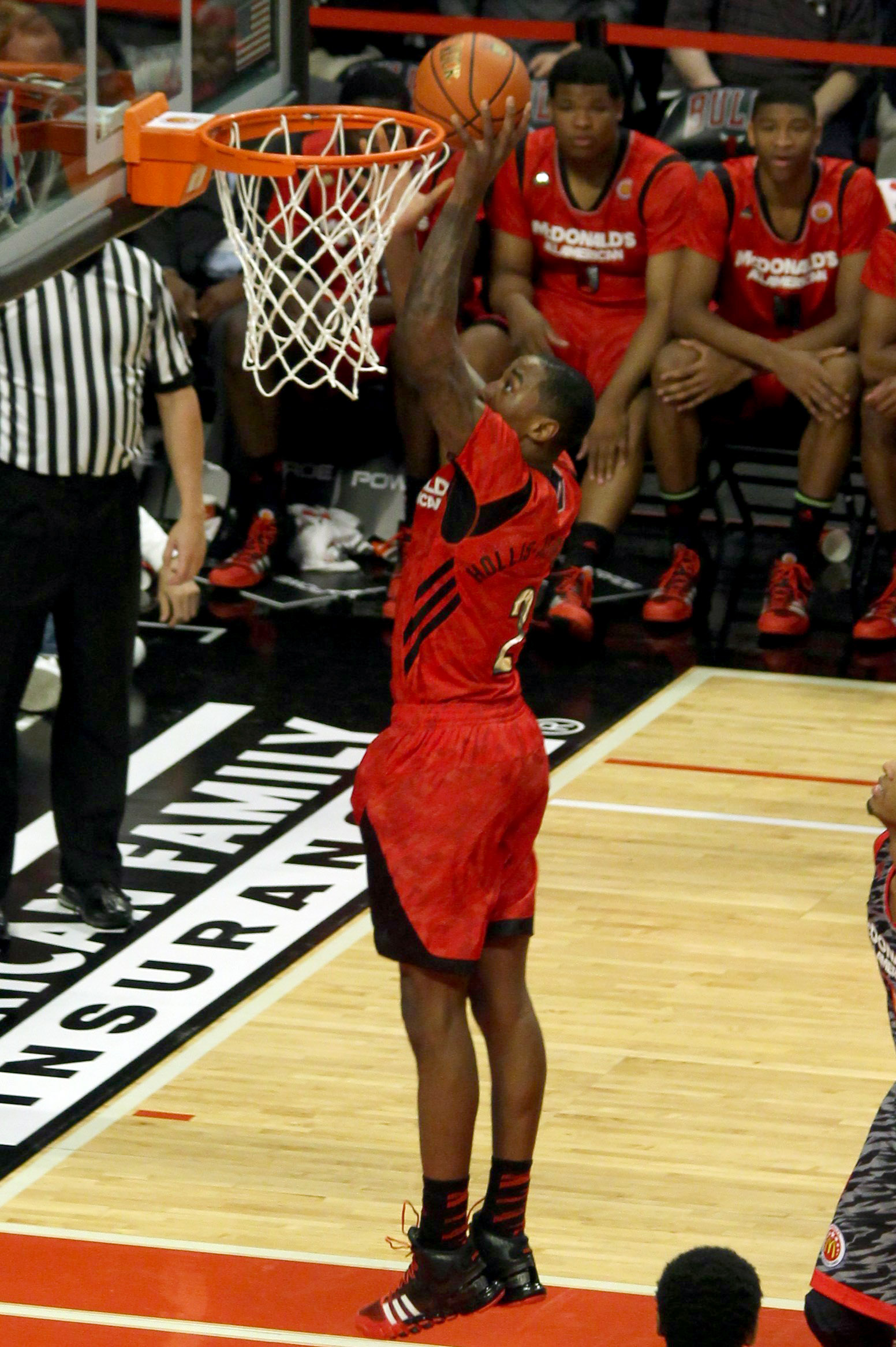
Hollis-Jefferson in the 2013 McDonald's All-American Boys Game

Hollis-Jefferson was born and raised in Chester, Pennsylvania, the son of Rylanda Hollis, a single mother who worked two jobs as a dietary supervisor and bartender. He grew up with older brother Rahlir, who also became a professional basketball player. Their father was frequently absent and spent some time in jail. Hollis-Jefferson began honing his game when he was 12. At a young age he took a strong interest in defense and acknowledged that he scored only because he was taller than his peers.

He attended Chester High School where he began an outstanding basketball career under head coach Larry Yarbray. The small forward became the first player to ever be named Delaware County Player of the Year for multiple seasons. He was also instrumental in Chester's first-ever undefeated season. The Clippers finished 91–5 in his last three years at the school and won two state titles. In his senior year, he lost in the state title game to Lower Merion. He finished his career with more than 1,000 points and a school-record 780 rebounds.

Hollis-Jefferson participated in the 2013 McDonald's All-American Game against future Arizona teammate, Aaron Gordon. Following the event, he took part in the Jordan Brand Classic with some of the most highly recruited high school stars in the nation such as Julius Randle. At the conclusion of Hollis-Jefferson's years with the Clippers, he was tabbed the sixth-best small forward of his class by 247Sports.com and the fifth best by Rivals.com. He eventually chose to attend the University of Arizona and represent the school through their successful basketball program over other possibilities such as Florida and Syracuse.

College recruiting
Name	Hometown	School	Height	Weight	Commit date
Rondae Hollis-Jefferson; SF	Chester, PA	Chester High School	6 ft 7 in (2.01 m)	212 lb (96 kg)	Sep 13, 2012
Rondae Hollis-Jefferson; SF	Recruit ratings: Scout: Rivals: 247Sports: ESPN:				

== College career ==
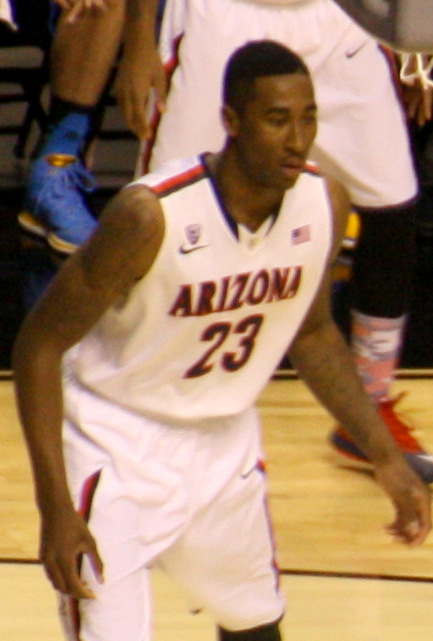
Hollis-Jefferson playing for Arizona in March 2014

In his freshman season with Arizona, Hollis-Jefferson became known as fierce scorer, rebounder, and shot-blocker despite his relatively small size. The start of his season was marked with 10 points, 5 rebounds, and 2 assists against Cal Poly off the bench. He posted his first double-double in a game against Oregon. He improved on his free throw shooting as his freshman year progressed. Throughout the season, Hollis-Jefferson mainly functioned as the team's sixth man, but became a starter after Brandon Ashley was lost for the season with a foot injury in the Wildcats' 60–58 upset loss to California on February 1. Hollis-Jefferson ended up starting 6 of 38 games played due to the roster that was dominated by the likes of Aaron Gordon, but still got his name on the Pac-12 All-Freshman Team. In his freshman year, Hollis-Jefferson averaged 9.1 points, 5.7 rebounds, and 1.4 assists per game. "It's a lot different than just waking up, going to school and playing basketball for Chester," said Hollis-Jefferson of his freshman year. "In the beginning of the season, I was lost. But it's not about who's starting, it's about who finishes. It stuck with me for about a month or so, playing behind people. I went along with it and kept playing. I need to make people respect my shot. I know I can shoot it. I have to stay in attack mode."

As a sophomore, Hollis-Jefferson increased his averages to 11.3 points and 6.9 rebounds per game. He improved in his leadership and offense. As a sophomore, he was voted first-team All-Pac-12, and was named to the Pac-12 All-Defensive Team. He helped lead the Wildcats to two consecutive Elite Eight appearances in the NCAA tournament, losing to Wisconsin on both occasions. On April 7, 2015, Hollis-Jefferson declared for the 2015 NBA draft, forgoing his final two years of college eligibility. "I don't know if I've enjoyed coaching a player more than I've enjoyed coaching Rondae," coach Sean Miller said.

=== Awards and honors ===
- NCAA Tournament West Region All-Tournament Team (2015)
- First-team All-Pac-12 (2015)
- Pac-12 All-Tournament Team (2015)
- Pac-12 All-Defensive Team (2015)
- Pac-12 Player of the Week (2015)
- Pac-12 All-Freshman Team (2014)
- Maui Invitational All-Tournament Team (2014)

== Professional career ==
=== Brooklyn Nets (2015–2019) ===
On June 25, 2015, Hollis-Jefferson was selected by the Portland Trail Blazers with the 23rd overall pick in the 2015 NBA draft. His draft rights, along with Steve Blake, were subsequently traded to the Brooklyn Nets for Mason Plumlee and the draft rights to the 41st overall pick, Pat Connaughton. On July 6, 2015, he signed his rookie-scale contract with the Nets. He made his debut for the Nets in their season opener on October 28, 2015, recording eight points and five rebounds off the bench in a 115–100 loss to the Chicago Bulls. On November 20, he had a season-best game with 13 points and 11 rebounds as a starter in a loss to the Boston Celtics. On December 7, he was diagnosed with a non-displaced fracture of the posterior talus in his right ankle, an injury requiring surgery and eight to ten weeks of rehabilitation. He returned to action in late March.

On November 12, 2016, Hollis-Jefferson scored a then career-high 20 points and tied a career high with 13 rebounds in a 122–104 win over the Phoenix Suns.

On December 14, 2017, Hollis-Jefferson scored a career-high 25 points on 10-for-16 shooting in a 111–104 loss to the New York Knicks. He strained his right groin during a 116–91 loss to the Milwaukee Bucks on January 26, returning to action on February 26 against the Chicago Bulls after missing the Nets' previous 11 games.

Hollis-Jefferson missed the first three games of the 2018–19 season with a hip injury and the birth of his first child. On November 28, 2018, in a 101–91 loss to the Utah Jazz, Hollis-Jefferson had 14 points and a season-high 11 rebounds for his first double-double. On March 19, 2019, he made a layup with eight-tenths of a second remaining to lift the Nets to a 123–121 win over the Sacramento Kings.

On June 17, the Nets opted not to make Hollis-Jefferson a qualifying offer, making him an unrestricted free agent.

=== Toronto Raptors (2019–2020) ===
On July 18, 2019, Hollis-Jefferson signed with the defending champion, Toronto Raptors.

On December 3, 2020, Hollis-Jefferson signed a non-guaranteed preseason contract with the Minnesota Timberwolves. He was waived by the Timberwolves shortly after he signed on December 19, 2020.

=== Portland Trail Blazers (2021) ===
On April 8, 2021, Hollis-Jefferson signed a 10-day contract with the Portland Trail Blazers. On April 18, he signed a second 10-day contract and 10 days later, he signed for the rest of the season after appearing in six games.

=== Beşiktaş (2021–2022) ===
On September 28, 2021, Hollis-Jefferson signed with Beşiktaş Icrypex of the Basketbol Süper Ligi. He scored a career-high 26 points in a 69–82 loss over the Rytas.

=== Atléticos de San Germán (2022) ===
On April 11, 2022, Hollis-Jefferson signed with Atléticos de San Germán of the Baloncesto Superior Nacional. He played 31 games and averaged 19.7 points per game. On May 16, 2023, Hollis-Jefferson was brought back by Atléticos de San Germán. He played 22 games and averaged 21.7 points per game.

=== TNT Tropang Giga (2023–2024) ===
In February 2023, Hollis-Jefferson signed with the TNT Tropang Giga of the Philippine Basketball Association (PBA) to replace Jalen Hudson as the team's import for the 2023 PBA Governors' Cup. He played 16 games and averaged 30.4 points per game. On May 30, 2023, it was announced that Hollis-Jefferson will return as the team's import for the 2023–24 PBA Commissioner's Cup.

=== Mets de Guaynabo (2024) ===
On February 12, 2024, Hollis-Jefferson joined the Mets de Guaynabo after a trade with San Germán.

=== TNT Tropang Giga (2024–present) ===
In August 2024, Hollis-Jefferson returns to TNT as the team's import for the 2024 PBA Governors' Cup. He helped the team clinch their second consecutive Governors' Cup title, scoring 31 points in a series-clinching 95–85 victory against the Barangay Ginebra San Miguel in Game 6 of the Governors' Cup finals. After the championship in Governos' Cup, Hollis-Jefferson helped TNT captured the Commissioner's Cup against Barangay Ginebra in Finals Game 7, giving TNT a back-to-back championships in one season. Hollis-Jefferson received His 3rd Best Import of the Conference award. In April 2025, Hollis-Jefferson signed 1-year "exclusive" contract for the TNT. In September 2025, TNT allowed Hollis-Jefferson to play for its sister-team Meralco Bolts for their campaign on East Asia Super League.

=== Meralco Bolts (2025) ===
On September 11, 2025, Hollis-Jefferson joined the Meralco Bolts of the East Asia Super League as an import. In a December 6 game against the Macau Black Bears, Hollis-Jefferson suffered a ruptured Achilles tendon, ending his season.

== Philanthropy and community work ==
In June 2025, Hollis-Jefferson launched RHJ on Tour, a nationwide grassroots basketball initiative in the Philippines in partnership with TNT Tropang Giga/5G and Smart Communications. The tour was developed as a "give-back" program to mark the 25th anniversary of the TNT franchise and aimed to provide free, professional-level training to young athletes in underserved areas.

The clinics ran every weekend through July 2025, reaching over 500 youth participants across nine major stops. Hollis-Jefferson was joined by a coaching staff of PBA veterans, including Jayson Castro, Ranidel de Ocampo, Bong Ravena, and team manager Jojo Lastimosa.

Locations for the tour included:

Luzon: Quezon City, Batangas, Vigan, and Baguio. Visayas: Cebu City, Bacolod, and Iloilo City.

The curriculum emphasized a "holistic" approach to sports, blending technical skills like footwork and shooting with motivational talks on the importance of education, family respect, and discipline.

The initiative was chronicled in a documentary-style series titled RHJ on Tour, produced by Smart Sports and released on YouTube. The series focused on the regional basketball cultures of the Philippines, such as the historic basketball roots in Cebu and the community-driven "teamwork beyond the game" in Vigan.

Hollis-Jefferson further demonstrated his commitment to the local community in late 2025 by pledging his PBA Best Import cash prize to the Alagang Kapatid Foundation to support typhoon relief efforts.

== National team career ==
On July 24, 2023, the Jordan Basketball Federation announced that Hollis-Jefferson had been contracted to play for the national side as a naturalized player. On August 16, 2023, he was included in Jordan's 17-man squad for the 2023 FIBA Basketball World Cup. On August 28, 2023, Hollis-Jefferson drew comparisons to the late Kobe Bryant for his play with the Jordan national team during the 2023 FIBA Basketball World Cup.

The Samahang Basketball ng Pilipinas of the Philippines also offered Hollis-Jefferson to play for their national team but he eventually chose Jordan.

== Player profile ==
Hollis-Jefferson plays both forward positions. Using his athleticism and 7-foot-2-inch (2.18 m) wingspan, he is part of the NBA trend of undersized power forwards.

== Career statistics ==
Legend
GP	Games played	GS	Games started	MPG	Minutes per game
FG%	Field goal percentage	3P%	3-point field goal percentage	FT%	Free throw percentage
RPG	Rebounds per game	APG	Assists per game	SPG	Steals per game
BPG	Blocks per game	PPG	Points per game	**Bold**	Career high

=== NBA ===
==== Regular season ====
Year	Team	GP	GS	MPG	FG%	3P%	FT%	RPG	APG	SPG	BPG	PPG
2015–16	Brooklyn	29	17	21.2	.457	**.286**	.712	5.3	1.5	**1.3**	.6	5.8
2016–17	Brooklyn	**78**	50	22.6	.434	.224	.751	5.8	2.0	1.1	.6	8.7
2017–18	Brooklyn	68	**59**	**28.2**	.472	.241	**.788**	**6.8**	**2.5**	1.0	**.7**	**13.9**
2018–19	Brooklyn	59	21	20.9	.411	.184	.645	5.3	1.6	.7	.5	8.9
2019–20	Toronto	60	6	18.7	.471	.130	.734	4.7	1.8	.8	.4	7.0
2020–21	Portland	11	1	9.7	**.500**	.000	.563	2.4	1.2	.2	.4	2.5
Career		305	154	22.2	.449	.212	.735	5.5	1.9	.9	.5	9.0

==== Playoffs ====
Year	Team	GP	GS	MPG	FG%	3P%	FT%	RPG	APG	SPG	BPG	PPG
2019	Brooklyn	4	0	**15.5**	.485	**1.000**	**.800**	**3.0**	**1.5**	.3	**1.3**	13.3
2020	Toronto	**5**	0	7.8	.400	.000	.750	2.0	.6	**.4**	.2	2.8
2021	Portland	**5**	0	7.2	**.800**	.000	.667	1.6	.0	.2	.2	2.0
Career		14	0	9.8	.500	.500	.778	2.1	.6	.3	.5	5.5

=== College ===
Year	Team	GP	GS	MPG	FG%	3P%	FT%	RPG	APG	SPG	BPG	PPG
2013–14	Arizona	**38**	6	25.3	.490	.200	.682	5.7	1.4	.7	**1.1**	9.1
2014–15	Arizona	**38**	**25**	**28.7**	**.502**	**.207**	**.707**	**6.8**	**1.5**	**1.1**	.8	**11.2**
Career		76	31	27.0	.496	.205	.697	6.3	1.5	.9	.9	10.2

== Personal life ==
Hollis-Jefferson is a practicing Muslim and pescetarian.
