= E. J. Anosike =

American basketball player (born 1998)

No. 3 – Hangzhou Jingwei
- Position: Power forward
- League: NBL

Personal information
- Born: November 11, 1998 (age 28) Staten Island, New York, U.S.
- Listed height: 6 ft 7 in (2.01 m)
- Listed weight: 248 lb (112 kg)

Career information
- High school: Paramus Catholic (Paramus, New Jersey)
- College: Sacred Heart (2017–2019); Tennessee (2020–2021); Cal State Fullerton (2021–2022)
- NBA draft: 2022: undrafted
- Playing career: 2022–present

Career history
- 2022: Suwon KT Sonicboom
- 2023: Salt Lake City Stars
- 2023: Texas Legends
- 2023: Winnipeg Sea Bears
- 2023: Chorale Roanne
- 2023–2024: Liège
- 2024: Hefei Crazy Storm
- 2024: San Miguel Beermen
- 2024–2025: BC Oostende
- 2025: Petro de Luanda
- 2025: Shijiazhuang Xianglan
- 2025–2026: Hong Kong Bulls
- 2026–presnt: Hangzhou Jingwei

Career highlights
- NBL champion (2026); NBL Finals MVP (2026); NBL Slam Dunk Contest Champion (2026); NBL All-Star (2026); NBL Best International Player of the Regular Season (2025); NBL All-Star (2025); NBL–China scoring leader (2024); First-team All-NEC (2020)

Ejimofor "E. J." Anosike (born November 11, 1998) is a Nigerian-American professional basketball player for the Hangzhou Jingwei of the National Basketball League (NBL). He played college basketball for the Sacred Heart Pioneers, Tennessee Volunteers, and Cal State Fullerton Titans.

== Early life and high school career ==
Anosike was born in Staten Island, New York and raised in East Orange, New Jersey. Anosike played at Paramus Catholic High School in Paramus, New Jersey, where he scored over 1,000 career points and earned All-North and All-Bergen honors. He spent a post-graduate year at St. Thomas Moore School in Connecticut, where he was named All-NEPSAC Honorable Mention.

== College career ==
=== Sacred Heart University (2017–2020) ===
After graduating from St. Thomas More, Anosike enrolled at Sacred Heart University to play Division I basketball for head coach Anthony Latina and the Pioneers. As a freshman at Sacred Heart, Anosike averaged 4.2 points and 3.9 rebounds a game, appearing in 30 games.

Anosike recorded the first double-double of his collegiate career with 14 points and 16 rebounds against Mitchell College on November 22, 2017.

During the 2018-19 season, Anosike averaged 14.3 points and 8.1 rebounds per game, en route to earning NEC Most Improved Player of the Year honors and NEC All-Second Team recognition. That season, Anosike led the Pioneers and ranked second in the NEC in rebounding, and led the conference in offensive rebounds per game. He notched seven double-doubles over the season, led the team in rebounding in 15 contests, and reached double figures in scoring in 25 games. Anosike recorded a career-high 27 points vs. St. Francis Brooklyn; a double-double of 20 points and 14 rebounds vs. CCSU; 22 points vs. Boston College; and a 17-point, 16-rebound effort against Brown.

As a junior in the 2019-20 season, Anosike averaged 15.7 points and 11.6 rebounds per game over 33 games started, en route to earning NEC All-First Team honors. That season Anosike ranked in the top-20 in all of Div. 1 in total rebounds, defensive and offensive rebounds per game, and double-doubles.

Anosike graduated in three years from Sacred Heart, departing the program with 1,098 points and on track to over 1,000 career rebounds. After graduating from Sacred Heart, Anosike entered the NCAA transfer portal on April 9, 2021 and was regarded as the No. 6 available graduate transfer by ESPN.com, ranking among the top available players in the country. Anosike led Sacred Heart to its first postseason win in 11 seasons and ranked second among Division I men's players in rebounds and fourth in total rebounds.

=== Tennessee (2020–21) ===
Transferred to Tennessee, ranking 6th nationally in rebounding. He earned a Master’s degree in Agricultural & Resource Economics from the University of Tennessee in May 2021.

=== Cal State Fullerton (2021–22) ===
During the 2021-22 season, Anosike started all 32 season games. He averaged 16.3 points and 8.3 rebounds per game—a team-high—and helped lead the Cal State Fullerton Titans to a Big West Championship and NCAA Tournament appearances. His performance earned him Big West Newcomer of the Year honors and First Team All-Big West recognition. He was also named the 2022 Big West Tournament Most Valuable Player after helping lead Cal State Fullerton to the conference title and an NCAA Tournament berth.

Beyond conference honors, Anosike was selected to the 2022 Lou Henson All-America Team and played in the Reese’s Division I College All-Star Game at the 2022 Final Four.

=== College statistics ===
NCAA Division I statistics
Season	Team	GP	MPG	FG%	3P%	FT%	RPG	APG	SPG	BPG	PPG
2017–18	Sacred Heart	30	13.8	.382	.000	.707	3.9	0.4	0.2	0.5	4.2
2018–19	Sacred Heart	32	29.1	.518	.358	.759	8.1	0.9	0.6	0.5	14.3
2019–20	Sacred Heart	33	33.2	.484	.250	.728	11.6	1.7	0.9	0.3	15.7
2020–21	Tennessee	22	8.5	.342	.000	.600	1.9	0.3	0.4	0.0	1.7
2021–22	Cal State Fullerton	32	32.7	.516	.267	.777	8.3	1.8	0.8	0.3	16.3
Career	149	24.6	.489	.280	.743	7.2	1.1	0.6	0.3	11.1	

== Professional career ==
=== Chorale Roanne Basket (2023) ===
On August 24, 2023, Anosike signed a deal with the French club, Chorale Roanne Basket, to replace Maxime Roos as he was dealing with an injury. In his first game with Chorale, he only scored 4 points in a losing effort against Cholet basket.

=== Hefei Crazy Storm (2024) ===
At the culmination of the 2024 NBL-China season, Anosike was recognized as the league's scoring leader after averaging 29.9 points per game in 26 games played for the Hefei Crazy Storm.

=== San Miguel Beermen (2024) ===
Anosike signed with the San Miguel Beermen as a replacement player for their injured import, Jordan Adams, just in time for the start of the playoff round of the 2024 Governors' Cup. In his first game with the Beermen, Anosike recorded 28 points, 11 rebounds and 5 assists in a 102–95 victory over Converge. He scored 41 points to propel the Beermen to a 2–0 series lead over the Converge FiberXers.

=== BC Oostende (2024–2025) ===
On December 6, 2024, Anosike signed with BC Oostende of the BNXT League. On March 3, 2025, the team released him after his 3 month interim contract to replace injured players.

=== Petro de Luanda (2025) ===
On April 13, 2025, he joined the Angolan champions Petro de Luanda, signing a contract for the remainder of the season.

== National team career ==
In 2024, Anosike was called up by his home country, Nigeria, for the 2024 FIBA Olympic Qualifying Tournament, but eventually, they failed to accomplish their goal as they bowed out early in the tournament. He averaged six points per game and two rebounds per game in the tournament.

== Personal life ==
Anosike obtained an MBA degree from Cal State Fullerton, and he also graduated with a master's degree in agricultural economics from the University of Tennessee, Knoxville.
