= Johor Southern Tigers =

- Nickname: Southern Tigers
- League: Major Basketball League Malaysia
- Founded: 2022; 4 years ago
- Arena: Larkin Arena
- Capacity: 7,000
- Location: Johor Bahru, Johor
- Team colors: Navy blue, Red, White
- President: Dato' Cuah Boon Hai
- Head coach: Yong Kian Ann
- Team captain: John Wong Khai Chiek
- Ownership: Johor Basketball Association
- Championships: 1x Major Basketball League (2024–25)
- Website: johorsoutherntigersbc.my
Home	Away

The Johor Southern Tigers Basketball Club are a Malaysian basketball team which competes in the Major Basketball League (MBL).

== History ==
The Johor Southern Tigers was established in 2022 and entered the Major Basketball League (MBL). They finished runners-up to the NS Matrix Deers in their first two seasons in 2022 and 2023–24.

Johor won their first MBL title in the 2024–25 season winning over the Penang Sunrise Youngsters in the final. They also qualified for the 2026 Basketball Champions League Asia – East (BCL–East) tournament. The team failed to advance to the semifinals of the 2026 BCL–East.

== Honours ==
- Major Basketball League
  - Winners (1): 2024–25
- MBL U23 D-League
  - Winners (1): 2026
