= Major Basketball League Malaysia =

Professional basketball league in Malaysia

- Sport: Basketball
- Founded: 2017
- Organising body: Malaysia Basketball Association
- No. of teams: 5
- Country: Malaysia
- Confederation: FIBA Asia
- Continent: Asia
- Most recent champion: Johor Southern Tigers (1st title) (2024–25)
- Most titles: NS Matrix Deers (2 titles)
- Broadcaster: MBL (YouTube)
- Level on pyramid: 1
- International cup: Basketball Champions League Asia
- Related competitions: MBL D-League

The Major Basketball League (MBL) Malaysia, formerly the Malaysia Pro League (MPL), is the premier professional basketball league in Malaysia founded by the Malaysia Basketball Association (MABA).

The league also has a farm league which is the MBL Development League. The most notable club in the league is NS Matrix Deers, who also play in the ASEAN Basketball League. The champions of the league are eligible to play for the Basketball Champions League Asia qualifying rounds.

== History ==
In 2013, Malaysia National Basketball League ceased to operate. After four years of absence, MABA created a national level league called Malaysia Pro League.

In 2022, Malaysia Basketball Association announced the establishment of a new professional basketball league called Major Basketball League Malaysia, replacing Malaysia Pro League.

== Teams ==
Currently Team

- Johor Southern Tigers
- NS Matrix
- Penang Sunrise Youngsters
- Kuala Lumpur Titans
- Selangor Hornbills

Defunct/inactive teams

- Sarawak Cola Warriors
- Putrajaya Parkcity Heat
- Kuala Lumpur Aseel
- Farmco TouchUp
- Penang Stallions
- PRG Eagles
- Red Baron
- Verve Club
- Westports Malaysia Dragons
- JD Unicorns (Singapore)
- Kings Pinas Asia (Philippines)
- Z-Braves (Philippines)

=== MPL women ===
- Hatchers Valkyrie
- KL Binapuri
- NS Matrix
- Red Baron
- Segamat BC
- Westports Malaysia Dragons

== Results ==
Men

Year	MPL / MBL		MPL / MBL D-League		MPL / MBL U23 D-League		MPL / MBL U20 D-League		Agong Cup	
Year	Champions	Runners-up	Champions	Runners-up	Champions	Runners-up	Champions	Runners-up	Champions	Runners-up
2026–27					Johor Southern Tigers (2026)	NS Matrix Deers (2026)	NS Matrix Deers (2026)	Selangor BA (2026)		
2024–25	Johor Southern Tigers	Penang Sunrise Youngsters			MBC Rising Star (2025)	Johor Southern Tigers (2025)	MBC Kirin (2025)	NS Matrix Deers (2025)		
2023–24	NS Matrix Deers	Johor Southern Tigers			MBC Kirin (2024)	Sunrise Youngsters (2024)	MBC Kirin (2024)	Johor Southern Tigers (2024)	Negri Sembilan	Johor Southern Tigers
					MBC Rising Star (2023)	Johor Southern Tigers (2023)	Johor Southern Tigers (2023)	Rising Star (2023)		
2022	NS Matrix Deers	Johor Southern Tigers							Negri Sembilan	Malacca
2020–21	Not held									
2019	Farmco Touch Up	NS Matrix Concepts Holdings Berhad	Red Baron Youth	KL Dragons					Negri Sembilan	Westports Malaysia Dragons
2018	—	—	PRG Warriors	KL Dragons					Negri Sembilan	Police
2017	Farmco Touch Up	KL Dragons Basketball Academy							—	—

Women

Year	MPL / MBL Women		MPL / MBL Women D-League		MPL / MBL U23 D-League		MPL / MBL U20 D-League		Agong Cup	
Year	Champions	Runners-up	Champions	Runners-up	Champions	Runners-up	Champions	Runners-up	Champions	Runners-up
2026							EST Jersey (2026)	MABA U18 Selection Team (2026)		
2024–25	Selangor	Johor Tigers			NS Matrix Deers (2025)	JST x MKYC (2025)	EST Jersey (2025)	NS Matrix Deers (2025)	Johor Tigers	NS Matrix
2023–24	NS Matrix	Southern Segamat Tiaras			Selangor EST Jersey (2024)	Johor Southern Tigers (2024)	Selangor EST Jersey (2024)	National U18 Selection Team (2024)	Johor Tigers	NS Matrix
2023					EST Rising Star	Johor Southern Tigers W	NS Matrix/NS Matrix W	EST Jersey x Rising Star	NS Matrix	Johor Tigers
2019	NS Matrix	Hatchers Valkryies							Negri Sembilan	Segamat BA
2018	–	–							Negri Sembilan	Hatchers Sports Club

== See also ==
- ASEAN Basketball League
- AsiaBasket
- East Asia Super League
- Malaysia men's national basketball team
- Malaysia national under-19 basketball team
- Malaysia national under-17 basketball team
- Malaysia women's national basketball team
- Malaysia women's national under-19 basketball team
- Malaysia women's national under-17 basketball team
