= South China AA (basketball) =

- Leagues: HK A1 Division
- Founded: 1932
- History: South China AA (1932–present)
- Location: Hong Kong
- Ownership: South China Athletic Association
- Championships: 17 Hong Kong A1 Division; 13 Silver shields 2 Strait cups 1 Hong Kong A2 Division
Home	Away

The South China Athletic Association Men's Basketball Team (Chinese: 南華（男子）籃球隊; SCAA Basketball Team), commonly known as South China, is a professional basketball team of the South China Athletic Association, playing in the A1 Division of the Hong Kong Basketball League.

== Honours ==
- Hong Kong Basketball A1 Division

Winners (17): 1954-55, 1957-58, 1959-60, 1984, 1985, 1986, 2004, 2005, 2008, 2012, 2013, 2016, 2017, 2021, 2022, 2025

- Hong Kong Senior Silver Shield

Winners (13): 1958-1960, 1985, 1987, 2004, 2005, 2008, 2009, 2010, 2012, 2013, 2015

- Straits Cup

Winners (2): 2008, 2010

- Hong Kong Basketball A2 Division

Winners (1): 2002

- Basketball Champions League Asia – East

Winners (1): 2026

== Notable players ==
- Set a club record or won an individual award as a professional player.
- Played at least one official international match for his senior national team at any time.

- (Hong Kong) Duncan Reid
- (Hong Kong) Lin Ho Chun
- (Hong Kong) Lo Yi Ting
- (Hong Kong) Shiu Wah Leung
- (Australia) Trevor Watts
