= Hong Kong A1 Division Championship =

Top division of men's basketball league in Hong Kong

Hong Kong A1 Division Championship (HKA1)
- Sport: Basketball
- Founded: 1954
- First season: 1954–55
- Owner: Hong Kong Basketball Association
- No. of teams: 10
- Countries: Hong Kong
- Continent: FIBA Asia (Asia)
- Most recent champion: Eastern (4th title) (2025–26)
- Most titles: South China (17 titles)
- International cup: Basketball Champions League Asia
- Website: HKBA

Hong Kong A1 Division Championship (Chinese: 香港男子甲一組籃球聯賽), abbreviated as HKA1 and A1 Division, is the top division of men's basketball league in Hong Kong. The league was founded in 1954 and the inaugural season was held the same year. Currently, ten teams make up the league.

South China is the most successful team in league history with 17 titles.

== Format ==
Since 2021, the season is usually held between September and April, with offseason taking place from May to August. To make the league more entertaining, a play-off system was adopted in 2005 and an all-star game was held in the middle of the season.

== Current clubs ==
A total of ten teams contested in the 2024 season:

- Chun Lung (晉龍WTS)
- Chun Yu Basketball Club (晉裕)
- Eagles (飛鷹)
- Eastern (東方)
- Fukien (福建)
- South China (南華)
- Winling (永倫)
- Yuk Fai (滿貫)
- ABLE Hon Friends (安保漢友)
- Pegasus Kinlung (建龍飛馬)

== Champions ==
| Edition | Year(s) | Champion |
|---|---|---|
| 1 | 1954–55 | South China (1) |
| 2 | 1955–56 | Self-Strength (1) |
| 3 | 1956–57 | Eastern (1) |
| 4 | 1957–58 | South China (2) |
| 5 | 1958–59 | Pei Er (1) |
| 6 | 1959–60 | South China (3) |
| 7 | 1977 | Kung Ngam (1) |
| 8 | 1978 | Police (1) |
| 9 | 1979 | Police (2) |
| 10 | 1980 | Kung Ngam (2) |
| 11 | 1981 | Kung Ngam (3) |
| 12 | 1982 | Kung Ngam (4) |
| 13 | 1983 | Si Yuan (1) |
| 14 | 1984 | South China (4) |
| 15 | 1985 | South China (5) |
| 16 | 1986 | South China (6) |
| 17 | 1987 | Police (3) |
| 18 | 1988 | Fukien (1) |
| 19 | 1989 | Si Yuan (2) |
| 20 | 1990 | Si Yuan (3) |
| 21 | 1991 | Fukien (2) |
| 22 | 1992 | Winling (1) |
| 23 | 1993 | Si Yuan (4) |
| 24 | 1994 | Winling (2) |
| 25 | 1995 | Winling (3) |
| 26 | 1996 | Winling (4) |
| 27 | 1997 | Winling (5) |
| 28 | 1998 | Winling (6) |
| 29 | 1999 | Winling (7) |
| 30 | 2000 | Winling (8) |
| 31 | 2001 | Winling (9) |
| 32 | 2002 | Winling (10) |
| 33 | 2003 | Fukien (3) |
| 34 | 2004 | South China (7) |
| 35 | 2005 | South China (8) |
| 36 | 2006 | Winling (11) |
| 37 | 2007 | Winling (12) |
| 38 | 2008 | South China (9) |
| 39 | 2009 | Winling (13) |
| 40 | 2010 | Winling (14) |
| 41 | 2010–11 | Winling (15) |
| 42 | 2011–12 | South China (10) |
| 43 | 2012–13 | South China (11) |
| 44 | 2013–14 | Winling (16) |
| 45 | 2014–15 | Winling (17) |
| 46 | 2015–16 | South China (12) |
| 47 | 2016–17 | South China (13) |
| 48 | 2017–18 | Eastern (2) |
| 49 | 2018–19 | South China (14) |
| – | 2019–20 | No competition |
| 50 | 2020–21 | South China (15) |
| 51 | 2021–22 | South China (16) |
| – | 2022–23 | No competition |
| 52 | 2023–24 | Eastern (3) |
| 53 | 2024–25 | South China (17) |
| 54 | 2025–26 | Eastern (4) |
