= Matt Jones (basketball) =

American basketball player (born 1994)

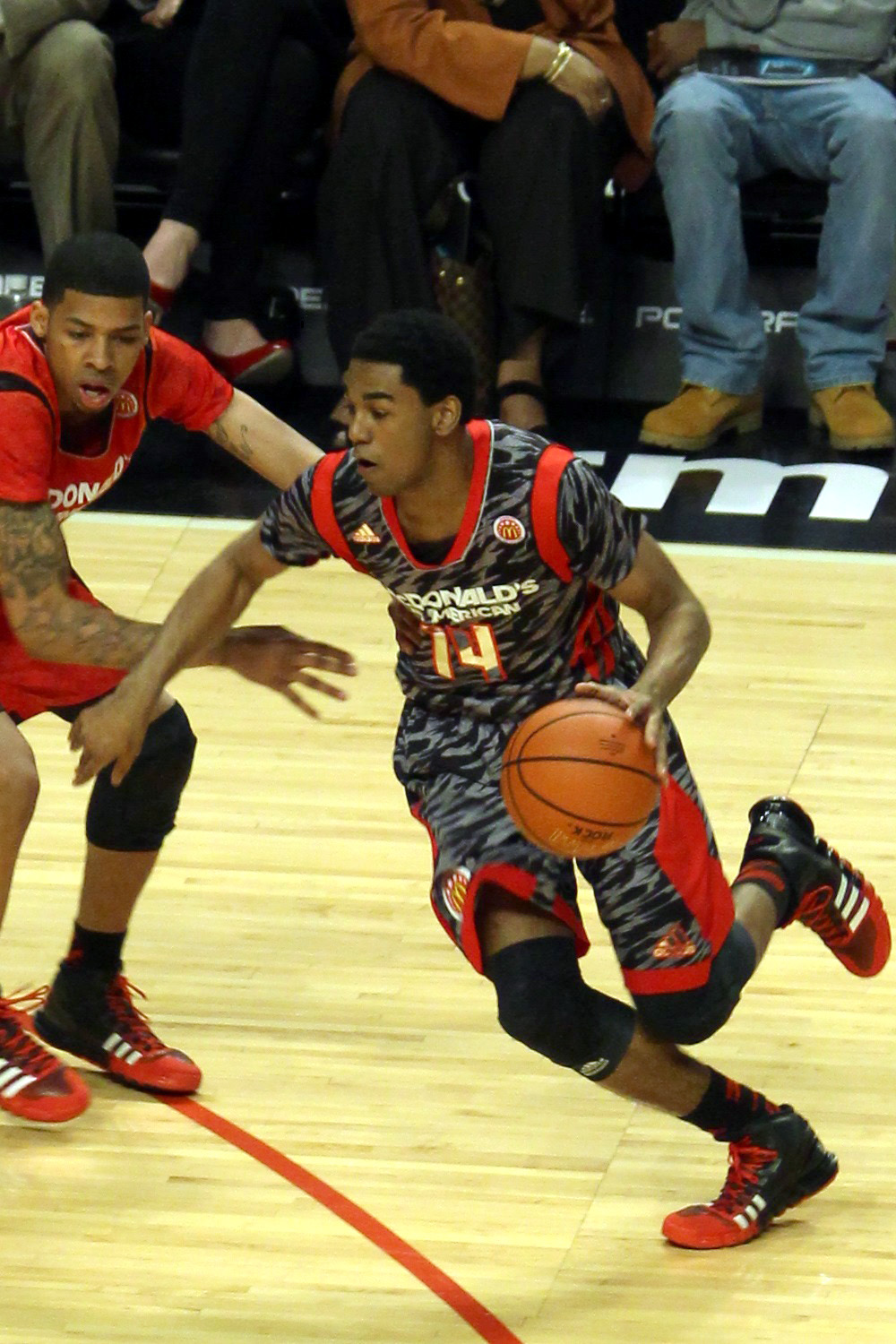
- Jones at the 2013 McDonald's All-American Game

Personal information
- Born: December 5, 1994 (age 30) Dallas, Texas, U.S.
- Listed height: 6 ft 5 in (1.96 m)
- Listed weight: 204 lb (93 kg)

Career information
- High school: DeSoto (DeSoto, Texas)
- College: Duke (2013–2017)
- NBA draft: 2017: undrafted
- Playing career: 2017–2020
- Position: Shooting guard

Career history
- 2017–2019: Reno Bighorns / Stockton Kings
- 2019–2020: Bank of Taiwan

Career highlights
- NCAA champion (2015); ACC All-Defensive Team (2017); McDonald's All-American (2013)
- Stats at Basketball Reference

Matthew Elliot Jones (born December 5, 1994) is an American former professional basketball player. He played four seasons of college basketball for the Duke Blue Devils.

== High school career ==
During Jones's career at DeSoto High School, the team had a 131–18 record, and he was named All-State, 2nd team All-American from MaxPreps, and played in both the Jordan Classic and the McDonald's All-American Game. On November 28, 2011, Jones committed to Duke University.

== College career ==
=== Sophomore season (2014-2015) ===
Jones was on Duke's 2014–15 NCAA Championship team. After Rasheed Sulaimon was dismissed, Jones was moved into the starting lineup. “I’ve definitely tried to grasp it and take ahold of it,” Jones said.. “Obviously we didn’t want Rasheed to leave, but at the same time, personally, I was ecstatic about it. I just told myself that it was my moment now, and I had to just take advantage of it.”

In the Elite Eight, he scored 16 points, going 4-for-7 on three-pointers in a win against Gonzaga. As a result, he was named to the South Region all-tournament team. The all-regional performance came at NRG Stadium in Houston, just over 3 hours away from Jones' home in DeSoto, Texas.

=== Junior season (2015-2016) ===
After winning the National championship in his sophomore season, Jones returned to Duke, where as a junior he averaged 10.4 points, 2.4 rebounds and 1.0 steals per game.

== Professional career ==
After going undrafted, Jones joined the Reno Bighorns of the NBA G League. He remained on the team as it became the Stockton Kings.

== Personal life ==
He has two sisters and a brother, Mason, who was a player at the University of Arkansas, and now as a professional. One sister, Jordan, also played in the McDonald's high school basketball game—they are the 3rd brother/sister duo to play in that all star game.
