= Kasey Hill =

American basketball player

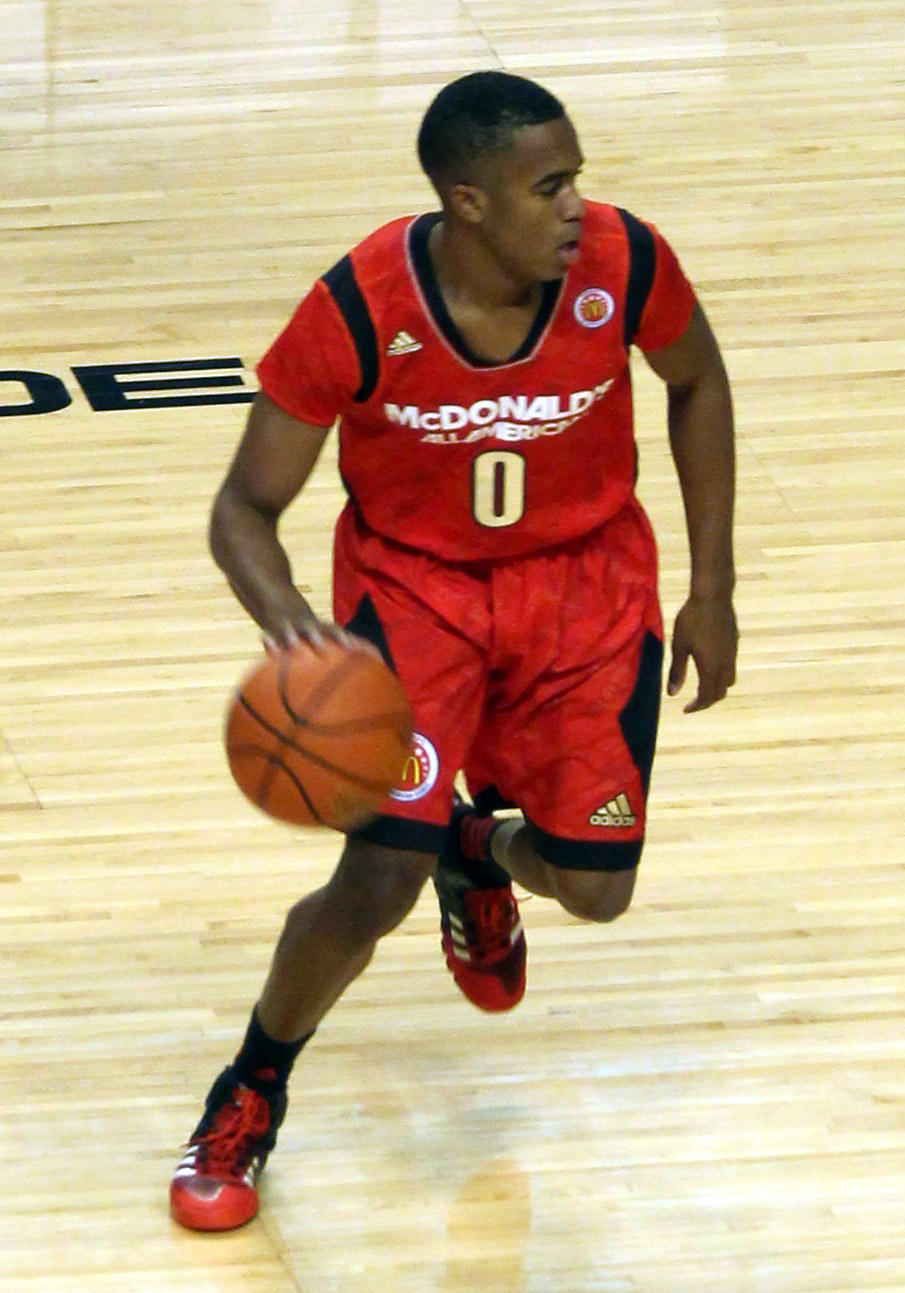
- Hill in the 2013 McDonald's All-American Boys Game

Free Agent
- Position: Point guard

Personal information
- Born: December 3, 1993 (age 32) Umatilla, Florida, U.S.
- Listed height: 6 ft 1 in (1.85 m)
- Listed weight: 175 lb (79 kg)

Career information
- High school: Montverde Academy (Montverde, Florida)
- College: Florida (2013–2017)
- NBA draft: 2017: undrafted
- Playing career: 2017–present

Career history
- 2017–2018: Alba Fehérvár
- 2018–2019: APOEL
- 2019–2020: Eisbären Bremerhaven
- 2020: Wilki Morskie Szczecin
- 2020–2021: Science City Jena
- 2021: Pärnu
- 2021–2022: Antalya Güneşi
- 2024: Shenzhen Leopards

Career highlights
- Second-team All-SEC (2017); SEC All-Defensive Team (2017); McDonald's All-American (2013)

Kasey Jamal Hill (born December 3, 1993) is an American professional basketball player who last played for Shenzhen Leopards of the Chinese Basketball Association (CBA). He played college basketball for the Florida Gators.

== Early life ==
Hill was raised by Jeff and Jennie Simmons after his father was sent to prison. He befriended their son, Kyle, in grade school. Hill was named a McDonald's All-American as a senior in high school. He played high school basketball at Montverde Academy alongside future Florida teammate Michael Frazier II.

== College career ==
In Hill's freshman season, Florida reached the Final Four. He was a backup point guard to Scottie Wilbekin. During his time at UF, Hill made 57.7% of his free throws. In the 2016–17 season under Florida coach Mike White, Hill averaged 9.7 points, 2.9 rebounds, 1.7 steals, and 0.1 blocks per game, earning him a spot on the SEC All-Defensive Team. Hill's 2016–17 season was littered with standout performances such as the 22-point defeat of Kentucky on February 4 when he achieved 21 points, 5 rebounds, and 4 assists in front of a sold-out crowd at the newly renovated O'Connell Center.

== Professional career ==
Following the close of his college career, Hill signed with Alba Fehérvár of the Hungarian League on July 21, 2017.

On August 12, 2019, Hill signed with Eisbären Bremerhaven of the German ProA. On August 3, 2020, Hill signed with Wilki Morskie Szczecin of the Polish Basketball League. In six games he averaged 6.0 points, 1.7 rebounds and 3.3 assists per game. Hill parted ways with the team on October 8.

On December 7, 2020, he has signed with Science City Jena of the German ProA.
