= Chris Walker (basketball, born 1994) =

American basketball player (born 1994)

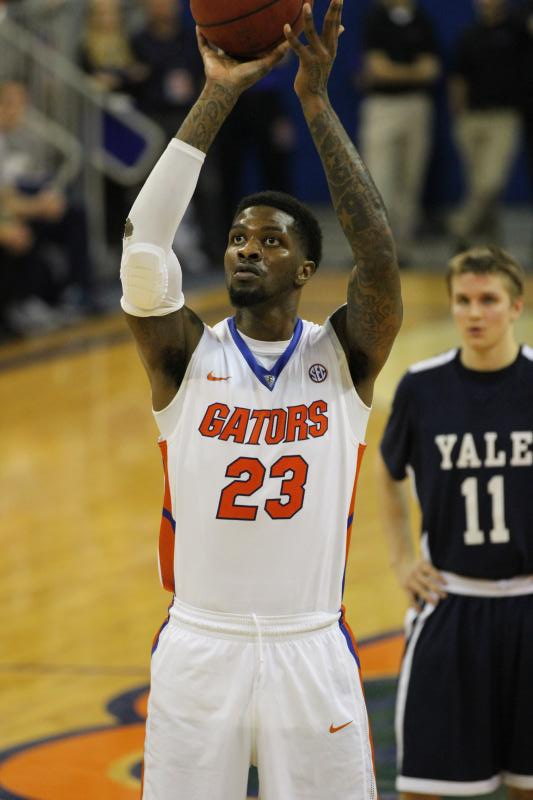
- Walker with Florida in 2014

Free agent
- Position: Power forward

Personal information
- Born: December 22, 1994 (age 31) Bonifay, Florida, U.S.
- Listed height: 6 ft 9 in (2.06 m)
- Listed weight: 200 lb (91 kg)

Career information
- High school: Holmes County (Bonifay, Florida)
- College: Florida (2013–2015)
- NBA draft: 2015: undrafted
- Playing career: 2015–present

Career history
- 2015–2018: Rio Grande Valley Vipers
- 2018: Huellas del Siglo
- 2018: Leones de Ponce
- 2018–2019: Rio Grande Valley Vipers
- 2020–2021: Rilski Sportist Samokov
- 2021–2022: Long Island Nets
- 2022: Iowa Wolves
- 2022: Texas Legends
- 2022: Ontario Clippers
- 2022–2023: Cleveland Charge
- 2023–2025: Osceola Magic

Career highlights
- NBA G League champion (2019); McDonald's All-American (2013); First-team Parade All-American (2013)
- Stats at Basketball Reference

Chris Walker (born December 22, 1994) is an American professional basketball player for the Osceola Magic of the NBA G League. He played college basketball for the Florida Gators.

== High school career ==
Walker attended Holmes County High School, which he led as a senior to a 1A state championship and a 20–8 record, tallying 30 points, 15 rebounds and seven blocks in the title game. He also started in the 2013 Jordan Brand Classic, having 14 points and seven rebounds and earned McDonald's All-American honors.

Walker won the 2013 Powerade Jam fest. Beating Andrew Wiggins, Jabari Parker, and Aaron Gordon en route to the slam dunk contest victory.

== College career ==
Having offers from Florida State, Baylor, Connecticut, Kansas, and Ohio State, Walker chose to play for the University of Florida, but due to his inability to academically qualify, he didn't enroll until December 2013. When he finally joined the Gators, he missed 10 more games while the NCAA investigated allegations that he had received improper benefits in high school, and an additional two when it was determined he had. In two seasons with the Gators, he averaged 3.7 points and 2.7 rebounds in 49 career appearances, including six starts.

== Professional career ==
=== Rio Grande Valley Vipers (2015–2018) ===
After going undrafted in the 2015 NBA draft, Walker joined the Houston Rockets for the Las Vegas Summer League. On September 21, 2015, he signed with the Rockets, only to be waived by the team on October 23 after appearing in three preseason games.

On November 2, Walker was acquired by the Rio Grande Valley Vipers of the NBA Development League as an affiliate player of the Rockets.

=== Huellas del Siglo / Leones de Ponce (2018) ===
In April 2018, Walker signed with Huellas del Siglo of the Dominican Torneo de Baloncesto Superior, making his debut on April 17 in an 81–78 win over San Carlos.

On April 28, Walker signed with Leones de Ponce of the Puerto Rican Baloncesto Superior Nacional.

=== Second Stint with Rio Grande Valley Vipers (2018–2019) ===
Walker rejoined the Rio Grande Valley Vipers for the 2018–19 season.

=== Rilski Sportist Samokov (2020–2021) ===
On January 17, 2020, it was reported that Rilski Sportist Samokov had signed Walker.

=== Long Island Nets (2021–2022) ===
On October 23, 2021, the Long Island Nets selected Walker in 2021 NBA G League draft, Walker was included in the training camp roster of the Long Island Nets announced two days later. Walker was then later waived by the Nets on January 23, 2022.

=== Iowa Wolves (2022) ===
On January 24, 2022, Walker was acquired via available player pool by the Iowa Wolves. On February 11, 2022, Walker was waived by the Iowa Wolves.

=== Texas Legends (2022) ===
On February 26, 2022, Walker was acquired via available player pool by the Texas Legends. On March 16, 2022, Walker was waived.

=== Ontario Clippers (2022) ===
On March 18, 2022, Walker was acquired via available player pool by the Ontario Clippers.

=== Cleveland Charge (2022–2023) ===
On October 24, 2022, Walker joined the Cleveland Charge training camp roster. He was waived on November 1, but re-signed with the Charge on November 5. He was waived again on February 7.

=== Osceola Magic (2023–2025) ===
On November 2, 2023, Walker joined the Osceola Magic.

== Personal life ==
Walker grew up in Bonifay, Florida He was raised by his Great Grandmother and Uncle, along with his two brothers. She died in 2009 when he was 14, and a family friend, Jeneen Campbell, became his guardian.
