= 2013 McDonald's All-American Boys Game =

American high school basketball game

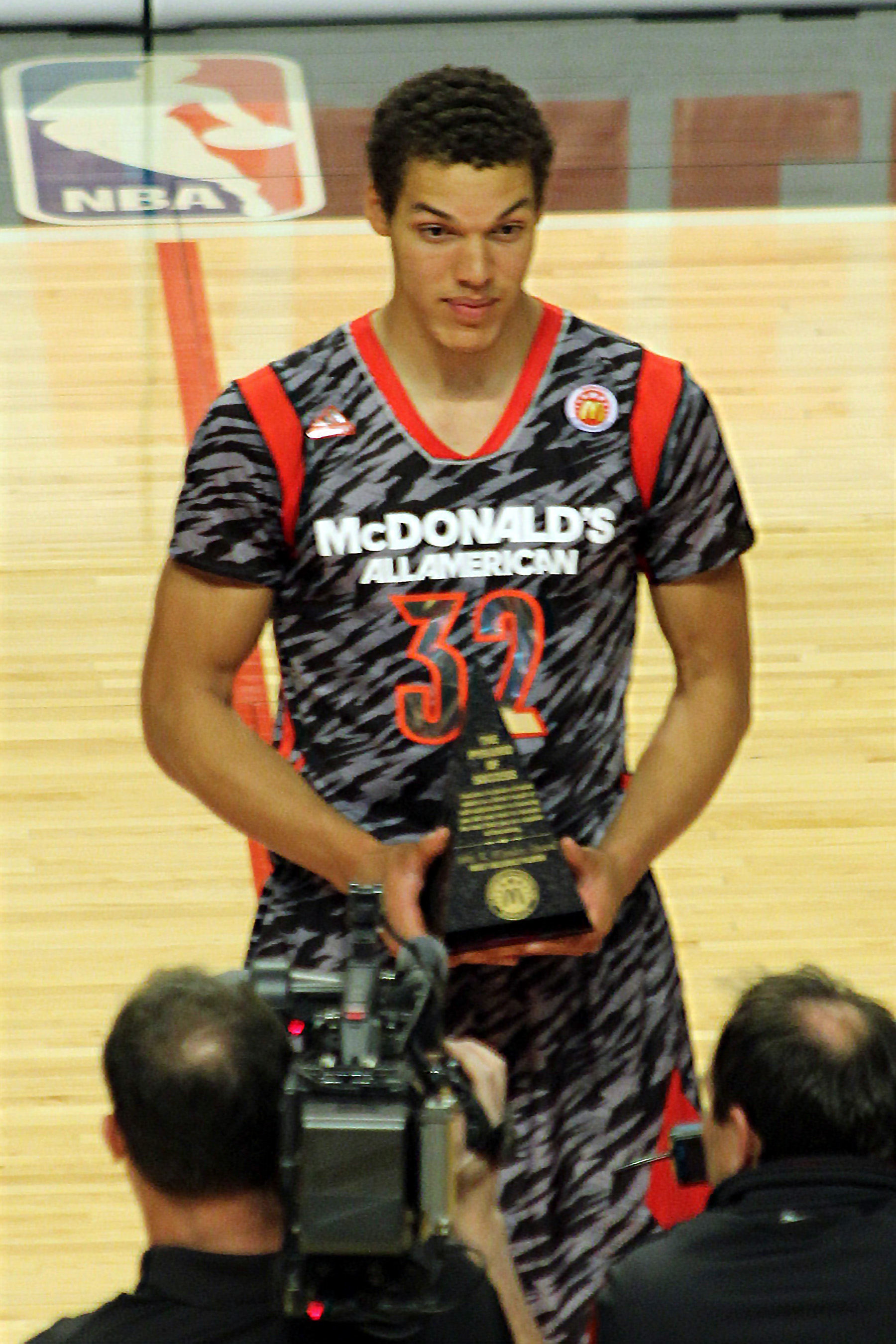
- Aaron Gordon earned MVP honors
East	West
99	110
	1st half	2nd half	Total
East	44	55	99
West	56	54	110
- Date: April 3, 2013 9:30 PM ET
- Venue: United Center, Chicago, Illinois
- MVP: Aaron Gordon
- Referees: Dave King; Bobby Daw; James Ford
- Attendance: 15,818
- Halftime show: Trevor Jackson
- Network: ESPN
- Announcers: Carter Blackburn Jalen Rose & Jay Williams

McDonald's All-American

The 2013 McDonald's All-American Boys Game was an All-star basketball game that was played on April 3, 2013 at the United Center in Chicago, home of the Chicago Bulls. It is the 36th annual McDonald's All-American Game for high school boys. The game's rosters featured the best and most highly recruited blue chip boys high school basketball players graduating in 2013. Chicago, which became the first city to host the game in back-to-back years in 2012, continued to host the game annually until 2017. The Kentucky Wildcats landed a record number of 5 selections at the time of the original selection and an additional later commitment. The West team won the game by a 110–99 margin and Aaron Gordon was MVP.

== Rosters ==
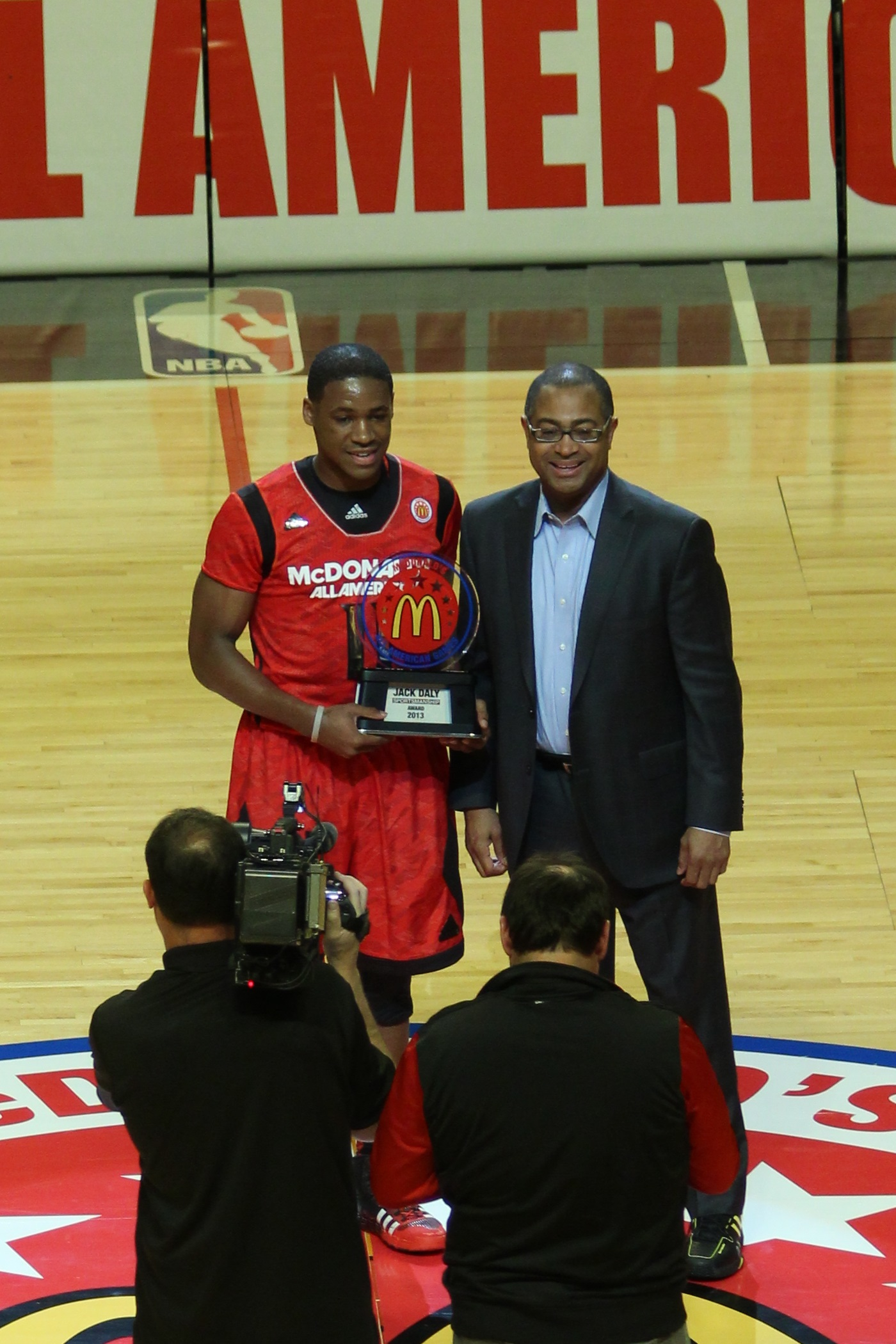
At halftime Demetrius Jackson was recognized with the Jack Daly Sportsmanship Award

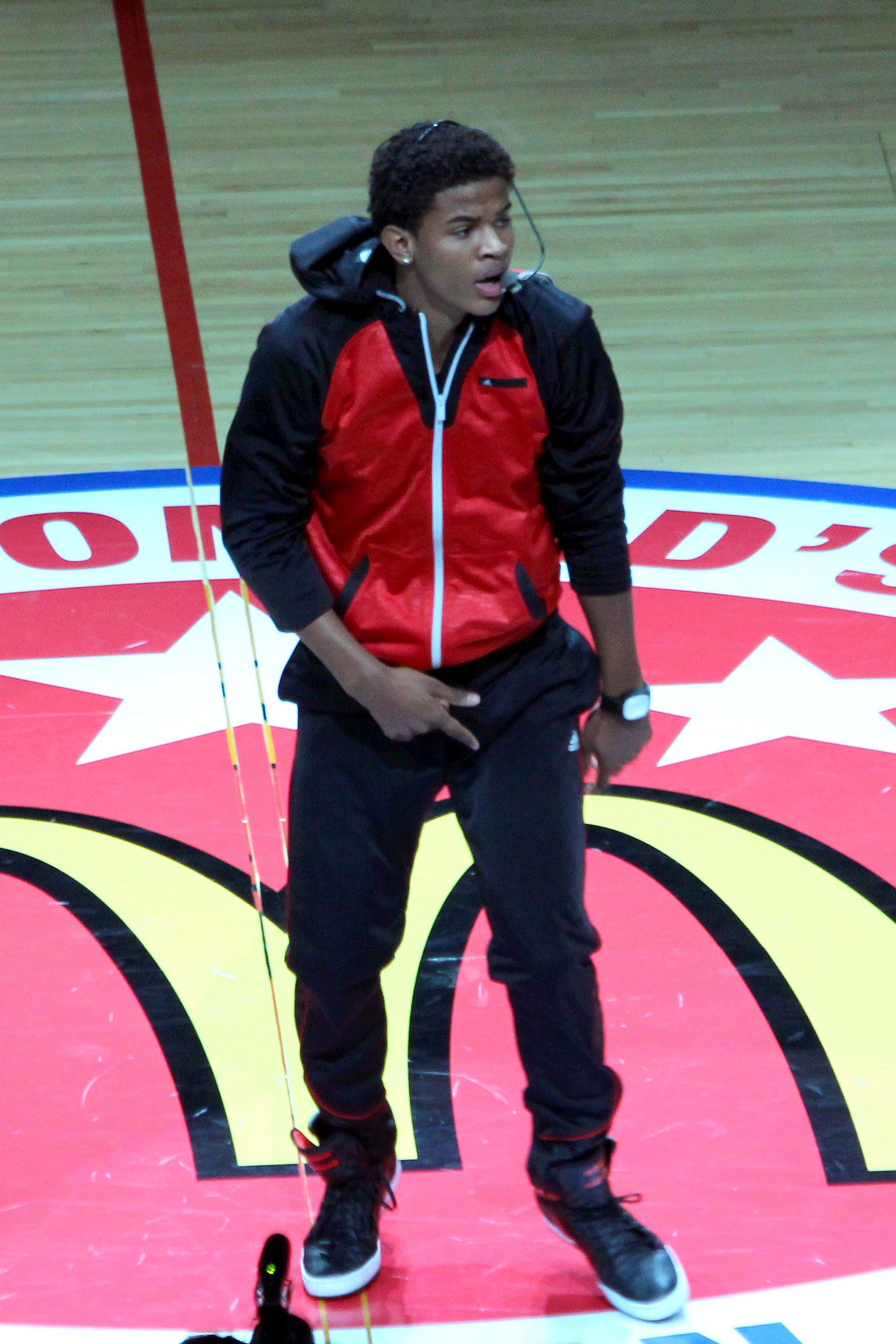
Trevor Jackson, halftime entertainer

Kentucky established a record in 2013 with five selections (Andrew Harrison, Aaron Harrison, James Young, Marcus Lee and Dakari Johnson) to the 24-man roster as well as a late addition, Julius Randle who have committed to one college program, while Duke (Jabari Parker and Matt Jones), North Carolina (Isaiah Hicks and Kennedy Meeks), Florida (Kasey Hill and Chris Walker) each had a pair of selections among their respective recruiting classes. Arizona (Aaron Gordon and Rondae Hollis-Jefferson) also ended up with two commits after Gordon announced at the 2013 McDonald's All-American Boys Game media day. Later, Kansas had two selections as well, but Andrew Wiggins did not sign with Kansas until May 2013 to join Wayne Selden Jr. The previous record of four athletes in a single school's recruiting class had been shared by Michigan (1991, featuring four of the group soon to be known as the Fab Five), Duke (1999) and Kentucky (2011) The state of Texas produced five and the state of California produced four nominees. Parker is a native of the host city. The game includes a pair of twins in the Harrison brothers, which had recently happened in 2009 and 2006. Nine of the top ten recruits, according to ESPN.com's Class of 2013 ESPN 100 listing were selected, but Julius Randle, who missed most of the season with a foot fracture was not selected, originally. On March 6, Randle was added to the roster. He committed to Kentucky on March 20.

=== East Roster ===
#	Name	Height	Weight	Position	Hometown	High school	College choice
12	Cat Barber	6-2	165	G	Hampton, Virginia	Hampton High School	NC State
3	Keith Frazier	6-5	182	G	Dallas, Texas	Justin F. Kimball High School	SMU
4	Isaiah Hicks	6-9	205	F	Oxford, North Carolina	J. F. Webb High School	North Carolina
0	Kasey Hill	6-1	180	G	Eustis, Florida	Montverde Academy	Florida
11	Demetrius Jackson	6-1	185	G	Mishawaka, Indiana	Marian High School	Notre Dame
2	Rondae Hollis-Jefferson	6-6	205	F	Philadelphia, Pennsylvania	Chester High School	Arizona
41	Dakari Johnson	6-11	250	C	New York City, New York	Montverde Academy	Kentucky
5	Kennedy Meeks	6-10	285	C	Charlotte, North Carolina	West Charlotte High School	North Carolina
30	Julius Randle	6-9	225	F	Dallas, Texas	Prestonwood Christian Academy	Kentucky
1	Wayne Selden, Jr.	6-5	225	G	Boston, Massachusetts	Tilton School	Kansas
35	Noah Vonleh	6-9	225	F	Haverhill, Massachusetts	New Hampton School	Indiana
23	Chris Walker	6-10	215	F	Bonifay, Florida	Holmes County High School	Florida
22	Andrew Wiggins	6-8	205	F	Thornhill, Canada	Huntington Prep School	Kansas

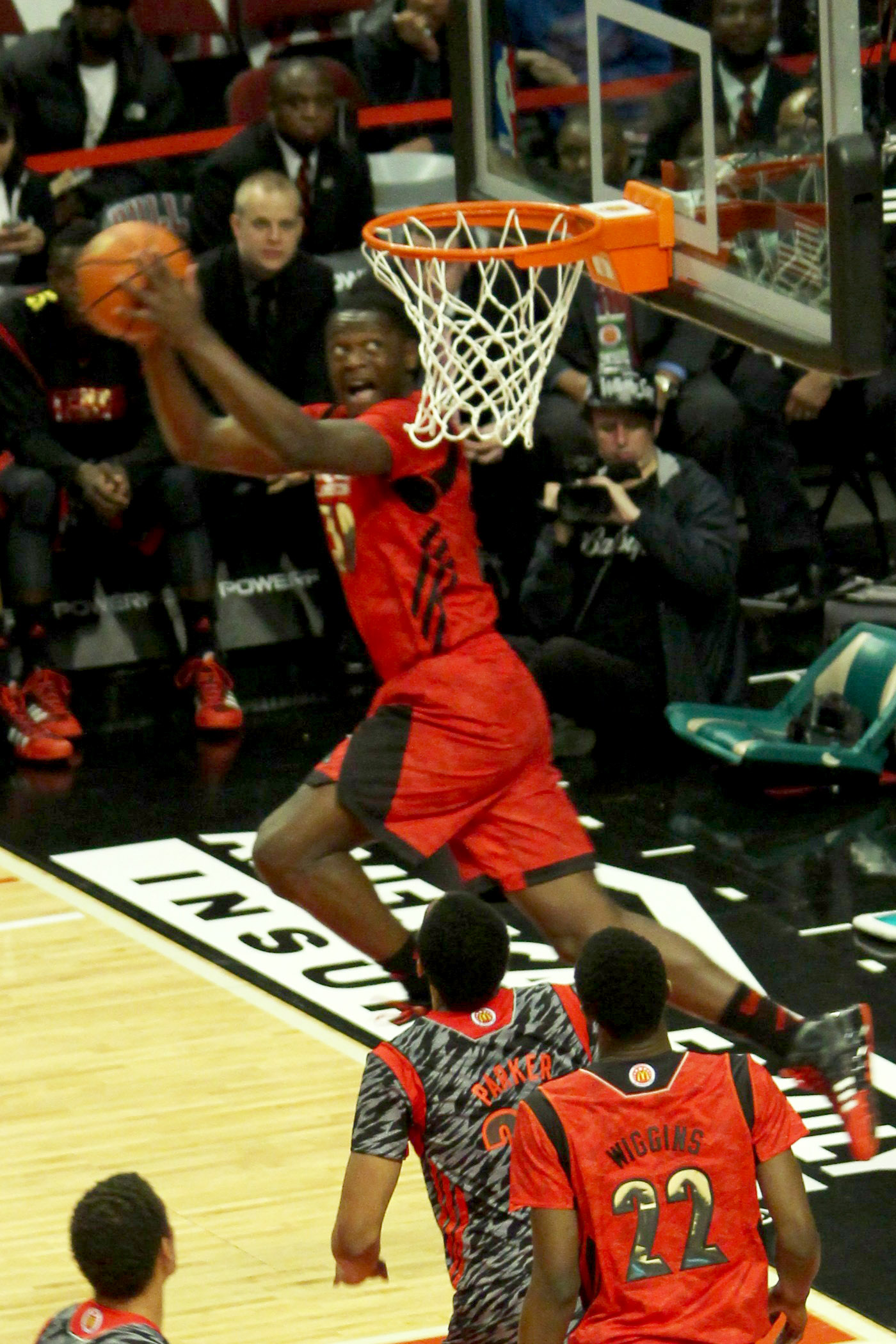
Julius Randle

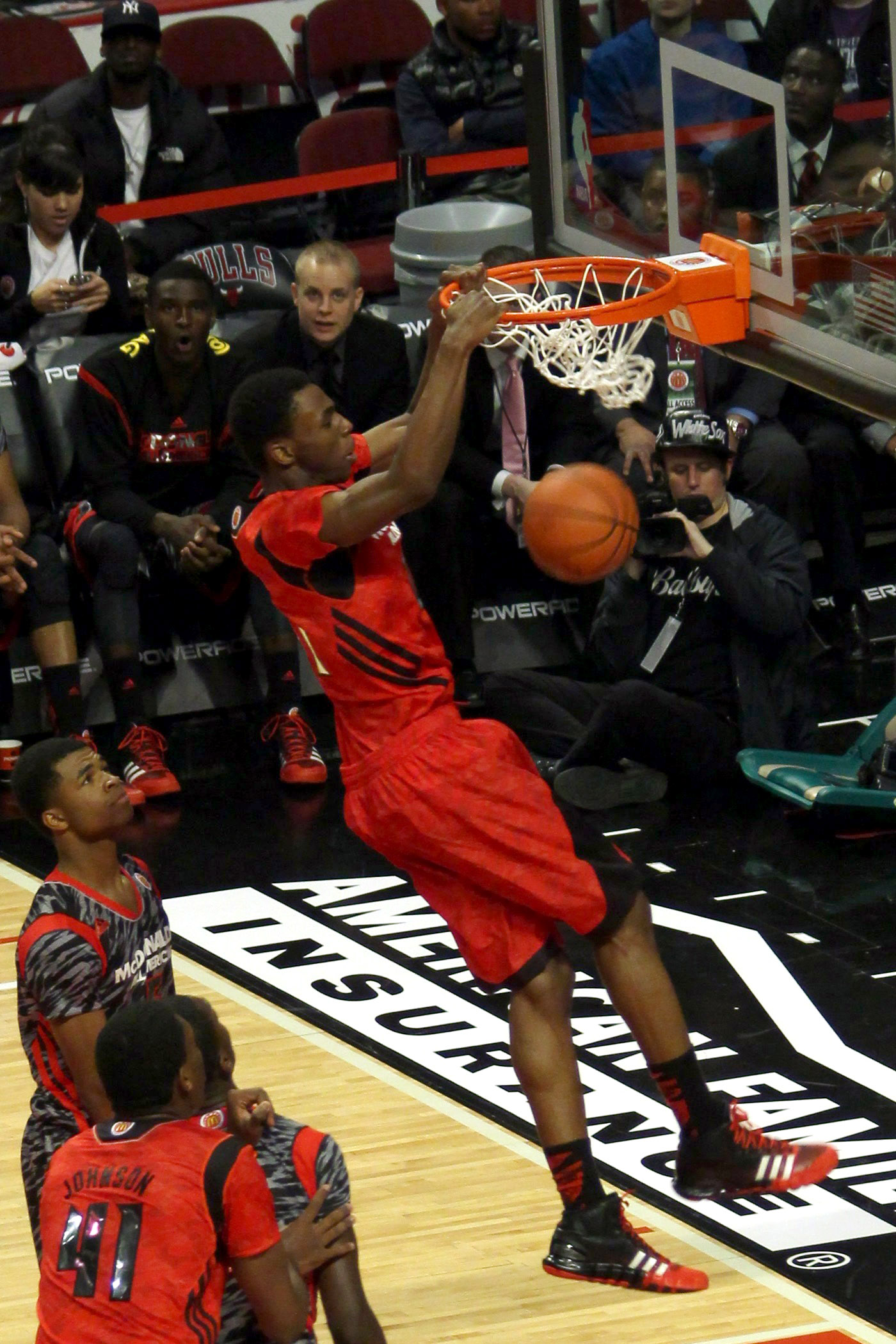
Andrew Wiggins

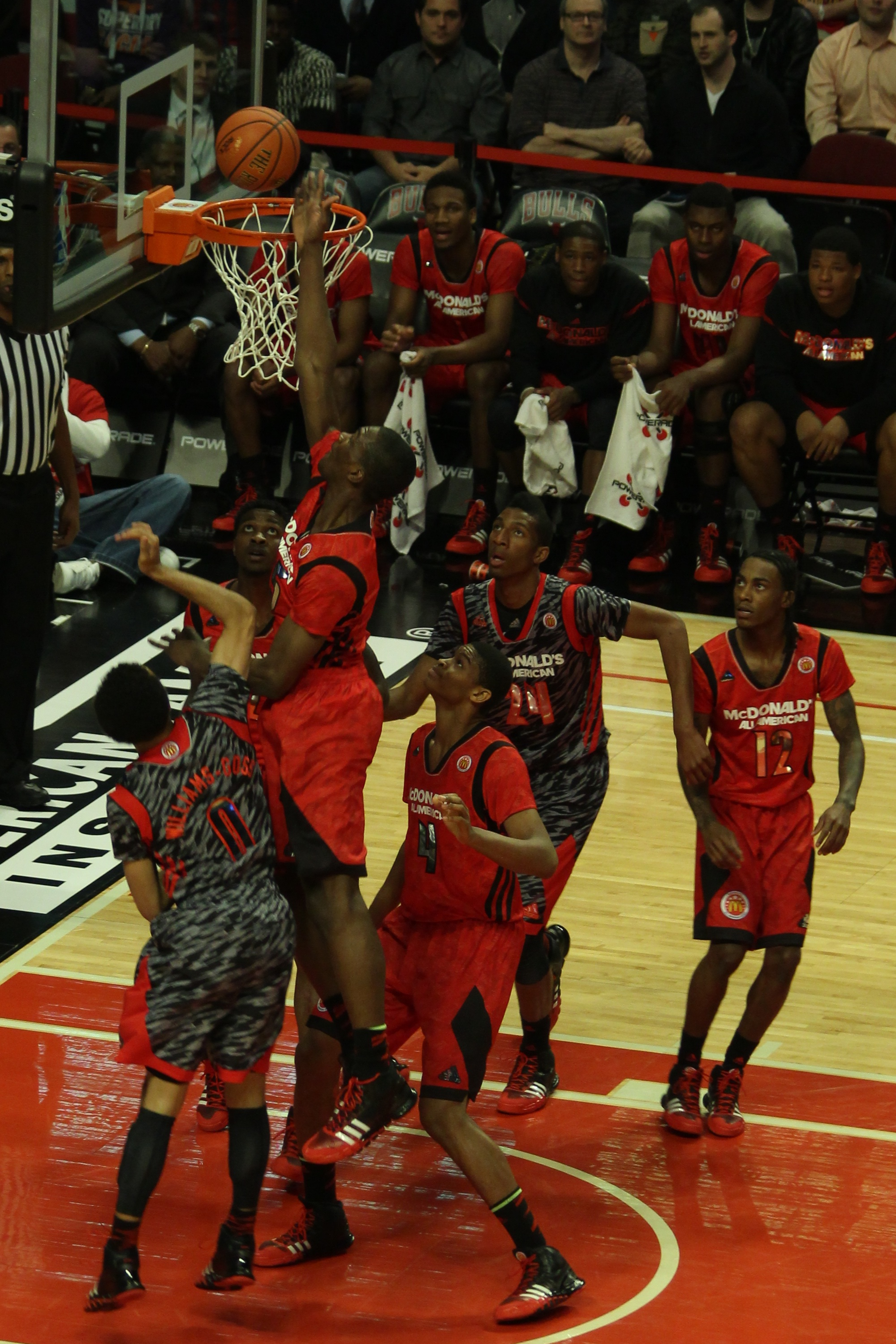
Noah Vonleh

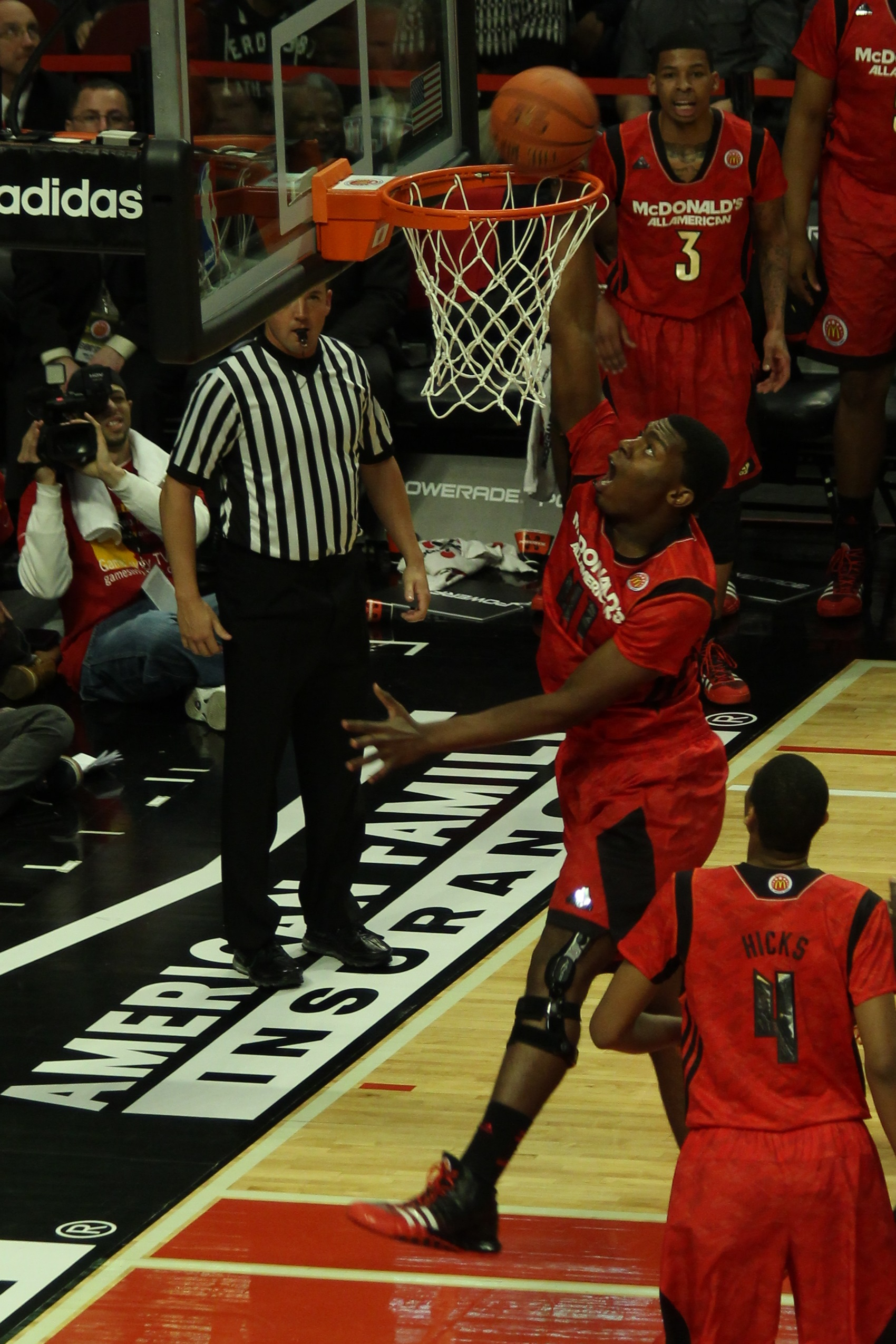
Dakari Johnson

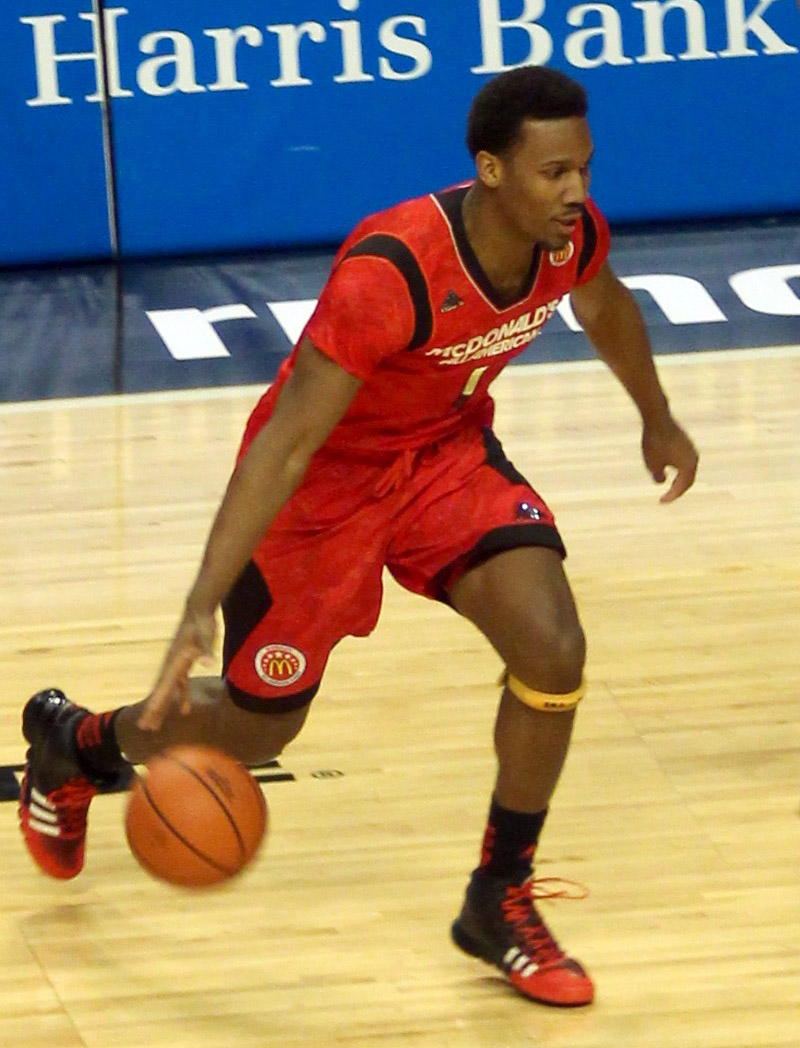
Wayne Selden Jr.

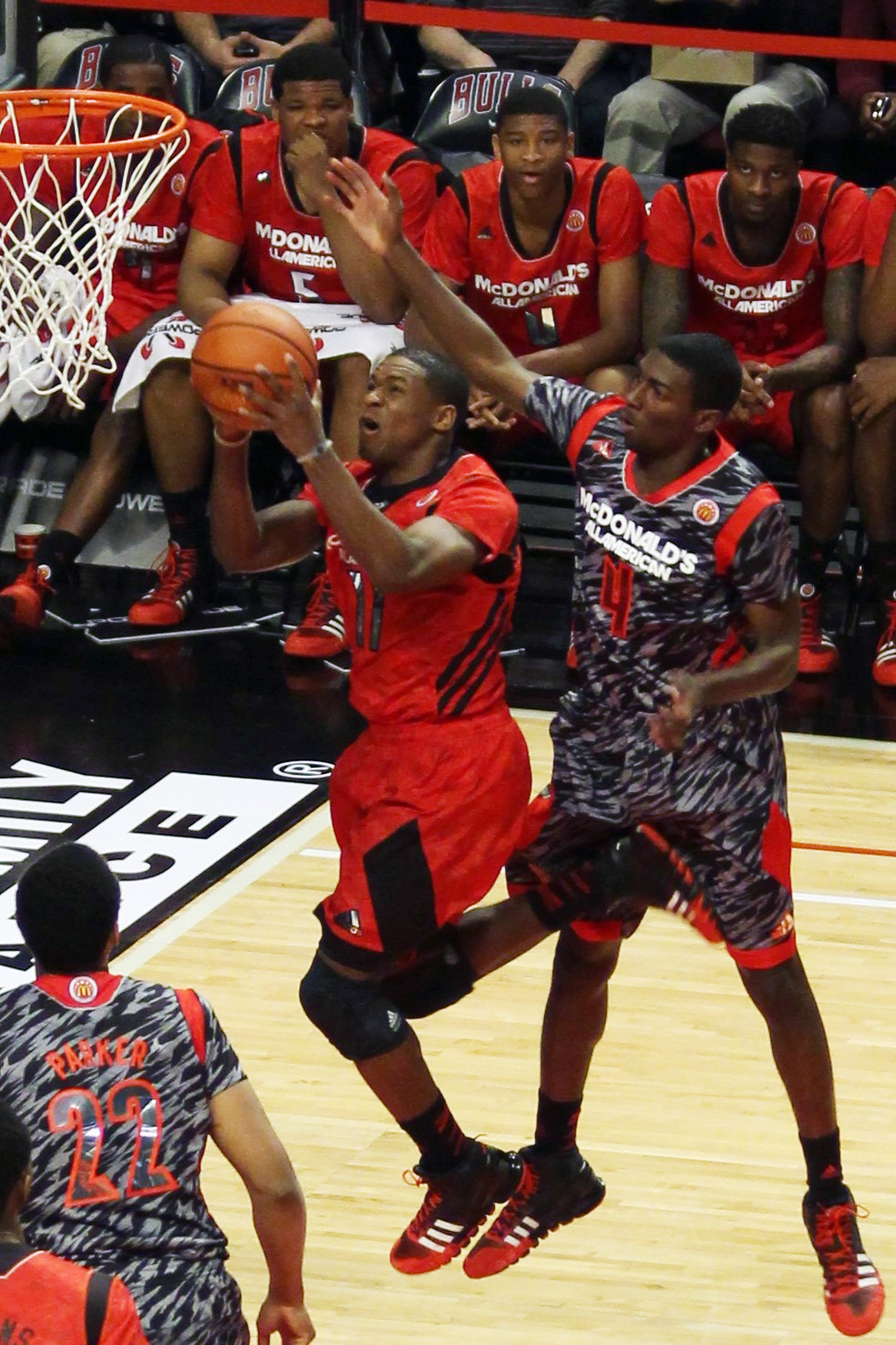
Demetrius Jackson

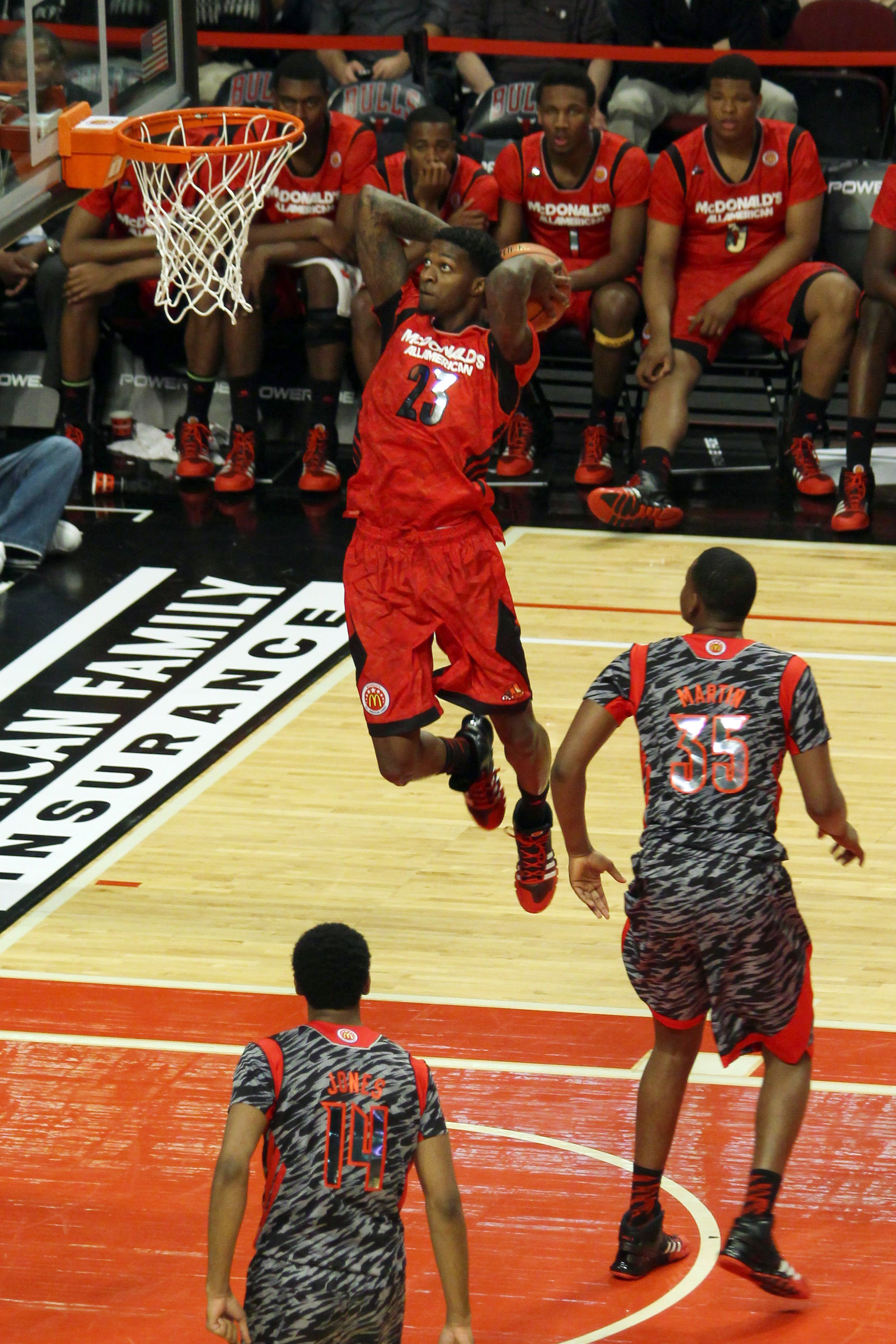
Chris Walker

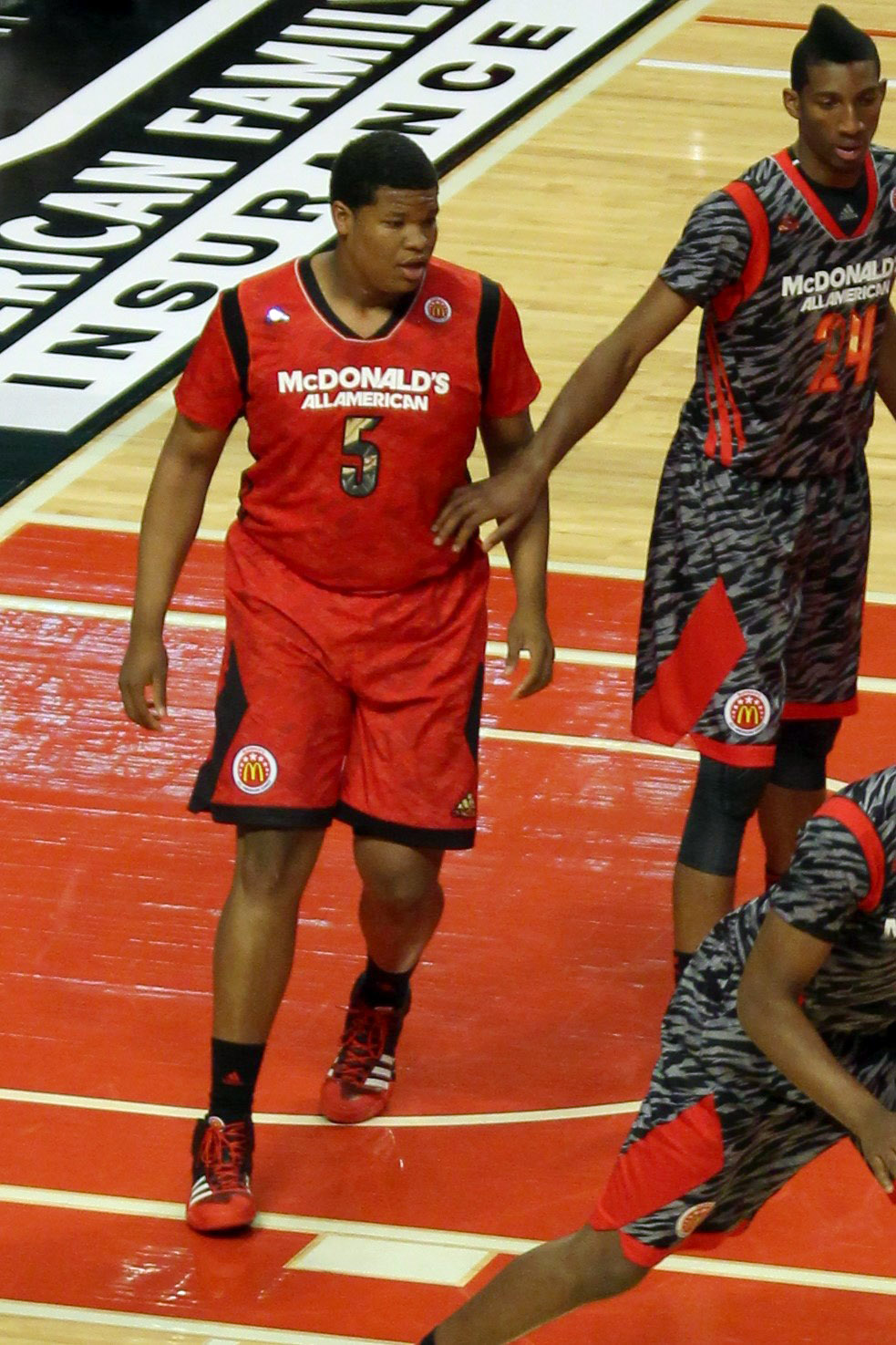
Kennedy Meeks

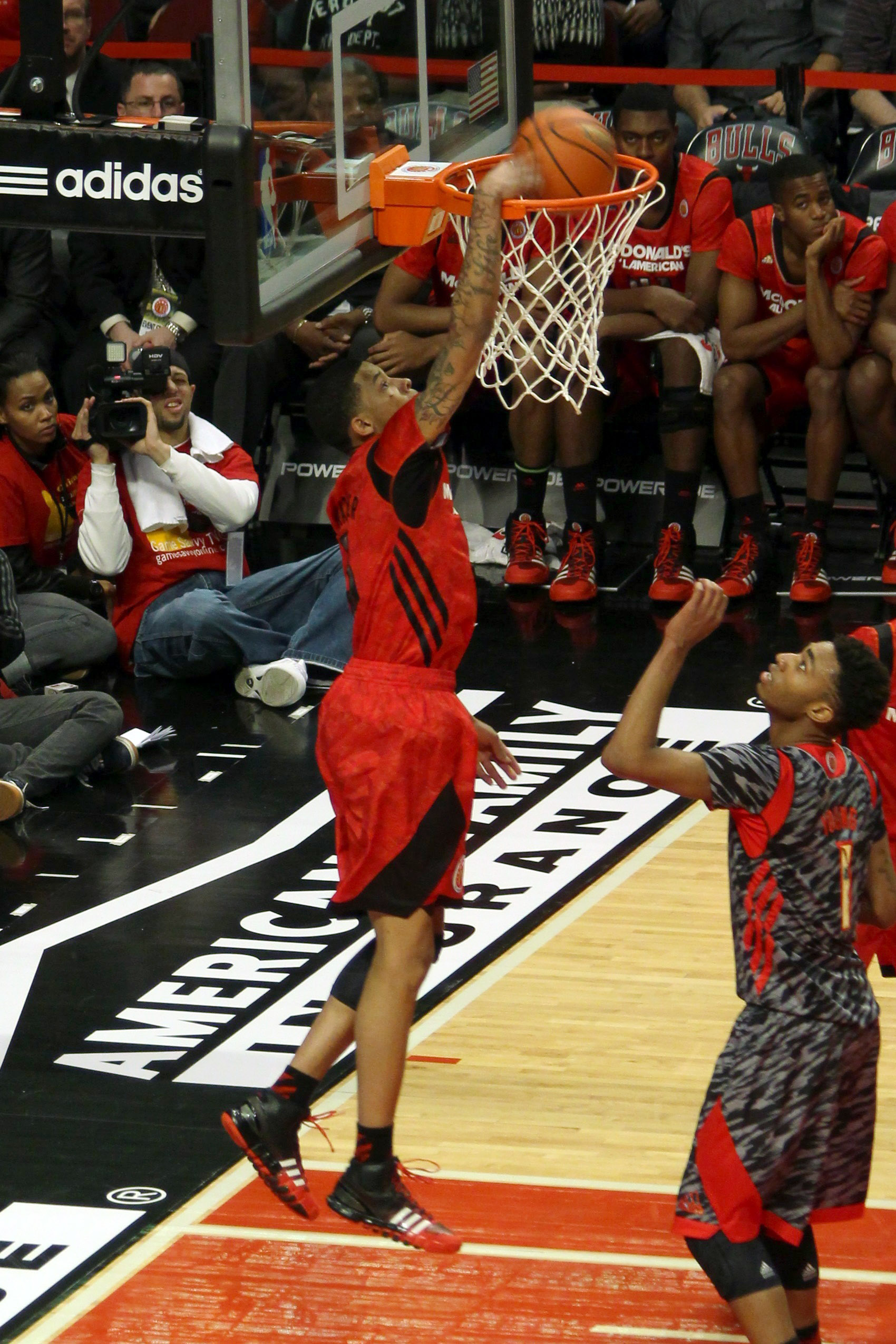
Keith Frazier

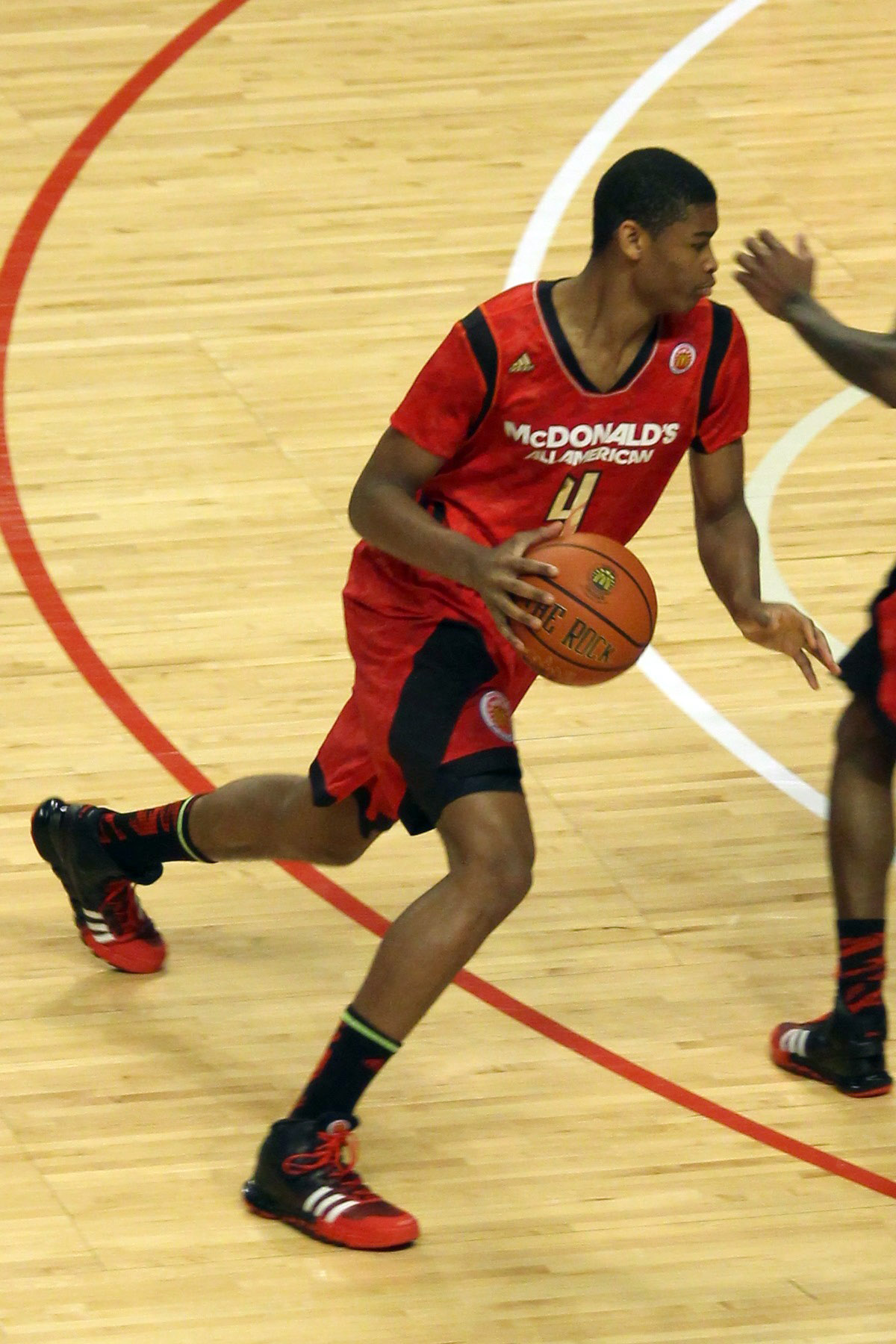
Isaiah Hicks

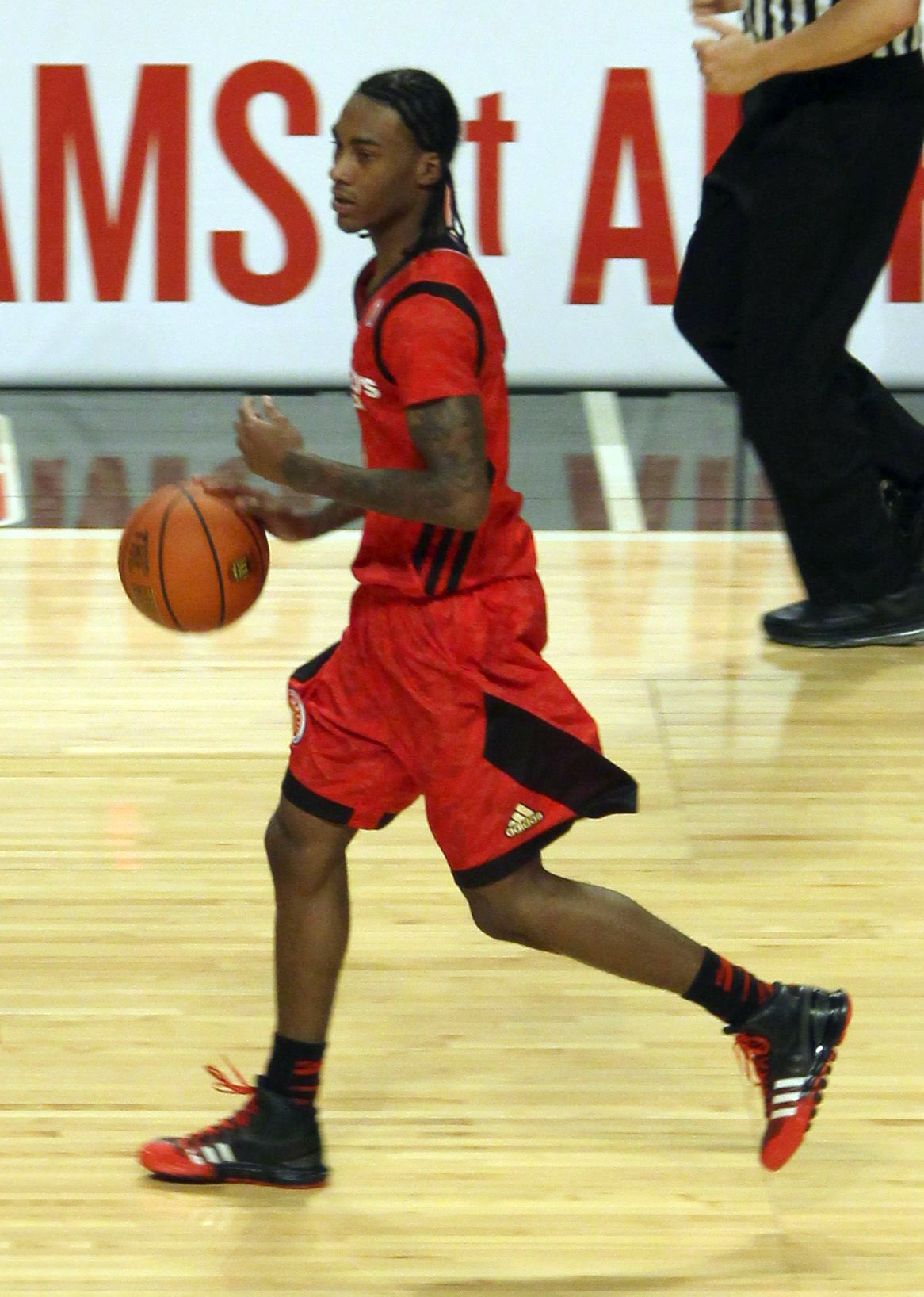
Cat Barber

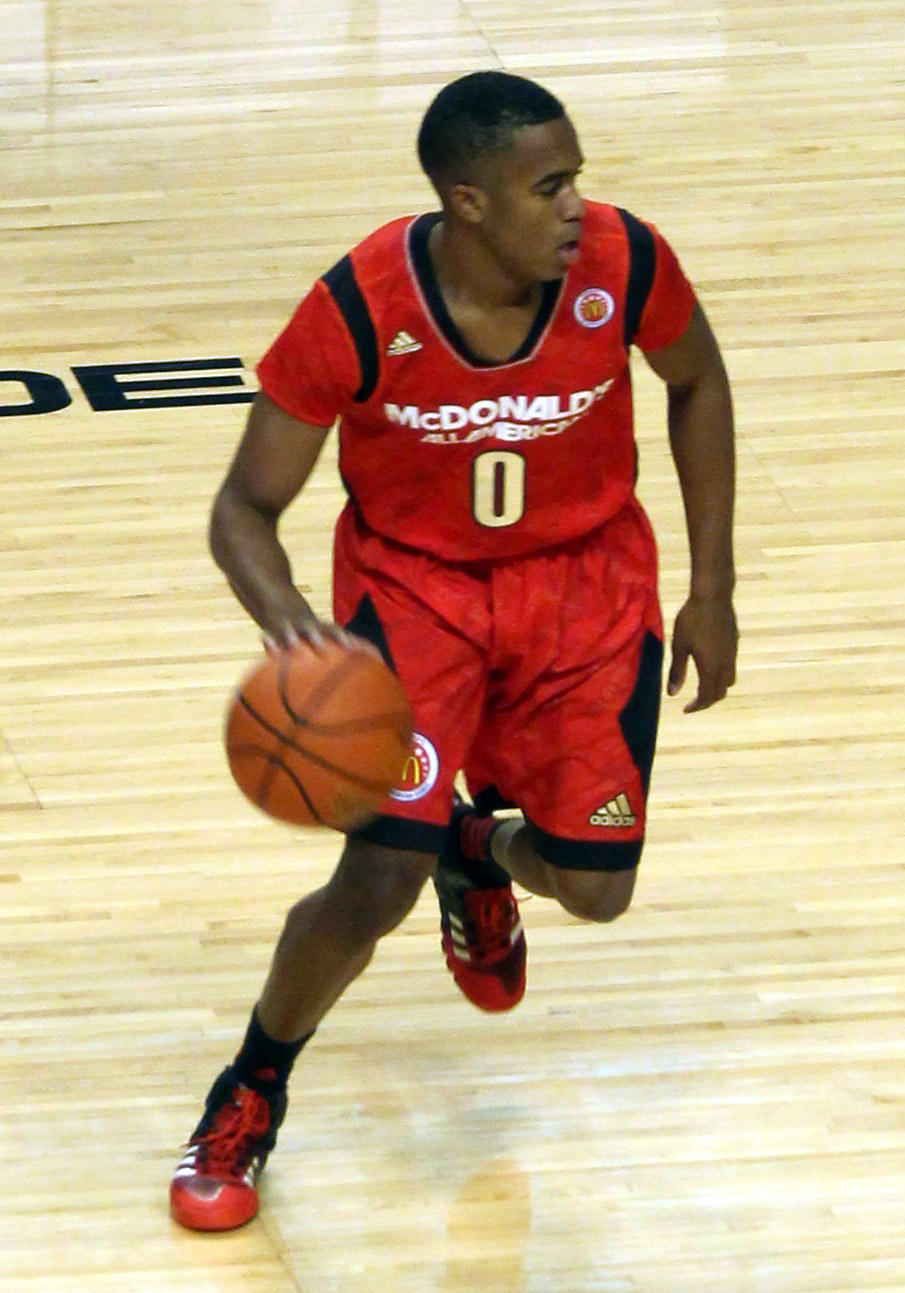
Kasey Hill

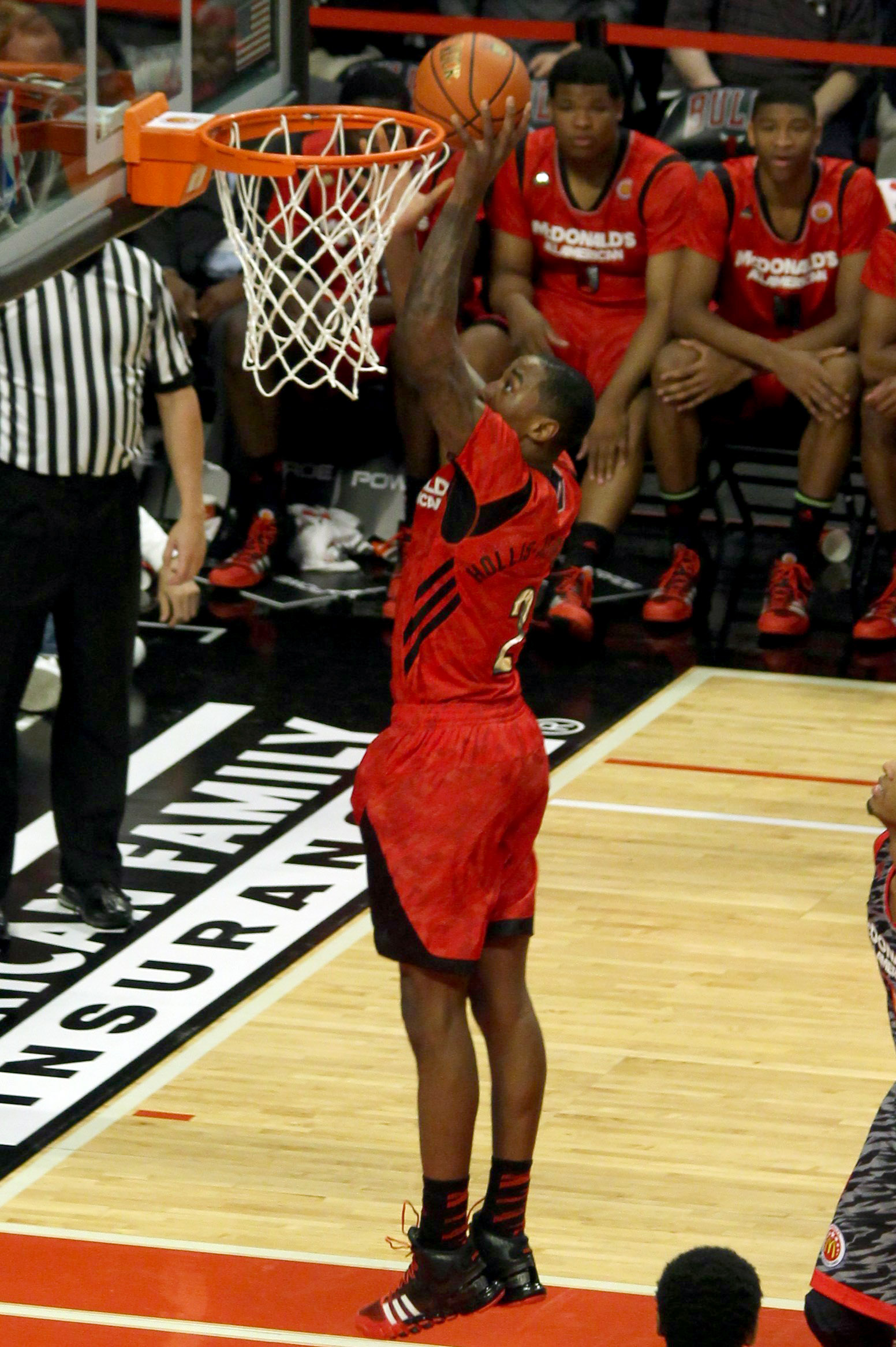
Rondae Hollis-Jefferson

=== West Roster ===
#	Name	Height	Weight	Position	Hometown	High school	College choice
23	Jabari Bird	6-6	185	G	Richmond, California	Salesian High School	California
32	Aaron Gordon	6-8	220	F	San Jose, California	Archbishop Mitty High School	Arizona
4	Isaac Hamilton	6-5	185	G	Bellflower, California	St. John Bosco High School	Texas-El Paso
2	Aaron Harrison	6-6	215	G	Richmond, Texas	William B. Travis High School	Kentucky
5	Andrew Harrison	6-5	215	G	Richmond, Texas	William B. Travis High School	Kentucky
14	Matt Jones	6-5	198	G	DeSoto, Texas	DeSoto High School	Duke
24	Marcus Lee	6-10	202	F	Antioch, California	Deer Valley High School	Kentucky
35	Jarell Martin	6-9	222	F	Tallulah, Louisiana	Madison Preparatory Academy	LSU
22	Jabari Parker	6-8	240	F	Chicago, Illinois	Simeon Career Academy	Duke
10	Bobby Portis	6-10	220	F	Little Rock, Arkansas	Hall High School	Arkansas
0	Nigel Williams-Goss	6-3	180	G	Happy Valley, Oregon	Findlay Prep	Washington
1	James Young	6-6	210	G	Rochester, Michigan	Rochester High School	Kentucky

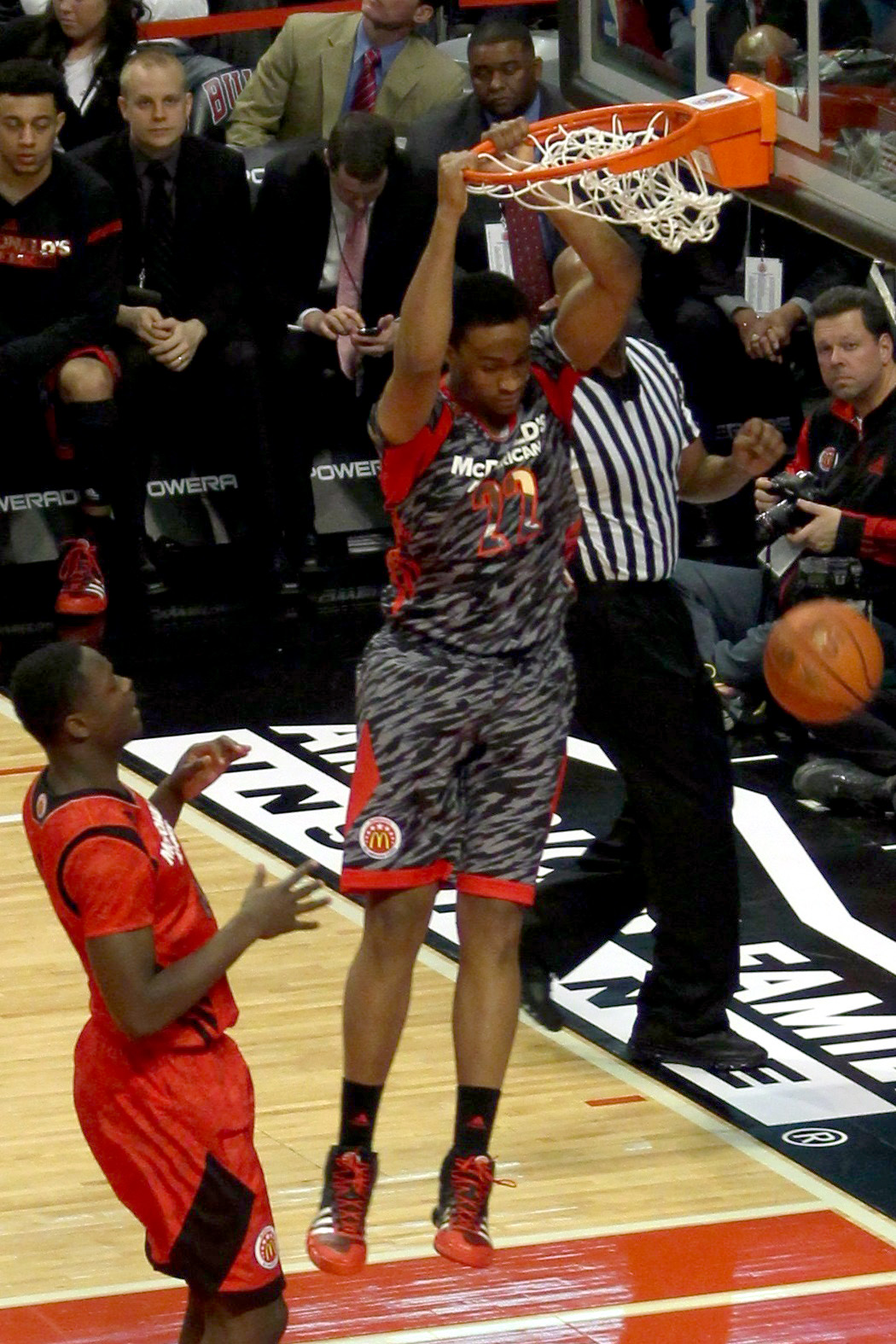
Jabari Parker

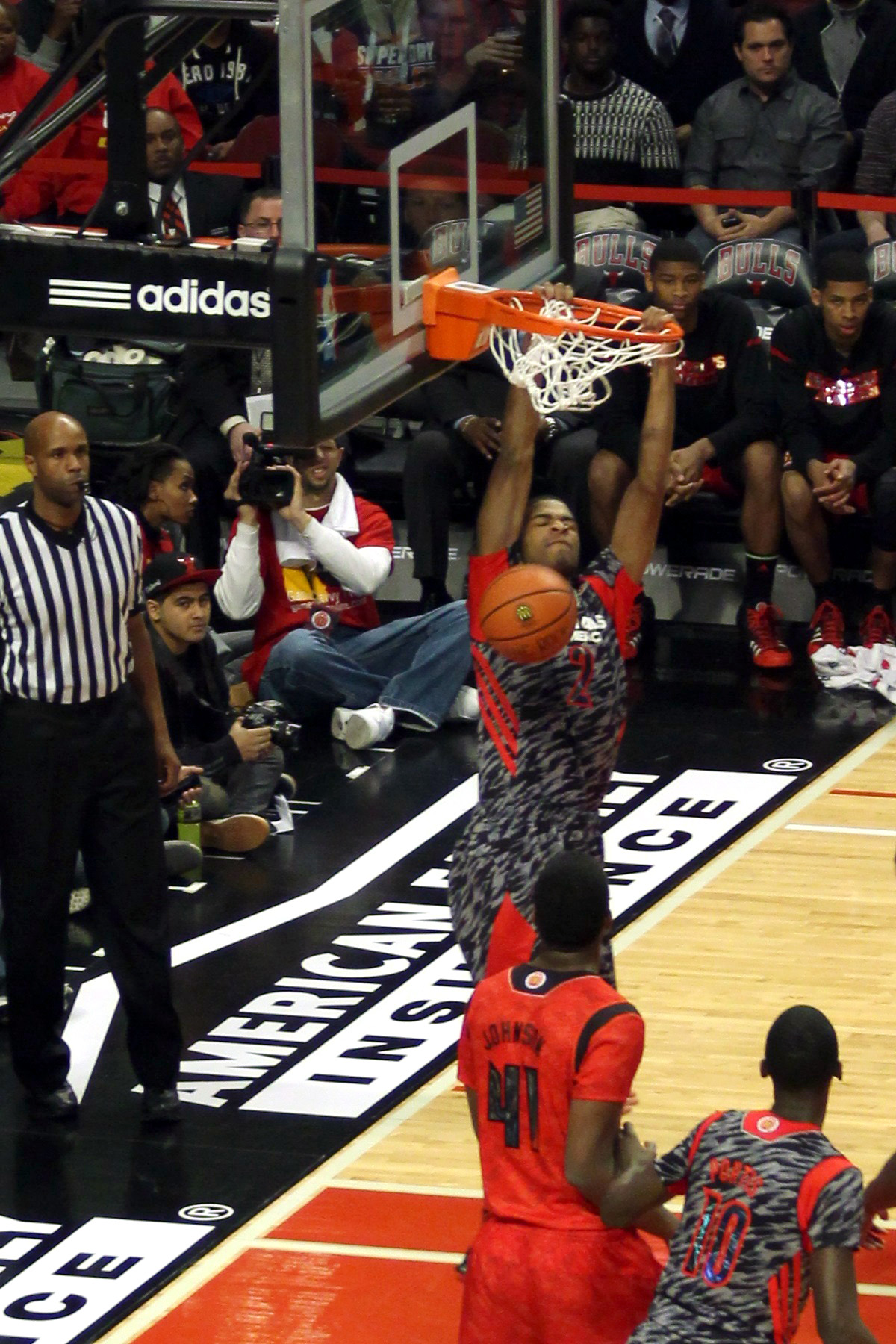
Aaron Harrison

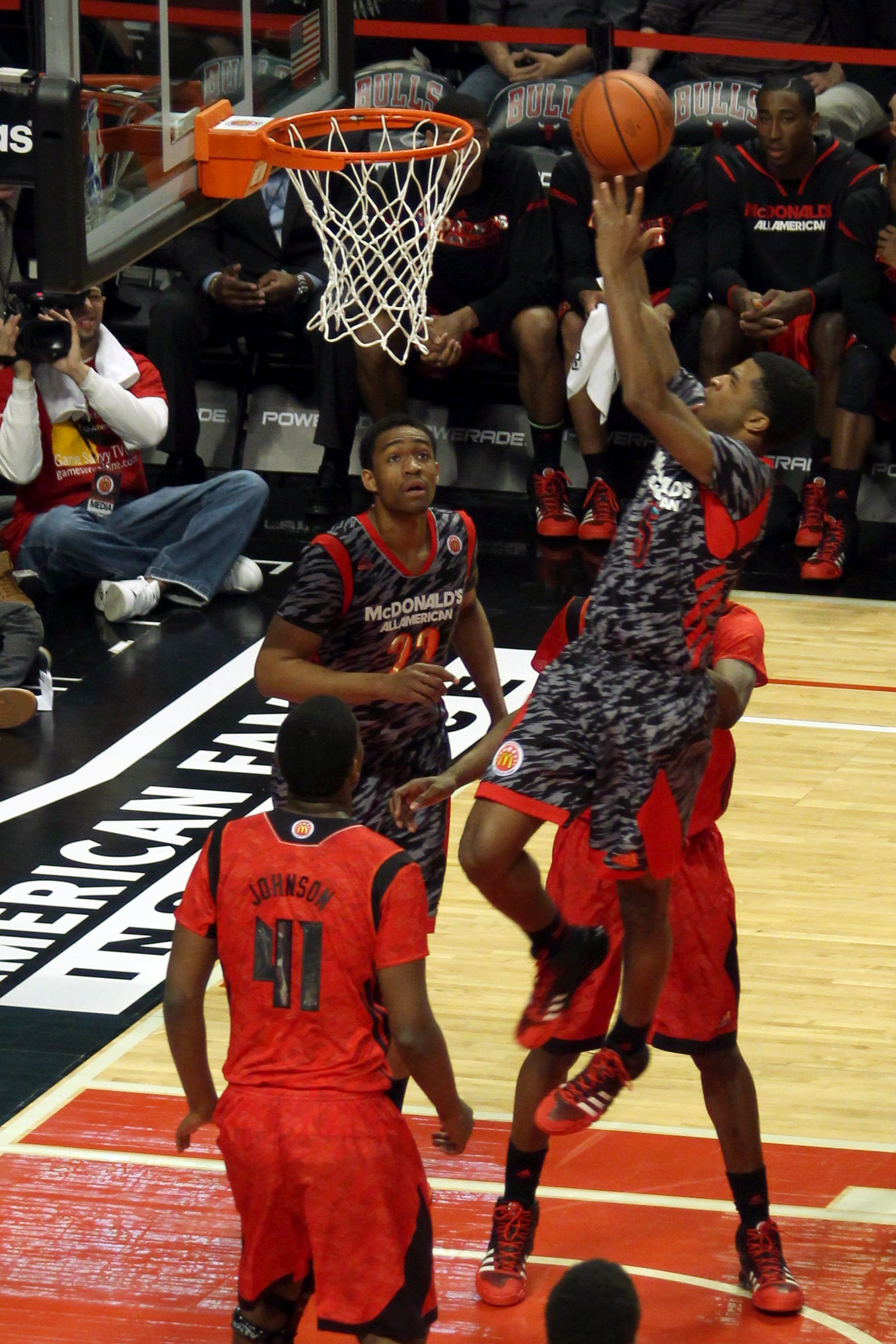
Andrew Harrison

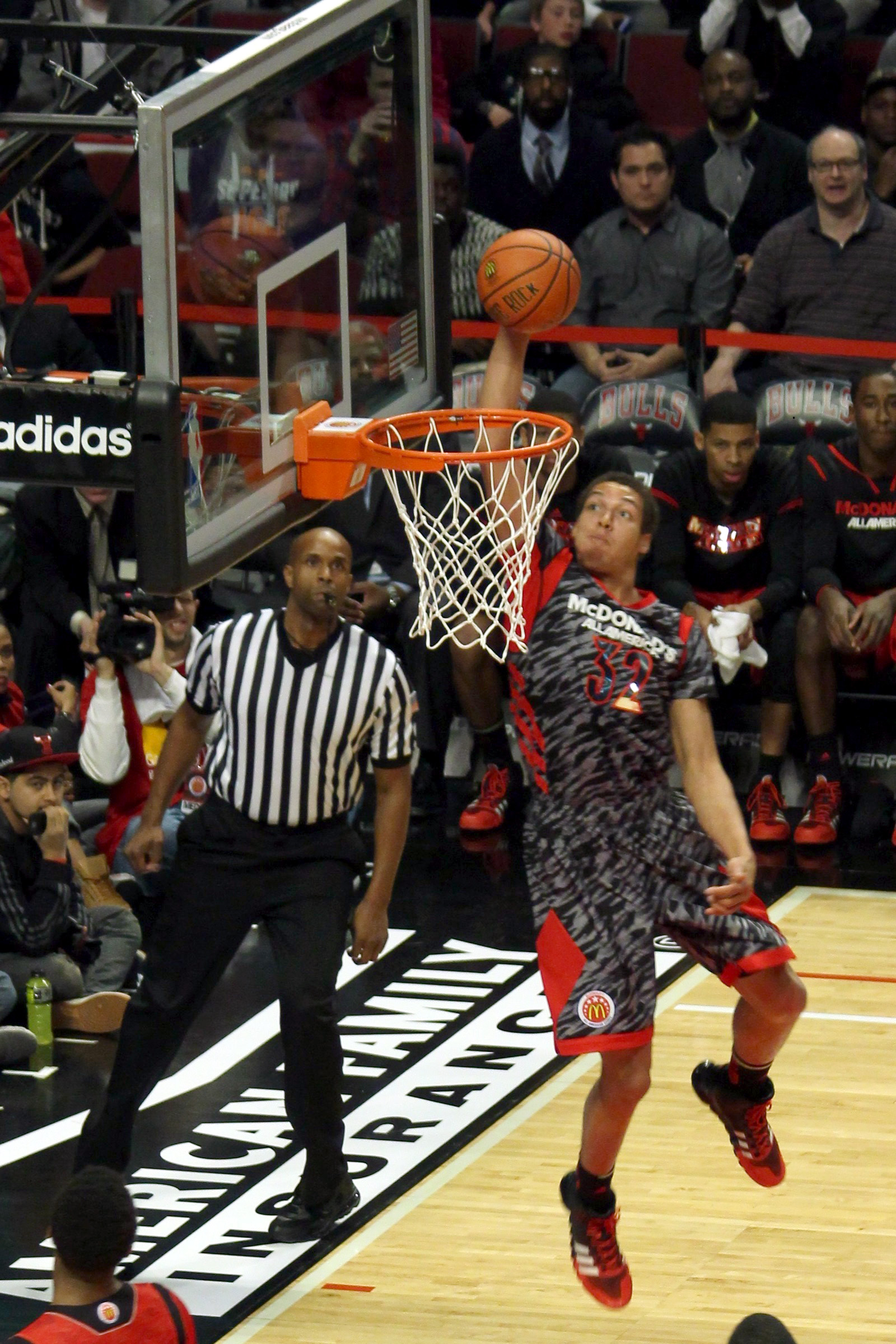
Aaron Gordon

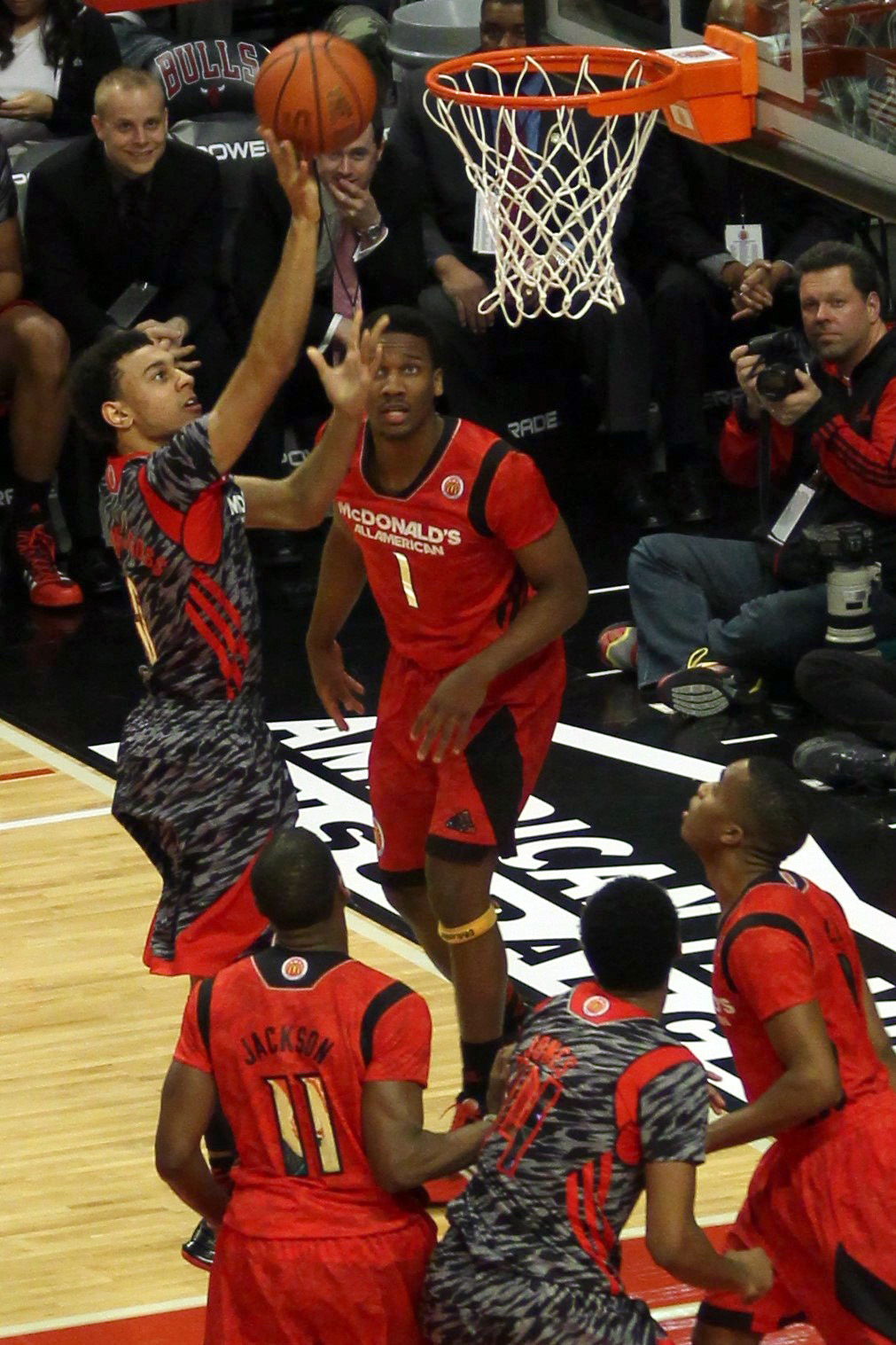
Nigel Williams-Goss

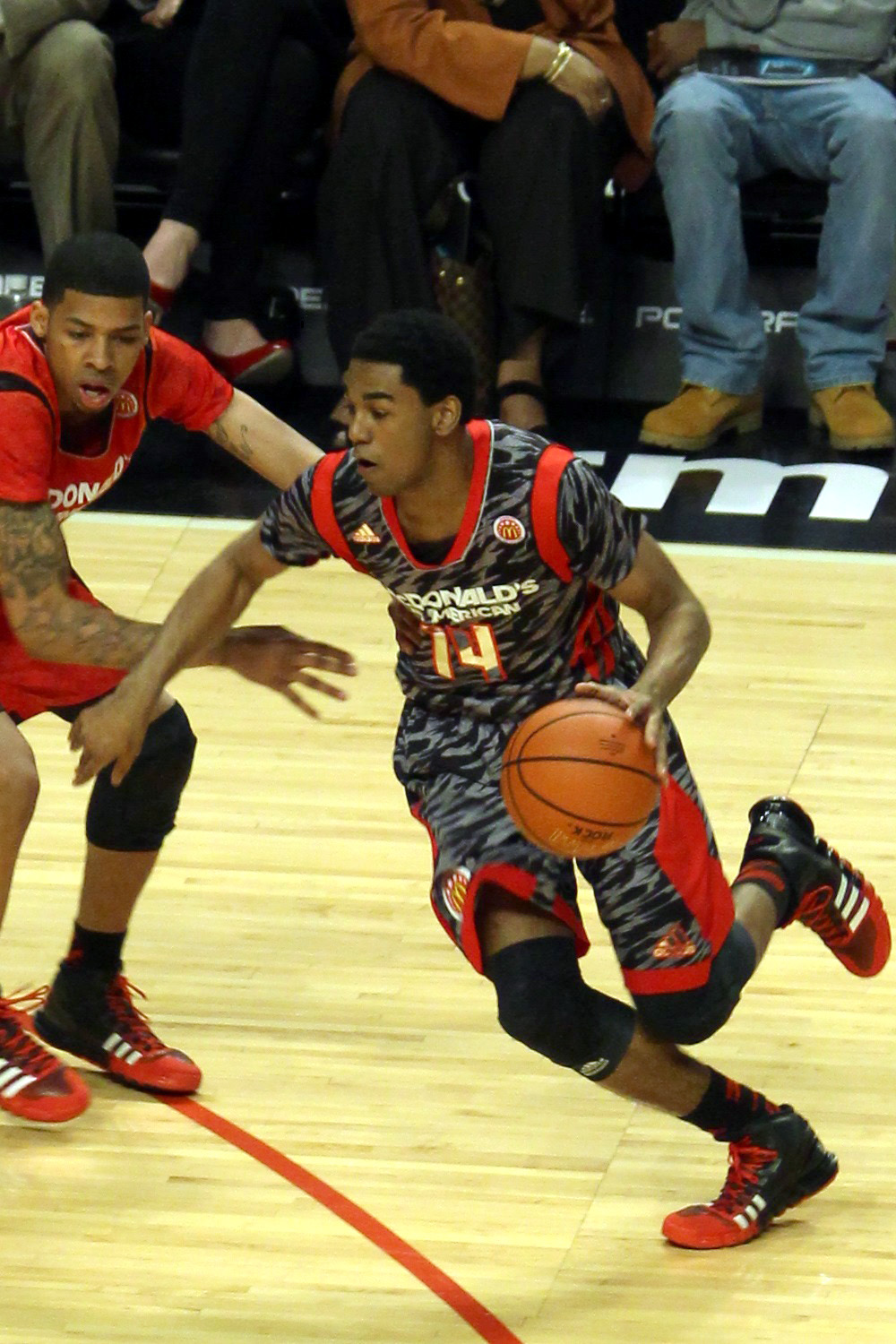
Matt Jones

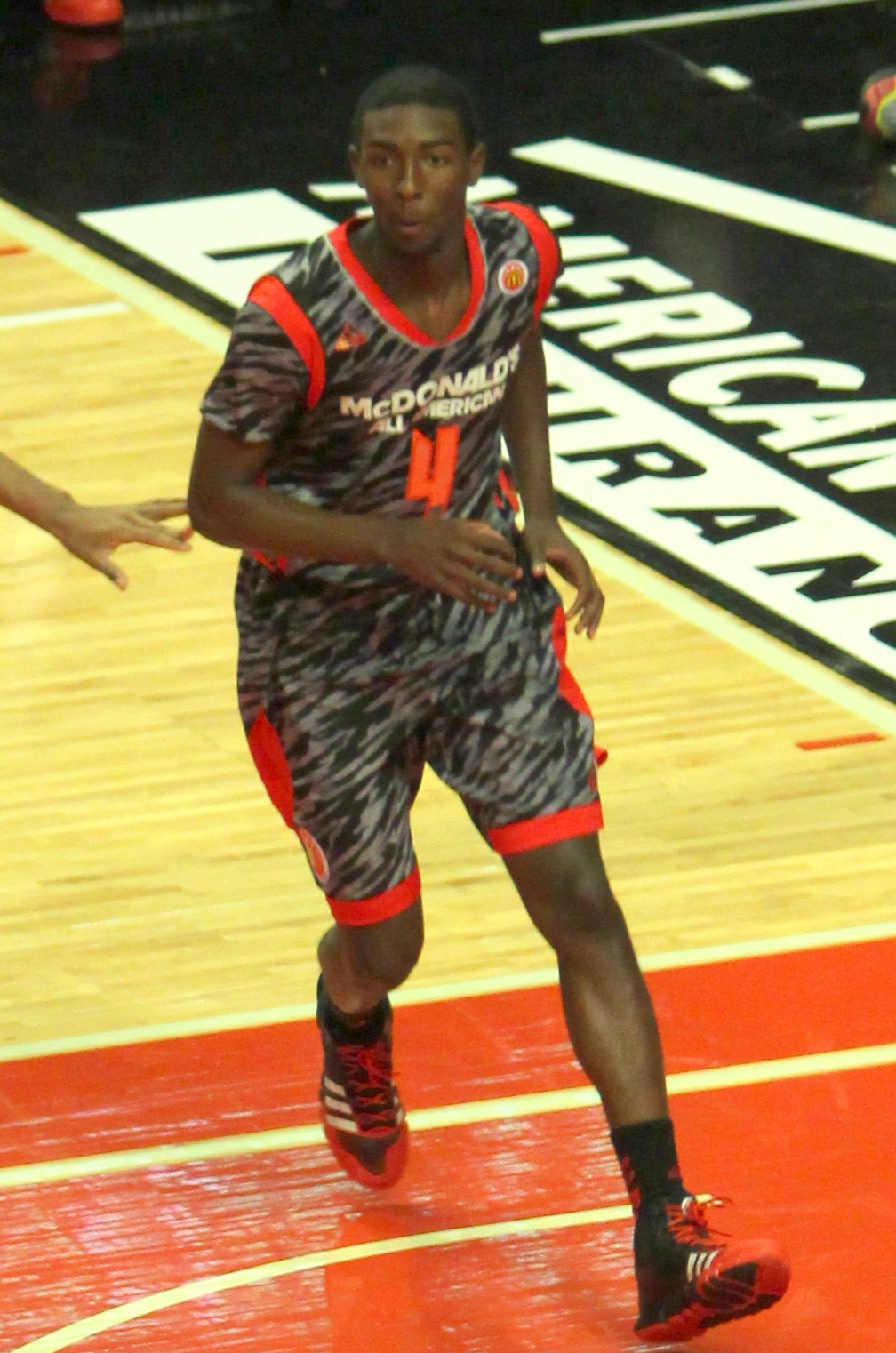
Isaac Hamilton

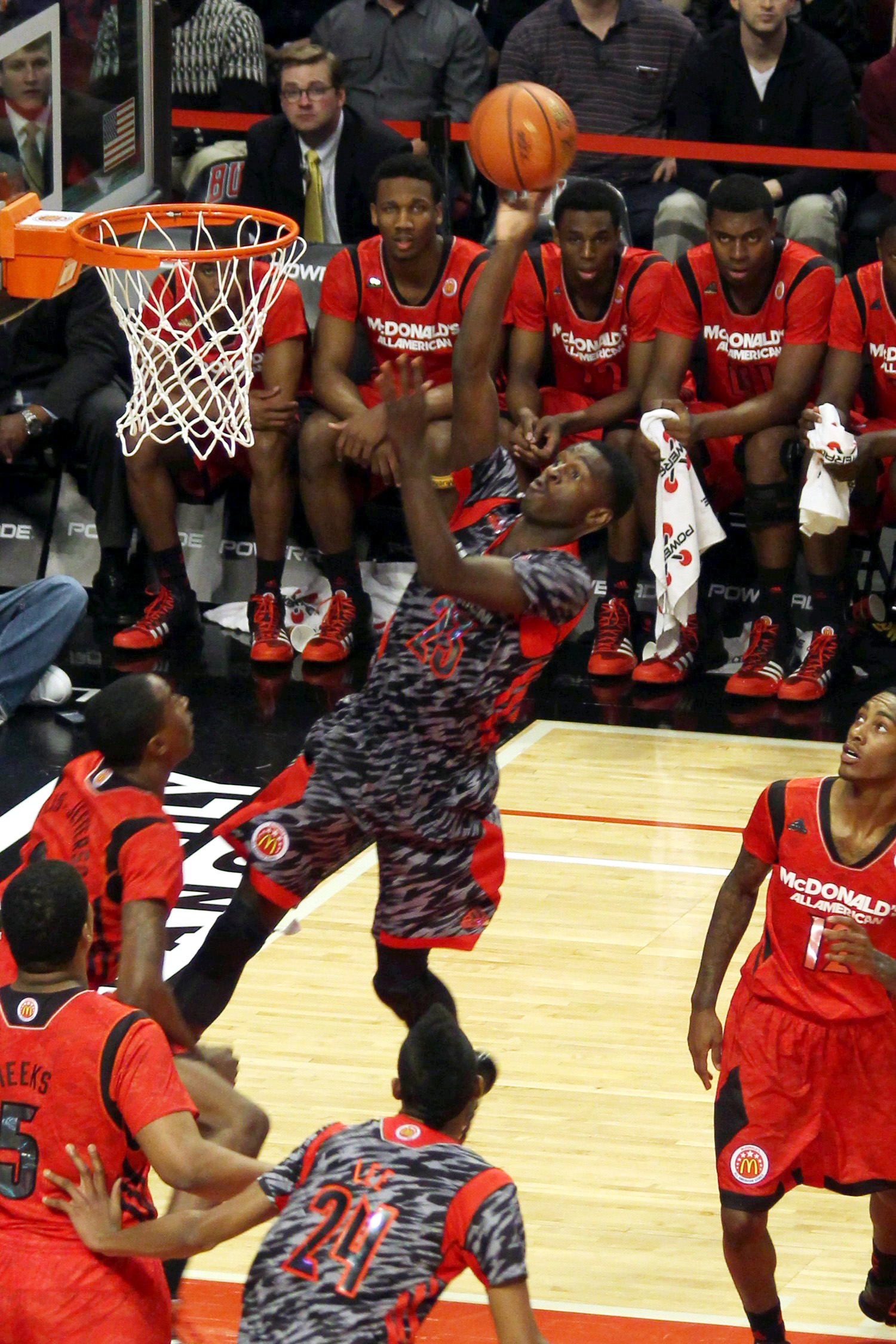
Jabari Bird

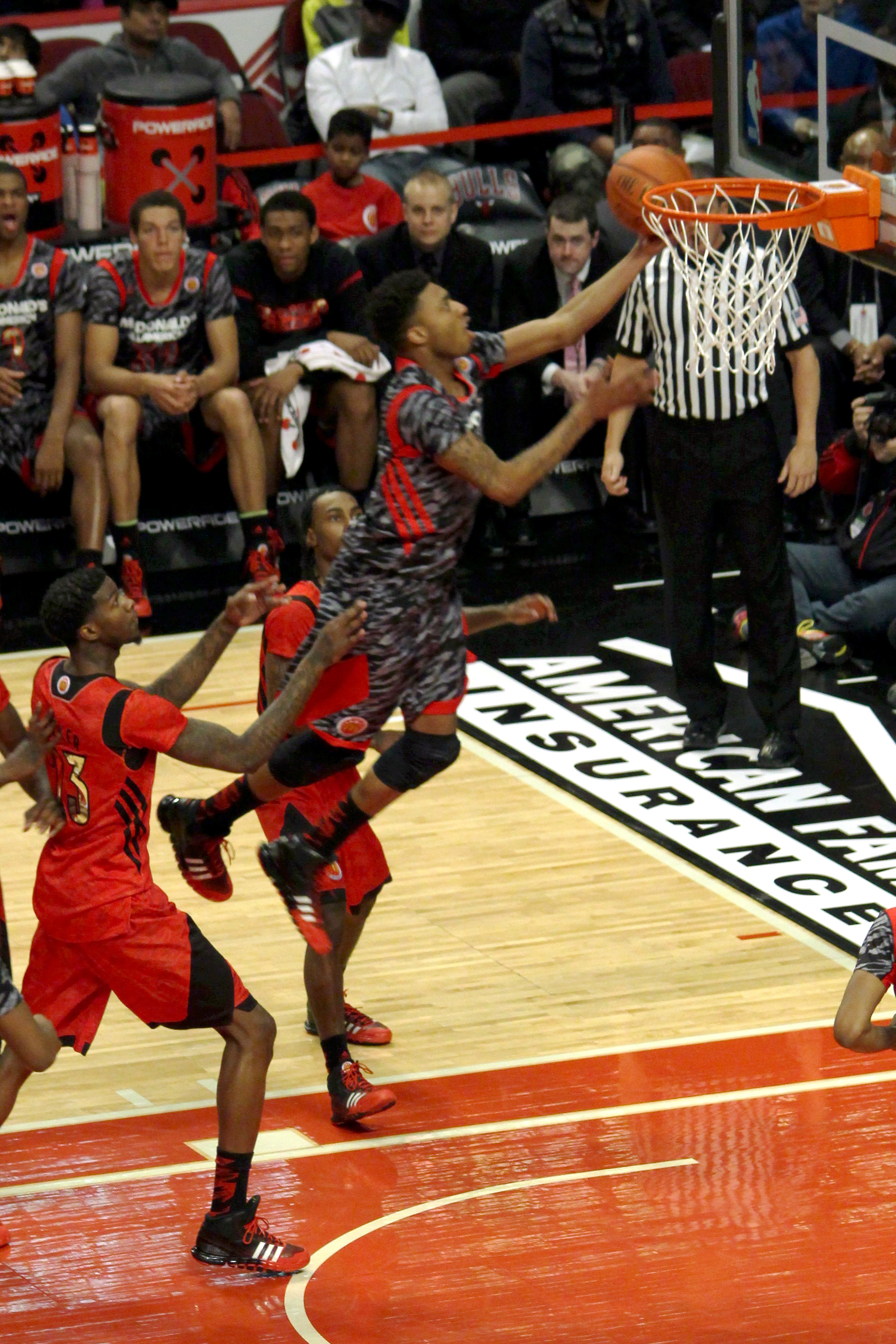
James Young

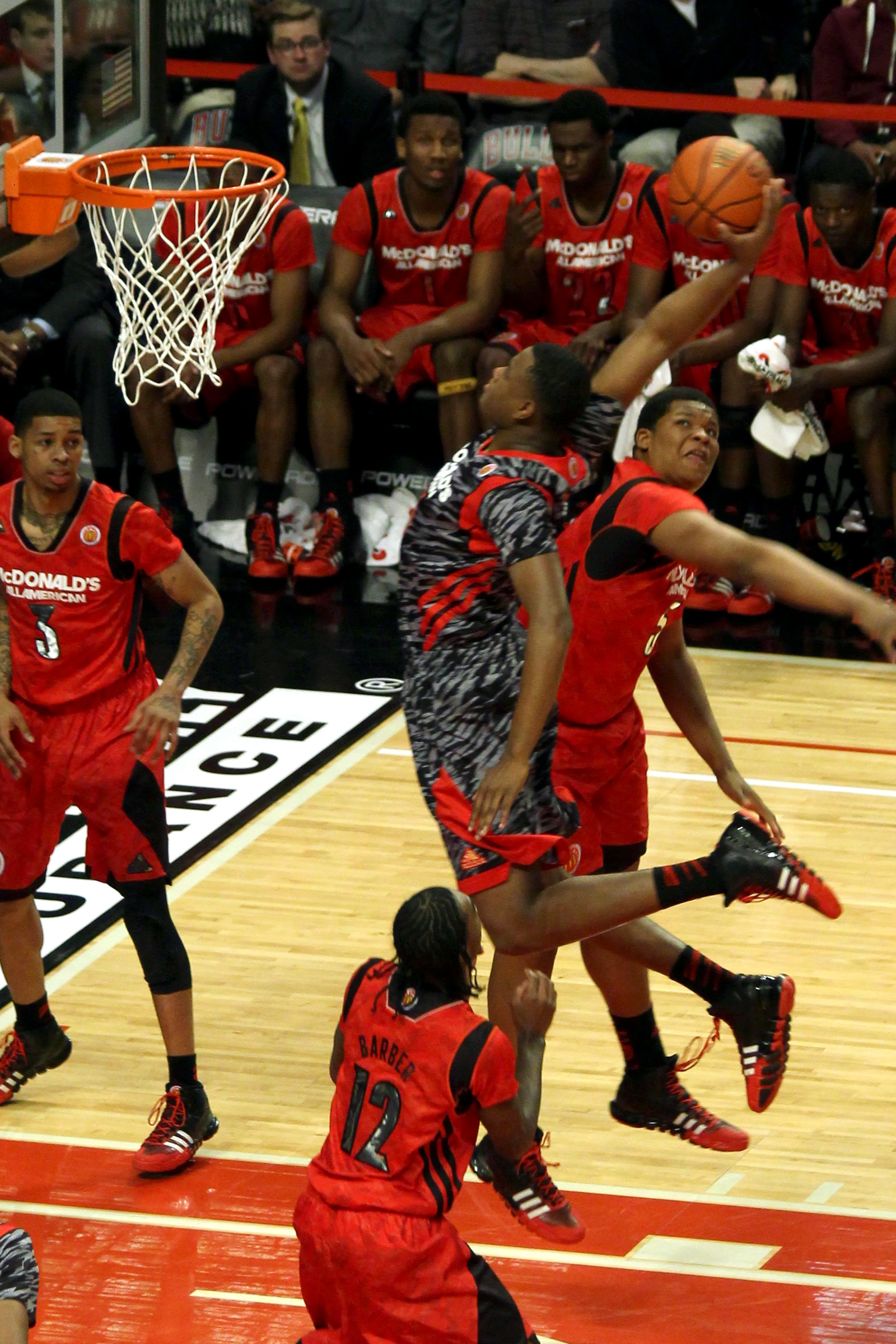
Jarell Martin

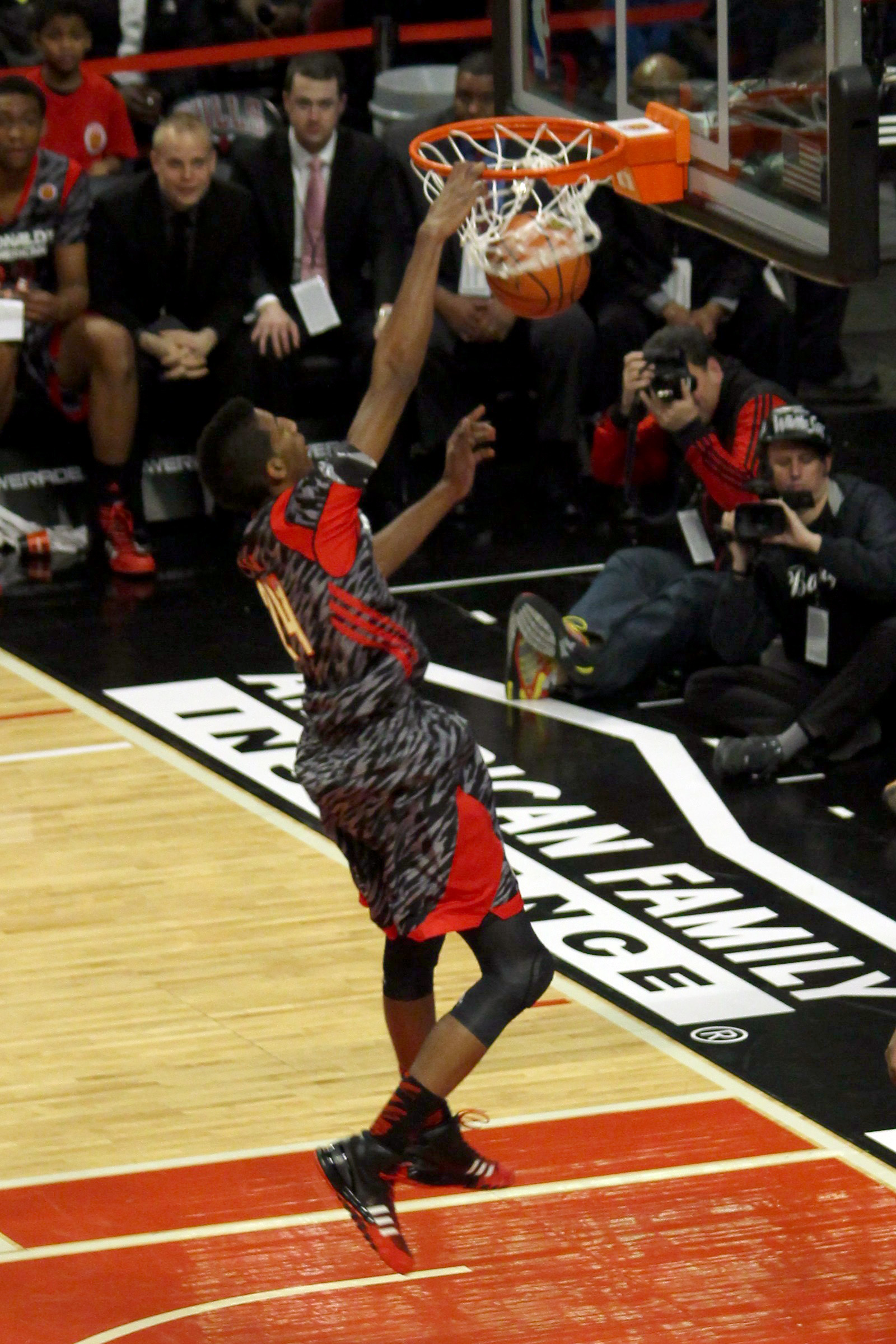
Marcus Lee

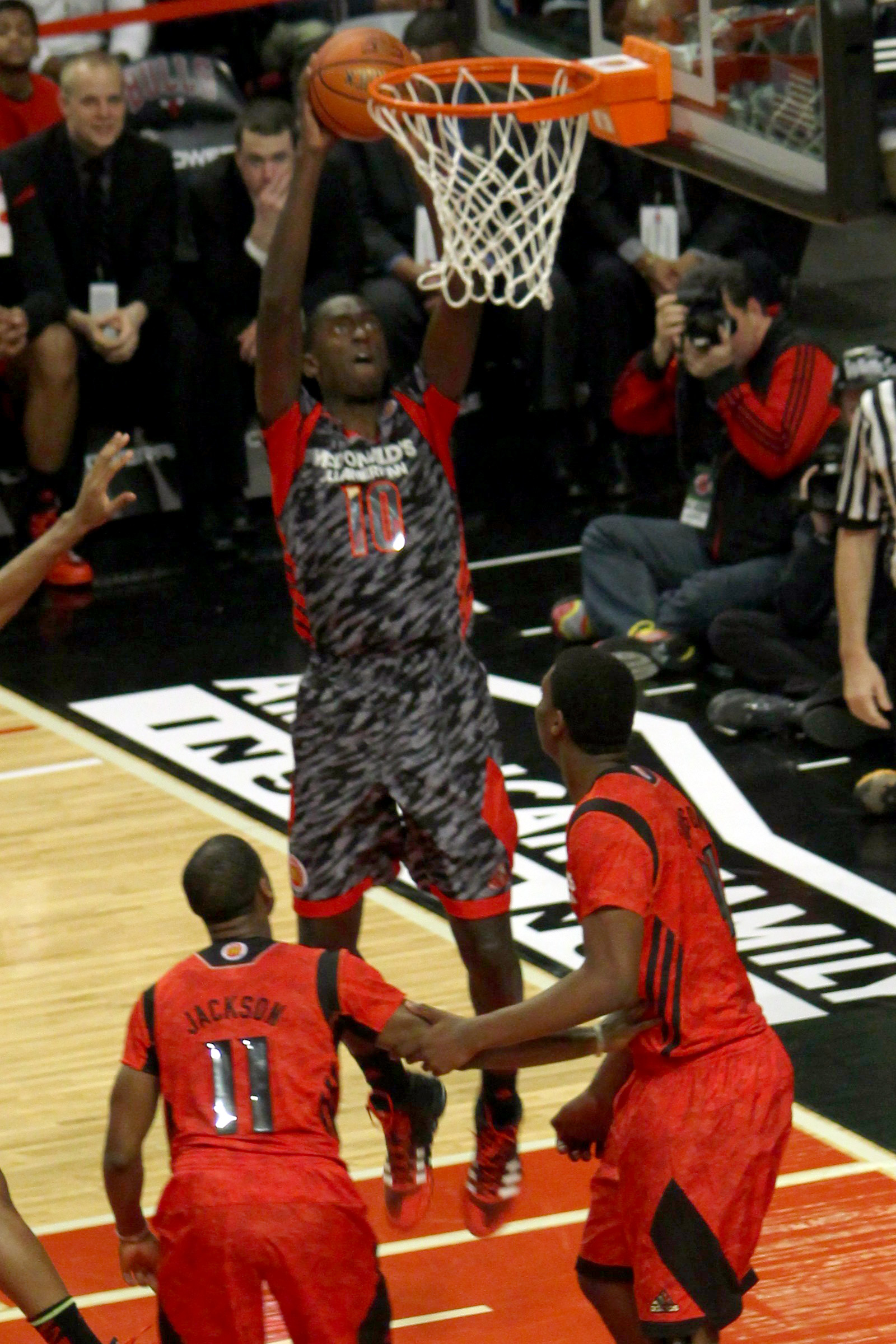
Bobby Portis

=== Awards ===
On March 18, Parker earned the Morgan Wootten Male Player of the Year (also known as the McDonald's player of the year). The award recognizes "the McDonald's All-American who demonstrates outstanding character, exhibits leadership and exemplifies the values of being a student-athlete in the classroom and the community". He won the award over five other finalists: Aaron Gordon, Aaron Harrison, Andrew Harrison, Dakari Johnson and Andrew Wiggins.

On April 1, Demetrius Jackson won the boys skills contest, Nigel Williams-Goss won the three-point shooting contest and Chris Walker won the slam dunk competition at the Ratner Center. Aaron Gordon posted 24 points and 8 rebounds to earn the MVP of the game.

=== Coaches ===
The West team was coached by:

- Head coach Mike Flaherty of Mt. Carmel High School (Chicago, IL)
- Asst coach Jasper Williams of Bloom Township High School (Chicago Heights, IL)
- Asst coach Brian Flaherty of Bremen High School (Midlothian, IL)

The East team was coached by:

- Head coach Freddy Johnson of Greensboro Day School (Greensboro, NC)
- Asst coach Steve Shelton of Greensboro Day School (Greensboro, NC)
- Asst coach Jeff Smith of Greensboro Day School (Greensboro, NC)

== Game ==
ESPN

April 3, 2013
08:30

Boxscore

East	99–110	West
Scoring by half: 44–56, 55–54
Pts: Andrew Wiggins 19; Rebs: Julius Randle 7 Asts: Demetrius Jackson, Cat Barber 4		Pts: Aaron Gordon 24; Rebs: Gordon, Jabari Parker 8 Asts: Nigel Williams-Goss 6

United Center, Chicago, IL
